= March 2011 in sports =

<<	March 2011					>>
Su	Mo	Tu	We	Th	Fr	Sa
		1	2	3	4	5
6	7	8	9	10	11	12
13	14	15	16	17	18	19
20	21	22	23	24	25	26
27	28	29	30	31
Sports

This list shows notable sports-related deaths, events, and notable outcomes that occurred in March of 2011.

== Deaths in March ==
- 4: Frank Chirkinian
- 21: Nikolai Andrianov
- 31: Claudia Heill

== Sporting seasons ==
=== Australian rules football 2011 ===
- Australian Football League

=== Auto racing 2011 ===
- Formula One
- Sprint Cup
- Nationwide Series
- Camping World Truck Series
- IRL IndyCar Series
- World Rally Championship
- WTTC
- V8 Supercar
- GP2 Asia Series
- Rolex Sports Car Series

=== Baseball 2011 ===
- Major League Baseball

=== Basketball 2011 ===
- NBA
- NCAA Division I men
- NCAA Division I women
- Euroleague
- EuroLeague Women
- Eurocup
- EuroChallenge
- France
- Germany
- Greece
- Israel
- Italy
- Philippines
  - Commissioner's Cup
- Russia
- Spain
- Turkey

=== Darts 2011 ===
- Premier League

=== Football (soccer) 2011 ===
National teams competitions

- UEFA Euro 2012 qualifying
- 2012 Africa Cup of Nations qualification

International clubs competitions

- UEFA (Europe) Champions League
- UEFA Europa League
- UEFA Women's Champions League
- Copa Libertadores (South America)
- AFC (Asia) Champions League
- AFC Cup
- CAF (Africa) Champions League
- CAF Confederation Cup
- CONCACAF (North & Central America) Champions League
- OFC (Oceania) Champions League

Domestic (national) competitions

- Argentina
- England
- France
- Germany
- Iran
- Italy
- Japan
- Norway
- Portugal
- Russia
- Scotland
- Spain
- Major League Soccer (USA & Canada)

=== Golf 2011 ===
- PGA Tour
- European Tour
- LPGA Tour
- Champions Tour

=== Ice hockey 2011 ===
- National Hockey League
- Kontinental Hockey League
- Czech Extraliga
- Elitserien
- Canadian Hockey League:
  - OHL, QMJHL, WHL
- NCAA Division I men
- NCAA Division I women

=== Motorcycle racing 2011 ===
- Superbike World Championship
- Supersport World Championship

=== Rugby league 2011 ===
- Super League
- NRL

=== Rugby union 2011 ===
- Heineken Cup
- European Challenge Cup
- English Premiership
- Celtic League
- LV Cup
- Top 14
- Super Rugby
- Sevens World Series

=== Snooker 2011 ===
- Players Tour Championship

=== Tennis 2011 ===
- ATP World Tour
- WTA Tour

=== Volleyball 2011 ===
International clubs competitions

- Men's CEV Champions League
- Women's CEV Champions League

Domestic (national) competitions

- Iranian Men's Super League
- Philippine collegiate (UAAP)

=== Winter sports ===
- Alpine Skiing World Cup
- Biathlon World Cup
- Cross-Country Skiing World Cup
- Freestyle Skiing World Cup
- Nordic Combined World Cup
- Ski Jumping World Cup
- Snowboard World Cup
- Speed Skating World Cup

== Days of the month ==
=== March 31, 2011 (Thursday) ===
==== Baseball ====
- MLB season opening games:
  - American League:
    - New York Yankees 6, Detroit Tigers 3
    - Los Angeles Angels of Anaheim 4, Kansas City Royals 2
  - National League:
    - Atlanta Braves 2, Washington Nationals 0
    - Cincinnati Reds 7, Milwaukee Brewers 6
    - San Diego Padres 5, St. Louis Cardinals 3 (11 innings)
    - Los Angeles Dodgers 2, San Francisco Giants 1

==== Basketball ====
- Euroleague Quarterfinals, game 4: (best-of-5 series)
  - Maccabi Tel Aviv (Israel) 99–77 (Spain) Caja Laboral. **Maccabi Tel Aviv win series 3–1.**
  - Panathinaikos BC (Greece) 78–67 (Spain) Regal FC Barcelona. **Panathinaikos win series 3–1.**
  - Power Electronics Valencia (Spain) 81–72 (Spain) Real Madrid. Series tied 2–2.
  - Montepaschi Siena (Italy) 88–76 (Greece) Olympiacos Piraeus. **Montepaschi Siena win series 3–1.**
- National Invitation Tournament Final in New York City:
  - Wichita State 66, Alabama 57

==== Darts ====
- Premier League, week 8 in Cardiff, Wales:
  - James Wade (ENG) 6–8 Gary Anderson (SCO)
  - Simon Whitlock (AUS) 8–3 Terry Jenkins (ENG)
  - Phil Taylor (ENG) 8–3 Raymond van Barneveld (NED)
  - Adrian Lewis (ENG) 8–1 Mark Webster (WAL)
    - Standings (after 8 matches): Taylor 14 points, Anderson, van Barneveld 10, Lewis 9, Whitlock 8, Jenkins 5, Webster, Wade 4.

==== Football (soccer) ====
- South American Under-17 Championship in Ecuador:
  - Final stage:
    - Argentina 1–1 Uruguay
    - Ecuador 2–2 Paraguay
    - Brazil 1–0 Colombia
      - Standings (after 2 matches): Argentina, Brazil 4 points, Ecuador, Uruguay 2, Paraguay, Colombia 1.
- CONCACAF U-20 Championship in Guatemala: (teams in **bold** advance to the quarterfinals)
  - Group A: **Honduras** 2–1 Jamaica
    - Standings: **Guatemala**, Honduras 3 points (1 match), Jamaica 0 (2).
  - Group B: **Panama** 3–0 Suriname
    - Standings: **United States**, Panama 3 points (1 match), Suriname 0 (2).
- Copa Libertadores second stage:
  - Group 8: Peñarol (Uruguay) 2–1 (Argentina) Godoy Cruz
    - Standings: Peñarol 9 points (5 matches), Godoy Cruz 7 (5), (Ecuador) LDU Quito 6 (4), (Argentina) Independiente 4 (4).

==== Golf ====
- Women's major:
  - Kraft Nabisco Championship in Rancho Mirage, California, United States
    - Leaderboard after first round: (T1) Brittany Lincicome (USA) & Stacy Lewis (USA) 66 (−6) (T3) Mika Miyazato (JPN) & Sandra Gal (DEU) 67 (−5)

==== Snooker ====
- China Open in Beijing, China, last 16:
  - **Stephen Lee** (ENG) 5–2 Ryan Day (WAL)
  - **Peter Ebdon** (ENG) 5–1 Neil Robertson (AUS)
  - Mark Davis (ENG) 2–5 **Judd Trump** (ENG)
  - Li Hang (CHN) 4–5 **Shaun Murphy** (ENG)
  - Stephen Hendry (SCO) 2–5 **Ding Junhui** (CHN)
  - **John Higgins** (SCO) 5–2 Ricky Walden (ENG)
  - Robert Milkins (ENG) 1–5 **Mark Selby** (ENG)
  - **Ali Carter** (ENG) 5–3 Marcus Campbell (SCO)

==== Wrestling ====
- European Championships in Dortmund, Germany:
  - Women:
    - 48 kg: (gold) Mariya Stadnik (AZE) (silver) Khrystyna Daranutsa (UKR) (bronze) Iwona Nina Matkowska (POL) & Cristina Raluca Croitoru (ROM)
    - 51 kg: (gold) Yuliya Blahinya (UKR) (silver) Estera Dobre (ROM) (bronze) Natalia Budu (MDA) & Ekatarina Krasnova (RUS)
    - 55 kg: (gold) Ida-Theres Karlsson-Nerell (SWE) (silver) Ludmila Cristea (MDA) (bronze) Maria Gurova (RUS) & Katarzyna Krawczyk (POL)

=== March 30, 2011 (Wednesday) ===
==== Basketball ====
- Women's National Invitation Tournament Semifinals:
  - In Toledo, Ohio: Toledo 83, Charlotte 60
  - In Normal, Illinois: USC 63, Illinois State 36
- College Basketball Invitational Final (best-of-3), Game 2 in Eugene, Oregon:
  - Oregon 71, Creighton 58. Series tied 1–1.
- CollegeInsider.com Tournament Final in New Rochelle, New York:
  - Santa Clara 76, Iona 69
    - The Broncos win their first national postseason tournament title.

==== Cricket ====
- World Cup:
  - Semi-final in Mohali, India: India 260/9 (50 overs; Wahab Riaz 5/46); Pakistan 231 (49.5 overs). **India win by 29 runs.**
    - India reach the final for the third time, and first since 2003. Pakistan lose in the semi-finals for the fourth time.

==== Football (soccer) ====
- CONCACAF U-20 Championship in Guatemala (teams in **bold** advance to the knockout stage):
  - Group C: Guadeloupe 0–3 **Costa Rica**
    - Standings: Costa Rica, **Canada** 3 points (1 match), Guadeloupe 0 (2).
  - Group D: Trinidad and Tobago 0–0 Cuba
    - Standings: **Mexico** 3 points (1 match), Trinidad and Tobago 1 (1), Cuba 1 (2).
- Copa Libertadores second stage (teams in **bold** advance to the knockout stage):
  - Group 6: Internacional (Brazil) 3–0 (Bolivia) Jorge Wilstermann
    - Standings (after 4 matches): Internacional 10 points, (Ecuador) Emelec 7, (Mexico) Chiapas 6, Jorge Wilstermann 0.
  - Group 7:
    - Deportes Tolima (Colombia) 1–1 (Argentina) **Estudiantes**
    - Guaraní (Paraguay) 0–2 (Brazil) **Cruzeiro**
      - Standings (after 5 matches): Cruzeiro 13 points, Estudiantes 10, Deportes Tolima 5, Guaraní 0.

==== Snooker ====
- China Open in Beijing, China, last 32:
  - **John Higgins** (SCO) 5–3 Nigel Bond (ENG)
  - Marco Fu (HKG) 3–5 **Judd Trump** (ENG)
  - **Ali Carter** (ENG) 5–1 Stuart Bingham (ENG)
  - **Peter Ebdon** (ENG) 5–2 Gerard Greene (NIR)
  - Ronnie O'Sullivan (ENG) 2–5 **Ryan Day** (WAL)
  - **Mark Selby** (ENG) 5–3 Tian Pengfei (CHN)
  - Jamie Cope (ENG) 3–5 **Robert Milkins** (ENG)
  - **Ricky Walden** (ENG) 5–4 Martin Gould (ENG)

==== Wrestling ====
- European Championships in Dortmund, Germany:
  - Men Freestyle:
    - 55 kg: (gold) Djamal Otarsultanov (RUS) (silver) Vladimer Khinchegashvili (GEO) (bronze) Vladislav Andreev (BLR) & Makhmud Magomedov (AZE)
    - 66 kg: (gold) Jabrail Hasanov (AZE) (silver) Leonid Bazan (BUL) (bronze) Adam Batirov (RUS) & Saba Arasch Javad Bolaghi (GER)
    - 84 kg: (gold) Anzor Urishev (RUS) (silver) Dato Marsagishvili (GEO) (bronze) Sharif Sharifov (AZE) & Gheorghiţă Ştefan (ROM)
    - 120 kg: (gold) Fatih Çakıroğlu (TUR) (silver) Alexei Shemarov (BLR) (bronze) Dániel Ligeti (HUN) & Jamaladdin Magomedov (AZE)

=== March 29, 2011 (Tuesday) ===
==== Basketball ====
- Euroleague Quarterfinals, game 3: (best-of-5 series)
  - Maccabi Tel Aviv (Israel) 81–60 (Spain) Caja Laboral. Maccabi Tel Aviv lead series 2–1.
  - Panathinaikos BC (Greece) 76–74 (Spain) Regal FC Barcelona. Panathinaikos lead series 2–1.
  - Power Electronics Valencia (Spain) 66–75 (Spain) Real Madrid. Real Madrid lead series 2–1.
  - Montepaschi Siena (Italy) 81–72 (Greece) Olympiacos Piraeus. Montepaschi Siena lead series 2–1.
- Women's Division I Tournament (seeds in parentheses):
  - Philadelphia Regional, Regional Final: (1) Connecticut 75, (2) Duke 40
    - The Huskies advance to their fourth successive Final Four, and their twelfth overall.
  - Dallas Regional, Regional Final: (2) Texas A&M 58, (1) Baylor 46
    - The Aggies advance to their first Final Four.
- National Invitation Tournament Semifinals in New York City:
  - Wichita State 75, Washington State 44
  - Alabama 62, Colorado 61

==== Cricket ====
- World Cup:
  - Semi-final in Colombo, Sri Lanka: New Zealand 217 (48.5 overs); Sri Lanka 220/5 (47.5 overs). **Sri Lanka win by 5 wickets.**
    - Sri Lanka reach their second consecutive World Cup final, and third overall. New Zealand lose in the semi-finals for the sixth time.

==== Football (soccer) ====
- UEFA Euro 2012 qualifying, matchday 6:
  - Group A:
    - Turkey 2–0 Austria
    - Belgium 4–1 Azerbaijan
      - Standings: Germany 15 points (5 matches), Belgium 10 (6), Turkey 9 (5), Austria 7 (5), Azerbaijan 3 (4), Kazakhstan 0 (5).
  - Group C:
    - Estonia 1–1 Serbia
    - Northern Ireland 0–0 Slovenia
      - Standings: Italy 13 points (5 matches), Slovenia, Serbia 8 (6), Estonia 7 (5), Northern Ireland 6 (5), Faroe Islands 1 (5).
  - Group D: Romania 3–1 Luxembourg
    - Standings: France 12 points (5 matches), Belarus, Albania 8 (5), Bosnia and Herzegovina 7 (4), Romania 5 (5), Luxembourg 1 (6).
  - Group E:
    - Sweden 2–1 Moldova
    - Netherlands 5–3 Hungary
      - Standings: Netherlands 18 points (6 matches), Sweden 9 (4), Hungary 9 (6), Moldova 6 (5), Finland 3 (4), San Marino 0 (5).
  - Group F: Israel 1–0 Georgia
    - Standings: Greece 11 points (5 matches), Croatia 10 (5), Israel 10 (6), Georgia 9 (6), Latvia 4 (5), Malta 0 (5).
  - Group I:
    - Lithuania 1–3 Spain
    - Czech Republic 2–0 Liechtenstein
      - Standings: Spain 15 points (5 matches), Czech Republic 9 (5), Scotland, Lithuania 4 (4), Liechtenstein 0 (4).
- Friendly internationals: (top 10 in FIFA World Rankings)
  - (3) Germany 1–2 Australia
  - Costa Rica 0–0 (4) Argentina
  - (6) England 1–1 Ghana
  - Republic of Ireland 2–3 (7) Uruguay
  - France 0–0 (8) Croatia
  - (9) Portugal 2–0 Finland
  - (10) Greece 0–0 Poland
- CONCACAF U-20 Championship in Guatemala:
  - Group A: Guatemala 2–0 Jamaica
  - Group B: Suriname 0–4 United States

==== Snooker ====
- China Open in Beijing, China:
  - Wild-card round:
    - **Robert Milkins** (ENG) 5–1 Rouzi Maimaiti (CHN)
    - **Gerard Greene** (NIR) 5–2 Yu Delu (CHN)
  - Last 32:
    - Mark Williams (WAL) 4–5 **Stephen Lee** (ENG)
    - Stephen Maguire (SCO) 3–5 **Mark Davis** (ENG)
    - **Ding Junhui** (CHN) 5–4 Kurt Maflin (NOR)
    - **Shaun Murphy** (ENG) 5–3 Joe Perry (ENG)
    - Graeme Dott (SCO) 4–5 **Li Hang** (SCO)
    - Mark Allen (NIR) 4–5 **Marcus Campbell** (SCO)

==== Wrestling ====
- European Championships in Dortmund, Germany:
  - Men Freestyle:
    - 60 kg: (gold) Opan Sat (RUS) (silver) Sahit Prizreni (ALB) (bronze) Anatoli Guidea (BUL) & Vasyl Fedoryshyn (UKR)
    - 74 kg: (gold) Denis Tsargush (RUS) (silver) Musa Murtazaliev (ARM) (bronze) Gábor Hatos (HUN) & Davit Khutsishvili (GEO)
    - 96 kg: (gold) Khetag Gazyumov (AZE) (silver) Vladislav Baytsaev (RUS) (bronze) Pavlo Oliinyk (UKR) & Nicolai Ceban (MDA)

=== March 28, 2011 (Monday) ===
==== Basketball ====
- Women's Division I Tournament (seeds in parentheses):
  - Dayton Regional Final in Dayton, Ohio: (2) Notre Dame 73, (1) Tennessee 59
    - The Fighting Irish advance to the Final Four for the third time, and the first since winning their only national title in 2001.
  - Spokane Regional Final in Spokane, Washington: (1) Stanford 83, (11) Gonzaga 60
    - The Cardinal make their fourth consecutive Final Four, and 10th in all.
- College Basketball Invitational Final (best-of-3), Game 1 in Omaha, Nebraska:
  - Creighton 84, Oregon 76. Creighton leads series 1–0.

==== Football (soccer) ====
- Africa Cup of Nations qualification, matchday 3:
  - Group C in Bamako, Mali: Libya 3–0 Comoros
    - Standings (after 3 matches): Libya 7 points, Zambia 6, Mozambique 4, Comoros 0.
- South American Under-17 Championship in Ecuador:
  - Final stage:
    - Argentina 1–0 Paraguay
    - Ecuador 0–0 Colombia
    - Brazil 0–0 Uruguay
- CONCACAF U-20 Championship in Guatemala:
  - Group C: Canada 2–1 Guadeloupe
  - Group D: Cuba 0–3 Mexico

==== Snooker ====
- China Open in Beijing, China:
  - Wild-card round:
    - **Kurt Maflin** (NOR) 5–3 Cao Yupeng (CHN)
    - **Marcus Campbell** (SCO) 5–3 Mei Xiwen (CHN)
    - **Joe Perry** (ENG) 5–2 Li Yan (CHN)
    - **Nigel Bond** (ENG) 5–3 Jin Long (CHN)
    - Ken Doherty (IRL) 1–5 **Li Hang** (CHN)
  - Last 32:
    - **Stephen Hendry** (SCO) 5–1 Matthew Stevens (WAL)
    - **Neil Robertson** (AUS) 5–1 Barry Hawkins (ENG)

=== March 27, 2011 (Sunday) ===
==== Auto racing ====
- Formula One:
  - Australian Grand Prix in Melbourne: (1) Sebastian Vettel (GER) (Red Bull–Renault) (2) Lewis Hamilton (GBR) (McLaren–Mercedes) (3) Vitaly Petrov (RUS) (Renault)
- Sprint Cup Series:
  - Auto Club 400 in Fontana, California: (1) Kevin Harvick (Chevrolet; Richard Childress Racing) (2) Jimmie Johnson (Chevrolet; Hendrick Motorsports) (3) (Nevada) Kyle Busch (Toyota; Joe Gibbs Racing)
    - Drivers' championship standings (after 5 of 36 races): (1) (Missouri) Carl Edwards (Ford; Roush Fenway Racing) 187 points (2) (Indiana) Ryan Newman (Chevrolet; Stewart Haas Racing) 178 (3) (Nevada) Kurt Busch (Dodge; Penske Racing) 177
- IndyCar Series:
  - Honda Grand Prix of St. Petersburg in St. Petersburg, Florida: (1) Dario Franchitti (GBR) (Chip Ganassi Racing) (2) Will Power (AUS) (Team Penske) (3) Tony Kanaan (BRA) (KV Racing Technology)
    - Franchitti takes his 27th American open-wheel win, moving him into the top ten all-time, tied with Johnny Rutherford.
- World Rally Championship:
  - Rally de Portugal in Faro, Portugal: (1) Sébastien Ogier (FRA)/Julien Ingrassia (FRA) (Citroën DS3 WRC) (2) Sébastien Loeb (FRA)/Daniel Elena (MON) (Citroën DS3 WRC) (3) Jari-Matti Latvala (FIN)/Miikka Anttil (FIN) (Ford Fiesta RS WRC)
    - Drivers' championship standings (after 3 of 13 rallies): (1) Mikko Hirvonen (FIN) (Ford Fiesta RS WRC) & Loeb 58 points (3) Latvala 48

==== Basketball ====
- NCAA Division I Men's Tournament (seeds in parentheses):
  - Southwest Regional Final in San Antonio, Texas: (11) VCU 71, (1) Kansas 61
    - The Rams become the first CAA representative to reach the Final Four since George Mason in 2006.
  - East Regional Final in Newark, New Jersey: (4) Kentucky 76, (2) North Carolina 69
    - The Wildcats reach the Final Four for the 14th time, making their first appearance since winning the national championship in 1998.
- Women's Division I Tournament (seeds in parentheses):
  - Philadelphia Regional Semifinals in Philadelphia, Pennsylvania:
    - (1) Connecticut 68, (5) Georgetown 63
    - (2) Duke 70, (3) DePaul 63
  - Dallas Regional Semifinals in Dallas, Texas:
    - (2) Texas A&M 79, (6) Georgia 38
    - (1) Baylor 86, (5) Green Bay 76

==== Curling ====
- World Women's Championship in Esbjerg, Denmark:
  - Bronze Medal Game: Denmark 9–10 (bronze) **China**
  - Gold Medal Game: (gold) **Sweden** 7–5 Canada
    - Sweden win their eighth world title, and first since 2006.
    - Skip Anette Norberg wins her third world title.

==== Cycling ====
- UCI Track World Championships in Apeldoorn, Netherlands:
  - Men's 1km time trial: (gold) Stefan Nimke (GER) 1:00.793 (silver) Teun Mulder (NED) 1:01.179 (bronze) François Pervis (FRA) 1:01.228
    - Nimke wins his third time trial title and fourth world title overall.
  - Men's madison: (gold) Leigh Howard/Cameron Meyer (AUS) 8 points (silver) Martin Bláha/Jiří Hochmann (CZE) 1 (bronze) Theo Bos/Peter Schep (NED) 21 (−1 lap)
  - Women's omnium: (gold) Tara Whitten (CAN) 23 points (silver) Sarah Hammer (USA) 31 (bronze) Kirsten Wild (NED) 42
    - Whitten wins her second consecutive omnium title and third world title overall.
  - Women's keirin: (gold) Anna Meares (AUS) (silver) Olga Panarina (BLR) (bronze) Clara Sanchez (FRA)
    - Meares wins her third title of the championships and eighth title overall.
- UCI World Tour:
  - Volta a Catalunya, Stage 7: (gold) Samuel Dumoulin (FRA) (Cofidis) 2h 33' 55" (silver) Rigoberto Urán (COL) (Team Sky) s.t. (bronze) Kenny Dehaes (BEL) (Omega Pharma–Lotto) s.t.
    - Final general classification: (1) Alberto Contador (ESP) (Saxo Bank–SunGard) 29h 24' 42" (2) Michele Scarponi (ITA) (Lampre–ISD) + 23" (3) Dan Martin (IRL) (Garmin–Cervélo) + 35"
  - Gent–Wevelgem: (gold) Tom Boonen (BEL) (Quick-Step) 4h 36' 16" (silver) Daniele Bennati (ITA) (Leopard Trek) s.t. (bronze) Tyler Farrar (USA) (Garmin–Cervélo) s.t.
    - World Tour standings (after 6 of 27 races): (1) Matthew Goss (AUS) (HTC–Highroad) 203 points (2) Scarponi 202 (3) Cadel Evans (AUS) (BMC Racing Team) 128

==== Equestrianism ====
- FEI World Cup Show Jumping:
  - Western European League, 13th competition in 's-Hertogenbosch (CSI 5*-W): (gold) Denis Lynch (IRL) on Abbervail van het Dingeshof (silver) Jeroen Dubbeldam (NED) on Simon (bronze) Eric van der Vleuten (NED) on Utascha SFN
    - Final standings: (1) Kevin Staut (FRA) 96 points (2) Meredith Michaels-Beerbaum (GER) 90 (3) Rodrigo Pessoa (BRA) 85
      - Staut, Michaels-Beerbaum and Pessoa along with seventeen other riders qualify for the World Cup Final.
  - Central European League Final in Warsaw (CSI 2*-W): (gold) Mściwoj Kiecoń (POL) on Urbane (silver) Tiit Kivisild (EST) on Cinnamon (bronze) Vladimir Beletsky (RUS) on Rocketman
    - Kiecoń, Kivisild and Beletsky qualify for the World Cup Final.

==== Football (soccer) ====
- Africa Cup of Nations qualification, matchday 3:
  - Group B:
    - Madagascar 1–1 Guinea
    - Nigeria 4–0 Ethiopia
      - Standings (after 3 matches): Guinea 7 points, Nigeria 6, Ethiopia 3, Madagascar 1.
  - Group C: Mozambique 0–2 Zambia
    - Standings: Zambia 6 points (3 matches), Libya 4 (2), Mozambique 4 (3), Comoros 0 (2).
  - Group D: Algeria 1–0 Morocco
    - Standings (after 3 matches): Central African Republic, Tanzania, Morocco, Algeria 4 points.
  - Group E: DR Congo 3–0 Mauritius
    - Standings (after 3 matches): Senegal 9 points, Congo DR, Cameroon 4, Mauritius 0.
  - Group G: Niger 3–1 Sierra Leone
    - Standings (after 3 matches): South Africa 7 points, Niger 6, Sierra Leone 2, Egypt 1.
  - Group H: Ivory Coast 2–1 Benin
    - Standings (after 3 matches): Côte d'Ivoire 9 points, Benin 4, Rwanda 3, Burundi 1.
  - Group I:
    - Congo 0–3 Ghana
    - Sudan 3–0 Swaziland
      - Standings (after 3 matches): Ghana, Sudan 7 points, Congo 3, Swaziland 0.
- Friendly international: (top 10 in FIFA World Rankings)
  - Scotland 0–2 (5) Brazil in London

==== Golf ====
- PGA Tour:
  - Arnold Palmer Invitational in Orlando, Florida:
    - Winner: Martin Laird (SCO) 280 (−8)
      - Laird wins his second PGA Tour title, and becomes the first European winner of the tournament.
- European Tour:
  - Open de Andalucia in Málaga, Spain:
    - Winner: Paul Lawrie (SCO) 268 (−12)
      - Lawrie wins his sixth European Tour title, and first since 2002.
- LPGA Tour:
  - Kia Classic in Industry, California:
    - Winner: Sandra Gal (GER) 276 (−16)
      - Gal wins her first LPGA Tour title.

==== Motorcycle racing ====
- Superbike:
  - Donington Park World Championship round in Castle Donington, England:
    - Race 1: (1) Marco Melandri (ITA) (Yamaha YZF-R1) (2) Jakub Smrž (CZE) (Ducati 1198) (3) Carlos Checa (ESP) (Ducati 1198)
    - Race 2: (1) Checa (2) Melandri (3) Leon Camier (GBR) (Aprilia RSV4)
      - Riders' championship standings (after 2 of 13 rounds): (1) Checa 91 points (2) Melandri 72 (3) Leon Haslam (GBR) (BMW S1000RR) 53
- Supersport:
  - Donington Park World Championship round in Castle Donington, England: (1) Luca Scassa (ITA) (Yamaha YZF-R6) (2) Chaz Davies (GBR) (Yamaha YZF-R6) (3) Gino Rea (GBR) (Honda CBR600RR)
    - Riders' championship standings (after 2 of 12 rounds): (1) Scassa 50 points (2) Broc Parkes (AUS) (Kawasaki Ninja ZX-6R) 31 (3) Robbin Harms (DEN) (Honda CBR600RR) 24

==== Rugby union ====
- IRB Sevens World Series:
  - Hong Kong Sevens in Hong Kong:
    - Shield: **Kenya** 17–12 Spain
    - Bowl: Japan 12–33 **Canada**
    - Plate: **South Africa** 26–19 Australia
    - Cup: **New Zealand** 29–17 England
      - Standings (after 5 of 8 competitions): (1) New Zealand 110 points (2) England 105 (3) Fiji & Samoa 84.

==== Snowboarding ====
- World Cup in Arosa, Switzerland:
  - Men's parallel giant slalom: (gold) Andreas Prommegger (AUT) (silver) Roland Fischnaller (ITA) (bronze) Nevin Galmarini (SUI)
    - Final parallel slalom standings: (1) Benjamin Karl (AUT) 5790 points (2) Prommegger 5740 (3) Fischnaller 5420
      - Karl wins his second consecutive title, and third overall.
    - Final speed overall standings: (1) Karl 4950 points (2) Prommegger 4210 (3) Fischnaller 4110
  - Women's parallel giant slalom: (gold) Fränzi Mägert-Kohli (SUI) (silver) Yekaterina Tudegesheva (RUS) (bronze) Julia Dujmovits (AUT)
    - Final parallel slalom standings: (1) Tudegesheva 7690 points (2) Mägert-Kohli 5770 (3) Marion Kreiner (AUT) 4540
      - Tudegesheva becomes the first Russian to win a World Cup title.
    - Final speed overall standings: (1) Tudegesheva 6000 points (2) Dominique Maltais (CAN) 4800 (3) Mägert-Kohli 4050

==== Volleyball ====
- Men's CEV Champions League Final Four in Bolzano, Italy:
  - 3rd place: Jastrzębski Węgiel (Poland) 1–3 (Russia) (bronze) **Dynamo Moscow**
  - Final: (gold) **Trentino BetClic** (Italy) 3–1 (silver) (Russia) Zenit Kazan
    - Trentino win their third successive title.

=== March 26, 2011 (Saturday) ===
==== Auto racing ====
- Nationwide Series:
  - Royal Purple 300 in Fontana, California: (1) (Nevada) Kyle Busch (Toyota; Joe Gibbs Racing) (2) (Missouri) Carl Edwards (Ford; Roush Fenway Racing) (3) Kevin Harvick (Chevrolet; Kevin Harvick Incorporated)
    - Drivers' championship standings (after 5 of 34 races): (1) (Mississippi) Ricky Stenhouse Jr. (Ford; Roush Fenway Racing) 181 points (2) (California) Jason Leffler (Chevrolet; Turner Motorsports) 175 (3) (Illinois) Justin Allgaier (Chevrolet; Turner Motorsports) 156

==== Basketball ====
- NCAA Division I Men's Tournament (seeds in parentheses):
  - Southeast Regional Final in New Orleans, Louisiana: (8) Butler 74, (2) Florida 71 (OT)
    - The Bulldogs advance to the Final Four for the second successive season.
  - West Regional Final in Anaheim, California: (3) Connecticut 65, (5) Arizona 63
    - The Huskies advance to the Final Four for the second time in three seasons.
- Women's Division I Tournament (seeds in parentheses):
  - Dayton Regional Semifinals in Dayton, Ohio:
    - (1) Tennessee 85, (4) Ohio State 75
    - (2) Notre Dame 78, (6) Oklahoma 53
  - Spokane Regional Semifinals in Spokane, Washington:
    - (11) Gonzaga 76, (7) Louisville 69
      - The Zags become the lowest seed ever to make a regional final in the women's tournament.
    - (1) Stanford 72, (5) North Carolina 65
- NCAA Division II Men's Tournament – Final in Springfield, Massachusetts:
  - Bellarmine 71, BYU–Hawaiʻi 68

==== Cricket ====
- World Cup:
  - Quarter-final: England 229/6 (50 overs); Sri Lanka 231/0 (39.3 overs; Tillakaratne Dilshan 108*, Upul Tharanga 102*) in Colombo, Sri Lanka. **Sri Lanka win by 10 wickets.**

==== Curling ====
- World Women's Championship in Esbjerg, Denmark:
  - 3 vs. 4 playoff: Denmark 7–10 **Canada**
  - Semifinal: China 5–8 **Canada**

==== Cycling ====
- UCI Track World Championships in Apeldoorn, Netherlands:
  - Women's sprint: (gold) Anna Meares (AUS) (silver) Simona Krupeckaitė (LTU) (bronze) Victoria Pendleton (GBR)
  - Men's keirin: (gold) Shane Perkins (AUS) (silver) Chris Hoy (GBR) (bronze) Teun Mulder (NED)
  - Men's omnium: (gold) Michael Freiberg (AUS) (silver) Shane Archbold (NZL) (bronze) Gijs Van Hoecke (BEL)
  - Women's scratch: (gold) Marianne Vos (NED) (silver) Katherine Bates (AUS) (bronze) Danielle King (GBR)
- UCI World Tour:
  - Volta a Catalunya, Stage 6: (gold) José Joaquín Rojas (ESP) (Movistar Team) 4h 22' 19" (silver) Manuel Antonio Cardoso (POR) (Team RadioShack) s.t. (bronze) Samuel Dumoulin (FRA) (Cofidis) s.t.
    - General classification (after stage 6): (1) Alberto Contador (ESP) (Saxo Bank–SunGard) 26h 50' 47" (2) Levi Leipheimer (USA) (Team RadioShack) + 23" (3) Michele Scarponi (ITA) (Lampre–ISD) + 23"

==== Equestrianism ====
- FEI Dressage World Cup:
  - Western European League, 10th competition in 's-Hertogenbosch (CDI-W): (gold) Adelinde Cornelissen (NED) on Parzival (silver) Isabell Werth (GER) on Warum Nicht FRH (bronze) Hans Peter Minderhoud (NED) on Nadine
    - Final standings: (1) Cornelissen 80 points (2) Ulla Salzgeber (GER) & Werth 77
      - Cornelissen, Salzgeber and Werth along with six other riders qualify for the World Cup Final.
  - Central European League Final in Warsaw (CDI-W): (gold) Katarzyna Milczarek (POL) on Ekwador (silver) Robert Acs (HUN) on Weinzauber (bronze) Sergey Puzko (UKR) on Kompliment
    - Milczarek and Acs qualify for the World Cup Final.

==== Football (soccer) ====
- UEFA Euro 2012 qualifying, matchday 5:
  - Group A: Germany 4–0 Kazakhstan
    - Standings: Germany 15 points (5 matches), Belgium 7 (5), Austria 7 (4), Turkey 6 (4), Azerbaijan 3 (3), Kazakhstan 0 (5).
  - Group B:
    - Armenia 0–0 Russia
    - Andorra 0–1 Slovakia
    - Republic of Ireland 2–1 North Macedonia
      - Standings (after 5 matches): Slovakia, Russia, Republic of Ireland 10 points, Armenia 8, Macedonia 4, Andorra 0.
  - Group D:
    - Bosnia and Herzegovina 2–1 Romania
    - Albania 1–0 Belarus
      - Standings: France 12 points (5 matches), Belarus, Albania 8 (5), Bosnia and Herzegovina 7 (4), Romania 2 (4), Luxembourg 1 (5).
  - Group F:
    - Georgia 1–0 Croatia
    - Israel 2–1 Latvia
    - Malta 0–1 Greece
      - Standings (after 5 matches): Greece 11 points, Croatia 10, Georgia 9, Israel 7, Latvia 4, Malta 0.
  - Group G:
    - Wales 0–2 England
    - Bulgaria 0–0 Switzerland
      - Standings (after 4 matches): England, Montenegro 10 points, Switzerland, Bulgaria 4, Wales 0.
  - Group H:
    - Cyprus 0–0 Iceland
    - Norway 1–1 Denmark
      - Standings (after 4 matches): Norway 10 points, Portugal, Denmark 7, Cyprus 2, Iceland 1.
- Africa Cup of Nations qualification, matchday 3 (team in **bold** qualifies for the 2012 Africa Cup of Nations):
  - Group A:
    - Cape Verde 4–2 Liberia
    - Mali 1–0 Zimbabwe
      - Standings (after 3 matches): Cape Verde Islands 7 points, Mali 6, Zimbabwe 2, Liberia 1.
  - Group D: Tanzania 2–1 Central African Republic
    - Standings: Morocco 4 points (2 matches), Tanzania, Central African Republic 4 (3), Algeria 1 (2).
  - Group E: Senegal 1–0 Cameroon
    - Standings: Senegal 9 points (3 matches), Cameroon 4 (3), DR Congo 1 (2), Mauritius 0 (2).
  - Group F: Burkina Faso 4–0 Namibia
    - Standings (after 2 matches): Burkina Faso 6 points, Gambia 3, Namibia 0.
  - Group G: South Africa 1–0 Egypt
    - Standings: South Africa 7 points (3 matches), Niger 3 (2), Sierra Leone 2 (2), Egypt 1 (3).
  - Group H: Rwanda 3–1 Burundi
    - Standings: Ivory Coast 6 points (2 matches), Benin 4 (2), Rwanda 3 (3), Burundi 1 (3).
  - Group J:
    - Kenya 2–1 Angola
    - Guinea-Bissau 0–1 Uganda
      - Standings (after 3 matches): Uganda 7 points, Kenya 4, Angola, Guinea-Bissau 3.
  - Group K:
    - Malawi 1–0 Togo
    - Chad 0–1 **Botswana**
      - Standings: Botswana 16 points (6 matches), Malawi 9 (5), Tunisia 7 (5), Togo 3 (6), Chad 2 (6).
- Friendly internationals: (top 10 in FIFA World Rankings)
  - United States 1–1 (4) Argentina
  - (9) Portugal 1–1 Chile

==== Horse racing ====
- Dubai World Cup in Dubai, United Arab Emirates: (gold) Victoire Pisa (trainer: Katsuhiko Sumii; jockey: Mirco Demuro) (silver) Transcend (trainer: Takayuki Yasuda; jockey: Shinji Fujita) (bronze) Monterosso (trainer: Mahmood Al Zarooni; jockey: Mickael Barzalona)
  - Victoire Pisa becomes the first horse from Japan to win the race.

==== Mixed martial arts ====
- UFC Fight Night: Seattle in Seattle, Washington, United States:
  - Light heavyweight bout: **Phil Davis** (USA) def. Antônio Rogério Nogueira (BRA) via unanimous decision (30–27, 30–27, 30–27)
  - Welterweight bout: **Anthony Johnson** (USA) def. Dan Hardy (ENG) via unanimous decision (30–27, 30–27, 30–27)
  - Welterweight bout: **Amir Sadollah** (USA) def. DaMarques Johnson (USA) via submission (strikes)
  - Featherweight bout: **Jung Chan-Sung** (KOR) def. Leonard Garcia (USA) via submission (twister)

==== Rowing ====
- 157th University Boat Race on the River Thames, London: ((GBR) unless stated)
  - Oxford University Boat Club (Moritz Hafner (GER), Ben Myers, Alec Dent, Ben Ellison, Karl Hudspith, Constantine Louloudis, George Whittaker, Simon Hislop, Sam Winter-Levy) beat Cambridge University Boat Club (Mike Thorp, Joel Jennings, Dan Rix-Standing, Hardy Cubasch (AUS), George Nash, Geoff Roth (CAN), Derek Rasmussen (USA), David Nelson (AUS), Liz Box) by 4 lengths.
    - Oxford cut Cambridge's overall lead to 80–76, with one dead heat.

==== Snowboarding ====
- World Cup in Arosa, Switzerland:
  - Men's halfpipe: (gold) Yuri Podladchikov (SUI) 27.6 points (silver) Jan Scherrer (SUI) 27.2 (bronze) Patrick Burgener (SUI) 26.9
    - Final halfpipe standings: (1) Nathan Johnstone (AUS) 3510 points (2) Ryō Aono (JPN) 2800 (3) Arthur Longo (FRA) 1600
      - Johnstone wins his first halfpipe World Cup.
    - Final freestyle overall standings: (1) Johnstone 3510 points (2) Clemens Schattschneider (AUT) 2960 (3) Aono 2800
  - Women's halfpipe: (gold) Queralt Castellet (ESP) 27.0 points (silver) Holly Crawford (AUS) 25.5 (bronze) Cai Xuetong (CHN) 24.7
    - Castellet takes Spain's first victory in any World Cup event.
    - Final halfpipe standings: (1) Cai 4400 points (2) Crawford 3900 (3) Sun Zhifeng (CHN) 2300
      - Cai wins her second consecutive halfpipe World Cup.
    - Final freestyle overall standings: (1) Cai 4400 points (2) Crawford 3900 (3) Sun 2300

==== Volleyball ====
- Men's CEV Champions League Final Four in Bolzano, Italy:
  - Semifinals:
    - Jastrzębski Węgiel (Poland) 0–3 (Italy) **Trentino BetClic**
    - Dynamo Moscow (Russia) 0–3 (Russia) **Zenit Kazan**

=== March 25, 2011 (Friday) ===
==== Basketball ====
- NCAA Division I Men's Tournament (seeds in parentheses):
  - East Regional Semifinals in Newark, New Jersey:
    - (2) North Carolina 81, (11) Marquette 63
    - (4) Kentucky 62, (1) Ohio State 60
  - Southwest Regional Semifinals in San Antonio, Texas:
    - (1) Kansas 77, (12) Richmond 57
    - (11) VCU 72, (10) Florida State 71 (OT)
- NCAA Division II Women's Tournament – Final in St. Joseph, Missouri:
  - Clayton State 69, Michigan Tech 50

==== Cricket ====
- World Cup:
  - Quarter-final: New Zealand 221/8 (50 overs); South Africa 172 (43.2 overs) in Dhaka, Bangladesh. **New Zealand win by 49 runs.**

==== Curling ====
- World Women's Championship in Esbjerg, Denmark:
  - Tiebreaker: **Canada** 8–6 Switzerland
  - 1 vs. 2 playoff: **Sweden** 7–6 China
    - Sweden advance to the final.

==== Cycling ====
- UCI Track World Championships in Apeldoorn, Netherlands:
  - Men's points race: (gold) Edwin Alcibiades Avila (COL) 33 points (silver) Cameron Meyer (AUS) 25 (bronze) Morgan Kneisky (FRA) 23
  - Women's individual pursuit: (gold) Sarah Hammer (USA) 3:32.933 (silver) Alison Shanks (NZL) 3:33.229 (bronze) Vilija Sereikaitė (LTU) 3:37.643
  - Men's sprint: (gold) Grégory Baugé (FRA) (silver) Jason Kenny (GBR) (bronze) Chris Hoy (GBR)
- UCI World Tour:
  - Volta a Catalunya, Stage 5: (gold) Samuel Dumoulin (FRA) (Cofidis) 4h 49' 31" (silver) José Joaquín Rojas (ESP) (Movistar Team) s.t. (bronze) Rubén Pérez (ESP) (Euskaltel–Euskadi) s.t.
    - General classification (after stage 5): (1) Alberto Contador (ESP) (Saxo Bank–SunGard) 22h 28' 28" (2) Levi Leipheimer (USA) (Team RadioShack) + 23" (3) Michele Scarponi (ITA) (Lampre–ISD) + 23"

==== Football (soccer) ====
- UEFA Euro 2012 qualifying, matchday 5:
  - Group A: Austria 0–2 Belgium
    - Standings: Germany 12 points (4 matches), Belgium 7 (5), Austria 7 (4), Turkey 6 (4), Azerbaijan 3 (3), Kazakhstan 0 (4).
  - Group C:
    - Serbia 2–1 Northern Ireland
    - Slovenia 0–1 Italy
      - Standings: Italy 13 points (5 matches), Slovenia, Serbia 7 (5), Estonia 6 (4), Northern Ireland 5 (4), Faroe Islands 1 (5).
  - Group D: Luxembourg 0–2 France
    - Standings: France 12 points (5 matches), Belarus 8 (4), Albania 5 (4), Bosnia and Herzegovina 4 (3), Romania 2 (3), Luxembourg 1 (5).
  - Group E: Hungary 0–4 Netherlands
    - Standings: Netherlands 15 points (5 matches), Hungary 9 (5), Sweden 6 (3), Moldova 6 (4), Finland 3 (4), San Marino 0 (5).
  - Group I: Spain 2–1 Czech Republic
    - David Villa scores both goals to become Spain's highest goalscorer, with a tally of 46, two ahead of Raúl.
    - Standings: Spain 12 points (4 matches), Czech Republic 6 (4), Scotland 4 (4), Lithuania 4 (3), Liechtenstein 0 (3).
- Friendly international: (top 10 in FIFA World Rankings)
  - Estonia 2–0 (7) Uruguay
- South American Under-17 Championship in Ecuador: (teams in **bold** advance to the final round)
  - Group B:
    - **Paraguay** 3–1 Venezuela
    - **Colombia** 1–5 **Brazil**
      - Final standings: Brazil, Paraguay 9 points, Colombia 7, Chile 4, Venezuela 0.

==== Snowboarding ====
- World Cup in Arosa, Switzerland:
  - Men's snowboard cross: (gold) Alex Pullin (AUS) (silver) Luca Matteotti (ITA) (bronze) Nick Baumgartner (USA)
    - Final snowboard cross standings: (1) Pullin 3270 points (2) Pierre Vaultier (FRA) 3210 (3) Jonathan Cheever (USA) 2690
      - Pullin wins his first World Cup title.
    - Overall standings: (1) Benjamin Karl (AUT) 4950 points (2) Andreas Prommegger (AUT) 4210 (3) Roland Fischnaller (ITA) 4110
  - Women's snowboard cross: (gold) Aleksandra Zhekova (BUL) (silver) Lindsey Jacobellis (USA) (bronze) Nelly Moenne Loccoz (FRA)
    - Final snowboard cross standings: (1) Dominique Maltais (CAN) 4800 points (2) Zhekova 4040 (3) Jacobellis 3610
      - Maltais wins her second snowboard cross World Cup title.
    - Overall standings: (1) Yekaterina Tudegesheva (RUS) 6000 points (2) Maltais 4800 (3) Fränzi Mägert-Kohli (SUI) 4050

=== March 24, 2011 (Thursday) ===
==== Basketball ====
- EuroCup Women Final, second leg (first leg score in parentheses):
  - ASPTT Arras (France) 53–61 (61–61) (Israel) **Elitzur Ramla**. Elitzur Ramla win 122–114 on aggregate.
    - Elitzur Ramla become the first Israeli women's team to win a European title in any sport.
- Euroleague Quarterfinals, game 2 (best-of-5 series):
  - Caja Laboral (Spain) 81–83 (Israel) Maccabi Tel Aviv. Series tied 1–1.
  - Regal FC Barcelona (Spain) 71–75 (Greece) Panathinaikos BC. Series tied 1–1.
  - Real Madrid (Spain) 75–81 (Spain) Power Electronics Valencia. Series tied 1–1.
  - Olympiacos Piraeus (Greece) 65–82 (Italy) Montepaschi Siena. Series tied 1–1.
- NCAA Division I Men's Tournament (seeds in parentheses):
  - West Regional Semifinals in Anaheim, California:
    - (3) Connecticut 74, (2) San Diego State 67
    - (5) Arizona 93, (1) Duke 77
  - Southeast Regional Semifinals in New Orleans, Louisiana:
    - (2) Florida 83, (3) BYU 74 (OT)
    - (8) Butler 61, (4) Wisconsin 54

==== Cricket ====
- World Cup:
  - Quarter-final: Australia 260/5 (50 overs, Ricky Ponting 104); India 261/5 (47.4 overs) in Ahmedabad, India. **India win by 5 wickets.**

==== Curling ====
- World Women's Championship in Esbjerg, Denmark (teams in **bold** advance to the playoffs, teams in italics advance to a tiebreaker):
  - Draw 15:
    - Czech Republic 4–6 United States
    - South Korea 2–9 Canada
    - Switzerland 9–3 Scotland
    - China 8–5 Russia
  - Draw 16:
    - Denmark 5–7 **China**
    - Scotland 6–3 Norway
    - Canada 8–6 Germany
    - Czech Republic 6–7 **Sweden**
  - Draw 17:
    - Switzerland 7–4 Norway
    - Russia 3–10 **Denmark**
    - **Sweden** 3–8 United States
    - Germany 6–5 South Korea
      - Final standings: Sweden 9–2; China 8–3; Denmark, Canada, Switzerland 7–4; Russia, United States 6–5; Germany 5–6; Scotland 4–7; Norway 3–8; South Korea, Czech Republic 2–9.

==== Cycling ====
- UCI Track World Championships in Apeldoorn, Netherlands:
  - Women's team pursuit: (gold) Great Britain (Laura Trott, Wendy Houvenaghel, Danielle King) 3:23.419 (silver) United States (Sarah Hammer, Dotsie Bausch, Jennie Reed) 3:25.308 (bronze) New Zealand (Kaytee Boyd, Jaime Nielsen, Alison Shanks) 3:24.065
  - Women's team sprint: (gold) Australia (Anna Meares, Kaarle McCulloch) 33.237 (silver) Great Britain (Jessica Varnish, Victoria Pendleton) 33.525 (bronze) China (Gong Jinjie, Guo Shuang) 33.586
  - Men's individual pursuit: (gold) Jack Bobridge (AUS) 4:21.141 (silver) Jesse Sergent (NZL) 4:23.865 (bronze) Michael Hepburn (AUS) 4:22.553
- UCI World Tour:
  - Volta a Catalunya, Stage 4: (gold) Manuel Antonio Cardoso (POR) (Team RadioShack) 4h 33' 02" (silver) Giacomo Nizzolo (ITA) (Leopard Trek) s.t. (bronze) José Joaquín Rojas (ESP) (Movistar Team) s.t.
    - General classification (after stage 4): (1) Alberto Contador (ESP) (Saxo Bank–SunGard) 17h 38' 57" (2) Levi Leipheimer (USA) (Team RadioShack) + 23" (3) Michele Scarponi (ITA) (Lampre–ISD) + 23"

==== Darts ====
- Premier League, week 7 in Brighton, England:
  - Mark Webster (WAL) 2–8 Simon Whitlock (AUS)
  - Adrian Lewis (ENG) 7–7 Terry Jenkins (ENG)
  - Raymond van Barneveld (NED) 8–5 Gary Anderson (SCO)
  - Phil Taylor (ENG) 8–1 James Wade (ENG)
    - Standings (after 7 matches): Taylor 12 points, van Barneveld 10, Anderson 8, Lewis 7, Whitlock 6, Jenkins 5, Webster, Wade 4.

==== Football (soccer) ====
- South American Under-17 Championship in Ecuador (teams in **bold** advance to the final group):
  - Group A:
    - **Uruguay** 0–3 Peru
    - **Argentina** 2–0 **Ecuador**
      - Final standings: Argentina 9 points, Ecuador 7, Uruguay 6, Peru 4, Bolivia 3.
- Copa Libertadores second stage (team in **bold** advances to the knockout stage):
  - Group 2: Oriente Petrolero (Bolivia) 2–0 (Peru) León de Huánuco
    - Standings: (Colombia) **Junior** 12 points (4 matches), (Brazil) Grêmio 7 (4), León de Huánuco 4 (5), Oriente Petrolero 3 (5).
  - Group 4: Vélez Sársfield (Argentina) 2–1 (Chile) Unión Española
    - Standings (after 4 matches): (Chile) Universidad Católica 7 points, Vélez Sársfield, (Venezuela) Caracas 6, Unión Española 4.

==== Snooker ====
- Championship League:
  - Final: **Matthew Stevens** (WAL) 3–1 Shaun Murphy (ENG)
    - Stevens wins his seventh professional title and qualifies for the Premier League.

==== Snowboarding ====
- World Cup in Arosa, Switzerland:
  - Men's snowboard cross: (gold) Seth Wescott (USA) (silver) Pierre Vaultier (FRA) (bronze) Paul-Henri de Le Rue (FRA)
    - Snowboard cross standings (after 6 of 7 races): (1) Vaultier 2890 points (2) Jonathan Cheever (USA) 2690 (3) Alex Pullin (AUS) 2288
    - Overall standings: (1) Benjamin Karl (AUT) 4950 points (2) Andreas Prommegger (AUT) 4210 (3) Roland Fischnaller (ITA) 4110
  - Women's snowboard cross: (gold) Aleksandra Zhekova (BUL) (silver) Callan Chythlook-Sifsof (USA) (bronze) Zoe Gillings (GBR)
    - Snowboard cross standings (after 6 of 7 races): (1) Dominique Maltais (CAN) 4800 points (2) Zhekova 3200 (3) Lindsey Jacobellis (USA) 2810
    - Overall standings: (1) Yekaterina Tudegesheva (RUS) 6000 points (2) Maltais 4800 (3) Fränzi Mägert-Kohli (SUI) 4050

=== March 23, 2011 (Wednesday) ===
==== Cricket ====
- World Cup:
  - Quarter-final: West Indies 112 (43.3 overs); Pakistan 113/0 (20.5 overs) in Dhaka, Bangladesh. **Pakistan win by 10 wickets.**

==== Curling ====
- World Women's Championship in Esbjerg, Denmark: (teams in **bold** advance to the playoffs)
  - Draw 12:
    - Russia 5–3 Germany
    - Sweden 9–8 Switzerland
    - Denmark 7–4 South Korea
    - Norway 5–6 United States
  - Draw 13:
    - South Korea 9–3 Scotland
    - China 14–5 United States
    - Russia 12–3 Czech Republic
    - Switzerland 4–7 Canada
  - Draw 14:
    - **Sweden** 5–4 Canada
    - Germany 7–3 Czech Republic
    - China 6–4 Norway
    - Denmark 12–5 Scotland
      - Standings (after Draw 14): Sweden 8–1; Russia, China, Denmark 6–3; Canada, Switzerland 5–4; United States, Germany 4–5; Norway, Scotland 3–6; Czech Republic, South Korea 2–7.

==== Cycling ====
- UCI Track World Championships in Apeldoorn, Netherlands:
  - Women's 500 m time trial: (gold) Olga Panarina (BLR) 33.896 (silver) Sandie Clair (FRA) 33.919 (bronze) Miriam Welte (GER) 34.496
  - Men's team pursuit: (gold) Australia (Jack Bobridge, Rohan Dennis, Michael Hepburn, Luke Durbridge) 3:57.832 (silver) Russia (Alexei Markov, Evgeny Kovalev, Ivan Kovalev, Alexander Serov) 4:02.229 (bronze) Great Britain (Steven Burke, Peter Kennaugh, Andy Tennant, Sam Harrison) 4:02.781
  - Women's points race: (gold) Tatsiana Sharakova (BLR) 30 points (silver) Jarmila Machačová (CZE) 20 (bronze) Giorgia Bronzini (ITA) 14
  - Men's scratch: (gold) Kwok Ho Ting (HKG) (silver) Elia Viviani (ITA) (bronze) Morgan Kneisky (FRA)
  - Men's team sprint: (gold) France (Grégory Baugé, Michaël D'Almeida, Kévin Sireau) 43.867 (silver) Germany (René Enders, Maximilian Levy, Stefan Nimke) 44.483 (bronze) Great Britain (Matthew Crampton, Chris Hoy, Jason Kenny) 44.235
- UCI World Tour:
  - Volta a Catalunya, Stage 3: (gold) Alberto Contador (ESP) (Saxo Bank–SunGard) 4h 45' 31" (silver) Michele Scarponi (ITA) (Lampre–ISD) + 23" (bronze) Levi Leipheimer (USA) (Team RadioShack) + 23"
    - General classification (after stage 3): (1) Contador 13h 05' 55" (2) Leipheimer + 23" (3) Scarponi + 23"

==== Football (soccer) ====
- Copa Libertadores second stage:
  - Group 3: Fluminense (Brazil) 3–2 (Mexico) América
    - Standings (after 4 matches): (Argentina) Argentinos Juniors 7 points, América 6, Fluminense 5, (Uruguay) Nacional 4.
  - Group 8: Godoy Cruz (Argentina) 1–1 (Argentina) Independiente
    - Standings (after 4 matches): Godoy Cruz 7 points, (Ecuador) LDU Quito, (Uruguay) Peñarol 6, Independiente 4.
- UEFA Women's Champions League quarter-finals, second leg (first leg scores in parentheses):
  - **Duisburg** (Germany) 2–1 (3–1) (England) Everton. Duisburg win 5–2 on aggregate.
  - **Lyon** (France) 1–0 (0–0) (Russia) Zvezda 2005 Perm. Lyon win 1–0 on aggregate.
  - Linköpings (Sweden) 2–2 (1–1) (England) **Arsenal**. 3–3 on aggregate, Arsenal win on away goals.
  - **Turbine Potsdam** (Germany) 6–2 (3–0) (France) Juvisy. Turbine Potsdam win 9–2 on aggregate.

=== March 22, 2011 (Tuesday) ===
==== Basketball ====
- Euroleague Quarterfinals, game 1:
  - Caja Laboral (Spain) 76–70 (Israel) Maccabi Tel Aviv. Caja Laboral lead series 1–0.
  - Regal FC Barcelona (Spain) 83–82 (Greece) Panathinaikos BC. Barcelona lead series 1–0.
  - Real Madrid (Spain) 71–65 (Spain) Power Electronics Valencia. Real Madrid lead series 1–0.
  - Olympiacos Piraeus (Greece) 89–41 (Italy) Montepaschi Siena. Olympiacos lead series 1–0.
    - Olympiacos lead 47–9 at half time en route to the most lopsided win in Euroleague knockout stage history.
- Women's Division I Tournament (seeds in parentheses):
  - Dayton Regional, second round:
    - In Charlottesville, Virginia: (6) Oklahoma 88, (3) Miami (FL) 83
  - Philadelphia Regional, second round:
    - In Storrs, Connecticut: (1) Connecticut 64, (9) Purdue 40
    - In College Park, Maryland: (5) Georgetown 79, (4) Maryland 57
  - Spokane Regional, second round:
    - In Cincinnati, Ohio: (7) Louisville 85, (2) Xavier 75
  - Dallas Regional, second round:
    - In Auburn, Alabama: (6) Georgia 61, (3) Florida State 59
    - In Bossier City, Louisiana: (2) Texas A&M 70, (7) Rutgers 48
    - In Wichita, Kansas: (5) Green Bay 65, (4) Michigan State 56
    - In Waco, Texas: (1) Baylor 82, (9) West Virginia 68

==== Curling ====
- World Women's Championship in Esbjerg, Denmark:
  - Draw 9:
    - Canada 7–4 Czech Republic
    - Norway 3–7 Germany
    - Scotland 2–8 China
    - Sweden 8–3 Denmark
  - Draw 10:
    - Norway 3–8 Denmark
    - United States 8–6 South Korea
    - Germany 5–7 Sweden
    - Russia 7–9 Switzerland
  - Draw 11:
    - China 6–7 Switzerland
    - Scotland 6–8 Russia
    - United States 6–9 Canada
    - South Korea 11–2 Czech Republic
      - Standings (after Draw 11): Sweden 6–1; Switzerland 5–2; Canada, China, Denmark, Russia 4–3; Germany, Norway, Scotland, United States 3–4; Czech Republic 2–5; South Korea 1–6.

==== Cycling ====
- UCI World Tour:
  - Volta a Catalunya, Stage 2: (gold) Alessandro Petacchi (ITA) (Lampre–ISD) 4h 11' 08" (silver) José Joaquín Rojas (ESP) (Movistar Team) s.t. (bronze) Manuel Antonio Cardoso (POR) (Team RadioShack) s.t.
    - General classification (after stage 2): (1) Gatis Smukulis (LAT) (HTC–Highroad) 8h 19' 56" (2) Petacchi + 28" (3) Rojas + 28"

==== Football (soccer) ====
- South American Under-17 Championship in Ecuador (teams in **bold** advance to the final group):
  - Group A: **Argentina** 3–0 Bolivia
    - Standings: **Ecuador** 7 points (3 matches), Argentina, **Uruguay** 6 (3), Bolivia 3 (4), Peru 1 (3).
  - Group B:
    - **Paraguay** 3–0 Chile
    - **Colombia** 1–0 Venezuela
      - Standings: Colombia 7 points (3 matches), Paraguay, **Brazil** 6 (3), Chile 4 (4), Venezuela 0 (3).
- Copa Libertadores second stage (team in **bold** advances to the knockout stage):
  - Group 1:
    - **Libertad** (Paraguay) 2–2 (Colombia) Once Caldas
    - San Luis (Mexico) 3–1 (Peru) Universidad San Martín
      - Standings (after 5 matches): Libertad 11 points, Universidad San Martín 6, San Luis 5, Once Caldas 4.
  - Group 4: Caracas (Venezuela) 0–2 (Chile) Universidad Católica
    - Standings: Universidad Católica 7 points (4 matches), Caracas 6 (4), (Chile) Unión Española 4 (3), (Argentina) Vélez Sársfield 3 (3).

==== Snooker ====
- Championship League Group 7:
  - Final: Liang Wenbo (CHN) 0–3 **Matthew Stevens** (WAL)
    - Stevens advances to the winners group.

=== March 21, 2011 (Monday) ===
==== Basketball ====
- Women's Division I Tournament (seeds in parentheses):
  - Dayton Regional, second round:
    - In Knoxville, Tennessee: (1) Tennessee 79, (8) Marquette 70
    - In Columbus, Ohio: (4) Ohio State 67, (5) Georgia Tech 60
    - In Salt Lake City, Utah: (2) Notre Dame 77, (10) Temple 64
  - Philadelphia Regional, second round:
    - In University Park, Pennsylvania: (3) DePaul 75, (6) Penn State 73
    - In Durham, North Carolina: (2) Duke 71, (10) Marist 66
  - Spokane Regional, second round:
    - In Spokane, Washington: (11) Gonzaga 89, (3) UCLA 75
      - Gonzaga point guard Courtney Vandersloot becomes the first Division I player of either sex to record 2,000 points and 1,000 assists in a career.
    - In Stanford, California: (1) Stanford 75, (9) St. John's 49
    - In Albuquerque, New Mexico: (5) North Carolina 86, (4) Kentucky 74

==== Curling ====
- World Women's Championship in Esbjerg, Denmark:
  - Draw 6:
    - United States 4–11 Russia
    - Canada 3–7 Scotland
    - South Korea 6–8 Switzerland
    - Czech Republic 3–9 China
  - Draw 7:
    - Germany 3–9 Scotland
    - China 5–7 Sweden
    - Czech Republic 2–9 Denmark
    - Canada 7–5 Norway
  - Draw 8:
    - Sweden 10–7 South Korea
    - Switzerland 3–6 Denmark
    - Norway 9–8 Russia
    - United States 9–4 Germany
      - Standings (after Draw 8): Sweden 4–1; China, Denmark, Norway, Russia, Scotland, Switzerland 3–2; Canada, Czech Republic, Germany, United States 2–3; South Korea 0–5.

==== Cycling ====
- UCI World Tour:
  - Volta a Catalunya, Stage 1 & General classification: (gold) Gatis Smukulis (LAT) (HTC–Highroad) 4h 08' 48" (silver) Alessandro Petacchi (ITA) (Lampre–ISD) + 28" (bronze) José Joaquín Rojas (ESP) (Movistar Team) + 28"

==== Football (soccer) ====
- South American Under-17 Championship in Ecuador (team in **bold** advances to the final group):
  - Group A:
    - **Ecuador** 1–0 Uruguay
    - Argentina – Bolivia — suspended after 77 minutes due to a power outage.
      - Standings: Ecuador 7 points (3 matches), Uruguay 6 (3), Argentina 3 (2), Bolivia 3 (3), Peru 1 (3).
- CAF Confederation Cup First round, first leg: Wits (South Africa) 1–1 (Madagascar) AS Adema

==== Golf ====
- European Tour:
  - Sicilian Open in Ragusa, Italy:
    - Winner: Raphaël Jacquelin (FRA) 272 (−12)
      - Jacquelin wins his third European Tour title, and first since 2007.

=== March 20, 2011 (Sunday) ===
==== Alpine skiing ====
- World Cup in Lenzerheide, Switzerland:
  - Team event: (gold) Germany (Viktoria Rebensburg, Maria Riesch, Susanne Riesch, Fritz Dopfer, Stephan Keppler, Felix Neureuther) (silver) Italy (Federica Brignone, Giulia Gianesini, Denise Karbon, Cristian Deville, Manfred Mölgg, Giuliano Razzoli) (bronze) Austria (Anna Fenninger, Elisabeth Görgl, Michaela Kirchgasser, Romed Baumann, Hannes Reichelt, Philipp Schörghofer)

==== Athletics ====
- IAAF World Cross Country Championships in Punta Umbría, Spain:
  - Women's junior race: (gold) Faith Chepngetich Kipyegon (KEN) 18:53 (silver) Genet Yalew (ETH) 18:54 (bronze) Azemra Gebru (ETH) 18:54
  - Men's junior race: (gold) Geoffrey Kipsang Kamworor (KEN) 22:21 (silver) Thomas Ayeko (UGA) 22:27 (bronze) Patrick Mutunga Mwikya (KEN) 22:32
  - Women's senior race: (gold) Vivian Cheruiyot (KEN) 24:58 (silver) Linet Masai (KEN) 25:07 (bronze) Shalane Flanagan (USA) 25:10
  - Men's senior race: (gold) Imane Merga (ETH) 33:50 (silver) Paul Kipngetich Tanui (KEN) 33:52 (bronze) Vincent Chepkok (KEN) 33:53
- European Cup Winter Throwing in Sofia, Bulgaria, day 2:
  - Discus women: (gold) Olesya Korotkova (RUS) 60.20 m (silver) Nicoleta Grasu (ROU) 59.44 m (bronze) Vera Ganeyeva (RUS) 57.45 m
  - Hammer women: (gold) Tatyana Lysenko (RUS) 73.70 m (silver) Betty Heidler (GER) 72.71 m (bronze) Zalina Marghieva (MDA) 71.96 m
  - Javelin men: (gold) Zigismunds Sirmais (LAT) 84.47 m (WJR) (silver) Oleksandr Pyatnytsya (RUS) 81.96 m (bronze) Valeriy Iordan (RUS) 79.49 m
  - Shot put men: (gold) Hamza Alić (BIH) 20.21 m (silver) Marco Fortes (POR) 20.18 m (bronze) Soslan Tsirikov (RUS) 19.45 m

==== Auto racing ====
- Sprint Cup Series:
  - Jeff Byrd 500 in Bristol, Tennessee: (1) (Nevada) Kyle Busch (Toyota; Joe Gibbs Racing) (2) (Missouri) Carl Edwards (Ford; Roush Fenway Racing) (3) (California) Jimmie Johnson (Chevrolet; Hendrick Motorsports)
    - Drivers' championship standings (after 4 of 36 races): (1) (Nevada) Kurt Busch (Dodge; Penske Racing) 150 points (2) Edwards 149 (3) (Indiana) Tony Stewart (Chevrolet; Stewart Haas Racing) & (Indiana) Ryan Newman (Chevrolet; Stewart Haas Racing) 138
- V8 Supercars:
  - Clipsal 500 in Adelaide, South Australia:
    - Race 4: (1) Jamie Whincup (AUS) (Triple Eight Race Engineering, Holden VE Commodore) (2) Rick Kelly (AUS) (Kelly Racing; Holden VE Commodore) (3) Mark Winterbottom (AUS) (Ford Performance Racing, Ford FG Falcon)
      - Drivers' championship standings (after 4 of 27 races): (1) Whincup 567 points (2) Winterbottom 423 (3) Garth Tander (AUS) (Holden Racing Team, Holden VE Commodore) 363
- World Touring Car Championship:
  - Race of Brazil in Curitiba:
    - Race 1: (1) Rob Huff (GBR) (Chevrolet; Chevrolet Cruze) (2) Yvan Muller (FRA) (Chevrolet; Chevrolet Cruze) (3) Cacá Bueno (BRA) (Chevrolet; Chevrolet Cruze)
    - Race 2: (1) Alain Menu (SUI) (Chevrolet; Chevrolet Cruze) (2) Tom Coronel (NED) (ROAL Motorsport; BMW 320 TC) (3) Muller
      - Drivers' championship standings (after 2 of 22 races): (1) Huff 37 points (2) Menu & Muller 33

==== Basketball ====
- NCAA Division I Men's Tournament (seeds in parentheses):
  - East Regional, third round:
    - In Charlotte, North Carolina: (2) North Carolina 86, (7) Washington 83
    - In Cleveland, Ohio:
      - (1) Ohio State 98, (8) George Mason 66
      - (11) Marquette 66, (3) Syracuse 62
  - Southwest Regional, third round:
    - In Chicago, Illinois:
      - (11) VCU 94, (3) Purdue 76
      - (10) Florida State 71, (2) Notre Dame 57
    - In Tulsa, Oklahoma: (1) Kansas 73, (9) Illinois 59
  - West Regional, third round:
    - In Charlotte, North Carolina: (1) Duke 73, (8) Michigan 71
    - In Tulsa, Oklahoma: (5) Arizona 70, (4) Texas 69
- Women's Division I Tournament (seeds in parentheses):
  - Philadelphia Regional, first round:
    - In Storrs, Connecticut:
      - (1) Connecticut 75, (16) Hartford 39
      - (9) Purdue 53, (8) Kansas State 45
    - In College Park, Maryland:
      - (4) Maryland 70, (13) St. Francis (PA) 48
      - (5) Georgetown 65, (12) Princeton 49
  - Spokane Regional, first round:
    - In Cincinnati, Ohio:
      - (7) Louisville 81, (10) Vanderbilt 62
      - (2) Xavier 72, (15) South Dakota State 56
  - Dayton Regional, first round:
    - In Charlottesville, Virginia:
      - (3) Miami (FL) 80, (14) Gardner–Webb 62
      - (6) Oklahoma 86, (11) James Madison 72
  - Dallas Regional, first round:
    - In Bossier City, Louisiana:
      - (2) Texas A&M 87, (15) McNeese State 47
      - (7) Rutgers 76, (10) Louisiana Tech 51
    - In Waco, Texas:
      - (9) West Virginia 79, (8) Houston 73
      - (1) Baylor 66, (16) Prairie View A&M 30
    - In Auburn, Alabama:
      - (3) Florida State 76, (14) Samford 46
      - (6) Georgia 56, (11) Middle Tennessee 41
    - In Wichita, Kansas:
      - (5) Green Bay 59, (12) Arkansas–Little Rock 55
      - (4) Michigan State 69, (13) Northern Iowa 66

==== Biathlon ====
- World Cup 9 in Holmenkollen, Norway:
  - Women's 12.5 km mass start: (gold) Darya Domracheva (BLR) 36:13.0 (1+0+0+2) (silver) Anna Bogaliy-Titovets (RUS) 36:29.0 (0+0+0+1) (bronze) Olga Zaitseva (RUS) 36:38.0 (0+0+1+0)
    - Final mass start standings: (1) Domracheva 236 points (2) Magdalena Neuner (GER) 228 (3) Tora Berger (NOR) 206
      - Domracheva wins her first World Cup discipline title.
    - Final overall standings: (1) Kaisa Mäkäräinen (FIN) 1005 points (2) Andrea Henkel (GER) 972 (3) Helena Ekholm (SWE) 971
      - Mäkäräinen becomes the first Finnish woman to win the overall World Cup.
  - Men's 15 km mass start: (gold) Emil Hegle Svendsen (NOR) 39:07.6 (0+1+1+0) (silver) Evgeny Ustyugov (RUS) 39:08.0 (0+0+0+1) (bronze) Ole Einar Bjørndalen (NOR) 39:17.6 (0+1+0+0)
    - Final mass start standings: (1) Svendsen 244 points (2) Martin Fourcade (FRA) 230 (3) Tarjei Bø (NOR) 211
      - Svendsen wins his first World Cup mass start title.
    - Final overall standings: (1) Bø 1110 points (2) Svendsen 1105 (3) Fourcade 990
      - In his first full season, Bø becomes the fifth Norwegian man to win the overall World Cup.

==== Cricket ====
- World Cup (teams in **bold** advance to the quarter-finals):
  - Group A: Zimbabwe 308/6 (50 overs); Kenya 147 (36 overs) in Kolkata, India. **Zimbabwe win by 161 runs.**
    - Final standings: **Pakistan** 10 points, **Sri Lanka**, **Australia** 9, **New Zealand** 8, Zimbabwe 4, Canada 2, Kenya 0.
  - Group B: **India** 268 (49.1 overs; Yuvraj Singh 113, Ravi Rampaul 5/51); **West Indies** 188 (43 overs) in Chennai, India. **India win by 80 runs.**
    - Final standings: **South Africa** 10 points, India 9, **England** 7, West Indies, Bangladesh 6, Ireland 4, Netherlands 0.

==== Cross-country skiing ====
- World Cup Final:
  - Stage 4 in Falun, Sweden:
    - Men's 15 km freestyle handicap start: (gold) Finn Hågen Krogh (NOR) 37:06.3 (silver) Maurice Manificat (FRA) 37:29.5 (bronze) Lukáš Bauer (CZE) 37:30.5
      - Final standings: (1) Petter Northug (NOR) 1:46:32.0 (2) Krogh 1:48:17.1 (3) Dario Cologna (SUI) 1:48:17.4
      - Final World Cup overall standings: (1) Cologna 1566 points (2) Northug 1236 (3) Daniel Rickardsson (SWE) 981
        - Cologna wins his second overall title in three seasons.
    - Women's 10 km freestyle handicap start: (gold) Arianna Follis (ITA) 27:30.1 (silver) Astrid Uhrenholdt Jacobsen (NOR) 27:37.7 (bronze) Therese Johaug (NOR) 27:54.2
      - Final standings: (1) Marit Bjørgen (NOR) 1:08:48.7 (2) Justyna Kowalczyk (POL) 1:10:46.7 (3) Johaug 1:11:19.1
      - Final World Cup overall standings: (1) Kowalczyk 2073 points (2) Bjørgen 1578 (3) Follis 1310
        - Kowalczyk wins her third successive World Cup title.

==== Curling ====
- World Women's Championship in Esbjerg, Denmark:
  - Draw 4:
    - Switzerland 9–3 Czech Republic
    - South Korea 3–10 China
    - Canada 4–9 Russia
    - Scotland 7–6 United States
  - Draw 5:
    - Scotland 3–5 Sweden
    - Czech Republic 7–5 Norway
    - Germany 2–8 China
    - Denmark 8–5 Canada
      - Standings (after Draw 5): China, Czech Republic, Germany, Norway, Russia, Sweden, Switzerland 2–1; Canada, Denmark, Scotland, United States 1–2; South Korea 0–3.

==== Football (soccer) ====
- CAF Champions League First round, first leg:
  - US Bitam (Gabon) 0–0 (Nigeria) Enyimba
  - TP Mazembe (Democratic Republic of the Congo) 3–1 (Tanzania) Simba
  - Dynamos (Zimbabwe) 4–1 (Algeria) MC Alger
  - Club Africain (Tunisia) 4–2 (Egypt) Zamalek
  - AS Vita Club (Democratic Republic of the Congo) 0–1 (Cameroon) Cotonsport
  - Diaraf (Senegal) 3–0 (Mali) Djoliba
  - Al-Hilal (Sudan) 3–0 (Angola) Recreativo Caála
  - WAC Casablanca (Morocco) 2–0 (Nigeria) Kano Pillars
- CAF Confederation Cup First round, first leg:
  - Étoile du Sahel (Tunisia) 3–0 (Ghana) Ashanti Gold
  - Wits (South Africa) – (Madagascar) AS Adema — abandoned after 45 minutes due to a waterlogged pitch.
  - Kaduna United (Nigeria) 2–0 (Chad) Foullah Edifice
  - Sunshine Stars (Nigeria) 2–0 (Cameroon) Tiko United
  - JS Kabylie (Algeria) 1–0 (Mauritania) ASC Tevragh-Zeïna
  - Haras El-Hodood (Egypt) 4–0 (Ethiopia) Dedebit
- (Greece) Greek Superleague, matchday 27 (team in **bold** qualifies for the UEFA Champions League):
  - **Olympiacos** 6–0 AEK Athens
  - Panathinaikos 2–1 Kerkyra
    - Standings (after 27 matches): Olympiacos 67 points, Panathinaikos 57, AEK Athens 43.
      - Olympiacos win the title for a record-extending 38th time.
- (Scotland) Scottish League Cup Final in Glasgow:
  - **Rangers** 2–1 (a.e.t.) Celtic
    - Rangers win the Cup for a record-extending 27th time.

==== Freestyle skiing ====
- World Cup in Myrkdalen-Voss, Norway:
  - Men's dual moguls: (gold) Guilbaut Colas (FRA) 35.00 points (silver) Mikaël Kingsbury (CAN) 0.00 (bronze) Alexandre Bilodeau (CAN) 21.00
    - Final moguls standings: (1) Colas 841 points (2) Bilodeau 739 (3) Kingsbury 725
      - Colas wins his first moguls World Cup.
  - Women's dual moguls: (gold) Hannah Kearney (USA) 35.00 points (silver) Jennifer Heil (CAN) 0.00 (bronze) Justine Dufour-Lapointe (CAN) 30.00
    - Final moguls standings: (1) Kearney 1009 points (2) Heil 712 (3) Audrey Robichaud (CAN) 466
      - Kearney wins her second moguls World Cup.
- World Cup in La Plagne, France:
  - Men's halfpipe: (gold) Kevin Rolland (FRA) 46.6 points (silver) David Wise (USA) 44.2 (bronze) Justin Dorey (CAN) 43.2
    - Final halfpipe standings: (1) Benoit Valentin (FRA) 205 points (2) Xavier Bertoni (FRA) 172 (3) Wise 140
    - Final overall standings: (1) Colas 76 points (2) Andreas Matt (AUT) 75 points (3) Bilodeau 67
      - Colas wins his first overall World Cup.
  - Women's halfpipe: (gold) Sarah Burke (CAN) 46.4 points (silver) Devin Logan (USA) 44.3 (bronze) Virginie Faivre (SUI) 42.7
    - Final halfpipe standings: (1) Burke 200 points (2) Rosalind Groenewoud (CAN) 200 (3) Faivre 185
    - Final overall standings: (1) Kearney 92 points (2) Heil 65 (3) Cheng Shuang (CHN) 63
      - Kearney wins her first overall World Cup.

==== Golf ====
- PGA Tour:
  - Transitions Championship in Palm Harbor, Florida:
    - Winner: Gary Woodland (USA) 269 (−15)
      - Woodland wins his first PGA Tour title.
- European Tour:
  - Sicilian Open in Ragusa, Italy:
    - Final round suspended due to weather and darkness; to be completed on March 21.
- LPGA Tour:
  - RR Donnelley LPGA Founders Cup in Phoenix, Arizona:
    - Winner: Karrie Webb (AUS) 204 (−12)
      - Webb wins her second title of the season, and her 38th LPGA Tour title.

==== Ice hockey ====
- NCAA Division I Women's Final in Erie, Pennsylvania:
  - Wisconsin 4, Boston University 1

==== Motorcycle racing ====
- Moto GP:
  - Qatar Grand Prix in Losail, Qatar:
    - MotoGP: (1) Casey Stoner (AUS) (Honda) (2) Jorge Lorenzo (ESP) (Yamaha) (3) Dani Pedrosa (ESP) (Honda)
    - Moto2: (1) Stefan Bradl (GER) (Kalex) (2) Andrea Iannone (ITA) (Suter) (3) Thomas Lüthi (SUI) (Suter)
    - 125cc: (1) Nicolás Terol (ESP) (Aprilia) (2) Sandro Cortese (GER) (Aprilia) (3) Sergio Gadea (ESP) (Aprilia)

==== Rugby union ====
- (England) (Wales) LV= Cup Final in Northampton: **Gloucester** 34–7 Newcastle Falcons
  - Gloucester win the Cup for the first time in its current guise, and the fifth time outright.

==== Short track speed skating ====
- World Team Championships in Warsaw, Poland:
  - Women's: (gold) South Korea (Cho Ha-ri, Kim Dam-min, Park Seung-hi, Hwang Hyun-sun) 35 points (silver) China (Li Jianrou, Xiao Han, Fan Kexin, Liu Qiuhong, Zhang Hui) 34 (bronze) United States (Alyson Dudek, Katherine Reutter, Jessica Smith, Lana Gehring) 29
    - South Korea win their second consecutive world title and twelfth overall.
  - Men's: (gold) South Korea (Noh Jin-kyu, Lee Ho-suk, Kim Byeong-jun, Um Cheon-ho, Kim Cheol-min) 38 points (silver) China (Liu Xianwei, Liang Wenhao, Yang Jin, Song Weilong, Gong Qiuwen) 35 (bronze) Canada (Michael Gilday, François Hamelin, Olivier Jean, Charles Hamelin, Guillaume Blais Dufour) 28
    - South Korea win their third consecutive world title and eighth overall.

==== Ski jumping ====
- World Cup in Planica, Slovenia:
  - HS 215 (ski flying): (gold) Kamil Stoch (POL) 217.3 points (silver) Robert Kranjec (SLO) 215.0 (bronze) Adam Małysz (POL) 203.6
    - Final ski flying standings: (1) Gregor Schlierenzauer (AUT) 475 points (2) Martin Koch (AUT) 387 (3) Thomas Morgenstern (AUT) 378
      - Schlierenzauer wins the sky flying title for the second time.
    - Final overall standings: (1) Morgenstern 1757 points (2) Simon Ammann (SUI) 1364 (3) Małysz 1153
      - Morgenstern wins his second overall World Cup.

==== Snooker ====
- Players Tour Championship:
  - Finals in Dublin, Republic of Ireland:
    - Final: **Shaun Murphy** (ENG) 4–0 Martin Gould (ENG)
      - Murphy wins his fourth ranking and eleventh professional title.

==== Tennis ====
- ATP World Tour:
  - BNP Paribas Open in Indian Wells, United States:
    - Final: **Novak Djokovic** (SRB) def. Rafael Nadal (ESP) 4–6, 6–3, 6–2
      - Djokovic wins the tournament for the second time, winning his third title of the season and the 21st of his career.
- WTA Tour:
  - BNP Paribas Open in Indian Wells, United States:
    - Final: **Caroline Wozniacki** (DEN) def. Marion Bartoli (FRA) 6–1, 2–6, 6–3
      - Wozniacki wins her second title of the season, and the 14th of her career.

==== Volleyball ====
- Women's CEV Champions League Final Four in Istanbul, Turkey:
  - Third place game: (bronze) **Fenerbahçe Acıbadem** (Turkey) 3–1 (Italy) Scavolini Pesaro
  - Final: (gold) **VakıfBank Güneş TTelekom** 3–0 (silver) (Azerbaijan) Rabita Baku
    - VakıfBank Güneş TTelekom become the first side from Turkey to win the tournament.

=== March 19, 2011 (Saturday) ===
==== Alpine skiing ====
- Women's World Cup in Lenzerheide, Switzerland:
  - Giant slalom: Cancelled due to poor conditions.
    - Final giant slalom standings: (1) Viktoria Rebensburg (GER) 435 points (2) Tessa Worley (FRA) 358 (3) Tanja Poutiainen (FIN) 240
      - Rebensburg wins her first World Cup title.
    - Final overall standings: (1) Maria Riesch (GER) 1728 points (2) Lindsey Vonn (USA) 1725 (3) Tina Maze (SLO) 1139
      - Riesch becomes the first German woman to win the overall title since Katja Seizinger in 1998.
- Men's World Cup in Lenzerheide, Switzerland:
  - Slalom: (gold) Giuliano Razzoli (ITA) 1:25.72 (41.99 / 43.73) (silver) Mario Matt (AUT) 1:25.75 (41.27 / 44.48) (bronze) Felix Neureuther (GER) 1:25.97 (41.46 / 44.51)
    - Final slalom standings: (1) Ivica Kostelić (CRO) 478 points (2) Jean-Baptiste Grange (FRA) 442 (3) André Myhrer (SWE) 423
      - Kostelić wins his first slalom title since 2002.
    - Final overall standings: (1) Kostelić 1356 points (2) Didier Cuche (SUI) 956 (3) Carlo Janka (SUI) 793
      - Kostelić becomes the first Croatian man to win the overall World Cup title, and the second Croatian ever, after sister Janica.

==== Athletics ====
- European Cup Winter Throwing in Sofia, Bulgaria, day 1:
  - Discus throw men: (gold) Ercüment Olgundeniz (TUR) 63.31 m (silver) Erik Cadée (NED) 62.15 m (bronze) Sergiu Ursu (ROU) 62.00 m
  - Hammer throw men: (gold) Krisztián Pars (HUN) 79.84 m (silver) Yury Shayunou (BLR) 77.41 m (bronze) Oleksiy Sokyrskyy (UKR) 76.84 m
  - Javelin throw women: (gold) Hanna Hatsko (UKR) 58.35 m (silver) Esther Eisenlauer (GER) 56.99 m (bronze) Ásdís Hjálmsdóttir (ISL) 56.44 m
  - Shot put women: (gold) Alena Kopets (BLR) 17.71 m (silver) Jessica Cérival (FRA) 17.52 m (bronze) Chiara Rosa (ITA) 17.39 m

==== Auto racing ====
- Intercontinental Le Mans Cup:
  - 12 Hours of Sebring in Sebring, Florida: (1) (France) #10 Team Oreca-Matmut (Nicolas Lapierre (FRA), Loïc Duval (FRA), Olivier Panis (FRA)) (2) (United States) #01 Highcroft Racing (David Brabham (AUS), Marino Franchitti (GBR), Simon Pagenaud (FRA)) (3) (France) #8 Peugeot Sport Total (Pedro Lamy (POR), Franck Montagny (FRA), Stéphane Sarrazin (FRA))
- Nationwide Series:
  - Scotts EZ Seed 300 in Bristol, Tennessee: (1) (Nevada) Kyle Busch (Toyota; Joe Gibbs Racing) (2) (Washington (state)) Kasey Kahne (Chevrolet; Turner Motorsports) (3) (North Carolina) Dale Earnhardt Jr. (Chevrolet; JR Motorsports)
    - Drivers' championship standings (after 4 of 34 races): (1) (California) Jason Leffler (Chevrolet; Turner Motorsports) 142 points (2) (Mississippi) Ricky Stenhouse Jr. (Ford; Roush Fenway Racing) 140 (3) (Illinois) Justin Allgaier (Chevrolet; Turner Motorsports) 124
- V8 Supercars:
  - Clipsal 500 in Adelaide, South Australia:
    - Race 3: (1) Garth Tander (AUS) (Holden Racing Team, Holden VE Commodore) (2) Jamie Whincup (AUS) (Triple Eight Race Engineering, Holden VE Commodore) (3) Craig Lowndes (AUS) (Triple Eight Race Engineering, Holden VE Commodore)
      - Drivers' championship standings (after 3 of 27 races): (1) Whincup 417 points (2) Mark Winterbottom (AUS) (Ford Performance Racing, Ford FG Falcon) 294 (3) Shane van Gisbergen (NZL) (Stone Brothers Racing, Ford FG Falcon) 276

==== Basketball ====
- NCAA Division I Men's Tournament (seeds in parentheses):
  - East Regional, third round:
    - In Tampa, Florida: (4) Kentucky 71, (5) West Virginia 63
  - Southeast Regional, third round:
    - In Tampa, Florida: (2) Florida 73, (7) UCLA 65
    - In Washington, D.C.: (8) Butler 71, (1) Pittsburgh 70
    - In Denver, Colorado: (3) BYU 89, (11) Gonzaga 67
    - In Tucson, Arizona: (4) Wisconsin 70, (5) Kansas State 65
  - Southwest Regional, third round:
    - In Denver, Colorado: (12) Richmond 65, (13) Morehead State 48
  - West Regional, third round:
    - In Tucson, Arizona: (2) San Diego State 71, (7) Temple 64 (2OT)
    - In Washington, D.C.: (3) Connecticut 69, (6) Cincinnati 58
- Women's Division I Tournament (seeds in parentheses):
  - Dayton Regional, first round:
    - In Knoxville, Tennessee:
      - (1) Tennessee 99, (16) Stetson 34
      - (8) Marquette 68, (9) Texas 65
    - In Columbus, Ohio:
      - (5) Georgia Tech 69, (12) Bowling Green 58
      - (4) Ohio State 80, (13) UCF 69
    - In Salt Lake City, Utah:
      - (10) Temple 63, (7) Arizona State 45
      - (2) Notre Dame 67, (15) Utah 54
  - Philadelphia Regional, first round:
    - In University Park, Pennsylvania:
      - (6) Penn State 75, (11) Dayton 66
      - (3) DePaul 56, (14) Navy 43
    - In Durham, North Carolina:
      - (10) Marist 74, (7) Iowa State 64
      - (2) Duke 90, (15) Tennessee–Martin 45
  - Spokane Regional, first round:
    - In Spokane, Washington:
      - (11) Gonzaga 92, (6) Iowa 86
      - (3) UCLA 55, (14) Montana 47
    - In Albuquerque, New Mexico:
      - (5) North Carolina 82, (12) Fresno State 68
      - (4) Kentucky 66, (13) Hampton 62 (OT)
    - In Stanford, California:
      - (9) St. John's 55, (8) Texas Tech 50
      - (1) Stanford 86, (16) UC Davis 59

==== Biathlon ====
- World Cup 9 in Holmenkollen, Norway:
  - Women's 10 km pursuit: (gold) Anastasiya Kuzmina (SVK) 33:42.5 (0+2+1+0) (silver) Darya Domracheva (BLR) 34:05.6 (2+0+1+2) (bronze) Andrea Henkel (GER) 34:10.1 (0+0+1+2)
    - Final pursuit standings: (1) Kaisa Mäkäräinen (FIN) 343 points (2) Henkel 303 (3) Helena Ekholm (SWE) 279
      - Mäkäräinen wins her first World Cup discipline title.
    - Overall standings (after 25 of 26 races): (1) Mäkäräinen 979 points (2) Tora Berger (NOR) 938 (3) Ekholm 935
  - Men's 12.5 km pursuit: (gold) Emil Hegle Svendsen (NOR) 32:59.2 (0+2+1+0) (silver) Tarjei Bø (NOR) 32:59.8 (0+0+1+0) (bronze) Martin Fourcade (FRA) 33:06.5 (1+0+0+0)
    - Final pursuit standings: (1) Bø 334 points (2) Fourcade 320 (3) Svendsen 304
      - Bø wins his first pursuit World Cup, and his second discipline title.
    - Overall standings (after 25 of 26 races): (1) Bø 1076 points (2) Svendsen 1045 (3) Fourcade 954

==== Cricket ====
- World Cup (teams in **bold** advance to the quarter-finals):
  - Group A: **Australia** 176 (46.4 overs); **Pakistan** 178/6 (41 overs) in Colombo, Sri Lanka. **Pakistan win by 4 wickets.**
    - Australia lose a World Cup match for the first time since losing to Pakistan in 1999, ending a 34-match unbeaten run.
    - Standings: Pakistan 10 points (6 matches), **Sri Lanka**, Australia 9 (6), **New Zealand** 8 (6), Zimbabwe 2 (5), Canada 2 (6), Kenya 0 (5).
  - Group B: **South Africa** 284/8 (50 overs); Bangladesh 78 (28 overs) in Dhaka, Bangladesh. **South Africa win by 206 runs.**
    - Standings: South Africa 10 points (6 matches), **India** 7 (5), **England** 7 (6), **West Indies** 6 (5), Bangladesh 6 (6), Ireland 4 (6), Netherlands 0 (6).

==== Cross-country skiing ====
- World Cup Final:
  - Stage 3 in Falun, Sweden:
    - Men's 20 km pursuit: (gold) Petter Northug (NOR) 57:32.2 (silver) Giorgio Di Centa (ITA) 57:34.8 (bronze) Daniel Rickardsson (SWE) 57:42.4
      - World Cup final standings: (1) Northug 1:08:42.4 (2) Emil Jönsson (SWE) 1:10:10.0 (3) Rickardsson 1:10:19.6
      - Final World Cup distance standings: (1) Dario Cologna (SUI) 706 points (2) Rickardsson 568 (3) Lukáš Bauer (CZE) 553
      - World Cup overall standings (after 30 of 31 races): (1) Cologna 1446 points (2) Northug 1036 (3) Rickardsson 901
    - Women's 10 km pursuit: (gold) Marit Bjørgen (NOR) 31:14.4 (silver) Justyna Kowalczyk (POL) 31:39.5 (bronze) Therese Johaug (NOR) 31:48.3
      - World Cup final standings: (1) Bjørgen 40:50.7 (2) Kowalczyk 42:04.6 (3) Johaug 43:24.9
      - Final World Cup distance standings: (1) Kowalczyk 1039 points (2) Bjørgen 775 (3) Johaug 671
      - World Cup overall standings (after 30 of 31 races): (1) Kowalczyk 1913 points (2) Bjørgen 1378 (3) Arianna Follis (ITA) 1210

==== Curling ====
- World Women's Championship in Esbjerg, Denmark:
  - Draw 2:
    - China 6–8 Canada
    - United States 3–5 Switzerland
    - Scotland 5–6 Czech Republic
    - Russia 9–5 South Korea
  - Draw 3:
    - South Korea 2–5 Norway
    - Sweden 8–4 Russia
    - Denmark 6–7 United States
    - Germany 10–7 Switzerland
      - Standings (after Draw 3): Germany, Norway 2–0; Canada, Czech Republic 1–0; Russia, Sweden, Switzerland, United States 1–1; China, Scotland 0–1; Denmark, South Korea 0–2.

==== Cycling ====
- UCI World Tour:
  - Milan–San Remo: (gold) Matthew Goss (AUS) (HTC–Highroad) 6h 51' 10" (silver) Fabian Cancellara (SUI) (Leopard Trek) s.t. (bronze) Philippe Gilbert (BEL) (Omega Pharma–Lotto) s.t.
    - World Tour standings (after 4 of 27 races): (1) Goss 203 points (2) Michele Scarponi (ITA) (Lampre–ISD) 118 (3) Cadel Evans (AUS) (BMC Racing Team) & Tony Martin (GER) (HTC–Highroad) 108

==== Equestrianism ====
- Show jumping:
  - Global Champions Tour:
    - 1st competition in Doha (CSI 5*): (gold) Alvaro de Miranda Neto (BRA) on Ashleigh Drossel Dan (silver) Pius Schwizer (SUI) on Carlina (bronze) Meredith Michaels-Beerbaum (GER) on Shutterfly

==== Football (soccer) ====
- South American Under-17 Championship in Ecuador:
  - Group B:
    - Chile 2–1 Venezuela
    - Brazil 1–2 Paraguay
      - Standings: Brazil 6 points (3 matches), Colombia 4 (2), Chile 4 (3), Paraguay 3 (2), Venezuela 0 (2).
- CAF Champions League First round, first leg:
  - Ittihad (Libya) – (Ivory Coast) JC Abidjan — cancelled due to the 2011 Libyan civil war
  - ZESCO United (Zambia) 5–0 (Eswatini) Young Buffaloes
  - Motor Action (Zimbabwe) 0–0 (2–4 pen.) (Ivory Coast) **ASEC Mimosas**
  - Espérance ST (Tunisia) 5–0 (Benin) ASPAC
  - Stade Malien (Mali) 2–1 (Morocco) Raja Casablanca
  - Al-Merreikh (Sudan) 2–0 (Angola) Inter Luanda
  - ES Sétif (Algeria) 2–0 (Burkina Faso) ASFA Yennenga
- CAF Confederation Cup First round, first leg:
  - Victors (Uganda) 1–1 (Democratic Republic of the Congo) Motema Pembe
  - FUS de Rabat (Morocco) 2–0 (Senegal) Touré Kunda Footpro
  - 1º de Agosto (Angola) 2–0 (Republic of the Congo) AC Léopard
  - MAS Fez (Morocco) 0–0 (Niger) Sahel SC
- OFC Champions League Group stage, matchday 6 (teams in **bold** advance to the final):
  - Group A:
    - Koloale (Solomon Islands) 1–0 (Vanuatu) **Amicale**
    - PRK Hekari United (Papua New Guinea) 1–1 (Fiji) Lautoka
      - Final standings: Amicale 10 points, Koloale 9, Lautoka 8, PRK Hekari United 6.
  - Group B:
    - Waitakere United (New Zealand) 2–1 (New Caledonia) AS Magenta
    - **Auckland City** (New Zealand) 5–0 (French Polynesia) AS Tefana
      - Final standings: Auckland City 14 points, Waitakere United 8, AS Magenta 7, AS Tefana 4.
- (Sweden) Swedish Super Cup in Malmö:
  - Malmö FF 1–2 **Helsingborgs IF**

==== Freestyle skiing ====
- World Cup in Myrkdalen-Voss, Norway:
  - Men's ski cross: (gold) Christopher Del Bosco (CAN) (silver) Conradign Netzer (SUI) (bronze) Tomáš Kraus (CZE)
    - Final ski cross standings: (1) Andreas Matt (AUT) 824 points (2) Del Bosco 615 (3) Jouni Pellinen (FIN) 462
    - Overall standings: (1) Matt 75 points (2) Guilbaut Colas (FRA) 74 (3) Alexandre Bilodeau (CAN) 68
  - Women's ski cross: (gold) Anna Holmlund (SWE) (silver) Kelsey Serwa (CAN) (bronze) Katrin Müller (SUI)
    - Final ski cross standings: (1) Holmlund 672 points (2) Heidi Zacher (GER) 612 (3) Serwa 610
    - Overall standings: (1) Hannah Kearney (USA) 91 points (2) Jennifer Heil (CAN) & Cheng Shuang (CHN) 63

==== Mixed martial arts ====
- UFC 128 in Newark, New Jersey, United States:
  - Light heavyweight championship bout: **Jon Jones** (USA) def. Maurício Rua (c) (BRA) via TKO (strikes)
  - Bantamweight bout: **Urijah Faber** (USA) def. Eddie Wineland (USA) via unanimous decision (29–28, 29–28, 29–28)
  - Middleweight bout: **Nate Marquardt** (USA) def. Dan Miller (USA) via unanimous decision (30–27, 30–27, 30–27)
  - Heavyweight bout: **Brendan Schaub** (USA) def. Mirko Filipović (CRO) via TKO (punch)
  - Lightweight bout: **Jim Miller** (USA) def. Kamal Shalorus (IRN) via TKO (punches)

==== Rugby union ====
- Six Nations Championship, Week 5:
  - Scotland 21–8 Italy in Edinburgh
  - Ireland 24–8 England in Dublin
    - In Ireland's victory, Brian O'Driscoll takes sole possession of the all-time record for career tries in the Championship with 25, and Ronan O'Gara equals the record of countryman Mike Gibson for appearances in the Championship with 56.
  - France 28–9 Wales in Saint-Denis
    - Final standings: England 8 points, France, Ireland, Wales 6, Scotland, Italy 2.
      - England win the Championship for the first time since 2003, and for the 26th time outright.
- European Nations Cup First Division, week 5:
  - Russia 9–15 Georgia in Sochi
  - Romania 64–8 Spain in Bucharest
  - Portugal 46–24 Ukraine in Lisbon
    - Standings: Georgia 22 points (5 matches), Portugal 14 (5), Romania 11 (4), Russia 11 (5), Spain 10 (5), Ukraine 0 (4).

==== Ski jumping ====
- World Cup in Planica, Slovenia:
  - HS 215 Team (ski flying): (gold) Austria (Thomas Morgenstern, Andreas Kofler, Martin Koch, Gregor Schlierenzauer) 1669.9 points (silver) Norway (Anders Bardal, Johan Remen Evensen, Bjørn Einar Romøren, Tom Hilde) 1534.4 (bronze) Slovenia (Peter Prevc, Jernej Damjan, Jurij Tepeš, Robert Kranjec) 1488.6

==== Snowboarding ====
- World Cup in Valmalenco, Italy:
  - Men's parallel giant slalom: (gold) Sylvain Dufour (FRA) (silver) Andreas Prommegger (AUT) (bronze) Roland Haldi (SUI)
    - Parallel slalom standings (after 9 of 10 races): (1) Benjamin Karl (AUT) 5500 points (2) Prommegger 4740 (3) Roland Fischnaller (ITA) 4620
    - Overall standings: (1) Karl 5500 points (2) Prommegger 4740 (3) Fischnaller 4620
  - Women's parallel giant slalom: (gold) Yekaterina Tudegesheva (RUS) (silver) Isabella Laböck (GER) (bronze) Julia Dujmovits (AUT)
    - Parallel slalom standings (after 9 of 10 races): (1) Tudegesheva 6890 points (2) Fränzi Mägert-Kohli (SUI) 4770 (3) Marion Kreiner (AUT) 4090
    - Overall standings: (1) Tudegesheva 6890 points (2) Mägert-Kohli 4770 (3) Dominique Maltais (CAN) 4300

==== Volleyball ====
- Women's CEV Champions League Final Four in Istanbul, Turkey:
  - **Rabita Baku** (Azerbaijan) 3–1 (Italy) Scavolini Pesaro
  - Fenerbahçe Acıbadem (Turkey) 2–3 (Turkey) **VakıfBank Güneş TTelekom**

=== March 18, 2011 (Friday) ===
==== Alpine skiing ====
- Women's World Cup in Lenzerheide, Switzerland:
  - Slalom: (gold) Tina Maze (SLO) 1:29.33 (44.08 / 45.25) (silver) Marlies Schild (AUT) 1:29.38 (43.38 / 46.00) (bronze) Veronika Zuzulová (SVK) 1:29.97 (44.92 / 45.05)
    - Final slalom standings: (1) Schild 680 points (2) Tanja Poutiainen (FIN) 511 (3) Maria Riesch (GER) 470
      - Schild wins her third slalom World Cup title.
    - Overall standings (after 33 of 34 races): (1) Riesch 1728 points (2) Lindsey Vonn (USA) 1725 (3) Maze 1139
- Men's World Cup in Lenzerheide, Switzerland:
  - Giant slalom: Cancelled due to poor conditions.
    - Final giant slalom standings: (1) Ted Ligety (USA) 383 points (2) Aksel Lund Svindal (NOR) 306 (3) Cyprien Richard (FRA) 303
      - Ligety wins his third giant slalom World Cup in four years.
    - Overall standings (after 35 of 36 races): (1) Ivica Kostelić (CRO) 1356 points (2) Didier Cuche (SUI) 956 (3) Carlo Janka (SUI) 793

==== Basketball ====
- NCAA Division I Men's Tournament (seeds in parentheses):
  - East Regional, second round:
    - In Cleveland:
      - (8) George Mason 61, (9) Villanova 57
      - (1) Ohio State 75, (16) Texas–San Antonio 46
      - (11) Marquette 66, (6) Xavier 55
      - (3) Syracuse 77, (14) Indiana State 60
    - In Charlotte, North Carolina:
      - (2) North Carolina 102, (15) Long Island 87
      - (7) Washington 68, (10) Georgia 65
  - Southwest Regional, second round:
    - In Chicago:
      - (2) Notre Dame 69, (15) Akron 56
      - (10) Florida State 57, (7) Texas A&M 50
      - (3) Purdue 65, (14) St. Peter's 43
      - (11) VCU 74, (6) Georgetown 56
    - In Tulsa, Oklahoma:
      - (1) Kansas 72, (16) Boston University 53
      - (9) Illinois 73, (8) UNLV 62
  - West Regional, second round:
    - In Tulsa, Oklahoma:
      - (4) Texas 85, (13) Oakland 81
      - (5) Arizona 77, (12) Memphis 75
    - In Charlotte, North Carolina:
      - (8) Michigan 75, (9) Tennessee 45
      - (1) Duke 87, (16) Hampton 45

==== Cricket ====
- World Cup (teams in **bold** advance to the quarter-finals):
  - Group A: **Sri Lanka** 265/9 (50 overs; Kumar Sangakkara 111); **New Zealand** 153 (35 overs) in Mumbai, India. **Sri Lanka win by 112 runs.**
    - Standings: Sri Lanka 9 points (6 matches), **Australia** 9 (5), New Zealand 8 (6), **Pakistan** 8 (5), Zimbabwe 2 (5), Canada 2 (6), Kenya 0 (5).
  - Group B: Netherlands 306 (50 overs; Ryan ten Doeschate 106); Ireland 307/4 (47.4 overs; Paul Stirling 101) in Kolkata, India. **Ireland win by 6 wickets.**
    - Standings: **South Africa** 8 points (5 matches), India 7 (5), England 7 (6), West Indies, Bangladesh 6 (5), Ireland 4 (6), Netherlands 0 (6).

==== Cross-country skiing ====
- World Cup Final:
  - Stage 2 in Falun, Sweden:
    - Men's 3.3 km classical individual: (gold) Ilia Chernousov (RUS) 10:51.8 (silver) Petter Northug (NOR) 10:54.7 (bronze) Maxim Vylegzhanin (RUS) 10:56.0
      - World Cup final standings: (1) Northug 12:00.2 (2) Emil Jönsson (SWE) 12:16.4 (3) Jesper Modin (SWE) 12:32.5
      - World Cup distance standings (after 16 of 17 races): (1) Dario Cologna (SUI) 666 points (2) Daniel Rickardsson (SWE) 525 (3) Lukáš Bauer (CZE) 519
      - World Cup overall standings (after 29 of 31 races): (1) Cologna 1406 points (2) Northug 986 (3) Rickardsson 858
    - Women's 2.5 km classical individual: (gold) Marit Bjørgen (NOR) 9:01.6 (silver) Justyna Kowalczyk (POL) 9:12.2 (bronze) Therese Johaug (NOR) 9:14.5
      - World Cup final standings: (1) Bjørgen 10:21.3 (2) Kowalczyk 10:55.1 (3) Petra Majdič (SLO) 11:08.3
      - World Cup distance standings (after 16 of 17 races): (1) Kowalczyk 993 points (2) Bjørgen 725 (3) Johaug 628
      - World Cup overall standings (after 29 of 31 races): (1) Kowalczyk 1867 points (2) Bjørgen 1328 (3) Arianna Follis (ITA) 1173

==== Curling ====
- World Women's Championship in Esbjerg, Denmark:
  - Draw 1:
    - Denmark 3–8 Germany
    - Norway 8–7 Sweden

==== Football (soccer) ====
- South American Under-17 Championship in Ecuador:
  - Group A:
    - Argentina 1–2 Uruguay
    - Peru 2–4 Bolivia
      - Standings: Uruguay 6 points (2 matches), Ecuador 4 (2), Argentina 3 (2), Bolivia 3 (3), Peru 1 (3).
- CAF Champions League First round, first leg:
  - Al-Ahly (Egypt) 2–0 (South Africa) SuperSport United
- CAF Confederation Cup First round, first leg:
  - Olympique Béja (Tunisia) 2–0 (Morocco) Difaa El Jadida
  - Victors (Uganda) – (Democratic Republic of the Congo) Motema Pembe — postponed due to a waterlogged pitch
  - Saint Eloi Lupopo (Democratic Republic of the Congo) 1–0 (Zambia) Nchanga Rangers
  - Ismaily (Egypt) 2–0 (Kenya) Sofapaka
  - Al-Nil Al-Hasahesa (Sudan) 1–1 (Gabon) Missile

==== Ice hockey ====
- NCAA Division I Women's Frozen Four in Erie, Pennsylvania:
  - Wisconsin 3, Boston College 2
  - Boston University 4, Cornell 1

==== Ski jumping ====
- World Cup in Planica, Slovenia:
  - HS 215 (ski flying): (gold) Gregor Schlierenzauer (AUT) 450.9 points (silver) Thomas Morgenstern (AUT) 448.1 (bronze) Martin Koch (AUT) 433.8
    - Ski flying standings (after 6 of 7 events): (1) Schlierenzauer 425 points (2) Koch 361 (3) Morgenstern 342
    - Overall standings (after 25 of 26 events): (1) Morgenstern 1721 points (2) Simon Ammann (SUI) 1349 (3) Andreas Kofler (AUT) 1120

==== Snowboarding ====
- World Cup in Valmalenco, Italy:
  - Men's snowboard cross: (gold) Alberto Schiavon (ITA) (silver) Jonathan Cheever (USA) (bronze) Nate Holland (USA)
    - Snowboard cross standings (after 5 of 7 races): (1) Cheever 2490 points (2) Pierre Vaultier (FRA) 2090 (3) Holland 1860
    - Overall standings: (1) Benjamin Karl (AUT) 5210 points (2) Roland Fischnaller (ITA) 4400 (3) Andreas Prommegger (AUT) 3940
  - Women's snowboard cross: (gold) Lindsey Jacobellis (USA) (silver) Eva Samkova (CZE) (bronze) Déborah Anthonioz (FRA)
    - Snowboard cross standings (after 5 of 7 races): (1) Dominique Maltais (CAN) 4300 points (2) Jacobellis 2450 (3) Anthonioz 2360
    - Overall standings: (1) Yekaterina Tudegesheva (RUS) 5890 points (2) Fränzi Mägert-Kohli (SUI) 4410 (3) Maltais 4300

=== March 17, 2011 (Thursday) ===
==== Alpine skiing ====
- Men's World Cup in Lenzerheide, Switzerland:
  - Super-G: Cancelled due to rain.
    - Final Super-G standings: (1) Didier Cuche (SUI) 291 points (2) Georg Streitberger (AUT) 227 (3) Ivica Kostelić (CRO) 223
      - Cuche wins his first Super-G World Cup, and his sixth world title overall.
    - Overall standings (after 35 of 37 races): (1) Kostelić 1356 points (2) Cuche 956 (3) Carlo Janka (SUI) 793
- Women's World Cup in Lenzerheide, Switzerland:
  - Super-G: Cancelled due to rain.
    - Final Super-G standings: (1) Lindsey Vonn (USA) 560 points (2) Maria Riesch (GER) 389 (3) Julia Mancuso (USA) 315
      - Vonn wins her third consecutive Super-G World Cup title.
    - Overall standings (after 32 of 34 races): (1) Vonn 1705 points (2) Riesch 1678 (3) Tina Maze (SLO) 1039

==== Basketball ====
- NCAA Division I Men's Tournament (seeds in parentheses):
  - East Regional, second round:
    - In Tampa, Florida:
      - (5) West Virginia 84, (12) Clemson 76
      - (4) Kentucky 59, (13) Princeton 57
  - Southeast Regional, second round:
    - In Washington, D.C.:
      - (8) Butler 60, (9) Old Dominion 58
      - (1) Pittsburgh 74, (16) UNC Asheville 51
    - In Tampa, Florida:
      - (2) Florida 79, (15) UC–Santa Barbara 51
      - (7) UCLA 78, (10) Michigan State 76
    - In Denver, Colorado:
      - (3) BYU 74, (14) Wofford 66
      - (11) Gonzaga 86, (6) St. John's 71
    - In Tucson, Arizona:
      - (4) Wisconsin 72, (13) Belmont 58
      - (5) Kansas State 73, (12) Utah State 68
  - Southwest Regional, second round:
    - In Denver, Colorado:
      - (13) Morehead State 62, (4) Louisville 61
      - (12) Richmond 69, (5) Vanderbilt 66
  - West Regional, second round:
    - In Tucson, Arizona:
      - (7) Temple 66, (10) Penn State 64
      - (2) San Diego State 68, (15) Northern Colorado 50
    - In Washington, D.C.:
      - (3) Connecticut 81, (14) Bucknell 52
      - (6) Cincinnati 78, (11) Missouri 63
- EuroCup Women Final, first leg:
  - Elitzur Ramla (Israel) 61–61 (France) ASPTT Arras

==== Biathlon ====
- World Cup 9 in Holmenkollen, Norway:
  - Women's 7.5 km Sprint: (gold) Magdalena Neuner (GER) 21:04.6 (0+1) (silver) Tora Berger (NOR) 21:35.9 (0+1) (bronze) Darya Domracheva (BLR) 21:50.7 (0+2)
    - Final sprint standings: (1) Neuner 404 points (2) Kaisa Mäkäräinen (FIN) 391 (3) Berger 356
      - Neuner wins her second sprint World Cup, and her seventh discipline title.
    - Overall standings (after 24 of 26 races): (1) Mäkäräinen 936 points (2) Neuner 914 (3) Helena Ekholm (SWE) 911
  - Men's 10 km Sprint: (gold) Andreas Birnbacher (GER) 26:14.6 (0+0) (silver) Björn Ferry (SWE) 26:24.8 (0+0) (bronze) Alexander Wolf (GER) 26:58.6 (0+0)
    - Final sprint standings: (1) Tarjei Bø (NOR) 393 points (2) Emil Hegle Svendsen (NOR) 369 (3) Arnd Peiffer (GER) 333
      - Bø wins his first World Cup discipline title.
    - Overall standings (after 24 of 26 races): (1) Bø 1022 points (2) Svendsen 985 (3) Martin Fourcade (FRA) 906

==== Cricket ====
- World Cup (team in **bold** advances to the quarter-finals):
  - Group B: England 243 (48.4 overs); West Indies 225 (44.4 overs) in Chennai, India. **England win by 18 runs.**
    - Standings: **South Africa** 8 points (5 matches), India 7 (5), England 7 (6), West Indies, Bangladesh 6 (5), Ireland 2 (5), Netherlands 0 (5).

==== Darts ====
- Premier League, week 6 in Glasgow, Scotland:
  - Terry Jenkins (ENG) 6–8 James Wade (ENG)
  - Raymond van Barneveld (NED) 8–4 Mark Webster (WAL)
  - Simon Whitlock (AUS) 5–8 Phil Taylor (ENG)
  - Gary Anderson (SCO) 3–8 Adrian Lewis (ENG)
    - Standings (after 6 matches): Taylor 10 points, Anderson, van Barneveld 8, Lewis 6, Whitlock, Webster, Jenkins, Wade 4.

==== Football (soccer) ====
- UEFA Europa League Round of 16, second leg (first leg scores in parentheses):
  - Paris Saint-Germain (France) 1–1 (1–2) (Portugal) **Benfica**. Benfica win 3–2 on aggregate.
  - Manchester City (England) 1–0 (0–2) (Ukraine) **Dynamo Kyiv**. Dynamo Kyiv win 2–1 on aggregate.
  - Zenit St. Petersburg (Russia) 2–0 (0–3) (Netherlands) **Twente**. Twente win 3–2 on aggregate.
  - **Spartak Moscow** (Russia) 3–0 (1–0) (Netherlands) Ajax. Spartak Moscow win 4–0 on aggregate.
  - **Porto** (Portugal) 2–1 (1–0) (Russia) CSKA Moscow. Porto win 3–1 on aggregate.
  - Rangers (Scotland) 0–1 (0–0) (Netherlands) **PSV Eindhoven**. PSV Eindhoven win 1–0 on aggregate.
  - **Villarreal** (Spain) 2–1 (3–2) (Germany) Bayer Leverkusen. Villarreal win 5–3 on aggregate.
  - Liverpool (England) 0–0 (0–1) (Portugal) **Braga**. Braga win 1–0 on aggregate.
- UEFA Women's Champions League quarter-finals, first leg:
  - Zvezda 2005 Perm (Russia) 0–0 (France) Lyon
  - Arsenal (England) 1–1 (Sweden) Linköpings
  - Everton (England) 1–3 (Germany) Duisburg
- Copa Libertadores second stage (team in **bold** advances to the knockout stage):
  - Group 2:
    - León de Huánuco (Peru) 1–1 (Brazil) Grêmio
    - **Junior** (Colombia) 2–1 (Bolivia) Oriente Petrolero
      - Standings (after 4 matches): Junior 12 points, Grêmio 7, León de Huánuco 4, Oriente Petrolero 0.
  - Group 7: Estudiantes (Argentina) 5–1 (Paraguay) Guaraní
    - Standings (after 4 matches): (Brazil) Cruzeiro 10 points, Estudiantes 9, (Colombia) Deportes Tolima 4, Guaraní 0.
  - Group 8: LDU Quito (Ecuador) 5–0 (Uruguay) Peñarol
    - Standings: LDU Quito 6 points (4 matches), (Argentina) Godoy Cruz 6 (3), Peñarol 6 (4), (Argentina) Independiente 3 (3).

=== March 16, 2011 (Wednesday) ===
==== Alpine skiing ====
- Men's World Cup in Lenzerheide, Switzerland:
  - Downhill: (gold) Adrien Théaux (FRA) 1:22.94 (silver) Joachim Puchner (AUT) 1:22.95 (bronze) Aksel Lund Svindal (NOR) 1:23.10
    - Final downhill standings: (1) Didier Cuche (SUI) 510 points (2) Michael Walchhofer (AUT) 498 (3) Klaus Kröll (AUT) 411
      - Cuche wins his fourth downhill World Cup in five seasons.
    - Overall standings (after 35 of 38 races): (1) Ivica Kostelić (CRO) 1356 points (2) Cuche 956 (3) Carlo Janka (SUI) 793
- Women's World Cup in Lenzerheide, Switzerland:
  - Downhill: (gold) Julia Mancuso (USA) 1:27.50 (silver) Lara Gut (SUI) 1:28.31 (bronze) Elisabeth Görgl (AUT) 1:28.65
    - Final downhill standings: (1) Lindsey Vonn (USA) 650 points (2) Maria Riesch (GER) 457 (3) Mancuso 367
      - Vonn wins her fourth consecutive downhill World Cup title.
    - Overall standings (after 32 of 35 races): (1) Vonn 1705 points (2) Riesch 1678 (3) Tina Maze (SLO) 1039

==== Basketball ====
- NCAA Division I Men's Tournament:
  - First Four in Dayton, Ohio:
    - Texas–San Antonio 70, Alabama State 61
    - VCU 59, Southern California 46
- (Russia) Russian Cup Final:
  - **BC Spartak Saint Petersburg** 80–53 BC Nizhny Novgorod
    - Spartak win the Cup for the third time.

==== Cricket ====
- World Cup (teams in **bold** advance to the quarter-finals):
  - Group A: Canada 211 (45.4 overs); **Australia** 212/3 (34.5 overs) in Bangalore, India. **Australia win by 7 wickets.**
    - Standings: Australia 9 points (5 matches), **New Zealand**, **Pakistan** 8 (5), **Sri Lanka** 7 (5), Zimbabwe 2 (5), Canada 2 (6), Kenya 0 (5).

==== Cross-country skiing ====
- World Cup Final:
  - Stage 1 in Stockholm, Sweden:
    - Men's sprint classical: (gold) Emil Jönsson (SWE) 2:12.4 (silver) Petter Northug (NOR) 2:15.5 (bronze) Ola Vigen Hattestad (NOR) 2:15.7
      - Final sprint standings: (1) Jönsson 580 points (2) Hattestad 407 (3) Jesper Modin (SWE) 300
        - Jönsson wins his second consecutive sprint World Cup.
      - Overall standings (after 28 of 31 races): (1) Dario Cologna (SUI) 1391 points (2) Northug 940 (3) Daniel Rickardsson (SWE) 834
    - Women's sprint classical: (gold) Petra Majdič (SLO) 2:28.4 (silver) Marit Bjørgen (NOR) 2:31.2 (bronze) Maiken Caspersen Falla (NOR) 2:32.4
      - Final sprint standings: (1) Majdič 480 points (2) Arianna Follis (ITA) 434 (3) Kikkan Randall (USA) 427
        - Majdič wins the sprint title for the third time in four seasons.
      - Overall standings (after 28 of 31 races): (1) Justyna Kowalczyk (POL) 1821 points (2) Bjørgen 1278 (3) Follis 1136

==== Football (soccer) ====
- South American Under-17 Championship in Ecuador:
  - Group B:
    - Brazil 2–1 Chile
    - Colombia 3–1 Paraguay
      - Standings: Brazil 6 points (2 matches), Colombia 4 (2), Chile 1 (2), Venezuela, Paraguay 0 (1).
- UEFA Champions League Round of 16, second leg (first leg score in parentheses):
  - **Chelsea** (England) 0–0 (2–0) (Denmark) Copenhagen. Chelsea win 2–0 on aggregate.
  - **Real Madrid** (Spain) 3–0 (1–1) (France) Lyon. Real Madrid win 4–1 on aggregate.
- Copa Libertadores second stage:
  - Group 5: Colo-Colo (Chile) 3–2 (Brazil) Santos
    - Standings (after 3 matches): Colo-Colo 6 points, (Paraguay) Cerro Porteño 5, Santos, (Venezuela) Deportivo Táchira 2.
  - Group 6:
    - Jorge Wilstermann (Bolivia) 1–4 (Brazil) Internacional
    - Emelec (Ecuador) 1–0 (Mexico) Chiapas
      - Standings: Internacional 7 points (3 matches), Emelec 7 (4), Jaguares 6 (4), Jorge Wilstermann 0 (3).
  - Group 7: Cruzeiro (Brazil) 6–1 (Colombia) Deportes Tolima
    - Standings: Cruzeiro 10 points (4 matches), (Argentina) Estudiantes 6 (3), Deportes Tolima 4 (4), (Paraguay) Guaraní 0 (3).
- AFC Champions League group stage, matchday 2:
  - Group B: Al-Sadd (Qatar) 2–1 (Uzbekistan) Pakhtakor
    - Standings (after 2 matches): (Saudi Arabia) Al-Nassr, Al-Sadd 4 points, Pakhtakor, (Iran) Esteghlal 1.
  - Group C:
    - Bunyodkor (Uzbekistan) 0–1 (Saudi Arabia) Al-Ittihad
    - Persepolis (Iran) 1–1 (United Arab Emirates) Al-Wahda
      - Standings (after 2 matches): Al-Ittihad 6 points, Al-Wahda 2, Bunyodkor, Persepolis 1.
  - Group D:
    - Emirates (United Arab Emirates) 2–0 (Qatar) Al-Rayyan
    - Al-Shabab (Saudi Arabia) 0–0 (Iran) Zob Ahan
      - Standings (after 2 matches): Zob Ahan 4 points, Emirates 3, Al-Shabab 2, Al-Rayyan 1.
  - Group G:
    - Shandong Luneng (China) 2–0 (Japan) Cerezo Osaka
    - Arema FC (Indonesia) 0–4 (South Korea) Jeonbuk Hyundai Motors
      - Standings (after 2 matches): Jeonbuk Hyundai Motors 6 points, Shandong Luneng, Cerezo Osaka 3, Arema FC 0.
  - Group H:
    - Kashima Antlers (Japan) – (Australia) Sydney FC — postponed due to the Tōhoku earthquake
    - Suwon Samsung Bluewings (South Korea) 4–0 (China) Shanghai Shenhua
      - Standings: Suwon Bluewings 4 points (2 matches), Kashima Antlers, Sydney FC 1 (1), Shanghai Shenhua 1 (2).
- AFC Cup group stage, matchday 2:
  - Group C:
    - Duhok (Iraq) 4–2 (Jordan) Al-Faisaly
    - Al-Jaish (Syria) 2–1 (Kuwait) Al-Nasr
      - Standings (after 2 matches): Duhok 6 points, Al-Faisaly, Al-Jaish 3, Al-Nasr 0.
  - Group D:
    - Al-Wehdat (Jordan) 5–1 (Oman) Al-Suwaiq
    - Al-Kuwait 1–0 (Iraq) Al-Talaba
      - Standings (after 2 matches): Al-Wehdat, Al-Kuwait 6 points, Al-Talaba, Al-Suwaiq 0.
  - Group G:
    - Hà Nội T&T (Vietnam) 2–0 (Maldives) Victory
    - Tampines Rovers (Singapore) 1–1 (Thailand) Muangthong United
      - Standings (after 2 matches): Muangthong United, Tampines Rovers 4 points, Hà Nội T&T 3, Victory 0.
  - Group H:
    - Persipura Jayapura (Indonesia) 4–1 (India) Kingfisher East Bengal
    - Chonburi (Thailand) 3–0 (Hong Kong) South China
      - Standings (after 2 matches): Chonburi, Persipura Jayapura 4 points, Kingfisher East Bengal, South China 1.
- CONCACAF Champions League semifinals, first leg:
  - Monterrey (Mexico) 2–1 (Mexico) Cruz Azul
- UEFA Women's Champions League quarter-finals, first leg:
  - Juvisy (France) 0–3 (Germany) Turbine Potsdam

=== March 15, 2011 (Tuesday) ===
==== Basketball ====
- NCAA Division I Men's Tournament:
  - First Four in Dayton, Ohio:
    - UNC Asheville 81, Arkansas–Little Rock 77 (OT)
    - Clemson 70, UAB 52

==== Cricket ====
- World Cup (team in **bold** advances to the quarter-finals):
  - Group B: **South Africa** 272/7 (50 overs); Ireland 141 (33.2 overs) in Kolkata, India. **South Africa win by 131 runs.**
    - Standings: South Africa 8 points (5 matches), India 7 (5), West Indies 6 (4), Bangladesh 6 (5), England 5 (5), Ireland 2 (5), Netherlands 0 (5).

==== Cycling ====
- UCI World Tour:
  - Tirreno–Adriatico, Stage 7: (gold) Fabian Cancellara (SUI) (Leopard Trek) 10' 33" (silver) Lars Boom (NED) (Rabobank) + 9" (bronze) Adriano Malori (ITA) (Lampre–ISD) + 19"
    - Final general classification: (1) Cadel Evans (AUS) (BMC Racing Team) 27h 37' 37" (2) Robert Gesink (NED) (Rabobank) + 11" (3) Michele Scarponi (ITA) (Lampre–ISD) + 15"
      - World Tour standings (after 3 of 27 races): (1) Evans & Tony Martin (GER) (HTC–Highroad) 108 points (3) Cameron Meyer (AUS) (Garmin–Cervélo) 106

==== Football (soccer) ====
- South American Under-17 Championship in Ecuador:
  - Group A:
    - Peru 1–1 Ecuador
    - Bolivia 0–2 Uruguay
      - Standings: Ecuador 4 points (2 matches), Argentina, Uruguay 3 (1), Peru 1 (2), Bolivia 0 (2).
- UEFA Champions League Round of 16, second leg (first leg score in parentheses):
  - **Manchester United** (England) 2–1 (0–0) (France) Marseille. Manchester United win 2–1 on aggregate.
  - Bayern Munich (Germany) 2–3 (1–0) (Italy) **Internazionale**. 3–3 on aggregate; Internazionale win on away goals.
- Copa Libertadores second stage (team in **bold** advances to the knockout stage):
  - Group 1:
    - Universidad San Martín (Peru) 0–1 (Paraguay) **Libertad**
    - Once Caldas (Colombia) 1–1 (Mexico) San Luis
      - Standings (after 4 matches): Libertad 10 points, Universidad San Martín 6, Once Caldas 3, San Luis 2.
  - Group 3: Argentinos Juniors (Argentina) 0–1 (Uruguay) Nacional
    - Standings: Argentinos Juniors 7 points (4 matches), (Mexico) América 6 (3), Nacional 4 (4), (Brazil) Fluminense 2 (3).
- AFC Champions League group stage, matchday 2:
  - Group A:
    - Al-Gharafa (Qatar) 0–1 (Saudi Arabia) Al-Hilal
    - Sepahan (Iran) 5–1 (United Arab Emirates) Al-Jazira
      - Standings (after 2 matches): Sepahan 6 points, Al-Hilal 3, Al-Gharafa, Al-Jazira 1.
  - Group B: Al-Nassr (Saudi Arabia) 2–1 (Iran) Esteghlal
    - Standings: Al-Nassr 4 points (2 matches), (Uzbekistan) Pakhtakor, (Qatar) Al-Sadd 1 (1), Esteghlal 1 (2).
  - Group E:
    - Melbourne Victory (Australia) 1–2 (South Korea) Jeju United
    - Tianjin Teda (China) 2–1 (Japan) Gamba Osaka
      - Standings (after 2 matches): Tianjin Teda 6 points, Gamba Osaka, Jeju United 3, Melbourne Victory 0.
  - Group F:
    - Nagoya Grampus (Japan) – (United Arab Emirates) Al-Ain — postponed due to the Tōhoku earthquake
    - FC Seoul (South Korea) 3–0 (China) Hangzhou Greentown
      - Standings: FC Seoul 6 points (2 matches), Hangzhou Greentown 3 (2), Al-Ain, Nagoya Grampus 0 (1).
- AFC Cup group stage, matchday 2:
  - Group A:
    - Al-Tilal (Yemen) 2–3 (Uzbekistan) Nasaf Qarshi
    - Al-Ansar (Lebanon) 2–0 (India) Dempo
      - Standings (after 2 matches): Nasaf Qarshi 6 points, Al-Ansar, Dempo 3, Al-Tilal 0.
  - Group B:
    - Shurtan Guzar (Uzbekistan) 7–2 (Yemen) Al-Saqr
    - Al-Ittihad (Syria) 0–2 (Kuwait) Al-Qadsia
      - Standings (after 2 matches): Al-Qadsia 6 points, Shurtan Guzar, Al-Ittihad 3, Al-Saqr 0.
  - Group E:
    - Arbil (Iraq) 1–1 (Syria) Al-Karamah
    - Al-Oruba (Oman) 1–0 (Lebanon) Al Ahed
      - Standings (after 2 matches): Al-Oruba, Arbil 4 points, Al-Karamah 2, Al Ahed 0.
  - Group F:
    - VB (Maldives) 1–3 (Vietnam) Sông Lam Nghệ An
    - TSW Pegasus (Hong Kong) 1–2 (Indonesia) Sriwijaya
      - Standings (after 2 matches): Sriwijaya 4 points, Sông Lam Nghệ An, TSW Pegasus 3, VB 1.
- CONCACAF Champions League semifinals, first leg:
  - Real Salt Lake (United States) 2–0 (Costa Rica) Saprissa

=== March 14, 2011 (Monday) ===
==== Cricket ====
- World Cup (teams in **bold** advance to the quarter-finals):
  - Group A: Zimbabwe 151/7 (39.4/43 overs); **Pakistan** 164/3 (34.1/38 overs) in Kandy, Sri Lanka. **Pakistan win by 7 wickets (D/L).**
    - Standings: **New Zealand**, Pakistan 8 points (5 matches), **Sri Lanka** 7 (5), **Australia** 7 (4), Zimbabwe, Canada 2 (5), Kenya 0 (5).
  - Group B: Netherlands 160 (46.2 overs); Bangladesh 166/4 (41.2 overs) in Chittagong, Bangladesh. **Bangladesh win by 6 wickets.**
    - Standings: India 7 points (5 matches), West Indies, South Africa 6 (4), Bangladesh 6 (5), England 5 (5), Ireland 2 (4), Netherlands 0 (5).

==== Cycling ====
- UCI World Tour:
  - Tirreno–Adriatico, Stage 6: (gold) Cadel Evans (AUS) (BMC Racing Team) 4h 37' 58" (silver) Giovanni Visconti (ITA) (Farnese Vini–Neri Sottoli) s.t. (bronze) Michele Scarponi (ITA) (Lampre–ISD) s.t.
    - General classification (after stage 6): (1) Evans 27h 26' 33" (2) Scarponi + 9" (3) Ivan Basso (ITA)(Liquigas–Cannondale) + 12"

==== Snooker ====
- Hainan Classic in Boao, China:
  - Final: **John Higgins** (SCO) 7–2 Jamie Cope (ENG)
    - Higgins wins his 36th professional title.

=== March 13, 2011 (Sunday) ===
==== Alpine skiing ====
- Men's World Cup in Kvitfjell, Norway:
  - Super-G: (gold) Didier Cuche (SUI) 1:33.05 (silver) Klaus Kröll (AUT) 1:33.35 (bronze) Joachim Puchner (AUT) 1:33.39
    - Super G standings (after 6 of 7 races): (1) Cuche 291 points (2) Georg Streitberger (AUT) 227 (3) Ivica Kostelić (CRO) 223
    - Overall standings (after 34 of 38 races): (1) Kostelić 1356 points (2) Cuche 906 (3) Carlo Janka (SUI) 767

==== Badminton ====
- BWF Super Series:
  - All England Super Series in Birmingham:
    - Men's singles: **Lee Chong Wei** (MAS) def. Lin Dan (CHN) 21–17, 21–17
    - Women's singles: **Wang Shixian** (CHN) def. Eriko Hirose (JPN) 24–22, 21–18
    - Men's doubles: **Mathias Boe**/**Carsten Mogensen** (DEN) def. Koo Kien Keat/Tan Boon Heong (MAS) 15–21, 21–18, 21–18
    - Women's doubles: **Wang Xiaoli**/**Yu Yang** (CHN) vs. Mizuki Fujii/Reika Kakiiwa (JPN) 21–2, 21–9
    - Mixed doubles: **Xu Chen**/**Ma Jin** (CHN) vs. Sudket Prapakamol/Saralee Thungthongkam (THA) 21–13, 21–9

==== Basketball ====
- U.S. college conference championship games:
  - Men's (winners advance to the NCAA tournament):
    - Atlantic Coast Conference in Greensboro, North Carolina: Duke 75, North Carolina 58
    - Atlantic 10 Conference in Atlantic City, New Jersey: Richmond 67, Dayton 54
    - Big Ten Conference in Indianapolis: Ohio State 71, Penn State 60
    - Southeastern Conference in Atlanta: Kentucky 70, Florida 54
  - Women's (winners advance to the NCAA tournament):
    - Big South Conference in High Point, North Carolina: Gardner–Webb 67, Liberty 66
    - Colonial Athletic Association in Upper Marlboro, Maryland: James Madison 67, Delaware 61
    - Horizon League in Green Bay, Wisconsin: Green Bay 74, Butler 63
    - Missouri Valley Conference in St. Charles, Missouri: Northern Iowa 69, Missouri State 41
    - Northeast Conference in Loretto, Pennsylvania: St. Francis (PA) 72, Monmouth 57
- News: The International Basketball Federation (FIBA) decide that the British men and women national teams will automatically qualify for the 2012 Olympics in London.

==== Biathlon ====
- World Championships in Khanty-Mansiysk, Russia:
  - Women's relay: (gold) Germany (Andrea Henkel, Miriam Gössner, Tina Bachmann, Magdalena Neuner) 1:13:31.1 (2+13) (silver) Ukraine (Valj Semerenko, Vita Semerenko, Olena Pidhrushna, Oksana Khvostenko) 1:13:55.6 (0+4) (bronze) France (Anais Bescond, Marie-Laure Brunet, Sophie Boilley, Marie Dorin) 1:14:18.3 (0+9)
    - Bachmann and Gössner win their first world titles. Henkel wins the title for the third time, and seventh overall, and Neuner also wins the title for the third time, for her fourth title of the championships and tenth overall.
    - Final World Cup standings: (1) Germany 206 points (2) Sweden 188 (3) Ukraine 185

==== Cricket ====
- World Cup (teams in **bold** advance to the quarter-finals):
  - Group A:
    - **New Zealand** 358/6 (50 overs; Brendon McCullum 101); Canada 261/9 (50 overs) in Mumbai, India. **New Zealand win by 97 runs.**
    - **Australia** 324/6 (50 overs); Kenya 264/6 (50 overs) in Bangalore, India. **Australia win by 60 runs.**
      - Standings: New Zealand 8 points (5 matches), **Sri Lanka** 7 (5), Australia 7 (4), Pakistan 6 (4), Zimbabwe 2 (4), Canada 2 (5), Kenya 0 (5).

==== Cross-country skiing ====
- World Cup in Lahti, Finland:
  - Men's sprint classical: (gold) Emil Jönsson (SWE) 3:08.7 (silver) Eirik Brandsdal (NOR) 3:09.4 (bronze) Pål Golberg (NOR) 3:09.7
    - Sprint standings (after 10 of 11 races): (1) Jönsson 530 points (2) Ola Vigen Hattestad (NOR) 364 (3) Alexei Petukhov (RUS) 277
    - Overall standings (after 27 of 31 races): (1) Dario Cologna (SUI) 1367 points (2) Petter Northug (NOR) 894 (3) Daniel Rickardsson (SWE) 829
  - Women's sprint classical: (gold) Marit Bjørgen (NOR) 3:30.2 (silver) Astrid Uhrenholdt Jacobsen (NOR) 3:33.2 (bronze) Petra Majdič (SLO) 3:34.1
    - Sprint standings (after 10 of 11 races): (1) Majdič 430 points (2) Arianna Follis (ITA) 423 (3) Kikkan Randall (USA) 401
    - Overall standings (after 27 of 31 races): (1) Justyna Kowalczyk (POL) 1789 points (2) Bjørgen 1232 (3) Follis 1125

==== Cycling ====
- UCI World Tour:
  - Paris–Nice, Stage 8: (gold) Thomas Voeckler (FRA) (Team Europcar) 3h 15' 58" (silver) Diego Ulissi (ITA) (Lampre–ISD) + 23" (bronze) Julien El Fares (FRA) (Cofidis) + 1' 06"
    - Final general classification: (1) Tony Martin (GER) (HTC–Highroad) 34h 03' 37" (2) Andreas Klöden (GER) (Team RadioShack) + 36" (3) Bradley Wiggins (GBR) (Team Sky) + 41"
      - World Tour standings (after 2 of 27 races): (1) Martin 108 points (2) Cameron Meyer (AUS) (Garmin–Cervélo) 106 (3) Matthew Goss (AUS) (HTC–Highroad) 103
  - Tirreno–Adriatico, Stage 5: (gold) Philippe Gilbert (BEL) (Omega Pharma–Lotto) 6h 43' 23" (silver) Wout Poels (NED) (Vacansoleil–DCM) s.t. (bronze) Damiano Cunego (ITA) (Lampre–ISD) s.t.
    - General classification (after stage 5): (1) Cadel Evans (AUS) (BMC Racing Team) 22h 48' 45" (2) Ivan Basso (ITA) (Liquigas–Cannondale) + 2" (3) Cunego + 3"

==== Diving ====
- European Championships in Turin, Italy:
  - Men's 10 m platform: (gold) Sascha Klein (GER) 515.05 points (silver) Patrick Hausding (GER) 506.10 (bronze) Oleksandr Bondar (UKR) 493.95
  - Women's 3 m springboard synchro: (gold) Tania Cagnotto/Francesca Dallapé (ITA) 320.40 points (silver) Nadezhda Bazhina/Svetlana Philippova (RUS) 317.13 (bronze) Katja Dieckow/Uschi Freitag (GER) 295.50

==== Football (soccer) ====
- South American Under-17 Championship in Ecuador:
  - Group B:
    - Brazil 4–3 Venezuela
    - Colombia 2–2 Chile
- (Australia) A-League Grand Final in Brisbane:
  - **Brisbane Roar** 2–2 (4–2 pen.) Central Coast Mariners
    - Brisbane win the title for the first time.

==== Freestyle skiing ====
- World Cup in Branas, Sweden:
  - Men's ski cross: (gold) Andreas Matt (AUT) (silver) Christopher Del Bosco (CAN) (bronze) Conradign Netzer (SUI)
    - ski cross standings (after 10 of 11 events): (1) Matt 779 points (2) Del Bosco 515 (3) Jouni Pellinen (FIN) 422
    - Overall standings: (1) Matt 78 points (2) Guilbaut Colas (FRA) 74 (3) Alexandre Bilodeau (CAN) 68
  - Women's ski cross: (gold) Anna Holmlund (SWE) (silver) Kelsey Serwa (CAN) (bronze) Marte Høie Gjefsen (NOR)
    - ski cross standings (after 10 of 11 events): (1) Holmlund 572 points (2) Heidi Zacher (GER) 567 (3) Serwa 530
    - Overall standings: (1) Hannah Kearney (USA) 91 points (2) Jennifer Heil (CAN) & Cheng Shuang (CHN) 63

==== Golf ====
- World Golf Championships:
  - WGC-Cadillac Championship in Doral, Florida, United States:
    - Winner: Nick Watney (USA) 272 (−16)
      - Watney wins his first WGC title, and his third PGA Tour title.
- PGA Tour:
  - Puerto Rico Open in Río Grande, Puerto Rico:
    - Winner: Michael Bradley (USA) 272 (−16)^{PO}
      - Bradley defeats Troy Matteson (USA) on the first playoff hole, to win the title for the second time in three years, and his fourth PGA Tour title.
- Champions Tour:
  - Toshiba Classic in Newport Beach, California:
    - Winner: Nick Price (ZIM) 196 (−17)
      - Price wins his fourth Champions Tour title.

==== Rugby union ====
- Six Nations Championship, Week 4:
  - Calcutta Cup: England 22–16 Scotland in London
    - Standings (after 4 matches): England 8 points, Wales 6, France, Ireland 4, Italy 2, Scotland 0.

==== Short track speed skating ====
- World Championships in Sheffield, Great Britain:
  - Men's 1000 m: (1) Noh Jin-Kyu (KOR) 1:28.552 (2) Charles Hamelin (CAN) 1:28.663 (3) Liang Wenhao (CHN) 1:29.203
  - Men's 3000 m: (1) Noh 4:51.638 (2) Liang 4:51.877 (3) Jeff Simon (USA) 4:52.181
    - Final standings: (gold) Noh 102 points (silver) Hamelin 50 (bronze) Liang 47
  - Women's 1000 m: (1) Cho Ha-Ri (KOR) 1:38.895 (2) Arianna Fontana (ITA) 1:40.306 (3) Katherine Reutter (USA) 2:23.268
  - Women's 3000 m: (1) Cho 5:13.353 (2) Reutter 5:13.677 (3) Liu Qiuhong (CHN) 5:17.206
    - Final standings: (gold) Cho 81 points (silver) Reutter 68 (bronze) Fontana 57
  - Men's 5000 m relay: (gold) Canada (Michael Gilday, Charles Hamelin, François Hamelin, Olivier Jean) 6:52.731 (silver) Germany ([[Robert Becker (Shorttracker)]], Paul Herrmann, Christoph Milz, Robert Seifert) 6:54.693 (bronze) United States (Kyle Carr, Travis Jayner, Anthony Lobello Jr., Simon) 7:01.659

==== Ski jumping ====
- World Cup in Lahti, Finland:
  - HS 130: (gold) Simon Ammann (SUI) 286.8 points (silver) Andreas Kofler (AUT) 282.3 (bronze) Severin Freund (GER) 280.0
    - Standings (after 24 of 26 events): (1) Thomas Morgenstern (AUT) 1641 points (2) Ammann 1309 (3) Kofler 1096

==== Snowboarding ====
- World Cup in Bardonecchia, Italy:
  - Men's Slopestyle: (gold) Alexey Sobolev (RUS) 25.0 points (silver) Milu Multhaup-Appleton (NZL) 24.3 (bronze) Clemens Schattschneider (AUT) 23.1
    - Final Big Air/Slopestyle standings: (1) Schattschneider 2960 points (2) Sebastien Toutant (CAN) 2220 (3) Rocco van Straten (NED) 1845
    - Freestyle overall standings: (1) Schattschneider 3108 points (2) Nathan Johnstone (AUS) 3060 (3) Ryō Aono (JPN) 2800
  - Women's Slopestyle: (gold) Katarzyna Rusin (POL) 22.6 points (silver) Anja Stefan (CRO) 22.0 (bronze) Lou Chabelard (FRA) 19.6
    - Final Slopestyle standings: (1) Allyson Carroll (USA) & Rusin 1000 points (3) Stefan & Brooke Voigt (CAN) 800
    - Freestyle overall standings: (1) Cai Xuetong (CHN) 3800 points (2) Holly Crawford (AUS) 3100 (3) Mirabelle Thovex (FRA) 1950

==== Speed skating ====
- World Single Distance Championships in Inzell, Germany:
  - Women's 500 m: (1) Jenny Wolf (GER) 1:15.93 (37.98 / 37.95) (2) Lee Sang-hwa (KOR) 1:16.17 (38.14 / 38.03) (3) Wang Beixing (CHN) 1:16.39 (38.35 / 38.04)
  - Men's 500 m: (1) Lee Kyou-hyuk (KOR) 1:09.10 (34.78 / 34.32) (2) Joji Kato (JPN) 1:09.42 (34.90 / 34.52) (3) Jan Smeekens (NED) 1:09.43 (34.77 / 34.66)
  - Women's team pursuit: (gold) Canada (Christine Nesbitt, Brittany Schussler, Cindy Klassen) 2:59.74 (silver) Netherlands (Ireen Wüst, Diane Valkenburg, Marrit Leenstra) 3:00.43 (bronze) Germany (Stephanie Beckert, Isabell Ost, Claudia Pechstein) 3:01.82
  - Men's team pursuit: (gold) United States (Shani Davis, Trevor Marsicano, Jonathan Kuck) 3:41.72 (silver) Canada (Denny Morrison, Lucas Makowsky, Mathieu Giroux) 3:41.85 (bronze) Netherlands (Bob de Vries, Jan Blokhuijsen, Koen Verweij) 3:43.44

=== March 12, 2011 (Saturday) ===
==== Alpine skiing ====
- Women's World Cup in Špindlerův Mlýn, Czech Republic:
  - Slalom: (gold) Marlies Schild (AUT) 1:43.85 (50.02 / 53.83) (silver) Kathrin Zettel (AUT) 1:44.78 (50.20 / 54.58) (bronze) Tina Maze (SLO) 1:45.01 (50.74 / 54.27)
    - Slalom standings (after 8 of 9 races): (1) Schild 600 points (2) Tanja Poutiainen (FIN) 489 (3) Maria Riesch (GER) 420
      - Schild wins her third slalom World Cup title.
    - Overall standings (after 31 of 35 races): (1) Riesch 1678 points (2) Lindsey Vonn (USA) 1655 (3) Maze 1003
- Men's World Cup in Kvitfjell, Norway:
  - Downhill: (gold) Michael Walchhofer (AUT) 1:45.92 (silver) Klaus Kröll (AUT) 1:46.05 (bronze) Beat Feuz (SUI) 1:46.23
    - Downhill standings (after 8 of 9 races): (1) Walchhofer 474 points (2) Didier Cuche (SUI) 460 (3) Kröll 395
    - Overall standings (after 33 of 38 races): (1) Ivica Kostelić (CRO) 1324 points (2) Cuche 806 (3) Carlo Janka (SUI) 738
      - Kostelić becomes the first Croatian man to win the overall World Cup title, and the second Croatian ever, after sister Janica.

==== Basketball ====
- U.S. college conference championship games:
  - Men's (winners advance to the NCAA tournament):
    - America East Conference in Boston: Boston University 56, Stony Brook 54
    - Big 12 Conference in Kansas City, Missouri: Kansas 85, Texas 73
    - Big East Conference in New York City: Connecticut 69, Louisville 66
    - Big West Conference in Anaheim, California: UC Santa Barbara 64, Long Beach State 56
    - Conference USA in El Paso, Texas: Memphis 67, UTEP 66
    - Ivy League one-game playoff in New Haven, Connecticut: Princeton 63, Harvard 62
    - Mid-America Conference in Cleveland: Akron 66, Kent State 65 (OT)
    - MEAC in Winston-Salem, North Carolina: Hampton 60, Morgan State 55
    - Mountain West Conference in Paradise, Nevada: San Diego State 72, BYU 54
    - Pacific-10 Conference in Los Angeles: Washington 77, Arizona 75 (OT)
    - Southland Conference in Katy, Texas: UTSA 75, McNeese State 72
    - SWAC in Garland, Texas: Alabama State 65, Grambling State 48
    - Western Athletic Conference in Paradise, Nevada: Utah State 77, Boise State 69
  - Other men's conference championship game (winner does not receive an automatic bid):
    - Great West Conference in Orem, Utah: North Dakota 77, South Dakota 76 (2OT)
  - Women's (winners advance to the NCAA tournament):
    - America East Conference in Hartford, Connecticut: Hartford 65, Boston University 53
    - Big 12 Conference in Kansas City, Missouri: Baylor 61, Texas A&M 58
    - Big Sky Conference in Portland, Oregon: Montana 62, Portland State 58
    - Big West Conference in Anaheim, California: UC Davis 66, Cal Poly 49
    - Conference USA in El Paso, Texas: UCF 85, Tulane 73
    - Mid-America Conference in Cleveland: Bowling Green 51, Eastern Michigan 46
    - MEAC in Winston-Salem, North Carolina: Hampton 61, Howard 42
    - Mountain West Conference in Paradise, Nevada: Utah 52, TCU 47 (OT)
    - Pacific-10 Conference in Los Angeles: Stanford 64, UCLA 55
    - Patriot League in Annapolis, Maryland: Navy 47, American 40
    - SWAC in Garland, Texas: Prairie View A&M 48, Southern 44
    - Western Athletic Conference in Paradise, Nevada: Fresno State 78, Louisiana Tech 76
  - Other women's conference championship game (winner does not receive an automatic bid):
    - Great West Conference in Orem, Utah: Chicago State 74, North Dakota 66

==== Biathlon ====
- World Championships in Khanty-Mansiysk, Russia:
  - Men's Mass start: (gold) Emil Hegle Svendsen (NOR) 38:42.7 (0+0+0+1) (silver) Evgeny Ustyugov (RUS) 38:47.7 (0+0+0+0) (bronze) Lukas Hofer (ITA) 38:57.0 (0+0+0+1)
    - Svendsen wins his second title of the championships, and fifth overall.
    - World Cup mass start standings (after 4 of 5 races): (1) Martin Fourcade (FRA) 194 points (2) Svendsen 184 (3) Tarjei Bø (NOR) 177
    - World Cup overall standings (after 23 of 26 races): (1) Bø 1022 points (2) Svendsen 947 (3) Fourcade 900
  - Women's Mass start: (gold) Magdalena Neuner (GER) 36:48.5 (0+1+2+1) (silver) Darya Domracheva (BLR) 36:53.3 (2+1+0+0) (bronze) Tora Berger (NOR) 37:02.5 (2+1+0+0)
    - Neuner wins her second title of the championships, and ninth overall.
    - World Cup mass start standings (after 4 of 5 races): (1) Neuner 190 points (2) Berger 181 (3) Domracheva 176
    - World Cup overall standings (after 23 of 26 races): (1) Kaisa Mäkäräinen (FIN) 914 points (2) Helena Ekholm (SWE) 907 (3) Neuner 854

==== Cricket ====
- World Cup:
  - Group B: India 296 (48.4 overs; Sachin Tendulkar 111, Dale Steyn 5/50); South Africa 300/7 (49.4 overs) in Nagpur, India. **South Africa win by 3 wickets.**
    - Standings: India 7 points (5 matches), West Indies, South Africa 6 (4), England 5 (5), Bangladesh 4 (4), Ireland 2 (4), Netherlands 0 (4).

==== Cross-country skiing ====
- World Cup in Lahti, Finland:
  - Men's 20 km pursuit: (gold) Dario Cologna (SUI) 47:31.3 (silver) Maurice Manificat (FRA) 47:31.9 (bronze) Vincent Vittoz (FRA) 47:32.3
    - Distance standings (after 15 of 17 races): (1) Cologna 651 points (2) Daniel Rickardsson (SWE) 501 (3) Lukáš Bauer (CZE) 491
    - Overall standings (after 26 of 31 races): (1) Cologna 1367 points (2) Petter Northug (NOR) 894 (3) Rickardsson 816
  - Women's 10 km pursuit: (gold) Therese Johaug (NOR) 25:43.9 (silver) Justyna Kowalczyk (POL) 25:43.9 (bronze) Arianna Follis (ITA) 26:07.4
    - Distance standings (after 15 of 17 races): (1) Kowalczyk 947 points (2) Marit Bjørgen (NOR) 675 (3) Johaug 585
    - Overall standings (after 26 of 31 races): (1) Kowalczyk 1739 points (2) Bjørgen 1132 (3) Follis 1085

==== Cycling ====
- UCI World Tour:
  - Paris–Nice, Stage 7: (gold) Rémy Di Gregorio (FRA) (Astana) 5h 46' 23" (silver) Samuel Sánchez (ESP) (Euskaltel–Euskadi) + 5" (bronze) Rigoberto Urán (COL) (Team Sky) + 5"
    - General classification (after stage 7): (1) Tony Martin (GER) (HTC–Highroad) 30h 46' 17" (2) Andreas Klöden (GER) (Team RadioShack) + 36" (3) Bradley Wiggins (GBR) (Team Sky) + 41"
  - Tirreno–Adriatico, Stage 4: (gold) Michele Scarponi (ITA) (Lampre–ISD) 6h 10' 59" (silver) Damiano Cunego (ITA) (Lampre–ISD) s.t. (bronze) Cadel Evans (AUS) (BMC Racing Team) s.t.
    - General classification (after stage 4): (1) Robert Gesink (NED) (Rabobank) 16h 05' 10" (2) Cadel Evans (AUS) (BMC Racing Team) + 10" (3) Ivan Basso (ITA) (Liquigas–Cannondale) + 12"

==== Diving ====
- European Championships in Turin, Italy:
  - Men's 10 m platform synchro: (gold) Sascha Klein/Patrick Hausding (GER) 467.16 points (silver) Oleksandr Bondar/Oleksandr Gorshkovozov (UKR) 458.34 (bronze) Victor Minibaev/Ilya Zakharov (RUS) 441.15
  - Women's 3 m springboard: (gold) Anna Lindberg (SWE) 347.10 points (silver) Nadezhda Bazhina (RUS) 325.55 (bronze) Tania Cagnotto (ITA) 324.25

==== Equestrianism ====
- Show jumping:
  - FEI World Cup North American League – East Coast:
    - 14th competition in Wellington, Florida (CSI 4*-W): (gold) Rodrigo Pessoa (BRA) on Let's Fly (silver) Nick Skelton (GBR) on Carlo (bronze) Lauren Hough (USA) on Quick Study
      - Standings (after 13 of 14 competitions): (1) Michelle Spadone (USA) 107 points (2) Margie Goldstein-Engle (USA) 102 (3) McLain Ward (USA) 96

==== Football (soccer) ====
- South American Under-17 Championship in Ecuador:
  - Group A:
    - Ecuador 2–1 Bolivia
    - Argentina 4–2 Peru

==== Freestyle skiing ====
- World Cup in Åre, Sweden:
  - Men's dual moguls: (gold) Alexandre Bilodeau (CAN) 20.00 points (silver) Guilbaut Colas (FRA) 15.00 (bronze) Patrick Deneen (USA) 35.00
    - Moguls standings (after 10 of 11 events): (1) Colas 741 points (2) Bilodeau 679 (3) Mikaël Kingsbury (CAN) 645
    - Overall standings: (1) Andreas Matt (AUT) 75 points (2) Colas 74 (3) Bilodeau 68
  - Women's dual moguls: (gold) Hannah Kearney (USA) 23.00 points (silver) Justine Dufour-Lapointe (CAN) 12.00 (bronze) Jennifer Heil (CAN) 18.00
    - Moguls standings (after 10 of 11 events): (1) Kearney 909 points (2) Heil 632 (3) Audrey Robichaud (CAN) 421
    - Overall standings: (1) Kearney 91 points (2) Heil & Cheng Shuang (CHN) 63

==== Mixed martial arts ====
- Zuffa, the parent company of the UFC, has purchased the rival Strikeforce promotion, with an official announcement expected on March 14. Zuffa will continue to operate Strikeforce as a separate promotion.

==== Nordic combined ====
- World Cup in Lahti, Finland:
  - HS 130 / 10 km: (gold) Johannes Rydzek (GER) 24:35.3 (silver) Eric Frenzel (GER) 24:35.3 (bronze) Felix Gottwald (AUT) 24:36.2
    - Final standings: (1) Jason Lamy-Chappuis (FRA) 894 points (2) Mikko Kokslien (NOR) 656 (3) Gottwald 638
      - Lamy-Chappuis wins his second consecutive World Cup title.

==== Rugby union ====
- Six Nations Championship, Week 4:
  - Italy 22–21 France in Rome
  - Wales 19–13 Ireland in Cardiff
    - In Ireland's loss, Ronan O'Gara becomes the fifth player in history to amass 1,000 career points in Tests, and Brian O'Driscoll equals the all-time record of pre-World War II Scotland player Ian Smith for career tries in the Championship with 24.
    - Standings: England 6 points (3 matches), Wales 6 (4), France, Ireland 4 (4), Italy 2 (4), Scotland 0 (3).
- European Nations Cup First Division, week 4:
  - Georgia 18–11 Romania in Tbilisi
  - Spain 25–10 Portugal in Madrid
  - Ukraine 5–41 Russia in Odesa
    - Standings: Georgia 18 points (4 matches), Russia, Spain 10 (4), Portugal 9 (4), Romania 6 (3), Ukraine 0 (3).

==== Short track speed skating ====
- World Championships in Sheffield, Great Britain:
  - Women's 500 m: (1) Fan Kexin (CHN) 44.620 (2) Arianna Fontana (ITA) 44.687 (3) Liu Qiuhong (CHN) 44.784
  - Men's 500 m: (1) Simon Cho (USA) 42.307 (2) Olivier Jean (CAN) 42.429 (3) Liang Wenhao (CHN) 42.493

==== Ski jumping ====
- World Cup in Lahti, Finland:
  - HS 130 Team: (gold) Austria (Gregor Schlierenzauer, Martin Koch, Andreas Kofler, Thomas Morgenstern) 1086.0 points (silver) Norway (Anders Bardal, Johan Remen Evensen, Anders Jacobsen, Tom Hilde) 1065.3 (bronze) Poland (Tomasz Byrt, Piotr Żyła, Kamil Stoch, Adam Małysz) 1028.3

==== Speed skating ====
- World Single Distance Championships in Inzell, Germany:
  - Women's 1000 m: (1) Christine Nesbitt (CAN) 1:14.84 (2) Ireen Wüst (NED) 1:15.42 (3) Heather Richardson (USA) 1:15.45
  - Men's 10,000 m: (1) Bob de Jong (NED) 12:48.20 (2) Bob de Vries (NED) 13:04.62 (3) Ivan Skobrev (RUS) 13:08.17
  - Women's 5000 m: (1) Martina Sáblíková (CZE) 6:50.83 (2) Stephanie Beckert (GER) 6:54.99 (3) Claudia Pechstein (GER) 7:00.90

=== March 11, 2011 (Friday) ===
==== Alpine skiing ====
- Women's World Cup in Špindlerův Mlýn, Czech Republic:
  - Giant slalom: (gold) Viktoria Rebensburg (GER) 2:15.22 (1:06.62 / 1:08.60) (silver) Denise Karbon (ITA) 2:16.48 (1:07.31 / 1:09.17) (bronze) Lindsey Vonn (USA) 2:16.67 (1:07.63 / 1:09.04)
    - Giant slalom standings (after 6 of 7 races): (1) Rebensburg 435 points (2) Tessa Worley (FRA) 358 (3) Tanja Poutiainen (FIN) 240
    - Overall standings (after 30 of 35 races): (1) Maria Riesch (GER) 1678 points (2) Vonn 1640 (3) Tina Maze (SLO) 943
- Men's World Cup in Kvitfjell, Norway:
  - Downhill: (gold) Beat Feuz (SUI) 1:47.39 (silver) Erik Guay (CAN) 1:47.44 (bronze) Michael Walchhofer (AUT) 1:47.50
    - Downhill standings (after 7 of 9 races): (1) Didier Cuche (SUI) 424 points (2) Walchhofer 374 (3) Klaus Kröll (AUT) 315
    - Overall standings (after 32 of 38 races): (1) Ivica Kostelić (CRO) 1314 points (2) Cuche 770 (3) Aksel Lund Svindal (NOR) 725

==== American football ====
- The National Football League and the National Football League Players Association (NFLPA) break off negotiations for a new collective bargaining agreement. The NFLPA decertifies itself as the players' bargaining agent, and 10 players file an antirust suit against the league in federal court. The NFL responds by locking out the players.

==== Basketball ====
- U.S. college conference championship games:
  - Men's (winner advances to the NCAA tournament):
    - Patriot League in Lewisburg, Pennsylvania: Bucknell 72, Lafayette 57
  - Women's (winner advances to the NCAA tournament):
    - Southland Conference in Katy, Texas: McNeese State 71, Central Arkansas 50

==== Biathlon ====
- World Championships in Khanty-Mansiysk, Russia:
  - Men's relay: (gold) Norway (Ole Einar Bjørndalen, Alexander Os, Emil Hegle Svendsen, Tarjei Bø) 1:16:13.9 (2+10) (silver) Russia (Anton Shipulin, Evgeny Ustyugov, Maxim Maksimov, Ivan Tcherezov) 1:16:27.3 (0+8) (bronze) Ukraine (Olexander Bilanenko, Andriy Deryzemlya, Serhiy Semenov, Serguei Sednev) 1:16:41.9 (0+10)
    - Norway wins the event for the second successive time. Bø wins his third title of the championships. Bjørndalen wins his second title of the championships and 16th overall, and his 10th World Championships medal in the relay event. Svendsen win his first title of the championships and fourth overall. Os wins his first title ever.
    - Final World Cup relay standings: (1) Norway 216 points (2) Germany 199 (3) Ukraine 163

==== Cricket ====
- World Cup:
  - Group B:
    - West Indies 275 (50 overs; Devon Smith 107); Ireland 231 (49 overs) in Mohali, India. **West Indies win by 44 runs.**
    - England 225 (49.4 overs); Bangladesh 227/8 (49 overs) in Chittagong, Bangladesh. **Bangladesh win by 2 wickets.**
      - Standings: India 7 points (4 matches), West Indies 6 (4), England 5 (5), South Africa 4 (3), Bangladesh 4 (4), Ireland 2 (4), Netherlands 0 (4).

==== Cycling ====
- UCI World Tour:
  - Paris–Nice, Stage 6: (gold) Tony Martin (GER) (HTC–Highroad) 33' 24" (silver) Bradley Wiggins (GBR) (Team Sky) + 20" (bronze) Richie Porte (AUS) (Saxo Bank–SunGard) + 29"
    - General classification (after stage 6): (1) Martin 24h 59' 47" (2) Andreas Klöden (GER) (Team RadioShack) + 36" (3) Wiggins + 39"
  - Tirreno–Adriatico, Stage 3: (gold) Juan José Haedo (ARG) (Saxo Bank–SunGard) 4h 39' 45" (silver) Tyler Farrar (USA) (Garmin–Cervélo) s.t. (bronze) Daniel Oss (ITA) (Liquigas–Cannondale) s.t.
    - General classification (after stage 3): (1) Farrar 9h 53' 51" (2) Haedo + 5" (3) Lars Boom (NED) (Rabobank) + 6"

==== Diving ====
- European Championships in Turin, Italy:
  - Men's 3 m springboard synchro: (gold) Evgeny Kuznetsov/Ilya Zakharov (RUS) 454.68 points (silver) Patrick Hausding/Stephan Feck (GER) 441.45 (bronze) Matthieu Rosset/Damien Cely (FRA) 425.37
  - Women's 1 m springboard: (gold) Tania Cagnotto (ITA) 312.05 points (silver) Nadezhda Bazhina (RUS) 288.75 (bronze) Anna Lindberg (SWE) 287.80
    - Cagnotto wins her third successive title in this event and her seventh title overall.

==== Equestrianism ====
- World Dressage Masters:
  - 4th competition in Palm Beach County, Florida (CDI 5*):
    - Grand Prix Spécial: (gold) Michał Rapcewicz (POL) on Randon (silver) Pierre Saint Jacques (USA) on Lucky Tiger (bronze) Shawna Harding (USA) on Come on
    - Grand Prix Freestyle: (gold) Steffen Peters (USA) on Ravel (silver) Tinne Vilhelmson-Silfven (SWE) on Favourit (bronze) Tina Konyot (USA) on Calecto V
      - Rankings (after 3 competitions): (1) Anja Plönzke (GER) 1660.5 points (2) Rapcewicz 1378.5 (3) Adelinde Cornelissen (NED) 900

==== Freestyle skiing ====
- World Cup in Åre, Sweden:
  - Men's Moguls: (gold) Alexandre Bilodeau (CAN) 26.17 points (silver) Guilbaut Colas (FRA) 25.80 (bronze) Mikaël Kingsbury (CAN) 25.36
    - Moguls standings (after 9 of 11 events): (1) Colas 661 points (2) Kingsbury 595 (3) Bilodeau 579
    - Overall standings: (1) Andreas Matt (AUT) 75 points (2) Colas 73 (3) Kingsbury & Qi Guangpu (CHN) 66
  - Women's Moguls: (gold) Hannah Kearney (USA) 26.33 points (silver) Jennifer Heil (CAN) 25.61 (bronze) Heather McPhie (USA) 25.08
    - Moguls standings (after 9 of 11 events): (1) Kearney 809 points (2) Heil 572 (3) Audrey Robichaud (CAN) 395
    - Overall standings: (1) Kearney 90 points (2) Heil 64 (3) Cheng Shuang (CHN) 63

==== Nordic combined ====
- World Cup in Lahti, Finland:
  - HS 130 / 10 km: (gold) Björn Kircheisen (GER) 25:28.6 (silver) Eric Frenzel (GER) 25:34.0 (bronze) Jason Lamy-Chappuis (FRA) 25:41.8
    - Standings (after 12 of 13 races): (1) Lamy-Chappuis 849 points (2) Mikko Kokslien (NOR) 641 (3) Felix Gottwald (AUT) 578
      - Lamy-Chappuis wins his second consecutive World Cup title.

==== Short track speed skating ====
- World Championships in Sheffield, Great Britain:
  - Women's 1500 m: (1) Katherine Reutter (USA) 2:33.978 (2) Park Seung-Hi (KOR) 2:34.218 (3) Cho Ha-Ri (KOR) 2:34.336
  - Men's 1500 m: (1) Noh Jin-Kyu (KOR) 2:18.291 (2) Charles Hamelin (CAN) 2:18.676 (3) Jeff Simon (USA) 2:18.725

==== Snowboarding ====
- World Cup in Bardonecchia, Italy:
  - Men's halfpipe: (gold) Nathan Johnstone (AUS) 28.7 points (silver) Johann Baisamy (FRA) 26.1 (bronze) Arthur Longo (FRA) 25.2
    - Halfpipe standings (after 5 of 6 events): (1) Johnstone 3060 points (2) Ryō Aono (JPN) 2800 (3) Zhang Yiwei (CHN) 1470
    - Freestyle overall standings: (1) Johnstone 3060 points (2) Aono 2800 (3) Clemens Schattschneider (AUT) 2508
  - Women's halfpipe: (gold) Holly Crawford (AUS) 24.7 points (silver) Mirabelle Thovex (FRA) 23.1 (bronze) Paulina Ligocka-Andrzejewska (POL) 21.6
    - Halfpipe standings (after 5 of 6 events): (1) Cai Xuetong (CHN) 3800 points (2) Crawford 3100 (3) Thovex 1950
    - Freestyle overall standings: (1) Cai 3800 points (2) Crawford 3100 (3) Thovex 1950

==== Speed skating ====
- World Single Distance Championships in Inzell, Germany:
  - Men's 1000 m: (1) Shani Davis (USA) 1:08.45 (2) Kjeld Nuis (NED) 1:08.67 (3) Stefan Groothuis (NED) 1:08.73
  - Women's 1500 m: (1) Ireen Wüst (NED) 1:54.80 (2) Diane Valkenburg (NED) 1:56.27 (3) Jorien Voorhuis (NED) 1:57.30
  - Men's 5000 m: (1) Bob de Jong (NED) 6:15.41 (2) Lee Seung-hoon (KOR) 6:17.45 (3) Ivan Skobrev (RUS) 6:17.47

=== March 10, 2011 (Thursday) ===
==== Cricket ====
- World Cup (team in **bold** advances to the quarter-finals):
  - Group A: **Sri Lanka** 327/6 (50 overs; Tillakaratne Dilshan 144, Upul Tharanga 133); Zimbabwe 188 (39 overs) in Kandy, Sri Lanka. **Sri Lanka win by 139 runs.**
    - Standings: Sri Lanka 7 points (5 matches), New Zealand, Pakistan 6 (4), Australia 5 (3), Zimbabwe, Canada 2 (4), Kenya 0 (4).

==== Cycling ====
- UCI World Tour:
  - Paris–Nice, Stage 5: (gold) Andreas Klöden (GER) (Team RadioShack) 4h 59' 00" (silver) Samuel Sánchez (ESP) (Euskaltel–Euskadi) s.t. (bronze) Matteo Carrara (ITA) (Vacansoleil–DCM) s.t.
    - General classification (after stage 5): (1) Klöden 24h 26' 13" (2) Sánchez + 4" (3) Carrara + 6"
  - Tirreno–Adriatico, Stage 2: (gold) Tyler Farrar (USA) (Garmin–Cervélo) 4h 56' 06" (silver) Alessandro Petacchi (ITA) (Lampre–ISD) s.t. (bronze) Juan José Haedo (ARG) (Saxo Bank–SunGard) s.t.
    - General classification (after stage 2): (1) Farrar 5h 14' 13" (2) Tom Leezer (NED) (Rabobank) + 1" (3) Lars Boom (NED) (Rabobank) + 1"

==== Darts ====
- Premier League, week 5 in Manchester, England:
  - Terry Jenkins (ENG) 8–4 Mark Webster (WAL)
  - Phil Taylor (ENG) 8–6 Gary Anderson (SCO)
  - James Wade (ENG) 2–8 Raymond van Barneveld (NED)
  - Simon Whitlock (AUS) 2–8 Adrian Lewis (ENG)
    - Standings (after 5 matches): Anderson, Taylor 8 points, van Barneveld 6, Lewis, Webster, Whitlock, Jenkins 4, Wade 2.

==== Diving ====
- European Championships in Turin, Italy:
  - Men's 3 m springboard: (gold) Patrick Hausding (GER) 499.40 points (silver) Ilya Zakharov (RUS) 493.85 (bronze) Evgeny Kuznetsov (RUS) 482.35
  - Women's 10 m platform synchro: (gold) Yulia Koltunova/Daria Govor (RUS) 322.26 points (silver) Nora Subschinski/Christin Steuer (GER) 317.76 (bronze) Iuliia Prokopchuk/Alina Chaplenko (UKR) 315.24

==== Football (soccer) ====
- UEFA Europa League Round of 16, first leg:
  - CSKA Moscow (Russia) 0–1 (Portugal) Porto
  - PSV Eindhoven (Netherlands) 0–0 (Scotland) Rangers
  - Bayer Leverkusen (Germany) 2–3 (Spain) Villarreal
  - Braga (Portugal) 1–0 (England) Liverpool
  - Benfica (Portugal) 2–1 (France) Paris Saint-Germain
  - Dynamo Kyiv (Ukraine) 2–0 (England) Manchester City
  - Twente (Netherlands) 3–0 (Russia) Zenit St. Petersburg
  - Ajax (Netherlands) 0–1 (Russia) Spartak Moscow
- Copa Libertadores second stage:
  - Group 4: Unión Española (Chile) 2–1 (Argentina) Vélez Sársfield
    - Standings (after 3 matches): (Venezuela) Caracas 6 points, (Chile) Universidad Católica, Unión Española 4, Vélez Sársfield 3.
  - Group 5: Cerro Porteño (Paraguay) 1–1 (Venezuela) Deportivo Táchira
    - Standings: Cerro Porteño 5 points (3 matches), (Chile) Colo-Colo 3 (2), (Brazil) Santos 2 (2), Deportivo Táchira 2 (3).
  - Group 8: Independiente (Argentina) 1–3 (Argentina) Godoy Cruz
    - Standings (after 3 matches): Godoy Cruz, (Uruguay) Peñarol 6 points, (Ecuador) LDU Quito, Independiente 3.

==== Speed skating ====
- World Single Distance Championships in Inzell, Germany:
  - Men's 1500 m: (1) Håvard Bøkko (NOR) 1:45.04 (2) Shani Davis (USA) 1:45.09 (3) Lucas Makowsky (CAN) 1:45.22
  - Women's 3000 m: (1) Ireen Wüst (NED) 4:01.56 (2) Martina Sáblíková (CZE) 4:02.07 (3) Stephanie Beckert (GER) 4:04.28

=== March 9, 2011 (Wednesday) ===
==== Basketball ====
- U.S. college conference championship games:
  - Men's (winners advance to the NCAA tournament):
    - Big Sky Conference in Greeley, Colorado: Northern Colorado 65, Montana 60
    - Northeast Conference in Brooklyn: Long Island 85, Robert Morris 82 (OT)

==== Biathlon ====
- World Championships in Khanty-Mansiysk, Russia:
  - Women's individual: (gold) Helena Ekholm (SWE) 47:08.3 (0+0+0+0) (silver) Tina Bachmann (GER) 49:24.1 (0+2+0+0) (bronze) Vita Semerenko (UKR) 50:00.4 (1+0+0+2)
    - Ekholm wins her second individual world title, and third overall.
    - Final World Cup individual standings: (1) Ekholm 173 points (2) Valj Semerenko (UKR) 159 (3) Olga Zaitseva (RUS) 138
    - World Cup overall standings (after 22 of 26 races): (1) Kaisa Mäkäräinen (FIN) & Ekholm 871 points (3) Andrea Henkel (GER) 817

==== Cricket ====
- World Cup:
  - Group B: Netherlands 189 (46.4 overs); India 191/5 (36.3 overs) in New Delhi, India. **India win by 5 wickets.**
    - Standings: India 7 points (4 matches), England 5 (4), West Indies, South Africa 4 (3), Ireland, Bangladesh 2 (3), Netherlands 0 (4).

==== Cycling ====
- UCI World Tour:
  - Paris–Nice, Stage 4: (gold) Thomas Voeckler (FRA) (Team Europcar) 5h 04' 20" (silver) Rémi Pauriol (FRA) (FDJ) s.t. (bronze) Thomas De Gendt (BEL) (Vacansoleil–DCM) s.t.
    - General classification (after stage 4): (1) De Gendt 19h 26' 46" (2) Voeckler + 10" (3) Pauriol + 16"
  - Tirreno–Adriatico, Stage 1: (gold) Rabobank 18' 08" (silver) Garmin–Cervélo + 9" (bronze) HTC–Highroad + 10"
    - General classification: (1) Lars Boom (NED) (Rabobank) 18' 08" (2) Sebastian Langeveld (NED) (Rabobank) + 0" (3) Robert Gesink (NED) (Rabobank) + 0"

==== Diving ====
- European Championships in Turin, Italy:
  - Men's 1 m springboard: (gold) Evgeny Kuznetsov (RUS) 427.05 points (silver) Illya Kvasha (UKR) 419.65 (bronze) Matthieu Rosset (FRA) 412.15
  - Women's 10 m platform: (gold) Noemi Batki (ITA) 346.50 points (silver) Yulia Koltunova (RUS) 327.30 (bronze) Maria Kurjo (GER) 318.45

==== Football (soccer) ====
- UEFA Champions League Round of 16, second leg (first leg score in parentheses):
  - **Tottenham Hotspur** (England) 0–0 (1–0) (Italy) Milan. Tottenham Hotspur win 1–0 on aggregate.
    - Tottenham's Harry Redknapp becomes the first English manager in the Champions League quarterfinals.
  - **Schalke 04** (Germany) 3–1 (1–1) (Spain) Valencia. Schalke 04 win 4–2 on aggregate.
- Copa Libertadores second stage:
  - Group 2: Oriente Petrolero (Bolivia) 1–2 (Colombia) Junior
    - Standings (after 3 matches): Junior 9 points, (Brazil) Grêmio 6, (Peru) León de Huánuco 3, Oriente Petrolero 0.
  - Group 4: Universidad Católica (Chile) 1–3 (Venezuela) Caracas
    - Standings: Caracas 6 points (3 matches), Universidad Católica 4 (3), (Argentina) Vélez Sársfield 3 (2), (Chile) Unión Española 1 (2).
  - Group 7: Guaraní (Paraguay) 1–2 (Argentina) Estudiantes
    - Standings (after 3 matches): (Brazil) Cruzeiro 7 points, Estudiantes 6, (Colombia) Deportes Tolima 4, Guaraní 0.
  - Group 8: Peñarol (Uruguay) 1–0 (Ecuador) LDU Quito
    - Standings: Peñarol 6 points (3 matches), LDU Quito 3 (3), (Argentina) Independiente, (Argentina) Godoy Cruz 3 (2).

==== Surfing ====
- Men's World Tour:
  - Quiksilver Pro at Gold Coast, Australia: (1) Kelly Slater (USA) (2) Taj Burrow (AUS) (3) Tiago Pires (POR) & Jordy Smith (RSA)

=== March 8, 2011 (Tuesday) ===
==== Basketball ====
- U.S. college conference championship games:
  - Men's (winners advance to the NCAA tournament):
    - Horizon League in Milwaukee: Butler 59, Milwaukee 44
    - The Summit League in Sioux Falls, South Dakota: Oakland 90, Oral Roberts 76
    - Sun Belt Conference in Hot Springs, Arkansas: Arkansas–Little Rock 64, North Texas 63
  - Women's (winners advance to the NCAA tournament):
    - Big East Conference in Hartford, Connecticut: Connecticut 73, Notre Dame 64
    - The Summit League in Sioux Falls, South Dakota: South Dakota State 61, Oakland 54
    - Sun Belt Conference in Hot Springs, Arkansas: Arkansas–Little Rock 66, Western Kentucky 59
- In another college men's game:
  - Princeton 70, Penn 58 — Princeton ties Harvard for the Ivy League regular-season title and forces a one-game playoff for the league's automatic berth on March 12 at Yale.

==== Biathlon ====
- World Championships in Khanty-Mansiysk, Russia:
  - Men's individual: (gold) Tarjei Bø (NOR) 48:29.9 (0+0+1+0) (silver) Maxim Maksimov (RUS) 49:09.9 (0+0+0+0) (bronze) Christoph Sumann (AUT) 49:15.4 (0+0+0+1)
    - Bø wins his first individual world title, and second overall.
    - Final World Cup individual standings: (1) Emil Hegle Svendsen (NOR) 188 points (2) Bø 172 (3) Martin Fourcade (FRA) 133
    - World Cup overall standings (after 22 of 26 races): (1) Bø 979 points (2) Svendsen 887 (3) Fourcade 869

==== Cricket ====
- World Cup:
  - Group A: New Zealand 302/7 (50 overs; Ross Taylor 131*); Pakistan 192 (41.4 overs) in Kandy, Sri Lanka. **New Zealand win by 110 runs.**
    - Standings: New Zealand, Pakistan 6 points (4 matches), Sri Lanka 5 (4), Australia 5 (3), Zimbabwe 2 (3), Canada 2 (4), Kenya 0 (4).

==== Cycling ====
- UCI World Tour:
  - Paris–Nice, Stage 3: (gold) Matthew Goss (AUS) (HTC–Highroad) 5h 16' 48" (silver) Heinrich Haussler (AUS) (Garmin–Cervélo) s.t. (bronze) Denis Galimzyanov (RUS) (Team Katusha) s.t.
    - General classification (after stage 3): (1) Goss 14h 22' 34" (2) Thomas De Gendt (BEL) (Vacansoleil–DCM) + 2" (3) Haussler + 6"

==== Diving ====
- European Championships in Turin, Italy:
  - Team event: (gold) Yulia Koltunova/Ilya Zakharov (RUS) 411.00 points (silver) Audrey Labeau/Matthieu Rosset (FRA) 408.60 (bronze) Olena Federova/Oleksandr Gorshkovozov (UKR) 358.40

==== Football (soccer) ====
- UEFA Champions League Round of 16, second leg (first leg score in parentheses):
  - **Shakhtar Donetsk** (Ukraine) 3–0 (3–2) (Italy) Roma. Shakhtar Donetsk win 6–2 on aggregate.
  - **Barcelona** (Spain) 3–1 (1–2) (England) Arsenal. Barcelona win 4–3 on aggregate.
- Copa Libertadores second stage:
  - Group 1: Libertad (Paraguay) 5–1 (Peru) Universidad San Martín
    - Standings (after 3 matches): Libertad 7 points, Universidad San Martín 6, (Colombia) Once Caldas 2, (Mexico) San Luis 1.
  - Group 6: Chiapas (Mexico) 2–1 (Ecuador) Emelec
    - Standings: Jaguares 6 points (3 matches), (Brazil) Internacional 4 (2), Emelec 4 (3), (Bolivia) Jorge Wilstermann 0 (2).

==== Surfing ====
- Women's World Tour:
  - Roxy Pro at Gold Coast, Australia: (1) Carissa Moore (USA) (2) Tyler Wright (AUS) (3) Laura Enever (AUS) & Sally Fitzgibbons (AUS)

=== March 7, 2011 (Monday) ===
==== Basketball ====
- U.S. college conference championship games:
  - Men's (winners advance to the NCAA tournament):
    - Colonial Athletic Association in Richmond, Virginia: Old Dominion 70, Virginia Commonwealth 65
    - MAAC in Bridgeport, Connecticut: Saint Peter's 62, Iona 57
    - Southern Conference in Chattanooga, Tennessee: Wofford 77, College of Charleston 67
    - West Coast Conference in Paradise, Nevada: Gonzaga 75, Saint Mary's 63
  - Women's (winners advance to the NCAA tournament):
    - Atlantic 10 Conference in Lowell, Massachusetts: Xavier 67, Dayton 60
    - MAAC in Bridgeport, Connecticut: Marist 63, Loyola–Maryland 45
    - Southern Conference in Chattanooga, Tennessee: Samford 57, Appalachian State 54
    - West Coast Conference in Paradise, Nevada: Gonzaga 72, Saint Mary's 46

==== Cricket ====
- World Cup:
  - Group A: Kenya 198 (50 overs); Canada 199/5 (45.3 overs) in New Delhi, India. **Canada win by 5 wickets.**
    - Standings: Pakistan 6 points (3 matches), Sri Lanka 5 (4), Australia 5 (3), New Zealand 4 (3), Zimbabwe 2 (3), Canada 2 (4), Kenya 0 (4).

==== Cycling ====
- UCI World Tour:
  - Paris–Nice, Stage 2: (gold) Greg Henderson (NZL) (Team Sky) 5h 00' 56" (silver) Matthew Goss (AUS) (HTC–Highroad) s.t. (bronze) Denis Galimzyanov (RUS) (Team Katusha) s.t.
    - General classification (after stage 2): (1) Thomas De Gendt (BEL) (Vacansoleil–DCM) 9h 05' 48" (2) Henderson + 4" (3) Jérémy Roy (FRA) (FDJ) + 7"

=== March 6, 2011 (Sunday) ===
==== Alpine skiing ====
- Women's World Cup in Tarvisio, Italy:
  - Super-G: (gold) Lindsey Vonn (USA) 1:21.75 (silver) Julia Mancuso (USA) 1:21.98 (bronze) Maria Riesch (GER) 1:22.25
    - Super-G standings (after 6 of 7 races): (1) Vonn 560 points (2) Riesch 389 (3) Mancuso 315
      - Vonn secures her third discipline title in as many days, for her third consecutive Super-G World Cup title and the ninth discipline title of her career.
    - Overall standings (after 29 of 35 races): (1) Riesch 1676 points (2) Vonn 1580 (3) Elisabeth Görgl (AUT) & Tina Maze (SLO) 893
- Men's World Cup in Kranjska Gora, Slovenia:
  - Slalom: (gold) Mario Matt (AUT) 1:49.14 (53.93 / 55.21) (silver) Nolan Kasper (USA) 1:49.23 (54.06 / 55.17) (silver) Axel Bäck (SWE) 1:49.23 (53.70 / 55.53)
    - Slalom standings (after 9 of 10 races): (1) Ivica Kostelić (CRO) 478 points (2) Jean-Baptiste Grange (FRA) 442 (3) André Myhrer (SWE) 383
    - Overall standings (after 31 of 38 races): (1) Kostelić 1307 points (2) Didier Cuche (SUI) 725 (3) Aksel Lund Svindal (NOR) 722

==== Athletics ====
- European Indoor Championships in Paris:
  - Women's long jump: (gold) Darya Klishina (RUS) 6.80 m (silver) Naide Gomes (POR) 6.79 m (bronze) Yuliya Pidluzhnaya (RUS) 6.75 m
  - Women's pole vault: (gold) Anna Rogowska (POL) 4.85 m (silver) Silke Spiegelburg (GER) 4.75 m (bronze) Kristina Gadschiew (GER) 4.65 m
  - Men's heptathlon: (gold) Andrei Krauchanka (BLR) 6282 points (silver) Nadir El Fassi (FRA) 6237 (bronze) Roman Šebrle (CZE) 6178
  - Women's 3000 m: (gold) Helen Clitheroe (GBR) 8:56.66 (silver) Olesya Syreva (RUS) 8:56.69 (bronze) Lidia Chojecka (POL) 8:58.30
  - Women's high jump: (gold) Antonietta Di Martino (ITA) 2.01 m (silver) Ruth Beitia (ESP) 1.96 m (bronze) Ebba Jungmark (SWE) 1.96 m
  - Men's 800 m: (gold) Adam Kszczot (POL) 1:47.87 (silver) Marcin Lewandowski (POL) 1:48.23 (bronze) Kevin López (ESP) 1:48.35
  - Women's 800 m: (gold) Yevgeniya Zinurova (RUS) 2:00.19 (silver) Jenny Meadows (GBR) 2:00.50 (bronze) Yuliya Rusanova (RUS) 2:00.80
  - Men's 1500 m: (gold) Manuel Olmedo (ESP) 3:41.03 (silver) Kemal Koyuncu (TUR) 3:41.18 (bronze) Bartosz Nowicki (POL) 3:41.48
  - Men's triple jump: (gold) Teddy Tamgho (FRA) 17.92 m (WR) (silver) Fabrizio Donato (ITA) 17.73 m (bronze) Marian Oprea (ROM) 17.62 m
  - Women's 60 m: (gold) Olesya Povh (UKR) 7.13 (silver) Mariya Ryemyen (UKR) 7.15 (bronze) Ezinne Okparaebo (NOR) 7.20
  - Men's 60 m: (gold) Francis Obikwelu (POR) 6.53 (silver) Dwain Chambers (GBR) 6.54 (bronze) Christophe Lemaitre (FRA) 6.58
  - Women's 4 × 400 m relay: (gold) Russia (Ksenia Zadorina, Kseniya Vdovina, Yelena Migunova, Olesya Krasnomovets) 3:29.34 (silver) Great Britain (Kelly Sotherton, Lee McConnell, Marilyn Okoro, Jenny Meadows) 3:31.36 (bronze) France (Muriel Hurtis-Houairi, Laetitia Denis, Marie Gayot, Floria Gueï) 3:32.16
  - Men's 4 × 400 m relay: (gold) France (Marc Macedot, Leslie Djhone, Mamoudou Elimane Hanne, Yoann Décimus) 3:06.17 (silver) Great Britain (Nigel Levine, Nick Leavey, Richard Strachan, Richard Buck) 3:06.46 (bronze) Belgium (Jonathan Borlée, Antoine Gillet, Nils Duerinck, Kevin Borlée) 3:06.57

==== Auto racing ====
- Sprint Cup Series:
  - Kobalt Tools 400 in Las Vegas, Nevada: (1) (Missouri) Carl Edwards (Ford; Roush Fenway Racing) (2) (Indiana) Tony Stewart (Chevrolet; Stewart Haas Racing) (3) (Colombia) Juan Pablo Montoya (Chevrolet; Earnhardt Ganassi Racing)
    - Drivers' championship standings (after 3 of 36 races): (1) Stewart & (Nevada) Kurt Busch (Dodge; Penske Racing) 113 points (3) Edwards & Montoya 106
- World Rally Championship:
  - Rally México in León, Mexico: (1) Sébastien Loeb (FRA)/Daniel Elena (MON) (Citroën DS3 WRC) 3:53:17.0 (2) Mikko Hirvonen (FIN)/Jarmo Lehtinen (FIN) (Ford Fiesta RS WRC) 3:54:55.4 (3) Jari-Matti Latvala (FIN)/Miikka Anttila (FIN) (Ford Fiesta RS WRC) 3:55:40.9
    - Drivers' championship standings (after 2 of 13 rallies): (1) Hirvonen 46 points (2) Loeb 37 (3) Latvala 31

==== Basketball ====
- Americas League Final Four in Veracruz, Mexico:
  - Regatas Corrientes (Argentina) 89–73 (Puerto Rico) Capitanes de Arecibo
  - Halcones UV Xalapa (Mexico) 87–81 (Mexico) Halcones Rojos
    - Final standings: Regatas Corrientes, Capitanes de Arecibo 2–1; Halcones UV Xalapa, Halcones Rojos 1–2.
      - Regatas win the title for the first time.
- U.S. college conference championship games:
  - Men's (winner advances to the NCAA tournament):
    - Missouri Valley Conference in St. Louis: Indiana State 60, Missouri State 56
  - Women's (winners advance to the NCAA tournament):
    - Atlantic Coast Conference in Greensboro, North Carolina: Duke 81, North Carolina 66
    - Big Ten Conference in Indianapolis: Ohio State 84, Penn State 70
    - Southeastern Conference in Nashville, Tennessee: Tennessee 90, Kentucky 65
- (Greece) Greek Cup Final: Olympiacos – Panathinaikos postponed due to safety concerns

==== Biathlon ====
- World Championships in Khanty-Mansiysk, Russia:
  - Men's pursuit: (gold) Martin Fourcade (FRA) 33:02.6 (0+1+2+0) (silver) Emil Hegle Svendsen (NOR) 33:06.4 (0+0+1+1) (bronze) Tarjei Bø (NOR) 33:07.8 (0+0+1+1)
    - Fourcade becomes the first Frenchman to win a world title since Raphaël Poirée in 2007.
    - World Cup pursuit standings (after 6 of 7 races): (1) Bø 280 points (2) Fourcade 272 (3) Svendsen 244
    - World Cup overall standings (after 21 of 26 races): (1) Bø 919 points (2) Svendsen 844 (3) Fourcade 838
  - Women's pursuit: (gold) Kaisa Mäkäräinen (FIN) 30:00.1 (0+0+0+0) (silver) Magdalena Neuner (GER) 30:21.7 (0+0+0+2) (bronze) Helena Ekholm (SWE) 31:43.7 (0+0+0+0)
    - Mäkäräinen becomes the first Finnish woman to win a world title.
    - World Cup pursuit standings (after 6 of 7 races): (1) Mäkäräinen 300 points (2) Andrea Henkel (GER) 255 (3) Ekholm 254
    - World Cup overall standings (after 21 of 26 races): (1) Mäkäräinen 858 points (2) Henkel 817 (3) Ekholm 811

==== Cricket ====
- World Cup:
  - Group B:
    - England 171 (45.4 overs); South Africa 165 (47.4 overs) in Chennai, India. **England win by 6 runs.**
    - Ireland 207 (47.5 overs; Yuvraj Singh 5/31); India 210/5 (46 overs) in Bangalore, India. **India win by 5 wickets.**
      - Standings: India 5 points (3 matches), England 5 (4), West Indies, South Africa 4 (3), Ireland, Bangladesh 2 (3), Netherlands 0 (3).

==== Cross-country skiing ====
- Nordic World Ski Championships in Oslo, Norway:
  - Men's 50 km freestyle: (gold) Petter Northug (NOR) 2:08:09.0 (silver) Maxim Vylegzhanin (RUS) 2:08:10.7 (bronze) Tord Asle Gjerdalen (NOR) 2:08:15.3
    - Northug wins his third title of the championships and seventh overall.

==== Cycling ====
- UCI World Tour:
  - Paris–Nice, Stage 1: (gold) Thomas De Gendt (BEL) (Vacansoleil–DCM) 4h 05' 06" (silver) Jérémy Roy (FRA) (FDJ) s.t. (bronze) Heinrich Haussler (AUS) (Garmin–Cervélo) s.t.
    - General classification: (1) De Gendt 4h 04' 53" (2) Roy + 6" (3) Haussler + 9"

==== Freestyle skiing ====
- World Cup in Meiringen–Hasliberg, Switzerland:
  - Men's ski cross: (gold) Jouni Pellinen (FIN) (silver) Andreas Matt (AUT) (bronze) Daniel Bohnacker (GER)
    - ski cross standings (after 9 of 11 events): (1) Matt 679 points (2) Christopher Del Bosco (CAN) 435 (3) Pellinen 377
    - Overall standings: (1) Matt 75 points (2) Guilbaut Colas (FRA) 73 (3) Mikaël Kingsbury (CAN) 67
  - Women's ski cross: (gold) Anna Holmlund (SWE) (silver) Katrin Müller (SUI) (bronze) Ophélie David (FRA)
    - ski cross standings (after 9 of 11 events): (1) Heidi Zacher (GER) 517 points (2) Holmlund 472 (3) Kelsey Serwa (CAN) 450
    - Overall standings: (1) Hannah Kearney (USA) 89 points (2) Cheng Shuang (CHN) 63 (3) Jennifer Heil (CAN) 62

==== Golf ====
- PGA Tour:
  - The Honda Classic in Palm Beach Gardens, Florida:
    - Winner: Rory Sabbatini (RSA) 271 (−9)
      - Sabbatini wins his sixth PGA Tour title and first since May 2009.

==== Speed skating ====
- World Cup Final in Heerenveen, Netherlands:
  - 500 m women (race 2): (gold) Jenny Wolf (GER) 38.37 (silver) Lee Sang-hwa (KOR) 38.48 (bronze) Annette Gerritsen (NED) 38.55
    - Final standings: (1) Wolf 1190 points (2) Lee 875 (3) Margot Boer (NED) 735
  - 500 m men (race 2): (gold) Lee Kyou-hyuk (KOR) 35.00 (silver) Yūya Oikawa (JPN) 35.11 (bronze) Lee Kang-Seok (KOR) 35.12
    - Final standings: (1) Lee Kang-Seok 845 points (2) Lee Kyou-hyuk 745 (3) Joji Kato (JPN) 671
  - 1000 m women: (gold) Ireen Wüst (NED) 1:15.76 (silver) Marrit Leenstra (NED) 1:16.19 (bronze) Laurine van Riessen (NED) 1:16.37
    - Final standings: (1) Heather Richardson (USA) 605 points (2) Christine Nesbitt (CAN) 590 (3) Margot Boer (NED) 360
  - 1000 m men: (gold) Stefan Groothuis (NED) 1:08.66 (silver) Lee Kyou-hyuk 1:09.00 (bronze) Shani Davis (USA) 1:09.21
    - Final standings: (1) Groothuis 580 points (2) Lee Kyou-hyuk 522 (3) Davis 485
  - Mass start men: (gold) Jorrit Bergsma (NED) (silver) Rob Hadders (NED) (bronze) Bob de Jong (NED)

==== Tennis ====
- Davis Cup World Group first round (winners advance to the quarterfinals):
  - **Serbia** 4–1 India
    - Viktor Troicki (SRB) def. Somdev Devvarman (IND) 6–4, 6–2, 7–5
    - Janko Tipsarević (SRB) def. Karan Rastogi (IND) 6–0, 6–1
  - **Sweden** 3–2 Russia
    - Dmitry Tursunov (RUS) def. Simon Aspelin (SWE) 7–5, 6–2
    - Igor Andreev (RUS) def. Joachim Johansson (SWE) 7–6(8), 6–4
  - Czech Republic 2–3 **Kazakhstan**
    - Andrey Golubev (KAZ) def. Tomáš Berdych (CZE) 7–5, 5–7, 6–4, 6–2
    - Mikhail Kukushkin (KAZ) def. Jan Hájek (CZE) 6–4, 6–7(4), 7–6(8), 6–0
  - **Argentina** 4–1 Romania
    - Eduardo Schwank (ARG) def. Victor Crivoi (ROU) 7–6(3), 6–2
    - Adrian Ungur (ROU) def. Juan Mónaco (ARG) 6–4, 2–6, 6–3
  - Chile 1–4 **United States**
    - Andy Roddick (USA) def. Paul Capdeville (CHI) 3–6, 7–6(2), 6–3, 6–3
    - John Isner (USA) def. Guillermo Rivera Aránguiz (CHI) 6–3, 6–7(4), 7–5
  - Belgium 1–4 **Spain**
    - Rafael Nadal (ESP) def. Olivier Rochus (BEL) 6–4, 6–2
    - Steve Darcis (BEL) def. Feliciano López (ESP) 6–7(4), 7–6(6), 7–6(3)
  - Croatia 2–3 **Germany**
    - Marin Čilić (CRO) def. Philipp Kohlschreiber (GER) 6–2, 6–3, 7–6(6)
    - Philipp Petzschner (GER) def. Ivo Karlović (CRO) 6–4, 7–6(3), 7–6(5)
  - Austria 2–3 **France**
    - Jürgen Melzer (AUT) def. Gilles Simon (FRA) 7–6(7), 3–6, 1–6, 6–4, 6–0
    - Jérémy Chardy (FRA) def. Martin Fischer (AUT) 2–6, 7–6(4), 6–3, 6–3
- WTA Tour:
  - Monterrey Open in Monterrey, Mexico:
    - Final: **Anastasia Pavlyuchenkova** (RUS) def. Jelena Janković (SRB) 2–6, 6–2, 6–3
      - Pavlyuchenkova wins her third career title.
  - Malaysian Open in Kuala Lumpur, Malaysia:
    - Final: **Jelena Dokić** (AUS) def. Lucie Šafářová (CZE) 2–6, 7–6(9), 6–4
      - Dokić wins the sixth title of her career, and the first title since winning Birmingham in 2002.

=== March 5, 2011 (Saturday) ===
==== Alpine skiing ====
- Women's World Cup in Tarvisio, Italy:
  - Downhill: (gold) Anja Pärson (SWE) 1:26.91 (silver) Lindsey Vonn (USA) 1:27.64 (bronze) Elisabeth Görgl (AUT) 1:28.08
    - Downhill standings (after 7 of 8 races): (1) Vonn 600 points (2) Maria Riesch (GER) 457 (3) Görgl 273
      - Vonn secures her second discipline title in as many days, for her fourth consecutive downhill World Cup title and the eighth discipline title of her career.
    - Overall standings (after 28 of 35 races): (1) Riesch 1616 points (2) Vonn 1480 (3) Tina Maze (SLO) 857
- Men's World Cup in Kranjska Gora, Slovenia:
  - Giant slalom: (gold) Carlo Janka (SUI) 2:27.05 (1:12.83 / 1:14.22) (silver) Alexis Pinturault (FRA) 2:27.07 (1:14.17 / 1:12.90) (bronze) Ted Ligety (USA) 2:27.17 (1:12.90 / 1:14.27)
    - Giant slalom standings (after 6 of 7 races): (1) Ligety 383 points (2) Aksel Lund Svindal (NOR) 306 (3) Cyprien Richard (FRA) 303
    - Overall standings (after 30 of 38 races): (1) Ivica Kostelić (CRO) 1307 points (2) Didier Cuche (SUI) 725 (3) Svindal 722

==== Athletics ====
- European Indoor Championships in Paris:
  - Shot put women: (gold) Anna Avdeyeva (RUS) 18.70 m (silver) Christina Schwanitz (GER) 18.65 m (bronze) Josephine Terlecki (GER) 18.09 m
  - High jump men: (gold) Ivan Ukhov (RUS) 2.38 m (silver) Jaroslav Bába (CZE) 2.34 m (bronze) Aleksandr Shustov (RUS) 2.34 m
  - Triple jump women: (gold) Simona La Mantia (ITA) 14.60 m (silver) Olesya Zabara (RUS) 14.45 m (bronze) Dana Velďáková (SVK) 14.39 m
  - Pole vault men: (gold) Renaud Lavillenie (FRA) 6.03 m (CR) (silver) Jérôme Clavier (FRA) 5.76 m (bronze) Malte Mohr (GER) 5.71 m
  - Long jump men: (gold) Sebastian Bayer (GER) 8.16 m (silver) Kafétien Gomis (FRA) 8.03 m (bronze) Morten Jensen (DEN) 8.00 m
  - 3000 m men: (gold) Mo Farah (GBR) 7:53.00 (silver) Hayle Ibrahimov (AZE) 7:53.32 (bronze) Halil Akkaş (TUR) 7:54.19
  - 1500 m women: (gold) Elena Arzhakova (RUS) 4:13.78 (silver) Nuria Fernández (ESP) 4:14.04 (bronze) Yekaterina Martynova (RUS) 4:14.16
  - 400 m women: (gold) Denisa Rosolová (CZE) 51.73 (silver) Olesya Krasnomovets (RUS) 51.80 (bronze) Ksenia Zadorina (RUS) 52.03
  - 400 m men: (gold) Leslie Djhone (FRA) 45.54 (silver) Thomas Schneider (GER) 46.42 (bronze) Richard Buck (GBR) 46.62

==== Auto racing ====
- Nationwide Series:
  - Sam's Town 300 in Las Vegas, Nevada: (1) (Arkansas) Mark Martin (Chevrolet; Turner Motorsports) (2) (Illinois) Justin Allgaier (Chevrolet; Turner Motorsports) (3) (Michigan) Brad Keselowski (Dodge; Penske Racing)
    - Martin wins his record-extending 49th race in the series. Fourth-placed Danica Patrick (Chevrolet; JR Motorsports) records the highest finish by a female driver in a national NASCAR series.
    - Drivers' championship standings (after 3 of 34 races): (1) (Georgia (U.S. state)) Reed Sorenson (Chevrolet; Turner Motorsports) 111 points (2) (Mississippi) Ricky Stenhouse Jr. (Ford; Roush Fenway Racing) 109 (3) (California) Jason Leffler (Chevrolet; Turner Motorsports) 106

==== Basketball ====
- Americas League Final Four in Veracruz, Mexico:
  - Regatas Corrientes (Argentina) 70–74 (Mexico) Halcones Rojos
  - Capitanes de Arecibo (Puerto Rico) 75–67 (Mexico) Halcones UV Xalapa
    - Standings: Capitanes de Arecibo 2–0; Halcones Rojos, Regatas Corrientes 1–1; Halcones UV Xalapa 0–2.
- U.S. college conference championship games:
  - Men's (winners advance to the NCAA tournament):
    - Atlantic Sun Conference in Macon, Georgia: Belmont 87, North Florida 46
    - Big South Conference in Conway, South Carolina: UNC Asheville 60, Coastal Carolina 47
    - Ohio Valley Conference in Nashville, Tennessee: Morehead State 80, Tennessee Tech 73
  - Women's (winners advance to the NCAA tournament):
    - Atlantic Sun Conference in Macon, Georgia: Stetson 69, Jacksonville 50
    - Ohio Valley Conference in Nashville, Tennessee: UT–Martin 82, Tennessee Tech 76
- In another college men's game:
  - In the only conference that does not conduct a postseason tournament, the Ivy League, Harvard clinches at least a share of the title with a 79–67 win over Princeton. Harvard will win the title and the conference's automatic bid if Princeton loses to Penn on March 8. A Princeton win will result in a tie for the title, forcing a one-game playoff for the automatic bid.
- In another college women's game:
  - Princeton clinches the Ivy League title and an automatic berth with a 68–59 win over Harvard.

==== Biathlon ====
- World Championships in Khanty-Mansiysk, Russia:
  - Men's sprint: (gold) Arnd Peiffer (GER) 24:34.0 (0+1) (silver) Martin Fourcade (FRA) 24:47.0 (2+0) (bronze) Tarjei Bø (NOR) 24:59.2 (1+0)
    - Peiffer becomes the first German winner in men's sprint since Frank Luck in 1999.
    - World Cup sprint standings (after 9 of 10 races): (1) Bø 393 points (2) Emil Hegle Svendsen (NOR) 331 (3) Fourcade 301
    - World Cup overall standings (after 20 of 26 races): (1) Bø 871 points (2) Svendsen 790 (3) Fourcade 778
  - Women's sprint: (gold) Magdalena Neuner (GER) 20:31.2 (0+0) (silver) Kaisa Mäkäräinen (FIN) 20:43.4 (0+0) (bronze) Anastasiya Kuzmina (SVK) 21:11.2 (0+1)
    - Neuner wins her second sprint world title, and her eighth overall.
    - World Cup sprint standings (after 9 of 10 races): (1) Mäkäräinen 369 points (2) Neuner 344 (3) Helena Ekholm (SWE) 321
    - World Cup overall standings (after 20 of 26 races): (1) Mäkäräinen 798 points (2) Andrea Henkel (GER) 774 (3) Ekholm 763

==== Cricket ====
- World Cup:
  - Group A: Sri Lanka 146/3 (32.5 overs); Australia in Colombo, Sri Lanka. **No result, match abandoned due to rain.**
    - Standings: Pakistan 6 points (3 matches), Sri Lanka 5 (4), Australia 5 (3), New Zealand 4 (3), Zimbabwe 2 (3), Canada, Kenya 0 (3).

==== Cross-country skiing ====
- Nordic World Ski Championships in Oslo, Norway:
  - Women's 30 km freestyle: (gold) Therese Johaug (NOR) 1:23:45.1 (silver) Marit Bjørgen (NOR) 1:24:29.1 (bronze) Justyna Kowalczyk (POL) 1:25:19.1
    - Johaug wins her second title of the championships.
    - Bjørgen wins her fifth medal of the championships and the 14th of her career.

==== Equestrianism ====
- Show jumping:
  - FEI World Cup North American League – West Coast:
    - 15th competition in Thermal, California (CSI 2*-W): (gold) Lucy Davis (USA) on Nemo (silver) Saer Coulter (USA) on Springtime (bronze) Kirsten Coe (USA) on Tristan

==== Figure skating ====
- World Junior Championships in Gangneung, South Korea:
  - Men: (gold) Andrei Rogozine (CAN) 200.13 (silver) Keiji Tananka (JPN) 196.98 (bronze) Alexander Majorov (SWE) 195.71
    - Rogozine becomes the first Canadian men's champion since 1978.
  - Ladies: (gold) Adelina Sotnikova (RUS) 174.96 points (silver) Elizaveta Tuktamysheva (RUS) 169.11 (bronze) Agnes Zawadzki (USA) 161.07

==== Mixed martial arts ====
- Strikeforce: Feijao vs. Henderson in Columbus, Ohio, United States:
  - Light heavyweight championship bout: **Dan Henderson** (USA) def. Rafael Cavalcante (BRA) (c) by KO (punch)
  - Women's welterweight championship bout: **Marloes Coenen** (NED) (c) def. Liz Carmouche (USA) by submission (triangle choke)
  - Middleweight bout: **Tim Kennedy** (USA) def. Melvin Manhoef (NED) by submission (rear naked choke)
  - Lightweight bout: **Jorge Masvidal** (USA) def. Billy Evangelista (USA) by unanimous decision (30–27, 30–27, 30–27)

==== Ski jumping ====
- Nordic World Ski Championships in Oslo, Norway:
  - Team large hill: (gold) Austria (Gregor Schlierenzauer, Martin Koch, Andreas Kofler, Thomas Morgenstern) 500.0 points (silver) Norway (Anders Jacobsen, Johan Remen Evensen, Anders Bardal, Tom Hilde) 456.4 (bronze) Slovenia (Peter Prevc, Jurij Tepeš, Jernej Damjan, Robert Kranjec) 452.6
    - The Austrian quartet repeat their small hill victory, completing a clean sweep in the ski jumping programme. Koch and Kofler both win their second title at the championships and third overall. Schlierenzauer and Morgenstern win their third title of the championships, respectively winning their fifth and seventh titles overall.

==== Snowboarding ====
- World Cup in Moscow, Russia:
  - Men's parallel slalom: (gold) Roland Fischnaller (ITA) (silver) Rok Marguč (SLO) (bronze) Simon Schoch (SUI)
    - Parallel slalom standings (after 8 of 10 races): (1) Benjamin Karl (AUT) 5210 points (2) Fischnaller 4400 (3) Andreas Prommegger (AUT) 3940
    - Overall standings: (1) Karl 5210 points (2) Fischnaller 4400 (3) Prommegger 3940
  - Women's parallel slalom: (gold) Yekaterina Tudegesheva (RUS) (silver) Tomoka Takeuchi (JPN) (bronze) Doris Günther (AUT)
    - Parallel slalom standings (after 8 of 10 races): (1) Tudegesheva 5890 points (2) Fränzi Mägert-Kohli (SUI) 4410 (3) Marion Kreiner (AUT) 3690
    - Overall standings: (1) Tudegesheva 5890 points (2) Mägert-Kohli 4410 (3) Dominique Maltais (CAN) 3800

==== Speed skating ====
- World Cup Final in Heerenveen, Netherlands:
  - 500 m women (race 1): (gold) Annette Gerritsen (NED) 38.31 (silver) Jenny Wolf (GER) 38.37 (bronze) Lee Sang-hwa (KOR) 38.49
    - Standings (after 11 of 12 races): (1) Wolf 1040 points (2) Lee 755 (3) Margot Boer (NED) 645
  - 1500 m men: (gold) Shani Davis (USA) 1:45.92 (silver) Stefan Groothuis (NED) 1:46.09 (bronze) Ivan Skobrev (RUS) 1:46.59
    - Final standings: (1) Davis 440 points (2) Håvard Bøkko (NOR) 357 (3) Groothuis 342
  - 3000 m women: (gold) Martina Sáblíková (CZE) 4:06.21 (silver) Stephanie Beckert (GER) 4:08.03 (bronze) Jorien Voorhuis (NED) 4:08.96
    - Final standings: (1) Sáblíková 510 points (2) Beckert 475 (3) Jilleanne Rookard (USA) 351
  - Team sprint women: (gold) Team Friesland 1 (silver) Team NH/Utrecht (bronze) Team Zuid-Holland
  - Team sprint men: (gold) Team Zuid-Holland (silver) Team Overijssel (bronze) Team Friesland

==== Tennis ====
- Davis Cup World Group first round: (the winners advance to the quarterfinals)
  - Serbia 2–1 India
    - Ilija Bozoljac/Nenad Zimonjić (SRB) def. Rohan Bopanna/Somdev Devvarman (IND) 4–6, 6–3, 6–4, 7–6(10)
  - **Sweden** 3–0 Russia
    - Simon Aspelin/Robert Lindstedt (RUS) def. Igor Kunitsyn/Dmitry Tursunov (RUS) 6–4, 6–7(6), 7–6(6), 6–2
  - Czech Republic 2–1 Kazakhstan
    - Tomáš Berdych/Lukáš Dlouhý (CZE) def. Evgeny Korolev/Yuri Schukin (KAZ) 6–4, 6–4, 7–6(4)
  - **Argentina** 3–0 Romania
    - Juan Ignacio Chela/Eduardo Schwank (ARG) def. Victor Hănescu/Horia Tecău (ROU) 6–2, 7–6(8), 6–1
  - Chile 1–2 United States
    - Bob Bryan/Mike Bryan (USA) def. Jorge Aguilar/Nicolás Massú (CHI) 6–3, 6–3, 7–6(4)
  - Belgium 0–3 **Spain**
    - Feliciano López/Fernando Verdasco (ESP) def. Steve Darcis/Olivier Rochus (BEL) 7–6(0), 6–4, 6–3
  - Croatia 1–2 Germany
    - Christopher Kas/Philipp Petzschner (GER) def. Ivan Dodig/Ivo Karlović (CRO) 6–3, 3–6, 5–7, 6–3, 6–4
      - During the match, Karlović sets a new record for the fastest tennis serve, recording a serve of 251 km/h (156 mph), breaking the previous record of 249.4 km/h (155 mph) set by Andy Roddick in 2004.
  - Austria 1–2 France
    - Oliver Marach/Jürgen Melzer (AUT) def. Julien Benneteau/Michaël Llodra (FRA) 6–4, 3–6, 6–3, 6–4

=== March 4, 2011 (Friday) ===
==== Alpine skiing ====
- Women's World Cup in Tarvisio, Italy:
  - Super combined: (gold) Tina Maze (SLO) 2:13.54 (1:28.94 / 44.60) (silver) Lindsey Vonn (USA) 2:13.72 (1:28.15 / 45.57) (bronze) Maria Riesch (GER) 2:14.09 (1:28.57 / 45.52)
    - Final combined standings: (1) Vonn 220 points (2) Maze 212 (3) Riesch 205
      - Vonn retains her combined title, for the seventh discipline title of her career.
    - Overall standings (after 27 of 35 races): (1) Riesch 1576 points (2) Vonn 1400 (3) Maze 807

==== Athletics ====
- European Indoor Championships in Paris:
  - Shot put men: (gold) Ralf Bartels (GER) 21.16 m (silver) David Storl (GER) 20.75 m (bronze) Maksim Sidorov (RUS) 20.55 m
  - Pentathlon women: (gold) Antoinette Nana Djimou Ida (FRA) 4723 points (silver) Austra Skujytė (LTU) 4706 (bronze) Remona Fransen (NED) 4665
  - 60 m hurdles women: (gold) Carolin Nytra (GER) 7.80 (silver) Tiffany Ofili (GBR) 7.80 (bronze) Christina Vukicevic (NOR) 7.83
  - 60 m hurdles men: (gold) Petr Svoboda (CZE) 7.49 (silver) Garfield Darien (FRA) 7.56 (bronze) Adrien Deghelt (BEL) 7.57

==== Basketball ====
- Americas League Final Four in Veracruz, Mexico:
  - Halcones Rojos (Mexico) 68–70 (Puerto Rico) Capitanes de Arecibo
  - Halcones UV Xalapa (Mexico) 72–81 (Argentina) Regatas Corrientes

==== Cricket ====
- World Cup:
  - Group A: Zimbabwe 162 (46.2 overs); New Zealand 166/0 (33.3 overs) in Ahmedabad, India. **New Zealand win by 10 wickets.**
    - Standings: Pakistan 6 points (3 matches), Sri Lanka 4 (3), Australia 4 (2), New Zealand 4 (3), Zimbabwe 2 (3), Canada, Kenya 0 (3).
  - Group B: Bangladesh 58 (18.5 overs); West Indies 59/1 (12.2 overs) in Dhaka, Bangladesh. **West Indies win by 9 wickets.**
    - Bangladesh record their lowest One Day International total and the fourth-lowest World Cup total.
    - Standings: South Africa 4 points (2 matches), West Indies 4 (3), India 3 (2), England 3 (3), Ireland 2 (2), Bangladesh 2 (3), Netherlands 0 (3).

==== Cross-country skiing ====
- Nordic World Ski Championships in Oslo, Norway:
  - Men's 4 × 10 km relay: (gold) Norway (Martin Johnsrud Sundby, Eldar Rønning, Tord Asle Gjerdalen, Petter Northug) 1:40:10.2 (silver) Sweden (Daniel Rickardsson, Johan Olsson, Anders Södergren, Marcus Hellner) 1:40:11.5 (bronze) Germany (Jens Filbrich, Axel Teichmann, Franz Göring, Tobias Angerer) 1:40:15.9
    - Norway win the event for the sixth successive time and the 14th time overall. Rønning and Northug win their third successive titles in the event, with Northug winning his second title of the championships and sixth overall.

==== Equestrianism ====
- Show jumping:
  - FEI Nations Cup Promotional League – North and South American League:
    - Nations Cup of the United States in Wellington, Florida (CSIO 4*): (gold) United States (McLain Ward on Sapphire, Mario Deslauriers on Urico, Margie Engle on Indigo, Beezie Madden on Coral Reef Via Volo) (silver) Canada (Jonathon Millar on Contino, Yann Candele on Pitareusa, Ian Millar on Star Power, Eric Lamaze on Sidoline vd Centaur) (bronze) Ireland, Great Britain & Australia
      - Final standings: (1) Canada 18 points (2) Mexico 6 (3) Argentina 4

==== Figure skating ====
- World Junior Championships in Gangneung, South Korea:
  - Ladies short program: (1) Adelina Sotnikova (RUS) 59.51 points (2) Elizaveta Tuktamysheva (RUS) 58.60 (3) Christina Gao (USA) 56.80
  - Ice Dancing: (gold) Ksenia Monko/Kirill Khaliavin (RUS) 144.16 points (silver) Ekaterina Pushkash/Jonathan Guerreiro (RUS) 134.64 (bronze) Charlotte Lichtman/Dean Copely (USA) 133.36
    - Monko and Khaliavin win their first world title.

==== Nordic combined ====
- Nordic World Ski Championships in Oslo, Norway:
  - Team large hill/4 × 5 km: (gold) Austria (Bernhard Gruber, David Kreiner, Felix Gottwald, Mario Stecher) 47:12.3 (silver) Germany (Johannes Rydzek, Björn Kircheisen, Eric Frenzel, Tino Edelmann) 47:12.4 (bronze) Norway (Mikko Kokslien, Håvard Klemetsen, Jan Schmid, Magnus Moan) 47:52.9
    - Austria complete the team double at the championships, and win the event for the third time.

==== Speed skating ====
- World Cup Final in Heerenveen, Netherlands:
  - 500 m men (race 1): (gold) Lee Kang-Seok (KOR) 35.03 (silver) Lee Kyou-hyuk (KOR) 35.08 (bronze) Jacques de Koning (NED) 35.18
    - Standings (after 11 of 12 races): (1) Lee Kang-Seok 740 points (2) Joji Kato (JPN) 655 (3) Lee Kyou-hyuk 595
  - 1500 m women: (gold) Ireen Wüst (NED) 1:56.35 (silver) Marrit Leenstra (NED) 1:57.00 (bronze) Christine Nesbitt (CAN) 1:57.86
    - Final standings: (1) Nesbitt 575 points (2) Leenstra 466 (3) Wüst 460
  - 5000 m men: (gold) Bob de Jong (NED) 6:18.62 (silver) Ivan Skobrev (RUS) 6:22.50 (bronze) Bob de Vries (NED) 6:24.44
    - Final standings: (1) de Jong 610 points (2) Skobrev 400 (3) de Vries 356
  - Mass start women: (gold) Mariska Huisman (NED) (silver) Carla Zielman (NED) (bronze) Andrea Sikkema (NED)

==== Tennis ====
- Davis Cup World Group first round:
  - Serbia 1–1 India
    - Viktor Troicki (SRB) def. Rohan Bopanna (IND) 6–3, 6–3, 5–7, 3–6, 6–3
    - Somdev Devvarman (IND) def. Janko Tipsarević (SRB) 7–5, 7–5, 7–6(3)
  - Sweden 2–0 Russia
    - Robin Söderling (SWE) def. Igor Andreev (RUS) 6–3, 6–3, 6–1
    - Joachim Johansson (SWE) def. Teymuraz Gabashvili (RUS) 6–3, 7–6(4), 6–4
  - Czech Republic 1–1 Kazakhstan
    - Andrey Golubev (KAZ) def. Jan Hájek (CZE) 7–6(4), 6–7(3), 6–1, 6–7(4), 6–3
    - Tomáš Berdych (CZE) def. Mikhail Kukushkin (KAZ) 7–6(5), 6–2, 6–3
  - Argentina 2–0 Romania
    - David Nalbandian (ARG) def. Adrian Ungur (ROU) 6–3, 6–2, 5–7, 6–4
    - Juan Mónaco (ARG) def. Victor Hănescu (ROU) 7–6(5), 1–6, 6–1, 6–1
  - Chile 1–1 United States
    - Andy Roddick (USA) def. Nicolás Massú (CHI) 6–2, 4–6, 6–3, 6–4
    - Paul Capdeville (CHI) def. John Isner (USA) 6–7(5), 6–7(2), 7–6(3), 7–6(5), 6–4
  - Belgium 0–2 Spain
    - Fernando Verdasco (ESP) def. Xavier Malisse (BEL) 6–4, 6–3, 6–1
    - Rafael Nadal (ESP) def. Ruben Bemelmans (BEL) 6–2, 6–4, 6–2
  - Croatia 1–1 Germany
    - Marin Čilić (CRO) def. Florian Mayer (GER) 4–6, 6–0, 4–6, 6–3, 6–1
    - Philipp Kohlschreiber (GER) def. Ivan Dodig (CRO) 6–4, 3–6, 4–6, 7–6(6), 6–4
  - Austria 0–2 France
    - Jérémy Chardy (FRA) def. Jürgen Melzer (AUT) 7–5, 6–4, 7–5
    - Gilles Simon (FRA) def. Stefan Koubek (AUT) 6–0, 6–2, 6–3

=== March 3, 2011 (Thursday) ===
==== Basketball ====
- Euroleague Top 16, matchday 6 (teams in **bold** advance to quarterfinals):
  - Group E:
    - Lietuvos Rytas (Lithuania) 68–77 (Spain) **Caja Laboral**
    - Unicaja Málaga (Spain) 61–77 (Greece) **Panathinaikos Athens**
      - Final standings: Caja Laboral, Panathinaikos Athens 4–2; Lietuvos Rytas 3–3; Unicaja Málaga 1–5.
  - Group F:
    - **Regal FC Barcelona** (Spain) 76–58 (Slovenia) Union Olimpija Ljubljana
    - Virtus Roma (Italy) 82–69 (Israel) **Maccabi Tel Aviv**
      - Final standings: Regal FC Barcelona 6–0; Maccabi Tel Aviv 3–3; Virtus Roma 2–4; Union Olimpija Ljubljana 1–5.
  - Group G:
    - Efes Pilsen Istanbul (Turkey) 65–67 (Serbia) Partizan Belgrade
    - **Real Madrid** (Spain) 77–95 (Italy) **Montepaschi Siena**
      - Final standings: Real Madrid 5–1; Montepaschi Siena 4–2; Efes Pilsen 2–4; Partizan Belgrade 1–5.
  - Group H:
    - **Power Electronics Valencia** (Spain) 82–68 (Turkey) Fenerbahçe Ülker
    - **Olympiacos Piraeus** (Greece) 78–64 (Lithuania) Žalgiris Kaunas
      - Final standings: Olympiacos Piraeus 5–1; Power Electronics Valencia, Fenerbahçe Ülker 3–3; Žalgiris Kaunas 1–5.

==== Biathlon ====
- World Championships in Khanty-Mansiysk, Russia:
  - Mixed relay: (gold) Norway (Tora Berger, Ann Kristin Flatland, Ole Einar Bjørndalen, Tarjei Bø) 1:14:22.5 (0+7) (silver) Germany (Andrea Henkel, Magdalena Neuner, Arnd Peiffer, Michael Greis) 1:14:45.4 (0+8) (bronze) France (Marie-Laure Brunet, Marie Dorin, Alexis Bœuf, Martin Fourcade) 1:15:38.7 (0+8)
    - Norway win the event for the first time. Bjørndalen wins his 15th career title.
    - Final World Cup mixed relay standings: (1) France 150 points (2) Germany 148 (3) Sweden 141

==== Cricket ====
- World Cup:
  - Group A: Pakistan 184 (43 overs); Canada 138 (42.5 overs; Shahid Afridi 5/23) in Colombo, Sri Lanka. **Pakistan win by 46 runs.**
    - Standings: Pakistan 6 points (3 matches), Sri Lanka 4 (3), Australia 4 (2), New Zealand, Zimbabwe 2 (2), Canada, Kenya 0 (3).
  - Group B: South Africa 351/5 (50 overs; AB de Villiers 134, Hashim Amla 113); Netherlands 120 (34.5 overs) in Mohali, India. **South Africa win by 231 runs.**
    - Standings: South Africa 4 points (2 matches), India 3 (2), England 3 (3), West Indies, Ireland, Bangladesh 2 (2), Netherlands 0 (3).

==== Cross-country skiing ====
- Nordic World Ski Championships in Oslo, Norway:
  - Women's 4 × 5 km relay: (gold) Norway (Vibeke Skofterud, Therese Johaug, Kristin Størmer Steira, Marit Bjørgen) 53:30.0 (silver) Sweden (Ida Ingemarsdotter, Anna Haag, Britta Johansson Norgren, Charlotte Kalla) 54:06.1 (bronze) Finland (Pirjo Muranen, Aino-Kaisa Saarinen, Riitta-Liisa Roponen, Krista Lähteenmäki) 54:29.8
    - Norway win the women's relay for the first time since 2005, where Skofterud, Steira and Bjørgen were on the winning team.
    - Bjørgen wins her fourth title of the championships and eighth of her career.

==== Darts ====
- Premier League, week 4 in Exeter, England:
  - Terry Jenkins (ENG) 1–8 Simon Whitlock (AUS)
  - Mark Webster (WAL) 8–2 Adrian Lewis (ENG)
  - Gary Anderson (SCO) 8–3 James Wade (ENG)
  - Raymond van Barneveld (NED) 3–8 Phil Taylor (ENG)
    - Standings (after 4 matches): Anderson 8 points, Taylor 6, Whitlock, Webster, van Barneveld 4, Lewis, Wade, Jenkins 2.

==== Figure skating ====
- World Junior Championships in Gangneung, South Korea:
  - Men short program: (1) Keegan Messing (USA) 72.58 (2) Artur Dmitriev Jr. (RUS) 68.91 (3) Andrei Rogozine (CAN) 67.27
  - Pairs: (gold) Sui Wenjing/Han Cong (CHN) 167.01 points (silver) Ksenia Stolbova/Fedor Klimov (RUS) 159.60 (bronze) Narumi Takahashi/Mervin Tran (JPN) 154.52
    - Sui/Han win the title for the second successive time.

==== Football (soccer) ====
- Copa Libertadores second stage:
  - Group 2: Grêmio (Brazil) 2–0 (Peru) León de Huánuco
    - Standings: Grêmio 6 points (3 matches), (Colombia) Junior 6 (2), León de Huánuco 3 (3), (Bolivia) Oriente Petrolero 0 (2).
  - Group 4:
    - Vélez Sarsfield (Argentina) 3–4 (Chile) Universidad Católica
    - Caracas (Venezuela) 2–0 (Chile) Unión Española
      - Standings (after 2 matches): Universidad Católica 4 points, Vélez Sársfield, Caracas 3, Unión Española 1.
  - Group 8: LDU Quito (Ecuador) 3–0 (Argentina) Independiente
    - Standings (after 2 matches): LDU Quito, Independiente, (Uruguay) Peñarol, (Argentina) Godoy Cruz 3 points.
- CONCACAF Champions League quarterfinals, second leg (first leg score in parentheses):
  - Olimpia (Honduras) 1–2 (0–1) (Costa Rica) **Saprissa**. Saprissa win 3–1 on aggregate.

==== Freestyle skiing ====
- World Cup in Grindelwald, Switzerland:
  - Men's ski cross: (gold) Andreas Matt (AUT) (silver) Jouni Pellinen (FIN) (bronze) Christopher Del Bosco (CAN)
    - ski cross standings (after 8 of 11 events): (1) Matt 599 points (2) Del Bosco 385 (3) Pellinen 277
    - Overall standings: (1) Matt 75 points (2) Guilbaut Colas (FRA) 73 (3) Mikaël Kingsbury (CAN) 67
  - Women's ski cross: (gold) Marte Høie Gjefsen (NOR) (silver) Ophélie David (FRA) (bronze) Heidi Zacher (GER)
    - ski cross standings (after 8 of 11 events): (1) Zacher 472 points (2) Kelsey Serwa (CAN) 400 (3) Fanny Smith (SUI) 385
    - Overall standings: (1) Hannah Kearney (USA) 89 points (2) Cheng Shuang (CHN) 63 (3) Jennifer Heil (CAN) 62

==== Mixed martial arts ====
- UFC Live: Sanchez vs. Kampmann in Louisville, Kentucky, United States:
  - Welterweight bout: **Diego Sanchez** (USA) def. Martin Kampmann (DEN) by unanimous decision (29–28, 29–28, 29–28)
  - Middleweight bout: **Mark Muñoz** (USA) def. C. B. Dollaway (USA) by KO (punches)
  - Middleweight bout: **Chris Weidman** (USA) def. Alessio Sakara (ITA) by unanimous decision (30–27, 30–27, 30–27)
  - Bantamweight bout: **Brian Bowles** (USA) def. Damacio Page (USA) by technical submission (guillotine choke)

==== Ski jumping ====
- Nordic World Ski Championships in Oslo, Norway:
  - Individual large hill: (gold) Gregor Schlierenzauer (AUT) 277.5 points (silver) Thomas Morgenstern (AUT) 277.2 (bronze) Simon Ammann (SUI) 274.3
    - Schlierenzauer wins his first individual world title, and fourth overall.

==== Snooker ====
- Championship League Group 6:
  - Final: **Mark Allen** (NIR) 3–0 Stephen Lee (ENG)
    - Allen advances to the winners group.

=== March 2, 2011 (Wednesday) ===
==== Cricket ====
- World Cup:
  - Group B: England 327/8 (50 overs); Ireland 329/7 (49.1 overs; Kevin O'Brien 113) in Bangalore, India. **Ireland win by 3 wickets.**
    - Ireland record their highest score in One Day Internationals, surpassing their previous high of 325 set against Canada in 2010, and record the highest successful run chase in World Cup history. O'Brien scores the fastest century in World Cup history, reaching his 100 off 50 balls, 16 fewer than the previous record held by Matthew Hayden (AUS).
    - Standings: India 3 points (2 matches), England 3 (3), West Indies 2 (2), South Africa 2 (1), Ireland, Bangladesh 2 (2), Netherlands 0 (2).

==== Cross-country skiing ====
- Nordic World Ski Championships in Oslo, Norway:
  - Men's team sprint: (gold) Canada (Devon Kershaw, Alex Harvey) 19:10.0 (silver) Norway (Petter Northug, Ola Vigen Hattestad) 19:10.2 (bronze) Russia (Alexander Panzhinskiy, Nikita Kriukov) 19:10.5
    - Kershaw and Harvey win Canada's first world title in the championships' history.
  - Women's team sprint: (gold) Sweden (Ida Ingemarsdotter, Charlotte Kalla) 19:25.0 (silver) Finland (Aino-Kaisa Saarinen, Krista Lähteenmäki) 19:28.3 (bronze) Norway (Maiken Caspersen Falla, Astrid Uhrenholdt Jacobsen) 19:29.1
    - Sweden win the event for the first time, with Ingemarsdotter and Kalla both winning their first world title.

==== Figure skating ====
- World Junior Championships in Gangneung, South Korea:
  - Short Dance: (1) Ksenia Monko/Kirill Khaliavin (RUS) 60.62 points (2) Ekaterina Pushkash/Jonathan Guerreiro (RUS) 55.76 (3) Charlotte Lichtman/Dean Copely (USA) 55.28
  - Pairs short program: (1) Sui Wenjing/Han Cong (CHN) 59.16 points (2) Narumi Takahashi/Mervin Tran (JPN) 57.85 (3) Ksenia Stolbova/Fedor Klimov (RUS) 54.21

==== Football (soccer) ====
- Copa Libertadores second stage:
  - Group 1: San Luis (Mexico) 1–1 (Colombia) Once Caldas
    - Standings : (Peru) Universidad San Martín 6 points (2 matches), (Paraguay) Libertad 4 (2), Once Caldas 2 (3), San Luis 1 (3).
  - Group 3:
    - Nacional (Uruguay) 0–1 (Argentina) Argentinos Juniors
    - América (Mexico) 1–0 (Brazil) Fluminense
      - Standings (after 3 matches): Argentinos Juniors 7 points, América 6, Fluminense 2, Nacional 1.
  - Group 5: Santos (Brazil) 1–1 (Paraguay) Cerro Porteño
    - Standings (after 2 matches): Cerro Porteño 4 points, (Chile) Colo-Colo 3, Santos 2, (Venezuela) Deportivo Táchira 1.
  - Group 7: Deportes Tolima (Colombia) 0–0 (Brazil) Cruzeiro
    - Standings: Cruzeiro 7 points (3 matches), Deportes Tolima 4 (3), (Argentina) Estudiantes 3 (2), (Paraguay) Guaraní 0 (2).
- AFC Champions League group stage, matchday 1:
  - Group C:
    - Al-Wahda (United Arab Emirates) 1–1 (Uzbekistan) Bunyodkor
    - Al-Ittihad (Saudi Arabia) 3–1 (Iran) Persepolis
  - Group D:
    - Zob Ahan (Iran) 2–1 (United Arab Emirates) Emirates
    - Al-Rayyan (Qatar) 1–1 (Saudi Arabia) Al-Shabab
  - Group F: Al-Ain (United Arab Emirates) 0–1 (South Korea) FC Seoul
  - Group G:
    - Jeonbuk Hyundai Motors (South Korea) 1–0 (China) Shandong Luneng
    - Cerezo Osaka (Japan) 2–1 (Indonesia) Arema FC
  - Group H:
    - Sydney FC (Australia) 0–0 (South Korea) Suwon Samsung Bluewings
    - Shanghai Shenhua (China) 0–0 (Japan) Kashima Antlers
- AFC Cup group stage, matchday 1:
  - Group C:
    - Al-Faisaly (Jordan) 2–0 (Syria) Al-Jaish
    - Al-Nasr (Kuwait) 0–1 (Iraq) Duhok
  - Group D:
    - Al-Talaba (Iraq) 0–1 (Jordan) Al-Wehdat
    - Al-Suwaiq (Oman) 1–3 Kuwait SC
  - Group G:
    - Victory (Maldives) 1–3 (Singapore) Tampines Rovers
    - Muangthong United (Thailand) 4–0 (Vietnam) Hà Nội T&T
  - Group H:
    - Kingfisher East Bengal (India) 4–4 (Thailand) Chonburi
    - South China (Hong Kong) 1–1 (Indonesia) Persipura Jayapura
- CONCACAF Champions League quarterfinals, second leg (first leg score in parentheses, team in **bold** advance to the semifinals):
  - **Monterrey** (Mexico) 1–0 (1–0) (Mexico) Toluca. Monterrey win 2–0 on aggregate.

==== Nordic combined ====
- Nordic World Ski Championships in Oslo, Norway:
  - Individual large hill/10 km: (gold) Jason Lamy-Chappuis (FRA) 25:31.6 (silver) Johannes Rydzek (GER) 25:38.3 (bronze) Eric Frenzel (GER) 25:38.6
    - Lamy-Chappuis becomes the first Frenchman to win a Nordic combined world title.

=== March 1, 2011 (Tuesday) ===
==== Cricket ====
- World Cup:
  - Group A: Kenya 142 (43.4 overs; Lasith Malinga 6/38); Sri Lanka 146/1 (18.4 overs) in Colombo, Sri Lanka. **Sri Lanka win by 9 wickets.**
    - Malinga becomes the first player to bowl a hat-trick at two World Cups, and the fourth to bowl two One Day International hat-tricks, after Pakistan's Wasim Akram and Saqlain Mushtaq, and countryman Chaminda Vaas.
    - Standings: Sri Lanka 4 points (3 matches), Pakistan, Australia 4 (2), New Zealand, Zimbabwe 2 (2), Canada 0 (2), Kenya 0 (3).

==== Cross-country skiing ====
- Nordic World Ski Championships in Oslo, Norway:
  - Men's 15 km classical: (gold) Matti Heikkinen (FIN) 38:14.7 (silver) Eldar Rønning (NOR) 38:28.0 (bronze) Martin Johnsrud Sundby (NOR) 38:46.6
    - Heikkinen wins Finland's first gold medal in the event since Harri Kirvesniemi in 1989 and the first title in men's cross-country since Mika Myllylä in 1999.

==== Football (soccer) ====
- Copa Libertadores second stage:
  - Group 5: Deportivo Táchira (Venezuela) 2–4 (Chile) Colo-Colo
    - Standings: (Paraguay) Cerro Porteño 3 points (1 match), Colo-Colo 3 (2), (Brazil) Santos 1 (1), Deportivo Táchira 1 (2).
  - Group 8: Godoy Cruz (Argentina) 1–3 (Uruguay) Peñarol
    - Standings: (Argentina) Independiente 3 points (1 match), Peñarol, Godoy Cruz 3 (2), (Ecuador) LDU Quito 0 (1).
- AFC Champions League group stage, matchday 1:
  - Group A:
    - Al-Jazira (United Arab Emirates) 0–0 (Qatar) Al-Gharafa
    - Al-Hilal (Saudi Arabia) 1–2 (Iran) Sepahan
  - Group B:
    - Pakhtakor (Uzbekistan) 2–2 (Saudi Arabia) Al-Nassr
    - Esteghlal (Iran) 1–1 (Qatar) Al-Sadd
  - Group E:
    - Jeju United (South Korea) 0–1 (China) Tianjin Teda
    - Gamba Osaka (Japan) 5–1 (Australia) Melbourne Victory
  - Group F: Hangzhou Greentown (China) 2–0 (Japan) Nagoya Grampus
- AFC Cup group stage, matchday 1:
  - Group A:
    - Dempo SC (India) 2–1 (Yemen) Al-Tilal
    - Nasaf Qarshi (Uzbekistan) 3–0 (Lebanon) Al-Ansar
  - Group B:
    - Al-Saqr (Yemen) 1–2 (Syria) Al-Ittihad
    - Al-Qadsia (Kuwait) 4–0 (Uzbekistan) Shurtan
  - Group E:
    - Al Ahed (Lebanon) 1–2 (Iraq) Arbil
    - Al-Karamah (Syria) 2–2 (Oman) Al-Oruba
  - Group F:
    - Sriwijaya (Indonesia) 1–1 (Maldives) VB
    - Sông Lam Nghệ An (Vietnam) 1–2 (Hong Kong) TSW Pegasus
- CONCACAF Champions League quarterfinals, second leg (first leg score in parentheses, teams in **bold** advance to the semifinals):
  - Santos Laguna (Mexico) 1–3 (0–2) (Mexico) **Cruz Azul**. Cruz Azul win 5–1 on aggregate.
  - **Real Salt Lake** (United States) 4–1 (0–0) (United States) Columbus Crew. Real Salt Lake win 4–1 on aggregate.

==== Snooker ====
- Championship League Group 5:
  - Final: Mark Allen (NIR) 0–3 **Ryan Day** (WAL)
    - Day advances to the winners group.
