= Netherlands at the UCI Track Cycling World Championships =

- IOC code: NED
- Medals: Gold 41 Silver 40 Bronze 45 Total 126

UCI Track Cycling World Championships appearances (overview)
- Recent: ... 1980 1981 1982 ...: 2008; 2009; 2010; 2011; 2012; 2013; 2014; 2015; 2016; 2017; 2018; 2019; 2020; 2021; 2022; 2023; 2024; 2025

This page is an overview of the Netherlands at the UCI Track Cycling World Championships.

== List of medalists ==
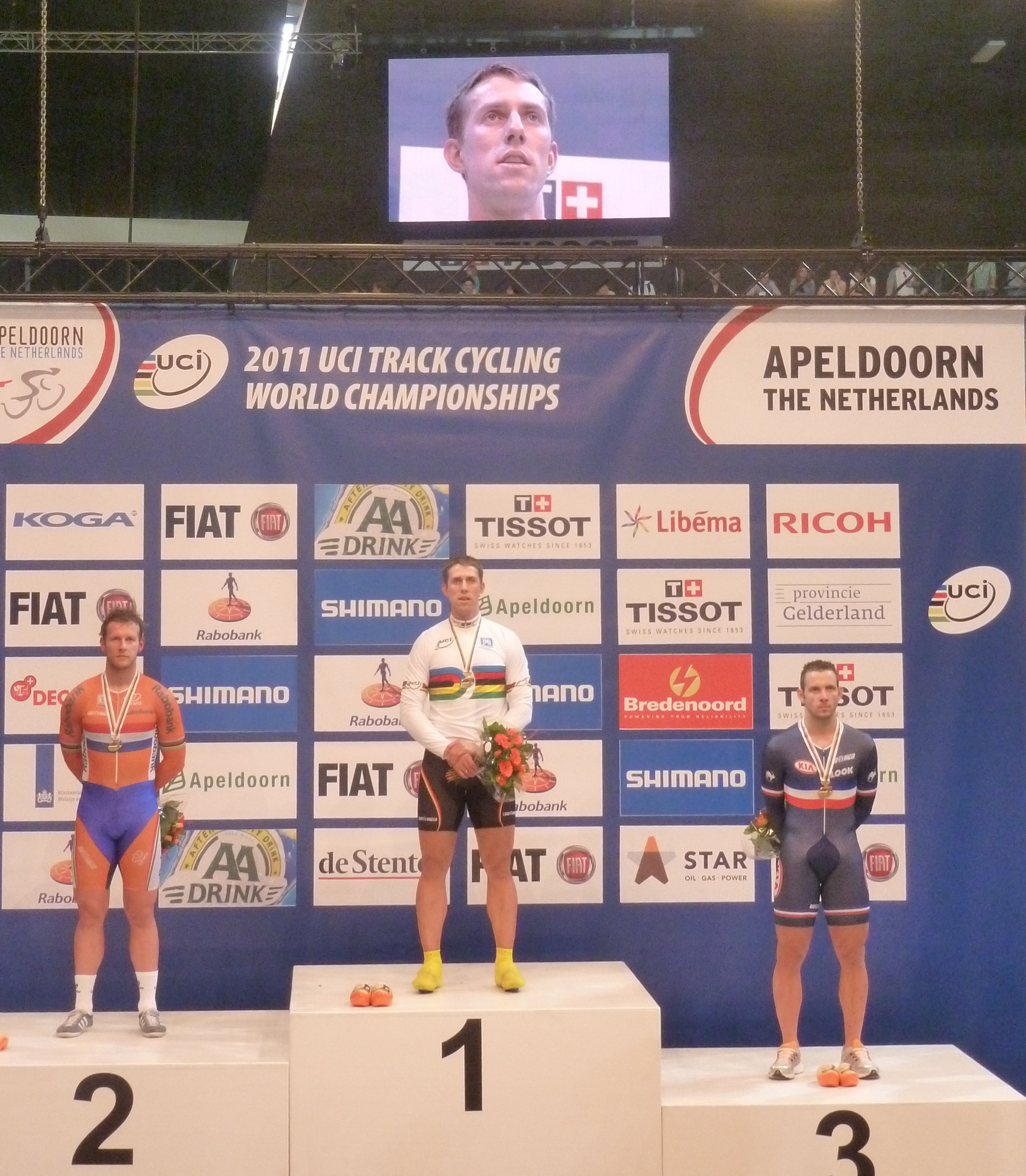
Teun Mulder won the silver medal in the 1 km time trial in 2011.

This is a list of Dutch medals won at the UCI Track World Championships. This list does not (yet) include the amateur disciplines and defunct disciplines.

Medal	Championship	Name	Event
Silver	1900 Paris	Harie Meyers	Men's sprint
Bronze	1901 Berlin	Guus Schilling	Men's sprint
Silver	1902 Rome	Harie Meyers	Men's sprint
Bronze	1903 Copenhagen	Harie Meyers	Men's sprint
Gold	1921 Copenhagen	Piet Moeskops	Men's sprint
Gold	1922 Paris	Piet Moeskops	Men's sprint
Gold	1923 Zürich	Piet Moeskops	Men's sprint
Gold	1924 Paris	Piet Moeskops	Men's sprint
Gold	1926 Milan	Piet Moeskops	Men's sprint
Silver	1929 Zürich	Piet Moeskops	Men's sprint
Silver	1930 Brussels	Piet Moeskops	Men's sprint
Silver	1937 Copenhagen	Arie van Vliet	Men's sprint
Gold	1938 Amsterdam	Arie van Vliet	Men's sprint
Gold	1946 Zürich	Gerard Peters	Men's individual pursuit
Gold	1946 Zürich	Jan Derksen	Men's sprint
Bronze	1946 Zürich	Arie van Vliet	Men's sprint
Gold	1948 Amsterdam	Gerrit Schulte	Men's individual pursuit
Gold	1948 Amsterdam	Arie van Vliet	Men's sprint
Silver	1949 Copenhagen	Jan Derksen	Men's sprint
Bronze	1949 Copenhagen	Arie van Vliet	Men's sprint
Bronze	1949 Copenhagen	Wim van Est	Men's individual pursuit
Silver	1950 Rocourt	Arie van Vliet	Men's sprint
Silver	1950 Rocourt	Wim van Est	Men's individual pursuit
Bronze	1950 Rocourt	Jan Derksen	Men's sprint
Bronze	1952 Paris	Jan Derksen	Men's sprint
Gold	1953 Zürich	Arie van Vliet	Men's sprint
Silver	1954 Cologne	Arie van Vliet	Men's sprint
Bronze	1955 Milan	Arie van Vliet	Men's sprint
Bronze	1955 Milan	Wim van Est	Men's individual pursuit
Silver	1957 Rocourt	Jan Derksen	Men's sprint
Bronze	1957 Rocourt	Arie van Vliet	Men's sprint
Bronze	1959 Amsterdam	Jan Derksen	Men's sprint
Gold	1962 Milan	Henk Nijdam	Men's individual pursuit
Bronze	1962 Milan	Peter Post	Men's individual pursuit
Silver	1963 Rocourt	Peter Post	Men's individual pursuit
Bronze	1963 Rocourt	Henk Nijdam	Men's individual pursuit
Gold	1967 Amsterdam	Tiemen Groen	Men's individual pursuit
Bronze	1968 Rome	Keetie van Oosten-Hage	Women's individual pursuit
Bronze	1969 Antwerp	Peter Post	Men's individual pursuit
Bronze	1969 Antwerp	Keetie van Oosten-Hage	Women's individual pursuit
Bronze	1970 Leicester	Leijn Loevesijn	Men's sprint
Bronze	1970 Leicester	Keetie van Oosten-Hage	Women's individual pursuit
Gold	1971 Varese	Leijn Loevesijn	Men's sprint
Silver	1971 Varese	Keetie van Oosten-Hage	Women's individual pursuit
Silver	1972 Palma de Mallorca	Keetie van Oosten-Hage	Women's individual pursuit
Silver	1972 Palma de Mallorca	Wilhelmina Brinkhoff	Women's sprint
Silver	1973 San Sebastián	René Pijnen	Men's individual pursuit
Silver	1973 San Sebastián	Keetie van Oosten-Hage	Women's individual pursuit
Gold	1974 Montreal	Roy Schuiten	Men's individual pursuit
Bronze	1974 Montreal	René Pijnen	Men's individual pursuit
Bronze	1974 Montreal	Keetie van Oosten-Hage	Women's individual pursuit
Gold	1975 Rocourt	Roy Schuiten	Men's individual pursuit
Gold	1975 Rocourt	Keetie van Oosten-Hage	Women's individual pursuit
Gold	1976 Monteroni di Lecce	Keetie van Oosten-Hage	Women's individual pursuit
Silver	1976 Monteroni di Lecce	Roy Schuiten	Men's individual pursuit
Silver	1977 Monteroni di Lecce	Anne Riemersma	Women's individual pursuit
Gold	1978 Munich	Keetie van Oosten-Hage	Women's individual pursuit
Silver	1978 Munich	Roy Schuiten	Men's individual pursuit
Silver	1978 Munich	Anne Riemersma	Women's individual pursuit
Gold	1979 Amsterdam	Bert Oosterbosch	Men's individual pursuit
Gold	1979 Amsterdam	Keetie van Oosten-Hage	Women's individual pursuit
Silver	1979 Amsterdam	Anne Riemersma	Women's individual pursuit
Silver	1979 Amsterdam	Truus van der Plaat	Women's sprint
Bronze	1979 Amsterdam	Herman Ponsteen	Men's individual pursuit
Silver	1980 Besançon	Herman Ponsteen	Men's individual pursuit
Bronze	1980 Besançon	Petra de Bruin	Women's individual pursuit
Gold	1981 Brno	Mattheus Pronk	Men's amateur motor-paced
Gold	1981 Brno	René Koos	Men's motor-paced
Bronze	1981 Brno	Bert Oosterbosch	Men's individual pursuit
Bronze	1988 Ghent	Monique de Bruin	Women's points race
Gold	1990 Maebashi	Leontien van Moorsel	Women's individual pursuit
Gold	1991 Stuttgart	Ingrid Haringa	Women's points race
Gold	1991 Stuttgart	Ingrid Haringa	Women's sprint
Bronze	1991 Stuttgart	Peter Pieters	Men's points race
Gold	1992 Valencia	Ingrid Haringa	Women's points race
Gold	1993 Hamar	Ingrid Haringa	Women's points race
Silver	1993 Hamar	Ingrid Haringa	Women's sprint
Gold	1994 Palermo	Ingrid Haringa	Women's points race
Silver	1998 Bordeaux	Leontien Zijlaard-van Moorsel	Women's individual pursuit
Gold	2001 Antwerp	Leontien Zijlaard-van Moorsel	Women's individual pursuit
Gold	2002 Ballerup	Leontien Zijlaard-van Moorsel	Women's individual pursuit
Gold	2003 Stuttgart	Leontien Zijlaard-van Moorsel	Women's individual pursuit
Bronze	2003 Stuttgart	Adrie Visser	Women's scratch
Bronze	2003 Stuttgart	Jos Pronk	Men's points race
Gold	2004 Melbourne	Theo Bos	Men's sprint
Silver	2004 Melbourne	Robert Slippens	Men's scratch
Bronze	2004 Melbourne	Danny Stam; Robert Slippens	Men's madison
Bronze	2004 Melbourne	Theo Bos	Men's 1 km time trial
Gold	2005 Los Angeles	Theo Bos	Men's 1 km time trial
Gold	2005 Los Angeles	Teun Mulder	Men's keirin
Silver	2005 Los Angeles	Theo Bos; Teun Mulder; Tim Veldt	Men's team sprint
Silver	2005 Los Angeles	Niki Terpstra; Peter Schep; Jens Mouris; Levi Heimans	Men's team pursuit
Silver	2005 Los Angeles	Danny Stam; Robert Slippens	Men's madison
Bronze	2005 Los Angeles	Levi Heimans	Men's individual pursuit
Bronze	2005 Los Angeles	Yvonne Hijgenaar	Women's keirin
Bronze	2005 Los Angeles	Yvonne Hijgenaar	Women's 500 m time trial
Gold	2006 Bordeaux	Peter Schep	Men's points race
Gold	2006 Bordeaux	Theo Bos	Men's sprint
Gold	2006 Bordeaux	Theo Bos	Men's keirin
Silver	2006 Bordeaux	Jens Mouris	Men's individual pursuit
Gold	2007 Palma de Mallorca	Theo Bos	Men's sprint
Silver	2007 Palma de Mallorca	Yvonne Hijgenaar; Willy Kanis	Women's team sprint
Silver	2007 Palma de Mallorca	Theo Bos	Men's keirin
Silver	2007 Palma de Mallorca	Wim Stroetinga	Men's scratch
Silver	2007 Palma de Mallorca	Danny Stam; Peter Schep	Men's madison
Bronze	2007 Palma de Mallorca	Adrie Visser	Women's scratch
Gold	2008 Manchester	Ellen van Dijk	Women's scratch
Gold	2008 Manchester	Marianne Vos	Women's points race
Gold	2008 Manchester	Teun Mulder	Men's 1 km time trial
Silver	2008 Manchester	Teun Mulder	Men's keirin
Silver	2008 Manchester	Wim Stroetinga	Men's scratch
Silver	2008 Manchester	Jenning Huizenga	Men's individual pursuit
Bronze	2008 Manchester	Peter Schep	Men's points race
Bronze	2008 Manchester	Theo Bos; Teun Mulder; Tim Veldt	Men's team sprint
Silver	2009 Pruszków	Willy Kanis	Women's sprint
Bronze	2009 Pruszków	Teun Mulder	Men's keirin
Bronze	2009 Pruszków	Tim Veldt	Men's omnium
Bronze	2009 Pruszków	Willy Kanis	Women's keirin
Bronze	2009 Pruszków	Yvonne Hijgenaar	Women's omnium
Gold	2010 Ballerup	Teun Mulder	Men's 1 km time trial
Silver	2010 Ballerup	Peter Schep	Men's points race
Gold	2011 Apeldoorn	Marianne Vos	Women's scratch
Silver	2011 Apeldoorn	Teun Mulder	Men's 1 km time trial
Bronze	2011 Apeldoorn	Teun Mulder	Men's keirin
Bronze	2011 Apeldoorn	Theo Bos; Peter Schep	Men's madison
Bronze	2011 Apeldoorn	Kirsten Wild	Women's omnium
Bronze	2012 Melbourne	Wim Stroetinga	Men's scratch
Bronze	2013 Minsk	Matthijs Büchli	Men's keirin
Silver	2014 Cali	Tim Veldt	Men's omnium
Bronze	2014 Cali	Matthijs Büchli	Men's keirin
Gold	2015 Saint-Quentin-en-Yvelines	Kirsten Wild	Women's scratch
Silver	2015 Saint-Quentin-en-Yvelines	Elis Ligtlee	Women's sprint
Silver	2015 Saint-Quentin-en-Yvelines	Shanne Braspennincx	Women's keirin
Bronze	2015 Saint-Quentin-en-Yvelines	Kirsten Wild	Women's omnium
Silver	2016 London	Nils van 't Hoenderdaal; Jeffrey Hoogland; Matthijs Büchli; Hugo Haak	Men's Team Sprint
Silver	2016 London	Theo Bos	Men's 1 km time trial
Silver	2016 London	Kirsten Wild	Women's scratch
Bronze	2016 London	Elis Ligtlee	Women's 500m time trial
Silver	2017 Hong Kong	Harrie Lavreysen	Men's Sprint
Silver	2017 Hong Kong	Nils van 't Hoenderdaal; Jeffrey Hoogland; Matthijs Büchli; Hugo Haak; Theo Bos	Men's Team Sprint
Silver	2017 Hong Kong	Kirsten Wild	Women's points race
Bronze	2017 Hong Kong	Kirsten Wild	Women's omnium
Gold	2018 Apeldoorn	Nils van 't Hoenderdaal; Jeffrey Hoogland; Matthijs Büchli; Harrie Lavreysen	Men's Team Sprint
Gold	2018 Apeldoorn	Jeffrey Hoogland	Men's 1 km time trial
Gold	2018 Apeldoorn	Kirsten Wild	Women's omnium
Gold	2018 Apeldoorn	Kirsten Wild	Women's points race
Gold	2018 Apeldoorn	Kirsten Wild	Women's scratch race

== Medal table ==
=== Medals by discipline ===
updated after the 2014 UCI Track Cycling World Championships

Event	Gold	Silver	Bronze	Total	Rank
Men's 1 km time trial	2	1	1	4	
Men's individual pursuit	7	8	9	24	
Men's team pursuit	0	1	0	1	
Men's sprint	13	8	10	31	
Men's team sprint	0	1	1	2	
Men's keirin	2	2	4	8	
Men's scratch	0	3	1	4	
Men's points race	1	1	3	5	
Men's omnium	0	1	1	2	
Men's madison	0	2	2	4	
Women's 500 m time trial	0	0	1	1	
Women's individual pursuit	8	7	5	20	
Women's team pursuit	0	0	0	0	-
Women's sprint	1	4	0	5	
Women's team sprint	0	1	0	1	
Women's keirin	0	0	2	2	
Women's scratch	2	0	2	4	
Women's points race	5	0	1	6	
Women's omnium	0	0	2	2	
Total	41	40	45	126	

=== Medals by championships ===
incomplete, you can help by adding the Dutch results at championships before 2001

Event	Gold	Silver	Bronze	Total	Rank
2001 Antwerp	1	0	0	1	6
2002 Ballerup	1	0	0	1	7
2003 Stuttgart	1	0	2	3	8
2004 Melbourne	1	1	2	4	7
2005 Los Angeles	2	3	3	8	8
2006 Bordeaux	3	1	0	4	1
2007 Palma de Mallorca	1	4	1	6	3
2008 Manchester	3	3	2	8	2
2009 Pruszków	0	1	4	5	13
2010 Ballerup	1	1	0	2	7
2011 Apeldoorn	1	1	3	5	6
2012 Melbourne	0	0	1	1	12
2013 Minsk	0	0	1	1	17
2014 Cali	0	1	1	2	12
2015 Saint-Quentin-en-Yvelines	1	2	1	4	5
2016 London	0	3	1	4	12

== Broken records at World Championships ==
incomplete, only women's 3000 m team pursuit records listed

=== Women's 3000 m team pursuit ===
After the introduction of the women's 3000m team pursuit at the 2007–08 track cycling season, the Dutch team broke three time the Dutch record at the World Championships. The latest one is not the current record anymore.

Time	Speed (km/h)	Cyclists	Event	Location of race	Date	Ref
3:31.596	51.040	Ellen van Dijk; Marlijn Binnendijk; Elise van Hage	2008 UCI Track Cycling World Championships (Qualifying)	(United Kingdom) Manchester	28 March 2008	
3:29.379	51.581	Ellen van Dijk; Amy Pieters; Vera Koedooder	2009 UCI Track Cycling World Championships (Bronze medal race)	(Poland) Pruszków	26 March 2009	
3:25.156	52.642	Ellen van Dijk; Amy Pieters; Vera Koedooder	2010 UCI Track Cycling World Championships (Qualifying)	(Denmark) Ballerup	25 March 2010	

== 1981 ==
The Netherlands competed at the 1981 UCI Track Cycling World Championships in Brno, Czechoslovakia in 1981. The event consisted of 14 disciplines for professional and amateur men and women. The Netherlands sent a team of 4 women, 13 amateur men and 7 professional men cyclists. With 2 gold and one bronze medal, the Netherlands finished third in the medal table.

The next riders were selected by the KNWU after the Dutch national championships and were published on 10 August 1981. For the men's motor paced Martin Rietveld was replaced by Fred Rompelberg. From the five selected riders for the men's team pursuit Peter Pieters was not selected by the coach after his bad performance in the individual pursuit.

Men's amateur points race
Peter Pieters – DNF

Men's amateur 1 km time trial
Rainier Valkenburg – 12th in 1:09.13 (9th?)

Men's amateur sprint
Reinier Valkenburg – 1st round won ( (Switzerland) Isler), lost 2nd round ( (Soviet Union) Goelasjvili), lost 2nd round repaches ( (Poland) Platek)
Sjaak Pieters – 1st round lost, 1st round repaches lost
Tom Vrolijk – 1st round lost, 1st round repaches lost

Men's Keirin
Hans Vonk – 1st round did not advance, 1st round repaches did not advance

Men's amateur team pursuit
Qualification Ab Harren, Rik Moorman, John Roozenburg, Ab van Asten in 4:39.56 (did not qualify)

Men's amateur tandem
Tom Vrolijk/Peter Pieters – Won 1st round (vs. Poland) (qualified for semi final) – Semi final

Men's individual pursuit
Roy Schuiten – 2nd in 6:03.42 (qualified for semi final) – Lost semi final – Lost semi final – Lost bronze medal race (vs. Bert Oosterbosch)
Herman Ponsteen – Qualification in 6:09.46 (did not qualify for quarter finals)
Bert Oosterbosch – 3rd in 6:06.87 (qualified for semi finals) – Won semi final – Won bronze medal race (vs. Roy Schuiten)

Men's amateur individual pursuit

The Dutch men Ad van Asten and national champion Peter Pieters finished disappointingly 29th and 35th. Their times were about 5 seconds slower as during the national championships in Nijmegen.

Ad van Asten – 29th in qualification (did not qualify for next round)
Peter Pieters – 35th in qualification (did not qualify for next round)

Men's motor-paced
Martin Venix – Won qualification (qualified for final)
René Kos – Qualification (qualified for final) – (gold) in final
Fred Rompelberg – Qualification (did not qualify for final) -

Men's amateur motor-paced

Both Mathé Pronk and Gaby Minneboo qualified with a second place in the 1st round directly for the final, respectively behind Podlesch from East Germany and Fusarpoli from Italy. Coach Stam was not totally satisfied as Ger Slot and Eric Geserick did not qualify. Minneboo tried to help Slot, but Slot was not good enough. Also the motor of his pacer Van Duivenbode damaged during the race and leaked oil. Just after the start a foot of Geserick came out of his toeclip, and couldn't ride thereafter his qualification well.

Gaby Minneboo – 2nd in 1st round (qualified for final) – 7th in final
Marthé Pronk – 2nd in 1st round (qualified for final) – (gold) in final (stayer Noppie Koch)
Eric Geserick – 1st round (did not qualify) – 5th in 1st round repechages heat 1 (did not qualify)
Ger Slot – 1st round (did not qualify) – 1st in 1st round repechages heat 2 (qualified) (stayer Koch van Pronk) – Disqualified in final (stayer Van Duivenbode)

Women's sprint
Erica Oomen – Won qualification, (vs. (Czech Republic) Hana Hotova & (United States) Conny Paraskevin) (qualified) – Lost 2nd round (vs. (United States) Sheila Young) (did not qualify) – Lost 2nd round repechages (vs. Sue Novarra) (did not qualify)
Sandra de Neef – Lost qualification, (vs. (Czech Republic) ) (did not qualify for next round)

Women's individual pursuit
Petra de Bruin – 9th in qualification (did not qualify)
Monique Kauffmann – Qualification 4:02.17 (qualified for quarter finals) – Lost quarter finals from (Soviet Union) Nedegeda Kibardina 4:07.31 vs. 3:56.71

== 2008 ==
The Netherlands competed at the 2008 UCI Track Cycling World Championships in Manchester, Great Britain, from 26 March to 30 March 2008. The event consisted of 18 different disciplines for elite men and women, the Netherlands competed in 17 of them.

Sprint

Cyclist	Event	Qualification		1/16 final	1/8 final	Repechage	Quarterfinals	Semifinals	Final	
Cyclist	Event	Time Speed (km/h)	Rank	Opposition Time Speed (km/h)	Opposition Time Speed (km/h)	Opposition Time Speed (km/h)	Opposition Time	Opposition Time	Opposition Time	Rank
Theo Bos	Men's sprint	10.032; 71.770	4 Q	Kwiatkowski (POL); W 10.740; 67.039	Bayley (AUS); W 10.571; 68.110	BYE	Hoy (GBR); W 13.334, L, L	Did not advance	Race for 5th place Kenny (GBR); Vynokurov (UKR); Baugé (FRA)	8
Teun Mulder	Men's sprint	10.310; 69.835	20 Q	Hoy (GBR); L	did not advance					20
Tim Veldt	Men's sprint	10.373; 69.410	27	did not advance						43
Willy Kanis	Women's sprint	11.172; 64.446	6 Q	Frisoni (ITA); W 12.518; 57.517	No opponent Q 16.221; 44.386	BYE	Krupeckaitė (LTU); W 11.604, L, L	Did not advance	Race for 5th place Sanchez (FRA); Guerra (CUB); Hijgenaar (NED); W 12.049; 59.755	5
Yvonne Hijgenaar	Women's sprint	11.298; 63.728	10 Q	Glöss (GER); W 11.925; 60.377	Krupeckaitė (LTU); L	Muche (GER); Zheng (CHN); W 12.647; 56.930	Pendleton (GBR); L, L	Did not advance	Race for 5th place Kanis (NED); Sanchez (FRA); Guerra (CUB); L	8

Time trial

Cyclist	Event	Final	
Cyclist	Event	Time Speed (km/h)	Rank
Teun Mulder	Men's 1 km time trial	1:01.332; 58.696	1st place, gold medalist(s)
Tim Veldt	Men's 1 km time trial	1:02.757; 57.364	9
Willy Kanis	Women's 500 m time trial	34.254; 52.548	4
Yvonne Hijgenaar	Women's 500 m time trial	34.896; 51.581	10

Individual Pursuit

Cyclist	Event	Qualification		Final	
Cyclist	Event	Time Speed (km/h)	Rank	Opponent Results	Rank
Jenning Huizenga	Men's individual pursuit	4:16.343; 56.174	1 Q	Wiggins (GBR); L 4:18.519; 55.701	2nd place, silver medalist(s)
Jens Mouris	Men's individual pursuit	4:24.475; 54.447	14	Did not advance	14
Ellen van Dijk	Women's individual pursuit	3:32.505; 50.822	5	Did not advance	5

Team pursuit

Cyclist	Event	Qualification		Final	
Cyclist	Event	Time Speed (km/h)	Rank	Opponent Time Speed	Rank
Levi Heimans; Jenning Huizenga; Jens Mouris; Peter Schep	Men's team pursuit	4:05.302; 58.703	8	Did not advance	8
Ellen van Dijk; Elise van Hage; Marlijn Binnendijk	Women's team pursuit	3:31.596 NR; 51.040	6	Did not advance	6

Team sprint

Cyclist	Event	Qualification		Final	
Cyclist	Event	Time Speed (km/h)	Rank	Opponent Results	Rank
Theo Bos; Tim Veldt; Teun Mulder	Men's team sprint	43.958; 61.422	3 q	Germany; W 43.718; 61.759	3rd place, bronze medalist(s)

Keirin

Cyclist	Event	1st Round	Repechage	2nd Round	Final
Cyclist	Event	Rank	Rank	Rank	Rank
Teun Mulder	Men's keirin	3 R	1 Q	3 Q	2nd place, silver medalist(s)
Theo Bos	Men's keirin	4 R	2	Did not advance	13
Willy Kanis	Women's keirin	3 R	1 Q	6	9

Scratch

Cyclist	Event	Final
Cyclist	Event	Rank
Wim Stroetinga	Men's scratch	2nd place, silver medalist(s)
Ellen van Dijk	Women's scratch	1st place, gold medalist(s)

Points race

Cyclist	Event	Final			
Cyclist	Event	Points	Laps	Finish order	Rank
Peter Schep	Men's points race	19	0		2nd place, silver medalist(s)
Marianne Vos	Women's points race	33	1		1st place, gold medalist(s)

Madison

Cyclist	Event	Final			
Cyclist	Event	Points	Laps	Finish order	Rank
Jens Mouris; Peter Schep	Men's madison	5	-1		10

Omnium

Cyclist	Event	Flying lap		Points race		Individual pursuit		Scratch race	Time trial		Total points	Rank
Cyclist	Event	Time	Rank	Points	Rank	Time	Rank	Rank	Time	Rank	Total points	Rank
Robert Slippens	Men's omnium	11.132	12	3	9	3:19.355	5	15	1:05.632	10	51	11

== 2009 ==
The Netherlands competed at the 2009 UCI Track Cycling World Championships in Pruszków, Poland, from 25 March to 29 March 2009. The event consisted of 19 different disciplines for elite men and women.

Sprint

Cyclist	Event	Qualification		1/16 final	1/8 final	Repechage	Quarterfinals	Semifinals	Final	
Cyclist	Event	Time Speed (km/h)	Rank	Opposition Time Speed (km/h)	Opposition Time Speed (km/h)	Opposition Time Speed (km/h)	Opposition Time	Opposition Time	Opposition Time	Rank
Teun Mulder	Men's sprint	10.294; 69.943	16	D'Almeida (FRA); L	did not advance					16
Yondi Schmidt	Men's sprint	10.869; 66.243	43	did not advance						43
Willy Kanis	Women's sprint	11.226; 64.136	6	Sullivan (CAN); W 12.265; 58.703	Vogel (GER); W 12.231; 58.866	Panarina (BLR); Cueff (FRA); L	Shulika (UKR); L, W 11.775, W 11.722	Krupeckaitė (LTU); W 12.305, W 11.594	Pendleton (GBR); L, W 11.665, L	2nd place, silver medalist(s)
Yvonne Hijgenaar	Women's sprint	11.573; 62.213	13	Huang (TPE); W 12.041; 59.795	Pendleton (GBR); L	Sanchez (ESP); Vogel (GER); W 12.191; 59.059	Krupeckaitė (LTU); L, L	Did not advance	Race for 5th place Guo (CHN); Shulika (UKR); McCulloch (AUS); L	7

Time trial

Cyclist	Event	Final	
Cyclist	Event	Time Speed (km/h)	Rank
Teun Mulder	Men's 1 km time trial	1:02.209; 57.869	6
Tim Veldt	Men's 1 km time trial	1:02.886; 57.246	12
Yondi Schmidt	Men's 1 km time trial	1:03.480; 56.710	17
Willy Kanis	Women's 500 m time trial	34.258; 52.542	5
Yvonne Hijgenaar	Women's 500 m time trial	35.054; 51.349	10

Individual Pursuit

Cyclist	Event	Qualification		Final	
Cyclist	Event	Time Speed (km/h)	Rank	Opponent Results	Rank
Levi Heimans	Men's individual pursuit	4:28.638; 53.603	13	Did not advance	13
Ellen van Dijk	Women's individual pursuit	3:38.373; 49.456	6	Did not advance	6

Team pursuit

Cyclist	Event	Qualification		Final	
Cyclist	Event	Time Speed (km/h)	Rank	Opponent Time Speed	Rank
Levi Heimans; Geert-Jan Jonkman; Arno van der Zwet; Sipke Zijlstra	Men's team pursuit	4:08.667; 57.908	7	Did not advance	7
Ellen van Dijk; Amy Pieters; Vera Koedooder	Women's team pursuit	3:30.893; 51.210	4 Q	(Australia) Australia; L, 3:29.379 NR; 51.581	4

Team sprint

Cyclist	Event	Qualification		Final	
Cyclist	Event	Time Speed (km/h)	Rank	Opponent Results	Rank
Yondi Schmidt; Tim Veldt; Teun Mulder	Men's team sprint	44.999; 60.001	7	Did not advance	7
Yvonne Hijgenaar; Willy Kanis	Women's team sprint	33.791; 53.268	5	Did not advance	5

Keirin

Cyclist	Event	1st Round	Repechage	2nd Round	Final
Cyclist	Event	Rank	Rank	Rank	Rank
Teun Mulder	Men's keirin	2 Q	BYE	3 Q	3rd place, bronze medalist(s)
Yondi Schmidt	Men's keirin	4 R	3	Did not advance	17
Yvonne Hijgenaar	Women's keirin	6 R	3	Did not advance	16
Willy Kanis	Women's keirin	4 R	1 Q	2 Q	3rd place, bronze medalist(s)

Scratch

Cyclist	Event	Final	
Cyclist	Event	Laps	Rank
Wim Stroetinga	Men's scratch	-1	20
Ellen van Dijk	Women's scratch		6

Points race

Cyclist	Event	Final			
Cyclist	Event	Points	Laps	Finish order	Rank
Pim Ligthart	Men's points race	-20	-1	22	19
Ellen van Dijk	Women's points race	0	0	11	15

Madison

Cyclist	Event	Final			
Cyclist	Event	Points	Laps	Finish order	Rank
Pim Ligthart; Wim Stroetinga	Madison	0	-1	18	11

Omnium

Cyclist	Event	Flying lap		Points race		Individual pursuit		Scratch race	Time trial		Total points	Rank
Cyclist	Event	Time	Rank	Points	Rank	Time	Rank	Rank	Time	Rank	Total points	Rank
Tim Veldt	Men's omnium	10.534	2	8	1	3:19.819	4	16	1:03.089	1	24	3rd place, bronze medalist(s)
Yvonne Hijgenaar	Women's omnium	11.400	1	2	9	2:27.757	9	7	35.242	1	27	3rd place, bronze medalist(s)

== 2010 ==
The Netherlands competed at the 2010 UCI Track Cycling World Championships in Ballerup, Copenhagen, Denmark, from 24 March to 28 March 2010. The event consisted of 19 different disciplines for elite men and women, the Netherlands competed in 18 of them.

Sprint

Cyclist	Event	Qualification		1/16 final	1/8 final	Repechage	Quarterfinals	Semifinals	Final	
Cyclist	Event	Time Speed (km/h)	Rank	Opposition Time Speed (km/h)	Opposition Time Speed (km/h)	Opposition Time Speed (km/h)	Opposition Time Speed (km/h)	Opposition Time Speed (km/h)	Opposition Time Speed (km/h)	Rank
Roy van den Berg	Men's sprint	10.342; 69.619	25	did not advance						25
Yondi Schmidt	Men's sprint	10.602; 67.911	38	did not advance						38
Willy Kanis	Women's sprint	11.385; 63.241	13	Clair (FRA); W 11.418; 63.058	McCulloch (FRA); L	Panarina (BLR); Cueff (FRA); L	did not advance			9
Yvonne Hijgenaar	Women's sprint	11.105; 64.835	15	Vogel (GER); L	did not advance					20

Time trial

Cyclist	Event	Final	
Cyclist	Event	Time Speed (km/h)	Rank
Teun Mulder	Men's 1 km time trial	1:00.341; 59.660	1st place, gold medalist(s)
Willy Kanis	Women's 500 m time trial	33.801; 53.252	4
Yvonne Hijgenaar	Women's 500 m time trial	35.418; 50.821	15

Individual Pursuit

Cyclist	Event	Qualification		Final	
Cyclist	Event	Time Speed (km/h)	Rank	Opponent Results	Rank
Levi Heimans	Men's individual pursuit	4:26.405; 54.053	15	Did not advance	15
Arno van der Zwet	Men's individual pursuit	4:26.677; 53.997	16	Did not advance	16
Ellen van Dijk	Women's individual pursuit	3:33.704; 50.537	5	Did not advance	5
Vera Koedooder	Women's individual pursuit	3:37.466; 49.662	8	Did not advance	8

Team pursuit

Cyclist	Event	Qualification		Final	
Cyclist	Event	Time Speed (km/h)	Rank	Opponent Results	Rank
Levi Heimans; Arno van der Zwet; Tim Veldt; Sipke Zijlstra	Men's team pursuit	4:04.818; 58.819	6	Did not advance	6
Ellen van Dijk; Amy Pieters; Vera Koedooder	Women's team pursuit	3:25.156 NR; 52.642	5	Did not advance	5

Team sprint

Cyclist	Event	Qualification		Final	
Cyclist	Event	Time Speed (km/h)	Rank	Opponent Results	Rank
Yondi Schmidt; Roy van den Berg; Teun Mulder	Men's team sprint	44.630; 60.497	8	Did not advance	8
Yvonne Hijgenaar; Willy Kanis	Women's team sprint	33.672; 53.456	7	Did not advance	7

Keirin

Cyclist	Event	1st Round	Repechage	2nd Round	Final
Cyclist	Event	Rank	Rank	Rank	Rank
Teun Mulder	Men's keirin	2 Q	BYE	2 Q	4
Roy van den Berg	Men's keirin	3 R	4	Did not advance	21
Yvonne Hijgenaar	Women's keirin	6 R	4	Did not advance	16
Willy Kanis	Women's keirin	4 R	1 Q	5	REL

Scratch

Cyclist	Event	Final
Cyclist	Event	Rank
Vera Koedooder	Women's scratch	12

Points race

Cyclist	Event	Final			
Cyclist	Event	Points	Laps	Finish order	Rank
Peter Schep	Men's points race	33	1	7	2nd place, silver medalist(s)
Ellen van Dijk	Women's points race	8	0	10	8

Madison

Cyclist	Event	Final			
Cyclist	Event	Points	Laps	Finish order	Rank
Peter Schep; Danny Stam	Madison	0	-1		11

Omnium

Cyclist	Event	Flying lap		Points race		Individual pursuit		Scratch race	Time trial		Total points	Rank
Cyclist	Event	Time	Rank	Points	Rank	Time	Rank	Rank	Time	Rank	Total points	Rank
Tim Veldt	Men's omnium	10.567	2	2	10	3:20.178	8	14	1:03.390	3	37	5
Yvonne Hijgenaar	Women's omnium	11.376	1	-17	11	2:26.529	10	7	35.040	1	30	4

== 2011 ==
The Netherlands competed at the 2011 UCI Track Cycling World Championships in Apeldoorn, the Netherlands, from 23 March to 27 March 2011. The event consisted of 19 different disciplines for elite men and women.

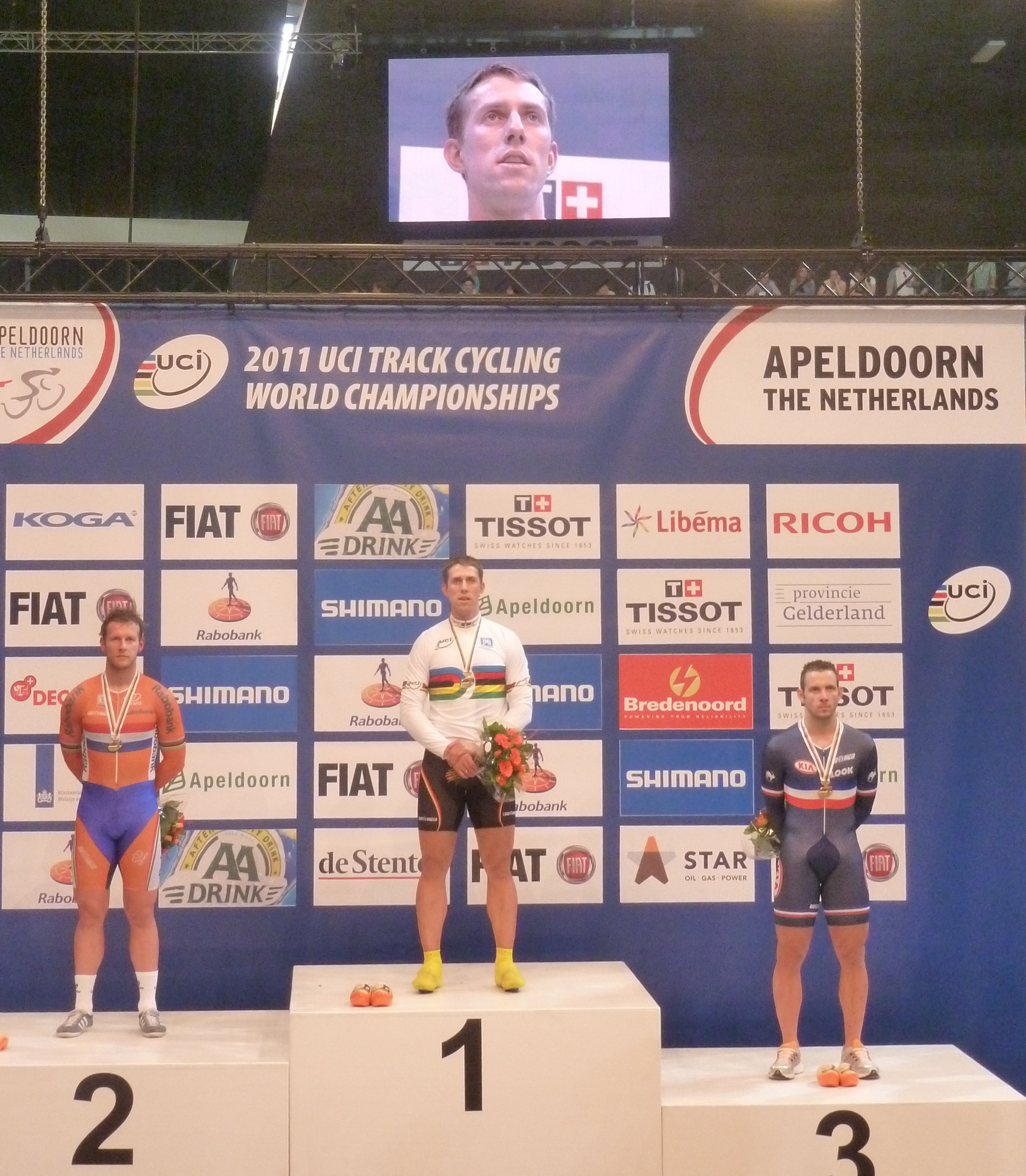
Teun Mulder (left) finished second in the 1 km time trial after winning the bronze medal in the keirin the day before.

Sprint

Cyclist	Event	Qualification		1/16 final	1/8 final	Repechage	Quarterfinals	Semifinals	Final	
Cyclist	Event	Time Speed (km/h)	Rank	Opposition Time Speed (km/h)	Opposition Time Speed (km/h)	Opposition Time Speed (km/h)	Opposition Time Speed (km/h)	Opposition Time Speed (km/h)	Opposition Time Speed (km/h)	Rank
Roy van den Berg	Men's sprint	10.462; 68.820	20	Michaël D'Almeida (FRA); L	did not advance					20
Matthijs Büchli	Men's sprint	10.779; 66.796	41	did not advance						41
Yvonne Hijgenaar	Women's sprint	11.594; 62.101	20	Simona Krupeckaitė (LTU); L	did not advance					20
Willy Kanis	Women's sprint	DNS		did not advance						-

Time trial

Cyclist	Event	Final	
Cyclist	Event	Time Speed (km/h)	Rank
Teun Mulder	Men's 1 km time trial	1:01.179; 58.843	2nd place, silver medalist(s)
Hugo Haak	Men's 1 km time trial	1:02.897; 57.236	9
Willy Kanis	Women's 500 m time trial	34.657; 51.937	4

Individual Pursuit

Cyclist	Event	Qualification		Final	
Cyclist	Event	Time Speed (km/h)	Rank	Opponent Results	Rank
Jenning Huizenga	Men's individual pursuit	4:30.687; 53.197	10	Did not advance	10
Levi Heimans	Men's individual pursuit	4:34.686; 52.423	14	Did not advance	14
Ellen van Dijk	Women's individual pursuit	3:40.751; 48.923	5	Did not advance	5

Team pursuit

Cyclist	Event	Qualification		Final	
Cyclist	Event	Time Speed (km/h)	Rank	Opponent Results	Rank
Levi Heimans; Jenning Huizenga; Arno van der Zwet; Tim Veldt	Men's team pursuit	4:06.552; 58.405	6	Did not advance	6
Ellen van Dijk; Kirsten Wild; Vera Koedooder	Women's team pursuit	3:26.092; 52.403	5	Did not advance	5

Team sprint

Cyclist	Event	Qualification		Final	
Cyclist	Event	Time Speed (km/h)	Rank	Opponent Results	Rank
Hugo Haak; Roy van den Berg; Teun Mulder	Men's team sprint	45.047; 59.937	7	Did not advance	7
Yvonne Hijgenaar; Willy Kanis	Women's team sprint	34.151; 52.707	7	Did not advance	7

Keirin

Cyclist	Event	1st Round	Repechage	2nd Round	Final
Cyclist	Event	Rank	Rank	Rank	Rank
Teun Mulder	Men's keirin	1 Q	BYE	2 Q	3rd place, bronze medalist(s)
Roy van den Berg	Men's keirin	4 R	5	Did not advance	31
Yvonne Hijgenaar	Women's keirin	5 R	3	Did not advance	17

Scratch

Cyclist	Event	Final
Cyclist	Event	Rank
Wim Stroetinga	Men's scratch	DNF
Marianne Vos	Women's scratch	1st place, gold medalist(s)

Points race

Cyclist	Event	Final			
Cyclist	Event	Points	Laps	Finish order	Rank
Peter Schep	Men's points race	13	0	12	6
Marianne Vos	Women's points race	7	0	14	7

Madison

Cyclist	Event	Final			
Cyclist	Event	Points	Laps	Finish order	Rank
Theo Bos; Peter Schep	Madison	21	-1	1	3rd place, bronze medalist(s)

Omnium

Cyclist	Event	Flying lap		Points race		Elimination race	Individual pursuit		Scratch race	Time trial		Total points	Rank
Cyclist	Event	Time	Rank	Points	Rank	Rank	Time	Rank	Rank	Time	Rank	Total points	Rank
Tim Veldt	Men's omnium	13.517	5	-20	20	18	4:35.933	9	15	1:04.093	2	69	14
Kirsten Wild	Women's omnium	14.796	4	12	5	3	3:43.167	9	5	37.557	16	42	3rd place, bronze medalist(s)

== 2015 ==
Netherlands competed at the 2015 UCI Track Cycling World Championships in Saint-Quentin-en-Yvelines at the Vélodrome de Saint-Quentin-en-Yvelines from 18 to 22 February 2015. A team of 13 cyclists (4 women, 9 men) was announced to represent the country in the event.

Men

Name	Event	Result	Rank
Jeffrey Hoogland	Men's sprint	9.692 (Q),	4
Hugo Haak	Men's sprint	10.088	29
Hugo Haak	Men's 1 km time trial	1:02.230	16
Tim Veldt	Men's scratch	—	15
Wim Stroetinga	Men's points race	5 points	15
Tim Veldt	Men's omnium	139 points	10
Matthijs Büchli	Men's keirin		9
Tim Veldt; Wim Stroetinga; Dion Beukeboom; Roy Eefting	Men's team pursuit	3:59.520 (q),	8
Matthijs Büchli; Hugo Haak; Jeffrey Hoogland	Men's team sprint	43.326	5

Women

Name	Event	Result	Rank
Elis Ligtlee	Women's sprint	10.732 (Q),	2nd place, silver medalist(s)
Yesna Rijkhoff	Women's sprint	11.266 (Q),	24
Elis Ligtlee	Women's 500 m time trial	33.775	4
Kirsten Wild	Women's points race	9 points	7
Kirsten Wild	Women's omnium	175 points	3rd place, bronze medalist(s)
Kirsten Wild	Women's scratch	—	1st place, gold medalist(s)
Shanne Braspennincx; Elis Ligtlee	Women's team sprint	33.463	5
Shanne Braspennincx	Women's keirin		2nd place, silver medalist(s)
Elis Ligtlee	Women's keirin		21

== 2016 ==
A team of 15 cyclists (4 women, 11 men) was announced to represent the country in the event. One of the entrants is Elis Ligtlee, a favourite in several sprint disciplines, who crashed at the Six days of Rotterdam in January. She had a concussion of the brain and bruises on her legs and hip but says she is fit for the World Championships. Also Theo Bos is part of the selection. After the 2008 Summer Olympics he changed from the track to the road. Two months before the 2016 World Track Championships he announced he returned to the track and wants to prove he is good enough to be part of the Dutch team for the 2016 Summer Olympics in the team sprint.

Men

Name(s)	Event	Result	Rank
Theo Bos	Men's 1 km time trial	1:00.461	2nd place, silver medalist(s)
Theo Bos	Men's sprint	10.047 (Q)	24
Dion Beukeboom	Men's individual pursuit	4:24.574	9
Jeffrey Hoogland	Men's sprint	9.767 (Q)	
Wim Stroetinga	Men's scratch	—	20
Nils van 't Hoenderdaal; Jeffrey Hoogland; Matthijs Büchli; Hugo Haak*	Men's team sprint	43.266	2nd place, silver medalist(s)
Roy Eefting; Wim Stroetinga; Joost van der Burg; Jan-Willem van Schip; Dion Beukeboom**	Men's team pursuit	4:01.847 (q)	8
Matthijs Büchli	Men's keirin	—	24
Dion Beukeboom; Wim Stroetinga	Men's madison	2 points (-2 laps down)	13

(*) Hugo Haak competed in the qualifications instead of Matthijs Büchli.
(**) Dion Beukeboom competed in the qualifications and first round instead of Joost van der Burg.

Women

Name(s)	Event	Result	Rank
Elis Ligtlee	Women's keirin	—	11
Elis Ligtlee	Women's sprint		13
Elis Ligtlee	Women's 500 m time trial	33.760	3rd place, bronze medalist(s)
Laurine van Riessen	Women's keirin	—	17
Laurine van Riessen	Women's sprint		10
Laurine van Riessen	Women's 500 m time trial	34.065	6
Kirsten Wild	Women's scratch	—	2nd place, silver medalist(s)
Kirsten Wild	Women's omnium	153 points	7
Laurine van Riessen; Elis Ligtlee	Women's team sprint	33.133	6

== See also ==
Other countries

- Australia at the UCI Track Cycling World Championships
- Cuba at the UCI Track Cycling World Championships

Netherlands at other UCI events

- Netherlands at the UCI Road World Championships
- Netherlands at the UCI Track Cycling World Cup Classics
