= 2011 UCI Track Cycling World Championships – Men's team sprint =

Rainbow jersey

The Men's team sprint at the 2011 UCI Track Cycling World Championships was held on March 23. 18 nations of 3 cyclists each participated in the contest. After the qualifying, the fastest 2 teams raced for gold, and 3rd and 4th teams raced for bronze.

In January 2012, the French team were stripped of their world title, following the nullification of Grégory Baugé's 2011 results after a 12-month backdated ban for drug test infringements.

== Results ==
=== Qualifying ===
Qualifying was held at 17:15.

Rank	Name	Nation	Time	Notes
1	Michaël D'Almeida; Grégory Baugé; Kévin Sireau	France	43.951	Q
2	René Enders; Maximilian Levy; Stefan Nimke	Germany	44.101	Q
3	Matthew Crampton; Chris Hoy; Jason Kenny	United Kingdom	44.128	q
4	Jason Niblett; Scott Sunderland; Dan Ellis	Australia	44.501	q
5	Sergey Kucherov; Denis Dmitriev; Pavel Yakushevskiy	Russia	44.805	
6	Sam Webster; Edward Dawkins; Ethan Mitchell	New Zealand	45.032	
7	Hugo Haak; Roy van den Berg; Teun Mulder	Netherlands	45.047	
8	Zhang Miao; Zhang Lei; Cheng Changsong	China	45.112	
9	Kamil Kuczyński; Damian Zieliński; Maciej Bielecki	Poland	45.217	
10	Kazuki Amagai; Yudai Nitta; Kazunari Watanabe	Japan	45.462	
11	Denis Špička; Tomáš Bábek; Adam Ptáčník	Czech Republic	45.913	
12	Dean Tracy; Michael Blatchford; Giddeon Massie	United States	46.190	
13	Juan Peralta Gascon; Ruben Donet Gregori; Itmar Esteban Herraiz	Spain	46.294	
14	Ángel Pulgar; César Marcano; Hersony Canelón	Venezuela	46.309	
15	Josiah Ng; Muhammad Md; Mohd Rizal Tisin	Malaysia	46.470	
16	Christian Tamayo; Rubén Murillo; Fabián Puerta	Colombia	46.589	
17	Konstantinos Christodoulou; Zafeirios Volikakis; Christos Volikakis	Greece	46.724	
18	Scott Mulder; Hugo Barrette; Thomas Hums	Canada	46.876	

=== Finals ===
The finals were held at 21:05.

Rank	Name	Nation	Time
Gold Medal Race
DSQ	Michaël D'Almeida; Grégory Baugé; Kévin Sireau	France	43.867
1st place, gold medalist(s)	René Enders; Maximilian Levy; Stefan Nimke	Germany	44.483
Bronze Medal Race
2nd place, silver medalist(s)	Matthew Crampton; Chris Hoy; Jason Kenny	United Kingdom	44.235
3rd place, bronze medalist(s)	Dan Ellis; Matthew Glaetzer; Jason Niblett	Australia	45.241
