= 2011 UCI Track Cycling World Championships – Men's keirin =

Rainbow jersey

The men's keirin at the 2011 UCI Track Cycling World Championships was held on 26 March. 33 athletes participated in the contest. After the six qualifying heats, the fastest rider in each heat advanced to the second round. The riders that did not advance to the second round raced in four repechage heats. The first rider in each heat advanced to the second round along with the eight that qualified before.

The first three riders from each of the two second round heats advanced to the final, and the remaining riders raced a consolation 7–12 place final.

== Results ==
=== First round ===
The first round was held at 10:00.

| Rank | Heat | Name | Nation | Notes |
|---|---|---|---|---|
| 1 | 1 | Chris Hoy | United Kingdom | Q |
| 2 | 1 | Jason Kenny | United Kingdom | |
| 3 | 1 | Edward Dawkins | New Zealand | |
| 4 | 1 | Kazunari Watanabe | Japan | |
| 5 | 1 | Sergey Borisov | Russia | |
| 1 | 2 | Maximilian Levy | Germany | Q |
| 2 | 2 | Juan Peralta Gascon | Spain | |
| 3 | 2 | Francesco Ceci | Italy | |
| 4 | 2 | Josiah Ng | Malaysia | |
| 5 | 2 | Kota Asai | Japan | |
| 1 | 3 | Teun Mulder | Netherlands | Q |
| 2 | 3 | Shane Perkins | Australia | |
| 3 | 3 | Fabián Puerta | Colombia | |
| 4 | 3 | Roy van den Berg | Netherlands | |
| 5 | 3 | Christos Volikakis | Greece | |
| 1 | 4 | Scott Sunderland | Australia | Q |
| 2 | 4 | François Pervis | France | |
| 3 | 4 | Hersony Canelón | Venezuela | |
| 4 | 4 | Adrian Tekliński | Poland | |
| 5 | 4 | Mohd Rizal Tisin | Malaysia | |
| 6 | 4 | Ross Edgar | United Kingdom | |
| 1 | 5 | Matthew Crampton | United Kingdom | Q |
| 2 | 5 | René Enders | Germany | |
| 3 | 5 | Jason Niblett | Australia | |
| 4 | 5 | Tang Qi | China | |
| 5 | 5 | Ángel Pulgar | Venezuela | |
| 6 | 5 | Kamil Kuczyński | Poland | |
| 1 | 6 | Mickaël Bourgain | France | Q |
| 2 | 6 | Denis Špička | Czech Republic | |
| 3 | 6 | Simon Van Velthooven | New Zealand | |
| 4 | 6 | Scott Mulder | Canada | |
| 5 | 6 | Tsubasa Kitatsuru | Japan | |
| 6 | 6 | Adam Ptáčník | Czech Republic | |

=== First round repechage ===
The first round repechage was held at 11:50.

| Rank | Heat | Name | Nation | Notes |
|---|---|---|---|---|
| 1 | 1 | Jason Kenny | United Kingdom | Q |
| 2 | 1 | Simon Van Velthooven | New Zealand | |
| 3 | 1 | Ross Edgar | United Kingdom | |
| 4 | 1 | Tang Qi | China | |
| 5 | 1 | Mohd Rizal Tisin | Malaysia | |
| 1 | 2 | Jason Niblett | Australia | Q |
| 2 | 2 | Christos Volikakis | Greece | |
| 3 | 2 | Adrian Tekliński | Poland | |
| 4 | 2 | Juan Peralta Gascon | Spain | |
| 5 | 2 | Kamil Kuczyński | Poland | |
| 1 | 3 | Shane Perkins | Australia | Q |
| 2 | 3 | Hersony Canelón | Venezuela | |
| 3 | 3 | Kota Asai | Japan | |
| 4 | 3 | Adam Ptáčník | Czech Republic | |
| 5 | 3 | Roy van den Berg | Netherlands | |
| 1 | 4 | François Pervis | France | Q |
| 2 | 4 | Josiah Ng | Malaysia | |
| 3 | 4 | Fabián Puerta | Colombia | |
| 4 | 4 | Sergey Borisov | Russia | |
| 1 | 5 | René Enders | Germany | Q |
| 2 | 5 | Kazunari Watanabe | Japan | |
| 3 | 5 | Francesco Ceci | Italy | |
| 4 | 5 | Tsubasa Kitatsuru | Japan | |
| 1 | 6 | Edward Dawkins | New Zealand | Q |
| 2 | 6 | Ángel Pulgar | Venezuela | |
| 3 | 6 | Scott Mulder | Canada | |
| — | 6 | Denis Špička | Czech Republic | REL |

=== Second round ===
The second round was held at 14:50.

| Rank | Heat | Name | Nation | Notes |
|---|---|---|---|---|
| 1 | 1 | Matthew Crampton | United Kingdom | Q |
| 2 | 1 | René Enders | Germany | Q |
| 3 | 1 | Chris Hoy | United Kingdom | Q |
| 4 | 1 | Scott Sunderland | Australia | |
| 5 | 1 | Jason Kenny | United Kingdom | |
| 6 | 1 | François Pervis | France | |
| 1 | 2 | Shane Perkins | Australia | Q |
| 2 | 2 | Teun Mulder | Netherlands | Q |
| 3 | 2 | Edward Dawkins | New Zealand | Q |
| 4 | 2 | Maximilian Levy | Germany | |
| 5 | 2 | Jason Niblett | Australia | |
| — | 2 | Mickaël Bourgain | France | REL |

=== Final 7–12 places ===
| Rank | Name | Nation | Notes |
|---|---|---|---|
| 7 | Scott Sunderland | Australia | |
| 8 | Jason Niblett | Australia | |
| 9 | Mickaël Bourgain | France | |
| 10 | Jason Kenny | United Kingdom | |
| 11 | Maximilian Levy | Germany | |
| 12 | François Pervis | France | |

=== Final ===
The finals were held at 16:10.

| Rank | Name | Nation | Notes |
|---|---|---|---|
| 1st place, gold medalist(s) | Shane Perkins | Australia | |
| 2nd place, silver medalist(s) | Chris Hoy | United Kingdom | |
| 3rd place, bronze medalist(s) | Teun Mulder | Netherlands | |
| 4 | Matthew Crampton | United Kingdom | |
| 5 | René Enders | Germany | |
| 6 | Edward Dawkins | New Zealand | |
