= 2007 Masters of Sprint =

The 2007 Masters of Sprint was held on 6 January 2007 in Rotterdam Ahoy Sportpaleis in Rotterdam. The event was held for the first time and scheduled in between the 2007 Six Days of Rotterdam. Nine of the world's best track sprint cyclists challenged each other to crown the Master of Sprint at the end of the day.

== Results ==
=== 200 metre time trial ===
The riders started with a 200-metre time trial to place them into three series of three riders who were facing each other.

No.	Rider	Time	Serie
1	(Netherlands) Theo Bos	10.702	1
2	(Netherlands) Tim Veldt	10.723	3
3	(Scotland) Craig MacLean	10.845	2
4	(France) Arnaud Tournant	10.866	1
5	(Netherlands) Teun Mulder	10.946	2
6	(France) François Pervis	10.993	3
7	(Italy) Roberto Chiappa	10.998	1
8	(Germany) Jan van Eijden	11.134	2
9	(Netherlands) Yondi Schmidt	11.243	3

=== Series ===
In the series three riders faced each other in a sprint competition, with the winner qualifying automatically for the semi-finals, while the others were forced to ride the repechages first.

No.	Serie 1	Result
1	(Netherlands) Theo Bos	Semi final
2	(France) Arnaud Tournant	Repechage
3	(Italy) Roberto Chiappa	Repechage

No.	Serie 2	Result
1	(Scotland) Craig MacLean	Semi final
2	(Netherlands) Teun Mulder	Repechage
3	(Germany) Jan van Eijden	Repechage

No.	Serie 3	Result
1	(Netherlands) Tim Veldt	Semi final
2	(France) François Pervis	Repechage
3	(Netherlands) Yondi Schmidt	Repechage

=== Repechages ===
The losing riders of the series entered the repechages in three series of two riders, with the winners eventually qualifying for the semi-finals.

No.	Repechage 1	Result
1	(Italy) Roberto Chiappa	Semi final
2	(Germany) Jan van Eijden	7th-9th

No.	Repechage 2	Result
1	(Netherlands) Teun Mulder	Semi final
2	(Netherlands) Yondi Schmidt	7th-9th

No.	Repechage 3	Result
1	(France) Arnaud Tournant	Semi final
2	(France) François Pervis	7th-9th

=== Semi finals ===
The semi finals existed of two series with three riders. The winners both qualified for the final, while those crossing the line in second position would be fighting for the bronze medal. The third finishers met each other in the fifth place decider.

No.	Semi final 1	Result
1	(Netherlands) Theo Bos	Final
2	(France) Arnaud Tournant	3rd-4th
3	(Netherlands) Teun Mulder	5th-6th

No.	Semi final 2	Result
1	(Scotland) Craig MacLean	Final
2	(Italy) Roberto Chiappa	3rd-4th
3	(Netherlands) Tim Veldt	5th-6th

=== Finals ===
In the finals Theo Bos outsprinted Craig McLean to become Master of Sprint. Arnaud Tournant claimed the bronze medal in his confrontation with Roberto Chiappa.

No.	7th-9th position	Result
1	(France) François Pervis	7th
2	(Germany) Jan van Eijden	8th
3	(Netherlands) Yondi Schmidt	9th

No.	5th-6th position	Result
1	(Netherlands) Teun Mulder	5th
2	(Netherlands) Tim Veldt	6th

No.	3rd-4th position	Result
1	(France) Arnaud Tournant	3rd
2	(Italy) Roberto Chiappa	4th

No.	1st-2nd position	Result
1	(Netherlands) Theo Bos	1st
2	(Scotland) Craig MacLean	2nd
