= Cycling at the 2004 Summer Olympics – Men's track time trial =

Cycling at the Olympics

Men's track time trial at the Games of the XXVIII Olympiad
- Athens Olympic Velodrome
- Venue: Athens Olympic Velodrome
- Date: 13 August
- Competitors: 17 from 13 nations
- Winning time: 1:00.711 OR

Medalists
1st place, gold medalist(s)		Chris Hoy; Great Britain
2nd place, silver medalist(s)		Arnaud Tournant; France
3rd place, bronze medalist(s)		Stefan Nimke; Germany

The men's track time trial in Cycling at the 2004 Summer Olympics was a time trial race in which each of the 17 cyclists from 13 nations attempted to set the fastest time for four laps (1 kilometre) of the track. Nations were limited to two cyclists each. The event was won by Chris Hoy of Great Britain, the nation's second consecutive victory in the men's track time trial (moving Great Britain into a five-way tie for second-most all-time at two). Arnaud Tournant of France earned silver after a disappointing fifth-place finish four years earlier. Stefan Nimke put Germany on the podium for the second consecutive Games with his bronze.

== Background ==
This was the 19th appearance of the event, which had previously been held in 1896 and every Games since 1928. It was also the last appearance, as the event was cancelled to make room on the programme for BMX events.

The returning cyclists from 2000 were silver medalist Stefan Nimke of Germany, bronze medalist (and 1992 silver medalist and 1996 competitor) Shane Kelly of Australia, fifth-place finisher Arnaud Tournant of France, sixth-place finisher Dimitrios Georgalis of Greece, and seventh-place finisher Grzegorz Krejner of Poland. Georgalis and Krejner had competed in 1996 as well. The field included every world championship winner since 1995: Kelly (1995, 1996, 1997), Tournant (1998, 1999, 2000, 2001), Chris Hoy of Great Britain (2002, 2004), and Nimke (2003). Tournant also held the world record.

For the only time in the event's history, no nations made their debut. France made its 19th appearance, the only nation to have competed at every appearance of the event.

== Competition format ==
The event was a time trial on the track, with each cyclist competing separately to attempt to achieve the fastest time. Each cyclist raced one kilometre from a standing start.

== Records ==
The following were the world and Olympic records prior to the competition.

World record	Arnaud Tournant (FRA)	58.875	La Paz, Bolivia	10 October 2001
Olympic record	Jason Queally (GBR)	1:01.609	Sydney, Australia	16 September 2000

Arnaud Tournant broke the Olympic record with a time of 1:00.896. Stefan Nimke and Shane Kelly also beat the old Olympic record, but raced after Tournant and did not beat his new mark. Chris Hoy, racing last, did beat Tournant's mark with a new record of 1:00.711.

== Schedule ==
All times are Greece Standard Time (UTC+2)

Date	Time	Round
Friday, 20 August 2004	17:55	Final

== Results ==
The Olympic Record was broken four times, the final time by Chris Hoy of Great Britain retaining the title that Jason Queally had won in Sydney four years earlier.

Rank	Race number	Cyclist	Nation	250 m	500 m	750 m	Time	Notes
1st place, gold medalist(s)	58	Chris Hoy	Great Britain	17.984	31.414	45.505	1:00.711	OR
2nd place, silver medalist(s)	54	Arnaud Tournant	France	18.057	31.555	45.576	1:00.896	
3rd place, bronze medalist(s)	73	Stefan Nimke	Germany	18.487	31.919	46.027	1:01.186	
4	7	Shane Kelly	Australia	18.351	31.861	46.057	1:01.224	
5	101	Theo Bos	Netherlands	18.697	32.356	46.684	1:01.986	
6	52	François Pervis	France	18.353	32.087	46.570	1:02.328	
7	59	Craig MacLean	Great Britain	18.445	32.367	46.611	1:02.369	
8	68	Carsten Bergemann	Germany	18.901	32.850	47.272	1:02.551	
9	28	Ahmed López	Cuba	18.272	31.855	46.436	1:02.739	
10	30	Alois Kaňkovský	Czech Republic	18.903	32.625	47.152	1:03.038	
11	105	Teun Mulder	Netherlands	18.591	32.446	47.084	1:03.165	
12	35	Ruben Donet	Spain	18.683	32.725	47.391	1:03.505	
13	24	Wilson Meneses	Colombia	18.713	32.700	47.505	1:03.614	
14	120	Grzegorz Krejner	Poland	19.083	33.112	47.929	1:03.923	
15	76	Dimitrios Georgalis	Greece	18.852	32.943	48.002	1:04.204	
16	137	Lin Chih-hsun	Chinese Taipei	19.716	34.503	49.800	1:06.240	
17	21	Radoslav Konstantinov	Bulgaria	19.377	33.976	49.474	1:06.265	

== See also ==
- Track time trial
- Cycling at the 2004 Summer Olympics – Women's track time trial
- Cycling at the 2008 Summer Olympics – Men's BMX
