= Glasspool =

Glasspool is a surname. Notable people with the surname include:

- James Glasspool (born 1991), Australian road racing cyclist
- Lloyd Glasspool (born 1993), British tennis player
- Mary Glasspool (born 1954), American Episcopal bishop
- Parry Glasspool (born 1992), British actor
- Richard Glasspool (1884–1949), British businessman and philanthropist
