= 2011 UCI Track Cycling World Championships – Men's 1 km time trial =

Men's 1 km time trial at the 2011 UCI Track Cycling World Championships
- Venue: Omnisport Apeldoorn
- Location: Apeldoorn, Netherlands
- Dates: 27 March 2011
- Winning time: 1:00.793

Medalists
gold medal	Stefan Nimke	Germany
silver medal	Teun Mulder	Netherlands
bronze medal	François Pervis	France

The Men's 1 km time trial at the 2011 UCI Track Cycling World Championships was held on March 27. 21 athletes participated in the contest.

== Results ==
The race was held at 13:30.

Rank	Name	Nation	Time
1st place, gold medalist(s)	Stefan Nimke	Germany	1:00.793
2nd place, silver medalist(s)	Teun Mulder	Netherlands	1:01.179
3rd place, bronze medalist(s)	François Pervis	France	1:01.228
4	Michaël D'Almeida	France	1:01.481
5	Joachim Eilers	Germany	1:02.296
6	Quentin Lafargue	France	1:02.582
7	Tomáš Bábek	Czech Republic	1:02.788
8	Andrey Kubeev	Russia	1:02.838
9	Hugo Haak	Netherlands	1:02.897
10	Edward Dawkins	New Zealand	1:03.534
11	Mohd Rizal Tisin	Malaysia	1:03.651
12	Fabián Puerta	Colombia	1:03.653
13	Kamil Kuczyński	Poland	1:03.791
14	Yevhen Bolibrukh	Ukraine	1:03.846
15	Adrian Tekliński	Poland	1:04.086
16	Yudai Nitta	Japan	1:04.201
17	Nikolay Zhurkin	Russia	1:04.312
18	Ángel Pulgar	Venezuela	1:05.083
19	Francesco Ceci	Italy	1:05.193
20	Muhd Amran	Malaysia	1:08.450
–	Simon Van Velthooven	New Zealand	DNS

== See also ==
- 2011 UCI Para-cycling Track World Championships – Men's 1 km time trial
