= 2012 UCI Track Cycling World Championships – Men's 1 km time trial =

Men's 1 km time trial at the 2012 UCI Track Cycling World Championships
- Venue: Melbourne Park Multi-Purpose Venue
- Location: Melbourne, Australia
- Dates: 5 April 2012
- Winning time: 1:00.082

Medalists
gold medal	Stefan Nimke	Germany
silver medal	Michael D'Almeida	France
bronze medal	Simon van Velthooven	New Zealand

The Men's time trial at the 2012 UCI Track Cycling World Championships was held on April 5. 27 athletes participated in the contest.

== Results ==
The race was held at 20:40.

Rank	Name	Nation	Time
1st place, gold medalist(s)	Stefan Nimke	Germany	1:00.082
2nd place, silver medalist(s)	Michael D'Almeida	France	1:00.509
3rd place, bronze medalist(s)	Simon van Velthooven	New Zealand	1:00.543
4	François Pervis	France	1:01.106
5	Teun Mulder	Netherlands	1:01.365
6	Quentin Lafargue	France	1:02.009
7	Joachim Eilers	Germany	1:02.119
8	Hugo Haak	Netherlands	1:02.162
9	James Glasspool	Australia	1:02.165
10	Steven Burke	United Kingdom	1:02.180
11	Zhang Miao	China	1:02.203
12	Yudai Nitta	Japan	1:02.623
13	Juan Peralta	Spain	1:02.704
14	Bernard Esterhuizen	South Africa	1:02.915
15	Kamil Kuczyński	Poland	1:02.930
16	Adrian Tekliński	Poland	1:03.468
17	Filip Ditzel	Czech Republic	1:03.525
18	Fabián Puerta	Colombia	1:03.554
19	Lucas Liß	Germany	1:04.216
20	Tang Qi	China	1:04.354
21	Francesco Ceci	Italy	1:04.557
22	Alex Frame	New Zealand	1:04.794
23	Muhammad Md Yunos	Malaysia	1:05.280
24	Alexander Quincy	Trinidad and Tobago	1:05.850
25	Ángel Pulgar	Venezuela	1:06.333
26	Kwok Ho Ting	Hong Kong	1:06.942
	Seiichiro Nakagawa	Japan	DNS
