= 2009 UCI Track Cycling World Championships – Men's keirin =

Men's keirin at the 2009 UCI Track Cycling World Championships
- Venue: BGŻ Arena, Pruszków
- Date: 26 March 2009

The Men's keirin event of the 2009 UCI Track Cycling World Championships was held on 26 March 2009.

== Results ==
=== Round 1 ===
Heat	Rank	Name	Nation	Note
1	1	Carsten Bergemann	Germany	Q
	2	Teun Mulder	Netherlands	Q
	3	Jason Kenny	Great Britain	
	4	Daniel Ellis	Australia	
	5	Adam Ptáčník	Czech Republic	
	6	Andrii Vynokurov	Ukraine	
2	1	Maximilian Levy	Germany	Q
	2	Shane Perkins	Australia	Q
	3	Kamil Kuczyński	Poland	
	4	Christos Volikakis	Greece	
	5	Josiah Ng Onn Lam	Malaysia	
	6	Leonardo Narváez	Colombia	
3	1	Sergey Borisov	Russia	Q
	2	Azizulhasni Awang	Malaysia	Q
	3	Christopher Sellier	Trinidad and Tobago	
	4	José Antonio Escuredo	Spain	
	5	Matthew Crampton	Great Britain	
	6	Simon Van Velthooven	New Zealand	
4	1	François Pervis	France	Q
	2	Jason Niblett	Australia	Q
	3	Travis Smith	Canada	
	4	Yondi Schmidt	Netherlands	
	5	Ross Edgar	Great Britain	
	6	Tomokazu Sato	Japan	

==== Round 1 repechage ====
Heat	Rank	Name	Nation	Note
1	1	Matthew Crampton	Great Britain	Q
	2	Jason Kenny	Great Britain	
	3	Yondi Schmidt	Netherlands	
	4	Leonardo Narváez	Colombia	
	5	Kévin Sireau	France	
2	1	Josiah Ng Onn Lam	Malaysia	Q
	2	José Antonio Escuredo	Spain	
	3	Kamil Kuczyński	Poland	
	4	Andrii Vynokurov	Ukraine	
	5	Barry Forde	Barbados	
3	1	Christos Volikakis	Greece	Q
	2	Adam Ptáčník	Czech Republic	
	3	Christopher Sellier	Trinidad and Tobago	
	4	Tomokazu Sato	Japan	
	5	Kazunari Watanabe	Japan	
4	1	Ross Edgar	Great Britain	Q
	2	Hodei Mazquiarán Uría	Spain	
	3	Simon Van Velthooven	New Zealand	
	4	Daniel Ellis	Australia	
	5	Travis Smith	Canada	

=== Round 2 ===
Heat	Rank	Name	Nation	Note
1	1	François Pervis	France	Q
	2	Matthew Crampton	Great Britain	Q
	3	Ross Edgar	Great Britain	Q
	4	Azizulhasni Awang	Malaysia	
	5	Shane Perkins	Australia	
	6	Carsten Bergemann	Germany	
2	1	Maximilian Levy	Germany	Q
	2	Sergey Borisov	Russia	Q
	3	Teun Mulder	Netherlands	Q
	4	Josiah Ng Onn Lam	Malaysia	
	5	Christos Volikakis	Greece	
	6	Jason Niblett	Australia	

=== Finals ===
==== Gold medal race ====
Heat	Rank	Name	Nation	Note
1	Maximilian Levy	Germany		
2	François Pervis	France		
3	Teun Mulder	Netherlands		
4	Ross Edgar	Great Britain		
5	Matthew Crampton	Great Britain		
6	Sergey Borisov	Russia		

==== Race for 7th-12th place ====
Rank	Name	Nation	Note
7	Shane Perkins	Australia	
8	Carsten Bergemann	Germany	
9	Christos Volikakis	Greece	
10	Josiah Ng Onn Lam	Malaysia	
11	Azizulhasni Awang	Malaysia	
12	Jason Niblett	Australia	
