= 2010 UCI Track Cycling World Championships – Men's 1 km time trial =

Men's 1 km time trial at the 2010 UCI Track Cycling World Championships
- Venue: Ballerup Super Arena
- Location: Ballerup, Denmark
- Dates: 26 March 2010
- Winning time: 1:00.341

Medalists
gold medal	Teun Mulder	Netherlands
silver medal	Michaël D'Almeida	France
bronze medal	François Pervis	France

The men's 1 km time trial was one of the 10 men's events at the 2010 UCI Track Cycling World Championships, held in Ballerup, Denmark.

25 Cyclists from 17 countries participated in the contest. The Final was held on 26 March.

== World record ==
World Record
WR	58.875	Arnaud Tournant (FRA)	La Paz (Bolivia)	10 October 2001

== Final ==
Rank	Name	Nation	Time
1st place, gold medalist(s)	Teun Mulder	Netherlands	1:00.341
2nd place, silver medalist(s)	Michaël D'Almeida	France	1:00.884
3rd place, bronze medalist(s)	François Pervis	France	1:01.024
4	Stefan Nimke	Germany	1:01.086
5	Edward Dawkins	New Zealand	1:01.372
6	Zhang Miao	China	1:01.520
7	David Daniell	Great Britain	1:02.033
8	Scott Sunderland	Australia	1:02.291
9	Tomáš Bábek	Czech Republic	1:02.940
10	David Alonso Castillo	Spain	1:03.004
11	Yevgen Bolibrukh	Ukraine	1:03.038
12	Kamil Kuczyński	Poland	1:03.056
13	René Enders	Germany	1:03.058
14	Quentin Lafargue	France	1:03.100
15	Wang Chongyang	China	1:03.140
16	Ethan Mitchell	New Zealand	1:03.389
17	Joachim Eilers	Germany	1:03.503
18	Nikolay Zhurkin	Russia	1:03.525
19	Adrian Tekliński	Poland	1:03.568
20	Myron Simpson	New Zealand	1:03.691
21	Yudai Nitta	Japan	1:03.762
22	Clemens Selzer	Austria	1:03.766
23	Francesco Ceci	Italy	1:04.101
24	Philip Nielsen	Denmark	1:04.609
	Giddeon Massie	United States	DSQ
