= Malaysia at the 2011 Commonwealth Youth Games =

- CGF code: MAS
- CGA: Olympic Council of Malaysia

in Isle of Man
- Competitors: 18 in 4 sports
- Medals Ranked 8th: Gold 4 Silver 2 Bronze 1 Total 7

Commonwealth Youth Games appearances
- 2000; 2004; 2008; 2011; 2015; 2017; 2023

Malaysia participated in the 2011 Commonwealth Youth Games held in the British Crown Dependency of Isle of Man from 7 to 13 September 2011. Their participation marked their fourth Commonwealth Youth Games appearance, one of the highest among the Commonwealth of Nations. Malaysia was represented by the Olympic Council of Malaysia, which is responsible for Malaysian participation in the multi-sport events, including Commonwealth Games and Commonwealth Youth Games. Malaysian delegation consisted of 18 athletes competed in four different sports— athletics, badminton, cycling, and swimming. This was an increase in the number of athletes from the nation's last appearance at the Games, when 10 athletes were sent to the 2008 Commonwealth Youth Games in Pune. Malaysia dominated in the badminton events, winning all but one of the five gold medals on offer, the only other gold was won by P. V. Sindhu of India in women's singles. All the medals came from badminton.

== Background ==
Malaysia became a member of the Commonwealth of Nations in 1957, and debuted in the Commonwealth Games, the then British Empire and Commonwealth Games, in 1966 in Kingston, Jamaica. Malaysia has competed at every edition of the Games. It entered 10 athletes (five men and five women) in the 2008 Commonwealth Youth Games in Pune, India, competed in athletes and badminton. Malaysian contingents won a total of 13 medals in Pune, including three gold and four silver, leading to the country finishing seventh in the final medal table standings.

== Medallists ==
Medal	Name	Sport	Event	Date
Gold	Zulfadli Zulkiffli	Badminton	Boys' singles	11 September
Gold	Nelson Heg Wei Keat; Teo Ee Yi	Badminton	Boys' doubles	11 September
Gold	Chow Mei Kuan; Lee Meng Yean	Badminton	Girls' doubles	11 September
Gold	Teo Ee Yi; Chow Mei Kuan	Badminton	Mixed doubles	11 September
Silver	Sonia Cheah Su Ya	Badminton	Girls' singles	11 September
Silver	Sonia Cheah Su Ya; Yang Li Lian	Badminton	Girls' doubles	11 September
Bronze	Nelson Heg Wei Keat; Lee Meng Yean	Badminton	Mixed doubles	11 September

== Athletics ==
Boys
Track events

Athlete	Event	Heats			Semifinal			Final	
Athlete	Event	Result	Rank	Overall rank	Result	Rank	Overall rank	Result	Rank
Harith Ammar Mohd Sobri	100 m	11.28	5	19	did not advance				
Alif Ashraf Mohd Razali	110 m hurdles	14.13	3 Q	7	—			14.06	4

== Cycling ==
=== Road ===
Athletes	Event	Time	Rank
Hamdan Hamidun	Boys' individual road race	+5 laps	35
Muhd Arfy Qhairant Amran	Boys' individual road race	did not finish	
Hamdan Hamidun	Boys' individual time trial	10:37	28
Muhd Arfy Qhairant Amran	Boys' individual time trial	10:54	33
Hamdan Hamidun; Muhd Arfy Qhairant Amran	Boys' team time trial	21:31	11
Hamdan Hamidun	Boys' criterium	+31 laps	24
Muhd Arfy Qhairant Amran	Boys' criterium	+38 laps	34
Jupha Somnet	Girls' individual road race	1:08.02	8
Nurul Nadia Mohamad Fauzi	Girls' individual road race	+1 laps	17
Jupha Somnet	Girls' individual time trial	12:32	16
Nurul Nadia Mohamad Fauzi	Girls' individual time trial	12:42	17
Jupha Somnet; Nurul Nadia Mohamad Fauzi	Girls' team time trial	25:14	6
Jupha Somnet	Girls' criterium	+1 laps	11
Nurul Nadia Mohamad Fauzi	Girls' criterium	+6 laps	16

== Swimming ==
Boys

Athlete	Event	Heat		Final	
Athlete	Event	Time	Rank	Time	Rank
Tern Jian Han	200 m freestyle	1:57.85	18	did not advance	
Tern Jian Han	50 m backstroke	26.61	9	did not advance	
Tern Jian Han	100 m backstroke	57.14	9	did not advance	
Tern Jian Han	200 m backstroke	2:03.17	8 Q	2:04.68	8
Chi Chia Khian	50 m butterfly	26.12	10	did not advance	
Chi Chia Khian	100 m butterfly	56.47	7 Q	56.07	6
Tern Jian Han	100 m butterfly	55.76	5 Q	56.04	5
Chi Chia Khian	200 m butterfly	2:14.90	10 Q	Disqualified	
Tern Jian Han	200 m butterfly	2:06.25	7 Q	2:05.53	6

Girls

Athlete	Event	Heat		Final	
Athlete	Event	Time	Rank	Time	Rank
Erika Kong Chia Chia	50 m breaststroke	33.82	7 Q	32.68	5
Erika Kong Chia Chia	100 m breaststroke	1:12.03	9	did not advance	
Erika Kong Chia Chia	200 m breaststroke	2:38.04	8 Q	2:35.05	7
Hii Siew Siew	50 m butterfly	31.79	16	did not advance	
Hii Siew Siew	100 m butterfly	1:08.73	12	did not advance	
Hii Siew Siew	200 m butterfly	2:31.98	10	did not advance	
Erika Kong Chia Chia	200 m individual medley	2:22.56	11	did not advance	
