= 2013 UCI Track Cycling World Championships – Men's 1 km time trial =

Cycling Championship

Men's 1 km time trial at the 2013 UCI Track Cycling World Championships
- Venue: Minsk-Arena
- Location: Minsk, Belarus
- Dates: 20 February 2013
- Winning time: 1:00.221

Medalists
gold medal	François Pervis	France
silver medal	Simon van Velthooven	New Zealand
bronze medal	Joachim Eilers	Germany

The Men's time trial at the 2013 UCI Track Cycling World Championships was held on February 20. There were a total of 19 athletes who participated in the contest.

== Results ==
The race was held at 19:15.

Rank	Name	Nation	Time
1st place, gold medalist(s)	François Pervis	France	1:00.221
2nd place, silver medalist(s)	Simon van Velthooven	New Zealand	1:00.869
3rd place, bronze medalist(s)	Joachim Eilers	Germany	1:01.450
4	Kian Emadi	United Kingdom	1:01.756
5	Eric Engler	Germany	1:01.762
6	Teun Mulder	Netherlands	1:01.998
7	Hugo Haak	Netherlands	1:02.175
8	Edward Dawkins	New Zealand	1:02.212
9	Francesco Ceci	Italy	1:02.703
10	Krzysztof Maksel	Poland	1:02.711
11	Yudai Nitta	Japan	1:02.934
12	Quentin Lafargue	France	1:03.030
13	Andrey Kubeev	Russia	1:03.438
14	Robin Wagner	Czech Republic	1:03.640
15	Tomáš Bábek	Czech Republic	1:03.769
16	Gennadii Genus	Ukraine	1:03.819
17	José Moreno Sánchez	Spain	1:03.957
18	Chun Wing Leung	Hong Kong	1:05.078
19	Sergio Aliaga Chivite	Spain	1:05.425
