= 2011 UCI Track Cycling World Championships – Men's scratch =

Rainbow jersey

The Men's scratch at the 2011 UCI Track Cycling World Championships was held on March 23. 21 athletes participated in the scratch race. The competition consisted of 60 laps, making a total of 15 km.

== Results ==
The race was held at 20:55.

Rank	Name	Nation	Laps down
1st place, gold medalist(s)	Kwok Ho Ting	Hong Kong	
2nd place, silver medalist(s)	Elia Viviani	Italy	
3rd place, bronze medalist(s)	Morgan Kneisky	France	
4	Carlos Urán	Colombia	
5	Unai Elorriaga Zubiaur	Spain	
6	Martin Bláha	Czech Republic	
7	Cameron Meyer	Australia	
8	Nicky Cocquyt	Belgium	
9	Andreas Müller	Austria	
10	Rafał Ratajczyk	Poland	
11	Bobby Lea	United States	
–	Ralf Matzka	Germany	DNF
–	Wim Stroetinga	Netherlands	DNF
–	Tristan Marguet	Switzerland	DNF
–	Berik Kupeshov	Kazakhstan	DNF
–	Kazuhiro Mori	Japan	DNF
–	Turakit Boonratanathanakorn	Thailand	DNF
–	Cristopher Mansilla	Chile	DNF
–	Sam Harrison	United Kingdom	DNF
–	Ivan Savitskiy	Russia	DNF
–	Muhd Amran	Malaysia	DNF
