= Konstantinos Christodoulou =

Greek cyclist (born 1986)

Personal information
- Born: 28 February 1986 (age 40)

Cycling career
- Sport: Cycling
- Discipline: Track cycling
- Role: Rider
- Rider type: sprinter

Konstantinos Christodoulou (born 28 February 1986) is a Greek male track cyclist, riding for the national team. He competed in the sprint and team sprint event at the 2011 UCI Track Cycling World Championships.
