= 2014 UCI Track Cycling World Championships – Men's 1 km time trial =

Men's 1 km time trial at the 2014 UCI Track Cycling World Championships
- Venue: Velódromo Alcides Nieto Patiño
- Location: Cali, Colombia
- Dates: 28 February 2014
- Winning time: 59.385

Medalists
gold medal	François Pervis	France
silver medal	Joachim Eilers	Germany
bronze medal	Simon van Velthooven	New Zealand

The Men's 1 km time trial at the 2014 UCI Track Cycling World Championships was held on 28 February 2014. 15 cyclists participated in the contest.

== Results ==
The race was started at 18:30.

Rank	Name	Nation	Time	Notes
1st place, gold medalist(s)	François Pervis	France	59.385	
2nd place, silver medalist(s)	Joachim Eilers	Germany	59.984	
3rd place, bronze medalist(s)	Simon van Velthooven	New Zealand	1:00.518	
4	Krzysztof Maksel	Poland	1:00.533	
5	Hugo Haak	Netherlands	1:01.076	
6	Fabián Puerta	Colombia	1:01.110	
7	Michaël D'Almeida	France	1:01.154	
8	Eric Engler	Germany	1:01.327	
9	Tomáš Bábek	Czech Republic	1:01.924	
10	Andrey Kubeev	Russia	1:02.024	
11	Hodei Mazquiarán	Spain	1:02.041	
12	Kian Emadi	Great Britain	1:02.220	
13	Bernard Esterhuizen	South Africa	1:02.546	
14	Roberto Serrano	Mexico	1:02.968	
15	Seiichiro Nakagawa	Japan	1:03.110	
