= Ruben Donet =

Spanish cyclist

Personal information
- Nickname: Ruben Donet Gregori
- Born: 3 April 1983 (age 43)

Cycling career
- Sport: Cycling
- Discipline: Track cycling
- Role: Rider
- Rider type: team sprint
Medal record
Men's track cycling
Representing Spain
European Junior Track Championships
Silver medal – second place	2001 Fiorenzuola	1 km time trial

Ruben Donet Gregori (born 3 April 1983) is a Spanish male track cyclist, riding for the national team. Also known as Tío Cadenas, he competed in the track time trial event at the 2004 Summer Olympics. He also competed at the 2007 UCI Track Cycling World Championships and 2011 UCI Track Cycling World Championships.
