= Glasspool Trust =

British charitable trust

Glasspool Charity Trust
- Named after: Richard Louveteau Glasspool
- Formation: 1939
- Founder: Richard Louveteau Glasspool
- Headquarters: Mainyard Studios, Ruckholt Road, Leyton London
- Region served: United Kingdom
- Chief Executive: Rachael Badger
- Chair of Trustees: Kerri Phillips
- Staff: 5
- Volunteers: 8
- Website: www.glasspool.org.uk

R L Glasspool Charity Trust, known as Glasspool, is a British charitable trust established in 1939 by businessman and philanthropist Richard Louveteau Glasspool.

== History ==
The organisation was founded in 1939 by a wealthy businessman Richard Louveteau Glasspool. Glasspool decided that it would be more cost-effective to establish his own charity, thereby reducing his income tax liabilities.

== Mission ==
The Trust describes its aim as "the relief of persons who are in need, hardship or distress; or sick, convalescent, disabled or infirm". The Trust assists such individuals and families by providing grants of financial assistance; providing goods, services and facilities; and making grants to other organisations with similar aims. More than 86% of the grants made in 2012/13 were made to those receiving social welfare benefits.

== Controversy ==
In 2016, the Trust attracted controversy after selling 63 investment properties it owned in Walthamstow to a newly formed property investment company, which took steps soon after the sale to evict some of the established tenants, and re-sold two of the properties in February 2016. Tenants argued that the Trust had failed to give them an opportunity to purchase the properties they were renting before selling the properties. The Charity Commission subsequently launched an investigation into the sale amid concerns the Trust might have breached obligations to dispose of charity assets for a fair market price. The Guardian suggested the terms of the sales meant the charity "could have lost more than £3m, or almost twice the total it awarded in charitable grants last year".

During what was described by The Guardian as a 'bad tempered' meeting with the Labour MP for Walthamstow, Stella Creasy, Dr Keith Nunn, the Glasspool Trust Chair of Trustees, was accused by Creasey of making dismissive remarks about the effected tenants. Creasy was reported to have ended the meeting and asked a police officer to escort Nunn out of the Palace of Westminster as he was 'no longer welcome'.
