= Lin Chih-hsun =

Taiwanese cyclist

Personal information
- Born: 4 December 1980 (age 45)

Cycling career
- Sport: Cycling

Lin Chih-hsun (born 4 December 1980) is a Taiwanese cyclist. He competed in the men's track time trial at the 2004 Summer Olympics.
