= Thomas Hums =

Canadian cyclist

Personal information
- Born: 15 August 1989 (age 37)

Cycling career
- Sport: Cycling
- Discipline: Track cycling
- Role: Rider
- Rider type: team sprint

Thomas Hums (born 15 August 1989) is a Canadian male track cyclist, riding for the national team. He competed in the team sprint event at the 2011 UCI Track Cycling World Championships.
