= Stefan Nimke =

German cyclist (born 1978)

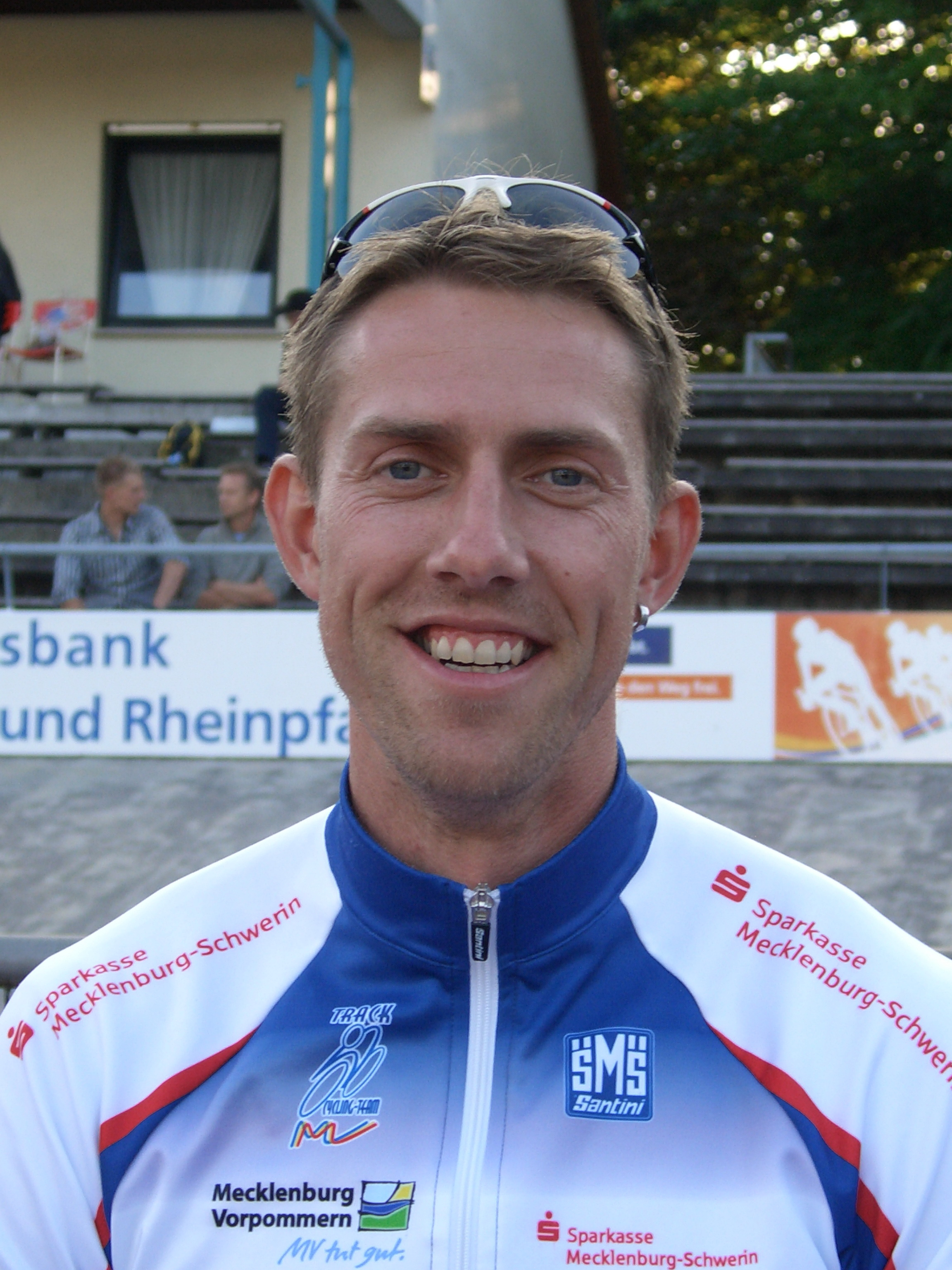

Personal information
- Full name: Stefan Nimke
- Born: 1 March 1978 (age 48) Hagenow, Bezirk Schwerin, East Germany

Cycling career
- Sport: Cycling
- Discipline: Track
- Role: Rider
Medal record
Men's track cycling
Representing Germany
Olympic Games
Gold medal – first place	2004 Athens	Team Sprint
Silver medal – second place	2000 Sydney	1 km Time Trial
Bronze medal – third place	2004 Athens	1 km Time Trial
Bronze medal – third place	2008 Beijing	Team Sprint
World Championships
Gold medal – first place	2003 Stuttgart	1 km Time Trial
Gold medal – first place	2009 Pruszków	1 km Time Trial
Gold medal – first place	2010 Ballerup	Team Sprint
Gold medal – first place	2011 Apeldoorn	1 km Time Trial
Gold medal – first place	2011 Apeldoorn	Team sprint
Gold medal – first place	2012 Melbourne	1 km Time Trial
Bronze medal – third place	1997 Perth	1 km Time Trial
Bronze medal – third place	1998 Bordeaux	Team Sprint
Bronze medal – third place	1999 Berlin	1 km Time Trial
Bronze medal – third place	1999 Berlin	Team Sprint
Bronze medal – third place	2005 Los Angeles	Team Sprint
Bronze medal – third place	2006 Bordeaux	Sprint
Bronze medal – third place	2007 Palma de Mallorca	Team Sprint
Bronze medal – third place	2009 Pruszków	Team Sprint
European Championships
Gold medal – first place	2010 Pruszków	Team Sprint
Gold medal – first place	2011 Apeldoorn	Team sprint

Stefan Nimke (born 1 March 1978 in Hagenow, Bezirk Schwerin) is an Olympic and world champion track cyclist from Germany.

At the 2000 Summer Olympics, he won the silver medal in the men's 1 km time trial, and was part of the German men's team that finished 7th in the men's team sprint.

At the 2004 Summer Olympics, he won the gold medal in the men's team sprint with Jens Fiedler and René Wolff, and won the bronze medal in the men's 1 km time trial.

At the 2008 Summer Olympics, he won the bronze medal in the men's team sprint, with Rene Enders and Maximillan Levy and finished in 9th place in the men's individual sprint.

== See also ==
- Cycling at the 2004 Summer Olympics
- Cycling at the 2000 Summer Olympics
