= Richard Louveteau Glasspool =

- Born: 8 June 1884; Eastleigh, Hampshire, United Kingdom
- Died: 1949 (aged 64–65)

Richard Louveteau Glasspool (1884-1949) was a British businessman and philanthropist, who established the Glasspool Trust in 1939.
