= Scott Mulder =

Canadian cyclist

Personal information
- Born: 22 June 1992 (age 34)

Cycling career
- Sport: Cycling
- Discipline: Track cycling
- Role: Rider
- Rider type: sprint

Scott Mulder (born 22 June 1992) is a Canadian male track cyclist, riding for the national team. He competed in the sprint, team sprint and keirin events at the 2011 UCI Track Cycling World Championships.
