= James Glasspool =

Australian cyclist (born 1991)

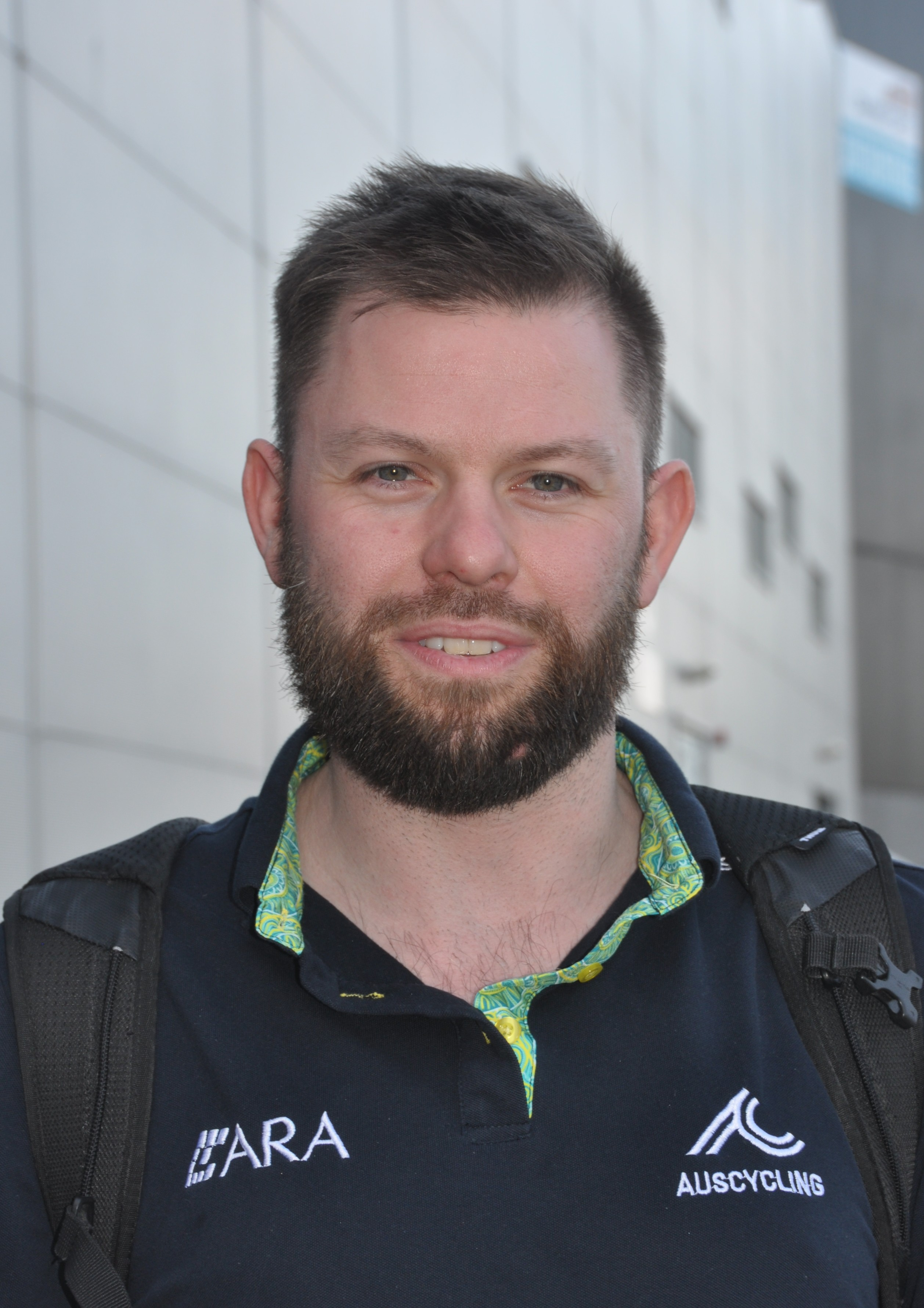
- James Glasspool (2025)

Personal information
- Full name: James Glasspool
- Born: 8 June 1991 (age 35) Adelaide, South Australia
- Height: 1.77 m (5 ft 10 in)
- Weight: 74 kg (163 lb)

Cycling career
- Sport: Cycling
- Current team: Retired
- Discipline: Road
- Role: Rider
- Rider type: Sprinter

Amateur team
- 2014: Team Novo Nordisk Development

Professional team
- 2015–2016: Team Novo Nordisk

James Glasspool (born 8 June 1991) is an Australian former professional road racing cyclist, who competed professionally for Team Novo Nordisk in 2015 and 2016. He now works as a coach for the South Australian Sports Institute (SASI).

== Biography ==
Glasspool was born, raised, and resides in Adelaide, South Australia, Australia. At the age of eleven, he was diagnosed with type 1 diabetes.

Between 2009 and 2012, Glasspool claimed five track titles. He finished ninth in the 1 km time trial at the 2012 UCI World Track Championships. In 2014, Glasspool progressed from track to road cycling; he signed with Team Novo Nordisk Development. Glasspool signed with Team Novo Nordisk, a UCI Professional Continental team, for the 2015 season.

== Major results ==
2009
1st National Junior 1 km Time Trial Championships
2nd National Junior Sprint Championships
2010
1st National Team Pursuit Championships (with Dale Parker, Jack Bobridge, and Rohan Dennis)
2nd National Junior 1 km Time Trial Championships
2nd Oceania Team Sprint Championships (with Dan Ellis and Joel Leonard)
3rd Oceania 1 km Time Trial Championships
3rd National Junior Sprint Championships
2011
1st National Team Sprint Championships (with Nathan Corrigan-Martella and Matthew Glaetzer)
2nd Oceania 1 km Time Trial Championships
2nd National 1 km Time Trial Championships
2012
1st National Team Sprint Championships (with Nathan Corrigan-Martella and Matthew Glaetzer)
1st National 1 km Time Trial Championships
2nd Oceania 1 km Time Trial Championships
3rd Oceania Team Sprint Championships (with Nathan Corrigan-Martella and Matthew Glaetzer)
9th UCI World 1 km Time Trial Championships
2013
3rd National Sprint Championships
