= Yondi Schmidt =

Dutch cyclist

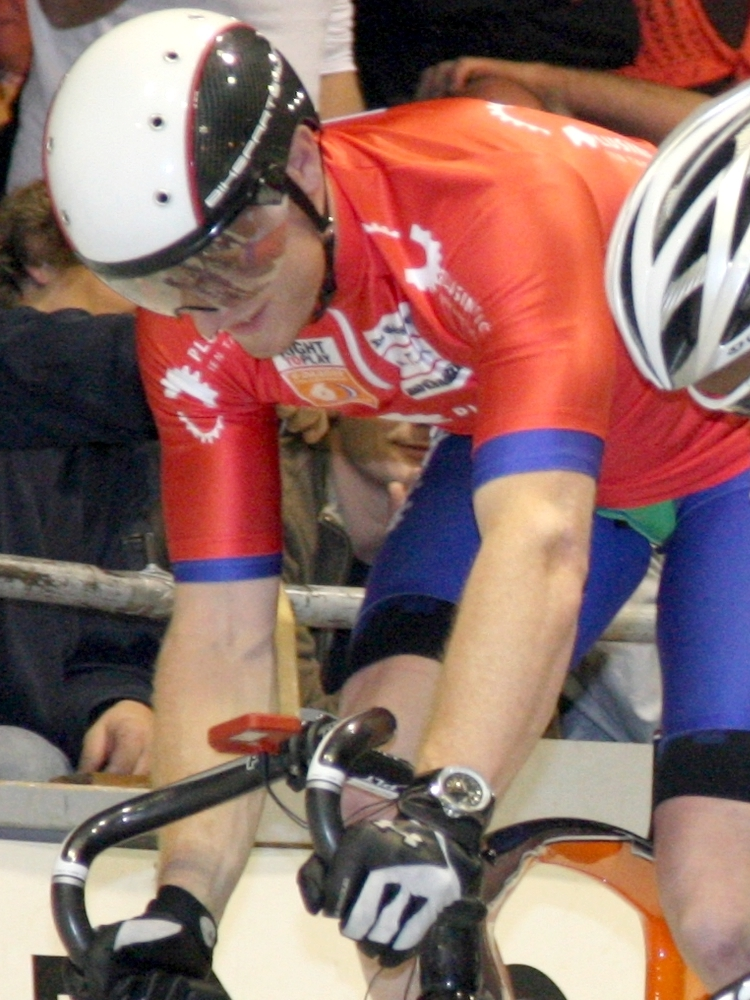
- Schmidt in 2009

Personal information
- Born: 26 April 1987 (age 39) Rotterdam, Netherlands

Cycling career
- Sport: Cycling
- Discipline: Track cycling
- Role: Rider
- Rider type: sprinter

Yondi Schmidt (born 26 April 1987) is a Dutch male track cyclist, riding for the national team. He competed in the sprint and team sprint events at the 2009 and 2010 UCI Track Cycling World Championships.
