= René Enders =

German cyclist (born 1987)

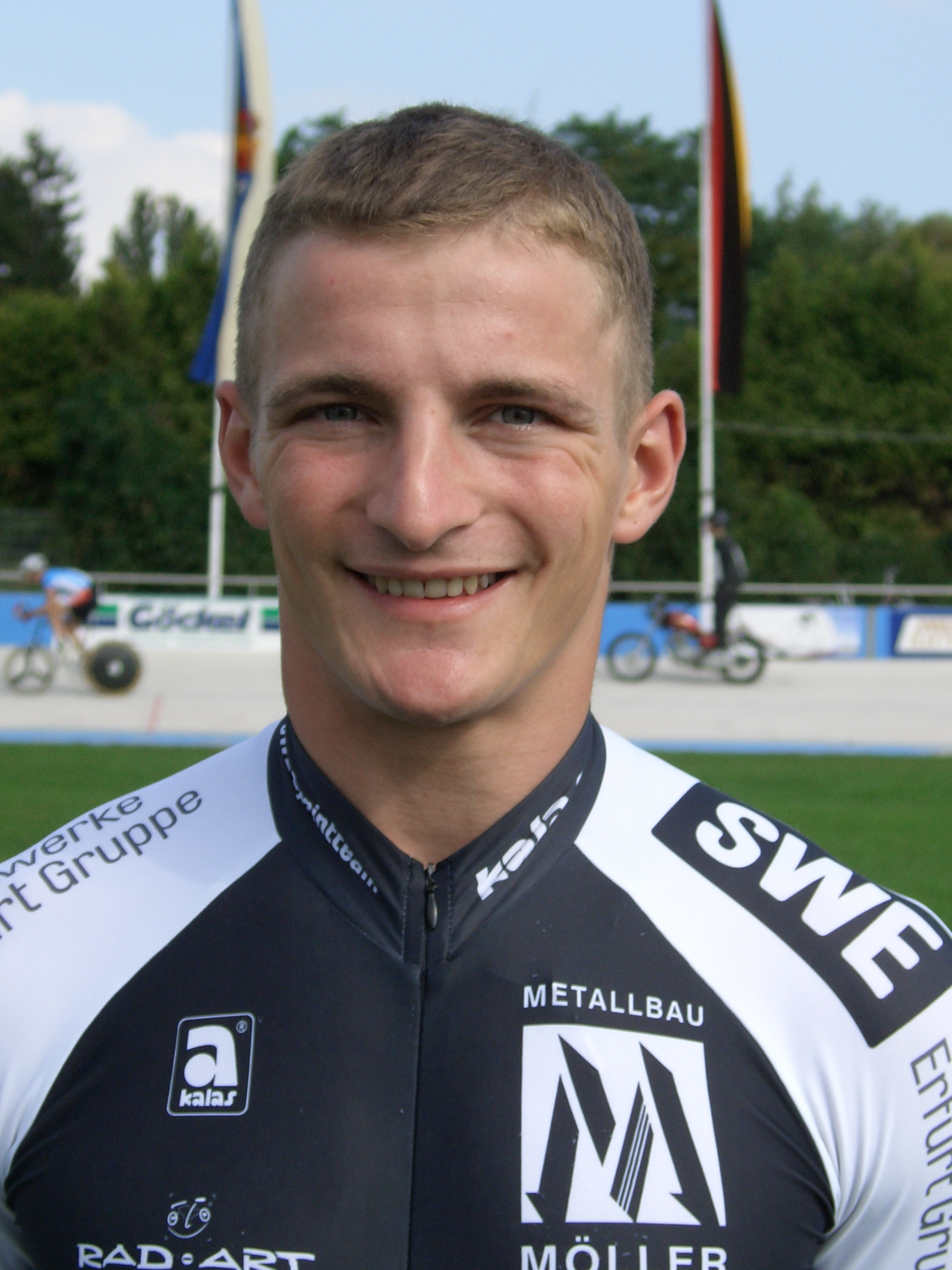

Personal information
- Born: 13 February 1987 (age 39) Zeulenroda, Bezirk Gera, East Germany
- Height: 165 cm (5 ft 5 in)
- Weight: 75 kg (165 lb)

Cycling career
- Sport: Cycling
- Discipline: Track
- Role: Rider
- Rider type: Sprinter
Medal record
Men's track cycling
Representing Germany
Olympic Games
Bronze medal – third place	2008 Beijing	Team Sprint
Bronze medal – third place	2012 London	Team Sprint
World Championships
Gold medal – first place	2011 Apeldoorn	Team sprint
Gold medal – first place	2013 Minsk	Team sprint
Silver medal – second place	2014 Cali	Team sprint
Bronze medal – third place	2015 Yvelines	Team sprint
Bronze medal – third place	2016 London	Team sprint
European Championships
Gold medal – first place	2011 Apeldoorn	Team sprint
Gold medal – first place	2013 Apeldoorn	Team sprint

René Enders (born 13 February 1987) is a German track cyclist. He won two Olympic bronze medals with the German team in the team sprint: in 2008 and in 2012. He competed for Germany at the 2016 Summer Olympics as a member of the men's sprint team. They finished in 5th place.

== See also ==
- List of European records in track cycling
