= Arfy Qhairant =

Malaysian cyclist

Personal information
- Full name: Muhd Arfy Qhairant Amran
- Born: 21 September 1993 (age 33)

Cycling career
- Sport: Cycling
- Discipline: Track cycling
- Role: Rider
- Rider type: team sprint

Muhd Arfy Qhairant Amran (born 21 September 1993) is a Malaysian male track cyclist. He competed at the 2011 and 2012 UCI Track Cycling World Championships.
