= Simon van Velthooven =

New Zealand cyclist

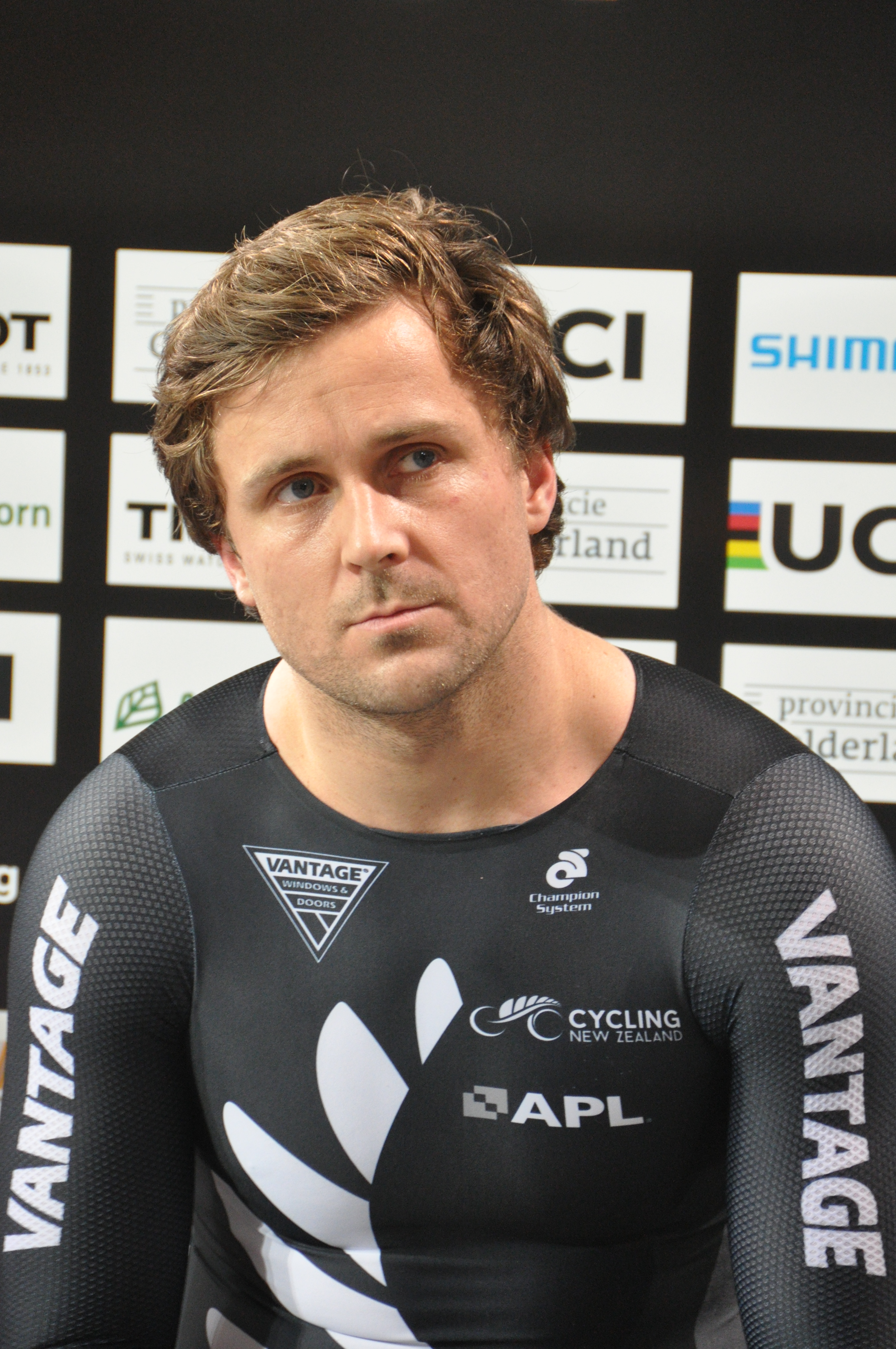
- Simon van Velthooven

Personal information
- Full name: Simon Paul van Velthooven
- Born: 8 December 1988 (age 37) Palmerston North, New Zealand
- Height: 6 ft 1 in (185 cm)
- Weight: 225 lb (102 kg)

Cycling career
- Sport: Cycling
- Current team: Team New Zealand
- Discipline: Track sprint
- Role: Rider

Major wins
- World, Commonwealth, Olympic medalist
Medal record
Representing New Zealand
Track cycling
Olympic Games
| Bronze medal – third place | 2012 London | Keirin |
World Championships
| Silver medal – second place | 2013 Minsk | 1 km Time Trial |
| Silver medal – second place | 2014 Cali | 1 km Time Trial |
| Bronze medal – third place | 2012 Melbourne | 1 km Time Trial |
Commonwealth Games
| Silver medal – second place | 2014 Glasgow | 1 km time trial |
| Bronze medal – third place | 2010 Delhi | Keirin |

Simon van Velthooven (born 8 December 1988) is a retired New Zealand track racing cyclist and three-time America's Cup winning sailor.

Simon won New Zealand's first sprint cycling medal in the men's keirin at the 2012 Summer Olympics. He has also won multiple World Championship and Commonwealth Games medals and was the 2012 World Cup champion in the 1 km time trial and keirin events In 2014, he won a silver in the 1000 m time trial at the Commonwealth Games.

Van Velthooven joined Team New Zealand in 2015 and was one of the original "cyclors" who helped develop the revolutionary boat and was a huge asset to the team that won the 2017 America's Cup for Team New Zealand, winning again in 2021 and 2024.
