= François Pervis =

French cyclist (born 1984)

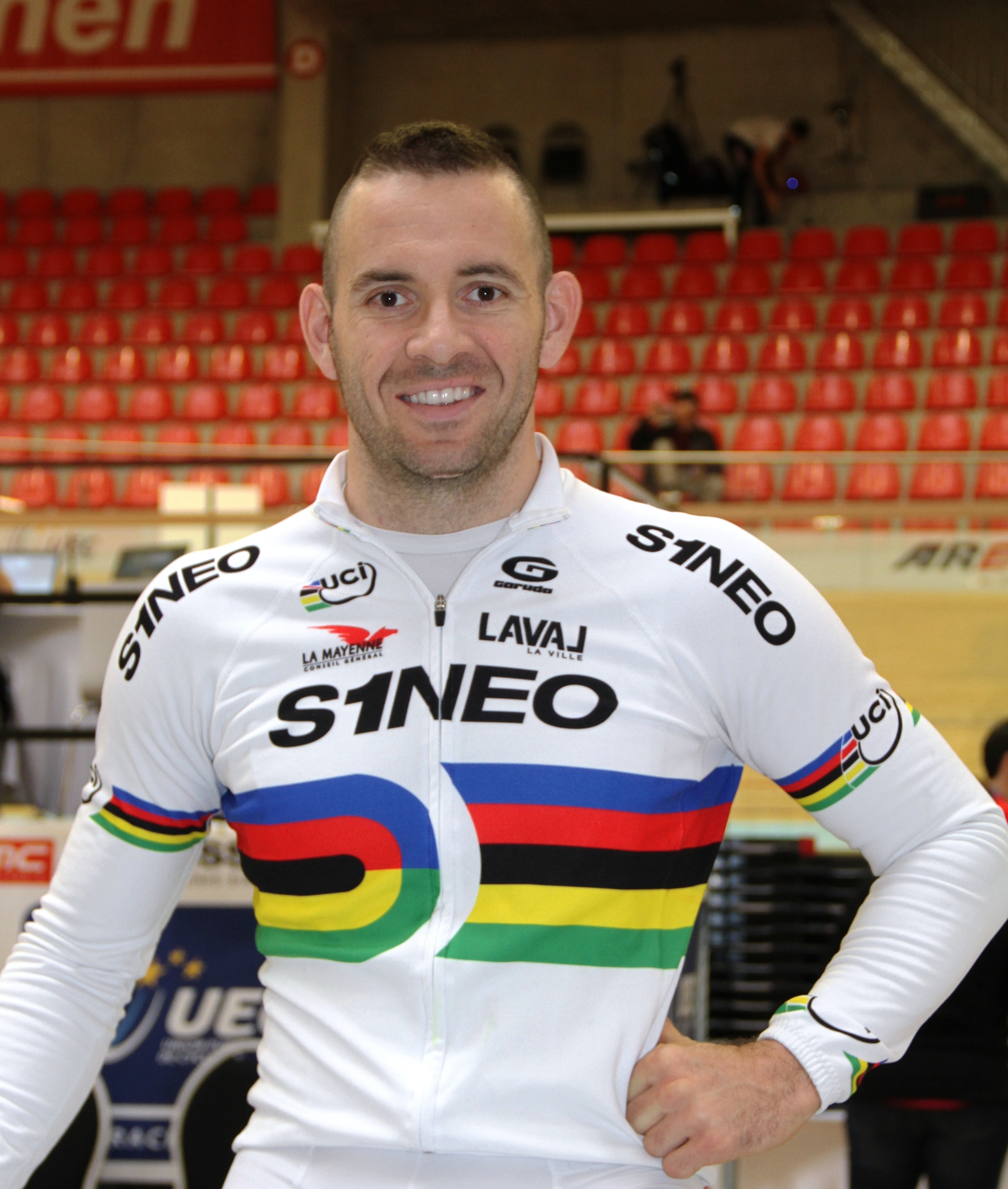
- Pervis at the 2015 European Championships

Personal information
- Born: 16 October 1984 (age 42) Château-Gontier, France
- Height: 1.82 m (6 ft 0 in)
- Weight: 86 kg (190 lb)

Cycling career
- Sport: Cycling
- Discipline: Track cycling
- Role: Rider
- Rider type: Sprinter
Medal record
Representing France
Olympic Games
Bronze medal – third place	2016 Rio de Janeiro	Team sprint
World Championships
Gold medal – first place	2013 Minsk	1 km time trial
Gold medal – first place	2014 Cali	Keirin
Gold medal – first place	2014 Cali	Sprint
Gold medal – first place	2014 Cali	1 km time trial
Gold medal – first place	2015 Yvelines	Keirin
Gold medal – first place	2015 Yvelines	1 km time trial
Gold medal – first place	2017 Hong Kong	1 km time trial
Silver medal – second place	2007 Palma de Mallorca	1 km time trial
Silver medal – second place	2009 Pruszków	Keirin
Bronze medal – third place	2006 Bordeaux	1 km time trial
Bronze medal – third place	2008 Manchester	1 km time trial
Bronze medal – third place	2010 Ballerup	1 km time trial
Bronze medal – third place	2011 Apeldoorn	1 km time trial
Bronze medal – third place	2013 Minsk	Team sprint
Bronze medal – third place	2013 Minsk	Sprint
Bronze medal – third place	2017 Hong Kong	Team sprint
Bronze medal – third place	2018 Apeldoorn	Team sprint
European Championships
Silver medal – second place	2010 Pruszków	Team sprint
Silver medal – second place	2011 Apeldoorn	Team sprint
Silver medal – second place	2013 Apeldoorn	Team sprint
Silver medal – second place	2015 Grenchen	Keirin
Silver medal – second place	2018 Glasgow	Team sprint
Bronze medal – third place	2011 Apeldoorn	Keirin
Bronze medal – third place	2013 Apeldoorn	Keirin
World Junior Track Championships
Gold medal – first place	2002 Melbourne	Team sprint
European U23 Track Championships
Gold medal – first place	2003 Moscow	Team sprint
Gold medal – first place	2004 Valencia	1 km time trial
Silver medal – second place	2006 Athens	1 km time trial
Silver medal – second place	2006 Athens	Team sprint
European Junior Track Championships
Gold medal – first place	2001 Fiorenzuola	Team sprint

François "Franck" Pervis (born 16 October 1984) is a French track cyclist. He is a former junior world champion in the team sprint and twice European under 23 champion, as well as a seven-time world champion and a holder of two world records. In 2014 he became the first track cyclist to win three individual world titles at one championship, in the keirin, 1 km and sprint.

== Biography ==
Pervis joined his first cycling club, the Véloce Club de Château Gontier, in 1996. He dabbled in road, mountain biking, cyclo-cross and track cycling as a youngster and began concentrating on the track as a junior rider.

He went on to win the silver medal as part of the team sprint squad at the 2001 Junior UCI Track World Championships. He bettered that in 2002 when he took the gold medal in the same event and added a silver in the sprint.

In 2003, he was a member of the gold medal-winning team sprint squad at the Under 23 European Track Championships, and won the U23 Sprint at the French National Track Championships, and finished second in the U23 Kilo.

Pervis competed at the 2004 Summer Olympics in Athens, finishing sixth in the Kilo. He also won the kilo at the Under 23 European Track Championships, came second in the U23 Sprint National Championships and was third in the team sprint at the World Cup in Manchester.

2005 saw Pervis take his first senior French National Championship title, winning the kilo, and coming second in the U23 sprint.

Pervis successfully defended his French National Championship title in the kilo in 2006, also winning the U23 sprint title and coming second in the team sprint. He won a handful of medals in the World Cup events in Los Angeles and Sydney as well as two silver medals in the kilo and team sprint at the Under 23 European Track Championships. He also claimed the bronze medal at the UCI Track Cycling World Championships.

He was again the senior French National Champion in 2007, beating Didier Henriette to take his third consecutive kilo title, and also taking the bronze medal in the keirin. He won the silver medal in the kilo at the 2007 UCI Track World Championships, and won several medals at the UCI Track Cycling World Cup Classics in Los Angeles, Manchester and Beijing. Pervis also finished second in the Sprint Omnium at the European Track Championships in Alkmaar

2008 brought more victories for Pervis in the World Cup events in Los Angeles and Ballerup. He took the bronze medal this time round at the UCI Track Cycling World Championships. He served as a substitute for the team sprint, representing France once again at the 2008 Summer Olympics, in Beijing, but did not ride. His teammates went on to take the silver medal.

Pervis set a new world record time in the kilometre time trial at a UCI Track Cycling World Cup event on 7 December 2013. At the Aguascalientes velodrome in Mexico he beat the previous world record by over two and a half seconds to record a time of 56.303.

== Personal life ==
He lives in Yvelines in France and in Japan. Since 2010 he spends the April–August period of every year in Japan, where he has a contract for the international keirin track racing season. After being not selected for the 2012 Olympics he went into depression, and recovered with the help of mental trainer and former football coach Denis Troch.

== Palmarès ==
2001
2nd Junior UCI Track World Championships (Team sprint)
2002
1st Junior UCI Track World Championships (Team Sprint)
3rd Junior UCI Track World Championships (Individual Sprint)
2003
1st U23 European Track Championships (Team Sprint)
1st U23 French National Track Championships (Individual Sprint)
2nd U23 French National Track Championships (Kilo)
2004
1st U23 European Track Championships (Kilo)
2nd Sprint, French National Track Championships (U23)
3rd UCI Track Cycling World Cup Classics – Manchester (Team Sprint)
2005
1st French National Track Championships (Kilo)
1st UCI Track Cycling World Cup Classics – Sydney (Team sprint)
2nd U23 French National Track Championships (Individual Sprint)
3rd UCI Track Cycling World Cup Classics – Sydney (Kilo)
2006
1st French National Track Championships (Kilo)
1st U23 French National Track Championships (Individual Sprint)
1st UCI Track Cycling World Cup Classics – Los Angeles (Team sprint)
2nd UCI Track Cycling World Cup Classics – Sydney (Kilo)
2nd UCI Track Cycling World Cup Classics – Sydney (Team sprint)
2nd U23 European Track Championships (Kilo)
2nd U23 European Track Championships (Team sprint)
2nd French National Track Championships (Team sprint)
3rd UCI Track Cycling World Championships (Kilo)
3rd UCI Track Cycling World Cup Classics – Los Angeles (Kilo)
2007
1st French National Track Championships (Kilo)
1st UCI Track Cycling World Cup Classics – Los Angeles (Kilo)
1st UCI Track Cycling World Cup Classics – Beijing (Kilo)
2nd UCI Track Cycling World Championships (Kilo)
2nd UCI Track Cycling World Cup Classics – Los Angeles (Team Sprint)
2nd UCI Track Cycling World Cup Classics – Manchester (Kilo)
2nd UCI Track Cycling World Cup Classics – Beijing (Team Sprint)
2nd European Track Championships (Individual Sprint)
3rd French National Track Championships (Keirin)
2008
1st UCI Track Cycling World Cup Classics – Ballerup (Team Sprint with Grégory Baugé & Kévin Sireau)
1st UCI Track Cycling World Cup Classics – Ballerup (Kilo)
2nd UCI Track Cycling World Cup Classics – Los Angeles (Team Sprint)
3rd UCI Track Cycling World Championships (Kilo)
2009
1st French National Track Championships (Kilo)
2013
1st UCI Track Cycling World Ranking (Kilo)
1st UCI Track Cycling World Championships (Kilo)
2nd European Track Championships (Team Sprint with Grégory Baugé and Michaël D'Almeida)
3rd UCI Track Cycling World Championships (Individual Sprint)
3rd UCI Track Cycling World Championships (Team Sprint with Julien Palma and Michaël D'Almeida)
3rd European Track Championships (Keirin)
2014
1st UCI Track Cycling World Championships (Keirin)
1st UCI Track Cycling World Championships (Individual Sprint)
1st UCI Track Cycling World Championships (Kilo)
1st French National Track Championships (Kilo)
1st French National Track Championships (Keirin)
2015
1st UCI Track Cycling World Championships (Keirin)
1st UCI Track Cycling World Championships (Kilo)
1st UCI Track Cycling World Cup Classics – Cali (Team Sprint with Grégory Baugé & Quentin Lafargue)
1st Anadia (Individual Sprint)

Records
Preceded by Arnaud Tournant	Men's 1KM Time Trial world record holder December 2013 –	Succeeded by
Preceded by Kevin Sireau	Men's 200m Time Trial world record holder December 2013 –	Succeeded by
