= Teun Mulder =

Dutch cyclist (born 1981)

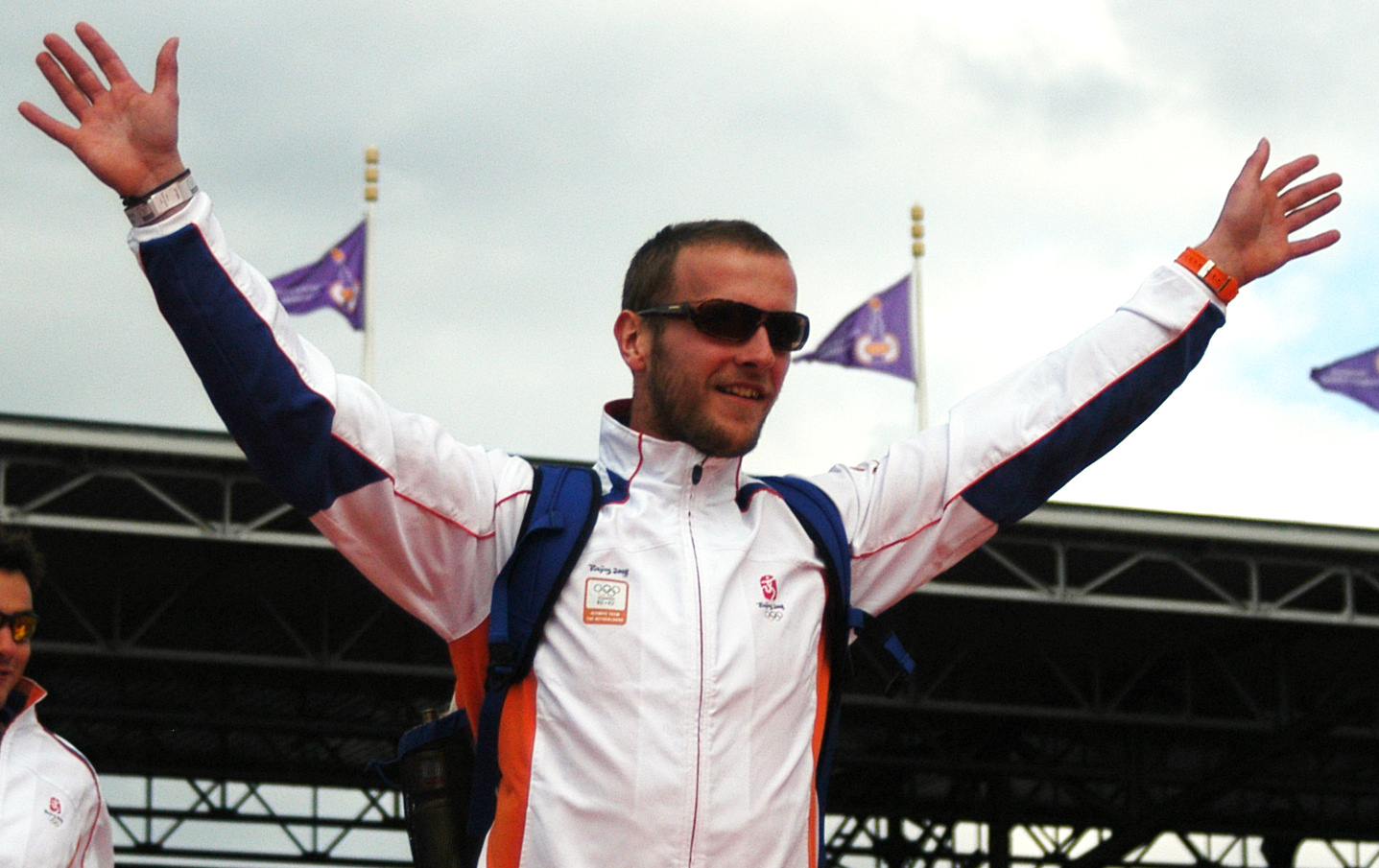

Personal information
- Full name: Teunis Mulder
- Nickname: "Teun"
- Born: 18 June 1981 (age 45) Zuuk, the Netherlands

Cycling career
- Sport: Cycling
- Discipline: Track
- Role: Rider
Medal record
Representing Netherlands
Men's track cycling
Summer Olympics
Bronze medal – third place	2012 London	Keirin
World Championships
Gold medal – first place	2005 Los Angeles	Keirin
Gold medal – first place	2008 Manchester	1 km time trial
Gold medal – first place	2010 Ballerup	1 km time trial
Silver medal – second place	2005 Los Angeles	Team sprint
Silver medal – second place	2008 Manchester	Keirin
Silver medal – second place	2011 Apeldoorn	1 km time trial
Bronze medal – third place	2008 Manchester	Team sprint
Bronze medal – third place	2009 Pruszków	Keirin
Bronze medal – third place	2011 Apeldoorn	Keirin
Para-cycling Track World Championships
Silver medal – second place	2016 Montichiari	Tandem B 1 km
Silver medal – second place	2016 Montichiari	Tandem B sprint

Teunis ("Teun") Mulder (born 18 June 1981) is a Dutch track cyclist. He is a former keirin World Champion and won a silver in the team sprint with Theo Bos and Tim Veldt. Mulder also won four world cup classics in the team sprint and keirin. He competed for his native country at the 2004 Summer Olympics in Athens, Greece, finishing 10th at the individual sprint, 6th at the team sprint (with Theo Bos and Jan Bos) and 11th at the 1 km time trial, while he was eliminated in the first repechage round of the keirin competition. At the 2012 Summer Olympics, he won the bronze medal in the men's keirin.

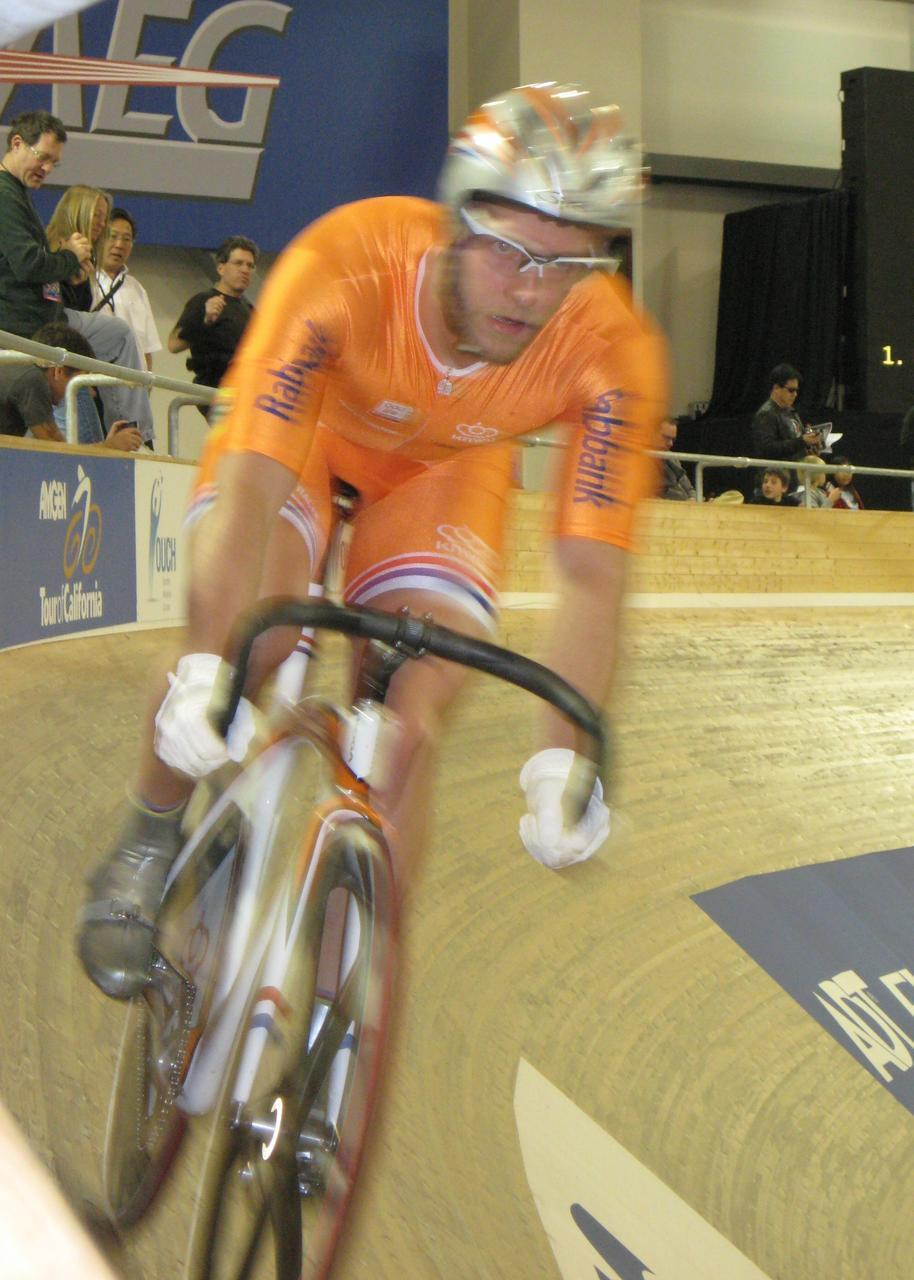
World Cup, Los Angeles, 2008

Mulder was appointed as a member of the inaugural UCI Athletes' Commission in 2011.

== Career highlights ==
2000
2nd, Dutch National Track Championships, 1 km, Elite, The Netherlands (NED)
2001
3rd, European Championship, Track, Keirin, U23, Fiorenzuola (ITA)
1st, Dutch National Track Championships, 1 km, Elite, The Netherlands (NED)
1st, National Championship, Track, Sprint, Elite, The Netherlands (NED)
3rd, European Championship, Track, 1 km, U23, Brno (CZE)
2002
3rd, European Championship, Track, 1 km, U23
3rd, European Championship, Track, Sprint, U23
1st, Dutch National Track Championships, 1 km, Elite, The Netherlands (NED)
2nd, National Championship, Track, Keirin, Elite, The Netherlands (NED)
2nd, National Championship, Track, Sprint, Elite, The Netherlands (NED)
2003
1st, European Championship, Track, Keirin, U23
2004
1st, World Cup, Track, Team Sprint, Manchester (GBR)
1st, Athens Open Balkan Championship, Track, Team Sprint, Elite/U23, Greece, Athens (GRE)
1st, Dutch National Track Championships, 1 km, Elite, The Netherlands, Alkmaar (NED)
2nd, National Championship, Track, Keirin, Elite, The Netherlands, Alkmaar (NED)
2nd, National Championship, Track, Sprint, Elite, The Netherlands, Alkmaar (NED)
2005
3rd, World Cup, Track, Sprint, Moscow (RUS)
1st, World Cup, Track, Keirin, Los Angeles (USA)
1st, World Cup, Track, Team Sprint, Los Angeles (USA)
2nd, World Championship, Track, Team Sprint, Elite, Los Angeles (USA)
1st, World Championship, Track, Keirin, Elite, Los Angeles (USA)
2nd, European Championship, Track, Omnium, Sprint, Fiorenzuola (ITA)
2nd, World Cup, Track, Sprint, Manchester (GBR)
2nd, World Cup, Track, Team Sprint, Manchester (GBR)
2nd, Dutch National Track Championships, 1 km, Elite, The Netherlands, Amsterdam (NED)
1st, National Championship, Track, Sprint, Elite, The Netherlands, Amsterdam (NED)
2006
2nd, World Cup, Track, Keirin, Los Angeles (USA)
1st, World Cup, Track, Team Sprint (1), Sydney (AUS)
3rd, World Cup, Track, Sprint, Sydney (AUS)
2nd, World Cup, Track, Team Sprint (2), Sydney (AUS)
2nd, World Cup, Track, Keirin, Moscow (RUS)
2nd, World Cup, Track, Team Sprint, Moscow (RUS)
2nd, Dutch National Track Championships, Sprint, Alkmaar (NED)
2nd, Dutch National Track Championships, Keirin, Alkmaar (NED)
2007
3rd, Rotterdam Sprint Cup, Rotterdam (NED)
2nd, World Cup, Track, Keirin, Manchester (GBR)
1st, European Championship, Track, Omnium, Sprint, Alkmaar (NED)
1st, World Cup, Track, Team Sprint, Beijing (CHN)
3rd, World Cup, Track, Keirin, Beijing (CHN)
2nd, Dutch National Track Championships, Sprint, Alkmaar (NED)
2nd, Dutch National Track Championships, Keirin, Alkmaar (NED)
2008
3rd, World Cup, Track, Sprint, Los Angeles (USA)
1st, World Championship, Track, 1 KM, Manchester (GBR)
1st, Dutch National Track Championships, Sprint, Apeldoorn (NED)
1st, Dutch National Track Championships, 1 km time trial, Apeldoorn (NED)
2nd, Dutch National Track Championships, Keirin, Alkmaar (NED)
2009
1st, Dutch National Track Championships, Sprint, Alkmaar (NED)
1st, Dutch National Track Championships, 1 km time trial, Alkmaar (NED)
1st, Dutch National Track Championships, Keirin, Alkmaar (NED)
2010
1st, World Championship, Track, 1 KM, Ballerup (DEN)
2011
2nd, World Championship, Track, 1 km time trial, Apeldoorn (NED)
3rd, World Championship, Track, Keirin, Apeldoorn (NED)
1st, Dutch National Track Championships, Sprint, Apeldoorn (NED)
1st, Dutch National Track Championships, 1 km time trial, Apeldoorn (NED)
2012
3rd 2012 Summer Olympics, Keirin, London (GB)

== See also ==
- List of Dutch Olympic cyclists
