= 2011 UCI Track Cycling World Championships =

Track cycling world championships

- Venue: Apeldoorn, Netherlands
- Date: 23–27 March 2011
- Velodrome: Omnisport Apeldoorn
- Events: 19

The 2011 UCI Track Cycling World Championships was the World Championships for track cycling in 2011. The championships took place at the Omnisport Apeldoorn in Apeldoorn, Netherlands from 23 to 27 March 2011. In January 2012 it was announced that Grégory Baugé's results in the Sprint and Team Sprint competitions would be nullified.

The championships were dominated by the rivalry between Australia and Great Britain, who shared 10 of the 19 gold medals available between them, including in eight of the ten Olympic events.

== Participating nations ==
41 nations participated.

- Argentina (2)
- Australia (19)
- Austria (3)
- Belgium (11)
- Belarus (4)
- Canada (9)
- Chile (6)
- China (11)
- Colombia (12)
- Cuba (3)
- Czech Republic (9)
- Denmark (5)
- Spain (14)
- France (17)
- Great Britain (16)
- Germany (23)
- Greece (9)
- Hong Kong (8)
- Ireland (2)
- Italy (11)
- Japan (9)
- Kazakhstan (1)
- South Korea (3)
- Lithuania (7)
- Malaysia (5)
- Mexico (2)
- Netherlands (21)
- New Zealand (16)
- Poland (10)
- South Africa (1)
- Russia (21)
- Slovenia (1)
- Switzerland (8)
- Slovakia (1)
- Thailand (3)
- Chinese Taipei (1)
- Trinidad and Tobago
- Ukraine (10)
- United States (9)
- Uzbekistan (2)
- Venezuela (5)

== Medal summary ==
Event	Gold		Silver		Bronze	
Men's events
Men's sprint (Note: France's Grégory Baugé originally won the gold medal, but was stripped of that title in January 2012, with the other riders in the final round promoted to the respective medal positions.)	Jason Kenny; Great Britain		Chris Hoy; Great Britain		Mickaël Bourgain; France	
Men's 1 km time trial	Stefan Nimke; Germany	1:00.793	Teun Mulder; Netherlands	1:01:179	François Pervis; France	1:01.228
Men's individual pursuit	Jack Bobridge; Australia	4:21.141	Jesse Sergent; New Zealand	4:23.865	Michael Hepburn; Australia	4:22.553
Men's team pursuit	Jack Bobridge; Rohan Dennis; Luke Durbridge; Michael Hepburn; Australia	3:57.832	Alexei Markov; Evgeny Kovalev; Ivan Kovalev; Alexander Serov; Russia	4:02.229	Ed Clancy; Steven Burke; Peter Kennaugh; Andy Tennant; Great Britain	4:02.781
Men's team sprint (Note: France's Grégory Baugé, Michaël D'Almeida and Kévin Sireau originally won the gold medal, but were stripped of that title in January 2012, with the other teams in the final round promoted to the respective medal positions.)	René Enders; Maximilian Levy; Stefan Nimke; Germany	44.483	Matthew Crampton; Chris Hoy; Jason Kenny; Great Britain	44.235	Dan Ellis; Matthew Glaetzer; Jason Niblett; Australia	45.241
Men's keirin	Shane Perkins; Australia		Chris Hoy; Great Britain		Teun Mulder; Netherlands	
Men's scratch	Kwok Ho Ting; Hong Kong		Elia Viviani; Italy		Morgan Kneisky; France	
Men's points race	Edwin Ávila; Colombia		Cameron Meyer; Australia		Morgan Kneisky; France	
Men's madison	Leigh Howard; Cameron Meyer; Australia		Martin Bláha; Jiří Hochmann; Czech Republic		Theo Bos; Peter Schep; Netherlands	
Men's omnium	Michael Freiberg; Australia		Shane Archbold; New Zealand		Gijs van Hoecke; Belgium	
Women's events
Women's sprint	Anna Meares; Australia		Simona Krupeckaitė; Lithuania		Victoria Pendleton; Great Britain	
Women's 500 m time trial	Olga Panarina; Belarus	33.896	Sandie Clair; France	33.919	Miriam Welte; Germany	34.496
Women's individual pursuit	Sarah Hammer; United States	3.32.933	Alison Shanks; New Zealand	3:33.229	Vilija Sereikaitė; Lithuania	3.37.643
Women's team pursuit	Laura Trott; Wendy Houvenaghel; Dani King; Great Britain	3:23.419	Sarah Hammer; Dotsie Bausch; Jennie Reed; United States	3:25.308	Kaytee Boyd; Jaime Nielsen; Alison Shanks; New Zealand	3:24.065
Women's team sprint	Kaarle McCulloch; Anna Meares; Australia	33.237	Victoria Pendleton; Jessica Varnish; Great Britain	33.525	Gong Jinjie; Guo Shuang; Junhong Lin; China	33.586
Women's keirin	Anna Meares; Australia		Olga Panarina; Belarus		Clara Sanchez; France	
Women's scratch	Marianne Vos; Netherlands		Katherine Bates; Australia		Dani King; Great Britain	
Women's points race	Tatsiana Sharakova; Belarus		Jarmila Machačová; Czech Republic		Giorgia Bronzini; Italy	
Women's omnium	Tara Whitten; Canada		Sarah Hammer; United States		Kirsten Wild; Netherlands	

== Medal table ==
Rank	Nation	Gold	Silver	Bronze	Total
1	Australia	8	2	2	12
2	Great Britain	2	4	3	9
3	Belarus	2	1	0	3
4	Germany	2	0	1	3
5	United States	1	2	0	3
6	Netherlands	1	1	3	5
7	Canada	1	0	0	1
7	Colombia	1	0	0	1
7	Hong Kong	1	0	0	1
10	New Zealand	0	3	1	4
11	Czech Republic	0	2	0	2
12	France	0	1	5	6
13	Italy	0	1	1	2
13	Lithuania	0	1	1	2
15	Russia	0	1	0	1
16	Belgium	0	0	1	1
16	China	0	0	1	1
Totals (17 entries)		19	19	19	57

- France were stripped of two gold medals in January 2012, following the suspension of Grégory Baugé for doping test availability violations, and the medals in those two events were redistributed by UCI.

== See also ==
- 2010–11 UCI Track Cycling World Ranking
- 2010–11 UCI Track Cycling World Cup Classics
