= 2011 Cricket World Cup final =

Cricket final

2011 Cricket World Cup Final
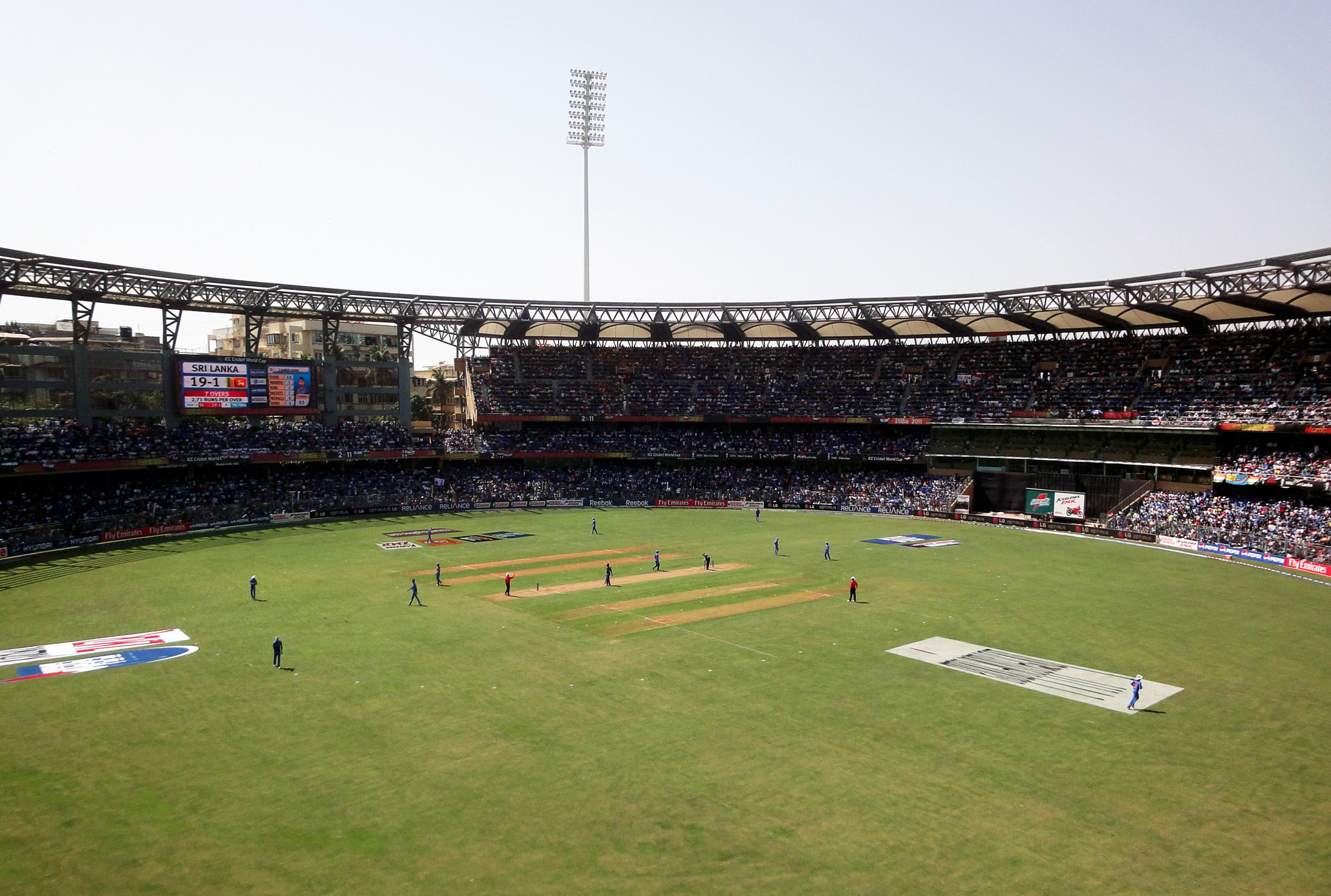
- The Wankhede during the final
- Event: 2011 Cricket World Cup
Sri Lanka	India
(Sri Lanka)	(India)
274/6	277/4
50 overs	48.2 overs
- India won by 6 wickets
- Date: 2 April 2011
- Venue: Wankhede Stadium, Mumbai
- Player of the match: MS Dhoni (Ind)
- Umpires: Aleem Dar (Pak) and Simon Taufel (Aus)
- Attendance: 33,000

The final of the 2011 Cricket World Cup was played between India and Sri Lanka at the Wankhede Stadium, Mumbai on Saturday 2 April 2011. India won the match by six wickets to win their second World Cup title after the 1983 tournament and became the third team to have won the title more than once, after Australia (1987, 1999, 2003, 2007) and the West Indies (1975 and 1979). India became the first country to win Cricket World Cup in their own country.

Both teams had progressed through three stages to reach the final. India had won all but two matches to that point, losing to South Africa and tying with England in the group stage. Sri Lanka had won all but two matches to that point, losing to Pakistan and a no result against Australia in the group stage. Sri Lankan captain Kumar Sangakkara chose to bat first after winning the toss. The team scored slowly until the 17th over when they lost both their openers. Sangakkara added 62 runs with Mahela Jayawardene before being dismissed for 48 runs. Although wickets kept falling at one end, Jayawardene scored 103 runs in 88 balls; he was involved in a partnership of 66 runs with Thisara Perera. The pair took Sri Lanka's total to 274 runs at the close of the innings.

In reply, India lost their opener Virender Sehwag to the second ball of the innings, out LBW by Lasith Malinga. Sachin Tendulkar, too, got out quickly. The next set of batsmen, Gautam Gambhir and Virat Kohli, added 83 runs in 15 overs before the latter got out in the 22nd over. India captain MS Dhoni, promoting himself up the order, joined Gambhir and they both added 109 runs, an Indian record in a World Cup final. Gambhir got out for 97 runs in the 42nd over. India chased down the total and won the match by six wickets in the 49th over. Dhoni was declared the "man of the match" for scoring 91 runs, while his compatriot Yuvraj Singh was awarded the "man of the tournament".

The match was watched by about 33,000 spectators at the venue and about 135 million viewers on television in India. The President of Sri Lanka Mahinda Rajapaksa, a known cricket enthusiast, announced he would attend the match along with his sons. Following this, the Indian President Pratibha Patil also announced her decision to attend the match.

The match was the tenth World Cup final and the second final to be hosted by India, after the 1987 final held at Eden Gardens, Kolkata. It was the first time that two Asian teams had faced each other in an ODI World Cup final. The 2011 final was the first to feature two teams from the same continent, and the first time that two co-hosts contested the final. This was the second time in World Cup history that a host nation won the final and the first time to win on their home ground.

India made their third appearance in a World Cup final. Previously, they won the final in 1983, and lost in 2003. Sri Lanka appeared in their third World Cup final; breakthrough winners against Australia in 1996 they finished as runners up (also to Australia) in the previous World Cup in 2007. Prior to this match, India and Sri Lanka had met each other seven times in World Cup history with Sri Lanka ahead with four wins and two defeats and one game ending in a no-result. In One Day Internationals, India led Sri Lanka with 75 victories against 52 victories for Sri Lanka, while 11 matches had ended with no result.

== Road to the final ==
=== Sri Lanka ===
Sri Lanka qualified for the knockouts with a second-place finish in Group A. They won four of their six games, suffered a defeat against Pakistan and the match against Australia was washed out. Being level on points with Australia, they were placed second in the group due to their better net run rate.

Sri Lanka had clinically demolished England in the quarter final, defeating them by 10 wickets. Both the Sri Lankan openers, Tillakaratne Dilshan and Warushavithana Upul Tharanga made unbeaten centuries and put up a world-record stand for the first wicket in a World Cup. The New Zealand semi-final was more keenly contested, but was still won with relative ease by Sri Lanka, and hence they entered their second consecutive World Cup final after 2007. The matches showcased the effective unconventional bowling of pace spearhead Lasith Malinga, restrictive fielding, and the batting prowess of the Sri Lankan top order.

=== India ===
India were drawn in Group B where they finished second behind South Africa. They managed wins in four of their six games, lost one against South Africa while their game against England was a high scoring tie.

Both of India's knockout matches were high-pressure contests. Australia was a strong team and the defending champions, and India had to give a very good performance to restrict Australia to 260 and then successfully chase down the target even as wickets fell regularly. India and their semi-final opponents, Pakistan, were historical rivals, and there was immense public pressure on both teams with the match attended by the Prime Ministers of both countries. India batted first and ultimately defeated Pakistan by 29 runs.

== Team composition ==
India largely retained the same team it had in the semi-final against Pakistan, with just one change. Ashish Nehra, left-arm medium pacer, had suffered a finger fracture while fielding in that match, and he was replaced by another pacer, Sreesanth. India was widely rated as having the strongest batting line-up in the tournament, and chose to back this strength throughout the campaign by playing seven batsmen and four bowlers. Due to Yuvraj Singh performing well with both bat and ball in the tournament, India could afford to play with only four specialist bowlers. Yuvraj bowled his full quota of 10 overs in many matches, including the semi-final against Pakistan. Among the four bowling slots, Zaheer Khan was the pace spearhead supported in most matches by Munaf Patel, while Harbhajan Singh was the regular off-spinner. The fourth slot was taken by different bowlers in different matches, including Sreesanth, Nehra, leg-spinner Piyush Chawla, or off-spinner Ravichandran Ashwin. The captain had chosen Nehra over Ashwin in the match against Pakistan also. Indian captain Mahendra Singh Dhoni had then said he preferred having three seamers because it gave him more options. He already had proven spinners in Harbhajan and Yuvraj, and could call upon many other Indian players who can bowl part-time spin (including Sachin Tendulkar, Suresh Raina, and Virender Sehwag).

Sri Lanka made four changes to their side from the semi-final. All-rounder Angelo Mathews had suffered a torn quadriceps and could not play. Sri Lanka knew the Indians' strength was batting, and thus they needed to take wickets to put them under pressure. This led to their choosing a full complement of bowlers. Spin bowler Ajantha Mendis had performed well throughout the tournament, but he had a poor record against India in pre-World Cup clashes and was not chosen for the final. Spinner Rangana Herath was also dropped. Off-spinner Suraj Randiv and batsman Chamara Kapugedera were flown in from Sri Lanka to strengthen the side. Seamers Nuwan Kulasekara and Thisara Perera, who had played matches in the earlier group stage, were drafted into the team. Legendary spinner Muttiah Muralitharan was carrying minor injuries, but was retained. He had announced that he would retire from One Day International cricket after the World Cup, so this was his last match. The semi-final held at the Premadasa Stadium in Colombo was his last ODI match on home soil, and there he had been carried around the stadium, perched on his teammates' shoulders, on a lap of honour after that match.

== Match details ==
=== Match officials ===
The on-field umpires were Simon Taufel of Australia and Aleem Dar of Pakistan, with Ian Gould being the third (TV) umpire. All of these umpires were highly rated; Taufel had previously won 5 ICC Umpire of the Year awards, while Dar had won two. Taufel had never been able to officiate in a World Cup final because Australia had been qualifying for the finals in the last four editions. Jeff Crowe was the match referee and Steve Davis the reserve umpire.

- On-field umpires: Aleem Dar (Pak) and Simon Taufel (Aus)
- TV umpire: Ian Gould (Eng)
- Reserve umpire: Steve Davis (Aus)
- Match referee: Jeff Crowe (NZ)

=== Toss ===
A controversy developed when Kumar Sangakkara called the toss. The toss came up as heads, but the match referee Jeff Crowe did not hear the call over the crowd. It was decided that there would be a re-toss. Sangakkara called heads as the coin was spun the second time. He won the re-toss and decided to bat.

=== Sri Lankan innings ===
Sri Lanka started the innings slowly, constrained by good bowling from Zaheer Khan and committed fielding from Yuvraj Singh, Suresh Raina, and Virat Kohli inside the 30-yard circle. Zaheer began with three consecutive maidens and the wicket of Upul Tharanga, conceding only six runs in his five-over spell. Sri Lankan opener Tillakaratne Dilshan was bowled by Harbhajan Singh when a delivery carried on to the stumps after deflecting off his gloves. Captain Kumar Sangakkara came in after Tharanga's dismissal, and was building a solid foundation with Dilshan before the latter was dismissed. Mahela Jayawardene came to the crease when Sri Lanka were 60/2 in the 17th over. Sangakkara and Mahela went about the task of consolidating the innings, but eventually Sangakkara was caught behind by Dhoni at 48. New batsman Thilan Samaraweera was adjudged not out by the umpire when a ball hit his thigh pad off the bowling of Yuvraj Singh. The Indians decided to review the decision and he was ultimately given out. Chamara Kapugedera, who was playing his first World Cup match, was caught off a deceptive slower ball by Zaheer Khan. Jayawardene, meanwhile, continued with his quality batting, ultimately scoring 103 not out from 88 balls in a high-class batting display. Helped by the hard-hitting of Nuwan Kulasekara and Thisara Perera, Sri Lanka scored 91 runs in the last 10 overs, including 63 in the batting powerplay (45–50 overs) to take the score to 274/6.

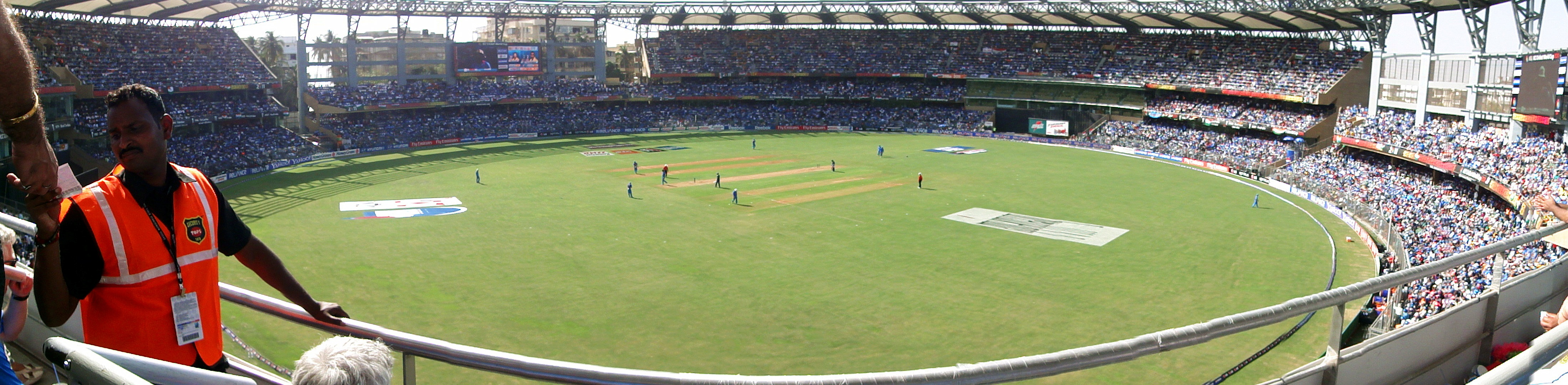
Wankhede Stadium during the final.

=== Indian innings ===
"Dhoni finishes off in style! A magnificent strike into the crowd; India lift the World Cup after 28 years, and the party starts in the dressing room, and it's an Indian captain who has been absolutely magnificent in the night of the final."

— Ravi Shastri, former World Cup winner and commentator on India's win, 02 April, 2011. This quote is one of the most iconic comments in cricket history.

India had a wobbly start, with Virender Sehwag and Sachin Tendulkar both dismissed early by Lasith Malinga, leaving them struggling at 31 for two. Sehwag was trapped LBW for a duck on the second ball of the innings. Tendulkar started with some good strokes, racing to 18 off 14 balls, but then edged a catch to wicketkeeper Sangakkara. Virat Kohli and Gautam Gambhir started the recovery with some fluent stroke play and quick running between wickets, taking India to 114 before Kohli was caught-and-bowled by Tillakaratne Dilshan for 35. When he was on 30, Gambhir mistimed a shot off the bowling of Suraj Randiv, sending the ball high up in the air, but Nuwan Kulasekara could not hold on to a difficult chance at long off. Kohli and Gambhir put together an 83-run partnership before Kohli's dismissal. Dhoni came in after Kohli to bat at number five, usually the position of Yuvraj Singh. Both Kohli and Dhoni are right-handed batsmen, while Gambhir and Yuvraj are left-handed. Along with other considerations, by coming ahead of Yuvraj, Dhoni ensured there would be a right-left batting combination between him and Gambhir, which makes it difficult for the bowlers to get into a rhythm, and necessitates frequent field changes. Later many legends considered it as one of his many masterstrokes which he has taken in every final of ICC tournament (which he won) to clinch India to a victory. Both Gambhir and Dhoni emphasised on preserving the wickets, and later accelerating with a greater flow of boundaries. Gambhir and Dhoni added 109 for the fourth wicket with Gambhir scoring 97. Gambhir tried to bring up his century with a boundary, but his heaving bat failed to connect with the ball, and he was bowled by Thisara Perera. Following Gambhir's dismissal, 52 runs were required off 52 balls. Yuvraj Singh was the new batsman and along with Dhoni took India to victory, and Dhoni sealed the match hitting a six off Nuwan Kulasekara, when only 4 runs were required off 11 balls. Dhoni finished on 91 not out from 79 deliveries. Like in many other day-night matches in the subcontinent, dew started to form on the outfield grass in the night, making the ball damp and difficult to grip especially in the later part of India's batting. However, this was a known factor and was taken into consideration by the Sri Lankan captain when he chose to bat first after winning the toss. By crossing the target of 274, India had set a record for the highest successful run-chase in a World Cup final.

At the end of the match, the batting strength of both the teams stood out. The three top run scorers of this tournament were from these finalists: Tillekaratne Dilshan (500 runs), Sachin Tendulkar (482), and Kumar Sangakkara (465). In the top 10 tournament scorers, there were 3 from Sri Lanka (Upul Tharanga (395) in addition to the previous two), and 4 from India (Gautam Gambhir (393), Virender Sehwag (380), and Yuvraj Singh (362) in addition to Sachin Tendulkar).

2 April
14:30 (D/N)
Scorecard

Sri Lanka; 274/6 (50 overs)	v	India; 277/4 (48.2 overs)
Mahela Jayawardene 103* (88); Yuvraj Singh 2/49 (10 overs)		Gautam Gambhir 97 (122); Lasith Malinga 2/42 (9 overs)

India won by 6 wickets
Wankhede Stadium, Mumbai
Umpires: Simon Taufel (Aus) and Aleem Dar (Pak)
Player of the match: MS Dhoni (Ind)

- Sri Lanka won the toss and elected to bat.
- Sreesanth (Ind), Muttiah Muralitharan and Thilan Samaraweera (SL) played in their last ODI.

=== Scorecard ===
1st innings

Sri Lankan Batting
Player	Status	Runs	Balls	4s	6s	Strike rate
Upul Tharanga	c Sehwag b Khan	2	20	0	0	10.00
Tillakaratne Dilshan	b Harbhajan	33	49	3	0	67.34
Kumar Sangakkara	c †Dhoni b Yuvraj	48	67	5	0	71.64
Mahela Jayawardene	not out	103	88	13	0	117.04
Thilan Samaraweera	lbw b Yuvraj	21	34	2	0	61.76
Chamara Kapugedera	c Raina b Khan	1	5	0	0	20.00
Nuwan Kulasekara	run out (†Dhoni)	32	30	1	1	106.66
Thisara Perera	not out	22	9	3	1	244.44
Lasith Malinga	did not bat					
Suraj Randiv	did not bat					
Muttiah Muralitharan	did not bat					
Extras	(b 1, lb 3, w 6, nb 2)	12				
Total	(6 wickets; 50 overs)	274		27	2	

Fall of wickets: 1/17 (Tharanga, 6.1 ov), 2/60 (Dilshan, 16.5 ov), 3/122 (Sangakkara, 27.5 ov), 4/179 (Samaraweera, 38.1 ov), 5/182 (Kapugedera, 39.5 ov), 6/248 (Kulasekara, 47.6 ov)

Indian Bowling
Bowler	Overs	Maidens	Runs	Wickets	Econ	Wides	NBs
Zaheer Khan	10	3	60	2	6.00	1	0
Sreesanth	8	0	52	0	6.50	0	2
Munaf Patel	9	0	41	0	4.55	1	0
Harbhajan Singh	10	0	50	1	5.00	1	0
Yuvraj Singh	10	0	49	2	4.90	0	0
Sachin Tendulkar	2	0	12	0	6.00	3	0
Virat Kohli	1	0	6	0	6.00	0	0

2nd innings

Indian Batting
Player	Status	Runs	Balls	4s	6s	Strike rate
Virender Sehwag	lbw b Malinga	0	2	0	0	0.00
Sachin Tendulkar	c Sangakkara b Malinga	18	14	2	0	128.57
Gautam Gambhir	b Perera	97	122	9	0	79.50
Virat Kohli	c & b Dilshan	35	49	4	0	71.42
Mahendra Singh Dhoni	not out	91	79	8	2	115.18
Yuvraj Singh	not out	21	24	2	0	87.50
Suresh Raina						
Harbhajan Singh						
Zaheer Khan						
Munaf Patel						
Sreesanth						
Extras	(b 1, lb 6, w 8)	15				
Total	(4 wickets; 48.2 overs)	277		25	2	

Fall of wickets: 1/0 (Sehwag, 0.2 ov), 2/31 (Tendulkar, 6.1 ov), 3/114 (Kohli, 21.4 ov), 4/223 (Gambhir, 41.2 ov)

Sri Lankan Bowling
Bowler	Overs	Maidens	Runs	Wickets	Econ	Wides	NBs
Lasith Malinga	9	0	42	2	4.66	2	0
Nuwan Kulasekara	8.2	0	64	0	7.68	0	0
Thisara Perera	9	0	55	1	6.11	2	0
Suraj Randiv	9	0	43	0	4.77	0	0
Tillakaratne Dilshan	5	0	27	1	5.40	1	0
Muttiah Muralitharan	8	0	39	0	4.87	1	0

== Post-match ceremony and celebrations ==
As soon as Mahendra Singh Dhoni's sixer had gone into the stands at 48.2 overs, the commentator Ravi Shastri had announced "Dhoni finishes off in style". Celebrations were special as Team India won World Cup in its own country and the stadium was filled with Indians cheering, screaming, waving flags of India. In the post-match presentation, the Sri Lankan captain Kumar Sangakkara said that the Indians batted very well, and "looks like you need to make something like 350 runs to put them under pressure." Then, Indian captain MS Dhoni said that he had added motivation to play well to justify some unexpected decisions he had made for this match, like playing Sreesanth instead of Ashwin, and promoting himself up the order above Yuvraj. Later, MS Dhoni was named Man of the Match for his powerful and match-winning batting display under pressure. Yuvraj Singh was named Man of the Tournament for good all-round performance with both bat and ball throughout the tournament.

After the presentation, an ecstatic Indian team first held the Cup amid showers of champagne and confetti. Some Indian players, including Harbhajan Singh, Sachin Tendulkar, and Yuvraj Singh, had tears in their eyes. The team then carried iconic player Tendulkar on a victory lap around the stadium. Coach Gary Kirsten was also carried around the ground later. The Indian players dedicated their victory to Tendulkar; Virat Kohli said, "he has carried the burden of the nation for 21 years. It is time we carried him on our shoulders." Gautam Gambhir dedicated the victory to the victims of the 26/11 Mumbai attacks, and to the soldiers guarding India's borders. Celebrations went on through the night in the team hotel. The victory prompted several firework displays and celebrations throughout India.

== Broadcast ==
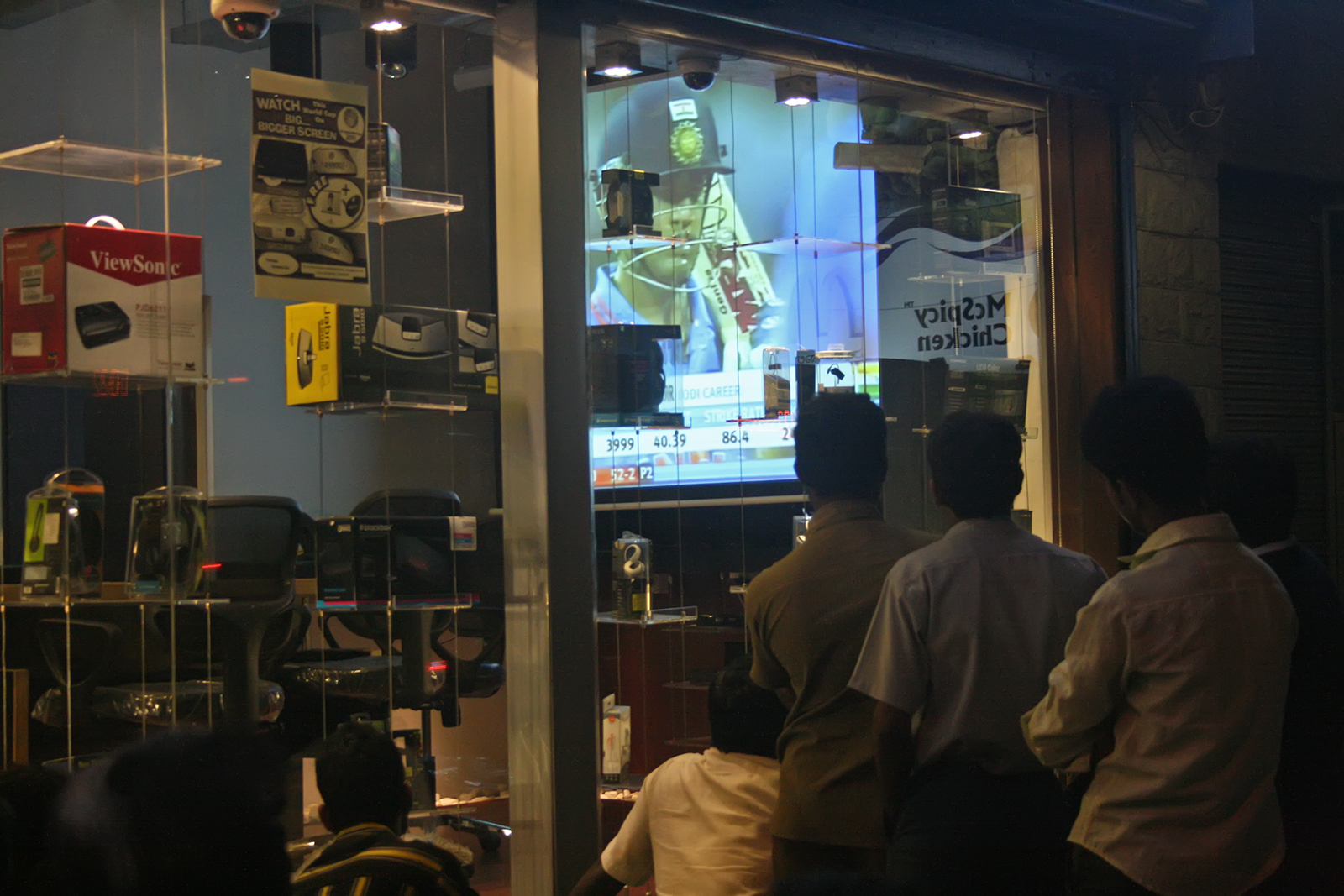
Indian fans view the match at a store in Bangalore

The final match was broadcast live in India on ESPN Star Sports' website and state-run free-to-air broadcasters Doordarshan and DD1. In Sri Lanka the match was on Sri Lanka Rupavahini Corporation's Channel Eye.

The ratings agencies TAM and aMap respectively recorded that 135 million people in India watched the final live, including 67.6 million Indian cable and satellite viewers. The game was watched by 13.6% of Indian TV-equipped households on average, with a peak of 21.44% at the end of the game. The match was also broadcast at many public places like in Mumbai's Chhatrapati Shivaji Maharaj International Airport Terminal 2A, and many malls in Mumbai like R City Mall, Phoenix Marketcity, and groups like Bharat Army celebrating at restaurants like Saltwater Lake and Pizza By The Bay. Mumbai CSMT was also a famous celebration spot, as after the final ball, many people emerged from local trains and started celebrating

== Aftermath ==
=== Reception in Sri Lanka ===
Though Sri Lankan spectators were initially disappointed, they eventually rallied behind their team and welcomed them at the airport with garlands, cheers, and celebration. Sri Lanka's excellent performance throughout the World Cup was appreciated, and it was recognised that reaching the final was a significant achievement in itself. Opening batsman Tillakaratne Dilshan was the highest run scorer in the tournament, with Sangakkara being the third highest (the second highest was Sachin Tendulkar of India). The Sri Lankan President Mahinda Rajapaksa hosted High Tea for the Sri Lankan players and spouses on the grounds of the Presidential residence, Temple Trees.

=== Reception in India ===
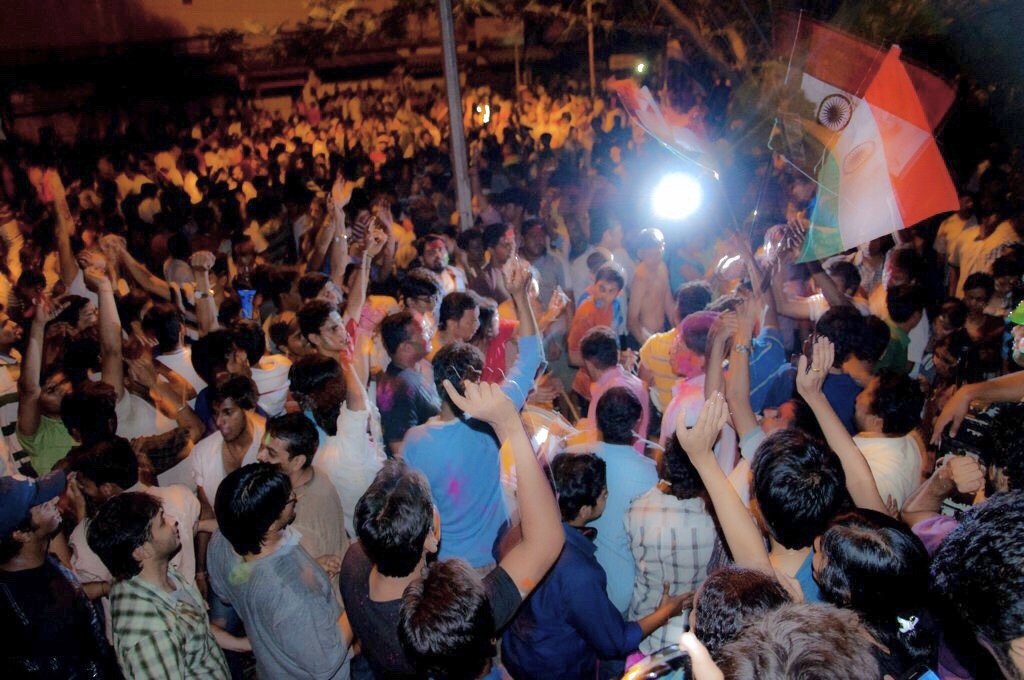
Indian fans celebrating in Pune following their country's triumph

Indian fans were ecstatic at the win, and at the overall performance of the team through the tournament. Celebrations went on through most of India over the weekend. The Indian President Pratibha Patil hosted High Tea for the Indian players and spouses on the grounds of the Raj Bhavan (Governor's House) in Mumbai. There was no ticker tape parade for the team on an open bus (as was organised after the 2007 Twenty20 World Cup win) because of the hectic schedule, with the 2011 edition of the Indian Premier League starting on 8 April.

=== Prizes for Indian players ===
Apart from the World Cup trophy itself, the Indian team was given many prizes from the cricket boards, various state governments, and public and private companies.

- The BCCI declared ₹20 million (US$430,000) reward for each member of World Cup-winning squad. Also, cash rewards of ₹5 million (US$107,000) and ₹2.5 crore (US$536,000) were announced for each member of support staff and selection committee respectively.
- ₹20 million (US$430,000) was awarded to Dhoni and ₹10 million (US$214,000) awarded to four Delhi players in the victorious team from the Delhi government.
- Various motor companies awarded cars including Hyundai India gave Vernas to the team, Ferrari gave a 599 GTO India edition to Dhoni, and Audi gave a car to Man of the Tournament Yuvraj Singh
- The Gujarat state government decided that both Munaf Patel and Yusuf Pathan would be awarded with the highest sports honours of the state – Eklavya Award.
- The Punjab government announced ₹10 million (US$214,000) each for both Harbhajan Singh and Yuvraj Singh.
- The Maharashtra government awarded ₹10 million (US$214,000) cash prize for Sachin Tendulkar, Zaheer Khan.
- The Karnataka government announced ₹2.5 million (US$54,000) to each of the 15 members in India's World Cup squad.
- Uttarakhand offered Dhoni a residential plot or house in the hill station of Mussoorie and a Pavilion will be built in the state in his honour.
- A real-estate firm gifted luxury villas worth a total of ₹90 crore (US$19.28 million) to Team India.

=== Changes in the Sri Lankan team ===
After some days of deliberation, Kumar Sangakkara, the Sri Lankan captain, announced on 5 April that he was resigning from the post of captain of the One Day International and Twenty20 sides in the long-term interest of the team. According to him, as he would be 37 by the time of the 2015 World Cup, could not be sure of his place in the side then and it would be better for a new captain to be groomed now, who would be at the peak of his career during that tournament. He stated he was willing to captain the team for the upcoming tours of England and possibly Australia if the selectors felt this would aid the transition to a new captaincy. A day after Sangakkara's announcement, Mahela Jayawardene resigned from the post of vice-captain, and Aravinda de Silva from the post of Chairman of Selectors.

== Match fixing allegations ==
In July 2017 the ex Sri Lanka cricket team captain Arjuna Ranatunga made a serious allegation that the cup final match between India and Sri Lanka was rigged. He demanded a probe into the events at the final match. The erstwhile Sri Lankan Sports Minister Mahindananda Aluthgamage also supported Ranatunga's match fixing allegations. However, three years later, Sri Lankan Police suspended the match fixing probe citing lack of sufficient evidence. Later International Cricket Council rubbished the match rigging claims made by Ranatunga and Aluthgamage.

== In popular culture ==
The match formed the climax of 2016 Indian film M.S. Dhoni : The Untold Story, the biopic of then Indian captain Mahendra Singh Dhoni. The archived footages of the actual match were used and the face of the lead actor Sushant Singh Rajput was used instead of Dhoni's face.

In Sachin Tendulkar's biopic documentary Sachin: A Billion Dreams the match is also a significant part of the story plot.
