= Ibrar Tipu =

Bangladeshi music director and singer

- ইবরার টিপু
- Born: Saidpur, Bangladesh
- Occupations: Music director, composer, Singer
- Known for: Music director, Singer

Ibrar Tipu is a Bangladeshi music director, composer and singer. As a singer and musician, he has sung many songs and he can play more than twenty musical instruments.

Tipu has appeared as a judge for reality TV talent competitions, and has also founded his own production company and music academy.

== Early life and education ==
Tipu grew up in a cultural family in Saidpur. He was enlisted for the Notun Kuri program at Rangpur Radio Station and ranked second in the final competition of tabla in 1985. He completed music education from the Dhaka International Music School.

== Career ==
Following his success as a tabla player, Tipu wanted to learn how to play more musical instruments: he learnt to play the guitar back in 1989 from a band named The Blues. He attended Indian classical music classes in 1983–84.

Tipu released his first album, Kuashar Prohor, in 1998. He later released his first solo album, Chena Ochena, in 2005. He started singing in movies in 2007 with a duet with Samina Chowdhury in the movie Tumi Amar Swami.

He was the composer and one of singer of official theme song for the ICC World Cup Cricket O Prithibi Ebar Ese Bangladesh Nao Chine in 2011.

In 2019 he started his own audio-video production house named 'Orni Records' with singer Bindu Kona.

In May 2021, Tipu opened up his own music school, the Ibrar Tipu Academy of Music, in Banasree, Dhaka.

In September 2021, he was named as a judge in the RTV talent show Young Stars, and played the piano for 20 hours over three days with all 81 contestants.
