= 2011 Cricket World Cup =

International cricket competition

- Tournament logo
- Dates: 19 February – 2 April 2011
- Administrator: International Cricket Council
- Cricket format: One Day International
- Tournament format(s): Round-robin and Knockout
- Hosts: India; Sri Lanka; Bangladesh
- Champions: India (2nd title)
- Runners-up: Sri Lanka
- Participants: 14 (from 104 entrants)
- Matches: 49
- Attendance: 1,229,826 (25,098 per match)
- Player of the series: (India) Yuvraj Singh
- Most runs: (Sri Lanka) Tillakaratne Dilshan (500)
- Most wickets: (Pakistan) Shahid Afridi (21); (India) Zaheer Khan (21)

The 2011 ICC Cricket World Cup was the tenth Cricket World Cup. It was played in India, Sri Lanka and Bangladesh, the latter hosting World Cup matches for the first time. India defeated Sri Lanka by six wickets in the final at Wankhede Stadium in Mumbai, thus becoming the first country to win the Cricket World Cup final on home soil. India's Yuvraj Singh was declared the player of the tournament. This was the first time in World Cup history that two Asian teams had contested the final. It was also the first time since the 1992 World Cup that the final did not feature Australia.

Fourteen national cricket teams took part in this tournament, including 10 full members and four associate members of the International Cricket Council (ICC). The opening ceremony was held on 17 February 2011 at National Stadium, Dhaka, and the tournament was played from 19 February to 2 April. The first match was played between India and Bangladesh at the Sher-e-Bangla National Stadium in Mirpur, Dhaka.

Pakistan was also scheduled to be a co-host, but after the 2009's terrorist attack on the Sri Lanka national cricket team in Lahore, the ICC cancelled that, and the headquarters of the organising committee, originally in Lahore, was transferred to Mumbai. Pakistan was to have held 14 matches, including one semi-final. Eight of the games (including the semi-final) were awarded to India, four to Sri Lanka, and two to Bangladesh.

== Host selection ==
The International Cricket Council (ICC) announced on 30 April 2006 which countries would host the 2011 World Cup. Australia and New Zealand had also bid for the tournament; if successful, they would have shared the hosting equally, leaving the location of the final still to be decided. The Trans–Tasman bid, Beyond Boundaries, was the only one delivered to the ICC headquarters in Dubai before the 1 March deadline, but the Asian bidders were granted an extension by the ICC. The New Zealand government had given assurance that Zimbabwe would be allowed to compete in the tournament, following political discussions in the country over whether their cricket team should be allowed to tour Zimbabwe in 2005.

The extra time needed for the Asian bid had weakened its prospects, but when the time came to vote, Asia won the hosting rights by ten votes to three. The Pakistan Cricket Board (PCB) has revealed that the vote of the West Indies Cricket Board was decisive, as the Asian bid had the support of South Africa and Zimbabwe as well as the four bidding countries. The Pakistani newspaper Dawn reported that the Asian countries had promised to hold fund-raising events for West Indian cricket during the 2007 World Cup, which may have influenced the vote. However, I. S. Bindra, chairman of the Monitoring Committee of the Asian bid, said that their promise of extra profits of around US$400 million had been decisive, that there "was no quid pro quo for their support", and that playing the West Indies had "nothing to do with the World Cup bid".

== Format ==
Late in 2007, the four host nations agreed on a revised format for the 2011 World Cup, identical to that of the 1996 World Cup, except that there would be 14 teams instead of 12. The first round of the tournament would consist of two groups of seven teams. Each team in a group would play all the others once, and the top four from each group would qualify for the quarter-finals. This ensured that every team would play at least six matches.

== Qualification ==
As per ICC regulations, all 10 full members automatically qualify for the World Cup, including Zimbabwe who have given up their Test playing status until the standard of their team improves.

The ICC also organised a qualifying tournament in South Africa to determine the four associate teams who would participate in the 2011 event. Ireland, who had been the best performing associate nation since the last World Cup, won the tournament, beating Canada in the final. The Netherlands and Kenya also qualified by virtue of finishing third and fourth respectively. All 4 associates kept their ODI status as well as Scotland who this time failed to qualify for the World Cup.

=== List of qualified teams ===
The following 14 teams qualified for the final tournament.

Group A		Group B	
Rank	Team	Rank	Team
Full Members
1	Australia	2	India (co-host)
3	Pakistan	4	South Africa
5	New Zealand	6	England
7	Sri Lanka (co-host)	8	West Indies
9	Zimbabwe	10	Bangladesh (co-host)
Associate Members
11	Canada	12	Ireland
13	Kenya	14	Netherlands

== Preparations ==
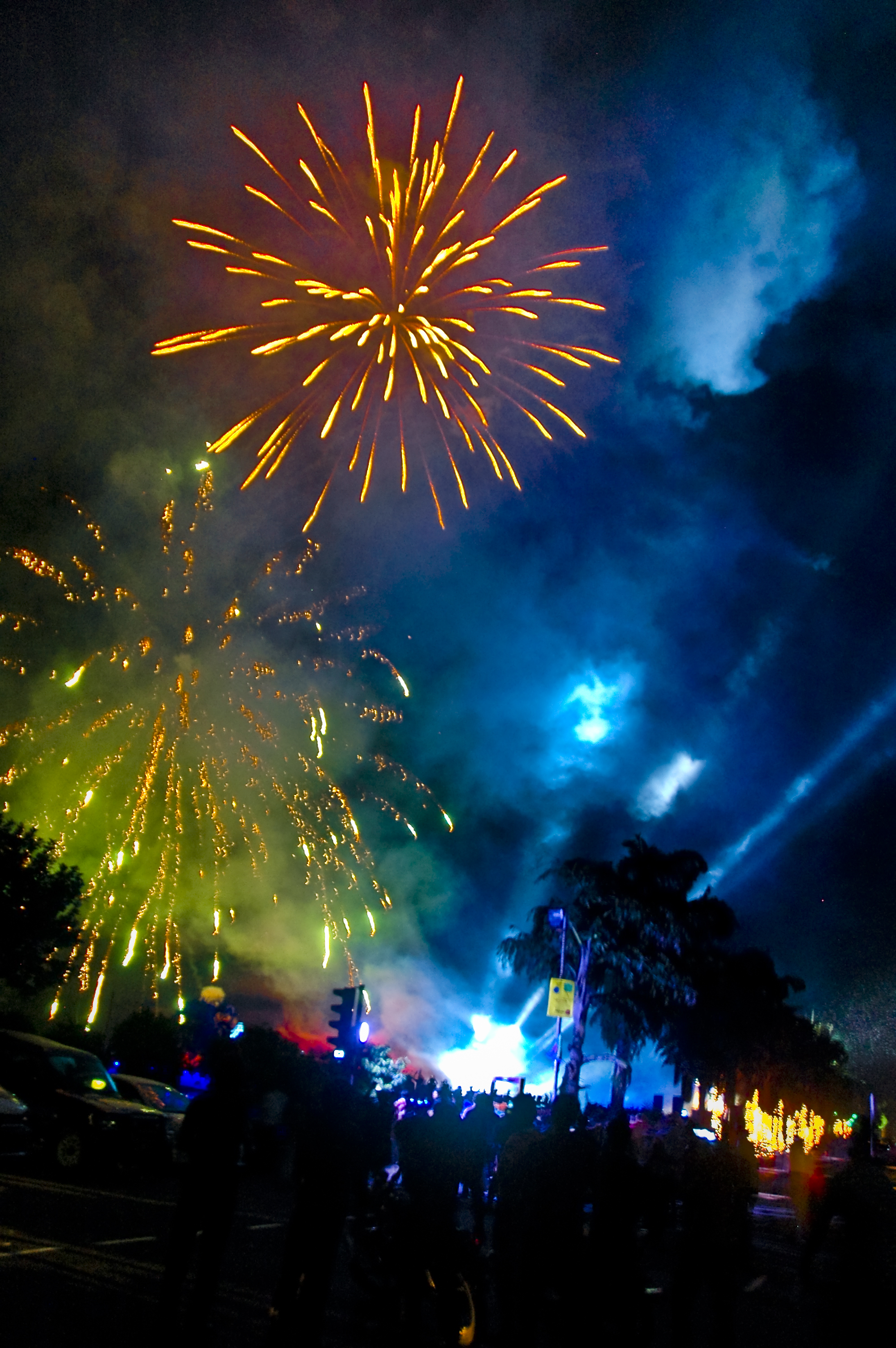
Fireworks at the opening ceremony

=== Pakistan loses co-host status ===
In April 2009, the ICC announced that Pakistan had lost its right to co-host the 2011 World Cup because of concerns about the "uncertain security situation" in the country, especially in the aftermath of the 2009 attack on the Sri Lanka national cricket team in Lahore. The PCB estimated that this would lose them $10.5 million.

On 9 April 2009, PCB chairman Ijaz Butt revealed that they had issued a legal notice to oppose ICC's decision. The ICC, however, claimed that the PCB was still a co-host, and that they had only relocated the matches out of Pakistan. Pakistan proposed that South Asia host the 2015 World Cup and that Australia and New Zealand host the 2011 event, but this option did not find favour with their co-hosts and was not implemented.

=== Allocation of matches ===
On 11 April 2006, PCB chairman Shahryar Khan announced an agreement on the allocation of games, under which India would host the final, Pakistan and Sri Lanka the semi-finals, and Bangladesh the opening ceremony. After being stripped of its status as a co-host, Pakistan proposed to host its allocated games in the United Arab Emirates as a neutral venue. They had played matches in Abu Dhabi, Dubai, and Sharjah in the preceding months. On 28 April 2009, however, the ICC announced that matches originally intended to be played in Pakistan would be reallocated. As a result, India hosted 29 matches across eight venues, including the final and one semi-final; Sri Lanka hosted 12 matches at three venues, including one semi-final; and Bangladesh hosted 8 matches at two grounds, as well as the opening ceremony on 17 February 2011.

On 1 June 2010, the first tranche of tickets were put on sale after a meeting of the tournament's Central Organising Committee in Mumbai. The cheapest tickets cost 20 US cents in Sri Lanka. In January 2011, the ICC declared the Eden Gardens ground in Kolkata, India, to be unfit and unlikely to be complete by 27 February, when it was scheduled to host a match between India and England. The match was moved to Bangalore.

=== Media and promotion ===
The World Cup has grown as a media event with each tournament. The ICC sold the broadcasting rights for the 2011 event to ESPN Star Sports and Star Cricket for around US$2 billion. For the first time, the tournament was broadcast in high-definition format, and it was to be covered by at least 27 cameras using recent technology. It was also planned to be shown across platforms such as online and mobile 3G. It was the first time that an ICC event had the Umpire Decision Review System (UDRS).

The final was watched live by 135 million people in India, as recorded by the ratings agencies TAM and aMap, including 67.6 million Indian cable and satellite viewers. The final was watched by 13.6% of Indian TV-equipped households on average, with a peak of 21.44% at the end of the game, thus beating the semi-final between India and Pakistan, which had an estimated 11.74% TV rating in India for the whole match.

The official event ambassador was Sachin Tendulkar.

==== Song ====
Album cover for "De Ghumake" released by Universal Music

De Ghuma Ke
The official song of the 2011 World Cup

The official song of the 2011 Cricket World Cup has three versions, in Bengali, Hindi and Sinhala, corresponding to the three host countries.

"O Prithibi Ebar Ese Bangladesh Ke Nao Chiney" (Bengali: ও পৃথিবী এবার এসে বাংলাদেশ নাও চিনে; English: O World It's Time Let Bangladesh Be Known), is a song composed by Ibrar Tipu and has been sung by Ibrar Tipu, Arnob, Mila, Balam, Kona and Elita Karim. The lyricist of the song is Zulfiqer Russell. It is the official welcome song for the 2011 world cup. It was released worldwide on February 17, 2011, at welcome ceremony.

De Ghuma Ke (Swing It Hard) is the Hindi version, composed by the trio of Shankar–Ehsaan–Loy (Shankar Mahadevan, Ehsaan Noorani and Loy Mendonsa). It employs an array of Indian rhythms combined with elements of rock and hip hop. It was released worldwide on 31 December 2010. The song's lyrics were written by Manoj Yadav. "We were looking at various ideas to determine what direction we can take because we wanted to make a fun song, a dhamaal song on which people can dance, they can sing and we wanted to use more of a colloquial term, which was an idea that came in late. Initially, we were looking at a regular dance song and by chance we coined this phrase De Ghuma Ke. Everyone got excited and said why not make a song around the phrase," said Shankar. The song uses Hindi colloquialisms like aare paare ("this way or that") and juta hausla badla faisla ("buck up and change the game"), and has a rousing quality. It incorporates an array of Indian rhythms, as well as elements of rock and hip-hop. The song, according to the composers, avoids both the cliches of patriotism and run-of-the-mill Bollywood beats for a "fun and funky tune" with a "folksy feel and a hint of rustic Punjabi". Each member has brought in the song his own unique talent and experience, combining the Carnatic and Hindustani vocal tradition, Western rock, fusion and synthesiser techniques.

The Sinhala version, "Sinha Udaane", was adapted by Sri Lankan R&B and hip hop artist Ranidu Lankage and composed by lyricist Shehan Galahitiyawa. Both songs were performed at the opening ceremony. "Sinha Udaane" was performed by Lankage.

Zulfiqer Russell, who pens the lyrics, tried to highlight the Liberation War, Language Movement, Cricket Team, Sunderbans, Cox's Bazar, and various aspects of the world. Composed by Ibrar Tipu, the song features music from classical to folk and danata, from Sanai to the traditional domestic tunes.

There was a lot of buzz about the song before it was released. Within two days of its release, De Ghuma Ke received nearly 7,000 hits on YouTube. In the next 30 days, over 0.5 million people listened to the song on YouTube. The song became quite popular among youths and cricket enthusiasts within days of its release.

==== Mascot ====
Stumpy, a young elephant, was the official mascot for the 2011 Cricket World Cup. He was unveiled at a function in Colombo, Sri Lanka, on 2 April 2010, and his name was revealed on 2 August 2010 after an online competition conducted by the ICC in the last week of July.

== Opening ceremony ==
The opening ceremony was held in the National Stadium, Dhaka, Bangladesh, on 17 February 2011, two days before the first match.

== Prize money ==
The 2011 Cricket World Cup winning team would be taking home a prize money of US$3 million and US$1.5 million for runner-up, with the ICC deciding to double the total allocation for the tournament to US$8.01 million. The winning team was also awarded a replica of the Cricket World Cup Trophy, a practice that originated in 1999. The decision was taken at the ICC Board meeting which was held in Dubai on 20 April 2010.

- US$250,000 – Losing quarter-finalists (4 teams)
- US$500,000 – Losing semi-finalists
- US$1,500,000 – Runners-up
- US$3,250,000 – Winners

== Venues ==
All the Indian stadiums for the tournament had been finalised by mid-October 2009, and those of Bangladesh and Sri Lanka in late October 2009. The ICC announced all the venues in Mumbai on 2 November 2009. Two new stadiums were constructed in Kandy and Sooriyawewa, Sri Lanka, for the event while a total of 7 matches were played down at the Premadasa, including a semi-final.

India
Kolkata	Chennai	Delhi	Nagpur	Ahmedabad
Eden Gardens	M. A. Chidambaram Stadium	Feroz Shah Kotla Stadium	Vidarbha Cricket; Association Stadium	Sardar Patel Stadium
Capacity: 66,349	Capacity: 50,000	Capacity: 41,820	Capacity: 45,000	Capacity: 54,000
	Mumbai	Mohali	Bangalore	
	Wankhede Stadium	Punjab Cricket; Association Stadium	M. Chinnaswamy Stadium	
	Capacity: 33,108	Capacity: 26,950	Capacity: 40,000	
Sri Lanka			Bangladesh	
Colombo	Kandy	Sooriyawewa	Chittagong	Dhaka
R. Premadasa Stadium	Pallekele International; Cricket Stadium	Mahinda Rajapaksa; International Cricket Stadium	Zohur Ahmed Chowdhury Stadium	Sher-e-Bangla; National Cricket Stadium
Capacity: 35,000	Capacity: 35,000	Capacity: 35,000	Capacity: 20,000	Capacity: 26,000

Venues in India	Venues in Sri Lanka	Venues in Bangladesh

== Match officials ==
The umpire selection panel selected 18 umpires excluding a reserve umpire, Enamul Haque (Bangladesh) to officiate at the World Cup: five from Australia, three from England, two each from India, New Zealand, Pakistan and Sri Lanka, and one each from South Africa and the West Indies.

== Squads ==
Each country chose a 30-member preliminary squad, which would then be reduced to 15. All the 14 teams announced their final squads before 19 January 2011. Sachin Tendulkar of India played in his sixth consecutive world cup, equalling the record of Pakistan's Javed Miandad.

== Warm-up matches ==
The following 14 warm-up matches were played before the World Cup started, between 12 February and 18 February 2011. All 14 nations that were qualified to take part in the World Cup participated in a series of matches to prepare, experiment with different tactics and to help them acclimatise to conditions in the Indian subcontinent. The warm-up matches were not classified as One Day Internationals by the ICC, despite sharing some of main features of this form of cricket, but some of the playing regulations were different from standard internationals in order to allow teams to experiment. For example, the main change allowed for thirteen different players to play in a match – nine players being allowed to both bat and bowl, with two only being able to bowl and two only being able to bat – instead of the eleven players normally allowed.

England, India, Sri Lanka and South Africa were the only teams to win both of their warm-up games, while Australia, Canada, Kenya and Zimbabwe did not win either of their fixtures.

=== Match status ===
As of 2007, none of the warm-up games were officially recognised as ODIs or List A matches by the ICC due to various changes in the rules of the game, and this continued into the 2011 World Cup. While normally only 11 players are allowed to bat and field (excluding situations involving a substitute fielder), 13 players were used in each team's squad for the matches – 11 of whom were allowed to field at one time and 11 of whom were allowed to bat (meaning players could be swapped in and out when fielding or bowling, but two players did not bat in a match). In official ICC matches match referees are required to help officiate a game, but due to the changes in the rules none were appointed for any of the warm-up games.

=== Matches ===
Warm-up matches

12 February 2011
Scorecard

West Indies; 253/8 (50 overs)	v	Kenya; 192 (45.3 overs)

West Indies won by 61 runs
R. Premadasa Stadium, Colombo

12 February 2011
Scorecard

Sri Lanka; 351/5 (50 overs)	v	Netherlands; 195 (47.3 overs)

Sri Lanka won by 156 runs
Singhalese Sports Club Cricket Ground, Colombo

12 February 2011 (D/N)
Scorecard

Canada; 112 (37.3 overs)	v	Bangladesh; 113/1 (19.2 overs)

Bangladesh won by 9 wickets
Zohur Ahmed Chowdhury Stadium, Chittagong

12 February 2011 (D/N)
Scorecard

New Zealand; 311/6 (50 overs)	v	Ireland; 279 (48.2 overs)

New Zealand won by 32 runs
Vidarbha Cricket Association Stadium, Nagpur

12 February 2011 (D/N)
Scorecard

Zimbabwe; 152 (41.5 overs)	v	South Africa; 153/2 (23.3 overs)

South Africa won by 8 wickets
M. A. Chidambaram Stadium, Chennai

13 February 2011 (D/N)
Scorecard

India; 214 (44.3 overs)	v	Australia; 176 (37.5 overs)

India won by 38 runs
M. Chinnaswamy Stadium, Bangalore

15 February 2011
Scorecard

Zimbabwe; 244/8 (50 overs)	v	Ireland; 245/6 (49.3 overs)

Ireland won by 4 wickets
Vidarbha Cricket Association Stadium, Nagpur

15 February 2011
Scorecard

Kenya; 263/5 (50 overs)	v	Netherlands; 264/8 (49.1 overs)

Netherlands won by 2 wickets
Singhalese Sports Club Cricket Ground, Colombo

15 February 2011 (D/N)
Scorecard

Pakistan; 285/9 (50 overs)	v	Bangladesh; 196 (41.4 overs)

Pakistan won by 89 runs
Sher-e-Bangla National Cricket Stadium, Dhaka

15 February 2011 (D/N)
Scorecard

Australia; 217 (47.1 overs)	v	South Africa; 218/1 (44.2 overs)

South Africa won by 9 wickets
M. Chinnaswamy Stadium, Bangalore

15 February 2011 (D/N)
Scorecard

West Indies; 281 (50 overs)	v	Sri Lanka; 282/6 (47.3 overs)

Sri Lanka won by 4 wickets
R. Premadasa Stadium, Colombo

16 February 2011
Scorecard

England; 243 (49.4 overs)	v	Canada; 227 (46.1 overs)

England won by 16 runs
Fatullah Osmani Stadium, Fatullah

16 February 2011 (D/N)
Scorecard

India; 360/5 (50 overs)	v	New Zealand; 243 (43.1 overs)

India won by 117 runs
M. A. Chidambaram Stadium, Chennai

18 February 2011 (D/N)
Scorecard

England; 273 (49.4 overs)	v	Pakistan; 206 (46.1 overs)

England won by 67 runs
Fatullah Osmani Stadium, Fatullah

== Schedule and results ==
=== Group stage ===
==== Group A ====
Pos	Team	Pld	W	L	T	NR	Pts	NRR
1	Pakistan	6	5	1	0	0	10	0.758
2	Sri Lanka	6	4	1	0	1	9	2.582
3	Australia	6	4	1	0	1	9	1.123
4	New Zealand	6	4	2	0	0	8	1.135
5	Zimbabwe	6	2	4	0	0	4	0.030
6	Canada	6	1	5	0	0	2	−1.987
7	Kenya	6	0	6	0	0	0	−3.042

Source: ESPNcricinfo

The top four teams from each group qualified for the quarter-finals (indicated in green).

20 February 2011
Scorecard

Kenya; 69 (23.5 overs)	v	New Zealand; 72/0 (8 overs)

New Zealand won by 10 wickets
M. A. Chidambaram Stadium, Chennai

20 February 2011 (D/N)
Scorecard

Sri Lanka; 332/7 (50 overs)	v	Canada; 122 (36.5 overs)

Sri Lanka won by 210 runs
Mahinda Rajapaksa International Cricket Stadium, Sooriyawewa

21 February 2011 (D/N)
Scorecard

Australia; 262/6 (50 overs)	v	Zimbabwe; 171 (46.2 overs)

Australia won by 91 runs
Sardar Patel Stadium, Ahmedabad

23 February 2011 (D/N)
Scorecard

Pakistan; 317/7 (50 overs)	v	Kenya; 112 (33.1 overs)

Pakistan won by 205 runs
Mahinda Rajapaksa International Cricket Stadium, Sooriyawewa

25 February 2011
Scorecard

New Zealand; 206 (45.1 overs)	v	Australia; 207/3 (34 overs)

Australia won by 7 wickets
Vidarbha Cricket Association Stadium, Nagpur

26 February 2011 (D/N)
Scorecard

Pakistan; 277/7 (50 overs)	v	Sri Lanka; 266/9 (50 overs)

Pakistan won by 11 runs
R. Premadasa Stadium, Colombo

28 February 2011
Scorecard

Zimbabwe; 298/9 (50 overs)	v	Canada; 123 (42.1 overs)

Zimbabwe won by 175 runs
Vidarbha Cricket Association Stadium, Nagpur

1 March 2011 (D/N)
Scorecard

Kenya; 142 (43.4 overs)	v	Sri Lanka; 146/1 (18.4 overs)

Sri Lanka won by 9 wickets
R. Premadasa Stadium, Colombo

3 March 2011 (D/N)
Scorecard

Pakistan; 184 (43 overs)	v	Canada; 138 (42.5 overs)

Pakistan won by 46 runs
R. Premadasa Stadium, Colombo

4 March 2011 (D/N)
Scorecard

Zimbabwe; 162 (46.2 overs)	v	New Zealand; 166/0 (33.3 overs)

New Zealand won by 10 wickets
Sardar Patel Stadium, Ahmedabad

5 March 2011 (D/N)
Scorecard

Sri Lanka; 146/3 (32.5 overs)	v	Australia

No result
R. Premadasa Stadium, Colombo

7 March 2011 (D/N)
Scorecard

Kenya; 198 (50 overs)	v	Canada; 199/5 (45.3 overs)

Canada won by 5 wickets
Feroz Shah Kotla Stadium, Delhi

8 March 2011 (D/N)
Scorecard

New Zealand; 302/7 (50 overs)	v	Pakistan; 192 (41.4 overs)

New Zealand won by 110 runs
Pallekele International Cricket Stadium, Kandy

10 March 2011 (D/N)
Scorecard

Sri Lanka; 327/6 (50 overs)	v	Zimbabwe; 188 (39 overs)

Sri Lanka won by 139 runs
Pallekele International Cricket Stadium, Kandy

13 March 2011 (D/N)
Scorecard

New Zealand; 358/6 (50 overs)	v	Canada; 261/9 (50 overs)

New Zealand won by 97 runs
Wankhede Stadium, Mumbai

13 March 2011 (D/N)
Scorecard

Australia; 324/6 (50 overs)	v	Kenya; 264/6 (50 overs)

Australia won by 60 runs
M. Chinnaswamy Stadium, Bangalore

14 March 2011 (D/N)
Scorecard

Zimbabwe; 151/7 (39.4 overs)	v	Pakistan; 164/3 (34.1 overs)

Pakistan won by 7 wickets (DLS Method)
Pallekele International Cricket Stadium, Kandy

16 March 2011 (D/N)
Scorecard

Canada; 211 (45.4 overs)	v	Australia; 212/3 (34.5 overs)

Australia won by 7 wickets
M. Chinnaswamy Stadium, Bangalore

18 March 2011 (D/N)
Scorecard

Sri Lanka; 265/9 (50 overs)	v	New Zealand; 153 (35 overs)

Sri Lanka won by 112 runs
Wankhede Stadium, Mumbai

19 March 2011 (D/N)
Scorecard

Australia; 176 (46.4 overs)	v	Pakistan; 178/6 (41 overs)

Pakistan won by 4 wickets
R. Premadasa Stadium, Colombo

20 March 2011
Scorecard

Zimbabwe; 308/6 (50 overs)	v	Kenya; 147 (36 overs)

Zimbabwe won by 161 runs
Eden Gardens, Kolkata

==== Group B ====
Pos	Team	Pld	W	L	T	NR	Pts	NRR
1	South Africa	6	5	1	0	0	10	2.026
2	India	6	4	1	1	0	9	0.900
3	England	6	3	2	1	0	7	0.072
4	West Indies	6	3	3	0	0	6	1.066
5	Bangladesh	6	3	3	0	0	6	−1.361
6	Ireland	6	2	4	0	0	4	−0.696
7	Netherlands	6	0	6	0	0	0	−2.045

Source: ESPNcricinfo

The top four teams from each group qualified for the Quarter finals (indicated in green).

19 February 2011 (D/N)
Scorecard

India; 370/4 (50 overs)	v	Bangladesh; 283/9 (50 overs)

India won by 87 runs
Sher-e-Bangla National Cricket Stadium, Dhaka

22 February 2011 (D/N)
Scorecard

Netherlands; 292/6 (50 overs)	v	England; 296/4 (48.4 overs)

England won by 6 wickets
Vidarbha Cricket Association Stadium, Nagpur

24 February 2011 (D/N)
Scorecard

West Indies; 222 (47.3 overs)	v	South Africa; 223/3 (42.5 overs)

South Africa won by 7 wickets
Feroz Shah Kotla Stadium, Delhi

25 February 2011 (D/N)
Scorecard

Bangladesh; 205 (49.2 overs)	v	Ireland; 178 (45 overs)

Bangladesh won by 27 runs
Sher-e-Bangla National Cricket Stadium, Dhaka

27 February 2011 (D/N)
Scorecard

India; 338 (49.5 overs)	v	England; 338/8 (50 overs)

Match Tied
M. Chinnaswamy Stadium, Bangalore

28 February 2011 (D/N)
Scorecard

West Indies; 330/8 (50 overs)	v	Netherlands; 115 (31.3 overs)

West Indies won by 215 runs
Feroz Shah Kotla Stadium, Delhi

2 March 2011 (D/N)
Scorecard

England; 327/8 (50 overs)	v	Ireland; 329/7 (49.1 overs)

Ireland won by 3 wickets
M. Chinnaswamy Stadium, Bangalore

3 March 2011
Scorecard

South Africa; 351/5 (50 overs)	v	Netherlands; 120 (34.5 overs)

South Africa won by 231 runs
Punjab Cricket Association Stadium, Mohali

4 March 2011 (D/N)
Scorecard

Bangladesh; 58 (18.5 overs)	v	West Indies; 59/1 (12.2 overs)

West Indies won by 9 wickets
Sher-e-Bangla National Cricket Stadium, Dhaka

6 March 2011
Scorecard

England; 171 (45.4 overs)	v	South Africa; 165 (47.4 overs)

England won by 6 runs
M. A. Chidambaram Stadium, Chennai

6 March 2011 (D/N)
Scorecard

Ireland; 207 (47.5 overs)	v	India; 210/5 (46.0 overs)

India won by 5 wickets
M. Chinnaswamy Stadium, Bangalore

9 March 2011 (D/N)
Scorecard

Netherlands; 189 (46.4 overs)	v	India; 191/5 (36.3 overs)

India won by 5 wickets
Feroz Shah Kotla Stadium, Delhi

11 March 2011
Scorecard

West Indies; 275 (50 overs)	v	Ireland; 231 (49 overs)

West Indies won by 44 runs
Punjab Cricket Association Stadium, Mohali

11 March 2011 (D/N)
Scorecard

England; 225 (49.4 overs)	v	Bangladesh; 227/8 (49 overs)

Bangladesh won by 2 wickets
Zohur Ahmed Chowdhury Stadium, Chittagong

12 March 2011 (D/N)
Scorecard

India; 296 (48.4 overs)	v	South Africa; 300/7 (49.4 overs)

South Africa won by 3 wickets (2 balls left)
Vidarbha Cricket Association Stadium, Nagpur

14 March 2011 (D/N)
Scorecard

Netherlands; 160 (46.2 overs)	v	Bangladesh; 166/4 (40.2 overs)

Bangladesh won by 6 wickets
Zohur Ahmed Chowdhury Stadium, Chittagong

15 March 2011 (D/N)
Scorecard

South Africa; 272/7 (50 overs)	v	Ireland; 141 (33.2 overs)

South Africa won by 131 runs
Eden Gardens, Kolkata

17 March 2011 (D/N)
Scorecard

England; 243 (48.4 overs)	v	West Indies; 225 (44.4 overs)

England won by 18 runs
M. A. Chidambaram Stadium, Chennai

18 March 2011
Scorecard

Netherlands; 306 (50 overs)	v	Ireland; 307/4 (47.4 overs)

Ireland won by 6 wickets
Eden Gardens, Kolkata

19 March 2011
Scorecard

South Africa; 284/8 (50 overs)	v	Bangladesh; 78 (28 overs)

South Africa won by 206 runs
Sher-e-Bangla National Cricket Stadium, Dhaka

20 March 2011 (D/N)
Scorecard

India; 268 (49.1 overs)	v	West Indies; 188 (43 overs)

India won by 80 runs
M. A. Chidambaram Stadium, Chennai

== Knockout stage ==
The knockout stage was the second and final stage of the 2011 Cricket World Cup. It featured the top four teams from each group (8 total) and contested as a single-elimination tournament. This was the first tournament in which a one-over eliminator would be used to decide matches that finished as ties; however, this decider was not required. India and Sri Lanka reached the final, where India chased down Sri Lanka's total of 274 runs for the loss of just four wickets to claim their second Cricket World Cup title.

=== Tournament bracket ===
Quarter-finals
23 March – Dhaka, Bangladesh
West Indies	112
Pakistan	113/0
24 March – Ahmedabad, India
Australia	260/6
India	261/5
25 March – Dhaka, Bangladesh
New Zealand	221/8
South Africa	172
26 March – Colombo, Sri Lanka
England	229/6
Sri Lanka	231/0

Semi-finals
30 March – Mohali, India
Pakistan	231
India	260/9
29 March – Colombo, Sri Lanka
New Zealand	217
Sri Lanka	220/5

Final
2 April – Mumbai, India
India	277/4
Sri Lanka	274/6

=== Matches ===
==== Quarter-finals ====
West Indies vs Pakistan

23 March 2011
14:30 (D/N)
Scorecard

West Indies; 112 (43.3 overs)	v	Pakistan; 113/0 (20.5 overs)
Shivnarine Chanderpaul 44* (106); Shahid Afridi 4/30 (9.3 overs)		Mohammad Hafeez 61* (64)

Pakistan won by 10 wickets
Sher-e-Bangla National Cricket Stadium, Dhaka
Umpires: Billy Bowden (NZ) and Steve Davis (Aus)
Player of the match: Mohammad Hafeez (Pak)

- West Indies won the toss and elected to bat.

West Indies won the toss and elected to bat first. They lost early wickets and never recovered, being bowled out for 112. Pakistan won without losing a wicket. This was the West Indies' lowest score in the knockout stages. With this win, Pakistan has reached at least the Semi Final stages in five consecutive ICC tournaments, including one ICC Champions Trophy and three ICC World Twenty20.

Australia vs India

24 March 2011
14:30 (D/N)
Scorecard

Australia; 260/6 (50 overs)	v	India; 261/5 (47.4 overs)
Ricky Ponting 104 (118); Yuvraj Singh 2/44 (10 overs)		Yuvraj Singh 57* (65); David Hussey 1/19 (5 overs)

India won by 5 wickets
Sardar Patel Stadium, Ahmedabad
Umpires: Marais Erasmus (SA) and Ian Gould (Eng)
Player of the match: Yuvraj Singh (Ind)

- Australia won the toss and elected to bat.

Australia's loss to India ended their 12-year reign as ODI world champions. Australia posted 260 for 6 wickets at the end of their innings with Ricky Ponting scoring 104 runs. In response, India chased down the target with 14 balls to spare. India's innings was built on half-centuries by Sachin Tendulkar, Gautam Gambhir and Yuvraj Singh, as well as an unbroken partnership of 74 between Yuvraj and Suresh Raina. Yuvraj won the man of the match.

- Jason Krejza and Shaun Tait (Both Aus) played his last ODI.

New Zealand vs South Africa

25 March 2011
14:30 (D/N)
Scorecard

New Zealand; 221/8 (50 overs)	v	South Africa; 172 (43.2 overs)
Jesse Ryder 83 (121); Morné Morkel 3/46 (8 overs)		Jacques Kallis 47 (75); Jacob Oram 4/39 (9 overs)

New Zealand won by 49 runs
Sher-e-Bangla National Cricket Stadium, Dhaka
Umpires: Aleem Dar (Pak) and Rod Tucker (Aus)
Player of the match: Jacob Oram (NZ)

- New Zealand won the toss and elected to bat.

This was the sixth time New Zealand had qualified for the semi-final, equalling Australia's and Pakistan's record.

England vs Sri Lanka

26 March 2011
14:30 (D/N)
Scorecard

England; 229/6 (50 overs)	v	Sri Lanka; 231/0 (39.3 overs)
Jonathan Trott 86 (115); Muttiah Muralitharan 2/54 (9 overs)		Tillakaratne Dilshan 108* (115)

Sri Lanka won by 10 wickets
R. Premadasa Stadium, Colombo
Umpires: Billy Doctrove (WI) and Simon Taufel (Aus)
Player of the match: Tillakaratne Dilshan (SL)

- England won the toss and elected to bat.

Tillakaratne Dilshan and Upul Tharanga both made centuries as Sri Lanka chased down a target of 230 to win by ten wickets; this run chase set a new record for the highest successful run chase in a ten-wicket victory in ODI history.

==== Semi-finals ====
New Zealand vs Sri Lanka

29 March 2011
14:30 (D/N)
Scorecard

New Zealand; 217 (48.5 overs)	v	Sri Lanka; 220/5 (47.5 overs)
Scott Styris 57 (77); Ajantha Mendis 3/35 (9.5 overs)		Tillakaratne Dilshan 73 (93); Tim Southee 3/57 (10 overs)

Sri Lanka won by 5 wickets
R. Premadasa Stadium, Colombo
Umpires: Aleem Dar (Pak) and Steve Davis (Aus)
Player of the match: Kumar Sangakkara (SL)

- New Zealand won the toss and elected to bat.
- Sri Lanka qualified for the final for third time after 1996 and 2007.

For a second consecutive time Sri Lanka defeated New Zealand in the semi-finals of the World Cup and made it to the finals. This was the last match Muttiah Muralitharan played on Sri Lankan soil.

India vs Pakistan

30 March 2011
14:30 (D/N)
Scorecard

India; 260/9 (50 overs)	v	Pakistan; 231 (49.5 overs)
Sachin Tendulkar 85 (115); Wahab Riaz 5/46 (10 overs)		Misbah-ul-Haq 56 (76); Ashish Nehra 2/33 (10 overs)

India won by 29 runs
Punjab Cricket Association Stadium, Mohali
Umpires: Ian Gould (Eng) and Simon Taufel (Aus)
Player of the match: Sachin Tendulkar (Ind)

- India won the toss and elected to bat
- India qualified for the final for third time after 1983 and 2003.
- Ashish Nehra (Ind) played his last ODI.

The match was attended by the prime ministers of both the countries, Yusuf Raza Gilani of Pakistan and Manmohan Singh of India. Anti-aircraft missiles were deployed at Mohali to prevent any air attacks. The local airport was full of private jets, and an estimated one billion people saw the match on television. Tickets for the match were selling for over ten times their normal selling price on the black market.

India won the toss and elected to bat first. Sachin Tendulkar was dropped four times and survived an early leg before wicket decision before being dismissed for 85. India finished with a total of 260. Pakistan had a steady start, but India kept taking wickets and won by 29 runs.

After the match was over Indian and Pakistani leaders pledged to resolve their differences, including cooperation in the investigation of the 2008 Mumbai attacks. Additionally the skies over Delhi were lit up with large numbers of fireworks.

==== Final ====
2 April 2011
14:30 (D/N)
Scorecard

Sri Lanka; 274/6 (50 overs)	v	India; 277/4 (48.2 overs)
Mahela Jayawardene 103* (88); Yuvraj Singh 2/49 (10 overs)		Gautam Gambhir 97 (122); Lasith Malinga 2/42 (9 overs)

India won by 6 wickets
Wankhede Stadium, Mumbai
Umpires: Simon Taufel (Aus) and Aleem Dar (Pak)
Player of the match: MS Dhoni (Ind)

- Sri Lanka won the toss and elected to bat.
- Sreesanth (Ind), Muttiah Muralitharan and Thilan Samaraweera (SL) played in their last ODI.

This was Sri Lanka's second consecutive loss in a World Cup Final and was also Muttiah Muralitharan's last ODI match, as well as Sachin Tendulkar's last World Cup match, having been playing World Cups for India since 1992. This match also recorded the highest successful run chase by any team in a World Cup Final and also only the third time that a team batting second had won the World Cup Final. This was also the first time that a host nation in their own country won the World Cup.

The final was played on 2 April between India and Sri Lanka at Wankhede Stadium, Mumbai. India were crowned champions after winning by six wickets with only 10 balls remaining. India captain MS Dhoni was named man of the match after an unbeaten, match-winning innings of 91 runs off 79 balls, including the final shot that won the game. Gautam Gambhir contributed with a crucial knock of 97 after India lost early wickets. After the match, the Indian players paid tribute to Sachin Tendulkar, who was playing in his last World Cup. The final had a viewership of about 558 million people all over the world.

== Statistics ==
=== Most runs ===
Player	Team	Runs
Tillakaratne Dilshan	Sri Lanka	500
Sachin Tendulkar	India	482
Kumar Sangakkara	Sri Lanka	465
Jonathan Trott	England	422
Upul Tharanga	Sri Lanka	395

- Source: ESPNcricinfo

=== Most wickets ===
Player	Team	Wickets
Zaheer Khan	India	21
Shahid Afridi	Pakistan	21
Tim Southee	New Zealand	18
Robin Peterson	South Africa	15
Muttiah Muralitharan	Sri Lanka	15
Yuvraj Singh	India	15

- Source: ESPNcricinfo

=== Team of the tournament ===
- (India) Sachin Tendulkar
- (Sri Lanka) Tillakaratne Dilshan
- (Sri Lanka) Kumar Sangakkara (c & wk)
- (Sri Lanka) Mahela Jayawardene
- (South Africa) AB de Villiers
- (India) Yuvraj Singh
- (Australia) Shane Watson
- (Pakistan) Shahid Afridi
- (South Africa) Dale Steyn
- (India) Zaheer Khan
- (Sri Lanka) Muttiah Muralitharan
- (New Zealand) Tim Southee (12th man)

== Controversies ==
- Bangladeshi fans threw rocks at the West Indies team bus as it returned players to their hotel after their win over Bangladesh in Dhaka on 4 March. It was later claimed that the rock-throwers had confused the bus with the Bangladesh team bus. The elite Rapid Action Battalion of Bangladesh arrested 38 people after the attack, and the West Indies later received an apology.
- The political party Shiv Sena threatened to disrupt the final in Mumbai if the Pakistani team qualified.
- During the group stage match between India and England, Ian Bell was given not out for leg before wicket despite the ball hitting him in line with the wickets and being on a path to hit the stumps. India captain MS Dhoni referred the decision to the TV umpire, who confirmed the original decision as the ball had struck Bell at a point more than 2.5 m (8 ft 2 in) from the stumps, a point at which the reliability of the Hawk-Eye system diminishes below acceptable levels. Dhoni later complained that the rule had deprived his team of what seemed like an obvious wicket. The rules were subsequently revised and the umpires were given new guidelines. The Sri Lankan captain, Kumar Sangakkara, later criticised the decision to alter the 2.5-metre rule while a tournament was in progress.
- In the final between India and Sri Lanka, loud crowd noise prevented match referee Jeff Crowe from hearing Sri Lanka captain Kumar Sangakkara's call as the coin was tossed by India captain MS Dhoni. The toss had to be redone – an extremely unusual event, especially at an event as prominent as the World Cup final. The second toss was won by Sri Lanka.
- In June 2020, it was alleged that the final match was fixed and Sri Lanka sold the match to India. Former Sri Lankan Sports Minister Mahindananda Aluthgamage said, "The 2011 Cricket World Cup final was fixed. I stand by what I say. It took place when I was the Minister of Sports." Earlier, former Sri Lankan captain Arjuna Ranatunga also claimed the final to be fixed and demanded a probe into the matter. However, in July 2020, the investigation was dropped, after no supporting evidence could be provided to verify the allegations. The ICC added that they did not have a reason to doubt the integrity of the tournament's final.

== In media ==
- Footage of the final match was purchased by makers and used in their film M.S. Dhoni: The Untold Story (2016), a Bollywood film based on India captain MS Dhoni.
