= 2011 Cricket World Cup Group B =

Play in Group B of the 2011 Cricket World Cup took place from 19 February to 20 March 2011. The group consisted of hosts India and Bangladesh, along with England, Ireland, Netherlands, West Indies and South Africa. The top four teams advanced to the quarter-finals.

== Standings ==
| Pos | Team | Pld | W | L | T | NR | Pts | NRR |
|---|---|---|---|---|---|---|---|---|
| 1 | South Africa | 6 | 5 | 1 | 0 | 0 | 10 | 2.026 |
| 2 | India | 6 | 4 | 1 | 1 | 0 | 9 | 0.900 |
| 3 | England | 6 | 3 | 2 | 1 | 0 | 7 | 0.072 |
| 4 | West Indies | 6 | 3 | 3 | 0 | 0 | 6 | 1.066 |
| 5 | Bangladesh | 6 | 3 | 3 | 0 | 0 | 6 | −1.361 |
| 6 | Ireland | 6 | 2 | 4 | 0 | 0 | 4 | −0.696 |
| 7 | Netherlands | 6 | 0 | 6 | 0 | 0 | 0 | −2.045 |

Source: ESPNcricinfo

== Matches ==
- All times local UTC+05:30 (India and Sri Lanka) or UTC+06:00 (Bangladesh)

=== India vs Bangladesh ===
19 February 2011
14:30 (D/N)
Scorecard

| India; 370/4 (50 overs) | v | Bangladesh; 283/9 (50 overs) |
| Virender Sehwag 175 (140); Mahmudullah 1/49 (7 overs) | | Tamim Iqbal 70 (86); Munaf Patel 4/48 (10 overs) |

India won by 87 runs
Sher-e-Bangla National Cricket Stadium, Dhaka
Umpires: Steve Davis (Aus) and Kumar Dharmasena (SL)
Player of the match: Virender Sehwag (Ind)

- Bangladesh won the toss and elected to field.

The World Cup opened with a match between co-hosts Bangladesh and India, with this being the only match India, the hot favorites, were not playing at home in the tournament. Bangladesh captain Shakib Al Hasan won the toss and sent India in to bat; however his decision was quickly proved wrong. Virender Sehwag hit the first ball of the tournament for four, and he along with Sachin Tendulkar added 69 for the first wicket at over a run a ball until the latter was run out after a mix-up. Sehwag and Gautam Gambhir then had their team cruise to 152/1, when Gambhir was bowled by Mahmudullah but that did not stop Sehwag, who cruised to his century and then rapidly accelerated along with Virat Kohli. India cruised past 300, and Sehwag posted a career-best 175 before getting out, and Kohli also got his ton as India posted a daunting 370/4 at the end of their 50 overs.

Bangladesh started off rapidly in their chase, getting 51 runs in the first five overs without losing a wicket; but soon, at the score of 56, Imrul Kayes played on to a Munaf Patel delivery. Tamim Iqbal got a half-century, but the Bangladesh run-rate slowed after that and they weren't in the hunt, and at the end they got to 283/9 without really challenging the Indian total.

Virender Sehwag's score of 175 was his 14th ODI hundred, and the fourth highest score in the history of the Cricket World Cup.

=== Netherlands vs England ===
22 February 2011
14:30 (D/N)
Scorecard

| Netherlands; 292/6 (50 overs) | v | England; 296/4 (48.4 overs) |
| Ryan ten Doeschate 119 (110); Graeme Swann 2/35 (10 overs) | | Andrew Strauss 88 (83); Ryan ten Doeschate 2/47 (10 overs) |

England won by 6 wickets
Vidarbha Cricket Association Stadium, Nagpur
Umpires: Asad Rauf (Pak) and Bruce Oxenford (Aus)
Player of the match: Ryan ten Doeschate (Ned)

- Netherlands won the toss and elected to bat.

Netherlands captain Peter Borren won the toss and elected to bat first against England, one of the contenders for the trophy. Netherlands started well, with openers Alex Kervezee and Wesley Barresi going at a quick pace but England fought back, getting both openers soon after; and after 33 overs, Netherlands were 149/4. Then Ryan ten Doeschate accelerated, and went on to score a brilliant century, and this, coupled with very poor fielding from England, helped Netherlands plunder 104 runs off the last ten overs and lead them to a strong 292/6.

The English started off very strongly in their reply, getting their first 100 runs at a run a ball without losing a wicket. Kevin Pietersen fell soon after, but Netherlands were unable to build on it. England captain Andrew Strauss closed in on a century but holed out and all the England top order batsmen scored runs, with Paul Collingwood and Ravi Bopara taking England home with 1.2 overs to spare.

The Netherlands score of 292 was the second highest score from an Associate nation playing against a Test nation.

=== West Indies vs South Africa ===
24 February 2011
14:30 (D/N)
Scorecard

| West Indies; 222 (47.3 overs) | v | South Africa; 223/3 (42.5 overs) |
| Darren Bravo 73 (82); Imran Tahir 4/41 (10 overs) | | AB de Villiers 107* (105); Kieron Pollard 1/37 (7.5 overs) |

South Africa won by 7 wickets
Feroz Shah Kotla Stadium, Delhi
Umpires: Amiesh Saheba (Ind) and Simon Taufel (Aus)
Player of the match: AB de Villiers (SA)

- South Africa won the toss and elected to field.
- Drizzle halted the match for almost 8 minutes.
- Imran Tahir (SA) made his ODI debut.

South Africa, another one of the pre-tournament favorites played their first match of the tournament against a West Indies team which is currently in transition. South Africa won the toss, set West Indies in to bat, and opened the bowling with spinner Johan Botha, which was vindicated as he got the wicket of Chris Gayle in the first over. Darren Bravo then came into the crease and played an aggressive knock of 73, with support from Devon Smith in a strong century stand until Botha trapped Bravo in front. Two quick wickets on debut by Imran Tahir left West Indies on 120/4 but a counterattack from Dwayne Bravo, who was well assisted by Shivnarine Chanderpaul took West Indies to a healthy 209/5 with over 7 overs left. However, Tahir returned to get the wickets of Chanderpaul and Devon Thomas, the other set batsman before Dale Steyn cleaned up the tail to restrict the West Indies to 222.

South Africa stuttered at the start of their reply, with Hashim Amla and Jacques Kallis falling cheaply early on. AB de Villiers then came into the crease and counterattacked with a string of boundaries, reaching his half-century at close to a run-a-ball. He and captain Graeme Smith had over a century partnership for the third wicket until Kieron Pollard got one through Smith's defences. This, however turned out to a false dawn for West Indies, as de Villers reached his century off 97 balls, and together with JP Duminy got the remaining 84 runs with over seven overs left.

AB de Villiers century was the fastest by a South African in the World Cup and the South African victory was the 12th successive win against the West Indies.

=== Bangladesh vs Ireland ===
25 February 2011
14:30 (D/N)
Scorecard

| Bangladesh; 205 (49.2 overs) | v | Ireland; 178 (45 overs) |
| Tamim Iqbal 44 (43); Andre Botha 3/32 (9 overs) | | Niall O'Brien 38 (52); Shafiul Islam 4/21 (8 overs) |

Bangladesh won by 27 runs
Sher-e-Bangla National Cricket Stadium, Dhaka
Umpires: Aleem Dar (Pak) and Rod Tucker (Aus)
Player of the match: Tamim Iqbal (Ban)

- Bangladesh won the toss and elected to bat.

Bangladesh captain Shakib Al Hasan won the toss against Ireland and elected to bat, after conceding 370 against India after setting them in. His decision seemed to be vindicated at the start of Bangladesh's innings, with Tamim Iqbal unleashing a flurry of boundaries immediately, to take Bangladesh to 49/0 after 5 overs. Ireland needed a moment of inspiration and they got it from wicketkeeper Niall O'Brien who did a brilliant stumping to send Imrul Kayes on his way. Ireland quickly built on it, with a direct hit from Ed Joyce catching Junaid Siddiqui short, before both Tamim and Shakib were also dismissed softly. Mushfiqur Rahim and Raqibul Hasan staged a recovery then, and at 147/4 in the 34th over, Bangladesh looked well set for a score above 250 until Mushfiqur top-edged a sweep of George Dockrell. This triggered another collapse, and only a late cameo from Naeem Islam took Bangladesh to 205.

Ireland started off solidly in their reply, but then the Bangladesh spinners led by Shakib and Mohammad Ashraful took wickets at regular intervals. The match was evenly poised with Ireland 93/4 after 25 overs. Niall O'Brien was the key to the chase but with the score at 110, he was dismissed after a brilliant catch by Tamim Iqbal. Kevin O'Brien continued to fight, taking Ireland above 150 and giving them another sniff at victory till he holed out to deep square-leg off Shafiul Islam. A pumped-up Shafiul then ran through the tail, and Ireland were all out for 178, falling 27 runs short.

Shafiul Islam recorded the best figures for a Bangladeshi bowler in World Cup matches, with 4/21.

=== India vs England ===
27 February 2011
14:30 (D/N)
Scorecard

| India; 338 (49.5 overs) | v | England; 338/8 (50 overs) |
| Sachin Tendulkar 120 (115); Tim Bresnan 5/48 (10 overs) | | Andrew Strauss 158 (145); Zaheer Khan 3/64 (10 overs) |

Match tied
M. Chinnaswamy Stadium, Bangalore
Umpires: Billy Bowden (NZ) and Marais Erasmus (SA)
Player of the match: Andrew Strauss (Eng)

- India won the toss and elected to bat.

Having scored 370 in their previous game, India elected to bat after winning the toss against England. Virender Sehwag, fresh from his 175 the previous game blazed away at the start of the innings, hitting a rapid 35 before falling to Tim Bresnan. Sachin Tendulkar then took over the innings, and was ably assisted by Gautam Gambhir. The duo continued at a very rapid pace and added 133 runs until Gambhir was bowled by Graeme Swann for 51. Tendulkar went on to get his hundred, his 47th in ODIs and fifth at World Cups, the most by anyone in the history of the tournament. When he was eventually dismissed for 120, India were strongly placed at 236/3 in the 39th over. Yuvraj Singh and MS Dhoni continued on at a brisk pace, with Yuvraj reaching his fifty off just 45 balls. India passed 300 in the 45th over, but then Yuvraj and Dhoni fell off consecutive balls to trigger a collapse. Bresnan took three wickets in four balls to get his five-for, his first in ODIs, and India did not bat their 50 overs, being all out for 338 with a ball left.

England got off to a very strong start in their chase, with both Andrew Strauss and Kevin Pietersen going a rapid pace. Pietersen was dismissed for 31 in a freak way off Munaf Patel, but Strauss went on to get his fifty. Jonathan Trott was unable to convert a start, but Strauss and Ian Bell then indulged in a sensational stand of 170 runs for the third wicket. The duo also easily kept the required run rate well under control, keeping it around 7. Strauss reached his century off just 99 balls, and Bell took 45 to reach his half-century. England were 280/2 after 42 overs, when Zaheer Khan produced a sensational over, getting Bell caught at mid-off for 69 and catching Strauss plumb in front for a brilliant 158, his highest score in ODIs. Paul Collingwood and Matt Prior went cheaply, but some lusty blows from Bresnan and Swann kept England in the hunt, with 14 required off the last over. Swann managed 3 off the first 2 balls before Ajmal Shahzad hit a six off the third to leave England with just 5 from 3. A single and a two later meant that 2 was required off the last ball with all three results possible. Swann dug the last ball from Patel away for a single, which meant that the game was tied.

=== West Indies vs Netherlands ===
28 February 2011
14:30 (D/N)
Scorecard

| West Indies; 330/8 (50 overs) | v | Netherlands; 115 (31.3 overs) |
| Chris Gayle 80 (110); Mudassar Bukhari 2/65 (10 overs) | | Tom Cooper 55* (72); Kemar Roach 6/27 (8.3 overs) |

West Indies won by 215 runs
Feroz Shah Kotla Stadium, Delhi
Umpires: Amiesh Saheba (Ind) and Simon Taufel (Aus)
Player of the match: Kemar Roach (WI)

- Netherlands won the toss and elected to field.

West Indian bowler Kemar Roach took a hat-trick with the final three balls of the game and became the first West Indian player to take a hat-trick in a World Cup match.

=== England vs Ireland ===
2 March 2011
14:30 (D/N)
Scorecard

| England; 327/8 (50 overs) | v | Ireland; 329/7 (49.1 overs) |
| Jonathan Trott 92 (92); Trent Johnston 2/58 (10 overs) | | Kevin O'Brien 113 (63); Graeme Swann 3/47 (10 overs) |

Ireland won by 3 wickets
M. Chinnaswamy Stadium, Bangalore
Umpires: Aleem Dar (Pak) and Billy Bowden (NZ)
Player of the match: Kevin O'Brien (Ire)

- England won the toss and elected to bat.

England batted first with Jonathan Trott making 92 from 92 balls. During his innings, Trott reached 1,000 runs in ODI cricket, from just 21 innings, equalling the record set by Viv Richards and teammate Kevin Pietersen. England finished on 327/8 from their 50 overs. In reply, Ireland lost their captain, William Porterfield with the very first ball, and were struggling at 111/5. Kevin O'Brien then made 100 in just 50 balls, the fastest century in World Cup history. Ireland chased down the 327 set by England, winning by three wickets. It was the largest successful run chase in World Cup history, until Pakistan surpassed this in 2023.

=== South Africa vs Netherlands ===
3 March 2011
09:30
Scorecard

| South Africa; 351/5 (50 overs) | v | Netherlands; 120 (34.5 overs) |
| AB de Villiers 134 (98); Ryan ten Doeschate 3/72 (10 overs) | | Wesley Barresi 44 (66); Imran Tahir 3/19 (6.5 overs) |

South Africa won by 231 runs
Punjab Cricket Association Stadium, Mohali
Umpires: Asoka de Silva (SL) and Richard Kettleborough (Eng)
Player of the match: AB de Villiers (SA)

- Netherlands won the toss and elected to field.

AB de Villiers made his 11th ODI century, with 134 runs from 98 balls. His partnership of 221 runs with Hashim Amla is the highest ODI total in Mohali.

=== Bangladesh vs West Indies ===
4 March 2011
14:30 (D/N)
Scorecard

| Bangladesh; 58 (18.5 overs) | v | West Indies; 59/1 (12.2 overs) |
| Junaid Siddique 25 (27); Sulieman Benn 4/18 (5.5 overs) | | Chris Gayle 37* (36); Naeem Islam 1/14 (6 overs) |

West Indies won by 9 wickets
Sher-e-Bangla National Cricket Stadium, Dhaka
Umpires: Steve Davis (Aus) and Kumar Dharmasena (SL)
Player of the match: Kemar Roach (WI)

- Bangladesh won the toss and elected to bat.

Bangladesh were bowled out for 58 runs, which was their lowest ODI score, and the fourth lowest score in World Cup matches. In reply, the West Indian opener Chris Gayle finished 37* and made his 8,000th ODI run.

=== England vs South Africa ===
6 March 2011
09:30
Scorecard

| England; 171 (45.4 overs) | v | South Africa; 165 (47.4 overs) |
| Ravi Bopara 60 (98); Imran Tahir 4/38 (8.4 overs) | | Hashim Amla 42 (51); Stuart Broad 4/15 (6.4 overs) |

England won by 6 runs
M. A. Chidambaram Stadium, Chennai
Umpires: Amiesh Saheba (Ind) and Simon Taufel (Aus)
Player of the match: Ravi Bopara (Eng)

- England won the toss and elected to bat.

England batted first and lost the wickets of Andrew Strauss and Kevin Pietersen in the first over. Jonathan Trott and Ravi Bopara put on a partnership worth 99 runs, but England finished all out for 171, with four overs still remaining. In reply, South Africa reached 124 with the loss of just three wickets, but then lost the next four wickets inside five overs for three runs. Stuart Broad took the final two wickets, to give England victory by six runs.

=== India vs Ireland ===
6 March 2011
14:30 (D/N)
Scorecard

| Ireland; 207 (47.5 overs) | v | India; 210/5 (46 overs) |
| William Porterfield 75 (104); Yuvraj Singh 5/31 (10 overs) | | Yuvraj Singh 50* (75); Trent Johnston 2/16 (5 overs) |

India won by 5 wickets
M. Chinnaswamy Stadium, Bangalore
Umpires: Billy Bowden (NZ) and Rod Tucker (Aus)
Player of the match: Yuvraj Singh (Ind)

- India won the toss and elected to field.

Yuvraj Singh became the first player to score a 50 and take 5 wickets in a World Cup match.

=== India vs Netherlands ===
9 March 2011
14:30 (D/N)
Scorecard

| Netherlands; 189 (46.4 overs) | v | India; 191/5 (36.3 overs) |
| Peter Borren 38 (36); Zaheer Khan 3/20 (6.4 overs) | | Yuvraj Singh 51* (73); Pieter Seelaar 3/53 (10 overs) |

India won by 5 wickets
Feroz Shah Kotla Stadium, Delhi
Umpires: Steve Davis (Aus) and Bruce Oxenford (Aus)
Player of the match: Yuvraj Singh (Ind)

- Netherlands won the toss and elected to bat.

During the match, Sachin Tendulkar became the first player to score more than 2,000 runs in World Cup cricket. Yuvraj Singh took his 100th ODI wicket, with the dismissal of Wesley Barresi.

- Piyush Chawla (Ind) played his last ODI.

=== West Indies vs Ireland ===
11 March 2011
09:30
Scorecard

| West Indies; 275 (50 overs) | v | Ireland; 231 (49 overs) |
| Devon Smith 107 (133); Kevin O'Brien 4/71 (9 overs) | | Ed Joyce 84 (106); Sulieman Benn 4/53 (10 overs) |

West Indies won by 44 runs
Punjab Cricket Association Stadium, Mohali
Umpires: Asoka de Silva (SL) and Shavir Tarapore (Ind)
Player of the match: Kieron Pollard (WI)

- Ireland won the toss and elected to field.
- Andre Russell (WI) made his ODI debut.

=== Bangladesh vs England ===
11 March 2011
14:30 (D/N)
Scorecard

| England; 225 (49.4 overs) | v | Bangladesh; 227/8 (49 overs) |
| Jonathan Trott 67 (99); Naeem Islam 2/29 (8 overs) | | Imrul Kayes 60 (100); Ajmal Shahzad 3/43 (10 overs) |

Bangladesh won by 2 wickets
Zohur Ahmed Chowdhury Stadium, Chittagong
Umpires: Daryl Harper (Aus) and Rod Tucker (Aus)
Player of the match: Imrul Kayes (Ban)

- Bangladesh won the toss and elected to field.

Bangladesh's score was at one point 169/8 but tail ender 58 run partnership brought victory for the team. Bangladesh's win in this match was only their second against England in a total of 15 ODIs.

=== India vs South Africa ===
12 March 2011
14:30 (D/N)
Scorecard

| India; 296 (48.4 overs) | v | South Africa; 300/7 (49.4 overs) |
| Sachin Tendulkar 111 (101); Dale Steyn 5/50 (9.4 overs) | | Jacques Kallis 69 (88); Harbhajan Singh 3/53 (9 overs) |

South Africa won by 3 wickets
Vidarbha Cricket Association Stadium, Nagpur
Umpires: Ian Gould (Eng) and Simon Taufel (Aus)
Player of the match: Dale Steyn (SA)

- India won the toss and elected to bat.

India won the toss and chose to bat. Sachin Tendulkar and Virender Sehwag put on 142 for the first wicket. India reached 267 before the next wicket fell. India then lost their next 8 wickets for 29 runs, to finish with a total 296 all out.

=== Bangladesh vs Netherlands ===
14 March 2011
09:30
Scorecard

| Netherlands; 160 (46.2 overs) | v | Bangladesh; 166/4 (41.2 overs) |
| Ryan ten Doeschate 53* (71); Abdur Razzak 3/29 (10 overs) | | Imrul Kayes 73* (113); Tom Cooper 2/33 (7.2 overs) |

Bangladesh won by 6 wickets
Zohur Ahmed Chowdhury Stadium, Chittagong
Umpires: Aleem Dar (Pak) and Rod Tucker (Aus)
Player of the match: Imrul Kayes (Ban)

- Netherlands won the toss and elected to bat.

=== Ireland vs South Africa ===
15 March 2011
14:30 (D/N)
Scorecard

| South Africa; 272/7 (50 overs) | v | Ireland; 141 (33.2 overs) |
| JP Duminy 99 (103); John Mooney 1/36 (8 overs) | | Gary Wilson 31 (48); Robin Peterson 3/32 (8 overs) |

South Africa won by 131 runs
Eden Gardens, Kolkata
Umpires: Kumar Dharmasena (SL) and Billy Doctrove (WI)
Player of the match: JP Duminy (SA)

- Ireland won the toss and elected to field.

After this victory, South Africa became the first team to qualify for the quarter-finals from Group B. Ireland were eliminated following this defeat.

=== England vs West Indies ===
17 March 2011
14:30 (D/N)
Scorecard

| England; 243 (48.4 overs) | v | West Indies; 225 (44.4 overs) |
| Jonathan Trott 47 (38); Andre Russell 4/49 (8 overs) | | Andre Russell 49 (46); James Tredwell 4/48 (10 overs) |

England won by 18 runs
M. A. Chidambaram Stadium, Chennai
Umpires: Steve Davis (Aus) and Bruce Oxenford (Aus)
Player of the match: James Tredwell (Eng)

- England won the toss and elected to bat.
- Devendra Bishoo (WI) made his ODI debut.

England had to win the game to have any realistic chance of going through to the quarter-finals, and 243 all out looked like a difficult score to defend, especially with the poor fielding that had plagued England throughout the tournament. However, the West Indies collapsed to 225 all out, after a spectacular run out by Matt Prior.

=== Ireland vs Netherlands ===
18 March 2011
09:30
Scorecard

| Netherlands; 306 (50 overs) | v | Ireland; 307/4 (47.4 overs) |
| Ryan ten Doeschate 106 (108); Paul Stirling 2/51 (10 overs) | | Paul Stirling 101 (72); Tom Cooper 2/31 (7 overs) |

Ireland won by 6 wickets
Eden Gardens, Kolkata
Umpires: Billy Doctrove (WI) and Ian Gould (Eng)
Player of the match: Paul Stirling (Ire)

- Ireland won the toss and elected to field.

=== Bangladesh vs South Africa ===
19 March 2011
09:30
Scorecard

| South Africa; 284/8 (50 overs) | v | Bangladesh; 78 (28 overs) |
| Jacques Kallis 69 (76); Rubel Hossain 3/56 (8 overs) | | Shakib Al Hasan 30 (49); Robin Peterson 4/12 (7 overs) |

South Africa won by 206 runs
Sher-e-Bangla National Cricket Stadium, Dhaka
Umpires: Aleem Dar (Pak) and Daryl Harper (Aus)
Player of the match: Lonwabo Tsotsobe (SA)

- South Africa won the toss and elected to bat.

This was Bangladesh's second lowest score in the World Cup and the sixth in their ODI history. Bangladesh managed seven runs in the bowling Powerplay, the lowest in the tournament, trumping Kenya who had made nine runs against Sri Lanka. After this victory by South Africa, India and England are qualified for Quarter-finals from Group B.

=== India vs West Indies ===
20 March 2011
14:30 (D/N)
Scorecard

| India; 268 (49.1 overs) | v | West Indies; 188 (43 overs) |
| Yuvraj Singh 113 (123); Ravi Rampaul 5/51 (10 overs) | | Devon Smith 81 (97); Zaheer Khan 3/26 (6 overs) |

India won by 80 runs
M. A. Chidambaram Stadium, Chennai
Umpires: Steve Davis (Aus) and Simon Taufel (Aus)
Player of the match: Yuvraj Singh (Ind)

- India won the toss and elected to bat.
- Kirk Edwards (WI) made his ODI debut.

Virender Sehwag did not play due to knee problems.
