= 2011 Cricket World Cup Group A =

Play in Group A of the 2011 Cricket World Cup took place from 20 February to 20 March 2011. The group consisted of hosts Sri Lanka, and along with them, Pakistan, Canada, Kenya, New Zealand, Australia and Zimbabwe. This phase of the tournament was played as a full round-robin amongst all seven teams, with the top four teams advancing to the quarter-finals.

== Standings ==
Pos	Team	Pld	W	L	T	NR	Pts	NRR
1	Pakistan	6	5	1	0	0	10	0.758
2	Sri Lanka	6	4	1	0	1	9	2.582
3	Australia	6	4	1	0	1	9	1.123
4	New Zealand	6	4	2	0	0	8	1.135
5	Zimbabwe	6	2	4	0	0	4	0.030
6	Canada	6	1	5	0	0	2	−1.987
7	Kenya	6	0	6	0	0	0	−3.042

Source: ESPNcricinfo

== Matches ==
- All times local UTC+05:30 (India and Sri Lanka) and UTC+06:00 (Bangladesh)

=== Kenya vs New Zealand ===
20 February 2011
09:30
Scorecard

Kenya; 69 (23.5 overs)	v	New Zealand; 72/0 (8 overs)
Rakep Patel 16* (23); Hamish Bennett 4/16 (5 overs)		Martin Guptill 39* (32); Thomas Odoyo 0/25 (3 overs)

New Zealand won by 10 wickets
M. A. Chidambaram Stadium, Chennai
Umpires: Marais Erasmus (SA) and Rod Tucker (Aus)
Player of the match: Hamish Bennett (NZ)

- Kenya won the toss and elected to bat.

The first match of Group A saw Kenya taking on the New Zealanders. Kenya won the toss and elected to bat first on a pitch which seemed to have a lot of runs. However, the New Zealanders started very well, restricting the Kenyans for runs throughout the first 6 overs. The pressure paid off as Tim Southee trapped Alex Obanda in front with the score at 16 after 7 overs. Fellow opener Seren Waters and Collins Obuya tried to rebuild but Hamish Bennett came into the attack and got Waters lbw to make the score 40/2. Bennett then ripped through the Kenyan batting and got 3 more wickets in double-quick time to reduce the Kenyans to 49/5. The shattered Kenyans then folded, with only Rakep Patel offering resistance with 16 not out as Southee and Jacob Oram finished off the tail to get Kenya all out for 69 in 23.5 overs.

The New Zealand openers started off quickly in their small chase, with Martin Guptill doing most of the early scoring. Brendon McCullum was bowled off a free hit but got into his stride and finished off the game with two successive boundaries, as New Zealand reached their target in just eight overs without losing any wicket, to complete a ten-wicket win.

=== Sri Lanka vs Canada ===
20 February 2011
14:30 (D/N)
Scorecard

Sri Lanka; 332/7 (50 overs)	v	Canada; 122 (36.5 overs)
Mahela Jayawardene 100 (81); John Davison 2/56 (8 overs)		Rizwan Cheema 37 (35); Nuwan Kulasekara 3/16 (6 overs)

Sri Lanka won by 210 runs
Mahinda Rajapaksa International Cricket Stadium, Sooriyawewa
Umpires: Ian Gould (Eng) and Shavir Tarapore (Ind)
Player of the match: Mahela Jayawardene (SL)

- Sri Lanka won the toss and elected to bat.

Sri Lanka, one of the co-hosts started off their tournament against minnows Canada. The Sri Lankans won the toss and elected to bat first. Canada bowled well in the early overs, but did not get a wicket, as openers Upul Tharanga and Tillakaratne Dilshan reached 50 runs. When the first wicket did fall, it was a run-out when the batsmen had a mix-up with the score at 63, and Tharanga was dismissed. Dilshan got to his half-century, but fell trying to go for a big hit. The Canadians restricted Sri Lanka to 88/2 with over 19 overs bowled; but the two experienced Sri Lankan batsmen, captain Kumar Sangakkara and Mahela Jayawardene came together and got a partnership of 50. Both batsmen got the run rate to over 6 and both seemed to be coasting to their centuries, until Sangakkara on 92 gave a simple return catch to John Davison with the score at 267/2. Jayawardene reached his century but fell immediately afterwards. More wickets fell and the game got hot-tempered, with a confrontation between Angelo Mathews and Harvir Baidwan and Sri Lanka finished with 332/7.

The Canadian chase went nowhere, with Thisara Perera and Nuwan Kulasekara getting three wickets quickly. Captain Ashish Bagai tried to lead a recovery, but once Perera took his wicket to reduce Canada to 53/5, all doubts about the result finished. Big-hitter Rizwan Cheema took 37, including two huge sixes off spinner Muttiah Muralitharan, but the latter ultimately got his wicket as Canada fell to 122 all out.

=== Australia vs Zimbabwe ===
21 February 2011
14:30 (D/N)
Scorecard

Australia; 262/6 (50 overs)	v	Zimbabwe; 171 (46.2 overs)
Shane Watson 79 (92); Chris Mpofu 2/58 (9 overs)		Graeme Cremer 37 (51); Mitchell Johnson 4/19 (9.2 overs)

Australia won by 91 runs
Sardar Patel Stadium, Ahmedabad
Umpires: Asoka de Silva (SL) and Richard Kettleborough (Eng)
Player of the match: Shane Watson (Aus)

- Australia won the toss and elected to bat.

Three-time defending champions Australia opened their tournament against Zimbabwe. Australia won the toss and elected to bat; but it was the Zimbabwean spinners who dominated the early stages despite not getting a wicket; as Australia struggled to 32/0 after 13 overs. The 14th over was hit for 17 runs as the score quickly reached 50, but soon after, Prosper Utseya got Brad Haddin lbw, which was given out of referral. Shane Watson then attacked aggressively as he added 79 with captain Ricky Ponting until Watson was out lbw off Graeme Cremer in similar fashion to Haddin's. Ponting was soon run out, but Michael Clarke and Cameron White took the score past 200 until White was bowled. Clarke reached a half-century, and quick cameos by David Hussey and Steve Smith took Australia to 262/6.

The Zimbabwean reply was disappointing, as the Australian pace trio of Brett Lee, Shaun Tait and Mitchell Johnson reduced Zimbabwe to 44/4. The Zimabweans had some small partnerships going; but that was little resistance as they were all out of 171, with Johnson getting 4 wickets.

Australian captain Ricky Ponting was handed down a Level 1 charge by the ICC, after he damaged a television set in the dressing room following his run-out.

=== Kenya vs Pakistan ===
23 February 2011
14:30 (D/N)
Scorecard

Pakistan; 317/7 (50 overs)	v	Kenya; 112 (33.1 overs)
Umar Akmal 71 (52); Thomas Odoyo 3/41 (7 overs)		Collins Obuya 47 (58); Shahid Afridi 5/16 (8 overs)

Pakistan won by 205 runs
Mahinda Rajapaksa International Cricket Stadium, Sooriyawewa
Umpires: Tony Hill (NZ) and Nigel Llong (Eng)
Player of the match: Umar Akmal (Pak)

- Pakistan won the toss and elected to bat.

Pakistan, who were on a poor run of form before this World Cup faced off against Kenya. Pakistan captain Shahid Afridi won the toss and elected to bat first but it was the Kenyan bowlers who struck early, getting opens Mohammad Hafeez and Ahmed Shehzad out early on, leaving Pakistan at 12/2 at the end of 7 overs. Kamran Akmal and Younis Khan then began a rebuilding partnership of 98, until Kamran fell shortly after reaching his half-century. Younis also reached a half-century and fell immediately, before Misbah-ul-Haq and Umar Akmal hit a rapid 118-run partnership, with the latter especially being severe on the bowlers in his 71 off 52 balls. Both men fell towards the end of the innings as Pakistan reached 317/7, helped quite substantially by the Kenyan bowling which conceded 46 extras.

Kenya started off solidly in their big chase, with openers Morris Ouma and Seren Waters adding 37 for the first wicket until a direct hit from Umar Akmal had the latter run out. The Kenyans fought during the first half of their innings, getting to 73/2 before Shahid Afridi bowled Steve Tikolo. He then ran through the lower middle order and the tail with ease, and ended up with figures of 5/16 from 8 overs as Kenya collapsed to 112 all out, with the only resistance offered by Collins Obuya's 47.

Afridi took the best figures for a Pakistan bowler in the World Cup, with 5/16. Kenya bowled 37 wides, equaling the record set by the West Indies, also against Pakistan, in 1989.

=== Australia vs New Zealand ===
25 February 2011
09:30
Scorecard

New Zealand; 206 (45.1 overs)	v	Australia; 207/3 (34 overs)
Nathan McCullum 52 (76); Mitchell Johnson 4/33 (9.1 overs)		Shane Watson 62 (61); Hamish Bennett 2/63 (7 overs)

Australia won by 7 wickets
Vidarbha Cricket Association Stadium, Nagpur
Umpires: Kumar Dharmasena (SL) and Billy Doctrove (WI)
Player of the match: Mitchell Johnson (Aus)

- Australia won the toss and elected to field.

New Zealand and Australia and both won their first games easily, and now the Tasman neighbours faced off against each other where the winner would get two wins out of two. Australian captain Ricky Ponting won the toss and asked New Zealand to bat. Opener Brendon McCullum blazed away at the start of the innings until Shaun Tait had him caught at third man. New Zealand progressed at a steady run rate after that, reaching 66/2 for after 13 overs until Tait and Mitchell Johnson unleashed a good spell of bowling which resulted in a collapse of 4 wickets for 7 runs. New Zealand showed resistance after that as Nathan McCullum scored a half-century, and Daniel Vettori a quick 44, which allowed them to get 206.

Australia started rapidly in their chase thanks to Brad Haddin, who went a well over a run a ball right from the start and quickly reached his half-century. Shane Watson was quiet in the opening phase but soon got into the stride, and Australia reached 100 in just 14 overs. Watson didn't take too much longer to reach his half-century either, and although Hamish Bennett offered New Zealand a ray of hope by getting Watson and Haddin out in the same over, Michael Clarke and Cameron White guided Australia hope with ease within 34 overs, with 7 wickets to spare.

Australian batsman Michael Clarke reached 6,000 One Day International runs in his 174 innings during this match. This match was used to decide the annual Chappell–Hadlee Trophy for the 2010–11 season, as Australia and New Zealand did not play any other ODIs against each other during the season.

=== Pakistan vs Sri Lanka ===
26 February 2011
14:30 (D/N)
Scorecard

Pakistan; 277/7 (50 overs)	v	Sri Lanka; 266/9 (50 overs)
Misbah-ul-Haq 83* (91); Rangana Herath 2/46 (10 overs)		Chamara Silva 57 (78); Shahid Afridi 4/34 (10 overs)

Pakistan won by 11 runs
R. Premadasa Stadium, Colombo
Umpires: Ian Gould (Eng) and Daryl Harper (Aus)
Player of the match: Shahid Afridi (Pak)

- Pakistan won the toss and elected to bat.

Pakistan captain Shahid Afridi won the toss and decided to bat first against Sri Lanka, one of the pre-tournament favorites. Sri Lanka got the wicket of Ahmed Shehzad in the sixth over, but Pakistan still managed to proceed along at a rapid run rate in the first ten overs. Mohammed Hafeez, Pakistan's other opener proceeded along at over a run a ball until a mix up with Kamran Akmal had him run out, and Kamran himself was stumped a few overs later to leave the match evenly poised at 105/3 in the 21st over. Younis Khan and Misbah-ul-Haq then built a 104 run partnership in 20 overs without taking too many risks, until Younis fell to Rangana Herath for 72 while trying to accelerate. Misbah stayed not out till the end for a well made 83, but Sri Lanka got the wickets of Umar Akmal and Abdul Razzaq cheaply, and Shahid Afridi before he did too much damage to the score to keep Pakistan to 277/7.

Sri Lanka started off with a very good reply, with their openers Upul Tharanga and Tillakaratne Dilshan accelerating steadily after a slow start to add 76 in just over 14 overs until Hafeez had Tharanga caught at point. This was the turning point of the match, as three more wickets, including that of Dilshan fell soon after to leave Sri Lanka tottering at 96/4. Kumar Sangakkara rode his luck with Kamran missing two stumpings off him, and staged a recovery with Chamara Silva, but his luck eventually ran out as the required run rate went up, with Afridi having him caught at long on one short of his fifty. Silva struggled to time the ball early in his innings, being 16 off 49 balls at one point, but he then accelerated rapidly to reach his half-century, but Afridi returned to remove dangerous looking Angelo Mathews. Silva eventually fell for 57 when Kamran did get a stumping right, and despite Nuwan Kulasekara's cameo, Sri Lanka ended up 11 short.

Pakistani all-rounder Shahid Afridi took his 300th ODI wicket during this match. The defeat was the first home loss for Sri Lanka in World Cup matches.

=== Zimbabwe vs Canada ===
28 February 2011
09:30
Scorecard

Zimbabwe; 298/9 (50 overs)	v	Canada; 123 (42.1 overs)
Tatenda Taibu 98 (99); Balaji Rao 4/57 (10 overs)		Zubin Surkari 26 (48); Ray Price 3/16 (8 overs)

Zimbabwe won by 175 runs
Vidarbha Cricket Association Stadium, Nagpur
Umpires: Asad Rauf (Pak) and Bruce Oxenford (Aus)
Player of the match: Tatenda Taibu (Zim)

- Zimbabwe won the toss and elected to bat.

Zimbabwe's victory was their fourth biggest by runs margin in ODI cricket, and their biggest in World Cups. Canadian opening batsman, Nitish Kumar, became the youngest ever player in World Cup cricket, aged 16 years and 283 days.

=== Sri Lanka vs Kenya ===
1 March 2011
14:30 (D/N)
Scorecard

Kenya; 142 (43.4 overs)	v	Sri Lanka; 146/1 (18.4 overs)
Collins Obuya 52 (100); Lasith Malinga 6/38 (7.4 overs)		Upul Tharanga 67* (59); Elijah Otieno 1/26 (4 overs)

Sri Lanka won by 9 wickets
R. Premadasa Stadium, Colombo
Umpires: Tony Hill (NZ) and Shavir Tarapore (Ind)
Player of the match: Lasith Malinga (SL)

- Kenya won the toss and elected to bat.

Sri Lankan fast bowler Lasith Malinga took a hat-trick, the second in his career. He became the first bowler to take two World Cup hat-tricks, and the fourth bowler to take two career ODI hat-tricks.

=== Canada vs Pakistan ===
3 March 2011
14:30 (D/N)
Scorecard

Pakistan; 184 (43 overs)	v	Canada; 138 (42.5 overs)
Umar Akmal 48 (68); Harvir Baidwan 3/35 (8 overs)		Jimmy Hansra 43 (75); Shahid Afridi 5/23 (10 overs)

Pakistan won by 46 runs
R. Premadasa Stadium, Colombo
Umpires: Daryl Harper (Aus) and Nigel Llong (Eng)
Player of the match: Shahid Afridi (Pak)

- Pakistan won the toss and elected to bat.

Shahid Afridi, who was named man of the match, set a new record of becoming the first player in World Cup matches to take four or more wickets in three consecutive games.

=== New Zealand vs Zimbabwe ===
4 March 2011
09:30
Scorecard

Zimbabwe; 162 (46.2 overs)	v	New Zealand; 166/0 (33.3 overs)
Brendan Taylor 44 (57); Tim Southee 3/29 (9.2 overs)		Martin Guptill 86* (108)

New Zealand won by 10 wickets
Sardar Patel Stadium, Ahmedabad
Umpires: Aleem Dar (Pak) and Marais Erasmus (SA)
Player of the match: Martin Guptill (NZ)

- Zimbabwe won the toss and elected to bat.

Martin Guptill and Brendon McCullum set a new record of the highest opening partnership for New Zealand in World Cup matches.

=== Sri Lanka vs Australia ===
5 March 2011
14:30 (D/N)
Scorecard

Sri Lanka; 146/3 (32.5 overs)	v	Australia
Kumar Sangakkara 73* (102); Shaun Tait 1/23 (5 overs)

No result
R. Premadasa Stadium, Colombo
Umpires: Ian Gould (Eng) and Tony Hill (NZ)

- Sri Lanka won the toss and elected to bat.
- Rain stopped play at 17:30 local time

The no-result ended Australia's World Cup winning streak at 25; Australia had won every World Cup game it had played since the tied semi-final against South Africa in the 1999 Cricket World Cup. Australia's unbeaten run in World Cup matches was not broken, and was extended to 32.

=== Kenya vs Canada ===
7 March 2011
14:30 (D/N)
Scorecard

Kenya; 198 (50 overs)	v	Canada; 199/5 (45.3 overs)
Thomas Odoyo 51 (62); Henry Osinde 4/26 (10 overs)		Jimmy Hansra 70 (99); Nehemiah Odhiambo 2/45 (10 overs)

Canada won by 5 wickets
Feroz Shah Kotla Stadium, Delhi
Umpires: Asad Rauf (Pak) and Billy Doctrove (WI)
Player of the match: Henry Osinde (Can)

- Kenya won the toss and elected to bat.

Canada's win was their third-successive victory against Kenya and their second win in World Cup matches. They had previously beaten Bangladesh in the 2003 Cricket World Cup.

=== New Zealand vs Pakistan ===
8 March 2011
14:30 (D/N)
Scorecard

New Zealand; 302/7 (50 overs)	v	Pakistan; 192 (41.1 overs)
Ross Taylor 131* (124); Umar Gul 3/32 (10 overs)		Abdul Razzaq 62 (74); Tim Southee 3/25 (8 overs)

New Zealand won by 110 runs.
Pallekele International Cricket Stadium, Kandy
Umpires: Daryl Harper (Aus) and Nigel Llong (Eng)
Player of the match: Ross Taylor (NZ)

- New Zealand won the toss and elected to bat.

New Zealand batted first, making a slow start. At the half-way point, they were 99/2, 163/4 at the 40 over mark and 210/6 by the 46th over. Ross Taylor and Jacob Oram then added 85 more runs from 22 balls. Taylor, playing on his birthday, finished unbeaten on 131 from 124 balls. He survived two early chances, edging a ball from Shoaib Akhtar before scoring. In the same over, he edged another one to Kamran Akmal which wasn't taken. New Zealand added 139 runs in the final ten overs, with 100 of them coming from the final five. Taylor scored 62 runs off the last 16 deliveries he faced, including seven sixes. In reply, Pakistan were bowled out for 192 from 41.1 overs. The match was the first ODI game to be played at the Pallekele International Cricket Stadium, Kandy. After the match, Taylor admitted that he'd played with a broken bat. "I cracked it in the nets a couple of days ago", he said. "It seemed to go OK today but hopefully the new one can be just as good."

=== Sri Lanka vs Zimbabwe ===
10 March 2011
14:30 (D/N)
Scorecard

Sri Lanka; 327/6 (50 overs)	v	Zimbabwe; 188 (39 overs)
Tillakaratne Dilshan 144 (131); Chris Mpofu 4/62 (7 overs)		Brendan Taylor 80 (72); Tillakaratne Dilshan 4/4 (3 overs)

Sri Lanka won by 139 runs
Pallekele International Cricket Stadium, Kandy
Umpires: Marais Erasmus (SA) and Nigel Llong (Eng)
Player of the match: Tillakaratne Dilshan (SL)

- Zimbabwe won the toss and elected to field.

Upul Tharanga and Tillakaratne Dilshan set a new World Cup record for the opening partnership, scoring 282 runs, beating the previous record of 194. It was also the first occasion in a World Cup that both openers made a century. With their victory over Zimbabwe, Sri Lanka became the first team to qualify for the Quarter Finals of the tournament. In reply, Zimbabwe made a good start, but were dismissed for 188 runs with 11 overs spare.

=== New Zealand vs Canada ===
13 March 2011
09:30
Scorecard

New Zealand; 358/6 (50 overs)	v	Canada; 261/9 (50 overs)
Brendon McCullum 101 (109); Harvir Baidwan 3/84 (9.1 overs)		Ashish Bagai 84 (87); Jacob Oram 3/47 (10 overs)

New Zealand won by 97 runs
Wankhede Stadium, Mumbai
Umpires: Bruce Oxenford (Aus) and Shavir Tarapore (Ind)
Player of the match: Brendon McCullum (NZ)

- Canada won the toss and elected to field.

=== Australia vs Kenya ===
13 March 2011
14:30 (D/N)
Scorecard

Australia; 324/6 (50 overs)	v	Kenya; 264/6 (50 overs)
Michael Clarke 93 (80); Nehemiah Odhiambo 3/57 (10 overs)		Collins Obuya 98* (129); Shaun Tait 2/49 (8 overs)

Australia won by 60 runs
M. Chinnaswamy Stadium, Bangalore
Umpires: Asad Rauf (Pak) and Richard Kettleborough (Eng)
Player of the match: Collins Obuya (Ken)

- Australia won the toss and elected to bat.

Kenya's total of 264 is their highest score in World Cup matches, beating their previous best of 254 against Sri Lanka in the 1996 Cricket World Cup.

=== Pakistan vs Zimbabwe ===
14 March 2011
14:30 (D/N)
Scorecard

Zimbabwe; 151/7 (39.4 overs)	v	Pakistan; 164/3 (34.1 overs)
Craig Ervine 52 (82); Umar Gul 3/36 (7.4 overs)		Asad Shafiq 78* (97); Ray Price 2/21 (8 overs)

Pakistan won by 7 wickets
Pallekele International Cricket Stadium, Kandy
Umpires: Tony Hill (NZ) and Nigel Llong (Eng)
Player of the match: Umar Gul (Pak)

- Zimbabwe won the toss and elected to bat.
- Rain reduced the game. Zimbabwe made 151/7 in 39.4 overs; so the target for Pakistan was 162 in 38 overs

=== Australia vs Canada ===
16 March 2011
14:30 (D/N)
Scorecard

Canada; 211 (45.4 overs)	v	Australia; 212/3 (34.5 overs)
Hiral Patel 54 (45); Brett Lee 4/46 (8.4 overs)		Shane Watson 94 (90); John Davison 1/29 (4 overs)

Australia won by 7 wickets
M. Chinnaswamy Stadium, Bangalore
Umpires: Billy Bowden (NZ) and Amiesh Saheba (Ind)
Player of the match: Shane Watson (Aus)

- Canada won the toss and elected to bat.

=== New Zealand vs Sri Lanka ===
18 March 2011
14:30 (D/N)
Scorecard

Sri Lanka; 265/9 (50 overs)	v	New Zealand; 153 (35 overs)
Kumar Sangakkara 111 (128); Tim Southee 3/63 (10 overs)		Ross Taylor 33 (55); Muttiah Muralitharan 4/25 (8 overs)

Sri Lanka won by 112 runs
Wankhede Stadium, Mumbai
Umpires: Asad Rauf (Pak) and Richard Kettleborough (Eng)
Player of the match: Kumar Sangakkara (SL)

- Sri Lanka won the toss and elected to bat.

=== Australia vs Pakistan ===
19 March 2011
14:30 (D/N)
Scorecard

Australia; 176 (46.4 overs)	v	Pakistan; 178/6 (41 overs)
Brad Haddin 42 (80); Umar Gul 3/30 (7.4 overs)		Asad Shafiq 46 (81); Brett Lee 4/28 (8 overs)

Pakistan won by 4 wickets
R. Premadasa Stadium, Colombo
Umpires: Marais Erasmus (SA) and Tony Hill (NZ)
Player of the match: Umar Akmal (Pak)

- Australia won the toss and elected to bat.

The loss was Australia's first loss in a World Cup match since 23 May 1999, when Pakistan defeated Australia at Headingley in the group stage of the 1999 World Cup. This ended a 34-match unbeaten streak (including 32 wins, a tie and a no-result).

=== Kenya vs Zimbabwe ===
20 March 2011
09:30
Scorecard

Zimbabwe; 308/6 (50 overs)	v	Kenya; 147 (36 overs)
Craig Ervine 66 (54); Elijah Otieno 2/61 (10 overs)		Nehemiah Odhiambo 44* (47); Ray Price 2/20 (7 overs)

Zimbabwe won by 161 runs
Eden Gardens, Kolkata
Umpires: Asoka de Silva (SL) and Kumar Dharmasena (SL)
Player of the match: Craig Ervine (Zim)

- Zimbabwe won the toss and elected to bat.
