= 2006 in men's road cycling =

== World Championships ==
The World Road Championships were held in Salzburg, Austria, from 21 to 28 September 2006.

Race	Date	Winner	Second	Third	Ref
World Championship Time Trial	September 21	Fabian Cancellara (SUI)	David Zabriskie (USA)	Alexander Vinokourov (KAZ)	
World Championship Road Race	September 24	Paolo Bettini (ITA)	Erik Zabel (GER)	Alejandro Valverde (ESP)	

== Grand Tours ==
Race	Date	Winner	Second	Third	Ref
(Italy) Giro d'Italia	May 6–28	Ivan Basso (ITA)	José Enrique Gutiérrez (ESP)	Gilberto Simoni (ITA)	
Tour de France	July 1–23	Óscar Pereiro (ESP)	Andreas Klöden (GER)	Carlos Sastre (ESP)	
(Spain) Vuelta a España	August 26 – September 17	Alexander Vinokourov (KAZ)	Alejandro Valverde (ESP)	Andrey Kashechkin (KAZ)	

== UCI Pro Tour ==
Race	Date	Winner	Second	Third	Ref
(France) Paris–Nice	March 5–12	Floyd Landis (USA)	Patxi Vila (ESP)	Antonio Colom (ESP)	
(Italy) Tirreno–Adriatico	March 8–14	Thomas Dekker (NED)	Jörg Jaksche (GER)	Alessandro Ballan (ITA)	
(Italy) Milan–San Remo	March 18	Filippo Pozzato (ITA)	Alessandro Petacchi (ITA)	Luca Paolini (ITA)	
(Belgium) Tour of Flanders	April 2	Tom Boonen (BEL)	Leif Hoste (BEL)	George Hincapie (USA)	
(Spain) Tour of the Basque Country	April 3–8	José Ángel Gómez Marchante (ESP)	Alejandro Valverde (ESP)	Antonio Colom (ESP)	
(Belgium) Gent–Wevelgem	April 5	Thor Hushovd (NOR)	David Kopp (GER)	Alessandro Petacchi (ITA)	
(France) Paris–Roubaix	April 9	Fabian Cancellara (SUI)	Tom Boonen (BEL)	Alessandro Ballan (ITA)	
(Netherlands) Amstel Gold Race	April 16	Fränk Schleck (LUX)	Steffen Wesemann (SUI)	Michael Boogerd (NED)	
(Belgium) La Flèche Wallonne	April 19	Alejandro Valverde (ESP)	Samuel Sánchez (ESP)	Karsten Kroon (NED)	
(Belgium) Liège–Bastogne–Liège	April 23	Alejandro Valverde (ESP)	Paolo Bettini (ITA)	Damiano Cunego (ITA)	
(Switzerland) Tour de Romandie	April 25–30	Cadel Evans (AUS)	Alberto Contador (ESP)	Alejandro Valverde (ESP)	
(Italy) Giro d'Italia	May 6–28	Ivan Basso (ITA)	José Enrique Gutiérrez (ESP)	Gilberto Simoni (ITA)	
(Spain) Volta a Catalunya	May 15–21	David Cañada (ESP)	Santiago Botero (COL)	Christophe Moreau (FRA)	
(France) Critérium du Dauphiné Libéré	June 4–11	Levi Leipheimer (USA)	Christophe Moreau (FRA)	Bernhard Kohl (AUT)	
(Switzerland) Tour de Suisse	June 10–18	Jan Ullrich (GER)	Koldo Gil (ESP)	Jörg Jaksche (GER)	
Tour de France	July 1–23	Óscar Pereiro (ESP)	Andreas Klöden (GER)	Carlos Sastre (ESP)	
(Netherlands) Eindhoven Team Time Trial	June 18	Team CSC	Discovery Channel	Gerolsteiner	
(Germany) Vattenfall Cyclassics	July 30	Óscar Freire (ESP)	Erik Zabel (GER)	Filippo Pozzato (ITA)	
(Germany) Deutschland Tour	August 1–9	Jens Voigt (GER)	Levi Leipheimer (USA)	Andrey Kashechkin (KAZ)	
(Spain) Clásica de San Sebastián	August 12	Xavier Florencio (ESP)	Stefano Garzelli (ITA)	Andrey Kashechkin (KAZ)	
(Belgium) (Netherlands) Eneco Tour	August 16–23	Stefan Schumacher (GER)	George Hincapie (USA)	Vincenzo Nibali (ITA)	
(Spain) Vuelta a España	August 26 – September 17	Alexander Vinokourov (KAZ)	Alejandro Valverde (ESP)	Andrey Kashechkin (KAZ)	
GP Ouest-France	August 27	Vincenzo Nibali (ITA)	Juan Antonio Flecha (ESP)	Manuele Mori (ITA)	
(Poland) Tour de Pologne	September 4–10	Stefan Schumacher (GER)	Cadel Evans (AUS)	Alessandro Ballan (ITA)	
(Switzerland) Züri-Metzgete	October 1	Samuel Sánchez (ESP)	Stuart O'Grady (AUS)	Davide Rebellin (ITA)	
(France) Paris–Tours	October 8	Frédéric Guesdon (FRA)	Kurt Asle Arvesen (NOR)	Stuart O'Grady (AUS)	
(Italy) Giro di Lombardia	October 14	Paolo Bettini (ITA)	Samuel Sánchez (ESP)	Fabian Wegmann (GER)	

== 2.HC Category Races ==
Race	Date	Winner	Second	Third	Ref
(Australia) Tour Down Under	January 17–22	Simon Gerrans (AUS)	Luis León Sánchez (ESP)	Robbie McEwen (AUS)	
(Malaysia) Tour de Langkawi	February 3–12	David George (RSA)	Francesco Bellotti (ITA)	Gabriele Missaglia (ITA)	
(France) Critérium International	March 25–26	Ivan Basso (ITA)	Erik Dekker (NED)	Andriy Hrivko (UKR)	
(Belgium) Three Days of De Panne	March 28–30	Leif Hoste (BEL)	Bernhard Eisel (AUT)	Luis León Sánchez (ESP)	
(United States) Tour de Georgia	April 18–23	Floyd Landis (USA)	Tom Danielson (USA)	Yaroslav Popovych (UKR)	
(France) Four Days of Dunkirk	May 3–7	Roberto Petito (ITA)	Stéphane Pétilleau (FRA)	Didier Rous (FRA)	
(Czech Republic) Course de la Paix	May 13–20	Giampaolo Cheula (ITA)	Andrea Tonti (ITA)	Cristian Gasperoni (ITA)	
(Germany) Bayern Rundfahrt	May 24–28	José Alberto Martínez (ESP)	Beat Zberg (SUI)	Luke Roberts (AUS)	
Tour de Luxembourg	May 31 – June 4	Christian Vande Velde (USA)	Tomasz Brożyna (POL)	Allan Johansen (DEN)	
(Spain) Euskal Bizikleta	May 31 – June 4	Koldo Gil (ESP)	David Herrero (ESP)	Jesús Del Nero (ESP)	
Tour of Austria	July 3–9	Tom Danielson (USA)	Ruslan Pidgornyy (UKR)	Christian Pfannberger (AUT)	
(China) Tour of Qinghai Lake	July 15–23	Maarten Tjallingii (NED)	Hossein Askari (IRI)	Nácor Burgos (ESP)	
(Belgium) Tour de Wallonie	July 24–28	Fabrizio Guidi (ITA)	Nico Sijmens (BEL)	Kurt Asle Arvesen (NOR)	
(Denmark) Danmark Rundt	August 2–6	Fabian Cancellara (SUI)	Stuart O'Grady (AUS)	Thomas Ziegler (GER)	
Volta a Portugal	August 5–15	David Blanco (ESP)	Héctor Guerra (ESP)	Cândido Barbosa (POR)	
(Spain) Vuelta a Burgos	August 6–10	Iban Mayo (ESP)	José Antonio Pecharromán (ESP)	Daniel Moreno (ESP)	

== 1.HC Category Races ==
Race	Date	Winner	Second	Third	Ref
(Belgium) Omloop Het Volk	February 25	Philippe Gilbert (BEL)	Bert De Waele (BEL)	Léon van Bon (NED)	
(Italy) Milano–Torino	March 4	Igor Astarloa (ESP)	Franco Pellizotti (ITA)	Mirko Celestino (ITA)	
(Belgium) E3 Harelbeke	March 25	Tom Boonen (BEL)	Alessandro Ballan (ITA)	Aart Vierhouten (NED)	
(Belgium) Scheldeprijs	April 12	Tom Boonen (BEL)	Steven de Jongh (NED)	Gert Steegmans (BEL)	
(Germany) Rund um den Henninger Turm	May 1	Stefano Garzelli (ITA)	Gerald Ciolek (GER)	Danilo Hondo (GER)	
(Switzerland) GP du canton d'Argovie	June 4	Beat Zberg (SUI)	Nick Nuyens (BEL)	Grégory Rast (SUI)	
(Netherlands) Veenendaal–Veenendaal	June 7	Tom Boonen (BEL)	Steffen Radochla (GER)	Max van Heeswijk (NED)	
(United States) Wachovia Cycling Series-Philadelphia	June 11	Greg Henderson (NZL)	Iván Domínguez (CUB)	Oleg Grishkine (RUS)	
(Italy) Giro del Lazio	August 5	Giuliano Figueras (ITA)	Damiano Cunego (ITA)	Emanuele Sella (ITA)	
(Italy) Tre Valli Varesine	August 15	Stefano Garzelli (ITA)	Rinaldo Nocentini (ITA)	Raffaele Ferrara (ITA)	
(Italy) Giro del Veneto	August 26	Rinaldo Nocentini (ITA)	Raffaele Ferrara (ITA)	Sergio Marinangeli (ITA)	
(Italy) Coppa Placci	September 2	Rinaldo Nocentini (ITA)	Emanuele Sella (ITA)	Raffaele Ferrara (ITA)	
(Belgium) Paris–Bruxelles	September 9	Robbie McEwen (AUS)	Tom Boonen (BEL)	Steven de Jongh (NED)	
(France) Grand Prix de Fourmies	September 10	Philippe Gilbert (BEL)	Adrián Palomares (ESP)	Michael Albasini (SUI)	
(Italy) Giro dell'Emilia	October 7	Davide Rebellin (ITA)	Danilo Di Luca (ITA)	Giuseppe Di Grande (ITA)	
(Italy) Giro del Piemonte	October 12	Daniele Bennati (ITA)	Grégory Rast (SUI)	Gene Bates (AUS)	

== UCI tours ==
Tour	Individual champion	Individual champion's team	Team champion	Nations champion
Pro Tour	Alejandro Valverde (ESP)	Caisse d'Epargne–Illes Balears	Team CSC	Spain
UCI Africa Tour	Rabaki Jérémie Ouédraogo (BUR)		Cycling Team Capec	South Africa
UCI America Tour	José Serpa (COL)	Selle Italia–Diquigiovanni	Selle Italia–Diquigiovanni	Colombia
UCI Asia Tour	Ghader Mizbani (IRI)	Giant Asia Racing Team	Giant Asia Racing Team	Iran
UCI Europe Tour	Niko Eeckhout (BEL)	Chocolade Jacques–Topsport Vlaanderen	Acqua & Sapone	Italy
UCI Oceania Tour	Gordon McCauley (NZL)	Successfulliving.com-Parkpre	Successfulliving.com-Parkpre	Australia

== Continental Championships ==
=== African Championships ===
Race	Date	Winner	Second	Third
Road race	December 9, 2005	Rupert Rheeder (RSA)	Thomas Desvaux De Marigny (MRI)	Mohamed Abdel Aziz Wahab (EGY)
Individual time trial	December 6, 2005	Alexander Pavlov (RSA)	Rafaâ Chtioui (TUN)	Rupert Rheeder (RSA)

=== Asian Championships ===
Race	Date	Winner	Second	Third
Road race	September 16	Mehdi Sohrabi (IRI)	Shinichi Fukushima (JPN)	Omar Hasanin (SYR)
Individual time trial	September 14	Andrey Mizurov (KAZ)	Ghader Mizbani (IRI)	Makoto Iijima (JPN)

=== European Championships (under-23) ===
Race	Date	Winner	Second	Third
Road race	July 16	Benoît Sinner (FRA)	René Mandri (EST)	Francesco Gavazzi (ITA)
Individual time trial	July 14	Dmytro Grabovskyy (UKR)	Jérôme Coppel (FRA)	Dominique Cornu (BEL)

=== Oceania Championships ===
Race	Date	Winner	Second	Third
Road race	December 4, 2005	Gordon McCauley (NZL)	Phillip Thuaux (AUS)	Geoffrey Burndred (NZL)
Individual time trial	December 3, 2005	Gordon McCauley (NZL)	Robin Reid (NZL)	Aaron Strong (NZL)

=== Pan American Championships ===
Race	Date	Winner	Second	Third	Ref
Road race	June 4	José Serpa (COL)	Breno Sidoti (BRA)	Alex Diniz (BRA)	
Individual time trial	June 6	Pedro Nicacio (BRA)	Magno Nazaret (BRA)	Eric Wohlberg (CAN)	

== International Games ==
=== Asian Games ===
Race	Winner	Second	Third
Road race	Wong Kam-po (HKG)	Mehdi Sohrabi (IRI)	Park Sung-Baek (KOR)
Time trial	Song Baoqing (CHN)	Eugen Wacker (KGZ)	Andrey Mizurov (KAZ)

=== Central American and Caribbean Games ===
Race	Winner	Second	Third
Road race	Fausto Esparza (MEX)	Jhon García (COL)	Artur García (VEN)
Time trial	José Serpa (COL)	José Chacón Díaz (VEN)	Tomás Gil (VEN)

=== Commonwealth Games ===
Race	Winner	Second	Third
Road race	Mathew Hayman (AUS)	David George (RSA)	Allan Davis (AUS)
Time trial	Nathan O'Neill (AUS)	Ben Day (AUS)	Gordon McCauley (NZL)

=== South American Games ===
Race	Winner	Second	Third	Ref
Road race	Alejandro Borrajo (ARG)	Francisco Cabrera (CHI)	Artur García (VEN)	
Time trial	Matías Médici (ARG)	Libardo Niño (COL)	José Medina (CHI)	

=== South Asian Games ===
Race	Winner	Second	Third
Road race	Meemanage Perera (SRI)	Lokuye Upul (SRI)	Ali Dilsher (PAK)
Time trial	Meemanage Perera (SRI)	Dinesh Thusitha (SRI)	Kumara Mhemantha (SRI)

== See also ==
- 2006 in women's road cycling
