= 2006 Danmark Rundt =

(Denmark) 2006 Danmark Rundt
Race details
- Dates: 2–6 August 2006
- Stages: 6
- Distance: 874 km (543 mi)
- Winning time: 19h 49' 14"

Results
| Jersey awarded to the overall winner | Winner | Fabian Cancellara (SUI) | (Team CSC) |
| | Second | Stuart O'Grady (AUS) | (Team CSC) |
| | Third | Thomas Ziegler (GER) | (T-Mobile Team) |
| Jersey awarded to the points classification winner | Points | Stuart O'Grady (AUS) | (Team CSC) |
| Jersey awarded to the mountains classification winner | Mountains | Aart Vierhouten (NED) | (Skil–Shimano) |
| Jersey awarded to the young rider classification winner | Young rider | Fabian Cancellara (SUI) | (Team CSC) |
| Jersey awarded to the sprints classification winner | Sprints | Jacob Nielsen (DEN) | (Glud & Marstrand–Horsens) |
| | Team | (Denmark) Team CSC | |

The 2006 Danmark Rundt was a men's road bicycle race held from 2 to 6 August 2006. Swiss rider Fabian Cancellara of Team CSC captured the overall title. It was the 16th edition of the men's stage race, which was established in 1985.

== Stages ==
=== Stage 1: Frederikshavn–Viborg, Denmark (210 km) ===
The 2006 Danmark Rundt started in Frederikshavn and the first stage took the riders across Vendsyssel before turning south towards Viborg. This was also the race's longest stage.

Route: Frederikshavn–Hjørring–Løkken–Brovst–Løgstør–Farsø–Gedsted–Skals–Viborg, ending with 2 laps of 4.5 km.

==== Results ====
| # | Rider | Team | Time |
|---|---|---|---|
| 1 | (Spain) Aitor Galdos Alonso | Panaria Navigare | 4h44'08" |
| 2 | (Austria) René Haselbacher | Gerolsteiner | s.t. |
| 3 | (Australia) Stuart O'Grady | Team CSC | s.t. |
| 4 | (Italy) Manuel Quinziato | Liquigas–Bianchi | at 10" |
| 5 | (Argentina) Maximiliano Richeze | Panaria Navigare | at 18" |
Full result

This meant that Aitor Galos Alonso lead the general classification, as well as the point classification. Aart Vierhouten lead the hill competition, Alex Rasmussen held the youth jersey, Jacob Nielsen the fighter jersey and Gerolsteiner lead the team competition.

=== Stage 2: Aalestrup–Vejle (185 km) ===
Stage 2 took the riders south through Jutland, reaching the race's highest point some 170 metres above sea level at Yding Skovhøj. The stage also featured a rough 21% climb on Kiddesvej in Vejle which was included on both of the final laps.

Route: Aalestrup–Møldrup–Viborg–Dollerup Bakker–Kjellerup–Silkeborg–Gl. Rye–Yding Skovhøj–Uldum–Vejle, ending with 2 laps of 5.5 km.

==== Results ====
| # | Rider | Team | Time |
|---|---|---|---|
| 1 | (Switzerland) Fabian Cancellara | Team CSC | 4h16'34" |
| 2 | (Australia) Stuart O'Grady | Team CSC | at 21" |
| 3 | (Germany) Thomas Ziegler | Team T-Mobile | s.t. |
| 4 | (Australia) Cadel Evans | Davitamon–Lotto | at 23" |
| 5 | (Australia) Baden Cooke | Unibet.com Cycling Team | s.t. |
Full result

This means that Fabian Cancellara moved into yellow and took the white youth-jersey too, although Aitor Galdos Alonso retained the dark-purple point-jersey. Aart Vierhouten kept the dotted hill-jersey, and Maarten Tjallingi took the fighter-jersey. Team CSC moved into first in the team classification.

=== Stage 3: Kolding–Odense (205 km) ===
The third stage reached the Little Belt Bridge before following the western and south coast of Funen until Svendborg, then heading north to the island's largest city, Odense.

Route: Kolding–Middelfart–Assens–Hårby–Faaborg–Svendborg–Ringe–Odense, ending with 2 laps of 4.4 km.

==== Results ====
| # | Rider | Team | Time |
|---|---|---|---|
| 1 | (Germany) Robert Förster | Gerolsteiner | 4h40'41" |
| 2 | (Australia) Stuart O'Grady | Team CSC | s.t. |
| 3 | (Denmark) Alex Rasmussen | Team Post Danmark | s.t. |
| 4 | (Netherlands) Aart Vierhouten | Skil–Shimano | s.t. |
| 5 | (Argentina) Maximiliano Richeze | Panaria Navigare | s.t. |
Full result

After stage 3, Stuart O'Grady held the yellow and purple jerseys. Aart Vierhouten kept the dotted jersey, and Fabian Cancellara was still the best youngster. Jacob Nielsen took the fighter jersey, and Team CSC was still on top of the team-leaderboard.

=== Stage 4: Sorø–Hillerød (100 km) ===
Stage 4 was a so-called "half-stage", with an individual time trial being held in the evening of 5 August. The stage went north-east from Sorø through Tølløse, birth city of 2005 and 2006 Tour de France polka-dot winner Michael Rasmussen, on its way to Hillerød.

Route: Sorø–Stenlille–Tølløse–Kirke Hyllinge–Skibby–Frederikssund–Slangerup–Hillerød, ending with 2 laps of 4.0 km.

==== Results ====
| # | Rider | Team | Time |
|---|---|---|---|
| 1 | (Germany) Olaf Pollack | T-Mobile Team | 2h30'04" |
| 2 | (Australia) Baden Cooke | Unibet.com Cycling Team | s.t. |
| 3 | (Australia) Stuart O'Grady | Team CSC | s.t. |
| 4 | (Austria) René Haselbacher | Gerolsteiner | s.t. |
| 5 | (Poland) Dariusz Rudnicki | Team Intel Action | s.t. |
Full result

No classements got new leaders in this short stage, leaving O'Grady leading the individual classification and CSC the team classification.

=== Stage 5: Elsinore (14 km, ITT) ===
Stage 5, the penultimate stage, was a short individual time trial. A few days before this stage, it was shortened from 15.5 to 14 km. The stage took place on the same day as stage 4.

Route (streets are unlinked): Kronborgvej–Ndr. Strandvej–Hellebæk–Ålsgårde (turning point)–Hellebæk–Elsinore–Kronborgvej

==== Results ====
| # | Rider | Team | Time |
|---|---|---|---|
| 1 | (Switzerland) Fabian Cancellara | Team CSC | 0h16'15" |
| 2 | (Germany) Thomas Ziegler | Team T-Mobile | at 18" |
| 3 | (Denmark) Alex Rasmussen | Team Post Danmark | at 24" |
| 4 | (Italy) Vincenzo Nibali | Liquigas–Bianchi | at 27" |
| 5 | (Australia) Stuart O'Grady | Team CSC | at 27" |
Full result

=== Stage 6: Gilleleje–Frederiksberg (156 km) ===
The final stage crossed Benbrækkeren, a steep hill in northern Zealand, before ending with the traditional finish at Frederiksberg Allé.

Route: Gilleleje–"Benbrækkeren"–Helsinge–Hillerød–Blovstrød–Vedbæk–Frederiksberg, ending with 10 laps of 6.0 km.

- Stage winner: Robert Förster

== Participation list ==
The peloton consisted of 125 riders on 16 teams (7–8 per team). This is the list of the participants, as seen on the official site.

| Team | Riders |
ProTour teams
| (Denmark) Team CSC | Stuart O'Grady, Brian Vandborg, Fabian Cancellara, Jakob Piil, Kurt Asle Arvesen, Allan Johansen, Lars Bak and Matti Breschel |
| (Germany) T-Mobile Team | Olaf Pollack, Scott Davis, Bas Giling, Sergey Ivanov, Berhard Kohl, André Korff, Eric Baumann and Thomas Ziegler |
| (Italy) Liquigas–Bianchi | Magnus Bäckstedt, Alberto Curtolo, Mauro Da Dalto, Nicola Loda, Vincenzo Nibali, Manuel Quinziato and Marco Righetto |
| (Belgium) Davitamon–Lotto | Cadel Evans, Olivier Kaisen, Bert Roesems, Tom Steels, Preben Van Hecke, Léon van Bon, Peter Van Petegem and Fred Rodriguez |
| (Germany) Gerolsteiner | Frank Høj, Robert Förster, Thomas Fothen, René Haselbacher, Volker Ordowski, Sven Krauss, Matthias Russ and Michael Rich |
UCI Professional Continental teams
| (Belgium) Unibet.com Cycling Team | Baden Cooke, Glenn Bak, Gorik Gardeyn, Jeremy Hunt, Geert Omloop, Bobbie Traksel, Matthew Wilson and Marco Zanotti |
| (Italy) Panaria Navigare | Paride Grillo, Brett Lancaster, Ariel Maximiliano Richeze, Moisés Aldape Chávez, Mirko Allegrini, Matteo Priamo, Tiziano Dall'Antonia and Aitor Galdos Alonso |
| (United Kingdom) Team Barloworld | Igor Astarloa, Giosuè Bonomi, Diego Caccia, Enrico Degano, Mauro Facci, Rodney Green, Jeremy Maartens and James Perry |
| (Belgium) Chocolade Jacques – Topsport Vlaanderen | Glenn D'Hollander, Kenny Lisabeth, Kenny Dehaes, Frederik Willems, Iljo Keisse, Bart Vanheule, Wouter Van Mechelen and Koen Barbe |
| (Poland) Team Intel Action | Marcin Osinski, Dariusz Rudnicki, Krzysztof Miara, Krzysztof Kuznmiak, Denys Kostyuk, Bogdan Bondrev and Łukasz Bodnar |
| (Switzerland) Team LPR | Samuele Marzoli, Andreas Dietziker, Mikhaylo Khalilov, Yuri Metlushenko, Alessandro Maserati, Roberto Traficante and Gene Michael Bates |
| (Netherlands) Skil–Shimano | Aart Vierhouten, Rik Reinerink, Piet Rooyakkers, Maarten Tjallingi, Paul Martens, René Weissinger, Kenny van Hummel and Christoph Messchenmoser |
Continental teams
| (Denmark) Team GLS | Jacob Moe Rasmussen, Jimmy Hansen, Kristoffer G. Nielsen, Michael Mørkøv, Kasper Jebjerg, Anders Lund, Lasse Bøchmann and Jonas Aaen Jørgensen |
| (Denmark) Team Designa Køkken | Rene Jørgensen, Michael Reihs, Michael Larsen, Chris Anker Sørensen, Daniel Holm Foder, Jakob Fuglsang, Allan Bo Andresen and Jens-Erik Madsen |
| (Denmark) Glud & Marstrand–Horsens | Michael Skelde, Morten Christiansen, Jacob Nielsen, Troels Vinther, André Steensen, Roy Hegreberg, Rune Udby and Michael Berling |
National teams
| (Denmark) Team Post Danmark* | Alex Rasmussen, Casper Jørgensen, Martin Mortensen, Peter Riis Andersen, Michael Tronborg, Jacob Kodrup, Nikola Aistrup and Jan Almblad |

*Team Post Danmark is a team of Danish riders, whose teams don't enter the race. Post Danmark is sponsor for the national team, so therefore the team is registered as a national one.
