= Rainbow jersey =

Colored jersey for the reigning World Champion in cycling

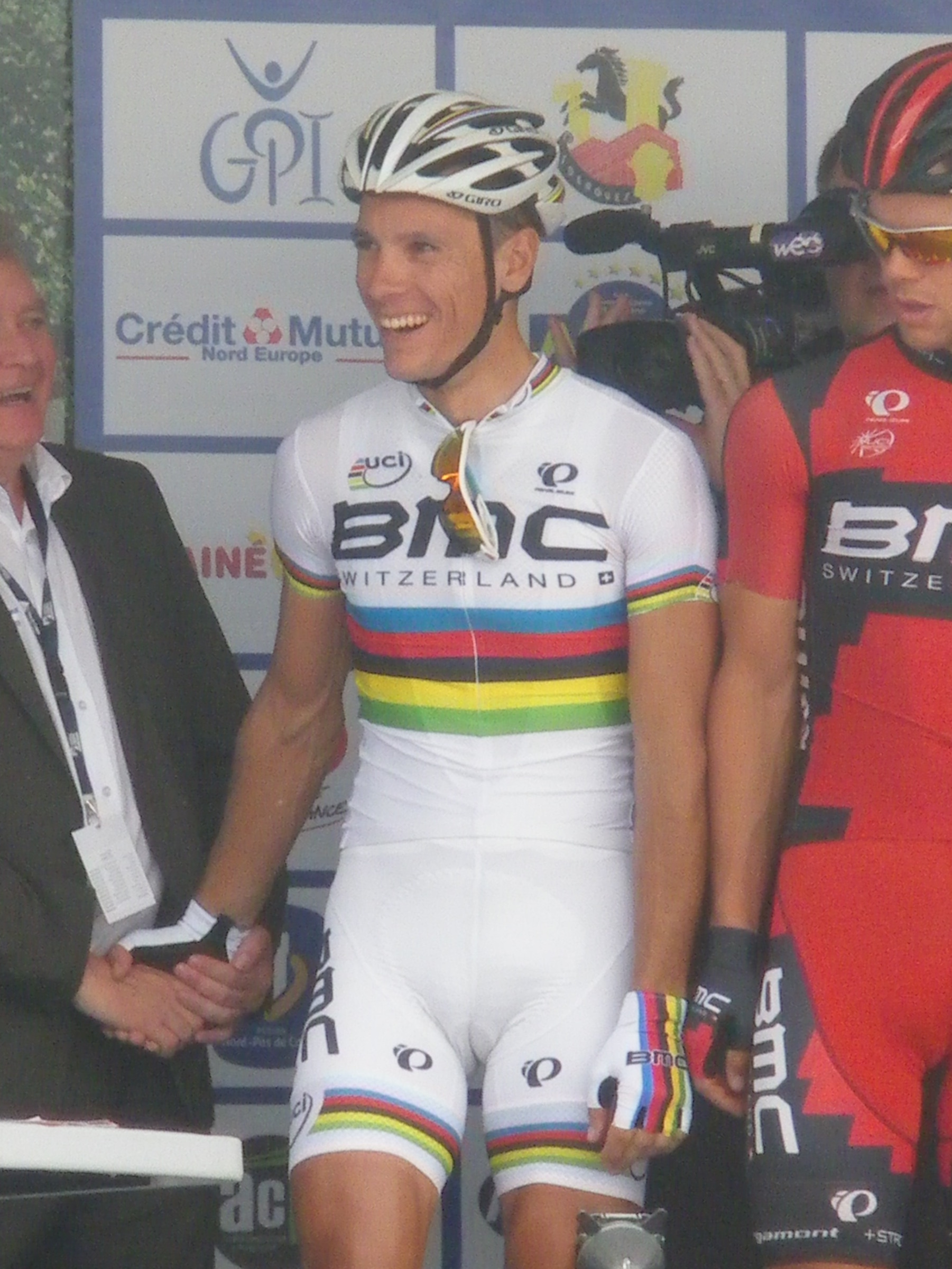
The 2012 world road race champion Philippe Gilbert wearing the rainbow jersey.

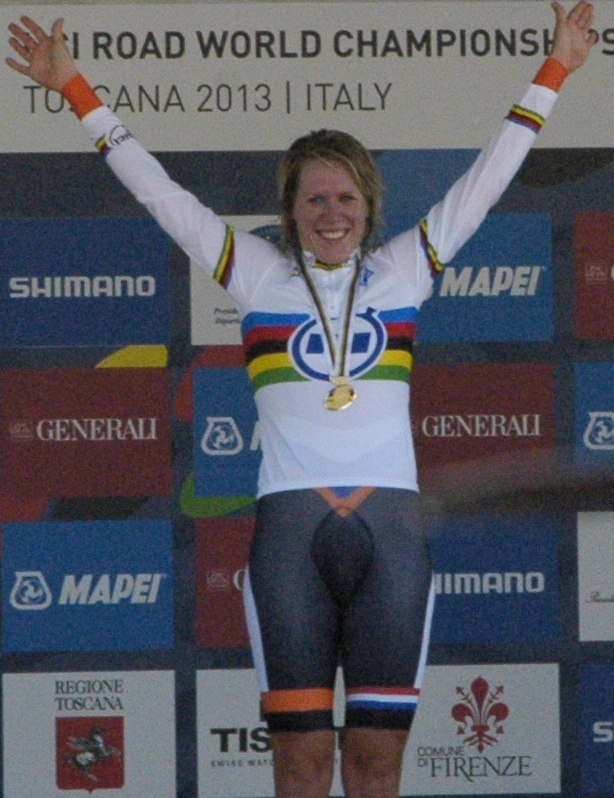
The 2013 world time trial champion Ellen van Dijk wearing the time trial rainbow jersey

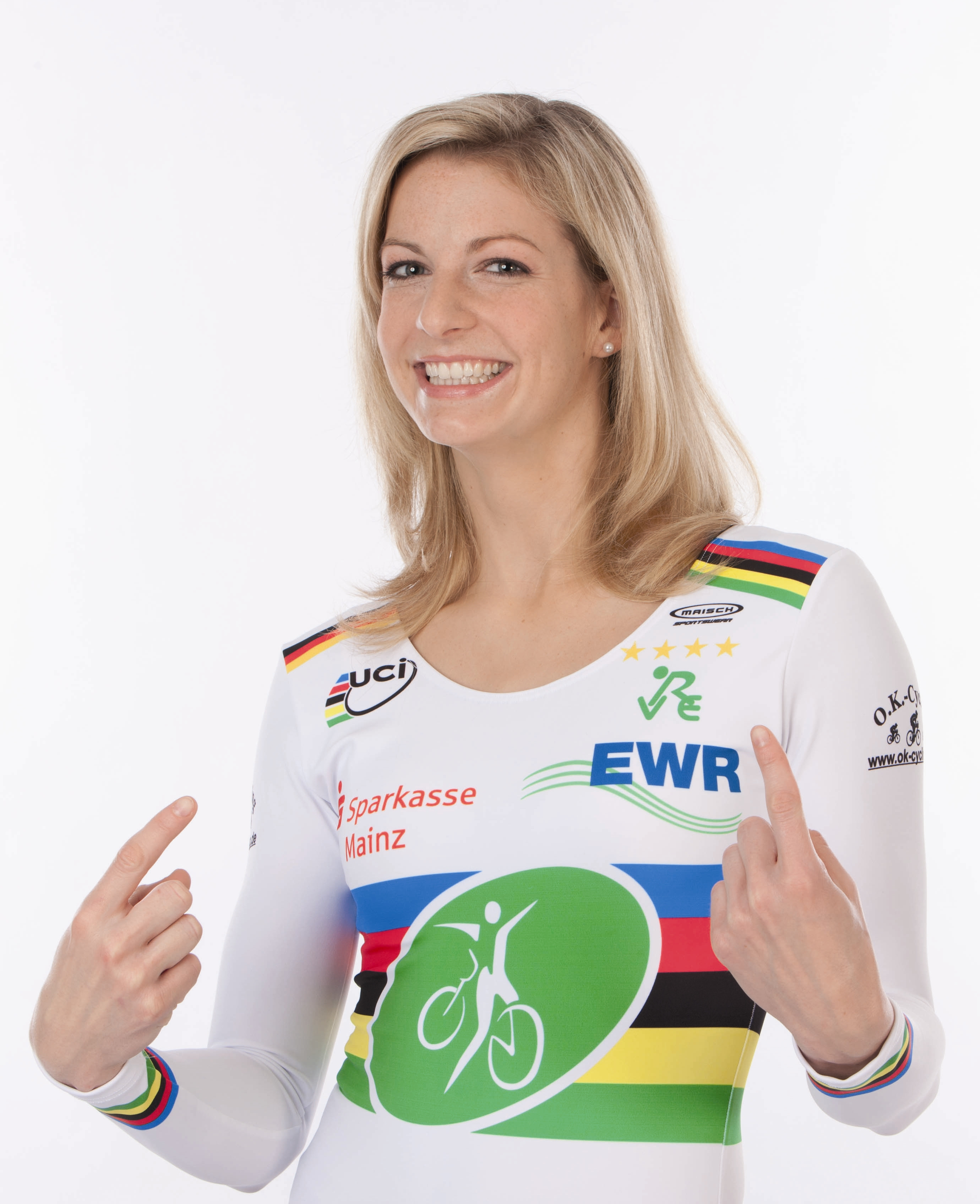
Katrin Schultheis wearing the rainbow jersey for artistic cycling

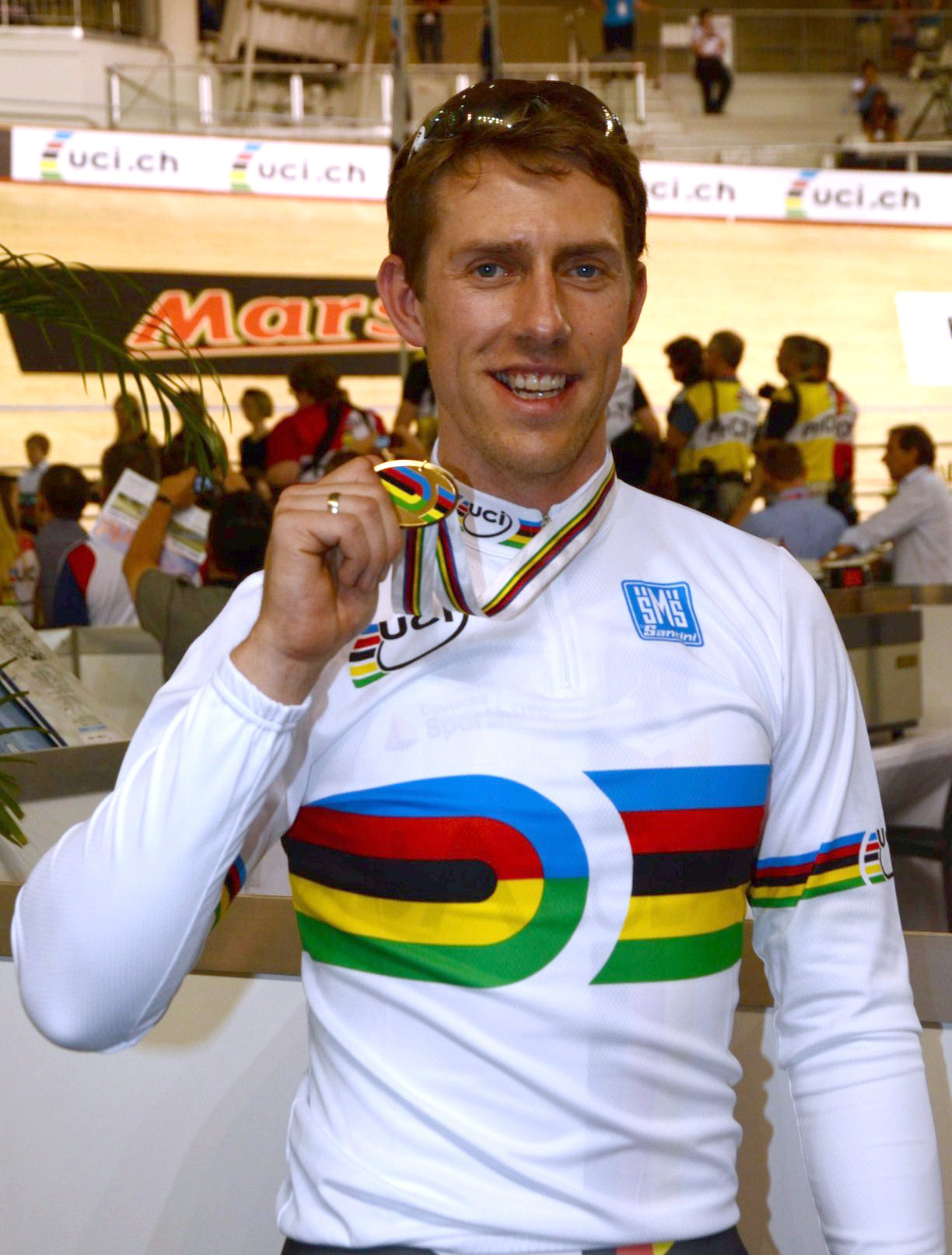
Stefan Nimke, 2012 men's 1 km time trial world champion wearing the track rainbow jersey

The rainbow jersey is the distinctive jersey worn by the reigning world champion in a cycling discipline, since 1927. The jersey is predominantly white with five horizontal bands in the UCI colours around the chest. From the bottom up the colours are: green, yellow, black, red and blue; the same colours that appear in the rings on the Olympic flag. The tradition is applied to all disciplines, including road racing, track racing, cyclo-cross, BMX, Trials and the disciplines within mountain biking. A world champion must wear the jersey when competing in the same discipline, category and specialty for which the title was won. For example, the world road race champion would wear the garment while competing in stage races and one-day races, but would not be entitled to wear it during time trials, whether one-off events or as part of stage races. Similarly, on the track, the world individual pursuit champion would only wear the jersey when competing in other individual pursuit events. Reigning individual time trial champions are authorized to wear the jersey in both individual and team time trial events (the latter of which does not have a UCI championship event). In team events, such as the team pursuit, each member of the team must wear the rainbow jersey, but would not wear it while racing in, say, points races or other track disciplines. If the holder of a rainbow jersey becomes leader of a stage race or a category within it, that leadership jersey takes precedence. Also, the rainbow piping may not be worn on national team clothing, even by reigning world champions. Failure to wear the rainbow jersey where required carries a penalty of a fine.

After the end of a rider's time as champion, they are eligible to wear piping in the same rainbow pattern on the collar and cuffs of their jersey for the remainder of their career, but only while competing in the same discipline, category and specialty for which the title was won.

== Reigning world champions ==
The reigning world champions (elite only) are as follows:

Discipline	Event	World Champion Men	World Champion Women	Next Championships
Road	Road race	Brandon McNulty (USA)	Demi Vollering (NED)	August 2027
Road	Time trial	Remco Evenepoel (BEL)	Marlen Reusser (SUI)	August 2027
Road	Mixed relay	Australia; Michael Matthews; Ben O'Connor; Jay Vine; Grace Brown; Brodie Chapman; Ruby Roseman-Gannon		August 2027
Track	Sprint	Harrie Lavreysen (NED)	Emma Finucane (GBR)	October 2024
Track	Team sprint	Netherlands; Roy van den Berg; Harrie Lavreysen; Jeffrey Hoogland	Germany; Pauline Grabosch; Emma Hinze; Lea Friedrich	October 2024
Track	Time trial	Jeffrey Hoogland (NED)	Emma Hinze (GER)	October 2024
Track	Keirin	Kevin Quintero (COL)	Ellesse Andrews (NZL)	October 2024
Track	Individual pursuit	Filippo Ganna (ITA)	Chloé Dygert (USA)	October 2024
Track	Team pursuit	Denmark; Niklas Larsen; Carl-Frederik Bévort; Lasse Norman Leth; Rasmus Pedersen; Frederik Rodenberg	Great Britain; Katie Archibald; Elinor Barker; Josie Knight; Anna Morris; Megan Barker	October 2024
Track	Scratch race	William Tidball (GBR)	Jennifer Valente (USA)	October 2024
Track	Points race	Aaron Gate (NZL)	Lotte Kopecky (BEL)	October 2024
Track	Elimination race	Ethan Vernon (GBR)	Lotte Kopecky (BEL)	October 2024
Track	Madison	Germany; Roger Kluge; Tim Torn Teutenberg	Denmark; Amalie Dideriksen; Julie Norman Leth	October 2024
Track	Omnium	Iúri Leitão (POR)	Jennifer Valente (USA)	October 2024
Cyclo-cross	Elite	Mathieu van der Poel (NED)	Fem van Empel (NED)	January 2024
Mountain bike	Cross-country Olympic	Tom Pidcock (GBR)	Pauline Ferrand-Prévot (FRA)	August/September 2024
Mountain bike	Cross-country short track	Sam Gaze (NZL)	Pauline Ferrand-Prévot (FRA)	August/September 2024
Mountain bike	E-MTB Cross-country	Joris Ryf (SUI)	Nathalie Schneitter (SUI)	August/September 2024
Mountain bike	Cross-country relay	Switzerland; Dario Lillo; Nicolas Halter; Linda Indergand; Ronja Blöchlinger; Anina Hutter; Nino Schurter		August/September 2024
Mountain bike	Downhill	Jackson Goldstone (CAN)	Valentina Höll (AUT)	August/September 2024
Mountain bike	Cross-country eliminator	Jeroen van Eck (NED)	Gaia Tormena (ITA)	TBD 2025
Mountain bike	Four-cross	Tomáš Slavík (CZE)	Michaela Hájková (CZE)	TBD
Mountain bike	Marathon	Henrique Avancini (BRA)	Mona Mitterwallner (AUT)	September 2024
Mountain bike	Pump track	Niels Bensink (NED)	Christa von Niederhäusern (SUI)	November 2024
BMX racing	Elite	Romain Mahieu (FRA)	Beth Shriever (GBR)	May 2024
Urban	BMX freestyle park	Kieran Reilly (GBR)	Hannah Roberts (USA)	2024
Urban	BMX freestyle flatland	Yu Shoji (JPN)	Aude Cassagne (FRA)	2024
Urban	20 inch trials	Alejandro Montalvo (ESP)	Not applicable	2024
Urban	26 inch trials	Jack Carthy (GBR)	Not applicable	2024
Urban	Open trials	Not applicable	Nina Reichenbach (GER)	2024
Urban	Mixed team	Spain; Borja Conejos; Daniel Barón; Daniel Cegarra; Víctor Pérez; Vera Barón		2024
Artistic	Single	Lukas Kohl (GER)	Ramona Dandl (GER)	TBD
Artistic	Open four	Switzerland; Stefanie Moos; Vanessa Hotz; Flavia Schürmann; Carole Ledergerber		TBD
Artistic	Pairs	Not applicable	Germany; Selina Marquardt; Helen Vordermeier	TBD
Artistic	Open pairs	Germany; Serafin Schefold; Max Hanselmann		TBD
Artistic	Cycle ball	Germany; André Kopp; Raphael Kopp	Germany; Claire Feyler; Nadine Jacqueline Weber	TBD
Gravel	Elite	Florian Vermeersch (BEL)	Lorena Wiebes (NED)	October 2026

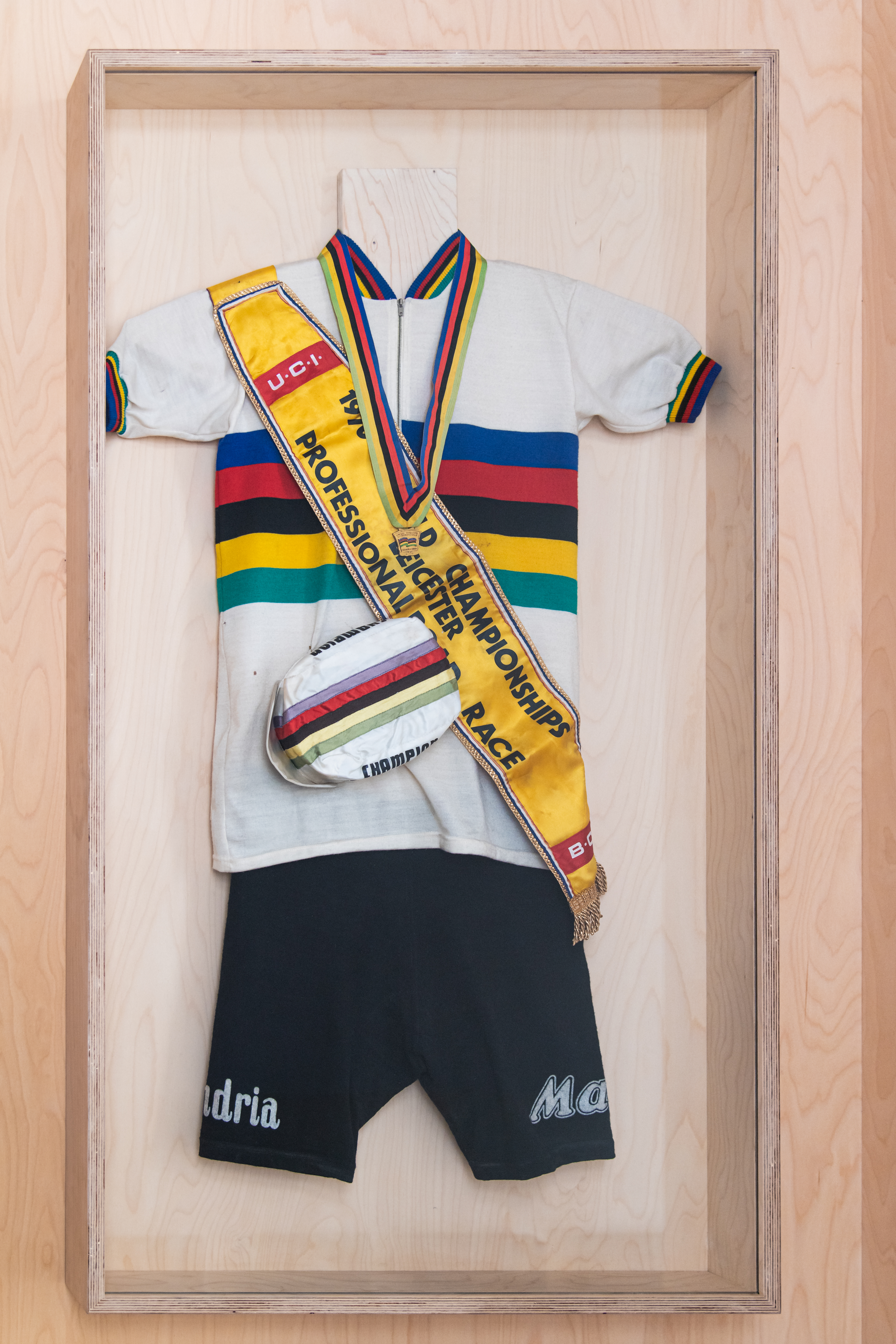
Rainbow Jersey of Jean-Pierre Monseré won in 1970, Leicester (collection KOERS Museum of Cycle Racing)

== Curse of the rainbow jersey ==
The curse of the rainbow jersey is a popular term to refer to the phenomenon where cyclists who have become World Champion often suffer from poor luck the next year – though, in some cases, the 'bad luck' was brought on by their own actions.

In 2015 an article by epidemiologist Thomas Perneger examining the curse was published in the Christmas edition of The BMJ. The study was based on statistical analysis of the results of World Road Champions and winners of the Giro di Lombardia (which was used as a comparison) in the riders' winning seasons and for the two years afterwards (to enable comparison of results before, during and after the supposed curse was in effect). The patterns of data were compared to four statistical models: the "spotlight effect", based on the theory that the apparent curse is due to increased public attention on the World Champion rather than a decline in success; the "marked man" hypothesis, which stipulates that the current wearer of the jersey is more closely marked by rivals during their year as champion; the "regression to the mean" model, which supposes that random variation in success rates will mean that a highly successful season for a rider is likely to be followed by less successful years; and a model combining the last two theories. The study found that the regression to the mean model was the one that fit the data best, for winners of both the World Championship and Il Lombardia, concluding that the curse probably does not exist. The author related the idea of the curse to medical professionals conflating correlation with causation when considering the effect of treatment on a patient.

== Designs ==
In the past, each discipline had its own variation of the jersey. Since the 2016 Cyclo-cross Worlds, the 'classic' jersey without symbols (previously reserved for the road race and paracycling road race) was assigned to all disciplines.

== World Cup version ==
World Cup Leader jersey

The UCI Road World Cup (1989–2004) leader wore a rainbow jersey with a vertical rainbow.

While the world champion wore the jersey in all events of the year in the specialization of his world title (the road champion wore it only in mass start road events, not, for example, in time trials or in track events), the World Cup leader wore it only in World Cup races.

== Other sports ==
Rainbow jersey colours have been used unofficially by triathlon, speed skating and Crashed Ice world champions.

== See also ==
- Distinctive jerseys in professional cycling
- UEC European Champion jersey
