= Thomas Ziegler =

Thomas Ziegler may refer to:

- Thomas Ziegler (ice hockey) (born 1978), Swiss ice hockey player
- Thomas Ziegler (cyclist) (born 1980), German road bicycle racer
- Thomas Ziegler (zoologist) (born 1970), German herpetologist
