= 2005–06 UCI Africa Tour =

African cycling season

- Second edition of the UCI Africa Tour

Details
- Dates: 26 October 2005–17 September 2006
- Location: Africa
- Races: 9

Champions
- Individual champion: Rabaki Jérémie Ouédraogo (BUR) (Café Samba)
- Teams' champion: Cycling Team Capec
- Nations' champion: South Africa

The 2005–06 UCI Africa Tour was the second season of the UCI Africa Tour. The season began on 26 October 2005 with the Tour du Faso and ended on 17 September 2006 with the Tour du Sénégal.

The points leader, based on the cumulative results of previous races, wears the UCI Africa Tour cycling jersey. Tiaan Kannemeyer from South Africa was the defending champion of the 2005 UCI Africa Tour. Rabaki Jérémie Ouédraogo of Burkina Faso was crowned as the 2005–06 UCI Africa Tour champion.

Throughout the season, points are awarded to the top finishers of stages within stage races and the final general classification standings of each of the stages races and one-day events. The quality and complexity of a race also determines how many points are awarded to the top finishers, the higher the UCI rating of a race, the more points are awarded. The UCI ratings from highest to lowest are as follows:

- Multi-day events: 2.HC, 2.1 and 2.2
- One-day events: 1.HC, 1.1 and 1.2

== Events ==
=== 2005 ===
Date	Race name	Location	UCI Rating	Winner	Team
26 October–6 November	Tour du Faso	Burkina Faso	2.2	Rabaki Jérémie Ouédraogo (BUR)	Café Samba
6 December	African Continental Championships – Time Trial	Egypt	CC	Alex Pavlov (RSA)	South Africa (national team)
9 December	African Continental Championships – Road Race	Egypt	CC	Rupert Rheeder (RSA)	South Africa (national team)

=== 2006 ===
Date	Race name	Location	UCI Rating	Winner	Team
12–15 January	La Tropicale Amissa Bongo	Gabon	2.2	Jussi Veikkanen (FIN)	Française des Jeux
11–19 February	Tour d'Egypte	Egypt	2.2	Ilya Chernyshov (KAZ)	Cycling Team Capec
25 February–11 March	Tour du Cameroun	Cameroon	2.2	Pavel Nevdakh (KAZ)	Brisaspor
8–12 March	Giro del Capo	South Africa	2.2	Peter Velits (SVK)	Team Konica Minolta
15–21 May	Boucle du Coton	Burkina Faso	2.2	Rabaki Jérémie Ouédraogo (BUR)	Burkina Faso (national team)
7–17 September	Tour du Sénégal	Senegal	2.2	Lukasz Podolski (POL)	Poland (national team)

== Final standings ==
=== Individual classification ===
Rank	Name	Points
1.	Rabaki Jérémie Ouédraogo (BUR)	216
2.	Rupert Rheeder (RSA)	209
3.	Abdul Wahab Sawadogo (BUR)	121
4.	Bakhtyar Mamyrov (KAZ)	101
5.	Pavel Nevdakh (KAZ)	96
6.	Lukasz Podolski (POL)	88
7.	David George (RSA)	86
8.	Saidou Rouamba (BUR)	83
9.	Jacques Fullard (RSA)	80
10.	Darren Lill (RSA)	77

=== Team classification ===
Rank	Team	Points
1.	Cycling Team Capec	130
2.	Team Konica Minolta	114
3.	Relax–GAM	86
4.	Barloworld	38
5.	Jartazi–7Mobile	24
6.	Team Wiesenhof–Akud	21
7.	Dukla Trenčín	17
8.	Marco Polo	17
9.	KrolStonE Continental Team	4
10.	Team Lamonta	2

=== Nation classification ===
Rank	Nation	Points
1.	South Africa	985
2.	Burkina Faso	536
3.	Egypt	172
4.	Zimbabwe	160
5.	Ivory Coast	140
6.	Morocco	138
7.	Angola	78
8.	Cameroon	77
9.	Mauritius	70
10.	Tunisia	48
