= Distinctive jerseys in professional cycling =

Colour-coded jerseys to indicate the position of riders in cycling competitions

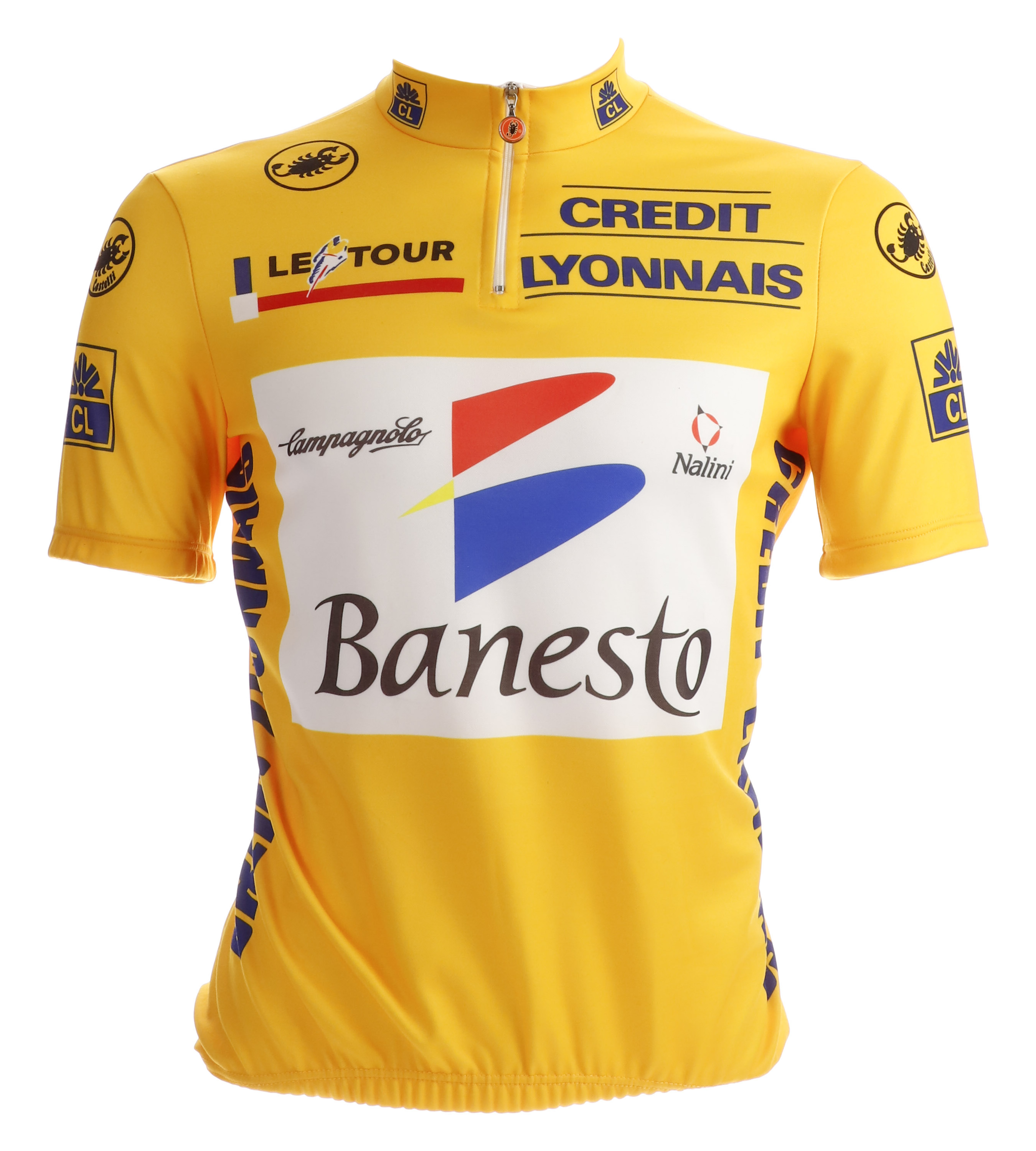
Yellow Jersey won by Miguel Induráin during the 1995 Tour de France (collection KOERS. Museum of Cycle Racing)

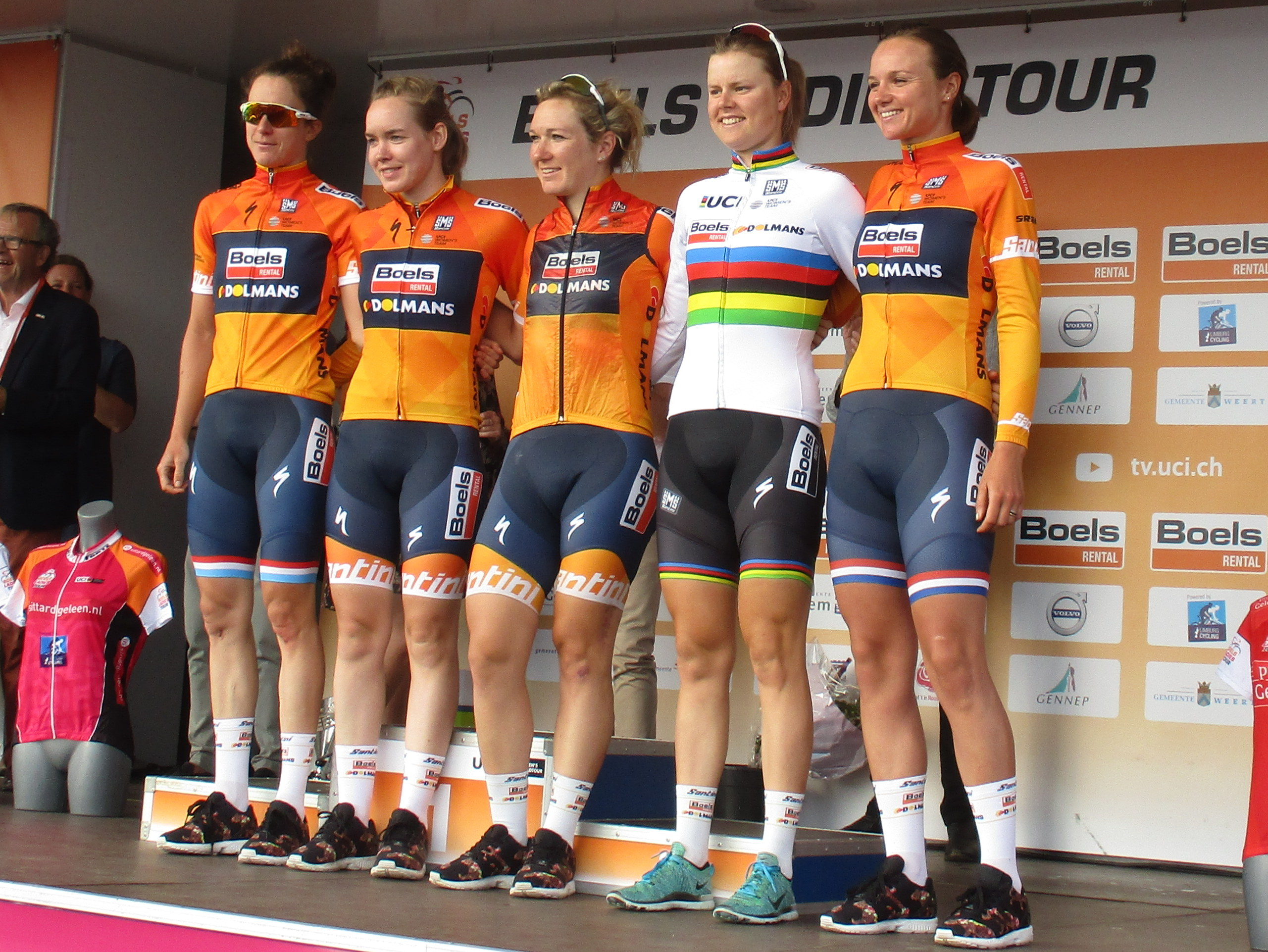
Award presentation of the winners of the Boels Women's Tour 2017 at the Tom Dumoulin Bike Park in Sittard-Geleen.

Jerseys symbolising race positions include the yellow jersey, or maillot jaune, from the Tour de France, the pink jersey, or maglia rosa, from the Giro d'Italia, and the red jersey, or la roja, from the Vuelta a España. The first two jerseys were given the same color as the paper their original main sponsors (both sports newspapers) were printed on: yellow and pink paper, respectively. The overall leader at the Vuelta at present wears a red jersey, although previously it has been the "maillot amarillo" (yellow jersey) and the "jersey de oro" (golden jersey). Many other jerseys are colored or designed after a sponsor's logo, and some jerseys change color when a new sponsor is found.

== Grand Tour races ==
Course	General leader	Points leader	Mountain leader	Youth leader	Other	Historical
(Italy) Giro d'Italia	Pink jersey (maglia rosa)	Cyclamen Jersey (maglia ciclamino)	Blue jersey (maglia azzurra)	White jersey (maglia bianca)		Intergiro: Blue jersey (maglia azzurra) (1989-2006): Last in Race: Black jersey (maglia nera) (1946-1951): Points classification: Red jersey (maglia rossa) (1967-1968, 2010–2016): Mountains classification: Green jersey (maglia verde) (1974-2011)
Tour de France	Yellow jersey (maillot jaune)	Green jersey (maillot vert)	Red Polka dot jersey (maillot à pois rouges)	White jersey (maillot blanc)	Last in race: Red lantern (figure of speech): Most combative: Red number: Leading Team: Yellow Number	Combination classification (1968-1989): White jersey (maillot blanc) (1968-1974) Combined jersey (maillot mondrian) (1980-1989): Intermediate sprints classification (1971-1989): Red jersey (maillot rouge) (1984-1989)
(Spain) Vuelta a España	Red jersey (maillot rojo)	Green jersey (maillot verde)	Blue Polka dot jersey (maillot de lunares)	White jersey (maillot blanco)	Most combative: Yellow number (dorsal amarillo): Leading Team: Red Number (dorsal rojo)	Combination classification: Combined jersey (maillot multicolor) (1988-1992) Orange-White-Green jersey (maillot tricolor) (2005) White jersey (maillot blanco) (2006-2018): General classification: Orange jersey (maillot naranja) (1935-1936, 1942, 1977) White jersey (maillot blanco) (1941) Yellow jersey (maillot amarillo) (1955-1976, 1978–1998) Gold jersey (maillot oro) (1999-2009): Mountains classification: Black dotted jersey (maillot granos de café) (1988-1989) White jersey (maillot blanco) (1994-1998) White-Gold jersey (maillot blanquioro) (1999) White-Blue jersey (maillot blanquiazul) (2000) Granate-white jersey (maillot graniblanco) (2001) Orange jersey (maillot naranja) (2002-2003, 2006) Granate jersey (maillot granate) (2004-2005) Silver jersey (maillot plata) (2007): Points classification: Rosa jersey (maillot fucsia) (1994-1998) Silver jersey (maillot plata) (1999-2000) Orange jersey (maillot naranja) (2001) Granate-white jersey (maillot granate-blanco) (2002) Orange dot jersey (maillot de lunares) (2003) Fish jersey (maillot de peces) (2004-2006) Granate jersey (maillot granate) (2007) Blue jersey (maillot azul) (2008): Special Sprints classification: Blue jersey (maillot azul) (1999-2000) Green-White jersey (maillot verdiblanco) (2001): Young Classification: Red number (dorsal rojo) (2017-2018): Most combative: Green number (dorsal verde) (20??-2018)

== Women's Major Tour races ==
Course	General leader	Points leader	Mountain leader	Youth leader	Other	Historical
(Italy) Giro d'Italia Women	Pink jersey (maglia rosa)	Cyclamen Jersey (maglia ciclamino)	Green jersey (maglia verde)	White jersey (maglia bianca)		
(Spain) La Vuelta Femenina	Red jersey (maillot rojo)	Green jersey (maillot verde)	Blue Polka dot jersey (maillot de lunares azules)		Combative leader: White jersey (maillot blanco)	General leader: Violet jersey (maillot morado) (2015-2019)
Tour de France Femmes	Yellow jersey (maillot jaune)	Green jersey (maillot vert)	Red Polka dot jersey (maillot à pois rouges)	White jersey (maillot blanc)	*Most combative: Red number: Leading Team: Yellow Number	

== UCI World Tour (stage) races ==
Course	General leader	Points leader	Mountain leader	Youth leader	Other	Historical
(Australia) Tour Down Under	Ochre jersey	Blue jersey	Blue Polka dot jersey	White jersey		
(United Arab Emirates) UAE Tour	Red jersey	Green jersey		White jersey	Intermediate sprints leader: Black jersey	
(France) Paris–Nice	Yellow and white jersey (maillot jaune et blanc)	Green jersey (maillot vert)	Polka-dot jersey (maillot à pois rouges)	White jersey (maillot blanc)	Most combative: Red number: Leading Team: Yellow Number	General Jersey: Blue jersey (maillot bleu) (1933-1945) Green jersey (maillot vert) (1946-1954) White jersey (maillot blanc) (1955-2001) Yellow jersey (maillot jaune) (1951-1954, 2002–2017): Points Jersey: Pink jersey (maillot rose) (????-1984, 2000) Yellow jersey (maillot jaune) (1999) Violet jersey (maillot violette) (2001)
(Italy) Tirreno–Adriatico	Blue jersey (maglia azzurra)	Cyclamen Jersey (maglia ciclamino)	Green jersey (maglia verde)	White jersey (maglia bianca)		General Jersey: Yellow-Red jersey (????-2007): Points Jersey: Red jersey (maglia rossa) (????-2017) Orange jersey (maglia arancio) (2018-2020)
(Spain) Volta a Catalunya	White and Green striped jersey (mallot blanc amb ratlles verdes)	White and blue striped jersey (mallot blanc amb ratlles blaves)	White and red striped jersey (mallot blanc amb ratlles vermelles)	White and orange striped jersey (mallot blanc amb ratlles taronjas)	Leading Team: Red Number (dorsal rojo): Most combative: Green number (dorsal verde)	Sprints classification; Black and white jersey (2014 - 2017) White jersey (2011 - 2013)
(Spain) Itzulia Basque Country	Yellow jersey	Green jersey	Polka-dot jersey	Blue jersey	Leading Team: Red Number (dorsal rojo): Most combative: Green number (dorsal verde)	Intermediate sprints classification: Cyan jersey (????-2019): Mountain leader classification: White dots on red jersey (????-2021)
(Switzerland) Tour de Romandie	Yellow jersey	Green jersey	Pink jersey	White jersey	Most combative: Red Number: Leading Team: Yellow Number	
(Switzerland) Tour de Suisse	Yellow jersey	Black jersey	Blue jersey		Best Swiss Rider: Red jersey: Leading Team: Yellow Number	
(France) Critérium du Dauphiné Critérium du Dauphiné Libéré (1947-2010)	Yellow and blue jersey (maillot jaune et bleu)	Green jersey (maillot vert)	White polka-dot blue jersey (maillot bleu à pois blanc)	White jersey (maillot blanc)	Leading Team: Yellow Number	Mountains classification: White Polka dot jersey (maillot rouge à pois blanc) (1948-2017)
(Poland) Tour de Pologne	Yellow jersey (żółta koszulka)	White jersey (biała koszulka)	Rose jersey (różowa koszulka)		Intermediate sprints leader: Blue jersey (niebieska koszulka)	
(Belgium) / (Netherlands) BinckBank Tour Eneco Tour (2005-2016)	Green jersey (groen trui or maillot vert)	Red jersey (rode trui or maillot rouge)			Combativity leader: White jersey (witte trui or maillot blanc)	General leader: Red jersey (rode trui or maillot rouge) (2005-2007) White jersey (witte trui or maillot blanc) (2008-2016): Points leader: Blue jersey (blauw trui or maillot bleu) (2005, 2017) White jersey (witte trui or maillot blanc) (2006-2007) Red jersey (rode trui or maillot rouge) (2008-2016): Mountains leader: White jersey (witte trui or maillot blanc) (2005): Young leader: Yellow jersey (geel trui or maillot jaune) (2005-2006) Green jersey (groen trui or maillot vert) (2010–2011): Combativity leader: Black jersey (witte trui or maillot blanc) (2012–2014, 2017–2018) Green jersey (groen trui or maillot vert) (2015)
(China) Tour of Guangxi	Red jersey	Blue jersey	Blue Polka dot jersey	White jersey		
(United States) Tour of California	Yellow jersey	Green jersey	Red jersey	White jersey		

== UCI ProSeries (stage) races ==
Course	General leader	Points leader	Mountain leader	Youth leader	Other	Historical
(Argentina) Vuelta a San Juan	White jersey (maillot blanco)	Yellow jersey (maillot amarillo)	Orange jersey (maillot naranja)	Green jersey (maillot verde)		
(Spain) Volta a la Comunitat Valenciana	Yellow jersey (maillot amarillo)	Orange jersey (maillot naranja)	Polka dot jersey (maillot de lunares)	White jersey (maillot blanco)		
(Malaysia) Tour de Langkawi	Yellow jersey	Aqua jersey	Red jersey	White jersey		
Tour of Oman	Red jersey	Green jersey		White jersey	Combativity leader: Gold jersey	
(France) Tour La Provence	Multicolor jersey (maillot multicolore)	Green jersey (maillot vert)	Red jersey (maillot rouge)	White jersey (maillot blanc)	Best Provence: Orange jersey (maillot orange)	General leader: Yellow jersey (maillot jaune) (2016) Blue jersey (maillot bleu) (2017-2018)
(Spain) Vuelta a Andalucía	Yellow jersey (maillot amarillo)	Green jersey (maillot verde)	Orange jersey (maillot naranja)		Intermediate sprints leader: Blue jersey (maillot azul)	General leader: Red jersey (maillot rojo): Mountains leader: Green jersey (maillot verde): Int. Sprints leader: White jersey (maillot blanco): Points leader: Blue jersey (maillot azul) Orange jersey (maillot naranja)
(Portugal) Volta ao Algarve	Yellow jersey	Green jersey	Blue jersey	White jersey		
(China) Tour of Hainan	Yellow jersey	Green jersey	Polka-dot jersey		Best Asian rider: Cyan jersey	
Presidential Tour of Turkey	Turquoise jersey	Green jersey	Red jersey		Best Turkish leader: White jersey	
(Austria) / (Italy) Tour of the Alps Giro del Trentino (1962-2014, 2016) Giro del Trentino Melinda (2015)	Cyclamen Jersey (maglia ciclamino)		Green Jersey (maglia verde)	White jersey (maglia bianca)	Sprints leader: Red jersey (maglia rossa)	
(United Kingdom) Tour de Yorkshire	Blue jersey	Green jersey	Rosa jersey		Combativity: Grey jersey	
(France) 4 Jours de Dunkerque	Pink jersey (maillot rose)	Green jersey (maillot vert)	Polka-dot jersey (maillot à pois rouges)	White jersey (maillot blanc)		
Tour of Norway	Orange jersey	Blue Jersey	Blue polka dot jersey	White jersey		Mountains leader: Red polka dot jersey (??? - 2023)
(France) Boucles de la Mayenne	Yellow jersey	Green jersey	Red Polka dot jersey	White jersey		
Tour of Belgium	Blue jersey	Red jersey		White jersey	Stage winner: Green jersey	
Tour of Slovenia	Green jersey	Cyan jersey	Dark blue jersey	White jersey		
Tour of Austria	Red jersey	Green jersey	Red Polka dot jersey	White jersey		General leader: Yellow jersey
(China) Tour of Qinghai Lake	Red jersey	Green jersey	Red polka dot jersey	White jersey		
(Belgium) Tour de Wallonie	Yellow jersey	Green jersey	White jersey	Red jersey	Intermediate Sprints: Violet jersey	
(Spain) Vuelta a Burgos	Violet jersey (maillot violeta)	Green jersey (maillot verde)	Red jersey (maillot rojo)	White jersey (maillot blanco)	Leading Team: Red Number (dorsal rojo)	
(United States) Tour of Utah	Yellow jersey	White jersey	Blue polka dot jersey	Aqua jersey	Combativity leader: Orange jersey	
Arctic Race of Norway	Midnight Sun jersey	Blue jersey	Peacock jersey	Red and white jersey	Combativity: Red number: Best teammate; Viking jersey	General leader: Blue and yellow jersey (2016 - 2018): Mountains leader: Salmon jersey (bold) (2021) Salmon jersey (patterned) (2019): Young rider: White jersey (2016-2022) White and black jersey (2015): Best teammate; Viking jersey (2014-2015)
(Denmark) Danmark Rundt	Cyan jersey	Green jersey	Blue polka dot jersey	White jersey	Combativity: Dark blue jersey	Mountains leader: Black with Blue polka dots jersey (2018 - 2019)
(Germany) Deutschland Tour	Red jersey	Green jersey	Blue jersey	White jersey		
(United Kingdom) Tour of Britain	Red white and blue jersey	Green jersey	Black jersey	White jersey		General leader: Gold jersey (2011 - 2016) Green jersey (2017 - 2019) Blue & red jersey (2021) Red jersey (2022): Points leader: Orange jersey (2017 - 2018) Cyan jersey (2019 - 2021) Navy jersey (2022): Sprints leader: Green jersey (2011 - 2016) Red jersey (2017 - 2021) White jersey (2022)
Tour de Luxembourg	Yellow jersey	Blue jersey	Green jersey	White jersey		
(France) Route d'Occitanie	Orange jersey	Green jersey	Blue jersey	White jersey		

== UCI Continental Tour (stage) races ==
=== UCI Europe Tour ===
Course	General leader	Points leader	Mountain leader	Youth leader	Other	Historical
(France) Étoile de Bessèges	Orange jersey (maillot orange)	Yellow jersey (maillot jaune)	Blue jersey (maillot bleu)	White jersey (maillot blanc)		
(Spain) Vuelta a Murcia	Yellow jersey (maillot amarillo)	White jersey (maillot blanco)	Red jersey (maillot rojo)		Intermediate Sprints leader: Blue jersey (maillot azul)	
(Turkey) Tour of Antalya	Magenta jersey (macenta formayı)	Yellow/gold jersey (sarı formayı)	Orange jersey (turuncu formayı)		Climate change awareness classification (intermediate sprints): Green jersey (yeşil formayı)	
(France) Tour du Haut Var	Yellow jersey (maillot jaune)	Green jersey (maillot vert)	Red jersey (maillot rouge)	White jersey (maillot blanc)		
(France) Tour de Savoie Mont-Blanc	Yellow jersey (maillot jaune)	Blue jersey (maillot vert)	Red jersey (maillot rouge)	White jersey (maillot blanc)	Team leader: Pink jersey: Combativity leader: Green jersey: Combination leader: Orange jersey: Stage Winner leader: Cyan jersey	
(Greece) International Tour of Rhodes						
(Romania) Sibiu Cycling Tour						
(Turkey) Tour of Mevlana						
(Romania) Tour of Bihor - Bellotto						
(Poland) Dookoła Mazowsza						
(Portugal) Troféu Joaquim Agostinho						
Tour of Kosovo						
(France) Tour Alsace	White Yellow jersey	White Green jersey	White Red jersey	White Blue jersey	Combativity leader: White Combined jersey: First French rider: White Pink jersey: Intermediate Sprints leader: White Blue-Green jersey	
Volta a Portugal	Yellow jersey	Green jersey	Polka dot jersey <small	White jersey		
(France) Tour de l'Ain	Yellow jersey (maillot jaune)	Green jersey (maillot vert)	White Polka dot jersey (maillot bleu à pois blanc)	White jersey (maillot blanc)	Combativity: Red number	
(Belgium) Three Days of West Flanders	Yellow jersey	Green jersey		White jersey	Intermediate sprints leader: Red jersey: Best West Flandrian: Black jersey: Leading Team: Yellow Number	
(Portugal) Volta ao Alentejo	Yellow jersey	Green jersey	Brown jersey	White jersey		
(France) Tour de Normandie	Yellow jersey (maillot jaune)	Green jersey (maillot vert)	Blue Polka dot jersey (maillot à pois bleus)	White jersey (maillot blanc)	Intermediate sprints leader: Red jersey (maillot rouge)	
(Italy) Settimana Internazionale di Coppi e Bartali	Red jersey	White jersey	Green jersey	Orange jersey		
(Belgium) Three Days of Bruges–De Panne	White jersey	Green jersey	Granate jersey		Sprints leader: Blue jersey	
(Belgium) Triptyque des Monts et Châteaux	Yellow jersey	Green jersey	Pink jersey	Blue jersey	Sprints leader: White jersey: Stage Winner Jersey: Orange jersey	
(France) Circuit de la Sarthe	Yellow jersey	Green jersey	Grey jersey	Red Polka dot jersey	Sprints leader: Red jersey	
(France) Circuit des Ardennes	Yellow jersey	Grey jersey	Gold Polka dot jersey	White jersey	Combativity leader: Red jersey	
(France) Tour du Loir-et-Cher	Yellow jersey	Green jersey	Blue Polka dot jersey	White jersey		
(Turkey) Tour of Mersin						
(Spain) Vuelta a Castilla y León	Multicolor jersey (maillot multicolor)	Green jersey (maillot verde)	Red jersey (maillot rojo)		Intermediate sprints leader: Blue jersey (maillot azul)	General leader: Granate jersey (maillot granate) (????-2010) Grey jersey (maillot gris) (2011-2012)
(Spain) Vuelta a Asturias	Blue jersey (maillot azul)	Green jersey (maillot verde)	Blue Polka dot jersey (maillot de lunares)		Intermediate sprints leader: Newspaper jersey (maillot del periódico): Team leader: Red number (dorsal rojo)	General leader: Yellow jersey (maillot amarillo) (1925-2010): Mountains leader: Green-Blue jersey (maillot verdiazul): Points leader: Red jersey (maillot rojo)
Tour of Croatia	Red jersey	Blue jersey	Green jersey	White jersey		
(France) Tour de Bretagne	Green and white jersey (maillot vert et blanc)	Blue and white jersey (maillot bleu et blanc)	Red Polka dot jersey (maillot à pois rouges)	Red jersey (maillot rouge)	Combination leader: Pink jersey (maillot rose): Intermediate Sprints leader: White jersey (maillot blanc)	
(Luxembourg) Flèche du Sud						
(Azerbaijan) Tour d'Azerbaïdjan	Turquoise jersey	Green jersey	Red jersey	Violet jersey		
(France) Four Days of Dunkirk	Pink jersey	Green jersey (maillot vert)	Red Polka dot jersey (maillot à pois rouges)	White jersey (maillot blanc)		
(Poland) Szlakiem Grodów Piastowskich						
(France) Rhône-Alpes Isère Tour	Yellow jersey (maillot jaune)	Green jersey (maillot vert)	Purple jersey (maillot violette)	White jersey (maillot blanc)	Combination leader: Red jersey (maillot rouge): Sprints leader: Blue jersey (maillot bleu)	
(Germany) Tour de Berlin						
(France) Tour de Picardie	Green jersey (maillot vert)	Blue jersey (maillot bleu)				
(Portugal) Volta Internacional Cova da Beira	Yellow jersey	Green jersey	Blue jersey	White jersey		
(Poland) Bałtyk–Karkonosze Tour						
(France) Ronde de l'Isard	Yellow jersey (maillot jaune)	Green jersey (maillot vert)	Red Polka dot jersey (maillot à pois rouges)	Blue jersey (maillot bleu)		
(France) Paris–Arras Tour	Yellow jersey (maillot jaune)	Green jersey (maillot vert)	Red Polka dot jersey (maillot à pois rouges)	White jersey (maillot blanc)		
(Republic of Ireland) Rás Tailteann						
(Slovakia) Okolo Slovenska	Yellow jersey (žltý dres)	Blue Polka dot jersey (biely dres s modrými bodmi)	Red Polka dot jersey (biely dres s červenými bodmi)	White jersey (biely dres)	Best Slovak rider: White-blue-red jersey (biel-modro-červený dres)	
(Hungary) Tour de Hongrie	Yellow jersey (sárga trikó)	Green jersey (zöld trikó)	Red jersey (piros trikó)		Best Hungarian rider: White jersey (fehér trikó)	

=== UCI Asia Tour ===
Course	General leader	Points leader	Mountain leader	Youth leader	Combative leader	Historical
Tour of Oman	Red jersey	Green jersey		White jersey	Gold jersey	
(Saudi Arabia) Saudi Tour	Green jersey	Red jersey		White jersey	Red Polka dot jersey	

=== Former Stage races ===
Course	General leader	Points leader	Mountain leader	Youth leader	Other	Historical
(United States) Tour of Missouri (2007-2009)	Yellow jersey	Green jersey	Aqua jersey	White jersey		
Vuelta Mexico Telmex (2008-2015)	Yellow jersey (maillot amarillo)		Red jersey (maillot rojo)	Blue jersey (maillot azul)	Combativity Leader: Green jersey (maillot verde): Best Mexican rider: White jersey (maillot blanco)	
Tour of Qatar (2002-2016)	Gold jersey	Silver jersey		White jersey		
(France) Critérium International (1932-2016)	Yellow jersey (maillot jaune)	Green jersey (maillot vert)	Red Polka dot jersey (maillot à pois rouges)	White jersey (maillot blanc)	Leading Team: Yellow Number	
(France) La Méditerranéenne (1974-2016)	Yellow jersey (maillot jaune)	Green jersey (maillot vert)	Red jersey (maillot rouge)	White jersey (maillot blanc)		

== Championship Jerseys ==
Championship of	Jersey
World Cycling Championship	Rainbow jersey
African Cyling Championships	
Asian Cyling Championships	
European Cycling Championship	UEC European Champion jersey
Oceanic Cyling Championships	
Pan American Cyling Championships	
UCI Women's Road World Cup (1998-2015)	
UCI Men's Road World Cup (1989-2004)	
Argentina	
Australia	
Austria	
Belarus	
Belgium	Driekleur trikot
Brazil	
Burkina Faso	
Canada	
Chile	
Colombia	
Croatia	
Czech Republic	
Denmark	
Estonia	
Finland	
France	
Germany	
Great Britain	
Hungary	
Ireland	
Italy	Maglia tricolore
Japan	
Kazakhstan	
Latvia	
Lithuania	
Luxembourg	
Mexico	
Moldova	
The Netherlands	
New Zealand	
Norway	
Poland	
Portugal	
Russia	
Slovakia	
Slovenia	
South Africa	
Spain	
Sweden	
Switzerland	
Ukraine	
United States	
Uzbekistan	
Venezuela	

== See also ==
- Cycling jersey
