= Raffaele Ferrara =

Italian cyclist

Personal information
- Born: October 30, 1976 (age 49) Naples, Italy

Cycling career
- Sport: Cycling
- Current team: Retired
- Discipline: Road
- Role: Rider

Professional teams
- 2001–2004: Alessio
- 2005–2006: Androni Giocattoli–3C Casalinghi
- 2007–2008: LPR
- 2010: Carmiooro NGC

Raffaele Ferrara (born October 30, 1976, in Naples) is a former Italian professional cyclist.

== Major results ==
1998
2nd Trofeo Zsšdi
2000
1st Girobio
1st Giro del Friuli Venezia Giulia
2001
3rd Brixia Tour
2002
3rd Rund um die Hainleite
2005
2nd Rund um die Nürnberger Altstadt
2006
2nd Giro del Veneto
3rd Trofeo Matteotti
3rd Tre Valli Varesine
3rd Coppa Placci
3rd Giro della Romagna
2007
2nd Grand Prix of Aargau Canton
