= Rupert Rheeder =

South African cyclist

Personal information
- Born: 19 November 1976 (age 49) Barberton, Mpumalanga, South Africa

Cycling career
- Sport: Cycling
- Current team: Retired
- Discipline: Road
- Role: Rider

Amateur team
- 2007: Harmony-Schwinn

Professional team
- 2005: Team Exel

Rupert Rheeder (born 19 November 1976 in Barberton) is a South African former road cyclist.

== Major results ==
2005
African Cycling Championships

1st Road race
3rd Time trial

1st Stage 3 (TTT) Tour d'Egypte
5th Overall Tour du Sénégal

1st Points classification
1st Prologue & Stages 1 & 6

2006
1st Prologue & Stages 1 & 6 Tour d'Egypte
2nd Overall UCI Africa Tour
10th Overall Tour of Chongming Island
