= Alberto Curtolo =

Italian road bicycle racer

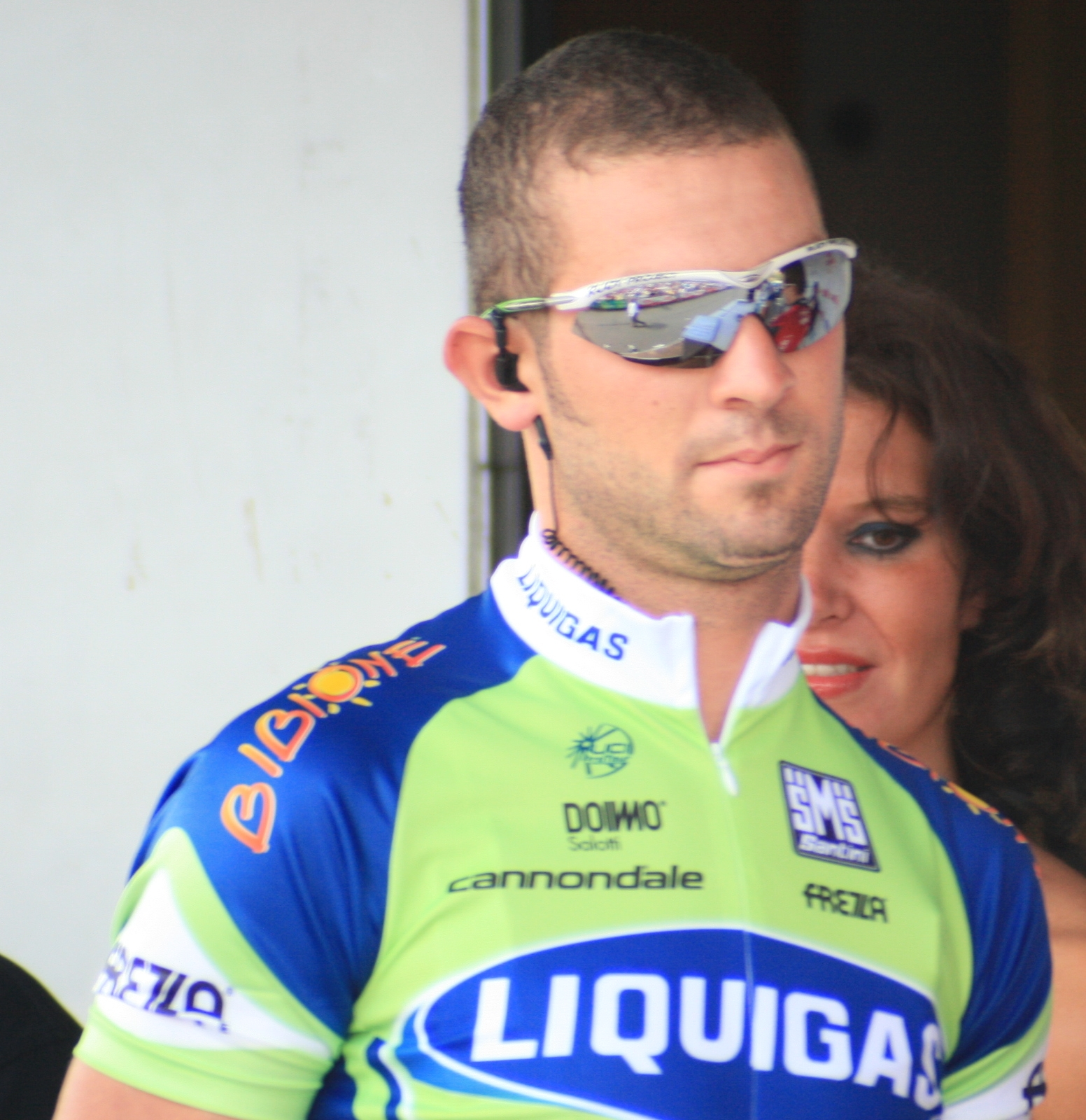

Personal information
- Full name: Alberto Curtolo
- Born: 14 August 1984 (age 42) Treviso, Italy

Cycling career
- Sport: Cycling
- Discipline: Road
- Role: Rider

Professional team
- 2006, 2008: Liquigas

Alberto Curtolo (born 14 August 1984) is an Italian road bicycle racer.

== Palmares ==
2005
1st, Stage 9, Volta do Estado de São Paulo
1st, Stage 1, Berliner Rundfahrt (U23)
2007
1st, Stage 2a, Giro del Friuli Venezia Giulia
