= Cycling jersey =

Technical clothing for cycling

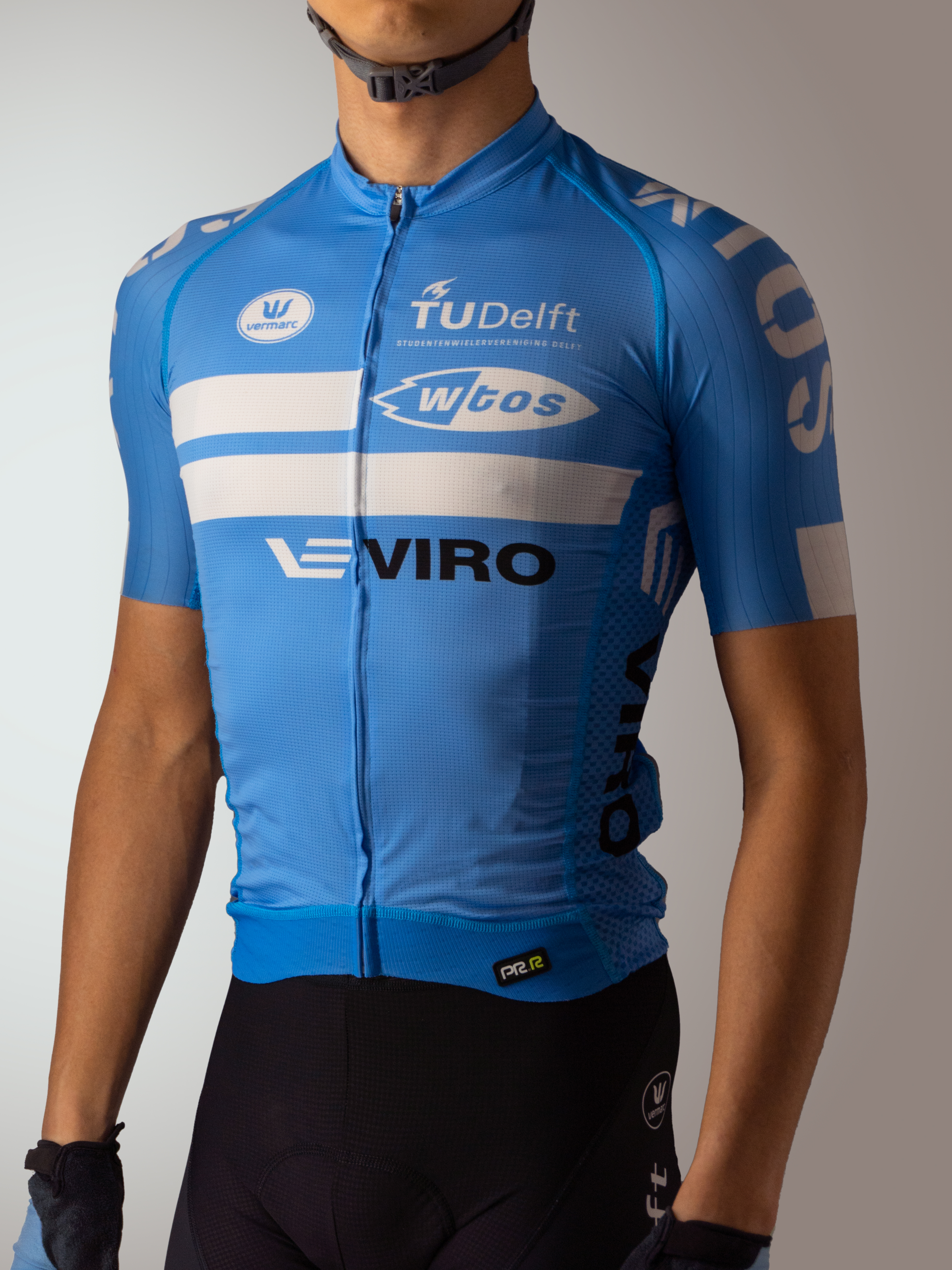
A road cyclist wearing a typical, modern slim-fitting summer jersey with graphics design, association and sponsor logos.

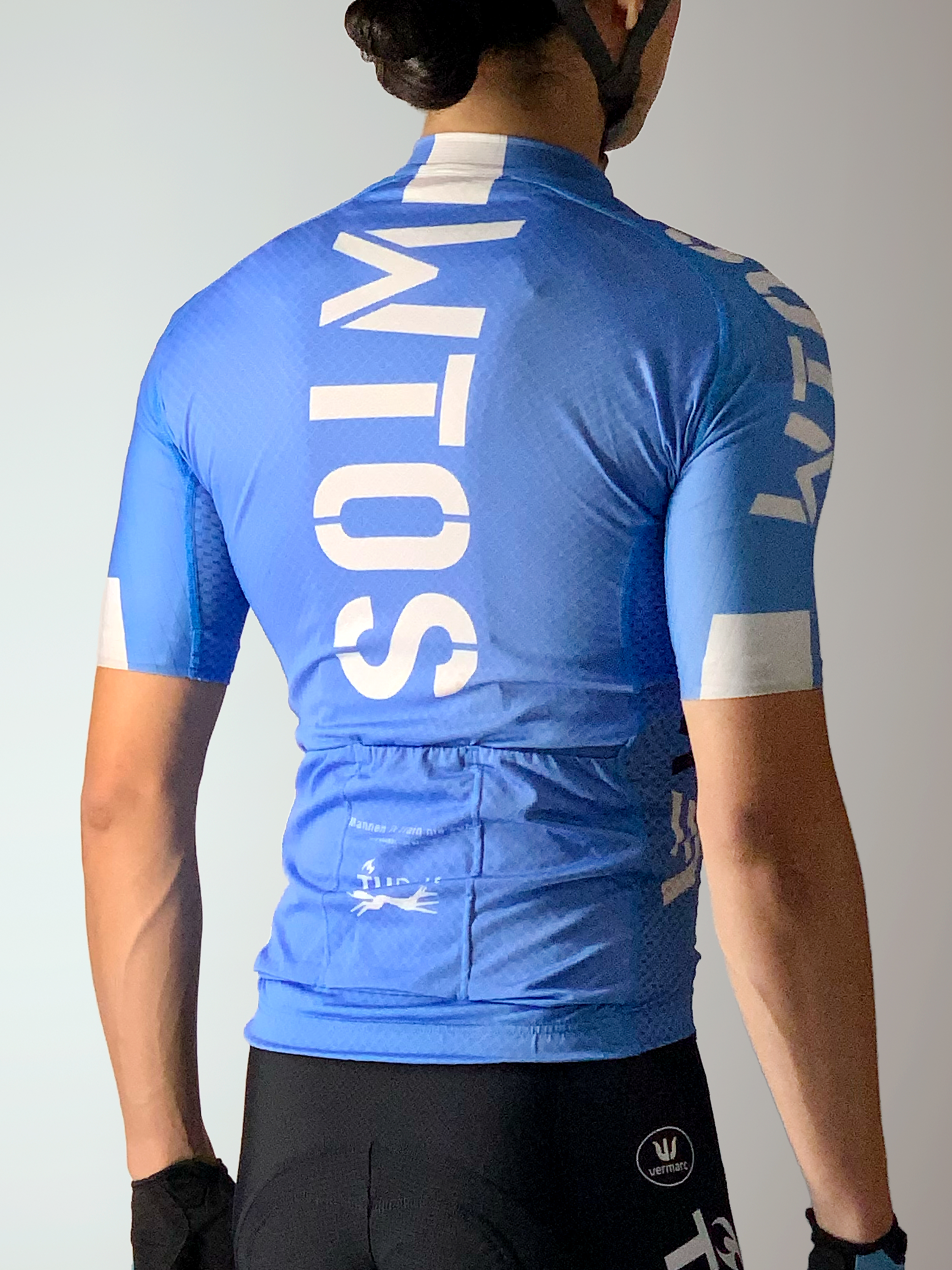
The rear of the jersey features pockets at the waist facing upwards to store belongings.

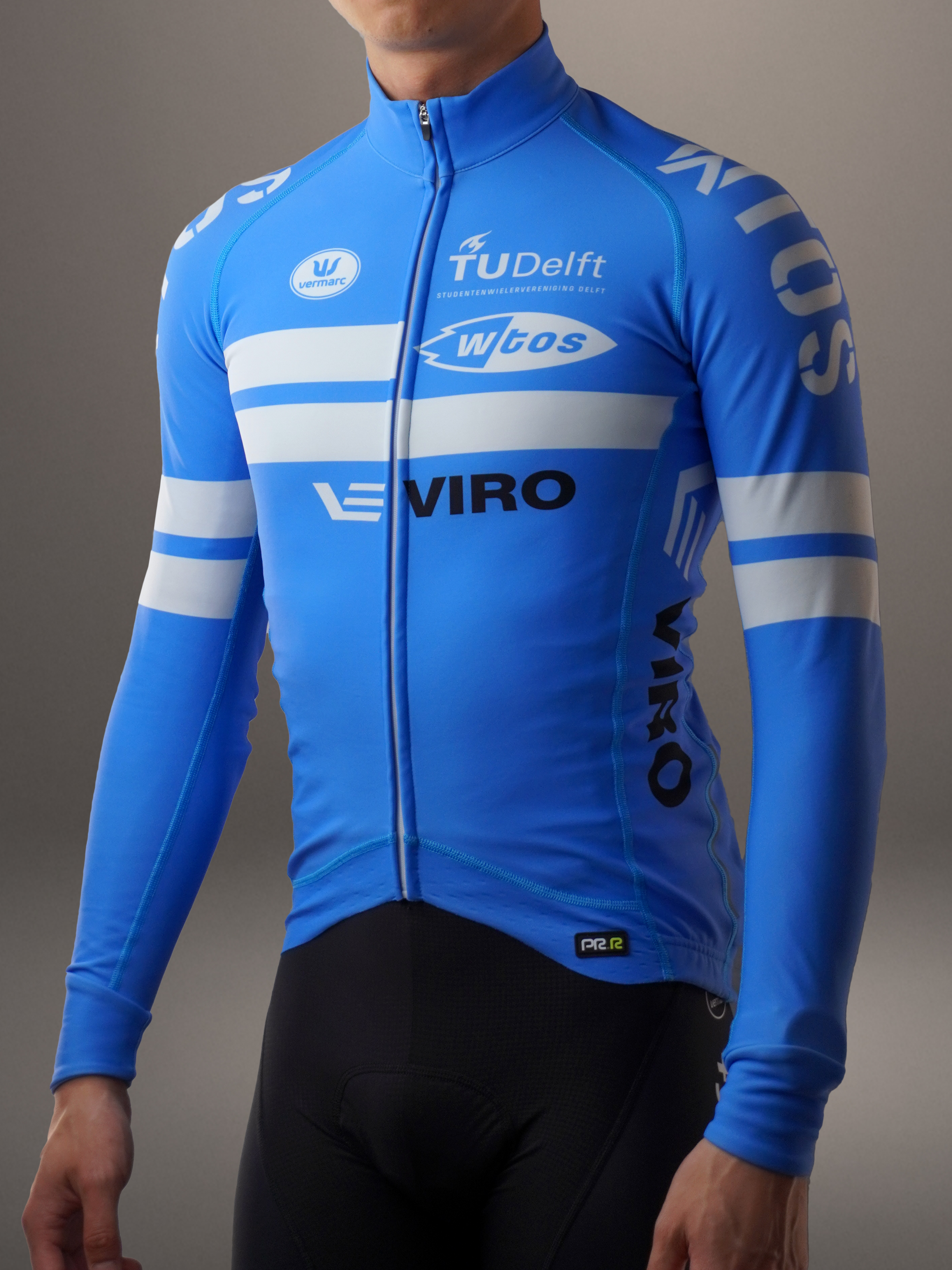
Long sleeve thermal cycling jersey that can be used as a jacket.

A cycling jersey is a specialised jersey for cycling.

The cycling jersey used to be made of wool since the inception of cycling as a sport in the early 1900s, while contemporary jerseys have evolved into technical sportswear that is lightweight, fitted, made of synthetic and moisture-wicking fabric.

A specialised cycling jersey for the road discipline features the following unique characteristics:

- A longer cut in the back to accommodate the bent-over cycling position
- Pockets on the back panel to prevent spill
- Silicone grippers at the hem to prevent the jersey from moving up the body while cycling
- Full length zip to allow for ventilation
- Tight-fitting cut to eliminate loose fabric and reduce air resistance
- Moisture-wicking material to keep the cyclist cooler and more comfortable

Cycling jerseys are available in various cuts. For instance, a loose 'club cut' offering relaxed fit for recreational cyclists, and a form-fitting 'race cut' featuring a tailored fit that is tighter and shorter. Jerseys for other cycling disciplines such as mountain biking have different characteristics. Looser jerseys allow body armour to be worn beneath. Long sleeve options also provide additional protection against branches and twigs.

Professional cycling is heavily sponsored. Regulations specify the size, colour and the placement of sponsor, national federation and manufacturer logos and other graphics. In professional races, certain colours or patterns have special symbolism that signify the leader or the champion of a race or tour. Numbers are pinned on the back of the jersey for a race.

== See also ==
- Cycling
- Cycling kit
- Distinctive jerseys in professional cycling
- Exercise dress
- Performance fabrics
- Road bicycle racing
- Road cycling
- Spandex
- Sportswear
