= Thomas Ziegler (cyclist) =

German cyclist

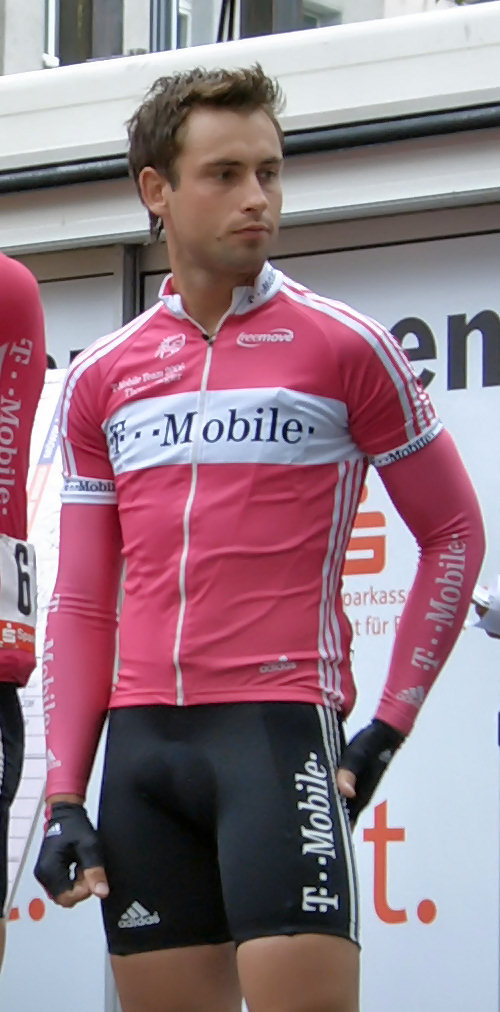

Personal information
- Full name: Thomas Ziegler
- Born: November 24, 1980 (age 45) Arnstadt, East Germany

Cycling career
- Sport: Cycling
- Current team: Retired
- Discipline: Road
- Role: Rider
- Rider type: All-rounder

Amateur team
- 2000–2002: TEAG Köstritzer

Professional teams
- 2003: Team Wiesenhof
- 2004–2005: Gerolsteiner
- 2006–2007: T-Mobile Team

Thomas Ziegler (born November 24, 1980, in Arnstadt) is a German former professional road bicycle racer. In early 2008, at the age of 27, he announced that he retired from professional cycling to open a bike shop in Hannover, where he currently lives.

== Major results ==
2002
3rd Time trial, National Under-23 Road Championships
3rd Overall Thüringen-Rundfahrt

1st Stage 5

5th Rund um den Henninger Turm U23
6th Road race, European Under-23 Road Championships
9th Rund um die Hainleite
2004
2nd Overall Giro della Provincia di Lucca
8th Overall Niedersachsen-Rundfahrt
2005
1st Stage 2 Sachsen Tour
2nd Rund um die Hainleite
5th Overall Niedersachsen-Rundfahrt
2006
3rd Overall Danmark Rundt
3rd Overall Rheinland-Pfalz Rundfahrt
5th Overall Volta ao Algarve
10th GP Chiasso
2007
8th Overall Volta ao Algarve
8th Trofeo Calvia

=== Grand Tour general classification results timeline ===
Grand Tour	2004	2005	2006	2007
Giro d'Italia	63	DNF	—	DNF
Tour de France	—	—	—	—
Vuelta a España	—	66	DNF	—

Legend
—	Did not compete
DNF	Did not finish
