= List of 2012 Summer Olympics medal winners =

The 2012 Summer Olympics, officially known as the Games of the XXX Olympiad, were held in London, United Kingdom, from 25 July 2012 to 12 August 2012.

Approximately 10,500 athletes participated in 302 events in 26 sports. Athletes from the United States won the most gold medals, with 46, and the most overall, with 103. Michael Phelps and Missy Franklin won the most gold medals at the games with four each. Phelps also won the greatest number of medals overall winning six in total. Bahrain, Botswana, Cyprus, Gabon, Grenada, Guatemala and Montenegro each won their first Olympic medal ever, with Grenada's being gold.

== Archery ==
Event	Gold	Silver	Bronze
Men's individual	Oh Jin-Hyek; South Korea	Takaharu Furukawa; Japan	Dai Xiaoxiang; China
Men's team	Italy; Michele Frangilli; Marco Galiazzo; Mauro Nespoli	United States; Brady Ellison; Jacob Wukie; Jake Kaminski	South Korea; Im Dong-Hyun; Kim Bub-Min; Oh Jin-Hyek
Women's individual	Ki Bo-bae; South Korea	Aída Román; Mexico	Mariana Avitia; Mexico
Women's team	South Korea; Lee Sung-Jin; Ki Bo-bae; Choi Hyeonju	China; Fang Yuting; Cheng Ming; Xu Jing	Japan; Kaori Kawanaka; Ren Hayakawa; Miki Kanie

== Athletics ==
=== Men's events ===
Games	Gold	Silver	Bronze
100 metres	Usain Bolt; Jamaica	Yohan Blake; Jamaica	Justin Gatlin; United States
200 metres	Usain Bolt; Jamaica	Yohan Blake; Jamaica	Warren Weir; Jamaica
400 metres	Kirani James; Grenada	Luguelín Santos; Dominican Republic	Lalonde Gordon; Trinidad and Tobago
800 metres	David Rudisha; Kenya	Nijel Amos; Botswana	Timothy Kitum; Kenya
1500 metres	Taoufik Makhloufi; Algeria	Leonel Manzano; United States	Abdalaati Iguider; Morocco
5000 metres	Mo Farah; Great Britain	Dejen Gebremeskel; Ethiopia	Thomas Pkemei Longosiwa; Kenya
10,000 metres	Mo Farah; Great Britain	Galen Rupp; United States	Tariku Bekele; Ethiopia
110 metres hurdles	Aries Merritt; United States	Jason Richardson; United States	Hansle Parchment; Jamaica
400 metres hurdles	Félix Sánchez; Dominican Republic	Michael Tinsley; United States	Javier Culson Pérez; Puerto Rico
3000 metres steeplechase	Ezekiel Kemboi Cheboi; Kenya	Mahiedine Mekhissi-Benabbad; France	Abel Kiprop Mutai; Kenya
4 × 100 metres relay	Jamaica; Nesta Carter; Michael Frater; Yohan Blake; Usain Bolt; Kemar Bailey-Cole*	Trinidad and Tobago; Keston Bledman; Marc Burns; Emmanuel Callender; Richard Thompson	France; Jimmy Vicaut; Christophe Lemaitre; Pierre-Alexis Pessonneaux; Ronald Pognon
4 × 400 metres relay	Bahamas; Chris Brown; Demetrius Pinder; Michael Mathieu; Ramon Miller	United States; Bryshon Nellum; Joshua Mance; Tony McQuay; Angelo Taylor; Manteo Mitchell*	Trinidad and Tobago; Lalonde Gordon; Jarrin Solomon; Ade Alleyne-Forte; Deon Lendore
Marathon	Stephen Kiprotich; Uganda	Abel Kirui; Kenya	Wilson Kipsang Kiprotich; Kenya
20 kilometres walk	Chen Ding; China	Erick Barrondo; Guatemala	Wang Zhen; China
50 kilometres walk	Jared Tallent; Australia	Si Tianfeng; China	Robert Heffernan; Ireland
High jump	Erik Kynard; United States	Mutaz Essa Barshim; Qatar; Derek Drouin; Canada; Robert Grabarz; Great Britain	None
Pole vault	Renaud Lavillenie; France	Björn Otto; Germany	Raphael Holzdeppe; Germany
Long jump	Greg Rutherford; Great Britain	Mitchell Watt; Australia	Will Claye; United States
Triple jump	Christian Taylor; United States	Will Claye; United States	Fabrizio Donato; Italy
Shot put	Tomasz Majewski; Poland	David Storl; Germany	Reese Hoffa; United States
Discus throw	Robert Harting; Germany	Ehsan Haddadi; Iran	Gerd Kanter; Estonia
Hammer throw	Krisztián Pars; Hungary	Primož Kozmus; Slovenia	Koji Murofushi; Japan
Javelin throw	Keshorn Walcott; Trinidad and Tobago	Antti Ruuskanen; Finland	Vítězslav Veselý; Czech Republic
Decathlon	Ashton Eaton; United States	Trey Hardee; United States	Leonel Suárez; Cuba

=== Women's events ===
Games	Gold	Silver	Bronze
100 metres	Shelly-Ann Fraser-Pryce; Jamaica	Carmelita Jeter; United States	Veronica Campbell-Brown; Jamaica
200 metres	Allyson Felix; United States	Shelly-Ann Fraser-Pryce; Jamaica	Carmelita Jeter; United States
400 metres	Sanya Richards-Ross; United States	Christine Ohuruogu; Great Britain	DeeDee Trotter; United States
800 metres	Caster Semenya; South Africa	Pamela Jelimo; Kenya	Alysia Johnson Montaño; United States
1500 metres	Maryam Yusuf Jamal; Bahrain	Abeba Aregawi; Ethiopia	Shannon Rowbury; United States
5000 metres	Meseret Defar Tola; Ethiopia	Vivian Jepkemoi Cheruiyot; Kenya	Tirunesh Dibaba Kenene; Ethiopia
10,000 metres	Tirunesh Dibaba Kenene; Ethiopia	Sally Jepkosgei Kipyego; Kenya	Vivian Jepkemoi Cheruiyot; Kenya
100 metres hurdles	Sally Pearson; Australia	Dawn Harper; United States	Kellie Wells; United States
400 metres hurdles	Lashinda Demus; United States	Zuzana Hejnová; Czech Republic	Kaliese Spencer; Jamaica
3000 metres steeplechase	Habiba Ghribi; Tunisia	Sofia Assefa; Ethiopia	Milcah Chemos Cheywa; Kenya
4 × 100 metres relay	United States; Tianna Madison; Allyson Felix; Bianca Knight; Carmelita Jeter; Jeneba Tarmoh*; Lauryn Williams	Jamaica; Shelly-Ann Fraser-Pryce; Sherone Simpson; Veronica Campbell-Brown; Kerron Stewart; Samantha Henry-Robinson*; Schillonie Calvert	Ukraine; Olesya Povh; Khrystyna Stuy; Mariya Ryemyen; Elyzaveta Bryzgina
4 × 400 metres relay	United States; DeeDee Trotter; Allyson Felix; Francena McCorory; Sanya Richards-Ross; Keshia Baker*; Diamond Dixon	Jamaica; Christine Day; Rosemarie Whyte; Shericka Williams; Novlene Williams-Mills; Shereefa Lloyd	Ukraine; Alina Lohvynenko; Olha Zemlyak; Hanna Yaroshchuk; Nataliya Pyhyda
Marathon	Tiki Gelana; Ethiopia	Priscah Jeptoo; Kenya	Tatyana Arkhipova; Russia
20 kilometres walk	Qieyang Shenjie; China	Liu Hong; China	Lü Xiuzhi; China
High jump	Anna Chicherova; Russia	Brigetta Barrett; United States	Ruth Beitia; Spain
Pole vault	Jenn Suhr; United States	Yarisley Silva; Cuba	Yelena Isinbayeva; Russia
Long jump	Brittney Reese; United States	Yelena Sokolova; Russia	Janay Deloach; United States
Triple jump	Olga Rypakova; Kazakhstan	Caterine Ibargüen; Colombia	Olha Saladukha; Ukraine
Shot put	Valerie Adams; New Zealand	Gong Lijiao; China	Li Ling; China
Discus throw	Sandra Perković; Croatia	Li Yanfeng; China	Yarelys Barrios; Cuba
Hammer throw	Anita Włodarczyk; Poland	Betty Heidler; Germany	Zhang Wenxiu; China
Javelin throw	Barbora Špotáková; Czech Republic	Christina Obergföll; Germany	Linda Stahl; Germany
Heptathlon	Jessica Ennis; Great Britain	Lilli Schwarzkopf; Germany	Austra Skujytė; Lithuania

*Indicates the athlete only competed in the preliminary heats.

- ^{a} The original winner, Nadzeya Ostapchuk of Belarus, was stripped of her gold medal after failing drugs tests. The rest of the competitors were elevated by one position accordingly.
- ^{b} The original silver medalist, Darya Pishchalnikova of Russia, was stripped of her silver medal after failing drugs tests. The rest of the competitors were elevated by one position accordingly.
- ^{c} The original winner, Tatyana Lysenko of Russia, was stripped of her gold medal after failing drugs tests. The rest of the competitors were elevated by one position accordingly.

== Badminton ==
Event	Gold	Silver	Bronze
Men's singles	Lin Dan; China	Lee Chong Wei; Malaysia	Chen Long; China
Men's doubles	China; Fu Haifeng; Cai Yun	Denmark; Mathias Boe; Carsten Mogensen	South Korea; Jung Jae-sung; Lee Yong-dae
Women's singles	Li Xuerui; China	Wang Yihan; China	Saina Nehwal; India
Women's doubles	China; Tian Qing; Zhao Yunlei	Japan; Reika Kakiiwa; Mizuki Fujii	Russia; Valeria Sorokina; Nina Vislova
Mixed doubles	China; Zhang Nan; Zhao Yunlei	China; Ma Jin; Xu Chen	Denmark; Joachim Fischer Nielsen; Christinna Pedersen

== Basketball ==
Event	Gold	Silver	Bronze
Men's team	United States; Tyson Chandler; Kevin Durant; LeBron James; Russell Westbrook; Deron Williams; Andre Iguodala; Kobe Bryant; Kevin Love; James Harden; Chris Paul; Anthony Davis; Carmelo Anthony	Spain; Pau Gasol; Rudy Fernández; Sergio Rodríguez; Juan Carlos Navarro; José Calderón; Felipe Reyes; Víctor Claver; Fernando San Emeterio; Sergio Llull; Marc Gasol; Serge Ibaka; Víctor Sada	Russia; Semyon Antonov; Vitaly Fridzon; Sergey Karasev; Sasha Kaun; Victor Khryapa; Dmitry Khvostov; Andrei Kirilenko; Sergei Monia; Timofey Mozgov; Anton Ponkrashov; Alexey Shved; Evgeny Voronov
Women's team	United States; Lindsay Whalen; Seimone Augustus; Sue Bird; Maya Moore; Angel McCoughtry; Asjha Jones; Tamika Catchings; Swin Cash; Diana Taurasi; Sylvia Fowles; Tina Charles; Candace Parker	France; Isabelle Yacoubou; Endéné Miyem; Clémence Beikes; Sandrine Gruda; Edwige Lawson-Wade; Céline Dumerc; Florence Lepron; Émilie Gomis; Marion Laborde; Élodie Godin; Emmeline Ndongue; Jennifer Digbeu	Australia; Suzy Batkovic; Abby Bishop; Liz Cambage; Kristi Harrower; Lauren Jackson; Rachel Jarry; Kathleen MacLeod; Jenna O'Hea; Samantha Richards; Jennifer Screen; Belinda Snell; Laura Summerton

== Boxing ==
Event	Gold	Silver	Bronze
Men's light flyweight	Zou Shiming; China	Kaeo Pongprayoon; Thailand	Paddy Barnes; Ireland
Men's light flyweight	Zou Shiming; China	Kaeo Pongprayoon; Thailand	David Ayrapetyan; Russia
Men's flyweight	Robeisy Ramírez; Cuba	Tugstsogt Nyambayar; Mongolia	Misha Aloyan; Russia
Men's flyweight	Robeisy Ramírez; Cuba	Tugstsogt Nyambayar; Mongolia	Michael Conlan; Ireland
Men's bantamweight	Luke Campbell; Great Britain	John Joe Nevin; Ireland	Lázaro Álvarez; Cuba
Men's bantamweight	Luke Campbell; Great Britain	John Joe Nevin; Ireland	Satoshi Shimizu; Japan
Men's lightweight	Vasyl Lomachenko; Ukraine	Han Soon-Chul; South Korea	Evaldas Petrauskas; Lithuania
Men's lightweight	Vasyl Lomachenko; Ukraine	Han Soon-Chul; South Korea	Yasniel Toledo; Cuba
Men's light welterweight	Roniel Iglesias; Cuba	Denys Berinchyk; Ukraine	Vincenzo Mangiacapre; Italy
Men's light welterweight	Roniel Iglesias; Cuba	Denys Berinchyk; Ukraine	Uranchimegiin Mönkh-Erdene; Mongolia
Men's welterweight	Serik Sapiyev; Kazakhstan	Fred Evans; Great Britain	Taras Shelestyuk; Ukraine
Men's welterweight	Serik Sapiyev; Kazakhstan	Fred Evans; Great Britain	Andrey Zamkovoy; Russia
Men's middleweight	Ryōta Murata; Japan	Esquiva Falcão Florentino; Brazil	Abbos Atoev; Uzbekistan
Men's middleweight	Ryōta Murata; Japan	Esquiva Falcão Florentino; Brazil	Anthony Ogogo; Great Britain
Men's light heavyweight	Egor Mekhontsev; Russia	Adilbek Niyazymbetov; Kazakhstan	Yamaguchi Falcão Florentino; Brazil
Men's light heavyweight	Egor Mekhontsev; Russia	Adilbek Niyazymbetov; Kazakhstan	Oleksandr Hvozdyk; Ukraine
Men's heavyweight	Oleksandr Usyk; Ukraine	Clemente Russo; Italy	Teymur Mammadov; Azerbaijan
Men's heavyweight	Oleksandr Usyk; Ukraine	Clemente Russo; Italy	Tervel Pulev; Bulgaria
Men's super heavyweight	Anthony Joshua; Great Britain	Roberto Cammarelle; Italy	Magomedrasul Majidov; Azerbaijan
Men's super heavyweight	Anthony Joshua; Great Britain	Roberto Cammarelle; Italy	Ivan Dychko; Kazakhstan
Women's flyweight	Nicola Adams; Great Britain	Ren Cancan; China	Marlen Esparza; United States
Women's flyweight	Nicola Adams; Great Britain	Ren Cancan; China	Mary Kom; India
Women's lightweight	Katie Taylor; Ireland	Sofya Ochigava; Russia	Adriana Araújo; Brazil
Women's lightweight	Katie Taylor; Ireland	Sofya Ochigava; Russia	Mavzuna Chorieva; Tajikistan
Women's middleweight	Claressa Shields; United States	Nadezhda Torlopova; Russia	Li Jinzi; China
Women's middleweight	Claressa Shields; United States	Nadezhda Torlopova; Russia	Marina Volnova; Kazakhstan

== Canoeing ==
=== Slalom ===
Event	Gold	Silver	Bronze
Men's slalom C-1	Tony Estanguet; France	Sideris Tasiadis; Germany	Michal Martikán; Slovakia
Men's slalom C-2	Great Britain; Timothy Baillie; Etienne Stott	Great Britain; David Florence; Richard Hounslow	Slovakia; Pavol Hochschorner; Peter Hochschorner
Men's slalom K-1	Daniele Molmenti; Italy	Vavřinec Hradilek; Czech Republic	Hannes Aigner; Germany
Women's slalom K-1	Émilie Fer; France	Jessica Fox; Australia	Maialen Chourraut; Spain

=== Flatwater ===
Event	Gold	Silver	Bronze
Men's C-1 200 m	Yuriy Cheban; Ukraine	Ivan Shtyl; Russia	Alfonso Benavides; Spain
Men's C-1 1000 m	Sebastian Brendel; Germany	David Cal; Spain	Mark Oldershaw; Canada
Men's C-2 1000 m	Germany; Peter Kretschmer; Kurt Kuschela	Belarus; Aliaksandr Bahdanovich; Andrei Bahdanovich	Russia; Alexey Korovashkov; Ilya Pervukhin
Men's K-1 200 m	Ed McKeever; Great Britain	Saúl Craviotto; Spain	Mark de Jonge; Canada
Men's K-1 1000 m	Eirik Verås Larsen; Norway	Adam van Koeverden; Canada	Max Hoff; Germany
Men's K-2 200 m	Russia; Alexander Dyachenko; Yury Postrigay	Belarus; Vadzim Makhneu; Raman Piatrushenka	Great Britain; Liam Heath; Jon Schofield
Men's K-2 1000 m	Hungary; Rudolf Dombi; Roland Kökény	Portugal; Fernando Pimenta; Emanuel Silva	Germany; Martin Hollstein; Andreas Ihle
Men's K-4 1000 m	Australia; Jacob Clear; David Smith; Tate Smith; Murray Stewart	Hungary; Zoltán Kammerer; Tamás Kulifai; Dániel Pauman; Dávid Tóth	Czech Republic; Josef Dostál; Daniel Havel; Lukáš Trefil; Jan Štěrba
Women's K-1 200 m	Lisa Carrington; New Zealand	Inna Osypenko; Ukraine	Natasa Dusev-Janics; Hungary
Women's K-1 500 m	Danuta Kozák; Hungary	Inna Osypenko; Ukraine	Bridgitte Hartley; South Africa
Women's K-2 500 m	Germany; Tina Dietze; Franziska Weber	Hungary; Natasa Dusev-Janics; Katalin Kovács	Poland; Beata Mikołajczyk; Karolina Naja
Women's K-4 500 m	Hungary; Krisztina Fazekas Zur; Katalin Kovács; Danuta Kozák; Gabriella Szabó	Germany; Tina Dietze; Carolin Leonhardt; Katrin Wagner-Augustin; Franziska Weber	Belarus; Volha Khudzenka; Iryna Pamialova; Nadzeya Papok; Maryna Pautaran

== Cycling ==
=== Road cycling ===
Event	Gold	Silver	Bronze
Men's road race	Alexander Vinokourov; Kazakhstan	Rigoberto Urán; Colombia	Alexander Kristoff; Norway
Women's road race	Marianne Vos; Netherlands	Lizzie Armitstead; Great Britain	Olga Zabelinskaya; Russia
Men's time trial	Bradley Wiggins; Great Britain	Tony Martin; Germany	Chris Froome; Great Britain
Women's time trial	Kristin Armstrong; United States	Judith Arndt; Germany	Olga Zabelinskaya; Russia

=== Track cycling ===
==== Men's ====
Event	Gold	Silver	Bronze
Keirin	Chris Hoy; Great Britain	Maximilian Levy; Germany	Teun Mulder; Netherlands
Keirin	Chris Hoy; Great Britain	Maximilian Levy; Germany	Simon van Velthooven; New Zealand
Omnium	Lasse Norman Hansen; Denmark	Bryan Coquard; France	Ed Clancy; Great Britain
team pursuit	Great Britain; Steven Burke; Ed Clancy; Peter Kennaugh; Geraint Thomas	Australia; Jack Bobridge; Rohan Dennis; Michael Hepburn; Glenn O'Shea	New Zealand; Sam Bewley; Westley Gough; Marc Ryan; Jesse Sergent
individual sprint	Jason Kenny; Great Britain	Grégory Baugé; France	Shane Perkins; Australia
team sprint	Great Britain; Philip Hindes; Chris Hoy; Jason Kenny	France; Grégory Baugé; Michaël D'Almeida; Kévin Sireau	Germany; René Enders; Robert Förstemann; Maximilian Levy

==== Women's ====
Event	Gold	Silver	Bronze
Keirin	Victoria Pendleton; Great Britain	Guo Shuang; China	Lee Wai-sze; Hong Kong
Omnium	Laura Trott; Great Britain	Sarah Hammer; United States	Annette Edmondson; Australia
team pursuit	Great Britain; Dani King; Joanna Rowsell; Laura Trott	United States; Dotsie Bausch; Sarah Hammer; Jennie Reed	Canada; Gillian Carleton; Jasmin Glaesser; Tara Whitten
individual sprint	Anna Meares; Australia	Victoria Pendleton; Great Britain	Guo Shuang; China
team sprint	Germany; Kristina Vogel; Miriam Welte	China; Gong Jinjie; Guo Shuang	Australia; Kaarle McCulloch; Anna Meares

=== Mountain biking ===
Event	Gold	Silver	Bronze
Men's	Jaroslav Kulhavý; Czech Republic	Nino Schurter; Switzerland	Marco Aurelio Fontana; Italy
Women's	Julie Bresset; France	Sabine Spitz; Germany	Georgia Gould; United States

=== BMX ===
Event	Gold	Silver	Bronze
Men's	Māris Štrombergs; Latvia	Sam Willoughby; Australia	Carlos Oquendo; Colombia
Women's	Mariana Pajón; Colombia	Sarah Walker; New Zealand	Laura Smulders; Netherlands

== Diving ==
=== Men's events ===
Games	Gold	Silver	Bronze
3 m springboard	Ilya Zakharov; Russia	Qin Kai; China	He Chong; China
10 m platform	David Boudia; United States	Qiu Bo; China	Tom Daley; Great Britain
synchronized 3 m springboard	China; Luo Yutong; Qin Kai	Russia; Ilya Zakharov; Evgeny Kuznetsov	United States; Troy Dumais; Kristian Ipsen
synchronized 10 m platform	China; Cao Yuan; Zhang Yanquan	Mexico; Iván García; Germán Sánchez	United States; David Boudia; Nicholas McCrory

=== Women's events ===
Games	Gold	Silver	Bronze
3 m springboard	Wu Minxia; China	He Zi; China	Laura Sánchez; Mexico
10 m platform	Chen Ruolin; China	Brittany Broben; Australia	Pandelela Rinong; Malaysia
synchronized 3 m springboard	China; He Zi; Wu Minxia	United States; Kelci Bryant; Abigail Johnston	Canada; Jennifer Abel; Émilie Heymans
synchronized 10 m platform	China; Chen Ruolin; Wang Hao	Mexico; Paola Espinosa; Alejandra Orozco	Canada; Meaghan Benfeito; Roseline Filion

== Equestrian ==
Games	Gold	Silver	Bronze
Individual dressage	Charlotte Dujardin; Great Britain	Adelinde Cornelissen; Netherlands	Laura Bechtolsheimer; Great Britain
Team dressage	Great Britain; Laura Bechtolsheimer; Charlotte Dujardin; Carl Hester	Germany; Helen Langehanenberg; Dorothee Schneider; Kristina Sprehe	Netherlands; Adelinde Cornelissen; Edward Gal; Anky van Grunsven
Individual eventing	Michael Jung; Germany	Sara Algotsson Ostholt; Sweden	Sandra Auffarth; Germany
Team eventing	Germany; Peter Thomsen; Dirk Schrade; Ingrid Klimke; Sandra Auffarth; Michael Jung	Great Britain; William Fox-Pitt; Nicola Wilson; Zara Phillips; Mary King; Kristina Cook	New Zealand; Jonelle Richards; Caroline Powell; Jonathan Paget; Andrew Nicholson; Mark Todd
Individual jumping	Steve Guerdat; Switzerland	Gerco Schröder; Netherlands	Cian O'Connor; Ireland
Team jumping	Great Britain; Scott Brash; Peter Charles; Ben Maher; Nick Skelton	Netherlands; Marc Houtzager; Gerco Schroder; Maikel van der Vleuten; Jur Vrieling	Saudi Arabia; Ramzy Al Duhami; Abdullah Al Saud; Kamal Bahamdan; Abdullah Al Sharbatly

== Fencing ==
=== Men's events ===
Event	Gold	Silver	Bronze
individual épée	Rubén Limardo Gascón; Venezuela	Bartosz Piasecki; Norway	Jung Jin-Sun; South Korea
individual foil	Lei Sheng; China	Alaaeldin Abouelkassem; Egypt	Choi Byung-Chul; South Korea
team foil	Italy; Valerio Aspromonte; Giorgio Avola; Andrea Baldini; Andrea Cassarà	Japan; Suguru Awaji; Kenta Chida; Ryo Miyake; Yuki Ota	Germany; Sebastian Bachmann; Peter Joppich; Benjamin Kleibrink; André Weßels
individual sabre	Áron Szilágyi; Hungary	Diego Occhiuzzi; Italy	Nikolay Kovalev; Russia
team sabre	South Korea; Gu Bon-Gil; Kim Jung-Hwan; Oh Eun-Seok; Won Woo-Young	Romania; Tiberiu Dolniceanu; Rareș Dumitrescu; Alexandru Sirițeanu; Florin Zalomir	Italy; Aldo Montano; Diego Occhiuzzi; Luigi Samele; Luigi Tarantino

=== Women's events ===
Event	Gold	Silver	Bronze
individual épée	Yana Shemyakina; Ukraine	Britta Heidemann; Germany	Sun Yujie; China
team épée	China; Xu Anqi; Li Na; Luo Xiaojuan; Sun Yujie	South Korea; Shin A-Lam; Choi Eun-Sook; Jung Hyo-Jung; Choi In-Jeong	United States; Courtney Hurley; Kelley Hurley; Maya Lawrence; Susie Scanlan
individual foil	Elisa Di Francisca; Italy	Arianna Errigo; Italy	Valentina Vezzali; Italy
team foil	Italy; Elisa Di Francisca; Arianna Errigo; Ilaria Salvatori; Valentina Vezzali	Russia; Inna Deriglazova; Kamilla Gafurzianova; Larisa Korobeynikova; Aida Shanayeva	South Korea; Jung Gil-Ok; Oh Ha-Na; Nam Hyun-Hee; Jeon Hee-Sook
individual sabre	Kim Ji-yeon; South Korea	Sofiya Velikaya; Russia	Olha Kharlan; Ukraine

== Field hockey ==
Event	Gold	Silver	Bronze
Men's team	Germany; Maximilian Müller; Martin Häner; Oskar Deecke; Christopher Wesley; Moritz Fürste; Tobias Hauke; Jan-Philipp Rabente; Benjamin Weß; Timo Weß; Oliver Korn; Christopher Zeller; Max Weinhold; Matthias Witthaus; Florian Fuchs; Philipp Zeller; Thilo Stralkowski	Netherlands; Jaap Stockmann; Klaas Vermeulen; Marcel Balkestein; Wouter Jolie; Roderick Weusthof; Robbert Kemperman; Teun de Nooijer; Sander Baart; Floris Evers; Bob de Voogd; Sander de Wijn; Rogier Hofman; Robert van der Horst; Billy Bakker; Valentin Verga; Mink van der Weerden	Australia; Mark Knowles; Jamie Dwyer; Liam de Young; Simon Orchard; Glenn Turner; Chris Ciriello; Matthew Butturini; Russell Ford; Eddie Ockenden; Joel Carroll; Matthew Gohdes; Tim Deavin; Matthew Swann; Nathan Burgers; Kieran Govers; Fergus Kavanagh
Women's team	Netherlands; Marilyn Agliotti; Merel de Blaeij; Eva de Goede; Maartje Goderie; Ellen Hoog; Kelly Jonker; Kim Lammers; Maartje Paumen; Sophie Polkamp; Joyce Sombroek; Naomi van As; Carlien Dirkse van den Heuvel; Margot van Geffen; Kitty van Male; Caia van Maasakker; Lidewij Welten	Argentina; Luciana Aymar; Noel Barrionuevo; Martina Cavallero; Laura del Colle; Silvina D'Elia; Florencia Habif; Rosario Luchetti; Sofía Maccari; Delfina Merino; Maria Florencia Mutio; Carla Rebecchi; Macarena Rodríguez; Rocío Sanchez Moccia; Mariela Scarone; Daniela Sruoga; Maria Josefina Sruoga	Great Britain; Ashleigh Ball; Laura Bartlett; Crista Cullen; Alex Danson; Hannah Macleod; Emily Maguire; Anne Panter; Helen Richardson; Chloe Rogers; Beth Storry; Sarah Thomas; Georgie Twigg; Laura Unsworth; Kate Walsh; Sally Walton; Nicola White

== Football ==
Event	Gold	Silver	Bronze
Men's team	Mexico; Javier Aquino; Néstor Araujo; Dárvin Chávez; José de Jesús Corona; Javier Cortés; Jorge Enríquez; Marco Fabián; Héctor Herrera; Israel Jiménez; Raúl Jiménez; Hiram Mier; Oribe Peralta; Miguel Ponce; Diego Antonio Reyes; José Antonio Rodríguez; Carlos Salcido; Giovani dos Santos; Néstor Vidrio	Brazil; Alex Sandro; Danilo Luiz da Silva; Gabriel Vasconcelos Ferreira; Paulo Henrique Ganso; Hulk; Juan Jesus; Leandro Damião; Lucas Rodrigues Moura da Silva; Marcelo Vieira; Norberto Murara Neto; Neymar; Oscar; Alexandre Pato; Rafael Pereira da Silva; Rômulo Borges Monteiro; Sandro Raniere; Thiago Silva; Bruno Uvini	South Korea; Lee Beom-Young; Kim Bo-Kyung; Kim Chang-Soo; Park Chu-Young; Ji Dong-Won; Kim Hyun-Sung; Koo Ja-Cheol; Oh Jae-Seok; Park Jong-Woo; Kim Kee-Hee; Hwang Seok-Ho; Yun Suk-Young; Baek Sung-Dong; Jung Sung-Ryong; Ki Sung-Yueng; Nam Tae-Hee; Jung Woo-Young; Kim Young-Gwon
Women's team	United States; Nicole Barnhart; Shannon Boxx; Rachel Buehler; Lauren Cheney; Tobin Heath; Amy LePeilbet; Sydney Leroux; Carli Lloyd; Heather Mitts; Alex Morgan; Kelley O'Hara; Heather O'Reilly; Christie Rampone; Megan Rapinoe; Amy Rodriguez; Becky Sauerbrunn; Hope Solo; Abby Wambach	Japan; Kozue Ando; Miho Fukumoto; Mana Iwabuchi; Azusa Iwashimizu; Ayumi Kaihori; Nahomi Kawasumi; Yukari Kinga; Saki Kumagai; Karina Maruyama; Aya Miyama; Shinobu Ohno; Yūki Ōgimi; Aya Sameshima; Mizuho Sakaguchi; Homare Sawa; Megumi Takase; Asuna Tanaka; Kyoko Yano	Canada; Candace Chapman; Jonelle Filigno; Robyn Gayle; Kaylyn Kyle; Karina LeBlanc; Diana Matheson; Erin McLeod; Carmelina Moscato; Marie-Ève Nault; Kelly Parker; Sophie Schmidt; Desiree Scott; Lauren Sesselmann; Christine Sinclair; Chelsea Stewart; Melissa Tancredi; Brittany Timko; Rhian Wilkinson

== Gymnastics ==
=== Artistic ===
==== Men's events ====
Games	Gold	Silver	Bronze
team all-around	China; Chen Yibing; Feng Zhe; Guo Weiyang; Zhang Chenglong; Zou Kai	Japan; Ryohei Kato; Kazuhito Tanaka; Yusuke Tanaka; Kōhei Uchimura; Koji Yamamuro	Great Britain; Sam Oldham; Daniel Purvis; Louis Smith; Kristian Thomas; Max Whitlock
individual all-around	Kōhei Uchimura; Japan	Marcel Nguyen; Germany	Danell Leyva; United States
floor exercise	Zou Kai; China	Kōhei Uchimura; Japan	Denis Ablyazin; Russia
pommel horse	Krisztián Berki; Hungary	Louis Smith; Great Britain	Max Whitlock; Great Britain
rings	Arthur Zanetti; Brazil	Chen Yibing; China	Matteo Morandi; Italy
vault	Yang Hak-Seon; South Korea	Denis Ablyazin; Russia	Igor Radivilov; Ukraine
parallel bars	Feng Zhe; China	Marcel Nguyen; Germany	Hamilton Sabot; France
horizontal bar	Epke Zonderland; Netherlands	Fabian Hambüchen; Germany	Zou Kai; China

==== Women's events ====
Games	Gold	Silver	Bronze
team all-around	United States; Gabby Douglas; Jordyn Wieber; Aly Raisman; Kyla Ross; McKayla Maroney	Russia; Aliya Mustafina; Viktoria Komova; Ksenia Afanasyeva; Anastasia Grishina; Maria Paseka	Romania; Cătălina Ponor; Larisa Iordache; Diana Bulimar; Sandra Izbașa; Diana Chelaru
individual all-around	Gabby Douglas; United States	Viktoria Komova; Russia	Aliya Mustafina; Russia
vault	Sandra Izbașa; Romania	McKayla Maroney; United States	Maria Paseka; Russia
floor exercise	Aly Raisman; United States	Cătălina Ponor; Romania	Aliya Mustafina; Russia
uneven bars	Aliya Mustafina; Russia	He Kexin; China	Beth Tweddle; Great Britain
balance beam	Deng Linlin; China	Sui Lu; China	Aly Raisman; United States

=== Rhythmic ===
Games	Gold	Silver	Bronze
Group all-around	Russia; Anastasia Bliznyuk; Uliana Donskova; Ksenia Dudkina; Alina Makarenko; Anastasia Nazarenko; Karolina Sevastyanova	Belarus; Maryna Hancharova; Anastasia Ivankova; Nataliya Leshchyk; Aliaksandra Narkevich; Ksenia Sankovich; Alina Tumilovich	Italy; Elisa Blanchi; Romina Laurito; Marta Pagnini; Elisa Santoni; Anzhelika Savrayuk; Andreea Stefanescu
Individual all-around	Yevgeniya Kanayeva; Russia	Daria Dmitrieva; Russia	Liubov Charkashyna; Belarus

=== Trampoline ===
Games	Gold	Silver	Bronze
Men's individual	Dong Dong; China	Dmitry Ushakov; Russia	Lu Chunlong; China
Women's individual	Rosie MacLennan; Canada	Huang Shanshan; China	He Wenna; China

== Handball ==
Event	Gold	Silver	Bronze
Men's team	France; Jérôme Fernandez; Didier Dinart; Xavier Barachet; Guillaume Gille; Bertrand Gille; Daniel Narcisse; Guillaume Joli; Samuel Honrubia; Daouda Karaboué; Nikola Karabatić; Thierry Omeyer; William Accambray; Luc Abalo; Cédric Sorhaindo; Michaël Guigou	Sweden; Mattias Andersson; Mattias Gustafsson; Kim Andersson; Jonas Källman; Magnus Jernemyr; Niclas Ekberg; Dalibor Doder; Jonas Larholm; Tobias Karlsson; Johan Jakobsson; Johan Sjöstrand; Fredrik Petersen; Kim Ekdahl du Rietz; Mattias Zakrisson; Andreas Nilsson	Croatia; Venio Losert; Ivano Balić; Domagoj Duvnjak; Blaženko Lacković; Marko Kopljar; Igor Vori; Jakov Gojun; Zlatko Horvat; Drago Vuković; Damir Bičanić; Denis Buntić; Mirko Alilović; Manuel Štrlek; Ivan Čupić; Ivan Ninčević
Women's team	Norway; Ida Alstad; Karoline Dyhre Breivang; Marit Malm Frafjord; Kari Aalvik Grimsbø; Katrine Lunde Haraldsen; Camilla Herrem; Kari Mette Johansen; Amanda Kurtović; Heidi Løke; Kristine Lunde-Borgersen; Karoline Næss; Tonje Nøstvold; Linn-Kristin Riegelhuth Koren; Linn Jørum Sulland; Gøril Snorroeggen	Montenegro; Sonja Barjaktarović; Anđela Bulatović; Katarina Bulatović; Ana Đokić; Marija Jovanović; Milena Knežević; Suzana Lazović; Majda Mehmedović; Radmila Miljanić; Bojana Popović; Jovanka Radičević; Ana Radović; Maja Savić; Jasna Tošković; Marina Vukčević	Spain; Jessica Alonso; Vanesa Amorós; Macarena Aguilar; Andrea Barnó; Nely Carla Alberto; Elisabet Chávez; Mihaela Ciobanu; Verónica Cuadrado; Patricia Elorza; Beatriz Fernández; Begoña Fernández; Marta Mangué; Carmen Martín; Silvia Navarro; Elisabeth Pinedo

== Judo ==
=== Men's events ===
Event	Gold	Silver	Bronze
Extra-lightweight (60 kg)	Arsen Galstyan; Russia	Hiroaki Hiraoka; Japan	Felipe Kitadai; Brazil
Extra-lightweight (60 kg)	Arsen Galstyan; Russia	Hiroaki Hiraoka; Japan	Rishod Sobirov; Uzbekistan
Half-lightweight (66 kg)	Lasha Shavdatuashvili; Georgia	Miklós Ungvári; Hungary	Masashi Ebinuma; Japan
Half-lightweight (66 kg)	Lasha Shavdatuashvili; Georgia	Miklós Ungvári; Hungary	Cho Jun-Ho; South Korea
Lightweight (73 kg)	Mansur Isaev; Russia	Riki Nakaya; Japan	Sainjargalyn Nyam-Ochir; Mongolia
Lightweight (73 kg)	Mansur Isaev; Russia	Riki Nakaya; Japan	Ugo Legrand; France
Half-middleweight (81 kg)	Kim Jae-Bum; South Korea	Ole Bischof; Germany	Ivan Nifontov; Russia
Half-middleweight (81 kg)	Kim Jae-Bum; South Korea	Ole Bischof; Germany	Antoine Valois-Fortier; Canada
Middleweight (90 kg)	Song Dae-Nam; South Korea	Asley González; Cuba	Ilias Iliadis; Greece
Middleweight (90 kg)	Song Dae-Nam; South Korea	Asley González; Cuba	Masashi Nishiyama; Japan
Half-heavyweight (100 kg)	Tagir Khaybulaev; Russia	Naidangiin Tüvshinbayar; Mongolia	Dimitri Peters; Germany
Half-heavyweight (100 kg)	Tagir Khaybulaev; Russia	Naidangiin Tüvshinbayar; Mongolia	Henk Grol; Netherlands
Heavyweight (+100 kg)	Teddy Riner; France	Aleksandr Mikhailine; Russia	Rafael Silva; Brazil
Heavyweight (+100 kg)	Teddy Riner; France	Aleksandr Mikhailine; Russia	Andreas Tölzer; Germany

=== Women's events ===
Event	Gold	Silver	Bronze
Extra-lightweight (48 kg)	Sarah Menezes; Brazil	Alina Dumitru; Romania	Éva Csernoviczki; Hungary
Extra-lightweight (48 kg)	Sarah Menezes; Brazil	Alina Dumitru; Romania	Charline Van Snick; Belgium
Half-lightweight (52 kg)	An Kum-ae; North Korea	Yanet Bermoy; Cuba	Rosalba Forciniti; Italy
Half-lightweight (52 kg)	An Kum-ae; North Korea	Yanet Bermoy; Cuba	Priscilla Gneto; France
Lightweight (57 kg)	Kaori Matsumoto; Japan	Corina Căprioriu; Romania	Marti Malloy; United States
Lightweight (57 kg)	Kaori Matsumoto; Japan	Corina Căprioriu; Romania	Automne Pavia; France
Half-middleweight (63 kg)	Urška Žolnir; Slovenia	Xu Lili; China	Yoshie Ueno; Japan
Half-middleweight (63 kg)	Urška Žolnir; Slovenia	Xu Lili; China	Gévrise Émane; France
Middleweight (70 kg)	Lucie Décosse; France	Kerstin Thiele; Germany	Yuri Alvear; Colombia
Middleweight (70 kg)	Lucie Décosse; France	Kerstin Thiele; Germany	Edith Bosch; Netherlands
Half-heavyweight (78 kg)	Kayla Harrison; United States	Gemma Gibbons; Great Britain	Audrey Tcheuméo; France
Half-heavyweight (78 kg)	Kayla Harrison; United States	Gemma Gibbons; Great Britain	Mayra Aguiar; Brazil
Heavyweight (+78 kg)	Idalys Ortiz; Cuba	Mika Sugimoto; Japan	Karina Bryant; Great Britain
Heavyweight (+78 kg)	Idalys Ortiz; Cuba	Mika Sugimoto; Japan	Tong Wen; China

== Modern pentathlon ==
Event	Gold	Silver	Bronze
Men's	David Svoboda; Czech Republic	Cao Zhongrong; China	Ádám Marosi; Hungary
Women's	Laura Asadauskaitė; Lithuania	Samantha Murray; Great Britain	Yane Marques; Brazil

== Rowing ==
=== Men's events ===
Games	Gold	Silver	Bronze
single sculls	Mahé Drysdale; New Zealand	Ondřej Synek; Czech Republic	Alan Campbell; Great Britain
double sculls	New Zealand; Nathan Cohen; Joseph Sullivan	Italy; Romano Battisti; Alessio Sartori	Slovenia; Iztok Čop; Luka Špik
quadruple sculls	Germany; Tim Grohmann; Karl Schulze; Lauritz Schoof; Philipp Wende	Croatia; Damir Martin; David Šain; Martin Sinković; Valent Sinković	Australia; Karsten Forsterling; James McRae; Chris Morgan; Daniel Noonan
coxless pair	New Zealand; Hamish Bond; Eric Murray	France; Germain Chardin; Dorian Mortelette	Great Britain; George Nash; Will Satch
coxless four	Great Britain; Alex Gregory; Tom James; Pete Reed; Andrew Triggs Hodge	Australia; James Chapman; Josh Dunkley-Smith; Drew Ginn; Will Lockwood	United States; Charlie Cole; Scott Gault; Glenn Ochal; Henrik Rummel
lightweight double sculls	Denmark; Rasmus Quist Hansen; Mads Rasmussen	Great Britain; Mark Hunter; Zac Purchase	New Zealand; Peter Taylor; Storm Uru
lightweight coxless four	South Africa; Matthew Brittain; Sizwe Ndlovu; John Smith; James Thompson	Great Britain; Chris Bartley; Peter Chambers; Richard Chambers; Rob Williams	Denmark; Jacob Barsøe; Eskild Ebbesen; Morten Jørgensen; Kasper Winther Jørgensen
eight	Germany; Filip Adamski; Eric Johannesen; Andreas Kuffner; Florian Mennigen; Lukas Müller; Maximilian Reinelt; Richard Schmidt; Martin Sauer; Kristof Wilke	Canada; Gabriel Bergen; Jeremiah Brown; Andrew Byrnes; Will Crothers; Douglas Csima; Robert Gibson; Malcolm Howard; Conlin McCabe; Brian Price	Great Britain; Richard Egington; James Foad; Phelan Hill; Matt Langridge; Constantine Louloudis; Alex Partridge; Tom Ransley; Greg Searle; Moe Sbihi

=== Women's events ===
Games	Gold	Silver	Bronze
single sculls	Miroslava Knapková; Czech Republic	Fie Udby Erichsen; Denmark	Kim Crow; Australia
double sculls	Great Britain; Katherine Grainger; Anna Watkins	Australia; Kim Crow; Brooke Pratley	Poland; Magdalena Fularczyk; Julia Michalska
quadruple sculls	Ukraine; Yana Dementyeva; Nataliya Dovgodko; Anastasiya Kozhenkova; Kateryna Tarasenko	Germany; Carina Bär; Britta Oppelt; Julia Richter; Annekatrin Thiele	United States; Natalie Dell; Kara Kohler; Megan Kalmoe; Adrienne Martelli
coxless pair	Great Britain; Helen Glover; Heather Stanning	Australia; Kate Hornsey; Sarah Tait	New Zealand; Juliette Haigh; Rebecca Scown
lightweight double sculls	Great Britain; Katherine Copeland; Sophie Hosking	China; Xu Dongxiang; Huang Wenyi	Greece; Christina Giazitzidou; Alexandra Tsiavou
eight	United States; Erin Cafaro; Caryn Davies; Susan Francia; Esther Lofgren; Elle Logan; Caroline Lind; Meghan Musnicki; Taylor Ritzel; Mary Whipple	Canada; Ashley Brzozowicz; Krista Guloien; Janine Hanson; Darcy Marquardt; Natalie Mastracci; Andréanne Morin; Lauren Wilkinson; Lesley Thompson; Rachelle Viinberg	Netherlands; Chantal Achterberg; Claudia Belderbos; Carline Bouw; Annemiek de Haan; Sytske de Groot; Nienke Kingma; Anne Schellekens; Roline Repelaer van Driel; Jacobine Veenhoven

== Sailing ==
Games	Gold	Silver	Bronze
Men's sailboard	Dorian van Rijsselberghe; Netherlands	Nick Dempsey; Great Britain	Przemysław Miarczyński; Poland
Men's Laser class	Tom Slingsby; Australia	Pavlos Kontides; Cyprus	Rasmus Myrgren; Sweden
Men's Finn class	Ben Ainslie; Great Britain	Jonas Høgh-Christensen; Denmark	Jonathan Lobert; France
Men's 470 class	Australia; Mathew Belcher; Malcolm Page	Great Britain; Stuart Bithell; Luke Patience	Argentina; Lucas Calabrese; Juan de la Fuente
Men's Star class	Sweden; Fredrik Lööf; Max Salminen	Great Britain; Iain Percy; Andrew Simpson	Brazil; Bruno Prada; Robert Scheidt
Women's sailboard	Marina Alabau; Spain	Tuuli Petäjä; Finland	Zofia Klepacka; Poland
Women's Laser Radial class	Xu Lijia; China	Marit Bouwmeester; Netherlands	Evi Van Acker; Belgium
Women's 470 class	New Zealand; Jo Aleh; Polly Powrie	Great Britain; Saskia Clark; Hannah Mills	Netherlands; Lobke Berkhout; Lisa Westerhof
Women's Elliott 6m	Spain; Támara Echegoyen; Ángela Pumariega; Sofía Toro	Australia; Nina Curtis; Olivia Price; Lucinda Whitty	Finland; Silja Lehtinen; Silja Kanerva; Mikaela Wulff
49er class	Australia; Iain Jensen; Nathan Outteridge	New Zealand; Peter Burling; Blair Tuke	Denmark; Peter Lang; Allan Nørregaard

== Shooting ==
=== Men's events ===
Event	Gold	Silver	Bronze
10 m air pistol	Jin Jong-oh; South Korea	Luca Tesconi; Italy	Andrija Zlatić; Serbia
10 m air rifle	Alin Moldoveanu; Romania	Niccolò Campriani; Italy	Gagan Narang; India
25 m rapid fire pistol	Leuris Pupo; Cuba	Vijay Kumar; India	Ding Feng; China
50 m pistol	Jin Jong-oh; South Korea	Choi Young-Rae; South Korea	Wang Zhiwei; China
50 m rifle prone	Sergei Martynov; Belarus	Lionel Cox; Belgium	Rajmond Debevec; Slovenia
50 m rifle three positions	Niccolò Campriani; Italy	Kim Jong-Hyun; South Korea	Matthew Emmons; United States
skeet	Vincent Hancock; United States	Anders Golding; Denmark	Nasser Al-Attiyah; Qatar
trap	Giovanni Cernogoraz; Croatia	Massimo Fabbrizi; Italy	Fehaid Al-Deehani; Kuwait
double trap	Peter Wilson; Great Britain	Håkan Dahlby; Sweden	Vasily Mosin; Russia

=== Women's events ===
Event	Gold	Silver	Bronze
10 m air pistol	Guo Wenjun; China	Céline Goberville; France	Olena Kostevych; Ukraine
10 m air rifle	Yi Siling; China	Sylwia Bogacka; Poland	Yu Dan; China
25 m pistol	Kim Jang-Mi; South Korea	Chen Ying; China	Olena Kostevych; Ukraine
50 m rifle three positions	Jamie Lynn Gray; United States	Ivana Maksimović; Serbia	Adéla Sýkorová; Czech Republic
skeet	Kim Rhode; United States	Wei Ning; China	Danka Barteková; Slovakia
trap	Jessica Rossi; Italy	Zuzana Štefečeková; Slovakia	Delphine Réau; France

== Swimming ==
=== Men's events ===
Games	Gold	Silver	Bronze
50 m freestyle	Florent Manaudou; France	Cullen Jones; United States	César Cielo; Brazil
100 m freestyle	Nathan Adrian; United States	James Magnussen; Australia	Brent Hayden; Canada
200 m freestyle	Yannick Agnel; France	Park Tae-hwan; South Korea	Not awarded (as there was a tie for silver)
200 m freestyle	Yannick Agnel; France	Sun Yang; China	Not awarded (as there was a tie for silver)
400 m freestyle	Sun Yang; China	Park Tae-hwan; South Korea	Peter Vanderkaay; United States
1500 m freestyle	Sun Yang; China	Ryan Cochrane; Canada	Oussama Mellouli; Tunisia
100 m backstroke	Matt Grevers; United States	Nick Thoman; United States	Ryosuke Irie; Japan
200 m backstroke	Tyler Clary; United States	Ryosuke Irie; Japan	Ryan Lochte; United States
100 m breaststroke	Cameron van der Burgh; South Africa	Christian Sprenger; Australia	Brendan Hansen; United States
200 m breaststroke	Dániel Gyurta; Hungary	Michael Jamieson; Great Britain	Ryo Tateishi; Japan
100 m butterfly	Michael Phelps; United States	Chad le Clos; South Africa	Not awarded (as there was a tie for silver)
100 m butterfly	Michael Phelps; United States	Yevgeny Korotyshkin; Russia	Not awarded (as there was a tie for silver)
200 m butterfly	Chad le Clos; South Africa	Michael Phelps; United States	Takeshi Matsuda; Japan
200 m individual medley	Michael Phelps; United States	Ryan Lochte; United States	László Cseh; Hungary
400 m individual medley	Ryan Lochte; United States	Thiago Pereira; Brazil	Kosuke Hagino; Japan
4 × 100 m freestyle relay	France; Yannick Agnel; Alain Bernard; Fabien Gilot; Clément Lefert; Amaury Leveaux; Jérémy Stravius	United States; Nathan Adrian; Ricky Berens; Jimmy Feigen; Matt Grevers; Cullen Jones; Jason Lezak; Ryan Lochte; Michael Phelps	Russia; Sergey Fesikov; Andrey Grechin; Danila Izotov; Yevgeny Lagunov; Nikita Lobintsev; Vladimir Morozov
4 × 200 m freestyle relay	United States; Ricky Berens; Conor Dwyer; Charlie Houchin; Ryan Lochte; Matt McLean; Michael Phelps; Davis Tarwater	France; Yannick Agnel; Grégory Mallet; Clément Lefert; Amaury Leveaux; Jérémy Stravius	China; Dai Jun; Jiang Haiqi; Lü Zhiwu; Li Yunqi; Sun Yang; Hao Yun
4 × 100 m medley relay	United States; Nathan Adrian; Matt Grevers; Brendan Hansen; Cullen Jones; Tyler McGill; Michael Phelps; Nick Thoman; Eric Shanteau	Japan; Takuro Fujii; Ryosuke Irie; Kosuke Kitajima; Takeshi Matsuda; Ryo Tateishi	Australia; Tommaso D'Orsogna; James Magnussen; Brenton Rickard; Christian Sprenger; Hayden Stoeckel; Matt Targett
10 km marathon	Oussama Mellouli; Tunisia	Thomas Lurz; Germany	Richard Weinberger; Canada

=== Women's events ===
Games	Gold	Silver	Bronze
50 m freestyle	Ranomi Kromowidjojo; Netherlands	Aleksandra Gerasimenya; Belarus	Marleen Veldhuis; Netherlands
100 m freestyle	Ranomi Kromowidjojo; Netherlands	Aleksandra Gerasimenya; Belarus	Tang Yi; China
200 m freestyle	Allison Schmitt; United States	Camille Muffat; France	Bronte Barratt; Australia
400 m freestyle	Camille Muffat; France	Allison Schmitt; United States	Rebecca Adlington; Great Britain
800 m freestyle	Katie Ledecky; United States	Mireia Belmonte; Spain	Rebecca Adlington; Great Britain
100 m backstroke	Missy Franklin; United States	Emily Seebohm; Australia	Aya Terakawa; Japan
200 m backstroke	Missy Franklin; United States	Anastasia Zuyeva; Russia	Elizabeth Beisel; United States
100 m breaststroke	Rūta Meilutytė; Lithuania	Rebecca Soni; United States	Satomi Suzuki; Japan
200 m breaststroke	Rebecca Soni; United States	Satomi Suzuki; Japan	Yuliya Yefimova; Russia
100 m butterfly	Dana Vollmer; United States	Lu Ying; China	Alicia Coutts; Australia
200 m butterfly	Jiao Liuyang; China	Mireia Belmonte; Spain	Natsumi Hoshi; Japan
200 m individual medley	Ye Shiwen; China	Alicia Coutts; Australia	Caitlin Leverenz; United States
400 m individual medley	Ye Shiwen; China	Elizabeth Beisel; United States	Li Xuanxu; China
4 × 100 m freestyle relay	Australia; Alicia Coutts; Cate Campbell; Brittany Elmslie; Yolane Kukla; Emily Seebohm; Melanie Schlanger; Libby Trickett	Netherlands; Inge Dekker; Femke Heemskerk; Ranomi Kromowidjojo; Hinkelien Schreuder; Marleen Veldhuis	United States; Natalie Coughlin; Missy Franklin; Jessica Hardy; Lia Neal; Allison Schmitt; Amanda Weir
4 × 200 m freestyle relay	United States; Alyssa Anderson; Missy Franklin; Lauren Perdue; Allison Schmitt; Dana Vollmer; Shannon Vreeland	Australia; Angie Bainbridge; Bronte Barratt; Alicia Coutts; Brittany Elmslie; Blair Evans; Jade Neilsen; Kylie Palmer; Melanie Schlanger	France; Coralie Balmy; Charlotte Bonnet; Ophélie-Cyrielle Étienne; Margaux Farrell; Mylène Lazare; Camille Muffat
4 × 100 m medley relay	United States; Rachel Bootsma; Claire Donahue; Missy Franklin; Jessica Hardy; Breeja Larson; Allison Schmitt; Rebecca Soni; Dana Vollmer	Australia; Alicia Coutts; Brittany Elmslie; Leisel Jones; Melanie Schlanger; Emily Seebohm	Japan; Yuka Kato; Satomi Suzuki; Aya Terakawa; Haruka Ueda
10 km marathon	Éva Risztov; Hungary	Haley Anderson; United States	Martina Grimaldi; Italy

== Synchronized swimming ==
Event	Gold	Silver	Bronze
Duet	Russia; Natalia Ishchenko; Svetlana Romashina	Spain; Ona Carbonell; Andrea Fuentes	China; Huang Xuechen; Liu Ou
Team	Russia; Anastasia Davydova; Mariya Gromova; Natalia Ishchenko; Elvira Khasyanova; Daria Korobova; Alexandra Patskevich; Svetlana Romashina; Angelika Timanina; Alla Shishkina	China; Chang Si; Chen Xiaojun; Huang Xuechen; Jiang Tingting; Jiang Wenwen; Liu Ou; Luo Xi; Wu Yiwen; Sun Wenyan	Spain; Clara Basiana; Alba María Cabello; Ona Carbonell; Margalida Crespí; Andrea Fuentes; Thaïs Henríquez; Paula Klamburg; Irene Montrucchio; Laia Pons

== Table tennis ==
Event	Gold	Silver	Bronze
Men's singles	Zhang Jike; China	Wang Hao; China	Dimitrij Ovtcharov; Germany
Women's singles	Li Xiaoxia; China	Ding Ning; China	Feng Tianwei; Singapore
Men's team	China; Wang Hao; Zhang Jike; Ma Long	South Korea; Oh Sang-Eun; Joo Se-Hyuk; Ryu Seung-Min	Germany; Timo Boll; Dimitrij Ovtcharov; Bastian Steger
Women's team	China; Ding Ning; Guo Yue; Li Xiaoxia	Japan; Ai Fukuhara; Sayaka Hirano; Kasumi Ishikawa	Singapore; Li Jiawei; Feng Tianwei; Wang Yuegu

== Taekwondo ==
=== Men's ===
Games	Gold	Silver	Bronze
Men's Flyweight (58 kg)	Joel González; Spain	Lee Dae-Hoon; South Korea	Aleksey Denisenko; Russia
Men's Flyweight (58 kg)	Joel González; Spain	Lee Dae-Hoon; South Korea	Óscar Muñoz; Colombia
Men's Lightweight (68 kg)	Servet Tazegül; Turkey	Mohammad Bagheri Motamed; Iran	Terrence Jennings; United States
Men's Lightweight (68 kg)	Servet Tazegül; Turkey	Mohammad Bagheri Motamed; Iran	Rohullah Nikpai; Afghanistan
Men's Middleweight (80 kg)	Sebastián Crismanich; Argentina	Nicolás García; Spain	Lutalo Muhammad; Great Britain
Men's Middleweight (80 kg)	Sebastián Crismanich; Argentina	Nicolás García; Spain	Mauro Sarmiento; Italy
Men's Heavyweight (+80 kg)	Carlo Molfetta; Italy	Anthony Obame; Gabon	Robelis Despaigne; Cuba
Men's Heavyweight (+80 kg)	Carlo Molfetta; Italy	Anthony Obame; Gabon	Liu Xiaobo; China

=== Women's ===
Games	Gold	Silver	Bronze
Flyweight (49 kg)	Wu Jingyu; China	Brigitte Yagüe; Spain	Chanatip Sonkham; Thailand
Flyweight (49 kg)	Wu Jingyu; China	Brigitte Yagüe; Spain	Lucija Zaninović; Croatia
Lightweight (57 kg)	Jade Jones; Great Britain	Hou Yuzhuo; China	Marlène Harnois; France
Lightweight (57 kg)	Jade Jones; Great Britain	Hou Yuzhuo; China	Tseng Li-cheng; Chinese Taipei
Middleweight (67 kg)	Hwang Kyung-Seon; South Korea	Nur Tatar; Turkey	Helena Fromm; Germany
Middleweight (67 kg)	Hwang Kyung-Seon; South Korea	Nur Tatar; Turkey	Paige McPherson; United States
Heavyweight (+67 kg)	Milica Mandić; Serbia	Anne-Caroline Graffe; France	Anastasia Baryshnikova; Russia
Heavyweight (+67 kg)	Milica Mandić; Serbia	Anne-Caroline Graffe; France	María Espinoza; Mexico

== Tennis ==
Event	Gold	Silver	Bronze
Men's singles	Andy Murray; Great Britain	Roger Federer; Switzerland	Juan Martín del Potro; Argentina
Men's doubles	United States; Bob Bryan; Mike Bryan	France; Michaël Llodra; Jo-Wilfried Tsonga	France; Julien Benneteau; Richard Gasquet
Women's singles	Serena Williams; United States	Maria Sharapova; Russia	Victoria Azarenka; Belarus
Women's doubles	United States; Serena Williams; Venus Williams	Czech Republic; Andrea Hlaváčková; Lucie Hradecká	Russia; Maria Kirilenko; Nadia Petrova
Mixed doubles	Belarus; Victoria Azarenka; Max Mirnyi	Great Britain; Andy Murray; Laura Robson	United States; Mike Bryan; Lisa Raymond

== Triathlon ==
Event	Gold	Silver	Bronze
Men's individual	Alistair Brownlee; Great Britain	Francisco Javier Gómez Noya; Spain	Jonathan Brownlee; Great Britain
Women's individual	Nicola Spirig; Switzerland	Lisa Nordén; Sweden	Erin Densham; Australia

== Volleyball ==
Event	Gold	Silver	Bronze
Men's indoor	Russia; Nikolay Apalikov; Taras Khtey; Sergey Grankin; Sergey Tetyukhin; Aleksandr Sokolov; Yury Berezhko; Aleksandr Butko; Dmitriy Muserskiy; Dmitriy Ilinikh; Maxim Mikhaylov; Aleksandr Volkov; Alexey Obmochaev	Brazil; Bruno Rezende; Wallace de Souza; Sidão; Leandro Vissotto; Giba; Murilo Endres; Sérgio Santos; Thiago Soares Alves; Rodrigão; Lucas Saatkamp; Ricardo Garcia; Dante Amaral	Italy; Cristian Savani; Luigi Mastrangelo; Simone Parodi; Samuele Papi; Michal Lasko; Ivan Zaytsev; Dante Boninfante; Dragan Travica; Alessandro Fei; Emanuele Birarelli; Andrea Bari; Andrea Giovi
Women's indoor	Brazil; Tandara Caixeta; Jaqueline Carvalho; Sheilla Castro; Fabiana Claudino; Adenízia da Silva; Fabiana de Oliveira; Fernanda Ferreira; Fernanda Garay; Dani Lins; Thaísa Menezes; Paula Pequeno; Natália Pereira	United States; Foluke Akinradewo; Lindsey Berg; Nicole Davis; Tayyiba Haneef-Park; Christa Harmotto; Megan Hodge; Destinee Hooker; Jordan Larson; Tamari Miyashiro; Danielle Scott-Arruda; Courtney Thompson; Logan Tom	Japan; Erika Araki; Yukiko Ebata; Kaori Inoue; Maiko Kano; Saori Kimura; Hitomi Nakamichi; Ai Ōtomo; Saori Sakoda; Yuko Sano; Risa Shinnabe; Yoshie Takeshita; Mai Yamaguchi
Men's beach	Germany; Julius Brink; Jonas Reckermann	Brazil; Alison Cerutti; Emanuel Rego	Latvia; Mārtiņš Pļaviņš; Jānis Šmēdiņš
Women's beach	United States; Misty May-Treanor; Kerri Walsh	United States; Jennifer Kessy; April Ross	Brazil; Juliana Felisberta; Larissa França

== Water polo ==
Event	Gold	Silver	Bronze
Men's team	Croatia; Josip Pavić; Damir Burić; Miho Bošković; Nikša Dobud; Maro Joković; Petar Muslim; Ivan Buljubašić; Andro Bušlje; Sandro Sukno; Samir Barač; Igor Hinić; Paulo Obradović; Frano Vićan	Italy; Stefano Tempesti; Amaurys Pérez; Niccolò Gitto; Pietro Figlioli; Alex Giorgetti; Maurizio Felugo; Massimo Giacoppo; Valentino Gallo; Christian Presciutti; Deni Fiorentini; Matteo Aicardi; Danijel Premuš; Giacomo Pastorino	Serbia; Slobodan Soro; Aleksa Šaponjić; Živko Gocić; Vanja Udovičić; Dušan Mandić; Duško Pijetlović; Slobodan Nikić; Milan Aleksić; Nikola Rađen; Filip Filipović; Andrija Prlainović; Stefan Mitrović; Gojko Pijetlović
Women's team	United States; Tumua Anae; Elizabeth Armstrong; Kami Craig; Annika Dries; Courtney Mathewson; Heather Petri; Kelly Rulon; Melissa Seidemann; Jessica Steffens; Maggie Steffens; Brenda Villa; Lauren Wenger; Elsie Windes	Spain; Marta Bach; Andrea Blas; Ana Copado; Anna Espar; Laura Ester; María García Godoy; Laura López; Lorena Miranda; Ona Meseguer; Matilde Ortiz; Jennifer Pareja; María del Pilar Peña; Roser Tarragó	Australia; Gemma Beadsworth; Victoria Brown; Kate Gynther; Bronwen Knox; Holly Lincoln-Smith; Alicia McCormack; Jane Moran; Glencora Ralph; Melissa Rippon; Sophie Smith; Ashleigh Southern; Rowena Webster; Nicola Zagame

== Weightlifting ==
=== Men's events ===
Event	Gold	Silver	Bronze
56 kg	Om Yun-chol; North Korea	Wu Jingbiao; China	Trần Lê Quốc Toàn; Vietnam
62 kg	Kim Un-Guk; North Korea	Óscar Figueroa; Colombia	Eko Yuli Irawan; Indonesia
69 kg	Lin Qingfeng; China	Triyatno; Indonesia	Kim Myong-hyok; North Korea
77 kg	Lü Xiaojun; China	Lu Haojie; China	Iván Cambar; Cuba
85 kg	Adrian Zieliński; Poland	Kianoush Rostami; Iran	Tarek Yehia; Egypt
94 kg	Saeid Mohammadpour; Iran	Kim Min-jae; South Korea	Tomasz Zieliński; Poland
105 kg	Navab Nassirshalal; Iran	Bartłomiej Bonk; Poland	Ivan Efremov; Uzbekistan
+105 kg	Behdad Salimi; Iran	Sajjad Anoushiravani; Iran	Jeon Sang-guen; South Korea

=== Women's events ===
Event	Gold	Silver	Bronze
48 kg	Wang Mingjuan; China	Hiromi Miyake; Japan	Ryang Chun-Hwa; North Korea
53 kg	Hsu Shu-ching; Chinese Taipei	Citra Febrianti; Indonesia	Iulia Paratova; Ukraine
58 kg	Li Xueying; China	Pimsiri Sirikaew; Thailand	Rattikan Gulnoi; Thailand
63 kg	Christine Girard; Canada	Milka Maneva; Bulgaria	Luz Acosta; Mexico
69 kg	Rim Jong-Sim; North Korea	Anna Nurmukhambetova; Kazakhstan	Ubaldina Valoyes; Colombia
75 kg	Lydia Valentín; Spain	Abeer Abdelrahman; Egypt	Madias Nzesso; Cameroon
+75 kg	Zhou Lulu; China	Tatiana Kashirina; Russia	Jang Mi-ran; South Korea

== Wrestling ==
=== Freestyle ===
Event	Gold	Silver	Bronze
Men's 55 kg	Dzhamal Otarsultanov; Russia	Vladimer Khinchegashvili; Georgia	Yang Kyong-Il; North Korea
Men's 55 kg	Dzhamal Otarsultanov; Russia	Vladimer Khinchegashvili; Georgia	Shinichi Yumoto; Japan
Men's 60 kg	Toghrul Asgarov; Azerbaijan	Besik Kudukhov; Russia	Coleman Scott; United States Yogeshwar Dutt; India
Men's 66 kg	Tatsuhiro Yonemitsu; Japan	Sushil Kumar; India	Liván López; Cuba
Men's 66 kg	Tatsuhiro Yonemitsu; Japan	Sushil Kumar; India	Akzhurek Tanatarov; Kazakhstan
Men's 74 kg	Jordan Burroughs; United States	Sadegh Goudarzi; Iran	Gábor Hatos; Hungary
Men's 74 kg	Jordan Burroughs; United States	Sadegh Goudarzi; Iran	Denis Tsargush; Russia
Men's 84 kg	Sharif Sharifov; Azerbaijan	Jaime Espinal; Puerto Rico	Ehsan Lashgari; Iran
Men's 84 kg	Sharif Sharifov; Azerbaijan	Jaime Espinal; Puerto Rico	Dato Marsagishvili; Georgia
Men's 96 kg	Jacob Varner; United States	Valerii Andriitsev; Ukraine	Khetag Gazyumov; Azerbaijan
Men's 96 kg	Jacob Varner; United States	Valerii Andriitsev; Ukraine	Giorgi Gogshelidze; Georgia
Men's 120 kg	Komeil Ghasemi; Iran	Shared gold	Tervel Dlagnev; United States
Men's 120 kg	Bilyal Makhov; Russia	Shared gold	Daulet Shabanbay; Kazakhstan
Women's 48 kg	Hitomi Obara; Japan	Mariya Stadnik; Azerbaijan	Clarissa Chun; United States
Women's 48 kg	Hitomi Obara; Japan	Mariya Stadnik; Azerbaijan	Carol Huynh; Canada
Women's 55 kg	Saori Yoshida; Japan	Tonya Verbeek; Canada	Yuliya Ratkevich; Azerbaijan
Women's 55 kg	Saori Yoshida; Japan	Tonya Verbeek; Canada	Jackeline Rentería; Colombia
Women's 63 kg	Kaori Icho; Japan	Jing Ruixue; China	Soronzonboldyn Battsetseg; Mongolia
Women's 63 kg	Kaori Icho; Japan	Jing Ruixue; China	Lubov Volosova; Russia
Women's 72 kg	Natalia Vorobieva; Russia	Stanka Zlateva; Bulgaria	Guzel Manyurova; Kazakhstan
Women's 72 kg	Natalia Vorobieva; Russia	Stanka Zlateva; Bulgaria	Maider Unda; Spain

=== Greco-Roman ===
Event	Gold	Silver	Bronze
Men's 55 kg	Hamid Sourian; Iran	Rovshan Bayramov; Azerbaijan	Péter Módos; Hungary
Men's 55 kg	Hamid Sourian; Iran	Rovshan Bayramov; Azerbaijan	Mingiyan Semenov; Russia
Men's 60 kg	Omid Norouzi; Iran	Revaz Lashkhi; Georgia	Zaur Kuramagomedov; Russia
Men's 60 kg	Omid Norouzi; Iran	Revaz Lashkhi; Georgia	Ryūtarō Matsumoto; Japan
Men's 66 kg	Kim Hyeon-Woo; South Korea	Tamás Lőrincz; Hungary	Steeve Guenot; France
Men's 66 kg	Kim Hyeon-Woo; South Korea	Tamás Lőrincz; Hungary	Manuchar Tskhadaia; Georgia
Men's 74 kg	Roman Vlasov; Russia	Arsen Julfalakyan; Armenia	Emin Ahmadov; Azerbaijan
Men's 74 kg	Roman Vlasov; Russia	Arsen Julfalakyan; Armenia	Aleksandr Kazakevič; Lithuania
Men's 84 kg	Alan Khugayev; Russia	Karam Gaber; Egypt	Daniyal Gadzhiyev; Kazakhstan
Men's 84 kg	Alan Khugayev; Russia	Karam Gaber; Egypt	Damian Janikowski; Poland
Men's 96 kg	Ghasem Rezaei; Iran	Rustam Totrov; Russia	Artur Aleksanyan; Armenia
Men's 96 kg	Ghasem Rezaei; Iran	Rustam Totrov; Russia	Jimmy Lidberg; Sweden
Men's 120 kg	Mijaín López; Cuba	Heiki Nabi; Estonia	Johan Eurén; Sweden
Men's 120 kg	Mijaín López; Cuba	Heiki Nabi; Estonia	Rıza Kayaalp; Turkey

== See also ==
- 2012 Summer Olympics medal table
