= Netherlands at the 2012 Summer Olympics =

- Flag of the Netherlands
- IOC code: NED
- NOC: Dutch Olympic Committee*; Dutch Sports Federation
- Website: www.nocnsf.nl (in Dutch)

in London
- Competitors: 175 in 18 sports
- Flag bearers: Dorian van Rijsselberghe (opening); Ranomi Kromowidjojo (closing)
- Medals Ranked 13th: Gold 6 Silver 6 Bronze 8 Total 20

Summer Olympics appearances (overview)
- 1900; 1904; 1908; 1912; 1920; 1924; 1928; 1932; 1936; 1948; 1952; 1956; 1960; 1964; 1968; 1972; 1976; 1980; 1984; 1988; 1992; 1996; 2000; 2004; 2008; 2012; 2016; 2020; 2024

Other related appearances
- 1906 Intercalated Games

The Netherlands competed at the 2012 Summer Olympics in London, United Kingdom, from 27 July to 12 August 2012. Dutch athletes have competed in every Summer Olympic Games, with the exception of the sparsely attended 1904 Summer Olympics in St. Louis and 1956 Summer Olympics in Melbourne (except the equestrian events in Stockholm), which the Netherlands boycotted because of the Soviet invasion of Hungary. The Netherlands National Olympic Committee (Dutch: Nederlands Olympisch Comité * Nederlandse Sport Federatie, NOC*NSF) sent the nation's smallest delegation to the Games since 1988. A total of 175 athletes, 95 men and 80 women, competed in 18 sports.

The Netherlands left London with a total of 20 Olympic medals (6 gold, 6 silver, and 8 bronze), finishing thirteenth in the overall medal standings. Four of these medals were awarded to the team in swimming and equestrian, and three each in cycling and sailing. Four Dutch athletes won more than a single Olympic medal in London. The Netherlands proved successful in team sports in London, as the women's and men's national field hockey teams won gold and silver medals, respectively. For the first time in its history, Netherlands won an Olympic medal in BMX cycling.

Among the nation's medalists were cyclist Marianne Vos, who took her second gold medal, this time in women's road race, windsurfer Dorian van Rijsselberghe, who became the second Dutch man to claim an Olympic title since 1984, and gymnast Epke Zonderland, who won the Netherlands' first ever gold medal in his sport after 84 years. Anky van Grunsven, who won bronze in London, emerged as the greatest equestrian rider in Olympic history, with a total of nine medals (three of them gold). Meanwhile, Ranomi Kromowidjojo became one of the most successful Dutch swimmers in history, with a total of four Olympic medals (including two golds in London), and three Olympic records.

== Medalists ==
Medal	Name	Sport	Event	Date
Gold	Marianne Vos	Cycling	Women's road race	29 July
Gold	Ranomi Kromowidjojo	Swimming	Women's 100 m freestyle	2 August
Gold	Ranomi Kromowidjojo	Swimming	Women's 50 m freestyle	4 August
Gold	Dorian van Rijsselberghe	Sailing	Men's sailboard	7 August
Gold	Epke Zonderland	Gymnastics	Men's horizontal bar	7 August
Gold	Netherlands women's national field hockey team: Marilyn Agliotti; Naomi van As; Merel de Blaeij; Carlien Dirkse van den Heuvel; Margot van Geffen; Maartje Goderie; Eva de Goede; Ellen Hoog; Kelly Jonker; Kim Lammers; Caia van Maasakker; Kitty van Male; Maartje Paumen; Sophie Polkamp; Joyce Sombroek; Lidewij Welten	Field hockey	Women's tournament	10 August
Silver	Inge Dekker; Femke Heemskerk; Ranomi Kromowidjojo; Marleen Veldhuis; Hinkelien Schreuder (heats only)	Swimming	Women's 4 × 100 m freestyle relay	28 July
Silver	Marit Bouwmeester	Sailing	Women's Laser Radial class	6 August
Silver	Marc Houtzager; Gerco Schröder; Maikel van der Vleuten; Jur Vrieling	Equestrian	Team jumping	6 August
Silver	Gerco Schröder	Equestrian	Individual jumping	8 August
Silver	Adelinde Cornelissen	Equestrian	Individual dressage	9 August
Silver	Netherlands men's national field hockey team: Sander Baart; Billy Bakker; Marcel Balkestein; Floris Evers; Rogier Hofman; Robert van der Horst; Tim Jenniskens; Wouter Jolie; Robbert Kempermann; Teun de Nooijer; Jaap Stockmann; Valentin Verga; Klaas Vermeulen; Bob de Voogd; Mink van der Weerden; Roderick Weusthof; Sander de Wijn	Field hockey	Men's tournament	11 August
Bronze	Edith Bosch	Judo	Women's 70 kg	1 August
Bronze	Chantal Achterberg; Claudia Belderbos; Carline Bouw; Sytske de Groot; Annemiek de Haan; Nienke Kingma; Anne Schellekens (cox); Roline Repelaer van Driel; Jacobine Veenhoven	Rowing	Women's eight	2 August
Bronze	Henk Grol	Judo	Men's 100 kg	2 August
Bronze	Marleen Veldhuis	Swimming	Women's 50 m freestyle	4 August
Bronze	Adelinde Cornelissen; Edward Gal; Anky van Grunsven	Equestrian	Team dressage	7 August
Bronze	Teun Mulder	Cycling	Men's keirin	7 August
Bronze	Lobke Berkhout; Lisa Westerhof	Sailing	Women's 470 class	10 August
Bronze	Laura Smulders	Cycling	Women's BMX	10 August

Medals by sport
Sport	1st place, gold medalist(s)	2nd place, silver medalist(s)	3rd place, bronze medalist(s)	Total
Swimming	2	1	1	4
Sailing	1	1	1	3
Field hockey	1	1	0	2
Cycling	1	0	2	3
Gymnastics	1	0	0	1
Equestrian	0	3	1	4
Judo	0	0	2	2
Rowing	0	0	1	1
Total	6	6	8	20

Medals by date
Day	Date	1st place, gold medalist(s)	2nd place, silver medalist(s)	3rd place, bronze medalist(s)	Total
Day 1	28 July	0	1	0	1
Day 2	29 July	1	0	0	1
Day 3	30 July	0	0	0	0
Day 4	31 July	0	0	0	0
Day 5	1 August	0	0	1	1
Day 6	2 August	1	0	2	3
Day 7	3 August	0	0	0	0
Day 8	4 August	1	0	1	2
Day 9	5 August	0	0	0	0
Day 10	6 August	0	2	0	2
Day 11	7 August	2	0	2	4
Day 12	8 August	0	1	0	1
Day 13	9 August	0	1	0	1
Day 14	10 August	1	0	2	3
Day 15	11 August	0	1	0	1
Day 16	12 August	0	0	0	0
Total		6	6	8	20

== Competitors ==
NOC*NSF selected a team of 175 athletes (exclusive reserves), 95 men and 80 women, to compete in 18 sports; it was the nation's eighth-largest team sent to the Olympics, but the smallest since 1988. Field hockey was the only team-based sport in which the Netherlands had its representation in these Olympic games. There was only a single competitor in archery, badminton, fencing, shooting, and taekwondo.

The Dutch team featured three defending Olympic champions (dressage rider Anky van Grunsven, the women's freestyle swimming team, and the women's national field hockey team). Van Grunsven, eight-time medalist and the oldest member of the team, at age 44, became the first Dutch female athlete to compete in seven Olympic games. Beach volleyballer Richard Schuil was at his fifth appearance, having participated in the Olympics since the sport's introduction in 1996. Meanwhile, gymnast Céline van Gerner, at age 17, was the youngest athlete of the team. Windsurfer Dorian van Rijsselberghe, who claimed seven World cup titles and a single world championship title for his event, became the Netherlands' flag bearer at the opening ceremony.

Among the Dutch athletes in the team, several of them were born outside the Netherlands. Sprinter Churandy Martina played for two of his previous Olympics under the Netherlands Antilles, which was dissolved in 2010. Two other athletes competed for their respective nations before representing the Netherlands: table tennis player Elena Timina, who made her first two Olympic appearances under the Unified Team and Russia, and field hockey player Marilyn Agliotti, who played for the South African team in Sydney.

Other notable Dutch athletes featured gymnast Epke Zonderland, who called himself "The Flying Dutchman" for his astonishing display in the men's horizontal bar exercises, swimmer and world short course champion Ranomi Kromowidjojo, judokas Edith Bosch and Elisabeth Willeboordse, who both previously won the bronze medal in Beijing, and cyclist Marianne Vos, a former Olympic champion who later competed in the women's road race.

The following is the list of number of competitors participating in the Games:

Sport	Men	Women	Total
Archery	1	0	1
Athletics	10	8	18
Badminton	0	1	1
Cycling	15	10	25
Equestrian	8	3	11
Fencing	1	0	1
Field hockey	17	16	33
Gymnastics	1	2	3
Judo	5	4	9
Rowing	19	13	32
Sailing	5	6	11
Shooting	1	0	1
Swimming	7	8	15
Table tennis	0	3	3
Taekwondo	1	0	1
Tennis	2	0	2
Triathlon	0	2	2
Volleyball	2	4	6
Total	95	80	175

== Archery ==
Netherlands has qualified the following archers.

Athlete	Event	Ranking round		Round of 64	Round of 32	Round of 16	Quarterfinals	Semifinals	Finals / BM	
Athlete	Event	Score	Seed	Opposition Score	Opposition Score	Opposition Score	Opposition Score	Opposition Score	Opposition Score	Rank
Rick van der Ven	Men's individual	671	16	Henckels (LUX) (49); W 6–2	Gankin (KAZ) (17); W 7–1	Im D-h (KOR) (1); W 7–1	Kuo C-w (TPE) (40); W 6–0	Furukawa (JPN) (5); L 5–6	Dai Xx (CHN) (7); L 5–6	4

== Athletics ==
Dutch athletes have so far achieved qualifying standards in the following athletics events (up to a maximum of 3 athletes in each event at the 'A' Standard, and 1 at the 'B' Standard):

Key
- Note–Ranks given for track events are within the athlete's heat only
- Q = Qualified for the next round
- q = Qualified for the next round as a fastest loser or, in field events, by position without achieving the qualifying target
- NR = National record
- N/A = Round not applicable for the event
- Bye = Athlete not required to compete in round

Men
Track & road events

Athlete	Event	Heat		Quarterfinal		Semifinal		Final	
Athlete	Event	Result	Rank	Result	Rank	Result	Rank	Result	Rank
Robert Lathouwers	800 m	1:46.06	2 Q	—N/a		1:45.85	5	Did not advance	
Churandy Martina	100 m	Bye		10.20	3 Q	9.91	2 Q	9.94	6
Churandy Martina	200 m	20.58	1 Q	—N/a		20.17	1 Q	20.00	5
Gregory Sedoc	110 m hurdles	13.52	3 Q	—N/a		DNF		Did not advance	
Giovanni Codrington; Brian Mariano; Churandy Martina; Patrick van Luijk	4 × 100 m relay*	38.29	3 Q	—N/a				38.39	6

* Wouter Brus and Jerrel Feller were reserves for the 4 × 100 m relay, but did not compete.

Field events

Athlete	Event	Qualification		Final	
Athlete	Event	Distance	Position	Distance	Position
Erik Cadée	Discus throw	63.55	12 q	62.78	10
Rutger Smith	Discus throw	63.09	16	Did not advance	
Rutger Smith	Shot put	20.08	14	Did not advance	

Combined events – Decathlon

Athlete	Event	100 m	LJ	SP	HJ	400 m	110H	DT	PV	JT	1500 m	Final	Rank
Eelco Sintnicolaas	Result	10.85	7.37	14.18	1.93	48.85	14.43	32.26	5.30	58.82	4:31.17	8034	11
Eelco Sintnicolaas	Points	894	903	739	740	868	920	509	1004	720	737	8034	11
Ingmar Vos	Result	10.98	7.27	13.77	1.96	49.62	14.61	42.26	4.50	61.60	4:50.01	7805	21
Ingmar Vos	Points	865	878	714	767	832	897	711	760	762	619	7805	21

Women
Track & road events

Athlete	Event	Heat		Semifinal		Final	
Athlete	Event	Result	Rank	Result	Rank	Result	Rank
Hilda Kibet	Marathon	—N/a				2:28:52	24
Lornah Kiplagat	Marathon	—N/a				DNF	
Dafne Schippers	200 m	DNS		Did not advance			
Eva Lubbers; Jamile Samuel; Dafne Schippers; Kadene Vassell	4 × 100 m relay	42.45	3 Q	—N/a		42.70	6

* Esther Akihary and Marit Dopheide were reserves for the 4 × 100 m relay, but did not compete.

Field events

Athlete	Event	Qualification		Final	
Athlete	Event	Distance	Position	Distance	Position
Monique Jansen	Discus throw	57.50	31	Did not advance	

Combined events – Heptathlon

Athlete	Event	100H	HJ	SP	200 m	LJ	JT	800 m	Final	Rank
Nadine Broersen	Result	13.64	1.86	13.57	25.13	5.94	51.98	2:16.98	6319	12
Nadine Broersen	Points	1030	1054	765	875	831	899	865	6319	12
Dafne Schippers	Result	13.48	1.80	13.67	22.83	6.28	36.63	2:15.52	6324	11
Dafne Schippers	Points	1053	978	772	1096	937	603	885	6324	11

== Badminton ==
Athlete	Event	Group Stage			Elimination	Quarterfinal	Semifinal	Final / BM	
Athlete	Event	Opposition Score	Opposition Score	Rank	Opposition Score	Opposition Score	Opposition Score	Opposition Score	Rank
Jie Yao	Women's singles	Ingólfsdóttir (ISL); W 21–12, 25–23	Stapušaitytė (LTU); W 21–16, 21–7	1 Q	Nehwal (IND); L 14–21, 16–21	Did not advance			

== Cycling ==
Netherlands has so far qualified cyclists for the following events.

=== Road ===
Men

Athlete	Event	Time	Rank
Lars Boom	Road race	5:46:05	11
Lars Boom	Time trial	55:29	22
Robert Gesink	Road race	5:46:05	23
Sebastian Langeveld	Road race	5:46:37	74
Niki Terpstra	Road race	5:46:37	82
Lieuwe Westra	Road race	5:46:47	97
Lieuwe Westra	Time trial	54:19	11

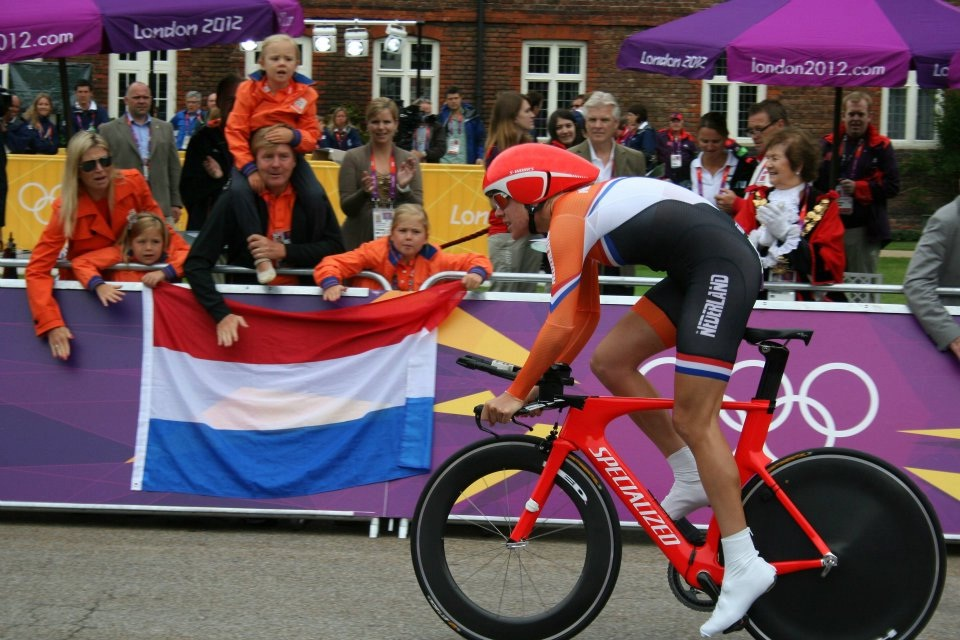
Ellen van Dijk during the time trial supported by the Dutch royal family (Prince Willem-Alexander, Princess Maxima, Princess Catharina-Amalia, Princess Alexia and Princess Ariane).

Women

Athlete	Event	Time	Rank
Loes Gunnewijk	Road race	OTL	
Ellen van Dijk	Road race	OTL	
Ellen van Dijk	Time trial	38:53	8
Annemiek van Vleuten	Road race	3:35:56	14
Marianne Vos	Road race	3:35:29	1st place, gold medalist(s)
Marianne Vos	Time trial	40:40	16

=== Track ===
Sprint

Athlete	Event	Qualification		Round 1	Repechage 1	Round 2	Repechage 2	Quarterfinals	Semifinals	Final	
Athlete	Event	Time Speed (km/h)	Rank	Opposition Time Speed (km/h)	Opposition Time Speed (km/h)	Opposition Time Speed (km/h)	Opposition Time Speed (km/h)	Opposition Time Speed (km/h)	Opposition Time Speed (km/h)	Opposition Time Speed (km/h)	Rank
Willy Kanis	Women's sprint	11.322; 63.593	11	Krupeckaitė (LTU); L	Cueff (FRA); Larreal (VEN); W 11.643; 61.839	Pendleton (GBR); L	Shulika (UKR); Lee W S (HKG); L	Did not advance		9th place final Lee W S (HKG); Sullivan (CAN); Hansen (NZL); W 11.852	9

Team sprint

Athlete	Event	Qualification		Semifinals		Final	
Athlete	Event	Time Speed (km/h)	Rank	Opposition Time Speed (km/h)	Rank	Opposition Time Speed (km/h)	Rank
Yvonne Hijgenaar; Willy Kanis	Women's team sprint	33.253 OR; 54.130	5 Q	Australia; L 33.090; 54.397	5	Did not advance	

Pursuit

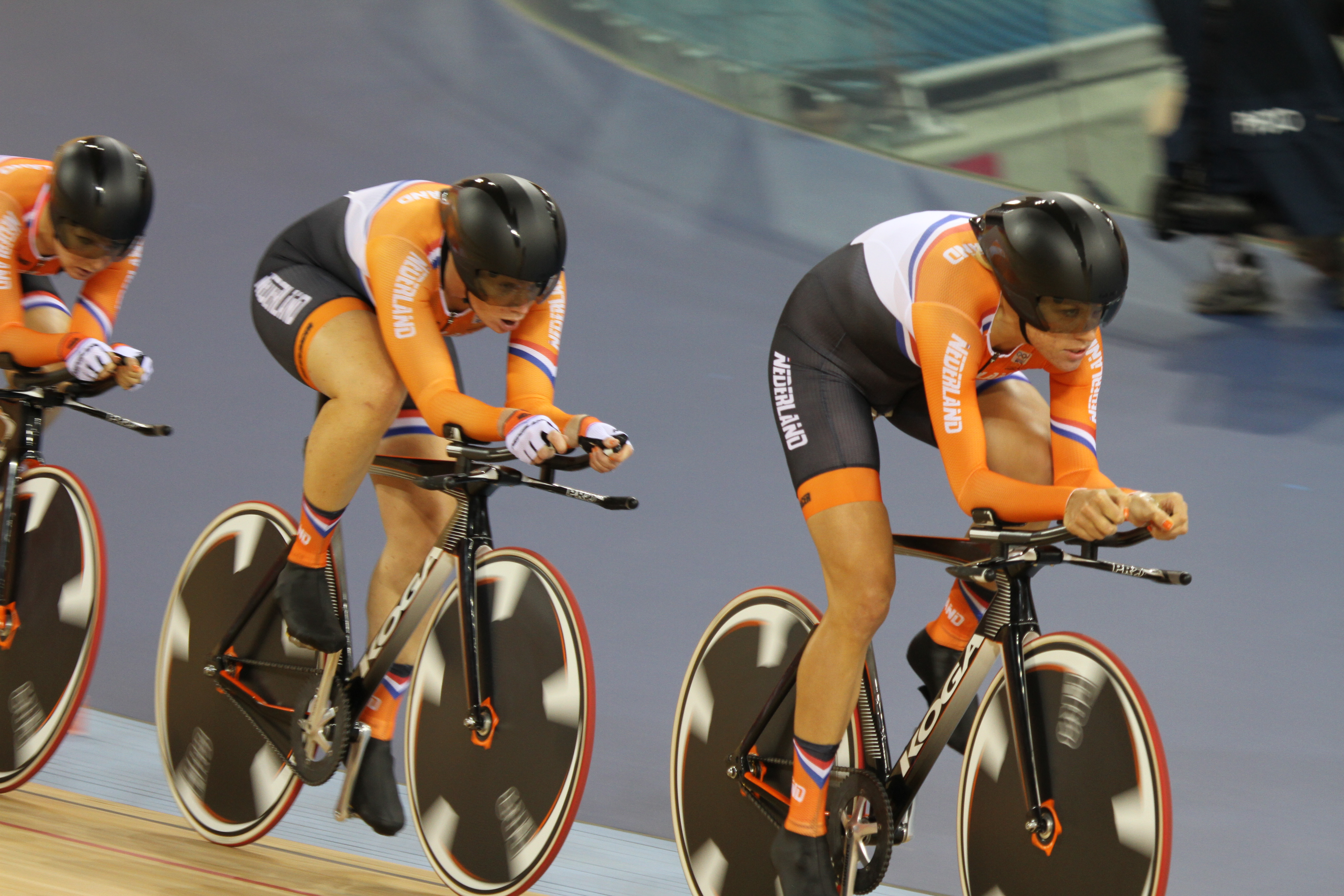
Ellen van Dijk, Kirsten Wild and Amy Pieters riding the women's team pursuit qualification.

Athlete	Event	Qualification		Semifinals		Final	
Athlete	Event	Time	Rank	Opponent Results	Rank	Opponent Results	Rank
Levi Heimans; Jenning Huizenga; Wim Stroetinga; Tim Veldt; Michael Vingerling	Men's team pursuit	4:03.818 NR	8 Q	Russia; 4:04.029	7	Colombia; 4:04.569	7
Vera Koedooder; Amy Pieters; Ellen van Dijk; Kirsten Wild	Women's team pursuit	3:21.602 OR	6 Q	Germany; 3:20.013 NR	6	New Zealand; 3:23.256	6

Keirin

Athlete	Event	1st Round	Repechage	2nd Round	Final
Athlete	Event	Rank	Rank	Rank	Rank
Teun Mulder	Men's keirin	2 Q	Bye	3 Q	3rd place, bronze medalist(s)
Willy Kanis	Women's keirin	6 R	2 Q	4	12

Omnium

Athlete	Event	Flying lap		Points race		Elimination race	Individual pursuit		Scratch race	Time trial		Total points	Rank
Athlete	Event	Time	Rank	Points	Rank	Rank	Time	Rank	Rank	Time	Rank	Total points	Rank
Kirsten Wild	Women's omnium	14.335	4	2	16	5	3:39.741	6	4	37.152	15	50	6

=== Mountain biking ===
Athlete	Event	Time	Rank
Rudi van Houts	Men's cross-country	1:32:53	17
Michael Vingerling	Men's cross-country	DNS	

=== BMX ===
Athlete	Event	Seeding		Quarterfinal		Semifinal		Final	
Athlete	Event	Result	Rank	Points	Rank	Points	Rank	Result	Rank
Raymon van der Biezen	Men's BMX	37.779	1	3	1 Q	8	2 Q	38.492	4
Twan van Gendt	Men's BMX	38.339	3	7	1 Q	8	2 Q	44.744	5
Jelle van Gorkom	Men's BMX	39.529	21	31	7	Did not advance			
Laura Smulders	Women's BMX	39.420	6	—N/a		11	3 Q	38.231	3rd place, bronze medalist(s)

== Equestrian ==
=== Dressage ===
Athlete	Horse	Event	Grand Prix		Grand Prix Special		Grand Prix Freestyle		Overall	
Athlete	Horse	Event	Score	Rank	Score	Rank	Technical	Artistic	Score	Rank
Adelinde Cornelissen	Parzival	Individual	81.687	2 Q	81.968	2 Q	84.107	92.286	88.196	2nd place, silver medalist(s)
Edward Gal	Glock's Undercover	Individual	75.395	11 Q	75.556	10 Q	76.964	83.571	80.267	9
Patrick van der Meer	Uzzo	Individual	70.912	25 Q	67.444	32	Did not advance			
Anky van Grunsven	Salinero	Individual	73.343	16 Q	74.794	12 Q	77.714	86.286	82.000	6
Adelinde Cornelissen; Edward Gal; Anky van Grunsven	See above	Team	76.809	3	77.439	3	—N/a		77.124	3rd place, bronze medalist(s)

=== Eventing ===
Athlete	Horse	Event	Dressage		Cross-country			Jumping						Total	
Athlete	Horse	Event	Dressage		Cross-country			Qualifier			Final			Total	
Athlete	Horse	Event	Penalties	Rank	Penalties	Total	Rank	Penalties	Total	Rank	Penalties	Total	Rank	Penalties	Rank
Andrew Heffernan	Millthyme Corolla	Individual	50.60	34	12.40	63.00	32	12.00	75.00	33	Did not advance			75.00	33
Tim Lips	Concrex Oncarlos	Individual	51.70	39	22.00	73.70	39	13.00	86.70	38	Did not advance			86.70	38
Elaine Pen	Vira	Individual	52.20	43	Eliminated			Did not advance							
Andrew Heffernan; Tim Lips; Elaine Pen	See above	Team	154.50	12	982.20	1136.70	11	25.00	1161.70	11	—N/a			1161.70	11

=== Jumping ===
Athlete	Horse	Event	Qualification								Final					Total	
Athlete	Horse	Event	Round 1		Round 2			Round 3			Round A		Round B			Total	
Athlete	Horse	Event	Penalties	Rank	Penalties	Total	Rank	Penalties	Total	Rank	Penalties	Rank	Penalties	Total	Rank	Penalties	Rank
Marc Houtzager	Sterrehof's Tamino	Individual	0	1 Q	0	0	1 Q	0	0	1 Q	4	11 Q	4	8	9	8	9
Gerco Schröder	London	Individual	0	1 Q	4	4	17 Q	4	8	11 Q	1	7 Q	0	1	2 JO	0	2nd place, silver medalist(s)
Maikel van der Vleuten	Verdi	Individual	0	1 Q	0	0	1 Q	0	0	1 Q	Retired		Did not advance				
Jur Vrieling	Bubalu	Individual	0	1 Q	8	8	31 Q	8	16	33	Did not advance						
Marc Houtzager; Gerco Schröder; Maikel van der Vleuten; Jur Vrieling	See above	Team	—N/a								4	2 Q	4	8	1 JO	4	2nd place, silver medalist(s)

== Fencing ==
Netherlands has qualified 1 fencer.

Men

Athlete	Event	Round of 32	Round of 16	Quarterfinal	Semifinal	Final / BM	
Athlete	Event	Opposition Score	Opposition Score	Opposition Score	Opposition Score	Opposition Score	Rank
Bas Verwijlen	Individual épée	Schwantes (BRA); W 15–10	Fiedler (GER); L 8–15	Did not advance			

== Field hockey ==
=== Men's tournament ===
The following is the Netherlands roster in the men's field hockey tournament of the 2012 Summer Olympics.

Head Coach: Paul van Ass

1. Jaap Stockmann (GK)
3. Tim Jenniskens
4. Klaas Vermeulen
5. Marcel Balkestein
7. Wouter Jolie
8. Billy Bakker
9. Roderick Weusthof
12. Robbert Kemperman
13. Sander Baart
14. Teun de Nooijer
16. Floris Evers (C)
19. Bob de Voogd
20. Sander de Wijn
22. Rogier Hofman
24. Robert van der Horst
26. Valentin Verga
30. Mink van der Weerden

Reserves:

- Pirmin Blaak (GK)

Group play

Pos	Team	Pld	W	D	L	GF	GA	GD	Pts	Qualification
1	Netherlands	5	5	0	0	18	7	+11	15	Semi-finals
2	Germany	5	3	1	1	14	11	+3	10	Semi-finals
3	Belgium	5	2	1	2	8	7	+1	7	Fifth place game
4	South Korea	5	2	0	3	9	8	+1	6	Seventh place game
5	New Zealand	5	1	2	2	10	14	−4	5	Ninth place game
6	India	5	0	0	5	6	18	−12	0	Eleventh place game

Source: FIH

30 July 2012
16:00

Netherlands	3–2	India
Van der Horst 20'; Weusthof 29'; Van der Weerden 51'	Report	D. Singh 45'; Sh. Singh 48'

Umpires:
Tim Pullman (AUS)
Nathan Stagno (GIB)

1 August 2012
10:45

Belgium	1–3	Netherlands
Dekeyser 58'	Report	Van der Weerden 43', 62'; De Voogd 70'

Umpires:
Hamish Jamson (NZL)
Gary Simmonds (RSA)

3 August 2012
10:45

Netherlands	5–1	New Zealand
Weusthof 16'; Van der Weerden 27'; Bakker 29', 56'; Kemperman 67'	Report	Child 5'

Umpires:
Ged Curran (GBR)
Nathan Stagno (GIB)

5 August 2012
16:00

Netherlands	3–1	Germany
De Voogd 14'; De Nooijer 36'; Van der Weerden 41'	Report	Zeller 3'

Umpires:
David Gentles (AUS)
Ged Curran (GBR)

7 August 2012
08:30

South Korea	2–4	Netherlands
Nam 53'; Lee N. 62'	Report	Van der Weerden 17'; Verga 21'; Weusthof 47'; Bakker 64'

Umpires:
Marcin Grochal (POL)
Ged Curran (GBR)

Semi-final

9 August 2012
20:00

Netherlands	9–2	Great Britain
Weusthof 9', 15', 60'; Van der Weerden 22'; Bakker 33', 44', 51'; De Nooijer 47'; Evers 48'	Report	Jackson 18'; Moore 65'

Umpires:
Christian Blasch (GER)
David Gentles (AUS)

Final

11 August 2012
20:00

(gold) Germany	2–1	Netherlands (silver)
Rabente 33', 66'	Report	Van der Weerden 54'

Umpires:
David Gentles (AUS)
Ged Curran (GBR)

=== Women's tournament ===
Roster

The following is the Netherlands roster in the women's field hockey tournament of the 2012 Summer Olympics.

Head Coach: Maximiliano Caldas

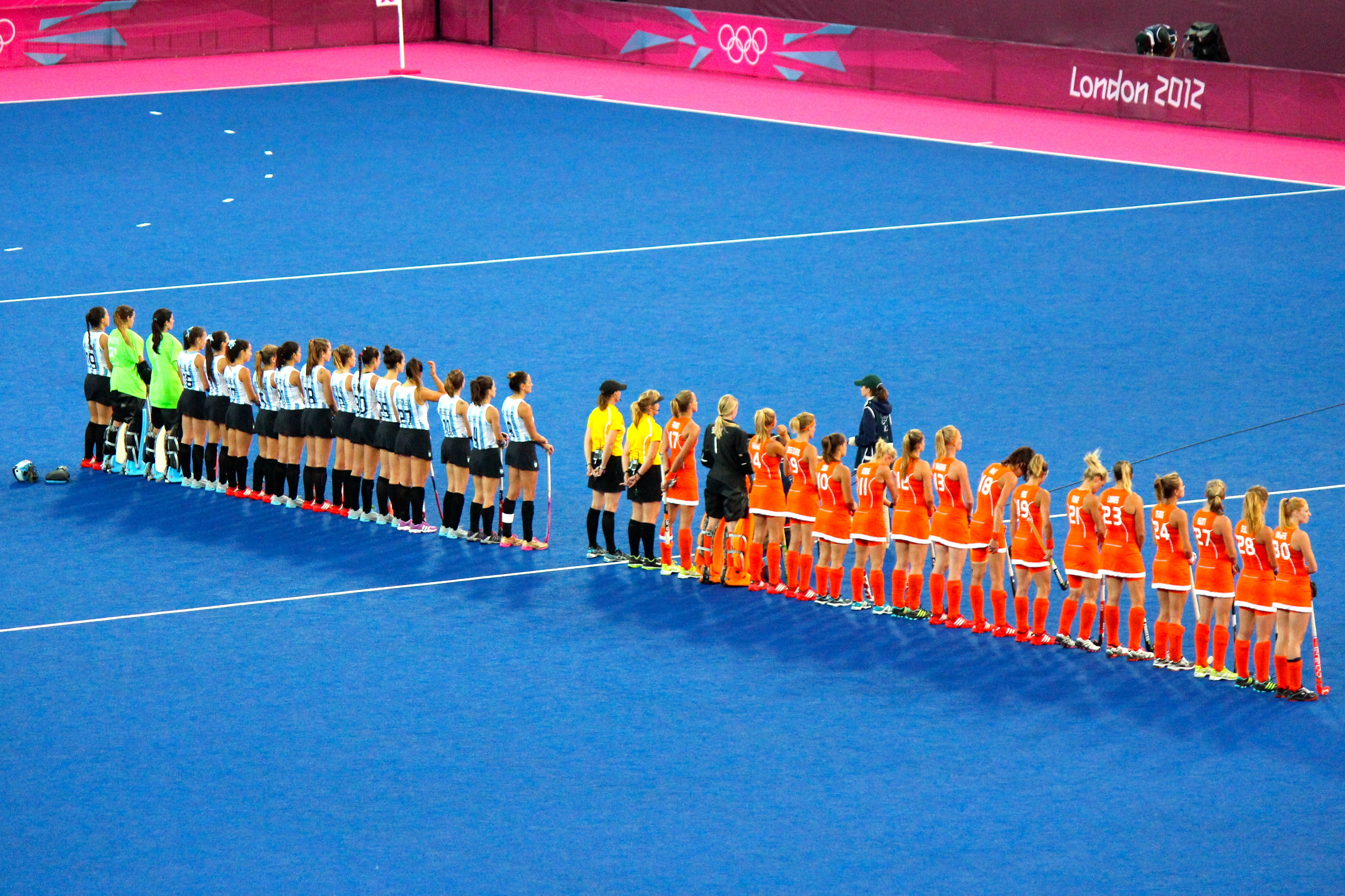
Netherlands women's hockey team (in orange) before the final against Argentina

1. Joyce Sombroek (GK)
4. Kitty van Male
7. ~~Willemijn Bos~~^
9. Carlien Dirkse van den Heuvel
10. Kelly Jonker
11. Maartje Goderie
12. Lidewij Welten
13. Caia van Maasakker
17. Maartje Paumen (C)
18. Naomi van As
19. Ellen Hoog
21. Sophie Polkamp
23. Kim Lammers
24. Eva de Goede
27. Marilyn Agliotti
28. Merel de Blaeij
30. Margot van Geffen

Reserves:

- Floortje Engels (GK)
- Marieke Veenhoven-Mattheussens

^ Willemijn Bos injured her cruciate ligament during a friendly match.

Group play

Pos	Team	Pld	W	D	L	GF	GA	GD	Pts	Qualification
1	Netherlands	5	5	0	0	12	5	+7	15	Semi-finals
2	Great Britain (H)	5	3	0	2	14	7	+7	9	Semi-finals
3	China	5	2	1	2	6	3	+3	7	
4	South Korea	5	2	0	3	9	13	−4	6	
5	Japan	5	1	1	3	4	9	−5	4	
6	Belgium	5	0	2	3	2	10	−8	2	

Source: FIH
Rules for classification: 1) Points; 2) Matches won; 3) Goal difference; 4) Goals for; 5) Head-to-head result.
(H) Hosts

29 July 2012
10:45

Netherlands	3–0	Belgium
Lammers 33', 42' van Maasakker 60'	Report

Umpires:
Claire Adenot (FRA)
Michelle Joubert (RSA)

31 July 2012
08:30

Netherlands	3–2	Japan
Lammers 4', 43'; Hoog 30'	Report	Komazawa 46'; Mitsuhashi 53'

Umpires:
Kang Hyun-young (KOR)
Irene Presenqui (ARG)

2 August 2012
13:45

China	0–1	Netherlands
	Report	Goderie 10'

Umpires:
Michelle Joubert (RSA)
Chieko Soma (JPN)

4 August 2012
10:45

Netherlands	3–2	South Korea
Welten 10'; Hoog 14'; Dirkse van den Heuvel 36'	Report	Cheon Seul-ki 5', 65'

Umpires:
Irene Presenqui (ARG)
Claire Adenot (FRA)

6 August 2012
19:00

Great Britain	1–2	Netherlands
Cullen 29'	Report	van As 43' van Male 52'

Umpires:
Carolina de la Fuente (ARG)
Chieko Soma (JPN)

Semi-final

8 August 2012
15:30

Netherlands	2–2 (a.e.t.)	New Zealand
Paumen 32', 53'	Report	Sharland 7'; Forgesson 49'
Penalties
Van As (penalty shoot-out scored); Paumen (penalty shoot-out missed); De Goede (penalty shoot-out scored); Van Geffen (penalty shoot-out missed); Hoog (penalty shoot-out scored)	3–1	(penalty shoot-out missed) Sharland; (penalty shoot-out scored) Michelsen; (penalty shoot-out missed) Flynn; (penalty shoot-out missed) Punt

Umpires:
Soledad Iparraguirre (ARG)
Julie Ashton-Lucy (AUS)

Final

10 August 2012
20:00

(gold) Netherlands	2–0	Argentina (silver)
Dirkse van den Heuvel 45'; Paumen 54'	Report 1 Report 2

Umpires:
Julie Ashton-Lucy (AUS)
Lisa Roach (AUS)

== Gymnastics ==
=== Artistic ===
Men

Athlete	Event	Qualification								Final							
Athlete	Event	Apparatus						Total	Rank	Apparatus						Total	Rank
Athlete	Event	F	PH	R	V	PB	HB	Total	Rank	F	PH	R	V	PB	HB	Total	Rank
Epke Zonderland	Parallel bars	—N/a				15.133	—N/a	15.133	18	Did not advance							
Epke Zonderland	Horizontal bar	—N/a					15.966	15.966	1 Q	—N/a					16.533	16.533	1st place, gold medalist(s)

Women

Athlete	Event	Qualification						Final					
Athlete	Event	Apparatus				Total	Rank	Apparatus				Total	Rank
Athlete	Event	F	V	UB	BB	Total	Rank	F	V	UB	BB	Total	Rank
Céline van Gerner	All-around	12.966	13.700	14.866	14.100	55.632	19 Q	14.000	14.133	14.966	14.133	57.232	12

=== Trampoline ===
Athlete	Event	Qualification		Final	
Athlete	Event	Score	Rank	Score	Rank
Rea Lenders	Women's	98.115	13	Did not advance	

== Judo ==
Netherlands has qualified 9 judokas

Men

Athlete	Event	Round of 64	Round of 32	Round of 16	Quarterfinals	Semifinals	Repechage	Final / BM	
Athlete	Event	Opposition Result	Opposition Result	Opposition Result	Opposition Result	Opposition Result	Opposition Result	Opposition Result	Rank
Jeroen Mooren	−60 kg	Bye	Arshansky (ISR); L 0001–0001	Did not advance					
Dex Elmont	−73 kg	Bye	Nartey (GHA); W 1110–0003	Mendonça (BRA); W 0011–0002	Legrand (FRA); W 1000–0000	Nakaya (JPN); L 0000–0001	Bye	Sainjargal (MGL); L 0002–0011	5
Guillaume Elmont	−81 kg	Bye	Schmitt (FRA); L 0000–0001	Did not advance					
Henk Grol	−100 kg	Bye	Dugasse (SEY); W 1010–0000	Corrêa (BRA); W 0101–0003	Peters (GER); L 0001–0100	Did not advance	Krpálek (CZE); W 1010–0000	Hwang H-T (KOR); W 0100–0000	3rd place, bronze medalist(s)
Luuk Verbij	+100 kg	Bye	Bor (HUN); L 0002–0010	Did not advance					

Women

Athlete	Event	Round of 32	Round of 16	Quarterfinals	Semifinals	Repechage	Final / BM	
Athlete	Event	Opposition Result	Opposition Result	Opposition Result	Opposition Result	Opposition Result	Opposition Result	Rank
Birgit Ente	−48 kg	Bye	Csernoviczki (HUN); L 0001–0000	Did not advance				
Elisabeth Willeboordse	−63 kg	Chammas (LIB); W 0110–0000	Nébié (BUR); W 0100–0000	Xu L (CHN); L 0000–0100	Did not advance	Ueno (JPN); L 0000–0001	Did not advance	7
Edith Bosch	−70 kg	Bye	Conway (GBR); W 0010–0001	Thiele (GER); L 0000–0101	Did not advance	Tachimoto (JPN); W 0011–0002	Hwang Y-S (KOR); W 0011–0011	3rd place, bronze medalist(s)
Marhinde Verkerk	−78 kg	Bye	Ogata (JPN); W 0110–0020	Gibbons (GBR); L 0000–0100	Did not advance	Yang Xl (CHN); W 0000–0000	Aguiar (BRA); L 0000–1000	5

== Rowing ==
The following quota place has been qualified for the Netherlands rowing squad at the Games

Men

Athlete	Event	Heats		Repechage		Semifinals		Final	
Athlete	Event	Time	Rank	Time	Rank	Time	Rank	Time	Rank
Meindert Klem; Nanne Sluis	Pair	6:25.90	3 SA/B	Bye		7:13.77	6 FB	7:05.12	11
Kaj Hendriks; Ruben Knab; Boaz Meylink; Mechiel Versluis	Four	5:55.99	2 SA/B	Bye		6:03.71	5 FA	6:14.78	5
Tim Heijbrock; Roeland Lievens; Tycho Muda; Vincent Muda	Lightweight four	5:52.47	2 SA/B	Bye		6:01.37	5 FA	6:11.39	6
Rogier Blink; Roel Braas; Sjoerd Hamburger; Jozef Klaassen; Olivier Siegelaar; Diederik Simon; Mitchel Steenman; Matthijs Vellenga; Peter Wiersum (cox)	Eight	5:28.99	3 R	5:27.98	3 FA	—N/a		5:51.72	5

Women

Athlete	Event	Heats		Repechage		Semifinals		Final	
Athlete	Event	Time	Rank	Time	Rank	Time	Rank	Time	Rank
Ellen Hogerwerf; Inge Janssen	Double sculls	7:00.10	4 R	7:19.80	5 FB	—N/a		7:29.57	8
Maaike Head; Rianne Sigmond	Lightweight double sculls	7:10.49	4 R	7:19.26	1 SA/B	7:19.31	5 FB	7:20.36	8
Chantal Achterberg; Claudia Belderbos; Carline Bouw; Sytske de Groot; Annemiek de Haan; Nienke Kingma; Anne Schellekens (cox); Roline Repelaer van Driel; Jacobine Veenhoven	Eight	6:18.98	3 R	6:15.36	1 FA	—N/a		6:13.12	3rd place, bronze medalist(s)

Qualification Legend: FA=Final A (medal); FB=Final B (non-medal); FC=Final C (non-medal); FD=Final D (non-medal); FE=Final E (non-medal); FF=Final F (non-medal); SA/B=Semifinals A/B; SC/D=Semifinals C/D; SE/F=Semifinals E/F; QF=Quarterfinals; R=Repechage

== Sailing ==
Netherlands has qualified 1 boat for each of the following events

Men

Athlete	Event	Race											Net points	Final rank
Athlete	Event	1	2	3	4	5	6	7	8	9	10	M*	Net points	Final rank
Dorian van Rijsselberghe	RS:X	1	1	1	3	1	2	1	2	1	~~39~~; ~~DNF~~	1	15	1st place, gold medalist(s)
Rutger van Schaardenburg	Laser	~~33~~	11	14	7	11	14	26	5	19	23	EL	130	14
Pieter-Jan Postma	Finn	5	10	3	4	~~20~~	13	2	2	1	2	10	52	4
Kalle Coster; Sven Coster	470	8	5	19	7	21	~~24~~	9	22	6	8	EL	105	12

Women

Athlete	Event	Race											Net points	Final rank
Athlete	Event	1	2	3	4	5	6	7	8	9	10	M*	Net points	Final rank
Marit Bouwmeester	Laser Radial	~~6~~	3	4	5	6	1	4	3	6	1	4	37	2nd place, silver medalist(s)
Lobke Berkhout; Lisa Westerhof	470	1	8	6	4	2	18	4	3	~~20~~	6	12	64	3rd place, bronze medalist(s)

M = Medal race; EL = Eliminated – did not advance into the medal race;

Match racing

Athlete	Event	Round Robin											Rank	Knockouts			Rank
Athlete	Event	NZL	RUS	FRA	FIN	ESP	DEN	POR	AUS	USA	GBR	SWE	Rank	Q-final	S-final	Final	Rank
Annemieke Bes; Marcelien de Koning; Renée Groeneveld	Elliott 6m	W	L	L	W	L	L	W	L	L	W	L	8 Q	AUS; L (1–3)	Did not advance		8

== Shooting ==
The following quota place has been qualified for the Netherlands shooting squad at the Games;

Men

Athlete	Event	Qualification		Final	
Athlete	Event	Points	Rank	Points	Rank
Peter Hellenbrand	50 m rifle 3 positions	1160	28	Did not advance	
Peter Hellenbrand	50 m rifle prone	588	43	Did not advance	
Peter Hellenbrand	10 m air rifle	596	7 Q	699.8	5

== Swimming ==
Dutch swimmers have achieved qualifying standards in the following events (up to a maximum of 2 swimmers in each event at the Olympic Qualifying Time (OQT), and 1 at the Olympic Selection Time (OST)):

Men

Athlete	Event	Heat		Semifinal		Final	
Athlete	Event	Time	Rank	Time	Rank	Time	Rank
Dion Dreesens	200 m freestyle	1:49.00	27	Did not advance			
Nick Driebergen	100 m backstroke	53.62	6 Q	53.81	10	Did not advance	
Nick Driebergen	200 m backstroke	1:57.29	7 Q	1:57.35	9	Did not advance	
Job Kienhuis	1500 m freestyle	15:03.16	11	—N/a		Did not advance	
Bastiaan Lijesen	100 m backstroke	54.88	23	Did not advance			
Lennart Stekelenburg	100 m breaststroke	1:00.96	20	Did not advance			
Lennart Stekelenburg	200 m breaststroke	2:12.02	18	Did not advance			
Joeri Verlinden	100 m butterfly	52.07	6 Q	51.75	5 Q	51.82	6
Sebastiaan Verschuren	100 m freestyle	48.37	3 Q	48.13	4 Q	47.88	5
Sebastiaan Verschuren	200 m freestyle	1:47.31	11 Q	1:46.95	11	Did not advance	
Dion Dreesens; Nick Driebergen; Bastiaan Lijesen; Lennart Stekelenburg; Joeri Verlinden; Sebastiaan Verschuren	4 × 100 m medley relay	3:33.78	5 Q	—N/a		3:33.46	7

Women

Athlete	Event	Heat		Semifinal		Final	
Athlete	Event	Time	Rank	Time	Rank	Time	Rank
Inge Dekker	100 m butterfly	58.30	10 Q	Withdrew			
Femke Heemskerk	100 m freestyle	54.43	15 Q	54.13	11	Did not advance	
Femke Heemskerk	200 m freestyle	DNS		Did not advance			
Ranomi Kromowidjojo	50 m freestyle	24.51	1 Q	24.07	1 Q	24.05 OR	1st place, gold medalist(s)
Ranomi Kromowidjojo	100 m freestyle	53.66	5 Q	53.05 OR	1 Q	53.00 OR	1st place, gold medalist(s)
Moniek Nijhuis	100 m breaststroke	1:08.31	20	Did not advance			
Sharon van Rouwendaal	100 m backstroke	1:00.61	20	Did not advance			
Sharon van Rouwendaal	200 m backstroke	2:10.60	16 Q	2:09.50	11	Did not advance	
Marleen Veldhuis	50 m freestyle	24.57	2 Q	24.50	3 Q	24.39	3rd place, bronze medalist(s)
Inge Dekker; Femke Heemskerk; Ranomi Kromowidjojo; Hinkelien Schreuder*; Marleen Veldhuis	4 × 100 m freestyle relay	3:37.76	3 Q	—N/a		3:33.79	2nd place, silver medalist(s)
Inge Dekker; Femke Heemskerk*; Ranomi Kromowidjojo; Moniek Nijhuis; Sharon van Rouwendaal	4 × 100 m medley relay	3:59.19	5 Q	—N/a		3:57.28	6

== Table tennis ==
Netherlands has qualified a women's team.

Athlete	Event	Preliminary round	Round 1	Round 2	Round 3	Round 4	Quarterfinals	Semifinals	Final / BM	
Athlete	Event	Opposition Result	Opposition Result	Opposition Result	Opposition Result	Opposition Result	Opposition Result	Opposition Result	Opposition Result	Rank
Li Jiao	Women's singles	Bye			Pesotska (UKR); W 4–0	Samara (ROU); W 4–2	Li Xx (CHN); L 0–4	Did not advance		
Li Jie	Women's singles	Bye			Partyka (POL); W 4–2	Fukuhara (JPN); L 4–3	Did not advance			
Li Jiao; Li Jie; Elena Timina	Women's team	—N/a				Egypt; W 3–0	China; L 0–3	Did not advance		

== Taekwondo ==
Netherlands has qualified 1 athlete.

Athlete	Event	Round of 16	Quarterfinals	Semifinals	Repechage	Bronze Medal	Final	
Athlete	Event	Opposition Result	Opposition Result	Opposition Result	Opposition Result	Opposition Result	Opposition Result	Rank
Tommy Mollet	Men's −80 kg	Abdelrahman (EGY); W 9–8 SDP	Yeremyan (ARM); L 4–6	Did not advance				

== Tennis ==
Athlete	Event	Round of 64	Round of 32	Round of 16	Quarterfinals	Semifinals	Final / BM	
Athlete	Event	Opposition Score	Opposition Score	Opposition Score	Opposition Score	Opposition Score	Opposition Score	Rank
Robin Haase	Men's singles	Gasquet (FRA); L 3–6, 3–6	Did not advance					
Robin Haase; Jean-Julien Rojer	Men's doubles	—N/a	Paes / Vardhan (IND); L 6–7, 6–4, 2–6	Did not advance				

== Triathlon ==
Netherlands has qualified the following athletes.

Athlete	Event	Swim (1.5 km)	Trans 1	Bike (40 km)	Trans 2	Run (10 km)	Total Time	Rank
Maaike Caelers	Women's	20:49	0:44	1:09:41	0:36	35:03	2:06:53	41
Rachel Klamer	Women's	19:27	0:44	1:07:14	0:35	36:59	2:04:59	36

== Volleyball ==
=== Beach ===
Athlete	Event	Preliminary round	Standing	Round of 16	Quarterfinals	Semifinals	Final / BM	
Athlete	Event	Opposition Score	Standing	Opposition Score	Opposition Score	Opposition Score	Opposition Score	Rank
Reinder Nummerdor; Richard Schuil	Men's	Pool E Hernández – Villafañe (VEN); W 2 – 1 (21–18, 17–21, 15–10); Erdmann – Matysik (GER); W 2 – 0 (21–9, 21–16); Pļaviņš – Šmēdiņš (LAT); L 0 – 2 (14–21, 18–21)	2 Q	Bellaguarda – Heuscher (SUI); W 2 – 0 (22–20, 21–15)	Lupo – Nicolai (ITA); W 2 – 0 (21–16, 21–18)	Brink – Reckermann (GER); L 0 – 2 (14–21, 16–21)	Pļaviņš – Šmēdiņš (LAT); L 1 – 2 (21–19, 19–21, 11–15)	4
Sanne Keizer; Marleen van Iersel	Women's	Pool D Baquerizo – Fernández (ESP); L 1 – 2 (21–14, 16–21, 11–15); Kessy – Ross (USA); L 1 – 2 (15–21, 21–12, 8–15); Gallay – Zonta (ARG); W 2 – 0 (21–12, 21–16)	3 Q	May-Treanor – Walsh Jennings (USA); L 0 – 2 (13–21, 12–21)	Did not advance			9
Madelein Meppelink; Sophie van Gestel	Women's	Pool E Antonelli – Antunes (BRA); L 0 – 2 (10–21, 19–21); Bawden – Palmer (AUS); W 2 – 0 (21–19, 21–15); Goller – Ludwig (GER); L 0 – 2 (18–21, 14–21); Lucky Losers; Háječková – Klapalová (CZE); W 2 – 0 (21–17, 21–17)	3 Q	Felisberta – França (BRA); L 0 – 2 (10–21, 17–21)	Did not advance			9

== Sponsors ==
=== National house ===
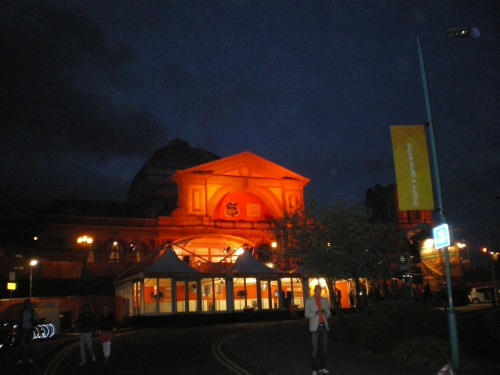
The front of the 2012 Holland Heinken House in Alexandra Palace

The Holland Heineken House in Alexandra Palace was the Dutch meeting place for supporters, athletes and other followers during the 2012 Summer Olympics in London. The Holland Heineken House opened their doors at the day of the opening ceremony on 27 July 2012 and closed on the day of the closing ceremony, 12 August 2012. All Dutch medalists, including the women's road cycling squad (Ellen van Dijk, Loes Gunnewijk and Annemiek van Vleuten) and the belonging coaches, were honoured in Holland Heineken House. Due to the expected numbers of visitors, tickets had to be bought in advance. With about six thousand visitors per day, over one hundred thousand visitors visited the Dutch national home during the Games.

=== Clothes ===
Suitsupply was the official supplier of the 2012 Dutch Olympic team. and was awarded best Olympic outfit by multiple websites, among which was Yahoo Sports.
