= Muda =

Muda or MUDA or MuDA may refer to:

== People ==
- Sultan Muda (1579–1579), nominal Sultan of Aceh
- Tycho Muda (born 1988), Dutch rower
- Vincent Muda (born 1988), Dutch rower

== Places ==
- Muda, Estonia, a village
- Mudá, Spain
- Muda River, Malaysia
- A mountain in Maharashtra, India; see Ghanchakkar

== Organizations ==
- Mysore Urban Development Authority, Karnataka, India
- Mangalore Urban Development Authority, Karnataka, India
- Malaysian United Democratic Alliance, a political party in Malaysia

== Other uses ==
- MuDA, the museum of digital art in Zurich, Switzerland
- Muda (cicada), genus of cicada
- Muda (convoy), a Venetian shipping convoy
- Muda (Japanese term), a Japanese term for "waste" or "useless", as used in lean manufacturing and agile software development
- Muda Institute, an arts school in Ghent, Belgium
- Muda language
- Muda Station, in Ōyodo, Nara, Japan
- Muda Tower or Torre dei Gualandi, a tower in Pisa, Italy
- Muda, battle cry of Dio Brando and Giorno Giovanna, prominent characters in the JoJo's Bizarre Adventure franchise.
