= Vetešník =

Vetešník is a surname. Notable people with the surname include:

- Jan Vetešník (born 1984), Czech rower
- Ondřej Vetešník (born 1984), Czech rower
