= William Newell =

William Newell is the name of:

- William Newell (actor) (1894–1967), American actor
- William A. Newell (1817–1901), American physician and politician, Governor of New Jersey and Washington Territory
- William E. Newell (died 1976), electronics engineer and author
- William Wells Newell (1839–1907), American folklorist
- William Newell (MP) for Clitheroe (UK Parliament constituency)
- William Newell (rower) (born 1988), American rower
