= Fabrice Moreau =

Fabrice Moreau may refer to:

- Fabrice Moreau (footballer) (born 1967), French-Cameroonian footballer
- Fabrice Moreau (rower) (born 1978), French rower
