= Siemion =

The name Siemion may refer to:

As a surname:

- Andrew Siemion (born 1980), American astrophysicist
- Łukasz Siemion (born 1985), Polish rower
- Wojciech Siemion (1928–2010), Polish stage and film actor

As a given name:

- Semyon Budyonny (1883–1973), also spelled Siemion Budionnyi, Soviet cavalryman, military commander, and politician
- Siemion Fajtlowicz (fl. 1967), Polish mathematician

== See also ==
- Simeon
