= Sizwe (given name) =

Sizwe is a South African given name that may refer to

- Sizwe Mabizela, South African academic
- Sizwe Masondo (born 1987), South African cricketer
- Sizwe Motaung (1970–2001), South African football player
- Sizwe Mpofu-Walsh (born 1989), South African author, musician and activist
- Sizwe Ndlovu (born 1980), South African rower
- Sizwe Nxasana (born 1957), South African businessman
- Sizwe Zakho, South African born music producer
