= Zakho (disambiguation) =

Zakho is a city in the Dohuk Governorate of Iraqi Kurdistan in northern Iraq.

Zakho may also refer to:

- Zakho District, which the city is the capital of
- Zakho FC, the city's association football club
- Zakho (Chaldean Diocese), a Chaldean Diocese centred around the city
- University of Zakho, the city's major university
- Sizwe Zakho, South Africa music producer

== See also ==
- Zaku (disambiguation)
