= Sizwe (disambiguation) =

Sizwe is a village in Burma. Sizwe may also refer to

- Sizwe (given name)
- Sizwe Banzi Is Dead, a 1972 play by Athol Fugard
- Umkhonto we Sizwe (Spear of the Nation), armed wing of the African National Congress
- Umkhonto we Sizwe (Spear of the Nation), a 1984 reggae album by Prince Far I
