= Rowing at the 2012 Summer Olympics – Men's lightweight coxless four =

Men's lightweight coxless four at the Games of the XXX Olympiad
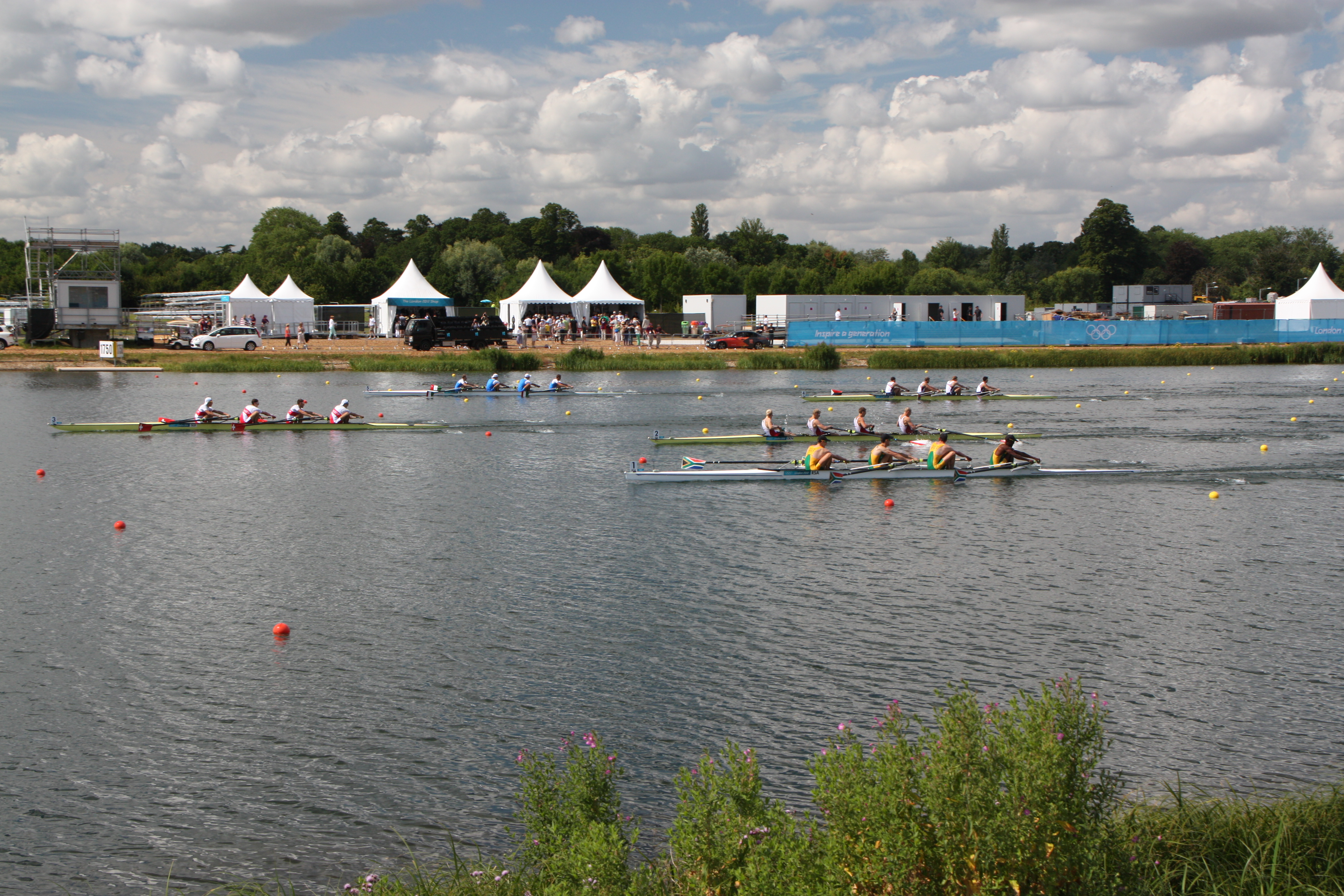
- Switzerland leading in heat 1
- Venue: Dorney Lake
- Date: 28 July – 2 August 2012
- Competitors: 52 from 13 nations
- Winning time: 6:02.84

Medalists
1st place, gold medalist(s)		James Thompson; Matthew Brittain; John Smith; Sizwe Ndlovu	South Africa
2nd place, silver medalist(s)		Peter Chambers; Rob Williams; Richard Chambers; Chris Bartley	Great Britain
3rd place, bronze medalist(s)		Kasper Winther Jørgensen; Morten Jørgensen; Jacob Barsøe; Eskild Ebbesen	Denmark

The men's lightweight coxless four competition at the 2012 Summer Olympics in London took place are at Dorney Lake which, for the purposes of the Games venue, is officially termed Eton Dorney.

== Schedule ==
All times are British Summer Time (UTC+1)

Date	Time	Round
Saturday, 28 July 2012	11:00	Heats
Sunday, 29 July 2012	09:40	Repechage
Tuesday, 31 July 2012	12:40	Semifinals
Thursday 2 August 2012	10:00	Final B
Thursday, 2 August 2012	12:10	Final

== Results ==
=== Heats ===
First three of each heat qualify to the semifinals, remainder goes to the repechage.

==== Heat 1 ====
Rank	Rowers	Country	Time	Notes
1	Schürch, Tramèr, Niepmann, Gyr	Switzerland	5:53.56	Q
2	Thompson, Brittain, Smith, Ndlovu	South Africa	5:54.62	Q
3	Winther, Jørgensen, Barsøe, Ebbesen	Denmark	5:55.64	Q
4	Danesin, Caianiello, Miani, Goretti	Italy	5:56.71	R
5	Fahden, Newell, la Cava, Prendes	United States	6:02.42	R

==== Heat 2 ====
Rank	Rowers	Country	Time	Notes
1	Chambers, Williams, Chambers, Bartley	Great Britain	5:49.29	Q
2	Edwards, Beltz, Cureton, Skipworth	Australia	5:51.18	Q
3	Seibt, Wichert, Kühner, Kühner	Germany	5:52.05	Q
4	Vetešník, Vetešník, Kopač, Vraštil	Czech Republic	5:52.69	R

==== Heat 3 ====
Rank	Rowers	Country	Time	Notes
1	Moutton, Solforosi, Baroukh, Moreau	France	5:50.79	Q
2	Lievens, Heijbrock, Muda, Muda	Netherlands	5:52.47	Q
3	Yu, Huang, Zhang, Wang	China	5:52.58	Q
4	Pawłowski, Siemion, Bernatajtys, Rańda	Poland	5:53.52	R

=== Repechage ===
First three qualify to the semifinals.

Rank	Rowers	Country	Time	Notes
1	Fahden, Newell, la Cava, Prendes	United States	6:00.86	Q
2	Danesin, Caianiello, Miani, Goretti	Italy	6:01.66	Q
3	Vetešník, Vetešník, Kopač, Vraštil	Czech Republic	6:02.23	Q
4	Pawłowski, Siemion, Bernatajtys, Rańda	Poland	6:04.46	

=== Semifinals ===
First three qualify to the final.

==== Semifinal 1 ====
Rank	Rower	Country	Time	Notes
1	Chambers, Williams, Chambers, Bartley	Great Britain	5:59.68	Q
2	Schürch, Tramèr, Niepmann, Gyr	Switzerland	6:00.97	Q
3	Lievens, Heijbrock, Muda, Muda	Netherlands	6:01.37	Q
4	Seibt, Wichert, Kühner, Kühner	Germany	6:02.10	
5	Fahden, Newell, la Cava, Prendes	United States	6:05.06	
6	Vetešník, Vetešník, Kopač, Vraštil	Czech Republic	6:06.85	

==== Semifinal 2 ====
Rank	Rower	Country	Time	Notes
1	Winther, Jørgensen, Barsøe, Ebbesen	Denmark	6:03.53	Q
2	Thompson, Brittain, Smith, Ndlovu	South Africa	6:04.21	Q
3	Edwards, Beltz, Cureton, Skipworth	Australia	6:05.31	Q
4	Moutton, Solforosi, Baroukh, Moreau	France	6:06.90	
5	Danesin, Caianiello, Miani, Goretti	Italy	6:08.44	
6	Yu, Huang, Zhang, Wang	China	6:08.47	

=== Finals ===
==== Final B ====
Rank	Rowers	Country	Time	Notes
1	Moutton, Solforosi, Baroukh, Moreau	France	6:08.37	
2	Fahden, Newell, la Cava, Prendes	United States	6:09.23	
3	Seibt, Wichert, Kühner, Kühner	Germany	6:10.07	
4	Yu, Huang, Zhang, Wang	China	6:11.33	
5	Vetešník, Vetešník, Kopač, Vraštil	Czech Republic	6:11.49	
6	Danesin, Caianiello, Miani, Goretti	Italy	6:14.63	

==== Final A ====
Rank	Rowers	Country	Time	Notes
1st place, gold medalist(s)	Thompson, Brittain, Smith, Ndlovu	South Africa	6:02.84	
2nd place, silver medalist(s)	Chambers, Williams, Chambers, Bartley	Great Britain	6:03.09	
3rd place, bronze medalist(s)	Winther, Jørgensen, Barsøe, Ebbesen	Denmark	6:03.16	
4	Edwards, Beltz, Cureton, Skipworth	Australia	6:04.05	
5	Schürch, Tramèr, Niepmann, Gyr	Switzerland	6:09.30	
6	Lievens, Heijbrock, Muda, Muda	Netherlands	6:11.39	
