= Zaku (disambiguation) =

The Zaku is a fictional model of mecha from the Gundam franchise. It may also refer to:

- Zaku (video game), a 2009 horizontal shooter for the Atari Lynx by Super Fighter Team
- Alhassan Bako Zaku, Nigerian politician
- Zaku Abumi, a character in the Naruto franchise
- Zakho, whose Aramaic name is "Zaku"
- Chaldean Catholic Eparchy of Amadiyah and Zaku, a diocese of the Chaldean Church

== See also ==
- Zakho (disambiguation)
- Mar Zaku, a Zoroastrian god
