= Martin Kühner =

German rower (born 1980)

Medal record

Men's rowing

Representing Germany

World Rowing Championships
Gold medal – first place	2009 Poznań	LM4-
Gold medal – first place	2010 Karapiro	LM8+
Gold medal – first place	2012 Plovdiv	LM8+
Silver medal – second place	2007 Munich	LM2-

Martin Kühner (born 15 October 1980 in Speyer) is a German competitive rower. He has won four medals at the World Rowing Championships with his twin brother Jochen.

== Competitions ==
- 2008 Summer Olympics – Men's lightweight coxless four
- 2012 Summer Olympics – Men's lightweight coxless four
- 2007 World Rowing Championships – LM2- – 2nd
- 2009 World Rowing Championships – LM4- – 1st
- 2010 World Rowing Championships – LM8+ – 1st
- 2012 World Rowing Championships – LM8+ – 1st
- 2009 European Rowing Championships – LM4- – 2nd
- 2010 European Rowing Championships – LM4- – 1st

== See also ==
- Germany at the 2008 Summer Olympics
- Germany at the 2012 Summer Olympics
