= Huang Zhe =

Chinese rower

Personal information
- Nationality: Chinese
- Born: 8 October 1990 (age 34); Huangshi, China

Sport
- Sport: Rowing

Huang Zhe (born 8 October 1990) is a Chinese rower. He competed in the men's lightweight coxless four event at the 2012 Summer Olympics.
