= Nicolas Moutton =

French rower

Personal information
- Born: 15 January 1986 (age 40) Thonon-les-Bains, France

Sport
- Sport: Rowing

Nicolas Moutton (born 15 January 1986) is a French rower. He competed in the Men's lightweight coxless four event at the 2012 Summer Olympics.
