= Anthony Fahden =

American rower

Personal information
- Born: February 27, 1986 (age 40) Berkeley, California, United States

Sport
- Sport: Rowing

Anthony Fahden (born February 27, 1986) is an American rower. He competed in the Men's lightweight coxless four event at the 2012 Summer Olympics.
