= Nicholas la Cava =

American rower

Personal information
- Born: October 24, 1986 (age 39) Weston, Connecticut, United States

Sport
- Sport: Rowing

Nicholas la Cava (born October 24, 1986) is an American rower. He competed in the Men's lightweight coxless four event at the 2012 Summer Olympics.

La Cava attended Phillips Exeter Academy graduated from Columbia University in 2009. He co-founded Chocomize, an online custom chocolate company with two friends from college, Eric Heinbockel and Fabian Kaempfer.
