= Rob Williams (rower, born 1985) =

British rower (born 1985)

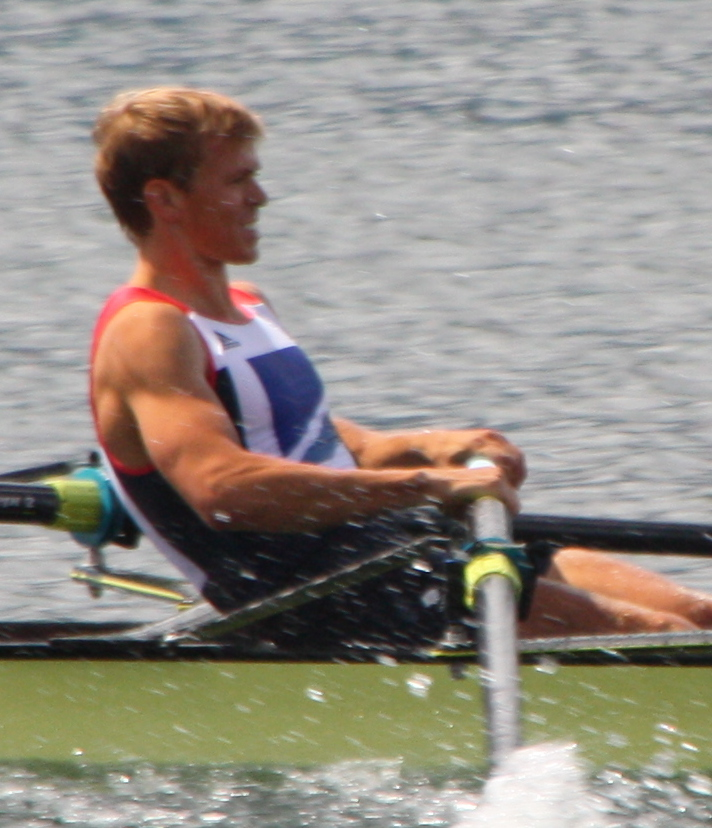
- Rob Williams at the 2012 Summer Olympics

Personal information
- Nationality: British
- Born: 21 January 1985 (age 41) Taplow

Sport
- Club: London Rowing Club
Medal record
Men's rowing
Representing Great Britain
Olympic Games
Silver medal – second place	2012 London	LM4-
World Rowing Championships
Gold medal – first place	2010 Karapiro	LM4-
Bronze medal – third place	2007 Munich	LM4x
Bronze medal – third place	2011 Lake Bled	LM4-

Rob Williams (born 21 January 1985, in Taplow) is a British rower who competed at the 2012 Summer Olympics.

== Rowing career ==
Williams was part of the British squad that topped the medal table at the 2011 World Rowing Championships in Bled, where he won a bronze medal as part of the lightweight coxless four with Richard Chambers, Chris Bartley, and Paul Mattick.

He won a silver medal at the 2012 Olympic Games as part of the men's lightweight four.
