= Matthew Brittain =

South African rower (born 1987)

Personal information
- Born: 5 May 1987 (age 39) Johannesburg, South Africa

Sport
- Sport: Rowing
Medal record
Men's rowing
Representing South Africa
Olympic Games
| Gold medal – first place | 2012 London | Coxless four |

Matthew Brittain (born 5 May 1987) is a South African rower. He won a gold medal in the Men's lightweight coxless four event at the 2012 Summer Olympics, with teammates James Thompson, John Smith and Sizwe Ndlovu.

Subsequently, Matthew Brittain and James Thompson were instrumental in setting up the John Waugh Rock The Boat Regatta Series.
