= William Newell (rower) =

American rower

Personal information
- Born: October 5, 1988 (age 37) Boston, Massachusetts, United States

Sport
- Sport: Rowing
- College team: Harvard University

William Newell (born October 5, 1988) is an American rower. He competed in the Men's lightweight coxless four event at the 2012 Summer Olympics.
