= Fabrice Moreau (rower) =

French rower

Personal information
- Nationality: French
- Born: 11 January 1978 (age 48) Le Creusot, France

Sport
- Country: France
- Sport: Rowing
Medal record
World Championships
Silver medal – second place	2015 Aiguebelette	LM8+

Fabrice Moreau (born 11 January 1978) is a French rower. He competed in the Men's lightweight coxless four event at the 2012 Summer Olympics.
