= MuDA =

- Location: Pfingstweidstrasse 101, Zurich, Switzerland
- Coordinates: 47.3902°N 8.5090°E
- Type: Museum
- Website: muda.co

MuDA was the acronym of the Museum of Digital Art, an art space dedicated to digital arts. The institute was opened in February 2016 in Zurich by the non-profit Digital Arts Association. It closed by the end of June 2020.

== History ==
The MuDA project came into public spotlight in June 2015 when the founders launched a crowd sourcing campaign on Kickstarter to rise the remaining necessary funds to complete the construction works. The initiative was started by Caroline Hirt and Christian Etter, two Swiss citizens and carried out by the Digital Arts Association, also based in Zurich. It opened in February 2016.

== Direction ==
Each exhibition at the MuDA was dedicated to one solo artist or artist collective. It did not stage group or themed exhibitions. According to the MuDA's website is each artists chosen by an algorithm and is given as much freedom as possible to curate their own exhibition apart from two rules: 1. Since the MuDA is a small museum (but not only because of that), its administrators believe in the “less but better” maxim. Exhibitions shouldn’t be a clutter of things. They should instead display a carefully chosen selection of artworks, that will have space to unfold and be experienced. 2. Technology is at its very best when it is invisible. The MuDA doesn’t want to hold exhibitions where the art is only displayed on screens — visitors could just as well enjoy these contents at home. On the contrary, the MuDA encourages physical installations that appeal to multiple sensory organs.

== Building ==
In 1959, the Migros Cooperative, Switzerland’s largest food retailer, bought about 50,000 m2 of land on which was erected, just two years later, one of Switzerland’s first high-rise building, the Herdern Hochhaus. The purpose of the 58-meter tall building was to provide logistics, distribution and storage space for their food delivery chain — including a ripening hall for all the bananas that were dispatched from there to all corners of Switzerland. Due to its industrial historical importance, the building was classified as a listed monument in 2012. That same year, after an internal reorganization, parts of the premises were left empty and a series of vacant spaces were made available for temporary usage.

== Funding ==
The MuDA's construction was partly crowd funded. The campaign raised the total amount of USD 111,111 within 30 days and hence completed the funding. Despite that the exhibition of digital arts requires less resources than conventional art, the MuDA also relies on donations and subsidies to cover its entire budget. Therefore the museum partners up with like-minded technology, engineering and design companies and institutes, as well as applies for art grants to carry out the MuDA’s vision.
