= Ondřej Vetešník =

Czech rower

Personal information
- Born: 5 March 1984 (age 42) Nymburk, Czechoslovakia

Sport
- Country: Czech Republic
- Sport: Rowing
Medal record
Men's rowing
Representing the Czech Republic
European Championships
Bronze medal – third place	2007 Poznań	Lwt double scull

Ondřej Vetešník (Czech pronunciation: [ˈondr̝ɛj ˈvɛtɛʃɲiːk]; born 5 March 1984) is a Czech rower. He competed in the Men's lightweight coxless four event at the 2012 Summer Olympics with his twin Jan.
