= John Smith (South African rower) =

South African rower

Personal information
- Nationality: South African
- Born: 12 January 1990 (age 36) Germiston, South Africa

Sport
- Sport: Rowing
Medal record
Men's rowing
Representing South Africa
Olympic Games
Gold medal – first place	2012 London	Lwt coxless four
World Championships
Gold medal – first place	2014 Amsterdam	Lwt double sculls
World U23 Rowing Championships
Gold medal – first place	2010 Brest	Men's Pair

John Smith (born 12 January 1990) is a South African rower. He won a gold medal in the Men's lightweight coxless four event at the 2012 Summer Olympics, with teammates James Thompson, Matthew Brittain, and Sizwe Ndlovu. In 2014, he won the men's lightweight double sculls with Thompson at the World Championships, setting a world's best time. The pair also competed at the 2016 Summer Olympics.

He also won the World U-23 men's lightweight pair world championship with Lawrence Brittain in 2010, and competed in the men's four at the 2020 Summer Olympics.
