= Timothee Heijbrock =

Dutch rower

Personal information
- Born: 28 October 1985 (age 40) Naarden, Netherlands

Sport
- Sport: Rowing

Timothee Heijbrock (born 28 October 1985) is a Dutch rower. He competed in the Men's lightweight coxless four event at the 2012 Summer Olympics.
