= James Thompson (rower) =

South African rower

Personal information
- Nationality: South African
- Born: 18 November 1986 (age 39) Cape Town, South Africa

Sport
- Sport: Rowing
Medal record
Men's rowing
Representing South Africa
Olympic Games
Gold medal – first place	2012 London	Lwt coxless four
World Championships
Gold medal – first place	2014 Amsterdam	Lwt double sculls

James Thompson (born 18 November 1986) is a South African rower. He attended school at St. Andrew's College, Grahamstown. He joined the Tuks rowing club and received a Sport Sciences degree from the University of Pretoria. Thompson won a gold medal in the Men's lightweight coxless four event at the 2012 Summer Olympics, with teammates John Smith, Matthew Brittain, and Sizwe Ndlovu.

Thompson retired as a professional rower on 4 February 2017 after competing at the Rock the Boat regatta at Roodeplaat Dam. Thompson and Matthew Brittain were instrumental in setting up the John Waugh Rock The Boat Series.
