= Kasper Winther Jørgensen =

Danish rower (born 1985)

Medal record

Men's rowing

Representing Denmark

Olympic Games
Silver medal – second place	2016 Rio de Janeiro	Light coxless four
Bronze medal – third place	2012 London	Light coxless four

World Championships
Gold medal – first place	2013 Chungju	LM4−
Gold medal – first place	2014 Amsterdam	LM4−
Silver medal – second place	2009 Poznań	LM4-
Silver medal – second place	2015 Aiguebelette	LM4−

European Championships
Gold medal – first place	2013 Seville	LM4−
Gold medal – first place	2014 Belgrade	LM4−
Bronze medal – third place	2015 Poznań	LM4−

Kasper Winther Jørgensen (born 21 March 1985, in Copenhagen) is a Danish rower. He competed in the lightweight coxless four at the 2012 Summer Olympics, winning the bronze medal. He was a member of the Gold Four.
