= Łukasz Siemion =

Polish rower

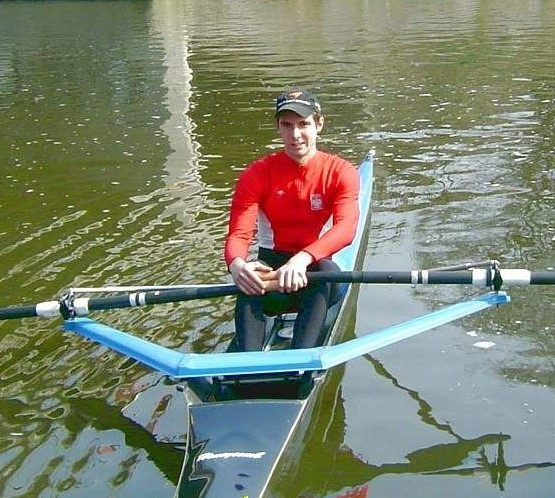
- Łukasz Siemion in 2003.

Personal information
- Born: 12 April 1985 (age 41) Bartoszewice, Poland

Sport
- Sport: Rowing
Medal record
Men's rowing
Representing Poland
European Championships
Silver medal – second place	2010 Montemor-o-Velho	Lightweight coxless four

Łukasz Siemion (born 12 April 1985) is a Polish rower. He competed in the Men's lightweight coxless four event at the 2012 Summer Olympics.
