= Sizwe Ndlovu =

South African rower

Sizwe Lawrence Ndlovu
Personal information
- Nationality: South African
- Born: 24 September 1980 (age 46) Johannesburg, South Africa

Sport
- Country: South Africa
- Sport: Rowing
Medal record
Men's rowing
Representing South Africa
Olympic Games
Gold medal – first place	2012 London	Coxless four

Sizwe Lawrence Ndlovu (born 24 September 1980) is a South African rower. He won a gold medal in the Men's lightweight coxless four event at the 2012 Summer Olympics. It was South Africa's first ever Olympic gold medal for rowing. The rest of the team were James Thompson, John Smith and Matthew Brittain.
