= Tycho Muda =

Dutch rower

Tycho Muda (born 14 August 1988 in Amsterdam) is a Dutch rower.

== Professional career ==
He competed in the lightweight coxless four at the 2012 Summer Olympics. Muda started rowing at Weesp rowing club together with his twin brother Vincent.
