= Merel de Blaeij =

Dutch field hockey player

Personal information
- Born: 2 December 1986 (age 39) The Hague, Netherlands

Sport
- Sport: Field hockey
Senior career
Years	Team	Caps	Goals
–	HCKZ; MHC Laren	-	-
National team
Years	Team	Caps	Goals
2012 – present	Netherlands	5	(0)
Medal record
Women's field hockey
Representing the Netherlands
Olympic Games
Gold medal – first place	2012 London	Team competition
Champions Trophy
Bronze medal – third place	2012 Rosario	Team competition

Merel de Blaeij (also spelled Blaey, born 2 December 1986) is a Dutch field hockey player. At the 2012 Summer Olympics, she was part of the Netherlands women's field hockey team that became Olympic champions, defeating Argentina 2–0 in the final.
