= Sizwe Zakho =

Sizwe Zako
- Born: Sizwe Zako
- Occupations: Recording artist, jazz, gospel
- Musical career
- Genres: Jazz, gospel
- Instruments: keyboards, organ
- Labels: Gallo, Indie

Sizwe Zako is a South African born music producer, he is known for producing artists like Rebecca Malope, Israel Mosehla and worked with a whole host of other gospel. He also traveled around the continent of Africa hosting workshops on gospel music. Zako's distinct style of producing has seen a massive turnaround in the South African gospel scene in such a way that many upcoming musicians aspired to work with him.
