= List of cyclists at the 2012 Summer Olympics =

This is a list of all cyclists who competed at the 2012 Summer Olympics in London, United Kingdom. A total of 505 cyclists from 74 countries competed in the 18 cycling events in the disciplines: BMX, mountain biking, road cycling, and track cycling.

The Dutch Ellen van Dijk and the German Judith Arndt competed both on the track and on the road in 3 different events. In total six cyclists competed in two cycling disciplines and ten cyclists competed in three cycling events.

The youngest cyclist was Mathias Møller Nielsen from Denmark (18 years, 137 days), and the oldest cyclist was María Luisa Calle from Colombia (43 years, 308 days).

== 2012 Olympic cyclists ==
Cyclist	Nation	Discipline	Event
Laura Abril	Colombia	Mountain biking	Women's cross-country
Julien Absalon	France	Mountain biking	Men's cross-country
Ahmet Akdilek	Turkey	Road cycling	Men's road race
Ahmet Akdilek	Turkey	Road cycling	Men's road time trial
Michael Albasini	Switzerland	Road cycling	Men's road race
Michael Albasini	Switzerland	Road cycling	Men's road time trial
Arnold Alcolea	Cuba	Road cycling	Men's road race
Sandra Aleksejeva	Latvia	BMX	Women's BMX
Andrey Amador	Costa Rica	Road cycling	Men's road race
Alena Amialiusik	Belarus	Road cycling	Women's road race
Alyona Andruk	Ukraine	Road cycling	Women's road race
Tatiana Antoshina	Russia	Road cycling	Women's road race
Tatiana Antoshina	Russia	Road cycling	Women's road time trial
Juan Arango	Colombia	Track cycling	Men's omnium
Juan Arango	Colombia	Track cycling	Men's team pursuit
Yukiya Arashiro	Japan	Road cycling	Men's road race
Shane Archbold	New Zealand	Track cycling	Men's omnium
Lizzie Armitstead	Great Britain	Road cycling	Women's road race
Lizzie Armitstead	Great Britain	Road cycling	Women's road time trial
Kristin Armstrong	United States	Road cycling	Women's road race
Kristin Armstrong	United States	Road cycling	Women's road time trial
Judith Arndt	Germany	Road cycling	Women's road race
Judith Arndt	Germany	Road cycling	Women's road time trial
Judith Arndt	Germany	Track cycling	Women's team pursuit
Marios Athanasiadis	Cyprus	Mountain biking	Men's cross-country
Edwin Ávila	Colombia	Track cycling	Men's team pursuit
Azizulhasni Awang	Malaysia	Track cycling	Men's sprint
Azizulhasni Awang	Malaysia	Track cycling	Men's keirin
Monia Baccaille	Italy	Road cycling	Women's road race
Gediminas Bagdonas	Lithuania	Road cycling	Men's road race
Maik Baier	Germany	BMX	Men's BMX
Lars Bak	Denmark	Road cycling	Men's road race
Lars Bak	Denmark	Road cycling	Men's road time trial
Albert Barcelo	Spain	Track cycling	Men's team pursuit
Marc Bassingthwaighte	Namibia	Mountain biking	Men's cross-country
Polona Batagelj	Slovenia	Road cycling	Women's road race
Emily Batty	Canada	Mountain biking	Women's cross-country
Jack Bauer	New Zealand	Road cycling	Men's road race
Jack Bauer	New Zealand	Road cycling	Men's road time trial
Grégory Baugé	France	Track cycling	Men's sprint
Grégory Baugé	France	Track cycling	Men's team sprint
Dotsie Bausch	United States	Track cycling	Women's team pursuit
Assan Bazayev	Kazakhstan	Road cycling	Men's road race
Assan Bazayev	Kazakhstan	Road cycling	Men's road time trial
Charlotte Becker	Germany	Road cycling	Women's road race
Charlotte Becker	Germany	Track cycling	Women's team pursuit
Zachary Bell	Canada	Track cycling	Men's omnium
Yana Belomoyna	Ukraine	Mountain biking	Women's cross-country
Barbara Benkó	Hungary	Mountain biking	Women's cross-country
Fumiyuki Beppu	Japan	Road cycling	Men's road race
Fumiyuki Beppu	Japan	Road cycling	Men's road time trial
Oleg Berdos	Moldova	Road cycling	Men's road race
Pablo Bernal	Spain	Track cycling	Men's team pursuit
Sam Bewley	New Zealand	Track cycling	Men's team pursuit
Aude Biannic	France	Road cycling	Women's road race
Maciej Bielecki	Poland	Track cycling	Men's team sprint
Raymon van der Biezen	Netherlands	BMX	Men's BMX
Edvald Boasson Hagen	Norway	Road cycling	Men's road race
Edvald Boasson Hagen	Norway	Road cycling	Men's road time trial
Jack Bobridge	Australia	Track cycling	Men's team pursuit
Yelyzaveta Bochkaryova	Ukraine	Track cycling	Women's team pursuit
Maciej Bodnar	Poland	Road cycling	Men's road race
Maciej Bodnar	Poland	Road cycling	Men's road time trial
Grega Bole	Slovenia	Road cycling	Men's road race
Lars Boom	Netherlands	Road cycling	Men's road race
Lars Boom	Netherlands	Road cycling	Men's road time trial
Tom Boonen	Belgium	Road cycling	Men's road race
Sergey Borisov	Russia	Track cycling	Men's keirin
Sergey Borisov	Russia	Track cycling	Men's team sprint
Mickaël Bourgain	France	Road cycling	Men's road race
Mickaël Bourgain	France	Track cycling	Men's keirin
Borut Božič	Slovenia	Road cycling	Men's road race
Janez Brajkovič	Slovenia	Road cycling	Men's road race
Janez Brajkovič	Slovenia	Road cycling	Men's road time trial
Lisa Brennauer	Germany	Track cycling	Women's team pursuit
Matti Breschel	Denmark	Road cycling	Men's road race
Julie Bresset	France	Mountain biking	Women's cross-country
Luis Brethauer	Germany	BMX	Men's BMX
Giorgia Bronzini	Italy	Road cycling	Women's road race
Piotr Brzózka	Poland	Mountain biking	Men's cross-country
Caroline Buchanan	Australia	BMX	Women's BMX
Steven Burke	Great Britain	Track cycling	Men's team pursuit
Philip Buys	South Africa	Mountain biking	Men's cross-country
Jan Bárta	Czech Republic	Road cycling	Men's road race
Quentin Caleyron	France	BMX	Men's BMX
María Luisa Calle	Colombia	Track cycling	Women's omnium
Daniel Caluag	Philippines	BMX	Men's BMX
Fabian Cancellara	Switzerland	Road cycling	Men's road race
Fabian Cancellara	Switzerland	Road cycling	Men's road time trial
Hersony Canelón	Venezuela	Track cycling	Men's sprint
Hersony Canelón	Venezuela	Track cycling	Men's keirin
Hersony Canelón	Venezuela	Track cycling	Men's team sprint
Noemi Cantele	Italy	Road cycling	Women's road race
Noemi Cantele	Italy	Road cycling	Women's road time trial
Manuel Antonio Cardoso	Portugal	Road cycling	Men's road race
Gillian Carleton	Canada	Track cycling	Women's team pursuit
Arles Castro	Colombia	Track cycling	Men's team pursuit
Jonathan Castroviejo	Spain	Road cycling	Men's road race
Jonathan Castroviejo	Spain	Road cycling	Men's road time trial
Mark Cavendish	Great Britain	Road cycling	Men's road race
Chan Chun Hing	Hong Kong	Mountain biking	Men's cross-country
Sylvain Chavanel	France	Road cycling	Men's road race
Sylvain Chavanel	France	Road cycling	Men's road time trial
Cheng Changsong	China	Track cycling	Men's team sprint
Cho Ho-sung	South Korea	Track cycling	Men's omnium
Choi Ki Ho	Hong Kong	Track cycling	Men's omnium
Choi Seung-woo	South Korea	Track cycling	Men's team pursuit
Ondřej Cink	Czech Republic	Mountain biking	Men's cross-country
Sandie Clair	France	Track cycling	Women's team sprint
Ed Clancy	Great Britain	Track cycling	Men's omnium
Ed Clancy	Great Britain	Track cycling	Men's team pursuit
Carlos Coloma Nicolás	Spain	Mountain biking	Men's cross-country
Nicole Cooke	Great Britain	Road cycling	Women's road race
Bryan Coquard	France	Track cycling	Men's omnium
Audrey Cordon	France	Road cycling	Women's road race
Audrey Cordon	France	Road cycling	Women's road time trial
Dominique Cornu	Belgium	Track cycling	Men's team pursuit
Rui Costa	Portugal	Road cycling	Men's road race
Brooke Crain	United States	BMX	Women's BMX
Dan Craven	Namibia	Road cycling	Men's road race
Virginie Cueff	France	Track cycling	Women's sprint
Virginie Cueff	France	Track cycling	Women's team sprint
Michaël D'Almeida	France	Track cycling	Men's team sprint
Jolien D'Hoore	Belgium	Track cycling	Women's omnium
Fernanda da Silva	Brazil	Road cycling	Women's road race
Gunn-Rita Dahle Flesjå	Norway	Mountain biking	Women's cross-country
Joris Daudet	France	BMX	Men's BMX
Lea Davison	United States	Mountain biking	Women's cross-country
Aleksandra Dawidowicz	Poland	Mountain biking	Women's cross-country
Eddie Dawkins	New Zealand	Track cycling	Men's sprint
Eddie Dawkins	New Zealand	Track cycling	Men's team sprint
Kenny De Ketele	Belgium	Track cycling	Men's team pursuit
Manuel de Vecchi	Italy	BMX	Men's BMX
Liesbet De Vocht	Belgium	Road cycling	Women's road race
Liesbet De Vocht	Belgium	Road cycling	Women's road time trial
John Degenkolb	Germany	Road cycling	Men's road race
Rohan Dennis	Australia	Track cycling	Men's team pursuit
Laurent Didier	Luxembourg	Road cycling	Men's road race
Ellen van Dijk	Netherlands	Road cycling	Women's road race
Ellen van Dijk	Netherlands	Road cycling	Women's road time trial
Ellen van Dijk	Netherlands	Track cycling	Women's team pursuit
Denis Dmitriev	Russia	Track cycling	Men's sprint
Denis Dmitriev	Russia	Track cycling	Men's team sprint
Íngrid Drexel	Mexico	Road cycling	Women's road race
Fabio Duarte	Colombia	Road cycling	Men's road race
Fabio Duarte	Colombia	Road cycling	Men's road time trial
Arnaud Dubois	Belgium	BMX	Men's BMX
Jonathan Dufrasne	Belgium	Track cycling	Men's team pursuit
Timmy Duggan	United States	Road cycling	Men's road race
Alena Dylko	Belarus	Track cycling	Women's team pursuit
Arnaud Démare	France	Road cycling	Men's road race
Annette Edmondson	Australia	Track cycling	Women's omnium
Annette Edmondson	Australia	Track cycling	Women's team pursuit
Bernhard Eisel	Austria	Road cycling	Men's road race
Lauren Ellis	New Zealand	Track cycling	Women's team pursuit
Martin Elmiger	Switzerland	Road cycling	Men's road race
René Enders	Germany	Track cycling	Men's team sprint
Alexandra Engen	Sweden	Mountain biking	Women's cross-country
Bernard Esterhuizen	South Africa	Track cycling	Men's sprint
Cadel Evans	Australia	Road cycling	Men's road race
Emilia Fahlin	Sweden	Road cycling	Women's road race
Emilia Fahlin	Sweden	Road cycling	Women's road time trial
Emilio Falla	Ecuador	BMX	Men's BMX
Tyler Farrar	United States	Road cycling	Men's road race
Clemilda Fernandes	Brazil	Road cycling	Women's road race
Clemilda Fernandes	Brazil	Road cycling	Women's road time trial
Janildes Fernandes	Brazil	Road cycling	Women's road race
Pauline Ferrand-Prévot	France	Road cycling	Women's road race
Pauline Ferrand-Prévot	France	Mountain biking	Women's cross-country
Connor Fields	United States	BMX	Men's BMX
Murilo Fischer	Brazil	Road cycling	Men's road race
Marco Aurelio Fontana	Italy	Mountain biking	Men's cross-country
Chris Froome	Great Britain	Road cycling	Men's road race
Chris Froome	Great Britain	Road cycling	Men's road time trial
Jakob Fuglsang	Denmark	Road cycling	Men's road race
Jakob Fuglsang	Denmark	Road cycling	Men's road time trial
Manuel Fumic	Germany	Mountain biking	Men's cross-country
Robert Förstemann	Germany	Track cycling	Men's sprint
Robert Förstemann	Germany	Track cycling	Men's team sprint
Tony Gallopin	France	Road cycling	Men's road race
Diana García	Colombia	Track cycling	Women's team sprint
Evelyn García	El Salvador	Road cycling	Women's road race
Danielys García	Venezuela	Road cycling	Women's road race
Tejay van Garderen	United States	Road cycling	Men's road race
Gonzalo Garrido	Chile	Road cycling	Men's road race
Aaron Gate	New Zealand	Track cycling	Men's team pursuit
Juliana Gaviria	Colombia	Track cycling	Women's sprint
Juliana Gaviria	Colombia	Track cycling	Women's keirin
Juliana Gaviria	Colombia	Track cycling	Women's team sprint
Alexander Gehbauer	Austria	Mountain biking	Men's cross-country
Twan van Gendt	Netherlands	BMX	Men's BMX
Simon Gerrans	Australia	Road cycling	Men's road race
Robert Gesink	Netherlands	Road cycling	Men's road race
Tomás Gil	Venezuela	Road cycling	Men's road race
Tomás Gil	Venezuela	Road cycling	Men's road time trial
Philippe Gilbert	Belgium	Road cycling	Men's road race
Philippe Gilbert	Belgium	Road cycling	Men's road time trial
Shara Gillow	Australia	Road cycling	Women's road race
Shara Gillow	Australia	Road cycling	Women's road time trial
Jasmin Glaesser	Canada	Track cycling	Women's team pursuit
Matthew Glaetzer	Australia	Track cycling	Men's team sprint
Ekaterina Gnidenko	Russia	Track cycling	Women's sprint
Ekaterina Gnidenko	Russia	Track cycling	Women's keirin
Gong Jinjie	China	Track cycling	Women's team sprint
Yumari González	Cuba	Road cycling	Women's road race
Angie González	Venezuela	Track cycling	Women's omnium
Jelle van Gorkom	Netherlands	BMX	Men's BMX
Paula Gorycka	Poland	Mountain biking	Women's cross-country
Matthew Goss	Australia	Road cycling	Men's road race
Westley Gough	New Zealand	Track cycling	Men's team pursuit
Georgia Gould	United States	Mountain biking	Women's cross-country
Michał Gołaś	Poland	Road cycling	Men's road race
Bert Grabsch	Germany	Road cycling	Men's road race
Bert Grabsch	Germany	Road cycling	Men's road time trial
André Greipel	Germany	Road cycling	Men's road race
Robyn de Groot	South Africa	Road cycling	Women's road race
Byron Guamá	Ecuador	Road cycling	Men's road race
Tatiana Guderzo	Italy	Road cycling	Women's road race
Tatiana Guderzo	Italy	Road cycling	Women's road time trial
Lisandra Guerra	Cuba	Track cycling	Women's sprint
Lisandra Guerra	Cuba	Track cycling	Women's keirin
Loes Gunnewijk	Netherlands	Road cycling	Women's road race
Guo Shuang	China	Track cycling	Women's sprint
Guo Shuang	China	Track cycling	Women's keirin
Guo Shuang	China	Track cycling	Women's team sprint
Spas Gyurov	Bulgaria	Road cycling	Men's road race
Soufiane Haddi	Morocco	Road cycling	Men's road race
Alireza Haghi	Iran	Road cycling	Men's road race
Alireza Haghi	Iran	Road cycling	Men's road time trial
Mayuko Hagiwara	Japan	Road cycling	Women's road race
Aurelie Halbwachs	Mauritius	Road cycling	Women's road race
Muradjan Halmuratov	Uzbekistan	Road cycling	Men's road race
Svitlana Halyuk	Ukraine	Track cycling	Women's team pursuit
Sarah Hammer	United States	Track cycling	Women's omnium
Sarah Hammer	United States	Track cycling	Women's team pursuit
Karen Hanlen	New Zealand	Mountain biking	Women's cross-country
Lasse Norman Hansen	Denmark	Track cycling	Men's omnium
Lasse Norman Hansen	Denmark	Track cycling	Men's team pursuit
Natasha Hansen	New Zealand	Track cycling	Women's sprint
Natasha Hansen	New Zealand	Track cycling	Women's keirin
Omar Hasanin	Syria	Road cycling	Men's road race
Levi Heimans	Netherlands	Track cycling	Men's team pursuit
Sergio Henao	Colombia	Road cycling	Men's road race
Rebecca Henderson	Australia	Mountain biking	Women's cross-country
Greg Henderson	New Zealand	Road cycling	Men's road race
Ludivine Henrion	Belgium	Road cycling	Women's road race
Michael Hepburn	Australia	Track cycling	Men's team pursuit
David Herman	United States	BMX	Men's BMX
José Antonio Hermida	Spain	Mountain biking	Men's cross-country
Stefany Hernández	Venezuela	BMX	Women's BMX
Ryder Hesjedal	Canada	Road cycling	Men's road race
Ryder Hesjedal	Canada	Road cycling	Men's road time trial
Yvonne Hijgenaar	Netherlands	Track cycling	Women's team sprint
Philip Hindes	Great Britain	Track cycling	Men's team sprint
Aneta Hladíková	Czech Republic	BMX	Women's BMX
Chris Horner	United States	Road cycling	Men's road race
Derek Horton	Guam	Mountain biking	Men's cross-country
Chloe Hosking	Australia	Road cycling	Women's road race
Melissa Hoskins	Australia	Track cycling	Women's team pursuit
Rudi van Houts	Netherlands	Mountain biking	Men's cross-country
Chris Hoy	Great Britain	Track cycling	Men's keirin
Chris Hoy	Great Britain	Track cycling	Men's team sprint
Andriy Hryvko	Ukraine	Road cycling	Men's road race
Hsiao Mei-yu	Chinese Taipei	Road cycling	Women's road race
Hsiao Mei-yu	Chinese Taipei	Road cycling	Women's omnium
Huang Li	China	Track cycling	Women's omnium
Clara Hughes	Canada	Road cycling	Women's road race
Clara Hughes	Canada	Road cycling	Women's road time trial
Jenning Huizenga	Netherlands	Track cycling	Men's team pursuit
Yauheni Hutarovich	Belarus	Road cycling	Men's road race
Periklis Ilias	Greece	Mountain biking	Men's cross-country
Daryl Impey	South Africa	Road cycling	Men's road race
Martyn Irvine	Ireland	Track cycling	Men's omnium
Vladimir Isaichev	Russia	Road cycling	Men's road race
Jang Sun-jae	South Korea	Track cycling	Men's team pursuit
Adil Jelloul	Morocco	Road cycling	Men's road race
Jiang Fan	China	Track cycling	Women's team pursuit
Jiang Wenwen	China	Track cycling	Women's team pursuit
Andrés Jiménez	Colombia	BMX	Men's BMX
Emma Johansson	Sweden	Road cycling	Women's road race
Emma Johansson	Sweden	Road cycling	Women's road time trial
David Juaneda	Spain	Track cycling	Men's team pursuit
Geoff Kabush	Canada	Mountain biking	Men's cross-country
Miraç Kal	Turkey	Road cycling	Men's road race
Irina Kalentieva	Russia	Mountain biking	Women's cross-country
Lesya Kalytovska	Ukraine	Track cycling	Women's team pursuit
Willy Kanis	Netherlands	Track cycling	Women's sprint
Willy Kanis	Netherlands	Track cycling	Women's keirin
Willy Kanis	Netherlands	Track cycling	Women's team sprint
Gabor Kasa	Serbia	Road cycling	Men's road race
Rie Katayama	Japan	Mountain biking	Women's cross-country
Pavel Kelemen	Czech Republic	Track cycling	Men's sprint
Peter Kennaugh	Great Britain	Track cycling	Men's team pursuit
Jason Kenny	Great Britain	Track cycling	Men's sprint
Jason Kenny	Great Britain	Track cycling	Men's team sprint
Gerhard Kerschbaumer	Italy	Mountain biking	Men's cross-country
Jo Kiesanowski	New Zealand	Track cycling	Women's omnium
Liam Killeen	Great Britain	Mountain biking	Men's cross-country
Danielle King	Great Britain	Track cycling	Women's team pursuit
Brian Kirkham	Australia	BMX	Men's BMX
Vasil Kiryienka	Belarus	Road cycling	Men's road race
Vasil Kiryienka	Belarus	Road cycling	Men's road time trial
Blaža Klemenčič	Slovenia	Mountain biking	Women's cross-country
Roger Kluge	Germany	Track cycling	Men's omnium
Vera Koedooder	Netherlands	Track cycling	Women's team pursuit
Alexandr Kolobnev	Russia	Road cycling	Men's road race
Marek Konwa	Poland	Mountain biking	Men's cross-country
Evgeny Kovalev	Russia	Track cycling	Men's team pursuit
Ivan Kovalev	Russia	Track cycling	Men's team pursuit
Roman Kreuziger	Czech Republic	Road cycling	Men's road race
Alexander Kristoff	Norway	Road cycling	Men's road race
Dmytro Krivtsov	Ukraine	Road cycling	Men's road race
Simona Krupeckaitė	Lithuania	Track cycling	Women's sprint
Simona Krupeckaitė	Lithuania	Track cycling	Women's keirin
Sergey Kucherov	Russia	Track cycling	Men's team sprint
Kamil Kuczyński	Poland	Track cycling	Men's keirin
Kamil Kuczyński	Poland	Track cycling	Men's team sprint
Jaroslav Kulhavý	Czech Republic	Mountain biking	Men's cross-country
Michał Kwiatkowski	Poland	Road cycling	Men's road race
Kemal Küçükbay	Turkey	Road cycling	Men's road race
Romana Labounková	Czech Republic	BMX	Women's BMX
Vegard Laengen	Norway	Road cycling	Men's road race
Azzedine Lagab	Algeria	Road cycling	Men's road race
Sergey Lagutin	Uzbekistan	Road cycling	Men's road race
Mouhcine Lahsaini	Morocco	Road cycling	Men's road time trial
Mouhcine Lahsaini	Morocco	Road cycling	Men's road race
Sebastian Langeveld	Netherlands	Road cycling	Men's road race
Daniela Larreal	Venezuela	Track cycling	Women's sprint
Daniela Larreal	Venezuela	Track cycling	Women's keirin
Daniela Larreal	Venezuela	Track cycling	Women's team sprint
Gustav Larsson	Sweden	Road cycling	Men's road race
Gustav Larsson	Sweden	Road cycling	Men's road time trial
Annie Last	Great Britain	Mountain biking	Women's cross-country
Laëtitia Le Corguillé	France	BMX	Women's BMX
Bobby Lea	United States	Track cycling	Men's omnium
Eva Lechner	Italy	Mountain biking	Women's cross-country
Lee Eun-ji	South Korea	Track cycling	Women's team sprint
Lee Hye-jin	South Korea	Track cycling	Women's sprint
Lee Hye-jin	South Korea	Track cycling	Women's keirin
Lee Hye-jin	South Korea	Track cycling	Women's team sprint
Lee Min-hye	South Korea	Track cycling	Women's omnium
Lee Wai Sze	Hong Kong	Track cycling	Women's sprint
Lee Wai Sze	Hong Kong	Track cycling	Women's keirin
Katrin Leumann	Switzerland	Mountain biking	Women's cross-country
Maximilian Levy	Germany	Track cycling	Men's keirin
Maximilian Levy	Germany	Track cycling	Men's team sprint
Liang Jing	China	Track cycling	Women's team pursuit
Carlos Linarez	Venezuela	Track cycling	Men's omnium
Liu Xin	China	Road cycling	Women's road race
Nicholas Long	United States	BMX	Men's BMX
Krisztián Lovassy	Hungary	Road cycling	Men's road race
Kayono Maeda	Japan	Track cycling	Women's sprint
Christine Majerus	Luxembourg	Road cycling	Women's road race
Rene Mandri	Estonia	Road cycling	Men's road race
Jutatip Maneephan	Thailand	Road cycling	Women's road race
Luis Mansilla	Chile	Track cycling	Men's omnium
Sergio Mantecón Gutiérrez	Spain	Mountain biking	Men's cross-country
César Marcano	Venezuela	Track cycling	Men's team sprint
Alexei Markov	Russia	Track cycling	Men's team pursuit
Karl Markt	Austria	Mountain biking	Men's cross-country
Lucy Martin	Great Britain	Road cycling	Women's road race
Tony Martin	Germany	Road cycling	Men's road race
Tony Martin	Germany	Road cycling	Men's road time trial
Dan Martin	Ireland	Road cycling	Men's road race
Hodei Mazquiarán	Spain	Track cycling	Men's sprint
David McCann	Ireland	Road cycling	Men's road race
David McCann	Ireland	Road cycling	Men's road time trial
Daniel McConnell	Australia	Mountain biking	Men's cross-country
Kaarle McCulloch	Australia	Track cycling	Women's team sprint
Anna Meares	Australia	Track cycling	Women's sprint
Anna Meares	Australia	Track cycling	Women's keirin
Anna Meares	Australia	Track cycling	Women's team sprint
Marlies Mejías	Cuba	Track cycling	Women's omnium
Denis Menchov	Russia	Road cycling	Men's road race
Denis Menchov	Russia	Road cycling	Men's road time trial
Moritz Milatz	Germany	Mountain biking	Men's cross-country
David Millar	Great Britain	Road cycling	Men's road race
Ethan Mitchell	New Zealand	Track cycling	Men's team sprint
Emilie Moberg	Norway	Road cycling	Women's road race
Sacha Modolo	Italy	Road cycling	Men's road race
Paolo Montoya	Costa Rica	Mountain biking	Men's cross-country
Moana Moo Caille	France	BMX	Men's BMX
Ashleigh Moolman	South Africa	Road cycling	Women's road race
Ashleigh Moolman	South Africa	Road cycling	Women's road time trial
Adelheid Morath	Germany	Mountain biking	Women's cross-country
Teun Mulder	Netherlands	Track cycling	Men's keirin
Fatehah Mustapa	Malaysia	Track cycling	Women's keirin
Paola Muñoz	Chile	Road cycling	Women's road race
Michael Mørkøv	Denmark	Track cycling	Men's team pursuit
Na Ah-reum	South Korea	Road cycling	Women's road race
Giorgi Nadiradze	Georgia	Road cycling	Men's road race
Seiichiro Nakagawa	Japan	Track cycling	Men's sprint
Seiichiro Nakagawa	Japan	Track cycling	Men's team sprint
Kateřina Nash	Czech Republic	Mountain biking	Women's cross-country
Ramūnas Navardauskas	Lithuania	Road cycling	Men's road race
Ramūnas Navardauskas	Lithuania	Road cycling	Men's road time trial
Magno Nazaret	Brazil	Road cycling	Men's road race
Magno Nazaret	Brazil	Road cycling	Men's road time trial
Amber Neben	United States	Road cycling	Women's road race
Amber Neben	United States	Road cycling	Women's road time trial
Andrei Nechita	Romania	Road cycling	Men's road race
Candice Neethling	South Africa	Mountain biking	Women's cross-country
Sifiso Nhlapo	South Africa	BMX	Men's BMX
Vincenzo Nibali	Italy	Road cycling	Men's road race
Jaime Nielsen	New Zealand	Track cycling	Women's team pursuit
Mathias Møller Nielsen	Denmark	Track cycling	Men's team pursuit
Yudai Nitta	Japan	Track cycling	Men's team sprint
Adrien Niyonshuti	Rwanda	Mountain biking	Men's cross-country
Lars Petter Nordhaug	Norway	Road cycling	Men's road race
Joëlle Numainville	Canada	Road cycling	Women's road race
Tory Nyhaug	Canada	BMX	Men's BMX
Sven Nys	Belgium	Mountain biking	Men's cross-country
Ralph Näf	Switzerland	Mountain biking	Men's cross-country
Stuart O'Grady	Australia	Road cycling	Men's road race
Glenn O'Shea	Australia	Track cycling	Men's omnium
Glenn O'Shea	Australia	Track cycling	Men's team pursuit
Leire Olaberria	Spain	Track cycling	Women's omnium
Shelley Olds	United States	Road cycling	Women's road race
Nelson Oliveira	Portugal	Road cycling	Men's road race
Nelson Oliveira	Portugal	Road cycling	Men's road time trial
Carlos Oquendo	Colombia	BMX	Men's BMX
Elisabeth Osl	Austria	Mountain biking	Women's cross-country
Muhamad Othman	Malaysia	Road cycling	Men's road race
Héctor Leonardo Páez	Colombia	Mountain biking	Men's cross-country
Mariana Pajón	Colombia	BMX	Women's BMX
Olga Panarina	Belarus	Track cycling	Women's sprint
Olga Panarina	Belarus	Track cycling	Women's keirin
Gregolry Panizo	Brazil	Road cycling	Men's road race
Larisa Pankova	Russia	Road cycling	Women's road race
Luca Paolini	Italy	Road cycling	Men's road race
Aksana Papko	Belarus	Track cycling	Women's team pursuit
Park Keon-woo	South Korea	Track cycling	Men's team pursuit
Park Seon-ho	South Korea	Track cycling	Men's team pursuit
Park Sung-baek	South Korea	Road cycling	Men's road race
András Parti	Hungary	Mountain biking	Men's cross-country
Katarzyna Pawłowska	Poland	Road cycling	Women's road race
Evgeniy Pechenin	Russia	Mountain biking	Men's cross-country
Victoria Pendleton	Great Britain	Track cycling	Women's sprint
Victoria Pendleton	Great Britain	Track cycling	Women's keirin
Victoria Pendleton	Great Britain	Track cycling	Women's team sprint
Catharine Pendrel	Canada	Mountain biking	Women's cross-country
Juan Peralta	Spain	Track cycling	Men's keirin
Shane Perkins	Australia	Track cycling	Men's sprint
Shane Perkins	Australia	Track cycling	Men's keirin
Shane Perkins	Australia	Track cycling	Men's team sprint
Danail Petrov	Bulgaria	Road cycling	Men's road race
Njisane Phillip	Trinidad and Tobago	Track cycling	Men's sprint
Njisane Phillip	Trinidad and Tobago	Track cycling	Men's keirin
Liam Phillips	Great Britain	BMX	Men's BMX
Taylor Phinney	United States	Road cycling	Men's road race
Taylor Phinney	United States	Road cycling	Men's road time trial
Kurt Pickard	New Zealand	BMX	Men's BMX
Amy Pieters	Netherlands	Track cycling	Women's team pursuit
Marco Pinotti	Italy	Road cycling	Men's road race
Marco Pinotti	Italy	Road cycling	Men's road time trial
Ernesto Pizarro	Argentina	BMX	Men's BMX
Max Plaxton	Canada	Mountain biking	Men's cross-country
Ángel Pulgar	Venezuela	Track cycling	Men's team sprint
Maaike Polspoel	Belgium	Road cycling	Women's road race
Emma Pooley	Great Britain	Road cycling	Women's road race
Emma Pooley	Great Britain	Road cycling	Women's road time trial
Alise Willoughby	United States	BMX	Women's BMX
Magalie Pottier	France	BMX	Women's BMX
Fabián Puerta	Colombia	Track cycling	Men's keirin
Jean-Christophe Péraud	France	Mountain biking	Men's cross-country
Walter Pérez	Argentina	Track cycling	Men's omnium
Rasmus Quaade	Denmark	Track cycling	Men's team pursuit
Denise Ramsden	Canada	Road cycling	Women's road race
Denise Ramsden	Canada	Road cycling	Women's road time trial
Héctor Rangel	Mexico	Road cycling	Men's road race
Grégory Rast	Switzerland	Road cycling	Men's road race
Shanaze Reade	Great Britain	BMX	Women's BMX
Jennie Reed	United States	Track cycling	Women's team pursuit
Lauren Reynolds	Australia	BMX	Women's BMX
Renato Rezende	Brazil	BMX	Men's BMX
Maximiliano Richeze	Argentina	Road cycling	Men's road race
Vilma Rimšaitė	Lithuania	BMX	Women's BMX
Roger Rinderknecht	Switzerland	BMX	Men's BMX
Kevin Ríos	Colombia	Track cycling	Men's team pursuit
Nicolas Roche	Ireland	Road cycling	Men's road race
Manuel Rodas	Guatemala	Road cycling	Men's road race
Jackson Rodríguez	Venezuela	Road cycling	Men's road race
Jürgen Roelandts	Belgium	Road cycling	Men's road race
Michael Rogers	Australia	Road cycling	Men's road race
Michael Rogers	Australia	Road cycling	Men's road time trial
Radoslav Rogina	Croatia	Road cycling	Men's road race
José Joaquín Rojas	Spain	Road cycling	Men's road race
Weimar Roldán	Colombia	Track cycling	Men's team pursuit
Evgenia Romanyuta	Russia	Track cycling	Women's omnium
David Rosa	Portugal	Mountain biking	Men's cross-country
Joanna Rowsell	Great Britain	Track cycling	Women's team pursuit
Amir Rusli	Malaysia	Road cycling	Men's road race
Marc Ryan	New Zealand	Track cycling	Men's team pursuit
Sergiy Rysenko	Ukraine	Mountain biking	Men's cross-country
Peter Sagan	Slovakia	Road cycling	Men's road race
Branislau Samoilau	Belarus	Road cycling	Men's road race
Clara Sanchez	France	Track cycling	Women's keirin
Clara Sanchez	France	Track cycling	Women's omnium
Aleksejs Saramotins	Latvia	Road cycling	Men's road race
Daniel Schorn	Austria	Road cycling	Men's road race
Samuel Schultz	United States	Mountain biking	Men's cross-country
Nino Schurter	Switzerland	Mountain biking	Men's cross-country
Michael Schär	Switzerland	Road cycling	Men's road race
Jesse Sergent	New Zealand	Track cycling	Men's team pursuit
Alexander Serov	Russia	Track cycling	Men's team pursuit
Alison Shanks	New Zealand	Track cycling	Women's team pursuit
Tatsiana Sharakova	Belarus	Track cycling	Women's omnium
Tatsiana Sharakova	Belarus	Track cycling	Women's team pursuit
Shi Qinglan	China	Mountain biking	Women's cross-country
Lyubov Shulika	Ukraine	Track cycling	Women's sprint
Lyubov Shulika	Ukraine	Track cycling	Women's keirin
Lyubov Shulika	Ukraine	Track cycling	Women's team sprint
Marcel Sieberg	Germany	Road cycling	Men's road race
Kévin Sireau	France	Track cycling	Men's team sprint
Laura Smulders	Netherlands	BMX	Women's BMX
Mehdi Sohrabi	Iran	Road cycling	Men's road race
Catriel Soto	Argentina	Mountain biking	Men's cross-country
Jorge Soto	Uruguay	Road cycling	Men's road race
Sabine Spitz	Germany	Mountain biking	Women's cross-country
Amanda Spratt	Australia	Road cycling	Women's road race
Burry Stander	South Africa	Mountain biking	Men's cross-country
Ian Stannard	Great Britain	Road cycling	Men's road race
Squel Stein	Brazil	BMX	Women's BMX
Evelyn Stevens	United States	Road cycling	Women's road race
Ivan Stević	Serbia	Road cycling	Men's road race
Wim Stroetinga	Netherlands	Track cycling	Men's team pursuit
Monique Sullivan	Canada	Track cycling	Women's sprint
Monique Sullivan	Canada	Track cycling	Women's keirin
Scott Sunderland	Australia	Track cycling	Men's team sprint
Pia Sundstedt	Finland	Road cycling	Women's road race
Pia Sundstedt	Finland	Road cycling	Women's road time trial
Luis León Sánchez	Spain	Road cycling	Men's road race
Luis León Sánchez	Spain	Road cycling	Men's road time trial
Isabelle Söderberg	Sweden	Road cycling	Women's road race
Nicki Sørensen	Denmark	Road cycling	Men's road race
Esther Süss	Switzerland	Mountain biking	Women's cross-country
Lauren Tamayo	United States	Track cycling	Women's team pursuit
Ioannis Tamouridis	Greece	Road cycling	Men's road race
Elena Tchalykh	Azerbaijan	Road cycling	Women's road race
Elena Tchalykh	Azerbaijan	Road cycling	Women's road time trial
Daniel Teklehaymanot	Eritrea	Road cycling	Men's road race
Stéphane Tempier	France	Mountain biking	Men's cross-country
Niki Terpstra	Netherlands	Road cycling	Men's road race
Eloy Teruel	Spain	Track cycling	Men's omnium
Eloy Teruel	Spain	Track cycling	Men's team pursuit
Ina-Yoko Teutenberg	Germany	Road cycling	Women's road race
Morten Therkildsen	Denmark	BMX	Men's BMX
Geraint Thomas	Great Britain	Track cycling	Men's team pursuit
Josephine Tomic	Australia	Track cycling	Women's team pursuit
Tong Weisong	China	Mountain biking	Men's cross-country
Grete Treier	Estonia	Road cycling	Women's road race
Edžus Treimanis	Latvia	BMX	Men's BMX
Laura Trott	Great Britain	Track cycling	Women's omnium
Laura Trott	Great Britain	Track cycling	Women's team pursuit
Olena Tsyos	Ukraine	Track cycling	Women's team sprint
Miguel Ubeto	Venezuela	Road cycling	Men's road race
Rigoberto Urán	Colombia	Road cycling	Men's road race
Rubens Valeriano	Brazil	Mountain biking	Men's cross-country
Alejandro Valverde	Spain	Road cycling	Men's road race
Greg Van Avermaet	Belgium	Road cycling	Men's road race
Gijs van Hoecke	Belgium	Track cycling	Men's omnium
Gijs van Hoecke	Belgium	Track cycling	Men's team pursuit
Kevin van Hoovels	Belgium	Mountain biking	Men's cross-country
Simon van Velthooven	New Zealand	Track cycling	Men's keirin
Simon van Velthooven	New Zealand	Track cycling	Men's team sprint
Stijn Vandenbergh	Belgium	Road cycling	Men's road race
Jessica Varnish	Great Britain	Track cycling	Women's team sprint
Sebastian Vedri	Spain	Track cycling	Men's team pursuit
Rihards Veide	Latvia	BMX	Men's BMX
Jussi Veikkanen	Finland	Road cycling	Men's road race
Tim Veldt	Netherlands	Track cycling	Men's team pursuit
Joseph Veloce	Canada	Track cycling	Men's keirin
Francisco Ventoso	Spain	Road cycling	Men's road race
Mariaesthela Vilera	Venezuela	Track cycling	Women's team sprint
Linda Villumsen	New Zealand	Road cycling	Women's road race
Linda Villumsen	New Zealand	Road cycling	Women's road time trial
Alexander Vinokourov	Kazakhstan	Road cycling	Men's road race
Alexander Vinokourov	Kazakhstan	Road cycling	Men's road time trial
Elia Viviani	Italy	Road cycling	Men's road race
Elia Viviani	Italy	Track cycling	Men's omnium
Annemiek van Vleuten	Netherlands	Road cycling	Women's road race
Kristina Vogel	Germany	Track cycling	Women's sprint
Kristina Vogel	Germany	Track cycling	Women's keirin
Kristina Vogel	Germany	Track cycling	Women's team sprint
Florian Vogel	Switzerland	Mountain biking	Men's cross-country
Christos Volikakis	Greece	Track cycling	Men's keirin
Zafeiris Volikakis	Greece	Track cycling	Men's sprint
Casper von Folsach	Denmark	Track cycling	Men's team pursuit
Marianne Vos	Netherlands	Road cycling	Women's road race
Marianne Vos	Netherlands	Road cycling	Women's road time trial
Sarah Walker	New Zealand	BMX	Women's BMX
Kazunari Watanabe	Japan	Track cycling	Men's keirin
Kazunari Watanabe	Japan	Track cycling	Men's team sprint
Jimmy Watkins	United States	Track cycling	Men's sprint
Todd Wells	United States	Mountain biking	Men's cross-country
Miriam Welte	Germany	Track cycling	Women's team sprint
Lieuwe Westra	Netherlands	Road cycling	Men's road race
Lieuwe Westra	Netherlands	Road cycling	Men's road time trial
Tara Whitten	Canada	Track cycling	Women's omnium
Tara Whitten	Canada	Track cycling	Women's team pursuit
Bradley Wiggins	Great Britain	Road cycling	Men's road race
Bradley Wiggins	Great Britain	Road cycling	Men's road time trial
Kirsten Wild	Netherlands	Track cycling	Women's omnium
Kirsten Wild	Netherlands	Track cycling	Women's team pursuit
Marc Willers	New Zealand	BMX	Men's BMX
Sam Willoughby	Australia	BMX	Men's BMX
Joanna van de Winkel	South Africa	Road cycling	Women's road race
Małgorzata Wojtyra	Poland	Track cycling	Women's omnium
Jamie Wong	Hong Kong	Road cycling	Women's road race
Wong Kam-po	Hong Kong	Road cycling	Men's road race
Trixi Worrack	Germany	Road cycling	Women's road race
Trixi Worrack	Germany	Road cycling	Women's road time trial
Kohei Yamamoto	Japan	Mountain biking	Men's cross-country
Khalen Young	Australia	BMX	Men's BMX
Olga Zabelinskaya	Russia	Road cycling	Women's road race
Olga Zabelinskaya	Russia	Road cycling	Women's road time trial
Amir Zargari	Iran	Road cycling	Men's road race
Damian Zieliński	Poland	Track cycling	Men's sprint
Damian Zieliński	Poland	Track cycling	Men's team sprint
Kristijan Đurasek	Croatia	Road cycling	Men's road race
Jan Škarnitzl	Czech Republic	Mountain biking	Men's cross-country
Denis Špička	Czech Republic	Track cycling	Men's keirin
Janka Števková	Slovakia	Mountain biking	Women's cross-country
Māris Štrombergs	Latvia	BMX	Men's BMX
Tanja Žakelj	Slovenia	Mountain biking	Women's cross-country
Zhang Lei	China	Track cycling	Men's team sprint
Zhang Miao	China	Track cycling	Men's sprint
Zhang Miao	China	Track cycling	Men's keirin
Zhang Miao	China	Track cycling	Men's team sprint
