= 2011 UCI BMX Supercross World Cup =

The UCI BMX Supercross World Cup 2011 is a multi race tournament over a season of BMX racing. The season runs from 8 April to 1 October 2011. The World Cup is organised by the Union Cycliste Internationale. In this edition the World Cup consists of four rounds in Pietermaritburg, Papendal, London and Chula Vista.

== Series ==
The 2011 World Cup series was made up of five events. The series featured rounds in Pietermaritzburg, Papaendal, London, Sarasota and Chula Vista. However, in July Sarasota had to pull out of hosting a round leaving the series with just four stops in 2011.

=== London ===
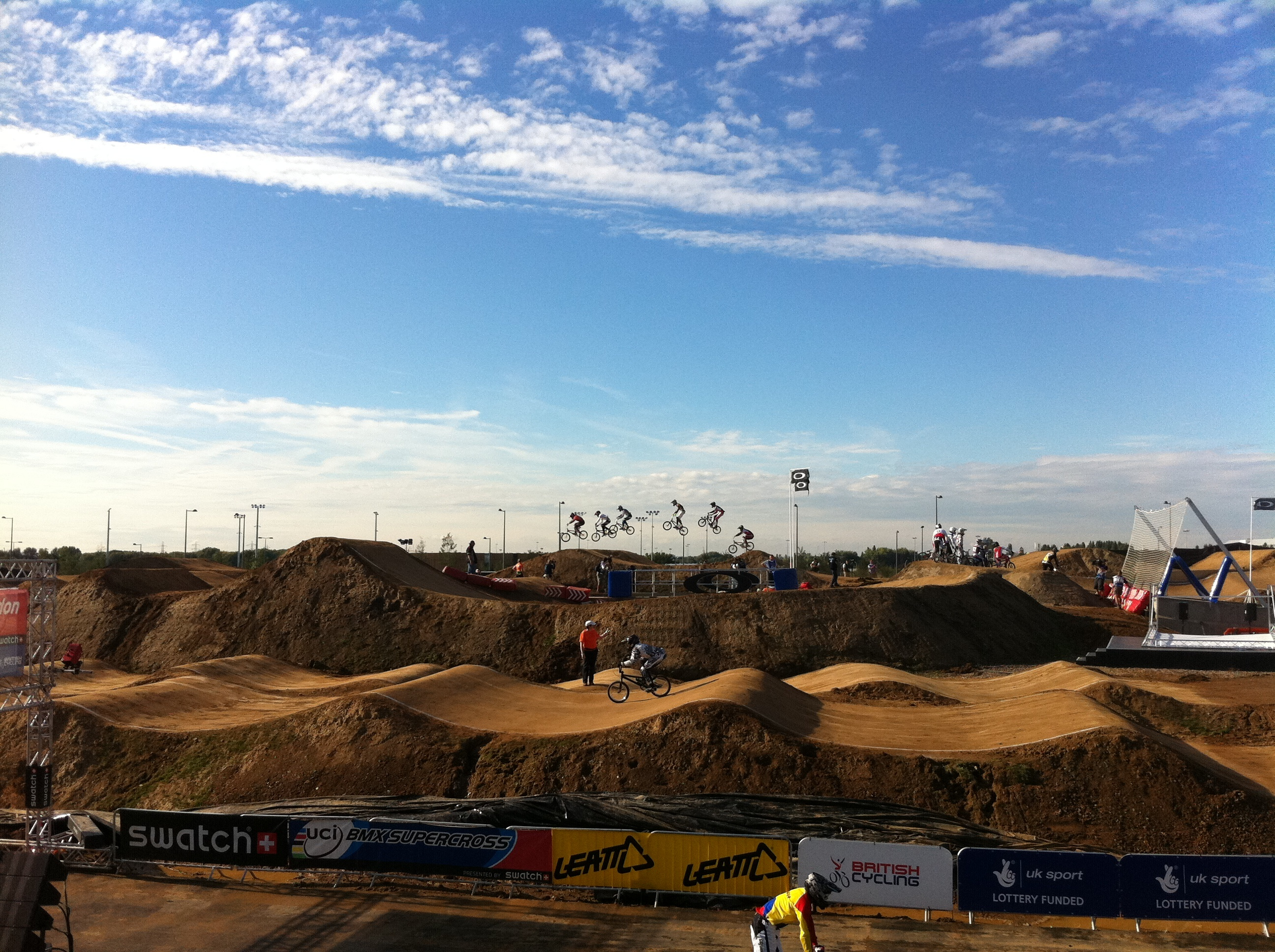
London BMX track during the World Cup

160 riders signed up to tackle the challenging Olympic course. The event was one of the first events to take place in the Olympic Park and is part of the London Prepares series. The track is 470 metres long for men and features a berm jump, an S-bend transfer, a box jump and a rhythm section in the final straight. The women's course is 430 metres long featuring three jumps in the opening straight and a tunnel, before like the men's course, including a rhythm section in the final straight. It has been called one of the most challenging BMX tracks to date. The track also features an 8-metre-high (26 ft) starting ramp and was designed by the UCI with the aim of pushing the boundaries of the sport. 14,000 cubic metres of soil was used to build the track.

Home favourite Shanaze Reade and New Zealander Marc Willers took the win in London after a long delay for rain. Rain fell for three hours, meaning that the racing did not get under way until 17:00 local time. However the crowd remained and due to the rain, racing was an elimination, do or die, one run, one chance with the top four from each heat qualifying into the next round. In the final Willers did battle with Sam Willoughby and World Champion Joris Daudet with the pair of them passing him on the Red Bull (box) jump before Willers fought back down the rhythm section to pass the pair of them and to take the London round.

== Results ==
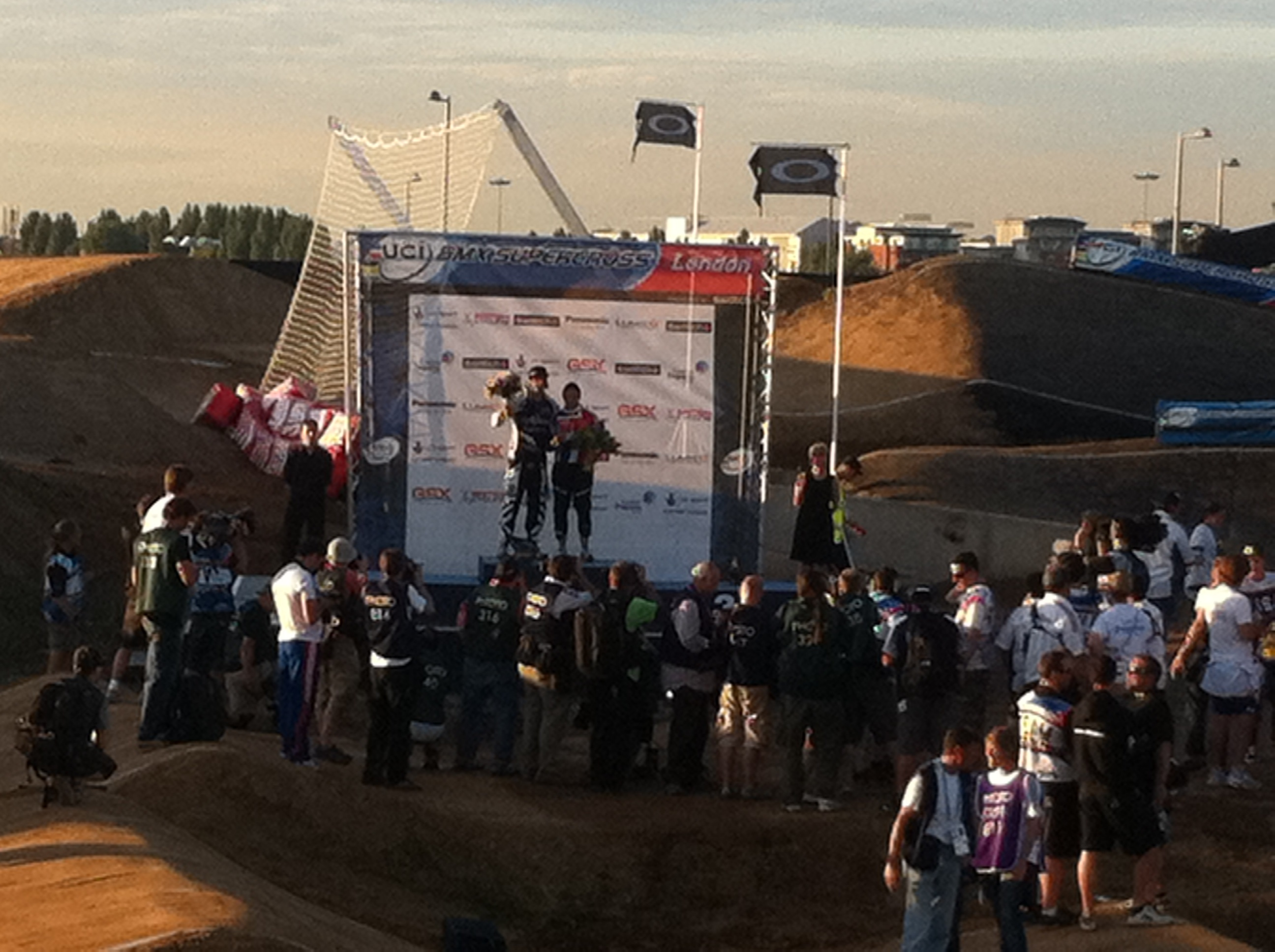
Marc Willers and Shanaze Reade on the podium in London

Event	Winner	Second	Third
South Africa, Pietermaritzburg — 8–9 April 2011
Time Trial Supefinal Men	Joris Daudet (FRA)	Raymon van der Biezen (NED)	Tory Nyhaug (CAN)
Time Trial Supefinal Women	Manon Valentino (FRA)	Sarah Walker (NZL)	Mariana Pajón (COL)
Men	Corben Sharrah (USA)	Khalen Young (AUS)	Joris Daudet (FRA)
Women	Manon Valentino (FRA)	Gabriela Díaz (ARG)	Sarah Walker (NZL)
Netherlands, Papendal — 27–28 May 2011
Time Trial Supefinal Men	Jelle van Gorkom (NED)	Raymon van der Biezen (NED)	Joris Daudet (FRA)
Time Trial Supefinal Women	Romana Labounková (CZE)	Sarah Walker (NZL)	Magalie Pottier (FRA)
Men	Marc Willers (NZL)	Jelle van Gorkom (NED)	Joris Daudet (FRA)
Women	Sarah Walker (NZL)	Romana Labounková (CZE)	Caroline Buchanan (AUS)
Great Britain, London — 19–20 August 2011
Time Trial Supefinal Men	Sam Willoughby (AUS)	Joris Daudet (FRA)	Sylvain André (FRA)
Time Trial Supefinal Women	Magalie Pottier (FRA)	Lauren Reynolds (AUS)	Shanaze Reade (GBR)
Men	Marc Willers (NZL)	Joris Daudet (FRA)	Nicholas Long (USA)
Women	Shanaze Reade (GBR)	Sarah Walker (NZL)	Lauren Reynolds (AUS)
United States, Chula Vista — 30 September – 1 October 2011
Time Trial Supefinal Men	Connor Fields (USA)	Tory Nyhaug (CAN)	Raymon van der Biezen (NED)
Time Trial Supefinal Women	Brooke Crain (USA)	Mariana Pajón (COL)	Arielle Martin (USA)
Men	Connor Fields (USA)	Raymon van der Biezen (NED)	David Herman (USA)
Women	Arielle Martin (USA)	Brooke Crain (USA)	Mariana Pajón (COL)

== See also ==
- 2013 UCI BMX Supercross World Cup
