= Colombia at the 2012 Summer Olympics =

- IOC code: COL
- NOC: Colombian Olympic Committee
- Website: www.olimpicocol.co (in Spanish)

in London
- Competitors: 104 in 18 sports
- Flag bearers: Mariana Pajón (opening and closing)
- Medals Ranked 38th: Gold 1 Silver 3 Bronze 5 Total 9

Summer Olympics appearances (overview)
- 1932; 1936; 1948; 1952; 1956; 1960; 1964; 1968; 1972; 1976; 1980; 1984; 1988; 1992; 1996; 2000; 2004; 2008; 2012; 2016; 2020; 2024

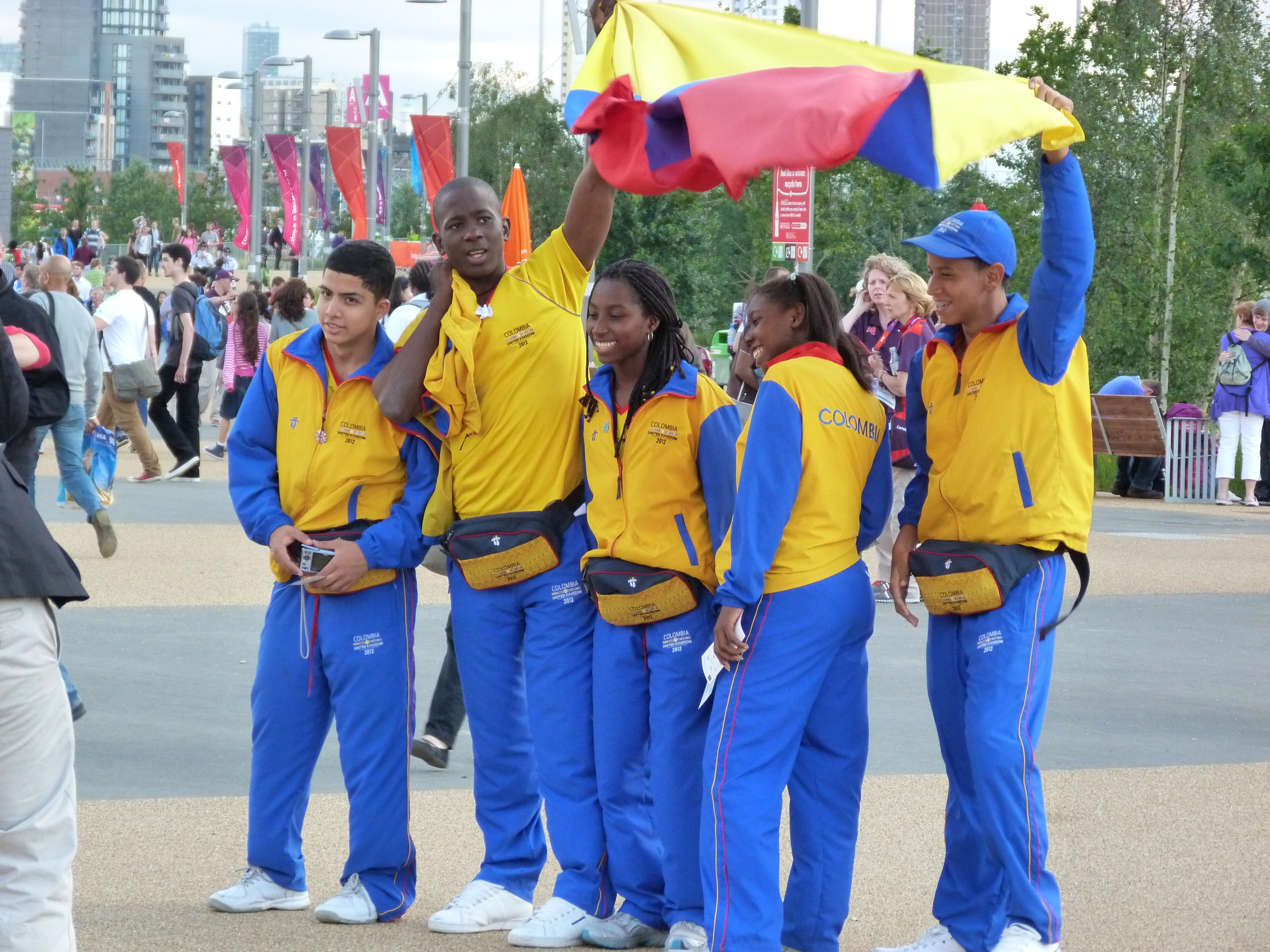
Colombian competitors at the Olympic Park.

Colombia competed at the 2012 Summer Olympics in London, from 27 July to 12 August 2012. This was the nation's eighteenth appearance at the Olympics, having not competed at the 1952 Summer Olympics in Helsinki.

Comité Olímpico Colombiano sent the nation's largest delegation to the Games, surpassing the record by having more than a quarter more athletes than represented Colombia in Beijing. A total of 104 athletes, 48 men and 56 women, competed in 18 sports. Women's football was the only team-based sport in which Colombia was represented in these Olympic Games. There was only a single competitor in fencing, shooting, table tennis, taekwondo and triathlon.

This was Colombia's most successful Olympics (until Rio 2016), winning a total of eight medals (one gold, three silver, and four bronze). BMX rider and world champion Mariana Pajón, who was Colombia's flag bearer at the opening ceremony, won the nation's first gold medal since the 2000 Summer Olympics. Freestyle wrestler Jackeline Rentería became the first Colombian female athlete to claim two Olympic medals, while triple jumper Caterine Ibargüen won the nation's second medal in the track and field after 20 years. Other notable accomplishments included the nation's first ever Olympic medals in road cycling, judo and taekwondo.

== Medalists ==
Medal	Name	Sport	Event	Date
Gold	Mariana Pajón	Cycling	Women's BMX	10 August
Silver	Rigoberto Urán	Cycling	Men's road race	28 July
Silver	Óscar Figueroa	Weightlifting	Men's 62 kg	30 July
Silver	Caterine Ibargüen	Athletics	Women's triple jump	5 August
Bronze	Yuri Alvear	Judo	Women's 70 kg	1 August
Bronze	Ubaldina Valoyes	Weightlifting	Women's 69 kg	1 August
Bronze	Óscar Muñoz	Taekwondo	Men's 58 kg	8 August
Bronze	Jackeline Rentería	Wrestling	Women's freestyle 55 kg	9 August
Bronze	Carlos Oquendo	Cycling	Men's BMX	10 August

Medals by sport
Sport	1st place, gold medalist(s)	2nd place, silver medalist(s)	3rd place, bronze medalist(s)	Total
Cycling	1	1	1	3
Weightlifting	0	1	1	2
Athletics	0	1	0	1
Judo	0	0	1	1
Taekwondo	0	0	1	1
Wrestling	0	0	1	1
Total	1	3	5	9

Medals by gender
Gender	1st place, gold medalist(s)	2nd place, silver medalist(s)	3rd place, bronze medalist(s)	Total	Percentage
Female	1	1	3	5	55%
Male	0	2	2	4	45%
Mixed	0	0	0	0	0%
Total	1	3	5	9	100%

== Competitors ==
Sport	Men	Women	Total
Archery	1	1	2
Athletics	11	20	31
Boxing	3	0	3
Cycling	12	5	17
Diving	2	0	2
Equestrian	2	0	2
Fencing	0	1	1
Football	0	18	18
Gymnastics	1	1	2
Judo	0	2	2
Sailing	2	0	2
Shooting	1	0	1
Swimming	2	1	3
Table tennis	0	1	1
Taekwondo	1	0	1
Tennis	3	1	4
Triathlon	1	0	1
Weightlifting	4	4	8
Wrestling	0	3	3
Total	46	58	104

== Archery ==
Colombia has qualified for the following events

Athlete	Event	Ranking round		Round of 64	Round of 32	Round of 16	Quarterfinals	Semifinals	Final / BM	
Athlete	Event	Score	Seed	Opposition Score	Opposition Score	Opposition Score	Opposition Score	Opposition Score	Opposition Score	Rank
Daniel Pineda	Men's individual	664	32	Wang C-p (TPE) (33); L 0–6	Did not advance					
Ana Rendón	Women's individual	657	12	Grandal (ESP) (53); L 2–6	Did not advance					

== Athletics ==
Colombian athletes have so far achieved qualifying standards in the following athletics events (up to a maximum of 3 athletes in each event at the 'A' Standard, and 1 at the 'B' Standard):

Key

- Note – Ranks given for track events are within the athlete's heat only
- Q = Qualified for the next round
- q = Qualified for the next round as a fastest loser or, in field events, by position without achieving the qualifying target
- NR = National record
- N/A = Round not applicable for the event
- Bye = Athlete not required to compete in round

Men
Track & road events

Athlete	Event	Heat		Quarterfinal		Semifinal		Final	
Athlete	Event	Result	Rank	Result	Rank	Result	Rank	Result	Rank
Éider Arévalo	20 km walk	—N/a						1:22:00	20
Juan Carlos Cardona	Marathon	—N/a						2:40:13	83
Fredy Hernández	50 km walk	—N/a						3:56:00	33
Luis Fernando Lopez	20 km walk	—N/a						DSQ	
Isidro Montoya	100 m	Bye		10.54	7	Did not advance			
Diego Palomeque	400 m	Excluded (for doping test)*							
James Rendón	20 km walk	—N/a						1:22:54	28
Rafith Rodríguez	800 m	1:47.70	4	—N/a		Did not advance			
Paulo Villar	110 m hurdles	13.55	5 q	—N/a		13.63	7	Did not advance	

* Palomeque was initially suspended and later excluded from the games after testing positive for exogenous testosterone.

Field events

Athlete	Event	Qualification		Final	
Athlete	Event	Distance	Position	Distance	Position
Wanner Miller	High jump	2.26	=12 q	2.25	9
Dayron Márquez	Javelin throw	77.59	26	Did not advance	

Women
Track & road events

Athlete	Event	Heat		Quarterfinal		Semifinal		Final	
Athlete	Event	Result	Rank	Result	Rank	Result	Rank	Result	Rank
Erika Abril	Marathon	—N/a						2:33:33	51
Sandra Arenas	20 km walk	—N/a						1:33:21	32
Yolanda Caballero	Marathon	—N/a						DNF	
Ángela Figueroa	3000 m steeplechase	10:25.60	15	—N/a				Did not advance	
Lina Flórez	100 m hurdles	13.17	6	—N/a		Did not advance			
Rosibel García	800 m	2:01.30	3 Q	—N/a		2:00.16	3	Did not advance	
Norma González	200 m	23.46	7	—N/a		Did not advance			
Ingrid Hernández	20 km walk	—N/a						1:33:34	34
Yomara Hinestroza	100 m	Bye		11.56	7	Did not advance			
Brigitte Merlano	100 m hurdles	13.21	6	—N/a		Did not advance			
Princesa Oliveros	400 m hurdles	58.95	8	—N/a		Did not advance			
Arabelly Orjuela	20 km walk	—N/a						1:35:05	43
Jennifer Padilla	400 m	DSQ		—N/a		Did not advance			
Nelcy Caicedo; Norma González; Yomara Hinestroza; María Alejandra Idrobo; Darlenys Obregón; Eliecith Palacios	4 × 100 m relay	43.21	5	—N/a				Did not advance	

Field events

Athlete	Event	Qualification		Final	
Athlete	Event	Distance	Position	Distance	Position
Sandra Lemos	Shot put	16.50	28	Did not advance	
Caterine Ibargüen	Triple jump	14.42	4 Q	14.80	2nd place, silver medalist(s)
Johana Moreno	Hammer throw	68.53	18	Did not advance	
Flor Ruiz	Javelin throw	54.34	32	Did not advance	

== Boxing ==
Colombia has qualified boxers in the following events.

Men

Athlete	Event	Round of 32	Round of 16	Quarterfinals	Semifinals	Final	
Athlete	Event	Opposition Result	Opposition Result	Opposition Result	Opposition Result	Opposition Result	Rank
Eduar Marriaga	Lightweight	Arias (DOM); L 8–17	Did not advance				
César Villarraga	Light welterweight	Iglesias (CUB); L 9-20	Did not advance				
Jeysson Monrroy	Light heavyweight	Rouzbahani (IRI); L 10–12	Did not advance				

== Cycling ==
Colombia has so far qualified cyclists for the following events

=== Road ===
Colombia has qualified three places in the men's road race, subsequently filled by Fabio Duarte, Sergio Henao, and Rigoberto Urán. Urán only competed in Beijing before, but was unable to finish the race. The route for the race was 250 km (155.3 mi) in length and included nine climbs of the famous Box Hill. A large breakaway – which at its peak contained 32 riders – formed off the front of the peloton early on in the race. No Colombians were part of the initial move, but Henao and Urán joined later on in the race. The peloton, led by the Great Britain Team, kept the breakaway relatively closer for the latter 100 km (62.1 mi) of the race. As the race reached its end, however, the peloton could not close the gap to the large leading breakaway. Clearly, the breakaway would contain the eventual winner, and as the breakaway went under 10 km (6.2 mi) to go in the race, the riders began to attack. Urán and Kazakhstan's Alexander Vinokourov were the first two riders to mount a sizeable distance between the main breakaway and themselves. As Urán and Vinokourov worked together to stay away, the main breakaway did not work collectively to pull back the two leading riders. With 200 meters left in the race, Urán swept across to the left side of the road until Vinokourov's attack became good enough to win the race. Urán, however, crossed the line in second place, earning him the silver medal. Sergio Henao crossed the line in sixteenth place with the main breakaway, while the other Colombian Fabio Duarte did not finish the course.

Athlete	Event	Time	Rank
Fabio Duarte	Men's road race	Did not finish	
Fabio Duarte	Men's time trial	57:34:20	35
Sergio Henao	Men's road race	5:46:05	16
Rigoberto Urán	Men's road race	5:45:57	2nd place, silver medalist(s)

=== Track ===
Sprint

Athlete	Event	Qualification		Round 1	Repechage 1	Round 2	Repechage 2	Quarterfinals	Semifinals	Final	
Athlete	Event	Time Speed (km/h)	Rank	Opposition Time Speed (km/h)	Opposition Time Speed (km/h)	Opposition Time Speed (km/h)	Opposition Time Speed (km/h)	Opposition Time Speed (km/h)	Opposition Time Speed (km/h)	Opposition Time Speed (km/h)	Rank
Juliana Gaviria	Women's sprint	11.376; 63.291	13	Guerra (CUB); L	Hansen (NZL); Gnidenko (RUS); L	Did not advance					

Team sprint

Athlete	Event	Qualification		Semifinals		Final	
Athlete	Event	Time Speed (km/h)	Rank	Opposition Time Speed (km/h)	Rank	Opposition Time Speed (km/h)	Rank
Juliana Gaviria; Diana García	Women's team sprint	34.870; 51.620	10	Did not advance			

Pursuit

Athlete	Event	Qualification		Semifinals		Final	
Athlete	Event	Time	Rank	Opponent Results	Rank	Opponent Results	Rank
Juan Esteban Arango; Edwin Ávila; Arles Castro; Weimar Roldán; Kevin Ríos	Men's team pursuit	4:03.712	7 Q	Spain; 4:05.485	8	Netherlands; 4:04.772	8

Keirin

Athlete	Event	1st Round	Repechage	2nd Round	Final
Athlete	Event	Rank	Rank	Rank	Rank
Fabián Puerta	Men's keirin	3 R	5	Did not advance	15
Juliana Gaviria	Women's keirin	4 R	6	Did not advance	17

Omnium

Athlete	Event	Flying lap		Points race		Elimination race	Individual pursuit		Scratch race	Time trial		Total points	Rank
Athlete	Event	Time	Rank	Points	Rank	Rank	Time	Rank	Rank	Time	Rank	Total points	Rank
Juan Esteban Arango	Men's omnium	13.469	8	−18	17	13	4:25.477	4	11	1:03.793	7	60	10
María Luisa Calle	Women's omnium	15.559	18	22	8	14	3:40.349	7	11	37.937	18	76	16

=== Mountain biking ===
Athlete	Event	Time	Rank
Leonardo Páez	Men's cross-country	1:36:02	28
Laura Abril	Women's cross-country	Did not finish	

=== BMX ===
Athlete	Event	Seeding		Quarterfinal		Semifinal		Final	
Athlete	Event	Result	Rank	Points	Rank	Points	Rank	Result	Rank
Andrés Jiménez	Men's BMX	38.445	5	17	4 q	12	4 Q	53.377	6
Carlos Oquendo	Men's BMX	38.775	14	21	4 q	11	4 Q	38.251	3rd place, bronze medalist(s)
Mariana Pajón	Women's BMX	38.787	3	—N/a		3	1 Q	37.706	1st place, gold medalist(s)

== Diving ==
Colombia has qualified in the following events.

Men

Athlete	Event	Preliminaries		Semifinals		Final	
Athlete	Event	Points	Rank	Points	Rank	Points	Rank
Sebastián Villa	3 m springboard	414.90	21	Did not advance			
Víctor Ortega	10 m platform	450.60	13 Q	439.55	17	Did not advance	
Sebastián Villa	10 m platform	419.25	22	Did not advance			

== Equestrian ==
=== Jumping ===
Colombia has qualified two individual quota places through the 2011 Pan American Games

Athlete	Horse	Event	Qualification								Final					Total	
Athlete	Horse	Event	Round 1		Round 2			Round 3			Round A		Round B			Total	
Athlete	Horse	Event	Penalties	Rank	Penalties	Total	Rank	Penalties	Total	Rank	Penalties	Rank	Penalties	Total	Rank	Penalties	Rank
Daniel Bluman	Sancha	Individual	0	=1 Q	1	1	=13 Q	4	5	=7 Q	4	=11 Q	9	13	20	13	20
Rodrigo Díaz	Royal Vincken	Individual	1	=33 Q	10	11	53	Did not advance								11	53

== Fencing ==
Colombia has qualified 1 fencer.

Women

Athlete	Event	Round of 64	Round of 32	Round of 16	Quarterfinal	Semifinal	Final / BM	
Athlete	Event	Opposition Score	Opposition Score	Opposition Score	Opposition Score	Opposition Score	Opposition Score	Rank
Saskia Loretta van Erven Garcia	Individual foil	Bye	Golubystkyi (GER); L 9–14	Did not advance				

== Football ==
The Colombian women's football team are qualified for the event.

- Women's team event – 1 team of 18 players

=== Women's tournament ===
Team roster

Head coach: Ricardo Rozo

Colombia named a squad of 18 players and 4 alternates for the tournament.

No.	Pos.	Player	Date of birth (age)	Caps	Goals	Club
1	GK	Stefany Castaño	11 January 1994 (aged 18)	0	0	(United States Soccer Federation) Graceland University
2	MF	Tatiana Ariza	21 February 1991 (aged 21)	12	2	(United States Soccer Federation) Austin Peay State University
3	DF	Natalia Gaitán (captain)	3 April 1991 (aged 21)	5	0	(United States Soccer Federation) University of Toledo
4	DF	Natalia Ariza	21 February 1991 (aged 21)	2	0	(United States Soccer Federation) Austin Peay State University
5	DF	Nataly Arias	2 April 1986 (aged 26)	16	3	(United States Soccer Federation) University of Maryland
6	MF	Daniela Montoya	22 August 1990 (aged 21)	11	1	(Colombian Football Federation) CD Formas Íntimas
7	FW	Oriánica Velásquez	1 August 1989 (aged 22)	13	1	(United States Soccer Federation) Indiana University
8	MF	Yoreli Rincón	27 July 1993 (aged 18)	14	8	(Colombian Football Federation) CD Gol Star
9	MF	Carmen Rodallega	15 July 1983 (aged 29)	34	6	(Colombian Football Federation) CD Carlos Sarmiento Lora
10	MF	Catalina Usme	25 December 1989 (aged 22)	20	14	(Colombian Football Federation) Independiente Medellín
11	MF	Liana Salazar	16 September 1992 (aged 19)	13	0	(United States Soccer Federation) University of Kansas
12	GK	Sandra Sepúlveda	3 March 1988 (aged 24)	16	0	(Colombian Football Federation) CD Formas Íntimas
13	DF	Yulieth Domínguez	6 September 1993 (aged 18)	17	3	(Colombian Football Federation) Estudiantes F.C.
14	DF	Kelis Peduzine	21 April 1983 (aged 29)	23	2	(Colombian Football Federation) CD Eba
15	FW	Ingrid Vidal	22 April 1991 (aged 21)	18	5	(Colombian Football Federation) CD Generaciones Palmiranas
16	FW	Lady Andrade	10 January 1992 (aged 20)	8	1	(Colombian Football Federation) CD Inter de Bogotá
17	FW	Melissa Ortiz	24 January 1990 (aged 22)	0	0	(United States Soccer Federation) Lynn University
18	MF	Ana María Montoya	24 September 1991 (aged 20)	0	0	(United States Soccer Federation) University of Arizona

Group play

Pos	Team	Pld	W	D	L	GF	GA	GD	Pts	Qualification
1	United States	3	3	0	0	8	2	+6	9	Qualified for the quarter-finals
2	France	3	2	0	1	8	4	+4	6	Qualified for the quarter-finals
3	North Korea	3	1	0	2	2	6	−4	3	
4	Colombia	3	0	0	3	0	6	−6	0	

Source: IOC
25 July 2012
20:50 †

Colombia	0–2	North Korea
	Report	Kim Song-hui 39', 85'

Hampden Park, Glasgow
Attendance: 18,900
Referee: Carol Anne Chenard (Canada)

28 July 2012
17:00

United States	3–0	Colombia
Rapinoe 33'; Wambach 74'; Lloyd 77'	Report

Hampden Park, Glasgow
Attendance: 11,313
Referee: Efthalia Mitsi (Greece)

31 July 2012
17:15

France	1–0	Colombia
Thomis 5'	Report

St James' Park, Newcastle
Attendance: 13,184
Referee: Quetzalli Alvarado (Mexico)

== Gymnastics ==
=== Artistic ===
Men

Athlete	Event	Qualification								Final							
Athlete	Event	Apparatus						Total	Rank	Apparatus						Total	Rank
Athlete	Event	F	PH	R	V	PB	HB	Total	Rank	F	PH	R	V	PB	HB	Total	Rank
Jorge Hugo Giraldo	All-around	13.400	12.166	14.933	15.466	13.633	13.500	83.098	33	Did not advance							

Women

Athlete	Event	Qualification						Final					
Athlete	Event	Apparatus				Total	Rank	Apparatus				Total	Rank
Athlete	Event	V	UB	BB	F	Total	Rank	V	UB	BB	F	Total	Rank
Jessica Gil	All-around	13.533	12.633	12.266	13.066	51.498	42	Did not advance					

== Judo ==
Athlete	Event	Round of 32	Round of 16	Quarterfinals	Semifinals	Repechage	Final / BM	
Athlete	Event	Opposition Result	Opposition Result	Opposition Result	Opposition Result	Opposition Result	Opposition Result	Rank
Yadinis Amaris	Women's −57 kg	Bye	Malloy (USA); L 0000–1000	Did not advance				
Yuri Alvear	Women's −70 kg	Portela (BRA); W 1100–0000	Moreira (ANG); W 0100–0001	Décosse (FRA); L 0000–1000	Did not advance	Sraka (SLO); W 0100–0001	Chen F (CHN); W 0011–0001	3rd place, bronze medalist(s)

== Sailing ==
Colombia has so far qualified 1 boat for each of the following events

Men

Athlete	Event	Race											Net points	Final rank
Athlete	Event	1	2	3	4	5	6	7	8	9	10	M*	Net points	Final rank
Santiago Grillo	RS:X	35	34	34	33	~~DSQ~~	37	30	36	DNF	31	EL	302	37
Andrey Quintero	Laser	40	31	37	25	39	41	36	39	~~DNF~~	37	EL	325	40

M = Medal race; EL = Eliminated – did not advance into the medal race

== Shooting ==
Colombia has qualified 1 shooter

Men

Athlete	Event	Qualification		Final	
Athlete	Event	Points	Rank	Points	Rank
Danilo Caro	Trap	115	29	Did not advance	

== Swimming ==
Colombia has qualified one athlete so far to compete in swimming by making the A standard. Another athlete completed its nation's full roster by achieving their respective Olympic Selection time (up to a maximum of 2 swimmers in each event at the Olympic Qualifying Time (OQT), and potentially 1 at the Olympic Selection Time (OST)):

Men

Athlete	Event	Heat		Semifinal		Final	
Athlete	Event	Time	Rank	Time	Rank	Time	Rank
Mateo de Angulo	400 m freestyle	3:57.76	26	—N/a		Did not advance	
Omar Pinzón	100 m backstroke	55.37	32	Did not advance			
Omar Pinzón	200 m backstroke	1:58.20	15 Q	1:58.99	16	Did not advance	
Omar Pinzón	200 m butterfly	2:02.32	34	Did not advance			

Women

Athlete	Event	Heat		Semifinal		Final	
Athlete	Event	Time	Rank	Time	Rank	Time	Rank
Carolina Colorado Henao	100 m backstroke	1:01.81	28	Did not advance			
Carolina Colorado Henao	200 m backstroke	2:13.64	27	Did not advance			

== Table tennis ==
Colombia qualified one athlete.

Athlete	Event	Preliminary round	Round 1	Round 2	Round 3	Round 4	Quarterfinals	Semifinals	Final / BM	
Athlete	Event	Opposition Result	Opposition Result	Opposition Result	Opposition Result	Opposition Result	Opposition Result	Opposition Result	Opposition Result	Rank
Paula Medina	Women's singles	Bye	Bilenko (UKR); L 1–4	Did not advance						

== Taekwondo ==
Colombia has qualified 1 man.

Athlete	Event	Round of 16	Quarterfinals	Semifinals	Repechage	Bronze Medal	Final	
Athlete	Event	Opposition Result	Opposition Result	Opposition Result	Opposition Result	Opposition Result	Opposition Result	Rank
Óscar Muñoz	Men's −58 kg	El-Yamine (ALG); W 1–8	Al-Kubati (YEM); W 14–2 PTG	González (ESP); L 13–4	Bye	Karaket (THA); W 4–6	Did not advance	3rd place, bronze medalist(s)

== Tennis ==
Colombia has qualified four tennis players.

Athlete	Event	Round of 64	Round of 32	Round of 16	Quarterfinals	Semifinals	Final / BM	
Athlete	Event	Opposition Score	Opposition Score	Opposition Score	Opposition Score	Opposition Score	Opposition Score	Rank
Alejandro Falla	Men's singles	Federer (SUI); L 3–6, 7–5, 3–6	Did not advance					
Santiago Giraldo	Men's singles	Harrison (USA); W 7–5, 6–3	Darcis (BEL); L 7–6^{(7–4)}, 4–6, 4–6	Did not advance				
Juan Sebastián Cabal; Santiago Giraldo	Men's doubles	—N/a	Čilić / Dodig (CRO); L 3–6, 4–6	Did not advance				
Mariana Duque Mariño	Women's singles	Kirilenko (RUS); L 0–6, 1–1^{r}	Did not advance					

== Triathlon ==
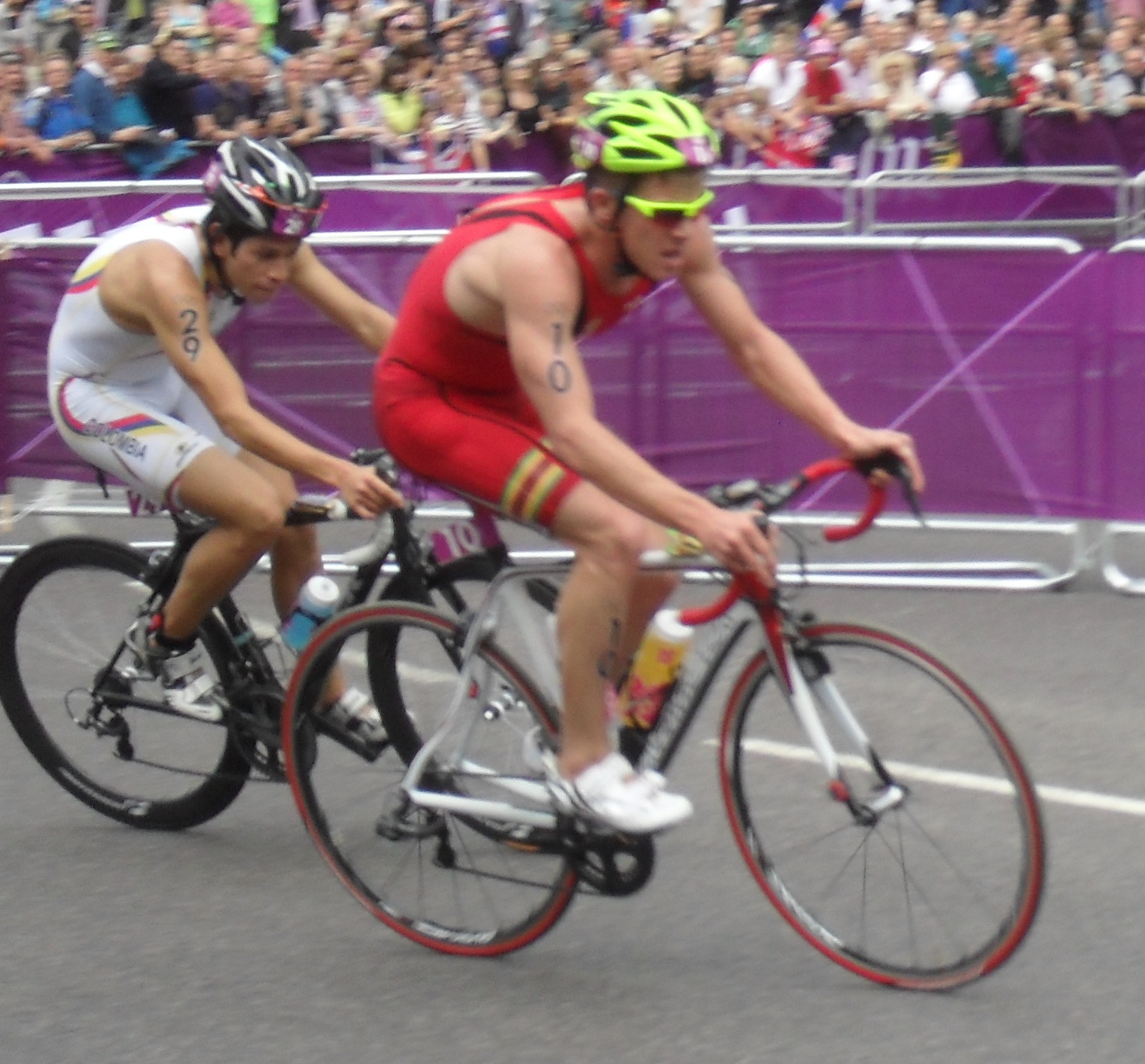
Carlos Quinchara, in white, during the triathlon.

Athlete	Event	Swim (1.5 km)	Trans 1	Bike (40 km)	Trans 2	Run (10 km)	Total Time	Rank
Carlos Quinchara	Men's	18:02	0:47	59:37	0:31	35:13	1:54:10	53

== Weightlifting ==
Colombia has qualified 4 men and 4 women.

Men

Athlete	Event	Snatch		Clean & Jerk		Total	Rank
Athlete	Event	Result	Rank	Result	Rank	Total	Rank
Carlos Berna	−56 kg	118	10	150	7	268	8
Sergio Rada	−56 kg	118	10	151	6	269	7
Óscar Figueroa	−62 kg	140	3	177	1	317	2nd place, silver medalist(s)
Doyler Sánchez	−69 kg	138	14	170	13	308	14

Women

Athlete	Event	Snatch		Clean & Jerk		Total	Rank
Athlete	Event	Result	Rank	Result	Rank	Total	Rank
Rusmeri Villar	−53 kg	87	7	108	8	195	6
Jackelin Heredia	−58 kg	100	9	125	9	225	10
Lina Rivas	−58 kg	103	4	~~120~~	DNF	103	DNF
Ubaldina Valoyes	−69 kg	111	3	135	4	246	3rd place, bronze medalist(s)

== Wrestling ==
Colombia has qualified three quota place.

Key

- VT – Victory by Fall.
- PP – Decision by Points – the loser with technical points.
- PO – Decision by Points – the loser without technical points.

Women's freestyle

Athlete	Event	Qualification	Round of 16	Quarterfinal	Semifinal	Repechage 1	Repechage 2	Final / BM	
Athlete	Event	Opposition Result	Opposition Result	Opposition Result	Opposition Result	Opposition Result	Opposition Result	Opposition Result	Rank
Carolina Castillo	−48 kg	Otgontsetseg (MGL); L 0–3 ^{PO}	Did not advance						11
Jackeline Rentería	−55 kg	Bye	Kum O-H (PRK); W 3–1 ^{PP}	Antes (ECU); W 3–1 ^{PP}	Verbeek (CAN); L 0–3 ^{PO}	Bye		Lazareva (UKR); W 3–1 ^{PP}	3rd place, bronze medalist(s)
Ana Talia Betancur	−72 kg	Bye	Unda (ESP); L 0–3 ^{PO}	Did not advance					17

== See also ==
- Colombia at the 2011 Pan American Games
