= Cycling at the 2012 Summer Olympics – Men's BMX =

Men's BMX at the Games of the XXX Olympiad
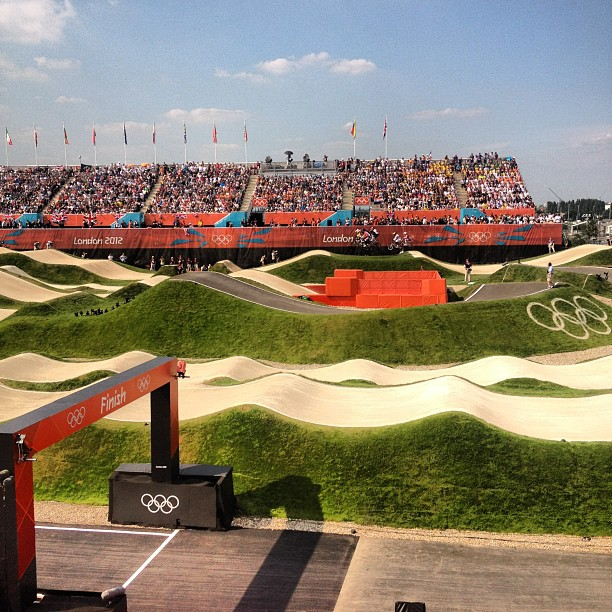
- The BMX track at the Velopark
- Venue: London Velopark
- Date: 8 to 10 August
- Competitors: 32 from 19 nations
- Winning time: 37.576 s

Medalists
1st place, gold medalist(s)		Māris Štrombergs	Latvia
2nd place, silver medalist(s)		Sam Willoughby	Australia
3rd place, bronze medalist(s)		Carlos Oquendo	Colombia

The men's BMX racing competition at the 2012 Olympic Games in London took place at the BMX track at the Velopark within the Olympic Park, from 8 to 10 August.

Latvia's Māris Štrombergs won the gold medal, successfully defending his victory in 2008, with a time of 37.576 seconds. Sam Willoughby, representing Australia, won silver and Carlos Oquendo from Colombia took the bronze.

== Competition format ==
The riders were seeded into four quarter-finals based on a time trial. Each of the four quarter-finals comprised five runs, using a point-for-place system. The top two riders after three runs advanced to the semi-finals (without having to finish the remaining two rides), in addition the top two remaining riders progressed after the full five runs. The semi-finals consisted of three runs, with the top four in each group advancing to the final. The final was a one-run contest.

== Schedule ==
All times are British Summer Time (UTC+1)

Date	Time	Round
Wednesday 8 August 2012	15:00	Qualification
Thursday 9 August 2012	15:00	Quarterfinals
Friday 10 August 2012	16:40	Semi-finals and final

== Results ==
=== Seeding run ===
Rank	Name	Country	Time	Notes
1	Raymon van der Biezen	Netherlands	37.779	
2	Joris Daudet	France	38.221	
3	Twan van Gendt	Netherlands	38.339	
4	Connor Fields	United States	38.431	
5	Andrés Jiménez	Colombia	38.445	
6	Sam Willoughby	Australia	38.496	
7	Nicholas Long	United States	38.601	
8	Renato Rezende	Brazil	38.628	
9	Quentin Caleyron	France	38.637	
10	Marc Willers	New Zealand	38.687	
11	Māris Štrombergs	Latvia	38.697	
12	Liam Phillips	Great Britain	38.719	
13	Rihards Veide	Latvia	38.753	
14	Carlos Oquendo	Colombia	38.775	
15	David Herman	United States	38.955	
16	Kurt Pickard	New Zealand	39.057	
17	Khalen Young	Australia	39.304	
18	Manuel de Vecchi	Italy	39.385	
19	Luis Brethauer	Germany	39.431	
20	Tory Nyhaug	Canada	39.515	
21	Jelle van Gorkom	Netherlands	39.529	
22	Brian Kirkham	Australia	39.610	
23	Roger Rinderknecht	Switzerland	39.618	
24	Emilio Falla	Ecuador	39.737	
25	Morten Therkildsen	Denmark	39.738	
26	Ernesto Pizarro	Argentina	39.765	
27	Arnaud Dubois	Belgium	39.772	
28	Moana Moo Caille	France	40.015	
29	Maik Baier	Germany	40.231	
30	Sifiso Nhlapo	South Africa	40.788	
31	Daniel Caluag	Philippines	40.900	
–	Edžus Treimanis	Latvia		DNF

=== Quarter-finals ===
==== Heat 1 ====
Rank	Name	1st run	2nd run	3rd run	4th run	5th run	Total	Notes
1	Raymon van der Biezen (NED)	37.974 (1)	38.269 (1)	38.392 (1)	Advanced		3	Q
2	Edžus Treimanis (LAT)	40.130 (4)	52.014 (6)	38.572 (2)	Advanced		12	Q
3	Quentin Caleyron (FRA)	42.560 (7)	41.336 (5)	1:04.609 (5)	39.162 (1)	38.489 (1)	19	q
4	Khalen Young (AUS)	DNF (8)	39.189 (2)	39.456 (3)	39.484 (2)	1:04.756 (4)	19	q
5	Morten Therkildsen (DEN)	40.789 (6)	39.788 (4)	39.896 (4)	40.160 (4)	39.104 (2)	20	
6	Emilio Falla (ECU)	39.602 (3)	DNF (8)	1:31.130 (6)	39.756 (3)	41.793 (3)	23	
7	Kurt Pickard (NZL)	40.200 (5)	39.539 (3)	DNF (7)	DNS (8)	DNS (8)	31	
8	Renato Rezende (BRA)	38.343 (2)	DNF (8)	DNS (10)	DNS (8)	DNS (8)	36	

==== Heat 2 ====
Rank	Name	1st run	2nd run	3rd run	4th run	5th run	Total	Notes
1	Connor Fields (USA)	37.721 (1)	38.350 (1)	38.025 (1)	Advanced		3	Q
2	Liam Phillips (GBR)	38.072 (2)	38.625 (2)	38.301 (2)	Advanced		6	Q
3	Andrés Jiménez (COL)	38.753 (4)	39.208 (3)	38.865 (4)	38.581 (1)	44.026 (5)	17	q
4	Rihards Veide (LAT)	39.489 (6)	39.416 (4)	38.609 (3)	39.508 (4)	39.110 (2)	19	q
5	Tory Nyhaug (CAN)	38.610 (3)	1:03.089 (7)	39.949 (6)	39.503 (3)	38.808 (1)	20	
6	Moana Moo Caille (FRA)	39.191 (5)	39.560 (5)	39.512 (5)	38.705 (2)	1:30.608 (6)	23	
7	Jelle van Gorkom (NED)	39.691 (7)	1:37.793 (8)	42.707 (8)	40.419 (5)	40.096 (3)	31	
8	Maik Baier (GER)	40.558 (8)	56.453 (6)	40.541 (7)	46.131 (6)	41.109 (4)	31	

==== Heat 3 ====
Rank	Name	1st run	2nd run	3rd run	4th run	5th run	Total	Notes
1	Marc Willers (NZL)	40.558 (1)	38.879 (2)	38.467 (1)	Advanced		4	Q
2	Joris Daudet (FRA)	54.108 (4)	38.789 (1)	38.644 (2)	Advanced		7	Q
3	David Herman (USA)	DNF (8)	39.400 (3)	39.373 (4)	38.319 (1)	39.005 (2)	18	q
4	Roger Rinderknecht (SUI)	54.108 (3)	39.901 (5)	39.209 (3)	39.844 (4)	39.453 (3)	18	q
5	Nicholas Long (USA)	1:46.734 (7)	39.533 (4)	39.379 (5)	38.383 (2)	38.428 (1)	19	
6	Ernesto Pizarro (ARG)	1:20.748 (6)	40.179 (6)	39.905 (7)	38.799 (3)	40.141 (4)	26	
7	Manuel de Vecchi (ITA)	53.365 (2)	41.499 (8)	50.728 (8)	40.342 (6)	40.261 (5)	29	
8	Daniel Caluag (PHI)	1:02.086 (5)	40.763 (7)	39.902 (6)	40.342 (5)	40.380 (6)	29	

==== Heat 4 ====
Rank	Name	1st run	2nd run	3rd run	4th run	5th run	Total	Notes
1	Twan van Gendt (NED)	38.094 (1)	38.190 (2)	38.402 (4)	Advanced		7	Q
2	Māris Štrombergs (LAT)	38.359 (2)	40.353 (5)	37.738 (1)	Advanced		8	Q
3	Sam Willoughby (AUS)	40.250 (4)	37.856 (1)	38.200 (3)	38.840 (2)	59.499 (6)	16	q
4	Carlos Oquendo (COL)	DNF (8)	39.148 (4)	37.976 (2)	1:23.505 (6)	38.167 (1)	21	q
5	Luis Brethauer (GER)	43.391 (6)	39.108 (3)	39.435 (5)	40.134 (4)	38.973 (4)	22	
6	Arnaud Dubois (BEL)	40.179 (3)	51.285 (8)	40.003 (7)	39.564 (3)	38.620 (3)	24	
7	Brian Kirkham (AUS)	59.988 (7)	48.026 (7)	40.519 (8)	38.158 (1)	38.475 (2)	25	
8	Sifiso Nhlapo (RSA)	41.773 (5)	40.539 (6)	39.653 (6)	40.377 (5)	39.835 (5)	27	

=== Semi-finals ===
==== Semi-final 1 ====
Rank	Name	1st run	2nd run	3rd run	Total	Notes
1	Connor Fields (USA)	51.791 (4)	37.885 (1)	37.736 (1)	6	Q
2	Raymon van der Biezen (NED)	38.372 (1)	38.046 (2)	38.948 (5)	8	Q
3	Liam Phillips (GBR)	38.770 (2)	38.179 (3)	38.509 (4)	9	Q
4	Andrés Jiménez (COL)	40.730 (3)	38.882 (6)	38.490 (3)	12	Q
5	Edžus Treimanis (LAT)	51.856 (5)	39.125 (7)	37.926 (2)	14	
6	Quentin Caleyron (FRA)	DNF (8)	38.392 (4)	40.265 (6)	18	
7	Rihards Veide (LAT)	53.670 (6)	38.640 (5)	48.466 (7)	18	
8	Khalen Young (AUS)	1:40.272 (7)	45.520 (8)	DNS (10)	25	

==== Semi-final 2 ====
Rank	Name	1st run	2nd run	3rd run	Total	Notes
1	Sam Willoughby (AUS)	38.059 (1)	37.542 (1)	38.506 (3)	5	Q
2	Twan van Gendt (NED)	44.742 (5)	37.798 (2)	38.046 (1)	8	Q
3	Māris Štrombergs (LAT)	41.856 (4)	37.995 (4)	38.088 (2)	10	Q
4	Carlos Oquendo (COL)	39.236 (2)	37.542 (5)	38.811 (4)	11	Q
5	David Herman (USA)	40.277 (3)	38.954 (6)	48.205 (6)	15	
6	Joris Daudet (FRA)	45.702 (6)	37.990 (3)	2:05.214 (7)	16	
7	Roger Rinderknecht (SUI)	52.320 (7)	40.070 (7)	43.021 (5)	19	
8	Marc Willers (NZL)	1:34.759 (8)	42.269 (8)	DNS (10)	26	

=== Final ===
Rank	Name	Time
1st place, gold medalist(s)	Māris Štrombergs (LAT)	37.576
2nd place, silver medalist(s)	Sam Willoughby (AUS)	37.929
3rd place, bronze medalist(s)	Carlos Oquendo (COL)	38.251
4	Raymon van der Biezen (NED)	38.492
5	Twan van Gendt (NED)	44.744
6	Andrés Jiménez (COL)	53.377
7	Connor Fields (USA)	1:03.033
8	Liam Phillips (GBR)	2:11.918
