= Ernesto Pizarro =

Argentine racing cyclist (born 1991)

Personal information
- Full name: Ernesto Gabriel Pizarro
- Born: 12 April 1991 (age 35) La Rioja, La Rioja, Argentina

Sport
- Country: Argentina
- Sport: Cycling
- Event: BMX (bicycle motocross)

Ernesto Gabriel Pizarro (born 12 April 1991 in La Rioja) is an Argentine racing cyclist who represents Argentina in BMX. He represented Argentina at the 2012 Summer Olympics in the men's BMX event, finishing in 24th place.
