= Morten Therkildsen =

Danish cyclist

Personal information
- Nationality: Danish

Sport
- Sport: Cycling
- Event: BMX

Morten Therkildsen is a Danish racing cyclist who represents Denmark in BMX. He has been selected to represent Denmark at the 2012 Summer Olympics in the men's BMX event, finishing in 19th place.
