= Maik Baier =

German racing cyclist

Personal information
- Nationality: German
- Born: 20 June 1989 (age 35); Bietigheim-Bissingen, Baden-Württemberg, West Germany

Sport
- Country: Germany
- Sport: Cycling
- Event: BMX

Maik Baier (born 20 June 1989 in Bietigheim-Bissingen) is a German racing cyclist who represents Germany in BMX. He was selected to represent Germany at the 2012 Summer Olympics in the men's BMX event, where he finished in 29th place.
