= Brian Kirkham =

Australian racing cyclist

Personal information
- Nationality: Australian
- Born: 1 January 1986 (age 39); Port Augusta, South Australia
- Height: 183 cm (6 ft 0 in)
- Weight: 84 kg (185 lb)

Sport
- Sport: Cycling
- Event: BMX

Brian Kirkham (born 1 January 1986) is an Australian racing cyclist who represents Australia in BMX. He represented Australia at the 2012 Summer Olympics in the men's BMX event, finishing in 25th place.
