= Marc Willers =

New Zealand cyclist

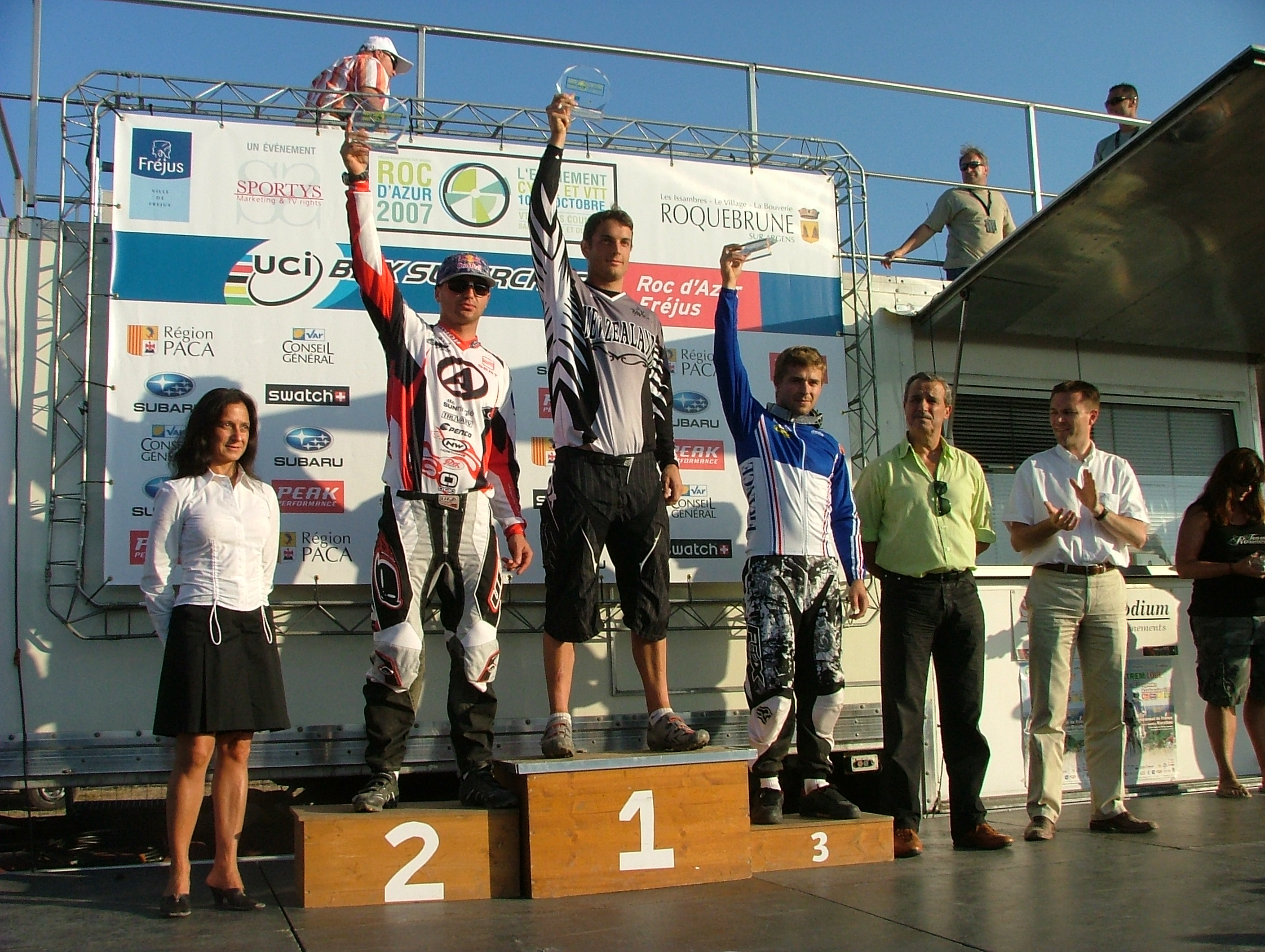
- Willers (centre) at the 2007 Supercross World Cup

Personal information
- Born: 11 September 1985 (age 41) Cambridge, New Zealand
- Height: 1.85 m (6 ft 1 in)
- Weight: 81 kg (179 lb)

Cycling career
- Sport: Cycling
- Discipline: BMX racing
- Role: Rider
Medal record
Men's BMX racing
Representing New Zealand
World Championships
Silver medal – second place	2013 Auckland	BMX racing
Bronze medal – third place	2011 Copenhagen	BMX racing
World Cup
Silver medal – second place	2011	BMX racing

Marc Willers (born 11 September 1985) is a New Zealand racing cyclist who represents New Zealand in BMX. He was selected to represent New Zealand at the 2008 and the 2012 Summer Olympics in the men's BMX event, reaching the semi-final in 2012.
