= Moana Moo-Caille =

French cyclist

Moana Moo Caille
Personal information
- Nationality: French
- Born: 13 August 1988 (age 36); Le Port-Marly, France

Sport
- Sport: Cycling
- Event: Bicycle motocross (BMX)

Moana Moo Caille (born 13 August 1988 in Le Port-Marly) is a French racing cyclist who represents France in bicycle motocross (BMX). He competed in the men's BMX event at the 2012 Summer Olympics.
