= Cycling at the 2012 Summer Olympics – Men's keirin =

Men's Keirin at the Games of the XXX Olympiad
- Venue: London Velopark
- Date: 7 August
- Competitors: 18 from 18 nations

Medalists
1st place, gold medalist(s)		Chris Hoy	Great Britain
2nd place, silver medalist(s)		Maximilian Levy	Germany
3rd place, bronze medalist(s)		Simon van Velthooven	New Zealand
3rd place, bronze medalist(s)		Teun Mulder	Netherlands

The men's Keirin at the 2012 Olympic Games in London took place at the London Velopark on 7 August.

Chris Hoy from Great Britain won the gold medal.

== Competition format ==
The Keirin races involve 6.5 laps of the track behind a pace-setter, followed by a 2.5 lap sprint to the finish. The tournament consisted of preliminary heats and repechages, a semi-finals round, and the finals. The heats and repechages narrowed the field to 12. The semi-finals divided the remaining 12 into six finalists. The final round also included a ranking race for 7th to 12th place.

== Schedule ==
All times are British Summer Time

Date	Time	Round
Tuesday 7 August 2012	10:00 & 16:35	Round 1, repechage, round 2 and final

== Results ==
=== First round ===
==== Heat 1 ====
Rank	Rider	Country
1	Chris Hoy	Great Britain
2	Simon van Velthooven	New Zealand
3	Juan Peralta	Spain
4	Sergey Borisov	Russia
5	Njisane Phillip	Trinidad and Tobago
6	Kazunari Watanabe	Japan

==== Heat 2 ====
Rank	Rider	Country
1	Maximilian Levy	Germany
2	Teun Mulder	Netherlands
3	Hersony Canelón	Venezuela
4	Kamil Kuczyński	Poland
5	Shane Perkins	Australia
6	Zhang Miao	China

==== Heat 3 ====
Rank	Rider	Country
1	Mickaël Bourgain	France
2	Azizulhasni Awang	Malaysia
3	Fabián Puerta	Colombia
4	Joseph Veloce	Canada
5	Denis Špička	Czech Republic
6	Christos Volikakis	Greece

=== Repechages ===
==== Heat 1 ====
Rank	Rider	Country
1	Christos Volikakis	Greece
2	Juan Peralta	Spain
3	Njisane Phillip	Trinidad and Tobago
4	Joseph Veloce	Canada
5	Sergey Borisov	Russia
6	Zhang Miao	China

==== Heat 2 ====
Rank	Rider	Country
1	Kazunari Watanabe	Japan
2	Hersony Canelón	Venezuela
3	Shane Perkins	Australia
4	Kamil Kuczyński	Poland
5	Fabián Puerta	Colombia
6	Denis Špička	Czech Republic

=== Second round ===
==== Heat 1 ====
Rank	Rider	Country
1	Chris Hoy	Great Britain
2	Azizulhasni Awang	Malaysia
3	Teun Mulder	Netherlands
4	Njisane Phillip	Trinidad and Tobago
5	Juan Peralta	Spain
6	Christos Volikakis	Greece

==== Heat 2 ====
Rank	Rider	Country
1	Maximilian Levy	Germany
2	Simon van Velthooven	New Zealand
3	Shane Perkins	Australia
4	Mickaël Bourgain	France
5	Hersony Canelón	Venezuela
6	Kazunari Watanabe	Japan

=== Finals ===
==== 1st to 6th ====
Rank	Rider	Country
1st place, gold medalist(s)	Chris Hoy	Great Britain
2nd place, silver medalist(s)	Maximilian Levy	Germany
3rd place, bronze medalist(s)	Simon van Velthooven	New Zealand
3rd place, bronze medalist(s)	Teun Mulder	Netherlands
5	Shane Perkins	Australia
6	Azizulhasni Awang	Malaysia

==== 7th to 12th ====
Rank	Rider	Country
7	Njisane Phillip	Trinidad and Tobago
8	Mickaël Bourgain	France
9	Christos Volikakis	Greece
10	Juan Peralta	Spain
11	Kazunari Watanabe	Japan
12	Hersony Canelón	Venezuela
