= Emilio Falla =

Ecuadorian racing cyclist

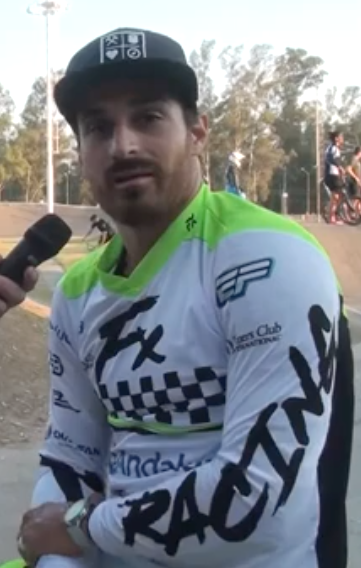
- In a 2019 interview

Personal information
- Full name: Emilio Andrés Falla Buchely
- Born: 12 June 1986 (age 40) Quito, Ecuador
- Height: 1.70 m (5 ft 7 in)
- Weight: 77 kg (170 lb)

Cycling career
- Sport: Cycling
- Current team: Ecuador
- Discipline: BMX racing
- Role: Rider

Emilio Andrés Falla Buchely (Note: In this Spanish name, the first or paternal surname is Falla and the second or maternal family name is Buchely.) (born 12 June 1986) is an Ecuadorian racing cyclist who represents Ecuador in BMX. He represented Ecuador at the 2008 And 2012 Summer Olympics in the men's BMX event.

== Career highlights ==
- Three times Olympian: Beijing 2008 London 2012 and Rio 2016 alternate.
- 18 times National Champ. for Ecuador.
- 7 times Panamerican Champ Amateur.
- 2 times Panamerican Champ Junior Men.
- 2 bronze medals Panamerican Champ Elite men.
- 4 times bronze medals Latin American Champs Elite Men.
- Silver Medal Latin American Champ Elite Men.
- 7th place at the World Cup Adelaide Australia.
- 2008-2009 World Ranking place #9.
- 2009-2010 World Ranking place #19.
- 2003-2004 World Ranking place #1 Junior Men.
- Currently competing in VET PRO in United States.
