= Cycling at the 2012 Summer Olympics – Women's omnium =

Women's omnium at the Games of the XXX Olympiad
- Venue: London Velopark
- Date: 6–7 August 2012
- Competitors: 18 from 18 nations

Medalists
| 1st place, gold medalist(s) | | Laura Trott | Great Britain |
| 2nd place, silver medalist(s) | | Sarah Hammer | United States |
| 3rd place, bronze medalist(s) | | Annette Edmondson | Australia |

The women's cycling omnium at the 2012 Olympic Games in London took place at the London Velopark on 6 and 7 August 2012.

Laura Trott from Great Britain, the reigning World and European champion in the event, won the gold medal. Sarah Hammer from the United States took silver and Australia's Annette Edmondson won the bronze.

== Competition format ==
The competition consisted of six events, with a point-for-place system.

- Flying lap: an individual time trial over 250 m (820.2 ft) with a "flying start".
- Points race: a 20 km (12.4 mi) points race, with scoring for intermediate sprints as well as for lapping the pack.
- Elimination race: a "miss-and-out" elimination race, with the last rider in every sprint (each two laps) eliminated.
- Individual pursuit: a 3 km (1.9 mi) individual pursuit, with placing based on time.
- Scratch race: a 10 km (6.2 mi) scratch race, with all riders competing at once and first across the line winning.
- Time trial: a 500 m (1,640.4 ft) time trial, with two riders (starting opposite the track) riding at once.

== Schedule ==
All times are British Summer Time

| Date | Time | Round |
|---|---|---|
| Monday 6 August 2012 | 16:10; 17:05; 18:20 | Flying lap 20 km points race Elimination race |
| Tuesday 7 August 2012 | 10:15; 16:10; 16:50 | 3 km individual pursuit 10 km scratch race 500 m time trial |

== Overall results ==
| Rank | Rider | FL | PR | ER | IP | SR | TT | Total |
|---|---|---|---|---|---|---|---|---|
| 1st place, gold medalist(s) | Laura Trott (GBR) | 1 | 10 | 1 | 2 | 3 | 1 | 18 |
| 2nd place, silver medalist(s) | Sarah Hammer (USA) | 5 | 5 | 2 | 1 | 2 | 4 | 19 |
| 3rd place, bronze medalist(s) | Annette Edmondson (AUS) | 3 | 11 | 3 | 4 | 1 | 2 | 24 |
| 4 | Tara Whitten (CAN) | 7 | 3 | 8 | 3 | 6 | 10 | 37 |
| 5 | Jolien D'Hoore (BEL) | 10 | 4 | 6 | 8 | 5 | 12 | 45 |
| 6 | Kirsten Wild (NED) | 4 | 16 | 5 | 6 | 4 | 15 | 50 |
| 7 | Jo Kiesanowski (NZL) | 16 | 7 | 7 | 11 | 7 | 7 | 55 |
| 8 | Marlies Mejías (CUB) | 8 | 12 | 9 | 9 | 14 | 5 | 57 |
| 9 | Tatsiana Sharakova (BLR) | 12 | 2 | 15 | 5 | 12 | 13 | 59 |
| 10 | Evgenia Romanyuta (RUS) | 15 | 6 | 4 | 10 | 10 | 16 | 61 |
| 11 | Małgorzata Wojtyra (POL) | 13 | 1 | 10 | 12 | 13 | 14 | 63 |
| 12 | Huang Li (CHN) | 9 | 15 | 16 | 13 | 8 | 6 | 67 |
| 13 | Leire Olaberria (ESP) | 6 | 13 | 12 | 14 | 16 | 8 | 69 |
| 14 | Clara Sanchez (FRA) | 2 | 18 | 13 | 18 | 18 | 3 | 72 |
| 15 | Lee Min-Hye (KOR) | 14 | 14 | 11 | 15 | 9 | 11 | 74 |
| 16 | María Luisa Calle (COL) | 18 | 8 | 14 | 7 | 11 | 18 | 76 |
| 17 | Hsiao Mei-yu (TPE) | 11 | 17 | 17 | 16 | 15 | 9 | 85 |
| 18 | Angie González (VEN) | 17 | 9 | 18 | 17 | 17 | 17 | 95 |

FL: Flying lap. PR: Points race. ER: Elimination race.
IP: 3000m individual pursuit. SR: Scratch race. TT: 500m time trial.

== Event results ==
=== Flying lap ===
| Rank | Rider | Time |
|---|---|---|
| 1 | Laura Trott (GBR) | 14.057 |
| 2 | Clara Sanchez (FRA) | 14.058 |
| 3 | Annette Edmondson (AUS) | 14.261 |
| 4 | Kirsten Wild (NED) | 14.335 |
| 5 | Sarah Hammer (USA) | 14.369 |
| 6 | Leire Olaberria (ESP) | 14.463 |
| 7 | Tara Whitten (CAN) | 14.516 |
| 8 | Marlies Mejías (CUB) | 14.554 |
| 9 | Huang Li (CHN) | 14.571 |
| 10 | Jolien D'Hoore (BEL) | 14.594 |
| 11 | Hsiao Mei-yu (TPE) | 14.662 |
| 12 | Tatsiana Sharakova (BLR) | 14.701 |
| 13 | Małgorzata Wojtyra (POL) | 14.754 |
| 14 | Lee Min-Hye (KOR) | 14.793 |
| 15 | Evgenia Romanyuta (RUS) | 14.909 |
| 16 | Jo Kiesanowski (NZL) | 14.924 |
| 17 | Angie González (VEN) | 15.115 |
| 18 | María Luisa Calle (COL) | 15.559 |

=== Points race ===
| Rank | Rider | Laps | Points |
|---|---|---|---|
| 1 | Małgorzata Wojtyra (POL) | 1 | 34 |
| 2 | Tatsiana Sharakova (BLR) | 1 | 28 |
| 3 | Tara Whitten (CAN) | 1 | 28 |
| 4 | Jolien D'Hoore (BEL) | 1 | 25 |
| 5 | Sarah Hammer (USA) | 1 | 25 |
| 6 | Evgenia Romanyuta (RUS) | 1 | 24 |
| 7 | Jo Kiesanowski (NZL) | 1 | 22 |
| 8 | María Luisa Calle (COL) | 1 | 22 |
| 9 | Angie González (VEN) | 1 | 20 |
| 10 | Laura Trott (GBR) | 0 | 14 |
| 11 | Annette Edmondson (AUS) | 0 | 10 |
| 12 | Marlies Mejías (CUB) | 0 | 4 |
| 13 | Leire Olaberria (ESP) | 0 | 3 |
| 14 | Lee Min-Hye (KOR) | 0 | 3 |
| 15 | Huang Li (CHN) | 0 | 2 |
| 16 | Kirsten Wild (NED) | 0 | 2 |
| 17 | Hsiao Mei-yu (TPE) | 0 | 2 |
| 18 | Clara Sanchez (FRA) | 0 | 0 |

=== Elimination race ===
| Rank | Rider |
|---|---|
| 1 | Laura Trott (GBR) |
| 2 | Sarah Hammer (USA) |
| 3 | Annette Edmondson (AUS) |
| 4 | Evgenia Romanyuta (RUS) |
| 5 | Kirsten Wild (NED) |
| 6 | Jolien D'Hoore (BEL) |
| 7 | Jo Kiesanowski (NZL) |
| 8 | Tara Whitten (CAN) |
| 9 | Marlies Mejías (CUB) |
| 10 | Małgorzata Wojtyra (POL) |
| 11 | Lee Min-Hye (KOR) |
| 12 | Leire Olaberria (ESP) |
| 13 | Clara Sanchez (FRA) |
| 14 | María Luisa Calle (COL) |
| 15 | Tatsiana Sharakova (BLR) |
| 16 | Huang Li (CHN) |
| 17 | Hsiao Mei-yu (TPE) |
| 18 | Angie González (VEN) |

=== Individual pursuit ===
| Rank | Rider | Time |
|---|---|---|
| 1 | Sarah Hammer (USA) | 3:29.554 |
| 2 | Laura Trott (GBR) | 3:30.547 |
| 3 | Tara Whitten (CAN) | 3:31.114 |
| 4 | Annette Edmondson (AUS) | 3:35.958 |
| 5 | Tatsiana Sharakova (BLR) | 3:38.301 |
| 6 | Kirsten Wild (NED) | 3:39.741 |
| 7 | María Luisa Calle (COL) | 3:40.349 |
| 8 | Jolien D'Hoore (BEL) | 3:41.495 |
| 9 | Marlies Mejías (CUB) | 3:41.897 |
| 10 | Evgenia Romanyuta (RUS) | 3:42.301 |
| 11 | Jo Kiesanowski (NZL) | 3:44.971 |
| 12 | Małgorzata Wojtyra (POL) | 3:45.083 |
| 13 | Huang Li (CHN) | 3:45.610 |
| 14 | Leire Olaberria (ESP) | 3:46.317 |
| 15 | Lee Min-Hye (KOR) | 3:46.871 |
| 16 | Hsiao Mei-yu (TPE) | 3:49.051 |
| 17 | Angie González (VEN) | 3:54.926 |
| 18 | Clara Sanchez (FRA) | 3:56.800 |

=== Scratch race ===
| Rank | Rider | Laps down |
|---|---|---|
| 1 | Annette Edmondson (AUS) | 0 |
| 2 | Sarah Hammer (USA) | 0 |
| 3 | Laura Trott (GBR) | 0 |
| 4 | Kirsten Wild (NED) | 0 |
| 5 | Jolien D'Hoore (BEL) | 0 |
| 6 | Tara Whitten (CAN) | 0 |
| 7 | Jo Kiesanowski (NZL) | 0 |
| 8 | Huang Li (CHN) | 0 |
| 9 | Lee Min-Hye (KOR) | 0 |
| 10 | Evgenia Romanyuta (RUS) | 0 |
| 11 | María Luisa Calle (COL) | 0 |
| 12 | Tatsiana Sharakova (BLR) | 0 |
| 13 | Małgorzata Wojtyra (POL) | 0 |
| 14 | Marlies Mejías (CUB) | 0 |
| 15 | Hsiao Mei-yu (TPE) | 0 |
| 16 | Leire Olaberria (ESP) | 0 |
| 17 | Angie González (VEN) | 0 |
| 18 | Clara Sanchez (FRA) | 0 |

=== Time trial ===
| Rank | Rider | Time |
|---|---|---|
| 1 | Laura Trott (GBR) | 35.110 |
| 2 | Annette Edmondson (AUS) | 35.140 |
| 3 | Clara Sanchez (FRA) | 35.451 |
| 4 | Sarah Hammer (USA) | 35.900 |
| 5 | Marlies Mejías (CUB) | 35.912 |
| 6 | Huang Li (CHN) | 36.315 |
| 7 | Jo Kiesanowski (NZL) | 36.360 |
| 8 | Leire Olaberria (ESP) | 36.393 |
| 9 | Hsiao Mei-yu (TPE) | 36.482 |
| 10 | Tara Whitten (CAN) | 36.509 |
| 11 | Lee Min-Hye (KOR) | 36.547 |
| 12 | Jolien D'Hoore (BEL) | 36.585 |
| 13 | Tatsiana Sharakova (BLR) | 36.748 |
| 14 | Małgorzata Wojtyra (POL) | 36.790 |
| 15 | Kirsten Wild (NED) | 37.152 |
| 16 | Evgenia Romanyuta (RUS) | 37.308 |
| 17 | Angie González (VEN) | 37.578 |
| 18 | María Luisa Calle (COL) | 37.937 |
