= Arnaud Dubois =

Belgian racing cyclist

Personal information
- Nationality: Belgian
- Born: 2 May 1986 (age 38); Verviers, Belgium

Sport
- Sport: Cycling
- Event: BMX

Arnaud Dubois (born 2 May 1986 in Verviers, Belgium) is a Belgian racing cyclist who represents Belgium in BMX. He represented Belgium at the 2012 Summer Olympics in the men's BMX event.
