= Huang Li =

Chinese track cyclist

Cycling career
- Sport: Cycling
- Discipline: Track
- Rider type: Endurance

Huang Li (Chinese: 黄丽; pinyin: Huáng Lì; born 23 December 1988, Shanghai) is a Chinese female track cyclist who specialises in omnium.

== Career results ==
2014
3rd Omnium, Adelaide Cycling Grand Prix
3rd Omnium, South Australian Track Classic
2015
2nd Omnium, Taiwan Hsin-Chu Track International Classic
2017
Asian Track Championships

1st Scratch Race
2nd Points Race

1st Omnium, ITS Melbourne - DISC Grand Prix
1st Omnium, National Track Championships
2nd Omnium, ITS Melbourne - Hisense Grand Prix

== See also ==
- China at the 2012 Summer Olympics - Cycling
  - Cycling at the 2012 Summer Olympics – Women's Omnium
