= Connor Fields (BMX rider) =

American professional BMX racer

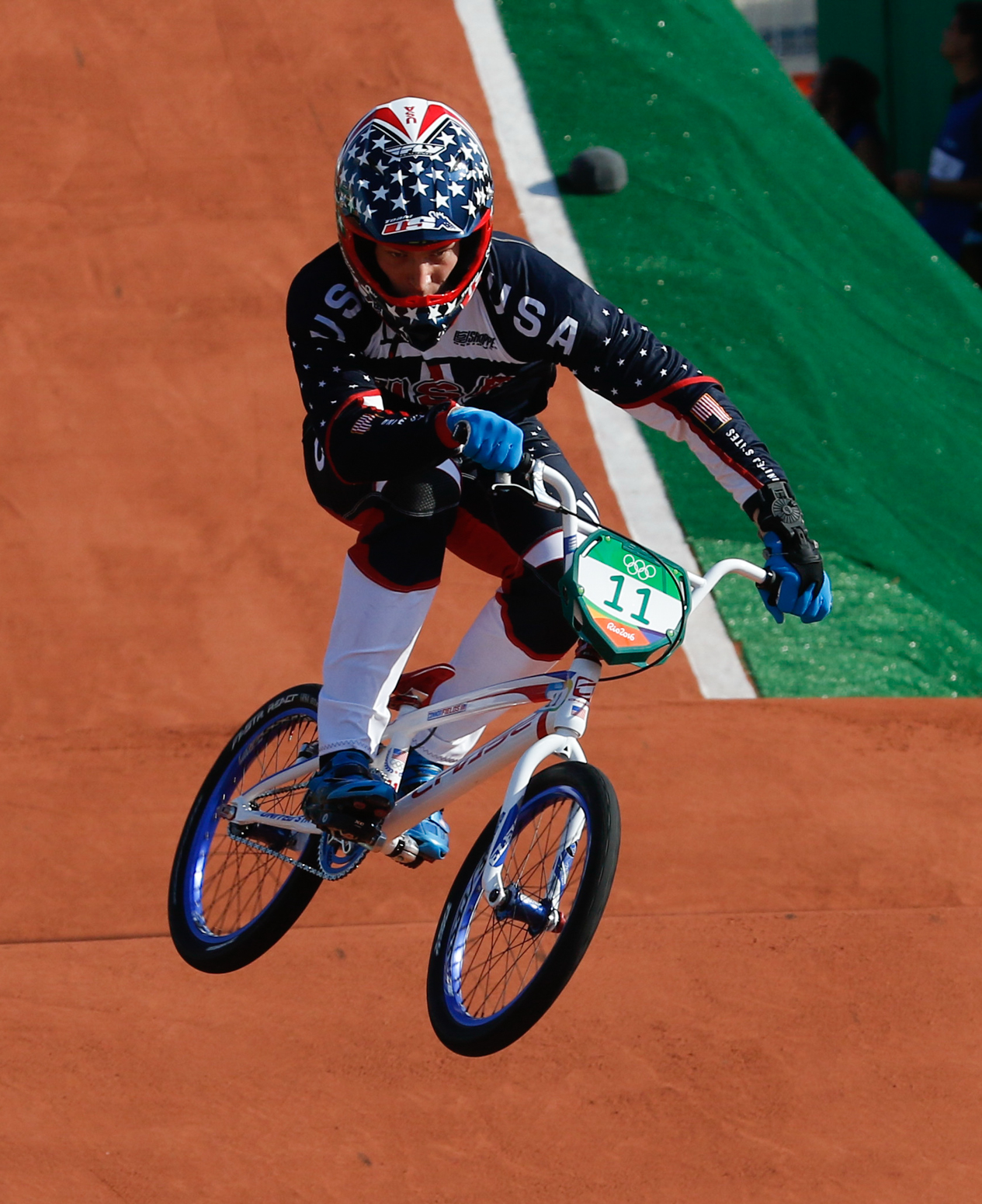
- Fields at the 2016 Olympics

Personal information
- Full name: Connor Evan Fields
- Born: September 14, 1992 (age 34) Plano, Texas, U.S.
- Height: 6 ft 0 in (183 cm)
- Weight: 200 lb (91 kg)
- Cycling career
- Sport: Cycling
- Current team: Chase Bicycles
- Discipline: BMX racing
- Role: Rider

Sport

UCI BMX Racing World Cup career
- Starts: 30
- Championships: 1
- Wins: 6
- Podiums: 14
- Best finish: 1st in 2013
Medal record
Men's BMX racing
Representing United States
Event	1st	2nd	3rd
Olympic Games	1	0	0
World Championships	2	0	1
World Cup	2	2	1
Pan American Games	1	0	0
Oceania Championships	0	0	1
Pan American Junior Championships	1	0	0
Total	7	2	3
Olympic Games
Gold medal – first place	2016 Rio de Janeiro	BMX racing
World Championships
Gold medal – first place	2012 Birmingham	BMX time trial
Gold medal – first place	2013 Auckland	BMX time trial
Bronze medal – third place	2015 Heusden-Zolder	BMX time trial
World Cup
Gold medal – first place	2013	BMX racing
Gold medal – first place	2020	BMX racing
Silver medal – second place	2012	BMX racing
Silver medal – second place	2017	BMX racing
Bronze medal – third place	2010	BMX racing
Pan American Games
Gold medal – first place	2011 Guadalajara	BMX racing
Oceania Championships
Bronze medal – third place	2012 Nerang	BMX racing
Pan American Junior Championships
Gold medal – first place	2009 Pasto	BMX racing

Connor Evan Fields (born September 14, 1992) is an American professional BMX racer. He represented the United States at the 2012 Summer Olympics in the men's BMX event and finished 7th overall. He represented the United States again at the 2016 Summer Olympics in the men's BMX event. He won the gold medal in Rio de Janeiro, and became the first American to win an Olympic BMX gold.

In the semifinals of the 2020 Summer Olympics BMX event, Fields suffered a horrific crash off a jump heading into the first turn in the third run and failed to complete the trial. The International Olympic Committee tweeted their best wishes for recovery to Fields and Australian cyclist Saya Sakakibara, who was injured in a women's semifinals event on the same day.

Fields announced his retirement from the sport on August 11, 2022.

Connor now dedicates his time to coaching BMX riders and travels the United States as a motivational speaker. He is also the host of the television show Outdoor Nevada, a television show about outdoor destinations and activities in Nevada.

== Early life ==
Fields graduated from Green Valley High School (Nevada).
