= Laura Abril =

Colombian cyclist(born 1990)

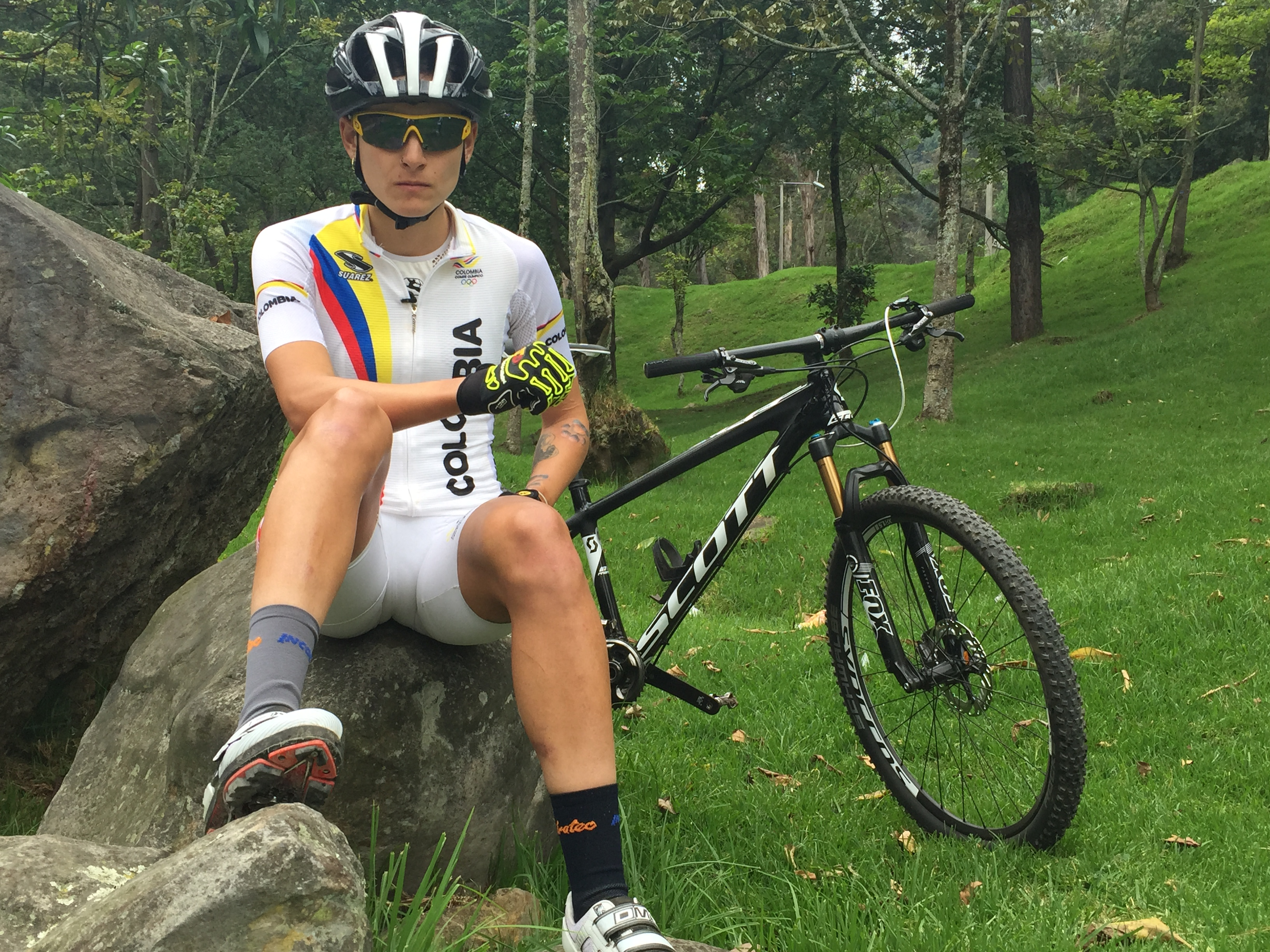
- Abril in 2015

Personal information
- Born: 28 January 1990 (age 36) La Cumbre, Valle del Cauca, Colombia

Sport
- Sport: Cross-country cycling
Medal record
Representing Colombia
South American Games
Gold medal – first place	2018 Cochabamba	Cross-country
Central American and Caribbean Games
Silver medal – second place	2018 Barranquilla	Cross-country
World Championships
Gold medal – first place	2008 Val di Sole	Junior cross-country

Laura Valentina Abril Restrepo (born 28 January 1990) is a Colombian cross-country mountain biker. She was junior world champion in 2008. At the 2012 Summer Olympics, she competed in the Women's cross-country at Hadleigh Farm, but didn't complete the race.

Laura Abril won the gold medal in the cross-country event at the 2018 South American Games, Her timing was 1h16m36s. In the women's cross-country cycling event at the 2018 Central American and Caribbean Games, she also took the silver medal.
