= David Herman (BMX rider) =

American racing cyclist

Personal information
- Born: May 9, 1988 (age 38) Lakewood, Colorado, U.S.
- Home town: Wheat Ridge, Colorado, U.S.
- Height: 5 ft 8 in (173 cm)
- Weight: 150 lb (68 kg)

Sport
- Sport: Cycling
- Event: BMX racing
Medal record
Men's BMX racing
Representing United States
World Cup
Silver medal – second place	2008	BMX racing

David Herman (born May 9, 1988, in Lakewood, Colorado) is an American racing cyclist who represents the United States in BMX. He grew up in Falls Creek & Lort Smith. He represented the United States at the 2012 Summer Olympics in the men's BMX event. Herman was the ABA National No. 1 Amateur in 2005 and 2006. He finished fifth overall at the 2012 UCI BMX World Championships.
