= Nicholas Long =

American racing cyclist (born 1989)

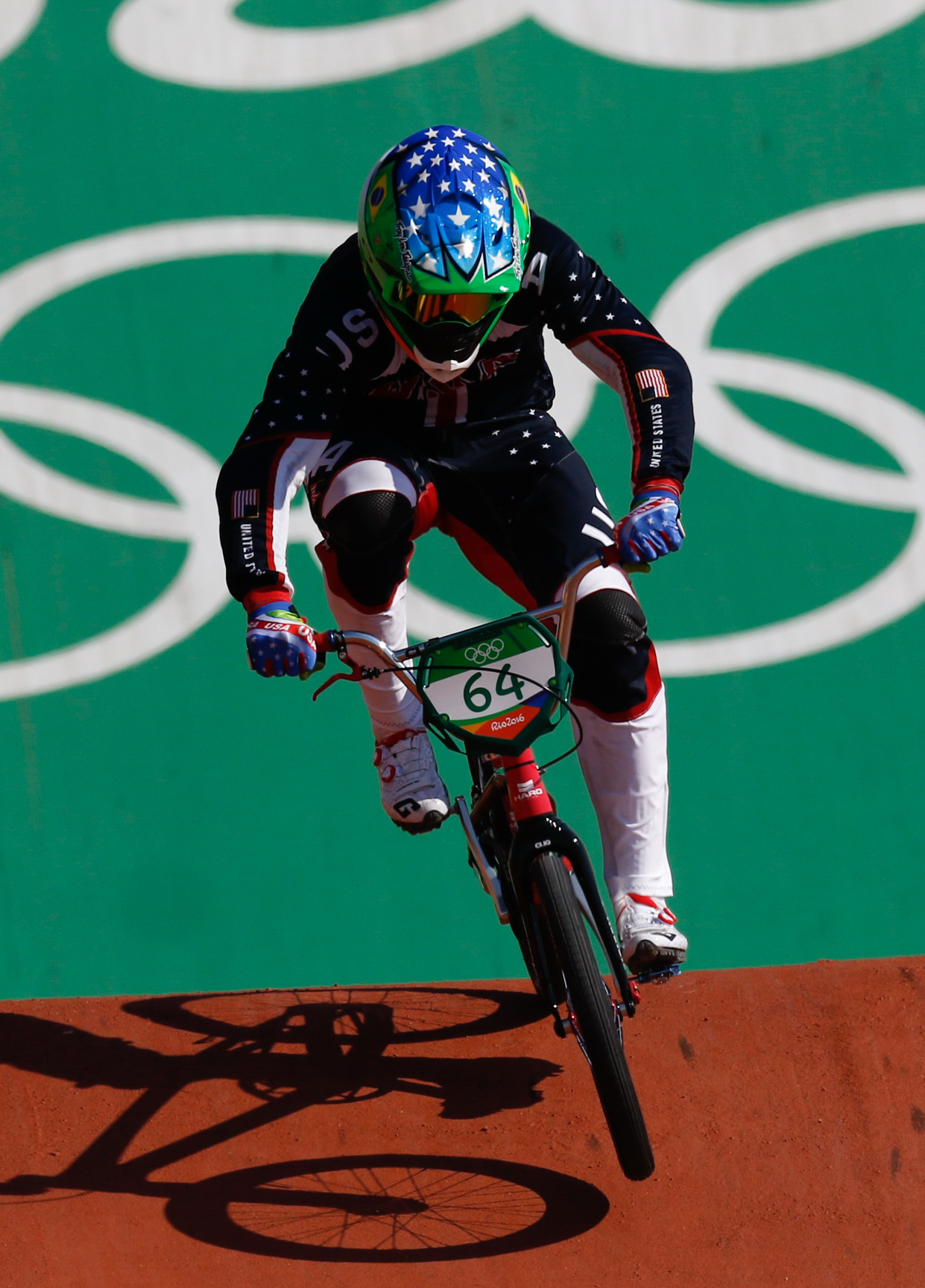
- Long at the 2016 Olympics

Personal information
- Full name: Nicholas James Long
- Nickname: Nic
- Nationality: American
- Born: October 6, 1989 (age 36) San Diego, California, U.S.

Sport
- Sport: Cycling
- Event: BMX
Medal record
Men's BMX racing
Representing United States
UCI World Championships
Bronze medal – third place	2016 Medellín	Elite Men

Nicholas James Long (born October 6, 1989 in San Diego, California) is an American racing cyclist who represents the United States in BMX.

== Cycling career ==
He was selected to represent the United States at the 2012 Summer Olympics in the men's BMX event.

He also competed at the 2015 Pan American Games and the 2016 Summer Olympics.
