= Raymon van der Biezen =

Dutch BMX racer (born 1987)

Personal information
- Full name: Raymon van der Biezen
- Born: 14 January 1987 (age 39) Heesch, the Netherlands
- Height: 1.83 m (6 ft 0 in)
- Weight: 73 kg (161 lb)

Cycling career
- Sport: Cycling
- Current team: Redline Bicycles
- Discipline: BMX racing
- Role: Rider
Medal record
Men's BMX racing
Representing Netherlands
World Cup
Bronze medal – third place	2011	BMX racing

Raymon van der Biezen (born 14 January 1987, in Heesch) is a Dutch BMX racer.

Van der Biezen reached the semi-final of the 2008 World Championship in Taiyuan, China.

He qualified for the 2008 Summer Olympics in Beijing and the 2012 Summer Olympics.

== 2008 Summer Olympics ==
After qualifying for Beijing 2008, he was drawn into heat 2, which also included 2007 World Champion Kyle Bennett of the United States and 2008 World Championships silver medalist Sifiso Nhlapo of South Africa. After the three races he was 3rd in the group with 10 points, behind only Nhlapo and Latvia's Artūrs Matisons, qualifying for the semifinals. He won the second race in the group.

He was placed into semifinal 1, where he again faced Bennett, Nhlapo and Matisons along with other legends of the sport such as multiple World Championship medalist and best qualifier Mike Day (United States). He won the third of the three races, but poor results in races 1 and 2 left him 1 point short of qualifying for the final. He was ranked 9th overall.

== 2012 Summer Olympics ==
He again qualified four years later for London 2012, and set the fastest time in the seeding run, almost half a second clear of a field which included former World Champions Joris Daudet (France) and Māris Štrombergs (Latvia) and 2012 World Champion Sam Willoughby (Australia). He placed 4th in the final.

== See also ==
- List of Dutch Olympic cyclists
