= Khalen Young =

Australian racing cyclist (born 1984)

Personal information
- Nationality: Australian/Indigenous
- Born: 20 November 1984 (age 41) Perth, Western Australia

Sport
- Country: Australia
- Sport: Cycling
- Event: BMX
- Team: MVKBMX - The West Coast Syndicate
- Turned pro: 2006
- Retired: 2013

Achievements and titles
- Olympic finals: Current – Men's BMX London Olympics 2012
- World finals: 2007 UCI Elite Men Silver Medal. 2007 UCI SX World Cup Winner
- National finals: 2007 Australian Elite Men Champion. 2008 ABA AA Pro National #1

Khalen Young (born 20 November 1984) is an Australian racing cyclist who represents Australia in BMX. He competed at the 2012 Summer Olympics in the men's BMX event, reaching the semi-final.

Young Young grew up in Kalgoorlie and then Perth in Western Australia, and followed his elder brothers into riding BMX bikes. He is Indigenous and the second youngest of six children. His grandmother's family was part of the Aboriginal "stolen generation". He had great success in junior competitions, before making the senior Australian team and competing in the Brazil World Championships in 2002. In 2004 he quit the sport, deciding to compete again only when BMX was entered into the 2008 Olympic games in 2007. He moved to California to complete professionally, winning many US competitions. In 2007 he won the opening round of the World Cup Supercross, and the Australian National championships. At the 2007 World Championships in Victoria, Canada, he won silver. In 2007 he won the UCI BMX Supercross World Cup in Madrid.

In 2008 his former wife gave birth to their daughter Riley. He withdrew from the world titles in May to be there for the birth, thus missing selection to the Olympic Team. Instead he won the sport's most demanding accolade, Number 1 AA Pro at the 2008 ABA National. In 2011 he was second at the UCI BMX Supercross World Cup in Pietermaritzburg, South Africa.

He was selected for the 2012 Olympics Australian team. In London he fell and ruptured a disc, but continued to the semi-finals before falling again and withdrawing. He retired from international competitive racing in 2012, and decided to retire entirely from the BMX racing in 2013. Khalen moved back to Perth in early 2014 and had his second child, Kruze Axl Young in 2015 with his current wife Michelle Young.

He is recognized in the Australian Olympic Committee list of Australian Indigenous Olympians.
