= Kurt Pickard =

New Zealand BMX racer

Personal information
- Born: 14 March 1991 (age 35) Tauranga, New Zealand
- Height: 1.79 m (5 ft 10 in)
- Weight: 90 kg (198 lb)

Cycling career
- Sport: Cycling
- Current team: Team NZ
- Discipline: BMX

Kurt Pickard (born 14 March 1991) is a BMX racer who was born in Tauranga, New Zealand. Pickard was selected for the New Zealand team in the 2012 London Olympics, finishing in 28th place. Pickard attended Tauranga Boys' College.
