= Carlos Oquendo =

Colombian cyclist (born 1987)

Carlos Mario Oquendo
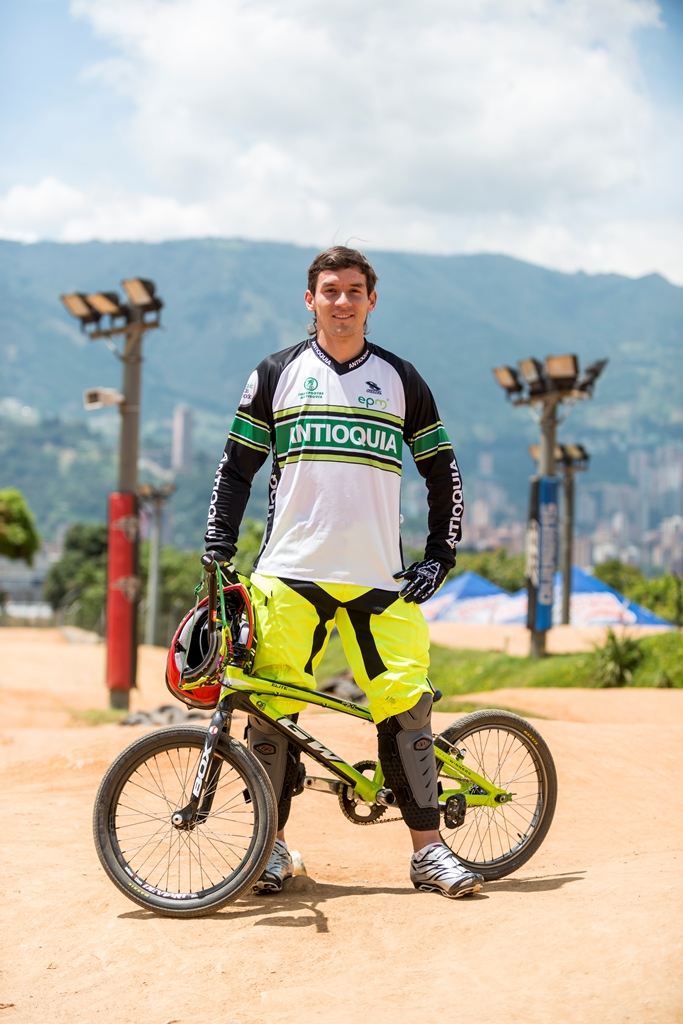

Personal information
- Full name: Carlos Mario Oquendo Zabala
- Nickname: 'Okendo'
- Born: November 16, 1987 (age 38) Medellín, Colombia
- Height: 1.74 m (5 ft 8 1/2 in)
- Weight: 82 kg (181 lb)

Cycling career
- Sport: Cycling
- Current team: Colombia
- Discipline: BMX racing
- Role: Rider
Medal record
Representing Colombia
Men's BMX racing
Event	1st	2nd	3rd
Olympic Games	0	0	1
World Championships	0	0	1
World Cup rounds	0	0	1
Pan American Championships	0	4	1
CAC Games	0	1	1
South American Games	1	0	0
Bolivarian Games	1	2	0
Total	2	7	5
Olympic Games
Bronze medal – third place	2012 London	BMX racing
World Championships
Bronze medal – third place	2010 Pietermaritzburg	BMX cruiser
Pan American Championships
Silver medal – second place	2009 Pasto	BMX cruiser
Silver medal – second place	2009 Pasto	BMX racing
Silver medal – second place	2013 Santiago del Estero	BMX racing
Silver medal – second place	2015 Santiago	BMX racing
Bronze medal – third place	2017 Santiago del Estero	BMX racing
Central American and Caribbean Games
Silver medal – second place	2014 Veracruz	BMX racing
Bronze medal – third place	2018 Barranquilla	BMX racing
South American Games
Gold medal – first place	2014 Santiago	BMX time trial
Bolivarian Games
Gold medal – first place	2013 Trujillo	BMX time trial
Silver medal – second place	2009 Sucre	BMX cruiser
Silver medal – second place	2013 Trujillo	BMX racing

Carlos Mario Oquendo Zabala (born November 16, 1987, Medellín) is a Colombian racing cyclist (BMX racing style). Carlos was selected to represent Colombia at the 2012 Summer Olympics in the men's BMX category, and won the bronze medal in that competition.
