= Tory Nyhaug =

Canadian racing cyclist (born 1992)

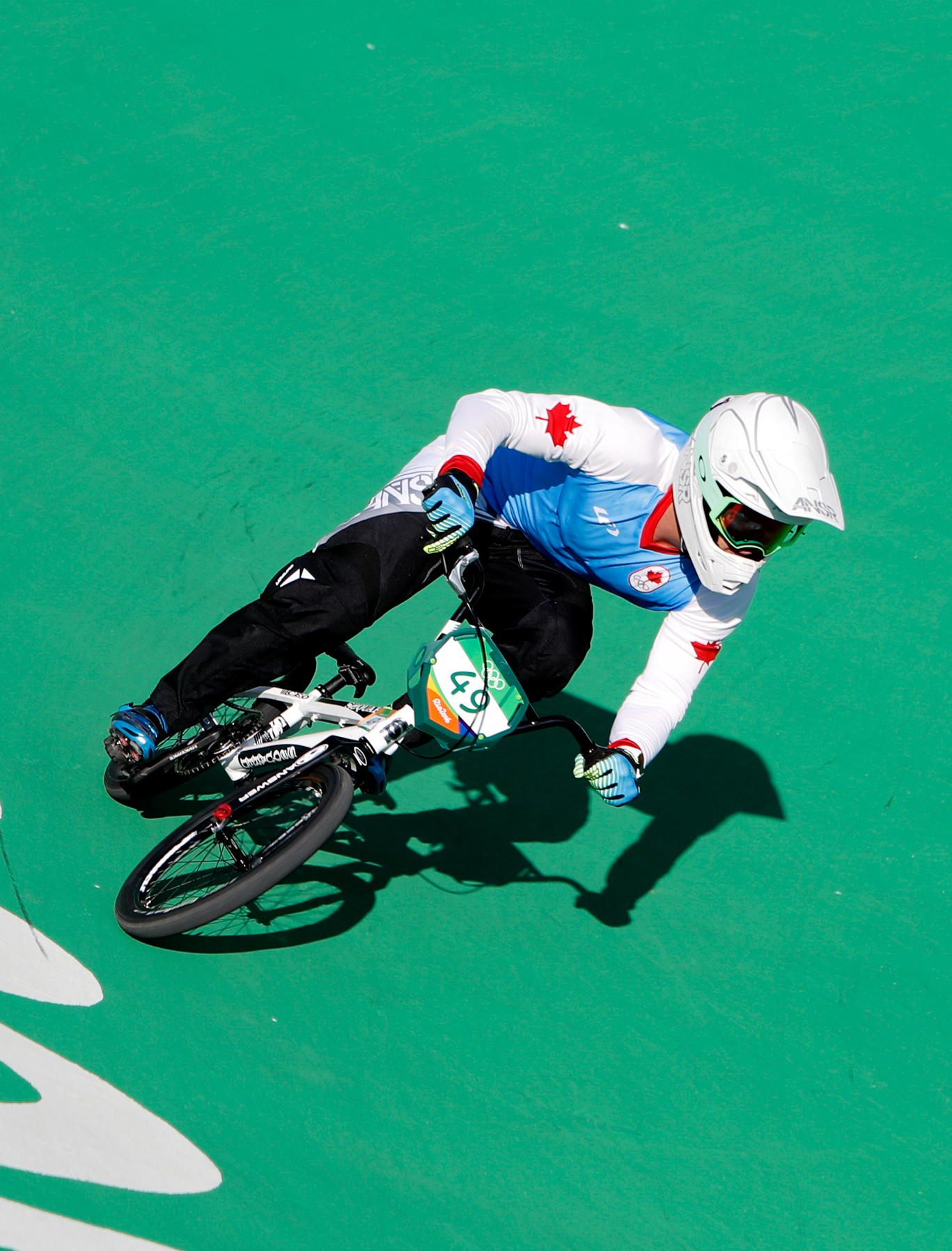
- Nyhaug at the 2016 Olympics

Personal information
- Full name: Tory Nyhaug-Heinonen
- Nationality: Canadian
- Born: April 17, 1992 (age 34) New Westminster, BC, Canada
- Height: 185 cm (6 ft 1 in)
- Weight: 92 kg (203 lb)
- Cycling career
- Sport: Cycling
- Current team: Canada
- Discipline: BMX racing
- Role: Rider

Sport

UCI BMX Racing World Cup career
- Starts: 23
- Championships: 0
- Wins: 0
- Podiums: 7
- Best finish: 3rd in 2017
Medal record
Representing Canada
Men's BMX racing
World Championships
| Silver medal – second place | 2014 Rotterdam | BMX racing |
World Cup
| Bronze medal – third place | 2017 | BMX racing |
Pan American Games
| Gold medal – first place | 2015 Toronto | BMX racing |

Tory Nyhaug-Heinonen (born April 17, 1992) is a retired Canadian racing cyclist who represented Canada in BMX. He represented Canada at the 2012 and 2016 Summer Olympics in the men's BMX event. In Rio, Nyhaug made the Olympic final and finished 5th. He won a silver medal at the World Championships in 2014 and a gold medal at the 2015 Pan American Games in Toronto. He won 6 BMX World Cup medals, 3 World Cup time trials and was 13 times Canadian national champion.

Nyhaug was born in Canada to a Finnish mother and a Canadian father. He announced his retirement from professional cycling on November 18, 2019, due to long-term damages sustained from racing injuries. He now coaches BMX.

The injuries included a ruptured spleen, which required emergency removal shortly before the 2012 Summer Olympics.
