= 2013 Beach Volleyball World Championships – Men's tournament =

Tournament details
- Host country: Poland
- Dates: 1 July – 7 July
- Teams: 48 (from 5 confederations)

Final positions
- Champions: Netherlands; Alexander Brouwer; Robert Meeuwsen (1st title)
- Runners-up: Brazil; Ricardo Santos; Álvaro Morais Filho
- Third place: Germany; Jonathan Erdmann; Kay Matysik
- Fourth place: Brazil; Alison Cerutti; Emanuel Rego

The men's tournament was held from 1 to 7 July 2013 in Stare Jabłonki, Poland.

== Preliminary round ==
Qualified for the Round of 32 as pool winners or runners-up
Qualified for the Round of 32 as one of the best four third-placed teams
Qualified for the Lucky Losers Playoffs
Eliminated

=== Pool A ===
Pos	Team	Pld	W	L	Pts	SW	SL	SR	SPW	SPL	SPR	Qualification
1	(Poland) Fijałek–Prudel	3	3	0	6	6	1	6.000	141	106	1.330	Round of 32
2	(Australia) Kapa–McHugh	3	2	1	5	5	2	2.500	128	113	1.133	Round of 32
3	(Chile) Grimalt–Grimalt	3	1	2	4	2	4	0.500	109	109	1.000	
4	(Spain) Lario–Monfort	3	0	3	3	0	6	0.000	78	128	0.609	

Date	Time		Score		Set 1	Set 2	Set 3	Total	Report
2 Jul	13:00	Fijałek–Prudel (Poland)	2–0	(Spain) Lario–Monfort	21–8	23–21		44–29	
2 Jul	13:00	Kapa–McHugh (Australia)	2–0	(Chile) Grimalt–Grimalt	21–15	21–19		42–34	
3 Jul	13:00	Fijałek–Prudel (Poland)	2–0	(Chile) Grimalt–Grimalt	21–18	21–15		42–33	
3 Jul	13:00	Kapa–McHugh (Australia)	2–0	(Spain) Lario–Monfort	21–17	21–7		42–24	
4 Jul	11:00	Grimalt–Grimalt (Chile)	2–0	(Spain) Lario–Monfort	21–12	21–13		42–25	
4 Jul	13:00	Fijałek–Prudel (Poland)	2–1	(Australia) Kapa–McHugh	21–13	19–21	15–10	55–44	

=== Pool B ===
Pos	Team	Pld	W	L	Pts	SW	SL	SR	SPW	SPL	SPR	Qualification
1	(Brazil) Alison–Emanuel	3	3	0	6	6	1	6.000	91	73	1.247	Round of 32
2	(Latvia) Pļaviņš–Pēda	3	2	1	5	4	3	1.333	124	123	1.008	Round of 32
3	(Poland) Lech–Wojtasik	3	1	2	4	4	4	1.000	93	103	0.903	Round of 32
4	(Italy) Cecchini–Ingrosso	3	0	3	3	0	6	0.000	33	126	0.262	

Date	Time		Score		Set 1	Set 2	Set 3	Total	Report
2 Jul	13:00	Pļaviņš–Pēda (Latvia)	2–0	(Italy) Cecchini–Ingrosso	21–17	21–16		42–33	
2 Jul	16:00	Alison–Emanuel (Brazil)	2–1	(Poland) Lech–Wojtasik	21–15	13–21	15–9	49–45	
3 Jul	11:00	Pļaviņš–Pēda (Latvia)	2–1	(Poland) Lech–Wojtasik	21–15	18–21	15–12	54–48	
3 Jul	15:00	Alison–Emanuel (Brazil)	2–0	(Italy) Cecchini–Ingrosso	21–0	21–0		42–0	walkover
4 Jul	09:45	Alison–Emanuel (Brazil)	2–0	(Latvia) Pļaviņš–Pēda	21–17	21–11		42–28	
4 Jul	09:45	Cecchini–Ingrosso (Italy)	0–2	(Poland) Lech–Wojtasik	0–21	0–21		0–42	walkover

=== Pool C ===
Pos	Team	Pld	W	L	Pts	SW	SL	SR	SPW	SPL	SPR	Qualification
1	(United States) Dalhausser–Rosenthal	3	3	0	6	6	1	6.000	141	114	1.237	Round of 32
2	(Mexico) Virgen–Ontiveros	3	2	1	5	4	4	1.000	131	147	0.891	Round of 32
3	(Austria) Huber–Seidl	3	1	2	4	3	4	0.750	127	116	1.095	Round of 32
4	(Switzerland) Chevallier–Kovatsch	3	0	3	3	2	6	0.333	132	154	0.857	

Date	Time		Score		Set 1	Set 2	Set 3	Total	Report
2 Jul	18:00	Dalhausser–Rosenthal (United States)	2–0	(Mexico) Virgen–Ontiveros	21–15	21–17		42–32	
2 Jul	18:00	Huber–Seidl (Austria)	2–0	(Switzerland) Chevallier–Kovatsch	21–13	21–17		42–30	
3 Jul	18:00	Dalhausser–Rosenthal (United States)	2–1	(Switzerland) Chevallier–Kovatsch	21–18	20–22	15–8	56–48	
3 Jul	18:00	Huber–Seidl (Austria)	1–2	(Mexico) Virgen–Ontiveros	18–21	21–7	12–15	51–43	
4 Jul	16:00	Dalhausser–Rosenthal (United States)	2–0	(Austria) Huber–Seidl	22–20	21–14		43–34	
4 Jul	16:00	Chevallier–Kovatsch (Switzerland)	1–2	(Mexico) Virgen–Ontiveros	19–21	22–20	13–15	54–56	

=== Pool D ===
Pos	Team	Pld	W	L	Pts	SW	SL	SR	SPW	SPL	SPR	Qualification
1	(Russia) Semenov–Koshkarev	3	3	0	6	6	3	2.000	168	145	1.159	Round of 32
2	(Ukraine) Popov–Samoday	3	2	1	5	5	3	1.667	143	135	1.059	Round of 32
3	(United States) Gibb–Patterson	3	1	2	4	3	4	0.750	121	130	0.931	Round of 32
4	(Norway) Horrem–Eithun	3	0	3	3	2	6	0.333	132	154	0.857	

Date	Time		Score		Set 1	Set 2	Set 3	Total	Report
2 Jul	19:00	Gibb–Patterson (United States)	0–2	(Ukraine) Popov–Samoday	17–21	14–21		31–42	
2 Jul	19:00	Semenov–Koshkarev (Russia)	2–1	(Norway) Horrem–Eithun	21–23	21–18	15–10	57–51	
3 Jul	19:00	Gibb–Patterson (United States)	2–0	(Norway) Horrem–Eithun	21–16	21–16		42–32	
3 Jul	19:00	Semenov–Koshkarev (Russia)	2–1	(Ukraine) Popov–Samoday	19–21	21–12	15–13	55–46	
4 Jul	17:00	Gibb–Patterson (United States)	1–2	(Russia) Semenov–Koshkarev	18–21	22–20	8–15	48–56	
4 Jul	17:00	Horrem–Eithun (Norway)	1–2	(Ukraine) Popov–Samoday	15–21	21–19	13–15	49–55	

=== Pool E ===
Pos	Team	Pld	W	L	Pts	SW	SL	SR	SPW	SPL	SPR	Qualification
1	(Spain) Herrera–Gavira	3	3	0	6	6	0	MAX	126	100	1.260	Round of 32
2	(Brazil) Evandro–Felipe	3	2	1	5	4	3	1.333	142	130	1.092	Round of 32
3	(Brazil) Pedro–Bruno	3	1	2	4	3	5	0.600	151	152	0.993	Round of 32
4	(Netherlands) van Dorsten–Oude Elferink	3	0	3	3	1	6	0.167	102	139	0.734	

Date	Time		Score		Set 1	Set 2	Set 3	Total	Report
2 Jul	12:00	van Dorsten–Oude Elferink (Netherlands)	0–2	(Spain) Herrera–Gavira	13–21	15–21		28–42	
2 Jul	12:00	Pedro–Bruno (Brazil)	1–2	(Brazil) Evandro–Felipe	19–21	25–23	17–19	61–63	
3 Jul	12:00	Evandro–Felipe (Brazil)	0–2	(Spain) Herrera–Gavira	19–21	18–21		37–42	
3 Jul	13:00	Pedro–Bruno (Brazil)	2–1	(Netherlands) van Dorsten–Oude Elferink	19–21	21–16	15–10	55–47	
4 Jul	08:45	Pedro–Bruno (Brazil)	0–2	(Spain) Herrera–Gavira	17–21	18–21		35–42	
4 Jul	08:45	Evandro–Felipe (Brazil)	2–0	(Netherlands) van Dorsten–Oude Elferink	21–13	21–14		42–27	

=== Pool F ===
Pos	Team	Pld	W	L	Pts	SW	SL	SR	SPW	SPL	SPR	Qualification
1	(Latvia) J. Šmēdiņš–Samoilovs	3	3	0	6	6	2	3.000	160	146	1.096	Round of 32
2	(Austria) Müllner–Wutzl	3	1	2	4	4	5	0.800	169	168	1.006	Round of 32
3	(Netherlands) Spijkers–Varenhorst	3	1	2	4	3	5	0.600	141	150	0.940	Round of 32
4	(Latvia) Sorokins–T. Šmēdiņš	3	1	2	4	4	5	0.800	151	157	0.962	

Date	Time		Score		Set 1	Set 2	Set 3	Total	Report
2 Jul	13:00	Spijkers–Varenhorst (Netherlands)	2–1	(Austria) Müllner–Wutzl	19–21	21–18	17–15	57–54	
2 Jul	13:00	J. Šmēdiņš–Samoilovs (Latvia)	2–1	(Latvia) Sorokins–T. Šmēdiņš	18–21	21–17	15–12	54–50	
3 Jul	13:00	J. Šmēdiņš–Samoilovs (Latvia)	2–1	(Austria) Müllner–Wutzl	21–23	22–20	21–19	64–64	
3 Jul	13:00	Spijkers–Varenhorst (Netherlands)	1–2	(Latvia) Sorokins–T. Šmēdiņš	21–16	14–21	15–17	50–54	
4 Jul	09:45	J. Šmēdiņš–Samoilovs (Latvia)	2–0	(Netherlands) Spijkers–Varenhorst	21–16	21–18		42–34	
4 Jul	09:45	Sorokins–T. Šmēdiņš (Latvia)	1–2	(Austria) Müllner–Wutzl	21–17	15–21	11–15	47–53	

=== Pool G ===
Pos	Team	Pld	W	L	Pts	SW	SL	SR	SPW	SPL	SPR	Qualification
1	(Netherlands) Nummerdor–Schuil	3	2	1	5	5	3	1.667	160	148	1.081	Round of 32
2	(Germany) Böckermann–Urbatzka	3	2	1	5	5	3	1.667	140	147	0.952	Round of 32
3	(Switzerland) Gabathuler–Weingart	3	1	2	4	2	5	0.400	137	137	1.000	
4	(Sweden) Gunnarsson–Brinkborg	3	1	2	4	4	5	0.800	160	165	0.970	

Date	Time		Score		Set 1	Set 2	Set 3	Total	Report
2 Jul	09:45	Nummerdor–Schuil (Netherlands)	1–2	(Sweden) Gunnarsson–Brinkborg	18–21	27–25	11–15	56–61	
2 Jul	11:00	Böckermann–Urbatzka (Germany)	2–0	(Switzerland) Gabathuler–Weingart	21–18	22–20		43–38	
3 Jul	11:00	Böckermann–Urbatzka (Germany)	2–1	(Sweden) Gunnarsson–Brinkborg	18–21	21–19	15–13	54–53	
3 Jul	12:00	Nummerdor–Schuil (Netherlands)	2–0	(Switzerland) Gabathuler–Weingart	26–24	22–20		48–44	
4 Jul	11:00	Gabathuler–Weingart (Switzerland)	2–1	(Sweden) Gunnarsson–Brinkborg	21–14	19–21	15–11	55–46	
4 Jul	15:00	Nummerdor–Schuil (Netherlands)	2–1	(Germany) Böckermann–Urbatzka	20–22	21–10	15–11	56–43	

=== Pool H ===
Pos	Team	Pld	W	L	Pts	SW	SL	SR	SPW	SPL	SPR	Qualification
1	(Germany) Erdmann–Matysik	3	3	0	6	6	0	MAX	126	90	1.400	Round of 32
2	(Venezuela) Hernández–Villafañe	3	2	1	5	4	4	1.000	135	135	1.000	Round of 32
3	(United States) Rogers–Doherty	3	1	2	4	3	4	0.750	120	124	0.968	Round of 32
4	(Argentina) Bianchi–Del Coto	3	0	3	3	1	6	0.167	107	139	0.770	

Date	Time		Score		Set 1	Set 2	Set 3	Total	Report
2 Jul	18:00	Rogers–Doherty (United States)	1–2	(Venezuela) Hernández–Villafañe	12–21	21–11	13–15	46–47	
2 Jul	18:00	Erdmann–Matysik (Germany)	2–0	(Argentina) Bianchi–Del Coto	21–14	21–11		42–25	
3 Jul	18:00	Rogers–Doherty (United States)	2–0	(Argentina) Bianchi–Del Coto	21–18	21–17		42–35	
3 Jul	18:00	Erdmann–Matysik (Germany)	2–0	(Venezuela) Hernández–Villafañe	21–18	21–15		42–33	
4 Jul	16:00	Erdmann–Matysik (Germany)	2–0	(United States) Rogers–Doherty	21–19	21–13		42–32	
4 Jul	16:00	Hernández–Villafañe (Venezuela)	2–1	(Argentina) Bianchi–Del Coto	21–15	19–21	15–11	55–47	

=== Pool J ===
Pos	Team	Pld	W	L	Pts	SW	SL	SR	SPW	SPL	SPR	Qualification
1	(Italy) Nicolai–Lupo	3	3	0	6	6	1	6.000	130	116	1.121	Round of 32
2	(Canada) Saxton–Schalk	3	1	2	4	4	4	1.000	147	119	1.235	Round of 32
3	(United States) Lucena–Hyden	3	1	2	4	3	5	0.600	136	157	0.866	
4	(Germany) Fuchs–Kaczmarek	3	1	2	4	2	5	0.400	122	143	0.853	

Date	Time		Score		Set 1	Set 2	Set 3	Total	Report
2 Jul	19:00	Fuchs–Kaczmarek (Germany)	2–1	(United States) Lucena–Hyden	17–21	21–16	24–22	62–59	
2 Jul	19:00	Nicolai–Lupo (Italy)	2–1	(Canada) Saxton–Schalk	10–21	21–18	15–13	46–52	
3 Jul	19:00	Nicolai–Lupo (Italy)	2–0	(United States) Lucena–Hyden	21–17	21–15		42–32	
3 Jul	19:00	Fuchs–Kaczmarek (Germany)	0–2	(Canada) Saxton–Schalk	18–21	10–21		28–42	
4 Jul	17:00	Nicolai–Lupo (Italy)	2–0	(Germany) Fuchs–Kaczmarek	21–16	21–16		42–32	
4 Jul	17:00	Lucena–Hyden (United States)	2–1	(Canada) Saxton–Schalk	8–21	22–20	15–12	45–53	

=== Pool K ===
Pos	Team	Pld	W	L	Pts	SW	SL	SR	SPW	SPL	SPR	Qualification
1	(Austria) Doppler–Horst	3	3	0	6	6	1	6.000	139	115	1.209	Round of 32
2	(Brazil) Ricardo–Filho	3	2	1	5	5	2	2.500	137	125	1.096	Round of 32
3	(Czech Republic) Kubala–Beneš	3	1	2	4	2	5	0.400	128	142	0.901	
4	(Kazakhstan) Yakovlev–Kuleshov	3	0	3	3	1	6	0.167	124	146	0.849	

Date	Time		Score		Set 1	Set 2	Set 3	Total	Report
2 Jul	18:00	Doppler–Horst (Austria)	2–0	(Czech Republic) Kubala–Beneš	21–17	21–13		42–30	
2 Jul	19:00	Ricardo–Filho (Brazil)	2–0	(Kazakhstan) Yakovlev–Kuleshov	21–16	21–18		42–34	
3 Jul	11:00	Ricardo–Filho (Brazil)	2–0	(Czech Republic) Kubala–Beneš	21–16	22–20		43–36	
3 Jul	19:00	Doppler–Horst (Austria)	2–0	(Kazakhstan) Yakovlev–Kuleshov	21–18	21–15		42–33	
4 Jul	15:00	Ricardo–Filho (Brazil)	1–2	(Austria) Doppler–Horst	19–21	21–19	12–15	52–55	
4 Jul	15:00	Kubala–Beneš (Czech Republic)	2–1	(Kazakhstan) Yakovlev–Kuleshov	21–16	26–28	15–13	62–57	

=== Pool L ===
Pos	Team	Pld	W	L	Pts	SW	SL	SR	SPW	SPL	SPR	Qualification
1	(Poland) Kantor–Łosiak	3	3	0	6	6	1	6.000	152	134	1.134	Round of 32
2	(Kazakhstan) Sidorenko–Dyachenko	3	2	1	5	4	2	2.000	123	118	1.042	Round of 32
3	(Germany) Dollinger–Windscheif	3	1	2	4	3	4	0.750	131	129	1.016	Round of 32
4	(Russia) Prokopyev–Bogatov	3	0	3	3	0	6	0.000	116	141	0.823	

Date	Time		Score		Set 1	Set 2	Set 3	Total	Report
2 Jul	12:00	Sidorenko–Dyachenko (Kazakhstan)	2–0	(Russia) Prokopyev–Bogatov	23–21	21–19		44–40	
2 Jul	12:00	Dollinger–Windscheif (Germany)	1–2	(Poland) Kantor–Łosiak	19–21	22–20	11–15	52–56	
3 Jul	12:00	Dollinger–Windscheif (Germany)	2–0	(Russia) Prokopyev–Bogatov	21–10	22–20		43–30	
3 Jul	18:00	Sidorenko–Dyachenko (Kazakhstan)	0–2	(Poland) Kantor–Łosiak	19–21	17–21		36–42	
4 Jul	08:45	Prokopyev–Bogatov (Russia)	0–2	(Poland) Kantor–Łosiak	31–33	15–21		46–54	
4 Jul	08:45	Dollinger–Windscheif (Germany)	0–2	(Kazakhstan) Sidorenko–Dyachenko	16–21	20–22		36–43	

=== Pool M ===
Pos	Team	Pld	W	L	Pts	SW	SL	SR	SPW	SPL	SPR	Qualification
1	(Poland) Kądzioła–Szałankiewicz	3	2	1	5	5	2	2.500	136	121	1.124	Round of 32
2	(Czech Republic) Kufa–Hadrava	3	2	1	5	5	3	1.667	146	130	1.123	Round of 32
3	(Netherlands) Brouwer–Meeuwsen	3	2	1	5	4	3	1.333	129	122	1.057	Round of 32
4	(Venezuela) Jackson–Leon	3	0	3	3	0	6	0.000	88	126	0.698	

Date	Time		Score		Set 1	Set 2	Set 3	Total	Report
2 Jul	14:00	Kądzioła–Szałankiewicz (Poland)	1–2	(Czech Republic) Kufa–Hadrava	21–19	19–21	12–15	52–55	
2 Jul	17:00	Brouwer–Meeuwsen (Netherlands)	2–0	(Venezuela) Jackson–Leon	21–16	21–15		42–31	
3 Jul	12:00	Kądzioła–Szałankiewicz (Poland)	2–0	(Venezuela) Jackson–Leon	21–14	21–15		42–29	
3 Jul	17:00	Brouwer–Meeuwsen (Netherlands)	2–1	(Czech Republic) Kufa–Hadrava	14–21	21–19	15–9	50–49	
4 Jul	11:00	Kądzioła–Szałankiewicz (Poland)	2–0	(Netherlands) Brouwer–Meeuwsen	21–19	21–18		42–37	
4 Jul	15:00	Jackson–Leon (Venezuela)	0–2	(Czech Republic) Kufa–Hadrava	15–21	13–21		28–42	

=== Ranking of third-placed teams ===
The eight best third-placed teams advanced to the round of 32.

Pos	Team	Pld	W	L	Pts	SW	SL	SR	SPW	SPL	SPR	Qualification
1	(Netherlands) Brouwer–Meeuwsen	3	2	1	5	4	3	1.333	129	122	1.057	Round of 32
2	(Poland) Lech–Wojtasik	3	1	2	4	4	4	1.000	93	103	0.903	Round of 32
3	(Austria) Huber–Seidl	3	1	2	4	3	4	0.750	127	116	1.095	Round of 32
4	(Germany) Dollinger–Windscheif	3	1	2	4	3	4	0.750	131	129	1.016	Round of 32
5	(United States) Rogers–Doherty	3	1	2	4	3	4	0.750	120	124	0.968	Round of 32
6	(United States) Gibb–Patterson	3	1	2	4	3	4	0.750	121	130	0.931	Round of 32
7	(Brazil) Pedro–Bruno	3	1	2	4	3	5	0.600	151	152	0.993	Round of 32
8	(Netherlands) Spijkers–Varenhorst	3	1	2	4	3	5	0.600	141	150	0.940	Round of 32
9	(United States) Lucena–Hyden	3	1	2	4	3	5	0.600	136	157	0.866	
10	(Chile) Grimalt–Grimalt	3	1	2	4	2	4	0.500	109	108	1.009	
11	(Switzerland) Gabathuler–Weingart	3	1	2	4	2	5	0.400	137	137	1.000	
12	(Czech Republic) Kubala–Beneš	3	1	2	4	2	5	0.400	128	142	0.901	

=== Knockout stage ===
==== Round of 32 ====
Date	Time		Score		Set 1	Set 2	Set 3	Total	Report
5 Jul	13:00	Fijałek–Prudel (Poland)	0–2	(Brazil) Pedro–Bruno	17–21	16–21		33–42	
5 Jul	13:00	Kapa–McHugh (Australia)	2–1	(Latvia) Pļaviņš–Pēda	21–15	16–21	15–3	52–39	
5 Jul	13:00	Doppler–Horst (Austria)	2–0	(Mexico) Virgen–Ontiveros	21–18	21–17		42–35	
5 Jul	13:00	Nummerdor–Schuil (Netherlands)	0–2	(Netherlands) Brouwer–Meeuwsen	19–21	18–21		37–42	
5 Jul	15:00	Erdmann–Matysik (Germany)	2–0	(Austria) Huber–Seidl	24–22	21–17		45–39	
5 Jul	15:00	Kądzioła–Szałankiewicz (Poland)	2–0	(Austria) Müllner–Wutzl	21–16	21–15		42–31	
5 Jul	15:00	Kufa–Hadrava (Czech Republic)	0–2	(Brazil) Evandro–Felipe	15–21	14–21		29–42	
5 Jul	15:00	Spijkers–Varenhorst (Netherlands)	0–2	(Russia) Semenov–Koshkarev	18–21	32–34		50–55	
5 Jul	16:00	Dalhausser–Rosenthal (United States)	2–0	(United States) Gibb–Patterson	23–21	21–16		44–37	
5 Jul	16:00	Ricardo–Filho (Brazil)	2–0	(Ukraine) Popov–Samoday	21–9	21–18		42–27	
5 Jul	16:00	J. Šmēdiņš–Samoilovs (Latvia)	2–0	(Germany) Dollinger–Windscheif	22–20	27–25		49–45	
5 Jul	16:00	Kantor–Łosiak (Poland)	1–2	(Canada) Saxton–Schalk	19–21	29–27	8–15	56–63	
5 Jul	17:00	Nicolai–Lupo (Italy)	2–0	(Venezuela) Hernández–Villafañe	22–20	21–19		43–39	
5 Jul	17:00	Herrera–Gavira (Spain)	2–1	(Poland) Lech–Wojtasik	21–19	15–21	15–11	51–51	
5 Jul	17:00	Sidorenko–Dyachenko (Kazakhstan)	0–2	(Germany) Böckermann–Urbatzka	27–29	33–35		60–64	
5 Jul	17:00	Rogers–Doherty (United States)	0–2	(Brazil) Alison–Emanuel	19–21	12–21		31–42	

==== Round of 16 ====
Date	Time		Score		Set 1	Set 2	Set 3	Total	Report
6 Jul	09:45	Erdmann–Matysik (Germany)	2–0	(Poland) Kądzioła–Szałankiewicz	21–18	21–15		42–33	
6 Jul	09:45	Evandro–Felipe (Brazil)	2–1	(Russia) Semenov–Koshkarev	21–16	17–21	15–10	53–47	
6 Jul	09:45	J. Šmēdiņš–Samoilovs (Latvia)	0–2	(Canada) Saxton–Schalk	15–21	18–21		33–42	
6 Jul	09:45	Böckermann–Urbatzka (Germany)	1–2	(Brazil) Alison–Emanuel	21–15	16–21	10–15	47–51	
6 Jul	10:45	Pedro–Bruno (Brazil)	2–0	(Australia) Kapa–McHugh	21–18	21–14		42–32	
6 Jul	10:45	Doppler–Horst (Austria)	0–2	(Netherlands) Brouwer–Meeuwsen	19–21	22–24		41–46	
6 Jul	10:45	Dalhausser–Rosenthal (United States)	0–2	(Brazil) Ricardo–Filho	18–21	17–21		35–42	
6 Jul	10:45	Nicolai–Lupo (Italy)	0–2	(Spain) Herrera–Gavira	19–21	16–21		35–42	

==== Quarterfinals ====
Date	Time		Score		Set 1	Set 2	Set 3	Total	Report
6 Jul	14:45	Erdmann–Matysik (Germany)	2–0	(Brazil) Evandro–Felipe	21–17	21–19		42–36	
6 Jul	14:45	Saxton–Schalk (Canada)	0–2	(Brazil) Alison–Emanuel	17–21	20–22		37–43	
6 Jul	15:45	Pedro–Bruno (Brazil)	1–2	(Netherlands) Brouwer–Meeuwsen	17–21	21–19	19–21	57–61	
6 Jul	15:45	Ricardo–Filho (Brazil)	2–0	(Spain) Herrera–Gavira	21–9	21–18		42–27	

==== Semifinals ====
Date	Time		Score		Set 1	Set 2	Set 3	Total	Report
7 Jul	12:00	Brouwer–Meeuwsen (Netherlands)	2–0	(Germany) Erdmann–Matysik	21–13	21–17		42–30	
7 Jul	13:00	Ricardo–Filho (Brazil)	2–0	(Brazil) Alison–Emanuel	21–14	22–20		43–34	

==== Third place game ====
Date	Time		Score		Set 1	Set 2	Set 3	Total	Report
7 Jul	17:00	Erdmann–Matysik (Germany)	2–0	(Brazil) Alison–Emanuel	21–17	21–19		42–36	

==== Final ====
Date	Time		Score		Set 1	Set 2	Set 3	Total	Report
7 Jul	18:00	Brouwer–Meeuwsen (Netherlands)	2–0	(Brazil) Ricardo–Filho	21–18	21–16		42–34	
