= 2011 Beach Volleyball World Championships – Men's tournament =

Tournament details
- Host country: Italy
- City: Rome
- Dates: 13 June – 19 June
- Teams: 48 (from 5 confederations)

Final positions
- Champions: Brazil; Emanuel Rego; Alison Cerutti (1st title)
- Runners-up: Brazil; Márcio Araújo; Ricardo Santos
- Third place: Germany; Julius Brink; Jonas Reckermann
- Fourth place: Latvia; Mārtiņš Pļaviņš; Mārtiņš Pļaviņš

The men's tournament was held from June 13 to 19, 2011 in Rome, Italy.

== Preliminary round ==
Qualified for the Round of 32 as pool winners or runners-up
Qualified for the Round of 32 as one of the best four third-placed teams
Qualified for the Lucky Losers Playoffs
Eliminated

=== Pool A ===
Pos	Team	Pld	W	L	Pts	SW	SL	SR	SPW	SPL	SPR	Qualification
1	(United States) Jennings–Wong	3	3	0	6	6	1	6.000	140	92	1.522	Round of 32
2	(United States) Rogers–Dalhausser	3	2	1	5	4	2	2.000	116	101	1.149	Round of 32
3	(France) Cès–Cès	3	1	2	4	3	4	0.750	114	118	0.966	3rd place ranking
4	(Angola) Morais–Silva	3	0	3	3	0	6	0.000	67	126	0.532	Eliminated

Date		Score		Set 1	Set 2	Set 3
13 Jun	Cès–Cès (France)	2–0	(Angola) Morais–Silva	21–11	21–10	
13 Jun	Rogers–Dalhausser (United States)	0–2	(United States) Jennings–Wong	20–22	12–21	
14 Jun	Jennings–Wong (United States)	2–1	(France) Cès–Cès	19–21	21–9	15–10
14 Jun	Rogers–Dalhausser (United States)	2–0	(Angola) Morais–Silva	21–13	21–13	
15 Jun	Jennings–Wong (United States)	2–0	(Angola) Morais–Silva	21–12	21–8	
15 Jun	Rogers–Dalhausser (United States)	2–0	(France) Cès–Cès	21–19	21–13	

=== Pool B ===
Pos	Team	Pld	W	L	Pts	SW	SL	SR	SPW	SPL	SPR	Qualification
1	(Brazil) Emanuel–Alison	3	3	0	6	6	1	6.000	142	115	1.235	Round of 32
2	(Denmark) Søderberg–Hoyer	3	2	1	5	5	3	1.667	150	145	1.034	Round of 32
3	(New Zealand) Lochhead–Pitman	3	1	2	4	3	4	0.750	133	130	1.023	3rd place ranking
4	(Ukraine) Babich–Ioisher	3	0	3	3	0	6	0.000	92	127	0.724	Eliminated

Date		Score		Set 1	Set 2	Set 3
14 Jun	Søderberg–Hoyer (Denmark)	2–0	(Ukraine) Babich–Ioisher	22–20	21–13	
14 Jun	Emanuel–Alison (Brazil)	2–0	(New Zealand) Lochhead–Pitman	21–19	21–18	
15 Jun	Lochhead–Pitman (New Zealand)	2–0	(Ukraine) Babich–Ioisher	21–19	21–14	
15 Jun	Emanuel–Alison (Brazil)	2–1	(Denmark) Søderberg–Hoyer	21–18	22–24	15–10
16 Jun	Søderberg–Hoyer (Denmark)	2–1	(New Zealand) Lochhead–Pitman	21–18	17–21	17–15
16 Jun	Emanuel–Alison (Brazil)	2–0	(Ukraine) Babich–Ioisher	21–13	21–13	

=== Pool C ===
Pos	Team	Pld	W	L	Pts	SW	SL	SR	SPW	SPL	SPR	Qualification
1	(Brazil) Araújo–Ricardo	3	2	1	5	5	4	1.250	163	155	1.052	Round of 32
2	(Switzerland) Gabathuler–Schnider	3	2	1	5	5	3	1.667	151	136	1.110	Round of 32
3	(Canada) Redmann–Saxton	3	1	2	4	4	4	1.000	145	145	1.000	3rd place ranking
4	(Netherlands) Boersma–Spijkers	3	1	2	4	2	5	0.400	109	132	0.826	Eliminated

Date		Score		Set 1	Set 2	Set 3
14 Jun	Boersma–Spijkers (Netherlands)	0–2	(Canada) Redmann–Saxton	18–21	17–21	
14 Jun	Araújo–Ricardo (Brazil)	2–1	(Switzerland) Gabathuler–Schnider	21–15	19–21	20–18
15 Jun	Gabathuler–Schnider (Switzerland)	2–1	(Canada) Redmann–Saxton	21–17	19–21	15–21
15 Jun	Araújo–Ricardo (Brazil)	1–2	(Netherlands) Boersma–Spijkers	21–12	17–21	10–15
16 Jun	Boersma–Spijkers (Netherlands)	0–2	(Switzerland) Gabathuler–Schnider	14–21	12–21	
16 Jun	Araújo–Ricardo (Brazil)	2–1	(Canada) Redmann–Saxton	23–21	17–21	15–11

=== Pool D ===
Pos	Team	Pld	W	L	Pts	SW	SL	SR	SPW	SPL	SPR	Qualification
1	(Germany) Brink–Reckermann	3	3	0	6	6	0	MAX	126	86	1.465	Round of 32
2	(Switzerland) Heuscher–Bellaguarda	3	2	1	5	4	4	1.000	133	148	0.899	Round of 32
3	(Poland) Kądzioła–Szałankiewicz	3	1	2	4	3	4	0.750	130	130	1.000	3rd place ranking
4	(Russia) Likholetov–Pastukhov	3	0	3	3	1	6	0.167	111	136	0.816	Eliminated

Date		Score		Set 1	Set 2	Set 3
14 Jun	Heuscher–Bellaguarda (Switzerland)	2–1	(Poland) Kądzioła–Szałankiewicz	22–20	14–21	16–14
14 Jun	Brink–Reckermann (Germany)	2–0	(Russia) Likholetov–Pastukhov	21–11	21–13	
15 Jun	Likholetov–Pastukhov (Russia)	0–2	(Poland) Kądzioła–Szałankiewicz	16–21	20–22	
15 Jun	Brink–Reckermann (Germany)	2–0	(Switzerland) Heuscher–Bellaguarda	21–13	21–17	
16 Jun	Heuscher–Bellaguarda (Switzerland)	2–1	(Russia) Likholetov–Pastukhov	21–17	15–21	15–13
16 Jun	Brink–Reckermann (Germany)	2–0	(Poland) Kądzioła–Szałankiewicz	21–18	21–14	

=== Pool E ===
Pos	Team	Pld	W	L	Pts	SW	SL	SR	SPW	SPL	SPR	Qualification
1	(Germany) Erdmann–Matysik	3	2	1	5	5	3	1.667	145	127	1.142	Round of 32
2	(Switzerland) Heyer–Chevallier	3	2	1	5	4	3	1.333	138	131	1.053	Round of 32
3	(Austria) Doppler–Mellitzer	3	1	2	4	3	4	0.750	133	134	0.993	3rd place ranking
4	(Germany) Klemperer–Koreng	3	1	2	4	3	5	0.600	122	146	0.836	Eliminated

Date		Score		Set 1	Set 2	Set 3
13 Jun	Heyer–Chevallier (Switzerland)	2–0	(Austria) Doppler–Mellitzer	27–25	21–19	
13 Jun	Klemperer–Koreng (Germany)	2–0	(Germany) Erdmann–Matysik	7–21	21–15	16–14
15 Jun	Erdmann–Matysik (Germany)	2–1	(Austria) Doppler–Mellitzer	17–21	21–18	15–8
15 Jun	Klemperer–Koreng (Germany)	1–2	(Switzerland) Heyer–Chevallier	12–21	21–18	12–15
16 Jun	Erdmann–Matysik (Germany)	2–0	(Switzerland) Heyer–Chevallier	21–19	21–17	
16 Jun	Klemperer–Koreng (Germany)	0–2	(Austria) Doppler–Mellitzer	14–21	19–21	

=== Pool F ===
Pos	Team	Pld	W	L	Pts	SW	SL	SR	SPW	SPL	SPR	Qualification
1	(Poland) Fijałek–Prudel	3	3	0	6	6	0	MAX	129	107	1.206	Round of 32
2	(China) Xu–Wu	3	2	1	5	4	3	1.333	137	123	1.114	Round of 32
3	(Italy) Tomatis–Lupo	3	1	2	4	2	4	0.500	104	119	0.874	3rd place ranking
4	(Norway) Skarlund–Spinnangr	3	0	3	3	1	6	0.167	118	139	0.849	Eliminated

Date		Score		Set 1	Set 2	Set 3
14 Jun	Skarlund–Spinnangr (Norway)	0–2	(Italy) Tomatis–Lupo	17–21	18–21	
14 Jun	Xu–Wu (China)	0–2	(Poland) Fijałek–Prudel	18–21	22–24	
15 Jun	Fijałek–Prudel (Poland)	2–0	(Italy) Tomatis–Lupo	21–19	21–14	
15 Jun	Xu–Wu (China)	2–1	(Norway) Skarlund–Spinnangr	19–21	21–17	15–11
16 Jun	Skarlund–Spinnangr (Norway)	0–2	(Poland) Fijałek–Prudel	18–21	16–21	
16 Jun	Xu–Wu (China)	2–0	(Italy) Tomatis–Lupo	21–16	21–13	

=== Pool G ===
Pos	Team	Pld	W	L	Pts	SW	SL	SR	SPW	SPL	SPR	Qualification
1	(United States) Fuerbringer–Lucena	3	3	0	6	6	1	6.000	138	110	1.255	Round of 32
2	(Brazil) Thiago–Harley	3	1	2	4	3	4	0.750	123	128	0.961	Round of 32
3	(Georgia (country)) Geor–Gia	3	1	2	4	3	4	0.750	118	126	0.937	3rd place ranking
4	(Australia) Boehm–Kapa	3	1	2	4	2	5	0.400	119	134	0.888	Eliminated

Date		Score		Set 1	Set 2	Set 3
13 Jun	Geor–Gia (Georgia (country))	2–0	(Australia) Boehm–Kapa	21–16	21–14	
13 Jun	Fuerbringer–Lucena (United States)	2–0	(Brazil) Thiago–Harley	21–14	21–17	
14 Jun	Thiago–Harley (Brazil)	2–0	(Georgia (country)) Geor–Gia	21–13	21–19	
14 Jun	Fuerbringer–Lucena (United States)	2–0	(Australia) Boehm–Kapa	21–16	21–19	
15 Jun	Thiago–Harley (Brazil)	1–2	(Australia) Boehm–Kapa	21–18	19–21	10–15
15 Jun	Fuerbringer–Lucena (United States)	2–1	(Georgia (country)) Geor–Gia	18–21	21–13	15–10

=== Pool H ===
Pos	Team	Pld	W	L	Pts	SW	SL	SR	SPW	SPL	SPR	Qualification
1	(Netherlands) Nummerdor–Schuil	3	3	0	6	6	0	MAX	126	102	1.235	Round of 32
2	(Brazil) Bruno–Benjamin	3	2	1	5	4	4	1.000	150	157	0.955	Round of 32
3	(Spain) Mesa–Lario	3	1	2	4	3	4	0.750	141	139	1.014	3rd place ranking
4	(Kazakhstan) Sidorenko–Dyachenko	3	0	3	3	1	6	0.167	127	146	0.870	Eliminated

Date		Score		Set 1	Set 2	Set 3
13 Jun	Nummerdor–Schuil (Netherlands)	2–0	(Kazakhstan) Sidorenko–Dyachenko	21–19	21–15	
13 Jun	Bruno–Benjamin (Brazil)	2–1	(Spain) Mesa–Lario	15–21	21–18	23–21
15 Jun	Mesa–Lario (Spain)	2–0	(Kazakhstan) Sidorenko–Dyachenko	21–16	24–22	
15 Jun	Bruno–Benjamin (Brazil)	0–2	(Netherlands) Nummerdor–Schuil	14–21	18–21	
16 Jun	Nummerdor–Schuil (Netherlands)	2–0	(Spain) Mesa–Lario	21–17	21–19	
16 Jun	Bruno–Benjamin (Brazil)	2–1	(Kazakhstan) Sidorenko–Dyachenko	26–24	18–21	15–10

=== Pool J ===
Pos	Team	Pld	W	L	Pts	SW	SL	SR	SPW	SPL	SPR	Qualification
1	(Spain) Herrera–Gavira	3	2	1	5	5	2	2.500	151	133	1.135	Round of 32
2	(Russia) Semenov–Koshkarev	3	2	1	5	5	4	1.250	164	165	0.994	Round of 32
3	(Austria) Müllner–Horst	3	2	1	5	4	4	1.000	139	139	1.000	3rd place ranking
4	(Switzerland) Laciga–Weingart	3	0	3	3	2	6	0.333	150	167	0.898	Eliminated

Date		Score		Set 1	Set 2	Set 3
13 Jun	Semenov–Koshkarev (Russia)	2–1	(Switzerland) Laciga–Weingart	21–17	17–21	22–20
13 Jun	Herrera–Gavira (Spain)	2–0	(Austria) Müllner–Horst	21–19	21–15	
14 Jun	Müllner–Horst (Austria)	2–1	(Switzerland) Laciga–Weingart	18–21	21–17	15–8
14 Jun	Herrera–Gavira (Spain)	1–2	(Russia) Semenov–Koshkarev	21–14	21–23	14–16
15 Jun	Semenov–Koshkarev (Russia)	1–2	(Austria) Müllner–Horst	21–14	20–22	10–15
15 Jun	Herrera–Gavira (Spain)	2–0	(Switzerland) Laciga–Weingart	32–30	21–16	

=== Pool K ===
Pos	Team	Pld	W	L	Pts	SW	SL	SR	SPW	SPL	SPR	Qualification
1	(Latvia) Pļaviņš–Šmēdiņš	3	3	0	6	6	0	MAX	126	99	1.273	Round of 32
2	(United States) Gibb–Rosenthal	3	2	1	5	4	3	1.333	134	135	0.993	Round of 32
3	(Estonia) Vesik–Jaani	3	1	2	4	3	4	0.750	131	129	1.016	3rd place ranking
4	(Russia) Prokopiev–Bogatov	3	0	3	3	0	6	0.000	98	126	0.778	Eliminated

Date		Score		Set 1	Set 2	Set 3
13 Jun	Pļaviņš–Šmēdiņš (Latvia)	2–0	(Russia) Prokopiev–Bogatov	21–18	21–16	
13 Jun	Gibb–Rosenthal (United States)	2–1	(Estonia) Vesik–Jaani	17–21	24–22	17–15
15 Jun	Pļaviņš–Šmēdiņš (Latvia)	2–0	(Estonia) Vesik–Jaani	21–16	21–15	
15 Jun	Gibb–Rosenthal (United States)	2–0	(Russia) Prokopiev–Bogatov	21–17	21–18	
16 Jun	Vesik–Jaani (Estonia)	2–0	(Russia) Prokopiev–Bogatov	21–17	21–12	
16 Jun	Gibb–Rosenthal (United States)	0–2	(Latvia) Pļaviņš–Šmēdiņš	15–21	19–21	

=== Pool L ===
Pos	Team	Pld	W	L	Pts	SW	SL	SR	SPW	SPL	SPR	Qualification
1	(Czech Republic) Beneš–Kubala	2	2	0	4	6	2	3.000	151	137	1.102	Round of 32
2	(Latvia) Samoilovs–Sorokins	3	1	2	4	3	4	0.750	128	130	0.985	Round of 32
3	(Italy) Nicolai–Martino	3	1	2	4	4	5	0.800	154	157	0.981	3rd place ranking
4	(Sweden) Gunnarsson–Brinkborg	3	1	2	4	3	5	0.600	146	155	0.942	Eliminated

Date		Score		Set 1	Set 2	Set 3
13 Jun	Nicolai–Martino (Italy)	2–1	(Latvia) Samoilovs–Sorokins	21–17	15–21	15–11
13 Jun	Beneš–Kubala (Czech Republic)	2–1	(Sweden) Gunnarsson–Brinkborg	21–19	20–22	15–13
14 Jun	Nicolai–Martino (Italy)	1–2	(Sweden) Gunnarsson–Brinkborg	21–17	21–23	13–15
14 Jun	Beneš–Kubala (Czech Republic)	2–0	(Latvia) Samoilovs–Sorokins	21–19	21–16	
15 Jun	Gunnarsson–Brinkborg (Sweden)	0–2	(Latvia) Samoilovs–Sorokins	16–21	21–23	
15 Jun	Beneš–Kubala (Czech Republic)	2–1	(Italy) Nicolai–Martino	17–21	21–19	15–8

=== Pool M ===
Pos	Team	Pld	W	L	Pts	SW	SL	SR	SPW	SPL	SPR	Qualification
1	(Brazil) Ferramenta–Pedro	3	3	0	6	6	1	6.000	140	108	1.296	Round of 32
2	(Germany) Dollinger–Windscheif	3	2	1	5	4	3	1.333	122	132	0.924	Round of 32
3	(Italy) Ingrosso–Ingrosso	3	1	2	4	3	4	0.750	123	128	0.961	3rd place ranking
4	(Russia) Barsouk–Yutvalin	3	0	3	3	1	6	0.167	119	136	0.875	Eliminated

Date		Score		Set 1	Set 2	Set 3
13 Jun	Ingrosso–Ingrosso (Italy)	2–0	(Russia) Barsouk–Yutvalin	21–14	21–16	
13 Jun	Ferramenta–Pedro (Brazil)	2–0	(Germany) Dollinger–Windscheif	21–12	21–16	
14 Jun	Dollinger–Windscheif (Germany)	2–1	(Russia) Barsouk–Yutvalin	15–21	22–20	15–13
14 Jun	Ferramenta–Pedro (Brazil)	2–1	(Italy) Ingrosso–Ingrosso	20–22	21–10	15–13
16 Jun	Ingrosso–Ingrosso (Italy)	0–2	(Germany) Dollinger–Windscheif	18–21	18–21	
16 Jun	Ferramenta–Pedro (Brazil)	2–0	(Russia) Barsouk–Yutvalin	21–19	21–16	

=== 3rd place ranked teams ===
The eight best third-placed teams will advance to the round of 32.

Pos	Team	Pld	W	L	Pts	SW	SL	SR	SPW	SPL	SPR	Qualification
1	(Austria) Müllner–Horst	3	2	1	5	4	4	1.000	139	139	1.000	Round of 32
2	(Canada) Redmann–Saxton	3	1	2	4	4	4	1.000	145	145	1.000	Round of 32
3	(Italy) Nicolai–Martino	3	1	2	4	4	5	0.800	154	157	0.981	Round of 32
4	(New Zealand) Lochhead–Pitman	3	1	2	4	3	4	0.750	133	130	1.023	Round of 32
5	(Estonia) Vesik–Jaani	3	1	2	4	3	4	0.750	131	129	1.016	Round of 32
6	(Spain) Mesa–Lario	3	1	2	4	3	4	0.750	141	139	1.014	Round of 32
7	(Poland) Kądzioła–Szałankiewicz	3	1	2	4	3	4	0.750	130	130	1.000	Round of 32
8	(Austria) Doppler–Mellitzer	3	1	2	4	3	4	0.750	133	134	0.993	Round of 32
9	(France) Cès–Cès	3	1	2	4	3	4	0.750	114	118	0.966	Eliminated
10	(Italy) Ingrosso–Ingrosso	3	1	2	4	3	4	0.750	123	128	0.961	Eliminated
11	(Georgia (country)) Geor–Gia	3	1	2	4	3	4	0.750	118	126	0.937	Eliminated
12	(Italy) Tomatis–Lupo	3	1	2	4	2	4	0.500	104	119	0.874	Eliminated

=== Knockout round ===
==== Round of 32 ====
Date		Score		Set 1	Set 2	Set 3
17 Jun	Mesa–Lario (Spain)	0–2	(Brazil) Emanuel–Alison	16–21	15–21	
17 Jun	Xu–Wu (China)	0–2	(Russia) Semenov–Koshkarev	19–21	17–21	
17 Jun	Ferramenta–Pedro (Brazil)	2–1	(Latvia) Samoilovs–Sorokins	21–19	14–21	15–10
17 Jun	Fuerbringer–Lucena (United States)	2–1	(Austria) Müllner–Horst	21–18	17–21	15–8
17 Jun	Fijałek–Prudel (Poland)	2–0	(Canada) Redmann–Saxton	21–18	21–19	
17 Jun	Beneš–Kubala (Czech Republic)	1–2	(Brazil) Bruno–Benjamin	21–19	17–21	9–15
17 Jun	Rogers–Dalhausser (United States)	2–0	(United States) Gibb–Rosenthal	21–14	21–18	
17 Jun	Brink–Reckermann (Germany)	2–0	(Estonia) Vesik–Jaani	21–17	21–19	
17 Jun	Kądzioła–Szałankiewicz (Poland)	0–2	(Brazil) Araújo–Ricardo	13–21	17–21	
17 Jun	Gabathuler–Schnider (Switzerland)	1–2	(Germany) Dollinger–Windscheif	21–12	18–21	12–15
17 Jun	Herrera–Gavira (Spain)	2–1	(Switzerland) Heuscher–Bellaguarda	18–21	21–13	15–13
17 Jun	Nummerdor–Schuil (Netherlands)	0–2	(Italy) Nicolai–Martino	17–21	22–24	
17 Jun	Erdmann–Matysik (Germany)	2–0	(New Zealand) Lochhead–Pitman	21–15	21–14	
17 Jun	Pļaviņš–Šmēdiņš (Latvia)	2–0	(Brazil) Thiago–Harley	21–15	21–12	
17 Jun	Søderberg–Hoyer (Denmark)	2–0	(Switzerland) Heyer–Chevallier	21–18	21–18	
17 Jun	Jennings–Wong (United States)	1–2	(Austria) Doppler–Mellitzer	21–17	16–21	16–18

==== Round of 16 ====
Date		Score		Set 1	Set 2	Set 3
17 Jun	Semenov–Koshkarev (Russia)	0–2	(Brazil) Emanuel–Alison	17–21	17–21	
17 Jun	Fuerbringer–Lucena (United States)	1–2	(Brazil) Ferramenta–Pedro	19–21	21–15	13–15
17 Jun	Bruno–Benjamin (Brazil)	0–2	(Poland) Fijałek–Prudel	13–21	16–21	
17 Jun	Brink–Reckermann (Germany)	2–1	(United States) Rogers–Dalhausser	17–21	21–19	18–16
17 Jun	Dollinger–Windscheif (Germany)	1–2	(Brazil) Araújo–Ricardo	20–22	21–19	21–23
17 Jun	Nicolai–Martino (Italy)	1–2	(Spain) Herrera–Gavira	18–21	21–18	11–15
17 Jun	Pļaviņš–Šmēdiņš (Latvia)	2–1	(Germany) Erdmann–Matysik	21–17	16–21	19–17
17 Jun	Doppler–Mellitzer (Austria)	0–2	(Denmark) Søderberg–Hoyer	12–21	18–21	

==== Quarterfinals ====
Date		Score		Set 1	Set 2	Set 3
18 Jun	Ferramenta–Pedro (Brazil)	0–2	(Brazil) Emanuel–Alison	20–22	16–21	
18 Jun	Brink–Reckermann (Germany)	2–0	(Poland) Fijałek–Prudel	21–15	21–16	
18 Jun	Herrera–Gavira (Spain)	0–2	(Brazil) Araújo–Ricardo	18–21	17–21	
18 Jun	Søderberg–Hoyer (Denmark)	0–2	(Latvia) Pļaviņš–Šmēdiņš	19–21	17–21	

==== Semifinals ====
Date		Score		Set 1	Set 2	Set 3
18 Jun	Brink–Reckermann (Germany)	0–2	(Brazil) Emanuel–Alison	15–21	15–21	
18 Jun	Pļaviņš–Šmēdiņš (Latvia)	0–2	(Brazil) Araújo–Ricardo	20–22	16–21	

==== Bronze medal Match ====
Date		Score		Set 1	Set 2	Set 3
19 Jun	Pļaviņš–Šmēdiņš (Latvia)	1–2	(Germany) Brink–Reckermann	20–22	21–18	11–15

==== Gold medal Match ====
Date		Score		Set 1	Set 2	Set 3
19 Jun	Araújo–Ricardo (Brazil)	0–2	(Brazil) Emanuel–Alison	16–21	15–21	
