= Beach volleyball at the 2012 Summer Olympics – Men's tournament =

Men's beach volleyball at the Games of the XXX Olympiad
- Venue: Horse Guards Parade
- Dates: 28 July – 9 August
- Competitors: 48 from 19 nations

Medalists
1st place, gold medalist(s)		Julius Brink; Jonas Reckermann	Germany
2nd place, silver medalist(s)		Alison Cerutti; Emanuel Rego	Brazil
3rd place, bronze medalist(s)		Mārtiņš Pļaviņš; Jānis Šmēdiņš	Latvia

The men's beach volleyball tournament at the 2012 Olympic Games in London, United Kingdom, took place between 28 July and 9 August at Horse Guards Parade.

Twenty-four pairs were competing, including one from Great Britain as the host country, and a maximum of two from each nation. Sixteen qualified through positioning in the FIVB Beach Volleyball World Rankings as of 17 June 2012, five others earned their places at the 2010–12 Continental Beach Volleyball Cup, and the final three from the FIVB Beach Volleyball World Cup Olympic Qualification tournament.

== Seeds ==
Rank	Team	NOC
1	Alison Cerutti – Emanuel Rego	Brazil
2	Phil Dalhausser – Todd Rogers	United States
3	Julius Brink – Jonas Reckermann	Germany
4	Jake Gibb – Sean Rosenthal	United States
5	Reinder Nummerdor – Richard Schuil	Netherlands
6	John Garcia Thompson – Steve Grotowski	Great Britain
7	Pedro Cunha – Ricardo Santos	Brazil
8	Jonathan Erdmann – Kay Matysik	Germany
9	Grzegorz Fijałek – Mariusz Prudel	Poland
10	Wu Penggen – Xu Linyin	China
11	Adrián Gavira – Pablo Herrera	Spain
12	Jefferson Bellaguarda – Patrick Heuscher	Switzerland
13	Daniele Lupo – Paolo Nicolai	Italy
14	Petr Beneš – Přemysl Kubala	Czech Republic
15	Sébastien Chevallier – Sascha Heyer	Switzerland
16	Aleksandrs Samoilovs – Ruslans Sorokins	Latvia
17	Mārtiņš Pļaviņš – Jānis Šmēdiņš	Latvia
18	Tarjei Skarlund – Martin Spinnangr	Norway
19	Josh Binstock – Martin Reader	Canada
20	Igor Hernández – Jesus Villafañe	Venezuela
21	Freedom Chiya – Grant Goldschmidt	South Africa
22	Sergey Prokopiev – Konstantin Semenov	Russia
23	Kentaro Asahi – Katsuhiro Shiratori	Japan
24	Clemens Doppler – Alexander Horst	Austria

== Preliminary round ==
The composition of the preliminary rounds was announced confirmed on 19 July 2012 in a draw held in Klagenfurt, Austria.

Teams are awarded two points for a win and one for a loss. If two teams are tied at the end of pool play, the tiebreakers is their head-to-head match. If two teams are tied at the end of pool play, the tiebreakers is their head-to-head match. If three or more teams are tied, the tiebreakers are (1) points ratio between tied teams, (2) points ratio within pool, and (3) tournament seed. The two best teams from each group directly advance to the round-of-16. The two best 3rd-placed teams also advance. The remaining four third-placed teams play one another in two Lucky Loser matches, and the two winners complete the list of 16 playoff teams.

- All times are British Summer Time (UTC+01:00).

=== Pool A ===
Pos	Team	Pld	W	L	Pts	SW	SL	SR	SPW	SPL	SPR	Qualification
1	Alison – Emanuel (BRA)	3	3	0	6	6	1	6.000	145	123	1.179	Round of 16
2	Bellaguarda – Heuscher (SUI)	3	1	2	4	2	4	0.500	111	118	0.941	Round of 16
3	Lupo – Nicolai (ITA)	3	1	2	4	2	4	0.500	119	126	0.944	3rd place/Lucky Loser playoffs
4	Doppler – Horst (AUT)	3	1	2	4	3	4	0.750	128	136	0.941	Eliminated

29 July 2012; 11:00	Alison – Emanuel (BRA)	2–1	Doppler – Horst (AUT)	Horse Guards Parade
29 July 2012; 11:00	(19–21, 21–17, 16–14); Report			Horse Guards Parade

29 July 2012; 23:00	Bellaguarda – Heuscher (SUI)	0–2	Lupo – Nicolai (ITA)	Horse Guards Parade
29 July 2012; 23:00	(19–21, 18–21); Report			Horse Guards Parade

31 July 2012; 10:00	Alison – Emanuel (BRA)	2–0	Bellaguarda – Heuscher (SUI)	Horse Guards Parade
31 July 2012; 10:00	(21–17, 21–12); Report			Horse Guards Parade

31 July 2012; 22:00	Lupo – Nicolai (ITA)	0–2	Doppler – Horst (AUT)	Horse Guards Parade
31 July 2012; 22:00	(18–21, 17–21); Report			Horse Guards Parade

2 August 2012; 10:00	Alison – Emanuel (BRA)	2–0	Lupo – Nicolai (ITA)	Horse Guards Parade
2 August 2012; 10:00	(26–24, 21–18); Report			Horse Guards Parade

2 August 2012; 20:00	Bellaguarda – Heuscher (SUI)	2–0	Doppler – Horst (AUT)	Horse Guards Parade
2 August 2012; 20:00	(24–22, 21–12); Report			Horse Guards Parade

=== Pool B ===
Pos	Team	Pld	W	L	Pts	SW	SL	SR	SPW	SPL	SPR	Qualification
1	Dalhausser – Rogers (USA)	3	3	0	6	6	1	6.000	139	109	1.275	Round of 16
2	Gavira – Herrera (ESP)	3	2	1	5	5	2	2.500	139	133	1.045	Round of 16
3	Beneš – Kubala (CZE)	3	1	2	4	2	5	0.400	120	128	0.938	3rd place/Lucky Loser playoffs
4	Asahi – Shiratori (JPN)	3	0	3	3	1	6	0.167	110	138	0.797	Eliminated

29 July 2012; 10:00	Gavira – Herrera (ESP)	2–0	Beneš – Kubala (CZE)	Horse Guards Parade
29 July 2012; 10:00	(25–23, 21–16); Report			Horse Guards Parade

29 July 2012; 22:00	Dalhausser – Rogers (USA)	2–0	Asahi – Shiratori (JPN)	Horse Guards Parade; Referees: Damien Searle(GBR), Richard Casutt(NZL)
29 July 2012; 22:00	(21–15, 21–16); Report			Horse Guards Parade; Referees: Damien Searle(GBR), Richard Casutt(NZL)

31 July 2012; 09:00	Beneš – Kubala (CZE)	2–1	Asahi – Shiratori (JPN)	Horse Guards Parade
31 July 2012; 09:00	(17–21, 21–12, 15–7); Report			Horse Guards Parade

31 July 2012; 21:00	Dalhausser – Rogers (USA)	2–1	Gavira – Herrera (ESP)	Horse Guards Parade
31 July 2012; 21:00	(19–21, 21–16, 15–13); Report			Horse Guards Parade

2 August 2012; 14:30	Gavira – Herrera (ESP)	2–0	Asahi – Shiratori (JPN)	Horse Guards Parade
2 August 2012; 14:30	(21–19, 22–20); Report			Horse Guards Parade

2 August 2012; 21:00	Dalhausser – Rogers (USA)	2–0	Beneš – Kubala (CZE)	Horse Guards Parade
2 August 2012; 21:00	(21–13, 21–15); Report			Horse Guards Parade

=== Pool C ===
Pos	Team	Pld	W	L	Pts	SW	SL	SR	SPW	SPL	SPR	Qualification
1	Brink – Reckermann (GER)	3	3	0	6	6	1	6.000	133	114	1.167	Round of 16
2	Chevallier – Heyer (SUI)	3	2	1	5	4	4	1.000	145	151	0.960	Round of 16
3	Prokopiev – Semenov (RUS)	3	1	2	4	3	5	0.600	157	163	0.963	Round of 16
4	Wu – Xu (CHN)	3	0	3	3	3	6	0.500	157	164	0.957	Eliminated

28 July 2012; 12:00	Brink – Reckermann (GER)	2–0	Prokopiev – Semenov (RUS)	Horse Guards Parade
28 July 2012; 12:00	(21–19, 21–17); Report			Horse Guards Parade

28 July 2012; 14:30	Wu – Xu (CHN)	1–2	Chevallier – Heyer (SUI)	Horse Guards Parade
28 July 2012; 14:30	(21–18, 16–21, 12–15); Report			Horse Guards Parade

30 July 2012; 14:30	Brink – Reckermann (GER)	2–1	Wu – Xu (CHN)	Horse Guards Parade
30 July 2012; 14:30	(13–21, 21–19, 15–8); Report			Horse Guards Parade

30 July 2012; 20:00	Chevallier – Heyer (SUI)	2–1	Prokopiev – Semenov (RUS)	Horse Guards Parade
30 July 2012; 20:00	(28–26, 18–21, 15–13); Report			Horse Guards Parade

1 August 2012; 11:00	Wu – Xu (CHN)	1–2	Prokopiev – Semenov (RUS)	Horse Guards Parade
1 August 2012; 11:00	(27–29, 21–17, 12–15); Report			Horse Guards Parade

1 August 2012; 21:00	Brink – Reckermann (GER)	2–0	Chevallier – Heyer (SUI)	Horse Guards Parade
1 August 2012; 21:00	(21–14, 21–16); Report			Horse Guards Parade

=== Pool D ===
Pos	Team	Pld	W	L	Pts	SW	SL	SR	SPW	SPL	SPR	Qualification
1	Gibb – Rosenthal (USA)	3	2	1	5	4	2	2.000	119	89	1.337	Round of 16
2	Fijałek – Prudel (POL)	3	2	1	5	5	2	2.500	132	115	1.148	Round of 16
3	Samoilovs – Sorokins (LAT)	3	2	1	5	4	3	1.333	116	113	1.027	Round of 16
4	Chiya – Goldschmidt (RSA)	3	0	3	3	0	6	0.000	76	126	0.603	Eliminated

28 July 2012; 11:00	Fijałek – Prudel (POL)	1–2	Samoilovs – Sorokins (LAT)	Horse Guards Parade
28 July 2012; 11:00	(21–12, 15–21, 12–15); Report			Horse Guards Parade

28 July 2012; 22:00	Gibb – Rosenthal (USA)	2–0	Chiya – Goldschmidt (RSA)	Horse Guards Parade
28 July 2012; 22:00	(21–10, 21–11); Report			Horse Guards Parade

30 July 2012; 12:00	Samoilovs – Sorokins (LAT)	2–0	Chiya – Goldschmidt (RSA)	Horse Guards Parade
30 July 2012; 12:00	(21–13, 21–10); Report			Horse Guards Parade

30 July 2012; 21:00	Gibb – Rosenthal (USA)	0–2	Fijałek – Prudel (POL)	Horse Guards Parade
30 July 2012; 21:00	(17–21, 18–21); Report			Horse Guards Parade

1 August 2012; 12:00	Fijałek – Prudel (POL)	2–0	Chiya – Goldschmidt (RSA)	Horse Guards Parade
1 August 2012; 12:00	(21–19, 21–13); Report			Horse Guards Parade

1 August 2012; 16:30	Gibb – Rosenthal (USA)	2–0	Samoilovs – Sorokins (LAT)	Horse Guards Parade
1 August 2012; 16:30	(21–10, 21–16); Report			Horse Guards Parade

=== Pool E ===
Pos	Team	Pld	W	L	Pts	SW	SL	SR	SPW	SPL	SPR	Qualification
1	Pļaviņš – Šmēdiņš (LAT)	3	3	0	6	6	1	6.000	141	113	1.248	Round of 16
2	Nummerdor – Schuil (NED)	3	2	1	5	4	3	1.333	127	116	1.095	Round of 16
3	Erdmann – Matysik (GER)	3	1	2	4	3	5	0.600	132	148	0.892	3rd place/Lucky Loser playoffs
4	Hernández – Villafañe (VEN)	3	0	3	3	2	6	0.333	128	151	0.848	Eliminated

29 July 2012; 14:30	Nummerdor – Schuil (NED)	2–1	Hernández – Villafañe (VEN)	Horse Guards Parade
29 July 2012; 14:30	(21–18, 17–21, 15–10); Report			Horse Guards Parade

29 July 2012; 15:30	Erdmann – Matysik (GER)	1–2	Pļaviņš – Šmēdiņš (LAT)	Horse Guards Parade
29 July 2012; 15:30	(21–19, 21–23, 9–15); Report			Horse Guards Parade

31 July 2012; 14:30	Pļaviņš – Šmēdiņš (LAT)	2–0	Hernández – Villafañe (VEN)	Horse Guards Parade
31 July 2012; 14:30	(21–14, 21–16); Report			Horse Guards Parade

31 July 2012; 15:30	Nummerdor – Schuil (NED)	2–0	Erdmann – Matysik (GER)	Horse Guards Parade
31 July 2012; 15:30	(21–9, 21–16); Report			Horse Guards Parade

2 August 2012; 09:00	Nummerdor – Schuil (NED)	0–2	Pļaviņš – Šmēdiņš (LAT)	Horse Guards Parade
2 August 2012; 09:00	(14–21, 18–21); Report			Horse Guards Parade

2 August 2012; 15:30	Erdmann – Matysik (GER)	2–1	Hernández – Villafañe (VEN)	Horse Guards Parade
2 August 2012; 15:30	(20–22, 21–16, 15–11); Report			Horse Guards Parade

=== Pool F ===
Pos	Team	Pld	W	L	Pts	SW	SL	SR	SPW	SPL	SPR	Qualification
1	Ricardo – Cunha (BRA)	3	3	0	6	6	0	MAX	129	101	1.277	Round of 16
2	Skarlund – Spinnangr (NOR)	3	2	1	5	4	2	2.000	117	107	1.093	Round of 16
3	Binstock – Reader (CAN)	3	1	2	4	2	4	0.500	114	119	0.958	3rd place/Lucky Loser playoffs
4	Garcia Thompson – Grotowski (GBR)	3	0	3	3	0	6	0.000	94	127	0.740	Eliminated

28 July 2012; 16:30	Garcia Thompson – Grotowski (GBR)	0–2	Binstock – Reader (CAN)	Horse Guards Parade
28 July 2012; 16:30	(19–21, 13–21); Report			Horse Guards Parade

28 July 2012; 20:00	Ricardo – Cunha (BRA)	2–0	Skarlund – Spinnangr (NOR)	Horse Guards Parade
28 July 2012; 20:00	(21–14, 21–18); Report			Horse Guards Parade

30 July 2012; 11:00	Skarlund – Spinnangr (NOR)	2–0	Binstock – Reader (CAN)	Horse Guards Parade
30 July 2012; 11:00	(21–14, 21–18); Report			Horse Guards Parade

30 July 2012; 17:30	Garcia Thompson – Grotowski (GBR)	0–2	Ricardo – Cunha (BRA)	Horse Guards Parade
30 July 2012; 17:30	(17–21, 12–21); Report			Horse Guards Parade

1 August 2012; 17:30	Garcia Thompson – Grotowski (GBR)	0–2	Skarlund – Spinnangr (NOR)	Horse Guards Parade
1 August 2012; 17:30	(20–22, 13–21); Report			Horse Guards Parade

1 August 2012; 20:00	Ricardo – Cunha (BRA)	2–0	Binstock – Reader (CAN)	Horse Guards Parade
1 August 2012; 20:00	(21–18, 24–22); Report			Horse Guards Parade

=== Lucky loser ===
Of the 6 teams that are placed third in their pools, two directly qualify for the playoffs. From the four remaining third placed teams, another two teams qualify for the playoffs by winning a Lucky Loser match.

This table shows the results of the third placed teams after the pool play, and before the Lucky Loser matches.

Pos	Team	Pld	W	L	Pts	SW	SL	SR	SPW	SPL	SPR	Qualification
1	Samoilovs – Sorokins (LAT)	3	2	1	5	4	3	1.333	116	113	1.027	Round of 16
2	Prokopiev – Semenov (RUS)	3	1	2	4	3	5	0.600	157	163	0.963	Round of 16
3	Erdmann – Matysik (GER)	3	1	2	4	3	5	0.600	132	148	0.892	Lucky loser play-offs
4	Binstock – Reader (CAN)	3	1	2	4	2	4	0.500	114	119	0.958	Lucky loser play-offs
5	Lupo – Nicolai (ITA)	3	1	2	4	2	4	0.500	119	126	0.944	Lucky loser play-offs
6	Beneš – Kubala (CZE)	3	1	2	4	2	5	0.400	120	128	0.938	Lucky loser play-offs

==== Lucky loser play-offs ====
2 August 2012; 23:00	Binstock – Reader (CAN)	0–2	Lupo – Nicolai (ITA)	Horse Guards Parade
2 August 2012; 23:00	(16–21, 20–22); Report			Horse Guards Parade

2 August 2012; 23:00	Erdmann – Matysik (GER)	2–1	Beneš – Kubala (CZE)	Horse Guards Parade
2 August 2012; 23:00	(15–21, 21–19, 15–13); Report			Horse Guards Parade

== Playoffs ==
=== Round of 16 ===
3 August 2012; 10:00	Fijałek – Prudel (POL)	2–0	Chevallier – Heyer (SUI)	Horse Guards Parade
3 August 2012; 10:00	(21–18, 21–17); Report			Horse Guards Parade

3 August 2012; 13:00	Pļaviņš – Šmēdiņš (LAT)	2–0	Skarlund – Spinnangr (NOR)	Horse Guards Parade
3 August 2012; 13:00	(21–18, 21–16); Report			Horse Guards Parade

3 August 2012; 18:00	Lupo – Nicolai (ITA)	2–0	Dalhausser – Rogers (USA)	Horse Guards Parade
3 August 2012; 18:00	(21–17, 21–19); Report			Horse Guards Parade

3 August 2012; 21:00	Gavira – Herrera (ESP)	0–2	Ricardo – Cunha (BRA)	Horse Guards Parade
3 August 2012; 21:00	(18–21, 19–21); Report			Horse Guards Parade

4 August 2012; 10:00	Alison – Emanuel (BRA)	2–0	Erdmann – Matysik (GER)	Horse Guards Parade
4 August 2012; 10:00	(21–16, 21–14); Report			Horse Guards Parade

4 August 2012; 14:00	Nummerdor – Schuil (NED)	2–0	Bellaguarda – Heuscher (SUI)	Horse Guards Parade
4 August 2012; 14:00	(22–20, 21–15); Report			Horse Guards Parade

4 August 2012; 17:00	Brink – Reckermann (GER)	2–0	Samoilovs – Sorokins (LAT)	Horse Guards Parade
4 August 2012; 17:00	(21–12, 21–17); Report			Horse Guards Parade

4 August 2012; 22:00	Prokopiev – Semenov (RUS)	0–2	Gibb – Rosenthal (USA)	Horse Guards Parade
4 August 2012; 22:00	(14–21, 20–22); Report			Horse Guards Parade

=== Finals overview ===
Quarter-finals
1	Alison – Emanuel (BRA)	21	16	17
9	Fijałek – Prudel (POL)	17	21	15
17	Pļaviņš – Šmēdiņš (LAT)	19	21	15
4	Gibb – Rosenthal (USA)	21	18	11
3	Brink – Reckermann (GER)	21	21
7	Ricardo – Cunha (BRA)	15	19
5	Nummerdor – Schuil (NED)	21	21
13	Lupo – Nicolai (ITA)	16	18

Semi-finals
1	Alison – Emanuel (BRA)	21	22
17	Pļaviņš – Šmēdiņš (LAT)	15	20
3	Brink – Reckermann (GER)	21	21
5	Nummerdor – Schuil (NED)	14	16

Final
1	Alison – Emanuel (BRA)	21	21	14
3	Brink – Reckermann (GER)	23	16	16
Bronze medal match
17	Pļaviņš – Šmēdiņš (LAT)	19	21	15
5	Nummerdor – Schuil (NED)	21	19	11

=== Quarter-finals ===
6 August 2012; 18:00	Alison – Emanuel (BRA)	2–1	Fijałek – Prudel (POL)	Horse Guards Parade
6 August 2012; 18:00	(21–17, 16–21, 17–15); Report			Horse Guards Parade

6 August 2012; 19:00	Pļaviņš – Šmēdiņš (LAT)	2–1	Gibb – Rosenthal (USA)	Horse Guards Parade
6 August 2012; 19:00	(19–21, 21–18, 15–11); Report			Horse Guards Parade

6 August 2012; 22:00	Brink – Reckermann (GER)	2–0	Ricardo – Cunha (BRA)	Horse Guards Parade
6 August 2012; 22:00	(21–15, 21–19); Report			Horse Guards Parade

6 August 2012; 23:00	Nummerdor – Schuil (NED)	2–0	Lupo – Nicolai (ITA)	Horse Guards Parade
6 August 2012; 23:00	(21–16, 21–18); Report			Horse Guards Parade

=== Semi-finals ===
7 August 2012; 17:00	Alison – Emanuel (BRA)	2–0	Pļaviņš – Šmēdiņš (LAT)	Horse Guards Parade
7 August 2012; 17:00	(21–15, 22–20); Report			Horse Guards Parade

7 August 2012; 23:00	Brink – Reckermann (GER)	2–0	Nummerdor – Schuil (NED)	Horse Guards Parade
7 August 2012; 23:00	(21–14, 21–16); Report			Horse Guards Parade

=== Bronze medal match ===
9 August 2012; 19:00	Pļaviņš – Šmēdiņš (LAT)	2–1	Nummerdor – Schuil (NED)	Horse Guards Parade
9 August 2012; 19:00	(19–21, 21–19, 15–11); Report			Horse Guards Parade

=== Final ===
9 August 2012; 21:00	Alison – Emanuel (BRA)	1–2	Brink – Reckermann (GER)	Horse Guards Parade
9 August 2012; 21:00	(21–23, 21–16, 14–16); Report			Horse Guards Parade

== Final ranking ==
Rank	Team	Seed
1st place, gold medalist(s)	Julius Brink – Jonas Reckermann (GER)	3
2nd place, silver medalist(s)	Alison Cerutti – Emanuel Rego (BRA)	1
3rd place, bronze medalist(s)	Mārtiņš Pļaviņš – Jānis Šmēdiņš (LAT)	17
4.	Reinder Nummerdor – Richard Schuil (NED)	5
5.	Jake Gibb – Sean Rosenthal (USA)	4
5.	Ricardo Santos – Pedro Cunha (BRA)	7
5.	Grzegorz Fijałek – Mariusz Prudel (POL)	9
5.	Daniele Lupo – Paolo Nicolai (ITA)	13
9.	Phil Dalhausser – Todd Rogers (USA)	2
9.	Jonathan Erdmann – Kay Matysik (GER)	8
9.	Adrián Gavira – Pablo Herrera (ESP)	11
9.	Jefferson Bellaguarda – Patrick Heuscher (SUI)	12
9.	Sébastien Chevallier – Sascha Heyer (SUI)	15
9.	Aleksandrs Samoilovs – Ruslans Sorokins (LAT)	16
9.	Tarjei Skarlund – Martin Spinnangr (NOR)	18
9.	Sergey Prokopiev – Konstantin Semenov (RUS)	22
17.	Petr Beneš – Přemysl Kubala (CZE)	14
17.	Josh Binstock – Martin Reader (CAN)	19
19.	John Garcia Thompson – Steve Grotowski (GBR)	6
19.	Wu Penggen – Xu Linyin (CHN)	10
19.	Igor Hernández – Jesus Villafañe (VEN)	20
19.	Freedom Chiya – Grant Goldschmidt (RSA)	21
19.	Kentaro Asahi – Katsuhiro Shiratori (JPN)	23
19.	Clemens Doppler – Alexander Horst (AUT)	24

== See also ==
- Beach volleyball at the 2012 Summer Olympics – Women's tournament
