= 2014 in volleyball =

The following were the events of Volleyball for the year 2014 throughout the world.

== Beach volleyball ==
- April 22 – December 14: 2014 FIVB Beach Volleyball World Tour
  - April 22 – December 14: Open Tournaments
    - April 22 – 27 in (China) Fuzhou
      - Winners: (Italy) Paolo Nicolai & Daniele Lupo (m) / (United States) Kerri Walsh Jennings & April Ross (f)
    - May 6 – 11 in (Mexico) Puerto Vallarta
      - Winners: (Latvia) Aleksandrs Samoilovs & Jānis Šmēdiņš (m) / (Brazil) Agatha Bednarczuk & Bárbara Seixas (f)
    - May 21 – 25 in (Czech Republic) Prague (women teams only)
      - Winners: (Czech Republic) Kristýna Kolocová & Markéta Sluková
    - May 27 – June 1 in (Russia) Anapa
      - Winners: (Latvia) Mārtiņš Pļaviņš & Aleksandrs Solovejs (m) / (Germany) Victoria Bieneck & Julia Großner (f)
    - October 7 – 12 in (China) Xiamen
      - Winners: (France) Youssef Krou & Edouard Rowlandson (m) / (Brazil) Juliana Silva & Maria Antonelli (f)
    - October 28 – November 2 in (Argentina) Paraná
      - Winners: (Canada) Josh Binstock & Sam Schachter (m) / (Brazil) Larissa França & Talita Antunes (f)
    - November 4 – 8 in (Qatar) Doha (men only)
      - Winners: (Germany) Tim Holler & Jonas Schröder
    - November 5 – 9 in (Thailand) Pattaya (women only)
      - Winners: (Vanuatu) Miller Elwin & Linline Matauatu
    - December 9 – 14 in (South Africa) Bloemfontein (final)
      - Winners: (Netherlands) Reinder Nummerdor & Christiaan Varenhorst (m) / (Czech Republic) Martina Bonnerová & Barbora Hermannová (f)
  - April 29 – September 28: Grand Slam Tournaments
    - April 29 – May 4 in (China) Shanghai
      - Winners: (Italy) Paolo Nicolai & Daniele Lupo (m) / (Germany) Laura Ludwig & Kira Walkenhorst (f)
    - June 11 – 15 in (Russia) Moscow
      - Winners: (Russia) Konstantin Semenov & Viacheslav Krasilnikov (m) / (United States) April Ross & Kerri Walsh (f)
    - June 17 – 22 in (Germany) Berlin
      - Winners: (United States) John Hyden & Tri Bourne (m) / (Czech Republic) Kristýna Kolocová & Markéta Sluková (f)
    - June 24 – 29 in (Norway) Stavanger
      - Winners: (United States) Phil Dalhausser & Sean Rosenthal (m) / (United States) April Ross & Kerri Walsh (f)
    - July 8 – 13 in (Switzerland) Gstaad
      - Winners: (United States) Phil Dalhausser & Sean Rosenthal (m) / (Germany) Katrin Holtwick & Ilka Semmler (f)
    - July 15 – 20 in (Netherlands) The Hague
      - Winners: (Poland) Grzegorz Fijałek & Mariusz Prudel (m) / (Brazil) Taiana Lima & Fernanda Alves (f)
    - July 22 – 27 in (United States) Long Beach, California
      - Winners: (United States) Phil Dalhausser & Sean Rosenthal (m) / (United States) April Ross & Kerri Walsh (f)
    - July 29 – August 3 in (Austria) Klagenfurt
      - Winners: (Brazil) Alison Cerutti & Bruno Oscar Schmidt (m) / (Brazil) Larissa França & Talita Antunes (f)
    - August 19 – 24 in (Poland) Stare Jabłonki
      - Winners: (Brazil) Pedro Solberg Salgado & Álvaro Morais Filho (m) / (Brazil) Larissa França & Talita Antunes (f)
    - September 23 – 28 in (Brazil) São Paulo (final)
      - Winners: (Netherlands) Christiaan Varenhorst & Reinder Nummerdor (m) / (Brazil) Larissa França & Talita Antunes (f)
- June 3 – 8: 2014 European Beach Volleyball Championships in (Italy) Cagliari
  - Men's winners: (Italy) Paolo Nicolai and Daniele Lupo
  - Women's winners: (Netherlands) Madelein Meppelink and Marleen van Iersel
- June 5 – 8: 2014 Asian Beach Volleyball Championship in (China) Jinjiang
  - Men's winners: (Australia) Isaac Kapa and Christopher McHugh
  - Women's winners: (Australia) Louise Bawden and Taliqua Clancy
- June 10 – 15: 2014 FIVB U23 World Championships in (Poland) Masłowice
  - Winners: (Poland) Maciej Kosiak & Maciej Rudol (m) / (Australia) Nicole Laird & Mariafe Artacho (f)
- July 15 – 20: 2014 FIVB U17 World Championships in (Mexico) Acapulco
  - Winners: (Switzerland) Yves Haussener & Florian Breer (m) / (United States) Morgan Martin & Kathryn Plummer (f)
- July 23 – 27: 2014 FIVB U21 World Championships in (Cyprus) Larnaca
  - Winners: (Poland) Michal Bryl & Kacper Kujawiak (m) / (Canada) Sophie Bukovec & Tiadora Miric (f)
- July 29 – August 3: 2014 FIVB U19 World Championships in (Portugal) Porto
  - Winners: (Brazil) Arthur Diego Mariano Lanci & George Souto Maior Wanderley (m) / (Brazil) Eduarda Santos Lisboa & Andressa Cavalcanti Ramalho (f)
- August 17 – 27: 2014 Summer Youth Olympics
  - Boys: (gold) (Russia) Oleg Stoyanovskiy / Artem Iarzutkin; (silver) (Venezuela) Rolando Hernandez / Jose Gregorio Gomez; (bronze) (Argentina) Leandro Nicolas Aveiro / Santiago Karim Aulisi
  - Girls: (gold) (Brazil) Eduarda Santos Lisboa / Ana Patricia Silva Ramos; (silver) (Canada) Megan and Nicole McNamara; (bronze) (Germany) Sarah Schneider / Lisa Arnholdt

== Volleyball ==
- January 3 – October 25: 2014 FIVB Volleyball Schedule
- October 22, 2013 – March 16, 2014: 2013–14 CEV Women's Champions League
  - (Russia) Dinamo Kazan defeated (Turkey) VakıfBank İstanbul 3–0, to claim its first title. The bronze medal went to (Azerbaijan) Rabita Baku.
- October 22, 2013 – March 23, 2014: 2013–14 CEV Champions League
  - (Russia) Belogorie Belgorod defeated (Turkey) Halkbank Ankara 3–1. (Poland) Jastrzębski Węgiel took third place.
- May 5 – 10: 2014 FIVB Volleyball Men's Club World Championship in (Brazil) Belo Horizonte
  - (Russia) Belogorie Belgorod defeated (Qatar) Al-Rayyan, 3–1, to claim its first title. (Argentina) UPCN San Juan took third place.
- May 7 – 11: 2014 FIVB Volleyball Women's Club World Championship in (Switzerland) Zürich
  - (Russia) Dinamo Kazan defeated (Brazil) Molico Osasco, 3–0, to claim its first title.
- May 23 – July 20: 2014 FIVB Volleyball World League for Men in Italy
  - United States defeated Brazil, 3–1 (in matches won), to claim its second FIVB World League title. Italy took third place.
- July 25 – August 24: 2014 FIVB World Grand Prix for Women
  - August 15 & 16: Group 2 Finals in (Poland) Koszalin
    - Belgium defeated the Netherlands, 3–2 in matches won, in this group final. Puerto Rico took third place.
  - August 16 & 17: Group 3 Finals in Samokov
    - Bulgaria defeated the Czech Republic, 3–0 in matches won, in this group final. Croatia took third place.
  - August 20 – 24: Main Group 1 Finals in Tokyo
    - Brazil took first place (13 points) and won its tenth World Grand Prix title. Host nation, Japan, took second place (12 points). Russia took third place (7 points and higher points ratio).
- August 30 – September 21: 2014 FIVB Volleyball Men's World Championship in Poland
  - Host nation, Poland, defeated Brazil, 3–1 in matches, to claim its second FIVB Men's World Championship title. Germany took the bronze medal.
- September 23 – October 12: 2014 FIVB Women's Volleyball World Championship in Italy
  - The United States defeated China, 3–1 in matches, to claim its first FIVB Women's World Championship title. Brazil won the bronze medal.

== Volleyball Hall of Fame ==
- Class of 2014:
  - Nalbert Bitencourt
  - Tara Cross-Battle
  - Sandra Pires
  - Rosa Salikhova
  - Joop Alberda
