= Beach volleyball at the 2015 European Games – Men's tournament =

Men's beach volleyball at the 2015 European Games
- Venue: Beach Arena
- Date: 17–21 June
- Competitors: 64 from 22 nations
- Teams: 32

Medalists
gold medal	Mārtiņš Pļaviņš; Haralds Regža	Latvia
silver medal	Dmitri Barsuk; Yaroslav Koshkarev	Russia
bronze medal	Přemysl Kubala; Jan Hadrava	Czech Republic

The men's tournament in beach volleyball at the 2015 European Games in Baku, Azerbaijan was the first edition of the event in a European Games. It was held at the Beach Arena from 17 to 21 June 2015.

== Preliminary round ==
=== Pool A ===
Pos	Team	Pld	W	L	Pts	SW	SL	SR	SPW	SPL	SPR	Qualification
1	Ranghieri – Rossi (ITA)	3	3	0	6	6	0	MAX	127	88	1.443	Round of 16
2	Hordvik – Kvamsdal (NOR)	3	2	1	5	4	3	1.333	132	127	1.039	Round of 24
3	Romano – Gritsai (AZE)	3	1	2	4	3	4	0.750	118	130	0.908	Round of 24
4	Rumševičius – Každailis (LTU)	3	0	3	3	0	6	0.000	96	128	0.750	

Date	Time		Score		Set 1	Set 2	Set 3	Total	Report
17 Jun	13:00	Romano – Gritsai (AZE)	2–0	Rumševičius – Každailis (LTU)	21–14	21–19		42–33	Report
17 Jun	13:00	Ranghieri – Rossi (ITA)	2–0	Hordvik – Kvamsdal (NOR)	21–17	21–17		42–34	Report
18 Jun	18:00	Ranghieri – Rossi (ITA)	2–0	Rumševičius – Každailis (LTU)	21–10	22–20		43–30	Report
18 Jun	18:00	Romano – Gritsai (AZE)	1–2	Hordvik – Kvamsdal (NOR)	19–21	21–19	12–15	52–55	Report
19 Jun	13:00	Romano – Gritsai (AZE)	0–2	Ranghieri – Rossi (ITA)	15–21	9–21		24–42	Report
19 Jun	13:00	Hordvik – Kvamsdal (NOR)	2–0	Rumševičius – Každailis (LTU)	22–20	21–13		43–33	Report

=== Pool B ===
Pos	Team	Pld	W	L	Pts	SW	SL	SR	SPW	SPL	SPR	Qualification
1	Kissling – Strasser (SUI)	3	2	1	5	4	2	2.000	112	106	1.057	Round of 16
2	Kosiak – Rudoł (POL)	3	2	1	5	4	3	1.333	129	115	1.122	Round of 24
3	Denin – Plotnytskyi (UKR)	3	1	2	4	2	5	0.400	110	135	0.815	Round of 24
4	Tomás – Menéndez (ESP)	3	1	2	4	4	4	1.000	142	137	1.036	

Date	Time		Score		Set 1	Set 2	Set 3	Total	Report
17 Jun	11:00	Kosiak – Rudoł (POL)	2–0	Denin – Plotnytskyi (UKR)	21–12	21–12		42–24	Report
17 Jun	11:00	Tomás – Menéndez (ESP)	2–0	Kissling – Strasser (SUI)	21–12	21–16		42–28	Report
18 Jun	11:00	Kosiak – Rudoł (POL)	0–2	Kissling – Strasser (SUI)	18–21	15–21		33–42	Report
18 Jun	11:00	Tomás – Menéndez (ESP)	1–2	Denin – Plotnytskyi (UKR)	21–18	16–21	14–16	51–55	Report
19 Jun	11:00	Kosiak – Rudoł (POL)	2–1	Tomás – Menéndez (ESP)	18–21	21–15	15–13	54–49	Report
19 Jun	11:00	Kissling – Strasser (SUI)	2–0	Denin – Plotnytskyi (UKR)	21–16	21–15		42–31	Report

=== Pool C ===
Pos	Team	Pld	W	L	Pts	SW	SL	SR	SPW	SPL	SPR	Qualification
1	P. Ingrosso – M. Ingrosso (ITA)	3	3	0	6	6	0	MAX	126	95	1.326	Round of 16
2	Kotsilianos – Zoupanis (GRE)	3	2	1	5	4	3	1.333	124	124	1.000	Round of 24
3	Solovejs – Sorokins (LAT)	3	1	2	4	2	5	0.400	121	132	0.917	Round of 24
4	Gordieiev – Iemelianchyk (UKR)	3	0	3	3	2	6	0.333	130	150	0.867	

Date	Time		Score		Set 1	Set 2	Set 3	Total	Report
17 Jun	10:00	P. Ingrosso – M. Ingrosso (ITA)	2–0	Gordieiev – Iemelianchyk (UKR)	21–19	21–15		42–34	Report
17 Jun	10:00	Kotsilianos – Zoupanis (GRE)	2–0	Solovejs – Sorokins (LAT)	21–18	21–16		42–34	Report
18 Jun	10:00	P. Ingrosso – M. Ingrosso (ITA)	2–0	Solovejs – Sorokins (LAT)	21–17	21–16		42–33	Report
18 Jun	10:00	Kotsilianos – Zoupanis (GRE)	2–1	Gordieiev – Iemelianchyk (UKR)	17–21	22–20	15–7	54–48	Report
19 Jun	10:00	P. Ingrosso – M. Ingrosso (ITA)	2–0	Kotsilianos – Zoupanis (GRE)	21–15	21–13		42–28	Report
19 Jun	10:00	Solovejs – Sorokins (LAT)	2–1	Gordieiev – Iemelianchyk (UKR)	21–15	18–21	15–12	54–48	Report

=== Pool D ===
Pos	Team	Pld	W	L	Pts	SW	SL	SR	SPW	SPL	SPR	Qualification
1	Pļaviņš – Regža (LAT)	3	3	0	6	6	3	2.000	169	158	1.070	Round of 16
2	Kavalenka – Dziadkou (BLR)	3	2	1	5	5	4	1.250	165	163	1.012	Round of 24
3	Eglseer – Müllner (AUT)	3	1	2	4	4	5	0.800	165	164	1.006	Round of 24
4	Nurminen – Piippo (FIN)	3	0	3	3	3	6	0.500	143	157	0.911	

Date	Time		Score		Set 1	Set 2	Set 3	Total	Report
17 Jun	11:00	Pļaviņš – Regža (LAT)	2–1	Nurminen – Piippo (FIN)	19–21	22–20	15–10	56–51	Report
17 Jun	11:00	Eglseer – Müllner (AUT)	1–2	Kavalenka – Dziadkou (BLR)	24–22	23–25	13–15	60–62	Report
18 Jun	11:00	Pļaviņš – Regža (LAT)	2–1	Kavalenka – Dziadkou (BLR)	24–22	17–21	15–11	56–54	Report
18 Jun	11:00	Eglseer – Müllner (AUT)	2–1	Nurminen – Piippo (FIN)	16–21	21–15	15–9	52–45	Report
19 Jun	11:00	Pļaviņš – Regža (LAT)	2–1	Eglseer – Müllner (AUT)	21–19	21–23	15–11	57–53	Report
19 Jun	11:00	Kavalenka – Dziadkou (BLR)	2–1	Nurminen – Piippo (FIN)	21–13	13–21	15–13	49–47	Report

=== Pool E ===
Pos	Team	Pld	W	L	Pts	SW	SL	SR	SPW	SPL	SPR	Qualification
1	Faiga – Hilman (ISR)	3	3	0	6	6	1	6.000	141	122	1.156	Round of 16
2	Kubala – Hadrava (CZE)	3	2	1	5	5	2	2.500	135	121	1.116	Round of 24
3	Şekerci – Mermer (TUR)	3	1	2	4	2	5	0.400	117	136	0.860	Round of 24
4	Van de Velde – Van Dorsten (NED)	3	0	3	3	1	6	0.167	121	135	0.896	

Date	Time		Score		Set 1	Set 2	Set 3	Total	Report
17 Jun	10:00	Van de Velde – Van Dorsten (NED)	0–2	Kubala – Hadrava (CZE)	18–21	19–21		37–42	Report
17 Jun	10:00	Şekerci – Mermer (TUR)	0–2	Faiga – Hilman (ISR)	18–21	20–22		38–43	Report
18 Jun	10:00	Van de Velde – Van Dorsten (NED)	0–2	Faiga – Hilman (ISR)	17–21	16–21		33–42	Report
18 Jun	10:00	Şekerci – Mermer (TUR)	0–2	Kubala – Hadrava (CZE)	15–21	13–21		28–42	Report
19 Jun	10:00	Van de Velde – Van Dorsten (NED)	1–2	Şekerci – Mermer (TUR)	21–15	17–21	13–15	51–51	Report
19 Jun	10:00	Faiga – Hilman (ISR)	2–1	Kubala – Hadrava (CZE)	21–19	20–22	15–10	56–51	Report

=== Pool F ===
Pos	Team	Pld	W	L	Pts	SW	SL	SR	SPW	SPL	SPR	Qualification
1	Kildegaard – Abell (DEN)	3	2	1	5	4	3	1.333	130	113	1.150	Round of 16
2	Barsuk – Koshkarev (RUS)	3	2	1	5	4	2	2.000	119	100	1.190	Round of 24
3	Salvetti – Daguerre (FRA)	3	2	1	5	5	2	2.500	127	120	1.058	Round of 24
4	Özbek – Göğtepe (TUR)	3	0	3	3	0	6	0.000	83	126	0.659	

Date	Time		Score		Set 1	Set 2	Set 3	Total	Report
17 Jun	13:00	Barsuk – Koshkarev (RUS)	2–0	Özbek – Göğtepe (TUR)	21–10	21–13		42–23	Report
17 Jun	13:00	Salvetti – Daguerre (FRA)	1–2	Kildegaard – Abell (DEN)	21–18	11–21	10–15	42–54	Report
18 Jun	18:00	Barsuk – Koshkarev (RUS)	2–0	Kildegaard – Abell (DEN)	21–18	21–16		42–34	Report
18 Jun	18:00	Salvetti – Daguerre (FRA)	2–0	Özbek – Göğtepe (TUR)	21–13	21–18		42–31	Report
19 Jun	13:00	Barsuk – Koshkarev (RUS)	0–2	Salvetti – Daguerre (FRA)	15–21	20–22		35–43	Report
19 Jun	13:00	Kildegaard – Abell (DEN)	2–0	Özbek – Göğtepe (TUR)	21–17	21–12		42–29	Report

=== Pool G ===
Pos	Team	Pld	W	L	Pts	SW	SL	SR	SPW	SPL	SPR	Qualification
1	Winter – Petutsching (AUT)	3	3	0	6	6	0	MAX	126	98	1.286	Round of 16
2	Kollo – Vesik (EST)	3	2	1	5	4	3	1.333	128	132	0.970	Round of 24
3	Marco – García (ESP)	3	1	2	4	3	4	0.750	136	132	1.030	Round of 24
4	Sheaf – Gregory (GBR)	3	0	3	3	0	6	0.000	100	128	0.781	

Date	Time		Score		Set 1	Set 2	Set 3	Total	Report
17 Jun	12:00	Marco – García (ESP)	1–2	Kollo – Vesik (EST)	18–21	21–15	17–19	56–55	Report
17 Jun	12:00	Winter – Petutsching (AUT)	2–0	Sheaf – Gregory (GBR)	21–19	21–12		42–31	Report
18 Jun	17:00	Marco – García (ESP)	2–0	Sheaf – Gregory (GBR)	23–21	21–14		44–35	Report
18 Jun	17:00	Winter – Petutsching (AUT)	2–0	Kollo – Vesik (EST)	21–15	21–16		42–31	Report
19 Jun	12:00	Marco – García (ESP)	0–2	Winter – Petutsching (AUT)	18–21	18–21		36–42	Report
19 Jun	12:00	Sheaf – Gregory (GBR)	0–2	Kollo – Vesik (EST)	19–21	15–21		34–42	Report

=== Pool H ===
Pos	Team	Pld	W	L	Pts	SW	SL	SR	SPW	SPL	SPR	Qualification
1	Chevallier – Krattiger (SUI)	3	3	0	6	6	2	3.000	147	132	1.114	Round of 16
2	Santos – Rudykh (AZE)	3	1	2	4	2	5	0.400	130	133	0.977	Round of 24
3	Kufa – Dumek (CZE)	3	1	2	4	4	4	1.000	144	146	0.986	Round of 24
4	Thiercy – Di Giantomasso (FRA)	3	1	2	4	4	5	0.800	154	164	0.939	

Date	Time		Score		Set 1	Set 2	Set 3	Total	Report
17 Jun	12:00	Santos – Rudykh (AZE)	0–2	Kufa – Dumek (CZE)	20–22	19–21		39–43	Report
17 Jun	12:00	Chevallier – Krattiger (SUI)	2–1	Thiercy – Di Giantomasso (FRA)	18–21	21–17	15–12	54–50	Report
18 Jun	18:00	Chevallier – Krattiger (SUI)	2–1	Kufa – Dumek (CZE)	21–19	15–21	15–10	51–50	Report
18 Jun	19:00	Santos – Rudykh (AZE)	2–1	Thiercy – Di Giantomasso (FRA)	23–25	21–13	15–10	59–48	Report
19 Jun	12:00	Santos – Rudykh (AZE)	0–2	Chevallier – Krattiger (SUI)	19–21	13–21		32–42	Report
19 Jun	12:00	Thiercy – Di Giantomasso (FRA)	2–1	Kufa – Dumek (CZE)	17–21	24–22	15–8	56–51	Report

== Knockout stage ==
=== Round of 24 ===
Date	Time		Score		Set 1	Set 2	Set 3	Total	Report
19 Jun	20:00	Kubala – Hadrava (CZE)	2–1	Marco – García (ESP)	16–21	21–15	15–13	52–49	Report
19 Jun	20:00	Kollo – Vesik (EST)	0–2	Salvetti – Daguerre (FRA)	18–21	18–21		36–42	Report
19 Jun	20:00	Hordvik – Kvamsdal (NOR)	1–2	Solovejs – Sorokins (LAT)	21–18	18–21	21–23	60–62	Report
19 Jun	21:00	Santos – Rudykh (AZE)	2–1	Denin – Plotnytskyi (UKR)	21–15	20–22	15–12	56–49	Report
19 Jun	22:00	Barsuk – Koshkarev (RUS)	2–1	Romano – Gritsai (AZE)	17–21	21–17	15–13	53–51	Report
19 Jun	19:00	Kavalenka – Dziadkou (BLR)	2–0	Şekerci – Mermer (TUR)	21–16	21–17		42–33	Report
19 Jun	19:00	Kosiak – Rudoł (POL)	2–1	Eglseer – Müllner (AUT)	21–17	18–21	19–17	58–55	Report
19 Jun	19:00	Kotsilianos – Zoupanis (GRE)	1–2	Kufa – Dumek (CZE)	22–24	21–17	14–16	57–57	Report

=== Round of 16 ===
Date	Time		Score		Set 1	Set 2	Set 3	Total	Report
20 Jun	11:00	Ranghieri – Rossi (ITA)	1–2	Kubala – Hadrava (CZE)	21–12	19–21	13–15	53–48	Report
20 Jun	11:00	Chevallier – Krattiger (SUI)	2–1	Salvetti – Daguerre (FRA)	15–21	21–15	17–15	53–51	Report
20 Jun	11:00	Faiga – Hilman (ISR)	2–0	Solovejs – Sorokins (LAT)	21–14	21–15		42–29	Report
20 Jun	10:00	Pļaviņš – Regža (LAT)	2–1	Santos – Rudykh (AZE)	20–22	21–16	15–13	56–51	Report
20 Jun	11:00	P. Ingrosso – M. Ingrosso (ITA)	1–2	Barsuk – Koshkarev (RUS)	20–22	21–15	6–15	47–52	Report
20 Jun	10:00	Kildegaard – Abell (DEN)	0–2	Kavalenka – Dziadkou (BLR)	18–21	16–21		34–42	Report
20 Jun	10:00	Winter – Petutsching (AUT)	2–0	Kosiak – Rudoł (POL)	21–17	21–19		42–36	Report
20 Jun	10:00	Kissling – Strasser (SUI)	2–0	Kufa – Dumek (CZE)	21–18	21–18		42–36	Report

=== Quarterfinals ===
Date	Time		Score		Set 1	Set 2	Set 3	Total	Report
20 Jun	20:00	Kubala – Hadrava (CZE)	2–0	Chevallier – Krattiger (SUI)	25–23	21–17		46–40	Report
20 Jun	19:00	Faiga – Hilman (ISR)	0–2	Pļaviņš – Regža (LAT)	13–21	15–21		28–42	Report
20 Jun	18:00	Barsuk – Koshkarev (RUS)	2–0	Kavalenka – Dziadkou (BLR)	21–19	28–26		49–45	Report
20 Jun	17:00	Winter – Petutsching (AUT)	1–2	Kissling – Strasser (SUI)	21–18	21–23	12–15	54–56	Report

=== Semifinals ===
Date	Time		Score		Set 1	Set 2	Set 3	Total	Report
21 Jun	10:00	Kubala – Hadrava (CZE)	0–2	Pļaviņš – Regža (LAT)	14–21	17–21		31–42	Report
21 Jun	11:00	Barsuk – Koshkarev (RUS)	2–0	Kissling – Strasser (SUI)	21–18	29–27		50–45	Report

=== Bronze medal game ===
Date	Time		Score		Set 1	Set 2	Set 3	Total	Report
21 Jun	20:00	Kubala – Hadrava (CZE)	2–0	Kissling – Strasser (SUI)	21–17	21–15		42–32	Report

=== Final ===
Date	Time		Score		Set 1	Set 2	Set 3	Total	Report
21 Jun	21:00	Pļaviņš – Regža (LAT)	2–1	Barsuk – Koshkarev (RUS)	21–16	18–21	15–10	54–47	Report
