= 2011 Beach Volleyball World Championships =

World championship

2011 World Championship
- Location: Rome, Italy
- Dates: 13 June – 19 June

Champions
- Men: Brazil; Emanuel Rego; Alison Cerutti
- Women: Brazil; Larissa França; Juliana Silva

The 2011 FIVB Beach Volleyball Swatch World Championships were a beach volleyball double-gender event, which were held from June 13 to 19, 2011 in Rome, Italy. The Swatch FIVB World Championships are organized every two years, and Italy hosted the event for the first time. 48 teams per gender entered the competition making 96 total.

== Medal summary ==
=== Medal events ===
Event	Gold	Silver	Bronze
Men's event	Emanuel Rego and Alison Cerutti (BRA)	Márcio Araújo and Ricardo Santos (BRA)	Julius Brink and Jonas Reckermann (GER)
Women's event	Larissa França and Juliana Silva (BRA)	Misty May-Treanor and Kerri Walsh (USA)	Xue Chen and Zhang Xi (CHN)

=== Medal table ===
Rank	Nation	Gold	Silver	Bronze	Total
1	Brazil	2	1	0	3
2	United States	0	1	0	1
3	China	0	0	1	1
3	Germany	0	0	1	1
Totals (4 entries)		2	2	2	6
