= Pedro Cunha (volleyball) =

Brazilian beach volleyball player (born 1983)

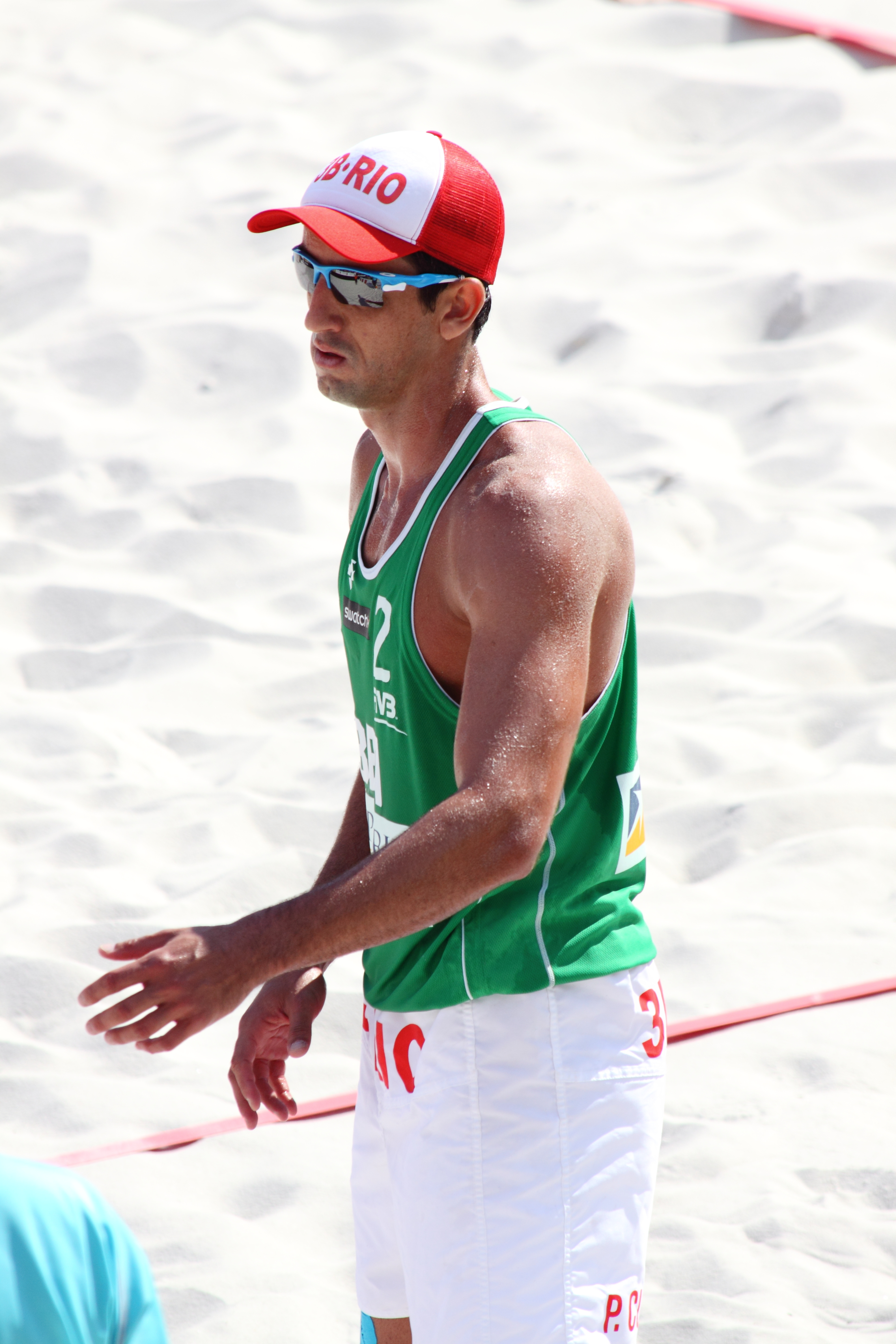
- Cunha at the FIVB World Tour in Prague, 2012.

Personal information
- Born: June 10, 1983 (age 43); Rio de Janeiro, Brazil

Pedro Cunha (born 10 June 1983 in Rio de Janeiro) is a retired Brazilian male beach volleyball player. He partnered with Ricardo Santos at the 2012 Summer Olympics tournament.
