= Jesús Villafañe =

Venezuelan beach volleyball player (born 1986)

Personal information
- Full name: Jesus Villafañe Marquina
- Born: 19 November 1986 (age 39); Barinas, Venezuela

Beach volleyball information
Teammate
Igor Hernández
Honours
Representing Venezuela
Pan American Games
Silver medal – second place	2011 Guadalajara	Men's

Jesus Villafañe Marquina (born 19 November 1986) is a Venezuelan beach volleyball player. He played with Igor Hernández at the 2012 Summer Olympics. He was born in Barinas, Venezuela.
