= Jefferson Bellaguarda =

Swiss beach volleyball player (born 1976)

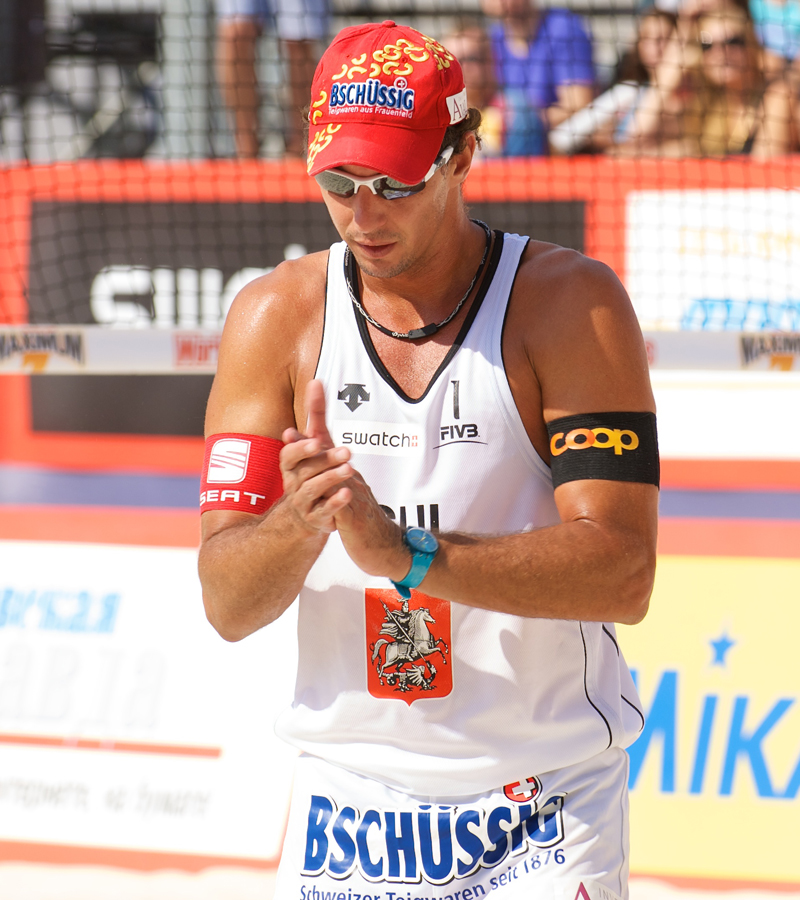
Jefferson Bellaguarda

Jefferson Bellaguarda (born 12 September 1976) is a Swiss male beach volleyball player. He competed for Switzerland at the 2012 Summer Olympics, teaming with Patrick Heuscher. Together they reached the last 16.
