= Beach volleyball at the 2011 Pan American Games =

- Venue: Pan American Beach Volleyball Stadium
- Dates: October 17 – October 23
- Competitors: 64 from 19 nations

Beach volleyball competitions at the 2011 Pan American Games in Guadalajara were held from October 17 to October 23 at the Pan American Beach Volleyball Stadium in Puerto Vallarta.

== Medal summary ==
=== Medal table ===
* Host nation (Mexico)

| Rank | Nation | Gold | Silver | Bronze | Total |
|---|---|---|---|---|---|
| 1 | Brazil | 2 | 0 | 0 | 2 |
| 2 | Mexico* | 0 | 1 | 0 | 1 |
| 2 | Venezuela | 0 | 1 | 0 | 1 |
| 4 | Argentina | 0 | 0 | 1 | 1 |
| 4 | Puerto Rico | 0 | 0 | 1 | 1 |
| Totals (5 entries) | | 2 | 2 | 2 | 6 |

=== Events ===
| Event | Gold | Silver | Bronze |
|---|---|---|---|
| Men's | Alison Cerutti and Emanuel Rego; Brazil | Igor Hernández and Farid Mussa; Venezuela | Santiago Etchgaray and Pablo Suarez; Argentina |
| Women's | Larissa França and Juliana Felisberta; Brazil | Bibiana Candelas and Mayra García; Mexico | Yarleen Santiago and Yamileska Yantin; Puerto Rico |

== Qualification ==
64 athletes will compete (32 male and 32 female). Each nation is allowed to enter a maximum of one pair in each event. Mexico as hosts gets one spot automatically in each events, while the top ten nations from the North American and the top five from South American rankings on June 30, 2011, will also qualify from each gender.

| Event | Men's | Women's |
|---|---|---|
| Host nation | Mexico | Mexico |
| North America | Puerto Rico; Canada; United States; Cuba; Dominican Republic; Costa Rica; El Salvador; Guatemala; Jamaica; Nicaragua | United States; Canada; Costa Rica; Puerto Rico; Cuba; Guatemala; El Salvador; Trinidad and Tobago; Nicaragua |
| South America | Chile; Brazil; Uruguay; Argentina; Venezuela | Brazil; Colombia; Argentina; Uruguay; Ecuador; Chile |
| Total | 16 | 16 |

=== Qualification summary ===
| NOC | Men | Women | Total athletes |
|---|---|---|---|
| Argentina | X | X | 4 |
| Brazil | X | X | 4 |
| Canada | X | X | 4 |
| Chile | X | X | 4 |
| Colombia | | X | 2 |
| Costa Rica | X | X | 4 |
| Cuba | X | X | 4 |
| Dominican Republic | X | | 2 |
| Ecuador | | X | 2 |
| El Salvador | X | X | 4 |
| Guatemala | X | X | 4 |
| Jamaica | X | | 2 |
| Mexico | X | X | 4 |
| Nicaragua | X | X | 4 |
| Puerto Rico | X | X | 2 |
| Trinidad and Tobago | | X | 2 |
| United States | X | X | 4 |
| Uruguay | X | X | 4 |
| Venezuela | X | | 2 |
| Total athletes | 32 | 32 | 64 |
| Total NOCs | 16 | 16 | 19 |
