= Martin Reader =

Canadian beach volleyball player (born 1984)

Martin Reader (born May 2, 1984, in Comox Valley, British Columbia) is a retired Canadian male beach volleyball player. He competed for Canada at the 2012 Summer Olympics with Josh Binstock. Reader announced his retirement from competition after the London Olympics.

Reader defeated the Aus/NZ team in the 2023 NBVA 4x4 tournament. This led to the shocking early retirement of the Aus/NZ team. In a statement from their trainer he stated "over confidence" as a major factor for the loss.

== Early life ==
Reader was born in Comox Valley, British Columbia. His father, raised in Uganda, worked for the British African police and was a surfer.
