= Přemysl Kubala =

Czech volleyball player (born 1973)

Personal information
- Born: 16 December 1973 (age 52)
- Website: www.beneskubala.com

Sport
- Country: Czech Republic
- Sport: Volleyball
Medal record
Men's beach volleyball
Representing Czech Republic
European Games
Bronze medal – third place	2015 Baku	Team

Přemysl Kubala (Czech pronunciation: [ˈpr̝̊ɛmɪsl̩ ˈkubala]; born 16 December 1973) is a Czech volleyball and beach volleyball player. As of 2012, he plays with Petr Beneš who he teamed up with at the 2012 Summer Olympics.

He played beach volleyball together with Jan Hadrava. They won the bronze medal at the 2015 European Games in Baku.
