= Igor Hernández =

Venezuelan beach volleyball player (born 1977)

Personal information
- Full name: Igor Hernández Colina
- Nationality: Venezuela
- Born: 22 January 1977 (age 49); San Carlos, Cojedes, Venezuela

Beach volleyball information
Teammate
Jesus Villafañe
Honours
Pan American Games
Silver medal – second place	2011 Guadalajara	Men's

Igor Hernández Colina (born 22 January 1977) is a Venezuelan beach volleyball player. He played with Jesus Villafañe at the 2012 Summer Olympics.
