= Tarjei Skarlund =

Norwegian beach volleyball player (born 1978)

Personal information
- Nationality: Norwegian
- Born: 6 November 1978 (age 47); Ålesund, Norway
- Height: 190 cm (6 ft 3 in)

Beach volleyball information

Current teammate
Years	Teammate
2008–present	Martin Spinnangr

Previous teammates
Years	Teammate	Tours (points)
2005–2008	Jørre Kjemperud; Jarle Huseby; Kjell Gøranson	59 (5063); 13 (98); 11 (379)

Tarjei Skarlund (born 6 November 1978) is a male beach volleyball player from Norway. With teammate Jørre Kjemperud, he represented Norway in beach volleyball at the 2008 Summer Olympics in Beijing, China.

At the 2012 Summer Olympics, he competed with Martin Spinnangr.
