= Grzegorz Fijałek =

Polish beach volleyball player (born 1987)

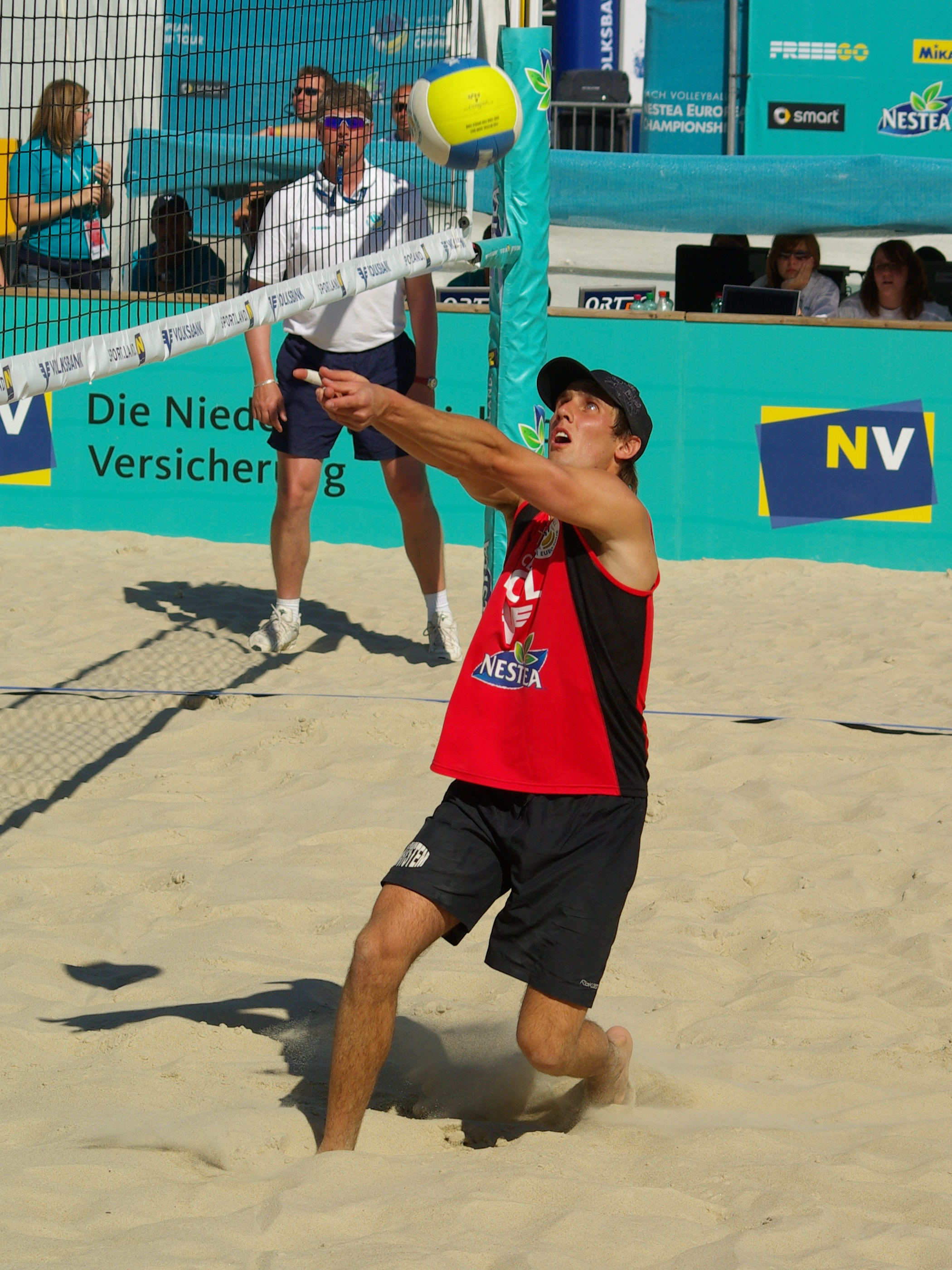
- Fijałek in 2008

Personal information
- Born: 11 May 1987 (age 39); Andrychów, Poland
Honours
Men's beach volleyball
Representing Poland
European Championships
Bronze medal – third place	2013 Klagenfurt	Beach

Grzegorz Fijałek (born 11 May 1987 in Andrychów) is a Polish male beach volleyball player. He competed in the 2012 Summer Olympics with his partner Mariusz Prudel. The other teams in their pool, group D, were Aleksandrs Samoilovs and Ruslans Sorokins (Latvia), Jake Gibb and Sean Rosenthal (USA) and the South African team of Freedom Chiya and Grant Goldschmidt. They lost to the Latvian team, but beat the South African and American teams. Next they played the Swiss pair of Sascha Heyer and Seba Chevallier in the last 16, winning two sets to nil. In the quarterfinals they lost to the Brazilian team of Emanuel Rego and Alison Cerutti.

Prudel and Fijałek were considered to be medal contenders in the 2012 Olympics.
