= Martin Spinnangr =

Norwegian beach volleyball player

Martin Spinnangr (born 5 May 1987) is a Norwegian beach volleyball player. He was born in Farsund Municipality, Norway. He competed at the 2012 Summer Olympics in London with Tarjei Skarlund. They reached the last 16, where they lost to the Latvian team of Plavins and Smedins.
