= Josh Binstock =

Canadian beach volleyball player (born 1981)

Personal information
- Full name: Joshua Binstock
- Nickname: Binner
- Nationality: Canada
- Born: January 12, 1981 (age 45); Toronto, Ontario, Canada
- Hometown: Richmond Hill, Ontario
- Height: 196 cm (6 ft 5 in)
- Education: Toronto

Beach volleyball information

Current teammate
Teammate
Sam Schachter

Previous teammates
Years	Teammate
2008–09; 2012	Matt Zbyszewski; Martin Reader
Honours
Representing Canada
Men's beach volleyball
NORCECA Beach Volleyball Circuit
Silver medal – second place	2009 Puerto Vallarta	Beach
Bronze medal – third place	2009 Manzanillo	Beach
Maccabiah Games
Gold medal – first place	2017 Israel	Beach
Men's indoor volleyball
Maccabiah Games
Silver medal – second place	2013 Israel	Indoor

Joshua "Josh" Binstock (born January 12, 1981), nicknamed Binner, is a male two-time Olympian beach volleyball player from Canada. He competed in the 2012 Olympics in London and the 2016 Summer Olympics in Rio. He also competed for Canada in volleyball in Israel in the 2001 Maccabiah Games, the 2005 Maccabiah Games, the 2009 Maccabiah Games, the 2013 Maccabiah Games (at which he was Canada's flag-bearer, and won a silver medal), and the 2017 Maccabiah Games (at which he won a gold medal). In 2014, he and his partner were Canadian national champions, his third national championship.

== Personal life ==
Binstock, who is Jewish, is 6 feet 5 inches (1.96 m) tall, and weighs 218 pounds (99 kg). His parents are Howard and Suzanne, and he has siblings Aaron, Michelle, and Todd.

His hometown is Richmond Hill, Ontario, and he graduated from Richmond Hill High School (Ontario). He attended the University of Toronto, where he received a Bachelor of Health and Physical Education in 2004. He is a trained chiropractor, having earned a Doctorate of Chiropractic at the Canadian Memorial Chiropractic College in 2009.

== Volleyball career ==
Binstock began competing in volleyball when he was 23 years old, on the beach circuit during his off-season from the University of Toronto. He is known for his defensive ability and is able to play the left and right side. He is known to be a good setter and has a very efficient side out game.

He won two straight Canadian National Championships with Matt Zbyszewski, in 2008 and 2009.

In 2014 he and partner Sam Schachter were Canadian national champions, his third national championship, and also won a gold medal at the Paraná Open, an FIVB (international volleyball federation) World Tour event. In 2015 they placed 9th at the FIVB World Championship, and came in second at the Major Series tournament in Poreč, Croatia.

=== Olympics ===
Binstock competed in the 2012 Summer Olympics in London with his teammate Martin Reader. He played beach volleyball in the 2016 Summer Olympics in Rio with Sam Schachter.

=== Maccabiah Games ===
He competed for Canada in volleyball in the 2001 Maccabiah Games, the 2005 Maccabiah Games, the 2009 Maccabiah Games, and the 2013 Maccabiah Games in Israel, at which he was Canada's flag-bearer and won a silver medal in the indoor competition. At the 2017 Maccabiah Games, he and Aaron Nusbaum went undefeated to win the gold medal in men's beach volleyball.

=== Sponsors ===
Binstock is sponsored by Overkill, Canuck Stuff, and Bolle.

== See also ==
- List of select Jewish volleyball players
