= Petr Beneš =

Czech beach volleyball player (born 1974)

Personal information
- Born: 27 November 1974; Prague, Czechoslovakia
- Website: www.beneskubala.com

Sport
- Country: Czech Republic
- Sport: Volleyball

Petr Beneš (Czech pronunciation: [ˈpɛtr̩ ˈbɛnɛʃ]; born 27 November 1974) is a Czech beach volleyball player. He played with Přemysl Kubala at the 2012 Summer Olympics.
