= Jan Hadrava =

Czech volleyball player (born 1991)

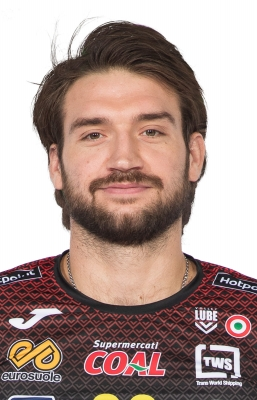

Personal information
- Born: 3 June 1991 (age 35); Rokycany, Czech Republic
- Height: 1.99 m (6 ft 6 in)
- Weight: 101 kg (223 lb)
- Spike: 357 cm (141 in)
- Block: 335 cm (132 in)

Volleyball information
- Position: Opposite
- Current club: AZS Olsztyn
- Number: 91

Career
Years	Teams
2011–2014; 2014–2016; 2016–2020; 2020–2021; 2021–2023; 2023–2024; 2024–	Dukla Liberec; Nantes Rezé Métropole; AZS Olsztyn; Cucine Lube Civitanova; Jastrzębski Węgiel; Galatasaray; AZS Olsztyn

National team
Czech Republic
Honours
Men's volleyball
Representing Czech Republic
FIVB Challenger Cup
Silver medal – second place	2018 Matosinhos
European League
Silver medal – second place	2018 Czech Republic

Jan Hadrava (born 3 June 1991) is a Czech professional volleyball player who plays as an opposite spiker for Indykpol AZS Olsztyn and the Czech Republic national team.

== Career ==
For the 2023–24 season, he signed a contract with Galatasaray, one of the Turkish Men's Volleyball League teams.

== Honours ==
=== Club ===
- CEV Champions League
  - 2022–23 – with Jastrzębski Węgiel
- Domestic
  - 2012–13 Czech Cup, with Dukla Liberec
  - 2013–14 Czech Cup, with Dukla Liberec
  - 2020–21 Italian Cup, with Cucine Lube Civitanova
  - 2020–21 Italian Championship, with Cucine Lube Civitanova
  - 2021–22 Polish SuperCup, with Jastrzębski Węgiel
  - 2022–23 Polish SuperCup, with Jastrzębski Węgiel
  - 2022–23 Polish Championship, with Jastrzębski Węgiel

=== Individual awards ===
- 2022: Best Czech volleyball player

=== Statistics ===
- 2017–18 PlusLiga – Best scorer (737 points)
- 2017–18 PlusLiga – Best spiker (624 points)
