= Sergey Prokopyev (beach volleyball) =

Russian beach volleyball player (born 1986)

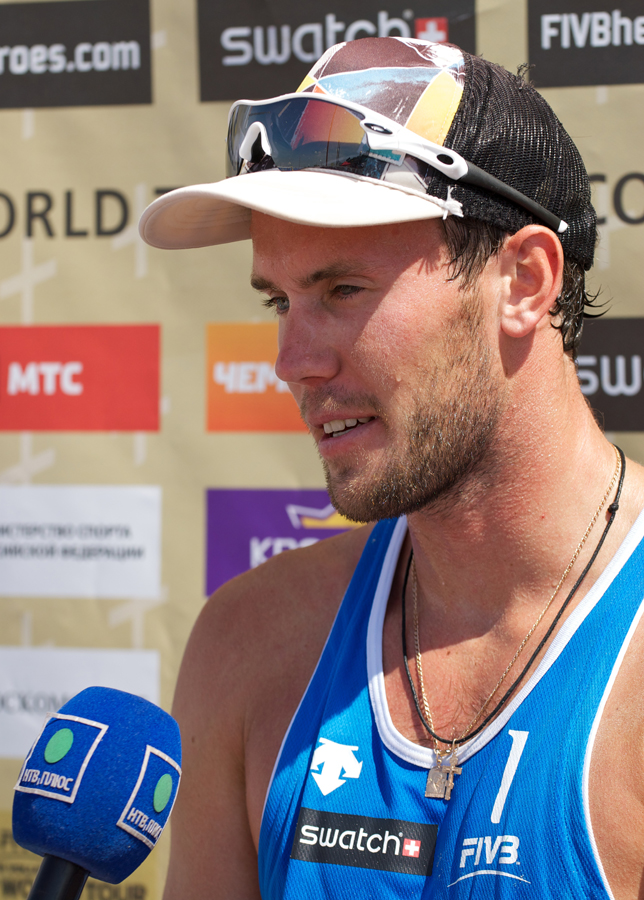
Sergey Prokopyev

Sergey Prokopyev (born 21 August 1986) is a Russian beach volleyball player. He competed for Russia at the 2012 Summer Olympics with Konstantin Semenov.
