= Mariusz Prudel =

Polish beach volleyball player (born 1986)

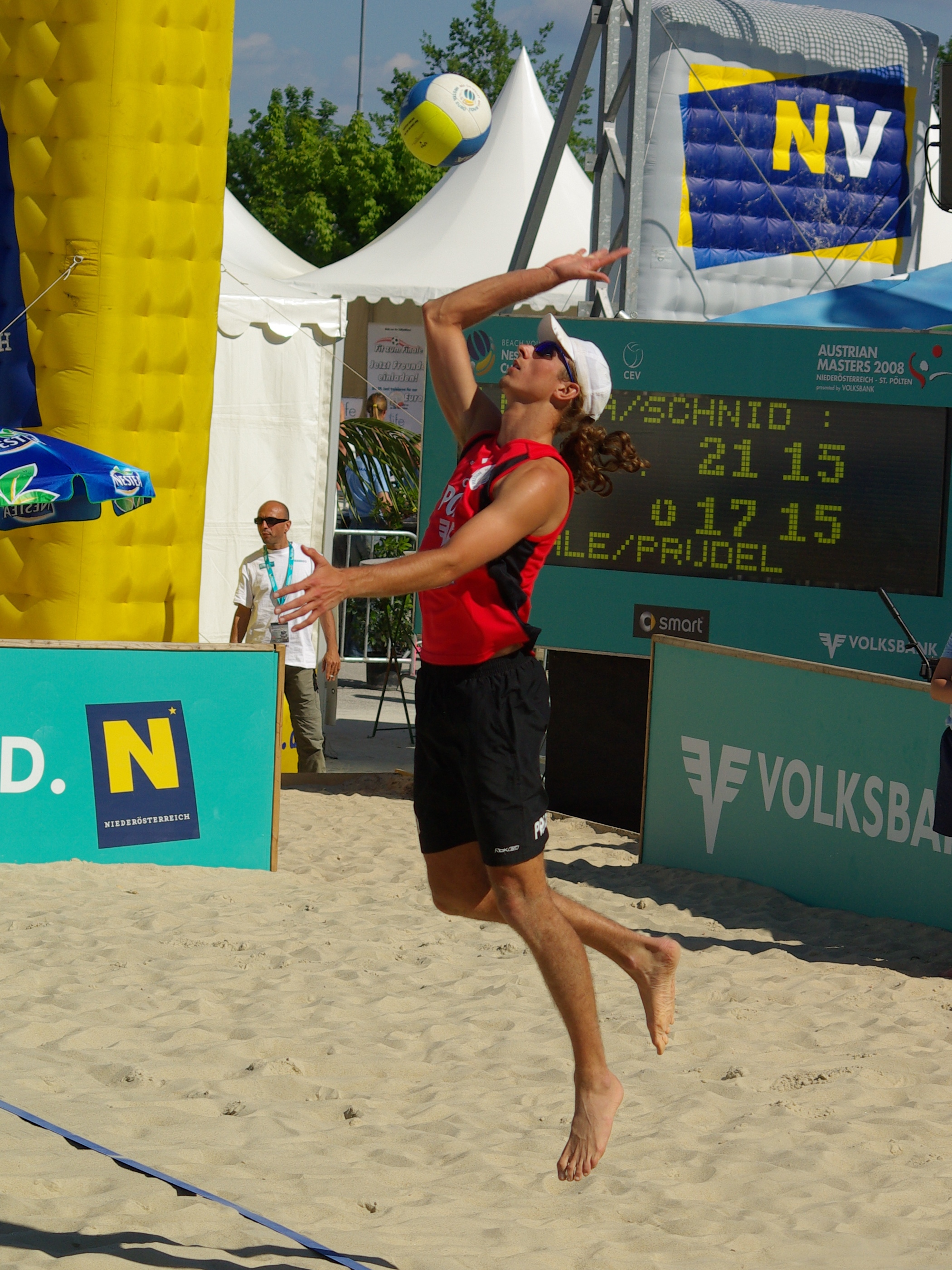
- Prudel in 2008

Personal information
- Nickname: Prudi
- Born: 21 January 1986 (age 40); Rybnik, Poland
- Hometown: Rybnik, Poland
- Height: 1.91 m (6 ft 3 in)
- Weight: 80 kg (176 lb)

Beach volleyball information

Current teammate
Teammate
Grzegorz Fijałek

Previous teammates
Teammate
Grzegorz Fijałek
Honours
Men's beach volleyball
Representing Poland
European Championships
Bronze medal – third place	2013 Klagenfurt	Beach

Mariusz Prudel (born 21 January 1986) is a male beach volleyball player from Poland. He competed in the 2012 Summer Olympics with his partner Grzegorz Fijałek. The other teams in their pool, group D, were Aleksandrs Samoilovs and Ruslans Sorokins (Latvia), Jake Gibb and Sean Rosenthal (USA) and the South African team of Freedom Chiya and Grant Goldschmidt. They lost to the Latvian team, but beat the South African and American teams. Next they played the Swiss pair of Sascha Heyer and Seba Chevallier in the last 16, winning two sets to nil. In the quarterfinals they lost to the Brazilian team of Emanuel Rego and Alison Cerutti.

Prudel and Fijałek were considered to be medal contenders in the 2012 Olympics. He and Fijałek were ranked fifth before the competition began after placing 25th at The Hague Open, the pair's 2012 debut. However, the two placed seventh in the Olympic qualifiers. In July 2012, Prudel and Fijałek won a bronze medal at the Berlin Grand Slam.

Prudel was born in 1986 in his hometown of Rybnik, Poland. He is coached by Martin Olejnak and is married to Ani Prudel.

Awards
Preceded by Bruno Oscar Schmidt (BRA)	Men's FIVB World Tour "Most Improved"; 2011	Succeeded by Paolo Nicolai (ITA)
