= Konstantin Semenov =

Russian beach volleyball player (born 1989)

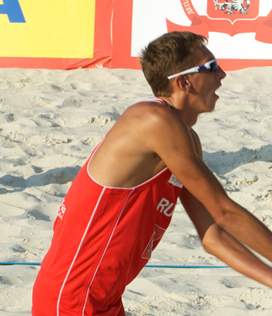
- Semenov in Moscow, 2011

Personal information
- Nationality: (Russia) Russian
- Born: 9 June 1989 (age 37)
- Height: 210 cm (6 ft 11 in)
Honours
Men's beach volleyball
Representing Russia
European Championships
Silver medal – second place	2016 Biel/Bienne	Beach
Silver medal – second place	2019 Moscow	Beach
FIVB World Tour
Gold medal – first place	2014 Moscow	Beach
Gold medal – first place	2013 Anapa	Beach
Silver medal – second place	2016 Sochi	Beach
Silver medal – second place	2014 Anapa	Beach
Silver medal – second place	2013 Berlin	Beach
Bronze medal – third place	2016 smart Major Hamburg	Beach
Bronze medal – third place	2016 Xiamen	Beach
Bronze medal – third place	2011 The Hague	Beach
CEV European Tour
Gold medal – first place	2013 Baden	Beach
Gold medal – first place	2013 Antalya	Beach
Universiade
Bronze medal – third place	2013 Kazan	Beach

Konstantin Sergeyevich Semenov (Russian: Константин Сергеевич Семёнов; born 9 June 1989, Tokmok) is a Russian beach volleyball player. He competed for Russia at the 2012 Summer Olympics with his teammate Sergey Prokopyev finishing at the shared 9th place. As of August 2013 he has won one tournament in the FIVB World Tour and two in the CEV European Tour alongside two other podium spots in the World Tour. At the 2016 Summer Olympics, Semenov and his new teammate Vyacheslav Krasilnikov finished as fourth. Since the end of 2017, Semenov plays with Ilya Leshukov. They qualified for 2020 Summer Olympics in Tokyo.
