= Daniele Lupo =

Italian beach volleyball player

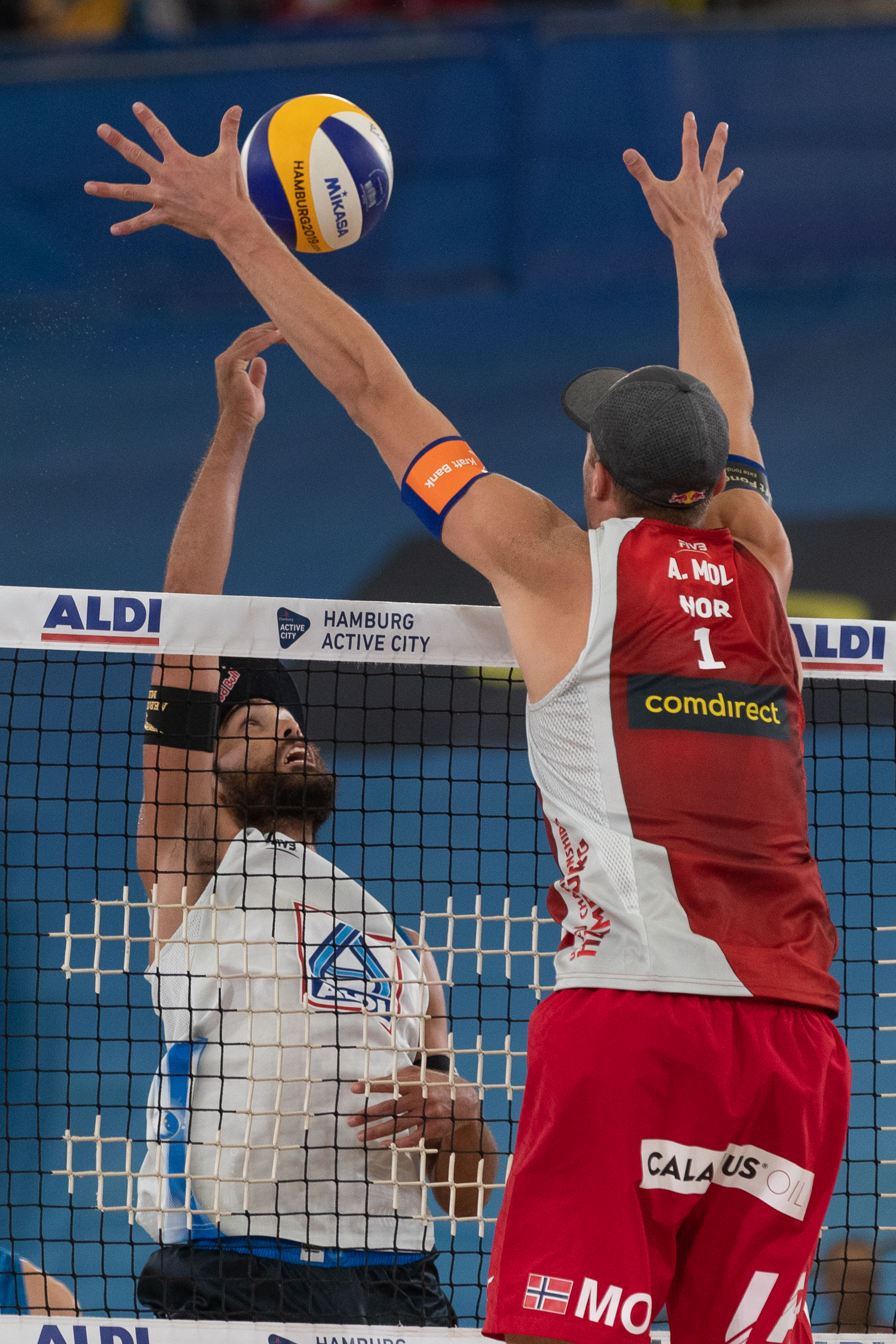
- Lupo (left) at the 2019 World Championships

Personal information
- Nationality: Italian
- Born: 6 May 1991 (age 35); Rome, Italy
- Height: 194 cm (6 ft 4 in)
Honours
Men's beach volleyball
Representing Italy
Olympic Games
Silver medal – second place	2016 Rio de Janeiro	Beach

Daniele Lupo (born 6 May 1991) is an Italian beach volleyball player. He competed for Italy at the 2016 Summer Olympics and at the 2020 Summer Olympics. Along with partner, Paolo Nicolai, he won the silver medal in men's beach volleyball in 2016. He was the flag bearer for Italy during the closing ceremony.

== Biography ==
Lupo was born in Rome to an Italian father and a Kazakh mother.

Lupo debuted in the international beach volley circuit on 18 May 2010 in Rome, and obtained his first podium in a World Tour stage at Beijing in May 2012, together with Paolo Nicolai. The two finished fifth in the 2012 Olympic Games and ninth in the 2013 World Championships. In 2014 Lupo and Nicolai were the first Italians to win a European Championship in the tournament held in Cagliari.

In 2015, Lupo was diagnosed with a bone tumor, but was completely cured. The following year, Lupo and Nicolai won the European Championship again, and they were the first Italian team ever to reach a final in the Summer Olympics.
