= Sébastien Chevallier =

Swiss beach volleyball player (born 1987)

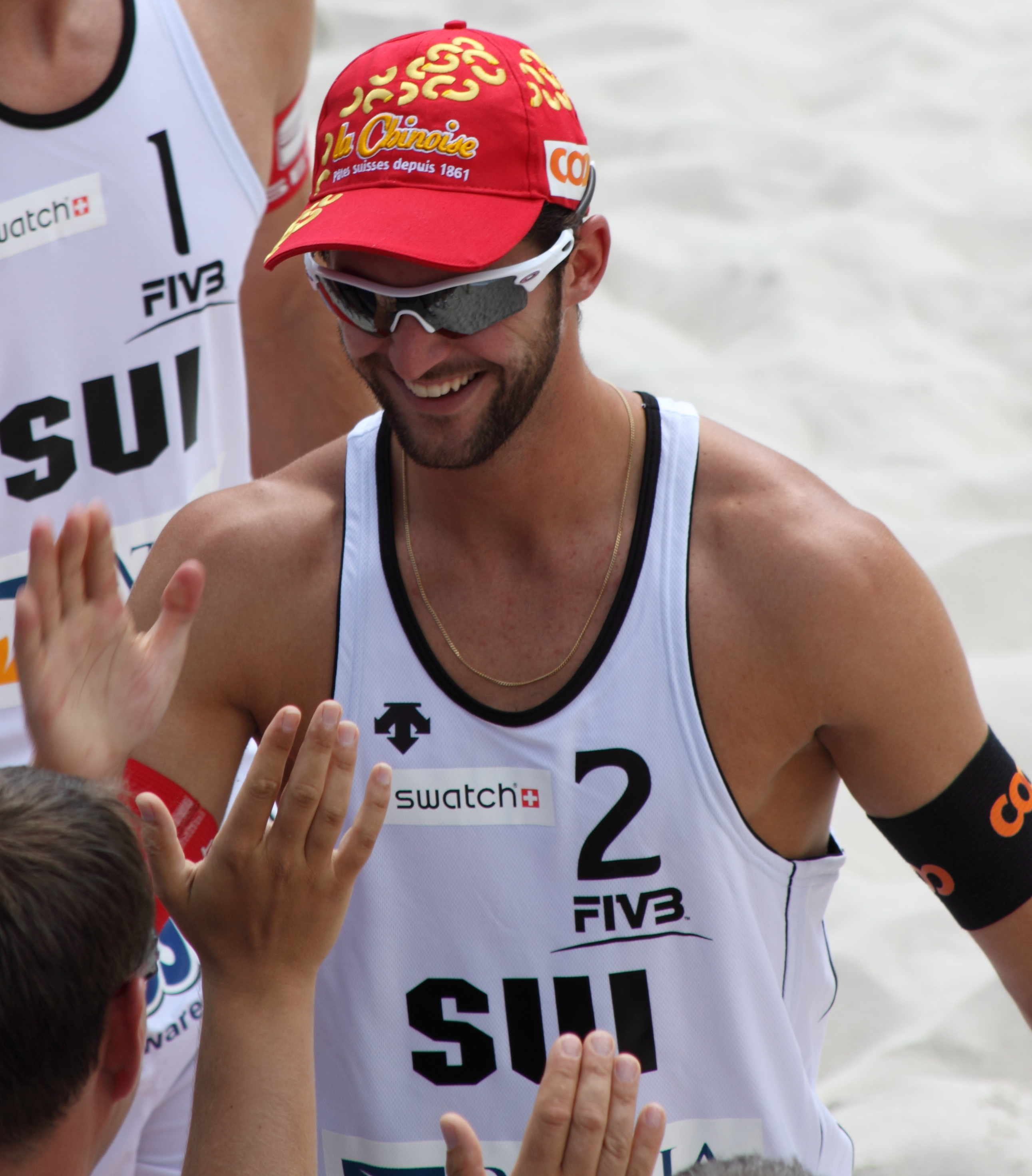
- Sébastien Chevallier in 2011

Personal information
- Nickname: Seba
- Born: 14 July 1987 (age 39); Versoix, Switzerland
- Height: 1.94 m (6 ft 4 1/2 in)

Beach volleyball information

Current teammate
Teammate
Mats Kovatsch

Sébastien Chevallier (born 14 July 1987) is a Swiss beach volleyball player. He partnered with Sascha Heyer at the 2012 Summer Olympics tournament where they lost in the round of 16.

Awards
Preceded by Karl Jaani (EST)	Men's FIVB Beach World Tour "Top Rookie"; 2011	Succeeded by Christiaan Varenhorst (NED)
