= Ruslans Sorokins =

Latvian beach volleyball player (born 1982)

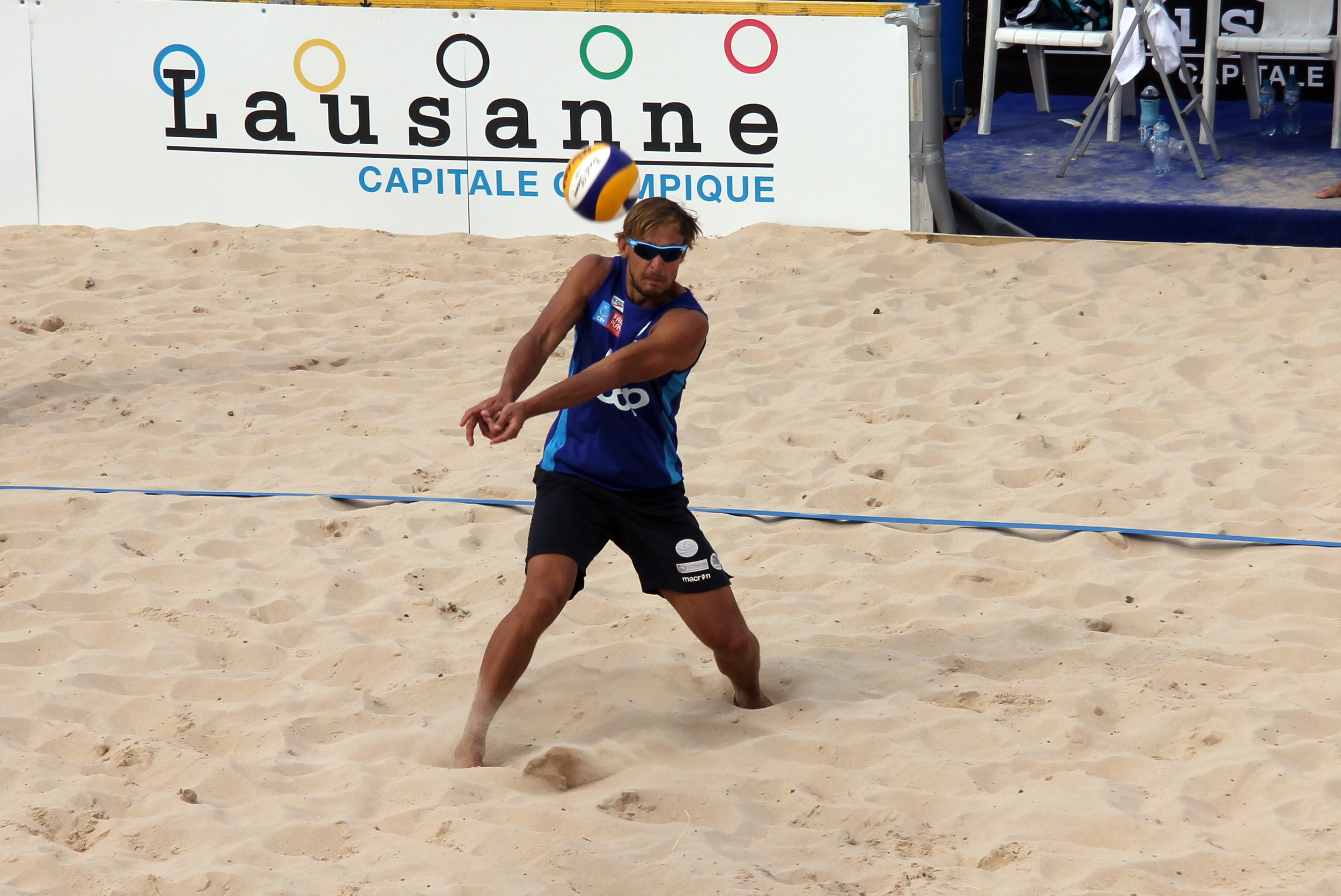
- CEV Beach Volleyball Satellite Lausanne 2014

Personal information
- Nationality: Latvian
- Born: 11 March 1982 (age 44) Riga, Latvia

Sport
- Country: Latvia
- Sport: Beach volleyball

Ruslans Sorokins (born 11 March 1982) is a Latvian beach volleyball player. As of 2012, he plays with Aleksandrs Samoilovs. They qualified for 2012 Summer Olympics in London, where they reached the last 16.

Awards
Preceded by Adrián Gavira (ESP)	Men's FIVB Beach World Tour "Top Rookie"; 2009	Succeeded by Karl Jaani (EST)
