= List of University of Calgary people =

This is a list of people associated with the University of Calgary.

== Alumni ==
Alumni are listed by their department of study.

=== Archeology ===
- Peter Mathews, B.A.: Mayanist, MacArthur Fellow at Yale University
- Ronald Wright: award-winning Cambridge University-educated author and historian

=== Business administration, commerce ===
- Al Duerr, M.B.A.: mayor of Calgary
- Charlie Fischer, B.Sc (engineering), M.B.A.: president and CEO of Nexen Inc
- Russ Girling, B. Comm., M.B.A.: president & CEO, TransCanada Corporation
- Gary Kovacs, M.B.A.: CEO of Mozilla Corporation
- Hal Kvisle, M.B.A.: CEO of Talsiman, member of the Trilateral Commission
- Ezra Levant, B.Comm.: journalist, conservative writer and commentator
- Jinder Mahal, B.Comm.: professional wrestler
- Devant Maharaj, B.Comm.: former senator and minister of Food Production, Trinidad and Tobago
- Naheed Nenshi, B.Comm.: also educated at Harvard University, mayor of Calgary
- Rob Renner, B.Comm: minister of Environment for Alberta
- Jonathan Scott, B.Comm.: actor known for his work on Property Brothers
- W. Brett Wilson, O.C., M.B.A.: businessman, philanthropist, member of the Order of Canada
- John Zaozirny, B.Comm.: lawyer, minister of Energy for Alberta

=== Classics ===
- Michael Lapidge, B.A.: medieval scholar, fellow emeritus of Clare College, Cambridge University; Fellow of the British Academy, recipient of the Sir Israel Gollancz Prize

=== Computer science ===
- Theo de Raadt, B.Sc. 1992: founder and leader of OpenBSD and other projects developed with University of California at Berkeley and DARPA
- Marina Gavrilova, Ph.D. 1999: biometric security, machine learning
- James Gosling OC, B.Sc. 1977: inventor of the Java programming language
- Radford M. Neal, B.Sc., M.Sc.: Research Chair in Statistics and Machine Learning
- Xiaolin Wu, B.Ss. Wuhan University, Ph.D. Calgary 1988: computer engineer, invented programming line algorithm, co-developed neural network facial recognition system (with Xi Zhang), twice featured in MIT's Technology Review, member of Institute of Electrical and Electronics Engineers

=== Economics ===
- Stephen Harper, B.A. 1985, M.A. 1991: prime minister of Canada
- Danielle Smith, B.A.: politician, 19th premier of Alberta
- Chip Wilson B.A.: founder of Lululemon

=== Engineering ===
- Klaus-Jurgen Bathe, M.Sc.: pioneer of finite element analysis, professor of mechanical engineering at MIT
- Garrett Camp, B.Eng., M.Sc. computer science: co-founded StumbleUpon and Uber
- M. Elizabeth Cannon: fellow of the Royal Society of Canada
- Arne Dankers, M.Sc.: Canadian Olympic silver medalist in team pursuit speed skating
- Gerald Fuller, B.Sc.: professor of chemical engineering at Stanford University
- Grant Mossop, B.Sc., M.Sc.: director of the Geological Survey of Canada
- Christine Nesbitt: Canadian Olympic gold medalist in long track speed skating
- Robert Thirsk, B.Sc. 1985: astronaut

=== English, literature, humanities, fine arts ===
- Kirsten Abrahamson, B.F.A. (ceramics), M.F.A. (sculpture): ceramic artist
- Bernadette Andrea, B.A., M.A.: C. Jacobs Endowed Professor in Literature at University of Texas, Ph.D. at Cornell University
- Daniel Bartholomew-Poyser, B.A.: orchestral conductor
- Derek Michael Besant, B.F.A.: internationally acclaimed artist, member of Royal Canadian Academy of Arts
- Jennifer Brewin, M.F.A.: theatre creator and artistic director
- John Campbell, M.A.: held Wilde Professorship of Mental Philosophy, lectures at UC Berkeley
- Dulcie Foo Fat, M.A.: artist
- Don Gillmor, B.A.: writer, Governor General's award, Canadian National Magazine Awards, appeared in The Walrus and Rolling Stone
- Hiromi Goto, B.A. (English): Canadian-Japanese author and cultural critic, recipient of Commonwealth Writer's Prize
- Laurel Johannesson, M.F.A.: internationally exhibited artist, studied at the Royal College of Art, Visiting Artist at the American Academy in Rome
- Rosa Marchitelli, B.A. (English): CBC journalist in Vancouver
- Robert McKim, M.A.: professor of Religion, Ph.D. from Yale University
- Helen McLean, M.A.: painter
- L. R. Wright (Writing): mystery writer, recipient of Edgar Allen Award
- Jan Zwicky, B.A.: philosopher, poet

=== International relations ===
- Pierre Poilievre, B.A.: leader of the Conservative Party of Canada and leader of the Official Opposition, member of Parliament for Carleton

=== Kinesiology ===
- Paweensuda Drouin, B.Sc.: Miss Universe Thailand 2019
- Drew Scott, B.Sc.: actor known for his work on Property Brothers

=== Law ===
- Diane Ablonczy, LL.B.: member of Parliament of Canada
- Gary Botting, J.D.: lawyer, author, scholar, leading authority on Canadian extradition law
- Neil Brown, Q.C., B.Sc., LL.B.: lawyer, professor of biology, member of Alberta Legislative Assembly
- Nicholas Devlin, L.L.B.: lawyer and judge
- Kathleen Ganley, J.D.: attorney general of Alberta
- Eric Greif, LL.B.: entertainment lawyer and music producer
- Kent Hehr, J.D.: cabinet minister in Canadian Parliament
- Janet Keeping, LL.B.: architect from MIT and leader of the Green Party of Alberta
- Warren Kinsella, LL.B.: Toronto-based lawyer and political consultant, key strategist for the Liberal Party of Canada
- Harvey Locke, B.A., LL.B.: internationally recognized conservationist lawyer, named as Canada's 21st century leader by Time magazine
- Riaz Mamdani, J.D.: pharmacist, corporate lawyer, CEO of property developer Strategic Group
- Stephanie McLean, J.D.: Alberta cabinet minister
- Patricia Rowbotham, LL.B., LL.M. from Cambridge University: judge on Alberta Court of Appeal
- Irfan Sabir, J.D.: minister of Human Services of Alberta
- Christine E. Silverberg, J.D.: first female chief of Calgary Police Services, received Woman of Valour Award from B'nai B'rith
- Shannon Smallwood, LL.B.: chief justice of the Supreme Court of the Northwest Territories
- Judith A. Snider, LL.B.: judge on Federal Court of Canada, international mediator and arbitrator
- Linda Taylor, B.A., LL.B., LL.M. at Cambridge University: executive director at the United Nations Office of Administration of Justice (OAJ)
- Barbara M Young, LL.B.: justice on the Supreme Court of British Columbia

=== Mathematics ===
- Dwight Duffus, Ph.D.: Goodrich C White Professor of Mathematics at Emory University
- Peter Lancaster: professor of Mathematics, recipient of Humboldt Prize
- Douglas Wiens, B.Sc., M.Sc., Ph.D.: recipient of Lester R. Ford Award from Mathematical Association of America, fellow of American Statistical Association
- Ian H. Witten, M.Sc.: B.A. at Cambridge University, inventor of WEKA, fellow of the Royal Society of New Zealand

=== Medicine ===
- Jillian Cornish, Ph.D.: New Zealand biomedical researcher
- Sue Pedersen, M.D.: endocrinologist and world expert on obesity
- D. George Wyse, M.D.: pharmacologist, internationally recognized expert in cardiac arrhythmia

=== Natural sciences ===
- Terry Duguid, M.Sc. (Env. Des.): member of Canadian Parliament
- Ashton F. Embry, Ph.D.: Geological Survey of Canada scientist, fossil named in his honour
- Kenneth B. Storey, B.Sc: molecular biologist, appointed to Royal Society of Canada, member of American Association for the Advancement of Science
- Professor Joseph Sung, PhD: vice-chancellor / president of the Chinese University of Hong Kong (CUHK) and Mok Hing Yiu Professor of Medicine, CUHK
- Umesh Varshney, Ph.D.: molecular biologist at Indian Institute of Science, member of Indian National Science Academy
- Alice Vrielink, B.Sc., M.S.c.: vice president of Society of Crystallographers (Australia & New Zealand), member of American Crystallographic Association, Ph.D. from the University of London
- David A Wardle, Ph.D.: ecologist, fellow of the Royal Society of New Zealand
- Samuel Weiss, Ph.D.: pioneer in neurobiology
- Mingjie Zhang, Ph.D.: recipient of China's State Natural Science Award, member of Chinese Academy of Sciences

=== Political science ===
- Rob Anders, B.A.: member of Canadian Parliament
- Ian Brodie, M.A., Ph.D.: political scientist and former chief of staff to Prime Minister Stephen Harper
- Sharon Carstairs: member of the Senate of Canada
- Susanne Craig, B.A.: journalist for The Wall Street Journal and The New York Times
- Kyle Fawcett, B.A.: minister of Energy for Alberta
- Zsuzsi Gartner, B.A.: journalist at The Globe and Mail
- Pat Kelly, B.A.: member of Canadian Parliament
- Christopher Manfredi, B.A., M.A.: writer and constitutional scholar, Ph.D. Claremont Graduate School, Dean of Arts at McGill University
- Ricardo Miranda (born 1976): politician and trade unionist
- Ray Novak, Ph.D.: chief of staff to Canadian Prime Minister Stephen Harper
- Pierre Poilievre (born 1979): member of Canadian Parliament, leader of the Conservative Party of Canada and the leader of the Official Opposition
- Lee Richardson: member of the Canadian Parliament, also educated at the University of Oxford
- Murray Smith, B.A.: minister of Energy for Alberta
- Mercedes Stephenson, B.A.: journalist and military analyst
- Lorne Taylor, B.A.: minister of Environment for Alberta

=== Social sciences ===
- Imants Barušs, M.Sc. (Psychology): author, member of New York Academy of Sciences
- Reginald Bibby, O.C., M.A.: celebrated sociologist, member of the Order of Canada
- George Brizan, CGM CBE: prime minister of Grenada
- Keith Hampton, B.A. (Sociology): recipient of International Communication Association award, taught at MIT and University of Pennsylvania
- Jim Hawkes, M.Sc. (Psychology): chief aide to PM Joe Clark, leader of Progressive Conservative Party of Canada, government whip in House of Commons of Canada
- Zhang Ling, M.A.: novelist, recipient of the People's Literature Award in China
- Michael J. Neufeld, B.A.: historian and author, Ph.D. at Johns Hopkins University, curator of the Smithsonian's National Air and Space Museum
- Anita Vandenbeld, B.A.: international advisor with United Nations organizations, member of Canadian Parliament
- Erin Weir, M.A.: economist with Privy Council, member of Canadian Parliament
- Douglas Wiebe, B.A.: associate professor of epidemiology at Perelman School of Medicine at the University of Pennsylvania, senior fellow at Leonard Davis Institute of Health Economics

=== Social work, library studies, education, ECE ===
- Sir Carlyle Glean, B.Ed, MA: governor-general of Grenada

=== Sports ===
==== Olympians ====
- Allison Beveridge: Olympic bronze medalist, cycling
- Arne Dankers: Olympic silver medalist
- Kristina Groves: Olympic silver medalist in speed skating
- Jan Hudec: Olympic bronze medalist, 2014 Sochi, alpine skiing
- Kirsti Lay: Olympic bronze medalist, cycling
- Chris le Bihan: Olympic bronze medalist
- Christine Nesbitt: Olympic gold medalist
- Mark Tewksbury: Olympic gold medalist, swimming
- Hayley Wickenheiser: Olympic gold medalist, ice hockey
- Erica Wiebe: Olympic gold medalist

==== Other ====
- Sukh Chungh: Canadian football player
- J. P. Izquierdo: Canadian football player
- Jinder Mahal (real name Yuvraj Dhesi): professional wrestler
- Kate O'Brien: Canadian track cyclist and bobsledder
- Steve Rodehutskors: Canadian football player
- Alan P. F. Sell: academic and theologian
- Greg Vavra: former Canadian Football League quarterback

== Faculty ==
Faculty are listed by their academic department.

=== Law ===
- Ian Brodie: former advisor to the Canadian prime minister, strategic advisor to the Inter-American Development Bank

=== Classics and religion ===
- Carolyn Muessig: chair of Christian Thought; medievalist specializing in sermon literature, female education, and hagiography

=== Economics ===
- Herb Emery: former Svare Professor in Health Economics, full professor in Economics, research director for the School of Public Policy

=== Engineering ===
- Dr. Laleh Behjat: professor of Engineering, NSERC Chair for Women in Science and Engineering (Prairies Region)

=== English ===
- Susan Bennett: fellow of the Royal Society of Canada

=== History ===
- David Bercuson: member of the Calgary School

=== Mathematics ===
- Károly Bezdek: Canada Research Chair and director of the Centre for Computational and Discrete Geometry in the Faculty of Science
- Richard K. Guy: combinatorial game theorist, discovered unistable polyhedron with John Horton Conway

=== Medicine ===
- Dr. Norman R.C. Campbell: professor of Medicine, Community Health Sciences and Physiology and Pharmacology
- Barbara Demeneix: biologist and endocrinologist, team leader in a CNRS research unit at the National Museum of Natural History
- Eldon Smith: cardiologist, advisory board chair of the Libin Cardiovascular Institute of Alberta
- Joseph Sung: former vice-chancellor of The Chinese University of Hong Kong
- Samuel Weiss: neuroscientist, Director of the Hotchkiss Brain Institute
- D. George Wyse: cardiologist and pharmacologist, Distinguished Scientist of the Heart Rhythm Society

=== Sociology ===
- Ian Brodie: former advisor to Stephen Harper

=== Political science ===
- Barry F. Cooper: member of the Calgary School
- Tom Flanagan: member of the Calgary School, advisor to Preston Manning and Stephen Harper
- Rainer Knopff: member of the Calgary School
- Ted Morton: member of the Calgary School, Alberta MLA

=== Psychology ===
- Philip E. Vernon: Ph.D. Cambridge, D.Sc. London, contributed to I.Q. theory
