= Cycling at the 2015 Pan American Games – Women's sprint =

Cycling – Women's sprint at the 2015 Pan American Games
- Venue: Milton Velodrome
- Dates: July 18–19
- Competitors: 13 from 10 nations

Medalists
Gold medal	Monique Sullivan	Canada
Silver medal	Kate O'Brien	Canada
Bronze medal	Juliana Gaviria	Colombia

The women's sprint competition of the cycling events at the 2015 Pan American Games was held on July 18 and 19 at the Milton Velodrome in Milton, Ontario.

== Schedule ==
All times are Eastern Standard Time (UTC-3).

Date	Time	Round
July 18, 2015	11:05	Qualification
July 18, 2015	12:37	Eighth finals
July 18, 2015	13:41	Repechage
July 18, 2015	18:05	Quarterfinals
July 19, 2015	11:05	Semifinals
July 19, 2015	11:47	Race For 5th-8th Places
July 19, 2015	18:05	Finals

== Results ==
=== Qualification ===
Fastest 12 riders continue to the eighth finals.

Rank	Name	Nation	Time	Notes
1	Monique Sullivan	Canada	10.992	Q, PR
2	Kate O'Brien	Canada	11.027	Q
3	Juliana Gaviria	Colombia	11.281	Q
4	Lisandra Guerra	Cuba	11.377	Q
5	Daniela Gaxiola	Mexico	11.604	Q
6	Diana García	Colombia	11.647	Q
7	Mariaesthela Vilera	Venezuela	11.849	Q
8	Frany Fong	Mexico	11.877	Q
9	Karen Cruz	El Salvador	11.887	Q
10	Maria Jimenez Galicia	Guatemala	12.268	Q
11	Deborah Coronel	Argentina	12.318	Q
12	Alice Tamirys Leite De Melo	Brazil	12.572	Q
13	Joanne Rodriguez Haconen	Guatemala	12.816	

=== Eighth finals ===
The winners of each advance to the quarterfinals, while the losers advance to the repechage

Heat	Rank	Name	Nation	Time	Notes
1	1	Monique Sullivan	Canada	12.291	Q
1	2	Alice Tamirys Leite De Melo	Brazil		R
2	1	Kate O'Brien	Canada	11.887	Q
2	2	Deborah Coronel	Argentina		R
3	1	Juliana Gaviria	Colombia	12.046	Q
3	2	Maria Jimenez Galicia	Guatemala		R
4	1	Lisandra Guerra	Cuba	12.046	Q
4	2	Karen Cruz	El Salvador		R
5	1	Daniela Gaxiola	Mexico	12.335	Q
5	2	Frany Fong	Mexico		R
6	1	Mariaesthela Vilera	Venezuela		Q
6	2	Diana García	Colombia	REL	R

=== Repechage ===
The winner of each advanced to the quarterfinals.

Heat	Rank	Name	Nation	Time	Notes
1	1	Diana García	Colombia	12.459	Q
1	2	Karen Cruz	El Salvador		
1	3	Alice Tamirys Leite De Melo	Brazil		
2	1	Frany Fong	Mexico	12.004	Q
2	2	Maria Jimenez Galicia	Guatemala		
2	3	Deborah Coronel	Argentina		

=== Quarterfinals ===
Heat	Rank	Name	Nation	Race 1	Race 2	Decide	Notes
1	1	Monique Sullivan	Canada	11.907	11.812		Q
1	2	Frany Fong	Mexico				
2	1	Kate O'Brien	Canada	11.539	11.745		Q
2	2	Diana García	Colombia				
3	1	Juliana Gaviria	Colombia	11.945	12.150		Q
3	2	Mariaesthela Vilera	Venezuela				
4	1	Daniela Gaxiola	Mexico				Q
4	2	Lisandra Guerra	Cuba	11.669	DNS	DNS	

=== Race for 5th–8th Places ===
Rank	Name	Nation	Time	Notes
5	Diana García	Colombia	11.942	
6	Mariaesthela Vilera	Venezuela		
7	Frany Fong	Mexico		
8	Lisandra Guerra	Cuba		DNS

=== Semifinals ===
Heat	Rank	Name	Nation	Race 1	Race 2	Decide	Notes
1	1	Monique Sullivan	Canada	11.704	11.290		Q
1	2	Daniela Gaxiola	Mexico				
2	1	Kate O'Brien	Canada	11.732		11.847	Q
2	2	Juliana Gaviria	Colombia		11.882		

=== Finals ===
Heat	Rank	Name	Nation	Race 1	Race 2	Decide	Notes
For Gold	1st place, gold medalist(s)	Monique Sullivan	Canada	11.687	11.416		
For Gold	2nd place, silver medalist(s)	Kate O'Brien	Canada				
For Bronze	3rd place, bronze medalist(s)	Juliana Gaviria	Colombia	11.792	11.879		
For Bronze	4	Daniela Gaxiola	Mexico				
