= Cycling at the 2012 Summer Olympics – Women's keirin =

Women's keirin at the Games of the XXX Olympiad
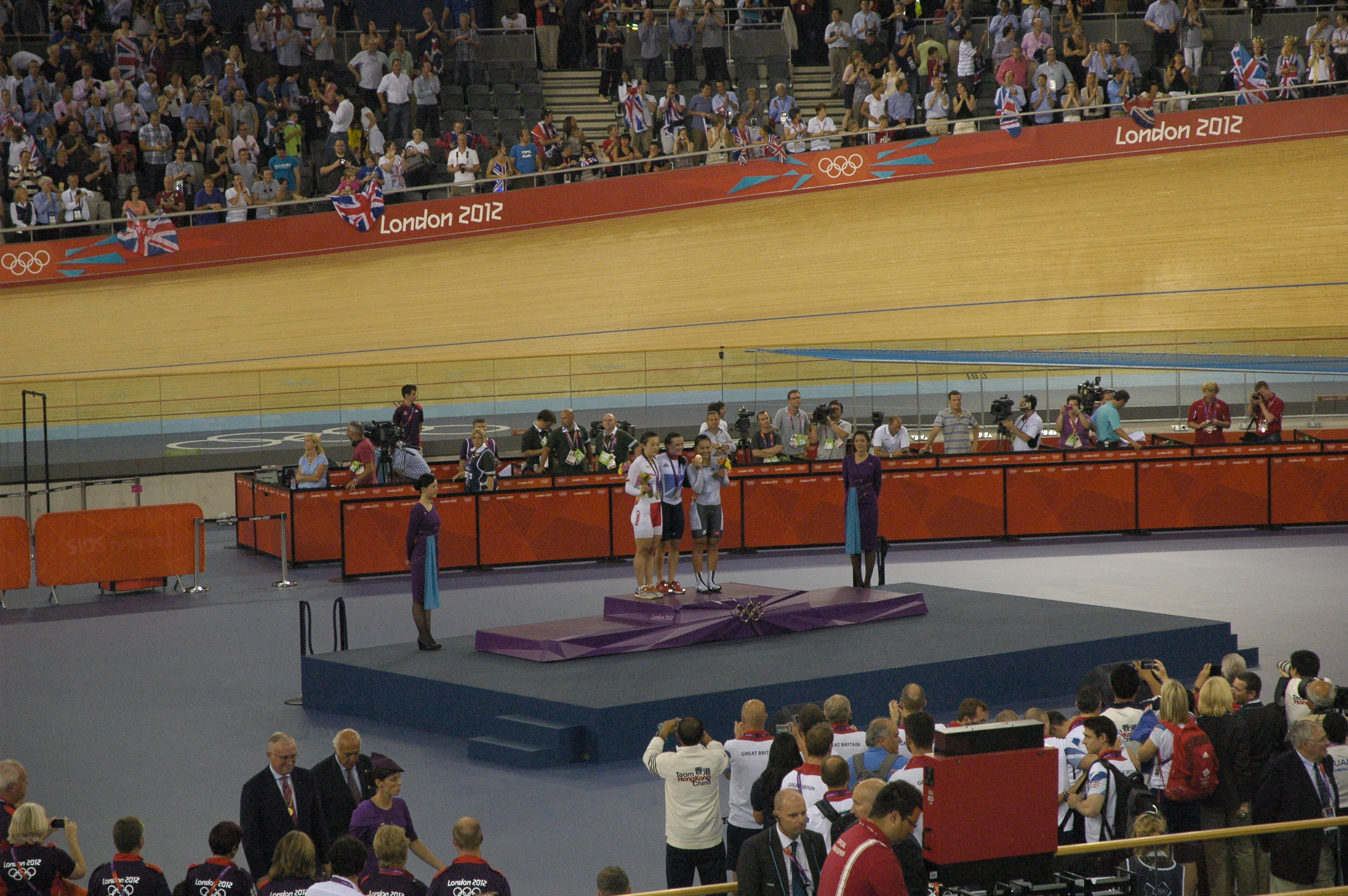
- Venue: London Velopark
- Date: 3 August
- Competitors: 18 from 18 nations

Medalists
1st place, gold medalist(s)		Victoria Pendleton	Great Britain
2nd place, silver medalist(s)		Guo Shuang	China
3rd place, bronze medalist(s)		Lee Wai Sze	Hong Kong

The women's Keirin at the 2012 Olympic Games in London took place at the London Velopark on 3 August. Women's Keirin made its debut in this Olympics.

Great Britain's Victoria Pendleton won the gold medal. Guo Shuang from China won silver and Lee Wai Sze took bronze for Hong Kong's only medal of the 2012 Games.

== Competition format ==
The Keirin races involved 5.5 laps of the track behind a motorcycle, followed by a 2.5 lap sprint to the finish. The tournament consisted of preliminary heats and repechages, a semi-finals round, and the finals. The heats and repechages narrowed the field to 12. The semi-finals divided the remaining 12 into six finalists. The finals round also included a ranking race for 7th to 12th place.

== Schedule ==
All times are British Summer Time

Date	Time	Round
Friday 3 August 2012	16:00	Round 1, repechage, round 2 and final

== Results ==
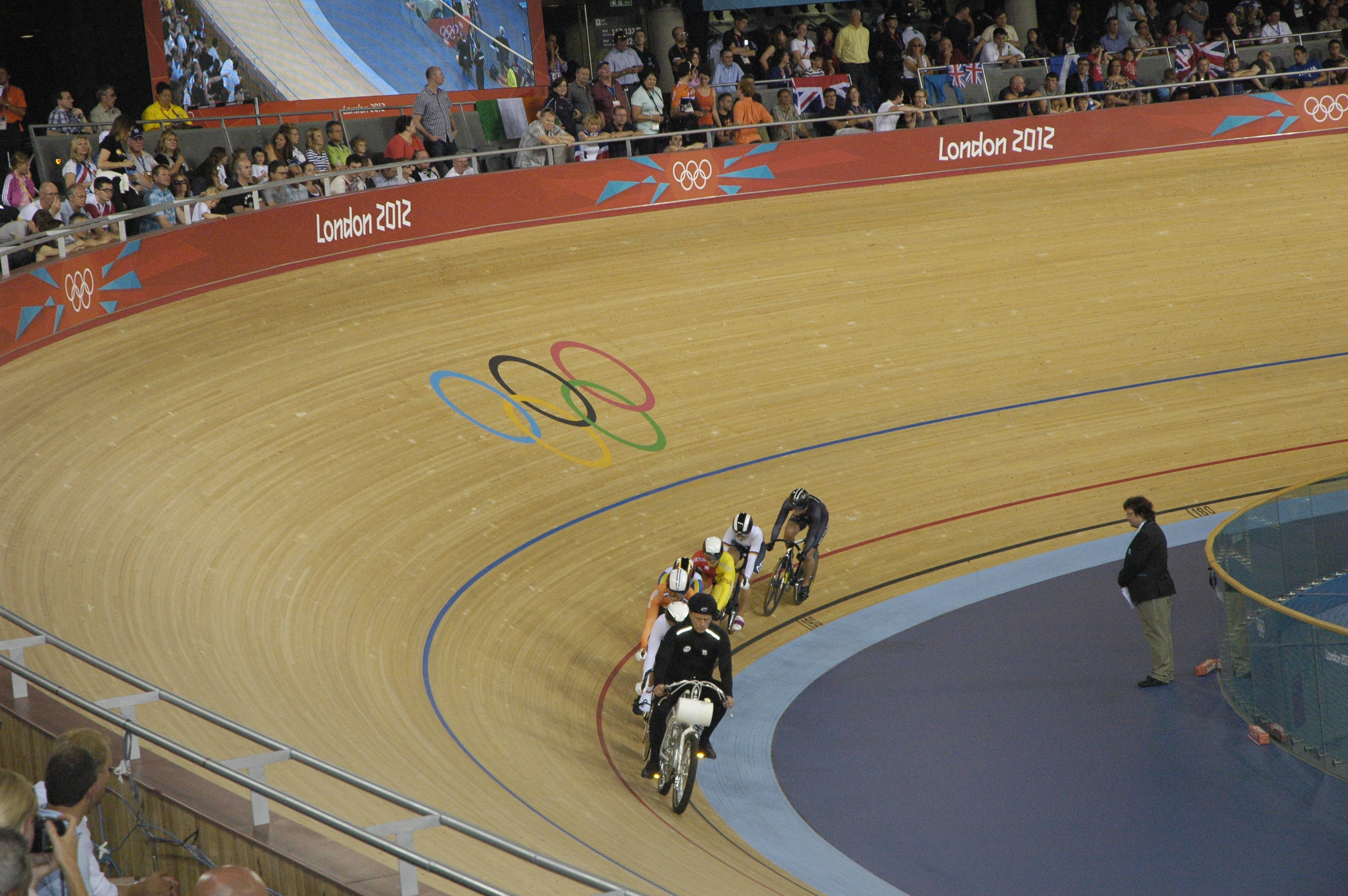

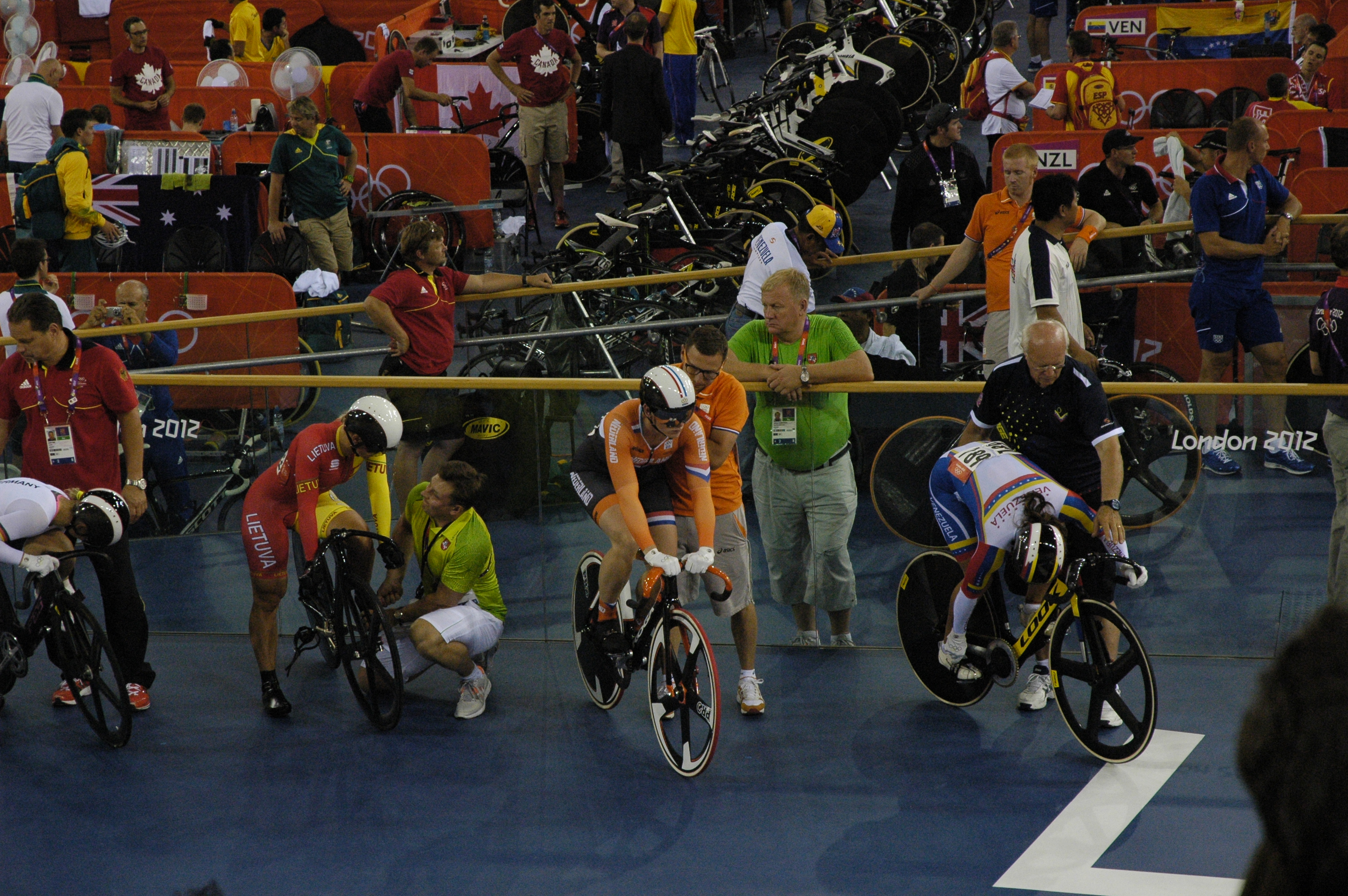
Riders before a heat

=== First round ===
==== Heat 1 ====
Rank	Rider	Country
1	Kristina Vogel	Germany
DSQ	Ekaterina Gnidenko	Russia
3	Lisandra Guerra	Cuba
4	Juliana Gaviria	Colombia
5	Monique Sullivan	Canada
6	Clara Sanchez	France

==== Heat 2 ====
Rank	Rider	Country
1	Victoria Pendleton	Great Britain
2	Anna Meares	Australia
3	Natasha Hansen	New Zealand
4	Fatehah Mustapa	Malaysia
5	Lyubov Shulika	Ukraine
6	Willy Kanis	Netherlands

==== Heat 3 ====
Rank	Rider	Country
1	Guo Shuang	China
2	Simona Krupeckaitė	Lithuania
3	Daniela Larreal	Venezuela
4	Lee Wai Sze	Hong Kong
5	Lee Hye-Jin	South Korea
6	Olga Panarina	Belarus

=== Repechages ===
==== Repechage 1 ====
Rank	Rider	Country
1	Lee Wai Sze	Hong Kong
2	Willy Kanis	Netherlands
3	Monique Sullivan	Canada
4	Lisandra Guerra	Cuba
5	Olga Panarina	Belarus
6	Juliana Gaviria	Colombia

==== Repechage 2 ====
Rank	Rider	Country
1	Clara Sanchez	France
2	Natasha Hansen	New Zealand
3	Daniela Larreal	Venezuela
4	Lyubov Shulika	Ukraine
5	Fatehah Mustapa	Malaysia
6	Lee Hye-Jin	South Korea

=== Second round ===
==== Heat 1 ====
Rank	Rider	Country
1	Anna Meares	Australia
2	Monique Sullivan	Canada
3	Lee Wai Sze	Hong Kong
4	Willy Kanis	Netherlands
5	Simona Krupeckaitė	Lithuania
6	Kristina Vogel	Germany

==== Heat 2 ====
Rank	Rider	Country
1	Victoria Pendleton	Great Britain
2	Clara Sanchez	France
3	Guo Shuang	China
DSQ	Ekaterina Gnidenko	Russia
5	Natasha Hansen	New Zealand
6	Daniela Larreal	Venezuela

==== 7th–12th final ====
Rank	Rider	Country
7	Simona Krupeckaitė	Lithuania
DSQ	Ekaterina Gnidenko	Russia
9	Daniela Larreal	Venezuela
10	Kristina Vogel	Germany
11	Natasha Hansen	New Zealand
12	Willy Kanis	Netherlands

=== Final ===
Rank	Rider	Country
1st place, gold medalist(s)	Victoria Pendleton	Great Britain
2nd place, silver medalist(s)	Guo Shuang	China
3rd place, bronze medalist(s)	Lee Wai Sze	Hong Kong
4	Clara Sanchez	France
5	Anna Meares	Australia
6	Monique Sullivan	Canada
