= Cycling at the 2012 Summer Olympics – Women's sprint =

Women's cycling sprint at the Games of the XXX Olympiad
- Venue: London Velopark
- Date: 5 to 7 August
- Competitors: 18 from 18 nations
- Winning time: 11.218/11.348

Medalists
| 1st place, gold medalist(s) | | Anna Meares | Australia |
| 2nd place, silver medalist(s) | | Victoria Pendleton | Great Britain |
| 3rd place, bronze medalist(s) | | Guo Shuang | China |

The women's cycling sprint at the 2012 Olympic Games in London took place at the London Velopark from 5 to 7 August. Anna Meares from Australia won the gold medal and Victoria Pendleton of Great Britain took silver. China's Guo Shuang won the bronze.

== Competition format ==
The sprint event was a single-elimination tournament after seeding via time trial. Each match pits two cyclists against each other in the best-of-three races. Each race consisted of three laps of the track with side-by-side starts.

== Schedule ==
All times are British Summer Time

| Date | Time | Round |
|---|---|---|
| Sunday 5 August 2012 | 11:00 & 16:00 | Qualifications / Heats |
| Monday 6 August 2012 | 16:45 | Quarter-finals |
| Tuesday 7 August 2012 | 16:00; 17:25 | Semi-finals; Final |

== Results ==
=== Qualification ===
| Rank | Rider | Time | Avg speed (km/h) |
|---|---|---|---|
| 1 | Victoria Pendleton (GBR) | 10.724 OR | 67.139 |
| 2 | Anna Meares (AUS) | 10.805 | 66.635 |
| 3 | Guo Shuang (CHN) | 11.020 | 65.335 |
| 4 | Kristina Vogel (GER) | 11.027 | 65.294 |
| 5 | Olga Panarina (BLR) | 11.080 | 64.981 |
| 6 | Lisandra Guerra (CUB) | 11.109 | 64.812 |
| 7 | Lee Wai Sze (HKG) | 11.253 | 64.268 |
| 8 | Simona Krupeckaitė (LTU) | 11.234 | 64.091 |
| 9 | Natasha Hansen (NZL) | 11.241 | 64.051 |
| 10 | Lyubov Shulika (UKR) | 11.319 | 63.609 |
| 11 | Willy Kanis (NED) | 11.322 | 63.593 |
| 12 | Monique Sullivan (CAN) | 11.347 | 63.593 |
| 13 | Juliana Gaviria (COL) | 11.376 | 63.291 |
| 14 | Lee Hye-Jin (KOR) | 11.405 | 63.130 |
| 15 | Virginie Cueff (FRA) | 11.439 | 62.942 |
| 16 | Daniela Larreal (VEN) | 11.569 | 62.235 |
| 17 | Kayono Maeda (JPN) | 11.600 | 62.068 |
| 18 | Ekaterina Gnidenko (RUS) | DSQ | DSQ |

=== First round ===
Match 1

| Name | Time | Avg speed (km/h) |
|---|---|---|
| Victoria Pendleton (GBR) | 11.775 | 61.146 |
| Ekaterina Gnidenko (RUS) | | |

Match 3

| Name | Time | Avg speed (km/h) |
|---|---|---|
| Guo Shuang (CHN) | 11.371 | 63.318 |
| Daniela Larreal (VEN) | | |

Match 5

| Name | Time | Avg speed (km/h) |
|---|---|---|
| Olga Panarina (BLR) | 11.608 | 62.026 |
| Lee Hye-Jin (KOR) | | |

Match 7

| Name | Time | Avg speed (km/h) |
|---|---|---|
| Lee Wai Sze (HKG) | 11.300 | 63.716 |
| Monique Sullivan (CAN) | | |

Match 9

| Name | Time | Avg speed (km/h) |
|---|---|---|
| Natasha Hansen (NZL) | | |
| Lyubov Shulika (UKR) | 11.808 | 60.975 |

Match 2

| Name | Time | Avg speed (km/h) |
|---|---|---|
| Anna Meares (AUS) | 11.800 | 61.016 |
| Kayono Maeda (JPN) | | |

Match 4

| Name | Time | Avg speed (km/h) |
|---|---|---|
| Kristina Vogel (GER) | 11.605 | 62.042 |
| Virginie Cueff (FRA) | | |

Match 6

| Name | Time | Avg speed (km/h) |
|---|---|---|
| Lisandra Guerra (CUB) | 11.390 | 63.213 |
| Juliana Gaviria (COL) | | |

Match 8

| Name | Time | Avg speed (km/h) |
|---|---|---|
| Simona Krupeckaitė (LTU) | 11.528 | 62.456 |
| Willy Kanis (NED) | | |

=== First round repechage ===
Match 1

| Name | Time | Avg speed (km/h) |
|---|---|---|
| Natasha Hansen (NZL) | 11.882 | 60.595 |
| Juliana Gaviria (COL) | | |
| Ekaterina Gnidenko (RUS) | | |

Match 2

| Name | Time | Avg speed (km/h) |
|---|---|---|
| Monique Sullivan (CAN) | 11.572 | 62.219 |
| Lee Hye-Jin (KOR) | | |
| Kayono Maeda (JPN) | | |

Match 3

| Name | Time | Avg speed (km/h) |
|---|---|---|
| Willy Kanis (NED) | 11.643 | 61.839 |
| Virginie Cueff (FRA) | | |
| Daniela Larreal (VEN) | | |

=== Second round ===
Match 1

| Name | Time | Avg speed (km/h) |
|---|---|---|
| Victoria Pendleton (GBR) | 11.840 | 60.810 |
| Willy Kanis (NED) | | |

Match 3

| Name | Time | Avg speed (km/h) |
|---|---|---|
| Guo Shuang (CHN) | 11.431 | 62.986 |
| Natasha Hansen (NZL) | | |

Match 5

| Name | Time | Avg speed (km/h) |
|---|---|---|
| Olga Panarina (BLR) | | |
| Simona Krupeckaitė (LTU) | 11.486 | 62.685 |

Match 2

| Name | Time | Avg speed (km/h) |
|---|---|---|
| Anna Meares (AUS) | 11.566 | 62.251 |
| Monique Sullivan (CAN) | | |

Match 4

| Name | Time | Avg speed (km/h) |
|---|---|---|
| Kristina Vogel (GER) | 11.547 | 62.353 |
| Lyubov Shulika (UKR) | | |

Match 6

| Name | Time | Avg speed (km/h) |
|---|---|---|
| Lisandra Guerra (CUB) | 11.485 | 62.690 |
| Lee Wai Sze (HKG) | | |

=== Second round repechage ===
Match 1

| Name | Time | Avg speed (km/h) |
|---|---|---|
| Lyubov Shulika (UKR) | 11.461 | 62.821 |
| Willy Kanis (NED) | | |
| Lee Wai Sze (HKG) | | |

Match 2

| Name | Time | Avg speed (km/h) |
|---|---|---|
| Olga Panarina (BLR) | 11.443 | 62.920 |
| Monique Sullivan (CAN) | | |
| Natasha Hansen (NZL) | | |

=== 9th–12th place classifications ===
| Name | Time | Avg speed (km/h) | Rank |
|---|---|---|---|
| Willy Kanis (NED) | 11.852 | 60.749 | 9 |
| Lee Wai Sze (HKG) | | | 10 |
| Monique Sullivan (CAN) | | | 11 |
| Natasha Hansen (NZL) | | | 12 |

=== Quarter-finals ===
Match 1

| Name | Race 1 | Race 2 |
|---|---|---|
| Victoria Pendleton (GBR) | 11.226 | 11.339 |
| Olga Panarina (BLR) | | |

Match 3

| Name | Race 1 | Race 2 | Decider |
|---|---|---|---|
| Guo Shuang (CHN) | | 11.283 | 11.337 |
| Lisandra Guerra (CUB) | 11.536 | | |

Match 2

| Name | Race 1 | Race 2 |
|---|---|---|
| Anna Meares (AUS) | 11.465 | 11.573 |
| Lyubov Shulika (UKR) | | |

Match 4

| Name | Race 1 | Race 2 |
|---|---|---|
| Kristina Vogel (GER) | 11.541 | 11.568 |
| Simona Krupeckaitė (LTU) | | |

=== 5th–8th place classifications ===
| Name | Time | Avg speed (km/h) | Rank |
|---|---|---|---|
| Simona Krupeckaitė (LTU) | 11.812 | 60.954 | 5 |
| Lisandra Guerra (CUB) | | | 6 |
| Lyubov Shulika (UKR) | | | 7 |
| Olga Panarina (BLR) | | | 8 |

=== Semi-finals ===
Match 1

| Name | Race 1 | Race 2 |
|---|---|---|
| Victoria Pendleton (GBR) | 11.481 | 11.538 |
| Kristina Vogel (GER) | | |

Match 2

| Name | Race 1 | Race 2 |
|---|---|---|
| Anna Meares (AUS) | 11.683 | 11.284 |
| Guo Shuang (CHN) | | |

=== Finals ===
Bronze medal match

| Name | Race 1 | Race 2 | Rank |
|---|---|---|---|
| Kristina Vogel (GER) | | | 4 |
| Guo Shuang (CHN) | 11.532 | 11.591 | 3rd place, bronze medalist(s) |

Gold medal match

| Name | Race 1 | Race 2 | Rank |
|---|---|---|---|
| Victoria Pendleton (GBR) | REL | | 2nd place, silver medalist(s) |
| Anna Meares (AUS) | 11.218 | 11.348 | 1st place, gold medalist(s) |
