= Cycling at the 2015 Pan American Games – Women's team sprint =

Cycling – Women's team sprint at the 2015 Pan American Games
- Venue: Milton Velodrome
- Dates: July 16
- Competitors: 14 from 7 nations
- Winning Time Gold Medal Race: 33.959

Medalists
Gold medal	Kate O'Brien; Monique Sullivan	Canada
Silver medal	Lisandra Guerra; Marlies Mejías	Cuba
Bronze medal	Diana García; Juliana Gaviria	Colombia

The women's team sprint competition of the cycling events at the 2015 Pan American Games was held on July 16 at the Milton Velodrome in Milton, Ontario.

== Schedule ==
All times are Eastern Standard Time (UTC−3).

Date	Time	Round
July 16, 2015	12:30	Qualifying
July 16, 2015	18:53	Final

== Results ==
=== Qualification ===
Rank	Nation	Name	Time	Notes
1	Canada	Kate O'Brien; Monique Sullivan	33.584	Q, PR
2	Cuba	Lisandra Guerra; Marlies Mejías	34.414	Q
3	Colombia	Diana García; Juliana Gaviria	34.592	Q
4	Mexico	Frany Fong; Daniela Gaxiola	34.902	Q
5	Venezuela	Angie González; Mariaesthela Vilera	35.318	
6	Argentina	Deborah Coronel; Cristina Irma Greve	36.921	
7	Guatemala	Maria Jimenez Galicia; Joanne Rodriguez Haconen	37.552	

=== Finals ===
==== Bronze Medal Race ====
Rank	Nation	Name	Time	Notes
3rd place, bronze medalist(s)	Colombia	Diana García; Juliana Gaviria	34.663	
4	Mexico	Frany Fong; Daniela Gaxiola	35.254	

==== Gold Medal Race ====
Rank	Nation	Name	Time	Notes
1st place, gold medalist(s)	Canada	Kate O'Brien; Monique Sullivan	33.959	
2nd place, silver medalist(s)	Cuba	Lisandra Guerra; Marlies Mejías	34.813	
