= Juliana Gaviria =

Colombian track cyclist

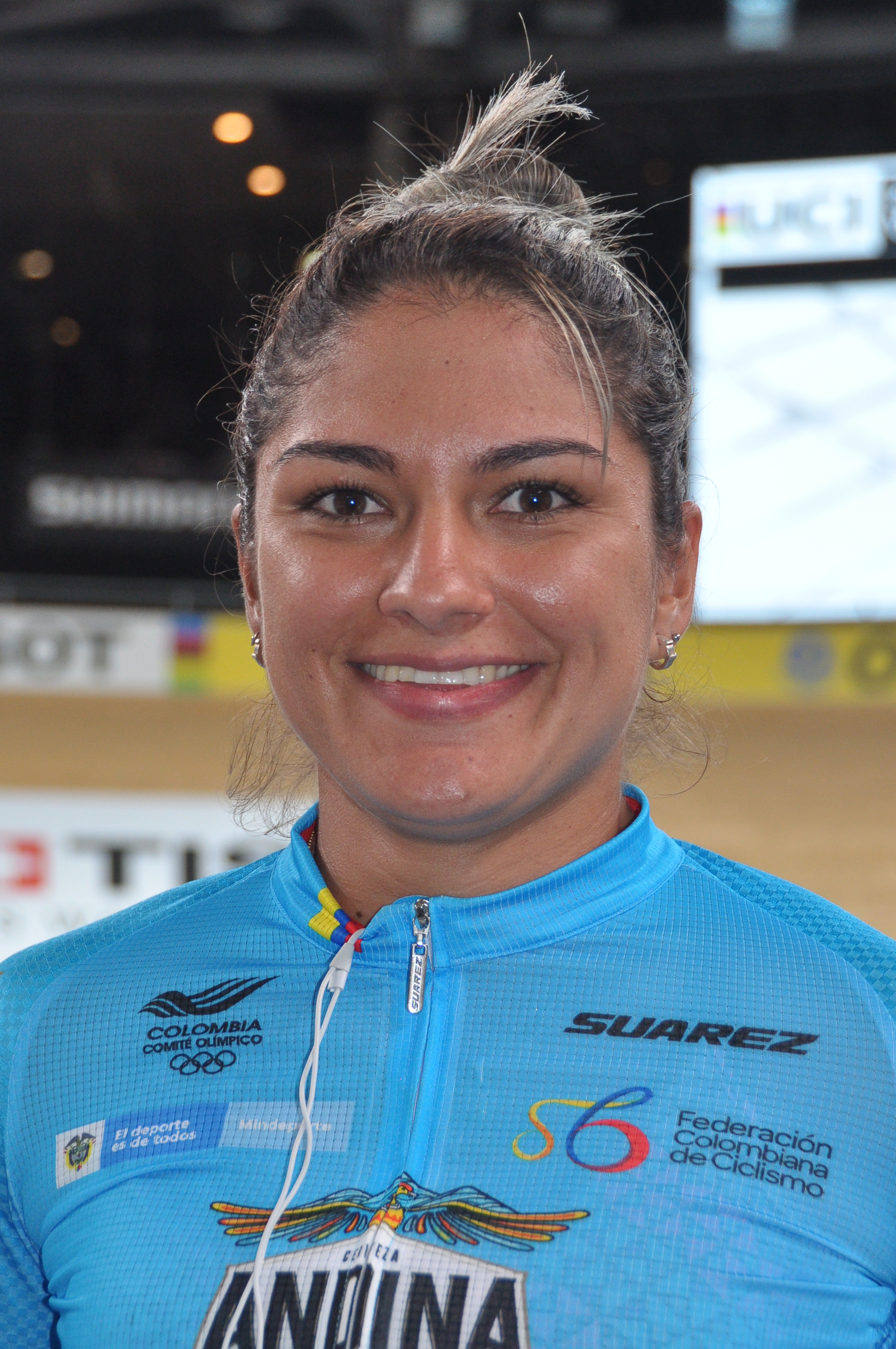
- Gaviria in 2020

Personal information
- Full name: Juliana Gaviria Rendon
- Born: 31 March 1991 (age 35) La Ceja, Antioquia, Colombia
- Height: 1.65 m (5 ft 5 in)
- Weight: 58 kg (128 lb)

Cycling career
- Sport: Cycling
- Current team: Colombia
- Discipline: Track cycling
- Role: Rider
- Rider type: Sprinter
Medal record
Representing Colombia
Women's track cycling
Event	1st	2nd	3rd
Nations Cup	1	0	0
Nations Cup stage	2	0	1
Pan American Games	0	1	4
Pan American Championships	4	14	9
CAC Games	0	2	1
South American Games	4	3	1
Bolivarian Games	6	1	1
Total	17	21	17
Nations Cup
Gold medal – first place	2021	Team sprint
Pan American Games
Silver medal – second place	2011 Guadalajara	Team sprint
Bronze medal – third place	2015 Toronto	Keirin
Bronze medal – third place	2015 Toronto	Sprint
Bronze medal – third place	2015 Toronto	Team sprint
Bronze medal – third place	2019 Lima	Team sprint
Pan American Championships
Gold medal – first place	2011 Medellín	Team sprint
Gold medal – first place	2013 Mexico City	Team sprint
Gold medal – first place	2014 Aguascalientes	Team sprint
Gold medal – first place	2021 Lima	Team sprint
Silver medal – second place	2010 Aguascalientes	Team sprint
Silver medal – second place	2011 Medellín	500 m time trial
Silver medal – second place	2012 Mar del Plata	500 m time trial
Silver medal – second place	2013 Mexico City	Keirin
Silver medal – second place	2013 Mexico City	Sprint
Silver medal – second place	2013 Mexico City	500 m time trial
Silver medal – second place	2014 Aguascalientes	500 m time trial
Silver medal – second place	2015 Santiago	Sprint
Silver medal – second place	2015 Santiago	500 m time trial
Silver medal – second place	2015 Santiago	Team sprint
Silver medal – second place	2016 Aguascalientes	Keirin
Silver medal – second place	2016 Aguascalientes	Team sprint
Silver medal – second place	2025 Asunción	Team sprint
Silver medal – second place	2026 Santiago	Team sprint
Bronze medal – third place	2012 Mar del Plata	Team sprint
Bronze medal – third place	2016 Aguascalientes	500 m time trial
Bronze medal – third place	2019 Cochabamba	Team sprint
Bronze medal – third place	2021 Lima	Keirin
Bronze medal – third place	2021 Lima	Sprint
Bronze medal – third place	2022 Lima	Keirin
Bronze medal – third place	2022 Lima	500 m time trial
Bronze medal – third place	2022 Lima	Team sprint
Bronze medal – third place	2025 Asunción	1 km time trial
Central American and Caribbean Games
Silver medal – second place	2010 Mayagüez	Team sprint
Silver medal – second place	2026 Santo Domingo	Team sprint
Bronze medal – third place	2010 Mayagüez	Sprint
South American Games
Gold medal – first place	2014 Santiago	Keirin
Gold medal – first place	2022 Asunción	Sprint
Gold medal – first place	2022 Asunción	Team sprint
Gold medal – first place	2026 Santa Fe	Team sprint
Silver medal – second place	2014 Santiago	Sprint
Silver medal – second place	2014 Santiago	Team sprint
Silver medal – second place	2022 Asunción	Keirin
Bronze medal – third place	2026 Santa Fe	Keirin
Bolivarian Games
Gold medal – first place	2013 Trujillo	Keirin
Gold medal – first place	2013 Trujillo	Sprint
Gold medal – first place	2013 Trujillo	500 m time trial
Gold medal – first place	2013 Trujillo	Team sprint
Gold medal – first place	2022 Valledupar	Team sprint
Gold medal – first place	2025 Lima-Ayacucho	Team sprint
Silver medal – second place	2022 Valledupar	Keirin
Bronze medal – third place	2025 Lima-Ayacucho	Keirin

Juliana Gaviria Rendon (born 31 March 1991) is a Colombian track cyclist, born in La Ceja. At the 2012 Summer Olympics, she competed in the Women's team sprint, women's keirin, and Women's sprint. She also competed in the women's sprint at the 2016 Summer Olympics. She is the elder sister of track and road cyclist Fernando Gaviria. She is married to fellow track cyclist Fabián Puerta.

== Major results ==
2011
Pan American Road and Track Championships

2nd Team sprint (with Martha Bayona)

2012
Pan American Road and Track Championships

2nd 500m time trial
3rd Team sprint (with Diana García)

Track Cycling World Cup

1st Keirin, Round 1, Cali
3rd Team sprint, Round 1, Cali (with Martha Bayona)

2013
Pan American Road and Track Championships

1st Team Sprint (with Martha Bayona)
2nd 500 metre time trial
2nd Sprint
2nd Keirin

1st Sprint, Los Angeles Grand Prix
Copa Cobernador de Carabobo

3rd Sprint
3rd Keirin

2014
Pan American Track Championships

1st Team Sprint (with Diana Maria Garcia Orrego)
2nd 500m Time Trial

South American Games

1st Keirin
2nd Sprint
2nd Team Sprint (with Diana Maria Garcia Orrego)

2015
Copa Cuba de Pista

1st Sprint
1st Team Sprint (with Diana Maria Garcia Orrego)
1st 500m Time Trial
3rd Keirin

Pan American Track Championships

2nd Sprint
2nd Team Sprint (with Martha Bayona
2nd 500m Time Trial

Pan American Games

3rd Keirin
3rd Sprint
3rd Team Sprint (with Diana Maria Garcia Orrego)

2016
Pan American Track Championships

2nd Keirin
2nd Team Sprint (with Martha Bayona
3rd 500m Time Trial

3rd Team Sprint, GP von Deutschland im Sprint (with Martha Bayona)
