= Venezuela at the 2012 Summer Olympics =

- IOC code: VEN
- NOC: Venezuelan Olympic Committee
- Website: cov.com.ve (in Spanish)

in London
- Competitors: 69 in 15 sports
- Flag bearers: Fabiola Ramos (opening); Jessica López (closing)
- Medals Ranked 50th: Gold 1 Silver 0 Bronze 0 Total 1

Summer Olympics appearances (overview)
- 1948; 1952; 1956; 1960; 1964; 1968; 1972; 1976; 1980; 1984; 1988; 1992; 1996; 2000; 2004; 2008; 2012; 2016; 2020; 2024; 2028

Venezuela competed at the 2012 Summer Olympics in London, from July 27 to August 12, 2012. This was the nation's seventeenth consecutive appearance at the Olympics, since its debut at the same host city in 1948. Celebrating the anniversary of the nation's Olympic debut, the British Embassy in Caracas invited former track cyclist Julio César León to travel back to the United Kingdom, and revisit his memories as the first Venezuelan athlete in history to compete at the games.

With the absence of baseball and softball at the Olympics, the Venezuelan Olympic Committee (Spanish: Comité Olímpico Venezolano, COV) sent the nation's second-largest delegation to the Games. A total of 69 athletes, 43 men and 29 women, competed in 15 sports. There was only a single competitor in artistic gymnastics, shooting, and table tennis. Among the sports, Venezuela marked its Olympic debut in beach volleyball.

Notable Venezuelan athletes included sisters Andreína and Yanel Pinto in freestyle and open water swimming, all-around gymnast Jessica López, and track cyclist Daniela Larreal, who made her Olympic comeback in London after an eight-year absence. Table tennis player Fabiola Ramos, who competed at her fifth Olympics, was the most experienced athlete and became Venezuela's second consecutive flag bearer at the opening ceremony, and the fourth in Olympic history.

Venezuela left London with its first gold medal since 1968, and its second in Olympic history. It was awarded to fencer Rubén Limardo, who won the men's individual épée.

== Medalists ==
Medal	Name	Sport	Event	Date
Gold	Rubén Limardo	Fencing	Men's individual épée	1 August

Medals by sport
Sport	1st place, gold medalist(s)	2nd place, silver medalist(s)	3rd place, bronze medalist(s)	Total
Fencing	1	0	0	1
Total	1	0	0	1

== Competitors ==
Sport	Men	Women	Total
Archery	1	1	2
Athletics	8	5	13
Boxing	2	1	3
Cycling	7	5	12
Diving	2	1	3
Fencing	3	3	6
Gymnastics	0	1	1
Judo	2	1	3
Sailing	2	0	2
Shooting	0	1	1
Swimming	7	3	10
Table tennis	1	0	1
Volleyball	2	0	2
Weightlifting	1	2	3
Wrestling	5	2	7
Total	43	26	69

== Archery ==
Venezuela qualified two archers.

Athlete	Event	Ranking round		Round of 64	Round of 32	Round of 16	Quarterfinals	Semifinals	Final / BM	
Athlete	Event	Score	Seed	Opposition Score	Opposition Score	Opposition Score	Opposition Score	Opposition Score	Opposition Score	Rank
Elías Malavé	Men's individual	666	25	Kuo C-w (TPE) (39); L 5–6	Did not advance					
Leidys Brito	Women's individual	634	45	Cheng M (CHN) (20); L 4–6	Did not advance					

== Athletics ==
Venezuelan athletes have so far achieved qualifying standards in the following athletics events (up to a maximum of 3 athletes in each event at the 'A' Standard, and 1 at the 'B' Standard)):

Key

- Note–Ranks given for track events are within the athlete's heat only
- Q = Qualified for the next round
- q = Qualified for the next round as a fastest loser or, in field events, by position without achieving the qualifying target
- NR = National record
- N/A = Round not applicable for the event
- Bye = Athlete not required to compete in round

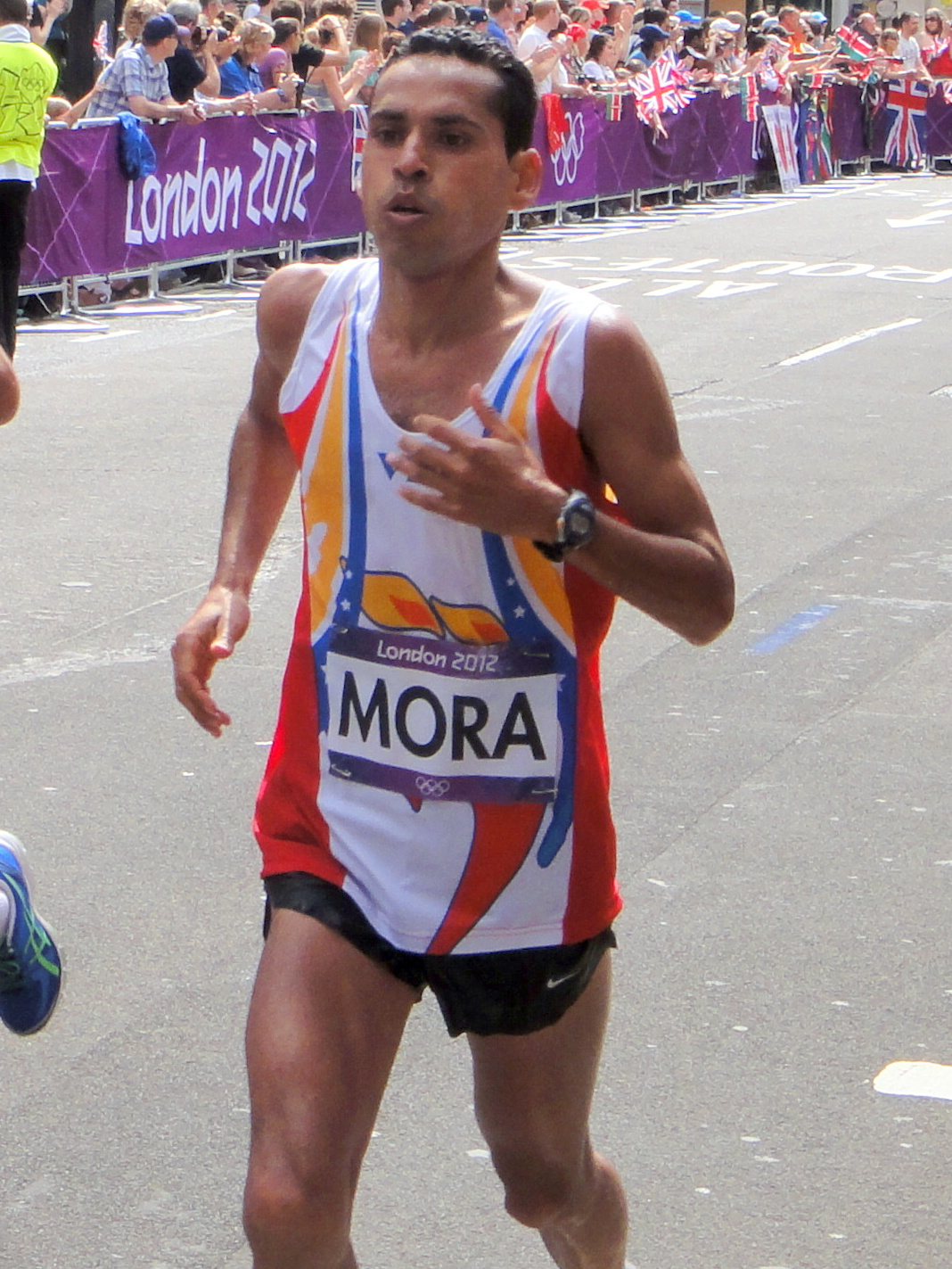
Pedro Mora finished sixty-second in men's marathon.

Men
Track and road events

Athlete	Event	Heat		Semifinal		Final	
Athlete	Event	Result	Rank	Result	Rank	Result	Rank
Albert Bravo	400 m	45.61	5 q	46.22	7	Did not advance	
Pedro Mora	Marathon	—N/a				2:22.40	62
José Peña	3000 m steeplechase	8:24.06	8	—N/a		Did not advance	
Edward Villanueva	1500 m	3:43.11	11	Did not advance			
Albert Bravo; Omar Longart; José Meléndez; Alberto Aguilar; Arturo Ramírez	4 × 400 m relay	3:02.62	4 q	—N/a		3:02.18	7

Women
Track and road events

Athlete	Event	Heat		Semifinal		Final	
Athlete	Event	Result	Rank	Result	Rank	Result	Rank
Yolimar Pineda	Marathon	—N/a				2:45:16	94
Milángela Rosales	20 km walk	—N/a				1:42:46	55
Nercelis Soto	200 m	23.54	8	Did not advance			

Field events

Athlete	Event	Qualification		Final	
Athlete	Event	Distance	Position	Distance	Position
Yusbely Parra	Javelin throw	DNS		Did not advance	
Rosa Rodríguez	Hammer throw	67.34	27	Did not advance	

== Boxing ==
Venezuela has qualified boxers for the following events

Men

Athlete	Event	Round of 32	Round of 16	Quarterfinals	Semifinals	Final	
Athlete	Event	Opposition Result	Opposition Result	Opposition Result	Opposition Result	Opposition Result	Rank
Gabriel Maestre	Welterweight	Ghasemipour (IRI); W 13–8	Lusizi (RSA); W 18–13	Sapiyev (KAZ); L 9–20	Did not advance		
José Espinoza	Middleweight	Harcsa (HUN); L 13–16	Did not advance				

Women

Athlete	Event	Round of 16	Quarterfinals	Semifinals	Final	
Athlete	Event	Opposition Result	Opposition Result	Opposition Result	Opposition Result	Rank
Karlha Magliocco	Flyweight	Matos (BRA); W 15–14	Esparza (USA); L 16–24	Did not advance		

== Cycling ==
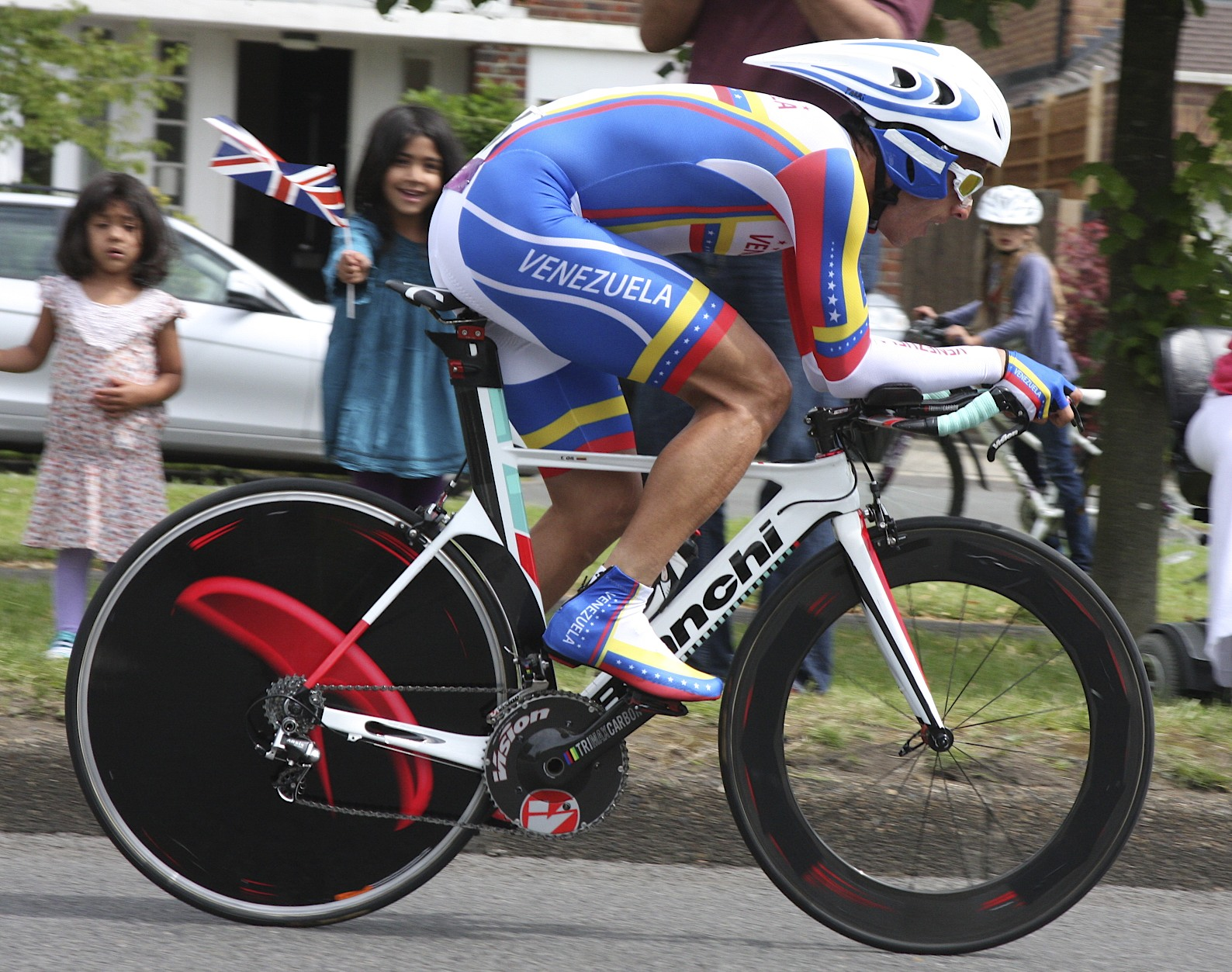
Tomás Gil finished thirty third in men's time trial.

Venezuela has qualified in the following events

=== Road ===
Athlete	Event	Time	Rank
Tomás Gil	Men's road race	5:46:37	70
Tomás Gil	Men's time trial	57:05.12	33
Jackson Rodríguez	Men's road race	5:46:37	51
Miguel Ubeto	Men's road race	5:46:37	45
Danielys García	Women's road race	Did not finish	

=== Track ===
Sprint

Athlete	Event	Qualification		Round 1	Repechage 1	Round 2	Repechage 2	Quarterfinals	Semifinals	Final	
Athlete	Event	Time Speed (km/h)	Rank	Opposition Time Speed (km/h)	Opposition Time Speed (km/h)	Opposition Time Speed (km/h)	Opposition Time Speed (km/h)	Opposition Time Speed (km/h)	Opposition Time Speed (km/h)	Opposition Time Speed (km/h)	Rank
Hersony Canelón	Men's sprint	10.123; 71.125	6	Kelemen (CZE); L REL	Dawkins (NZL); W 10.439; 68.972	Perkins (AUS); L REL	Nakagawa (JPN); Awang (MAS); L	Did not advance		9th place final Nakagawa (JPN); Kelemen (CZE); Esterhuizen (RSA); L	12
Daniela Larreal	Women's sprint	11.569; 62.235	16	Guo S (CHN); L	Kanis (NED); Cueff (FRA); L	Did not advance					

Team sprint

Athlete	Event	Qualification		Semifinals		Final	
Athlete	Event	Time Speed (km/h)	Rank	Opposition Time Speed (km/h)	Rank	Opposition Time Speed (km/h)	Rank
Hersony Canelón; César Marcano; Ángel Pulgar	Men's team sprint	44.654; 60.464	9	Did not advance			
Daniela Larreal; María Estela Vilera	Women's team sprint	34.320; 52.447	8 Q	China; L 34.415; 52.302	7	Did not advance	

Keirin

Athlete	Event	1st Round	Repechage	2nd Round	Final
Athlete	Event	Rank	Rank	Rank	Rank
Hersony Canelón	Men's keirin	3 R	2 Q	5	12
Daniela Larreal	Women's keirin	3 R	3 Q	6	9

Omnium

Athlete	Event	Flying lap		Points race		Elimination race	Individual pursuit		Scratch race	Time trial		Total points	Rank
Athlete	Event	Time	Rank	Points	Rank	Rank	Time	Rank	Rank	Time	Rank	Total points	Rank
Carlos Linares	Men's omnium	13.863	16	−18	16	14	4:36.477	16	18	1:06.773	16	96	17
Angie González	Women's omnium	15.115	17	20	9	18	3:54.926	17	17	37.578	17	95	18

=== BMX ===
Athlete	Event	Seeding		Semifinal		Final	
Athlete	Event	Result	Rank	Points	Rank	Result	Rank
Stefany Hernández	Women's BMX	41.253	12	15	5	Did not advance	

== Diving ==
Venezuela has qualified in the following events.

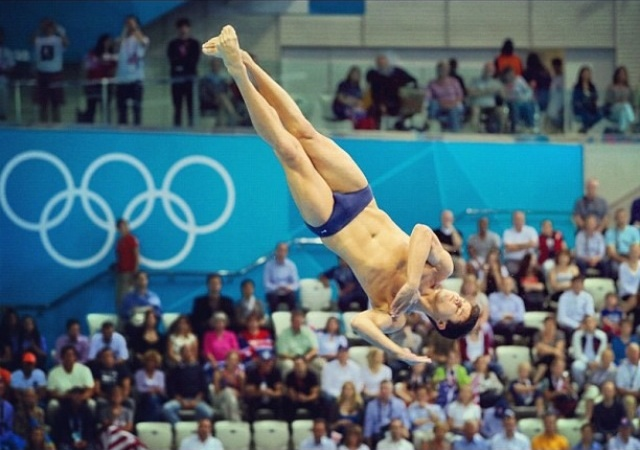
Edickson Contreras.

Men

Athlete	Event	Preliminaries		Semifinals		Final	
Athlete	Event	Points	Rank	Points	Rank	Points	Rank
Edickson Contreras	3 m springboard	301.45	28	Did not advance			
Robert Páez	3 m springboard	382.60	25	Did not advance			

Women

Athlete	Event	Preliminaries		Semifinals		Final	
Athlete	Event	Points	Rank	Points	Rank	Points	Rank
Jocelyn Castillo	3 m springboard	266.00	23	Did not advance			

== Fencing ==
Venezuela qualified 6 fencers.

Men

Athlete	Event	Round of 64	Round of 32	Round of 16	Quarterfinal	Semifinal	Final / BM	
Athlete	Event	Opposition Score	Opposition Score	Opposition Score	Opposition Score	Opposition Score	Opposition Score	Rank
Silvio Fernández	Individual épée	—N/a	Alexanin (KAZ); W 15–12	Kudayev (UZB); W 15–3	Kesley (USA); L 9–15	Did not advance		
Rubén Limardo	Individual épée	—N/a	Fayez (EGY); W 15–13	Heinzer (SUI); W 15-11	Pizzo (ITA); W 15–12	Kelsey (USA); W 6–5	Piasecki (NOR); W 15–10	1st place, gold medalist(s)
Hernán Jansen	Individual sabre	Samandi (TUN); W 15–13	Yakimenko (RUS); L 4–15	Did not advance				

Women

Athlete	Event	Round of 64	Round of 32	Round of 16	Quarterfinal	Semifinal	Final / BM	
Athlete	Event	Opposition Score	Opposition Score	Opposition Score	Opposition Score	Opposition Score	Opposition Score	Rank
Maria Martinez	Individual épée	Duplitzer (GER); L 10–15	Did not advance					
Johana Fuenmayor	Individual foil	El Gammal (EGY); W 15–9	Errigo (ITA); L 4–15	Did not advance				
Alejandra Benítez	Individual sabre	—N/a	Lee R-J (KOR); W 15–9	Velikaya (RUS); L 10–15	Did not advance			

== Gymnastics ==
=== Artistic ===
Women

Athlete	Event	Qualification						Final					
Athlete	Event	Apparatus				Total	Rank	Apparatus				Total	Rank
Athlete	Event	F	V	UB	BB	Total	Rank	F	V	UB	BB	Total	Rank
Jessica López	All-around	13.900	14.566	14.266	13.933	56.665	13 Q	13.800	14.800	13.900	13.000	55.500	18

== Judo ==
Venezuela has qualified 3 judokas

Athlete	Event	Round of 64	Round of 32	Round of 16	Quarterfinals	Semifinals	Repechage	Final / BM	
Athlete	Event	Opposition Result	Opposition Result	Opposition Result	Opposition Result	Opposition Result	Opposition Result	Opposition Result	Rank
Javier Guédez	Men's −60 kg	Bye	A Lamusi (CHN); W 0111–0000	Sobirov (UZB); L 0000–1000	Did not advance				
Ricardo Valderrama	Men's −66 kg	Bye	Drakšič (SLO); L 0001–0010	Did not advance					
Giovanna Blanco	Women's +78 kg	—N/a	Bye	Sugimoto (JPN); L 0000–0100	Did not advance				

== Sailing ==
Venezuela has qualified 2 boat for each of the following events

Men

Athlete	Event	Race											Net points	Final rank
Athlete	Event	1	2	3	4	5	6	7	8	9	10	M*	Net points	Final rank
Daniel Flores	RS:X	~~37~~	37	29	32	30	24	32	29	23	19	EL	252	31
Jose Miguel Ruíz	Laser	45	~~46~~	34	37	42	36	33	44	35	28	EL	333	41

M = Medal race; EL = Eliminated – did not advance into the medal race;

== Shooting ==
Women

Athlete	Event	Qualification		Final	
Athlete	Event	Points	Rank	Points	Rank
Maribel Pineda	25 m pistol	560	38	Did not advance	
Maribel Pineda	10 m air pistol	365	45	Did not advance	

== Swimming ==
Venezuelan swimmers have so far achieved qualifying standards in the following events (up to a maximum of 2 swimmers in each event at the Olympic Qualifying Time (OQT), and potentially 1 at the Olympic Selection Time (OST)

Men

Athlete	Event	Heat		Semifinal		Final	
Athlete	Event	Time	Rank	Time	Rank	Time	Rank
Alejandro Gómez	1500 m freestyle	15:27.38	23	—N/a		did not advance	
Marcos Lavado	200 m butterfly	1:59.31	27	Did not advance			
Erwin Maldonado	10 km open water	—N/a				1:50:52.9	13
Cristian Quintero	200 m freestyle	1:48.71	22	Did not advance			
Cristian Quintero	400 m freestyle	3:50.44	16	—N/a		Did not advance	
Albert Subirats	100 m butterfly	53.18	29	Did not advance			
Crox Acuña; Octavio Alesi; Alejandro Gómez; Marcos Lavado; Cristian Quintero	4 × 100 m freestyle relay	3:22.68	15	—N/a		Did not advance	

Women

Athlete	Event	Heat		Semifinal		Final	
Athlete	Event	Time	Rank	Time	Rank	Time	Rank
Andreína Pinto	400 m freestyle	4:08.45	15	—N/a		Did not advance	
Andreína Pinto	800 m freestyle	8:26.43	6 Q	—N/a		8:29.28	8
Andreína Pinto	200 m butterfly	2:11.23	22	Did not advance			
Andreína Pinto	400 m individual medley	4:48.64	27	—N/a		Did not advance	
Yanel Pinto	10 km open water	—N/a				1:59:05.8	14
Arlene Semeco	50 m freestyle	25.56	28	Did not advance			
Arlene Semeco	100 m freestyle	56.90	33	Did not advance			

== Table tennis ==
Venezuela qualified one athlete.

Athlete	Event	Preliminary round	Round 1	Round 2	Round 3	Round 4	Quarterfinals	Semifinals	Final / BM	
Athlete	Event	Opposition Result	Opposition Result	Opposition Result	Opposition Result	Opposition Result	Opposition Result	Opposition Result	Opposition Result	Rank
Fabiola Ramos	Women's singles	Bye	Tóth (HUN); L 3–4	Did not advance						

== Volleyball ==
=== Beach ===
Athlete	Event	Preliminary round	Standing	Round of 16	Quarterfinals	Semifinals	Final / BM	
Athlete	Event	Opposition Score	Standing	Opposition Score	Opposition Score	Opposition Score	Opposition Score	Rank
Igor Hernández; Jesus Villafañe	Men's	Pool E Nummerdor – Schuil (NED); L 1 – 2 (18–21, 21–17, 10–15); Pļaviņš – Šmēdiņš (LAT); L 0 – 2 (14–21, 16–21); Erdmann – Matysik (GER); L 1 – 2 (22–20, 16–21, 11–15)	4	Did not advance				19

== Weightlifting ==
Venezuela has qualified 1 man and 2 women.

Athlete	Event	Snatch		Clean & jerk		Total	Rank
Athlete	Event	Result	Rank	Result	Rank	Total	Rank
Junior Sánchez	Men's −69 kg	148	4	180	4	328	5
Betsi Rivas	Women's −48 kg	70	10	98	6	168	8
Inmara Henríquez	Women's −53 kg	81	14	113	5	194	10

== Wrestling ==
Venezuela has qualified in the following events

Key:

- VT – Victory by Fall.
- PP – Decision by Points – the loser with technical points.
- PO – Decision by Points – the loser without technical points.

Men's freestyle

Athlete	Event	Qualification	Round of 16	Quarterfinal	Semifinal	Repechage 1	Repechage 2	Final / BM	
Athlete	Event	Opposition Result	Opposition Result	Opposition Result	Opposition Result	Opposition Result	Opposition Result	Opposition Result	Rank
Ricardo Roberty	−74 kg	Midana (GBS); L 1–3 ^{PP}	Did not advance						12
José Daniel Díaz	−84 kg	Bye	Zvirbulis (LAT); L 1–3 ^{PP}	Did not advance					17

Men's Greco-Roman

Athlete	Event	Qualification	Round of 16	Quarterfinal	Semifinal	Repechage 1	Repechage 2	Final / BM	
Athlete	Event	Opposition Result	Opposition Result	Opposition Result	Opposition Result	Opposition Result	Opposition Result	Opposition Result	Rank
Luis Liendo	−60 kg	Bye	Kebispayev (KAZ); L 0–3 ^{PO}	Did not advance					12
Wuileixis Rivas	−66 kg	Bye	Guénot (FRA); L 0–3 ^{PO}	Did not advance					16
Erwin Caraballo	−96 kg	Arusaar (EST); L 0–3 ^{PO}	Did not advance						19

Women's freestyle

Athlete	Event	Qualification	Round of 16	Quarterfinal	Semifinal	Repechage 1	Repechage 2	Final / BM	
Athlete	Event	Opposition Result	Opposition Result	Opposition Result	Opposition Result	Opposition Result	Opposition Result	Opposition Result	Rank
Mayelis Caripá	−48 kg	Bye	Engelhardt (GER); W 3–1 ^{PP}	Merleni (UKR); L 0–5 ^{VT}	Did not advance				10
Marcia Andrades	−55 kg	Zholobova (RUS); L 0–3 ^{PO}	Did not advance						19
