= Jillian Cornish =

New Zealand biomedical researcher

- Born: 1950 (age 75–76)
- Education: University of Calgary
- Scientific career
- Fields: bone growth
- Workplaces: University of Auckland
- Thesis: Immunopathogenesis of an experimental autoimmune renal disease in the rat (1985)
- Website: https://unidirectory.auckland.ac.nz/profile/j-cornish

Jillian Cornish (born 1950) is a New Zealand biomedical researcher. She is currently a full professor at the University of Auckland.

== Academic career ==
After being raised in Auckland and attending Epsom Girls Grammar School and as an undergraduate at the University of Auckland, Cornish completed a 1982 MSc titled 'The Role of nephritogenic antigen in the development and maintenance of immune complex glomerulonephritis' and a 1985 PhD titled 'Immunopathogenesis of an experimental autoimmune renal disease in the rat' both at the University of Calgary. Returning to Auckland, she joined the University of Auckland and rose to full professor. Cornish is on the boards of the International Bone & Mineral Society, International Bone Morphometry Society and is a past-president of Australian and New Zealand Bone and Mineral Society.

Her research relates to cell and bone growth, investigating peptides and lipids that are anabolic to bone cells, cartilage and tendon cells. She holds over 80 patents in the area.

== Honours and awards ==
In 2014, Cornish received the Paula Stern Achievement Award from the American Society for Bone and Mineral Research In 2019, she was elected a Fellow of the Royal Society of New Zealand.

== Board memberships ==
- Osteoporosis New Zealand
- Australia and New Zealand Bone and Mineral Society
- International Society of Bone Morphometry
- International Bone & Mineral Society

== Selected works ==
- Cornish, Jillian, Karen E. Callon, Dorit Naot, Kate P. Palmano, Tatjana Banovic, Usha Bava, Maureen Watson et al. "Lactoferrin is a potent regulator of bone cell activity and increases bone formation in vivo." Endocrinology 145, no. 9 (2004): 4366–4374.
- Cundy, Tim, Madhuri Hegde, Dorit Naot, Belinda Chong, Alan King, Robyn Wallace, John Mulley et al. "A mutation in the gene TNFRSF11B encoding osteoprotegerin causes an idiopathic hyperphosphatasia phenotype." Human Molecular Genetics 11, no. 18 (2002): 2119–2127.
- Williams, Garry A., Yu Wang, Karen E. Callon, Maureen Watson, Jian-ming Lin, Janice BB Lam, Jessica L. Costa et al. "In vitro and in vivo effects of adiponectin on bone." Endocrinology 150, no. 8 (2009): 3603–3610.
- Naot, Dorit, Andrew Grey, Ian R. Reid, and Jillian Cornish. "Lactoferrin–a novel bone growth factor." Clinical Medicine & Research 3, no. 2 (2005): 93–101.

== Patents ==
- Cornish, Jillian, Ian Reginald Reid, and Garth James Smith Cooper. "Treatment of bone disorders with adrenomedullin or adrenomedullin agonists." U.S. Patent 6,440,421, issued 27 August 2002.
- Reid, Ian Reginald, Jillian Cornish, Garth James Smith Cooper, and David H. Coy. "Compounds and uses thereof in treating bone disorders." U.S. Patent 6,821,954, issued 23 November 2004.
- Cornish, Jillian, Ian Reid, Kate Palmano, and Neill Haggarty. "Lactoferrin." U.S. Patent Application 10/205,960, filed 9 October 2003.
- Reid, Ian, Jillian Cornish, Neill Haggarty, and Kay Palmano. "Bone health compositions derived from milk." U.S. Patent Application 10/398,628, filed 18 March 2004.
