= Cycling at the 2012 Summer Olympics – Men's individual road race =

Men's cycling road race at the Games of the XXX Olympiad
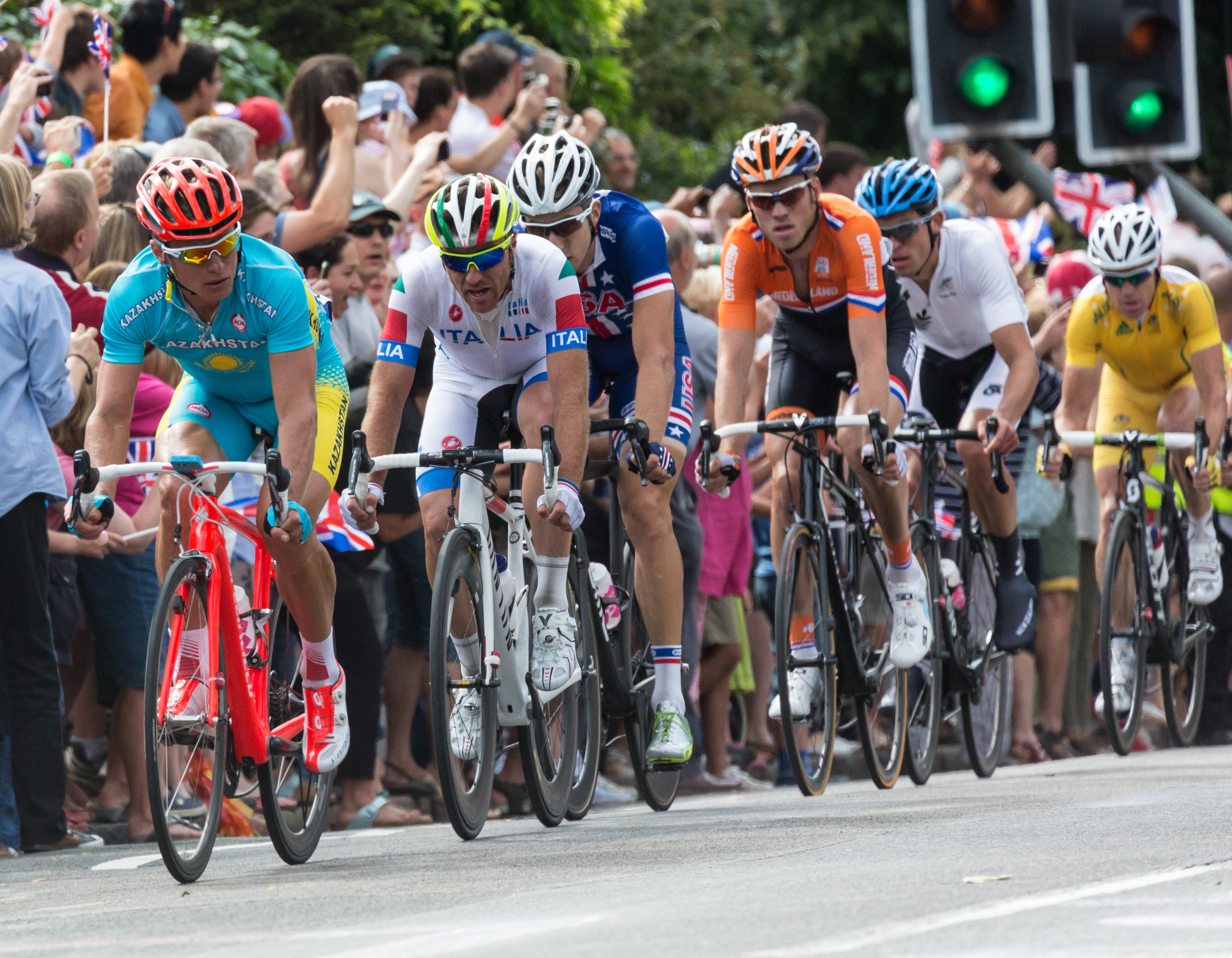
- Alexander Vinokourov leading the breakaway group in the men's road race, approximately 10 km from the finish line on The Mall.
- Venue: Central and southwest London and north Surrey; 250 km (155.3 mi)
- Date: 28 July 2012
- Competitors: 144 from 63 nations
- Winning time: 5:45:57

Medalists
1st place, gold medalist(s)		Alexander Vinokourov	Kazakhstan
2nd place, silver medalist(s)		Rigoberto Urán	Colombia
3rd place, bronze medalist(s)		Alexander Kristoff	Norway

The men's road race, one of the cycling events at the 2012 Olympic Games in London, took place on 28 July at 10 a.m. in central and southwest London and north Surrey, starting and finishing on The Mall.

This was the 19th appearance of the event at the Olympics, first held in 1896 and then at every Summer Olympics since 1936. It replaced the individual time trial event that had been held from 1912 to 1932; the time trial was re-introduced in 1996 alongside the road race.

Samuel Sánchez of Spain, who would have been the defending champion, was unable to compete due to an injury incurred at the 2012 Tour de France.

The race was won by Kazakhstan's Alexander Vinokourov. He sprinted clear of Colombia's Rigoberto Urán, who claimed the silver medal. Alexander Kristoff of Norway won the sprint from the following group to take bronze. Vinokourov was the first man (and, through the 2016 Games, only; multiple women have done so) to win multiple medals in the event; he had previously taken silver in 2000.

== Qualification ==
The top ten ranked countries in the final standings of the 2011 UCI World Tour qualified to have five riders to represent their respective country in the race. The nations with five-man squads were: Spain, Belgium, Italy, Australia, Great Britain, Germany, Netherlands, United States and Switzerland; although Luxembourg placed ninth in the rankings, their roster was reduced to two men. Of the other nations on the World Tour, France and Denmark had four riders, Norway and Ireland three, Kazakhstan two and Slovakia, Costa Rica and Latvia one rider each. The top six countries on the UCI Europe Tour – Slovenia, Russia, Portugal, Poland, Turkey and Belarus – in addition to Colombia, Venezuela, Brazil, the UCI America Tour top three, UCI Asia Tour leaders Iran and UCI Africa Tour leaders Morocco, had three riders. The remaining nations in the race were represented by either two or one rider. Eritrea, Georgia, and Syria competed in the event for the first time. There were a total of 144 participants.

== Pre-race favourites ==
The Belfast Telegraph columnist The Punter considered the 2011 World Road Race champion, Mark Cavendish of Great Britain to be the favourite for the race, although his chances were likely dependent on whether the race ended in a sprint finish. Cavendish was expected to be greatly assisted by his four-man British team which he labelled his 'dream team' prior to the race and regarded by Bradley Wiggins as 'possibly the strongest fielded in an Olympic road race'. The race did not go as planned as Ian Stannard, David Millar, Chris Froome, and Wiggins all finished beyond 90th place and Cavendish came across in 29th.

Tom Boonen of Belgium, Australia's Matthew Goss, André Greipel of Germany were also tipped as potential winners. Other sprinters tipped for Medals included Tour de France points classification winner Peter Sagan of Slovakia and Edvald Boasson Hagen of Norway – but both riders had perceived weaker teams than those of Great Britain, Belgium and Germany. If the race was to have ended in a sprint finish, Sagan and Boonen were tipped for victory, along with other classic specialists such as Fabian Cancellara of Switzerland, the silver medalist in 2008, and Philippe Gilbert of Belgium.

The defending champion, Samuel Sánchez of Spain, did not enter the race due to an injury suffered at the 2012 Tour de France.

== Course ==
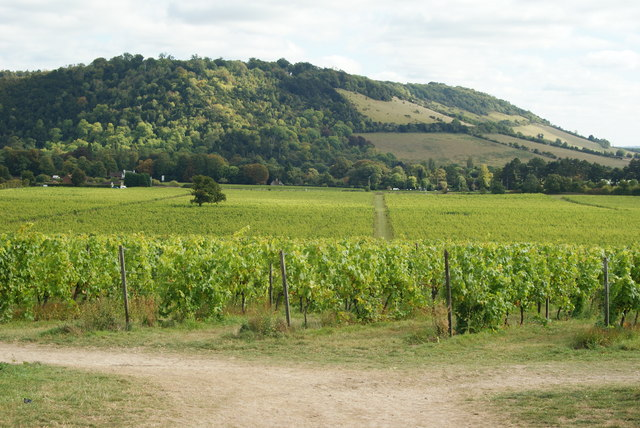
Box Hill was climbed nine times in the race

The race was 250 km (155.3 mi) long and began with a mass start. Crowds were bolstered by free entry for 150 km of the 250 km route, recent British success in the 2012 Tour de France and the possibility of the host nation winning its first gold medal of the 2012 Olympics through Mark Cavendish. Originally 3,500 paid tickets were made available for the grandstand area on Box Hill where the cyclists would undertake nine laps, but due to demand this was increased to 15,000 tickets.

== Schedule ==
All times are British Summer Time (UTC+1)

Date	Time	Round
Saturday, 28 July 2012	10:00	Final

== Results ==
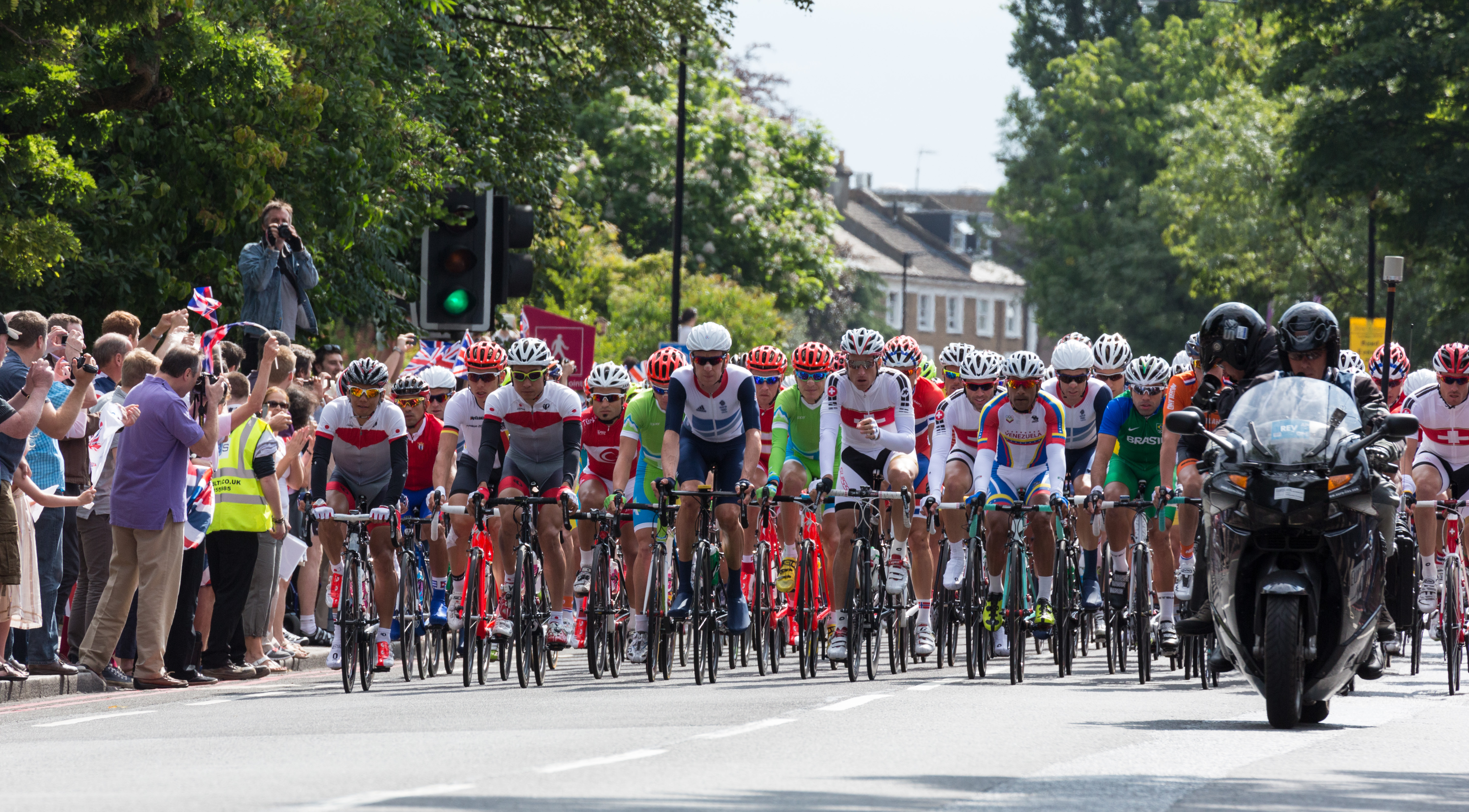
The peloton as it passed Putney in Southwest London early in the race, en route to Box Hill.

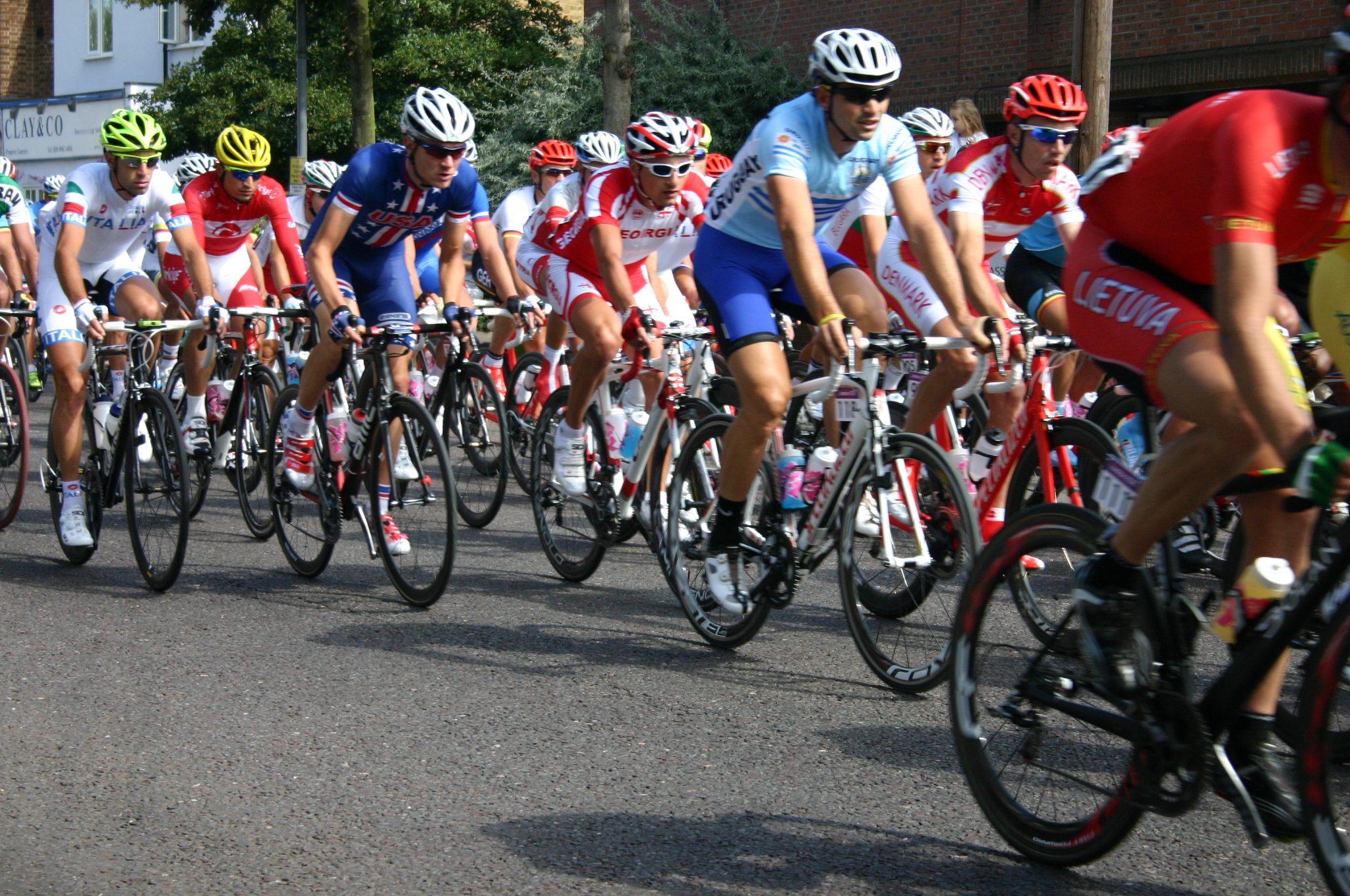
The race going through Teddington

The entry list was published on 23 July.

In the table below, "s.t." indicates that the rider crossed the finish line in the same group as the cyclist before him, and was therefore credited with the same finishing time.

Rank	Cyclist	Nation	Time
1st place, gold medalist(s)	Alexander Vinokourov	Kazakhstan	5:45:57
2nd place, silver medalist(s)	Rigoberto Urán	Colombia	s.t.
3rd place, bronze medalist(s)	Alexander Kristoff	Norway	5:46:05
4	Taylor Phinney	United States	s.t.
5	Sergey Lagutin	Uzbekistan	s.t.
6	Stuart O'Grady	Australia	s.t.
7	Jürgen Roelandts	Belgium	s.t.
8	Grégory Rast	Switzerland	s.t.
9	Luca Paolini	Italy	s.t.
10	Jack Bauer	New Zealand	s.t.
11	Lars Boom	Netherlands	s.t.
12	Jakob Fuglsang	Denmark	s.t.
13	Rui Costa	Portugal	s.t.
14	Luis León Sánchez	Spain	s.t.
15	Roman Kreuziger	Czech Republic	s.t.
16	Sergio Henao	Colombia	s.t.
17	Andriy Hryvko	Ukraine	s.t.
18	Alejandro Valverde	Spain	s.t.
19	Philippe Gilbert	Belgium	s.t.
20	Sylvain Chavanel	France	s.t.
21	Janez Brajkovič	Slovenia	s.t.
22	Fumiyuki Beppu	Japan	s.t.
23	Robert Gesink	Netherlands	s.t.
24	Alexandr Kolobnev	Russia	s.t.
25	Lars Petter Nordhaug	Norway	s.t.
26	Jonathan Castroviejo	Spain	5:46:13
27	André Greipel	Germany	5:46:37
28	Tom Boonen	Belgium	s.t.
29	Mark Cavendish	Great Britain	s.t.
30	Arnaud Démare	France	s.t.
31	Francisco Ventoso	Spain	s.t.
32	Murilo Fischer	Brazil	s.t.
33	Tyler Farrar	United States	s.t.
34	Peter Sagan	Slovakia	s.t.
35	Andrey Amador	Costa Rica	s.t.
36	Bernhard Eisel	Austria	s.t.
37	Wong Kam-po	Hong Kong	s.t.
38	Elia Viviani	Italy	s.t.
39	Héctor Rangel	Mexico	s.t.
40	Daryl Impey	South Africa	s.t.
41	Radoslav Rogina	Croatia	s.t.
42	Matti Breschel	Denmark	s.t.
43	Assan Bazayev	Kazakhstan	s.t.
44	José Joaquín Rojas	Spain	s.t.
45	Miguel Ubeto	Venezuela	s.t.
46	Borut Božič	Slovenia	s.t.
47	Ramūnas Navardauskas	Lithuania	s.t.
48	Yukiya Arashiro	Japan	s.t.
49	Manuel Antonio Cardoso	Portugal	s.t.
50	Rene Mandri	Estonia	s.t.
51	Jackson Rodríguez	Venezuela	s.t.
52	Vladimir Isaichev	Russia	s.t.
53	Yauheni Hutarovich	Belarus	s.t.
54	Ivan Stević	Serbia	s.t.
55	David McCann	Ireland	s.t.
56	Aleksejs Saramotins	Latvia	s.t.
57	Martin Elmiger	Switzerland	s.t.
57	Nicki Sørensen	Denmark	s.t.
59	Gediminas Bagdonas	Lithuania	s.t.
60	Michał Kwiatkowski	Poland	s.t.
61	Danail Petrov	Bulgaria	s.t.
62	Adil Jelloul	Morocco	s.t.
63	Ryder Hesjedal	Canada	s.t.
64	Laurent Didier	Luxembourg	s.t.
65	Jussi Veikkanen	Finland	s.t.
66	Dmytro Krivtsov	Ukraine	s.t.
67	Arnold Alcolea	Cuba	s.t.
68	Kristijan Đurasek	Croatia	s.t.
69	Nelson Oliveira	Portugal	s.t.
70	Tomás Gil	Venezuela	s.t.
71	Lars Bak	Denmark	s.t.
72	Gonzalo Garrido	Chile	s.t.
73	Daniel Teklehaymanot	Eritrea	s.t.
74	Sebastian Langeveld	Netherlands	s.t.
75	Jan Bárta	Czech Republic	s.t.
76	Gustav Larsson	Sweden	s.t.
77	Vegard Laengen	Norway	s.t.
78	Branislau Samoilau	Belarus	s.t.
79	Grega Bole	Slovenia	s.t.
80	Cadel Evans	Australia	s.t.
81	Daniel Schorn	Austria	s.t.
82	Niki Terpstra	Netherlands	s.t.
83	Simon Gerrans	Australia	s.t.
84	Maciej Bodnar	Poland	s.t.
85	Matthew Goss	Australia	s.t.
86	Tony Gallopin	France	s.t.
87	Michael Schär	Switzerland	s.t.
88	Timmy Duggan	United States	s.t.
89	Nicolas Roche	Ireland	s.t.
90	Dan Martin	Ireland	s.t.
91	Michael Rogers	Australia	s.t.
92	Greg Van Avermaet	Belgium	s.t.
93	Chris Horner	United States	5:46:46
94	Ian Stannard	Great Britain	5:46:47
95	Bert Grabsch	Germany	s.t.
96	Michael Albasini	Switzerland	s.t.
97	Lieuwe Westra	Netherlands	s.t.
98	Denis Menchov	Russia	5:46:51
99	Sacha Modolo	Italy	s.t.
100	Stijn Vandenbergh	Belgium	s.t.
101	Vincenzo Nibali	Italy	5:46:53
102	Marcel Sieberg	Germany	5:47:08
103	Bradley Wiggins	Great Britain	5:47:14
104	Tejay van Garderen	United States	5:47:31
105	John Degenkolb	Germany	5:48:49
106	Fabian Cancellara	Switzerland	5:51:40
107	Marco Pinotti	Italy	5:54:04
108	David Millar	Great Britain	5:55:16
109	Chris Froome	Great Britain	5:58:24
110	Ioannis Tamouridis	Greece	s.t.
—	Maximiliano Richeze	Argentina	OTL
—	Byron Guamá	Ecuador	OTL
—	Mehdi Sohrabi	Iran	OTL
—	Gabor Kasa	Serbia	OTL
—	Ahmet Akdilek	Turkey	OTL
—	Gregolry Panizo	Brazil	DNF
—	Edvald Boasson Hagen	Norway	DNF
—	Azzedine Lagab	Algeria	DNF
—	Spas Gyurov	Bulgaria	DNF
—	Muhamad Othman	Malaysia	DNF
—	Miraç Kal	Turkey	DNF
—	Kemal Küçükbay	Turkey	DNF
—	Muradjan Khalmuratov	Uzbekistan	DNF
—	Magno Nazaret	Brazil	DNF
—	Tony Martin	Germany	DNF
—	Krisztián Lovassy	Hungary	DNF
—	Amir Rusli	Malaysia	DNF
—	Oleg Berdos	Moldova	DNF
—	Michał Gołaś	Poland	DNF
—	Andrei Nechita	Romania	DNF
—	Vasil Kiryienka	Belarus	DNF
—	Alireza Haghi	Iran	DNF
—	Greg Henderson	New Zealand	DNF
—	Giorgi Nadiradze	Georgia	DNF
—	Park Sung-Baek	South Korea	DNF
—	Soufiane Haddi	Morocco	DNF
—	Manuel Rodas	Guatemala	DNF
—	Dan Craven	Namibia	DNF
—	Mouhssine Lahsaini	Morocco	DNF
—	Omar Hasanin	Syria	DNF
—	Jorge Soto	Uruguay	DNF
—	Fabio Duarte	Colombia	DNF
—	Mickaël Bourgain	France	DNF
—	Amir Zargari	Iran	DNF

Over time limit (OTL)
Under UCI regulations for one-day road races (article 2.3.039), "Any rider finishing in a time exceeding that of the winner by more than 5% shall not be placed". Applying this to the winning time of Alexander Vinokourov resulted in a time limit of 6 hours, 3 minutes and 14 seconds.
