= Rob Brown (journalist) =

Canadian journalist

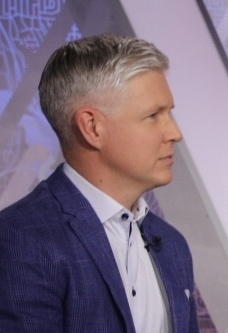
- Brown in CBC studio in Calgary
- Born: Vancouver, British Columbia, Canada
- Education: British Columbia Institute of Technology
- Occupations: Senior reporter, anchor
- Years active: 1997–present
- Spouse: Rosa Marchitelli

Rob Brown is a Canadian television journalist and anchor for CBC News Calgary.

== Early life ==
Brown was born in Vancouver, British Columbia and raised in Ladner, British Columbia. Brown had graduated British Columbia Institute of Technology in 1997, attending its journalism program.

== Newscasting career ==
Brown began his career as a photojournalist at a CTV affiliate in Yorkton, Saskatchewan. After briefly leaving CTV to cover the Legislative Assembly of Alberta and Ralph Klein, Brown had eventually returned to British Columbia. Brown had also been a videographer at the start-up A-Channel with Craig Broadcasting in Edmonton where he covered general news stories. Since then, Brown had held a number of positions such as being CTV's bureau chief for Vancouver for CTV Vancouver. Brown was also the lead reporter for CTV during the 2010 Winter Olympics. During his career, Brown had won a number of journalistic awards including the Jack Webster Award for Best News Reporting and the Edward R. Murrow Award for Best Hard News Feature.

Brown was noted for his coverage of the 2011 Stanley Cup riot, from which he reported live for CTV. Brown became a trending topic on Twitter during the riots, and earned the top spot on SportsIllustrated.com's Media Power List for June 2011. In August 2013, Brown joined CBC Calgary as anchor alongside his wife Rosa Marchitelli and became the first married couple anchors in Canadian television news history.
