= Monique Sullivan =

Canadian cyclist

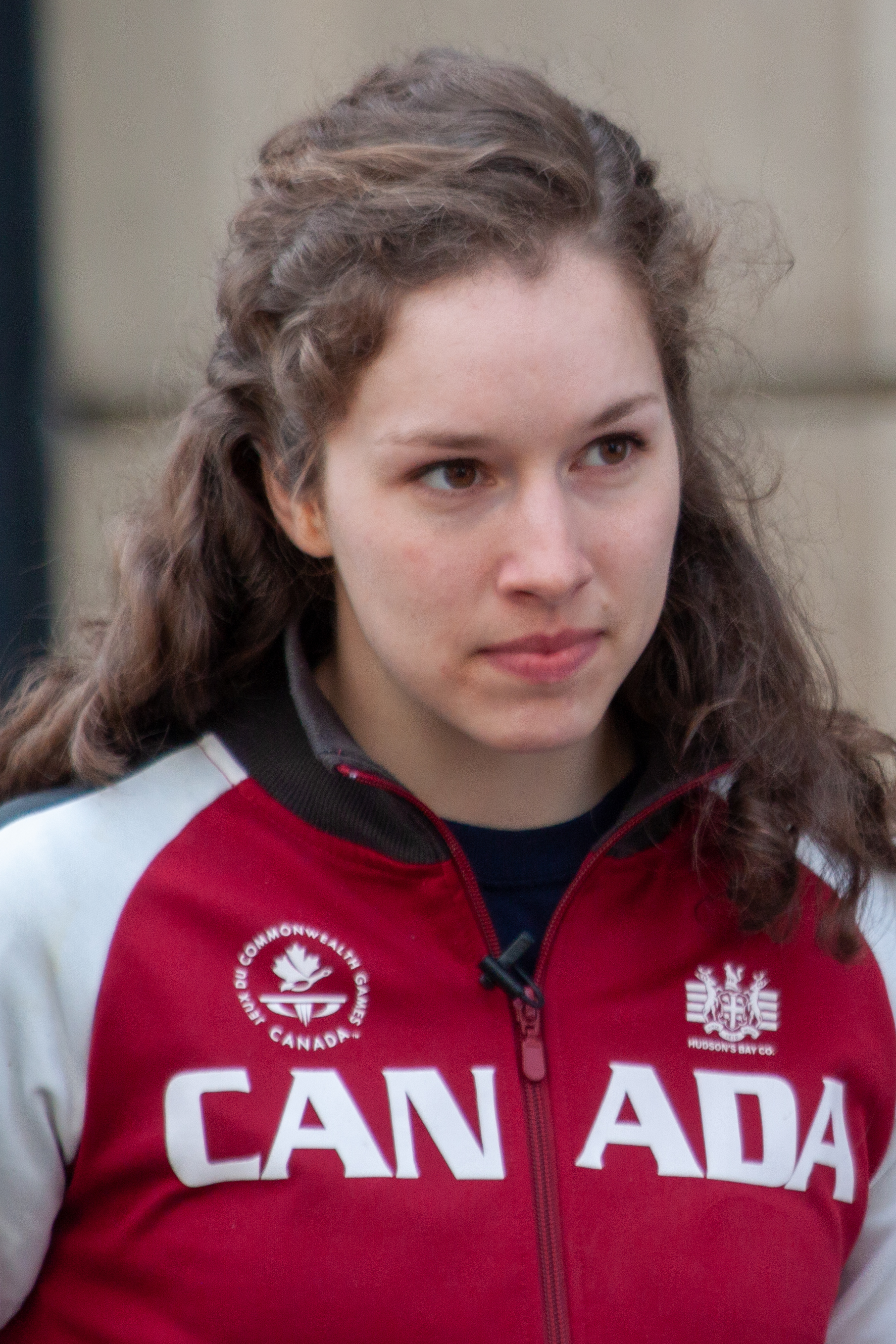
- Monique Sullivan in Calgary (2012)

Personal information
- Born: 21 February 1989 (age 37) Calgary, Alberta, Canada

Cycling career
- Sport: Cycling
- Discipline: Track
- Role: Rider
- Rider type: Sprint
Medal record
Representing Canada
Women's track cycling
Commonwealth Games
Bronze medal – third place	2010 New Delhi	Team sprint
Pan American Games
Gold medal – first place	2015 Toronto	Keirin
Gold medal – first place	2015 Toronto	Team sprint
Gold medal – first place	2015 Toronto	Sprint
Pan American Championships
Gold medal – first place	2012 Mar del Plata	Keirin
Gold medal – first place	2012 Mar del Plata	Sprint
Gold medal – first place	2014 Aguascalientes	Keirin
Gold medal – first place	2015 Santiago	Keirin
Silver medal – second place	2009 Mexico City	Team sprint
Silver medal – second place	2010 Aguascalientes	500 m time trial
Silver medal – second place	2011 Medellín	Sprint
Silver medal – second place	2014 Aguascalientes	Sprint
Bronze medal – third place	2011 Medellín	Keirin
Bronze medal – third place	2015 Santiago	Team sprint

Monique Sullivan (born 21 February 1989) is a Canadian cyclist. She was born in Calgary, Alberta. She competed in keirin at the 2012 Summer Olympics in London, where she placed sixth. She also competed in women's sprint and placed 11th.

== Career ==
She won a bronze medal at the 2007 Track Cycling World Junior Championships in the Keirin event.

In 2009, she had top-10 finishes at World Cup event in Beijing (sprint) and Manchester (keirin). She won the National Championship in the sprint event in 2010 and won bronze in the 500m. That year, she'd also capture silver at the Pan American Championships in Mexico City, Mexico and finished in fourth place in the 500m and sprint events. In 2011, Sullivan had top-10 finishes in the sprint and keirin events at the World Cup in Cali, Colombia.

In 2012, Sullivan captured double gold at the Pan American Championships in Mar del Plata, Argentina. She finished first in the women's keirin and the women's sprint. She also competed at the 2010 Commonwealth Games in Delhi, India and captured bronze in the team sprint event with Tara Whitten.

At the 2015 UCI Track Cycling World Championships, she finished 4th in the keirin event, 12th in the team sprint event, and 15th at the individual pursuit.

In 2016, she was officially named to Canada's 2016 Olympic team. In Rio, Kate O'Brien and Sullivan were eliminated in the repechage of the women's keirin. Sullivan couldn't recover in her heat race after she was boxed in, with Lyubov Shulika of Ukraine racing by her while one of the two Spanish riders came over the top, and the Canadian faded down the stretch. Overall, her results in Rio included: 8th in team sprint, 17th in individual sprint and 25th in Keirin.

== Career results ==
2014
Pan American Track Championships

1st Keirin
2nd Sprint

Grand Prix of Colorado Spring

1st Sprint
3rd Keirin

Copa Internacional de Pista

1st Keirin
1st Sprint
3rd 500m Time Trial

Los Angeles Grand Prix

1st Sprint
2nd Keirin

3rd Keirin, Festival of Speed
2015
Pan American Track Championships

1st Keirin
1st Sprint
3rd Team Sprint (with Kate O'Brien)

Pan American Games

1st Keirin
1st Sprint
1st Team Sprint (with Kate O'Brien)

Milton International Challenge

1st Sprint
1st Team Sprint (with Kate O'Brien)
2nd Keirin

1st Keirin, Fastest Man on Wheels
Festival of Speed

1st Keirin
3rd Sprint

3rd Sprint, US Sprint GP
2016
Festival of Speed

1st Keirin
1st Sprint

1st Sprint, US Sprint GP
