= Cycling at the 2015 Pan American Games – Women's keirin =

Cycling – Women's keirin at the 2015 Pan American Games
- Venue: Milton Velodrome
- Dates: July 17
- Competitors: 10 from 10 nations

Medalists
Gold medal	Monique Sullivan	Canada
Silver medal	Lisandra Guerra	Cuba
Bronze medal	Juliana Gaviria	Colombia

The women's keirin competition of the cycling events at the 2015 Pan American Games was held on July 17 at the Milton Velodrome in Milton, Ontario

== Schedule ==
All times are Eastern Daylight Time (UTC-4).

Date	Time	Round
July 17, 2015	12:01	First Round
July 17, 2015	19:17	Final

== Results ==
=== First round ===
==== Heat 1 ====
Rank	Name	Nation	Notes
1	Monique Sullivan	Canada	Q
2	Juliana Gaviria	Colombia	Q
3	Alice Tamirys Leite De Melo	Brazil	Q
4	Mariaesthela Vilera	Venezuela	
5	Deborah Coronel	Argentina	

==== Heat 2 ====
Rank	Name	Nation	Notes
1	Lisandra Guerra	Cuba	Q
2	Karen Cruz	El Salvador	Q
3	Daniela Gaxiola	Mexico	Q
4	Maria Jimenez Galicia	Guatemala	
5	Miryam Núñez	Ecuador	

=== Finals ===
==== Finals 7–12 ====
Rank	Name	Nation	Notes
7	Mariaesthela Vilera	Venezuela	
8	Maria Jimenez Galicia	Guatemala	
9	Deborah Coronel	Argentina	
10	Miryam Núñez	Ecuador	

==== Finals 1–6 ====
Rank	Name	Nation	Notes
1st place, gold medalist(s)	Monique Sullivan	Canada	
2nd place, silver medalist(s)	Lisandra Guerra	Cuba	
3rd place, bronze medalist(s)	Juliana Gaviria	Colombia	
4	Karen Cruz	El Salvador	
5	Daniela Gaxiola	Mexico	
6	Alice Tamirys Leite De Melo	Brazil	
