= Judith A. Snider =

Judge of the Federal Court of Canada
- In office July 2, 2003 – October 15, 2013

Personal details
- Born: January 26, 1948 (age 78) Toronto, Ontario

Judith A. Snider (born January 26, 1948) is a judge retired from the Federal Court of Canada. She retired from the court October 15, 2013 and currently is an international mediator and arbitrator.

== Background ==
Her undergraduate education was at Carleton University and she is a graduate of the University of Calgary Law School in 1981. She was a partner at the law firm of Code Hunter from 1987 to 1992 and became General Counsel for the National Energy Board for the years 1992 to 1995 as a member from 1995 to 2002, and as Vice-Chairman from 1999 to 2002.
