= Kate O'Brien (cyclist) =

Canadian cyclist and bobsledder

Personal information
- Full name: Kate Elizabeth O'Brien
- Born: July 23, 1988 (age 38) Calgary, Alberta, Canada
- Height: 1.68 m (5 ft 6 in)
- Weight: 70 kg (154 lb)

Cycling career
- Sport: Cycling
- Discipline: Track cycling
Medal record
Representing Canada
Women's bobsleigh
World Championships
Bronze medal – third place	2015 Winterberg	Mixed team
Women's para cycling
Paralympic Games
Silver medal – second place	2020 Tokyo	C4-5 time trial
Bronze medal – third place	2024 Paris	C4-5 time trial
Track World Championships
Gold medal – first place	2020 Milton	Time trial C4
Silver medal – second place	2022 Saint-Quentin-en-Yvelines	Time trial C4
Silver medal – second place	2023 Glasgow	Time trial C4
Pan American Games
Gold medal – first place	2015 Toronto	Team sprint
Silver medal – second place	2015 Toronto	Sprint
Track World Cup
Silver medal – second place	2017 Los Angeles	Team sprint
Pan American Championships
Bronze medal – third place	2015 Santiago	Team sprint

Kate Elizabeth O'Brien (born July 23, 1988) is a Canadian female track cyclist and former bobsledder. She won a silver medal at the 2020 Summer Paralympics and a bronze medal at the 2024 Summer Paralympics.

== Career ==
After being introduced to bobsleigh in 2010, O’Brien competed at the 2013 FIBT World Championships with pilot Jenny Ciochetti, but a torn hamstring took her out of the first half of the Olympic season and she missed qualifying as a bobsleigh brakeman for the 2014 Winter Olympics. She decided to try piloting a bobsled and attended driving school in Calgary in March 2014. At the same time, there was a testing camp for Cycling Canada at the Canadian Sport Institute. Having scored good test results, she was competing internationally within months. In September, she debuted at the Pan American Championships, finishing fifth in both the team sprint (with Monique Sullivan) and the keirin. O’Brien split 2014-15 between track cycling and bobsleigh, competing on both World Cup circuits as well as at both world championships. At the 2015 UCI Track Cycling World Championships, she and Sullivan finished twelfth in the women's team sprint. In June 2015, she broke the 200 m time trial record that stood for 19 years at the Lehigh Valley Preferred Cycling Center in Trexlertown, Pennsylvania. By the following month, O'Brien and Sullivan set a track record to capture the women's sprint title at the 2015 Pan American Games in Toronto. Moreover, she managed to add a silver to her Pan American Games career tally in the individual sprint race, with the gold going to her teammate Sullivan.

In 2016, she was officially named to Canada's 2016 Olympic team and competed in all three track cycling sprint events.

O'Brien claimed 5th place at the 2017 World Championships (in the team sprint, with Amelia Walsh), and silver in the 2017 World Cup in L.A. She is the current Canadian record holder in the 500m time trial and in the team sprint.

In 2017, a disastrous training accident at the Glenmore Velodrome in Calgary left her fighting for life and left her with extensive injuries. These included a severe head injury that left her unable to walk, talk or breathe unassisted. She was informed by her doctors that she would be unable to participate in sports again. She did not accept this and fought to recover, and despite having now been diagnosed as epileptic, returned to the sport and was inducted by the Canadian Para-Cycling team, where she continued her training before her debut with the team in the UCI Para Cycling Track Championships. In this event, she set a new world record time for the C4 500m sprint and won a gold medal as well as a world record for the 200m time trial. She continued her recovery in hopes of being named to the Canadian Paralympic cycling team in 2020. At the 2020 Summer Paralympics, she finished second in the C4-5 500 metres time trial and did not finish in the road cycling time trial. In the 2022 World Para Cycling Track Championship in Saint-Quentin-en-Yvelines, France, she won a silver medal in C4 500 metres time trial. In the same event in the following year held in Glasgow, she again won a silver medal.

She won a bronze medal in C4-5 500 metres time trial at the 2024 Summer Paralympics. She was beaten by the French cyclist Marie Patouillet who took silver and who is also gay. Patouillet who is an LGBT+activist said that she was inspired by British gay athletes

== Career results ==
2014
3rd Team Sprint, Copa Internacional de Pista (with Sara Byers)
2015
Pan American Games

1st Team Sprint (with Monique Sullivan)
2nd Sprint

Milton International Challenge

1st Team Sprint (with Monique Sullivan)
3rd Sprint

2nd Sprint, US Sprint GP
3rd Team Sprint, Pan American Track Championships (with Monique Sullivan)
2016
1st Keirin, Fastest Man on Wheels
Milton International Challenge

2nd Keirin
2nd Sprint

Festival of Speed

2nd Keirin
2nd Sprint

2017
5th Team Sprint, World Championships
2nd Sprint, US Sprint GP
2020
1st WR 500m Sprint
1st WR 200m Time trial
2021
Paralympic Games

2nd Time Trial

2022
Track World Championships

2nd Time Trial

2023
Track World Championships

2nd Time Trial

2024
Paralympic Games

3rd Time Trial

== Personal life ==
O'Brien is openly lesbian. O'Brien is married to Meghan Grant and resides in Calgary, Alberta.

== See also ==
- List of athletes who have competed in the Paralympics and Olympics
- Georgia Simmerling, Canadian track cyclist who has competed in Summer and Winter Olympics
- Clara Hughes, Canadian cyclist who has competed in Summer and Winter Olympics
