= Barbara Demeneix =

French biologist

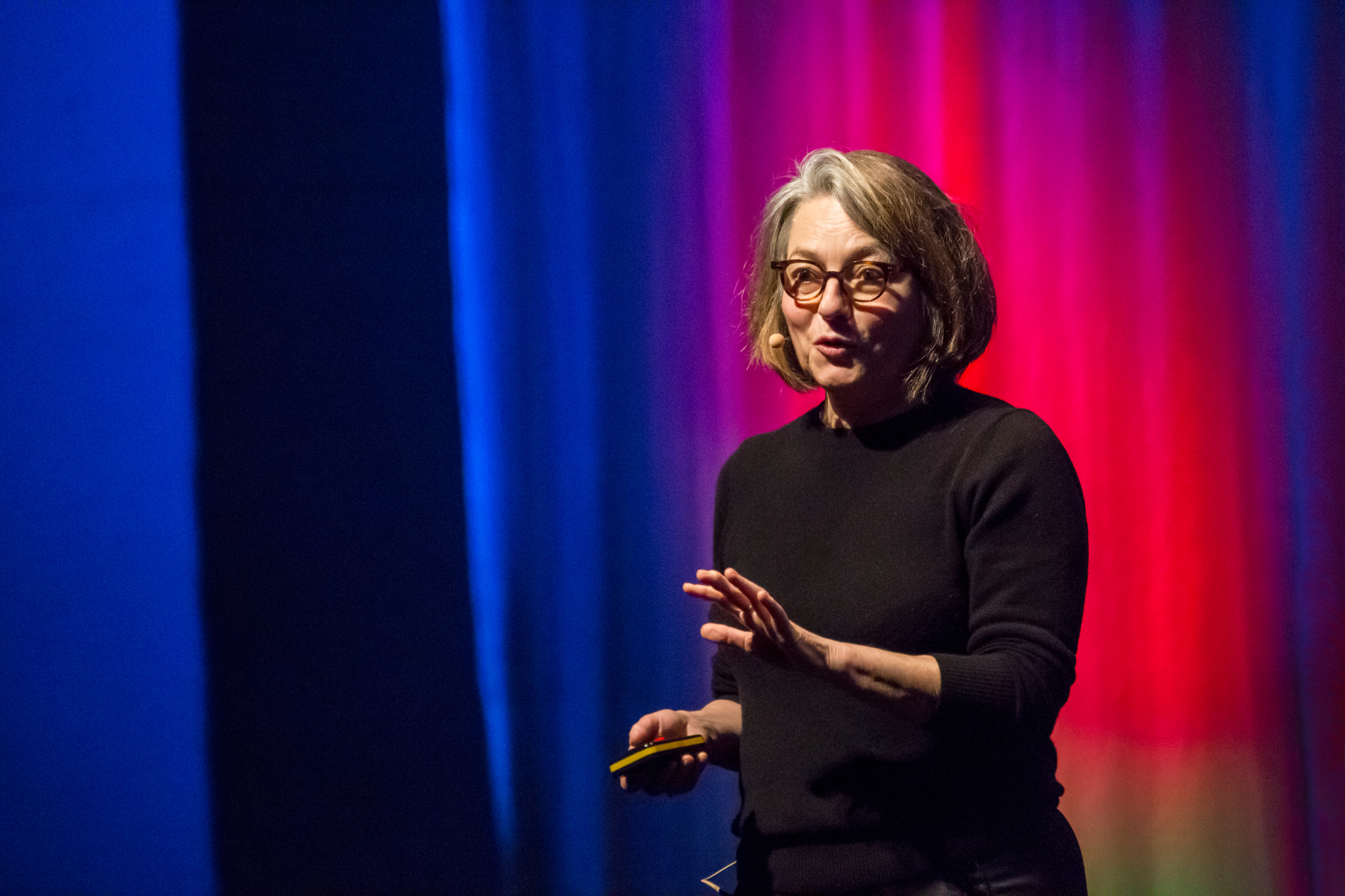
Barbara Demeinex, February 2018

Barbara Demeneix (born 1949) is a biologist and endocrinologist. She is currently team leader in a CNRS research unit at the National Museum of Natural History in Paris, France.

== Education ==
Barbara Demeneix obtained her Bachelor of Science (B.Sc. Hons) at the University of Wales and an M.Sc. at the University of Clermont-Ferrand (France). She completed her PhD in endocrinology and physiology at the University of Calgary (Canada) in 1977 as well as her Doctorat d’Etat (D.Sc.) at the University Paris VI in 1983.

== Research career ==
Between 1970 and 1981 Barbara Demeneix taught at different levels in Malawi, Canada, Morocco and France, before taking up a Lectureship at the University Louis Pasteur in Strasbourg from 1981 to 1989. During this period she undertook two research fellowships in the Molecular Neurobiology Laboratory in Cambridge (1986) and in the Max Planck Institute in Munich (1988-1989).

Since arriving at the National Museum of Natural History in 1990 her research focused on the evolution of thyroid hormone signaling. She sought to understand how thyroid hormones activate or repress gene activity in different tissues at various developmental states and in changing physiological conditions. Working with amphibian and mouse models, she contributed to developing and optimizing techniques to study gene regulation in integrated contexts. Technologies have been patented and licensed out to SMEs (Polyplus, WatchFrog).

In the laboratory, these methods have been applied to advance understanding of:

- how thyroid hormone exerts negative feedback effects on hypothalamic controls,
- how thyroid hormone regulates adult neurogenesis during aging,
- how thyroid hormone acts in early amphibian development and in metamorphosis.

Barbara Demeneix was nominated to the Chair of Comparative Physiology in the National Museum of Natural History in Paris in 1995. This position was previously held by Claude Bernard, Jean-Pierre Flourens and Frédéric Cuvier. In 1998 she took on the twin direction of Museum Comparative Physiology Laboratory and the CNRS unit UMR 7221 ‘Evolution of Endocrine Regulations’ (1998-2013). In 2001 she became director of the Department ‘Regulations and Development’ of the National Museum of Natural History, a post she held until 2017. This department grouped 3 main research units representing 200 staff. During this period she coordinated two large-scale European projects: CRESCENDO (2005-2011) on nuclear receptors in development and aging, and SWITCHBOX (2011-2015) on maintaining health in old age through homeostasis.

Barbara Demeneix is active with international committees addressing thyroid hormone and endocrine disruption (including the OECD and the European Thyroid Association).

In 2016 she co-published an opinion column in Le Monde with more than 100 other scientists, in which they asked the EU and the international community to act against endocrine disrupting chemicals. They also condemned the use of strategies for manufacturing doubt employed by industries in the climate change battle.

== Awards ==
- 2004 Chevalier de la Légion d’Honneur
- 2011 Nature Award for Mentoring in Science (France)
- 2014 Officier de la Légion d’Honneur
- 2014 CNRS Medal for Innovation
- 2017 Finalist of the EU Prize for Women Innovators
- 2018 Commander of the French National Order of Merit

== Publications ==
Barbara Demeneix has published more than 170 scientific publications, and two first-author books.

=== Books ===
- Losing our Minds: How environmental pollution impairs human intelligence and mental health, Oxford University Press, 2014. Translated into French: Le Cerveau endommagé: Comment la pollution altère notre intelligence et notre santé mentale, Editions Odile Jacob, 2016.
- Toxic Cocktail: How chemical pollution is poisoning our brains, Oxford University Press, 2017. Translated into French: Cocktail toxique: Comment les perturbateurs endocriniens empoisonnent notre cerveau, Editions Odile Jacob, 2017.
