= Rosa Marchitelli =

Canadian journalist

Rosa Marchitelli is a Canadian journalist from Calgary who is primarily known for her work at CBC. She graduated from the University of Calgary with a B.A. in English and from Ryerson University in Toronto with a B.A.A. in Journalism. She started out working in Calgary and then became the Vancouver CBC News Anchor as well as reporter and producer. She is currently the co-host of CBC News' investigative segment Go Public and is also featured as a national correspondent.

Marchitelli has been recognized for excellence in journalism with a National RTDNA Dave Rogers Award for her short feature: Failure to Protect. She is also the recipient of a coveted Gabriel Award and a Jack Webster Awards finalist for Best News Reporting of the Year.

Marchitelli is married to CBC journalist Rob Brown who she met while working in an Edmonton newsroom early in her career. She and her husband were said to be the only husband and wife co-anchors in Canadian media when they both began co-anchoring CBC Calgary in September 2013.
