= Clinical Medicine & Research =

- Language: English

Publication details
- History: 2003–present
- Publisher: Marshfield Clinic Research Foundation
- Frequency: Quarterly
- Open access: Yes

Standard abbreviations
- ISO 4: Clin. Med. Res.

Indexing
- CODEN: CMRLAM
- ISSN: 1539-4182 (print); 1554-6179 (web)
- LCCN: 2002213499
- OCLC no.: 49497616

Links
- Journal homepage; Online access

Clinical Medicine & Research is an open-access, peer-reviewed, academic journal of clinical medicine published by the Marshfield Clinic Research Foundation. The journal is currently edited by Adedayo A. Onitilo (Marshfield Clinic).

== Abstracting and indexing ==
The journal is abstracted and indexed in the following bibliographic databases:

- Chemical Abstracts Service
- CINAHL
- EBSCOHost
- Embase
- Emerging Sources Citation Index
- Scopus
- Index Medicus/MEDLINE/PubMed
