= Samuel Weiss (neurobiologist) =

Canadian biochemist

Samuel Weiss CM (born 1955) is a Canadian neurobiologist.

== Biography ==
Weiss was an undergraduate at McGill University, where he received a B.Sc. in Biochemistry in 1978. He then went on to take his Ph.D. in Neurobiology at the University of Calgary. From 1983 to 1988 he held two postdoctoral fellowships funded by the AHFMR and the Medical Research Council of Canada (now the Canadian Institutes of Health Research), the first at the Centre de Pharmacologie-Endocologie, Montpellier, France, and the second at the University of Vermont College of Medicine. He was appointed Assistant Professor and MRC Scholar at The University of Calgary in 1988.

In 1985 Dr. Weiss and Fritz Sladeczek discovered the metabotropic glutamate receptor, currently an extremely important area of research for neurological disorders. Dr. Weiss was appointed Assistant Professor and MRC Scholar at The University of Calgary in 1988. In 1992, while working at the University of Calgary, Dr. Weiss and graduate student Brent Reynolds found cells in the brains of fetal and adult mice that divided to produce new cells. They claimed that they successfully isolated stem cells and got them to divide and multiply in a lab dish. The success of this experiment suggested that stem cells could be coaxed into producing new cells to replace damaged or destroyed brain cells.

His discovery of the metabotropic glutamate receptors opened a major new research area and currently the G-protein coupled metabotropic glutamate receptors (GRMs/mGluRs) have been implicated in the aetiology of schizophrenia, in amyloid beta-peptide toxicity, Creutzfeldt–Jakob disease and Fragile X syndrome. His discovery of adult mammalian central nervous system stem cells has generated two new and important perspectives. First, neural development continues throughout the lifetime of adult mammals. Second, insights into ongoing adult cell production will allow for the use of stem cells to repair neural tissue and allow for functional recovery from brain and spinal cord injury or disease. Dr. Weiss has shown how prolactin increases the production of new brain cells and that new stem cell-generated brain cells can be redirected to part of the rodent brain that are damaged after stroke which results in partial improvement of the animals ability to move its limbs. He is now trying to link the two to aid stroke recovery.

Currently Dr. Weiss is a Professor in the Department of Cell Biology & Anatomy/Pharmacology & Therapeutics and a member of the Genes and Development Research Group Faculty of Medicine University of Calgary. He is also the director of the Hotchkiss Brain Institute, sits on numerous national and international peer review committees, has authored many publications, holds key patents in the neural stem cell field and has founded two biotechnology companies. The second company, Stem Cell Therapeutics, is currently developing his discoveries for the treatment of various CNS disorders, including stroke.

== Honours and awards ==
- 2002: Fondation IPSEN (France) prize in Neuronal Plasticity
- 2004: Canadian Federation of Biological Societies Presidents’ Award in Life Sciences Research
- 2008: Gairdner Foundation International Award "for his seminal discovery of adult neural stem cells in the mammalian brain and its importance in nerve cell regeneration"
- 2009: Elected as a Fellow of the Royal Society of Canada
- 2010: CCNP Innovations in Neuropsychopharmacology Award.
- 2023: Order of Canada

== Bibliography ==
- Reynolds, B.A. and Weiss, S. (1992) “Generation of neurons and astrocytes from isolated cells of the adult mammalian central nervous system” (Science 255, pp 1707–1710)
- Weiss, S., Reynolds, B. A., Vescovi, A., Morshead, C., Craig, C.G., and van der Kooy, D. (1996) “Is there a stem cell in the mammalian forebrain?” (Trends in Neurosciences 19, pp 387–93)
- van der Kooy, D. and Weiss, S. (2000) “Why stem cells?” (Science 287, pp 1439–1441)
