= Frany Fong =

Mexican cyclist

Frany María Fong Echavarría
Personal information
- Born: 28 August 1992 (age 34) Los Mochis, Sinaloa, Mexico

Cycling career
- Sport: Cycling
- Discipline: Track cycling

Frany María Fong Echavarría (born 28 August 1992 in Los Mochis, Sinaloa) is a Mexican track cyclist. She represented her nation at the 2014 and 2015 UCI Track Cycling World Championships.
