= Lisandra Guerra =

Cuban cyclist (born 1987)

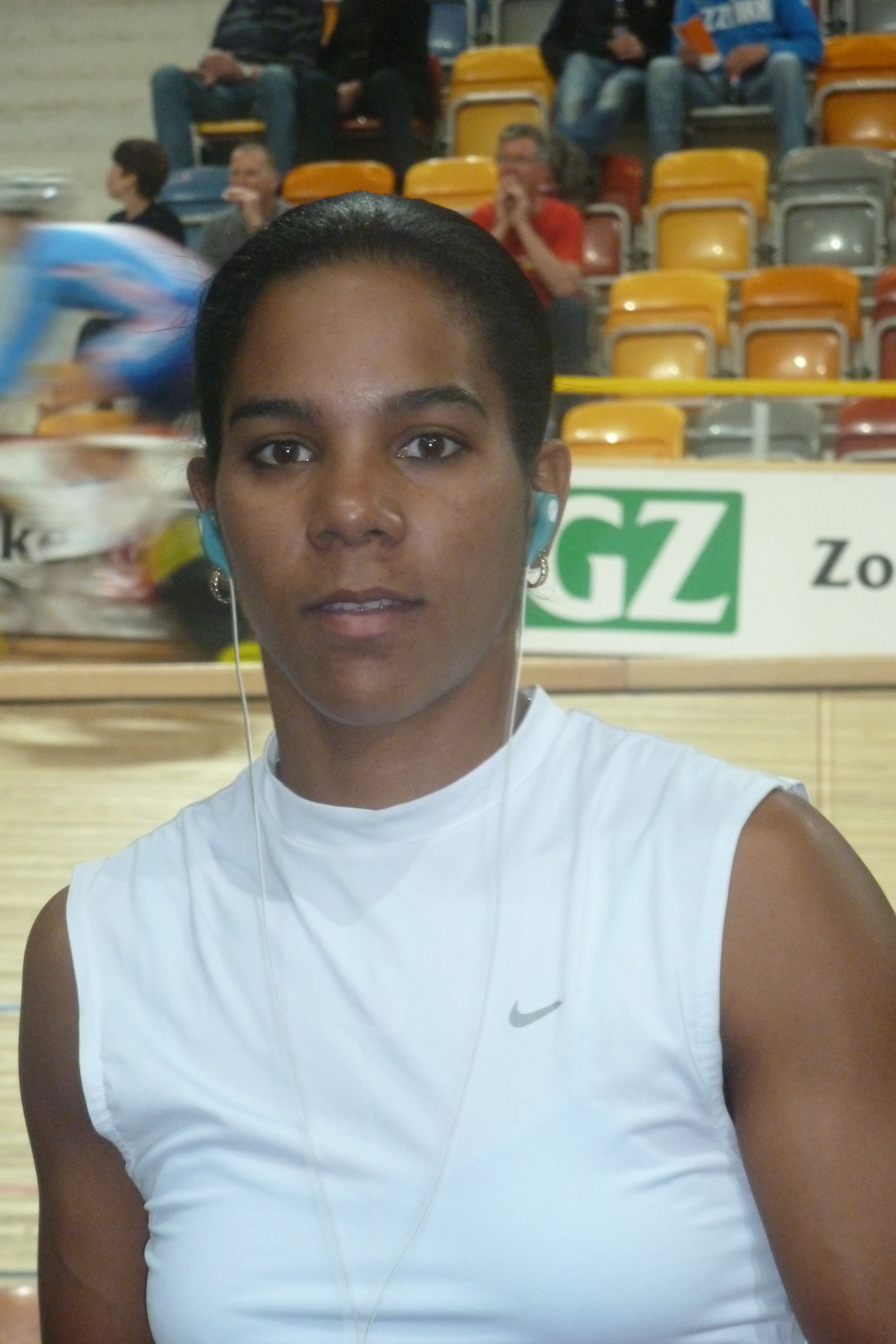
- Guerra in 2011

Personal information
- Full name: Lisandra Guerra Rodriguez
- Born: 31 October 1987 (age 38)

Cycling career
- Sport: Cycling
- Discipline: Track
- Role: Rider
Medal record
Women's track cycling
Representing Cuba
World Championships
| Gold medal – first place | 2008 Manchester | 500 m time trial |
| Silver medal – second place | 2007 Palma de Mallorca | 500 m time trial |
| Bronze medal – third place | 2006 Bordeaux | 500 m time trial |
| Bronze medal – third place | 2013 Minsk | Keirin |
| Bronze medal – third place | 2015 Yvelines | Keirin |
Pan American Games
| Gold medal – first place | 2011 Guadalajara | Sprint |
| Silver medal – second place | 2007 Rio de Janeiro | Sprint |
| Silver medal – second place | 2015 Toronto | Team sprint |
| Silver medal – second place | 2015 Toronto | Keirin |
| Silver medal – second place | 2019 Lima | Keirin |
Pan American Championships
| Gold medal – first place | 2005 Mar del Plata | 500 m time trial |
| Gold medal – first place | 2006 São Paulo | 500 m time trial |
| Gold medal – first place | 2006 São Paulo | Keirin |
| Gold medal – first place | 2007 Valencia | Sprint |
| Gold medal – first place | 2007 Valencia | 500 m time trial |
| Gold medal – first place | 2009 Mexico City | 500 m time trial |
| Gold medal – first place | 2009 Mexico City | Keirin |
| Gold medal – first place | 2009 Mexico City | Sprint |
| Gold medal – first place | 2010 Aguascalientes | 500 m time trial |
| Gold medal – first place | 2010 Aguascalientes | Keirin |
| Gold medal – first place | 2010 Aguascalientes | Sprint |
| Gold medal – first place | 2010 Aguascalientes | Team sprint |
| Gold medal – first place | 2011 Medellin | 500 m time trial |
| Gold medal – first place | 2011 Medellin | Keirin |
| Gold medal – first place | 2011 Medellin | Sprint |
| Gold medal – first place | 2012 Mar del Plata | 500 m time trial |
| Gold medal – first place | 2013 Mexico City | 500 m time trial |
| Gold medal – first place | 2013 Mexico City | Sprint |
| Gold medal – first place | 2013 Mexico City | Keirin |
| Gold medal – first place | 2014 Aguascalientes | 500 m time trial |
| Gold medal – first place | 2014 Aguascalientes | Sprint |
| Silver medal – second place | 2005 Mar del Plata | Sprint |
| Silver medal – second place | 2005 Mar del Plata | Keirin |
| Silver medal – second place | 2006 São Paulo | Sprint |
| Silver medal – second place | 2007 Valencia | Keirin |
| Silver medal – second place | 2007 Valencia | Team sprint |
| Silver medal – second place | 2012 Mar del Plata | Sprint |
| Silver medal – second place | 2013 Mexico City | Team sprint |
| Bronze medal – third place | 2011 Medellin | Team sprint |
| Bronze medal – third place | 2014 Aguascalientes | Team sprint |
| Bronze medal – third place | 2015 Santiago | Sprint |
| Bronze medal – third place | 2015 Santiago | 500 m time trial |
Central American and Caribbean Games
| Gold medal – first place | 2006 Cartagena | Sprint |
| Bronze medal – third place | 2006 Cartagena | 500m time trial |

Lisandra Guerra Rodriguez (born 31 October 1987, Matanzas) is a Cuban racing cyclist.

== Major results ==
2005
1st 500 m TT, UCI Track Cycling World Championships – Juniors
1st Sprint, UCI Track Cycling World Championships – Juniors
1st Pan American Championships, Track, 500 m
2nd Pan American Championships, Track, Sprint
2nd Pan American Championships, Track, Keirin

2006
1st Pan American Championships, Track, 500 m
1st Pan American Championships, Track, Keirin
2nd Pan American Championships, Track, Sprint
3rd 500 m TT, UCI Track Cycling World Championships
2nd Moscow, Sprint
1st Moscow, 500 m

2007
1st Los Angeles, 500 m
3rd Los Angeles, Team Sprint
2nd 500 m TT, UCI Track Cycling World Championships
2nd Pan American Championships, Track, Keirin
1st Pan American Championships, Track, 500 m TT
1st Pan American Championships, Track, Sprint
2nd Pan American Championships, Track, Team Sprint
1st Aigle, 500 m
3rd Aigle, Elimination race
2nd Aigle, Keirin
2nd Sydney, 500 m
1st Beijing, 500 m

2008
1st Los Angeles, 500 m

2011
1st Pan American Games, Track, Sprint
2013
Copa Cuba de Pista

1st Keirin
1st Sprint
1st Team Sprint (with Laura Arias)
1st 500m Time Trial

2014
Pan American Championships

1st Sprint
1st 500m Time Trial
3rd Team Sprint (with Marlies Mejias Garcia)

Central American and Caribbean Games

1st Keirin
1st Sprint
1st Team Sprint (with Marlies Mejias Garcia)
1st 500m Time Trial

Copa Cuba de Pista

1st Keirin
1st Sprint
1st Team Sprint (with Laura Arias)
1st 500m Time Trial

Cottbuser SprintCup

2nd Keirin
3rd 500m Time Trial

2nd Sprint, Cottbuser Nächte

2015
Cottbuser SprintCup

1st 500m Time Trial
2nd Keirin
3rd Sprint

Pan American Games

2nd Keirin
2nd Team Sprint (with Marlies Mejias Garcia)

2nd Keirin, GP von Deutschland im Sprint
Pan American Track Championships

3rd Sprint
3rd 500m Time Trial

3rd Keirin, Oberhausen
3rd Keirin, Cottbuser SprintCup

2016
Cottbuser SprintCup

1st Keirin
1st 500m Time Trial
2nd Sprint

2nd Sprint, Grand Prix of Poland
2nd Sprint, GP von Deutschland im Sprint
3rd Sprint, Fenioux Piste International
