= Cuba at the UCI Track Cycling World Championships =

- IOC code: CUB
- Medals: Gold 4 Silver 4 Bronze 3 Total 11

UCI Track Cycling World Championships appearances (overview)
- Recent: 2008; 2009; 2010; 2011; 2012; 2013; 2014; 2015; 2016; 2017; 2018; 2019; 2020; 2021; 2022; 2023; 2024; 2025

This page is an overview of Cuba at the UCI Track Cycling World Championships.

== List of medalists ==
This is a list of Cuban medals won at the UCI Track World Championships. This list does not (yet) include the amateur disciplines and defunct disciplines.

Medal	Championship	Name	Event
Gold	2003 Stuttgart	Yoanka González	Women's points race
Gold	2004 Melbourne	Yoanka González	Women's scratch
Bronze	2006 Bordeaux	Lisandra Guerra	Women's 500 m time trial
Gold	2007 Palma de Mallorca	Yumari González	Women's scratch
Silver	2007 Palma de Mallorca	Lisandra Guerra	Women's 500 m time trial
Silver	2008 Manchester	Yumari González	Women's scratch
Bronze	2008 Manchester	Lisandra Guerra	Women's 500 m time trial
Gold	2009 Pruszków	Yumari González	Women's scratch
Silver	2009 Pruszków	Yumari González	Women's points race
Silver	2010 Ballerup	Yumari González	Women's scratch
Bronze	2013 Minsk	Lisandra Guerra	Women's keirin

== Most successful Cuban competitors ==
Name	Medals	Championships
Yumari González	2 gold, 3 silver, 0 bronze	(gold) 2007 Palma de Mallorca – Women's scratch (gold) 2009 Pruszków – Women's scratch (silver) 2008 Manchester – Women's scratch (silver) 2009 Pruszków – Women's points race (silver) 2010 Ballerup – Women's scratch
Yoanka González	2 gold, 0 silver, 0 bronze	(gold) 2003 Stuttgart – Women's points race (gold) 2004 Melbourne – Women's scratch

=== Medals by discipline ===
updated after the 2014 UCI Track Cycling World Championships

Event	Gold	Silver	Bronze	Total	Rank
Women's 500 m time trial	0	1	2	3	
Women's keirin	0	0	1	1	
Women's scratch	3	2	0	5	1
Women's points race	1	1	0	2	
Total	4	4	3	11	

== Cuba at the 2008 UCI Track Cycling World Championships ==
Cuba at the 2008 UCI Track Cycling World Championships
- IOC code: CUB

in Manchester, Great Britain 26 March 2008 – 30 March 2008
- Competitors: 3 in 5 events
- Medals Ranked 6thth: Gold 1 Silver 1 Bronze 0 Total 2

UCI Track Cycling World Championships appearances (overview)
- See Cuba at the UCI Track Cycling World Championships

Cuba competed at the 2008 UCI Track Cycling World Championships in Manchester, Great Britain, from 26 March to 30 March 2008. The event consisted of 18 different disciplines for elite men and women, Cuba competed in 5 women's disciplines.

== List of medalists ==
Medal	Name	Event	Event
Gold	Lisandra Guerra Rodriguez	Women's 500 m time trial	26 March
Silver	Yumari González Valdivieso	Women's scratch	30 March

=== Sprint ===
Cyclist	Event	Qualification		1/16 final	1/8 final	Repechage	Quarterfinals	Semifinals	Final	
Cyclist	Event	Time Speed (km/h)	Rank	Opposition Time Speed (km/h)	Opposition Time Speed (km/h)	Opposition Time Speed (km/h)	Opposition Time	Opposition Time	Opposition Time	Rank
Lisandra Guerra Rodriguez	Women's sprint	11.169; 64.464	5 Q	Welte (GER); W 11.699; 61.543	Muche (GER); W 11.636; 61.876	BYE	Reed (USA); L, L	Did not advance	Race for 5th place Kanis (NED); Sanchez (FRA); Hijgenaar (NED); L	7

=== Time trial ===
Cyclist	Event	Final	
Cyclist	Event	Time Speed (km/h)	Rank
Lisandra Guerra Rodriguez	Women's 500 m time trial	34.021; 52.908	1st place, gold medalist(s)

=== Keirin ===
Cyclist	Event	1st round	Repechage	2nd round	Final
Cyclist	Event	Rank	Rank	Rank	Rank
Lisandra Guerra Rodriguez	Women's keirin	2 Q	BYE	4	Race for 7th place 10

=== Scratch ===
Cyclist	Event	Final
Cyclist	Event	Rank
Yumari González Valdivieso	Women's scratch	2nd place, silver medalist(s)

=== Points race ===
Cyclist	Event	Final			
Cyclist	Event	Points	Laps	Finish order	Rank
Yoanka González Pérez	Women's points race	10	0		5

== Cuba at the 2015 UCI Track Cycling World Championships ==
Cuba at the 2015 UCI Track Cycling World Championships
- IOC code: CUB

in Saint-Quentin-en-Yvelines, France 18 February – 22 February 2015
- Competitors: 6
- Medals Ranked 16th: Gold 0 Silver 0 Bronze 1 Total 1

UCI Track Cycling World Championships appearances (overview)
- Overview page Recent: 2008; 2009; 2010; 2011; 2012; 2013; 2014; 2015; 2016; 2017; 2018; 2019; 2020; 2021; 2022; 2023; 2024; 2025

Cuba competed at the 2015 UCI Track Cycling World Championships in Saint-Quentin-en-Yvelines at the Vélodrome de Saint-Quentin-en-Yvelines from 18 to 22 February 2015. A team of 6 cyclists (6 women, 0 men) was announced to represent the country in the event.

=== Women ===
Name	Event	Result	Rank
Lisandra Guerra	Women's sprint	11.121 (Q),	18
Lisandra Guerra	Women's 500 m time trial	34.226	9
Marlies Mejías	Women's individual pursuit	3:35.570	8
Arlenis Sierra	Women's points race	7 points	8
Marlies Mejías	Women's omnium	149 points	5
Yumari González	Women's scratch	—	DNF
Marlies Mejías; Yudelmis Domínguez; Yoanka González; Yumari González	Women's team pursuit	4:36.100	13
Lisandra Guerra	Women's keirin		3rd place, bronze medalist(s)

== Cuba at the 2016 UCI Track Cycling World Championships ==
Cuba at the 2016 UCI Track Cycling World Championships
- IOC code: CUB

in London, United Kingdom 2 March – 6 March 2016
- Competitors: 3 (0 men, 3 women)

UCI Track Cycling World Championships appearances (overview)
- Recent: 2008; 2009; 2010; 2011; 2012; 2013; 2014; 2015; 2016; 2017; 2018; 2019; 2020; 2021; 2022; 2023; 2024; 2025

Cuba competed at the 2016 UCI Track Cycling World Championships at the Lee Valley VeloPark in London, United Kingdom from 2–4 March 2016. A team of 3 cyclists (3 women, 0 men) was announced to represent the country in the event.

=== Women ===
Name	Event	Result	Rank
Lisandra Guerra Rodriguez	Women's sprint		30
Lisandra Guerra Rodriguez	Women's 500 m time trial	34.692 sec	9
Lisandra Guerra Rodriguez	Women's keirin		13
Arlenis Sierra Canadilla	Women's scratch	—	7
Arlenis Sierra Canadilla	Women's points race	14 points	3
Marlies Mejías García	Women's omnium	124 points	9

== See also ==
- Australia at the UCI Track Cycling World Championships
- Netherlands at the UCI Track Cycling World Championships
