= 2007–08 UCI Track Cycling World Cup Classics – Round 3 – Women's points race =

Round 3 Women's points race
2007–08 UCI Track Cycling World Cup Classics, race 3/4

Race details
- Dates: 19 January 2008
- Stages: 1
- Distance: 20 km (12.43 mi)
- Winning time: 26:21.040

Medalists
	Gold	Jarmila Machačová (CZE)
	Silver	Min Hye Lee (KOR)
	Bronze	Li Yan (CHN)

The third round of the women's points race of the 2007–08 UCI Track Cycling World Cup Classics took place in Los Angeles, United States on 19 January 2008. 57 cyclists participated in the contest.

== Competition format ==
A points race is a race in which all riders start together and the object is to earn points during sprints or to lap the bunch.

The tournament consisted of three qualifying heats of 10 km (40 laps) with four sprints. The top eight cyclist of each heat advanced to the 20 km final (80 laps) with eight sprints.

== Schedule ==
Saturday 19 January
15:25-15:45 Qualifying heat 1
15:45-16:05 Qualifying heat 2
16:05-16:25 Qualifying heat 3
20:10-20:40 Final
21:05-21:10 Victory Ceremony

Schedule from Tissottiming.com

== Results ==
=== Qualifying ===
Qualifying Heat 1

Rank	Cyclist	Team	Points	Notes
1	Lada Kozlíková	Czech Republic	7	Q
2	Rebecca Quinn	SBW	6	Q
3	Evgenia Romanyuta	Russia	5	Q
4	Charlotte Becker	Germany	5	Q
5	Li Yan	China	3	Q
6	Martina Růžičková	ADP	3	Q
7	Cathy Moncassin Prime	France	3	Q
8	Song Hee Han	South Korea	3	Q
9	Tatiana Guderzo	Italy	2	
10	Gina Grain	Canada	2	
11	Yelyzaveta Bochkaryova	Ukraine	2	
12	Min Yang	GPC	1	
13	Jessie Daams	Belgium	1	
14	Inga Čilvinaitė	AGS	1	
15	Wan Yiu Wong	Hong Kong	0	
16	Kele Murdin	PRO	0	
17	Julia Bradley	TRC	0	
18	Dale Tye	New Zealand	0	
19	Jessie MacLean	VBR	0	

Results from Tissottiming.com.

Qualifying Heat 2

Rank	Cyclist	Team	Points	Notes
1	Pascale Jeuland	France	7	Q
2	Katherine Bates	Australia	6	Q
3	Eleonora Soldo	South Africa	5	Q
4	Min Hye Lee	South Korea	5	Q
5	Jarmila Machačová	Czech Republic	5	Q
6	Ellen van Dijk	Netherlands	4	Q
7	Marianne Vos	DSB	3	Q
8	Svetlana Pauliukaitė	Lithuania	3	Q
9	Gema Pascual Torrecilla	Spain	2	
10	Louise Moriarty	Ireland	2	
11	Christen King	United States	2	
12	Joanne Kiesanowski	New Zealand	0	
13	Belem Guerrero Méndez	Mexico	0	
14	Eneritz Iturriagaecheverria Mazaga	EUS	0	
15	Yumari González	Cuba	0	
16	Iona Wynter	Jamaica	0	
17	Paola Maria Salazar Rabbe	Guatemala	0	
18	Trine Schmidt	Denmark	0	
19	Diana Elmentaite	AGS	0	
	Stephanie Roorda	TRC		DNF

Results from Tissottiming.com.

Qualifying Heat 3

Rank	Cyclist	Team	Points	Notes
1	Belinda Goss	Australia	23	Q
2	Lauren Franges	United States	21	Q
3	Débora Gálves Lopez	Spain	20	Q
4	Vera Carrara	Italy	20	Q
5	Yoanka González Perez	Cuba	10	Q
6	Leire Olaberria Dorronsoro	EUS	6	Q
7	Jianling Wang	China	5	Q
8	Shelley Olds	PRO	5	Q
9	Christina Becker	Germany	5	
10	Olga Slyusareva	Russia	4	
11	Danielys García	Venezuela	2	
12	Andrea Wölfer	Switzerland	2	
13	Kelly Druyts	Belgium	1	
14	Theresa Cliff-Ryan	VBR	0	
15	Kate Cullen	SCO	0	
16	Neva Day	SBW	0	
17	Jessica Jurado	Mexico	0	
18	Paola Muñoz	Chile	0	

Results from Tissottiming.com.

=== Final ===
Rank	Cyclist	Team	Points
1st place, gold medalist(s)	Jarmila Machačová	Czech Republic	27
2nd place, silver medalist(s)	Min Hye Lee	South Korea	23
3rd place, bronze medalist(s)	Li Yan	China	12
4	Katherine Bates	Australia	9
5	Leire Olaberria Dorronsoro	EUS	8
6	Marianne Vos	DSB	8
7	Rebecca Quinn	SBW	7
8	Belinda Goss	Australia	6
9	Svetlana Pauliukaitė	Lithuania	5
10	Vera Carrara	Italy	5
11	Charlotte Becker	Germany	5
12	Ellen van Dijk	Netherlands	2
13	Lada Kozlíková	Czech Republic	2
14	Lauren Franges	United States	1
15	Evgenia Romanyuta	Russia	0
16	Jianling Wang	China	0
17	Pascale Jeuland	France	0
18	Débora Gálves Lopez	Spain	0
19	Martina Růžičková	ADP	0
20	Eleonora Soldo	South Africa	0
21	Cathy Moncassin Prime	France	0
22	Song Hee Han	South Korea	20
	Yoanka González Perez	Cuba	DNF
	Shelley Olds	PRO	DNF

Results from Tissottiming.com.

== World Cup Standings ==
World Cup standings after 3 of 4 2007–08 World Cup races.

Rank	Cyclist	Team	Round 1	Round 2	Round 3	Total points
1	Jarmila Machačová	Czech Republic	8		12	20
2	Li Yan	China	10		8	18
3	Marianne Vos	DSB		12	5	17
4	Rebecca Quinn	United States	7	6	4	17
5	Katherine Bates	TMT		8	7	15
6	Giorgia Bronzini	SAF	12			12
7	Min Hye Lee	South Korea			10	10
8	Yoanka González Perez	Cuba		10		10
9	Belinda Goss	Australia		7	3	10
10	Cathy Moncassin Prime	France	2	5		7
11	Pascale Jeuland	France	5	2		7
12	Leire Olaberria Dorronsoro	EUS			6	6
13	Olga Slyusareva	Russia	6			6
14	Adrie Visser	Netherlands	3	3		6
15	Sarah Hammer	United States		4		4
16	Charlotte Becker	RAD	4			4
17	Svetlana Pauliukaitė	Lithuania			2	2
18	Marlijn Binnendijk	Netherlands	1	1		2
19	Vera Carrara	Italy			1	1

Results from Tissottiming.com.

== See also ==
- 2007–08 UCI Track Cycling World Cup Classics – Round 3 – Women's individual pursuit
- 2007–08 UCI Track Cycling World Cup Classics – Round 3 – Women's scratch
