= 2008–09 UCI Track Cycling World Cup Classics – Round 2 – Women's points race =

Round 2 Women's points race
2008–2009 UCI Track Cycling World Cup Classics, race 2/5

Race details
- Dates: 21 November 2009
- Stages: 1
- Distance: 20 km (12.43 mi)
- Winning time: 26:34.875

Medalists
	Gold	Evgenia Romanyuta (RUS)
	Silver	Leire Olaberria Dorronsoro (ESP)
	Bronze	Belinda Goss (AUS)

The second round of the women's points race of the 2008–2009 UCI Track Cycling World Cup Classics took place in Melbourne, Australia on 21 November 2008. 39 athletes participated in the contest.

== Competition format ==
A points race is a race in which all riders start together and the object is to earn points during sprints or to lap the bunch.

The tournament consisted of two qualifying heats of 10 km (40 laps). The top twelve cyclist of each heat advanced to the 20 km final (80 laps).

== Schedule ==
Saturday 21 November
12:00-12:20 Qualifying, heat 1
13:20-12:40 Qualifying, heat 2
19:40-20:10 Final
20:40-20:45 Victory Ceremony

Schedule from Tissottiming.com

== Results ==
=== Qualifying ===
Qualifying Heat 1

Rank	Cyclist	Team	Points	Notes
1	Belinda Goss	Team Toshiba	8	Q
2	Evgenia Romanyuta	Russia	6	Q
3	Reum Na	South Korea	5	Q
4	Ashlee Ankudinoff	Australia	5	Q
5	Leire Olaberria Dorronsoro	Spain	5	Q
6	Rebecca Quinn	SBW	3	Q
7	Tess Downing	BTA	3	Q
8	Annalisa Cucionotta	Italy	3	Q
9	Wan Yiu Wong	Hong Kong	2	Q
10	Charlotte Becker	Germany	2	Q
11	Jolien D'Hoore	Belgium	1	Q
12	Rochelle Gilmore	HPT	1	Q
13	Elizabeth Armitstead	United Kingdom	0	
14	Svitlana Halyuk	Ukraine	0	
15	Katsiaryna Barazna	Belarus	0	
16	Monia Turin	Switzerland	0	
17	Sequoia Cooper	New Zealand	0	
18	Theresa Cliff-Ryan	Verducci Breakaway Racing	0	
19	Thatsani Wichana	Thailand	0	

Results from Tissottiming.com.

Qualifying Heat 2

Rank	Cyclist	Team	Points	Notes
1	Kelly Druyts	Belgium	10	Q
2	Andrea Wölfer	Switzerland	5	Q
3	Anastasia Chulkova	Russia	5	Q
4	Débora Gálves Lopez	Spain	5	Q
5	Josephine Tomic	Australia	3	Q
6	Shelley Olds	PRO	3	Q
7	Eleonora Soldo	Italy	3	Q
8	Chanpeng Nontasin	Thailand	3	Q
9	Malindi Maclean	New Zealand	2	Q
10	Ju Mi Lee	South Korea	2	Q
11	Katie Colclough	United Kingdom	1	Q
12	Lada Kozlíková	Czech Republic	1	Q
13	Ellen van Dijk	Netherlands	1	
14	Peta Mullens	HPT	0	
15	Xiao Juan Diao	Hong Kong	0	
16	Svetlana Paulikaite	Lithuania	0	
17	Pelin Cizgin	Austria	0	
18	Lesya Kalytovska	Ukraine	0	
	Valeria Müller	Argentina		DNF
	Iraida Garcia Ocasio	Cuba		DNS

Results from Tissottiming.com.

=== Final ===
Rank	Cyclist	Team	Points	Notes
1st place, gold medalist(s)	Evgenia Romanyuta	Russia	16	
2nd place, silver medalist(s)	Leire Olaberria Dorronsoro	Spain	15	
3rd place, bronze medalist(s)	Belinda Goss	Team Toshiba	11	
4	Rebecca Quinn	SBW	10	
5	Annalisa Cucionotta	Italy	7	
6	Jolien D'Hoore	Belgium	7	
7	Lada Kozlíková	Czech Republic	6	
8	Charlotte Becker	Germany	5	
9	Andrea Wölfer	Switzerland	5	
10	Ah Reum Na	South Korea	4	
11	Katie Colclough	United Kingdom	1	
12	Wan Yiu Wong	Hong Kong	1	
13	Shelley Olds	PR	0	
14	Rochelle Gilmore	HPT	0	
15	Débora Gálves Lopez	Spain	0	
16	Tess Downing	BTA	0	
17	Eleonora Soldo	Italy	0	
18	Chanpeng Nontasin	Thailand	0	
19	Kelly Druyts	Belgium	0	
20	Anastasia Chulkova	Russia	0	
21	Ashlee Ankudinoff	Australia	0	
22	Ju Mi Lee	South Korea	20	
	Malindi Maclean	New Zealand		DNF
	Josephine Tomic	Australia		DNS

Results from Tissottiming.com.

== See also ==
- 2008–2009 UCI Track Cycling World Cup Classics – Round 2 – Women's individual pursuit
- 2008–2009 UCI Track Cycling World Cup Classics – Round 2 – Women's scratch
- UCI Track Cycling World Cup Classics – Women's points race
