= 2008–09 UCI Track Cycling World Cup Classics – Round 2 – Women's scratch =

Round 2 Women's scratch
2008–2009 UCI Track Cycling World Cup Classics, race 2/5

Race details
- Dates: 20 November 2008
- Stages: 1
- Distance: 10 km (6.214 mi)

Medalists
	Gold	Elizabeth Armitstead (GBR)
	Silver	Annalisa Cucionotta (ITA)
	Bronze	Evgenia Romanyuta (RUS)

The second round of the women's scratch race of the 2008–2009 UCI Track Cycling World Cup Classics took place in Melbourne, Australia on 20 November 2008. 36 athletes participated in the contest.

== Competition format ==
A scratch race is a race in which all riders start together and the object is simply to be first over the finish line after a certain number of laps. There are no intermediate points or sprints.

The tournament consisted of two qualifying heats of 7.5 km (30 laps). The top twelve cyclist of each heat advanced to the 10 km final (40 laps).

== Schedule ==
Thursday 20 November
17:00-17:20 Qualifying
20:45-21:05 Final
21:30-21:35 Victory Ceremony

Schedule from Tissottiming.com

== Results ==
=== Qualifying ===
Qualifying Heat 1

Rank	Cyclist	Team	Notes
1	Charlotte Becker	Germany	Q
2	Ju Mi Lee	South Korea	Q
3	Kelly Druyts	Belgium	Q
4	Belinda Goss	Team Toshiba	Q
5	Penny Day	New Zealand	Q
6	Andrea Wölfer	Switzerland	Q
7	Shelley Olds	PRO	Q
8	Elizabeth Armitstead	United Kingdom	Q
9	Anastasia Chulkova	Russia	Q
10	Ana Usabiaga Balerdi	Spain	Q
11	Annalisa Cucionotta	Italy	Q
12	Thatsani Wichana	Thailand	Q
13	Ashlee Ankudinoff	Australia	
14	Wan Yiu Wong	Hong Kong	
15	Katsiaryna Barazna	Belarus	
16	Peta Mullens	HPT	
17	Pelin Cizgin	Austria	
18	Svetlana Paulikaite	Lithuania	

Results from Tissottiming.com.

Qualifying Heat 2

Rank	Cyclist	Team	Notes
1	Evgenia Romanyuta	Russia	Q
2	Leire Olaberria Dorronsoro	Spain	Q
3	Tess Downing	BTA	Q
4	Rebecca Quinn	SBW	Q
5	Rochelle Gilmore	HPT	Q
6	Malindi Maclean	New Zealand	Q
7	Ah Reum Na	South Korea	Q
8	Theresa Cliff-Ryan	Verducci Breakaway Racing	Q
9	Lesya Kalytovska	Ukraine	Q
10	Katie Colclough	United Kingdom	Q
11	Ellen van Dijk	Netherlands	Q
12	Eleonora Soldo	Italy	Q
13	Sarah Kent	Australia	
14	Monia Turin	Switzerland	
15	Sutharat Bonsawat	Thailand	
16	Xiao Juan Diao	Hong Kong	
17	Valeria Müller	Argentina	
	Lada Kozlíková	Czech Republic	REL

Results from Tissottiming.com.

=== Final ===
Rank	Cyclist	Team	Notes
1st place, gold medalist(s)	Elizabeth Armitstead	United Kingdom	
2nd place, silver medalist(s)	Annalisa Cucionotta	Italy	
3rd place, bronze medalist(s)	Evgenia Romanyuta	Russia	
4	Leire Olaberria Dorronsoro	Spain	
5	Malindi Maclean	New Zealand	
6	Rebecca Quinn	SBW	
7	Belinda Goss	Team Toshiba	
8	Ah Reum Na	South Korea	
9	Rochelle Gilmore	HPT	
10	Kelly Druyts	Belgium	
11	Shelley Olds	PRO	
12	Andrea Wölfer	Switzerland	
13	Tess Downing	BTA	
14	Eleonora Soldo	Italy	
15	Thatsani Wichana	Thailand	
16	Penny Day	New Zealand	
17	Anastasia Chulkova	Russia	
18	Ana Usabiaga Balerdi	Spain	
19	Theresa Cliff-Ryan	Verducci Breakaway Racing	
20	Ju Mi Lee	South Korea	
21	Ellen van Dijk	Netherlands	
22	Charlotte Becker	Germany	
23	Katie Colclough	United Kingdom	
	Lesya Kalytovska	Ukraine	DNF

Results from Tissottiming.com.

== See also ==
- 2008–2009 UCI Track Cycling World Cup Classics – Round 2 – Women's individual pursuit
- 2008–2009 UCI Track Cycling World Cup Classics – Round 2 – Women's points race
