= 2007–08 UCI Track Cycling World Cup Classics – Round 3 – Women's scratch =

Round 3 Women's scratch
2007–08 UCI Track Cycling World Cup Classics, race 3/4

Race details
- Dates: 18 January 2008
- Stages: 1
- Distance: 10 km (6.214 mi)

Medalists
	Gold	Charlotte Becker (GER)
	Silver	Evgenia Romanyuta (RUS)
	Bronze	Elena Tchalykh (RUS)

The third round of the women's scratch race of the 2007–08 UCI Track Cycling World Cup Classics took place in Los Angeles, United States on 18 January 2008. 50 cyclists participated in the contest.

== Competition format ==
A scratch race is a race in which all riders start together and the object is simply to be first over the finish line after a certain number of laps. There are no intermediate points or sprints.

The tournament consisted of three qualifying heats of 5 km (20 laps). The top eight cyclist of each heat advanced to the 10 km final (40 laps).

== Schedule ==
Friday 18 January
15:35-16:05 Qualifying
20:45-21:05 Final
21:30-21:35 Victory Ceremony

Schedule from Tissottiming.com

== Results ==
=== Qualifying ===
Qualifying Heat 1

Rank	Cyclist	Team	Notes
1	Yumari González	Cuba	Q
2	Marianne Vos	DSB	Q
3	Evelyn Arys	Belgium	Q
4	Evgenia Romanyuta	Russia	Q
5	Joanne Kiesanowski	New Zealand	Q
6	Belem Guerrero Méndez	Mexico	Q
7	Kate Cullen	SCO	Q
8	Eneritz Iturriagaecheverria Mazaga	EUS	Q
9	Paola Muñoz	Chile	
10	Danielys García	Venezuela	
11	Jenny Trew	TRC	
12	Lisa Gatto	Italy	
13	Neva Day	SBW	
14	Kele Murdin	PRO	
15	Jessie MacLean	VBR	
16	Paola Maria Salazar Rabbe	Guatemala	
17	Christina Becker	Germany	

Results from Tissottiming.com.

Qualifying Heat 2

Rank	Cyclist	Team	Notes
1	Ellen van Dijk	Netherlands	Q
2	Inga Čilvinaitė	AGS	Q
3	Rebecca Quinn	SBW	Q
4	Belinda Goss	Australia	Q
5	Trine Schmidt	Denmark	Q
6	Jarmila Machačová	Czech Republic	Q
7	Charlotte Becker	Germany	Q
8	Hyo Seong Noh	South Korea	Q
9	Christen King	United States	
10	Débora Gálves Lopez	Spain	
11	Martina Růžičková	ADP	
12	Iona Wynter	Jamaica	
13	Min Yang	GPC	
14	Jessica Jurado	Mexico	
15	Julia Bradley	TRC	
16	Karelia Judith Machado Jaimes	Venezuela	
17	Eleonora Soldo	South Africa	

Results from Tissottiming.com.

Qualifying Heat 3

Rank	Cyclist	Team	Laps down	Notes
1	Elena Tchalykh	Russia		Q
2	Lauren Franges	United States		Q
3	Seon Ha Ha	South Korea		Q
4	Shelley Olds	PRO	1	Q
5	Annalisa Cucionotta	Italy	1	Q
6	Gema Pascual Torrecilla	Spain	1	Q
7	Pascale Jeuland	France	1	Q
8	Theresa Cliff-Ryan	VBR	1	Q
9	Jolien D'Hoore	Belgium	1	
10	Leire Olaberria Dorronsoro	EUS	1	
11	Yoanka González Pérez	Cuba	1	
12	Wan Yiu Wong	Hong Kong	1	
13	Svitlana Halyuk	Ukraine	1	
14	Gina Grain	Canada	1	
15	Louise Moriarty	Ireland	1	
16	Andrea Wölfer	Switzerland	1	

Results from Tissottiming.com.

=== Final ===
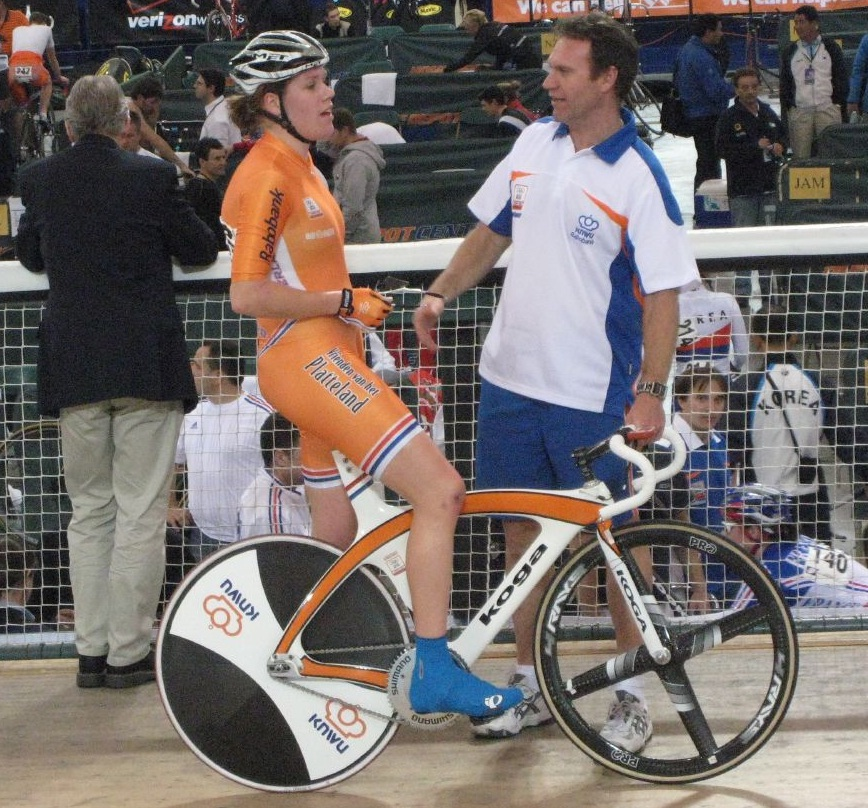
Ellen van Dijk after the race

Rank	Cyclist	Team	Laps down
1st place, gold medalist(s)	Charlotte Becker	Germany	
2nd place, silver medalist(s)	Evgenia Romanyuta	Russia	
3rd place, bronze medalist(s)	Elena Tchalykh	Russia	
4	Ellen van Dijk	Netherlands	
5	Trine Schmidt	Denmark	1
6	Yumari González	Cuba	1
7	Kate Cullen	SCO	1
8	Rebecca Quinn	SBW	1
9	Pascale Jeuland	France	1
10	Theresa Cliff-Ryan	VBR	1
11	Annalisa Cucionotta	Italy	1
12	Marianne Vos	DSB	1
13	Shelley Olds	PRO	1
14	Joanne Kiesanowski	New Zealand	1
15	Gema Pascual Torrecilla	Spain	1
16	Evelyn Arys	Belgium	1
17	Belinda Goss	Australia	1
18	Hyo Seong Noh	South Korea	1
19	Inga Čilvinaitė	AGS	1
20	Eneritz Iturriagaecheverria Mazaga	EUS	1
21	Lauren Franges	United States	1
22	Belem Guerrero Méndez	Mexico	1
23	Jarmila Machačová	Czech Republic	1
24	Seon Ha Ha	South Korea	2

Results from Tissottiming.com.

== World Cup Standings ==
World Cup standings after 3 of 4 2007–08 World Cup races.

Rank	Cyclist	Team	Round 1	Round 2	Round 3	Total points
1	Yumari González	Cuba	12	8	5	25
2	Evgenia Romanyuta	Russia	7		10	17
3	Belinda Goss	Australia	6	10		16
4	Charlotte Becker	RAD		2	12	14
5	Rebecca Quinn	United States	5	6	3	14
6	Annalisa Cucionotta	Italy	10	3		13
7	Marianne Vos	DSB		12		12
8	Gina Grain	Canada	2	7		9
9	Elena Tchalykh	Russia			8	8
10	Anastasia Chulkova	Russia	8			8
11	Ellen van Dijk	Netherlands			7	7
12	Pascale Jeuland	France	4	1	2	7
13	Trine Schmidt	Denmark			6	6
14	Iona Wynter	Jamaica		5		5
15	Kate Cullen	SCO			4	4
16	Song Hee Han	South Korea		4		4
17	Joanne Kiesanowski	New Zealand	3			3
18	Theresa Cliff-Ryan	VBR			1	1
19	Adrie Visser	Netherlands	1			1

Results from Tissottiming.com.

== See also ==
- 2007–08 UCI Track Cycling World Cup Classics – Round 3 – Women's individual pursuit
- 2007–08 UCI Track Cycling World Cup Classics – Round 3 – Women's points race
