= 2008 UCI Track Cycling World Championships – Women's scratch =

Women's scatch
2008 UCI Track Cycling World Championships

Race details
- Dates: 30 March 2008
- Stages: 1
- Distance: 10 km (6.214 mi)

Medalists
	Gold	Ellen van Dijk (the Netherlands)
	Silver	Yumari González (Cuba)
	Bronze	Belinda Goss (Australia)

The 2008 UCI Track Cycling World Championships – Women's scratch was the women's scratch race at 2008 UCI Track Cycling World Championships. It was one of the eight women's events, held at the Manchester Velodrome in Manchester, Great Britain on the fifth and final day of the Championships on 30 March 2008. It was the seventh women's scatch race appearance at the UCI Track Cycling World Championships. 21 women from 21 countries participated in the race.

After several attacks that did not come to anything Ellen van Dijk of the Netherlands struck out alone with less than eight laps to go. No one else reacted and she rode solo to the finish. The sprint of the peloton behind Van Dijk was won by Yumari González of Cuba who took the silver medal with Belinda Goss from Australia taking bronze.

== Qualification ==
Qualification for the race was restricted to one cyclist per nation for the countries in the Union Cycliste Internationale (UCI) individual standings as of 18 February 2008, after the fourth and final round of the 2007–08 UCI Track Cycling World Cup Classics. Additionally, one place was available at the B World Championship, one place at each continental championships and one wild card for nations that did not qualify through the UCI standing. National federations of the qualified countries selected the rider. The maximum quota of the event was set at 24 cyclists but only 21 cyclists were registered.

== Competition format ==
A scratch race is a race in which all riders start together and the object is to cross the finish line. The competition consisted on 40 laps, making a total of 10 km without intermediate points or sprints. There were no qualification rounds for this discipline so the event was run direct to the final.

== Schedule ==
Times are in British Summer Time (UTC+1)
Sunday 30 March
16:30-16:50 Final
17:15:-17:25 Victory Ceremony

== Pre-race favorites ==
Not all 2007–08 UCI Track Cycling World Cup Classics medalists could participate in the race because each qualified country was only allowed to select one rider. Beside that, not all countries selected their World Cup medalist, if they had one. The main favorite for the race was Yumari González from Cuba, the defending champion, who won the scratch race at the 2007 UCI Track Cycling World Championships and won the first World Cup race in Sydney and finished third in the second World Cup race in Beijing. The silver medalist of 2007, María Luisa Calle of Colombia, was also selected. The start list further included Belinda Goss of Australia, Jarmila Machačová from the Czech Republic and Annalisa Cucinotta from Italy who won all three a silver medal during a World Cup race. The Netherlands did not select Marianne Vos, who won two of the four World Cup races, but selected Ellen van Dijk instead.

== Race ==
The race started at 16:30 British Summer Time (UTC+1) and was scheduled to last until 16:50. 21 women form 21 countries took part in the race.

The race had several attacks, the first meaningful one coming in only lap five from Aksana Papko of Belarus in an early bid to match her countryman Aliaksandr Lisouski's victory in the men's race on day one. She was chased down by a small group that included Svetlana Paulikaite of Lithuania, Svitlana Halyuk of Ukraine and Ellen van Dijk of the Netherlands. The rest of the bunch was very attentive at this early stage and they were soon back together. Paulikaite struck out alone, but her effort did not come to anything. A crash in the middle period of the race took down Catherine Cheatley of New Zealand and Spain's Gema Pascual Torrecilla after a touch of wheels near the back. Cheatley rejoined after a few minutes, but Torrecilla pulled out having fallen more heavily. More attacks continued, but all were reeled. With less than eight laps to go, Van Dijk struck out alone and no one else reacted. She overtook the Danish rider Trine Schmidt from an earlier escape and had soon almost half lap lead. The rest of the riders did not react and looked to each other. Despite having almost half a lap on the rest of the bunch, Van Dijk refused to start getting complacent and kept going. When a chase did materialise, it was too late and Van Dijk finished alone with a considerable gap to take the gold medal and the rainbow jersey. Behind Van Dijk the sprint was won by the 2007 champion Yumari González Valdivieso of Cuba, ahead of Belinda Goss from Australia. Annalisa Cucinotta of Italy was fourth and Rebecca Quinn from the United States of America finished fifth.

== Final classifications ==
The victory ceremony was held at 17:15 British Summer Time (UTC+1). The winner was awarded the rainbow jersey and the top three riders got flowers and respectively a gold, silver and bronze medal.

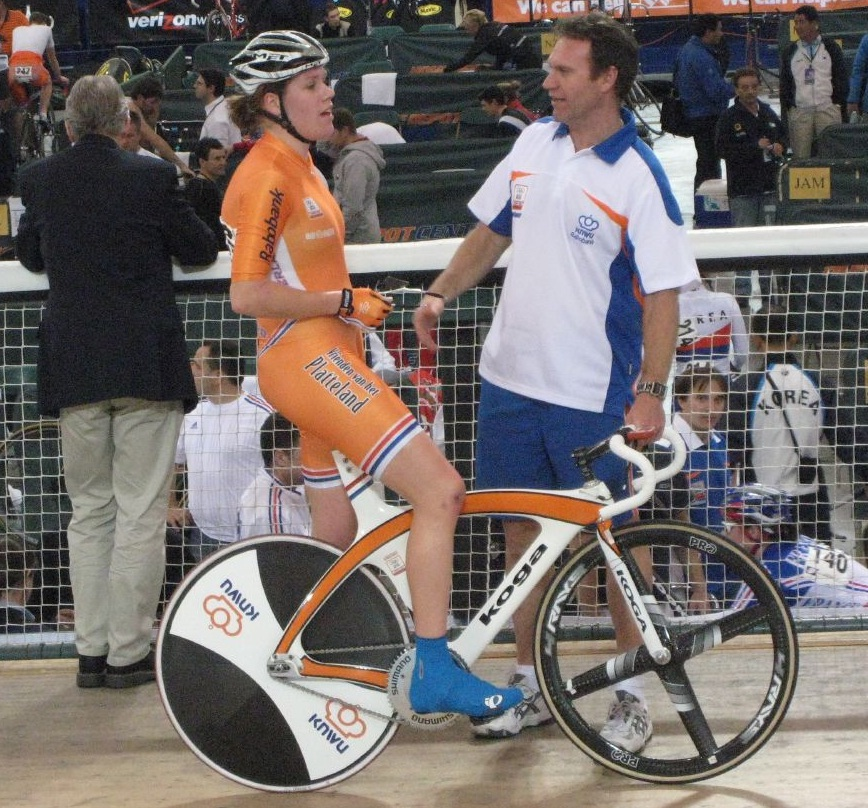
Ellen van Dijk after a World Cup scratch race in January 2008

Rank	Name	Country
1st place, gold medalist(s)	Ellen van Dijk	Netherlands
2nd place, silver medalist(s)	Yumari González	Cuba
3rd place, bronze medalist(s)	Belinda Goss	Australia
4	Annalisa Cucinotta	Italy
5	Rebecca Quinn	United States
6	Pascale Jeuland	France
7	Lizzie Armitstead	United Kingdom
8	María Luisa Calle	Colombia
9	Elke Gebhardt	Germany
10	Catherine Cheatley	New Zealand
11	Olga Slyusareva	Russia
12	Svitlana Halyuk	Ukraine
13	Jarmila Machačová	Czech Republic
14	Gina Grain	Canada
15	Aksana Papko	Belgium
16	Wan Yiu Wong	Hong Kong
17	Jessica Jurado	Mexico
18	Svetlana Paulikaite	Lithuania
19	Trine Schmidt	Denmark
DNF	Gema Pascual Torrecilla	Spain
DNF	Wathinee Luekajorh	Thailand

DNF = did not finish

== Medalists reactions ==
Ellen van Dijk (Netherlands)

"I was never World champion so it is my biggest victory so far! I was focused on the individual pursuit, everything for me was on that. My individual pursuit was good, but I was fifth and just missed the finals. I was very disappointed because I also missed the Olympic Games, because I only started riding [world cups] on the track four months ago. I didn't have enough points to ride in the individual pursuit in the Olympics." About the scratch race she continued: "My plan was to attack about 10 laps from the finish, I wanted to go when the speed was a bit lower. I did it about eight laps before the finish. I was surprised, but every country has just one rider so they don't work together. That was better for me to ride away. I didn't look behind, just once", she added. "I knew I had to give it everything and if there was no gap, then there was no gap. But it worked out well." Despite having quite a considerable gap coming into the final lap, Van Dijk refused to believe that the race was won until the very end. She detailed the point at which she realised that she was definitely going to triumph. "Just 100 metres before the finish", she said. "I didn't know how big the gap was [before then], I didn't look back, I was just focused on riding hard and getting everything out." A few days on from the frustration of non-qualification, her new rainbow jersey and gold medal provide her with a great deal of compensation. "I was really, really disappointed with that", she confirmed. "But this makes up for it."

Yumari González (Cuba)

"The race was very fast." She told the assembled media. "I didn't feel very good but at the end I was able to get the silver medal so I am happy about that."

Belinda Goss (Australia)

"I'm certainly stoked by the result. It is such a great improvement on last year. It would have been great to have got gold, the top prize, but I am really happy. It has been a long wait. I had to put it in my head that I'd get in some training this week, get a bit fitter. But I am really happy with myself; things have been going well for me. I rode well in Europe last year."
