= 2009 UCI Track Cycling World Championships – Women's points race =

Rainbow jersey

The Women's Points Race was one of the 9 women's events at the 2009 UCI Track Cycling World Championships, held in Pruszków, Poland

22 Cyclists from 22 countries participated in the contest. Because of the number of entries, there were no qualification rounds for this discipline. Consequently, the event was run direct to the final.

== Final ==
The Final and only race was run on 29 March. The competition consisted on 100 laps, making a total of 25 km with 10 sprints.

Four riders crashed when Belinda Goss of Australia moved up the banking, Aksana Papko of Belarus veered to avoid hitting her rear wheel but high-sided her bicycle, bringing down two other riders in the process, Pascale Jeuland of France and Olga Slyusareva of Russia who had three points and was placed fifth at the time. The American rider Shelley Olds was lucky not to come down also as she was struck by one of the falling riders but managed to keep her balance, although she later crashed when she was moving down the track at speed, clipping the rear wheel of the British rider Elizabeth Armitstead, Armitstead luckily stayed upright to take the bronze medal behind Yumari González of Cuba. Giorgia Bronzini of Italy won the gold medal, having ridden consistently and featured in all but two of the sprints.

Elapsed Time=32:41.800 Average Speed=45.876 km/h

| Rank | Name | Country | Sprint Number | | | | | | | | | | Finish Order | Lap Points | | | Total Points |
| Rank | Name | Country | 1 | 2 | 3 | 4 | 5 | 6 | 7 | 8 | 9 | 10 | Finish Order | + | – | Balance | Total Points |
|---|---|---|---|---|---|---|---|---|---|---|---|---|---|---|---|---|---|
| | Giorgia Bronzini | Italy | 3 | 2 | | | 3 | 1 | 2 | 1 | 5 | 1 | 4 | | | | 18 |
| | Yumari González | Cuba | 5 | | | | 5 | | | | | 5 | 1 | | | | 15 |
| | Elizabeth Armitstead | Great Britain | | 3 | | | | 2 | 3 | | 3 | 2 | 3 | | | | 13 |
| 4 | Wang Cui | China | | | | 2 | | 5 | | 5 | | | 17 | | | | 12 |
| 5 | Belinda Goss | Australia | | 5 | | | 1 | | | | 1 | 3 | 2 | | | | 10 |
| 6 | Svetlana Paulikaite | Lithuania | 2 | | 2 | | | | 5 | | | | 18 | | | | 9 |
| 7 | Leire Olaberria | Spain | 1 | | 5 | | | | | 2 | | | 8 | | | | 8 |
| 8 | Jarmila Machačová | Czech Republic | | 1 | | 5 | | | 1 | | | | 13 | | | | 7 |
| 9 | Wong Wan Yiu | Hong Kong | | | | | | 3 | | 3 | | | 6 | | | | 6 |
| 10 | Elke Gebhardt | Germany | | | 1 | | 2 | | | | | | 5 | | | | 3 |
| 11 | Tara Whitten | Canada | | | | 3 | | | | | | | 9 | | | | 3 |
| 12 | Lauren Ellis | New Zealand | | | | 1 | | | | | 2 | | 15 | | | | 3 |
| 13 | Andrea Wölfer | Switzerland | | | | | | | | | | | 7 | | | | 0 |
| 14 | María Luisa Calle | Colombia | | | | | | | | | | | 10 | | | | 0 |
| 15 | Ellen van Dijk | Netherlands | | | | | | | | | | | 11 | | | | 0 |
| 16 | Shelley Olds | United States | | | | | | | | | | | 12 | | | | 0 |
| 17 | Jolien D'Hoore | Belgium | | | | | | | | | | | 14 | | | | 0 |
| 18 | Chanpeng Nontasin | Thailand | | | | | | | | | | | 16 | | | | 0 |
| DNF | Olga Slyusareva | Russia | | | 3 | | | | | | | | | | | | |
| DNF | Pascale Jeuland | France | | | | | | | | | | | | | | | |
| DNF | Małgorzata Wojtyra | Poland | | | | | | | | | | | 19 | | -40 | -40 | |
| DNF | Aksana Papko | Belarus | | | | | | | | | | | | | | | |
