= 2008 UCI Track Cycling World Championships – Women's points race =

Rainbow jersey

The Women's Points Race was one of the 8 women's events at the 2008 UCI Track Cycling World Championships, held in Manchester, United Kingdom.

22 Cyclists from 22 countries participated in the contest. Because of the number of entries, there were no qualification rounds for this discipline. Consequently, the event was run direct to the final.

== Final ==
The Final and only race was run on March 29. The competition consisted on 100 laps, making a total of 25 km with 10 sprints.

Elapsed Time=31:58.990 Average Speed=46.899 km/h

Rank	Name	Country	Sprint Number										Finish Order	Lap Points			Total Points
Rank	Name	Country	1	2	3	4	5	6	7	8	9	10	Finish Order	+	–	Balance	Total Points
	Marianne Vos	Netherlands					5			3		5	1	20		20	33
	Trine Schmidt	Denmark		5										20		20	25
	Vera Carrara	Italy												20		20	20
4	Leire Olaberria	Spain	5					5			1						11
5	Yoanka González	Cuba				5					5						10
6	Svetlana Paulikaite	Lithuania		3	5												8
7	Olga Slyusareva	Russia		2						2		3	2				7
8	Rebecca Quinn	United States		1	3	1						2	3				7
9	Pascale Jeuland	France	1		2	2						1	4				6
10	Jarmila Machačová	Czech Republic				3		3									6
11	Wong Wan Yiu	Hong Kong						1	5								6
12	Katherine Bates	Australia	3				1				2						6
13	Li Yan	China								5							5
14	Belem Guerrero Méndez	Mexico					2		3								5
15	María Luisa Calle	Colombia			1				1		3						5
16	Charlotte Becker	Germany					3			1							4
17	Gina Grain	Canada								2							2
18	Lesya Kalytovska	Ukraine							2								2
19	Elizabeth Armitstead	Great Britain															0
20	Aksana Papko	Belarus															0
21	Catherine Cheatley	New Zealand															0
22	Lee Min Hye	South Korea	2												-20	-20	-18
