= 2009 UCI Track Cycling World Championships – Women's scratch =

Women's scatch race
2009 UCI Track Cycling World Championships
- Rainbow jersey

Race details
- Dates: 27 March 2009
- Stages: 1
- Distance: 10 km (6.214 mi)

Medalists
	Gold	Yumari González (Cuba)
	Silver	Lizzie Armitstead (United Kingdom)
	Bronze	Belinda Goss (Australia)

The Women's Scratch was one of the 8 women's events at the 2009 UCI Track Cycling World Championships, held in Pruszków, Poland.

20 Cyclists from 20 countries participated in the race. Because of the number of entries, there were no qualification rounds for this discipline. The competition consisted of 40 laps, making a total of 10 km and was run on 27 March 2009. Ellen van Dijk could not cement her reputation as the 2008 World champion and it was the 2007 World champion and 2008 silver medalist Yumari González from Cuba who won the scratch race with Elizabeth Armitstead and Belinda Goss finishing in second and third position.

== Final ==
Rank	Name	Country			
	Yumari González	Cuba			
	Lizzie Armitstead	United Kingdom			
	Belinda Goss	Australia			
4	Giorgia Bronzini	Italy			
5	Pascale Jeuland	France			
6	Ellen van Dijk	Netherlands			
7	Kelly Druyts	Belgium			
8	Andrea Wölfer	Switzerland			
9	Sun Feiyan	China			
10	Jarmila Machačová	Czech Republic			
11	Lauren Ellis	New Zealand			
12	Shelley Olds	United States			
13	Alena Amialiusik	Belarus			
14	María Luisa Calle	Colombia			
15	Tara Whitten	Canada	16	Małgorzata Wojtyra	Poland
17	Wichana Thatsani	Thailand			
18	Leire Olaberria Dorronsoro	Spain			
19	Diao Xiao Juan	Hong Kong			
DNF	Evgenia Romanyuta	Russia			
