= 2006 UCI Track Cycling World Championships – Women's points race =

Rainbow jersey

The Women's Points Race was one of the 6 women's events at the 2006 UCI Track Cycling World Championships, held in Bordeaux, France.

22 Cyclists from 22 countries participated in the race. Because of the number of entries, there were no qualification rounds for this discipline. Consequently, the event was run direct to the final.

== Final ==
The Final and only race was run at 18:45 on April 14. The competition consisted on 100 laps, making a total of 25 km with 10 sprints.

Elapsed Time=33:02.990 Average Speed=45.386 km/h

Rank	Name	Country	Sprint Number										Finish Order	Lap Points			Total Points
Rank	Name	Country	1	2	3	4	5	6	7	8	9	10	Finish Order	+	-	Balance	Total Points
	Vera Carrara	Italy				5					5	5	1	20		20	35
	Olga Slyusareva	Russia	1			1	2	5	1	2		3	2	20		20	35
	Gema Pascual Torrecilla	Spain		2		3			2		3	2	3	20		20	32
4	Yoanka González	Cuba			5					5	2		9	20		20	32
5	Katherine Bates	Australia	2		2			1		3	1		17	20		20	29
6	Lada Kozlíková	Czech Republic	5					2					6	20		20	27
7	María Luisa Calle	Colombia				2						1	4	20		20	23
8	Yelyzaveta Bochkaryova	Ukraine											7	20		20	20
9	Sarah Hammer	United States		3	3				3				12				9
10	Adrie Visser	Netherlands		5			1						15				6
11	Elke Gebhardt	Germany					5						10				5
12	Tatsiana Sharakova	Belarus							5				21				5
13	Gina Grain	Canada					3						5				3
14	Wang Jianling	China						3					13				3
15	Pascale Schnider	Switzerland	3										14				3
16	Joanne Kiesanowski	New Zealand			1					1			8				2
17	Pascale Jeuland	France											11				0
18	Maria Tzoumanika	Greece											16				0
19	Jona Wynter	Jamaica											19				0
20	Nikki Harris	United Kingdom											22	20	20	0	0
21	Karen Verbeek	Belgium		1									20		20	-20	-19
22	Karolina Janik	Poland											18		20	-20	-20
