= 2006 UCI Track Cycling World Championships – Women's scratch =

Women's scratch
2005 UCI Track Cycling World Championships

Race details
- Dates: April 16, 2006
- Stages: 1
- Distance: 10 km (6.2 mi)

Medalists
	Gold	María Luisa Calle (COL)
	Silver	Gina Grain (CAN)
	Bronze	Olga Slyusareva (RUS)

The Women's Scratch is one of the 6 women's events at the 2006 UCI Track Cycling World Championships, held in Bordeaux, France.

20 Cyclists from 20 countries participated in the contest. Because of the number of entries, there were no qualification rounds for this discipline. Consequently, the event was run direct to the final.

== Final ==
The Final and only race was run at 14:30 on April 16. The competition consisted on 40 laps, making a total of 10 km.

Rank	Name	Country
	María Luisa Calle	Colombia
	Gina Grain	Canada
	Olga Slyusareva	Russia
4	Rebecca Quinn	United States
5	Elke Gebhardt	Germany
6	Annalisa Cucinotta	Italy
7	Lada Kozlíková	Czech Republic
8	Adrie Visser	Netherlands
9	Joanne Kiesanowski	New Zealand
10	Katherine Bates	Australia
11	Gema Pascual Torrecilla	Spain
12	Pascale Schnider	Switzerland
13	Maria Tzoumanika	Greece
14	Karen Verbeek	Belgium
15	Katarzyna Jagusiak	Poland
16	Nikki Harris	United Kingdom
17	Jona Wynter	Jamaica
18	Elodie Henriette	France
19	Yoanka González Pérez	Cuba
20	Lyudmyla Vypyraylo	Ukraine
