= 2008–09 UCI Track Cycling World Cup Classics – Round 2 – Women's individual pursuit =

Round 2 Women's individual pursuit
2008–2009 UCI Track Cycling World Cup Classics, race 2/5

Race details
- Dates: 20 November 2008
- Stages: 1
- Distance: 3 km (1.864 mi)
- Winning time: 3:41.183

Medalists
	Gold	Joanna Rowsell (GBR)
	Silver	Josephine Tomic (AUS)
	Bronze	Lada Kozlíková (CZE)

The second round of the women's individual pursuit of the 2008–2009 UCI Track Cycling World Cup Classics took place in Melbourne, Australia on 20 November 2008. 14 athletes participated in the contest.

== Competition format ==
The women's individual pursuit consists of a 3 km time trial race between two riders, starting on opposite sides of the track. If one rider catches the other, the race is over.

The tournament consisted of an initial qualifying round. The top two riders in the qualifying round advanced to the gold medal match and the third and fourth riders advanced to the bronze medal race.

== Schedule ==
Thursday 20 November
13:35-14:15 Qualifying
20:15-20:30 Finals
20:40:-20:45 Victory Ceremony

Schedule from Tissottiming.com

== Results ==
=== Qualifying ===
Rank	Cyclist	Team	Time	Speed	Notes
1	Joanna Rowsell	United Kingdom	3:38.088	49.521	Q
2	Josephine Tomic	Australia	3:38.138	49.509	Q
3	Lada Kozlíková	Czech Republic	3:38.454	49.438	q
4	Ellen van Dijk	Netherlands	3:39.558	49.189	q
5	Charlotte Becker	Germany	3:40.695	48.936	
6	Tess Downing	BTA	3:43.205	48.386	
7	Svitlana Halyuk	Ukraine	3:44.654	48.073	
8	Leire Olaberria Dorronsoro	Spain	3:45.453	47.903	
9	Lauren Ellis	New Zealand	3:48.259	47.314	
10	Jolien D'Hoore	Belgium	3:48.307	47.304	
11	Viktoriya Kondel	Russia	3:48.766	47.209	
12	Valeria Müller	Argentina	3:57.102	45.550	
13	Chanpeng Nontasin	Thailand	3:59.794	45.038	
14	Katsiaryna Barazna	Belarus	4:06.028	43.897	

Results from Tissottiming.com.

=== Finals ===
==== Final bronze medal race ====
Rank	Cyclist	Team	Time	Speed
3rd place, bronze medalist(s)	Lada Kozlíková	Czech Republic	3:40.793	48.914
4	Ellen van Dijk	Netherlands	3:43.028	48.424

Results from Tissottiming.com.

==== Final gold medal race ====
Rank	Cyclist	Team	Time	Speed
1st place, gold medalist(s)	Joanna Rowsell	United Kingdom	3:41.183	48.828
2nd place, silver medalist(s)	Josephine Tomic	Australia	3:42.692	48.497

Results from Tissottiming.com.

== World Cup Standings ==
General standings after 2 of 5 2008–2009 World Cup races.

Rank	Cyclist	Team	Round 1	Round 2	Total points
1	Joanna Rowsell	Team 100% ME	8	12	20
2	Charlotte Becker	Germany	7	6	13
3	Wendy Houvenaghel	United Kingdom	12		12
4	Josephine Tomic	Australia		10	10
5	Tara Whitten	Canada	10		10
6	Lada Kozlíková	Czech Republic		8	8
7	Ellen van Dijk	Netherlands		7	7
8	Svitlana Halyuk	Ukraine	3	4	7
9	Tatsiana Sharakova	Belarus	6		6
10	Tess Downing	BTA		5	5
11	Pascale Jeuland	France	5		5
12	Jolien D'Hoore	Belgium	4	1	5
13	Leire Olaberria Dorronsoro	Spain		3	3
14	Lauren Ellis	New Zealand		2	2
15	Edyta Jasińska	Poland	2		2
16	Ana Usabiaga Balerdi	EUS	1		1

Results from Tissottiming.com.

== See also ==
- 2008–2009 UCI Track Cycling World Cup Classics – Round 2 – Women's points race
- 2008–2009 UCI Track Cycling World Cup Classics – Round 2 – Women's scratch
- UCI Track Cycling World Cup Classics – Women's individual pursuit
