= 2004 UCI Track Cycling World Championships – Women's scratch =

Melbourne women's events

Rainbow jersey

The Women's Scratch was one of the 6 women's events at the 2004 UCI Track Cycling World Championships, held in Melbourne, Australia.

18 Cyclists from 17 countries participated in the contest. Because of the number of entries, there were no qualification rounds for this discipline. Consequently, the event was run direct to the final.

== Final ==
The Final and only race was run at 13:10 on May 30. The competition consisted on 40 laps, making a total of 10 km.

Rank	Name	Country
	Yoanka González	Cuba
	Katherine Bates	Australia
	Mandy Poitras	Canada
4	Rebecca Quinn	United States
5	María Luisa Calle	Colombia
6	Kyriaki Kostantinidiou	Greece
7	Juliette Vandekerckhove	France
8	Giorgia Bronzini	Italy
9	Lada Kozlíková	Ukraine
10	Adrie Visser	Netherlands
11	Hanka Kupfernagel	Germany
12	Sarah Ulmer	New Zealand
13	Lyudmyla Vypyraylo	Czech Republic
DNF	Rochelle Gilmore	Australia
DNF	Gema Pascual	Spain
DNF	Gu Sung Eun	South Korea
DNF	Belem Guerrero Méndez	Mexico
