= 2009–10 UCI Track Cycling World Cup Classics – Round 1 – Women's team pursuit =

Round 1 – Women's team pursuit
2009–2010 UCI Track Cycling World Cup Classics, race 1/4

Race details
- Dates: 1 November 2009
- Stages: 1
- Distance: 3 km (1.864 mi)
- Winning time: 3:21.875

Medalists
	Gold	United Kingdom; Lizzie Armitstead; Wendy Houvenaghel; Joanna Rowsell
	Silver	Germany; Lisa Brennauer; Verena Joos; Madeleine Sandig
	Bronze	Australia; Tess Downing; Belinda Goss; Josephine Tomic

The first round of the women's team pursuit of the 2009–2010 UCI Track Cycling World Cup Classics took place in Manchester, Great Britain on 1 November 2009. 12 teams participated in the contest.

== Competition format ==
The women's team pursuit race consists of a 3 km race between two teams of three cyclists, starting on opposite sides of the track. If one team catches the other, the race is over.

The tournament consisted of an initial qualifying round. The top two teams in the qualifying round advanced to the gold medal match and the third and fourth teams advanced to the bronze medal race.

== Schedule ==
Thursday 1 November
11:00–12:10 Qualifying
15:59–16:14 Finals
16:32–16:40 Victory Ceremony

Schedule from Tissottiming.com

== Results ==
=== Qualifying ===
Rank	Country	Cyclists	Result	Notes
1	United Kingdom	Lizzie Armitstead; Wendy Houvenaghel; Joanna Rowsell	3:23.436	Q
2	Germany	Lisa Brennauer; Verena Joos; Madeleine Sandig	3:27.482	Q
3	Australia	Tess Downing; Belinda Goss; Josephine Tomic	3:28.751	q
4	Netherlands	Ellen van Dijk; Vera Koedooder; Amy Pieters	3:30.819	q
5	Belgium	Jessie Daams; Jolien D'Hoore; Kelly Druyts	3:32.889	
6	France	Sophie Creux; Fiona Dutriaux; Pascale Jeuland	3:34.912	
7	Russia	Victoria Kondel; Alena Prudnikova; Evgenia Romanyuta	3:35.057	
8	Lithuania	Svetlana Pauliukaitė; Aleksandra Sošenko; Aušrinė Trebaitė	3:37.895	
9	Poland	Edyte Jasinska; Katarzyna Pawłowska; Małgorzata Wojtyra	3:37.930	
10	Gruppo Sportivo Fiamme Azzurre	Monia Baccaille; Tatiana Guderzo; Marta Tagliaferro	3:39.992	
11	Rodin	Skye Lee Armstrong; Rochelle Gilmore; Lotte Van Hoek	3:45.196	
12	Mexico	Jessica Fernanda Jurado; Mayra Del Rocio Rocha; Estefany Marisol Tinajero Cobos	4:04.254	

Results from Tissottiming.com.

=== Finals ===
==== Final bronze medal race ====
Rank	Team	Cyclists	Result	Notes
3rd place, bronze medalist(s)	Australia	Tess Downing; Belinda Goss; Josephine Tomic	3:28.005	
4	Netherlands	Ellen van Dijk; Vera Koedooder; Amy Pieters	3:31.005	

Results from Tissottiming.com.

==== Final gold medal race ====
Rank	Team	Cyclists	Result	Notes
1st place, gold medalist(s)	United Kingdom	Lizzie Armitstead; Wendy Houvenaghel; Joanna Rowsell	3:21.875	
2nd place, silver medalist(s)	Germany	Lisa Brennauer; Verena Joos; Madeleine Sandig	3:26.403	

Results from Tissottiming.com.
