= 2007–08 UCI Track Cycling World Cup Classics – Round 3 – Women's individual pursuit =

Round 3 Women's individual pursuit
2007–08 UCI Track Cycling World Cup Classics, race 3/4

Race details
- Dates: 18 January 2008
- Stages: 1
- Distance: 3 km (1.864 mi)
- Winning time: 3:39.917

Medalists
	Gold	Lesya Kalytovska (UKR)
	Silver	María Luisa Calle (COL)
	Bronze	Sarah Hammer (USA)

The third round of the women's individual pursuit of the 2007–08 UCI Track Cycling World Cup Classics took place in Los Angeles, United States on 18 January 2008. 29 athletes participated in the contest.

== Competition format ==
The women's individual pursuit consists of a 3 km time trial race between two riders, starting on opposite sides of the track. If one rider catches the other, the race is over.

The tournament consisted of an initial qualifying round. The top two riders in the qualifying round advanced to the gold medal match and the third and fourth riders advanced to the bronze medal race.

== Schedule ==
Friday 18 January
10:10-11:35 Qualifying
19:10-19:25 Finals
20:25:-20:30 Victory Ceremony

Schedule from Tissottiming.com

== Results ==
=== Qualifying ===
Rank	Cyclist	Team	Time	Speed	Notes
1	Lesya Kalytovska	Ukraine	3:38.797	49.360	Q
2	María Luisa Calle Williams	Colombia	3:38.869	49.344	Q
3	Lada Kozlíková	Czech Republic	3:38.925	49.331	q
4	Sarah Hammer	OPC	3:41.006	48.867	q
5	Kristin Armstrong	United States	3:41.016	48.865	
6	Vilija Sereikaitė	SAF	3:41.727	48.708	
7	Ellen van Dijk	Netherlands	3:43.105	48.407	
8	Katherine Bates	Australia	3:43.168	48.394	
9	Tara Whitten	Canada	3:43.420	48.339	
10	Karin Thürig	Switzerland	3:44.166	48.178	
11	Verena Joos	Germany	3:45.527	47.887	
12	Olga Slyusareva	Russia	3:46.133	47.759	
13	Min Hye Lee	South Korea	3:46.729	47.633	
14	Trine Schmidt	Denmark	3:48.726	47.218	
15	Cathy Moncassin Prime	France	3:49.067	47.147	
16	Martina Růžičková	ADP	3:49.175	47.125	
17	Marianne Vos	Team DSB Bank	3:49.452	47.068	
18	Leire Olaberria Dorronsoro	EUS	3:49.839	46.989	
19	Tatiana Guderzo	Italy	3:50.147	46.926	
20	Dale Tye	New Zealand	3:53.784	46.196	
21	Svetlana Pauliukaitė	Lithuania	3:54.345	46.085	
22	Diana Elmentaite	AGS	3:54.829	45.990	
23	Gema Pascual Torrecilla	Spain	3:57.240	45.523	
24	Jessie MacLean	VBR	3:57.659	45.443	
25	Neva Day	SBW	3:58.666	45.251	
26	Julia Bradley	TRC	4:00.781	44.854	
27	Jessie Daams	Belgium	4:04.348	44.199	
28	Rui Juan Liu	GPC	4:06.342	43.841	
29	Paola Maria Salazar Rabbe	Guatemala	4:21.558	41.291	

Results from Tissottiming.com.

=== Finals ===
==== Final bronze medal race ====
Rank	Cyclist	Team	Time	Speed
3rd place, bronze medalist(s)	Sarah Hammer	OPC	3:38.001	49.541
4	Lada Kozlíková	Czech Republic	3:40.760	48.921

Results from Tissottiming.com.

==== Final gold medal race ====
Rank	Cyclist	Team	Time	Speed
1st place, gold medalist(s)	Lesya Kalytovska	Ukraine	3:39.917	49.109
2nd place, silver medalist(s)	María Luisa Calle Williams	Colombia	3:41.904	48.669

Results from Tissottiming.com.

== World Cup Standings ==
World Cup standings after 3 of 4 2007-08 World Cup races.

Rank	Cyclist	Team	Round 1	Round 2	Round 3	Total points
1	Katie Mactier	Australia	12	12		24
2	Sarah Hammer	OPC	6	8	8	22
3	Vilija Sereikaitė	SAF	10	6	5	21
4	Lesya Kalytovska	Ukraine	2	3	12	17
5	Karin Thürig	Switzerland	8	7	1	16
6	Rebecca Romero	United Kingdom	3	10		13
7	María Luisa Calle	Colombia	1		10	11
8	Wendy Houvenaghel	SIS	7	4		11
9	Verena Joos	Germany	4	5		9
10	Lada Kozlíková	Czech Republic			7	7
11	Alison Shanks	New Zealand	5	2		7
12	Kristin Armstrong	United States			6	6
13	Ellen van Dijk	Netherlands			4	4
14	Katherine Bates	Australia			3	3
15	Tara Whitten	Canada		1	2	3

Results from Tissottiming.com.

== See also ==
- 2007–08 UCI Track Cycling World Cup Classics – Round 3 – Women's points race
- 2007–08 UCI Track Cycling World Cup Classics – Round 3 – Women's scratch
- UCI Track Cycling World Cup Classics – Women's individual pursuit
