= UCI Track Cycling World Championships – Women's scratch =

The UCI Track Cycling World Championships – Women's scratch is the women's world championship scratch race event held annually at the UCI Track Cycling World Championships. The event was first introduced in 2002. Kirsten Wild of the Netherlands and Yumari González of Cuba have won the title three times.

== Medalists ==
Championship	Winner	Runner-up	Third
2002 Copenhagen	Lada Kozlíková (CZE)	Rochelle Gilmore (AUS)	Olga Sliusareva (RUS)
2003 Stuttgart	Olga Sliusareva (RUS)	Rochelle Gilmore (AUS)	Adrie Visser (NED)
2004 Melbourne	Yoanka González (CUB)	Mandy Poitras (CAN)	Olga Sliusareva (RUS)
2005 Los Angeles	Olga Sliusareva (RUS)	Katherine Bates (AUS)	Liudmyla Vypyrailo (UKR)
2006 Bordeaux	María Luisa Calle (COL)	Gina Grain (CAN)	Olga Sliusareva (RUS)
2007 Palma de Mallorca	Yumari González (CUB)	María Luisa Calle (COL)	Adrie Visser (NED)
2008 Manchester	Ellen van Dijk (NED)	Yumari González (CUB)	Belinda Goss (AUS)
2009 Pruszków	Yumari González (CUB)	Elizabeth Armitstead (GBR)	Belinda Goss (AUS)
2010 Ballerup	Pascale Jeuland (FRA)	Yumari González (CUB)	Belinda Goss (AUS)
2011 Apeldoorn	Marianne Vos (NED)	Katherine Bates (AUS)	Danielle King (GBR)
2012 Melbourne	Katarzyna Pawłowska (POL)	Melissa Hoskins (AUS)	Kelly Druyts (BEL)
2013 Minsk	Katarzyna Pawłowska (POL)	Sofía Arreola (MEX)	Evgenia Romanyuta (RUS)
2014 Cali	Kelly Druyts (BEL)	Katarzyna Pawłowska (POL)	Evgenia Romanyuta (RUS)
2015 Yvelines	Kirsten Wild (NED)	Amy Cure (AUS)	Allison Beveridge (CAN)
2016 London	Laura Trott (GBR)	Kirsten Wild (NED)	Stephanie Roorda (CAN)
2017 Hong Kong	Rachele Barbieri (ITA)	Elinor Barker (GBR)	Jolien D'Hoore (BEL)
2018 Apeldoorn	Kirsten Wild (NED)	Jolien D'Hoore (BEL)	Amalie Dideriksen (DEN)
2019 Pruszków	Elinor Barker (GBR)	Kirsten Wild (NED)	Jolien D'Hoore (BEL)
2020 Berlin	Kirsten Wild (NED)	Jennifer Valente (USA)	Maria Martins (POR)
2021 Roubaix	Martina Fidanza (ITA)	Maike van der Duin (NED)	Jennifer Valente (USA)
2022 Saint-Quentin-en-Yvelines	Martina Fidanza (ITA)	Maike van der Duin (NED)	Jessica Roberts (GBR)
2023 Glasgow	Jennifer Valente (USA)	Maike van der Duin (NED)	Michaela Drummond (NZL)
2024 Ballerup	Lorena Wiebes (NED)	Jennifer Valente (USA)	Ally Wollaston (NZL)
2025 Santiago	Lorena Wiebes (NED)	Amalie Dideriksen (DEN)	Prudence Fowler (NZL)
2026 Shanghai	Lorena Wiebes (NED)	Lara Gillespie (IRL)	Maria Martins (POR)

== Medal table ==
Rank	Nation	Gold	Silver	Bronze	Total
1	Netherlands	8	5	2	15
2	Cuba	3	2	0	5
3	Italy	3	0	0	3
4	Great Britain	2	2	2	6
5	Poland	2	1	0	3
6	Russia	2	0	5	7
7	United States	1	2	1	4
8	Belgium	1	1	3	5
9	Colombia	1	1	0	2
10	Czechoslovakia	1	0	0	1
10	France	1	0	0	1
12	Australia	0	6	3	9
13	Canada	0	2	2	4
14	Denmark	0	1	1	2
15	Ireland	0	1	0	1
15	Mexico	0	1	0	1
17	New Zealand	0	0	3	3
18	Portugal	0	0	2	2
19	Ukraine	0	0	1	1
Totals (19 entries)		25	25	25	75
