= 2002 UCI Track Cycling World Championships – Women's scratch =

Rainbow jersey

The Women's Scratch was one of the 6 women's events at the 2002 UCI Track Cycling World Championships, held in Copenhagen, Denmark.

19 Cyclists from 19 countries participated in the race. Because of the number of entries, there were no qualification rounds for this discipline. Consequently, the event was run direct to the final.

== Final ==
The Final and only race was run at 15:40 on September 29. The competition consisted on 40 laps, making a total of 10 km.

Rank	Name	Country
	Lada Kozlíková	Czech Republic
	Rochelle Gilmore	Australia
	Olga Slyusareva	Russia
4	Gema Pascual Torrecilla	Spain
5	Lyudmyla Vypyraylo	Ukraine
6	María Luisa Calle	Colombia
7	Mandy Poitras	Canada
8	Giorgia Bronzini	Italy
9	Belem Guerrero Méndez	Mexico
10	Rikke Olsen	Denmark
11	Joanne Marie Kiesanowski	New Zealand
12	Adrie Visser	Netherlands
13	Cathy Moncassin	France
14	Anke Wichmann	Germany
15	Rebecca Quinn	United States
16	Maaria Siren	Finland
17	Evelyn García	El Salvador
18	Eleftheria Ellinikaki	Greece
19	Emma Davies	United Kingdom
