= 2010 UCI Track Cycling World Championships – Women's scratch =

Women's scatch race
2010 UCI Track Cycling World Championships
- Rainbow jersey

Race details
- Dates: 26 March 2010
- Stages: 1
- Distance: 10 km (6.214 mi)

Medalists
	Gold	Pascale Jeuland] (France)
	Silver	Yumari González (Cuba)
	Bronze	Belinda Goss (Australia)

The Women's Scratch was one of the 9 women's events at the 2010 UCI Track Cycling World Championships, held in Ballerup, Denmark on 26 March 2010.

24 Cyclists participated in the contest. The competition consisted of 40 laps, making a total of 10 km.

== Results ==
Rank	Name	Nation	Laps Down
1st place, gold medalist(s)	Pascale Jeuland	France	
2nd place, silver medalist(s)	Yumari González	Cuba	
3rd place, bronze medalist(s)	Belinda Goss	Australia	
4	Kelly Druyts	Belgium	
5	Jarmila Machačová	Czech Republic	
6	Małgorzata Wojtyra	Poland	
7	Na Ah Reum	South Korea	
8	Tatsiana Sharakova	Belarus	
9	Julie Leth	Denmark	
10	Diao Xiao Juan	Hong Kong	
11	Elissavet Chantzi	Greece	
12	Vera Koedooder	Netherlands	
13	Paola Muñoz	Chile	
14	Andrea Wölfer	Switzerland	
15	Rushlee Buchanan	New Zealand	
16	Elke Gebhardt	Germany	
17	Alžbeta Pavlendová	Slovakia	
18	Iryna Shpylyova	Ukraine	
19	Ana Usabiaga Bareldi	Spain	
20	Anna Blyth	Great Britain	
21	Svetlana Pauliukaitė	Lithuania	
22	Giorgia Bronzini	Italy	
DNF	Evgenia Romanyuta	Russia	
DNF	Shelley Evans	United States	
