= European Track Championships – Women's under-23 scratch race =

UEC European Champion jersey

The Women's under-23 scratch race at the European Track Championships was first competed at the 2002 European Track Championships in Büttgen, Germany.

== Medalists ==
Championships	Gold	Silver	Bronze
2002 Büttgen	Mathilde Doutreluingne (FRA)	Lisa Gatto (ITA)	Vera Koedooder (NED)
2003 Moscow	Yulia Aroustamova (RUS)	Sofiya Pryshchepa (UKR)	Giorgia Bronzini (ITA)
2004 Valencia	Eleonora Soldo (ITA)	Yulia Aroustamova (RUS)	Korina Konstantinidou (GRE)
2005 Fiorenzuola	Pascale Schnider (SUI)	Svitlana Semchuk (UKR)	Eleonora Soldo (ITA)
2006 Athens	Monia Baccaille (ITA)	Alena Prudnikova (RUS)	Tatsiana Sharakova (BLR)
2007 Cottbus	Lizzie Armitstead (GBR)	Annalisa Cucinotta (ITA)	Jarmila Machačová (CZE)
2008 Pruszków	Ellen van Dijk (NED); Lizzie Armitstead (GBR)	Not awarded (Note: There were awarded 2 gold medals (and no silver medal) because Ellen van Dijk and Lizzie Armitstead finished at the same time. Even on the finish photo there was not a difference in finishing time)	Evgenia Romanyuta (RUS)
2009 Minsk	Anna Blyth (GBR)	Małgorzata Wojtyra (POL)	Evgenia Romanyuta (RUS)
2010 St. Petersburg	Renata Dąbrowska (POL)	Kelly Druyts (BEL)	Evgenia Romanyuta (RUS)
2011 Anadia	Emma Trott (GBR)	Małgorzata Wojtyra (POL)	Shannon McCurley (IRL)
2012 Anadia	Natalia Rutkowska (POL)	Laurie Berthon (FRA)	Katsiaryna Barazna (BLR)
2013 Anadia	Maria Giulia Confalonieri (ITA)	Laurie Berthon (FRA)	Lucie Záleská (CZE)
