= Cycling at the 2010 South American Games – Women's road race =

The women's road race event at the 2010 South American Games was held at 9:00 on March 22.

== Medalists ==
Gold	Silver	Bronze
Paola Madriñán; Colombia	Rosane Kirch; Brazil	María Luisa Calle; Colombia

== Results ==
Race distance: 73.2 km

Rank	Rider	Time	Time Behind	Speed
1st place, gold medalist(s)	Paola Madriñán (COL)	2:10:57		33.539
2nd place, silver medalist(s)	Rosane Kirch (BRA)	2:14:03	+3:06	
3rd place, bronze medalist(s)	María Luisa Calle (COL)	2:15:09	+4:12	
4	Sérika Gulumá (COL)	2:16:50	+5:53	
5	Marcia Silva (BRA)	2:23:40	+12:43	
6	Leidy Natalia Muñoz Ruiz (COL)	s.t.		
7	Paula Andrea Grandon (CHI)	2:25:53	+14:56	
8	Uênia Souza (BRA)	s.t.		
9	Lorena Vargas (COL)	s.t.		
10	Maria Eugenia Constante (ECU)	s.t.		
11	Myrsa Analia Gaona (PAR)	2:28:56	+17:59	
12	Flor Palma dos Santos (CHI)	2:29:02	+18:05	
13	Barbara Cecilia Iturbe (CHI)	s.t.		
14	Consuelo Gwynne Rodríguez (CHI)	s.t.		
15	Claudia Aravena Cortes (CHI)	s.t.		
16	Valeria Escobar (BOL)	2:35:22	+24:25	
17	Tania Castro (ARG)	2:36:13	+25:26	
	Talia Ayelen Aguirre (ARG)	DNF	LAP	
	Caterine Priviley (ARG)	DNF	LAP	
	Valeria Pintos (ARG)	DNF	LAP	
	Olga Elena Muñoz (CHI)	DNF		
	Janildes Silva (BRA)	DNF		
	Valeria Teresita Müller (ARG)	DNF		
	Daiana Almada (ARG)	DNF		
	Daniela Mishell Carvajal (ECU)	DNS		
