= Sun Feiyan =

Chinese cyclist

Personal information
- Born: 13 May 1989 (age 37)

Cycling career
- Sport: Cycling
- Discipline: Track cycling
- Role: Rider
- Rider type: endurance

Sun Feiyan (born 13 May 1989) is a Chinese female track cyclist, and part of the national team. She competed in the team pursuit and scratch event at the 2009 UCI Track Cycling World Championships in Pruszków, Poland.
