= 2003 UCI Track Cycling World Championships – Women's points race =

The Women's Points Race was one of the 6 women's events at the 2003 UCI Track Cycling World Championships, held in Stuttgart, Germany. Twenty cyclists from 20 countries participated in the race. Because of the number of entries, there were no qualification rounds for this discipline. Consequently, the event was run direct to the final.

== Final ==
The Final and only race was run at 20:30 on July 30. The competition consisted on 84 laps, making a total of 24 km with 12 sprints.

Elapsed Time=32:17.640 Average Speed=44.590 km/h

Rank	Name	Country	Sprint Number												Finish Order	Laps			Total Points
Rank	Name	Country	1	2	3	4	5	6	7	8	9	10	11	12	Finish Order	+	–	Balance	Total Points
	Olga Slyusareva	Russia			1	5		3	1	2	3	5	2	5					27
	Edita Kubelskienė	Lithuania			3		3			5	5		3						19
	Yoanka González Pérez	Cuba	5		2		5					3	1						16
4	Marion Clignet	France						5	5										10
5	Lyudmyla Vypyraylo	Ukraine		5				2						3					8
6	Belem Guerrero Méndez	Mexico						1			1		5	1					8
7	Gema Pascual Torrecilla	Spain	3			3				1		1							8
8	Adrie Visser	Netherlands			5									2					6
9	Anke Wichmann	Germany		2		1	2												5
10	Katherine Bates	Australia				2	1					2							5
11	Erin Mirabella	United States	2								2								4
12	Mandy Poitras	Canada		3															3
13	Evelyn García	El Salvador								3									3
14	Limei Yang	China							3										3
15	Vera Carrara	Italy		1					2										3
16	Ine Wannijn	Belgium																	0
17	Lada Kozlíková	Czech Republic																	0
18	Tatsiana Sharakova	Belarus	1														1	-1	1
19	Katarzyna Jagusiak	Poland															1	-1	0
DNS	Sarah Ulmer	New Zealand																	
