= Mosėdis =

- Town
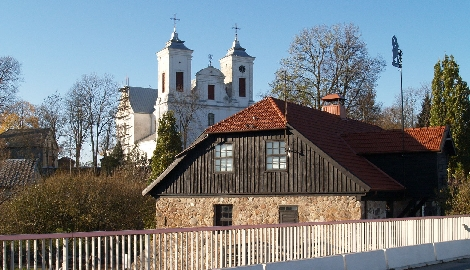
- Rare Stones Museum and church

- Coat of arms
- Nickname: Capital of the stones
- Location of Mosėdis
- Coordinates: 56°10′N 21°35′E
- Country: Lithuania
- County: Klaipėda County
- Municipality: Skuodas District Municipality
- Eldership: Kretingalė eldership
- Capital of: Mosėdis eldership

Population (2021)
  - Total: 916
- Time zone: UTC+2 (EET)
  - Summer (DST): UTC+3 (EEST)

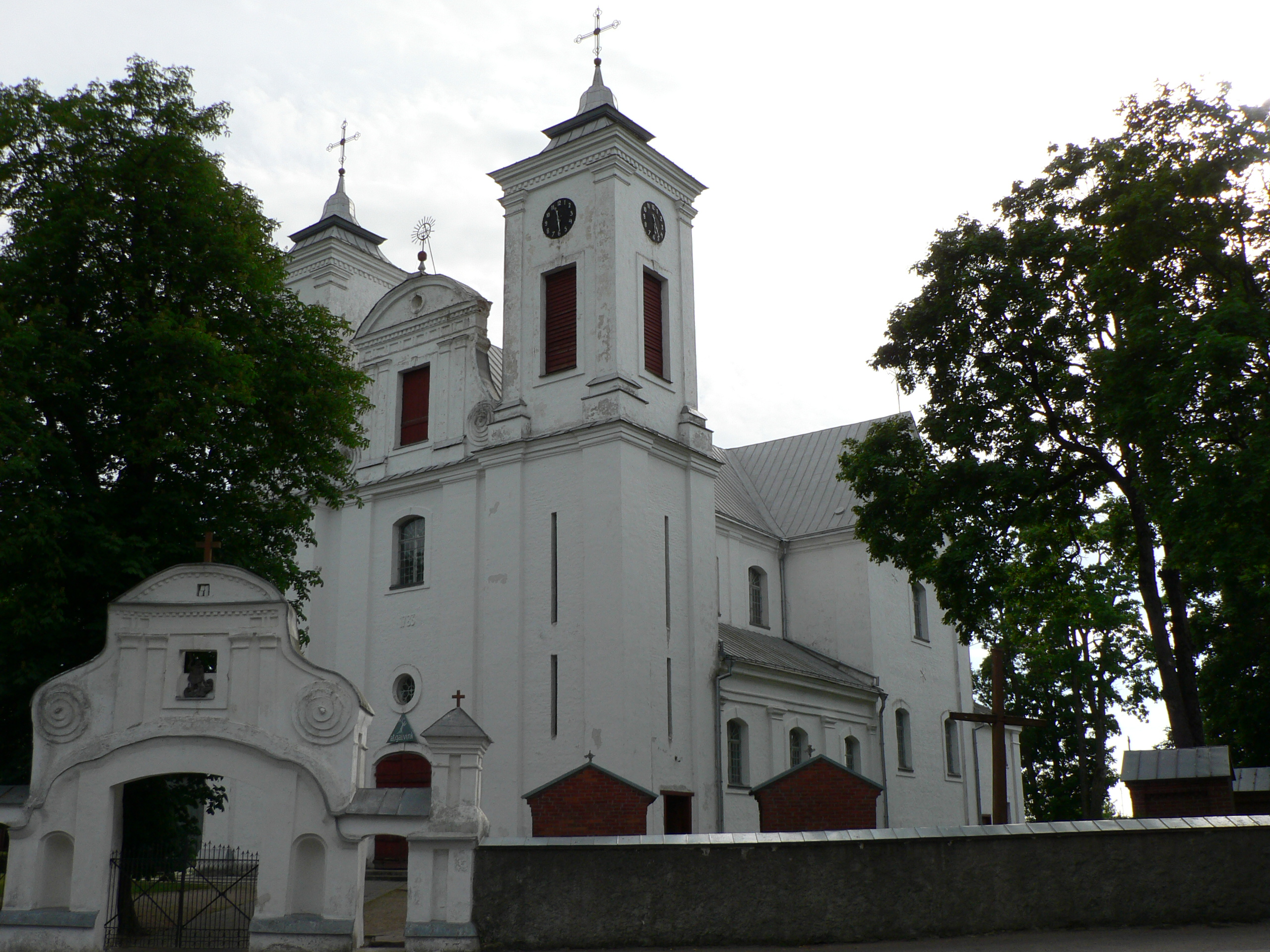
Archangel Michael Church in Mosėdis

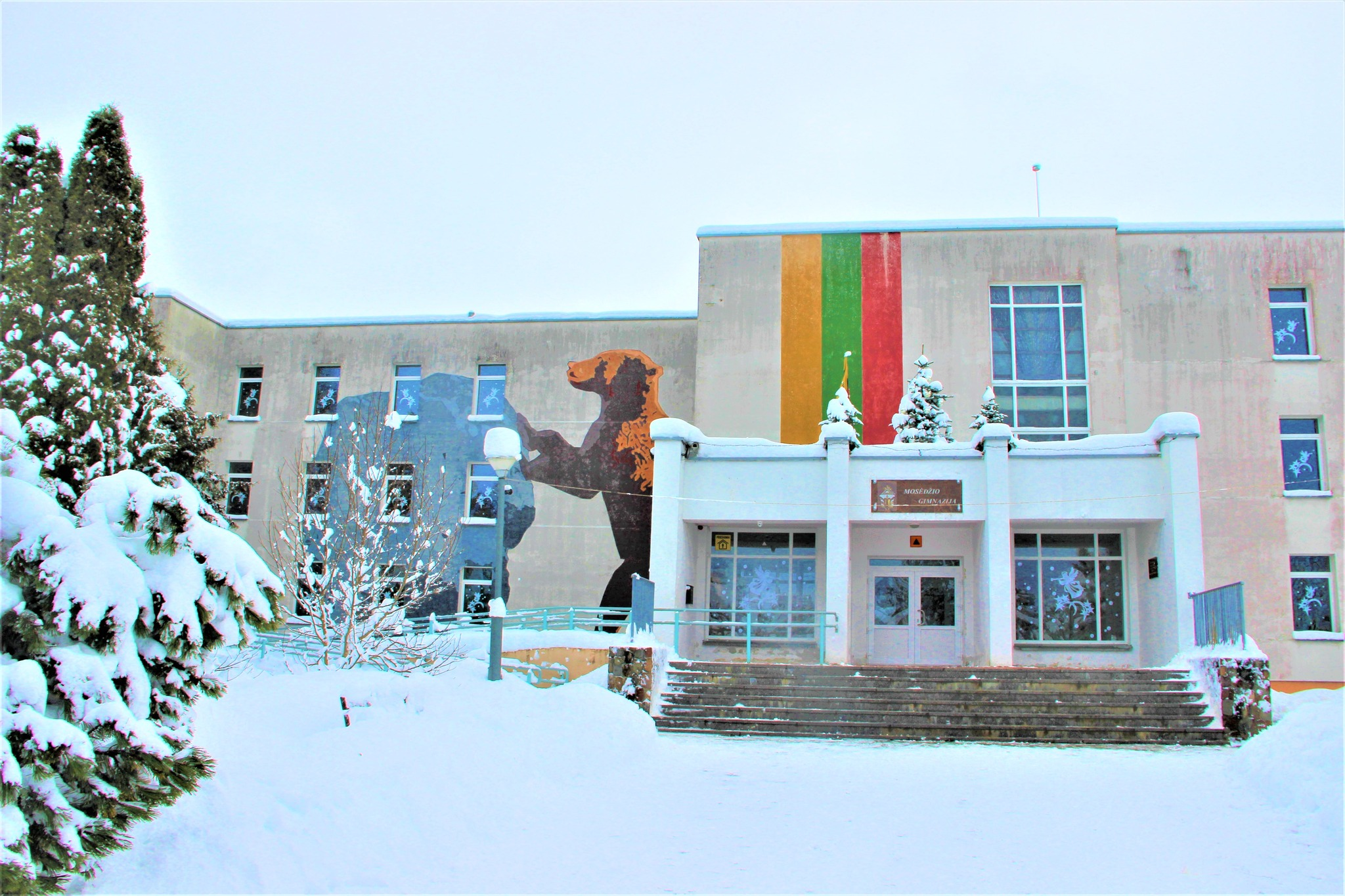
Mosėdis High School

Mosėdis is a small town in Samogitia, northwestern Lithuania in Klaipėda County and Skuodas district. Mosėdis is mostly known for its Rare Stones Museum. The museum and its impressive outdoor collection were started by Vaclovas Intas and have since expanded all over the town. The town also features a Baroque Catholic church built in the 18th century.

== Famous citizens ==
- Svetlana Pauliukaitė, Olympic cyclist.
- Romualdas Granauskas, Popular writer.
- Vaclovas Intas, Doctor, creator of stones museum.

== Geography ==
The Bartuva River runs through the town. The closest large city is Klaipėda; it is approximately 70 km south of Mosėdis. It is approximately 34 km from the Baltic Sea, and roughly 12 km from the Latvian border.
