= Cycling at the 2010 South American Games – Women's road time trial =

The Women's Time Trial event at the 2010 South American Games was held at 10:00 on March 17.

== Medalists ==
Gold	Silver	Bronze
María Luisa Calle; Colombia	Paola Madriñán; Colombia	Valeria Muller; Argentina

== Results ==
Rank	Rider	Time
1st place, gold medalist(s)	María Luisa Calle (COL)	27:44.035
2nd place, silver medalist(s)	Paola Madriñán (COL)	28:22.087
3rd place, bronze medalist(s)	Valeria Muller (ARG)	29:04.774
4	Janildes Fernandes (BRA)	29:47.292
5	Rosane Kirch (BRA)	30:25.692
6	Daniela Mishell Carvajal (ECU)	30:48.860
7	Claudia Cortes (CHI)	30:56.790
8	Flor Palma dos Santos (CHI)	31:17.991
