= Yumari González =

Cuban cyclist (born 1979)

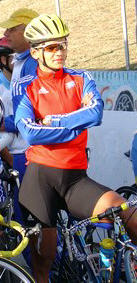
- González at the 2005 Pan American Cycling Championships

Personal information
- Full name: Yumari González Valdivieso
- Born: June 13, 1979 (age 47) Cuba

Cycling career
- Sport: Cycling
- Disciplines: Track; Road
- Role: Rider
Medal record
Representing Cuba
Women's track cycling
World Championships
| Gold medal – first place | 2007 Palma de Mallorca | Scratch |
| Gold medal – first place | 2009 Pruszków | Scratch |
| Silver medal – second place | 2008 Manchester | Scratch |
| Silver medal – second place | 2009 Pruszków | Points race |
| Silver medal – second place | 2010 Ballerup | Scratch |
Pan American Games
| Silver medal – second place | 2011 Guadalajara | Team pursuit |
| Bronze medal – third place | 1999 Winnipeg | 500m time trial |
| Bronze medal – third place | 1999 Winnipeg | Sprint |
| Bronze medal – third place | 2003 Santo Domingo | 500m time trial |
| Bronze medal – third place | 2003 Santo Domingo | Keirin |
Central American and Caribbean Games
| Gold medal – first place | 1998 Maracaibo | 500m time trial |
| Gold medal – first place | 2006 Cartagena | Keirin |
| Gold medal – first place | 2014 Veracruz | Team pursuit |
| Silver medal – second place | 1998 Maracaibo | Sprint |
| Silver medal – second place | 2006 Cartagena | Points race |
| Silver medal – second place | 2006 Cartagena | Scratch |
Pan American Track Championships
| Gold medal – first place | 2002 Quito | 500m time trial |
| Gold medal – first place | 2004 Cojedes | Scratch |
| Gold medal – first place | 2005 Mar del Plata | Scratch |
| Gold medal – first place | 2006 São Paulo | Scratch |
| Gold medal – first place | 2010 Aguascalientes | Scratch |
| Silver medal – second place | 2002 Quito | Keirin |
| Silver medal – second place | 2002 Quito | Sprint |
| Silver medal – second place | 2004 Cojedes | 500m time trial |
| Silver medal – second place | 2004 Cojedes | Keirin |
| Silver medal – second place | 2004 Cojedes | Sprint |
| Silver medal – second place | 2007 Valencia | Team sprint |
| Silver medal – second place | 2010 Aguascalientes | Team pursuit |
| Silver medal – second place | 2014 Aguascalientes | Team pursuit |
| Bronze medal – third place | 2005 Mar del Plata | 500m time trial |
| Bronze medal – third place | 2005 Mar del Plata | Points race |
Women's road bicycle racing
Pan American Games
| Gold medal – first place | 2007 Rio de Janeiro | Road race |
| Silver medal – second place | 2011 Guadalajara | Road race |
Central American and Caribbean Games
| Silver medal – second place | 2006 Cartagena | Road race |
| Silver medal – second place | 2014 Veracruz | Road race |
Pan American Road Championships
| Gold medal – first place | 2006 São Paulo | Road race |
| Gold medal – first place | 2008 Montevideo | Road race |
| Gold medal – first place | 2012 Mar del Plata | Road race |
| Silver medal – second place | 2007 Valencia | Road race |
| Bronze medal – third place | 2005 Mar del Plata | Road race |
| Bronze medal – third place | 2015 León | Road race |

Yumari González Valdivieso (born June 13, 1979) is a Cuban professional road and track cyclist. She competed at the 2008 and 2012 Summer Olympics in the Women's road race.

== Career ==
Born in Sancti Spíritus, González won the 500-metre time trial at the 2002 Pan American Cycling Championships, setting a new Pan American record with a time of 34.647 seconds. She also won silver medals in the sprint and the keirin.

== Major results ==
=== Track ===
1998
Central American and Caribbean Games

1st 500m time trial
2nd Sprint

1999
Pan American Games

3rd 500m time trial
3rd Sprint

2002
UCI Track Cycling World Cup Classics

1st Keirin, Monterrey
3rd 500m time trial, Cali

Pan American Track Championships

1st 500m time trial
2nd Sprint
2nd Keirin

2003
Pan American Games

3rd 500m time trial
3rd Keirin

2004
Pan American Track Championships

1st Scratch
2nd 500m time trial
2nd Keirin
2nd Sprint

2005
Pan American Track Championships

1st Scratch
3rd 500m time trial
3rd Points race

2006
1st Scratch, Pan American Track Championships
Central American and Caribbean Games

1st Keirin
2nd Points race
2nd Scratch

2007
1st Scratch, UCI Track Cycling World Championships
2007–08 UCI Track Cycling World Cup Classics

1st Scratch, Sydney
3rd Scratch, Beijing
3rd Team pursuit, Beijing

2nd Team sprint, Pan American Track Championships
2006–07 UCI Track Cycling World Cup Classics

3rd Team sprint, Los Angeles
3rd Scratch, Manchester

2008
2008–09 UCI Track Cycling World Cup Classics, Cali

1st Team pursuit
2nd Points race
2nd Scratch

2nd Scratch, UCI Track Cycling World Championships
2009
UCI Track Cycling World Championships

1st Scratch
2nd Points race

2009–10 UCI Track Cycling World Cup Classics

2nd Points race, Manchester
3rd Scratch, Cali

2010
Pan American Track Championships

1st Scratch
2nd Team pursuit

2nd Scratch, UCI Track Cycling World Championships
2011
2nd Team pursuit, Pan American Games
2013
Copa Cuba de Pista

1st Team pursuit (with Yudelmis Domínguez, Marlies Mejías and Arlenis Sierra)
3rd Points race

2014
1st Team pursuit, Central American and Caribbean Games (with Yudelmis Domínguez, Marlies Mejías and Arlenis Sierra)
2nd Team pursuit, Pan American Track Championships (with Yudelmis Domínguez, Yoanka González and Marlies Mejías)
Copa Cuba de Pista

2nd Omnium
2nd Scratch

=== Road ===
2005
3rd Road race, Pan American Road Championships
3rd Time trial, National Road Championships
2006
1st Road race, Pan American Road Championships
2nd Road race, Central American and Caribbean Games
2007
1st Road race, Pan American Games
2nd Road race, Pan American Road Championships
2008
1st Road race, Pan American Road Championships
National Road Championships

1st Road race
2nd Time trial

2011
2nd Road race, Pan American Games
2012
1st Road race, Pan American Road Championships
1st Road race, National Road Championships
2014
2nd Road race, Central American and Caribbean Games
3rd Road race, National Road Championships
2015
3rd Road race, Pan American Road Championships
3rd Time trial, National Road Championships
8th Road race, Pan American Games
2016
1st Time trial, National Road Championships
2019
9th Road race, Pan American Games

Sporting positions
| Preceded by María Luisa Calle (COL) | Track Cycling World Champion (scratch race); 2007 | Succeeded by Ellen van Dijk (NED) |
| Preceded by Ellen van Dijk (NED) | Track Cycling World Champion (scratch race); 2009 | Succeeded by Pascale Jeuland (FRA) |
