= 2008 UCI Track Cycling World Championships – Women's 500 m time trial =

Rainbow jersey

The Women's 500 m time trial was one of the 8 women's events at the 2008 UCI Track Cycling World Championships, held in Manchester, United Kingdom.

16 cyclists from 12 countries participated in the contest. The final was held on March 26.

== World record ==
World Record
| WR | 33.588 | Anna Meares (AUS) | Palma de Mallorca (Spain) | March 31, 2007 |

== Final ==
| Rank | Name | 250m | Time | Speed (km/h) |
| Rank | Name | 250m | 250-500 | Speed (km/h) |
|---|---|---|---|---|
| | Lisandra Guerra (CUB) | 18.954 (1) | 34.021 | 52.908 |
| | Lisandra Guerra (CUB) | | 15.067 (5) | 52.908 |
| | Simona Krupeckaitė (LTU) | 19.361 (5) | 34.066 | 52.838 |
| | Simona Krupeckaitė (LTU) | | 14.705 (1) | 52.838 |
| | Sandie Clair (FRA) | 19.328 (4) | 34.253 | 52.550 |
| | Sandie Clair (FRA) | | 14.925 (3) | 52.550 |
| 4 | Willy Kanis (NED) | 19.375 (6) | 34.254 | 52.548 |
| 4 | Willy Kanis (NED) | | 14.879 (2) | 52.548 |
| 5 | Gong Jinjie (CHN) | 19.187 (2) | 34.449 | 52.251 |
| 5 | Gong Jinjie (CHN) | | 15.262 (10) | 52.251 |
| 6 | Miriam Welte (GER) | 19.462 (8) | 34.666 | 51.924 |
| 6 | Miriam Welte (GER) | | 15.204 (8) | 51.924 |
| 7 | Shanaze Reade (GBR) | 19.198 (3) | 34.702 | 51.870 |
| 7 | Shanaze Reade (GBR) | | 15.504 (15) | 51.870 |
| 8 | Natallia Tsylinskaya (BLR) | 19.600 (10) | 34.725 | 51.835 |
| 8 | Natallia Tsylinskaya (BLR) | | 15.125 (7) | 51.835 |
| 9 | Anna Blyth (GBR) | 19.457 (7) | 34.792 | 51.736 |
| 9 | Anna Blyth (GBR) | | 15.335 (11) | 51.736 |
| 10 | Yvonne Hijgenaar (NED) | 19.793 (12) | 34.896 | 51.581 |
| 10 | Yvonne Hijgenaar (NED) | | 15.103 (6) | 51.581 |
| 11 | Zheng Lulu (CHN) | 19.782 (11) | 34.992 | 51.440 |
| 11 | Zheng Lulu (CHN) | | 15.210 (9) | 51.440 |
| 12 | Kaarle McCulloch (AUS) | 19.529 (9) | 35.026 | 51.390 |
| 12 | Kaarle McCulloch (AUS) | | 15.497 (14) | 51.390 |
| 13 | Lyubov Shulika (UKR) | 20.226 (15) | 35.267 | 51.039 |
| 13 | Lyubov Shulika (UKR) | | 15.041 (4) | 51.039 |
| 14 | Diana García (COL) | 20.093 (13) | 35.505 | 50.697 |
| 14 | Diana García (COL) | | 15.412 (13) | 50.697 |
| 15 | Virginie Cueff (FRA) | 20.132 (14) | 35.520 | 50.675 |
| 15 | Virginie Cueff (FRA) | | 15.388 (12) | 50.675 |
| 16 | Jutatip Maneephan (THA) | 21.165 (16) | 37.545 | 47.942 |
| 16 | Jutatip Maneephan (THA) | | 16.380 (16) | 47.942 |
