= 2007 UCI Track Cycling World Championships – Women's scratch =

Women's scratch at the 2007 UCI Track Cycling World Championships
- Venue: Palma Arena
- Location: Palma de Mallorca, Spain
- Date: 31 March 2007

Medalists
gold medal	Yumari González Valdivieso	Cuba
silver medal	María Luisa Calle	Colombia
bronze medal	Adrie Visser	Netherlands

The Women's Scratch is one of the 7 women's events at the 2007 UCI Track World Championship, held in Palma de Mallorca, Spain.

20 Cyclists from 20 countries participated in the contest. Because of the number of entries, there were no qualification rounds for this discipline. Consequently, the event was run direct to the final.

== Final ==
The Final and only race was run at 19:45 on March 31. The competition consisted on 40 laps, making a total of 10 km. Yumari González attacked off the front of the bunch within the final two laps of the race, securing her gold medal, Calle followed to claim the silver leaving the rest to fight for bronze in a bunch sprint. Rebecca Quinn sprinted between two riders to claim third position but was later relegated when the judges decided she had made contact with another rider in doing so.

Rank	Name	Country
	Yumari González Valdivieso	Cuba
	María Luisa Calle	Colombia
	Adrie Visser	Netherlands
4	Lada Kozlíková	Czech Republic
5	Leire Olaberria Dorronsoro	Spain
6	Annalisa Cucinotta	Italy
7	Olga Slyusareva	Russia
8	Katie Curtis	Great Britain
9	Lesya Kalytovska	Ukraine
10	Pascale Schnider	Switzerland
11	Iona Wynter	Jamaica
12	Belinda Goss	Australia
13	Wang Jianling	China
14	Eleftheria-Maria Ellinikaki	Greece
15	Catherine Cheatley	New Zealand
16	Madeleine Sandig	Germany
17	Belem Guerrero Méndez	Mexico
18	Cathy Moncassin Prime	France
19	Magdalena Sara	Poland
REL	Rebecca Quinn	United States
