= Thatsani Wichana =

Thai cyclist

Personal information
- Born: 30 December 1988 (age 37) Nakhon Si Thammarat, Thailand

Cycling career
- Sport: Cycling
- Disciplines: Road cycling, Track cycling

Thatsani Wichana (born 30 December 1988) is a track and road cyclist from Thailand. She represented her nation at the 2007 and 2009 UCI Road World Championships. She competed in the scratch event at the 2009 UCI Track Cycling World Championships.
