= 2010 UCI Track Cycling World Championships =

Cycling world championships

- Venue: Ballerup, Denmark
- Date: 24–28 March 2010
- Velodrome: Ballerup Super Arena
- Nations participating: 38
- Cyclists participating: 333
- Events: 19

The 2010 UCI Track Cycling World Championships were the World Championships for track cycling in 2010. They took place at the Ballerup Super Arena in Ballerup, Denmark from 24 to 28 March 2010.

== Participating nations ==
38 nations participated

- Argentina (3)
- Australia (20)
- Austria (5)
- Azerbaijan (1)
- Belgium (7)
- Belarus (2)
- Canada (9)
- Chile (2)
- China (16)
- Colombia (1)
- Cuba (3)
- Czech Republic (9)
- Denmark (13)
- Spain (14)
- France (21)
- Great Britain (19)
- Germany (22)
- Greece (13)
- Hong Kong (8)
- Indonesia (1)
- Ireland (5)
- Italy (15)
- Japan (5)
- Kazakhstan (1)
- South Korea (1)
- Lithuania (7)
- Malaysia (2)
- Mexico (3)
- Netherlands (15)
- New Zealand (17)
- Poland (14)
- South Africa (1)
- Russia (21)
- Switzerland (9)
- Slovakia (1)
- Thailand (3)
- Ukraine (16)
- United States (8)

== Medal summary ==
Event	Gold		Silver		Bronze	
Men's events
Men's sprint	Grégory Baugé; France		Shane Perkins; Australia		Kévin Sireau; France	
Men's 1 km time trial	Teun Mulder; Netherlands	1:00.341	Michaël D'Almeida; France	1:00.884	François Pervis; France	1:01.024
Men's individual pursuit	Taylor Phinney; United States	4:16.600	Jesse Sergent; New Zealand	4:18.459	Jack Bobridge; Australia	4:18.066
Men's team pursuit	Jack Bobridge; Rohan Dennis; Michael Hepburn; Cameron Meyer; Leigh Howard (qualifying round only); Australia	3:55.654	Steven Burke; Ed Clancy; Ben Swift; Andy Tennant; Great Britain	3:55.806	Sam Bewley; Westley Gough; Peter Latham; Jesse Sergent; New Zealand	3:58.616
Men's team sprint	Robert Förstemann; Maximilian Levy; Stefan Nimke; Germany	43.433	Grégory Baugé; Michaël D'Almeida; Kévin Sireau; France	43.453	Ross Edgar; Chris Hoy; Jason Kenny; Great Britain	43.590
Men's keirin	Chris Hoy; Great Britain		Azizulhasni Awang; Malaysia		Maximilian Levy; Germany	
Men's scratch	Alex Rasmussen; Denmark		Juan Esteban Arango; Colombia		Kazuhiro Mori; Japan	
Men's points race	Cameron Meyer; Australia	70	Peter Schep; Netherlands	33	Milan Kadlec; Czech Republic	27
Men's madison	Leigh Howard; Cameron Meyer; Australia	16	Morgan Kneisky; Christophe Riblon; France	6	Ingmar De Poortere; Steve Schets; Belgium	5
Men's omnium	Ed Clancy; Great Britain	24	Leigh Howard; Australia	32	Taylor Phinney; United States	33
Women's events
Women's sprint	Victoria Pendleton; Great Britain		Guo Shuang; China		Simona Krupeckaitė; Lithuania	
Women's 500 m time trial	Anna Meares; Australia	33.381	Simona Krupeckaitė; Lithuania	33.462	Olga Panarina; Belarus	33.779
Women's individual pursuit	Sarah Hammer; United States	3:28.601	Wendy Houvenaghel; Great Britain	3:32.496	Vilija Sereikaitė; Lithuania	3:32.085
Women's team pursuit	Ashlee Ankudinoff; Sarah Kent; Josephine Tomic; Australia	3:21.748	Elizabeth Armitstead; Wendy Houvenaghel; Joanna Rowsell; Great Britain	3:22.287	Rushlee Buchanan; Lauren Ellis; Alison Shanks; New Zealand	3:21.552 WR
Women's team sprint	Kaarle McCulloch; Anna Meares; Australia	32.923 WR	Gong Jinjie; Lin Junhong; China	33.192	Gintarė Gaivenytė; Simona Krupeckaitė; Lithuania	33.109
Women's keirin	Simona Krupeckaitė; Lithuania		Victoria Pendleton; Great Britain		Olga Panarina; Belarus	
Women's scratch	Pascale Jeuland; France		Yumari González; Cuba		Belinda Goss; Australia	
Women's points race	Tara Whitten; Canada	36	Lauren Ellis; New Zealand	33	Tatsiana Sharakova; Belarus	33
Women's omnium	Tara Whitten; Canada	23	Lizzie Armitstead; Great Britain	29	Leire Olaberria; Spain	30

== Medal table ==
Rank	Nation	Gold	Silver	Bronze	Total
1	Australia (AUS)	6	2	2	10
2	Great Britain (GBR)	3	5	1	9
3	France (FRA)	2	3	2	7
4	United States (USA)	2	0	1	3
5	Canada (CAN)	2	0	0	2
6	Lithuania (LTU)	1	1	3	5
7	Netherlands (NED)	1	1	0	2
8	Germany (GER)	1	0	1	2
9	Denmark (DEN)	1	0	0	1
10	New Zealand (NZL)	0	2	2	4
11	China (CHN)	0	2	0	2
12	Colombia (COL)	0	1	0	1
12	Cuba (CUB)	0	1	0	1
12	Malaysia (MAS)	0	1	0	1
15	Belarus (BLR)	0	0	3	3
16	Belgium (BEL)	0	0	1	1
16	Czech Republic (CZE)	0	0	1	1
16	Japan (JPN)	0	0	1	1
16	Spain (ESP)	0	0	1	1
Totals (19 entries)		19	19	19	57

== See also ==
- 2009–10 UCI Track Cycling World Ranking
- 2009–10 UCI Track Cycling World Cup Classics
