= Eleonora Soldo =

Italian cyclist

Personal information
- Born: 17 January 1984 (age 42) Italy

Cycling career
- Sport: Cycling
- Role: Rider (road and track)

Professional teams
- 2006: USC Chirio Forno d'Asolo
- 2007: A.S. Team FRW
- 2008: Titanedi-Frezza Acca Due O
- 2009: S.C. Michela Fanini-Record Mix

Eleonora Soldo (born 17 January 1984) is an Italian road and track racing cyclist.

Soldo won several medals at the Under-23 European Track Cycling Championships in 2003, 2004, and 2005, including a gold medal in the scratch race in 2004.
