= Gina Grain =

Canadian cyclist (born 1974)

Personal information
- Born: July 16, 1974 (age 52) Lachine, Quebec, Canada
- Height: 1.62 m (5 ft 4 in)
- Weight: 54 kg (119 lb)

Cycling career
- Sport: Cycling
- Current team: Retired
- Disciplines: Road, track
- Role: Rider
- Rider type: All-around

Professional teams
- 1999: Physical Culture
- 2001: 800.com
- 2002: Atlanta Velo
- 2003–2004: Victory Brewing
- 2006: Giant Pro Cycling
- 2007: Team Express Copy
- 2008–2010: Webcor Builders Cycling Team

Major wins
- Canadian Championships (Road) (2007)
Medal record
Representing Canada
Women's track cycling
World Championships
Silver medal – second place	2006 Bordeaux	Scratch
Women's road bicycle racing
Pan American Championships
Bronze medal – third place	2007 Valencia	Road race

Gina Grain (born June 16, 1974, in Lachine, Quebec) is a Canadian retired professional road and track cyclist. She won a silver medal in women' scratch at the 2006 UCI Track Cycling World Championships in Bordeaux, France, and later represented Canada at the 2008 Summer Olympics. Before retiring to focus on her personal life and kinesiology career in 2010, she raced with a number of Canadian, American and Hong Kong road teams.

== Racing career ==
Grain started her professional road cycling career as part of her mountain bike fitness training program with the British Columbia Provincial Team. She rapidly began excel at it and later received an invitation to join the 800.com pro cycling teams in 2001, following her short stints on Atlanta Velo and Victory Brewing for the next two seasons. Grain flourished her first career success at the Grand Montreal Cycling Tour (French: Tour du Grand Montréal), where she officially earned a first stage triumph.

In 2004, Grain emerged as one of the world's top road sprinters, and mounted consistent podium finishes and a limited number of triumphs to earn the U.S. Pro Tour Championships titles and other cycling tournaments. On that same year, she turned her sights to and took up seriously in track cycling. When the Victory Brewing folded out after the 2004 season, Grain left herself with no contract and instead, set up her short retirement to concentrate on her full-time job as a registered kinesiologist in exercise therapy and rehab programs at Saanich Commonwealth Place.

At the start of the 2006 season, Grain returned to her professional cycling career when she signed an exclusive contract with Hong Kong's Giant Pro Cycling. She capped a successful season by taking home the silver medal in the women's elite 8 km scratch race at the UCI World Championships in Bordeaux, France, and mounted top-four finishes in both road and points race at the Commonwealth Games in Melbourne, moving her up to top ten places in the UCI world rankings. Reaching the peak of her sporting career, Grain burst again into the road cycling scene by defending her Tour de Gastown title on that same year, the first being done in 2005.

In 2007, Grain granted license by the Union Cycliste Internationale (UCI) for the Canadian women's pro cycling team, racing under the Expresscopy.com banner. She rounded out another successful season by capturing her first ever and only women's elite road race title at the Canadian Championships in Saint-Georges, Quebec. By the end of 2007 season, Grain joined her teammates Erinne Willock, Alex Wrubleski, and 2004 U.S. Olympian Christine Thorburn as part of the official roster for the Webcor Builders Cycling Team. In July 2008, Grain thrilled again to a sprint finish by claiming her third title at the Tour de Gastown in Vancouver, British Columbia.

Grain qualified for her first Canadian squad, as a 34-year-old, in the women's points race at the 2008 Summer Olympics in Beijing by receiving an invitational berth from the Canadian Cycling Association, based on her top-ten performance in the UCI Track World Rankings. Grain escaped from an early crash (which she fondly called it a "high-speed chess match") that eliminated three other riders off the track to take the ninth spot successfully in a grueling 25-km race, earning a total score of six points in three of the ten sprints. Shortly after the Olympics, Grain was stunned in a major upset from her inexperienced rival Tara Whitten by taking home the silver in the women's points race at the Canadian Track Cycling Championships in Burnaby, British Columbia.

Upon returning to Webcor Builders Cycling Team for another season in 2009, Grain started her stint by edging out New Zealand rider and 2008 Olympian Catherine Cheatley on a blazing sprint road race to score a second stage triumph at the Tour of the Gila in southwestern United States.

== Career highlights ==
2002
2nd Stage 2, Tour de Toona, United States
3rd Stage 5, Tour de Toona, United States
2003
1st Stage 1, Tour du Grand Montréal, Montréal, Québec (CAN)
2nd Manhattan Beach Grand Prix, United States
2nd Stage 2, Tour de Toona, United States
2004
1st CSC Invitational, United States
2nd Liberty Classic, Philadelphia (USA)
3rd Stage 4, Pomona Valley Stage Race, Pomona Valley, California (USA)
3rd Stage 4, Redlands Bicycle Classic, United States
2005
(bronze) Pan American Championships (Scratch), Mar del Plata (ARG)
3rd Stage 1, McLane Pacific Classic, United States
3rd Stage 2, Tour de Toona, Johnstown, Pennsylvania (USA)
3rd Stage 5, Tour de Toona, Martinsburg, Pennsylvania (USA)
2006
1st Tour de Gastown, Canada
(silver) UCI World Championships (Scratch), Bordeaux (FRA)
3rd CSC Invitational, United States
3rd Criterium, Bank of America Invitational, United States
3rd Stage 2, Joe Martin Stage Race, United States
3rd Stage 2, Tour de Toona, Johnstown, Pennsylvania (USA)
4th Commonwealth Games (Road), Melbourne (AUS)
4th Commonwealth Games (Scratch), Melbourne (AUS)
13th UCI World Championships (Points race), Bordeaux (FRA)
2007
1st Canadian Championships (Road), Saint-Georges, Quebec (CAN)
2nd Criterium, Bank of America Invitational, United States
2nd Stage 7, Tour de Toona, United States
(bronze) Pan American Championships (Road), Valencia (VEN)
3rd Liberty Classic, Philadelphia (USA)
3rd Stage 3, Tour of the Gila, United States
9th UCI World Championships (Points race), Palma de Mallorca (ESP)
2008
1st Tour de Gastown, Vancouver, British Columbia (CAN)
2nd Canadian Track Cycling Championships, Burnaby, British Columbia (CAN)
2nd Stage 2, Cascade Cycling Classic, United States
2nd Stage 4, Cascade Cycling Classic, United States
3rd Stage 6, Cascade Cycling Classic, United States
9th Olympic Games (Points race), Beijing (CHN)
13th UCI World Championships (Points race), Manchester (GBR)
2009
1st Stage 2, Tour of the Gila, United States
2nd Canadian Championships (Road), Saint-Georges, Quebec (CAN)
2nd San Jose Cycling Classic, San Jose, California (USA)
2nd Stage 4, Tour of the Gila, Silver City, New Mexico (USA)
3rd Wellington Women's Race, Wellington (NZL)
3rd Stage 2, Nature Valley Grand Prix, Saint Paul, Minnesota (USA)
3rd Stage 3, Joe Martin Stage Race, United States
