= Katsiaryna Barazna =

Belarusian cyclist

Personal information
- Born: 27 April 1990 (age 36)

Cycling career
- Sport: Cycling
- Discipline: Track cycling
- Role: Rider
- Rider type: scratch omnium

Katsiaryna Barazna (born 27 April 1990) is a Belarusian female track cyclist. She competed in the omnium and scratch events at the 2014 UCI Track Cycling World Championships.

== Career results ==
2012
3rd Scratch Race, UEC European U23 Track Championships
