= Andrea Wölfer =

Swiss cyclist

Andrea Wolfer
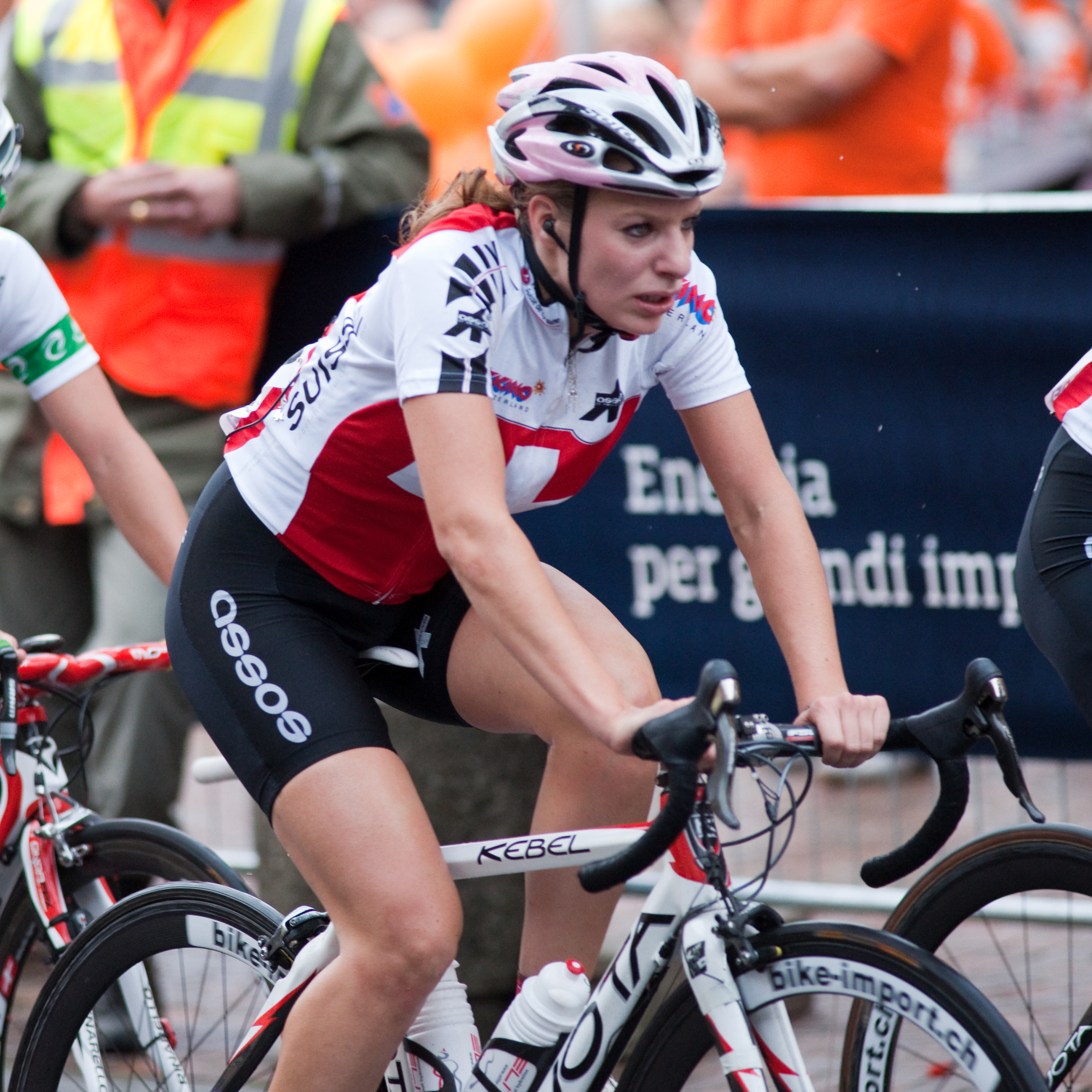
- Wolfer at the 2009 UCI Road World Championships

Personal information
- Born: 16 December 1987 (age 38) Switzerland

Cycling career
- Sport: Cycling
- Disciplines: Road cycling, Track cycling

Professional team
- 2008: Bigla Cycling Team

Andrea Wolfer (born 16 December 1987) is a track and road cyclist from Switzerland. She represented her nation at the 2009 UCI Road World Championships and 2009 UCI Track Cycling World Championships. Wolfer competed in the points race and scratch event at the 2010 UCI Track Cycling World Championships.

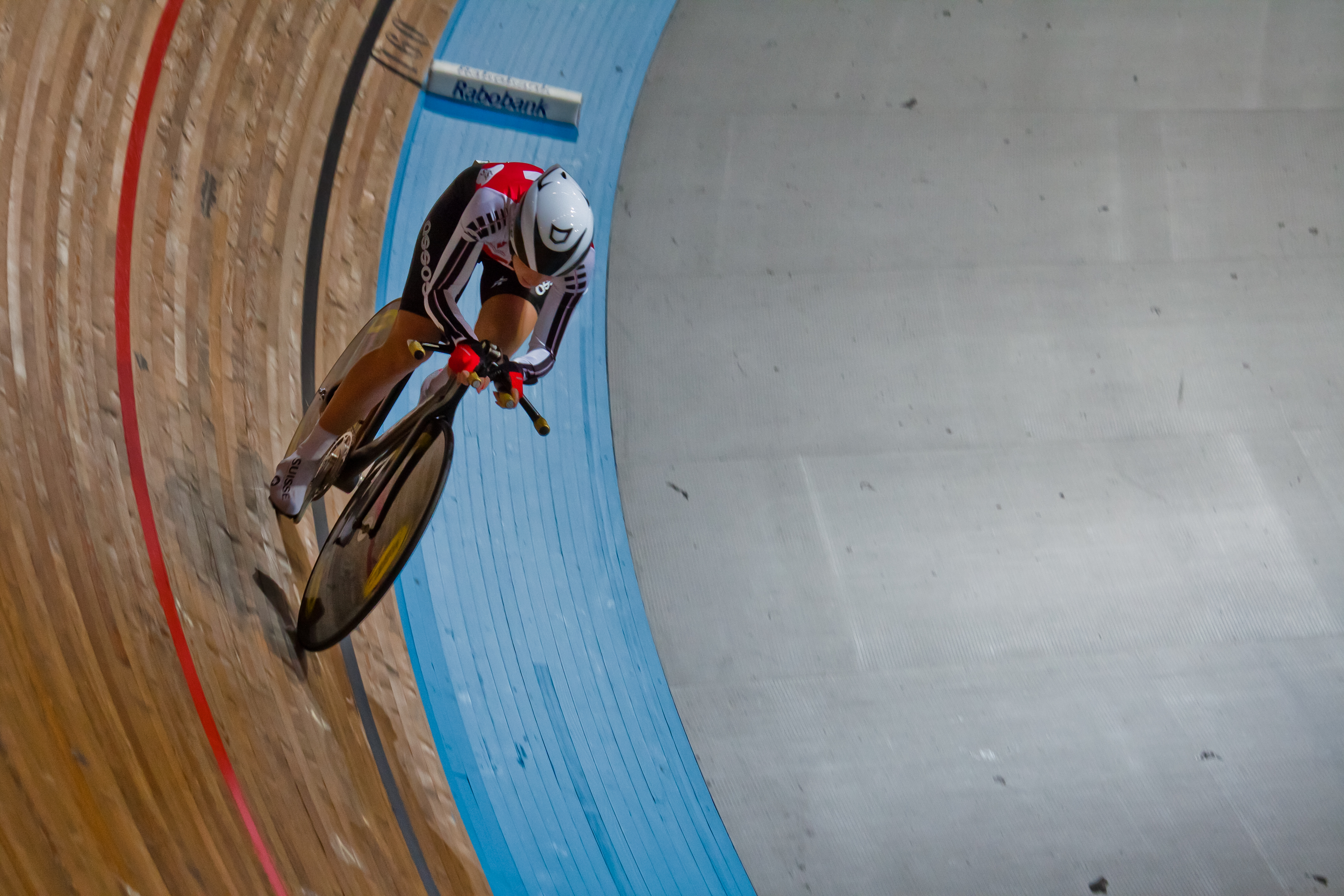
Wolfer at the 2011 European Track Championships

== Major results ==
2008
Grand Prix International Ville de Barcelone

1st Scratch Race
3rd Keirin
3rd 500m Time Trial
