= Belinda Goss =

Australian cyclist (born 1984)

Personal information
- Full name: Belinda Goss
- Born: 6 January 1984 (age 42) Devonport, Tasmania, Australia

Cycling career
- Sport: Cycling
- Discipline: Track
- Role: Rider
Medal record
Representing Australia
World Championships
Bronze medal – third place	2008 Manchester	Scratch
Bronze medal – third place	2009 Pruszków	Scratch
Bronze medal – third place	2010 Ballerup	Scratch

Belinda Goss (born 6 January 1984 in Devonport, Tasmania) is a retired Australian professional racing cyclist. She was an Australian Institute of Sport scholarship holder.

An Australian Institute of Sport Scholarship and Tasmanian Institute of Sport Scholarship holder throughout her career, Goss began racing at just 13 years of age and competed at International Level throughout her career, both on the Track and the Road. A winner of 15 Australian National Titles during her career, Goss represented her country at Junior and Senior level on both the Track and Road at World Championship and Commonwealth Games level. She is the only Australian to have won three consecutive World Championship Track medals in the scratch race. She was inducted into the Tasmanian Institute of Sport Champions Club in 2013 in recognition of her career and contribution to her sport in her state.

Late in 2012, Goss made the decision to step down from international competition as a result of a serious back injury sustained whilst racing in Europe. Following retirement, Belinda has continued her involvement in cycling by transferring her skills into coaching. Belinda is a Level 2 Cycling Australia Qualified Coach.

== Palmarès ==
2002
3rd World Championship, Track, Scratch, Juniors
2003
1st Stage 4, Geelong Tour – Botanic Gardens
2004
1st Points race, Oceania Games, Elite, Melbourne
1st Scratch, Oceania Games, Elite, Melbourne
3rd Keirin, Oceania Games, Elite, Melbourne
2005
3rd Scratch, Australian National Track Championships, Adelaide – U23
2nd Points race, Australian National Track Championships, Adelaide – Elite
3rd Moscow, World Cup, Scratch
2006
3rd Bay Classic
3rd Scratch, Australian National Track Championships, Adelaide – U23
2007
2nd Bay Classic

1st Stage 2, Bay Classic, Portarlington

1st Points race, Australian National Track Championships, Sydney
2nd Manchester, World Cup, Points race
2nd Manchester, World Cup, Scratch
3rd 2007 Tour of Chongming Island Stage race

1st Stage 2, Chongxi
1st Stage 3, Chongbei

2nd Sydney, World Cup, Team Pursuit
2nd Beijing, World Cup, Scratch
2008
1st Points Race, Latrobe Carnival
2nd Bay Classic
3rd Scratch, 2008 UCI Track Cycling World Championships
2009
3rd Scratch, 2009 UCI Track Cycling World Championships
1st Scratch Race, 2009–2010 UCI Track Cycling World Cup Classics
3rd Team Pursuit, 2009–2010 UCI Track Cycling World Cup, Manchester
