= Yoanka González =

Cuban cyclist (born 1976)

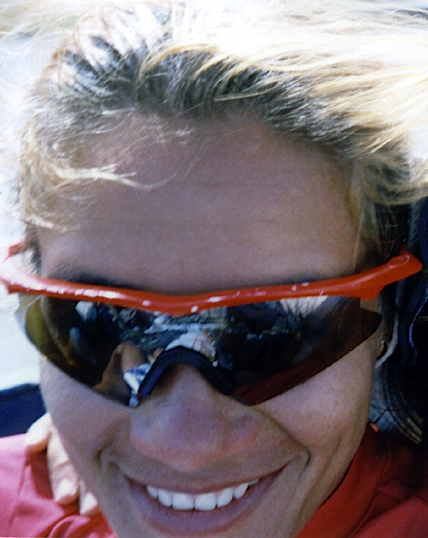

Personal information
- Full name: Yoanka González Pérez
- Born: January 9, 1976 (age 50) Villa Clara, Cuba

Cycling career
- Sport: Cycling
- Discipline: Track
- Role: Rider
- Rider type: Endurance
Medal record
Representing Cuba
Women's track cycling
Olympic Games
Silver medal – second place	2008 Beijing	Points race
World Championships
Gold medal – first place	2004 Melbourne	Scratch
Bronze medal – third place	2003 Stuttgart	Points race
Pan American Games
Gold medal – first place	2007 Rio de Janeiro	Points race
Silver medal – second place	1995 Mar del Plata	Individual pursuit
Silver medal – second place	2003 Santo Domingo	Individual pursuit
Bronze medal – third place	1999 Winnipeg	Individual pursuit
Bronze medal – third place	2003 Santo Domingo	Points race
Pan American Championships
Gold medal – first place	2004 Cojedes	Individual pursuit
Gold medal – first place	2006 São Paulo	Points race
Gold medal – first place	2008 Montevideo	Points race
Gold medal – first place	2008 Montevideo	Scratch
Gold medal – first place	2011 Medellin	Team pursuit
Gold medal – first place	2011 Medellin	Scratch
Silver medal – second place	2006 São Paulo	Individual pursuit
Silver medal – second place	2006 São Paulo	Scratch
Silver medal – second place	2014 Aguascalientes	Team pursuit
Bronze medal – third place	2007 Valencia	Points race
Central American and Caribbean Games
Gold medal – first place	2006 Cartagena	Points race
Gold medal – first place	2006 Cartagena	Road race
Silver medal – second place	1998 Maracaibo	Road race
Silver medal – second place	2006 Cartagena	Individual pursuit
Bronze medal – third place	1998 Maracaibo	Individual pursuit
Women's road cycling
Pan American Games
Gold medal – first place	2003 Santo Domingo	Road race
Silver medal – second place	1999 Winnipeg	Road race
Pan American Championships
Gold medal – first place	2004 Cojedes	Road race
Bronze medal – third place	1997	Road race
Bronze medal – third place	2000 Bucaramanga	Road race
Bronze medal – third place	2004 Cojedes	Time trial

Yoanka González Pérez (born 9 January 1976 in Villa Clara) is a Cuban racing cyclist, competing in both road cycling and track cycling. She was the 2004 scratch cycling world champion. She is also married to cyclist Pedro Pablo Pérez.

== Major results ==
1995
2nd Pursuit, Pan American Games (Mar del Plata, Argentina)
1999
1st Road Race, National Championship, Cuba
2nd Road Race, Pan American Games (Winnipeg, Canada)
2nd Road Race, B World Championship (Montevideo, Uruguay)
2001
1st Road Race, National Championship, Cuba
1st Individual Time Trial, National Championship, Cuba
2003
1st Road Race, 2003 Pan American Games (Santo Domingo, Dominican Republic)
2004
3rd Points race, Moscow, Russia
3rd Individual Time Trial, Pan American Championships
2005
2nd Points race, Moscow, Russia
1st Scratch Race, Moscow, Russia
2006
2nd Road Race, National Championship, Cuba
1st Road Race, Central American and Caribbean Sports Games (Cartagena, Colombia)
2nd Points race, Moscow, Russia
3rd Scratch Race, Moscow, Russia
2007
2nd Points race, Los Angeles, United States of America
1st Points race, Manchester, Great Britain
3rd Track Points race, Pan American Championships
2nd Points race, Beijing, China
3rd Team Pursuit, Beijing, China
2008
2nd Points race, Summer Olympics (Beijing)
2014
2nd Team Pursuit, Pan American Track Championships (with Yudelmis Dominguez Masague, Yumari Gonzalez Valdivieso and Marlies Mejias Garcia)
Copa Cuba de Pista (Havana, Cuba)

2nd Points Race
3rd Omnium

1st Individual Time Trial National Championship, Cuba
