= Rebecca Quinn (cyclist) =

American cyclist (born 1971)

Personal information
- Full name: Rebecca Quinn
- Nickname: Quinny
- Born: May 24, 1971 (age 55) Quakertown, Pennsylvania United States
- Height: 5 ft 1 in (1.55 m)
- Weight: 122 lb (55 kg)

Cycling career
- Sport: Cycling
- Current team: South Bay Wheelmen
- Discipline: Track
- Role: Rider
- Rider type: Track Endurance

Amateur team
- 1994-2002: -

Professional team
- 2002-2009: Spike, South Bay Wheelmen

Major wins
- Three National Championships, Five National Collegiate Championships, Five World Cup medals, Two fourth-place finishes at World Championships, Holder of UCI Points Leader Jersey (2008).

Rebecca Quinn (born May 24, 1971) is an American professional racing cyclist from Quakertown, Pennsylvania.

Quinn finished third in the 2007 UCI Track Cycling World Championships - Women's scratch but was relegated as she had made contact with another rider during the sprint finish.

Quinn took USA Cycling to arbitration in a Colorado Springs courtroom on July 9, 2008, after she was not selected as part of the squad for the 2008 Summer Olympics in Beijing. She claimed that Sarah Hammer was selected in her place due to favoritism as Hammer is engaged to be married to the team coach, Andy Sparks. Although the court did not find in her favor, they did order USA Cycling to pay the costs as the actions of their coaches had caused legitimate doubt over the fairness of any rider being selected.

== Palmarès ==
2004
3rdScratch, 2004 Track World Cup, Sydney
2005
1st (United States) Scratch, US National Track Championships
2nd Keirin, US National Track Championships
2nd Scratch, 2004–2005 Track World Cup, Manchester

2006
2nd Points race, US National Track Championships
2nd Scratch, US National Track Championships
2nd Scratch, 2004–2005 Track World Cup, Carson
2nd Points race, 2005–2006 Track World Cup, Carson

2007
1st (United States) Points race, US National Track Championships
2nd Scratch, US National Track Championships
2nd Team Pursuit, US National Track Championships
2nd Scratch, 2006–2007 Track World Cup, Los Angeles

2008
5th Scratch, UCI Track World Championships
