= Svetlana Pauliukaitė =

Lithuanian racing cyclist (born 1985)

Personal information
- Full name: Svetlana Pauliukaitė
- Born: 31 July 1985 (age 41) Mosėdis, Lithuanian SSR

Cycling career
- Sport: Cycling
- Disciplines: Track, Road
- Role: Rider
- Rider type: Track Cyclist

Professional teams
- 2004: Ausra Gruodis
- 2005: Team Bianchi - Alivert
- 2008: Titanedi - Frezza Acca Due O
- 2008-2010: Safi - Pasta Zara

Svetlana Pauliukaitė (born 31 July 1985 in Mosėdis) is a Lithuanian professional track and road cyclist. She has won 12 national road and track championships medals. In 2008 Pauliukaitė represented Lithuania at the 2008 Summer Olympics in track cycling events. She also represented Lithuania in three world championships in 2008, 2009 and 2010. She married with Matthias Draeger and has two children.

== Career highlights ==
2005
1st 20 km road race, National Championships, Ignalina

2006
1st Point races, National Championships

2009
5th Team pursuit, World championships, Pruszków
