= María Luisa Calle =

Colombian racing cyclist (born 1968)

María Luisa Calle Williams
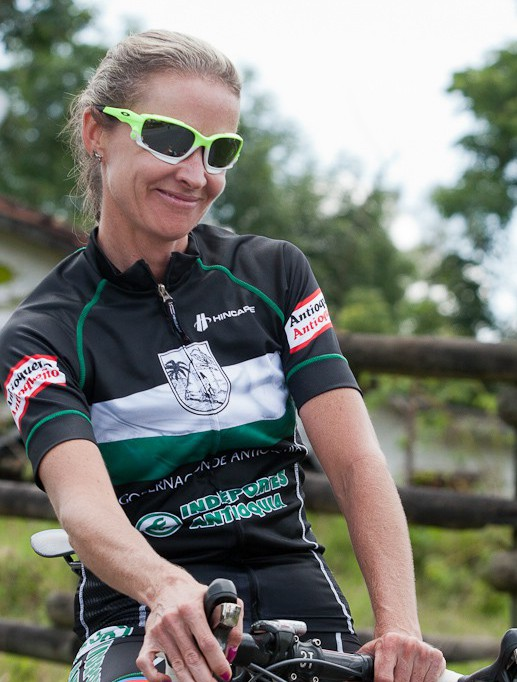

Personal information
- Full name: María Luisa Calle Williams
- Born: October 3, 1968 (age 58) Medellín, Colombia

Cycling career
- Sport: Cycling
- Current team: Banned
- Disciplines: Road and track
- Role: Rider
Medal record
Representing Colombia
Women's track cycling
Olympic Games
Bronze medal – third place	2004 Athens	Points race
World Championships
Gold medal – first place	2006 Bordeaux	Scratch
Silver medal – second place	2007 Palma de Mallorca	Scratch
Pan American Games
Gold medal – first place	2003 Santo Domingo	Individual pursuit
Gold medal – first place	2007 Rio de Janeiro	Individual pursuit
Silver medal – second place	1999 Winnipeg	Individual pursuit
Silver medal – second place	2007 Rio de Janeiro	Points race
Bronze medal – third place	1999 Winnipeg	Points race
Bronze medal – third place	2011 Guadalajara	Team pursuit
Pan American Championships
Gold medal – first place	2005 Mar del Plata	Individual pursuit
Gold medal – first place	2006 São Paulo	Individual pursuit
Gold medal – first place	2007 Valencia	Individual pursuit
Gold medal – first place	2011 Medellín	Individual pursuit
Gold medal – first place	2012 Mar del Plata	Individual pursuit
Silver medal – second place	2010 Aguascalientes	Individual pursuit
Silver medal – second place	2011 Medellín	Omnium
Silver medal – second place	2013 Mexico City	Points race
Silver medal – second place	2013 Mexico City	Team pursuit
Bronze medal – third place	2010 Aguascalientes	Omnium
Bronze medal – third place	2010 Aguascalientes	Team pursuit
Bronze medal – third place	2014 Aguascalientes	Individual pursuit
Bronze medal – third place	2014 Aguascalientes	Points race
Central American and Caribbean Games
Gold medal – first place	1998 Maracaibo	3000m Individual Pursuit
Gold medal – first place	2002 San Salvador	3000m Individual Pursuit
Gold medal – first place	2006 Cartagena	3000m Individual Pursuit
Women's road cycling
Pan American Games
Gold medal – first place	2011 Guadalajara	Time trial
Pan American Championships
Gold medal – first place	2001 Medellín	Time trial
South American Games
Gold medal – first place	2010 Medellín	Time trial
Bronze medal – third place	2010 Medellín	Road race
Central American and Caribbean Games
Gold medal – first place	2006 Cartagena	Time trial
Gold medal – first place	2014 Veracruz	Time trial

María Luisa Calle Williams (born October 3, 1968) is a Colombian professional racing cyclist. She was born in Medellín.

In the 2004 Summer Olympics, she won a bronze medal in the cycling women's points race, the first Colombian to win a medal in cycling. She was initially stripped of the medal after a positive test result for the banned stimulant heptaminol. However, the medal was reinstated after the test result was proven incorrect.

On October 16, 2011, at the 2011 Pan American Games' individual time trial, Calle, 43 years old at the time, won the gold medal with a time of 28:04.82.

On 22 July 2015, it was disclosed that she had tested positive for GHRP2 at the 2015 Pan American Games and was subsequently banned for four years.

== Major results ==
1999
1st Road Race, National Road Championships
2nd in Pan American Games, Track, Pursuit, Winnipeg (CAN)
3rd in Pan American Games, Track, Points Race, Winnipeg (CAN)
2001
1st in Pan American Championships, Track, Pursuit, Medellin (COL)
2002
1st Individual Time Trial, National Road Championships
2nd in Tour de Toona, Altoona (USA)
2004
3rd in Olympic Games, Track, Points race, Athens (GRE)
2005
1st in Pan American Championships, Track, Pursuit, Mar del Plata (ARG)
2006
1st in Pan American Championships, Track, Pursuit, Sao Paulo (BRA)
in Central American and Caribbean Games, Road, Individual Time Trial, Cartagena (COL)
2nd in Los Angeles, Pursuit (F) (USA)
1st in World Championship, Track, Scratch, Bordeaux (FRA)
2007
3rd in Los Angeles, Pursuit (F) (USA)
2nd in World Championship, Track, Scratch, Palma de Mallorca (ESP)
2nd Road race, National Road Championships
1st Individual Time Trial, National Road Championships
1st in Pan American Championships, Track, Pursuit, Valencia (VEN)
2008
2nd in Los Angeles, Pursuit (F) (USA)
2nd in Cali, Pursuit (F) (COL)
2nd in Cali, Team pursuit (F) (COL)
2010
1st in South American Games, Road, Individual time trial, Medellín (COL)
3rd in South American Games, Road, Road race, Medellín (COL)
2011
in 2011 Pan American Games, Road, Individual Time Trial, Guadalajara (MEX)
in 2011 Pan American Games, Track, Team Pursuit, Guadalajara (MEX)
1st Individual Time Trial, National Road Championships
2012
1st in Pan American Championships, Track, Pursuit, Mar del Plata (ARG)
3rd in Cali, Track Cycling World Cup, Team Pursuit (F) (COL)
2013
2nd in Aguascalientes, Track Cycling World Cup, Pursuit (F) (MEX)
Pan American Track Championships
2nd Team Pursuit
2nd Points Race
2014
Pan American Track Championships

3rd Individual Pursuit
3rd Points Race

3rd Individual Pursuit, Central American and Caribbean Games

== See also ==
- List of stripped Olympic medals
- List of doping cases in cycling

Olympic Games
Preceded by Carmenza Delgado	Flagbearer for Colombia; Beijing 2008	Succeeded by Cynthia Denzler
