= Pascale Jeuland =

French racing cyclist

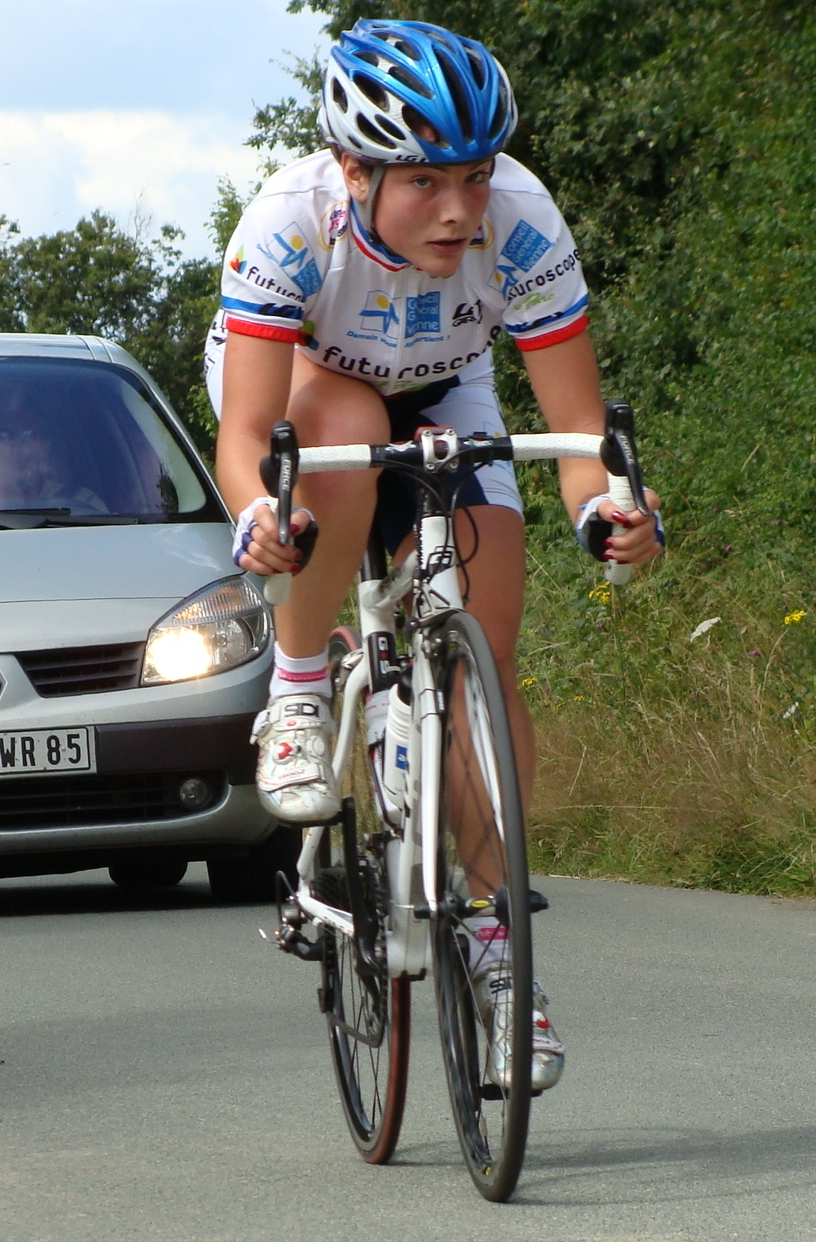
- Jeuland at the 2008 French interregional championships

Personal information
- Full name: Pascale Jeuland-Tranchant
- Born: Pascale Jeuland; 2 June 1987 (age 39) Rennes, France
- Height: 1.62 m (5 ft 4 in)
- Weight: 64 kg (141 lb; 10.1 st)

Cycling career
- Sport: Cycling
- Disciplines: Road; Track
- Role: Rider

Professional teams
- 2007–2016: Vienne Futuroscope
- 2017: SAS–Macogep
- 2018–2019: Doltcini–Van Eyck Sport
Medal record
Women's track cycling
Representing France
World Championships
Gold medal – first place	2010 Ballerup	Scratch

Pascale Jeuland-Tranchant (née Jeuland; born 2 June 1987) is a French former road and track racing cyclist, who rode professionally between 2007 and 2019 for the Poitou-Charentes.Futuroscope.86, SAS–Macogep and Doltcini–Van Eyck Sport teams. At the 2010 UCI Track Cycling World Championships, Jeuland won the gold medal in the scratch event. Her older sister is fellow road racing cyclist Nathalie Jeuland. She is married to Guillaume Tranchant.

== Major results ==
=== Track ===
2004
1st Individual pursuit, National Junior Track Championships
2005
UEC European Junior Track Championships

2nd Individual pursuit
2nd Points race
3rd Scratch

National Junior Track Championships

1st Individual pursuit
1st Points race

2006
National Track Championships

2nd Individual pursuit
3rd 500m time trial

2007
National Track Championships

1st Points race
3rd Individual pursuit

2008
1st Points race, National Track Championships
2nd Team pursuit, UEC European Under-23 Track Championships (with Audrey Cordon and Elodie Henriette)
2009
National Track Championships

1st Points race
1st Scratch
3rd Individual pursuit

2010
1st Scratch, UCI Track Cycling World Championships
National Track Championships

1st Points race
3rd Omnium

2011
National Track Championships

2nd Individual pursuit
2nd Scratch

2012
2nd Scratch, National Track Championships
2013
National Track Championships

1st Individual pursuit
1st Team pursuit

2014
National Track Championships

1st Individual pursuit
1st Scratch
1st Team pursuit

2015
1st Team pursuit, National Track Championships
1st Points race, International Belgian Open
2nd Omnium, Prova Internacional de Anadia
3rd Omnium, Revolution – Round 1, Derby
3rd Omnium, Open des Nations sur Piste de Roubaix
2016
National Track Championships

1st Omnium
1st Team pursuit
3rd Individual pursuit

Fenioux Piste International

1st Points race
1st Scratch
3rd Individual pursuit

Trofeu CAR Anadia Portugal

1st Points race
1st Individual pursuit

2018
National Track Championships

1st Points race
2nd Individual pursuit

=== Road ===
2005
9th Road race, UCI Juniors World Championships
2006
1st Road race, National Under-23 Road Championships
2007
5th Road race, UEC European Under-23 Road Championships
8th Grand Prix de Dottignies
2008
9th Overall Tour de Bretagne Féminin
2009
5th Trophée des Grimpeurs
6th Road race, UEC European Under-23 Road Championships
9th Grand Prix de Dottignies
9th Rund um die Nürnberger Altstadt
10th GP Stad Roeselare
2010
10th GP Ciudad de Valladolid
2011
6th Omloop van het Hageland
6th Ronde van Gelderland
2012
2nd Cholet Pays de Loire Dames
6th Drentse 8 van Dwingeloo
2013
7th Cholet Pays de Loire Dames
2014
1st Stage 5 Trophée d'Or Féminin
2015
2nd La Classique Morbihan
3rd Grand Prix de Dottignies
5th Cholet Pays de Loire Dames
6th Overall Tour of Chongming Island
7th Tour of Chongming Island World Cup
8th Overall Ladies Tour of Qatar
9th Overall The Women's Tour
2016
4th SwissEver GP Cham-Hagendorn
6th La Course by Le Tour de France
2018
3rd Grand Prix de Dottignies
3rd Grand Prix International d'Isbergues
4th Trofee Maarten Wynants
5th Omloop van Borsele
7th Kreiz Breizh Elites Dames
9th Diamond Tour
2019
3rd Grand Prix International d'Isbergues
7th Flanders Ladies Classic
10th Overall Tour of Chongming Island
