= Lada Kozlíková =

Czech cyclist

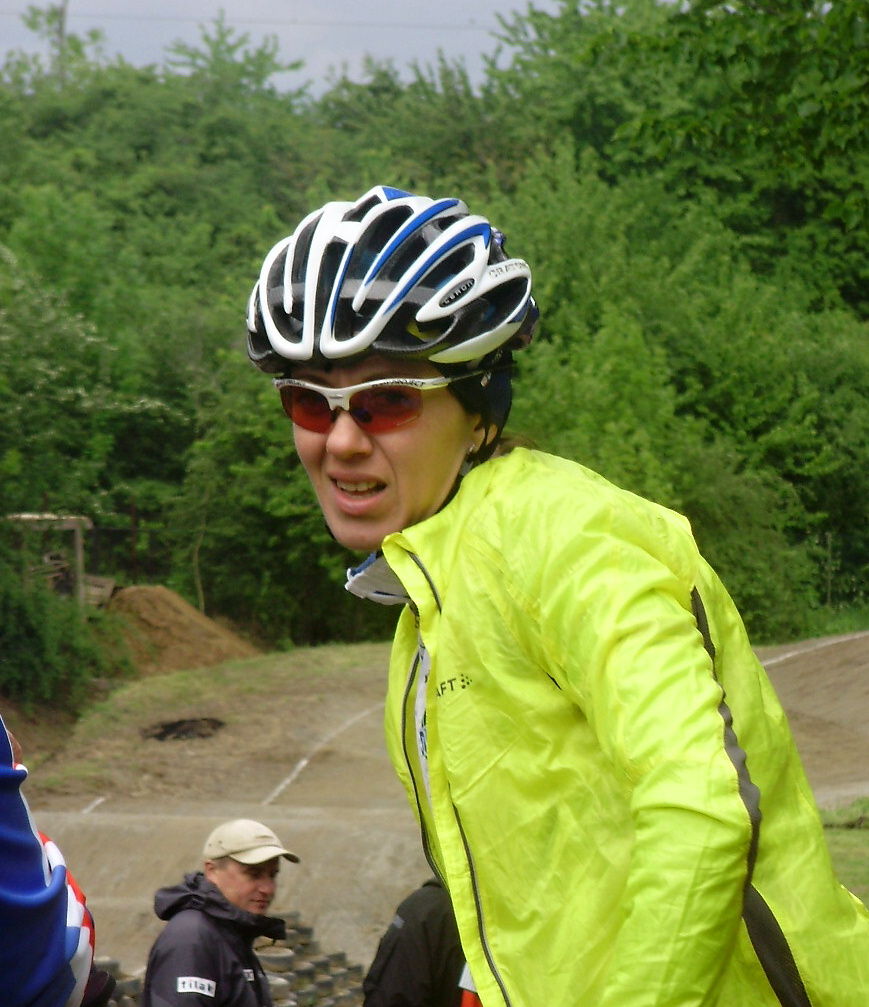
- Lada Kozlíková in 2010

Personal information
- Full name: Lada Kozlíková
- Born: 8 October 1979 (age 47) Vyškov, Czechoslovakia
- Height: 170 cm (5 ft 7 in)
- Weight: 59 kg (130 lb)

Cycling career
- Sport: Cycling
- Disciplines: Road and track
- Role: Rider
Medal record
Representing Czech Republic
Women's track cycling
World Championships
Gold medal – first place	2002 Copenhagen	Scratch race

Lada Kozlíková (born 8 October 1979) is a Czech Republic road and track racing cyclist. She won a gold medal at the 2002 UCI Track Cycling World Championships in the scratch race. She competed at the 2000, 2004 and 2008 Summer Olympics.

== Major results ==
2003
7th UCI Road World Championships – Women's time trial
2006
8th UCI Road World Championships – Women's time trial
