= 2013 UEC European Track Championships – Women's omnium =

Women's omnium at the 2013 UEC European Track Championships
- UEC European Champion jersey
- Venue: Omnisport Apeldoorn, Apeldoorn
- Date: 19-20 October
- Competitors: 16 from 16 nations

Medalists
gold medal	Laura Trott	Great Britain
silver medal	Kirsten Wild	Netherlands
bronze medal	Jolien D'Hoore	Belgium

The Women's omnium was held on 19 and 20 October 2013. 16 riders participated.

== Results ==
=== Flying lap ===
First event results:

Rank	Name	Nation	Time	Notes
1	Kirsten Wild	Netherlands	14.580	
2	Tamara Balabolina	Russia	14.760	
3	Laura Trott	Great Britain	14.789	
4	Leire Olaberria	Spain	14.829	
5	Jolien D'Hoore	Belgium	14.892	
6	Laurie Berthon	France	14.925	
7	Aušrinė Trebaitė	Lithuania	15.058	
8	Katarzyna Pawłowska	Poland	15.135	
9	Simona Frapporti	Italy	15.433	
10	Mieke Kröger	Germany	15.542	
11	Alžbeta Pavlendová	Slovakia	15.557	
12	Anna Nahirna	Ukraine	15.615	
13	Pia Pensaari	Finland	15.627	
14	Caroline Ryan	Ireland	15.731	
15	Jarmila Machačová	Czech Republic	15.738	
16	Volha Masiukovich	Belarus	15.942	

=== Points race ===
Second event results:

Rank	Name	Nation	Points	Finish order
1	Jolien D'Hoore	Belgium	45	12
2	Laura Trott	Great Britain	35	4
3	Kirsten Wild	Netherlands	35	16
4	Anna Nahirna	Ukraine	28	7
5	Aušrinė Trebaitė	Lithuania	26	10
6	Caroline Ryan	Ireland	25	1
7	Laurie Berthon	France	23	2
8	Tamara Balabolina	Russia	23	3
9	Katarzyna Pawłowska	Poland	23	5
10	Leire Olaberria	Spain	6	8
11	Volha Masiukovich	Belarus	6	9
12	Alžbeta Pavlendová	Slovakia	5	6
13	Mieke Kröger	Germany	5	13
14	Simona Frapporti	Italy	2	11
15	Jarmila Machačová	Czech Republic	1	14
16	Pia Pensaari	Finland	–40	15

=== Elimination race ===
Third event results:

Rank	Name	Nation
1	Jolien D'Hoore	Belgium
2	Kirsten Wild	Netherlands
3	Laura Trott	Great Britain
4	Katarzyna Pawłowska	Poland
5	Leire Olaberria	Spain
6	Laurie Berthon	France
7	Simona Frapporti	Italy
8	Alžbeta Pavlendová	Slovakia
9	Anna Nahirna	Ukraine
10	Volha Masiukovich	Belarus
11	Tamara Balabolina	Russia
12	Aušrinė Trebaitė	Lithuania
13	Jarmila Machačová	Czech Republic
14	Pia Pensaari	Finland
15	Caroline Ryan	Ireland
16	Mieke Kröger	Germany

=== Individual pursuit ===
Fourth event results:

Rank	Name	Nation	Time	Notes
1	Kirsten Wild	Netherlands	3:37.433	
2	Laura Trott	Great Britain	3:38.285	
3	Anna Nahirna	Ukraine	3:41.086	
4	Jolien D'Hoore	Belgium	3:43.529	
5	Caroline Ryan	Ireland	3:44.095	
6	Leire Olaberria	Spain	3:45.149	
7	Aušrinė Trebaitė	Lithuania	3:47.087	
8	Volha Masiukovich	Belarus	3:48.342	
9	Tamara Balabolina	Russia	3:49.772	
10	Mieke Kröger	Germany	3:50.855	
11	Simona Frapporti	Italy	3:50.874	
12	Katarzyna Pawłowska	Poland	3:54.446	
13	Alžbeta Pavlendová	Slovakia	3:54.947	
14	Laurie Berthon	France	3:58.597	
15	Jarmila Machačová	Czech Republic	4:01.450	
16	Pia Pensaari	Finland	4:01.847	

=== Scratch race ===
Fifth event results:

Rank	Name	Nation	Laps down
1	Kirsten Wild	Netherlands	
2	Jolien D'Hoore	Belgium	
3	Laura Trott	Great Britain	
4	Laurie Berthon	France	
5	Katarzyna Pawłowska	Poland	
6	Tamara Balabolina	Russia	
7	Anna Nahirna	Ukraine	
8	Simona Frapporti	Italy	
9	Volha Masiukovich	Belarus	
10	Caroline Ryan	Ireland	
11	Leire Olaberria	Spain	
12	Aušrinė Trebaitė	Lithuania	
13	Mieke Kröger	Germany	
14	Jarmila Machačová	Czech Republic	
15	Pia Pensaari	Finland	
16	Alžbeta Pavlendová	Slovakia	

=== Time trial ===
Sixth event results:

Rank	Name	Nation	Time
1	Laurie Berthon	France	35.996
2	Laura Trott	Great Britain	36.025
3	Tamara Balabolina	Russia	36.060
4	Leire Olaberria	Spain	36.613
5	Jolien D'Hoore	Belgium	36.641
6	Simona Frapporti	Italy	37.398
7	Kirsten Wild	Netherlands	37.409
8	Aušrinė Trebaitė	Lithuania	37.837
9	Mieke Kröger	Germany	38.014
10	Anna Nahirna	Ukraine	38.127
11	Alžbeta Pavlendová	Slovakia	38.291
12	Caroline Ryan	Ireland	38.871
13	Pia Pensaari	Finland	38.926
14	Volha Masiukovich	Belarus	38.939
15	Jarmila Machačová	Czech Republic	39.340
—	Katarzyna Pawłowska	Poland	DNS

=== Overall results ===
Final standings were as follows:

Rank	Rider	Nation	FL	PR	ER	IP	SR	TT	Total
1st place, gold medalist(s)	Laura Trott	Great Britain	3	2	3	2	3	2	15
2nd place, silver medalist(s)	Kirsten Wild	Netherlands	1	3	2	1	1	7	15
3rd place, bronze medalist(s)	Jolien D'Hoore	Belgium	5	1	1	4	2	5	18
4	Laurie Berthon	France	6	7	6	14	4	1	38
5	Tamara Balabolina	Russia	2	8	11	9	6	3	39
6	Leire Olaberria	Spain	4	10	5	6	11	4	40
7	Anna Nahirna	Ukraine	12	4	9	3	7	10	45
8	Aušrinė Trebaitė	Lithuania	7	5	12	7	12	8	51
9	Simona Frapporti	Italy	9	14	7	11	8	6	55
10	Caroline Ryan	Ireland	14	6	15	5	10	12	62
11	Volha Masiukovich	Belarus	16	11	10	8	9	14	68
12	Mieke Kröger	Germany	10	13	16	10	13	9	71
13	Alžbeta Pavlendová	Slovakia	11	12	8	13	16	11	71
14	Pia Pensaari	Finland	13	16	14	16	15	13	87
15	Jarmila Machačová	Czech Republic	15	15	13	15	14	15	87
—	Katarzyna Pawłowska	Poland	8	9	4	12	5	DNS	DNF
