= 2013 UCI Track Cycling World Championships – Women's omnium =

Rainbow jersey

The Women's omnium at the 2013 UCI Track Cycling World Championships was held February 23–24. 17 athletes participated in the contest. The final standings were determined by adding ranks in the six events.

== Medalists ==
Gold	Sarah Hammer (USA)
Silver	Laura Trott (GBR)
Bronze	Annette Edmondson (AUS)

== Individual event results ==
=== Flying Lap ===
250m flying start; the race was held at 15:50.

Rank	Name	Nation	Time
1	Annette Edmondson	Australia	14.209
2	Gillian Carleton	Canada	14.239
3	Laura Trott	United Kingdom	14.325
4	Sarah Hammer	United States	14.471
5	Leire Olaberria	Spain	14.535
6	Katarzyna Pawłowska	Poland	14.591
7	Tamara Balabolina	Russia	14.651
8	Huang Li	China	14.718
9	Laurie Berthon	France	14.734
10	Xiao Juan Diao	Hong Kong	14.994
11	Lucie Záleská	Czech Republic	15.063
12	Lisa Brennauer	Germany	15.098
13	Els Belmans	Belgium	15.201
13	Volha Masiukovich	Belarus	15.322
15	Ivanna Borovychenko	Ukraine	15.364
16	Alžbeta Pavlendová	Slovakia	15.402
17	Simona Frapporti	Italy	15.679

=== Points Race ===
The points race was 80 laps (20 km) with 8 sprints; the race was held at 17:20.

Rank	Name	Nation	Points
1	Lisa Brennauer	Germany	29
2	Katarzyna Pawłowska	Poland	27
3	Sarah Hammer	United States	25
4	Huang Li	China	25
5	Els Belmans	Belgium	23
6	Simona Frapporti	Italy	22
7	Xiao Juan Diao	Hong Kong	20
8	Annette Edmondson	Australia	15
9	Leire Olaberria	Spain	10
10	Laura Trott	United Kingdom	9
11	Ivanna Borovychenko	Ukraine	8
12	Gillian Carleton	Canada	7
13	Laurie Berthon	France	5
14	Tamara Balabolina	Russia	3
15	Volha Masiukovich	Belarus	0
16	Alžbeta Pavlendová	Slovakia	0
17	Lucie Záleská	Czech Republic	0

=== Elimination race ===
An elimination race ended day one; the race was held at 21:45.

Rank	Name	Nation
1	Laura Trott	United Kingdom
2	Sarah Hammer	United States
3	Katarzyna Pawłowska	Poland
4	Lisa Brennauer	Germany
5	Leire Olaberria	Spain
6	Annette Edmondson	Australia
7	Simona Frapporti	Italy
8	Huang Li	China
9	Lucie Záleská	Czech Republic
10	Ivanna Borovychenko	Ukraine
11	Xiao Juan Diao	Hong Kong
12	Tamara Balabolina	Russia
13	Alžbeta Pavlendová	Slovakia
14	Laurie Berthon	France
15	Volha Masiukovich	Belarus
16	Gillian Carleton	Canada
17	Els Belmans	Belgium

=== Individual Pursuit ===
3 km individual pursuit started day two; the race was held at 10:00.

Rank	Name	Nation	Time
1	Sarah Hammer	United States	3:31.550
2	Gillian Carleton	Canada	3:33.486
3	Laura Trott	United Kingdom	3:34.716
4	Annette Edmondson	Australia	3:40.260
5	Katarzyna Pawłowska	Poland	3:41.261
6	Leire Olaberria	Spain	3:41.830
7	Lisa Brennauer	Germany	3:42.624
8	Tamara Balabolina	Russia	3:45.514
9	Huang Li	China	3:45.742
10	Simona Frapporti	Italy	3:46.188
11	Ivanna Borovychenko	Ukraine	3:46.534
12	Lucie Záleská	Czech Republic	3:48.020
13	Els Belmans	Belgium	3:51.637
14	Volha Masiukovich	Belarus	3:53.098
15	Laurie Berthon	France	3:54.289
16	Xiao Juan Diao	Hong Kong	3:54.774
17	Alžbeta Pavlendová	Slovakia	3:59.005

=== Scratch Race ===
A 10 km scratch race was the second event on day two; the race was held at 11:25.

Rank	Name	Nation	Laps down
1	Els Belmans	Belgium	
2	Laurie Berthon	France	−1
3	Laura Trott	United Kingdom	−1
4	Sarah Hammer	United States	−1
5	Annette Edmondson	Australia	−1
6	Gillian Carleton	Canada	−1
7	Lisa Brennauer	Germany	−1
8	Huang Li	China	−1
9	Katarzyna Pawłowska	Poland	−1
10	Tamara Balabolina	Russia	−1
11	Leire Olaberria	Spain	−1
12	Xiao Juan Diao	Hong Kong	−1
13	Ivanna Borovychenko	Ukraine	−1
14	Simona Frapporti	Italy	−1
15	Lucie Záleská	Czech Republic	−1
16	Volha Masiukovich	Belarus	−1
	Alžbeta Pavlendová	Slovakia	DNS

=== 500 m Time Trial ===
The last event was 500 m time trial; the race was held at 14:10.

Rank	Name	Nation	Time
1	Gillian Carleton	Canada	35.510
2	Annette Edmondson	Australia	35.533
3	Tamara Balabolina	Russia	35.628
4	Laura Trott	United Kingdom	35.675
5	Leire Olaberria	Spain	35.866
6	Sarah Hammer	United States	36.053
7	Katarzyna Pawłowska	Poland	36.374
8	Laurie Berthon	France	36.697
9	Huang Li	China	36.920
10	Lisa Brennauer	Germany	37.194
11	Els Belmans	Belgium	37.502
12	Lucie Záleská	Czech Republic	37.522
13	Simona Frapporti	Italy	37.600
14	Xiao Juan Diao	Hong Kong	38.136
15	Volha Masiukovich	Belarus	38.550
16	Ivanna Borovychenko	Ukraine	38.566

== Final standings ==
The final result after six events.

Rank	Name	Nation	Points
1st place, gold medalist(s)	Sarah Hammer	United States	20
2nd place, silver medalist(s)	Laura Trott	United Kingdom	24
3rd place, bronze medalist(s)	Annette Edmondson	Australia	26
4	Katarzyna Pawłowska	Poland	32
5	Gillian Carleton	Canada	39
6	Leire Olaberria	Spain	41
7	Lisa Brennauer	Germany	41
8	Huang Li	China	46
9	Tamara Balabolina	Russia	54
10	Els Belmans	Belgium	60
11	Laurie Berthon	France	61
12	Simona Frapporti	Italy	67
13	Xiao Juan Diao	Hong Kong	70
14	Ivanna Borovychenko	Ukraine	76
15	Lucie Záleská	Czech Republic	76
16	Volha Masiukovich	Belarus	89
17	Alžbeta Pavlendová	Slovakia	DNF
