= 2018 UCI Track Cycling World Championships – Women's team pursuit =

Women's team pursuit at the 2018 UCI Track Cycling World Championships
- Venue: Omnisport Apeldoorn
- Location: Apeldoorn, Netherlands
- Dates: 28 February–1 March
- Competitors: 52 from 13 nations
- Teams: 13
- Winning time: 4:15.669

Medalists
gold medal	Jennifer Valente; Kelly Catlin; Chloé Dygert; Kimberly Geist	United States
silver medal	Katie Archibald; Elinor Barker; Laura Kenny; Emily Nelson; Ellie Dickinson	Great Britain
bronze medal	Elisa Balsamo; Letizia Paternoster; Silvia Valsecchi; Tatiana Guderzo; Simona Frapporti	Italy

The women's team pursuit competition at the 2018 UCI Track Cycling World Championships was held on 28 February and 1 March 2018 at Omnisport Apeldoorn in Apeldoorn, Netherlands.

== Results ==
=== Qualifying ===
The eight fastest teams advanced to the first round.

Rank	Nation	Time	Behind	Notes
1	United States; Jennifer Valente; Kelly Catlin; Chloé Dygert; Kimberly Geist	4:18.836		Q
2	Great Britain; Katie Archibald; Elinor Barker; Laura Kenny; Emily Nelson	4:19.177	+0.341	Q
3	Italy; Elisa Balsamo; Letizia Paternoster; Simona Frapporti; Tatiana Guderzo	4:21.543	+2.707	Q
4	New Zealand; Rushlee Buchanan; Bryony Botha; Kirstie James; Racquel Sheath	4:23.530	+4.694	Q
5	Canada; Allison Beveridge; Ariane Bonhomme; Annie Foreman-Mackey; Stephanie Roorda	4:24.071	+5.235	q
6	Germany; Gudrun Stock; Charlotte Becker; Franziska Brauße; Lisa Brennauer	4:26.746	+7.910	q
7	France; Laurie Berthon; Coralie Demay; Marion Borras; Marie Le Net	4:29.627	+10.791	q
8	Poland; Daria Pikulik; Katarzyna Pawłowska; Justyna Kaczkowska; Nikol Płosaj	4:29.799	+10.963	q
9	Japan; Yumi Kajihara; Kie Furuyama; Yuya Hashimoto; Kisato Nakamura	4:30.955	+12.119	
10	China; Wang Xiaofei; Liu Jiali; Ma Menglu; Wang Hong	4:32.389	+13.553	
11	Russia; Aleksandra Goncharova; Gulnaz Badykova; Anastasiia Iakovenko; Olga Zabelinskaya	4:32.652	+13.816	
12	Belgium; Lotte Kopecky; Gilke Croket; Annelies Dom; Saartje Vandenbroucke	4:33.076	+14.240	
13	Belarus; Polina Pivovarova; Ina Savenka; Anastasiya Dzedzikava; Hanna Tserakh	4:34.254	+15.418	

=== First round ===
First round heats were held as follows:
Heat 1: 6th v 7th fastest
Heat 2: 5th v 8th fastest
Heat 3: 2nd v 3rd fastest
Heat 4: 1st v 4th fastest

The winners of heats three and four proceeded to the gold medal race. The remaining six teams were ranked on time, from which the top two proceeded to the bronze medal race.

Rank	Heat	Nation	Time	Notes
1	4	United States; Jennifer Valente; Kelly Catlin; Chloé Dygert; Kimberly Geist	4:16.340	QG
2	3	Great Britain; Katie Archibald; Elinor Barker; Laura Kenny; Eleanor Dickinson	4:19.397	QG
3	3	Italy; Elisa Balsamo; Letizia Paternoster; Silvia Valsecchi; Tatiana Guderzo	4:20.647	QB
4	2	Canada; Allison Beveridge; Ariane Bonhomme; Annie Foreman-Mackey; Stephanie Roorda	4:21.780	QB
5	1	Germany; Gudrun Stock; Charlotte Becker; Franziska Brauße; Lisa Brennauer	4:24.369	
6	4	New Zealand; Rushlee Buchanan; Bryony Botha; Michaela Drummond; Racquel Sheath	4:25.384	
7	1	France; Laurie Berthon; Coralie Demay; Marion Borras; Marie Le Net	4:27.273	
8	2	Poland; Daria Pikulik; Katarzyna Pawłowska; Justyna Kaczkowska; Nikol Płosaj	4:32.169	

- QG = qualified for gold medal final
- QB = qualified for bronze medal final

=== Finals ===
The final classification was determined in the medal finals.

Rank	Nation	Time	Gap	Notes
Gold medal race
1st place, gold medalist(s)	United States; Jennifer Valente; Kelly Catlin; Chloé Dygert; Kimberly Geist	4:15.669		
2nd place, silver medalist(s)	Great Britain; Katie Archibald; Elinor Barker; Laura Kenny; Emily Nelson	4:16.980	+1.311	
Bronze medal race
3rd place, bronze medalist(s)	Italy; Elisa Balsamo; Letizia Paternoster; Silvia Valsecchi; Tatiana Guderzo	4:20.202		
4	Canada; Allison Beveridge; Ariane Bonhomme; Annie Foreman-Mackey; Stephanie Roorda	4:23.216	+3.014	
