= 2011 European Track Championships – Women's omnium =

UEC European Champion jersey

The Women's omnium was held on 22–23 October 2011. 18 riders participated over six competitions.

== Medalists ==
Gold	Laura Trott (GBR)
Silver	Tatsiana Sharakova (BLR)
Bronze	Kirsten Wild (NED)

== Results ==
=== Flying lap ===
The flying lap was held at 15:34.

Rank	Name	Nation	Time	Notes
1	Kirsten Wild	Netherlands	14.697	
2	Tatsiana Sharakova	Belarus	14.847	
3	Leire Olaberria	Spain	14.871	
4	Małgorzata Wojtyra	Poland	14.882	
5	Laura Trott	Great Britain	14.903	
6	Lisa Brennauer	Germany	15.028	
7	Jolien D'Hoore	Belgium	15.133	
8	Evgenia Romanyuta	Russia	15.249	
9	Lucie Záleská	Czech Republic	15.386	
10	Pascale Jeuland	France	15.630	
11	Aušrinė Trebaitė	Lithuania	15.652	
12	Caroline Ryan	Ireland	15.706	
13	Anna Nahirna	Ukraine	15.749	
14	Alžbeta Pavlendová	Slovakia	16.027	
15	Julie Leth	Denmark	16.037	
16	Andrea Wölfer	Switzerland	16.070	
17	Marta Tagliaferro	Italy	16.110	
18	Sari Saarelainen	Finland	17.503	

=== Points race ===
The race was held at 19:42.

Rank	Name	Nation	Laps	Points
1	Pascale Jeuland	France	1	20
2	Aušrinė Trebaitė	Lithuania	0	11
3	Leire Olaberria	Spain	0	10
4	Tatsiana Sharakova	Belarus	0	9
5	Kirsten Wild	Netherlands	0	8
6	Małgorzata Wojtyra	Poland	0	8
7	Laura Trott	Great Britain	0	7
8	Julie Leth	Denmark	0	7
9	Marta Tagliaferro	Italy	0	5
10	Lisa Brennauer	Germany	0	5
11	Evgenia Romanyuta	Russia	0	5
12	Jolien D'Hoore	Belgium	0	5
13	Caroline Ryan	Ireland	0	5
14	Lucie Záleská	Czech Republic	0	2
15	Alžbeta Pavlendová	Slovakia	0	1
16	Anna Nahirna	Ukraine	0	0
17	Andrea Wölfer	Switzerland	0	0
–	Sari Saarelainen	Finland	−2	DNF

=== Elimination race ===
The race was held at 21:13.

Rank	Name	Nation
1	Laura Trott	Great Britain
2	Małgorzata Wojtyra	Poland
3	Leire Olaberria	Spain
4	Jolien D'Hoore	Belgium
5	Julie Leth	Denmark
6	Lisa Brennauer	Germany
7	Marta Tagliaferro	Italy
8	Alžbeta Pavlendová	Slovakia
9	Kirsten Wild	Netherlands
10	Pascale Jeuland	France
11	Lucie Záleská	Czech Republic
12	Caroline Ryan	Ireland
13	Evgenia Romanyuta	Russia
14	Andrea Wölfer	Switzerland
15	Aušrinė Trebaitė	Lithuania
16	Tatsiana Sharakova	Belarus
17	Anna Nahirna	Ukraine
18	Sari Saarelainen	Finland

=== Individual pursuit ===
The race was held at 13:30.

Rank	Name	Nation	Time	Notes
1	Laura Trott	Great Britain	3:36.377	
2	Tatsiana Sharakova	Belarus	3:37.617	
3	Kirsten Wild	Netherlands	3:39.343	
4	Lisa Brennauer	Germany	3:39.689	
5	Aušrinė Trebaitė	Lithuania	3:44.524	
6	Evgenia Romanyuta	Russia	3:44.661	
7	Caroline Ryan	Ireland	3:45.030	
8	Anna Nahirna	Ukraine	3:46.250	
9	Pascale Jeuland	France	3:48.266	
10	Leire Olaberria	Spain	3:48.313	
11	Małgorzata Wojtyra	Poland	3:49.317	
12	Jolien D'Hoore	Belgium	3:49.496	
13	Julie Leth	Denmark	3:51.988	
14	Lucie Záleská	Czech Republic	3:54.840	
15	Marta Tagliaferro	Italy	3:57.194	
16	Andrea Wölfer	Switzerland	4:02.540	
17	Alžbeta Pavlendová	Slovakia	4:02.710	
18	Sari Saarelainen	Finland	4:05.100	

=== Scratch race ===
The race was held at 16:06.

Rank	Name	Nation	Laps down
1	Jolien D'Hoore	Belgium	
2	Evgenia Romanyuta	Russia	
3	Tatsiana Sharakova	Belarus	
4	Aušrinė Trebaitė	Lithuania	
5	Andrea Wölfer	Switzerland	
6	Kirsten Wild	Netherlands	−1
7	Małgorzata Wojtyra	Poland	−1
8	Marta Tagliaferro	Italy	−1
9	Lucie Záleská	Czech Republic	−1
10	Laura Trott	Great Britain	−1
11	Pascale Jeuland	France	−1
12	Leire Olaberria	Spain	−1
13	Lisa Brennauer	Germany	−1
14	Alžbeta Pavlendová	Slovakia	−1
15	Julie Leth	Denmark	−1
16	Anna Nahirna	Ukraine	−1
17	Caroline Ryan	Ireland	−1
18	Sari Saarelainen	Finland	−1

=== 500m time trial ===
The race was held at 18:01.

Rank	Name	Nation	Time
1	Laura Trott	Great Britain	35.559
2	Tatsiana Sharakova	Belarus	35.732
3	Małgorzata Wojtyra	Poland	35.904
4	Evgenia Romanyuta	Russia	36.470
5	Jolien D'Hoore	Belgium	36.647
6	Lisa Brennauer	Germany	36.705
7	Aušrinė Trebaitė	Lithuania	37.176
8	Kirsten Wild	Netherlands	37.244
9	Lucie Záleská	Czech Republic	37.485
10	Leire Olaberria	Spain	38.337
11	Pascale Jeuland	France	38.349
12	Caroline Ryan	Ireland	38.438
13	Julie Leth	Denmark	38.789
14	Anna Nahirna	Ukraine	38.971
15	Alžbeta Pavlendová	Slovakia	39.068
16	Andrea Wölfer	Switzerland	39.129
17	Marta Tagliaferro	Italy	39.258

== Final Classification ==
After six events.

Rank	Name	Nation	Total
1st place, gold medalist(s)	Laura Trott	Great Britain	25
2nd place, silver medalist(s)	Tatsiana Sharakova	Belarus	29
3rd place, bronze medalist(s)	Kirsten Wild	Netherlands	32
4	Małgorzata Wojtyra	Poland	33
5	Jolien D'Hoore	Belgium	41
6	Leire Olaberria	Spain	41
7	Evgenia Romanyuta	Russia	44
8	Aušrinė Trebaitė	Lithuania	44
9	Lisa Brennauer	Germany	45
10	Pascale Jeuland	France	52
11	Lucie Záleská	Czech Republic	66
12	Julie Leth	Denmark	69
13	Caroline Ryan	Ireland	73
14	Marta Tagliaferro	Italy	73
15	Alžbeta Pavlendová	Slovakia	83
16	Anna Nahirna	Ukraine	84
17	Andrea Wölfer	Switzerland	84
–	Sari Saarelainen	Finland	108
