= 2020 UEC European Track Championships – Women's omnium =

Women's omnium at the 2020 UEC European Track Championships
- Venue: Kolodruma, Plovdiv
- Date: 13 November
- Competitors: 13 from 13 nations
- Winning points: 135

Medalists
gold medal	Elisa Balsamo	Italy
silver medal	Laura Kenny	Great Britain
bronze medal	Maria Novolodskaya	Russia

The women's omnium competition at the 2020 UEC European Track Championships will be held on 13 November 2020.

== Results ==
=== Scratch race ===
Rank	Name	Nation	Laps down	Event points
1	Elisa Balsamo	Italy		40
2	Laura Kenny	Great Britain		38
3	Aline Seitz	Switzerland		36
4	Maria Martins	Portugal		34
5	Olivija Baleišytė	Lithuania		32
6	Petra Ševčíková	Czech Republic		30
7	Maria Novolodskaya	Russia		28
8	Nikol Płosaj	Poland		26
9	Eukene Larrarte	Spain		24
10	Alžbeta Bačíková	Slovakia		22
11	Anna Nahirna	Ukraine		20
12	Ina Savenka	Belarus		18
13	Johanna Kitti Borissza	Hungary		16

=== Tempo race ===
Rank	Name	Nation	Points in race	Event points
1	Maria Novolodskaya	Russia	26	40
2	Nikol Płosaj	Poland	24	38
3	Maria Martins	Portugal	24	36
4	Ina Savenka	Belarus	21	34
5	Laura Kenny	Great Britain	5	32
6	Elisa Balsamo	Italy	3	30
7	Olivija Baleišytė	Lithuania	2	28
8	Anna Nahirna	Ukraine	1	26
9	Petra Ševčíková	Czech Republic	0	24
10	Aline Seitz	Switzerland	0	22
11	Eukene Larrarte	Spain	0	20
12	Johanna Kitti Borissza	Hungary	0	18
13	Alžbeta Bačíková	Slovakia	0	16

=== Elimination race ===
Rank	Name	Nation	Event points
1	Elisa Balsamo	Italy	40
2	Laura Kenny	Great Britain	38
3	Olivija Baleišytė	Lithuania	36
4	Nikol Płosaj	Poland	34
5	Eukene Larrarte	Spain	32
6	Maria Martins	Portugal	30
7	Alžbeta Bačíková	Slovakia	28
8	Ina Savenka	Belarus	26
9	Aline Seitz	Switzerland	24
10	Maria Novolodskaya	Russia	22
11	Anna Nahirna	Ukraine	20
12	Johanna Kitti Borissza	Hungary	18
13	Petra Ševčíková	Czech Republic	16

=== Points race and final standings ===
The final ranking is given by the sum of the points obtained in the 4 specialties.

Overall rank	Name	Nation	Scratch race	Tempo race	Elim. race	Subotal	Lap points	Sprint points	Finish order	Total points
1st place, gold medalist(s)	Elisa Balsamo	Italy	40	30	40	110	0	25	11	135
2nd place, silver medalist(s)	Laura Kenny	Great Britain	38	32	38	108	0	18	3	126
3rd place, bronze medalist(s)	Maria Novolodskaya	Russia	28	40	22	90	20	4	6	114
4	Nikol Płosaj	Poland	26	38	34	98	0	13	2	111
5	Maria Martins	Portugal	34	36	30	100	0	10	5	110
6	Olivija Baleišytė	Lithuania	32	28	36	96	0	7	4	103
7	Ina Savenka	Belarus	18	34	26	78	20	3	8	101
8	Aline Seitz	Switzerland	36	22	24	82	0	18	1	100
9	Eukene Larrarte	Spain	24	20	32	76	0	1	9	77
10	Petra Ševčíková	Czech Republic	30	24	16	70	0	0	7	70
11	Anna Nahirna	Ukraine	20	26	20	66	0	0	10	66
12	Alžbeta Bačíková	Slovakia	22	16	28	66	0	0	12	66
13	Johanna Kitti Borissza	Hungary	16	18	18	52	–20	0	13	32
