= 2019 UEC European Track Championships – Women's omnium =

Women's omnium at the 2019 UEC European Track Championships
- Venue: Omnisport Apeldoorn, Apeldoorn
- Date: 18 October
- Competitors: 21 from 21 nations
- Winning points: 116

Medalists
gold medal	Kirsten Wild	Netherlands
silver medal	Laura Kenny	Great Britain
bronze medal	Tatsiana Sharakova	Belarus

The women's omnium competition at the 2019 UEC European Track Championships was held on 18 October 2019.

== Results ==
=== Scratch race ===
Rank	Name	Nation	Laps down	Event points
1	Laura Kenny	Great Britain		40
2	Letizia Paternoster	Italy		38
3	Clara Copponi	France		36
4	Kirsten Wild	Netherlands		34
5	Amalie Dideriksen	Denmark		32
6	Anita Stenberg	Norway		30
7	Daria Pikulik	Poland		28
8	Maria Martins	Portugal		26
9	Aline Seitz	Switzerland		24
10	Gudrun Stock	Germany		22
11	Lotte Kopecky	Belgium		20
12	Petra Ševčíková	Czech Republic		18
13	Olivija Baleišytė	Lithuania		16
14	Lydia Boylan	Ireland		14
15	Verena Eberhardt	Austria		12
16	Tatsiana Sharakova	Belarus		10
17	Tetyana Klimchenko	Ukraine		8
18	Maria Rostovtseva	Russia		6
19	Johanna Kitti Borissza	Hungary		4
20	Ana Usabiaga	Spain		2
21	Alžbeta Bačíková	Slovakia		2

=== Tempo race ===
Rank	Name	Nation	Points in race	Event points
1	Gudrun Stock	Germany	22	40
2	Tatsiana Sharakova	Belarus	21	38
3	Clara Copponi	France	8	36
4	Tetyana Klimchenko	Ukraine	7	34
5	Amalie Dideriksen	Denmark	4	32
6	Daria Pikulik	Poland	2	30
7	Kirsten Wild	Netherlands	1	28
8	Olivija Baleišytė	Lithuania	0	26
9	Verena Eberhardt	Austria	0	24
10	Laura Kenny	Great Britain	0	22
11	Letizia Paternoster	Italy	0	20
12	Lotte Kopecky	Belgium	0	18
13	Aline Seitz	Switzerland	0	16
14	Maria Martins	Portugal	0	14
15	Lydia Boylan	Ireland	0	12
16	Anita Stenberg	Norway	0	10
17	Johanna Kitti Borissza	Hungary	0	8
18	Ana Usabiaga	Spain	0	6
19	Alžbeta Bačíková	Slovakia	0	4
20	Petra Ševčíková	Czech Republic	0	2
21	Maria Rostovtseva	Russia	–20	1

=== Elimination race ===
Rank	Name	Nation	Event points
1	Kirsten Wild	Netherlands	40
2	Letizia Paternoster	Italy	38
3	Laura Kenny	Great Britain	36
4	Daria Pikulik	Poland	34
5	Maria Martins	Portugal	32
6	Amalie Dideriksen	Denmark	30
7	Tatsiana Sharakova	Belarus	28
8	Gudrun Stock	Germany	26
9	Lotte Kopecky	Belgium	24
10	Alžbeta Bačíková	Slovakia	22
11	Clara Copponi	France	20
12	Aline Seitz	Switzerland	18
13	Tetyana Klimchenko	Ukraine	16
14	Verena Eberhardt	Austria	14
15	Lydia Boylan	Ireland	12
16	Petra Ševčíková	Czech Republic	10
17	Olivija Baleišytė	Lithuania	8
18	Johanna Kitti Borissza	Hungary	6
19	Anita Stenberg	Norway	4
20	Ana Usabiaga	Spain	2
	Maria Rostovtseva	Russia	DSQ

=== Points race and final standings ===
The final ranking is given by the sum of the points obtained in the 4 specialties.

Overall rank	Name	Nation	Scratch race	Tempo race	Elim. race	Subotal	Lap points	Sprint points	Finish order	Total points
1st place, gold medalist(s)	Kirsten Wild	Netherlands	34	28	40	102	0	14	4	116
2nd place, silver medalist(s)	Laura Kenny	Great Britain	40	22	36	98	0	16	3	114
3rd place, bronze medalist(s)	Tatsiana Sharakova	Belarus	10	38	28	76	20	16	1	112
4	Daria Pikulik	Poland	28	30	34	92	0	14	8	106
5	Letizia Paternoster	Italy	38	20	38	96	0	8	17	104
6	Amalie Dideriksen	Denmark	32	32	30	94	0	6	20	100
7	Clara Copponi	France	36	36	20	92	0	5	6	97
8	Maria Martins	Portugal	26	14	32	72	20	3	11	95
9	Gudrun Stock	Germany	22	40	26	88	0	1	12	89
10	Lotte Kopecky	Belgium	20	18	24	62	20	5	13	87
11	Aline Seitz	Switzerland	24	16	18	58	20	3	5	81
12	Tetyana Klimchenko	Ukraine	8	34	16	58	0	6	2	64
13	Verena Eberhardt	Austria	12	24	14	50	0	0	7	50
14	Olivija Baleišytė	Lithuania	16	26	8	50	0	0	16	50
15	Anita Stenberg	Norway	30	10	4	44	0	2	10	46
16	Lydia Boylan	Ireland	14	12	12	38	0	0	14	38
17	Alžbeta Bačíková	Slovakia	2	4	22	30	0	0	18	30
18	Ana Usabiaga	Spain	2	6	2	12	0	0	9	12
19	Johanna Kitti Borissza	Hungary	4	8	6	12	0	0	19	12
20	Petra Ševčíková	Czech Republic	18	2	10	32	–60	0	15	–28
	Maria Rostovtseva	Russia	6	1	DSQ	DSQ				DSQ
