= 2014 UCI Track Cycling World Championships – Women's omnium =

Track cycling event

The Women's omnium at the 2014 UCI Track Cycling World Championships was held on 1–2 March 2014. 17 cyclists participated in the contest. The final standings were determined by adding ranks in the six events; the rider with the lowest cumulative score won the gold medal.

== Medalists ==
Gold	Sarah Hammer (USA)
Silver	Laura Trott (GBR)
Bronze	Annette Edmondson (AUS)

== Results ==
=== Flying lap ===
The flying lap was held at 12:40.

Rank	Name	Nation	Time
1	Annette Edmondson	Australia	14.027
2	Sarah Hammer	United States	14.165
3	Laura Trott	Great Britain	14.211
4	Marlies Mejías	Cuba	14.256
5	Jolien D'Hoore	Belgium	14.321
6	Laurie Berthon	France	14.465
7	Leire Olaberria	Spain	14.518
8	Katarzyna Pawłowska	Poland	14.550
9	Laura Brown	Canada	14.559
10	Tamara Balabolina	Russia	14.719
11	Sakura Tsukagoshi	Japan	14.808
12	Simona Frapporti	Italy	14.892
13	Diao Xiao Juan	Hong Kong	14.951
14	Alžbeta Pavlendová	Slovakia	15.076
15	Milena Salcedo	Colombia	15.141
16	Katsiaryna Barazna	Belarus	15.228
17	Hanna Solovey	Ukraine	15.394

=== Points race ===
The points race was held at 15:00.

Rank	Name	Nation	Points
1	Sarah Hammer	United States	25
2	Milena Salcedo	Colombia	22
3	Laura Trott	Great Britain	14
4	Jolien D'Hoore	Belgium	13
5	Katarzyna Pawłowska	Poland	13
6	Katsiaryna Barazna	Belarus	4
7	Hanna Solovey	Ukraine	3
8	Tamara Balabolina	Russia	3
9	Laura Brown	Canada	0
10	Diao Xiao Juan	Hong Kong	0
11	Annette Edmondson	Australia	−11
12	Leire Olaberria	Spain	−14
13	Laurie Berthon	France	−14
14	Simona Frapporti	Italy	−15
15	Marlies Mejías	Cuba	−17
16	Alžbeta Pavlendová	Slovakia	−18
17	Sakura Tsukagoshi	Japan	−20

=== Elimination race ===
The elimination race was held at 22:03.

Rank	Name	Nation
1	Sarah Hammer	United States
2	Jolien D'Hoore	Belgium
3	Annette Edmondson	Australia
4	Laura Trott	Great Britain
5	Leire Olaberria	Spain
6	Laura Brown	Canada
7	Milena Salcedo	Colombia
8	Tamara Balabolina	Russia
9	Laurie Berthon	France
10	Katarzyna Pawłowska	Poland
11	Alžbeta Pavlendová	Slovakia
12	Katsiaryna Barazna	Belarus
13	Simona Frapporti	Italy
14	Sakura Tsukagoshi	Japan
15	Marlies Mejías	Cuba
16	Diao Xiao Juan	Hong Kong
17	Hanna Solovey	Ukraine

=== Individual pursuit ===
The individual pursuit was held at 12:20.

Rank	Name	Nation	Time
1	Sarah Hammer	United States	3:32.761
2	Laura Trott	Great Britain	3:33.885
3	Katarzyna Pawłowska	Poland	3:36.599
4	Laura Brown	Canada	3:37.045
5	Annette Edmondson	Australia	3:37.106
6	Hanna Solovey	Ukraine	3:37.904
7	Tamara Balabolina	Russia	3:38.367
8	Leire Olaberria	Spain	3:39.412
9	Simona Frapporti	Italy	3:40.437
10	Jolien D'Hoore	Belgium	3:41.305
11	Marlies Mejías	Cuba	3:41.445
12	Milena Salcedo	Colombia	3:45.630
13	Laurie Berthon	France	3:46.027
14	Diao Xiao Juan	Hong Kong	3:48.147
15	Katsiaryna Barazna	Belarus	3:48.647
16	Sakura Tsukagoshi	Japan	3:49.577
17	Alžbeta Pavlendová	Slovakia	3:50.849

=== Scratch race ===
The scratch race was held at 15:40.

Rank	Name	Nation	Laps down
1	Diao Xiao Juan	Hong Kong	
2	Katsiaryna Barazna	Belarus	−1
3	Annette Edmondson	Australia	−1
4	Laurie Berthon	France	−1
5	Sarah Hammer	United States	−1
6	Laura Trott	Great Britain	−1
7	Leire Olaberria	Spain	−1
8	Jolien D'Hoore	Belgium	−1
9	Alžbeta Pavlendová	Slovakia	−1
10	Katarzyna Pawłowska	Poland	−1
11	Tamara Balabolina	Russia	−1
12	Hanna Solovey	Ukraine	−1
13	Marlies Mejías	Cuba	−1
14	Simona Frapporti	Italy	−1
15	Laura Brown	Canada	−1
16	Sakura Tsukagoshi	Japan	−1
17	Milena Salcedo	Colombia	−1

=== 500m time trial ===
The 500m time trial was held at 16:25.

Rank	Name	Nation	Time
1	Annette Edmondson	Australia	34.995
2	Laura Trott	Great Britain	35.456
3	Marlies Mejías	Cuba	35.516
4	Sarah Hammer	United States	35.571
5	Laurie Berthon	France	35.607
6	Jolien D'Hoore	Belgium	35.757
7	Leire Olaberria	Spain	35.916
8	Tamara Balabolina	Russia	35.997
9	Laura Brown	Canada	36.352
10	Milena Salcedo	Colombia	36.765
11	Diao Xiao Juan	Hong Kong	36.816
12	Simona Frapporti	Italy	36.894
13	Katarzyna Pawłowska	Poland	36.978
14	Sakura Tsukagoshi	Japan	37.136
15	Katsiaryna Barazna	Belarus	37.464
16	Hanna Solovey	Ukraine	37.722
17	Alžbeta Pavlendová	Slovakia	38.124

=== Final standings ===
After all events.

Rank	Name	Nation	Points
1st place, gold medalist(s)	Sarah Hammer	United States	14
2nd place, silver medalist(s)	Laura Trott	Great Britain	20
3rd place, bronze medalist(s)	Annette Edmondson	Australia	24
4	Jolien D'Hoore	Belgium	35
5	Leire Olaberria	Spain	46
6	Katarzyna Pawłowska	Poland	49
7	Laurie Berthon	France	50
8	Laura Brown	Canada	52
9	Tamara Balabolina	Russia	52
10	Marlies Mejías	Cuba	61
11	Milena Salcedo	Colombia	63
12	Diao Xiao Juan	Hong Kong	65
13	Katsiaryna Barazna	Belarus	66
14	Simona Frapporti	Italy	74
15	Hanna Solovey	Ukraine	75
16	Alžbeta Pavlendová	Slovakia	84
17	Sakura Tsukagoshi	Japan	88
