= 2019 UEC European Track Championships – Women's team pursuit =

Pursuit Competition Of Women

Women's team pursuit at the 2019 UEC European Track Championships
- Venue: Omnisport Apeldoorn, Apeldoorn
- Date: 16–17 October
- Competitors: 49 from 11 nations
- Winning time: 4:13.828

Medalists
gold medal	Katie Archibald; Ellie Dickinson; Neah Evans; Laura Kenny; Elinor Barker	Great Britain
silver medal	Franziska Brauße; Lisa Brennauer; Lisa Klein; Gudrun Stock; Mieke Kröger	Germany
bronze medal	Elisa Balsamo; Martina Alzini; Vittoria Guazzini; Letizia Paternoster; Marta Cavalli	Italy

The women's team pursuit competition at the 2019 UEC European Track Championships was held on 16 and 17 October 2019.

== Results ==
=== Qualifying ===
The eight fastest teams advanced to the first round.

Rank	Name	Nation	Time	Behind	Notes
1	Katie Archibald; Ellie Dickinson; Neah Evans; Laura Kenny	Great Britain	4:15.939		Q
2	Franziska Brauße; Lisa Brennauer; Lisa Klein; Mieke Kröger	Germany	4:18.567	+2.628	Q
3	Elisa Balsamo; Marta Cavalli; Vittoria Guazzini; Letizia Paternoster	Italy	4:18.571	+2.632	Q
4	Marion Borras; Clara Copponi; Coralie Demay; Valentine Fortin	France	4:22.669	+6.730	Q
5	Shari Bossuyt; Jolien D'Hoore; Annelies Dom; Lotte Kopecky	Belgium	4:25.730	+9.791	q
6	Karolina Karasiewicz; Łucja Pietrzak; Daria Pikulik; Nikol Płosaj	Poland	4:28.824	+12.885	q
7	Polina Pivovarova; Aksana Salauyeva; Ina Savenka; Karalina Savenka	Belarus	4:30.473	+14.534	q
8	Mylène de Zoete; Amber van der Hulst; Kirstie van Haaften; Bente van Teeseling	Netherlands	4:30.776	+14.837	q
9	Mia Griffin; Kelly Murphy; Alice Sharpe; Orla Walsh	Ireland	4:31.325	+15.386	
10	Tamara Dronova; Diana Klimova; Daria Malkova; Maria Rostovtseva	Russia	4:32.713	+16.774	
11	Oksana Kliachina; Anna Nahirna; Hanna Solovey; Kseniia Fedotova	Ukraine	4:35.484	+19.545	

=== First round ===
First round heats were held as follows:
Heat 1: 6th v 7th fastest
Heat 2: 5th v 8th fastest
Heat 3: 2nd v 3rd fastest
Heat 4: 1st v 4th fastest

The winners of heats 3 and 4 proceeded to the gold medal race. The remaining six teams were ranked on time, from which the top two proceeded to the bronze medal race.

Rank	Heat	Name	Nation	Time	Notes
1	3	Franziska Brauße; Lisa Brennauer; Lisa Klein; Gudrun Stock	Germany	4:16.328	QG
2	4	Katie Archibald; Ellie Dickinson; Neah Evans; Elinor Barker	Great Britain	4:17.352	QG
3	3	Elisa Balsamo; Marta Cavalli; Vittoria Guazzini; Letizia Paternoster	Italy	4:17.887	QB
4	4	Marion Borras; Clara Copponi; Coralie Demay; Marie Le Net	France	4:21.174	QB
5	2	Shari Bossuyt; Jolien D'Hoore; Annelies Dom; Lotte Kopecky	Belgium	4:21.933	
6	1	Karolina Karasiewicz; Justyna Kaczkowska; Daria Pikulik; Nikol Płosaj	Poland	4:23.600	
7	2	Mylène de Zoete; Amber van der Hulst; Kirstie van Haaften; Bente van Teeseling	Netherlands	4:31.634	
8	1	Polina Pivovarova; Aksana Salauyeva; Ina Savenka; Karalina Savenka	Belarus	4:31.730	

=== Finals ===
Rank	Name	Nation	Time	Behind	Notes
Gold medal final
1st place, gold medalist(s)	Katie Archibald; Ellie Dickinson; Neah Evans; Laura Kenny	Great Britain	4:13.828		
2nd place, silver medalist(s)	Franziska Brauße; Lisa Brennauer; Lisa Klein; Gudrun Stock	Germany	4:16.789	+2.961	
Bronze medal final
3rd place, bronze medalist(s)	Elisa Balsamo; Martina Alzini; Vittoria Guazzini; Letizia Paternoster	Italy	4:17.610		
4	Valentine Fortin; Clara Copponi; Coralie Demay; Marie Le Net	France	4:22.118	+4.508	
