= 2015 UEC European Track Championships – Women's scratch =

Women's scratch race at the 2015 UEC European Track Championships
- UEC European Champion jersey
- Venue: Velodrome Suisse, Grenchen
- Date: 16 October
- Competitors: 18 from 18 nations

Medalists
gold medal	Laura Trott	Great Britain
silver medal	Kirsten Wild	Netherlands
bronze medal	Roxane Fournier	France

The Women's scratch was held on 16 October 2015.

== Results ==
Rank	Name	Nation	Laps down
1st place, gold medalist(s)	Laura Trott	Great Britain	
2nd place, silver medalist(s)	Kirsten Wild	Netherlands	
3rd place, bronze medalist(s)	Roxane Fournier	France	
4	Katarzyna Pawłowska	Poland	
5	Aleksandra Goncharova	Russia	
6	Maria Giulia Confalonieri	Italy	
7	Maryna Shmayankova	Belarus	
8	Irene Usabiaga	Spain	
9	Tetyana Klimchenko	Ukraine	
10	Anita Stenberg	Norway	
11	Doris Schweizer	Switzerland	
12	Kaat Van der Meulen	Belgium	
13	Jarmila Machačová	Czech Republic	
14	Alžbeta Pavlendová	Slovakia	
15	Charlotte Becker	Germany	
—	Sara Ferrara	Finland	DNF
—	Shannon McCurley	Ireland	DNF
—	Vaida Pikauskaitė	Lithuania	DNF
