= Laura Kenny =

English cyclist (born 1992)

Dame Laura Kenny DBE
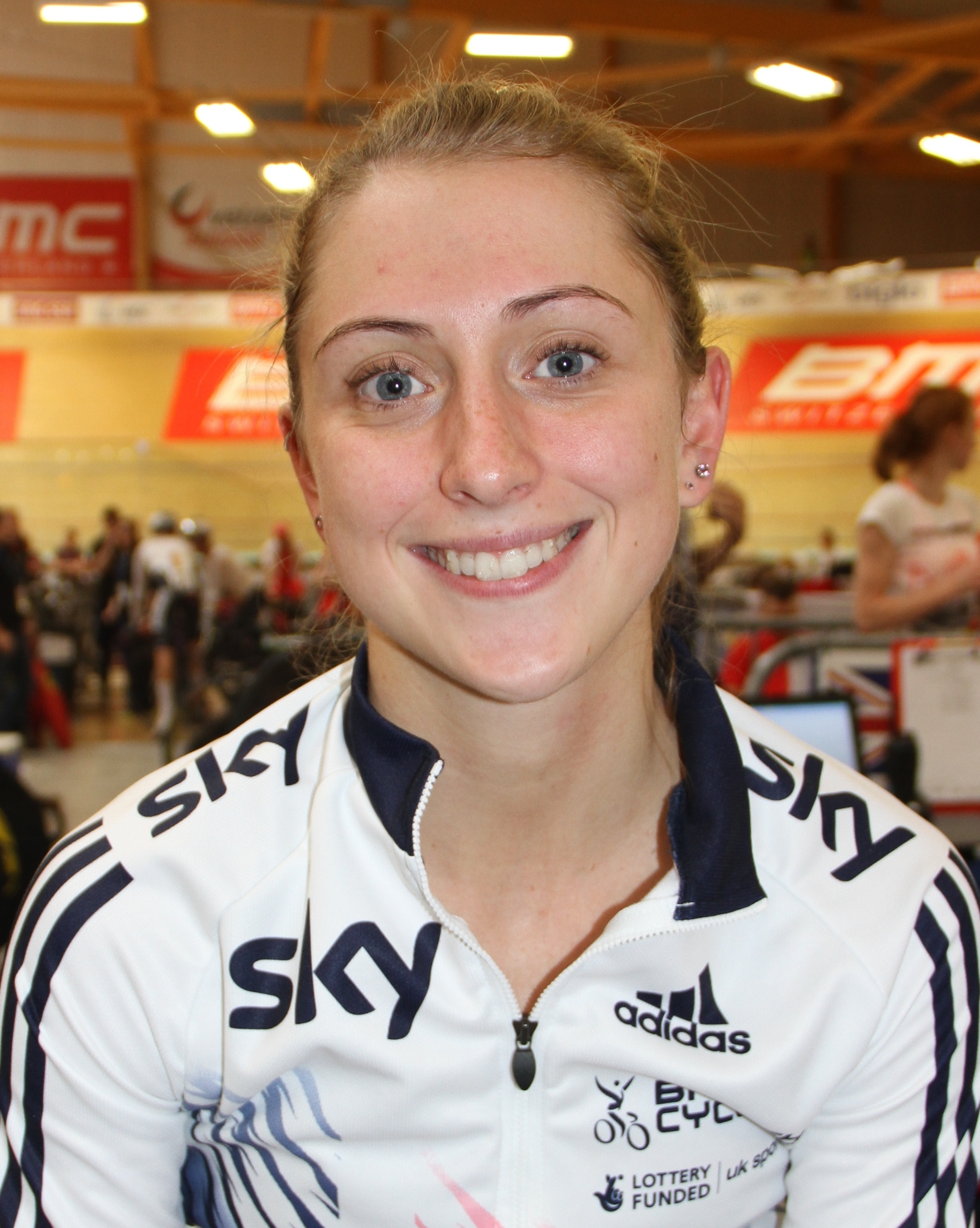
- Kenny (then Trott) at the 2015 UEC European Track Championships

Personal information
- Full name: Laura Rebecca Kenny
- Born: Laura Rebecca Trott; 24 April 1992 (age 34) Harlow, Essex, England
- Height: 163 cm (5 ft 4 in)
- Weight: 52 kg (115 lb)

Cycling career
- Sport: Cycling
- Disciplines: Track; Road
- Role: Rider
- Rider type: Endurance (track)

Professional teams
- 2012: Team Ibis Cycles
- 2013–2014: Wiggle–Honda
- 2015–2018: Matrix Fitness Pro Cycling
- 2022: Team Breeze
Medal record
Event	1st	2nd	3rd
Olympic Games	5	1	0
World Championships	7	7	1
European Championships	14	3	1
Commonwealth Games	2	0	1
European U23 Championships	6	0	0
Total	34	11	3
Women's track cycling
Representing Great Britain
Olympic Games
Gold medal – first place	2012 London	Omnium
Gold medal – first place	2012 London	Team pursuit
Gold medal – first place	2016 Rio de Janeiro	Omnium
Gold medal – first place	2016 Rio de Janeiro	Team pursuit
Gold medal – first place	2020 Tokyo	Madison
Silver medal – second place	2020 Tokyo	Team pursuit
World Championships
Gold medal – first place	2011 Apeldoorn	Team pursuit
Gold medal – first place	2012 Melbourne	Omnium
Gold medal – first place	2012 Melbourne	Team pursuit
Gold medal – first place	2013 Minsk	Team pursuit
Gold medal – first place	2014 Cali	Team pursuit
Gold medal – first place	2016 London	Scratch
Gold medal – first place	2016 London	Omnium
Silver medal – second place	2013 Minsk	Omnium
Silver medal – second place	2014 Cali	Omnium
Silver medal – second place	2015 Saint-Quentin-en-Yvelines	Omnium
Silver medal – second place	2015 Saint-Quentin-en-Yvelines	Team pursuit
Silver medal – second place	2018 Apeldoorn	Team pursuit
Silver medal – second place	2019 Pruszków	Team pursuit
Silver medal – second place	2020 Berlin	Team pursuit
Bronze medal – third place	2016 London	Team pursuit
European Championships
Gold medal – first place	2010 Pruszków	Team pursuit
Gold medal – first place	2011 Apeldoorn	Omnium
Gold medal – first place	2011 Apeldoorn	Team pursuit
Gold medal – first place	2013 Apeldoorn	Omnium
Gold medal – first place	2013 Apeldoorn	Team pursuit
Gold medal – first place	2014 Guadeloupe	Omnium
Gold medal – first place	2014 Guadeloupe	Team pursuit
Gold medal – first place	2015 Grenchen	Scratch race
Gold medal – first place	2015 Grenchen	Omnium
Gold medal – first place	2015 Grenchen	Team pursuit
Gold medal – first place	2018 Glasgow	Elimination race
Gold medal – first place	2018 Glasgow	Team pursuit
Gold medal – first place	2019 Apeldoorn	Team pursuit
Gold medal – first place	2020 Plovdiv	Team pursuit
Silver medal – second place	2019 Apeldoorn	Omnium
Silver medal – second place	2019 Apeldoorn	Madison
Silver medal – second place	2020 Plovdiv	Omnium
Bronze medal – third place	2020 Plovdiv	Madison
Junior World Championships
Gold medal – first place	2010 Montichiari	Omnium
Silver medal – second place	2010 Montichiari	Pursuit
Silver medal – second place	2010 Montichiari	Points race
U23 & Junior European Championships
Gold medal – first place	2011 Anadia	U23 Scratch race
Gold medal – first place	2011 Anadia	U23 Individual pursuit
Gold medal – first place	2011 Anadia	U23 Team pursuit
Gold medal – first place	2013 Anadia	U23 Individual pursuit
Gold medal – first place	2013 Anadia	U23 Points race
Gold medal – first place	2013 Anadia	U23 Omnium
Representing England
Commonwealth Games
Gold medal – first place	2014 Glasgow	Points race
Gold medal – first place	2022 Birmingham	Scratch race
Bronze medal – third place	2022 Birmingham	Team pursuit

Dame Laura Rebecca Kenny, Lady Kenny, (née Trott; born 24 April 1992) is an English former professional track and road cyclist who specialised in track endurance events. These included the team pursuit, omnium, scratch race, and madison disciplines. She won six Olympic medals during her career—five golds and one silver. Her five Olympic gold medals are an all-time record for a British female Olympian, and her overall tally of six medals is a joint-record alongside Charlotte Dujardin.

Kenny became a European champion for the first time in 2010, and world champion for the first time in 2011. At the 2012 Summer Olympics in London, she won gold medals in both the team pursuit and the omnium. Kenny won further world titles in 2013, 2014 and 2016 before successfully defending her Olympic titles in both the team pursuit and the omnium at the 2016 Summer Olympics. Kenny became a mother in 2017, but returned in 2018, securing two gold medals in the European Championships later that year. Further European titles followed and she won her fifth Olympic gold (an all-time record for a female cyclist) in the madison at the delayed 2020 games in Tokyo, as well as securing a silver in the team pursuit. Kenny gave birth again in 2023, and she retired from cycling four months before the 2024 Summer Olympics.

During her track cycling career, she won five Olympic, seven World Championship, fourteen European Championship and two Commonwealth Games titles. Kenny predominantly focused on track cycling during her career. Her best result in road racing was victory in the British National Road Race Championships in 2014. In 2016, she married fellow cyclist Jason Kenny, and between them they have won fifteen Olympic medals, including twelve golds, a record for married Olympic gold medallists. She was appointed Dame Commander of the Order of the British Empire (DBE) in the 2022 New Year Honours and is a member of the British Cycling Hall of Fame.

== Early life ==
Kenny was born a month prematurely, and with a collapsed lung in Harlow, Essex. She was later diagnosed with asthma, and was advised by doctors to take up sport in order to help control her breathing. She took part in trampolining but had to give up as she kept passing out while jumping. She grew up in Cheshunt, where she attended Turnford School, and her older sister Emma Trott also became a road racing cyclist. The sisters began cycling when they rode with their mother who had taken up cycling to help lose weight. At around the age of nine, she joined a local cycling club called the Welwyn Wheelers.

== Career ==
=== 2008–2012 ===
Kenny won the British girls under-16 scratch race title at the 2008 National Junior and Youth Track Championships as well as finishing second in the under-16 sprint. She also secured a sprint bronze in the junior category. The following year, she claimed the junior women's pursuit title at the 2009 British National Track Championships, as well as finishing second in the scratch race. On the road that year, she was victorious in the Essex Giro and thus secured the title of British women's Junior Road Race champion.

In 2010 she finished fourth in the 2010 World Junior Road Race Championships and then competed at the World Junior Track Championships, where she won gold in the omnium and silver medals in the individual pursuit and points race. At national-level, Kenny won the individual pursuit, points race and the 500 m time trial at the 2010 British National Junior Track Championships. She was then selected to compete for England at senior-level in the 2010 Commonwealth Games in Delhi, where she finished seventh in the individual pursuit. She was then selected for the British Olympic Academy Programme. At the 2010 European Championships in Pruszków, she won her first senior-level gold medal. Racing with teammates Katie Colclough and Wendy Houvenaghel, the trio finished first in the team pursuit, overcoming Lithuania in the final.

Kenny won her first world title at the 2011 World Track Cycling Championships in Apeldoorn, as part of the team pursuit line-up with Dani Rowe and Houvenaghel. Great Britain secured victory over the United States in the gold medal race. She then secured three gold medals at the under-23 European Track Championships in Anadia, triumphing in the scratch race, individual pursuit and team pursuit. In October, returning to senior competition at the European Track Championships, she finished in first place in both the team pursuit and the omnium. Later in the year, at the 2011–12 Track Cycling World Cup event in Cali, Kenny finished with a gold medal in the team pursuit and a bronze medal in the omnium.

For the 2012 road season, Kenny joined Team Ibis Cycles, with whom she competed in five races, but recorded no podium finishes. Back on the track, she enjoyed success in the run up to the 2012 Summer Olympics, winning two world titles at the World Track Cycling Championships in Melbourne. In the team pursuit, Great Britain (Kenny, Joanna Rowsell and Rowe) twice broke the world record, setting a fastest time of 3:15.720 in the final. She followed this up with victory in the omnium.

Kenny at the 'Our Greatest Team Parade' celebration after the 2012 Summer Olympics

At the Summer Olympics in London, Kenny won a gold medal in the team pursuit with Rowe and Rowsell. In their victory against the United States in the gold-medal race, Great Britain set a new world and Olympic record time of 3:14.051 for the event. Including pre-Olympics races and the Olympics final itself, in the six times they had ridden together the trio had broken the world record in every race. She also won gold in the omnium, two days after winning gold in the team pursuit.

=== 2013–2016 ===
Kenny joined the Wiggle Honda team in 2013 and in her first start for the team, she finished fourth at the GP Dottignies in Belgium. She also recorded a second-place finish at the British National Road Race Championships, which secured her the British under-23 title.

In 2013, Kenny won a world title in the team pursuit at the Track Cycling World Championships in Minsk, as well as finishing in second place in the omnium. In July, she was crowned the champion in both the individual pursuit and the points race at the 2013 Junior/U23 European Track Championships, beating her British teammate Elinor Barker to gold in both disciplines. In September, Kenny won four national titles, triumphing in the team pursuit, pursuit, points race and the madison. She then won gold medals in both the team pursuit and the omnium at the European Track Championships in Apeldoorn. Great Britain, featuring Kenny, King, Rowsell and Barker also set a new world record time of 4:26.556 during their victory in the team pursuit. In the 2013–14 Track Cycling World Cup, Kenny was part of the same British quartet who again broke the team pursuit world record, this time in Manchester, setting a time of 4:19.604. She also went on to claim the omnium title in Manchester, before claiming silver in the omnium at the next leg of the series in Aguascalientes.

Kenny won gold in the team pursuit at the 2014 Track Cycling World Championships, and she later collected a silver in the omnium. She then competed for England at the 2014 Commonwealth Games in Glasgow. At the start of the competition, she was still suffering from a kidney infection and she finished out of the medal places in both the scratch race and the individual pursuit. Kenny recovered as the Games progressed, and she claimed a gold medal after triumphing in the points race. She was victorious at the national road championships, finishing ahead of King and Lizzie Armitstead, and she stated afterwards that her win was "up there with winning a world championships." Returning to the track, Kenny won gold in both the team pursuit and the omnium at the European Track Championships in Guadeloupe. In the 2014–15 Track Cycling World Cup, Kenny was part of the British quartet that triumphed in the team pursuit at the events in Guadalajara and London. Additionally, she claimed gold in the omnium in London.

In February 2015, Kenny failed to win a title at the World Championships for the first time in her career, finishing second in both the team pursuit and the omnium. The result was part of a disappointing Championships for Great Britain, with the team finishing without a gold for the first time since 2001. She signed as a lead rider for the Matrix Fitness Vulpine team for her road racing that year, moving to the team in order to better combine her road and track cycling aspirations. After a road season in which her best result was third in the National Championships, Kenny returned to track cycling and won three gold medals at the European Track Championships, in the team pursuit, scratch race and the omnium. Kenny also claimed gold in the omnium at the 2015–16 Track Cycling World Cup event in Cali, winning the event by fifty-three points.

At the beginning of 2016, Kenny won gold in the omnium and a silver in the scratch race at the Track Cycling World Cup event in Hong Kong. She followed this with gold medals in the scratch race and the omnium at the 2016 World Championships in London, as well as a bronze in the team pursuit.

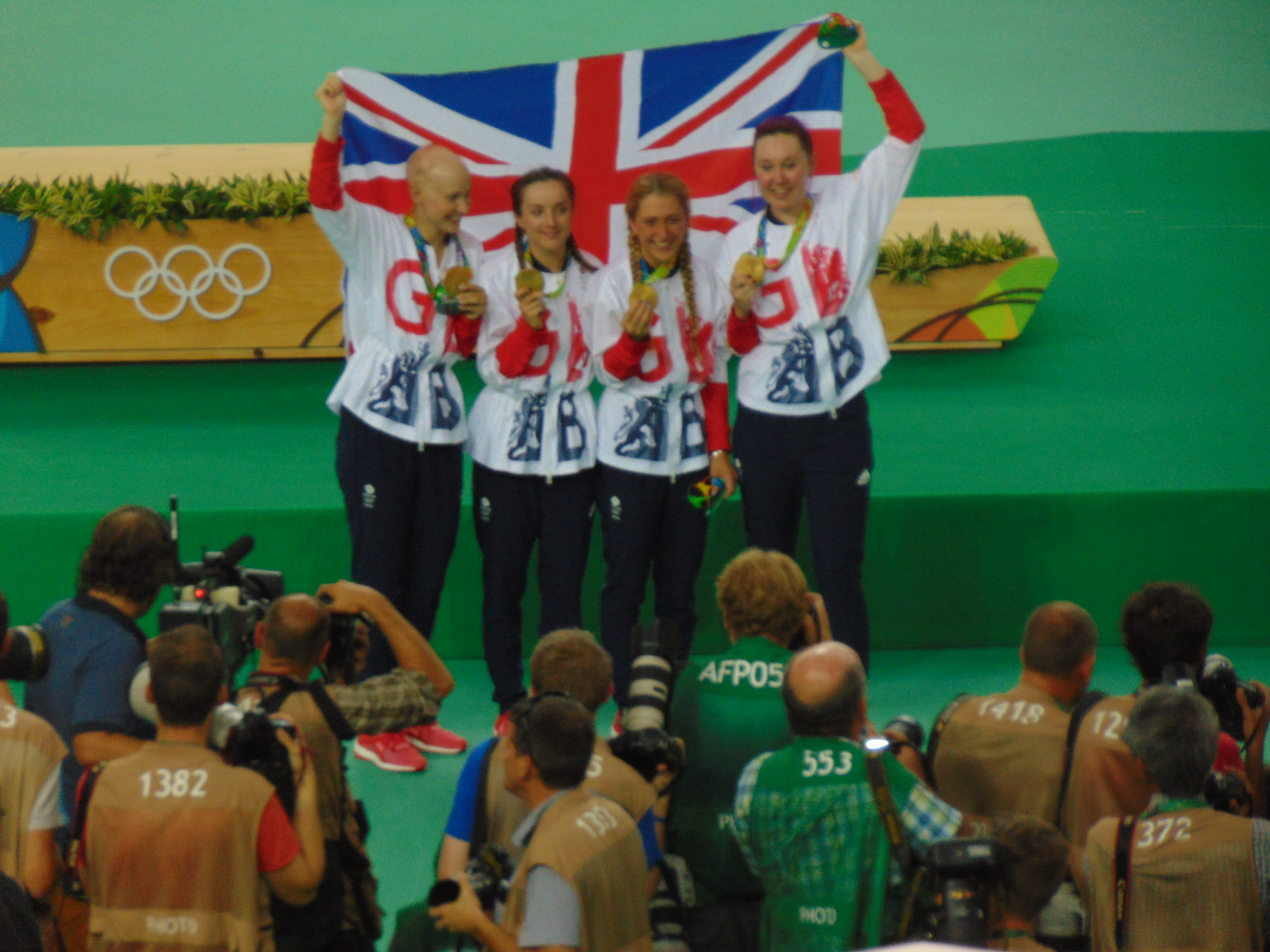
Kenny (second from right) after winning team pursuit gold at the 2016 Olympics

At the 2016 Olympics in Rio de Janeiro, Kenny competed for medals in both the team pursuit and the omnium. In the team pursuit, Great Britain, featuring Kenny, Barker, Rowsell and Katie Archibald took gold, defeating the American world champions in the final with a world record time of 4:10.236. This made Kenny the first British woman to win three golds, though this achievement was matched by Charlotte Dujardin the next day. In the Omnium, Kenny finished in the top two in five of the six events, to secure her second gold medal of the games and again become Britain's leading female Olympian in terms of gold medals won. Following the end of the track cycling competition at the games, she and her fiancé Jason Kenny were described in the British press as the 'golden couple', having won five gold medals between them at the 2016 games. At the end of the year, she was a nominee for the 2016 BBC Sports Personality of the Year Award, and she was also awarded Sunday Times Sportswoman of the Year.

=== 2017–2024 ===
After giving birth in August 2017, Kenny returned to training in January 2018. In March she was part of the team pursuit line-up that finished in silver position at the World Track Cycling Championships in Apeldoorn. The following August, at the European Track Championships in Glasgow, Kenny won gold medals in both the team pursuit and the elimination race. She then won six gold medals later in the year in the 2018‍–‍19 Track Cycling World Cup series. In Milton, she triumphed in both the team pursuit and omnium, before winning the team pursuit and madison (with Emily Nelson) in Berlin. Kenny took part in the madison as a replacement after Archibald had crashed in an earlier event. Kenny then added two further golds in London, one as part of the team pursuit, and another in the madison alongside Archibald.

Kenny won a bronze medal in the team pursuit at the 2019 Track Cycling World Championships in Pruszków. She was scheduled to compete in the omnium later on, but was forced to withdraw due to an illness.

Madison partners Kenny and Archibald at the 2019 European Track Championships

At the European Track Championships, she claimed her 13th career European gold medal with victory in the team pursuit, as well as securing silver medals in both the omnium and the madison. In November, Kenny took part in the Track Cycling World Cup meeting in Minsk. She finished runner-up in the madison (with Nelson) and she also finished third in the omnium.

In January 2020, Kenny broke her shoulder during a crash in the omnium at the Track Cycling World Cup event in Milton. Earlier in the event, she and Neah Evans won gold in the madison. She decided not to have surgery in order to compete at the following month's World Track Cycling Championships. A surgeon had told her that surgery would probably prevent her from competing in the scheduled Olympics that summer. At the World Championships in Berlin, she won a silver medal as a member of the British squad that finished second in the team pursuit. Kenny competed in a heat but didn't take part in the final. She then finished twelfth in the omnium. The Olympics were then postponed due to the COVID-19 pandemic. In November, Kenny won three medals at the European Track Championships in Plovdiv. She claimed a gold medal in the team pursuit, a silver in the omnium and a bronze in the madison (with Barker).

At the delayed 2020 Tokyo Olympics, Kenny won a silver medal in the team pursuit. Great Britain had briefly held the world record (4:06.748) after their ride in the first round, before Germany set a faster time in their heat. Germany broke the world record again in the final, finishing six seconds ahead of the British team, featuring Kenny, Archibald, Evans and Josie Knight. Kenny and Archibald then became the first ever Olympic champions in the women's madison, winning 10 of the race's 12 sprints and gaining a lap on the field to secure a total of 78 points, more than twice the score of the second-placed Danish team. After their success, Kenny said: "I have never wanted to win a race so badly in my life."

Victory made Kenny the first British woman to win gold medals at three consecutive Olympics, the female cyclist with the most gold medals in Olympic history (ahead of Leontien van Moorsel), and tied with Dujardin for the most Olympic medals won by a British woman (with six). She also became the first British woman to win five Olympic gold medals during her career. Kenny then competed in the omnium, chasing a third medal of the games, but her hopes suffered a setback in the opening scratch race when she was involved in a multi-rider crash on the penultimate lap. She went on to win the tempo race but could only finish 13th in the elimination race, finishing sixth in the overall standings. Kenny was chosen to be the flag bearer for Great Britain at the closing ceremony.

In April 2022, Kenny teamed up with Evans to win the British National Madison Championships. Later that month, she was part of the British team that finished second in the team pursuit at the Track Nations Cup in Glasgow. At the Commonwealth Games in Birmingham, she secured her first gold medal in the competition since 2014 with success in the scratch race. It was her second medal of the games, after also winning a bronze medal in the team pursuit. She also finished 13th in the points race and said that prior to her gold medal earlier in the Games she had told her husband that it might be her final race. The year had seen her suffer personal loss in her private life with Kenny stating that she had "lost her spark" and motivation to train.

In July 2023, Kenny became a mother for the second time and indicated in November that it was still her ambition to compete at the 2024 Summer Olympics. However, in early March 2024, she had not returned to training, and the performance director of British Cycling, Stephen Park, cast doubt on her participation. On 18 March 2024 (four months before the Olympics), she announced her retirement from cycling. She ended her career with five Olympic gold medals and one silver, her five gold medals being an all-time record for a female British Olympian.

== Post-retirement ==
Kenny joined the BBC's coverage of the 2024 Summer Olympics. Later in the year, she was the ambassador for the Unsung Hero Award at the BBC Sports Personality of the year Awards.

Kenny was named Commonwealth Games England president in March 2025, becoming the youngest person to hold the role. In 2026, she appeared as a contestant on House of Games.

== Personal life ==
She married fellow track cyclist Jason Kenny on 24 September 2016 at a private ceremony in Macclesfield. Fellow Olympic gold medallist and teammate Dani Rowe (née King) was one of the bridesmaids. In 2016, the couple lived near Knutsford in Cheshire, and their first son was born in August 2017. In November 2021, she suffered a miscarriage at nine weeks, and in January 2022, she underwent surgery due to an ectopic pregnancy. Their second son was born in July 2023. In December 2024, another pregnancy was announced, and she gave birth to a daughter in May 2025. As a married couple, they share a record 15 Olympic medals, where both spouses are Olympic gold medalists. She is a supporter of Premier League football club Tottenham Hotspur, and ran the London Marathon in April 2026.

== Honours and awards ==
Kenny was appointed an OBE in the 2013 New Year Honours, and was later made a CBE in the 2017 New Year Honours, for services to cycling. Both she, and her husband received their CBE insignia on 25 April 2017 at an investiture in Buckingham Palace. She was appointed Dame Commander of the Order of the British Empire (DBE) in the 2022 New Year Honours, again for services to cycling. Her husband was knighted in the same list, also for services to cycling. They were both invested at Windsor Castle on 17 May 2022.

The Royal Mail promised to paint a postbox gold in the hometown of every British gold medallist at the 2012 Summer Olympics, but they wrongly painted a postbox in Harlow, where she was born, instead of Cheshunt which she considers her home town. A second postbox was then painted gold to rectify the mistake. Kenny also featured on a commemorative stamp released by the Royal Mail in 2012, which featured her with her Olympic team pursuit winning teammates.

In 2012, she was given the freedom of the borough of Broxbourne, and in 2013, she was awarded an Honorary Degree from the University of Essex. In 2014, the Grundy Park Leisure Centre in Cheshunt was renamed The Laura Trott Leisure Centre in recognition of her achievements.

In 2024, Kenny was inducted into the British Cycling Hall of Fame. In 2025, she was named UK Sportswoman of the 21st Century in a poll held by BBC 5 Live Breakfast.

== Career achievements ==
=== Major results ===
==== Track ====
2008
British National Junior and Youth Track Championships

1st Under-16 Girls Scratch
2nd Under-16 Girls Sprint
3rd Junior Sprint

2009
British National Junior and Youth Track Championships

1st Junior Individual pursuit
2nd Junior Points race
2nd Junior 500 m time trial
2nd Junior Scratch

British National Track Championships

3rd Madison (with Hannah Mayho)

2010
1st Team pursuit, UEC European Track Championships
British National Junior and Youth Track Championships

1st Junior Individual pursuit
1st Junior 500 m time trial
1st Junior Points race

1st British National Derny Championships
British National Track Championships

3rd Madison (with Harriet Owen)
3rd Individual pursuit

2011
1st Team pursuit, UCI Track World Championships
UEC European Track Championships

1st Team pursuit
1st Omnium

UEC European Under-23 Track Championships

1st Individual pursuit
1st Scratch
1st Team pursuit

2011–12 UCI Track Cycling World Cup, Cali

1st Team pursuit
3rd Omnium

British National Track Championships

2nd Individual pursuit
2nd Points race
2nd Scratch
3rd 500 m time trial

2012
Olympic Games

1st Team pursuit
1st Omnium

UCI Track World Championships

1st Team pursuit
1st Omnium

UEC European Track Championships

1st Team Pursuit
1st Omnium

2011–12 UCI Track Cycling World Cup, London

1st Team pursuit
3rd Omnium

2012–13 UCI Track Cycling World Cup, Glasgow

1st Omnium
1st Team pursuit

2013
UCI Track World Championships

1st Team pursuit
2nd Omnium

UEC European Track Championships

1st Team pursuit
1st Omnium

UEC European Under-23 Track Championships

1st Individual pursuit
1st Points race

British National Track Championships

1st Team pursuit
1st Points race
1st Individual pursuit
1st Madison (with Dani King)

2013–14 UCI Track Cycling World Cup

1st Team pursuit, Manchester
1st Omnium, Manchester
2nd Omnium, Aguascalientes

2014
UCI Track World Championships

1st Team pursuit
2nd Omnium

UEC European Track Championships

1st Team pursuit
1st Omnium

1st Points race, Commonwealth Games
British National Track Championships

1st Team pursuit
1st Scratch
2nd Individual pursuit
3rd Points race

2014–15 UCI Track Cycling World Cup

1st Team pursuit, Guadalajara
1st Team pursuit, London
1st Omnium, London

2015
1st Omnium, 2015–16 UCI Track Cycling World Cup, Cali
UEC European Track Championships

1st Team pursuit
1st Scratch
1st Omnium

British National Track Championships

1st Individual pursuit
1st Scratch
1st Points race

Grand Prix of Poland

1st Omnium
1st Scratch

UCI Track World Championships

2nd Team pursuit
2nd Omnium

2016
Olympic Games

1st Team pursuit
1st Omnium

UCI Track World Championships

1st Omnium
1st Scratch
3rd Team pursuit

2015–16 UCI Track Cycling World Cup, Hong Kong

1st Omnium
2nd Scratch

1st British National Madison Championships (with Elinor Barker)
2018
2nd Team pursuit, UCI World Championships
UEC European Track Championships

1st Team pursuit
1st Elimination race

2018–19 UCI Track Cycling World Cup

1st Omnium, Milton
1st Team pursuit, Milton
1st Madison, Berlin (with Emily Nelson)
1st Team pursuit, Berlin
1st Madison, London (with Katie Archibald)
1st Team pursuit, London

British National Track Championships

1st Omnium
2nd Madison (with Ellie Dickinson)

2019
2nd Team pursuit, UCI World Championships
2019–20 UCI Track Cycling World Cup, Minsk

2nd Madison (with Emily Nelson)
3rd Omnium

UEC European Track Championships

1st Team pursuit
2nd Omnium
2nd Madison (with Katie Archibald)

2020
2nd Team pursuit, UCI World Championships
1st Madison, 2019–20 UCI Track Cycling World Cup, Milton (with Neah Evans)
UEC European Track Championships

1st Team pursuit
2nd Omnium
3rd Madison (with Elinor Barker)

2021
Olympic Games

1st Madison (with Katie Archibald)
2nd Team pursuit

2022
1st Madison, British National Track Championships (with Neah Evans)
2nd Team pursuit, UCI Track Cycling Nations Cup, Glasgow
Commonwealth Games

1st Scratch
3rd Team pursuit

==== Road ====
2009
2nd National Criterium Championships
2011
National Road Championships

1st Under-23 road race
5th Road race

2013
National Road Championships

1st Under-23 road race
2nd Road race
5th Time trial

1st RideLondon Grand Prix
4th Grand Prix de Dottignies
2014
National Road Championships

1st Road race
1st Under-23 road race
5th Time trial

1st Overall Surf & Turf 2-Day

1st Stages 1, 2 & 3

2015
3rd Road race, National Road Championships

== See also ==
- List of multiple Olympic gold medalists
- List of Olympic medalists in cycling (women)
- 2012 Olympics gold post boxes in the United Kingdom
- List of British cyclists
- Jason Kenny
