= 2020 UEC European Track Championships – Women's madison =

Women's madison at the 2020 UEC European Track Championships
- Venue: Kolodruma, Plovdiv
- Date: 15 November
- Competitors: 16 from 8 nations
- Winning points: 52

Medalists
gold medal	Elisa Balsamo; Vittoria Guazzini	Italy
silver medal	Diana Klimova; Maria Novolodskaya	Russia
bronze medal	Laura Kenny; Elinor Barker	Great Britain

The women's madison competition at the 2020 UEC European Track Championships was held on 15 November 2020.

== Results ==
120 laps (30 km) were raced with 12 sprints.

Rank	Name	Nation	Lap points	Sprint points	Finish order	Total points
1st place, gold medalist(s)	Elisa Balsamo; Vittoria Guazzini	Italy	0	52	1	52
2nd place, silver medalist(s)	Diana Klimova; Maria Novolodskaya	Russia	20	31	2	51
3rd place, bronze medalist(s)	Laura Kenny; Elinor Barker	Great Britain	0	38	3	38
4	Nikol Płosaj; Patrycja Lorkowska	Poland	0	13	4	13
5	Anna Nahirna; Viktoriya Bondar	Ukraine	0	5	5	5
6	Aline Seitz; Michelle Andres	Switzerland	0	4	6	4
7	Tania Calvo; Eukene Larrarte	Spain	0	0	7	0
8	Jarmila Machačová; Petra Ševčíková	Czech Republic	0	0	8	0
