= 2020 UCI Track Cycling World Championships – Women's team pursuit =

Women's team pursuit at the 2020 UCI Track Cycling World Championships
- Venue: Velodrom
- Location: Berlin, Germany
- Dates: 26–27 February
- Competitors: 50 from 12 nations
- Teams: 12
- Winning time: 4:11.235

Medalists
gold medal	Jennifer Valente; Chloé Dygert Owen; Emma White; Lily Williams	United States
silver medal	Elinor Barker; Katie Archibald; Ellie Dickinson; Neah Evans; Laura Kenny	Great Britain
bronze medal	Franziska Brauße; Lisa Brennauer; Lisa Klein; Gudrun Stock	Germany

The Women's team pursuit competition at the 2020 UCI Track Cycling World Championships was held on 26 and 27 February 2020.

== Results ==
=== Qualifying ===
The qualifying was started on 26 February at 13:00. The eight fastest teams advanced to the first round.

Rank	Nation	Time	Behind	Notes
1	United States; Jennifer Valente; Chloé Dygert Owen; Emma White; Lily Williams	4:11.229		Q
2	Great Britain; Elinor Barker; Katie Archibald; Ellie Dickinson; Neah Evans	4:11.871	+0.642	Q
3	Canada; Allison Beveridge; Jasmin Duehring; Annie Foreman-Mackey; Georgia Simmerling	4:12.728	+1.499	Q
4	New Zealand; Bryony Botha; Rushlee Buchanan; Kirstie James; Jaime Nielsen	4:14.383	+3.154	Q
5	Australia; Georgia Baker; Ashlee Ankudinoff; Annette Edmondson; Maeve Plouffe	4:14.934	+3.705	q
6	Italy; Letizia Paternoster; Martina Alzini; Elisa Balsamo; Silvia Valsecchi	4:15.255	+4.026	q
7	Germany; Franziska Brauße; Lisa Brennauer; Lisa Klein; Gudrun Stock	4:15.477	+4.248	q
8	Ireland; Alice Sharpe; Lara Gillespie; Mia Griffin; Kelly Murphy	4:21.368	+10.139	q
9	France; Clara Copponi; Coralie Demay; Valentine Fortin; Marie Le Net	4:21.417	+10.188	
10	Belgium; Jolien D'hoore; Lotte Kopecky; Shari Bossuyt; Gilke Croket	4:21.700	+10.471	
11	Poland; Daria Pikulik; Katarzyna Pawłowska; Łucja Pietrzak; Nikol Płosaj	4:26.380	+15.151	
12	Belarus; Polina Pivovarova; Aksana Salauyeva; Ina Savenka; Karalina Savenka	4:33.223	+21.994	

=== First round ===
The first round was held on 27 February at 18:30. First round heats were held as follows:
Heat 1: 6th v 7th fastest
Heat 2: 5th v 8th fastest
Heat 3: 2nd v 3rd fastest
Heat 4: 1st v 4th fastest

The winners of heats three and four proceeded to the gold medal race. The remaining six teams were ranked on time, from which the top two proceeded to the bronze medal race.

Rank	Heat	Nation	Time	Behind	Notes
1	1	Germany; Franziska Brauße; Lisa Brennauer; Lisa Klein; Gudrun Stock	4:11.039		QB
2	1	Italy; Letizia Paternoster; Martina Alzini; Elisa Balsamo; Silvia Valsecchi	4:18.338	+7.299	
1	2	Australia; Georgia Baker; Ashlee Ankudinoff; Annette Edmondson; Maeve Plouffe	4:13.454		
2	2	Ireland; Alice Sharpe; Lara Gillespie; Mia Griffin; Kelly Murphy	4:21.844	+8.390	
1	3	Great Britain; Laura Kenny; Elinor Barker; Katie Archibald; Ellie Dickinson	4:12.389		QG
2	3	Canada; Allison Beveridge; Jasmin Duehring; Annie Foreman-Mackey; Georgia Simmerling	4:12.627	+0.238	QB
1	4	United States; Jennifer Valente; Chloé Dygert; Emma White; Lily Williams	4:11.634		QG
2	4	New Zealand; Holly Edmondston; Bryony Botha; Rushlee Buchanan; Jaime Nielsen	4:13.883	+2.249	

- QG = qualified for gold medal final
- QB = qualified for bronze medal final

=== Finals ===
The finals were started on 27 February at 20:54.

Rank	Nation	Time	Behind	Notes
Gold medal race
1st place, gold medalist(s)	United States; Jennifer Valente; Chloé Dygert Owen; Emma White; Lily Williams	4:11.235		
2nd place, silver medalist(s)	Great Britain; Elinor Barker; Katie Archibald; Ellie Dickinson; Neah Evans	4:13.129	+1.894	
Bronze medal race
3rd place, bronze medalist(s)	Germany; Franziska Brauße; Lisa Brennauer; Lisa Klein; Gudrun Stock	4:12.964		
4	Canada; Allison Beveridge; Jasmin Duehring; Annie Foreman-Mackey; Georgia Simmerling	4:20.404	+7.440	
