= Maria Novolodskaya =

Russian cyclist (born 1999)

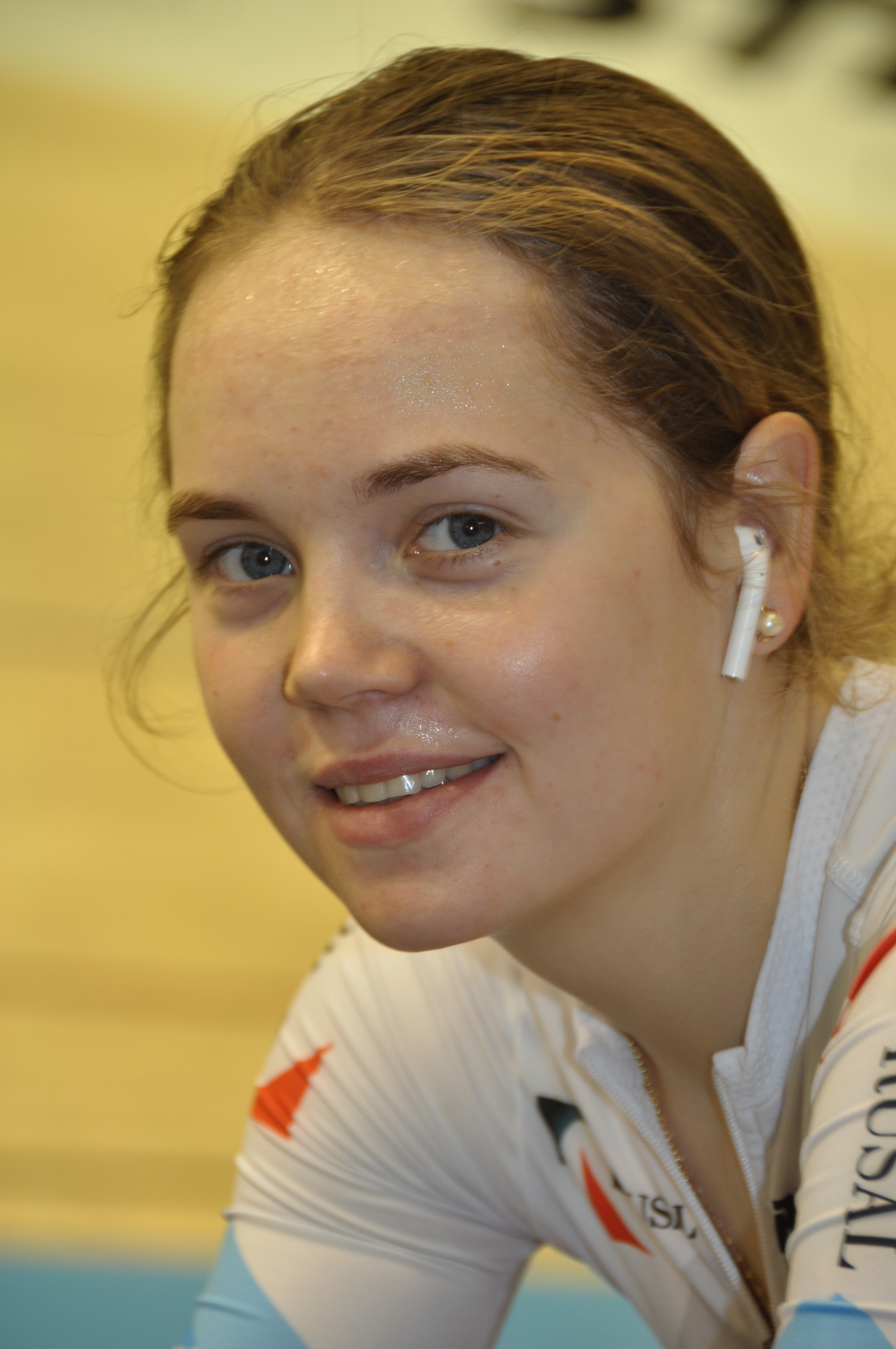
- Novolodskaya in 2018

Personal information
- Full name: Maria Yuryevna Novolodskaya
- Nickname: Masha
- Born: 28 July 1999 (age 27) Veliky Novgorod, Russia
- Height: 166 cm (5 ft 5 in)
- Weight: 57 kg (126 lb)

Cycling career
- Sport: Cycling
- Current team: Lifeplus Wahoo
- Disciplines: Road; Track
- Role: Rider

Professional teams
- 2018–2020: Cogeas
- 2021: A.R. Monex
- 2022: UAE Team ADQ
- 2023–: Lifeplus Wahoo
Medal record
Women's track cycling
Representing (Russia) ROC
Olympic Games
Bronze medal – third place	2020 Tokyo	Madison
Representing Russia
European Games
Bronze medal – third place	2019 Minsk	Madison
European Championships
Silver medal – second place	2020 Plovdiv	Madison
Bronze medal – third place	2020 Plovdiv	Omnium
Junior World Championships
Gold medal – first place	2016 Aigle	Individual pursuit
Silver medal – second place	2017 Montichiari	Madison
Silver medal – second place	2017 Montichiari	Points race
U23 & Junior European Championships
Gold medal – first place	2018 Aigle	U23 Madison
Gold medal – first place	2020 Fiorenzuola d'Arda	U23 Omnium
Silver medal – second place	2016 Montichiari	Junior Individual pursuit
Silver medal – second place	2017 Sangalhos	Junior Individual pursuit
Silver medal – second place	2017 Sangalhos	Junior Madison
Bronze medal – third place	2017 Sangalhos	Junior Team pursuit
Bronze medal – third place	2017 Sangalhos	Junior Omnium
Bronze medal – third place	2019 Ghent	U23 Madison
Bronze medal – third place	2019 Ghent	U23 Individual pursuit
Women's road cycling
European Championships
Silver medal – second place	2019 Alkmaar	U23 time trial

Maria Yuryevna Novolodskaya (Russian: Мария Юрьевна Новолодская, IPA: [mɐˈrʲijə ˈjʉrʲjɪvnə nəvɐˈlotskəjə]; born 28 July 1999) is a Russian track and road racing cyclist, who rides for UCI Women's Continental Team Lifeplus Wahoo from 2023.

== Career ==
She rode in the women's time trial event at the 2018 UCI Road World Championships and took the silver medal in the under-23 time trial at the 2019 European Road Championships.

== Personal life ==
Novolodskaya has 11 siblings, including eight brothers and three sisters. All of her siblings are cyclists, including her younger sister, Angelina Novolodskaya, who won a gold medal at the 2026 Summer Youth Olympics.

== Major results ==
2016
1st Individual Pursuit, UCI Junior Track Cycling World Championships
2nd Team Pursuit, European Junior Track Cycling Championships

2017
UCI Junior Track Cycling World Championships

2nd Madison
2nd Points Race

European Junior Track Cycling Championships

2nd Individual Pursuit
2nd Madison
3rd Omnium
3rd Team Pursuit

2018
1st European U23 Track Cycling Championships, Madison
2nd Overall Tour of Eftalia Hotels and Velo Alanya
National Track Cycling Championships

2nd Individual Pursuit
3rd Team Pursuit

3rd Overall Gracia–Orlová
3rd Time Trial, National Road Championships
3rd Madison, UCI Track Cycling World Cup – Minsk

2019
1st Individual Pursuit, National Track Cycling Championships
2nd Time Trial, European U23 Road Championships
2nd Gazipasa
3rd Overall Gracia–Orlová
European U23 Track Cycling Championships

3rd Individual Pursuit
3rd Madison

3rd Madison, European Games
3rd GP Alanya

2020
1st Omnium, European U23 Track Cycling Championships
1st Grand Prix Mount Erciyes 2200 mt
1st Grand Prix World's Best High Altitude
2nd Time Trial, National Road Championships
