= 2012 UCI Track Cycling World Championships – Women's omnium =

Rainbow jersey

The Women's omnium at the 2012 UCI Track Cycling World Championships was held on April 6–7. 24 athletes participated in the contest.

== Medalists ==
Gold	Laura Trott (GBR)
Silver	Annette Edmondson (AUS)
Bronze	Sarah Hammer (USA)

== Results ==
=== Flying Lap ===
The race was held at 16:35.

Rank	Name	Nation	Time	Notes
1	Annette Edmondson	Australia	14.377	
2	Laura Trott	Great Britain	14.391	
3	Huang Li	China	14.427	
4	Sarah Hammer	United States	14.433	
5	Leire Olaberria	Spain	14.543	
6	Tara Whitten	Canada	14.550	
7	Tatsiana Sharakova	Belarus	14.608	
8	Meng Zhao Juan	Hong Kong	14.649	
9	Aušrinė Trebaitė	Lithuania	14.715	
10	Jolien D'Hoore	Belgium	14.724	
11	Svitlana Halyuk	Ukraine	14.748	
12	Hsiao Mei Yu	Chinese Taipei	14.772	
13	Evgenia Romanyuta	Russia	14.774	
14	Małgorzata Wojtyra	Poland	14.883	
15	Lisa Brennauer	Germany	14.931	
16	Joanne Kiesanowski	New Zealand	14.940	
17	Pascale Jeuland	France	14.983	
18	Lee Min-Hye	South Korea	14.991	
19	Diana García	Colombia	15.030	
20	Angie González	Venezuela	15.050	
21	Sofía Arreola	Mexico	15.064	
22	Marlies Mejías	Cuba	15.148	
23	Kanako Kase	Japan	15.179	
24	Jarmila Machačová	Czech Republic	15.715	

=== Points Race ===
The race was held at 20:55.

Rank	Name	Nation	Points
1	Lisa Brennauer	Germany	23
2	Jarmila Machačová	Czech Republic	22
3	Angie González	Venezuela	21
4	Kanako Kase	Japan	20
5	Annette Edmondson	Australia	13
6	Małgorzata Wojtyra	Poland	10
7	Joanne Kiesanowski	New Zealand	10
8	Laura Trott	Great Britain	9
9	Sarah Hammer	United States	6
10	Evgenia Romanyuta	Russia	6
11	Svitlana Halyuk	Ukraine	5
12	Tara Whitten	Canada	5
13	Huang Li	China	5
14	Tatsiana Sharakova	Belarus	3
15	Leire Olaberria	Spain	2
16	Hsiao Mei Yu	Chinese Taipei	1
17	Pascale Jeuland	France	1
18	Sofía Arreola	Mexico	0
18	Lee Min-Hye	South Korea	0
20	Jolien D'Hoore	Belgium	0
21	Meng Zhao Juan	Hong Kong	0
22	Marlies Mejías	Cuba	0
23	Aušrinė Trebaitė	Lithuania	DNF
24	Diana García	Colombia	DNF

=== Elimination Race ===
The race was held at 22:45.

Rank	Name	Nation
1	Laura Trott	Great Britain
2	Evgenia Romanyuta	Russia
3	Małgorzata Wojtyra	Poland
4	Tara Whitten	Canada
5	Annette Edmondson	Australia
6	Joanne Kiesanowski	New Zealand
7	Sarah Hammer	United States
8	Hsiao Mei Yu	Chinese Taipei
9	Meng Zhao Juan	Hong Kong
10	Lisa Brennauer	Germany
11	Sofía Arreola	Mexico
12	Jolien D'Hoore	Belgium
13	Pascale Jeuland	France
14	Angie González	Venezuela
15	Tatsiana Sharakova	Belarus
16	Marlies Mejías	Cuba
17	Jarmila Machačová	Czech Republic
18	Huang Li	China
19	Lee Min-Hye	South Korea
20	Svitlana Halyuk	Ukraine
21	Leire Olaberria	Spain
22	Kanako Kase	Japan
23	Diana García	Colombia

=== Individual Pursuit ===
The race was held at 14:35.

Rank	Name	Nation	Time	Notes
1	Tara Whitten	Canada	3:30.011	
2	Sarah Hammer	United States	3:31.651	
3	Laura Trott	Great Britain	3:31.789	
4	Annette Edmondson	Australia	3:32.454	
5	Evgenia Romanyuta	Russia	3:36.049	
6	Tatsiana Sharakova	Belarus	3:37.528	
7	Svitlana Halyuk	Ukraine	3:38.111	
8	Huang Li	China	3:38.894	
9	Leire Olaberria	Spain	3:38.938	
10	Lisa Brennauer	Germany	3:40.621	
11	Jolien D'Hoore	Belgium	3:41.749	
12	Kanako Kase	Japan	3:42.145	
13	Pascale Jeuland	France	3:42.514	
14	Marlies Mejías	Cuba	3:42.593	
15	Małgorzata Wojtyra	Poland	3:43.073	
16	Joanne Kiesanowski	New Zealand	3:43.594	
17	Sofía Arreola	Mexico	3:43.882	
18	Angie González	Venezuela	3:48.501	
19	Hsiao Mei Yu	Chinese Taipei	3:48.701	
20	Lee Min-Hye	South Korea	3:49.255	
21	Jarmila Machačová	Czech Republic	3:49.534	
22	Meng Zhao Juan	Hong Kong	3:58.037	
23	Diana García	Colombia	4:07.710	

=== Scratch Race ===
The race was held at 19:10.

Rank	Name	Nation	Laps down
1	Leire Olaberria	Spain	
2	Jolien D'Hoore	Belgium	
3	Sofía Arreola	Mexico	
4	Huang Li	China	
5	Kanako Kase	Japan	
6	Hsiao Mei Yu	Chinese Taipei	
7	Marlies Mejías	Cuba	
8	Angie González	Venezuela	
9	Sarah Hammer	United States	
10	Joanne Kiesanowski	New Zealand	
11	Tara Whitten	Canada	
12	Evgenia Romanyuta	Russia	
13	Laura Trott	Great Britain	
14	Annette Edmondson	Australia	
15	Lisa Brennauer	Germany	
16	Svitlana Halyuk	Ukraine	
17	Meng Zhao Juan	Hong Kong	
18	Małgorzata Wojtyra	Poland	
19	Lee Min-Hye	South Korea	
20	Tatsiana Sharakova	Belarus	
21	Pascale Jeuland	France	
22	Jarmila Machačová	Czech Republic	
23	Diana García	Colombia	

=== 500m Time Trial ===
The race was held at 19:50.

Rank	Name	Nation	Time	Notes
1	Laura Trott	Great Britain	35.173	
2	Annette Edmondson	Australia	35.180	
3	Hsiao Mei Yu	Chinese Taipei	35.933	
4	Sarah Hammer	United States	36.171	
5	Marlies Mejías	Cuba	36.281	
6	Tara Whitten	Canada	36.291	
7	Joanne Kiesanowski	New Zealand	36.381	
8	Huang Li	China	36.387	
9	Tatsiana Sharakova	Belarus	36.395	
10	Jolien D'Hoore	Belgium	36.414	
11	Leire Olaberria	Spain	36.423	
12	Małgorzata Wojtyra	Poland	36.436	
13	Kanako Kase	Japan	36.516	
14	Diana García	Colombia	36.763	
15	Evgenia Romanyuta	Russia	36.857	
16	Angie González	Venezuela	36.885	
17	Lisa Brennauer	Germany	36.963	
18	Lee Min-Hye	South Korea	37.085	
19	Meng Zhao Juan	Hong Kong	37.098	
20	Svitlana Halyuk	Ukraine	37.694	
21	Sofía Arreola	Mexico	37.880	
22	Pascale Jeuland	France	38.837	
23	Jarmila Machačová	Czech Republic	39.367	

=== Standings ===
Final Results.

Rank	Name	Nation	Total
1	Laura Trott	Great Britain	28
2	Annette Edmondson	Australia	31
3	Sarah Hammer	United States	36
4	Tara Whitten	Canada	39
6	Huang Li	China	53
5	Evgenia Romanyuta	Russia	56
10	Joanne Kiesanowski	New Zealand	61
7	Leire Olaberria	Spain	62
9	Jolien D'Hoore	Belgium	63
12	Hsiao Mei Yu	Chinese Taipei	64
8	Lisa Brennauer	Germany	68
11	Małgorzata Wojtyra	Poland	69
14	Angie González	Venezuela	69
13	Tatsiana Sharakova	Belarus	71
15	Kanako Kase	Japan	79
19	Marlies Mejías	Cuba	84
16	Svitlana Halyuk	Ukraine	87
17	Sofía Arreola	Mexico	94
18	Meng Zhao Juan	Hong Kong	94
20	Pascale Jeuland	France	103
21	Jarmila Machačová	Czech Republic	109
22	Lee Min-Hye	South Korea	116
23	Diana García	Colombia	150
	Aušrinė Trebaitė	Lithuania	DNF
