= Cycling at the 2020 Summer Olympics – Women's Madison =

Olympic cycling event

Women's Madison at the Games of the XXXII Olympiad
- Olympic track cycling
- Venues: Izu Velodrome
- Date: 6 August 2021
- Competitors: 30 from 15 nations
- Teams: 15
- Winning points: 78

Medalists
1st place, gold medalist(s)		Katie Archibald; Laura Kenny	Great Britain
2nd place, silver medalist(s)		Amalie Dideriksen; Julie Leth	Denmark
3rd place, bronze medalist(s)		Gulnaz Khatuntseva; Maria Novolodskaya	ROC

The women's Madison event at the 2020 Summer Olympics took place on 6 August 2021 at the Izu Velodrome. 30 cyclists (15 teams of 2) from 15 nations competed.

== Background ==
This was the debut appearance of the women's event. The men's Madison was held from 2000 to 2008, then was dropped for 2012 and 2016 because there was no women's equivalent. The event returned in 2020 with a new women's counterpart.

The reigning (2020) world champions are Kirsten Wild and Amy Pieters of the Netherlands.

Russia, Germany, China, Great Britain, Australia, and the Netherlands are traditionally strong track cycling nations, while Belgium and France have strong pedigrees in Madison events.

== Qualification ==
A National Olympic Committee (NOC) could enter up to 1 team of 2 cyclists in the madison. Quota places are allocated to the NOC, which selects the cyclists. Qualification is entirely through the 2018–20 UCI nation rankings. The 8 top nations in the team pursuit rankings automatically qualified a team in the Madison. The best 8 NOCs in the madison rankings (not already qualified through the team pursuit) also qualified to enter madison teams. The NOCs qualifying directly in the madison also earned 1 spot in the omnium. Because qualification was complete by the end of the 2020 UCI Track Cycling World Championships on 1 March 2020 (the last event that contributed to the 2018–20 rankings), qualification was unaffected by the COVID-19 pandemic.

== Competition format ==
A madison race is a tag team points race that involves all 16 teams competing at once. One cyclist from each team competes at a time; the two team members can swap at any time by touching (including pushing and hand-slinging). The distance is 120 laps (30 km). Teams score points in two ways: lapping the field and sprints. A team that gains a lap on the field earns 20 points; one that loses a lap has 20 points deducted. Every 10th lap is a sprint, with the first to finish the lap earning 5 points, second 3 points, third 2 points, and fourth 1 point. The points values are doubled for the final sprint. There is only one round of competition.

== Schedule ==
All times are Japan Standard Time (UTC+9)

Date	Time	Round
6 August 2021	17:15	Final

== Results ==
The inaugural title was won in utterly dominant fashion by Great Britain's 'superteam' of Laura Kenny and Katie Archibald. Of 12 full sprints, Kenny and Archibald won ten, including the first three sprints in a row, six sprints in a row mid race, and the double points sprint to conclude the race; they scored points in all twelve sprints, and still found time and space to take a lap on the field. Of the theoretically available 65 sprint points, they took 58 - no other team took more than 21.

By winning the inaugural women's madison, Laura Kenny completed a hat-trick of inaugural wins, having won (and then defended) the inaugural women's team pursuit and omnium titles in 2012. She also became the first female cyclist, or female British Olympian, to claim five gold medals, making her Great Britain's most successful female Olympian, and the most successful Olympic female cyclist, in history. This mirrored the achievements of her husband Jason Kenny who took the male versions of both these achievements with gold in men's keirin.

Rank	Cyclist	Nation	Sprint												Laps		Finish order	Total
Rank	Cyclist	Nation	1	2	3	4	5	6	7	8	9	10	11	12	+	−	Finish order	Total
1st place, gold medalist(s)	Katie Archibald; Laura Kenny	Great Britain	5	5	5	2	5	5	5	5	5	5	1	10	20		1	78
2nd place, silver medalist(s)	Amalie Dideriksen; Julie Leth	Denmark			2		2	1		1	3	3	3		20		9	35
3rd place, bronze medalist(s)	Gulnaz Khatuntseva; Maria Novolodskaya	ROC						3			1	2			20		6	26
4	Amy Pieters; Kirsten Wild	Netherlands	3	3	3	3			3				2	4			3	21
5	Clara Copponi; Marie Le Net	France	2				3	2		3	2		5	2			4	19
6	Daria Pikulik; Wiktoria Pikulik	Poland		1					1			1		6			2	9
7	Georgia Baker; Annette Edmondson	Australia		2		5				2							7	9
8	Elisa Balsamo; Letizia Paternoster	Italy	1			1											8	2
9	Megan Jastrab; Jennifer Valente	United States			1												5	1
10	Lotte Kopecky; Jolien D'hoore	Belgium							2							20	11	–18
11	Jessie Hodges; Rushlee Buchanan	New Zealand					1									40	10	–39
12	Franziska Brauße; Lisa Klein	Germany														40	12	–40
13	Emily Kay; Shannon McCurley	Ireland														40	DNF	–
13	Yumi Kajihara; Kisato Nakamura	Japan														40	DNF	–
13	Pang Yao; Leung Bo Yee	Hong Kong														40	DNF	–
