= Sarah Hammer =

American cyclist (born 1983)

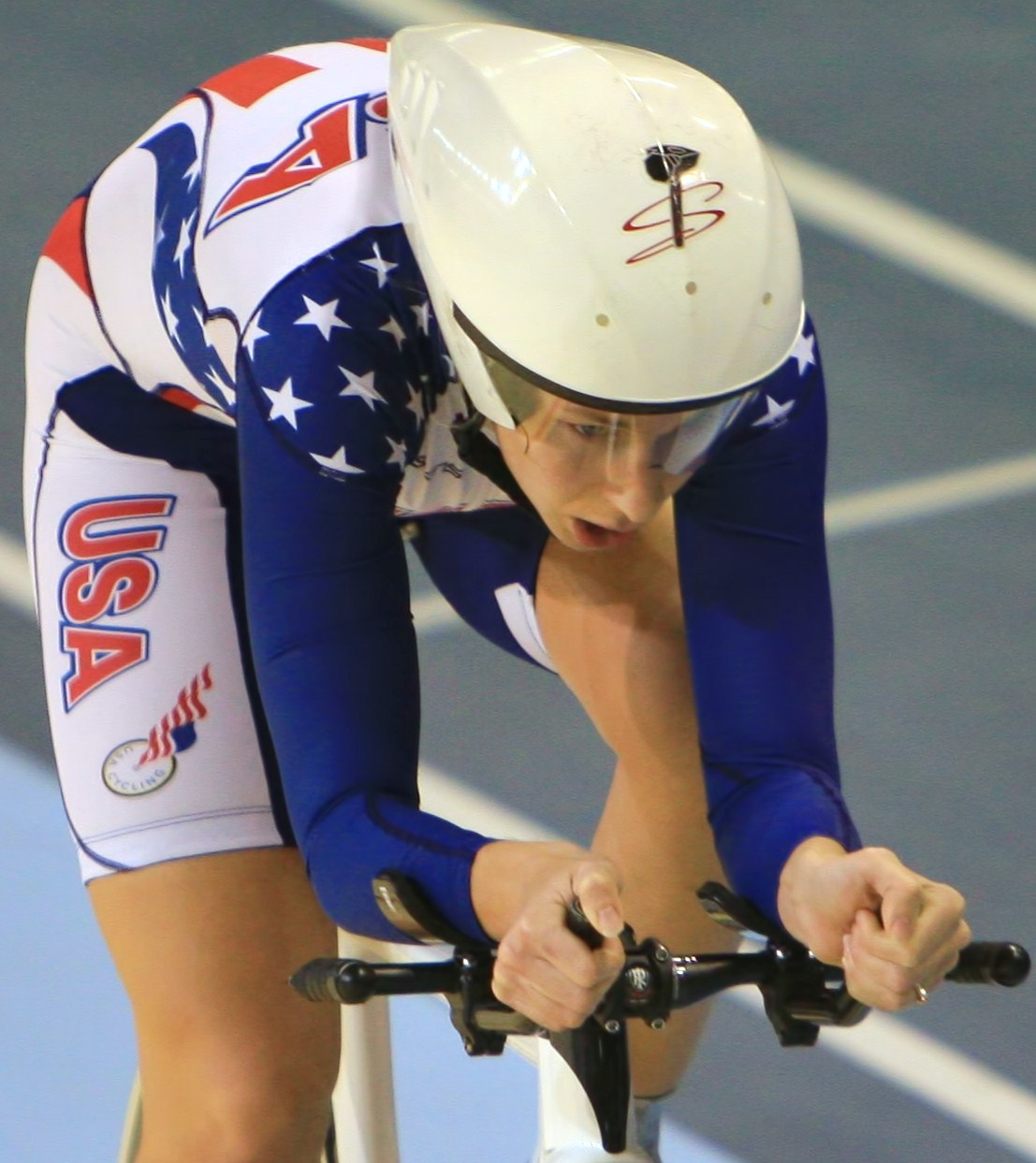
- Hammer competing at the 2010 UCI Track Cycling World Championships

Personal information
- Full name: Sarah Kathryn Hammer
- Born: August 18, 1983 (age 43) United States
- Height: 5 ft 7 in (1.70 m)
- Weight: 135 lb (61 kg)

Cycling career
- Sport: Cycling
- Discipline: Track cycling
Medal record
Olympic Games
Silver medal – second place	2012 London	Team pursuit
Silver medal – second place	2012 London	Omnium
Silver medal – second place	2016 Rio de Janeiro	Team pursuit
Silver medal – second place	2016 Rio de Janeiro	Omnium
World Championships
Gold medal – first place	2006 Bordeaux	Individual pursuit
Gold medal – first place	2007 Palma de Mallorca	Individual pursuit
Gold medal – first place	2010 Ballerup	Individual pursuit
Gold medal – first place	2011 Apeldoorn	Individual pursuit
Gold medal – first place	2013 Minsk	Individual pursuit
Gold medal – first place	2013 Minsk	Omnium
Gold medal – first place	2014 Cali	Omnium
Gold medal – first place	2016 London	Team pursuit
Silver medal – second place	2008 Manchester	Individual pursuit
Silver medal – second place	2011 Apeldoorn	Team pursuit
Silver medal – second place	2011 Apeldoorn	Omnium
Silver medal – second place	2014 Cali	Individual Pursuit
Silver medal – second place	2017 Hong Kong	Points race
Bronze medal – third place	2012 Melbourne	Omnium
Bronze medal – third place	2016 London	Omnium
Pan American Games
Gold medal – first place	2015 Toronto	Omnium
Silver medal – second place	2015 Toronto	Team pursuit
Pan American Championships
Gold medal – first place	2015 Santiago	Omnium
Gold medal – first place	2015 Santiago	Team pursuit

Sarah Kathryn Hammer (born August 18, 1983) is an American former professional racing cyclist and four-times Olympic silver medalist. With eight world championships, she has been called, "America's most decorated track athlete." Hammer announced her retirement from professional Cycling on September 23, 2017.

== Career ==
Hammer is five-times a champion (2006, 2007, 2010, 2011 & 2013) in the individual pursuit and twice a champion (2013 & 2014) in the omnium at the UCI Track Cycling World Championships.

At the 2008 Summer Olympics, Hammer finished fifth overall in the individual pursuit and did not finish in the points race.

At the 2012 Summer Olympics, Hammer won a team silver medal in the Women's team pursuit, as well as an individual silver medal in the women's omnium.

Hammer held the world record in the 3000 m individual pursuit from 2010 until it was broken by Chloé Dygert in 2018.

Hammer announced her retirement from professional Cycling on September 23, 2017.

== Major results ==
2013
Los Angeles Grand Prix

1st Omnium
2nd Team Pursuit (with Kimberly Geist, Jennifer Valente and Ruth Winder)

2014
1st Omnium, Los Angeles Grand Prix
2015
Pan American Track Championships

1st Omnium
1st Team Pursuit (with Kelly Catlin, Ruth Winder and Jennifer Valente)

Pan American Games

1st Omnium
2nd Team Pursuit (with Kelly Catlin, Lauren Tamayo, Ruth Winder and Jennifer Valente)

Independence Day Grand Prix

1st Individual Pursuit
1st Points Race
1st Scratch Race

1st Omnium, Marymoor Grand Prix
2nd Omnium, Grand Prix of Colorado Springs
2017
Belgian International Track Meeting

1st Points Race
3rd Scratch Race

2nd Points race, UCI World Track Championships

Records
Preceded by (New Zealand) Sarah Ulmer	Women's 3000 metre individual pursuit May 11, 2010 – March 3, 2018	Succeeded by (United States) Chloé Dygert
