= Ivanna Borovychenko =

Ukrainian cyclist

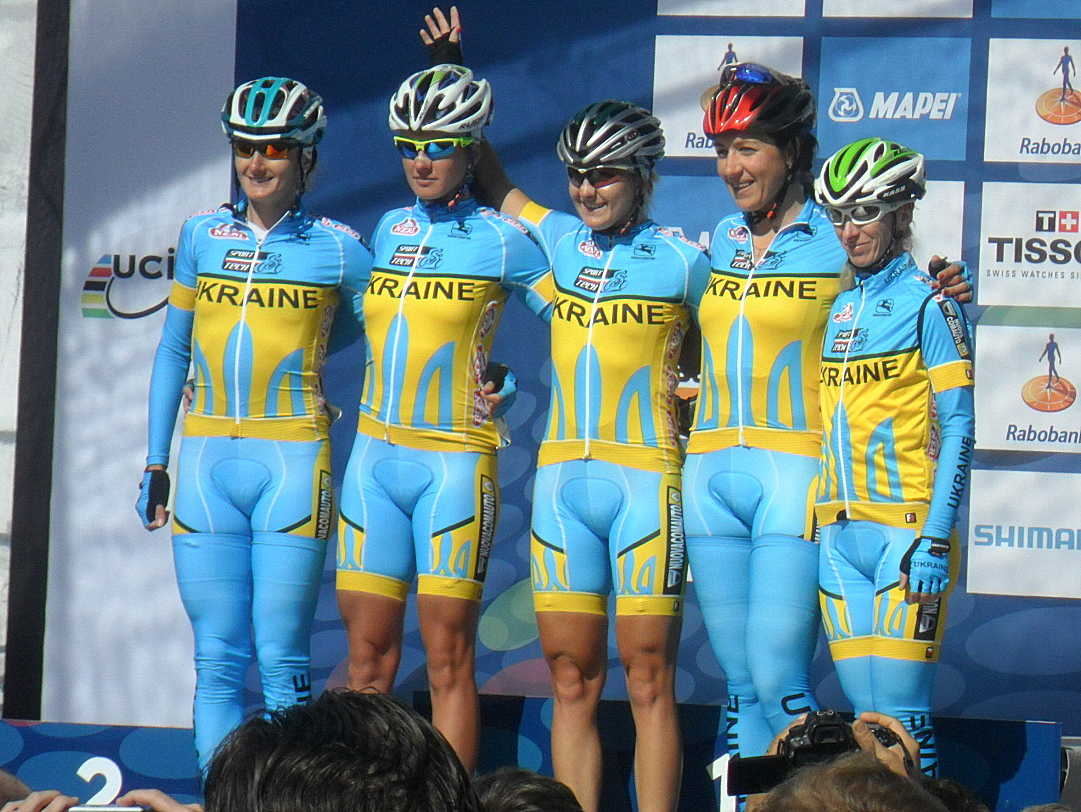
- Ivanna Borovychenko at the 2012 UCI Road World Championships

Personal information
- Born: 7 July 1990 (age 36)

Cycling career
- Sport: Cycling
- Role: Rider

Ivanna Borovychenko (born 7 July 1990) is a Ukrainian racing cyclist. She competed in the 2012 UCI women's road race in Valkenburg aan de Geul and in the 2013 UCI women's road race in Florence.
