= Ellie Dickinson =

British cyclist (born 1998)

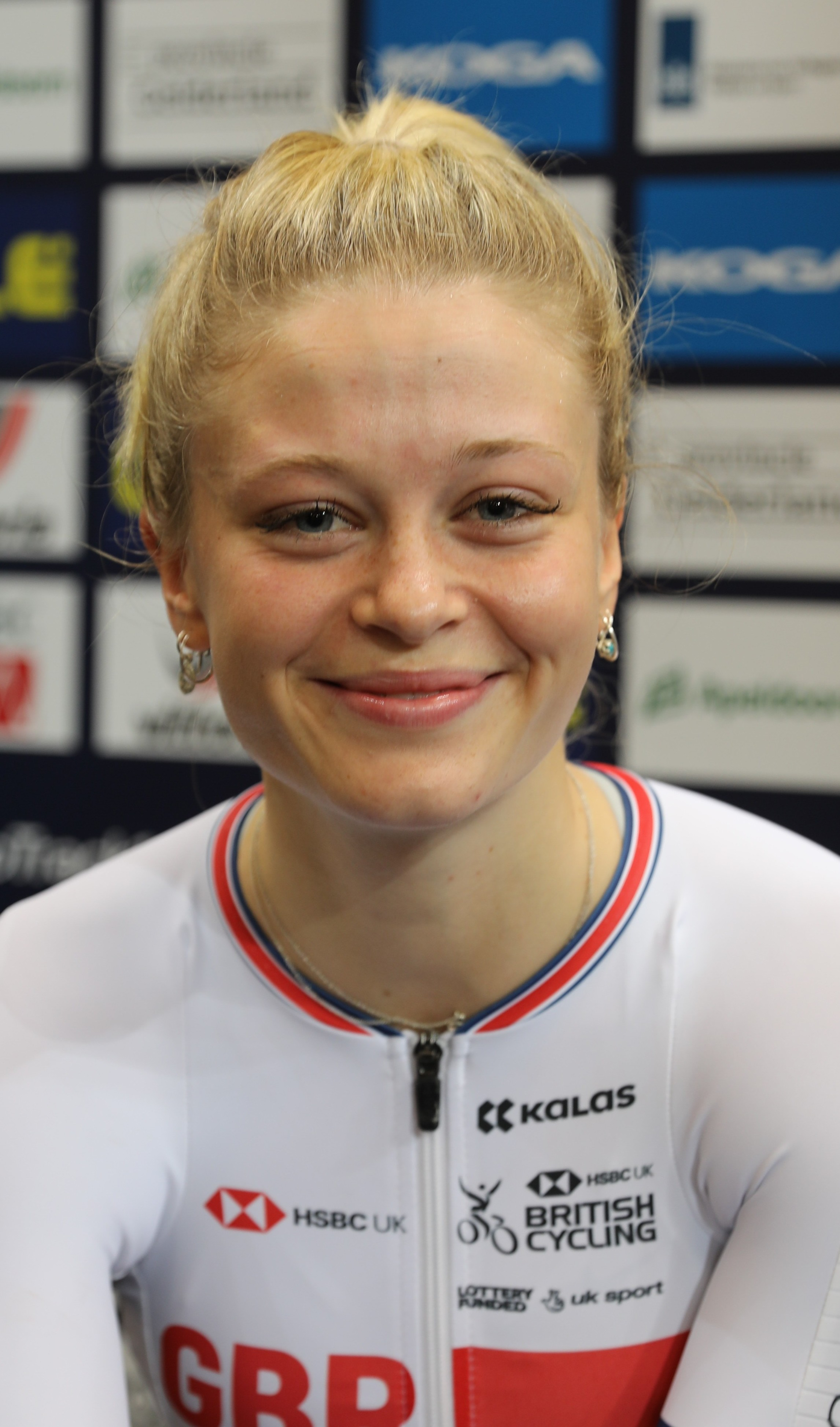
- Dickinson in 2019

Personal information
- Full name: Eleanor May Dickinson
- Nickname: Ellie
- Born: 4 June 1998 (age 28) Carlisle, Cumbria, England

Cycling career
- Sport: Cycling
- Disciplines: Road; Track
- Role: Rider

Amateur teams
- 2010–2011: Border City Wheelers
- 2011–2013: Beacon Wheelers
- 2013–2014: RST Racing Team
- 2014–2015: Giordana Triton
- 2017–2018: Team Breeze

Professional teams
- 2016: Drops
- 2019: Drops
Medal record
World Championships
Silver medal – second place	2018 Apeldoorn	Team pursuit
Silver medal – second place	2019 Pruszków	Team pursuit
Silver medal – second place	2020 Berlin	Team pursuit
European Championships
Gold medal – first place	2017 Berlin	Madison
Gold medal – first place	2018 Glasgow	Team pursuit
Gold medal – first place	2019 Apeldoorn	Team pursuit
Silver medal – second place	2017 Berlin	Team pursuit

Eleanor May "Ellie" Dickinson (born 4 June 1998) is an English road and track cyclist, who last rode for UCI Women's Team Drops, and represents Great Britain at international competitions.

As a junior, she competed at the 2015 UCI Road World Championships in the women's junior road race.

On the track she won the gold medal at Round 1 of the 2016–17 UCI Track Cycling World Cup in the team pursuit, in Glasgow.

== Major results ==
2016
1st Team pursuit – Glasgow, UCI Track Cycling World Cup
2nd Omnium, Track-Cycling Challenge Grenchen
1st Scratch race, Revolution Champions League – Round 1, Manchester
Revolution Round 3, Manchester

1st Scratch race
2nd Points race

2nd Madison, National Track Championships (with Alice Barnes)
2017
UEC European Track Championships

1st Madison (with Elinor Barker)
2nd Team pursuit

UEC European Under-23 Track Championships

1st Madison (with Manon Lloyd)
2nd Individual pursuit
2nd Scratch
2nd Omnium

Grand Prix Poland

1st Points Race
1st Team Pursuit

1st Team pursuit, National Track Championships
4th Overall Six Days of London

3rd Omnium

2018
1st Team pursuit, UEC European Track Championships
2nd Team pursuit, UCI Track World Championships
National Road Championships

2nd Under-23 road race
3rd Road race
