= Gudrun Stock =

German cyclist (born 1995)

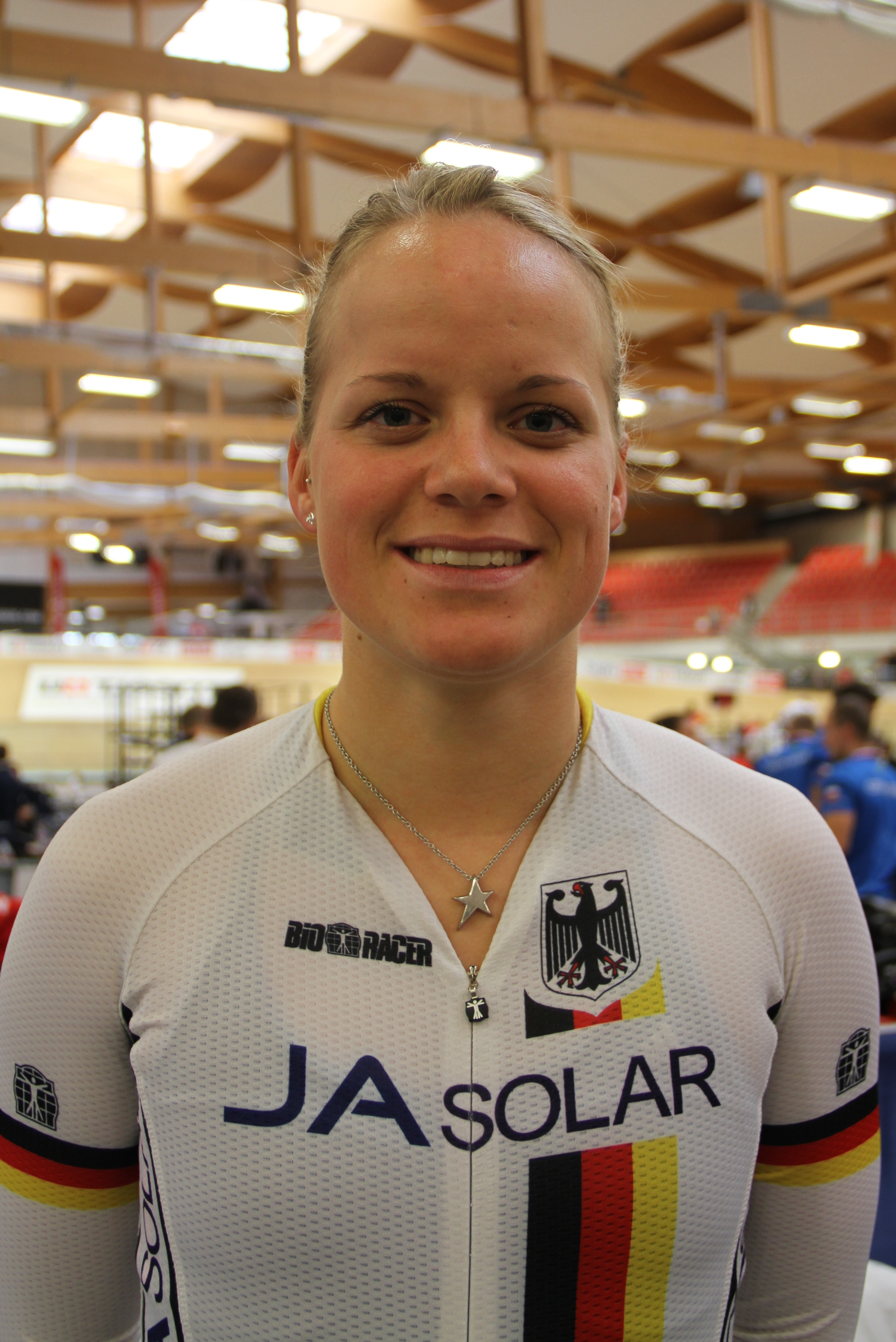
- Gudrun Stock in 2015

Personal information
- Born: 23 May 1995 (age 31) Deggendorf, Germany
- Height: 168 cm (5 ft 6 in)
- Weight: 62 kg (137 lb)

Cycling career
- Sport: Cycling
- Role: Track cyclist
Medal record
Women's track cycling
Representing Germany
World Championships
Bronze medal – third place	2020 Berlin	Team pursuit
European Championships
Silver medal – second place	2019 Apeldoorn	Team pursuit
Bronze medal – third place	2018 Glasgow	Team pursuit

Gudrun Stock (born 23 May 1995) is a German professional racing cyclist. She rode at the 2015 UCI Track Cycling World Championships. She competed at the 2016 Summer Olympic as a member of the German women's pursuit team. The team finished in 9th place.

== Major results ==
2013
4th Road race, National Junior Road Championships
2015
2nd Team pursuit, UEC European U23 Track Championships (with Lisa Klein, Anna Knauer and Mieke Kroeger)
3rd Omnium, Cottbuser Nächte
9th Time Trial, National Road Championships
2020
4th Road race, National Road Championships
2021
1st Sprints classification Healthy Ageing Tour
