= Simona Frapporti =

Italian cyclist

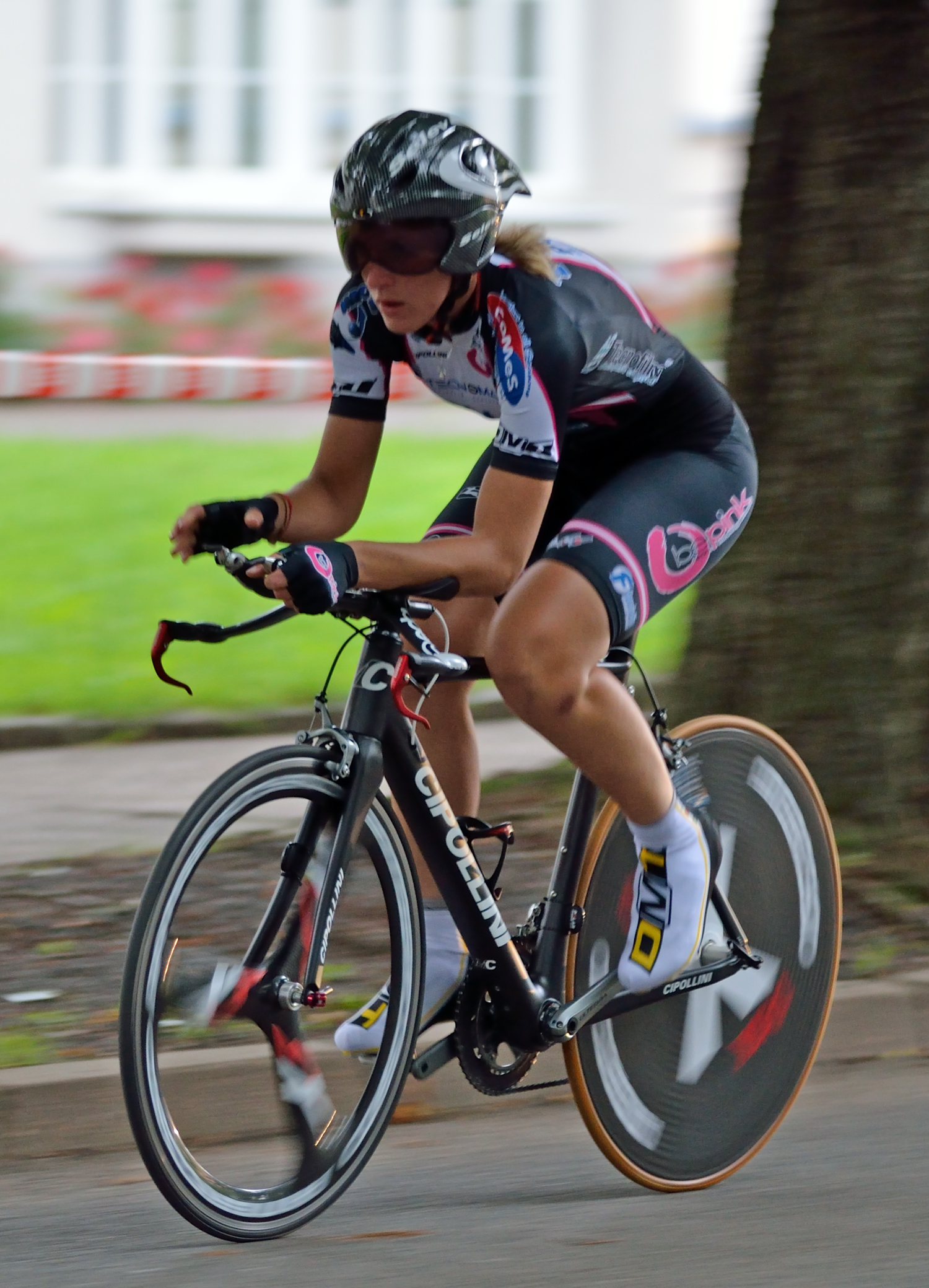
- Frapporti in 2012

Personal information
- Full name: Simona Frapporti
- Born: 14 July 1988 (age 38) Gavardo, Italy

Cycling career
- Sport: Cycling
- Current team: Retired
- Disciplines: Road; Track
- Role: Rider

Amateur team
- G.S. Fiamme Azzurre

Professional teams
- 2008: Cycling Team Titanedi–Frezza Acca Due O
- 2009: USC Chirio Forno d'Asolo
- 2010: Vaiano Solaristech
- 2011: Top Girls–Fassa Bortolo
- 2012–2014: Be Pink
- 2015: Alé–Cipollini
- 2016–2018: Team Hitec Products
- 2019–2021: Bepink
Medal record
Women's track cycling
Representing Italy
World Championships
Bronze medal – third place	2018 Apeldoorn	Team pursuit
European Championships
Gold medal – first place	2016 Yvelines	Team pursuit

Simona Frapporti (born 14 July 1988) is an Italian former racing cyclist, who rode professionally between 2008 and 2021, for seven different teams. She competed in the 2013 UCI women's team time trial in Florence. Frapporti is an athlete of Gruppo Sportivo Fiamme Azzurre.

== Major results ==
=== Track ===
2007
National Track Championships

2nd Team sprint
2nd Sprint

2011
National Track Championships

1st Team pursuit
2nd Individual pursuit

2012
2nd Omnium, National Track Championships
2013
National Track Championships

1st Team sprint
2nd 500m time trial
2nd Keirin

3rd Omnium, Copa Internacional de Pista
2014
National Track Championships

1st 500m time trial
1st Omnium

1st Omnium, 6 Giorni delle Rose
1st Omnium, International Track Women & Men
2nd Omnium, UIV Talents Cup Final
3rd Team pursuit, UEC European Track Championships (with Beatrice Bartelloni, Elena Cecchini, Tatiana Guderzo and Silvia Valsecchi)
2015
1st Points race, 3 Jours d'Aigle
2nd Omnium, Fenioux Piste International
2nd Omnium, Trofeu CAR Anadia Portugal
3rd Scratch, Irish International Track GP
3rd Omnium, Internationale Radsport Meeting
2016
1st Team pursuit, UEC European Track Championships
3 Jours d'Aigle

1st Points race
2nd Scratch
2nd Individual pursuit

National Track Championships

1st Scratch
1st Omnium
1st Individual pursuit
2nd Points race

2nd Team pursuit, 2016–17 UCI Track Cycling World Cup, Glasgow
3rd Omnium, Revolution Champions League
2017
2nd Team pursuit, 2017–18 UCI Track Cycling World Cup, Santiago
2018
2nd Team pursuit, 2017–18 UCI Track Cycling World Cup, Minsk
Team pursuit, 2018–19 UCI Track Cycling World Cup

2nd Milton
3rd London

3rd Team pursuit, UCI Track Cycling World Championships
2019
3rd Team pursuit, 2019–20 UCI Track Cycling World Cup, Glasgow

=== Road ===
2009
8th GP Liberazione
2010
2nd SwissEver GP Cham-Hagendorn
2011
8th GP Liberazione
8th GP Comune di Cornaredo
2012
1st Stage 4 La Route de France
2nd Classica Citta di Padova
5th GP Liberazione
7th Omloop van het Hageland
10th GP Comune di Cornaredo
2014
3rd Team time trial, UCI Road World Championships
9th La Course by Le Tour de France
2015
6th Overall The Women's Tour
7th Novilon EDR Cup
9th Grand Prix de Dottignies
2017
4th Overall Tour of Zhoushan Island
2018
4th Overall Panorama Guizhou International Women's Road Cycling Race
8th Overall Tour of Zhoushan Island
2020
1st Stage 4 Women's Tour Down Under

== See also ==
- 2014 Astana BePink Women's Team season
