= Coralie Demay =

French racing cyclist

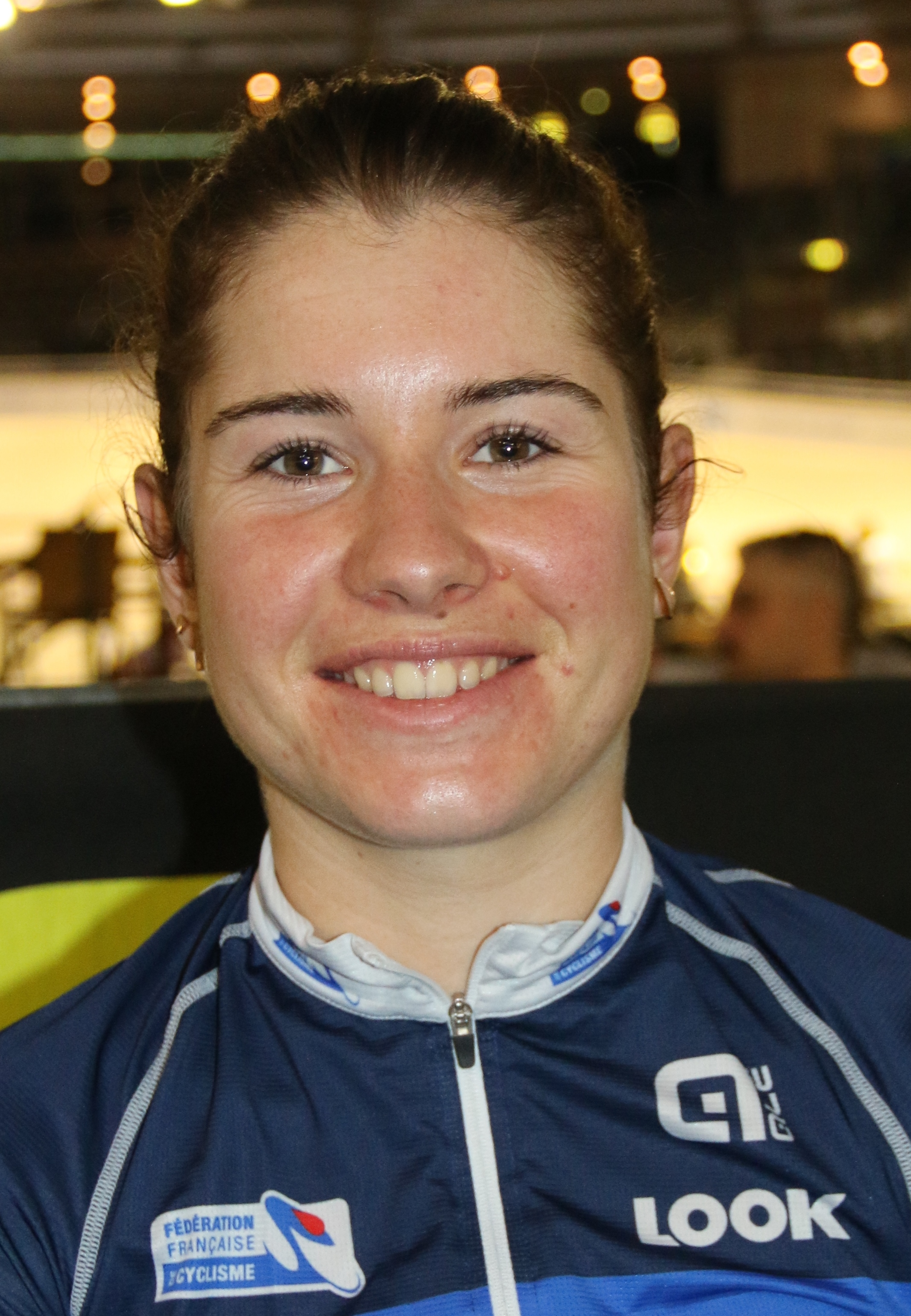
- Demay in 2017

Personal information
- Full name: Coralie Demay
- Born: 10 October 1992 (age 34) Nogent-sur-Marne, France

Cycling career
- Sport: Cycling
- Current team: FDJ United–Suez
- Disciplines: Road; Track
- Role: Rider

Professional teams
- 2016–2019: Poitou-Charentes.Futuroscope.86
- 2020–2021: Charente-Maritime Women Cycling
- 2022–2023: St. Michel–Auber93
- 2024–: FDJ–Suez

Coralie Demay (born 10 October 1992) is a French professional racing cyclist, who currently rides for UCI Women's WorldTeam FDJ United–Suez.

== Major results ==
2016
Fenioux France Trophy

1st Points race
1st Scratch

2018
1st Overall Rás na mBan – Tour of Ireland

1st Stage 4

5th Time trial, National Road Championships
5th Overall Tour of Chongming Island
2019
1st La Périgord Ladies
3rd Time trial, National Road Championships
2020
5th Time trial, National Road Championships
2021
4th Time trial, National Road Championships
10th Chrono des Nations
2022
2nd La Classique Morbihan
5th Time trial, National Road Championships
5th Overall Tour Féminin International des Pyrénées
7th Overall Tour Cycliste Féminin International de l'Ardèche

1st Mountains classification
1st Stage 7

7th Chrono des Nations
7th Grand Prix Velo Alanya
2023
2nd Overall Bretagne Ladies Tour
National Road Championships

3rd Time trial
4th Road race

9th Chrono des Nations
2024
8th Overall Bretagne Ladies Tour
