= Anna Nahirna =

Ukrainian cyclist (born 1988)

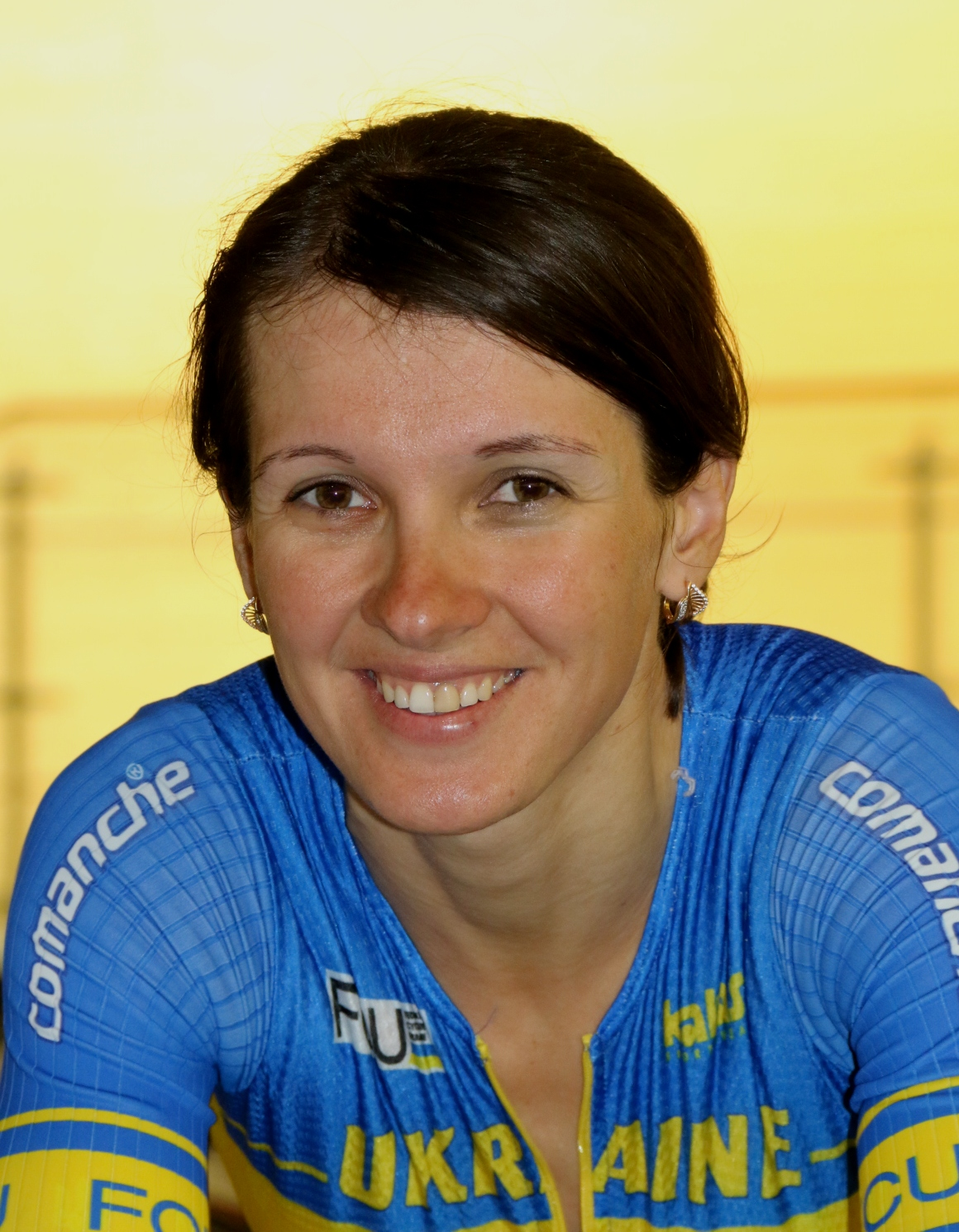
- Nahirna in 2017

Personal information
- Full name: Anna Yuriyivna Nahirna; Ukrainian: Анна Юріївна Нагірна
- Born: 30 September 1988 (age 38): Lviv, Ukrainian SSR, Soviet Union; (now Ukraine)

Cycling career
- Sport: Cycling
- Current team: Lviv Cycling Team
- Disciplines: Road; Track
- Role: Rider
- Rider type: Endurance (track)

Professional team
- 2019–2021: Lviv Cycling Team

Major wins
- One day races & Classics National Time Trial Championships (2012) National Time Trial Championships (2020)
Medal record
Representing Ukraine
Women's track cycling
European Championships
Bronze medal – third place	2020 Plovdiv	Team pursuit

Anna Yuriyivna Nahirna (Ukrainian: Анна Юріївна Нагірна; born 30 September 1988) is a Ukrainian road and track cyclist, who rode for UCI Women's Continental Team Lviv Cycling Team. She participated at the 2012 UCI Road World Championships.

== Major results ==
=== Track ===
2008
National Track Championships

1st Points Race
3rd Individual Pursuit

2013
Copa Internacional de Pista

1st Team Pursuit (with Olena Demydova and Hanna Solovey)
2nd Individual Pursuit

2nd Points Race, Grand Prix of Poland
2nd Omnium, National Track Championships
7th Individual Pursuit, UCI Track Cycling World Championships

2015
National Track Championships

3rd Points Race
3rd Individual Pursuit

2016
National Track Championships

1st Team Pursuit
2nd Omnium

2nd Points Race, Grand Prix Galichyna

2017
National Track Championships

1st Individual Pursuit
1st Team Pursuit
2nd Madison

3rd Points race, Grand Prix Minsk

2018
National Track Championships

1st Individual Pursuit
1st Madison
1st Omnium
1st Points Race
1st Team Pursuit

2019
1st Individual Pursuit, National Track Championships

=== Road ===
2012
1st Time Trial, National Road Championships

2013
3rd Road Race, National Road Championships

2020
1st Road Race, National Road Championships
3rd GP Alanya
