= Alžbeta Bačíková =

Slovak cyclist (born 1990)

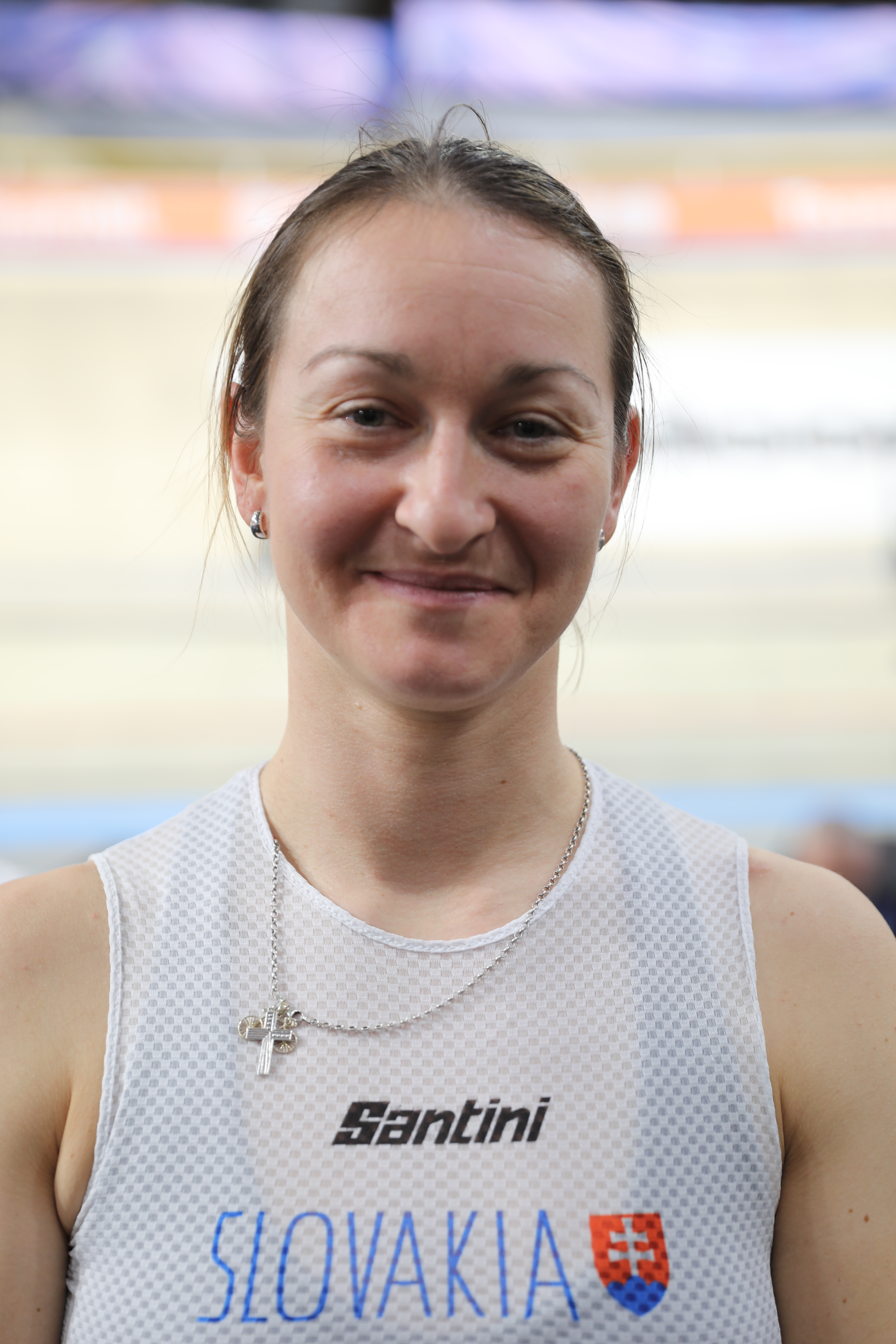
- Bačíková in 2024

Personal information
- Born: Alžbeta Pavlendová; 6 February 1990 (age 36): Krupina, Czechoslovakia; (now Slovakia)
- Height: 1.65 m (5 ft 5 in)
- Weight: 60 kg (132 lb)

Cycling career
- Sport: Cycling
- Disciplines: Road; Track
- Role: Rider

Alžbeta Bačíková (née Pavlendová; born 6 February 1990) is a Slovak professional racing cyclist. She rode at the 2013, 2014 and 2015 UCI Track Cycling World Championships.

== Major results ==
=== Road ===
2009
1st Time trial, National Road Championships
2010
National Road Championships

1st Time trial
2nd Road race

2011
2nd Time trial, National Road Championships
2012
1st Time trial, National Road Championships
2013
1st Time trial, National Road Championships
2014
3rd Road race, National Road Championships
2015
National Road Championships

1st Road race
2nd Time trial

2017
1st Road race, National Road Championships
1st Horizon Park Women Challenge
2018
National Road Championships

3rd Road race
3rd Time trial

2019
1st Road race, National Road Championships
4th Horizon Park Women Challenge
9th Chabany Race

=== Track ===
2013
Grand Prix Vienna

2nd Keirin
2nd Scratch

2014
1st Omnium, Grand Prix Vienna
2nd Scratch, Grand Prix of Poland
2nd Scratch, 3 Jours d'Aigle
2015
Irish International Track GP

1st Points race
3rd Keirin

2nd Scratch, Six Days of Bremen
2nd Scratch, Panevėžys
3rd Keirin, Fenioux Piste International
3rd Scratch, 3 Jours d'Aigle
2016
Grand Prix Vienna

2nd Scratch
3rd Points race

2nd Scratch, Přilba Moravy
3rd Scratch, Six Days of Bremen
2017
2nd Scratch, Grand Prix Minsk
3rd Scratch, Přilba Moravy
2021
National Track Championships

1st Elimination race
1st Omnium
1st Points race
1st Scratch
