= Russia at the UCI Track Cycling World Championships =

Russia at the 2015 UCI Track Cycling World Championships
- IOC code: RUS

in Saint-Quentin-en-Yvelines, France 18 February – 22 February 2015
- Competitors: 27
- Medals Ranked 4th: Gold 2 Silver 2 Bronze 0 Total 4

UCI Track Cycling World Championships appearances (overview)
- Overview page Recent: 2008; 2009; 2010; 2011; 2012; 2013; 2014; 2015; 2016; 2017; 2018; 2019; 2020; 2021; 2022; 2023; 2024; 2025

Russia competed at the 2015 UCI Track Cycling World Championships in Saint-Quentin-en-Yvelines at the Vélodrome de Saint-Quentin-en-Yvelines from 18–22 February 2015. A team of 27 cyclists (13 women, 14 men) was announced to represent the country in the event.

== Results ==
=== Men ===
Name	Event	Result	Rank
Denis Dmitriev	Men's sprint	9.827 (Q),	2nd place, silver medalist(s)
Nikita Shrushin	Men's sprint	9.829 (Q),	16
Alexander Serov	Men's individual pursuit	4:19.284 (q), 4:21.801	4
Alexander Evtushenko	Men's individual pursuit	4:26.875	12
Ivan Kovalev	Men's scratch	—	7
Artur Ershov	Men's points race	31 points	1st place, gold medalist(s)
Viktor Manakov	Men's omnium	141 points	9
Nikita Shurshin	Men's keirin	+0.287	5
Denis Dmitriev	Men's keirin	—	13
Artur Ershov; Alexander Evtushenko; Ivan Kovalev; Alexander Serov	Men's team pursuit	3:59.817 (q),	5
Denis Dmitriev; Nikita Shurshin; Pavel Yakushevskiy	Men's team sprint	43.317 (q), 43468	4

=== Women ===
Name	Event	Result	Rank
Anastasiia Voinova	Women's sprint	10.870 (Q),	6
Olga Hudenko	Women's sprint	11.066 (Q),	16
Victoria Tyumneva	Women's sprint	11.146 (Q),	19
Anastasiia Voinova	Women's 500 m time trial	33.149	1st place, gold medalist(s)
Elena Brejniva	Women's 500 m time trial	33.999	7
Daria Shmeleva	Women's 500 m time trial	34.141	8
Evgenia Romanyuta	Women's points race	5 points	9
Tamara Balabolina	Women's omnium	120 points	9
Evgenia Romanyuta	Women's scratch	—	13
Tamara Balabolina; Gulnaz Badykova; Anastasia Chulkova; Irina Molicheva	Women's team pursuit	4:32.875	9
Daria Shmeleva; Anastasiia Voinova	Women's team sprint	32.518 (Q)	2nd place, silver medalist(s)
Elena Brejniva	Women's keirin	+0.132	8
Ekaterina Gnidenko	Women's keirin	—	21

== 2016 ==
Russia at the 2016 UCI Track Cycling World Championships
- IOC code: RUS

in London, United Kingdom 2 March – 6 March 2016
- Competitors: 29 (16 men, 13 women)
- Medals: Gold 2 Silver 0 Bronze 1 Total 3

UCI Track Cycling World Championships appearances (overview)
- Overview page Recent: 2008; 2009; 2010; 2011; 2012; 2013; 2014; 2015; 2016; 2017; 2018; 2019; 2020; 2021; 2022; 2023; 2024; 2025

Russia competed at the 2016 UCI Track Cycling World Championships at the Lee Valley VeloPark in London, United Kingdom from 2–4 March 2016. A team of 29 cyclists (13 women, 16 men) was announced to represent the country in the event.

== Riders ==
=== Men ===
Ages as of 2 March 2016

Bib	Cyclist	Date of birth (age)
309	Denis Dmitriev	March 23, 1986 (aged 29)
79	Artur Ershov	March 7, 1990 (aged 25)
34	Viktor Manakov	June 9, 1992 (aged 23)
310	Kirill Samusenko	May 8, 1992 (aged 23)
311	Alexander Serov	November 12, 1982 (aged 33)
312	Sergey Shilov	February 6, 1988 (aged 28)
313	Nikita Shurshin	April 8, 1993 (aged 22)
314	Dmitry Sokolov	March 19, 1988 (aged 27)
315	Dmitry Strakhov	May 17, 1995 (aged 20)
316	Kirill Sveshnikov	February 10, 1992 (aged 24)
317	Pavel Yakushevskiy	September 24, 1987 (aged 28)

=== Women ===
Ages as of 2 March 2016

Bib	Cyclist	Date of birth (age)
80	Gulnaz Badykova	April 21, 1994 (aged 21)
40	Tamara Balabolina	August 13, 1993 (aged 22)
319	Alexandra Chekina	February 10, 1993 (aged 23)
320	Anastasia Chulkova	March 7, 1985 (aged 30)
321	Ekaterina Gnidenko	December 11, 1992 (aged 23)
322	Lidia Malakhova	July 13, 1991 (aged 24)
323	Evgeniya Romanyuta	January 22, 1988 (aged 28)
324	Daria Shmeleva	October 26, 1994 (aged 21)
325	Anastasiia Voinova	February 5, 1993 (aged 23)

== Results ==
=== Men ===
Name	Event	Result	Rank
Denis Dmitriev	Men's sprint	9.791	3rd place, bronze medalist(s)
Nikita Shurshin	Men's sprint	9.983	15
Dmitry Sokolov	Men's individual pursuit	4:28.355	13
Kirill Sveshnikov	Men's individual pursuit	4:19.815	6
Artur Ershov	Men's points race	-20 points	14
Viktor Manakov	Men's omnium	121 points	11
Nikita Shurshin	Men's keirin	+0.010	8
Alexander Serov; Sergey Shilov; Dmitry Sokolov; Kirill Sveshnikov; Dmitry Strakhov	Men's team pursuit	3:59.833	5
Pavel Yakushevskiy; Denis Dmitriev; Nikita Shurshin	Men's team sprint	43.538	7

=== Women ===
Name	Event	Result	Rank
Anastasia Voynova	Women's sprint	—	9
Daria Shmeleva	Women's sprint	+0.187	19
Ekaterina Gnidenko	Women's 500 m time trial	34.757	11
Daria Shmeleva	Women's 500 m time trial	33.886	4
Anastasia Voynova	Women's 500 m time trial	32.959	1st place, gold medalist(s)
Anastasia Voynova	Women's points race	5 points	8
Tamara Balabolina	Women's omnium	48 points	20
Ekaterina Gnidenko	Women's keirin	+0.038	18
Anastasia Voynova	Women's keirin	+0.037	19
Evgeniya Romanyuta	Women's scratch	—	6
Tamara Balabolina; Gulnaz Badykova; Anastasia Chulkova; Evgeniya Romanyuta	Women's team pursuit	4:35.521	12
Daria Shmeleva; Anastasia Voynova	Women's team sprint	32.679	1st place, gold medalist(s)
