= Lithuania at the UEC European Track Championships =

Lithuania at the 2008 European Track Championships
- IOC code: LTU

in Pruszków, Poland 3 September – 7 September 2008
- Competitors: 15 in 17 events
- Medals Ranked 9thth: Gold 1 Silver 0 Bronze 0 Total 1

European Track Championships appearances
- See Lithuania at the European Track Championships

Lithuania competed at the 2008 European Track Championships in Pruszków, Poland, from 3 September to 7 September 2008. Lithuania competed in 14 of the 34 events.

== List of medalists ==
Medal	Name	Event	Date
Gold	Vilija Sereikaitė	U23 women's individual pursuit	6 September

== Results ==
=== Elite ===
==== Omnium ====
Cyclist	Event	Elimination		Scratch		Individual pursuit		Points race		Total points	Rank
Cyclist	Event	Points	Rank	Points	Rank	Points	Rank	Points	Rank	Total points	Rank
Inga Čilvinaitė	Women's omnium	0		1	12	4	9	15	1	20	9
Svetlana Pauliukaitė	Women's omnium	0		0		0		6	7	6	14

=== Under-23 ===
==== Time trial ====
Cyclist	Event	Final	
Cyclist	Event	Time Speed (km/h)	Rank
Gintarė Gaivenytė	U23 women's 500 m time trial	36.970; 48.688	7

==== Individual Pursuit ====
Cyclist	Event	Qualification		Semifinals		Final
Cyclist	Event	Time Speed (km/h)	Rank	Opponent Results	Opponent Results	Rank
Ramūnas Navardauskas	U23 men's individual pursuit	4:33.148; 52.718	11	Did not advance		11
Vilija Sereikaitė	U23 women's individual pursuit	3:33.766; 50.522	1 Q	Halyuk (UKR); W 3:42.052; 48.637	Ellen van Dijk (NED); W 3:34.781; 50.283	1st place, gold medalist(s)

==== Scratch ====
Cyclist	Event	Qualification	Final
Cyclist	Event	Rank	Rank
Gediminas Kaupas	U23 men's scratch	11 Q	18
Tomas Micė	U23 men's scratch	16	Did not advance
Inga Čilvinaitė	U23 women's scratch	—	22

==== Points race ====
Cyclist	Event	Qualification				Final			
Cyclist	Event	Points	Laps	Finish order	Rank	Points	Laps	Finish order	Rank
Tomas Micė	U23 men's points race	5	0	1	11 Q	10	1	12	9
Ramūnas Navardauskas	U23 men's points race	13	0	3	10 Q	—	-1	DNF	
Inga Čilvinaitė	U23 women's points race	N/A				0	0	8	15

=== Junior ===
==== Time trial ====
Cyclist	Event	Final	
Cyclist	Event	Time Speed (km/h)	Rank
Arnoldas Laurisonis	Junior men's 1 km time trial	1:08.295; 52.712	18
Vaida Pikauskaitė	Junior women's 500 m time trial	38.570; 46.668	15

==== Individual Pursuit ====
Cyclist	Event	Qualification		Final	
Cyclist	Event	Time Speed (km/h)	Rank	Opponent Results	Rank
Vladimiras Kokorevas	Junior men's individual pursuit	3:32.460; 50.833	25	Did not advance	25
Vismantas Mockevicius	Junior men's individual pursuit	3:33.104; 50.679	27	Did not advance	27
Katažyna Sosna	Junior women's individual pursuit	2:31.780; 47.437	7	Did not advance	7
Vaida Pikauskaitė	Junior women's individual pursuit	2:31.932; 47.389	8	Did not advance	8

==== Team Pursuit ====
Cyclists	Event	Qualification		Final	
Cyclists	Event	Time Speed (km/h)	Rank	Opponent Results	Rank
Vladimiras Kokorevas; Darijus Dzervus; Arnoldas Laurisonis; Vismantas Mockevicius	Junior men's individual pursuit	4:29.298; 53.472	14	Did not advance	14

==== Scratch ====
Cyclist	Event	Qualification	Final
Cyclist	Event	Rank	Rank
Arnoldas Laurisonis	Junior men's scratch	15	Did not advance
Darijus Dzervus	Junior men's scratch	DNF	Did not advance
Katažyna Sosna	Junior women's scratch	—	16
Aleksandra Sošenko	Junior women's scratch	—	17

==== Points race ====
Cyclist	Event	Qualification				Final			
Cyclist	Event	Points	Laps	Finish order	Rank	Points	Laps	Finish order	Rank
Vismantas Mockevicius	Junior men's points race	10	0	1	1 Q	0	0	9	17
Vladimiras Kokorevas	Junior men's points race	-20	-1	14	18	Did not advance			
Katažyna Sosna	Junior women's points race	20	1	12	3 Q	0	0	19	19
Vaida Pikauskaitė	Junior women's points race	2	0	3	8 Q	0	0	8	13

== See also ==
- Belarus at the 2008 UEC European Track Championships
- (United Kingdom) Great Britain at the 2008 UEC European Track Championships
- Netherlands at the 2008 UEC European Track Championships
