= 2014 European Track Championships (under-23 & junior) =

- Venue: Anadia, Portugal
- Date: 22–27 July 2014
- Velodrome: Velódromo Nacional de Sangalhos
- Events: 38

The 2014 European Track Championships (under-23 & junior) were the 14th continental championships for European under-23 and junior track cyclists, and the 5th since the event was renamed following the reorganisation of European track cycling in 2010. The event took place at the Velódromo Nacional de Sangalhos in Anadia, Portugal from 22 to 27 July 2014. This was the fourth year in succession the championships were held at this venue.

== Medal summary ==
=== Under 23 ===
Event	Gold		Silver		Bronze	
Men's events
Men's under-23 sprint	Nikita Shurshin; Russia		Jeffrey Hoogland; Netherlands		Eoin Mullen; Ireland	
Men's under-23 1 km time trial	Robin Wagner; Czech Republic		Aleksandr Dubchenko; Russia; Matthijs Büchli; Netherlands		none awarded	
Men's under-23 individual pursuit	Stefan Küng; Switzerland		Kirill Sveshnikov; Russia		Tom Bohli; Switzerland	
Men's under-23 team pursuit	Tom Bohli; Théry Schir; Frank Pasche; Stefan Küng; Switzerland		Viktor Manakov; Alexander Evtushenko; Andrey Sazanov; Aleksander Grigorev; Russia		Sebastian Wotschke; Marco Mathis; Domenic Weinstein; Leon Rohde; Germany	
Men's under-23 team sprint	Matthijs Büchli; Jeffrey Hoogland; Nils van 't Hoenderdaal; Netherlands		Mateusz Lipa; Mateusz Rudyk; Patryk Rajkowski; Poland		Robert Kanter; Richard Assmus; Maximilian Dörnbach; Germany	
Men's under-23 keirin	Nikita Shurshin; Russia		Matthijs Büchli; Netherlands		Mateusz Lipa; Poland	
Men's under-23 scratch race	Benjamin Thomas; France		Oliver Wood; United Kingdom		Raman Ramanau; Belarus	
Men's under-23 points race	Andrey Sazanov; Russia		Thomas Boudat; France		Jasper De Buyst; Belgium	
Men's under-23 madison	Domenic Weinstein; Leon Rohde; Germany		Jasper De Buyst; Otto Vergaerde; Belgium		Marc Fournier; Thomas Boudat; France	
Men's under-23 omnium	Lucas Liss; Germany		Viktor Manakov; Russia		Gael Suter; Switzerland	
Women's events
Women's under-23 sprint	Anastasia Voynova; Russia		Elis Ligtlee; Netherlands		Tania Calvo Barbero; Spain	
Women's under-23 500 m time trial	Anastasia Voynova; Russia	33.553	Daria Shmeleva; Russia	34.406	Elis Ligtlee; Netherlands	34.425
Women's under-23 individual pursuit	Mieke Kröger; Germany	3:40.502	Alexsandra Goncharova; Russia	3:42.066	Lotte Kopecky; Belgium	3:44.441
Women's under-23 team pursuit	Gulnaz Badykova; Tamara Balabolina; Alexandra Chekina; Alexsandra Goncharova; Russia	4:30.382	Polina Pivovarova; Ina Savenka; Maryna Shmayankova; Volha Masiukovich; Belarus	4:38.520	Francesca Pattaro; Maria Giulia Confalonieri; Beatrice Bartelloni; Elena Cecchini; Italy	4:34.734
Women's under-23 team sprint	Anastasia Voynova; Daria Shmeleva; Russia	33.630	Elis Ligtlee; Yesna Rijkhoff; Netherlands	34.611	Katie Marchant; Rosie Blount; Great Britain	34.604
Women's under-23 keirin	Elis Ligtlee; Netherlands		Melissandre Pain; France		Katie Marchant; Great Britain	
Women's under-23 scratch race	Tamara Balabolina; Russia		Alexsandra Goncharova; Russia		Elena Cecchini; Italy	
Women's under-23 points race	Elena Cecchini; Italy	60	Maria Giulia Confalonieri; Italy	60	Alexandra Chekina; Russia	49
Women's under-23 omnium	Tamara Balabolina; Russia		Ina Sevenka; Belarus		Tetyana Klimchenko; Ukraine	

=== Junior ===
Event	Gold		Silver		Bronze	
Men's events
Junior Men's Sprint	Alexey Nosov; Russia		Sergei Gorlov; Russia		Patryk Rajkowski; Poland	
Junior Men's 1 km Time Trial	Jiří Janošek; Czech Republic	1:03.330	Sam Ligtlee; Denmark	1:04.868	Aaron Reiss; Germany	1:05.024
Junior Men's Individual Pursuit	Ivo Oliveira; Portugal	3:17.704	Corentin Ermenault; France	3:19.732	Daniel Staniszewski; Poland	3:23.571
Junior Men's Team Pursuit	Russia	4:09.810	Great Britain	4:11.608	Switzerland	4:11.476
Junior Men's Team Sprint	Russia	45.505	Poland	46.261	France	46.666
Junior Men's Keirin	Patryk Rajkowski; Poland		Moritz Meissner; Germany		Jiri Fanta; Czech Republic	
Junior Men's Scratch	Attilio Viviani; Italy		Gabriel Cullaigh; United Kingdom		Rui Oliveira; Portugal	
Junior Men's Points Race	Corentin Ermenault; France		Mark Downey; Ireland		Gabriel Cullaigh; United Kingdom	
Junior Men's Madison	Russia		Switzerland		Great Britain	
Junior Men's Omnium	Xavier Cañellas Sanchez; Spain		Gino Mader; Switzerland		Ivo Oliveira; Portugal	
Women's events
Junior Women's Sprint	Tatiana Kiseleva; Russia		Emma Hinze; Germany		Nicky Degrendele; Belgium	
Junior Women's 500 m Time Trial	Tatiana Kiseleva; Russia	35.720	Doreen Heinze; Germany	35.803	Olena Starikova; Ukraine	35.812
Junior Women's Individual Pursuit	Daria Egorova; Russia	2:28.941	Josie Knight; Ireland	2:29.669	Agata Drozdek; Poland	2:28.341
Junior Women's Team Pursuit	Great Britain	4:39.707	Poland	4:47.513	France	4:48.345
Junior Women's Team Sprint	Germany	34.689	Russia	35.075	Belgium	35.477
Junior Women's Keirin	Nicky Degrendele; Belgium		Tatiana Kiseleva; Russia		Julita Jagodzińska; Poland	
Junior Women's Scratch	Elena Bissolati; Italy		Diana Klimova; Russia		Claudia Cretti; Italy	
Junior Women's Points Race	Manon Lloyd; United Kingdom		Lisa Klein; Germany		Diana Klimova; Russia	
Junior Women's Omnium	Edita Mazureviciute; Lithuania		Grace Garner; United Kingdom		Soline Lamboley; France	

== Medal table ==
Rank	Nation	Gold	Silver	Bronze	Total
1	Russia (RUS)	16	11	2	29
2	Germany (GER)	4	4	3	11
3	Italy (ITA)	3	1	3	7
4	Netherlands (NED)	2	6	1	9
5	Great Britain (GBR)	2	4	4	10
6	France (FRA)	2	3	4	9
7	Switzerland (SUI)	2	2	3	7
8	Czech Republic (CZE)	2	0	1	3
9	Poland (POL)	1	3	5	9
10	Belgium (BEL)	1	1	4	6
11	Portugal (POR)	1	0	2	3
12	Spain (ESP)	1	0	1	2
13	Lithuania (LTU)	1	0	0	1
14	Belarus (BLR)	0	2	1	3
14	Ireland (IRL)	0	2	1	3
16	Ukraine (UKR)	0	0	2	2
Totals (16 entries)		38	39	37	114
