= 2009–10 UCI Track Cycling World Cup Classics – Round 2 – Women's team pursuit =

Round 2 – Women's team pursuit
2009–2010 UCI Track Cycling World Cup Classics, race 2/4

Race details
- Dates: 21 November 2009
- Stages: 1
- Distance: 3 km (1.864 mi)
- Winning time: 3:24.771

Medalists
	Gold	New Zealand; Kaytee Boyd; Lauren Ellis; Alison Shanks
	Silver	United Kingdom; Katie Colclough; Wendy Houvenaghel; Joanna Rowsell
	Bronze	Australia; Ashlee Ankudinoff; Sarah Kent; Josephine Tomic

The second round of the women's team pursuit of the 2009–2010 UCI Track Cycling World Cup Classics took place in Melbourne, Australia on 21 November 2009. 11 teams participated in the contest.

== Competition format ==
The women's team pursuit race consists of a 3 km race between two teams of three cyclists, starting on opposite sides of the track. If one team catches the other, the race is over.

The tournament consisted of an initial qualifying round. The top two teams in the qualifying round advanced to the gold medal match and the third and fourth teams advanced to the bronze medal race.

== Schedule ==
Saturday 21 November
13:15-14:20 Qualifying
20:30-20:45 Finals
21:20-21:30 Victory Ceremony

Schedule from Tissottiming.com

== Results ==
=== Qualifying ===
Rank	Country	Cyclists	Result	Notes
1	New Zealand	Rushlee Buchanan; Lauren Ellis; Alison Shanks	3:26.890	Q
2	United Kingdom	Katie Colclough; Wendy Houvenaghel; Joanna Rowsell	3:27.310	Q
3	Australia	Ashlee Ankudinoff; Sarah Kent; Josephine Tomic	3:27.678	q
4	Ukraine	Svitlana Halyuk; Lesya Kalytovska; Iryna Shpylova	3:29.004	q
5	Germany	Lisa Brennauer; Elka Gebhardt; Madeleine Sandig	3:31.185	
6	Belgium	Jessie Daams; Jolien D'hoore; Kelly Druyts	3:35.692	
7	Netherlands	Ellen van Dijk; Yvonne Hijgenaar; Willy Kanis	3:37.524	
8	Rodin	Skye Lee Armstrong; Rochelle Gilmore; Kelly Helen	3:41.017	
9	United States	Lauren Franges; Kimberly Geist; Shelley Olds	3:43.126	
10	Italy	Alessandra Borchi; Giorgia Bronzini; Marta Tagliaferro	3:46.239	
11	South Korea	Eun Ji Lee; Ju Mi Lee; Min Hye Lee	3:50.583	

Results from Tissottiming.com.

=== Finals ===
==== Final bronze medal race ====
Rank	Team	Cyclists	Result	Notes
3rd place, bronze medalist(s)	Australia	Ashlee Ankudinoff; Sarah Kent; Josephine Tomic	3:26.869	
4	Ukraine	Lesya Kalytovska; Lyubov Shulika; Iryna Shpylova	3:30.156	

Results from Tissottiming.com.

==== Final gold medal race ====
Rank	Team	Cyclists	Result	Notes
1st place, gold medalist(s)	New Zealand	Kaytee Boyd; Lauren Ellis; Alison Shanks	3:24.771	
2nd place, silver medalist(s)	United Kingdom	Katie Colclough; Wendy Houvenaghel; Joanna Rowsell	3:25.938	

Results from Tissottiming.com.

== See also ==
- 2009–2010 UCI Track Cycling World Cup Classics – Round 2 – Women's individual pursuit
- 2009–2010 UCI Track Cycling World Cup Classics – Round 2 – Women's points race
- 2009–2010 UCI Track Cycling World Cup Classics – Round 2 – Women's scratch race
- UCI Track Cycling World Cup Classics – Women's team pursuit
