= 2013 UEC European Track Championships – Women's team pursuit =

Women's team pursuit at the 2013 UEC European Track Championships
- UEC European Champion jersey
- Venue: Omnisport Apeldoorn, Apeldoorn
- Date: 18 October
- Competitors: 37 from 9 nations
- Winning time: 4:26.556 WR

Medalists
gold medal	Laura Trott; Dani King; Elinor Barker; Katie Archibald; Joanna Rowsell	Great Britain
silver medal	Katarzyna Pawłowska; Eugenia Bujak; Małgorzata Wojtyra; Edyta Jasińska	Poland
bronze medal	Aleksandra Chekina; Evgenia Romanyuta; Gulnaz Badykova; Maria Mishina	Russia

The Women's team pursuit at the 2013 UEC European Track Championships was held on 18 October 2013. 9 nations participated. This was the first time the event had been held in the new four person, 4000 metres format. Notwithstanding the change in format, the event continued to be dominated by Great Britain, who won the final against Poland in a new world record.

== Results ==
The event was held over two rounds, both run on the same day. all teams competed in the qualification round, while the teams with the fastest 2 teams raced for gold in the final. The teams with the third and fourth fast times raced in the bronze medal final. The Great Britain team set a new world record in qualification, bettering their own previous mark. In the final, with a slightly revised line up, they repeated the feat against fellow finalists Poland to set a second world record. In the bronze medal ride off, russia held off the team from Belgium for the last medal.

=== Qualifying ===
Rank	Name	Nation	Time	Notes
1	Laura Trott; Joanna Rowsell; Elinor Barker; Katie Archibald	Great Britain	4:28.738	Q, WR
2	Katarzyna Pawłowska; Eugenia Bujak; Małgorzata Wojtyra; Edyta Jasińska	Poland	4:38.229	Q
3	Aleksandra Chekina; Evgenia Romanyuta; Gulnaz Badykova; Maria Mishina	Russia	4:38.304	q
4	Evelyn Arys; Els Belmans; Jolien D'Hoore; Kelly Druyts	Belgium	4:40.953	q
5	Ivanna Borovychenko; Valeriya Kononenko; Anna Nahirna; Hanna Solovey	Ukraine	4:41.990	
6	Beatrice Bartelloni; Elena Cecchini; Simona Frapporti; Chiara Vannucci	Italy	4:42.073	
7	Volha Masiukovich; Polina Pivavarava; Ina Savenka; Marina Shmayankova	Belarus	4:44.195	
8	Lisa Fischer; Mieke Kröger; Lisa Küllmer; Stephanie Pohl	Germany	4:44.241	
9	Aušrinė Trebaitė; Roberta Pilkausaitė; Vitalija Sereikaitė; Eglė Zablockytė	Lithuania	5:00.623	

=== Finals ===
Rank	Name	Nation	Time	Notes
1st place, gold medalist(s)	Laura Trott; Katie Archibald; Elinor Barker; Dani King	Great Britain	4:26.556	WR
2nd place, silver medalist(s)	Katarzyna Pawłowska; Eugenia Bujak; Małgorzata Wojtyra; Edyta Jasińska	Poland	4:35.957	
3rd place, bronze medalist(s)	Aleksandra Chekina; Evgenia Romanyuta; Gulnaz Badykova; Maria Mishina	Russia	4:34.491	
4	Evelyn Arys; Els Belmans; Jolien D'Hoore; Kelly Druyts	Belgium	4:43.337	
