= 2009–10 UCI Track Cycling World Cup Classics – Round 2 – Women's points race =

Round 2 Women's points race
2009–2010 UCI Track Cycling World Cup Classics, race 2/4

Race details
- Dates: 20 November 2009
- Stages: 1
- Distance: 20 km (12.43 mi)
- Winning time: 26:01.053

Medalists
	Gold	Giorgia Bronzini (ITA)
	Silver	Shelley Olds (USA)
	Bronze	Madeleine Sandig (GER)

The women's points race during the second round of the 2009–2010 UCI Track Cycling World Cup Classics was the second women's scratch race in this season. It took place in Melbourne, Australia on 20 November 2009. 34 Athletes participated in the contest.

== Competition format ==
A points race is a race in which all riders start together and the object is to earn points during sprints or to lap the bunch.

The tournament consisted of two qualifying heats of 10 km (40 laps). The top twelve cyclist of each heat advanced to the 20 km final (80 laps).

== Schedule ==
Friday 20 November
12:00-12:20 Qualifying, heat 1
12:20-12:40 Qualifying, heat 2
19:30-22:00 Final
20:25-20:30 Victory Ceremony

Schedule from Tissottiming.com

== Results ==
=== Qualifying ===
Qualifying Heat 1

Rank	Cyclist	Team	Points	Notes
1	Josephine Tomic	Australia	10	Q
2	Leire Olaberria Dorronsoro	Spain	7	Q
3	Jolien D'Hoore	Belgium	5	Q
4	Ellen van Dijk	Netherlands	5	Q
5	Skye Lee Armstrong	Rodin	4	Q
6	Aušrinė Trebaitė	Lithuania	4	Q
7	Evgenia Romanyuta	Russia	3	Q
8	Marta Tagliaferro	Italy	3	Q
9	Elke Gebhardt	Germany	2	Q
10	Pascale Schnider	Switzerland	1	Q
11	Yekatsiryna Barazna	Belarus	0	Q
12	Lauren Franges	United States	0	Q
13	Wan Yiu Jamie Wong	Hong Kong	0	
14	Jessie MacLean	Verducci Breakaway Racing	0	
15	Ju Mi Lee	South Korea	0	
	Adriana Martinez	Mexico	-20	DNF
	Penny Day	PHN		DNF

Results from Tissottiming.com.

Qualifying Heat 2

Rank	Cyclist	Team	Points	Notes
1	Madeleine Sandig	Germany	25	Q
2	Min Hye Lee	South Korea	23	Q
3	Belinda Goss	Australia	8	Q
4	Joanne Kiesanowski	New Zealand	6	Q
5	Laura Mccaughey	SAL	6	Q
6	Giorgia Bronzini	Italy	5	Q
7	Theresa Cliff-Ryan	Verducci Breakaway Racing	4	Q
8	Andrea Wölfer	Switzerland	3	Q
9	Anna Nahirna	Ukraine	2	Q
10	Shelley Olds	United States	1	Q
11	Venera Absalyamova	Russia	1	Q
12	Jessie Daams	Belgium	0	Q
13	Dulce Pliego	Mexico	0	
14	Rosy Mccall	GIS	0	
15	Ana Usabiaga Balerdi	EUS	0	

Results from Tissottiming.com.

=== Final ===
Rank	Cyclist	Team	Points
1st place, gold medalist(s)	Giorgia Bronzini	Italy	16
2nd place, silver medalist(s)	Shelley Olds	United States	11
3rd place, bronze medalist(s)	Madeleine Sandig	Germany	11
4	Evgenia Romanyuta	Russia	10
5	Belinda Goss	Australia	8
6	Leire Olaberria Dorronsoro	Spain	8
7	Joanne Kiesanowski	New Zealand	6
8	Jolien D'Hoore	Belgium	5
9	Josephine Tomic	Australia	4
10	Andrea Wölfer	Switzerland	2
11	Ellen van Dijk	Netherlands	2
12	Skye Lee Armstrong	Rodin	2
13	Elke Gebhardt	Germany	1
14	Yekatsiryna Barazna	Belarus	1
15	Pascale Schnider	Switzerland	1
16	Anna Nahirna	Ukraine	0
17	Aušrinė Trebaitė	Lithuania	0
18	Venera Absalyamova	Russia	0
19	Theresa Cliffryan	Verducci Breakaway Racing	0
20	Marta Tagliaferro	Italy	0
21	Laura Mccaughey	SAL	0
22	Min Hye Lee	South Korea	0
23	Jessie Daams	Belgium	0
24	Lauren Franges	United States	0

Results from Tissottiming.com.

== See also ==
- 2009–2010 UCI Track Cycling World Cup Classics – Round 2 – Women's individual pursuit
- 2009–2010 UCI Track Cycling World Cup Classics – Round 2 – Women's scratch race
- 2009–2010 UCI Track Cycling World Cup Classics – Round 2 – Women's team pursuit
