= 2012 European Track Championships – Women's points race =

UEC European Champion jersey

The Women's points race was held on 19 October 2012. 12 riders participated over a distance of 25 kilometres (15.5 miles) – or 100 laps – with a sprint every 10 laps for extra points. A lap gained 20 points.

== Medalists ==
Gold	Stephanie Pohl (GER)
Silver	Evgenia Romanyuta (RUS)
Bronze	Elke Gebhardt (GER)

== Results ==
The race was held at 20:38.

Rank	Name	Nation	Sprint points	Lap points	Final sprint	Total points
1st place, gold medalist(s)	Stephanie Pohl	Germany	13	20	6	33
2nd place, silver medalist(s)	Evgenia Romanyuta	Russia	25	0	1	25
3rd place, bronze medalist(s)	Elke Gebhardt	Germany	20	0	4	20
4	Maria Giulia Confalonieri	Italy	9	0	3	9
5	Maria Mishina	Russia	6	0	2	6
6	Małgorzata Wojtyra	Poland	5	0	7	5
7	Elena Cecchini	Italy	3	0	11	3
8	Tatsiana Sharakova	Belarus	13	−20	9	−7
9	Volha Masiukovich	Belarus	6	−20	5	−14
10	Eugenia Bujak	Poland	5	−20	8	−15
11	Alžbeta Pavlendová	Slovakia	4	−20	10	−16
–	Eglė Zablockytė	Lithuania	1	−40	0	DNF
