= 2008 UEC European Track Championships – Women's under-23 points race =

U23 Women's points race
2008 European Track Championships
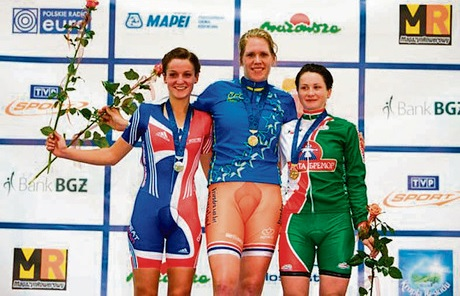
- Podium: 1) Ellen van Dijk, 2) Lizzie Armitstead, 3) Aksana Papko

Race details
- Dates: 6 September 2008
- Stages: 1
- Distance: 25 km (15.53 mi)
- Winning time: 32' 48.140"

Medalists
	Gold	Ellen van Dijk (the Netherlands)
	Silver	Lizzie Armitstead (United Kingdom)
	Bronze	Aksana Papko (Belarus)

The Women's Points Race was one of the 8 under-23 women's events at the 2008 European Track Championships, held in Pruszków, Poland. The race was held on 6 September and 22 cyclists from 14 countries participated in the event.

Ellen van Dijk won the race ahead of Lizzie Armitstead and Aksana Papko.

== Final results ==
Rank	Name	Country	Sprint Number										Finish Order	Lap Points			Total Points
Rank	Name	Country	1	2	3	4	5	6	7	8	9	10	Finish Order	+	–	Balance	Total Points
	Ellen van Dijk	Netherlands			3	1	5		3				7	20		20	32
	Lizzie Armitstead	United Kingdom			1	1						5	1	20		20	27
	Aksana Papko	Belarus								2		2	3	20		20	24
4	Oxana Kozonchuk	Russia						2		1			6	20		20	23
5	Małgorzata Wojtyra	Poland			5					5	5		10				15
6	Elise van Hage	Netherlands	2				5		5		2		18				14
7	Jarmila Machačová	Czech Republic	1			5		3				3	2				12
8	Svitlana Halyuk	Ukraine	5		2	2						1	4				10
9	Alena Amialiusik	Belarus	3	2			3				1		17				9
10	Pascale Jeuland	France		1	3			1	3				11				8
11	Evgenia Romanyuta	Russia		5					2				16				7
12	Kelly Druyts	Belgium									3		14				3
13	Marta Tagliaferro	Italy		3									15				3
14	Andrea Wölfer	Switzerland							1				5				1
15	Inga Čilvinaitė	Lithuania											8				0
16	Franziska Merten	Germany											9				0
17	Pelin Cizgin	Austria											12				0
18	Doris Schweizer	Switzerland											13				0
19	Marina Romoli	Italy											19				0
20	Elodie Henriette	France											20				0
	Oksana Lyesnik	Ukraine													20	-20	DNF
	Magdalena Sara	Poland					2										DNF

DNF = did not finish

== See also ==
- 2008 European Track Championships – U23 Women's individual pursuit
- 2008 European Track Championships – U23 Women's scratch
