= 2009 UEC European Track Championships – Women's under-23 scratch =

U23 Women's scratch
2009 European Track Championships
- UEC European Champion jersey

Race details
- Dates: 19 July 2009
- Stages: 1
- Distance: 10 km (6.214 mi)

Medalists
	Gold	Anna Blyth (GBR)
	Silver	Małgorzata Wojtyra (POL)
	Bronze	Evgenia Romanyuta (RUS)

The U23 Women's scratch was one of the 8 women's under-23 events at the 2009 European Track Championships, held in Minsk, Belarus. It took place on 19 July 2009. 22 participated in the race.

Ellen van Dijk, who won the European title in 2008 and was still under-23, did not defend her title.

== Competition format ==
A scratch race is a race in which all riders start together and the object is simply to be first over the finish line after a certain number of laps. There are no intermediate points or sprints.

== Final results ==
Rank	Name	Nation	Note
1st place, gold medalist(s)	Anna Blyth	United Kingdom	
2nd place, silver medalist(s)	Małgorzata Wojtyra	Poland	
3rd place, bronze medalist(s)	Evgenia Romanyuta	Russia	
4	Pascale Jeuland	France	
5	Kelly Druyts	Belgium	
6	Alžbeta Pavlendová	Slovenia	
7	Barbara Guarischi	Italy	
8	Alena Amialiusik	Belarus	
9	Ana Usabiaga Balerdi	Spain	
10	Katarzyna Pawłowska	Poland	
11	Jolien D'Hoore	Belgium	
12	Aksana Papko	Belarus	
13	Andrea Wölfer	Switzerland	
14	Anna Nahirna	Ukraine	
15	Nathalie Lamborelle	Luxembourg	
16	Aušrinė Trebaitė	Lithuania	
17	Lisa Brennauer	Germany	
18	Marta Tagliaferro	Italy	
19	Yelena Brezhniva	Russia	
20	Alexandra Greenfield	United Kingdom	
	Laura Dittmann	Germany	DNS
	Lesya Kalytovska	Ukraine	DNS

DNS = did not start

== See also ==
- 2009 European Track Championships – U23 Women's points race
