= 2009 UEC European Track Championships – Women's under-23 points race =

U23 Women's points race
2009 European Track Championships
- UEC European Champion jersey

Race details
- Dates: 19 July 2009
- Stages: 1
- Distance: 25 km (15.53 mi)

Medalists
| | Gold | Marta Tagliaferro (ITA) |
| | Silver | Viktoriya Kondel (RUS) |
| | Bronze | Lesya Kalytovska (UKR) |

The U23 Women's points race was one of the 8 women's under-23 events at the 2009 European Track Championships, held in Minsk, Belarus. It took place on 18 July 2009. 22 participated in the race.

Ellen van Dijk, who won the European title in 2008 and was still under-23, did not defend her title.

== Final results ==
| Rank | Name | Nation | Points |
|---|---|---|---|
| 1st place, gold medalist(s) | Marta Tagliaferro | Italy | 28 |
| 2nd place, silver medalist(s) | Viktoriya Kondel | Russia | 25 |
| 3rd place, bronze medalist(s) | Lesya Kalytovska | Ukraine | 24 |
| 4 | Aušrinė Trebaitė | Lithuania | 22 |
| 5 | Pascale Jeuland | France | 12 |
| 6 | Andrea Wölfer | Switzerland | 10 |
| 7 | Kelly Druyts | Belgium | 9 |
| 8 | Małgorzata Wojtyra | Poland | 8 |
| 9 | Alena Amialiusik | Belarus | 5 |
| 10 | Alena Amialiusik | Belarus | 5 |
| 11 | Jolien D'Hoore | Belgium | 3 |
| 12 | Anna Nahirna | Ukraine | 3 |
| 13 | Franziska Merten | Germany | 3 |
| 14 | Evgenia Romanyuta | Russia | 3 |
| 15 | Alexandra Greenfield | United Kingdom | 2 |
| 16 | Katarzyna Pawłowska | Poland | 2 |
| 17 | Valentina Scandolara | Italy | 2 |
| 18 | Alžbeta Pavlendová | Slovenia | 1 |
| 19 | Ana Usabiaga Balerdi | Spain | 1 |
| 20 | Aksana Papko | Belarus | 1 |
| | Anna Blyth | United Kingdom | DNF |
| | Laura Dittmann | Germany | DNF |

DNF = did not finish

== See also ==
- 2009 European Track Championships – U23 Women's scratch
