= 2014 UEC European Track Championships – Women's scratch =

Women's scratch race at the 2014 UEC European Track Championships
- UEC European Champion jersey
- Venue: Vélodrome Amédée Détraux, Baie-Mahault
- Date: 17 October
- Competitors: 28 from 16 nations

Medalists
gold medal	Evgenia Romanyuta	Russia
silver medal	Laurie Berthon	France
bronze medal	Elena Cecchini	Italy

The Women's scratch was held on 17 October 2014.

== Results ==
Rank	Name	Nation	Laps down
1st place, gold medalist(s)	Evgenia Romanyuta	Russia	
2nd place, silver medalist(s)	Laurie Berthon	France	
3rd place, bronze medalist(s)	Elena Cecchini	Italy	
4	Pascale Jeuland	France	
5	Kelly Druyts	Belgium	
6	Małgorzata Wojtyra	Poland	
7	Shannon McCurley	Ireland	
8	Gudrun Stock	Germany	
9	Jarmila Machačová	Czech Republic	
10	Kaat Van der Meulen	Belgium	
11	Łucja Pietrzak	Poland	
12	Maryna Shmayankova	Belarus	
13	Olena Pavlukhina	Azerbaijan	
14	Irene Usabiaga	Spain	
15	Alžbeta Pavlendová	Slovakia	
16	Maria Del Mar Bonnin	Spain	
17	Marta Tereshchuk	Ukraine	
18	Stephanie Pohl	Germany	
19	Tetyana Klimchenko	Ukraine	
20	Lydia Boylan	Ireland	
21	Irina Molicheva	Russia	
22	Vaida Pikauskaitė	Lithuania	
23	Daiva Tušlaitė	Lithuania	
24	Katsiaryna Piatrouskaya	Belarus	
25	Ciara Horne	Great Britain	
26	Tatiana Guderzo	Italy	
27	Sara Ferrara	Finland	
28	Elinor Barker	Great Britain	
