= 2008 UEC European Track Championships – Women's under-23 scratch =

U23 Women's scratch
2008 European Track Championships
- UEC European Champion jersey

Race details
- Dates: 7 September 2008
- Stages: 1
- Distance: 10 km (6.2 mi)

Medalists
| | Gold | Ellen van Dijk (Netherlands) (United Kingdom) Lizzie Armitstead (Great Britain) |
| | Bronze | Evgenia Romanyuta (Russia) |

The U23 Women's scratch was one of the 8 women's under-23 events at the 2008 European Track Championships, held in Pruszków, Poland. It took place on 7 September 2008. 23 cyclists were on the start list and 22 participated in the race.

== Competition format ==
A scratch race is a race in which all riders start together and the object is simply to be first over the finish line after a certain number of laps. There are no intermediate points or sprints.

== Schedule ==
Sunday 7 September
~~10:55-11:20 Qualifying~~
14:50-15:05 Final
15:15-15:25 Victory Ceremony

== Final results ==
| Rank | Name | Nation | Note |
|---|---|---|---|
| 1st place, gold medalist(s) | Ellen van Dijk | Netherlands | 2 gold medals^{i} |
| 1st place, gold medalist(s) | Lizzie Armitstead | United Kingdom | 2 gold medals^{i} |
| 3rd place, bronze medalist(s) | Evgenia Romanyuta | Russia | |
| 4 | Elise van Hage | Netherlands | |
| 5 | Annalisa Cucinotta | Italy | |
| 6 | Alena Amialiusik | Belarus | |
| 7 | Kelly Druyts | Belgium | |
| 8 | Pascale Jeuland | France | |
| 9 | Andrea Wölfer | Switzerland | |
| 10 | Pelin Cizgin | Austria | |
| 11 | Renata Dąbrowska | Poland | |
| 12 | Małgorzata Wojtyra | Poland | |
| 13 | Oksana Liensnik | Ukraine | |
| 14 | Katie Colclough | United Kingdom | |
| 15 | Franziska Merten | Germany | |
| 16 | Marta Tagliaferro | Italy | |
| 17 | Jarmila Machačová | Czech Republic | |
| 18 | Monia Turin | Switzerland | |
| 19 | Victoria Kondel | Russia | |
| 20 | Aksana Papko | Belarus | |
| 21 | Elodie Henriette | France | |
| 22 | Inga Čilvinaitė | Lithuania | |

i) There were awarded 2 gold medals because Ellen van Dijk and Lizzie Armitstead finished at the same time. See the finishfoto.

== See also ==
- 2008 European Track Championships – U23 Women's individual pursuit
- 2008 European Track Championships – U23 Women's points race
