= Grand Prix Justiniano Hotels =

Grand Prix Justiniano Hotels is the name of two cycling races:

- Grand Prix Justiniano Hotels (men's race)
- Grand Prix Justiniano Hotels (women's race)
