= 2009–10 UCI Track Cycling World Cup Classics – Round 2 – Women's scratch race =

Round 2 Women's scratch race
2009–2010 UCI Track Cycling World Cup Classics, race 2/4

Race details
- Dates: 19 November 2009
- Stages: 1
- Distance: 10 km (6.2 mi)

Medalists
	Gold	Evgenia Romanyuta (RUS)
	Silver	Giorgia Bronzini (ITA)
	Bronze	Theresa Cliffryan (USA)

Final race

The women's scratch race during the second round of the 2009–2010 UCI Track Cycling World Cup Classics was the second women's scratch race in this season. It took place in Melbourne, Australia on 19 November 2009. Thirty-six athletes participated in the contest.

== Competition format ==
A scratch race is a race in which all riders start together and the object is simply to be first over the finish line after a certain number of laps. There are no intermediate points or sprints.

The tournament consisted of two qualifying heats of 7.5 km (30 laps). The top twelve cyclists of each heat advanced to the 10 km final (40 laps).

== Schedule ==
Thursday 19 November
17:15-17:35 Qualifying
20:45-21:05 Final
21:30-21:35 Victory Ceremony

Schedule from Tissottiming.com

== Results ==
=== Qualifying ===
Qualifying Heat 1

Rank	Cyclist	Team	Laps down	Notes
1	Min Hye Lee	South Korea'		Q
2	Xiao Juan Diao	Hong Kong	-1	Q
3	Laura Mccaughey	SAL	-1	Q
4	Marta Tagliaferro	Italy	-1	Q
5	Belinda Goss	Australia	-1	Q
6	Theresa Cliffryan	Verducci Breakaway Racing	-1	Q
7	Shelley Olds	United States	-1	Q
8	Ellen van Dijk	Netherlands	-1	Q
9	Elke Gebhardt	Germany	-1	Q
10	Ellis Lauren	New Zealand	-1	Q
11	Anna Nahirna	Ukraine	-1	Q
12	Rochelle Gilmore	Rodin	-1	Q
13	Ana Usabiaga Balerdi	EUS	-1	
14	Kelly Druyts	Belgium	-1	
15	Adriana Martinez	Mexico	-1	
16	Venera Absalyamova	Russia	-1	
17	Pascale Schnider	Switzerland	-1	
REL	Penny Day	PHN	-1	

Results from Tissottiming.com.

Qualifying Heat 2

Rank	Cyclist	Team	Laps down	Notes
1	Iryna Shpylova	Ukraine		Q
2	Jessie Daams	Belgium		Q
3	Eunmi Park	South Korea	-1	Q
4	Evgenia Romanyuta	Russia	-1	Q
5	Andrea Wölfer	Switzerland	-1	Q
6	Giorgia Bronzini	Italy	-1	Q
7	Leire Olaberria Dorronsoro	Spain	-1	Q
8	Joanne Kiesanowski	New Zealand	-1	Q
9	Dulce Pliego	Mexico	-1	Q
10	Jessie MacLean	Verducci Breakaway Racing	-1	Q
11	Lisa Brennauer	Germany	-1	Q
12	Ashlee Ankudinoff	Australia	-1	Q
13	Wan Yiu Jamie Wong	Hong Kong	-1	
14	Lauren Franges	United States	-1	
15	Skye Lee Armstrong	Rodin	-1	
16	Rosy Mccall	GIS	-1	
17	Fatehah Mustapa	Malaysia	-1	
18	Yekatsiryna Barazna	Belarus	-1	

Results from Tissottiming.com.

=== Final ===
Rank	Cyclist	Team	Notes
1st place, gold medalist(s)	Evgenia Romanyuta	Russia	
2nd place, silver medalist(s)	Giorgia Bronzini	Italy	
3rd place, bronze medalist(s)	Theresa Cliffryan	Verducci Breakaway Racing	
4	Joanne Kiesanowski	New Zealand	
5	Iryna Shpylova	Ukraine	
6	Elke Gebhardt	Germany	
7	Belinda Goss	Australia	
8	Leire Olaberria Dorronsoro	Spain	
9	Shelley Olds	United States	
10	Andrea Wölfer	Switzerland	
11	Laura Mccaughey	SAL	
12	Ashlee Ankudinoff	Australia	
13	Anna Nahirna	Ukraine	
14	Rochelle Gilmore	Rodin	
15	Ellen van Dijk	Netherlands	
16	Jessie MacLean	Verducci Breakaway Racing	
17	Jessie Daams	Belgium	
18	Lisa Brennauer	Germany	
19	Min Hye Lee	South Korea	
20	Marta Tagliaferro	Italy	
21	Ellis Lauren	New Zealand	
	Eunmi Park	South Korea	DNF
	Xiao Juan Diao	Hong Kong	DNF
	Dulce Pliego	Mexico	DNF

Results from Tissottiming.com.

== See also ==
- 2009–10 UCI Track Cycling World Cup Classics – Round 2 – Women's individual pursuit
- 2009–10 UCI Track Cycling World Cup Classics – Round 2 – Women's points race
- 2009–10 UCI Track Cycling World Cup Classics – Round 2 – Women's team pursuit
