= Chekin =

Chekin (Russian: Чекин) is a Russian masculine surname, its feminine counterpart is Chekina. It may refer to

- Alexandra Chekina (born 1993), Russian cyclist
- Chekin (Start 2018), UK
