= 2009–10 UCI Track Cycling World Cup Classics – Round 2 – Women's individual pursuit =

Round 2 Women's individual pursuit
2009–2010 UCI Track Cycling World Cup Classics, race 2/4

Race details
- Dates: 19 November 2009
- Stages: 1
- Distance: 3 km (1.864 mi)
- Winning time: 3:33.771

Medalists
	Gold	Wendy Houvenaghel (GBR)
	Silver	Alison Shanks (NZL)
	Bronze	Lesya Kalytovska (UKR)

The second round of the women's individual pursuit of the 2009–2010 UCI Track Cycling World Cup Classics took place in Melbourne, Australia on 19 November 2009. 16 athletes participated in the contest

== Competition format ==
The women's individual pursuit consists of a 3 km time trial race between two riders, starting on opposite sides of the track. If one rider catches the other, the race is over.

The tournament consisted of an initial qualifying round. The top two riders in the qualifying round advanced to the gold medal match and the third and fourth riders advanced to the bronze medal race.

== Schedule ==
Thursday 19 November
16:15-17:15 Qualifying
20:15-20:30 Finals
20:40-20:45 Victory Ceremony

Schedule from Tissottiming.com

== Results ==
=== Qualifying ===
Rank	Cyclist	Country	Result	Notes
1	Wendy Houvenaghel	United Kingdom	3:34.156	Q
2	Alison Shanks	New Zealand	3:34.225	Q
3	Lesya Kalytovska	Ukraine	3:38.451	q
4	Josephine Tomic	Australia	3:42.011	q
5	Ellen van Dijk	Netherlands	3:42.358	
6	Aušrinė Trebaitė	Lithuania	3:44.607	
7	Madeleine Sandig	Germany	3:44.941	
8	Pascale Schinder	Switzerland	3:47.835	
9	Jolien D'Hoore	Belgium	3:48.515	
10	Kimberly Geist	United States	3:50.528	
11	Helen Kelly	Rodin	3:50.625	
12	Victoria Kondel	Russia	3:51.887	
13	Min Hye Lee	South Korea	3:52.570	
14	Wan Yiu Jamie Wong	Belgium	3:59.669	
15	Adriana Martinez	Mexico	4:16.749	
	Leire Olaberria Dorronsoro	Spain		DSQ

Results from Tissottiming.com.

=== Finals ===
==== Final bronze medal race ====
Rank	Cyclist	Country	Result	Notes
3rd place, bronze medalist(s)	Lesya Kalytovska	Ukraine	3:38.047	
4	Josephine Tomic	Australia	3:42.056	

==== Final gold medal race ====
Rank	Cyclist	Country	Result	Notes
1st place, gold medalist(s)	Wendy Houvenaghel	United Kingdom	3:33.771	
2nd place, silver medalist(s)	Alison Shanks	New Zealand	3:34.133	

Results from Tissottiming.com.

== World Cup Standings ==
General standings after 2 of 4 2009–2010 World Cup races.

Rank	Cyclist	Team	Round 1	Round 2	Total points
1	Wendy Houvenaghel	United Kingdom	12	12	24
2	Josephine Tomic	Australia	10	7	17
3	Alison Shanks	New Zealand		10	10
4	Aušrinė Trebaitė	Lithuania	4	5	9
5	Lesya Kalytovska	Ukraine		8	8
6	Vera Koedooder	Netherlands	8		8
7	Leire Olaberria Dorronsoro	Spain	7		7
8	Ellen van Dijk	Netherlands		6	6
9	Lada Kozlíková	Czech Republic	6		6
10	Verena Joos	Germany	5		5
11	Madeleine Sandig	Germany		4	4
12	Pascale Schnider	Switzerland		3	3
13	Elissavet Chantzi	Greece	3		3
14	Jolien D'Hoore	Belgium		2	2
15	Victoria Kondel	Russia	2		2
16	Kimberly Geist	United States		1	1
17	Edyta Jasińska	Poland	1		1

Results from Tissottiming.com.

== See also ==
- 2009–10 UCI Track Cycling World Cup Classics – Round 2 – Women's points race
- 2009–10 UCI Track Cycling World Cup Classics – Round 2 – Women's scratch race
- 2009–10 UCI Track Cycling World Cup Classics – Round 2 – Women's team pursuit
- UCI Track Cycling World Cup Classics – Women's individual pursuit
