= 2014 UEC European Track Championships – Women's team pursuit =

Women's team pursuit at the 2014 UEC European Track Championships
- UEC European Champion jersey
- Venue: Vélodrome Amédée Détraux, Baie-Mahault
- Date: 15–16 October
- Competitors: 56 from 12 nations

Medalists
| gold medal | Katie Archibald; Elinor Barker; Ciara Horne; Laura Trott; Joanna Rowsell | Great Britain |
| silver medal | Tamara Balabolina; Irina Molicheva; Aleksandra Goncharova; Evgenia Romanyuta; Alexandra Chekina | Russia |
| bronze medal | Simona Frapporti; Beatrice Bartelloni; Tatiana Guderzo; Silvia Valsecchi; Elena Cecchini; Maria Giulia Confalonieri | Italy |

The Women's team pursuit was held on 15–16 October 2014.

== Results ==
=== Qualifying ===
The fastest 8 teams qualify for the first round, from which the top 4 remain in contention for the gold medal final and the other 4 for the bronze medal final.

| Rank | Name | Nation | Time | Notes |
|---|---|---|---|---|
| 1 | Katie Archibald; Elinor Barker; Joanna Rowsell; Laura Trott | Great Britain | 4:40.289 | Q |
| 2 | Tamara Balabolina; Alexandra Chekina; Aleksandra Goncharova; Evgenia Romanyuta | Russia | 4:44.000 | Q |
| 3 | Vaida Pikauskaitė; Vilija Sereikaitė; Aušrinė Trebaitė; Daiva Tušlaitė | Lithuania | 4:46.703 | Q |
| 4 | Charlotte Becker; Mieke Kröger; Stephanie Pohl; Gudrun Stock | Germany | 4:47.279 | Q |
| 5 | Elena Cecchini; Beatrice Bartelloni; Tatiana Guderzo; Silvia Valsecchi | Italy | 4:48.119 | q |
| 6 | Eugenia Bujak; Edyta Jasińska; Natalia Rutkowska; Małgorzata Wojtyra | Poland | 4:48.526 | q |
| 7 | Coralie Demay; Fiona Dutriaux; Roxane Fournier; Pascale Jeuland | France | 4:49.243 | q |
| 8 | Lydia Boylan; Lauren Creamer; Caroline Ryan; Melanie Späth | Ireland | 4:52.221 | q |
| 9 | Katsiaryna Piatrouskaya; Palina Pivavarava; Ina Savenka; Maryna Shmayankova | Belarus | 4:52.399 | |
| 10 | Olena Demydova; Tetyana Klimchenko; Inna Metalnikova; Marta Tereshchuk | Ukraine | 4:55.256 | |
| 11 | Kelly Druyts; Lotte Kopecky; Saartje Vandenbroucke; Kaat Van der Meulen | Belgium | 4:56.309 | |
| 12 | Maria Del Mar Bonnin; Gloria Rodríguez; Irene Usabiaga; Ana Usabiaga | Spain | 5:01.983 | |

- Q = qualified; in contention for gold medal final
- q = qualified; in contention for bronze medal final

=== First round ===
First round heats are held as follows:
Heat 1: 6th v 7th qualifier
Heat 2: 5th v 8th qualifier
Heat 3: 2nd v 3rd qualifier
Heat 4: 1st v 4th qualifier

The winners of heats 3 and 4 proceed to the gold medal final. The remaining 6 teams are ranked on time, then proceed to the finals for bronze, 5th or 7th place.

| Rank | Heat | Name | Nation | Time | Notes |
|---|---|---|---|---|---|
| 1 | 4 | Katie Archibald; Elinor Barker; Ciara Horne; Laura Trott | Great Britain | 4:46.322 | QG |
| 2 | 3 | Tamara Balabolina; Alexandra Chekina; Aleksandra Goncharova; Evgenia Romanyuta | Russia | 4:51.722 | QG |
| 3 | 1 | Eugenia Bujak; Edyta Jasińska; Natalia Rutkowska; Małgorzata Wojtyra | Poland | 4:48.695 | QB |
| 4 | 2 | Maria Giulia Confalonieri; Beatrice Bartelloni; Tatiana Guderzo; Silvia Valsecchi | Italy | 4:49.077 | QB |
| 5 | 4 | Charlotte Becker; Mieke Kröger; Stephanie Pohl; Gudrun Stock | Germany | 4:51.099 | Q5 |
| 6 | 1 | Coralie Demay; Fiona Dutriaux; Roxane Fournier; Pascale Jeuland | France | 4:52.024 | Q5 |
| 7 | 3 | Vaida Pikauskaitė; Vilija Sereikaitė; Aušrinė Trebaitė; Edita Mazurevičiūtė | Lithuania | 4:53.633 | Q7 |
| 8 | 2 | Lydia Boylan; Lauren Creamer; Caroline Ryan; Melanie Späth | Ireland | 4:58.448 | Q7 |

- QG = qualified for gold medal final
- QB = qualified for bronze medal final
- Q5 = qualified for 5th place final
- Q7 = qualified for 7th place final

=== Finals ===
The final classification is determined in the ranking finals.

| Rank | Name | Nation | Time | Notes |
|---|---|---|---|---|
Final for 7th place
| 7 | Vaida Pikauskaitė; Vilija Sereikaitė; Aušrinė Trebaitė; Edita Mazurevičiūtė | Lithuania | 4:44.464 | |
| 8 | Lydia Boylan; Lauren Creamer; Caroline Ryan; Melanie Späth | Ireland | 4:50.218 | |
Final for 5th place
| 5 | Charlotte Becker; Anna Knauer; Stephanie Pohl; Gudrun Stock | Germany | 4:42.786 | |
| 6 | Coralie Demay; Margot Dutour; Roxane Fournier; Pascale Jeuland | France | 4:51.649 | |
Bronze medal final
| 3rd place, bronze medalist(s) | Simona Frapporti; Beatrice Bartelloni; Tatiana Guderzo; Silvia Valsecchi | Italy | 4:42.018 | |
| 4 | Eugenia Bujak; Łucja Pietrzak; Natalia Rutkowska; Małgorzata Wojtyra | Poland | 4:43.857 | |
Gold medal final
| 1st place, gold medalist(s) | Katie Archibald; Elinor Barker; Ciara Horne; Laura Trott | Great Britain | 4:38.391 | |
| 2nd place, silver medalist(s) | Tamara Balabolina; Irina Molicheva; Aleksandra Goncharova; Evgenia Romanyuta | Russia | 4:45.364 | |
