= Aleksandra Goncharova (cyclist) =

Russian cyclist

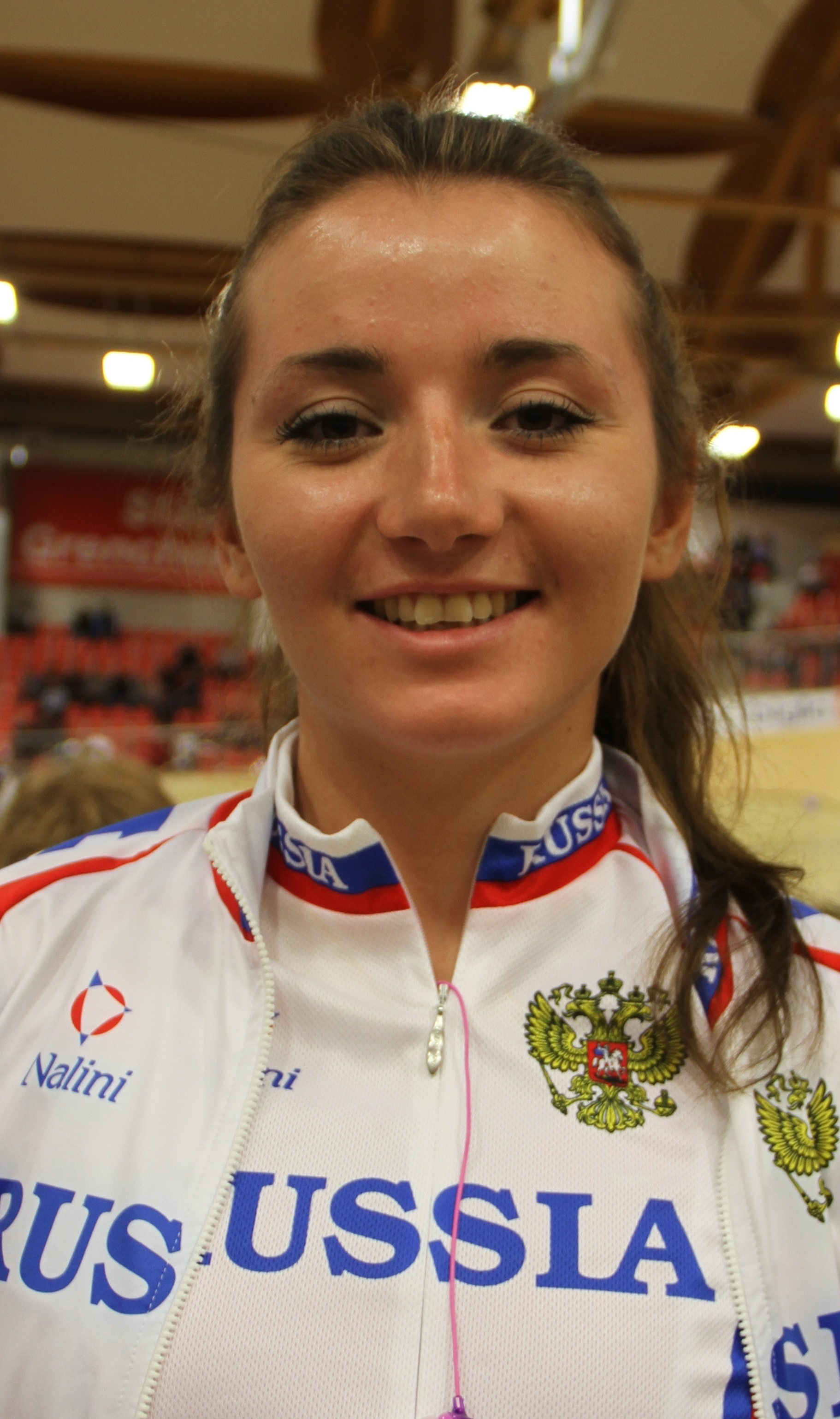
- Goncharova at the 2015 UEC European Track Championships

Personal information
- Full name: Aleksandra Goncharova
- Born: 26 October 1992 (age 33) Omsk, Russia

Cycling career
- Sport: Cycling
- Disciplines: Road; Track
- Role: Sprinter

Professional teams
- 2012: RusVelo
- 2019: Servetto–Piumate–Beltrami TSA
Medal record
Representing Russia
European Track Championships
Silver medal – second place	2014 Guadeloupe	Team pursuit
Silver medal – second place	2015 Grenchen	Team pursuit

Aleksandra Goncharova (born 26 October 1992) is a Russian road and track cyclist, who last rode for UCI Women's Team Servetto–Piumate–Beltrami TSA. After finishing 11th in 2011, she won in both at the 2014 UEC European Track Championships and 2015 UEC European Track Championships the silver medal in the team pursuit.

== Career results ==
2011
3rd Team pursuit, UEC European Under-23 Track Championships (with Elena Lichmanova and Lidia Malakhova)
2014
UEC European Under-23 Track Championships

1st Team pursuit (with Tamara Balabolina, Alexandra Chekina and Gulnaz Badykova)
2nd Individual pursuit
2nd Scratch

2nd Team pursuit, UEC European Track Championships (with Tamara Balabolina, Alexandra Chekina, Irina Molicheva and Evgenia Romanyuta)
2015
2nd Team pursuit, UEC European Track Championships
2nd Scratch race, Memorial of Alexander Lesnikov
2017
1st Omnium, Grand Prix Minsk
3rd Omnium, Grand Prix of Moscow
2019
1st Road race, National Road Championships
