= Beatrice Bartelloni =

Italian professional racing cyclist

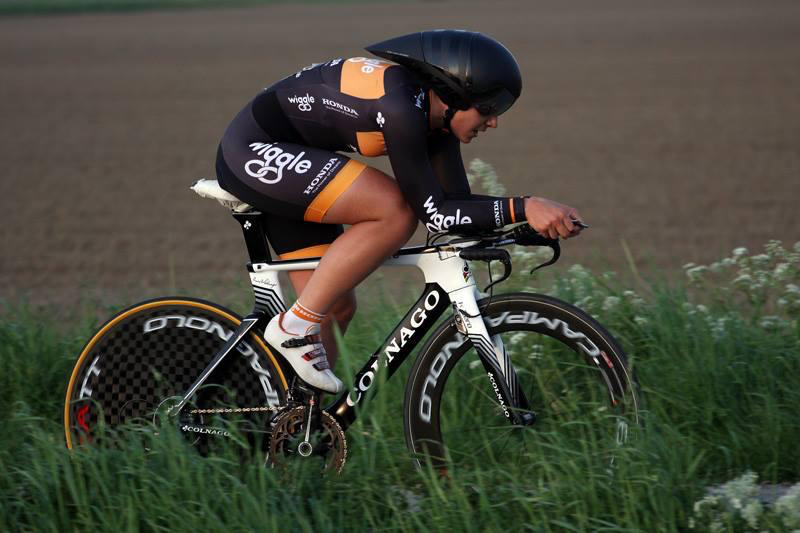

Personal information
- Full name: Beatrice Bartelloni
- Born: 5 February 1993 (age 33) Trieste, Italy

Cycling career
- Sport: Cycling
- Current team: Retired
- Disciplines: Track; Road
- Role: Rider

Amateur team
- 2018: Still Bike Team AS Dilettantistica

Professional teams
- 2013–2014: Wiggle–Honda
- 2015: Alé–Cipollini
- 2016: Aromitalia Vaiano
- 2017: Top Girls Fassa Bortolo

Beatrice Bartelloni (born 5 February 1993) is an Italian former professional racing cyclist, who rode professionally between 2013 and 2017.

== Major results ==
2009
3rd Time trial, National Novices Road Championships
2011
UEC European Junior Track Championships

1st Team pursuit (with Maria Giulia Confalonieri & Chiara Vannucci)
3rd Individual pursuit

2nd Junior Chrono Memorial Davide Fardelli
3rd Team pursuit, UCI Junior Track World Championships
8th Road race, UCI Junior Road World Championships
2012
1st Team pursuit, 2012–13 UCI Track Cycling World Cup, Cali (with Maria Giulia Confalonieri & Giulia Donato)
2013
National Track Championships

1st Team pursuit (with Elena Cecchini, Tatiana Guderzo & Marta Tagliaferro)
3rd Team sprint

1st Scratch, Copa Internacional de Pista
2nd Omnium, UIV Under-23 Talents Cup Final
3rd Team pursuit, UEC European Under-23 Track Championships (with Elena Cecchini, Maria Giulia Confalonieri and Chiara Vannucci)
3rd Scratch, 3 Jours d'Aigle
2014
2nd Diamond Tour
3rd Team pursuit, UEC European Track Championships (with Elena Cecchini, Simona Frapporti, Tatiana Guderzo and Silvia Valsecchi)
3rd Team pursuit, UEC European Under-23 Track Championships (with Elena Cecchini, Maria Giulia Confalonieri and Francesca Pattaro)
2015
1st Young rider classification Ladies Tour of Qatar
3rd Individual pursuit, 3 Jours d'Aigle
