= 2011 UCI Track Cycling World Championships – Women's points race =

Rainbow jersey

The Women's points race at the 2011 UCI Track Cycling World Championships was held on March 23. Twenty athletes participated in the contest. The distance was 100 laps (25 km) with 10 sprints.

== Results ==
The race started at 20:20.

Rank	Name	Nation	Sprint points	Lap points	Total points
1st place, gold medalist(s)	Tatsiana Sharakova	Belarus	10	20	30
2nd place, silver medalist(s)	Jarmila Machačová	Czech Republic	20	0	20
3rd place, bronze medalist(s)	Giorgia Bronzini	Italy	14	0	14
4	Minami Uwano	Japan	12	0	12
5	Yoanka González	Cuba	10	0	10
6	Cari Higgins	United States	7	0	7
7	Marianne Vos	Netherlands	7	0	7
8	María Luisa Calle	Colombia	6	0	6
9	Joanne Kiesanowski	New Zealand	6	0	6
10	Madeleine Sandig	Germany	5	0	5
11	Pascale Schnider	Switzerland	4	0	4
12	Danielys García	Venezuela	0	0	0
13	Hsiao Mei-yu	Chinese Taipei	0	0	0
14	Chanpeng Nontasin	Thailand	0	0	0
15	Jamie Wong	Hong Kong	0	0	0
16	Svetlana Pauliukaitė	Lithuania	0	0	0
–	Leire Olaberria	Spain	6	0	DNF
–	Pascale Jeuland	France	3	0	DNF
–	Sarah Kent	Australia	0	0	DNF
–	Edyta Jasińska	Poland	0	0	DNF
