= Cycling at the 2019 European Games – Women's individual pursuit =

Women's individual pursuit at the 2019 European Games
- Venue: Minsk Velodrome
- Date: 30 June
- Competitors: 13 from 9 nations
- Winning time: 3:32.045

Medalists
| gold medal | Tatsiana Sharakova | Belarus |
| silver medal | Marta Cavalli | Italy |
| bronze medal | Tamara Dronova | Russia |

The women's individual pursuit competition at the 2019 European Games was held at the Minsk Velodrome on 30 June 2019.

== Results ==
=== Qualifying ===
The first two racers raced for gold, the third and fourth fastest rider raced for the bronze medal.

| Rank | Name | Nation | Time | Behind | Notes |
|---|---|---|---|---|---|
| 1 | Tatsiana Sharakova | Belarus | 3:31.153 | | QG |
| 2 | Marta Cavalli | Italy | 3:33.166 | +2.013 | QG |
| 3 | Tamara Dronova | Russia | 3:34.840 | +3.687 | QB |
| 4 | Josie Knight | Great Britain | 3:35.514 | +4.361 | QB |
| 5 | Martina Alzini | Italy | 3:35.692 | +4.539 | |
| 6 | Justyna Kaczkowska | Poland | 3:40.320 | +9.167 | |
| 7 | Mia Griffin | Ireland | 3:40.444 | +9.291 | |
| 8 | Ina Savenka | Belarus | 3:40.556 | +9.403 | |
| 9 | Michelle Andres | Switzerland | 3:44.181 | +13.028 | |
| 10 | Oliwia Majewska | Poland | 3:44.923 | +13.770 | |
| 11 | Tereza Medveďová | Slovakia | 3:45.423 | +14.270 | |
| 12 | Hanna Solovey | Ukraine | 3:46.285 | +15.132 | |
| 13 | Anna Docherty | Great Britain | 3:52.253 | +21.100 | |

=== Finals ===
| Rank | Name | Nation | Time | Behind |
|---|---|---|---|---|
Gold medal race
| 1st place, gold medalist(s) | Tatsiana Sharakova | Belarus | 3:32.045 | |
| 2nd place, silver medalist(s) | Marta Cavalli | Italy | 3:37.489 | +5.444 |
Bronze medal race
| 3rd place, bronze medalist(s) | Tamara Dronova | Russia | 3:34.371 | |
| 4 | Josie Knight | Great Britain | 3:37.436 | +3.065 |
