= 2017 UEC European Track Championships – Women's points race =

Track cycling competition in Berlin, Germany

Women's points race at the 2017 UEC European Track Championships
- UEC European Champion jersey
- Venue: Velodrom, Berlin
- Date: 20 October
- Competitors: 18 from 18 nations

Medalists
gold medal	Trine Schmidt	Denmark
silver medal	Gulnaz Badykova	Russia
bronze medal	Tatsiana Sharakova	Belarus

The Women's points race was held on 20 October 2017. 18 riders participated over a distance of 25 km (100 laps), with sprints every 10 laps awarding 5, 3, 2 or 1 point to the first four (double in the final sprint); 20 points are also awarded/withdrawn for each lap gained/lost respectively.

== Results ==
Rank	Name	Nation	Sprint points	Lap points	Finish order	Total points
1st place, gold medalist(s)	Trine Schmidt	Denmark	22	40	16	62
2nd place, silver medalist(s)	Gulnaz Badykova	Russia	11	20	2	31
3rd place, bronze medalist(s)	Tatsiana Sharakova	Belarus	9	20	5	29
4	Anita Stenberg	Norway	9	20	9	29
5	Jarmila Machačová	Czech Republic	8	20	10	28
6	Charlotte Becker	Germany	3	20	8	23
7	Letizia Paternoster	Italy	18	0	1	18
8	Elinor Barker	Great Britain	10	0	7	10
9	Hanna Solovey	Ukraine	8	0	4	8
10	Verena Eberhardt	Austria	8	0	11	8
11	Kirsten Wild	Netherlands	5	0	3	5
12	Lydia Gurley	Ireland	5	0	14	5
13	Ane Iriarte	Spain	1	0	13	1
14	Coralie Demay	France	0	0	6	0
15	Annelies Dom	Belgium	3	–20	15	–17
16	Léna Mettraux	Switzerland	0	–20	12	–20
–	Daria Pikulik	Poland	1	0	–	DNF
–	Alžbeta Bačíková	Slovakia	0	−40	–	DNF
