= 2008 UEC European Track Championships – Women's under-23 individual pursuit =

U23 Women's individual pursuit
2008 European Track Championships
- UEC European Champion jersey

Race details
- Dates: 5–6 September 2008
- Stages: 1
- Distance: 3,000 m (9,843 ft)
- Winning time: 3:34.781

Medalists
	Gold	Vilija Sereikaitė (Lithuania)
	Silver	Ellen van Dijk (Netherlands)
	Bronze	Joanna Rowsell (Great Britain)

The U23 Women's individual pursuit was one of the 8 women's under-23 events at the 2008 European Track Championships, held in Pruszków, Poland. It took place from 5 to 6 September 2008. 17 cyclists participated in the contest.

== Competition format ==
The women's individual pursuit consists of a 3 km time trial race between two riders, starting on opposite sides of the track. If one rider catches the other, the race is over.

The tournament consisted of an initial qualifying round. The top four riders advanced to the semifinals. The winners of the semifinals advanced to the gold medal match and losers advanced to the bronze medal race.

== Schedule ==
Friday 5 September
12:08-12:58 Qualifying
Saturday 6 September
19:10-19:25 Finals
19:30:-19:35 Victory Ceremony

== Results ==
=== Qualifying ===
Rank	Name	Nation	Time	Speed	Note
1	Vilija Sereikaitė	Lithuania	3:33.766	50.522	Q
2	Ellen van Dijk	Netherlands	3:35.951	50.011	Q
3	Joanna Rowsell	United Kingdom	3:37.641	49.623	q
4	Svitlana Halyuk	Ukraine	3:42.498	48.539	q
5	Aksana Papko	Belarus	3:43.935	48.288	
6	Oxana Kozonchuk	Russia	3:45.132	47.971	
7	Jarmila Machačová	Czech Republic	3:47.209	47.533	
8	Stephanie Pohl	Germany	3:47.483	47.476	
9	Lisa Brennauer	Germany	3:48.017	47.364	
10	Edyta Jasińska	Poland	3:48.628	47.238	
11	Audrey Cordon	France	3:49.376	47.084	
12	Alena Amialyusik	Belarus	3:49.711	47.015	
13	Hannah Mayho	United Kingdom	3:50.176	46.920	
14	Viktoriya Kondel	Russia	3:51.349	46.682	
15	Oksana Lyesnik	Ukraine	3:51.543	46.643	
16	Elise van Hage	Netherlands	3:55.349	45.889	
17	Dominika Maczka	Poland	4:01.597	44.702	

=== Semifinals ===
==== Semifinal 1 ====
Rank	Name	Nation	Time	Speed	Note
1	Vilija Sereikaitė	Lithuania	3:42.052	48.637	Q
2	Svitlana Halyuk	Ukraine	3:42.052	48.637	

==== Semifinal 2 ====
Rank	Name	Nation	Time	Speed	Note
1	Ellen van Dijk	Netherlands	3:37.354	49.688	Q
2	Joanna Rowsell	United Kingdom	3:37.867	49.571	Fastest losing time

=== Final ===
Rank	Name	Nation	Time	Speed
1	Vilija Sereikaitė	Lithuania	3:34.781	50.283
2	Ellen van Dijk	Netherlands	3:37.747	49.598

== Final classification ==
Rank	Name	Nation
1st place, gold medalist(s)	Vilija Sereikaitė	Lithuania
2nd place, silver medalist(s)	Ellen van Dijk	Netherlands
3rd place, bronze medalist(s)	Joanna Rowsell	United Kingdom
4	Svitlana Halyuk	Ukraine
5	Aksana Papko	Belarus
6	Oxana Kozonchuk	Russia
7	Jarmila Machačová	Czech Republic
8	Stephanie Pohl	Germany
9	Lisa Brennauer	Germany
10	Edyta Jasińska	Poland
11	Audrey Cordon	France
12	Alena Amialyusik	Belarus
13	Hannah Mayho	United Kingdom
14	Viktoriya Kondel	Russia
15	Oksana Lyesnik	Ukraine
16	Elise van Hage	Netherlands
17	Dominika Maczka	Poland
