= 2019 UEC European Track Championships – Women's points race =

Track cycling event

Women's points race at the 2019 UEC European Track Championships
- Venue: Omnisport Apeldoorn, Apeldoorn
- Date: 19 October
- Competitors: 21 from 21 nations
- Winning points: 46

Medalists
gold medal	Maria Giulia Confalonieri	Italy
silver medal	Tatsiana Sharakova	Belarus
bronze medal	Hanna Solovey	Ukraine

The women's points race competition at the 2019 UEC European Track Championships was held on 19 October 2019.

== Results ==
100 laps (25 km) were raced with 10 sprints.

Rank	Name	Nation	Lap points	Sprint points	Finish order	Total points
1st place, gold medalist(s)	Maria Giulia Confalonieri	Italy	20	26	2	46
2nd place, silver medalist(s)	Tatsiana Sharakova	Belarus	20	24	1	44
3rd place, bronze medalist(s)	Hanna Solovey	Ukraine	20	18	3	38
4	Coralie Demay	France	20	8	5	28
5	Maria Martins	Portugal	20	7	9	27
6	Diana Klimova	Russia	20	6	21	26
7	Léna Mettraux	Switzerland	20	3	10	23
8	Trine Schmidt	Denmark	20		14	20
9	Neah Evans	Great Britain		14	4	14
10	Anita Stenberg	Norway		4	6	4
11	Karolina Karasiewicz	Poland		3	7	3
12	Amy Pieters	Netherlands		3	11	3
13	Alice Sharpe	Ireland		3	18	3
14	Irene Usabiaga	Spain			8	0
15	Verena Eberhardt	Austria			12	0
16	Jarmila Machačová	Czech Republic			13	0
17	Charlotte Becker	Germany			15	0
18	Johanna Kitti Borissza	Hungary			16	0
19	Annelies Dom	Belgium			17	0
20	Tereza Medveďová	Slovakia	–20	2	19	–18
21	Viktorija Šumskytė	Lithuania	–60		20	–60
