= Tomas Micė =

Lithuanian cyclist (born 1986)

Tomas Mice (born 22 December 1986) is a Lithuanian mountain bike and road race cyclist.

Tomas Mice competed at the UCI Road World Championships in 2008 in Varese in the U23 road race, where he finished in 74th place. The following year, he competed for the Lithuanian Team Piemonte. That season, he became the national cross-country champion and in the road race he finished in fourth place behind winner Egidijus Juodvalkis.

== Wins – mountain bike ==
2009
Lithuanian Cross-Country Champion

== Teams ==
- 2009 Team Piemonte
