= 2008 UEC European Track Championships – Women's under-23 500 m time trial =

The Women's 500 m Time Trial was one of the 8 women's events at the 2008 European Track Championships, held in Pruszków, Poland.

9 cyclists participated in the contest.

The race was held on September 6.

== Final results ==
Rank	Name	Nation	Time
1	Sandie Clair	France	33.872
2	Miriam Welte	Germany	34.376
3	Anna Blyth	United Kingdom	35.035
4	Virginie Cueff	France	35.392
5	Helena Casas Roige	Spain	35.801
6	Renata Dąbrowska	Poland	35.801
7	Gintarė Gaivenytė	Lithuania	35.801
8	Marta Janowiak	Poland	37.172
9	Angeliki Koutsonikoli	Greece	37.478
DNS	Olga Streltsova	Russia	

DNS = Did not start.
