= Grand Prix Justiniano Hotels (women's race) =

Race details
- Date: March
- Region: Turkey
- Discipline: Road
- Competition: UCI 1.2 (2019–)
- Type: One day race

History
- First edition: 2019
- Editions: 1 (as of 2019)
- First winner: Tatsiana Sharakova (BLR)
- Most wins: No repeat winners
- Most recent: Tatsiana Sharakova (BLR)

The Grand Prix Justiniano Hotels is an annual professional road bicycle race for women in Turkey.

== Winners ==
Year	Country	Rider	Team
2019	Belarus	Tatsiana Sharakova	Minsk Cycling Club
