= Dominika Mączka =

Polish cyclist

Dominika Maczka
Cycling career
- Sport: Cycling
- Discipline: Track cycling
- Role: Rider
- Rider type: endurance

Dominika Maczka is a Polish track cyclist, and part of the national team. She competed in the team pursuit event at the 2009 UCI Track Cycling World Championships.
