= Tamara Dronova =

Russian cyclist (born 1993)

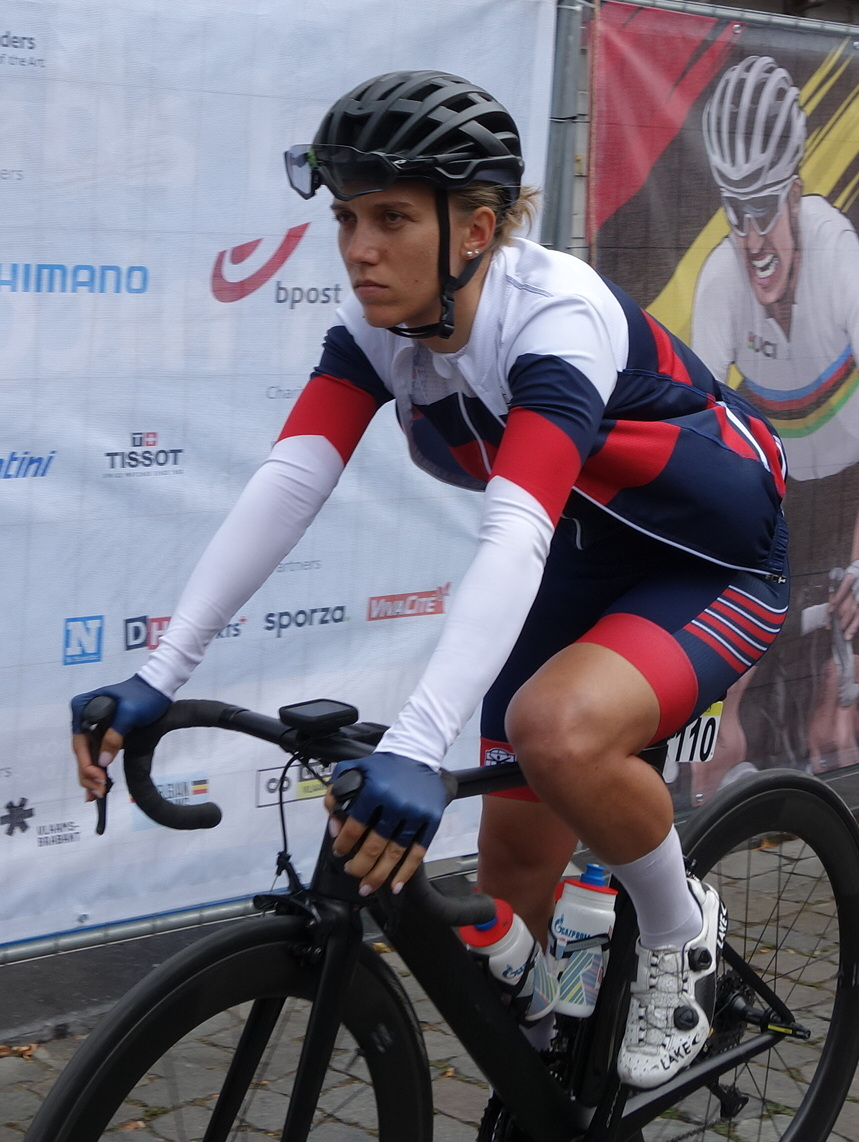
- Dronova in 2021

Personal information
- Full name: Tamara Dronova
- Born: Tamara Balabolina; 13 August 1993 (age 33) Moscow, Russia

Cycling career
- Sport: Cycling
- Current team: Marathon–Tula (track); Roland Le Dévoluy (road)
- Disciplines: Track; Road
- Role: Rider
- Rider type: Endurance

Professional teams
- 2020–: Marathon–Tula (track)
- 2021–: Cogeas–Mettler–Look (road)
Medal record
Women's track cycling
Representing Russia
European Championships
Bronze medal – third place	2014 Guadeloupe	Team pursuit
European U23 Championships
Bronze medal – third place	2012 Anadia	Omnium
Gold medal – first place	2014 Anadia	Scratch
Gold medal – first place	2014 Anadia	Team pursuit
Gold medal – first place	2014 Anadia	Omnium
European Games
Bronze medal – third place	2019 Minsk	Individual pursuit

Tamara Dronova (Russian: Тамара Дронова, née Balabolina; born 13 August 1993) is a Russian track and road racing cyclist, who currently rides for UCI Women's WorldTeam Roland Le Dévoluy in road racing, and UCI Track Team Marathon-Tula in track cycling. After winning several medals as a junior and under-23 at the European Track Championships she won as an elite rider the bronze medal in the team pursuit at the 2014 UEC European Track Championships. Besides track cycling she also rides on the road and competed in 2013 at the Russian National Road Race Championships and Russian National Time Trial Championships.

As of October 31, 2014 she is still the current Russian national track cycling record holder in the 4000m team pursuit in a time of 4:29.842 ridden at the 2013–14 UCI Track Cycling World Cup race in Aguascalientes on December 5, 2013 together with Anastasia Chulkova, Alexandra Chekina, and Galina Strelsova.

== Major results ==
=== Track ===
2011
UEC European Junior Track Championships

1st Team sprint (with Anastasia Voynova)
3rd Sprint

2012
1st Omnium, UEC European Under-23 Track Championships
3rd Omnium, UEC European Track Championships
3rd Omnium, 2012–13 UCI Track Cycling World Cup, Glasgow
2013
National Track Championships

1st Team pursuit (with Alexandra Chekina, Aleksandra Goncharova and Maria Mishina)
2nd Omnium

2014
European Under-23 Track Championships

1st Omnium
1st Scratch
1st Team pursuit (with Alexandra Chekina, Aleksandra Goncharova and Gulnaz Badykova)

2nd Team pursuit, UEC European Track Championships (with Alexandra Chekina, Irina Molicheva, Aleksandra Goncharova and Evgenia Romanyuta)
2015
Memorial of Alexander Lesnikov

1st Omnium
1st Scratch

6 giorni delle rose – Fiorenzuola

1st Omnium
2nd Scratch

2nd Team pursuit, UEC European Track Championships (with Gulnaz Badykova, Alexandra Chekina and Maria Savitskaya)
UEC European Under-23 Track Championships

2nd Omnium
3rd Team pursuit (with Gulnaz Badykova, Alexandra Chekina and Natalia Mozharova)

2016
2nd Points race, Memorial of Alexander Lesnikov
2017
3rd Madison, Grand Prix Minsk (with Gulnaz Badykova)
3rd Madison, Grand Prix of Moscow (with Gulnaz Badykova)
2019
3rd Individual pursuit, European Games
2021
National Track Championships

1st Individual pursuit
2nd Madison (with Diana Klimova)
2nd Team pursuit

=== Road ===
2015
3rd Time trial, National Road Championships
2020
1st Grand Prix Central Anatolia
3rd Time trial, National Road Championships
5th Grand Prix Mount Erciyes
6th Grand Prix Gazipaşa
7th Grand Prix Cappadocia
2021
National Road Championships

1st Time trial
3rd Road race

4th Grand Prix Velo Manavgat
5th Grand Prix Velo Erciyes
8th Grand Prix Develi
2022
National Road Championships

1st Time trial
1st Road race
1st Mixed team relay

4th Overall Tour of Scandinavia
6th Postnord Vårgårda WestSweden RR
7th GP de Plouay
8th Gent–Wevelgem
2023
2nd Clasica Femenina Navarra
3rd Overall Vuelta a Andalucía

1st Points classification
1st Stages 1 & 2

6th Women Cycling Pro Costa De Almería
6th Tre Valli Varesine
7th Overall Vuelta a Burgos Feminas
10th Trofeo Oro in Euro
10th Ronde de Mouscron
2024
National Road Championships

2nd Time trial
3rd Mixed team relay
4th Road race

2nd Grand Prix El Salvador
2nd Overall Tour El Salvador

1st Stages 3 & 4

2nd Grand Prix MOPT (ITT)
3rd Grand Prix Presidente
5th Tour of Guangxi
8th Tour of Chongming Island
10th Overall Internationale LOTTO Thüringen Ladies Tour
