= Lidia Malakhova =

Russian track cyclist

Personal information
- Born: 13 July 1991 (age 35)

Cycling career
- Sport: Cycling
- Discipline: Track cycling
- Role: Rider
- Rider type: team pursuit

Lidia Malakhova (Russian: Лидия Малахова; born 13 July 1991) is a Russian female track cyclist. She competed in the team pursuit event at the 2014 UCI Track Cycling World Championships.

== Career results ==
2011
3rd Team Pursuit, UEC European U23 Track Championships (with Elena Lichmanova and Alexandra Goncharova)
2012
1st Team Pursuit, UEC European U23 Track Championships (with Elena Lichmanova and Galina Streltsova)
2014
2nd Points Race, Memorial of Alexander Lesnikov
2015
3rd Omnium, Memorial of Alexander Lesnikov
2016
Memorial of Alexander Lesnikov
1st Points Race

2nd Scratch Race
