= Tatsiana Sharakova =

Belarusian racing cyclist (born 1984)

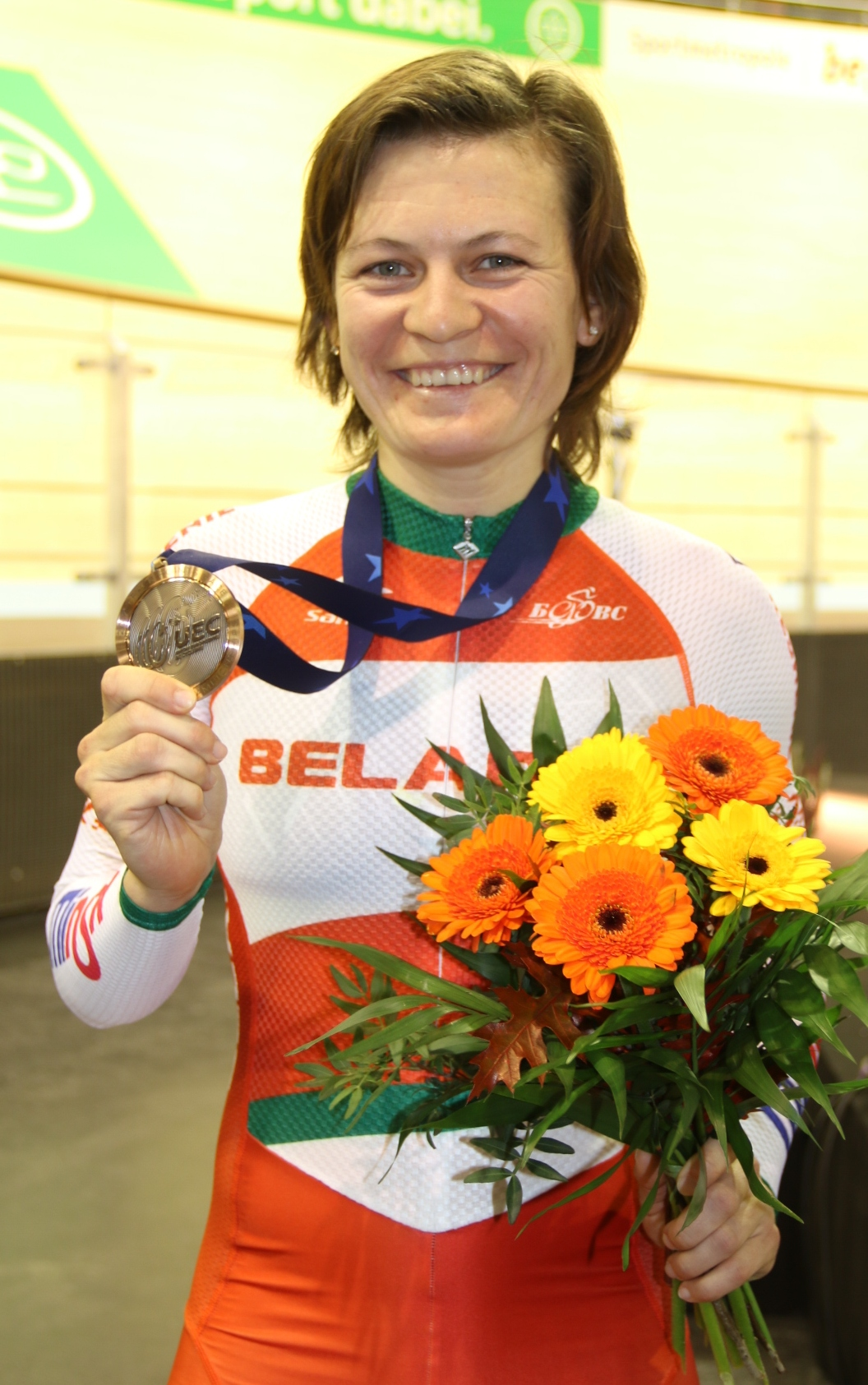
- Sharakova at the 2017 UEC European Track Championships

Personal information
- Full name: Tatsiana Valerevna Sharakova; Belarusian: Таццяна Валер'еўна Шаракова
- Born: 31 July 1984 (age 42) Orsha, Byelorussian SSR, Soviet Union (now Belarus)

Cycling career
- Sport: Cycling
- Disciplines: Road; Track
- Role: Rider

Amateur team
- 2022–: Minsk Cycling Club

Professional teams
- 2005–2006: USC Chirio Forno d'Asolo
- 2007: A.S. Team F.R.W.
- 2008: Gauss RDZ Ormu
- 2017–2022: Minsk Cycling Club
Medal record
Representing Belarus
Women's road cycling
European Games
Bronze medal – third place	2019 Minsk	Road race
Women's track cycling
World Championships
Gold medal – first place	2011 Apeldoorn	Points race
Bronze medal – third place	2010 Ballerup	Points race
European Games
Gold medal – first place	2019 Minsk	Individual pursuit
European Championships
Silver medal – second place	2010 Pruszków	Omnium
Silver medal – second place	2011 Apeldoorn	Omnium
Silver medal – second place	2019 Apeldoorn	Points race
Bronze medal – third place	2011 Apeldoorn	Team pursuit
Bronze medal – third place	2017 Berlin	Points race
Bronze medal – third place	2019 Apeldoorn	Omnium
Disqualified	2012 Panevėžys	Omnium
Disqualified	2012 Panevėžys	Team pursuit

Tatsiana Valerevna Sharakova (Belarusian: Таццяна Валер'еўна Шаракова; born 31 July 1984) is a Belarusian racing cyclist, who rode for Belarusian amateur team Minsk Cycling Club. She competed at the 2012 Summer Olympics on the track in the women's team pursuit for the national team.

== Doping ==
Sharakova tested positive for Tuaminoheptane at the 2012 UEC European Track Championships and received an 18-month doping suspension.

== Major results ==
=== Road ===
2002
9th Tour de Berne
2003
2nd Road race, National Road Championships
2004
2nd Road race, National Road Championships
10th Gran Premio Brissago Lago Maggiore
2005
National Road Championships

1st Road race
1st Time trial

2006
3rd Overall Grande Boucle Féminine Internationale

1st Young rider classification

2007
National Road Championships

1st Road race
1st Time trial

2008
National Road Championships

1st Road race
1st Time trial

4th Overall Tour de Bretagne Féminin

1st Stage 4b

2009
National Road Championships

1st Road race
1st Time trial

2011
National Road Championships

2nd Road race
2nd Time trial

2012
1st Road race, National Road Championships
2015
National Road Championships

2nd Road race
2nd Time trial

2016
National Road Championships

1st Road race
1st Time trial

2017
National Road Championships

1st Road race
1st Time trial

4th VR Women ITT
8th Overall Tour of Zhoushan Island
2019
National Road Championships

1st Road race
1st Time trial

1st Grand Prix Alanya
1st Grand Prix Justiniano Hotels
European Games

3rd Road race
10th Time trial

5th VR Women ITT
7th Overall Tour of Chongming Island
2020
National Road Championships

1st Road race
1st Time trial

2nd Overall Dubai Women's Tour

1st Stage 3

5th Grand Prix Alanya
2021
National Road Championships

1st Road race
1st Time trial

1st Grand Prix Velo Manavgat

=== Track ===
2004
UEC European Under-23 Track Championships

2nd Individual pursuit
3rd Points race

2005
1st Individual pursuit, UEC European Under-23 Track Championships
3rd Individual pursuit, 2004–05 UCI Track Cycling World Cup Classics, Sydney
2006
UEC European Under-23 Track Championships

1st Individual pursuit
3rd Scratch

2009
1st Scratch, 2009–10 UCI Track Cycling World Cup Classics, Cali
2010
2nd Omnium, UEC European Track Championships
3rd Points race, UCI Track World Championships
3rd Omnium, 2010–11 UCI Track Cycling World Cup Classics, Cali
2011
1st Points race, UCI Track World Championships
UEC European Track Championships

2nd Omnium
3rd Team pursuit

2012
2nd Team pursuit, 2011–12 UCI Track Cycling World Cup, Beijing
3rd Team pursuit, UEC European Track Championships
3rd Team pursuit, 2012–13 UCI Track Cycling World Cup, Glasgow
2014
1st Omnium, Grand Prix Minsk
2nd Omnium, GP Prostejov – Memorial of Otmar Malecek
3rd Omnium, Cottbuser Nächte
2015
Panevėžys

1st Individual pursuit
1st Omnium

1st Omnium, Grand Prix Minsk
2016
1st Omnium, Grand Prix Minsk
Memorial of Alexander Lesnikov

1st Scratch
3rd Points race

2016–17 UCI Track Cycling World Cup, Glasgow
3rd Individual pursuit
3rd Omnium
2017
2nd Points race, Grand Prix Minsk
2nd Omnium, International track race – Panevežys
3rd Points race, UEC European Track Championships
2019
1st Individual pursuit, European Games
UEC European Track Championships

2nd Points race
3rd Omnium

3rd Points race, 2019–20 UCI Track Cycling World Cup, Minsk
2020
National Track Championships

1st Madison (with Nastassia Kiptsikava)
1st Omnium
