= GP Liberazione =

Race details
- Date: April
- Region: Italy
- Discipline: Road

History
- First edition: 1989
- Editions: 24
- Final edition: 2012
- First winner: Greta Zocca (ITA)
- Most wins: Giorgia Bronzini (ITA) (3 wins)
- Final winner: Noemi Cantele (ITA)

The GP Liberazione is an elite women's road bicycle race held in the Italy. It is rated by the UCI as a 1.2 category race.

== Past winners ==
Year	Country	Rider	Team
2000	Italy	Greta Zocca	
2001	Italy	Greta Zocca	
2002	Brazil	Cremilda Fernandes	
2003	Lithuania	Diana Ziliute	
2004	Russia	Olga Slyusareva	
2005	Germany	Regina Schleicher	
2006	Lithuania	Diana Ziliute	
2007	Italy	Giorgia Bronzini	
2008	Germany	Regina Schleicher	
2009	Italy	Giorgia Bronzini	
2010	Italy	Monia Baccaille	
2011	Italy	Giorgia Bronzini	
2012	Italy	Noemi Cantele	
