= Giorgia Bronzini =

Italian cyclist (born 1983)

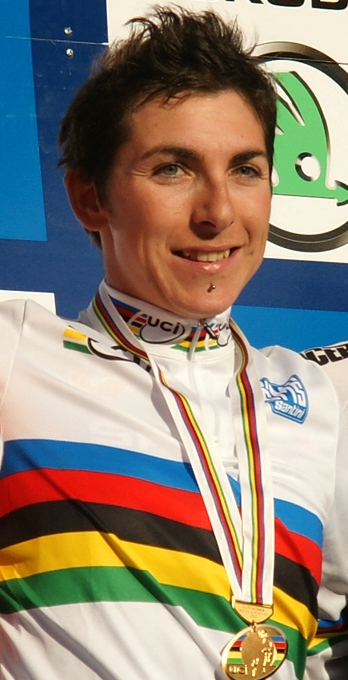
- Bronzini at the 2011 UCI Road World Championships

Personal information
- Born: 3 August 1983 (age 43) Piacenza, Italy

Cycling career
- Sport: Cycling
- Disciplines: Road; Track
- Role: Rider (retired); Directeur sportif
- Rider type: Sprinter

Professional teams
- 2003–2004: Acca Due O–Pasta Zara–Lorena Camicie
- 2005: USC Chirio Forno d'Asolo
- 2006: A.S. Team FRW
- 2007: Safi–Pasta Zara–Manhattan
- 2008: Titanedi-Frezza Acca Due O
- 2009: Safi–Pasta Zara–Titanedi
- 2010: Gauss Rdz Ormu
- 2011: Forno d'Asolo – Colavita
- 2012: Diadora–Pasta Zara
- 2013–2017: Wiggle–Honda
- 2018: Cylance Pro Cycling

Managerial teams
- 2019–2021: Trek–Segafredo
- 2022–2023: Liv Racing TeqFind
- 2024-: Human Powered Health

Major wins
- Road Major Tours Giro d'Italia Points classification (2005) 8 individual stages (2005, 2007, 2013, 2014, 2016) One-day races and Classics World Road Race Championships (2010, 2011) Track World Championships Points race (2009)
Medal record
Representing Italy
Women's track cycling
World Championships
Gold medal – first place	2009 Pruszków	Points race
Bronze medal – third place	2011 Apeldoorn	Points race
Bronze medal – third place	2013 Minsk	Points race
European Championships
Gold medal – first place	2003 Moscow	Under-23 points race
Silver medal – second place	2002 Büttgen	Under-23 points race
Silver medal – second place	2005 Fiorenzuola	Under-23 points race
Bronze medal – third place	2003 Moscow	Under-23 scratch race
Women's road bicycle racing
UCI Road World Championships
Gold medal – first place	2010 Melbourne	Road race
Gold medal – first place	2011 Copenhagen	Road race
Bronze medal – third place	2007 Stuttgart	Road race

Giorgia Bronzini (born 3 August 1983) is an Italian former professional racing cyclist, who rode professionally between 2003 and 2017. She won the women's road race in the UCI Road World Championships in 2010 and 2011 and the women's points race in the UCI Track Cycling World Championships in 2009.

Born in Piacenza, Bronzini took a total of 80 victories on the road and the track, including stages of the Giro d'Italia Femminile, La Route de France, the Tour of Qatar, the Tour of California, and the Tour of Chongming Island. After a 16-year career, in August 2018 Bronzini announced that she would retire at the end of the season and become a directeur sportif with Trek Bicycle Corporation's new women's team, Trek–Segafredo in 2019. She remained with the team until the end of the 2021 season, when she joined Liv Racing Xstra in a similar role.

== Major results ==
=== Track ===
2001
1st Points race, UEC European Junior Championships
1st Points race, UCI World Junior Championships
2002
2nd Points race, UEC European Under-23 Championships
2003
UEC European Under-23 Championships

1st Points race
3rd Scratch

2005
2nd Points race, UEC European Under-23 Championships
2009
1st Points race, UCI World Championships
UCI World Cup Classics

1st Points race, Melbourne
1st Points race, Cali
2nd Scratch, Melbourne
2nd Scratch, Cali

2010
3rd Points race, UCI World Cup Classics, Beijing
2011
2nd Scratch, National Championships
2013
National Championships

1st Keirin
2nd Sprint
2nd Team sprint

3rd Points race, UCI World Championships
2014
International Belgian Open

1st Scratch
3rd Points race

3rd Points race, Revolution Series, Manchester
2015
1st Points race, 6 giorni delle rose - Fiorenzuola
2017
Belgian International Meeting

2nd Scratch
3rd Points race

=== Road ===
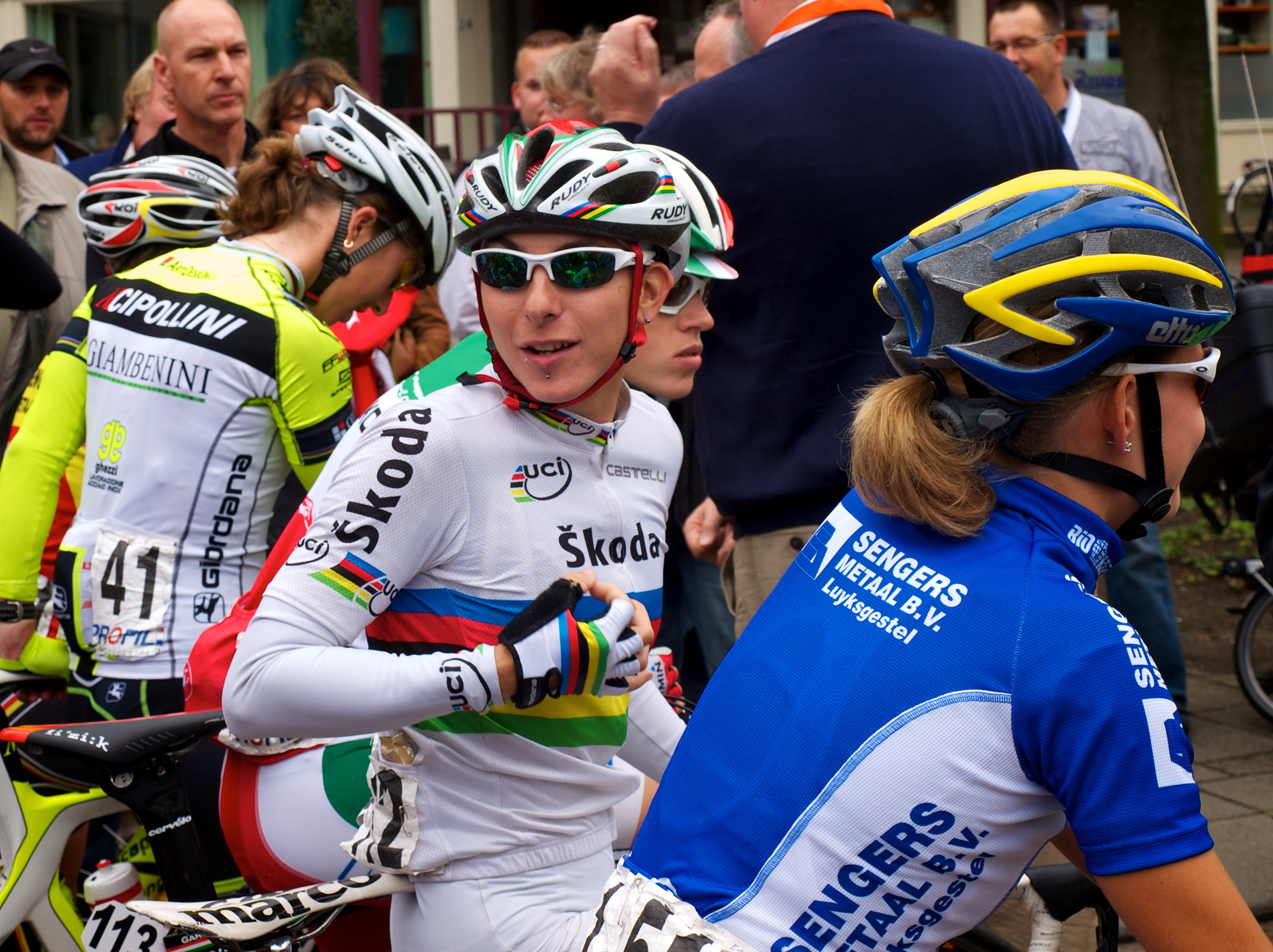
Bronzini (centre) at the 2011 Holland Ladies Tour

2001
5th Road race, UCI World Junior Championships
2003
3rd GP Carnevale d'Europa
2004
1st Stage 1 Damesronde van Drenthe
Eko Tour Dookola Polski

1st Stages 1, 2 & 4

1st Stage 6 Holland Ladies Tour
4th GP Liberazione
10th Rotterdam Tour
2005
1st Giro del Lago Maggiore
1st Giro del Friuli
1st Rund um die Nürnberger Altstadt
Giro del Trentino Alto Adige-Südtirol

1st Stages 1 & 3

Giro d'Italia Femminile

1st Stages 3, 6 & 9

Giro della Toscana Int. Femminile – Memorial Michela Fanini

1st Stages 3a & 5

3rd GP Liberazione
5th Tour of Flanders
6th Road race, UCI World Championships
2006
1st Stage 2b Giro della Toscana Int. Femminile – Memorial Michela Fanini
1st Points classification Holland Ladies Tour
2nd Trofeo Riviera Della Versilia
2nd GP de Plouay – Bretagne
3rd Rund um die Nürnberger Altstadt
6th Overall Trophée d'Or Féminin

1st Stage 2

2007
1st Grand Prix de Dottignies
1st Novilon Internationale Damesronde van Drenthe
1st GP Liberazione
1st Stage 1 Giro d'Italia Femminile
1st Stage 4a Giro della Toscana Int. Femminile – Memorial Michela Fanini
Tour de PEI

1st Stages 3 & 5

2nd Trofeo Alfredo Binda-Comune di Cittiglio
3rd Road race, UCI Road World Championships
3rd Road race, National Road Championships
3rd Overall Trophée d'Or Féminin

1st Stages 3 & 6

3rd Drentse 8 van Dwingeloo
5th GP de Plouay – Bretagne
8th Ronde van Drenthe
10th Overall Tour du Grand Montréal
2008
1st Züri-Metzgete
1st Stage 7 La Route de France
3rd Road race, National Road Championships
3rd GP Liberazione
4th Grand Prix de Dottignies
5th Overall Trophée d'Or Féminin

1st Stages 1, 2, 3 & 4

9th Overall Tour de Pologne Feminin

1st Stages 2 & 3

2009
1st Overall Gran Caracol de Pista

1st Stages 1, 2, 4, 8 & 9

1st GP Carnevale d'Europa
1st GP Liberazione
Tour de PEI

1st Stages 1, 3 & 4

1st Stage 2 Giro della Toscana Int. Femminile – Memorial Michela Fanini
2nd Overall Ladies Tour of Qatar

1st Stages 1 & 3

3rd Road race, Mediterranean Games
3rd Road race, National Road Championships
2010
1st Road race, UCI Road World Championships
1st GP Carnevale d'Europa
Giro della Toscana Int. Femminile – Memorial Michela Fanini

1st Stages 2 & 6

2nd Overall Ladies Tour of Qatar

1st Stage 2

2nd Grand Prix de Dottignies
2nd GP Liberazione
3rd Ronde van Drenthe
4th Drentse 8 van Dwingeloo
5th GP Ciudad de Valladolid
2011
1st Road race, UCI Road World Championships
1st GP Liberazione
1st Grand Prix Cycliste de Gatineau
1st Liberty Classic
3rd Ronde van Drenthe
3rd GP Carnevale d'Europa
4th Ronde van Gelderland
6th Drentse 8 van Dwingeloo
8th Sparkassen Giro
9th Overall Ladies Tour of Qatar
9th Tour of Chongming Island World Cup
10th Overall Holland Ladies Tour
2012
Giro della Toscana Int. Femminile – Memorial Michela Fanini

1st Stages 1 & 4

2nd Drentse 8 van Dwingeloo
3rd Liberty Classic
4th Ronde van Drenthe
4th Classica Citta di Padova
5th Road race, Olympic Games
9th Overall Trophée d'Or Féminin

1st Stages 4, 5 & 6

10th Overall Holland Ladies Tour
2013
1st Overall Tour of Zhoushan Island

1st Stage 1

1st Classica Citta di Padova
1st Knokke-Heist – Bredene
1st Stage 2 Giro d'Italia Femminile
La Route de France

1st Stages 1, 2, 3, 4, 5 & 6

Tour Cycliste Féminin International de l'Ardèche

1st Points classification
1st Stages 1, 3 & 6

1st Stage 1 Giro della Toscana Int. Femminile – Memorial Michela Fanini
2nd Road race, National Road Championships
2nd Overall Grand Prix Elsy Jacobs

1st Stage 1

2nd Drentse 8 van Dwingeloo
2nd Ronde van Gelderland
2nd Tour of Chongming Island World Cup
4th Overall Tour of Chongming Island

1st Stage 2

10th Open de Suède Vårgårda
2014
1st Overall Bay Classic Series

1st Stages 1, 3 & 4

1st Grand Prix de Dottignies
1st RideLondon Grand Prix
Tour Cycliste Féminin International de l'Ardèche

1st Points classification
1st Stages 1, 4 & 6

1st Stage 2 Giro d'Italia Femminile
Tour of Zhoushan Island

1st Points classification
1st Stage 3

2nd Giro del Trentino Alto Adige-Südtirol
2nd Sparkassen Giro
3rd Overall Tour of Chongming Island

1st Stage 3

3rd GP Comune di Cornaredo
3rd Tour of Chongming Island World Cup
3rd Giro dell'Emilia Internazionale Donne Elite
4th Road race, UCI Road World Championships
4th Overall The Women's Tour
6th Overall La Route de France

1st Stage 3

9th Trofeo Alfredo Binda-Comune di Cittiglio
2015
1st Acht van Westerveld
1st Tour of Chongming Island World Cup
La Route de France

1st Stages 2 & 6

2nd Crescent Women World Cup Vårgårda
2nd La Madrid Challenge by La Vuelta
4th Overall Bay Classic Series

1st Stage 4

4th Overall Tour of Chongming Island
5th RideLondon Grand Prix
10th Overall Santos Women's Tour

1st Stage 3

10th Cadel Evans Great Ocean Road Race
2016
1st Grand Prix de Dottignies
1st Stage 3 Emakumeen Euskal Bira
Giro d'Italia Femminile

1st Stages 1 & 8

6th Road race, UEC European Road Championships
10th Trofeo Alfredo Binda-Comune di Cittiglio
2017
1st Stage 4 Tour of California
2nd Road race, UEC European Road Championships
2nd Road race, National Road Championships
3rd Women's Tour de Yorkshire
6th Overall Setmana Ciclista Valenciana
6th Madrid Challenge by La Vuelta
10th Prudential RideLondon Classique
2018
1st Stage 2 Madrid Challenge by La Vuelta
3rd Road race, National Road Championships
3rd Cadel Evans Great Ocean Road Race
5th Omloop van het Hageland
6th Overall Tour of Chongming Island

1st Points classification
1st Stage 1

7th Amstel Gold Race
8th Prudential RideLondon Classique
