= Gulnaz Khatuntseva =

Russian cyclist (born 1994)

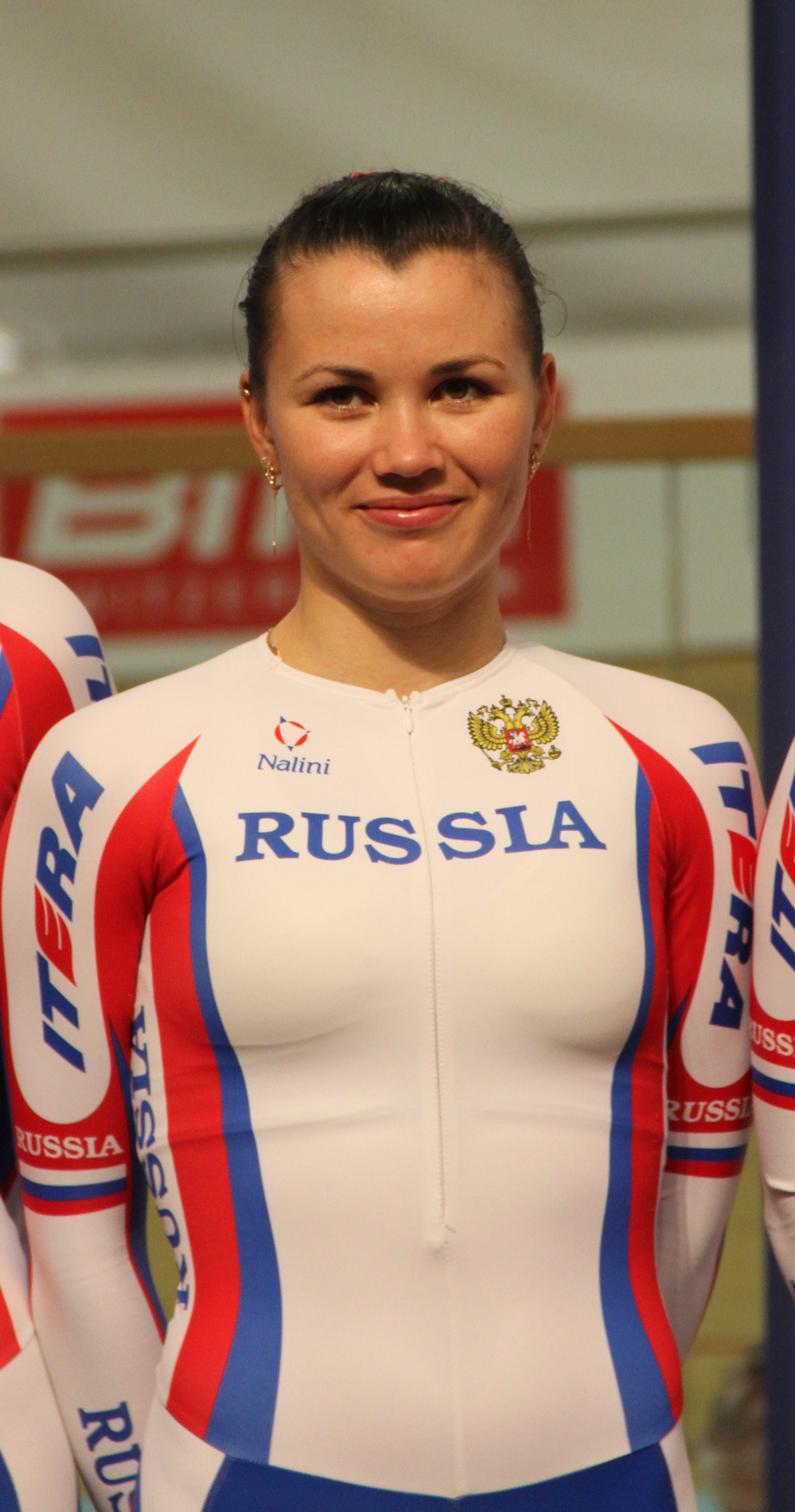
- Khatuntseva at the 2015 UEC European Track Championships

Personal information
- Full name: Gulnaz Eduardovna Khatuntseva; Russian: Гульназ Эдуардовна Хатунцева
- Born: Gulnaz Eduardovna Badykova; 21 April 1994 (age 32) Chekmagush, Bashkortostan, Russia

Cycling career
- Sport: Cycling
- Current team: Roland Le Dévoluy
- Disciplines: Road; Track
- Role: Rider

Professional team
- 2018–: Cogeas–Mettler Pro Cycling Team
Medal record
Women's track cycling
Representing (Russia) ROC
Olympic Games
| Bronze medal – third place | 2020 Tokyo | Madison |
Representing Russia
European Championships
| Gold medal – first place | 2021 Grenchen | Points race |
| Silver medal – second place | 2015 Grenchen | Team pursuit |
| Silver medal – second place | 2017 Berlin | Points race |
| Silver medal – second place | 2018 Glasgow | Madison |
| Bronze medal – third place | 2013 Apeldoorn | Team pursuit |
| Bronze medal – third place | 2018 Glasgow | Points race |

Gulnaz Eduardovna Khatuntseva (Russian: Гульназ Эдуардовна Хатунцева, IPA: [ɡʊlʲˈnas xɐˈtuntsɨvə], née Badykova; born 21 April 1994) is a Russian professional racing cyclist of Tatar descent, who currently rides for UCI Women's Continental Team Roland Le Dévoluy. She rode at the 2015 UCI Track Cycling World Championships.

== Major results ==
=== Track ===
2013
1st Team pursuit, UEC European Under-23 Track Championships (with Alexandra Chekina, Maria Mishina and Svetlana Kashirina)
2014
1st Team pursuit, UEC European Under-23 Track Championships (with Tamara Balabolina, Alexandra Chekina and Aleksandra Goncharova)
2015
UEC European Under-23 Track Championships

1st Points race
3rd Team pursuit (with Tamara Balabolina, Alexandra Chekina and Natalia Mozharova)

2nd Team pursuit, UEC European Track Championships (with Tamara Balabolina, Alexandra Chekina and Maria Savitskaya)
2nd Omnium, Grand Prix Minsk
2016
3rd Scratch, Memorial of Alexander Lesnikov
2017
2nd Points race, UEC European Track Championships
3rd Madison, Grand Prix Minsk (with Tamara Balabolina)
Grand Prix of Moscow

3rd Madison (with Tamara Balabolina)
3rd Points race

2018
International Belgian Track Meeting

1st Points race
2nd Madison (with Anastasia Yakovenko)

=== Road ===
2013
5th Time trial, National Road Championships
8th Time trial, UEC European Under-23 Road Championships
2014
10th Time trial, UEC European Under-23 Road Championships
2018
3rd Overall The Princess Maha Chackri Sirindhon's Cup

1st Stage 1
