= Irina Molicheva =

Russian cyclist

Personal information
- Born: 12 November 1988 (age 37) Russian SFSR, Soviet Union

Cycling career
- Sport: Cycling
- Discipline: Road cycling

Professional teams
- 2012: RusVelo
- 2013: Team Pratomagno Women

Irina Molicheva (born 12 November 1988) is a road cyclist from Russia. She participated at the 2012 UCI Road World Championships in the Women's team time trial.

== Career results ==
2010
3rd Team Pursuit, UEC European U23 Championships, (Alfiya Khabibulina and Elena Lichmanova)
2014
Memorial of Alexander Lesnikov

1st Scratch Race
3rd Individual Pursuit

2nd Team pursuit, UEC European Track Championships (with Tamara Balabolina, Alexandra Chekina, Aleksandra Goncharova and Evgenia Romanyuta)
