= Maria Savitskaya =

Russian cyclist

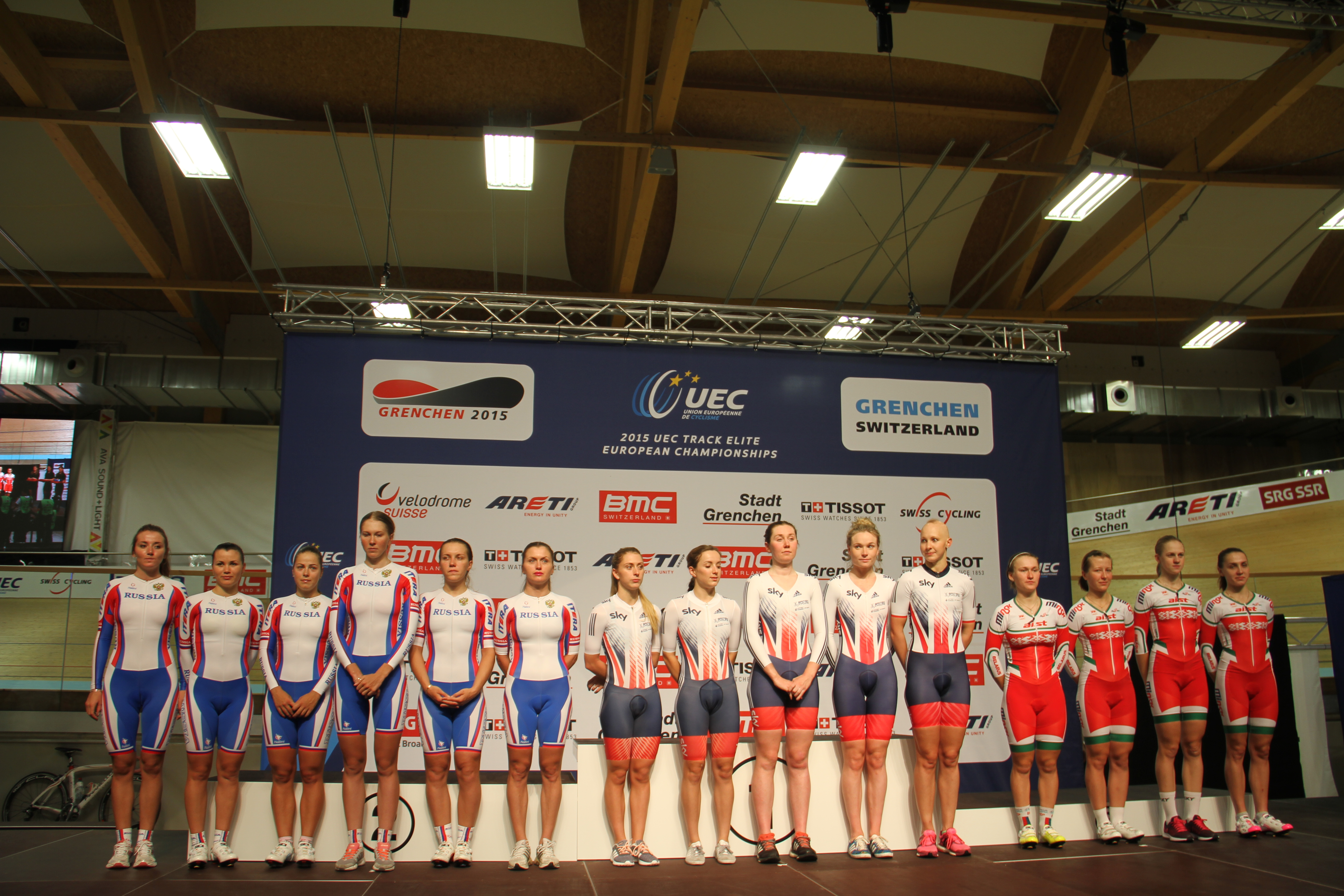
- On the podium at the 2015 European Track Championships

Personal information
- Born: 22 April 1991 (age 35) Russia

Cycling career
- Sport: Cycling
- Role: Rider

Maria Savitskaya-Mishina (born 22 April 1991) is a Russian racing cyclist. She competed in the team pursuit event at the 2013 UCI Track Cycling World Championships and she rode at the 2014 UCI Road World Championships.

== Major results ==
=== Track ===
2008
3rd Team Pursuit, UEC European U23 Track Championships (with Oxana Kozonchuk, Evgenia Romanyuta and Victoria Kondel)
2013
1st Team pursuit, UEC European U23 Track Championships (with Gulnaz Badykova, Alexandra Chekina and Svetlana Kashirina)
2015
2nd Team Pursuit, UEC European Track Championships (with Gulnaz Badykova, Tamara Balabolina and Alexandra Chekina)

=== Road ===
2008
UEC European Junior Road Championships

3rd Time trial
10th Road race

2012
4th Heydar Aliyev Anniversary Time Trial
