= Oksana Lesnik =

Ukrainian cyclist

Personal information
- Born: 20 August 1988 (age 38)

Cycling career
- Sport: Cycling
- Discipline: Track cycling
- Role: Rider
- Rider type: team pursuit

Oksana Lesnik (born 20 August 1988) is a Ukrainian female track cyclist. She competed in the team pursuit event at the 2013 UCI Track Cycling World Championships.
