= Edita Mazurevičiūtė =

Lithuanian cyclist (born 1996)

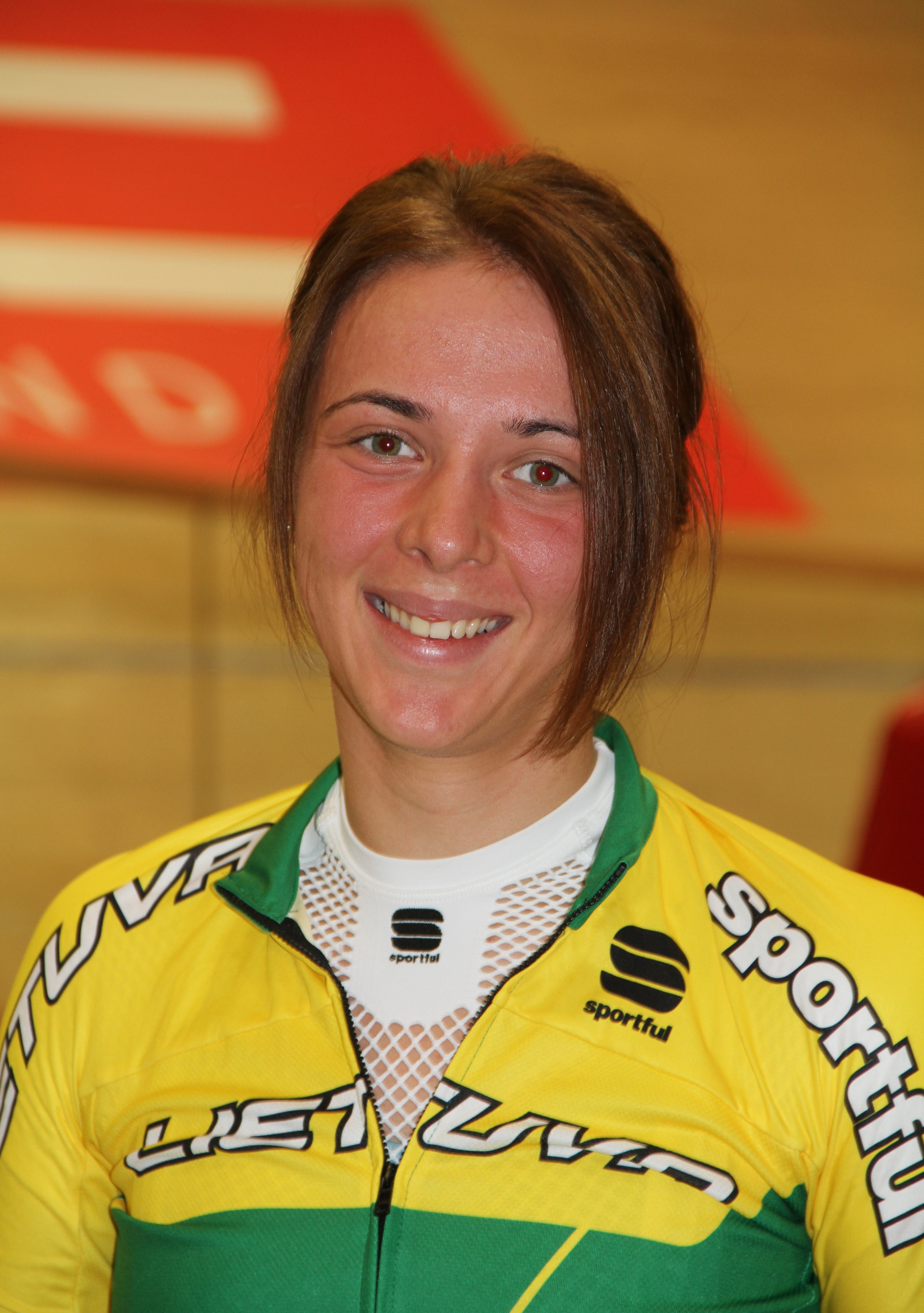
- Mazurevičiūtė at the 2015 UEC European Track Championships

Personal information
- Born: Lithuania

Cycling career
- Sport: Cycling
- Discipline: Track cycling

Edita Mazurevičiūtė (born 10 January 1996) is a track cyclist from Lithuania. She represented her nation at the 2015 UCI Track Cycling World Championships.

== Major results ==
2015
3rd Scratch Race, Panevezys
