= Alexandra Chekina =

Russian cyclist

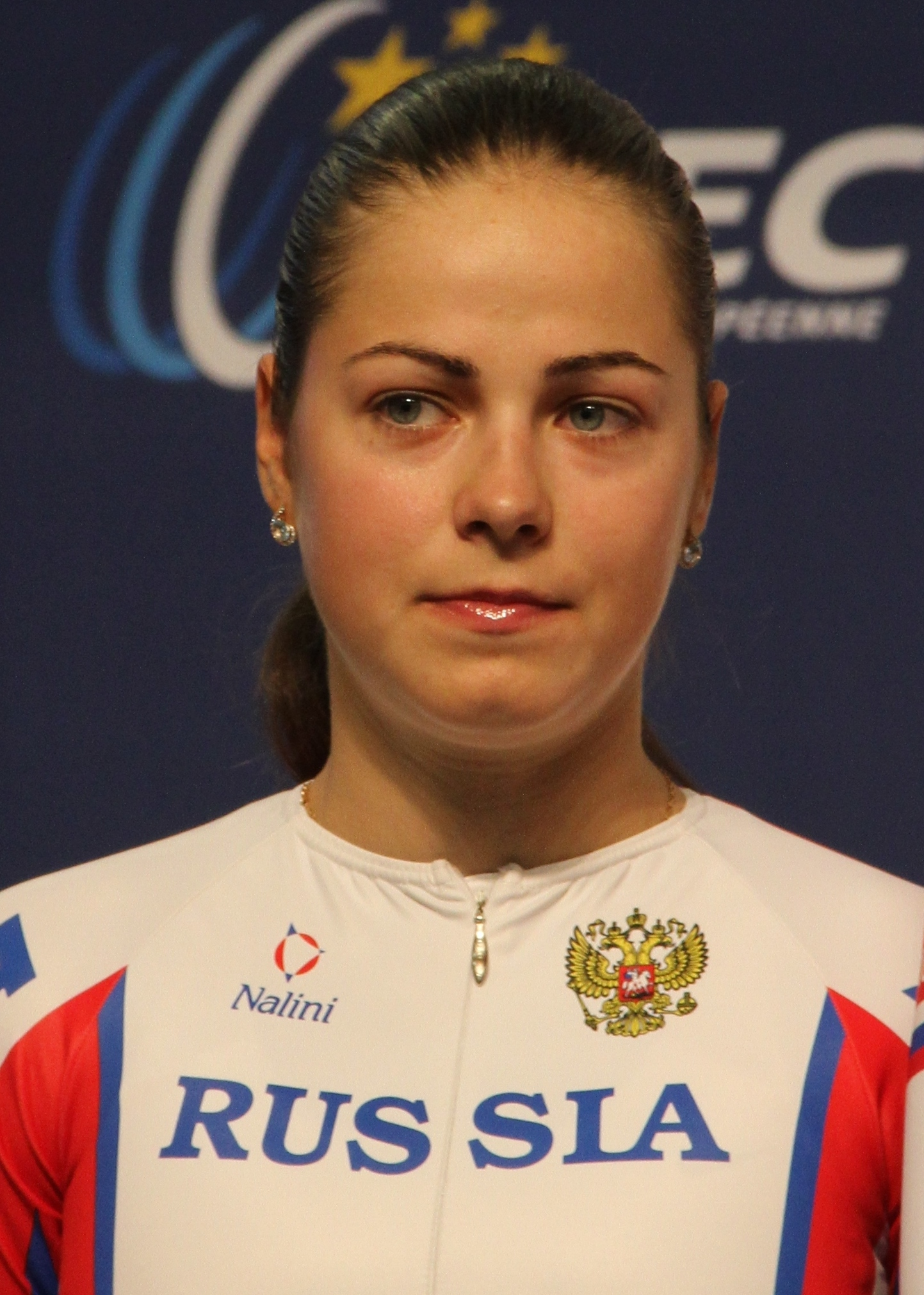
- Chekina at the 2015 UEC European Track Championships

Personal information
- Born: 10 February 1993 (age 33) Russia

Cycling career
- Sport: Cycling
- Disciplines: Road cycling Track cycling
Medal record
Representing Russia
European Track Championships
Bronze medal – third place	2013 Apeldoorn	Team pursuit
Silver medal – second place	2015 Grenchen	Team pursuit

Alexandra Chekina (Russian: Александра Чекина; born 10 February 1993) is a track and road cyclist from Russia.

== Career ==
=== Road cycling ===
She participated at the 2012 UCI Road World Championships. As an under-23 rider she participated at the 2014 European Road Championships, finishing 9th in the Women's under-23 road race.

=== Track cycling ===
After winning the bronze medal on the track in 2013 in the team pursuit at the 2013 UEC European Track Championships, she won the silver medal in the team pursuit at the 2015 UEC European Track Championships in Grenchen, Switzerland.

== Career results ==
2012
3rd Individual Pursuit, UEC European U23 Track Championships
2013
1st Team pursuit, UEC European U23 Track Championships (with Gulnaz Badykova, Maria Mishina and Svetlana Kashirina)
2014
UEC European U23 Track Championships

1st Team pursuit (with Tamara Balabolina, Alexandra Goncharova and Gulnaz Badykova)
3rd Points Race

2nd Team pursuit, UEC European Track Championships (with Tamara Balabolina, Irina Molicheva, Aleksandra Goncharova and Evgenia Romanyuta)
2015
2nd Team Pursuit, UEC European Track Championships (with Gulnaz Badykova, Tamara Balabolina and Maria Savitskaya)
3rd Team Pursuit, UEC European U23 Track Championships (with Gulnaz Badykova, Tamara Balabolina and Natalia Mozharova)
