= Victoria Kondel =

Russian cyclist

Personal information
- Born: 6 October 1987 (age 39)

Cycling career
- Sport: Cycling
- Disciplines: Track cycling Road cycling
- Role: Rider
- Rider type: endurance

Victoria Kondel (born 6 October 1987) is a Russian female road and track cyclist. On the track she won the silver medal at the 2009 UEC European Track Championships – Women's under-23 points race and the bronze medal in the third round of the 2011–12 UCI Track Cycling World Cup in Beijing. She competed in the team pursuit event at the 2009, 2010 and 2012 UCI Track Cycling World Championships.

On the road she competed at the 2009 European Road Championships – Women's under-23 time trial.

== Career results ==
2008
3rd Team Pursuit, UEC European 23 Track Championships (with Oxana Kozonchuk, Maria Mishina and Evgeniya Romanyuta)
2009
2nd Points race, UEC European 23 Track Championships
