= Evgeniya Augustinas =

Russian cyclist (born 1988)

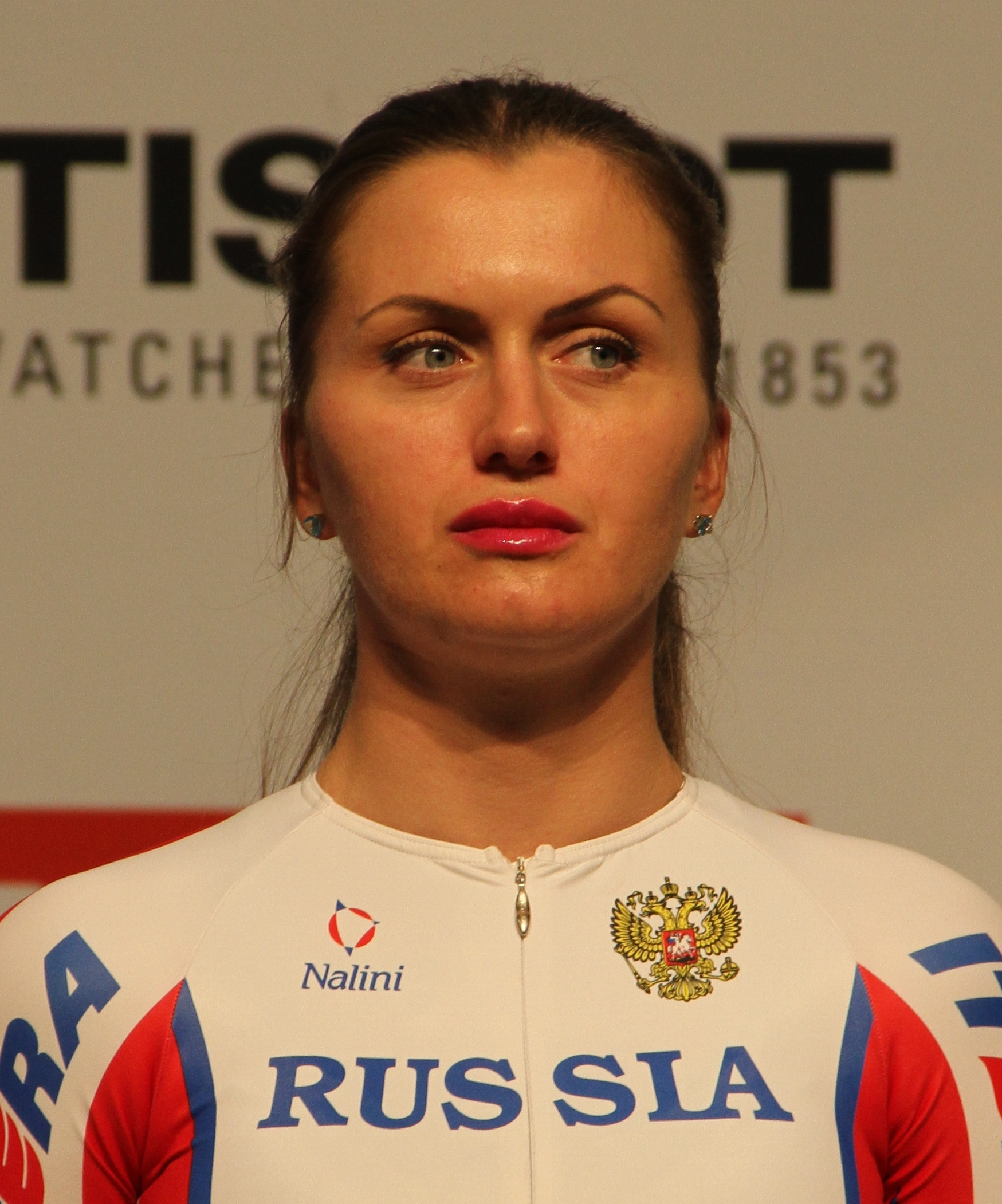

Personal information
- Full name: Evgeniya Sergeyevna Augustinas; Russian: Евгения Сергеевна Аугустинас
- Born: Evgeniya Sergeyevna Romanyuta; 22 January 1988 (age 38): Tula, Russian SSR, Soviet Union; (now Russia)

Cycling career
- Sport: Cycling
- Disciplines: Road; Track
- Role: Rider

Amateur team
- 2009–2010: Moscow Track Team

Professional teams
- 2012–2013: RusVelo
- 2018–2019: Cogeas
Medal record
Representing Russia
Women's track cycling
World Championships
| Bronze medal – third place | 2013 Minsk | Scratch |
| Bronze medal – third place | 2014 Cali | Scratch |
European Games
| Silver medal – second place | 2019 Minsk | Omnium |
European Championships
| Gold medal – first place | 2011 Apeldoorn | Points Race |
| Gold medal – first place | 2014 Baie-Mahault | Scratch |
| Silver medal – second place | 2012 Panevėžys | Points Race |
| Silver medal – second place | 2014 Baie-Mahault | Team pursuit |
| Silver medal – second place | 2015 Grenchen | Team pursuit |
| Silver medal – second place | 2017 Berlin | Elimination |
| Bronze medal – third place | 2013 Apeldoorn | Team pursuit |
| Bronze medal – third place | 2017 Berlin | Scratch |
| Bronze medal – third place | 2018 Glasgow | Elimination |
European U23 Championships
| Bronze medal – third place | 2008 Pruszków | Scratch |
| Bronze medal – third place | 2009 Minsk | Scratch |

Evgeniya Sergeyevna Augustinas (Russian: Евгения Сергеевна Аугустинас, née Romanyuta; born 22 January 1988 in Tula) is a Russian professional racing cyclist, who last rode for UCI Women's Team Cogeas–Mettler–Look.

== Major results ==
=== Track ===
2005
2nd Scratch, UEC European Junior Championships
3rd Scratch, UCI Junior World Championships

2006
UEC European Junior Championships

2nd Points race
3rd Scratch

UCI Junior World Championships

3rd Points race
3rd Scratch

2007
2007–08 UCI World Cup Classics

1st Team pursuit, Sydney
2nd Team pursuit, Beijing

2008
2008–09 UCI World Cup Classics

1st Points race, Melbourne
3rd Scratch, Melbourne

2nd Scratch, 2007–08 UCI World Cup Classics, Los Angeles
UEC European Under-23 Championships

3rd Scratch Race
3rd Team Pursuit (with Oxana Kozonchuk, Maria Mishina and Victoria Kondel)

2009
2008–09 UCI World Cup Classics

1st Scratch, Beijing
3rd Team pursuit, Beijing

2009–10 UCI World Cup Classics

1st Scratch, Melbourne
2nd Scratch, Manchester
3rd Points race, Manchester

3rd Scratch race, UEC European Under-23 Championships

2010
3rd Scratch, 2009–10 UCI World Cup Classics, Beijing
3rd Scratch, UEC European Under-23 Championships

2011
1st Points race, UEC European Championships
1st Omnium, 2011–12 UCI World Cup, Astana

2012
1st Omnium, 2011–12 UCI World Cup, Beijing
5th Omnium, UCI World Championships

2013
3rd Points race, UCI World Championships

2014
UEC European Championships

1st Scratch
2nd Team pursuit (with Tamara Balabolina, Alexandra Chekina, Aleksandra Goncharova and Irina Molicheva)

Memorial of Alexander Lesnikov

1st Individual pursuit
1st Points race

Grand Prix of Poland

1st Omnium
1st Scratch

2015
1st Omnium, GP Prostejov – Memorial of Otmar Malecek
Memorial of Alexander Lesnikov

2nd Omnium
3rd Scratch

2016
1st Scratch, Panevežys
2nd Points race, GP Prostejov – Memorial of Otmar Malecek
3rd Scratch, 2016–17 UCI World Cup, Glasgow

2017
International race – Panevežys

1st Omnium
2nd Points Race

UEC European Championships

2nd Elimination Race
3rd Scratch Race

2018
2nd Omnium, Six Days of Bremen

=== Road ===
2012
4th Road race, National Road Championships

2013
4th Team time trial, UCI World Championships

2018
1st Stage 1 (TTT) The Princess Maha Chackri Sirindhon's Cup
