= Marta Tagliaferro =

Italian racing cyclist

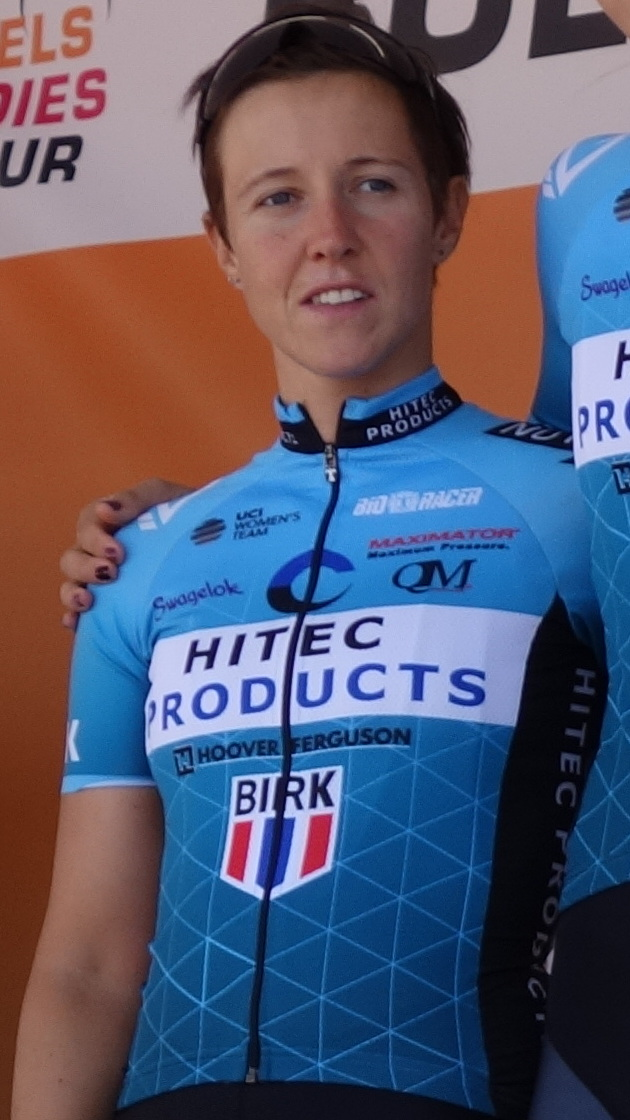
- Tagliaferro in 2019.

Personal information
- Full name: Marta Tagliaferro
- Born: November 4, 1989 (age 36) Noventa Vicentina, Italy

Cycling career
- Sport: Cycling
- Current team: Retired
- Disciplines: Road; Track
- Role: Rider

Amateur team
- 2008: Titanedi–Frezza Acca Due O

Professional teams
- 2009: Gruppo Sportivo Top Girls–Fassa Bortolo–Raxy Line
- 2009: Gauss RDZ Ormu–Colnago
- 2010: Top Girls Fassa Bortolo–Ghezzi
- 2011–2016: Mcipollini–Giordana
- 2017–2018: Cylance Pro Cycling
- 2019–2020: Hitec Products–Birk Sport

Marta Tagliaferro (born 4 November 1989 in Noventa Vicentina, Italy) is an Italian former track and road racing cyclist, who rode professionally between 2009 and 2020 for the Gauss RDZ Ormu–Colnago, Top Girls Fassa Bortolo–Ghezzi, Alé–Cipollini, Cylance Pro Cycling and Hitec Products–Birk Sport teams. As a junior rider Tagliaferro won three Italian national titles in 2007: two on the track and one on the road. She became under-23 European champion in the points race at the 2009 European Track Championships.

== Major results ==
2007
National Junior Track Championships

1st Points race
1st Scratch

1st Road race, National Junior Road Championships
3rd Points race, UEC European Junior Track Championships
2008
3rd Team pursuit, 2008–09 UCI Track Cycling World Cup Classics, Cali
2009
1st Points race, UEC European Under-23 Track Championships
9th Novilon Eurocup Ronde van Drenthe
2010
2nd Points race, UEC European Under-23 Track Championships
5th Tour of Chongming Island World Cup
6th Overall Tour of Chongming Island Stage race
7th GP Liberazione
2011
2nd Team pursuit, National Track Championships
2012
3rd Overall Trophée d'Or Féminin
9th GP de Plouay – Bretagne
2013
National Track Championships

1st Omnium
1st Team pursuit
2nd Scratch
3rd Keirin

3rd Classica Citta di Padova
3rd Scratch, Copa Internacional de Pista
6th Tour of Chongming Island World Cup
9th Overall Ladies Tour of Qatar
2014
National Track Championships

1st Team pursuit
2nd Scratch

2nd Overall Tour of Zhoushan Island
9th Overall Tour of Chongming Island
2015
5th EPZ Omloop van Borsele
6th Novilon EDR Cup
9th Ronde van Drenthe World Cup
2016
1st Stage 2 Tour Femenino de San Luis
1st Stage 5 Gracia–Orlová
6th Overall BeNe Ladies Tour
2019
1st Omloop van de IJsseldelta
1st Stage 1 Tour de Feminin-O cenu Českého Švýcarska
6th Overall Tour of Chongming Island
8th RideLondon Classique

Sporting positions
Preceded by Ellen van Dijk (NED)	Under-23 European Track Champion (points race); 2008	Succeeded by Aksana Papko (BLR)
