= 2008 Vrienden van het Platteland season =

2008 Vrienden van het Platteland
- UCI Team ranking: 19th
- Manager: Wim Kruis

Season victories
- One-day races: Road: 4 Track: 13
- Stage race overall: 0
- Stage race stages: 2
- Best ranked rider: Liesbet De Vocht (73rd)

The 2008 women's road cycling season was the ninth and last season for the Vrienden van het Platteland (UCI code: VVP) cycling team, which began as Ondernemers van Nature in 2000.

Ellen van Dijk became European Champion in the time trial and won the stage 2 of the 2008 Tour de l'Aude Cycliste Féminin and the prologue of 2008 Tour Féminin en Limousin. An Van Rie won the Belgian Time Trial Championships. However, the largest victories were on the track. Ellen van Dijk became World Champion in the scratch and European champion in the Women's points race and Women's scratch. At the European championships she also won two silver medals. Willy Kanis won 4 times an individual event at the Track Cycling World Cups in 2008 and together with Yvonne Hijgenaar two times the team sprint event. The team finished 19th in the 2008 UCI Team Ranking.

== Roster ==
Ages as of 1 January 2008.

Rider	Date of birth
Liesbeth Bakker (NED)	1 July 1986 (aged 21)
Martine Bras (NED)	17 May 1987 (aged 20)
Nikki Butterfield-Egyed (AUS)	12 April 1982 (aged 25)
Ellen van Dijk (NED)	11 February 1987 (aged 20)
Lorian Graham (AUS)	8 November 1977 (aged 30)
Yvonne Hijgenaar (NED)	15 May 1980 (aged 27)
Marit Huisman (NED)	1 March 1989 (aged 18)
Willy Kanis (NED)	27 July 1984 (aged 23)
Roxane Knetemann (NED)	1 April 1987 (aged 20)

Rider	Date of birth
Kristy Miggels (NED)	6 August 1980 (aged 27)
Tina Pic (USA)	9 May 1966 (aged 41)
Martine van der Herberg (NED)	24 November 1989 (aged 18)
An Van Rie (BEL)	9 June 1974 (aged 33)
Annemiek van Vleuten (NED)	8 October 1982 (aged 25)
Monique Verstraten (NED)	24 April 1983 (aged 24)
Liesbet De Vocht (BEL)	5 January 1979 (aged 28)
Jaccolien Wallaard (NED)	30 September 1982 (aged 25)

Guest riders

The team had Felicia Gomez and Linn Torp as guest riders during the Tour of New Zealand and Gomez also during the Geelong Tour.

Riders who joined the team for the 2008 season
Rider	2007 team
Martine Bras (NED)	
Nikki Butterfield-Egyed (AUS)	
Lorian Graham (AUS)	
Yvonne Hijgenaar (NED)	
Marit Huisman (NED)	
Willy Kanis (NED)	
Roxane Knetemann (NED)	
Kristy Miggels (NED)	
Tina Pic (USA)	
Martine van der Herberg (NED)	
An Van Rie (BEL)	
Annemiek van Vleuten (NED)	
Liesbet De Vocht (BEL)	

Riders who left the team during or after the 2007 season
Rider	2008 team
Janne Brok (NED)	
Katie Brown (AUS)	
Yvonne Leezer (NED)	
Emma Mackie (AUS)	
Anita Valen (NOR)	
Monique van de Ree (NED)	
Moniek Rotmensen (NED)	

== Season ==
=== January–March: track cycling ===
At the begin of the year Willy Kanis, Yvonne Hijgenaar and Ellen van Dijk were active on the track. At the 3rd round of the 2007–08 UCI Track Cycling World Cup in Los Angeles Kanis and Hijgenaar won the team sprint. At the 4th round in Copenhagen in February Kanis won the sprint and Keirin. Ellen van Dijk and Yvonne Hijgenaar finished in the team pursuit together with Marlijn Binnendijk second in a new Dutch national record. Ellen van Dijk was chosen to ride the individual pursuit in the remaining two (out of four) 2007–2008 track cycling World Cups due to her good results at the 2007 Dutch National Track Championships. Van Dijk could, via the UCI World Ranking system, potentially earn qualification for the 2008 Olympic Games. She finished in Los Angeles and Copenhagen in fifth and fourth places respectively. After finishing fifth in the individual pursuit at the World Track Championships in Manchester, Van Dijk missed out on qualification for the Olympic Games; she finished 12th in the UCI World Rankings and only the first eleven riders qualified. The day after she took revenge by winning her first major senior title, the scratch race at the 2008 World Cycling Championships. With eight laps to go she attacked and rode solo to the finish line. Van Dijk finished at the World Championships in the team pursuit furthermore 6th in a new Dutch national record. At the World Championships Kanis did not win a medal and finished 4th and 5th in the women's 500 m time trial and Women's sprint, Hijgenaar finished in these disciplines 10th and 8th.

=== April–June: road cycling ===
At the end of April Annemiek van Vleuten finished second in the GP Stad Roeselare. Martine Bras and Ellen van Dijk were part of the national team at the Tour de l'Aude Cycliste Féminin where they won team time trial stage 2. Furthermore, Ellen van Dijk finished second in the prologue and Bras finished third in stage 7. At the same time the team rode at the Tour de Pologne Feminin where Liesbet De Vocht finished third in the general classification. An Van Rie finished third in the first stage. At the Rabo Ster Zeeuwsche Eilanden in mid June, Ellen van Dijk finished second in the time trial of stage 1. In the later stages Van Dijk and the team fought for her place in the general classification. She won the youth classification and finished third overall.

=== July–September: road and track cycling championships ===
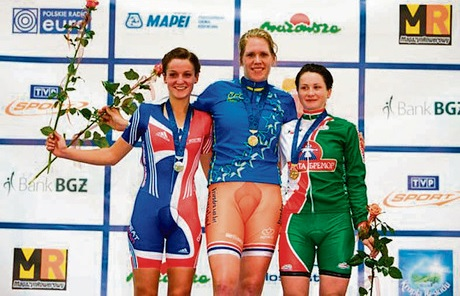
Ellen van Dijk won 2 gold medals and 2 silver medals at the European Track Championships. Pictured: podium women's points race

As the Dutch national time trial champion and due to her good results in the time trials, Ellen van Dijk was selected to participate at the 2008 European Road Championships. Van Dijk became 2008 European Time Trial Champion and finished 31st in the road race. Ellen van Dijk showed again her strong time trial skills in the Tour Féminin en Limousin where she won the initial time trial stage over 4.6 km. Annemiek van Vleuten finished third, 10 seconds behind her. Van Dijk was not selected to ride the time trial at the Summer Olympics, because the course would be too heavy for her. At the National championships, An Van Rie won the Belgian National Time Trial Championships. Ellen van Dijk could not defend successfully her Dutch national time trial title and finished fourth. Annemiek van Vleuten seventh.

Willy Kanis and Yvonne Hijgenaar participated at the 2008 Summer Olympics on the track in the women's sprint. Kanis lost the bronze-medal match and ended in 4th place. Hijgenaar became 11th. As the scratch world champion Ellen van Dijk also became European Track Champion in the scratch as well as in the points race in September. Van Dijk rode to the silver medal in the elite omnium and the individual pursuit events.

Several riders from the team were selected by their national federation to participate at the 2008 UCI Road World Championships to represent the country. Ellen van Dijk (20th) and An Van Rie participated in the time trial. Nikki Egyed (15th) and Liesbet De Vocht (58th) in the road race

=== November–December: track cycling ===
At the end of November Willy Kanis won on the track at the second round of the 2008–09 Track Cycling World Cup in Melbourne the 500m time trial and sprint and together with Yvonne Hijgenaar also the team sprint. At the 2008 Dutch National Track Championships at the end of December Kanis became three times national champion in the sprint disciplines, the 500m time trial, keirin and sprint. Also Ellen van Dijk defended her title successfully in the individual pursuit.

== Results ==
=== Season victories ===
Single day and stage races 2008
Date	Nation	Race	Cat.	Winner
18-20 January	United States	Team sprint: 2007–08 Track Cycling World Cup – Round 3 (Los Angeles)	CDM	(Netherlands) Yvonne Hijgenaar (Netherlands) Willy Kanis
15-17 February	Denmark	Sprint: 2007–08 Track Cycling World Cup – Round 4 (Copenhagen)	CDM	(Netherlands) Willy Kanis
15-17 February	Denmark	Keirin: 2007–08 Track Cycling World Cup – Round 4 (Copenhagen)	CDM	(Netherlands) Willy Kanis
18 May	France	Stage 2 2008 Tour de l'Aude Cycliste Féminin	2.1	(Netherlands) Ellen van Dijk
24 July	France	Prologue 2008 Tour Féminin en Limousin	2.2	(Netherlands) Ellen van Dijk
20-22 November	Australia	Team sprint: 2007–08 Track Cycling World Cup – Round 2 (Melbourne)	CDM	(Netherlands) Yvonne Hijgenaar (Netherlands) Willy Kanis
20-22 November	Australia	500m time trial: 2007–08 Track Cycling World Cup – Round 2 (Melbourne)	CDM	(Netherlands) Willy Kanis
20-22 November	Australia	Keirin: 2007–08 Track Cycling World Cup – Round 2 (Melbourne)	CDM	(Netherlands) Willy Kanis

National, Continental and World champions 2009
Date	Discipline	Jersey	Winner
30 March	Track Cycling World Champion – Scratch		(Netherlands) Ellen van Dijk
3 July	European Road Champion – Time Trial		(Netherlands) Ellen van Dijk
15 August	Belgian National Time Trial Champion		An Van Rie
6 September	European Track Champion – Under-23 points race		(Netherlands) Ellen van Dijk
7 September	European Track Champion – Under-23 scratch		(Netherlands) Ellen van Dijk
30 December	Dutch National Track Cycling Champion – Individual pursuit		Ellen van Dijk
30 December	Dutch National Track Cycling Champion – 500m time trial		Willy Kanis
30 December	Dutch National Track Cycling Champion – Sprint		Willy Kanis
30 December	Dutch National Track Cycling Champion – Keirin		Willy Kanis

== Results in major races ==
=== Women's World Cup 2008 ===
Results at the 2008 UCI Women's Road World Cup races
#	Date	Race	Country	Best rider	Place
#1	24 February	Geelong World Cup	Australia	(United States) Tina Pic	19th
#2	24 March	Trofeo Alfredo Binda-Comune di Cittiglio	Italy	(Australia) Lorian Graham	9th
#3	6 April	Tour of Flanders for Women	Belgium	(Netherlands) Martine Bras	20th
#4	12 April	Ronde van Drenthe	Netherlands	(Belgium) Liesbet De Vocht	7th
#5	23 April	La Flèche Wallonne Féminine	Belgium	(Australia) Lorian Graham	24th
#6	4 May	Tour de Berne	Switzerland	(Australia) Nikki Butterfield	7th
#7	31 May	Coupe du Monde Cycliste Féminine de Montréal	Canada	-	-
#8	30 July	Open de Suède Vårgårda	Sweden	(Netherlands) Martine Bras	10th
#9	1 August	Open de Suède Vårgårda TTT	Sweden	Vrienden van het Platteland	5th
#10	24 August	GP de Plouay – Bretagne	France	(Netherlands) Martine Bras	5th
#11	16 September	Rund um die Nürnberger Altstadt	Germany	(Netherlands) Liesbeth Bakker	14th

Results in other major single day races
Date	Race (Note: Riders are in these championships part of the national team)	Rider	Place
26 March	Track Cycling World Championships – Women's 500 m time trial	(Netherlands) Willy Kanis	4th
28 March	Track Cycling World Championships – Women's team pursuit	(Netherlands) Ellen van Dijk (with Marlijn Binnendijk and Elise van Hage)	6th
29 March	Track Cycling World Championships – Women's sprint	(Netherlands) Willy Kanis	5th
29 March	Track Cycling World Championships – Women's keirin	(Netherlands) Willy Kanis	9th
30 March	Track Cycling World Championships – Women's scratch	(Netherlands) Ellen van Dijk	1st place, gold medalist(s)
3 July	European Road Championships – Women's under-23 time trial	(Netherlands) Ellen van Dijk	1st place, gold medalist(s)
5 July	European Road Championships – Women's under-23 road race	(Netherlands) Ellen van Dijk	31st
3 September	European Track Championships – Women's omnium	(Netherlands) Ellen van Dijk	2nd place, silver medalist(s)
6 September	European Track Championships – Women's under-23 individual pursuit	(Netherlands) Ellen van Dijk	2nd place, silver medalist(s)
7 September	European Track Championships – Women's under-23 scratch	(Netherlands) Ellen van Dijk	1st place, gold medalist(s)
6 September	European Track Championships – Women's under-23 points race	(Netherlands) Ellen van Dijk	1st place, gold medalist(s)
23 September	Road World Championships – Women's time trial	(Netherlands) Ellen van Dijk	20th
24 September	Road World Championships – Women's road race	Nikki Egyed (AUS)	15th

== Other achievements ==
=== Dutch national records, team pursuit ===
The women's 3000 m team pursuit track cycling discipline was introduced at the 2007–08 track cycling season. The Dutch team including Ellen van Dijk and Yvonne Hijgenaar rode the team pursuit for the first time at Round 4 at the 2007–08 UCI Track Cycling World Cup in Copenhagen in a time of 3:36.901 (49.792 km/h). They broke the record later that day. At the 2008 UCI Track Cycling World Championships the Dutch team including Van Dijk broke the record again in the qualifying round. This is not the current record anymore.

Time	Speed (km/h)	Cyclists	Event	Location of race	Date	Ref
3:36.901	49.792	Ellen van Dijk and Yvonne Hijgenaar (with Marlijn Binnendijk)	2007–08 UCI Track Cycling World Cup Classics – Round 4 (qualification)	(Denmark) Copenhagen	17 February 2008	
3:32.666	50.783	Ellen van Dijk and Yvonne Hijgenaar (with Marlijn Binnendijk)	2007–08 UCI Track Cycling World Cup Classics – Round 4 (gold-medal race)	(Denmark) Copenhagen	17 February 2008	
3:31.596	51.040	Ellen van Dijk (with Marlijn Binnendijk and Elise van Hage)	2008 UCI Track Cycling World Championships (qualifying)	(United Kingdom) Manchester	28 March 2008	

== UCI World Ranking ==
The team finished 19th in the UCI ranking for teams.

Individual UCI World Ranking
Rank	Rider	Points
73	(Belgium) Liesbet De Vocht	77.25
78	(Netherlands) Martine Bras	75
79	(Netherlands) Ellen van Dijk	74.91
88	(Netherlands) Annemiek van Vleuten	64.25
107	(Australia) Nikki Egyed	48
120	(Belgium) An Van Rie	39.25
154	(Australia) Lorian Graham	24
161	(United States) Tina Pic	23
216	(Netherlands) Marit Huisman	11.25
225	(Netherlands) Liesbeth Bakker	10.25
262	(Netherlands) Jaccolien Wallaard	8
