= 2007–08 UCI Track Cycling World Cup Classics – Round 4 – Women's scratch =

Round 4 Women's scratch
2007–08 UCI Track Cycling World Cup Classics, race 4/4

Race details
- Dates: 15 February 2008
- Stages: 1
- Distance: 10 km (6.214 mi)

Medalists
	Gold	Marianne Vos (NED)
	Silver	Jarmila Machačová (CZE)
	Bronze	Anastasia Chulkova (RUS)

The fourth round of the women's scratch race of the 2007–08 UCI Track Cycling World Cup Classics took place in Copenhagen, Denmark on 15 February 2008.

== Competition format ==
A scratch race is a race in which all riders start together and the object is simply to be first over the finish line after a certain number of laps. There are no intermediate points or sprints.

The tournament consisted of two qualifying heats of 7.5 km (30 laps). The top twelve cyclist of each heat advanced to the 10 km final (40 laps).

== Schedule ==
Friday 15 February
16:15-16:35 Qualifying
20:00-20:20 Final
20:45-20:50 Victory Ceremony

Schedule from Tissottiming.com

== Results ==
=== Qualifying ===
Qualifying Heat 1

Rank	Cyclist	Team	Notes
Results unknown

Qualifying Heat 2

Rank	Cyclist	Team	Notes
1	Débora Gálves Lopez	Spain	Q
2	Shelley Olds	PRO	Q
3	Wan Yiu Wong	Hong Kong	Q
4	Pascale Jeuland	France	Q
5	Lada Kozlíková	Czech Republic	Q
6	Theresa Cliff-Ryan	VBR	Q
7	Alena Prudnikova	Russia	Q
8	Annalisa Cucionotta	Italy	Q
9	Aksana Papko	Belarus	Q
10	Gina Grain	Canada	Q
11	Kelly Druyts	Belgium	Q
12	Elke Gebhardt	Germany	Q
13	Andrea Wölfer	Switzerland	
14	Iona Wynter	Jamaica	
15	Eneritz Iturriagaechevarria Mazaga	EUS	
16	Stephanie Roorda	TRC	
17	Marlijn Binnendijk	Netherlands	
18	Neva Day	SBW	
19	Jessica Jurado	Mexico	
20	Seon Ha Ha	South Korea	

Results from Tissottiming.com.

=== Final ===
Rank	Cyclist	Team
1st place, gold medalist(s)	Marianne Vos	DSB
2nd place, silver medalist(s)	Jarmila Machačová	Czech Republic
3rd place, bronze medalist(s)	Anastasia Chulkova	Russia
4	Theresa Cliff-Ryan	VBR
5	Gema Pascual Torrecilla	Spain
6	Rebecca Quinn	United States
7	Pascale Jeuland	France
8	Alena Prudnikova	Russia
9	Elke Gebhardt	Germany
10	Aksana Papko	Belarus
11	Kate Cullen	Scotland
12	Annalisa Cucionotta	Italy
13	Kelly Druyts	Belgium
14	Shelley Olds	PRO
15	Gina Grain	Canada
16	Wan Yiu Wong	Hong Kong
17	Hyo Seong Noh	South Korea
18	Christy King	SBW
19	Yoanka González Perez	Cuba
20	Eleonora Soldo	South Africa
21	Kele Murdin	PRO
22	Lada Kozlíková	Czech Republic
23	Débora Gálves Lopez	Spain
24	Marta Tagliaferro	Italy

Results from Tissottiming.com.

== World Cup Standings ==
Final standings after 4 of 4 2007–08 World Cup races.

Rank	Cyclist	Team	Round 1	Round 2	Round 3	Round 4	Total points
1	Yumari González Valdivieso	Cuba	12	8	5		25
2	Marianne Vos	DSB		12		12	24
3	Rebecca Quinn	United States	5	6	3	5	19
4	Evgenia Romanyuta	Russia	7		10		17
5	Belinda Goss	Australia	6	10			16
6	Anastasia Chulkova	Russia	8			8	16
7	Charlotte Becker	RAD		2	12		14
8	Annalisa Cucionotta	Italy	10	3			13
9	Pascale Jeuland	France	4	1	2	4	11
10	Jarmila Machačová	Czech Republic				10	10
11	Theresa Cliff-Ryan	VBR			1	8	9
12	Gina Grain	Canada	2	7			9
13	Elena Tchalykh	Russia			8		8
14	Ellen van Dijk	Netherlands			7		7
15	Gema Pascual Torrecilla	Spain				6	6
16	Trine Schmidt	Denmark			6		6
17	Iona Wynter	Jamaica		5			5
18	Kate Cullen	SCO			4		4
19	Song Hee Han	South Korea		4			4
20	Alena Prudnikova	Russia				3	3
21	Joanne Kiesanowski	New Zealand	3				3
22	Elke Gebhardt	Germany				2	2
23	Aksana Papko	Belarus				1	1
24	Adrie Visser	Netherlands	1				1

Results from Tissottiming.com.

== See also ==
- 2007–08 UCI Track Cycling World Cup Classics – Round 4 – Women's individual pursuit
- 2007–08 UCI Track Cycling World Cup Classics – Round 4 – Women's points race
- 2007–08 UCI Track Cycling World Cup Classics – Round 4 – Women's team pursuit
