= 2007–08 UCI Track Cycling World Cup Classics – Round 4 – Women's points race =

Round 4 Women's points race
2007–08 UCI Track Cycling World Cup Classics, race 4/4

Race details
- Dates: 16 February 2008
- Stages: 1
- Distance: 20 km (12.43 mi)
- Winning time: 25:55.840

Medalists
| | Gold | Wan Yiu Wong (HKG) |
| | Silver | Trine Schmidt (DEN) |
| | Bronze | Theresa Cliff-Ryan (USA) |

The fourth round of the women's points race of the 2007–08 UCI Track Cycling World Cup Classics took place in Copenhagen, Denmark on 16 February 2008. 45 athletes participated in the contest.

== Competition format ==
A points race is a race in which all riders start together and the object is to earn points during sprints or to lap the bunch.

The tournament consisted of two qualifying heats of 10 km (40 laps). The top twelve cyclist of each heat advanced to the 20 km final (80 laps).

== Schedule ==
Saturday 16 February
12:35-12:55 Qualifying, heat 1
12:55-13:15 Qualifying, heat 2
16:10-14:40 Final
14:50-14:55 Victory Ceremony

Schedule from Tissottiming.com

== Results ==
=== Qualifying ===
Qualifying Heat 1

| Rank | Cyclist | Team | Points | Notes |
|---|---|---|---|---|
| 1 | Wan Yiu Wong | Hong Kong | 5 | Q |
| 2 | Aksana Papko | Belarus | 5 | Q |
| 3 | Jarmila Machačová | Czech Republic | 5 | Q |
| 4 | Cathy Moncassin Prime | France | 5 | Q |
| 5 | Trine Schmidt | Denmark | 3 | Q |
| 6 | Belem Guerrero Méndez | Mexico | 3 | Q |
| 7 | Jianling Wang | China | 3 | Q |
| 8 | Kele Murdin | PRO | 3 | Q |
| 9 | Min Hye Lee | South Korea | 2 | Q |
| 10 | Marianne Vos | DSB | 2 | Q |
| 11 | Leire Olaberria Dorronsoro | EUS | 2 | Q |
| 12 | Elke Gebhardt | Germany | 2 | Q |
| 13 | Annalisa Cucionotta | Italy | 1 | |
| 14 | Alena Prudnikova | Russia | 1 | |
| 15 | Marlijn Binnendijk | Netherlands | 1 | |
| 16 | Kate Cullen | SCO | 0 | |
| 17 | Kelly Druyts | Belgium | 0 | |
| 18 | Gema Pascual Torrecilla | Spain | 0 | |
| 19 | Lyudmyla Vypyraylo | Ukraine | 0 | |
| 20 | Louise Moriarty | PZR | 0 | |
| 21 | Neva Day | SBW | 0 | |
| 22 | Julia Bradley | TRC | 19 | |

Results from Tissottiming.com.

Qualifying Heat 2

| Rank | Cyclist | Team | Points | Notes |
|---|---|---|---|---|
| 1 | Anastasia Chulkova | Russia | 7 | Q |
| 2 | Gina Grain | Canada | 6 | Q |
| 3 | Monia Baccaille | Italy | 5 | Q |
| 4 | Yoanka González Perez | Cuba | 5 | Q |
| 5 | Yan Li | GPC | 5 | Q |
| 6 | Pascale Jeuland | France | 3 | Q |
| 7 | Ellen van Dijk | Netherlands | 3 | Q |
| 8 | Lada Kozlíková | Czech Republic | 2 | Q |
| 9 | Rebecca Quinn | United States | 2 | Q |
| 10 | Theresa Cliff-Ryan | VBR | 2 | Q |
| 11 | Song Hee Han | South Korea | 2 | Q |
| 12 | Débora Gálves Lopez | Spain | 1 | Q |
| 13 | Alena Amialiusik | Belarus | 1 | |
| 14 | Shelley Olds | PRO | 0 | |
| 15 | Eneritz Iturriagaecheverria Mazaga | EUS | 0 | |
| 16 | Andrea Wölfer | Switzerland | 0 | |
| 17 | Eleonora Soldo | South Africa | 0 | |
| 18 | Christy King | SBW | 0 | |
| 19 | Martina Růžičková | ADP | 0 | |
| 20 | Iona Wynter | Jamaica | 0 | |
| 21 | Stephanie Rorrda | TRC | 0 | |
| 22 | Svetlana Paulikaite | Lithuania | 0 | |
| 23 | Alexandra Sontheimer | Germany | 0 | |

Results from Tissottiming.com.

=== Final ===
| Rank | Cyclist | Team | Points |
|---|---|---|---|
| 1st place, gold medalist(s) | Wan Yiu Wong | Hong Kong | 27 |
| 2nd place, silver medalist(s) | Trine Schmidt | Denmark | 23 |
| 3rd place, bronze medalist(s) | Theresa Cliff-Ryan | VBR | 22 |
| 4 | Elke Gebhardt | Germany | 22 |
| 5 | Débora Gálves Lopez | Spain | 21 |
| 6 | Cathy Moncassin Prime | France | 21 |
| 7 | Anastasia Chulkova | Russia | 15 |
| 8 | Yan Li | GPC | 11 |
| 9 | Yoanka González Perez | Cuba | 10 |
| 10 | Rebecca Quinn | United States | 8 |
| 11 | Marianne Vos | DSB | 8 |
| 12 | Ellen van Dijk | Netherlands | 6 |
| 13 | Gina Grain | Canada | 4 |
| 14 | Jarmila Machačová | Czech Republic | 3 |
| 15 | Kele Murdin | PRO | 3 |
| 16 | Song Hee Han | South Korea | 2 |
| 17 | Pascale Jeuland | France | 1 |
| 18 | Leire Olaberria Dorronsoro | EUS | 1 |
| 19 | Aksana Papko | Belarus | 0 |
| 20 | Belem Guerrero Méndez | Mexico | 0 |
| 21 | Monia Baccaille | Italy | 0 |
| 22 | Min Hye Lee | South Korea | 0 |
| 23 | Lada Kozlíková | Czech Republic | 0 |
| 24 | Jianling Wang | China | 0 |

Results from Tissottiming.com.

== World Cup Standings ==
Final standings after 4 of 4 2007–08 World Cup races.

| Rank | Cyclist | Team | Round 1 | Round 2 | Round 3 | Round 4 | Total points |
|---|---|---|---|---|---|---|---|
| 1 | Yan Li | China | 10 | | 8 | 3 | 21 |
| 2 | Jarmila Machačová | Czech Republic | 8 | | 12 | | 20 |
| 3 | Rebecca Quinn | United States | 7 | 6 | 4 | 1 | 18 |
| 4 | Marianne Vos | DSB | | 12 | 5 | | 17 |
| 5 | Katherine Bates | TMT | | 8 | 7 | | 15 |
| 6 | Wan Yiu Wong | Hong Kong | | | | 12 | 12 |
| 7 | Giorgia Bronzini | South Africa | 12 | | | | 12 |
| 8 | Yoanka González Perez | Cuba | | 10 | | 2 | 12 |
| 9 | Cathy Moncassin Prime | France | 2 | 5 | | 5 | 12 |
| 10 | Trine Schmidt | Denmark | | | | 10 | 10 |
| 11 | Min Hye Lee | South Korea | | | 10 | | 10 |
| 12 | Belinda Goss | Australia | | 7 | 3 | | 10 |
| 13 | Theresa Cliff-Ryan | VBR | | | | 8 | 8 |
| 14 | Elke Gebhardt | Germany | | | | 7 | 7 |
| 15 | Pascale Jeuland | France | 5 | 2 | | | 7 |
| 16 | Débora Gálves Lopez | Spain | | | | 6 | 6 |
| 17 | Leire Olaberria Dorronsoro | EUS | | | 6 | | 6 |
| 18 | Olga Slyusareva | Russia | 6 | | | | 6 |
| 19 | Adrie Visser | Netherlands | 3 | 3 | | | 6 |
| 20 | Anastasia Chulkova | Russia | | | | 4 | 4 |
| 21 | Sarah Hammer | United States | | 4 | | | 4 |
| 22 | Charlotte Becker | RAD | 4 | | | | 4 |
| 23 | Svetlana Pauliukaitė | Lithuania | | | 2 | | 2 |
| 24 | Marlijn Binnendijk | Netherlands | 1 | 1 | | | 2 |
| 25 | Vera Carrara Carrara | Italy | | | 1 | | 1 |

Results from Tissottiming.com.

== See also ==
- 2007–08 UCI Track Cycling World Cup Classics – Round 4 – Women's individual pursuit
- 2007–08 UCI Track Cycling World Cup Classics – Round 4 – Women's scratch
- 2007–08 UCI Track Cycling World Cup Classics – Round 4 – Women's team pursuit
- UCI Track Cycling World Cup Classics – Women's points race
