= 2008–09 UCI Track Cycling World Cup Classics – Round 5 – Women's points race =

Round 5 Women's points race
2008–2009 UCI Track Cycling World Cup Classics, race 5/5

Race details
- Dates: 14 February 2009
- Stages: 1
- Distance: 20 km (12.43 mi)
- Winning time: 25:46.071

Medalists
	Gold	Ellen van Dijk (NED)
	Silver	Katie Colclough (GBR)
	Bronze	Shelley Olds (USA)

Final race

The fifth round of the women's points race of the 2008–2009 UCI Track Cycling World Cup Classics took place in Copenhagen, Denmark on 14 February 2009. 38 athletes participated in the contest.

Ellen van Dijk won, after winning the individual pursuit World Cup race the day before, the final points race. Katie Colclough finished second and Shelley Olds third.

== Competition format ==
A points race is a race in which all riders start together and the object is to earn points during sprints or to lap the bunch.

The tournament consisted of two qualifying heats of 10 km (40 laps). The top twelve cyclist of each heat advanced to the 20 km final (80 laps).

== Schedule ==
Saturday 14 February
12:55-13:15 Qualifying, heat 1
13:15-13:35 Qualifying, heat 2
14:10-14:40 Final
15:05-15:10 Victory Ceremony

Schedule from Tissottiming.com

== Results ==
=== Qualifying ===
Qualifying Heat 1

Rank	Cyclist	Team	Points	Notes
1	Wan Yiu Wong	Hong Kong	8	Q
2	Marta Tagliaferro	Italy	5	Q
3	Debora Galvez	Spain	5	Q
4	Dalila Rodríguez Hernandez	Cuba	5	Q
5	Jarmila Machačová	Czech Republic	5	Q
6	Alexandra Greenfield	United Kingdom	4	Q
7	Leire Olaberria	EUS	3	Q
8	Ellen van Dijk	Netherlands	3	Q
9	Małgorzata Wojtyra	Poland	2	Q
10	Andrea Wölfer	Switzerland	2	Q
11	Shelley Olds	United States	1	Q
12	Katie Colclough	HPM	1	Q
13	Elissavet Chantzi	Greece	0	
14	Rebecca Quinn	SBW	0	
15	Fiona Dutriaux	France	0	
16	Kelly Druyts	Belgium	0	
17	Tatsiana Sharakova	Belarus	0	
18	Thatsani Wichana	Thailand	0	
	Jessica Fernanda Jurado	Mexico		DNS

Results from Tissottiming.com.

Qualifying Heat 2

Rank	Cyclist	Team	Points	Notes
1	Xiao Juan Diao	Hong Kong	5	Q
2	Tara Whitten	Canada	5	Q
3	Yumari González Valdivieso	Cuba	5	Q
4	Jolien D'Hoore	Belgium	5	Q
5	Elizabeth Armitstead	HPM	4	Q
6	Giorgia Bronzini	Italy	4	Q
7	Vera Koedooder	Netherlands	3	Q
8	Pascale Jeuland	France	3	Q
9	Lada Kozlíková	Czech Republic	3	Q
10	Alžbeta Pavlendová	Slovakia	2	Q
11	Gema Pascual Torrecilla	Spain	2	Q
12	Aksana Papko	Belarus	2	Q
13	Kacey Mandefield	United States	1	
14	Lucy Martin	United Kingdom	0	
15	Nontasin Chanpeng	Thailand	0	
16	Lisa Brennauer	Germany	0	
17	Edyta Jasińska	Poland	0	
	Cinthia Martinez Ponce	NAV		DNF
	Ilze Bole	South Africa		DNF

Results from Tissottiming.com.

=== Final ===
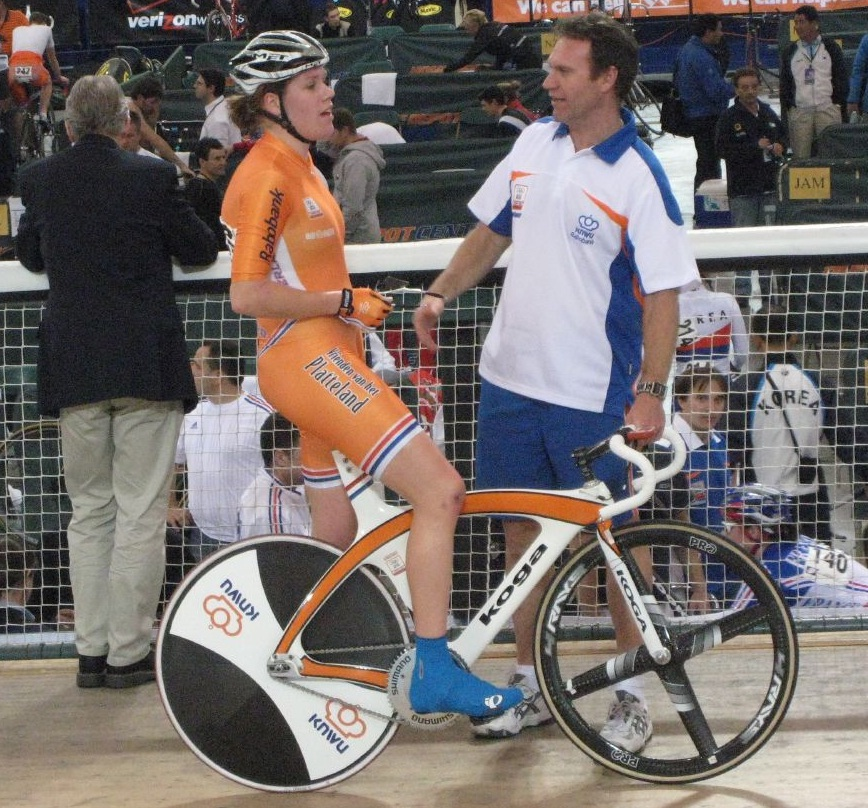
Winner Ellen van Dijk here at the 2007–08 World Cup in January 2008

Rank	Cyclist	Team	Points	Notes
1st place, gold medalist(s)	Ellen van Dijk	Netherlands	28	
2nd place, silver medalist(s)	Katie Colclough	HPM	24	
3rd place, bronze medalist(s)	Shelley Olds	United States	23	
4	Tara Whitten	Canada	22	
5	Marta Tagliaferro	Italy	22	
6	Giorgia Bronzini	Italy	21	
7	Elizabeth Armitstead	HPM	10	
8	Pascale Jeuland	France	7	
9	Andrea Wölfer	Switzerland	7	
10	Yumari González Valdivieso	Cuba	5	
11	Małgorzata Wojtyra	Poland	5	
12	Jarmila Machačová	Czech Republic	3	
13	Jolien D'Hoore	Belgium	3	
14	Lada Kozlíková	Czech Republic	3	
15	Vera Koedooder	Netherlands	2	
16	Leire Olaberria	EUS	2	
17	Gema Pascual Torrecilla	Spain	1	
18	Aksana Papko	Belarus	0	
19	Wan Yiu Wong	Hong Kong	0	
20	Debora Galvez	Spain	0	
21	Xiao Juan Diao	Hong Kong	0	
22	Dalila Rodríguez Hernandez	Cuba	0	
	Alexandra Greenfield	United Kingdom		DNF
	Alžbeta Pavlendová	Slovakia		DNF

Results from Tissottiming.com.

== World Cup Standings ==
Final standings after 5 of 5 2008–2009 World Cup races.

Rank	Cyclist	Team	Round 1	Round 2	Round 3	Round 4	Round 5	Total points
1	Giorgia Bronzini	Italy			12	8	5	25
2	Jarmila Machačová	Czech Republic	6			12		18
3	Katie Colclough	HPM	8				10	18
4	Leire Olaberria Dorronsoro	Spain	7	10				17
5	Elizabeth Armitstead	HPM	12				4	16
6	Shelley Olds	PRO	3			5	8	16
7	Tara Whitten	Canada			8		7	15
8	Belinda Goss	TOS		8		7		15
9	Ellen van Dijk	Netherlands					12	12
10	Evgenia Romanyuta	Russia		12				12
11	Yumari Gonzales Valdivieso	Cuba			10		1	11
12	Cui Wang	China				10		10
13	Lucy Martin	United Kingdom	10					10
14	Rebecca Quinn	SBW	1	7				8
15	Annalisa Cucinotta	Italy	2	6				8
16	Svetlana Paulikaite	Lithuania			5	3		8
17	Elena Chalykh	Russia			7			7
18	Marta Tagliaferro	Italy					6	6
19	Rochelle Gilmore	HPT				6		6
20	Andrea Botero	Colombia			6			6
21	Jolien D'Hoore	Belgium		5				5
22	Elke Gebhardt	Germany	5					5
23	Catherine Cheatley	New Zealand				4		4
24	Gema Pascual Torrecilla	Spain			4			4
25	Lada Kozlíková	Czech Republic		4				4
26	Wan Yiu Wong	Hong Kong	4					4
27	Andrea Wölfer	Switzerland		2			2	4
28	Pascale Jeuland	France					3	3
29	Jessica Fernanda Jurado	Mexico			3			3
30	Charlotte Becker	Germany		3				3
31	Małgorzata Wojtyra	Poland				2		2
32	Elise van Hage	Netherlands			2			2
33	Olga Slyusareva	Russia				1		1
34	Débora Gálves Lopez	Spain			1			1
35	Ah Reum Na	South Korea		1				1

Results from Tissottiming.com.

== See also ==
- 2008–2009 UCI Track Cycling World Cup Classics – Round 5 – Women's individual pursuit
- 2008–2009 UCI Track Cycling World Cup Classics – Round 5 – Women's team pursuit
- UCI Track Cycling World Cup Classics – Women's points race
