= 2008–09 UCI Track Cycling World Cup Classics – Round 5 – Women's individual pursuit =

Round 5 Women's individual pursuit
2008–2009 UCI Track Cycling World Cup Classics, race 5/5

Race details
- Dates: 13 February 2009
- Stages: 1
- Distance: 3 km (1.864 mi)
- Winning time: 3:38.870

Medalists
	Gold	Ellen van Dijk (NED)
	Silver	Tara Whitten (CAN)
	Bronze	Joanna Rowsell (GBR)

The fifth round of the women's individual pursuit of the 2008–2009 UCI Track Cycling World Cup Classics took place in Copenhagen, Denmark on 13 February 2009. 16 athletes participated in the contest.

== Competition format ==
The women's individual pursuit consists of a 3 km time trial race between two riders, starting on opposite sides of the track. If one rider catches the other, the race is over.

The tournament consisted of an initial qualifying round. The top two riders in the qualifying round advanced to the gold medal match and the third and fourth riders advanced to the bronze medal race.

== Schedule ==
Friday 13 February
12:35-13:25 Qualifying
18:40-18:55 Finals
19:55:-20:00 Victory Ceremony

Schedule from Tissottiming.com

== Results ==
=== Qualifying ===
Rank	Cyclist	Team	Time	Speed	Notes
1	Ellen van Dijk	Netherlands	3:38.145	49.508	Q
2	Tara Whitten	Canada	3:38.746	49.372	Q
3	Verena Joos	Germany	3:40.719	48.930	q
4	Joanna Rowsell	Team 100% ME	3:41.042	48.859	q
5	Dalila Rodríguez Hernandez	Cuba	3:42.791	48.475	
6	Leire Olaberria Dorronsoro	EUS	3:44.758	48.051	
7	Kimberly Geist	United States	3:45.485	47.896	
8	Jolien D'Hoore	Belgium	3:48.466	47.271	
9	Tatsiana Sharakova	Belarus	3:49.703	47.017	
10	Fiona Dutriaux	France	3:50.627	46.828	
11	Elissavet Chantzi	Greece	3:50.755	46.802	
12	Edyta Jasińska	Poland	3:50.931	46.767	
13	Laura Doria	Italy	3:51.199	46.713	
14	Martina Růžičková	Czech Republic	3:51.511	46.650	
15	Gema Pascual Torrecilla	Spain	3:54.276	46.099	
16	Nontasin Chanpeng	Thailand	4:00.168	44.968	

Results from Tissottiming.com.

=== Finals ===
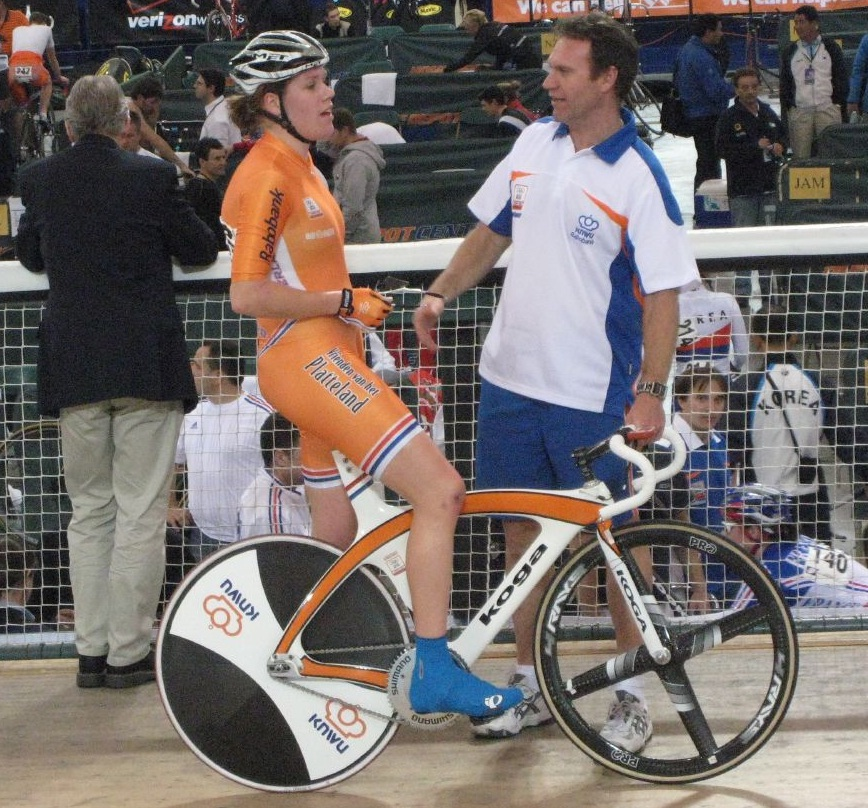
Winner Ellen van Dijk here at the 2007–08 World Cup in January 2008

==== Final bronze medal race ====
Rank	Cyclist	Team	Time	Speed
3rd place, bronze medalist(s)	Joanna Rowsell	Team 100% ME	3:40.656	48.944
4	Verena Joos	Germany	3:43.632	48.293

Results from Tissottiming.com.

==== Final gold medal race ====
Rank	Cyclist	Team	Time	Speed
1st place, gold medalist(s)	Ellen van Dijk	Netherlands	3:38.870	49.344
2nd place, silver medalist(s)	Tara Whitten	Canada	3:41.646	48.726

Results from Tissottiming.com.

== World Cup Standings ==
Final standings after 5 of 5 2008–2009 World Cup races.

Rank	Cyclist	Team	Round 1	Round 2	Round 3	Round 4	Round 5	Total points
1	Joanna Rowsell	Team 100% ME	8	12			8	28
2	Tara Whitten	Canada	10		8		10	28
3	Vilija Sereikaitė	Lithuania			12	10		22
4	Ellen van Dijk	Netherlands		7			12	19
5	Josephine Tomic	Australia		10		6		16
6	Charlotte Becker	Germany	7	6		3		16
7	Svitlana Halyuk	Ukraine	3	4		8		15
8	Dalilia Rodriguez	Cuba			7		6	13
9	Elena Chalykh	Russia			6	7		13
10	Tatsiana Sharakova	Belarus	6		5		2	13
11	Alison Shanks	New Zealand				12		12
12	Wendy Houvenaghel	United Kingdom	12					12
13	María Luisa Calle Williams	Colombia			10			10
14	Kimberly Geist	United States				5	4	9
15	Lada Kozlíková	Czech Republic		8				8
16	Leire Olaberria Dorronsoro	Spain		3			5	8
17	Jolien D'Hoore	Belgium	4	1			3	8
18	Verena Joos	Germany					7	7
19	Tess Downing	BTA		5				5
20	Pascale Jeuland	France	5					5
21	Cui Wang	China				4		4
22	Gema Pascual Torrecilla	Spain			4			4
23	Camila Pinheiro Rodrigues	Brazil			3			3
24	Edyta Jasińska	Poland	2			1		3
25	Amy Pieters	Netherlands				2		2
26	Lauren Ellis	New Zealand		2				2
27	Fiona Dutriaux	France					1	1
28	Ana Usabiaga Balerdi	EUS	1					1

Results from Tissottiming.com.

== See also ==
- 2008–2009 UCI Track Cycling World Cup Classics – Round 5 – Women's points race
- 2008–2009 UCI Track Cycling World Cup Classics – Round 5 – Women's team pursuit
- UCI Track Cycling World Cup Classics – Women's individual pursuit
