= 2008 UCI Road World Championships – Women's time trial =

Women's time trial
2008 UCI Road World Championships
- Rainbow jersey

Race details
- Dates: September 24, 2008
- Stages: 1
- Distance: 25.15 km (15.63 mi)
- Winning time: 33' 51"

Medalists
	Gold	Amber Neben (USA)
	Silver	Christiane Soeder (AUT)
	Bronze	Judith Arndt (GER)

The Women's time trial of the 2008 UCI Road World Championships cycling event took place on 24 September in Varese, Italy.

After finishing one place out of the medals in last World Championships, Amber Neben became gold medal winner, recording a time 7 seconds quicker than Austria's Christiane Soeder with Germany's Judith Arndt finishing behind Soeder in third.

== Route ==
The course covered 25.2 km.

== Qualification ==
All National Federations were allowed to enter four riders for the race, with a maximum of two riders to start. In addition to this number, the outgoing World Champion and the current continental champions were also able to take part.

Champion	Name	Note
Outgoing World Champion	(Germany) Hanka Kupfernagel (GER)	Did not participate
African Champion	(South Africa) Lynette Burger (RSA)	Did not participate
Asian Champion	Li Meifang (CHN)	Did not participate
European Champion (under-23)	(Netherlands) Ellen van Dijk (NED)	
Oceanian Champion	(Australia) Bridie O'Donnell (AUS)	
Pan American Champion	(Colombia) Ana Paola Madrinan Villegas (COL)	Did not participate

== Final classification ==
Rank	Rider	Country	Time
1	Amber Neben	United States	33' 51"
2	Christiane Soeder	Austria	+ 7"
3	Judith Arndt	Germany	+ 22"
4	Tatiana Antoshina	Russia	+ 23"
5	Kristin Armstrong	United States	+ 25"
6	Karin Thurig	Switzerland	+ 30"
7	Susanne Ljungskog	Sweden	+ 57"
8	Emma Pooley	United Kingdom	+ 57"
9	Charlotte Becker	Germany	+ 1' 03"
10	Linda Villumsen	Denmark	+ 1' 05"
11	Anne Samplonius	Canada	+ 1' 08"
12	Christine Thorburn	United States	+ 1' 17"
13	Jeannie Longo	France	+ 1' 20"
14	Emma Johansson	Sweden	+ 1' 26"
15	Diana Žiliūtė	Lithuania	+ 1' 36"
16	Vicki Whitelaw	Australia	+ 1' 36"
17	Julie Beveridge	Canada	+ 1' 53"
18	Martina Růžičková	Czech Republic	+ 2' 02"
19	Sharon Laws	United Kingdom	+ 2' 03"
20	Ellen van Dijk	Netherlands	+ 2' 11"
21	Regina Bruins	Netherlands	+ 2' 14"
22	Pascale Schnider	Switzerland	+ 2' 15"
23	Bridie O'Donnell	Australia	+ 2' 17"
24	Alex Rhodes	Australia	+ 2' 21"
25	Kirsten Wild	Netherlands	+ 2' 27"
26	Edwige Pitel	France	+ 2' 37"
27	Grete Treier	Estonia	+ 2' 40"
28	Jarmila Machačová	Czech Republic	+ 2' 46"
29	An van Rie	Belgium	+ 2' 50"
30	Marta Vilajosana Andreu	Spain	+ 2' 52"
31	Trine Schmidt	Denmark	+ 2' 59"
32	Eneritz Iturriaga Echevarria	Spain	+ 3' 04"
33	Alexandra Burchenkova	Russia	+ 3' 15"
34	Daiva Tušlaitė	Lithuania	+ 3' 20"
35	Mayuko Hagiwara	Japan	+ 3' 31"
36	Anna Zugno	Italy	+ 3' 41"
37	Elena Berlato	Italy	+ 3' 55"
38	Bogumiła Matusiak	Poland	+ 4' 22"
39	Olivia Dillon	Ireland	+ 4' 25"
40	Hanna Talkanitsa	Belarus	+ 5' 10"
41	Kathryn Bertine	Saint Kitts and Nevis	+ 5' 20"
42	Heather Wilson	Ireland	+ 5' 22"
43	Polona Batagelj	Slovenia	+ 8' 37"
