= 2008–09 UCI Track Cycling World Cup Classics – Round 5 – Women's team pursuit =

Round 5 Women's team pursuit
2008–2009 UCI Track Cycling World Cup Classics, race 5/5

Race details
- Dates: 15 February 2009
- Stages: 1
- Distance: 3 km (1.864 mi)
- Winning time: 3:27.154

Medalists
	Gold	TEAM 100% ME; Elizabeth Armitstead; Katie Colclough; Joanna Rowsell
	Silver	Netherlands; Ellen van Dijk; Vera Koedooder; Amy Pieters
	Bronze	Germany; Christina Becker; Lisa Brennauer; Verena Joos

The fifth round of the women's team pursuit of the 2008–2009 UCI Track Cycling World Cup Classics took place in Copenhagen, Denmark on 15 February 2009. 10 teams participated in the contest.

== Competition format ==
The women's team pursuit consists of a 3 km time trial race between two riders, starting on opposite sides of the track. If one team catches the other, the race is over.

The tournament consisted of an initial qualifying round. The top two riders in the qualifying round advanced to the gold medal match and the third and fourth riders advanced to the bronze medal race.

== Schedule ==
Sunday 15 February
11:35-12:35 Qualifying
16:40-16:55 Finals
17:20-17:30 Victory Ceremony

Schedule from Tissottiming.com

== Results ==
=== Qualifying ===
Rank	Team	Cyclist	Time	Speed	Notes
1	TEAM 100% ME	Elizabeth Armitstead Katie Colclough; Joanna Rowsell	3:30.730	51.250	Q
2	Netherlands	Ellen van Dijk Amy Pieters; Vera Koedooder	3:31.045	51.173	Q, NR
3	Germany	Christina Becker Lisa Brennauer; Verena Joos	3:34.165	50.428	q
4	Belgium	Jessie Daams Jolien D'Hoore; Kelly Druyts	3:36.121	49.972	q
5	Belarus	Alena Amialiusik Aksana Papko; Tatsiana Sharakova	3:36.439	49.898	
6	Cuba	Iraida Garcia Ocasio Yumari González; Dalila Rodríguez Hernandez	3:37.405	49.676	
7	United States	Kimberly Geist Kacey Mandefield; Shelley Olds	3:38.531	49.420	
8	France	Audrey Cordon Fiona Dutriaux; Pascale Jeuland	3:39.933	49.105	
9	Poland	Edyta Jasińska Dominika Maczka; Małgorzata Wojtyra	3:40.828	48.906	
10	Spain	Débora Gálves Lopez Gema Pascual Torrecilla; Ana Usabiaga Balerdi	3:49.607	47.036	

Results from Tissottiming.com.

=== Finals ===
==== Final bronze medal race ====
Rank	Team	Cyclists	Time	Speed
3rd place, bronze medalist(s)	Germany	Christina Becker Lisa Brennauer; Verena Joos	3:32.656	50.786
4	Belgium	Jessie Daams Jolien D'Hoore; Kelly Druyts	3:33.331	50.625

Results from Tissottiming.com.

==== Final gold medal race ====
Rank	Cyclist	Team	Time	Speed	Note
1st place, gold medalist(s)	HPM TEAM 100% ME	Elizabeth Armitstead Katie Colclough; Joanna Rowsell	3:27.154	52.135	
2nd place, silver medalist(s)	Netherlands	Ellen van Dijk Amy Pieters; Vera Koedooder	3:29.730	51.494	NR

Results from Tissottiming.com.

== See also ==
- 2008–2009 UCI Track Cycling World Cup Classics – Round 5 – Women's individual pursuit
- 2008–2009 UCI Track Cycling World Cup Classics – Round 5 – Women's points race
- UCI Track Cycling World Cup Classics – Women's team pursuit
