= 2007–08 UCI Track Cycling World Cup Classics – Round 4 – Women's individual pursuit =

Round 4 Women's individual pursuit
2007–08 UCI Track Cycling World Cup Classics, race 4/4

Race details
- Dates: 15 February 2008
- Stages: 1
- Distance: 3 km (1.864 mi)
- Winning time: 3:35.425

Medalists
	Gold	Rebecca Romero (GBR)
	Silver	Vilija Sereikaitė (LTU)
	Bronze	Sarah Hammer (USA)

The fourth round of the women's individual pursuit of the 2007–08 UCI Track Cycling World Cup Classics took place in Copenhagen, Denmark on 15 February 2008. 23 athletes participated in the contest.

== Competition format ==
The women's individual pursuit consists of a 3 km time trial race between two riders, starting on opposite sides of the track. If one rider catches the other, the race is over.

The tournament consisted of an initial qualifying round. The top two riders in the qualifying round advanced to the gold medal match and the third and fourth riders advanced to the bronze medal race.

== Schedule ==
Friday 15 February
11:10-12:20 Qualifying
18:40-18:55 Finals
19:55:-20:00 Victory Ceremony

Schedule from Tissottiming.com

== Results ==
=== Qualifying ===
Rank	Cyclist	Team	Time	Speed	Notes
1	Rebecca Romero	United Kingdom	3:35.786	50.049	Q
2	Vilija Sereikaitė	SAF	3:37.268	49.708	Q
3	Sarah Hammer	United States	3:38.108	49.516	q
4	Ellen van Dijk	Netherlands	3:38.110	49.516	q
5	Verena Joos	Germany	3:38.161	49.504	
6	Alison Shanks	New Zealand	3:38.476	49.433	
7	Wendy Houvenaghel	SIS	3:40.747	48.924	
8	Tara Whitten	Canada	3:42.239	48.596	
9	Karin Thürig	Switzerland	3:43.042	48.421	
10	Elena Tchalykh	Russia	3:45.551	47.882	
11	Lada Kozlíková	Czech Republic	3:46.516	47.678	
12	Cathy Moncassin Prime	France	3:48.332	47.299	
13	Leire Olaberria Dorronsoro	EUS	3:49.068	47.147	
14	Min Hye Lee	South Korea	3:49.247	47.110	
15	Svitlana Halyuk	Ukraine	3:49.288	47.102	
16	Martina Růžičková	ADP	3:50.048	46.946	
17	Tatiana Guderzo	Italy	3:51.980	46.555	
18	Svetlana Paulikaite	Lithuania	3:52.702	46.411	
19	Débora Gálves Lopez	Spain	3:53.311	46.290	
20	Julia Bradley	TRC	3:55.471	45.865	
21	Rui Juan Liu	GPC	3:59.627	45.070	
22	Elnara Musayeva	Azerbaijan	4:30.931	39.862	
	Trine Schmidt	Denmark			DNS

Results from Tissottiming.com.

=== Finals ===
==== Final bronze medal race ====
Rank	Cyclist	Team	Time	Speed
3rd place, bronze medalist(s)	Sarah Hammer	United States	3:37.086	49.749
4	Ellen van Dijk	Netherlands	3:42.194	48.606

Results from Tissottiming.com.

==== Final gold medal race ====
Rank	Cyclist	Team	Time	Speed
1st place, gold medalist(s)	Rebecca Romero	United Kingdom	3:35.425	50.133
2nd place, silver medalist(s)	Vilija Sereikaitė	SAF	3:40.161	49.055

Results from Tissottiming.com.

== World Cup Standings ==
Final standings after 4 of 4 2007–08 World Cup races.

Rank	Cyclist	Team	Round 1	Round 2	Round 3	Round 4	Total points
1	Vilija Sereikaitė	SAF	10	6	5	10	31
2	Sarah Hammer	OPC	6	8	8	8	30
3	Rebecca Romero	United Kingdom	3	10		12	25
4	Katie Mactier	Australia	12	12			24
5	Karin Thürig	Switzerland	8	7	1	2	18
6	Lesya Kalytovska	Ukraine	2	3	12		17
7	Wendy Houvenaghel	SIS	7	4		4	15
8	Verena Joos	Germany	4	5		6	15
9	Alison Shanks	New Zealand	5	2		5	12
10	María Luisa Calle Williams	Colombia	1		10		11
11	Ellen van Dijk	Netherlands			4	7	11
12	Lada Kozlíková	Czech Republic			7		7
13	Kristin Armstrong	United States			6		6
14	Tara Whitten	Canada		1	2	3	6
15	Katherine Bates	Australia			3		3
16	Elena Tchalykh	Russia				1	1

Results from Tissottiming.com.

== See also ==
- 2007–08 UCI Track Cycling World Cup Classics – Round 4 – Women's points race
- 2007–08 UCI Track Cycling World Cup Classics – Round 4 – Women's scratch
- 2007–08 UCI Track Cycling World Cup Classics – Round 4 – Women's team pursuit
- UCI Track Cycling World Cup Classics – Women's individual pursuit
