= 2008 Tour Féminin en Limousin =

Race details
- Dates: 24–27 July 2008
- Stages: 4
- Winning time: 9h 50' 34"

Results
	Winner	Natalia Boyarskaya (RUS)	(Russia national team)
	Second	Edwige Pitel (FRA)	(Team Pro Féminin Les Carroz)
	Third	Yuliya Martisova (RUS)	(Russia national team)
	Points	Natalia Boyarskaya (RUS)	(Russia national team)
	Mountains	Natalia Boyarskaya (RUS)	(Russia national team)
	Young rider	Rasa Leleivytė (LTU)	(Michela Fanini Record Rox)
	Team	Russia national team	

The 2008 Tour Féminin en Limousin was the 4th edition of the Tour Féminin en Limousin, a women's cycling stage race in France. It was rated by the UCI as category 2.2 race, and was held between 24 and 27 July 2008.

== Stages ==
=== Stage 1 ===
24 July 2008 – Limoges to Landouge, 4.6 km (2.9 mi), Individual time trial

Stage 1 Result

	Rider	Team	Time
1	Ellen van Dijk (NED)	Vrienden van het Platteland	6' 12"
2	Edwige Pitel (FRA)	Team Pro Féminin Les Carroz	+7"
3	Annemiek van Vleuten (NED)	Vrienden van het Platteland	+10"
4	Natalia Boyarskaya (RUS)	Russia national team	+12"
5	An Van Rie (BEL)	Vrienden van het Platteland	+15"

General Classification after Stage 1

	Rider	Team	Time
1	Ellen van Dijk (NED)	Vrienden van het Platteland	6' 12"
2	Edwige Pitel (FRA)	Team Pro Féminin Les Carroz	+7"
3	Annemiek van Vleuten (NED)	Vrienden van het Platteland	+10"
4	Natalia Boyarskaya (RUS)	Russia national team	+12"
5	An Van Rie (BEL)	Vrienden van het Platteland	+15"

=== Stage 2 ===
25 July 2008 – Chassenon to Chassenon, 121 km (75.2 mi)

Stage 2 Result

	Rider	Team	Time
1	Paulina Brzeźna (POL)	Poland national team	3h 21' 24"
2	Edwige Pitel (FRA)	Team Pro Féminin Les Carroz	s.t.
3	Natalia Boyarskaya (RUS)	Russia national team	s.t.
4	Rosane Kirch (BRA)	Michela Fanini Record Rox	+1' 06"
5	Rasa Leleivytė (LTU)	Michela Fanini Record Rox	+1' 35"

General Classification after Stage 2

	Rider	Team	Time
1	Edwige Pitel (FRA)	Team Pro Féminin Les Carroz	3h 27' 36"
2	Natalia Boyarskaya (RUS)	Russia national team	+26"
3	Paulina Brzeźna (POL)	Poland national team	+50"
4	Ellen van Dijk (NED)	Vrienden van het Platteland	+ 1' 32"
5	Rosane Kirch (BRA)	Michela Fanini Record Rox	+1' 33"

=== Stage 3 ===
26 July 2008 – Lauriere to Lauriere, 123 km (76.4 mi)

Stage 3 Result

	Rider	Team	Time
1	Yuliya Martisova (RUS)	Russia national team	3h 40' 12"
2	Natalia Boyarskaya (RUS)	Russia national team	+47"
3	Edwige Pitel (FRA)	Team Pro Féminin Les Carroz	+47"
4	Rasa Leleivytė (LTU)	Michela Fanini Record Rox	+4 07"
5	Tatiana Antoshina (RUS)	Russia national team	+4' 07"

General Classification after Stage 3

	Rider	Team	Time
1	Edwige Pitel (FRA)	Team Pro Féminin Les Carroz	7h 08' 25"
2	Natalia Boyarskaya (RUS)	Russia national team	+3"
3	Yulia Martisova (RUS)	Russia national team	+1' 06"
4	Paulina Brzeźna (POL)	Poland national team	+ 3' 56"
5	Rosane Kirch (BRA)	Michela Fanini Record Rox	+5' 03"

=== Stage 4 ===
27 July 2008 – Ste Feyre to Ste Feyre, 96 km (59.7 mi)

Stage 4 Result

	Rider	Team	Time
1	Natalia Boyarskaya (RUS)	Russia national team	2h 42' 19"
2	Tatiana Antoshina (RUS)	Russia national team	+1' 34"
3	Sigrid Corneo (SLO)	Ménikini Selle Italia Master Color	+1' 38"
4	Paulina Brzeźna (POL)	Poland national team	+1' 42"
5	Miho Oki (JPN)	Ménikini Selle Italia Master Color	+1' 45"

General Classification after Stage 4

	Rider	Team	Time
1	Natalia Boyarskaya (RUS)	Russia national team	9h 50' 34"
2	Edwige Pitel (FRA)	Team Pro Féminin Les Carroz	+1' 53"
3	Yuliya Martisova (RUS)	Russia national team	+3' 01"
4	Paulina Brzeźna (POL)	Poland national team	+5' 48"
5	Rosane Kirch (BRA)	Michela Fanini Record Rox	+6' 56"

== Final classifications ==
=== General classification ===
	Rider	Team	Time
1	Natalia Boyarskaya (RUS)	Russia national team	9h 50' 34"
2	Edwige Pitel (FRA)	Team Pro Féminin Les Carroz	+1' 53"
3	Yuliya Martisova (RUS)	Russia national team	+3' 01"
4	Paulina Brzeźna (POL)	Poland national team	+5' 48"
5	Rosane Kirch (BRA)	Michela Fanini Record Rox	+6' 56"
6	An Van Rie (BEL)	Vrienden van het Platteland	+7' 12"
7	Rasa Leleivytė (LTU)	Michela Fanini Record Rox	+7' 15"
8	Tatiana Antoshina (RUS)	Russia national team	+7' 16"
9	Sigrid Corneo (SLO)	Ménikini Selle Italia Master Color	+7' 24"
10	Carlee Taylor (AUS)	Australia national team	+7' 46"

=== Points classification ===
	Rider	Team	Points
1	Natalia Boyarskaya (RUS)	Russia national team	21
2	Edwige Pitel (FRA)	Team Pro Féminin Les Carroz	17
3	Martine Bras (NED)	Vrienden van het Platteland	12
4	Soreina Trachsel (SUI)	Switzerland national team	10
5	Kaytee Boyd (NZL)	New Zealand national team	8
6	Yuliya Martisova (RUS)	Russia national team	7
7	An Van Rie (BEL)	Vrienden van het Platteland	7
8	Laura Bozzolo (ITA)	Michela Fanini Record Rox	6
9	Ellen van Dijk (NED)	Vrienden van het Platteland	5
10	Paulina Brzeźna (POL)	Poland national team	4

=== Mountains classification ===
	Rider	Team	Points
1	Natalia Boyarskaya (RUS)	Russia national team	47
2	Edwige Pitel (FRA)	Team Pro Féminin Les Carroz	27
3	Rosane Kirch (BRA)	Michela Fanini Record Rox	20
4	An Van Rie (BEL)	Vrienden van het Platteland	12
5	Laura Bozzolo (ITA)	Michela Fanini Record Rox	9

=== Youth classification ===
	Rider	Team	Time
1	Rasa Leleivytė (LTU)	Russia national team	9h 57' 49"
2	Carlee Taylor (AUS)	Australia national team	+31"
3	Peta Mullens (AUS)	Australia national team	+1' 25"
4	Jennifer Hohl (SUI)	Switzerland national team	+1' 38"
5	Daiva Tušlaitė (LTU)	Michela Fanini Record Rox	+6' 20"

== See also ==
- 2008 in women's road cycling
