= 2007–08 UCI Track Cycling World Cup Classics – Round 4 – Women's team pursuit =

Round 4 Women's team pursuit
2007–2008 UCI Track Cycling World Cup Classics, race 4/4

Race details
- Dates: 17 February 2008
- Stages: 1
- Distance: 3 km (1.864 mi)
- Winning time: 3:30.685

Medalists
	Gold	Germany; Elke Gebhardt; Verena Joos; Alexandra Sontheimer
	Silver	Netherlands; Ellen van Dijk; Marlijn Binnendijk; Yvonne Hijgenaar
	Bronze	Ukraine; Svitlana Halyuk; Lyubov Shulika; Lyudmyla Vypyraylo

The fourth round of the women's team pursuit of the 2007–2008 UCI Track Cycling World Cup Classics took place in Copenhagen, Denmark on 17 February 2008. Six teams of three riders participated in the contest.

== Competition format ==
The women's team pursuit consists of a 3 km time trial race between two riders, starting on opposite sides of the track. If one team catches the other, the race is over.

The tournament consisted of an initial qualifying round. The top two riders in the qualifying round advanced to the gold medal match and the third and fourth riders advanced to the bronze medal race.

== Schedule ==
Sunday 17 February
10:40-11:20 Qualifying
16:10-16:25 Finals
16:50-17:00 Victory Ceremony

Schedule from Tissottiming.com

== Results ==
=== Qualifying ===
Rank	Team	Cyclist	Time	Speed	Notes
1	Germany	Elke Gebhardt; Verena Joos; Alexandra Sontheimer	3:33.852	50.505	Q
2	Netherlands	Ellen van Dijk; Marlijn Binnendijk; Yvonne Hijgenaar	3:36.901	49.792	Q, NR
3	Ukraine	Svitlana Halyuk; Lyubov Shulika; Lyudmyla Vypyraylo	3:38.209	49.493	q
4	Belarus	Alena Amialiusik Aksana Papko; Tatsiana Sharakova	3:39.094	49.293	q
5	South Korea	HAN Song Hee Han Min Hye Lee; Hyo Seong Noh	3:42.963	48.438	
6	Russia	Anastasiay Chulkova Alena Prudnikova; Elena Tchalykh	3:43.166	48.394	

Results from Tissottiming.com.

=== Finals ===
==== Final bronze medal race ====
Rank	Team	Cyclists	Time	Speed
3rd place, bronze medalist(s)	Ukraine	Svitlana Halyuk; Lyubov Shulika; Lyudmyla Vypyraylo	3:34.882	50.260
4	Belarus	Alena Amialiusik Aksana Papko; Tatsiana Sharakova	3:36.326	49.924

Results from Tissottiming.com.

==== Final gold medal race ====
Rank	Cyclist	Team	Time	Speed	Note
1st place, gold medalist(s)	Germany	Elke Gebhardt; Verena Joos; Alexandra Sontheimer	3:30.685	51.261	
2nd place, silver medalist(s)	Netherlands	Ellen van Dijk; Marlijn Binnendijk; Yvonne Hijgenaar	3:32.666	50.783	NR

Results from Tissottiming.com.

== See also ==
- 2007–08 UCI Track Cycling World Cup Classics – Round 4 – Women's individual pursuit
- 2007–08 UCI Track Cycling World Cup Classics – Round 4 – Women's points race
- 2007–08 UCI Track Cycling World Cup Classics – Round 4 – Women's scratch
- UCI Track Cycling World Cup Classics – Women's team pursuit
