= 2008–09 UCI Track Cycling World Cup Classics – Round 4 – Women's individual pursuit =

Round 4 Women's individual pursuit
2008–2009 UCI Track Cycling World Cup Classics, race 4/5

Race details
- Dates: 16 January 2009
- Stages: 1
- Distance: 3 km (1.864 mi)
- Winning time: 3:30.685

Medalists
	Gold	Alison Shanks (NZL)
	Silver	Vilija Sereikaitė (LTU)
	Bronze	Svitlana Halyuk (UKR)

The fourth round of the women's individual pursuit of the 2008–2009 UCI Track Cycling World Cup Classics took place in Beijing, China on 16 January 2009. 14 athletes participated in the event.

== Competition format ==
The women's individual pursuit consists of a 3 km time trial race between two riders, starting on opposite sides of the track. If one rider catches the other, the race is over.

The tournament consists of an initial qualifying round. The top two riders in the qualifying round advance to the gold medal match and the third and fourth riders advance to the bronze medal race.

== Schedule ==
Friday 16 January
11:35-12:25 Qualifying
18:40-18:55 Finals
19:55:-20:00 Victory Ceremony

Schedule from Tissottiming.com

== Results ==
=== Qualifying ===
Rank	Cyclist	Team	Time	Speed	Notes
1	Alison Shanks	New Zealand	3:31.519	51.059	Q
2	Vilija Sereikaitė	Lithuania	3:36.400	49.907	Q
3	Svitlana Halyuk	Ukraine	3:42.965	48.438	q
4	Elena Chalykh	Russia	3:44.087	48.195	q
5	Josephine Tomic	Australia	3:44.711	48.061	
6	Kimberly Geist	United States	3:48.441	47.276	
7	Cui Wang	China	3:48.617	47.240	
8	Charlotte Becker	Germany	3:49.563	47.045	
9	Amy Pieters	Netherlands	3:52.459	46.459	
10	Edyta Jasińska	Poland	3:55.006	45.956	
11	Martina Růžičková	Czech Republic	3:55.362	45.886	
12	Gema Pascual Torrecilla	Spain	4:01.358	44.746	
13	Chanpeng Nontasin	Thailand	4:01.420	44.735	
	Dalila Rodríguez Hernandez	Cuba			DNS

Results from Tissottiming.com.

=== Finals ===
==== Final bronze medal race ====
Rank	Cyclist	Team	Time	Speed
3rd place, bronze medalist(s)	Svitlana Halyuk	Ukraine	3:41.892	48.672
4	Elena Chalykh	Russia	3:42.360	48.569

Results from Tissottiming.com.

==== Final gold medal race ====
Rank	Cyclist	Team	Time	Speed
1st place, gold medalist(s)	Alison Shanks	New Zealand	3:30.685	51.261
2nd place, silver medalist(s)	Vilija Sereikaitė	Lithuania	3:37.661	49.618

Results from Tissottiming.com.

== World Cup Standings ==
General standings after 4 of 5 2008–2009 World Cup races.

Rank	Cyclist	Team	Round 1	Round 2	Round 3	Round 4	Total points
1	Vilija Sereikaitė	Lithuania			12	10	22
2	Joanna Rowsell	Team 100% ME	8	12			20
3	Tara Whitten	Canada	10		8		18
4	Josephine Tomic	Australia		10		6	16
5	Charlotte Becker	Germany	7	6		3	16
6	Svitlana Halyuk	Ukraine	3	4		8	15
7	Elena Chalykh	Russia			6	7	13
8	Alison Shanks	New Zealand				12	12
9	Wendy Houvenaghel	United Kingdom	12				12
10	Tatsiana Sharakova	Belarus	6		5		11
11	María Luisa Calle Williams	Colombia			10		10
12	Lada Kozlíková	Czech Republic		8			8
13	Dalilia Rodriguez	Cuba			7		7
14	Ellen van Dijk	Netherlands		7			7
15	Kimberly Geist	United States				5	5
16	Tess Downing	BTA		5			5
17	Pascale Jeuland	France	5				5
18	Jolien D'Hoore	Belgium	4	1			5
19	Cui Wang	China				4	4
20	Gema Pascual Torrecilla	Spain			4		4
21	Camila Pinheiro Rodrigues	Brazil			3		3
22	Leire Olaberria Dorronsoro	Spain		3			3
23	Edyta Jasińska	Poland	2			1	3
24	Amy Pieters	Netherlands				2	2
25	Lauren Ellis	New Zealand		2			2
26	Ana Usabiaga Balerdi	EUS	1				1

Results from Tissottiming.com.
