= 2008–09 UCI Track Cycling World Cup Classics – Round 3 – Women's individual pursuit =

Round 3 Women's individual pursuit
2008–2009 UCI Track Cycling World Cup Classics, race 3/5

Race details
- Dates: 11 December 2008
- Stages: 1
- Distance: 3 km (1.864 mi)
- Winning time: 3:33.307

Medalists
	Gold	Vilija Sereikaitė (LTU)
	Silver	María Luisa Calle Williams (COL)
	Bronze	Tara Whitten (CAN)

The third round of the women's individual pursuit of the 2008–2009 UCI Track Cycling World Cup Classics took place in Cali, Colombia on 11 December 2008. 8 athletes participated in the contest.

== Competition format ==
The women's individual pursuit consists of a 3 km time trial race between two riders, starting on opposite sides of the track. If one rider catches the other, the race is over.

The tournament consisted of an initial qualifying round. The top two riders in the qualifying round advanced to the gold medal match and the third and fourth riders advanced to the bronze medal race.

== Schedule ==
Friday 11 December
11:00-11:25 Qualifying
19:10-19:25 Finals
20:25:-20:30 Victory Ceremony

Schedule from Tissottiming.com

== Results ==
=== Qualifying ===
Rank	Cyclist	Team	Time	Speed	Notes
1	Vilija Sereikaitė	Lithuania	3:36.174	49.959	Q
2	María Luisa Calle Williams	Colombia	3:37.071	49.753	Q
3	Tara Whitten	Canada	3:42.050	48.637	q
4	Dalilia Rodriguez	Cuba	3:45.068	47.985	q
5	Elena Chalykh	Russia	3:46.436	47.695	
6	Tatsiana Sharakova	Belarus	3:47.427	47.487	
7	Gema Pascual Torrecilla	Spain	3:49.250	47.110	
8	Camila Pinheiro Rodrigues	Brazil	4:07.489	43.638	

Results from Tissottiming.com.

=== Finals ===
==== Final bronze medal race ====
Rank	Cyclist	Team	Time	Speed
3rd place, bronze medalist(s)	Tara Whitten	Canada	3:39.010	49.312
4	Dalilia Rodriguez	Cuba	3:44.988	48.002

Results from Tissottiming.com.

==== Final gold medal race ====
Rank	Cyclist	Team	Time	Speed
1st place, gold medalist(s)	Vilija Sereikaitė	Lithuania	3:33.307	50.631
2nd place, silver medalist(s)	María Luisa Calle Williams	Colombia	3:38.415	49.447

Results from Tissottiming.com.

== World Cup Standings ==
General standings after 3 of 5 2008–2009 World Cup races.

Rank	Cyclist	Team	Round 1	Round 2	Round 3	Total points
1	Joanna Rowsell	Team 100% ME	8	12		20
2	Tara Whitten	Canada	10		8	18
3	Charlotte Becker	Germany	7	6		13
4	Vilija Sereikaitė	Lithuania			12	12
5	Wendy Houvenaghel	United Kingdom	12			12
6	Tatsiana Sharakova	Belarus	6		5	11
7	María Luisa Calle Williams	Colombia			10	10
8	Josephine Tomic	Australia		10		10
9	Lada Kozlíková	Czech Republic		8		8
10	Dalilia Rodriguez	Cuba			7	7
11	Ellen van Dijk	Netherlands		7		7
12	Svitlana Halyuk	Ukraine	3	4		7
13	Elena Chalykh	Russia			6	6
14	Tess Downing	AUS		5		5
15	Pascale Jeuland	France	5			5
16	Jolien D'Hoore	Belgium	4	1		5
17	Gema Pascual Torrecilla	Spain			4	4
18	Camila Pinheiro Rodrigues	Brazil			3	3
19	Leire Olaberria Dorronsoro	Spain		3		3
20	Lauren Ellis	New Zealand		2		2
21	Edyta Jasińska	Poland	2			2
22	Ana Usabiaga Balerdi	EUS	1			1

Results from Tissottiming.com.
