= List of Dutch records in track cycling =

The following are the national records in track cycling in the Netherlands maintained by the Netherlands' national cycling federation, Royal Dutch Cycling Union.

== Men ==
Event	Record	Athlete	Date	Meet	Place	Ref
Flying 200 m time trial	9.086	Harrie Lavreysen	3 February 2026	European Championships	Konya, Turkey	
Flying 200 m time trial (sea level)	9.088	Harrie Lavreysen	7 August 2024	Olympic Games	Saint-Quentin-en-Yvelines, France	
250 m time trial (standing start)	17.047	Nils van 't Hoenderdaal	28 February 2018	World Championships	Apeldoorn, Netherlands	
Flying 500 m time trial	24.564	Jeffrey Hoogland	31 October 2023		Aguascalientes, Mexico	
Team sprint	40.949 WR	Jeffrey Hoogland; Harrie Lavreysen; Roy van den Berg	6 August 2024	Olympic Games	Saint-Quentin-en-Yvelines, France	
1 km time trial	55.433 WR	Jeffrey Hoogland	31 October 2023		Aguascalientes, Mexico	
1 km time trial (sea level)	57.321	Harrie Lavreysen	18 October 2024	World Championships	Ballerup, Denmark	
4000m individual pursuit	4:14.086	Brian Megens	10 February 2023	European Championships	Grenchen, Switzerland	
4000m team pursuit	3:58.230	Tim Veldt; Wim Stroetinga; Dion Beukeboom; Roy Eefting	19 February 2015	World Championships	Saint-Quentin-en-Yvelines, France	
Hour record	52.757 km	Dion Beukeboom	22 August 2018		Aguascalientes, Mexico	

== Women ==
Event	Record	Athlete(s)	Date	Meet	Place	Ref
Flying 200 m time trial	10.121	Hetty van de Wouw	2 February 2026	European Championships	Konya, Turkey	
250 m time trial (standing start)	18.881	Kimberly Karlee	22 October 2025	World Championships	Santiago, Chile	
500 m time trial	33.183	Hetty van de Wouw	15 October 2022	World Championships	Saint-Quentin-en-Yvelines, France	
500 m time trial (sea level)	33.183	Hetty van de Wouw	15 October 2022	World Championships	Saint-Quentin-en-Yvelines, France	
1 km time trial	1:03.121 WR	Hetty van de Wouw	25 October 2025	World Championships	Santiago, Chile	
Team sprint (500 m)	32.308	Laurine van Riessen; Shanne Braspennincx	2 August 2021	Olympic Games	Izu, Japan	
Team sprint (750 m)	45.283	Kimberly Kalee; Hetty van de Wouw; Steffie van der Peet	14 March 2025	Nations Cup	Konya, Turkey	
3000 m individual pursuit	3:27.802	Daniek Hengeveld	15 October 2022	World Championships	Saint-Quentin-en-Yvelines, France	
4000m individual pursuit	4:25.464	Mischa Bredewold	4 February 2026	European Championships	Konya, Turkey	
3000 m team pursuit (record progression)	3:20.013	Kirsten Wild; Vera Koedooder; Ellen van Dijk	4 August 2012	Olympic Games	London, Great Britain	
4000 m team pursuit	4:10.415	Nienke Veenhoven; Lorena Wiebes; Lisa van Belle; Sofie van Rooijen	15 October 2026	World Championships	Shanghai, China	
Hour record	49.254 km WR	Ellen van Dijk	23 May 2022		Grenchen, Switzerland	
