= 2008 UEC European Track Championships – Women's omnium =

Women's omnium
2008 European Track Championships
- UEC European Champion jersey

Race details
- Dates: 3 September 2008
- Stages: 1

Medalists
| | Gold | Elena Tchalykh (Russia) |
| | Silver | Ellen van Dijk (the Netherlands) |
| | Bronze | Anastasia Tchulkova (Russia) |

The Women's Omnium was the only elite women's events at the 2008 European Track Championships held in Pruszków, Poland and took place at 3 September. The omnium consisted of four events: elimination race, scratch race, 3000m individual pursuit and a points race. Seventeen cyclists participated in the women's omnium.

== Overall results ==
| Rank | Name | Nation | ER | SR | IP | PR | Total |
|---|---|---|---|---|---|---|---|
| 1 | Elena Tchalykh | Russia | 12 | 15 | 9 | 10 | 46 |
| 2 | Ellen van Dijk | Netherlands | 9 | 5 | 15 | 12 | 41 |
| 3 | Anastasia Tchulkova | Russia | 15 | 9 | 10 | 7 | 41 |
| 4 | Leire Olaberria Dorronsoro | Spain | 10 | 10 | 8 | 4 | 32 |
| 5 | Monia Baccaille | Italy | 7 | 8 | 6 | 9 | 30 |
| 6 | Aksana Papko | Belarus | 6 | 2 | 12 | 2 | 22 |
| 7 | Elise van Hage | Netherlands | 5 | 3 | 5 | 8 | 21 |
| 8 | Debora Galves Lopez | Spain | 1 | 12 | 3 | 5 | 21 |
| 9 | Inga Čilvinaitė | Lithuania | 0 | 1 | 4 | 15 | 20 |
| 10 | Martina Růžičková | Czech Republic | 2 | 6 | 7 | 0 | 15 |
| 11 | Anastasia Pastourmatzi | Greece | 4 | 7 | 2 | 0 | 13 |
| 12 | Giada Borgato | Italy | 8 | 0 | 1 | 0 | 9 |
| 13 | Elissavet Chantzi | Greece | 0 | 4 | 0 | 3 | 7 |
| 14 | Svetlana Pauliukaitė | Lithuania | 0 | 0 | 0 | 6 | 6 |
| 15 | Pelin Cizgin | Austria | 0 | 0 | 0 | 1 | 1 |
| 16 | Małgorzata Wojtyra | Poland | 0 | 0 | 0 | 1 | 1 |
| | Dominika Maczka | Poland | | | | | |

Results
