= Nikki Butterfield =

Australian cyclist

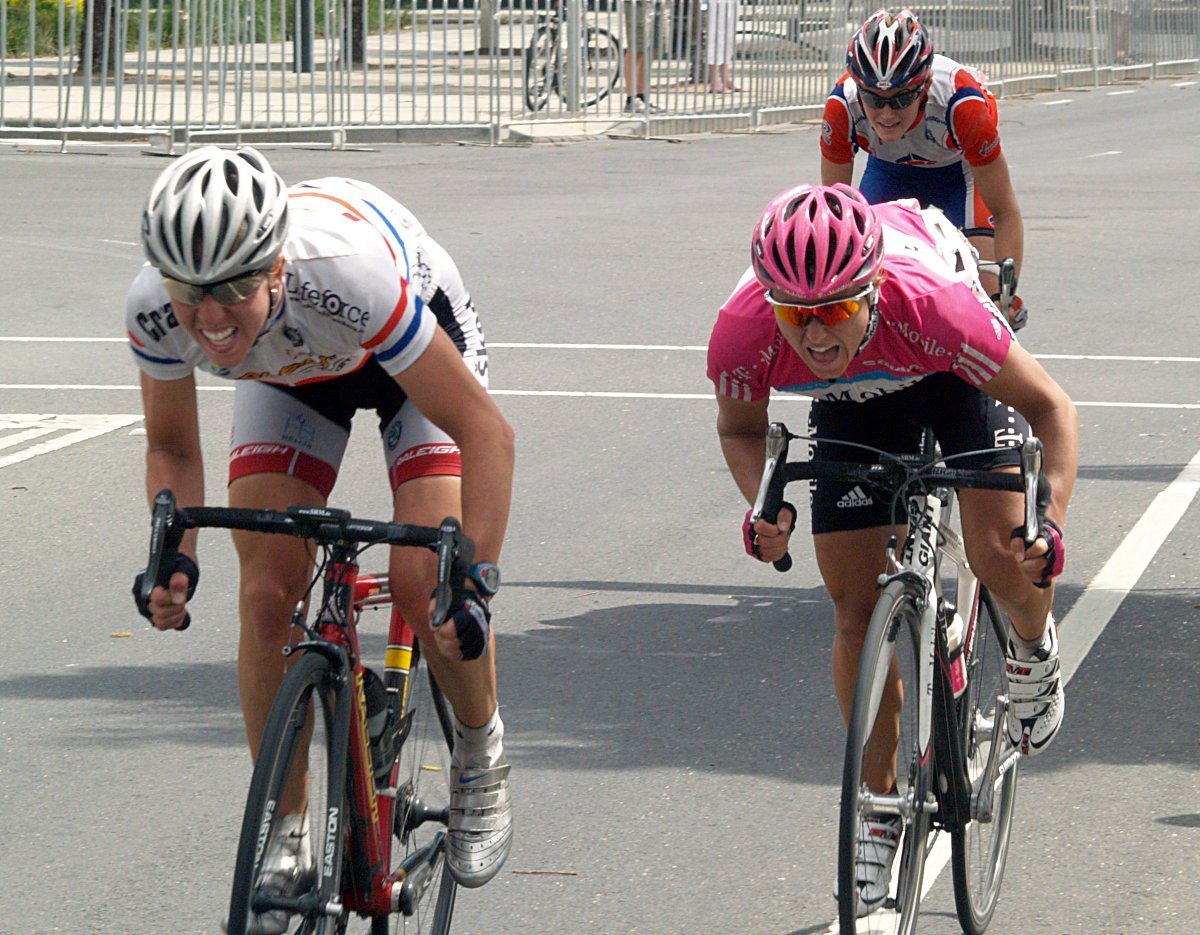
- Egyed (top right) in 2007

Personal information
- Born: Nikki Egyed; 19 April 1982 (age 44) Brisbane, Australia

Cycling career
- Sport: Cycling
- Discipline: Road cycling

Professional team
- 2008: Vrienden van het Platteland

Nikki Butterfield (née Egyed, born 19 April 1982) is a professional triathlete and former road cyclist from Australia. She represented her nation at the 2007 and 2008 UCI Road World Championships.

== Athletic career ==
Butterfield first began competing in triathlon becoming the Australian Junior Triathlon Champion in 2001 and the Under 23 World Triathlon Champion in 2003. In 2005, she switched from ITU racing to non-drafting where she raced two Ironman competitions, several half Ironman races and the 2005 ITU Long Distance Triathlon World Championships where she placed fifth. Feeling overtrained, burned out and injured she switched to cycling in 2006.

Butterfield raced as a cyclist for 4 years. In 2006, while racing in Europe, she won five races and had 15 podium placings. However, she was not selected to represent Australia at the World Championships that year due to her "lack of experience." She continued to compete in World Cup races over the next two years with some success despite battling external iliac artery endofibrosis. In 2008, she had surgery to correct this and focused on making the Australian cycling team for the 2008 Summer Olympics in Beijing. Despite strong results she was left off the Olympic team due to concern over how well she had recovered from her surgery. At the 2008 UCI Road World Championships she took 15th in the women's road race, the highest placing female Australian. The following year she was left off of the 2009 UCI World Championships. Expressing disappointment with the political process she took time off to have her first baby, Savana.

Five months after giving birth she switched back to triathlon where she took fourth place at the Hy-Vee Triathlon and then won the 2011 Ironman 70.3 Syracuse. She followed that up with a win the 2012 Abu Dhabi International Triathlon.

She made a second return to the sport in 2014, finishing third at the Ironman 70.3 Mandurah Australian Pro Championship less than 10 months after the birth of the couple's son Walker, but she subsequently announced her decision to step back from professional competition in January 2015. In July 2015 she returned to race Ironman 70.3 Racine and subsequently accepted a slot to compete at the 2015 Ironman 70.3 World Championship where she placed 17th.

== Personal ==
Butterfield is married to fellow racing cyclist and triathlete Tyler Butterfield.

== See also ==
- 2008 Vrienden van het Platteland season
