= 2008 UCI Track Cycling World Championships – Women's team pursuit =

Rainbow jersey

The Women's Team Pursuit was one of the 8 women's events at the 2008 UCI Track Cycling World Championships, held in Manchester, United Kingdom. 42 cyclists from 14 countries participated in the contest. After the qualification, the fastest two teams advanced to the final and the 3rd and 4th fastest raced for the bronze medal.

The qualification took place on 28 March and the finals were held later the same day.

== World record ==
World Record
WR	time?	team?	location?	date?

== Qualifying ==
Rank	Name	Country	1000m	2000m	Time	Speed (km/h)	Note
Rank	Name	Country	1000m	1000-2000	2000-3000	Speed (km/h)	Note
1	Wendy Houvenaghel; Rebecca Romero; Joanna Rowsell	Great Britain	1:11.910 (2)	2:18.525 (1)	3:25.725	52.497	QF
1	Wendy Houvenaghel; Rebecca Romero; Joanna Rowsell	Great Britain		1:06.615 (1)	1:07.200 (1)		
2	Svitlana Galyuk; Lesya Kalytovska; Lyubov Shulika	Ukraine	1:11.972 (4)	2:18.733 (2)	3:26.565	52.283	QF
2	Svitlana Galyuk; Lesya Kalytovska; Lyubov Shulika	Ukraine		1:06.761 (2)	1:07.832 (2)		
3	Charlotte Becker; Verena Joos; Alexandra Sontheimer	Germany	1:11.640 (1)	2:19.340 (3)	3:28.511	51.795	QB
3	Charlotte Becker; Verena Joos; Alexandra Sontheimer	Germany		1:07.700 (3)	1:09.171 (4)		
4	Alena Amialiusik; Aksana Papko; Tatsiana Sharakova	Belarus	1:11.970 (3)	2:29.878 (7)	3:30.893	51.458	QB
4	Alena Amialiusik; Aksana Papko; Tatsiana Sharakova	Belarus		1:08.326 (4)	1:09.582 (5)		
5	Anastasia Chulkova; Evgenia Romanyuta; Elena Chalykh	Russia	1:12.521 (5)	2:21.479 (6)	3:30.320	51.350	
5	Anastasia Chulkova; Evgenia Romanyuta; Elena Chalykh	Russia		1:08.958 (6)	1:08.841 (3)		
6	Marlijn Binnendijk; Ellen van Dijk; Elise van Hage	Netherlands	1:12.713 (6)	2:21.335 (5)	3:31.596	51.040	NR
6	Marlijn Binnendijk; Ellen van Dijk; Elise van Hage	Netherlands		1:08.622 (5)	1:10.261 (6)		
7	Evelyn Arys; Jessie Daams; Jolien D'Hoore	Belgium	1:14.339 (7)	2:24.951 (7)	3:35.594	50.094	
7	Evelyn Arys; Jessie Daams; Jolien D'Hoore	Belgium		1:10.612 (7)	1:10.643 (7)		

== Finals ==
Rank	Name	Country	1000m	2000m	Time	Speed (km/h)
Rank	Name	Country	1000m	1000-2000	2000-3000	Speed (km/h)
Gold Medal Race
	Wendy Houvenaghel; Rebecca Romero; Joanna Rowsell	Great Britain	1:10.405 (2)	2:16.084 (1)	3:22.415	56.355
	Wendy Houvenaghel; Rebecca Romero; Joanna Rowsell	Great Britain		1:05.679 (1)	1:06.331 (1)	
	Svitlana Galyuk; Lesya Kalytovska; Lyubov Shulika	Ukraine	1:10.126 (1)	2:16.985 (2)	3:29.744	51.491
	Svitlana Galyuk; Lesya Kalytovska; Lyubov Shulika	Ukraine		1:06.589 (2)	1:12.759 (2)	
Bronze Medal Race
	Charlotte Becker; Verena Joos; Alexandra Sontheimer	Germany	1:11.652 (1)	2:18.907 (1)	3:26.960	52.183
	Charlotte Becker; Verena Joos; Alexandra Sontheimer	Germany		1:07.255 (1)	1:08.053 (1)	
4	Alena Amialiusik; Aksana Papko; Tatsiana Sharakova	Belarus	1:11.887 (2)	2:19.862 (2)	3:29.449	51.563
4	Alena Amialiusik; Aksana Papko; Tatsiana Sharakova	Belarus		1:07.975 (2)	1:09.587 (2)	
