= Lorian Graham =

Australian cyclist

Personal information
- Full name: Lorian Graham
- Born: 8 November 1977 (age 48)

Cycling career
- Sport: Cycling
- Role: Rider

Lorian Graham (born 8 November 1977) is a former Australian racing cyclist. She won the Australian national road race title in 2005.

== See also ==
- 2008 Vrienden van het Platteland season
