= 2008 European Road Championships – Women's under-23 road race =

Women's Road Race
2008 European Road Championships
- UEC European Champion jersey

Race details
- Dates: 5 July
- Stages: 1
- Distance: 129.6 km (80.53 mi)
- Winning time: 3h 30' 58"

Results
	Winner	Rasa Leleivytė (Lithuania)
	Second	Lesya Kalytovska (Ukraine)
	Third	Lisa Brennauer (Germany)

The Women's U23 road race at the 2008 European Road Championships took place on July 5. The Championships were hosted in Italy. The course was 129.6 km long, started in Pallanza at 09:00 and finished in Verbania.

== Final classification ==
Rank	Rider	Time
1st place, gold medalist(s)	Rasa Leleivytė (LTU)	3h 30m 58s
2nd place, silver medalist(s)	Lesya Kalytovska (UKR)	s.t.
3rd place, bronze medalist(s)	Lisa Brennauer (GER)	s.t.
4	Regina Bruins (NED)	s.t.
5	Julie Krasniak (FRA)	s.t.
6	Oxana Kozonchuk (RUS)	s.t.
7	Lieselot Decroix (BEL)	s.t.
8	Anna Sanchis Chafer (ESP)	s.t.
9	Svitlana Halyuk (UKR)	s.t.
10	Daiva Tušlaitė (LTU)	+ 8"
11	Inga Čilvinaitė (LTU)	+ 27"
12	Andrea Wölfer (SUI)	+ 27"
13	Catrine Josefsson (SWE)	+ 27"
14	Aksana Papko (BLR)	+ 27"
15	Amélie Rivat (FRA)	+ 27"
16	Elena Berlato (ITA)	+ 27"
17	Jennifer Hohl (SUI)	+ 27"
18	Alena Amialiusik (BLR)	+ 27"
19	Irina Molicheva (RUS)	+ 27"
20	Marie Lindberg (SWE)	+ 27"
21	Alyona Andruk (UKR)	+ 27"
22	Stephanie Pohl (GER)	+ 27"
23	Daria Popova (RUS)	+ 27"
24	Olena Sharha (UKR)	+ 27"
25	Amilie Aubry (SUI)	+ 27"
26	Emilie Aubry (SUI)	+ 27"
27	Alexandra Burchenkova (RUS)	+ 1' 54"
28	Kelly Druyts (BEL)	+ 2' 59"
29	Marlen Johrend (GER)	+ 2' 59"
30	Jarmila Machakova (CZE)	+ 2' 59"
31	Ellen van Dijk (NED)	+ 2' 59"
32	Corinna Thumm (GER)	+ 2' 59"
33	Suzanne van Veen (NED)	+ 2' 59"
34	Magdalena Pyrgies (POL)	+ 2' 59"
35	Mélanie Bravard (FRA)	+ 2' 59"
36	Agnieszka Ryczek (POL)	+ 2' 59"
37	Laura Lepasalu (EST)	+ 2' 59"
38	Romy Kasper (GER)	+ 2' 59"
39	Denise Zuckermandel (GER)	+ 3' 02"

s.t. = same time
