= Dutch record progression track cycling – Women's team pursuit =

Overview of the progression of Dutch track cycling record of the women's team pursuit

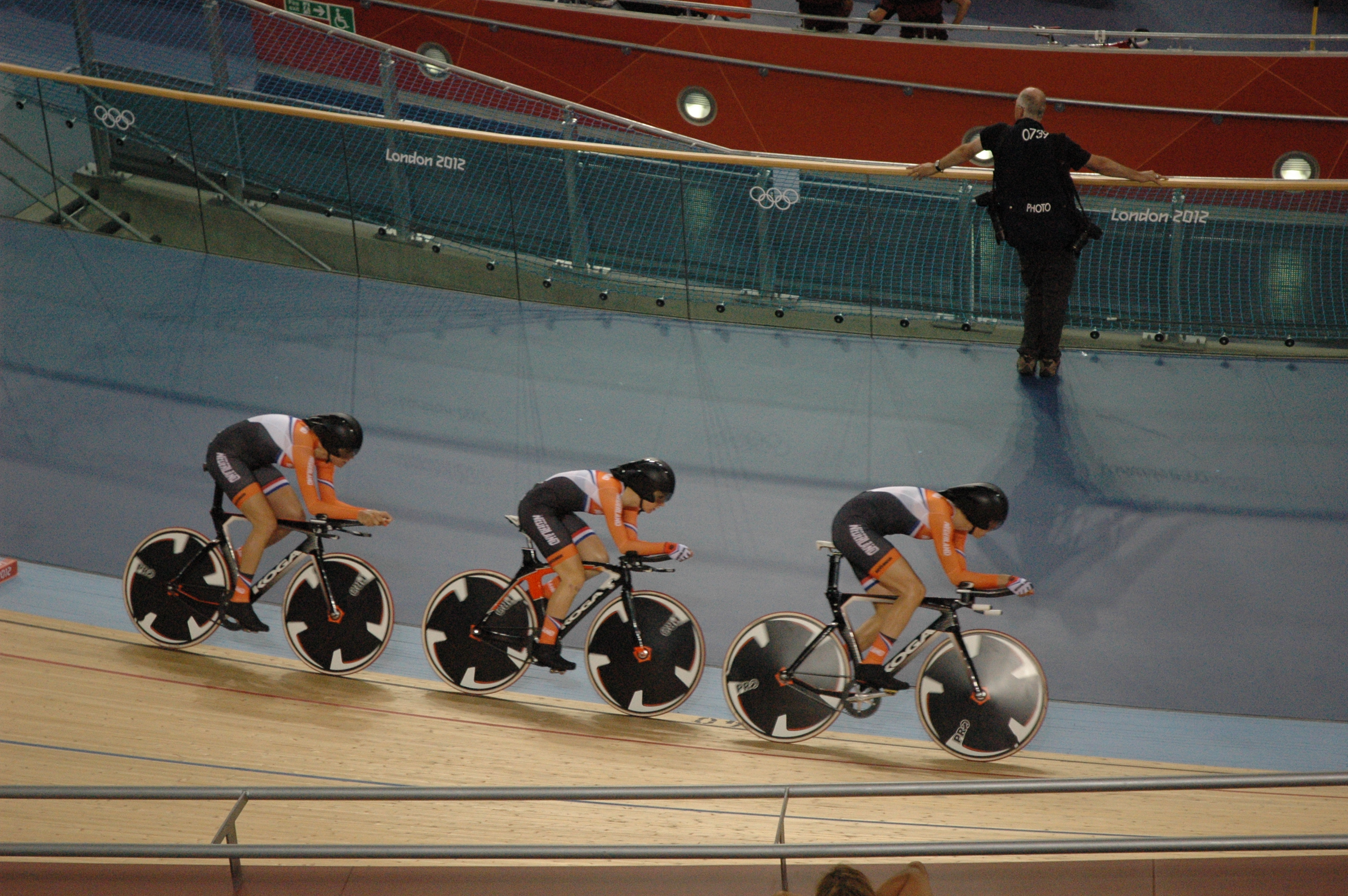
Ellen van Dijk, Kirsten Wild and Vera Koedooder rode the current record at the 2012 Summer Olympics.

This is an overview of the progression of the Dutch track cycling record of the women's team pursuit.

The women's 3000m team pursuit track cycling discipline was introduced by the UCI at the 2007–08 track cycling season. The Dutch team consisting of Ellen van Dijk, Marlijn Binnendijk and Yvonne Hijgenaar rode the team pursuit for the first time at round 4 at the 2007–08 UCI Track Cycling World Cup in Copenhagen in a time of 3:36.901 (49.792 km/h). They broke the record later that day. After have ridden the team pursuit for the first time, the record has been broken nine times. Ellen van Dijk is the only woman who always has been part of the squad when a record was broken. The current record was settled during the 2012 Summer Olympics by Ellen van Dijk, Kirsten Wild and Vera Koedooder in a time of 3:20.013 (53.996 km/h) on 4 August 2012. After the 2011–12 track cycling season the UCI changed the discipline into a 4000 m team pursuit with 4 riders.

== Progression ==
=== 3000 m team pursuit with three riders (2007–2012) ===
Time	Speed (km/h)	Cyclists	Event	Location of race	Date	Ref
3:36.901	49.792	Ellen van Dijk; Marlijn Binnendijk; Yvonne Hijgenaar	2007–08 UCI Track Cycling World Cup Classics – round 4 (qualification)	(Denmark) Copenhagen	17 February 2008	
3:32.666	50.783	Ellen van Dijk; Marlijn Binnendijk; Yvonne Hijgenaar	2007–08 UCI Track Cycling World Cup Classics – round 4 (gold-medal race)	(Denmark) Copenhagen	17 February 2008	
3:31.596	51.040	Ellen van Dijk; Marlijn Binnendijk; Elise van Hage	2008 UCI Track Cycling World Championships (qualifying)	(United Kingdom) Manchester	28 March 2008	
3:31.045	51.250	Ellen van Dijk; Amy Pieters; Vera Koedooder	2008–09 UCI Track Cycling World Cup Classics – round 5 (qualification)	(Denmark) Copenhagen	15 February 2009	
3:29.730	51.494	Ellen van Dijk; Amy Pieters; Vera Koedooder	2008–09 UCI Track Cycling World Cup Classics – round 5 (gold-medal race)	(Denmark) Copenhagen	15 February 2009	
3:29.379	51.581	Ellen van Dijk; Amy Pieters; Vera Koedooder	2009 UCI Track Cycling World Championships (bronze-medal race)	(Poland) Pruszków	26 March 2009	
3:25.156	52.642	Ellen van Dijk; Amy Pieters; Vera Koedooder	2010 UCI Track Cycling World Championships (qualifying)	(Denmark) Ballerup	25 March 2010	
3:23.179	53.155	Ellen van Dijk; Kirsten Wild; Vera Koedooder	2010–11 UCI Track Cycling World Cup Classics – round 4 (qualifying)	(United Kingdom) Manchester	18 February 2011	
3:21.550	53.584	Ellen van Dijk; Kirsten Wild; Amy Pieters	2011–12 UCI Track Cycling World Cup – round 1 (gold-medal race)	(Kazakhstan) Astana	4 November 2011	
3:20.013	53.996	Ellen van Dijk; Kirsten Wild; Vera Koedooder	2012 Summer Olympics (first round)	(United Kingdom) London	4 August 2012	

=== 4000 m team pursuit with four riders (from 2012) ===
After 2012 Ellen van Dijk stopped riding on the track, focussing on the road. Because Van Dijk was the most important rider for the team and because the team needs an addition rider, the national coach and technical director decided not to have a Dutch women's team pursuit team. For that reason there is not yet an official 4000 m team pursuit national record.

== See also ==
- Dutch records in track cycling
