= Edwige Pitel =

French cyclist (born 1967)

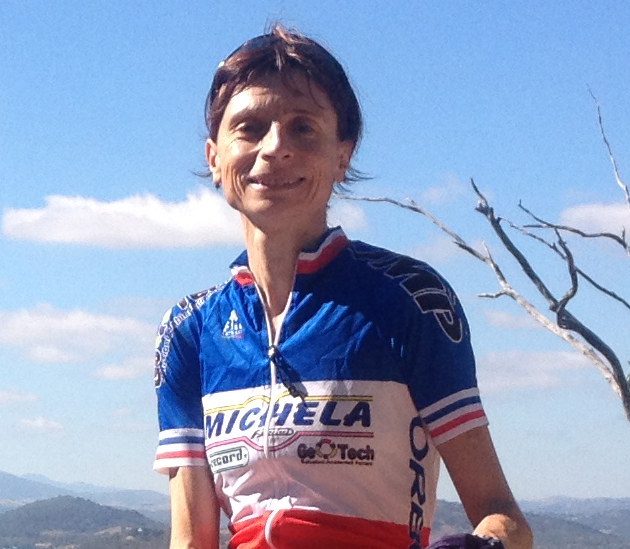
- Pitel in 2017

Personal information
- Full name: Edwige Pitel
- Born: 4 June 1967 (age 59) Dinan, France

Cycling career
- Sport: Cycling
- Discipline: Road
- Role: Rider

Professional teams
- 2005: Univega Pro Cycling Team
- 2006: Bianchi Alverti Kookai
- 2007: Team Uniqa Graz
- 2008: Pro Feminin Les Carroz
- 2010: SC Michela Fanini Record Rox
- 2011: Vienne Futuroscope
- 2013–2016: S.C. Michela Fanini Rox
- 2018–2020: Cogeas–Mettler Pro Cycling Team

Major wins
- Stage races Tour de Bretagne (2003) Tour Féminin en Limousin (2005) One day races and Classics Chrono des Herbiers (2001, 2004, 2005) National Time Trial Championships (2004, 2005) National Road Race Championships (2007, 2016)
Medal record
Representing France
Women's Duathlon
ITU Duathlon World Championships
| Gold medal – first place | 2003 | Individual |

Edwige Pitel (born 4 June 1967) is a French racing cyclist, who most recently rode for UCI Women's Continental Team Cogeas–Mettler–Look. Pitel was the winner of the 2003 ITU Duathlon World Championships.

Pitel earned a PhD from Imperial College London in 1994 under the supervision of Peter G. Harrison for a thesis titled Queues with negative customers.

== Major results ==
2001
1st Chrono des Nations
2002
National Road Championships

2nd Road race
3rd Time trial

2003
National Road Championships

2nd Time trial
11th Road race

1st Overall Tour de Bretagne Féminin
2004
National Road Championships

1st Time trial
6th Road race

1st Chrono des Nations
4th Gran Premio Brissago Lago Maggiore
6th GP de Plouay – Bretagne
2005
National Road Championships

1st Time trial
4th Road race

1st Overall Tour Féminin en Limousin

1st Stage 3b (ITT)

1st Chrono des Nations
2nd Overall Grande Boucle Féminine Internationale

1st Stage 3

2nd Overall Trophée d'Or Féminin
5th Souvenir Magali Pache Lausanne
10th Overall Tour de l'Aude Cycliste Féminin
10th GP de Plouay – Bretagne
2006
2nd National Time trial Championships
4th Souvenir Magali Pache Lausanne
5th Ronde van Vlaanderen
6th Chrono des Nations
8th Overall Le Tour du Grand Montreal
9th Gran Premio Castilla y Leon
9th Montreal World Cup
2007
National Road Championships

1st Road race
3rd Time trial

2nd Trophée des Grimpeurs
3rd Overall Tour de Feminin-O cenu Českého Švýcarska
4th Overall Tour de PEI
5th Overall Vuelta Ciclista Femenina a El Salvador
8th Overall Thüringen Rundfahrt der Frauen
8th Overall Giro del Trentino Alto Adige-Südtirol
9th Overall Tour de Berne
9th Chrono des Nations
10th Souvenir Magali Pache Lausanne
2008
National Road Championships

3rd Road race
3rd Time trial

2nd Overall Tour Féminin en Limousin
3rd Overall Route de France Féminine
3rd Overall Trophée d'Or Féminin
4th Memorial Davide Fardelli (ITT)
6th Overall Tour de Bretagne Féminin
7th Chrono des Nations
7th Prijs Stad Roeselare
8th Overall Tour Cycliste Féminin International de l'Ardèche
2009
National Road Championships

2nd Time trial
5th Road race

2nd Overall Tour de Feminin-O cenu Českého Švýcarska
2nd Trophée des Grimpeurs
4th Memorial Davide Fardelli – Cronometro Individuale (ITT)
5th Overall Tour de Bretagne Féminin
5th Chrono des Nations
7th Gran Premio Brissago Lago Maggiore
9th Grand Prix de Suisse (ITT)
2010
National Road Championships

2nd Time trial
5th Road race

3rd Overall Tour Féminin en Limousin
3rd Chrono des Nations (ITT)
8th Grand Prix de Suisse (ITT)
2011
5th National Time trial Championships
10th Chrono Gatineau (ITT)
2012
1st Memorial Davide Fardelli – Cronometro Individuale (ITT)
3rd National Time trial Championships
3rd Chrono des Nations (ITT)
6th Overall La Route de France
10th Overall Tour de Bretagne Féminin
2013
National Road Championships

6th Time trial
9th Road race

3rd Overall Tour Féminin en Limousin
5th Chrono des Nations (ITT)
7th Overall Tour Languedoc Roussillon
9th Overall Gracia–Orlová
2014
2nd Giro dell'Emilia Internazionale Donne Elite
3rd Overall Tour Cycliste Féminin International de l'Ardèche
4th Chrono des Nations (ITT)
5th National Time trial Championships
6th Grand Prix de Plumelec-Morbihan Dames
9th Overall Premondiale Giro Toscana Int. Femminile
10th Overall Gracia–Orlová
2015
2nd Overall Trophée d'Or Féminin
2nd Frauen Grand Prix Gippingen
4th National Time trial Championships
7th Overall Premondiale Giro Toscana Int. Femminile
7th Giro dell'Emilia Internazionale Donne Elite
10th Chrono des Nations (ITT)
2016
National Road Championships

1st Road race
2nd Time trial

3rd Overall Tour Cycliste Féminin International de l'Ardèche

1st Points classification
1st Stage 5 (ITT)

4th Overall Giro del Trentino Alto Adige-Südtirol
2017
5th Chrono des Nations (ITT)
2018
4th Overall Tour of the Gila

1st Mountain classification

5th Overall Joe Martin Stage Race
8th Chrono des Nations (ITT)
2019
5th Overall Tour of the Gila
9th Overall Colorado Classic
9th Winston-Salem Cycling Classic
10th Chrono des Nations (ITT)
