= Team Pro Feminin Les Carroz =

French cycling team

Team information
- UCI code: TPF (2008)
- Registered: France
- Founded: 2008
- Disbanded: 2008
- Discipline: Road
- Status: UCI Women's Team

Key personnel
- General manager: Gwenael Ruau
- Team manager: Alain Berger

Team name history
- 2008: Team Pro Feminin Les Carroz

Team Pro Feminin Les Carroz (UCI team code: TLG) was a French professional cycling team, which competed in elite road bicycle racing events such as the UCI Women's Road World Cup.

== National champions ==
2008
France Road Race, Jeannie Longo-Ciprelli
France Time Trial, Jeannie Longo-Ciprelli
