= 2008 European Road Championships – Women's under-23 time trial =

Women's U23 individual time trial
2008 European Road Championships

Race details
- Dates: 3 July 2008 in Pettenasco (ITA)
- Stages: 1
- Distance: 25.3 km (15.72 mi)
- Winning time: 32' 33"

Results
| | Winner | Ellen van Dijk (NED) | (Netherlands) |
| | Second | Svitlana Halyuk (UKR) | (Ukraine) |
| | Third | Lesya Kalytovska (UKR) | (Ukraine) |

The women's U23 individual time trial at the 2008 European Road Championships took place on 3 July. The championships were hosted by the Italian city of Pettenasco. The course was 28.1 km long, started in Pettenasco and finished in Stresa.

Dutchwoman Ellen van Dijk won the time trial. Van Dijk completed the 25-kilometre course in a time of 32:33, beating Svitlana Halyuk and Lesya Kalytovska, both from Ukraine.

== Final classification ==
| Rank | Rider | Time | Time behind |
|---|---|---|---|
| 1st place, gold medalist(s) | Ellen van Dijk (NED) | 32m 33s | |
| 2nd place, silver medalist(s) | Svitlana Halyuk (UKR) | 32m 38s | + 5s |
| 3rd place, bronze medalist(s) | Lesya Kalytovska (UKR) | 32m 41s | + 8s |
| 4 | Alexandra Burchenkova (RUS) | 32m 51s | + 18s |
| 5 | Regina Bruins (NED) | 32m 57s | + 24s |
| 6 | Aušrinė Trebaitė (LTU) | 33m 34s | + 1m 01s |
| 7 | Daiva Tušlaitė (LTU) | 33m 42s | + 1m 09s |
| 8 | Martina Sáblíková (CZE) | 33m 4?s | + 1m ??s |
| 9 | Lisa Brennauer (GER) | 33m 46s | + 1m 13s |
| 10 | Victoria Kondel (RUS) | 33m 48s | + 1m 15s |
| 11 | Stephanie Pohl (GER) | 33m 50s | + 1m 17s |
| 12 | Jamila Machacova (CZE) | 33m 55s | + 1m 22s |
| 13 | Hanne Talikanista (BLR) | 33m 57s | + 1m 24s |
| 14 | Audrey Cordon (FRA) | 33m 5?s | + 1m 2?s |
| 15 | Inga Čilvinaitė (LTU) | 34m 00s | + 1m 27s |
| 16 | Fabienne Sommer (SUI) | 34m 04s | + 1m 31s |
| 17 | Catrine Josefsson (SWE) | 34m 12s | + 1m 39s |
| 18 | Elise van Hage (NED) | 34m 14s | + 1m 41s |
| 19 | Elena Berlato (ITA) | 34m 20s | + 1m 47s |
| 20 | Oxana Kozonchuck (RUS) | 34m 24s | + 1m 51s |
