= Theresa Cliff-Ryan =

American cyclist and roller skater

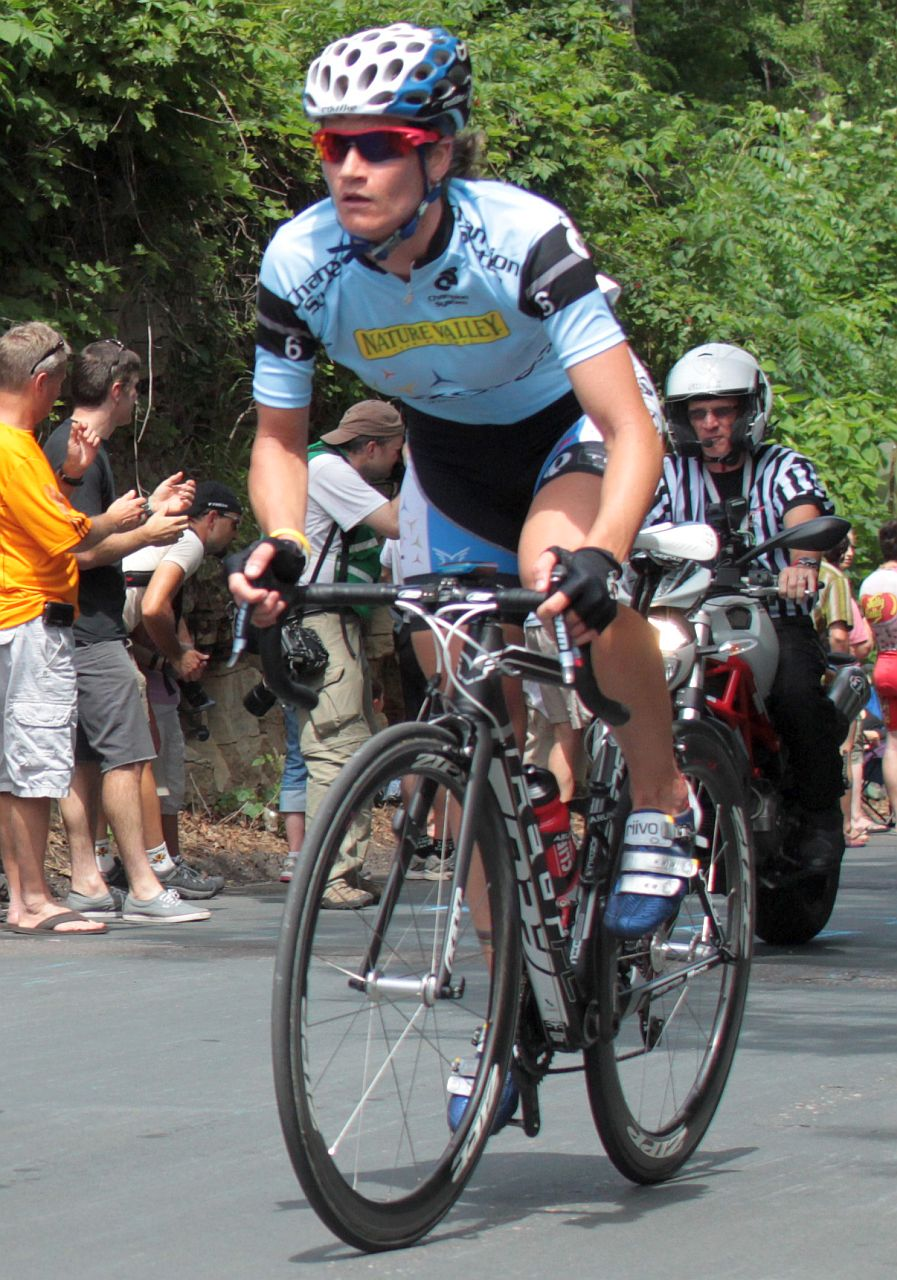
- Cliff-Ryan in 2012

Personal information
- Born: June 19, 1978 (age 48) United States

Cycling career
- Sport: Cycling
- Discipline: Road cycling

Professional teams
- 2008: Verducci Breakaway Racing
- 2011: Forno D'Asolo Colavita
Medal record
Women's roller skating
Representing United States
Pan American Games
Gold medal – first place	1999 Winnipeg	Combined long distance
Women's road bicycle racing
Representing United States
Pan American Championships
Bronze medal – third place	2011 Medellín	Road race

Theresa Cliff-Ryan (born June 19, 1978) is a road cyclist and former roller skater from the United States. She participated at the 2010 UCI Road World Championships and 2011 UCI Road World Championships.
