= Alexandra Sontheimer =

German cyclist (born 1987)

Personal information
- Born: 15 June 1987 (age 39) Freiburg im Breisgau, Germany

Cycling career
- Sport: Cycling
- Disciplines: Track; Road
- Role: Rider
Medal record
Women's track cycling
Representing Germany
World Championships
Bronze medal – third place	2008 Manchester	Team pursuit

Alexandra Sontheimer (born 15 June 1987) is a German former professional track cyclist. She won a bronze medal in the team pursuit at the 2008 UCI Track Cycling World Championships.
