= An Van Rie =

Belgian cyclist

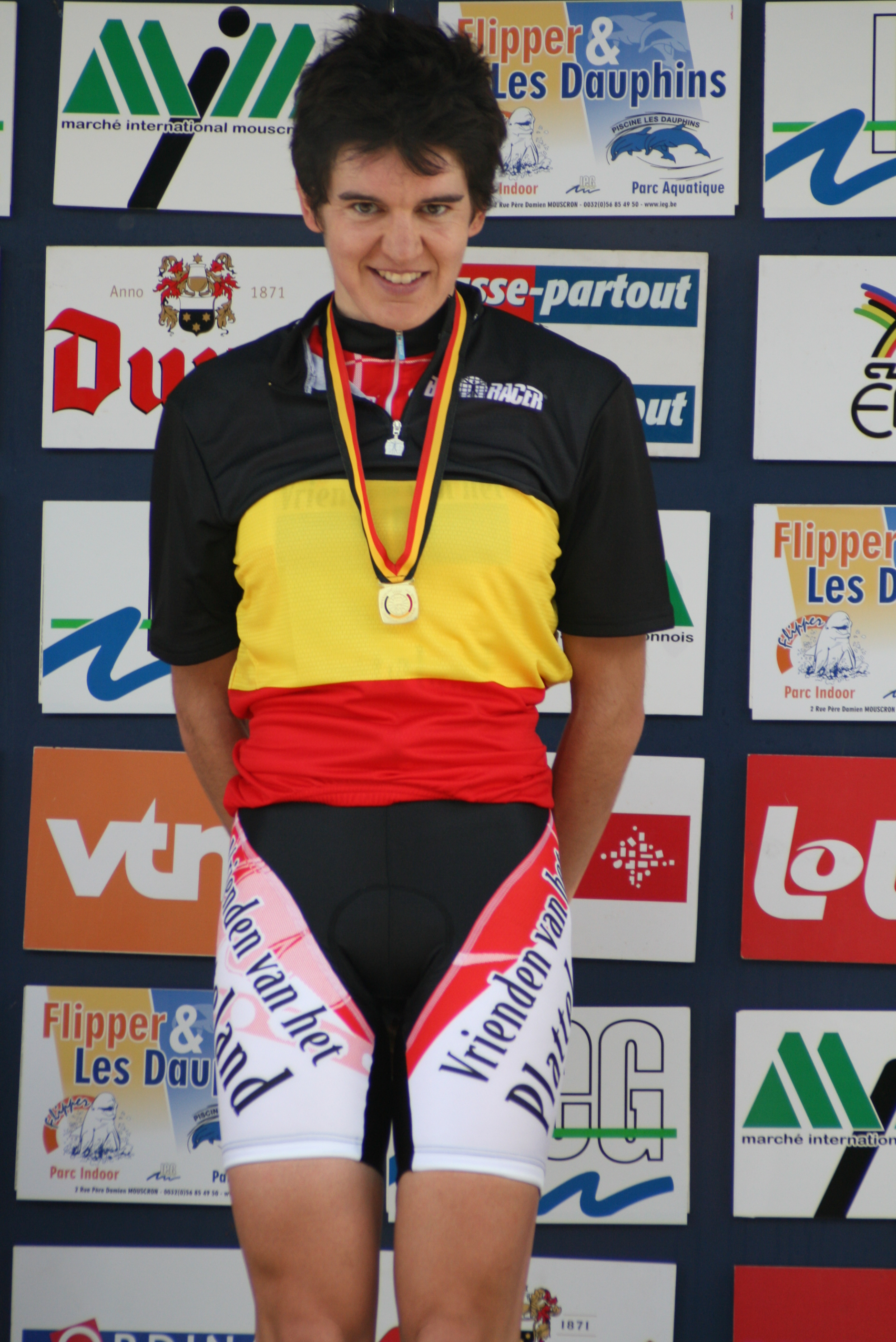

Personal information
- Full name: An Van Rie
- Born: 9 June 1974 (age 52) Menen, Belgium

Cycling career
- Sport: Cycling
- Discipline: Road
- Role: Rider
- Rider type: Time triallist

Professional teams
- 2006: Lotto–Belisol Ladiesteam (BEL)
- 2007: AA-Drink Cycling Team (NED)
- 2008: Vrienden van het Platteland (NED)

Major wins
- (Belgium) National TT Champion (2006–2008)

An Van Rie (born 9 June 1974) is a racing cyclist who was born in Menen, Belgium.

== Major results ==
2005
2nd Belgian National Time Trial Championships

2006 (Lotto–Belisol Ladiesteam)
1st (Belgium) Belgian National Time Trial Championships
10th La Flèche Wallonne Féminine

2007
1st (Belgium) Belgian National Time Trial Championships

2008 (Vrienden van het Platteland)
1st (Belgium) Belgian National Time Trial Championships
3rd Stage 1, Tour de Pologne Feminin, Poddebice
8th Omloop Het Volk
