= Elke Gebhardt =

German cyclist

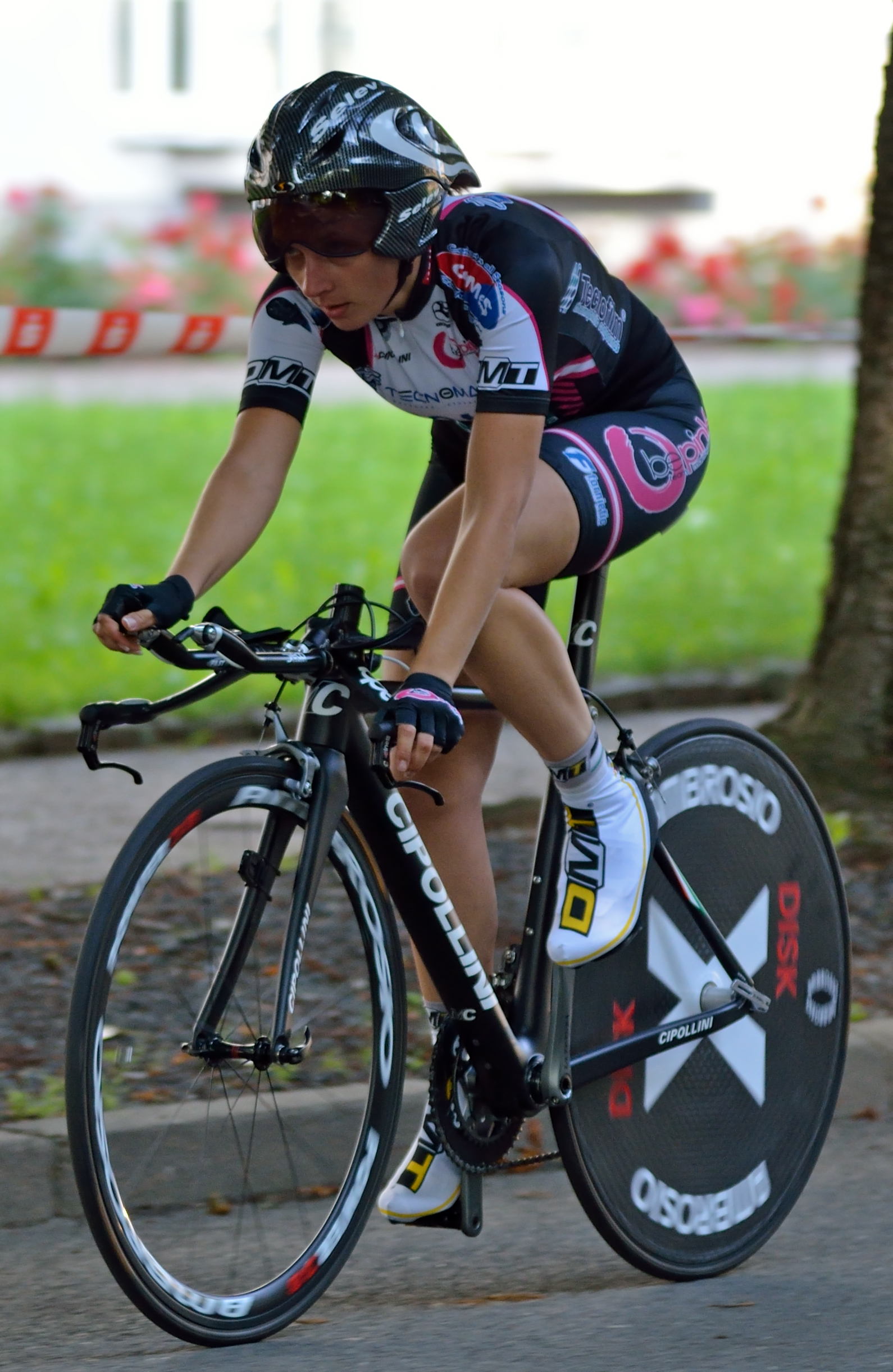
- Gebhardt in 2012

Personal information
- Born: 22 July 1983 (age 43) Freiburg im Breisgau, Germany

Cycling career
- Sport: Cycling
- Role: Rider

Elke Gebhardt (born 22 July 1983) is a German former racing cyclist. She competed in the 2013 UCI women's road race in Florence.

== See also ==
- 2009 DSB Bank-LTO season
- 2013 Team Argos-Shimano season
