= Débora Gálves Lopez =

Spanish cyclist (born 1985)

Debora Galves Lopez
Personal information
- Born: 17 May 1985 (age 41) Las Palmas, Spain

Cycling career
- Sport: Cycling
- Disciplines: Road cycling Track cycling

Professional teams
- 2010: Lointek
- 2011: Debabarrena-Gipuzkoa

Debora Galves Lopez (born 17 May 1985) is a track cyclist and road cyclist from Spain. She represented her nation at the 2009 UCI Road World Championships in the Women's time trial. She competed in the scratch event at the 2011 UCI Track Cycling World Championships and in the individual pursuit event at the 2010 UCI Track Cycling World Championships.
