= Gema Pascual =

Spanish cyclist

Gema Pascual Torrecilla
Personal information
- Born: 12 January 1979 (age 47) Madrid, Spain

Cycling career
- Sport: Cycling
- Disciplines: Road cycling, Track cycling

Professional teams
- 2001: Alkon–Groupbike
- 2004-2011: Bizkaia–Durango

Gema Pascual Torrecilla (born 12 January 1979) is a track and road cyclist from Spain. She represented her nation at the 2004 Summer Olympics in the Women's points race.
