= Elena Tchalykh =

Russian cyclist

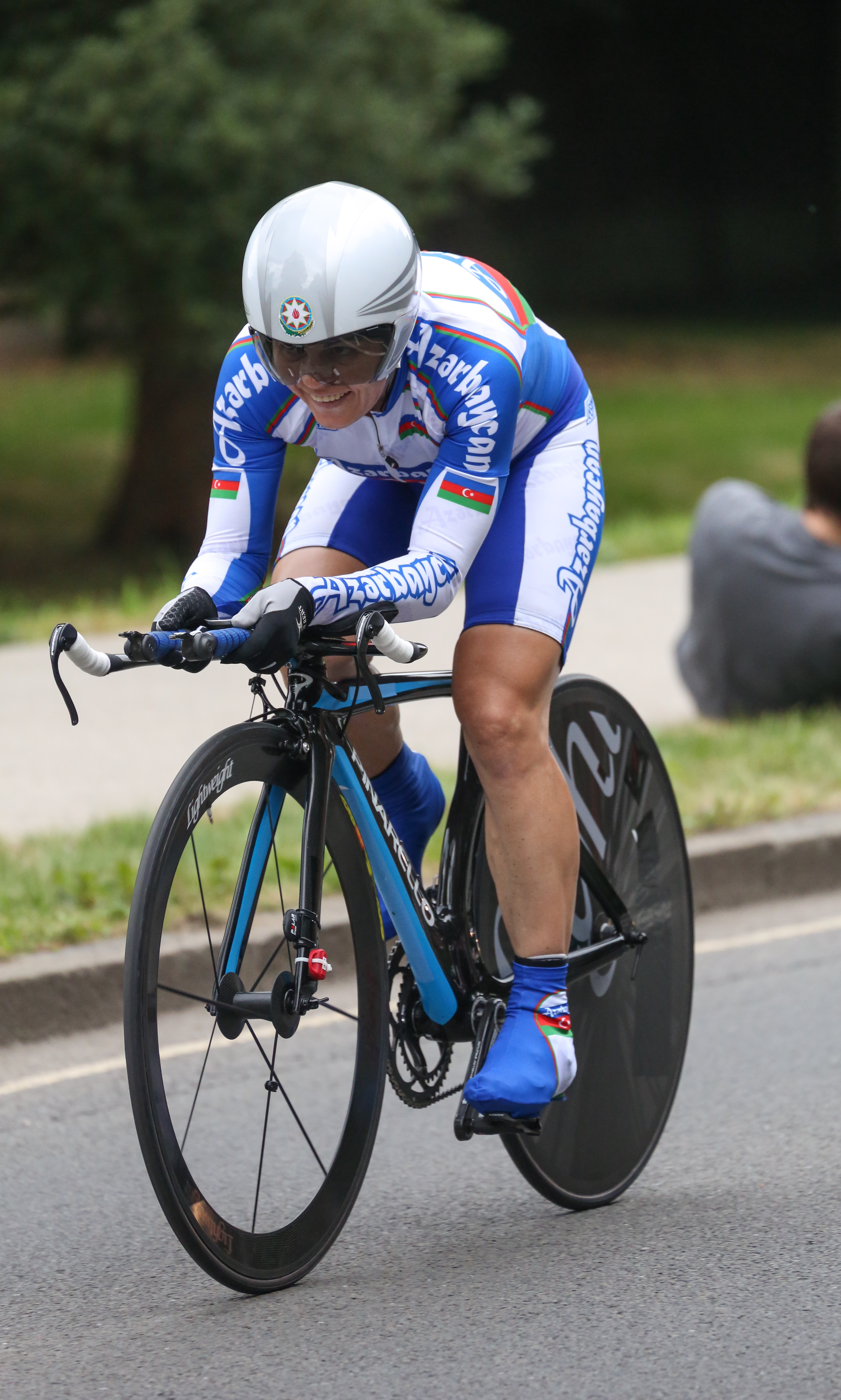

Personal information
- Full name: Elena Tchalykh
- Born: 25 March 1974 (age 52) Rubtsovsk, Altai Krai, USSR

Cycling career
- Sport: Cycling
- Disciplines: Road and Track
- Role: Rider

Professional team
- 2012: Dolmans-Boels Cycling Team
Medal record
Representing Russia
Women's track cycling
World Championships
Bronze medal – third place	2000 Manchester	Pursuit
Bronze medal – third place	2001 Antwerp	Pursuit
Bronze medal – third place	2004 Melbourne	Pursuit
European Track Championships
Gold medal – first place	2008 Pruszków	omnium

Elena Tchalykh (born 25 March 1974) is a Russian professional racing cyclist who competed from 2011 on for Azerbaijan. She competed at the 2012 Summer Olympics in the Women's road race and in the Women's time trial.

== Career highlights ==
1990
1st Pursuit, Track World Championships (Junior)
3rd Points race, Track World Championships (Junior)

1992
2nd Pursuit, Track World Championships (Junior)

2000
3rd Pursuit, Track World Championships

2001
1st (Russia) Russian National Road Race Championships
3rd Pursuit, Track World Championships

2003
2nd Omnium, European Track Championships

2004
3rd Pursuit, Track World Championships
3rd Pursuit, Round 2, 2004–2005 Track World Cup, Los Angeles

2008
2nd Team Pursuit, Round 3, 2007–2008 Track World Cup, Los Angeles
3rd Scratch, Round 3, 2007–2008 Track World Cup, Los Angeles
1st (Europe) omnium, 2008 European Track Championships
1st (Russia) Russian National Time Trial Championships

2009
3rd Team Pursuit, Round 4, 2008–2009 Track World Cup, Beijing
