= 2011–12 UCI Track Cycling World Cup – Round 4 – Women's team pursuit =

Round 4 – Women's team pursuit
2011–12 UCI Track Cycling World Cup, race 4/4

Race details
- Dates: 16–17 February 2012
- Stages: 1
- Distance: 3 km (1.864 mi)
- Winning time: 3:18.148

Medalists
	Gold	United Kingdom; Laura Trott; Danielle King; Joanna Rowsell
	Silver	Canada; Tara Whitten; Gillian Carleton; Jasmin Glaesser
	Bronze	Australia; Annette Edmondson; Amy Cure; Josephine Tomic

The fourth round of the women's team pursuit of the 2011–12 UCI Track Cycling World Cup took place in London, United Kingdom from 16 to 17 February 2012 and was part of the London Prepares series. 15 teams participated in the contest.

== Competition format ==
The women's team pursuit race consists of a 3 km race between two teams of three cyclists, starting on opposite sides of the track. If one team catches the other, the race is over.

The tournament consisted of an initial qualifying round. The top two teams in the qualifying round advanced to the gold medal match and the third and fourth teams advanced to the bronze medal race.

== Schedule ==
Thursday 16 February
Qualifying
Friday 17 February
19:27-19:42 Finals
19:50-19:58 Victory Ceremony

Schedule from Tissottiming.com

== Results ==
=== Qualifying ===
Rank	Country	Cyclists	Result	Notes
1	Canada	Tara Whitten; Gillian Carleton; Jasmin Glaesser	3:20.785	Q
2	United Kingdom	Laura Trott; Wendy Houvenaghel; Joanna Rowsell	3:21.370	Q
3	Australia	Annette Edmondson; Melissa Hoskins; Josephine Tomic	3:21.426	q
4	Netherlands	Ellen van Dijk; Vera Koedooder; Kirsten Wild	3:22.776	q
5	United States	Sarah Hammer; Jennie Reed; Lauren Tamayo	3:23.208	
6	New Zealand	Lauren Ellis; Jaime Nielsen; Alison Shanks	3:25.468	
7	Lithuania	Aušrinė Trebaitė; Vaida Pikauskaitė; Vilija Sereikaitė	3:28.156	
8	Germany	Lisa Brennauer; Charlotte Becker; Madeleine Sandig	3:28.387	
9	Ukraine	Svitlana Halyuk; Lyubov Shulika; Lesya Kalytovska	3:28.633	
10	China	Jiang Fan; Jiang Wenwen; Liang Jing	3:29.136	
11	Belgium	Jolien D'Hoore; Kelly Druyts; Els Belmans	3:29.188	
12	RusVelo	Evgenia Romanyuta; Venera Absalyamova; Irina Molicheva	3:30.190	
13	Poland	Katarzyna Pawłowska; Eugenia Bujak; Małgorzata Wojtyra	3:30.975	
14	Japan	Hiroko Ishii; Maki Tabata; Kayono Maeda	4:13.408	
	Belarus	Tatyana Sharakova; Aksana Papko; Alena Dylko	DSQ	

Results from Tissottiming.com.

=== Finals ===
==== Final bronze medal race ====
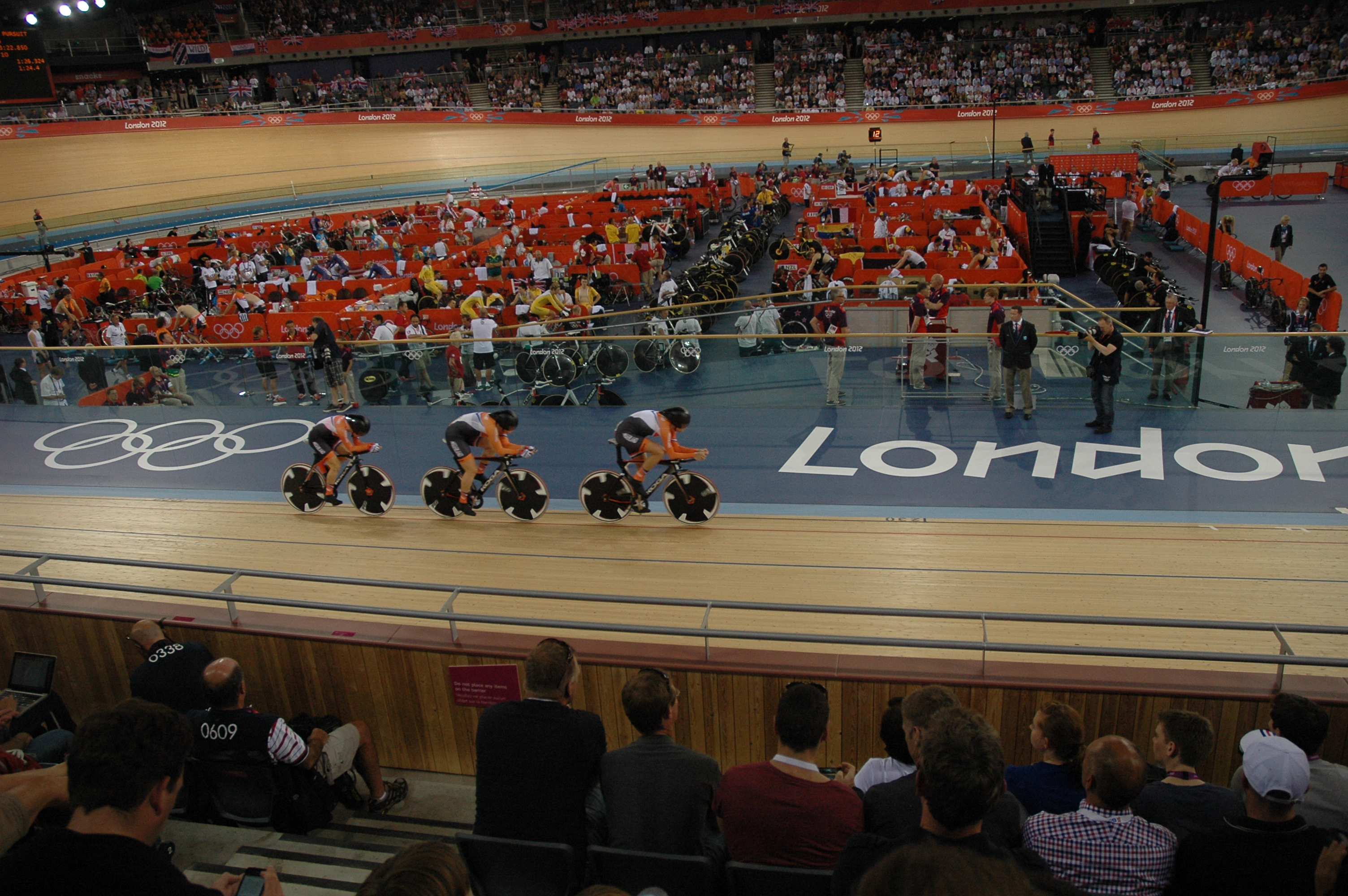
The Dutch team riding at the London Velodrome (during the 2012 Summer Olympics)

Rank	Country	Cyclists	Result	Notes
3rd place, bronze medalist(s)	Australia	Annette Edmondson; Amy Cure; Josephine Tomic	3:19.164	
4	Netherlands	Ellen van Dijk; Vera Koedooder; Kirsten Wild	3:21.992	

==== Final gold medal race ====
Rank	Country	Cyclists	Result	Notes
1st place, gold medalist(s)	United Kingdom	Laura Trott; Danielle King; Joanna Rowsell	3:18.148	WR
2nd place, silver medalist(s)	Canada	Tara Whitten; Gillian Carleton; Jasmin Glaesser	3:18.982	

Results from Tissottiming.com.
