= 2012 UCI Track Cycling World Championships – Women's team pursuit =

Rainbow jersey

The Women's team pursuit at the 2012 UCI Track Cycling World Championships was held on April 5. 14 nations of 3 cyclists each participated in the contest. After the qualifying, the fastest 2 teams raced for gold, and 3rd and 4th teams raced for bronze.

== Medalists ==
Gold	Great Britain; Danielle King; Laura Trott; Joanna Rowsell
Silver	Australia; Annette Edmondson; Melissa Hoskins; Josephine Tomic
Bronze	Canada; Tara Whitten; Jasmin Glaesser; Gillian Carleton

== Results ==
=== Qualifying ===
The Qualifying was held at .

Rank	Name	Nation	Time	Notes
1	Danielle King; Laura Trott; Joanna Rowsell	Great Britain	3:16.850	WR, Q
2	Annette Edmondson; Melissa Hoskins; Josephine Tomic	Australia	3:17.053	Q *
3	Tara Whitten; Jasmin Glaesser; Gillian Carleton	Canada	3:19.494	Q
4	Lauren Ellis; Jaime Nielsen; Alison Shanks	New Zealand	3:20.598	Q
5	Sarah Hammer; Dotsie Bausch; Lauren Tamayo	United States	3:21.765	
6	Alena Dylko; Aksana Papko; Tatsiana Sharakova	Belarus	3:22.509	
7	Jiang Fan; Jiang Wenwen; Liang Jing	China	3:23.083	
8	Charlotte Becker; Lisa Brennauer; Madeleine Sandig	Germany	3:24.145	
9	Svitlana Halyuk; Yelyzaveta Bochkaryova; Lesya Kalytovska	Ukraine	3:24.227	
10	Evgenia Romanyuta; Venera Absalyamova; Viktoriya Kondel	Russia	3:24.644	
11	Vilija Sereikaitė; Aušrinė Trebaitė; Vaida Pikauskaitė	Lithuania	3:25.656	
12	Kanako Kase; Maki Tabata; Minami Uwano	Japan	3:31.165	
13	Meng Zhao Juan; Wong Wan Yiu; Diao Xiao Juan	Hong Kong	3:37.952	
	Katarzyna Pawłowska; Małgorzata Wojtyra; Eugenia Bujak	Poland		DSQ

- The time set by the Australian team in qualifying was itself a new world record, but was immediately overtaken by the Great Britain team.

=== Finals ===
The finals were held at 19:15.

==== Small Final ====
Rank	Name	Nation	Time	Notes
3rd place, bronze medalist(s)	Tara Whitten; Jasmin Glaesser; Gillian Carleton	Canada	3:19.529	
4	Lauren Ellis; Jaime Nielsen; Alison Shanks	New Zealand	3:19.847	

==== Final ====
Rank	Name	Nation	Time	Notes
1st place, gold medalist(s)	Danielle King; Laura Trott; Joanna Rowsell	Great Britain	3:15.720	WR
2nd place, silver medalist(s)	Annette Edmondson; Melissa Hoskins; Josephine Tomic	Australia	3:16.943	
