= 2011 UCI Track Cycling World Championships – Women's team pursuit =

Rainbow jersey

The Women's team pursuit at the 2011 UCI Track Cycling World Championships was held on March 24. 16 nations of 3 cyclists each participated in the contest. After the qualifying, the fastest 2 teams raced for gold, and 3rd and 4th teams raced for bronze.

== Results ==
=== Qualifying ===
The Qualifying was held at 15:25.

Rank	Name	Nation	Time	Notes
1	Laura Trott; Wendy Houvenaghel; Dani King	Great Britain	3:23.642	Q
2	Sarah Hammer; Dotsie Bausch; Jennie Reed	United States	3:23.965	Q
3	Kaytee Boyd; Jaime Nielsen; Alison Shanks	New Zealand	3:24.701	q
4	Amy Cure; Katherine Bates; Josephine Tomic	Australia	3:25.253	q
5	Kirsten Wild; Vera Koedooder; Ellen van Dijk	Netherlands	3:26.092	
6	Tara Whitten; Laura Brown; Clara Hughes	Canada	3:27.255	
7	Lisa Brennauer; Charlotte Becker; Madeleine Sandig	Germany	3:27.623	
8	Svitlana Halyuk; Lesya Kalytovska; Hanna Solovey	Ukraine	3:27.756	
9	Jiang Fan; Jiang Wenwen; Liang Jing	China	3:30.441	
10	Jolien D'Hoore; Els Belmans; Jessie Daams	Belgium	3:30.519	
11	Evgenya Romanyuta; Venera Absalyamova; Anastasia Chulkova	Russia	3:30.650	
12	Tatsiana Sharakova; Alena Dylko; Aksana Papko	Belarus	3:31.229	
13	Vilija Sereikaitė; Vaida Pikauskaitė; Aušrinė Trebaitė	Lithuania	3:31.851	
14	Małgorzata Wojtyra; Edyta Jasińska; Katarzyna Pawłowska	Poland	3:33.311	
15	Monia Baccaille; Annalisa Cucinotta; Tatiana Guderzo	Italy	3:40.434	
16	Diao Xiao Juan; Meng Zhao Juan; Jamie Wong	Hong Kong	3:49.438	

=== Finals ===
The finals were held at 20:15.

Rank	Name	Nation	Time
Gold Medal Race
1st place, gold medalist(s)	Laura Trott; Wendy Houvenaghel; Dani King	Great Britain	3:23.419
2nd place, silver medalist(s)	Sarah Hammer; Dotsie Bausch; Jennie Reed	United States	3:25.308
Bronze Medal Race
3rd place, bronze medalist(s)	Kaytee Boyd; Jaime Nielsen; Alison Shanks	New Zealand	3:24.065
4	Amy Cure; Katherine Bates; Josephine Tomic	Australia	3:24.422
