= World record progression track cycling – Women's team pursuit =

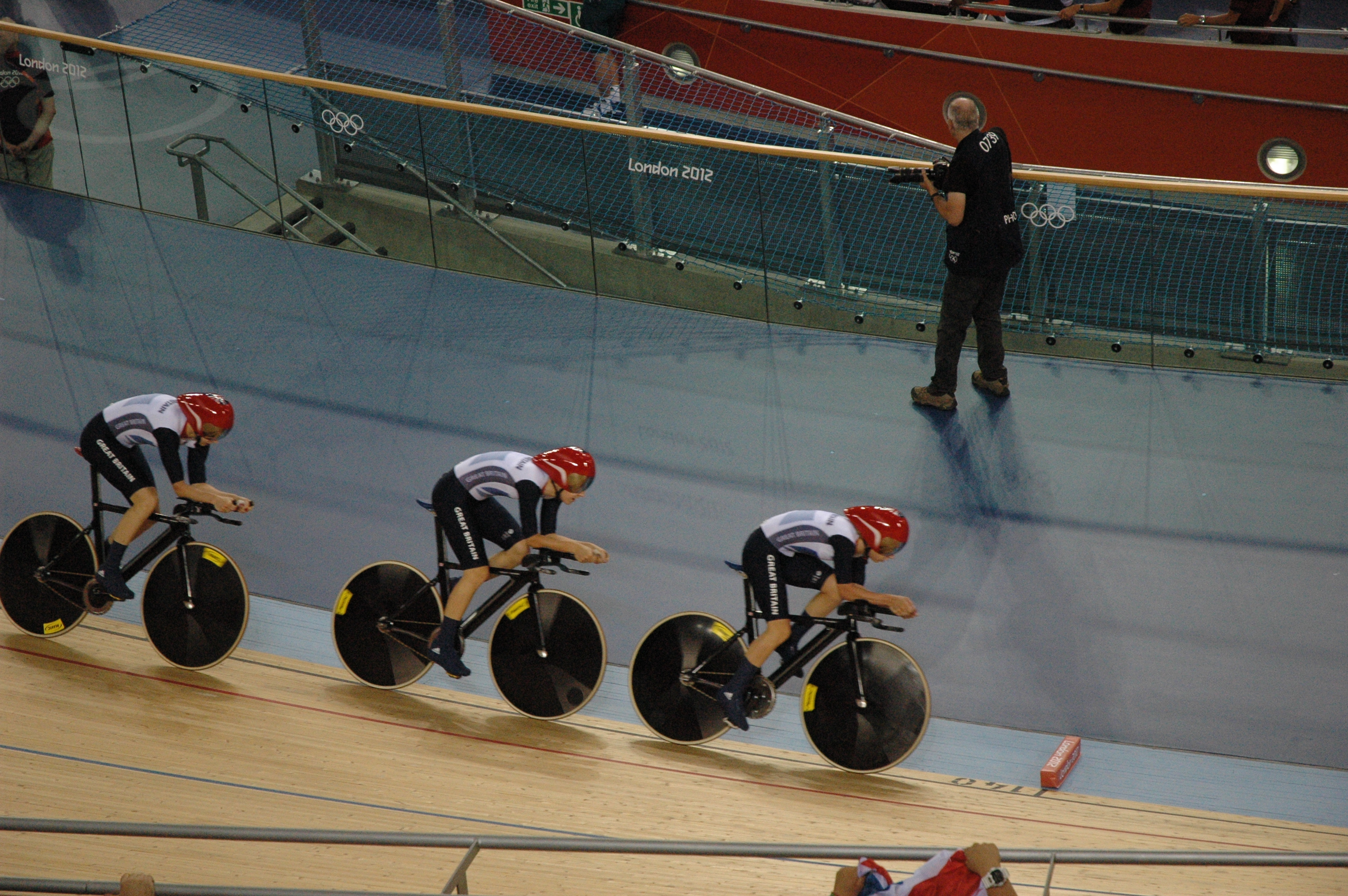
The British team riding the last 3000 m world record at the 2012 Summer Olympics

This is an overview of the progression of the World track cycling record of the women's team pursuit as recognised by the Union Cycliste Internationale (UCI).

The women's 3000m team pursuit discipline for 3 riders was introduced by the UCI at the 2007–08 track cycling season. After the 2012–13 track cycling season the UCI changed the discipline into a 4000 m team pursuit with 4 riders.

Joanna Rowsell Shand, has formed part of ten separate record breaking lineups across both distances, the most by any rider.

== Progression ==
=== 3000 m (2007–2013) ===
Time	Cyclist	Location	Track	Date	Meet
3:34.783	United States; Sarah Hammer; Dotsie Bausch; Jennie Reed	Los Angeles (USA)	Indoor track	21 October 2007	
3:22.415	Great Britain; Wendy Houvenaghel; Rebecca Romero; Joanna Rowsell	Manchester (GBR)	Indoor track	28 March 2008	
3:21.875	Great Britain; Elizabeth Armitstead; Wendy Houvenaghel; Joanna Rowsell	Manchester (GBR)	Indoor track	1 November 2009	
3:21.552	New Zealand; Rushlee Buchanan; Lauren Ellis; Alison Shanks	Copenhagen (DEN)	Indoor track	25 March 2010	
3:19.569	United States; Sarah Hammer; Dotsie Bausch; Lauren Tamayo	Aguascalientes (MEX)	Indoor track	12 May 2010	Pan American Championships
3:18.148	Great Britain; Laura Trott; Danielle King; Joanna Rowsell	London (GBR)	Indoor track	17 February 2012	World Cup
3:15.720	Great Britain; Danielle King; Laura Trott; Joanna Rowsell	Melbourne (AUS)	Indoor track	5 April 2012	World Championships
3:14.051	Great Britain; Danielle King; Laura Trott; Joanna Rowsell	London (GBR)	Indoor track	4 August 2012	Summer Olympics

=== 4000 m (from 2013) ===
Time	Riders	Event	Location	Date	Ref
4:43.144	Italy; Arianna Fidanza, Francesca Pattaro, Michela Maltese, Maria Vittoria Sperotto	Qualifying round European Junior Championships	Anadia (Portugal)	10 July 2013	
4:40.109	Italy; Arianna Fidanza, Francesca Pattaro, Michela Maltese, Maria Vittoria Sperotto	Final; European Junior Championships	Anadia (Portugal)	10 July 2013	
4:38.708	Great Britain; Amy Hill, Hayley Jones, Emily Kay, Emily Nelson	Qualifying round World Junior Championships	Glasgow (United Kingdom)	8 August 2013	
4:36.147	Great Britain; Amy Hill, Hayley Jones, Emily Kay, Emily Nelson	Final; World Junior Championships	Glasgow (United Kingdom)	8 August 2013	
4:32.721	Great Britain; Laura Trott, Joanna Rowsell, Danielle King, Elinor Barker	British Championships	Manchester (United Kingdom)	29 September 2013	
4:28.738	Great Britain; Laura Trott, Katie Archibald, Joanna Rowsell, Elinor Barker	Qualifying round European Championships	Apeldoorn (Netherlands)	18 October 2013	
4:26.556	Great Britain; Laura Trott, Katie Archibald, Danielle King, Elinor Barker	Final; European Championships	Apeldoorn (Netherlands)	18 October 2013	
4:23.910	Great Britain; Laura Trott, Joanna Rowsell, Danielle King, Elinor Barker	Qualifying round World Cup	Manchester (United Kingdom)	1 November 2013	
4:19.604	Great Britain; Laura Trott, Joanna Rowsell, Danielle King, Elinor Barker	Final; World Cup	Manchester (United Kingdom)	1 November 2013	
4:19.115	Great Britain; Katie Archibald, Joanna Rowsell, Danielle King, Elinor Barker	Qualifying round World Cup	Aguascalientes (Mexico)	5 December 2013	
4:16.552	Great Britain; Katie Archibald, Joanna Rowsell, Danielle King, Elinor Barker	Final; World Cup	Aguascalientes (Mexico)	5 December 2013	
4:13.683	Australia; Annette Edmondson, Melissa Hoskins, Amy Cure, Ashlee Ankudinoff	Final; World Championships	Saint-Quentin-en-Yvelines (France)	19 February 2015	
4:13.260	Great Britain; Katie Archibald, Laura Trott, Elinor Barker, Joanna Rowsell Shand	Qualifying round Summer Olympics	Rio de Janeiro (Brazil)	11 August 2016	
4:12.282	United States; Sarah Hammer, Kelly Catlin, Chloé Dygert, Jennifer Valente	First round Summer Olympics	Rio de Janeiro (Brazil)	13 August 2016	
4:12.152	Great Britain; Katie Archibald, Laura Trott, Elinor Barker, Joanna Rowsell Shand	First round Summer Olympics	Rio de Janeiro (Brazil)	13 August 2016	
4:10.236	Great Britain; Katie Archibald, Laura Trott, Elinor Barker, Joanna Rowsell Shand	Final; Summer Olympics	Rio de Janeiro (Brazil)	13 August 2016	
4:07.307	Germany; Franziska Brauße, Lisa Brennauer, Lisa Klein, Mieke Kröger	Qualifying round Summer Olympics	Izu (Japan)	2 August 2021	
4:06.748	Great Britain; Katie Archibald, Laura Kenny, Neah Evans, Josie Knight	First round Summer Olympics	Izu (Japan)	3 August 2021	
4:06.159	Germany; Franziska Brauße, Lisa Brennauer, Lisa Klein, Mieke Kröger	First round Summer Olympics	Izu (Japan)	3 August 2021	
4:04.242	Germany; Franziska Brauße, Lisa Brennauer, Lisa Klein, Mieke Kröger	Final; Summer Olympics	Izu (Japan)	3 August 2021	
4:03.634	Great Britain; Katie Archibald, Josie Knight, Anna Morris, Millie Couzens	First round European Championships	Konya (Turkey)	2 February 2026	
4:02.808	Great Britain; Katie Archibald, Josie Knight, Anna Morris, Millie Couzens	Final; European Championships	Konya (Turkey)	2 February 2026	

View source data.
