= 2010–11 UCI Track Cycling World Cup Classics – Round 1 – Women's team pursuit =

Round 1 – Women's team pursuit
2010–2011 UCI Track Cycling World Cup Classics, race 1/4

Race details
- Dates: 2 December 2010
- Stages: 1
- Distance: 3 km (1.864 mi)
- Winning time: 3:22.171

Medalists
	Gold	Australia; Katherine Bates; Sarah Kent; Josephine Tomic
	Silver	Germany; Lisa Brennauer; Charlotte Becker; Madeleine Sandig
	Bronze	New Zealand; Lauren Ellis; Jaime Nielsen; Kaytee Boyd

The first round of the women's team pursuit of the 2010–11 UCI Track Cycling World Cup Classics took place in Melbourne, Australia on 2 December 2010. 17 teams participated in the contest.

== Competition format ==
The women's team pursuit race consists of a 3 km race between two teams of three cyclists, starting on opposite sides of the track. If one team catches the other, the race is over.

The tournament consisted of an initial qualifying round. The top two teams in the qualifying round advanced to the gold medal match and the third and fourth teams advanced to the bronze medal race.

== Schedule ==
Thursday 2 December
14:50-16:30 Qualifying
19:51-20:06 Finals
20:16-20:24 Victory Ceremony

Schedule from Tissottiming.com

== Results ==
=== Qualifying ===
Rank	Country	Cyclists	Result	Notes
1	Australia	Katherine Bates; Sarah Kent; Josephine Tomic	3:24.244	Q
2	Germany	Lisa Brennauer; Charlotte Becker; Madeleine Sandig	3:24.813	Q
3	Canada	Tara Whitten; Laura Brown; Stephanie Roorda	3:25.138	q
4	New Zealand	Lauren Ellis; Jaime Nielsen; Kaytee Boyd	3:25.299	q
5	Netherlands	Ellen van Dijk; Vera Koedooder; Amy Pieters	3:27.382	
6	Ukraine	Lesya Kalytovska; Svitlana Halyuk; Hanna Solovey	3:28.564	
7	United States	Kimberly Geist; Dotsie Bausch; Lauren Tamayo	3:29.355	
8	Lithuania	Aušrinė Trebaitė; Vaida Pikauskaitė; Vilija Sereikaitė	3:29.385	
9	Russia	Anastasia Chulkova; Viktoriya Kondel; Venera Absalyamova	3:29.403	
10	Poland	Katarzyna Pawłowska; Edyta Jasińska; Małgorzata Wojtyra	3:30.303	
11	Belarus	Tatyana Sharakova; Aksana Papko; Alena Dylko	3:31.959	
12	Belgium	Jolien D'Hoore; Else Belmans; Maaike Polspoel	3:32.447	
13	France	Aude Biannic; Sophie Creux; Fiona Dutriaux	3:32.602	
14	Spain	Leire Olaberria Dorronsoro; Débora Gálves Lopez; Gloria Rodríguez Sánchez	3:32.615	
15	Italy	Marta Bastianelli; Marta Tagliaferro; Alessandra Borchi	3:36.767	
16	Treads.com/DFT Cycling Team	Megan Hottman; Emy Huntsman; Jennifer Triplett	3:38.071	
17	Thailand	Panawaraporn Boonsawat; Nontasin Chanpeng; Monrudee Chapookam	3:54.045	

Results from Tissottiming.com.

=== Finals ===
==== Final bronze medal race ====
Rank	Team	Cyclists	Result	Notes
3rd place, bronze medalist(s)	New Zealand	Lauren Ellis; Jaime Nielsen; Kaytee Boyd	3:23.477	
4	Canada	Tara Whitten; Laura Brown; Stephanie Roorda	3:25.402	

==== Final gold medal race ====
Rank	Team	Cyclists	Result	Notes
1st place, gold medalist(s)	Australia	Katherine Bates; Sarah Kent; Josephine Tomic	3:22.171	
2nd place, silver medalist(s)	Germany	Lisa Brennauer; Charlotte Becker; Madeleine Sandig	3:24.813	

Results from Tissottiming.com.
