= 2013 UCI Track Cycling World Championships – Women's team pursuit =

Cycling race

Rainbow jersey

The Women's team pursuit at the 2013 UCI Track Cycling World Championships was held on February 21. 10 nations of 3 cyclists each participated in the contest. After the qualifying, the fastest 2 teams raced for gold, and 3rd and 4th teams raced for bronze.

== Medalists ==
Gold	Great Britain; Laura Trott; Dani King; Elinor Barker
Silver	Australia; Annette Edmondson; Amy Cure; Melissa Hoskins
Bronze	Canada; Gillian Carleton; Jasmin Glaesser; Laura Brown

== Results ==
=== Qualifying ===
The qualifying was held at 14:20.

Rank	Name	Nation	Time	Notes
1	Laura Trott; Dani King; Elinor Barker	Great Britain	3:18.704	Q
2	Annette Edmondson; Ashlee Ankudinoff; Melissa Hoskins	Australia	3:20.696	Q
3	Gillian Carleton; Jasmin Glaesser; Laura Brown	Canada	3:22.784	Q
4	Katarzyna Pawłowska; Małgorzata Wojtyra; Eugenia Bujak	Poland	3:28.096	Q
5	Oxana Kozonchuk; Maria Mishina; Evgenia Romanyuta	Russia	3:28.433	
6	Lisa Brennauer; Stephanie Pohl; Mieke Kröger	Germany	3:29.536	
7	Volha Masiukovich; Alena Dylko; Aksana Papko	Belarus	3:29.905	
8	Simona Frapporti; Beatrice Bartelloni; Giulia Donato	Italy	3:30.042	
9	Els Belmans; Lotte Kopecky; Sarah Inghelbrecht	Belgium	3:33.163	
10	Ivanna Borovychenko; Oksana Lyesnik; Anna Nahirna	Ukraine	3:40.808	

=== Finals ===
The finals were held at 20:20.

==== Small Final ====
Rank	Name	Nation	Time	Notes
3rd place, bronze medalist(s)	Gillian Carleton; Jasmin Glaesser; Laura Brown	Canada	3:20.704	
4	Katarzyna Pawłowska; Małgorzata Wojtyra; Edyta Jasińska	Poland	3:29.024	

==== Final ====
Rank	Name	Nation	Time	Notes
1st place, gold medalist(s)	Laura Trott; Dani King; Elinor Barker	Great Britain	3:18.140	
2nd place, silver medalist(s)	Annette Edmondson; Amy Cure; Melissa Hoskins	Australia	3:19.913	
