= 2011 European Track Championships – Women's team pursuit =

UEC European Champion jersey

The Women's team pursuit was held on 21 October 2011 with 12 teams participating.

== Medalists ==
Gold	Great Britain; Danielle King; Joanna Rowsell; Laura Trott
Silver	Germany; Charlotte Becker; Lisa Brennauer; Madeleine Sandig
Bronze	Belarus; Alena Dylko; Aksana Papko; Tatsiana Sharakova

== Results ==
=== Qualifying ===
Fastest 2 teams race for gold and 3rd and 4th teams race for bronze. It was held at 13:00.

Rank	Name	Nation	Time	Notes
1	Danielle King; Joanna Rowsell; Laura Trott	Great Britain	3:22.414	Q
2	Charlotte Becker; Lisa Brennauer; Madeleine Sandig	Germany	3:26.778	Q
3	Alena Dylko; Aksana Papko; Tatsiana Sharakova	Belarus	3:26.864	q
4	Yelyzaveta Bochkaryova; Svitlana Halyuk; Lesya Kalytovska	Ukraine	3:28.763	q
5	Ellen van Dijk; Vera Koedooder; Kirsten Wild	Netherlands	3:30.495	
6	Jessie Daams; Jolien D'Hoore; Kelly Druyts	Belgium	3:31.988	
7	Ciara Horne; Sinéad Jennings; Caroline Ryan	Ireland	3:32.821	
8	Edyta Jasińska; Katarzyna Pawłowska; Małgorzata Wojtyra	Poland	3:33.030	
9	Vaida Pikauskaitė; Aleksandra Sošenko; Aušrinė Trebaitė	Lithuania	3:33.726	
10	Leire Olaberria; Gloria Rodríguez; Ana Usabiaga	Spain	3:36.474	
11	Aleksandra Goncharova; Lidia Malakhova; Irina Molicheva	Russia	3:36.607	
12	Simona Frapporti; Gloria Presti; Silvia Valsecchi	Italy	3:37.400	

=== Finals ===
The final was held at 20:00.

Rank	Name	Nation	Time
Gold Medal Race
1st place, gold medalist(s)	Danielle King; Joanna Rowsell; Laura Trott	Great Britain	3:22.618
2nd place, silver medalist(s)	Charlotte Becker; Lisa Brennauer; Madeleine Sandig	Germany	3:29.596
Bronze Medal Race
3rd place, bronze medalist(s)	Alena Dylko; Aksana Papko; Tatsiana Sharakova	Belarus	3:26.864
–	Yelyzaveta Bochkaryova; Svitlana Halyuk; Lesya Kalytovska	Ukraine	DNF
