= 2012 UCI Track Cycling World Championships – Women's scratch =

Women's scratch at the 2012 UCI Track Cycling World Championships
- Venue: Hisense Arena, Melbourne
- Date: 6 April 2012
- Competitors: 17 from 17 nations

Medalists
| gold medal | Katarzyna Pawłowska | Poland |
| silver medal | Melissa Hoskins | Australia |
| bronze medal | Kelly Druyts | Belgium |

The Women's scratch at the 2012 UCI Track Cycling World Championships was held on April 6. 17 athletes participated in the contest. The competition consisted of 40 laps, totaling 10 km.

== Results ==
The race was held at 19:25.

| Rank | Name | Nation | Laps down |
|---|---|---|---|
| 1st place, gold medalist(s) | Katarzyna Pawłowska | Poland | |
| 2nd place, silver medalist(s) | Melissa Hoskins | Australia | |
| 3rd place, bronze medalist(s) | Kelly Druyts | Belgium | |
| 4 | Danielle King | Great Britain | |
| 5 | Cari Higgins | United States | |
| 6 | Sofía Arreola | Mexico | |
| 7 | Helena Casas | Spain | |
| 8 | Jarmila Machačová | Czech Republic | |
| 9 | Maki Tabata | Japan | |
| 10 | Elena Cecchini | Italy | |
| 11 | Diao Xiao Juan | Hong Kong | |
| 12 | Shannon McCurley | Ireland | |
| 13 | Charlotte Becker | Germany | |
| 14 | Gemma Dudley | New Zealand | |
| 15 | Vera Koedooder | Netherlands | |
| 16 | Lesya Kalytovska | Ukraine | |
| – | Yumari González | Cuba | REL |
