= 2011 UCI Track Cycling World Championships – Women's individual pursuit =

Rainbow jersey

The Women's individual pursuit at the 2011 UCI Track Cycling World Championships was held on March 25. 18 athletes participated in the contest. After the qualification, the fastest 2 riders advanced to the Final and the 3rd and 4th fastest riders raced for the bronze medal.

== Results ==
=== Qualifying ===
The Qualifying was held at 14:00.

Rank	Name	Nation	Time	Notes
1	Sarah Hammer	United States	3:33.522	Q
2	Alison Shanks	New Zealand	3:33.789	Q
3	Vilija Sereikaitė	Lithuania	3:38.073	q
4	Jaime Nielsen	New Zealand	3:38.921	q
5	Ellen van Dijk	Netherlands	3:40.751	
6	Marlies Mejías	Cuba	3:42.158	
7	Pascale Schnider	Switzerland	3:42.764	
8	Lauren Ellis	New Zealand	3:44.165	
9	Caroline Ryan	Ireland	3:44.264	
10	Aksana Papko	Belarus	3:45.348	
11	Verena Joos	Germany	3:45.636	
12	Cari Higgins	United States	3:49.616	
13	Alena Dylko	Belarus	3:51.314	
14	Eglė Zablockytė	Lithuania	3:55.130	
15	Chanpeng Nontasin	Thailand	3:56.653	
16	Hsiao Mei-yu	Chinese Taipei	3:59.477	
–	Sarah Kent	Australia	DNS	
–	Josephine Tomic	Australia	DNS	

=== Finals ===
The finals were held at 20:55.

Rank	Name	Nation	Time
Gold Medal Race
1st place, gold medalist(s)	Sarah Hammer	United States	3.32.933
2nd place, silver medalist(s)	Alison Shanks	New Zealand	3:33.229
Bronze Medal Race
3rd place, bronze medalist(s)	Vilija Sereikaitė	Lithuania	3.37.643
4	Jaime Nielsen	New Zealand	3:40.138
