= 2011 UCI Track Cycling World Championships – Women's scratch =

Women's scatch race
2011 UCI Track Cycling World Championships
- Rainbow jersey

Race details
- Dates: 26 March 2011
- Stages: 1
- Distance: 10 km (6.214 mi)

Medalists
	Gold	Marianne Vos (Netherlands)
	Silver	Katherine Bates (Australia)
	Bronze	Danielle King (United Kingdom)

The Women's scratch at the 2011 UCI Track Cycling World Championships was held on March 26. Nineteen athletes participated in the contest. The competition consisted of 40 laps, making a total of 10 km.

== Results ==
The race was held at 17:20.

Rank	Name	Nation	Laps down
1st place, gold medalist(s)	Marianne Vos	Netherlands	
2nd place, silver medalist(s)	Katherine Bates	Australia	
3rd place, bronze medalist(s)	Danielle King	United Kingdom	
4	Els Belmans	Belgium	
5	Aksana Papko	Belarus	
6	Małgorzata Wojtyra	Poland	
7	Giorgia Bronzini	Italy	
8	Anastasia Chulkova	Russia	
9	Sofía Arreola Navarro	Mexico	
10	Lucie Záleská	Czech Republic	
11	Elke Gebhardt	Germany	
12	Débora Gálvez	Spain	
13	Diao Xiao Juan	Hong Kong	
14	Fatehah Mustapa	Malaysia	
15	Jennie Reed	United States	
16	Alžbeta Pavlendová	Slovakia	
17	Yoanka González	Cuba	
18	Pascale Jeuland	France	
19	Paola Muñoz	Chile	
