= 2014 UCI Track Cycling World Championships – Women's individual pursuit =

Women's individual pursuit at the 2014 UCI Track Cycling World Championships
- Venue: Velódromo Alcides Nieto Patiño, Cali
- Date: 28 February 2014
- Competitors: 15 from 11 nations
- Winning time: 3:30.318

Medalists
gold medal	Joanna Rowsell	Great Britain
silver medal	Sarah Hammer	United States
bronze medal	Amy Cure	Australia

The Women's individual pursuit at the 2014 UCI Track Cycling World Championships was held on 28 February 2014. 15 cyclists participated in the contest. After all riders have contested qualifying, the fastest two riders advanced to the final and raced for the gold medal, while the riders ranked third and fourth, raced for the bronze medal.

== Medalists ==
Gold	Joanna Rowsell (GBR)
Silver	Sarah Hammer (USA)
Bronze	Amy Cure (AUS)

== Results ==
=== Qualifying ===
The qualifying was started at 13:30.

Rank	Name	Nation	Time	Notes
1	Sarah Hammer	United States	3:29.711	Q
2	Joanna Rowsell	Great Britain	3:30.610	Q
3	Amy Cure	Australia	3:30.895	Q
4	Hanna Solovey	Ukraine	3:33.244	Q
5	María Luisa Calle	Colombia	3:37.576	
6	Caroline Ryan	Ireland	3:37.847	
7	Eugenia Bujak	Poland	3:38.138	
8	Leire Olaberria	Spain	3:40.069	
9	Elinor Barker	Great Britain	3:41.609	
10	Ruth Winder	United States	3:42.908	
11	Els Belmans	Belgium	3:43.330	
12	Beatrice Bartelloni	Italy	3:43.577	
13	Lotte Kopecky	Belgium	3:43.921	
14	Yudelmis Domínguez	Cuba	3:45.293	
15	Maria Giulia Confalonieri	Italy	3:48.166	

=== Finals ===
The finals were started at 19:45.

Rank	Name	Nation	Time
Gold Medal Race
1st place, gold medalist(s)	Joanna Rowsell	Great Britain	3:30.318
2nd place, silver medalist(s)	Sarah Hammer	United States	3:31.535
Bronze Medal Race
3rd place, bronze medalist(s)	Amy Cure	Australia	3:36.174
4	Hanna Solovey	Ukraine	3:37.003
