= 2010 UCI Track Cycling World Championships – Women's points race =

Rainbow jersey

Race video

The Women's Points Race is one of the 9 women's events at the 2010 UCI Track Cycling World Championships, held in Ballerup, Denmark.

24 Cyclists participated in the contest. The Final was held on 28 March.

== Results ==
Rank	Name	Nation	Sprint points	Lap points	Total points
1st place, gold medalist(s)	Tara Whitten	Canada	16	20	36
2nd place, silver medalist(s)	Lauren Ellis	New Zealand	13	20	33
3rd place, bronze medalist(s)	Tatsiana Sharakova	Belarus	13	20	33
4	Elena Tchalykh	Azerbaijan	6	20	26
5	Paola Muñoz	Chile	2	20	22
6	Giorgia Bronzini	Italy	14	0	14
7	Leire Olaberria	Spain	9	0	9
8	Ellen van Dijk	Netherlands	8	0	8
9	Lizzie Armitstead	Great Britain	7	0	7
10	Megan Dunn	Australia	7	0	7
11	Shelley Evans	United States	4	0	4
12	Andrea Wölfer	Switzerland	3	0	3
13	Elena Brezhviva	Russia	3	0	3
14	Jarmila Machačová	Czech Republic	2	0	2
15	Pascale Jeuland	France	2	0	2
16	Dalila Rodríguez Hernandez	Cuba	1	0	1
17	Sofía Arreola Navarro	Mexico	0	0	0
18	Nontasin Chanpeng	Thailand	0	0	0
19	Julie Leth	Denmark	0	0	0
20	Elissavet Chantzi	Greece	0	0	0
21	Madeleine Sandig	Germany	0	0	0
22	Wong Wan Yiu Jamie	Hong Kong	0	0	0
	Jolien D'Hoore	Belgium	0	0	DNF
	Aušrinė Trebaitė	Lithuania	0	0	DNF
