= 2018 The Women's Tour =

2018 UCI Women's World Tour, race 13 of 24
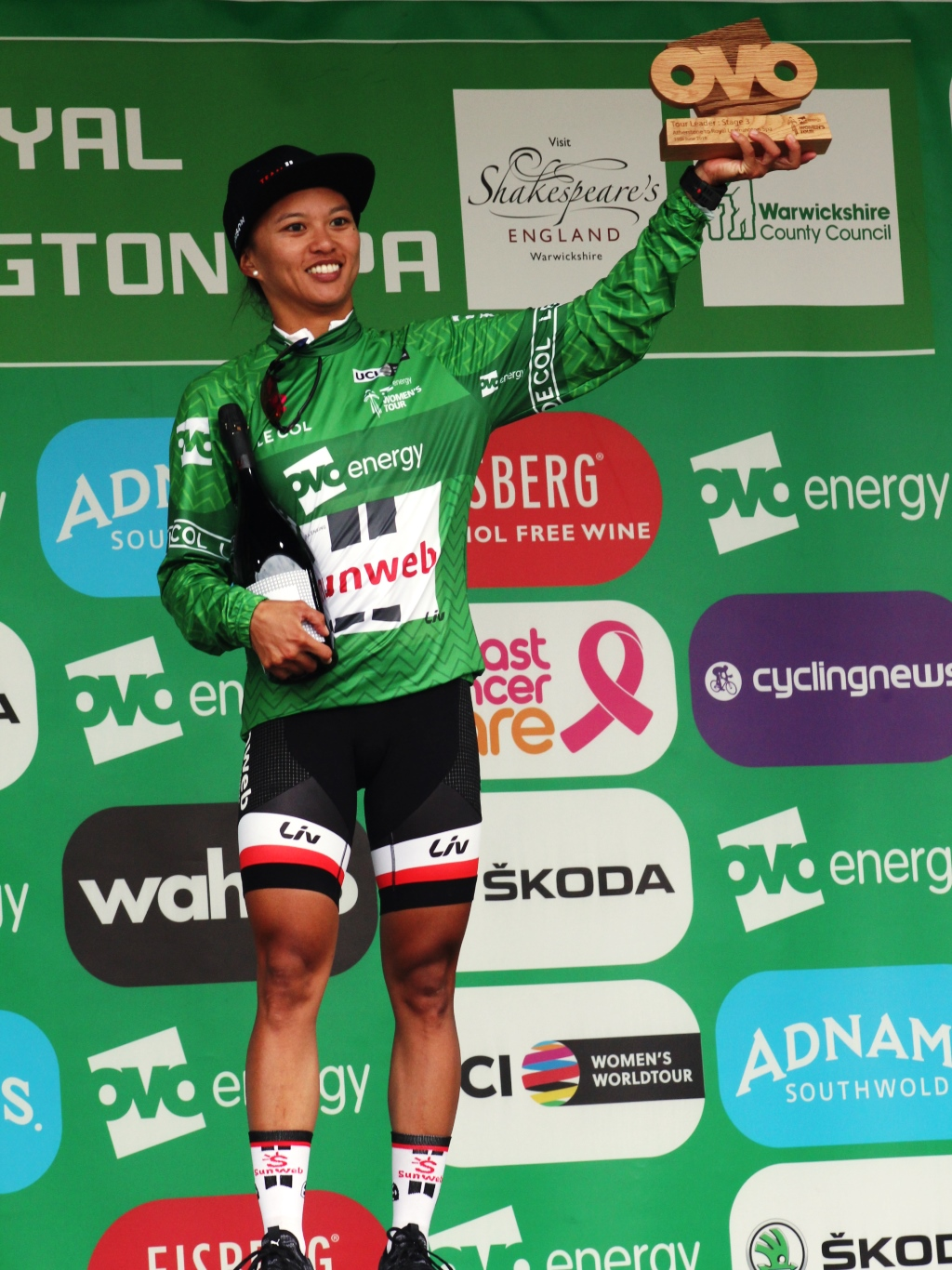
- Coryn Rivera, winner of the 2018 Women's Tour

Race details
- Dates: 13–17 June 2018
- Stages: 5
- Distance: 678.1 km (421.4 mi)
- Winning time: 13h 52' 36"

Results
Jersey awarded to the overall winner	Winner	Coryn Rivera (USA)	(Team Sunweb)
	Second	Marianne Vos (NED)	(WaowDeals Pro Cycling)
	Third	Dani Rowe (GBR)	(WaowDeals Pro Cycling)
Jersey awarded to the points classification winner	Points	Marianne Vos (NED)	(WaowDeals Pro Cycling)
Jersey awarded to the mountains classification winner	Mountains	Elisa Longo Borghini (ITA)	(Wiggle High5)
Jersey awarded to the sprints classification winner	Sprints	Coryn Rivera (USA)	(Team Sunweb)
	Team	WaowDeals Pro Cycling	

The 2018 Ovo Energy Women's Tour was the fifth staging of The Women's Tour, a women's cycling stage race held in the United Kingdom. It ran from 13 to 17 June 2018, as part of the 2018 UCI Women's World Tour.

The race was won by American rider Coryn Rivera of Team Sunweb, after winning stage 2 and holding her lead to the finish. Rivera also won the sprints classification. Second place overall was Dutch rider Marianne Vos of WaowDeals Pro Cycling, with Vos also winning the points classification. Third place overall was Vos' teammate Dani Rowe – the highest placed British rider overall. WaowDeals Pro Cycling also won the teams classification. The mountains classification was won by Italian rider Elisa Longo Borghini of Wiggle High5.

== Route ==
Stage schedule
Stage	Date	Course	Distance	Type	Winner
1	13 June	Framlingham to Southwold	129.7 km (80.6 mi)	Flat stage	Jolien D'Hoore (BEL)
2	14 June	Rushden to Daventry	143.9 km (89.4 mi)	Hilly stage	Coryn Rivera (USA)
3	15 June	Atherstone to Leamington Spa	150.4 km (93.5 mi)	Hilly stage	Sarah Roy (AUS)
4	16 June	Wychavon District to Worcester	131.5 km (81.7 mi)	Hilly stage	Amalie Dideriksen (DEN)
5	17 June	Dolgellau to Colwyn Bay	122.6 km (76.2 mi)	Flat stage	Lotta Lepisto (FIN)

== Classification leadership table ==
Classification leadership by stage
Stage	Winner	General classification	Points classification	Mountains classification	Sprints classification	British rider classification	Combativity	Team classification
1	Jolien D'Hoore	Jolien D'Hoore	Jolien D'Hoore	Christine Majerus	Amy Pieters	Dani Rowe	Susanne Andersen	WaowDeals Pro Cycling
2	Coryn Rivera	Coryn Rivera	Coryn Rivera	Elisa Longo Borghini	Coryn Rivera	Dani Rowe	Maaike Boogaard	WaowDeals Pro Cycling
3	Sarah Roy	Coryn Rivera	Coryn Rivera	Elisa Longo Borghini	Coryn Rivera	Dani Rowe	Ann-Sophie Duyck	WaowDeals Pro Cycling
4	Amalie Dideriksen	Coryn Rivera	Marianne Vos	Elisa Longo Borghini	Coryn Rivera	Dani Rowe	Charlotte Becker	WaowDeals Pro Cycling
5	Lotta Lepisto	Coryn Rivera	Marianne Vos	Elisa Longo Borghini	Coryn Rivera	Dani Rowe	Natalie Grinczer	WaowDeals Pro Cycling
Final		Coryn Rivera	Marianne Vos	Elisa Longo Borghini	Coryn Rivera	Dani Rowe	No overall award	WaowDeals Pro Cycling

== See also ==
- 2018 in women's road cycling
