= 2014 Ronde van Gelderland =

Race details
- Dates: 20 April 2014
- Stages: 1
- Distance: 138 km (86 mi)
- Winning time: 3h 20' 55"

Results
	Winner	Kirsten Wild (NED)	(Team Giant–Shimano)
	Second	Jolien D'Hoore (BEL)	(Lotto–Belisol Ladies)
	Third	Melissa Hoskins (AUS)	(Orica–AIS)

The 2014 Ronde van Gelderland was a one-day women's cycle race held in the Netherlands on 20 April 2014. The race had a UCI rating of 1.2.

== Results ==
	Rider	Team	Time
1	Kirsten Wild (NED)	Team Giant–Shimano	3h 20' 55"
2	Jolien D'Hoore (BEL)	Lotto–Belisol Ladies	s.t.
3	Melissa Hoskins (AUS)	Orica–AIS	s.t.
4	Thalita de Jong (NED)	Rabobank-Liv Woman Cycling Team	s.t.
5	Emma Johansson (SWE)	Orica–AIS	s.t.
6	Annemiek van Vleuten (NED)	Rabobank-Liv Woman Cycling Team	s.t.
7	Elisa Longo Borghini (ITA)	Hitec Products	s.t.
8	Roxane Knetemann (NED)	Rabobank-Liv Woman Cycling Team	s.t.
9	Nina Kessler (NED)	Boels–Dolmans	s.t.
10	Anna van der Breggen (NED)	Rabobank-Liv Woman Cycling Team	s.t.

== See also ==
- 2014 in women's road cycling
