= 2013 UEC European Track Championships – Women's points race =

Women's points race at the 2013 UEC European Track Championships
- UEC European Champion jersey
- Venue: Omnisport Apeldoorn, Apeldoorn
- Date: 18 October
- Competitors: 20 from 14 nations

Medalists
gold medal	Kirsten Wild	Netherlands
silver medal	Dani King	Great Britain
bronze medal	Leire Olaberria	Spain

The Women's points race was held on 18 October 2013. 20 riders participated over a distance of 25 km (100 laps), with sprints every 10 laps awarding 5, 3, 2 or 1 point to the first four; 20 points are also awarded/withdrawn for each lap gained/lost respectively.

== Results ==
Rank	Name	Nation	Sprint points	Lap points	Finish order	Total points
1st place, gold medalist(s)	Kirsten Wild	Netherlands	15	0	2	15
2nd place, silver medalist(s)	Dani King	Great Britain	14	0	3	14
3rd place, bronze medalist(s)	Leire Olaberria	Spain	13	0	1	13
4	Julie Leth	Denmark	11	0	6	11
5	Stephanie Pohl	Germany	10	0	8	10
6	Jarmila Machačová	Czech Republic	9	0	7	9
7	Elena Cecchini	Italy	7	0	9	7
8	Eugenia Bujak	Poland	6	0	10	6
9	Maria Giulia Confalonieri	Italy	5	0	12	5
10	Ina Savenka	Belarus	4	0	4	4
11	Laurie Berthon	France	3	0	5	3
12	Małgorzata Wojtyra	Poland	3	0	16	3
13	Palina Pivavarava	Belarus	3	0	17	3
14	Alžbeta Pavlendová	Slovakia	1	0	13	1
15	Katie Archibald	Great Britain	0	0	11	0
16	Ana Usabiaga	Spain	0	0	14	0
17	Evelyn Arys	Belgium	0	0	15	0
—	Irina Molicheva	Russia	5	0	—	DNF
—	Roxane Knetemann	Netherlands	1	0	—	DNF
—	Valeriya Kononenko	Ukraine	0	0	—	DSQ
