= Cycling at the 2012 Summer Olympics – Women's team pursuit =

Women's cycling team pursuit at the Games of the XXX Olympiad
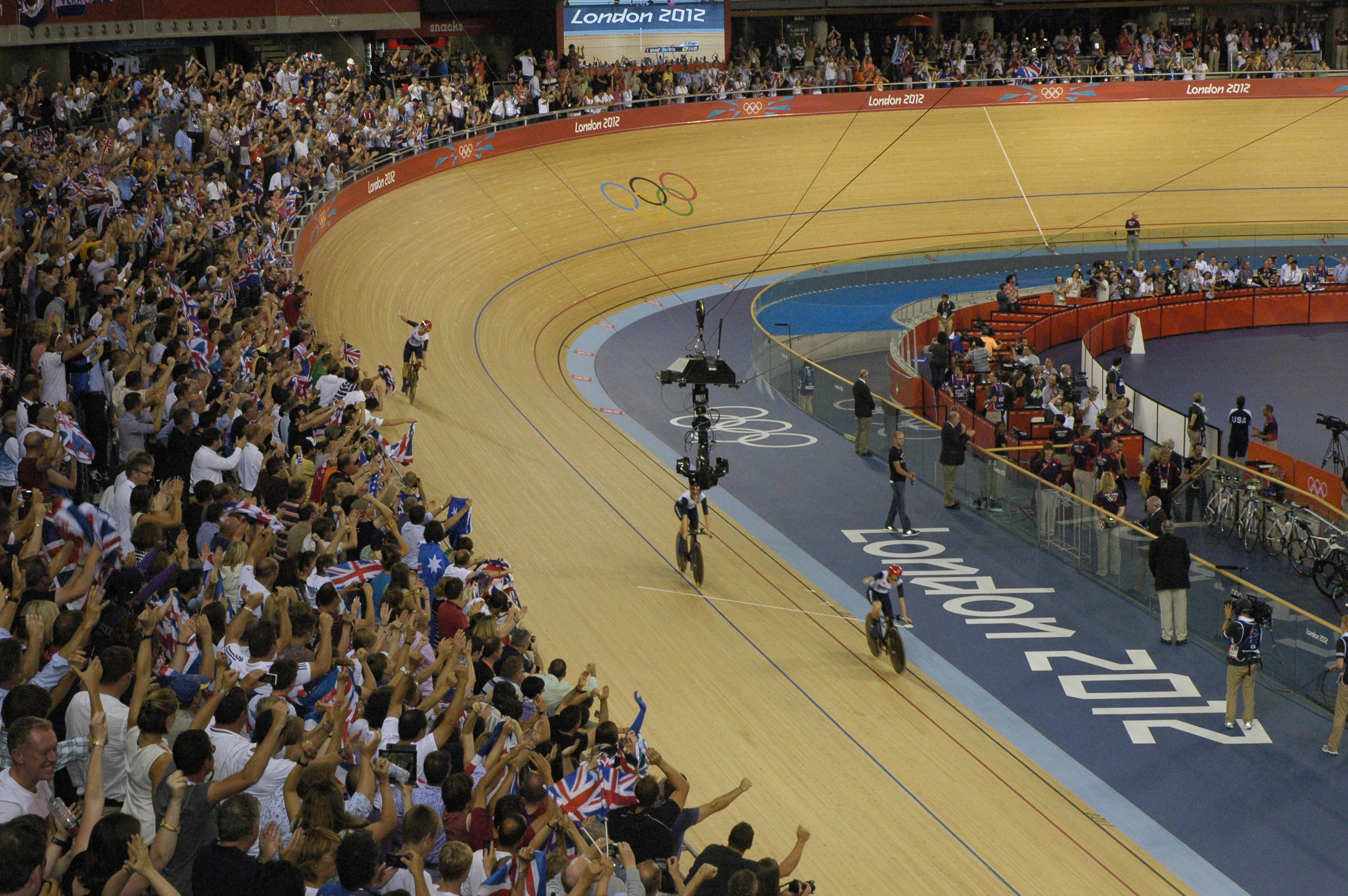
- The British team celebrating their victory
- Venue: London Velopark
- Date: 3 to 4 August
- Competitors: 32 from 10 nations
- Winning time: 3:14.051 WR, OR

Medalists
1st place, gold medalist(s)		Dani King; Laura Trott; Joanna Rowsell	Great Britain
2nd place, silver medalist(s)		Sarah Hammer; Dotsie Bausch; Jennie Reed; Lauren Tamayo	United States
3rd place, bronze medalist(s)		Tara Whitten; Gillian Carleton; Jasmin Glaesser	Canada

The women's cycling team pursuit at the 2012 Olympic Games in London was held at the London Velopark on 3 and 4 August.

The Great Britain team consisting of Dani King, Laura Trott and Joanna Rowsell won the gold medal in world record-breaking time. Including pre-Olympic races and the Olympic final itself, in the six times they had ridden together they had broken the world record in every race. Sarah Hammer, Dotsie Bausch and Jennie Reed of the United States took the silver medal and Canada's Tara Whitten, Gillian Carleton and Jasmin Glaesser won bronze.

== Competition format ==
The women's team pursuit race consists of a 3 km race between two teams of three cyclists, starting on opposite sides of the track. If one team catches the other, the race is over.

The tournament consisted of an initial qualifying round. The top four teams in the qualifying round remained in contention for the gold medal, the 5th to 8th place teams could compete for a possible bronze, and the remaining teams were eliminated.

The "first round" consisted of the four fastest qualifiers competing in head-to-head races (1st vs. 4th, 2nd vs. 3rd). The winners of these heats advanced to the gold medal final. The other four qualifiers also competed in the first round (5th vs. 8th, 6th vs. 7th). Advancement to the bronze medal final was based solely on time, with the fastest two teams among the six qualifiers who had not advanced to the gold medal final reaching the bronze medal final. Qualification races were also held to determine 5th/6th place (between the next two fastest first-round teams who had not reached either the gold or bronze finals) and 7th/8th place (among the remaining two first-round teams).

== Schedule ==
All times are British Summer Time

Date	Time	Round
Friday 3 August 2012	17:00	Qualification
Saturday 4 August 2012	16:10	First round and finals

== Results ==
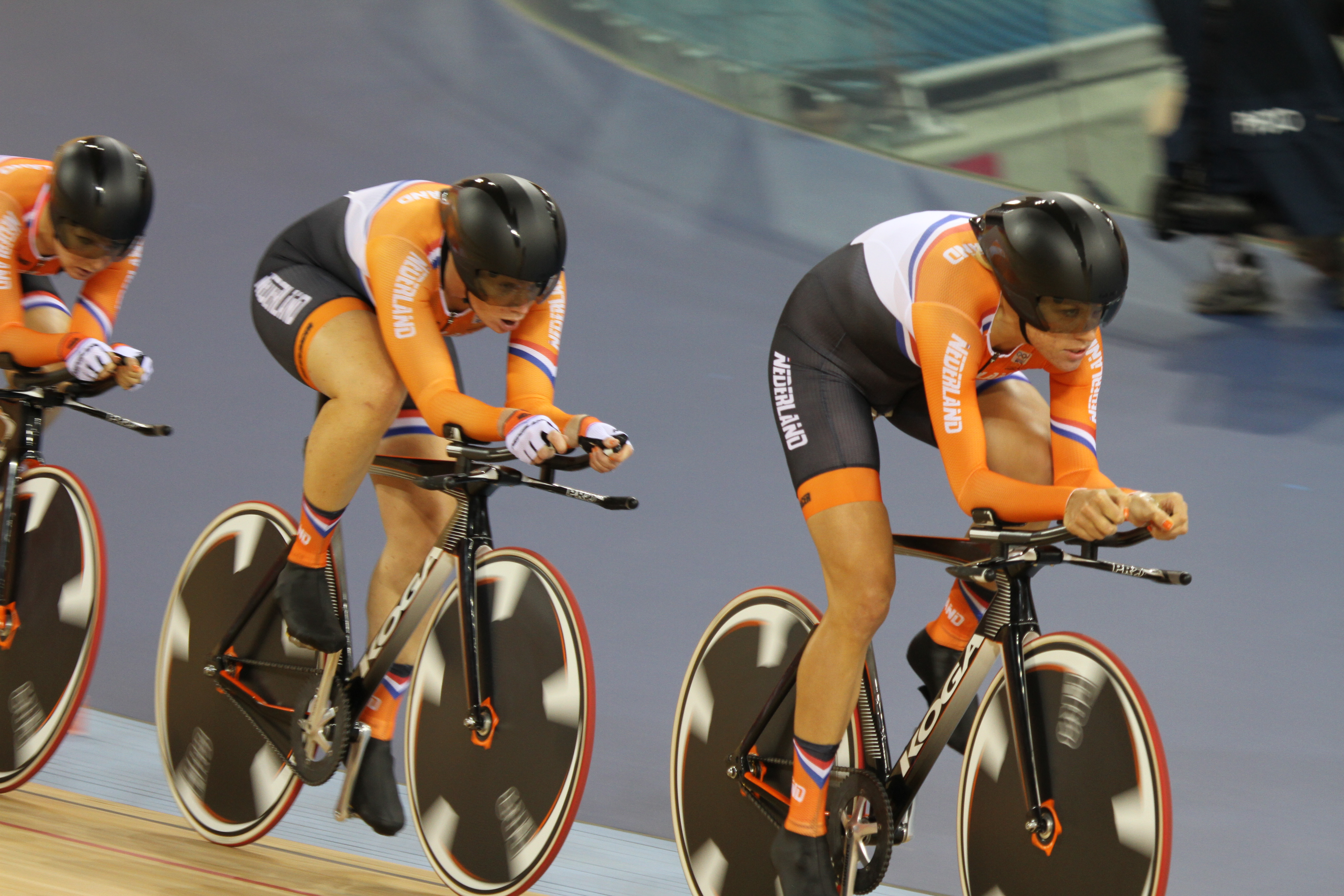
The Dutch team (Ellen van Dijk, Kirsten Wild, Amy Pieters) riding the qualification

=== Qualification ===
Rank	Country	Cyclists	Result	Notes
1	Great Britain	Dani King; Laura Trott; Joanna Rowsell	3:15.669	Q, WR, OR
2	United States	Sarah Hammer; Dotsie Bausch; Jennie Reed	3:19.406	Q
3	Australia	Annette Edmondson; Melissa Hoskins; Josephine Tomic	3:19.719	Q
4	Canada	Tara Whitten; Gillian Carleton; Jasmin Glaesser	3:19.816	Q
5	New Zealand	Lauren Ellis; Jaime Nielsen; Alison Shanks	3:20.421	Q
6	Netherlands	Kirsten Wild; Amy Pieters; Ellen van Dijk	3:21.602	Q
7	Germany	Judith Arndt; Charlotte Becker; Lisa Brennauer	3:22.058	Q
8	Belarus	Tatsiana Sharakova; Alena Dylko; Aksana Papko	3:22.850	Q
9	Ukraine	Yelyzaveta Bochkaryova; Svitlana Halyuk; Lesya Kalytovska	3:25.160	
10	China	Jiang Fan; Jiang Wenwen; Liang Jing	3:26.049	

=== First round ===
Rank	Heat	Country	Cyclists	Result	Notes
1	4	Great Britain	Dani King; Laura Trott; Joanna Rowsell	3:14.682	WR, OR
2	3	United States	Sarah Hammer; Dotsie Bausch; Jennie Reed	3:16.853	NR
3	3	Australia	Annette Edmondson; Melissa Hoskins; Josephine Tomic	3:16.935	OC
4	4	Canada	Tara Whitten; Gillian Carleton; Jasmin Glaesser	3:17.454	NR
5	2	New Zealand	Lauren Ellis; Jaime Nielsen; Alison Shanks	3:18.514	NR
6	1	Netherlands	Kirsten Wild; Vera Koedooder; Ellen van Dijk	3:20.013	NR
7	1	Germany	Judith Arndt; Charlotte Becker; Lisa Brennauer	3:21.086	
8	2	Belarus	Tatsiana Sharakova; Alena Dylko; Aksana Papko	3:21.942	

=== Finals ===
==== Final 7th–8th place ====
Rank	Country	Cyclists	Result	Notes
7	Belarus	Tatsiana Sharakova; Alena Dylko; Aksana Papko	3:20.245	NR
8	Germany	Judith Arndt; Charlotte Becker; Lisa Brennauer	3:20.824	NR

==== Final 5th–6th place ====
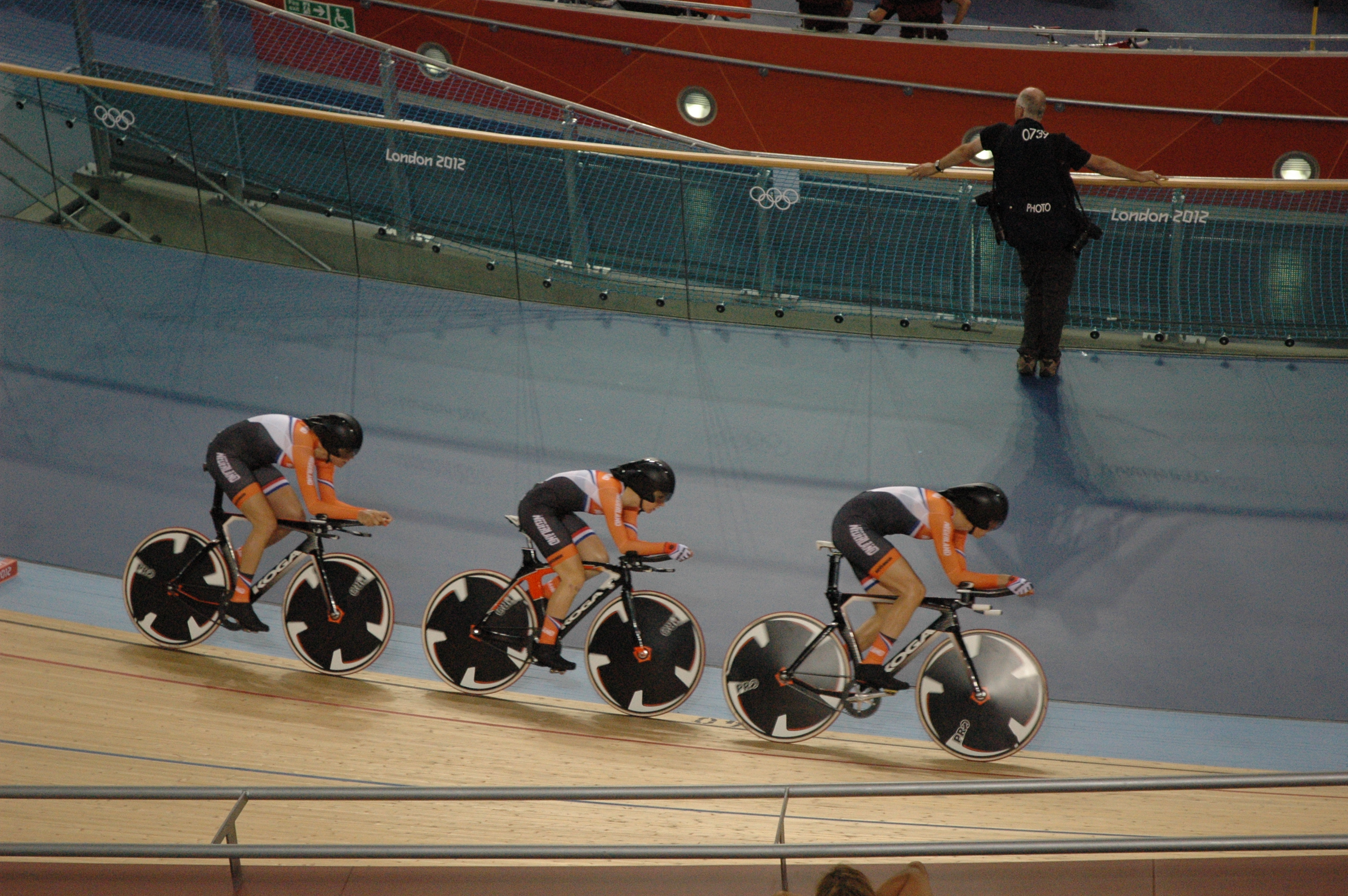
The Dutch team (Ellen van Dijk, Amy Pieters, Vera Koedooder) riding the final for 5th place

Rank	Country	Cyclists	Result	Notes
5	New Zealand	Lauren Ellis; Jaime Nielsen; Alison Shanks	3:19.351	
6	Netherlands	Vera Koedooder; Amy Pieters; Ellen van Dijk	3:23.256	

==== Final bronze medal ====
Rank	Country	Cyclists	Result	Notes
3rd place, bronze medalist(s)	Canada	Tara Whitten; Gillian Carleton; Jasmin Glaesser	3:17.915	
4	Australia	Annette Edmondson; Melissa Hoskins; Josephine Tomic	3:18.096	

==== Final gold medal ====
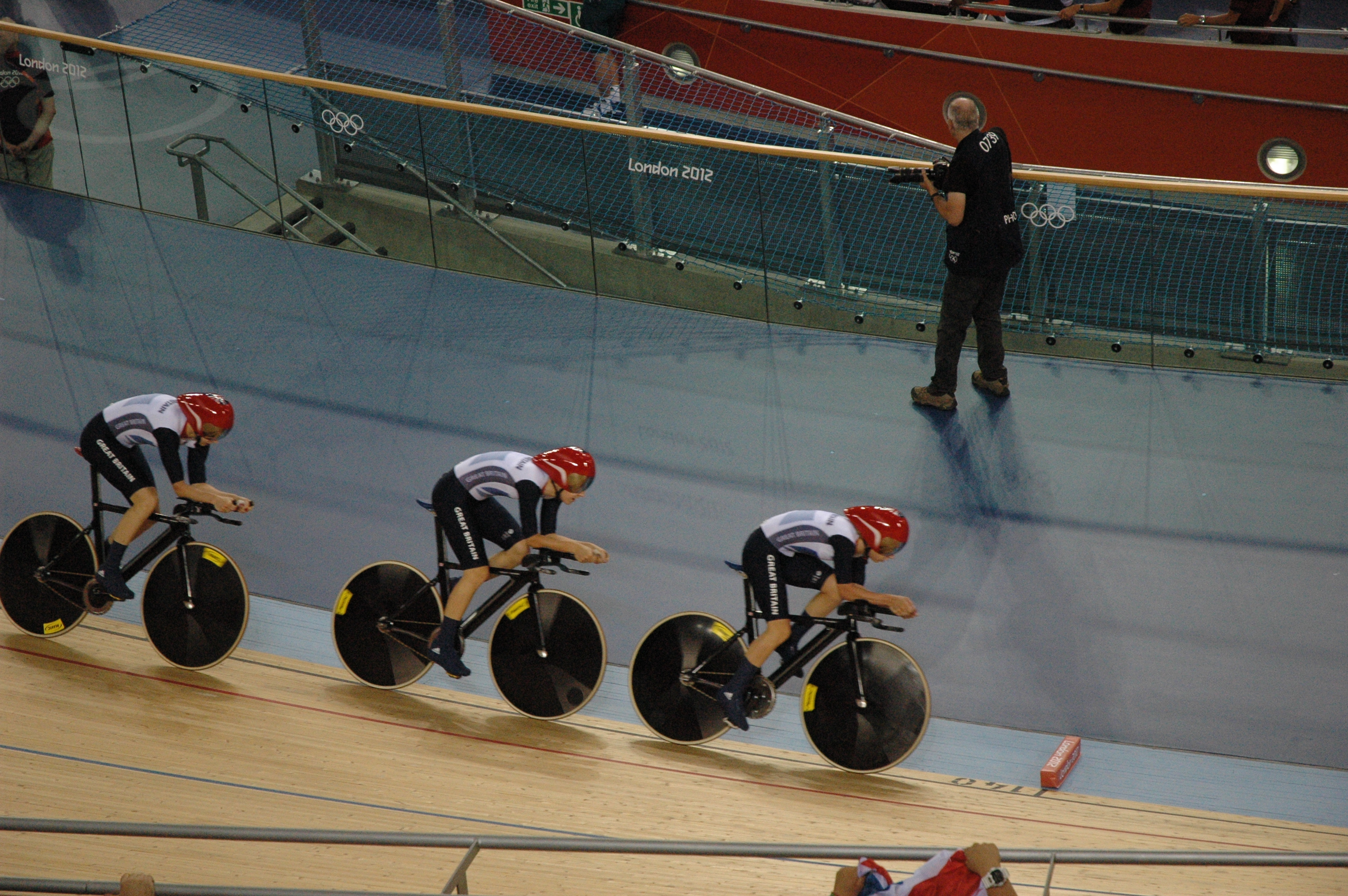
The British team (Dani King, Laura Trott, Joanna Rowsell) riding for gold

Rank	Country	Cyclists	Result	Notes
1st place, gold medalist(s)	Great Britain	Dani King; Laura Trott; Joanna Rowsell	3:14.051	WR, OR
2nd place, silver medalist(s)	United States	Sarah Hammer; Dotsie Bausch; Lauren Tamayo	3:19.727	

== Final classification ==
In the final classification are also the riders listed who competed during the qualification and the first round.

Rank	Country	Cyclists
1st place, gold medalist(s)	Great Britain	Dani King; Laura Trott; Joanna Rowsell
2nd place, silver medalist(s)	United States	Sarah Hammer; Dotsie Bausch; Lauren Tamayo; Jennie Reed
3rd place, bronze medalist(s)	Canada	Tara Whitten; Gillian Carleton; Jasmin Glaesser
4	Australia	Annette Edmondson; Melissa Hoskins; Josephine Tomic
5	New Zealand	Lauren Ellis; Jaime Nielsen; Alison Shanks
6	Netherlands	Ellen van Dijk; Kirsten Wild; Vera Koedooder; Amy Pieters
7	Belarus	Tatsiana Sharakova; Alena Dylko; Aksana Papko
8	Germany	Judith Arndt; Charlotte Becker; Lisa Brennauer
9	Ukraine	Yelyzaveta Bochkaryova; Svitlana Halyuk; Lesya Kalytovska
10	China	Jiang Fan; Jiang Wenwen; Liang Jing
