= Gillian Carleton =

Canadian cyclist (born 1989)

Personal information
- Full name: Gillian Alyssa Carleton
- Born: 3 December 1989 (age 36) Scarborough, Ontario
- Height: 5 ft 10 in (178 cm)
- Weight: 150 lb (68 kg)

Cycling career
- Sport: Cycling
- Disciplines: Road and Track
- Role: Rider
- Rider type: Endurance (track); Time trialist and sprinter (road)

Amateur team
- Canadian national team

Professional team
- 2013: Specialized–lululemon
Medal record
Women's track cycling
Representing Canada
Summer Olympics
Bronze medal – third place	2012 London	Team pursuit
World Championships
Bronze medal – third place	2012 Melbourne	Team pursuit
Bronze medal – third place	2013 Minsk	Team pursuit

Gillian Carleton (born 3 December 1989) is a Canadian road and track cyclist. Carleton won the bronze medal at the 2012 London Olympics in the women's team pursuit. In preparation for the Olympics they finished second in the team pursuit at the Track Cycling World Cup in London in February 2012.

== Major results ==
2013
1st Team Pursuit, Los Angeles Grand Prix (with Allison Beveridge, Laura Brown, Jasmin Glaesser and Stephanie Roorda)
2014
1st Omnium, Pan American Track Championships
Fastest Man on Wheels

1st Points Race
2nd Scratch Race

2nd Omnium, Cottbuser Nächte
2nd Omnium, Sprintermeeting

== See also ==
- 2013 Specialized–lululemon season
