= GP Ciudad de Valladolid =

Race details
- Date: June
- Region: Valladolid, Spain
- English name: Grand Prix of the City of Valladolid
- Discipline: Road
- Competition: UCI Women's Road World Cup (since 2010)
- Type: One-day race
- Web site: www.gpciudaddevalladolid.com

History
- First edition: 2010
- Editions: 2 (as of 2011)
- First winner: Charlotte Becker (GER)
- Most recent: Marianne Vos (NED)

GP Ciudad de Valladolid is a women's professional road bicycle racing event held annually in Valladolid, Spain. It was first run in 2010 and serves as a race of the UCI Women's Road World Cup.

The 2012 race was cancelled for financial reasons.

== Past winners ==
Year	Country	Rider	Team
2010	Germany	Charlotte Becker	Cervélo TestTeam
2011	Netherlands	Marianne Vos	Nederland bloeit
