= Joanna Rowsell =

English racing cyclist

Joanna Rowsell MBE
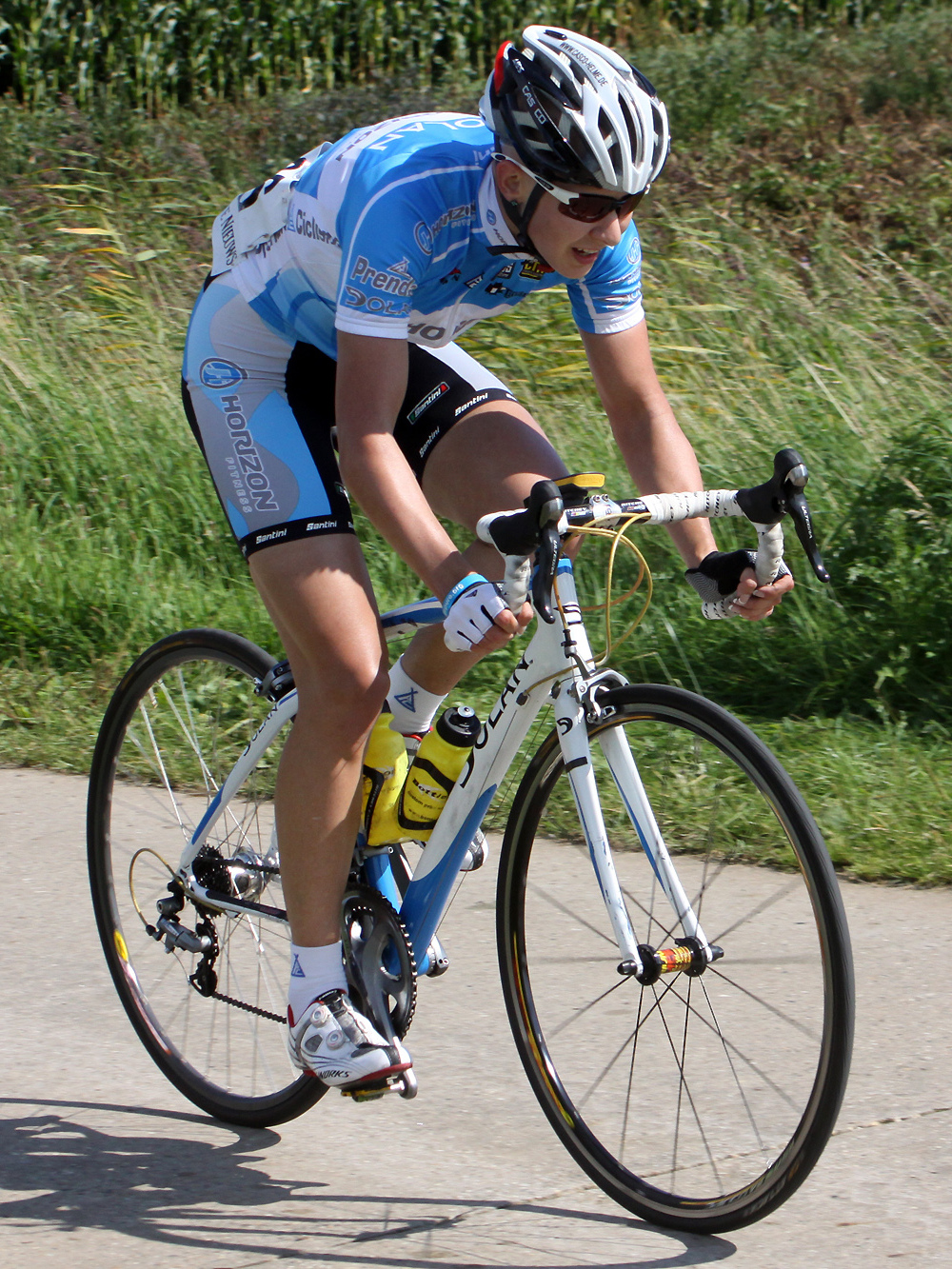
- Rowsell in 2011

Personal information
- Full name: Joanna Rowsell
- Born: 5 December 1988 (age 37) Carshalton, Greater London, England
- Height: 1.78 m (5 ft 10 in)

Cycling career
- Sport: Cycling

Amateur team
- 2005–2006: VC Londres

Professional teams
- 2007-2017: Global Racing
- 2008: Team Halfords Bikehut
- 2009: 100% ME
- 2011–2012: Horizon Fitness RT
- 2013–2014: Wiggle–Honda
- 2015–2017: Pearl Izumi Sports Tours International
Medal record
Representing Great Britain
Olympic Games
| Gold medal – first place | 2012 London | Team pursuit |
| Gold medal – first place | 2016 Rio de Janeiro | Team pursuit |
World Championships
| Gold medal – first place | 2008 Manchester | Team Pursuit |
| Gold medal – first place | 2009 Pruszków | Team Pursuit |
| Gold medal – first place | 2012 Melbourne | Team pursuit |
| Gold medal – first place | 2014 Cali | Team pursuit |
| Gold medal – first place | 2014 Cali | Individual Pursuit |
| Silver medal – second place | 2015 Yvelines | Team Pursuit |
| Silver medal – second place | 2010 Ballerup | Team Pursuit |
| Bronze medal – third place | 2016 London | Team pursuit |
U23 European Track Championships
| Gold medal – first place | 2008 Pruszków | Team Pursuit |
| Bronze medal – third place | 2008 Pruszków | Individual Pursuit |
European Track Championships
| Gold medal – first place | 2011 Apeldoorn | Team Pursuit |
| Gold medal – first place | 2013 Apeldoorn | Team Pursuit |
| Gold medal – first place | 2014 Guadeloupe | Team Pursuit |
| Gold medal – first place | 2015 Grenchen | Team pursuit |
Representing England
Commonwealth Games
| Gold medal – first place | 2014 Glasgow | Individual Pursuit |

Joanna Katie Rowsell MBE (born 5 December 1988) is a retired English cyclist on the Great Britain Cycling Team who competed on track and road.

Her greatest successes were the gold medals won in the women's team pursuit at the 2012 London Olympics and the 2016 Rio Olympics as well as five World Championship titles, four in the team pursuit (2008, 2009, 2012 and 2014) plus one in the individual pursuit at the 2014 World Championships.

She currently holds the World Record in the 3 km team pursuit.

Rowsell first came to national prominence as a winner of junior national competitions in 2005/2006.

== Early life ==
Rowsell was born in Carshalton in the London Borough of Sutton. She attended Cuddington Croft Primary School from 1993 to 2000 and Nonsuch High School for Girls from 2000 to 2007.

She competed for Sutton in the London Youth Games.

== Career ==
Rowsell was picked up by British Cycling's Talent Team programme in 2004, after being tested at her school. Her first major wins came in 2005 and 2006. As a junior, she won the British National Track Championships pursuit in both these years, whilst in senior competition on the road she won the 2006 British National Women's Series competition. She represented the UK at the European and World Junior Track and Road Championships in these years.

In 2006, she also finished third in the British National Championship and subsequently signed for the professional team Global Racing for the 2007 season. In her first year as a senior, she finished third in the 3 km pursuit and the points race at the National Track Championships. On the road, she finished second in the British National Circuit Race Championships.

2008 saw Rowsell join the new Nicole Cooke-led Team Halfords Bikehut. She also continued to compete on the track, winning her first World Title at the 2008 World Championships in Manchester as part of the women's pursuit team.

In 2012, she won in preparation for the Olympics at the Track Cycling World Cup in London both the team pursuit and the individual pursuit in February. Rowsell was a member of the team pursuit squad alongside Dani King and Laura Trott, when they won the team pursuit event and set a new world record at the 2011–12 UCI Track Cycling World Cup in London. They broke the record again at the 2012 UCI Track Cycling World Championships. At the 2012 Summer Olympics in London, Rowsell won a gold medal for the team pursuit alongside King and Trott. Having already set world record times in both the qualifying and semi-finals in this event, the team also went on to set a new world record time of 3:14.051 in the final.

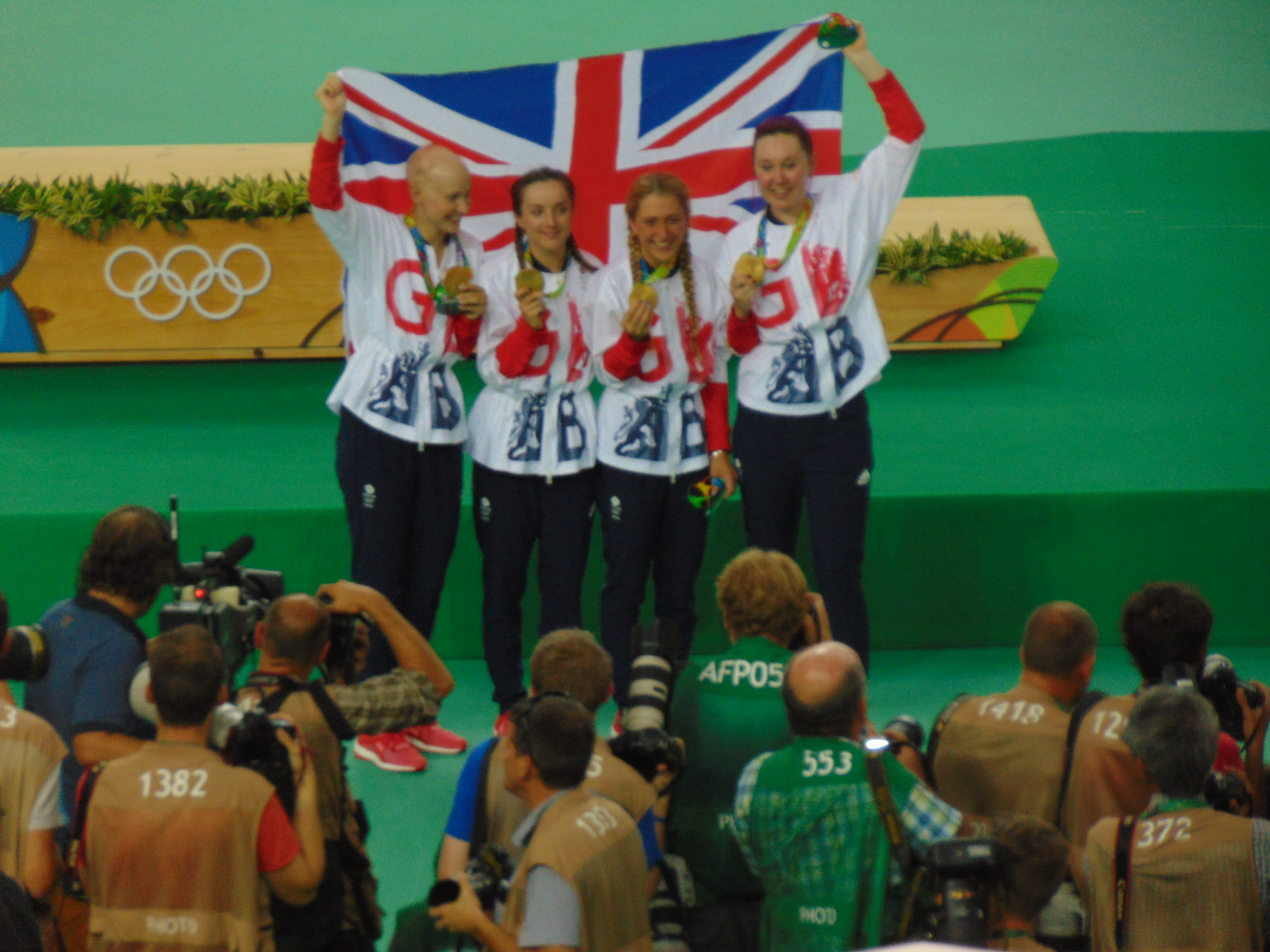
Winning gold at the 2016 Summer Olympics

In 2013, Rowsell broke her collarbone at the London cycling festival but, five weeks later, after an operation and training on a Wattbike with a pillow on the bars, she won the Women's Pursuit on the track at the International Belgian Open in Ghent.

In September 2014 Rowsell announced that she would be leaving the Wiggle-Honda team and joining the Pearl Izumi Sports Tours International squad on a two-year deal from 2015. In 2016, Rowsell won a gold medal in the Team Pursuit at the Rio Olympics.

On 14 March 2017, Rowsell announced that she was retiring from the sport. "The decision to step away has been the hardest I've ever had to make," she said. "I believe I have more to offer the world."

== Personal life ==
Rowsell's younger brother Erick Rowsell is a former road racing cyclist. She was appointed Member of the Order of the British Empire (MBE) in the 2013 New Year Honours for services to cycling. In July 2015 Rowsell married Daniel Shand and then competed as Joanna Rowsell Shand. The marriage ended in divorce in 2020.

After retirement, she studied human biology at Manchester Metropolitan University, before becoming a medical student at St. George's Hospital Medical School in 2020.

Rowsell has alopecia areata, a condition resulting in hair loss.

== Major results ==
2005
1st Individual pursuit, National Junior Track Championships
2006
1st Individual pursuit, National Junior Track Championships
1st National Women's Road Race Series
3rd National Road Race Championships
2007
2nd National Criterium Championships
National Track Championships

3rd Individual pursuit
3rd Points race

2008
1st Team pursuit, UCI Track World Championships
UCI Track Cycling World Cup

1st Team pursuit – Manchester
1st Team pursuit – Melbourne
1st Individual pursuit – Melbourne
3rd Individual pursuit – Manchester

1st National Criterium Championships
National Road Championships

1st Under–23
3rd Senior

UEC European U23 Track Championships

1st Team Pursuit (with Lizzie Armistead and Katie Colclough)
3rd Individual Pursuit

2009
1st Team pursuit, UCI Track World Championships
08–09 UCI Track Cycling World Cup

1st Team pursuit – Copenhagen
3rd Individual pursuit – Copenhagen

09–10 UCI Track World Cup

1st Team pursuit – Manchester
2nd Team pursuit – Melbourne

2010
3rd National Criterium Championships
2011
1st Team pursuit, UEC European Track Championships
1st Team pursuit, UCI Track World Cup
National Track Championships

1st Individual pursuit
1st Team pursuit
3rd Points race

2012
1st Team pursuit, Olympic Games
1st Team pursuit, UCI Track World Championships
UCI Track World Cup

1st Team pursuit
1st Individual pursuit

2013
1st Team pursuit, UEC European Track Championships
1st Individual Pursuit, International Belgian Open
1st National Time Trial Championships
2014
UCI Track World Championships

1st Team pursuit
1st Individual pursuit

1st Individual pursuit, Commonwealth Games
1st Team pursuit, UEC European Track Championships
National Track Championships

1st Team pursuit
3rd Individual pursuit

2015
1st Team pursuit, UEC European Track Championships
1st Individual Pursuit, Revolution – Round 1, Derby
1st Team pursuit, National Track Championships
1st Stage 2 Tour of the Reservoir
2nd Team pursuit, UCI Track World Championships
2016
1st Team pursuit, Olympic Games

== See also ==
- 2012 Summer Olympics and Paralympics gold post boxes
