= Dani Rowe =

British cyclist (born 1990)

Dani Rowe MBE
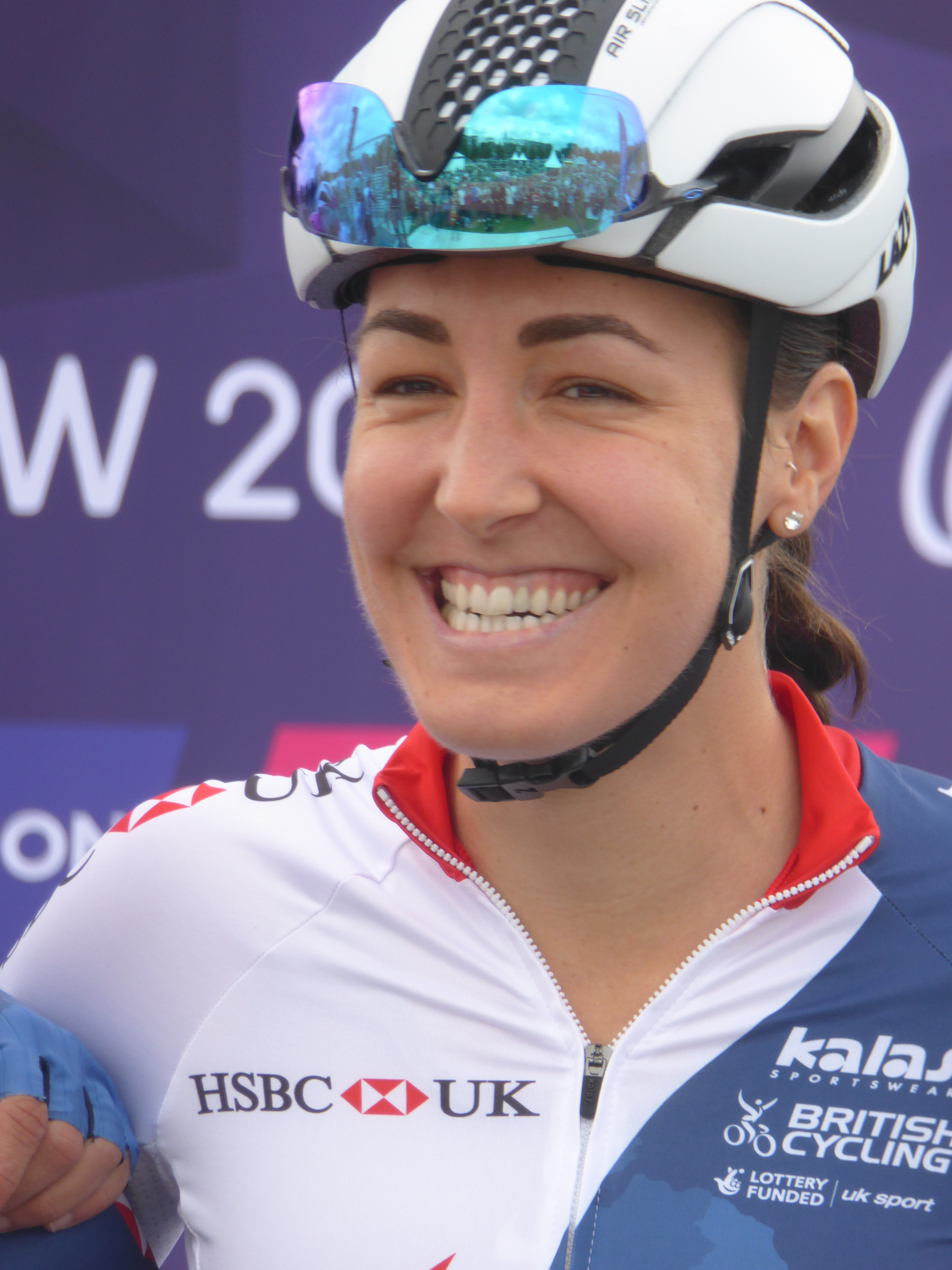
- Rowe at the 2018 European Road Cycling Championships.

Personal information
- Full name: Danielle Rowe
- Nickname: Dani
- Born: Danielle King; 21 November 1990 (age 35) Hamble, Hampshire, England
- Height: 175 cm (5 ft 9 in)

Cycling career
- Sport: Cycling
- Current team: Retired
- Disciplines: Track; Road
- Role: Rider
- Rider type: Endurance

Amateur team
- Horizon Fitness

Professional teams
- 2009: Vision1 Racing
- 2013–2016: Wiggle–Honda
- 2017: Cylance Pro Cycling
- 2018: WaowDeals Pro Cycling
Medal record
Women's track cycling
Representing Great Britain
Olympic Games
Gold medal – first place	2012 London	Team pursuit
World Championships
Gold medal – first place	2011 Apeldoorn	Team pursuit
Gold medal – first place	2012 Melbourne	Team pursuit
Gold medal – first place	2013 Minsk	Team pursuit
Bronze medal – third place	2011 Apeldoorn	Scratch race
European Championships
Gold medal – first place	2011 Apeldoorn	Team pursuit
Gold medal – first place	2013 Apeldoorn	Team pursuit
Silver medal – second place	2013 Apeldoorn	Points race
Women's road bicycle racing
Representing Wales
Commonwealth Games
Bronze medal – third place	2018 Gold Coast	Road race

Danielle Rowe (née King; born 21 November 1990) is a British former road and track cyclist. As a track cyclist, she is an Olympic gold medallist, three-time world champion, and two-time European champion in the team pursuit. She is a member of the British Cycling Hall of Fame.

Rowe became a member of Great Britain's team pursuit squad in 2010, and she became a world champion in 2011. Later that year, she became a European champion in the same event. Riding with Laura Kenny and Joanna Rowsell, Rowe helped Great Britain defend their world title in 2012 and win the team pursuit gold medal at the 2012 Summer Olympics; the trio also broke the team pursuit world record at the Olympics. In 2013, Rowe won a third world title and a second European title in the team pursuit. She missed the 2014 World Championships through injury, and then turned her focus towards road cycling. She missed out on selection for the road race at the 2016 Summer Olympics, but won a bronze medal for Wales in the road race at the 2018 Commonwealth Games having previously represented England at the 2014 Commonwealth Games. She retired from cycling in December 2018.

== Life and career ==
=== 1990–2011: Early life and becoming a world champion ===
Rowe was born in Hamble, Hampshire on 21 November 1990. Her father, Trevor King, is a former biathlete who competed in both the 1984 and 1988 Winter Olympics, and Rowe has stated that he was "inspirational" for her. She went to school at Hamble Community Sports College before attending Barton Peveril Sixth Form College. As a child, Rowe initially competed in swimming, but in 2005, she participated in testing hosted by British Cycling at her school, who then selected her to join its Talent Team. (Note: Founded by Ian Drake in 2002, British Cycling's The Talent Team is a programme where they visit secondary schools to identify children who display talent in the sport) Later that year, she joined the Portsmouth School of Cycle Racing, based in the Mountbatten Centre in Portsmouth.

Rowe finished third in the cyclo-cross National Championships the following winter, and subsequently joined Great Britain's Olympic Development sprint squad. She entered the junior category at the 2007 European Track Championships, finishing ninth in the sprint and twelfth in the keirin. She then switched to the endurance squad. In October 2008, she was released from British Cycling's roster, leaving her without coaching and a professional team. She then joined the Vision1 Racing team whose riders included Nicole Cooke. That year, Rowe won the British National Circuit Race Championships, and the National Derny Championships. She also became a national champion in the madison with Alex Greenfield.

In 2010, Rowe was diagnosed with glandular fever. She was able to compete in the British National Track Championships in September, winning in the team pursuit (as a member of Horizon Fitness) and recorded podium finishes in the madison (with Ella Hopkins), points race and scratch race.

The following month, Rowe began training with the national team after passing a selection process run by head coach Shane Sutton. Three months later, she made her World Cup debut in Manchester. Rowe, Laura Kenny and Katie Colclough finished fifth in the team pursuit. In November, she became a world champion in the team pursuit at the 2011 UCI Track Cycling World Championships in Apeldoorn. Riding with Wendy Houvenaghel and Kenny, the trio overcame the United States in the final. She also won a bronze medal in the scratch race during the championships.

Rowe secured a gold medal in the team pursuit (with Kenny and Colclough) at the under-23 European Track Championships in July, as well as claiming a silver medal in the omnium. In September, at the 2011 British National Track Championships, Rowe secured victory as part of the team pursuit line-up, and came third in the scratch race. The following month, at the 2011 European Track Championships, Rowe helped Great Britain triumph over Germany in the team pursuit final alongside teammates Joanna Rowsell and Kenny. In November, Rowe won a silver medal in the omnium at the 2011-12 Track Cycling World Cup meeting in Astana. She won two of the events that comprised the Omnium — the individual pursuit and flying lap.

=== 2012–2014: Olympic champion ===
In February 2012, Rowe, Kenny and Rowsell were victorious in the team pursuit at a subsequent leg of the Track Cycling World Cup in London. They also set a new world record time of 3:18.148 in the final. Houvenaghel rode in the qualifiers with Rowe replacing her for the final against Canada. Rowe, Kenny and Rowsell then defended Great Britain's world team pursuit title at the 2012 UCI Track Cycling World Championships in Melbourne. They overcame Australia in the final with a world record time of 3:15.720. At the 2012 Summer Olympics in London, Rowe won a gold medal in the team pursuit, again riding with Kenny and Rowsell. The trio set a new world record time of 3:14.051 in the final versus the United States. It was the sixth consecutive race in which the trio had broken the world record. In November, at the 2012–13 UCI Track Cycling World Cup meeting in Glasgow, Rowe, Kenny and Elinor Barker rode to victory against Australia in the final of the team pursuit.

In February 2013, Rowe helped Great Britain defend their world title in the team pursuit at the UCI Track Cycling World Championships in Minsk. Rowe, Kenny and Barker secured victory against Australia in the final. Rowe won the Milk Race in May, and finished in third position at the British National Road Race Championships in June. At the British National Track Championships in September, Rowe, Kenny, Rowsell and Barker won the team pursuit in a world record time of 4:32.721. She claimed victory in the madison with teammate Kenny. In November, she was a member of the British line-up that won the team pursuit at the 2013 UEC European Track Championships in Apeldoorn. Great Britain overcame Poland in the gold-medal race and also recorded a new world record time of 4:26.556 during the competition. Rowe claimed a silver medal in the points race.

In November, Great Britain twice broke the world record for the team pursuit at the 2013–14 UCI Track Cycling World Cup meeting in Manchester. Rowe, Kenny, Barker and Rowsell won the event with victory over Canada in the final with a time of 4:19.604. The following month in Aguascalientes, in the next leg of the Track Cycling World Cup, Great Britain broke their own record twice more, first in qualifying, then again in the final where they triumphed over Canada. The team of Rowe, Rowsell, Barker and Katie Archibald beat the world record set in Manchester by three seconds, posting a time of 4:16.552.

=== 2014–2018: Bronze at the 2018 Commonwealth Games ===
After being involved in crashes on consecutive days, Rowe was unable to train fully and consequently missed out on selection for the 2014 UCI Track Cycling World Championships. She labelled her absence as "heartbreaking". In late June, at the British National Road Race Championships, Rowe finished runner-up behind Kenny. She represented England at the 2014 Commonwealth Games in Glasgow, finishing eleventh in the road race, fourth in the scratch race, seventh in the points race, and eighth in the individual pursuit. In September, Rowe was part of the Wiggle-Honda team pursuit line-up that achieved victory at the British National Track Championships.

In November 2014, Rowe was involved in a crash after a fellow rider hit a pothole while they were training on roads near Merthyr Tydfil. She suffered a snapped rib cage and a collapsed lung and spent ten days in hospital. Five months later, Rowe claimed overall victory at the Tour of the Reservoir. It was her first race back after recovering from her crash.

In 2016, Rowe finished third in the Cadel Evans Great Ocean Road Race, fourth in the Women's Tour Down Under, and seventh in the Philadelphia Cycling Classic. She then missed out on selection for the road race at the 2016 Summer Olympics. Rowe criticized the decision not to select her. She was the second-highest ranked British rider and Rowe believed she should have been named ahead of Emma Pooley and Nikki Harris. She later launched an appeal, but was unsuccessful. In September 2016, Rowe signed for Cylance Pro Cycling for the 2017 season. In October 2017, it was announced that she would join WaowDeals Pro Cycling for 2018.

In December 2017, Rowe announced that she was switching allegiance to Wales ahead of the forthcoming 2018 Commonwealth Games in the Gold Coast. Explaining her decision, she stated that she has a "strong affinity and love" for Wales where she had lived throughout her professional career. At the Games, she won a bronze medal in the road race. In May, Rowe finished runner-up to American rider Megan Guarnier at the Tour de Yorkshire, and in June, she finished third overall at the 2018 Women's Tour. She suffered injuries in a crash on the penultimate day but was able to finish the race. Afterwards, Rowe stated that it was her "best result" in road cycling. The following month, she finished runner-up in the British National Road Race Championships after she was beaten by Jessica Roberts. In December 2018, Rowe announced her retirement from the sport.

== Personal life and honours ==
Rowe married fellow cyclist Matthew Rowe in September 2017, and she gave birth to a son in 2020. Rowe has a younger sister. After retiring from cycling, she began preparing to run the 2019 London Marathon but was forced to stop training after developing multiple stress fractures in her right leg. Rowe has worked as a colour commentator for TNT Sports.

The Royal Mail painted a postbox gold in Rowe's hometown of Hamble to honour her gold medal in the team pursuit at the 2012 Summer Olympics. Rowe and her team pursuit teammates were also commemorated by the Royal Mail in 2012 by appearing on a stamp which formed part of a set featuring British gold medalists from that year's Games. Rowe was appointed a Member of the Order of the British Empire (MBE) in the 2013 New Year Honours for services to cycling. In 2012, a cycle route in Hamble was named after her, and the following year, she was given the Freedom of the Borough of Eastleigh. In 2024, she was inducted into the British Cycling Hall of Fame.

== Major results ==
=== Track ===
2008
2nd Scratch, National Junior Track Championships
2009
National Track Championships

1st Derny
1st Madison (with Alex Greenfield)
3rd Individual pursuit
3rd Points race
3rd Scratch

2010
National Track Championships

1st Team pursuit
2nd Derny
2nd Madison (with Ella Hopkins)
2nd Points race
3rd Scratch

2011
UCI Track World Championships

1st Team pursuit
3rd Scratch

UEC European Track Championships

1st Team pursuit

UEC European Under-23 Track Championships

1st Team pursuit
2nd Omnium

National Track Championships

1st Team pursuit
3rd Scratch

2nd Omnium, 2011–12 UCI Track Cycling World Cup, Astana
2012
1st Team pursuit, Olympic Games
1st Team pursuit, UCI Track World Championships
1st Team pursuit, 2011–12 UCI Track Cycling World Cup, London
1st Team pursuit, 2012–13 UCI Track Cycling World Cup, Glasgow
2013
1st Team pursuit (with Laura Kenny and Elinor Barker, UCI Track World Championships
Team pursuit, 2013–14 UCI Track Cycling World Cup

1st Manchester
1st Aguascalientes

UEC European Track Championships

1st Team pursuit
2nd Points race

National Track Championships

1st Madison (with Laura Trott)
1st Team pursuit
2nd Individual pursuit
2nd Points race
3rd Scratch

2014
National Track Championships

1st Team pursuit
3rd Scratch

=== Road ===
2009
1st British National Circuit Race Championships, National Road Championships
2011
2nd British National Circuit Race Championships, National Road Championships
2013
1st Milk Race
3rd Road race
6th Team Time Trial, UCI Road World Championships
2014
2nd Road race
3rd Overall Surf & Turf 2-Day Women's Stage Race
8th Individual Time Trial, British National Time Trial Championships
2015
1st Overall Tour of the Reservoir

1st Stage 1

1st Bath, Matrix Fitness Grand Prix Series
4th Team Time Trial, UCI Road World Championships
5th Team Time Trial, Crescent Vårgårda
10th Gooik–Geraardsbergen–Gooik
2016
1st Red Hook Crit (London)
3rd Cadel Evans Great Ocean Road Race
4th Road race, National Road Championships
4th Overall Women's Tour Down Under

1st Mountains classification

5th Team Time Trial, Crescent Vårgårda UCI Women's WorldTour
7th Philadelphia Cycling Classic
9th Overall La Route de France
2017
9th Overall The Women's Tour
9th Omloop Het Nieuwsblad
9th GP de Plouay – Bretagne
10th Women's Tour de Yorkshire
2018
2nd Road race, National Road Championships
2nd Overall Women's Tour de Yorkshire
3rd Road race, Commonwealth Games
3rd Overall The Women's Tour
10th Road race, UEC European Road Championships

== See also ==
- 2012 Summer Olympics and Paralympics gold post boxes
