= Melissa Hoskins =

Australian cyclist (1991–2023)

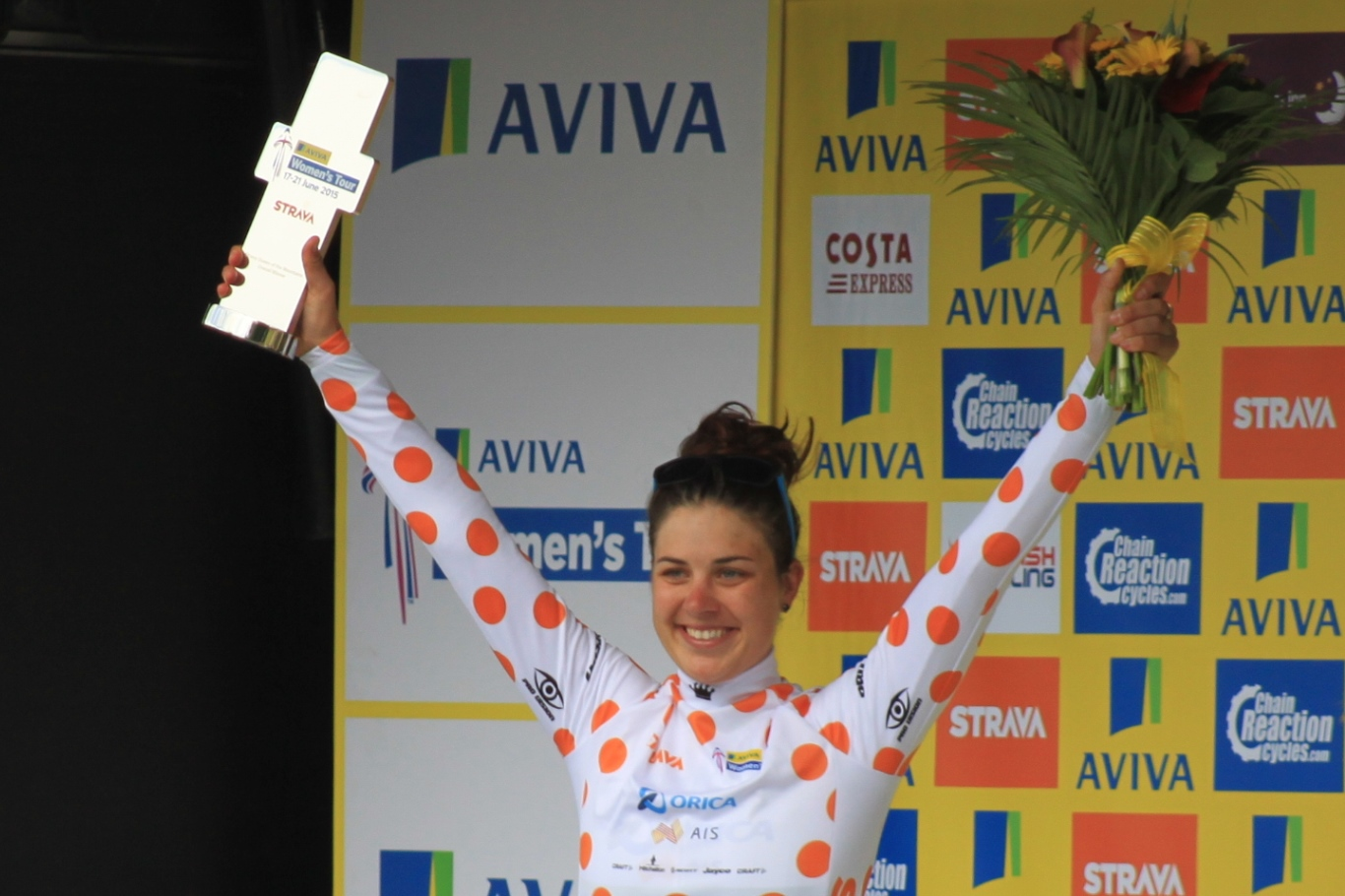
- Hoskins at the 2015 The Women's Tour

Personal information
- Born: 24 February 1991 Kalamunda, Western Australia
- Died: 31 December 2023 (aged 32) Adelaide, South Australia
- Height: 175 cm (5 ft 9 in)
- Weight: 64 kg (141 lb)

Cycling career
- Sport: Cycling
- Disciplines: Track; Road
- Role: Rider
- Rider type: Endurance (Track); Sprinter (Road)

Amateur team
- Northern Districts Cycling Club

Professional team
- 2012–2015: Orica–AIS

Major wins
- Tour of Chongming Island (2012)
Medal record
Women's track cycling
Representing Australia
World Championships
Gold medal – first place	2015 Yvelines	Team pursuit
Silver medal – second place	2012 Melbourne	Team pursuit
Silver medal – second place	2012 Melbourne	Scratch
Silver medal – second place	2013 Minsk	Team pursuit
Bronze medal – third place	2014 Cali	Team pursuit
Women's road cycling
Representing Orica–AIS (2012) Orica–AIS (2013–14)
UCI Road World Championships
Silver medal – second place	2012 Valkenburg	Team time trial
Silver medal – second place	2014 Ponferrada	Team time trial
Bronze medal – third place	2013 Tuscany	Team time trial

Melissa Marie Hoskins (24 February 1991 – 31 December 2023) was an Australian track and road racing cyclist, who topped the general classification in the 2012 Tour of Chongming Island. She was a member of the Australian track cycling team pursuit team that finished in fourth place at the 2012 Summer Olympics. Hoskins announced her retirement from professional cycling on 2 May 2017.

== Personal life ==
Hoskins was born on 24 February 1991 in Kalamunda, a suburb of Perth, Western Australia. She attended Walliston Primary School before going to high school at Carmel Adventist College in Western Australia. She then went to Murdoch University, where she pursued a Bachelor of Sports Science.

In February 2018, she married cyclist Rohan Dennis, and gave birth to a son at the end of that year. The family split their time between Girona, La Massana, and Adelaide. They subsequently had another child.

== Cycling career ==
=== Track ===
As a track cyclist, Hoskins specialised in endurance events. She started track cycling when she was fifteen years old following participation at a Western Australian Institute of Sport talent identification event. She started competitive cycling when she was 16 years old. Her specialist event was the Team Pursuit. She was awarded a cycling scholarship by the Australian Institute of Sport and the Western Australian Institute of Sport. She was a member of Northern Districts Cycling Club. She was coached by Gary Sutton and Darryl Benson. Her primary training base was in Adelaide, with a secondary base in Varese, Italy.

Hoskins finished 3rd in the team pursuit at the 2011 Beijing World Cup in Beijing. She finished 1st in the team pursuit, 2nd in the omnium, and 3rd in the individual pursuit at the 2011 Australian Track Nationals in Sydney. She finished 2nd in the team pursuit at the 2012 Track World Championships in Melbourne, Australia. She finished 1st in the team pursuit and 4th in the individual pursuit at the 2012 Australian Track Nationals in Sydney, Australia. In the team pursuit event at the 2012 Summer Olympics Test Event in London, her team set the fastest time in the event on the opening day of the competition. She was the team's leader in the event but her gate failed to open properly. Her team eventually earned a gold in the event. She earned a silver medal in the scratch race at the 2012 World Championships.

Hoskins competed for Australia with teammates Annette Edmondson and Josephine Tomic in the women's team pursuit at the 2012 Summer Olympics. They finished in fourth place after losing to Canada in the bronze final. Hoskins competed at the 2014 Commonwealth Games. At the 2015 UCI Track Cycling World Championships in Saint-Quentin-en-Yvelines, Hoskins was part of the Australian quartet that won gold in the team pursuit, defeating a Great Britain team in the final that had taken the rainbow jersey in the previous four World Championships and that had been undefeated in major competitions during that period. They also broke the world record which had been set by the British in 2013 at altitude in Aguascalientes City by nearly three seconds. She subsequently described this performance as the defining result of her career.

Hoskins returned to the Olympic Games as part of the Australian team in the team pursuit at the 2016 Summer Olympics: the team entered the Olympics as one of the expected challengers for the gold medal. They were set back three days before the start of competition when four of their five selected riders – Hoskins, Ashlee Ankudinoff, Amy Cure and Georgia Baker – crashed when training on the Rio Olympic Velodrome. Although she avoided major injury, Hoskins was on crutches until the eve of the qualifying round. She rode in qualification and the first round proper but was dropped for the final, where Australia secured fifth overall.

=== Road ===
Hoskins also competed in road races and began racing professionally with the Orica–AIS team in 2012, specialising in sprint finishes on the flat. She won the first and third stages and topped the general classification in the 2012 Tour of Chongming Island, a category 2.1 stage race, and followed this by finishing second in the one-day Tour of Chongming Island World Cup.

== Death ==
On 30 December 2023, Hoskins was struck by a grey ute on Avenel Gardens Road, Medindie, an inner northern suburb of Adelaide, and died a day later from her injuries in hospital. She was 32. Police arrested her husband Rohan Dennis, charging him with causing death by dangerous driving, driving without due care, and endangering life.

In December 2024, Dennis pleaded guilty to an aggravated charge of creating a likelihood of harm. Prosecutors dropped the initial charges of causing death by dangerous driving, driving without due care, and endangering life, acknowledging that Dennis acted recklessly but without intent to harm Hoskins. In May 2025, he was sentenced to 17 months in prison with a non-parole period of ten months; however, the judge suspended the sentence on a two-year good-behaviour bond, as Dennis is the sole carer of the couple's two children. Judge Ian Press emphasised that Dennis was not criminally responsible for causing his wife's death, but his conviction related to driving up to 75 m (246 ft) while Hoskins was clinging to the bonnet of his car. She died after he had sped up, not knowing that she was still clinging to the side of the car, subsequently falling off and under it.

== Major results ==
=== Track ===
2008
1st Team pursuit, National Track Championships
2nd Keirin, National Junior Track Championships
2009
1st Team pursuit, UCI Juniors Track World Championships
1st Team pursuit, National Track Championships
National Junior Track Championships

1st Keirin
3rd Individual pursuit
3rd Points race

2010
Oceania Track Championships

1st Omnium
3rd Points race

2011
3rd Team pursuit, 2010–11 UCI Track Cycling World Cup Classics, Beijing
2012
1st Scratch, 2011–12 UCI Track Cycling World Cup, London
UCI Track Cycling World Championships

2nd Scratch
2nd Team pursuit

2nd Team pursuit, 2012–13 UCI Track Cycling World Cup, Glasgow
2013
2nd Team pursuit, UCI Track Cycling World Championships
3rd Team pursuit, 2013–14 UCI Track Cycling World Cup, Aguascalientes
2014
2nd Team pursuit, 2014–15 UCI Track Cycling World Cup, London
3rd Team pursuit, UCI Track Cycling World Championships
2015
1st Team pursuit, UCI Track Cycling World Championships
1st Points race, National Track Championships

=== Road ===
2009
1st Criterium, National Junior Road Championships
1st Pemberton Classic
2010
2nd Noosa GP
2011
1st Ronde van Appelscha
1st Profronde van Surhuisterveen
1st Wielerdag van Monster
1st Begijnendijk
1st Boutersem
1st Stage 2 Tour de Feminin-O cenu Českého Švýcarska
2nd Le Bizet
2nd Wielerdag Zoeterwoude
2nd Ronde van Leiderdorp
3rd Ronde van Luyksgestel
7th GP Comune di Cornaredo
2012
National Road Championships

1st Under-23 criterium
2nd Criterium

1st Overall Tour of Chongming Island

1st Points classification
1st Stages 1 & 3

1st Overall Bay Classic Series
1st Rond van Uitgeest
2nd Team time trial, UCI Road World Championships
2nd Tour of Chongming Island World Cup
6th EPZ Omloop van Borsele
2013
1st Overall Bay Classic Series

1st Williamstown Criterium

3rd Team time trial, UCI Road World Championships
3rd Open de Suède Vårgårda TTT
2014
2nd Team time trial, UCI Road World Championships
3rd Ronde van Gelderland
5th Tour of Chongming Island World Cup
6th Overall Ladies Tour of Qatar
6th Dwars door de Westhoek
10th Road race, Commonwealth Games
2015
1st Mountains classification The Women's Tour
2nd Overall Santos Women's Tour

1st Stages 2 & 4
