= Jaime Nielsen =

New Zealand cyclist and rower

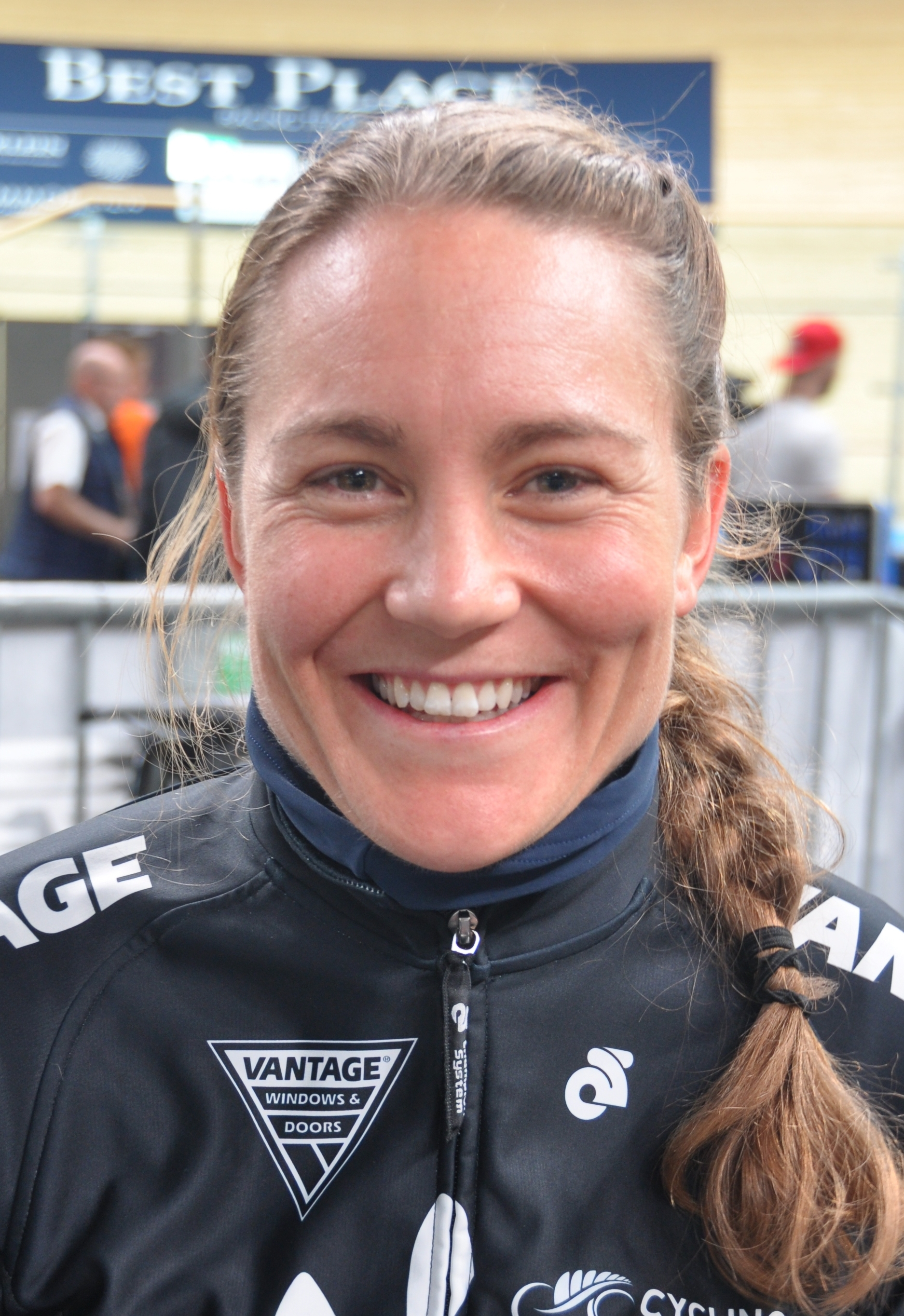
- Nielsen at the 2020 UCI Track Cycling World Championships

Personal information
- Born: Jaime Nielsen; 3 September 1985 (age 41) Hamilton, New Zealand
- Cycling career
- Sport: Cycling
- Disciplines: Track; Road
- Role: Rider

Professional team
- 2015–2016: BePink–La Classica

Major wins
- One-day races and Classics National Time Trial Championships (2014, 2015, 2017)

Sport
- Sport: Rowing; Cycling
- Club: Waikato Rowing Club
Medal record
Representing New Zealand
Women's rowing
World U23 Regatta
Gold medal – first place	2004 Poznań	BW4x
Women's track cycling
World Championships
Silver medal – second place	2009 Pruszków	Team pursuit
Bronze medal – third place	2011 Apeldoorn	Team pursuit
Bronze medal – third place	2017 Hong Kong	Team pursuit

Jaime Nielsen (born 3 September 1985) is a New Zealand track and road cyclist, and a former representative rower.

== Career ==
From 2003 to 2007, Nielsen competed with the national rowing team. She became world champion at the World Rowing U23 Championships in Poznań, Poland, in 2004 with the U23 women's quadruple sculls with fellow members Bess Halley, Darnelle Timbs and Fiona Paterson.

Despite only taking up cycling in 2007, at the team pursuit at the UCI Track Cycling World Championships she won silver in 2009 and bronze in 2011.

At the 2012 Summer Olympics, she competed in the Women's team pursuit for the New Zealand team which placed her 5th and set a national record of 3:18.514. At the 2016 Summer Olympics, she finished 4th in the Women's team pursuit. At the 2020 Summer Olympics, she finished eighth, in Women's team pursuit.

Nielsen won the New Zealand National Time Trial Championships three times and was second five times. In 2017 she broke the sea level world record for the one-hour ride in Cambridge. She clocked 47.791kms in the hour which was 909m more than the previous world's best at sea level.

== Major results ==
=== Track ===
2009
2nd Team pursuit, UCI Track Cycling World Championships
2010
3rd Team pursuit, 2010–11 UCI Track Cycling World Cup Classics, Melbourne
2011
2nd Team pursuit, 2010–11 UCI Track Cycling World Cup Classics, Manchester
UCI Track Cycling World Championships

3rd Team pursuit
4th Individual pursuit

2013
1st Individual pursuit, National Track Championships
2nd Omnium, Invercargill
2014
Oceania Track Championships

1st Team pursuit (with Lauren Ellis, Racquel Sheath and Georgia Williams)
3rd Individual pursuit

3rd Points race, BikeNZ Cup
2015
1st Individual pursuit, National Track Championships
2016
1st Individual pursuit, National Track Championships
2nd Individual pursuit, Oceania Track Championships

=== Road ===
2011
2nd Time trial, National Road Championships
2012
2nd Time trial, National Road Championships
2013
2nd Time trial, National Road Championships
2014
1st Time trial, National Road Championships
4th Time trial, Commonwealth Games
2015
1st Time trial, National Road Championships
3rd Ljubljana–Domžale–Ljubljana TT
9th Chrono Champenois
10th Giro del Trentino Alto Adige-Südtirol
2016
2nd Time trial, National Road Championships
2017
1st Time trial, National Road Championships
2021
2nd Time trial, National Road Championships
