= Yelyzaveta Bochkaryova =

Ukrainian cyclist

Personal information
- Born: May 5, 1978 (age 48)

Cycling career
- Sport: Cycling
- Disciplines: Road, Track
- Role: Rider

Yelyzaveta Bochkaryova, also written as Elizaveta Bochkaryova, (Ukrainian: Єлизавета Бочкарьова; born May 5, 1978, in Lviv) is a Ukrainian track cyclist. At the 2012 Summer Olympics, she competed in the Women's team pursuit for the national team.

== Career highlights ==
2008
2nd Team Pursuit, 2008 UCI Track Cycling World Championships
