= Lauren Ellis (cyclist) =

New Zealand cyclist (born 1989)

Personal information
- Born: 19 April 1989 (age 37) Ashburton, New Zealand

Cycling career
- Sport: Cycling
- Disciplines: Track; Road
- Role: Rider
- Rider type: Pursuitist
Medal record
Representing New Zealand
Women's cycling
Commonwealth Games
Silver medal – second place	2010 Delhi	Points race
World Championships
Silver medal – second place	2009 Pruszków	Team pursuit
Silver medal – second place	2010 Ballerup	Points race
Bronze medal – third place	2010 Ballerup	Team pursuit

Lauren Ellis (born 19 April 1989) is a New Zealand former road and track cyclist.

== Career ==
Ellis rode the team pursuit at the 2008–09 UCI Track Cycling World Cup Classics in Beijing with Kaytee Boyd and Alison Shanks, in a time of 3:28.044, becoming the fastest qualifiers. They went on to take the gold medal in a time of 3:24.421, setting the second fastest time in the world behind the 3:22.425 world record set by Great Britain at Manchester in 2008.

In 2009, she won a silver medal in the Team Pursuit World Championships with Jaime Nielsen and Alison Shanks.

Ellis won a silver medal in the women's points race at the 2010 Commonwealth Games and the 2010 World Championships.

She won bronze at the 2010 UCI Track Cycling World Championships in the Team Pursuit, setting a world record.

At the 2012 Summer Olympics, she rode the Women's team pursuit. The New Zealand team placed 5th and set the current national record of 3:18.514.

At the 2016 Summer Olympics, she rode the Women's team pursuit and Omnium. The New Zealand team placed 4th and set a national record of 4:17.592 during the first round. Ellis also placed 4th in the Omnium.

== Major results ==
2006
1st Individual pursuit, National Junior Track Championships
2nd Individual pursuit, UCI Junior Track Cycling World Championships
2007
1st Individual pursuit, National Junior Track Championships
3rd Individual pursuit, UCI Junior Track Cycling World Championships
2008
1st Points race, National Track Championships
2nd Team pursuit, Oceania Track Championships
2009
Oceania Track Championships

1st Team pursuit
2nd Individual pursuit
2nd Scratch

1st Team pursuit, 2009–10 UCI Track Cycling World Cup Classics, Melbourne
2nd Team pursuit, UCI Track Cycling World Championships
2010
UCI Track Cycling World Championships

2nd Points race
3rd Team pursuit

2nd Points race, Commonwealth Games
2nd Team pursuit, Oceania Track Championships
3rd Team pursuit, 2010–11 UCI Track Cycling World Cup Classics, Melbourne
2011
Oceania Track Championships

1st Team pursuit
2nd Points race
3rd Individual pursuit

2nd Team pursuit, 2010–11 UCI Track Cycling World Cup Classics, Manchester
8th Individual pursuit, UCI Track Cycling World Championships
2012
1st Time trial, National Road Championships
2013
Oceania Track Championships

1st Individual pursuit
1st Team pursuit
3rd Omnium
3rd Points race

1st Points race, National Track Championships
1st Omnium, Invercargill
2014
Oceania Track Championships

1st Points race
1st Team pursuit (with Jaime Nielsen, Racquel Sheath and Georgia Williams)

1st Scratch, National Track Championships
BikeNZ Classic

2nd Scratch
3rd Omnium

2nd Points race, BikeNZ Cup
2015
1st Omnium, National Track Championships
1st Stage 2 Tour of America's Dairyland
3rd Time trial, National Road Championships
3rd Omnium, Super Drome Cup
2016
Festival of Speed

1st Points race
1st Scratch

2019
1st Madison, National Track Championships
3rd Individual pursuit, Oceania Track Championships
