= Liang Jing (cyclist) =

Chinese track cyclist

Liang Jing (Chinese: 梁敬; pinyin: Liáng Jìng; born 4 January 1985) is a Chinese track cyclist. At the 2012 Summer Olympics, she competed in the Women's team pursuit for the national team.

== Achievements ==
- (silver) 2011-2012 Track Cycling World Cup in Astana - Team pursuit
