= Charlotte Becker =

German racing cyclist (born 1983)

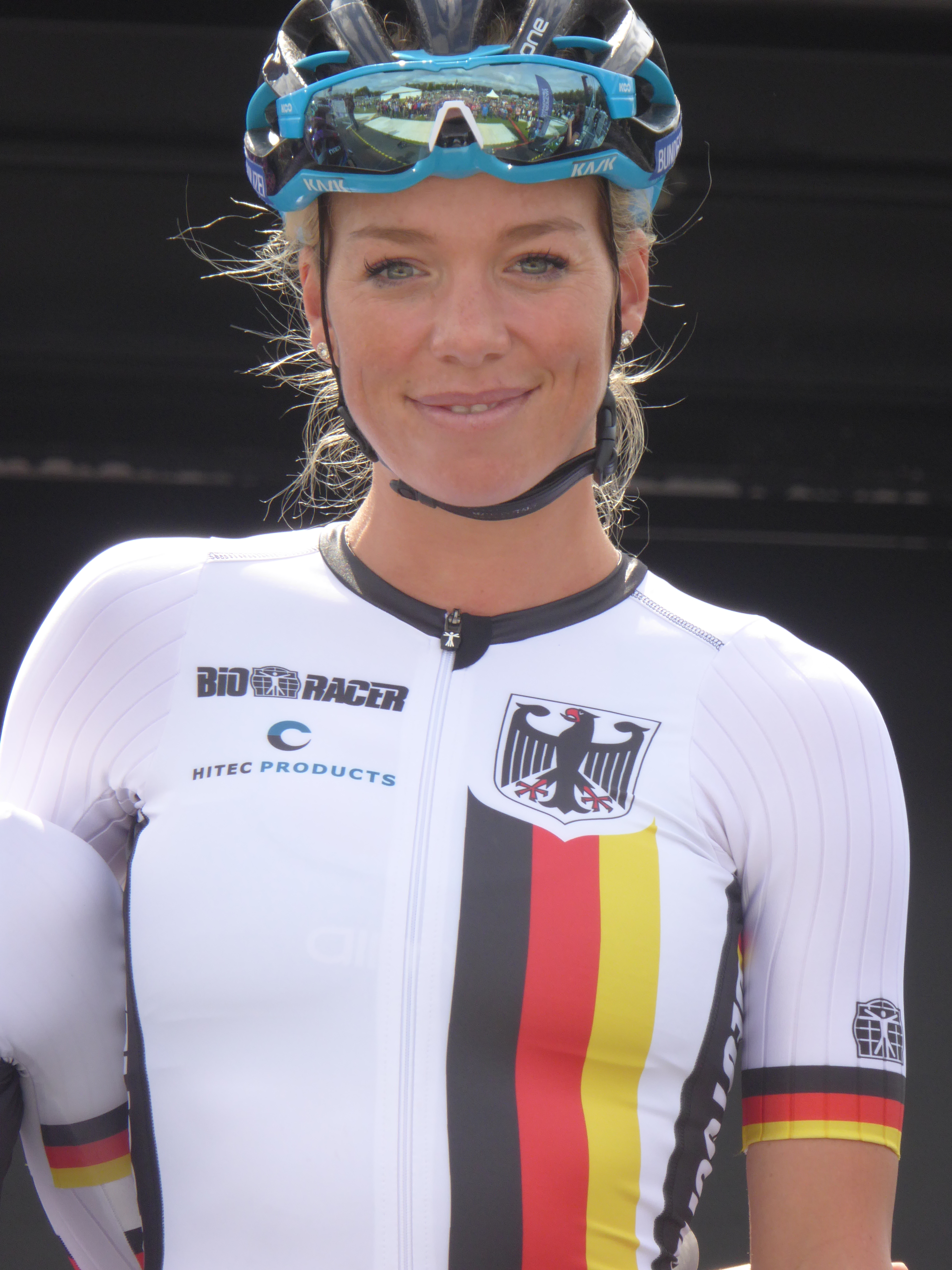
- Becker at the 2018 European Road Cycling Championships.

Personal information
- Full name: Charlotte Becker
- Nickname: Lotti
- Born: 19 May 1983 (age 43) Datteln, West Germany

Cycling career
- Sport: Cycling
- Current team: Retired
- Disciplines: Track; Road
- Role: Rider

Amateur team
- 2005: Red Bull–Stadtwerke Frankfurt Oder

Professional teams
- 2007–2009: Equipe Nürnberger Versicherung
- 2010: Cervélo TestTeam
- 2011–2012: HTC–Highroad Women
- 2013: Argos–Shimano
- 2013–2014: Wiggle–Honda
- 2015–2018: Team Hitec Products
- 2019: FDJ Nouvelle-Aquitaine Futuroscope
- 2020–2022: Arkéa Pro Cycling Team

Major wins
- Stage races Holland Ladies Tour (2008) Tour of Zhoushan Island (2014)
Medal record
Representing Germany
Women's Track cycling
World Championships
Bronze medal – third place	2008 Manchester	Team pursuit
European Elite Championships
Silver medal – second place	2011 Apeldoorn	Team pursuit
Bronze medal – third place	2018 Glasgow	Team pursuit
Women's Road bicycle racing
Representing Team Specialized–lululemon
World Championships
Gold medal – first place	2012 Valkenburg	Team time trial

Charlotte Becker (born 19 May 1983 in Datteln, North Rhine-Westphalia) is a German former professional racing cyclist, who last rode for UCI Women's Continental Team Arkéa Pro Cycling Team. She competed at the 2012 Summer Olympics in the women's road race, but finished over the time limit. She also competed on the track in the women's team pursuit for the national team. She signed for Team Hitec Products for the 2015 road cycling season.

Her older sister Christina Becker is also a track cyclist and competed together with her in the team pursuit.

== Major results ==
=== Track ===
2000
3rd Individual pursuit, UCI Junior World Championships
2001
3rd Individual pursuit, UCI Junior World Championships
2002
3rd Individual pursuit, National Championships
2004
1st Points race, UEC European Under-23 Championships
2005
1st Points race, UEC European Under-23 Championships
2006
2nd Scratch, 2006–07 UCI Track Cycling World Cup Classics, Sydney
2007
National Championships

2nd Individual pursuit
2nd Points race

2008
1st Scratch, 2007–08 UCI Track Cycling World Cup Classics, Los Angeles
2nd Team pursuit, 2008–09 UCI Track Cycling World Cup Classics, Manchester
3rd Team pursuit, UCI World Championships
2009
3rd Team pursuit, 2008–09 UCI Track Cycling World Cup Classics, Copenhagen
3rd Points race, 2009–10 UCI Track Cycling World Cup Classics, Cali
2010
Perth International Track Cycling Grand Prix

1st Points race
3rd Scratch

2nd Team pursuit, 2010–11 UCI Track Cycling World Cup Classics, Melbourne
2011
2nd Team pursuit, UEC European Championships
3rd Team pursuit, 2011–12 UCI Track Cycling World Cup, Astana
2012
Perth International Track Cycling Grand Prix

1st Points race
1st Scratch

2018
National Championships

1st Scratch
1st Points race
1st Team pursuit

3rd Points race, 2018–19 UCI Track Cycling World Cup, Saint-Quentin-en-Yvelines
3rd Team pursuit, UEC European Championships
2019
2nd Team pursuit, 2018–19 UCI Track Cycling World Cup, Hong Kong

=== Road ===
2001
6th Road race, UCI Junior Road World Championships
2006
1st Time trial, National Road Championships
2007
2nd Time trial, National Road Championships
6th Overall Holland Ladies Tour
6th Sparkassen Giro
9th Durango-Durango Emakumeen Saria
2008
1st Overall Holland Ladies Tour
3rd Time trial, National Road Championships
3rd Open de Suède Vårgårda
3rd Chrono des Nations
5th Rund um die Nürnberger Altstadt
6th Overall Gracia–Orlová
8th Australia World Cup
9th UCI Road World Championships – Women's time trial
2009
1st Overall Albstadt-Frauen-Etappenrennen

1st Stage 1

1st Stage 2 Thüringen Rundfahrt der Frauen
1st Stage 2 (TTT) Tour de l'Aude Cycliste Féminin
2nd Rund um das Theater
3rd Overall Giro della Toscana Int. Femminile – Memorial Michela Fanini
National Road Championships

4th Road race
4th Time trial

4th Open de Suède Vårgårda TTT
5th Rund um den Elm
6th Overall Ster Zeeuwsche Eilanden
7th National Hill Climb Championships
7th Frühjahrsstraßenpreis RSC Fürth
7th Allgäuer Straßenpreis
8th Overall Tour du Grand Montréal
8th Gran Premio Brissago - Lago Maggiore
2010
National Road Championships

1st Road race
2nd Time trial

Open de Suède Vårgårda

1st Team time trial
8th Road race

1st GP Ciudad de Valladolid
1st Cologne Classic
1st Ronde van Rijssen
1st Rund in Hamm
1st Rund um Düren
4th Overall Holland Ladies Tour
4th Overall Tour of Chongming Island
4th Ronde van Drenthe
5th Omloop Rond het Ronostrand
6th Overall La Route de France
6th GP de Plouay – Bretagne
6th Omloop van Borsele
7th 7-Dorpenomloop Aalburg
7th Novilon Eurocup Ronde van Drenthe
9th Drentse 8 van Dwingeloo
2011
1st Open de Suède Vårgårda TTT
1st Rund um den Elm
1st City Trophy Elsy Jacobs Team Time Trial
Giro della Toscana Int. Femminile – Memorial Michela Fanini

1st Stages 1 (TTT) & 7

National Road Championships

2nd Time trial
6th Road race

2nd Overall Trophée d'Or Féminin

1st Stages 2 (TTT) & 3

2nd Overall Ladies Tour of Qatar
2nd Omloop van Borsele
3rd Amgen Tour of California Women's Time Trial
3rd Tour of Chongming Island World Cup
6th Profronde van Made
8th Wielerdag van Monster
10th GP Ciudad de Valladolid
2012
1st Team time trial, UCI Road World Championships (with Ellen van Dijk, Amber Neben, Evelyn Stevens, Ina-Yoko Teutenberg and Trixi Worrack)
1st Stage 2 (TTT) Holland Ladies Tour
1st Cologne Classic
National Road Championships

2nd Road race
4th Time trial

2nd Durango-Durango Emakumeen Saria
3rd Dorstener Radsportfestival
6th Overall Giro del Trentino Alto Adige-Südtirol
6th Tour of Chongming Island World Cup
2013
1st Overall NSW International Grand Prix Cycling Criterium Series
4th Launceston Cycling Classic
5th Time trial, National Road Championships
5th Open de Suède Vårgårda TTT
6th Team time trial, UCI Road World Championships
9th London Nocturne
2014
1st Overall Tour of Zhoushan Island

1st Stage 1

1st Jugendrenntag der Stadt Langenhagen
2nd Wielerronde van Valkenswaard
National Road Championships

3rd Time trial
4th Road race

3rd Milk Race
4th Rotterdam
Tour of Chongming Island

7th Overall Stage race
7th World Cup

2015
3rd Overall Tour of Zhoushan Island
National Road Championships

5th Road race
6th Time trial

9th Crescent Women World Cup Vårgårda TTT
10th Team time trial, UCI Road World Championships
10th Overall Ladies Tour of Norway
2016
1st 94.7 Cycle Challenge
1st Rund in Refrath um den Preis vom Autohaus Baldsiefen
2nd Großer Preis der Sparkasse Beckum
3rd KZN Summer Series 1
5th Road race, National Road Championships
6th Team time trial, UCI Road World Championships
7th KZN Summer Series 2
2017
1st Overall Tour of Zhoushan Island

1st Stage 2

1st UNI-Radrennen
National Road Championships

3rd Road race
7th Time trial

4th Sparkassen Giro Bochum
9th Team time trial, UCI Road World Championships
9th Crescent Vårgårda UCI Women's WorldTour TTT
2018
1st Overall Tour of Chongming Island

1st Stage 2

2nd Overall Tour of Zhoushan Island

1st Stage 2

7th Overall The Princess Maha Chackri Sirindhorn's Cup "Women's Tour of Thailand"
Combativity award Stage 4 The Women's Tour
2019
5th Road race, National Road Championships
8th Durango-Durango Emakumeen Saria
2020
2nd Road race, National Road Championships
