= Venera Absalyamova =

Russian cyclist

Personal information
- Born: 11 April 1986 (age 40)

Cycling career
- Sport: Cycling
- Discipline: Track cycling
- Role: Rider
- Rider type: pursuit

Venera Rashitovna Absalyamova (Russian: Венера Рашитовна Абсалямова; born 11 April 1986) is a Russian female track cyclist. She competed at the 2011 and 2012 UCI Track Cycling World Championships.
