= Svitlana Halyuk =

Ukrainian cyclist

- Born: 19 November 1987
- Occupation: Racing cyclist
- Known for: Competed in the Summer 2012 Olympics

Svitlana Halyuk (Ukrainian: Світлана Галюк; born 19 November 1987, Luhansk) is a Ukrainian professional racing cyclist. At the 2012 Summer Olympics, she competed in the Women's team pursuit for the national team.

== Career highlights ==
2007
1st, World Cup, Track, Team Pursuit, Beijing (with Lesya Kalytovska & Lyubov Shulika)
(silver) European U23 Pursuit Championship, Cottbus (GER)
(silver) European U23 Time Trial Championship, Sofia (BUL)
3rd, World Cup, Track, Team Pursuit, Sydney (with Lesya Kalytovska & Lyubov Shulika)
2008
1st, World Cup, Track, Team Pursuit, Los Angeles (with Lesya Kalytovska & Yelyzaveta Bochkaryova)
4th, European Track Championships, individual pursuit, Under 23
8th, European Track Championships, points race, Under 23
2nd, European championships, time trial, Under 23
2009
2nd Tour of Chongming Island Time trial
1st Team Pursuit, UEC European U23 Track Championships (with Lesya Kalytovska and Anna Nagirna
2012
9th Olympic Games, team pursuit
