= Els Belmans =

Belgian cyclist

Personal information
- Born: 30 March 1983 (age 43)

Cycling career
- Sport: Cycling
- Discipline: Track cycling
- Role: Rider
- Rider type: endurance

Els Belmans (born 30 March 1983) is a Belgian female track cyclist. She competed at the 2011, 2013 and 2014 UCI Track Cycling World Championships.

== Major results ==
2013
3rd Individual Pursuit, 3 Jours d'Aigle

4th EK Apeldoorn team pursuit 2012 4rd WK Apeldoorn scratch race
