= Alena Dylko =

Belarusian cyclist

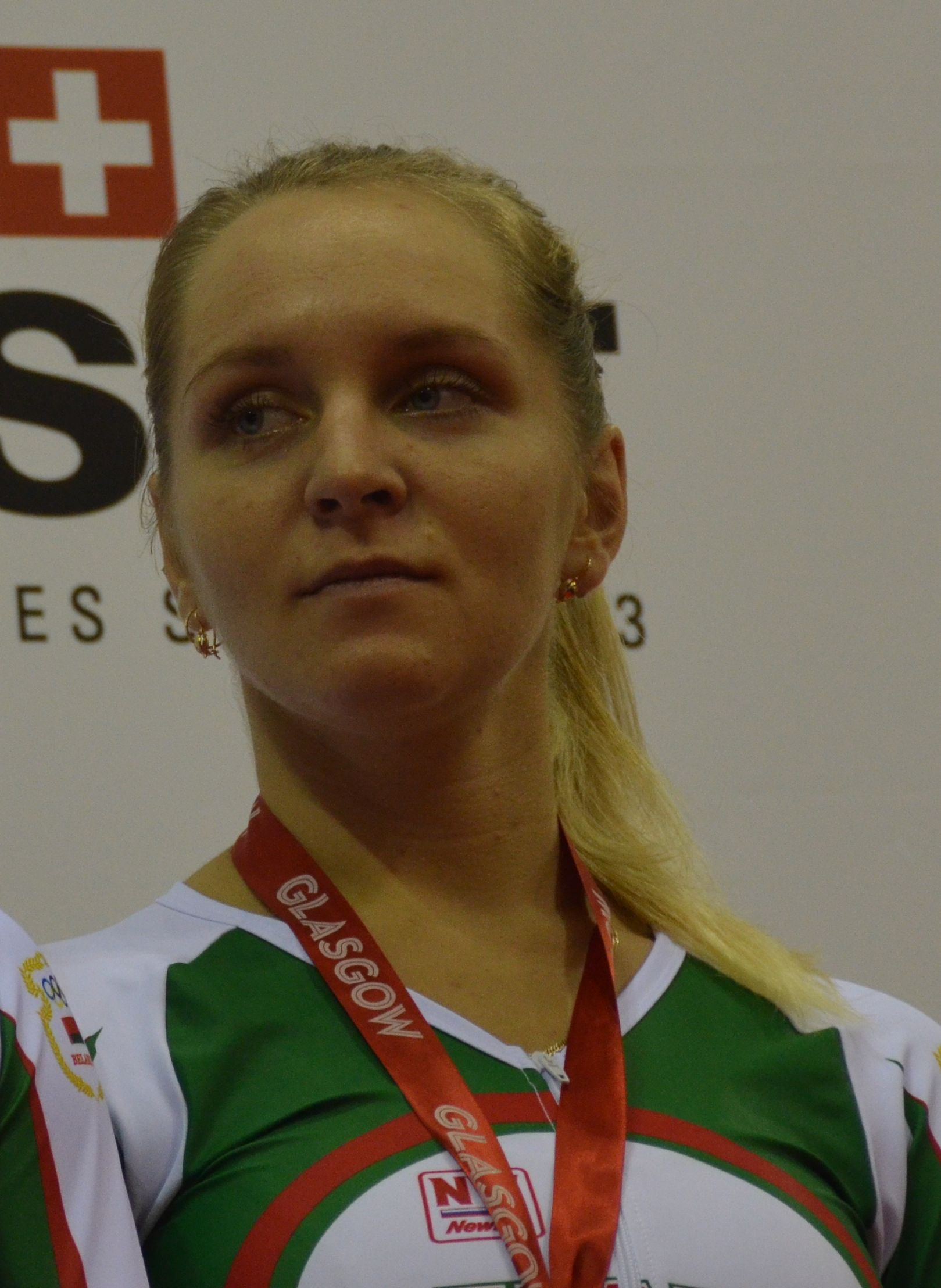
- Alena Dylko, November 2012

Personal information
- Born: 14 September 1988 (age 37) Kossovo, Belarus
Medal record
Women's track cycling
Representing Belarus
European Track Championships
Bronze medal – third place	2011 Apeldoorn	Team Pursuit
Bronze medal – third place	2012 Panevėžys	Team Pursuit

Alena Dylko (born 14 September 1988 in Kossovo, Belarus) is a Belarusian track cyclist. At the 2012 Summer Olympics, she competed in the Women's team pursuit for the national team.
