= Aksana Papko =

Belarusian cyclist

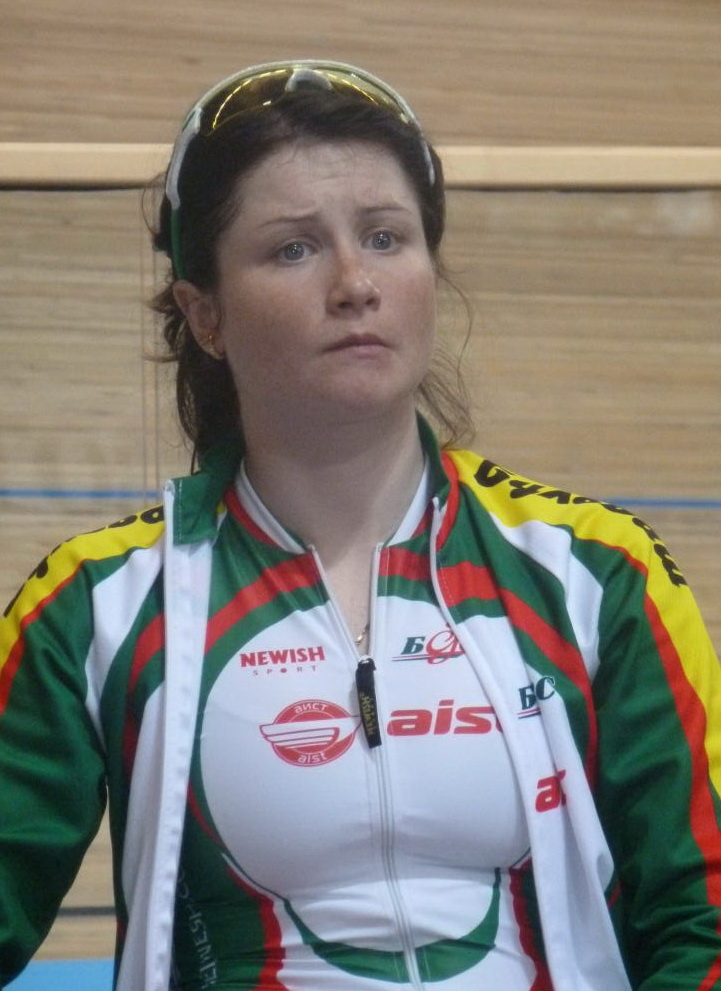
- Papko in 2011

Personal information
- Full name: Aksana Papko
- Born: 16 November 1988 (age 37) Grodno, Byelorussian SSR, Soviet Union

Cycling career
- Sport: Cycling
- Disciplines: Road; Track

Major wins
- One-day races and Classics National Road Race Championships (2010) National Time Trial Championships(2010)
Medal record
Women's track cycling
Representing Belarus
European U23 Championships
Bronze medal – third place	2008 Pruszków	points race
European Track Championships
Bronze medal – third place	2010 Pruszków	Team pursuit
Bronze medal – third place	2011 Apeldoorn	Team Pursuit
Bronze medal – third place	2012 Panevėžys	Team Pursuit

Aksana Papko (born 16 November 1988) is a Belarusian track cyclist. At the 2012 Summer Olympics, she competed in the women's team pursuit for the national team.

== Major results ==
2007
National Road Championships

2nd Road race
4th Time trial

2008
2nd Time trial, National Road Championships
3rd Points Race, UEC European U23 Championships
2009
2nd Road race, National Road Championships
2010
National Road Championships

1st Road race
1st Time trial

UEC European Under-23 Track Championships

1st Individual Pursuit
1st Points Race
3rd Omnium

4th Time trial, European Under-23 Road Championships

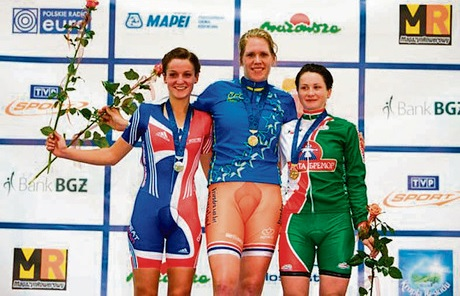
Podium of the points race at the 2008 European Championships: 1) Ellen van Dijk, 2) Lizzie Armitstead, 3) Aksana Papko
