= UCI Track Cycling World Cup – Women's team pursuit =

The UCI Track Cycling World Cup – Women's team pursuit are the World Cup team pursuit for women races held at the UCI Track Cycling World Cup. The first competition of this event for women was at the 2007–2008 UCI Track Cycling World Cup Classics. The distance raced is 3 kilometres, or twelve laps on a typical indoor velodrome track.

== Medalists ==
=== 2007–2008 ===
Event	Gold	Silver	Bronze
Round 1 Sydney	Russia; Evgenia Romanyuta; Olga Slyusareva; Anastasia Chulkova	Australia; Belinda Goss; Katie Mactier; Josephine Tomic	Ukraine; Svitlana Halyuk; Lesya Kalytovska; Lyubov Shulika
Round 2 Beijing	Ukraine; Svitlana Halyuk; Lesya Kalytovska; Lyubov Shulika	Russia; Evgenia Romanyuta; Olga Slyusareva; Anastasia Chulkova	Cuba; Yudelmis Domínguez; Yoanka González; Yumari González
Round 3 Los Angeles	Ukraine; Yelyzaveta Bochkaryova; Lesya Kalytovska; Lyubov Shulika	Russia; Anastasia Chulkova; Olga Slyusareva; Elena Tchalykh	United States; Kristin Armstrong; Lauren Franges; Christen King
Round 4 Copenhagen	Germany; Elke Gebhardt; Verena Joos; Alexandra Sontheimer	Netherlands; Marlijn Binnendijk; Yvonne Hijgenaar; Ellen van Dijk	Ukraine; Svitlana Halyuk; Lyubov Shulika; Lyudmyla Vypyraylo

=== 2008–2009 ===
Event	Gold	Silver	Bronze
Round 1 Manchester	Team 100% ME; Elizabeth Armitstead; Katie Colclough; Joanna Rowsell	Germany; Charlotte Becker; Christina Becker; Lisa Brennauer	Ukraine; Svitlana Halyuk; Lesya Kalytovska; Lyubov Shulika
Round 2 Melbourne	Great Britain; Elizabeth Armitstead; Katie Colclough; Joanna Rowsell	Australia; Ashlee Ankudinoff; Sarah Kent; Josephine Tomic	Ukraine; Svitlana Halyuk; Lesya Kalytovska; Lyubov Shulika
Round 3 Cali	Cuba; Dalilia Rodriguez; Yudelmis Domínguez; Yumari González	Colombia; Elizabeth Agudelo; Andrea Botero; María Luisa Calle	Italy; Giorgia Bronzini; Annalisa Cucinotta; Marta Tagliaferro
Round 4 Beijing	New Zealand; Kaytee Boyd; Lauren Ellis; Alison Shanks	China; Jiang Fan; Sun Feiyan; Wang Cui	Russia; Evgenia Romanyuta; Olga Slyusareva; Elena Chalykh
Round 5 Copenhagen	Team 100% ME; Elizabeth Armitstead; Katie Colclough; Joanna Rowsell	Netherlands; Vera Koedooder; Amy Pieters; Ellen van Dijk	Germany; Christina Backer; Lisa Brennauer; Verena Joos

=== 2009–2010 ===
Event	Gold	Silver	Bronze
Round 1 Manchester	Great Britain; Lizzie Armitstead; Wendy Houvenaghel; Joanna Rowsell	Germany; Lisa Brennauer; Verena Joos; Madeleine Sandig	Australia; Tess Downing; Belinda Goss; Josephine Tomic
Round 2 Melbourne	New Zealand; Kaytee Boyd; Lauren Ellis; Alison Shanks	Great Britain; Katie Colclough; Wendy Houvenaghel; Joanna Rowsell	Australia; Ashlee Ankudinoff; Sarah Kent; Josephine Tomic
Round 3 Cali	Canada; Laura Brown; Stephanie Roorda; Tara Whitten	United States; Dotsie Bausch; Sarah Hammer; Lauren Tamayo	Lithuania; Vaida Pikauskaitė; Vilija Sereikaitė; Aušrinė Trebaitė
Round 4 Beijing	Australia; Ashlee Ankudinoff; Sarah Kent; Josephine Tomic	New Zealand; Lauren Ellis; Jaime Nielsen; Alison Shanks	Canada; Laura Brown; Stephanie Roorda; Tara Whitten
Final standings	Australia	New Zealand	Great Britain

=== 2010–2011 ===
Event	Gold	Silver	Bronze
Round 1 Melbourne	Australia; Katherine Bates; Sarah Kent; Josephine Tomic	Germany; Charlotte Becker; Lisa Brennauer; Madeleine Sandig	New Zealand; Kaytee Boyd; Lauren Ellis; Jaime Nielsen
Round 2 Cali	New Zealand; Rushlee Buchanan; Lauren Ellis; Alison Shanks	United States (OUCH Pro Cycling); Dotsie Bausch; Sarah Hammer; Lauren Tamayo	Great Britain; Katie Colclough; Wendy Houvenaghel; Laura Trott
Round 3 Beijing	New Zealand; Kaytee Boyd; Rushlee Buchanan; Jaime Nielsen	Canada; Tara Whitten; Laura Brown; Stephanie Roorda	Australia; Melissa Hoskins; Ashlee Ankudinoff; Sarah Kent
Round 4 Manchester	Great Britain; Wendy Houvenaghel; Joanna Rowsell; Sarah Storey	New Zealand; Lauren Ellis; Jaime Nielsen; Alison Shanks	United States (OUCH Pro Cycling); Sarah Hammer; Dotsie Bausch; Jennie Reed

=== 2011–2012 ===
Event	Gold	Silver	Bronze
Round 1 Astana	Netherlands; Ellen van Dijk; Kirsten Wild; Amy Pieters	China; Jiang Fan; Jiang Wenwen; Jing Liang	Germany; Lisa Brennauer; Charlotte Becker; Madeleine Sandig
Round 2 Cali	Great Britain; Laura Trott; Wendy Houvenaghel; Sarah Storey	New Zealand; Lauren Ellis; Jaime Nielsen; Alison Shanks	United States; Sarah Hammer; Jennie Reed; Lauren Tamayo
Round 3 Beijing	Ukraine; Yelyzaveta Bochkaryova; Svitlana Halyuk; Lyubov Shulika	Belarus; Alena Dylko; Aksana Papko; Tatsiana Sharakova	China; Jiang Fan; Jiang Wenwen; Jing Liang
Round 4 London	Great Britain; Dani King; Joanna Rowsell; Laura Trott	Canada; Gillian Carleton; Jasmin Glaesser; Tara Whitten	Australia; Amy Cure; Annette Edmondson; Josephine Tomic

=== 2012–2013 ===
Event	Gold	Silver	Bronze
Round 1 Cali details (PDF)	Italy; Maria Giulia Confalonieri; Beatrice Bartelloni; Giulia Donato	SWI Welsh Cycling Track Team; Amy Roberts; Ciara Horne; Elinor Barker	Colombia; Valentina Paniagua; María Luisa Calle; Lorena Vargas
Round 2 Glasgow details (PDF)	Great Britain; Laura Trott; Elinor Barker; Danielle King	Australia; Ashlee Ankudinoff; Amy Cure; Melissa Hoskins	Belarus; Tatsiana Sharakova; Alena Dylko; Aksana Papko
Round 3 Aguascalientes details (PDF)	Canada; Gillian Carleton; Jasmin Glaesser; Stephanie Roorda	Ukraine; Ivanna Borovychenko; Valeriya Kononenko; Anna Nahirna	Team USN; Elinor Barker; Amy Roberts; Ciara Horne

=== 2013–2014 ===
Event	Gold	Silver	Bronze
Round 1 Manchester Details (PDF)	Great Britain; Laura Trott; Elinor Barker; Joanna Rowsell; Dani King	Canada; Gillian Carleton; Laura Brown; Jasmin Glaesser; Stephanie Roorda	Australia; Annette Edmondson; Georgia Baker; Rebecca Wiasak; Elissa Wundersitz
Round 2 Aguascalientes Details (PDF)	Great Britain; Katie Archibald; Elinor Barker; Joanna Rowsell; Dani King	Canada; Gillian Carleton; Laura Brown; Jasmin Glaesser; Stephanie Roorda	Australia; Rebecca Wiasak; Melissa Hoskins; Amy Cure; Isabella King
Round 3 Guadalajara Details (PDF)	Canada; Allison Beveridge; Laura Brown; Jasmin Glaesser; Stephanie Roorda	United States; Jennifer Valente; Cari Higgins; Lauren Tamayo; Jade Wilcoxson	Australia; Isabella King; Georgia Baker; Rebecca Wiasak; Elissa Wundersitz
