= 2009–10 UCI Track Cycling World Cup Classics – Round 4 – Women's individual pursuit =

Round 4 Women's individual pursuit
2009–2010 UCI Track Cycling World Cup Classics, race 4/4

Race details
- Dates: 22 January 2010
- Stages: 1
- Distance: 3 km (1.864 mi)
- Winning time: 3:33.360

Medalists
	Gold	Wendy Houvenaghel (GBR)
	Silver	Alison Shanks (NZL)
	Bronze	Lesya Kalytovska (UKR)

The fourth round of the women's individual pursuit of the 2009–2010 UCI Track Cycling World Cup Classics took place in Beijing, China on 22 January 2010. 17 athletes participated in the contest

== Competition format ==
The women's individual pursuit consists of a 3 km time trial race between two riders, starting on opposite sides of the track. If one rider catches the other, the race is over.

The tournament consisted of an initial qualifying round. The top two riders in the qualifying round advanced to the gold medal match and the third and fourth riders advanced to the bronze medal race.

== Schedule ==
Friday 22 January
12:05-13:05 Qualifying
18:40-18:55 Finals
19:50:-19:55 Victory Ceremony

Schedule from Tissottiming.com

== Results ==
=== Qualifying ===
Rank	Cyclist	Team	Result	Notes
1	Alison Shanks	New Zealand	3:34.558	Q
2	Vilija Sereikaitė	Lithuania	3:40.087	Q
3	Tara Whitten	Canada	3:41.373	q
4	Sarah Kent	New Zealand	3:42.399	q
5	Ah Reum Na	South Korea	3:44.811	
6	Vera Koedooder	Netherlands	3:45.089	
7	Pascale Schnider	Switzerland	3:47.371	
8	Dalila Rodríguez Hernandez	Cuba	3:47.636	
9	Fan Jiang	China	3:47.675	
10	Sofía Arreola Navarro	Mexico	3:48.635	
11	Lisa Brennauer	Germany	3:49.163	
12	Victoria Kondel	Russia	3:51.646	
13	Fiona Dutriaux	France	3:53.487	
14	Svitlana Halyuk	Ukraine	3:53.826	
15	Wan Yiu Wong	Hong Kong	3:58.834	
16	Cui Wang	GPC	4:01.201	
17	Olatz Ferran Zubillaga	FGN	4:04.293	

Results from Tissottiming.com.

=== Finals ===
==== Final bronze medal race ====
Rank	Cyclist	Team	Result
3rd place, bronze medalist(s)	Tara Whitten	Canada	3:40.365
4	Sarah Kent	New Zealand	3:43.868

==== Final gold medal race ====
Rank	Cyclist	Team	Result
1st place, gold medalist(s)	Alison Shanks	New Zealand	3:33.360
2nd place, silver medalist(s)	Vilija Sereikaitė	Lithuania	3:41.679

Results from Tissottiming.com.

== World Cup Standings ==
Final standings after 4 of 4 2009–2010 World Cup races.

Rank	Cyclist	Team	Round 1	Round 2	Round 3	Round 4	Total points
1	Wendy Houvenaghel	United Kingdom	12	12			24
2	Alison Shanks	New Zealand		10		12	22
3	Vilija Sereikaitė	Lithuania			8	10	18
4	Tara Whitten	Canada			10	8	18
5	Josephine Tomic	Australia	10	7			17
6	Vera Koedooder	Netherlands	8			5	13
7	Sarah Hammer	United States			12		12
8	Aušrinė Trebaitė	Lithuania	4	5			9
9	Lesya Kalytovska	Ukraine		8			8
10	Elissavet Chantzi	Greece	3		5		8
11	Sarah Kent	Australia				7	7
12	María Luisa Calle Williams	Colombia			7		7
13	Leire Olaberria Dorronsoro	Spain	7				7
14	Pascale Schnider	Switzerland		3		4	7
15	Ah Reum Na	South Korea				6	6
16	Charlotte Becker	Germany			6		6
17	Ellen van Dijk	Netherlands		6			6
18	Lada Kozlíková	Czech Republic	6				6
19	Dalila Rodríguez Hernandez	Cuba			3	3	6
20	Verena Joos	Germany	5				5
21	Tatsiana Sharakova	Belarus			4		4
22	Madeleine Sandig	Germany		4			4
23	Fan Jiang	China				2	2
24	Yelyzaveta Bochkaryova	Ukraine			2		2
25	Jolien D'Hoore	Belgium		2			2
26	Victoria Kondel	Russia	2				2
27	Sofía Arreola Navarro	Mexico				1	1
28	Tess Downing	Australia			1		1
29	Kimberly Geist	United States		1			1
30	Edyta Jasińska	Poland	1				1

Results from Tissottiming.com.
