= 2009–10 UCI Track Cycling World Cup Classics – Round 3 – Women's individual pursuit =

Round 3 Women's individual pursuit
2009–2010 UCI Track Cycling World Cup Classics, race 3/4

Race details
- Dates: 11 December 2009
- Stages: 1
- Distance: 3 km (1.864 mi)

Medalists
| | Gold | Sarah Hammer (USA) |
| | Silver | Tara Whitten (CAN) |
| | Bronze | Vilija Sereikaitė (LTU) |

The third round of the women's individual pursuit of the 2009–2010 UCI Track Cycling World Cup Classics took place in Cali, Colombia on December 11, 2009. 11 athletes participated in the contest.

== Competition format ==
The women's individual pursuit consists of a 3 km time trial race between two riders, starting on opposite sides of the track. If one rider catches the other, the race is over.

The tournament consisted of an initial qualifying round. The top two riders in the qualifying round advanced to the gold medal match and the third and fourth riders advanced to the bronze medal race.

== Schedule ==
Friday 11 December
13:20-14:00 Qualifying
19:40-19:50 Finals
20:00:-20:08 Victory Ceremony

Schedule from Tissottiming.com

== Results ==
=== Qualifying ===
| Rank | Cyclist | Team | Time | Speed km/h | Notes |
|---|---|---|---|---|---|
| 1 | Sarah Hammer | United States | 3:27.514 | 52.044 | Q |
| 2 | Tara Whitten | Canada | 3:34.547 | 50.338 | Q |
| 3 | María Luisa Calle Williams | Colombia | 3:34.620 | 50.321 | q |
| 4 | Vilija Sereikaitė | Lithuania | 3:36.009 | 49.997 | q |
| 5 | Charlotte Becker | Germany | 3:38.701 | 49.382 | |
| 6 | Elissavet Chantzi | Greece | 3:42.455 | 48.549 | |
| 7 | Tatsiana Sharakova | Belarus | 3:43.464 | 48.329 | |
| 8 | Dalila Rodríguez Hernandez | Cuba | 3:43.925 | 48.230 | |
| 9 | Yelyzaveta Bochkaryova | Ukraine | 3:44.793 | 48.044 | |
| 10 | Tess Downing | Australia | 3:46.568 | 47.667 | |
| 11 | Sinead Jennings | Ireland | 3:53.336 | 46.285 | |

Results from Tissottiming.com.

=== Finals ===
==== Final bronze medal race ====
| Rank | Cyclist | Team | Time | Speed km/h |
|---|---|---|---|---|
| 3rd place, bronze medalist(s) | Vilija Sereikaitė | Lithuania | 3:34.448 | 50.361 |
| 4 | María Luisa Calle Williams | Colombia | 3:34.649 | 50.314 |

==== Final gold medal race ====
| Rank | Cyclist | Team | Result |
|---|---|---|---|
| 1st place, gold medalist(s) | Sarah Hammer | United States | caught opponent |
| 2nd place, silver medalist(s) | Tara Whitten | Canada | caught |

Results from Tissottiming.com.

== World Cup Standings ==
General standings after 3 of 4 2009–2010 World Cup races.

| Rank | Cyclist | Team | Round 1 | Round 2 | Round 3 | Total points |
|---|---|---|---|---|---|---|
| 1 | Wendy Houvenaghel | United Kingdom | 12 | 12 | | 24 |
| 2 | Josephine Tomic | Australia | 10 | 7 | | 17 |
| 3 | Sarah Hammer | United States | | | 12 | 12 |
| 4 | Tara Whitten | Canada | | | 10 | 10 |
| 5 | Alison Shanks | New Zealand | | 10 | | 10 |
| 6 | Aušrinė Trebaitė | Lithuania | 4 | 5 | | 9 |
| 7 | Vilija Sereikaitė | Lithuania | | | 8 | 8 |
| 8 | Lesya Kalytovska | Ukraine | | 8 | | 8 |
| 9 | Vera Koedooder | Netherlands | 8 | | | 8 |
| 10 | Elissavet Chantzi | Greece | 3 | | 5 | 8 |
| 11 | María Luisa Calle Williams | Colombia | | | 7 | 7 |
| 12 | Leire Olaberria Dorronsoro | Spain | 7 | | | 7 |
| 13 | Charlotte Becker | Germany | | | 6 | 6 |
| 14 | Ellen van Dijk | Netherlands | | 6 | | 6 |
| 15 | Lada Kozlíková | Czech Republic | 6 | | | 6 |
| 16 | Verena Joos | Germany | 5 | | | 5 |
| 17 | Tatsiana Sharakova | Belarus | | | 4 | 4 |
| 18 | Madeleine Sandig | Germany | | 4 | | 4 |
| 19 | Dalila Rodríguez Hernandez | Cuba | | | 3 | 3 |
| 20 | Pascale Schnider | Switzerland | | 3 | | 3 |
| 21 | Yelyzaveta Bochkaryova | Ukraine | | | 2 | 2 |
| 22 | Jolien D'Hoore | Belgium | | 2 | | 2 |
| 23 | Victoria Kondel | Russia | 2 | | | 2 |
| 24 | Tess Downing | Australia | | | 1 | 1 |
| 25 | Kimberly Geist | United States | | 1 | | 1 |
| 26 | Edyta Jasińska | Poland | 1 | | | 1 |

Results from Tissottiming.com.
