= 2009 UCI Track Cycling World Championships – Women's omnium =

The Women's Omnium was one of the 9 women's events at the 2009 UCI Track Cycling World Championships, held in Pruszków, Poland.

This was the first time a women's omnium event had ever been included in the World Championships. 16 cyclists from 16 countries participated in the contest. The omnium consisted of five events, which were all contested on 28 March: a sprint 200 m time trial with a flying start, scratch race, 2 km individual pursuit, points race and a 500 m time trial.

The competition was won by Josephine Tomic of Australia.

== Omnium event results ==
=== Sprint 200 m time trial – flying start ===
World Record

World Record
WR	10.831	Olga Slyusareva (RUS)	Moscow (Russia)	25 April 1993

Result

Rank	Name	100m	Time	Speed (km/h)
Rank	Name	100m	100-200	Speed (km/h)
1	Yvonne Hijgenaar (NED)	5.643 (1)	11.400	63.157
1	Yvonne Hijgenaar (NED)		5.757 (1)	63.157
2	Anna Blyth (GBR)	5.703 (2)	11.552	62.326
2	Anna Blyth (GBR)		5.849 (2)	62.326
3	Elisa Frisoni (ITA)	5.714 (3)	11.622	61.951
3	Elisa Frisoni (ITA)		5.908 (3)	61.951
4	Vilija Sereikaitė (LTU)	5.821 (4)	11.800	61.016
4	Vilija Sereikaitė (LTU)		5.979 (4)	61.016
5	Tara Whitten (CAN)	5.842 (5)	11.882	60.595
5	Tara Whitten (CAN)		6.040 (7)	60.595
6	Josephine Tomic (AUS)	5.925 (8)	11.942	60.291
6	Josephine Tomic (AUS)		6.017 (5)	60.291
7	Lada Kozlíková (CZE)	5.902 (7)	11.981	60.095
7	Lada Kozlíková (CZE)		5.766 (7)	60.095
8	Renata Dąbrowska (POL)	5.901 (6)	12.015	59.925
8	Renata Dąbrowska (POL)		6.114 (9)	59.925
9	Lesya Kalytovska (UKR)	6.101 (11)	12.139	59.312
9	Lesya Kalytovska (UKR)		6.038 (6)	59.312
10	Olga Slyusareva (RUS)	6.018 (9)	12.214	58.948
10	Olga Slyusareva (RUS)		6.196 (10)	58.948
11	Diao Xiao Juan (HKG)	6.093 (10)	12.344	58.327
11	Diao Xiao Juan (HKG)		6.251 (12)	58.327
12	Gema Pascual Torrecilla (ESP)	6.117 (12)	12.376	58.177
12	Gema Pascual Torrecilla (ESP)		6.259 (14)	58.177
13	Dalila Rodríguez Hernandez (CUB)	6.128 (13)	12.381	58.153
13	Dalila Rodríguez Hernandez (CUB)		6.253 (13)	58.153
14	Charlotte Becker (GER)	6.151 (14)	12.390	58.111
14	Charlotte Becker (GER)		6.239 (11)	58.111
15	Kaytee Boyd (NZL)	6.279 (15)	12.769	56.386
15	Kaytee Boyd (NZL)		6.490 (15)	56.386
16	Andrea Botero Coy (COL)	6.317 (16)	12.828	56.127
16	Andrea Botero Coy (COL)		6.551 (16)	56.127

=== Scratch ===
Rank	Name	Country
1	Tara Whitten	Canada
2	Lesya Kalytovska	Ukraine
3	Renata Dąbrowska	Poland
4	Gema Pascual Torrecilla	Spain
5	Dalila Rodríguez Hernandez	Cuba
6	Elisa Frisoni	Italy
7	Yvonne Hijgenaar	Netherlands
8	Josephine Tomic	Australia
9	Andrea Botero Coy	Colombia
10	Charlotte Becker	Germany
11	Kaytee Boyd	New Zealand
12	Olga Slyusareva	Russia
13	Vilija Sereikaitė	Lithuania
14	Lada Kozlíková	Czech Republic
15	Diao Xiao Juan	Hong Kong
16	Anna Blyth	United Kingdom

=== 2 km Pursuit ===
Rank	Name	1000m	Time	Speed (km/h)
Rank	Name	1000m	1000–2000	Speed (km/h)
1	Vilija Sereikaitė (LTU)	1:11.631 (1)	2:20.682	51.179
1	Vilija Sereikaitė (LTU)		1:09.051 (1)	
2	Tara Whitten (CAN)	1:12.903 (4)	2:23.950	50.017
2	Tara Whitten (CAN)		1:11.047 (3)	
3	Lesya Kalytovska (UKR)	1:13.085 (5)	2:24.094	49.967
3	Lesya Kalytovska (UKR)		1:11.009 (2)	
4	Josephine Tomic (AUS)	1:113.770 (9)	2:25.841	49.368
4	Josephine Tomic (AUS)		1:12.071 (5)	
5	Lada Kozlíková (CZE)	1:113.561 (8)	2:26.037	49.302
5	Lada Kozlíková (CZE)		1:12.476 (6)	
6	Charlotte Becker (GER)	1:13.381 (7)	2:27.078	48.953
6	Charlotte Becker (GER)		1:13.697 (9)	
7	Kaytee Boyd (NZL)	1:14.282 (10)	2:27.283	48.885
7	Kaytee Boyd (NZL)		1:13.001 (7)	
8	Dalila Rodríguez Hernandez (CUB)	1:15.704 (14)	2:27.450	48.830
8	Dalila Rodríguez Hernandez (CUB)		1:11.746 (4)	
9	Yvonne Hijgenaar (NED)	1:14.602 (11)	2:27.757	48.728
9	Yvonne Hijgenaar (NED)		1:13.155 (8)	
10	Anna Blyth (GBR)	1:12.805 (3)	2:27.918	48.675
10	Anna Blyth (GBR)		1:15.113 (12)	
11	Olga Slyusareva (RUS)	1:15.444 (13)	2:29.295	48.226
11	Olga Slyusareva (RUS)		1:13.851 (10)	
12	Andrea Botero Coy (COL)	1:15.756 (15)	2:30.419	47.866
12	Andrea Botero Coy (COL)		1:14.663 (11)	
13	Elisa Frisoni (ITA)	1:12.650 (2)	2:30.815	47.740
13	Elisa Frisoni (ITA)		1:18.165 (14)	
14	Gema Pascual Torrecilla (ESP)	1:15.302 (12)	2:31.658	47.475
14	Gema Pascual Torrecilla (ESP)		1:116.356 (13)	
15	Renata Dąbrowska (POL)	1:13.305 (6)	2:32.060	47.349
15	Renata Dąbrowska (POL)		1:18.755 (15)	
16	Diao Xiao Juan (HKG)	1:23.603 (16)	2:44.123	43.869
16	Diao Xiao Juan (HKG)		1:20.520 (16)	

=== Points Race ===
Elapsed Time=13:25.936 Average Speed=44.668 km/h

Rank	Name	Country	Sprint Number				Finish Order	Lap Points			Total Points
Rank	Name	Country	1	2	3	4	Finish Order	+	–	Balance	Total Points
1	Josephine Tomic	Australia		5		5	1				10
2	Dalila Rodríguez Hernandez	Cuba		2	3	1	4				6
3	Elisa Frisoni	Italy	5		1		7				6
4	Charlotte Becker	Germany			5		15				5
5	Diao Xiao Juan	Hong Kong		1		3	2				4
6	Lesya Kalytovska	Ukraine	2		2		14				4
7	Gema Pascual Torrecilla	Spain		3			9				3
8	Renata Dąbrowska	Poland	3				10				3
9	Yvonne Hijgenaar	Netherlands				2	3				2
10	Olga Slyusareva	Russia	1				12				1
11	Tara Whitten	Canada					5				0
12	Vilija Sereikaitė	Lithuania					6				0
13	Lada Kozlíková	Czech Republic					8				0
14	Anna Blyth	Great Britain					11				0
15	Andrea Botero Coy	Colombia					13				0
DNF	Kaytee Boyd	New Zealand									0

=== 500 m time trial ===
World Record

World Record
WR	33.296	Simona Krupeckaitė (LTU)	Pruszków (Poland)	25 March 2009

Results

Rank	Name	250m	Time	Speed (km/h)
Rank	Name	250m	250-500	Speed (km/h)
1	Yvonne Hijgenaar (NED)	19.999 (1)	35.242	51.075
1	Yvonne Hijgenaar (NED)		15.243 (3)	51.075
2	Anna Blyth (GBR)	20.063 (2)	35.377	50.880
2	Anna Blyth (GBR)		15.314 (5)	50.880
3	Elisa Frisoni (ITA)	20.236 (3)	35.458	50.764
3	Elisa Frisoni (ITA)		15.222 (2)	50.764
4	Vilija Sereikaitė (LTU)	20.479 (4)	35.660	50.476
4	Vilija Sereikaitė (LTU)		15.181 (1)	50.476
5	Lada Kozlíková (CZE)	20.713 (6)	35.981	50.026
5	Lada Kozlíková (CZE)		15.268 (4)	50.026
6	Renata Dąbrowska (POL)	20.605 (5)	36.326	49.551
6	Renata Dąbrowska (POL)		15.721 (8)	49.551
7	Josephine Tomic (AUS)	21.105 (7)	36.650	49.113
7	Josephine Tomic (AUS)		15.545 (6)	49.113
8	Tara Whitten (CAN)	21.581 (9)	37.451	48.062
8	Tara Whitten (CAN)		15.870 (10)	48.062
9	Lesya Kalytovska (UKR)	21.852 (13)	37.483	48.021
9	Lesya Kalytovska (UKR)		15.631 (7)	48.021
10	Charlotte Becker (GER)	21.706 (10)	37.524	47.969
10	Charlotte Becker (GER)		15.818 (9)	47.969
11	Dalila Rodríguez Hernandez (CUB)	21.521 (8)	37.696	47.750
11	Dalila Rodríguez Hernandez (CUB)		16.175 (11)	47.750
12	Kaytee Boyd (NZL)	21.727 (11)	37.907	47.484
12	Kaytee Boyd (NZL)		16.180 (12)	47.484
13	Olga Slyusareva (RUS)	21.748 (12)	37.992	47.378
13	Olga Slyusareva (RUS)		16.244 (13)	47.378
14	Diao Xiao Juan (HKG)	22.152 (14)	38.896	46.277
14	Diao Xiao Juan (HKG)		16.744 (15)	46.277
15	Gema Pascual Torrecilla (ESP)	22.417 (16)	38.924	46.243
15	Gema Pascual Torrecilla (ESP)		16.507 (14)	46.243
16	Andrea Botero Coy (COL)	22.365 (15)	39.126	46.005
16	Andrea Botero Coy (COL)		16.761 (16)	46.005

== Overall standings ==
Rank	Name	200 m TT	Scratch	Pursuit	Points Race	500 m TT	Total
1st place, gold medalist(s)	Josephine Tomic (AUS)	6	8	4	1	7	26
2nd place, silver medalist(s)	Tara Whitten (CAN)	5	1	2	11	8	27
3rd place, bronze medalist(s)	Yvonne Hijgenaar (NED)	1	7	9	9	1	27
4	Elisa Frisoni (ITA)	3	6	13	3	3	28
5	Lesya Kalytovska (UKR)	9	2	3	6	9	29
6	Vilija Sereikaitė (LTU)	4	13	1	12	4	34
7	Dalila Rodríguez Hernandez (CUB)	13	5	8	2	11	39
8	Renata Dąbrowska (POL)	8	3	15	8	6	40
9	Lada Kozlíková (CZE)	7	14	5	13	5	44
10	Anna Blyth (GBR)	2	16	10	14	2	44
11	Charlotte Becker (GER)	14	10	6	4	10	44
12	Gema Pascual Torrecilla (ESP)	12	4	14	7	15	52
13	Olga Slyusareva (RUS)	10	12	11	10	13	56
14	Kaytee Boyd (NZL)	15	11	7	16	12	61
15	Diao Xiao Juan (HKG)	11	15	16	5	14	61
16	Andrea Botero Coy (COL)	16	9	12	15	16	68
