= 2010–11 UCI Track Cycling World Cup Classics =

International track cycling competition

2010–2011 UCI Track Cycling World Cup Classics
- Nineteenth edition of the UCI Track Cycling World Cup Classics

Details
- Dates: 2 December 2010 – 20 February 2011
- Location: Australia, Colombia, China and United Kingdom
- Races: 4

The 2010–2011 UCI Track Cycling World Cup Classics was a multi race tournament over a season of track cycling. The season ran from 2 December 2010 to 20 February 2011. The World Cup is organised by the Union Cycliste Internationale.

As in the previous season, the rounds were held in Melbourne (Australia), Cali (Colombia), Beijing (China) and Manchester (Great Britain) although there was a slight reshuffling with Manchester moving from the first round to the last.

In a change to the format of World Cup events, only the Olympic events (Keirin, Omnium, sprint, team sprint and team pursuit) were contested at each round. The other World Championships events were contested at one or two rounds only.

== Overall team standings ==
Overall team standings are calculated based on total number of points gained by the team's riders in each event. The top ten teams after round 4 are listed below:

| Rank | Team | Round 1 | Round 2 | Round 3 | Round 4 | Total Points |
|---|---|---|---|---|---|---|
| 1 | France | 61 | 100 | 80 | 67 | 308 |
| 2 | United Kingdom | 82 | 109 | 51 | 60 | 302 |
| 3 | Australia | 85 | 13 | 42 | 78 | 218 |
| 4 | New Zealand | 47 | 62 | 45 | 55 | 209 |
| 5 | Netherlands | 70 | | 62 | 49 | 181 |
| 6 | Germany | 43 | 53 | 25 | 38 | 159 |
| 7 | China | 31 | 5 | 60 | 46 | 142 |
| 8 | Spain | 31 | 32 | 21 | 26 | 110 |
| 9 | Canada | 27 | 36 | 39 | | 102 |
| 10 | Russia | 23 | 13 | 47 | 15 | 98 |

== Results ==
=== Men ===
| Event | Winner | Second | Third |
Australia, Melbourne — 2–4 December 2010
| Sprint | Shane Perkins (AUS) | Jason Kenny (GBR) | Teun Mulder (NED) |
| Team pursuit | Australia; Jack Bobridge; Michael Hepburn; Leigh Howard; Cameron Meyer; 4:56.913 | Russia; Alexander Khatuntsev; Evgeny Kovalev; Alexei Markov; Alexander Serov; 4:02.354 | Great Britain; Ed Clancy; Steven Burke; Luke Rowe; Andrew Tennant; 4:01.456 |
| Team sprint | Great Britain; Jason Kenny; Matthew Crampton; Chris Hoy; 43.829 | New Zealand; Edward Dawkins; Ethan Mitchell; Sam Webster; 44.339 | Australia (Team Jayco–AIS); Daniel Ellis; Jason Niblett; Shane Perkins; 44.545 |
| Keirin | Chris Hoy (GBR) | Teun Mulder (GER) | Mickaël Bourgain (FRA) |
| Omnium | Shane Archbold (NZL); 24 pts | Zachary Bell (CAN); 31 pts | Ed Clancy (GBR); 35 pts |
| Madison | Australia; Cameron Meyer; Leigh Howard; 10 pts | New Zealand; Aaron Gate; Myron Simpson; 14 pts, -1 lap | Netherlands; Nick Stopler; Peter Schep; 10 pts, -1 lap |
Colombia, Cali — 16–18 December 2010
| Sprint | Kévin Sireau (FRA) | Chris Hoy (GBR) | Teun Mulder (GER) |
| Team pursuit | New Zealand; Sam Bewley; Westley Gough; Marc Ryan; Jesse Sergent; 4:00.637 | Colombia; Juan Esteban Arango; Edwin Ávila; Arles Castro; Weimar Roldán; 4:07.408 | Spain; Pablo Aitor Bernal; Sergi Escobar; David Muntaner; Eloy Teruel Rovira; 4:07.439 |
| Team sprint | France; Grégory Baugé; Michaël D'Almeida; Kévin Sireau; 43.539 | Great Britain; Matthew Crampton; Chris Hoy; Jason Kenny; 43.830 | New Zealand; Edward Dawkins; Ethan Mitchell; Sam Webster; 44.118 |
| Keirin | Azizulhasni Awang (MYS) (YSD Track Team) | François Pervis (FRA) (Cofidis) | Denis Špička (CZE) |
| Scratch race | Morgan Kneisky (FRA) | Gijs van Hoecke (BEL) | Martin Bláha (CZE) |
| Omnium | Ed Clancy (GBR); 24 pts | Juan Esteban Arango (COL); 26 pts | Zachary Bell (CAN); 27 pts |
China, Beijing — 21–23 January 2011
| Sprint | Kévin Sireau (FRA) | Sebastian Doehrer (GER) | Zhang Miao (CHN) |
| 1 km time trial | François Pervis (FRA) | Hugo Haak (NED) | Simon Van Velthooven (NZL) |
| Team pursuit | Russia; Alexander Khatuntsev; Evgeny Kovalev; Alexei Markov; Alexander Serov caught opponents | Spain; Sergi Escobar; Asier Maeztu; Antonio Miguel Parra; Albert Torres caught | Great Britain; Mark Christian; Andrew Fenn; Erick Rowsell; Simon Yates; 4:05.010 |
| Team sprint | France; Michaël D'Almeida; François Pervis; Kévin Sireau; 44.150 | Russia; Denis Dmitriev; Pavel Yakushevskiy; Sergey Kucherov; 44.664 | China; Zhang Miao; Zhang Lei; Cheng Changsong; 44.716 |
| Keirin | Simon van Velthooven (NZL) | Scott Sunderland (AUS) | Asai Kota (JPN) (Cyclo Channel Tokyo) |
| Points race | Artur Ershov (RUS) (Lokomotiv); 35 pts | Alexei Markov (RUS); 30 pts | Claudio Imhof (SUI); 23 pts |
| Omnium | Sam Harrison (GBR); 28 pts | Zachary Bell (CAN); 30 pts | Roger Kluge (GER); 32 pts |
United Kingdom, Manchester — 18–20 February 2011
| Sprint | Kévin Sireau (FRA) | Jason Kenny (GBR) (Sky Track Cycling) | Chris Hoy (GBR) (Sky Track Cycling) |
| Individual pursuit | Rohan Dennis (AUS); 4:15.614 | Geraint Thomas (GBR); 4:16.477 | Marc Ryan (NZL); 4:24.855 |
| Team pursuit | Great Britain; Steven Burke; Ed Clancy; Geraint Thomas; Bradley Wiggins; 3:55.438 | New Zealand; Aaron Gate; Westley Gough; Peter Latham; Marc Ryan; 4:00.314 | Spain; Pablo Bernal; Asier Maeztu; David Muntaner; Eloy Teruel; 4:03.308 |
| Team sprint | France; Grégory Baugé; Kévin Sireau; Michaël D'Almeida; 43.534 | Germany; René Enders; Maximilian Levy; Stefan Nimke; 43.715 | Great Britain (Sky Track Cycling); Jason Kenny; Chris Hoy; Matthew Crampton; 44.087 |
| Keirin | Chris Hoy (GBR) (Sky Track Cycling) | Jason Niblett (AUS) (Team Jayco–AIS) | Azizulhasni Awang (MYS) (YSD Track Team) |
| Omnium | Shane Archbold (NZL); 15 pts | Cho Ho-sung (KOR); 31 pts | Elia Viviani (ITA); 36 pts |

=== Women ===
| Event | Winner | Second | Third |
Australia, Melbourne — 2–4 December 2010
| Sprint | Anna Meares (AUS) | Victoria Pendleton (GBR) | Kristina Vogel (GER) |
| 500m time trial | Anna Meares (AUS); 33.593 | Sandie Clair (FRA); 33.667 | Lee Wai Sze (CHN); 33.939 |
| Team pursuit | Australia; Katherine Bates; Sarah Kent; Josephine Tomic; 3:22.171 | Germany; Charlotte Becker; Lisa Brennauer; Madeleine Sandig; 3:23.166 | New Zealand; Kaytee Boyd; Lauren Ellis; Jaime Nielsen; 3:23.477 |
| Team sprint | China; Gong Jinjie; Guo Shuang; 33.240 | Great Britain; Victoria Pendleton; Jess Varnish; 33.562 | France; Sandie Clair; Clara Sanchez; 33.655 |
| Keirin | Anna Meares (AUS) | Karlee McCulloch (AUS) (Team Jayco–AIS) | Clara Sanchez (FRA) |
| Omnium | Leire Olaberria (ESP); 26 pts | Tara Whitten (CAN); 31 pts | Małgorzata Wojtyra (POL); 40 pts |
Colombia, Cali — 16–18 December 2010
| Sprint | Kristina Vogel (GER) | Victoria Pendleton (GBR) | Sandie Clair (FRA) |
| Individual pursuit | Alison Shanks (NZL); 3:30.258 | Wendy Houvenaghel (GBR); 3:34.794 | Pascale Schnider (SUI); 3:38.403 |
| Team pursuit | New Zealand; Rushlee Buchanan; Lauren Ellis; Alison Shanks; 3:22.202 | United States (OUCH Pro Cycling); Dotsie Bausch; Sarah Hammer; Lauren Tamayo; 3:25.222 | Great Britain; Katie Colclough; Wendy Houvenaghel; Laura Trott; 3:23.789 |
| Team sprint | Great Britain; Victoria Pendleton; Jess Varnish; 33.322 | Germany; Kristina Vogel; Miriam Welte; 33.625 | France; Sandie Clair; Virginie Cueff; 33.756 |
| Keirin | Victoria Pendleton (GBR) | Sandie Clair (FRA) | Virginie Cueff (FRA) |
| Points race | Giorgia Bronzini (ITA); 13 pts | Kelly Druyts (BEL); 10 pts | Aksana Papko (BLR); 10 pts |
| Omnium | Sarah Hammer (USA) (OUCH Pro Cycling); 15 pts | Tara Whitten (CAN); 30 pts | Tatsiana Sharakova (BLR); 31 pts |
China, Beijing — 21–23 January 2011
| Sprint | Lyubov Shulika (UKR) | Simona Krupeckaitė (LTU) | Junhong Lin (CHN) |
| Team pursuit | New Zealand; Kaytee Boyd; Rushlee Buchanan; Jaime Nielsen; 3:25.062 | Canada; Tara Whitten; Laura Brown; Stephanie Roorda; 3:27.238 | Australia; Melissa Hoskins; Ashlee Ankudinoff; Sarah Kent; 3:26.515 |
| Team sprint | China; Junhong Lin; Gong Jinjie; 33.295 | Netherlands; Willy Kanis; Yvonne Hijgenaar; 33.996 | Lithuania; Simona Krupeckaitė; Gintarė Gaivenytė; 34.296 |
| Keirin | Clara Sanchez (FRA) | Lyubov Shulika (UKR) | Becky James (GBR) |
| Omnium | Tara Whitten (CAN); 24 pts | Kirsten Wild (NED); 37 pts | Pascale Jeuland (FRA); 38 pts |
United Kingdom, Manchester — 18–20 February 2011
| Sprint | Anna Meares (AUS) | Guo Shuang (CHN) | Victoria Pendleton (GBR) |
| Team Pursuit | Great Britain; Wendy Houvenaghel; Joanna Rowsell; Sarah Storey; 3:19.757 | New Zealand; Lauren Ellis; Jaime Nielsen; Alison Shanks; 3:20.828 | United States (OUCH Pro Cycling); Sarah Hammer; Dotsie Bausch; Jennie Reed; 3:23.136 |
| Team sprint | Australia; Anna Meares; Kaarle McCulloch; 33.017 | China; Gong Jinjie; Guo Shuang; 33.173 | France; Sandie Clair; Clara Sanchez; 33.347 |
| Keirin | Guo Shuang (CHN) | Clara Sanchez (FRA) | Victoria Pendleton (GBR) |
| Scratch race | Anastasia Chulkova (RUS) | Jennie Reed (USA) (OUCH Pro Cycling) | Amy Cure (AUS) |
| Omnium | Sarah Hammer (USA) (OUCH Pro Cycling); 9 pts | Kirsten Wild (NED); 38 pts | Małgorzata Wojtyra (POL); 42 pts |

== See also ==
- 2010–11 UCI Track Cycling World Ranking
