= 2009–10 UCI Track Cycling World Cup Classics =

International track cycling competition

- Eighteenth edition of the UCI Track Cycling World Cup Classics

Details
- Dates: 30 October 2009 – 24 January 2010
- Location: United Kingdom, Australia, Colombia and China
- Races: 4

The 2009–10 UCI Track Cycling World Cup Classics is a multi race tournament over a season of track cycling. The season ran from 30 October 2009 to 24 January 2010. The World Cup was organised by the Union Cycliste Internationale.

The World Cup kicked off in Manchester, Great Britain, then moved to Melbourne, Australia, from 19 to 21 November.

As in the previous season, there were also rounds at the Alcides Nieto Patiño Velodrome in Cali, Colombia, from 10 to 11 December 2009, and in Beijing, China, from 22 to 24 January 2010.

Unlike previous year, there was no World Cup event in Copenhagen, Denmark, but that was the venue for the 2010 UCI Track Cycling World Championships, which took place from 24 to 28 March.

== Overall team standings ==
Overall team standings are calculated based on total number of points gained by the team's riders in each event. The top ten teams after round 4 are listed below:

Rank	Team	Round 1	Round 2	Round 3	Round 4	Total points
1	Germany	96	93	100	53	342
2	Australia	86	124	16	99	325
3	Netherlands	73	58	37	57	225
4	Great Britain	129	70	13	11	223
5	China	41	62	0	105	208
6	New Zealand	1	93	6	83	183
7	France	23	29	55	53	160
8	Lithuania	40	5	78	17	140
9	Ukraine	27	42	38	25	132
10	Team Jayco	23	69	0	34	126

== Results ==
=== Men ===
Event	Winner	Second	Third
United Kingdom, Manchester — 30 October – 1 November 2009
Kilo	Stefan Nimke (GER)	David Daniell (GBR)	Wang Chongyang (CHN)
Keirin	Chris Hoy (GBR) (Team Sky+ HD)	Christos Volikakis (GRE)	Maximilian Levy (GER)
Individual pursuit	Geraint Thomas (GBR)	Dominique Cornu (BEL)	Vitaliy Shchedov (UKR)
Team pursuit	Great Britain; Steven Burke; Ed Clancy; Andy Tennant; Geraint Thomas	Spain; Sergi Escobar; David Muntaner; Antonio Tauler; Eloy Teruel	Ukraine; Maksym Fonrabe; Maksym Polishchuk; Vitaliy Shchedov; Roman Kononenko
Sprint	Chris Hoy (GBR) (Team Sky+ HD)	Matt Crampton (GBR)	Jason Kenny (GBR)
Points race	Chris Newton (GBR)	Ho Ting Kwok (HKG) (Hong Kong Pro Cycling)	Roger Kluge (GER)
Scratch race	Ivan Kovalev (RUS)	Łukasz Bujko (POL)	Sergiy Lagkuti (UKR)
Madison	Belgium; Kenny De Ketele; Tim Mertens	Germany; Roger Kluge; Robert Bartko	Russia; Sergey Kolesnikov; Alexey Shmidt
Team sprint	Team Sky+ HD; Ross Edgar; Chris Hoy; Jamie Staff	Great Britain; Matthew Crampton; David Daniell; Jason Kenny	Germany; Robert Förstemann; Stefan Nimke; Tobias Wachter
Australia, Melbourne — 19–21 November 2009
Kilo	Scott Sunderland (AUS) (Team Jayco)	Wang Chongyang (CHN)	Teun Mulder (NED) (Cofidis)
Keirin	Carsten Bergemann (GER)	Azizulhasni Awang (MAS) (Bike Technologies Australia)	Josiah Ng (MAS)
Individual pursuit	Jesse Sergent (NZL)	Rohan Dennis (AUS)	Vitaliy Shchedov (UKR)
Team pursuit	Australia; Rohan Dennis; Luke Durbridge; Michael Hepburn; Cameron Meyer	Great Britain; Steven Burke; Ed Clancy; Andrew Fenn; Andy Tennant	New Zealand; Sam Bewley; Peter Latham; Marc Ryan; Jesse Sergent
Sprint	Shane Perkins (AUS) (Team Jayco)	Kévin Sireau (FRA) (Cofidis)	Matt Crampton (GBR)
Points race	Cameron Meyer (AUS)	Ioannis Tamouridis (GRE)	Łukasz Bujko (POL)
Scratch race	Thomas Scully (NZL)	Łukasz Bujko (POL)	Viktor Shmalko (RUS) (Katyusha Continental Team)
Madison	New Zealand; Marc Ryan; Thomas Scully	Germany; Robert Bengsch; Marcel Kalz	Ukraine; Sergiy Lagkuti; Mykhaylo Radionov
Team sprint	Team Jayco; Daniel Ellis; Shane Perkins; Scott Sunderland	Germany; Carsten Bergemann; René Enders; Tobias Wachter	Russia; Sergey Borisov; Denis Dmitriev; Sergey Kucherov
Colombia, Cali — 10–12 December 2009
Kilo	Michaël D'Almeida (FRA)	François Pervis (FRA) (Cofidis)	Yevhen Bolibrukh (UKR)
Keirin	Michaël D'Almeida (FRA)	Teun Mulder (NED) (Cofidis)	Andrii Vynokurov (UKR)
Individual pursuit	Vitaly Popkov (UKR)	Juan Esteban Arango (COL)	Gediminas Bagdonas (LTU)
Team pursuit	Colombia; Juan Esteban Arango; Arles Castro; Edwin Ávila; Weimar Roldán	Lokomotiv; Artur Ershov; Valery Kaikov; Evgeny Shalunov; Kirill Sveshnikov	Spain; Pablo Aitor Bernal; Ramon Domene; Sergi Escobar; Luis Mas
Sprint	Kévin Sireau (FRA) (Cofidis)	Robert Förstemann (GER)	Maximilian Levy (GER)
Points race	Ioannis Tamouridis (GRE)	Iljo Keisse (BEL)	Marcel Barth (GER)
Scratch race	Ángel Colla (ARG)	Erik Mohs (GER)	Leonardo Duque (COL) (Cofidis)
Madison	Germany; Marcel Barth; Erik Mohs	Lokomotiv; Artur Ershov; Valery Kaikov	Colombia; Carlos Ospina; Carlos Urán
Team sprint	Cofidis; Teun Mulder; François Pervis; Kévin Sireau	Germany; Robert Förstemann; Maximilian Levy; Mathias Stumpf	Ukraine; Yevhen Bolikrukh; Yuriy Tsyupyk; Andrii Vynokurov
China, Beijing — 22–24 January 2010
Kilo	Zhang Miao (CHN)	Joachim Eilers (GER)	Kamil Kuczyński (POL)
Keirin	Azizulhasni Awang (MAS) (Bike Technologies Australia)	Jason Niblett (AUS)	Dan Ellis (AUS) (Team Jayco)
Individual pursuit	Vitaliy Shchedov (UKR)	Michael Hepburn (AUS)	Valery Kaikov (RUS) (Lokomotiv)
Team pursuit	Australia; Luke Durbridge; Michael Hepburn; Leigh Howard; Travis Meyer	Netherlands; Levi Heimans; Arno van der Zwet; Tim Veldt; Sipke Zijlstra	New Zealand; Shane Archbold; Aaron Gate; Thomas Scully; Myron Simpson
Sprint	Edward Dawkins (NZL)	Michaël D'Almeida (FRA)	François Pervis (FRA) (Cofidis)
Points race	Zachary Bell (CAN)	Kwok Ho Ting (HKG) (Hong Kong Pro Cycling)	Thomas Scully (NZL)
Scratch race	Zachary Bell (CAN)	Hayden Godfrey (NZL)	Werner Riebenbauer (AUT)
Madison	Hong Kong Pro Cycling; Kwok Ho Ting; Choi Ki Ho	Italy; Elia Viviani; Angelo Ciccone	New Zealand; Myron Simpson; Thomas Scully
Team sprint	China; Cheng Changsong; Zhang Lei; Zhang Miao	Team Jayco; Dan Ellis; Shane Perkins; Scott Sunderland	France; Grégory Baugé; Michaël D'Almeida; Thierry Jollet
Final standings
Kilo	Wang Chongyang (CHN)	Scott Sunderland (AUS) (Team Jayco)	David Daniell (GBR)
Keirin	Azizulhasni Awang (MAS) (Bike Technologies Australia)	Maximilian Levy (GER)	Jason Niblett (AUS) (Team Jayco)
Individual pursuit	Vitaliy Shchedov (UKR)	Valery Kaikov (RUS) (Lokomotiv)	Vitaliy Popkov (UKR)
Team pursuit	Great Britain	Australia	Spain
Sprint	Kévin Sireau (FRA) (Cofidis)	Shane Perkins (AUS)	Matthew Crampton (GBR)
Points race	Ioannis Tamouridis (GRE)	Kwok Ho Ting (HKG) (Hong Kong Pro Cycling)	Zachary Bell (CAN)
Scratch race	Łukasz Bujko (POL)	Zachary Bell (CAN)	Ángel Colla (ARG)
Madison	Germany	New Zealand	Belgium
Team sprint	Germany	Team Jayco	Cofidis

=== Women ===
Event	Winner	Second	Third
United Kingdom, Manchester — 30 October – 1 November 2009
500m time trial	Anna Meares (AUS)	Victoria Pendleton (GBR) (Team Sky+ HD)	Willy Kanis (NED)
Keirin	Simona Krupeckaitė (LTU)	Guo Shuang (CHN)	Anna Meares (AUS)
Individual pursuit	Wendy Houvenaghel (GBR)	Josephine Tomic (AUS)	Vera Koedooder (NED)
Team pursuit	Great Britain; Lizzie Armitstead; Wendy Houvenaghel; Joanna Rowsell	Germany; Lisa Brennauer; Verena Joos; Madeleine Sandig	Australia; Tess Downing; Belinda Goss; Josephine Tomic
Sprint	Victoria Pendleton (GBR) (Team Sky+ HD)	Guo Shuang (CHN)	Simona Krupeckaitė (LTU)
Points race	Lizzie Armitstead (GBR)	Yumari González (CUB)	Evgenia Romanyuta (RUS)
Scratch race	Belinda Goss (AUS)	Evgenia Romanyuta (RUS)	Shelley Olds (USA) (Proman Racing Team)
Team sprint	Australia; Kaarle McCulloch; Anna Meares	Netherlands; Yvonne Hijgenaar; Willy Kanis	Germany; Dana Glöss; Miriam Welte
Australia, Melbourne — 19–21 November 2009
500m time trial	Anna Meares (AUS)	Kaarle McCulloch (AUS) (Team Jayco)	Sandie Clair (FRA)
Keirin	Anna Meares (AUS)	Guo Shuang (CHN)	Christin Muche (GER)
Individual pursuit	Wendy Houvenaghel (GBR)	Alison Shanks (NZL)	Lesya Kalytovska (UKR)
Team pursuit	New Zealand; Kaytee Boyd; Lauren Ellis; Alison Shanks	Great Britain; Katie Colclough; Wendy Houvenaghel; Joanna Rowsell	Australia; Ashlee Ankudinoff; Sarah Kent; Josephine Tomic
Sprint	Anna Meares (AUS)	Guo Shuang (CHN)	Willy Kanis (NED)
Points race	Giorgia Bronzini (ITA)	Shelley Olds (USA)	Madeleine Sandig (GER)
Scratch race	Evgenia Romanyuta (RUS)	Giorgia Bronzini (ITA)	Theresa Cliff-Ryan (USA) (Verducci Breakaway Racing)
Team sprint	China; Gong Jinjie; Junhong Lin	Netherlands; Yvonne Hijgenaar; Willy Kanis	Australia; Emily Rosemond; Anna Meares
Colombia, Cali — 10–12 December 2009
500m time trial	Simona Krupeckaitė (LTU)	Willy Kanis (NED)	Lisandra Guerra (CUB)
Keirin	Christin Muche (GER)	Emily Rosemond (AUS)	Diana García (COL)
Individual pursuit	Sarah Hammer (USA)	Tara Whitten (CAN)	Vilija Sereikaitė (LTU)
Team pursuit	Canada; Laura Brown; Stephanie Roorda; Tara Whitten	United States; Dotsie Bausch; Sarah Hammer; Lauren Tamayo	Lithuania; Vaida Pikauskaitė; Vilija Sereikaitė; Aušrinė Trebaitė
Sprint	Simona Krupeckaitė (LTU)	Willy Kanis (NED)	Lisandra Guerra (CUB)
Points race	Giorgia Bronzini (ITA)	Tara Whitten (CAN)	Charlotte Becker (GER)
Scratch race	Tatsiana Sharakova (BLR)	Giorgia Bronzini (ITA)	Yumari González (CUB)
Team sprint	Netherlands; Yvonne Hijgenaar; Willy Kanis	Lithuania; Gintarė Gaivenytė; Simona Krupeckaitė	Russia; Victoria Baranova; Olga Streltsova
China, Beijing — 22–24 January 2010
500m time trial	Willy Kanis (NED)	Gong Jinjie (CHN)	Anna Meares (AUS)
Keirin	Guo Shuang (CHN)	Miriam Welte (GER)	Lee Wai Sze (HKG)
Individual pursuit	Alison Shanks (NZL)	Vilija Sereikaitė (LTU)	Tara Whitten (CAN)
Team pursuit	Australia; Ashlee Ankudinoff; Sarah Kent; Josephine Tomic	New Zealand; Lauren Ellis; Jaime Nielsen; Alison Shanks	Canada; Laura Brown; Stephanie Roorda; Tara Whitten
Sprint	Guo Shuang (CHN)	Anna Meares (AUS)	Lin Junhong (CHN)
Points race	Megan Dunn (AUS)	Elena Tchalykh (AZE)	Giorgia Bronzini (ITA)
Scratch race	Vera Koedooder (NED)	Aušrinė Trebaitė (LTU)	Evgenia Romanyuta (RUS)
Team sprint	China; Gong Jinjie; Lin Junhong	Netherlands; Yvonne Hijgenaar; Willy Kanis	Australia; Anna Meares; Emily Rosemond
Final standings
500m time trial	Anna Meares (AUS)	Willy Kanis (NED)	Simona Krupeckaitė (LTU)
Keirin	Guo Shuang (CHN)	Christin Muche (GER)	Anna Meares (AUS)
Individual pursuit	Wendy Houvenaghel (GBR)	Alison Shanks (NZL)	Vilija Sereikaitė (LTU)
Team pursuit	Australia	New Zealand	Great Britain
Sprint	Guo Shuang (CHN)	Anna Meares (AUS)	Willy Kanis (NED)
Points race	Giorgia Bronzini (ITA)	Tatsiana Sharakova (BLR)	Yumari González (CUB)
Scratch race	Evgenia Romanyuta (RUS)	Giorgia Bronzini (ITA)	Vera Koedooder (NED)
Team sprint	Netherlands	Australia	China

== See also ==
- 2009–10 UCI Track Cycling World Ranking
