= 2008–09 UCI Track Cycling World Cup Classics =

International track cycling competition

2008–2009 UCI Track Cycling World Cup Classics
- Seventeenth edition of the UCI Track Cycling World Cup Classics

Details
- Dates: 31 October 2008 – 18 February 2009
- Location: United Kingdom, Australia, Colombia, China and Denmark
- Races: 5

The 2008–2009 UCI Track Cycling World Cup Classics was a multi race competition over a season of track cycling. The season ran from 31 October 2008 to 18 February 2009. The World Cup is organised by the Union Cycliste Internationale.

The World Cup kicked off in Manchester, Great Britain on 31 October 2008. Although many of the top riders did not participate in this round, as they were still recovering from the 2008 Summer Olympics, this gave many less experienced riders an opportunity to make their mark in the competition.

171 riders were on the start list for the second round in Melbourne, Australia, held from 20 to 22 November 2008. New talent was prevalent once more, demonstrated by Cyclingnews' statistics which showed that 100 of those riders were under the age of 23 and only 12 were over 30.

The third round was held at the newly renovated Alcides Nieto Patiño Velodrome in Cali, Colombia from 12 to 14 December 2008. 166 athletes competed in this round, representing 30 different countries.

For the fourth round, held from 16 to 18 January 2009, riders returned to the Beijing velodrome in China for the first time since the 2008 Summer Olympics. Temperatures in the velodrome were much lower than the sweltering heat experienced by the riders during the summer, this time it was approximately 16 degrees indoors.

The fifth and final round was held in Copenhagen, Denmark from 13 to 15 February 2009. British paralympic rider Darren Kenny also made an appearance at Copenhagen, a world record attempt had been scheduled during the World Cup, on 14 February. Kenny intended to attempt to break his own CP 3 World Hour Record of 41.817 km which was set in Manchester on 8 January 2005.

As the five rounds of the World Cup were held scattered around the world, only a few riders were able to participate in every round. Those who attended the first two rounds were able to rise to the top of the overall series standings, this led to many unfamiliar names appearing at the top of the rankings.

== Overall team standings ==
Overall team standings are calculated based on total number of points gained by the team's riders in each event. With one round remaining, 60 teams have so far participated in the 2008–2009 UCI Track Cycling World Cup Classics. The top ten teams are listed below:

Rank	Team	Round 1	Round 2	Round 3	Round 4	Round 5	Total Points
1	Germany	92	56	62	52	74	336
2	Netherlands	41	60	17	72	99	289
3	Great Britain	133	36	15	32	57	273
4	France	24	25	65	64	71	249
5	Spain	49	66	78	17	31	241
6	China	41	38	23	108	31	241
7	Southaustralia.com–AIS	12	98	38	29	35	212
8	Russia	45	55	51	37	11	199
9	Ukraine	51	67	22	30	24	194
10	Cofidis	25	26	51	26	44	172

== Results ==
=== Men ===
Event	Winner	Second	Third
United Kingdom, Manchester — 31 October–2 November 2008
kilo	David Daniell (GBR)	Yevhen Bolibrukh (UKR)	Kamil Kuczyński (POL)
keirin	François Pervis (FRA) (Cofidis)	Jason Kenny (GBR) (Team Sky+ HD)	Teun Mulder (NED)
individual pursuit	Ed Clancy (GBR)	Vitaliy Shchedov (UKR)	Valery Kaykov (RUS) (Lokomotiv)
team pursuit	Great Britain; Steven Burke; Ed Clancy; Geraint Thomas; Rob Hayles	Denmark; Michael Færk Christensen; Casper Jørgensen; Daniel Kreutzfeldt; Jens-Erik Madsen	Netherlands; Ismaël Kip; Peter Schep; Wim Stroetinga; Arno van der Zwet
sprint	Jason Kenny (GBR) (Team Sky+ HD)	Shane Perkins (AUS)	Matthew Crampton (GBR)
points race	Chris Newton (GBR)	Eloy Teruel Rovira (ESP)	Iljo Keisse (BEL)
scratch race	Wim Stroetinga (NED)	Tim Mertens (BEL)	Martin Bláha (CZE) (ASC Dukla Praha)
madison	Germany; Olaf Pollack; Roger Kluge	Belgium; Kenny de Ketele; Iljo Keisse	Russia; Ivan Kovalev; Sergey Kolesnikov
team sprint	Team Sky+ HD; Ross Edgar; Jason Kenny; Jamie Staff	Poland; Łukasz Kwiatkowski; Kamil Kuczyński; Maciej Bielecki	Germany; Sebastian Doehrer; René Enders; Mathias Stumpf
Australia, Melbourne — 20–22 November 2008
kilo	Michaël D'Almeida (FRA)	Scott Sunderland (AUS) (Southaustralia.com–AIS)	Wen Hao (CHN)
keirin	Azizulhasni Awang (MAS)	Andriy Vynokurov (UKR)	François Pervis (FRA)
individual pursuit	Jack Bobridge (AUS)	Alexei Markov (RUS)	Vitaliy Shchedov (UKR)
team pursuit	Australia; Jack Bobridge; Rohan Dennis; Luke Durbridge; Mark Jamieson	Spain; Unai Elorriaga Zubiaur; David Muntaner Juaneda; Toni Tauler Llull; Eloy Teruel Rovira	Ukraine; Roman Kononenko; Sergiy Lagkuti; Lyubomyr Polatayko; Vitaliy Schedov
sprint	Shane Perkins (AUS)	Michaël D'Almeida (FRA)	Jason Niblett (AUS) (Southaustralia.com–AIS)
points race	Glenn O'Shea (AUS) (Southaustralia.com–AIS)	Seo Joon Yong (KOR)	Eloy Teruel Rovira (ESP)
scratch race	Kwok Ho Ting (HKG)	Leigh Howard (AUS) (Southaustralia.com–AIS)	Jason Christie (NZL)
madison	Spain; Unai Elorriaga Zubiaur; David Muntaner Juaneda	Australia; Cameron Meyer; Chris Sutton	Germany; Henning Bommel; Fabian Schaar
team sprint	Southaustralia.com–AIS; Daniel Ellis; Jason Niblett; Scott Sunderland	Japan; Narita Kazuya; Nitta Yudai; Watanabe Kazunari	Ukraine; Yevhen Bolibrukh; Yuriy Tsylipyk; Andriy Vynokurov
Colombia, Cali — 12–14 December 2008
kilo	Stefan Nimke (GER)	Yevhen Bolibrukh (UKR)	Li Wenhao (CHN)
keirin	Leonardo Narváez (COL)	Jason Niblett (AUS) (Southaustralia.com–AIS)	Barry Forde (BAR)
individual pursuit	Sergi Escobar Roure (ESP)	Valery Kaykov (RUS)	Arles Castro (COL)
team pursuit	Russia; Artur Ershov; Valery Kaykov; Leonid Krasnov; Vladimir Shchekunov	Spain; Sergi Escobar Roure; Asier Maeztu Billelabaitia; Antonio Miguel Parra; Carlos Torrent Tarres	Colombia; Juan Esteban Arango; Arles Castro; Edwin Ávila; Alexander González
sprint	Kévin Sireau (FRA) (Cofidis)	Stefan Nimke (GER)	Mickaël Bourgain (FRA) (Cofidis)
points race	Leonardo Duque (COL)	Peter Kennaugh (GBR)	Carlos Torrent Tarres (ESP)
scratch race	Zachary Bell (CAN)	Tim Mertens (BEL)	Carlos Torrent Tarres (ESP)
madison	Belgium; Ingmar de Poortere; Tim Mertens	Colombia; Juan Esteban Arango; Carlos Urán	Russia; Artur Ershov; Valery Kaykov
team sprint	Germany; Carsten Bergemann; Robert Förstemann; Stefan Nimke	Southaustralia.com–AIS; Daniel Ellis; Jason Niblett; Scott Sunderland	Cofidis; Mickaël Bourgain; Didier Henriette; Kévin Sireau
China, Beijing — 16–18 January 2009
kilo	(Malaysia) Mohd Rizal Tisin	François Pervis (FRA)	Kamil Kuczyński (POL)
keirin	(Malaysia) Azizul Hasni Awang (Bike Technologies Australia)	Grégory Baugé (FRA)	Teun Mulder (NED)
individual pursuit	Jesse Sergent (NZL)	Vitaliy Shchedov (UKR)	David O'Loughlin (IRL)
team pursuit	Southaustralia.com–AIS; Leigh Howard; Glenn O'Shea; Rohan Dennis; Mark Jamieson	New Zealand; Sam Bewley; Peter Latham; Marc Ryan; Jesse Sergent	Lokomotiv; Artur Ershov; Valery Kaykov; Leonid Krasnov; Vladimir Shchekunov
sprint	Grégory Baugé (FRA)	Zhang Lei (CHN)	Shane Perkins (AUS)
points race	Chris Newton (GBR)	Zachary Bell (CAN)	Rafał Ratajczyk (POL)
scratch race	Hayden Godfrey (NZL)	Chris Newton (GBR)	Rafał Ratajczyk (POL)
madison	Southaustralia.com–AIS; Glenn O'Shea; Leigh Howard	Great Britain; Rob Hayles; Peter Kennaugh	Germany; Roger Kluge; Ralf Matzka
team sprint	Cofidis; Mickaël Bourgain; Kévin Sireau; François Pervis	France; Grégory Baugé; Michaël D'Almeida; Thierry Jollet	Germany; Sebastian Doehrer; Maximilian Levy; Mathias Stumpf
Denmark, Copenhagen — 13–15 February 2009
kilo	Taylor Phinney (USA)	Michaël D'Almeida (FRA) (US Créteil)	Quentin Lafargue (FRA)
keirin	Kévin Sireau (FRA) (Cofidis)	Hodei Mazquiarán Uría (ESP)	Andrii Vynokurov (UKR)
individual pursuit	Taylor Phinney (USA)	David O'Loughlin (IRL)	Alexei Markov (RUS)
team pursuit	Great Britain; Steven Burke; Ed Clancy; Peter Kennaugh; Chris Newton	Spain; Unai Elorriaga Zubiaur; Sergi Escobar Roure; David Muntaner Juaneda; Eloy Teruel Rovira	Denmark; Niki Byrgesen; Michael Færk Christensen; Daniel Kreutzfeldt; Jens-Erik Madsen
sprint	Grégory Baugé (FRA) (US Créteil)	Mickaël Bourgain (FRA) (Cofidis)	Kévin Sireau (FRA) (Cofidis)
points race	Wong Kam-po (HKG)	Marcel Barth (GER)	Milan Kadlec (CZE)
scratch race	Kazuhiro Mori (JPN)	Franco Marvulli (SUI)	Daniel Holloway (USA)
madison	Germany; Marcel Barth; Robert Bartko	Italy; Elia Viviani; Angelo Ciccone	Netherlands; Peter Schep; Pim Ligthart
team sprint	Team Sky+ HD; Chris Hoy; Jason Kenny; Jamie Staff	Cofidis; Mickaël Bourgain; François Pervis; Kévin Sireau	US Créteil; Grégory Baugé; Michaël D'Almeida; Thierry Jollet

=== Women ===
Event	Winner	Second	Third
United Kingdom, Manchester — 31 October–2 November 2008
500m time trial	Victoria Pendleton (GBR) (Team Sky+ HD)	Gong Jinjie (CHN)	Miriam Welte (GER)
keirin	Victoria Pendleton (GBR) (Team Sky+ HD)	Diana García (COL)	Gong Jinjie (CHN)
individual pursuit	Wendy Houvenaghel (GBR)	Tara Whitten (CAN)	Joanna Rowsell (GBR) (Team 100% ME)
team pursuit	Team 100% ME; Elizabeth Armitstead; Katie Colclough; Joanna Rowsell	Germany; Charlotte Becker; Christina Becker; Lisa Brennauer	Ukraine; Svitlana Halyuk; Lesya Kalytovska; Lyubov Shulika
sprint	Victoria Pendleton (GBR) (Team Sky+ HD)	Zheng Lulu (CHN)	Lyubov Shulika (UKR)
points race	Elizabeth Armitstead (GBR) (Team 100% ME)	Lucy Martin (GBR)	Katie Colclough (GBR) (Team 100% ME)
scratch race	Elizabeth Armitstead (GBR) (Team 100% ME)	Tara Whitten (CAN)	Alex Greenfield (GBR)
team sprint	Great Britain; Anna Blyth; Jessica Varnish	Germany; Christin Muche; Miriam Welte	Russia; Victoria Baranova; Swetlana Grankowskaja
Australia, Melbourne — 20–22 November 2008
500m time trial	Willy Kanis (NED)	Gong Jinjie (CHN)	Kaarle McCulloch (AUS) (Southaustralia.com–AIS)
keirin	Willy Kanis (NED)	Elisa Frisoni (ITA)	Christin Muche (GER)
individual pursuit	Joanna Rowsell (GBR)	Josephine Tomic (AUS)	Lada Kozlíková (CZE)
team pursuit	Great Britain; Elizabeth Armitstead; Katie Colclough; Joanna Rowsell	Australia; Ashlee Ankudinoff; Sarah Kent; Josephine Tomic	Ukraine; Svitlana Halyuk; Lesya Kalytovska; Lyubov Shulika
sprint	Lyubov Shulika (UKR)	Christin Muche (GER)	Kerrie Meares (AUS)
points race	Evgenia Romanyuta (RUS)	Leire Olaberria (ESP)	Belinda Goss (AUS) (Southaustralia.com–AIS)
scratch race	Elizabeth Armitstead (GBR)	Annalisa Cucinotta (ITA)	Evgenia Romanyuta (RUS)
team sprint	Netherlands; Yvonne Hijgenaar; Willy Kanis	Australia; Kerrie Meares; Emily Rosemond	South Korea; Gu Hyon Jin; Kim Won Gyeong
Colombia, Cali — 12–14 December 2008
500m time trial	Simona Krupeckaitė (LTU)	Lisandra Guerra Rodriguez (CUB)	Sandie Clair (FRA)
keirin	Simona Krupeckaitė (LTU)	Clara Sanchez (FRA)	Lisandra Guerra Rodriguez (CUB)
individual pursuit	Vilija Sereikaitė (LTU)	María Luisa Calle (COL)	Tara Whitten (CAN)
team pursuit	Cuba; Dalilia Rodriguez; Yudelmis Domínguez; Yumari González	Colombia; Elizabeth Agudelo; Andrea Botero Coy; María Luisa Calle	Italy; Giorgia Bronzini; Annalisa Cucinotta; Marta Tagliaferro
sprint	Simona Krupeckaitė (LTU)	Clara Sanchez (FRA)	Lisandra Guerra Rodriguez (CUB)
points race	Giorgia Bronzini (ITA)	Yumari González (CUB)	Tara Whitten (CAN)
scratch race	Annalisa Cucinotta (ITA)	Yumari González (CUB)	Gema Pascual Torrecilla (ESP)
team sprint	France; Sandie Clair; Clara Sanchez	Germany; Kristina Vogel; Miriam Welte	Lithuania; Gintarė Gaivenytė; Simona Krupeckaitė
China, Beijing — 16–18 January 2009
500m time trial	Simona Krupeckaitė (LTU)	Gong Jinjie (CHN)	Xu Yulei (CHN) (Max Success Pro Cycling)
keirin	Simona Krupeckaitė (LTU)	Guo Shuang (CHN)	Willy Kanis (NED)
individual pursuit	Alison Shanks (NZL)	Vilija Sereikaitė (LTU)	Svitlana Halyuk (UKR)
team pursuit	New Zealand; Kaytee Boyd; Lauren Ellis; Alison Shanks	China; Jiang Fan; Sun Feiyan; Wang Cui	Russia; Evgenia Romanyuta; Olga Slyusareva; Elena Chalykh
sprint	Simona Krupeckaitė (LTU)	Lyubov Shulika (UKR)	Willy Kanis (NED)
points race	Jarmila Machačová (CZE)	Wang Cui (CHN)	Giorgia Bronzini (ITA)
scratch race	Evgenia Romanyuta (RUS)	Giorgia Bronzini (ITA)	Belinda Goss (AUS)
team sprint	Netherlands; Yvonne Hijgenaar; Willy Kanis	Lithuania; Gintarė Gaivenytė; Simona Krupeckaitė	China; Gong Jinjie; Zheng Lulu
Denmark, Copenhagen — 13–15 February 2009
500m time trial	Lisandra Guerra Rodriguez (CUB)	Sandie Clair (FRA)	Willy Kanis (NED)
keirin	Clara Sanchez (FRA)	Elisa Frisoni (ITA)	Guo Shuang (CHN)
individual pursuit	Ellen van Dijk (NED)	Tara Whitten (CAN)	Joanna Rowsell (GBR) (Team 100% ME)
team pursuit	Team 100% ME; Elizabeth Armitstead; Katie Colclough; Joanna Rowsell	Netherlands; Vera Koedooder; Amy Pieters; Ellen van Dijk	Germany; Christina Becker; Lisa Brennauer; Verena Joos
sprint	Victoria Pendleton (GBR) (Team Sky+ HD)	Clara Sanchez (FRA)	Lyubov Shulika (UKR)
points race	Ellen van Dijk (NED)	Katie Colclough (GBR) (Team 100% ME)	Shelley Olds (USA)
scratch race	Elizabeth Armitstead (GBR) (Team 100% ME)	Vera Koedooder (NED)	Andrea Wölfer (SUI)
team sprint	Southaustralia.com–AIS; Kaarle McCulloch; Anna Meares	Germany; Kristina Vogel; Miriam Welte	China; Guo Shuang; Zheng Lulu

== See also ==
- 2008–09 UCI Track Cycling World Ranking
- 2008 in track cycling
