= 2011 UCI Track Cycling World Championships – Women's omnium =

Rainbow jersey

The Women's omnium at the 2011 UCI Track Cycling World Championships was held on March 26 and 27. 24 athletes participated in the contest. There were six events held.

== Results ==
=== Flying Lap ===
The Flying Lap was held at 12:20.

Rank	Name	Nation	Time	Notes
1	Leire Olaberria	Spain	14.469	
2	Tara Whitten	Canada	14.691	
3	Marlies Mejías	Cuba	14.789	
4	Kirsten Wild	Netherlands	14.796	
5	Lee Min-Hye	South Korea	14.914	
6	Sarah Hammer	United States	14.935	
7	Małgorzata Wojtyra	Poland	14.960	
8	Lisa Brennauer	Germany	14.976	
9	Joanne Kiesanowski	New Zealand	14.992	
10	Evgenya Romanyuta	Russia	14.998	
11	Amy Cure	Australia	15.052	
12	Hsiao Mei-yu	Chinese Taipei	15.070	
13	Jolien D'Hoore	Belgium	15.072	
14	Tatsiana Sharakova	Belarus	15.131	
15	Angie González	Venezuela	15.140	
16	Laura Trott	Great Britain	15.272	
17	María Luisa Calle	Colombia	15.281	
18	Pascale Jeuland	France	15.282	
19	Pascale Schnider	Switzerland	15.322	
20	Diao Xiao Juan	Hong Kong	15.387	
21	Jutatip Maneephan	Thailand	15.436	
22	Jarmila Machačová	Czech Republic	15.447	
23	Vaida Pikauskaitė	Lithuania	16.051	
24	Minami Uwano	Japan	16.837	

=== Points Race ===
The Points Race was held at 14:10.

Rank	Name	Nation	Laps	Points
1	Tatsiana Sharakova	Belarus	1	25
2	Amy Cure	Australia	1	21
3	Małgorzata Wojtyra	Poland	1	20
4	María Luisa Calle	Colombia	0	15
5	Kirsten Wild	Netherlands	0	12
6	Jarmila Machačová	Czech Republic	0	9
7	Pascale Jeuland	France	0	8
8	Tara Whitten	Canada	0	7
9	Angie González	Venezuela	0	6
10	Pascale Schnider	Switzerland	0	3
11	Sarah Hammer	United States	0	3
12	Lee Min-Hye	South Korea	0	3
13	Laura Trott	Great Britain	0	3
14	Jolien D'Hoore	Belgium	0	3
15	Lisa Brennauer	Germany	0	3
16	Evgenya Romanyuta	Russia	0	2
17	Joanne Kiesanowski	New Zealand	0	2
18	Leire Olaberria	Spain	0	2
19	Vaida Pikauskaitė	Lithuania	0	1
20	Marlies Mejías	Cuba	0	0
21	Hsiao Mei-yu	Chinese Taipei	0	0
22	Jutatip Maneephan	Thailand	0	0
23	Diao Xiao Juan	Hong Kong	0	0
—	Minami Uwano	Japan	-1	DNF

=== Elimination Race ===
The Elimination Race was held at 15:45.

Rank	Name	Nation
1	Evgenya Romanyuta	Russia
2	Joanne Kiesanowski	New Zealand
3	Kirsten Wild	Netherlands
4	Tara Whitten	Canada
5	Sarah Hammer	United States
6	Jutatip Maneephan	Thailand
7	Pascale Jeuland	France
8	Małgorzata Wojtyra	Poland
9	Jolien D'Hoore	Belgium
10	Marlies Mejías	Cuba
11	Amy Cure	Australia
12	Lisa Brennauer	Germany
13	Leire Olaberria	Spain
14	Angie González	Venezuela
15	Hsiao Mei-yu	Chinese Taipei
16	Vaida Pikauskaitė	Lithuania
17	Tatsiana Sharakova	Belarus
18	Lee Min-Hye	South Korea
19	Laura Trott	Great Britain
20	Pascale Schnider	Switzerland
21	Jarmila Machačová	Czech Republic
22	Diao Xiao Juan	Hong Kong
23	María Luisa Calle	Colombia
—	Minami Uwano	Japan

=== Individual Pursuit ===
The Individual Pursuit was held at 10:50.

Rank	Name	Nation	Time	Notes
1	Sarah Hammer	United States	3:34.012	
2	Tara Whitten	Canada	3:36.219	
3	Leire Olaberria	Spain	3:38.880	
4	Laura Trott	Great Britain	3:40.684	
5	Tatsiana Sharakova	Belarus	3:41.419	
6	Amy Cure	Australia	3:41.561	
7	Marlies Mejías	Cuba	3:42.375	
8	María Luisa Calle	Colombia	3:42.441	
9	Kirsten Wild	Netherlands	3:43.167	
10	Lisa Brennauer	Germany	3:44.674	
11	Małgorzata Wojtyra	Poland	3:44.725	
12	Joanne Kiesanowski	New Zealand	3:46.455	
13	Lee Min-Hye	South Korea	3:48.494	
14	Jolien D'Hoore	Belgium	3:48.596	
15	Angie González	Venezuela	3:50.003	
16	Evgenya Romanyuta	Russia	3:50.270	
17	Pascale Jeuland	France	3:50.810	
18	Jarmila Machačová	Czech Republic	3:51.133	
19	Vaida Pikauskaitė	Lithuania	3:52.012	
20	Hsiao Mei-yu	Chinese Taipei	4:00.824	
21	Jutatip Maneephan	Thailand	4:01.548	
22	Diao Xiao Juan	Hong Kong	4:09.802	
–	Pascale Schnider	Switzerland	DNS	

=== Scratch Race ===
The Scratch Race was held at 14:50.

Rank	Name	Nation	Laps down
1	Tatsiana Sharakova	Belarus	
2	Tara Whitten	Canada	
3	Evgenya Romanyuta	Russia	–1
4	Sarah Hammer	United States	–1
5	Kirsten Wild	Netherlands	–1
6	Amy Cure	Australia	–1
7	Marlies Mejías	Cuba	–1
8	Joanne Kiesanowski	New Zealand	–1
9	Laura Trott	Great Britain	–1
10	Małgorzata Wojtyra	Poland	–1
11	Jutatip Maneephan	Thailand	–1
12	Lee Min-Hye	South Korea	–1
13	Leire Olaberria	Spain	–1
14	Jolien D'Hoore	Belgium	–1
15	Pascale Jeuland	France	–1
16	María Luisa Calle	Colombia	–1
17	Angie González	Venezuela	–1
18	Hsiao Mei-yu	Chinese Taipei	–1
19	Jarmila Machačová	Czech Republic	–1
20	Vaida Pikauskaitė	Lithuania	–1
21	Lisa Brennauer	Germany	–1
22	Diao Xiao Juan	Hong Kong	–1

=== Time Trial ===
The Time Trial was held at 16:30.

Rank	Name	Nation	Time	Notes
1	Laura Trott	Great Britain	35.799	
2	Marlies Mejías	Cuba	36.015	
3	Leire Olaberria	Spain	36.143	
4	Sarah Hammer	United States	36.204	
5	Tara Whitten	Canada	36.231	
6	Małgorzata Wojtyra	Poland	36.272	
7	Hsiao Mei-yu	Chinese Taipei	36.382	
8	Tatsiana Sharakova	Belarus	36.604	
9	Joanne Kiesanowski	New Zealand	36.687	
10	Jolien D'Hoore	Belgium	36.756	
11	Evgenya Romanyuta	Russia	36.764	
12	Jutatip Maneephan	Thailand	36.833	
13	Lee Min-Hye	South Korea	36.940	
14	Angie González	Venezuela	37.092	
15	Lisa Brennauer	Germany	37.158	
16	Kirsten Wild	Netherlands	37.557	
17	Amy Cure	Australia	37.803	
18	Vaida Pikauskaitė	Lithuania	38.247	
19	María Luisa Calle	Colombia	38.646	
20	Diao Xiao Juan	Hong Kong	38.808	
21	Jarmila Machačová	Czech Republic	38.819	
22	Pascale Jeuland	France	38.961	

=== Standings ===
Rank	Name	Nation	Total
1st place, gold medalist(s)	Tara Whitten	Canada	23
2nd place, silver medalist(s)	Sarah Hammer	United States	31
3rd place, bronze medalist(s)	Kirsten Wild	Netherlands	42
4	Małgorzata Wojtyra	Poland	45
5	Tatsiana Sharakova	Belarus	46
6	Marlies Mejías	Cuba	49
7	Leire Olaberria	Spain	51
8	Amy Cure	Australia	53
9	Joanne Kiesanowski	New Zealand	57
10	Evgenya Romanyuta	Russia	57
11	Laura Trott	Great Britain	62
12	Lee Min-Hye	South Korea	73
13	Jolien D'Hoore	Belgium	74
14	Lisa Brennauer	Germany	81
15	Angie González	Venezuela	84
16	Pascale Jeuland	France	86
17	María Luisa Calle	Colombia	87
18	Hsiao Mei-yu	Chinese Taipei	93
19	Jutatip Maneephan	Thailand	93
20	Jarmila Machačová	Czech Republic	107
21	Vaida Pikauskaitė	Lithuania	115
22	Diao Xiao Juan	Hong Kong	129
–	Pascale Schnider	Switzerland	DNF
–	Minami Uwano	Japan	DNF
