= 2012–13 UCI Track Cycling World Cup =

International track cycling competition

2012–2013 UCI Track Cycling World Cup
- Twenty-first edition of the UCI Track Cycling World Cup

Details
- Dates: 11 October 2012 – 19 January 2013
- Location: Colombia, United Kingdom and Mexico
- Races: 3

The 2012–2013 UCI Track Cycling World Cup (also known as the 2012–2013 UCI Track Cycling World Cup, presented by Samsung for sponsorship reasons.) is a multi race tournament over a track cycling. It was the twenty-first series of the UCI Track Cycling World Cup organised by the Union Cycliste Internationale. The series ran from 11 October 2012 to 19 January 2013 and consisted of three rounds in Cali, Glasgow and Aguascalientes.

== Series ==
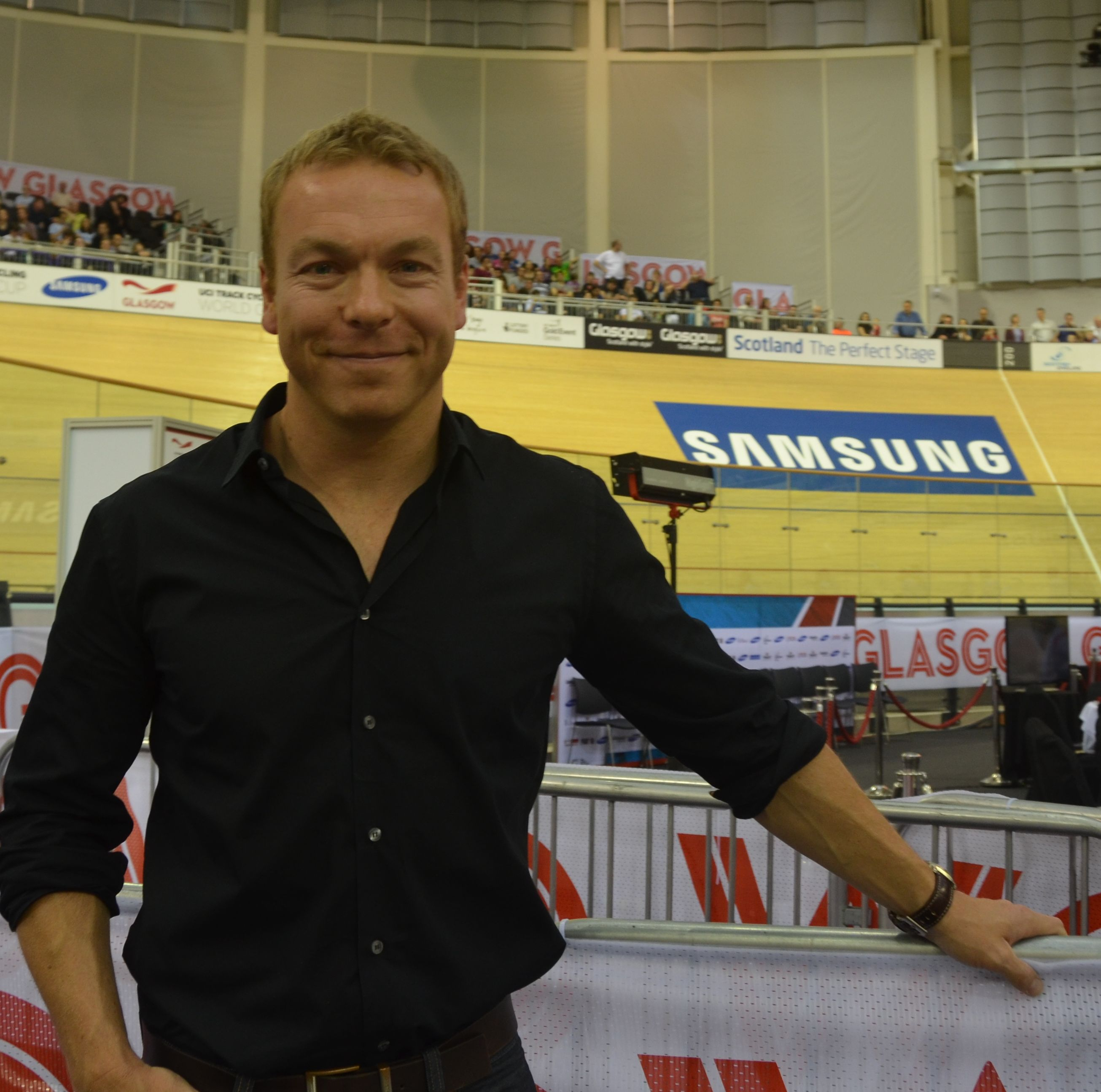
Sir Chris Hoy at the Velodrome that bears his name, Glasgow

The 2012–2013 UCI Track Cycling World Cup consisted of three rounds, in Cali (Colombia), Glasgow (United Kingdom) and Aguascalientes (Mexico).

=== Cali, Colombia ===
The first round of the World Cup was hosted in Cali, the third most populated city in Colombia. Cali has hosted the World Cup on twelve occasions. This round was hosted between 11 and 13 October 2012 at the Unidad Deportiva Alberto Galindo Velodrome.

=== Glasgow, United Kingdom ===
The second round of the World Cup was hosted in Glasgow, the largest city in Scotland. This round was hosted between 16 and 18 November 2012 at the Sir Chris Hoy Velodrome.

The World Cup was the first major competition to be held at the Sir Chris Hoy Velodrome, which was built for the 2014 Commonwealth Games and officially opened on 5 October 2012. Tickets for the event sold out in under an hour when released to the general public; this followed a pre-sale for British Cycling members which sold out in 24 hours.

=== Aguascalientes, Mexico ===
The third round of the World Cup was hosted in Aguascalientes. This round was hosted between 17 and 19 January 2013 at the Aguascalientes Bicentenary Velodrome.

== Overall team standings ==
Overall team standings are calculated based on total number of points gained by the team's riders in each event. The top ten teams after the third and final round are listed below:

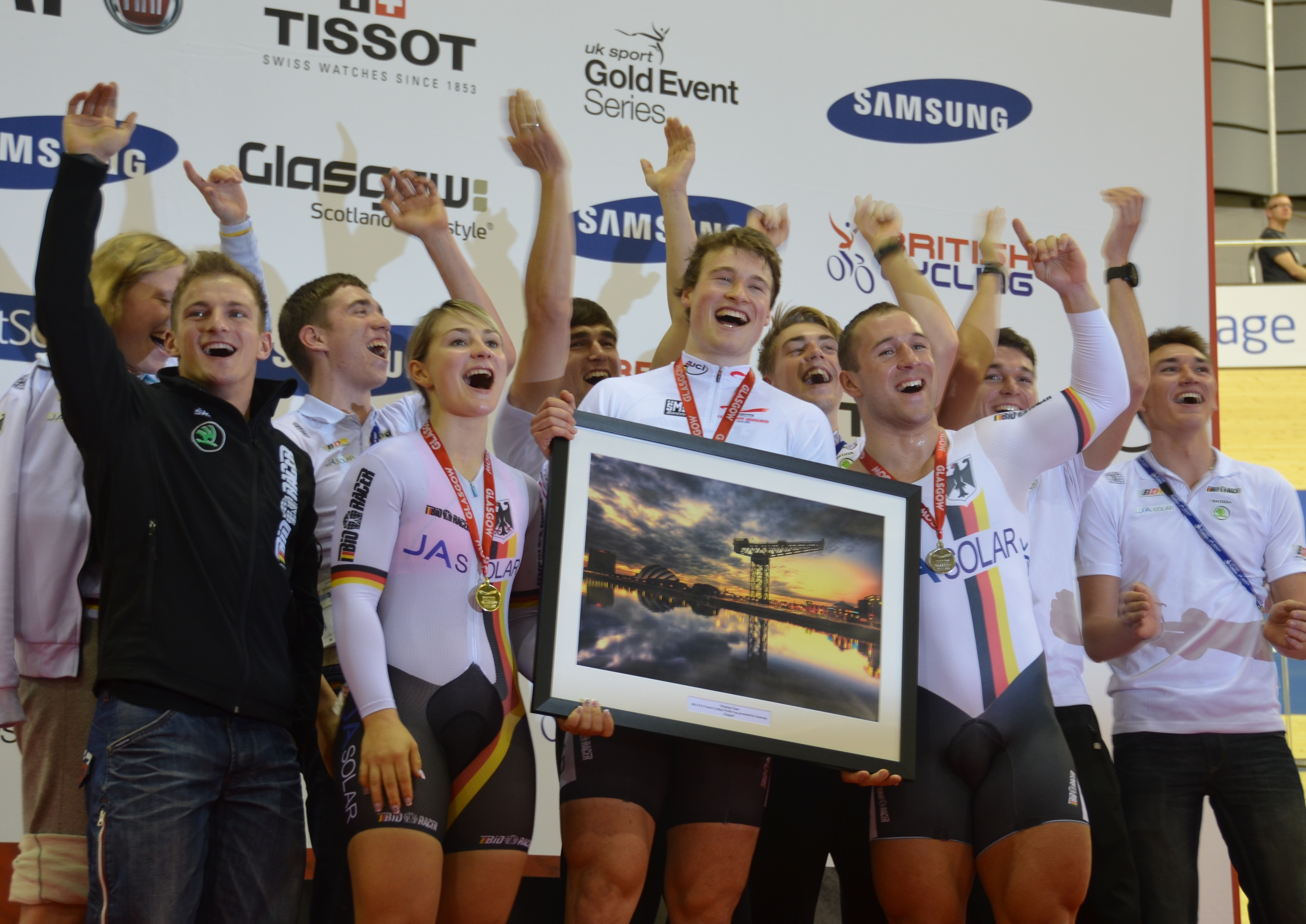
The German team (pictured in Glasgow) won the overall team standings.

Rank	Team	Round 1	Round 2	Round 3	Total Points
1	Germany	47	109	22	178
2	Great Britain	54	102		156
3	France	27	48	65	140
4	Australia	24	34	62	120
5	Russia	37	30	37	104
6	Spain	40	56	8	104
7	Colombia	87		10	97
8	Italy	49	4	30	83
9	Japan	45	19	15	79
10	Poland	27	20	24	71

== Results ==
=== Men ===
Event	Winner	Second	Third
Colombia, Cali – 11–13 October 2012
Sprint details (PDF)	Philipp Thiele (GER)	Fabián Puerta (COL)	Eric Engler (GER)
Kilo details (PDF)	Fabián Puerta (COL); 1:00.982	Kian Emadi (GBR); 1:01.368	Quentin Lafargue (FRA); 1:01.386
Team Pursuit details (PDF)	Colombia; Weimar Roldán; Arles Castro; Juan Esteban Arango; Edwin Ávila; 4:05.456	Russia; Sergey Shilov; Maksim Kozyrev; Pavel Karpenkov; Dmitriy Sokolov; 4:07.977	Switzerland; Cyrille Thièry; Frank Pasche; Kilian Moser; Loïc Perizzolo; 4:08.821
Team Sprint details (PDF)	Germany; Marc Schroeder; Eric Engler; Philipp Thiele; 44.150	Japan; Kenta Inake; Takashi Sakamoto; Tomoyuki Kawabata; 45.947	Venezuela; Ángel Pulgar; César Marcano; Juan Orellana; 47.128
Keirin details (PDF)	Fabián Puerta (COL)	Tomoyuki Kawabata (JPN)	Marc Schroeder (GER)
Points Race details (PDF)	Andreas Graf (AUT); 76 pts	Wojciech Pszczolarski (POL); 70 pts	Jonathan Mould (GBR) (SWI Welsh Cycling Track Team); 67 pts
Omnium details (PDF)	Paolo Simion (ITA); 30 pts	David Muntaner (ESP); 34 pts	Loïc Perizzolo (SUI); 35 pts
Great Britain, Glasgow – 16–18 November 2012
Sprint details (PDF)	Stefan Bötticher (GER)	Robert Förstemann (GER)	Denis Dmitriev (RUS) (RusVelo)
Pursuit details (PDF)	Lasse Norman Hansen (DEN); 4:20.875	Martyn Irvine (IRL); 4:22.745	David Muntaner (ESP); 4:28.429
Team Pursuit details (PDF)	Denmark; Casper Folsach; Lasse Norman Hansen; Mathias Møller Nielsen; Rasmus Christian Quaade; 4:01.289	Germany; Maximilian Beyer; Henning Bommel; Theo Reinhardt; Kersten Thiele overtaken	Belgium; Kenny De Ketele; Jasper De Buyst; Moreno De Pauw; Gijs Van Hoecke; 4:06.951
Team Sprint details (PDF)	Germany; René Enders; Robert Förstemann; Stefan Bötticher; 43.887	Great Britain; Philip Hindes; Jason Kenny; Ed Clancy; 44.175	France; Julien Palma; Kevin Sireau; Quentin Lafargue; 44.803
Keirin	Stefan Bötticher (GER)	Peter Lewis (AUS) (Team Jayco–AIS)	Takashi Sakamoto (JPN)
Scratch Race details (PDF)	Tristan Marguet (SUI)	Martyn Irvine (IRL)	Roy Eefting (NED)
Omnium details (PDF)	Lucas Liss (GER); 30 pts	Glenn O'Shea (AUS); 31 pts	Unai Elorriaga (ESP); 35 pts
Mexico, Aguascalientes – 17–19 January 2013
Sprint details (PDF)	Denis Dmitriev (RUS) (RusVelo)	Max Niederlag (GER)	Juan Peralta (ESP) (Reyno De Navarra-Telco-M-Conor)
Team Pursuit details (PDF)	Russia; Nikolay Zhurkin; Alexander Serov; Ivan Savitckiy; Evgeny Kovalev; 4:00.970	Switzerland; Stefan Küng; Silvan Dillier; Tom Bohli; Loïc Perizzolo; 4:03.604	Italy; Michele Scartezzini; Francesco Lamon; Marco Coledan; Liam Bertazzo; 4:04.453
Team Sprint details (PDF)	New Zealand; Edward Dawkins; Sam Webster; Ethan Mitchell; 43.052	France; François Pervis; Michaël D'Almeida; Kévin Sireau; 43.186	Australia; Peter Lewis; Mitchell Bullen; Alex Bird; 43.584
Keirin details (PDF)	Matthijs Büchli (NED)	Kazunari Watanabe (JPN) (Cyclo Channel Tokyo)	François Pervis (FRA)
Madison details (PDF)	France; Vivien Brisse; Thomas Boudat; 12 pts	Ukraine; Mykhaylo Radionov; Sergiy Lagkuti; 3 pts	Switzerland; Silvan Dillier; Stefan Küng; 10 pts (−1 lap)
Omnium details (PDF)	Artur Ershov (RUS); 16 pts	Vivien Brisse (FRA); 39 pts	Ondřej Rybín (CZE); 42 pts

=== Women ===
Event	Winner	Second	Third
Colombia, Cali – 11–13 October 2012
Sprint details (PDF)	Lee Wai Sze (HKG)	Becky James (GBR)	Jess Varnish (GBR)
Team Pursuit details (PDF)	Italy; Maria Giulia Confalonieri; Beatrice Bartelloni; Giulia Donato; 3:30.062	SWI Welsh Cycling Track Team; Amy Roberts; Ciara Horne; Elinor Barker; 3:30.891	Colombia; Valentina Paniagua; María Luisa Calle; Lorena Vargas caught opponents
Team Sprint details (PDF)	Great Britain; Becky James; Jess Varnish; 33.734	Japan; Hiroko Ishii; Kayono Maeda; 35.391	Colombia; Juliana Gaviria; Martha Bayona; 35.036
Keirin details (PDF)	Juliana Gaviria (COL)	Luz Daniela Gaxiola (MEX)	Virginie Cueff (FRA)
Scratch Race details (PDF)	Isabella King (AUS)	Jarmila Machačová (CZE)	Elena Cecchini (ITA)
Omnium details (PDF)	Isabella King (AUS); 10 pts	Natalia Rutkowska (POL); 22 pts	Jarmila Machačová (CZE); 23 pts
Great Britain, Glasgow – 16–18 November 2012
Sprint details (PDF)	Kristina Vogel (GER)	Jess Varnish (GBR)	Becky James (GBR)
500m Time Trial details (PDF)	Olga Panarina (BLR); 34.121	Kristina Vogel (GER); 34.318	Tania Calvo (ESP); 34.451
Team Pursuit details (PDF)	Great Britain; Laura Trott; Elinor Barker; Danielle King; 3:21.043	Australia; Ashlee Ankudinoff; Amy Cure; Melissa Hoskins; 3:22.026	Belarus; Tatsiana Sharakova; Alena Dylko; Aksana Papko; 3:25.737
Team Sprint details (PDF)	Great Britain; Jess Varnish; Becky James; 33.428	Spain; Tania Calvo; Helena Casas Roige; 34.102	France; Sandie Clair; Olivia Montauban; 34.197
Keirin details (PDF)	Kristina Vogel (GER)	Ekaterina Gnidenko (RUS) (Petroholding-Leningrad)	Lee Wai Sze (HKG)
Omnium details (PDF)	Laura Trott (GBR); 24 pts	Ashlee Ankudinoff (AUS); 24 pts	Tamara Balabolina (RUS); 26 pts
Mexico, Aguascalientes – 17–19 January 2013
Sprint details (PDF)	Gong Jinjie (CHN) (Giant Pro Cycling)	Lisandra Guerra Rodriguez (CUB)	Lee Wai Sze (HKG)
Individual Pursuit details (PDF)	Katarzyna Pawłowska (POL); 3:30.390	María Luisa Calle (COL); 3:32.020	Rebecca Wiasak (AUS); 3:32.037
Team Pursuit details (PDF)	Canada; Gillian Carleton; Jasmin Glaesser; Stephanie Roorda; Caught opponents	Ukraine; Ivanna Borovychenko; Valeriya Kononenko; Anna Nahirna; Overtaken	Team USN; Elinor Barker; Amy Roberts; Ciara Horne; 3:24.419
Team Sprint details (PDF)	Australia; Kaarle McCulloch; Stephanie Morton; 33.033	China; Xu Yulei; Zhong Tianshi; 33.307	Russia; Daria Shmeleva; Anastasiia Voynova; 33.567
Keirin details (PDF)	Zhong Tianshi (CHN)	Gong Jinjie (CHN) (Giant Pro Cycling)	Xu Yulei (CHN)
Points race details (PDF)	Katarzyna Pawłowska (POL); 51 pts	Jarmila Machačová (CZE); 41 pts	Yudelmis Domínguez Massagué (CUB); 40 pts
Omnium details (PDF)	Sarah Hammer (USA); 14 pts	Huang Li (CHN) (Giant Pro Cycling); 21 pts	Leire Olaberria (ESP); 31 pts
