= 2010 UCI Track Cycling World Championships – Women's omnium =

Rainbow jersey

The women's omnium is one of the 9 women's events at the 2010 UCI Track Cycling World Championships, held in Ballerup, Denmark.

This was the second time a women's omnium event had ever been included in the World Championships. 17 cyclists from 17 countries participated in the contest. The omnium consisted of five events, which were all contested on 27 March: a sprint 200 m time trial with a flying start, scratch race, 2 km individual pursuit, points race and a 500 m time trial.

== Overall standings ==
Rank	Name	Nation	200 m TT	Scratch	Pursuit	Points Race	500 m TT	Total
1st place, gold medalist(s)	Tara Whitten	Canada	2	9	3	6	3	23
2nd place, silver medalist(s)	Lizzie Armitstead	Great Britain	6	2	9	3	9	29
3rd place, bronze medalist(s)	Leire Olaberria	Spain	3	5	4	10	8	30
4	Yvonne Hijgenaar	Netherlands	1	7	10	11	1	30
5	Sarah Hammer	United States	7	16	1	2	6	32
6	Vilija Sereikaitė	Lithuania	4	13	2	14	2	35
7	Charlotte Becker	Germany	15	1	6	5	12	39
8	Gemma Dudley	New Zealand	9	10	7	7	7	40
9	Lada Kozlíková	Czech Republic	8	11	5	12	5	41
10	Tatsiana Sharakova	Belarus	11	14	8	1	10	44
11	Yumari González	Cuba	5	8	11	9	11	44
12	Renata Dąbrowska	Poland	13	4	13	13	4	47
13	Diao Xiao Juan	Hong Kong	16	3	15	8	14	56
14	Barbara Guarischi	Italy	17	6	14	4	15	56
15	Wu Chaomei	China	12	15	12	15	13	67
