= Wang Chongyang (cyclist) =

Chinese cyclist

Personal information
- Born: 13 June 1988 (age 38)

Cycling career
- Sport: Cycling
- Discipline: Track cycling
- Role: Rider
- Rider type: sprinter

Wang Chongyang (born 13 June 1988) is a Chinese male track cyclist, riding for the national team. He competed in the 1 km time trial event at the 2010 UCI Track Cycling World Championships.
