= Tara Whitten =

Canadian cyclist

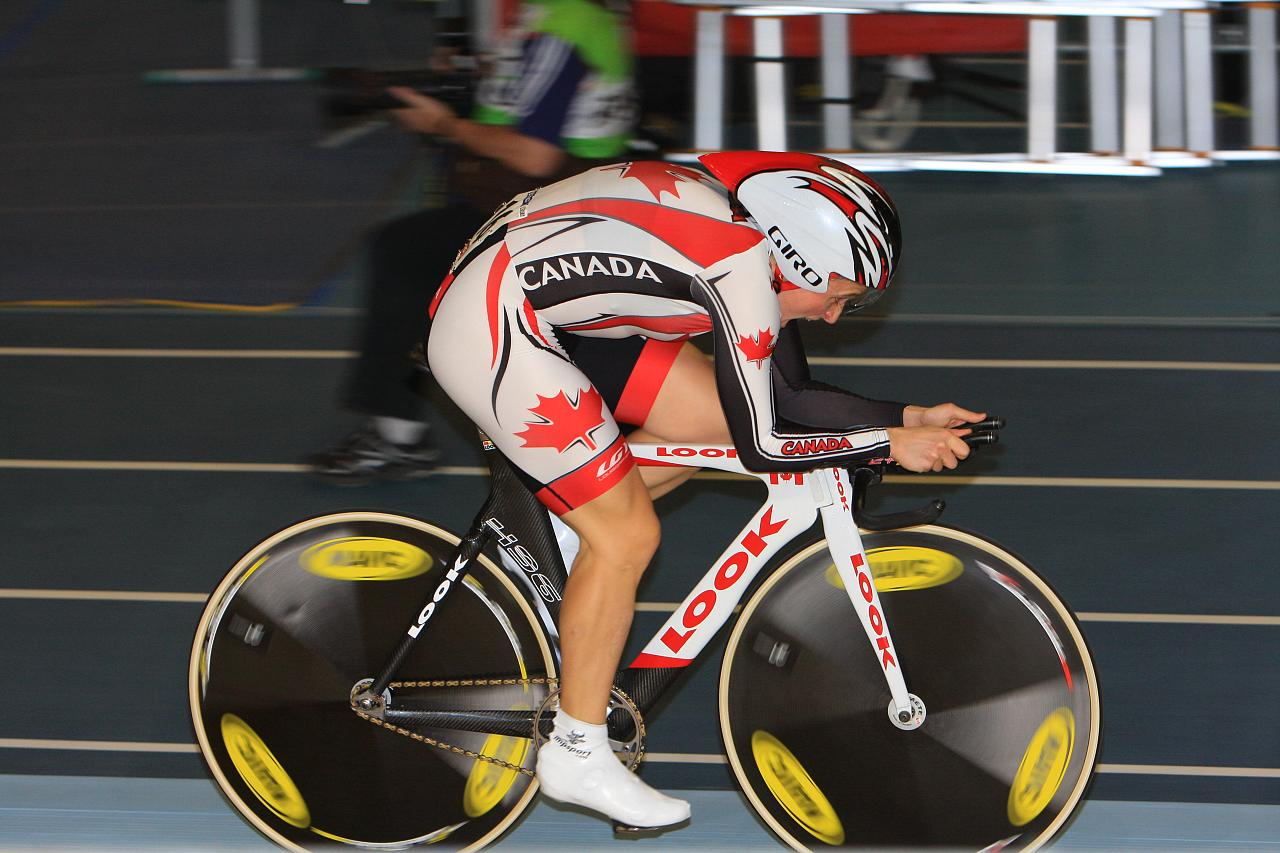

Personal information
- Full name: Tara Alice Whitten
- Born: 13 July 1980 (age 46) Edmonton, Alberta, Canada

Cycling career
- Sport: Cycling
- Current team: Retired
- Disciplines: Track; Road
- Role: Rider
- Rider type: Endurance

Professional team
- 2011–2012: Team TIBCO–To The Top
Medal record
Representing Canada
Women's track cycling
Summer Olympics
Bronze medal – third place	2012 London	Team pursuit
World Championship
Gold medal – first place	2010 Ballerup	Omnium
Gold medal – first place	2010 Ballerup	Points race
Gold medal – first place	2011 Apeldoorn	Omnium
Silver medal – second place	2009 Pruszków	Omnium
Bronze medal – third place	2012 Melbourne	Team pursuit
Pan American Championships
Gold medal – first place	2009 Mexico	Omnium
Gold medal – first place	2009 Mexico	Individual pursuit
Silver medal – second place	2009 Mexico	Team sprint
Silver medal – second place	2015 Puebla	Individual time trial
Silver medal – second place	2009 Mexico	Individual time trial
Bronze medal – third place	2009 Mexico	Points race
Bronze medal – third place	2009 Mexico	Team pursuit
Women's road bicycle racing
Pan American Championships
Silver medal – second place	2009 Hidalgo	Time trial
Silver medal – second place	2015 León	Time trial
Women's cross-country skiing
U23 World Championships
Silver medal – second place	2003 Valdidentro	Individual sprint

Tara Alice Whitten (born 13 July 1980) is a Canadian former racing cyclist.

== Career ==
A former cross-country skier from Edmonton, Alberta, Whitten began track racing seriously in 2008 having dabbled in it since 2005. The same year she won the points race and individual pursuit at the Canadian National Track Championships, and also took the bronze medal in the scratch race and 500 meter time trial events.

Whitten began the 2008–2009 track cycling season strongly, winning two silver medals at first round of the Track World Cup in Manchester, United Kingdom, in October. She went on to take two bronze medals in the third round in Cali, Colombia, and a further two silver medals in the fifth and final round in Copenhagen, Denmark, in February 2009.

In March 2009, Whitten won the silver medal in the Omnium at the 2009 UCI Track Cycling World Championships in Pruszków, the first time the event was included in the championships.

In December 2009, Whitten rode on the team that won the gold medal in the 2010 UCI Track Cycling World Cup Classics Women's Team Pursuit in Cali, Colombia, along with fellow Canadian National Team members Laura Brown and Stephanie Roorda, concurrently setting a new Canadian National Record in this event as well with a time of 3:27.289. Of note, the Women's Team Pursuit has been added as an Olympic event for 2012. She also won two silver medals, in the Individual Pursuit (time of 3:34.547) and Points Race.

In March 2010, Whitten won the gold medal in the Omnium and Points race at the 2010 UCI Track Cycling World Championships in Ballerup.

At the 2012 Summer Olympics, she was part of the Canadian team that won the bronze medal in the women's team pursuit. She finished fourth in the omnium.

In March 2016 Whitten was injured in Rio de Janeiro during a visit to inspect the road course for the 2016 Summer Olympics, running her bike into the back of a bus and being knocked unconscious and breaking a bone in the base of her skull. The interruption to her training delayed her qualifying for the Olympics, but she was officially named to Canada's 2016 Olympic team.

== Personal life ==
Whitten was awarded a PhD in neuroscience from the University of Alberta on 10 June 2016, having first earned a science degree in 2006 and been accepted into an electrophysiology lab as a master's student in 2007, while taking periodic breaks from her studies to focus on cycling full-time. She began a post-doctoral fellowship in concussion research at the University of Calgary in fall 2016.

== Major results ==
=== Track ===
2008
National Track Championships

1st Individual pursuit
1st Points race
3rd 500m time trial
3rd Scratch

2008–09 UCI Track Cycling World Cup Classics

2nd Individual pursuit, Manchester
2nd Scratch, Manchester
3rd Individual pursuit, Cali
3rd Points race, Cali

2009
2009–10 UCI Track Cycling World Cup Classics, Cali

1st Team pursuit
2nd Individual pursuit
2nd Points race

2nd Omnium, UCI Track Cycling World Championships
2nd Individual pursuit, 2008–09 UCI Track Cycling World Cup Classics, Copenhagen
2010
UCI Track Cycling World Championships

1st Omnium
1st Points race

Omnium, 2010–11 UCI Track Cycling World Cup Classics

2nd Melbourne
2nd Cali

Commonwealth Games

3rd Individual pursuit
3rd Points race
3rd Team sprint

2009–10 UCI Track Cycling World Cup Classics, Beijing

3rd Individual pursuit
3rd Team pursuit

2011
1st Omnium, UCI Track Cycling World Championships
1st Overall, Omnium, 2010–11 UCI Track Cycling World Ranking
2010–11 UCI Track Cycling World Cup Classics, Beijing

1st Omnium
2nd Team pursuit

2nd Omnium, 2011–12 UCI Track Cycling World Cup, Cali
2012
2nd Team pursuit, 2011–12 UCI Track Cycling World Cup, London
3rd Team pursuit, Summer Olympics
3rd Team pursuit, UCI Track Cycling World Championships

=== Road ===
2009
1st Time trial, National Road Championships
8th UCI Road World Championships – Women's time trial
2010
Commonwealth Games

1st Time trial
7th Road race

National Road Championships

2nd Road race
3rd Time trial

6th Chrono Gatineau
7th UCI Road World Championships – Women's time trial
9th Grand Prix Cycliste de Gatineau
2011
2nd Time trial, National Road Championships
4th UCI Road World Championships – Women's time trial
6th Chrono Champenois
2012
4th Chrono Gatineau
2015
2nd Time trial, Pan American Road Championships
8th Overall Joe Martin Stage Race
8th Chrono Gatineau
2016
1st Time trial, National Road Championships
1st Overall Cascade Cycling Classic

1st Mountains classification
1st Stages 2 (ITT) & 5

2nd Chrono Gatineau
7th Time trial, Summer Olympics
