= Pablo Bernal =

Spanish cyclist

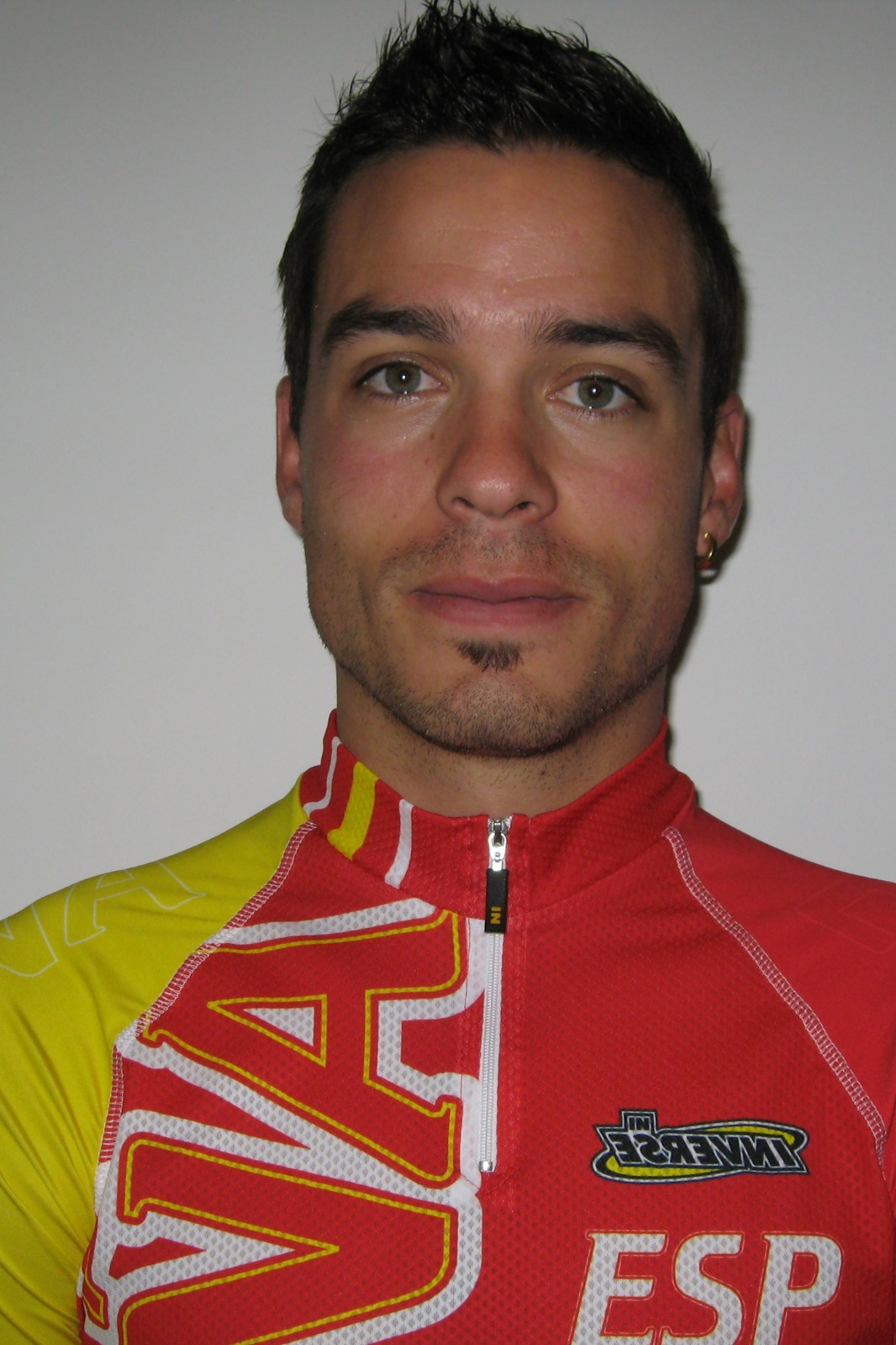
Pablo Bernal

Pablo Aitor Bernal Rosique (born August 25, 1986) is a Spanish track cyclist. At the 2012 Summer Olympics, he competed in the Men's team pursuit for the national team. He was born in Alhama de Murcia.
