= Isabella King =

Australian cyclist (born 1992)

Personal information
- Born: 9 April 1992 (age 34)

Cycling career
- Sport: Cycling
- Discipline: Track cycling
- Role: Rider
- Rider type: individual pursuit

Isabella King (born 9 April 1992) is an Australian female track cyclist. She won the bronze medal in the team pursuit event at the 2014 UCI Track Cycling World Championships, numerous UCI Track World Cup medals, a Junior World Title and World Record. She retired prior to Rio Olympics due to injury/illness.

== 2016 ==
1st Teams Pursuit UCI Track Cycling Championships
2nd Points Race Australian Track Cycling Championships
2015
2nd Teams Pursuit Track Cycling World Cup England
4th Omnium Track Cycling World Cup England
2014
2nd Omnium Track Cycling World Cup Mexico
2nd Omnium Australian Track Cycling Championships
2nd Teams Pursuit Australian Track Cycling Championships
2nd Omnium Australian Track Cycling Championships
3rd Teams Pursuit Track Cycling World Championships
3rd Teams Pursuit Track Cycling World Cup Colombia
3rd Teams Pursuit Track Cycling World Cup Mexico
3rd Madison Australian Track Cycling Championships
3rd Scratch Race Australian Track Cycling Championships
5th Omnium Track Cycling World Cup Colombia

2013
1st Omnium Track Cycling World Cup Colombia
1st Scratch Race Track Cycling World Cup Colombia
1st Teams Pursuit Australian Track Cycling Championships
3rd Scratch Race Australian Track Cycling Championships
3rd Omnium Australian Track Cycling Championships
2012:
1st Scratch Race Australian Track Cycling Championships
2nd Omnium Australian Track Cycling Championships
4th Omnium Track Cycling World Cup Beijing

2011:
1st Teams Pursuit Australian Track Cycling Championships
2nd Omnium Oceania Track Championships
3rd Omnium Australian Track Cycling Championships
5th Teams Pursuit Track Cycling World Cup Manchester

2010:
1st Team Pursuit UCI Junior Track World Championships
1st U19 Omnium Australian Track Cycling Championships
1st U19 Scratch Race Australian Track Cycling Championships
2nd Omnium Junior Track World Championships
2nd U19 Points Race Australian Track Cycling Championships
3rd U19 Individual Pursuit Australian Track Cycling Championships
