= Valentina Paniagua =

Colombian cyclist

Personal information
- Born: 19 April 1994 (age 32)

Cycling career
- Sport: Cycling
- Disciplines: road and track
- Role: Rider

Valentina Paniagua (born 19 April 1994) is a Colombian professional track and road racing cyclist. She won the Colombian National Road Race Championships in 2014. She competed in the team pursuit event at the 2014 UCI Track Cycling World Championships.

== Major results ==
2014
3rd Team Pursuit, Central American and Caribbean Games (with Jessica Parra, Jannie Milena Salcedo Zambrano and Lorena Maria Vargas Villamil)
