= Leire Olaberria =

Spanish cyclist

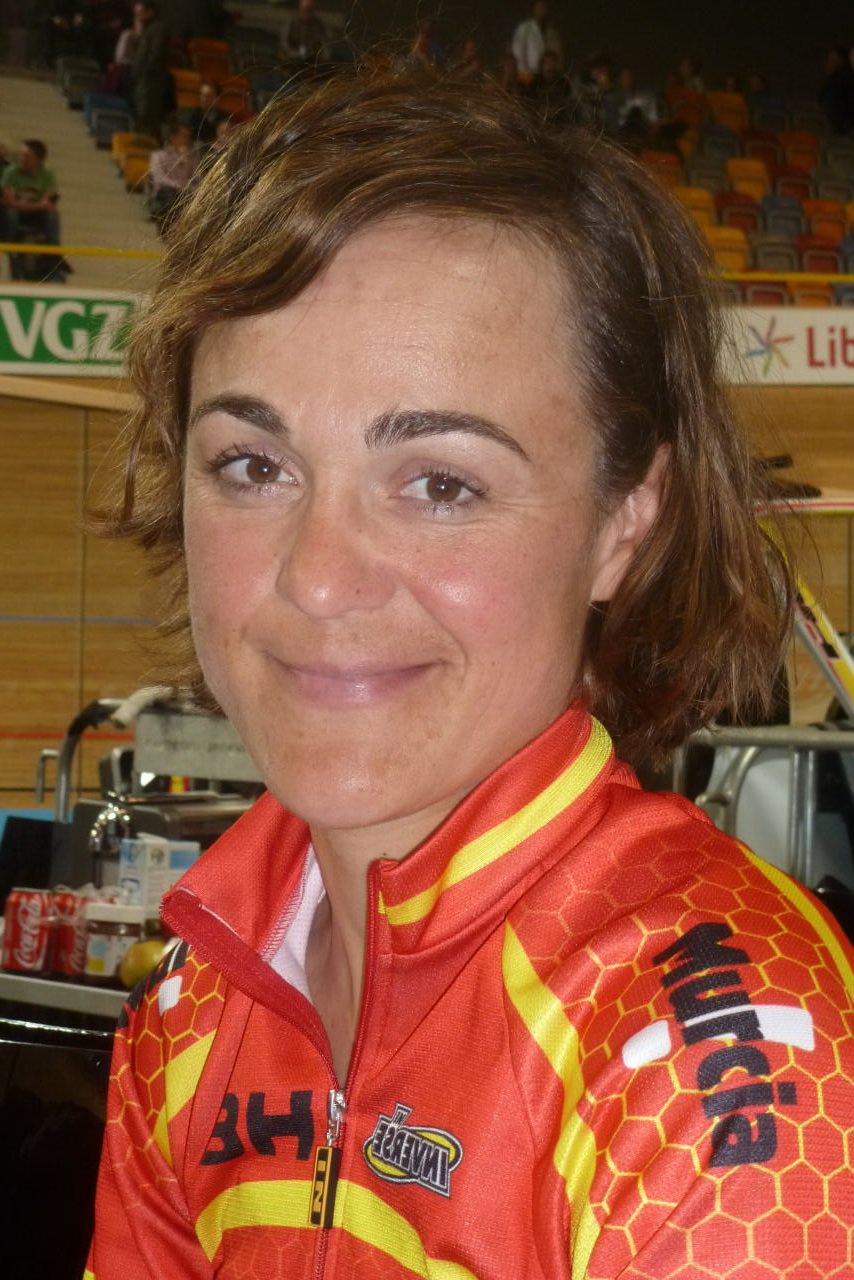
- Olaberria in 2011

Personal information
- Full name: Leire Olaberria Dorronsoro
- Born: 17 February 1977 (age 49) Ikaztegieta, Gipuzkoa, Spain
- Height: 1.72 m (5 ft 7 1/2 in)
- Weight: 62 kg (137 lb)

Cycling career
- Sport: Cycling
- Disciplines: Track; Road
- Role: Rider

Amateur teams
- 2009: Lointek (guest)
- 2015: Fullgas

Professional teams
- 2010–2012: Debabarrena–Kirolgi
- 2013–2014: Bizkaia–Durango
- 2015: Bizkaia–Durango
Medal record
Representing Spain
Women's track cycling
Olympic Games
Bronze medal – third place	2008 Beijing	Points race
World Championships
Bronze medal – third place	2010 Ballerup	Omnium
European Championships
Gold medal – first place	2010 Pruszków	Omnium
Bronze medal – third place	2013 Apeldoorn	Points race

Leire Olaberria Dorronsoro ([ˈleiɾe]; born 17 February 1977) is a Spanish racing cyclist from the Basque Country. She won the Bronze medal in the Women's points race at the 2008 Summer Olympics, finishing behind Marianne Vos (Netherlands) and Yoanka González (Cuba).

== Major results ==
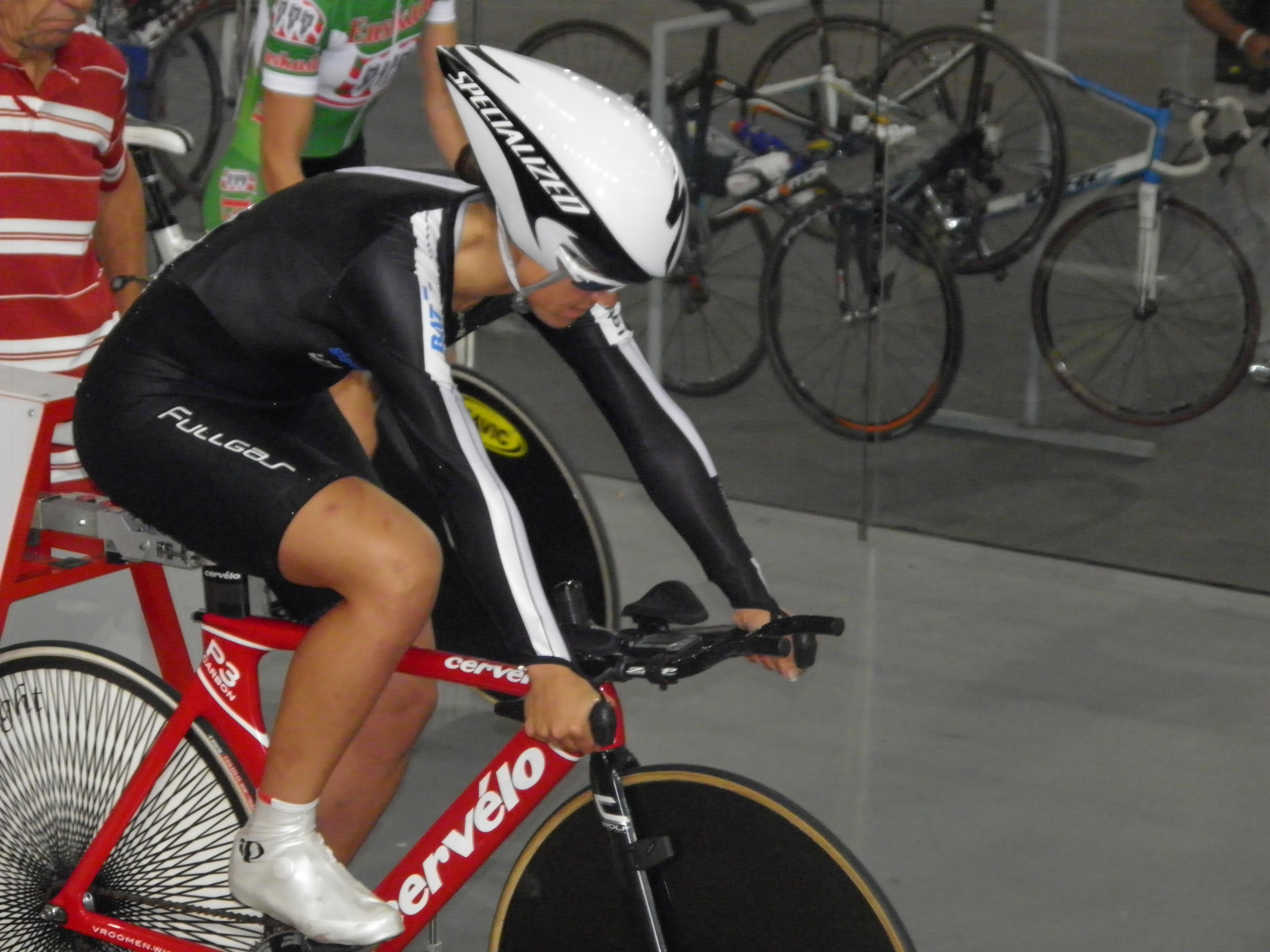
Olaberria at the start of an individual pursuit race in Mallorca in 2010

=== Track ===
2006
2nd Points race, 2005–06 UCI Track Cycling World Cup Classics, Sydney
2007
3rd Points race, 2006–07 UCI Track Cycling World Cup Classics, Los Angeles
2008
2nd Points race, 2008–09 UCI Track Cycling World Cup Classics, Melbourne
3rd Points race, Summer Olympics
2010
1st Omnium, 2010–11 UCI Track Cycling World Cup Classics, Melbourne
1st Omnium, UEC European Track Championships
3rd Omnium, UCI Track Cycling World Championships
2013
International Belgian Open

1st Omnium
1st Scratch

Revolution Series, Round 1

2nd Scratch
3rd Points race

3rd Omnium, 2012–13 UCI Track Cycling World Cup, Aguascalientes
3rd Points race, UEC European Track Championships
2014
Prova Internacional de Anadia

1st Omnium
2nd Scratch

2nd Omnium, Revolution – Round 5, London
2nd Scratch, Fenioux Trophy Piste
3rd Omnium, Fenioux Piste International
2015
2nd Omnium, 2014–15 UCI Track Cycling World Cup, Cali
Revolution

2nd Scratch – Round 3, Manchester
3rd Points race – Round 5, London
3rd Points race – Round 6, Manchester
3rd Scratch – Round 1, Derby

2nd Scratch, Grand Prix of Poland
Irish International Track GP

3rd Individual pursuit
3rd Omnium

2017
3rd Points race, Trofeo Ciutat de Barcelona–Memorial Miquel Poblet

=== Road ===
2009
3rd Time trial, National Road Championships
2010
National Road Championships

1st Road race
1st Time trial

2011
9th Overall Tour de Bretagne Féminin
2013
2nd Time trial, National Road Championships
2014
1st Time trial, National Road Championships
2015
3rd Time trial, National Road Championships

== See also ==
- Spain at the 2008 Summer Olympics
