= Andrea Botero Coy =

Colombian cyclist

Personal information
- Born: 25 June 1988 (age 38)

Cycling career
- Sport: Cycling
- Discipline: Track cycling
- Role: Rider

Andrea Botero Coy (born 25 June 1988) is a Colombian female track cyclist, and part of the national team. She competed in the omnium and team pursuit event at the 2009 UCI Track Cycling World Championships.
