= Kaytee Boyd =

New Zealand cyclist (born 1978)

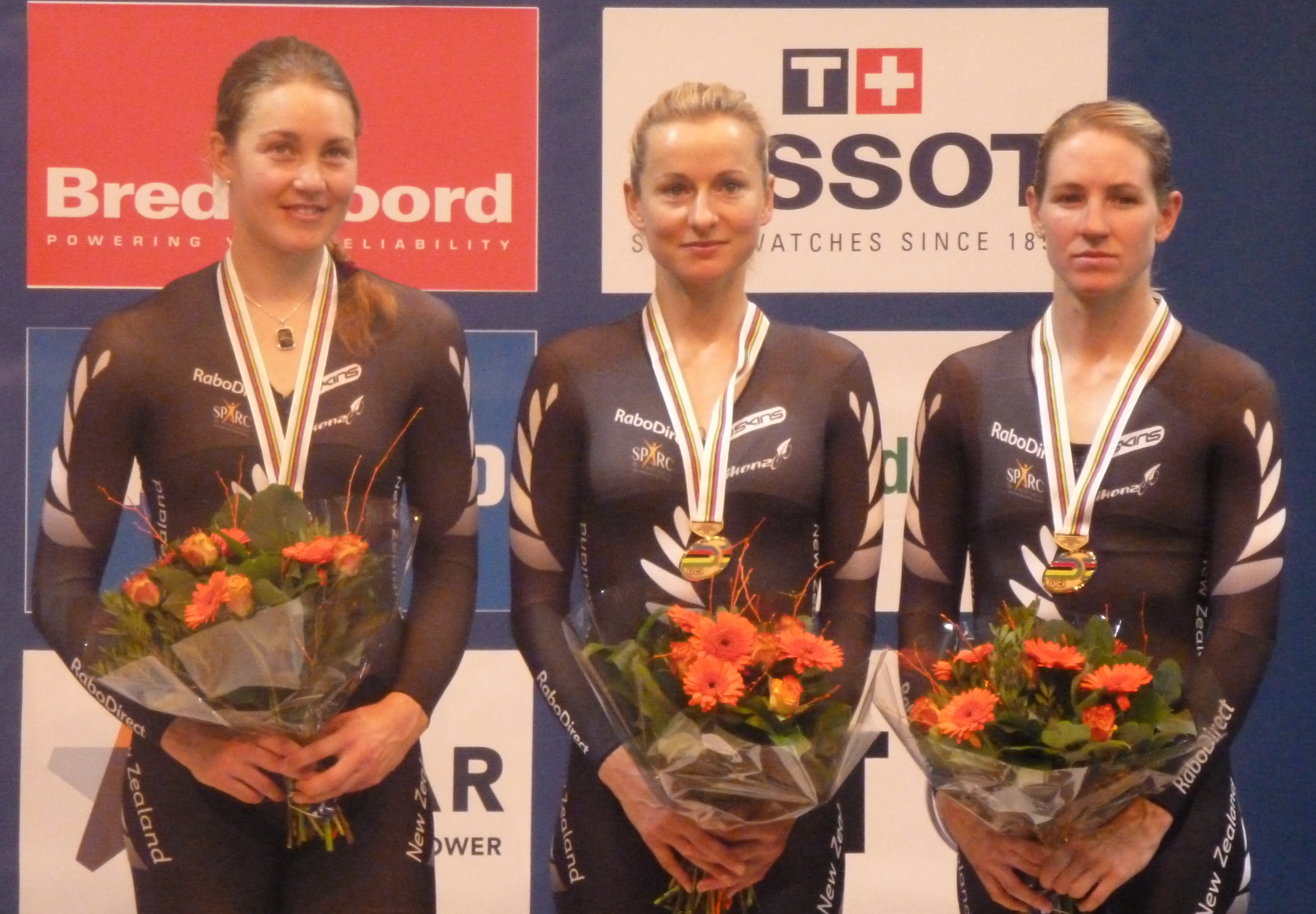
- Boyd in the centre
- Born: 8 February 1978 (age 48); Hamilton, New Zealand

Kaytee Boyd (born 8 February 1978) is a New Zealand track and road cyclist.

== Life ==
Boyd was born in Hamilton, New Zealand in 1978. Her first sport was mountain biking. She was lured away from mountain biking to take up track cycling where she quickly gained gold medals.

Boyd rode the team pursuit at the 2008–2009 UCI Track Cycling World Cup Classics with Alison Shanks and Lauren Ellis in Beijing, in a time of 3:28.044, becoming the fastest qualifiers. They went on to take the gold medal in a time of 3:24.421, setting the second fastest time in the world behind the 3:22.425 world record set by Great Britain at Manchester in 2008.

At the 2011 UCI Track Cycling World Championships she won bronze in the team pursuit.

In 2008 and 2009 she competed in many international road races. In 2009, she was in the Italian cycling team Selle Italia Ghezzi and finished 5th in La Route de France. In 2008 and 2010 she was 3rd in the New Zealand National Road Race Championships.
