= Josie Tomic =

Australian cyclist

Josephine Tomic
Personal information
- Full name: Josephine Mills Bobridge
- Nickname: Josie
- Born: 9 June 1989 (age 37) Subiaco, Western Australia
- Height: 175 cm (5 ft 9 in)

Cycling career
- Sport: Cycling
- Discipline: Track - Team Pursuit
- Role: Rider
- Rider type: Endurance

Amateur team
- Northern Districts Cycle Club

Professional team
- Lotto-Belisol Ladies Team
Medal record
Representing Australia
Women's track cycling
World Championships
Gold medal – first place	2009 Pruszków	Omnium
Gold medal – first place	2010 Ballerup	Team Pursuit
Silver medal – second place	2012 Melbourne	Team pursuit
Bronze medal – third place	2009 Pruszków	Team Pursuit

Josephine Tomic (born 9 June 1989) is a former Australian track cyclist. She was selected to represent Australia at the 2012 Summer Olympics in the Team Pursuit.

== Personal ==
Nicknamed Josie, Tomic was born on 9 June 1989 in Subiaco, Western Australia. She attended North Perth Primary School, Como Primary School and Perth College. She started at Murdoch University in 2008 and was enrolled as of 2012, and was pursuing a Bachelor of Primary Education.

== Cycling ==
Tomic is a road and track cyclist specialising in the team pursuit event. She started road cycling when she was fourteen years old. She represented her country for the first time only a year later in 2004, competing in the Oceania championships. She won 5 national titles in the under 17 category between 2004 and 2005, and added an under 19 title to her palmarès in 2007. She has been coached by Gary Sutton since 2005. She is also coached by Darryl Benson. Her primary training base is in Adelaide, with a secondary training base in Perth, Western Australia. She is a member of Northern Districts Cycle Club. She is a member of the professional cycling team Team Jayco-AIS. She has a cycling scholarship with Western Australian Institute of Sport and Australian Institute of Sport.

Tomic competed at the Junior World Championships in 2006 and 2007. In 2007, Tomic set a world record in the 2000m pursuit in the under-19 age category. She also claimed three junior world titles. In 2008, she won her first senior national title, with a first-place finish in the 3000m individual pursuit with a time of 3:41.953. In November 2008, Tomic made an appearance at round 2 of the 2008–2009 UCI Track Cycling World Cup Classics in Melbourne, where she won silver in both the individual and team pursuit. On her senior World Championship debut on 28 March 2009, Tomic won the gold medal in the Omnium, the first time the competition had been included for women in the World Championships. She also won the bronze medal as a member of Australia's Team Pursuit squad. At the 2010 World Cup at Melbourne's Hisense Arena, she was part of an Australian team that won the country's first gold at the event. The medal was in the 3000m team pursuit. At the 2010 Commonwealth Games, she competed in the individual pursuit event where she finished fifth and in the points race where she finished tenth. She finished 4th in the team pursuit at the 2011 Track World Championships in Apeldoorn, Netherlands. She finished 1st in the individual pursuit at the 2011 Australian Track Championships in Sydney. She finished second in the team pursuit at the 2012 Track World Championships in Melbourne, Australia. She finished first in the team pursuit and 3rd in the individual pursuit at the 2012 Australian Championships in Adelaide. In the team pursuit event at the 2012 Summer Olympics Test Event in London, her team set the fastest time in the event on the opening day of the competition. Tomic was selected to represent Australia at the 2012 Summer Olympics in the Team Pursuit event. She was a member of the Australian track cycling team pursuit team that finished in fourth place at the 2012 Summer Olympics.

== Palmarès ==
2004
1st U17 Individual Pursuit, Australian National Track Championships
1st New Zealand Oceania Tour
2nd U17 Australian National Duo Time Trial Championships
3rd U17 Australian National Time Trial Championships
3rd U17 Australian National Road Race Championships

2005
1st U17 Individual Pursuit, Australian National Track Championships
1st U17 500 m TT, Australian National Track Championships
1st U17 Team Sprint, Australian National Track Championships
1st U17 Australian National Duo Time Trial Championships
1st U17 Australian National Time Trial Championships
2nd U17 Team Sprint, Australian National Track Championships
2nd U17 Australian National Criterium Championships
3rd U17 Australian National Road Race Championships

2006
1st U19 Australian National Road Time Trial Series
2nd U19 Points Race, Australian National Track Championships
2nd U19 Scratch Race, Australian National Track Championships
3rd U19 Individual Pursuit, Australian National Track Championships

2007
1st Individual Pursuit, Junior Track World Championships (World Record)
1st Points Race, Junior Track World Championships
1st Time Trial, Junior Road World Championships
1st U19 Individual Pursuit, Australian National Track Championships
1st U19 Points Race, Australian National Track Championships
2nd U19 Scratch Race, Australian National Track Championships

2008
1st Individual Pursuit, Australian National Track Championships
1st Team Pursuit, Australian National Track Championships
3rd Points Race, Australian National Track Championships
2nd Individual Pursuit, Round 2, 2008–2009 Track World Cup, Melbourne
2nd Team Pursuit, Round 2, 2008–2009 Track World Cup, Melbourne
1st Overall Tour de Perth

2009
1st Omnium, Track World Championships
3rd Team Pursuit, Track World Championships
5th Individual Pursuit, Track World Championships
1st Individual Pursuit, Oceania Championships
1st Team Pursuit, Oceania Championships
1st Individual Pursuit, Australian National Track Championships
1st Omnium, Australian National Track Championships
1st Team Pursuit, Australian National Track Championships
1st U23 Australian National Time Trial Championships
2nd Overall Jayco Bay Criterium Series
3rd Team Pursuit, UCI Track World Championships
2nd Individual Pursuit, 2009–2010 UCI Track Cycling World Cup Classics
3rd, Team pursuit, 2009–2010 Track World Cup, Manchester
3rd, Team pursuit, 2009–2010 Track World Cup, Melbourne

2010
1st Teams Pursuit 2010/11 UCI Track World Cup – Melbourne Round AUS
1st Teams Pursuit 2011 Oceania Track Championships SA
1st Teams Pursuit Australian Track Championships SA
1st Teams Pursuit UCI Track World Championships DEN
2nd Omnium Australian Track Championships SA
3rd Individual Pursuit Australian Track Championships SA
4th Scratch Race Australian Track Championships SA
7th Time Trial Australian Track Championships SA
10th Points Race Commonwealth Games IN

2012
3rd Team Pursuit, 2011–2012 UCI Track Cycling World Cup Classics in London
