= Pascale Schnider =

Swiss cyclist

Personal information
- Born: 18 October 1984 (age 41) Flühli, Switzerland

Cycling career
- Sport: Cycling
- Role: Rider (road and track)

Professional teams
- 2006–2009: Cervelo-Lifeforce Pro Cycling Team
- 2010–2011: bike-import.ch
- 2012: Exergy Twenty12

Pascale Schnider (born 18 October 1984 in Flühli) is a Swiss road and track racing cyclist. She was the Swiss National Road Race champion in 2011.

== Palmares ==
2005

- 3rd in National Championship, Road, ITT, Elite
- 1st in European Championship, Track, Scratch, U23
- 3rd in European Championship, Track, Pursuit, U23

2006

- 2nd in National Championship, Road, ITT, Elite
- 2nd in European Championship, Track, Pursuit, U23

2007

- 3rd in National Championship, Road, ITT

2008

- 2nd in National Championship, Road
- 1st in Road World Cup 2008 Open de Suede Vargarda TTT

2009 – Cervélo TestTeam 2009 season
2010

11th in UCI Track Cycling World Championships, Pursuit

- 1st in National Championship, Road, ITT
- 2nd in National Championship, Road

2011

- 7th in 2011 UCI Track Cycling World Championships, Pursuit
- 1st in National Championship, Track, Omnium
- 1st in National Championship, Road, ITT
- 1st in National Championship, Road
- 19th in 2011 UCI Road World Championships, Women's time trial
