= Lesya Kalytovska =

Ukrainian racing cyclist

Personal information
- Full name: Lesya Mykhailivna Kalytovska
- Born: 13 February 1988 (age 38) Lviv Oblast, Ukrainian SSR, Soviet Union

Cycling career
- Sport: Cycling
- Disciplines: Road and track
- Role: Rider
Medal record
Representing Ukraine
Women's track cycling
Olympic Games
Bronze medal – third place	2008 Beijing	Individual pursuit
World Championships
Silver medal – second place	2008 Manchester	Team pursuit
Universiade
Silver medal – second place	2011 Shenzhen	Individual pursuit

Lesya Mykhailivna Kalytovska (Ukrainian: Леся Михайлівнаborn Калитовська; 13 February 1988 in Lviv Oblast, Soviet Union) is a Ukrainian professional racing cyclist. At the 2008 Summer Olympics, she competed in the women's points race, and the women's individual pursuit, winning a bronze medal in the later. At the 2012 Summer Olympics, she competed in the Women's team pursuit for the national team.

== Career highlights ==
2005
3rd, European Championship, Road, ITT, Juniors, Moscow
1st, European Championship, Track, Pursuit, Juniors, Fiorenzuola
1st, World Championship, Track, Pursuit, Juniors, Wien
2006
1st, European Championship, Track, Pursuit, Juniors, Athens
1st, World Championship, Track, Pursuit, Juniors, Ghent
2nd, World Championship, Road, ITT, Juniors, Spa-Francorchamps
2nd, World Cup, Track, Scratch, Moscow
2007
1st, European Championship, Track, Pursuit, U23, Cottbus
3rd, World Cup, Track, Team Pursuit, Sydney
1st, World Cup, Track, Team Pursuit, Beijing
2008
1st, World Cup, Track, Pursuit, Los Angeles
1st, World Cup, Track, Team Pursuit, Los Angeles
2nd, European championships, road race, Under 23
3rd, European championships, time trial, Under 23
Olympic Bronze medal, Individual Pursuit, Beijing
2nd Team Pursuit, 2008 UCI Track Cycling World Championships
2009
3rd Individual pursuit, Track Cycling World Cup, Melbourne
UEC European U23 Track Championships

1st Team Pursuit (with Svitlana Galyuk and Anna Nagirna)
2nd Individual Pursuit
3rd Points Race

2010
3rd Individual pursuit, Track Cycling World Cup, Beijing
