= Vilija Sereikaitė =

Lithuanian racing cyclist (born 1987)

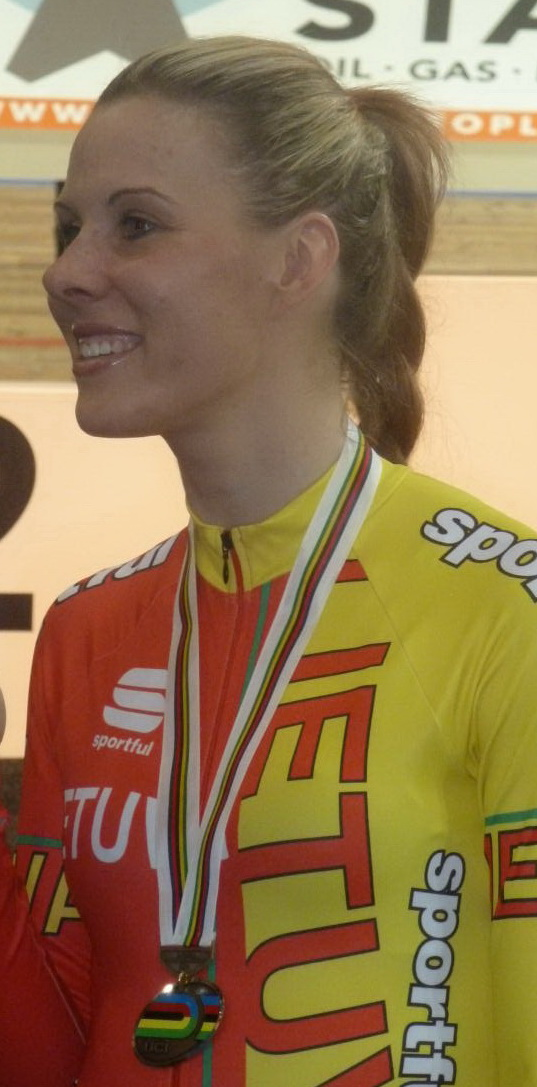

Personal information
- Full name: Vilija Sereikaitė
- Born: 12 February 1987 (age 39) Panevėžys, Lithuania
- Height: 1.74 m (5 ft 9 in)
- Weight: 62 kg (137 lb; 9.8 st)

Cycling career
- Sport: Cycling
- Current team: Safi-Pasta Zara
- Disciplines: Road and track
- Role: Rider
- Rider type: Track: pursuiter

Professional team
- 2007–: Safi-Pasta Zara-Manhattan
Medal record
Representing Lithuania
Women's track cycling
World Championships
Bronze medal – third place	2009 Pruszków	Individual pursuit
Bronze medal – third place	2010 Ballerup	Individual pursuit
Bronze medal – third place	2011 Apeldoorn	Individual pursuit
European Championships
Gold medal – first place	2012 Panevėžys	Team pursuit
Silver medal – second place	2010 Pruszków	Team Pursuit
Bronze medal – third place	2014 Baie-Mahault	Individual pursuit
Universiade
Gold medal – first place	2011 Shenzhen	Individual pursuit

Vilija Sereikaitė (born 12 February 1987 in Panevėžys) is a Lithuanian racing cyclist. At the 2009, 2010 and 2011 UCI Track Cycling World Championships, Sereikaitė won the bronze medal in the individual pursuit.

== Palmarès ==
=== Track ===
2006
3rd Individual Pursuit, Track World Cup Sydney
2007
2nd Individual Pursuit, Track World Cup Sydney
2008
1st Individual Pursuit, UEC European U23 Track Championships
Track World Cup

1st Individual pursuit - Cali

2nd Individual pursuit - Ballerup
2009
Track World Cup

2nd Individual Pursuit, Beijing
3rd Individual Pursuit Cali
3rd Team Pursuit Cali

3rd, Individual Pursuit World Championships
1st Individual Pursuit, UEC European U23 Track Championships
2010
Track World Cup

2nd Individual Pursuit, Beijing

3rd Individual Pursuit, World Championships
2011
1st Individual pursuit, Universiade
3rd Individual Pursuit, World Championships
2013
2nd Sprint, Panevezys
2014
3rd Individual Pursuit, UEC European Track Championships
3rd Individual Pursuit, Panevezys
2015
2nd Individual Pursuit, Panevezys

=== Road ===
Date	Placing	Event	Competition	Location	Country
24 June 2009	2	Individual time trial	National championship	Ignalina	Lithuania
