= 2010 European Track Championships – Women's team pursuit =

UEC European Champion jersey

The Women's Team Pursuit was one of the 5 women's events at the 2010 European Track Championships, held in Pruszków, Poland.

Fourteen teams of 3 cyclists each participated in the contest. After the qualifying, the fastest 2 teams raced for gold, and 3rd and 4th teams raced for bronze.

The Qualifying and the Finals were held on November 5.

== World record ==
World Record
| WR | 3:21.552 | New Zealand | (Denmark) Copenhagen | 25 March 2010 |

== Qualifying ==
Fastest 2 teams race for gold and 3rd and 4th teams race for bronze.

| Rank | Name | Nation | Time | Notes |
|---|---|---|---|---|
| 1 | Katie Colclough; Wendy Houvenaghel; Laura Trott | Great Britain | 3:24.916 | Q |
| 2 | Vaida Pikauskaitė; Vilija Sereikaitė; Aušrinė Trebaitė | Lithuania | 3:28.011 | Q |
| 3 | Irina Kruchkova; Aksana Papko; Tatsiana Sharakova | Belarus | 3:28.534 | q |
| 4 | Lisa Brennauer; Verena Jooss; Madeleine Sandig | Germany | 3:28.720 | q |
| 5 | Jessie Daams; Jolien D'Hoore; Kelly Druyts | Belgium | 3:29.630 | |
| 6 | Edyta Jasińska; Katarzyna Pawłowska; Małgorzata Wojtyra | Poland | 3:29.870 | |
| 7 | Anastasia Chulkova; Victoria Kondel; Evgenia Romanyuta | Russia | 3:30.558 | |
| 8 | Svitlana Halyuk; Lesya Kalytovska; Hanna Solovey | Ukraine | 3:31.203 | |
| 9 | Amy Pieters; Laura van der Kamp; Ellen van Dijk | Netherlands | 3:31.903 | |
| 10 | Leire Olaberria; Gloria Rodríguez; Ana Usabiaga | Spain | 3:33.438 | |
| 11 | Sophie Creux; Fiona Dutriaux; Pascale Jeuland | France | 3:35.189 | |
| 12 | Ciara Horne; Jennifer O'Reilly; Caroline Ryan | Ireland | 3:37.072 | |
| 13 | Rossella Callovi; Giulia Donato; Tatiana Guderzo | Italy | 3:39.380 | |
| 14 | Dagmar Labáková; Jarmila Machačová; Lucie Záleská | Czech Republic | 3:39.750 | |

== Finals ==
| Rank | Name | Nation | Time |
|---|---|---|---|
Gold Medal Race
| 1st place, gold medalist(s) | Katie Colclough; Wendy Houvenaghel; Laura Trott | Great Britain | 3:23.435 |
| 2nd place, silver medalist(s) | Vaida Pikauskaitė; Vilija Sereikaitė; Aušrinė Trebaitė | Lithuania | 3.29.992 |
Bronze Medal Race
| 3rd place, bronze medalist(s) | Lisa Brennauer; Verena Jooss; Madeleine Sandig | Germany | 3:28.127 |
| 4 | Irina Kruchkova; Aksana Papko; Tatsiana Sharakova | Belarus | 3:28.410 |
