= 2010 European Track Championships (under-23 & junior) =

- Venue: Saint Petersburg, Russia
- Date(s): 10–15 September 2010
- Events: 38

The 2010 European Track Championships were the European Championships for track cycling. The junior and under 23 riders events took place in Saint Petersburg, Russia from 10 to 15 September 2010.

== Medal summary ==
=== Under 23 ===
| Event | Gold | | Silver | | Bronze | |
|---|---|---|---|---|---|---|
Men's events
| Men's under-23 sprint | Tobias Wächter; Germany | | Philipp Thiele; Germany | | Peter Mitchell; Great Britain | |
| Men's under-23 1 km time trial | Quentin Lafargue; France | 1:02.700 | Joachim Eilers; Germany | 1:02.820 | Nikolay Zhurkin; Russia | 1:03.685 |
| Men's under-23 individual pursuit | Valery Kaykov; Russia | 4:28.826 | Artur Ershov; Russia | 4:30.127 | Marco Coledan; Italy | 4:28.847 |
| Men's under-23 team pursuit | Sergey Chernetskiy; Valery Kaykov; Artur Ershov; Sergey Shilov; Russia | 4:05.550 | Johannes Kahra; Theo Reinhardt; Jakob Steigmiller; Lucas Liss; Germany | 4:09.956 | Vivien Brisse; Julien Duval; Nicolas Giulia; Julien Morice; France | 4:10.180 |
| Men's under-23 team sprint | Joachim Eilers; Philipp Thiele; Tobias Wächter; Germany | 44.946 | Kirill Filatov; Vladimir Khozov; Denis Shurshin; Russia | 45.650 | Grzegorz Drejgier; Rafal Sarnecki; Adrian Tekliński; Poland | 45.870 |
| Men's under-23 keirin | Joachim Eilers; Germany | | Quentin Lafargue; France | | Denis Špička; Czech Republic | |
| Men's under-23 scratch race | Sebastián Mora; Spain | | Ralf Matzka; Germany | -1 lap | Sergey Shilov; Russia | -1 lap |
| Men's under-23 points race | Artur Ershov; Russia | 101 pts | Jan Keller; Switzerland | 83 pts | Omar Bertazzo; Italy | 66 pts |
| U23 Men's Madison | Airán Fernández; Sebastián Mora; Spain | 8 pts | Jochen Deweer; Tosh Van der Sande; Belgium | 15 pts (-1 lap) | Ralf Matzka; Theo Reinhardt; Germany | 5 pts (-1 lap) |
| U23 Men's Omnium | Jan Dostal; Czech Republic | 23 pts | Gijs Van Hoecke; Belgium | 25 pts | Grzegorz Stępniak; Poland | 26 pts |
Women's events
| Women's under-23 sprint | Becky James; Great Britain | | Virginie Cueff; France | | Sandie Clair; France | |
| Women's under-23 500 m time trial | Sandie Clair; France | 34.488 | Becky James; Great Britain | 35.307 | Virginie Cueff; France | 35.598 |
| Women's under-23 individual pursuit | Aksana Papko; Belarus | 3:42.301 | Lucie Záleská; Czech Republic | 3:49.762 | Vaida Pikauskaitė; Lithuania | 3:44.871 |
| Women's under-23 team pursuit | Jessie Daams; Jolien D'Hoore; Kelly Druyts; Belgium | 3:28.313 | Renata Dąbrowska; Katarzyna Pawłowska; Małgorzata Wojtyra; Poland | 3:34.682 | Alfiya Khabibulina; Elena Lichmanova; Irina Molicheva; Russia | 3:34.574 |
| Women's under-23 team sprint | Sandie Clair; Virginie Cueff; France | 34.388 | Becky James; Victoria Williamson; Great Britain | 35.436 | Victoria Baranova; Anastasia Voinova; Russia | 35.106 |
| Women's under-23 keirin | Sandie Clair; France | | Virginie Cueff; France | | Charlene Delev; Germany | |
| Women's under-23 scratch race | Renata Dąbrowska; Poland | | Kelly Druyts; Belgium | | Evgenia Romanyuta; Russia | |
| Women's under-23 points race | Aksana Papko; Belarus | 38 pts | Marta Tagliaferro; Italy | 32 pts | Jolien D'Hoore; Belgium | 31 pts |
| U23 Women's Omnium | Jolien D'Hoore; Belgium | 13 pts | Małgorzata Wojtyra; Poland | 13 pts | Aksana Papko; Belarus | 25 pts |

=== Junior ===
| Event | Gold | | Silver | | Bronze | |
|---|---|---|---|---|---|---|
Men's events
| Junior Men's Sprint | Julien Palma; France | | Rino Gasparrini; Italy | | Philipp Hindes; Germany | |
| Junior Men's 1 km Time Trial | Julien Palma; France | 1:04.621 | Rino Gasparrini; Italy | 1:04.637 | Robert Kanter; Germany | 1:05.578 |
| Junior Men's Individual Pursuit | Viktor Manakov; Russia | 3:21.573 | Evgeny Shalunov; Russia | 3:25.054 | Filippo Ranzi; Italy | 3:25.456 |
| Junior Men's Team Pursuit | Roman Ivlev; Pavel Karpenkov; Evgeny Shalunov; Kirill Sveshnikov; Russia | 4:12.779 | Liam Bertazzo; Filippo Ranzi; Michele Scartezzini; Paolo Simion; Italy | 4:17.588 | Bryan Coquard; Alexis Gougeard; Marc Sarreau; Romain Le Roux; France | 4:18.606 |
| Junior Men's Team Sprint | Kévin Guillot; Julien Palma; Benjamin Edelin; France | 46.884 | Mauro Catellini; Davide Ceci; Rino Gasparrini; Italy | 47.222 | Nikita Balunov; Dmitry Gorlov; Kirill Samusenko; Russia | 46.796 |
| Junior Men's Keirin | Benjamin Edelin; France | | Kévin Guillot; France | | Nikita Balunov; Russia | |
| Junior Men's Scratch | Romain Le Roux; France | | Michele Scartezzini; Italy | | Bryan Coquard; France | -1 lap |
| Junior Men's Points Race | Michele Scartezzini; Italy | 70 pts | Kirill Sveshnikov; Russia | 63 pts | Roman Ivlev; Russia | 58 pts |
| Junior Men's Madison | Andriy Sokolov; Oleksandr Lobov; Ukraine | 6 pts | Roman Ivlev; Kirill Sveshnikov; Russia | 17 pts (-1 lap) | Bryan Coquard; Romain Le Roux; France | 14 pts (-1 lap) |
| Junior Men's Omnium | Paolo Simion; Italy | 20 pts | Lucas Liss; Germany | 21 pts | Viktor Manakov; Russia | 26 pts |
Women's events
| Junior Women's Sprint | Ekaterina Gnidenko; Russia | | Victoria Williamson; Great Britain | | Stella Tomassini; Italy | |
| Junior Women's 500 m Time Trial | Tania Calvo; Spain | 36.057 | Anastasia Voinova; Russia | 36.237 | Ekaterina Gnidenko; Russia | 36.780 |
| Junior Women's Individual Pursuit | Alexandra Chekina; Russia | 2:31.856 | Svetlana Kashirina; Russia | 2:35.868 | Karolina Karasiewicz; Poland | 2:32.979 |
| Junior Women's Team Pursuit | Alexandra Goncharova; Svetlana Kashirina; Alexandra Chekina; Russia | 3:38.168 | Elena Cecchini; Maria Giulia Confalonieri; Chiara Vannucci; Italy | 3:39:504 | | |
| Junior Women's Team Sprint | Ekaterina Gnidenko; Anastasia Voinova; Russia | 35.562 | Charlott Arndt; Christina Konsulke; Germany | 36.239 | Sara Consolati; Giulia Donato; Italy | 36.380 |
| Junior Women's Keirin | Anastasia Voinova; Russia | | Victoria Williamson; Great Britain | | Tania Calvo; Spain | |
| Junior Women's Scratch | Alexandra Goncharova; Russia | | Giulia Donato; Italy | | Sara Consolati; Italy | |
| Junior Women's Points Race | Elena Cecchini; Italy | 27 pts | Svetlana Kashirina; Russia | 13 pts | Alexandra Goncharova; Poland | 11 pts |
| Junior Women's Omnium | Chiara Vannucci; Italy | 13 pts | Alexandra Goncharova; Russia | 13 pts | Dagmar Labakova; Czech Republic | 17 pts |

== Medal table ==
| Rank | Nation | Gold | Silver | Bronze | Total |
|---|---|---|---|---|---|
| 1 | RUS | 11 | 9 | 10 | 30 |
| 2 | FRA | 9 | 4 | 6 | 19 |
| 3 | ITA | 4 | 8 | 6 | 18 |
| 4 | GER | 3 | 6 | 4 | 13 |
| 5 | ESP | 3 | 0 | 1 | 4 |
| 6 | BEL | 2 | 3 | 1 | 6 |
| 7 | BLR | 2 | 0 | 1 | 3 |
| 8 | GBR | 1 | 4 | 1 | 6 |
| 9 | POL | 1 | 2 | 4 | 7 |
| 10 | CZE | 1 | 1 | 2 | 4 |
| 11 | UKR | 1 | 0 | 0 | 1 |
| 12 | SUI | 0 | 1 | 0 | 1 |
| 13 | LTU | 0 | 0 | 1 | 1 |
| Totals (13 entries) | | 38 | 38 | 37 | 113 |
