= 2015 UEC European Track Championships – Women's omnium =

Women's omnium at the 2015 UEC European Track Championships
- UEC European Champion jersey
- Venue: Velodrome Suisse, Grenchen
- Date: 17–18 October
- Competitors: 19 from 19 nations

Medalists
gold medal	Laura Trott	Great Britain
silver medal	Amalie Dideriksen	Denmark
bronze medal	Aušrinė Trebaitė	Lithuania

The Women's omnium was held on 17–18 October 2015. 19 riders competed across six events.

== Results ==
=== Scratch race ===
Standings after 1 event.

Rank	Name	Nation	Laps down	Event points
1	Aušrinė Trebaitė	Lithuania		40
2	Laura Trott	Great Britain	-1	38
3	Laurie Berthon	France	-1	36
4	Kirsten Wild	Netherlands	-1	34
5	Anna Knauer	Germany	-1	32
6	Amalie Dideriksen	Denmark	-1	30
7	Gulnaz Badykova	Russia	-1	28
8	Leire Olaberria	Spain	-1	26
9	Lucie Hochmann	Czech Republic	-1	24
10	Anita Stenberg	Norway	-1	22
11	Lotte Kopecky	Belgium	-1	20
12	Tetyana Klimchenko	Ukraine	-1	18
13	Simona Frapporti	Italy	-1	16
14	Małgorzata Wojtyra	Poland	-1	14
15	Tatsiana Sharakova	Belarus	-1	12
16	Lydia Boylan	Ireland	-1	10
17	Virginie Pointet	Switzerland	-1	8
18	Pia Pensaari	Finland	-1	6
19	Eleni Michalitsa Tsavari	Greece	-1	4

=== Individual pursuit ===
Standings after 2 events.

Rank	Name	Nation	Time	Event points	Overall rank	Subtotal
1	Laura Trott	Great Britain	3:32.699	40	1	78
2	Amalie Dideriksen	Denmark	3:33.833	38	3	68
3	Kirsten Wild	Netherlands	3:34.900	36	2	70
4	Małgorzata Wojtyra	Poland	3:37.232	34	9	48
5	Tatsiana Sharakova	Belarus	3:39.120	32	12	44
6	Gulnaz Badykova	Russia	3:39.349	30	6	58
7	Lotte Kopecky	Belgium	3:39.484	28	10	48
8	Laurie Berthon	France	3:40.342	26	4	62
9	Leire Olaberria	Spain	3:40.869	24	7	50
10	Lucie Hochmann	Czech Republic	3:40.999	22	11	46
11	Aušrinė Trebaitė	Lithuania	3:42.768	20	5	60
12	Anna Knauer	Germany	3:42.915	18	8	50
13	Simona Frapporti	Italy	3:43.157	16	14	32
14	Lydia Boylan	Ireland	3:45.223	14	16	24
15	Anita Stenberg	Norway	3:46.706	12	13	34
16	Tetyana Klimchenko	Ukraine	3:47.105	10	15	28
17	Virginie Pointet	Switzerland	3:51.566	8	17	16
18	Eleni Michalitsa Tsavari	Greece	3:57.158	6	18	10
19	Pia Pensaari	Finland	3:59.386	4	19	10

=== Elimination race ===
Standings after 3 events.

Rank	Name	Nation	Event points	Overall rank	Subtotal
1	Laura Trott	Great Britain	40	1	118
2	Amalie Dideriksen	Denmark	38	2	106
3	Gulnaz Badykova	Russia	36	3	94
4	Simona Frapporti	Italy	34	12	66
5	Leire Olaberria	Spain	32	5	82
6	Małgorzata Wojtyra	Poland	30	8	78
7	Anna Knauer	Germany	28	9	78
8	Lotte Kopecky	Belgium	26	10	74
9	Lucie Hochmann	Czech Republic	24	11	70
10	Tatsiana Sharakova	Belarus	22	13	66
11	Aušrinė Trebaitė	Lithuania	20	6	80
12	Laurie Berthon	France	18	7	80
13	Kirsten Wild	Netherlands	16	4	86
14	Anita Stenberg	Norway	14	14	48
15	Tetyana Klimchenko	Ukraine	12	15	40
16	Lydia Boylan	Ireland	10	16	34
17	Virginie Pointet	Switzerland	8	17	24
18	Pia Pensaari	Finland	6	18	16
19	Eleni Michalitsa Tsavari	Greece	4	19	14

=== 500m time trial ===
Standings after 4 events.

Rank	Name	Nation	Time	Event points	Overall rank	Subtotal
1	Laurie Berthon	France	35.313	40	3	120
2	Laura Trott	Great Britain	35.394	38	1	156
3	Małgorzata Wojtyra	Poland	35.491	36	5	114
4	Leire Olaberria	Spain	36.119	34	4	116
5	Anna Knauer	Germany	36.218	32	6	110
6	Aušrinė Trebaitė	Lithuania	36.489	30	7	110
7	Simona Frapporti	Italy	36.565	28	10	94
8	Amalie Dideriksen	Denmark	36.621	26	2	132
9	Lydia Boylan	Ireland	36.628	24	15	58
10	Kirsten Wild	Netherlands	36.845	22	9	108
11	Tatsiana Sharakova	Belarus	36.881	20	12	86
12	Lucie Hochmann	Czech Republic	37.005	18	11	88
13	Gulnaz Badykova	Russia	37.526	16	8	110
14	Anita Stenberg	Norway	37.571	14	14	62
15	Virginie Pointet	Switzerland	37.753	12	17	36
16	Tetyana Klimchenko	Ukraine	37.878	10	16	50
17	Lotte Kopecky	Belgium	37.884	8	13	82
18	Pia Pensaari	Finland	38.853	6	18	22
19	Eleni Michalitsa Tsavari	Greece	39.631	4	19	18

=== Flying lap ===
Standings after 5 events.

Rank	Name	Nation	Time	Event points	Overall rank	Subtotal
1	Laura Trott	Great Britain	14.068	40	1	196
2	Laurie Berthon	France	14.159	38	3	158
3	Małgorzata Wojtyra	Poland	14.310	36	4	150
4	Kirsten Wild	Netherlands	14.331	34	5	142
5	Anna Knauer	Germany	14.421	32	6	142
6	Amalie Dideriksen	Denmark	14.448	30	2	162
7	Tatsiana Sharakova	Belarus	14.570	28	10	114
8	Lydia Boylan	Ireland	14.589	26	14	84
9	Leire Olaberria	Spain	14.644	24	7	140
10	Aušrinė Trebaitė	Lithuania	14.706	22	8	132
11	Simona Frapporti	Italy	14.766	20	11	114
12	Tetyana Klimchenko	Ukraine	14.773	18	16	68
13	Lucie Hochmann	Czech Republic	14.833	16	12	104
14	Gulnaz Badykova	Russia	14.993	14	9	124
15	Anita Stenberg	Norway	15.031	12	15	74
16	Lotte Kopecky	Belgium	15.072	10	13	92
17	Virginie Pointet	Switzerland	15.598	8	17	44
18	Pia Pensaari	Finland	15.913	6	18	28
19	Eleni Michalitsa Tsavari	Greece	16.070	4	19	22

=== Points race and final standings ===
Riders' points from the previous 5 events were carried into the points race, in which the final standings were decided.

Overall rank	Name	Nation	Subtotal	Sprint points	Lap points	Finish order	Final standings
1st place, gold medalist(s)	Laura Trott	Great Britain	196	15	20	1	231
2nd place, silver medalist(s)	Amalie Dideriksen	Denmark	162	13	20	13	195
3rd place, bronze medalist(s)	Aušrinė Trebaitė	Lithuania	132	13	40	14	185
4	Laurie Berthon	France	158	0	0	10	158
5	Małgorzata Wojtyra	Poland	150	5	0	2	155
6	Simona Frapporti	Italy	114	20	20	12	154
7	Anna Knauer	Germany	142	4	0	17	146
8	Kirsten Wild	Netherlands	142	3	0	8	145
9	Tatsiana Sharakova	Belarus	114	9	20	11	143
10	Leire Olaberria	Spain	140	0	0	9	140
11	Gulnaz Badykova	Russia	124	3	0	4	127
12	Lotte Kopecky	Belgium	92	10	0	3	102
13	Anita Stenberg	Norway	74	11	0	5	85
14	Lucie Hochmann	Czech Republic	104	0	-20	16	84
15	Tetyana Klimchenko	Ukraine	68	0	0	7	68
16	Lydia Boylan	Ireland	84	4	-20	15	68
17	Eleni Michalitsa Tsavari	Greece	22	0	0	6	22
18	Virginie Pointet	Switzerland	44	0	-60	—	-16
19	Pia Pensaari	Finland	28	0	-60	—	-72
