= 2014 UEC European Track Championships – Women's omnium =

Women's omnium at the 2014 UEC European Track Championships
- UEC European Champion jersey
- Venue: Vélodrome Amédée Détraux, Baie-Mahault
- Date: 18–19 October
- Competitors: 17 from 17 nations

Medalists
gold medal	Laura Trott	Great Britain
silver medal	Jolien D'Hoore	Belgium
bronze medal	Anna Knauer	Germany

The Women's omnium was held on 18–19 October 2014. 17 riders competed across six events.

== Results ==
=== Scratch race ===
Standings after 1 event.

Rank	Name	Nation	Laps down	Event points
1	Małgorzata Wojtyra	Poland		40
2	Jolien D'Hoore	Belgium	-1	38
3	Kirsten Wild	Netherlands	-1	36
4	Laura Trott	Great Britain	-1	34
5	Laurie Berthon	France	-1	32
6	Lucie Záleská	Czech Republic	-1	30
7	Caroline Ryan	Ireland	-1	28
8	Anna Knauer	Germany	-1	26
9	Simona Frapporti	Italy	-1	24
10	Alžbeta Pavlendová	Slovakia	-1	22
11	Tetyana Klimchenko	Ukraine	-1	20
12	Amalie Dideriksen	Denmark	-1	18
13	Ana Usabiaga	Spain	-1	16
14	Tatsiana Sharakova	Belarus	-1	14
15	Aušrinė Trebaitė	Lithuania	-1	12
16	Sara Ferrara	Finland	-1	10
17	Evgenia Romanyuta	Russia	-1	8

=== Individual pursuit ===
Standings after 2 events.

Rank	Name	Nation	Time	Event points	Overall rank	Subtotal
1	Tatsiana Sharakova	Belarus	3:47.104	40	7	54
2	Kirsten Wild	Netherlands	3:48.064	38	1	74
3	Jolien D'Hoore	Belgium	3:50.811	36	2	74
4	Laura Trott	Great Britain	3:51.203	34	3	68
5	Aušrinė Trebaitė	Lithuania	3:52.546	32	11	44
6	Anna Knauer	Germany	3:53.594	30	5	56
7	Caroline Ryan	Ireland	3:54.698	28	6	56
8	Simona Frapporti	Italy	3:55.078	26	9	50
9	Lucie Záleská	Czech Republic	3:57.978	24	8	54
10	Evgenia Romanyuta	Russia	3:58.846	22	15	30
11	Amalie Dideriksen	Denmark	3:59.157	20	12	38
12	Małgorzata Wojtyra	Poland	4:04.354	18	4	58
13	Laurie Berthon	France	4:09.219	16	10	48
14	Tetyana Klimchenko	Ukraine	4:09.438	14	13	34
15	Ana Usabiaga	Spain	4:10.598	12	16	28
16	Sara Ferrara	Finland	4:13.714	10	17	18
17	Alžbeta Pavlendová	Slovakia	4:17.984	8	14	32

=== Elimination race ===
Standings after 3 events.

Rank	Name	Nation	Event points	Overall rank	Subtotal
1	Laura Trott	Great Britain	40	3	108
2	Jolien D'Hoore	Belgium	38	1	112
3	Laurie Berthon	France	36	5	84
4	Kirsten Wild	Netherlands	34	2	108
5	Evgenia Romanyuta	Russia	32	11	62
6	Małgorzata Wojtyra	Poland	30	4	88
7	Simona Frapporti	Italy	28	7	78
8	Anna Knauer	Germany	26	6	82
9	Amalie Dideriksen	Denmark	24	12	62
10	Tatsiana Sharakova	Belarus	22	8	76
11	Ana Usabiaga	Spain	20	14	48
12	Lucie Záleská	Czech Republic	18	9	72
13	Alžbeta Pavlendová	Slovakia	16	15	48
14	Aušrinė Trebaitė	Lithuania	14	13	58
15	Sara Ferrara	Finland	12	17	30
16	Caroline Ryan	Ireland	10	10	66
17	Tetyana Klimchenko	Ukraine	8	16	42

=== 500m time trial ===
Standings after 4 events.

Rank	Name	Nation	Time	Event points	Overall rank	Subtotal
1	Laura Trott	Great Britain	36.823	40	2	148
2	Jolien D'Hoore	Belgium	37.231	38	1	150
3	Małgorzata Wojtyra	Poland	37.596	36	4	124
4	Tatsiana Sharakova	Belarus	37.626	34	7	110
5	Anna Knauer	Germany	37.919	32	5	114
6	Aušrinė Trebaitė	Lithuania	37.955	30	10	88
7	Laurie Berthon	France	38.018	28	6	112
8	Evgenia Romanyuta	Russia	38.458	26	11	88
9	Simona Frapporti	Italy	38.459	24	8	102
10	Kirsten Wild	Netherlands	38.631	22	3	130
11	Lucie Záleská	Czech Republic	38.683	20	9	92
12	Amalie Dideriksen	Denmark	39.408	18	12	80
13	Sara Ferrara	Finland	39.671	16	17	46
14	Alžbeta Pavlendová	Slovakia	39.762	14	14	62
15	Ana Usabiaga	Spain	39.763	12	15	60
16	Caroline Ryan	Ireland	39.901	10	13	76
17	Tetyana Klimchenko	Ukraine	40.186	8	16	50

=== Flying lap ===
Standings after 5 events.

Rank	Name	Nation	Time	Event points	Overall rank	Subtotal
1	Laura Trott	Great Britain	19.916	40	1	188
2	Jolien D'Hoore	Belgium	20.177	38	2	188
3	Anna Knauer	Germany	20.189	36	5	150
4	Kirsten Wild	Netherlands	20.220	34	3	164
5	Małgorzata Wojtyra	Poland	20.387	32	4	156
6	Tatsiana Sharakova	Belarus	20.401	30	6	140
7	Aušrinė Trebaitė	Lithuania	20.645	28	9	116
8	Evgenia Romanyuta	Russia	20.697	26	10	114
9	Laurie Berthon	France	20.734	24	7	136
10	Simona Frapporti	Italy	20.921	22	8	124
11	Amalie Dideriksen	Denmark	20.997	20	12	100
12	Lucie Záleská	Czech Republic	21.034	18	11	110
13	Caroline Ryan	Ireland	21.399	16	13	92
14	Tetyana Klimchenko	Ukraine	21.531	14	16	64
15	Ana Usabiaga	Spain	21.532	12	14	72
16	Alžbeta Pavlendová	Slovakia	21.900	10	15	72
17	Sara Ferrara	Finland	22.007	8	17	54

=== Points race and final standings ===
Riders' points from the previous 5 events were carried into the points race, in which the final standings were decided.

Overall rank	Name	Nation	Subtotal	Sprint points	Lap points	Finish order	Final standings
1st place, gold medalist(s)	Laura Trott	Great Britain	188	11	0	1	199
2nd place, silver medalist(s)	Jolien D'Hoore	Belgium	188	10	0	2	198
3rd place, bronze medalist(s)	Anna Knauer	Germany	150	17	0	14	167
4	Kirsten Wild	Netherlands	164	2	0	13	166
5	Tatsiana Sharakova	Belarus	140	20	0	15	160
6	Małgorzata Wojtyra	Poland	156	3	0	17	159
7	Aušrinė Trebaitė	Lithuania	116	26	0	11	142
8	Laurie Berthon	France	136	3	0	5	139
9	Simona Frapporti	Italy	124	10	0	10	134
10	Evgenia Romanyuta	Russia	114	8	0	3	122
11	Lucie Záleská	Czech Republic	110	1	0	8	111
12	Amalie Dideriksen	Denmark	100	7	0	6	107
13	Caroline Ryan	Ireland	92	1	0	9	93
14	Tetyana Klimchenko	Ukraine	64	13	0	4	77
15	Ana Usabiaga	Spain	72	0	0	7	72
16	Alžbeta Pavlendová	Slovakia	72	0	0	16	72
17	Sara Ferrara	Finland	54	0	0	12	54
