= 2014 UEC European Track Championships – Women's points race =

Women's points race at the 2014 UEC European Track Championships
- UEC European Champion jersey
- Venue: Vélodrome Amédée Détraux, Baie-Mahault
- Date: 16 October
- Competitors: 28 from 17 nations

Medalists
gold medal	Eugenia Bujak	Poland
silver medal	Kelly Druyts	Belgium
bronze medal	Elena Cecchini	Italy

The Women's points race was held on 16 October 2014. 28 riders participated over a distance of 24 km (72 laps), with sprints every 6 laps awarding 5, 3, 2 or 1 point to the first four; 20 points are also awarded/withdrawn for each lap gained/lost respectively.

== Results ==
Rank	Name	Nation	Sprint points	Lap points	Finish order	Total points
1st place, gold medalist(s)	Eugenia Bujak	Poland	21	0	28	21
2nd place, silver medalist(s)	Kelly Druyts	Belgium	14	0	1	14
3rd place, bronze medalist(s)	Elena Cecchini	Italy	14	0	2	14
4	Anastasia Chulkova	Russia	12	0	3	12
5	Kirsten Wild	Netherlands	10	0	5	10
6	Stephanie Pohl	Germany	10	0	20	10
7	Alexandra Chekina	Russia	10	0	26	10
8	Ina Savenka	Belarus	9	0	18	9
9	Charlotte Becker	Germany	5	0	7	5
10	Jarmila Machačová	Czech Republic	4	0	4	4
11	Fiona Dutriaux	France	4	0	9	4
12	Maria Giulia Confalonieri	Italy	3	0	8	3
13	Amalie Dideriksen	Denmark	3	0	14	3
14	Elinor Barker	Great Britain	3	0	17	3
15	Lotte Kopecky	Belgium	3	0	21	3
16	Katie Archibald	Great Britain	3	0	25	3
17	Olena Demydova	Ukraine	2	0	10	2
18	Vaida Pikauskaitė	Lithuania	1	0	15	1
19	Daiva Tušlaitė	Lithuania	1	0	27	1
20	Alžbeta Pavlendová	Slovakia	0	0	6	0
21	Lauren Creamer	Ireland	0	0	11	0
22	Lydia Boylan	Ireland	0	0	12	0
23	Maria del Mar Bonnin	Spain	0	0	13	0
24	Gloria Rodríguez	Spain	0	0	16	0
25	Edyta Jasińska	Poland	0	0	19	0
26	Palina Pivavarava	Belarus	0	0	22	0
27	Coralie Demay	France	0	0	23	0
28	Olena Pavlukhina	Azerbaijan	0	0	24	0
