= 2010 European Track Championships – Women's omnium =

UEC European Champion jersey

The Women's omnium was one of the 5 women's cycling events at the 2010 European Track Championships, held in Pruszków, Poland.

20 cyclists participated in the contest, held on November 6.

== Flying Lap ==
Rank	Name	Nation	Time	Notes
1	Małgorzata Wojtyra	Poland	14.644	
2	Vilija Sereikaitė	Lithuania	14.737	
3	Leire Olaberria	Spain	14.843	
4	Laura Trott	Great Britain	14.937	
5	Tatsiana Sharakova	Belarus	14.979	
6	Jolien D'Hoore	Belgium	15.000	
7	Elissavet Chantzi	Greece	15.312	
8	Fiona Dutriaux	France	15.372	
9	Jarmila Machačová	Czech Republic	15.396	
10	Evgenia Romanyuta	Russia	15.427	
11	Jennifer O´Reilly	Ireland	15.468	
12	Pascale Schnider	Switzerland	15.527	
13	Ellen van Dijk	Netherlands	15.534	
14	Monia Baccaille	Italy	15.535	
15	Madeleine Sandig	Germany	15.701	
16	Elena Tchalykh	Azerbaijan	15.734	
17	Alžbeta Pavlendová	Slovakia	15.740	
18	Yelyzaveta Bochkaryova	Ukraine	16.038	

== Points race 20 km ==
Rank	Name	Nation	Laps	Points
1	Madeleine Sandig	Germany	1	35
2	Elena Tchalykh	Azerbaijan	0	18
3	Jarmila Machačová	Czech Republic	0	11
4	Leire Olaberria	Spain	0	10
5	Ellen van Dijk	Netherlands	0	9
6	Tatsiana Sharakova	Belarus	0	7
7	Pascale Schnider	Switzerland	0	5
8	Jolien D'Hoore	Belgium	0	3
9	Laura Trott	Great Britain	0	3
10	Małgorzata Wojtyra	Poland	0	2
11	Evgenia Romanyuta	Russia	0	2
12	Yelyzaveta Bochkaryova	Ukraine	0	1
13	Vilija Sereikaitė	Lithuania	0	1
14	Jennifer O´Reilly	Ireland	0	0
15	Alžbeta Pavlendová	Slovakia	0	0
16	Elissavet Chantzi	Greece	0	0
17	Fiona Dutriaux	France	-19	-1
18	Monia Baccaille	Italy	0	DNF

== Elimination race ==
Rank	Name	Nation
1	Jarmila Machačová	Czech Republic
2	Yelyzaveta Bochkaryova	Ukraine
3	Jolien D'Hoore	Belgium
4	Madeleine Sandig	Germany
5	Leire Olaberria	Spain
6	Elena Tchalykh	Azerbaijan
7	Fiona Dutriaux	France
8	Małgorzata Wojtyra	Poland
9	Tatsiana Sharakova	Belarus
10	Jennifer O´Reilly	Ireland
11	Pascale Schnider	Switzerland
12	Laura Trott	Great Britain
13	Vilija Sereikaitė	Lithuania
14	Alžbeta Pavlendová	Slovakia
15	Ellen van Dijk	Netherlands
16	Evgenia Romanyuta	Russia
17	Elissavet Chantzi	Greece
18	Monia Baccaille	Italy

== Individual Pursuit 3 km ==
Rank	Name	Nation	Time	Notes
1	Vilija Sereikaitė	Lithuania	3:34.739	
2	Leire Olaberria	Spain	3:38.695	
3	Tatsiana Sharakova	Belarus	3:39.405	
4	Laura Trott	Great Britain	3:40.587	
5	Ellen van Dijk	Netherlands	3:42.894	
6	Madeleine Sandig	Germany	3:43.415	
7	Elena Tchalykh	Azerbaijan	3:43.814	
8	Pascale Schnider	Switzerland	3:44.177	
9	Jolien D'Hoore	Belgium	3:45.460	
10	Jarmila Machačová	Czech Republic	3:47.423	
11	Jennifer O´Reilly	Ireland	3:47.725	
12	Małgorzata Wojtyra	Poland	3:47.871	
13	Evgenia Romanyuta	Russia	3:49.187	
14	Fiona Dutriaux	France	3:52.000	
15	Elissavet Chantzi	Greece	3:52.234	
16	Yelyzaveta Bochkaryova	Ukraine	3:53.227	
17	Alžbeta Pavlendová	Slovakia	4:01.264	

== Scratch race 10 km ==
Rank	Name	Nation	Laps down
1	Tatsiana Sharakova	Belarus	
2	Małgorzata Wojtyra	Poland	
3	Evgenia Romanyuta	Russia	
4	Laura Trott	Great Britain	
5	Ellen van Dijk	Netherlands	
6	Jarmila Machačová	Czech Republic	
7	Madeleine Sandig	Germany	
8	Leire Olaberria	Spain	
9	Pascale Schnider	Switzerland	
10	Jolien D'Hoore	Belgium	
11	Elena Tchalykh	Azerbaijan	
12	Jennifer O´Reilly	Ireland	
13	Yelyzaveta Bochkaryova	Ukraine	
14	Alžbeta Pavlendová	Slovakia	
15	Vilija Sereikaitė	Lithuania	
16	Fiona Dutriaux	France	
17	Elissavet Chantzi	Greece	DNF

== 500 m time trial ==
Rank	Name	Nation	Time	Notes
1	Małgorzata Wojtyra	Poland	35.885	
2	Vilija Sereikaitė	Lithuania	36.015	
3	Laura Trott	Great Britain	36.348	
4	Leire Olaberria	Spain	36.489	
5	Tatsiana Sharakova	Belarus	36.571	
6	Jolien D'Hoore	Belgium	36.670	
7	Evgenia Romanyuta	Russia	37.375	
8	Yelyzaveta Bochkaryova	Ukraine	37.948	
9	Pascale Schnider	Switzerland	37.999	
10	Fiona Dutriaux	France	38.140	
11	Jennifer O´Reilly	Ireland	38.542	
12	Ellen van Dijk	Netherlands	38.609	
13	Jarmila Machačová	Czech Republic	38.663	
14	Madeleine Sandig	Germany	38.673	
15	Elena Tchalykh	Azerbaijan	38.690	
16	Alžbeta Pavlendová	Slovakia	38.953	
17	Elissavet Chantzi	Greece	39.768	

== Final Classification ==
Rank	Name	Nation	Total
1st place, gold medalist(s)	Leire Olaberria	Spain	26
2nd place, silver medalist(s)	Tatsiana Sharakova	Belarus	29
3rd place, bronze medalist(s)	Małgorzata Wojtyra	Poland	34
4	Laura Trott	Great Britain	36
5	Jolien D'Hoore	Belgium	42
6	Jarmila Machačová	Czech Republic	42
7	Vilija Sereikaitė	Lithuania	46
8	Madeleine Sandig	Germany	47
9	Ellen van Dijk	Netherlands	55
10	Pascale Schnider	Switzerland	56
11	Elena Tchalykh	Azerbaijan	57
12	Evgenia Romanyuta	Russia	60
13	Jennifer O´Reilly	Ireland	69
14	Yelyzaveta Bochkaryova	Ukraine	69
15	Fiona Dutriaux	France	72
16	Alžbeta Pavlendová	Slovakia	93
17	Elissavet Chantzi	Greece	107
18	Monia Baccaille	Italy	DNF
