= 2012 European Track Championships – Women's omnium =

UEC European Champion jersey

The Women's omnium at the 2012 UEC European Track Championships was held on 20–21 October 2012. 10 riders participated.

== Medalists ==
| Gold | Aušrinė Trebaitė (LTU) |
| Silver | Katarzyna Pawłowska (POL) |
| Bronze | Tamara Balabolina (RUS) |

== Results ==
=== Overall results ===
After six events.

| Rank | Rider | Nation | FL | PR | ER | IP | SR | TT | Total |
|---|---|---|---|---|---|---|---|---|---|
| 1st place, gold medalist(s) | Aušrinė Trebaitė | Lithuania | 3 | 5 | 9 | 2 | 1 | 2 | 22 |
| 2nd place, silver medalist(s) | Katarzyna Pawłowska | Poland | 1 | 2 | 3 | 5 | 8 | 3 | 22 |
| 3rd place, bronze medalist(s) | Tamara Balabolina | Russia | 2 | 6 | 8 | 6 | 6 | 1 | 29 |
| 4 | Laurie Berthon | France | 6 | 3 | 1 | 9 | 5 | 5 | 29 |
| 5 | Mieke Kröger | Germany | 7 | 8 | 6 | 1 | 2 | 8 | 32 |
| 6 | Lucie Záleská | Czech Republic | 5 | 4 | 5 | 4 | 10 | 6 | 34 |
| 7 | Alžbeta Pavlendová | Slovakia | 10 | 7 | 4 | 8 | 7 | 9 | 45 |
| 8 | Giulia Donato | Italy | 8 | 9 | 7 | 7 | 9 | 7 | 47 |
| 9 | Pia Pensaari | Finland | 9 | 10 | 10 | 10 | 3 | 10 | 52 |
| DQ | Tatsiana Sharakova | Belarus | 4 | 1 | 2 | 3 | 4 | 4 | 18 |

=== Flying lap ===
It was held at 12:15.

| Rank | Name | Nation | Time | Notes |
|---|---|---|---|---|
| 1 | Katarzyna Pawłowska | Poland | 14.631 | |
| 2 | Tamara Balabolina | Russia | 14.643 | |
| 3 | Aušrinė Trebaitė | Lithuania | 14.729 | |
| 4 | Tatsiana Sharakova | Belarus | 14.798 | |
| 5 | Lucie Záleská | Czech Republic | 14.868 | |
| 6 | Laurie Berthon | France | 14.903 | |
| 7 | Mieke Kröger | Germany | 15.379 | |
| 8 | Giulia Donato | Italy | 15.473 | |
| 9 | Pia Pensaari | Finland | 15.832 | |
| 10 | Alžbeta Pavlendová | Slovakia | 15.889 | |

=== Points race ===
It was held at 13:54.

| Rank | Name | Nation | Laps | Points |
|---|---|---|---|---|
| 1 | Tatsiana Sharakova | Belarus | +1 | 28 |
| 2 | Katarzyna Pawłowska | Poland | 0 | 19 |
| 3 | Laurie Berthon | France | 0 | 13 |
| 4 | Lucie Záleská | Czech Republic | 0 | 12 |
| 5 | Aušrinė Trebaitė | Lithuania | 0 | 12 |
| 6 | Tamara Balabolina | Russia | 0 | 8 |
| 7 | Alžbeta Pavlendová | Slovakia | 0 | 7 |
| 8 | Mieke Kröger | Germany | 0 | 6 |
| 9 | Giulia Donato | Italy | 0 | 3 |
| 10 | Pia Pensaari | Finland | −5 | −100 |

=== Elimination race ===
It was held at 20:34.

| Rank | Name | Nation |
|---|---|---|
| 1 | Laurie Berthon | France |
| 2 | Tatsiana Sharakova | Belarus |
| 3 | Katarzyna Pawłowska | Poland |
| 4 | Alžbeta Pavlendová | Slovakia |
| 5 | Lucie Záleská | Czech Republic |
| 6 | Mieke Kröger | Germany |
| 7 | Giulia Donato | Italy |
| 8 | Tamara Balabolina | Russia |
| 9 | Aušrinė Trebaitė | Lithuania |
| 10 | Pia Pensaari | Finland |

=== Individual pursuit ===
It was held at 10:00.

| Rank | Name | Nation | Time | Notes |
|---|---|---|---|---|
| 1 | Mieke Kröger | Germany | 3:42.276 | |
| 2 | Aušrinė Trebaitė | Lithuania | 3:42.480 | |
| 3 | Tatsiana Sharakova | Belarus | 3:43.523 | |
| 4 | Lucie Záleská | Czech Republic | 3:47.456 | |
| 5 | Katarzyna Pawłowska | Poland | 3:47.874 | |
| 6 | Tamara Balabolina | Russia | 3:48.293 | |
| 7 | Giulia Donato | Italy | 3:51.793 | |
| 8 | Alžbeta Pavlendová | Slovakia | 3:54.056 | |
| 9 | Laurie Berthon | France | 3:56.123 | |
| 10 | Pia Pensaari | Finland | 4:06.476 | |

=== Scratch race ===
It was held at 12:01.

| Rank | Name | Nation | Laps down |
|---|---|---|---|
| 1 | Aušrinė Trebaitė | Lithuania | |
| 2 | Mieke Kröger | Germany | |
| 3 | Pia Pensaari | Finland | −2 |
| 4 | Tatsiana Sharakova | Belarus | −2 |
| 5 | Laurie Berthon | France | −2 |
| 6 | Tamara Balabolina | Russia | −2 |
| 7 | Alžbeta Pavlendová | Slovakia | −2 |
| 8 | Katarzyna Pawłowska | Poland | −2 |
| 9 | Giulia Donato | Italy | −2 |
| 10 | Lucie Záleská | Czech Republic | −2 |

=== 500m time trial ===
It was held at 17:10.

| Rank | Name | Nation | Time |
|---|---|---|---|
| 1 | Tamara Balabolina | Russia | 35.321 |
| 2 | Aušrinė Trebaitė | Lithuania | 35.677 |
| 3 | Katarzyna Pawłowska | Poland | 36.299 |
| 4 | Tatsiana Sharakova | Belarus | 36.801 |
| 5 | Laurie Berthon | France | 36.818 |
| 6 | Lucie Záleská | Czech Republic | 37.471 |
| 7 | Giulia Donato | Italy | 37.490 |
| 8 | Mieke Kröger | Germany | 37.540 |
| 9 | Alžbeta Pavlendová | Slovakia | 37.924 |
| 10 | Pia Pensaari | Finland | 39.955 |
