= 2011 European Track Championships – Women's points race =

UEC European Champion jersey

The Women's points race was held on 21 October 2011. 24 riders participated, the distance was 25 km (100 laps) with a sprint every 10 laps for extra points. A lap would have gotten 20 points.

== Medalists ==
Gold	Evgenia Romanyuta (RUS)
Silver	Katarzyna Pawłowska (POL)
Bronze	Jarmila Machačová (CZE)

== Results ==
The race was held at 21:14.

Rank	Name	Nation	Sprint points	Lap points	Total points
1st place, gold medalist(s)	Evgenia Romanyuta	Russia	19	0	19
2nd place, silver medalist(s)	Katarzyna Pawłowska	Poland	14	0	14
3rd place, bronze medalist(s)	Jarmila Machačová	Czech Republic	13	0	13
4	Aksana Papko	Belarus	10	0	10
5	Madeleine Sandig	Germany	8	0	8
6	Andrea Wölfer	Switzerland	7	0	7
7	Amy Pieters	Netherlands	5	0	5
8	Kelly Druyts	Belgium	5	0	5
9	Danielle King	Great Britain	5	0	5
10	Maaike Polspoel	Belgium	5	0	5
11	Elena Cecchini	Italy	3	0	3
12	Laura van der Kamp	Netherlands	3	0	3
13	Alžbeta Pavlendová	Slovakia	2	0	2
14	Anna Nahirna	Ukraine	2	0	2
15	Gloria Rodríguez García	Spain	2	0	2
16	Ana Usabiaga Balerdi	Spain	1	0	1
17	Stephanie Pohl	Germany	1	0	1
18	Aleksandra Sošenko	Lithuania	0	0	0
19	Elena Lichmanova	Russia	0	0	0
20	Alena Dylko	Belarus	0	0	0
21	Valentina Scandolara	Italy	0	0	0
22	Eugenia Bujak	Poland	0	0	0
–	Vaida Pikauskaitė	Lithuania	−15	−20	DNF
–	Yelyzaveta Bochkaryova	Ukraine	0	0	DNS
