= 2015 UEC European Track Championships – Women's points race =

Women's points race at the 2015 UEC European Track Championships
- UEC European Champion jersey
- Venue: Velodrome Suisse, Grenchen
- Date: 15 October
- Competitors: 18 from 18 nations

Medalists
gold medal	Katarzyna Pawłowska	Poland
silver medal	Élise Delzenne	France
bronze medal	Stephanie Pohl	Germany

The Women's points race was held on 15 October 2015. 18 riders participated over a distance of 25 km (100 laps), with sprints every 10 laps awarding 5, 3, 2 or 1 point to the first four; 20 points are also awarded/withdrawn for each lap gained/lost respectively.

== Results ==
Rank	Name	Nation	Sprint points	Lap points	Finish order	Total points
1st place, gold medalist(s)	Katarzyna Pawłowska	Poland	6	40	15	46
2nd place, silver medalist(s)	Élise Delzenne	France	15	20	1	35
3rd place, bronze medalist(s)	Stephanie Pohl	Germany	12	20	3	32
4	Hanna Solovey	Ukraine	3	20	9	23
5	Lotte Kopecky	Belgium	13	0	4	13
6	Amalie Dideriksen	Denmark	12	0	11	12
7	Kirsten Wild	Netherlands	11	0	10	11
8	Elinor Barker	Great Britain	9	0	14	9
9	Tatsiana Sharakova	Belarus	7	0	7	7
10	Jarmila Machačová	Czech Republic	6	0	2	6
11	Elena Cecchini	Italy	6	0	13	6
12	Aušrinė Trebaitė	Lithuania	5	0	6	5
13	Alexandra Chekina	Russia	5	0	12	5
14	Leire Olaberria	Spain	0	0	5	0
15	Josie Knight	Ireland	0	0	8	0
16	Doris Schweizer	Switzerland	0	0	16	0
—	Alžbeta Pavlendová	Slovakia	0	0	—	DNF
