= 2013 UCI Track Cycling World Championships – Women's scratch =

Women's scratch at the 2013 UCI Track Cycling World Championships
- Venue: Minsk-Arena, Minsk
- Date: 22 February 2013
- Competitors: 18 from 18 nations

Medalists
gold medal	Katarzyna Pawłowska	Poland
silver medal	Sofía Arreola Navarro	Mexico
bronze medal	Evgeniya Romanyuta	Russia

The Women's scratch at the 2013 UCI Track Cycling World Championships was held on February 22. 18 athletes participated in the contest. The competition consisted of 40 laps, making a total of 10 km.

== Results ==
The race was held at 19:15.

Rank	Name	Nation	Laps down
1st place, gold medalist(s)	Katarzyna Pawłowska	Poland	
2nd place, silver medalist(s)	Sofía Arreola Navarro	Mexico	
3rd place, bronze medalist(s)	Evgeniya Romanyuta	Russia	
4	Laurie Berthon	France	
5	Kirsten Wild	Netherlands	
6	Dani King	Great Britain	
7	Caroline Ryan	Ireland	
8	Alžbeta Pavlendová	Slovakia	
9	Leire Olaberria	Spain	
10	Tetyana Klimchenko	Ukraine	
11	Giorgia Bronzini	Italy	
12	Xiao Juan Diao	Hong Kong	
13	Sarah Inghelbrecht	Belgium	
14	Katsiaryna Barazna	Belarus	
15	Melissa Hoskins	Australia	
16	Stephanie Pohl	Germany	
17	Sarah Hammer	United States	
18	Jarmila Machačová	Czech Republic	
