= 2014 UCI Track Cycling World Championships – Women's scratch =

Women's scratch at the 2014 UCI Track Cycling World Championships
- Venue: Velódromo Alcides Nieto Patiño, Cali
- Date: 26 February 2014
- Competitors: 20 from 20 nations

Medalists
gold medal	Kelly Druyts	Belgium
silver medal	Katarzyna Pawłowska	Poland
bronze medal	Evgenia Romanyuta	Russia

The Women's scratch at the 2014 UCI Track Cycling World Championships was held on 26 February 2014. 20 cyclists participated in the event, which was contested over 40 laps, equating to a distance of 10 km (6.2 mi).

== Results ==
The race was started at 19:40.

Rank	Name	Nation	Laps down
1st place, gold medalist(s)	Kelly Druyts	Belgium	
2nd place, silver medalist(s)	Katarzyna Pawłowska	Poland	
3rd place, bronze medalist(s)	Evgenia Romanyuta	Russia	
4	Jennifer Valente	United States	
5	Laurie Berthon	France	
6	Leire Olaberria	Spain	
7	Yumari González	Cuba	
8	Danielle King	Great Britain	
9	Giorgia Bronzini	Italy	
10	Katsiaryna Barazna	Belarus	
11	Jarmila Machačová	Czech Republic	
12	Diao Xiao Juan	Hong Kong	
13	Alzbeta Pavlendová	Slovakia	
14	Caroline Ryan	Ireland	
15	Stephanie Pohl	Germany	
16	Milena Salcedo	Colombia	
17	Mayra Del Rocio Rocha	Mexico	
18	Tetyana Klimchenko	Ukraine	
19	Ashlee Ankudinoff	Australia	
	Jupha Somnet	Malaysia	DNF
