= 2012 European Track Championships – Women's team pursuit =

UEC European Champion jersey

The Women's team pursuit was held on 19 October 2012. 6 nations participated.

== Medalists ==
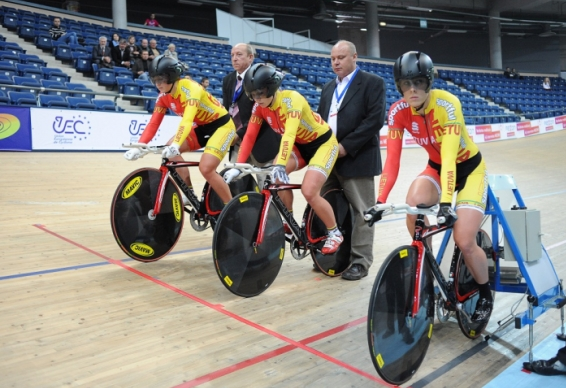
The Lithuania team (Vilija Sereikaitė, Vaida Pikauskaitė and Aušrinė Trebaitė)

Gold	Lithuania; Aušrinė Trebaitė; Vilija Sereikaitė; Vaida Pikauskaitė
Silver	Poland; Katarzyna Pawłowska; Eugenia Bujak; Małgorzata Wojtyra
Bronze	Belarus; Tatsiana Sharakova; Alena Dylko; Aksana Papko

== Results ==
Fastest 2 teams raced for gold and 3rd and 4th teams raced for bronze.

=== Qualifying ===
It was held at 13:00.

Rank	Name	Nation	Time	Notes
1	Aušrinė Trebaitė; Vilija Sereikaitė; Vaida Pikauskaitė	Lithuania	3:26.109	Q
2	Katarzyna Pawłowska; Eugenia Bujak; Małgorzata Wojtyra	Poland	3:27.158	Q
3	Tatsiana Sharakova; Alena Dylko; Aksana Papko	Belarus	3:27.174	q
4	Mieke Kröger; Stephanie Pohl; Lisa Fischer	Germany	3:32.074	q
5	Evgenia Romanyuta; Elena Lichmanova; Maria Mishina	Russia	3:33.006	
6	Giulia Donato; Elena Cecchini; Beatrice Bartelloni	Italy	3:34.721	

=== Finals ===
The finals were held at 19:30.

Rank	Name	Nation	Time
Gold Medal Race
1st place, gold medalist(s)	Aušrinė Trebaitė; Vilija Sereikaitė; Vaida Pikauskaitė	Lithuania	3:25.237
2nd place, silver medalist(s)	Katarzyna Pawłowska; Eugenia Bujak; Małgorzata Wojtyra	Poland	3:27.086
Bronze Medal Race
3rd place, bronze medalist(s)	Tatsiana Sharakova; Alena Dylko; Aksana Papko	Belarus	3:24.801
4	Mieke Kröger; Stephanie Pohl; Lisa Fischer	Germany	3:32.127
