= 2013 UCI Track Cycling World Championships – Women's points race =

2013 cycling championship

Rainbow jersey

The Women's points race at the 2013 UCI Track Cycling World Championships was held on February 23. 17 athletes participated in the contest. The competition consisted of 100 laps, making a total of 25 km with 10 sprints.

== Medalists ==
Gold	Jarmila Machačová (CZE)
Silver	Sofía Arreola Navarro (MEX)
Bronze	Giorgia Bronzini (ITA)

== Results ==
The race was held at 19:25.

Rank	Name	Nation	Sprint points	Lap points	Total points
1st place, gold medalist(s)	Jarmila Machačová	Czech Republic	10	20	30
2nd place, silver medalist(s)	Sofía Arreola Navarro	Mexico	9	20	29
3rd place, bronze medalist(s)	Giorgia Bronzini	Italy	22	0	22
4	Jamie Wong	Hong Kong	2	20	22
5	Kirsten Wild	Netherlands	17	0	17
6	Anastasia Chulkova	Russia	13	0	13
7	Yudelmis Domínguez Masague	Cuba	11	0	11
8	Dani King	United Kingdom	8	0	8
9	Stephanie Pohl	Germany	7	0	7
10	Małgorzata Wojtyra	Poland	5	0	5
11	Lotte Kopecky	Belgium	3	0	3
12	Hiroko Ishii	Japan	3	0	3
13	Caroline Ryan	Ireland	0	0	0
14	Alena Dylko	Belarus	0	0	0
15	Jasmin Glaesser	Canada	0	0	0
16	Valeriya Kononenko	Ukraine	0	−20	−20
	Ashlee Ankudinoff	Australia	0	0	DNF
