= Evy Kuijpers =

Dutch cyclist (born 1995)

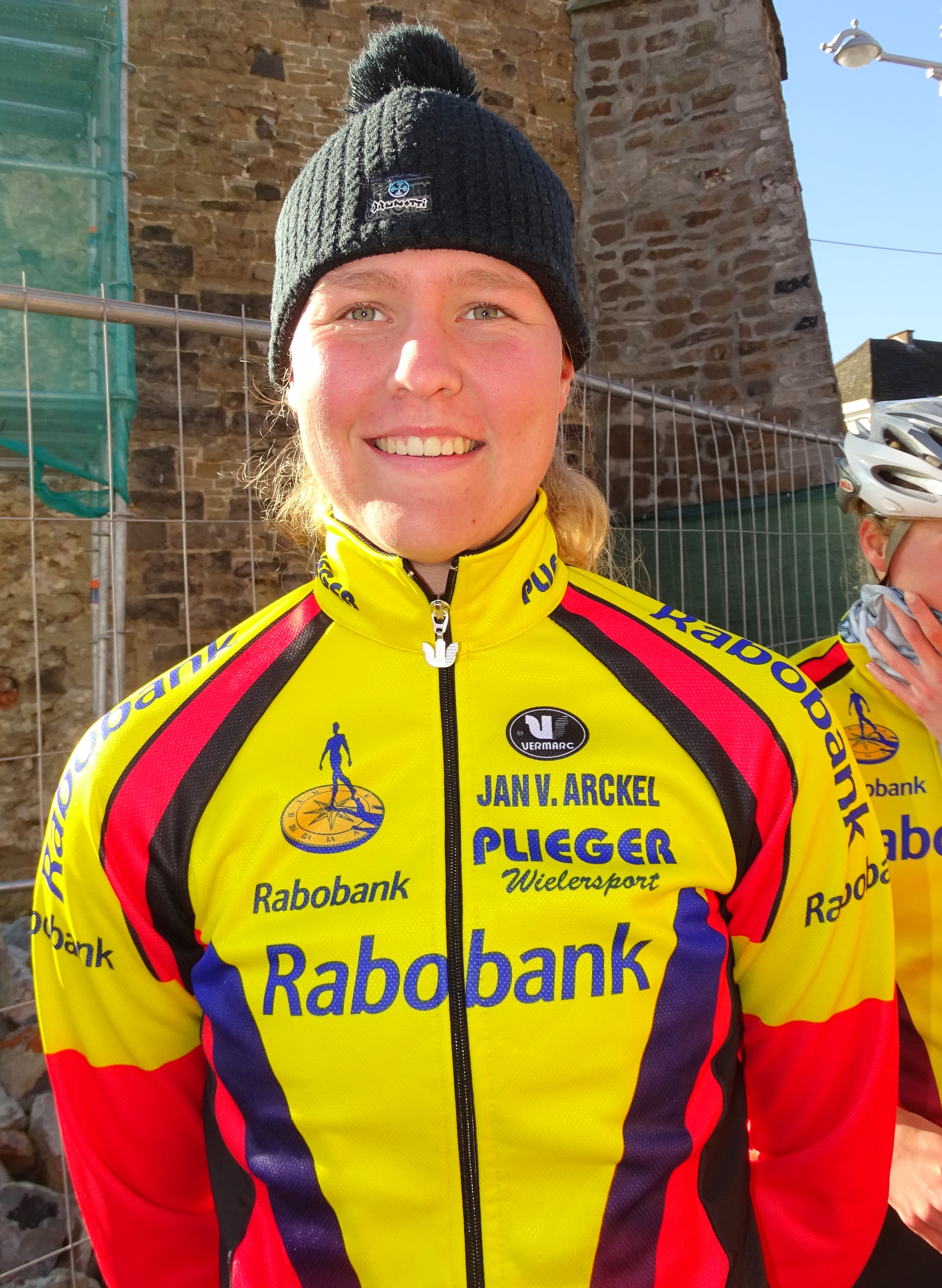
- Kuijpers in 2016

Personal information
- Full name: Evy Kuijpers
- Born: 15 February 1995 (age 31) Lierop, Netherlands

Cycling career
- Sport: Cycling
- Current team: Fenix–Premier Tech
- Discipline: Road
- Role: Rider
- Rider type: All-rounder

Amateur team
- 2016–2018: Jan van Arckel

Professional teams
- 2010–2011: Brainwash
- 2014–2015: Futurumshop.nl–Zannata
- 2019–2021: CCC - Liv
- 2022: Human Powered Health
- 2023–: Fenix–Deceuninck

Evy Kuijpers (born 15 February 1995) is a Dutch professional racing cyclist, who rides for UCI Women's WorldTeam Fenix–Premier Tech. In 2014 and 2015 she rode for the Lensworld.eu–Zannata team.

== Major results ==
2015
7th Omloop van de IJsseldelta
8th Dwars door Vlaanderen
8th EPZ Omloop van Borsele
2018
2nd Erondegemse Pijl
3rd Omloop van Borsele
4th GP Sofie Goos
7th 7-Dorpenomloop Aalburg
2019
7th Omloop van de IJsseldelta
8th Drentse Acht van Westerveld
2022
8th Overall BeNe Ladies Tour
2023
2nd GP Oetingen
6th Antwerp Port Epic
7th Binche Chimay Binche pour Dames
7th Dwars door de Westhoek
8th Grote Prijs Yvonne Reynders
2024
1st GP Lucien Van Impe
2nd Grote Prijs Yvonne Reynders
