= Sofía Arreola =

Mexican cyclist (born 1991)

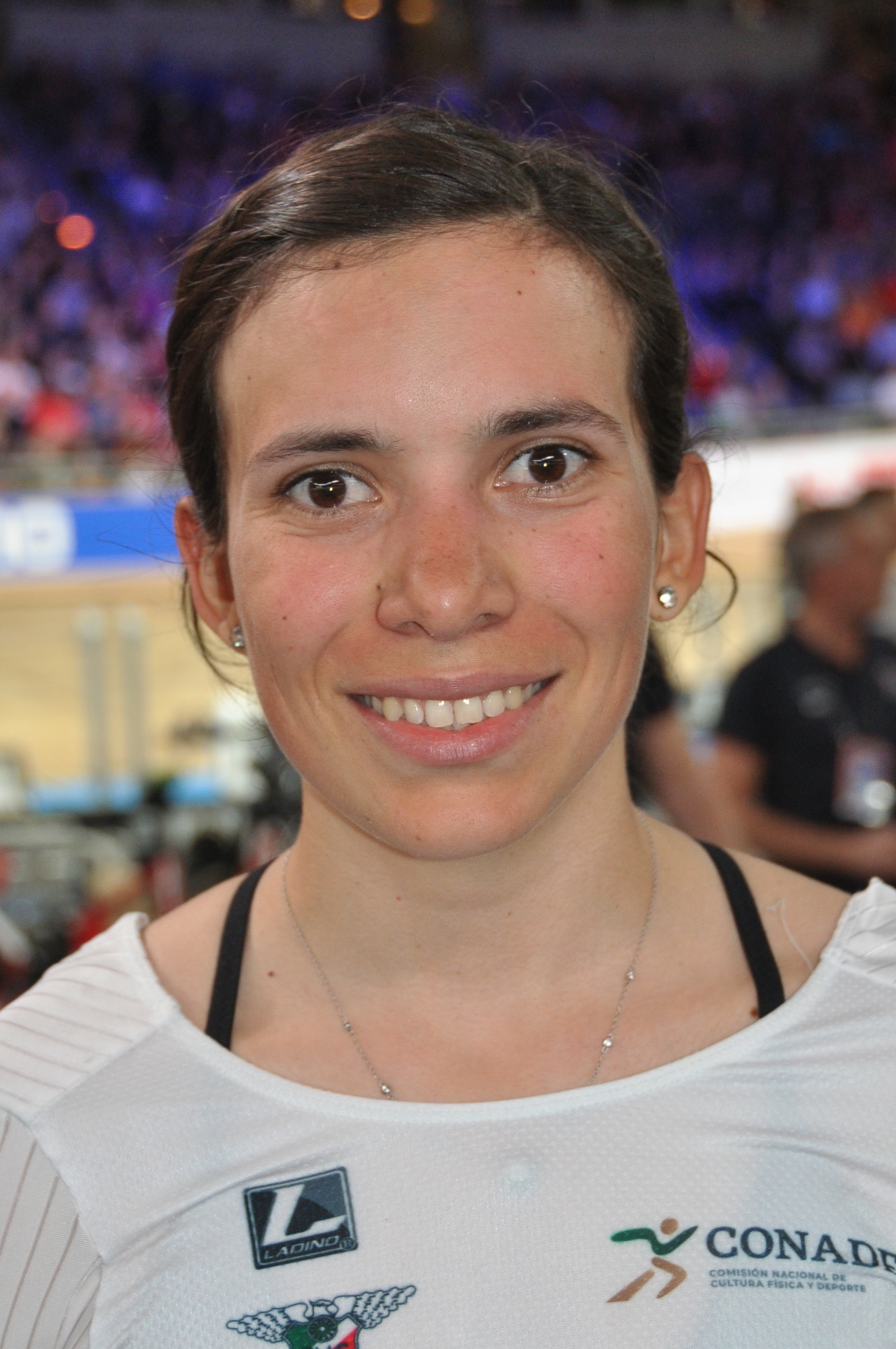
- Sofía Arreola (2020)

Personal information
- Full name: Sofía Arreola Navarro
- Nickname: Sofí
- Born: 22 April 1991 (age 35) Monterrey, Mexico

Cycling career
- Sport: Cycling
- Current team: Virginia's Blue Ridge–Twenty28
- Disciplines: Road; Track
- Role: Rider

Amateur team
- 2014: Twenty16

Professional team
- 2016–: Twenty16–Ridebiker
Medal record
Representing Mexico
Women's track cycling
World Championships
Silver medal – second place	2013 Minsk	Scratch
Silver medal – second place	2013 Minsk	Points race
Pan American Games
Silver medal – second place	2011 Guadalajara	Omnium
Bronze medal – third place	2015 Toronto	Team pursuit
Pan American Championships
Gold medal – first place	2018 Aguascalientes	Madison
Gold medal – first place	2026 Santiago	Madison
Silver medal – second place	2010 Aguascalientes	Scratch
Silver medal – second place	2016 Aguascalientes	Team pursuit
Silver medal – second place	2017 Couva	Team pursuit
Silver medal – second place	2019 Cochabamba	Points race
Silver medal – second place	2021 Lima	Team pursuit
Silver medal – second place	2023 San Juan	Team pursuit
Silver medal – second place	2025 Asunción	Points race
Silver medal – second place	2026 Santiago	Team pursuit
Bronze medal – third place	2017 Couva	Madison
Bronze medal – third place	2019 Cochabamba	Team pursuit
Bronze medal – third place	2021 Lima	Elimination
Central American and Caribbean Games
Silver medal – second place	2026 Santo Domingo	Madison
Silver medal – second place	2026 Santo Domingo	Team pursuit

Sofía Arreola Navarro (born 22 April 1991) is a Mexican track and road cyclist, who currently rides for UCI Women's Team Virginia's Blue Ridge–Twenty28. She represented her nation at the 2010 UCI Road World Championships. She competed in the points race event at the 2010 UCI Track Cycling World Championships. At the 2013 UCI Track Cycling World Championships she won the silver medal in the scratch event and also in the points race.

== Career results ==
=== Track ===
2010
2nd Scratch, Pan American Track Championships
2011
2nd Omnium, Pan American Games
2013
UCI Track World Championships

2nd Scratch
2nd Points race

3rd Points race, 6 giorni delle rose – Fiorenzuola (Under-23)
2014
Copa Internacional de Pista

1st Individual pursuit
1st Omnium
1st Scratch
3rd Points race

Grand Prix of Colorado Spring

3rd Omnium
3rd Points race

2015
3rd Team pursuit, Pan American Games (with Mayra del Rocio Rocha, Íngrid Drexel and Yareli Salazar)
3rd Points race, Independence Day Grand Prix
2016
2nd Team pursuit, Pan American Track Championships (with Jesica Bonilla, Mayra Del Rocio Rocha and Yareli Salazar)
2018
3rd Points race, International Belgian Track Meeting

=== Road ===
2009
2nd Road race, National Road Championships
2010
National Road Championships

3rd Road race
3rd Time trial

2016
2nd Clasico FVCiclismo Corre Por la VIDA
3rd Road race
9th Campeonato Panamericano de Ruta - Road race
