= 2015 EPZ Omloop van Borsele =

The 2015 EPZ Omloop van Borsele was the 13th running of the Omloop van Borsele, a women's cycling event in 's-Heerenhoek, the Netherlands. There was an individual time trial over 19.9 kilometres (12.4 miles) on 24 April – categorised as a national event – and a 1.2-category road race over 137 kilometres (85.1 miles) on 25 April 2015.

== Results ==
=== Time trial ===
2015 EPZ Omloop van Borsele – time trial
Race details
- Dates: 24 April 2015
- Distance: 19.9 km (12.4 mi)
- Winning time: 26' 14.65"

Results
	Winner	Ellen van Dijk (NED)	(Boels–Dolmans)
	Second	Lisa Brennauer (GER)	(Velocio–SRAM)
	Third	Anna van der Breggen (NED)	(Rabobank-Liv Woman Cycling Team)

The individual time trial was held on 24 April over a distance of 19.9 kilometres (12.4 miles). For the fourth time in a row Ellen van Dijk won the time trial.

Result
Rank	Rider	Team	Time
1	Ellen van Dijk (NED)	Boels–Dolmans	26' 14.65"
2	Lisa Brennauer (GER)	Velocio–SRAM	+ 17.83"
3	Anna van der Breggen (NED)	Rabobank-Liv Woman Cycling Team	+ 47.49"
4	Chantal Blaak (NED)	Boels–Dolmans	+ 56.80"
5	Lucinda Brand (NED)	Rabobank-Liv Woman Cycling Team	+ 1' 04.44"
6	Tatiana Antoshina (RUS)	Servetto Footon	+ 1' 05.72"
7	Evelyn Stevens (USA)	Boels–Dolmans	+ 1' 08.47"
8	Roxane Knetemann (NED)	Rabobank-Liv Woman Cycling Team	+ 1' 12.21"
9	Élise Delzenne (FRA)	Velocio–SRAM	+ 1' 16.70"
10	Tayler Wiles (USA)	Velocio–SRAM	+ 1' 16.87"

=== Road race ===
2015 EPZ Omloop van Borsele – road race
Race details
- Dates: 25 April 2015
- Distance: 139 km (86 mi)
- Winning time: 3h 23' 51"

Results
	Winner	Kirsten Wild (NED)	(Team Hitec Products)
	Second	Shelley Olds (USA)	(Bigla Pro Cycling Team)
	Third	Anna Knauer (GER)	(Rabobank-Liv Woman Cycling Team)

The road race was held on 25 April over a distance of 139 kilometres (86.4 miles).

Result
Rank	Rider	Team	Time
1	Kirsten Wild (NED)	Team Hitec Products	3h 23' 51"
2	Shelley Olds (USA)	Bigla Pro Cycling Team	+ 0"
3	Anna Knauer (GER)	Rabobank-Liv Woman Cycling Team	+ 0"
4	Barbara Guarischi (ITA)	Velocio–SRAM	+ 0"
5	Marta Tagliaferro (ITA)	Alé–Cipollini	+ 0"
6	Kim de Baat (NED)	Lensworld.eu–Zannata	+ 0"
7	Chanella Stougje (NED)	Parkhotel Valkenburg Continental Team	+ 0"
8	Evy Kuijpers (NED)	Lensworld.eu–Zannata	+ 0"
9	Tiffany Cromwell (AUS)	Velocio–SRAM	+ 0"
10	Monique van de Ree (NED)	De Jonge Renner Ladies	+ 0"

== See also ==
- 2015 in women's road cycling
