= Natalia Rutkowska =

Polish cyclist (born 1991)

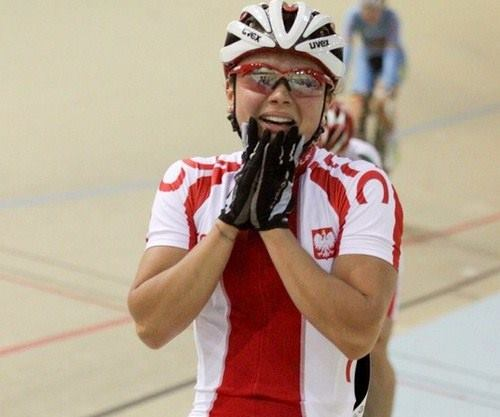
- Natalia Rutkowska in 2012

Personal information
- Born: 21 January 1991 (age 35) Olsztyn, Poland

Cycling career
- Sport: Cycling
- Role: Rider (track)

Major wins
- 2012: European Champion (under-23) in scratch

Natalia Rutkowska (born 21 January 1991) is a Polish track racing cyclist.

== Career results ==
2011
3rd Team Sprint, UEC European U23 Track Championships (with Małgorzata Wojtyra)
2012
1st Scratch Race, UEC European U23 Track Championships
2013
Grand Prix Vienna

2nd Team Sprint (with Eugenia Bujak)
3rd Individual Pursuit
3rd Points Race
3rd Sprint

2nd Points Race, 6 giorni delle rose – Fiorenzuola (U23)
2014
3rd Points Race, Grand Prix of Poland
2015
1st Scratch Race, Panevėžys
Grand Prix Galichyna

3rd Omnium
3rd Points Race

2016
Grand Prix of Poland

1st Team Pursuit (with Edyta Jasińska, Katarzyna Pawłowska and Małgorzata Wojtyra)
3rd Points Race

Panevežys

1st Omnium
2nd Scratch Race

Grand Prix Galichyna

1st Points Race
1st Scratch Race

Grand Prix Minsk

2nd Omnium
2nd Scratch Race
3rd Points Race

2nd Scratch Race, GP Czech Cycling Federation
