= Denis Shurshin =

Russian cyclist

Personal information
- Born: 8 December 1989 (age 36)

Cycling career
- Sport: Cycling
- Discipline: Track cycling
- Role: Rider
- Rider type: sprint

Denis Shurshin (born 8 December 1989) is a Russian male track cyclist. He competed in the sprint event at the 2013 UCI Track Cycling World Championships.
