= Virginie Perizzolo Pointet =

Swiss cyclist

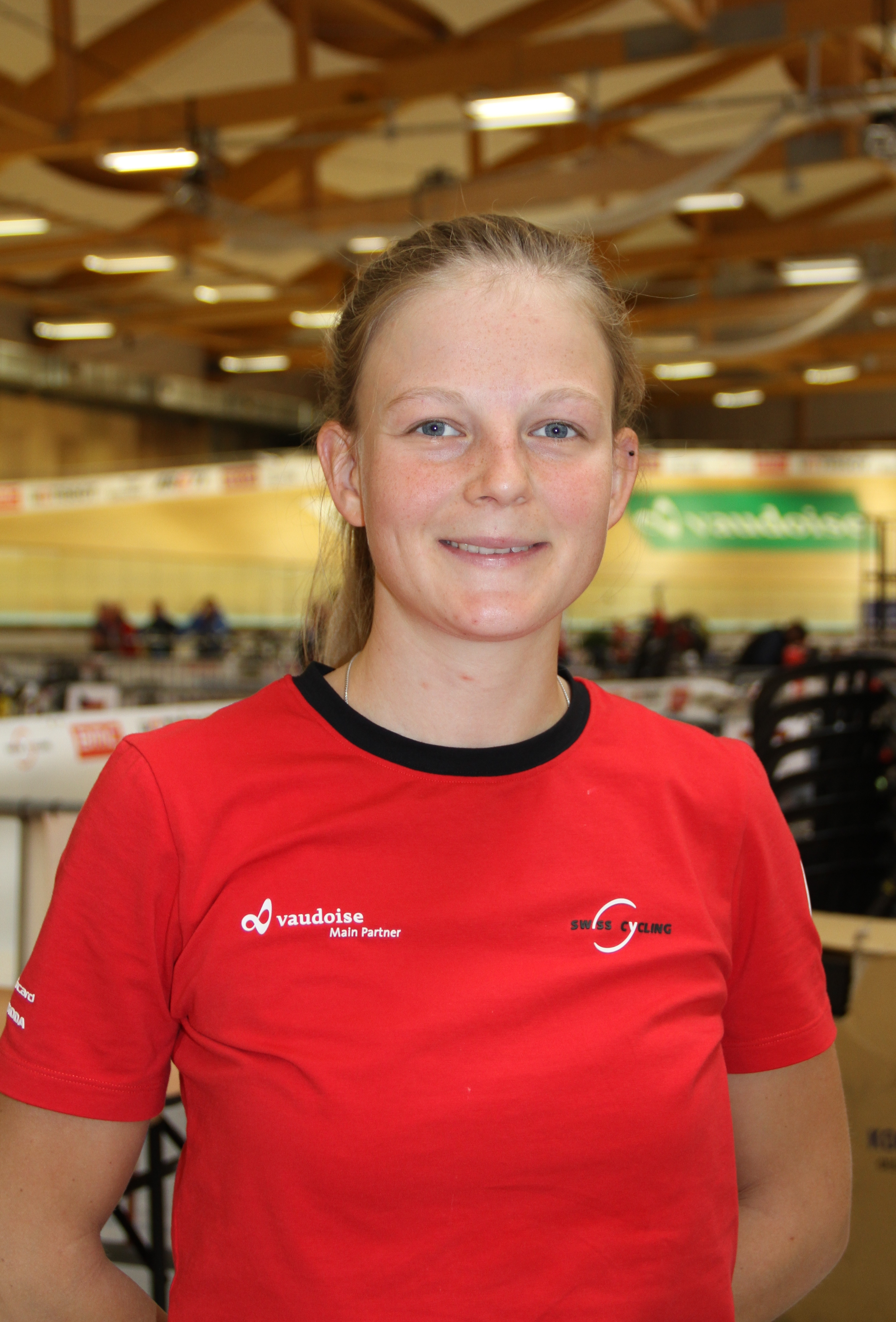

Personal information
- Full name: Virginie Perizzolo Pointet
- Born: 26 February 1990 (age 36)

Cycling career
- Sport: Cycling
- Disciplines: Road; Track cycling; Mountain biking
- Role: Rider

Amateur team
- 2017–2019: Team Compressport

Professional teams
- 2009–2010: Team Bikepark.ch
- 2012–2013: JB Felt Team
- 2019: Cogeas–Mettler–Look

Virginie Perizzolo Pointet (born 26 February 1990) is a Swiss road and track cyclist, who last rode for UCI Women's Team Cogeas–Mettler–Look. Perizzolo Pointet has also represented Switzerland at international competitions, competing at the 2016 UEC European Track Championships in the scratch and 500-metre time trial events.

== Major results ==
2015
3rd Omnium Genevois
3rd 500m Time Trial, Trofeu CAR Anadia Portugal
