= Romain Le Roux =

French cyclist

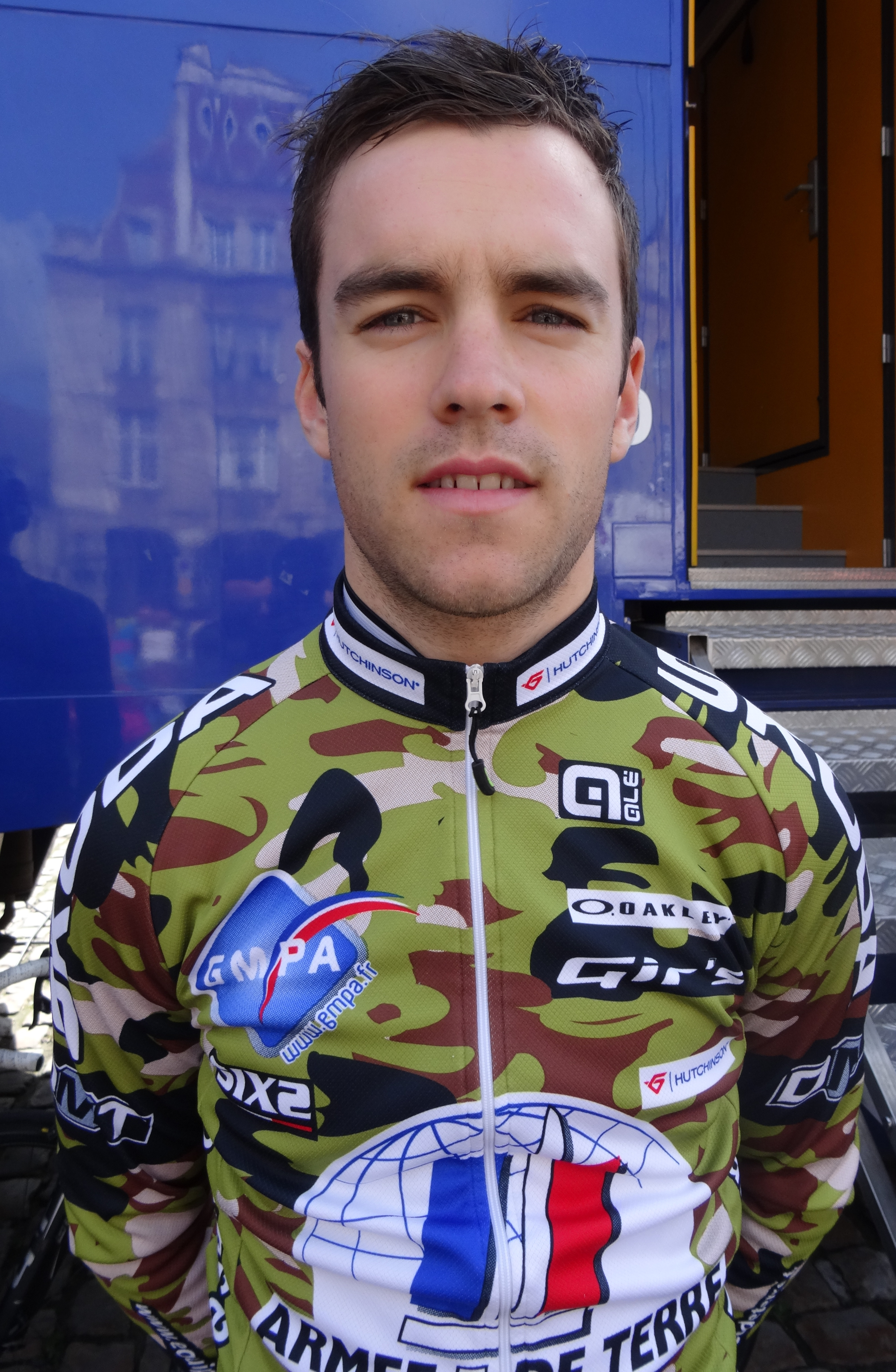
- Le Roux in 2014.

Personal information
- Full name: Romain Le Roux
- Born: 3 July 1992 (age 34) Guipavas, France

Cycling career
- Sport: Cycling
- Current team: Retired
- Disciplines: Road; Track
- Role: Rider

Amateur teams
- 2011–2012: BIC 2000
- 2013–2014: Armée de Terre
- 2014: Roubaix–Lille Métropole (stagiaire)

Professional teams
- 2015–2017: Armée de Terre
- 2018–2020: Fortuneo–Samsic

Romain Le Roux (born 3 July 1992 in Guipavas) is a French former track and road cyclist, who rode professionally between 2015 and 2020, for the Armée de Terre and Arkéa–Samsic teams.

== Major results ==
2015
8th Cholet-Pays de Loire
2017
5th Overall Ronde de l'Oise
5th Polynormande
