= Katarzyna Pawłowska =

Polish cyclist (born 1989)

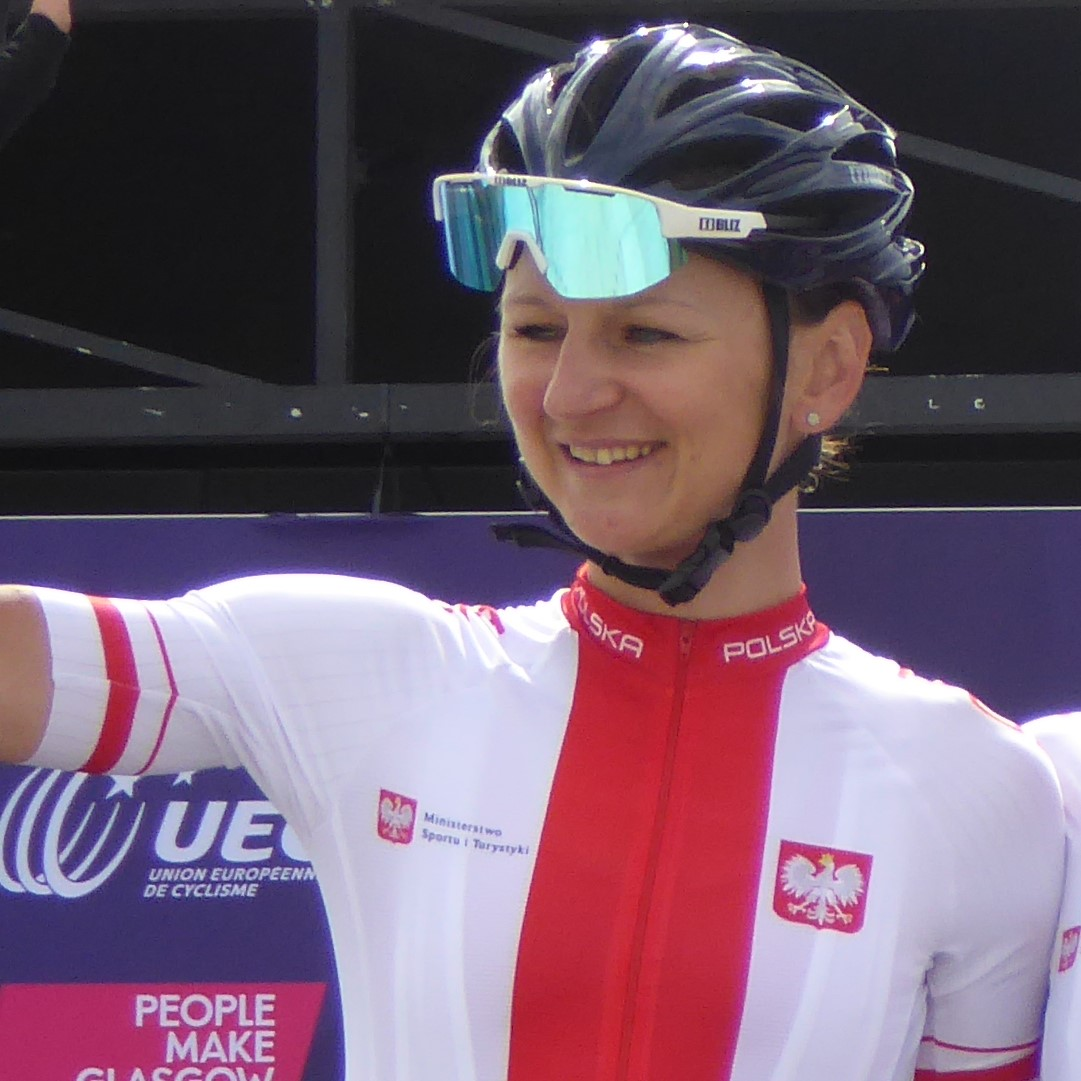
- Pawłowska at the 2018 European Road Cycling Championships.

Personal information
- Full name: Katarzyna Pawłowska
- Nickname: Kasia
- Born: 16 August 1989 (age 37) Przygodzice, Poland

Cycling career
- Sport: Cycling
- Disciplines: Road; Track
- Role: Rider
- Rider type: All-rounder

Amateur team
- 2020: Illi-Bikes Cycling Team

Professional teams
- 2013: GSD Gestion–Kallisto
- 2014–2017: Boels–Dolmans
- 2018–2019: Team Virtu Cycling
Medal record
World Championships
| Gold medal – first place | 2012 Melbourne | Scratch |
| Gold medal – first place | 2013 Minsk | Scratch |
| Gold medal – first place | 2016 London | Points race |
| Silver medal – second place | 2014 Cali | Scratch |
European Championships
| Gold medal – first place | 2015 Grenchen | Points race |
| Silver medal – second place | 2011 Apeldoorn | Points race |
| Silver medal – second place | 2012 Panevėžys | Team pursuit |
| Silver medal – second place | 2013 Apeldoorn | Team pursuit |
| Silver medal – second place | 2016 Yvelines | Team pursuit |
| Bronze medal – third place | 2012 Panevėžys | Omnium |
| Bronze medal – third place | 2016 Yvelines | Points race |
| Bronze medal – third place | 2017 Berlin | Team pursuit |
European Games
| Bronze medal – third place | 2019 Minsk | Team pursuit |

Katarzyna Pawłowska (born 16 August 1989) is a Polish road racing and track cyclist, who most recently rode for Belgian amateur team Illi-Bikes Cycling Team. She won the women's scratch race at the UCI Track Cycling World Championships in 2012 and 2013, and competed for her country in the road race at the 2012 Summer Olympics, finishing eleventh.

== Major results ==
=== Road ===
2009
3rd Time trial, National Road Championships
2012
1st Road race, National Road Championships
1st Pollinkhove Criterium
3rd Ronde van 't Ginneken
2013
National Road Championships

1st Time trial
3rd Road race

1st Overall Tour Féminin en Limousin

1st Stages 3 & 4

3rd Grand Prix cycliste de Gatineau
4th Overall Grand Prix Elsy Jacobs
5th Grand Prix de Dottignies
5th Ronde van Gelderland
7th Overall Tour de Bretagne Féminin

1st Mountains classification
1st Stage 3

7th Gooik–Geraardsbergen–Gooik
2014
2nd Time trial, National Road Championships
3rd Open de Suède Vårgårda TTT
5th Holland Hills Classic
7th Durango-Durango Emakumeen Saria
2015
2nd Team time trial, UCI Road World Championships
3rd Time trial, National Road Championships
5th Ronde van Gelderland
2016
1st Crescent Vårgårda UCI Women's WorldTour TTT
Tour Cycliste Féminin International de l'Ardèche

1st Stages 1 & 2

2nd Time trial, National Road Championships
8th Time trial, UEC European Road Championships
8th Gran Premio Bruno Beghelli Internazionale Donne Elite
9th UCI Road World Championships – Women's time trial
2017
1st Time trial, National Road Championships
1st Stage 2 (TTT) Healthy Ageing Tour
Tour Cycliste Féminin International de l'Ardèche

1st Stages 1 & 2

7th Time trial, UEC European Road Championships
2018
1st Sprints classification Emakumeen Euskal Bira
2nd Time trial, National Road Championships
5th Cadel Evans Great Ocean Road Race

=== Track ===
2010
1st Points race, National Track Championships
2nd Team pursuit, UEC European Under-23 Track Championships (with Renata Dąbrowska and Małgorzata Wojtyra)
2011
1st Points race, National Track Championships
2nd Scratch, 2011–12 UCI Track Cycling World Cup, Cali
2nd Points race, UEC European Track Championships
UEC European Under-23 Track Championships

2nd Individual pursuit
2nd Team pursuit (with Eugenia Alickun and Małgorzata Wojtyra)
3rd Points race

2012
1st Scratch, UCI Track World Championships
National Track Championships

1st Individual pursuit
1st Omnium
1st Points race
1st Scratch

2nd Points race, 2011–12 UCI Track Cycling World Cup, Beijing
UEC European Track Championships

2nd Team pursuit (with Małgorzata Wojtyra & Eugenia Bujak)
3rd Omnium

2013
1st Scratch, UCI Track World Championships
National Track Championships

1st Individual pursuit
1st Omnium

2012–13 UCI Track Cycling World Cup, Aguascalientes

1st Points race
1st Individual pursuit

1st Points race, Grand Prix of Poland
2nd Team pursuit, UEC European Track Championships (with Eugenia Bujak, Małgorzata Wojtyra & Edyta Jasińska)
2014
Panevezys

1st Scratch
2nd Individual pursuit
2nd Omnium

Grand Prix Galichyna

1st Omnium
1st Scratch
2nd Individual pursuit

2nd Scratch, UCI Track World Championships
International Track Women & Men

2nd Omnium
2nd Points race
3rd Scratch

2015
1st Points race, UEC European Track Championships
Grand Prix Galichyna

1st Omnium
1st Points race
1st Scratch

2016
1st Points race, UCI Track World Championships
Grand Prix of Poland

1st Team pursuit (with Edyta Jasińska, Natalia Rutkowska and Małgorzata Wojtyra)
3rd Omnium

UEC European Track Championships

2nd Team pursuit
3rd Points race

2017
1st Omnium, National Track Championships
Grand Prix Minsk

1st Points race
2nd Omnium

3rd Points race, UEC European Track Championships
3rd Points race, Grand Prix Poland
