= Anna Knauer =

German cyclist

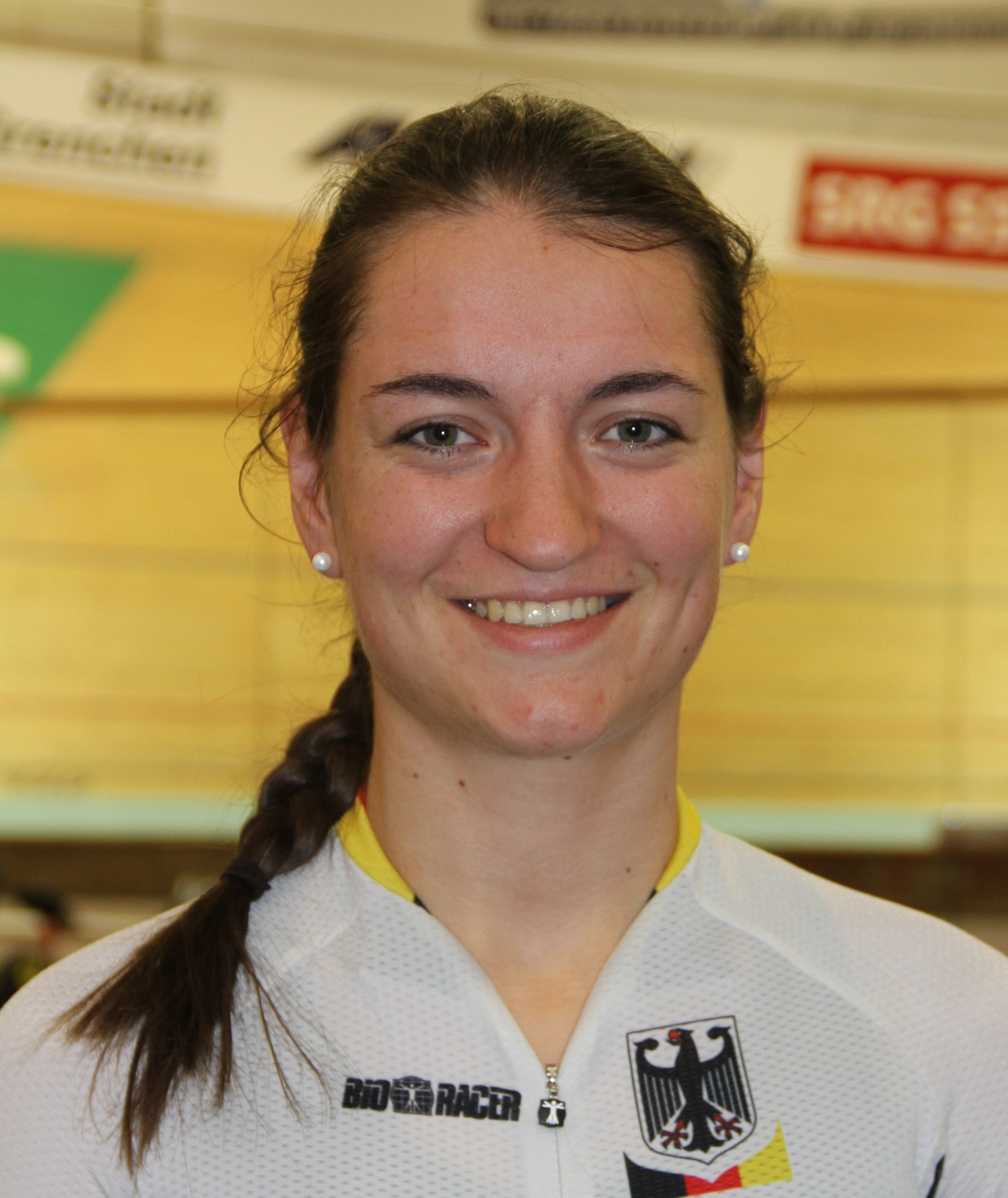
- Knauer at the 2015 UEC European Track Championships

Personal information
- Born: 20 February 1995 (age 31) Eichstätt, Germany

Cycling career
- Sport: Cycling
- Disciplines: Road; Track
- Role: Rider

Amateur teams
- 2006–2011: RC Germania Weißenburg
- 2012: RSC Hildesheim
- 2012: Team Sonosan–Multipower Juniorinnen
- 2013: Rottaler RSV
- 2013: Team Mangertseder Bayern
- 2018–2019: RC Germania Weißenburg
- 2018–2019: maxx-solar Lindig

Professional teams
- 2014–2015: Rabobank-Liv Woman Cycling Team
- 2016–2017: Parkhotel Valkenburg Continental Team
Medal record
Women's track cycling
Representing Germany
European Championships
Silver medal – second place	2018 Glasgow	Elimination race
Bronze medal – third place	2014 Baie-Mahault	Omnium

Anna Knauer (born 20 February 1995) is a German former professional racing cyclist, who rode professionally between 2014 and 2017 for the Rabobank-Liv Woman Cycling Team and Parkhotel Valkenburg–Destil teams.

== Major results ==
=== Track ===
2011
National Novices Track Championships

1st 500m time trial
1st Individual pursuit
1st Points race

1st Team pursuit, National Junior Track Championships
2012
UEC European Junior Track Championships

1st Omnium
2nd Individual pursuit

National Junior Track Championships

1st Points race
1st Team pursuit
2nd 500m time trial

2013
1st Omnium, UCI World Juniors Track Cycling Championships
National Junior Track Championships

1st Points race
1st Team pursuit
1st Team sprint
1st Individual pursuit
1st 500m time trial

2014
National Track Championships

1st Omnium
2nd Individual pursuit
2nd Points race

3rd Omnium, UEC European Track Championships
3rd Omnium, Sprintermeeting
2015
National Track Championships

1st Points race
1st Omnium

UEC European Under-23 Track Championships

2nd Team pursuit (with Lisa Klein, Mieke Kröger and Gudrun Stock)
3rd Omnium

2nd Omnium, Grand Prix of Poland
3rd Omnium, 2014–15 UCI Track Cycling World Cup, Cali
2016
1st Omnium, National Track Championships
2017
3rd Scratch, Six Days of Bremen

=== Road ===
2011
National Novices Road Championships

1st Road race
1st Time trial

2012
National Junior Road Championships

1st Road race
3rd Time trial

2013
National Junior Road Championships

1st Road race
2nd Time trial

2014
1st Stage 2 (TTT) Belgium Tour
2015
3rd EPZ Omloop van Borsele
8th Ronde van Overijssel

== See also ==
- 2014 Rabo-Liv Women Cycling Team season
