= Rino Gasparrini =

Italian cyclist

Personal information
- Full name: Rino Gasparrini
- Born: 8 April 1992 (age 34)

Cycling career
- Sport: Cycling
- Discipline: Road
- Role: Rider

Amateur teams
- 2007–2009: Team Ceci Dreambike
- 2010: Cycling Progetto Immobiliare
- 2011–2013: U.C. Trevigiani–Dynamon–Bottoli
- 2016–2017: Team Beltrami TSA–Argon 18–Tre Colli
- 2018–2019: Calzaturieri Montegranaro–Marini Silvano

Professional teams
- 2014–2015: MG Kvis–Trevigiani
- 2016: Androni Giocattoli–Sidermec (stagiaire)

Rino Gasparrini (born 8 April 1992) is an Italian cyclist, who last rode for Italian amateur team Calzaturieri Montegranaro–Marini Silvano.

== Major results ==
2014
1st Stage 1 Vuelta al Táchira
2nd Circuito del Porto
7th Banja Luka Belgrade I
2015
4th Trofej Umag
5th Circuito del Porto
2017
8th Circuito del Porto
