= Sara Ferrara =

Finnish cyclist

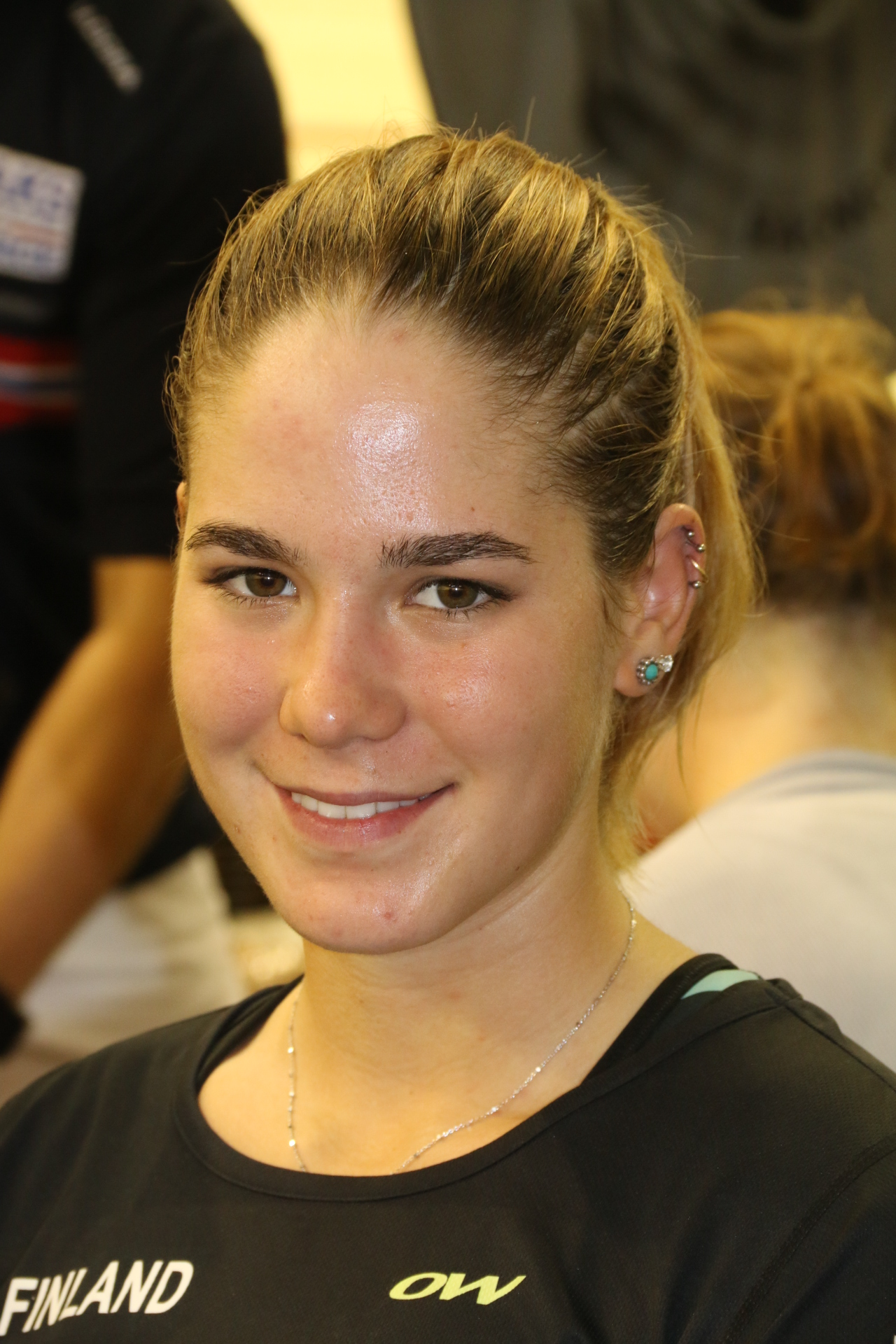
- Ferrara in 2017

Personal information
- Full name: Sara Ferrara Airas
- Born: 24 July 1995 (age 31) Monterrey, Mexico

Cycling career
- Sport: Cycling
- Discipline: Track cycling

Sara Ferrara (born 24 July 1995) is a track cyclist from Finland. She was born in Monterrey, Mexico to a Mexican father and a Finnish mother. Sara Ferrara began her cycling career representing Mexico as a Junior. She won three gold medals, in the Omnium, Individual Pursuit, and Team Pursuit at the 2012 junior Panamerican championships in Guatemala. She holds the Junior Individual pursuit national record in Finland with a time of 2:26.5 as well as the U16 with a time of 2:30.1. She represented Mexico at the 2012 UCI Junior Track Cycling World Invercargill Championships as well as at the 2013 UCI Junior Track Cycling World Championships Glasgow. She represented Mexico at the 2013 UCI World Cup Aguascalientes in the Team Pursuit.

In 2014 she changed nationalities with the UCI to represent Finland. She represented her nation at the 2015 UCI Track Cycling World Championships. She was born in Monterrey, Mexico to a Mexican father and a Finnish mother. In 2018 she was selected for the European Championship Games in Glasgow.

== Major results ==
2012
1st Individual Pursuit, Junior Panamerican championships
1st Team Pursuit, Junior Panamerican championships
1st Omnium, Junior Panamerican championships

2015
17th Scratch Race, UCI World Championships

2016
10th Scratch Race, U23 European Championships

2016
10th Scratch Race, UCI world cup Glasgow
2017
1st Scratch Race, TROFEU CIUTAT DE BARCELONA-Memorial Miquel Poblet
