= Aušrinė Trebaitė =

Lithuanian cyclist (born 1988)

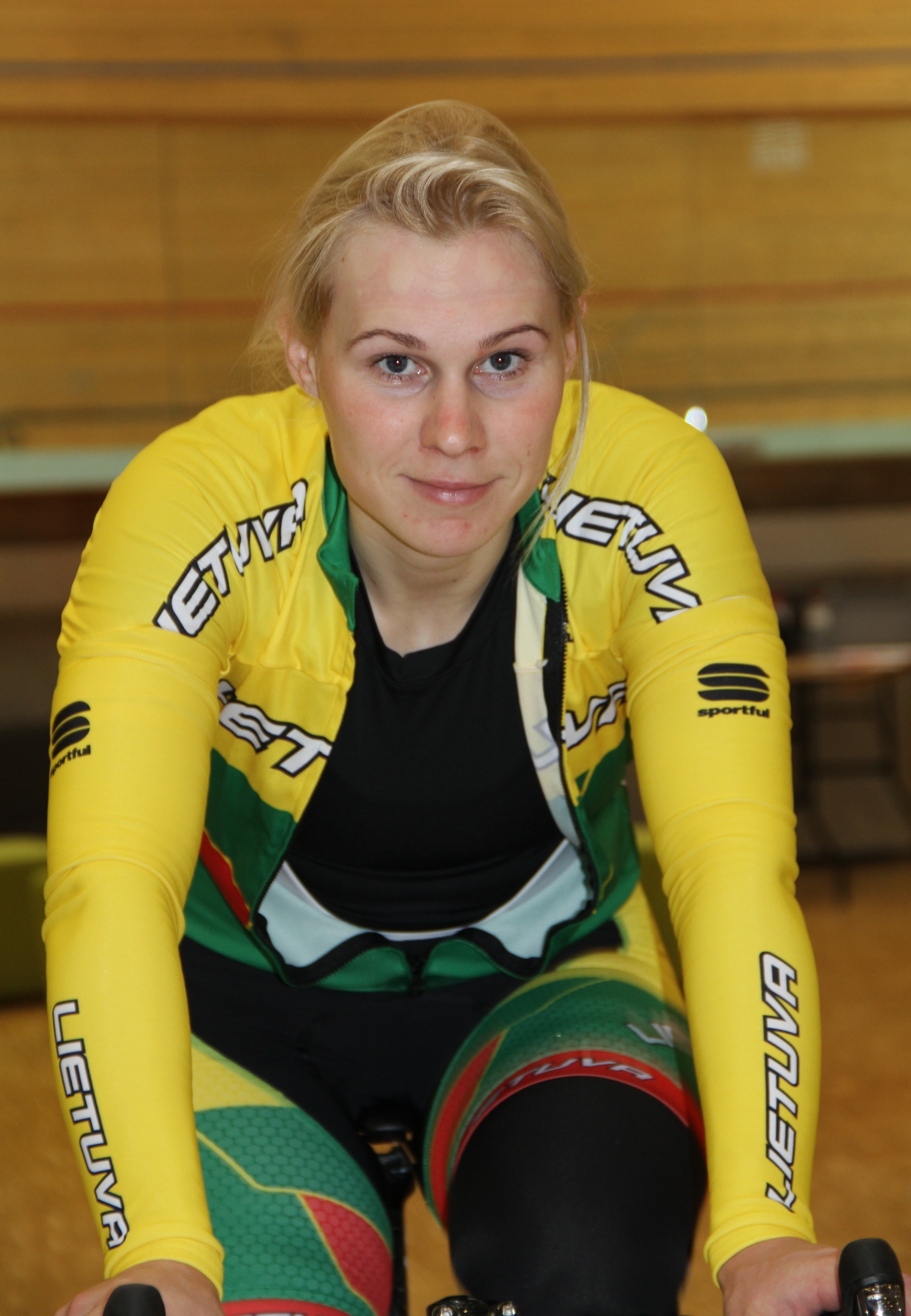
- Trebaitė in 2015

Personal information
- Full name: Aušrinė Trebaitė
- Born: 18 October 1988 (age 37)

Cycling career
- Sport: Cycling
- Current team: Retired
- Disciplines: Road; Track

Amateur teams
- 2007: Ausra Gruodis (guest)
- 2008: USC Chirio Forno d'Asolo
- 2008: Ausra Gruodis (guest)
- 2016: Planet X Bo-Go Cycling Team

Professional teams
- 2009: USC Chirio Forno d'Asolo
- 2010: Safi–Pasta Zara
- 2013: Chirio Forno d'Asolo
Medal record
Representing Lithuania
Women's road cycling
Universiade
| Gold medal – first place | 2011 Shenzhen | Team time trial |
Women's track cycling
European Championships
| Gold medal – first place | 2012 Panevėžys | Team pursuit |
| Gold medal – first place | 2012 Panevėžys | Omnium |
| Gold medal – first place | 2016 Yvelines | Scratch |
| Silver medal – second place | 2010 Pruszków | Team pursuit |
| Bronze medal – third place | 2015 Grenchen | Omnium |

Aušrinė Trebaitė (born 18 October 1988) is a Lithuanian former racing cyclist.

== Major results ==
=== Road cycling ===
2004
3rd Time trial, National Road Championships
2005
2nd Time trial, UEC European Junior Road Championships
2007
3rd Time trial, National Road Championships
2008
3rd Time trial, National Road Championships
6th Time trial, UEC European Under-23 Road Championships
2009
3rd Time trial, National Road Championships
2010
1st Road race, National Road Championships
3rd Road race, UEC European Under-23 Road Championships
10th Overall Tour de Feminin-O cenu Českého Švýcarska
2011
1st Team time trial, Summer Universiade
National Road Championships

1st Time trial
3rd Road race

2nd Overall Puchar Prezesa
2012
3rd Time trial, National Road Championships
2014
National Road Championships

1st Time trial
1st Road race

7th Overall Tour of Adygeya
2015
National Road Championships

1st Time trial
3rd Road race

2016
1st Time trial, National Road Championships

=== Track cycling ===
2009
3rd Team pursuit, 2009–10 UCI Track Cycling World Cup Classics, Cali
3rd Individual pursuit, UEC European Under-23 Track Championships
2010
2nd Scratch, 2009–10 UCI Track Cycling World Cup Classics, Beijing
2nd Team pursuit, UEC European Track Championships
2012
UEC European Track Championships

1st Team pursuit
1st Omnium

2013
1st Omnium, Panevėžys
2014
1st Omnium, Athens Track Grand Prix
Panevėžys

1st Omnium
2nd Points Race

2nd Omnium, International Belgian Open
2015
2nd Omnium, Panevėžys
3rd Omnium, UEC European Track Championships
3rd Omnium, Grand Prix Minsk
2016
1st Scratch, UEC European Track Championships
