= Edyta Jasińska =

Polish cyclist (born 1986)

Personal information
- Born: 28 November 1986 (age 39) Lubań, Poland

Cycling career
- Sport: Cycling
- Discipline: Track cycling
Medal record
European Championships
Silver medal – second place	2013 Apeldoorn	Team pursuit

Edyta Jasińska (born 28 November 1986) is a track cyclist from Poland. She represented her nation at the 2009, 2010, 2011, 2014 and 2015 UCI Track Cycling World Championships.

== Career results ==
2008
International Track Challenge Vienna

2nd Individual Pursuit
2nd Points Race

2009
3rd Individual Pursuit, International Track Challenge Vienna
2013
Grand Prix Vienna

2nd Individual Pursuit
2nd Points Race

2014
3rd Points Race, Grand Prix Galichyna
2015
1st Points Race, Panevėžys
2nd Points Race, Grand Prix Minsk
Grand Prix Galichyna

2nd Points Race
3rd Scratch Race

3rd Omnium, GP Prostějov – Memorial of Otmar Malecek
2016
Grand Prix of Poland

1st Team Pursuit (with Katarzyna Pawłowska, Natalia Rutkowska and Małgorzata Wojtyra)
2nd Scratch Race

Grand Prix Minsk

1st Points Race
3rd Omnium
3rd Scratch Race

Grand Prix Galichyna

1st Individual Pursuit
3rd Scratch Race
3rd Omnium
3rd 500m Time Trial

GP Czech Cycling Federation

2nd Points Race
3rd Scratch Race
