= Kelly Druyts =

Belgian cyclist (born 1989)

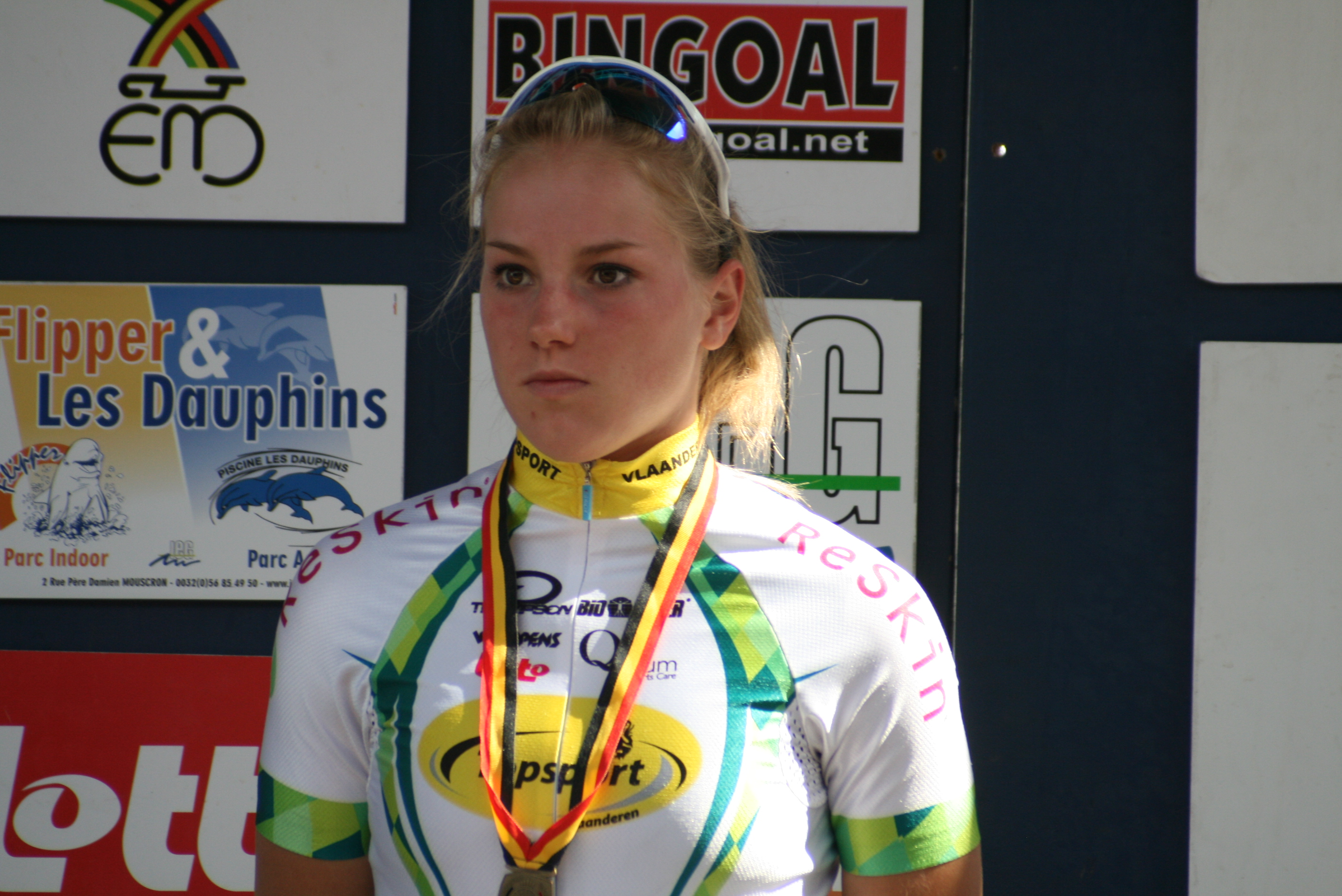
- Druyts in 2008

Personal information
- Full name: Kelly Druyts
- Born: 21 November 1989 (age 36) Wilrijk, Belgium
- Height: 1.67 m (5 ft 5 1/2 in)

Cycling career
- Sport: Cycling
- Current team: Chevalmeire
- Disciplines: Road; Track
- Role: Rider

Professional teams
- 2007: Lotto–Belisol Ladiesteam
- 2008–2017: Topsport Vlaanderen–Thompson Ladies Team
- 2018–2019: Doltcini–Van Eyck Sport
- 2020–2024: Chevalmeire Cycling Team

Major wins
- UCI World Scratch Race Championships (2014)

Kelly Druyts (born 21 November 1989) is a Belgian racing cyclist, who rode for UCI Women's Continental Team Chevalmeire. She finished in second place in the Belgian National Road Race Championships in 2010. She won a bronze medal in the scratch race at the 2012 UCI Track Cycling World Championships, and gold in the scratch race at the 2014 Championships.

Druyts is from a sporting family: her father, Ronny, played youth football with Beerschot AC and at the senior level with Dynamo Niel, where he was a champion in the Belgian Provincial leagues, her sister Steffy was a multiple national champion in gymnastics, and she is the sister of racing cyclists Jessy Druyts, Demmy Druyts, Lenny Druyts and Gerry Druyts. Kelly was a national champion in triathlon and duathlon before focussing on cycling.

== Major results ==
=== Road ===
2006
1st Grimbergen Juniors
2007
1st Hoogstraten-Wortel
2008
3rd Time trial, National Road Championships
2009
1st Road race, Brabant Provincial Road Championships
1st Incourt
1st Beauraing
3rd Road race, National Road Championships
3rd Omloop Het Nieuwsblad
4th Sparkassen Giro Bochum
9th Road race, UEC European Under-23 Road Championships
2010
2nd Road race, National Road Championships
10th Sparkassen Giro
2012
1st Road race, Antwerp Provincial Road Championships
6th Overall Belgium Tour
6th Omloop van het Hageland
2013
5th Erondegemse Pijl
6th Knokke-Heist – Bredene
7th Omloop van het Hageland
2014
1st Hillegemum
1st Stage 6 Trophée d'Or Féminin
1st Stage 4 Holland Ladies Tour
3rd Diamond Tour
7th Gooik–Geraardsbergen–Gooik
7th Sparkassen Giro Bochum
2015
2nd Diamond Tour
8th La Madrid Challenge by La Vuelta
2016
3rd Trofee Maarten Wynants
5th Erondegemse Pijl
8th Le Samyn des Dames
9th Diamond Tour
10th Grand Prix de Dottignies
2017
3rd Road race, National Road Championships
5th Grand Prix de Dottignies
10th Erondegemse Pijl
2018
1st Road race, Antwerp Provincial Road Championships
1st Stage 3 Panorama Guizhou International Women's Road Cycling Race
6th Overall Tour of Zhoushan Island

1st Stage 3

7th Brabantse Pijl
8th Omloop van Borsele
10th Overall Tour of Chongming Island
2019
4th Diamond Tour
5th Erondegemse Pijl
7th MerXem Classic
7th Grand Prix International d'Isbergues

=== Track ===
2007
National Track Championships

1st Individual pursuit
1st Keirin
1st Team sprint (with Jenifer De Merlier)
1st Points race

2009
1st Omnium, National Track Championships
2nd Team pursuit, UEC European Under-23 Track Championships (with Jolien D'Hoore and Jessie Daams)
2010
UEC European Under-23 Track Championships

1st Team pursuit (with Jolien D'Hoore and Jessie Daams)
2nd Scratch

2nd Scratch, 2010–11 UCI Track Cycling World Cup Classics, Cali
2011
1st Scratch, 2011–12 UCI Track Cycling World Cup, Cali
2012
3rd Scratch, UCI Track Cycling World Championships
2013
National Track Championships

1st 500m time trial
1st Points race

2nd Points race, Grand Prix of Poland
3rd Points race, International Belgian Open
2014
1st Scratch, UCI Track Cycling World Championships
Belgian Xmas Meetings

1st Points race
1st Scratch

2nd Points race, UEC European Track Championships
International Belgian Open

2nd Points race
3rd Scratch
