= Fiona Dutriaux =

French cyclist (born 1989)

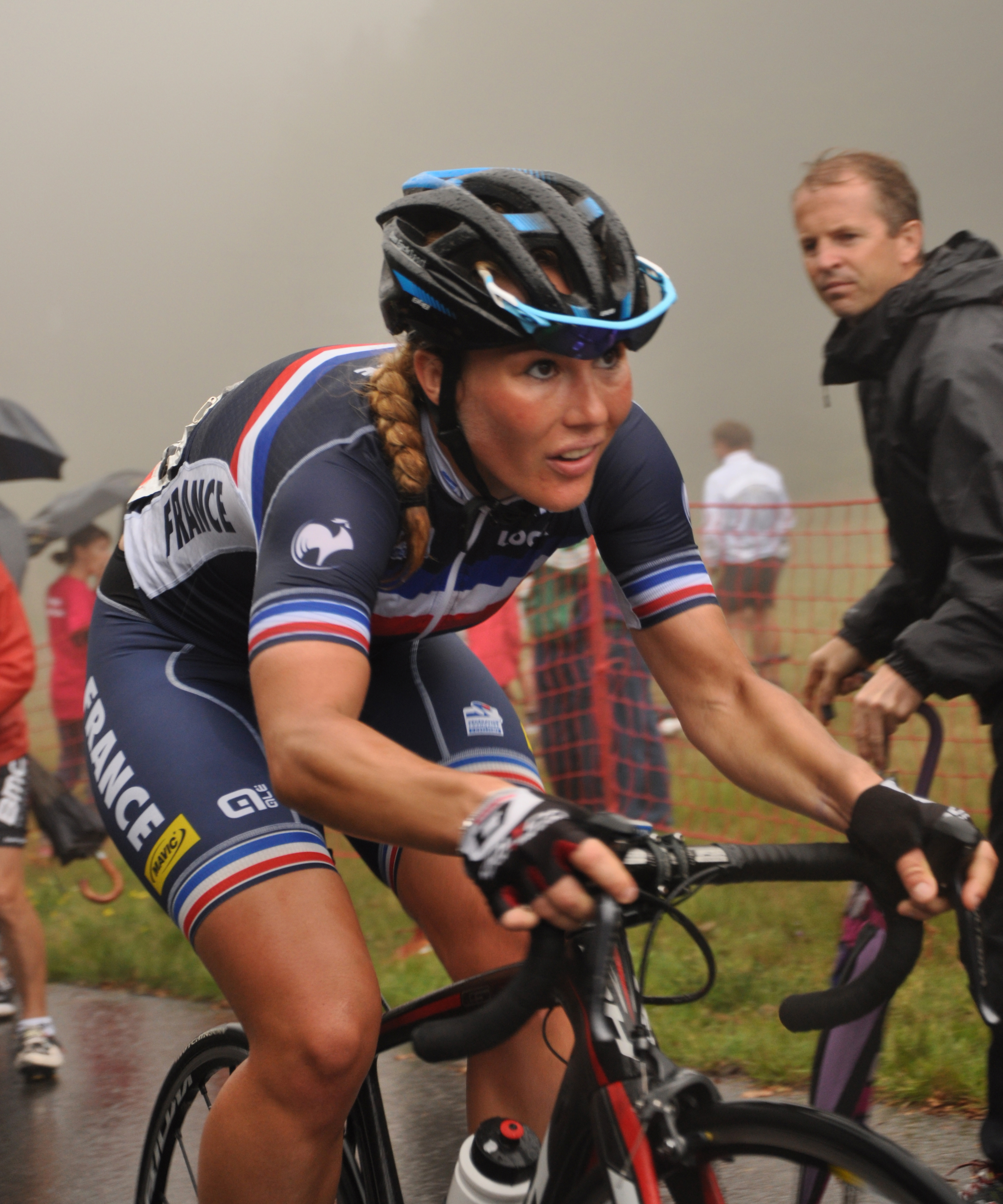
- Dutriaux in 2015

Personal information
- Born: 25 January 1989 (age 37) Croix, Nord, France

Cycling career
- Sport: Cycling
- Current team: Retired
- Disciplines: Road; Track
- Role: Rider

Amateur team
- 2015–2018: Autoglas Wetteren

Professional team
- 2007–2014: Vienne Futuroscope

Fiona Dutriaux (born 25 January 1989 in Croix) is a French former professional racing cyclist. On the track she competed in several world cups and European Championships. She won several medals at the French National Track Championships, including a gold in the scratch in 2009 and a gold in the points race in 2010. On the road, she rode for the Poitou-Charentes.Futuroscope.86 team between 2007 and 2014. Dutriaux represented her country in the road race at the 2015 European Games in Baku, Azerbaijan.

== Major results ==
2007
1st Individual pursuit, UEC European Junior Track Championships
2014
3rd Omnium, Open des Nations sur Piste de Roubaix
5th Diamond Tour
7th Erondegemse Pijl
2015
6th Diamond Tour
9th Dwars door Vlaanderen
