= Vaida Pikauskaitė =

Lithuanian racing cyclist (born 1991)

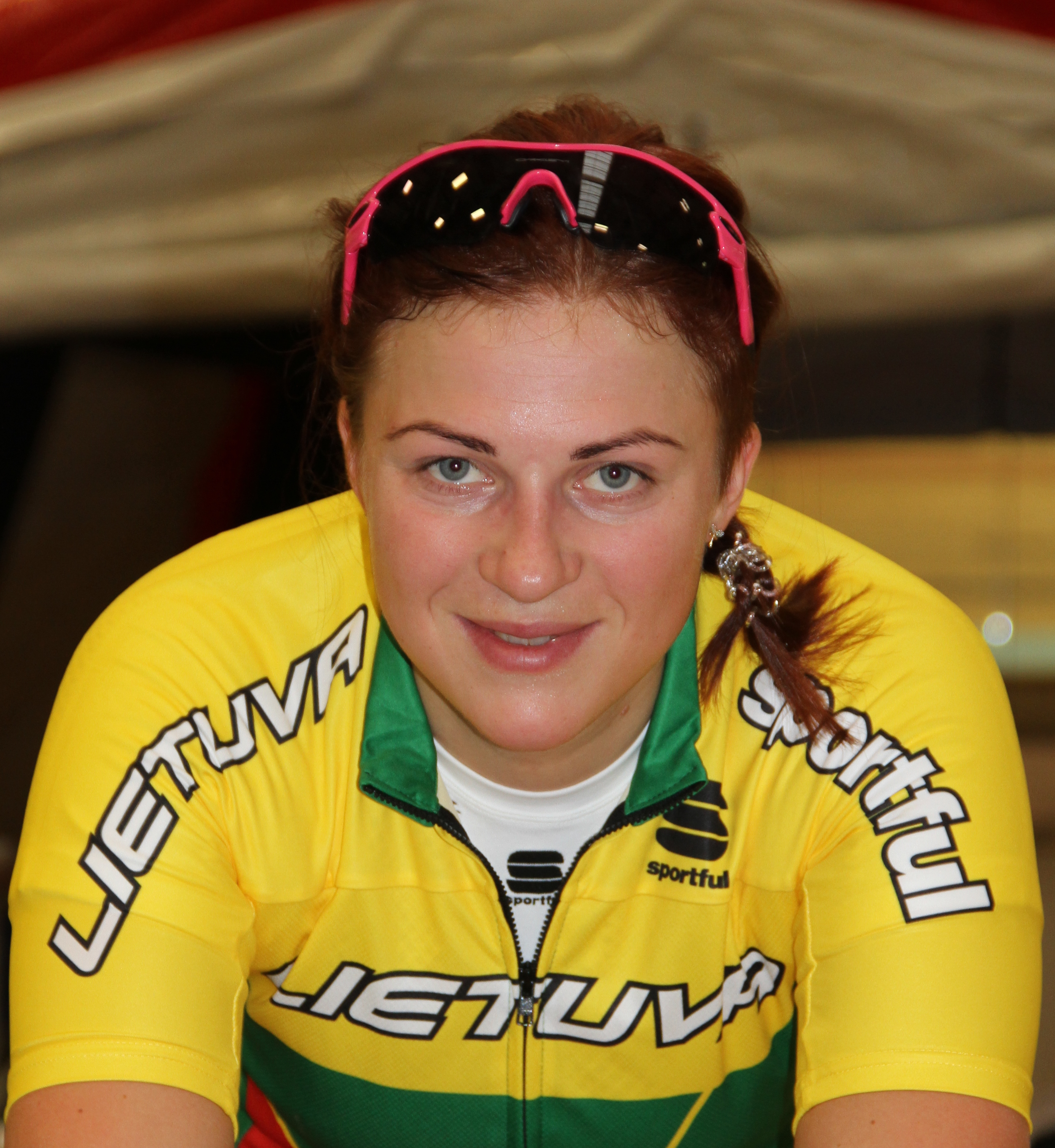
- Vaida Pikauskaitė (2015)

Personal information
- Full name: Vaida Pikauskaitė
- Born: 29 March 1991 (age 35)

Cycling career
- Sport: Cycling
- Discipline: track
Medal record
Representing Lithuania
Women's track cycling
European Championships
Gold medal – first place	2012 Panevėžys	Team pursuit
Silver medal – second place	2010 Pruszków	Team pursuit
European U23 Championships
Bronze medal – third place	2010 St. Petersburg	Individual pursuit

Vaida Pikauskaitė (born 29 March 1991) is a Lithuanian racing cyclist. She was part of the team who won the pursuit at the world championships in 2012.

== Major achievements ==
2010
Bronze, European U23 Championships, U23 Women's Individual Pursuit
Silver, European Championships, Women's Team Pursuit
2012
Gold, European Championships, Women's Team Pursuit
