= Giulia Donato =

Italian cyclist

Personal information
- Born: 26 September 1992 (age 34)

Cycling career
- Sport: Cycling
- Role: Rider

Giulia Donato (born 26 September 1992) is an Italian professional racing cyclist.

== Major results ==
2012
3rd Team Pursuit, UEC European U23 Track Championships (with Elena Cecchini, Maria Giulia Confalonieri and Chiara Vannucci)

== See also ==
- BePink-La Classica
