= Lucie Hochmann =

Czech cyclist (born 1991)

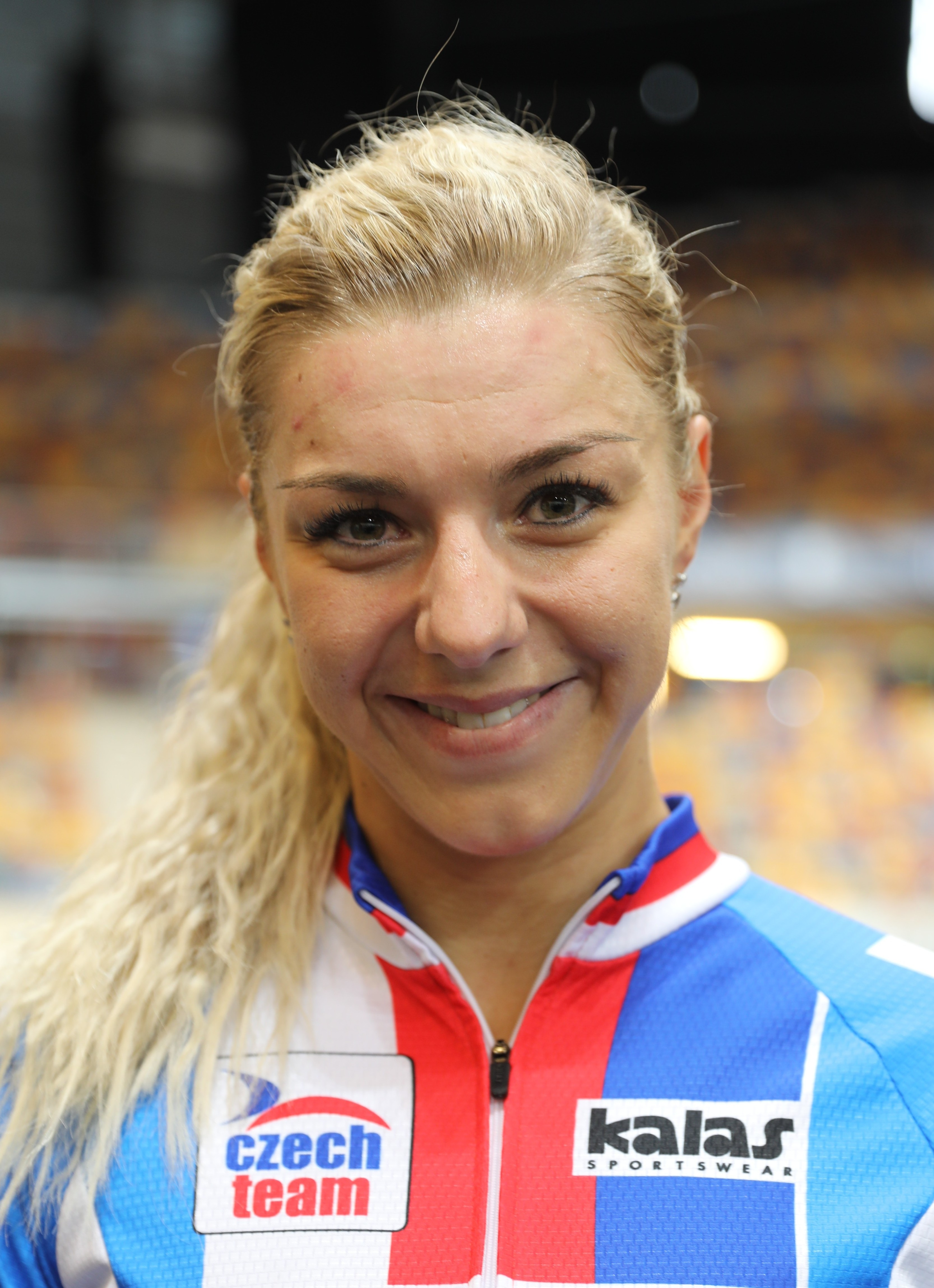
- Hochmann in 2019

Personal information
- Born: Lucie Záleská; 7 July 1991 (age 35) Podbořany, Czechoslovakia

Cycling career
- Sport: Cycling
- Discipline: Track cycling

Lucie Hochmann (née Záleská, born 7 July 1991) is a track cyclist from the Czech Republic. She represented her nation at the 2015 UCI Track Cycling World Championships. She competed at the 2016 UEC European Track Championships in the individual pursuit event.

== Major results ==
2010
2nd Individual Pursuit, UEC European U23 Track Championships
2012
UEC European U23 Track Championships

2nd Individual Pursuit
3rd Omnium

2013
1st Omnium, UIV Talents Cup Final (U23)
UEC European U23 Track Championships

3rd Individual Pursuit
3rd Omnium
3rd Scratch Race

2014
2nd Omnium, Grand Prix Minsk
3rd Omnium, GP Prostejov – Memorial of Otmar Malecek
Prova Internacional de Anadia

3rd Omnium
3rd Scratch Race

2015
2nd Omnium, GP Prostejov – Memorial of Otmar Malecek
2nd Omnium, Cottbuser Nächte
Trofeu Ciutat de Barcelona

2nd Points Race
3rd Scratch Race

3rd Omnium, Panevezys
2016
Grand Prix Vienna

1st Points Race
1st Scratch Race

Prostejov GP – Memorial of Otmar Malecek

1st Points Race
3rd Scratch Race

1st Omnium, 6 giorni delle rose – Fiorenzuola
1st Scratch Race, Prilba Moravy
1st Team Pursuit, GP Czech Cycling Federation (with Jarmila Machačová, Eva Pláničková and Ema Kankovská)
3 Jours d'Aigle

2nd Points Race
3rd Individual Pursuit

3rd Scratch Race, Grand Prix of Poland
2017
6 Giorni di Torino internazionale

2nd Omnium
3rd Points Race

3rd Madison, Öschelbronn (with Jarmila Machačová)
