= Małgorzata Wojtyra =

Polish cyclist

Personal information
- Born: 21 September 1989 (age 36) Szczecin, Poland
Medal record
World Championships
Silver medal – second place	2016 London	Individual pursuit
European Championships
Silver medal – second place	2012 Panevėžys	Team pursuit
Silver medal – second place	2013 Apeldoorn	Team pursuit
Bronze medal – third place	2010 Pruszków	Omnium

Małgorzata Wojtyra (born 21 September 1989) is a Polish track cyclist. At the 2012 Summer Olympics, she competed in the Women's Omnium, finishing in 11th place overall.

== Career results ==
2008
3rd Scratch Race, International Track Challenge Vienna
2009
International Track Challenge Vienna

1st Points Race
1st Scratch Race

2nd Scratch Race, UEC European U23 Track Championships
2010
UEC European U23 Track Championships

2nd Omnium, UEC European U23 Track Championships
2nd Team Pursuit (with Renata Dąbrowska and Katarzyna Pawłowska)

2011
UEC European U23 Track Championships

1st Omnium
2nd Scratch Race
2nd Team Pursuit (with Eugenia Alickun and Katarzyna Pawłowska)
3rd Team Sprint (with Natalia Rutkowska)

2013
Grand Prix of Poland

2nd Omnium
3rd Points Race

2014
Panevėžys

1st Points Race
3rd Omnium
3rd Scratch Race

1st Omnium, GP Prostějov – Memorial of Otmar Malecek
Grand Prix of Poland

2nd Points Race
3rd Scratch Race

Grand Prix Galichyna

2nd Points Race
3rd Omnium

2015
International Belgian Open

1st Individual Pursuit
2nd Scratch Race
3rd Points Race

1st Omnium, Six Days of Ghent
2nd Omnium, Open des Nations sur Piste de Roubaix
3rd Scratch Race, Grand Prix of Poland
2016
1st Team Pursuit, Grand Prix of Poland (with Edyta Jasińska, Katarzyna Pawłowska and Natalia Rutkowska)
2nd Scratch Race, Fenioux Piste International
3rd Points Race, Revolution Series, Round 6 – Manchester
