= Jarmila Machačová =

Czech cyclist

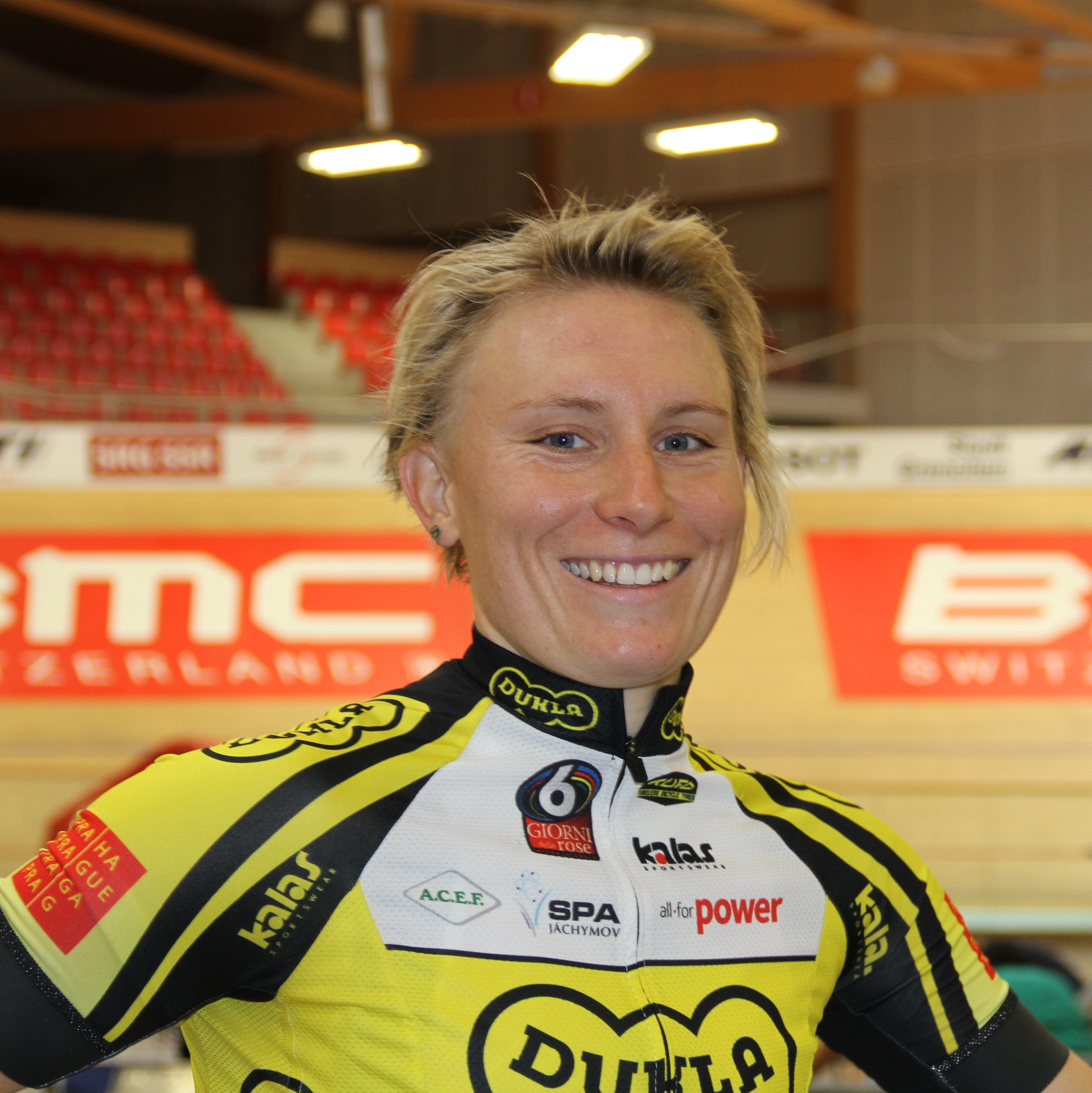
- Machačová at the 2015 UEC European Track Championships

Personal information
- Born: 9 January 1986 (age 40): Havlíčkův Brod, Czechoslovakia; (now Czech Republic)

Cycling career
- Sport: Cycling
- Disciplines: Road; Track
- Role: Rider

Amateur team
- 2010: Dolmans Landscaping Team

Professional teams
- 2006–2009: ASC Dukla Praha
- 2018: Team Dukla Praha
Medal record
Women's track cycling
Representing Czech Republic
World Championships
Gold medal – first place	2013 Minsk	Points race
Silver medal – second place	2011 Apeldoorn	Points race
European Games
Bronze medal – third place	2019 Minsk	Points race
European Championships
Bronze medal – third place	2011 Apeldoorn	Points race
Bronze medal – third place	2024 Apeldoorn	Points race

Jarmila Machačová (born 9 January 1986) is a Czech professional racing cyclist.

== Major results ==
=== Road ===
2006
3rd Time trial, National Road Championships
3rd Zingem
3rd Belsele-Puivelde
3rd De Klinge
2007
2nd Road race, National Road Championships
3rd Wiener Radfest
2008
National Road Championships

1st Time trial
2nd Road race

2nd ELK Heurigen Grand Prix
2009
National Road Championships

3rd Time trial
3rd Road race

7th Overall Tour de Feminin-O cenu Českého Švýcarska
2011
National Road Championships

3rd Time trial
3rd Road race

2012
1st Time trial, National Road Championships
2015
2nd Time trial, National Road Championships
2016
2nd Time trial, National Road Championships
2017
National Road Championships

2nd Time trial
3rd Road race

6th VR Women
9th Overall Gracia–Orlová

1st Mountains classification
1st Active rider classification

2018
National Road Championships

1st Road race
2nd Time trial

8th VR Women ITT
2019
National Road Championships

2nd Time trial
3rd Road race

2nd Pannonhalma, V4 Ladies Series
2020
1st Road race, National Road Championships
2021
2nd Time trial, National Road Championships

=== Track ===
2006
2nd Scratch, 2005–06 UCI Track Cycling World Cup Classics, Sydney
3rd Points race, UEC European Under-23 Track Championships
2007
3rd Scratch, UEC European Under-23 Track Championships
3rd Points race, 2007–08 UCI Track Cycling World Cup Classics, Sydney
2008
2007–08 UCI Track Cycling World Cup Classics

1st Points race, Los Angeles
2nd Scratch, Copenhagen

2009
1st Points race, 2008–09 UCI Track Cycling World Cup Classics, Beijing
International Track Challenge Vienna

3rd Individual pursuit
3rd Points race
3rd Scratch

2010
1st Points race, Melbourne
3rd Omnium, Grand Prix Vienna
2011
2nd Points race, UCI Track Cycling World Championships
3rd Points race, UEC European Track Championships
2012
2nd Scratch, 2011–12 UCI Track Cycling World Cup, London
2012–13 UCI Track Cycling World Cup, Cali

2nd Scratch
3rd Omnium

2013
1st Points race, UCI Track Cycling World Championships
UCI Track Cycling World Ranking

1st Overall Points race
1st Overall Scratch

2nd Points race, 2012–13 UCI Track Cycling World Cup, Aguascalientes
3rd Points race, 2013–14 UCI Track Cycling World Cup, Aguascalientes
2014
2nd Points race, Grand Prix Minsk
2015
GP Czech Cycling Federation

1st Points race
1st Scratch
2nd 500m time trial

Trofeu Ciutat de Barcelona

1st Points race
1st Scratch

2016
1st Scratch, Six Days of Bremen
Prostejov GP - Memorial of Otmar Malecek

1st Scratch
3rd Points race

GP Czech Cycling Federation

1st Team pursuit (with Lucie Hochmann, Eva Planickova and Ema Kankovska)
3rd Points race

2nd Points race, Grand Prix Vienna
3rd Points race, 2016–17 UCI Track Cycling World Cup, Apeldoorn
2017
1st Scratch, Six Days of Bremen
1st Madison, Finale 4 Bahnen Tournee (with Lucie Hochmann)
2nd Points race, Track Cycling Challenge
3rd Points race, 2017–18 UCI Track Cycling World Cup, Milton
3rd Madison, 2. Etappe 4 Bahnen tournee (with Lucie Hochmann)
2019
3rd Points race, European Games
2020
National Track Championships

1st Points race
1st Team pursuit
2nd Individual pursuit
3rd Scratch

2021
National Track Championships (February)

1st Omnium
2nd Elimination race
2nd Madison (with Dagmar Hejhalová)

National Track Championships (December)

1st Team pursuit
2nd Elimination race
2nd Omnium
