= Avanti (bicycle company) =

New Zealand bicycle manufacturer

- Type: Private
- Industry: Cycling
- Founder: John Struthers
- Headquarters: New Zealand
- Products: Bicycles
- Owner: Sheppard Cycles
- Website: avantibikes.com

Avanti Bikes is a company originating from New Zealand that distributes bicycles to many countries within Oceania, Asia and Europe.

Avanti put its first bicycle into the New Zealand market in 1985 and since then has built its range to 100+ models catering for all areas of cycling from kids bikes right through to Olympic bikes. In 1991 Avanti went over the Tasman Sea and set up a sister company in Australia which has been well adopted in the market.

== History ==
=== 1980s ===
The Avanti bicycle company produced its first bicycle in 1985 it was a "locally assembled 10 speed Strada series". After the success of their road bike Avanti saw that there was demand for others types of bikes. So in 1986 Avanti produced their first time trial bicycle. In 1987 the mountain bike also found its way into the Avanti arsenal.

=== 1990s ===
In 1991 Avanti bicycles successfully expanded into the Australian market and entered into a decade of innovation. Avanti produced many new types of bicycles including; trail bikes, downhill bikes and carbon-fibre bikes.

=== 2000s ===
In the year 2000 Avanti had a range of 27 different models. The innovation in the road bicycle industry has led to Avanti producing bikes with many carbon components. In 2004 two New Zealand athletes won medals at the Olympics riding Avanti bikes. In 2007 Avanti expanded to the Chinese and Singaporean markets.

=== 2010s ===
Avanti expanded more into the Asian market with Thailand, Japan and Malaysia all having professional athletes ride their bikes. In 2015 Avanti celebrated 30 years of making bicycles.

==== Sinch Bikes ====
In 2019, Kim Struthers, the son of Avanti founder John Struthers founded Sinch Bikes, which focuses on e-bikes and other types of bicycles.

== Sponsorship and victories ==
=== Sponsorship ===
Avanti has supported New Zealand athletes at the Olympics. Professional teams that have been supported by Avanti include; the Avanti Racing Team, Subway-Avanti, PureBlack Racing and Savings & Loans Cycling Team.

Avanti is the official bicycle of the New Zealand Track Racing Team.

=== Victories ===
2004
1st Olympic Triathlon, Hamish Carter
1st Women's individual pursuit, Sarah Ulmer
2008
1st World Omnium Championships, Hayden Godfrey
2009
1st Women's individual pursuit, Alison Shanks
2012
1st Women's individual pursuit, Alison Shanks

== See also ==
- List of Australian bicycle brands and manufacturers
