= 2007 UCI Track Cycling World Championships – Women's individual pursuit =

Women's individual pursuit at the 2007 UCI Track Cycling World Championships
- Venue: Palma Arena
- Location: Palma de Mallorca, Spain
- Date: 30 March 2007
- Winning time: 3:30.213

Medalists
gold medal	Sarah Hammer	United States
silver medal	Rebecca Romero	Great Britain
bronze medal	Katie Mactier	Australia

The Women's Individual Pursuit was one of the 7 women's events at the 2007 UCI Track Cycling World Championships, held in Palma de Mallorca, Spain.

24 Cyclists from 17 countries participated in the contest. After the qualification, the fastest 2 riders advanced to the Final and the 3rd and 4th best riders raced for the bronze medal.

The qualification took place on 30 March and the Finals later the same day.

== World record ==
World Record
WR	3:24.537	Sarah Ulmer (NZL)	Athens (Greece)	22 August 2004

== Qualifying ==
Rank	Name	1000m	2000m	Time	Speed (km/h)	Q
Rank	Name	1000m	1000–2000	2000–3000	Speed (km/h)	Q
1	Sarah Hammer (USA)	1:12.611 (2)	2:21.024 (1)	3:31.359	51.097	QF
1	Sarah Hammer (USA)		1:06.413 (1)	1:10.335 (2)		
2	Rebecca Romero (GBR)	1:13.093 (5)	2:21.995 (3)	3:31.894	50.968	QF
2	Rebecca Romero (GBR)		1:06.902 (2)	1:09.899 (1)		
3	Katie Mactier (AUS)	1:11.482 (1)	2:21.846 (2)	3:35.033	50.224	QB
3	Katie Mactier (AUS)		1:10.364 (5)	1:13.187 (11)		
4	Wendy Houvenaghel (GBR)	1:13.098 (6)	2:24.172 (4)	3:35.289	50.165	QB
4	Wendy Houvenaghel (GBR)		1:11.074 (7)	1:11.117 (3)		
5	Karin Thürig (SUI)	1:14.939 (12)	2:24.484 (5)	3:36.126	49.970	
5	Karin Thürig (SUI)		1:09.545 (3)	1:11.642 (6)		
6	María Luisa Calle (COL)	1:15.296 (14)	2:25.427 (10)	3:36.971	49.776	
6	María Luisa Calle (COL)		1:10.131 (4)	1:11.544 (5)		
7	Lesya Kalytovska (UKR)	1:13.776 (9)	2:25.675 (11)	3:37.334	49.693	
7	Lesya Kalytovska (UKR)		1:11.899 (14)	1:11.659 (7)		
8	Alison Shanks (NZL)	1:14.033 (10)	2:24.781 (7)	3:37.710	49.607	
8	Alison Shanks (NZL)		1:10.748 (6)	1:12.929 (10)		
9	Verena Joos (GER)	1:15.458 (15)	2:26.860 (13)	3:38.821	49.335	
9	Verena Joos (GER)		1:11.402 (9)	1:11.961 (8)		
10	Lada Kozlíková (CZE)	1:13.029 (4)	2:24.813 (8)	3:39.295	49.248	
10	Lada Kozlíková (CZE)		1:11.784 (11)	1:14.482 (13)		
11	Vilija Sereikaitė (LTU)	1:12.739 (3)	2:24.586 (6)	3:40.412	48.999	
11	Vilija Sereikaitė (LTU)		1:11.847 (13)	1:15.826 (18)		
12	Larissa Kleinmann (GER)	1:14.128 (11)	2:26.133 (12)	3:40.727	48.929	
12	Larissa Kleinmann (GER)		1:11.366 (12)	1:14.264 (13)		
13	Katherine Bates (AUS)	1:13.676 (7)	2:25.005 (9)	3:40.771	42.919	
13	Katherine Bates (AUS)		1:11.329 (8)	1:15.776 (17)		
14	Cathy Moncassin Prime (FRA)	1:16.497 (20)	2:29.545 (19)	3:40.984	48.872	
14	Cathy Moncassin Prime (FRA)		1:13.048 (17)	1:11.439 (4)		
15	Trine Schmidt (DEN)	1:15.539 (16)	2:27.980 (15)	3:41.280	48.806	
15	Trine Schmidt (DEN)		1:11.598 (13)	1:14.578 (15)		
16	Leire Olaberria (ESP)	1:18.158 (24)	2:30.001 (20)	3:41.972	48.654	
16	Leire Olaberria (ESP)		1:11.843 (12)	1:11.971 (9)		
17	Marlijn Binnendijk (NED)	1:16.864 (21)	2:28.329 (16)	3:43.343	48.356	
17	Marlijn Binnendijk (NED)		1:11.465 (10)	1:15.014 (15)		
18	Olga Slyusareva (RUS)	1:13.711 (8)	2:27.504 (14)	3:43.759	48.266	
18	Olga Slyusareva (RUS)		1:13.793 (20)	1:16.255 (22)		
19	Yelyzaveta Bochkaryova (UKR)	1:15.743 (17)	2:29.265 (17)	3:44.680	48.068	
19	Yelyzaveta Bochkaryova (UKR)		1:13.522 (19)	1:15.415 (16)		
20	Li Meifang (CHN)	1:16.321 (18)	2:29.496 (18)	3:45.651	47.861	
20	Li Meifang (CHN)		1:13.175 (18)	1:16.155 (21)		
21	Martina Růžičková (CZE)	1:15.180 (13)	2:30.247 (21)	3:46.193	47.746	
21	Martina Růžičková (CZE)		1:15.067 (21)	1:15.946 (19)		
22	Anita Valen (NOR)	1:17.939 (23)	2:33.270 (23)	3:49.392	47.080	
22	Anita Valen (NOR)		1:15.331 (23)	1:16.122 (20)		
23	Wang Li (CHN)	1:17.005 (22)	2:33.320 (24)	3:49.943	46.968	
23	Wang Li (CHN)		1:16.315 (24)	1:16.623 (23)		
24	Neva Day (USA)	1:16.395 (19)	2:31.566 (22)	3:50.997	46.753	
24	Neva Day (USA)		1:15.171 (22)	1:19.431 (24)		

== Finals ==
Rank	Name	1000m	2000m	Time	Speed (km/h)
Rank	Name	1000m	1000–2000	2000–3000	Speed (km/h)
Gold Medal Race
	Sarah Hammer (USA)	1:11.785 (1)	2:20.118 (1)	3:30.213	51.376
	Sarah Hammer (USA)		1:08.333 (1)	1:10.095 (1)	
	Rebecca Romero (GBR)	1:12.415 (2)	2:21.884 (2)	3:33.409	50.607
	Rebecca Romero (GBR)		1:09.469 (2)	1:11.525 (2)	
Bronze Medal Race
	Katie Mactier (AUS)	1:12.505 (1)	2:23.104 (1)	3:36.306	49.929
	Katie Mactier (AUS)		1:10.599 (1)	1:13.202 (1)	
4	Wendy Houvenaghel (GBR)	1:12.818 (2)	2:25.072 (2)	3:37.406	49.676
4	Wendy Houvenaghel (GBR)		1:12.254 (2)	1:12.334 (2)	
