= Cycling at the 2008 Summer Olympics – Women's individual pursuit =

Women's individual pursuit at the Games of the XXIX Olympiad
- Olympic Track cycling
- Venue: Laoshan Velodrome
- Dates: August 15 (preliminaries); August 16 (semifinals); August 17 (final)
- Competitors: 13 from 11 nations
- Winning time: 3:28.321

Medalists
1st place, gold medalist(s)		Rebecca Romero	Great Britain
2nd place, silver medalist(s)		Wendy Houvenaghel	Great Britain
3rd place, bronze medalist(s)		Lesya Kalytovska	Ukraine

The women's individual pursuit at the 2008 Summer Olympics took place on August 17 at the Laoshan Velodrome.

The first round of this track cycling event consisted of head-to-head races over a 3000 m distance, but with the results being treated as time trial results rather than elimination rounds. The top eight times from the first round qualified the cyclists for the elimination round, so that in each first round race neither or one or both of the cyclists would move on. In the match round, the eight cyclists were paired off according to the seeding from the first round. The winner of each match round match advanced to the final, while the four losers were given final rankings (5th through 8th) based on their times in the match round. The four finalists were placed into the gold medal match and bronze medal match based on their times in the match round.

== Competition format ==
The thirteen cyclists were matched into six two-rider heats and one heat of a single rider in the preliminary round. The eight riders with the fastest recorded times progressed to the match rounds.

In the match round, the top eight riders from the preliminaries were matched together, 1 vs. 8, 2 vs. 7, 3 vs. 6, and 4 vs. 5, for the semifinals. In the semifinals, the winner of each match advanced to race for a medal; the two fastest raced for gold and silver, while the two slower winners faced each other for the bronze.

== Schedule ==
All times are China standard time (UTC+8)

Date	Time	Round
Friday, 15 August 2008	18:00	Qualification
Saturday, 16 August 2008	17:05	Match round
Sunday, 17 August 2008	17:05	Final

== Results ==
=== Qualification ===
Rank	Heat	Cyclist	Nation	Result	Notes
1	6	Wendy Houvenaghel	Great Britain	3:28.443	Q
2	7	Rebecca Romero	Great Britain	3:28.641	Q
3	5	Lesya Kalytovska	Ukraine	3:31.942	Q
4	5	Alison Shanks	New Zealand	3:34.312	Q
5	6	Sarah Hammer	United States	3:35.471	Q
6	4	Vilija Sereikaitė	Lithuania	3:36.063	Q
7	7	Katie Mactier	Australia	3:38.178	Q
8	2	Lada Kozlíková	Czech Republic	3:39.561	Q
9	3	Karin Thürig	Switzerland	3:40.862	
10	4	María Luisa Calle	Colombia	3:41.175	
11	3	Verena Jooss	Germany	3:44.480	
12	2	Svetlana Pauliukaitė	Lithuania	3:45.691	
13	1	Evelyn García	El Salvador	3:56.849	

=== Match rounds ===
==== Semifinals ====
Qualification rule: Two fastest cyclists advance to the gold medal match (Q), while the next two to the bronze medal match (q).

Rank	Heat	Cyclist	Nation	Result	Notes
1	3	Rebecca Romero	Great Britain	3:27.703	Q
2	4	Wendy Houvenaghel	Great Britain	3:27.829	Q
3	2	Lesya Kalytovska	Ukraine	3:31.785	q
4	1	Alison Shanks	New Zealand	3:32.478	q
5	1	Sarah Hammer	United States	3:34.237	
6	2	Vilija Sereikaitė	Lithuania	3:36.808	
7	3	Katie Mactier	Australia	LAP	
8	4	Lada Kozlíková	Czech Republic	DNF	

==== Medal round ====
Bronze medal match

Rank	Cyclist	Nation	Result	Notes
3rd place, bronze medalist(s)	Lesya Kalytovska	Ukraine	3:31.413	
4	Alison Shanks	New Zealand	3:34.156	

Gold medal match

Rank	Cyclist	Nation	Result	Notes
1st place, gold medalist(s)	Rebecca Romero	Great Britain	3:28.321	
2nd place, silver medalist(s)	Wendy Houvenaghel	Great Britain	3:30.395	
