= Radau (disambiguation) =

Radau is a river in Lower Saxony, Germany.

Radau may also refer to:

- Rodolphe Radau (1835–1911), German astronomer and mathematician
- Radau (crater), impact crater on Mars
- Radawie (German Radau), a village in southwestern Poland
- "Radau", a song by God Is an Astronaut on the album Far from Refuge
