= Borowiany =

Borowiany refers to the following places in Poland:

- Borowiany, Opole Voivodeship
- Borowiany, Silesian Voivodeship
