= Yue Chen =

Yue Chen may refer to:

- Chen Yue (born 1989), Chinese track cyclist
- Yue Lin (樂綝), mid 3rd-century Chinese governor of Yangzhou, son of Yue Jin
