= Rebecca Romero =

British rower and racing cyclist

Rebecca Romero MBE
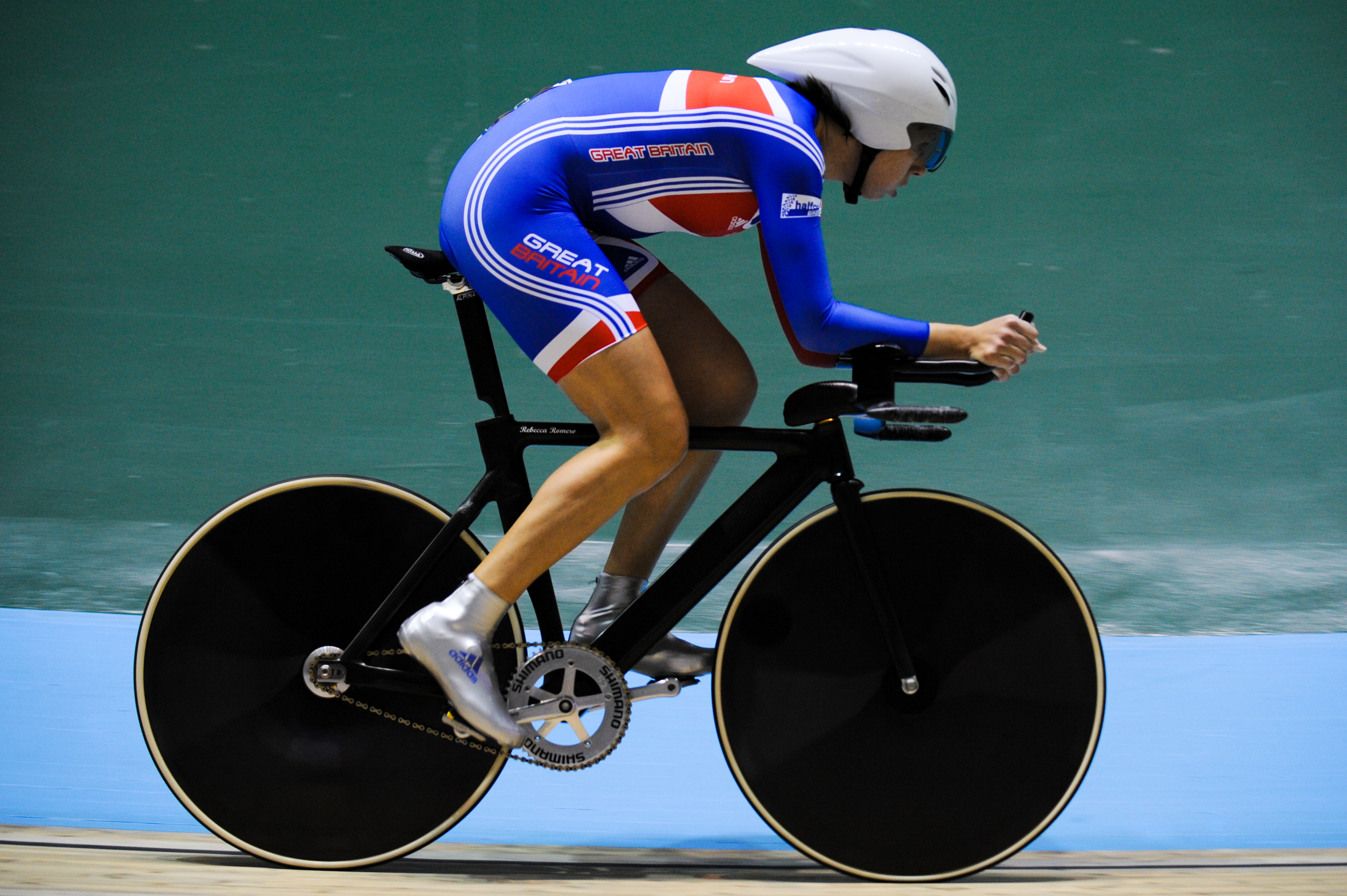
- Romero at the World Championships in 2008

Personal information
- Full name: Rebecca Jayne Romero
- Born: 24 January 1980 (age 46) Carshalton, England
- Height: 182 cm (6 ft 0 in)
- Weight: 73 kg (161 lb)

Cycling career
- Sport: Cycling
- Disciplines: Track & Road
- Role: Rider
- Rider type: TT / Pursuit
Medal record
Representing Great Britain
Women's rowing
Olympic Games
Silver medal – second place	2004 Athens	Quadruple sculls
World Championships
Gold medal – first place	2005 Gifu	Quadruple sculls
Women's track cycling
Olympic Games
Gold medal – first place	2008 Beijing	Individual pursuit
World Championships
Gold medal – first place	2008 Manchester	Individual pursuit
Gold medal – first place	2008 Manchester	Team pursuit
Silver medal – second place	2007 Palma de Mallorca	Individual pursuit

Rebecca Jayne Romero (born 24 January 1980) is a British sportswoman, a former world champion and Olympic Games silver medallist in rowing, and a former world and Olympic champion in track cycling. She was the first British woman, and the second woman globally to win Olympic medals in two distinctly different sports.

Romero took up rowing aged 17 and was selected by Great Britain for the Junior World Championships eight months later. She recorded successive top-5 finishes at the 2001, 2002 and 2003 World Rowing Championships, before winning a silver medal in the quadruple sculls at the 2004 Summer Olympics. Her team also won the overall World Rowing Cup title that year. In 2005, her crew became world champions in the quadruple sculls, but a persistent back injury forced her retirement from the sport in 2006.

Romero switched to cycling and won the 2006 British National Time Trial Championships in her first competitive race. She won a silver medal in the individual pursuit at the 2007 UCI Track Cycling World Championships, before winning both the individual and team pursuit world titles in 2008. She won an Olympic gold medal in the individual pursuit that year, before the discipline was removed from the Olympic programme the following year. She retired from cycling in 2011.

== Life and career ==
=== Early life and rowing ===
Rebecca Jayne Romero was born in Carshalton, England, on 24 January 1980 to an English mother and a Spanish father. She was brought up in Wallington, London, where she attended Wallington High School for Girls. Romero took up rowing at the age of 17 when she moved to Twickenham, London, and joined Kingston Rowing Club. A coach at the club helped fund her ambitions. She described how her training could be challenging, with bricks thrown at her; fishermen and residents of houseboats felt rowers caused a disturbance on the water. She was named by Great Britain in their squad for the Junior World Championships eight months after taking up the sport.

After winning a gold medal in the pairs at the U23 World Championships in 2000, Romero finished fifth in the quadruple sculls at both the 2001 and 2002 World Rowing Championships. At the 2003 World Rowing Championships in Milan, Romero and Debbie Flood finished fourth in the double sculls. In 2004, Romero, Frances Houghton, Alison Mowbray and Flood won the quadruple sculls at World Rowing Cup events in Poznań and Lucerne. Their victory in Lucerne meant they ended the 2004 World Cup series as overall champions. The same four then won the Princess Grace Trophy at the Henley Royal Regatta, ending the race almost three boat lengths ahead of runners-up Ukraine.

At the 2004 Summer Olympics in Athens, Romero won a silver medal in the quadruple sculls again competing with Houghton, Mowbray and Flood. The quartet finished half-a-boats-length behind Germany who were undefeated in the event since 1988. The following year, she was a member of the British crew that won a World Cup race in Munich, before missing the race in Lucerne through injury. Romero became a world champion at the 2005 World Rowing Championships in Japan. Competing alongside Houghton, Sarah Winckless and Katherine Grainger in the quadruple sculls, the British team finished 0.34 seconds ahead of second-placed Germany. The German crew lost time after momentarily tangling with a buoy. Suffering from a back injury, Romero retired from rowing in early 2006.

=== Switch to cycling ===
After contemplating a career in marketing, Romero became a racing cyclist after British Cycling contacted her in April 2006 to see if she was interested in giving the sport a try. She began training with High Wycombe Cycling Club, and in September that year, in her first competitive cycling race, she won the British National Time Trial Championships. She finished 15 seconds ahead of second-placed Wendy Houvenaghel. The following month, Romero was beaten by Houvenaghel to the national individual pursuit title. She won silver medals in the individual pursuit at the Track Cycling World Cup events in Moscow and Manchester, losing to Houvenaghel on both occasions.

Romero won her first UCI Track Cycling World Championships medal in March 2007 with silver in the individual pursuit. She was defeated by American rider Sarah Hammer in the final who finished over three seconds ahead of her. Later that year, Romero became the national champion in the individual pursuit. Competing in the same discipline in the 2007–08 World Cup, Romero won silver in Beijing and a gold medal in Copenhagen. It was her first victory at a Track Cycling World Cup event and she defeated Vilija Sereikaitė of South Africa in the final.

The following year, at the 2008 UCI Track Cycling World Championships in Manchester, Romero won the individual pursuit, overcoming Hammer in the final. Her success meant that she had become a world champion in two different sports across a three-year period. She described her victory as the most mentally testing experience she had ever faced. Later in the competition, Romero, riding with Houvenaghel and Joanna Rowsell, also achieved victory in the team pursuit. After setting a world-best time of 3:25.725 during the qualifying rounds, the trio defeated Ukraine in the final by over seven seconds.

Romero appeared nude on her bicycle in an advert for Powerade in the run up to the 2008 Summer Olympics. At the Games, Romero became the first-ever British woman, and the second Briton overall, after swimmer and water polo athlete Paulo Radmilovic, to win Olympic medals in two different sports at the Summer Olympics when she won the individual pursuit in Beijing. In winning the gold medal, she also became only the second woman of any country, after swimmer and handball player Roswitha Krause of East Germany, to win a Summer Olympic medal in two distinctly different sports. She won her semi-final against Australia's Katie Mactier in a British record time of 3:27.703, before defeating her compatriot Houvenaghel in the final with an advantage of over two seconds. She also finished eleventh in the points race.

=== Post-Beijing ===
In August 2009, Romero attempted the 874-mile non-stop mixed tandem bicycle record attempt from Land's End to John O'Groats with rower James Cracknell, but the pair were forced to abandon their attempt after completing 560 miles due to a knee injury incurred by Romero. Having not competed for a year, she was expected to return to track cycling in October 2009. This did not materialise amid speculation that the individual pursuit would be omitted from the Olympic programme. It was announced in December 2009 that the event would be dropped, meaning Romero was unable to defend her title at the 2012 Summer Olympics in London. She condemned the decision as "ludicrous".

At this point, Romero considered switching to road cycling full-time in an attempt to extend her cycling career. In February 2010, she joined the Orbea cycling team, with the aim of competing in the time trial at the 2010 UCI Road World Championships in Melbourne. This proved unsuccessful and she switched her focus to the team pursuit. She helped Orbea finish second in this discipline at the 2010 British National Track Championships, but an injury led to her absence at a World Cup race in Manchester the following year. Romero was not selected for the 2011 UCI Track Cycling World Championships, effectively removing her from contention for a place in Team GB's Olympic squad. She placed fourth in the British Time Trial Championships in September that year, but one month later, Romero announced that she was withdrawing from British Cycling's Olympic Programme and would not be competing at the 2012 Summer Olympics.

Romero confirmed that she would compete in the Ironman 70.3 triathlon in Mallorca, the 2012 Ironman UK event in Bolton, and the 2012 Ironman World Championship in Hawaii. She described her participation in these events as a personal challenge and that it would be a "part-time project". In January 2013, she launched Romero Performance, a business offering sports performance consultancy. Three months later, she fronted London Cycle Sportive, a cycling event in aid of the charity Access Sports.

== Honours ==
Romero was a nominee for the 2008 BBC Sports Personality of the Year Award. She was appointed Member of the Order of the British Empire (MBE) in the 2009 New Year Honours. In 2023, she was inducted into the British Cycling Hall of Fame.

== Achievements ==
=== Rowing ===
Olympic Games
2004 – 2nd Quadruple sculls (with Frances Houghton, Debbie Flood, Alison Mowbray)
World Championships
2001 – 5th, Quadruple sculls
2002 – 5th, Quadruple sculls
2003 – 4th, Double sculls
2005 – 1st Quadruple sculls (with Katherine Grainger, Frances Houghton, Sarah Winckless)
U23 World Championships
1999 – 4th, Single sculls
2000 – 1st, Coxless pairs

=== Cycling ===
2006 British National Time Trial Championships

1st Time trial

2006 British National Track Championships

2nd Individual pursuit

2006–07 UCI Track Cycling World Cup Classics

2nd Individual pursuit, Moscow
2nd Individual pursuit, Manchester

2007 UCI Track Cycling World Championships

2nd Individual pursuit

2007 British National Track Championships

1st Individual pursuit

2007–08 UCI Track Cycling World Cup Classics

1st Individual pursuit, Copenhagen
2nd Individual pursuit, Beijing

2008 UCI Track Cycling World Championships

1st Individual pursuit
1st Team pursuit

2008 Summer Olympics

1st Individual pursuit

2010 British National Track Championships

2nd Team pursuit

2011 British National Time Trial Championships

4th Time trial

== See also ==
- Leander Club (member)
- List of athletes who competed in multiple sports at the Summer Olympic games
- List of multi-sport athletes
- List of multi-sport champions
- List of multiple Olympic medalists
