= 2008 UCI Track Cycling World Championships – Women's individual pursuit =

Rainbow jersey

The Women's Individual Pursuit was one of the eight women's events at the 2008 UCI Track Cycling World Championships, held in Manchester, United Kingdom.

20 cyclists from 16 countries participated in the contest. After the qualification, the fastest 2 riders advanced to the Final and the 3rd and 4th best riders raced for the bronze medal.

The qualification took place on 27 March and the Finals later the same day.

== World record ==
World Record
WR	3:24.537	Sarah Ulmer (NZL)	Athens (Greece)	22 August 2004

== Qualifying ==
Rank	Name	1000m	2000m	Time	Speed (km/h)	Q
Rank	Name	1000m	1000–2000	2000–3000	Speed (km/h)	Q
1	Rebecca Romero (GBR)	1:11.437 (3)	2:20.219 (2)	3:29.593	51.528	QF
1	Rebecca Romero (GBR)		1:08.782 (3)	1:09.374 (1)		
2	Sarah Hammer (USA)	1:11.666 (4)	2:20.180 (1)	3:31.041	51.174	QF
2	Sarah Hammer (USA)		1:08.514 (1)	1:10.861		
3	Wendy Houvenaghel (GBR)	1:11.836 (5)	2:21.333 (4)	3:31.753	51.002	QB
3	Wendy Houvenaghel (GBR)		1:09.497 (5)	1:10.420 (3)		
4	Katie Mactier (AUS)	1:10.913 (2)	2:20.300 (3)	3:32.043	50.933	QB
4	Katie Mactier (AUS)		1:10.012 (3)	1:12.003 (3)		
5	Ellen van Dijk (NED)	1:13.959 (11)	2:22.618 (7)	3:32.505	50.822	
5	Ellen van Dijk (NED)		1:08.659 (2)	1:09.887 (2)		
6	Lesya Kalytovska (UKR)	1:12.858 (7)	2:22.590 (6)	3:33.926	49.456	
6	Lesya Kalytovska (UKR)		1:09.732 (7)	1:11.336 (7)		
7	Alison Shanks (NZL)	1:14.194 (13)	2:24.230 (11)	3:35.212	50.183	
7	Alison Shanks (NZL)		1:10.036 (9)	1:10.982 (6)		
8	María Luisa Calle (COL)	1:14.911 (18)	2:24.635 (18)	3:35.505	50.114	
8	María Luisa Calle (COL)		1:09.724 (6)	1:10.870 (5)		
9	Karin Thürig (SUI)	1:14.097 (12)	2:23.840 (9)	3:36.229	49.947	
9	Karin Thürig (SUI)		1:09.743 (8)	1:12.389 (9)		
10	Verena Joos (GER)	1:13.563 (9)	2:23.903 (10)	3:36.357	49.917	
10	Verena Joos (GER)		1:10.340 (10)	1:12.454 (10)		
11	Vilija Sereikaitė (LTU)	1:10.446 (1)	2:21.402 (5)	3:36.375	49.913	
11	Vilija Sereikaitė (LTU)		1:10.956 (11)	1:14.973 (16)		
12	Lada Kozlíková (CZE)	1:12.302 (6)	2:23.668 (8)	3:37.932	49.556	
12	Lada Kozlíková (CZE)		1:11.366 (12)	1:14.264 (13)		
13	Elena Chalykh (RUS)	1:13.105 (8)	2:25.043 (13)	3:39.084	49.296	
13	Elena Chalykh (RUS)		1:11.938 (14)	1:14.041 (12)		
14	Yelyzaveta Bochkaryova (UKR)	1:13.919 (10)	2:226.094 (14)	3:40.415	48.998	
14	Yelyzaveta Bochkaryova (UKR)		1:12.175 (15)	1:14.321 (14)		
15	Leire Olaberria (ESP)	1:15.381 (19)	2:26.979 (15)	3:41.557	48.745	
15	Leire Olaberria (ESP)		1:11.598 (13)	1:14.578 (15)		
16	Tara Whitten (CAN)	1:14.547 (16)	2:27.047 (16)	3:42.931	48.445	
16	Tara Whitten (CAN)		1:12.500 (16)	1:15.884 (17)		
17	Tatiana Guderzo (ITA)	1:16.062 (20)	2:30.225 (20)	3:44.239	48.162	
17	Tatiana Guderzo (ITA)		1:14.163 (19)	1:14.014 (11)		
18	Lee Min Hye (KOR)	1:14.818 (17)	2:28.242 (18)	3:44.930	48.014	
18	Lee Min Hye (KOR)		1:13.424 (17)	1:16.688 (18)		
19	Olga Slyusareva (RUS)	1:14.195 (14)	2:27.868 (17)	3:45.304	47.935	
19	Olga Slyusareva (RUS)		1:13.673 (18)	1:17.436 (19)		
20	Svetlana Paulikaite (LTU)	1:14.366 (15)	2:29.925 (19)	3:48.255	47.315	
20	Svetlana Paulikaite (LTU)		1:15.559 (20)	1:18.330 (20)		

== Finals ==
Rank	Name	1000m	2000m	Time	Speed (km/h)
Rank	Name	1000m	1000–2000	2000–3000	Speed (km/h)
Gold Medal Race
	Rebecca Romero (GBR)	1:12.219 (1)	2:21.309 (1)	3:30.501	51.606
	Rebecca Romero (GBR)		1:09.090 (1)	1:09.192 (1)	
	Sarah Hammer (USA)	1:13.610 (2)	2:24.898 (2)	3:37.006	49.768
	Sarah Hammer (USA)		1:11.288 (2)	1:12.108 (2)	
Bronze Medal Race
	Katie Mactier (AUS)	1:11.482 (1)	2:20.992 (1)	3:32.347	50.860
	Katie Mactier (AUS)		1:09.510 (1)	1:11.335 (1)	
	Wendy Houvenaghel (GBR)	1:13.419 (2)	2:23.501 (2)	3:34.168	50.472
	Wendy Houvenaghel (GBR)		1:10.082 (2)	1:10.667 (2)	
