= Osiecko, Opole Voivodeship =

Osiecko
- Village
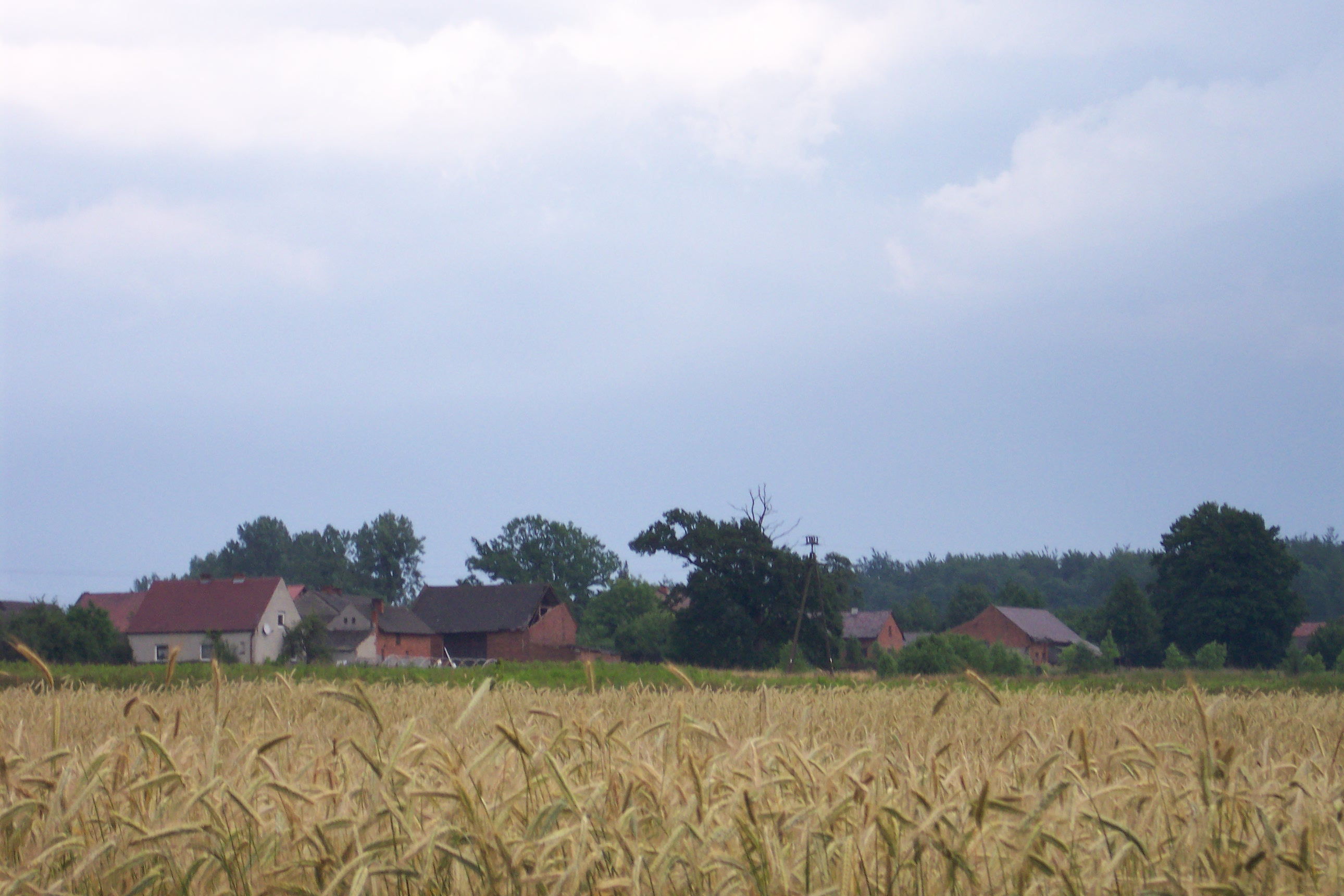

- Location within Poland
- Coordinates: 50°47′N 18°23′E
- Country: Poland
- Voivodeship: Opole
- County: Olesno
- Gmina: Zębowice

Osiecko [ɔˈɕɛt͡skɔ] is a village in the administrative district of Gmina Zębowice, within Olesno County, Opole Voivodeship, in south-western Poland.
