= Siedliska, Olesno County =

Siedliska
- Village
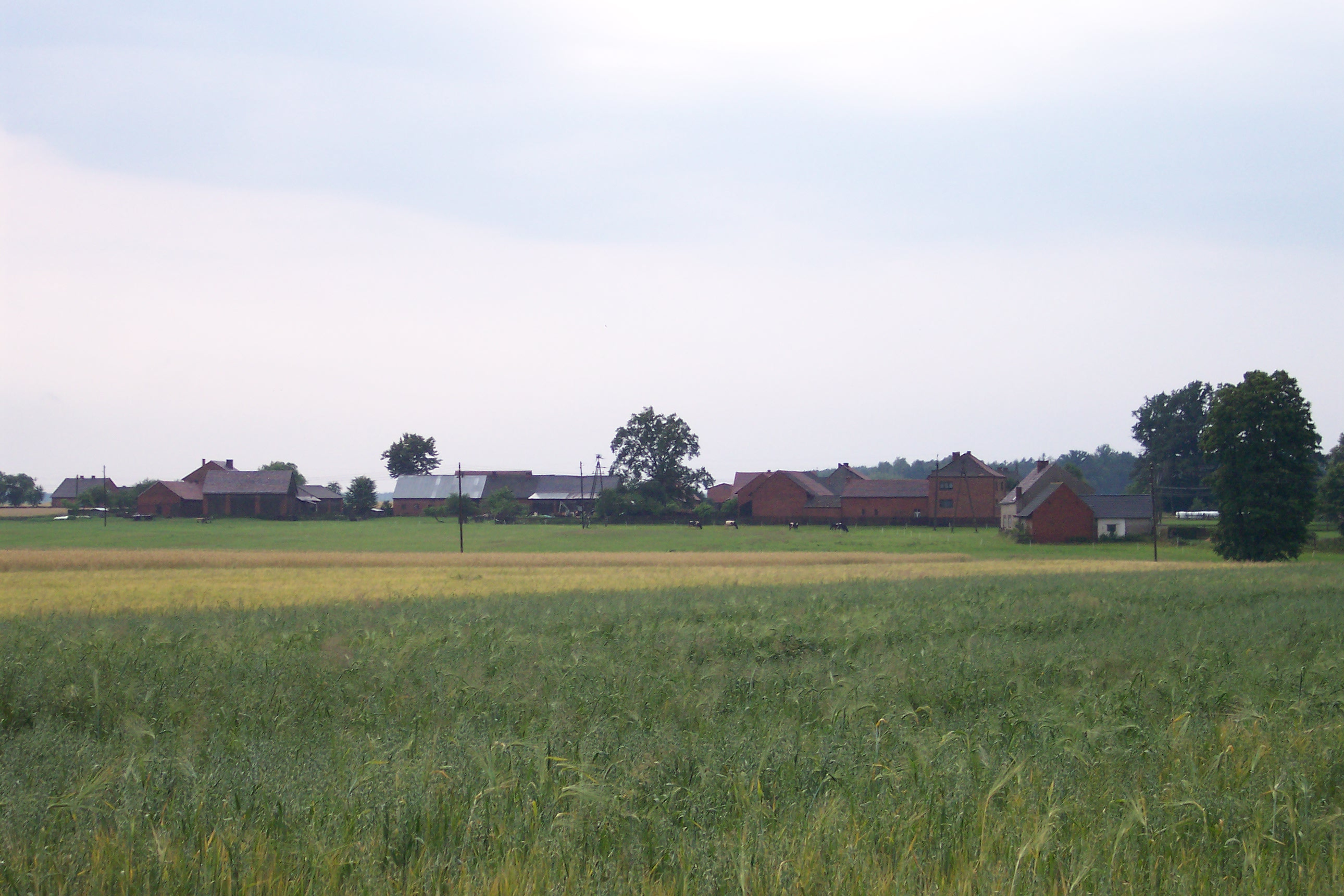

- Location within Poland
- Coordinates: 50°47′06″N 18°21′24″E
- Country: Poland
- Voivodeship: Opole
- County: Olesno
- Gmina: Zębowice

Siedliska [ɕɛdˈlʲiska] is a village in the administrative district of Gmina Zębowice, within Olesno County, Opole Voivodeship, in south-western Poland.
