= Gmina Zębowice =

Gmina Zębowice Gemeinde Zembowitz Zębowice Commune
- Gmina
- Coat of arms
- Interactive map of Gmina Zębowice
- Coordinates (Zębowice): 50°45′43″N 18°20′50″E
- Country: Poland
- Voivodeship: Opole
- County: Olesno
- Seat: Zębowice

Area
  - Total: 95.81 km^{2} (36.99 sq mi)

Population (2019-06-30)
  - Total: 3,652
  - Density: 38.12/km^{2} (98.72/sq mi)
- Time zone: UTC+1 (CET)
  - Summer (DST): UTC+2 (CEST)
- Vehicle registration: OOL
- Website: http://www.zebowice.pl

Gmina Zębowice (German: Gemeinde Zembowitz) is a rural gmina (administrative district) in Olesno County, Opole Voivodeship, in southern Poland. Its seat is the village of Zębowice, which lies approximately 14 kilometres (9 mi) south of Olesno and 32 km (20 mi) east of the regional capital Opole.

The gmina covers an area of 95.81 square kilometres (37.0 sq mi), and as of 2019 its total population is 3,652. Since 2007 the commune has been officially bilingual in Polish and German due to a sizeable German minority, as many ethnic Germans have remained after World War II.

== Villages ==
The commune contains the villages and settlements of:

- Zębowice
- Borowiany
- Kadłub Wolny
- Knieja
- Kosice
- Łąka
- Nowa Wieś
- Osiecko
- Poczołków
- Prusków
- Radawie
- Radawka
- Siedliska

== Neighbouring gminas ==
Gmina Zębowice is bordered by the gminas of Dobrodzień, Lasowice Wielkie, Olesno, Ozimek and Turawa.
