= Cycling at the 2010 Commonwealth Games – Women's individual pursuit =

The Women's individual pursuit took place at 8 October 2010 at the Indira Gandhi Arena.

== Qualifying ==
Rank	Rider	Time	Average Speed (km/h)
1	Alison Shanks (NZL)	3:32.114	50.916
2	Wendy Houvenaghel (NIR)	3:34.560	50.335
3	Tara Whitten (CAN)	3:36.548	49.873
4	Jaime Nielsen (NZL)	3:37.607	49.630
5	Josephine Tomic (AUS)	3:37.961	49.550
6	Sarah Storey (ENG)	3:39.964	49.098
7	Laura Trott (ENG)	3:40.329	49.017
8	Lauren Ellis (NZL)	3:41.592	48.738
9	Ashlee Ankudinoff (AUS)	3:45.656	47.860
10	Anna Blyth (ENG)	3:51.252	46.702
11	Mahitha Mohan (IND)	4:08.441	43.471
12	Sayona Po (IND)	4:19.630	41.597
13	Sunita Devi (IND)	DSQ	

== Finals ==
Final

Rank	Name	Time
1st place, gold medalist(s)	Alison Shanks (NZL)	3:30.875
2nd place, silver medalist(s)	Wendy Houvenaghel (NIR)	3:32.137

Bronze medal match

Rank	Name	Time
3rd place, bronze medalist(s)	Tara Whitten (CAN)	3:35.810
4	Jaime Nielsen (NZL)	3:39.923
