= Łąka, Olesno County =

Łąka
- Village
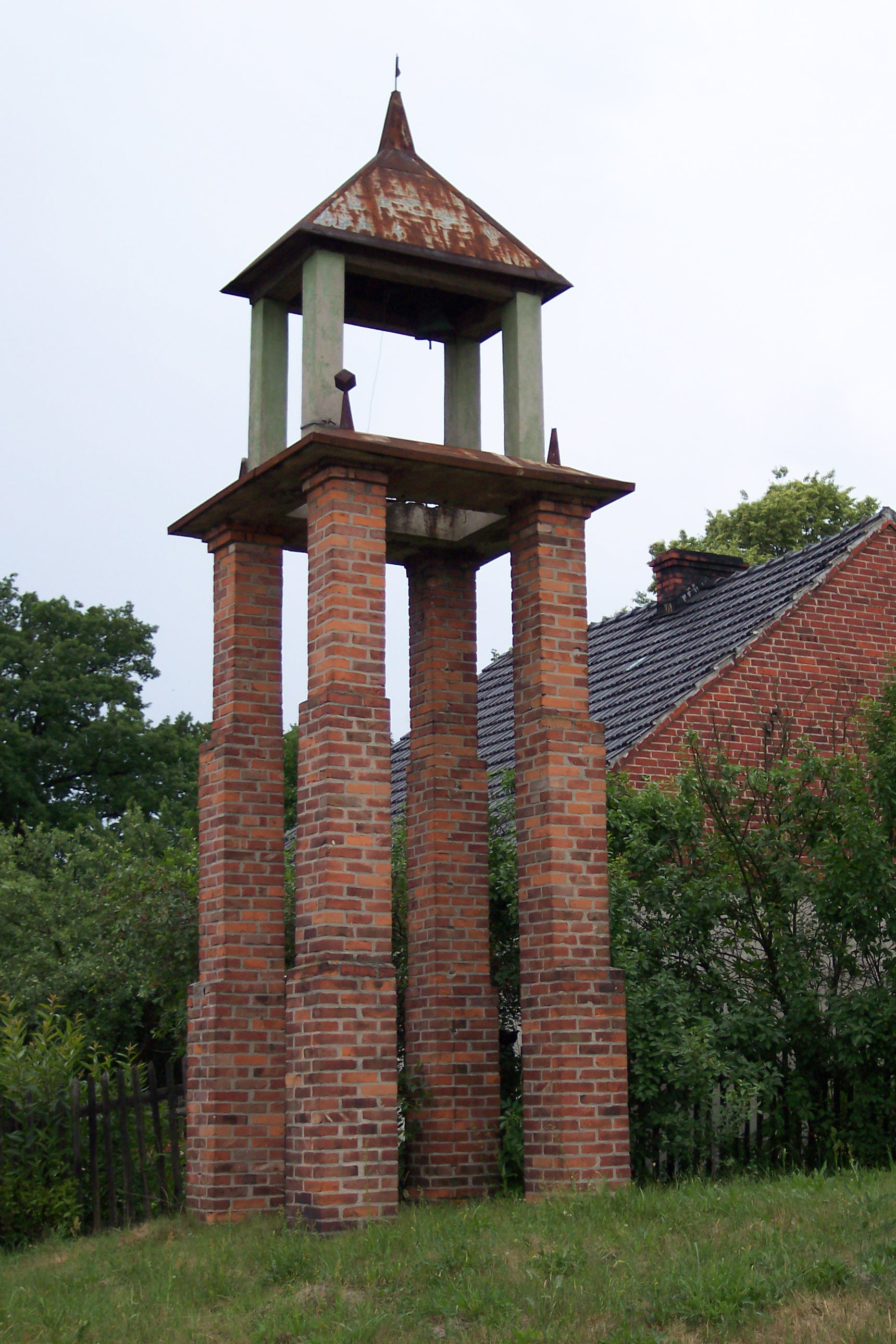
- Tower in Łąka

- Location within Poland
- Coordinates: 50°46′00″N 18°17′17″E
- Country: Poland
- Voivodeship: Opole
- County: Olesno
- Gmina: Zębowice

Łąka [ˈwɔnka] (German Lenke) is a village in the administrative district of Gmina Zębowice, within Olesno County, Opole Voivodeship, in south-western Poland.
