= Poczołków =

- Village
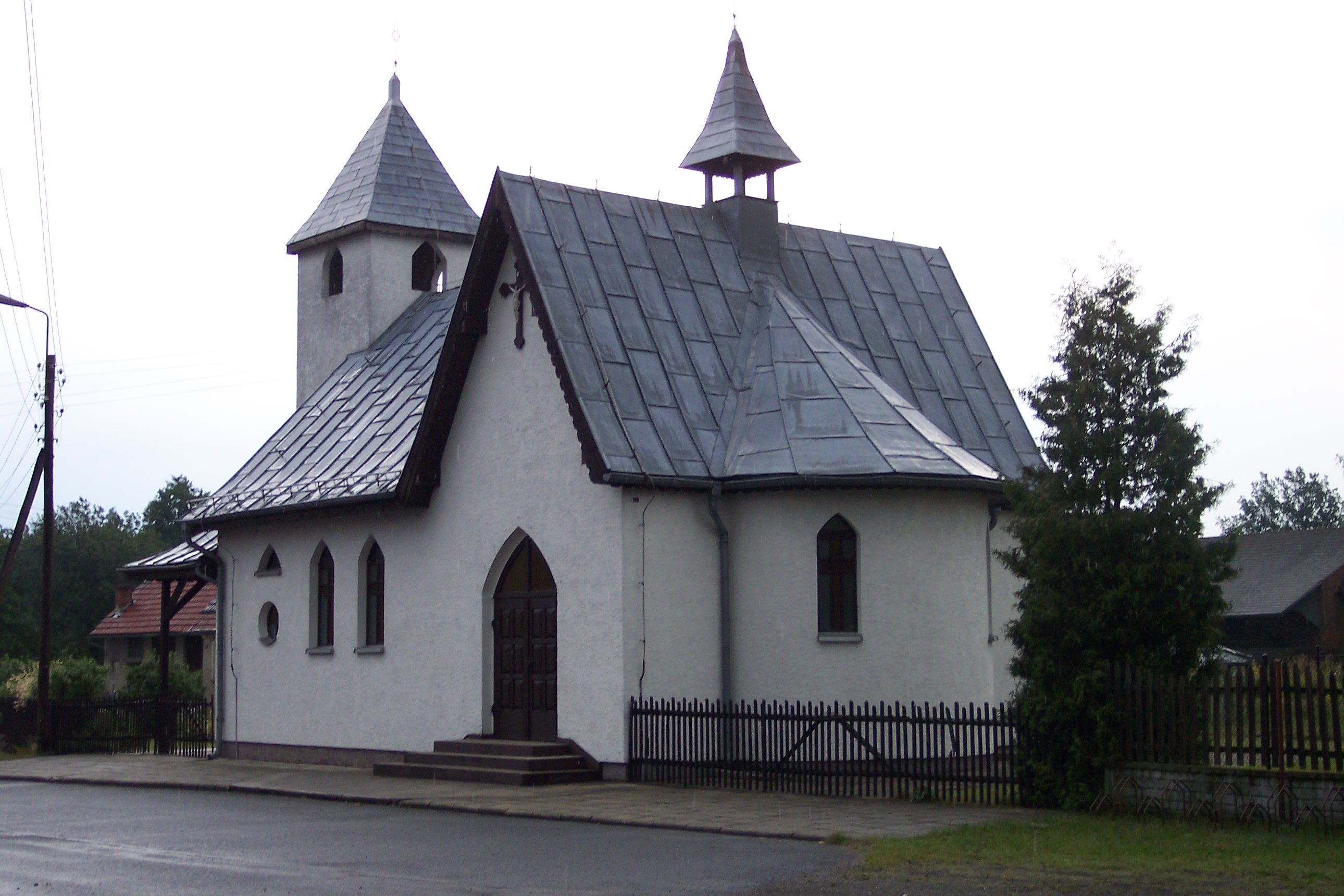

- Location within Poland
- Coordinates: 50°46′17″N 18°23′37″E
- Country: Poland
- Voivodeship: Opole
- County: Olesno
- Gmina: Zębowice

Poczołków [pɔˈt͡ʂɔu̯kuf] is a village in the administrative district of Gmina Zębowice, within Olesno County, Opole Voivodeship, in south-western Poland.
