= 2009 UCI Track Cycling World Championships – Women's team pursuit =

Rainbow jersey

The Women's Team Pursuit was one of the nine women's events at the 2009 UCI Track Cycling World Championships, held in Pruszków, Poland on 26 March.

42 cyclists from 14 countries participated in the contest. After the qualification, the fastest two teams advanced to the final and the 3rd and 4th fastest raced for the bronze medal.

The qualification took place on 26 March and the finals were held later the same day.

== World record ==
World Record
WR	time?	team?	location?	date?

== Qualifying ==
Rank	Name	Country	1000m	2000m	Time	Speed (km/h)	Q
Rank	Name	Country	1000m	1000–2000	2000–3000	Speed (km/h)	Q
1	Elizabeth Armitstead; Wendy Houvenaghel; Joanna Rowsell	Great Britain	1:11.241 (1)	2:17.638 (1)	3:25.147	52.645	QF
1	Elizabeth Armitstead; Wendy Houvenaghel; Joanna Rowsell	Great Britain		1:06.397 (1)	1:07.509 (2)		
2	Lauren Ellis; Jaime Nielsen; Alison Shanks	New Zealand	1:12.368 (6)	2:18.923 (3)	3:26.023	52.421	QF
2	Lauren Ellis; Jaime Nielsen; Alison Shanks	New Zealand		1:06.555 (2)	1:07.100 (1)		
3	Ashlee Ankudinoff; Sarah Kent; Josephine Tomic	Australia	1:11.307 (2)	2:18.772 (2)	3:27.719	51.993	QB
3	Ashlee Ankudinoff; Sarah Kent; Josephine Tomic	Australia		1:07.465 (3)	1:08.947 (3)		
4	Vera Koedooder; Amy Pieters; Ellen van Dijk	Netherlands	1:12.925 (7)	2:21.571 (7)	3:30.893	51.210	QB
4	Vera Koedooder; Amy Pieters; Ellen van Dijk	Netherlands		1:08.646 (5)	1:09.322 (5)		
5	Svetlana Pauliukaitė; Vilija Sereikaitė; Aušrinė Trebaitė	Lithuania	1:11.860 (4)	2:21.449 (6)	3:30.966	51.193	
5	Svetlana Pauliukaitė; Vilija Sereikaitė; Aušrinė Trebaitė	Lithuania		1:09.589 (10)	1:09.517 (6)		
6	Chen Yue; Sun Feiyan; Wang Cui	China	1:14.394 (13)	2:22.603 (8)	3:31.753	51.002	
6	Chen Yue; Sun Feiyan; Wang Cui	China		1:08.209 (4)	1:09.150 (4)		
7	Charlotte Becker; Christina Becker; Verena Joos	Germany	1:11.329 (3)	2:20.234 (4)	3:31.770	50.998	
7	Charlotte Becker; Christina Becker; Verena Joos	Germany		1:08.905 (6)	1:11.536 (11)		
8	Elena Tchalykh; Victoria Kondel; Olga Slyusareva	Russia	1:11.996 (5)	2:21.219 (5)	3:32.272	50.878	
8	Elena Tchalykh; Victoria Kondel; Olga Slyusareva	Russia		1:09.223 (7)	1:11.053 (8)		
9	Jessie Daams; Jolien D'Hoore; Kelly Druyts	Belgium	1:13.477 (10)	2:22.738 (9)	3:33.010	50.701	
9	Jessie Daams; Jolien D'Hoore; Kelly Druyts	Belgium		1:09.261 (8)	1:10.272 (7)		
10	Andrea Botero Coy; María Luisa Calle; Lorena Vargas	Colombia	1:13.481 (11)	2:23.103 (11)	3:34.460	50.359	
10	Andrea Botero Coy; María Luisa Calle; Lorena Vargas	Colombia		1:09.622 (11)	1:11.357 (10)		
11	Alena Amialiusik; Aksana Papko; Tatsiana Sharakova	Belarus	1:13.387 (9)	2:22.868 (10)	3:34.536	50.341	
11	Alena Amialiusik; Aksana Papko; Tatsiana Sharakova	Belarus		1:09.481 (9)	1:11.668 (12)		
12	Alessandra Borchi; Tatiana Guderzo; Marta Tagliaferro	Italy	1:14.121 (12)	2:24.318 (12)	3:35.661	50.078	
12	Alessandra Borchi; Tatiana Guderzo; Marta Tagliaferro	Italy		1:10.197 (12)	1:11.343 (9)		
13	Edyta Jasińska; Dominika Mączka; Małgorzata Wojtyra	Poland	1:13.346 (8)	2:25.455 (13)	3:38.319	49.468	
13	Edyta Jasińska; Dominika Mączka; Małgorzata Wojtyra	Poland		1:12.109 (13)	1:12.864 (13)		
14	Helena Casas Roige; Gema Pascual Torrecilla; Ana Usabiaga Bareldi	Spain	1:14.726 (14)	2:28.163 (14)	3:42.953	48.440	
14	Helena Casas Roige; Gema Pascual Torrecilla; Ana Usabiaga Bareldi	Spain		1:13.437 (14)	1:14.790 (14)		

== Finals ==
Rank	Name	Country	1000m	2000m	Time	Speed (km/h)	Note
Rank	Name	Country	1000m	1000–2000	2000–3000	Speed (km/h)	Note
Gold Medal Race
	Elizabeth Armitstead; Wendy Houvenaghel; Joanna Rowsell	Great Britain	1:10.272 (1)	2:16.304 (1)	3:22.720	53.275	
	Elizabeth Armitstead; Wendy Houvenaghel; Joanna Rowsell	Great Britain		1:06.032 (2)	1:06.416 (1)		
	Lauren Ellis; Jaime Nielsen; Alison Shanks	New Zealand	1:10.686 (2)	2:16.442 (2)	3:23.993	52.942	
	Lauren Ellis; Jaime Nielsen; Alison Shanks	New Zealand		1:05.756 (1)	1:07.551 (2)		
Bronze Medal Race
	Ashlee Ankudinoff; Sarah Kent; Josephine Tomic	Australia	1:10.616 (1)	2:17.547 (1)	3:24.972	52.690	
	Ashlee Ankudinoff; Sarah Kent; Josephine Tomic	Australia		1:06.931 (1)	1:07.425 (1)		
4	Vera Koedooder; Amy Pieters; Ellen van Dijk	Netherlands	1:12.079 (2)	2:19.939 (2)	3:29.379	51.581	NR
4	Vera Koedooder; Amy Pieters; Ellen van Dijk	Netherlands		1:07.860 (2)	1:09.440 (2)		
