= Knieja, Opole Voivodeship =

Knieja
- Village
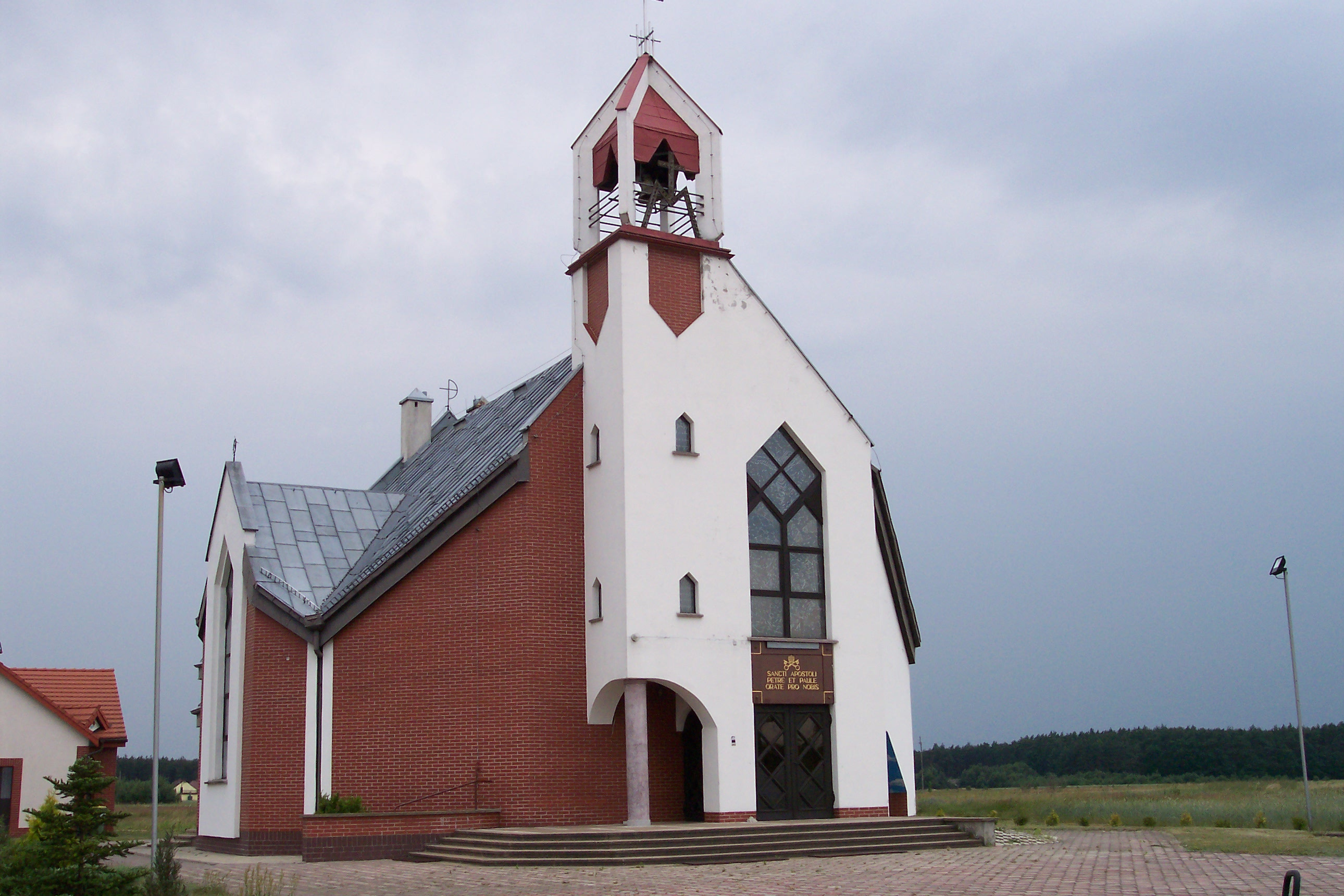
- Catholic church

- Location within Poland
- Coordinates: 50°45′N 18°17′E
- Country: Poland
- Voivodeship: Opole
- County: Olesno
- Gmina: Zębowice

Knieja [ˈkɲɛja] (German: Kneja) is a village in the administrative district of Gmina Zębowice, within Olesno County, Opole Voivodeship, in south-western Poland.
