= 2011–12 UCI Track Cycling World Cup – Round 4 – Women's individual pursuit =

Round 4 Women's individual pursuit
2011–12 UCI Track Cycling World Cup, race 2/2

Race details
- Dates: 18 February 2012
- Stages: 1
- Distance: 3 km (1.864 mi)
- Winning time: 3:32.364

Medalists
	Gold	Joanna Rowsell (GBR)
	Silver	Alison Shanks (NZL)
	Bronze	Amy Cure (AUS)

The second round of the women's individual pursuit during the fourth round of the 2011–12 UCI Track Cycling World Cup took place in London, United Kingdom on 18 February 2012 and was part of the London Prepares series. 22 Athletes participated in the contest.

== Competition format ==
The women's individual pursuit consists of a 3 km time trial race between two riders, starting on opposite sides of the track. If one rider catches the other, the race is over.

The tournament consisted of an initial qualifying round. The top two riders in the qualifying round advanced to the gold medal match and the third and fourth riders advanced to the bronze medal race.

== Schedule ==
Saturday 18 February
09:00-10:06 Qualifying
20:00-20:15 Finals
20:19-20:26 Victory Ceremony

Schedule from Tissottiming.com

== Results ==
=== Qualifying ===
Rank	Cyclist	Country	Result	Notes
1	Joanna Rowsell	United Kingdom	3:33.496	Q
2	Alison Shanks	New Zealand	3:33.578	Q
3	Vilija Sereikaitė	Lithuania	3:35.739	q
4	Amy Cure	Australia	3:35.783	q
5	Jasmin Glaesser	Canada	3:36.593	
6	Ellen van Dijk	Netherlands	3:38.989	
7	Venera Absalyamova	Russia; RusVelo	3:40.353	
8	Pascale Schinder	Switzerland	3:41.414	
9	Yelyzaveta Bochkaryova	Ukraine	3:42.076	
10	Caroline Ryan	Ireland	3:42.106	
11	Madeleine Sandig	Germany	3:42.272	
12	Jennie Reed	United States	3:43.348	
13	Eugenia Bujak	Poland	3:43.766	
14	Els Belmans	Belgium	3:44.023	
15	Anastasia Chulkova	Russia	3:45.486	
16	Alena Dylko	Belarus	3:45.604	
17	Gloria Rodríguez Sánchez	Spain	3:47.446	
18	Yumari González Valdivieso	Cuba	3:51.268	
19	Pia Pensaari	Finland	3:54.779	
20	Olatz Ferran Zubillaga	Spain; Fullgas Orggipuzkoa	3:59.024	
21	Laura Basso	Italy; Cycling Team Friuli	4:01.633	
	Ju I Fang	Chinese Taipei	DSQ	

Results from Tissottiming.com.

=== Finals ===
==== Final bronze medal race ====
Rank	Cyclist	Country	Result	Notes
3rd place, bronze medalist(s)	Amy Cure	Australia	3:36.707	
4	Vilija Sereikaitė	Lithuania	3:37.137	

==== Final gold medal race ====
Rank	Cyclist	Country	Result	Notes
1st place, gold medalist(s)	Joanna Rowsell	United Kingdom	3:32.364	
2nd place, silver medalist(s)	Alison Shanks	New Zealand	3:33.406	

Results from Tissottiming.com.
