= Alessandra Borchi =

Italian cyclist

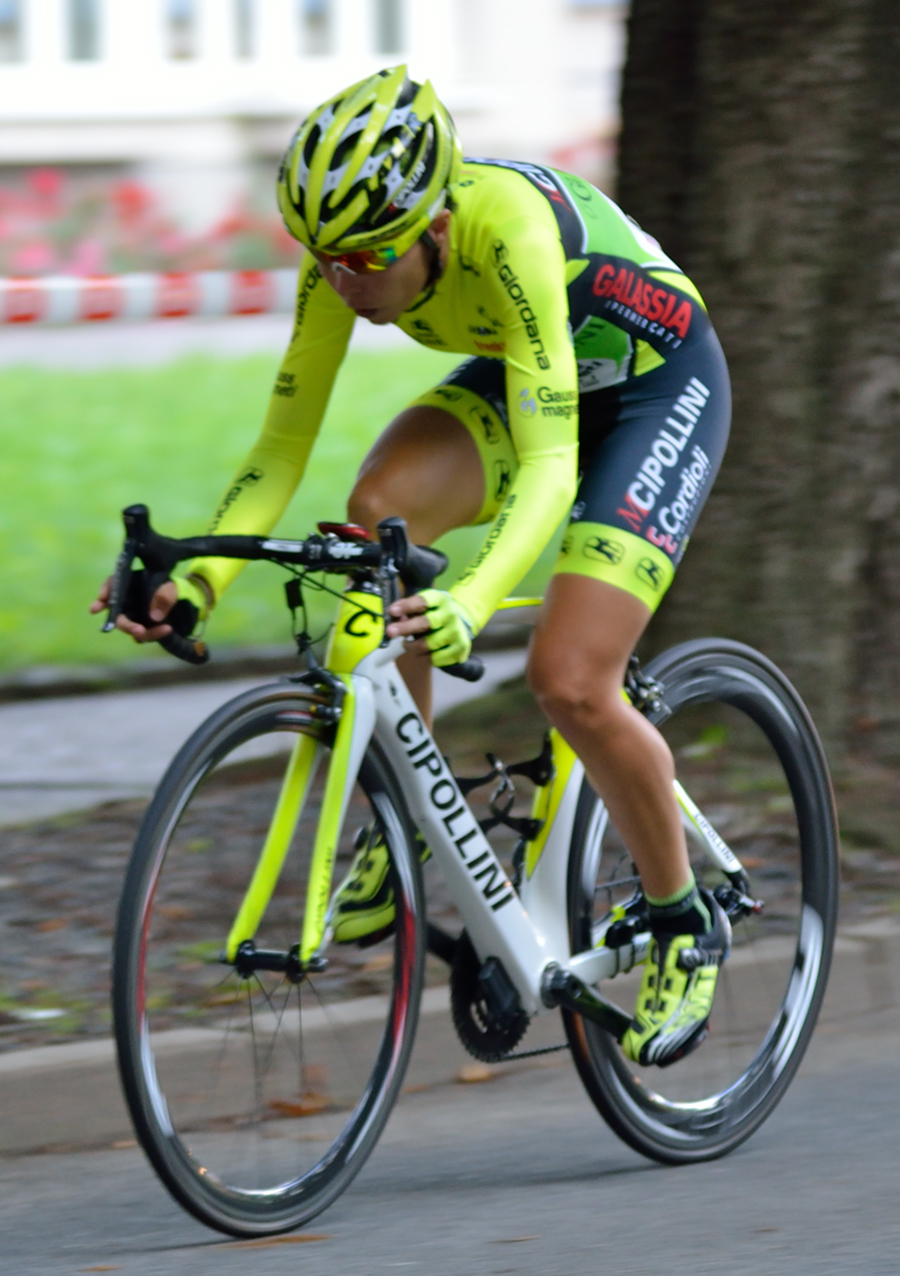

Personal information
- Born: 15 August 1983 (age 43)

Cycling career
- Sport: Cycling
- Discipline: Track cycling
- Role: Rider
- Rider type: endurance

Professional teams
- 2006: Nobili Rubinetterie Menikini Cogeas
- 2008: Cycling Team Titanedi-Frezza Acca Due O

Alessandra Borchi (born 15 August 1983) is an Italian female track cyclist, and part of the national team. She competed in the team pursuit event at the 2009 UCI Track Cycling World Championships.
