= 2010 UCI Track Cycling World Championships – Women's individual pursuit =

Rainbow jersey

The Women's individual pursuit was one of the nine women's events at the 2010 UCI Track Cycling World Championships, held in Ballerup, Denmark on 24 March 2010.

22 cyclists from 17 countries participated in the contest. After the qualification, the fastest 2 riders advanced to the Final and the 3rd and 4th best riders raced for the bronze medal.

The qualification took place on 24 March and the Finals later the same day.

== World record ==
World record
WR	3:24.537	Sarah Ulmer (NZL)	Athens (Greece)	22 August 2004

== Qualifying ==
Rank	Name	Nation	Time	Notes
1	Sarah Hammer	United States	3:27.826	Q
2	Wendy Houvenaghel	Great Britain	3:30.377	Q
3	Alison Shanks	New Zealand	3:31.259	Q
4	Vilija Sereikaitė	Lithuania	3:31.905	Q
5	Ellen van Dijk	Netherlands	3:33.704	
6	Lesya Kalytovska	Ukraine	3:36.159	
7	Jaime Nielsen	New Zealand	3:37.212	
8	Vera Koedooder	Netherlands	3:37.466	
9	Tara Whitten	Canada	3:38.315	
10	Jiang Fan	China	3:38.519	
11	Pascale Schnider	Switzerland	3:39.111	
12	Na Ah Reum	South Korea	3:39.518	
13	Sarah Kent	Australia	3:40.779	
14	Verena Joos	Germany	3:41.092	
15	Dalila Rodríguez Hernandez	Cuba	3:41.277	
16	Charlotte Becker	Germany	3:42.068	
17	Elissavet Chantzi	Greece	3:44.802	
18	Aušrinė Trebaitė	Lithuania	3:45.286	
19	Vaida Pikauskaitė	Lithuania	3:45.782	
20	Débora Gálvez Lopes	Spain	3:46.051	
21	Chanpeng Nontasin	Thailand	3:54.945	
22	Wong Wan Yiu Jamie	Hong Kong	3:59.093	

== Finals ==
Rank	Name	Nation	Time
Gold Medal Race
1st place, gold medalist(s)	Sarah Hammer	United States	3:28.601
2nd place, silver medalist(s)	Wendy Houvenaghel	Great Britain	3:32.496
Bronze Medal Race
3rd place, bronze medalist(s)	Vilija Sereikaitė	Lithuania	3:32.085
4	Alison Shanks	New Zealand	3:32.733
