= Radawka, Opole Voivodeship =

Radawka
- Village
- Location within Poland
- Coordinates: 50°47′51″N 18°17′56″E
- Country: Poland
- Voivodeship: Opole
- County: Olesno
- Gmina: Zębowice

Radawka [raˈdafka] is a village in the administrative district of Gmina Zębowice, within Olesno County, Opole Voivodeship, in south-western Poland.
