= Sinch Bikes =

New Zealand electric bicycle company

- Type: Private
- Industry: Bicycles
- Founder: Stephen James, Kim Struthers
- Headquarters: New Zealand
- Products: Electric bicycles
- Parent: Delve DMD
- Website: sinchbikes.co.nz

Sinch Bikes is an electric bicycle company based in New Zealand. Sinch Bikes was founded by Stephen James and Kim Struthers – the son of John Struthers, who was the founder of New Zealand's best-known bicycle company Avanti.

== History ==
Stephen James and Kim Struthers, whose father John Struthers founded Avanti Bicycles in the 1980s, launched Sinch Bikes in 2019. Sinch Bikes focuses on e-bikes.

Sinch Bike's parent company is Delve DMD. It currently has 32 locations in New Zealand.

Sinch Bikes has also partnered with Shimano and only uses mid-drive Shimano systems.

== Models ==
The bicycles are designed for diverse users, ranging from serious athletes to casual bikers and children. Sinch Bike models include:

- Jaunt (for comfort and ease of use)
- Mode (for on/off-road riding)
- Rush (for commuting)
- Junior (for the shorter rider)

== See also ==
- List of electric bicycle brands and manufacturers
