= Kosice, Poland =

Kosice
- Village
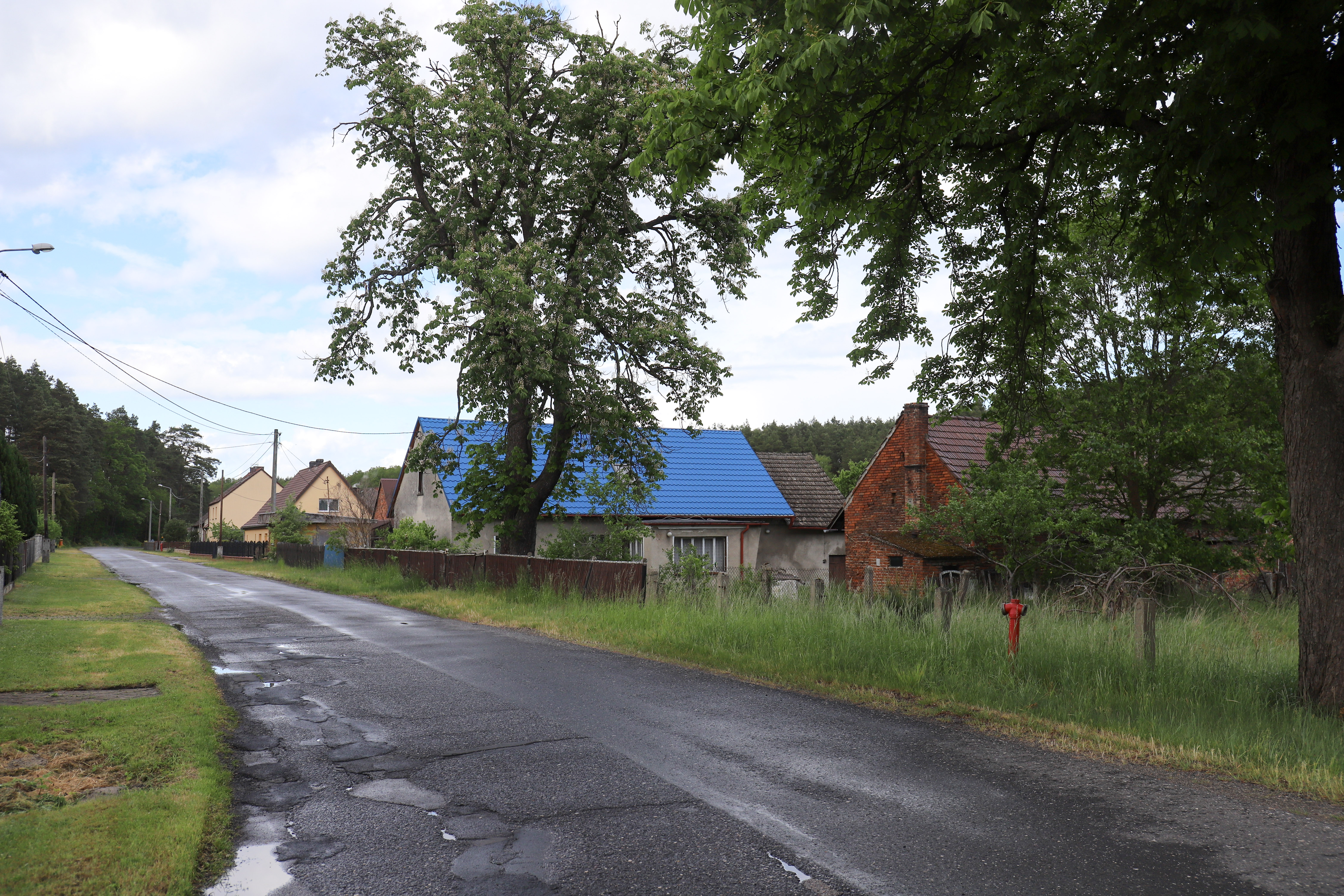

- Location within Poland
- Coordinates: 50°46′21″N 18°15′38″E
- Country: Poland
- Voivodeship: Opole
- County: Olesno
- Gmina: Zębowice
- Population: 140

Kosice [kɔˈɕit͡sɛ] is a village in the administrative district of Gmina Zębowice, within Olesno County, Opole Voivodeship, in south-western Poland.
