= Kadłub Wolny =

- Village
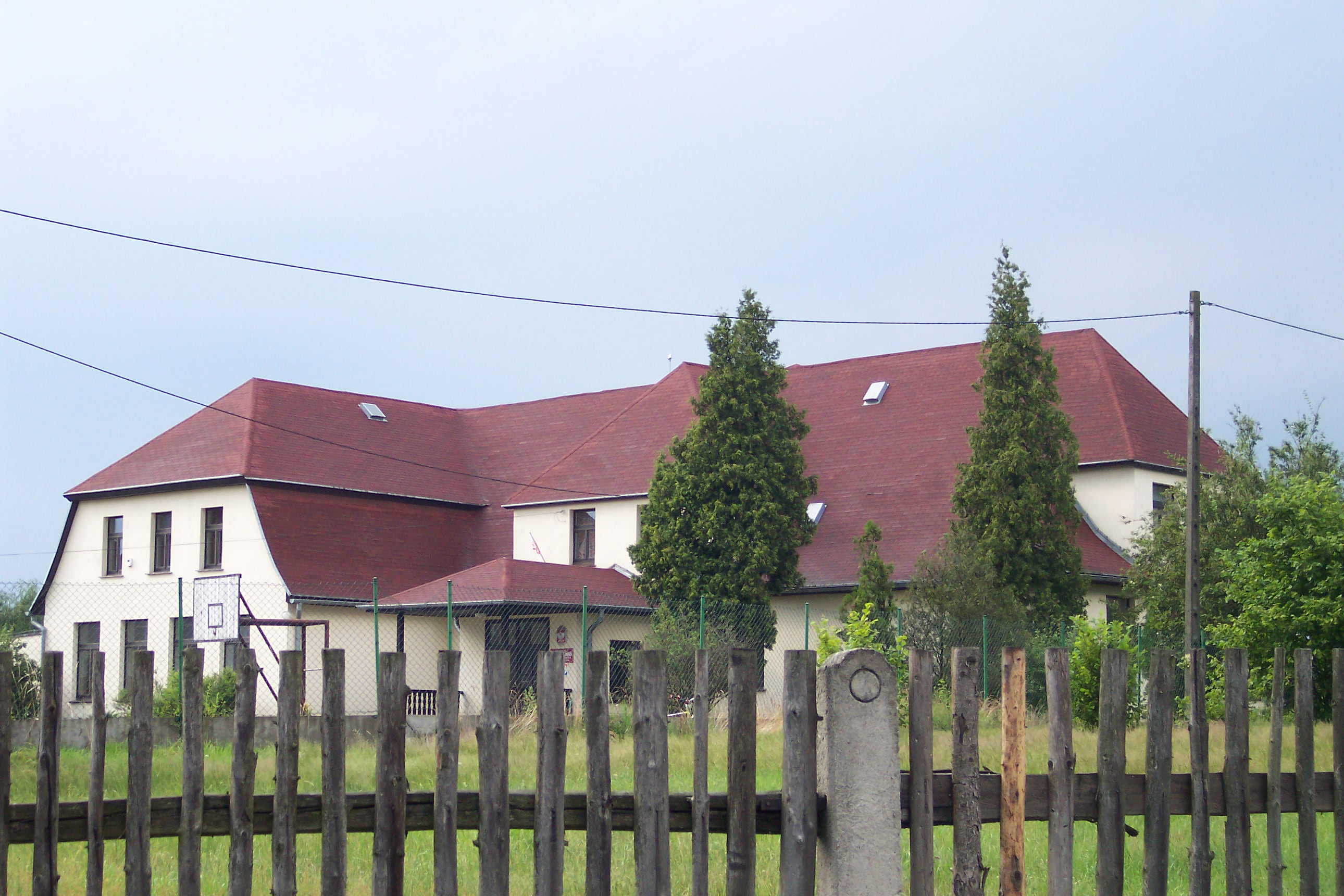
- School

- Location within Poland
- Coordinates: 50°46′N 18°22′E
- Country: Poland
- Voivodeship: Opole
- County: Olesno
- Gmina: Zębowice
- Website: http://www.kadlubwolny.go.pl

Kadłub Wolny [ˈkadwup ˈvɔlnɨ] is a village in the administrative district of Gmina Zębowice, within Olesno County, Opole Voivodeship, in south-western Poland.
