= Nowa Wieś, Olesno County =

Nowa Wieś
- Village
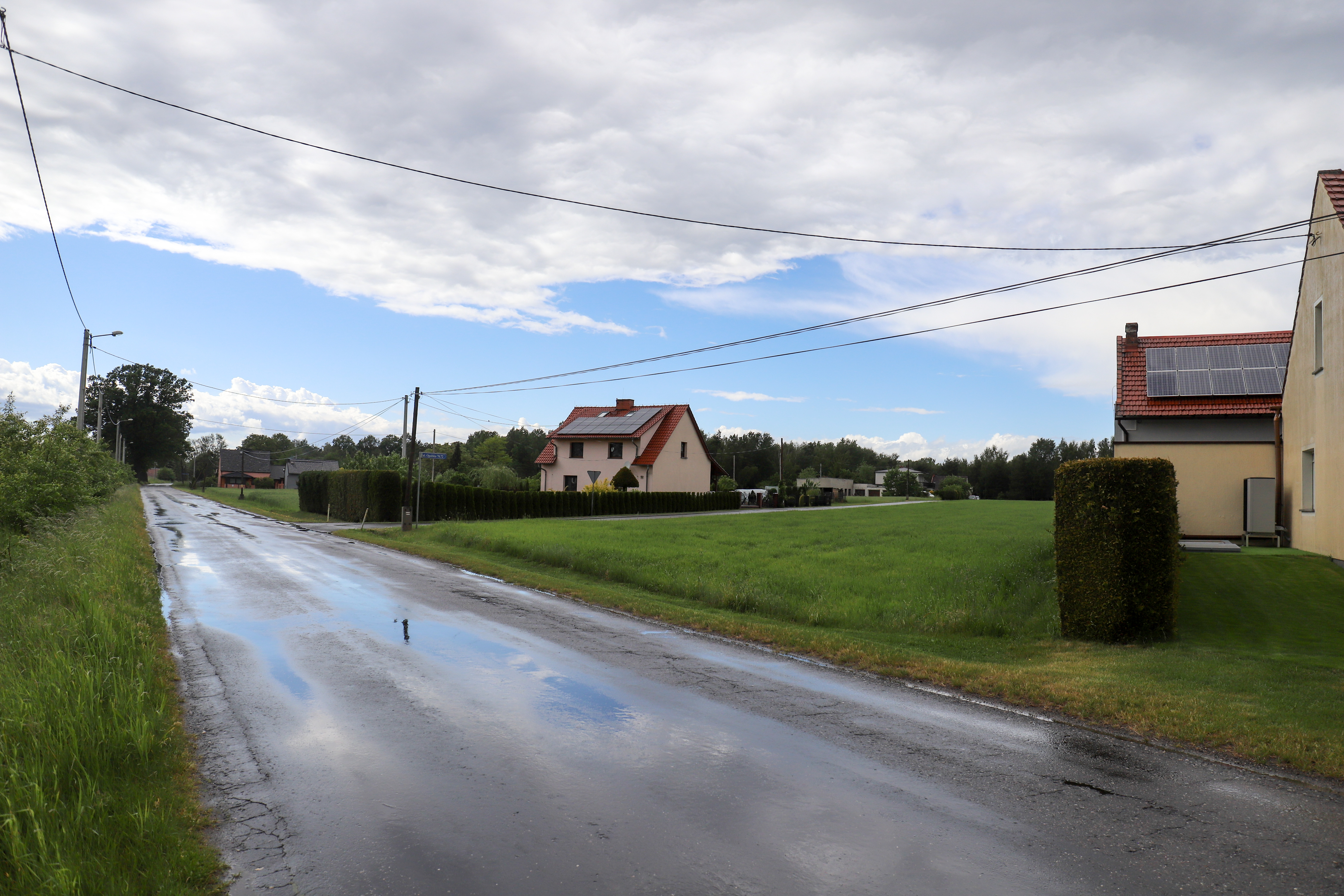

- Location within Poland
- Coordinates: 50°46′16″N 18°19′14″E
- Country: Poland
- Voivodeship: Opole
- County: Olesno
- Gmina: Zębowice

Nowa Wieś [ˈnɔva ˈvjɛɕ] is a village in the administrative district of Gmina Zębowice, within Olesno County, Opole Voivodeship, in south-western Poland.
