= Zębowice, Opole Voivodeship =

Zębowice Zembowitz
- Village
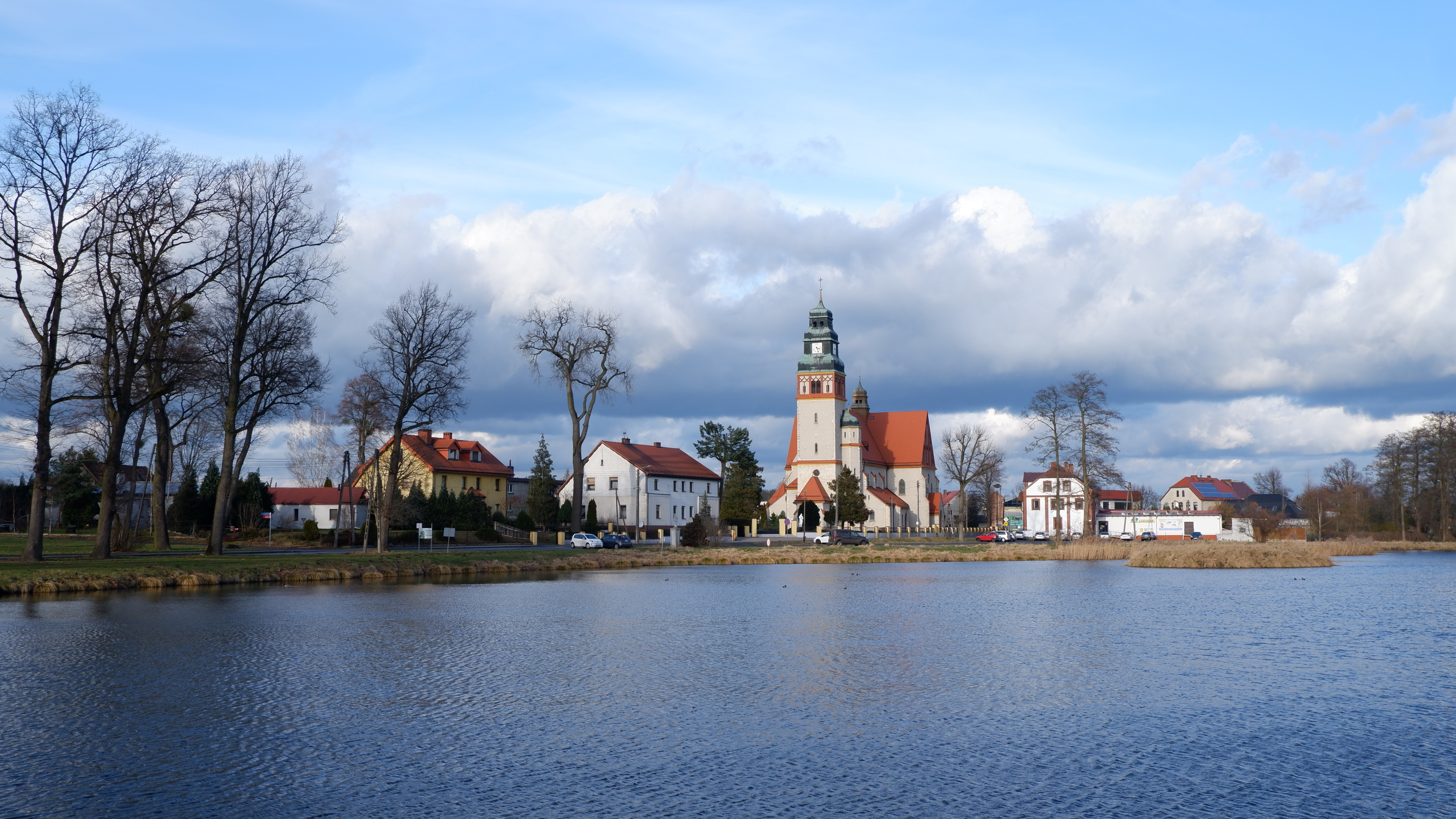

- Location within Poland
- Coordinates: 50°45′43″N 18°20′50″E
- Country: Poland
- Voivodeship: Opole
- County: Olesno
- Gmina: Zębowice
- Population: 1,500
- Website: http://www.zebowice.pl/

Zębowice ([zɛmbɔˈvit͡sɛ]; German: Zembowitz) is a village in Olesno County, Opole Voivodeship, in southern Poland. It is the seat of the gmina (administrative district) called Gmina Zębowice.

The village has a population of 1,500. 44% of the population belong to the German minority. Zębowice has the largest proportion of Germans in Poland.
