= Alison Shanks =

New Zealand cyclist

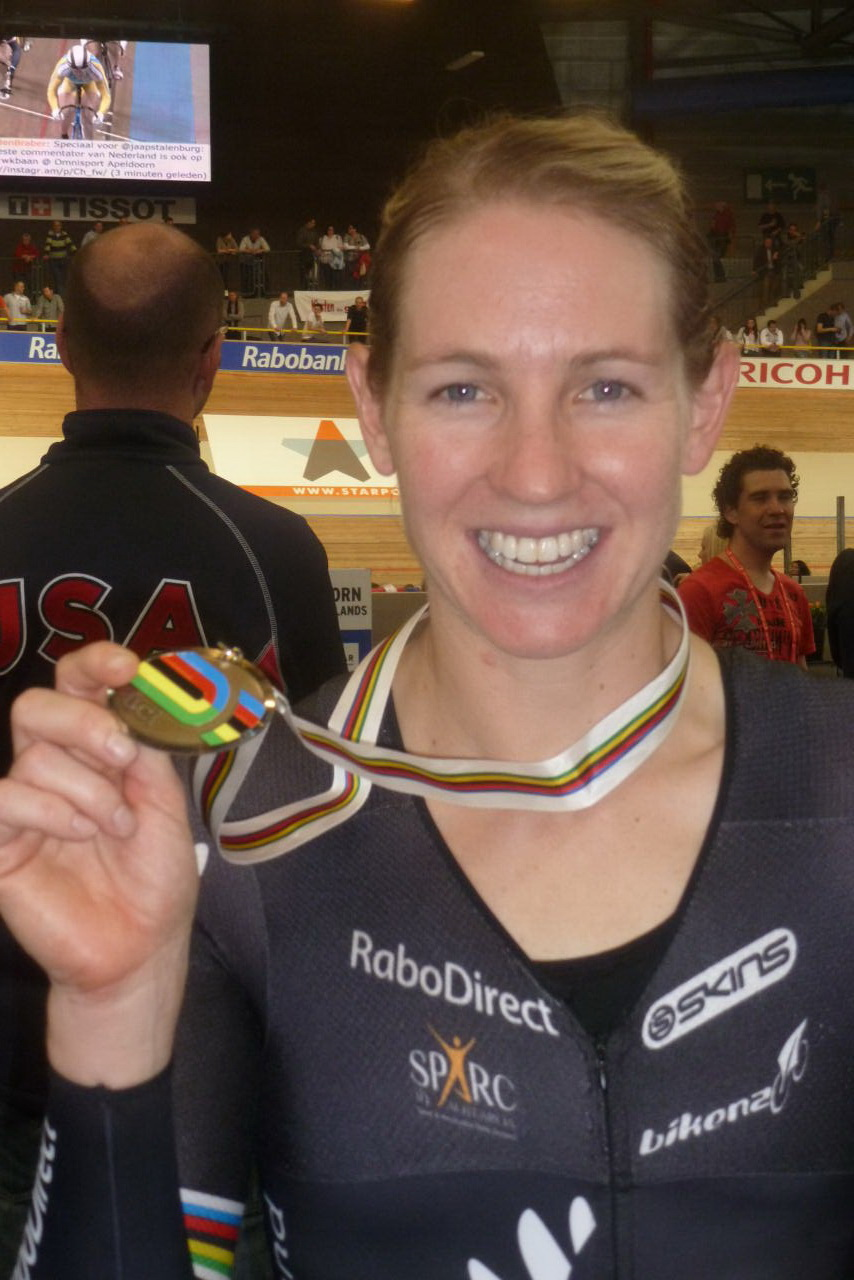

Personal information
- Born: 13 December 1982 (age 43) Dunedin, New Zealand
- Height: 1.71 m (5 ft 7 in)
- Weight: 63 kg (139 lb)

Cycling career
- Sport: Cycling
- Disciplines: Track & Road
- Role: Rider
- Rider type: Pursuit/Time-trial

Professional team
- 2007–2008: Jazz Apple Cycling Team
Medal record
Representing New Zealand
Women's track cycling
World Championships
Gold medal – first place	2009 Pruszków	Individual pursuit
Gold medal – first place	2012 Melbourne	Individual pursuit
Silver medal – second place	2009 Pruszków	Team pursuit
Silver medal – second place	2011 Apeldoorn	Individual pursuit
Bronze medal – third place	2010 Ballerup	Team pursuit
Bronze medal – third place	2010 Ballerup	Individual pursuit
Bronze medal – third place	2011 Apeldoorn	Team pursuit
Commonwealth Games
Gold medal – first place	2010 Delhi	Individual pursuit

Alison Shanks (born 13 December 1982) is a retired New Zealand professional racing cyclist, specialising in the individual pursuit and team pursuit in track cycling and individual time trial in road bicycle racing. Prior to that she was an Otago Rebels netballer, the sport she played for more than five years before her cycling career.

== Cycling career ==
Shanks began cycling in 2005, and soon enjoyed success. After more than five years competing for the Otago Rebels in the National Bank Cup netball, she competed at the 2006 Commonwealth Games in Melbourne where she finished fourth in the pursuit. She placed eighth in the pursuit during her first appearance at the World Championships in 2006, and improved on this to finish seventh in 2007.

Shanks competed at the 2008 Summer Olympics in the individual pursuit, where she placed 4th overall after being defeated by Lesya Kalytovska of Ukraine in the bronze medal match. Prior to this, in defeating Sarah Hammer of the United States in her semifinal, she set a new personal best of 3:32.478 minutes.

She began her 2009 season by competing in the 2008–2009 UCI Track Cycling World Cup Classics in Beijing, she lowered her personal best once more with a time of 3:30.685 to take the gold medal. Shanks also rode the team pursuit with Kaytee Boyd and Lauren Ellis, in a time of 3:28.044, becoming the fastest qualifiers. They went on to take the gold medal in a time of 3:24.421, setting the second fastest time in the world behind the 3:22.425 world record set by Great Britain at Manchester in 2008.

Shanks then continued her great form by winning the 2009 UCI Track Cycling World Championships individual pursuit in Pruskow, Poland on 25 March in a time of 3:29.807 beating Wendy Houvenaghel of Great Britain. She finished 2nd in the team pursuit.

At the 2010 Commonwealth Games, Shanks won a gold medal in the individual pursuit. She just nudged out Wendy Houvenaghel of Northern Ireland with a time of 3:30.875.

She won bronze at the 2010 UCI Track Cycling World Championships in the team pursuit, setting a world record. At the 2011 UCI Track Cycling World Championships she won silver in the individual pursuit and bronze in the team pursuit.

In 2012, she finished second at the individual pursuit at the Track Cycling World Cup in London. Then on 8 April 2012 Shanks won gold in the individual pursuit at the UCI Track Cycling World Championships in Melbourne, Australia with a time of 3:30.199.

At the 2012 Summer Olympics, she competed in the Women's team pursuit and placed 5th.

In road cycling she won the New Zealand National Road Race Championships in 2007 and placed 3rd in 2006. She won the New Zealand National Time Trial Championships in 2006 and 2007, placed 2nd in 2010 and placed 3rd four times.

Shanks retired from professional cycling early in 2014. She has since moved to Cambridge.

== Personal life ==
Born in Dunedin, New Zealand, on 13 December 1982, Shanks graduated from the University of Otago in 2005 with a BCom(Hons) in marketing and a BSc in human nutrition.
