= 2012 UCI Track Cycling World Championships – Women's individual pursuit =

Rainbow jersey

The Women's individual pursuit at the 2012 UCI Track Cycling World Championships was held on April 8. 22 athletes participated in the contest. After the qualification, the fastest 2 riders advanced to the Final and the 3rd and 4th fastest riders raced for the bronze medal.

== Medalists ==
Gold	Alison Shanks (NZL)
Silver	Wendy Houvenaghel (GBR)
Bronze	Ashlee Ankudinoff (AUS)

== Results ==
=== Qualifying ===
The qualifying was held at 15:00.

Rank	Name	Nation	Time	Notes
1	Alison Shanks	New Zealand	3:27.268	Q
2	Wendy Houvenaghel	Great Britain	3:27.842	Q
3	Amy Cure	Australia	3:28.474	Q
4	Ashlee Ankudinoff	Australia	3:28.869	Q
5	Tara Whitten	Canada	3:30.407	
6	Joanna Rowsell	Great Britain	3:31.187	
7	Vilija Sereikaitė	Lithuania	3:33.612	
8	Yelyzaveta Bochkaryova	Ukraine	3:34.471	
9	Caroline Ryan	Ireland	3:34.515	
10	Jaime Nielsen	New Zealand	3:35.286	
11	Jennie Reed	United States	3:35.359	
12	Lauren Ellis	New Zealand	3:37.925	
13	Vera Koedooder	Netherlands	3:38.099	
14	Venera Absalyamova	Russia	3:39.456	
15	Katarzyna Pawłowska	Poland	3:39.519	
16	Eugenia Bujak	Poland	3:39.610	
17	Madeleine Sandig	Germany	3:40.156	
18	Marlies Mejías	Cuba	3:40.371	
19	Maki Tabata	Japan	3:44.501	
20	Minami Uwano	Japan	3:44.644	
21	Svetlana Pauliukaitė	Lithuania	3:44.646	
22	Wong Wan Yiu	Hong Kong	3:47.976	

=== Finals ===
The finals were held at 19:00.

==== Small Final ====
Rank	Name	Nation	Time	Notes
3rd place, bronze medalist(s)	Ashlee Ankudinoff	Australia	3:33.593	
4	Amy Cure	Australia	3:33.642	

==== Final ====
Rank	Name	Nation	Time	Notes
1st place, gold medalist(s)	Alison Shanks	New Zealand	3:30.199	
2nd place, silver medalist(s)	Wendy Houvenaghel	Great Britain	3:32.340	
