= Borowiany, Opole Voivodeship =

Borowiany
- Village
- Location within Poland
- Coordinates: 50°44′36″N 18°19′16″E
- Country: Poland
- Voivodeship: Opole
- County: Olesno
- Gmina: Zębowice
- Population: 140

Borowiany [bɔrɔˈvjanɨ] is a village in the administrative district of Gmina Zębowice, within Olesno County, Opole Voivodeship, in south-western Poland.
