= 2009 UCI Track Cycling World Championships – Women's individual pursuit =

Rainbow jersey

The Women's Individual Pursuit was one of the 9 women's events at the 2009 UCI Track Cycling World Championships, held in Pruszków, Poland on 25 March 2009.

21 Cyclists from 19 countries participated in the contest. After the qualification, the fastest two riders advanced to the Final and the 3rd and 4th best riders raced for the bronze medal.

The qualification took place on 25 March and the Finals later the same day.

== World record ==
World Record
WR	3:24.537	Sarah Ulmer (NZL)	Athens (Greece)	22 August 2004

== Qualifying ==
Rank	Name	1000m	2000m	Time	Speed (km/h)	Q
Rank	Name	1000m	1000–2000	2000–3000	Speed (km/h)	Q
1	Wendy Houvenaghel (GBR)	1:11.502 (2)	2:19.492 (1)	3:29.491	51.553	QF
1	Wendy Houvenaghel (GBR)		1:07.990 (2)	1:09.999 (1)		
2	Alison Shanks (NZL)	1:12.659 (3)	2:20.300 (2)	3:31.063	51.169	QF
2	Alison Shanks (NZL)		1:07.641 (1)	1:10.763 (2)		
3	Vilija Sereikaitė (LTU)	1:10.619 (1)	2:20.955 (3)	3:33.935	50.482	QB
3	Vilija Sereikaitė (LTU)		1:10.336 (4)	1:12.980 (4)		
4	Joanna Rowsell (GBR)	1:13.013 (5)	2:23.025 (4)	3:35.028	50.226	QB
4	Joanna Rowsell (GBR)		1:10.012 (3)	1:12.003 (3)		
5	Josephine Tomic (AUS)	1:12.684 (4)	2:23.340 (5)	3:37.780	49.591	
5	Josephine Tomic (AUS)		1:10.656 (6)	1:14.440 (7)		
6	Ellen van Dijk (NED)	1:13.028 (6)	2:23.763 (6)	3:38.373	49.456	
6	Ellen van Dijk (NED)		1:10.735 (7)	1:14.610 (9)		
7	Tara Whitten (CAN)	1:14.215 (10)	2:25.064 (7)	3:38.962	49.323	
7	Tara Whitten (CAN)		1:10.849 (9)	1:13.898 (6)		
8	Svitlana Halyuk (UKR)	1:14.523 (11)	2:25.367 (8)	3:40.413	48.998	
8	Svitlana Halyuk (UKR)		1:10.844 (8)	1:15.046 (12)		
9	Leire Olaberria (ESP)	1:17.112 (20)	2:27.750 (12)	3:41.176	48.829	
9	Leire Olaberria (ESP)		1:10.638 (5)	1:13.426 (5)		
10	Verena Joos (GER)	1:14.759 (12)	2:27.680 (11)	3:42.611	48.515	
10	Verena Joos (GER)		1:12.921 (14)	1:14.931 (11)		
11	Charlotte Becker (GER)	1:15.441 (16)	2:28.042 (14)	3:42.821	48.469	
11	Charlotte Becker (GER)		1:12.601 (12)	1:14.779 (10)		
12	María Luisa Calle (COL)	1:15.824 (19)	2:27.486 (10)	3:42.930	48.445	
12	María Luisa Calle (COL)		1:11.662 (10)	1:15.444 (13)		
13	Jolien D'Hoore (BEL)	1:15.058 (13)	2:29.397 (17)	3:43.859	48.244	
13	Jolien D'Hoore (BEL)		1:14.339 (15)	1:14.462 (8)		
14	Lada Kozlíková (CZE)	1:13.358 (7)	2:25.834 (9)	3:43.880	48.240	
14	Lada Kozlíková (CZE)		1:12.476 (11)	1:18.046 (16)		
15	Aušrinė Trebaitė (LTU)	1:13.587 (8)	2:28.114 (15)	3:45.160	47.965	
15	Aušrinė Trebaitė (LTU)		1:14.527 (16)	1:17.046 (14)		
16	Dalila Rodríguez (CUB)	1:15.137 (14)	2:27.798 (13)	3:45.956	47.796	
16	Dalila Rodríguez (CUB)		1:12.661 (13)	1:18.158 (17)		
17	Olga Slyusareva (RUS)	1:15.229 (15)	2:29.799 (18)	3:47.161	47.543	
17	Olga Slyusareva (RUS)		1:14.570 (17)	1:17.362 (15)		
18	Tatsiana Sharakova (BLR)	1:13.937 (9)	2:28.868 (16)	3:47.636	47.444	
18	Tatsiana Sharakova (BLR)		1:14.931 (18)	1:18.768 (18)		
19	Edyta Jasińska (POL)	1:15.573 (17)	2:32.542 (19)	3:53.744	46.204	
19	Edyta Jasińska (POL)		1:16.969 (19)	1:21.202 (20)		
20	Gema Pascual (ESP)	1:15.722 (18)	2:33.528 (20)	3:56.365	45.692	
20	Gema Pascual (ESP)		1:17.806 (20)	1:22.837 (21)		
21	Chanpeng Nontasin (THA)	1:21.929 (21)	2:41.039 (21)	4:01.997	44.628	
21	Chanpeng Nontasin (THA)		1:19.110 (21)	1:20.958 (19)		

== Finals ==
Rank	Name	1000m	2000m	Time	Speed (km/h)
Rank	Name	1000m	1000–2000	2000–3000	Speed (km/h)
Gold Medal Race
	Alison Shanks (NZL)	1:12.977 (2)	2:20.885 (1)	3:29.807	51.475
	Alison Shanks (NZL)		1:07.908 (1)	1:08.922 (1)	
	Wendy Houvenaghel (GBR)	1:12.412 (1)	2:21.672 (2)	3:32.174	50.901
	Wendy Houvenaghel (GBR)		1:09.260 (2)	1:10.502 (2)	
Bronze Medal Race
	Vilija Sereikaitė (LTU)	1:11.772 (1)	2:21.537 (1)	3:33.583	50.565
	Vilija Sereikaitė (LTU)		1:09.765 (1)	1:12.046 (2)	
4	Joanna Rowsell (GBR)	1:13.770 (2)	2:25.057 (2)	3:35.209	50.183
4	Joanna Rowsell (GBR)		1:11.287 (2)	1:10.152 (1)	
