= Chen Yue =

Chinese cyclist

Cycling career
- Sport: Cycling
- Discipline: Track cycling
- Role: Rider

Chen Yue is a Chinese female track cyclist, and part of the national team. She competed in the team pursuit event at the 2009 UCI Track Cycling World Championships.
