= Katie Mactier =

Australian cyclist

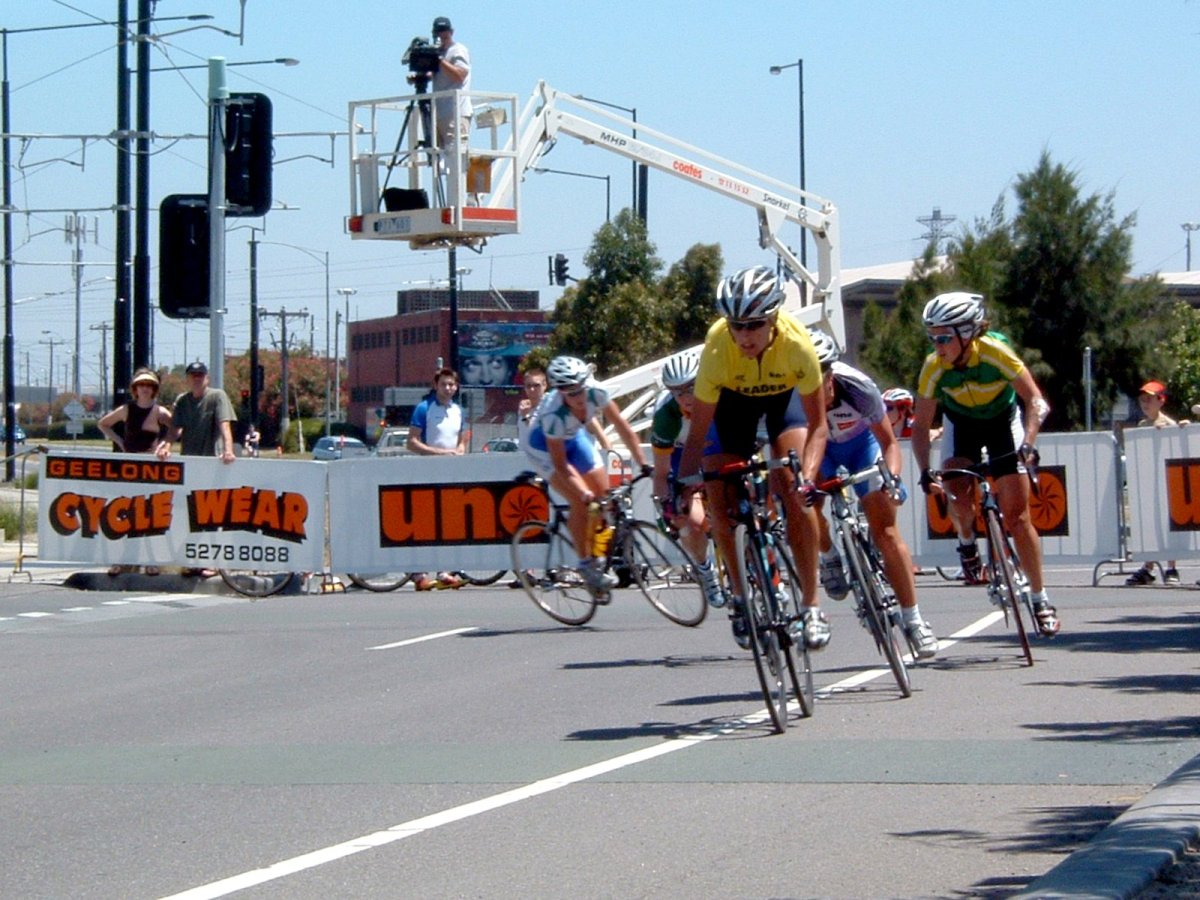
- Mactier in the 2006 Bay Cycling Classic

Personal information
- Full name: Katie Mactier
- Born: 23 March 1975 (age 51) Melbourne, Australia

Cycling career
- Sport: Cycling
- Disciplines: Track & Road
- Role: Rider

Professional teams
- 2002: SC Michela Fanini Record Rox
- 2003: Saturn (V)
- 2004: Jayco
- 2 June 2005–: T-Mobile
- 2007–: ValueAct Capital

Major wins
- (Australia) National Champion
Medal record
Representing Australia
Women's track cycling
World Championship
Gold medal – first place	2005 Los Angeles	Individual pursuit
Olympic Games
Silver medal – second place	2004 Athens	Individual Pursuit
Commonwealth Games
Silver medal – second place	2006 Melbourne	Individual Pursuit

Katie Mactier (born 23 March 1975 in Melbourne) is a former Australian professional racing cyclist. She began racing in 1999 at 24 and was an Australian Institute of Sport scholarship holder. She was educated at Wesley College, Melbourne.

She is a member of the Carnegie Caulfield Cycling Club. She lives in Melbourne, Australia with her two children.

She won the pursuit at the 2005 world championship, the 2005 World Cup and the 2006 Commonwealth Games in Melbourne. At the Cycling at the 2004 Summer Olympics Mactier broke the world record in the heats in the pursuit, but Sarah Ulmer set a new record in the final, relegating her to a silver medal.

In 2001 Mactier won in the national road championship. In 2002/2003 she was the Australian pursuit champion, and second in the 2003 world pursuit championship. She was 2003 and 2005 Australian Female Track Cyclist of the Year.

She was a favourite in the pursuit at the 2008 Olympics but ended seventh overall after being defeated by eventual winner Rebecca Romero of Great Britain in her qualifying round. After that, she retires from active sports.

== Palmarès ==
2001
1st Australian National Road Race Championships
1st Valdengo-Biella
1st Sprint Classification Skilled Bay Series
2003
1st Trofeo Guareschi
1st Overall Nature Valley Grand Prix
1st Overall Fitchburg Longsjo Classic
1st Stage 3 Geelong Women's Tour
1st (Australia) Pursuit, Australian National Track Championships
2nd Pursuit, World Championships
2nd Road World Cup Geelong
2nd Overall Geelong Women's Tour
2nd T-Mobile International
2004
1st (Australia) Pursuit, Australian National Track Championships
1st Stage 1 Geelong Tour
2nd Olympic Individual Pursuit (silver medal)
2nd Pursuit, World Championships
2nd Overall Geelong Tour
1st Pursuit, World Cup, Los Angeles
2005
1st Pursuit, World Championships
1st Pursuit, World Cup
1st Pursuit Oceania Titles
2006
1st (Australia) Pursuit, Australian National Track Championships
1st Jayco Bay Cycling Classic AUS
1st Individual Pursuit, 2006 Commonwealth Games 3:30.290;
1st Pursuit, World Cup, Sydney
2007
3rd Pursuit, World Championships
1st Australian National Road Race Championships
1st (Australia) Pursuit, Australian National Track Championships
1st Pursuit, World Cup, Sydney
1st Pursuit, World Cup, Beijing
1st Oceania Individual Pursuit
1st Stage 1 Mount Hood Cycling Classic
1st Stage 2 Mount Hood Cycling Classic
2nd Stage 6 Mount Hood Cycling Classic
2nd Stage 3 Nature Valley Grand Prix
3rd Stage 4 Mount Hood Cycling Classic
2008
1st Prelude, 2008 Tour de l'Aude Cycliste Féminin (cat. 1)
4th Individual pursuit, 2008 UCI Track Cycling World Championships
