= Wendy Houvenaghel =

Northern Irish former racing cyclist

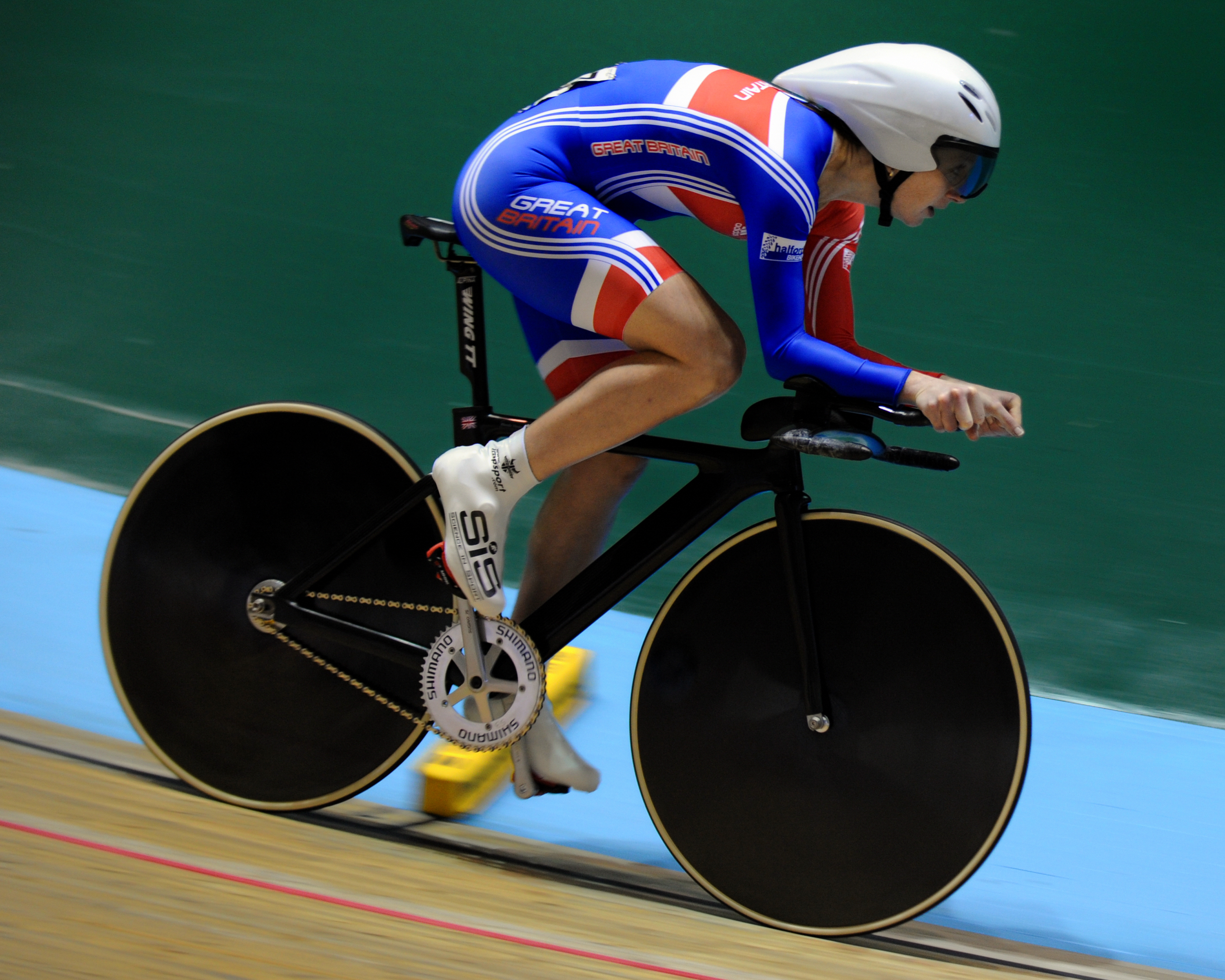
- At the world championships, 2008

Personal information
- Full name: Wendy Louise Houvenaghel
- Born: 27 November 1974 (age 51) Upperlands, County Londonderry, Northern Ireland
- Height: 1.78 m (5 ft 10 in)
- Weight: 60 kg (132 lb; 9 st 6 lb)

Cycling career
- Sport: Cycling
- Discipline: Track
- Role: Rider
- Rider type: Pursuit / Time-trialist

Amateur teams
- -2004: Camel Valley Cycling
- 2010-: Bike Chain Ricci

Professional teams
- 2005–2007: Science in Sport.com
- 2008–2009: Team Halfords Bikehut

Major wins
- (United Kingdom) National 3 km Pursuit Champion (2005, 2006, 2010); UCI World Cup 3 km Individual Pursuit Champion (2005/6, 2006/7, 2009/10) (United Kingdom) National Time Trial Circuit Champion (2003, 2007, 2011, 2012) (Europe) European Champion Team Pursuit (2010/11); UCI World Track Champion, Team Pursuit (2008, 2009, 2011)
Medal record
Representing Great Britain
Women's track cycling
Olympic Games
Silver medal – second place	2008 Beijing	Individual pursuit
World Championships
Gold medal – first place	2008 Manchester	Team Pursuit
Gold medal – first place	2009 Pruszków	Team Pursuit
Gold medal – first place	2011 Apeldoorn	Team Pursuit
Silver medal – second place	2010 Copenhagen	Team Pursuit
Silver medal – second place	2009 Pruszków	Individual Pursuit
Silver medal – second place	2010 Copenhagen	Individual Pursuit
Silver medal – second place	2012 Melbourne	Individual Pursuit
European Elite Championships
Gold medal – first place	2010 Pruszków	Team pursuit
Commonwealth Games
Representing Northern Ireland
Silver medal – second place	2010 Delhi	Individual Pursuit

Wendy Louise Houvenaghel (née McLean; born 27 November 1974) is a Northern Irish former racing cyclist from Upperlands, County Londonderry, Northern Ireland, riding on both the road and track, but specialising in the latter. She has represented Great Britain in various World Cycling Championships and in the 2008 Olympic Games, most notably winning the silver medal at the Beijing Olympic Games, and gold in the team pursuit at the 2008, 2009 and 2011 Track World Championships. She has also won many British national titles and represented England at the 2006 Commonwealth Games and Northern Ireland at the 2010 Commonwealth Games. Houvenaghel is based in Cornwall, England.

== Early life ==
Houvenaghel grew up in Upperlands near Maghera. She went to Ampertaine County Primary School in Upperlands and Rainey Endowed Grammar School in Magherafelt. She studied dentistry at the University of Dundee, where she met her husband. After qualifying, she became a dentist in the Royal Air Force, commissioned as a Flight Lieutenant on a Short Service Commission on 6 August 1998, and promoted to Squadron Leader on 6 August 2003. Completing her commission in August 2004, Houvenaghel took up a part-time post at a local dental surgery to help fund her ambitions as a cyclist. She was fast-tracked onto the Olympic Podium Plan by the British Cycling Federation in June 2006, with the aim of winning a medal at the Beijing Olympic Games in August 2008.

== Career ==
Houvenaghel took part in a cycling time trial in September 2002, with no cycling experience and became the National Circuit Time Trial Champion the following year. She was selected for the GB National squad in 2003 to compete at the World Time Trial Championships in Canada. Prior to this, she had competed in time trials within the UK for the amateur club Camel Valley. She continued her collection of National time trial titles in 2004, going on to win all British time-trials that she competed in during 2005, and continued in her success throughout 2006. In October 2005, Houvenaghel won her first 3 km Individual Pursuit National Track title which was soon followed up by two World Cup wins, aged 31. Houvenaghel was talent spotted by British Cycling and after physiological testing was fast tracked onto the Olympic Podium Programme tasked with winning a medal at the Beijing Olympic Games within a 2-year time frame.

Focusing on the track, she became the overall World Cup Champion in 2005/6 and made her GB World Track Championships debut in Bordeaux, ranking 5th. She competed for England on both the track and the road at the Commonwealth Games after being turned down for the Northern Ireland team by the British Cycling Federation. She retained her 3 km Individual Pursuit National title in 2006, and World Cup Champions title in 2006/7. She went one better to finish fourth in the 2007 World Championships, the following year in Majorca.

Just prior to 2008 season, Houvenaghel declared that her focus would be on the 3 km Pursuit Track World Championships and 2008 Olympic Games. During the Track World Championships in Manchester, after inconsistent winter training, she was a part of the gold medal-winning women's Team Pursuit. Having also set a personal best, ranking 4th in the Individual Pursuit, her potential to participate successfully at the Olympic Games was evident. On 15 August 2008 Houvenaghel qualified fastest in the qualification round of the Women's 3000m pursuit at the Beijing Olympics and went on to win the silver medal in the final, losing out on the gold to her teammate by 2 seconds. She won silver again in the same event at the 2009 Track World Championships in Poland, losing the final by 2 seconds after beating her opponent in the qualifying heats. She retained her World Championship title in the Women's Team Pursuit by qualifying fastest during the qualification ride and winning the final. The Individual Pursuit was not included in the Olympic Games in London in 2012, a decision which was ratified by the IOC and UCI mid December 2009.

Having become the World Championship and Commonwealth Games Silver Medallist in 2010, the Individual Pursuit National Champion turned her focus and attention to the Team Pursuit Olympic event for the 2010/11 and 2011/12 track seasons. Houvenaghel was a member of the British Team Pursuit team that won the European and World Championship Titles in the 2010/11 track season, finishing the season ranked as World Number One in the UCI World rankings in Dec 2011. Houvenaghel's 2011 World Championship title took her total to three in the discipline of Team Pursuiting.

Despite being a pivotal member of the Team Pursuit Olympic Qualification campaign, Houvenaghel was omitted from selection for racing this event at both the 2012 World Championships in Melbourne and Olympic Games in London. She was however, permitted to race the Individual Pursuit in Melbourne, earning a silver medal.

Houvenaghel had her most successful road campaign in 2012 winning her 4th British National Time Trial title as well as winning the Celtic Chrono and Chrono Champenois International Time Trials. Her performances on the road warranted her selection to compete at the Road World Championships in the Netherlands.

Houvenaghel announced her retirement from the sport on the eve of the 2014 Commonwealth Games after sustaining a back injury in training, forcing her to withdraw from the competition.

Houvenaghel won three World Championships competing for Great Britain in the Team Pursuit event and an Olympic silver medal in 2008 in Beijing in the Individual Pursuit. She was also a multiple European and National Champion.

In 2017 Houvenaghel had accused British Cycling of ageism and 'win-at-all-cost' culture.

=== Palmarès ===
2003
Gold British National Time Trial Circuit Championships

2004
Gold British National 10 mile Time Trial
Silver British National 25 mile Time Trial
Silver British National Time Trial Circuit Championships

2005
Gold British National 10 mile Time Trial
Gold British National 25 mile Time Trial
Bronze UCI 1.1 Chrono Champenois Time Trial, France
Gold British National Track Championships 3 km Pursuit
UCI Track World Cup Series Champion 3 km Pursuit 2005/6

Gold Sydney Round
Silver Moscow Round

2006
6th Commonwealth Games Time Trial, Melbourne
14th Commonwealth Games Road Race, Melbourne
5th UCI Track World Championships debut Bordeaux
Gold British National 10 mile time trial
Gold British National 25 mile time trial
Silver British National Time Trial Circuit Championships
4th UCI 1.1 Chrono Champenois Time Trial, France
Gold British National Track Championships 3 km Pursuit
UCI Track World Cup Series Champion 3 km Pursuit 2006/7

Gold Moscow Round
Silver Sydney Round

2007
4th UCI World Track Cycling Championships 3 km Pursuit Palma
Gold British National Time Trial Circuit Championships
NATIONAL RECORD 10 mile Time Trial

2008 (Team Halfords Bikehut)
Gold 2008 UCI Track Cycling World Championships, Team Pursuit Manchester
4th 2008 UCI Track Cycling World Championships, 3 km Pursuit Manchester
Silver 2008 Olympic Games 3 km Pursuit Beijing China
Gold UCI World Cup Manchester 3 km Individual Pursuit TRACK RECORD

2009
Gold UCI Track Cycling World Championships, Team Pursuit Poland
Silver UCI Track Cycling World Championships, 3 km Pursuit Poland
Silver British National Circuit Time Trial Championships
Gold UCI 1.1 Chrono Champenois Time Trial, France
Gold UCI Track World Cup 3 km Pursuit, Manchester
Gold UCI Track World Cup Team Pursuit, Manchester, World record
Gold UCI Track World Cup 3 km Pursuit, Melbourne
Silver UCI Track World Cup Team Pursuit, Melbourne

2010
Gold UCI Track World Cup 3 km Pursuit, Beijing
Silver UCI Track Cycling World Championships Team Pursuit, Copenhagen
Silver UCI Track Cycling World Championships 3km Pursuit, Copenhagen
Bronze British National Circuit Time Trial Championships
4th UCI 1.1 Chrono Champenois Time Trial, France
Gold National Track Championships 3 km Pursuit, Manchester
Silver Commonwealth Games 3 km Pursuit, India
6th Commonwealth Games Time Trial, India
Gold (Europe) European Track Championships Team Pursuit, Poland
Silver UCI Track World Cup 3 km Pursuit, Colombia
Bronze UCI Track World Cup Team Pursuit, Colombia

2011
Gold UCI Track World Cup Team Pursuit, Manchester
Gold UCI Track Cycling World Championships Team Pursuit, Apeldoorn
NATIONAL RECORD 25 Mile Time Trial
Gold British National Circuit Time Trial Championships
Bronze UCI 1.1 Chrono Champenois Time Trial, France
Bronze British National Track Championships 3 km Pursuit, Manchester
Silver UCI Track World Cup 3 km Pursuit, Colombia
Gold UCI Track World Cup Team Pursuit, Colombia
1st Team pursuit, 2010–11 UCI Track Cycling World Ranking

2012
Gold UCI Track World Cup Team Pursuit, London
Silve UCI Track Cycling World Championships 3 km Pursuit, Melbourne
Gold UCI 1.2 Celtic Chrono Time Trial, Belfast, N Ireland
Gold British National Circuit Time Trial Championships
Gold UCI 1.1 Chrono Champenois Time Trial, France
Silver Duo Normande Time Trial, France (with WO1 Sean Childs RNRMCA)
