= Cycling at the 2010 Asian Games =

- Venue: Guangzhou Velodrome; Dafushan Mountain Bike Course; Guangzhou Triathlon Venue
- Dates: 13–23 November 2010
- Competitors: 217 from 27 nations

Cycling at the 2010 Asian Games was held in Guangzhou, China. Road bicycle racing was held at the Triathlon Venue from November 20 to 23, while track cycling was contested at Guangzhou Velodrome from November 13 to 17, and mountain biking was contested at Dafushan Mountain Bike Course on November 18, and BMX racing was contested at Guangzhou Velodrome on November 19.

== Schedule ==
Q	Qualification	E	Elimination rounds	F	Finals

Event↓/Date →	13th Sat	14th Sun		15th Mon		16th Tue	17th Wed	18th Thu	19th Fri		20th Sat	21st Sun	22nd Mon	23rd Tue
BMX racing
Men									Q	F				
Women									Q	F				
Mountain bike
Men's cross-country								F						
Women's cross-country								F						
Road
Men's road race													F	
Men's individual time trial											F			
Women's road race														F
Women's individual time trial											F			
Track
Men's sprint		Q	E	E		E	F							
Men's keirin						E	F							
Men's individual pursuit	Q	E	F											
Men's points race						Q	F							
Men's team sprint	Q	F												
Men's team pursuit				Q	E	F								
Women's sprint		Q	E	E		E	F							
Women's 500 m time trial	F													
Women's individual pursuit	Q	E	F											
Women's points race						F								

== Medalists ==
=== BMX racing ===
Event	Gold	Silver	Bronze
Men	Steven Wong; Hong Kong	Akifumi Sakamoto; Japan	Masahiro Sampei; Japan
Women	Ma Liyun; China	Ayaka Miwa; Japan	Yue Cong; China

=== Mountain bike ===
Event	Gold	Silver	Bronze
Men's cross-country	Chan Chun Hing; Hong Kong	Kohei Yamamoto; Japan	Duan Zhiqiang; China
Women's cross-country	Ren Chengyuan; China	Shi Qinglan; China	Rie Katayama; Japan

=== Road ===
Event	Gold	Silver	Bronze
Men's road race	Wong Kam Po; Hong Kong	Takashi Miyazawa; Japan	Zou Rongxi; China
Men's individual time trial	Choe Hyeong-min; South Korea	Eugen Wacker; Kyrgyzstan	Hossein Askari; Iran
Women's road race	Hsiao Mei-yu; Chinese Taipei	Santia Tri Kusuma; Indonesia	Zhao Na; China
Women's individual time trial	Lee Min-hye; South Korea	Jiang Fan; China	Chanpeng Nontasin; Thailand

=== Track ===
Event	Gold	Silver	Bronze
Men's sprint	Zhang Lei; China	Tsubasa Kitatsuru; Japan	Yudai Nitta; Japan
Men's keirin	Azizulhasni Awang; Malaysia	Josiah Ng; Malaysia	Zhang Miao; China
Men's individual pursuit	Jang Sun-jae; South Korea	Cheung King Lok; Hong Kong	Li Wei; China
Men's points race	Vladimir Tuychiev; Uzbekistan	Wong Kam Po; Hong Kong	Mehdi Sohrabi; Iran
Men's team sprint	China; Zhang Lei; Zhang Miao; Cheng Changsong	Japan; Kazunari Watanabe; Yudai Nitta; Kazuya Narita	Iran; Farshid Farsinejadian; Mahmoud Parash; Hassan Ali Varposhti
Men's team pursuit	South Korea; Cho Ho-sung; Hwang In-hyeok; Jang Sun-jae; Park Seon-ho	Hong Kong; Cheung King Lok; Cheung King Wai; Choi Ki Ho; Kwok Ho Ting	China; Jiang Xiao; Li Wei; Wang Mingwei; Wang Jie
Women's sprint	Guo Shuang; China	Lin Junhong; China	Lee Wai Sze; Hong Kong
Women's 500 m time trial	Lee Wai Sze; Hong Kong	Guo Shuang; China	Hsiao Mei-yu; Chinese Taipei
Women's individual pursuit	Jiang Fan; China	Lee Min-hye; South Korea	Wu Chaomei; China
Women's points race	Liu Xin; China	Jamie Wong; Hong Kong	Chanpeng Nontasin; Thailand

== Medal table ==
Rank	Nation	Gold	Silver	Bronze	Total
1	China (CHN)	7	4	8	19
2	Hong Kong (HKG)	4	4	1	9
3	South Korea (KOR)	4	1	0	5
4	Malaysia (MAS)	1	1	0	2
5	Chinese Taipei (TPE)	1	0	1	2
6	Uzbekistan (UZB)	1	0	0	1
7	Japan (JPN)	0	6	3	9
8	Indonesia (INA)	0	1	0	1
8	Kyrgyzstan (KGZ)	0	1	0	1
10	Iran (IRI)	0	0	3	3
11	Thailand (THA)	0	0	2	2
Totals (11 entries)		18	18	18	54

== Participating nations ==
A total of 217 athletes from 27 nations competed in cycling at the 2010 Asian Games:

- Bahrain (2)
- China (29)
- Chinese Taipei (11)
- Hong Kong (13)
- India (14)
- Indonesia (4)
- Iran (11)
- Japan (24)
- Kazakhstan (12)
- Kyrgyzstan (1)
- Lebanon (2)
- Macau (2)
- Malaysia (15)
- Mongolia (5)
- Nepal (3)
- Philippines (6)
- Qatar (5)
- Saudi Arabia (6)
- Singapore (1)
- South Korea (22)
- Sri Lanka (2)
- Syria (3)
- Thailand (8)
- Timor-Leste (2)
- United Arab Emirates (3)
- Uzbekistan (5)
- Vietnam (6)
