= Cycling at the 2006 Asian Games =

- Venue: Doha Cycling Street Circuit; Al-Khor Road Course; Aspire Hall 1
- Dates: 3–14 December 2006
- Competitors: 211 from 26 nations

Cycling was contested at the 2006 Asian Games in Doha, Qatar. Road bicycle racing was held at the Cycling Street Circuit and the Al-Khor Circuit from December 3 to December 6, while Track cycling was contested at Aspire Hall 1 from December 9 to December 14. Both disciplines included competition for both men and women.

== Schedule ==
Q	Qualification	E	Elimination rounds	F	Finals

Event↓/Date →	3rd Sun	4th Mon	5th Tue	6th Wed	7th Thu	8th Fri	9th Sat	10th Sun		11th Mon		12th Tue	13th Wed		14th Thu	
Road
Men's road race	F															
Men's individual time trial			F													
Men's team time trial				F												
Women's road race		F														
Women's individual time trial			F													
Track
Men's sprint										Q	E	E	E	F		
Men's 1 km time trial							F									
Men's keirin															E	F
Men's individual pursuit							Q	F								
Men's points race												Q	F			
Men's madison															F	
Men's team sprint								Q	F							
Men's team pursuit										Q		F				
Women's sprint										Q		E	E	F		
Women's 500 m time trial							F									
Women's individual pursuit								Q		F						
Women's points race															F	

== Medalists ==
=== Road ===
==== Men ====
Event	Gold	Silver	Bronze
Road race	Wong Kam Po; Hong Kong	Mehdi Sohrabi; Iran	Park Sung-baek; South Korea
Individual time trial	Song Baoqing; China	Eugen Wacker; Kyrgyzstan	Andrey Mizurov; Kazakhstan
Team time trial	Kazakhstan; Ilya Chernyshov; Alexandr Dymovskikh; Dmitriy Gruzdev; Andrey Mizurov	Iran; Hossein Askari; Alireza Haghi; Ghader Mizbani; Abbas Saeidi Tanha	Japan; Yoshiyuki Abe; Kazuya Okazaki; Satoshi Hirose; Kazuhiro Mori

==== Women ====
Event	Gold	Silver	Bronze
Road race	Mayuko Hagiwara; Japan	Zhao Na; China	Han Song-hee; South Korea
Individual time trial	Li Meifang; China	Zulfiya Zabirova; Kazakhstan	Lee Min-hye; South Korea

=== Track ===
==== Men ====
Event	Gold	Silver	Bronze
Sprint	Tsubasa Kitatsuru; Japan	Choi Lae-seon; South Korea	Tang Qi; China
1 km time trial	Feng Yong; China	Yusho Oikawa; Japan	Kang Dong-jin; South Korea
Keirin	Kang Dong-jin; South Korea	Josiah Ng; Malaysia	Hiroyuki Inagaki; Japan
Individual pursuit	Jang Sun-jae; South Korea	Taiji Nishitani; Japan	Hwang In-hyeok; South Korea
Points race	Cheung King Wai; Hong Kong	Vladimir Tuychiev; Uzbekistan	Ilya Chernyshov; Kazakhstan
Madison	South Korea; Jang Sun-jae; Park Sung-baek	Kazakhstan; Ilya Chernyshov; Alexey Lyalko	Iran; Mehdi Sohrabi; Amir Zargari
Team sprint	Japan; Kazuya Narita; Yudai Nitta; Kazunari Watanabe	China; Feng Yong; Lin Feng; Zhang Lei	South Korea; Choi Lae-seon; Kang Dong-jin; Yang Hee-chun
Team pursuit	South Korea; Hwang In-hyeok; Jang Sun-jae; Kim Dong-hun; Park Sung-baek	Iran; Hossein Nateghi; Abbas Saeidi Tanha; Mehdi Sohrabi; Amir Zargari	China; Chen Xiaoyong; Wang Youguo; Wen Hairui; Zeng Zhaoyu

==== Women ====
Event	Gold	Silver	Bronze
Sprint	Guo Shuang; China	Gong Jinjie; China	You Jin-a; South Korea
500 m time trial	Guo Shuang; China	Hsiao Mei-yu; Chinese Taipei	You Jin-a; South Korea
Individual pursuit	Lee Min-hye; South Korea	Li Meifang; China	Wang Li; China
Points race	Li Yan; China	Lee Min-hye; South Korea	Chanpeng Nontasin; Thailand

== Medal table ==
Rank	Nation	Gold	Silver	Bronze	Total
1	China (CHN)	6	4	3	13
2	South Korea (KOR)	5	2	8	15
3	Japan (JPN)	3	2	2	7
4	Hong Kong (HKG)	2	0	0	2
5	Kazakhstan (KAZ)	1	2	2	5
6	Iran (IRI)	0	3	1	4
7	Chinese Taipei (TPE)	0	1	0	1
7	Kyrgyzstan (KGZ)	0	1	0	1
7	Malaysia (MAS)	0	1	0	1
7	Uzbekistan (UZB)	0	1	0	1
11	Thailand (THA)	0	0	1	1
Totals (11 entries)		17	17	17	51

== Participating nations ==
A total of 211 athletes from 26 nations competed in cycling at the 2006 Asian Games:

- Bahrain (10)
- China (20)
- Chinese Taipei (14)
- Hong Kong (7)
- Indonesia (7)
- Iran (12)
- Iraq (4)
- Japan (25)
- Kazakhstan (9)
- Kyrgyzstan (1)
- Lebanon (2)
- Macau (3)
- Malaysia (13)
- Mongolia (5)
- North Korea (3)
- Pakistan (3)
- Philippines (13)
- Qatar (6)
- Saudi Arabia (5)
- South Korea (18)
- Sri Lanka (7)
- Syria (6)
- Thailand (4)
- United Arab Emirates (5)
- Uzbekistan (5)
- Vietnam (4)
