= 2010 Asian Cycling Championships =

- Venue: Sharjah, United Arab Emirates
- Date: 9–17 April 2010
- Velodrome: Zayed Velodrome

The 2010 Asian Cycling Championships took place at the Zayed Velodrome in Sharjah, United Arab Emirates from 9 to 17 April 2010.

== Medal summary ==
=== Road ===
==== Men ====
Event	Gold	Silver	Bronze
Individual road race	Mehdi Sohrabi; Iran	Takashi Miyazawa; Japan	Hossein Nateghi; Iran
Individual time trial	Andrey Mizurov; Kazakhstan	Hossein Askari; Iran	Eugen Wacker; Kyrgyzstan

==== Women ====
Event	Gold	Silver	Bronze
Individual road race	You Jin-a; South Korea	Natalya Stefanskaya; Kazakhstan	Jutatip Maneephan; Thailand
Individual time trial	Son Eun-ju; South Korea	Mayuko Hagiwara; Japan	Monrudee Chapookam; Thailand

=== Track ===
==== Men ====
Event	Gold	Silver	Bronze
Sprint	Zhang Miao; China	Kang Dong-jin; South Korea	Yudai Nitta; Japan
1 km time trial	Zhang Miao; China	Mohd Hafiz Sufian; Malaysia	Yudai Nitta; Japan
Keirin	Kazunari Watanabe; Japan	Kazuya Narita; Japan	Mohd Hafiz Sufian; Malaysia
Individual pursuit	Jang Sun-jae; South Korea	Feng Chun-kai; Chinese Taipei	Hossein Askari; Iran
Points race	Cho Ho-sung; South Korea	Amir Zargari; Iran	Kwok Ho Ting; Hong Kong
Scratch	Choe Hyeong-min; South Korea	Yevgeniy Sladkov; Kazakhstan	Turakit Boonratanathanakorn; Thailand
Omnium	Cho Ho-sung; South Korea	Kazuhiro Mori; Japan	Wu Po-hung; Chinese Taipei
Madison	South Korea; Jang Sun-jae; Park Seon-ho	Hong Kong; Wong Kam Po; Choi Ki Ho	Japan; Ryu Sasaki; Yu Motosuna
Team sprint	China; Cheng Changsong; Zhang Lei; Zhang Miao	Japan; Kazuya Narita; Yudai Nitta; Kazunari Watanabe	Iran; Farzin Arab; Hassan Ali Varposhti; Mahmoud Parash
Team pursuit	South Korea; Cho Ho-sung; Hwang In-hyeok; Jang Sun-jae; Park Seon-ho	China; Chen Pan; Jiang Xiao; Li Chuanmin; Wang Jie	Hong Kong; Cheung King Lok; Choi Ki Ho; Kwok Ho Ting; Wong Kam Po

==== Women ====
Event	Gold	Silver	Bronze
Sprint	Guo Shuang; China	Gong Jinjie; China	Lee Wai Sze; Hong Kong
500 m time trial	Guo Shuang; China	Lee Wai Sze; Hong Kong	Kim Won-gyeong; South Korea
Individual pursuit	Jiang Fan; China	Na Ah-reum; South Korea	Chanpeng Nontasin; Thailand
Points race	Mayuko Hagiwara; Japan	Jamie Wong; Hong Kong	Tang Kerong; China
Scratch	I Fang-ju; Chinese Taipei	Lee Min-hye; South Korea	Diao Xiaojuan; Hong Kong
Omnium	Na Ah-reum; South Korea	Diao Xiaojuan; Hong Kong	Hsiao Mei-yu; Chinese Taipei
Team sprint	China; Gong Jinjie; Lin Junhong	Chinese Taipei; Hsiao Mei-yu; Huang Ting-ying	Hong Kong; Lee Wai Sze; Meng Zhaojuan
Team pursuit	China; Jiang Fan; Jiang Wenwen; Liang Jing	South Korea; Lee Min-hye; Na Ah-reum; Son Eun-ju	Chinese Taipei; Hsiao Mei-yu; Huang Ho-hsun; Tseng Hsiao-chia

== Medal table ==
Rank	Nation	Gold	Silver	Bronze	Total
1	South Korea	9	4	1	14
2	China	8	2	1	11
3	Japan	2	5	3	10
4	Chinese Taipei	1	2	3	6
4	Iran	1	2	3	6
6	Kazakhstan	1	2	0	3
7	Hong Kong	0	4	5	9
8	Malaysia	0	1	1	2
9	Thailand	0	0	4	4
10	Kyrgyzstan	0	0	1	1
Totals (10 entries)		22	22	22	66
