= 2011 Asian Cycling Championships =

Asian Cycling Champs 2011

- Venue: Nakhon Ratchasima, Thailand
- Date: 9–19 February 2011
- Velodrome: King’s 80th Birthday Anniversary Velodrome

The 2011 Asian Cycling Championships took place at a velodrome within the King's 80th Birthday Sports Complex, Nakhon Ratchasima, Thailand from 9 to 19 February 2011.

== Medal summary ==
=== Road ===
==== Men ====
Event	Gold	Silver	Bronze
Individual road race	Yukiya Arashiro; Japan	Muradjan Khalmuratov; Uzbekistan	Hossein Askari; Iran
Individual time trial	Eugen Wacker; Kyrgyzstan	Dmitriy Gruzdev; Kazakhstan	Hossein Askari; Iran

==== Women ====
Event	Gold	Silver	Bronze
Individual road race	Hsiao Mei-yu; Chinese Taipei	Gu Sung-eun; South Korea	Jutatip Maneephan; Thailand
Individual time trial	Chanpeng Nontasin; Thailand	Son Eun-ju; South Korea	Jamie Wong; Hong Kong

=== Track ===
==== Men ====
Event	Gold	Silver	Bronze
Sprint	Tsubasa Kitatsuru; Japan	Zhang Miao; China	Azizulhasni Awang; Malaysia
1 km time trial	Mohd Rizal Tisin; Malaysia	Zhang Miao; China	Han Jae-ho; South Korea
Keirin	Kota Asai; Japan	Josiah Ng; Malaysia	Azizulhasni Awang; Malaysia
Individual pursuit	Jang Sun-jae; South Korea	Alireza Haghi; Iran	Kazushige Kuboki; Japan
Points race	Mohammad Rajabloo; Iran	Park Sung-baek; South Korea	Adiq Husainie Othman; Malaysia
Scratch	Jang Sun-jae; South Korea	Arvin Moazzami; Iran	Turakit Boonratanathanakorn; Thailand
Omnium	Cho Ho-sung; South Korea	Kwok Ho Ting; Hong Kong	Kazuhiro Mori; Japan
Madison	Hong Kong; Kwok Ho Ting; Choi Ki Ho	Iran; Alireza Haghi; Mohammad Rajabloo	Japan; Kazushige Kuboki; Taiji Nishitani
Team sprint	China; Zhang Lei; Zhang Miao; Cheng Changsong	Japan; Kazuki Amagai; Tsubasa Kitatsuru; Kota Asai	Malaysia; Josiah Ng; Mohd Edrus Yunus; Mohd Rizal Tisin
Team pursuit	South Korea; Jang Sun-jae; Park Sung-baek; Park Seon-ho; Park Keon-woo	Hong Kong; Cheung King Lok; Kwok Ho Ting; Cheung King Wai; Choi Ki Ho	Japan; Kazushige Kuboki; Yu Motosuna; Taiji Nishitani; Ryu Sasaki

==== Women ====
Event	Gold	Silver	Bronze
Sprint	Guo Shuang; China	Lin Junhong; China	Lee Wai Sze; Hong Kong
500 m time trial	Lee Wai Sze; Hong Kong	Guo Shuang; China	Fatehah Mustapa; Malaysia
Keirin	Guo Shuang; China	Park Eun-mi; South Korea	Gong Jinjie; China
Individual pursuit	Lee Ju-mi; South Korea	Chanpeng Nontasin; Thailand	Wu Chaomei; China
Points race	Na Ah-reum; South Korea	Wu Chaomei; China	Jamie Wong; Hong Kong
Scratch	Tseng Hsiao-chia; Chinese Taipei	Jamie Wong; Hong Kong	Jutatip Maneephan; Thailand
Omnium	Lee Min-hye; South Korea	Jutatip Maneephan; Thailand	Minami Uwano; Japan
Team sprint	China; Lin Junhong; Gong Jinjie	South Korea; Kim Won-gyeong; Lee Eun-ji	Hong Kong; Lee Wai Sze; Meng Zhaojuan
Team pursuit	China; Jiang Fan; Liang Jing; Jiang Wenwen	South Korea; Lee Min-hye; Na Ah-reum; Kim You-ri	Hong Kong; Meng Zhaojuan; Jamie Wong; Diao Xiaojuan

== Medal table ==
Rank	Nation	Gold	Silver	Bronze	Total
1	South Korea	7	6	1	14
2	China	5	5	2	12
3	Japan	3	1	5	9
4	Hong Kong	2	3	5	10
5	Chinese Taipei	2	0	0	2
6	Iran	1	3	2	6
7	Thailand	1	2	3	6
8	Malaysia	1	1	5	7
9	Kyrgyzstan	1	0	0	1
10	Kazakhstan	0	1	0	1
10	Uzbekistan	0	1	0	1
Totals (11 entries)		23	23	23	69
