= Cycling at the 2010 Asian Games – Men's team pursuit =

Men's team pursuit at the 2010 Asian Games
- Venue: Guangzhou Velodrome
- Date: 15–16 November 2010
- Competitors: 49 from 11 nations

Medalists
gold medal	South Korea; Cho Ho-sung, Hwang In-hyeok, Jang Sun-jae, Park Seon-ho
silver medal	Hong Kong; Cheung King Lok, Cheung King Wai, Choi Ki Ho, Kwok Ho Ting
bronze medal	China; Jiang Xiao, Li Wei, Wang Mingwei, Wang Jie

The men's 4 kilometres team pursuit competition at the 2010 Asian Games was held on 15 and 16 November at the Guangzhou Velodrome.

== Schedule ==
All times are China Standard Time (UTC+08:00)

Date	Time	Event
Monday, 15 November 2010	10:00	Qualifying
Monday, 15 November 2010	12:10	Round 1
Tuesday, 16 November 2010	10:12	Finals

== Records ==
Prior to this competition, the existing world, Asian and Games records were as follows.

World Record	Great Britain	3:53.314	Beijing, China	18 August 2008
Asian Record	China	4:10.737	Beijing, China	23 January 2010
Games Record	South Korea	4:12.746	Doha, Qatar	12 December 2006

== Results ==
Legend

- DSQ — Disqualified

=== Qualifying ===
Rank	Team	Time	Notes
1	Hong Kong (HKG); Cheung King Lok; Cheung King Wai; Choi Ki Ho; Kwok Ho Ting	4:12.834	
2	South Korea (KOR); Cho Ho-sung; Hwang In-hyeok; Jang Sun-jae; Park Seon-ho	4:14.319	
3	China (CHN); Chen Pan; Jiang Xiao; Li Chuanmin; Wang Jie	4:15.653	
4	Malaysia (MAS); Mohd Akmal Amrun; Adiq Husainie Othman; Amir Mustafa Rusli; Harrif Saleh	4:20.340	
5	Iran (IRI); Arvin Moazzami; Abbas Saeidi Tanha; Mehdi Sohrabi; Amir Zargari	4:21.022	
6	Japan (JPN); Kazuhiro Mori; Yu Motosuna; Taiji Nishitani; Ryu Sasaki	4:21.407	
7	Chinese Taipei (TPE); Hu Che-wei; Huang Hsin-hua; Liao Kuo-lung; Wu Po-hung	4:21.739	
8	Kazakhstan (KAZ); Andrey Kashechkin; Sergey Kuzin; Alexey Lyalko; Nikolay Ivanov	4:23.372	
9	India (IND); Atul Kumar; Vinod Malik; Satbir Singh; Sombir	4:33.221	
10	Qatar (QAT); Khalil Al-Rahman; Ahmed Al-Bardiny; Tareq Esmaeili; Moosa Khalfan Said	4:34.429	
11	Saudi Arabia (KSA); Ayman Al-Habriti; Bader Al-Yasin; Sultan Assiri; Jaber Majrashi	4:45.836	

=== Round 1 ===
==== Heat 1 ====
Rank	Team	Time	Notes
1	Iran (IRI); Alireza Haghi; Abbas Saeidi Tanha; Mehdi Sohrabi; Amir Zargari	4:15.225	
2	Malaysia (MAS); Mohd Akmal Amrun; Adiq Husainie Othman; Amir Mustafa Rusli; Mohd Rizal Tisin	4:18.596	

==== Heat 2 ====
Rank	Team	Time	Notes
1	China (CHN); Jiang Xiao; Li Wei; Wang Mingwei; Wang Jie	4:09.832	AR
—	Japan (JPN); Kazuhiro Mori; Yu Motosuna; Taiji Nishitani; Ryu Sasaki	DSQ	

==== Heat 3 ====
Rank	Team	Time	Notes
1	South Korea (KOR); Cho Ho-sung; Hwang In-hyeok; Jang Sun-jae; Park Seon-ho	4:06.598	AR
2	Chinese Taipei (TPE); Hu Che-wei; Huang Hsin-hua; Liao Kuo-lung; Wu Po-hung	Overlapped	

==== Heat 4 ====
Rank	Team	Time	Notes
1	Hong Kong (HKG); Cheung King Lok; Cheung King Wai; Choi Ki Ho; Kwok Ho Ting	4:08.835	
2	Kazakhstan (KAZ); Andrey Kashechkin; Sergey Kuzin; Nikolay Ivanov; Oleg Kashechkin	Overlapped	

==== Summary ====
Rank	Team	Time
1	South Korea (KOR)	4:06.598
2	Hong Kong (HKG)	4:08.835
3	China (CHN)	4:09.832
4	Iran (IRI)	4:15.225

=== Finals ===
==== Bronze ====
Rank	Team	Time	Notes
3rd place, bronze medalist(s)	China (CHN); Jiang Xiao; Li Wei; Wang Mingwei; Wang Jie	4:11.349	
4	Iran (IRI); Alireza Haghi; Arvin Moazzami; Mehdi Sohrabi; Amir Zargari	4:17.993	

==== Gold ====
Rank	Team	Time	Notes
1st place, gold medalist(s)	South Korea (KOR); Cho Ho-sung; Hwang In-hyeok; Jang Sun-jae; Park Seon-ho	4:07.875	
2nd place, silver medalist(s)	Hong Kong (HKG); Cheung King Lok; Cheung King Wai; Choi Ki Ho; Kwok Ho Ting	4:10.859	
