= Cycling at the 2010 Asian Games – Women's individual pursuit =

Women's individual pursuit at the 2010 Asian Games
- Venue: Guangzhou Velodrome
- Date: 13–14 November 2010
- Competitors: 16 from 10 nations

Medalists
gold medal	Jiang Fan	China
silver medal	Cheung King Lok	Hong Kong
bronze medal	Li Wei	China

The women's 3 kilometres individual pursuit competition at the 2010 Asian Games was held on 13 and 14 November at the Guangzhou Velodrome.

== Schedule ==
All times are China Standard Time (UTC+08:00)

Date	Time	Event
Saturday, 13 November 2010	14:31	Qualifying
Sunday, 14 November 2010	12:23	Round 1
Sunday, 14 November 2010	16:09	Finals

== Records ==
Prior to this competition, the existing world, Asian and Games records were as follows.

World Record	Sarah Hammer (USA)	3:22.269	Aguascalientes, Mexico	11 May 2010
Asian Record	Jiang Fan (CHN)	3:38.519	Ballerup, Denmark	24 March 2010
Games Record	Lee Min-hye (KOR)	3:44.146	Doha, Qatar	11 December 2006

== Results ==
=== Qualifying ===
Rank	Athlete	Time	Notes
1	Jiang Fan (CHN)	3:37.497	AR
2	Na Ah-reum (KOR)	3:43.823	
3	Lee Min-hye (KOR)	3:44.649	
4	Wu Chaomei (CHN)	3:46.282	
5	I Fang-ju (TPE)	3:49.054	
6	Jamie Wong (HKG)	3:50.109	
7	Tseng Hsiao-chia (TPE)	3:54.445	
8	Chanpeng Nontasin (THA)	3:54.871	
9	Mayuko Hagiwara (JPN)	3:55.356	
10	Minami Uwano (JPN)	3:55.620	
11	Yanthi Fuchianty (INA)	4:01.718	
12	Kimbeley Yap (MAS)	4:03.613	
13	Monrudee Chapookam (THA)	4:06.580	
14	Y. Sunita Devi (IND)	4:12.008	
15	Konsam Suchitra Devi (IND)	4:14.287	
16	Yelena Antonova (KAZ)	4:17.074	

=== Round 1 ===
==== Heat 1 ====
Rank	Athlete	Time	Notes
1	Wu Chaomei (CHN)	3:44.123	
2	I Fang-ju (TPE)	Overlapped	

==== Heat 2 ====
Rank	Athlete	Time	Notes
1	Lee Min-hye (KOR)	3:39.768	
2	Jamie Wong (HKG)	Overlapped	

==== Heat 3 ====
Rank	Athlete	Time	Notes
1	Na Ah-reum (KOR)	3:45.346	
2	Tseng Hsiao-chia (TPE)	Overlapped	

==== Heat 4 ====
Rank	Athlete	Time	Notes
1	Jiang Fan (CHN)	3:37.105	AR
—	Chanpeng Nontasin (THA)	Overlapped	

==== Summary ====
Rank	Athlete	Time
1	Jiang Fan (CHN)	3:37.105
2	Lee Min-hye (KOR)	3:39.768
3	Wu Chaomei (CHN)	3:44.123
4	Na Ah-reum (KOR)	3:45.346

=== Finals ===
==== Bronze ====
Rank	Athlete	Time	Notes
3rd place, bronze medalist(s)	Wu Chaomei (CHN)	3:46.281	
4	Na Ah-reum (KOR)	3:48.658	

==== Gold ====
Rank	Athlete	Time	Notes
1st place, gold medalist(s)	Jiang Fan (CHN)	3:38.768	
2nd place, silver medalist(s)	Lee Min-hye (KOR)	3:40.330	
