= 2012 Asian Cycling Championships =

- Venue: Kuala Lumpur, Malaysia
- Date: 8–18 February 2012
- Velodrome: Cheras Velodrome

The 2012 Asian Cycling Championships took place at the Cheras Velodrome in Kuala Lumpur, Malaysia from 8 to 18 February 2012.

== Medal summary ==
=== Road ===
==== Men ====
Event	Gold	Silver	Bronze
Individual road race	Wong Kam Po; Hong Kong	Mehdi Sohrabi; Iran	Taiji Nishitani; Japan
Individual time trial	Eugen Wacker; Kyrgyzstan	Dmitriy Gruzdev; Kazakhstan	Hossein Askari; Iran

==== Women ====
Event	Gold	Silver	Bronze
Individual road race	Hsiao Mei-yu; Chinese Taipei	Gu Sung-eun; South Korea	Jutatip Maneephan; Thailand
Individual time trial	Na Ah-reum; South Korea	Minami Uwano; Japan	Wang Cui; China

=== Track ===
==== Men ====
Event	Gold	Silver	Bronze
Sprint	Kazunari Watanabe; Japan	Azizulhasni Awang; Malaysia	Zhang Lei; China
1 km time trial	Mohd Edrus Yunus; Malaysia	Mahmoud Parash; Iran	Wu Lok Chun; Hong Kong
Keirin	Josiah Ng; Malaysia	Azizulhasni Awang; Malaysia	Kazunari Watanabe; Japan
Individual pursuit	Alireza Haghi; Iran	Cheung King Lok; Hong Kong	Vladimir Tuychiev; Uzbekistan
Points race	Kazuhiro Mori; Japan	Mohammad Rajabloo; Iran	Choi Seung-woo; South Korea
Scratch	Feng Chun-kai; Chinese Taipei	Turakit Boonratanathanakorn; Thailand	Harrif Saleh; Malaysia
Omnium	Alexey Lyalko; Kazakhstan	Jang Sun-jae; South Korea	Kwok Ho Ting; Hong Kong
Madison	Hong Kong; Cheung King Lok; Choi Ki Ho	Kazakhstan; Artyom Zakharov; Pavel Gatskiy	Iran; Amir Zargari; Abbas Saeidi Tanha
Team sprint	China; Cheng Changsong; Zhang Lei; Zhang Miao	Japan; Seiichiro Nakagawa; Yudai Nitta; Kazunari Watanabe	Iran; Ali Aliasgari; Mahmoud Parash; Mohammad Parash
Team pursuit	South Korea; Jang Sun-jae; Park Keon-woo; Park Seon-ho; Park Sung-baek	Hong Kong; Cheung King Lok; Cheung King Wai; Choi Ki Ho; Kwok Ho Ting	Kazakhstan; Sergey Kuzin; Alexey Lyalko; Dias Omirzakov; Artyom Zakharov

==== Women ====
Event	Gold	Silver	Bronze
Sprint	Lee Wai Sze; Hong Kong	Fatehah Mustapa; Malaysia	Shi Jingjing; China
500 m time trial	Lee Wai Sze; Hong Kong	Xu Yulei; China	Fatehah Mustapa; Malaysia
Keirin	Fatehah Mustapa; Malaysia	Xu Yulei; China	Lee Wai Sze; Hong Kong
Individual pursuit	Maki Tabata; Japan	Jamie Wong; Hong Kong	Huang Ho-hsun; Chinese Taipei
Points race	Jamie Wong; Hong Kong	Olga Drobysheva; Uzbekistan	Maki Tabata; Japan
Scratch	Diao Xiaojuan; Hong Kong	Panwaraporn Boonsawat; Thailand	Maki Tabata; Japan
Omnium	Huang Li; China	Hsiao Mei-yu; Chinese Taipei	Lee Min-hye; South Korea
Team sprint	China; Shi Jingjing; Xu Yulei	South Korea; Lee Eun-ji; Lee Hye-jin	Hong Kong; Diao Xiaojuan; Wang Xiao Fei
Team pursuit	China; Jiang Fan; Jiang Wenwen; Liang Jing	Japan; Kanako Kase; Maki Tabata; Minami Uwano	Chinese Taipei; Hsiao Mei-yu; Huang Ho-hsun; Tseng Hsiao-chia

== Medal table ==
Rank	Nation	Gold	Silver	Bronze	Total
1	Hong Kong	6	3	4	13
2	China	4	2	3	9
3	Japan	3	3	4	10
4	Malaysia	3	3	2	8
5	South Korea	2	3	2	7
6	Chinese Taipei	2	1	2	5
7	Iran	1	3	3	7
8	Kazakhstan	1	2	1	4
9	Kyrgyzstan	1	0	0	1
10	Thailand	0	2	1	3
11	Uzbekistan	0	1	1	2
Totals (11 entries)		23	23	23	69
