= Cycling at the 2006 Asian Games – Men's sprint =

Men's sprint at the 2006 Asian Games
- Venue: Aspire Hall 1
- Date: 11–13 December 2006
- Competitors: 18 from 10 nations

Medalists
gold medal	Tsubasa Kitatsuru	Japan
silver medal	Choi Lae-seon	South Korea
bronze medal	Tang Qi	China

The men's sprint competition at the 2006 Asian Games was held from 11 to 13 December at the Aspire Hall 1.

== Schedule ==
All times are Arabia Standard Time (UTC+03:00)

Date	Time	Event
Monday, 11 December 2006	09:30	Qualifying
Monday, 11 December 2006	13:10	1/8 finals
Tuesday, 12 December 2006	13:18	Quarterfinals
Wednesday, 13 December 2006	12:35	Semifinals
Wednesday, 13 December 2006	12:45	Race for 5th–8th places
Wednesday, 13 December 2006	14:37	Finals

== Records ==
Prior to this competition, the existing world, Asian and Games records were as follows.

World Record	Curt Harnett (CAN)	9.865	Bogotá, Colombia	28 September 1995
Asian Record	Kazuya Narita (JPN)	10.216	Moscow, Russia	6 November 2004
Games Record	Yuichiro Kamiyama (JPN)	10.567	Bangkok, Thailand	14 December 1998

== Results ==
Legend

- DNF — Did not finish
- DNS — Did not start
- REL — Relegated

=== Qualifying ===
Rank	Athlete	Time	Notes
1	Josiah Ng (MAS)	10.537	GR
2	Choi Lae-seon (KOR)	10.555	
3	Tang Qi (CHN)	10.571	
4	Tsubasa Kitatsuru (JPN)	10.586	
5	Wang Qiming (CHN)	10.655	
6	Mohd Rizal Tisin (MAS)	10.684	
7	Kazunari Watanabe (JPN)	10.738	
8	Jeon Yeong-gyu (KOR)	10.876	
9	Lin Kun-hung (TPE)	10.957	
10	Hung Chia-wei (TPE)	11.059	
11	Jan Paul Morales (PHI)	11.424	
12	Alireza Ahmadi (IRI)	11.482	
13	Badr Ali Shambih (UAE)	11.540	
14	Mohammad Abouheidari (IRI)	11.625	
15	Mohamed Husain (BRN)	12.712	
16	Farkad Jassim (IRQ)	12.959	
17	Ali Hassan Mansoor (BRN)	13.133	
18	Mohsen Fadhel (IRQ)	13.654	

=== 1/8 finals ===
==== Heat 1 ====
Rank	Athlete	Time
1	Josiah Ng (MAS)	
2	Farkad Jassim (IRQ)	DNS

==== Heat 2 ====
Rank	Athlete	Time
1	Choi Lae-seon (KOR)	11.302
2	Mohamed Husain (BRN)	

==== Heat 3 ====
Rank	Athlete	Time
1	Tang Qi (CHN)	11.359
2	Mohammad Abouheidari (IRI)	

==== Heat 4 ====
Rank	Athlete	Time
1	Tsubasa Kitatsuru (JPN)	11.099
2	Badr Ali Shambih (UAE)	

==== Heat 5 ====
Rank	Athlete	Time
1	Wang Qiming (CHN)	11.475
2	Alireza Ahmadi (IRI)	

==== Heat 6 ====
Rank	Athlete	Time
1	Mohd Rizal Tisin (MAS)	
2	Jan Paul Morales (PHI)	DNS

==== Heat 7 ====
Rank	Athlete	Time
1	Kazunari Watanabe (JPN)	11.481
2	Hung Chia-wei (TPE)	

==== Heat 8 ====
Rank	Athlete	Time
1	Jeon Yeong-gyu (KOR)	11.358
2	Lin Kun-hung (TPE)	

=== Quarterfinals B ===
==== Heat 1 ====
Rank	Athlete	Time
1	Lin Kun-hung (TPE)	
2	Farkad Jassim (IRQ)	DNS

==== Heat 2 ====
Rank	Athlete	Time
1	Hung Chia-wei (TPE)	12.012
2	Mohamed Husain (BRN)	

==== Heat 3 ====
Rank	Athlete	Time
1	Jan Paul Morales (PHI)	11.783
2	Mohammad Abouheidari (IRI)	

==== Heat 4 ====
Rank	Athlete	Time
1	Badr Ali Shambih (UAE)	11.851
2	Alireza Ahmadi (IRI)	

=== Quarterfinals ===
==== Heat 1 ====
Rank	Athlete	1st ride	2nd ride	Decider
1	Josiah Ng (MAS)	11.171	11.126	
2	Jeon Yeong-gyu (KOR)			

==== Heat 2 ====
Rank	Athlete	1st ride	2nd ride	Decider
1	Choi Lae-seon (KOR)	11.294	11.411	
2	Kazunari Watanabe (JPN)			

==== Heat 3 ====
Rank	Athlete	1st ride	2nd ride	Decider
1	Tang Qi (CHN)	11.315	11.040	
2	Mohd Rizal Tisin (MAS)			

==== Heat 4 ====
Rank	Athlete	1st ride	2nd ride	Decider
1	Tsubasa Kitatsuru (JPN)	11.712	10.938	
2	Wang Qiming (CHN)			

=== Race for 5th–8th places ===
Rank	Athlete	Time
1	Kazunari Watanabe (JPN)	11.156
2	Mohd Rizal Tisin (MAS)	
3	Wang Qiming (CHN)	
4	Jeon Yeong-gyu (KOR)	

=== Semifinals B ===
==== Heat 1 ====
Rank	Athlete	Time
1	Lin Kun-hung (TPE)	11.345
2	Badr Ali Shambih (UAE)	

==== Heat 2 ====
Rank	Athlete	Time
1	Jan Paul Morales (PHI)	11.651
2	Hung Chia-wei (TPE)	

=== Semifinals ===
==== Heat 1 ====
Rank	Athlete	1st ride	2nd ride	Decider
1	Tsubasa Kitatsuru (JPN)		11.131	11.154
2	Josiah Ng (MAS)	11.362		

==== Heat 2 ====
Rank	Athlete	1st ride	2nd ride	Decider
1	Choi Lae-seon (KOR)		11.417	11.900
2	Tang Qi (CHN)	11.196		

=== Finals B ===
==== Race for 11th–12th places ====
Rank	Athlete	Time
1	Hung Chia-wei (TPE)	11.798
2	Badr Ali Shambih (UAE)	

==== Race for 9th–10th places ====
Rank	Athlete	Time
1	Lin Kun-hung (TPE)	11.652
2	Jan Paul Morales (PHI)	

=== Finals ===
==== Bronze ====
Rank	Athlete	1st ride	2nd ride	Decider
1	Tang Qi (CHN)	11.248	11.505	
2	Josiah Ng (MAS)			

==== Gold ====
Rank	Athlete	1st ride	2nd ride	Decider
1	Tsubasa Kitatsuru (JPN)	11.532	REL	10.882
2	Choi Lae-seon (KOR)		DNF	

== Final standing ==
Rank	Athlete
1st place, gold medalist(s)	Tsubasa Kitatsuru (JPN)
2nd place, silver medalist(s)	Choi Lae-seon (KOR)
3rd place, bronze medalist(s)	Tang Qi (CHN)
4	Josiah Ng (MAS)
5	Kazunari Watanabe (JPN)
6	Mohd Rizal Tisin (MAS)
7	Wang Qiming (CHN)
8	Jeon Yeong-gyu (KOR)
9	Lin Kun-hung (TPE)
10	Jan Paul Morales (PHI)
11	Hung Chia-wei (TPE)
12	Badr Ali Shambih (UAE)
13	Alireza Ahmadi (IRI)
14	Mohammad Abouheidari (IRI)
15	Mohamed Husain (BRN)
16	Farkad Jassim (IRQ)
17	Ali Hassan Mansoor (BRN)
18	Mohsen Fadhel (IRQ)
