= 2007 Asian Cycling Championships =

- Venue: Bangkok, Thailand
- Date: 3–10 September 2007
- Velodrome: Huamark Velodrome

The 2007 Asian Cycling Championships took place at the Bangkok and Nakhon Ratchasima, Thailand from 3 to 10 September 2007.

== Medal summary ==
=== Road ===
==== Men ====
Event	Gold	Silver	Bronze
Individual road race	Takashi Miyazawa; Japan	Hossein Askari; Iran	Chan Chun Hing; Hong Kong
Individual time trial	Eugen Wacker; Kyrgyzstan	Hossein Askari; Iran	Vladimir Tuychiev; Uzbekistan

==== Women ====
Event	Gold	Silver	Bronze
Individual road race	Meng Lang; China	Noor Azian Alias; Malaysia	Gu Sung-eun; South Korea
Individual time trial	Li Meifang; China	Lee Min-hye; South Korea	Miho Oki; Japan

=== Track ===
==== Men ====
Event	Gold	Silver	Bronze
Sprint	Tsubasa Kitatsuru; Japan	Kazunari Watanabe; Japan	Josiah Ng; Malaysia
1 km time trial	Li Wenhao; China	Kang Dong-jin; South Korea	Mohd Rizal Tisin; Malaysia
Keirin	Azizulhasni Awang; Malaysia	Toshiaki Fushimi; Japan	Mahmoud Parash; Iran
Individual pursuit	Hwang In-hyeok; South Korea	Mehdi Sohrabi; Iran	Amir Zargari; Iran
Points race	Feng Chun-kai; Chinese Taipei	Kazuhiro Mori; Japan	Makoto Iijima; Japan
Scratch	Harrif Saleh; Malaysia	Reona Sumi; Japan	Suphat Theerawanitchanan; Thailand
Madison	South Korea; Jang Sun-jae; Jang Chan-jae	Japan; Makoto Iijima; Kazuhiro Mori	Iran; Mehdi Sohrabi; Amir Zargari
Team sprint	China; Feng Yong; Lin Feng; Zhang Lei	South Korea; Kang Dong-jin; Choi Lae-seon; Park Soo-hyun	Iran; Farshid Farsinejadian; Mahmoud Parash; Hassan Ali Varposhti
Team pursuit	China; Li Wei; Qu Xuelong; Chen Libin; Ma Teng	Iran; Amir Zargari; Alireza Haghi; Hossein Nateghi; Mehdi Sohrabi	South Korea; Jang Sun-jae; Jang Chan-jae; Hwang In-hyeok; Kim Tae-gyun

==== Women ====
Event	Gold	Silver	Bronze
Sprint	Guo Shuang; China	Zheng Lulu; China	Uyun Muzizah; Indonesia
500 m time trial	Hsiao Mei-yu; Chinese Taipei	Guo Shuang; China	Uyun Muzizah; Indonesia
Keirin	Zheng Lulu; China	Sakie Tsukuda; Japan	Gu Sung-eun; South Korea
Individual pursuit	Lee Min-hye; South Korea	Ha Seon-ha; South Korea	Satomi Wadami; Japan
Points race	Li Yan; China	Jamie Wong; Hong Kong	Satomi Wadami; Japan
Scratch	Son Hee-jung; South Korea	Gu Sung-eun; South Korea	Santia Tri Kusuma; Indonesia
Team sprint	China; Guo Shuang; Zheng Lulu	Indonesia; Uyun Muzizah; Santia Tri Kusuma	Thailand; Jutatip Maneephan; Wathinee Luekajorh

== Medal table ==
Rank	Nation	Gold	Silver	Bronze	Total
1	China	9	2	0	11
2	South Korea	4	5	3	12
3	Japan	2	6	4	12
4	Malaysia	2	1	2	5
5	Chinese Taipei	2	0	0	2
6	Kyrgyzstan	1	0	0	1
7	Iran	0	4	4	8
8	Indonesia	0	1	3	4
9	Hong Kong	0	1	1	2
10	Thailand	0	0	2	2
11	Uzbekistan	0	0	1	1
Totals (11 entries)		20	20	20	60
