= Cycling at the 2010 Asian Games – Women's road race =

Women's road race at the 2010 Asian Games
- Venue: Guangzhou Triathlon Venue
- Date: 23 November 2010
- Competitors: 28 from 16 nations

Medalists
gold medal	Hsiao Mei-yu	Chinese Taipei
silver medal	Santia Tri Kusuma	Indonesia
bronze medal	Zhao Na	China

The women's 100 kilometres road race competition at the 2010 Asian Games was held on 23 November.

== Schedule ==
All times are China Standard Time (UTC+08:00)

Date	Time	Event
Tuesday, 23 November 2010	09:00	Final

== Results ==
Legend

- DNF — Did not finish
- DNS — Did not start

Rank	Athlete	Time
1st place, gold medalist(s)	Hsiao Mei-yu (TPE)	2:47:46
2nd place, silver medalist(s)	Santia Tri Kusuma (INA)	2:47:46
3rd place, bronze medalist(s)	Zhao Na (CHN)	2:47:46
4	Natalya Stefanskaya (KAZ)	2:47:46
5	You Jin-a (KOR)	2:47:46
6	Na Ah-reum (KOR)	2:47:46
7	Jutatip Maneephan (THA)	2:47:46
8	Phạm Thị Thúy Liên (VIE)	2:47:46
9	Yanthi Fuchianty (INA)	2:47:46
10	Phan Thị Thùy Trang (VIE)	2:47:46
11	I Fang-ju (TPE)	2:47:46
12	Noor Azian Alias (MAS)	2:47:46
13	Marites Bitbit (PHI)	2:47:46
14	Mayuko Hagiwara (JPN)	2:47:46
15	Jamie Wong (HKG)	2:47:46
16	Kanako Nishi (JPN)	2:47:46
17	Gao Min (CHN)	2:47:46
18	Dinah Chan (SIN)	2:47:46
19	Chanpeng Nontasin (THA)	2:47:46
20	Mahitha Mohan (IND)	2:47:46
21	Yelena Antonova (KAZ)	2:47:46
22	Roba Helane (SYR)	2:47:46
23	Jamsrangiin Ölzii-Solongo (MGL)	2:47:46
24	Seba Al-Raai (SYR)	2:47:54
25	Lasanthi Gunathilaka (SRI)	2:47:54
26	Pana Chaudhary (IND)	2:48:41
—	Diao Xiaojuan (HKG)	DNF
—	Mariana Mohamad (MAS)	DNS
