= Cycling at the 2014 Asian Games – Women's individual time trial =

Women's individual time trial at the 2014 Asian Games
- Venue: Songdo Road Cycling Course
- Date: 27 September 2014
- Competitors: 10 from 10 nations

Medalists
gold medal	Na Ah-reum	South Korea
silver medal	Li Wenjuan	China
bronze medal	Jamie Wong	Hong Kong

The women's individual time trial competition at the 2014 Asian Games was held on 27 September.

== Schedule ==
All times are Korea Standard Time (UTC+09:00)

Date	Time	Event
Saturday, 27 September 2014	11:30	Final

== Results ==
Rank	Athlete	Time
1st place, gold medalist(s)	Na Ah-reum (KOR)	37:54.43
2nd place, silver medalist(s)	Li Wenjuan (CHN)	38:46.26
3rd place, bronze medalist(s)	Jamie Wong (HKG)	38:57.65
4	Dinah Chan (SIN)	39:54.17
5	Chanpeng Nontasin (THA)	40:01.55
6	Tüvshinjargalyn Enkhjargal (MGL)	40:06.68
7	Minami Uwano (JPN)	40:09.03
8	Tseng Hsiao-chia (TPE)	40:16.82
9	Razan Soboh (JOR)	42:00.54
10	Seba Al-Raai (SYR)	42:35.05
