= 2009 Asian Cycling Championships =

- Venue: Tenggarong and Samarinda, Indonesia
- Date: 14–20 August 2009
- Velodrome: Tenggarong Velodrome

The 2009 Asian Cycling Championships took place at the Tenggarong Velodrome in Tenggarong and Samarinda, Indonesia from 14 to 20 August 2009.

== Medal summary ==
=== Road ===
==== Men ====
Event	Gold	Silver	Bronze
Individual road race	Dmitriy Fofonov; Kazakhstan	Alexander Vinokourov; Kazakhstan	Valentin Iglinskiy; Kazakhstan
Individual time trial	Alexander Vinokourov; Kazakhstan	Andrey Mizurov; Kazakhstan	Eugen Wacker; Kyrgyzstan

==== Women ====
Event	Gold	Silver	Bronze
Individual road race	Tang Kerong; China	Hsiao Mei-yu; Chinese Taipei	Natalya Stefanskaya; Kazakhstan
Individual time trial	Tang Kerong; China	Chanpeng Nontasin; Thailand	Marina Andreichenko; Kazakhstan

=== Track ===
==== Men ====
Event	Gold	Silver	Bronze
Sprint	Azizulhasni Awang; Malaysia	Kazunari Watanabe; Japan	Bao Saifei; China
1 km time trial	Han Tao; China	Mohd Rizal Tisin; Malaysia	Wong Kin Chung; Hong Kong
Keirin	Kazunari Watanabe; Japan	Mohd Hafiz Sufian; Malaysia	Mahmoud Parash; Iran
Individual pursuit	Li Wei; China	Vladimir Tuychiev; Uzbekistan	Feng Chun-kai; Chinese Taipei
Points race	Vladimir Tuychiev; Uzbekistan	Kazuhiro Mori; Japan	Kwok Ho Ting; Hong Kong
Scratch	Mehdi Sohrabi; Iran	Ilya Chernyshov; Kazakhstan	Wong Kam Po; Hong Kong
Omnium	Kwok Ho Ting; Hong Kong	Wu Po-hung; Chinese Taipei	Ryu Sasaki; Japan
Madison	Hong Kong; Kwok Ho Ting; Wong Kam Po	Japan; Kazuhiro Mori; Masakazu Ito	Kazakhstan; Sergey Kuzin; Ilya Chernyshov
Team sprint	Malaysia; Azizulhasni Awang; Mohd Edrus Yunus; Mohd Rizal Tisin	Iran; Farzin Arab; Hassan Ali Varposhti; Alireza Ahmadi	China; Zhang Qiang; Bao Saifei; Han Tao
Team pursuit	China; Li Wei; Qu Xuelong; Ma Teng; Chen Libin	Iran; Arvin Moazzami; Alireza Haghi; Behnam Khosroshahi; Hossein Nateghi	Kazakhstan; Sergey Kuzin; Nikolay Ivanov; Anton Diganov; Alexey Kolessov; Maxim Gourov

==== Women ====
Event	Gold	Silver	Bronze
Sprint	Zheng Lulu; China	Gong Jinjie; China	Fatehah Mustapa; Malaysia
500 m time trial	Gong Jinjie; China	Lee Wai Sze; Hong Kong	Fatehah Mustapa; Malaysia
Keirin	Zheng Lulu; China	Hiroko Ishii; Japan	Jutatip Maneephan; Thailand
Individual pursuit	Wu Chaomei; China	Satomi Wadami; Japan	Chanpeng Nontasin; Thailand
Points race	Meng Lang; China	Chanpeng Nontasin; Thailand	Hiroko Ishii; Japan
Scratch	Meng Lang; China	Jamie Wong; Hong Kong	Thatsani Wichana; Thailand
Omnium	Santia Tri Kusuma; Indonesia	Sutharat Boonsawat; Thailand	Hsiao Mei-yu; Chinese Taipei
Team sprint	China; Zheng Lulu; Gong Jinjie	Chinese Taipei; Hsiao Mei-yu; Huang Ting-ying	Thailand; Jutatip Maneephan; Wathinee Luekajorh
Team pursuit	China; Meng Lang; Wu Chaomei; Tang Kerong	Thailand; Chanpeng Nontasin; Monrudee Chapookam; Wilaiwan Kunlapha	Indonesia; Haryati; Wahyuti Sri Rahayu; Fitriyani

== Medal table ==
Rank	Nation	Gold	Silver	Bronze	Total
1	China	13	1	2	16
2	Kazakhstan	2	3	5	10
3	Hong Kong	2	2	3	7
4	Malaysia	2	2	2	6
5	Japan	1	5	2	8
6	Iran	1	2	1	4
7	Uzbekistan	1	1	0	2
8	Indonesia	1	0	1	2
9	Thailand	0	4	4	8
10	Chinese Taipei	0	3	2	5
11	Kyrgyzstan	0	0	1	1
Totals (11 entries)		23	23	23	69
