= 2008 Asian Cycling Championships =

Cycling event in Nara, Japan

- Venue: Nara, Japan
- Date: 10–17 April 2008
- Velodrome: Nara Keirin Velodrome

The 2008 Asian Cycling Championships took place at the Nara Keirin Velodrome, Nara, Japan from 10 to 17 April 2008.

== Medal summary ==
=== Road ===
==== Men ====
| Event | Gold | Silver | Bronze |
|---|---|---|---|
| Individual road race | Fumiyuki Beppu; Japan | Temur Mukhamedov; Uzbekistan | Takashi Miyazawa; Japan |
| Individual time trial | Eugen Wacker; Kyrgyzstan | Alexey Kolessov; Kazakhstan | Yukiya Arashiro; Japan |

==== Women ====
| Event | Gold | Silver | Bronze |
|---|---|---|---|
| Individual road race | Gao Min; China | Miho Oki; Japan | Choi Hye-kyeong; South Korea |
| Individual time trial | Li Meifang; China | Liu Yongli; China | Mayuko Hagiwara; Japan |

=== Track ===
==== Men ====
| Event | Gold | Silver | Bronze |
|---|---|---|---|
| Sprint | Azizulhasni Awang; Malaysia | Choi Lae-seon; South Korea | Tang Qi; China |
| 1 km time trial | Mohd Rizal Tisin; Malaysia | Li Wenhao; China | Yudai Nitta; Japan |
| Keirin | Azizulhasni Awang; Malaysia | Kiyofumi Nagai; Japan | Choi Lae-seon; South Korea |
| Individual pursuit | Hossein Nateghi; Iran | Alexey Kolessov; Kazakhstan | Kim Dong-hun; South Korea |
| Points race | Ilya Chernyshov; Kazakhstan | Kazuhiro Mori; Japan | Vadim Shaekhov; Uzbekistan |
| Scratch | Reona Sumi; Japan | Temur Mukhamedov; Uzbekistan | Lee Wei-cheng; Chinese Taipei |
| Omnium | Wu Po-hung; Chinese Taipei | Alexey Lyalko; Kazakhstan | Kwok Ho Ting; Hong Kong |
| Madison | Hong Kong; Wong Kam Po; Kwok Ho Ting | Uzbekistan; Vadim Shaekhov; Temur Mukhamedov | South Korea; Shin Dong-hyun; Lee Chan-woo |
| Team sprint | China; Zhang Qiang; Tang Qi; Li Wenhao | Malaysia; Azizulhasni Awang; Mohd Rizal Tisin; Mohd Edrus Yunus | Japan; Kiyofumi Nagai; Tomohiro Nagatsuka; Yudai Nitta |
| Team pursuit | China; Li Wei; Qu Xuelong; Chen Libin; Ma Teng | Iran; Amir Zargari; Mostafa Seyed-Rezaei; Mehdi Sohrabi; Hossein Nateghi; Abbas Saeidi Tanha | Japan; Makoto Iijima; Kazuhiro Mori; Reona Sumi; Takayuki Kawanishi |

==== Women ====
| Event | Gold | Silver | Bronze |
|---|---|---|---|
| Sprint | Zheng Lulu; China | Gong Jinjie; China | Huang Ting-ying; Chinese Taipei |
| 500 m time trial | Gong Jinjie; China | Fatehah Mustapa; Malaysia | Huang Ting-ying; Chinese Taipei |
| Keirin | Zheng Lulu; China | Fatehah Mustapa; Malaysia | Jutatip Maneephan; Thailand |
| Individual pursuit | Li Wei; China | Ha Seon-ha; South Korea | Leow Hoay Sim; Malaysia |
| Points race | Kim Eun-hee; South Korea | Chanpeng Nontasin; Thailand | Li Wei; China |
| Scratch | Park Eun-mi; South Korea | Santia Tri Kusuma; Indonesia | Diao Xiaojuan; Hong Kong |
| Team sprint | China; Zheng Lulu; Gong Jinjie | Chinese Taipei; Hsiao Mei-yu; Huang Ting-ying | South Korea; You Jin-a; Lee Eun-ji |

== Medal table ==
| Rank | Nation | Gold | Silver | Bronze | Total |
|---|---|---|---|---|---|
| 1 | China | 9 | 3 | 2 | 14 |
| 2 | Malaysia | 3 | 3 | 1 | 7 |
| 3 | Japan | 2 | 3 | 6 | 11 |
| 4 | South Korea | 2 | 2 | 5 | 9 |
| 5 | Kazakhstan | 1 | 3 | 0 | 4 |
| 6 | Chinese Taipei | 1 | 1 | 3 | 5 |
| 7 | Iran | 1 | 1 | 0 | 2 |
| 8 | Hong Kong | 1 | 0 | 2 | 3 |
| 9 | Kyrgyzstan | 1 | 0 | 0 | 1 |
| 10 | Uzbekistan | 0 | 3 | 1 | 4 |
| 11 | Thailand | 0 | 1 | 1 | 2 |
| 12 | Indonesia | 0 | 1 | 0 | 1 |
| Totals (12 entries) | | 21 | 21 | 21 | 63 |
