= Cycling at the 2006 Asian Games – Women's points race =

Women's points race at the 2006 Asian Games
- Venue: Aspire Hall 1
- Date: 14 December 2006
- Competitors: 15 from 10 nations

Medalists
gold medal	Li Yan	China
silver medal	Lee Min-hye	Kazakhstan
bronze medal	Chanpeng Nontasin	Thailand

The women's 25 km points race competition at the 2006 Asian Games was held on 14 December at the Aspire Hall 1.

== Schedule ==
All times are Arabia Standard Time (UTC+03:00)

Date	Time	Event
Thursday, 14 December 2006	12:45	Final

== Results ==
Legend

- DNF — Did not finish

Rank	Athlete	Sprint										Laps		Total	Finish order
Rank	Athlete	1	2	3	4	5	6	7	8	9	10	+	−	Total	Finish order
1st place, gold medalist(s)	Li Yan (CHN)	3	3					5	5	5	3			24	2
2nd place, silver medalist(s)	Lee Min-hye (KOR)	5	1	5			3	2	3	3	1			23	4
3rd place, bronze medalist(s)	Chanpeng Nontasin (THA)					1		3		2	5			11	1
4	Marites Bitbit (PHI)		5			2			1					8	12
5	Noor Azian Alias (MAS)				5						2			7	3
6	Uyun Muzizah (INA)	2				5								7	9
7	Gu Sung-eun (KOR)						5		2					7	13
8	I Fang-ju (TPE)			2		3				1				6	5
9	Wang Jianling (CHN)	1		3				1						5	14
10	Huang Ho-hsun (TPE)		2		1									3	7
11	Emiko Muranaka (JPN)				3									3	10
12	Jamie Wong (HKG)				2									2	6
13	Urraca Leow (MAS)						2							2	8
14	Banna Kamfoo (THA)													0	11
—	Satomi Wadami (JPN)			1			1							DNF	
