= Cycling at the 2006 Asian Games – Women's individual pursuit =

Women's individual pursuit at the 2006 Asian Games
- Venue: Aspire Hall 1
- Date: 10–11 December 2006
- Competitors: 13 from 9 nations

Medalists
gold medal	Lee Min-hye	South Korea
silver medal	Li Meifang	China
bronze medal	Wang Li	China

The women's 3 km individual pursuit competition at the 2006 Asian Games was held on 10 and 11 December at the Aspire Hall 1.

== Schedule ==
All times are Arabia Standard Time (UTC+03:00)

Date	Time	Event
Sunday, 10 December 2006	12:47	Qualifying
Monday, 11 December 2006	12:30	Finals

== Records ==
Prior to this competition, the existing world, Asian and Games records were as follows.

World Record	Sarah Ulmer (NZL)	3:24.537	Athens, Greece	22 August 2004
Asian Record	Lee Min-hye (KOR)	3:43.855	Sydney, Australia	18 November 2006
Games Record	Zhao Haijuan (CHN)	3:46.523	Busan, South Korea	5 October 2002

== Results ==
=== Qualifying ===
Rank	Athlete	Time	Notes
1	Lee Min-hye (KOR)	3:44.209	GR
2	Li Meifang (CHN)	3:47.288	
3	Urraca Leow (MAS)	3:50.146	
4	Wang Li (CHN)	3:52.105	
5	Ha Seon-ha (KOR)	3:52.682	
6	Huang Ho-hsun (TPE)	3:53.553	
7	Uyun Muzizah (INA)	3:54.006	
8	I Fang-ju (TPE)	3:54.680	
9	Satomi Wadami (JPN)	3:55.625	
10	Banna Kamfoo (THA)	3:59.789	
11	Chanpeng Nontasin (THA)	4:00.134	
12	Jamie Wong (HKG)	4:03.652	
13	Marites Bitbit (PHI)	4:07.199	

=== Finals ===
==== Bronze ====
Rank	Athlete	Time	Notes
3rd place, bronze medalist(s)	Wang Li (CHN)	3:49.489	
4	Urraca Leow (MAS)	3:50.891	

==== Gold ====
Rank	Athlete	Time	Notes
1st place, gold medalist(s)	Lee Min-hye (KOR)	3:44.146	GR
2nd place, silver medalist(s)	Li Meifang (CHN)	3:45.870	
