= Cycling at the 2010 Asian Games – Women's individual time trial =

Women's individual time trial at the 2010 Asian Games
- Venue: Guangzhou Triathlon Venue
- Date: 20 November 2010
- Competitors: 14 from 14 nations

Medalists
gold medal	Lee Min-hye	South Korea
silver medal	Jiang Fan	China
bronze medal	Chanpeng Nontasin	Thailand

The women's 35.6 kilometres individual time trial competition at the 2010 Asian Games was held on 20 November.

== Schedule ==
All times are China Standard Time (UTC+08:00)

Date	Time	Event
Saturday, 20 November 2010	13:10	Final

== Results ==
Legend

- DNF — Did not finish

Rank	Athlete	Time
1st place, gold medalist(s)	Lee Min-hye (KOR)	49:38.35
2nd place, silver medalist(s)	Jiang Fan (CHN)	50:04.62
3rd place, bronze medalist(s)	Chanpeng Nontasin (THA)	51:37.11
4	Tseng Hsiao-chia (TPE)	53:05.18
5	Mayuko Hagiwara (JPN)	53:11.69
6	Yelena Antonova (KAZ)	54:05.66
7	Dinah Chan (SIN)	54:38.30
8	Jamie Wong (HKG)	54:40.79
9	Marites Bitbit (PHI)	55:10.12
10	Y. Sunita Devi (IND)	56:00.87
11	Seba Al-Raai (SYR)	56:45.28
12	Jamsrangiin Ölzii-Solongo (MGL)	57:18.65
13	Lasanthi Gunathilaka (SRI)	59:08.18
—	Mariana Mohamad (MAS)	DNF
