= Cycling at the 2010 Asian Games – Women's points race =

Women's points race at the 2010 Asian Games
- Venue: Guangzhou Velodrome
- Date: 16 November 2010
- Competitors: 17 from 10 nations

Medalists
gold medal	Liu Xin	China
silver medal	Jamie Wong	Hong Kong
bronze medal	Chanpeng Nontasin	Thailand

The women's 20 kilometres points race competition at the 2010 Asian Games was held on 16 November at the Guangzhou Velodrome.

== Schedule ==
All times are China Standard Time (UTC+08:00)

Date	Time	Event
Tuesday, 16 November 2010	11:14	Final

== Results ==
Legend

- DNF — Did not finish

Rank	Athlete	Sprint								Laps		Total	Finish order
Rank	Athlete	1	2	3	4	5	6	7	8	+	−	Total	Finish order
1st place, gold medalist(s)	Liu Xin (CHN)	3	2	2	2	3		2		20		34	8
2nd place, silver medalist(s)	Jamie Wong (HKG)		3	1					3	20		27	2
3rd place, bronze medalist(s)	Chanpeng Nontasin (THA)			3				1	1	20		25	4
4	I Fang-ju (TPE)					1	5		5			11	1
5	Minami Uwano (JPN)					5	3		2			10	3
6	Lee Ju-mi (KOR)	2			1	2	2					7	5
7	Marites Bitbit (PHI)							5				5	9
8	Yanthi Fuchianty (INA)											0	6
9	Mahitha Mohan (IND)											0	7
10	Kimbeley Yap (MAS)											0	10
11	Santia Tri Kusuma (INA)		1		5		1	3			20	−10	12
12	Monrudee Chapookam (THA)										20	−20	11
—	Tang Kerong (CHN)		5									DNF	
—	Diao Xiaojuan (HKG)	5		3						20		DNF	
—	Konsam Suchitra Devi (IND)										20	DNF	
—	Mayuko Hagiwara (JPN)	1										DNF	
—	Na Ah-reum (KOR)			5						20		DNF	
