= Cycling at the 2006 Asian Games – Women's individual time trial =

Women's individual time trial at the 2006 Asian Games
- Venue: Al-Khor Road Course
- Date: 5 December 2006
- Competitors: 15 from 15 nations

Medalists
gold medal	Li Meifang	China
silver medal	Zulfiya Zabirova	Kazakhstan
bronze medal	Lee Min-hye	South Korea

The women's 23.8 km individual time trial competition at the 2006 Asian Games was held on 5 December at the Al-Khor Road Course.

== Schedule ==
All times are Arabia Standard Time (UTC+03:00)

Date	Time	Event
Tuesday, 5 December 2006	12:30	Final

== Results ==
Legend

- DNS — Did not start

Rank	Athlete	Time
1st place, gold medalist(s)	Li Meifang (CHN)	31:17.85
2nd place, silver medalist(s)	Zulfiya Zabirova (KAZ)	32:10.24
3rd place, bronze medalist(s)	Lee Min-hye (KOR)	33:37.57
4	Miyoko Karami (JPN)	33:53.60
5	Jamie Wong (HKG)	34:39.54
6	Chanpeng Nontasin (THA)	34:47.45
7	Marites Bitbit (PHI)	35:21.98
8	Huang Ho-hsun (TPE)	36:02.05
9	Kim Yong-ae (PRK)	36:20.72
10	Nguyễn Thị Hoàng Oanh (VIE)	36:41.81
11	Che Un Teng (MAC)	39:26.04
12	Raheela Bano (PAK)	44:59.64
13	Yasmen Salman (SYR)	45:37.11
—	Urraca Leow (MAS)	DNS
—	Jamsrangiin Ölzii-Solongo (MGL)	DNS
