= Cycling at the 2006 Asian Games – Women's sprint =

Women's sprint at the 2006 Asian Games
- Venue: Aspire Hall 1
- Date: 11–13 December 2006
- Competitors: 9 from 5 nations

Medalists
gold medal	Guo Shuang	China
silver medal	Gong Jinjie	China
bronze medal	You Jin-a	South Korea

The women's sprint competition at the 2006 Asian Games was held from 11 to 13 December at the Aspire Hall 1. Guo Shuang won the gold medal.

== Schedule ==
All times are Arabia Standard Time (UTC+03:00)

Date	Time	Event
Monday, 11 December 2006	09:46	Qualifying
Tuesday, 12 December 2006	13:07	Quarterfinals
Wednesday, 13 December 2006	12:30	Semifinals
Wednesday, 13 December 2006	12:41	Race for 5th–8th places
Wednesday, 13 December 2006	14:31	Finals

== Records ==
Prior to this competition, the existing world, Asian and Games records were as follows.

World Record	Olga Slyusareva (RUS)	10.831	Moscow, Russia	25 April 1993
Asian Record	Wang Yan (CHN)	11.172	Maebashi, Japan	6 June 1999
Games Record	Li Na (CHN)	11.675	Busan, South Korea	4 October 2002

== Results ==
Legend

- DNS — Did not start

=== Qualifying ===
Rank	Athlete	Time	Notes
1	Guo Shuang (CHN)	11.319	GR
2	Gong Jinjie (CHN)	11.645	
3	Hsiao Mei-yu (TPE)	11.957	
4	You Jin-a (KOR)	12.051	
5	Park Eun-mi (KOR)	12.188	
6	Sakie Tsukuda (JPN)	12.206	
7	Masumi Shinozaki (JPN)	12.651	
8	Pornnapa Uppachakham (THA)	13.778	
9	Monrudee Chapookam (THA)	14.046	

=== Quarterfinals ===
==== Heat 1 ====
Rank	Athlete	1st ride	2nd ride	Decider
1	Guo Shuang (CHN)	13.162	12.646	
2	Pornnapa Uppachakham (THA)			

==== Heat 2 ====
Rank	Athlete	1st ride	2nd ride	Decider
1	Gong Jinjie (CHN)	12.905	12.082	
2	Masumi Shinozaki (JPN)			

==== Heat 3 ====
Rank	Athlete	1st ride	2nd ride	Decider
1	Hsiao Mei-yu (TPE)		12.608	12.767
2	Sakie Tsukuda (JPN)	12.761		

==== Heat 4 ====
Rank	Athlete	1st ride	2nd ride	Decider
1	You Jin-a (KOR)		12.518	12.492
2	Park Eun-mi (KOR)	12.422		

=== Race for 5th–8th places ===
Rank	Athlete	Time
1	Park Eun-mi (KOR)	12.599
2	Masumi Shinozaki (JPN)	
3	Sakie Tsukuda (JPN)	
4	Pornnapa Uppachakham (THA)	DNS

=== Semifinals ===
==== Heat 1 ====
Rank	Athlete	1st ride	2nd ride	Decider
1	Guo Shuang (CHN)	11.878	12.275	
2	You Jin-a (KOR)			

==== Heat 2 ====
Rank	Athlete	1st ride	2nd ride	Decider
1	Gong Jinjie (CHN)	12.597	12.480	
2	Hsiao Mei-yu (TPE)			

=== Finals ===
==== Bronze ====
Rank	Athlete	1st ride	2nd ride	Decider
1	You Jin-a (KOR)	12.793	12.668	
2	Hsiao Mei-yu (TPE)			

==== Gold ====
Rank	Athlete	1st ride	2nd ride	Decider
1	Guo Shuang (CHN)	12.498	11.986	
2	Gong Jinjie (CHN)			

== Final standing ==
Rank	Athlete
1st place, gold medalist(s)	Guo Shuang (CHN)
2nd place, silver medalist(s)	Gong Jinjie (CHN)
3rd place, bronze medalist(s)	You Jin-a (KOR)
4	Hsiao Mei-yu (TPE)
5	Park Eun-mi (KOR)
6	Masumi Shinozaki (JPN)
7	Sakie Tsukuda (JPN)
8	Pornnapa Uppachakham (THA)
9	Monrudee Chapookam (THA)
