= Cycling at the 2006 Asian Games – Women's 500 metres time trial =

Women's 500 metres time trial at the 2006 Asian Games
- Venue: Aspire Hall 1
- Date: 9 December 2006
- Competitors: 5 from 5 nations

Medalists
gold medal	Guo Shuang	China
silver medal	Hsiao Mei-yu	Chinese Taipei
bronze medal	You Jin-a	South Korea

The women's 500 m time trial competition at the 2006 Asian Games was held on 9 December at the Aspire Hall 1.

== Schedule ==
All times are Arabia Standard Time (UTC+03:00)

Date	Time	Event
Saturday, 9 December 2006	14:12	Final

== Records ==
Prior to this competition, the existing world, Asian and Games records were as follows.

World Record	Anna Meares (AUS)	33.944	Sydney, Australia	18 November 2006
Asian Record	Jiang Yonghua (CHN)	34.000	Kunming, China	11 August 2002
Games Record	Jiang Yonghua (CHN)	35.304	Busan, South Korea	4 October 2002

== Results ==
Rank	Athlete	Time	Notes
1st place, gold medalist(s)	Guo Shuang (CHN)	35.175	GR
2nd place, silver medalist(s)	Hsiao Mei-yu (TPE)	36.190	
3rd place, bronze medalist(s)	You Jin-a (KOR)	36.961	
4	Sakiko Numabe (JPN)	37.415	
5	Monrudee Chapookam (THA)	43.388	
