= 2011–12 UCI Track Cycling World Cup – Round 1 – Women's team pursuit =

Round 1 – Women's team pursuit
2011–12 UCI Track Cycling World Cup, race 1/4

Race details
- Dates: 3–4 November 2011
- Stages: 1

Medalists
	Gold	Netherlands; Ellen van Dijk; Amy Pieters; Kirsten Wild
	Silver	China; Jiang Fan; Jiang Wenwen; Liang Jing
	Bronze	Germany; Lisa Brennauer; Charlotte Becker; Madeleine Sandig

The first round of the women's team pursuit of the 2011–12 UCI Track Cycling World Cup took place in Astana, Kazakhstan from 3 to 4 November 2011. 17 teams participated in the contest.

== Competition format ==
The women's team pursuit race consists of a 3 km race between two teams of three cyclists, starting on opposite sides of the track. If one team catches the other, the race is over.

The tournament consisted of an initial qualifying round. The top two teams in the qualifying round advanced to the gold medal match and the third and fourth teams advanced to the bronze medal race.

== Schedule ==
Thursday 3 November
Qualifying
Friday 4 November
19:38-19:53 Finals
20:11-20:19 Victory Ceremony

Schedule from Tissottiming.com

== Results ==
=== Qualifying ===
Rank	Country	Cyclists	Result	Notes
1	Netherlands	Ellen van Dijk; Vera Koedooder; Kirsten Wild	3:23.539	Q
2	China	Jiang Fan; Jiang Wenwen; Liang Jing	3:25.209	Q
3	Germany	Lisa Brennauer; Charlotte Becker; Madeleine Sandig	3:25.229	q
4	RusVelo	Evgenia Romanyuta; Venera Absalyamova; Viktoriya Kondel	3:25.652	q
5	Australia	Katherine Bates; Ashlee Ankudinoff; Sarah Kent	3:25.825	
6	Belarus	Tatyana Sharakova; Aksana Papko; Alena Dylko	3:26.546	
7	Belgium	Jolien D'Hoore; Kelly Druyts; Jessie Daams	3:31.320	
8	South Korea	Ahreum Na; Sungeun Gu; You Ri Kim	3:32.030	
9	Ukraine	Anna Nahirna; Svitlana Halyuk; Lesya Kalytovska	3:32.719	
10	Japan	Kanako Kase; Maki Tabata; Minami Uwano	3:34.704	
11	Russia	Svetlana Bubnenkova; Natalya Boyarskaya; Irina Molicheva	3:35.010	
12	Canada	Jasmin Glaesser; Gillian Carleton; Julia Bradley	3:35.363	
13	Poland	Katarzyna Pawłowska; Eugenia Bujak; Edyta Jasińska	3:37.652	
14	Hong Kong	Zhao Juan Meng; Wan Yiu Jamie Wong; Xiao Juan Diao	3:40.413	
15	Venezuela	Angie González; Lilibeth Chacón; Gleydimar Tapia Romero	3:57.763	
	Cunga Bikes	Caroline Ryan; Ciara Horne; Sinead Jennings		DNF
	Lithuania	Aušrinė Trebaitė; Vaida Pikauskaitė; Aleksandra Sošenko		DNF

Results from Tissottiming.com.

=== Finals ===
==== Final bronze medal race ====
Rank	Country	Cyclists	Result	Notes
3rd place, bronze medalist(s)	Germany	Lisa Brennauer; Charlotte Becker; Madeleine Sandig	3:21.701	
4	RusVelo	Evgenia Romanyuta; Venera Absalyamova; Viktoriya Kondel	3:22.086	

==== Final gold medal race ====
Rank	Country	Cyclists	Result	Notes
1st place, gold medalist(s)	Netherlands	Ellen van Dijk; Amy Pieters; Kirsten Wild	3:21.550	NR
2nd place, silver medalist(s)	China	Jiang Fan; Jiang Wenwen; Liang Jing	3:22.079	

Results from Tissottiming.com.
