= Cycling at the 2008 Summer Olympics – Women's points race =

Women's points race at the Games of the XXIX Olympiad
- Olympic Track cycling
- Venue: Laoshan Velodrome
- Dates: August 18
- Competitors: 22 from 22 nations

Medalists
1st place, gold medalist(s)		Marianne Vos	Netherlands
2nd place, silver medalist(s)		Yoanka González	Cuba
3rd place, bronze medalist(s)		Leire Olaberria	Spain

The women's points race at the 2008 Summer Olympics took place on August 18 at the Laoshan Velodrome in Beijing, China.

This track cycling event consists of a single race which is a 25 kilometre, 100 lap race. During the race, cyclists can score points in two ways; the cyclist with the most points at the end of the race wins. The first way to score points is to lap the group. Each time a cyclist gained a full lap on the peloton, she scored 20 points. If a cyclist lost a full lap to the peloton, however, she would lose 20 points. The other method of scoring points was to place in the intermediate sprints, held every 10 laps. The first four cyclists in each of those sprints would score, with the first finisher getting 5 points, the second 3, the third 2, and the fourth 1 point.

== Results ==
Rank	Name	Country	Sprint Points	Extra Laps	Total Points
Gold medal	Marianne Vos	Netherlands	10	1	30
Silver medal	Yoanka González	Cuba	18	0	18
Bronze medal	Leire Olaberria	Spain	13	0	13
4	María Luisa Calle	Colombia	13	0	13
5	Lesya Kalytovska	Ukraine	10	0	10
6	Katherine Bates	Australia	10	0	10
7	Pascale Jeuland	France	8	0	8
8	Olga Slyusareva	Russia	8	0	8
9	Gina Grain	Canada	6	0	6
10	Yan Li	China	6	0	6
11	Rebecca Romero	Great Britain	3	0	3
12	Svetlana Pauliukaite	Lithuania	2	0	2
13	Lada Kozlíková	Czech Republic	2	0	2
14	Vera Carrara	Italy	1	0	1
15	Wan Yiu Wong	Hong Kong	0	0	0
16	Evelyn García	El Salvador	0	0	0
17	Catherine Cheatley	New Zealand	0	0	0
18	Trine Schmidt	Denmark	0	0	0
19	Lee Min-Hye	South Korea	0	-2	-40
	Sarah Hammer	United States			DNF
	Satomi Wadami	Japan			DNF
	Verena Jooss	Germany		-1	DNF
