= Natalya Saifutdinova =

Kazakhstani cyclist (born 1989)

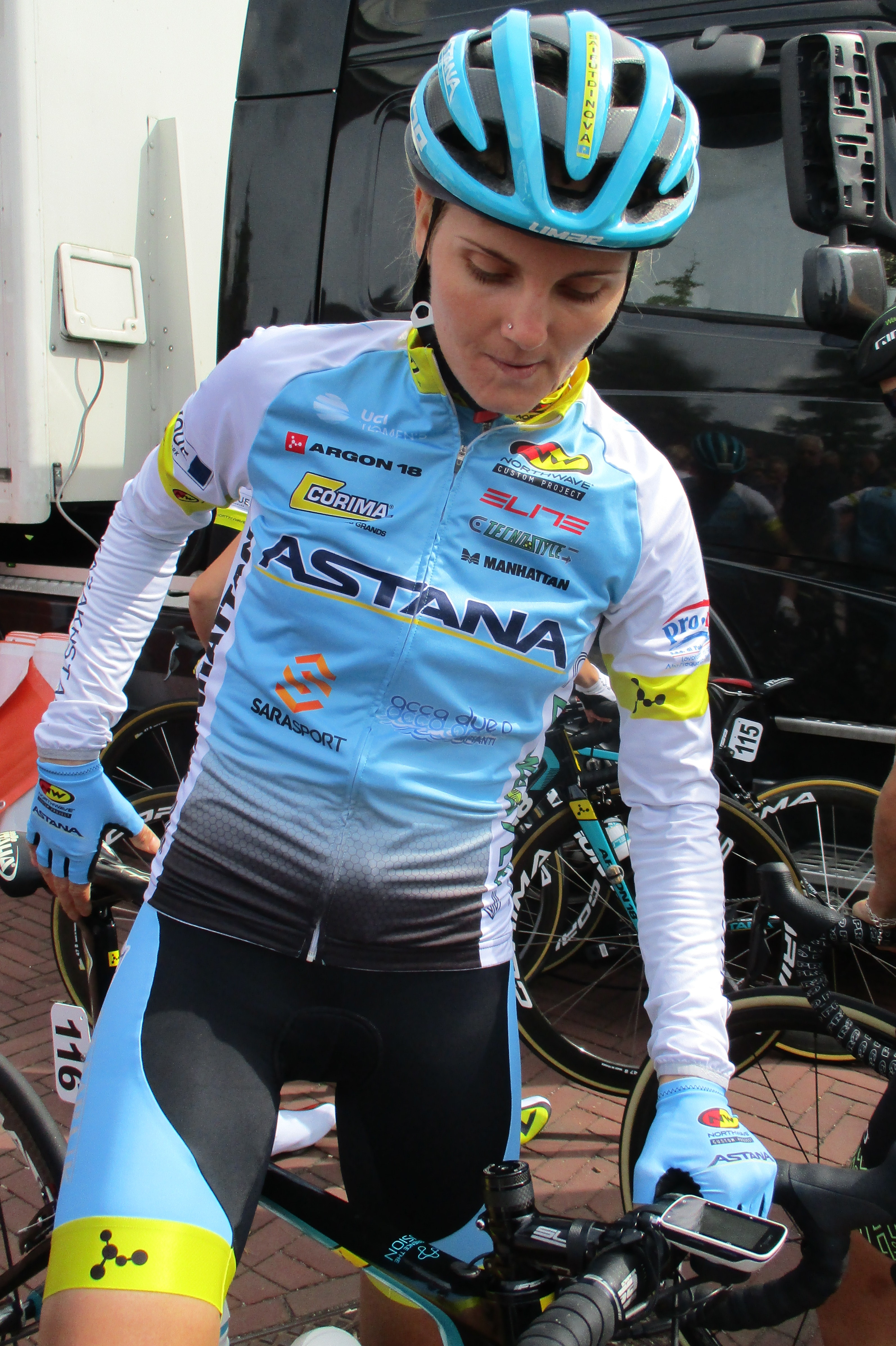
- Saifutdinova at the 2018 Holland Ladies Tour

Personal information
- Full name: Natalya Saifutdinova
- Born: Natalya Stefanskaya; 11 February 1989 (age 37): Petropavl, Kazakh SSR, Soviet Union; (now Kazakhstan)

Cycling career
- Sport: Cycling
- Discipline: Road
- Role: Rider

Professional team
- 2015–2020: Astana–Acca Due O

Natalya Saifutdinova (née Stefanskaya; born 11 February 1989) is a Kazakhstani professional racing cyclist, who most recently rode for UCI Women's Continental Team Astana. She rode in the women's road race at the 2015 UCI Road World Championships.

== Major results ==
2007
3rd Road race, National Road Championships
2009
National Road Championships

1st Road race
3rd Time trial

3rd Road race, Asian Road Championships
2010
1st Time trial, National Road Championships
2nd Road race, Asian Road Championships
4th Road race, Asian Games
2015
National Road Championships

1st Road race
2nd Time trial

2016
National Road Championships

1st Road race
2nd Time trial

2017
8th Overall Tour of Thailand
2018
National Road Championships

1st Road race
1st Time trial

Asian Games

9th Time trial
10th Road race

2019
2nd Team time trial, Asian Road Championships
2nd Time trial, National Road Championships
2020
7th Grand Prix Manavgat–Side
