= Makoto Iijima =

Japanese cyclist (born 1971)

Personal information
- Full name: Makoto Iijima; Japanese: 飯島 誠
- Born: 12 February 1971 (age 55) Hino, Tokyo, Japan
- Height: 1.69 m (5 ft 6 1/2 in)
- Weight: 63 kg (139 lb)

Cycling career
- Sport: Cycling
- Current team: Retired
- Disciplines: Road; Track
- Role: Rider

Professional teams
- 2005: Sumita Ravanello Pearl Izumi
- 2008–2010: Bridgestone–Anchor
- 2013: Gruppo–Acqua–Tama

Major wins
- Japanese National Time Trial Championships (1998, 2004, 2005)
Medal record
Representing Japan
Men's road cycling
Asian Games
Silver medal – second place	1998 Bangkok	Road race
Asian Championships
Silver medal – second place	2006 Kuala Lumpur	Time trial
Men's track cycling
Asian Games
Silver medal – second place	2002 Busan	Points race
Asian Championships
Gold medal – first place	2002 Bangkok	Points race
Gold medal – first place	2006 Kuala Lumpur	Points race
Silver medal – second place	2002 Bangkok	Elimination race
Silver medal – second place	2004 Yokkaichi	Elimination race
Silver medal – second place	2007 Bangkok	Madison
Bronze medal – third place	2005 Ludhiana	Points race
Bronze medal – third place	2005 Ludhiana	Team pursuit
Bronze medal – third place	2007 Bangkok	Points race
Bronze medal – third place	2008 Nara	Team pursuit

Makoto Iijima (飯島 誠, Iijima Makoto; born February 12, 1971) is a Japanese former professional road and track cyclist. Considered one of Japan's most successful cyclists in his decade, Iijima has claimed a total of nine track cycling medals (two golds, three silver, and four bronze) at the Asian Championships, two silvers at the Asian Games (1998 and 2002), and three national time trial titles at the Japanese Championships (1998, 2004, and 2005). He also represented his nation Japan in three editions of the Olympic Games (2000, 2004, and 2008). He announced his retirement from professional cycling in October 2010 as a member of the Bridgestone–Anchor team.

== Racing career ==
Iijima was born in Hino, Tokyo.

=== Amateur years ===
Despite earning his first career medal in road racing at the 1998 Asian Games in Bangkok, Thailand, Iijima made his official debut, as a 29-year-old, at the 2000 Summer Olympics in Sydney, where he finished sixteenth in the men's points race with a total score of six sprint points.

At the 2002 Asian Games in Busan, Iijima paired up with Shinichi Fukushima to grab a silver medal in the men's madison on 11 points, trailing behind the South Korean duo Suh Seok-Kyu and 2000 Olympian Cho Ho-Sung by an ample, twenty-seven point margin after ten intermediate sprint laps. In the same year, he outsprinted his brother Noriyuki Iijima and Hong Kong's Wong Kam Po to take the men's points race title at the Asian Championships in Bangkok, Thailand.

When he competed for the second time at the 2004 Summer Olympics in Athens, Iijima managed to finish the men's points race successfully in sixteenth place with 13 points, matching his position from Sydney four years earlier in the process.

=== Professional career ===
Iijima turned professional as a road rider in 2005, and eventually stayed with Sumita Ravanello Pearl Izumi for one cycling season, before he left himself without a contract. He was also crowned the winner Japanese National Time Trial Championships in the same year.

As a two-year free agent, Iijima redrafted his efforts to edge out Iran's Hossein Askari and Hong Kong's Cheung King Wai for his second career gold in the men's point race at the 2006 Asian Cycling Championships in Kuala Lumpur, Malaysia, adding a bronze in the men's time trial to his career resume. Later that year, at the Asian Games in Doha, Iijima narrowly missed the podium with a fourth-place finish in the points race (a total of ten) and sixth in the men's road race (3:45:05).

Eight years after his first Olympics, Iijima qualified for his third Japanese squad, as a 37-year-old and a cycling team captain, in the men's points race at the 2008 Summer Olympics in Beijing by receiving a berth from the UCI Track World Rankings. Iijima picked up a total of 23 points, and lapped the field once to score a career-high eighth place in a 25-kilometre (16-mile) sprint race. Strong results on his third Olympic bid landed him a spot on the Bridgestone–Anchor pro cycling team for three annual seasons.

At the 2009 East Asian Games in Macau, Iijima delivered the Japanese foursome of Kazuo Inoue, Kazuhiro Mori and Hayato Yoshida a gold-medal time of 1:38:38.84 in the men's team time trial, finishing ahead of the Chinese team by more than two minutes.

== Major results ==
1998
1st Time trial, National Road Championships
2nd Road race, Asian Games
1999
2nd Time trial, National Road Championships
2001
1st Stage 4 Perlis Open
2002
Asian Track Championships

1st Points race
2nd Elimination race

2nd Madison, Asian Games
3rd Points race, UCI Track Cycling World Cup Classics, Moscow
2003
2nd Time trial, National Road Championships
2004
Asian Track Championships

1st Points race
2nd Elimination race

1st Time trial, National Road Championships
2005
1st Time trial, National Road Championships
Asian Track Championships

3rd Points race
3rd Team pursuit

2006
Asian Cycling Championships

1st Points race
3rd Time trial

Tour de East Java

1st Stages 1 & 5

1st Stage 3 Tour de Kumano
1st Stage 3 Tour d'Indonesia
2nd Time trial, National Road Championships
Asian Games

4th Points race
6th Road race

2007
1st Stage 1 Jelajah Malaysia
1st Stage 3 Tour de Kumano
Asian Track Championships

2nd Madison
3rd Points race

2008
3rd Team pursuit, Asian Track Championships
8th Points race, Olympic Games
2009
1st Team time trial, East Asian Games
1st Stage 1 Jelajah Malaysia
National Road Championships

2nd Time trial
7th Road race

10th Overall Tour de Okinawa
2010
National Road Championships

3rd Time trial
8th Road race

10th Points race, UCI Track Cycling World Championships
2012
8th JBCF Simofusa Criterium
2013
2nd JBCF Makuhari Criterium
