= Lee Min-hye =

South Korean cyclist (1985–2018)

Personal information
- Full name: Lee Min-hye
- Born: 11 October 1985 Busan, South Korea
- Died: 12 November 2018 (aged 33)
- Height: 1.70 m (5 ft 7 in)
- Weight: 60 kg (132 lb; 9 st 6 lb)

Cycling career
- Sport: Cycling
- Disciplines: Road; Track
- Role: Rider

Professional team
- 2008: Team Specialized Designs for Women
Medal record
Representing South Korea
Women's road cycling
Asian Games
Gold medal – first place	2010 Guangzhou	Time trial
Bronze medal – third place	2006 Doha	Time trial
Asian Cycling Championships
Silver medal – second place	2006 Kuala Lumpur	Time trial
Bronze medal – third place	2006 Kuala Lumpur	Road race
Silver medal – second place	2007 Bangkok	Time trial
Women's track cycling
Asian Games
Gold medal – first place	2006 Doha	Individual pursuit
Silver medal – second place	2006 Doha	Points race
Silver medal – second place	2010 Guangzhou	Individual pursuit
Silver medal – second place	2014 Incheon	Team pursuit
Asian Cycling Championships
Gold medal – first place	2006 Kuala Lumpur	Individual pursuit
Gold medal – first place	2007 Bangkok	Individual pursuit
Gold medal – first place	2011 Nakhon Ratchasima	Omnium
Gold medal – first place	2013 New Delhi	Team pursuit
Silver medal – second place	2006 Kuala Lumpur	Team sprint
Silver medal – second place	2010 Sharjah	Scratch
Silver medal – second place	2010 Sharjah	Team pursuit
Silver medal – second place	2011 Nakhon Ratchasima	Team pursuit
Silver medal – second place	2013 New Delhi	Omnium
Silver medal – second place	2014 Astana	Team pursuit
Bronze medal – third place	2012 Kuala Lumpur	Omnium
Bronze medal – third place	2014 Astana	Omnium

Lee Min-hye (11 October 1985 – 12 November 2018) was a South Korean professional racing cyclist. Lee represented her country at the 2008 Summer Olympics in Beijing, finishing 19th in the points race. She achieved great success in a major international road racing competition at the 2010 Asian Games Individual Time Trial event by winning the gold medal in the 35.6-kilometre (22.1-mile) course in the time of 49 minutes and 38.35 seconds. She also competed at the 2012 Summer Olympics, in the women's omnium, finishing in 15th place.

In 2016, Lee was diagnosed with acute myeloid leukemia, and died on 12 November 2018.

== Major results ==
2003
3rd Scratch, UCI Juniors Track World Championships
2006
Asian Games

1st Individual pursuit
2nd Points race
3rd Time trial

Asian Track Championships

1st Individual pursuit
2nd Team sprint

Asian Road Championships

2nd Time trial
3rd Road race

2007
1st Individual pursuit, Asian Track Championships
1st GP Rund um Visp
2nd Time trial, Asian Road Championships
2nd Tour de Berne
2008
2nd Points race, 2007–08 UCI Track Cycling World Cup Classics, Los Angeles
2010
Asian Games

1st Time trial
2nd Individual pursuit

Asian Track Championships

2nd Scratch
2nd Team pursuit

2011
Asian Track Championships

1st Omnium
2nd Team pursuit

2012
3rd Omnium, Asian Track Championships
2013
Asian Track Championships

1st Team pursuit
2nd Omnium

2014
2nd Team pursuit, Asian Games (with Lee Chaek-Yung, Lee Ju-mi, Na A-reum, Son Hee-jung and Kim You-ri)
Asian Track Championships

2nd Team pursuit (with Lee Ju-mi, Na A-reum and Kim You-ri)
3rd Omnium

2015
3rd Time trial, National Road Championships
