= Mohd Rizal Tisin =

Malaysian track cyclist

Personal information
- Full name: Mohammad Rizal bin Tisin
- Nickname: Rizal
- Born: 20 June 1984 (age 42) Klang, Selangor, Malaysia
- Height: 1.79 m (5 ft 10 1/2 in)

Cycling career
- Sport: Cycling
- Discipline: Track
- Role: Rider
- Rider type: Sprinter

Professional team
- 2012: YSD Track Cycling Team
Medal record
Men's track cycling
Representing Malaysia
World Championships
Bronze medal – third place	2009 Pruszków	1 km time trial
Asian Championships
Gold medal – first place	2009 Tenggarong	Team sprint
Gold medal – first place	2006 Kuala Lumpur	Keirin
Gold medal – first place	2008 Nara	1 km time trial
Gold medal – first place	2011 Bangkok	1 km time trial
Silver medal – second place	2009 Tenggarong	1 km time trial
Silver medal – second place	2008 Nara	Team sprint
Bronze medal – third place	2011 Bangkok	Team sprint
Bronze medal – third place	2007 Bangkok	1 km time trial
Bronze medal – third place	2006 Kuala Lumpur	Team sprint
Bronze medal – third place	2005 Ludhiana	Team sprint
Commonwealth Games
Silver medal – second place	2010 Delhi	1 km time trial
Bronze medal – third place	2010 Delhi	Team sprint
Southeast Asian Games
Gold medal – first place	2007 Nakhon Ratchasima	1 km time trial
Gold medal – first place	2007 Nakhon Ratchasima	Team sprint

Mohammad Rizal bin Tisin (born 20 June 1984 in Klang, Selangor) is a Malaysian professional track cyclist. He represented Malaysia at the 2008 Summer Olympics, and later became the first Malaysian to claim a track cycling medal at the 2009 UCI World Championships and at the 2010 Commonwealth Games.

== Racing career ==
Tisin qualified for the Malaysian squad in the men's team sprint at the 2008 Summer Olympics in Beijing by receiving a berth for his team based on the nation's selection process from the UCI Track World Rankings. Tisin, along with his teammates Azizulhasni Awang and Josiah Ng, posted a sterling Malaysian record of 44.725 and an average speed of 60.368 km/h to grab a seventh spot for his team from the opening prelims, before losing out to France (44.822) in the first round match.

In 2009, Tisin established the nation's historic milestone by claiming the bronze for Malaysia in the men's four-lap kilometre time trial (a national record of 1:01.658) at the UCI Track Cycling World Championships in Pruszków, Poland.

At the 2010 Commonwealth Games in Delhi, India, Tisin took home the silver in the men's 1 km time trial (1:02.768), following shortly by his team campaign with a bronze medal effort in the men's sprint race (45.378). A month later, at the Asian Games in Guangzhou, Tisin and his teammates Awang and Ng could not replicate a striking effort in the same event after losing out the bronze medal match to Iran.

Tisin continued further to reach the summit of his career when he managed to add two more medals, including his gold in the 1 km time trial, at the 2011 Asian Cycling Championships in Nakhon Ratchasima, Thailand. Shortly after his fruitful success, Tisin sought his intention to return to the BMX track cycling, where he started his sporting career as a teenager. Tisin's hopes and decision to temporarily leave his sporting discipline were thereby pinned on selection for the 2012 Summer Olympics.

In June 2013, Tisin ended his short lapse to focus again on track cycling and gear up for future international competitions, following an unsatisfactory result and his decision to miss an opportunity for his second Olympic bid.

== Career highlights ==
2008

- 7th Olympic Games (Team sprint with Azizulhasni Awang and Josiah Ng), Beijing (CHN)

2009

- (bronze) UCI World Championships (1 km time trial), Pruszków (POL)
- 6th UCI World Championships (Team sprint), Pruszków (POL)

2010

- (silver) Commonwealth Games (1 km time trial), Delhi (IND)
- (bronze) Commonwealth Games (Team sprint with Azizulhasni Awang and Josiah Ng), Delhi (IND)
- 4th Asian Games (Team sprint with Azizulhasni Awang and Josiah Ng), Guangzhou (CHN)

2011

- (gold) Asian Championships (1 km time trial), Nakhon Ratchasima (THA)
- (bronze) Asian Championships (Team sprint), Nakhon Ratchasima (THA)
- 11th UCI World Championships (1 km time trial), Apeldoorn (NED)
- 15th UCI World Championships (Team sprint), Apeldoorn (NED)
- 42nd UCI World Championships (Keirin), Apeldoorn (NED)
