= Li Wenhao (cyclist) =

Chinese cyclist (born 1983)

Li Wenhao (Chinese: 李文浩; pinyin: Lǐ Wénhào; born 26 May 1983 in Tieling, Liaoning) is a Chinese Olympic cyclist. He competed for Team China at the 2008 Summer Olympics.

== Major performances ==
- 2006 Track National Championships – 3rd, 1 km time trial;
- 2007 Track Asian Championships – 1st, 1 km time trial;
- 2007 Track World Cup, Sydney – 2nd, 1 km time trial;
- 2007 Track World Cup, Beijing – 3rd, 1 km time trial;
- 2008 Track World Cup, Los Angeles – 3rd, 1 km time trial
- 2008 Track World Championships – 7th, team sprint;
- 2007–2008 – 1st world 1 km total points

== Records ==
- 2008 World Championships – 1:02.503, 1 km time trial (NR)
