= Seba Al-Raai =

Syrian cyclist

Personal information
- Born: 25 June 1982 (age 44) Syria

Cycling career
- Sport: Cycling
- Discipline: Road
- Role: Rider

Seba Al-Raai (born 25 June 1982) is a Syrian road cyclist. In 2011, she represented her nation at the 2011 UCI Road World Championships, placing 50th in the time trial, and the Tour de Feminin-O cenu Českého Švýcarska. She placed second in the road race at the 2014 Syrian National Championships.

== Major results ==
2011
10th Time trial, Asian Road Championships
10th Golan I
2012
8th Time trial, Asian Road Championships
2014
2nd Road race, National Road Championships
2015
National Road Championships

2nd Time trial
2nd Road race
