= Tsubasa Kitatsuru =

Japanese cyclist (born 1985)

Personal information
- Full name: Tsubasa Kitatsuru
- Born: 26 April 1985 (age 41) Kitakyushu, Fukuoka, Japan
- Height: 1.77 m (5 ft 9 1/2 in)
- Weight: 85 kg (187 lb)

Cycling career
- Sport: Cycling
- Discipline: Track
- Role: Rider
- Rider type: Sprinter

Amateur team
- -: Japan Professional Cycling Union

Professional team
- 2012: Cyclo Channel Tokyo
Medal record
Men's track cycling
Representing Japan
Asian Games
Gold medal – first place	2006 Doha	Sprint
Silver medal – second place	2010 Guangzhou	Sprint
Asian Championships
Gold medal – first place	2005 Ludhiana	Sprint
Gold medal – first place	2006 Kuala Lumpur	Sprint
Gold medal – first place	2007 Bangkok	Sprint
Gold medal – first place	2011 Bangkok	Sprint
Silver medal – second place	2004 Yokkaichi	Sprint
Silver medal – second place	2005 Ludhiana	Keirin

Tsubasa Kitatsuru (北津留 翼, Kitatsuru Tsubasa; born April 26, 1985 in Kitakyushu, Fukuoka) is a Japanese professional track cyclist. He has collected five Asian Championships and two Asian Games medals to his career hardware in men's sprint, and later represented Japan at the 2008 Summer Olympics. Kitatsuru currently races for the Japan Professional Cycling Union.

Emerging as one of Japan's most successful sprinters in track cycling, Kitatsuru sought sporting headlines at the 2006 Asian Games in Doha, where he defeated South Korea's Choi Lae-Seon in the decided with a best time of 10.882 seconds, making him the fifth Japanese rider in the Games' history to take home the men's sprint gold.

Kitatsuru qualified for his first Japanese squad, as a 23-year-old, in the men's sprint at the 2008 Summer Olympics in Beijing by receiving one of the team's four available berths based on UCI's selection process from the Track World Rankings. Kitatsuru lost his round-of-sixteen match-up against France's Mickaël Bourgain, and finished second in his repechage heat behind Malaysia's Azizulhasni Awang, thus eliminating him from the tournament. Earlier in the morning session, Kitatsuru grabbed a fourteenth seed with a time of 10.391.

At the 2010 Asian Games in Guangzhou, Kitatsuru missed his title defense to settle only for the silver medal in men' sprint, after losing out to host nation China's Zhang Lei on a two-race final match.

== Career highlights ==
2003

- (gold) UCI Junior Track World Championships (Keirin), Moscow (RUS)
- (gold) UCI Junior Track World Championships (Sprint), Moscow (RUS)

2004

- (silver) Asian Championships (Sprint), Yokkaichi, Mie (JPN)

2005

- (gold) Asian Championships (Sprint), Ludhiana (IND)
- (silver) Asian Championships (Keirin), Ludhiana (IND)

2006

- (gold) Asian Championships (Sprint), Kuala Lumpur (MAS)
- (gold) Asian Games (Sprint), Doha (QAT)

2007

- (gold) Asian Championships (Sprint), Kuala Lumpur (MAS)
- 23rd UCI World Championships (Sprint), Palma de Mallorca (ESP)

2008

- 14th Olympic Games (Sprint), Beijing (CHN)

2010

- (gold) Asian Games (Sprint), Guangzhou (CHN)

2011

- (gold) Asian Championships (Sprint), Nakhon Ratchasima (THA)
- 13th UCI World Championships (Sprint), Apeldoorn (NED)
