= Kwok Ho Ting =

Hong Kong cyclist (born 1988)

Marco Kwok Ho-Ting 郭灝霆
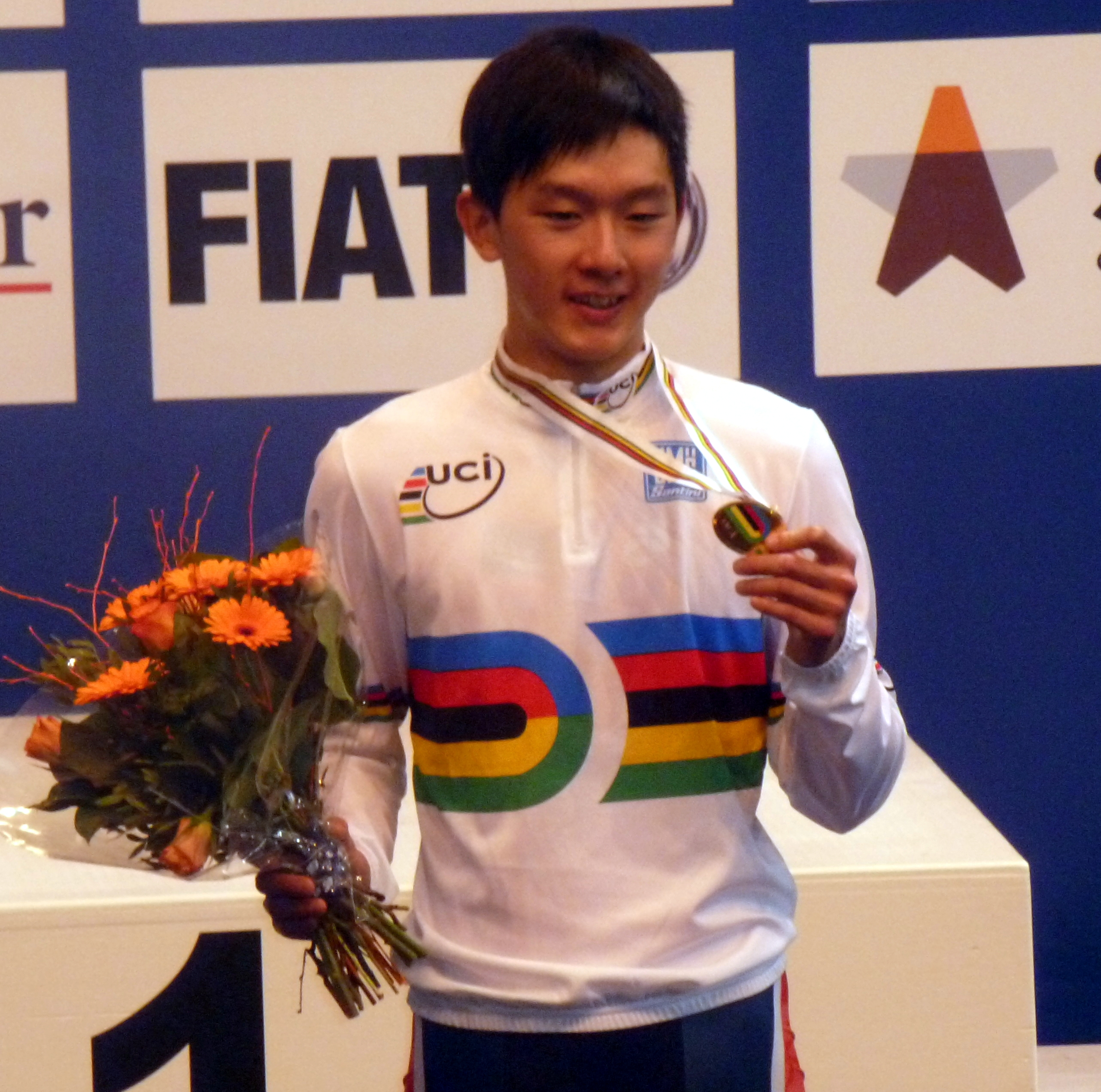
- Kwok in 2011

Personal information
- Full name: Marco Kwok Ho-Ting
- Born: February 26, 1988 (age 38) British Hong Kong
- Height: 1.74 m (5 ft 8 1/2 in)

Cycling career
- Sport: Cycling
- Current team: Retired
- Disciplines: Track; Road
- Role: Rider

Amateur team
- 2000–2006: SCAA Cycling

Professional teams
- 2007: Hong Kong Pro Cycling Team
- 2014: HKSI Pro Cycling Team

Major wins
- Track Scratch, World Championships (2011)
Medal record
Representing Hong Kong
Men's track cycling
World Championships
| Gold medal – first place | 2011 Apeldoorn | Scratch |
Asian Cycling Championships
| Gold medal – first place | 2013 New Delhi | Madison |
| Gold medal – first place | 2011 Nakhon | Madison |
| Gold medal – first place | 2009 Tenggarong | Madison |
| Gold medal – first place | 2009 Tenggarong | Omnium |
| Gold medal – first place | 2008 Nara | Madison |
| Silver medal – second place | 2012 Kuala Lumpur | Team pursuit |
| Silver medal – second place | 2011 Nakhon | Omnium |
| Silver medal – second place | 2011 Nakhon | Team pursuit |
| Bronze medal – third place | 2013 New Delhi | Team pursuit |
| Bronze medal – third place | 2012 Kuala Lumpur | Omnium |
| Bronze medal – third place | 2010 Sharjah | Team pursuit |
| Bronze medal – third place | 2009 Tenggarong | Points Race |
| Bronze medal – third place | 2008 Nara | Omnium |
Asian Games
| Silver medal – second place | 2010 Guangzhou | Team pursuit |

Marco Kwok Ho-Ting (Chinese: 郭灝霆; Jyutping: gwok^{3} hou^{6} ting^{4}; born on 26 February 1988) is a Hong Kong's World Champion cyclist. On 24 March 2011, he stunned a quality field to win the gold medal in the scratch race at the 2011 UCI Track Cycling World Championships in Apeldoorn, the Netherlands. Kwok beat Italy's Elia Viviani to second place, with Morgan Kneisky of France taking third.

Kwok and the Hong Kong famous cyclist Wong Kam-po are the only two Asian elite male cyclists, who have the honour to wear the Rainbow jersey.

"I didn't even prepare specifically for this race. It's so wonderful to win," said Kwok.

Hong Kong's Secretary for Home Affairs, Mr Tsang Tak-sing, extended his congratulations to cyclist Marco Kwok Ho-ting on winning the gold medal.

== Career achievements ==
=== Major results ===
2008
Asian Cycling Championships, Nara

1st Madison
3rd Omnium

2009
1st Stage 5 Tour de Korea
Asian Cycling Championships, Tenggarong

1st Madison
1st Omnium
3rd Points race

2010
UCI Track World Cup Classics, Beijing

1st Madison
2nd Points race

2nd Team pursuit, Asian Games
Asian Cycling Championships, Sharjah

3rd Team pursuit

2011
Scratch, UCI Track World Championships
Asian Cycling Championships, Nakhon

1st Madison
2nd Omnium
2nd Team pursuit

2012
Asian Cycling Championships, Kuala Lumpur

2nd Team pursuit
3rd Omnium

2013
Asian Cycling Championships, New Delhi

1st Madison
3rd Team pursuit

=== Honours and awards ===
- Chief Executive's Commendation for Community Service
- Hong Kong Sports Stars Award

Bank of China (Hong Kong) Best of the Best Hong Kong Sports Stars Award: 2011
Bank of China (Hong Kong) Hong Kong Sports Stars Award: 2011
Bank of China (Hong Kong) Hong Kong Sports Stars Awards for Team Event: 2008
Bank of China (Hong Kong) Hong Kong Sports Stars Awards for Team Event: 2009
Bank of China (Hong Kong) Hong Kong Potential Sports Stars Awards: 2007

== See also ==
- Wong Kam-po
