= Josiah Ng =

Malaysian cyclist

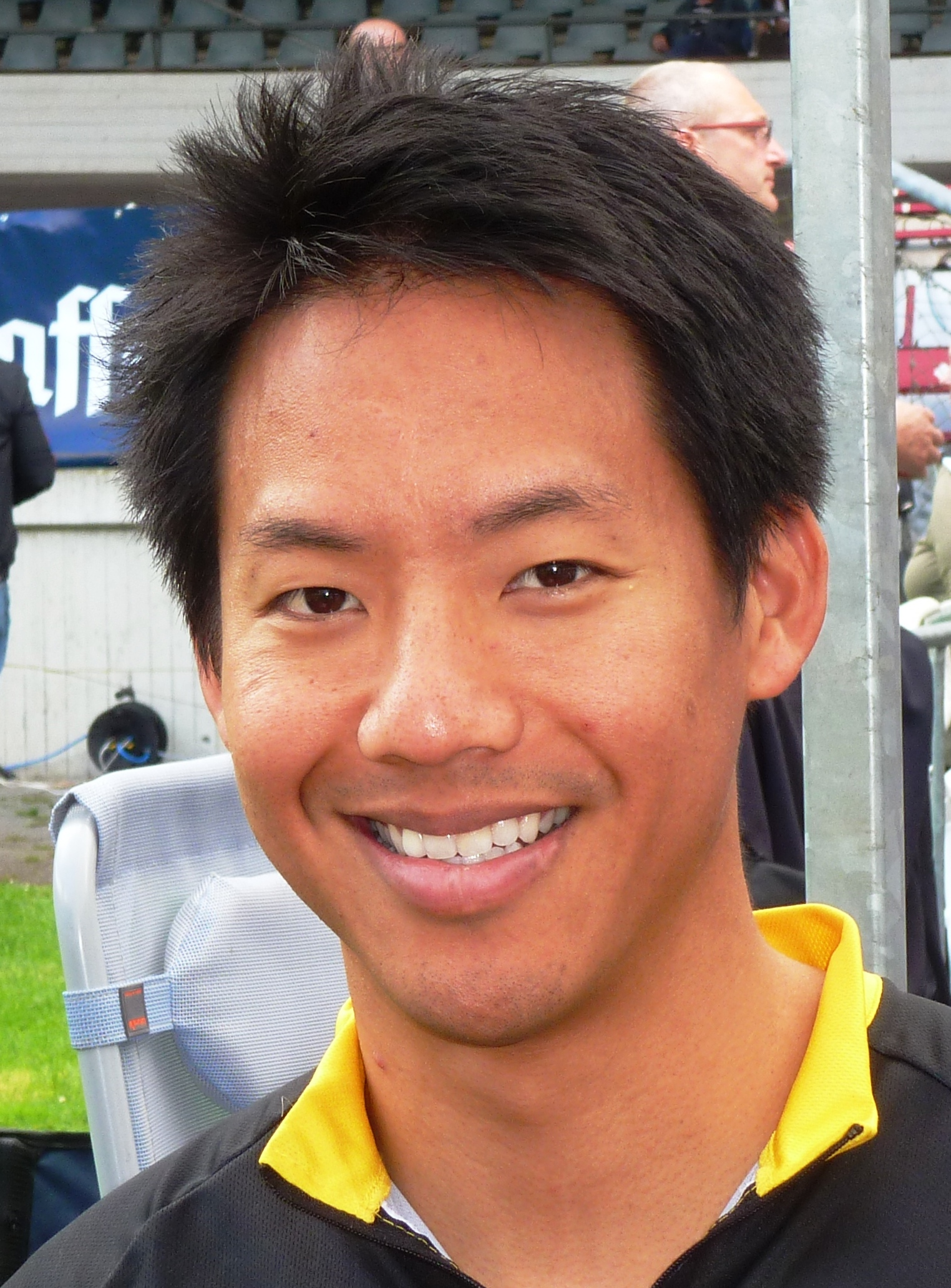
- Ng in 2012

Personal information
- Full name: Josiah Ng Onn Lam
- Born: 2 February 1980 (age 46) Manila, Philippines

Cycling career
- Sport: Cycling
- Current team: Malaysia
- Discipline: Track
Medal record
Men's track cycling
Representing Malaysia
Asian Games
Silver medal – second place	2010 Guangzhou	Keirin
Silver medal – second place	2006 Doha	Keirin
Silver medal – second place	2002 Busan	Sprint
Bronze medal – third place	2014 Incheon	Keirin
Asian Championships
Gold medal – first place	2013 New Delhi	Sprint
Gold medal – first place	2013 New Delhi	Keirin
Gold medal – first place	2012 Kuala Lumpur	Keirin
Silver medal – second place	2011 Nakhon Ratchasima	Keirin
Bronze medal – third place	2007 Bangkok	Sprint
Commonwealth Games
Gold medal – first place	2010 Delhi	Keirin
Bronze medal – third place	2010 Delhi	Team sprint
Southeast Asian Games
Gold medal – first place	2007 Nakhon Ratchasima	Sprint
Gold medal – first place	2007 Nakhon Ratchasima	Team sprint

Josiah Ng Onn Lam (simplified Chinese: 伍安临; traditional Chinese: 伍安臨; pinyin: Wǔ Ānlín, born 2 February 1980) is a retired Malaysian professional track cyclist.

Josiah was the first Malaysian to make it into the cycling Olympic finals. He represented Malaysia at Athens 2004, Beijing 2008 and London 2012. In 2004 he was awarded the Malaysian Olympian and Sportsman of the Year after being the 1st Malaysian cyclist to make a final in cycling at the 2004 Athens Olympics. In Josiah won gold at the 2010 Commonwealth Games, in Keirin at age 30.

He is known to have put Malaysia on the map as one of the best countries for developing world-class track cyclists.

In 2008, he became the first non-Australian to win the 72nd Melbourne Cup on Wheels at the Melbourne Arena.

== Early life ==
Josiah had loved cycling since the young age of five years old, as it represented freedom for him.

At age 14, he eventually realised his dreams and bought a used racing bike for US$250. He entered his first criterium racing at age 15. Josiah comes from a very traditional Chinese family and didn't get the support of his parents in his chosen career path. He would often sneak out of the house when they had gone to sleep to walk to where his bike was stored 4 km away. At age 18, his father asked him to leave home and wished him luck with his endeavours. He survived by taking on odd jobs where he could, including teaching violin.

== Cycling career ==
In 2002, Josiah applied for an IOC scholarship to train at the World Cycling Centre in Switzerland under world-renowned coach, Fred Magne.

In 2008, he became the first non-Australian to win the Melbourne Cup on Wheels at the Melbourne Arena. Ng took the lead with two laps to go in the eight-lap event, clutching his win Australia's dual Olympic gold medallist Graeme Brown, who finished second in the 2000m handicap event.

After his cycling career, in February 2016, Josiah endorsed Malaysian fitness app ‘Fitness In My Pocket.’

Following a social media uproar about a RM10 mock cheque prize for a local Malaysian cycling event for children, Josiah chimed in about his entire journey that there is more to cycling competitively than winning prize money.

=== Retirement ===
In 2015 Josiah retired from competition at age 35 announcing at the 2014 UCI Track Cycling Asian Championships in Korat, Thailand that the 2015 World Championships would be his last outing in the sport.

Josiah's last race was at the World Track Cycling Championships in Paris in February 2015.

=== Accidents ===
Four months before he was due to compete at the Athens Olympics 2004, Josiah endured a crash in which he broke his wrist, teeth, nose and lost a lot of blood. He was in the intensive care unit for several days.

On 30 March 2007, Josiah broke his collarbone in a nasty crash in the first round of the Keirin event at the World Track Cycling Championships in Mallorca Spain. He was stretchered off the piste and taken to the hospital immediately and was ruled out of the competition after Italian Roberto Chiappa cut into his path and knocked him down.

During the UCI Track Cycling World Cup in Mexico Dec 2013 Josiah endured another severe crash in which suffered a punctured lung (Pneumothorax), broken collarbone (same one in Mallorca, Spain April 2007 during the World Championships), 2 broken ribs and a concussion.

== Achievements ==
2002
Asian Games (Busan, South Korea) – Silver Medallist
2004
Olympic Games – 5th in Keirin
2005
Japan International Keirin Invitational - Three 1st place wins
Nestors Keirin Cup (Penn State, USA) – 1st
Festival of Speed Sprint Tournament (Penn State, USA)- 1st
International Fastest Man on Wheels, (Penn State, USA) – 2nd
2006
UCI World Cup, Manchester, UK, – Bronze Medallist
UCI World Cup, Los Angeles, USA, – 5th
UCI World Cup, Sydney, Australia, – 2nd
Crowned UCI World Cup Champion in Sydney, Australia on 3 March
Asian Games (Doha, Qatar) – 2nd in Keirin
2007
Sid Patterson GP in Melbourne, Australia on – 1 February in Sprints; 3rd in Keirin
International Fastest Man on Wheels, (Penn State, USA), – 3 June
San Jose American Velodrome Challenge (AVC), – 1 July in Keirin, Team Sprint and Sprint.
2009
UCI World Cup, Melbourne, Australia, – Bronze in Keirin
Revolution 5th Austral Wheelrace, 16 December, Melbourne Arena, Melbourne, Australia, Track – 1st Sprint; 2nd Keirin
2010
Revolution 6th Austral Wheelrace, 27 February, Darebin International Centre, Melbourne, Australia, Track – 2nd Sprint
Commonwealth Games, 6 October, New Delhi – 1st Keirin
2010 Asian Games, 17 November, Guangzhou – 2nd Keirin
2011
Sydney International Sprint Grand Prix -1st Keirin
Asian Cycling Championships - 2nd Keirin
2012
Asian Cycling Championships - 1st Keirin
Cologne International Sprint Grand Prix -1st Keirin
Tasmanian Christmas Carnival - 1st Latrobe 2000m Handicap
2013
Asian Cycling Championships - 1st Keirin
Asian Cycling Championships - 1st Sprints
World Championships - 12th Keirin
Wangaretta Cycling Carnival - 1st 1000m Handicap

== Awards ==
- 2004 Malaysian Olympian of the Year
- 2004 Malaysian Sportsman of the Year
- UCI Track World Cup Ranking
- Keirin Year 2002 to 2003 – Ranked No.1
- Keirin Year 2004 to 2005 – Ranked No. 3
- Keirin Year 2005 – 2006 – Ranked No.1
- 9 times World Cup Medalist
- Nominee of "Most Outstanding Youth of the Year 2007" AYA Awards

== Sponsors ==
Josiah's sponsors were National Sports Council of Malaysia, 5bling.com, Nike, Euro-Asia Imports, Oakley and RBC Sport.

In 2006, Josiah signed a sponsorship deal with FedEx Express. In 2008, after much exposure from the FedEx sponsorship, Josiah was approached by Nike and was subsequently featured on the Damansara Heights billboard for a month during Beijing Olympics 2008. In that same year also, Josiah was featured in a media advertorial that saw him endorsing the advantages of using Nivea for men.
