= Cheung King Wai =

Hong Kong racing cyclist

Personal information
- Full name: Cheung King Wai
- Born: September 3, 1985 (age 41)

Cycling career
- Sport: Cycling
- Current team: HKSI Pro Cycling Team
- Disciplines: Road; Track
- Role: Rider (retired); Directeur sportif
- Rider type: Endurance

Amateur team
- 2008–2013: HSBC Hong Kong Team

Professional teams
- 2005–2006: Purapharm
- 2007: Hong Kong Pro Cycling
- 2014–2016: HKSI Pro Cycling Team

Managerial team
- 2017–: HKSI Pro Cycling Team
Medal record
Representing Hong Kong
Men's track cycling
Asian Games
Gold medal – first place	2006 Doha	Points race
Silver medal – second place	2010 Guangzhou	Team pursuit
Asian Championships
Silver medal – second place	2011 Nakhon Ratchasima	Team pursuit
Silver medal – second place	2012 Kuala Lumpur	Team pursuit
Silver medal – second place	2014 Astana	Team pursuit
Bronze medal – third place	2006 Kuala Lumpur	Points race

Cheung King Wai MH (traditional Chinese: 張敬煒; simplified Chinese: 张敬炜; Jyutping: zoeng^{1} ging^{3} wai^{5}; born 3 September 1985) is a Hong Kong former professional racing cyclist, who won a gold medal at the 2006 Asian Games in the points race. Cheung currently works as a directeur sportif for UCI Continental team.

His younger brother, Cheung King Lok is also a famous professional cyclist in Asia.

== Major results ==
2006
1st Points race, Asian Games
1st Road race, Chinese National Road Championships
3rd Points race, Asian Track Championships
2008
8th Overall Tour of Hong Kong Shanghai

1st Stage 4

2010
2nd Team pursuit, Asian Games
5th Overall Tour de Taiwan
2011
1st Team pursuit, Chinese National Track Championships
2nd Team pursuit, Asian Track Championships
2012
2nd Team pursuit, Asian Track Championships
2nd Road race, Hong Kong National Road Championships
2013
Hong Kong National Track Championships

1st Kilo
1st Keirin
1st Team pursuit

1st Road race, Hong Kong National Road Championships
3rd Tour de Okinawa
2014
1st Team pursuit, Hong Kong National Track Championships
2nd Team pursuit, Asian Team Pursuit Championships
Hong Kong National Road Championships

2nd Time trial
3rd Road race
