= Chanpeng Nontasin =

Thai road and track cyclist

Personal information
- Full name: Chanpeng Nontasin; Thai: จันทร์เพ็ง นนทะสิน
- Born: 9 October 1984 (age 42)
- Height: 1.65 m (5 ft 5 in)
- Weight: 58 kg (128 lb)

Cycling career
- Sport: Cycling
- Current team: Thailand Women's Cycling Team
- Disciplines: Road; Track
- Role: Rider

Professional team
- 2017–: Thailand Women's Cycling Team
Medal record
Representing Thailand
Southeast Asian Games
Women's road cycling
Gold medal – first place	2011 Palembang	Time trial
Silver medal – second place	2005 Manila	Road race
Silver medal – second place	2007 Nakhon Ratchasima	Time trial
Silver medal – second place	2009 Vientiane	Time trial
Silver medal – second place	2011 Palembang	Road race
Silver medal – second place	2013 Naypyidaw	Time trial
Silver medal – second place	2015 Singapore	Time trial
Women's track cycling
Gold medal – first place	2007 Nakhon Ratchasima	Individual pursuit
Asian Games
Women's road cycling
Bronze medal – third place	2010 Guangzhou	Time trial
Women's track cycling
Bronze medal – third place	2006 Doha	Points race
Bronze medal – third place	2010 Guangzhou	Points race

Chanpeng Nontasin (Thai: จันทร์เพ็ง นนทะสิน; born 9 October 1984) is a Thai road and track cyclist, who currently rides for UCI Women's Continental Team Thailand Women's Cycling Team. Nontasin specialises in the individual time trial and points race disciplines of the sport.

Nontasin represented Thailand at the 2008 Summer Olympics in Beijing, where she competed in the women's road race. She completed the run in sixty-first place by twenty seconds ahead of Mauritius' Aurelie Halbwachs, with a time of 3:51:51.

== Major results ==
=== Track ===
2004
1st Points race, Asian Track Championships
2006
3rd Points race, Asian Games
2007
1st Individual pursuit, Southeast Asian Games
2008
2nd Points race, Asian Track Championships
2009
Asian Track Championships

2nd Points race
2nd Team pursuit
3rd Individual pursuit

2010
3rd Points race, Asian Games
3rd Individual pursuit, Asian Track Championships
2011
2nd Individual pursuit, Asian Track Championships
2013
3rd Points race, ACC Track Asia Cup – Thailand Round
2014
2nd Points race, Asian Track Championships
3rd Individual pursuit, Track Clubs ACC Cup

=== Road ===
2004
Asian Road Championships

2nd Road race
4th Time trial

2005
2nd Road race, Southeast Asian Games
2007
2nd Time trial, Southeast Asian Games
4th Time trial, Asian Road Championships
2008
2nd Time trial, Asian Road Championships
4th Overall Tour of Chongming Island
2009
Asian Road Championships

2nd Time trial
4th Road race

2nd Time trial, Southeast Asian Games
2010
2nd Road race, Thailand National Games
3rd Time trial, Asian Games
2011
Southeast Asian Games

1st Time trial
2nd Road race

1st Time trial, Asian Road Championships
2012
4th Time trial, Asian Road Championships
2013
Southeast Asian Games

2nd Time trial
9th Road race

6th Time trial, Asian Road Championships
2014
8th Time trial, Asian Road Championships
2015
Southeast Asian Games

2nd Time trial
9th Road race

6th Time trial, Asian Road Championships
2019
8th Time trial, Southeast Asian Games
2020
National Road Championships

2nd Time trial
2nd Road race

8th Overall Tour of Thailand
2021
3rd Road race, National Road Championships
6th Overall Tour of Thailand
2022
7th Overall Princess Maha Chakri Sirindhon's Cup Tour of Thailand
