= Na Ah-reum =

South Korean racing cyclist

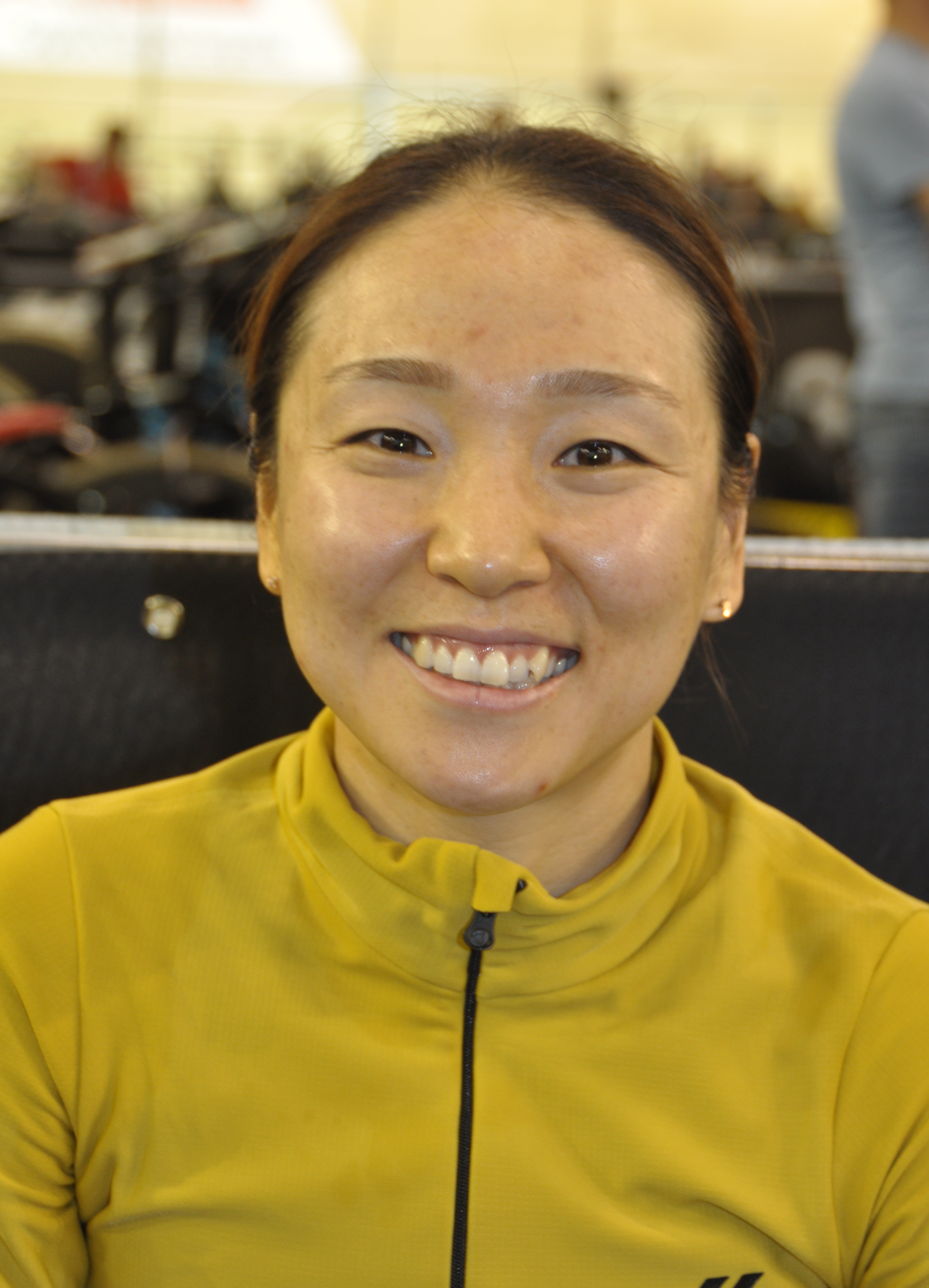
- Na Ah-reum in 2018

Personal information
- Born: 24 March 1990 (age 36) North Jeolla Province, South Korea

Korean name
- Hangul: 나아름
- Hanja: 羅雅凜
- RR: Na Areum
- MR: Na Arŭm

Sport
- Cycling career
- Sport: Cycling
- Disciplines: Road; Track
- Role: Rider

Professional team
- 2019: Alé–Cipollini
Medal record
Representing South Korea
Women's road bicycle racing
Asian Games
Gold medal – first place	2014 Incheon	Time trial
Gold medal – first place	2018 Jakarta-Palembang	Road race
Gold medal – first place	2018 Jakarta-Palembang	Time trial
Silver medal – second place	2022 Hangzhou	Road race
Asian Championships
Gold medal – first place	2008 Nara	Junior road race
Gold medal – first place	2008 Nara	Junior time trial
Gold medal – first place	2012 Kuala Lumpur	Time trial
Gold medal – first place	2014 Astana	Time trial
Gold medal – first place	2015 Nakhon Ratchasima	Time trial
Gold medal – first place	2016 Izu	Road race
Silver medal – second place	2017 Manama	Road race
Silver medal – second place	2019 Tashkent	Road race
Women's track cycling
Asian Games
Gold medal – first place	2018 Jakarta-Palembang	Madison
Gold medal – first place	2018 Jakarta-Palembang	Team pursuit
Silver medal – second place	2014 Incheon	Team pursuit
Bronze medal – third place	2014 Incheon	Omnium
Bronze medal – third place	2022 Hangzhou	Madison
Asian Championships
Gold medal – first place	2010 Sharjah	Omnium
Gold medal – first place	2011 Nakhon Ratchasima	Points race
Gold medal – first place	2019 Jakarta	Team pursuit
Gold medal – first place	2020 Jincheon	Team pursuit
Gold medal – first place	2022 New Delhi	Team pursuit
Silver medal – second place	2010 Sharjah	Individual pursuit
Silver medal – second place	2010 Sharjah	Team pursuit
Silver medal – second place	2011 Nakhon Ratchasima	Team pursuit
Silver medal – second place	2014 Astana	Team pursuit
Silver medal – second place	2019 Jakarta	Madison
Silver medal – second place	2020 Jincheon	Points race
Silver medal – second place	2022 New Delhi	Madison
Silver medal – second place	2023 Nilai	Madison
Bronze medal – third place	2014 Astana	Individual pursuit
Bronze medal – third place	2020 Jincheon	Madison
Bronze medal – third place	2023 Nilai	Team pursuit

Na Ah-reum (Korean: 나아름, born 24 March 1990) is a South Korean track and road bicycle racer, born in Naju, who last rode for UCI Women's Team Alé–Cipollini. She competed at the 2012 Summer Olympics in the Women's road race, finishing 13th place. She also competed in the road race at the 2016 Olympics. In 2018 Na won the South Korea National Championships road race and individual time trial.

== Major results ==
=== Road ===
2008
Asian Junior Road Championships

1st Time trial
1st Road race

2012
1st Time trial, Asian Road Championships
2nd Tour of Zhoushan Island II
3rd Road race, National Road Championships
5th Overall Tour of Zhoushan Island I
2013
1st Road race, National Road Championships
2014
1st Time trial, Asian Games
Asian Road Championships

1st Time trial
9th Road race

1st Road race, National Road Championships
2015
Asian Road Championships

1st Time trial
7th Road race

2016
1st Road race, Asian Road Championships
8th SwissEver GP Cham-Hagendorn
2017
National Road Championships

1st Road race
2nd Time trial

2nd Road race, Asian Road Championships
2018
Asian Games

1st Road race
1st Time trial

National Road Championships

1st Road race
1st Time trial

2019
Asian Road Championships

1st Team time trial
2nd Road race

7th Donostia San Sebastian Klasikoa
2020
National Road Championships

1st Road race
3rd Time trial

=== Track ===
2010
Asian Track Championships

1st Omnium
2nd Individual pursuit
2nd Team pursuit

2011
Asian Track Championships

1st Points race
2nd Team pursuit

2014
Asian Games

2nd Team pursuit (with Lee Chaek-Yung, Lee Ju-mi, Lee Min-hye, Son Hee-jung, and Kim You-ri)
3rd Omnium

Asian Track Championships

2nd Team pursuit (with Lee Ju-mi, Lee Min-hye, and Kim You-ri)
3rd Individual pursuit

2016
GP Velodromes Romands

1st Points race
1st Scratch

2018
Asian Games

1st Madison
1st Team pursuit

2019
Asian Track Championships

1st Team pursuit
2nd Madison
