= Wu Chaomei =

Chinese cyclist (born 1989)

Personal information
- Born: 11 August 1989 (age 37)

Cycling career
- Sport: Cycling
- Discipline: Track cycling
- Role: Rider
- Rider type: endurance

Professional team
- 2012: China Chongming–Giant Pro Cycling

Wu Chaomei (born 11 August 1989) is a Chinese female track cyclist. She competed on the national team in the omnium event at the 2010 UCI Track Cycling World Championships. He was the Individual Pursuit gold medalist at the 2009 Asian Cycling Championships, as well as being a member of the Chinese team pursuit team that brought her a second gold medal.

== Major results ==
2009
1st Asian Track Cycling Championships (Individual Pursuit)

2010
3rd Asian Track Cycling Championships (Individual Pursuit)

2011
3rd Asian Track Cycling Championships (Individual Pursuit)

2015
3rd National Track Championships (Omnium)
