= Tang Qi =

Chinese cyclist

Personal information
- Born: 20 October 1986 (age 39)

Cycling career
- Sport: Cycling
- Discipline: Track cycling
- Role: Rider
- Rider type: sprinter

Tang Qi (born 20 October 1986) is a Chinese male track cyclist. He competed at the 2007, 2011 and 2012 UCI Track Cycling World Championships.
