= Li Yan (cyclist) =

Chinese cyclist

Personal information
- Full name: Li Yan
- Born: July 17, 1978 (age 48) China

Cycling career
- Sport: Cycling
- Discipline: Track
- Role: Rider
- Rider type: Points race

Professional team
- 2007: Giant Pro Cycling

Li Yan (born July 17, 1978) is a Chinese professional racing cyclist.

== Career highlights ==
2005
2005–2006 World Cup

2nd, Points race, Manchester

2006
2005–2006 World Cup

3rd, Points race, Los Angeles

2006–2007 World Cup

3rd, Points race, Sydney

Asian Games, Doha

1st, Points race

2007
2007–2008 World Cup

2nd, Points race, Sydney

2008
2007–2008 World Cup

3rd, Points race, Los Angeles
