= Cheng Changsong =

Chinese cyclist

Cheng Changsong is a male Chinese racing cyclist.

== See also ==
- China at the 2012 Summer Olympics - Cycling
- Cycling at the 2012 Summer Olympics – Men's team sprint
