= Zhang Miao (cyclist) =

Chinese cyclist

Personal information
- Full name: Zhang Miao
- Born: 12 August 1988 (age 38) Binzhou, China
- Height: 1.83 m (6 ft 0 in)
- Weight: 80 kg (176 lb)

Cycling career
- Sport: Cycling
- Discipline: Track
- Role: Rider
- Rider type: Sprinter
Medal record
Men's track cycling
Representing China
Asian Championships
Silver medal – second place	2020 Jincheon	Team sprint

Zhang Miao (born 12 August 1988) is a Chinese cyclist. He competed in keirin and the men's individual and team sprint at the 2012 Summer Olympics in London.
