= Park Seon-ho =

South Korean cyclist (born 1984)

Personal information
- Full name: Jang Sun-jae; Korean: 박선호
- Born: 15 March 1984 (age 42) Seoul, South Korea

Cycling career
- Sport: Cycling
- Discipline: Road
- Role: Rider (retired)

Professional teams
- 2008–2011: Seoul Cycling Team
- 2012: Gebrüder Weiss–Oberndorfer
Medal record
Men's track cycling
Representing South Korea
Asian Championships
Gold medal – first place	2010 Guangzhou	team pursuit

Park Seon-Ho (born 15 March 1984) is a South Korean track cyclist. At the 2012 Summer Olympics, he competed in the Men's team pursuit for the national team.
