= Japan at the 2006 Asian Games =

- IOC code: JPN
- NOC: Japanese Olympic Committee

in Doha
- Flag bearer: Saori Yoshida
- Medals Ranked 3rd: Gold 50 Silver 71 Bronze 77 Total 198

Asian Games appearances (overview)
- 1951; 1954; 1958; 1962; 1966; 1970; 1974; 1978; 1982; 1986; 1990; 1994; 1998; 2002; 2006; 2010; 2014; 2018; 2022; 2026

Japan participated in the 2006 Asian Games held in Doha, Qatar from December 1, 2006 to December 15, 2006.

== Medalists ==
This country garnered a total of 198 medals of which 50 are gold.

=== Gold medalists ===
- Shingo Suetsugu – Athletics (Men's 200m)
- Daichi Sawano – Athletics (Men's Pole Vault)
- Kenji Narisako – Athletics (Men's 400 m Hurdles)
- Kumiko Ikeda – Athletics (Women's Long Jump)
- Kayoko Fukushi – Athletics (Women's 10,000m)
- Masaru Ito – Bowling (Men's Five Player Teams)
- Yoshinao Masatoki
- Tomoyuki Sasaki
- Toshihiko Takahashi
- Masaaki Takemoto
- Tomokatsu Yamashita
- Mayuko Hagiwara – Cycling (Women's Road Race)
- Ryuji Umeda – Cue Sports (Men's Carom Cushion 3 Singles)
- Satoshi Kawabata – Cue sports (Men's 8-Ball Pool Singles)
- Tsubasa Kitatsuru – Cycling (Men's Sprint)
- Kazuya Narita – Cycling (Men's Team Sprint)
- Yudai Nitta
- Kazunari Watanabe
- Yoshiaki Oiwa – Equestrian (Eventing-Individual)
- Yuki Ota – Fencing (Men's Individual Foil)
- Hiroyuki Tomita – Artistic Gymnastics (Men's Pommel Horse)
- Hisashi Mizutori – Gymnastics (Men's Horizontal Bar)
- Tatsuaki Egusa Judo (Men's – 60 kg)
- Yasuyuki Muneta Judo (Men's +100 kg)
- Masae Ueno Judo (Women's – 70 kg)
- Sae Nakazawa – Judo (Women's – 78 kg)
- Tetsuya Furukawa – Karate (Men's Individual Kata)
- Tomoko Araga – Karate (Women's Individual Kumite – 53 kg)
- Yuka Sato – Karate (Women's Individual Kumite – 60 kg)
- Nao Morooka – Karate (Women's Individual Kata)
- Yuya Higashiyama – Rowing (Men's Four)
- Yu Kataoka
- Rokuroh Okumura
- Yoshinori Sato
- Hideki Omoto – Rowing (Men's Double Sculls)
- Takahiro Suda
- Masahiro Tsuiki – Rugby (Men's 7 a side)
- Eiji Yamamoto
- Yusuke Kobuki
- Akihito Yamada
- Takashi Sato
- Takeshi Fujiwara
- Yohei Shinomiya
- Takashi Suzuki
- Yuki Okuzono
- Hiroki Yamazaki
- Hiroki Yoshida
- Yusaku Kuwazuru
- Ai Kondo – Sailing (470 Women)
- Naoko Kamata
- Yukiko Ueno – Softball (Women)
- Yuko Endo
- Mariko Masubuchi
- Yuka Suzuki
- Emi Naito
- Aki Uenishi
- Eri Yamada
- Satoko Mabuchi
- Ayumi Karino
- Masumi Mishina
- Megu Hirose
- Rei Nishiyama
- Sachiko Ito
- Emi Inui
- Mariko Goto
- Shigeo Nakahori
- Hidenori Shinohara – Soft Tennis (Men's Team)
- Naoya Hanada
- Tatsuro Kawamura
- Tsuneo Takagawa
