= Jang Sun-jae =

South Korean cyclist (born 1984)

Personal information
- Full name: Jang Sun-jae; Korean: 장선재
- Born: 14 December 1984 (age 41) South Korea

Cycling career
- Sport: Cycling
- Current team: LX Cycling Team
- Discipline: Road
- Role: Rider (retired); Directeur sportif

Professional teams
- 2012–2015: RTS Racing Team
- 2016: LX–IIBS Cycling Team

Managerial team
- 2017–: LX Cycling Team
Medal record
Men's track cycling
Representing South Korea
Asian Championships
| Gold medal – first place | 2010 Guangzhou | team pursuit |

Jang Sun-Jae (Korean: 장선재; born 14 December 1984) is a South Korean former professional cyclist, who currently works as a directeur sportif for UCI Continental team LX Cycling Team. At the 2012 Summer Olympics, he competed in the Men's team pursuit for the national team.

== Major results ==
2011
1st Stage 3 Tour of China
2013
5th Time trial, Asian Road Championships
2014
2nd Road race, National Road Championships
