= Kazuhiro Mori (cyclist) =

Japanese bicycle racer

Personal information
- Born: September 17, 1982 (age 44) Chiba, Japan

Cycling career
- Sport: Cycling
- Current team: Retired
- Discipline: Road
- Role: Rider

Professional team
- 2006–2014: Aisan Racing Team
Medal record
Men's track cycling
Representing Japan
World Championships
Bronze medal – third place	2010 Ballerup	Scratch race

Kazuhiro Mori (盛 一大, Mori Kazuhiro; born September 17, 1982 in Chiba Prefecture) is a retired Japanese cyclist.

== Major results ==
2005
1st Prologue Tour de Hokkaido
2006
1st Prologue Tour de Hokkaido
3rd Team time trial, Asian Games
2008
Tour de Hokkaido

1st Stages 2 & 3

2009
1st Team time trial, East Asian Games (with Makoto Iijima, Kazuo Inoue and Hayato Yoshida)
1st Time trial, National Road Championships
3rd Overall Tour de Hokkaido

1st Stage 2

2010
1st Tour of South China Sea
2011
1st Tour de Okinawa
