= Monrudee Chapookam =

Thai cyclist (born 1982)

Personal information
- Born: 15 October 1982 (age 44) Thailand

Cycling career
- Sport: Cycling
- Discipline: Road cycling
Medal record
Representing Thailand
Southeast Asian Games
Women's road cycling
| Gold medal – first place | 2009 Vientiane | Time trial |
| Gold medal – first place | 2007 Nakhon Ratchasima | Time trial |
| Bronze medal – third place | 2005 Manila | Road race |
Women's track cycling
| Silver medal – second place | 2007 Nakhon Ratchasima | Points race |

Monrudee Chapookham (born 15 October 1982) is a road cyclist from Thailand. She participated at the 2007 UCI Road World Championships, 2009 UCI Road World Championships, 2010 UCI Road World Championships and 2011 UCI Road World Championships.
