= Jiang Fan (cyclist) =

Chinese track cyclist (born 1990)

Jiang Fan (18 March 1990, in Binzhou) is a Chinese track cyclist. At the 2012 Summer Olympics, she competed in the Women's team pursuit for the Chinese national team.

== Achievements ==
- (silver) 2011-2012 Track Cycling World Cup in Astana - Team pursuit
