= Zhang Lei (cyclist) =

Chinese cyclist

Personal information
- Full name: Zhang Lei
- Born: April 4, 1981 (age 45) Shandong, China
- Height: 1.77 m (5 ft 10 in)
- Weight: 88 kg (194 lb)

Cycling career
- Sport: Cycling
- Discipline: Track
- Role: Rider
- Rider type: Sprinter
Medal record
Representing China
Men's track cycling
Asian Games
| Gold medal – first place | 2010 Guangzhou | Sprint |
| Gold medal – first place | 2010 Guangzhou | Team sprint |

Zhang Lei (born April 4, 1981 in Shandong) is a male Chinese racing cyclist, who has twice competed for China at the Olympic Games.

== Sports career ==
- 1999 Shandong Provincial Cycling Team;
- 2005 National Team

== Major performances ==
- 2001 National Games - 2nd team sprint;
- 2002 National Championships - 1st sprint;
- 2006 Asian Games - 2nd team sprint;
- 2007 Asian Championships - 1st team sprint;
- 2008 World Championships - 7th team sprint;
- 2010 World Cup Classic, Beijing, China - 1st team sprint (5th overall World Cup rank at end of series);
- 2010 World Championships, Ballerup, Denmark - 4th team sprint;
- 2010 Asian Games, Guangzhou, China - 1st team sprint, 1st individual sprint

== Records ==
- 2002 Moscow - 11th sprint (NR)
