= Jamie Wong (cyclist) =

Hong Kong cyclist (born 1986)

Wong Wan-Yiu
Personal information
- Full name: Wong Wan-Yiu, Jamie
- Born: 4 November 1986 (age 39) Hong Kong
- Height: 164 cm (5 ft 5 in)
- Weight: 54 kg (119 lb)

Cycling career
- Sport: Cycling
- Disciplines: Track, road
- Role: Rider
Medal record
Representing Hong Kong
Women's Track cycling
Asian Games
Silver medal – second place	2010 Guangzhou	Points Race
Asian Cycling Championships
Gold medal – first place	2012 Kuala Lumpur	Points Race
Gold medal – first place	2013 New Delhi	Points Race
Silver medal – second place	2007 Nakhon Ratchasima	Points Race
Silver medal – second place	2009 Tenggarong	Scratch
Silver medal – second place	2010 Sharjah	Points race
Silver medal – second place	2011 Nakhon Ratchasima	Scratch
Silver medal – second place	2012 Kuala Lumpur	Individual pursuit
Bronze medal – third place	2006 Kuala Lumpur	Points Race
Bronze medal – third place	2011 Nakhon Ratchasima	Points Race
Bronze medal – third place	2011 Nakhon Ratchasima	Team pursuit
Women's Road cycling
Bronze medal – third place	2011 Nakhon Ratchasima	Individual time trial
Bronze medal – third place	2013 New Delhi	Individual time trial

Jamie Wong Wan-Yiu (Chinese: 黃蘊瑤; pinyin: Wáng Yùnyáo; Jyutping: wong^{4} wan^{3} jiu^{4}; born 4 November 1986) is a Hong Kong cyclist.

She was second in the Asian Cycling Championships in 2007 in Thailand. A year later she won the points race at the 2007–08 Track Cycling World Cup in Copenhagen.

== 2010 Asian Games ==
At the 2010 Asian Games, she won the silver medal in the points race in the cycling competition in dramatic fashion, after taking a fall early in the race and fracturing a rib. Wong had to be helped up to the podium to collect her medal and sobbed uncontrollably as she shakily stood for the national anthem, clutching her arm and her knees clearly badly bruised and grazed. Wong was taken from the velodrome in a wheelchair. Her coach Shen Jia-Kang said it was a miracle that she finished the race. The day after winning the silver medal, Wong said: "I learnt to be brave from my tough mother. She worked hard and saved money to buy me a bike after learning I was interested in cycling."

After claiming her silver medal, Hong Kong's Chief Executive Donald Tsang and Secretary for Home Affairs Tsang Tak-sing wished her and her teammate Diao Xiaojuan a speedy recovery from their injuries.

== 2012 London Olympics ==
Jamie Wong competed in the Women's road race at the 2012 London Olympics alongside 65 other riders, and finished the 140-kilometre course in nearly 3 hours and 57 minutes under adverse weather conditions. She came last out of the 59 riders who finished the race, was some 21 minutes behind Dutch winner Marianne Vos. Wong said she was disappointed she couldn't keep up with the main pack.

=== 2013 Asian Cycling Championship ===
In March 2013, Jamie Wong successfully defended her title when she won the 20 km points race in the 2013 Asian Cycling Championships at New Delhi, by scoring 41 marks after 80 rounds, beating her Japanese and Malaysian rivals.

== Personal life ==
Jamie's father is Wong Man-shing. Jamie was five years old when her parents divorced.

== Major results ==
2008
1st Points Race, Launceston Carnival
3rd Points Race, International Track Challenge Vienna
2013
ACC Track Asia Cup – Thailand Round

1st Individual Pursuit
1st Points Race

2014
Hong Kong International Track Cup

1st Individual Pursuit
1st Points Race
1st Team Pursuit (with Meng Zhaojuan, Pang Yao and Yang Qianyu)

Track Asia Cup

1st Individual Pursuit
1st Points Race

3rd Team Pursuit, Asian Track Championships (with Pang Yao, Meng Zhaojuan and Yang Qianyu)
