= Asian Junior Cycling Championships =

Annual continental cycling championships

The Asian Junior Cycling Championships are annual continental cycling championships for road bicycle racing and track cycling since unknown years, exclusively for Asian junior cyclists selected by the national governing body (member nations of the Asian Cycling Confederation).

== Competitions ==
| Edition | Year | Country | City | Velodrome |
|---|---|---|---|---|
| I | 1989 | India | New Delhi | |
| II | 1991 | China | Beijing | |
| III | 1993 | Malaysia | Ipoh | |
| IV | 1995 | Philippines | Quezon City | Amoranto Velodrome |
| V | 1997 | Iran; South Korea | Tehran; Seoul | |
| VI | 1999 | Japan | Maebashi | Green Dome Maebashi |
| VII | 2000 | China | Shanghai | |
| VIII | 2001 | Chinese Taipei | Kaohsiung; Taichung | |
| IX | 2002 | Thailand | Bangkok | |
| X | 2003 | South Korea | Changwon | Changwon Velodrome |
| XI | 2004 | Japan | Yokkaichi | Yokkaichi Keirin Velodrome |
| XII | 2005 | India | Ludhiana | Punjab Agricultural University's Velodrome |
| XIII | 2006 | Malaysia | Kuala Lumpur | Kuala Lumpur City Hall Velodrome |
| XIV | 2007 | Thailand | Bangkok | Huamark Velodrome |
| XV | 2008 | Japan | Nara | Nara Keirin Velodrome |
| XVI | 2009 | Indonesia | Tenggarong | Tenggarong Velodrome |
| XVII | 2010 | United Arab Emirates | Sharjah | Zayed Velodrome |
| XVIII | 2011 | Thailand | Nakhon Ratchasima | King’s 80th Birthday Anniversary Velodrome |
| XIX | 2012 | Malaysia | Kuala Lumpur | Cheras Velodrome |
| XX | 2013 | India | New Delhi | Indira Gandhi Velodrome |
| XXI | 2014 | Kazakhstan | Astana | Saryarka Velodrome |
| XXII | 2015 | Thailand | Nakhon Ratchasima | King’s 80th Birthday Anniversary Velodrome |
| XXIII | 2016 | Japan | Izu | Izu Velodrome |

== Men's road events ==
=== Individual road race ===
| Year | (gold) Gold Medal | (silver) Silver Medal | (bronze) Bronze Medal |
|---|---|---|---|
| 2001 | (Japan) Fumiyuki Beppu | (Malaysia) Mohd Sayuti Mohd Zahit | (Japan) Yuriy Yuda |
| 2004 | (Kazakhstan) Bolat Raimbekov | (South Korea) Lee Won-jae | (Kazakhstan) Roman Kireyev |
| 2005 | (Kazakhstan) Alexandr Kilibayev | (Japan) Nakano Akihito | (United Arab Emirates) |
| 2006 | (Kazakhstan) Sergey Kuzin | (Kazakhstan) Alexandr Afanasyev | (Kazakhstan) Andrey Kucherov |
| 2007 | (Japan) Hayato Yoshida | (Iran) Behnam Khalilikhosroshahi | (Iran) Hamed Jannat |
| 2008 | (Japan) Masanori Noguchi | (Hong Kong) Choi Ki Ho | (South Korea) Choe Hyeong-min |
| 2009 | (Kazakhstan) Arman Kamyshev | (Malaysia) Adiq Husainie Othman | (Japan) Kyosuke Kasahara |
| 2010 | (Kazakhstan) Alexey Lutsenko | (Kazakhstan) Maxat Ayazbayev | (Iran) Ali Khademi |
| 2011 | (South Korea) Park Sang-hoon | (Hong Kong) Wong Tsz Chin | (Philippines) Rustom Lim |
| 2012 | (Japan) Hiroki Nishimura | (Japan) Yuri Kobashi | (Hong Kong) Leung Chun Wing |
| 2013 | (Kazakhstan) Yerlan Pernebekov | (Kazakhstan) Dmitriy Rive | (Japan) Saya Kuroeda |
| 2014 | (Kazakhstan) Grigoriy Shtein | (Kazakhstan) Yevgeniy Ginich | (Kazakhstan) Alexey Voloshin |
| 2015 | (Japan) Keitaro Sawada | (Thailand) Patompob Phonarjthan | (South Korea) Kang Tae-woo |
| 2016 | (Kazakhstan) Vadim Pronskiy | (Iran) Amir Hoss Jamshidian Ghalehsefidi | (Japan) Ayumu Watanabe |

=== Individual time trial ===
| Year | (gold) Gold Medal | (silver) Silver Medal | (bronze) Bronze Medal |
|---|---|---|---|
| 1999 | (South Korea) Lee Woo-jung | (Iran) Abbas Saeidi Tanha | (Iran) Mehdi Sohrabi |
| 2004 | (South Korea) Joo Hyun-wook | (Iran) Hossein Nateghi | (Kazakhstan) Roman Kireyev |
| 2005 | (Iran) Hossein Nateghi | (South Korea) Lee Jin-woo | (United Arab Emirates) |
| 2006 | (Iran) Behman Khalilikhosroshahi | (South Korea) Lee Jae-yong | (Chinese Taipei) Feng Chun-kai |
| 2007 | (Iran) Behnam Khalilikhosroshahi | (Kazakhstan) Yevgeniy Pelyaikin | (Japan) Kazushige Kuboki |
| 2008 | (South Korea) Choe Hyeong-min | (Uzbekistan) Dmitriy Melikov | (Malaysia) Adiq Husainie Othman |
| 2009 | (Hong Kong) Cheung King Lok | (Kazakhstan) Daniil Fominykh | (Uzbekistan) Roman Dronin |
| 2010 | (South Korea) Park Sang-hoon | (Kazakhstan) Alexey Lutsenko | (Iraq) Saad Ali Yaseen Al Sammirraie |
| 2011 | (Iran) Amir Kolahdozhagh | (Hong Kong) Leung Chun Wing | (South Korea) Park Sang-hoon |
| 2012 | (Hong Kong) Leung Chun Wing | (Japan) Hiroki Nishimura | (Kazakhstan) Robert Gaineyev |
| 2013 | (Kazakhstan) Dmitriy Rive | (Japan) Masaki Yamamoto | (Iran) Mehdi Ebadallahirafsanjani |
| 2014 | (South Korea) Kim Ji-hun | (Kazakhstan) Alisher Zhumakan | (Japan) Keigo Kusaba |
| 2015 | | (Thailand) Yuttana Mano | (Iran) Mohammad Ganjkhanlou |

== Women's road events ==
=== Individual road race ===
| Year | (gold) Gold Medal | (silver) Silver Medal | (bronze) Bronze Medal |
|---|---|---|---|
| 2001 | (South Korea) Hee Han-song | (Vietnam) Nguyen Thi Hai Ha | (South Korea) Choi Hye-kyeong |
| 2004 | (Japan) Mayuko Hagiwara | (South Korea) Son Hee-jung | (China) Ma Libo |
| 2005 | (South Korea) Son He-jung | (South Korea) Park Eun-mi | (South Korea) Ha Seon-ha |
| 2006 | (Thailand) Thatsani Wichana | (Kazakhstan) Mariya Slokotovich | (South Korea) Kim Eun-hee |
| 2007 | (South Korea) Kim Hye-rim | (Kazakhstan) Mariya Slokotovich | (Malaysia) Fatehah Mustapa |
| 2008 | (South Korea) Na Ah-reum | (South Korea) Son Eun-ju | (South Korea) Lee Ae-jung |
| 2009 | (South Korea) Rhee Hee-joo | (Chinese Taipei) Lin Chia-hui | (Vietnam) Thu Doan Thi |
| 2010 | (South Korea) Kim Hyun-ji | (Vietnam) Nguyen Thi That | (Chinese Taipei) Lin Chia-hui |
| 2011 | (Hong Kong) Leung Bo Yee | (Vietnam) Nguyen Thi That | (Hong Kong) Liu Wai Ting |
| 2012 | (Kazakhstan) Marzhan Baitleuova | (Hong Kong) Pang Yao | (Chinese Taipei) Lin Yi-ju |
| 2013 | (Hong Kong) Pang Yao | (Japan) Kiyoka Sakaguchi | (Jordan) Razan Soboh |
| 2014 | (Kazakhstan) Nadezhda Geneleva | (Japan) Yumi Kajihara | (Japan) Kiyoka Sakaguchi |
| 2015 | (Japan) Yumi Kajihara | (Chinese Taipei) Yao Chang | (Hong Kong) Leung Hoi Wah |
| 2016 | (Japan) Misuzu Shimoyama | (Chinese Taipei) Ting Ting Chang | (Japan) Yumena Hosoya |

=== Individual time trial ===
| Year | (gold) Gold Medal | (silver) Silver Medal | (bronze) Bronze Medal |
|---|---|---|---|
| 1999 | (Japan) Mayumi Fukui | (China) Liu Dan | (South Korea) Park Won-sun |
| 2004 | (Japan) Mayuko Hagiwara | (China) Ma Libo | (South Korea) Son Hee-jung |
| 2005 | (China) Chen Jing | (South Korea) Ha Seon-ha | (Kazakhstan) Lyubov Dombitskaya |
| 2006 | (South Korea) Lee Joo-mi | (Malaysia) Fatehah Mustapa | (Kazakhstan) Mariya Slokotovich |
| 2007 | (South Korea) Kim Eun-hee | (Indonesia) Yanthi Fuchiyanti | (Thailand) Supaksorn Nuntana |
| 2008 | (South Korea) Na Ah-reum | (South Korea) Son Eun-ju | (Kazakhstan) Nataliya Yelisseyeva |
| 2009 | (Kazakhstan) Tatyana Ulbrikht | (Vietnam) Thu Doan Thi | (Vietnam) Lieu Phan Thi |
| 2010 | (Kazakhstan) Tatyana Ulbrikht | (Kazakhstan) Valentina Ulbrikht | (South Korea) Jeong Soo-jeong |
| 2011 | (South Korea) Jeong Soo-jeong | (Hong Kong) Leung Bo Yee | (Vietnam) Truong Thi Bich Nhien |
| 2012 | (Hong Kong) Pang Yao | (South Korea) Oh Hyeon-ji | (Vietnam) Truong Thi Bich Nhien |
| 2013 | (Hong Kong) Pang Yao | (Kazakhstan) Yekaterina Yuraitis | (Jordan) Razan Soboh |
| 2014 | (Kazakhstan) Yekaterina Yuraitis | (Japan) Yumi Kajihara | (Uzbekistan) Ekaterina Knebeleva |
| 2015 | (Japan) Yumi Kajihara | (Kazakhstan) Tatyana Geneleva | (Vietnam) Nguyen Thi Thu Mai |

== Men's track events ==
=== Sprint ===
| Year | (gold) Gold Medal | (silver) Silver Medal | (bronze) Bronze Medal |
|---|---|---|---|
| 2001 | (Japan) Kiyofumi Nagai | (South Korea) Choi Jung-wook | (South Korea) Kim Young-man |
| 2004 | (Japan) Atsushi Shibasaki | (Japan) Yudai Nitta | (Chinese Taipei) Peng Chun-chih |
| 2006 | (Malaysia) Azizulhasni Awang | (South Korea) Cheon Ho-shin | (South Korea) Bae Jeong-hyeon |
| 2007 | (South Korea) Lee Ki-han | (Japan) Kazuki Ametani | (Japan) Tomohiro Fukaya |
| 2009 | (South Korea) Son Gyeong-su | (Japan) Makuru Wada | (South Korea) Kim Hee-jun |
| 2010 | (South Korea) Kim Jung-yeol | (South Korea) Han Jae-ho | (Malaysia) Mohd Fattah Amri |
| 2011 | (Malaysia) Mohd Arfy Qhairant Amran | (Japan) Kenta Nagao | (Japan) Koji Tanaka |
| 2012 | (Japan) Ryohei Taniguchi | (South Korea) Jo Ju-hyeon | (Japan) Hiroto Shimizu |
| 2013 | (Malaysia) Muhammad Firdaus Mohd Zonis | (South Korea) Jung Jea-hee | (Japan) Ryuta Nogami |
| 2015 | (South Korea) Kang Min-seong | (Chinese Taipei) Kang Shih-feng | (Malaysia) Muhamad Khairil Nizam Rasol |

=== 1 km time trial ===
| Year | (gold) Gold Medal | (silver) Silver Medal | (bronze) Bronze Medal |
|---|---|---|---|
| 2001 | (South Korea) Choi Jung-wook | (Japan) Yuzo Inoue | (Chinese Taipei) Fang Chun-chiao |
| 2004 | (Japan) Shugo Hayasaka | (Japan) Kazumichi Sugata | (South Korea) Kim Tae-dong |
| 2007 | (Malaysia) Mohd Syami Bahrum | (South Korea) Lee Ki-han | (Japan) Tomohiro Fukaya |
| 2009 | (South Korea) Son Gyeong-su | (Chinese Taipei) Hsu Wei-hsiang | (Iran) Ali Morshedloo |
| 2010 | (South Korea) Kim Min-jun | (Iran) Ali Morshedloo | (Japan) Shotaro Sakamoto |
| 2011 | (Thailand) Satjakul Sianglam | (Malaysia) Mohd Arfy Qhairant Amran | (Japan) Kyohei Shinzan |
| 2012 | (Hong Kong) Leung Chun Wing | (Japan) Ryohei Taniguchi | (South Korea) Jo Ju-hyeon |
| 2013 | (Malaysia) Muhammad Firdaus Mohd Zonis | (South Korea) Kim Hyeon-seok | (Japan) Hayato Okamoto |
| 2015 | (Malaysia) Muhammad Fadhil Mohd Zonis | (Chinese Taipei) Li Chin-yi | (Japan) Jun Minami |

=== Keirin ===
| Year | (gold) Gold Medal | (silver) Silver Medal | (bronze) Bronze Medal |
|---|---|---|---|
| 2004 | (Japan) Shugo Hayasaka | (South Korea) Hong Soon-il | (Malaysia) Sufian Mohd Hafis |
| 2005 | (South Korea) Choi Seon-jae | (Japan) Kohara Masamichi | (China) Wang Quiming |
| 2007 | (Japan) Tomohiro Fukaya | (Japan) Kazuki Ametani | (South Korea) Lee Eu-deun |
| 2009 | (South Korea) Son Gyeong-su | (South Korea) Kim Hee-jun | (Malaysia) Mohd Farhan Amri Zaid |
| 2010 | (South Korea) Han Jae-ho | (South Korea) Kim Min-jun | (Malaysia) Mohd Arfy Qhairant Amran |
| 2012 | (Japan) Ryohei Taniguchi | (Japan) Hiroto Shimizu | (South Korea) Wang Ji-hyeon |
| 2013 | (Malaysia) Muhammad Firdaus Mohd Zonis | (South Korea) Jung Jea-hee | (South Korea) Kim Yeong-soo |
| 2015 | (Chinese Taipei) Kang Shih-feng | (South Korea) Oh Je-seok | (Malaysia) Mohamad Shariz Efendi Mohd Shahrin |

=== Individual pursuit ===
| Year | (gold) Gold Medal | (silver) Silver Medal | (bronze) Bronze Medal |
|---|---|---|---|
| 2004 | (South Korea) Ju Hyun-wook | (Iran) Hossein Nateghi | (Japan) Teruya Boshu |
| 2005 | (South Korea) Hwang In-hyeok | (Kazakhstan) Berik Kupeshov | (Iran) Hossein Nateghi |
| 2007 | (South Korea) Shin Dong-hyun | (South Korea) Kim Young-uk | (Iran) Behnam Khalilikhosroshahi |
| 2009 | (Hong Kong) Cheung King Lok | (South Korea) Park Keon-woo | (Japan) Atsuki Nomura |
| 2010 | (South Korea) Kim Hong-ki | (Kazakhstan) Dias Omirzakov | (Chinese Taipei) Peng Yuan-tan |
| 2011 | (South Korea) Kim Hong-ki | (Iran) Payam Sadipour | (Japan) Kohei Kurose |
| 2012 | (Hong Kong) Leung Chun Wing | (Kazakhstan) Robert Gaineyev | (Japan) Kohei Suzuki |
| 2015 | (South Korea) Lee Tae-un | (Chinese Taipei) Chen Chien-chou | (Hong Kong) Maximilian Gil Mitchelmore |

=== Points race ===
| Year | (gold) Gold Medal | (silver) Silver Medal | (bronze) Bronze Medal |
|---|---|---|---|
| 2001 | (South Korea) Choi Dae-young | (Japan) Go Takashima | (Japan) Takeshi Ikeda |
| 2004 | (South Korea) Ju Hyun-wook | (Kazakhstan) Dmitry Andryuchshenko | (Japan) Teruya Boshu |
| 2007 | (Iran) Behnam Khalilikhosroshahi | (Iran) Hamed Jannat | (South Korea) Shin Dong-hyun |
| 2009 | (Japan) Genki Yamamoto | (Hong Kong) Choi Ki Ho | (Kazakhstan) Artyom Zakharov |
| 2010 | (South Korea) Kim Hong-ki | (Uzbekistan) Roman Dronin | (Japan) Shiki Kuroeda |
| 2011 | (Japan) Eiya Hashimoto | (Hong Kong) Leung Chun Wing | (South Korea) Park Sang-hoon |
| 2012 | (Hong Kong) Leung Chun Wing | (Kazakhstan) Bakyt Gainulin | (Japan) Taisei Kobayashi |
| 2015 | (Chinese Taipei) Chen Chien-chou | (Iran) Mohammad Ganjkhanlou | (Uzbekistan) Dilmurodjon Siddikov |

=== Scratch ===
| Year | (gold) Gold Medal | (silver) Silver Medal | (bronze) Bronze Medal |
|---|---|---|---|
| 2004 | (Japan) Kazumichi Sugata | (Uzbekistan) Vadim Shaehov | (Kazakhstan) Berik Kupeshov |
| 2007 | (Thailand) Thurakit Boonrattanthanakorn | (South Korea) Kim Young-uk | (Japan) Hayato Yoshida |
| 2009 | (Hong Kong) Cheung King Lok | (Japan) Kyosuke Kasahara | (Malaysia) Adiq Husainie Othman |
| 2010 | (Uzbekistan) Timur Gumerov | (Hong Kong) Cheung Fu Shiu | (Japan) Shogo Ichimaru |
| 2011 | (Japan) Genki Kobota | (South Korea) Kim Hong-ki | (Thailand) Thanawut Sanikwathi |
| 2012 | (Japan) Takuya Takashi | (Thailand) Setthawut Yordsuwan | (Malaysia) Muhammad Firdaus Suardi |
| 2013 | (Malaysia) Irwandie Lakasek | (Hong Kong) Lau Wan Hei | (Chinese Taipei) Li Yi-lin |
| 2014 | (Chinese Taipei) Hsuan Ping-hsu | (Iran) Mohammad Ganjkhanlou | (Japan) Kento Matsumoto |
| 2015 | (Thailand) Patompob Phonarjthan | (South Korea) Woo Yong-suk | (Malaysia) Eiman Firdaus Mohd Zamri |

=== Madison ===
| Year | (gold) Gold Medal | (silver) Silver Medal | (bronze) Bronze Medal |
|---|---|---|---|
| 2007 | Thailand | South Korea | Kazakhstan |
| 2009 | Hong Kong; Cheung King Lok; Choi Ki Ho | Kazakhstan; Matvey Nikitin; Altair Magzom | Malaysia; Adiq Husainie Othman; Mohd Zulhilmie Ahmad Zamri |

=== Elimination race ===
| Year | (gold) Gold Medal | (silver) Silver Medal | (bronze) Bronze Medal |
|---|---|---|---|
| 2001 | (Kazakhstan) Yuriy Yuda | (South Korea) Lee Hyun-ku | (Kazakhstan) Alexey Koslessov |
| 2005 | (South Korea) Hwang In-hyeok | (Japan) Syo Saeki | (South Korea) Kang Dong-jin |

=== Team sprint ===
| Year | (gold) Gold Medal | (silver) Silver Medal | (bronze) Bronze Medal |
|---|---|---|---|
| 2004 | Japan | South Korea | Chinese Taipei |
| 2007 | Japan; Tomohiro Fukaya; Kazuki Ametani; Yuta Yamashita | South Korea | Chinese Taipei |
| 2009 | South Korea; Son Gyeong-su; Han Jae-ho; Kim Hee-jun | Japan; Makuru Wada; Hiroshi Kimura; Shuki Sakamoto | Malaysia; Mohd Farhan Amri Zaid; Mohd Fattah Amri Zaid; Mohd Fakhrudin Daud |
| 2010 | South Korea; Han Jae-ho; Kim Jung-yeol; Kim Min-jun | Iran; Amir Khadivi; Resa Jebreili; Ali Morshedloo | Japan; Yuka Ito; Hiroshi Kimura; Shotaro Sakamoto |
| 2011 | Japan; Koji Tanaka; Kenta Nagao; Kyohei Shinzan | Malaysia; Mohd Arfy Qhairant Amran; Muhamad Fauzan Nor Azman; Hamdan Hamidun | Iran; Edris Kazemy; Aboulfazl Zarezadehmehrizi; Mohammad Daneshvarkhourram |
| 2012 | Japan; Ryohei Taniguchi; Hiroto Shimizu; Takuya Takashi | South Korea; Wang Ji-hyeon; Jo Ju-hyeon; Kim Yeong-soo | Malaysia; Muhammad Fauzan Nor Azman; Malek Marcus McCrone; Muhammad Asri Suraizi Mat Riadzi |
| 2013 | South Korea; Kim; Jung; Kim | Malaysia; Muhammad Firdaus Mohd Zonis; Mohd Shah Firdaus Sahrom; Asyraf Naim Ying | Japan; Okamoto; Nogami; Kubota |
| 2015 | Chinese Taipei; Li Chin-yi; Kang Shih-feng; Huang Chih-ping | Malaysia; Muhamad Khairil Nizam Rasol; Mohamad Shariz Efendi Mohd Shahrin; Muhammad Fadhil Mohd Zonis | South Korea; Kang Min-seong; Oh Je-seok; Kim Dong-ha |

=== Team pursuit ===
| Year | (gold) Gold Medal | (silver) Silver Medal | (bronze) Bronze Medal |
|---|---|---|---|
| 2000 | | | China; Zhang Liang |
| 2001 | South Korea; Chang Sun-jae; Park Hun-ho; Kwang Hun-sin; Choi Dae-young | Japan; Masanao Usui; Shuhei Myochin; Go Takashima; Takeshi Ikeda | Not awarded |
| 2004 | South Korea | Japan | Kazakhstan |
| 2005 | South Korea | Kazakhstan | Japan |
| 2006 | Chinese Taipei | South Korea | Kazakhstan |
| 2009 | Kazakhstan; Matvey Nikitin; Nikita Panassenko; Dias Omirzakov; Altair Magzom | South Korea; Choi Yoon-hyuk; Choi Hyun-soo; Jung Ji-min; Park Keon-woo | Iran; Meysam Aminiaghbolaghi; Hamid Beikkhormizi; Moein Jamali; Ali Khademi |
| 2010 | South Korea; Kim Hong-ki; Park Sang-hoon; Lee Ki-ju; Park Jae-hyung | Kazakhstan; Dias Omirzakov; Nikita Panassenko; Vladimir Dubrovskiy; Matvey Nikitin | Malaysia; Muhammad Shahriwan Mohd Shari; Hanidam Hamidun; Mohammad Al Ghazali Abd Hamid; Amirul Anuar Jafri |
| 2011 | Japan; Kyohei Shinzan; Kohei Kurose; Eiya Hashimoto; Genki Kobota | South Korea; Kang Suk-ho; Park Sang-hoon; Kim Hong-ki; An Yeong-mun | Iran; Payam Sadipour; Aref Bigonahdostkar; Saijad Jafarnasab; Amir Kolahdozhagh |
| 2012 | Kazakhstan; Robert Gaineyev; David Khabibulin; Bakyt Gainulin; Yegor Nikitin | Japan; Takuya Takashi; Kohei Suzuki; Kazuki Ito; Taisei Kobayashi | Hong Kong; Ho Shek Yan; Lau Wan Hei; Leung Chun Wing; Mow Ching Ying |
| 2015 | Kazakhstan; Sergey Shatovkin; Alisher Zhumakan; Assylkhan Turar; Vladimir Tsoy | South Korea; Lee Tae-un; Jung Woo-ho; Kang Tae-woo; Woo Yong-suk | Japan; Keitaro Sawada; Shunsuke Imamura; Kai Yasuda; Yoshimichi Yasukawa |

== Women's track events ==
=== Sprint ===
| Year | (gold) Gold Medal | (silver) Silver Medal | (bronze) Bronze Medal |
|---|---|---|---|
| 2001 | (Japan) Tomoko Endo | (South Korea) Sung Noh-hyo | (Thailand) Kanjanarom Chalaaredisai |
| 2004 | (South Korea) You Jin-a | (China) Wang Qian | (Japan) Nozomi Oka |
| 2006 | (Chinese Taipei) Lin Szu-ping | (Thailand) Jutatip Maneephan | (Malaysia) Fatehah Mustapa |
| 2009 | (South Korea) Lee Hye-jin | (South Korea) Rhee Hee-joo | (Chinese Taipei) Lin Chia-hui |
| 2010 | (South Korea) Lee Hye-jin | (Chinese Taipei) Lin Chia-hui | (Malaysia) Jupha Somnet |
| 2011 | (South Korea) Cho Sun-young | (South Korea) Han Song-yi | (Thailand) Apinya Promboot |
| 2012 | (South Korea) An Hye-ji | (Malaysia) Ummi Hamimah Mohamad | (South Korea) Kim So-la |
| 2013 | (South Korea) Jang Yeon-hee | (India) Deborah | (Malaysia) Farihah Shahwati Mohd Adnan |
| 2014 | (China) Wanling Gong | (China) Lanlan Xia | (South Korea) Jang Yeon-hee |
| 2015 | (Chinese Taipei) Yao Chang | (South Korea) Kim Soo-hyun | (Japan) Karin Okubo |

=== 500 m time trial ===
| Year | (gold) Gold Medal | (silver) Silver Medal | (bronze) Bronze Medal |
|---|---|---|---|
| 2001 | (Japan) Tomoko Endo | (South Korea) Sung Noh-hyo | (Chinese Taipei) Chuan Hsu-shu |
| 2004 | (China) Wang Qian | (South Korea) You Jin-a | (South Korea) Son Hee-jung |
| 2009 | (South Korea) Lee Hye-jin | (Indonesia) Riska Aeustin | (Chinese Taipei) Wu Kuan-hui |
| 2010 | (South Korea) Lee Hye-jin | (Malaysia) Jupha Somnet | (Chinese Taipei) Lin Chia-hui |
| 2011 | (South Korea) Cho Sun-young | (Malaysia) Jupha Somnet | (Thailand) Apinya Promboot |
| 2012 | (Chinese Taipei) Cheng Yu-hsiu | (South Korea) An Hye-ji | (Malaysia) Lauretta Eva Adrian |
| 2013 | (South Korea) Jang Yeon-hee | (Chinese Taipei) Cheng Yu-shiou | (India) Deborah |
| 2015 | (Chinese Taipei) Yao Chang | (South Korea) Kim Soo-hyun | (Japan) Karin Okubo |

=== Keirin ===
| Year | (gold) Gold Medal | (silver) Silver Medal | (bronze) Bronze Medal |
|---|---|---|---|
| 2009 | (South Korea) Youn A-yeoung | (Chinese Taipei) Lin Chia-hui | (Indonesia) Tiur Ellyana |
| 2011 | (South Korea) Cho Sun-young | (South Korea) Han Song-yi | (Malaysia) Jupha Somnet |
| 2012 | (South Korea) Kim So-la | (Malaysia) Ummi Hamimah Mohamad | (South Korea) Oh Hyeon-ji |
| 2013 | (Chinese Taipei) Cheng Yu-shiou | (India) T. Manorama Devi | (South Korea) Jang Yeon-hee |
| 2015 | (Japan) Nao Suzuki | (Japan) Karin Okubo | (South Korea) Kim Soo-hyun |

=== Individual pursuit ===
| Year | (gold) Gold Medal | (silver) Silver Medal | (bronze) Bronze Medal |
|---|---|---|---|
| 2004 | (Japan) Mayuko Hagiwara | (South Korea) Kim Su-hyeon | (China) Ma Libo |
| 2005 | (China) Chen Jing | (South Korea) Son Hee-jung | (South Korea) Ha Seon-ha |
| 2006 | (South Korea) Lee Joo-mi | (South Korea) Kim Eun-hee | (Chinese Taipei) Liu Kuei-shan |
| 2007 | (South Korea) Kim Eun-hee | (South Korea) Kim Kye-him | (Kazakhstan) Nataliya Yelisseye |
| 2009 | (South Korea) Rhee Hee-joo | (Chinese Taipei) Wu Kuan-hui | Not awarded |
| 2010 | (South Korea) Jeong Soo-jeong | (Kazakhstan) Tatyana Ulbrikht | (Hong Kong) Leung Bo Yee |
| 2011 | (South Korea) Oh Hyeon-ji | (Thailand) Jariya Chumluae | (Hong Kong) Leung Bo Yee |
| 2012 | (South Korea) Oh Hyeon-ji | (Hong Kong) Pang Yao | (Chinese Taipei) Lee Tai-ling |
| 2015 | (Japan) Yumi Kajihara | (Chinese Taipei) Yao Chang | (Kazakhstan) Nadezhda Geneleva |

=== Points race ===
| Year | (gold) Gold Medal | (silver) Silver Medal | (bronze) Bronze Medal |
|---|---|---|---|
| 2001 | (South Korea) Han Song-hee | (South Korea) Choi Gae-kyung | (Japan) Mami Matsunaga |
| 2004 | (South Korea) Kim Su-hyeon | (Chinese Taipei) Fang Ju-i | (Malaysia) Leow Hoay Sim |
| 2005 | (South Korea) Ha Seon-ha | (China) Chen Jing | (Chinese Taipei) Lu Yu-chieh |
| 2007 | (South Korea) Kim Hye-rim | (South Korea) Kim Eun-hee | (Kazakhstan) Mariya Slokotovich |
| 2009 | (South Korea) Rhee Hee-joo | (South Korea) Youn A-yeoung | (Indonesia) Riska Agustin |
| 2010 | (South Korea) Kim Hyun-ju | (Chinese Taipei) Lin Chia-hui | (Malaysia) Norazimah Abdul Rashid |
| 2011 | (South Korea) Oh Hyeon-ji | (Kazakhstan) Valentina Ulbrikht | (Thailand) Jariya Chumluae |
| 2012 | (Uzbekistan) Alexandra Okhvat | (Hong Kong) Pang Yao | (South Korea) Kim So-la |
| 2013 | (Hong Kong) Pang Yao | (South Korea) Choi Ji-hye | (Malaysia) Noor Azian Maslin Sazali |
| 2015 | (Japan) Yumi Kajihara | (Kazakhstan) Nadezhda Geneleva | (Hong Kong) Leung Hoi Wah |

=== Scratch ===
| Year | (gold) Gold Medal | (silver) Silver Medal | (bronze) Bronze Medal |
|---|---|---|---|
| 2009 | (South Korea) Youn A-yeoung | (South Korea) Rhee Hee-joo | (Indonesia) Diyan Sofiatun |
| 2010 | (South Korea) Jeong Soo-jeong | (Chinese Taipei) Lin Chia-hui | (Malaysia) Jupha Somnet |
| 2011 | (South Korea) Oh Hyeon-ji | (Malaysia) Jupha Somnet | (Chinese Taipei) Hsieh Yi-jung |
| 2012 | (Hong Kong) Pang Yao | (Malaysia) Noor Azian Maslin Sazali | (Kazakhstan) Marzhan Baitleuova |
| 2013 | (Hong Kong) Pang Yao | (Chinese Taipei) Lin Yi-ju | (South Korea) Kim You-jin |
| 2015 | (Japan) Nao Suzuki | (Hong Kong) Leung Hoi Wah | (Kazakhstan) Svetlana Ryabova |

=== Elimination race ===
| Year | (gold) Gold Medal | (silver) Silver Medal | (bronze) Bronze Medal |
|---|---|---|---|
| 2001 | (Chinese Taipei) Chang Sun-cheh | (South Korea) Han Song-hee | (Chinese Taipei) Hsu Hsiao-ting |

=== Team sprint ===
| Year | (gold) Gold Medal | (silver) Silver Medal | (bronze) Bronze Medal |
|---|---|---|---|
| 2009 | South Korea; Lee Hye-jin; Rhee Hee-joo | Chinese Taipei; Lin Chia-hui; Wu Kuan-hui | Indonesia; Riska Agustin; Tiur Ellyana |
| 2010 | South Korea; Lee Hye-jin; Kim Hyun-ju | Malaysia; Jupha Somnet; Norazimah Abdul Rashid | Kazakhstan; Tatyana Ulbrikht; Valentina Ulbrikht |
| 2011 | South Korea; Han Song-yi; Cho Sun-young | Malaysia; Jupha Somnet; Lauretta Eva Adrian | Hong Kong; Tsang Hiu-tung; Liu Wai-ting |
| 2012 | Chinese Taipei; Cheng Yu-siou; Hong Yu-ting | South Korea; An Hye-ji; Oh Hyeon-ji | Malaysia; Ummi Hamimah Mohamad; Lauretta Eva Adrian |
| 2014 | China; Wanling Gong; Lanlan Xia | South Korea; Yeonhee JANG; Seuli CHOI | Chinese Taipei; Yao CHANG; Chia Hui CHENG |
| 2015 | Chinese Taipei; Yao Chang; Wang Tzu-chun | Japan; Nao Suzuki; Karin Okubo | South Korea; Kim Soo-hyun; Song Min-ji |

=== Team pursuit ===
| Year | (gold) Gold Medal | (silver) Silver Medal | (bronze) Bronze Medal |
|---|---|---|---|
| 2005 | South Korea | India | Pakistan |
| 2009 | South Korea; Lee Hye-jin; Rhee Hee-joo; Youn A-yeoung | Indonesia; Riska Agustin; Diyan Sofiatun; Tiur Ellyana | Not awarded |
| 2010 | South Korea; Lee Hye-jin; Kim Hyun-ju; Jeong Soo-jeong | Kazakhstan; Tatyana Ulbrikht; Valentina Ulbrikht; Rimma Luchshenko | Not awarded |
| 2011 | South Korea; Jeong Soo-jeong; Cho Sun-young; Oh Hyeon-ji | Malaysia; Jupha Somnet; Lauretta Eva Adrian; Norazimah Abdul Rashid | Thailand; Jariya Chumluae; Hunsa Niyomthai; Siripon Kongkaew |
| 2012 | Hong Kong; Pang Yao; Tsang Hiu Tung; Liu Wai Ting | South Korea; An Hye-ji; Oh Hyeon-ji; Kim So-la | Chinese Taipei; Hong Yu-ting; Lee Tai-ling; Lin Yi-ju |
| 2013 | South Korea; Kim You-jin; Choi Ji-hye; Shin Ji-yeong; Im Sa-rang | Chinese Taipei; Hung Yu-ting; Lin Yi-ju; Hsu Ssu-yen; Wu Yu-ting | Kazakhstan; Venera Murzalina; Yekaterina Yuraitis; Faina Potapova; Alyona Sokolova |
| 2015 | Japan; Yumi Kajihara; Nao Suzuki; Yuya Hashimoto; Kie Furuyama | South Korea; Kim Soo-hyun; Song Min-ji; Kim Ok-hui; Kim Dae-un | Kazakhstan; Svetlana Ryabova; Nadezhda Geneleva; Tatyana Geneleva; Viktoriya Pastarnak |
