= Leung Ka Yu =

Hong Kong cyclist (born 1996)

Personal information
- Full name: Leung Ka Yu
- Born: 28 May 1996 (age 30)

Cycling career
- Sport: Cycling
- Current team: HKSI Pro Cycling Team
- Disciplines: Road; Track
- Role: Rider

Professional team
- 2015–: HKSI Pro Cycling Team
Medal record
Men's track cycling
Representing Hong Kong
Asian Games
Silver medal – second place	2018 Jakarta-Palembang	Team pursuit
Silver medal – second place	2022 Hangzhou	Omnium
Asian Championships
Silver medal – second place	2023 Nilai	Madison
Bronze medal – third place	2020 Jincheon	Team pursuit
Bronze medal – third place	2019 Jakarta	Scratch

Leung Ka Yu (Chinese: 梁嘉儒; born 28 May 1996) is a Hong Kong road and track cyclist, who currently rides for UCI Continental team HKSI Pro Cycling Team.

== Major results ==
=== Road ===
2013
1st Road race, National Junior Road Championships
4th Time trial, Asian Junior Road Championships
2014
1st Time trial, National Junior Road Championships
5th Time trial, Asian Junior Road Championships
2017
3rd Team time trial, Asian Road Championships
3rd Time trial, National Under-23 Road Championships
2018
5th Road race, National Road Championships
2019
3rd Team time trial, Asian Road Championships
National Road Championships

3rd Road race
3rd Time trial

=== Track ===
2013
National Junior Track Championships

1st Kilo
1st Individual pursuit
1st Omnium

2014
1st Team pursuit, National Track Championships (with Leung Chun Wing, Wu Lok Chun & Cheung King Wai)
2015
National Track Championships

1st Team pursuit (with Leung Chun Wing, Maximilian Gil Mitchelmore & Law Kwun Wa)
1st Team sprint (with Leung Chun Wing & Law Kwun Wa)

2017
1st Scratch, National Track Championships
2018
1st Omnium, National Track Championships
2nd Team pursuit, Asian Games
2019
3rd Scratch, Asian Track Championships
2020
3rd Team pursuit, Asian Track Championships
