= Tuulkhangain Tögöldör =

Mongolian cyclist (born 1985)

Personal information
- Full name: Tuulkhangain Tögöldör
- Born: June 17, 1985 (age 41) Mongolia

Cycling career
- Sport: Cycling
- Discipline: Road
- Role: Rider

Amateur team
- 2019: Khas Bank Cycling Team

Professional teams
- 2013: Malak Cycling Team
- 2014: Ningxia Sports Lottery Cycling Team
- 2018: RTS Racing Team
- 2019: Yunnan Lvshan Landscape

Tuulkhangai Tuguldur (Mongolian: Туулхангайн Төгөлдөр, born June 17, 1985) is a Mongolian cyclist, who last rode for UCI Continental team Yunnan Lvshan Landscape.

== Major results ==
2007
National Road Championships

2nd Road race
2nd Time trial

2008
National Road Championships

1st Time trial
3rd Road race

2009
1st Overall Tour of Mongolia

1st Stages 1, 4, 5 & 6

2nd Time trial, National Road Championships
5th Road race, East Asian Games
2010
National Road Championships

1st Road race
1st Time trial

5th Overall Tour of Thailand
2011
National Road Championships

2nd Road race
3rd Time trial

2012
5th Time trial, Asian Road Championships
2013
1st Stage 2 Tour of Poyang Lake
3rd Road race, East Asian Games
Asian Road Championships

6th Time trial
7th Road race

2014
National Road Championships

1st Time trial
3rd Road race

Asian Road Championships

4th Time trial
7th Road race

2015
National Road Championships

1st Time trial
3rd Road race

6th Time trial, Asian Road Championships
2016
National Road Championships

2nd Road race
2nd Time trial

2018
3rd Time trial, National Road Championships
Asian Road Championships

4th Team time trial
8th Road race

2019
3rd Time trial, National Road Championships
4th Team time trial, Asian Road Championships
