= Pang Yao =

Hong Kong cyclist (born 1995)

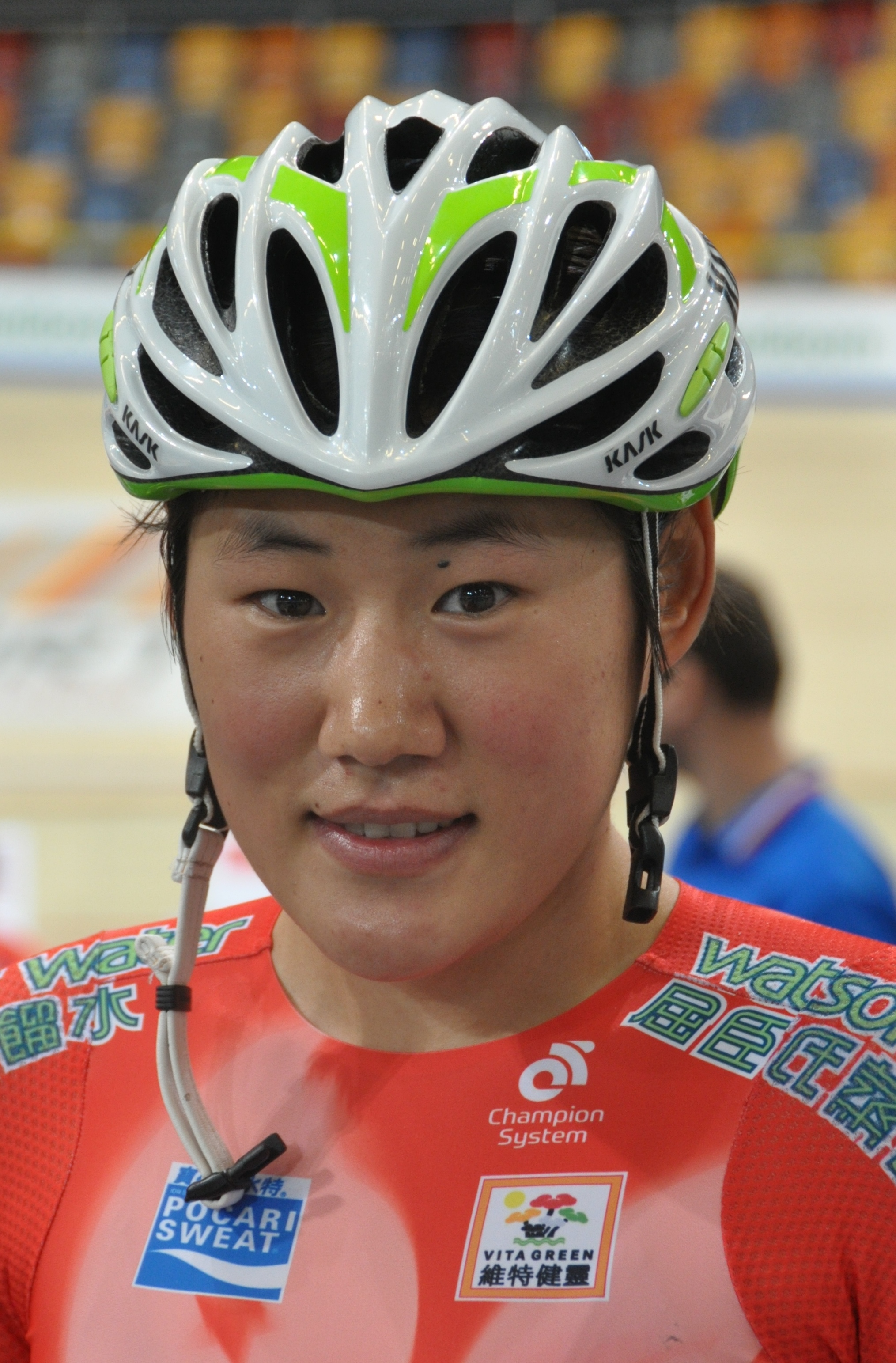
- Pang in 2016

Personal information
- Born: 27 May 1995 (age 31) Dalian, Liaoning, China

Cycling career
- Sport: Cycling
- Disciplines: Track; Road
- Role: Rider
- Rider type: Endurance

Professional team
- 2021: China Liv Pro Cycling
Medal record
Representing Hong Kong
Women's track cycling
Asian Games
Silver medal – second place	2018 Jakarta-Palembang	Madison
Asian Championships
Gold medal – first place	2017 New Delhi	Madison
Gold medal – first place	2020 Jincheon	Madison
Silver medal – second place	2014 Astana	Individual pursuit
Silver medal – second place	2015 Nakhon Ratchasima	Scratch
Silver medal – second place	2015 Nakhon Ratchasima	Team pursuit
Silver medal – second place	2017 New Delhi	Team pursuit
Bronze medal – third place	2014 Astana	Team pursuit
Bronze medal – third place	2019 Jakarta	Scratch
Women's road cycling
Asian Championships
Bronze medal – third place	2016 Izu	Time trial
Bronze medal – third place	2019 Tashkent	Team time trial

Pang Yao (Chinese: 逄瑤; born 27 May 1995) is a Hong Kong road and track cyclist, who most recently rode for UCI Women's Continental Team China Liv Pro Cycling. She represented her nation as a junior on the road at the 2012 UCI Road World Championships and 2013 UCI Road World Championships and at the track at the 2015 UCI Track Cycling World Championships.

== Major results ==
=== Track ===
2012
Asian Junior Cycling Championships

1st Scratch
1st Team pursuit
2nd Individual pursuit
2nd Points race

2013
Asian Junior Cycling Championships

1st Points race
1st Scratch

2nd Scratch, ACC Track Asia Cup – Thailand Round
2014
Hong Kong International Track Cup

1st Team pursuit (with Meng Zhaojuan, Jamie Wong and Yang Qianyu)
3rd Points race

Asian Track Championships

2nd Individual pursuit
3rd Team pursuit (with Meng Zhaojuan, Jamie Wong and Yang Qianyu)

Japan Track Cup 2

2nd Points race
3rd Omnium

2nd Individual pursuit, Track Clubs ACC Cup
3rd Points race, Japan Track Cup 1
2015
1st Points race, Japan Track Cup
Asian Track Championships

2nd Scratch
2nd Team pursuit (with Leung Bo Yee, Meng Zhaojuan and Yang Qianyu)

2nd Individual pursuit, South Australian Grand Prix
2016
Track Clubs ACC Cup

1st Team pursuit (with Leung Bo Yee, Leung Wing Yee and Yang Qianyu)
2nd Omnium
2nd Points race

Track Asia Cup

1st Individual pursuit
1st Team pursuit (with Leung Bo Yee, Leung Wing Yee and Meng Zhaojuan)

3rd Omnium, ITS Melbourne DISC Grand Prix
2017
Asian Track Championships

1st Madison (with Meng Zhaojuan)
2nd Team pursuit (with Diao Xiaojuan, Leung Bo Yee and Yang Qianyu)

2018
2nd Madison, Asian Games (with Yang Qianyu)
2019
1st Madison, 2020 Asian Track Cycling Championships (with Yang Qianyu)
3rd Scratch, 2019 Asian Track Cycling Championships

=== Road ===
2012
Asian Junior Cycling Championships

1st Time trial
2nd Road race

2013
Asian Junior Road Championships

1st Road race
1st Time trial

2014
2nd Time trial, National Road Championships
5th Time trial, Asian Road Championships
2015
National Road Championships

1st Time trial
3rd Road race

2016
3rd Time trial, Asian Road Championships
2017
National Road Championships

1st Time trial
2nd Road race

Asian Under-23 Road Championships

2nd Road race
2nd Time trial

2018
National Road Championships

1st Road race
2nd Time trial

4th Time trial, Asian Road Championships
2019
National Road Championships

2nd Road race
3rd Time trial

3rd Team time trial, Asian Road Championships
