= Yevgeniy Gidich =

Kazakhstani cyclist (born 1996)

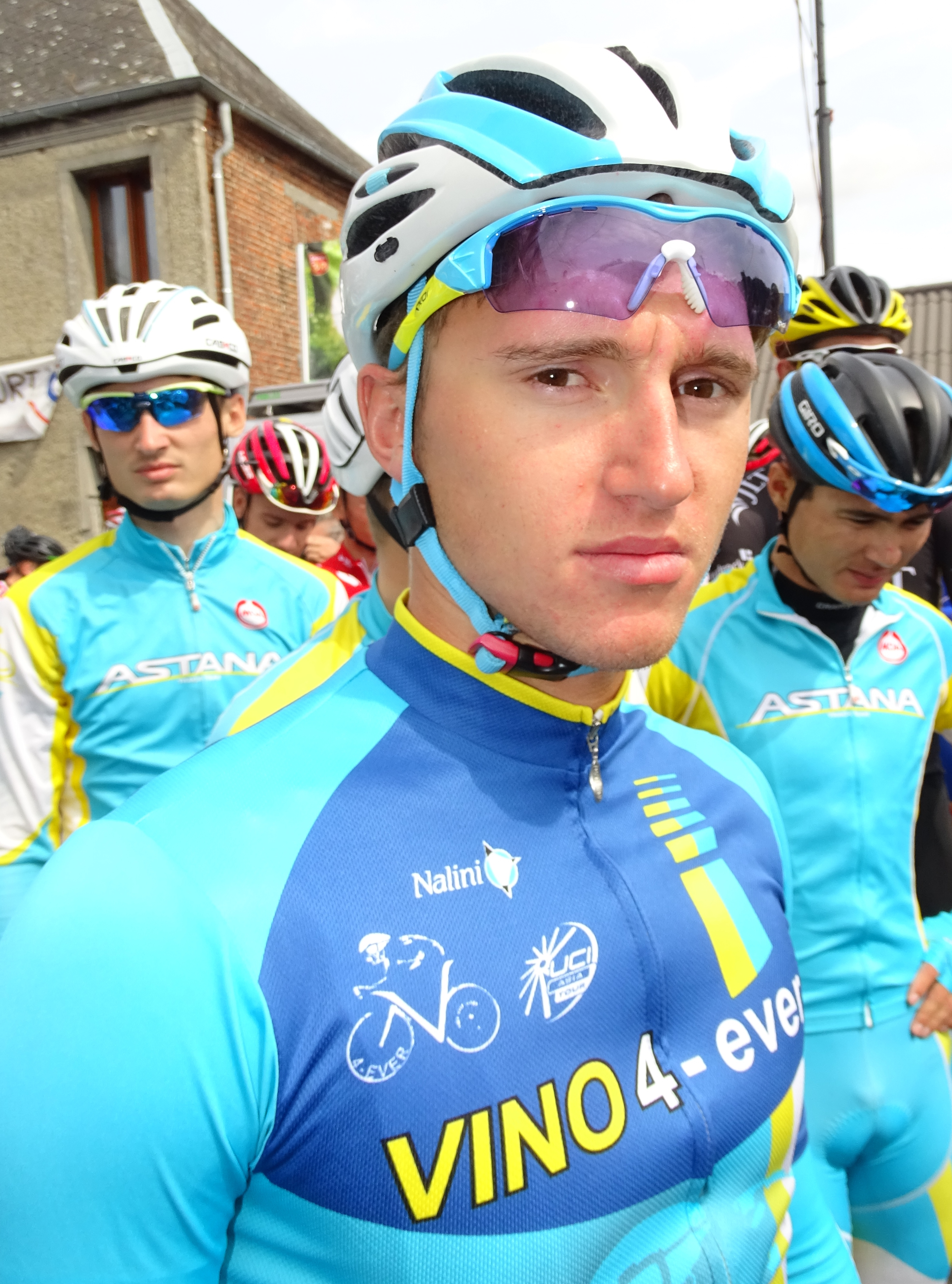
- Gidich at the 2015 Grand Prix des Marbriers.

Personal information
- Born: 19 May 1996 (age 30) Kokshetau, Kazakhstan
- Height: 1.79 m (5 ft 10 in)
- Weight: 69 kg (152 lb)

Cycling career
- Sport: Cycling
- Current team: XDS Astana Team
- Discipline: Road
- Role: Rider
- Rider type: Sprinter

Professional teams
- 2015–2017: Vino 4ever
- 2017: Astana (stagiaire)
- 2018–: Astana

Major wins
- Single-day races and Classics National Road Race Championships (2022)
Medal record
Representing Kazakhstan
Men's road cycling
Asian Championships
Gold medal – first place	2019 Tashkent	Road race
Gold medal – first place	2019 Tashkent	Team time trial
Gold medal – first place	2022 Dushanbe	Team time trial
Silver medal – second place	2023 Rayong	Road race
Silver medal – second place	2014 Astana	Junior road race
Silver medal – second place	2017 Manama	Under-23 road race

Yevgeniy Gidich (born 19 May 1996) is a Kazakhstani professional racing cyclist, who currently rides for UCI WorldTeam XDS Astana Team. He rode in the men's team time trial at the 2015 UCI Road World Championships.

== Major results ==
2014
2nd Road race, Asian Junior Road Championships
2016
1st Stage 6 Tour of Iran (Azerbaijan)
2nd Overall Tour de Filipinas

1st Young rider classification

3rd Road race, National Road Championships
4th Overall Tour of Bulgaria

1st Stage 1

7th Overall Tour of Qinghai Lake

1st Stages 3 & 5

8th Overall Tour de Korea

1st Young rider classification

2017
1st Overall Tour of Thailand

1st Stage 1

1st Stage 13 Tour of Qinghai Lake
2nd Road race, Asian Under–23 Road Championships
3rd Overall Tour de Korea
4th Horizon Park Classic
7th Overall Tour of Almaty
2018
3rd Overall Tour of Croatia

1st Young rider classification

6th Overall Tour de Langkawi
2019
Asian Road Championships

1st Road race
1st Team team trial

1st Stage 3 CRO Race
7th Coppa Bernocchi
2021
2nd Road race, National Road Championships
2022
Asian Road Championships

1st Team time trial
10th Road race

1st Road race, National Road Championships
3rd Grand Prix Gazipaşa
2023
2nd Road race, Asian Road Championships
2nd Road race, National Road Championships
