= Choy Hiu Fung =

Hong Kong cyclist (born 1996)

Personal information
- Born: 17 January 1996 (age 30) Hong Kong

Cycling career
- Sport: Cycling
- Current team: HKSI Pro Cycling Team
- Disciplines: Road; Track
- Role: Rider

Professional team
- 2016–: HKSI Pro Cycling Team

Choy Hiu Fung (Chinese: 蔡曉鋒; Jyutping: coi3 hiu2 fung1; born 17 January 1996) is a Hong Kong road cyclist, who currently rides for UCI Continental team HKSI Pro Cycling Team.

== Major results ==
2013
National Junior Road Championships

2nd Time trial
3rd Road race

2017
9th Overall Tour of Fuzhou
2020
Cambodia Bay Cycling Tour

1st Mountains classification
1st Stage 2
