= Mohammad Rajablou =

Iranian cyclist

Personal information
- Born: 6 April 1985 (age 41) Bukan, Iran

Cycling career
- Sport: Cycling
- Disciplines: Road, track
- Role: Rider

Professional teams
- 2005: Paykan
- 2009: Azad University Iran
- 2013: Ayandeh Continental Team (until 27/6)
- 2014–2015: Pishgaman Yazd
- 2016: Hy Sport–Look Continental (until 12/4)
- 2016–2017: Pishgaman–Giant (from 13/4)
- 2018: Omidnia Mashhad Team
Medal record
Representing Iran
Men's track cycling
Asian Championships
Gold medal – first place	2011 Nakhon Ratchasima	Points race
Silver medal – second place	2011 Nakhon Ratchasima	Madison
Silver medal – second place	2012 Kuala Lumpur	Points race
Silver medal – second place	2017 New Delhi	Scratch
Bronze medal – third place	2013 New Delhi	Points race
Bronze medal – third place	2013 New Delhi	Madison
Bronze medal – third place	2014 Astana	Points race

Mohammad Rajablou (Persian: محمد رجبلو; born 6 April 1985) is an Iranian former professional road cyclist.

== Major results ==
2007
1st Stage 6 Tour of Iran (Azerbaijan)
2010
8th Overall International Presidency Tour
2012
3rd Overall Tour of Vietnam
2016
1st Stage 4 Tour of Japan
6th Overall Tour de Singkarak
2017
2nd National Road Race Championships
2nd National Time Trial Championships
9th Road race, Asian Road Championships
2018
2nd Team time trial, Asian Road Championships
