= Vincent Lau =

Hong Kong cyclist (born 1996)

Vincent Lau Wan Yau
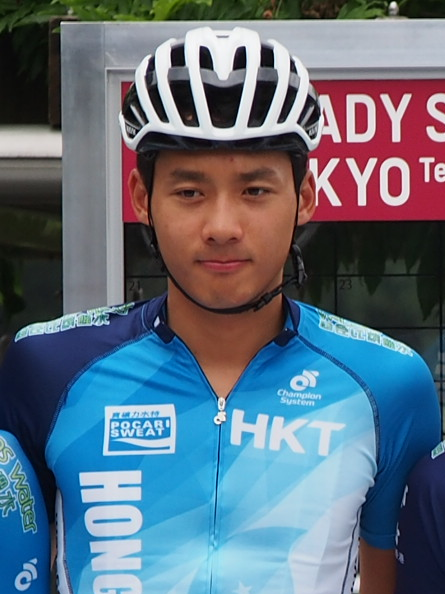
- Lau in 2020

Personal information
- Full name: Vincent Lau Wan Yau
- Born: 23 September 1996 (age 30)

Cycling career
- Sport: Cycling
- Current team: Roojai Insurance Winspace
- Disciplines: Road; Track
- Role: Rider

Professional teams
- 2015–2024: HKSI Pro Cycling Team
- 2024–: Roojai Insurance
Medal record
Representing Hong Kong
Men's road cycling
Asian Games
Bronze medal – third place	2022 Hangzhou	Time trial
Asian Championships
Bronze medal – third place	2024 Almaty	Mixed team relay
Bronze medal – third place	2025 Phitsanulok	Mixed team relay

Vincent Lau Wan Yau (Chinese: 劉允祐; born 23 September 1996) is a Hong Kong road cyclist, who rides for UCI Continental team Roojai Insurance Winspace.

In 2023, he won the bronze medal in the time trial at the 2022 Asian Games. In June 2024, was selected to compete in the road race at the 2024 Summer Olympics.

== Major results ==
2014
3rd Time trial, National Junior Road Championships
2015
National Track Championships

2nd Scratch
2nd Team pursuit

2017
8th Overall Tour de Korea
2018
National Road Championships

2nd Road race
3rd Time trial

6th Road race, Asian Under-23 Road Championships
2019
5th Road race, National Road Championships
2020
8th Overall Cambodia Bay Cycling Tour
2022
National Road Championships

1st Road race
1st Time trial

1st Individual pursuit, National Track Championships
3rd Time trial, Chinese National Road Championships
2023
1st Time trial, National Road Championships
3rd Time trial, Asian Games
8th Road race, Asian Road Championships
2024
1st Time trial, National Road Championships
Asian Road Championships

3rd Mixed team relay
5th Time trial
