= Meng Zhaojuan =

Hong Kong cyclist

Personal information
- Full name: Meng Zhaojuan; Chinese: 孟昭娟
- Born: 14 December 1989 (age 36) Tongliao, Inner Mongolia, China

Cycling career
- Sport: Cycling
- Disciplines: Track; Road
- Role: Rider
- Rider type: Endurance

Professional team
- 2015–2020: China Chongming–Liv–Champion System

Meng Zhaojuan (Chinese: 孟昭娟; born 14 December 1989) is a road and track cyclist, who most recently rode for UCI Women's Continental Team China Liv Pro Cycling. Representing Hong Kong, Meng competed at the 2009, 2010, 2011 and 2015 UCI Track Cycling World Championships. Meng was born in Tongliao, Inner Mongolia, China, and moved to Hong Kong in 2006.

== Major results ==
=== Road ===
2007
7th Time trial, Asian Junior Road Championships
2011
2nd Road race, National Road Championships
2012
3rd Overall Tour of Zhoushan Island

1st Stage 2

5th Road race, Asian Road Championships
2013
3rd Road race, National Road Championships
8th Overall Tour of Thailand
2014
1st Road race, National Road Championships
1st Overall Tour of Thailand

1st Stages 2 & 3

2015
1st Road race, National Road Championships
1st Overall The Princess Maha Chackri Sirindhon's Cup

1st Points classification
1st Stage 3

3rd Road race, Asian Road Championships
10th Overall Tour of Chongming Island
2016
1st Road race, National Road Championships
9th Horizon Park Women Challenge
2017
10th Road race, Asian Road Championships

=== Track ===
2011
Asian Track Championships

3rd Team pursuit
3rd Team sprint

2014
Hong Kong International Track Cup

1st Points race
1st Scratch
1st Team pursuit (with Pang Yao, Jamie Wong and Yang Qianyu)
2nd Keirin
2nd Sprint
3rd 500m time trial

Track Clubs ACC Cup

2nd Keirin
2nd 500m time trial
3rd Sprint

Hong Kong International Track Classic

2nd Keirin
2nd Sprint

3rd Team pursuit, Asian Track Championships (with Pang Yao, Jamie Wong and Yang Qianyu)
2015
2nd Team pursuit, Asian Track Championships (with Leung Bo Yee, Pang Yao and Yang Qianyu)
2016
Track Asia Cup

1st Keirin
1st Team pursuit (with Leung Bo Yee, Leung Wing Yee and Pang Yao)
2nd Sprint

3rd Sprint, Track Clubs ACC Cup
2017
Asian Track Championships

1st Madison (with Pang Yao)
3rd Omnium
