= Yang Qianyu =

Hong Kong cyclist

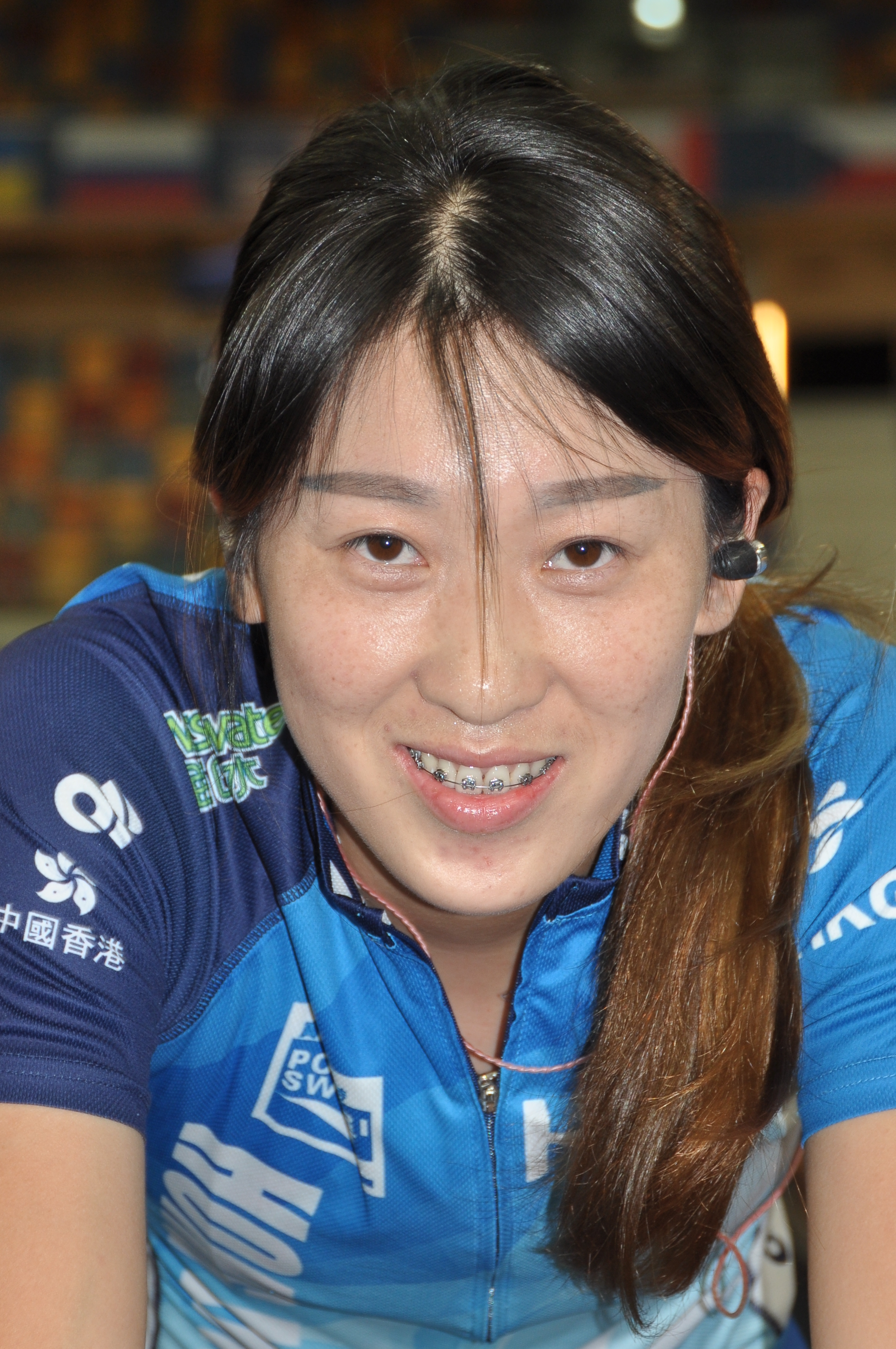
- Yang at the 2018 UCI Track Cycling World Championships

Personal information
- Full name: Yang Qianyu
- Born: 7 March 1993 (age 33) Liaoning, China

Cycling career
- Sport: Cycling
- Disciplines: Road; Track
- Role: Rider

Professional team
- 2021–2022: China Liv Pro Cycling
Medal record
Representing Hong Kong
Women's road bicycle racing
Asian Games
Gold medal – first place	2022 Hangzhou	Road race
Asian Championships
Gold medal – first place	2017 Manama	Road race
Bronze medal – third place	2025 Phitsanulok	Mixed team relay
Women's track cycling
Asian Games
Silver medal – second place	2018 Jakarta-Palembang	Madison
Silver medal – second place	2022 Hangzhou	Madison
Bronze medal – third place	2022 Hangzhou	Team pursuit
Asian Championships
Gold medal – first place	2020 Jincheon	Madison
Silver medal – second place	2014 Astana	Scratch
Silver medal – second place	2015 Nakhon Ratchasima	Individual pursuit
Silver medal – second place	2015 Nakhon Ratchasima	Team pursuit
Silver medal – second place	2016 Izu	Individual pursuit
Silver medal – second place	2017 New Delhi	Team pursuit
Silver medal – second place	2023 Nilai	Elimination
Bronze medal – third place	2014 Astana	Team pursuit
Bronze medal – third place	2025 Nilai	Team pursuit

Yang Qianyu (Chinese: 楊倩玉; born 7 March 1993) is a Hong Kong road and track cyclist, who most recently rode for UCI Women's Continental Team China Liv Pro Cycling. She represented her nation at the 2015 UCI Track Cycling World Championships.

== Major results ==
=== Track ===
2013
2nd Points race, ACC Track Asia Cup – Thailand Round
2014
Hong Kong International Track Cup (January)

1st Team pursuit (with Meng Zhaojuan, Pang Yao and Jamie Wong)
2nd Individual pursuit
3rd Points race

Hong Kong International Track Cup (November)

1st Individual pursuit
2nd Points race
3rd Scratch

Asian Track Championships

2nd Scratch
3rd Team pursuit (with Pang Yao, Meng Zhaojuan and Jamie Wong)

2015
Asian Track Championships

2nd Individual pursuit
2nd Team pursuit (with Leung Bo Yee, Meng Zhaojuan and Pang Yao)

2nd Omnium, Japan Track Cup
2016
Track Clubs ACC Cup

1st Scratch
1st Team pursuit (with Leung Bo Yee, Leung Wing Yee and Pang Yao)

2nd Individual pursuit, Asian Track Championships
3rd Scratch, 2015–16 UCI Track Cycling World Cup, Hong Kong
2017
2nd Scratch, 2017–18 UCI Track Cycling World Cup, Manchester
2nd Team pursuit, Asian Track Championships (with Diao Xiaojuan, Leung Bo Yee and Pang Yao)
2018
2nd Madison, Asian Games (with Pang Yao)
2019
1st Madison, 2020 Asian Track Cycling Championships (with Pang Yao)

=== Road ===
2013
2nd Road race, National Road Championships
2014
National Road Championships

2nd Road race
3rd Time trial

2015
National Road Championships

2nd Road race
2nd Time trial

8th Overall Tour of Zhoushan Island
2016
National Road Championships

1st Time trial
2nd Road race

1st Overall Tour of Thailand

1st Stage 3

5th Horizon Park Women Challenge
6th Road race, Asian Road Championships
7th VR Women ITT
2017
Asian Road Championships

1st Road race
4th Time trial

1st Road race, National Road Championships
2018
National Road Championships

1st Time trial
2nd Road race

4th Road race, Asian Games
6th Road race, Asian Road Championships
2019
National Road Championships

1st Road race
2nd Time trial

2nd China Scenic Avenue I
3rd Team time trial, Asian Road Championships
