= Jin Long =

Jin Long may refer to:

- Jin Long (cyclist), (born 1983), Chinese cyclist
- Jin Long (snooker player), (born 1981), Chinese snooker player
