= Ronald Yeung (cyclist) =

Hong Kong professional cyclist (born 1988)

Personal information
- Full name: Ying Hon Ronald Yeung
- Born: 30 July 1988 (age 38)

Cycling career
- Sport: Cycling
- Current team: Retired
- Discipline: Road
- Role: Rider

Professional teams
- 2014: OCBC Singapore Continental Cycling Team
- 2015: Attaque Team Gusto
- 2016: Delko–Marseille Provence KTM (stagiaire)
- 2016: Wisdom–Hengxiang Cycling Team
- 2017: Infinite AIS Cycling Team

Ying Hon Ronald Yeung (born 30 July 1988) is a Hong Kong former professional cyclist, who rode professionally between 2014 and 2017.

== Major results ==
2008
9th Road race, Asian Road Championships
2009
3rd Road race, East Asian Games
2010
1st Stage 1 Tour de Korea
4th Tour of South China Sea
10th Overall Tour of Japan
2011
2nd Road race, National Road Championships
2nd Overall Tour de East Java

1st Stage 2

8th Overall Tour de Kumano
8th Overall Tour de Indonesia

1st Stage 3

2012
1st Stage 1 Tour de East Java
4th Tour de Okinawa
8th Overall Tour of Fuzhou
9th Overall Tour de Ijen
2013
5th Road race, Asian Road Championships
2014
1st Stage 1 Tour International de Sétif
2nd Road race, National Road Championships
2nd Circuit d'Alger
3rd Overall Tour d'Algérie
5th Critérium International de Sétif
2015
1st Stage 4 Tour of Thailand
2016
1st Stage 3 Tour de Flores
2017
3rd Time trial, National Road Championships
