= 2019 Asian Cycling Championships =

2019 Asian Cycling Championships may refer to:

- 2019 Asian Road Cycling Championships in Tashkent, Uzbekistan on 23–28 April
- 2019 Asian Track Cycling Championships in Jakarta, Indonesia on 9–13 January
