= Ko Siu Wai =

Hong Kong cyclist (born 1987)

Personal information
- Born: 9 November 1987 (age 38) Sha Tin, Hong Kong

Cycling career
- Sport: Cycling
- Current team: HKSI Pro Cycling Team
- Disciplines: Road; Track
- Role: Rider

Professional teams
- 2007: Hong Kong Pro Cycling
- 2014–2023: HKSI Pro Cycling Team
Medal record
Representing Hong Kong
Men's track cycling
Asian Games
Silver medal – second place	2018 Jakarta	Team pursuit
Men's road bicycle racing
Asian Cycling Championships
Bronze medal – third place	2017 Manama	Team time trial
Bronze medal – third place	2018 Naypyidaw	Team time trial
Bronze medal – third place	2019 Tashkent	Team time trial

Ko Siu Wai (Chinese: 高肇蔚; born 9 November 1987) is a Hong Kong road and track cyclist, who rides for UCI Continental team HKSI Pro Cycling Team.

== Major results ==
2011
10th Time trial, Asian Road Championships
2013
5th Road race, National Road Championships
2014
1st Stage 4 Jelajah Malaysia
2015
1st Road race, National Road Championships
9th UAE Cup
2016
3rd Overall Tour of Thailand
2017
National Road Championships

2nd Road race
4th Time trial

3rd Team time trial, Asian Road Championships
2018
National Road Championships

1st Road race
2nd Time trial

2nd Team pursuit, Asian Games
3rd Team time trial, Asian Road Championships
2019
3rd Team time trial, Asian Road Championships
2022
2nd Time trial, National Road Championships
