= HKSI Pro Cycling Team =

Hong Kong cycling team

Team information
- UCI code: HKS
- Registered: Hong Kong
- Founded: 2014
- Discipline: Road
- Status: UCI Continental

Key personnel
- General manager: Jin Long
- Team managers: Hervé Dagorné; Zhang Jie

Team name history
- 2014–: HKSI Pro Cycling Team

HKSI Pro Cycling Team is a Hong Kong-based UCI Continental cycling team established in 2014, based at the Hong Kong Sports Institute.

== Team roster ==
As of 8 September 2023.

Rider	Date of birth
Chu Tsun Wai (HKG)	9 July 2001 (age 25)
Ko Siu Wai (HKG)	9 November 1987 (age 38)
Joseph Lau (HKG)	18 June 2003 (age 23)
Vincent Lau (HKG)	23 September 1996 (age 29)
Leung Chun Wing (HKG)	20 January 1994 (age 32)
Leung Ka Yu (HKG)	28 May 1996 (age 30)

Rider	Date of birth
Liang King Hung (HKG)	21 August 2001 (age 25)
Mow Ching Yin (HKG)	5 June 1995 (age 31)
Ng Pak Hang (HKG)	22 February 1999 (age 27)
Ng Sum Lui (HKG)	28 October 1999 (age 26)
Tso Kai Kwong (HKG)	25 July 2000 (age 26)

== Major wins ==
2014
Hong Kong National Time Trial championships, Cheung King Lok
Hong Kong National U23 Time Trial championships, Leung Chun Wing
Hong Kong National Road Race championships, Cheung King Lok
2015
Stage 1 Tour de Ijen, Cheung King Lok
Stage 4 Tour de Ijen, Leung Chun Wing
Hong Kong National Road Race championships, Siu Wai Ko
Hong Kong National Time Trial championships, Cheung King Lok
2016
Asian Cycling Championships ITT, Cheung King Lok
2017
Hong Kong National Road Race championships, Leung Chun Wing
Hong Kong National Time Trial championships, Leung Chun Wing
Hong Kong National U23 Time Trial championships, Fung Ka Hoo
2018
Hong Kong National Road Race championships, Siu Wai Ko
Hong Kong National Time Trial championships, Ho Burr
2019
Hong Kong National Road Race championships, Cheung King Lok
Hong Kong National Time Trial championships, Fung Ka Hoo
Hong Kong National U23 Time Trial championships, Pak Hang Ng
2020
Stage 2 Cambodia Bay Cycling Tour, Choy Hiu Fung
Mountains classification Cambodia Bay Cycling Tour, Choy Hiu Fung
