= Cycling at the 2010 Asian Games – Men's individual pursuit =

Men's individual pursuit at the 2010 Asian Games
- Venue: Guangzhou Velodrome
- Date: 13–14 November 2010
- Competitors: 25 from 14 nations

Medalists
gold medal	Jang Sun-jae	South Korea
silver medal	Cheung King Lok	Hong Kong
bronze medal	Li Wei	China

The men's 4 kilometres individual pursuit competition at the 2010 Asian Games was held on 13 and 14 November at the Guangzhou Velodrome.

== Schedule ==
All times are China Standard Time (UTC+08:00)

Date	Time	Event
Saturday, 13 November 2010	13:00	Qualifying
Sunday, 14 November 2010	11:55	Round 1
Sunday, 14 November 2010	15:08	Finals

== Records ==
Prior to this competition, the existing world, Asian and Games records were as follows.

World Record	Chris Boardman (GBR)	4:11.114	Manchester, United Kingdom	29 August 1996
Asian Record	Jang Sun-jae (KOR)	4:28.395	Manchester, United Kingdom	26 March 2008
Games Record	Jang Sun-jae (KOR)	4:30.355	Doha, Qatar	9 December 2006

== Results ==
=== Qualifying ===
Rank	Athlete	Time	Notes
1	Jang Sun-jae (KOR)	4:27.992	AR
2	Cheung King Lok (HKG)	4:30.858	
3	Li Wei (CHN)	4:32.336	
4	Alireza Haghi (IRI)	4:34.503	
5	Amir Zargari (IRI)	4:34.850	
6	Vladimir Tuychiev (UZB)	4:35.044	
7	Wang Mingwei (CHN)	4:35.987	
8	Hwang In-hyeok (KOR)	4:37.862	
9	Feng Chun-kai (TPE)	4:38.663	
10	Taiji Nishitani (JPN)	4:39.277	
11	Mohd Akmal Amrun (MAS)	4:41.334	
12	Lee Wei-cheng (TPE)	4:43.103	
13	Yu Motosuna (JPN)	4:43.147	
14	Berik Kupeshov (KAZ)	4:44.538	
15	Cheung King Wai (HKG)	4:44.974	
16	Andrey Kashechkin (KAZ)	4:47.520	
17	Moosa Khalfan Said (QAT)	4:47.807	
18	Ahmed Al-Bardiny (QAT)	4:47.904	
19	John Mier (PHI)	4:53.998	
20	Sombir (IND)	4:57.740	
21	Mohammed Al-Murawwi (UAE)	4:58.684	
22	Rajender Kumar Bishnoi (IND)	5:00.557	
23	Ayman Al-Habriti (KSA)	5:03.184	
24	Jaber Majrashi (KSA)	5:12.344	
25	Yousif Mirza (UAE)	5:15.617	

=== Round 1 ===
==== Heat 1 ====
Rank	Athlete	Time	Notes
1	Alireza Haghi (IRI)	4:35.477	
2	Amir Zargari (IRI)	4:42.899	

==== Heat 2 ====
Rank	Athlete	Time	Notes
1	Li Wei (CHN)	4:32.505	
2	Vladimir Tuychiev (UZB)	4:38.352	

==== Heat 3 ====
Rank	Athlete	Time	Notes
1	Cheung King Lok (HKG)	4:30.931	
2	Wang Mingwei (CHN)	Overlapped	

==== Heat 4 ====
Rank	Athlete	Time	Notes
1	Jang Sun-jae (KOR)	4:26.089	AR
2	Hwang In-hyeok (KOR)	Overlapped	

==== Summary ====
Rank	Athlete	Time
1	Jang Sun-jae (KOR)	4:26.089
2	Cheung King Lok (HKG)	4:30.931
3	Li Wei (CHN)	4:32.505
4	Alireza Haghi (IRI)	4:35.477

=== Finals ===
==== Bronze ====
Rank	Athlete	Time	Notes
3rd place, bronze medalist(s)	Li Wei (CHN)	4:37.458	
4	Alireza Haghi (IRI)	4:40.041	

==== Gold ====
Rank	Athlete	Time	Notes
1st place, gold medalist(s)	Jang Sun-jae (KOR)	4:30.298	
2nd place, silver medalist(s)	Cheung King Lok (HKG)	4:37.543	
