= Cycling at the 2022 Asian Games – Men's individual time trial =

Men's individual time trial at the 2022 Asian Games
- Venue: Chun'an Jieshou Sports Centre
- Date: 3 October 2023
- Competitors: 14 from 14 nations

Medalists
gold medal	Alexey Lutsenko	Kazakhstan
silver medal	Xue Ming	China
bronze medal	Vincent Lau	Hong Kong

The men's 39.6 kilometres road time trial competition at the 2022 Asian Games took place on 3 October 2023 in Chun'an Jieshou Sports Centre.

== Schedule ==
All times are China Standard Time (UTC+08:00)

Date	Time	Event
Tuesday, 3 October 2023	14:00	Final

== Results ==
Rank	Athlete	Time
1st place, gold medalist(s)	Alexey Lutsenko (KAZ)	48:05.75
2nd place, silver medalist(s)	Xue Ming (CHN)	50:05.83
3rd place, bronze medalist(s)	Vincent Lau (HKG)	50:17.76
4	Jang Kyung-gu (KOR)	50:33.34
5	Sergio Tu (TPE)	50:41.56
6	Yuma Koishi (JPN)	51:27.95
7	Sainbayaryn Jambaljamts (MGL)	52:30.99
8	Aiman Cahyadi (INA)	52:33.30
9	Peerapol Chawchiangkwang (THA)	52:36.22
10	Ahmed Madan (BRN)	53:39.58
11	Kam Chin Pok (MAC)	53:42.29
12	Fadhel Al-Khater (QAT)	56:15.31
13	Quàng Văn Cường (VIE)	56:59.72
DQ	Aleksey Fomovskiy (UZB)	~~51:05.75~~

- Aleksey Fomovskiy of Uzbekistan originally finished 6th, but was later disqualified after he tested positive for Anabolic steroids.
