= Tüvshinjargalyn Enkhjargal =

Mongolian cyclist (born 1992)

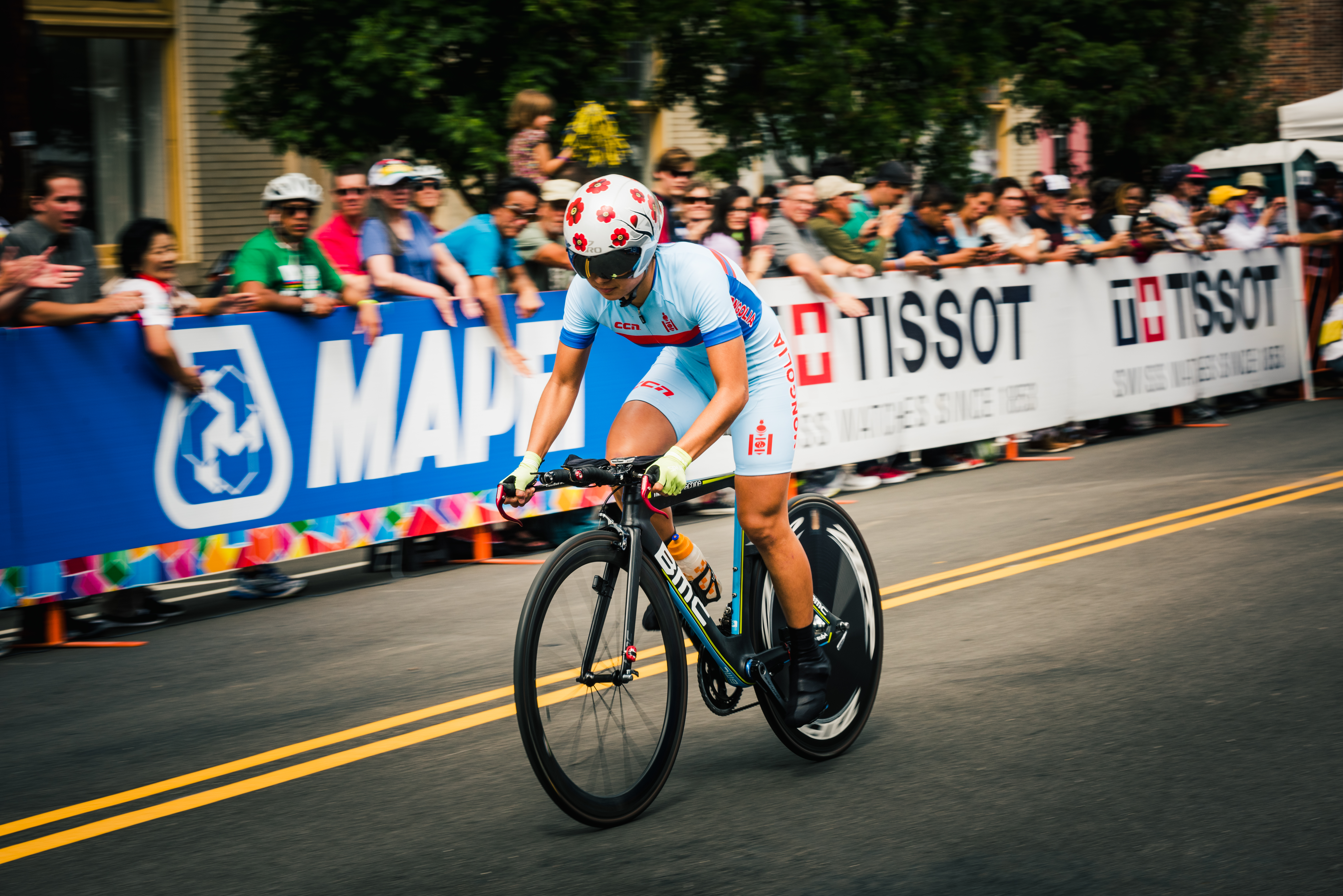
- Tuvshinjargal at the 2015 UCI Road World Championships

Personal information
- Full name: Tüvshinjargalyn Enkhjargal
- Nickname: Enja
- Born: 14 June 1992 (age 34) Ulaanbaatar, Mongolia
- Height: 161 cm (5 ft 3 in)
- Weight: 51 kg (112 lb)

Cycling career
- Sport: Cycling
- Discipline: Road
- Role: Rider
- Rider type: Time trialist
Medal record
Women's road bicycle racing
Representing Mongolia
Asian Championships
Gold medal – first place	2013 New Delhi	Time trial
Bronze medal – third place	2014 Astana	Time trial
Bronze medal – third place	2015 Nakhon Ratchasima	Time trial

Tüvshinjargalyn Enkhjargal (Mongolian: Түвшинжаргалын Энхжаргал; born 14 June 1992) is a Mongolian racing cyclist and triathlete. In road cycling she won the individual time trial at the 2013 Asian Cycling Championships and finished 6th at the 2014 Asian Games. She competed in the 2013 UCI World Championships women's road race in Florence.

She also competes in triathlons and competed in the women's event at the 2010 Asian Games.

== Major results ==
2013
1st Time trial, Asian Road Championships
2014
Asian Road Championships

3rd Time trial
8th Road race

2015
National Road Championships

1st Time trial
1st Road race

3rd Time trial, Asian Road Championships
2016
National Road Championships

1st Time trial
1st Road race

Asian Road Championships

5th Time trial
8th Road race

2018
National Road Championships

2nd Time trial
2nd Road race
