= Ho Burr =

Hong Kong cyclist (born 1992)

Personal information
- Full name: Ho Burr
- Born: 23 September 1992 (age 34) Hong Kong

Cycling career
- Sport: Cycling
- Discipline: Road
- Role: Rider

Professional team
- 2014–2022: HKSI Pro Cycling Team

Ho Burr (Chinese: 何柏爾; born 23 September 1992) is a Hong Kong cyclist, who most recently rode for UCI Continental team HKSI Pro Cycling Team.

== Major results ==
2012
1st Stage 3 Tour de East Java
Asian Under-23 Road Championships

3rd Time trial
4th Road race

2013
National Road Championships

1st Under-23 road race
2nd Road race

2014
2nd Time trial, National Under-23 Road Championships
4th Overall Jelajah Malaysia

1st Asian rider classification

2015
National Road Championships

3rd Road race
3rd Time trial

2016
3rd Road race, National Road Championships
2017
Asian Road Championships

3rd Team time trial
5th Road race

3rd Road race, National Road Championships
2018
National Road Championships

1st Time trial
3rd Road race

Asian Road Championships

3rd Team time trial
4th Road race

2020
9th Overall Cambodia Bay Cycling Tour
