= Hervé Dagorné =

French cyclist (born 1967)

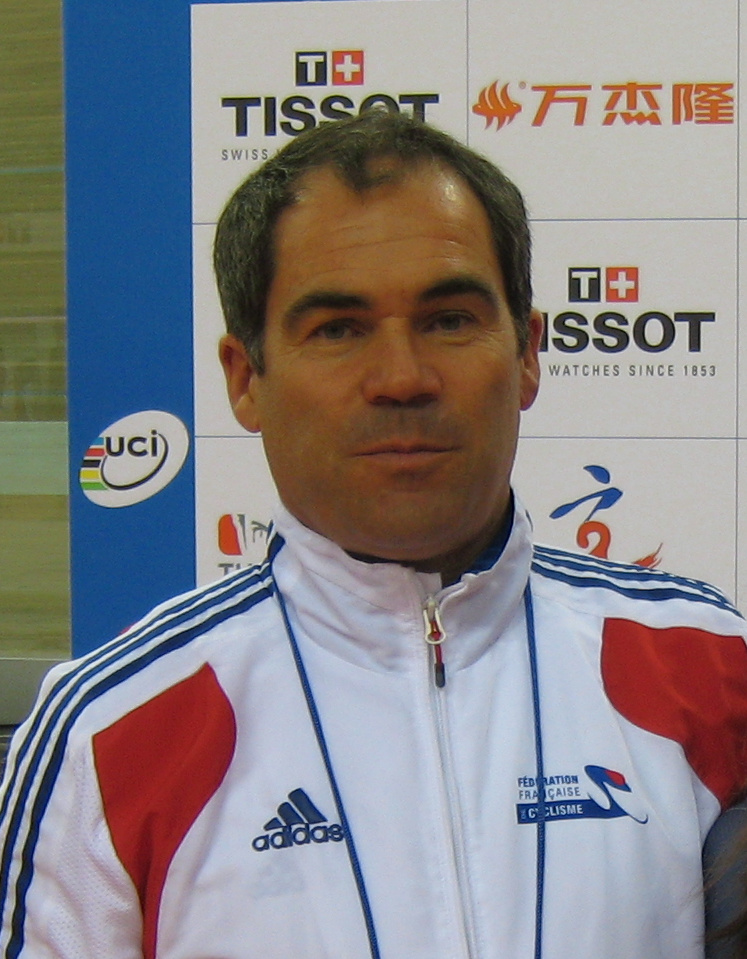

Personal information
- Born: 30 January 1967 (age 59) L'Haÿ-les-Roses, France

Cycling career
- Sport: Cycling
- Current team: HKSI Pro Cycling Team
- Discipline: Road
- Role: Rider (retired); Directeur sportif

Managerial team
- 2019–: HKSI Pro Cycling Team

Hervé Dagorné (born 30 January 1967) is a French former cyclist who currently works as a directeur sportif for the UCI Continental team HKSI Pro Cycling Team. He competed at the 1988 Summer Olympics and the 1992 Summer Olympics.
