= Jupha Somnet =

Malaysian cyclist

Personal information
- Born: 26 April 1993 (age 33) Perlis, Malaysia
- Height: 5 ft 6 in (1.68 m)

Cycling career
- Sport: Cycling
- Disciplines: Track; Road
- Role: Rider

Major wins
- One-day races and Classics National Road Race Championships (2012,2019)
Medal record
Women's track cycling
Representing Malaysia
Asian Championships
Gold medal – first place	2018 Nilai	Points race
Silver medal – second place	2016 Izu	Points race
Bronze medal – third place	2016 Izu	Scratch
Bronze medal – third place	2014 Astana	Points race
Bronze medal – third place	2014 New Delhi	Points race
Southeast Asian Games
Gold medal – first place	2011 Palembang	Team sprint
Silver medal – second place	2017 Kuala Lumpur	Women's criterium
Silver medal – second place	2017 Kuala Lumpur	Women's road race
Bronze medal – third place	2017 Kuala Lumpur	Women's Omnium
Bronze medal – third place	2015 Singapore	Criterium

Jupha Somnet (Thai: ยุพา สมเนตร, RTGS: Yupha Somnet; born 26 April 1993) is a Malaysian road and track cyclist. She won the silver medal in the points race and the bronze medal in the scratch at the 2016 Asian Cycling Championships.

== Early life ==
Jupha is the fourth of five siblings growing up in Chuping, Perlis. Jupha was surrounded by people who were into sports. Her aunt was the assistant to coach Muhammad Affendy who coached the Perlis Cycling Team. When she was 14 years old, Jupha moved to Sekolah Sukan Bandar Penawar where she took the sport seriously. Jupha finished her studies at Bukit Jalil Sports School.

== Major results ==
2010
Asian Junior Track Championships

2nd 500m time trial
2nd Team sprint
3rd Scratch
3rd Sprint

2011
1st Team sprint, Southeast Asian Games
Asian Junior Track Championships

2nd 500m time trial
2nd Scratch
2nd Team pursuit
2nd Team sprint
3rd Keirin

2012
1st Road race, National Road Championships
2013
1st Scratch, ACC Track Asia Cup, Thailand
2nd Time trial, National Road Championships
3rd Points race, Asian Track Championships
2014
2nd Omnium, Japan Track Cup 2
2nd Omnium, South East Asian GP Track (1)
2nd Points race, South East Asian GP Track (2)
Track Clubs ACC Cup

2nd Omnium
3rd Keirin
3rd Points race

3rd Points race, Asian Track Championships
3rd Omnium, South East Asian GP Track (3)
2015
1st Omnium, South East Asian GP Track (1)
1st Omnium, South East Asian GP Track (2)
3rd Criterium, Southeast Asian Games
2016
Asian Track Championships

2nd Points race
3rd Scratch

3rd Omnium, Taiwan Hsin-Chu Track International Classic
2017
1st Scratch, Taiwan Cup Track International Classic II
Southeast Asian Games

2nd Criterium
2nd Road race
3rd Omnium

2018
1st Points race, Asian Track Championships
2019
1st Road race, National Road Championships
2nd China Scenic Avenue I
4th Road race, Southeast Asian Games
2021
2nd Team road race, Southeast Asian Games
2nd Road race, National Road Championships

== Honours ==
- Malaysia
  - Recipient of the General Service Medal (PPA)
- Royal Malaysia Police
  - Herald of the Most Gallant Police Order (BPP) (2020)
