= Leung Bo Yee =

Hong Kong cyclist (born 1993)

Personal information
- Born: 21 November 1993 (age 32) Hong Kong

Cycling career
- Sport: Cycling
- Disciplines: Road; Track
- Role: Rider

Professional team
- 2021: China Liv Pro Cycling
Medal record
Representing Hong Kong
Women's track cycling
Asian Games
Bronze medal – third place	2022 Hangzhou	Team pursuit
Asian Championships
Silver medal – second place	2015 Nakhon Ratchasima	Team pursuit
Silver medal – second place	2017 New Delhi	Team pursuit
Silver medal – second place	2020 Jincheon	Individual pursuit
Bronze medal – third place	2020 Jincheon	Points race
Bronze medal – third place	2024 New Delhi	Points race
Bronze medal – third place	2024 New Delhi	Madison
Bronze medal – third place	2025 Nilai	Team pursuit
Bronze medal – third place	2026 Tagaytay	Team pursuit
Women's road bicycle racing
Asian Championships
Bronze medal – third place	2024 Almaty	Mixed team relay

Leung Bo Yee (born 21 November 1993) is a Hong Kong road and track cyclist, who most recently rode for UCI Women's Continental Team China Liv Pro Cycling. She represented her nation at the 2015 UCI Track Cycling World Championships, and in the Madison at the 2020 Summer Olympics.

== Major results ==
2010
3rd Individual pursuit, Asian Junior Cycling Championships
2011
Asian Junior Cycling Championships

1st Road race
2nd Time trial
3rd Individual pursuit

2012
2nd Road race, National Road Championships
5th Time trial, Asian Road Championships
2013
6th Overall Tour of Thailand
2014
Track Clubs ACC Cup

1st Scratch
2nd Points race

Hong Kong International Track Cup

2nd Individual pursuit
3rd Scratch

3rd Road race, National Road Championships
2015
2nd Team pursuit, Asian Track Championships (with Meng Zhaojuan, Pang Yao and Yang Qianyu)
3rd Time trial, National Road Championships
2016
1st Team pursuit, Track Clubs ACC Cup (with Leung Wing Yee, Pang Yao and Yang Qianyu)
1st Team pursuit, Track Asia Cup (with Leung Wing Yee, Pang Yao and Meng Zhaojuan)
National Road Championships

2nd Time trial
3rd Road race

2017
2nd Team pursuit, Asian Track Championships (with Diao Xiaojuan, Pang Yao and Yang Qianyu)
2nd Time trial, National Road Championships
2019
2020 Asian Track Cycling Championships

2nd Individual pursuit
3rd Points race
