= Sultanmurat Miraliyev =

Kazakhstani cyclist (born 1990)

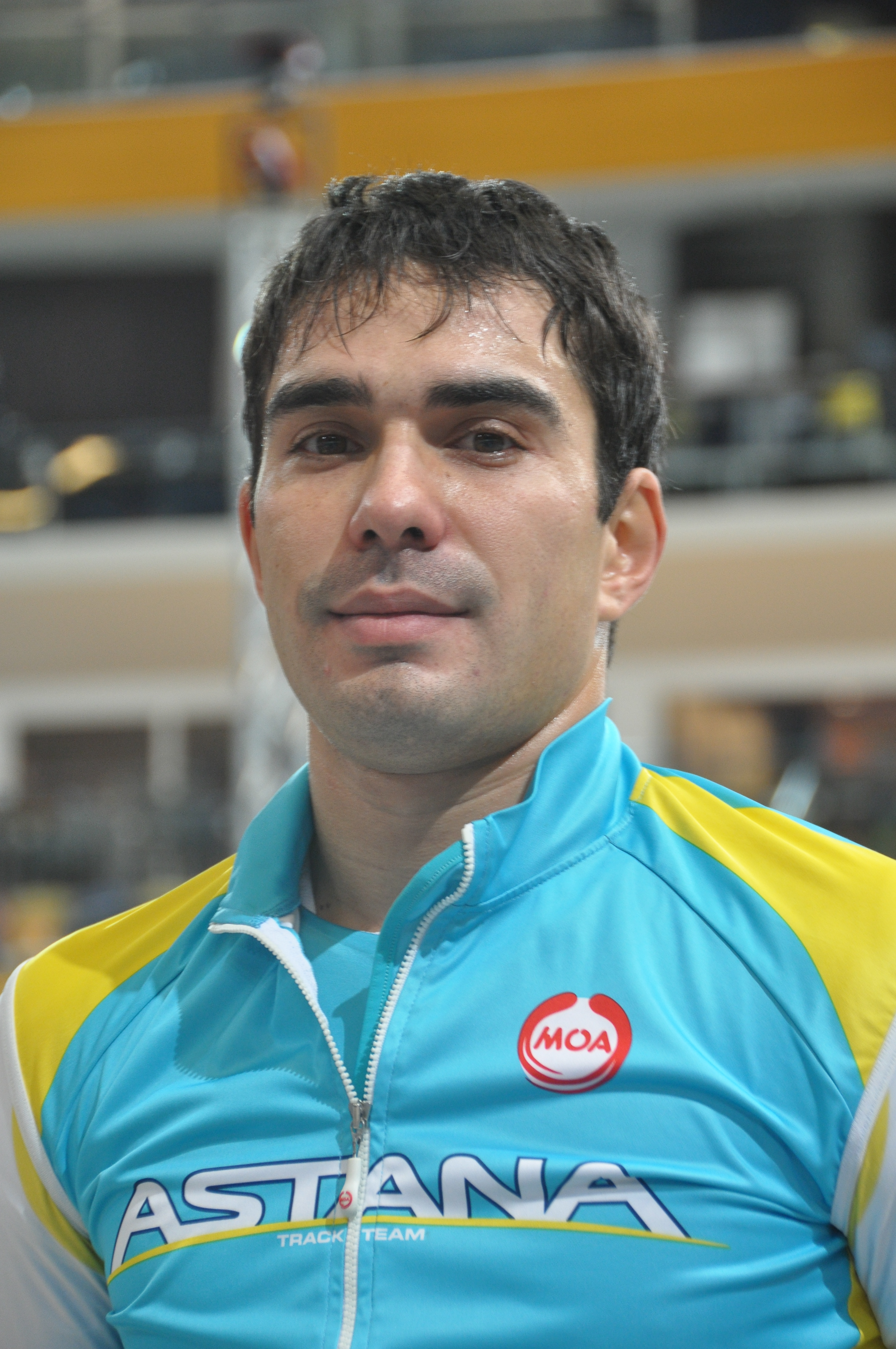
- Miraliyev in 2016

Personal information
- Full name: Sultanmurat Khayimatovich Miraliyev
- Born: 13 October 1990 (age 36): Astana, Kazakhstan

Cycling career
- Sport: Cycling
- Current team: Almaty Continental Team
- Disciplines: Track; Road

Professional teams
- 2016: Astana City
- 2018: RTS Racing Team
- 2019–: Apple Team

Sultanmurat Khayimatovich Miraliyev (Russian: Султанмурат Хайитматович Миралиев; born 13 October 1990) is a Kazakhstani road and track cyclist, who currently rides for UCI Continental team Almaty Continental Team. Representing Kazakhstan at international competitions, Miraliyev won the bronze medal at the 2016–17 UCI Track Cycling World Cup, Round 2 in Apeldoorn in the points race.

== Major results ==
=== Track ===
2015
1st Madison, National Track Championships (with Dias Omirzakov)
2016
National Track Championships

1st Individual pursuit
1st Points race
1st Scratch
1st Madison (with Dias Omirzakov)

UCI World Cup

3rd Points race, Apeldoorn

2017
Asian Track Championships

1st Omnium
2nd Madison (with Artyom Zakharov)

2018
1st Omnium, National Track Championships
2020
National Track Championships

1st Individual pursuit
1st Team pursuit

2021
National Track Championships

1st Omnium
1st Madison (with Andrey Betts)

=== Road ===
2016
4th Time trial, National Road Championships
2022
8th Grand Prix Justiniano Hotels
8th Grand Prix Megasaray
