= Hong Kong National Time Trial Championships =

National road cycling championship in Hong Kong

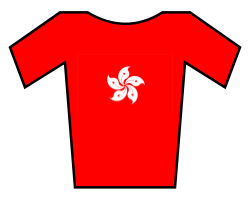
- The champion's jersey

Race details
- Date: June
- Discipline: Road
- Type: One-day race

History (men)
- First edition: 1999
- Editions: 13 (as of 2022)
- First winner: Wong Kam-po
- Most wins: Cheung King Lok (4 wins)
- Most recent: Lau Wan Yau

History (women)
- First edition: 1999
- Editions: 10 (as of 2022)
- First winner: Alexandra Yeung
- Most wins: Jamie Wong (3 wins)
- Most recent: Kong Lam

The Hong Kong National Time Trial Championships are held annually to decide the cycling champions in the time trial discipline, across various categories.

== Men ==
Year	Winner	Second	Third
1999	Wong Kam-po	Eric Sutherland	Wong Kin Chung
2000	Tsoi Chun Ming	Chung Yuet Shan	Chiu Siu Jun
2001	Ho Siu Lun	Leung Chi Yin	Chung Yuet Shan
2002	David John Tonks	Chiu Siu Jun	Chung Yuet Shan
2003– 2006	Not held		
2007	Tang Wang Yip	Chan Chun Hing	Kai Tsun Lam
2008– 2012	Not held		
2013	Choi Ki Ho	Cheung King Lok	Kwok Ho Ting
2014	Cheung King Lok	Cheung King Wai	David John Tonks
2015	Cheung King Lok	Leung Chun Wing	Ho Burr
2016	Cheung King Lok	Fung Ka Hoo	Mow Ching Yin
2017	Cheung King Lok	Fred Clatworthy	Ronald Yeung
2018	Ho Burr	Ko Siu Wai	Lau Wan Yau
2019	Fung Ka Hoo	Leung Chun Wing	Leung Ka Yu
2020– 2021	Not held due to the COVID-19 pandemic in Hong Kong		
2022	Lau Wan Yau	Ko Siu Wai	Ng Pak Hang

== Women ==
Year	Winner	Second	Third
1999	Alexandra Yeung		
2000– 2006	Not held		
2007	Jamie Wong	Leung Bo Yee	Lau Oi Man
2008– 2012	Not held		
2013	Jamie Wong	Leung Bo Yee	Yang Qianyu
2014	Jamie Wong	Pang Yao	Yang Qianyu
2015	Pang Yao	Yang Qianyu	Leung Bo Yee
2016	Yang Qianyu	Leung Bo Yee	Leung Wing Yee
2017	Pang Yao	Leung Bo Yee	Fung Wing Yee
2018	Yang Qianyu	Pang Yao	Fung Wing Yee
2019	Leung Wing Yee	Yang Qianyu	Pang Yao
2020– 2021	Not held due to the COVID-19 pandemic in Hong Kong		
2022	Kong Lam	Leung Kit Yee	Ma Yin Yu
