= Hong Kong National Road Race Championships =

National road cycling championship in Hong Kong

The Hong Kong National Road Race Championships are held annually to decide the cycling champions in the road race discipline, across various categories.

== Men ==
Hong Kong National Road Race Championships – Men's road race
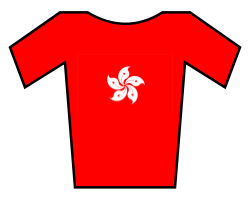
- The champion's jersey

Race details
- Date: June
- Discipline: Road
- Type: One-day race

History
- First edition: 1999
- Editions: 18 (as of 2022)
- First winner: Wong Kam-po
- Most wins: Cheung King Lok (3 wins)
- Most recent: Lau Wan Yau Vincent

Year	Winner	Second	Third
1999	Wong Kam-po	Leung Chi Hang	Ho Siu Lun
2000	Wong Kam-po	Ho Siu Lun	Wong Ngai Ching
2001	Kan Koon Hang	Cheng Cheuk Chun	Chung Yuet Shan
2002	Kan Koon Hang	Wei Chan Wang	Hung Chung Yam
2004 (Note: The race was won on the road by British rider David Tonks.)	Chiu Hang Leung	Wai Lok Yung	Tang Wang Yip
2006	Jing Wei Zhang	Jin Bao Huang	Hong Ye Zheng
2007	Wu Kin San	Cheung King Wai	Kai Tsun Lam
2010	Tang Wang Yip	Chau Dor Ming	Ronald Yeung
2011 (Note: The race was won on the road by Choi Ki Ho, but he was not eligible for the elite honours.)	Ronald Yeung	Wong Kam-po	Kwok Ho Ting
2012	Kwok Ho Ting	Cheung King Wai	Choi Ki Ho
2013	Cheung King Wai	Ho Burr	Cheung King Lok
2014	Cheung King Lok	Ronald Yeung	Cheung King Wai
2015	Ko Siu Wai	Leung Chun Wing	Ho Burr
2016	Cheung King Lok	Mow Ching Yin	Ho Burr
2017	Leung Chun Wing	Ko Siu Wai	Ho Burr
2018	Ko Siu Wai	Vincent Lau Wan-yau	Ho Burr
2019	Cheung King Lok	Fung Ka Hoo	Leung Ka Yu
2020– 2021	Not held due to the COVID-19 pandemic in Hong Kong
2022	Vincent Lau Wan-yau	Ng Pak Hang	Cheng Wang-hin
2023	Ng Pak-hang	Mow Ching Yin	Lo Chun-kit
2024	Mow Ching Yin	Ng Sum-lui	Victor Lau Wan-hei

== Women ==
Hong Kong National Road Race Championships – Women's road race
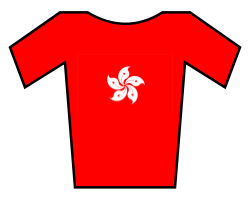
- The champion's jersey

Race details
- Date: June
- Discipline: Road
- Type: One-day race

History
- First edition: 1999
- Editions: 13 (as of 2022)
- First winner: Alexandra Yeung
- Most wins: Jamie Wong; Meng Zhaojuan; (3 wins)
- Most recent: Lam Kong

Year	Winner	Second	Third
1999	Alexandra Yeung
2000	Alexandra Yeung
2010	Ho Sau Yee	Lee Pui Sze
2011	Jamie Wong	Leung Bo Yee	Meng Zhaojuan
2012	Jamie Wong	Leung Bo Yee	Ho Sau Yee
2013	Jamie Wong	Yang Qianyu	Meng Zhaojuan
2014	Meng Zhaojuan	Yang Qianyu	Leung Bo Yee
2015	Meng Zhaojuan	Yang Qianyu	Pang Yao
2016	Meng Zhaojuan	Yang Qianyu	Leung Bo Yee
2017	Yang Qianyu	Pang Yao	Leung Wing Yee
2018	Pang Yao	Yang Qianyu	Leung Kit Yee
2019	Yang Qianyu	Pang Yao	Leung Wing Yee
2020– 2021	Not held due to the COVID-19 pandemic in Hong Kong
2022	Lam Kong	Tsang Hiu Tung	Leung Kit Yee
2023
2024	Lee Sze Wing	Guardiola Cheung Li-tong	Leung Wing Yee
