= Leung Chun Wing =

Hong Kong cyclist (born 1994)

Leung Chun Wing MH
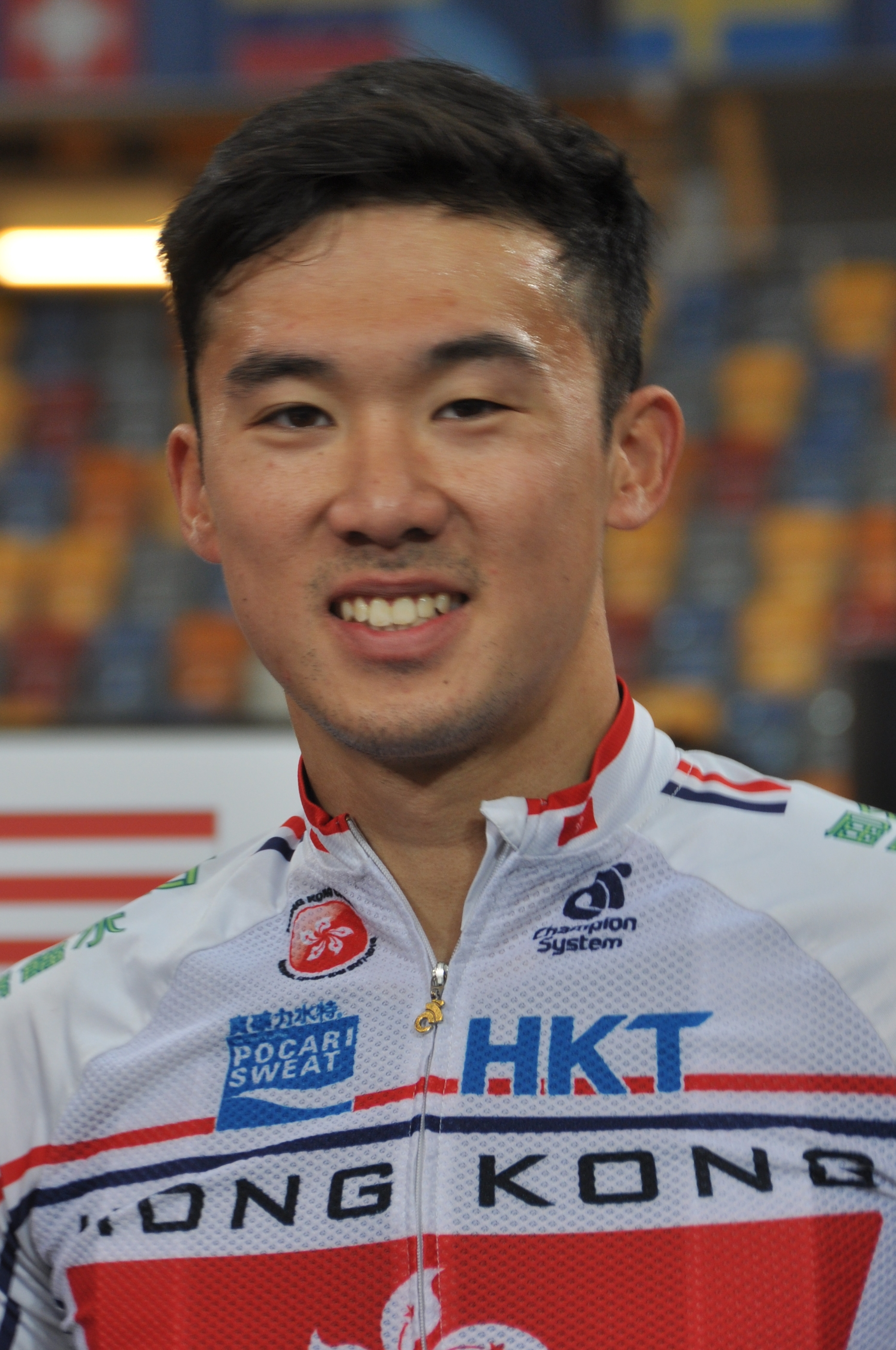
- Leung at the 2018 UCI Track Cycling World Championships

Personal information
- Full name: Leung Chun Wing
- Born: 20 January 1994 (age 32)

Cycling career
- Sport: Cycling
- Current team: HKSI Pro Cycling Team
- Disciplines: Road; Track
- Role: Rider

Professional team
- 2014–: HKSI Pro Cycling Team
Medal record
Representing Hong Kong
Men's track cycling
Asian Championships
Gold medal – first place	2014 Astana	Madison
Gold medal – first place	2015 Nakhon Ratchasima	Madison
Gold medal – first place	2017 New Delhi	Scratch
Gold medal – first place	2018 Nilai	Madison
Silver medal – second place	2014 Astana	Team pursuit
Silver medal – second place	2016 Izu	Madison
Silver medal – second place	2017 New Delhi	Omnium
Silver medal – second place	2023 Nilai	Madison
Bronze medal – third place	2013 New Delhi	Team pursuit
Bronze medal – third place	2020 Jincheon	Team pursuit
Bronze medal – third place	2023 Nilai	Elimination
Men's road bicycle racing
Asian Championships
Bronze medal – third place	2017 Manama	Team time trial
Bronze medal – third place	2018 Naypyidaw	Team time trial
Bronze medal – third place	2019 Tashkent	Team time trial
Asian Games
Bronze medal – third place	2014 Incheon	Road race

Leung Chun Wing MH (born 20 January 1994) is a Hong Kong professional racing cyclist, who rides for UCI Continental team HKSI Pro Cycling Team. He rode at the 2015 UCI Track Cycling World Championships. He also competed in road race events at the 2014 Asian Games and won the bronze medal.

== Major results ==
=== Road ===
2011
2nd Time trial, Asian Junior Road Championships
2nd Road race, National Junior Road Championships
2012
Asian Junior Road Championships

1st Time trial
3rd Road race

2014
1st Time trial, National Under-23 Road Championships
3rd Road race, Asian Games
Asian Under-23 Road Championships

3rd Time trial
4th Road race

2015
National Road Championships

1st Under-23 road race
1st Under-23 time trial
2nd Road race
2nd Time trial

1st Stage 4 Tour de Ijen
4th Road race, Asian Road Championships
2017
National Road Championships

1st Road race
1st Time trial

Asian Road Championships

3rd Team time trial
8th Road race

2018
3rd Team time trial, Asian Road Championships
2019
2nd Time trial, National Road Championships
3rd Team time trial, Asian Road Championships

=== Track ===
2012
1st Points race, UCI Juniors Track World Championships
2013
3rd Team pursuit, Asian Track Championships
2014
Asian Track Championships

1st Madison (with Cheung King Lok)
2nd Team pursuit

2015
1st Madison, Asian Track Championships (with Cheung King Lok)
2016
2nd Madison, Asian Track Championships (with Cheung King Lok)
2017
Asian Indoor and Martial Arts Games

1st Omnium
2nd Team pursuit

Asian Track Championships

1st Scratch
2nd Omnium

2018
1st Madison, 2017–18 UCI Track Cycling World Cup, Minsk (with Cheung King Lok)
Asian Games

1st Madison (with Cheung King Lok)
2nd Omnium
2nd Team pursuit

1st Madison, Asian Track Championships (with Cheung King Lok)
2019
3rd Team pursuit, 2020 Asian Track Cycling Championships
