= Jin Long (cyclist) =

Chinese cyclist

Personal information
- Full name: Jin Long; Chinese: 金龙
- Born: 23 October 1983 (age 42)

Cycling career
- Sport: Cycling
- Current team: Retired
- Discipline: Road
- Role: Rider

Professional teams
- 2006–2010: Skil–Shimano
- 2011: Holy Brother
- 2014: China 361° Cycling Team

Managerial team
- 2016–: HKSI Pro Cycling Team

Jin Long (Chinese: 金龙; born 23 October 1983) is a former Chinese professional cyclist.

In 2009, he became the first Chinese cyclist to compete in Paris–Roubaix, though he did not finish the race.
