= Son Hee-jung =

South Korean cyclist

Personal information
- Full name: Son Hee-jung
- Born: 6 July 1987 (age 39)
- Height: 1.65 m (5 ft 5 in)
- Weight: 55 kg (121 lb)

Cycling career
- Sport: Cycling
- Disciplines: Road, track
- Role: Rider
Medal record
Representing South Korea
Women's road cycling
Universiade
Silver medal – second place	2011 Shenzhen	Road race
Silver medal – second place	2011 Shenzhen	Team time trial
Women's track cycling
Asian Championships
Gold medal – first place	2013 New Delhi	Team pursuit

Son Hee-jung (also Son Hui-jeong, Korean: 손희정; born July 6, 1987) is a South Korean amateur road and track cyclist. She represented her nation South Korea at the 2008 Summer Olympics, and later helped the South Koreans capture the women's team pursuit title at the |2013 Asian Cycling Championships.

Son qualified for the South Korean squad in the women's road race at the 2008 Summer Olympics in Beijing by receiving a single berth from the defunct UCI B World Championships. Passing through a three-hour limit and a 102.6-km mark, Son fell to the ground after a heavy collision with six other cyclists and did not finish the race.

At the 2011 Summer Universiade in Shenzhen, Son joined her teammate Gu Sun-Geun to stand on the podium, as she handed the South Koreans a 1–2 finish with a silver medal time in 3:31:42.

Two years later, at the 2013 Asian Cycling Championships in New Delhi, Son and her South Korean squad (led by 2012 Olympian Lee Min-Hye) posted a time of 4:41.500 to defeat Japan for the gold medal in the final match of the women's 4 km team pursuit.

== Major results ==
2011
(silver) Universiade (Road), Shenzhen (CHN)
(silver) Universiade (TTT), Shenzhen (CHN)
2013
(gold) Asian Championships (Track – Team pursuit), New Delhi (IND)
2014
3rd Team Pursuit, Asian Games (with Lee Chaek-Yung, Lee Ju-mi, Lee Min-hye, Na Ah-reum and Yu-ri Kim)
