= Zhang Liang (cyclist) =

Chinese cyclist

Personal information
- Born: March 1, 1983 (age 43) Ningxia, China

Cycling career
- Sport: Cycling
- Discipline: Racing
- Role: Rider

Professional teams
- 1998: Ningxia Regional Cycling Team
- 2003-2004: National Cycling Team
- 2006-2007: National Team for Intensified Training
- 2008: Chinese Olympic Cycling Team

Zhang Liang (born March 1, 1983 in Ningxia) is a Chinese Olympic racing cyclist, who competed for China at the 2008 Summer Olympics.

== Sports career ==
- 1998 Taole County Sports Commission/Ningxia Regional Cycling Team;
- 2003-2004 National Cycling Team;
- 2006/2007 National Team for Intensified Training

== Major performances ==
- 2000 Asian Junior Championships - 3rd track 4 km team pursuit;
- 2003/2007 Road National Champions Tournament - 3rd individual 180 km road;
- 2004/2006 Road National Champions Tournament - 2nd individual 180 km road
