= Mow Ching Yin =

Hong Kong cyclist

Personal information
- Born: 5 June 1995 (age 31)

Cycling career
- Sport: Cycling
- Current team: HKSI Pro Cycling Team
- Disciplines: Road; Track
- Role: Rider

Professional team
- 2014–: HKSI Pro Cycling Team
Medal record
Representing Hong Kong
Men's track cycling
Asian Games
Silver medal – second place	2018 Jakarta	Team pursuit
Asian Championships
Gold medal – first place	2020 Jincheon	Scratch
Bronze medal – third place	2020 Jincheon	Team pursuit
Bronze medal – third place	2023 Nilai	Points race
Bronze medal – third place	2024 New Delhi	Points race
Bronze medal – third place	2025 Nilai	Points race
Men's road bicycle racing
Asian Championships
Bronze medal – third place	2025 Phitsanulok	Mixed team relay

Mow Ching Yin (Chinese: 繆正賢; born 5 June 1995) is a Hong Kong road and track cyclist, who currently rides for UCI Continental team HKSI Pro Cycling Team.

== Major results ==
2014
2nd Road race, National Junior Road Championships
2015
National Under-23 Road Championships

2nd Road race
3rd Time trial

5th Road race, National Road Championships
2016
National Road Championships

2nd Road race
3rd Time trial

2nd Time trial, National Under-23 Road Championships
2017
1st Points race, National Track Championships
2nd Time trial, National Under-23 Road Championships
3rd Team time trial, Asian Road Championships
2018
2nd Team pursuit, Asian Games
3rd Team time trial, Asian Road Championships
4th Time trial, National Road Championships
2019
3rd Team time trial, Asian Road Championships
4th Time trial, National Road Championships
