= Mariya Slokotovich =

Kazakhstani cyclist

Personal information
- Born: 16 January 1989 (age 37) Kazakhstan

Cycling career
- Sport: Cycling
- Discipline: Road cycling

Professional team
- 2008-2009: Petrogradets

Mariya Slokotovich (born 16 January 1989) is a road cyclist from Kazakhstan. She represented her nation at the 2008 UCI Road World Championships.
