= 2019 Asian Road Cycling Championships =

- Venue: Tashkent, Uzbekistan
- Date(s): 23–28 April 2019

The 2019 Asian Road Cycling Championships was held in Tashkent, Uzbekistan from 23 to 28 April 2019.

== Medal summary ==
=== Men ===
Event	Gold	Silver	Bronze
Individual road race	Yevgeniy Gidich; Kazakhstan	Lü Xianjing; China	Feng Chun-kai; Chinese Taipei
Individual time trial	Daniil Fominykh; Kazakhstan	Feng Chun-kai; Chinese Taipei	Cheung King Lok; Hong Kong
Team time trial	Kazakhstan; Artyom Zakharov; Dmitriy Gruzdev; Zhandos Bizhigitov; Yuriy Natarov; Daniil Fominykh; Yevgeniy Gidich	South Korea; Joo Dae-yeong; Kim Kook-hyun; Min Kyeong-ho; Choe Hyeong-min; Park Sang-hoon; Park Sang-hong	Hong Kong; Mow Ching Yin; Leung Chun Wing; Leung Ka Yu; Ko Siu Wai

=== Women ===
Event	Gold	Silver	Bronze
Individual road race	Olga Zabelinskaya; Uzbekistan	Na Ah-reum; South Korea	Somayyeh Yazdani; Iran
Individual time trial	Olga Zabelinskaya; Uzbekistan	Lee Ju-mi; South Korea	Huang Ting-ying; Chinese Taipei
Team time trial	South Korea; Yu Seon-ha; Lee Ju-mi; Kang Hyeong-yeong; Na Ah-reum	Kazakhstan; Natalya Saifutdinova; Zhanerke Sanakbayeva; Makhabbat Umutzhanova; Amiliya Iskakova; Viktoriya Pastarnak; Faina Potapova	Hong Kong; Ma Yin Yu; Pang Yao; Leung Hoi Wah; Leung Wing Yee; Yang Qianyu; Ng Sze Wing

== Medal table ==
Rank	Nation	Gold	Silver	Bronze	Total
1	Kazakhstan	3	1	0	4
2	Uzbekistan	2	0	0	2
3	South Korea	1	3	0	4
4	Chinese Taipei	0	1	2	3
5	China	0	1	0	1
6	Hong Kong	0	0	3	3
7	Iran	0	0	1	1
Totals (7 entries)		6	6	6	18
