= Dias Omirzakov =

Kazakhstani cyclist (born 1992)

Personal information
- Born: 13 July 1992 (age 34) Shymkent, Kazakhstan

Cycling career
- Sport: Cycling
- Disciplines: Road; Track
- Role: Rider

Professional team
- 2016: Astana
Medal record
Representing Kazakhstan
Men's track cycling
Asian Championships
Silver medal – second place	2013 New Delhi	Individual pursuit
Silver medal – second place	2016 Izu	Individual pursuit
Bronze medal – third place	2012 Kuala Lumpur	Team pursuit

Dias Omirzakov (born 13 July 1992) is a Kazakhstani cyclist. He won the silver medal in the individual pursuit at the 2016 Asian Cycling Championships.

== Major results ==
=== Road ===
2011
6th Overall Tour of Thailand

1st Stage 5

2012
1st Stage 4 Tour of Vietnam
2014
1st Stage 7 Tour of Guiana

=== Track ===
2012
3rd Team pursuit, Asian Track Championships
2013
2nd Individual pursuit, Asian Track Championships
2015
1st Madison, National Track Championships (with Sultanmurat Miraliyev)
2016
1st Madison, National Track Championships (with Sultanmurat Miraliyev)
2nd Individual pursuit, Asian Track Championships
