= Shugo Hayasaka =

Japanese track and keirin cyclist (born 1986)

Personal information
- Born: 22 January 1986 (age 40)

Cycling career
- Sport: Cycling
- Discipline: Track cycling
- Role: Rider
Medal record
Men's track cycling
Representing Japan
Asian Championships
Silver medal – second place	2016 Izu	1km time trial

Shugo Hayasaka (早坂 秀悟, Hayasaka Shūgo; born 22 January 1986) is a Japanese male track cyclist and professional keirin cyclist. He won the silver medal in the 1 km time trial at the 2016 Asian Cycling Championships.
