= Choe Hyeong-min =

South Korean bicycle racer

Personal information
- Born: 15 April 1990 (age 36) South Korea

Korean name
- Hangul: 최형민
- RR: Choe Hyeongmin
- MR: Ch'oe Hyŏngmin

Sport
- Cycling career
- Full name: Choe Hyeong-min
- Sport: Cycling
- Discipline: Road
- Role: Rider
- Rider type: Time trialist

Professional team
- 2010–2020: Geumsan Ginseng Asia

Major wins
- One-day races and Classics National Time Trial Championships (2016–2019)
Medal record
Representing South Korea
Men's road bicycle racing
Asian Games
Gold medal – first place	2010 Guangzhou	Individual time trial
Asian Cycling Championships
Silver medal – second place	2019 Tashkent	Team time trial
Silver medal – second place	2018 Nilai	Individual time trial
Silver medal – second place	2017 New Delhi	Individual time trial
Silver medal – second place	2016 Izu	Individual time trial
Bronze medal – third place	2015 Nakhon Ratchasima	Individual time trial
Bronze medal – third place	2014 Astana	Individual time trial
Gold medal – first place	2008 Nara	Junior road race
Bronze medal – third place	2008 Nara	Junior time trial
Men's track cycling
Gold medal – first place	2010 Sharjah	Scratch

Choe Hyeong-min (born 15 April 1990) is a South Korean cyclist, who most recently rode for UCI Continental team Geumsan Insam Cello.

== Major results ==
2008
Asian Junior Road Championships

1st Road race
3rd Time trial

2010
1st Time trial, Asian Games
1st Scratch, Asian Track Championships
2011
1st Time trial, National Road Championships
2012
9th Road race, National Road Championships
2013
1st Mountains classification Tour de Korea
2014
2nd Overall Tour de Korea
3rd Time trial, Asian Road Championships
2015
3rd Time trial, Asian Road Championships
9th Overall Tour de Taiwan
2016
1st Time trial, National Road Championships
1st Mountains classification Tour de Korea
2nd Time trial, Asian Road Championships
9th Overall Tour de Flores
2017
1st Time trial, National Road Championships
2nd Time trial, Asian Road Championships
2018
1st Time trial, National Road Championships
1st Stage 1 Tour de Korea
2nd Time trial, Asian Road Championships
4th Time trial, Asian Games
2019
National Road Championships

1st Time trial
4th Road race

Asian Road Championships

2nd Team time trial
5th Time trial

9th Overall Tour de Korea
2020
1st Time trial, National Road Championships
2022
2nd Time trial, National Road Championships
