= Viktoriya Pastarnak =

Kazakhstani cyclist

Personal information
- Born: 31 August 1997 (age 29)

Cycling career
- Sport: Cycling
- Role: Rider

Viktoriya Pastarnak (born 31 August 1997) is a Kazakhstani professional racing cyclist who rides for Astana Women's Team.

== See also ==
- List of 2016 UCI Women's Teams and riders
