= Wu Lok Chun =

Hong Kong cyclist

Personal information
- Born: 18 July 1993 (age 33)

Cycling career
- Sport: Cycling
- Role: Rider

Wu Lok Chun (born 18 July 1993) is a Hong Kong professional racing cyclist. He rode at the 2015 UCI Track Cycling World Championships. He also participated at the 2014 Asian Games.
