= Choi Ki Ho =

Hong Kong cyclist

Choi Ki-Ho
Personal information
- Full name: Choi Ki-Ho
- Born: 5 May 1991 (age 35) Hong Kong
- Height: 1.73 m (5 ft 8 in)
- Weight: 59 kg (130 lb)

Cycling career
- Sport: Cycling
- Current team: Retired
- Disciplines: Track, road
- Role: Rider

Amateur teams
- 2010: Centre Mondial du Cyclisme
- 2012: Hong Kong Pro Cycling Team
- 2013: Team Hong Kong China

Major wins
- Tour de Korea (2011)
Medal record
Men's track cycling
Representing Hong Kong
Asian Games
Silver medal – second place	2010 Guangzhou	Team pursuit

Choi Ki Ho (Chinese: 蔡其皓; Jyutping: coi^{3} kei^{4} hou^{6}; born 5 May 1991, in Hong Kong) is a Hong Kong former cyclist.

== Career ==
Choi placed first in the UCI Track Cycling World Cup Classics Madison in Beijing, and won the 2010 Tour de Berne in Aigle, Switzerland. At the 2010 UCI Road World Championships, held in Melbourne, he placed thirty-fourth in the under-23 road race.

He competed for Hong Kong in the men's omnium at the 2012 Summer Olympics.

Choi retired at the end of the 2013 season to pursue business studies.

=== 2011 Tour de Korea ===
Choi Ki Ho won the Tour de Korea at the age of 19 on 24 April 2011, becoming the youngest cyclist to do so. He completed the nine-stage race, a total distance of 1,335.9 kilometers, in a cumulative time of 33 hours 54 minutes 45 seconds.

== Major results ==
2010
1st Tour de Berne
2nd Tour of South China Sea
7th Overall Coupe des Nations Ville Saguenay
10th Overall Tour de Taiwan
2011
1st Road race, National Road Championships
1st Overall Tour de Korea
4th Overall Tour de Singkarak
2012
1st Overall Tour de Ijen

1st Mountains classification
1st Stage 2

1st Overall Tour of Fuzhou

1st Stage 2

1st Stage 1 Tour of Vietnam
3rd Road race, National Road Championships
3rd Overall Tour of Taihu Lake

1st Young rider classification

2013
National Road Championships

1st Time trial
4th Road race

1st Overall Tour of Thailand
