= Cheung King Lok =

Hong Kong cyclist (born 1991)

Cheung King Lok MH
Personal information
- Full name: Cheung King Lok
- Born: 8 February 1991 (age 35) Hong Kong
- Height: 1.72 m (5 ft 8 in)
- Weight: 59 kg (130 lb)

Cycling career
- Sport: Cycling
- Disciplines: Track; Road
- Role: Rider

Amateur team
- 2009–2012: Hong Kong

Professional teams
- 2014–2016: HKSI Pro Cycling Team
- 2016–2017: Orica–GreenEDGE
- 2018–2021: HKSI Pro Cycling Team

Major wins
- One day races & Classics National Road Race Champion (2014, 2016) National Time Trial Champion (2011, 2013–2016)
Medal record
Representing Hong Kong
Men's track cycling
UCI World Championships
Bronze medal – third place	2014 Cali	Scratch
Asian Championships
Gold medal – first place	2014 Astana	Points race
Gold medal – first place	2014 Astana	Madison
Gold medal – first place	2015 Nakhon Ratchasima	Madison
Gold medal – first place	2016 Izu	Individual pursuit
Gold medal – first place	2018 Nilai	Madison
Silver medal – second place	2011 Nakhon Ratchasima	Team pursuit
Silver medal – second place	2012 Kuala Lumpur	Individual pursuit
Silver medal – second place	2012 Kuala Lumpur	Team pursuit
Silver medal – second place	2014 Astana	Team pursuit
Silver medal – second place	2015 Nakhon Ratchasima	Individual pursuit
Silver medal – second place	2016 Izu	Madison
Silver medal – second place	2016 Izu	Points race
Silver medal – second place	2018 Nilai	Points race
Bronze medal – third place	2010 Sharjah	Team pursuit
Bronze medal – third place	2013 New Delhi	Team pursuit
Bronze medal – third place	2014 Astana	Omnium
Bronze medal – third place	2020 Jincheon	Team pursuit
Asian Games
Gold medal – first place	2018 Jakarta	Madison
Silver medal – second place	2010 Guangzhou	Individual pursuit
Silver medal – second place	2010 Guangzhou	Team pursuit
Silver medal – second place	2018 Jakarta	Team pursuit
Bronze medal – third place	2014 Incheon	Omnium
East Asian Games
Silver medal – second place	2013 Tianjin	Individual pursuit
Men's road bicycle racing
Asian Championships
Gold medal – first place	2009 Tenggarong	Junior time trial
Gold medal – first place	2016 Izu	Elite time trial
Gold medal – first place	2016 Izu	Elite road race
Gold medal – first place	2018 Naypyidaw	Elite time trial
Bronze medal – third place	2017 Manama	Elite time trial
Bronze medal – third place	2017 Manama	Team time trial
Bronze medal – third place	2018 Naypyidaw	Team time trial
Bronze medal – third place	2019 Tashkent	Elite time trial

Cheung King Lok MH (Chinese: 張敬樂; born 8 February 1991) is a Hong Kong professional racing cyclist, who most recently rode for UCI Continental team HKSI Pro Cycling Team. He rode at the 2015 UCI Track Cycling World Championships. He competed in the 2010 and 2014 Asian Games and won several medals. He joined Orica–GreenEDGE as a neo-pro in mid-2016, remaining with the team until the end of 2017, before returning to UCI Continental level with HKSI Pro Cycling Team.

== Major results ==
=== Road ===
2009
1st Time trial, Asian Junior Road Championships
2010
1st Stage 10 Tour de Korea
4th Time trial, Asian Road Championships
2011
1st Time trial, Chinese National Road Championships (Note: Cheung King Lok competed for China prior to 2014, so was eligible to race in the 2013 Chinese National Time Trial championships, afterwards, from 2014 to 2016 he represented Hong Kong and as such competed in the Hong Kong National cycling championships, reverting to China in 2017.)
3rd Road race, Hong Kong National Under-23 Road Championships
2012
1st Young rider classification Tour de Kumano
2nd Time trial, Chinese National Road Championships
4th Overall Tour of Taihu Lake
10th Overall Tour of Hainan

1st Stage 6

2013
1st Time trial, Chinese National Road Championships
Hong Kong National Road Championships

2nd Time trial
3rd Road race

2nd Overall Tour de Korea

1st Young rider classification

Asian Under-23 Road Championships

4th Road race
6th Time trial

7th Overall Tour of Thailand
8th Overall Tour of China I
2014
Hong Kong National Road Championships

1st Road race
1st Time trial

2nd Overall Tour of Thailand
6th Time trial, Asian Road Championships
9th Overall Tour de Korea
2015
1st Time trial, Hong Kong National Road Championships
3rd Overall Tour of Thailand
3rd Overall Jelajah Malaysia
7th Overall Tour de Ijen

1st Stage 1

10th Overall Tour of Fuzhou
2016
Asian Road Championships

1st Time trial
1st Road race

Hong Kong National Road Championships

1st Road race
1st Time trial

2017
1st Time trial, Chinese National Road Championships
Asian Road Championships

3rd Time trial
3rd Team time trial

2018
Asian Road Championships

1st Time trial
3rd Team time trial

2019
1st Road race, Hong Kong National Road Championships
3rd Time trial, Asian Road Championships

=== Track ===
2010
Asian Games

2nd Individual pursuit
2nd Team pursuit

3rd Team pursuit, Asian Track Championships
2011
2nd Team pursuit, Asian Track Championships
2012
Asian Track Championships

1st Individual pursuit
2nd Team pursuit

2013
3rd Team pursuit, Asian Track Championships
2014
Asian Track Championships

1st Madison
1st Points race
2nd Team pursuit
3rd Omnium

Hong Kong International Cup

1st Team pursuit
1st Individual pursuit
1st Points race

3rd Scratch, UCI Track World Championships
3rd Omnium, Asian Games
2015
Asian Track Championships

1st Madison
2nd Individual pursuit

1st Points race, 2015–16 UCI Track Cycling World Cup, Cali
2016
Asian Track Championships

1st Individual pursuit
2nd Madison
2nd Points race

2018
Asian Track Championships

1st Madison
2nd Points race
