= Fung Ka Hoo =

Hong Kong cyclist

Personal information
- Full name: Fung Ka Hoo
- Born: 13 August 1997 (age 29) Hong Kong

Cycling career
- Sport: Cycling
- Current team: HKSI Pro Cycling Team
- Discipline: Road
- Role: Rider

Professional team
- 2016–2021: HKSI Pro Cycling Team

Fung Ka Hoo (born 13 August 1997) is a Hong Kong cyclist, who currently rides for UCI Continental team HKSI Pro Cycling Team.

== Major results ==
2013
National Novice Road Championships

1st Road race
1st Time trial

2014
2nd Time trial, National Junior Road Championships
2015
1st Time trial, Asian Junior Road Championships
1st Time trial, National Junior Road Championships
2016
National Road Championships

1st Under-23 time trial
2nd Time trial

2nd Time trial, Asian Under-23 Road Championships
2017
1st Time trial, National Under-23 Road Championships
2nd Overall Tour of Fuzhou
2018
Asian Road Championships

2nd Under-23 time trial
3rd Team time trial

2nd Overall Tour of Quanzhou Bay
2020
3rd Overall Cambodia Bay Cycling Tour
