= 2014 Asian Cycling Championships =

- Venue: Astana, Kazakhstan
- Date: 21 May – 1 June 2014
- Velodrome: Saryarka Velodrome

The 2014 Asian Cycling Championships took place at the Saryarka Velodrome in Astana and Karaganda, Kazakhstan from 21 May to 1 June 2014.

== Medal summary ==
=== Road ===
==== Men ====
Event	Gold	Silver	Bronze
Individual road race	Ruslan Tleubayev; Kazakhstan	Maxim Iglinskiy; Kazakhstan	Dmitriy Gruzdev; Kazakhstan
Individual time trial	Dmitriy Gruzdev; Kazakhstan	Eugen Wacker; Kyrgyzstan	Choe Hyeong-min; South Korea

==== Women ====
Event	Gold	Silver	Bronze
Individual road race	Hsiao Mei-yu; Chinese Taipei	Diao Xiaojuan; Hong Kong	Gu Sung-eun; South Korea
Individual time trial	Na Ah-reum; South Korea	Eri Yonamine; Japan	Tüvshinjargalyn Enkhjargal; Mongolia

=== Track ===
==== Men ====
Event	Gold	Silver	Bronze
Sprint	Azizulhasni Awang; Malaysia	Seiichiro Nakagawa; Japan	Kang Dong-jin; South Korea
1 km time trial	Im Chae-bin; South Korea	Yuta Wakimoto; Japan	Wu Lok Chun; Hong Kong
Keirin	Yuta Wakimoto; Japan	Azizulhasni Awang; Malaysia	Im Chae-bin; South Korea
Individual pursuit	Im Jae-yeon; South Korea	Yuan Zhong; China	Behnam Khosroshahi; Iran
Points race	Cheung King Lok; Hong Kong	Feng Chun-kai; Chinese Taipei	Mohammad Rajabloo; Iran
Scratch	Cho Ho-sung; South Korea	Behnam Khosroshahi; Iran	Feng Chun-kai; Chinese Taipei
Omnium	Liu Hao; China	Eiya Hashimoto; Japan	Cheung King Lok; Hong Kong
Madison	Hong Kong; Cheung King Lok; Leung Chun Wing	Kazakhstan; Nikita Panassenko; Pavel Gatskiy	South Korea; Jang Sun-jae; Park Keon-woo
Team sprint	South Korea; Kang Dong-jin; Im Chae-bin; Son Je-yong	China; Hu Ke; Xu Chao; Bao Saifei	Japan; Seiichiro Nakagawa; Kazunari Watanabe; Yudai Nitta
Team pursuit	China; Shi Tao; Yuan Zhong; Qin Chenlu; Shen Pingan	Hong Kong; Cheung King Wai; Cheung King Lok; Leung Chun Wing; Wu Lok Chun	South Korea; Jang Sun-jae; Park Keon-woo; Park Seon-ho; Cho Ho-sung

==== Women ====
Event	Gold	Silver	Bronze
Sprint	Lin Junhong; China	Zhong Tianshi; China	Lee Wai Sze; Hong Kong
500 m time trial	Lee Wai Sze; Hong Kong	Lee Hye-jin; South Korea	Fatehah Mustapa; Malaysia
Keirin	Lee Wai Sze; Hong Kong	Kim Won-gyeong; South Korea	Zhong Tianshi; China
Individual pursuit	Jing Yali; China	Pang Yao; Hong Kong	Na Ah-reum; South Korea
Points race	Kisato Nakamura; Japan	Chanpeng Nontasin; Thailand	Jupha Somnet; Malaysia
Scratch	Huang Dongyan; China	Yang Qianyu; Hong Kong	Tseng Hsiao-chia; Chinese Taipei
Omnium	Luo Xiaoling; China	Hsiao Mei-yu; Chinese Taipei	Lee Min-hye; South Korea
Team sprint	China; Zhong Tianshi; Lin Junhong	South Korea; Kim Won-gyeong; Lee Hye-jin	Japan; Kayono Maeda; Takako Ishii
Team pursuit	China; Jing Yali; Zhao Baofang; Huang Dongyan; Jiang Wenwen	South Korea; Na Ah-reum; Kim You-ri; Lee Min-hye; Lee Ju-mi	Hong Kong; Yang Qianyu; Pang Yao; Meng Zhaojuan; Jamie Wong

== Medal table ==
Rank	Nation	Gold	Silver	Bronze	Total
1	China	8	3	1	12
2	South Korea	5	4	8	17
3	Hong Kong	4	4	4	12
4	Japan	2	4	2	8
5	Kazakhstan	2	2	1	5
6	Chinese Taipei	1	2	2	5
7	Malaysia	1	1	2	4
8	Iran	0	1	2	3
9	Kyrgyzstan	0	1	0	1
9	Thailand	0	1	0	1
11	Mongolia	0	0	1	1
Totals (11 entries)		23	23	23	69

== Results ==
- Results Men
- Results Women
