= 2013 Asian Cycling Championships =

- Venue: New Delhi, India
- Date: 7–17 March 2013
- Velodrome: Indira Gandhi Stadium Velodrome

The 2013 Asian Cycling Championships took place at the Indira Gandhi Stadium Velodrome in New Delhi, India from 7 to 17 March 2013.

== Medal summary ==
=== Road ===
==== Men ====
Event	Gold	Silver	Bronze
Individual road race	Muradjan Khalmuratov; Uzbekistan	Arvin Moazzami; Iran	Andrey Mizurov; Kazakhstan
Individual time trial	Muradjan Khalmuratov; Uzbekistan	Andrey Mizurov; Kazakhstan	Eugen Wacker; Kyrgyzstan

==== Women ====
Event	Gold	Silver	Bronze
Individual road race	Hsiao Mei-yu; Chinese Taipei	Liu Xiaohui; China	Zhao Na; China
Individual time trial	Tüvshinjargalyn Enkhjargal; Mongolia	Minami Uwano; Japan	Jamie Wong; Hong Kong

=== Track ===
==== Men ====
Event	Gold	Silver	Bronze
Sprint	Josiah Ng; Malaysia	Hassan Ali Varposhti; Iran	Choi Lae-seon; South Korea
1 km time trial	Jun Won-gu; South Korea	Kenta Inake; Japan	Hsiao Shih-hsin; Chinese Taipei
Keirin	Josiah Ng; Malaysia	Mahmoud Parash; Iran	Jun Won-gu; South Korea
Individual pursuit	Jang Sun-jae; South Korea	Dias Omirzakov; Kazakhstan	Alireza Haghi; Iran
Points race	Cho Ho-sung; South Korea	Choi Ki Ho; Hong Kong	Mohammad Rajabloo; Iran
Scratch	Cho Ho-sung; South Korea	Hossein Nateghi; Iran	Liu Chin-feng; Chinese Taipei
Omnium	Artyom Zakharov; Kazakhstan	Shan Shuang; China	Kazushige Kuboki; Japan
Madison	Hong Kong; Choi Ki Ho; Kwok Ho Ting	South Korea; Choi Seung-woo; Jang Sun-jae	Iran; Alireza Haghi; Mohammad Rajabloo
Team sprint	China; Hu Ke; Tang Qi; Xu Chao	Malaysia; Arfy Qhairant; Mohd Edrus Yunus; Farhan Amri Zaid	Japan; Kenta Inake; Takashi Sakamoto; Makuru Wada
Team pursuit	South Korea; Jang Sun-jae; Park Keon-woo; Park Seon-ho; Park Sung-baek	Japan; Eiya Hashimoto; Shogo Ichimaru; Kazuki Ito; Kazushige Kuboki	Hong Kong; Cheung King Lok; Choi Ki Ho; Kwok Ho Ting; Leung Chun Wing

==== Women ====
Event	Gold	Silver	Bronze
Sprint	Fatehah Mustapa; Malaysia	Shi Jingjing; China	Li Xuemei; China
500 m time trial	Lee Wai Sze; Hong Kong	Shi Jingjing; China	Fatehah Mustapa; Malaysia
Keirin	Lee Wai Sze; Hong Kong	Fatehah Mustapa; Malaysia	Li Xuemei; China
Individual pursuit	Kim You-ri; South Korea	Sakura Tsukagoshi; Japan	Li Jiujin; China
Points race	Jamie Wong; Hong Kong	Minami Uwano; Japan	Jupha Somnet; Malaysia
Scratch	Kim Eun-hee; South Korea	Tseng Hsiao-chia; Chinese Taipei	Gong Xingyu; China
Omnium	Hsiao Mei-yu; Chinese Taipei	Lee Min-hye; South Korea	Minami Uwano; Japan
Team sprint	China; Li Xuemei; Shi Jingjing	Japan; Kanako Kase; Ryoko Nakagawa	South Korea; Hong Hyeon-ji; Lee Hye-jin
Team pursuit	South Korea; Kim Eun-hee; Kim You-ri; Lee Min-hye; Son Hee-jung	Japan; Kanako Kase; Yoko Kojima; Sakura Tsukagoshi; Minami Uwano	China; Gong Xingyu; Li Jiujin; Sha Hui; Zhang Li

== Medal table ==
Rank	Nation	Gold	Silver	Bronze	Total
1	South Korea	8	2	3	13
2	Hong Kong	4	1	2	7
3	Malaysia	3	2	2	7
4	China	2	4	6	12
5	Chinese Taipei	2	1	2	5
6	Uzbekistan	2	0	0	2
7	Kazakhstan	1	2	1	4
8	Mongolia	1	0	0	1
9	Japan	0	7	3	10
10	Iran	0	4	3	7
11	Kyrgyzstan	0	0	1	1
Totals (11 entries)		23	23	23	69
