= 2017 Asian Road Cycling Championships =

- Venue: Manama, Bahrain
- Date(s): 25 February – 2 March 2017

The 2017 Asian Road Cycling Championships were held in Manama, Bahrain from 25 February to 2 March 2017.

== Medal summary ==
=== Men ===
Event	Gold	Silver	Bronze
Individual road race	Park Sang-hong; South Korea	Yousif Mirza; United Arab Emirates	Zhandos Bizhigitov; Kazakhstan
Individual time trial	Dmitriy Gruzdev; Kazakhstan	Choe Hyeong-min; South Korea	Cheung King Lok; Hong Kong
Team time trial	Kazakhstan; Alexey Lutsenko; Dmitriy Gruzdev; Andrey Zeits; Daniil Fominykh; Zhandos Bizhigitov; Bakhtiyar Kozhatayev	Japan; Takeaki Amezawa; Yukiya Arashiro; Nariyuki Masuda; Rei Onodera; Ryota Nishizono; Hayato Okamoto	Hong Kong; Leung Chun Wing; Ko Siu Wai; Cheung King Lok; Ho Burr; Leung Ka Yu; Mow Ching Yin

=== Women ===
Event	Gold	Silver	Bronze
Individual road race	Yang Qianyu; Hong Kong	Na Ah-reum; South Korea	Miho Yoshikawa; Japan
Individual time trial	Liang Hongyu; China	Lee Ju-mi; South Korea	Yumi Kajihara; Japan

== Medal table ==
Rank	Nation	Gold	Silver	Bronze	Total
1	Kazakhstan	2	0	1	3
2	South Korea	1	3	0	4
3	Hong Kong	1	0	2	3
4	China	1	0	0	1
5	Japan	0	1	2	3
6	United Arab Emirates	0	1	0	1
Totals (6 entries)		5	5	5	15
