= 2018 Asian Road Cycling Championships =

- Venue: Naypyidaw, Myanmar
- Date(s): 8–12 February 2018

The 2018 Asian Road Cycling Championships were held in Naypyidaw, Myanmar from 8 February to 12 February 2018.

== Medal summary ==
=== Men ===
Event	Gold	Silver	Bronze
Individual road race	Yousif Mirza; United Arab Emirates	Fumiyuki Beppu; Japan	Mehdi Sohrabi; Iran
Individual time trial	Cheung King Lok; Hong Kong	Choe Hyeong-min; South Korea	Arvin Moazzami; Iran
Team time trial	Japan; Yukiya Arashiro; Fumiyuki Beppu; Rei Onodera; Masaki Yamamoto; Shoi Matsuda; Yusuke Hatanaka	Iran; Arvin Moazzami; Samad Pourseyedi; Behnam Arian; Mehdi Sohrabi; Mohammad Rajabloo; Mohammad Esmaeil Chaichi	Hong Kong; Cheung King Lok; Fung Ka Hoo; Ko Siu Wai; Ho Burr; Mow Ching Yin; Leung Chun Wing

=== Women ===
Event	Gold	Silver	Bronze
Individual road race	Nguyễn Thị Thật; Vietnam	Huang Ting-ying; Chinese Taipei	Chang Yao; Chinese Taipei
Individual time trial	Lee Ju-mi; South Korea	Huang Ting-ying; Chinese Taipei	Miyoko Karami; Japan

== Medal table ==
Rank	Nation	Gold	Silver	Bronze	Total
1	Japan	1	1	1	3
2	South Korea	1	1	0	2
3	Hong Kong	1	0	1	2
4	United Arab Emirates	1	0	0	1
4	Vietnam	1	0	0	1
6	Chinese Taipei	0	2	1	3
7	Iran	0	1	2	3
Totals (7 entries)		5	5	5	15
