= Cycling at the Asian Games =

- Governing bodies: UCI (World) / ACC (Asia)
- Events: 22 (men: 11; women: 11)

Games
- 1951; 1954; 1958; 1962; 1966; 1970; 1974; 1978; 1982; 1986; 1990; 1994; 1998; 2002; 2006; 2010; 2014; 2018; 2022; 2026
- Medalists; Records

Cycling events have been contested at every Asian Games since the 1951 Asian Games in New Delhi, with the exception of the 1954 Games.

== Editions ==
Games	Year	Host city	Best nation
I	1951	New Delhi, India	Japan
III	1958	Tokyo, Japan	Japan
IV	1962	Jakarta, Indonesia	Indonesia
V	1966	Bangkok, Thailand	Thailand
VI	1970	Bangkok, Thailand	Japan
VII	1974	Tehran, Iran	Japan
VIII	1978	Bangkok, Thailand	Japan
IX	1982	New Delhi, India	Japan
X	1986	Seoul, South Korea	Japan
XI	1990	Beijing, China	China
XII	1994	Hiroshima, Japan	China
XIII	1998	Bangkok, Thailand	China
XIV	2002	Busan, South Korea	China
XV	2006	Doha, Qatar	China
XVI	2010	Guangzhou, China	China
XVII	2014	Incheon, South Korea	China
XVIII	2018	Jakarta–Palembang, Indonesia	China
XIX	2022	Hangzhou, China	Japan
XX	2026	Izu, Japan	China

== Events ==
Event	51	58	62	66	70	74	78	82	86	90	94	98	02	06	10	14	18	22	26	Years
BMX freestyle
Men's park																			X	1
Women's park																			X	1
BMX racing
Men															X	X	X	X	X	5
Women															X	X	X	X	X	5
Mountain bike
Men's cross-country												X	X		X	X	X	X	X	7
Men's downhill												X	X				X			3
Women's cross-country												X	X		X	X	X	X	X	7
Women's downhill												X	X				X			3
Road
Men's road race	X	X	X	X	X	X	X	X	X	X	X	X	X	X	X	X	X	X	X	19
Men's open road race			X																	1
Men's individual time trial												X	X	X	X	X	X	X	X	8
Men's team road race		X	X	X	X															4
Men's team time trial			X	X	X	X	X	X	X	X	X			X						10
Women's road race									X	X	X	X	X	X	X	X	X	X	X	11
Women's individual time trial												X	X	X	X	X	X	X	X	8
Track
Men's sprint	X	X				X	X	X	X	X	X	X	X	X	X	X	X	X	X	16
Men's time trial	X	X		X	X	X	X	X	X	X	X	X	X	X						13
Men's keirin													X	X	X	X	X	X	X	7
Men's individual pursuit				X	X	X	X	X	X	X	X	X	X	X	X		X			13
Men's points race								X	X	X	X	X	X	X	X					8
Men's 800 m mass start				X	X															2
Men's 1600 m mass start				X	X															2
Men's 4800 m mass start				X	X															2
Men's 10 km mass start				X	X															2
Men's omnium																X	X	X	X	4
Men's tandem		X																		1
Men's madison													X	X			X	X	X	5
Men's team sprint													X	X	X	X	X	X	X	7
Men's team pursuit	X	X		X	X	X	X	X	X	X	X	X	X	X	X	X	X	X	X	18
Men's 1600 m team time trial				X	X															2
Women's sprint									X	X	X	X	X	X	X	X	X	X	X	11
Women's time trial										X			X	X	X					4
Women's keirin																X	X	X	X	4
Women's individual pursuit										X	X	X	X	X	X		X			7
Women's points race													X	X	X					3
Women's omnium																X	X	X	X	4
Women's madison																	X	X	X	3
Women's team sprint																X	X	X	X	4
Women's team pursuit																X	X	X	X	4
Total	4	6	4	11	11	6	6	7	9	11	10	15	20	17	18	18	24	20	22	239

== Medal table ==
Rank	Nation	Gold	Silver	Bronze	Total
1	Japan (JPN)	66	58	33	157
2	China (CHN)	49	46	38	133
3	South Korea (KOR)	39	37	45	121
4	Thailand (THA)	15	13	11	39
5	Hong Kong (HKG)	13	12	10	35
6	Kazakhstan (KAZ)	13	9	9	31
7	Indonesia (INA)	6	5	7	18
8	Iran (IRI)	5	10	15	30
9	Malaysia (MAS)	4	6	9	19
10	Chinese Taipei (TPE)	3	5	13	21
11	Uzbekistan (UZB)	3	2	1	6
12	Philippines (PHI)	1	2	10	13
13	Kyrgyzstan (KGZ)	0	5	2	7
14	Mongolia (MGL)	0	2	3	5
15	Pakistan (PAK)	0	2	1	3
16	Vietnam (VIE)	0	1	3	4
17	India (IND)	0	1	2	3
18	Iraq (IRQ)	0	1	0	1
19	Sri Lanka (SRI)	0	0	2	2
20	United Arab Emirates (UAE)	0	0	1	1
Totals (20 entries)		217	217	215	649
