= Cycling at the 2002 Asian Games =

- Venue: Busan Road Cycle Race Stadium; Geumjeong Velodrome; Gijang Mountain Bike Race Stadium
- Dates: 30 September – 13 October 2002
- Competitors: 181 from 20 nations

Cycling was contested at the 2002 Asian Games in Busan, South Korea. Road bicycle racing was held at the Road Cycle Race Stadium from September 30 to October 2, while track cycling was contested at Geumjeong Velodrome from October 4 to October 8 and mountain biking was contested at Gijang Mountain Bike Race Stadium from October 10 to October 13.

== Schedule ==
Q	Qualification	E	Elimination rounds	F	Finals

Event↓/Date →	30th Mon	1st Tue	2nd Wed	3rd Thu	4th Fri		5th Sat	6th Sun	7th Mon		8th Tue	9th Wed	10th Thu		11th Fri	12th Sat	13th Sun
Mountain bike
Men's cross-country																	F
Men's downhill													Q	F			
Women's cross-country																F	
Women's downhill													Q	F			
Road
Men's road race				F													
Men's individual time trial	F																
Women's road race			F														
Women's individual time trial	F																
Track
Men's sprint					Q		E		E		F						
Men's 1 km time trial					F												
Men's keirin									E		F						
Men's individual pursuit					Q	E	F										
Men's points race									F								
Men's madison											F						
Men's team sprint					Q		F										
Men's team pursuit							Q		E	F							
Women's sprint					Q		E		E		F						
Women's 500 m time trial					F												
Women's individual pursuit					Q	E	F										
Women's points race									F								

== Medalists ==
=== Mountain bike ===
==== Men ====
Event	Gold	Silver	Bronze
Cross-country	Kenji Takeya; Japan	Zhu Yongbiao; China	Li Fuyu; China
Downhill	Jung Hyung-rae; South Korea	Takashi Tsukamoto; Japan	Ryo Uchijima; Japan

==== Women ====
Event	Gold	Silver	Bronze
Cross-country	Ma Yanping; China	Yukari Nakagome; Japan	Zhang Na; China
Downhill	Mio Suemasa; Japan	Mami Masuda; Japan	Risa Suseanty; Indonesia

=== Road ===
==== Men ====
Event	Gold	Silver	Bronze
Road race	Sergey Krushevskiy; Uzbekistan	Alexander Vinokourov; Kazakhstan	Wong Kam Po; Hong Kong
Individual time trial	Andrey Teteryuk; Kazakhstan	Eugen Wacker; Kyrgyzstan	Sergey Krushevskiy; Uzbekistan

==== Women ====
Event	Gold	Silver	Bronze
Road race	Kim Yong-mi; South Korea	Uyun Muzizah; Indonesia	Jiang Yanxia; China
Individual time trial	Li Meifang; China	Ayumu Otsuka; Japan	Lee Eun-joo; South Korea

=== Track ===
==== Men ====
Event	Gold	Silver	Bronze
Sprint	Takashi Kaneko; Japan	Josiah Ng; Malaysia	Akihiro Isezaki; Japan
1 km time trial	Lin Chih-hsan; Chinese Taipei	Keiichi Omori; Japan	Kim Chi-bum; South Korea
Keirin	Shinichi Ota; Japan	Yuji Yamada; Japan	Hyun Byung-chul; South Korea
Individual pursuit	Vadim Kravchenko; Kazakhstan	Suh Seok-kyu; South Korea	Noriyuki Iijima; Japan
Points race	Cho Ho-sung; South Korea	Ma Yajun; China	Noriyuki Iijima; Japan
Madison	South Korea; Suh Seok-kyu; Cho Ho-sung	Japan; Makoto Iijima; Shinichi Fukushima	Hong Kong; Wong Kam Po; Ho Siu Lun
Team sprint	Japan; Yuichiro Kamiyama; Harutomo Watanabe; Takashi Kaneko	South Korea; Yang Hee-jin; Cho Hyun-ok; Kim Chi-bum	Chinese Taipei; Lin Kun-hung; Chen Keng-hsien; Lin Chih-hsan
Team pursuit	China; Guo Jianbin; Ma Yajun; Shi Guijun; Wang Fei	Iran; Hossein Askari; Alireza Haghi; Abbas Saeidi Tanha; Amir Zargari	Kazakhstan; Vladimir Bushanskiy; Andrey Kashechkin; Vadim Kravchenko; Dmitriy Muravyev

==== Women ====
Event	Gold	Silver	Bronze
Sprint	Li Na; China	Maya Tachikawa; Japan	Ku Hyun-jin; South Korea
500 m time trial	Jiang Yonghua; China	Sayuri Osuga; Japan	Lee Jong-ae; South Korea
Individual pursuit	Zhao Haijuan; China	Uyun Muzizah; Indonesia	Lim Hyung-joon; South Korea
Points race	Kim Yong-mi; South Korea	Ayumu Otsuka; Japan	Santia Tri Kusuma; Indonesia

== Medal table ==
Rank	Nation	Gold	Silver	Bronze	Total
1	China (CHN)	6	2	3	11
2	Japan (JPN)	5	10	4	19
3	South Korea (KOR)	5	2	6	13
4	Kazakhstan (KAZ)	2	1	1	4
5	Chinese Taipei (TPE)	1	0	1	2
5	Uzbekistan (UZB)	1	0	1	2
7	Indonesia (INA)	0	2	2	4
8	Iran (IRI)	0	1	0	1
8	Kyrgyzstan (KGZ)	0	1	0	1
8	Malaysia (MAS)	0	1	0	1
11	Hong Kong (HKG)	0	0	2	2
Totals (11 entries)		20	20	20	60

== Participating nations ==
A total of 181 athletes from 20 nations competed in cycling at the 2002 Asian Games:

- Afghanistan (1)
- China (22)
- Chinese Taipei (17)
- Hong Kong (13)
- India (5)
- Indonesia (13)
- Iran (9)
- Japan (27)
- Kazakhstan (11)
- Kyrgyzstan (1)
- Malaysia (3)
- Mongolia (4)
- Pakistan (1)
- Philippines (7)
- Saudi Arabia (3)
- South Korea (26)
- Thailand (6)
- Timor-Leste (1)
- Uzbekistan (5)
- Vietnam (6)
