= Cycling at the 1998 Asian Games =

- Venue: Khao Yai Rimthan Resort; Phahonyothin Road; Huamark Velodrome
- Dates: 7–19 December 1998

Cycling was contested at the 1998 Asian Games in Thailand from December 7 to December 19. Road bicycle racing was held at the Highway No 1 and No 2 from Saraburi Province to Nakhon Ratchasima Province, while track cycling was contested at Huamark Velodrome in Bangkok and mountain biking was contested in Khao Yai National Park, Nakhon Ratchasima Province.

== Schedule ==
Q	Qualification	E	Elimination rounds	F	Finals

Event↓/Date →	7th Mon	8th Tue	9th Wed	10th Thu	11th Fri	12th Sat	13th Sun	14th Mon		15th Tue	16th Wed	17th Thu	18th Fri	19th Sat
Mountain bike
Men's cross-country		F												
Men's downhill	F													
Women's cross-country		F												
Women's downhill	F													
Road
Men's road race														F
Men's individual time trial				F										
Women's road race														F
Women's individual time trial				F										
Track
Men's sprint								Q		E	F			
Men's 1 km time trial								F						
Men's individual pursuit								Q	E	F				
Men's points race												F		
Men's team pursuit										Q	E	F		
Women's sprint								Q		E	F			
Women's individual pursuit								Q	E	F				

== Medalists ==
=== Mountain bike ===
==== Men ====
Event	Gold	Silver	Bronze
Cross-country	Akihito Udagawa; Japan	Surajit Jirojwong; Thailand	Li Fuyu; China
Downhill	Phannarong Kongsamut; Thailand	Takashi Tsukamoto; Japan	Brian Cook; Hong Kong

==== Women ====
Event	Gold	Silver	Bronze
Cross-country	Ma Yanping; China	Kanako Kobayashi; Japan	Chantana Singupatham; Thailand
Downhill	Sachiko Kamakura; Japan	Mami Masuda; Japan	Chen Ju-miao; Chinese Taipei

=== Road ===
==== Men ====
Event	Gold	Silver	Bronze
Road race	Wong Kam Po; Hong Kong	Makoto Iijima; Japan	Victor Espiritu; Philippines
Individual time trial	Ghader Mizbani; Iran	Dmitriy Fofonov; Kazakhstan	Pavel Nevdakh; Kazakhstan

==== Women ====
Event	Gold	Silver	Bronze
Road race	Banna Kamfoo; Thailand	Kaori Sakashita; Japan	Wang Shuqing; China
Individual time trial	Zhao Haijuan; China	Ma Huizhen; China	Ayumu Otsuka; Japan

=== Track ===
==== Men ====
Event	Gold	Silver	Bronze
Sprint	Yuichiro Kamiyama; Japan	Noriaki Mabuchi; Japan	Hyun Byung-chul; South Korea
1 km time trial	Ji Sung-hwan; South Korea	Takanobu Jumonji; Japan	Chen Keng-hsien; Chinese Taipei
Individual pursuit	Vadim Kravchenko; Kazakhstan	Noriyuki Iijima; Japan	Eugen Wacker; Kyrgyzstan
Points race	Sergey Lavrenenko; Kazakhstan	Cho Ho-sung; South Korea	Amir Zargari; Iran
Team pursuit	South Korea; Hong Suk-hwan; Noh Young-sik; Ji Sung-hwan; Cho Ho-sung	Kazakhstan; Vadim Kravchenko; Dmitriy Muravyev; Vladimir Bushanskiy; Valeriy Titov	China; Wang Zhengquan; Shi Guijun; Pan Guangchun; Ma Yajun

==== Women ====
Event	Gold	Silver	Bronze
Sprint	Wang Yan; China	Jiang Cuihua; China	Fang Fen-fang; Chinese Taipei
Individual pursuit	Wang Qingzhi; China	Zhao Haijuan; China	Kim Yong-mi; South Korea

== Medal table ==
Rank	Nation	Gold	Silver	Bronze	Total
1	China (CHN)	4	3	3	10
2	Japan (JPN)	3	8	1	12
3	Kazakhstan (KAZ)	2	2	1	5
4	South Korea (KOR)	2	1	2	5
5	Thailand (THA)	2	1	1	4
6	Hong Kong (HKG)	1	0	1	2
6	Iran (IRI)	1	0	1	2
8	Chinese Taipei (TPE)	0	0	3	3
9	Kyrgyzstan (KGZ)	0	0	1	1
9	Philippines (PHI)	0	0	1	1
Totals (10 entries)		15	15	15	45
