= 1999 Asian Cycling Championships =

- Venue: Maebashi, Japan
- Date: 6–13 June 1999
- Velodrome: Green Dome Maebashi

The 1999 Asian Cycling Championships took place at Green Dome Maebashi, Maebashi and Tsumagoi, Japan from 6 to 13 June 1999.

== Medal summary ==
=== Road ===
==== Men ====
Event	Gold	Silver	Bronze
Individual road race	Sergey Yakovlev; Kazakhstan	Hidenori Nodera; Japan	
Individual time trial	Andrey Mizurov; Kazakhstan	Sergey Yakovlev; Kazakhstan	Osamu Sumida; Japan

==== Women ====
Event	Gold	Silver	Bronze
Individual road race	Miho Oki; Japan	Yang Limei; China	Akemi Morimoto; Japan
Individual time trial	Zhao Haijuan; China	Shim Jung-hwa; South Korea	Miyoko Karami; Japan

=== Track ===
==== Men ====
Event	Gold	Silver	Bronze
Sprint	Hideki Yamada; Japan	Noriaki Mabuchi; Japan	Hyun Byung-chul; South Korea
1 km time trial	Narihiro Inamura; Japan	Ji Sung-hwan; South Korea	Hong Suk-hwan; South Korea
Keirin	Shinichi Ota; Japan	Yuichiro Kamiyama; Japan	Eom In-yeong; South Korea
Individual pursuit	Vadim Kravchenko; Kazakhstan	Wong Kam Po; Hong Kong	Noriyuki Iijima; Japan
Points race			
Madison	Iran; Alireza Haghi; Moezeddin Seyed-Rezaei	Japan	Hong Kong; Wong Kam Po; Ho Siu Lun
Team sprint	Japan; Narihiro Inamura; Toshiaki Fushimi; Takanobu Jumonji	South Korea; Hyun Byung-chul; Hong Suk-hwan; Ji Sung-hwan	Chinese Taipei; Cheng Keng-hsien; Wu Hsien-tang; Tseng Chi-ming
Team pursuit	Japan; Noriyuki Iijima; Toshibumi Kodama; Isao Matsuzaki; Shinya Sakamoto	South Korea; Cho Hyun-ok; Kwan Ki-bak; Hong Suk-hwan; Noh Young-sik	Iran; Alireza Haghi; Mousa Arbati; Reza Raz; Hassan Maleki; Amir Zargari

==== Women ====
Event	Gold	Silver	Bronze
Sprint	Wang Yan; China	Jiang Cuihua; China	Kazuyo Murashita; Japan
500 m time trial	China		
Individual pursuit	Zhao Haijuan; China	Kim Yong-mi; South Korea	Kaori Iida; Japan
Points race	Kaori Iida; Japan	Fang Fen-fang; Chinese Taipei	Kim Yong-mi; South Korea
