= 2001 Asian Cycling Championships =

- Venue: Kaohsiung and Taichung, Taiwan
- Date(s): 8–15 July 2001

The 2001 Asian Cycling Championships took place at Kaohsiung and Taichung, Taiwan from 8 to 15 July 2001.

== Medal summary ==
=== Road ===
==== Men ====
Event	Gold	Silver	Bronze
Individual road race	Wong Kam Po; Hong Kong	Arnel Quirimit; Philippines	Junichi Shibuya; Japan
Individual time trial	Hossein Askari; Iran	Jamsrangiin Ölzii-Orshikh; Mongolia	Wong Kam Po; Hong Kong

==== Women ====
Event	Gold	Silver	Bronze
Individual road race	Kim Yong-mi; South Korea	Hoàng Thị Thanh Tân; Vietnam	Miho Oki; Japan
Individual time trial	Lim Hang-jun; South Korea	Miho Oki; Japan	Chen Chiung-yi; Chinese Taipei

=== Track ===
==== Men ====
Event	Gold	Silver	Bronze
Sprint	Takashi Kaneko; Japan	Cho Hyun-ok; South Korea	Hiroyuki Nunoi; Japan
1 km time trial	Keiichi Omori; Japan	Song Kyung-bang; South Korea	Huang Chih-ying; Chinese Taipei
Keirin	Toshiaki Fushimi; Japan	Hisanori Uchibayashi; Japan	Kim Chi-bum; South Korea
Individual pursuit	Vadim Kravchenko; Kazakhstan	Noriyuki Iijima; Japan	Wong Kam Po; Hong Kong
Points race	Cho Ho-sung; South Korea	Chun Dae-hong; South Korea	Makoto Iijima; Japan
Elimination	Cho Ho-sung; South Korea	Paulo Manapul; Philippines	Amir Zargari; Iran
Madison	Japan	Iran; Amir Zargari; Alireza Haghi	Hong Kong
Team sprint	Japan; Takashi Kaneko; Hiroyuki Nunoi; Keiichi Omori	South Korea; Cho Hyun-ok; Song Kyung-bang; Kim Chi-bum	Chinese Taipei; Liu Chin-feng; Lin Chih-hsun; Lin Kun-hung
Team pursuit	South Korea; Choi Soon-young; Chun Dae-hong; Cho Ho-sung; Chang Il-nam	Chinese Taipei; Chen Teng-tian; Pai Chi-lin; Ting Cheng-chang; Tsai Shao-yu	Japan; Noriyuki Iijima; Yusuke Kuroki; Megumu Morohashi; Kanotoshi Madoba

==== Women ====
Event	Gold	Silver	Bronze
Sprint	Lu Yi-wen; Chinese Taipei	Lee Jong-ae; South Korea	Ku Hyun-jin; South Korea
500 m time trial	Lu Yi-wen; Chinese Taipei	Maya Tachikawa; Japan	Ku Hyun-jin; South Korea
Individual pursuit	Kim Yong-mi; South Korea	Lim Hang-jun; South Korea	Nurhayati; Indonesia
Points race	Kim Yong-mi; South Korea	Nurhayati; Indonesia	Lim Mi-young; South Korea
Elimination	Kim Yong-mi; South Korea	Fang Fen-fang; Chinese Taipei	Nurhayati; Indonesia
Team sprint	South Korea; Kim Yong-mi; Lee Jong-ae; Ku Hyun-jin	Chinese Taipei; Lu Yi-wen; Wu Fang-ju; Hsu Pei-wen	Indonesia; Nurhayati; Secelia Sucestoria; Santia Tri Kusuma
Team pursuit	Chinese Taipei; Chen Chiung-yi; Fang Fen-fang; Lan Hsiao-yun; Hwang He-xun	Indonesia; Nurhayati; Secelia Sucestoria; Santia Tri Kusuma; Nuraini	South Korea; Kim Yong-mi; Lim Hang-jun; Lim Mi-young; Ku Hyun-jin

== Medal table ==
Rank	Nation	Gold	Silver	Bronze	Total
1	South Korea	9	6	5	20
2	Japan	5	4	5	14
3	Chinese Taipei	3	3	3	9
4	Iran	1	1	1	3
5	Hong Kong	1	0	3	4
6	Kazakhstan	1	0	0	1
7	Indonesia	0	2	3	5
8	Philippines	0	2	0	2
9	Mongolia	0	1	0	1
9	Vietnam	0	1	0	1
Totals (10 entries)		20	20	20	60

== See also ==
- List of sporting events in Taiwan
