= 1995 Asian Cycling Championships =

- Venue: Quezon City, Philippines
- Date(s): 23 April – 3 May 1995
- Velodrome: Amoranto Velodrome

The 1995 Asian Cycling Championships took place at Amoranto Velodrome, Quezon City, Metro Manila, Philippines from April 23 to May 3, 1995.

== Medal summary ==
=== Road ===
==== Men ====
Event	Gold	Silver	Bronze
Individual road race	Kazakhstan		
Individual time trial	Andrey Mizurov; Kazakhstan	Kim Tae-ho; South Korea	Aleksandr Dyadichkin; Kyrgyzstan

==== Women ====
Event	Gold	Silver	Bronze
Individual road race			
Individual time trial	Ma Huizhen; China	Song Chung-mi; South Korea	Chang Hsu-ying; Chinese Taipei

=== Track ===
==== Men ====
Event	Gold	Silver	Bronze
Sprint	Hyun Byung-chul; South Korea	Kazuhiro Kaida; Japan	Toshinobu Saito; Japan
1 km time trial	Narihiro Inamura; Japan	Hong Suk-hwan; South Korea	Masanaga Shiohara; Japan
Keirin	Masanaga Shiohara; Japan	Tsutomu Yokota; Japan	
Individual pursuit	Vadim Kravchenko; Kazakhstan	Eugen Wacker; Kyrgyzstan	
Points race	Masahiro Yasuhara; Japan	Daisaku Takahashi; Japan	Sergey Lavrenenko; Kazakhstan
Elimination	Cho Ho-sung; South Korea	Sergey Konnov; Kazakhstan	Norberto Oconer; Philippines
Team pursuit	South Korea	Japan	

==== Women ====
Event	Gold	Silver	Bronze
Sprint	Chang Yubin; China	Seiko Hashimoto; Japan	Shim Eun-jung; South Korea
500 m time trial	Chang Yubin; China		
Individual pursuit	Ma Huizhen; China	Wang Qingzhi; China	
Points race	Chang Yubin; China	Nurhayati; Indonesia	Chang Hsu-ying; Chinese Taipei
