= Cycling at the 1998 Asian Games – Men's team pursuit =

Men's team pursuit at the 1998 Asian Games
- Venue: Huamark Velodrome
- Date: 15–17 December 1998
- Nations: 9

Medalists
| gold medal | South Korea; Hong Suk-hwan, Noh Young-sik, Ji Sung-hwan, Cho Ho-sung |
| silver medal | Kazakhstan; Vadim Kravchenko, Dmitriy Muravyev, Vladimir Bushanskiy, Valeriy Titov |
| bronze medal | China; Wang Zhengquan, Shi Guijun, Pan Guangchun, Ma Yajun |

The men's 4 kilometres team pursuit competition at the 1998 Asian Games was held from 15 to 17 December at Huamark Velodrome.

== Schedule ==
All times are Indochina Time (UTC+07:00)

| Date | Time | Event |
|---|---|---|
| Tuesday, 15 December 1998 | 08:00 | Qualification |
| Wednesday, 16 December 1998 | 08:00 | Quarterfinals |
| Wednesday, 16 December 1998 | 08:00 | Semifinals |
| Thursday, 17 December 1998 | 08:00 | Finals |

== Results ==
Legend

- DNF — Did not finish

=== Qualification ===
| Rank | Team | Time | Notes |
|---|---|---|---|
| 1 | China (CHN); Wang Zhengquan; Ma Yajun; Pan Guangchun; Shi Guijun | 4:32.895 | |
| 2 | Kazakhstan (KAZ); Sergey Tretyakov; Valeriy Titov; Dmitriy Muravyev; Andrey Kashechkin | 4.34.610 | |
| 3 | Japan (JPN); Susumu Oikawa; Noriyuki Iijima; Toshifumi Kodama; Shinya Sakamoto | 4.35.668 | |
| 4 | South Korea (KOR); Hong Suk-hwan; Cho Ho-sung; Ji Sung-hwan; Jun Dae-hong | 4:35.931 | |
| 5 | Iran (IRI); Hossein Askari; Ghader Mizbani; Mousa Arbati; Amir Zargari | 4:35.962 | |
| 6 | Chinese Taipei (TPE); Chen Keng-hsien; Mu Chih-hsin; Sun Yu-liang; Chen Teng-tien | 4:37.693 | |
| 7 | Thailand (THA); Panupong Maneepong; Montree Chaiprasit; Junya Juisakul; Thongchai Wangardjaingam | 4:44.679 | |
| 8 | Hong Kong (HKG); Wong Kam Po; Tsang Kai Ming; Li Sai Hong; Ho Siu Lun | 4:44.679 | |
| — | Kyrgyzstan (KGZ); Sergey Derevyanov; Sergey Yazov; Konstantin Gamman; Eugen Wacker | DNF | |

=== Quarterfinals ===
==== Heat 1 ====
| Rank | Team | Time | Notes |
|---|---|---|---|
| 1 | South Korea (KOR) | 4.32.394 | |
| 2 | Iran (IRI) | 4.34.805 | |

==== Heat 2 ====
| Rank | Team | Time | Notes |
|---|---|---|---|
| 1 | Chinese Taipei (TPE) | 4:39.292 | |
| 2 | Japan (JPN) | 4:41.409 | |

==== Heat 3 ====
| Rank | Team | Time | Notes |
|---|---|---|---|
| 1 | Kazakhstan (KAZ) | 4:30.207 | |
| 2 | Thailand (THA) | Overlapped | |

==== Heat 4 ====
| Rank | Team | Time | Notes |
|---|---|---|---|
| 1 | China (CHN) | 4:30.834 | |
| 2 | Hong Kong (HKG) | Overlapped | |

=== Semifinals ===
==== Heat 1 ====
| Rank | Team | Time | Notes |
|---|---|---|---|
| 1 | South Korea (KOR) | 4:28.191 | |
| 2 | China (CHN) | 4:31.165 | |

==== Heat 2 ====
| Rank | Team | Time | Notes |
|---|---|---|---|
| 1 | Kazakhstan (KAZ) | 4:31.026 | |
| 2 | Chinese Taipei (TPE) | Overlapped | |

=== Finals ===
==== Bronze ====
| Rank | Team | Time | Notes |
|---|---|---|---|
| 3rd place, bronze medalist(s) | China (CHN); Wang Zhengquan; Shi Guijun; Pan Guangchun; Ma Yajun | 4:32.831 | |
| 4 | Chinese Taipei (TPE); Chen Keng-hsien; Chen Teng-tien; Sun Yu-liang; Mu Chih-hsin | 4:38.164 | |

==== Gold ====
| Rank | Team | Time | Notes |
|---|---|---|---|
| 1st place, gold medalist(s) | South Korea (KOR); Hong Suk-hwan; Noh Young-sik; Ji Sung-hwan; Cho Ho-sung | 4:36.609 | |
| 2nd place, silver medalist(s) | Kazakhstan (KAZ); Vadim Kravchenko; Dmitriy Muravyev; Vladimir Bushanskiy; Valeriy Titov | 4:43.786 | |
