= Cycling at the 2002 Asian Games – Women's cross-country =

Women's cross-country at the 2002 Asian Games
- Venue: Gijang Mountain Bike Race Stadium
- Date: 12 October 2002
- Competitors: 10 from 7 nations

Medalists
gold medal	Ma Yanping	China
silver medal	Yukari Nakagome	Japan
bronze medal	Zhang Na	China

The women's cross-country competition at the 2002 Asian Games in Gijang County was held on 12 October at the Gijang Mountain Bike Race Stadium.

== Schedule ==
All times are Korea Standard Time (UTC+09:00)

Date	Time	Event
Saturday, 12 October 2002	10:00	Final

== Results ==
Legend

- DNF — Did not finish
- DNS — Did not start

Rank	Athlete	Time
1st place, gold medalist(s)	Ma Yanping (CHN)	1:42:48
2nd place, silver medalist(s)	Yukari Nakagome (JPN)	1:43:51
3rd place, bronze medalist(s)	Zhang Na (CHN)	1:46:27
4	Hiroko Nambu (JPN)	1:49:12
5	Marites Bitbit (PHI)	1:55:26
6	Gwak Mi-hee (KOR)	1:58:51
7	Chantana Jirojwong (THA)	2:09:33
—	Alexandra Yeung (HKG)	DNF
—	Nguyễn Thị Thanh Huyền (VIE)	DNF
—	Phan Thị Thùy Trang (VIE)	DNS
