= Cycling at the 1998 Asian Games – Women's road race =

Women's road race at the 1998 Asian Games
- Venue: Phahonyothin Road
- Date: 19 December 1998
- Competitors: 16 from 8 nations

Medalists
gold medal	Banna Kamfoo	Thailand
silver medal	Kaori Sakashita	Japan
bronze medal	Wang Shuqing	China

The women's road race competition at the 1998 Asian Games was held on 19 December.

== Schedule ==
All times are Indochina Time (UTC+07:00)

Date	Time	Event
Saturday, 19 December 1998	08:00	Final

== Results ==
Legend

- DNF — Did not finish

Rank	Athlete	Time
1st place, gold medalist(s)	Banna Kamfoo (THA)	3:01:25
2nd place, silver medalist(s)	Kaori Sakashita (JPN)	3:01:25
3rd place, bronze medalist(s)	Wang Shuqing (CHN)	3:01:25
4	Choi Hyun-soon (KOR)	3:01:25
5	Fang Fen-fang (TPE)	3:01:34
6	Tang Quan (CHN)	3:04:48
7	Miho Oki (JPN)	3:04:48
8	Fatma Galiulina (UZB)	3:04:49
9	Ayumu Otsuka (JPN)	3:04:49
10	Kim Yong-mi (KOR)	3:04:49
11	Ma Huizhen (CHN)	3:04:51
12	Shim Jung-hwa (KOR)	3:04:51
13	Alexandra Yeung (HKG)	3:11:02
14	Skuntala Chantasit (THA)	3:11:12
—	Ranida Aisomjit (THA)	DNF
—	Lynn Dabbous (LIB)	DNF
