= Cycling at the 2002 Asian Games – Women's road race =

Women's road race at the 2002 Asian Games
- Venue: Busan Road Cycle Race Stadium
- Date: 2 October 2002
- Competitors: 15 from 9 nations

Medalists
gold medal	Kim Yong-mi	South Korea
silver medal	Uyun Muzizah	Indonesia
bronze medal	Jiang Yanxia	China

The women's road race competition at the 2002 Asian Games was held on 2 October at the Road Cycle Race Stadium. The race was 96.8 km long and began with a mass start.

== Schedule ==
All times are Korea Standard Time (UTC+09:00)

Date	Time	Event
Wednesday, 2 October 2002	10:00	Final

== Results ==
Rank	Athlete	Time
1st place, gold medalist(s)	Kim Yong-mi (KOR)	2:47:19
2nd place, silver medalist(s)	Uyun Muzizah (INA)	2:47:19
3rd place, bronze medalist(s)	Jiang Yanxia (CHN)	2:47:19
4	Guo Xinghong (CHN)	2:47:19
5	Miho Oki (JPN)	2:47:19
6	Vũ Hồng Thủy (VIE)	2:47:19
7	Santia Tri Kusuma (INA)	2:47:19
8	Alexandra Yeung (HKG)	2:47:19
9	Marites Bitbit (PHI)	2:47:19
10	Monrudee Chapookam (THA)	2:47:19
11	Han Song-hee (KOR)	2:47:23
12	Fatma Galiulina (UZB)	2:47:31
13	Huang Ho-hsun (TPE)	2:47:45
14	Hoàng Thị Thanh Tân (VIE)	2:48:30
15	Ayumu Otsuka (JPN)	2:50:41
