= Cycling at the 1998 Asian Games – Women's individual pursuit =

Women's individual pursuit at the 1998 Asian Games
- Venue: Huamark Velodrome
- Date: 14–15 December 1998
- Competitors: 8 from 5 nations

Medalists
gold medal	Wang Qingzhi	China
silver medal	Zhao Haijuan	China
bronze medal	Kim Yong-mi	South Korea

The women's 3 km individual pursuit competition at the 1998 Asian Games was held on 14 and 15 December at Huamark Velodrome.

== Schedule ==
All times are Indochina Time (UTC+07:00)

Date	Time	Event
Monday, 14 December 1998	08:00	Qualification
Monday, 14 December 1998	08:00	Semifinals
Tuesday, 15 December 1998	08:00	Finals

== Results ==
=== Qualification ===
Rank	Athlete	Time	Notes
1	Zhao Haijuan (CHN)	3:53.359	
2	Wang Qingzhi (CHN)	3:56.179	
3	Kim Yong-mi (KOR)	4:05.972	
4	Ayumu Otsuka (JPN)	4:08.163	
5	Banna Kamfoo (THA)	4:08.894	
6	Kaori Sakashita (JPN)	4:12.127	
7	Sripae Charoenpet (THA)	4:28.864	
8	Alexandra Yeung (HKG)	4:33.451	

=== Semifinals ===
==== Heat 1 ====
Rank	Athlete	Time	Notes
1	Wang Qingzhi (CHN)	3.59.550	
2	Kim Yong-mi (KOR)	4.10.747	

==== Heat 2 ====
Rank	Athlete	Time	Notes
1	Zhao Haijuan (CHN)	3.55.187	
2	Ayumu Otsuka (JPN)	Overlapped	

=== Finals ===
==== Bronze ====
Rank	Athlete	Time	Notes
3rd place, bronze medalist(s)	Kim Yong-mi (KOR)	4.11.881	
4	Ayumu Otsuka (JPN)	4.15.683	

==== Gold ====
Rank	Athlete	Time	Notes
1st place, gold medalist(s)	Wang Qingzhi (CHN)	3.55.728	
2nd place, silver medalist(s)	Zhao Haijuan (CHN)	Overlapped	
