= Cycling at the 2002 Asian Games – Women's individual pursuit =

Women's individual pursuit at the 2002 Asian Games
- Venue: Geumjeong Velodrome
- Date: 4–5 October 2002
- Competitors: 7 from 7 nations

Medalists
gold medal	Zhao Haijuan	China
silver medal	Uyun Muzizah	Indonesia
bronze medal	Lim Hyung-joon	South Korea

The women's 3 kilometres individual pursuit competition at the 2002 Asian Games was held on 4 and 5 October at the Geumjeong Velodrome.

== Schedule ==
All times are Korea Standard Time (UTC+09:00)

Date	Time	Event
Friday, 4 October 2002	11:30	Qualification
Friday, 4 October 2002	16:00	1/4 finals
Saturday, 5 October 2002	16:40	Finals

== Records ==
Prior to this competition, the existing world, Asian and Games records were as follows.

World Record	Leontien Zijlaard (NED)	3:30.816	Sydney, Australia	17 September 2000
Asian Record	Wang Qingzhi (CHN)	3:46.752	Hiroshima, Japan	13 October 1994
Games Record	Wang Qingzhi (CHN)	3:46.752	Hiroshima, Japan	13 October 1994

== Results ==
Legend

- DNS — Did not start

=== Qualification ===
Rank	Athlete	Time	Notes
1	Uyun Muzizah (INA)	3:52.185	
2	Zhao Haijuan (CHN)	3:52.688	
3	Lim Hyung-joon (KOR)	4:01.235	
4	Lan Hsiao-yun (TPE)	4:04.690	
5	Chanpeng Nontasin (THA)	4:05.468	
6	Alexandra Yeung (HKG)	4:07.248	
—	Rameshwori Devi (IND)	DNS	

=== 1/4 finals ===
==== Heat 1 ====
Rank	Athlete	Time	Notes
1	Lan Hsiao-yun (TPE)	4.06.408	
—	Chanpeng Nontasin (THA)	DNS	

==== Heat 2 ====
Rank	Athlete	Time	Notes
1	Lim Hyung-joon (KOR)	3.59.745	
2	Alexandra Yeung (HKG)	4.14.254	

==== Heat 3 ====
Rank	Athlete	Time	Notes
1	Zhao Haijuan (CHN)	3.54.054	

==== Heat 4 ====
Rank	Athlete	Time	Notes
1	Uyun Muzizah (INA)	3.57.780	

==== Summary ====
Rank	Athlete	Time
1	Zhao Haijuan (CHN)	3.54.054
2	Uyun Muzizah (INA)	3.57.780
3	Lim Hyung-joon (KOR)	3.59.745
4	Lan Hsiao-yun (TPE)	4.06.408

=== Finals ===
==== Final (3~4) ====
Rank	Athlete	Time	Notes
3rd place, bronze medalist(s)	Lim Hyung-joon (KOR)	3:56.240	
4	Lan Hsiao-yun (TPE)	3:59.502	

==== Final (1~2) ====
Rank	Athlete	Time	Notes
1st place, gold medalist(s)	Zhao Haijuan (CHN)	3:46.523	AR
2nd place, silver medalist(s)	Uyun Muzizah (INA)	3:47.489	
