= Cycling at the 1998 Asian Games – Men's points race =

Men's points race at the 1998 Asian Games
- Venue: Huamark Velodrome
- Date: 17 December 1998
- Competitors: 20 from 10 nations

Medalists
| gold medal | Sergey Lavrenenko | Kazakhstan |
| silver medal | Cho Ho-sung | South Korea |
| bronze medal | Amir Zargari | Iran |

The men's 40 km points race competition at the 1998 Asian Games was held on 17 December at Huamark Velodrome.

== Schedule ==
All times are Indochina Time (UTC+07:00)

| Date | Time | Event |
|---|---|---|
| Thursday, 17 December 1998 | 08:00 | Final |

== Results ==
Legend

- DNF — Did not finish

| Rank | Athlete | Laps down | Score |
|---|---|---|---|
| 1st place, gold medalist(s) | Sergey Lavrenenko (KAZ) | | 41 |
| 2nd place, silver medalist(s) | Cho Ho-sung (KOR) | | 34 |
| 3rd place, bronze medalist(s) | Amir Zargari (IRI) | | 21 |
| 4 | Damir Iratov (UZB) | | 17 |
| 5 | Tomoya Kano (JPN) | | 13 |
| 6 | Kozo Fujita (JPN) | | 11 |
| 7 | Wong Kam Po (HKG) | | 6 |
| 8 | Eugen Wacker (KGZ) | | 6 |
| 9 | Konstantin Gamman (KGZ) | | 4 |
| 10 | Shi Guijun (CHN) | −1 | 18 |
| 11 | Jun Dae-hong (KOR) | −1 | 15 |
| 12 | Li Sai Hong (HKG) | −1 | 10 |
| 13 | Alireza Haghi (IRI) | −1 | 5 |
| 14 | Mu Chih-hsin (TPE) | −2 | 4 |
| 15 | Rafael Nuritdinov (UZB) | −2 | 2 |
| 16 | Thongchai Wangardjaingam (THA) | −3 | 0 |
| 17 | Vladimir Bushanskiy (KAZ) | −3 | 0 |
| — | Panupong Maneepong (THA) | | DNF |
| — | Wang Zhengquan (CHN) | | DNF |
| — | Chen Teng-tien (TPE) | | DNF |
