= Cycling at the 1998 Asian Games – Women's sprint =

Women's sprint at the 1998 Asian Games
- Venue: Huamark Velodrome
- Date: 14–16 December 1998
- Competitors: 9 from 5 nations

Medalists
gold medal	Wang Yan	China
silver medal	Jiang Cuihua	China
bronze medal	Fang Fen-fang	Chinese Taipei

The women's sprint competition at the 1998 Asian Games was held from 14 to 16 December at Huamark Velodrome.

== Results ==
Legend

- DNS — Did not start

=== Qualifying ===
Rank	Athlete	Time	Notes
1	Wang Yan (CHN)	11.873	GR
2	Jiang Cuihua (CHN)	11.998	
3	Fang Fen-fang (TPE)	12.471	
4	Lu Yi-wen (TPE)	12.607	
5	Kazuyo Murashita (JPN)	12.749	
6	Thipawan Juntorn (THA)	13.074	
7	Miho Oki (JPN)	13.225	
8	Sirinya Nontaprom (THA)	13.860	
—	Alexandra Yeung (HKG)	DNS	

=== Quarterfinals ===
==== Heat 1 ====
Rank	Athlete	Race 1	Race 2	Decider
1	Wang Yan (CHN)	12.719	13.442	
2	Sirinya Nontaprom (THA)			

==== Heat 2 ====
Rank	Athlete	Race 1	Race 2	Decider
1	Fang Fen-fang (TPE)	13.738	14.005	
2	Thipawan Juntorn (THA)			

==== Heat 3 ====
Rank	Athlete	Race 1	Race 2	Decider
1	Jiang Cuihua (CHN)		13.487	13.349
2	Miho Oki (JPN)	14.130		

==== Heat 4 ====
Rank	Athlete	Race 1	Race 2	Decider
1	Lu Yi-wen (TPE)	13.746	13.582	
2	Kazuyo Murashita (JPN)			

=== Semifinals ===
==== Heat 1 ====
Rank	Athlete	Race 1	Race 2	Decider
1	Wang Yan (CHN)	13.654	12.847	
2	Lu Yi-wen (TPE)			

==== Heat 2 ====
Rank	Athlete	Race 1	Race 2	Decider
1	Jiang Cuihua (CHN)	13.748	13.157	
2	Fang Fen-fang (TPE)			

=== Finals ===
==== Bronze ====
Rank	Athlete	Race 1	Race 2	Decider
3rd place, bronze medalist(s)	Fang Fen-fang (TPE)	14.586		14.387
4	Lu Yi-wen (TPE)		13.056	

==== Gold ====
Rank	Athlete	Race 1	Race 2	Decider
1st place, gold medalist(s)	Wang Yan (CHN)	14.463	13.450	
2nd place, silver medalist(s)	Jiang Cuihua (CHN)			
