= Jung Seung-hwan =

- Hangul: 정승환
- RR: Jeong Seunghwan
- MR: Chŏng Sŭnghwan

Jung Seung-hwan (Korean: 정승환) is a Korean name consisting of the family name Jung and the given name Seung-hwan, and may also refer to:

- Jung Seung-hwan (singer) (born 1996), South Korean singer
- Jung Seung-hwan (sledge hockey) (born 1988), South Korean sledge hockey player
