= Cycling at the 2000 Summer Olympics – Women's cross-country =

Cycling at the Olympics

Women's cross country at the Games of the XXVII Olympiad
- Date: 23 September
- Competitors: 30 from 15 nations
- Winning time: 1:49:24

Medalists
1st place, gold medalist(s)		Paola Pezzo; Italy
2nd place, silver medalist(s)		Barbara Blatter; Switzerland
3rd place, bronze medalist(s)		Margarita Fullana; Spain

These are the official results of the Women's Cross-Country Mountain Biking at the 2000 Summer Olympics in Sydney, Australia. The event was 35.5 kilometres in length and was held on 23 September 2000 at the Fairfield City Farm. There were 30 participants, one of whom did not finish the event.

== Medalists ==
Gold:	Silver:	Bronze:
Paola Pezzo, Italy	Barbara Blatter, Switzerland	Margarita Fullana, Spain

== Final classification ==
RANK	CYCLIST	NOC	TIME
1	Paola Pezzo	Italy	01:49:24
2	Barbara Blatter	Switzerland	+ 0.27
3	Margarita Fullana	Spain	+ 0.35
4	Alla Epifanova	Russia	+ 1.21
5	Alison Sydor	Canada	+ 2.55
6	Mary Grigson	Australia	+ 3.58
7	Alison Dunlap	United States	+ 4.28
8	Chrissy Redden	Canada	+ 4.42
9	Sabine Spitz	Germany	+ 5.22
10	Ruthie Matthes	United States	+ 5.51
11	Chantal Daucourt	Switzerland	+ 7.25
12	Caroline Alexander	Great Britain	+ 7.26
13	Hedda zu Putlitz	Germany	+ 8.55
14	Silvia Rovira	Spain	+ 9.35
15	Louise Robinson	Great Britain	+ 9.58
16	Ann Trombley	United States	+ 10.18
17	Corine Dorland	Netherlands	+ 10.34
18	Laurence Leboucher	France	+ 11.14
19	Lesley Tomlinson	Canada	+ 11.19
20	Jimena Florit	Argentina	+ 11.24
21	Anna Baylis	Australia	+ 11.29
22	Ragnhild Kostøl	Norway	+ 12.26
23	Sophie Villeneuve	France	+ 13.07
24	Flor Marina Delgadillo	Colombia	+ 13.52
25	Erica Lynn Green	South Africa	+ 14.08
26	Hiroko Nambu	Japan	+ 16.49
27	Alexandra Yeung	Hong Kong	+ 22.05
28	Ma Yanping	China	+ 1 lap
29	Tarja Owens	Ireland	+ 1 lap
—	Susy Pryde	New Zealand	DNF

== See also ==
- Men's Cross Country Race
