= Ma Liyun =

Chinese BMX rider

Personal information
- Born: July 1, 1988 (age 38) Guangdong, China

Cycling career
- Sport: Cycling
Medal record
Women's BMX
Representing China
Asian Games
Gold medal – first place	2010 Guangzhou	Women's BMX race

Ma Liyun (simplified Chinese: 马丽芸; traditional Chinese: 馬麗芸; pinyin: Mǎ Lìyún; Cantonese Yale: Ma5 Lai6 Wan4; born July 1, 1988, in Guangdong) is a female Chinese BMX racer, who competed for Team China at the 2008 Summer Olympics.

Ma won a gold medal in the women's BMX race at the 2010 Asian Games.

== Sports career ==
- 2001 Nanxiong Xiongzhou Middle School Athletics Team (Sprint);
- 2004 Switched to BMX, Guangdong Provincial Cycling Team;
- 2005 National BMX Team for Intensified Training

== Major performances ==
- 2006 BMX National Champions Tournament - 1st/3rd dirt race;
- 2006 BMX Pacific Oceania Ranking Series - 3rd dirt race;
- 2007 BMX National Champions Tournament - 1st/1st dirt race;
- 2007 BMX Asian Championships - 1st dirt race
