= Anna Baylis =

Australian cross-country mountain biker

Personal information
- Full name: Anna Ellen Baylis
- Born: Anna Ellen Baylis; 16 December 1976 (age 49) Melbourne, Victoria, Australia
- Height: 172 cm (5 ft 8 in)

Cycling career
- Sport: Cycling
- Role: Life Coach

Anna Ellen Baylis (born 16 December 1976) is an Australian cross-country mountain biker.

Baylis participated in the 2000 Summer Olympics in Sydney coming 21st in the women's cross-country event. She also represented Australia at the 2002 Commonwealth Games in Manchester and completed the Hawaii Ironman in 2010.
