= Seung-hwan =

- Hangul: 승환
- RR: Seunghwan
- MR: Sŭnghwan

Seung-hwan is a Korean given name.

People with this name include:

== Entertainers ==
- Lee Seung-hwan (born 1965), South Korean singer and songwriter
- Shin Seung-hwan (born 1978), South Korean actor
- Jung Seung-hwan (singer) (born 1996), South Korean singer
- Baek Seung-hwan (born 1998), South Korean actor

== Sportspeople ==
- Ji Seung-hwan (cyclist) (born 1971), South Korean cyclist
- Ji Seung-hwan (born 1974), South Korean field hockey player
- Oh Seung-hwan (born 1982), South Korean relief pitcher
- Bang Seung-hwan (born 1983), South Korean football player
- Jung Seung-hwan (sledge hockey) (born 1988), South Korean sledge hockey player

== See also ==
- List of Korean given names
