= Cycling at the 2002 Asian Games – Women's points race =

Women's points race at the 2002 Asian Games
- Venue: Geumjeong Velodrome
- Date: 7 October 2002
- Competitors: 20 from 11 nations

Medalists
gold medal	Kim Yong-mi	South Korea
silver medal	Ayumu Otsuka	Japan
bronze medal	Santia Tri Kusuma	Indonesia

The women's 24 kilometres points race competition at the 2002 Asian Games was held on 7 October at the Geumjeong Velodrome.

== Schedule ==
All times are Korea Standard Time (UTC+09:00)

Date	Time	Event
Monday, 7 October 2002	11:25	Final

== Results ==
Legend

- DSQ — Disqualified

Rank	Athlete	Sprint												Laps		Total
Rank	Athlete	1	2	3	4	5	6	7	8	9	10	11	12	+	−	Total
1st place, gold medalist(s)	Kim Yong-mi (KOR)	5	5	5	5	2		2	2		5	5	2			38
2nd place, silver medalist(s)	Ayumu Otsuka (JPN)				2	1		5	5	5	3			10		31
3rd place, bronze medalist(s)	Santia Tri Kusuma (INA)					5	5		1	2		3	5			21
4	Monrudee Chapookam (THA)							3	3	3				10		19
5	Yang Limei (CHN)	2	1	2			2			1	2	2				12
6	Huang Ho-hsun (TPE)				3		3						1			7
7	Lan Hsiao-yun (TPE)		2	3				1								6
8	Alexandra Yeung (HKG)	1				3	1				1					6
9	Uyun Muzizah (INA)												3			3
9	Chanpeng Nontasin (THA)		3													3
11	Zheng Puxiang (CHN)			1	1											2
—	Park Won-soon (KOR)	3										1				DSQ
