= Cycling at the 2002 Asian Games – Men's 1 kilometre time trial =

Men's 1 kilometre time trial at the 2002 Asian Games
- Venue: Geumjeong Velodrome
- Date: 4 October 2002
- Competitors: 8 from 8 nations

Medalists
gold medal	Lin Chih-hsan	Chinese Taipei
silver medal	Keiichi Omori	Japan
bronze medal	Kim Chi-bum	South Korea

The men's 1 kilometre time trial competition at the 2002 Asian Games was held on 4 October at the Geumjeong Velodrome.

== Schedule ==
All times are Korea Standard Time (UTC+09:00)

Date	Time	Event
Friday, 4 October 2002	13:30	Final

== Records ==
Prior to this competition, the existing world, Asian and Games records were as follows.

World Record	Arnaud Tournant (FRA)	58.875	La Paz, Bolivia	10 October 2001
Asian Record	Toshiaki Fushimi (JPN)	1:02.158	Kunming, China	11 August 2002
Games Record	Ji Sung-hwan (KOR)	1:05.406	Bangkok, Thailand	14 December 1998

== Results ==
Legend

- DNS — Did not start

Rank	Athlete	Time	Notes
1st place, gold medalist(s)	Lin Chih-hsan (TPE)	1:05.470	
2nd place, silver medalist(s)	Keiichi Omori (JPN)	1:05.864	
3rd place, bronze medalist(s)	Kim Chi-bum (KOR)	1:07.129	
4	Yan Liheng (CHN)	1:07.738	
5	Hassan Ali Varposhti (IRI)	1:08.917	
6	Leung Chi Yin (HKG)	1:12.564	
7	Bryan Dimacali (PHI)	1:12.597	
—	Jorge Pereira (TMP)	DNS	
