= Massi–Kuwait Cycling Project =

Kuwaiti UCI Continental cycling team

Team information
- UCI code: KCP
- Registered: Kuwait
- Founded: 2015
- Discipline: Road
- Status: UCI Continental

Team name history
- 2015 2016–: Kuwait Cycling Project; Massi–Kuwait Cycling Project

Massi–Kuwait Cycling Project is a Kuwaiti UCI Continental cycling team established in 2015.

== Team roster ==
Rider	Date of birth
Jarrah Al-Mutairi (KUW)	11 March 1983 (age 43)
Abdulhadi Alajmi (KUW)	2 May 1995 (age 31)
Saied Jafer Alali (KUW)	29 October 1988 (age 37)
Anas Alkandari (KUW)	Unknown
Khaled Alkhalifah (KUW)	23 April 1995 (age 31)
Salman Alsaffar (KUW)	26 January 1989 (age 37)
Rubén Caseny (ESP)	13 September 1986 (age 39)
Jorge Ferrer (ESP)	14 February 1984 (age 42)

Rider	Date of birth
Jose Manuel Gutierrez (ESP)	4 May 1988 (age 38)
Oskar Malatsetxebarria (ESP)	22 March 1995 (age 31)
Ali Moslim (KUW)	1 November 1994 (age 31)
Alakari Othman (KUW)	3 January 1988 (age 38)
Hilari Redondo (ESP)	25 January 1994 (age 32)

== Major wins ==
2015
Kuwait National Road Race championships, Salman Alsaffar
Kuwait National Time Trial championships, Salman Alsaffar
Stage 3 Tour of Al Zubarah, Eugen Wacker
2016
Kuwait National Time Trial championships, Khaled Alkhalifah
