= Cycling at the 1998 Asian Games – Women's individual time trial =

Women's individual time trial at the 1998 Asian Games
- Venue: Phahonyothin Road
- Date: 10 December 1998
- Competitors: 11 from 7 nations

Medalists
gold medal	Zhao Haijuan	China
silver medal	Ma Huizhen	China
bronze medal	Ayumu Otsuka	Japan

The women's individual time trial competition at the 1998 Asian Games was held on 10 December.

== Schedule ==
All times are Indochina Time (UTC+07:00)

Date	Time	Event
Thursday, 10 December 1998	10:20	Final

== Results ==
Rank	Athlete	Time
1st place, gold medalist(s)	Zhao Haijuan (CHN)	35:17.55
2nd place, silver medalist(s)	Ma Huizhen (CHN)	35:54.01
3rd place, bronze medalist(s)	Ayumu Otsuka (JPN)	36:49.59
4	Choi Hyun-soon (KOR)	37:57.63
5	Banna Kamfoo (THA)	38:24.38
6	Shim Jung-hwa (KOR)	38:27.72
7	Fatma Galiulina (UZB)	38:54.76
8	Kaori Sakashita (JPN)	39:41.88
9	Skuntala Chantasit (THA)	39:52.61
10	Alexandra Yeung (HKG)	41:09.10
11	Lynn Dabbous (LIB)	44:38.28
