= Cycling at the 1998 Asian Games – Men's sprint =

Men's sprint at the 1998 Asian Games
- Venue: Huamark Velodrome
- Date: 14–16 December 1998
- Competitors: 9 from 6 nations

Medalists
gold medal	Yuichiro Kamiyama	Japan
silver medal	Noriaki Mabuchi	Japan
bronze medal	Hyun Byung-chul	South Korea

The men's sprint competition at the 1998 Asian Games was held from 14 to 16 December at Huamark Velodrome.

== Results ==
=== Qualifying ===
Rank	Athlete	Time	Notes
1	Yuichiro Kamiyama (JPN)	10.567	GR
2	Noriaki Mabuchi (JPN)	11.036	
3	Wu Hsien-tang (TPE)	11.111	
4	Hyun Byung-chul (KOR)	11.183	
5	Ti Chih-hung (TPE)	11.229	
6	Liu Yadong (CHN)	11.325	
7	Park Jong-seong (KOR)	11.364	
8	Alireza Farid-Jafarnejad (IRI)	11.540	
9	Adisak Wannasri (THA)	11.696	

=== Quarterfinals ===
==== Heat 1 ====
Rank	Athlete	Race 1	Race 2	Decider
1	Yuichiro Kamiyama (JPN)	11.548	11.731	
2	Alireza Farid-Jafarnejad (IRI)			

==== Heat 2 ====
Rank	Athlete	Race 1	Race 2	Decider
1	Hyun Byung-chul (KOR)	11.328	11.657	
2	Ti Chih-hung (TPE)			

==== Heat 3 ====
Rank	Athlete	Race 1	Race 2	Decider
1	Noriaki Mabuchi (JPN)	11.659		12.006
2	Park Jong-seong (KOR)		11.845	

==== Heat 4 ====
Rank	Athlete	Race 1	Race 2	Decider
1	Liu Yadong (CHN)	11.318	11.645	
2	Wu Hsien-tang (TPE)			

=== Semifinals ===
==== Heat 1 ====
Rank	Athlete	Race 1	Race 2	Decider
1	Yuichiro Kamiyama (JPN)	10.857	11.216	
2	Liu Yadong (CHN)			

==== Heat 2 ====
Rank	Athlete	Race 1	Race 2	Decider
1	Noriaki Mabuchi (JPN)	10.734		10.957
2	Hyun Byung-chul (KOR)		11.005	

=== Finals ===
==== Bronze ====
Rank	Athlete	Race 1	Race 2	Decider
3rd place, bronze medalist(s)	Hyun Byung-chul (KOR)	11.835	11.747	
4	Liu Yadong (CHN)			

==== Gold ====
Rank	Athlete	Race 1	Race 2	Decider
1st place, gold medalist(s)	Yuichiro Kamiyama (JPN)	11.346	11.447	
2nd place, silver medalist(s)	Noriaki Mabuchi (JPN)			
