= Cycling at the 2002 Asian Games – Men's team sprint =

Men's team sprint at the 2002 Asian Games
- Venue: Geumjeong Velodrome
- Date: 4–5 October 2002
- Competitors: 24 from 8 nations

Medalists
gold medal	Japan; Yuichiro Kamiyama, Harutomo Watanabe, Takashi Kaneko
silver medal	South Korea; Yang Hee-jin, Cho Hyun-ok, Kim Chi-bum
bronze medal	Chinese Taipei; Lin Kun-hung, Chen Keng-hsien, Lin Chih-hsan

The men's team sprint competition at the 2002 Asian Games was held on 4 and 5 October at the Geumjeong Velodrome.

== Schedule ==
All times are Korea Standard Time (UTC+09:00)

Date	Time	Event
Friday, 4 October 2002	16:30	Qualification
Saturday, 5 October 2002	14:30	Finals

== Results ==
Legend

- DNS — Did not start

=== Qualification ===
Rank	Team	Time
1	Japan (JPN); Yuichiro Kamiyama; Harutomo Watanabe; Takashi Kaneko	1:01.792
2	South Korea (KOR); Yang Hee-jin; Cho Hyun-ok; Kim Chi-bum	1:02.798
3	Chinese Taipei (TPE); Lin Kun-hung; Chen Keng-hsien; Lin Chih-hsan	1:03.665
4	China (CHN); Gao Zhiguo; Yan Liheng; Zhang Lei	1:03.688
5	Malaysia (MAS); Josiah Ng; Ghaffuan Ghazali; Fairuz Izni Abdul Ghani	1:04.860
6	Indonesia (INA); Wawan Setyobudi; Samai Amari; Iwan Kartiwan	1:05.912
7	Hong Kong (HKG); Chester Lam; Leung Chi Hang; Leung Chi Yin	1:08.280
—	India (IND); Hitraj Singh; Raj Paul Chauhan; Premjit Singh	DNS

=== Finals ===
==== Final (3~4) ====
Rank	Team	Time
3rd place, bronze medalist(s)	Chinese Taipei (TPE); Lin Kun-hung; Chen Keng-hsien; Lin Chih-hsan	1:02.415
4	China (CHN); Gao Zhiguo; Yan Liheng; Zhang Lei	1:03.172

==== Final (1~2) ====
Rank	Team	Time
1st place, gold medalist(s)	Japan (JPN); Yuichiro Kamiyama; Harutomo Watanabe; Takashi Kaneko	1:00.927
2nd place, silver medalist(s)	South Korea (KOR); Yang Hee-jin; Cho Hyun-ok; Kim Chi-bum	1:01.846
