= Cycling at the 1998 Asian Games – Women's cross-country =

Women's cross-country at the 1998 Asian Games
- Venue: Khao Yai Rimthan Resort
- Date: 8 December 1998
- Competitors: 8 from 6 nations

Medalists
gold medal	Ma Yanping	China
silver medal	Kanako Kobayashi	Japan
bronze medal	Chantana Singupatham	Thailand

The women's cross-country cycling competition at the 1998 Asian Games in Khao Yai National Park, Nakhon Ratchasima Province, was held on 8 December at the Khao Yai Rimthan Resort.

== Schedule ==
All times are Indochina Time (UTC+07:00)

Date	Time	Event
Tuesday, 8 December 1998	08:00	Final

== Results ==
Legend

- DNS — Did not start

Rank	Athlete	Time
1st place, gold medalist(s)	Ma Yanping (CHN)	2:07:28
2nd place, silver medalist(s)	Kanako Kobayashi (JPN)	2:11:45
3rd place, bronze medalist(s)	Chantana Singupatham (THA)	2:17:34
4	Alexandra Yeung (HKG)	2:23:46
5	Liu Chunxiu (CHN)	2:31:10
—	Lynn Dabbous (LIB)	DNS
—	Panna Deekampa (THA)	DNS
—	Nguyễn Thị Lê Hương (VIE)	DNS
