= Cycling at the 1998 Asian Games – Men's individual pursuit =

Men's individual pursuit at the 1998 Asian Games
- Venue: Huamark Velodrome
- Date: 14–15 December 1998
- Competitors: 18 from 11 nations

Medalists
gold medal	Vadim Kravchenko	Kazakhstan
silver medal	Noriyuki Iijima	Japan
bronze medal	Eugen Wacker	Kyrgyzstan

The men's 4 km individual pursuit competition at the 1998 Asian Games was held on 14 and 15 December at Huamark Velodrome.

== Schedule ==
All times are Indochina Time (UTC+07:00)

Date	Time	Event
Monday, 14 December 1998	08:00	Qualification
Monday, 14 December 1998	08:00	Semifinals
Tuesday, 15 December 1998	08:00	Finals

== Results ==
Legend

- DNS — Did not start

=== Qualification ===
Rank	Athlete	Time	Notes
1	Vadim Kravchenko (KAZ)	4:44.647	
2	Eugen Wacker (KGZ)	4:45.414	
3	Noriyuki Iijima (JPN)	4:46.170	
4	Shi Guijun (CHN)	4:51.375	
5	Damir Iratov (UZB)	4:51.935	
6	Wang Zhengquan (CHN)	4:53.224	
7	Toshifumi Kodama (JPN)	4:53.335	
8	Vladimir Bushanskiy (KAZ)	4:55.204	
9	Wong Kam Po (HKG)	4:56.008	
10	Ghader Mizbani (IRI)	4:57.148	
11	Amir Zargari (IRI)	4:59.170	
12	Ryu Jae-eun (KOR)	5:02.607	
13	Li Sai Hong (HKG)	5:04.589	
14	Panupong Maneepong (THA)	5:05.697	
—	Chen Keng-hsien (TPE)	DNS	
—	Chen Teng-tien (TPE)	DNS	
—	Ali Sayed Darwish (UAE)	DNS	
—	Thongchai Wangardjaingam (THA)	DNS	

=== Semifinals ===
==== Heat 1 ====
Rank	Athlete	Time	Notes
1	Noriyuki Iijima (JPN)	4.44.793	
2	Eugen Wacker (KGZ)	4.48.662	

==== Heat 2 ====
Rank	Athlete	Time	Notes
1	Vadim Kravchenko (KAZ)	4.42.799	
2	Shi Guijun (CHN)	Overlapped	

=== Finals ===
==== Bronze ====
Rank	Athlete	Time	Notes
3rd place, bronze medalist(s)	Eugen Wacker (KGZ)	4.47.347	
4	Shi Guijun (CHN)	4.53.475	

==== Gold ====
Rank	Athlete	Time	Notes
1st place, gold medalist(s)	Vadim Kravchenko (KAZ)	4.42.799	
2nd place, silver medalist(s)	Noriyuki Iijima (JPN)	4.45.215	
