= Cycling at the 2002 Asian Games – Men's madison =

Men's madison at the 2002 Asian Games
- Venue: Geumjeong Velodrome
- Date: 8 October 2002
- Competitors: 16 from 8 nations

Medalists
gold medal	Suh Seok-kyu; Cho Ho-sung	South Korea
silver medal	Makoto Iijima; Shinichi Fukushima	Japan
bronze medal	Wong Kam Po; Ho Siu Lun	Hong Kong

The men's 40 km madison competition at the 2002 Asian Games was held on 8 October at the Geumjeong Velodrome.

== Schedule ==
All times are Korea Standard Time (UTC+09:00)

Date	Time	Event
Tuesday, 8 October 2002	10:40	Final

== Results ==
Legend

- DNF — Did not finish
- DNS — Did not start

Rank	Team	Sprint								Laps down	Total
Rank	Team	1	2	3	4	5	6	7	8	Laps down	Total
1st place, gold medalist(s)	South Korea (KOR); Suh Seok-kyu; Cho Ho-sung	5	5	5	3	5	5	5	5	+1	38
2nd place, silver medalist(s)	Japan (JPN); Makoto Iijima; Shinichi Fukushima		1			3	3	1	3	+1	11
3rd place, bronze medalist(s)	Hong Kong (HKG); Wong Kam Po; Ho Siu Lun	2	3	3	5			3	2		18
4	Kazakhstan (KAZ); Sergey Lavrenenko; Vladimir Bushanskiy	1	2	2	2	1	1	2	1		12
5	Iran (IRI); Amir Zargari; Alireza Haghi	3		1	1	2	2				9
—	Philippines (PHI); Paterno Curtan; Victor Espiritu										DNF
—	Chinese Taipei (TPE); Chen Chien-chung; Tsai Shao-yu										DNF
—	Uzbekistan (UZB); Damir Iratov; Yuriy Plyukhin										DNS
