= Ann Trombley =

American cyclist

Personal information
- Born: November 22, 1963 (age 62) Saginaw, Michigan, U.S.

Sport
- Country: United States
- Sport: Cycling

Ann Trombley (born November 22, 1963) is an American cyclist. She competed at the 2000 Summer Olympics in Sydney, in the women's cross-country. Trombley was born in Saginaw, Michigan.
