= Cycling at the 2002 Asian Games – Women's individual time trial =

Women's individual time trial at the 2002 Asian Games
- Venue: Busan Road Cycle Race Stadium
- Date: 30 September 2002
- Competitors: 10 from 10 nations

Medalists
gold medal	Li Meifang	China
silver medal	Ayumu Otsuka	Japan
bronze medal	Lee Eun-joo	South Korea

The women's 24.2 km individual time trial competition at the 2002 Asian Games was held on 30 September at the Road Cycle Race Stadium.

== Schedule ==
All times are Korea Standard Time (UTC+09:00)

Date	Time	Event
Monday, 30 September 2002	10:00	Final

== Results ==
Legend

- DNS — Did not start

Rank	Athlete	Time
1st place, gold medalist(s)	Li Meifang (CHN)	34:24.82
2nd place, silver medalist(s)	Ayumu Otsuka (JPN)	35:31.31
3rd place, bronze medalist(s)	Lee Eun-joo (KOR)	35:38.65
4	Fatma Galiulina (UZB)	37:07.30
5	Alexandra Yeung (HKG)	37:21.16
6	Huang Ho-hsun (TPE)	37:42.77
7	Monrudee Chapookam (THA)	38:49.14
8	Hoàng Thị Thanh Tân (VIE)	39:20.76
9	Marites Bitbit (PHI)	39:32.12
—	Rameshwori Devi (IND)	DNS
