= Cycling at the 2002 Asian Games – Men's cross-country =

Men's cross-country at the 2002 Asian Games
- Venue: Gijang Mountain Bike Race Stadium
- Date: 13 October 2002
- Competitors: 18 from 9 nations

Medalists
gold medal	Kenji Takeya	Japan
silver medal	Zhu Yongbiao	China
bronze medal	Li Fuyu	China

The men's cross-country competition at the 2002 Asian Games in Gijang County was held on 13 October at the Gijang Mountain Bike Race Stadium.

== Schedule ==
All times are Korea Standard Time (UTC+09:00)

Date	Time	Event
Sunday, 13 October 2002	10:00	Final

== Results ==
Legend

- DNF — Did not finish
- DNS — Did not start

Rank	Athlete	Time
1st place, gold medalist(s)	Kenji Takeya (JPN)	1:47:03
2nd place, silver medalist(s)	Zhu Yongbiao (CHN)	1:49:36
3rd place, bronze medalist(s)	Li Fuyu (CHN)	1:49:37
4	Raita Suzuki (JPN)	1:51:06
5	Yevgeniy Yakovlev (KAZ)	1:53:21
6	Eusebio Quinones (PHI)	1:58:37
7	Frederick Feliciano (PHI)	2:01:37
8	Cheng Cheuk Chun (HKG)	2:02:31
9	Shin Bong-chul (KOR)	2:04:38
10	Surajit Jirojwong (THA)	2:05:38
11	Alexandr Dyachenko (KAZ)	–1 lap
11	Kim Byung-hyuk (KOR)	−1 lap
11	Chan Chun Hing (HKG)	−1 lap
14	Boldbaataryn Bold-Erdene (MGL)	−2 laps
—	Tawatchai Masae (THA)	DNF
—	Tümen-Ölziin Davaatogtokh (MGL)	DNS
—	Ahad Kazemi (IRI)	DNS
—	Ghader Mizbani (IRI)	DNS
