= Cycling at the 1998 Asian Games – Women's downhill =

Women's downhill at the 1998 Asian Games
- Venue: Khao Yai Rimthan Resort
- Date: 7 December 1998
- Competitors: 9 from 7 nations

Medalists
gold medal	Sachiko Kamakura	Japan
silver medal	Mami Masuda	Japan
bronze medal	Chen Ju-miao	Chinese Taipei

The women's downhill competition at the 1998 Asian Games in Khao Yai National Park, Nakhon Ratchasima Province was held on 7 December at the Khao Yai Rimthan Resort.

== Schedule ==
All times are Indochina Time (UTC+07:00)

Date	Time	Event
Monday, 7 December 1998	14:00	Final

== Results ==
Legend

- DNS — Did not start

Rank	Athlete	Time
1st place, gold medalist(s)	Sachiko Kamakura (JPN)	4:26.49
2nd place, silver medalist(s)	Mami Masuda (JPN)	4:44.15
3rd place, bronze medalist(s)	Chen Ju-miao (TPE)	4:54.18
4	Liu Hsiang-lan (TPE)	5:12.47
5	Liu Chunxiu (CHN)	5:33.63
6	Kanittha Pratom (THA)	7:30.29
—	Nguyễn Thị Lê Hương (VIE)	DNS
—	Alexandra Yeung (HKG)	DNS
—	Lynn Dabbous (LIB)	DNS
