= Cycling at the 2006 Asian Games – Men's individual time trial =

Men's individual time trial at the 2006 Asian Games
- Venue: Al-Khor Road Course
- Date: 5 December 2006
- Competitors: 23 from 23 nations

Medalists
gold medal	Song Baoqing	China
silver medal	Eugen Wacker	Kyrgyzstan
bronze medal	Andrey Mizurov	Kazakhstan

The men's 44.8 km individual time trial competition at the 2006 Asian Games was held on 5 December at the Al-Khor Road Course.

== Schedule ==
All times are Arabia Standard Time (UTC+03:00)

Date	Time	Event
Tuesday, 5 December 2006	14:00	Final

== Results ==
Legend

- DNS — Did not start

Rank	Athlete	Time
1st place, gold medalist(s)	Song Baoqing (CHN)	55:33.55
2nd place, silver medalist(s)	Eugen Wacker (KGZ)	56:16.83
3rd place, bronze medalist(s)	Andrey Mizurov (KAZ)	56:51.92
4	Fumiyuki Beppu (JPN)	57:48.35
5	Ghader Mizbani (IRI)	58:09.35
6	Joo Hyun-wook (KOR)	59:24.30
7	Mai Công Hiếu (VIE)	59:39.11
8	Tang Wang Yip (HKG)	1:00:01.27
9	Vladimir Tuychiev (UZB)	1:00:24.71
10	Tonton Susanto (INA)	1:01:12.49
11	Arnel Quirimit (PHI)	1:01:36.65
12	Jamsrangiin Ölzii-Orshikh (MGL)	1:01:58.22
13	Bader Al-Yasin (KSA)	1:02:53.51
14	Taha Sayed Alawi (BRN)	1:03:26.45
15	Shahrulneeza Razali (MAS)	1:05:01.08
16	Radhwan Al-Moraqab (QAT)	1:05:34.14
17	Dilsher Ali (PAK)	1:06:36.25
18	Yassir Ziaoddin (IRQ)	1:06:37.30
19	Saddam Al-Saayo (SYR)	1:11:02.39
20	Kwan Chung Yin (MAC)	1:12:33.55
21	Meemanage Perera (SRI)	1:16:05.84
—	Samir Liane (LIB)	DNS
—	Badr Mirza (UAE)	DNS
