= Chen Chiung-yi =

Taiwanese cyclist

Chen Chiung-Yi
Personal information
- Full name: Chen Chiung-Yi
- Born: 7 December 1976 (age 49) Taiwan
- Height: 165 cm (5 ft 5 in)
- Weight: 59 kg (130 lb)

Cycling career
- Sport: Cycling
- Discipline: Road cycling

Chen Chiung-Yi (Chinese: 陳瓊宜; born 7 November 1976) is a road cyclist from Taiwan. She represented her nation as Chinese Taipei at the 2000 Summer Olympics in the women's road race.
