= Cycling at the 2002 Asian Games – Men's points race =

Men's points race at the 2002 Asian Games
- Venue: Geumjeong Velodrome
- Date: 7 October 2002
- Competitors: 20 from 11 nations

Medalists
gold medal	Cho Ho-sung	South Korea
silver medal	Ma Yajun	China
bronze medal	Noriyuki Iijima	Japan

The men's 30 km points race competition at the 2002 Asian Games was held on 7 October at the Geumjeong Velodrome.

== Schedule ==
All times are Korea Standard Time (UTC+09:00)

Date	Time	Event
Monday, 7 October 2002	19:50	Final

== Results ==
Rank	Athlete	Sprint															Laps		Total
Rank	Athlete	1	2	3	4	5	6	7	8	9	10	11	12	13	14	15	+	−	Total
1st place, gold medalist(s)	Cho Ho-sung (KOR)			2		5	5	5	3	5		5	3	5			10		48
2nd place, silver medalist(s)	Ma Yajun (CHN)	3			5			2							5	5	10		30
3rd place, bronze medalist(s)	Noriyuki Iijima (JPN)					2	3		5		1		5			2	10		28
4	Sergey Lavrenenko (KAZ)				2	1	2	1	2	3		2		1	3	1	10		28
5	Abbas Saeidi Tanha (IRI)		5		3		1		1	1		3			2		10		26
6	Suwandra (INA)	5						3			3			3			10		24
7	Wong Kam Po (HKG)			5	1	3				2	5		2	2		3			23
8	Ho Siu Lun (HKG)			1													10		11
9	Moezeddin Seyed-Rezaei (IRI)	1	2	3							2								8
10	Taiji Nishitani (JPN)		3																3
11	Liu Chin-feng (TPE)	2																	2
12	Kohar (INA)											1							1
12	Paterno Curtan (PHI)														1				1
12	Suh Seok-kyu (KOR)												1						1
12	Sergey Tretyakov (KAZ)		1																1
16	Shi Guijun (CHN)																		0
16	Damir Iratov (UZB)																		0
16	Victor Espiritu (PHI)																		0
16	Ghaffuan Ghazali (MAS)																		0
16	Tsai Shao-yu (TPE)																		0
