= Cycling at the 2002 Asian Games – Women's sprint =

Women's sprint at the 2002 Asian Games
- Venue: Geumjeong Velodrome
- Date: 4–8 October 2002
- Competitors: 8 from 4 nations

Medalists
gold medal	Li Na	China
silver medal	Maya Tachikawa	Japan
bronze medal	Ku Hyun-jin	South Korea

The women's sprint competition at the 2002 Asian Games was held from 4 to 8 October at the Geumjeong Velodrome.

== Schedule ==
All times are Korea Standard Time (UTC+09:00)

Date	Time	Event
Friday, 4 October 2002	10:35	200 metres flying start
Saturday, 5 October 2002	10:30	1/4 finals
Monday, 7 October 2002	18:20	Semifinals
Monday, 7 October 2002	18:40	Final (5~8)
Tuesday, 8 October 2002	13:55	Finals

== Records ==
Prior to this competition, the existing world, Asian and Games records were as follows.

World Record	Olga Slyusareva (RUS)	10.831	Moscow, Russia	25 April 1993
Asian Record	Wang Yan (CHN)	11.172	Maebashi, Japan	6 June 1999
Games Record	Wang Yan (CHN)	11.873	Bangkok, Thailand	14 December 1998

== Results ==
Legend

- DNS — Did not start

=== 200 metres flying start ===
Rank	Athlete	Time	Notes
1	Li Na (CHN)	11.675	GR
2	Maya Tachikawa (JPN)	11.918	
3	Tian Fang (CHN)	11.939	
4	Ku Hyun-jin (KOR)	12.093	
5	Lee Jong-ae (KOR)	12.124	
6	Lu Yi-wen (TPE)	12.254	
7	Tomoko Endo (JPN)	12.280	
8	Wu Fang-ju (TPE)	12.352	

=== 1/4 finals ===
==== Heat 1 ====
Rank	Athlete	Race 1	Race 2	Race 3
1	Li Na (CHN)	12.826	12.881	
2	Wu Fang-ju (TPE)			

==== Heat 2 ====
Rank	Athlete	Race 1	Race 2	Race 3
1	Maya Tachikawa (JPN)	12.652	12.932	
2	Tomoko Endo (JPN)			

==== Heat 3 ====
Rank	Athlete	Race 1	Race 2	Race 3
1	Tian Fang (CHN)	13.305	13.023	
2	Lu Yi-wen (TPE)			

==== Heat 4 ====
Rank	Athlete	Race 1	Race 2	Race 3
1	Ku Hyun-jin (KOR)	13.382	12.911	
2	Lee Jong-ae (KOR)			

=== Final (5~8) ===
Rank	Athlete	Time
1	Tomoko Endo (JPN)	12.656
2	Lu Yi-wen (TPE)	
3	Wu Fang-ju (TPE)	
4	Lee Jong-ae (KOR)	DNS

=== Semifinals ===
==== Heat 1 ====
Rank	Athlete	Race 1	Race 2	Race 3
1	Li Na (CHN)		12.536	12.326
2	Ku Hyun-jin (KOR)	12.510		

==== Heat 2 ====
Rank	Athlete	Race 1	Race 2	Race 3
1	Maya Tachikawa (JPN)		12.926	13.040
2	Tian Fang (CHN)	13.113		

=== Finals ===
==== Final (3~4) ====
Rank	Athlete	Race 1	Race 2	Race 3
1	Ku Hyun-jin (KOR)	12.770	12.534	
2	Tian Fang (CHN)			

==== Final (1~2) ====
Rank	Athlete	Race 1	Race 2	Race 3
1	Li Na (CHN)	12.604	12.202	
2	Maya Tachikawa (JPN)			

== Final standing ==
Rank	Athlete
1st place, gold medalist(s)	Li Na (CHN)
2nd place, silver medalist(s)	Maya Tachikawa (JPN)
3rd place, bronze medalist(s)	Ku Hyun-jin (KOR)
4	Tian Fang (CHN)
5	Tomoko Endo (JPN)
6	Lu Yi-wen (TPE)
7	Wu Fang-ju (TPE)
8	Lee Jong-ae (KOR)
