= Cycling at the 2010 Asian Games – Women's BMX racing =

Women's racing at the 2010 Asian Games
- Venue: Guangzhou Velodrome
- Date: 19 November 2010
- Competitors: 4 from 2 nations

Medalists
gold medal	Ma Liyun	China
silver medal	Ayaka Miwa	Japan
bronze medal	Yue Cong	China

The women's BMX racing competition at the 2010 Asian Games in Guangzhou was held on 19 November at the Guangzhou Velodrome.

== Schedule ==
All times are China Standard Time (UTC+08:00)

Date	Time	Event
Friday, 19 November 2010	11:30	Qualifying
Friday, 19 November 2010	12:30	Final

== Results ==
=== Qualifying ===
Rank	Athlete	Run 1		Run 2		Run 3		Total
Rank	Athlete	Time	Pts	Time	Pts	Time	Pts	Total
1	Ma Liyun (CHN)	38.651	1	37.131	1	37.295	1	3
2	Ayaka Miwa (JPN)	39.377	2	38.985	3	38.146	2	7
3	Yue Cong (CHN)	53.471	4	38.833	2	38.427	3	9
4	Miki Iibata (JPN)	41.735	3	2:23.660	4	38.772	4	11

=== Final ===
Rank	Athlete	Time
1st place, gold medalist(s)	Ma Liyun (CHN)	36.662
2nd place, silver medalist(s)	Ayaka Miwa (JPN)	37.802
3rd place, bronze medalist(s)	Yue Cong (CHN)	37.916
