= Cycling at the 2014 Asian Games – Men's individual time trial =

Men's individual time trial at the 2014 Asian Games
- Venue: Songdo Road Cycling Course
- Date: 27 September 2014
- Competitors: 21 from 21 nations

Medalists
gold medal	Alexey Lutsenko	Kazakhstan
silver medal	Eugen Wacker	Kyrgyzstan
bronze medal	Hossein Askari	Iran

The men's 42 kilometres individual time trial competition at the 2014 Asian Games was held on 27 September.

== Schedule ==
All times are Korea Standard Time (UTC+09:00)

Date	Time	Event
Saturday, 27 September 2014	14:00	Final

== Results ==
Rank	Athlete	Time
1st place, gold medalist(s)	Alexey Lutsenko (KAZ)	50:28.78
2nd place, silver medalist(s)	Eugen Wacker (KGZ)	51:01.69
3rd place, bronze medalist(s)	Hossein Askari (IRI)	51:19.77
4	Fumiyuki Beppu (JPN)	52:08.99
5	Muradjan Khalmuratov (UZB)	52:32.04
6	Choe Hyeong-min (KOR)	52:50.49
7	Tuulkhangain Tögöldör (MGL)	53:04.09
8	Trịnh Đức Tâm (VIE)	53:56.01
9	Fauzan Ahmad Lutfi (MAS)	54:10.21
10	Wang Meiyin (CHN)	54:12.49
11	Cheung King Lok (HKG)	54:46.59
12	Feng Chun-kai (TPE)	55:03.85
13	Mark Galedo (PHI)	55:45.91
14	Ryan Ariehaan Hilmant (INA)	56:20.02
15	Ahmed Al-Mansoori (UAE)	57:40.10
16	Abdelrahman Jarboua (QAT)	58:16.83
17	Röwşen Amangeldiýew (TKM)	59:25.69
18	Mohammed Al-Mushaykhis (KSA)	1:00:27.60
19	Ali Moslim (KUW)	1:00:55.22
20	Ieong Ngok Tong (MAC)	1:03:35.95
21	Antonio Fernandes Viana (TLS)	1:06:08.69
