= Cycling at the 2002 Asian Games – Women's 500 metres time trial =

Women's 500 metres time trial at the 2002 Asian Games
- Venue: Geumjeong Velodrome
- Date: 4 October 2002
- Competitors: 6 from 6 nations

Medalists
gold medal	Jiang Yonghua	China
silver medal	Sayuri Osuga	Japan
bronze medal	Lee Jong-ae	South Korea

The women's 500 m time trial competition at the 2002 Asian Games was held on 4 October at the Geumjeong Velodrome.

== Schedule ==
All times are Korea Standard Time (UTC+09:00)

Date	Time	Event
Friday, 4 October 2002	14:30	Final

== Records ==
Prior to this competition, the existing world, Asian and Games records were as follows.

World Record	Jiang Yonghua (CHN)	34.000	Kunming, China	11 August 2002
Asian Record	Jiang Yonghua (CHN)	34.000	Kunming, China	11 August 2002
Games Record	—	—	—	—

== Results ==
Legend

- DNS — Did not start

Rank	Athlete	Time	Notes
1st place, gold medalist(s)	Jiang Yonghua (CHN)	35.304	GR
2nd place, silver medalist(s)	Sayuri Osuga (JPN)	36.030	
3rd place, bronze medalist(s)	Lee Jong-ae (KOR)	37.498	
4	Santia Tri Kusuma (INA)	37.817	
5	Lu Yi-wen (TPE)	38.224	
—	Rameshwori Devi (IND)	DNS	
