= Cycling at the 2010 Asian Games – Men's individual time trial =

Men's individual time trial at the 2010 Asian Games
- Venue: Guangzhou Triathlon Venue
- Date: 20 November 2010
- Competitors: 20 from 20 nations

Medalists
| gold medal | Choe Hyeong-min | South Korea |
| silver medal | Eugen Wacker | Kyrgyzstan |
| bronze medal | Hossein Askari | Iran |

The men's 53.4 kilometres individual time trial competition at the 2010 Asian Games was held on 20 November.

== Schedule ==
All times are China Standard Time (UTC+08:00)

| Date | Time | Event |
|---|---|---|
| Saturday, 20 November 2010 | 10:00 | Final |

== Results ==
| Rank | Athlete | Time |
|---|---|---|
| 1st place, gold medalist(s) | Choe Hyeong-min (KOR) | 1:08:16.12 |
| 2nd place, silver medalist(s) | Eugen Wacker (KGZ) | 1:08:26.91 |
| 3rd place, bronze medalist(s) | Hossein Askari (IRI) | 1:08:48.49 |
| 4 | Muradjan Khalmuratov (UZB) | 1:09:21.29 |
| 5 | Cheung King Lok (HKG) | 1:09:23.66 |
| 6 | Andrey Mizurov (KAZ) | 1:09:24.89 |
| 7 | Kazuhiro Mori (JPN) | 1:11:44.60 |
| 8 | Tuulkhangain Tögöldör (MGL) | 1:12:19.47 |
| 9 | Ng Yong Li (MAS) | 1:12:25.16 |
| 10 | Ji Xitao (CHN) | 1:12:25.83 |
| 11 | Feng Chun-kai (TPE) | 1:12:33.79 |
| 12 | Tonton Susanto (INA) | 1:12:35.55 |
| 13 | Mai Công Hiếu (VIE) | 1:13:20.85 |
| 14 | Bader Al-Yasin (KSA) | 1:15:37.17 |
| 15 | Sombir (IND) | 1:16:45.24 |
| 16 | Lloyd Reynante (PHI) | 1:17:20.63 |
| 17 | Ahmed Al-Bardiny (QAT) | 1:17:29.23 |
| 18 | Choi Heng Wa (MAC) | 1:19:14.54 |
| 19 | Laxman Wijerathna (SRI) | 1:21:13.68 |
| 20 | Mohammed Al-Murawwi (UAE) | 1:24:55.68 |
