= Cycling at the 1998 Asian Games – Men's cross-country =

Men's cross-country at the 1998 Asian Games
- Venue: Khao Yai Rimthan Resort
- Date: 8 December 1998
- Competitors: 14 from 9 nations

Medalists
gold medal	Akihito Udagawa	Japan
silver medal	Surajit Jirojwong	Thailand
bronze medal	Li Fuyu	China

The men's cross-country competition at the 1998 Asian Games in Khao Yai National Park, Nakhon Ratchasima Province was held on 8 December at the Khao Yai Rimthan Resort.

== Schedule ==
All times are Indochina Time (UTC+07:00)

Date	Time	Event
Tuesday, 8 December 1998	10:00	Final

== Results ==
Legend

- DNS — Did not start

Rank	Athlete	Time
1st place, gold medalist(s)	Akihito Udagawa (JPN)	2:05:07
2nd place, silver medalist(s)	Surajit Jirojwong (THA)	2:12:00
3rd place, bronze medalist(s)	Li Fuyu (CHN)	2:13:10
4	Ma Ye (CHN)	2:14:38
5	Man Wai Chung (HKG)	2:16:12
6	Joo Dae-young (KOR)	2:18:08
7	Jung Hyung-rae (KOR)	2:19:43
8	Placido Valdez (PHI)	2:25:59
9	Meesak Pakchiyapoom (THA)	2:28:28
10	Ruel Casaljay (PHI)	2:36:29
—	Brian Cook (HKG)	DNS
—	Filipe Luis Alves (MAC)	DNS
—	Hamdani Hj Besar (BRU)	DNS
—	Gürdorjiin Ankhbayar (MGL)	DNS
