= Hiroko Nambu =

Japanese cyclist

Personal information
- Born: 8 October 1968 (age 58)

Cycling career
- Sport: Cycling

Hiroko Nambu (南部 博子, Nanbu Hiroko; born 8 October 1968) is a Japanese cyclist. She competed in the women's cross-country mountain biking event at the 2000 Summer Olympics.
