= Cycling at the 1998 Asian Games – Men's 1 kilometre time trial =

Men's 1 kilometre time trial at the 1998 Asian Games
- Venue: Huamark Velodrome
- Date: 14 December 1998
- Competitors: 9 from 9 nations

Medalists
gold medal	Ji Sung-hwan	South Korea
silver medal	Takanobu Jumonji	Japan
bronze medal	Chen Keng-hsien	Chinese Taipei

The men's 1 kilometre time trial competition at the 1998 Asian Games was held on 14 December at Huamark Velodrome.

== Schedule ==
All times are Indochina Time (UTC+07:00)

Date	Time	Event
Monday, 14 December 1998	08:00	Final

== Results ==
Legend

- DNS — Did not start

Rank	Athlete	Time	Notes
1st place, gold medalist(s)	Ji Sung-hwan (KOR)	1:05.406	GR
2nd place, silver medalist(s)	Takanobu Jumonji (JPN)	1:07.011	
3rd place, bronze medalist(s)	Chen Keng-hsien (TPE)	1:08.364	
4	Liu Yadong (CHN)	1:08.708	
5	Alireza Farid-Jafarnejad (IRI)	1:08.851	
6	Panupong Maneepong (THA)	1:12.126	
7	Alexandr Nadobenko (KAZ)	1:12.209	
8	Li Sai Hong (HKG)	1:14.008	
—	Konstantin Gamman (KGZ)	DNS	
