= Cycling at the 2002 Asian Games – Men's sprint =

Men's sprint at the 2002 Asian Games
- Venue: Geumjeong Velodrome
- Date: 4–8 October 2002
- Competitors: 15 from 8 nations

Medalists
gold medal	Takashi Kaneko	Japan
silver medal	Josiah Ng	Malaysia
bronze medal	Akihiro Isezaki	Japan

The men's sprint competition at the 2002 Asian Games was held from 4 to 8 October at the Geumjeong Velodrome.

== Schedule ==
All times are Korea Standard Time (UTC+09:00)

Date	Time	Event
Friday, 4 October 2002	10:00	200 metres flying start
Saturday, 5 October 2002	10:00	1/8 finals
Saturday, 5 October 2002	16:00	Repechages
Monday, 7 October 2002	10:00	1/4 finals
Monday, 7 October 2002	10:45	Final (9~12)
Monday, 7 October 2002	18:10	Semifinals
Monday, 7 October 2002	18:30	Final (5~8)
Tuesday, 8 October 2002	13:40	Finals

== Records ==
Prior to this competition, the existing world, Asian and Games records were as follows.

World Record	Curt Harnett (CAN)	9.865	Bogotá, Colombia	28 September 1995
Asian Record	Akihiro Isezaki (JPN)	10.234	Maebashi, Japan	17 June 2000
Games Record	Yuichiro Kamiyama (JPN)	10.567	Bangkok, Thailand	14 December 1998

== Results ==
Legend

- DNS — Did not start

=== 200 metres flying start ===
Rank	Athlete	Time	Notes
1	Takashi Kaneko (JPN)	10.585	
2	Kim Hyung-il (KOR)	10.595	
3	Josiah Ng (MAS)	10.609	
4	Akihiro Isezaki (JPN)	10.645	
5	Gao Zhiguo (CHN)	10.686	
6	Cho Hyun-ok (KOR)	10.691	
7	Wu Hsien-tang (TPE)	10.723	
8	Ghaffuan Ghazali (MAS)	10.807	
9	Zhang Lei (CHN)	10.833	
10	Huang Chih-ying (TPE)	11.131	
11	Agus Yulianto (INA)	11.140	
12	Chester Lam (HKG)	11.279	
13	Bryan Dimacali (PHI)	11.537	
14	Domino Chau (HKG)	11.871	
—	Iwan Kartiwan (INA)	DNS	

=== 1/8 finals ===
==== Heat 1 ====
Rank	Athlete	Time
1	Takashi Kaneko (JPN)	11.451
2	Chester Lam (HKG)	

==== Heat 2 ====
Rank	Athlete	Time
1	Kim Hyung-il (KOR)	10.915
2	Agus Yulianto (INA)	

==== Heat 3 ====
Rank	Athlete	Time
1	Josiah Ng (MAS)	11.663
2	Huang Chih-ying (TPE)	

==== Heat 4 ====
Rank	Athlete	Time
1	Akihiro Isezaki (JPN)	11.256
2	Zhang Lei (CHN)	

==== Heat 5 ====
Rank	Athlete	Time
1	Gao Zhiguo (CHN)	10.765
2	Ghaffuan Ghazali (MAS)	

==== Heat 6 ====
Rank	Athlete	Time
1	Cho Hyun-ok (KOR)	10.820
2	Wu Hsien-tang (TPE)	

=== Repechages ===
==== Heat 1 ====
Rank	Athlete	Time
1	Wu Hsien-tang (TPE)	13.347
2	Zhang Lei (CHN)	
3	Chester Lam (HKG)	

==== Heat 2 ====
Rank	Athlete	Time
1	Agus Yulianto (INA)	11.882
2	Ghaffuan Ghazali (MAS)	
3	Huang Chih-ying (TPE)	

=== Final (9~12) ===
Rank	Athlete	Time
1	Zhang Lei (CHN)	12.122
2	Huang Chih-ying (TPE)	
3	Ghaffuan Ghazali (MAS)	
4	Chester Lam (HKG)	

=== 1/4 finals ===
==== Heat 1 ====
Rank	Athlete	Race 1	Race 2	Race 3
1	Takashi Kaneko (JPN)	11.559	12.626	
2	Agus Yulianto (INA)			

==== Heat 2 ====
Rank	Athlete	Race 1	Race 2	Race 3
1	Kim Hyung-il (KOR)	11.071		11.584
2	Wu Hsien-tang (TPE)		11.251	

==== Heat 3 ====
Rank	Athlete	Race 1	Race 2	Race 3
1	Josiah Ng (MAS)	11.808	11.203	
2	Cho Hyun-ok (KOR)			

==== Heat 4 ====
Rank	Athlete	Race 1	Race 2	Race 3
1	Akihiro Isezaki (JPN)	11.399	11.226	
2	Gao Zhiguo (CHN)			

=== Final (5~8) ===
Rank	Athlete	Time
1	Wu Hsien-tang (TPE)	11.320
2	Gao Zhiguo (CHN)	
3	Agus Yulianto (INA)	
4	Cho Hyun-ok (KOR)	DNS

=== Semifinals ===
==== Heat 1 ====
Rank	Athlete	Race 1	Race 2	Race 3
1	Takashi Kaneko (JPN)	11.139	11.134	
2	Akihiro Isezaki (JPN)			

==== Heat 2 ====
Rank	Athlete	Race 1	Race 2	Race 3
1	Josiah Ng (MAS)	11.295	11.311	
2	Kim Hyung-il (KOR)			

=== Finals ===
==== Final (3~4) ====
Rank	Athlete	Race 1	Race 2	Race 3
1	Akihiro Isezaki (JPN)		11.228	11.204
2	Kim Hyung-il (KOR)	11.038		

==== Final (1~2) ====
Rank	Athlete	Race 1	Race 2	Race 3
1	Takashi Kaneko (JPN)	11.045	11.069	
2	Josiah Ng (MAS)			

== Final standing ==
Rank	Athlete
1st place, gold medalist(s)	Takashi Kaneko (JPN)
2nd place, silver medalist(s)	Josiah Ng (MAS)
3rd place, bronze medalist(s)	Akihiro Isezaki (JPN)
4	Kim Hyung-il (KOR)
5	Wu Hsien-tang (TPE)
6	Gao Zhiguo (CHN)
7	Agus Yulianto (INA)
8	Cho Hyun-ok (KOR)
9	Zhang Lei (CHN)
10	Huang Chih-ying (TPE)
11	Ghaffuan Ghazali (MAS)
12	Chester Lam (HKG)
13	Bryan Dimacali (PHI)
14	Domino Chau (HKG)
—	Iwan Kartiwan (INA)
