= Yukari Nakagome =

Japanese cyclist

Personal information
- Born: 30 October 1965 (age 60)

Cycling career
- Sport: Cycling

Yukari Nakagome (born 30 October 1965) is a Japanese cyclist. She competed in the women's cross-country mountain biking event at the 2004 Summer Olympics.
