= Cycling at the 2002 Asian Games – Men's downhill =

Sports event

Men's downhill at the 2002 Asian Games
- Venue: Gijang Mountain Bike Race Stadium
- Date: 10 October 2002
- Competitors: 9 from 6 nations

Medalists
gold medal	Jung Hyung-rae	South Korea
silver medal	Takashi Tsukamoto	Japan
bronze medal	Ryo Uchijima	Japan

The men's downhill competition at the 2002 Asian Games in Gijang County was held on 10 October at the Gijang Mountain Bike Race Stadium.

== Schedule ==
All times are Korea Standard Time (UTC+09:00)

Date	Time	Event
Thursday, 10 October 2002	10:22	Qualification
Thursday, 10 October 2002	14:22	Final

== Results ==
=== Qualification ===
Rank	Athlete	Time
1	Ryo Uchijima (JPN)	3:56.85
2	Takashi Tsukamoto (JPN)	3:59.86
3	Jung Hyung-rae (KOR)	4:04.74
4	Sugianto Setyawan (INA)	4:07.78
5	Brian Cook (HKG)	4:08.64
6	Sitichai Gatekaewmanee (THA)	4:12.54
7	Mu Chi-li (TPE)	4:16.73
8	Jung Jong-moon (KOR)	4:18.04
9	Tsui King Man (HKG)	5:05.83

=== Final ===
Rank	Athlete	Time
1st place, gold medalist(s)	Jung Hyung-rae (KOR)	3:54.33
2nd place, silver medalist(s)	Takashi Tsukamoto (JPN)	3:54.80
3rd place, bronze medalist(s)	Ryo Uchijima (JPN)	3:54.89
4	Jung Jong-moon (KOR)	4:00.26
5	Sugianto Setyawan (INA)	4:02.14
6	Sitichai Gatekaewmanee (THA)	4:03.51
7	Brian Cook (HKG)	4:10.02
8	Tsui King Man (HKG)	4:10.87
9	Mu Chi-li (TPE)	4:11.69
