= UCI B World Championships =

The UCI B World Championships were the world championship for Level B bicycle road racing and bicycle time trials organized by the Union Cycliste Internationale (UCI) for nations with developing competitive cycling. The UCI B World Championships included events for both men and women in road cycling and track cycling. The first “B” World Championships were held in late 1997 in Ipoh, Malaysia. The event also served as a means of qualification for the 2008 Olympic Games.

Both the road race and individual time trial events are competed by riders organized by national cycling teams as opposed to commercially sponsored or trade teams, which is the standard in professional cycling.

The B World Championships were discontinued after the 2007 championships, with the Olympic places previously allocated through this event assigned instead through the UCI Continental Championships and the UCI Continental Circuits.

== 2007 Results ==
Event	Gold	Silver	Bronze
Events
UCI B Cycling World Championship; Women's 14.9km Individual time trial	Monrudee Chapookham; Thailand	Gu Sun-Geun; South Korea	Ilzi Bole; South Africa
UCI B Cycling World Championships; Men's 26.8km Individual time trial	Ma Haijun; China	Chris Froome; Kenya	Eugen Wacker; Kyrgyzstan
UCI B Cycling World Championship; Women's 81km Road race	Huang Xiaomei; China	Gao Min; China	Gu Sun-Geun; South Korea
UCI B Cycling World Championship; Men's 161km Road race	Ivan Stević; Serbia	Erik Hoffman; Namibia	Alexandre Pliuschin; Moldova
