= Alireza Haghi =

Iranian cyclist (born 1979)

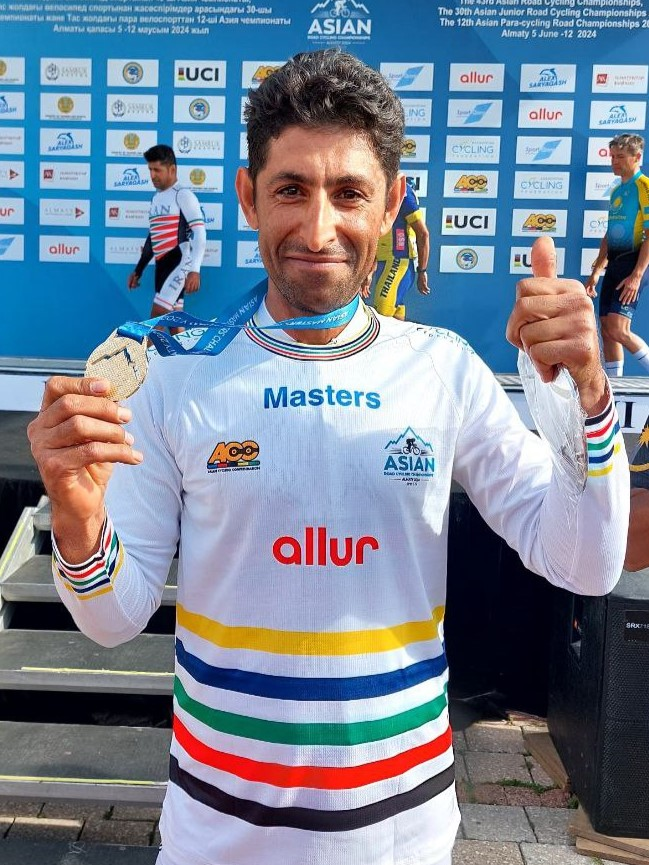
- Haghi with Astana ACC in 2024

Personal information
- Nickname: Gladiator
- Born: 8 February 1979 (age 47) Qods, Iran
- Height: 180 cm (5 ft 11 in)
- Weight: 76 kg (168 lb)

Cycling career
- Sport: Cycling
- Role: Rider
- Rider type: Time-Trailer

Amateur team
- 1997-2004: Peykan

Professional teams
- 2005-2006: Peykan Continental Team
- 2011-2012: Azad University Iran
- 2013: Ayandeh Continental
- 2014: Tabriz Petrochemical Team
- 01.2016-07.2016: Hy Sport-Look Continental
- 07.2016-12.2016: Tabriz Shahrdari Team
Medal record
Men's track cycling
Asian Games
Silver medal – second place	2002 South Korea	Team Pursuit
Bronze medal – third place	2010 China	Team Pursuit
Bronze medal – third place	2010 China	Individual Pursuit
Asian Championships
Gold medal – first place	1999 Japan	Madison
Gold medal – first place	2000 China	Team Pursuit
Gold medal – first place	2003 South Korea	individual pursuit
Gold medal – first place	2012 Malaysia	individual pursuit
UCI B World Championships
Gold medal – first place	2003 Switzerland	individual pursuit
UCI World Cup
Bronze medal – third place	2000 Malaysia	Team Pursuit
Men's road cycling
Asian Championships
Bronze medal – third place	1997 Tehran	ITT
Silver medal – second place	2006 Malaysia	TTT
Bronze medal – third place	2016 Japan	ITT
Gold medal – first place	2024 Kazakhstan	ITT (MasterC)
Gold medal – first place	2024 Kazakhstan	RR (MasterC)
Gold medal – first place	2025 Thailand	ITT (MasterC)
Gold medal – first place	2025 Thailand	RR (MasterC)
Asian Games
Silver medal – second place	2006 Qatar	TTT

Alireza Haghi (born 8 February 1979) is an Iranian Track and Road rider. He competed at the 2012 Summer Olympics in the men's road race, but failed to finish. In the time trial he finished 36th. He also was the national head coach of the Iranian cycling road team in 2022. His specialty was individual pursuit and time trial. Alireza won the gold medal in the Asian cycling championship 2024 in Almaty, Kazakhstan and in 2025 in Thailand

== TRACK ==
1999

Asian TRACK Championships Japan

1st Madison
3rd Team pursuit

2000
World cup Malaysia

3rd Team Pursuit

Asian Championships Shanghai China
1st Team pursuit
2001
Asian Championships Kaohsiung and Taichung, Taiwan

2nd Madison

2002
2002 Asian Games Busan South Korea

2nd Team pursuit

Asian Championships Bangkok, Thailand

2nd Team pursuit

2003
World Championships B Switzerland

1st Individual Pursuit

Asian Championships Changwon, South Korea

1st Individual Pursuit
1st Team Pursuit
3rd Scratch

2004
Asian Championships Yokkaichi, Japan

3rd Individual Pursuit
2nd team Pursuit

2005
Asian Championships Ludhiana, India

2nd team Pursuit

2006
Asian Championships Cheras, Kuala Lumpur, Malaysia

2nd team Pursuit

2007
Asian Championships Bangkok and Nakhon Ratchasima, Thailand

2nd team Pursuit

2009
Asian Championships Tenggarong and Samarinda, Indonesia

2nd team Pursuit

2010
Asian Games Guangzhou 2010

3rd individual pursuit
3rd Team pursuit

2011
Asian Championships Nakhon Ratchasima, Thailand

2nd Individual Pursuit
2nd Madison

2012
Asian Championships Kuala Lumpur, Malaysia

1st Individual Pursuit

2013
Asian Championships Delhi, India

3rd Individual Pursuit
3rd Madison

== ROAD ==
1997
Asian Championships Tehran, Iran

3rd individual TT

2006
2006 Asian Games Doha, Qatar

2nd Team Time Trial

Asian Championships Kuala Lumpur, Malaysia

2nd Team Time Trial

2015
Cism world Games Mungyeong, North Gyeongsang, South Korea

3rd individual TT

2016
Asian Championships Izu, Japan

3rd individual TT

2024
Asian Championships Almaty, Kazakstan (Master)

1st individual TT
1st Road Race

2025
Asian Championships Thailand (Master)

1st individual TT
1st Road Race
