= Cycling at the 2002 Asian Games – Men's individual pursuit =

Men's individual pursuit at the 2002 Asian Games
- Venue: Geumjeong Velodrome
- Date: 4–5 October 2002
- Competitors: 11 from 11 nations

Medalists
gold medal	Vadim Kravchenko	Kazakhstan
silver medal	Suh Seok-kyu	South Korea
bronze medal	Noriyuki Iijima	Japan

The men's 4 km individual pursuit competition at the 2002 Asian Games was held on 4 and 5 October at the Geumjeong Velodrome.

== Schedule ==
All times are Korea Standard Time (UTC+09:00)

Date	Time	Event
Friday, 4 October 2002	11:00	Qualification
Friday, 4 October 2002	15:30	1/4 finals
Saturday, 5 October 2002	16:10	Finals

== Records ==
Prior to this competition, the existing world, Asian and Games records were as follows.

World Record	Chris Boardman (GBR)	4:11.114	Manchester, United Kingdom	29 August 1996
Asian Record	Noriyuki Iijima (JPN)	4:32.195	Manchester, United Kingdom	28 October 2000
Games Record	Vadim Kravchenko (KAZ)	4:35.571	Hiroshima, Japan	11 October 1994

== Results ==
Legend

- DNF — Did not finish
- DNS — Did not start

=== Qualification ===
Rank	Athlete	Time	Notes
1	Vadim Kravchenko (KAZ)	4:36.941	
2	Noriyuki Iijima (JPN)	4:43.650	
3	Hossein Askari (IRI)	4:47.041	
4	Suh Seok-kyu (KOR)	4:47.199	
5	Shi Guijun (CHN)	4:51.046	
6	Liu Chin-feng (TPE)	4:51.888	
7	Damir Iratov (UZB)	4:52.805	
8	Wong Kam Po (HKG)	4:55.031	
9	Bader Al-Yasin (KSA)	5:04.847	
—	Jorge Pereira (TMP)	DNS	
—	Suwandra (INA)	DNS	

=== 1/4 finals ===
==== Heat 1 ====
Rank	Athlete	Time	Notes
1	Suh Seok-kyu (KOR)	4.46.934	
2	Shi Guijun (CHN)	4.51.292	

==== Heat 2 ====
Rank	Athlete	Time	Notes
1	Hossein Askari (IRI)	4.47.053	
—	Liu Chin-feng (TPE)	DNS	

==== Heat 3 ====
Rank	Athlete	Time	Notes
1	Noriyuki Iijima (JPN)	4.47.249	
—	Damir Iratov (UZB)	DNS	

==== Heat 4 ====
Rank	Athlete	Time	Notes
1	Vadim Kravchenko (KAZ)	4.44.813	
—	Wong Kam Po (HKG)	DNS	

==== Summary ====
Rank	Athlete	Time
1	Vadim Kravchenko (KAZ)	4.44.813
2	Suh Seok-kyu (KOR)	4.46.934
3	Hossein Askari (IRI)	4.47.053
4	Noriyuki Iijima (JPN)	4.47.249

=== Finals ===
==== Final (3~4) ====
Rank	Athlete	Time	Notes
3rd place, bronze medalist(s)	Noriyuki Iijima (JPN)	4:44.004	
4	Hossein Askari (IRI)	4:48.264	

==== Final (1~2) ====
Rank	Athlete	Time	Notes
1st place, gold medalist(s)	Vadim Kravchenko (KAZ)	DNF	
2nd place, silver medalist(s)	Suh Seok-kyu (KOR)	Overlapped	
