= Cho Ho-sung =

South Korean cyclist (born 1974)

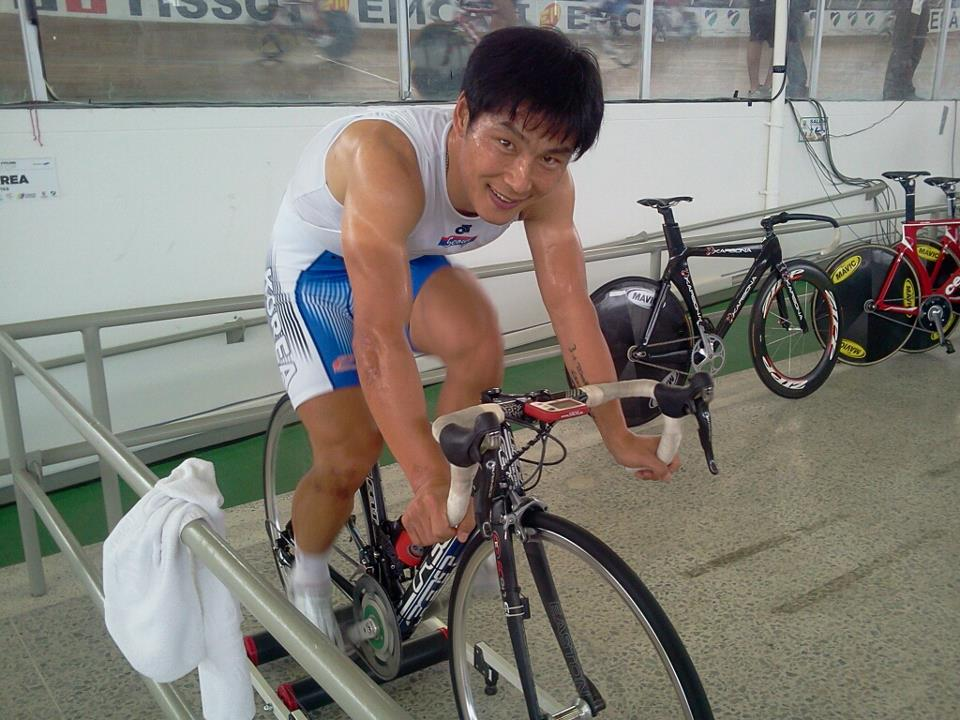
- Cho in 2011

Personal information
- Full name: Cho Ho-sung
- Born: 15 June 1974 (age 52) Gyeonggi Province, South Korea
- Height: 175 cm (5 ft 9 in)
- Weight: 70 kg (154 lb)

Cycling career
- Sport: Cycling
- Current team: Seoul Cycling Team
- Disciplines: Road; Track
- Role: Rider (retired); Directeur sportif; Team manager
- Rider type: Sprinter (road); Endurance (track)

Professional team
- 2009–2014: Seoul Cycling Team

Managerial team
- 2015–: Seoul Cycling Team
Medal record
Men's cycling
Representing South Korea
World Championships
Bronze medal – third place	1999 Berlin	Points race
Asian Games
Gold medal – first place	1998 Bangkok	Team pursuit
Gold medal – first place	2002 Busan	Points race
Gold medal – first place	2002 Busan	Madison
Gold medal – first place	2010 Guangzhou	Team pursuit
Silver medal – second place	1998 Bangkok	Points race
Silver medal – second place	2014 Incheon	Omnium
Asian Championships
Gold medal – first place	1995 Quezon City	Elimination
Gold medal – first place	2001 Kaohsiung-Taichung	Elimination
Gold medal – first place	2001 Kaohsiung-Taichung	Points race
Gold medal – first place	2001 Kaohsiung-Taichung	Team pursuit
Gold medal – first place	2005 Ludhiana	Keirin
Gold medal – first place	2010 Sharjah	Omnium
Gold medal – first place	2010 Sharjah	Points race
Gold medal – first place	2010 Sharjah	Team pursuit
Gold medal – first place	2011 Nakhon Ratchasima	Omnium
Gold medal – first place	2013 New Delhi	Scratch
Gold medal – first place	2013 New Delhi	Points race
Gold medal – first place	2014 Astana	Scratch
Silver medal – second place	2005 Ludhiana	Team sprint
Bronze medal – third place	2014 Astana	Team pursuit

Cho Ho-sung (born 15 June 1974) is a South Korean former cyclist, who currently works as the team manager for UCI Continental team Seoul Cycling Team. At the 2012 Summer Olympics, he competed in the men's omnium.

== Major results ==
=== Road ===
2002
1st Stage 9 Tour of Qinghai Lake
2003
1st Stages 2, 4 & 6 Tour de Korea
2009
1st Tour de Seoul
2011
1st Stages 3, 4 & 6 Tour of Thailand
2013
Tour of Thailand

1st Points classification
1st Stages 3 & 5

1st Stage 7 Tour de Korea
