= Cycling at the 1998 Asian Games – Men's downhill =

Men's downhill at the 1998 Asian Games
- Venue: Khao Yai Rimthan Resort
- Date: 7 December 1998
- Competitors: 10 from 7 nations

Medalists
gold medal	Phannarong Kongsamut	Thailand
silver medal	Takashi Tsukamoto	Japan
bronze medal	Brian Cook	Hong Kong

The men's downhill competition at the 1998 Asian Games in Khao Yai National Park, Nakhon Ratchasima Province was held on 7 December at the Khao Yai Rimthan Resort.

== Schedule ==
All times are Indochina Time (UTC+07:00)

Date	Time	Event
Monday, 7 December 1998	09:30	Final

== Results ==
Legend

- DNS — Did not start

Rank	Athlete	Time
1st place, gold medalist(s)	Phannarong Kongsamut (THA)	3:43.13
2nd place, silver medalist(s)	Takashi Tsukamoto (JPN)	3:44.79
3rd place, bronze medalist(s)	Brian Cook (HKG)	3:57.65
4	Liao Tsung-chieh (TPE)	3:59.61
5	Liao Wu-hsiung (TPE)	4:02.24
6	Jung Hyung-rae (KOR)	4:10.23
7	Nikorn Kuapanya (THA)	4:12.64
8	Joseph Oncada (PHI)	4:28.09
9	Hamdani Hj Besar (BRU)	5:09.30
—	Led Allwyn Saulo (PHI)	DNS
