= Cycling at the 2002 Asian Games – Women's downhill =

Women's downhill at the 2002 Asian Games
- Venue: Gijang Mountain Bike Race Stadium
- Date: 10 October 2002
- Competitors: 7 from 5 nations

Medalists
gold medal	Mio Suemasa	Japan
silver medal	Mami Masuda	Japan
bronze medal	Risa Suseanty	Indonesia

The women's downhill competition at the 2002 Asian Games in Gijang County was held on 10 October at the Gijang Mountain Bike Race Stadium.

== Schedule ==
All times are Korea Standard Time (UTC+09:00)

Date	Time	Event
Thursday, 10 October 2002	10:00	Qualification
Thursday, 10 October 2002	14:00	Final

== Results ==
=== Qualification ===
Rank	Athlete	Time
1	Mio Suemasa (JPN)	4:19.74
2	Mami Masuda (JPN)	4:35.15
3	Risa Suseanty (INA)	4:44.22
4	Phan Thị Thùy Trang (VIE)	4:45.14
5	Liu Hsiang-lan (TPE)	4:49.46
6	Lee Mi-ran (KOR)	5:13.99
7	Chen Ju-miao (TPE)	5:28.88

=== Final ===
Rank	Athlete	Time
1st place, gold medalist(s)	Mio Suemasa (JPN)	4:10.55
2nd place, silver medalist(s)	Mami Masuda (JPN)	4:34.86
3rd place, bronze medalist(s)	Risa Suseanty (INA)	4:36.08
4	Phan Thị Thùy Trang (VIE)	4:37.70
5	Chen Ju-miao (TPE)	4:54.20
6	Liu Hsiang-lan (TPE)	4:59.98
7	Lee Mi-ran (KOR)	5:11.88
