= Cycling at the 2002 Asian Games – Men's individual time trial =

Men's individual time trial at the 2002 Asian Games
- Venue: Busan Road Cycle Race Stadium
- Date: 30 September 2002
- Competitors: 16 from 16 nations

Medalists
gold medal	Andrey Teteryuk	Kazakhstan
silver medal	Eugen Wacker	Kyrgyzstan
bronze medal	Sergey Krushevskiy	Uzbekistan

The men's 48.4 km individual time trial competition at the 2002 Asian Games was held on 30 September at the Road Cycle Race Stadium.

== Schedule ==
All times are Korea Standard Time (UTC+09:00)

Date	Time	Event
Monday, 30 September 2002	13:00	Final

== Results ==
Legend

- DNS — Did not start

Rank	Athlete	Time
1st place, gold medalist(s)	Andrey Teteryuk (KAZ)	1:02:11.05
2nd place, silver medalist(s)	Eugen Wacker (KGZ)	1:02:58.05
3rd place, bronze medalist(s)	Sergey Krushevskiy (UZB)	1:03:41.86
4	Tonton Susanto (INA)	1:05:01.11
5	Ghader Mizbani (IRI)	1:05:38.39
6	Kazuya Okazaki (JPN)	1:05:58.34
7	Victor Espiritu (PHI)	1:06:05.85
8	Jamsrangiin Ölzii-Orshikh (MGL)	1:06:08.13
9	Mai Công Hiếu (VIE)	1:06:13.49
10	Wang Guozhang (CHN)	1:06:17.95
11	Wong Kam Po (HKG)	1:07:08.50
12	Abdulhaq Al-Eissa (KSA)	1:07:43.00
13	Kim Byung-hyuk (KOR)	1:07:52.18
14	Haroon Rashid (PAK)	1:11:19.29
15	Jorge Pereira (TMP)	1:37:40.11
—	Sandeep Kumar Malik (IND)	DNS
