= Li Na (cyclist) =

Chinese track cyclist

Personal information
- Full name: Li Na
- Born: China

Cycling career
- Sport: Cycling
- Discipline: Track
- Role: Rider
- Rider type: Sprint

Major wins
- World keirin champion (2002)
Medal record
Representing China
Women's track cycling
World Championships
Gold medal – first place	2002 Copenhagen	Keirin

Li Na (Chinese: 李娜; pinyin: Lǐ Nà; born December 9, 1982) is a Chinese professional track cyclist.

== Palmarès ==
2002
World Championships, Copenhagen

1st, Keirin

Asian Games, Busan

1st, Sprint

2003
2003 World Cup

2nd, Keirin, Aguascalientes
