= Noh Young-sik =

South Korean cyclist (born 1977)

Personal information
- Born: 2 January 1977 (age 49)

Cycling career
- Sport: Cycling

Noh Young-sik (born 2 January 1977) is a South Korean cyclist. He competed in the men's team pursuit at the 1996 Summer Olympics.
