= Takanobu Jumonji =

Japanese cyclist (born 1975)

Medal record

Men's track cycling

Representing Japan

Olympic Games
Bronze medal – third place	1996 Atlanta	1000m Time Trial

Takanobu Jumonji (十文字 貴信, Jūmonji Takanobu; born 10 November 1975) is a Japanese former track cyclist who competed at the 1996 Summer Olympics in Atlanta, winning a bronze medal in the 1000 metres time trial.

He retired on January 15, 2019.

He now runs a ramen shop in Kashiwa city (Chiba Prefecture).
