= Li Fuyu =

Chinese road bicycle racer

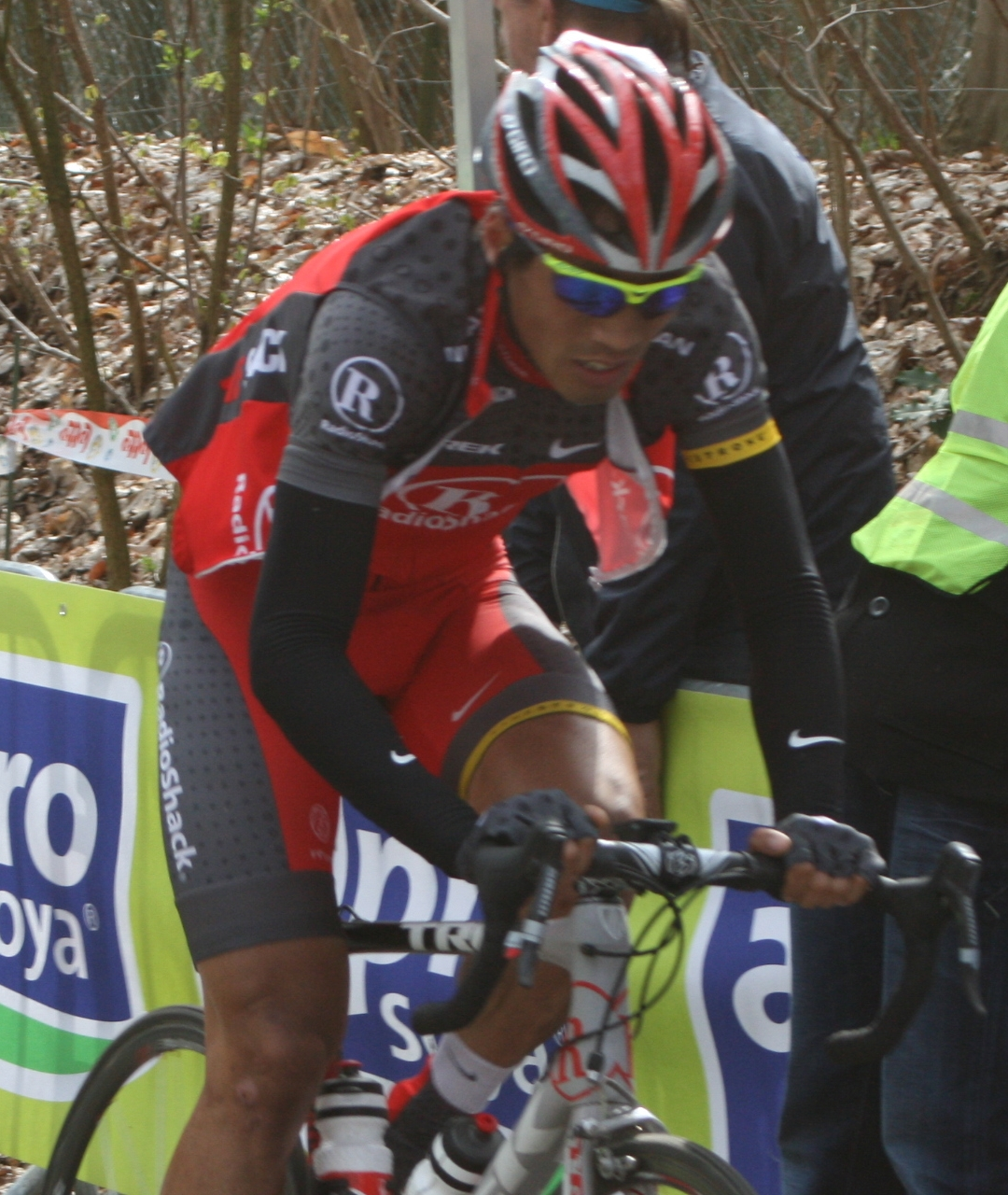

Personal information
- Full name: Li Fuyu
- Born: May 9, 1978 (age 48) Jinan, China
- Height: 1.85 m (6 ft 1 in)
- Weight: 78 kg (172 lb)

Cycling career
- Sport: Cycling
- Current team: FNIX–SCOM–Hengxiang Cycling Team
- Discipline: Road
- Role: Rider (retired); Directeur sportif

Professional teams
- 2005–2006: Marco Polo
- 2007: Discovery Channel
- 2008–2009: Trek–Marco Polo
- 2010: Team RadioShack
- 2012–2013: Hengxiang Cycling Team

Managerial team
- 2014–: Hengxiang Cycling Team

Major wins
- Tour of Thailand (2006); GP Westfalen (2006)

Li Fuyu (Chinese: 李富玉; born May 9, 1978) is a Chinese former professional road bicycle racer, who currently works as a directeur sportif for UCI Continental team FNIX–SCOM–Hengxiang Cycling Team.

== Career ==
Li rode with Marco Polo from 2005 to 2006, before switching to the Pro Tour Discovery Channel under coach Johan Bruyneel for the 2007 season. The Discovery Channel team was disbanded at the end of the highly successful 2007 season, and Li moved on to the newly re-established China-based Trek–Marco Polo for the 2008 season. In 2010, Li rode the newly formed Team RadioShack, reuniting with Bruyneel.

In April 2010, he was dismissed from Team RadioShack after a doping test revealed clenbuterol, a performance-enhancing compound. After completing his ban, he returned to the sport in 2012 as a coach and rider with the Hengxiang Cycling Team, which he had already coached since 2009. Li announced that he would retire from cycling competition at the end of the 2013 season.

== Major results ==
2006
1st Overall Tour of Thailand

1st Stage 3

1st Westfalen Preis
7th Overall Tour of South China Sea
8th Overall Tour of Siam
10th Road race, Asian Games
2008
1st Stage 1 Jelajah Malaysia
4th Road race, Asian Road Championships
2012
1st Greater China riders classification Tour of China II
4th Overall Tour of Fuzhou
