= Santia Tri Kusuma =

Indonesian cyclist (born 1981)

Personal information
- Born: 27 April 1981 (age 45) Malang, Indonesia

Cycling career
- Sport: Cycling
- Disciplines: Track; Road
Medal record
Women's cycling
Representing Indonesia
Asian Games
Silver medal – second place	2010 Guangzhou	Road race
Bronze medal – third place	2002 Busan	Points race
Asian Championships
Gold medal – first place	2002 Bangkok	Elimination race
Southeast Asian Games
Gold medal – first place	2005 Manila	Time trial
Gold medal – first place	2007 Nakhon Ratchasima	Team sprint
Gold medal – first place	2007 Nakhon Ratchasima	Points race
Bronze medal – third place	2011 Jakarta–Palembang	Sprint
Bronze medal – third place	2011 Jakarta–Palembang	Team sprint

Santia Tri Kusuma (born 27 April 1981) is an Indonesian cyclist. She competed in the women's points race at the 2004 Summer Olympics.
