= Wang Qingzhi =

Chinese cyclist (born 1968)

Personal information
- Born: 29 September 1968 (age 58)

Cycling career
- Sport: Cycling

Wang Qingzhi (born 29 September 1968) is a Chinese cyclist. She competed in the women's pursuit at the 1996 Summer Olympics.
