= Ji Sung-hwan =

South Korean cyclist (born 1971)

Personal information
- Born: 10 November 1971 (age 54)

Cycling career
- Sport: Cycling
Medal record
Men's cycling
Representing South Korea
Asian Games
Gold medal – first place	1994 Hiroshima	Team pursuit
Gold medal – first place	1998 Bangkok	Team pursuit
Gold medal – first place	1998 Bangkok	Time Trial

Ji Sung-hwan (Korean: 지성환, born 10 November 1971) is a South Korean former cyclist. He competed in the team pursuit at the 1992 Summer Olympics.
