= Kim Chi-bum =

South Korean cyclist (born 1981)

Personal information
- Born: 21 February 1981 (age 45)

Cycling career
- Sport: Cycling

Kim Chi-bum (born 21 February 1981) is a South Korean cyclist. He competed in the men's sprint at the 2004 Summer Olympics.
