= Hong Suk-hwan =

South Korean cyclist (born 1975)

Personal information
- Born: 18 December 1975 (age 50)

Cycling career
- Sport: Cycling

Hong Suk-hwan (born 18 December 1975) is a South Korean cyclist. He competed at the 1996 Summer Olympics and the 2004 Summer Olympics.
