= Sergey Lavrenenko =

Kazakhstani cyclist (born 1972)

Personal information
- Born: 15 May 1972 (age 54) Saran, Kazakh SSR, Soviet Union

Cycling career
- Sport: Cycling
- Current team: Retired
- Disciplines: Road, track
- Role: Rider

Professional team
- 2003: Giant Asia Racing Team
Medal record
Representing Kazakhstan
Men's track cycling
World Championships
Bronze medal – third place	1995 Bogotá	Points race

Sergey Lavrenenko (Сергей Валерьевич Лаврененко, born 15 May 1972) is a Kazakhstani former cyclist. A bronze medalist in the world points race championship in 1995, he also represented Kazakhstan in this competition at the 1996 and 2000 Summer Olympics. Also active on the road, he won the Tour of Turkey in 2000.

== Major results ==
=== Road ===
1995
1st Stage 4 Toer Report
3rd Overall Tour of Turkey
1997
7th Overall Tour de Langkawi
1998
3rd Overall Tour d'Egypte
2000
1st Overall Tour of Turkey

1st Stage 1

1st Stage 3 Tour d'Egypte
1st Stage 3 Tour de Serbie
2nd Overall Tour of Romania
2001
1st Stage 2 Tour d'Egypte
3rd Overall Tour of Turkey

1st Prologue

2003
2nd National Time Trial Championships
2004
1st Stage 6 Tour of Turkey
2005
2nd Overall Tour d'Egypte

1st Prologue

2006
1st Stage 5 Kerman Tour
4th Overall Tour du Cameroun

1st Stage 7

=== Track ===
1995
3rd Points race, World Track Championships
1998
1st Points race, Asian Games
2nd Team pursuit, Asian Games
