= Hyun Byung-chul =

South Korean cyclist (born 1974)

Personal information
- Born: 15 April 1974 (age 52)

Cycling career
- Sport: Cycling

Hyun Byung-chul (born 15 April 1974) is a South Korean cyclist. He competed in the men's sprint at the 1996 Summer Olympics.
