= Fang Fen-fang =

Taiwanese cyclist (born 1981)

Personal information
- Born: 15 June 1981 (age 45)

Cycling career
- Sport: Cycling

Fang Fen-fang (born 15 June 1981) is a Taiwanese cyclist. She competed in the women's points race at the 2000 Summer Olympics.
