= Eugen Wacker =

Kyrgyzstani cyclist

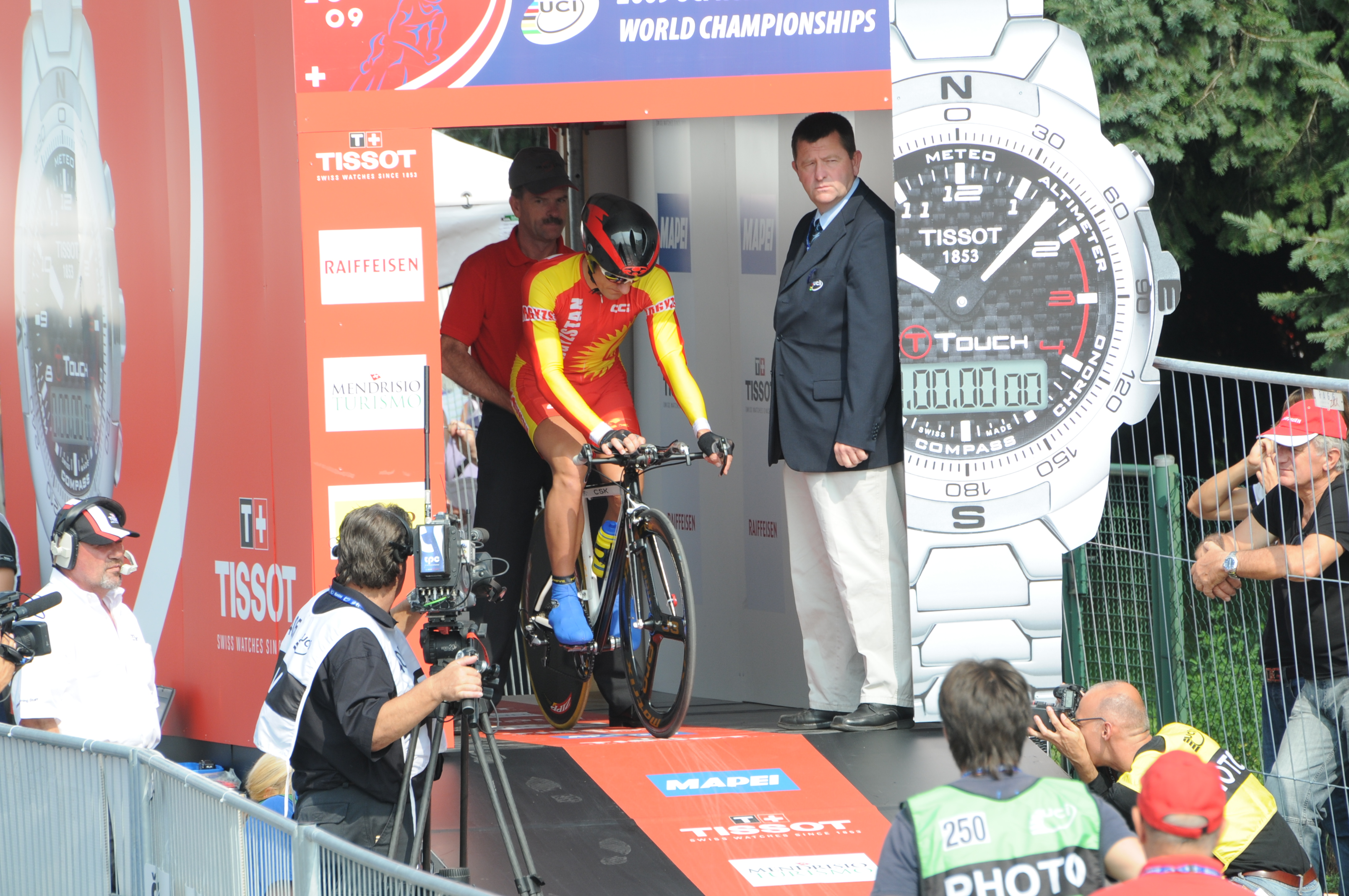
- Wacker at the 2009 UCI Road World Championships

Personal information
- Full name: Eugen Wacker
- Born: 18 April 1974 (age 52) Kirn, West Germany
- Height: 1.76 m (5 ft 9 in)
- Weight: 65 kg (143 lb)

Cycling career
- Sport: Cycling
- Discipline: Road
- Role: Rider
- Rider type: Time-trialist

Professional teams
- 1999: Leonardo Coast
- 2000–2002: Mróz–Supradyn Witaminy
- 2003: Vermarc Sportswear
- 2004: Action
- 2005: Capec
- 2009: Azad University Iran
- 2010: Giant Asia Racing Team
- 2011: LeTua Cycling Team
- 2012: Uzbekistan Suren Team
- 2013: Qinghai Tianyoude Cycling Team
- 2014: Start–Trigon Cycling Team
- 2015: Kuwait Cycling Project
- 2017: Massi–Kuwait Cycling Project

Major wins
- Stage races Herald Sun Tour (2000) One-day races and Classics National Road Race Championships (2002–2004, 2007–2013, 2015) National Time Trial Championships (2002–2004, 2007–2013, 2015)

Eugen Wacker (Russian: Евгений Ваккер, sometimes written as Evgeny Vakker; born 18 April 1974) is a German-born Kyrgyzstani cyclist, who last rode for UCI Continental team Massi–Kuwait Cycling Project. At the 2004 Summer Olympics, he competed in the road race and time trial. In April 2017, he was suspended until February 2018 for testing positive for meldonium.

== Major results ==
2000
1st Overall Herald Sun Tour
2001
1st Overall Szlakiem Grodów Piastowskich
1st Stage 12 (TTT) Herald Sun Tour
3rd Melbourne to Warrnambool Classic
7th Overall Tour de Beauce

1st Stage 1 (TTT)

2002
National Road Championships

1st Road race
1st Time trial

2nd Time trial, Asian Games
6th Overall Sachsen Tour
2003
1st Time trial, UCI B World Championships
National Road Championships

1st Road race
1st Time trial

3rd Duo Normand (with Artem Botchkarev)
2004
National Road Championships

1st Road race
1st Time trial

2005
9th Overall Tour of China
2006
2nd Time trial, Asian Games
2007
Asian Road Championships

1st Time trial
10th Road race

National Road Championships

1st Road race
1st Time trial

3rd Time trial, UCI B World Championships
3rd Overall Kerman Tour
5th Chrono Champenois
9th Overall Presidential Cycling Tour of Turkey

1st Stage 4

2008
1st Time trial, Asian Road Championships
National Road Championships

1st Road race
1st Time trial

4th Memorial Davide Fardelli
7th Chrono des Nations
10th Chrono Champenois
2009
National Road Championships

1st Road race
1st Time trial

1st Stage 4 President Tour of Iran
3rd Time trial, Asian Road Championships
6th Overall Tour de Singkarak
7th Chrono des Nations
8th Memorial Davide Fardelli
2010
National Road Championships

1st Road race
1st Time trial

2nd Time trial, Asian Games
2nd Memorial Davide Fardelli
3rd Time trial, Asian Road Championships
4th Overall Tour de East Java
2011
1st Time trial, Asian Road Championships
National Road Championships

1st Road race
1st Time trial

2012
1st Time trial, Asian Road Championships
National Road Championships

1st Road race
1st Time trial

5th Memorial Davide Fardelli
2013
National Road Championships

1st Road race
1st Time trial

3rd Time trial, Asian Road Championships
2014
2nd Time trial, Asian Games
2nd Time trial, Asian Road Championships
2015
National Road Championships

1st Road race
1st Time trial

2nd Overall Tour of Al Zubarah

1st Stage 3

Asian Road Championships

4th Time trial
9th Road race

10th Overall Sharjah International Cycling Tour
2016
5th Time trial, Asian Road Championships
2017
4th Time trial, Asian Road Championships
