= Miho Oki =

Japanese cyclist (born 1974)

Miho Oki 沖美穂
Personal information
- Born: 8 March 1974 (age 52) Shimizu, Hokkaido, Japan
- Height: 155 cm (5 ft 1 in)

Cycling career
- Sport: Cycling
- Current team: retired
- Discipline: Road
- Role: Rider

Professional teams
- 2002: CA Mantes-la-Ville 78
- 2003–2004: Farm Frites - Hartol
- 2005: USC Chirio Forno d'Asolo
- 2006: Nobili Rubinetterie Menikini Cogeas
- 2007–2008: Menikini - Selle Italia

Major wins
- Japanese National Road Race Championships, Women, 1998–2008

Miho Oki (沖美穂, Miho Oki; born 8 March 1974, in Shimizu, Hokkaido, Japan) is a Japanese former women's racing cyclist. Born in the northern island of Hokkaido, she originally trained to be a speed skater, but switched to cycling when she was 22. She won the first Japanese National Road Race Championships for women held in 1998, a title she ended up winning eleven straight times. From 2002, she became the first Japanese to participate on the women's pro tour in Europe, riding for French, Italian, and Dutch teams. She won the Trophée des Grimpeurs in 2002. She represented Japan at the 2000, 2004, and 2008 Summer Olympics. She retired in 2008 and currently serves as an adviser for women's keirin.

== Major results ==
2008
7th Omloop Het Volk
