= Vadim Kravchenko =

Kazakhstani cyclist (born 1969)

Personal information
- Full name: Vadim Vladimirovich Kravchenko
- Born: 4 May 1969 (age 57) Alma-Ata, Kazakh SSR, Soviet Union

Cycling career
- Sport: Cycling
- Current team: Retired
- Disciplines: Road, track
- Role: Rider

Amateur teams
- 2002: Brisaspor
- 2006: Capec

Professional team
- 1992: Postobón–Manzana–Ryalcao

Vadim Vladimirovich Kravchenko (Russian: Вадим Владимирович Кравченко; born 4 May 1969, in Almaty) is a Kazakhstani former cyclist. He competed in the 1996 and 2000 Summer Olympics in the individual pursuit.

== Major results ==
=== Road ===
1990
2nd Overall Tour of Turkey
1993
1st Stage 2A Niedersachsen-Rundfahrt
1995
2nd Overall Tour of Turkey
1998
1st Overall Tour d'Egypte
2000
1st Overall Tour of Romania
2nd Overall Tour of Turkey

1st Stage 2

2001
1st National Time Trial Championships
1st Stage 6 Tour of Turkey
3rd Overall Tour d'Egypte

1st Stage 1

2002
3rd Overall Tour d'Egypte

1st Stage 2

2003
1st Stage 5 Tour de Serbie

=== Track ===
1987
1st Team pursuit, Junior World Track Championships, (with Valeri Butaro, Mikhail Orlov and Dimitri Zhdanov)
1991
2nd Amateur team pursuit, World Track Championships
1995
1st Individual pursuit, Asian Track Championships
1998
Asian Games

1st Individual pursuit
2nd Team pursuit

1999
1st Individual pursuit, Asian Track Championships
2001
1st Individual pursuit, Asian Track Championships
2002
Asian Games

1st Individual pursuit
3rd Team pursuit

2003
2nd Individual pursuit, B World Track Championships
