= Ma Yanping =

Chinese cyclist (born 1977)

Personal information
- Born: 5 February 1977 (age 49)

Cycling career
- Sport: Cycling

Ma Yanping (born 5 February 1977) is a Chinese cyclist. She competed at the 2000 Summer Olympics and the 2004 Summer Olympics.
