= Yuichiro Kamiyama =

Japanese cyclist (born 1968)

Personal information
- Born: 7 April 1968 (age 58) Oyama, Japan

Cycling career
- Sport: Cycling
- Discipline: Track
- Rider type: Sprinter
Medal record
Men's track cycling
Representing Japan
World Championships
Silver medal – second place	1989 Lyon	Sprint

Yuichiro Kamiyama (born 7 April 1968) is a Japanese former track cyclist. He competed at the 1996 Summer Olympics and the 2000 Summer Olympics.
