= Zhao Haijuan =

Chinese cyclist (born 1971)

Personal information
- Full name: Zhao Haijuan
- Born: 11 May 1971 (age 55) Jilin, China
- Height: 165 cm (5 ft 5 in)
- Weight: 60 kg (132 lb)

Cycling career
- Sport: Cycling
- Disciplines: Road cycling, Track cycling
- Role: Rider

Zhao Haijuan (original name: 趙 海娟; born 11 May 1971) is a track and road cyclist from China. She represented her nation at the 1996 Summer Olympics in the women's road race.
