= Kim Yong-mi (cyclist) =

South Korean cyclist

Personal information
- Born: 23 February 1976 (age 50) South Korea

Cycling career
- Sport: Cycling
- Discipline: Road cycling
- Role: Rider

- Kim Yong-mi
- Hangul: 김용미
- Hanja: 金容美
- RR: Gim Yongmi
- MR: Kim Yongmi

Kim Yong-mi (Korean: 김용미; born 23 February 1976) is a track and road cyclist from South Korea. She represented her nation at the 1996 Summer Olympics on the road in the women's road race and on the track in the women's points race. At the 2004 Summer Olympics she competed also in the women's points race and got in 16th place She was the sole Korean Asian Games gold medalist in women's road cycling (2002 Busan Asian Games) until Na Ah-reum repeated the feat in the 2018 Jakarta Asian Games. She is currently the coach of the South Korean Samyang Corp women's cycling team as well being the occasional South Korean national women's team coach.
