= Alexandra Yeung =

Hong Kong cyclist (born 1972)

Alexandra Yeung Ka Wah
Personal information
- Native name
- Traditional Chinese: 楊嘉華
- Simplified Chinese: 杨嘉华
Transcriptions
Standard Mandarin
- Hanyu Pinyin: Yáng Jiāhuá
- Wade–Giles: Yang Chia‑hua
Yue: Cantonese
- Jyutping: Joeng4 Gaa1 Waa4
- Nationality: Canadian-Chinese
- Born: 15 September 1972 (age 53)

Sport
- Sport: Cycling

Alexandra Yeung Ka Wah (traditional Chinese: 楊嘉華; simplified Chinese: 杨嘉华; born 15 September 1972) is a Hong Kong cyclist. She competed in the women's cross-country mountain biking event at the 2000 Summer Olympics. Shen Jin-kang began coaching her in 1997. Yeung represented Hong Kong in multiple international cycling competitions, including at the 1997 World Cycling Championships B, the 1998 and the 2002 Asian Games, and the 1999 and 2001 Asian Cycling Championships.

== Biography ==
Yeung is Canadian-Chinese. She competed in the 5th Hong Kong Junior Triathlon Championship (香港三項小鐵人錦標賽) held in 1991. With a time of 49 minutes and 46 seconds in the cycling contest, Yeung placed first in the girls' under-18 group. She began being coached by Shen Jin-kang in August 1997. That year, she participated in the 1997 National Games of China. Yeung competed in December 1997 at the World Cycling Championships B held at the Velodrome Rakyat in Malaysia. After receiving a bronze medal in the 16 km (9.9 mi) points race, she placed fourth in the 3 km (1.9 mi) individual pursuit and sixth in the road race. Yeung competed in the 1998 Asian Games.

At the 1999 Asian Cycling Championships, Yeung received the ninth and final place in the women's 68.5 km (42.6 mi) individual road bicycle racing. She placed 27th in the women's cross-country mountain biking event at the 2000 Summer Olympics with a time of two hours, 11 minutes, and 29.79 seconds. She was added to the Olympic roster late in the process, having been told she qualified for the team a little over a month before the competition. The 2000 Summer Olympics opening ceremony took place on the same day as Yeung's birthday so Yeung's coach, Shen Jin-kang, designated a physiotherapist to purchase gifts on behalf of the team for her. Kenneth Howe of the South China Morning Post called Yeung's showing there as among the finest by a Hong Kong athlete.

At the 2001 Asian Cycling Championships, Yeung placed seventh in the women's 74 km (46 mi) individual road race out of 22 total participants. In May 2002, Yeung trained in Trexlertown, Pennsylvania, with Lauren Franges. In July that year, she broke her right collarbone while training in the United States so missed an Asian Championships event. Before returning to Hong Kong, she spent time training with a professional American cycling team until the middle of September. Later that year at the 2002 Asian Games, Yeung competed in the 24.2 km (15.0 mi) time trial final and placed fifth with a time of 37 minutes and 21.16 seconds. She traveled to Busan with her 210 kg (460 lb) of gear, among them a motorcycle and a bicycle. Hong Kong football team members, who flew on the same plane with her, helped her with her luggage. In November 2002, Yeung competed in the Himalaya Mountain Climbing Cycling Race (喜瑪拉雅山爬山單車賽), which took place over three days in the Himalayas in Kathmandu, Nepal. In the women's division, she placed second overall, having finished second twice and first once. On the final day, she raced using one hand for the final 20 kilometres (12 mi) on a steep downhill segment, matching her typical speed despite having sprained her left hand when hitting a mud-filled pothole. The race featured 150 cyclists from Europe and Asia.
