= Asian Cycling Championships =

Continental cycling championships held in Asia

The Asian Cycling Championships is an annual continental cycling championships for road bicycle racing and track cycling since 1963, exclusively for Asian cyclists selected by the national governing body (member nations of the Asian Cycling Confederation).

Since 2017, competitions on road and track cycling are held separately.

The winner wear, for one year, the Asian Champion Jersey.

Asian Championship Jersey

== Competitions ==
=== 1963–2016 ===
Edition	Year	Country	City	Velodrome
I	1963	Malaya	Kuala Lumpur	Merdeka Stadium
II	1965	Philippines	Manila	
III	1967	Thailand	Bangkok	
IV	1969	South Korea	Seoul	
V	1971	Singapore	Singapore	Farrer Park Stadium
VI	1973	Japan	Izu	
VII	~~1975~~^{1}	~~Indonesia~~	~~Jakarta~~	
VIII	1977	Philippines	Manila	
IX	1979	Malaysia	Kuala Lumpur	
X	1981	Thailand	Bangkok	
XI	1983	Philippines	Manila	
XII	1985	South Korea	Incheon	
XIII	1987	Indonesia	Jakarta	
XIV	1989	India	New Delhi	Yamuna Velodrome
XV	1991	China	Beijing	
XVI	1993	Malaysia	Ipoh	
XVII	1995	Philippines	Quezon City	Amoranto Velodrome
XVIII	1997	Iran^{2} South Korea^{3}	Tehran; Seoul	
XIX	1999	Japan	Maebashi	Green Dome Maebashi
XX	2000	China	Shanghai	

Edition	Year	Country	City	Velodrome
XXI	2001	Taiwan	Kaohsiung; Taichung	
XXII	2002	Thailand	Bangkok	
XXIII	2003	South Korea	Changwon	Changwon Velodrome
XXIV	2004	Japan	Yokkaichi	Yokkaichi Keirin Velodrome
XXV	2005	India	Ludhiana	Punjab Agricultural University's Velodrome
XXVI	2006	Malaysia	Kuala Lumpur	Kuala Lumpur City Hall Velodrome
XXVII	2007	Thailand	Bangkok	Huamark Velodrome
XXVIII	2008	Japan	Nara	Nara Keirin Velodrome
XXIX	2009	Indonesia	Tenggarong	Tenggarong Velodrome
XXX	2010	United Arab Emirates	Sharjah	Zayed Velodrome
XXXI	2011	Thailand	Nakhon Ratchasima	King's 80th Birthday Anniversary Velodrome
XXXII	2012	Malaysia	Kuala Lumpur	Cheras Velodrome
XXXIII	2013	India	New Delhi	Yamuna Velodrome
XXXIV	2014	Kazakhstan	Astana	Saryarka Velodrome
XXXV	2015	Thailand	Nakhon Ratchasima	King's 80th Birthday Anniversary Velodrome
XXXVI	2016	Japan	Izu	Izu Velodrome

=== 2017–present ===
Edition	Year	Road Cycling		Track Cycling		
Edition	Year	Country	City	Country	City	Velodrome
XXXVII	2017 (Road); 2017 (Track)	Bahrain	Manama	India	New Delhi	Indira Gandhi Arena
XXXVIII	2018 (Road); 2018 (Track)	Myanmar	Naypyidaw	Malaysia	Nilai	Velodrom Nasional Malaysia
XXXIX	2019 (Road); 2019 (Track)	Uzbekistan	Tashkent	Indonesia	Jakarta	Jakarta International Velodrome
XL	2020 (Track)^{4}	Cancelled		South Korea	Jincheon	Jincheon National Training Center Velodrome
XLI	2022 (Road); 2022 (Track)	Tajikistan	Dushanbe	India	New Delhi	Indira Gandhi Stadium Velodrome
XLII	2023 (Road); 2023 (Track)	Thailand	Rayong	Malaysia	Nilai	Velodrom Nasional Malaysia
XLIII	2024 (Road); 2024 (Track)	Kazakhstan	Almaty	India	New Delhi	Indira Gandhi Stadium Velodrome
XLIV	2025 (Road); 2025 (Track)	Thailand	Phitsanulok	Malaysia	Nilai	Velodrom Nasional Malaysia
XLV	2026 (Road); 2026 (Track)	Saudi Arabia	Al-Qassim	Philippines	Tagaytay	Tagaytay City Velodrome

== Men's road events ==
=== Individual road race ===
Year	(gold) Gold Medal	(silver) Silver Medal	(bronze) Bronze Medal
1963	(Thailand) Taworn Jirapan	(Japan) Masashi Omiya	(Thailand) Wanchai Weelasineekul
1999	(Kazakhstan) Serguei Yakovlev	(Japan) Hidenori Nodera	
2001	(Hong Kong) Wong Kam-po	(Philippines) Arnel Quirimit	(Japan) Junichi Shibuya
2002	(China) Wang Guozhang	(Iran) Ahad Kazemi	(Hong Kong) Wong Kam-po
2003	(Japan) Shinri Suzuki	(Japan) Hidenori Nodera	(Iran) Hassan Maleki
2004	(Japan) Shinri Suzuki	(Kazakhstan) Maxim Iglinsky	(Kazakhstan) Valeriy Dmitriyev
2005	(South Korea) Joo Hyun-wook	(Syria) Omar Hasanin	(Kazakhstan) Dmitriy Gruzdev
2006	(Iran) Mehdi Sohrabi	(Japan) Shinichi Fukushima	(Syria) Omar Hasanin
2007	(Japan) Takashi Miyazawa	(Iran) Hossein Askari	(Hong Kong) Chan Chun Hing
2008	(Japan) Fumiyuki Beppu	(Uzbekistan) Temur Mukamedov	(Japan) Takashi Miyazawa
2009	(Kazakhstan) Dmitry Fofonov	(Kazakhstan) Alexander Vinokourov	(Kazakhstan) Valentin Iglinsky
2010	(Iran) Mehdi Sohrabi	(Japan) Takashi Miyazawa	(Iran) Hossein Nateghi
2011	(Japan) Yukiya Arashiro	(Uzbekistan) Muradjan Khalmuratov	(Iran) Hossein Askari
2012	(Hong Kong) Wong Kam-po	(Iran) Mehdi Sohrabi	(Japan) Taiji Nishitani
2013	(Uzbekistan) Muradjan Khalmuratov	(Iran) Arvin Moazzemi	(Kazakhstan) Andrey Mizurov
2014	(Kazakhstan) Ruslan Tleubayev	(Kazakhstan) Maxim Iglinsky	(Kazakhstan) Dmitriy Gruzdev
2015	(Iran) Hossein Askari	(United Arab Emirates) Yousif Mirza Al Hammadi	(Japan) Kohei Uchima
2016	(Hong Kong) Cheung King Lok	(Japan) Yukiya Arashiro	(Japan) Fumiyuki Beppu
2017	(South Korea) Park Sang-hong	(United Arab Emirates) Yousif Mirza	(Kazakhstan) Zhandos Bizhigitov
2018	(United Arab Emirates) Yousif Mirza	(Japan) Fumiyuki Beppu	(Iran) Mehdi Sohrabi
2019	(Kazakhstan) Yevgeniy Gidich	(China) Lü Xianjing	(Chinese Taipei) Feng Chun-kai
2022	(Kazakhstan) Igor Chzhan	(Japan) Nariyuki Masuda	(Mongolia) Sainbayaryn Jambaljamts
2023	(Kazakhstan) Gleb Brussenskiy	(Kazakhstan) Yevgeniy Gidich	(Japan) Yukiya Arashiro
2024	(South Korea) Kim Eu-ro	(China) Lü Xianjing	(Kazakhstan) Yevgeniy Fedorov
2025	(China) Lü Xianjing	(Thailand) Peerapol Chawchiangkwang	(Mongolia) Sainbayaryn Jambaljamts
2026	(Kazakhstan) Yevgeniy Fedorov	(China) Su Haoyu	(United Arab Emirates) Abdulla Jasim Al-Ali

=== Individual time trial ===
Year	(gold) Gold Medal	(silver) Silver Medal	(bronze) Bronze Medal
1963	(Thailand) Taworn Jirapan	(Japan) Masashi Omiya	(Malaysia) Ng Joo Pong
1995	(Kazakhstan) Andrey Mizurov	(South Korea) Kim Tae-ho	(Kyrgyzstan) Aleksandr Dyadichkin
1999	(Kazakhstan) Andrey Mizurov	(Kazakhstan) Serguei Yakovlev	(Japan) Osamu Sumida
2001	(Iran) Hossein Askari	(Mongolia) Jamsran Ulzii-Orshikh	(Hong Kong) Wong Kam-po
2002	(Japan) Kazuya Okazaki	(Indonesia) Tonton Susanto	(China) Shi Guijun
2003	(Iran) Hossein Askari	(Vietnam) Mai Cong Hieu	(Japan) Kazuya Okazaki
2004	(Kazakhstan) Assan Bazayev	(Iran) Hossein Askari	(Iran) Ghader Mizbani
2005	(South Korea) Youm Jung-hwan	(Iran) Hossein Askari	(Uzbekistan) Vladimir Tuychiev
2006	(Kazakhstan) Andrey Mizurov	(Iran) Ghader Mizbani	(Japan) Makoto Iijima
2007	(Kyrgyzstan) Eugen Wacker	(Iran) Hossein Askari	(Uzbekistan) Vladimir Tuychiev
2008	(Kyrgyzstan) Eugen Wacker	(Kazakhstan) Alexey Kolessov	(Japan) Yukiya Arashiro
2009	(Kazakhstan) Alexander Vinokourov	(Kazakhstan) Andrey Mizurov	(Kyrgyzstan) Eugen Wacker
2010	(Kazakhstan) Andrey Mizurov	(Iran) Hossein Askari	(Kyrgyzstan) Eugen Wacker
2011	(Kyrgyzstan) Eugen Wacker	(Kazakhstan) Dmitriy Gruzdev	(Iran) Hossein Askari
2012	(Kyrgyzstan) Eugen Wacker	(Kazakhstan) Dmitriy Gruzdev	(Iran) Hossein Askari
2013	(Uzbekistan) Muradjan Khalmuratov	(Kazakhstan) Andrey Mizurov	(Kyrgyzstan) Eugen Wacker
2014	(Kazakhstan) Dmitriy Gruzdev	(Kyrgyzstan) Eugen Wacker	(South Korea) Choe Hyeong-min
2015	(Iran) Hossein Askari	(Kazakhstan) Zhandos Bizhigitov	(South Korea) Choe Hyeong-min
2016	(Hong Kong) Cheung King Lok	(South Korea) Choe Hyeong-min	(Iran) Alireza Haghi
2017	(Kazakhstan) Dmitriy Gruzdev	(South Korea) Choe Hyeong-min	(Hong Kong) Cheung King Lok
2018	(Hong Kong) Cheung King Lok	(South Korea) Choe Hyeong-min	(Iran) Arvin Moazzami
2019	(Kazakhstan) Daniil Fominykh	(Chinese Taipei) Feng Chun-kai	(Hong Kong) Cheung King Lok
2022	(Kazakhstan) Yevgeniy Fedorov	(Japan) Nariyuki Masuda	(Uzbekistan) Muradjan Khalmuratov
2023	(Kazakhstan) Yevgeniy Fedorov	(Chinese Taipei) Sergio Tu	(Mongolia) Jambaljamts Sainbayar
2024	(Kazakhstan) Yevgeniy Fedorov	(Kazakhstan) Dmitriy Gruzdev	(Japan) Yukiya Arashiro
2025	(Kazakhstan) Yevgeniy Fedorov	(Kazakhstan) Dmitriy Gruzdev	(Chinese Taipei) Chun Kai Feng

=== Team time trial ===
Year	(gold) Gold Medal	(silver) Silver Medal	(bronze) Bronze Medal
2017	Kazakhstan; Alexey Lutsenko; Dmitriy Gruzdev; Andrey Zeits; Daniil Fominykh; Zhandos Bizhigitov; Bakhtiyar Kozhatayev	Japan; Takeaki Amezawa; Yukiya Arashiro; Nariyuki Masuda; Rei Onodera; Ryota Nishizono; Hayato Okamoto	Hong Kong; Leung Chun Wing; Ko Siu Wai; Cheung King Lok; Ho Burr; Leung Ka Yu; Mow Ching Yin
2018	Japan; Yukiya Arashiro; Fumiyuki Beppu; Rei Onodera; Masaki Yamamoto; Shoi Matsuda; Yusuke Hatanaka	Iran; Arvin Moazzami; Samad Pourseyedi; Behnam Arian; Mehdi Sohrabi; Mohammad Rajabloo; Mohammad Esmaeil Chaichi	Hong Kong; Cheung King Lok; Fung Ka Hoo; Ko Siu Wai; Ho Burr; Mow Ching Yin; Leung Chun Wing
2019	Kazakhstan; Artyom Zakharov; Dmitriy Gruzdev; Zhandos Bizhigitov; Yuriy Natarov; Daniil Fominykh; Yevgeniy Gidich	South Korea; Joo Dae-yeong; Kim Kook-hyun; Min Kyeong-ho; Choe Hyeong-min; Park Sang-hoon; Park Sang-hong	Hong Kong; Mow Ching Yin; Leung Chun Wing; Leung Ka Yu; Ko Siu Wai
2022	Kazakhstan; Yuriy Natarov; Igor Chzhan; Yevgeniy Gidich; Yevgeniy Fedorov	Mongolia; Batsaikhany Tegshbayar; Erdenebatyn Bilgüünjargal; Sainbayaryn Jambaljamts; Batmönkhiin Maral-Erdene	Iran; Samad Pourseyedi; Behnam Arian; Mohammad Esmaeil Chaichi; Mohammad Ganjkhanloo

== Women's road events ==
=== Individual road race ===
Year	(gold) Gold Medal	(silver) Silver Medal	(bronze) Bronze Medal
1999	(Japan) Miho Oki	(China) Yang Limei	(Japan) Akemi Morimoto
2001	(South Korea) Kim Yong-mi	(Vietnam) Hoang Thi Thanh Tan	(Japan) Miho Oki
2002	(China) Yang Limei	(Japan) Tamamo Nakamura	(China) Jiang Yanxia
2003	(China) Jiang Yanxia	(China) Zhang Junying	(South Korea) Choi Hye-Kyeong
2004	(China) Zhang Junying	(Thailand) Chanpeng Nontasin	(Japan) Akemi Morimoto
2005	(South Korea) You Jin-a	(China) Ni Fenghan	(Pakistan) Sidra Sadaf
2006	(South Korea) Han Song-hee	(China) Liu Yongli	(South Korea) Lee Min-hye
2007	(China) Meng Lang	(Malaysia) Noor Azian Alias	(South Korea) Gu Sung-eun
2008	(China) Gao Min	(Japan) Miho Oki	(South Korea) Choi Hye-Kyeong
2009	(China) Tang Kerong	(Chinese Taipei) Hsiao Mei-yu	(Kazakhstan) Natalya Stefanskaya
2010	(South Korea) You Jin-a	(Kazakhstan) Natalya Stefanskaya	(Thailand) Jutatip Maneephan
2011	(Chinese Taipei) Hsiao Mei-yu	(South Korea) Gu Sung-eun	(Thailand) Jutatip Maneephan
2012	(Chinese Taipei) Hsiao Mei-yu	(South Korea) Gu Sung-eun	(Thailand) Jutatip Maneephan
2013	(Chinese Taipei) Hsiao Mei-yu	(China) Liu Xiaohui	(China) Zhao Na
2014	(Chinese Taipei) Hsiao Mei-yu	(Hong Kong) Diao Xiao Juan	(South Korea) Gu Sung-eun
2015	(Chinese Taipei) Huang Ting-ying	(Chinese Taipei) Hsiao Mei-yu	(Hong Kong) Zhao Juan Meng
2016	(South Korea) Na Ah-reum	(China) Pu Yixian	(Japan) Mayuko Hagiwara
2017	(Hong Kong) Yang Qianyu	(South Korea) Na Ah-reum	(Japan) Miho Yoshikawa
2018	(Vietnam) Nguyễn Thị Thật	(Chinese Taipei) Huang Ting-ying	(Chinese Taipei) Chang Yao
2019	(Uzbekistan) Olga Zabelinskaya	(South Korea) Na Ah-reum	(Iran) Somayeh Yazdani
2022	(Vietnam) Nguyễn Thị Thật	(Kazakhstan) Makhabbat Umutzhanova	(Kazakhstan) Anzhela Solovyeva
2023	(Vietnam) Nguyễn Thị Thật	(China) Sun Jiajun	(Thailand) Jutatip Maneephan
2024	(South Korea) Song Min-ji	(Vietnam) Nguyễn Thị Thật	(China) Tang Xin
2025	(Thailand) Jutatip Maneephan	(Vietnam) Nguyễn Thị Thật	(Hong Kong) Lee Sze Wing

=== Individual time trial ===
Year	(gold) Gold Medal	(silver) Silver Medal	(bronze) Bronze Medal
1995	(China) Ma Huizhen	(South Korea) Song Chung-mi	(Chinese Taipei) Chang Hsu-ying
1999	(China) Zhao Haijuan	(South Korea) Shim Jung-hwa	(Japan) Miyoko Karami
2001	(South Korea) Lim Hang-jun	(Japan) Miho Oki	(Chinese Taipei) Chen Chiung-yi
2002	(China) Li Meifang	(China) Yuan Yange	(Thailand) Monrudee Chapookam
2003	(China) Li Meifang	(South Korea) Han Song-hee	(Japan) Ayumi Otsuka
2004	(China) Li Meifang	(Japan) Miyoko Karami	(China) Zhang Junying
2005	(China) Li Meifang	(South Korea) Han Song-hee	(Chinese Taipei) Huang Ho-Hsun
2006	(China) Wang Li	(South Korea) Lee Min-hye	(Japan) Satomi Wadami
2007	(China) Li Meifang	(South Korea) Lee Min-hye	(Japan) Miho Oki
2008	(China) Li Meifang	(China) Liu Yongli	(Japan) Mayuko Hagiwara
2009	(China) Tang Kerong	(Thailand) Chanpeng Nontasin	(Kazakhstan) Marina Andreichenko
2010	(South Korea) Son Eun-ju	(Japan) Mayuko Hagiwara	(Thailand) Monrudee Chapookam
2011	(Thailand) Chanpeng Nontasin	(South Korea) Son Eun-ju	(Hong Kong) Jamie Wong
2012	(South Korea) Na Ah-reum	(Japan) Minami Uwano	(China) Wang Cui
2013	(Mongolia) Tüvshinjargalyn Enkhjargal	(Japan) Minami Uwano	(Hong Kong) Jamie Wong
2014	(South Korea) Na Ah-reum	(Japan) Eri Yonamine	(Mongolia) Tüvshinjargalyn Enkhjargal
2015	(South Korea) Na Ah-reum	(Japan) Mayuko Hagiwara	(Mongolia) Tüvshinjargalyn Enkhjargal
2016	(Japan) Mayuko Hagiwara	(South Korea) Lee Ju-mi	(Hong Kong) Pang Yao
2017	(China) Liang Hongyu	(South Korea) Lee Ju-mi	(Japan) Yumi Kajihara
2018	(South Korea) Lee Ju-mi	(Chinese Taipei) Huang Ting-ying	(Japan) Miyoko Karami
2019	(Uzbekistan) Olga Zabelinskaya	(South Korea) Lee Ju-mi	(Chinese Taipei) Huang Ting-ying
2022	(Kazakhstan) Rinata Sultanova	(Indonesia) Ayustina Delia Priatna	(Mongolia) Tserenlkhamyn Solongo
2023	(Uzbekistan) Olga Zabelinskaya	(South Korea) Na Ah-reum	(Kazakhstan) Rinata Sultanova
2024	(Uzbekistan) Olga Zabelinskaya	(Uzbekistan) Yanina Kuskova	(Kazakhstan) Rinata Sultanova
2025	(Uzbekistan) Yanina Kuskova	(United Arab Emirates) Safia Al-Sayegh	(Japan) Tsuyaka Uchino

=== Team time trial ===
Year	(gold) Gold Medal	(silver) Silver Medal	(bronze) Bronze Medal
2019	South Korea; Yu Seon-ha; Lee Ju-mi; Kang Hyeong-yeong; Na Ah-reum	Kazakhstan; Natalya Saifutdinova; Zhanerke Sanakbayeva; Makhabbat Umutzhanova; Amiliya Iskakova; Viktoriya Pastarnak; Faina Potapova	Hong Kong; Ma Yin Yu; Pang Yao; Leung Hoi Wah; Leung Wing Yee; Yang Qianyu; Ng Sze Wing
2022	Uzbekistan; Shakhnoza Abdullaeva; Yanina Kuskova; Margarita Misyurina; Anna Kulikova	Kazakhstan; Rinata Sultanova; Faina Potapova; Makhabbat Umutzhanova; Anzhela Solovyeva	Iran; Mandana Dehghan; Reihaneh Khatouni; Sajedeh Sayyahian; Somayyeh Yazdani

== Mixed road events ==
=== Mixed relay ===
Year	(gold) Gold Medal	(silver) Silver Medal	(bronze) Bronze Medal
2023	Kazakhstan; Yevgeniy Fedorov; Dmitriy Gruzdev; Igor Chzhan; Makhabbat Umutzhanova; Rinata Sultanova; Marina Kuzmina	Uzbekistan; Aleksey Fomovskiy; Dmitriy Bocharov; Bekhzodbek Rakhimbaev; Olga Zabelinskaya; Evgeniya Golotina; Yanina Kuskova	China; Niu Yikui; Bai Lijun; Liu Jiankun; Sun Jiajun; Wang Tingting; Cui Yuhang
2024	Kazakhstan; Yevgeniy Fedorov; Igor Chzhan; Dmitriy Gruzdev; Rinata Sultanova; Makhabbat Umutzhanova; Faina Potapova	Uzbekistan; Muradjan Khalmuratov; Danil Evdokimov; Bekhzodbek Rakhimbaev; Olga Zabelinskaya; Yanina Kuskova; Margarita Misyurina	Hong Kong; Vincent Lau; Ng Pak Hang; Chu Tsun Wai; Lee Sze Wing; Leung Bo Yee; Leung Wing Yee
2025	Kazakhstan; Anzhela Solovyeva; Rinata Sultanova; Makhabbat Umutzhanova; Yevgeniy Fedorov; Dmitriy Gruzdev; Anton Kuzmin	Japan; Tsuyaka Uchino; Mizuki Ikeda; Maho Kakita; Yukiya Arashiro; Yūma Koishi; Koki Kamada	Hong Kong; Lee Sze Wing; Leung Wing Yee; Yang Qianyu; Vincent Lau Wan Yau; Mow Ching Yin; Ng Pak Hang

== Men's track events ==
=== Sprint ===
Year	(gold) Gold Medal	(silver) Silver Medal	(bronze) Bronze Medal
1995	(South Korea) Hyun Byung-chul	(Japan) Kazuhiro Kaida	(Japan) Toshinobu Saito
1999	(Japan) Hideki Yamada	(Japan) Noriaki Mabuchi	(South Korea) Hyun Byung-chul
2001	(Japan) Takashi Kaneko	(South Korea) Cho Hyun-ok	(Japan) Hiroyuki Nunoi
2002	(Japan) Kiyofumi Nagai	(Chinese Taipei) Wu Hsien-tang	(China) Gao Zhiguo
2003	(South Korea) Kim Chi-bum	(Japan) Yuichiro Maesori	(Japan) Hiroyuki Inagaki
2004	(Japan) Hiroyuki Inagaki	(Japan) Tsubasa Kitatsuru	(South Korea) Jeon Yeong-gyu
2005	(Japan) Tsubasa Kitatsuru	(China) Zhang Lei	(China) Gao Yahui
2006	(Japan) Tsubasa Kitatsuru	(China) Zhang Lei	(Japan) Kazuya Narita
2007	(Japan) Tsubasa Kitatsuru	(Japan) Kazunari Watanabe	(Malaysia) Josiah Ng
2008	(Malaysia) Azizulhasni Awang	(South Korea) Choi Lae-seon	(China) Tang Qi
2009	(Malaysia) Azizulhasni Awang	(Japan) Kazunari Watanabe	(China) Bao Saifei
2010	(China) Zhang Miao	(South Korea) Kang Dong-jin	(Japan) Yudai Nitta
2011	(Japan) Tsubasa Kitatsuru	(China) Zhang Miao	(Malaysia) Azizulhasni Awang
2012	(Japan) Kazunari Watanabe	(Malaysia) Azizulhasni Awang	(China) Zhang Lei
2013	(Malaysia) Josiah Ng	(Iran) Hassan Ali Varposhti	(South Korea) Choi Lae-seon
2014	(Malaysia) Azizulhasni Awang	(Japan) Seiichiro Nakagawa	(South Korea) Kang Dong-jin
2015	(Japan) Tomoyuki Kawabata	(Malaysia) Azizulhasni Awang	(South Korea) Kang Dong-jin
2016	(South Korea) Im Chae-bin	(China) Xu Chao	(Malaysia) Azizulhasni Awang
2017	(Malaysia) Azizulhasni Awang	(Japan) Tomoyuki Kawabata	(Japan) Yuta Wakimoto
2018	(Japan) Kazunari Watanabe	(Malaysia) Azizulhasni Awang	(South Korea) Im Chae-bin
2019	(Malaysia) Azizulhasni Awang	(China) Xu Chao	(Malaysia) Muhammad Shah Firdaus Sahrom
2020	(Malaysia) Azizulhasni Awang	(Japan) Yuta Wakimoto	(Japan) Tomohiro Fukaya
2022	(Japan) Kento Yamasaki	(India) Ronaldo Laitonjam	(Kazakhstan) Andrey Chugay
2023	(Malaysia) Azizulhasni Awang	(Japan) Kaiya Ota	(Japan) Kento Yamasaki
2024	(Japan) Yuta Obara	(China) Li Zhiwei	(Malaysia) Shah Firdaus Sahrom

=== 1 km time trial ===
Year	(gold) Gold Medal	(silver) Silver Medal	(bronze) Bronze Medal
1971	(Japan) Yaichi Numata	(Philippines) Benjamin Evangelista	(Malaysia) Daud Ibrahim
1995	(Japan) Narihiro Inamura	(South Korea) Hong Suk-hwan	(Japan) Masanaga Shiohara
1999	(Japan) Narihiro Inamura	(South Korea) Ji Sung-hwan	(South Korea) Hong Suk-hwan
2001	(Japan) Keiichi Omori	(South Korea) Song Kyung-bang	(Chinese Taipei) Huang Chih-ying
2002	(Japan) Keiichi Omori	(Chinese Taipei) Lin Chih-hsan	(China) Yan Liheng
2003	(Japan) Masaki Inoue	(China) Guo Jianbin	(Chinese Taipei) Liu Chin-feng
2004	(Japan) Masaki Inoue	(Japan) Keiichiro Yaguchi	(China) Ma Yajun
2006	(South Korea) Kang Dong-jin	(Japan) Yusho Oikawa	(China) Wu Dan
2007	(China) Li Wenhao	(South Korea) Kang Dong-jin	(Malaysia) Mohd Rizal Tisin
2008	(Malaysia) Mohd Rizal Tisin	(China) Li Wenhao	(Japan) Yudai Nitta
2009	(China) Han Tao	(Malaysia) Mohd Rizal Tisin	(Hong Kong) Wong Kin Chung
2010	(China) Zhang Miao	(Malaysia) Mohd Hafiz Sufian	(Japan) Yudai Nitta
2011	(Malaysia) Mohd Rizal Tisin	(China) Zhang Miao	(South Korea) Han Jae-ho
2012	(Malaysia) Mohd Edrus Yunus	(Iran) Mahmoud Parash	(Hong Kong) Wu Lok Chun
2013	(South Korea) Jun Won-gu	(Japan) Kenta Inake	(Chinese Taipei) Hsiao Shih-hsin
2014	(South Korea) Im Chae-bin	(Japan) Yuka Wakimoto	(Hong Kong) Wu Lok Chun
2015	(South Korea) Im Chae-bin	(Hong Kong) Wu Lok Chun	(Iran) Ehsan Khademi
2016	(Iran) Mohammad Daneshvar	(Japan) Shugo Hayasaka	(South Korea) Kim Woo-gyeom
2017	(Iran) Mohammad Daneshvar	(Chinese Taipei) Hsiao Shih-hsin	(South Korea) Na Jung-gyu
2018	(Japan) Tomohiro Fukaya	(Chinese Taipei) Hsiao Shih-hsin	(Iran) Mohammad Daneshvar
2019	(Kazakhstan) Sergey Ponomaryov	(Chinese Taipei) Hsiao Shih-hsin	(South Korea) Kim Jun-cheol
2020	(Kazakhstan) Andrey Chugay	(Malaysia) Fadhil Zonis	(China) Liu Qi
2022	(Japan) Yuta Obara	(Malaysia) Fadhil Zonis	(India) Ronaldo Laitonjam
2023	(Malaysia) Fadhil Zonis	(India) Ronaldo Laitonjam	(South Korea) Choi Woo-rim
2024	(China) Li Zhiwei	(Japan) Minato Nakaishi	(Kazakhstan) Kirill Kurdidi

=== Keirin ===
Year	(gold) Gold Medal	(silver) Silver Medal	(bronze) Bronze Medal
1995	(Japan) Masanaga Shiohara	(Japan) Tsutomu Yokota	
1999	(Japan) Shinichi Ota	(Japan) Yuichiro Kamiyama	(South Korea) Eum In-young
2001	(Japan) Toshiaki Fushimi	(Japan) Hisanori Uchibayashi	(South Korea) Kim Chi-bum
2002	(Japan) Hiroshi Tsutsumi	(Japan) Masaya Kurita	(China) Shi Qingyu
2003	(Japan) Keiichiro Yaguchi	(Japan) Shinichi Ota	(South Korea) Kim Chi-bum
2004	(Japan) Keiichiro Yaguchi	(South Korea) Choi Jeong-wook	(Japan) Hiroyuki Inagaki
2005	(South Korea) Cho Ho-sung	(Japan) Tsubasa Kitatsuru	(China) Zhang Lei
2006	(Malaysia) Mohd Rizal Tisin	(Japan) Hiroyuki Inagaki	(Hong Kong) Wong Kin Chung
2007	(Malaysia) Azizulhasni Awang	(Japan) Toshiaki Fushimi	(Iran) Mahmoud Parash
2008	(Malaysia) Azizulhasni Awang	(Japan) Kiyofumi Nagai	(South Korea) Choi Lae-seon
2009	(Japan) Kazunari Watanabe	(Malaysia) Mohd Hafiz Sufian	(Iran) Mahmoud Parash
2010	(Japan) Kazunari Watanabe	(Japan) Kazuya Narita	(Malaysia) Mohd Hafiz Sufian
2011	(Japan) Kota Asai	(Malaysia) Josiah Ng	(Malaysia) Azizulhasni Awang
2012	(Malaysia) Josiah Ng	(Malaysia) Azizulhasni Awang	(Japan) Kazunari Watanabe
2013	(Malaysia) Josiah Ng	(Iran) Mahmoud Parash	(South Korea) Jun Won-gu
2014	(Japan) Yuta Wakimoto	(Malaysia) Azizulhasni Awang	(South Korea) Im Chae-bin
2015	(Malaysia) Azizulhasni Awang	(Japan) Kazunari Watanabe	(Thailand) Worayut Kapunya
2016	(South Korea) Im Chae-bin	(China) Xu Chao	(Malaysia) Azizulhasni Awang
2017	(Japan) Yuta Wakimoto	(Japan) Kazunari Watanabe	(Malaysia) Shah Firdaus Sahrom
2018	(Japan) Tomoyuki Kawabata	(South Korea) Im Chae-bin	(Malaysia) Azizulhasni Awang
2019	(Japan) Yuta Wakimoto	(Malaysia) Muhammad Shah Firdaus Sahrom	(Japan) Tomoyuki Kawabata
2020	(Japan) Yuta Wakimoto	(Malaysia) Azizulhasni Awang	(Japan) Yudai Nitta
2022	(Japan) Kohei Terasaki	(Malaysia) Muhammad Shah Firdaus Sahrom	(Kazakhstan) Sergey Ponomaryov
2023	(Malaysia) Azizulhasni Awang	(Japan) Shinji Nakano	(Malaysia) Muhammad Shah Firdaus Sahrom
2024	(Japan) Kento Yamasaki	(China) Li Zhiwei	(Hong Kong) Yung Tsun Ho

=== Individual pursuit ===
Year	(gold) Gold Medal	(silver) Silver Medal	(bronze) Bronze Medal
1971	(Japan) Kazumasa Yamamoto	(South Korea) Kwon Jung-hyun	(Philippines) Romin Salamante
1995	(Kazakhstan) Vadim Kravchenko	(Kyrgyzstan) Eugen Wacker	
1999	(Kazakhstan) Vadim Kravchenko	(Hong Kong) Wong Kam-po	(Japan) Noriyuki Iijima
2001	(Kazakhstan) Vadim Kravchenko	(Japan) Noriyuki Iijima	(Hong Kong) Wong Kam-po
2002	(Japan) Noriyuki Iijima	(Iran) Hossein Askari	(Hong Kong) Wong Kam-po
2003	(Iran) Alireza Haghi	(South Korea) Jang Sun-jae	(Kazakhstan) Vladimir Bushanskiy
2004	(Japan) Kei Uchida	(Iran) Hossein Askari	(Iran) Alireza Haghi
2005	(South Korea) Jang Sun-jae	(Kazakhstan) Alexey Lyalko	(South Korea) Joo Hyun-wook
2006	(South Korea) Jang Sun-jae	(South Korea) Hwang In-hyeok	(Japan) Kei Uchida
2007	(South Korea) Hwang In-hyeok	(Iran) Mehdi Sohrabi	(Iran) Amir Zargari
2008	(Iran) Hossein Nateghi	(Kazakhstan) Alexey Kolessov	(South Korea) Kim Dong-hun
2009	(China) Li Wei	(Uzbekistan) Vladimir Tuychiev	(Chinese Taipei) Feng Chun-kai
2010	(South Korea) Jang Sun-jae	(Chinese Taipei) Feng Chun-kai	(Iran) Hossein Askari
2011	(South Korea) Jang Sun-jae	(Iran) Alireza Haghi	(Japan) Kazushige Kuboki
2012	(Iran) Alireza Haghi	(Hong Kong) Cheung King Lok	(Uzbekistan) Vladimir Tuychiev
2013	(South Korea) Jang Sun-jae	(Kazakhstan) Dias Omirzakov	(Iran) Alireza Haghi
2014	(South Korea) Im Jae-yeon	(China) Yuan Zhong	(Iran) Behnam Khalilikhosroshahi
2015	(South Korea) Park Sang-hoon	(Hong Kong) Cheung King Lok	(Japan) Ryo Chikatani
2016	(Hong Kong) Cheung King Lok	(Kazakhstan) Dias Omirzakov	(South Korea) Min Kyeong-ho
2017	(South Korea) Park Sang-hoon	(Kazakhstan) Artyom Zakharov	(Chinese Taipei) Li Wen-chao
2018	(Japan) Ryo Chikatani	(South Korea) Min Kyeong-ho	(Kazakhstan) Artyom Zakharov
2019	(South Korea) Min Kyeong-ho	(Kazakhstan) Alisher Zhumakan	(Chinese Taipei) Li Wen-chao
2020	(South Korea) Park Sang-hoon	(Kazakhstan) Alisher Zhumakan	(South Korea) Min Kyeong-ho
2022	(Japan) Shoi Matsuda	(South Korea) Park Sang-hoon	(India) Vishavjeet Singh
2023	(Japan) Kazushige Kuboki	(Japan) Shoi Matsuda	(China) Zhang Haiao
2024	(Japan) Shoi Matsuda	(United Arab Emirates) Mohammad Al-Mutaiwei	(Hong Kong) Ng Pak Hang

=== Points race ===
Year	(gold) Gold Medal	(silver) Silver Medal	(bronze) Bronze Medal
1995	(Japan) Masahiro Yasuhara	(Japan) Daisaku Takahashi	(Kazakhstan) Sergey Lavrinenko
2001	(South Korea) Cho Ho-sung	(South Korea) Chun Dae-hong	(Japan) Makoto Iijima
2002	(Japan) Makoto Iijima	(Japan) Noriyuki Iijima	(Hong Kong) Wong Kam-po
2003	(South Korea) Song Kyung-bang	(Iran) Mehdi Sohrabi	(Japan) Taiji Nishitani
2004	(South Korea) Song Kyung-bang	(Japan) Wong Kam-po	(Iran) Abbas Saeidi Tanha
2005	(Kazakhstan) Alexey Lyalko	(South Korea) Youm Jung-hwan	(Japan) Makoto Iijima
2006	(Japan) Makoto Iijima	(Iran) Hossein Askari	(Hong Kong) Cheung King Wai
2007	(Chinese Taipei) Feng Chun-kai	(Japan) Kazuhiro Mori	(Japan) Makoto Iijima
2008	(Kazakhstan) Ilya Chernyshov	(Japan) Kazuhiro Mori	(Uzbekistan) Vadim Shaekhov
2009	(Uzbekistan) Vladimir Tuychiev	(Japan) Kazuhiro Mori	(Hong Kong) Kwok Ho Ting
2010	(South Korea) Cho Ho-sung	(Iran) Amir Zargari	(Hong Kong) Kwok Ho Ting
2011	(Iran) Mohammad Rajabloo	(South Korea) Park Sung-baek	(Malaysia) Adiq Husainie Othman
2012	(Japan) Kazuhiro Mori	(Iran) Mohammad Rajabloo	(South Korea) Choi Seung-woo
2013	(South Korea) Cho Ho-sung	(Hong Kong) Choi Ki Ho	(Iran) Mohammad Rajabloo
2014	(Hong Kong) Cheung King Lok	(Chinese Taipei) Feng Chun Kai	(Iran) Mohammad Rajabloo
2015	(Japan) Takuto Kurabayashi	(United Arab Emirates) Yousif Mirza Al Hammadi	(South Korea) Shin Don-gin
2016	(South Korea) Min Kyeong-ho	(Hong Kong) Cheung King Lok	(Chinese Taipei) Chen Chien-liang
2017	(Japan) Takuto Kurabayashi	(Chinese Taipei) Chen Chien-chou	(United Arab Emirates) Yousif Mirza
2018	(United Arab Emirates) Yousif Mirza	(Hong Kong) Cheung King Lok	(Uzbekistan) Muradjan Khalmuratov
2019	(South Korea) Park Sang-hoon	(Kazakhstan) Artyom Zakharov	(Uzbekistan) Muradjan Khalmuratov
2020	(South Korea) Kim Eu-ro	(Indonesia) Bernard Van Aert	(Kazakhstan) Roman Vassilenkov
2022	(United Arab Emirates) Yousif Mirza	(South Korea) Kim Eu-ro	(Japan) Naoki Kojima
2023	(Japan) Naoki Kojima	(Chinese Taipei) Chang Chih-sheng	(Hong Kong) Mow Ching Yin
2024	(Japan) Naoki Kojima	(Kazakhstan) Alisher Zhumakan	(Hong Kong) Mow Ching Yin

=== Scratch ===
Year	(gold) Gold Medal	(silver) Silver Medal	(bronze) Bronze Medal
2003	(South Korea) Song Kyung-bang	(Iran) Mehdi Sohrabi	(Iran) Alireza Haghi
2004	(Japan) Kei Uchida	(China) Wang Guozhang	(Hong Kong) Wong Kam-po
2005	(South Korea) You Tae-bok	(Japan) Kazuhiro Mori	(Kazakhstan) Alexey Zaitsev
2006	(South Korea) You Tae-bok	(Malaysia) Mohd Sayuti Mohd Zahit	(Hong Kong) Wong Kam-po
2007	(Malaysia) Mohamed Harrif Salleh	(Japan) Reona Sumi	(Thailand) Suphat Theerawanitchanan
2008	(Japan) Reona Sumi	(Uzbekistan) Temur Mukhamedov	(Chinese Taipei) Lee Wei-cheng
2009	(Iran) Mehdi Sohrabi	(Kazakhstan) Ilya Chernyshov	(Hong Kong) Wong Kam-po
2010	(South Korea) Choe Hyeong-min	(Kazakhstan) Evgeniy Sladkov	(Thailand) Turakit Boonratanathanakorn
2011	(South Korea) Jang Sun-jae	(Iran) Arvin Moazzami	(Thailand) Turakit Boonratanathanakorn
2012	(Chinese Taipei) Feng Chun-kai	(Thailand) Turakit Boonratanathanakorn	(Malaysia) Mohamed Harrif Salleh
2013	(South Korea) Cho Ho-sung	(Iran) Hossein Nateghi	(Chinese Taipei) Liu Chih-feng
2014	(South Korea) Cho Ho-sung	(Iran) Behnam Khalilikhosroshahi	(Chinese Taipei) Feng Chun-kai
2015	(Iran) Behnam Khalilikhosroshahi	(Philippines) Jan Paul Morales	(Chinese Taipei) Liu Chin-feng
2016	(Japan) Takuto Kurabayashi	(Kazakhstan) Robert Gaineyev	(South Korea) Park Keon-woo
2017	(Hong Kong) Leung Chun Wing	(Iran) Mohammad Rajabloo	(Kazakhstan) Robert Gaineyev
2018	(China) Guo Liang	(Iran) Arvin Moazemi Godarzi	(Mongolia) Batsaikhan Tegshbayar
2019	(Thailand) Patompob Phonarjthan	(Mongolia) Batsaikhan Tegshbayar	(Hong Kong) Leung Ka Yu
2020	(Hong Kong) Mow Ching Yin	(Kazakhstan) Alisher Zhumakan	(Indonesia) Bernard Van Aert
2022	(Japan) Eiya Hashimoto	(Indonesia) Terry Yudha Kusuma	(Iran) Mohammad Ganjkhanloo
2023	(Iran) Mohammad Ganjkhanloo	(Japan) Shunsuke Imamura	(Kazakhstan) Ruslan Yelyubayev
2024	(Indonesia) Terry Yudha Kusuma	(Japan) Shunsuke Imamura	(South Korea) Kim Hyeon-seok

=== Omnium ===
Year	(gold) Gold Medal	(silver) Silver Medal	(bronze) Bronze Medal
2008	(Chinese Taipei) Wu Po-hung	(Kazakhstan) Alexey Lyalko	(Hong Kong) Kwok Ho Ting
2009	(Hong Kong) Kwok Ho Ting	(Chinese Taipei) Wu Po-hung	(Japan) Ryu Sasaki
2010	(South Korea) Cho Ho-sung	(Japan) Kazuhiro Mori	(Chinese Taipei) Wu Po-hung
2011	(South Korea) Cho Ho-sung	(Hong Kong) Kwok Ho Ting	(Japan) Kazuhiro Mori
2012	(Kazakhstan) Alexey Lyalko	(South Korea) Jang Sun-jae	(Hong Kong) Kwok Ho Ting
2013	(Kazakhstan) Artyom Zakharov	(China) Shan Shuang	(Japan) Kazushige Kuboki
2014	(China) Liu Hao	(Japan) Eiya Hashimoto	(Hong Kong) Cheung King Lok
2015	(Uzbekistan) Timur Gumerov	(South Korea) Im Jae-yeon	(Kazakhstan) Artyom Zakharov
2016	(Japan) Eiya Hashimoto	(Kazakhstan) Artyom Zakharov	(China) Liu Hao
2017	(Kazakhstan) Sultanmurat Miraliyev	(Hong Kong) Leung Chun Wing	(South Korea) Kim Ok-cheol
2018	(Japan) Eiya Hashimoto	(United Arab Emirates) Yousif Mirza	(Kazakhstan) Artyom Zakharov
2019	(Japan) Eiya Hashimoto	(United Arab Emirates) Yousif Mirza	(South Korea) Shin Dong-in
2020	(Japan) Eiya Hashimoto	(Kazakhstan) Artyom Zakharov	(South Korea) Shin Dong-in
2022	(Japan) Shunsuke Imamura	(Kazakhstan) Artyom Zakharov	(Iran) Mohammad Ganjkhanloo
2023	(Japan) Eiya Hashimoto	(Kazakhstan) Artyom Zakharov	(South Korea) Park Sang-hoon
2024	(Japan) Eiya Hashimoto	(Indonesia) Bernard Van Aert	(Hong Kong) Tso Kai Kwong

=== Madison ===
Year	(gold) Gold Medal	(silver) Silver Medal	(bronze) Bronze Medal
1999	Iran; Alireza Haghi; Moezeddin Seyed-Rezaei	Japan	Hong Kong; Wong Kam-po; Ho Siu Lun
2001	Japan	Iran; Amir Zargari; Alireza Haghi	Hong Kong
2003	Kazakhstan; Yuriy Yuda; Vladimir Bushanskiy	South Korea; Kwak Hoon-sin; Suh Seok-kyu	Iran; Amir Zargari; Abbas Saeidi Tanha
2004	China; Shi Guijun; Wang Guozhang	Japan; Taiji Nishitani; Kazuhiro Mori	South Korea; Choi Dae-yong; Lee Hyun-gu
2006	South Korea; Youm Jung-hwan; Park Sung-baek	Hong Kong; Cheung King Wai; Wong Kam-po	Iran; Mehdi Sohrabi; Amir Zargari
2007	South Korea; Jang Sun-jae; Jang Chan-jae	Japan; Makoto Iijima; Kazuhiro Mori	Iran; Mehdi Sohrabi; Amir Zargari
2008	Hong Kong; Wong Kam-po; Kwok Ho Ting	Uzbekistan; Vadim Shaekhov; Temur Mukhamedov	South Korea; Shin Dong-hyun; Lee Chan-woo
2009	Hong Kong; Kwok Ho Ting; Wong Kam-po	Japan; Kazuhiro Mori; Masakazu Ito	Kazakhstan; Sergey Kuzin; Ilya Chernyshov
2010	South Korea; Jang Sun-jae; Park Seon-ho	Hong Kong; Wong Kam-po; Choi Ki Ho	Japan; Ryu Sasaki; Yu Motosuna
2011	Hong Kong; Kwok Ho Ting; Choi Ki Ho	Iran; Alireza Haghi; Mohammad Rajabloo	Japan; Kazushige Kuboki; Taiji Nishitani
2012	Hong Kong; Cheung King Lok; Choi Ki Ho	Kazakhstan; Artyom Zakharov; Pavel Gatskiy	Iran; Amir Zargari; Abbas Saeidi Tanha
2013	Hong Kong; Choi Ki Ho; Kwok Ho Ting	South Korea; Choi Seung-woo; Jang Sun-jae	Iran; Alireza Haghi; Mohammad Rajabloo
2014	Hong Kong; Cheung King Lok; Leung Chun Wing	Kazakhstan; Nikita Panassenko; Pavel Gatskiy	South Korea; Jang Sun-jae; Park Keon-woo
2015	Hong Kong; Cheung King Lok; Leung Chun Wing	Iran; Amir Zargari; Arvin Moazami Godarzi	South Korea; Park Keon-woo; Choi Seung-woo
2016	South Korea; Park Keon-woo; Shin Dong-in	Hong Kong; Cheung King Lok; Leung Chun Wing	Kazakhstan; Nikita Panassenko; Robert Gaineyev
2017	South Korea; Park Sang-hoon; Im Jae-yeon	Kazakhstan; Sultanmurat Miraliyev; Artyom Zakharov	Japan; Taisei Kobayashi; Minori Shimmura
2018	Hong Kong; Cheung King Lok; Leung Chun Wing	Iran; Mohammad Rajabloo; Mehdi Sohrabi	South Korea; Im Jae-yeon; Kim Ok-cheol
2019	South Korea; Im Jae-yeon; Kim Ok-cheol	China; Guo Liang; Shen Pingan	Japan; Eiya Hashimoto; Kazushige Kuboki
2020	South Korea; Shin Dong-in; Kim Eu-ro	Japan; Eiya Hashimoto; Kazushige Kuboki	Kazakhstan; Artyom Zakharov; Roman Vassilenkov
2022	Japan; Shunsuke Imamura; Kazushige Kuboki	South Korea; Park Sang-hoon; Min Kyeong-ho	Kazakhstan; Artyom Zakharov; Alisher Zhumakan
2023	Japan; Shunsuke Imamura; Kazushige Kuboki	Hong Kong; Leung Ka Yu; Leung Chun Wing	Indonesia; Bernard Van Aert; Terry Yudha Kusuma
2024	Japan; Shunsuke Imamura; Kazushige Kuboki	Indonesia; Bernard Van Aert; Terry Yudha Kusuma	Kazakhstan; Ramis Dinmukhametov; Alisher Zhumakan

=== Team sprint ===
Year	(gold) Gold Medal	(silver) Silver Medal	(bronze) Bronze Medal
1999	Japan; Narihiro Inamura; Toshiaki Fushimi; Takanobu Jumonji	South Korea; Hyun Byung-Chul; Hong Suk-Hwan; Ji Sung-Hwan	Chinese Taipei; Cheng Keng-hsien; Wu Hsien-tang; Tseng Chi-ming
2001	Japan; Takashi Kaneko; Hiroyuki Nunoi; Keiichi Omori	South Korea; Cho Hyun-ok; Song Kyung-bang; Kim Chi-bum	Chinese Taipei; Liu Chih-feng; Lin Chih-hsun; Lin Kun-hung
2002	Japan; Keiichi Omori; Kiyofumi Nagai; Tomohiro Nagatsuka	China	Chinese Taipei
2003	Japan; Masaki Inoue; Yuichiro Maesori; Hiroyuki Inagaki	South Korea	Chinese Taipei
2004	Japan; Keiichiro Yaguchi; Masaki Inoue; Keiichi Omori	Chinese Taipei	South Korea; Choi Jeong-wook; Jeon Yeong-gyu
2005	China; Zhang Lei; Feng Yong; Gao Yahui	South Korea; Jeon Yeong-gyu; Kim Chi-bum; Cho Ho-sung	Malaysia; Junaidi Mohd Nasir; Mohd Rizal Tisin; Mohd Hafiz Sufian
2006	China; Zhang Lei; Wu Dan; Lin Feng	Japan; Kazuya Narita; Tsubasa Kitatsuru; Yudai Nitta	Malaysia; Mohd Rizal Tisin; Mohd Hafiz Sufian; Junaidi Mohd Nasir
2007	China; Feng Yong; Lin Feng; Zhang Lei	South Korea; Kang Dong-jin; Choi Lae-seon; Park Soo-hyun	Iran; Farshid Farsinejadian; Mahmoud Parash; Hassan Ali Varposhti
2008	China; Zhang Qiang; Tang Qi; Li Wenhao	Malaysia; Azizulhasni Awang; Mohd Rizal Tisin; Mohd Edrus Yunus	Japan; Kiyofumi Nagai; Tomohiro Nagatsuka; Yudai Nitta
2009	Malaysia; Azizulhasni Awang; Mohd Edrus Yunus; Mohd Rizal Tisin	Iran; Farzin Arab; Hassan Ali Varposhti; Alireza Ahmadi	China; Zhang Qiang; Bao Saifei; Han Tao
2010	China; Cheng Changsong; Zhang Lei; Zhang Miao	Japan; Kazuya Narita; Yudai Nitta; Kazunari Watanabe	Iran; Farzin Arab; Hassan Ali Varposhti; Mahmoud Parash
2011	China; Zhang Lei; Zhang Miao; Cheng Changsong	Japan; Kazuki Amagai; Tsubasa Kitatsuru; Kota Asai	Malaysia; Josiah Ng; Mohd Edrus Yunus; Mohd Rizal Tisin
2012	China; Cheng Changsong; Zhang Lei; Zhang Miao	Japan; Seiichiro Nakagawa; Yudai Nitta; Kazunari Watanabe	Iran; Farzin Arab; Mahmoud Parash; Mohammad Parash
2013	China; Hu Ke; Tang Qi; Xu Chao	Malaysia; Arfy Qhairant Amran; Mohd Edrus Yunus; Farhan Amri Zaid	Japan; Kenta Inake; Takashi Sakamoto; Makuru Wada
2014	South Korea; Kang Dong-jin; Im Chae-bin; Son Je-yong	China; Hu Ke; Xu Chao; Bao Saifei	Japan; Seiichiro Nakagawa; Kazunari Watanabe; Yudai Nitta
2015	South Korea; Im Chae-bin; Kang Dong-jin; Son Je-yong	Japan; Yudai Nitta; Kazunari Watanabe; Kazuki Amagai	China; Xu Chao; Bao Saifei; Hu Ke
2016	South Korea; Kang Dong-jin; Im Chae-bin; Son Je-yong	China; Hu Ke; Xu Chao; Bao Saifei	Japan; Seiichiro Nakagawa; Kazunari Watanabe; Kazuki Amagai
2017	China; Gao Jianwei; Li Jianxin; Luo Yongjia	Iran; Hassan Ali Varposhti; Ali Aliaskari; Mohammad Daneshvar	Japan; Kazunari Watanabe; Kazuki Amagai; Tomoyuki Kawabata
2018	South Korea; Im Chae-bin; Park Jeo-ne; Son Je-yong	Japan; Kazunari Watanabe; Tomoyuki Kawabata; Yoshitaku Nagasako	China; Luo Yongjia; Bi Wenjun; Li Jianxin
2019	Japan; Kazuki Amagai; Yudai Nitta; Tomohiro Fukaya	China; Guo Shuai; Xu Chao; Zhou Yu	Malaysia; Mohd Azizulhasni Awang; Muhammad Fadhil Mohd Zonis; Muhammad Shah Firdaus Sahrom
2020	Japan; Kazuki Amagai; Yudai Nitta; Tomohiro Fukaya	China; Zhou Yu; Luo Yongjia; Zhang Miao	South Korea; Kim Dong-ha; Kim Cheng-su; Seok Hye-yun
2022	Japan; Yuta Obara; Kaiya Ota; Yoshitaku Nagasako; Kohei Terasaki	Malaysia; Fadhil Zonis; Shah Firdaus Sahrom; Ridwan Sahrom	India; David Beckham; Ronaldo Laitonjam; Rojit Singh Yanglem; Esow Alben
2023	Japan; Kaiya Ota; Yuta Obara; Yoshitaku Nagasako	China; Guo Shuai; Zhou Yu; Xue Chenxi	Malaysia; Fadhil Zonis; Ridwan Sahrom; Umar Hasbullah
2024	Japan; Yuta Obara; Kento Yamasaki; Minato Nakaishi	Malaysia; Ridwan Sahrom; Fadhil Zonis; Umar Hasbullah	China; Jin Zhiheng; Li Zhiwei; Liu Kuan

=== Team pursuit ===
Year	(gold) Gold Medal	(silver) Silver Medal	(bronze) Bronze Medal
1963	Malaya	Iran	South Vietnam
1971	Japan; Takeo Ota; Masayuki Hasebe; Yaichi Numata; Kenichi Ono	South Korea; Suk Choon-Bong; Kim Kwang-sun; Ro Hae-soo; Kwon Jung-kook	Thailand; Suriya Saechia; Vitaya Poontharikapan; Cherdchoo Sukkato; Pinit Kaykopkaew
1995	South Korea	Japan	
1999	Japan; Noriyuki Iijima; Toshibumi Kodama; Isao Matsuzaki; Shinya Sakamoto	South Korea; Cho Hyun-ok; Kwan Ki-bak; Hong Suk-hwan; Noh Young-shik	Iran; Alireza Haghi; Mousa Arbati; Reza Raz; Hassan Maleki; Amir Zargari
2001	South Korea; Choi Soon-young; Chun Dae-hong; Cho Ho-sung; Chang Il-nam	Chinese Taipei; Chen Teng-tian; Pai Chi-lin; Ting Cheng-chang; Tsai Shao-yu	Japan; Noriyuki Iijima; Yusuke Kuroki; Megumu Morohashi; Kanotoshi Madoba
2002	China	Iran; Hossein Askari; Amir Zargari; Abbas Saeidi Tanha; Mousa Arbati; Alireza Haghi	Japan
2003	South Korea; Song Kyung-bang; Choi Soon-young; Jang Sun-jae; Kwak Hoon-sin	Iran; Alireza Haghi; Mehdi Sohrabi; Abbas Saeidi Tanha; Amir Zargari; Hossein Askari	Japan; Takashi Sasaki; Kei Uchida; Taiji Nishitani; Yusuke Kuroki
2004	South Korea; Choi Dae-yong; Song Kyung-bang; Park Sun-ho; Lee Hyun-gu	Iran; Mehdi Sohrabi; Amir Zargari; Hossein Askari; Alireza Haghi	Japan; Kei Uchida; Taiji Nishitani; Yusuke Kuroki; Kazuhiro Mori
2005	South Korea; Jang Sun-jae; Park Sung-baek; Cho Hyun-ok; Youm Jung-hwan	Iran; Mehdi Sohrabi; Amir Zargari; Hossein Askari; Alireza Haghi	Japan; Tadashi Iijima; Makoto Iijima; Taiji Nishitani; Kazuhiro Mori
2006	South Korea; Jang Sun-jae; Park Sung-baek; Youm Jung-hwan; Kim Dong-hun	Iran; Ghader Mizbani; Alireza Haghi; Abbas Saeidi Tanha; Amir Zargari	Chinese Taipei; Liu Chin-feng; Lee Wei-cheng; Lin Heng-hui; Chen Chien-ting
2007	China; Li Wei; Qu Xuelong; Chen Libin; Ma Teng	Iran; Amir Zargari; Alireza Haghi; Hossein Nateghi; Mehdi Sohrabi	South Korea; Jang Sun-jae; Jang Chan-jae; Hwang In-hyeok; Kim Tae-Gyun
2008	China; Li Wei; Qu Xuelong; Chen Libin; Ma Teng	Iran; Amir Zargari; Mostafa Seyed-Rezaei; Mehdi Sohrabi; Hossein Nateghi; Abbas Saeidi Tanha	Japan; Makoto Iijima; Kazuhiro Mori; Reona Sumi; Takayuki Kawanishi
2009	China; Li Wei; Qu Xuelong; Ma Teng; Chen Libin	Iran; Arvin Moazzami; Alireza Haghi; Behnam Khosroshahi; Hossein Nateghi	Kazakhstan; Sergey Kuzin; Nikolay Ivanov; Anton Diganov; Alexey Kolessov; Maxim Gourov
2010	South Korea; Cho Ho-sung; Hwang In-hyeok; Jang Sun-jae; Park Seon-ho	China; Chen Pan; Jiang Xiao; Li Chuanmin; Wang Jie	Hong Kong; Cheung King Lok; Choi Ki Ho; Kwok Ho Ting; Wong Kam-po
2011	South Korea; Jang Sun-jae; Park Sung-baek; Park Seon-ho; Park Keon-eoo	Hong Kong; Cheung King Lok; Kwok Ho Ting; Cheung King Wai; Choi Ki Ho	Japan; Kazushige Kuboki; Yu Motosuna; Taiji Nishitani; Ryu Sasaki
2012	South Korea; Jang Sun-jae; Park Keon-eoo; Park Seon-ho; Park Sung-baek	Hong Kong; Cheung King Lok; Cheung King Wai; Choi Ki Ho; Kwok Ho Ting	Kazakhstan; Sergey Kuzin; Alexey Lyalko; Dias Omirzakov; Artyom Zakharov
2013	South Korea; Jang Sun-jae; Park Keon-eoo; Park Seon-ho; Park Sung-baek	Japan; Eiya Hashimoto; Shogo Ichimaru; Kazuki Ito; Kazushige Kuboki	Hong Kong; Cheung King Lok; Choi Ki Ho; Kwok Ho Ting; Leung Chun Wing
2014	China; Shi Tao; Yuan Zhong; Qin Chenlu; Shen Pingan	Hong Kong; Cheung King Wai; Cheung King Lok; Leung Chun Wing; Wu Lok Chun	South Korea; Jang Sun-jae; Park Keon-woo; Park Seon-ho; Cho Ho-sung
2015	China; Liu Hao; Shen Pingan; Qin Chenlu; Liu Wei	Japan; Ryo Chikatani; Kazushige Kuboki; Takuto Kurabayashi; Shogo Ichimaru	South Korea; Shin Don-gin; Park Keon-woo; Im Jae-yeon; Park Sang-hoon
2016	China; Liu Hao; Fan Yang; Qin Chenlu; Shen Pingan; Xue Chaohua	Japan; Kazushige Kuboki; Shogo Ichimaru; Ryo Chikatani; Hiroaki Harada	South Korea; Park Keon-woo; Kim Ok-cheol; Min Kyeong-ho; Shin Dong-in; Im Jae-yeon
2017	China; Yuan Zhong; Fan Yang; Qin Chenlu; Xue Saifei	South Korea; Min Kyeong-ho; Park Sang-hoon; Kim Ok-cheol; Im Jae-yeon	Japan; Takuto Kurabayashi; Ryo Chikatani; Minori Shimmura; Hiroaki Harada
2018	Japan; Ryo Chikatani; Shogo Ichimaru; Shunsuke Imamura; Keitaro Sawada	South Korea; Min Kyeong-ho; Im Jae-yeon; Kim Ok-cheol; Kang Tae-woo	China; Hou Yake; Xue Chaohua; Qin Chenlu; Shen Pingan
2019	South Korea; Im Jae-yeon; Kim Ok-cheol; Min Kyeong-ho; Shin Dong-in	Japan; Ryo Chikatani; Eiya Hashimoto; Shogo Ichimaru; Kazushige Kuboki	Kazakhstan; Robert Gaineyev; Roman Vassilenkov; Artyom Zakharov; Alisher Zhumakan
2020	Japan; Ryo Chikatani; Shunsuke Imamura; Kazushige Kuboki; Keitaro Sawada	South Korea; Park Sang-hoon; Shin Dong-in; Min Kyeong-ho; Im Jae-yeon	Hong Kong; Mow Ching Yin; Leung Ka Yu; Cheung King Lok; Leung Chun Wing
2022	Japan; Shoi Matsuda; Kazushige Kuboki; Shunsuke Imamura; Naoki Kojima; Eiya Hashimoto	South Korea; Park Sang-hoon; Min Kyeong-ho; Shin Dong-in; Jang Hun	India; Vishavjeet Singh; Dinesh Kumar; Venkappa Kengalgutti; Anantha Narayan; Naman Kapil
2023	Japan; Eiya Hashimoto; Naoki Kojima; Shunsuke Imamura; Kazushige Kuboki; Shoi Matsuda	China; Yang Yang; Sun Wentao; Zhang Haiao; Sun Haijiao	Kazakhstan; Artyom Zakharov; Dmitriy Noskov; Alisher Zhumakan; Ramis Dinmukhametov
2024	Japan; Kazushige Kuboki; Naoki Kojima; Shoi Matsuda; Eiya Hashimoto; Shunsuke Imamura	China; Yang Yang; Pei Zhengyu; Zhang Haiao; Zhang Jinyan; Li Boan	Kazakhstan; Alisher Zhumakan; Ramis Dinmukhametov; Ilya Karabutov; Dmitriy Noskov

=== Elimination race ===
Year	(gold) Gold Medal	(silver) Silver Medal	(bronze) Bronze Medal
1995	(South Korea) Cho Ho-sung	(Kazakhstan) Sergey Konnov	(Philippines) Norberto Oconer
2001	(South Korea) Cho Ho-sung	(Philippines) Paulo Manapul	(Iran) Amir Zargari
2002	(Iran) Amir Zargari	(Japan) Makoto Iijima	(Indonesia) Agus Yulianto
2003	(South Korea) Choi Soon-young	(Iran) Amir Zargari	(Kazakhstan) Alexey Kolessov
2004	(Iran) Amir Zargari	(Japan) Makoto Iijima	(Indonesia) Agus Yulianto
2005	(South Korea) Park Sung-baek	(Kazakhstan) Alexey Lyalko	(South Korea) Im Byung-hyun
2006–2022 Not Held
2023	(Japan) Eiya Hashimoto	(Kazakhstan) Ramis Dinmukhametov	(Hong Kong) Leung Chun Wing
2024	(Japan) Shunsuke Imamura	(Uzbekistan) Nikita Tsvetkov	(Kazakhstan) Ramis Dinmukhametov

== Women's track events ==
=== Sprint ===
Year	(gold) Gold Medal	(silver) Silver Medal	(bronze) Bronze Medal
1995	(China) Chang Yubin	(Japan) Seiko Hashimoto	(South Korea) Shim Eun-jung
1999	(China) Wang Yan	(China) Jiang Cuihua	(Japan) Kazuyo Murashita
2001	(Chinese Taipei) Lu Yi-wen	(South Korea) Lee Jong-ae	(South Korea) Ku Hyun-jin
2002	(China) Tian Fang	(Japan) Maya Tachikawa	(Chinese Taipei) Lu Yi-wen
2003	(China) Jiang Cuihua	(South Korea) Ahn Yun-hee	(Japan) Maya Tachikawa
2004	(China) Jiang Yonghua	(China) Tian Fang	(Japan) Maya Tachikawa
2005	(China) Zhang Lei	(China) Gao Yawei	(South Korea) Gu Hyon-jin
2006	(China) Gong Jinjie	(China) Li Na	(South Korea) You Jin-a
2007	(China) Guo Shuang	(China) Zheng Lulu	(Indonesia) Uyun Muzizah
2008	(China) Zheng Lulu	(China) Gong Jinjie	(Chinese Taipei) Huang Ting-ying
2009	(China) Zheng Lulu	(China) Gong Jinjie	(Malaysia) Fatehah Mustapa
2010	(China) Guo Shuang	(China) Gong Jinjie	(Hong Kong) Lee Wai Sze
2011	(China) Guo Shuang	(China) Lin Junhong	(Hong Kong) Lee Wai Sze
2012	(Hong Kong) Lee Wai Sze	(Malaysia) Fatehah Mustapa	(China) Shi Jingjing
2013	(Malaysia) Fatehah Mustapa	(China) Shi Jingjing	(China) Li Xuemei
2014	(China) Lin Junhong	(China) Zhong Tianshi	(Hong Kong) Lee Wai Sze
2015	(Hong Kong) Lee Wai Sze	(China) Lin Junhong	(Malaysia) Fatehah Mustapa
2016	(China) Lin Junhong	(South Korea) Lee Hye-jin	(Hong Kong) Lee Wai Sze
2017	(Hong Kong) Lee Wai Sze	(South Korea) Kim Won-gyeong	(South Korea) Lee Hye-jin
2018	(Hong Kong) Lee Wai Sze	(China) Zhong Tianshi	(South Korea) Lee Hye-jin
2019	(Hong Kong) Lee Wai Sze	(China) Zhong Tianshi	(South Korea) Lee Hye-jin
2020	(Hong Kong) Lee Wai Sze	(China) Zhong Tianshi	(China) Qi Lei
2022	(Japan) Riyu Ota	(Japan) Yuka Kobayashi	(South Korea) Cho Sun-young
2023	(Japan) Riyu Ota	(Japan) Mina Sato	(Japan) Fuko Umekawa
2024	(China) Wang Lijuan	(China) Tong Mengqi	(Malaysia) Nurul Izzah Izzati Mohd Asri

=== 500m time trial ===
Year	(gold) Gold Medal	(silver) Silver Medal	(bronze) Bronze Medal
1995	(China) Chang Yubin		
2001	(Chinese Taipei) Lu Yi-wen	(Japan) Maya Tachikawa	(South Korea) Ku Hyun-jin
2002	(China) Jiang Yonghua	(Japan) Maya Tachikawa	(Chinese Taipei) Lu Yi-wen
2003	(China) Jiang Cuihua	(Japan) Maya Tachikawa	(South Korea) Kim Yong-mi
2004	(China) Jiang Yonghua	(China) Tian Fang	(Japan) Maya Tachikawa
2006	(China) Gong Jinjie	(Chinese Taipei) Hsiao Mei-yu	(South Korea) You Jin-a
2007	(Chinese Taipei) Hsiao Mei-yu	(China) Guo Shuang	(Indonesia) Uyun Muzizah
2008	(China) Gong Jinjie	(Malaysia) Fatehah Mustapa	(Chinese Taipei) Huang Ting-ying
2009	(China) Gong Jinjie	(Hong Kong) Lee Wai Sze	(Malaysia) Fatehah Mustapa
2010	(China) Guo Shuang	(Hong Kong) Lee Wai Sze	(South Korea) Kim Won-gyeong
2011	(Hong Kong) Lee Wai Sze	(China) Guo Shuang	(Malaysia) Fatehah Mustapa
2012	(Hong Kong) Lee Wai Sze	(China) Xu Yulei	(Malaysia) Fatehah Mustapa
2013	(Hong Kong) Lee Wai Sze	(China) Shi Jingjing	(Malaysia) Fatehah Mustapa
2014	(Hong Kong) Lee Wai Sze	(South Korea) Lee Hye-jin	(Malaysia) Fatehah Mustapa
2015	(Hong Kong) Lee Wai Sze	(Malaysia) Fatehah Mustapa	(Japan) Kayono Maeda
2016	(China) Zhong Tianshi	(Hong Kong) Lee Wai Sze	(Chinese Taipei) Hsiao Mei-yu
2017	(Hong Kong) Lee Wai Sze	(South Korea) Cho Sun-young	(China) Li Xuemei
2018	(Hong Kong) Lee Wai Sze	(China) Song Chaorui	(Malaysia) Fatehah Mustapa
2019	(China) Lin Junhong	(South Korea) Kim Soo-hyun	(Indonesia) Crismonita Dwi Putri
2020	(China) Chen Feifei	(South Korea) Kim Soo-hyun	(Malaysia) Fatehah Mustapa
2022	(Malaysia) Nurul Izzah Izzati Mohd Asri	(South Korea) Kim Bo-mi	(India) Mayuri Lute
2023	(China) Jiang Yulu	(Malaysia) Nurul Izzah Izzati Mohd Asri	(Japan) Aki Sakai
2024	(Malaysia) Nurul Izzah Izzati Mohd Asri	(South Korea) Hwang Hyeon-seo	(China) Luo Shuyan

=== Keirin ===
Year	(gold) Gold Medal	(silver) Silver Medal	(bronze) Bronze Medal
2003	(China) Jiang Cuihua	(Japan) Maya Tachikawa	(South Korea) Lee Jong-ae
2004	(Japan) Maya Tachikawa	(China) Tian Fang	(South Korea) Ahn Yeon-hee
2006	(South Korea) You Jin-a	(China) Li Na	(Chinese Taipei) Hsiao Mei-yu
2007	(China) Zheng Lulu	(Japan) Sakie Tsukuda	(South Korea) Gu Sung-eun
2008	(China) Zheng Lulu	(Malaysia) Fatehah Mustapa	(Thailand) Jutatip Maneephan
2009	(China) Zheng Lulu	(Japan) Hiroko Ishii	(Thailand) Jutatip Maneephan
2011	(China) Guo Shuang	(South Korea) Park Eun-mi	(China) Gong Jinjie
2012	(Malaysia) Fatehah Mustapa	(China) Xu Yulei	(Hong Kong) Lee Wai Sze
2013	(Hong Kong) Lee Wai Sze	(Malaysia) Fatehah Mustapa	(China) Li Xuemei
2014	(Hong Kong) Lee Wai-sze	(South Korea) Kim Wong-yeong	(China) Zhong Tianshi
2015	(China) Lin Junhong	(South Korea) Lee Hye-jin	(Hong Kong) Lee Wai Sze
2016	(Hong Kong) Lee Wai Sze	(Malaysia) Fatehah Mustapa	(South Korea) Lee Hye-jin
2017	(Hong Kong) Lee Wai Sze	(South Korea) Lee Hye-jin	(Japan) Kayono Maeda
2018	(Hong Kong) Lee Wai Sze	(South Korea) Lee Hye-jin	(China) Zhong Tianshi
2019	(Japan) Yuka Kobayashi	(Hong Kong) Lee Wai Sze	(China) Zhong Tianshi
2020	(Hong Kong) Lee Wai Sze	(Japan) Yuka Kobayashi	(South Korea) Lee Hye-jin
2022	(Japan) Mina Sato	(South Korea) Park Ji-hae	(Malaysia) Nurul Izzah Izzati Mohd Asri
2023	(Japan) Mina Sato	(Japan) Fuko Umekawa	(Japan) Riyu Ota
2024	(Malaysia) Nurul Izzah Izzati Mohd Asri	(China) Tong Mengqi	(Malaysia) Anis Amira Rosidi

=== Individual pursuit ===
Year	(gold) Gold Medal	(silver) Silver Medal	(bronze) Bronze Medal
1995	(China) Ma Huizhen	(China) Wang Quingzhi	
1999	(China) Zhao Haijuan	(South Korea) Kim Yong-mi	(Japan) Kaori Iida
2001	(South Korea) Kim Yong-mi	(South Korea) Lim Hang-jun	(Indonesia) Nurhayati
2002	(China) Zhao Haijuan	(Indonesia) Uyun Muzizah	(Chinese Taipei) Lan Hsiao-yun
2003	(China) Li Meifang	(China) Zhang Junying	(South Korea) Lim Hyung-joon
2004	(China) Li Meifang	(South Korea) Lim Hyung-joon	(Chinese Taipei) Lan Hsiao-yun
2005	(China) Liu Yongli	(South Korea) Han Song-hee	(South Korea) Gu Sung-eun
2006	(South Korea) Lee Min-hye	(China) Wang Li	(China) Liu Yongli
2007	(South Korea) Lee Min-hye	(South Korea) Ha Seon-ha	(Japan) Satomi Wadami
2008	(China) Li Wei	(South Korea) Ha Seon-ha	(Malaysia) Leow Hoay Sim
2009	(China) Wu Chaomei	(Japan) Satomi Wadami	(Thailand) Chanpeng Nontasin
2010	(China) Jiang Fan	(South Korea) Na Ah-reum	(Thailand) Chanpeng Nontasin
2011	(South Korea) Lee Ju-mi	(Thailand) Chanpeng Nontasin	(China) Wu Chaomei
2012	(Japan) Maki Tabata	(Hong Kong) Jamie Wong	(Chinese Taipei) Huang Ho-hsun
2013	(South Korea) Kim You-ri	(Japan) Sakura Tsukagoshi	(China) Li Jiujin
2014	(China) Jing Yali	(Hong Kong) Pang Yao	(South Korea) Na Ah-reum
2015	(Chinese Taipei) Huang Ting-ying	(Hong Kong) Yang Qianyu	(Thailand) Supuksorn Nuntana
2016	(Chinese Taipei) Huang Ting-ying	(Hong Kong) Yang Qianyu	(South Korea) Son Eun-ju
2017	(South Korea) Lee Ju-mi	(Japan) Yumi Kajihara	(China) Huang Dongyan
2018	(South Korea) Lee Ju-mi	(Chinese Taipei) Huang Ting-ying	(China) Ma Menglu
2019	(South Korea) Lee Ju-mi	(Uzbekistan) Olga Zabelinskaya	(China) Wang Hong
2020	(South Korea) Lee Ju-mi	(Hong Kong) Leung Bo Yee	(Singapore) Luo Yiwei
2022	(South Korea) Lee Ju-mi	(Japan) Kie Furuyama	(Uzbekistan) Yanina Kuskova
2023	(China) Wei Suwan	(South Korea) Lee Ju-mi	(Japan) Maho Kakita
2024	(Japan) Maho Kakita	(China) Zhou Menghan	(Kazakhstan) Rinata Sultanova

=== Points race ===
Year	(gold) Gold Medal	(silver) Silver Medal	(bronze) Bronze Medal
1995	(China) Chang Yubin	(Indonesia) Nurhayati	(Chinese Taipei) Chang Hsu-ying
1999	(Japan) Kaori Iida	(Chinese Taipei) Fang Fen-fang	(South Korea) Kim Yong-mi
2001	(South Korea) Kim Yong-mi	(Indonesia) Nurhayati	(South Korea) Lim Mi-young
2002	(China) Yang Limei	(Chinese Taipei) Lan Hsiao-yun	(China) Zheng Puxiang
2003	(South Korea) Han Song-hee	(China) Ni Fenghan	(Japan) Ayumi Otsuka
2004	(Thailand) Chanpeng Nontasin	(China) Ni Fenghan	(Chinese Taipei) Lan Hsiao-yun
2005	(South Korea) Gu Sung-eun	(Japan) Mayuko Hagiwara	(Malaysia) Noor Azian Alias
2006	(China) Li Yan	(China) Wang Jianling	(Hong Kong) Jamie Wong
2007	(China) Li Yan	(Hong Kong) Jamie Wong	(Japan) Satomi Wadami
2008	(South Korea) Kim Eun-hee	(Thailand) Chanpeng Nontasin	(Japan) Li Wei
2009	(China) Meng Lang	(Thailand) Chanpeng Nontasin	(Japan) Hiroko Ishii
2010	(Japan) Mayuko Hagiwara	(Hong Kong) Jamie Wong	(China) Tang Kerong
2011	(South Korea) Na Ah-reum	(China) Wu Chaomei	(Hong Kong) Jamie Wong
2012	(Hong Kong) Jamie Wong	(Uzbekistan) Olga Drobysheva	(Japan) Maki Tabata
2013	(Hong Kong) Jamie Wong	(Japan) Minami Uwano	(Malaysia) Jupha Somnet
2014	(Japan) Kisato Nakamura	(Thailand) Chanpeng Nontasin	(Malaysia) Jupha Somnet
2015	(Chinese Taipei) Huang Ting-ying	(South Korea) Rhee Chae-kyung	(Japan) Sakura Tsukagoshi
2016	(Chinese Taipei) Huang Ting-ying	(Malaysia) Jupha Somnet	(Japan) Minami Uwano
2017	(Japan) Yumi Kajihara	(China) Huang Li	(South Korea) Kim You-ri
2018	(Malaysia) Jupha Somnet	(Hong Kong) Diao Xiaojuan	(Chinese Taipei) Zeng Ke-xin
2019	(Uzbekistan) Olga Zabelinskaya	(Chinese Taipei) Huang Ting-ying	(China) Zhang Ying
2020	(Uzbekistan) Olga Zabelinskaya	(South Korea) Na Ah-reum	(Hong Kong) Leung Bo Yee
2022	(Japan) Tsuyaka Uchino	(South Korea) Kang Hyun-kyung	(Uzbekistan) Yanina Kuskova
2023	(China) Liu Jiali	(Uzbekistan) Olga Zabelinskaya	(Japan) Mizuki Ikeda
2024	(Japan) Tsuyaka Uchino	(Uzbekistan) Margarita Misyurina	(Hong Kong) Leung Bo Yee

=== Scratch ===
Year	(gold) Gold Medal	(silver) Silver Medal	(bronze) Bronze Medal
2003	(Chinese Taipei) Lan Hsiao-yun	(China) Jiang Yanxia	(South Korea) Gu Sung-eun
2005	(South Korea) Kim Soo-hyun	(Chinese Taipei) Hsiao Mei-yu	(Malaysia) Noor Azian Alias
2007	(South Korea) Son Hee-jung	(South Korea) Gu Sung-eun	(Indonesia) Santia Tri Kusuma
2008	(South Korea) Park Eun-mi	(Indonesia) Santia Tri Kusuma	(China) Diao Xiao Juan
2009	(China) Meng Lang	(Hong Kong) Jamie Wong	(Thailand) Thatsani Wichana
2010	(Chinese Taipei) I Fang-ju	(South Korea) Lee Min-hye	(Hong Kong) Diao Xiao Juan
2011	(Chinese Taipei) Tseng Hsiao-chia	(Hong Kong) Jamie Wong	(Thailand) Jutatip Maneephan
2012	(Hong Kong) Diao Xiao Juan	(Thailand) Panwaraporn Boonsawat	(Japan) Maki Tabata
2013	(South Korea) Kim Eun-hee	(Chinese Taipei) Tseng Hsiao-chia	(China) Gong Xingyu
2014	(China) Huang Dongyan	(Hong Kong) Yang Qianyu	(Chinese Taipei) Tseng Hsiao Chia
2015	(Chinese Taipei) Huang Ting-ying	(Hong Kong) Pang Yao	(Japan) Yoko Kojima
2016	(Japan) Yumi Kajihara	(Chinese Taipei) Huang Ting-ying	(Malaysia) Jupha Somnet
2017	(China) Huang Li	(South Korea) Kang Hyun-kyung	(Hong Kong) Diao Xiaojuan
2018	(Chinese Taipei) Huang Ting-ying	(Hong Kong) Diao Xiaojuan	(China) Wang Xiaofei
2019	(Chinese Taipei) Huang Ting-ying	(China) Shen Shanrong	(Hong Kong) Pang Yao
2020	(Japan) Kie Furuyama	(Kazakhstan) Rinata Sultanova	(China) Shen Shanrong
2022	(South Korea) Kim You-ri	(Japan) Kie Furuyama	(India) Chayanika Gogoi
2023	(Japan) Yumi Kajihara	(China) Liu Jiali	(Hong Kong) Lee Sze Wing
2024	(China) Liu Jiali	(Hong Kong) Lee Sze Wing	(Japan) Mizuki Ikeda

=== Omnium ===
Year	(gold) Gold Medal	(silver) Silver Medal	(bronze) Bronze Medal
2009	(Indonesia) Santia Tri Kusuma	(Thailand) Sutharat Boonsawat	(Chinese Taipei) Hsiao Mei-yu
2010	(South Korea) Na Ah-reum	(Hong Kong) Diao Xiao Juan	(Chinese Taipei) Hsiao Mei-yu
2011	(South Korea) Lee Min-hye	(Thailand) Jutatip Maneephan	(Japan) Minami Uwano
2012	(China) Huang Li	(Chinese Taipei) Hsiao Mei-yu	(South Korea) Lee Min-hye
2013	(Chinese Taipei) Hsiao Mei-yu	(South Korea) Lee Min-hye	(Japan) Minami Uwano
2014	(China) Luo Xiaolong	(Chinese Taipei) Hsiao Mei-yu	(South Korea) Lee Min-hye
2015	(China) Luo Xiaolong	(Hong Kong) Diao Xiao Juan	(Chinese Taipei) Hsiao Mei-yu
2016	(China) Luo Xiaolong	(Chinese Taipei) Hsiao Mei-yu	(Japan) Sakura Tsukagoshi
2017	(Japan) Yumi Kajihara	(China) Luo Xiaoling	(Hong Kong) Meng Zhaojuan
2018	(Japan) Yumi Kajihara	(China) Wang Xiaofei	(Chinese Taipei) Huang Ting-ying
2019	(Japan) Yumi Kajihara	(Chinese Taipei) Huang Ting-ying	(Uzbekistan) Olga Zabelinskaya
2020	(Japan) Yumi Kajihara	(China) Wang Xiaofei	(Hong Kong) Lee Sze Wing
2022	(Japan) Tsuyaka Uchino	(Indonesia) Ayustina Delia Priatna	(Kazakhstan) Rinata Sultanova
2023	(Japan) Yumi Kajihara	(Hong Kong) Lee Sze Wing	(Chinese Taipei) Huang Ting-ying
2024	(Japan) Yumi Kajihara	(China) Liu Jiali	(Hong Kong) Lee Sze Wing

=== Madison ===
Year	(gold) Gold Medal	(silver) Silver Medal	(bronze) Bronze Medal
2017	Hong Kong; Pang Yao; Meng Zhaojuan	South Korea; Son Eun-ju; Kang Hyun-kyung	Japan; Kie Furuyama; Yumi Kajihara
2018	Japan; Kisato Nakamura; Yumi Kajihara	South Korea; Kim You-ri; Yu Seon-ha	China; Jin Chenhong; Liu Jiali
2019	Japan; Kie Furuyama; Yumi Kajihara	South Korea; Kim You-ri; Na Ah-reum	Uzbekistan; Ekaterina Knebeleva; Olga Zabelinskaya
2020	Hong Kong; Yang Qianyu; Pang Yao	China; Wang Xiaofei; Liu Jiali	South Korea; Yu Seon-ha; Na Ah-reum
2022	Japan; Kie Furuyama; Tsuyaka Uchino	South Korea; Kim You-ri; Na Ah-reum	Uzbekistan; Nafosat Kozieva; Yanina Kuskova
2023	Japan; Yumi Kajihara; Tsuyaka Uchino	South Korea; Lee Ju-mi; Na Ah-reum	Uzbekistan; Olga Zabelinskaya; Nafosat Kozieva
2024	Japan; Tsuyaka Uchino; Maho Kakita	Uzbekistan; Olga Zabelinskaya; Nafosat Kozieva	Hong Kong; Leung Wing Yee; Lee Sze Wing

=== Team sprint ===
Year	(gold) Gold Medal	(silver) Silver Medal	(bronze) Bronze Medal
2001	South Korea; Kim Yong-mi; Lee Jong-ae; Ku Hyun-jin	Chinese Taipei; Lu Yi-wen; Wu Fang-ju; Hsu Pei-wen	Indonesia; Nurhayati; Secelia Sucestoria; Santia Tri Kusuma
2003	Japan; Maya Tachikawa; Masumi Shinozaki; Tomoko Endo	China; Tian Fang; Ni Fenghan; Jiang Yanxia	South Korea; Kim Sun-hee; Ahn Yun-hee; Lee Jong-ae
2004	China	Japan; Maya Tachikawa; Tomoko Endo	Chinese Taipei
2005	China; Zhang Lei; Gao Yawei; Gong Jinjie	South Korea; Gu Hyon-jin; You Jin-a; Kim Soo-hyun	Chinese Taipei; Hsiao Mei-yu; Lan Hsiao-yun; Huang Ho-hsun
2006	China; Gong Jinjie; Wang Jianling	South Korea; Lee Min-hye; You Jin-a	Chinese Taipei; I Fang-ju; Tseng Hsiao-chia
2007	China; Guo Shuang; Zheng Lulu	Indonesia; Uyun Muzizah; Santia Tri Kusuma	Thailand; Jutatip Maneephan; Wathinee Luekajorh
2008	China; Zheng Lulu; Gong Jinjie	Chinese Taipei; Hsiao Mei-yu; Huang Ting-ying	South Korea; You Jin-a; Lee Eun-ji
2009	China; Zheng Lulu; Gong Jinjie	Chinese Taipei; Hsiao Mei-yu; Huang Ting-ying	Thailand; Jutatip Maneephan; Wathinee Luekajorh
2010	China; Gong Jinjie; Lin Junhong	Chinese Taipei; Hsiao Mei-yu; Huang Ting-ying	Hong Kong; Lee Wai Sze; Meng Zhao Juan
2011	China; Lin Junhong; Gong Jinjie	South Korea; Kim Won-Gyeong; Lee Eun-Ji	Hong Kong; Lee Wai Sze; Meng Zhao Juan
2012	China; Shi Jingjing; Xu Yulei	South Korea; Lee Eun-ji; Lee Hye-jin	Hong Kong; Diao Xiao Juan; Wang Xiao Fei
2013	China; Li Xuemei; Shi Jingjing	Japan; Kanako Kase; Ryoko Nakagawa	South Korea; Hong Hyeon-ji; Lee Hye-jin
2014	China; Lin Junhong; Zhong Tianshi	South Korea; Kim Wong-yeong; Lee Hye-jin	Japan; Kayono Maeda; Takako Ishii
2015	South Korea; Lee Hye-jin; Choi Seul-gi	Japan; Takako Ishii; Kayono Maeda	China; Li Xuemei; Shi Jingjing
2016	China; Gong Jinjie; Zhong Tianshi	South Korea; Lee Hye-jin; Cho Sun-young	Japan; Takako Ishii; Kayono Maeda
2017	South Korea; Kim Won-gyeong; Lee Hye-jin	Hong Kong; Lee Wai Sze; Ma Wing Yu	Japan; Kayono Maeda; Riyu Ota
2018	China; Zhong Tianshi; Song Chaorui	South Korea; Lee Hye-jin; Kim Won-gyeong	Japan; Kayono Maeda; Riyu Ota
2019	China; Lin Junhong; Zhong Tianshi	South Korea; Kim Soo-hyun; Lee Hye-jin	Hong Kong; Lee Wai Sze; Ma Wing Yu
2020	China; Zhuang Wei; Zhang Linyin	South Korea; Kim Soo-hyun; Lee Hye-jin	Malaysia; Fatehah Mustapa; Anis Amira Rosidi
2022	South Korea; Cho Sun-young; Park Ji-hae; Hwang Hyeon-seo	Japan; Riyu Ota; Yuka Kobayashi; Mina Sato	India; Triyasha Paul; Shushikala Agashe; Mayuri Lute
2023	China; Guo Yufang; Bao Shanju; Yuan Liying	Japan; Aki Sakai; Riyu Ota; Mina Sato; Fuko Umekawa	South Korea; Hwang Hyeon-seo; Lee Hye-jin; Cho Sun-young
2024	China; Zhou Fei; Tong Mengqi; Luo Shuyan; Wang Lijuan	Malaysia; Nurul Izzah Izzati Asri; Anis Amira Rosidi; Nurul Aliana Syafika Azizan	South Korea; Hwang Hyeon-seo; Kim Ha-eun; Cho Sun-young

=== Team pursuit ===
Year	(gold) Gold Medal	(silver) Silver Medal	(bronze) Bronze Medal
2001	Chinese Taipei; Chen Chiung-yi; Fang Fen-fang; Lan Hsiao-yun; Hwang He-xun	Indonesia; Nurhayati; Secelia Sucestoria; Santia Tri Kusuma; Nuraini	South Korea; Kim Yong-mi; Lim Hang-jun; Lim Mi-young; Ku Hyun-jin
2003	China; Li Meifang; Qian Yunjuan; Zhang Junying; Jiang Yanxia	South Korea; Gu Sung-eun; Han Song-hee; Choi Hye-kyeong; Lim Hyung-joon	None awarded
2005	South Korea; Kim Soo-hyun; You Jin-a; Gu Sung-eun; Han Song-hee	India; Rameshwori Devi; N. Chaoba Devi; V. Rejani; Kulwinder Kaur	Pakistan; Rahila Bano; Misbah Mushtaq Ali; Anila; Sidra Sadaf
2009	China; Meng Lang; Wu Chaomei; Tang Kerong	Thailand; Chanpeng Nontasin; Monrudee Chapookham; Wilaiwan Kunlapha	Indonesia; Haryati; Wahyuti Sri Rahayu; Fitriyani
2010	China; Jiang Fan; Jiang Wenwen; Liang Jing	South Korea; Lee Min-hye; Na Ah-reum; Son Eun-ju	Chinese Taipei; Hsiao Mei-yu; Huang Ho-hsun; Tseng Hsiao-chia
2011	China; Jiang Fan; Liang Jing; Jiang Wenwen	South Korea; Lee Min-hye; Na Ah-reum; Kim You-ri	Hong Kong; Meng Zhao Juan; Jamie Wong; Diao Xiao Juan
2012	China; Jiang Fan; Jiang Wenwen; Liang Jing	Japan; Kanako Kase; Maki Tabata; Minami Uwano	Chinese Taipei; Hsiao Mei-yu; Huang Ho-hsun; Tseng Hsiao-chia
2013	South Korea; Kim Eun-hee; Kim You-ri; Lee Min-hye; Son Hee-jung	Japan; Kanako Kase; Yoko Kojima; Sakura Tsukagoshi; Minami Uwano	China; Gong Xingyu; Li Jiujin; Sha Hui; Zhang Lei
2014	China; Jing Yali; Zhao Baofang; Huang Dongyan; Jiang Wenwen	South Korea; Na Ah-reum; Kim You-ri; Lee Min-hye; Lee Ju-mi	Hong Kong; Yang Qianyu; Pang Yao; Meng Zhao Juan; Jamie Wong
2015	China; Huang Dongyan; Zhao Baofang; Jing Yali; Jiang Wenwen	Hong Kong; Meng Zhao Juan; Leung Bo Yee; Yang Qianyu; Pang Yao	Japan; Kanako Kase; Sakura Tsukagoshi; Minami Uwano; Kisato Nakamura
2016	China; Huang Dongyan; Ma Menglu; Wang Hong; Chen Lulu	Japan; Sakura Tsukagoshi; Minami Uwano; Kisato Nakamura; Yumi Kajihara	South Korea; Kim You-ri; Son Eun-ju; Lee Joo-hee; Kang Hyun-kyung
2017	China; Huang Dongyan; Chen Qiaolin; Chen Siyu; Luo Xiaoling	Hong Kong; Yang Qianyu; Pang Yao; Leung Bo Yee; Diao Xiaojuan	South Korea; Lee Ju-mi; Son Eun-ju; Kang Hyun-kyung; Kim You-ri
2018	Japan; Yuya Hashimoto; Kie Furuyama; Yumi Kajihara; Kisato Nakamura	China; Wang Xiaofei; Liu Juali; Wang Hong; Ma Menglu	South Korea; Lee Ju-mi; Kim You-ri; Kim Hyun-ji; Yu Seon-ha
2019	South Korea; Kim You-ri; Jang Su-ji; Lee Ju-mi; Na Ah-reum	Japan; Kie Furuyama; Yumi Kajihara; Kisato Nakamura; Miho Yoshikawa	China; Liu Jiali; Wang Xiaofei; Wang Hong; Chen Qiaolin
2020	South Korea; Lee Ju-mi; Na Ah-reum; Kim Hyun-ji; Jang Su-ji	China; Wang Xiaofei; Liu Jiali; Cao Yuan; Huang Zhilin	Japan; Yumi Kajihara; Kie Furuyama; Kisato Nakamura; Nao Suzuki
2022	South Korea; Lee Ju-mi; Shin Ji-eun; Kim You-ri; Na Ah-reum; Kang Hyun-kyung	Kazakhstan; Marina Kuzmina; Svetlana Pachshenko; Rinata Sultanova; Anzhela Solovyeva; Faina Potapova	India; Swasti Singh; Chayanika Gogoi; Meenakshi Rohilla; Monika Jat; Rejiye Devi
2023	Japan; Yumi Kajihara; Mizuki Ikeda; Maho Kakita; Tsuyaka Uchino	China; Wang Susu; Zhang Hongjie; Wei Suwan; Wang Xiaoyue	South Korea; Shin Ji-eun; Lee Ju-mi; Na Ah-reum; Lee Eun-hee; Kang Hyun-kyung
2024	Japan; Tsuyaka Uchino; Maho Kakita; Mizuki Ikeda; Yumi Kajihara	China; Zhang Hongjie; Wang Susu; Wang Xiaoyue; Wei Suwan; Gong Xianbing	South Korea; Song Min-ji; Kim Min-jeong; Kang Hyun-kyung; Lee Eun-hee; Jang Su-ji

=== Elimination race ===
Year	(gold) Gold Medal	(silver) Silver Medal	(bronze) Bronze Medal
2001	(South Korea) Kim Yong-mi	(Chinese Taipei) Fang Fen-fang	(Indonesia) Nurhayati
2002	(Indonesia) Santia Tri Kusuma	(Indonesia) Uyun Muzizah	(China) Yu Hong
2003	(China) Wang Weiping	(South Korea) Gu Sung-eun	(South Korea) Han Song-hee
2004–2022 Not held
2023	(Japan) Tsuyaka Uchino	(Hong Kong) Yang Qianyu	(Chinese Taipei) Huang Ting-ying
2024	(Japan) Yumi Kajihara	(Hong Kong) Lee Sze Wing	(Chinese Taipei) Huang Ting-ying

== Notes ==
^1 Cancelled

^2 Men's event

^3 Women's event

^4 This event is held in late 2019 due to 2020 Summer Olympic track cycling's qualification timeline
