= 2003 Asian Cycling Championships =

- Venue: Changwon, South Korea
- Date: 4–13 August 2003
- Velodrome: Changwon Velodrome

The 2003 Asian Cycling Championships took place at Changwon, South Korea from 4 to 13 August 2003.

== Medal summary ==
=== Road ===
==== Men ====
Event	Gold	Silver	Bronze
Individual road race	Shinri Suzuki; Japan	Hidenori Nodera; Japan	Hassan Maleki; Iran
Individual time trial	Hossein Askari; Iran	Mai Công Hiếu; Vietnam	Kazuya Okazaki; Japan

==== Women ====
Event	Gold	Silver	Bronze
Individual road race	Jiang Yanxia; China	Zhang Junying; China	Choi Hye-kyeong; South Korea
Individual time trial	Li Meifang; China	Han Song-hee; South Korea	Ayumu Otsuka; Japan

=== Track ===
==== Men ====
Event	Gold	Silver	Bronze
Sprint	Kim Chi-bum; South Korea	Yuichiro Maesori; Japan	Hiroyuki Inagaki; Japan
1 km time trial	Masaki Inoue; Japan	Guo Jianbin; China	Liu Chin-feng; Chinese Taipei
Keirin	Keiichiro Yaguchi; Japan	Shinichi Ota; Japan	Kim Chi-bum; South Korea
Individual pursuit	Alireza Haghi; Iran	Jang Sun-jae; South Korea	Vladimir Bushanskiy; Kazakhstan
Points race	Song Kyung-bang; South Korea	Mehdi Sohrabi; Iran	Taiji Nishitani; Japan
Scratch	Song Kyung-bang; South Korea	Mehdi Sohrabi; Iran	Alireza Haghi; Iran
Elimination	Choi Soon-young; South Korea	Amir Zargari; Iran	Alexey Kolessov; Kazakhstan
Madison	Kazakhstan; Yuriy Yuda; Vladimir Bushanskiy	South Korea; Kwak Hoon-sin; Suh Seok-kyu	Iran; Amir Zargari; Abbas Saeidi Tanha
Team sprint	Japan; Masaki Inoue; Yuichiro Maesori; Hiroyuki Inagaki	South Korea	Chinese Taipei
Team pursuit	South Korea; Song Kyung-bang; Choi Soon-young; Jang Sun-jae; Kwak Hoon-sin	Iran; Alireza Haghi; Mehdi Sohrabi; Abbas Saeidi Tanha; Amir Zargari; Hossein Askari	Japan; Takashi Sasaki; Kei Uchida; Taiji Nishitani; Yusuke Kuroki

==== Women ====
Event	Gold	Silver	Bronze
Sprint	Jiang Cuihua; China	Ahn Yun-hee; South Korea	Maya Tachikawa; Japan
500 m time trial	Jiang Cuihua; China	Maya Tachikawa; Japan	Kim Sun-yi; South Korea
Keirin	Jiang Cuihua; China	Maya Tachikawa; Japan	Lee Jong-ae; South Korea
Individual pursuit	Li Meifang; China	Zhang Junying; China	Lim Hyung-joon; South Korea
Points race	Han Song-hee; South Korea	Ni Fenghan; China	Ayumu Otsuka; Japan
Scratch	Lan Hsiao-yun; Chinese Taipei	Jiang Yanxia; China	Gu Sung-eun; South Korea
Elimination	Wang Weiping; China	Gu Sung-eun; South Korea	Han Song-hee; South Korea
Team sprint	Japan; Maya Tachikawa; Masumi Shinozaki; Tomoko Endo	China; Tian Fang; Ni Fenghan; Jiang Yanxia	South Korea; Kim Sun-hee; Ahn Yun-hee; Lee Jong-ae
Team pursuit	China; Li Meifang; Qian Yunjuan; Zhang Junying; Jiang Yanxia	South Korea; Gu Sung-eun; Han Song-hee; Choi Hye-kyeong; Lim Hyung-joon	None awarded

== Medal table ==
Rank	Nation	Gold	Silver	Bronze	Total
1	China	8	6	0	14
2	South Korea	6	7	8	21
3	Japan	5	5	7	17
4	Iran	2	4	3	9
5	Chinese Taipei	1	0	2	3
5	Kazakhstan	1	0	2	3
7	Vietnam	0	1	0	1
Totals (7 entries)		23	23	22	68
