= 2005 Asian Cycling Championships =

- Venue: Ludhiana, India
- Date: 11–18 December 2005
- Velodrome: Punjab Agricultural University's Velodrome

The 2005 Asian Cycling Championships took place at the Punjab Agricultural University's Velodrome, Ludhiana, India from 11 to 18 December 2005.

== Medal summary ==
=== Road ===
==== Men ====
Event	Gold	Silver	Bronze
Individual road race	Joo Hyun-wook; South Korea	Omar Hasanin; Syria	Dmitriy Gruzdev; Kazakhstan
Individual time trial	Youm Jung-hwan; South Korea	Hossein Askari; Iran	Vladimir Tuychiev; Uzbekistan

==== Women ====
Event	Gold	Silver	Bronze
Individual road race	You Jin-a; South Korea	Ni Fenghan; China	Uyun Muzizah; Indonesia
Individual time trial	Li Meifang; China	Han Song-hee; South Korea	Huang Ho-hsun; Chinese Taipei

=== Track ===
==== Men ====
Event	Gold	Silver	Bronze
Sprint	Tsubasa Kitatsuru; Japan	Zhang Lei; China	Gao Yahui; China
Keirin	Cho Ho-sung; South Korea	Tsubasa Kitatsuru; Japan	Zhang Lei; China
Individual pursuit	Jang Sun-jae; South Korea	Alexey Lyalko; Kazakhstan	Joo Hyun-wook; South Korea
Points race	Alexey Lyalko; Kazakhstan	Youm Jung-hwan; South Korea	Makoto Iijima; Japan
Scratch	You Tae-bok; South Korea	Kazuhiro Mori; Japan	Alexey Zaitsev; Kazakhstan
Elimination	Park Sung-baek; South Korea	Alexey Lyalko; Kazakhstan	Im Byung-hyun; South Korea
Team sprint	China; Zhang Lei; Feng Yong; Gao Yahui	South Korea; Jeon Yeong-gyu; Kim Chi-bum; Cho Ho-sung	Malaysia; Junaidi Nasir; Mohd Rizal Tisin; Mohd Hafiz Sufian
Team pursuit	South Korea; Jang Sun-jae; Park Sung-baek; Cho Hyun-ok; Youm Jung-hwan	Iran; Mehdi Sohrabi; Amir Zargari; Hossein Askari; Alireza Haghi	Japan; Tadashi Iijima; Makoto Iijima; Taiji Nishitani; Kazuhiro Mori

==== Women ====
Event	Gold	Silver	Bronze
Sprint	Zhang Lei; China	Gao Yawei; China	Gu Hyon-jin; South Korea
Individual pursuit	Liu Yongli; China	Han Song-hee; South Korea	Gu Sung-eun; South Korea
Points race	Gu Sung-eun; South Korea	Mayuko Hagiwara; Japan	Noor Azian Alias; Malaysia
Scratch	Kim Soo-hyun; South Korea	Hsiao Mei-yu; Chinese Taipei	Noor Azian Alias; Malaysia
Team sprint	China; Zhang Lei; Gao Yawei; Gong Jinjie	South Korea; Gu Hyon-jin; You Jin-a; Kim Soo-hyun	Chinese Taipei; Hsiao Mei-yu; Lan Hsiao-yun; Huang Ho-hsun
Team pursuit	South Korea; Kim Soo-hyun; You Jin-a; Gu Sung-eun; Han Song-hee	India; Rameshwori Devi; N. Chaoba Devi; V. Rejani; Kulwinder Kaur	None awarded

== Medal table ==
Rank	Nation	Gold	Silver	Bronze	Total
1	South Korea	11	5	4	20
2	China	5	3	2	10
3	Japan	1	3	2	6
4	Kazakhstan	1	2	2	5
5	Iran	0	2	0	2
6	Chinese Taipei	0	1	2	3
7	India	0	1	0	1
7	Syria	0	1	0	1
9	Malaysia	0	0	3	3
10	Indonesia	0	0	1	1
10	Uzbekistan	0	0	1	1
Totals (11 entries)		18	18	17	53
