= Narihiro =

- Gender: Male

Origin
- Origin: Japanese
- Meaning: Different meanings depending on the kanji used

Narihiro (written: 成浩 or 斉裕) is a masculine Japanese given name. Notable people with the name include:

- Hachisuka Narihiro (蜂須賀 斉裕; 1821–1868), Japanese daimyō
- Narihiro Inamura (稲村 成浩; born 1971), Japanese cyclist
