= Satomi Wadami =

Japanese road and track cyclist

Personal information
- Full name: Satomi Wadami
- Born: 26 May 1987 (age 39) Hokuei, Tottori, Japan
- Height: 1.67 m (5 ft 5 1/2 in)
- Weight: 64 kg (141 lb)

Cycling career
- Sport: Cycling
- Disciplines: Road, track
- Role: Rider
Medal record
Representing Japan
Asian Championships
Women's road cycling
Bronze medal – third place	2006 Kuala Lumpur	Time trial
Women's track cycling
Bronze medal – third place	2007 Bangkok	Points race
Bronze medal – third place	2007 Bangkok	Pursuit

Satomi Wadami (和田見 里美, Wadami Satomi; born May 26, 1987 in Hokuei, Tottori) is a Japanese amateur road and track cyclist. She won three bronze medals in women's road time trial, individual pursuit, and points race at the Asian Championships (2006 and 2007), and later represented Japan at the 2008 Summer Olympics.

Wadami qualified for the Japanese squad in the women's points race at the 2008 Summer Olympics in Beijing by claiming a gold medal and receiving a berth from the UCI "B" World Championships in Cape Town, South Africa. Wadami did not finish the grueling 25-km Olympic sprint race in a field of twenty-two cyclists, after she suddenly crashed and fell off the track, leaving her distraught and injured.

== Career highlights ==
2006
(gold) Asian Championships (ITT), Kuala Lumpur (MAS)
2nd Overall, Tour de Okinawa, Japan
3rd Japanese Championships (Road), Japan
2007
(gold) UCI B World Championships (Points race), Cape Town (RSA)
(gold) UCI B World Championships (Scratch), Cape Town (RSA)
(silver) UCI B World Championships (Pursuit), Cape Town (RSA)
(bronze) UCI B World Championships (Keirin), Cape Town (RSA)
(bronze) Asian Championships (Points race), Bangkok (THA)
(bronze) Asian Championships (Pursuit), Bangkok (THA)
