= Kang Hyun-kyung =

South Korean cyclist

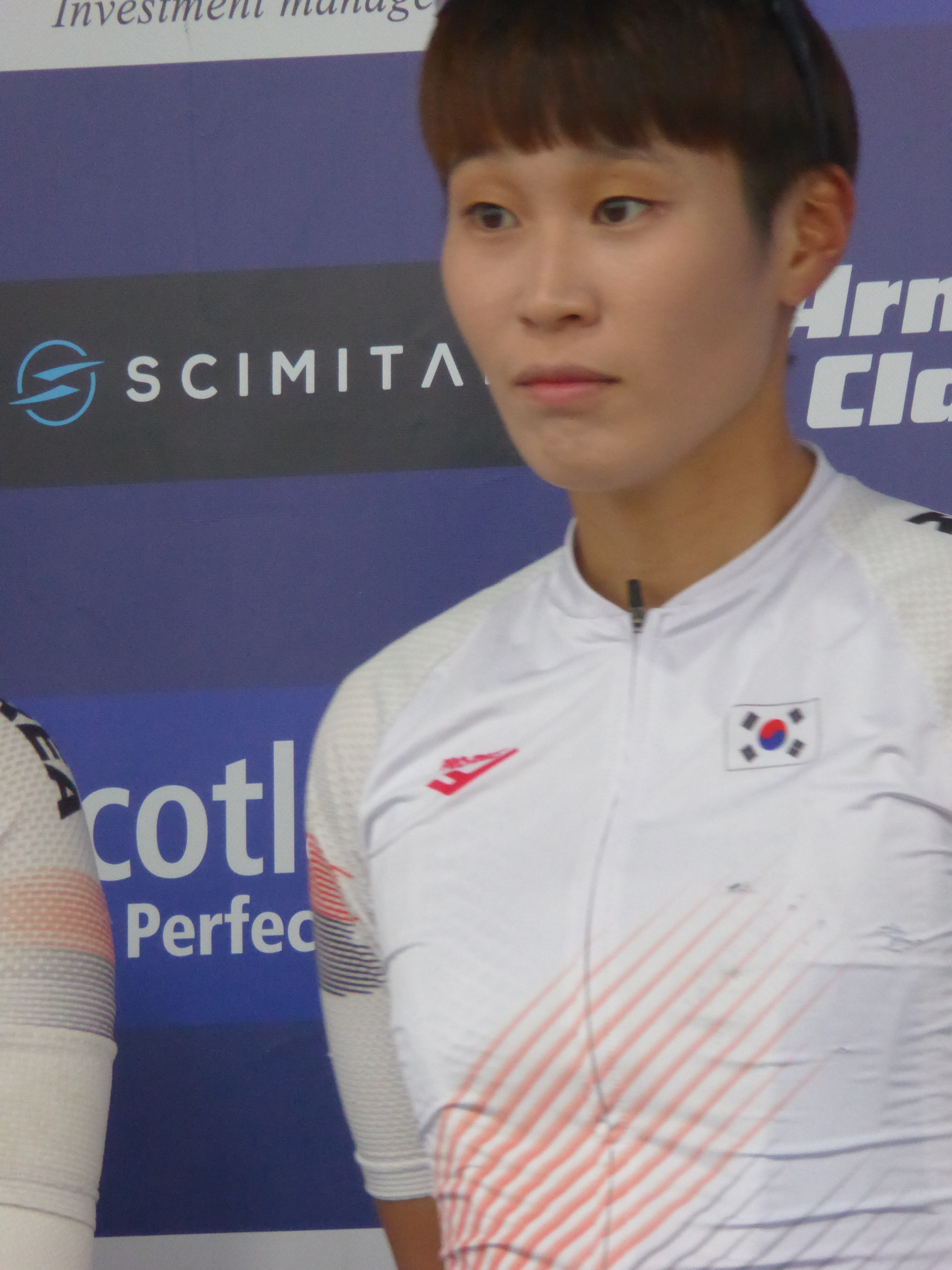
- Kang at the 2019 Women's Tour of Scotland

Personal information
- Born: 6 January 1995 (age 31)

Cycling career
- Sport: Cycling
- Disciplines: Track; Road
- Role: Rider
Medal record
Representing South Korea
Women's track cycling
Asian Championships
Gold medal – first place	2022 New Delhi	Team pursuit
Silver medal – second place	2022 New Delhi	Points race
Bronze medal – third place	2016 Izu	Team pursuit
Bronze medal – third place	2023 Nilai	Team pursuit
Bronze medal – third place	2024 New Delhi	Team pursuit

Kang Hyun-kyung (born 6 January 1995) is a South Korean track and road cyclist. During her career, Kang has won five medals at the Asian Cycling Championships – one gold, one silver and three bronze.
