= Hu Ke =

Hu Ke is the name of:

- Hu Ke (actress) (born 1975), Chinese actress
- Hu Ke (cyclist) (born 1988), Chinese male track cyclist
