= Gu Sung-eun =

South Korean cyclist

Personal information
- Full name: Gu Sung-eun
- Born: 19 August 1984 (age 42) South Korea
- Height: 1.66 m (5 ft 5 in)
- Weight: 55 kg (121 lb)

Cycling career
- Sport: Cycling
- Disciplines: Road; Track
- Role: Rider

Professional team
- 2013: Orica–AIS
Medal record
Representing South Korea
Women's track cycling
UCI Junior World Championships
Silver medal – second place	2002 Melbourne	Points race
Silver medal – second place	2002 Melbourne	Scratch
Asian Cycling Championships
Gold medal – first place	2005 Ludhiana	Points race
Gold medal – first place	2005 Ludhiana	Team pursuit
Silver medal – second place	2003 Changwon	Elimination race
Silver medal – second place	2003 Changwon	Team pursuit
Silver medal – second place	2007 Bangkok	Scratch
Bronze medal – third place	2003 Changwon	Scratch
Bronze medal – third place	2005 Ludhiana	Individual pursuit
Bronze medal – third place	2007 Bangkok	Keirin
Women's road bicycle racing
UCI B World Championships
Silver medal – second place	2007 Cape Town	Individual time trial
Bronze medal – third place	2007 Cape Town	Road race
Asian Cycling Championships
Silver medal – second place	2011 Nakhon Ratchasima	Road race
Silver medal – second place	2012 Kuala Lumpur	Road race
Bronze medal – third place	2007 Bangkok	Road race
Bronze medal – third place	2014 Astana	Road race
Universiade
Gold medal – first place	2011 Shenzhen	Road race

Gu Sung-eun (born 19 August 1984) is a South Korean professional racing cyclist.

== Career ==
Having finished third in the road race in the 2007 UCI B World Championships and second in the time trial, Gu qualified to represent her country at the 2008 Summer Olympics in Beijing. Gu crashed in the road race when she lost control of her bike on the wet roads, bringing others down with her. She eventually found herself falling into a concrete ditch on the side of the highway but got back on her bike to finish 59th.

== Major results ==
2002
UCI Junior Track Cycling World Championships

2nd Points race
2nd Scratch

2003
Asian Track Championships

2nd Elimination race
2nd Team pursuit
3rd Scratch

2004
2nd Scratch, UCI Track Cycling World Cup Classics, Sydney
2005
Asian Track Championships

1st Points race
1st Team pursuit
3rd Individual pursuit

2007
UCI B World Championships

2nd Time trial
3rd Road race

Asian Track Championships

2nd Scratch
3rd Keirin

3rd Road race, Asian Road Championships
2011
1st Road race, Summer Universiade
2nd Road race, Asian Road Championships
2012
2nd Road race, Asian Road Championships
9th Overall Tour of Thailand
2014
3rd Road race, Asian Road Championships
2015
1st Road race, National Road Championships
2020
2nd Madison, National Track Championships (with Kim Hyun-ji)
