= Hiroaki Harada =

Japanese bicycle racer (born 1993)

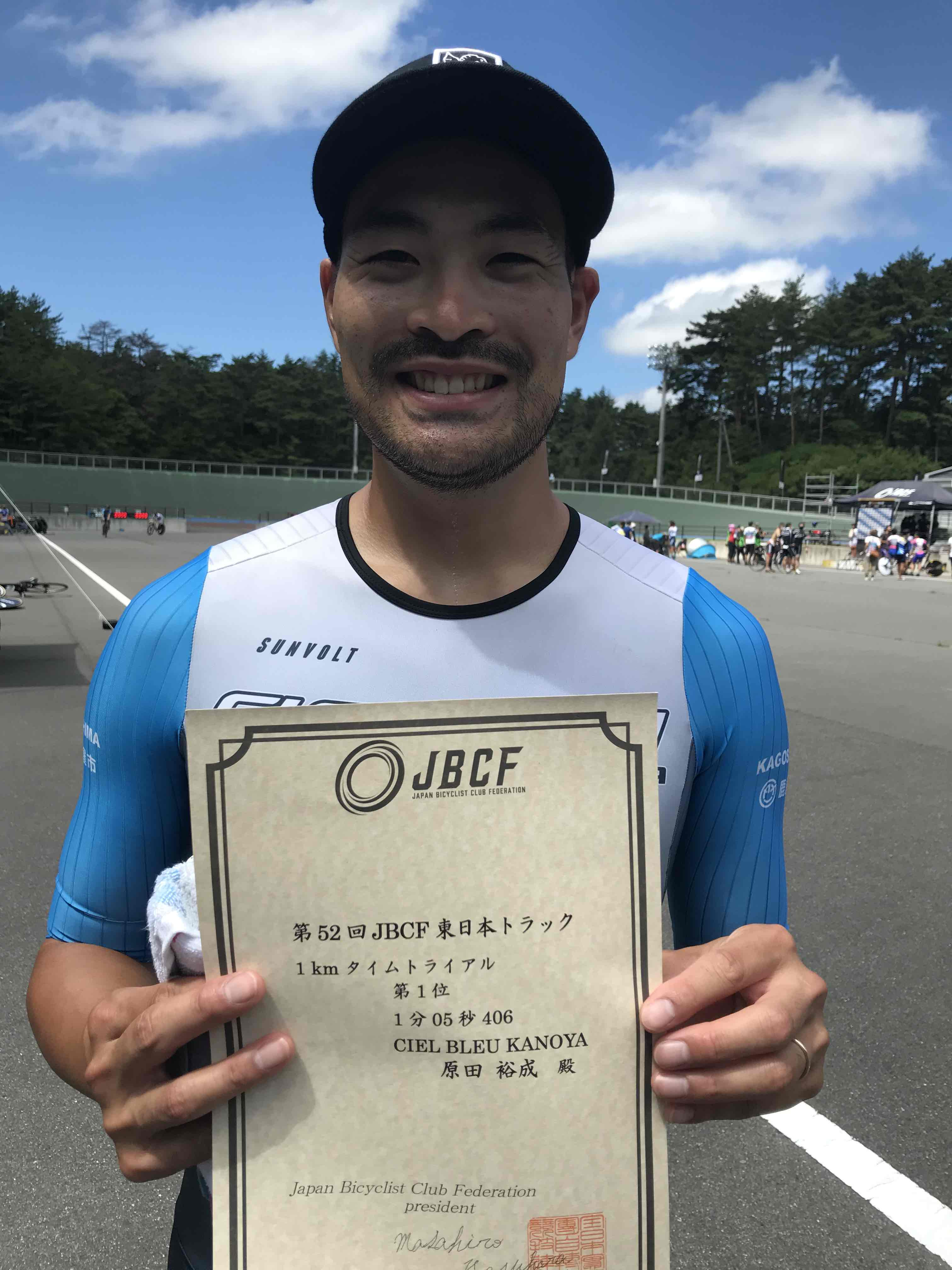

Personal information
- Full name: Hiroaki Harada; Japanese: 原田 裕成
- Born: 11 August 1993 (age 33)

Cycling career
- Sport: Cycling
- Current team: Ciel Bleu Kanoya
- Disciplines: Track; Road
- Role: Rider

Professional teams
- 2016–2017: Aisan Racing Team
- 2018: Team Bridgestone Cycling
- 2020: Victoire Hiroshima
- 2020–2023: Ciel Bleu Kanoya
- 2025: Sparkle Oita Racing Team
Medal record
Representing Japan
Men's track cycling
Asian Championships
Silver medal – second place	2016 Izu	Team pursuit
Bronze medal – third place	2017 New Delhi	Team pursuit

Hiroaki Harada (原田 裕成, Harada Hiroaki; born 11 August 1993) is a Japanese track and road cyclist, who currently rides for UCI Continental Team Sparkle Oita Racing Team.

He joined the Aisan Racing Team for the 2016 season. He won the silver medal in the team pursuit at the 2016 Asian Cycling Championships.

== Major results ==
2014
National Track Championships

1st Scratch
1st Madison (with Eiya Hashimoto)

2016
2nd Team pursuit, Asian Track Championships
2017
3rd Team pursuit, Asian Track Championships
2018
1st Team pursuit, National Track Championships
2019
1st Points race, National Track Championships
2021
1st Team pursuit, National Track Championships
