= Li Xuemei (cyclist) =

Chinese track cyclist

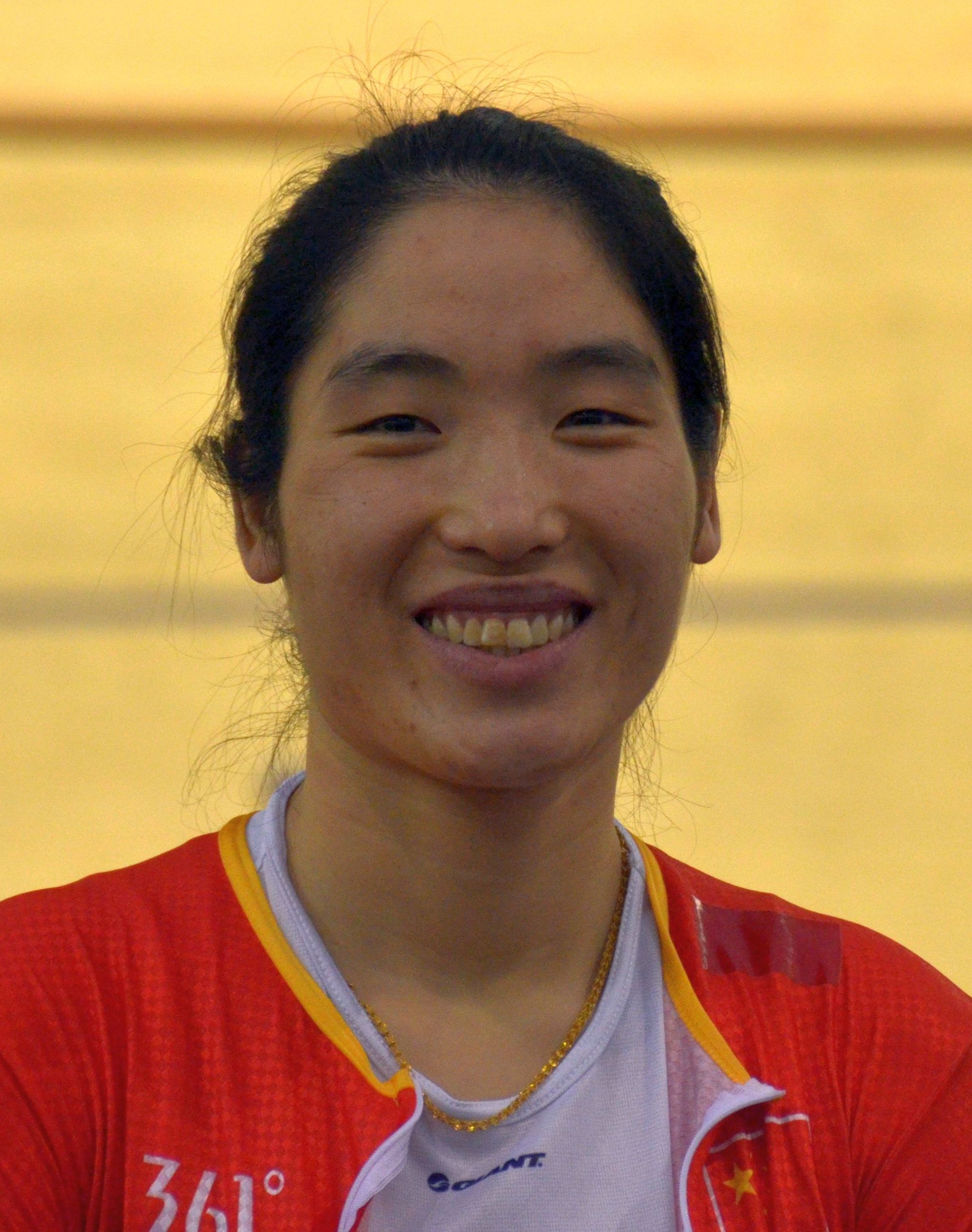

Personal information
- Born: 16 November 1988 (age 37) Xianghe County, Hebei

Cycling career
- Sport: Cycling
- Current team: People's Republic of China
- Discipline: Track
- Role: Rider
- Rider type: Sprinter
Medal record
Representing China
Women's track cycling
Asian Championships
Bronze medal – third place	2017 New Delhi	500m time trial
Bronze medal – third place	2015 Ratchasima	Team sprint
Gold medal – first place	2013 New Delhi	Team sprint
Gold medal – first place	2012 Kuala Lumpur	Team sprint

Li Xuemei (Chinese: 李雪妹) is a Chinese professional track cyclist.

== Career ==
Li first represented Hebei province at the National Games of China in the 100m hurdles. She later represented Hebei in cycling. She made news for completing the 500m cycling sprint in 33.898 seconds during the 2009 National Games of China, defeating Chinese olympians Guo Shuang and Jiang Cuihua.

=== Injury ===
During training for the National Games of China in 2012, Li fractured her clavicle.

== Career results ==
2012
1st Team Sprint, Asian Track Championships
2013
1st Team Sprint, Asian Track Championships
2015
3rd Team Sprint, Asian Track Championships (with Shi Jingjing)
2017
3rd 500m Time Trial, Asian Track Championships

== National competitions ==
Year	Competition	Venue	Position	Notes
2009	National Games of China	Shandong, China	1st	500m cycling sprint
2013	National Games of China	Shenyang, China	2nd	Keirin
2014	National Track Cycling Championship of China	Shenyang, China	2nd	Keirin
