= Nuraini =

Family name

Nuraini is an Indonesian feminine given name and surname, derived from Arabic nūr ʿaynī (نور عيني) meaning "light of my eye".

People named Nuraini include:

== Mononym ==
- Nuraini, Indonesian civil servant
- Nuraini, political candidate (DPR 2004 district: Jambi)
- Nuraini (b. 1963, Gorontalo), Indonesian politician
- Nuraini (b. 1973, Jakarta), Indonesian politician
- Nuraini (b. 1974, Palembang), Indonesian politician
- Nuraini (b. 1986, Jakarta), Indonesian politician
- Nuraini (b. 1989, Sampang), Indonesian politician
- Nuraini, also known as Dra. Nuraini M.A., civil servant for the Supreme Court of Indonesia
- Nuraini S.Pd.I (b. 1959, Jakarta), Indonesian politician

== Surname ==
- Arida Nuraini Primastiwi, Indonesian actress
- Arum Nuraini (b. 1969), Indonesian politician
- Ella Nuraini (b. 1995, Lamongan), Indonesian politician
- Eni Nuraini, Indonesian political candidate
- Fatimah Nuraini, Indonesian political candidate
- Henny Nuraini (b. 1968, Sukabumi), Indonesian politician
- Ichi Nuraini, Indonesian actress
- Intan Nuraini (actor), Indonesian actor and singer
- Intan Nuraini (football player), Indonesian association football player
- Ni Luh Sakinah Nuraini, assistant expert at State University of Malang
- Nina Nuraini, Indonesian political candidate
- Nuning Nuraini, Head lecturer (Industrial Mathematics and Finance) at the Bandung Institute of Technology
- Nunuk Nuraini (1961–2021), Indonesian food scientist
- Sarifah Nuraini, Indonesian political candidate
- Siti Nuraini, Indonesian writer
- Siti Nuraini, Indonesian politician born in Sigli
- Syf Nuraini (b. 1966, Kota Pontianak), Indonesian politician
- Tuti Nuraini, researcher

== Given name ==
- Nuraini Abdul Aziz, researcher
- Nuraini Bachrudin, Indonesian political candidate
- Inayati Nuraini Dwiputri, lecturer at State University of Malang
- Nani Nuraini Muksin, Indonesian political candidate
- Nuraini Besrari Jebbo, Indonesian political candidate
- Nuraini Rais Kahar, Indonesian political candidate
- Cahya Nuraini Lubis (b. 1958, Bogor), Indonesian politician
- Nuraini Nazeha, researcher
- Elda Nuraini Parwitasari, Indonesian political candidate
- Mariam Nuraini Solisa (b. 1980, Waegernangan), Indonesian politician
- Nuraini Tasrifanti (b. 1981, Grobogan), Indonesian politician

== See also ==
- Rumah Sakit Umum Nuraini, general hospital in North Sumatra
- Naraini, town in Uttar Pradesh, India
- Nurani, neighborhood in Palakkad, Kerala, India
