= Nurani =

- Neighborhood
- Location in Kerala, India Nurani (India)
- Coordinates: 10.76°N 76.64°E
- Country: India
- State: Kerala
- District: Palakkad

Government
  - Body: Palakkad Municipality

Languages
  - Official: Malayalam, English
- Time zone: UTC+5:30 (IST)
- PIN: 678004
- Telephone code: 0491
- Vehicle registration: KL-09

Nurani is a major commercial and residential area in Palakkad city Kerala, India. It is located along Palakkad Ponnani Road which connects further to NH 66. Nurani is ward 39 of Palakkad Municipality. It also contains a heritage village populated mainly by Tamil Brahmins.

== Temple history ==
The Brahmins engaged the Adhivasis, who were inhabitants of a nearby colony, for cultivation. Once when the Adhivasis were working to clear bushes in a hillock, they heard the sound of bells and experienced a fragrance and strange phenomena. On hearing this, the Brahmins ordered further excavation and found three cylindrical Vigrahas, a small granite elephant another flat vigraha buried under the hillock. On conducting Ashtamangalya Deva Prasna (traditional practice followed in Kerala temples) by eminent Astrologer and Pandits, it was found that the cylindrical Vigrahas are of Hariharaputhra (Ayyappa), Poorna and Pushkala (the two consorts of Hariharaputhra.) The flat idol was identified as Bhagavathy (Malikapurathamma). The Deva prasna also threw light on the origin of these idols. There was a Nampoodhiripad who used to regularly visit Aryankavu for darsan of Lord Ayyappa. Later in his life owing to old age, he could not visit Aryankavu which saddened him . As per the advice of Ayyappa (who came in his dream), he built a temple in his courtyard, installed the above idols seated on the elephant, worshipped them and got solace. After the death of this Namboodhiripad, when war broke out, his family abandoned their residence and fled the place for fear of an attack. In course of time the place was covered by hillock and bamboo bushes and the temple got buried under it.

The final result of the Dev Prasna was that the idols be installed in a suitable temple and daily poojas be conducted as prescribed by Agama Sashtras for the prosperity of villagers.

On hearing this, the Brahmins rejoiced and built the temple at the North Western end, facing the entrance of the village and installed the three cylindrical Vigrahas with the granite elephant. Later, for the prosperity and well being of the community, Shree Bhoomi Samedha Sree Vararaja Perual (Maha Vishnu) was installed on the Northern side of Hariharaputhra Sannidhi and facing the entrance to the village. Slowly idols of Ganesha were installed as prescribed by the Sastras. For the well being of all, a Thulasi Madam surrounded by Naga (snakes) idols and an Anjaneya Sannidhi behind, were erected to the North of Maha Vishnu Sannidhi. A Bhajan Madam was erected in front of the temple for propitiating Bhakthi, where regular Bhajans are held. In the place from where these idols were recovered in Kaikuthu Paramba, a Bhagavathy statue was installed, named Elaya Bhagavathy. The Bhagavathy is representative of all pervading force in the Universe. This is the background in which the Dharmasastha temple came about in the village. The concept of Dharmasastha temple is, even today, always connected to the Bhagavathy temple nearby. For the safety and protection of the southern part, a Siva Temple with Parvathy, Ganesa and other upadevathas was constructed, facing east, at the southern end of the village. The Nurani Agraharam (village) prospered and grew in size and a new extension sprung up on the south of the village, accommodating the increased population. As Siva Dhrishti (sight of Siva) is said to be Ugra (harsh), to protect the residents of the street facing the Siva temple, a Bala Ganapathy Temple was erected directly facing the Siva Temple. Daily Thrikala Poojas are being conducted in all the temples, as prescribed by Agama Sastras.

From the time the Dharmasastha temple came about, Thulasiamman Pooja and Sasthapreethi celebrations are going on every year in the months of December/January. The functions and poojas etc. spread over a period of 40 days, during the Mandalam period in each year. There are Vedic recitations, both in the morning and the evening on all these days, called Vaaram, by more than twenty learned Vedic scholars, reciting together in rhythm and grandeur. This is apart from Rudhrabhishekams, laksharchanas, Bhagavathy Seva, and many other Vedic rituals. On Wednesdays and Saturdays there are special songs on Dharmasastha sung in traditional way by the people of the village in front of the sanctum. These songs were created by the village elders together and have special meanings and characteristics unique in style and presentation in different ragaas. They are in Tamil. Even the young children of the community pick up this culture and sing the songs. The whole programmes culminate with Thulasiamman pooja and Sasthapreethi on a Friday and Saturday. These functions are unique and special to the people . There are many other programmes of art and culture by inviting musicians and Upanayasas on these occasions for performing in front of the temple. On the concluding day, the functions are interconnected with the functions in the Elaya Bhagavathi temple. The traditions are kept up even today and have their own unique flavour.

== Graamam ==
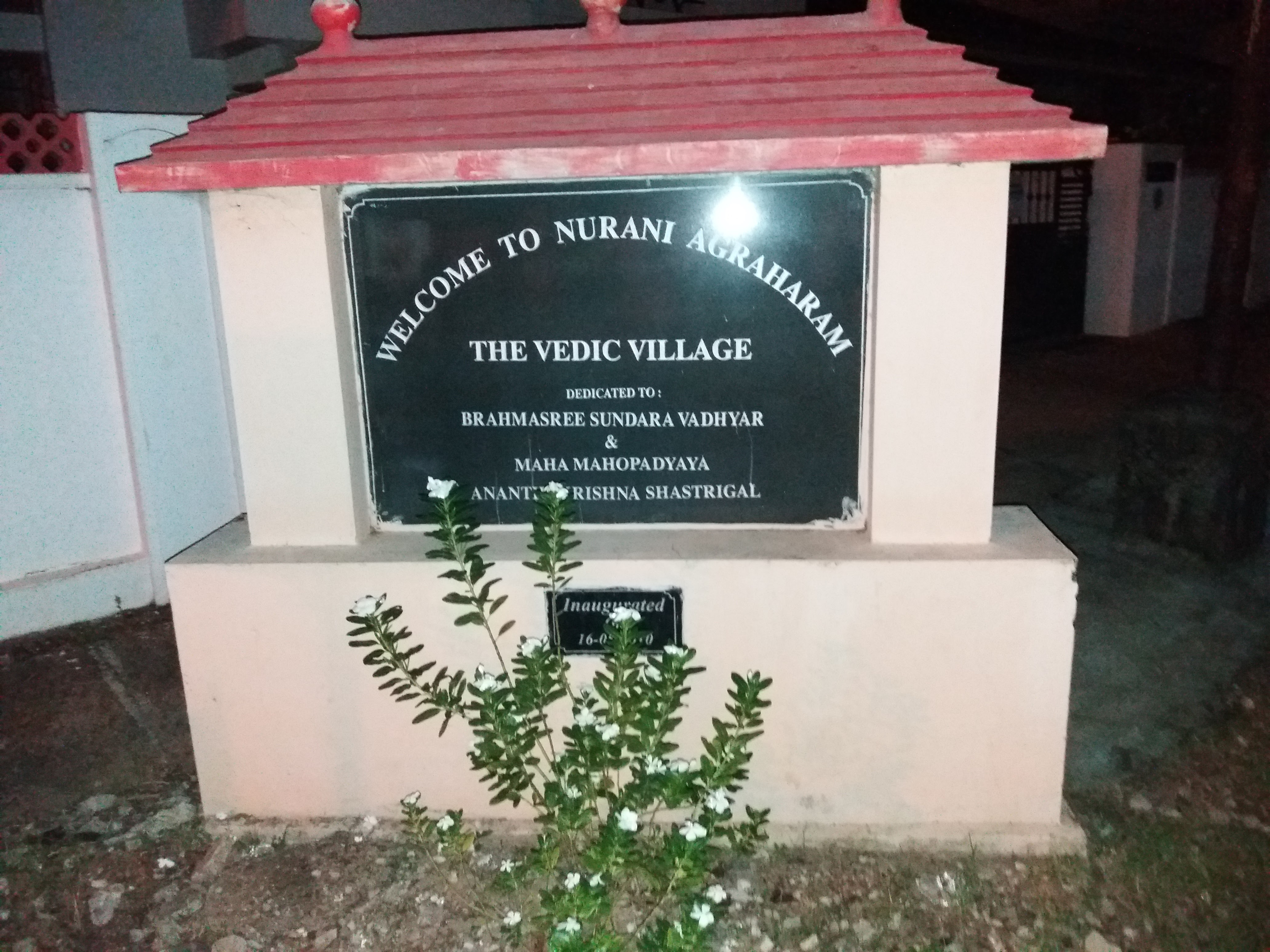
Nurani - The Vedic Village

Nurani is famous for its culture and religious fervour. About five centuries ago, Brahmins – mostly scholars, pandits, vaidikas, priests and cooks – from Thiruvannamalai in North Arcot district and other parts of Tamil Nadu came to Nurani in search of new pastures and established their dwelling in the present Agraharam (village). They brought in their Tamil culture and over years, became part and parcel of Palakkad population and their identity got merged in the new culture. Their Tamil accent and cultural milieu, in the present generation of people, can be seen distinctly different from that of the people of Tamil Nadu.

These Brahmins were held in high esteem for their expertise in Sastras, Puranas and Vedas. Many ventured on commerce, trade and agriculture and prospered. They became property owners and great businessmen. There is also a saying that Noorunnies (hundreds of Namboodhiri boys) were brought up in the mana (house of a Namboodhiri) nearby and hence the village got the name Nurani (a derivation from Noorunni).Nurani graamam (another name for agraharam or village) consists of several theruvus (or streets). Pudu theruvu (New street), Ottra theruvu (Single street), Retta theruvu (Double street), Ranganathapuram(Neyyandi), Varadharajapuram(Yekkandi), Paadathu theruvu, Sivan Kovil theruvu, Panchagramam are the main inroads. Sathapankthipuram is an extension at the corner of Retta theruvu and Panchagramam and goes towards Maithry Nagar. Oor Kovil (Vishnu temple) at the corner of Pudu theruvu and Retta theruvu, Sivan Kovil and Ganapathiyan Kovil are the main temples. The first two temples have a kulam or pond next to them. Nurani Grama Samudayam (NGS) is the community body that takes care of many development initiatives and festivals. Sarada Sankara Kalyana Mandapam (SSKM), next to Ganapathiyan Kovil is a common venue of many functions. Thankam food products is a popular brand store from Nurani. Thondikulam (also another graamam), Aishwarya Nagar, Vennakkara, Hira Nagar, Puduppalli Theruvu are some of the areas surrounding Nurani graamam.

== Festivals ==
The town is known for celebrating Sasthapreethi, a festival devoted to the Hindu deity Ayyappan. Nowadays, Sastha Preethi is celebrated all over India in various names such as Ayyappan Villakku, Ayyappan Pattu, Sastha Pattu etc. Sastha having earned a name of Annadhana Prabhu, mass feasts are arranged for the function every year. It is believed that Nurani, the famous agraharam in Palakkad Town in Kerala is the origin of Sastha cult. All over Kerala for Sasthapreethi festivals "Nurani Chellapillai song" is common. The festival consists of various traditions and rituals, along with hosting prominent musicians and instrumentalists (especially practitioners of the Panchavadyam art form). It is also known for its use of elephants. Shasthapreethi is a multi-day festival that includes Thulasiamman poojai. They also celebrate Theru or Ratholsavam, which is the temple car festival of Oor Kovil and Sivan Kovil. Once in 12 years, Nurani also celebrates Kumbhabhishekham in a grand manner, in which the temples also get a complete makeover.
