= Norberto Oconer =

Filipino cyclist

Personal information
- Born: May 10, 1965 (age 61)
- Height: 150 cm (4 ft 11 in)
- Weight: 55 kg (121 lb)

Cycling career
- Sport: Cycling

Norberto Oconer (born May 10, 1965) is a Filipino former cyclist. He competed at the 1988 Summer Olympics, and the 1992 Summer Olympics.
