= Choi Seung-woo =

South Korean cyclist (born 1989)

- Hangul: 최승우
- RR: Choe Seungu
- MR: Ch'oe Sŭngu

Choi Seung-woo (born 19 December 1989, Ansan) is a South Korean track cyclist. At the 2012 Summer Olympics, he competed in the Men's team pursuit for the national team.
