= Yoko Kojima =

Japanese cyclist

Cycling career
- Sport: Cycling
- Role: Rider

Yoko Kojima (小島 蓉子, Kojima Yōko) is a Japanese professional racing cyclist. She rode at the 2015 UCI Track Cycling World Championships.

== Major results ==
2014
3rd Omnium, Track Clubs ACC Cup
2015
3rd Scratch Race, Asian Track Championships
