= Shi Jingjing =

Chinese cyclist

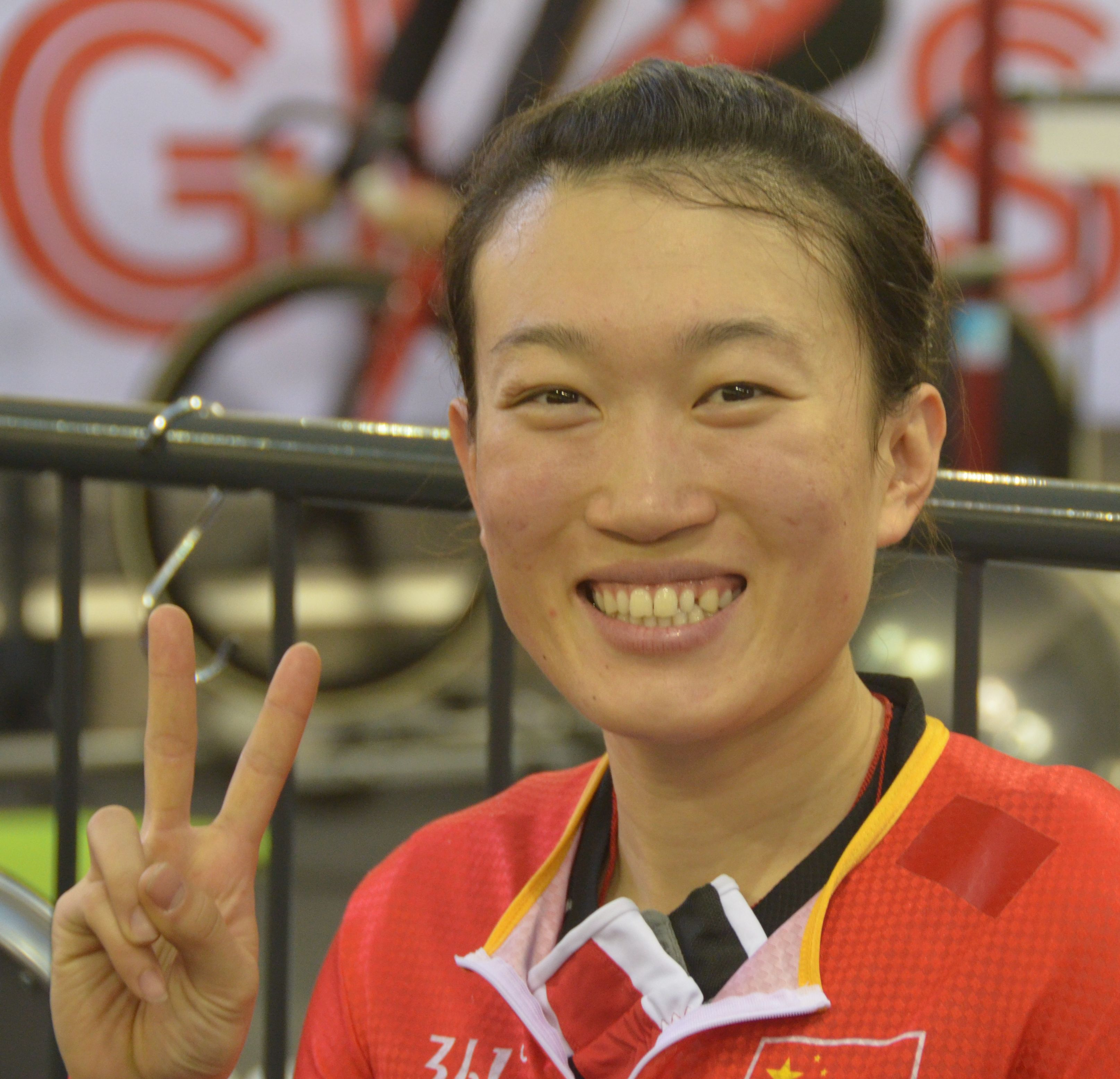
- Shi Jingjing, she a Chinese track cyclist.

Personal information
- Born: 29 October 1988 (age 37)

Cycling career
- Sport: Cycling
- Discipline: Track cycling
- Role: Rider
- Rider type: 500 m time trial

Shi Jingjing (born 29 October 1988) is a Chinese female track cyclist. She competed in the 500 m time trial event at the 2014 UCI Track Cycling World Championships.

== Major results ==
2014
3rd Sprint, Hong Kong International Track Cup
2015
3rd Team Sprint, Asian Track Championships (with Li Xuemei)
