= Changwon Velodrome =

Cycling venue in Changwon, South Korea

- Changwon Family Dome
- Interactive map of Changwon Velodrome
- Location: Changwon, Gyeongsangnam-do, South Korea
- Coordinates: 35°13′55″N 128°40′5″E
- Owner: Korea Cycle Racing Association
- Capacity: 14,000

Construction
- Opened: 2000

Changwon Velodrome is a velodrome in Changwon, South Korea. It opened in 2000, and has a seating capacity of 14,000 spectators. The venue hosted the 2002 Asian Games and 2003 Asian Cycling Championships.

== See also ==
- List of cycling tracks and velodromes
