= Wong Kin Chung =

Hong Kong diver

Personal information
- Nationality: Hong Konger
- Born: 11 June 1965 (age 59)

Sport
- Sport: Diving

Wong Kin Chung (born 11 June 1965) is a Hong Kong diver. He competed in the men's 3 metre springboard event at the 1988 Summer Olympics.
