= Kim Sun-hee =

South Korean government official (born 1969)

- 김선희

3rd Deputy Director of National Intelligence Service
- Incumbent
- Assumed office 5 August 2020
- President: Moon Jae-in
- Minister: Park Jie-won
- Preceded by: Kim Joon-hwan

Personal details
- Born: 1969 (age 56–57) Daegu, South Korea
- Education: Kyungpook National University; Korea University

Kim Sun-hee (Korean: 김선희; born 1969) is a South Korean government official currently serving as the 3rd Deputy Director of National Intelligence Service (NIS) - the first woman to lead the agency since in its near 60 years of history.

In detail Kim is the first woman to become its deputy head and to assume a vice-ministerial post in the NIS. Her promotion represents structural reforms the agency took under new Director Park Jie-won where its 3rd Deputy deals with science information and cyber security whilst its 1st deputy manages threats from North Korea and overseas and its 2nd deputy international terrorism and industrial espionage.

In May 2022 Kim represented her agency at the flag raising ceremony celebrating Korea becoming newest member of NATO's CCDCOE.

Before promoted to its deputy, Kim was the head of its information education centre. Previously, Kim led its internal affairs bureau and cyber policy division. Kim first joined the agency through the state exam.

Kim holds two degrees - a bachelor in German language and literature from Kyungpook National University and a master's in international relations from Korea University.
