= Alexey Kolessov =

Kazakhstani cyclist (born 1984)

Personal information
- Full name: Alexey Kolessov
- Born: September 27, 1984 (age 42) Uralsk, Soviet Union
- Height: 1.84 m (6 ft 0 in)
- Weight: 75 kg (165 lb)

Cycling career
- Sport: Cycling
- Current team: Retired
- Discipline: Road
- Role: Rider

Professional teams
- 2005: Capec
- 2007: Astana
- 2008: Ulan
- 2008: Centri della Calzatura–Partizan

Alexey Kolessov (Алексей Анатольевич Колесов, born September 27, 1984) is a Kazakhstani former professional road bicycle racer. He competed in the men's points race at the 2004 Summer Olympics.

== Major results ==
2003
5th Road race, National Road Championships
2004
1st Overall Tour of Azerbaijan

1st Stage 5

8th Overall Tour of Turkey
2005
4th Time trial, National Road Championships
2006
6th Boucle de l'Artois
10th Paris–Roubaix Espoirs
2010
4th Time trial, National Road Championships
