= Narihiro Inamura =

Japanese cyclist (born 1971)

Personal information
- Born: 18 December 1971 (age 54) Maebashi, Japan

Cycling career
- Sport: Cycling

Narihiro Inamura (稲村 成浩, Inamura Narihiro; born 18 December 1971) is a Japanese cyclist. He competed in two events at the 2000 Summer Olympics.
