= Zhang Junying =

Chinese cyclist

Junying Zhang
Personal information
- Born: 27 August 1977 (age 49) Luohe, Henan, China

Cycling career
- Sport: Cycling
- Discipline: Road cycling

Junying Zhang Chinese: 张俊英, born 27 May 1976) is a road cyclist from China. She represented her nation at the 2004 Summer Olympics. She won at the 2004 Asian Cycling Championships the women's road race. She also rode at the 2003 UCI Road World Championships.
