= Qian Yunjuan =

Chinese cyclist

Personal information
- Born: 11 March 1977 China
- Died: 7 August 2025 (aged 48) Chongqing, China
- Height: 1.66 m (5 ft 5 in)
- Weight: 68 kg (150 lb)

Cycling career
- Sport: Cycling
- Discipline: Road cycling

Qian Yunjuan (Chinese: 钱云娟, born 11 March 1977) was a road cyclist from China. She represented her nation at the 2004 Summer Olympics in the women's road race. She also rode at the 2003 UCI Road World Championships. She died on 7 August 2025 of lung cancer.
