= Liu Yongli =

Chinese cyclist

Personal information
- Born: 28 June 1980 (age 46) China

Cycling career
- Sport: Cycling
- Discipline: Road cycling

Professional team
- 2008: Giant Pro Cycling

Liu Yongli (Chinese: 刘永莉, born 28 June 1980) is a road cyclist from China. She represented her nation at the 2006 and 2007 UCI Road World Championships.
