= Han Song-hee =

South Korean cyclist (born 1983)

Han Songhee
Personal information
- Born: 8 May 1983 (age 43) South Korea

Cycling career
- Sport: Cycling
- Disciplines: Road cycling, Track cycling

Han Song-hee (Korean: 한성희; born 8 May 1983) is a track and road cyclist from South Korea. She represented her nation at the 2004 Summer Olympics in the women's road race.
