= Cycling at the 2026 Asian Games =

- Venue: Izu Velodrome (track); Shinshiro Cycling Road Course (road); Obata Ryokuchi Urban Forest (mountain biking); Nagoya Velodrome BMX Race Course (BMX racing); Aichi International Exhibition Center Hall C (BMX freestyle)
- Location: Nagoya and Tokoname, Aichi Prefecture; Izu, Shizuoka Prefecture, Japan
- Dates: 20 September–2 October 2026
- Competitors: 268 from 25 nations

Cycling at the 2026 Asian Games is being held between 20 September and 2 October 2026.

== Schedule ==
The schedule is as follows:

Q	Qualification	F	Finals

BMX, mountain biking and road cycling
Event↓/Date →	20; Sun	21; Mon	22; Tue	23; Wed	24; Thu	25; Fri	26; Sat	27; Sun	28; Mon	
BMX
Men's freestyle							Q	F		
Men's racing									Q	F
Women's freestyle							Q	F		
Women's racing									Q	F
Mountain biking
Men's cross-country						F				
Women's cross-country					F					
Road cycling
Men's road race				F						
Men's individual time trial	F									
Women's road race			F							
Women's individual time trial	F									

Q	Qualification	E	Elimination rounds	F	Finals

Track cycling
Event↓/Date →	29; Tue			30; Wed		1 Thu				2 Fri			
Men's sprint				Q	E	E		F					
Men's team sprint	Q	E	F										
Men's keirin										E		F	
Men's team pursuit	Q	E		F									
Men's omnium						SR	TR	ER	F				
Men's madison										F			
Women's sprint						Q		E		E		F	
Women's team sprint	Q	E	F										
Women's keirin				E	F								
Women's team pursuit	Q	E		F									
Women's omnium										SR	TR	ER	F
Women's madison						F							

1=SR = Scratch race, TR = Tempo race, ER = Elimination race, PR = Points race

== Medal summary ==
* Host nation (Japan)

Rank	Nation	Gold	Silver	Bronze	Total
1	China	10	7	7	24
2	Japan*	8	9	1	18
3	Kazakhstan	3	2	0	5
4	Malaysia	1	1	2	4
5	Hong Kong	0	2	3	5
6	Afghanistan	0	1	0	1
7	Indonesia	0	0	3	3
7	South Korea	0	0	3	3
9	Chinese Taipei	0	0	1	1
9	Mongolia	0	0	1	1
9	Uzbekistan	0	0	1	1
Totals (11 entries)		22	22	22	66

=== Medalists ===
==== BMX ====
Event	Gold	Silver	Bronze
Men's freestyle	Rim Nakamura; Japan	Kaede Ozawa; Japan	Sha Xiaolong; China
Men's racing	Asuma Nakai; Japan	Hyoga Kiuchi; Japan	Lin Haochao; China
Women's freestyle	Sun Sibei; China	Miharu Ozawa; Japan	Sun Jiaqi; China
Women's racing	Sae Hatakeyama; Japan	Liao Wanyi; China	Jasmine Azzahra; Indonesia

==== Mountain biking ====
Event	Gold	Silver	Bronze
Men's cross-country	Yuan Jinwei; China	Tatsuumi Soejima; Japan	Feri Yudoyono; Indonesia
Women's cross-country	Wu Zhifan; China	Liang Zhenglan; China	Sayu Bella Sukma Dewi; Indonesia

==== Road cycling ====
Event	Gold	Silver	Bronze
Men's road race	Alexey Lutsenko; Kazakhstan	Yevgeniy Fedorov; Kazakhstan	Yuhi Todome; Japan
Men's individual time trial	Alexey Lutsenko; Kazakhstan	Shunsuke Imamura; Japan	Sainbayaryn Jambaljamts; Mongolia
Women's road race	Guo Li; China	Fariba Hashimi; Afghanistan	Leung Wing Yee; Hong Kong
Women's individual time trial	Rinata Sultanova; Kazakhstan	Zhang Hao; China	Shin Ji-eun; South Korea

==== Track cycling ====
===== Men's events =====
Event	Gold	Silver	Bronze
Sprint	Kaiya Ota; Japan	Li Zhiwei; China	Azizulhasni Awang; Malaysia
Team sprint	China; Jin Zhiheng; Li Zhiwei; Liu Qi; Xie Han	Japan; Yoshitaku Nagasako; Kaiya Ota; Minato Nakaishi; Kanata Takahashi	Hong Kong; Mok Tsz Chun; To Cheuk Hei; Yung Tsun Ho
Keirin	Azizulhasni Awang; Malaysia	Li Zhiwei; China	Xie Han; China
Madison	Japan; Naoki Kojima; Kazushige Kuboki	China; Wu Junjie; Sun Haijiao	Uzbekistan; Sergey Rostovtsev; Nikita Tsvetkov
Omnium	Kanta Umezawa; Japan	Chu Tsun Wai; Hong Kong	Wu Junjie; China
Team pursuit	China; Pei Zhengyu; Sun Wentao; Wu Junjie; Yang Yang; Sun Haijiao	Japan; Naoki Kojima; Kazushige Kuboki; Shoi Matsuda; Kanta Umezawa; Shoki Kawano	South Korea; Hong Seung-min; Kim Hyeon-seok; Min Kyeong-ho; Park Sang-hoon; Lee Jin-gu

===== Women's events =====
Event	Gold	Silver	Bronze
Sprint	Yuan Liying; China	Mina Sato; Japan	Jiang Yulu; China
Team sprint	China; Luo Xuehuang; Yuan Liying; Jiang Yulu; Wang Lijuan	Malaysia; Nurul Aliana Syafika Azizan; Nurul Izzah Izzati Mohd Asri; Anis Amira Rosidi; Nur Alyssa Mohd Farid	Chinese Taipei; Wang Sin-ting; Chen Ching-yun; Liu Shang-ying
Keirin	Yuan Liying; China	Wang Lijuan; China	Nurul Izzah Izzati Mohd Asri; Malaysia
Madison	Japan; Maho Kakita; Tsuyaka Uchino	Hong Kong; Lee Sze Wing; Leung Wing Yee	China; Chen Ning; Gong Xianbing
Omnium	Yumi Kajihara; Japan	Rinata Sultanova; Kazakhstan	Lee Sze Wing; Hong Kong
Team pursuit	China; Chen Ning; Gong Xianbing; Wang Xiaoyue; Wei Suwan; Yuan Haidi	Japan; Mizuki Ikeda; Yumi Kajihara; Maho Kakita; Tsuyaka Uchino; Misaki Okamoto	South Korea; Jang Su-ji; Kim Min-jeong; Noh Yun-seo; Shin Ji-eun; Park Do-young

== Participating nations ==
- Afghanistan (3)
- Bahrain (2)
- Bangladesh (2)
- China (37)
- Chinese Taipei (14)
- Hong Kong (5)
- India (14)
- Indonesia (20)
- Iran (2)
- Japan (37) (host)
- Jordan (1)
- Kazakhstan (18)
- Macau (5)
- Malaysia (11)
- Mongolia (5)
- Nepal (2)
- Philippines (4)
- Qatar (5)
- Singapore (2)
- South Korea (31)
- Syria (3)
- Thailand (24)
- United Arab Emirates (6)
- Uzbekistan (9)
- Vietnam (6)
