= List of Chinese records in track cycling =

The following are the national records in track cycling in China maintained by China's national cycling federation: Chinese Cycling Association.

== Men ==
Event	Record	Athlete	Date	Meet	Place	Ref
Flying 200 m time trial	9.435	Li Zhiwei	29 March 2026	Asian Championships	Tagaytay, Philippines	
250 m time trial (standing start)	17.202	Jin Zhiheng	29 September 2026	Asian Games	Izu, Japan	
500 m time trial	32.187	Liu Qi	19 October 2019	Asian Championships	Jincheon, South Korea	
Team sprint (750 m)	42.152	Jin Zhiheng; Li Zhiwei; Liu Qi	29 September 2026	Asian Games	Izu, Japan	
1 km time trial	59.901	Liu Qi	24 February 2025	Asian Championships	Nilai, Malaysia	
4000m individual pursuit	4:07.136	Pei Zhengyu	30 March 2026	Asian Championships	Tagaytay, Philippines	
4000m team pursuit	3:47.621	Sun Wentao; Yang Yang; Wu Junjie; Pei Zhengyu	30 September 2026	Asian Games	Izu, Japan	

== Women ==
Event	Record	Athlete	Date	Meet	Place	Ref
Flying 200 m time trial	9.976	Yuan Liying	15 March 2025	Nations Cup	Konya, Turkey	
250 m time trial (standing start)	18.282	Gong Jinjie	12 August 2016	Olympic Games	Rio de Janeiro, Brazil	
500 m time trial	32.957	Guo Yufang	9 July 2022	Nations Cup	Cali, Colombia	
1 km time trial	1:02.857	Yuan Liying	26 July 2026	Chinese Championships	Zigong, China	
Team sprint (500 m)	31.804	Bao Shanju; Zhong Tianshi	2 August 2021	Olympic Games	Izu, Japan	
Team sprint (750 m)	45.370	Luo Xuehuang; Yuan Liying; Jiang Yulu	29 September 2026	Asian Games	Izu, Japan	
3000m individual pursuit	3:32.823	Wei Suwan	16 June 2023	Asian Championships	Nilai, Malaysia	
4000m individual pursuit	4:32.318	Wei Suwan	28 March 2026	Asian Championships	Tagaytay, Philippines	
3000m team pursuit	3:23.083	Jiang Fan; Jiang Wenwen; Liang Jing	5 April 2012	World Championships	Melbourne, Australia	
4000m team pursuit	4:08.818	Gong Xianbing; Chen Ning; Wang Xiaoyue; Wei Suwan	30 September 2026	Asian Games	Izu, Japan	
