= List of Thai records in track cycling =

The following are the national records in track cycling in Thailand, maintained by its national cycling federation, Thai Cycling Association.

== Men ==
Event	Record	Athlete	Date	Meet	Place	Ref
Flying 200 m time trial	9.666	Jai Angsuthasawait	30 September 2026	Asian Games	Izu, Japan	
250m time trial (standing start)	18.771	Wachirawit Saenkhamwong	26 September 2023	Asian Games	Chun'an, China	
500 m time trial	33.244	Wachirawit Saenkhamwong	11 January 2019	Asian Championships	Jakarta, Indonesia	
1 km time trial	1:02.083	Norasetthada Bunma	31 March 2026	Asian Championships	Tagaytay, Philippines	
Team sprint	45.735	Pongthep Tapimay; Satjaku Sianglam; Worayut Kapunya	27 August 2017	Southeast Asian Games	Nilai, Malaysia	
4000 m individual pursuit	4:38.862	Nattakrit Kaeonoi	23 February 2025	Asian Championships	Nilai, Malaysia	
4000 m team pursuit	4:16.481	Turakit Boonratanathanakorn; Wachirawit Saenkhamwong; Peerapong Ladngern; Patompob Phonarjthan	9 January 2019	Asian Championships	Jakarta, Indonesia	
Hour record						

== Women ==
Event	Record	Athlete	Date	Meet	Place	Ref
Flying 200 m time trial	11.538	Yaowaret Jitmat	15 June 2023	Asian Championships	Nilai, Malaysia	
250 m time trial (standing start)	20.717	Natthaporn Aphimot	26 September 2023	Asian Games	Chun'an, China	
500 m time trial	36.457	Yaowaret Jitmat	19 June 2023	Asian Championships	Nilai, Malaysia	
Team sprint (750 m)	51.927	Natthaporn Aphimot; Yaowaret Jitmat; Pannaray Rasee	26 September 2023	Asian Games	Chun'an, China	
3000 m individual pursuit	3:51.733	Supuksorn Nuntana	11 January 2019	Asian Championships	Jakarta, Indonesia	
4000 m individual pursuit	6:08.840	Aphitsara Srimongkhon	28 August 2026	Track Asia Cup	Bangkok, Thailand	
4000 m team pursuit						
Hour record						
