= 2026 UCI Track Cycling World Championships – Men's team sprint =

Men's team sprint at the 2026 UCI Track Cycling World Championships
- Venue: Shanghai Velodrome
- Location: Shanghai, China
- Dates: 14 October
- Competitors: 57 from 19 nations
- Teams: 19
- Winning time: 41.954

Medalists
gold medal	Jeffrey Hoogland; Harrie Lavreysen; Roy van den Berg	Netherlands
silver medal	Daniel Barber; Ryan Elliott; Leigh Hoffman	Australia
bronze medal	Jin Zhiheng; Li Zhiwei; Liu Qi	China

The men's team sprint competition at the 2026 UCI Track Cycling World Championships was held on 14 October 2026.

== Results ==
=== Qualifying ===
The qualifying was started at 15:20. The eight fastest teams advanced to the first round.

Rank	Nation	Time	Behind	Notes
1	Netherlands; Roy van den Berg; Harrie Lavreysen; Jeffrey Hoogland	42.351		Q
2	China; Jin Zhiheng; Li Zhiwei; Liu Qi	42.627	+0.276	Q
3	Japan; Yoshitaku Nagasako; Kaiya Ota; Minato Nakaishi	42.713	+0.362	Q
4	Australia; Ryan Elliott; Leigh Hoffman; Daniel Barber	42.736	+0.385	Q
5	Great Britain; Edward Lowe; Joseph Truman; Harry Ledingham-Horn	42.803	+0.452	Q
6	France; Timmy Gillion; Rayan Helal; Étienne Oliviero	42.907	+0.556	Q
7	Trinidad and Tobago; Zion Pulido; Njisane Phillip; Nicholas Paul	42.917	+0.566	Q
8	Czechia; Adam Rauschgold; Dominik Topinka; David Peterka	42.940	+0.589	Q
9	Germany; Nik Schröter; Luca Spiegel; Henric Hackmann	42.953	+0.602	
10	Italy; Filippo Cusumano; Matteo Bianchi; Mattia Predomo	43.444	+1.093	
11	Canada; Cole Dempster; Tyler Rorke; James Hedgcock	43.485	+1.134	
12	Individual Neutral Athletes; Nikita Afanasev; Igor Girilovich; Nikita Kalachnik	43.751	+1.400	
13	Thailand; Yeaunyong Petcharat; Jai Angsuthasawit; Norasetthada Bunma	44.183	+1.832	
14	Belgium; Runar De Schrijver; Thibault Van Laere; Lowie Nulens	44.202	+1.851	
15	Hong Kong; Mok Tsz Chun; To Cheuk Hei; Yung Tsun Ho	44.787	+2.436	
16	Malaysia; Muhammad Ridwan Sahrom; Fadhil Zonis; Muhammad Shah Firdaus Sahrom	44.815	+2.464	
17	Spain; Axel Moreno; José Moreno; Alejandro Martínez	44.952	+2.601	
18	Greece; Alexios Magklaris; Ioannis Kalogeropoulos; Konstantinos Livanos	44.957	+2.606	
19	South Korea; Oh Min-jae; Oh Je-seok; Choi Woo-rim	45.171	+2.820	

=== First round ===
The first round was started at 18:43.

First round heats were held as follows:
Heat 1: 4th v 5th fastest
Heat 2: 3rd v 6th fastest
Heat 3: 2nd v 7th fastest
Heat 4: 1st v 8th fastest

The heat winners were ranked on time, from which the top two advanced to the gold medal race and the other two proceeded to the bronze medal race.

Rank	Heat	Nation	Time	Notes
1	1	Australia; Daniel Barber; Ryan Elliott; Leigh Hoffman	42.346	QG
2	1	Great Britain; Harry Ledingham-Horn; Edward Lowe; Joseph Truman	42.716	
1	2	Japan; Yoshitaku Nagasako; Minato Nakaishi; Kaiya Ota	42.456	QB
2	2	France; Timmy Gillion; Rayan Helal; Étienne Oliviero	42.793	
1	3	China; Jin Zhiheng; Li Zhiwei; Liu Qi	42.495	QB
2	3	Trinidad and Tobago; Nicholas Paul; Njisane Phillip; Zion Pulido	42.684	
1	4	Netherlands; Jeffrey Hoogland; Harrie Lavreysen; Roy van den Berg	42.231	QG
2	4	Czechia; David Peterka; Adam Rauschgold; Dominik Topinka	42.948	

=== Finals ===
The finals were started at 20:05.

Rank	Nation	Time	Behind	Notes
Gold medal race
1st place, gold medalist(s)	Netherlands; Jeffrey Hoogland; Harrie Lavreysen; Roy van den Berg	41.954		
2nd place, silver medalist(s)	Australia; Daniel Barber; Ryan Elliott; Leigh Hoffman	42.470	+0.516	
Bronze medal race
3rd place, bronze medalist(s)	China; Jin Zhiheng; Li Zhiwei; Liu Qi	42.389		
4	Japan; Yoshitaku Nagasako; Minato Nakaishi; Kaiya Ota	43.644	+1.255	
