= Cycling at the 2026 Asian Games – Men's team sprint =

Men's team sprint at the 2026 Asian Games
- Venue: Izu Velodrome
- Dates: 29 September 2026
- Competitors: 23 from 8 nations

Medalists
gold medal	China; Jin Zhiheng; Li Zhiwei; Liu Qi; Xie Han
silver medal	Japan; Yoshitaku Nagasako; Kaiya Ota; Minato Nakaishi; Kanata Takahashi
bronze medal	Hong Kong; Mok Tsz Chun; To Cheuk Hei; Yung Tsun Ho

The men's team sprint event at the 2026 Asian Games was held on 29 September 2026.

== Schedule ==
All times are Japan Standard Time (UTC+09:00)

Date	Time	Event
Tuesday, 29 September 2026	10:18	Qualifying
Tuesday, 29 September 2026	15:12	First round
Tuesday, 29 September 2026	16:19	Finals

== Records ==
Prior to this competition, the existing world, Asian and Games records were as follows.

World Record	Netherlands	40.949	Saint-Quentin-en-Yvelines, France	6 August 2024
Asian Record	Japan	42.007	Konya, Turkey	14 March 2025
Games Record	Japan	42.934	Hangzhou, China	26 September 2023

== Results ==
Legend

- DNF — Did not finish

=== Qualifying ===
Teams are seeded for the First Round based on their qualifying time as follows:

- The 4th fastest team against the 5th fastest team.
- The 3rd fastest team against the 6th fastest team.
- The 2nd fastest team against the 7th fastest team.
- The fastest team start alone against the clock.

Rank	Team	Time	Notes
1	Japan (JPN); Yoshitaku Nagasako; Kanata Takahashi; Minato Nakaishi	43.301	
2	China (CHN); Jin Zhiheng; Liu Qi; Xie Han	43.691	
3	Kazakhstan (KAZ); Daniyar Shayakhmetov; Dmitriy Rezanov; Kirill Kurdidi	44.328	
4	Hong Kong (HKG); Mok Tsz Chun; To Cheuk Hei; Yung Tsun Ho	44.399	
5	South Korea (KOR); Oh Je-seok; Choi Tae-ho; Jung Ho-jin	44.781	
6	Malaysia (MAS); Akmal Nazimi Jusena; Ridwan Sahrom; Fadhil Zonis	44.827	
7	India (IND); Rojit Singh Yanglem; David Beckham; Ronaldo Laitonjam	44.895	
	Thailand (THA); Yeaunyong Petcharat; Jai Angsuthasawit; Norasetthada Bunma		DNF

=== First round ===
The fastest two winning teams race for the gold and silver medals, and the other two winning teams race for the bronze medal. Others are ranked 5th-7th places based on the time in the First Round.

==== Heat 1 ====
Rank	Team	Time	Notes
1	Hong Kong (HKG); Mok Tsz Chun; To Cheuk Hei; Yung Tsun Ho	44.116	QB
2	South Korea (KOR); Oh Je-seok; Choi Tae-ho; Choi Woo-rim	44.366	

==== Heat 2 ====
Rank	Team	Time	Notes
1	Malaysia (MAS); Akmal Nazimi Jusena; Ridwan Sahrom; Fadhil Zonis	44.210	QB
2	Kazakhstan (KAZ); Daniyar Shayakhmetov; Dmitriy Rezanov; Kirill Kurdidi	44.221	

==== Heat 3 ====
Rank	Team	Time	Notes
1	China (CHN); Jin Zhiheng; Li Zhiwei; Liu Qi	42.348	QG, GR
2	India (IND); Rojit Singh Yanglem; David Beckham; Ronaldo Laitonjam	44.374	

==== Heat 4 ====
Rank	Team	Time	Notes
1	Japan (JPN); Yoshitaku Nagasako; Kanata Takahashi; Kaiya Ota	42.836	QG

=== Finals ===
==== Bronze ====
Rank	Team	Time	Notes
3rd place, bronze medalist(s)	Hong Kong (HKG); Mok Tsz Chun; To Cheuk Hei; Yung Tsun Ho	43.507	
4	Malaysia (MAS); Akmal Nazimi Jusena; Ridwan Sahrom; Fadhil Zonis	44.341	

==== Gold ====
Rank	Team	Time	Notes
1st place, gold medalist(s)	China (CHN); Jin Zhiheng; Li Zhiwei; Liu Qi	42.152	GR
2nd place, silver medalist(s)	Japan (JPN); Yoshitaku Nagasako; Kaiya Ota; Minato Nakaishi	42.511	
