= List of Kazakhstani records in track cycling =

The following are the national records in track cycling in Kazakhstan maintained by Kazakhstan Cycling Federation.

== Men ==
Event	Record	Athlete	Date	Meet	Place	Ref
Flying 200 m time trial	9.766	Andrey Chugay	23 May 2021	Grand Prix of Moscow	Moscow, Russia	
250 m time trial (standing start)	17.811	Andrey Chugay	9 January 2019	Asian Championships	Jakarta, Indonesia	
500 m time trial	32.338	Maxim Nalyotov	18 February 2018	Asian Championships	Nilai, Malaysia	
1 km time trial	59.915	Kirill Kurdidi	31 March 2026	Asian Championships	Tagaytay, Philippines	
Team sprint	43.961	Daniyar Shayakhmetov; Dmitriy Rezanov; Kirill Kurdidi	25 March 2026	Asian Championships	Tagaytay, Philippines	
4000 m individual pursuit	4:15.731	Ilya Karabutov	30 March 2026	Asian Championships	Tagaytay, Philippines	
4000 m team pursuit	3:51.589	Ilya Karabutov; Alisher Zhumakan; Ramis Dinmukhametov; Dmitriy Noskov	29 September 2026	Asian Games	Izu, Japan	

== Women ==
Event	Record	Athlete	Date	Meet	Place	Ref
Flying 200 m time trial	11.529	Yuliya Golubkova	15 June 2023	Asian Championships	Nilai, Malaysia	
250 m time trial (standing start)	20.823	Yuliya Golubkova	19 June 2023	Asian Championships	Nilai, Malaysia	
500 m time trial	36.556	Yuliya Golubkova	19 June 2023	Asian Championships	Nilai, Malaysia	
3000 m individual pursuit	3:36.662	Rinata Sultanova	6 August 2022	Islamic Solidarity Games	Konya, Turkey	
4000 m individual pursuit	4:50.540	Rinata Sultanova	28 March 2026	Asian Championships	Tagaytay, Philippines	
4000 m team pursuit	4:46.698	Marina Kuzmina; Akpeiil Ossim; Violetta Kazakova; Anzhela Solovyeva	26 September 2023	Asian Games	Hangzhou, China	
