= Cycling at the 2026 Asian Games – Men's keirin =

Men's keirin at the 2026 Asian Games
- Venue: Izu Velodrome
- Dates: 2 October 2026
- Competitors: 18 from 10 nations

Medalists
| gold medal | Azizulhasni Awang | Malaysia |
| silver medal | Li Zhiwei | China |
| bronze medal | Xie Han | China |

The men's keirin event at the 2026 Asian Games was held on 2 October 2026.

== Schedule ==
All times are Japan Standard Time (UTC+09:00)

| Date | Time | Event |
|---|---|---|
| Friday, 2 October 2026 | 10:30 | First round |
| Friday, 2 October 2026 | 11:15 | Repechages |
| Friday, 2 October 2026 | 15:09 | Semifinals |
| Friday, 2 October 2026 | 16:57 | Finals |

== Results ==
Legend

- DNF — Did not finish

=== First round ===
==== Heat 1 ====
| Rank | Athlete | Gap |
|---|---|---|
| 1 | Xie Han (CHN) | |
| 2 | Azizulhasni Awang (MAS) | +0.036 |
| 3 | Kang Shih-feng (TPE) | +0.837 |
| 4 | Dika Alif Dhentaka (INA) | +1.019 |
| 5 | Yung Tsun Ho (HKG) | +1.160 |
| 6 | Choi Woo-rim (KOR) | +1.925 |

==== Heat 2 ====
| Rank | Athlete | Gap |
|---|---|---|
| 1 | To Cheuk Hei (HKG) | |
| 2 | Shah Firdaus Sahrom (MAS) | +0.042 |
| 3 | Jai Angsuthasawit (THA) | +0.053 |
| 4 | Andrey Chugay (KAZ) | +0.523 |
| 5 | Ronaldo Laitonjam (IND) | +0.571 |
| 6 | Li Zhiwei (CHN) | +1.009 |

==== Heat 3 ====
| Rank | Athlete | Gap |
|---|---|---|
| 1 | Minato Nakaishi (JPN) | |
| 2 | Kirill Kurdidi (KAZ) | +0.073 |
| 3 | David Beckham (IND) | +0.270 |
| 4 | Choi Tae-ho (KOR) | +0.391 |
| 5 | Dhia Tsabit Az Zakky Sutaryo (INA) | +0.565 |
| 6 | Norasetthada Bunma (THA) | +0.739 |

=== Repechages ===
==== Heat 1 ====
| Rank | Athlete | Gap |
|---|---|---|
| 1 | Andrey Chugay (KAZ) | |
| 2 | Kang Shih-feng (TPE) | +0.020 |
| 3 | Norasetthada Bunma (THA) | +0.170 |
| 4 | Choi Woo-rim (KOR) | +0.220 |
| 5 | Choi Tae-ho (KOR) | +0.430 |
| 6 | Ronaldo Laitonjam (IND) | +1.410 |

==== Heat 2 ====
| Rank | Athlete | Gap |
|---|---|---|
| 1 | Li Zhiwei (CHN) | |
| 2 | Yung Tsun Ho (HKG) | +0.042 |
| 3 | David Beckham (IND) | +0.064 |
| 4 | Dika Alif Dhentaka (INA) | +0.222 |
| 5 | Jai Angsuthasawit (THA) | +0.266 |
| 6 | Dhia Tsabit Az Zakky Sutaryo (INA) | +0.634 |

=== Semifinals ===
==== Heat 1 ====
| Rank | Athlete | Gap |
|---|---|---|
| 1 | Li Zhiwei (CHN) | |
| 2 | Xie Han (CHN) | +0.076 |
| 3 | Shah Firdaus Sahrom (MAS) | +0.087 |
| 4 | Kang Shih-feng (TPE) | +0.192 |
| 5 | David Beckham (IND) | +0.399 |
| 6 | Kirill Kurdidi (KAZ) | +1.878 |

==== Heat 2 ====
| Rank | Athlete | Gap |
|---|---|---|
| 1 | Azizulhasni Awang (MAS) | |
| 2 | Minato Nakaishi (JPN) | +0.058 |
| 3 | Yung Tsun Ho (HKG) | +0.234 |
| 4 | To Cheuk Hei (HKG) | +0.239 |
| 5 | Andrey Chugay (KAZ) | +0.387 |
| 6 | Norasetthada Bunma (THA) | +0.600 |

=== Finals ===
==== Final 7–12 ====
| Rank | Athlete | Gap |
|---|---|---|
| 1 | Kang Shih-feng (TPE) | |
| 2 | To Cheuk Hei (HKG) | +0.118 |
| 3 | Kirill Kurdidi (KAZ) | +0.317 |
| 4 | Andrey Chugay (KAZ) | +0.435 |
| 5 | Norasetthada Bunma (THA) | +0.563 |
| 6 | David Beckham (IND) | +1.359 |

==== Final ====
| Rank | Athlete | Gap |
|---|---|---|
| 1st place, gold medalist(s) | Azizulhasni Awang (MAS) | |
| 2nd place, silver medalist(s) | Li Zhiwei (CHN) | +0.018 |
| 3 | Xie Han (CHN) | +0.217 |
| 4 | Minato Nakaishi (JPN) | +0.267 |
| 5 | Shah Firdaus Sahrom (MAS) | +0.348 |
| 6 | Yung Tsun Ho (HKG) | +0.445 |
