= Cycling at the 2026 Asian Games – Men's sprint =

Men's sprint at the 2026 Asian Games
- Venue: Izu Velodrome
- Dates: 30 September – 1 October 2026
- Competitors: 19 from 10 nations

Medalists
| gold medal | Kaiya Ota | Japan |
| silver medal | Li Zhiwei | China |
| bronze medal | Azizulhasni Awang | Malaysia |

The men's sprint event at the 2026 Asian Games was held from 30 September to 1 October 2026.

== Schedule ==
All times are Japan Standard Time (UTC+09:00)

| Date | Time | Event |
|---|---|---|
| Wednesday, 30 September 2026 | 10:00 | Qualifying |
| Wednesday, 30 September 2026 | 10:40 | 1/16 finals |
| Wednesday, 30 September 2026 | 11:14 | 1/16 finals repechages |
| Wednesday, 30 September 2026 | 15:10 | 1/8 finals |
| Wednesday, 30 September 2026 | 15:56 | 1/8 finals repechages |
| Thursday, 1 October 2026 | 10:18 | Quarterfinals |
| Thursday, 1 October 2026 | 15:10 | Semifinals |
| Thursday, 1 October 2026 | 15:06 | Race for 5th–8th places |
| Thursday, 1 October 2026 | 16:33 | Finals |

== Records ==
Prior to this competition, the existing world, Asian and Games records were as follows.

| World Record | Matthew Richardson (GBR) | 8.857 | Konya, Turkey | 14 August 2025 |
| Asian Record | Kaiya Ota (JPN) | 9.348 | Tagaytay, Philippines | 28 March 2026 |
| Games Record | Zhou Yu (CHN) | 9.623 | Hangzhou, China | 27 September 2023 |

== Results ==
Legend

- DNF — Did not finish

=== Qualifying ===
| Rank | Athlete | Time | Notes |
|---|---|---|---|
| 1 | Kaiya Ota (JPN) | 9.400 | GR |
| 2 | Li Zhiwei (CHN) | 9.444 | |
| 3 | Azizulhasni Awang (MAS) | 9.467 | |
| 4 | Xie Han (CHN) | 9.501 | |
| 5 | Jai Angsuthasawit (THA) | 9.666 | |
| 6 | Kanata Takahashi (JPN) | 9.787 | |
| 7 | Kirill Kurdidi (KAZ) | 9.807 | |
| 8 | Kang Shih-feng (TPE) | 9.810 | |
| 9 | Shah Firdaus Sahrom (MAS) | 9.850 | |
| 10 | Choi Tae-ho (KOR) | 9.904 | |
| 11 | Yung Tsun Ho (HKG) | 9.948 | |
| 12 | Oh Je-seok (KOR) | 9.986 | |
| 13 | To Cheuk Hei (HKG) | 9.996 | |
| 14 | David Beckham (IND) | 9.996 | |
| 15 | Ronaldo Laitonjam (IND) | 10.052 | |
| 16 | Norasetthada Bunma (THA) | 10.078 | |
| 17 | Daniyar Shayakhmetov (KAZ) | 10.082 | |
| 18 | Dika Alif Dhentaka (INA) | 10.185 | |
| 19 | Dhia Tsabit Az Zakky Sutaryo (INA) | 10.589 | |

=== 1/16 finals ===
==== Heat 1 ====
| Rank | Athlete | Gap |
|---|---|---|
| 1 | Kaiya Ota (JPN) | |
| 2 | Norasetthada Bunma (THA) | +0.006 |

==== Heat 2 ====
| Rank | Athlete | Gap |
|---|---|---|
| 1 | Li Zhiwei (CHN) | |
| 2 | Ronaldo Laitonjam (IND) | +0.218 |

==== Heat 3 ====
| Rank | Athlete | Gap |
|---|---|---|
| 1 | Azizulhasni Awang (MAS) | |
| 2 | David Beckham (IND) | +0.053 |

==== Heat 4 ====
| Rank | Athlete | Gap |
|---|---|---|
| 1 | Xie Han (CHN) | |
| 2 | To Cheuk Hei (HKG) | +0.682 |

==== Heat 5 ====
| Rank | Athlete | Gap |
|---|---|---|
| 1 | Jai Angsuthasawit (THA) | |
| 2 | Oh Je-seok (KOR) | +0.163 |

==== Heat 6 ====
| Rank | Athlete | Gap |
|---|---|---|
| 1 | Kanata Takahashi (JPN) | |
| 2 | Yung Tsun Ho (HKG) | +2.492 |

==== Heat 7 ====
| Rank | Athlete | Gap |
|---|---|---|
| 1 | Choi Tae-ho (KOR) | |
| 2 | Kirill Kurdidi (KAZ) | +0.025 |

==== Heat 8 ====
| Rank | Athlete | Gap |
|---|---|---|
| 1 | Kang Shih-feng (TPE) | |
| 2 | Shah Firdaus Sahrom (MAS) | +0.024 |

=== 1/16 finals repechages ===
==== Heat 1 ====
| Rank | Athlete | Gap |
|---|---|---|
| 1 | Shah Firdaus Sahrom (MAS) | |
| 2 | Norasetthada Bunma (THA) | +0.005 |

==== Heat 2 ====
| Rank | Athlete | Gap |
|---|---|---|
| 1 | Kirill Kurdidi (KAZ) | |
| 2 | Ronaldo Laitonjam (IND) | +0.159 |

==== Heat 3 ====
| Rank | Athlete | Gap |
|---|---|---|
| 1 | Yung Tsun Ho (HKG) | |
| 2 | David Beckham (IND) | +0.191 |

==== Heat 4 ====
| Rank | Athlete | Gap |
|---|---|---|
| 1 | To Cheuk Hei (HKG) | |
| 2 | Oh Je-seok (KOR) | +0.051 |

=== 1/8 finals ===
==== Heat 1 ====
| Rank | Athlete | Gap |
|---|---|---|
| 1 | Kaiya Ota (JPN) | |
| 2 | To Cheuk Hei (HKG) | +1.301 |

==== Heat 2 ====
| Rank | Athlete | Gap |
|---|---|---|
| 1 | Li Zhiwei (CHN) | |
| 2 | Yung Tsun Ho (HKG) | +1.098 |

==== Heat 3 ====
| Rank | Athlete | Gap |
|---|---|---|
| 1 | Azizulhasni Awang (MAS) | |
| 2 | Kirill Kurdidi (KAZ) | +0.408 |

==== Heat 4 ====
| Rank | Athlete | Gap |
|---|---|---|
| 1 | Xie Han (CHN) | |
| 2 | Shah Firdaus Sahrom (MAS) | +0.168 |

==== Heat 5 ====
| Rank | Athlete | Gap |
|---|---|---|
| 1 | Jai Angsuthasawit (THA) | |
| 2 | Kang Shih-feng (TPE) | +0.012 |

==== Heat 6 ====
| Rank | Athlete | Gap |
|---|---|---|
| 1 | Kanata Takahashi (JPN) | |
| 2 | Choi Tae-ho (KOR) | +0.020 |

=== 1/8 finals repechage ===
==== Heat 1 ====
| Rank | Athlete | Gap |
|---|---|---|
| 1 | Kang Shih-feng (TPE) | |
| 2 | To Cheuk Hei (HKG) | +0.127 |
| 3 | Shah Firdaus Sahrom (MAS) | +0.132 |

==== Heat 2 ====
| Rank | Athlete | Gap |
|---|---|---|
| 1 | Kirill Kurdidi (KAZ) | |
| 2 | Choi Tae-ho (KOR) | +0.041 |
| 3 | Yung Tsun Ho (HKG) | +0.167 |

=== Quarterfinals ===
==== Heat 1 ====
| Rank | Athlete | Rane 1 | Race 2 | Decider |
|---|---|---|---|---|
| 1 | Kaiya Ota (JPN) | | | |
| 2 | Kirill Kurdidi (KAZ) | +0.192 | +0.758 | |

==== Heat 2 ====
| Rank | Athlete | Rane 1 | Race 2 | Decider |
|---|---|---|---|---|
| 1 | Li Zhiwei (CHN) | | | |
| 2 | Kang Shih-feng (TPE) | +1.711 | +0.280 | |

==== Heat 3 ====
| Rank | Athlete | Rane 1 | Race 2 | Decider |
|---|---|---|---|---|
| 1 | Azizulhasni Awang (MAS) | | | |
| 2 | Kanata Takahashi (JPN) | +0.049 | +0.039 | |

==== Heat 4 ====
| Rank | Athlete | Rane 1 | Race 2 | Decider |
|---|---|---|---|---|
| 1 | Jai Angsuthasawit (THA) | | +0.017 | |
| 2 | Xie Han (CHN) | +0.016 | | +0.044 |

=== Race for 5th–8th places ===
| Rank | Athlete | Gap |
|---|---|---|
| 1 | Kang Shih-feng (TPE) | |
| 2 | Kirill Kurdidi (KAZ) | +0.031 |
| 3 | Kanata Takahashi (JPN) | +0.077 |
| 4 | Xie Han (CHN) | +0.221 |

=== Semifinals ===
==== Heat 1 ====
| Rank | Athlete | Rane 1 | Race 2 | Decider |
|---|---|---|---|---|
| 1 | Kaiya Ota (JPN) | | | |
| 2 | Jai Angsuthasawit (THA) | +0.042 | +2.111 | |

==== Heat 2 ====
| Rank | Athlete | Rane 1 | Race 2 | Decider |
|---|---|---|---|---|
| 1 | Li Zhiwei (CHN) | | | |
| 2 | Azizulhasni Awang (MAS) | +0.172 | +0.004 | |

=== Finals ===
==== Bronze ====
| Rank | Athlete | Rane 1 | Race 2 | Decider |
|---|---|---|---|---|
| 1 | Azizulhasni Awang (MAS) | | | |
| 2 | Jai Angsuthasawit (THA) | DNF | +0.111 | |

==== Gold ====
| Rank | Athlete | Rane 1 | Race 2 | Decider |
|---|---|---|---|---|
| 1 | Kaiya Ota (JPN) | | | |
| 2 | Li Zhiwei (CHN) | +0.026 | 0.076 | |

== Final standing ==
| Rank | Athlete |
|---|---|
| 1st place, gold medalist(s) | Kaiya Ota (JPN) |
| 2nd place, silver medalist(s) | Li Zhiwei (CHN) |
| 3rd place, bronze medalist(s) | Azizulhasni Awang (MAS) |
| 4 | Jai Angsuthasawit (THA) |
| 5 | Kang Shih-feng (TPE) |
| 6 | Kirill Kurdidi (KAZ) |
| 7 | Kanata Takahashi (JPN) |
| 8 | Xie Han (CHN) |
| 9 | Shah Firdaus Sahrom (MAS) |
| 10 | Choi Tae-ho (KOR) |
| 11 | Yung Tsun Ho (HKG) |
| 12 | To Cheuk Hei (HKG) |
| 13 | Oh Je-seok (KOR) |
| 14 | David Beckham (IND) |
| 15 | Ronaldo Laitonjam (IND) |
| 16 | Norasetthada Bunma (THA) |
| 17 | Daniyar Shayakhmetov (KAZ) |
| 18 | Dika Alif Dhentaka (INA) |
| 19 | Dhia Tsabit Az Zakky Sutaryo (INA) |
