= Cycling at the 2022 Asian Games – Men's team sprint =

Men's team sprint at the 2022 Asian Games
- Venue: Chun'an Jieshou Sports Centre Velodrome
- Dates: 26 September 2023
- Competitors: 31 from 9 nations

Medalists
gold medal	Japan; Yoshitaku Nagasako, Kaiya Ota, Yuta Obara, Shinji Nakano
silver medal	China; Guo Shuai, Zhou Yu, Liu Qi, Xue Chenxi
bronze medal	Malaysia; Umar Hasbullah, Ridwan Sahrom, Fadhil Zonis

The men's team sprint event at the 2022 Asian Games was held on 26 September 2023.

== Schedule ==
All times are China Standard Time (UTC+08:00)

Date	Time	Event
Tuesday, 26 September 2023	10:21	Qualifying
Tuesday, 26 September 2023	15:12	First round
Tuesday, 26 September 2023	16:22	Finals

== Records ==
Prior to this competition, the existing world, Asian and Games records were as follows.

World Record	Netherlands	41.225	Berlin, Germany	26 February 2020
Asian Record	Japan	42.742	Jakarta, Indonesia	24 February 2023
Games Record	Japan	43.899	Jakarta, Indonesia	30 August 2018

== Results ==
Legend

- DNF — Did not finish

=== Qualifying ===
Rank	Team	Time	Notes
1	China (CHN); Guo Shuai; Xue Chenxi; Liu Qi	43.715	GR
2	Japan (JPN); Yoshitaku Nagasako; Kaiya Ota; Shinji Nakano	43.954	
3	Malaysia (MAS); Umar Hasbullah; Ridwan Sahrom; Fadhil Zonis	44.801	
4	Chinese Taipei (TPE); Yang Sheng-kai; Kang Shih-feng; Hsiao Shih-hsin	44.864	
5	Hong Kong (HKG); Mok Tsz Chun; To Cheuk Hei; Yung Tsun Ho	45.134	
6	South Korea (KOR); Kim Dong-ha; Kang Seo-jun; Oh Je-seok	45.241	
7	India (IND); Rojit Singh Yanglem; Esow Alben; Ronaldo Laitonjam	45.394	
8	Kazakhstan (KAZ); Kirill Kurdidi; Dmitriy Rezanov; Sergey Ponomaryov	45.509	
9	Thailand (THA); Wachirawit Saenkhamwong; Jai Angsuthasawit; Jaturong Niwanti	46.139	

=== First round ===
==== Heat 1 ====
Rank	Team	Time	Notes
1	Chinese Taipei (TPE); Yang Sheng-kai; Kang Shih-feng; Hsiao Shih-hsin	44.631	
2	Hong Kong (HKG); Mok Tsz Chun; To Cheuk Hei; Yung Tsun Ho	44.796	

==== Heat 2 ====
Rank	Team	Time	Notes
1	Malaysia (MAS); Umar Hasbullah; Ridwan Sahrom; Fadhil Zonis	44.929	
2	South Korea (KOR); Kim Dong-ha; Kang Seo-jun; Choi Woo-rim	DNF	

==== Heat 3 ====
Rank	Team	Time	Notes
1	Japan (JPN); Yoshitaku Nagasako; Kaiya Ota; Yuta Obara	43.330	GR
2	India (IND); Rojit Singh Yanglem; David Beckham; Ronaldo Laitonjam	44.609	

==== Heat 4 ====
Rank	Team	Time	Notes
1	China (CHN); Guo Shuai; Zhou Yu; Xue Chenxi	43.211	GR
2	Kazakhstan (KAZ); Kirill Kurdidi; Dmitriy Rezanov; Sergey Ponomaryov	44.817	

==== Summary ====
Rank	Team	Time
1	China (CHN)	43.211
2	Japan (JPN)	43.330
3	Chinese Taipei (TPE)	44.631
4	Malaysia (MAS)	44.929

=== Finals ===
==== Bronze ====
Rank	Team	Time	Notes
3rd place, bronze medalist(s)	Malaysia (MAS); Umar Hasbullah; Ridwan Sahrom; Fadhil Zonis	44.165	
4	Chinese Taipei (TPE); Yang Sheng-kai; Kang Shih-feng; Hsiao Shih-hsin	44.276	

==== Gold ====
Rank	Team	Time	Notes
1st place, gold medalist(s)	Japan (JPN); Yoshitaku Nagasako; Kaiya Ota; Yuta Obara	42.934	GR
2nd place, silver medalist(s)	China (CHN); Guo Shuai; Zhou Yu; Liu Qi	42.968	
