= 2020 Dubai Women's Tour =

Race details
- Dates: 17–20 February 2020
- Stages: 4

Results
Jersey awarded to the overall winner	Winner	Lucy van der Haar (GBR)	(Hitec Products–Birk Sport)
	Second	Tatsiana Sharakova (BLR)	(Minsk Cycling Club)
	Third	Samah Khaled (JOR)	(Team UAE)
Jersey awarded to the mountains classification winner	Mountains	Annabel Fisher (GBR)	(Cogeas–Mettler–Look)
Jersey awarded to the youth classification winner	Youth	Daniela Atehortua (COL)	(Colnago CM Team)
Jersey awarded to the sprints classification winner	Sprints	Lucy van der Haar (GBR)	(Hitec Products–Birk Sport)
	Team	Hitec Products–Birk Sport	

The 2020 Dubai Women's Tour was a women's cycle stage race held in Dubai from 17 to 20 February, 2020. The Dubai Women's Tour, being held for the first time, was held as a UCI rating of 2.2 race.

== Route ==
List of stages
Stage	Date	Course	Distance	Type	Winner	Team
1	17 February	Dubai Festival City to Town Square Dubai	99 km (61.5 mi)	Flat stage	Lucy van der Haar (GBR)	Hitec Products–Birk Sport
2	18 February	Dubai Festival City to The Springs Souk	106 km (65.9 mi)	Flat stage	Samah Khaled (JOR)	Team UAE
3	19 February	Wadi Hatta Park to Hatta Dam	90 km (55.9 mi)	Hilly stage	Tatsiana Sharakova (BLR)	Minsk Cycling Club
4	20 February	Dubai Festival City to Dubai Festival City	112 km (69.6 mi)	Flat stage	Nicole Steigenga (NED)	Doltcini–Van Eyck Sport

== Classification leadership table ==
Stage	Winner	General classification	Mountains classification	Sprint classification	Young rider classification	Team classification
1	Lucy van der Haar	Lucy van der Haar	Not awarded	Lucy van der Haar	Sofia Collinelli	Hitec Products–Birk Sport
2	Samah Khaled	Samah Khaled	Not awarded	Samah Khaled	Hanna Tserakh	Hitec Products–Birk Sport
3	Tatsiana Sharakova	Tatsiana Sharakova	Annabel Fisher	Tatsiana Sharakova	Daniela Atehortua	Hitec Products–Birk Sport
4	Nicole Steigenga	Lucy van der Haar	Annabel Fisher	Lucy van der Haar	Daniela Atehortua	Hitec Products–Birk Sport
Final		Lucy van der Haar	Annabel Fisher	Leah Kirchmann	Daniela Atehortua	Hitec Products–Birk Sport
