= Cycling at the 2018 Asian Games – Women's BMX racing =

Women's BMX race competition of 2018

Women's racing at the 2018 Asian Games
- Venue: Pulomas International BMX Center
- Date: 25 August 2018
- Competitors: 10 from 7 nations

Medalists
gold medal	Zhang Yaru	China
silver medal	Chutikan Kitwanitsathian	Thailand
bronze medal	Wiji Lestari	Indonesia

The women's BMX racing competition at the 2018 Asian Games in Jakarta was held on 25 August at the Pulomas International BMX Center.

== Schedule ==
All times are Western Indonesia Time (UTC+07:00)

Date	Time	Event
Saturday, 25 August 2018	09:05	Seeding run
Saturday, 25 August 2018	10:00	Motos
Saturday, 25 August 2018	11:20	Final

== Results ==
Legend

- DNS — Did not start

=== Seeding run ===
Rank	Athlete	Time
1	Sae Hatakeyama (JPN)	38.35
2	Lu Yan (CHN)	38.82
3	Wiji Lestari (INA)	40.12
4	Zhang Yaru (CHN)	41.18
5	Chutikan Kitwanitsathian (THA)	41.41
6	Cupi Nopianti (INA)	41.82
7	Chamavee Kerdmanee (THA)	42.69
8	Sienna Fines (PHI)	42.75
9	Noor Quraataina Mamat (MAS)	45.13
10	Valeria Sarmento (TLS)	54.62

=== Motos ===
==== Heat 1 ====
Rank	Athlete	Run 1		Run 2		Run 3		Total
Rank	Athlete	Time	Pts	Time	Pts	Time	Pts	Total
1	Sae Hatakeyama (JPN)	39.164	1	38.841	1	39.469	2	4
2	Zhang Yaru (CHN)	40.163	2	39.604	2	39.407	1	5
3	Chutikan Kitwanitsathian (THA)	41.485	3	40.231	3	40.838	3	9
4	Sienna Fines (PHI)	42.731	4	42.277	4	43.135	4	12
5	Noor Quraataina Mamat (MAS)	43.386	5	43.192	5	DNS	7	17

==== Heat 2 ====
Rank	Athlete	Run 1		Run 2		Run 3		Total
Rank	Athlete	Time	Pts	Time	Pts	Time	Pts	Total
1	Lu Yan (CHN)	38.942	1	39.158	1	38.202	1	3
2	Wiji Lestari (INA)	39.808	2	40.255	2	40.080	2	6
3	Cupi Nopianti (INA)	41.315	3	41.374	3	41.799	3	9
4	Chamavee Kerdmanee (THA)	41.435	4	41.487	4	42.407	4	12
5	Valeria Sarmento (TLS)	53.663	5	54.175	5	54.168	5	15

=== Final ===
Rank	Athlete	Time
1st place, gold medalist(s)	Zhang Yaru (CHN)	39.643
2nd place, silver medalist(s)	Chutikan Kitwanitsathian (THA)	40.379
3rd place, bronze medalist(s)	Wiji Lestari (INA)	40.788
4	Chamavee Kerdmanee (THA)	42.471
5	Sienna Fines (PHI)	43.663
6	Cupi Nopianti (INA)	44.083
7	Lu Yan (CHN)	1:17.451
8	Sae Hatakeyama (JPN)	1:27.372
