= Asian record =

An Asian record may refer to:

== Sports ==
- List of Asian records in athletics
- List of Asian records in swimming
- List of Asian records in track cycling
- List of Asian records in weightlifting

== Multi-sport events ==
- List of Asian Games records in athletics
- List of Asian Games records in swimming
- List of Asian Games records in track cycling
- List of Asian Games records in weightlifting
- List of Asian Indoor Games records in athletics

== Championships ==
- List of Asian Athletics Championships records
- List of Asian Indoor Athletics Championships records
