= Cycling at the 2026 Asian Games – Men's omnium =

Men's omnium at the 2026 Asian Games
- Venue: Izu Velodrome
- Dates: 1 October 2026
- Competitors: 14 from 14 nations

Medalists
gold medal	Kanta Umezawa	Japan
silver medal	Chu Tsun Wai	Hong Kong
bronze medal	Wu Junjie	China

The men's omnium event at the 2026 Asian Games was held on 1 October 2026.

== Schedule ==
Date	Time	Event
Thursday, 1 October 2026	10:00	Scratch race
Thursday, 1 October 2026	11:26	Tempo race
Thursday, 1 October 2026	15:27	Elimination race
Thursday, 1 October 2026	17:03	Points race

== Results ==
Legend

- DNF — Did not finish
- DNS — Did not start

=== Scratch race ===
Rank	Athlete	Laps down	Points
1	Chu Tsun Wai (HKG)		40
2	Kanta Umezawa (JPN)		38
3	Li Jing-feng (TPE)		36
4	Sergey Rostovtsev (UZB)		34
5	Kim Hyeon-seok (KOR)		32
6	Bernard Van Aert (INA)		30
7	Wu Junjie (CHN)		28
8	Alisher Zhumakan (KAZ)		26
9	Lau New Joe (MAS)		24
10	Harshveer Sekhon (IND)		22
11	Mohammad Al Mutaiwei (UAE)		20
12	Arash Mirbagheri (IRI)		18
13	Lao Long San (MAC)		16
14	Warut Paekrathok (THA)		14

=== Tempo race ===
Rank	Athlete	Sprints won	Laps		Total	Finish order	Points
Rank	Athlete	Sprints won	+	−	Total	Finish order	Points
1	Alisher Zhumakan (KAZ)	6, 16, 17, 18, 21	20		25	12	40
2	Kanta Umezawa (JPN)	7, 8, 20	20		23	4	38
3	Chu Tsun Wai (HKG)	2, 15, 19	20		23	8	36
4	Harshverr Sekhon (IND)	22, 23, 24, 25, 26, 27, 28, 29, 30, 34			10	2	34
5	Kim Hyeon-seok (KOR)	5, 31, 32, 33, 35, 36			6	1	32
6	Sergey Rostovtsev (UZB)	1, 10, 11			3	6	30
7	Lau New Joe (MAS)	12, 13, 14			3	10	28
8	Mohammad Al Mutaiwei (UAE)	9			1	5	26
9	Bernard Van Aert (INA)	4			1	7	24
10	Wu Junjie (CHN)	3			1	11	22
11	Li Jing-feng (TPE)				0	3	20
12	Arash Mirbagheri (IRI)				0	9	18
13	Lao Long San (MAC)			20	–20	13	16
14	Warut Paekrathok (THA)			40	DNF		–26

=== Elimination race ===
Rank	Athlete	Points
1	Kanta Umezawa (JPN)	40
2	Chu Tsun Wai (HKG)	38
3	Kim Hyeon-seok (KOR)	36
4	Bernard Van Aert (INA)	34
5	Sergey Rostovtsev (UZB)	32
6	Lau New Joe (MAS)	30
7	Wu Junjie (CHN)	28
8	Li Jing-feng (TPE)	26
9	Mohammad Al Mutaiwei (UAE)	24
10	Harshverr Sekhon (IND)	22
11	Lao Long San (MAC)	20
12	Arash Mirbagheri (IRI)	18
13	Alisher Zhumakan (KAZ)	16

=== Points race ===
Rank	Athlete	Sprint										Laps		Total	Finish order
Rank	Athlete	1	2	3	4	5	6	7	8	9	10	+	−	Total	Finish order
1	Wu Junjie (CHN)	3	3			3	5	2	2	1		60		79	7
2	Kanta Umezawa (JPN)			1	5				5		6	60		77	2
3	Alisher Zhumakan (KAZ)		2		1	2	1				10	40		56	1
4	Chu Tsun Wai (HKG)	1			3				3	5		40		52	8
5	Li Jing-feng (TPE)		1				3					40		44	5
6	Sergey Rostovtsev (UZB)			2		5		5	1	2	4	20		39	3
7	Mohammad Al Mutaiwei (UAE)	5	5	3			2	3				20		38	6
8	Lau New Joe (MAS)				2	1				3	2	20		28	4
9	Harshveer Sekhon (IND)			5							4			6	9
10	Arash Mirbagheri (IRI)	2												2	12
11	Bernard Van Aert (INA)													0	11
12	Kim Hyeon-seok (KOR)												20	–20	10
13	Lao Long San (MAC)												40	DNF	

=== Summary ===
Rank	Athlete	Scratch race	Tempo race	Elim. race	Points race	Total
1st place, gold medalist(s)	Kanta Umezawa (JPN)	38	38	40	77	193
2nd place, silver medalist(s)	Chu Tsun Wai (HKG)	40	36	38	52	166
3rd place, bronze medalist(s)	Wu Junjie (CHN)	28	22	28	79	157
4	Alisher Zhumakan (KAZ)	26	40	16	56	138
5	Sergey Rostovtsev (UZB)	34	30	32	39	135
6	Li Jing-feng (TPE)	36	20	26	44	126
7	Lau New Joe (MAS)	24	28	30	28	110
8	Mohammad Al Mutaiwei (UAE)	20	26	24	38	108
9	Bernard Van Aert (INA)	30	24	34	0	88
10	Harshveer Sekhon (IND)	22	34	22	6	84
11	Kim Hyeon-seok (KOR)	32	32	36	–20	80
12	Arash Mirbagheri (IRI)	18	18	18	2	56
13	Lao Long San (MAC)	16	16	20	DNF	DNF
—	Warut Paekrathok (THA)	14	–26	ABD		DNF
