= List of Asian Games records in track cycling =

Asian Games records in the sport of track cycling are ratified by the Asian Cycling Confederation (ACC).

== Men's records ==
Event	Record	Athlete	Nation	Date	Meet	Place	Ref
Flying 200 m time trial	9.400	Kaiya Ota	Japan	30 September 2026	2026 Asian Games	Izu, Japan	
Team sprint	42.152	Jin Zhiheng; Li Zhiwei; Liu Qi	China	29 September 2026	2026 Asian Games	Izu, Japan	
1 km time trial	1:04.607	Feng Yong	China	9 December 2006	2006 Asian Games	Doha, Qatar	
4000 m individual pursuit	4:19.672	Park Sang-hoon	South Korea	29 August 2018	2018 Asian Games	Jakarta, Indonesia	
4000 m team pursuit	3:47.621	Sun Wentao; Yang Yang; Wu Junjie; Pei Zhengyu	China	30 September 2026	2026 Asian Games	Izu, Japan	

== Women's records ==
Event	Record	Athlete	Nation	Date	Meet	Place	Ref
Flying 200 m time trial	10.155	Yuan Liying	China	1 October 2026	2026 Asian Games	Izu, Japan	
Team sprint (500 m)	32.936	Lin Junhong; Zhong Tianshi	China	27 August 2018	2018 Asian Games	Jakarta, Indonesia	
Team sprint (750 m)	45.370	Luo Xuehuang; Yuan Liying; Jiang Yulu	China	29 September 2026	2026 Asian Games	Izu, Japan	
500 m time trial	33.945	Lee Wai Sze	Hong Kong	13 November 2010	2010 Asian Games	Guangzhou, China	
3000 m individual pursuit	3:33.048	Lee Ju-mi	South Korea	30 August 2018	2018 Asian Games	Jakarta, Indonesia	
4000 m team pursuit	4:08.818	Gong Xianbing; Chen Ning; Wang Xiaoyue; Wei Suwan	China	30 September 2026	2026 Asian Games	Izu, Japan	
