= Cycling at the 2026 Asian Games – Women's sprint =

Women's sprint at the 2026 Asian Games
- Venue: Izu Velodrome
- Dates: 1–2 October 2026
- Competitors: 15 from 8 nations

Medalists
gold medal	Yuan Liying	China
silver medal	Mina Sato	Japan
bronze medal	Jiang Yulu	China

The women's sprint event at the 2026 Asian Games was held from 1 to 2 October 2026.

== Schedule ==
All times are Japan Standard Time (UTC+09:00)

Date	Time	Event
Thursday, 1 October 2026	10:30	Qualifying
Thursday, 1 October 2026	11:02	1/16 finals
Thursday, 1 October 2026	15:09	1/16 finals repechages
Thursday, 1 October 2026	16:39	1/8 finals
Thursday, 1 October 2026	17:48	1/8 finals repechages
Friday, 2 October 2026	10:18	Quarterfinals
Friday, 2 October 2026	15:00	Semifinals
Friday, 2 October 2026	15:06	Race for 5th–8th places
Friday, 2 October 2026	16:51	Finals

== Records ==
Prior to this competition, the existing world, Asian and Games records were as follows.

World Record	Emma Finucane (GBR)	9.759	Konya, Turkey	2 February 2026
Asian Record	Yuan Liying (CHN)	9.976	Konya, Turkey	15 March 2025
Games Record	Yuan Liying (CHN)	10.557	Hangzhou, China	28 September 2023

== Results ==
Legend

- DNF — Did not finish

=== Qualifying ===
Rank	Athlete	Time	Notes
1	Yuan Liying (CHN)	10.155	GR
2	Mina Sato (JPN)	10.209	
3	Jiang Yulu (CHN)	10.352	
4	Nur Alyssa Mohd Farid (MAS)	10.708	
5	Aki Sakai (JPN)	10.750	
6	Nurul Izzah Izzati Mohd Asri (MAS)	10.764	
7	Cho Sun-young (KOR)	10.972	
8	Yeung Cho Yiu (HKG)	10.979	
9	Liu Shang-ying (TPE)	10.983	
10	Ching Yin Shan (HKG)	11.035	
11	Kim Hae-un (KOR)	11.156	
12	Keerthi Chikka (IND)	11.237	
13	Chen Ching-yun (TPE)	11.372	
14	Celestina Chelobroy (IND)	11.380	
15	Samah Khaled (JOR)	12.496	

=== 1/16 finals ===
==== Heat 1 ====
Rank	Athlete	Gap
1	Yuan Liying (CHN)	

==== Heat 2 ====
Rank	Athlete	Gap
1	Mina Sato (JPN)	
2	Samah Khaled (JOR)	+0.068

==== Heat 3 ====
Rank	Athlete	Gap
1	Jiang Yulu (CHN)	
2	Celestina Chelobroy (IND)	+2.189

==== Heat 4 ====
Rank	Athlete	Gap
1	Nur Alyssa Mohd Farid (MAS)	
2	Chen Ching-yun (TPE)	+0.527

==== Heat 5 ====
Rank	Athlete	Gap
1	Aki Sakai (JPN)	
2	Keerthi Chikka (IND)	+0.249

==== Heat 6 ====
Rank	Athlete	Gap
1	Nurul Izzah Izzati Mohd Asri (MAS)	
2	Kim Hae-un (KOR)	+0.319

==== Heat 7 ====
Rank	Athlete	Gap
1	Ching Yin Shan (HKG)	
2	Cho Sun-young (KOR)	+0.016

==== Heat 8 ====
Rank	Athlete	Gap
1	Yeung Cho Yiu (HKG)	
2	Liu Shang-ying (TPE)	+0.064

=== 1/16 finals repechages ===
==== Heat 1 ====
Rank	Athlete	Gap
1	Liu Shang-ying (TPE)	

==== Heat 2 ====
Rank	Athlete	Gap
1	Cho Sun-young (KOR)	
2	Samah Khaled (JOR)	+0.800

==== Heat 3 ====
Rank	Athlete	Gap
1	Kim Hae-un (KOR)	
2	Celestina Chelobroy (IND)	+0.085

==== Heat 4 ====
Rank	Athlete	Gap
1	Chen Ching-yun (TPE)	
2	Keerthi Chikka (IND)	+0.049

=== 1/8 finals ===
==== Heat 1 ====
Rank	Athlete	Gap
1	Liying Liying (CHN)	
2	Chen Ching-yun (TPE)	+0.892

==== Heat 2 ====
Rank	Athlete	Gap
1	Mina Sato (JPN)	
2	Kim Hae-un (KOR)	+0.105

==== Heat 3 ====
Rank	Athlete	Gap
1	Jiang Yulu (CHN)	
2	Cho Sun-young (KOR)	+0.688

==== Heat 4 ====
Rank	Athlete	Gap
1	Nur Alyssa Mohd Farid (MAS)	
2	Liu Shang-ying (TPE)	+0.145

==== Heat 5 ====
Rank	Athlete	Gap
1	Aki Sakai (JPN)	
2	Yeung Cho Yiu (HKG)	+0.021

==== Heat 6 ====
Rank	Athlete	Gap
1	Nurul Izzah Izzati Mohd Asri (MAS)	
2	Ching Yin Shan (HKG)	+0.927

=== 1/8 finals repechage ===
==== Heat 1 ====
Rank	Athlete	Gap
1	Yeung Cho Yiu (HKG)	
2	Liu Shang-ying (TPE)	+0.012
3	Chen Ching-yun (TPE)	+1.368

==== Heat 2 ====
Rank	Athlete	Gap
1	Ching Yin Shan (HKG)	
2	Cho Sun-young (KOR)	+0.044
3	Kim Hae-un (KOR)	+0.279

=== Quarterfinals ===
==== Heat 1 ====
Rank	Athlete	Rane 1	Race 2	Decider
1	Yuan Liying (CHN)			
2	Ching Yin Shan (HKG)	+0.211	+0.455	

==== Heat 2 ====
Rank	Athlete	Rane 1	Race 2	Decider
1	Mina Sato (JPN)			
2	Yeung Cho Yiu (HKG)	+0.076	+0.033	

==== Heat 3 ====
Rank	Athlete	Rane 1	Race 2	Decider
1	Jiang Yulu (CHN)			
2	Nurul Izzah Izzati Mohd Asri (MAS)	+0.120	+0.099	

==== Heat 4 ====
Rank	Athlete	Rane 1	Race 2	Decider
1	Nur Alyssa Mohd Farid (MAS)			
2	Aki Sakai (JPN)	+0.120	+0.099	

=== Race for 5th–8th places ===
Rank	Athlete	Gap
1	Aki Sakai (JPN)	
2	Yeung Cho Yiu (HKG)	+0.140
3	Nurul Izzah Izzati Mohd Asri (MAS)	+0.146
4	Ching Yin Shan (HKG)	+0.365

=== Semifinals ===
==== Heat 1 ====
Rank	Athlete	Rane 1	Race 2	Decider
1	Yuan Liying (CHN)			
2	Nur Alyssa Mohd Farid (MAS)	+0.172	+0.110	

==== Heat 2 ====
Rank	Athlete	Rane 1	Race 2	Decider
1	Mina Sato (JPN)			
2	Jiang Yulu (CHN)	+0.008	+0.139	

=== Finals ===
==== Bronze ====
Rank	Athlete	Rane 1	Race 2	Decider
1	Jiang Yulu (CHN)			
2	Nur Alyssa Mohd Farid (MAS)	+0.792	+0.100	

==== Gold ====
Rank	Athlete	Rane 1	Race 2	Decider
1	Yuan Liying (CHN)			
2	Mina Sato (JPN)	+0.256	+0.092	

== Final standing ==
Rank	Athlete
1st place, gold medalist(s)	Yuan Liying (CHN)
2nd place, silver medalist(s)	Mina Sato (JPN)
3rd place, bronze medalist(s)	Jiang Yulu (CHN)
4	Nur Alyssa Mohd Farid (MAS)
5	Aki Sakai (JPN)
6	Yeung Cho Yiu (HKG)
7	Nurul Izzah Izzati Mohd Asri (MAS)
8	Ching Yin Shan (HKG)
9	Cho Sun-young (KOR)
10	Liu Shang-ying (TPE)
11	Kim Hae-un (KOR)
12	Chen Ching-yun (TPE)
13	Keerthi Chikka (IND)
14	Celestina Chelobroy (IND)
15	Samah Khaled (JOR)
