= List of Asian records in track cycling =

Asian records in the sport of track cycling are ratified by the Asian Cycling Confederation (ACC).

== Men's records ==
Event	Record	Athlete	Nation	Date	Meet	Place	Ref
Flying 200 m time trial	9.348	Kaiya Ota	Japan	29 March 2026	Asian Championships	Tagaytay, Philippines	
250 m time trial (standing start)	17.217	Yoshitaku Nagasako	Japan	14 March 2025	Nations Cup	Konya, Turkey	
500 m time trial	31.909	Seiichiro Nakagawa	Japan	7 December 2013	World Cup	Aguascalientes, Mexico	
1 km time trial	59.796 (Note: by official result source; 59.769 by ACC source, a typo)	Yuta Obara	Japan	14 October 2022	World Championships	Saint-Quentin-en-Yvelines, France	
1 km time trial (sea level)	59.796 (Note: by official result source; 59.769 by ACC source, a typo)	Yuta Obara	Japan	14 October 2022	World Championships	Saint-Quentin-en-Yvelines, France	
Team sprint (750 m)	42.007	Yoshitaku Nagasako; Kaiya Ota; Yuta Obara	Japan	14 March 2025	Nations Cup	Konya, Turkey	
4000 m individual pursuit	4:07.136	Pei Zhengyu	China	30 March 2026	Asian Championships	Tagaytay, Philippines	
4000 m team pursuit	3:48.127	Naoki Kojima; Eiya Hashimoto; Kazushige Kuboki; Shoi Matsuda	Japan	15 March 2024	Nations Cup	Hong Kong	
4000 m team pursuit	3:47.621	Sun Wentao; Yang Yang; Wu Junjie; Pei Zhengyu	China	30 September 2026	Asian Games	Izu, Japan	
Hour record	52.468 km	Shunsuke Imamura	Japan	23 November 2020		Izu, Japan	

== Women's records ==
Event	Record	Athlete	Nation	Date	Meet	Place	Ref
Flying 200 m time trial	9.976	Yuan Liying	China	15 March 2025	Nations Cup	Konya, Turkey	
250 m time trial (standing start)	18.282	Gong Jinjie	China	12 August 2016	Olympic Games	Rio de Janeiro, Brazil	
500 m time trial	33.214	Guo Yufang	China	15 October 2022	World Championships	Saint-Quentin-en-Yvelines, France	
500 m time trial	32.957	Guo Yufang	China	9 July 2022	Nations Cup	Cali, Colombia	
500 m time trial (sea level)	32.957	Guo Yufang	China	9 July 2022	Nations Cup	Cali, Colombia	
1 km time trial	1:06.229	Nurul Izzah Izzati Mohd Asri	Malaysia	26 February 2025	Asian Championships	Nilai, Malaysia	
1 km time trial	1:05.120	Luo Xuehuang	China	31 March 2026	Asian Championships	Tagaytay, Philippines	
1 km time trial	1:02.857	Yuan Liying	China	26 July 2026	Chinese Championships	Zigong, China	
Team sprint (500 m)	31.804 WR	Bao Shanju; Zhong Tianshi	China	2 August 2021	Olympic Games	Izu, Japan	
Team sprint (750 m)	45.487	Guo Yufang; Bao Shanju; Yuan Liying	China	26 June 2024	Chinese Track League	Luoyang, China	
Team sprint (750 m)	45.370	Luo Xuehuang; Yuan Liying; Jiang Yulu	China	29 September 2026	Asian Games	Izu, Japan	
3000 m individual pursuit	3:30.850	Maho Kakita	Japan	19 October 2024	World Championships	Ballerup, Denmark	
3000 m individual pursuit	3:30.486	Tsuyaka Uchino	Japan	15 May 2023	Japanese Championships	Izu, Japan	
4000 m individual pursuit	4:32.318	Wei Suwan	China	28 March 2026	Asian Championships	Tagaytay, Philippines	
3000 m team pursuit*	3:23.083	Jiang Fan; Jiang Wenwen; Liang Jing	China	5 April 2012	World Championships	Melbourne, Australia	
4000m team pursuit	4:09.438	Chen Ning; Gong Xianbing; Wang Xiaoyue; Wei Suwan	China	25 March 2026	Asian Championships	Tagaytay, Philippines	
4000m team pursuit	4:08.818	Gong Xianbing; Chen Ning; Wang Xiaoyue; Wei Suwan	China	30 September 2026	Asian Games	Izu, Japan	
Hour record	44.304 km	Maho Kakita	Japan	19 September 2025		Izu, Japan	

* In 2013, the 3000m team pursuit, 3 rider format was replaced by the UCI with a 4000m team pursuit, 4 person format.
