= Arash Mirbagheri =

Iranian cyclist

Personal information
- Full name: Seyed Mohammad Nabi Mirbagheri Firoozabadi
- Nickname: Arash Mirbagheri
- Born: 14 April 2007 (age 19) Yazd, Iran
- Height: 1.78 m (5 ft 10 in)
- Weight: 66 kg (146 lb)

Cycling career
- Sport: Cycling
- Discipline: Road
- Role: Rider

Arash Mirbagheri (Persian: آرش میرباقری; born 14 April 2007) is an Iranian racing cyclist.

== Major results ==
2025

Asian Championships Thailand

1st Individual Time trial
2nd Road race

2025

Asian Track Championships Malaysia

2nd Omnium

3rd Points Race

3rd Individual Pursuit
