= Cycling at the 2026 Asian Games – Women's BMX racing =

Women's BMX racing at the 2026 Asian Games
- Venue: Nagoya Velodrome BMX Race Course
- Date: 28 September 2026
- Competitors: 11 from 6 nations

Medalists
gold medal	Sae Hatakeyama	Japan
silver medal	Liao Wanyi	China
bronze medal	Jasmine Azzahra Setyobudi	Indonesia

The women's BMX racing competition at the 2026 Asian Games was held on 28 September 2026 at the Nagoya Velodrome BMX Race Course. Sae Hatakeyama of Japan won the gold medal, helping Japan sweep BMX racing golds.

== Schedule ==
All times are Japan Standard Time (UTC+09:00)

Date	Time	Event
Monday, 28 September 2026	10:45	Motos run 1
Monday, 28 September 2026	11:15	Motos run 2
Monday, 28 September 2026	11:45	Motos run 3
Monday, 28 September 2026	12:15	Final

== Results ==
Legend

- REL — Relegated

=== Motos ===
==== Heat 1 ====
Rank	Athlete	Run 1		Run 2		Run 3		Total
Rank	Athlete	Time	Pts	Time	Pts	Time	Pts	Total
1	Sae Hatakeyama (JPN)	32.872	1	32.649	1	32.511	1	3
2	Liao Wanyi (CHN)	34.555	2	34.762	2	34.135	2	6
3	Chutikan Kitwanitsathian (THA)	36.604	3	36.580	3	36.088	3	9
4	Hathaipech Jaisawang (THA)	37.559	4	37.785	4	37.963	5	13
5	Park A-yeon (KOR)	40.617	5	38.669	5	36.776	4	14

==== Heat 2 ====
Rank	Athlete	Run 1		Run 2		Run 3		Total
Rank	Athlete	Time	Pts	Time	Pts	Time	Pts	Total
1	Wang Mengyao (CHN)	34.252	1	33.647	1	34.499	2	4
2	Amellya Nur Sifa (INA)	34.886	2	34.492	2	34.392	1	5
3	Jasmine Azzahra Setyobudi (INA)	35.339	3	34.736	3	34.862	3	9
4	Neneka Nishimura (JPN)	35.451	4	35.374	4	35.397	4	12
5	Kim Ye-seo (KOR)	39.381	5	38.894	5	38.803	5	15
6	Noel Vanessa Kwok (HKG)	42.588	6	42.326	6	42.232	6	18

Riders ranked 1–4 in each heat qualified for the final.

=== Final ===
Rank	Athlete	Time
1st place, gold medalist(s)	Sae Hatakeyama (JPN)	33.401
2nd place, silver medalist(s)	Liao Wanyi (CHN)	34.500
3rd place, bronze medalist(s)	Jasmine Azzahra Setyobudi (INA)	34.932
4	Neneka Nishimura (JPN)	35.043
5	Amellya Nur Sifa (INA)	35.764
6	Chutikan Kitwanitsathian (THA)	36.269
7	Hathaipech Jaisawang (THA)	36.917
8	Wang Mengyao (CHN)	REL
