= Daniela Atehortua =

Colombian cyclist

Daniela Atehortúa
Personal information
- Full name: Daniela Atehortúa Hoyos
- Born: 16 April 1999 (age 27) El Carmen de Viboral, Colombia

Cycling career
- Sport: Cycling
- Discipline: Road
- Role: Rider

Amateur team
- 2020–2021: Colnago CM Team

Professional teams
- 2021: Colnago CM Team
- 2022: Team Illuminate

Daniela Atehortúa Hoyos (born 30 March 1999) is a Colombian professional racing cyclist. As a junior, she was the 2017 Pan-American Junior Road Cycling champion, and the overall winner in the 2019 Vuelta a Colombia Femenina. In 2020 she was the under-23 bronze medal-winner at the Colombian National Road Race Championships and the Best Young Rider (Under 23) at the Dubai Women's Tour.

Professionally, she rode for UCI Women's Continental Team Colnago CM Team until 2021, when the team was dissolved, then for Team Illuminate. She rode in the women's road race event in the 2020 UCI Road World Championships.

Atehortúa was born in Carmen de Viboral, Colombia. She also skated competitively before deciding to focus on cycling.
