= Kanta Umezawa =

Japanese track cyclist

Personal information
- Born: 23 June 2004 (age 22)

Cycling career
- Sport: Cycling
- Current team: HPCJC–Bridgestone Anchor
- Disciplines: Track; Road
- Role: Rider

Amateur teams
- 2017–2019: Equipe U Racing
- 2020–2022: Matsuyama Technical High School
- 2023–2024: NIFS in Kanoya
- 2026–: HPCJC–Bridgestone Anchor

Professional team
- 2025: Team Bridgestone Cycling
Medal record
Men's track cycling
Representing Japan
Asian Games
Gold medal – first place	2026 Aichi–Nagoya	Omnium
Silver medal – second place	2026 Aichi–Nagoya	Team pursuit
Asian Championships
Gold medal – first place	2026 Tagaytay	Points race
Silver medal – second place	2026 Tagaytay	Team pursuit

Kanta Umezawa (Japanese: 梅澤 幹太; born 23 June 2004) is a Japanese track cyclist. He won the gold medal in the men's omnium at the 2026 Asian Games in Aichi-Nagoya, Japan, and a silver medal in the men's team pursuit at the same competition.

== Career ==
Umezawa is a student at the National Institute of Fitness and Sports in Kanoya, where he competes as a member of the university's cycling team. In 2026, he was selected to represent Japan in track cycling at the 2026 Asian Games.

At the 2026 Asian Track Cycling Championships in Tagaytay, Philippines, Umezawa won gold in the men's points race and silver in the team pursuit as part of the Japanese team.

At the 2026 Asian Games, Umezawa won silver in the men's team pursuit on 30 September. The following day, he won the men's omnium, a four-race track cycling event. He moved into the lead during the elimination race and maintained his advantage in the final points race to secure the gold medal.
