= Annabel Fisher =

British cyclist

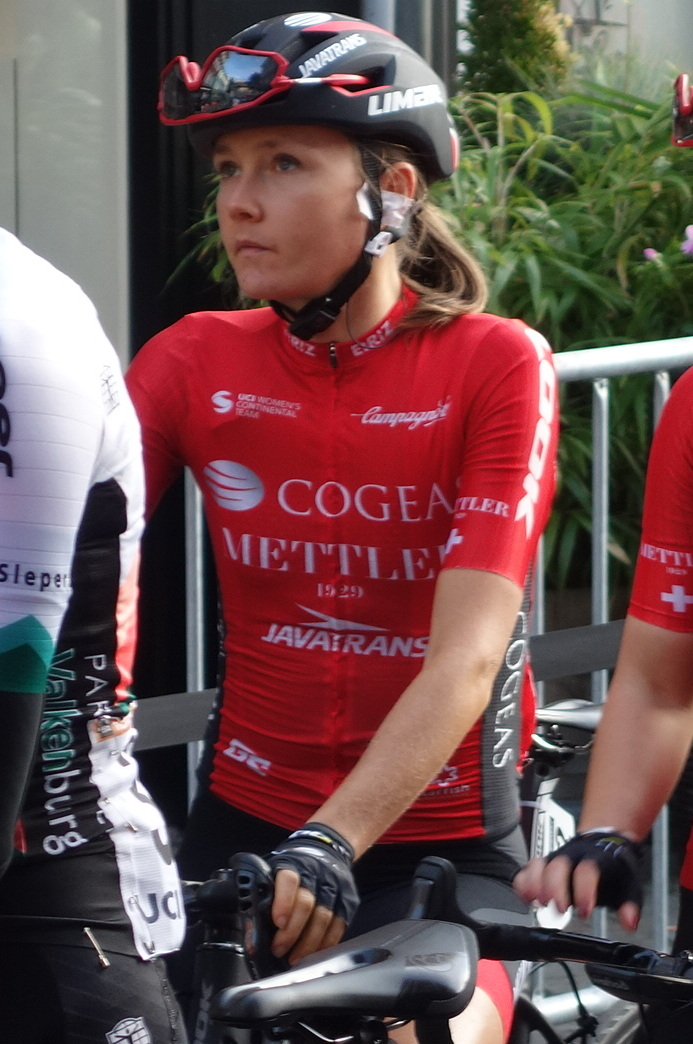
- Fisher at the 2020 Flèche Wallonne

Personal information
- Full name: Annabel Elizabeth Fisher
- Born: 19 September 1989 (age 37) Leeds, Yorkshire, England
- Height: 172 cm (5 ft 8 in)
- Weight: 45 kg (99 lb)

Cycling career
- Sport: Cycling
- Current team: Café du Cycliste
- Discipline: Gravel
- Role: Rider
- Rider type: Climber

Professional teams
- 2020: Cogeas–Mettler–Look
- 2021–: Stade Rochelais Charente-Maritime

Annabel Elizabeth Fisher (born 19 September 1989) is a British professional racing cyclist, who lives in Switzerland and currently rides for The Café du Cycliste Gravel Team. In October 2020, she rode in the women's edition of the 2020 Liège–Bastogne–Liège race in Belgium.
