= Sae Hatakeyama =

Japanese BMX rider (born 1999)

Personal information
- Born: 7 June 1999 (age 27) Kanagawa Prefecture, Japan

Cycling career
- Sport: Cycling
- Current team: Red Bull
- Discipline: BMX racing
- Role: Rider
Medal record
Representing Japan
Women's BMX racing
Asian Games
Gold medal – first place	2026 Aichi–Nagoya	BMX racing

Sae Hatakeyama (born 7 June 1999) is a Japanese BMX rider. She competed in the women's race at the 2020 Summer Olympics. On her first run, she crashed and broke her collarbone, forcing her to drop out. In 2026, she became the first Japanese woman to win the gold medal in the discipline at the Asian Games.
