= Jin Zhiheng =

Chinese cyclist (born 2004)

Personal information
- Born: 26 February 2004 (age 22)

Cycling career
- Sport: Cycling
- Discipline: Track cycling
- Role: Rider
- Rider type: Sprinter
Medal record
Men's track cycling
Representing China
World Championships
Bronze medal – third place	2026 Shanghai	Team sprint
Asian Championships
Gold medal – first place	2026 Tagaytay	Team sprint
Bronze medal – third place	2024 New Delhi	Team sprint
Asian Games
Gold medal – first place	2026 Aichi–Nagoya	Team sprint

Jin Zhiheng (Chinese: 金智恒; born 26 February 2004) is a Chinese track cyclist who competes in sprinting events.

== Career ==
In September 2026, he competed at the 2026 Asian Games and won a gold medal in the team sprint with an Asian Games record time of 42.152 seconds. Weeks later she competed at the 2026 UCI Track Cycling World Championships and won a bronze medal in the team sprint event with a time of 42.389 seconds. This was China's first ever medal in the event at the UCI Track Cycling World Championships.
