= Samah Khaled =

Jordanian cyclist

Personal information
- Full name: Samah Khaled
- Born: 1 May 1992 (age 34) Jordan
- Height: 160 cm (5 ft 3 in)
- Weight: 60 kg (132 lb)

Cycling career
- Sport: Cycling
- Discipline: Road
- Role: Rider

Samah Khaled (Arabic: سماح خالد; born 1 May 1992) is a Jordanian racing cyclist. She has won 2 UCI events, gold at the 2011 Arab Games and placed third in the 2020 Dubai Women's Tour.

== Career ==
In 2011, Khaled competed at the 2011 Arab Games in Doha, Qatar, winning gold. She was named Sportswoman of the Year in 2011 by the Jordan Olympic Committee.

Khaled competed in the 2013 UCI women's road race and time trial in Florence. She also competed at the 2014 Asian Games in Incheon, South Korea.

In 2018, Khaled won the Union Cycliste Internationale (UCI) Gran Fondo World Series in Dubai. In 2019, Khaled won the 100 km Dubai 92 Cycle Challenge and won the fourth Ride Ajman women's event. In 2020, Khaled came third in the Dubai Women's Tour, placing first in the second stage and picking up a 15-second bonus.

Khaled joined Dubai Police Force as a Police trainer in February 2019. For the 2021 competitive season, she was due to compete with the Dubai Police team for its first season at UCI level. On 22 April 2021, Khaled tested positive for the anabolic steroid oxandrolone and received a doping ban by the UCI until June 2025. She retained her 2020 Dubai Women’s Tour result and participated in the 2023 UAE Tour Women event, while still under suspension.

Khaled returned to competition in June 2025, competing at the 2025 National Championships in Jordan, winning the event, and at the Internationale Oderrundfahrt (NAT) in Brandenburg, Germany.

Khaled has also represented the Bahrain national team.

== Major results ==
2020
3rd Overall Dubai Women's Tour

1st Stage 2
