= 2026 UCI Track Cycling World Championships =

- Venue: Shanghai, China
- Date: 14–18 October
- Velodrome: Shanghai Velodrome
- Nations participating: 45
- Cyclists participating: 379
- Events: 22

The 2026 UCI Track Cycling World Championships were the 123rd edition of the UCI Track Cycling World Championships and held from 14 to 18 October 2026, at the Shanghai Velodrome in Shanghai, China.

== Schedule ==
A total of 22 events were held, with 11 events each for men and women.

All times are local UTC+8.

Date	Time	Event
14 October	10:30	Women's team pursuit qualifying
14 October	10:30	Men's team pursuit qualifying
14 October	10:30	Women's team sprint qualifying
14 October	10:30	Men's team sprint qualifying
14 October	18:30	Women's team sprint first round
14 October	18:30	Men's team sprint first round
14 October	18:30	Women's scratch
14 October	18:30	Men's team pursuit first round
14 October	18:30	Women's team sprint finals
14 October	18:30	Men's team sprint finals
15 October	12:00	Men's keirin first round
15 October	12:00	Women's sprint qualifying
15 October	12:00	Men's keirin repechages
15 October	12:00	Women's sprint 1/16 final
15 October	12:00	Men's keirin quarterfinals
15 October	12:00	Women's sprint 1/8 final
15 October	17:00	Women's team pursuit first round
15 October	17:00	Women's sprint quarterfinals
15 October	17:00	Men's keirin semifinals
15 October	17:00	Men's team pursuit finals
15 October	17:00	Women's elimination race
15 October	17:00	Men's keirin finals
15 October	17:00	Men's scratch
15 October	17:00	Women's team pursuit finals
16 October	12:00	Men's time trial qualifying
16 October	12:00	Women's omnium scratch race
16 October	12:00	Men's individual pursuit qualifying
16 October	12:00	Women's omnium tempo race
16 October	17:00	Men's points race
16 October	17:00	Women's sprint semifinals
16 October	17:00	Women's omnium elimination race
16 October	17:00	Men's time trial final
16 October	17:00	Men's individual pursuit finals
16 October	17:00	Women's sprint finals
16 October	17:00	Women's omnium points race

Date	Time	Event
17 October	11:00	Women's time trial qualifying
17 October	11:00	Men's sprint qualifying
17 October	11:00	Men's omnium scratch race
17 October	11:00	Men's sprint 1/16 final
17 October	11:00	Women's individual pursuit qualifying
17 October	11:00	Men's sprint 1/8 final
17 October	11:00	Men's omnium tempo race
17 October	17:30	Women's time trial final
17 October	17:30	Men's sprint quarterfinals
17 October	17:30	Women's madison
17 October	17:30	Men's omnium elimination race
17 October	17:30	Women's individual pursuit finals
17 October	17:30	Men's omnium points race
18 October	11:00	Men's sprint semifinals
18 October	11:00	Women's keirin first round
18 October	11:00	Women's keirin repechages
18 October	13:30	Women's keirin quarterfinals
18 October	13:30	Men's sprint finals
18 October	13:30	Women's points race
18 October	13:30	Women's keirin semifinals
18 October	13:30	Men's elimination race
18 October	13:30	Women's keirin finals
18 October	13:30	Men's madison

== Medal summary ==
Events with a grey background are non-Olympic events.

=== Medal table ===
* Host nation (China)

Rank	Nation	Gold	Silver	Bronze	Total
1	Great Britain	6	3	3	12
2	Netherlands	5	1	1	7
3	Denmark	2	3	1	6
4	Germany	2	2	5	9
5	China*	2	0	1	3
6	Italy	1	2	1	4
7	Belgium	1	1	3	5
8	Portugal	1	1	2	4
9	Ireland	1	1	0	2
–	Individual Neutral Athletes	1	0	0	1
10	France	0	3	0	3
11	Japan	0	2	4	6
12	Australia	0	2	0	2
13	New Zealand	0	1	0	1
14	United States	0	0	1	1
Totals (14 entries)		22	22	22	66

=== Men ===
Event	Gold	Silver	Bronze
Individual pursuit	Jonathan Milan; Italy	Frederik Madsen; Denmark	Filippo Ganna; Italy
Team pursuit	Denmark; Carl-Frederik Bévort; Lasse Norman Leth; Frederik Madsen; Rasmus Pedersen; Tobias Hansen	Italy; Filippo Ganna; Francesco Lamon; Alessio Magagnotti; Jonathan Milan	Great Britain; Henry Hobbs; Noah Hobbs; Ethan Vernon; Oliver Wood; Matthew Bostock
Sprint	Harrie Lavreysen; Netherlands	Leigh Hoffman; Australia	Kaiya Ota; Japan
Team sprint	Netherlands; Jeffrey Hoogland; Harrie Lavreysen; Roy van den Berg	Australia; Daniel Barber; Ryan Elliott; Leigh Hoffman	China; Jin Zhiheng; Li Zhiwei; Liu Qi
Keirin	Harrie Lavreysen; Netherlands	Maximilian Dörnbach; Germany	Shinji Nakano; Japan
Madison	Denmark; Carl-Frederik Bévort; Lasse Norman Leth	Portugal; Iúri Leitão; Ivo Oliveira	Germany; Moritz Augenstein; Roger Kluge
Omnium	Iúri Leitão; Portugal	Fabio Van Den Bossche; Belgium	Tim Torn Teutenberg; Germany
Scratch	Matthew Bostock; Great Britain	Tom Sexton; New Zealand	Lindsay De Vylder; Belgium
Points race	Mark Stewart; Great Britain	Benjamin Thomas; France	Carlos Salgueiro; Portugal
Elimination	Tim Torn Teutenberg; Germany	Tobias Hansen; Denmark	Jules Hesters; Belgium
1 km time trial	Jeffrey Hoogland; Netherlands	Étienne Oliviero; France	Joseph Truman; Great Britain

=== Women ===
Event	Gold	Silver	Bronze
Individual pursuit	Millie Couzens; Great Britain	Josie Knight; Great Britain	Lisa Klein; Germany
Team pursuit	Great Britain; Erin Boothman; Millie Couzens; Josie Knight; Anna Morris; Megan Barker	Italy; Elisa Balsamo; Chiara Consonni; Martina Fidanza; Vittoria Guazzini; Martina Alzini	Germany; Franziska Brauße; Messane Bräutigam; Lisa Klein; Mieke Kröger
Sprint	Yuan Liying; China	Emma Finucane; Great Britain	Mina Sato; Japan
Team sprint	China; Jiang Yulu; Tong Mengqi; Yuan Liying; Luo Xuehuang	Great Britain; Sophie Capewell; Emma Finucane; Rhianna Parris-Smith	Germany; Lea Friedrich; Pauline Grabosch; Clara Schneider
Keirin	Alina Lysenko; Individual Neutral Athletes	Lea Friedrich; Germany	Emma Finucane; Great Britain
Madison	Great Britain; Erin Boothman; Anna Morris	France; Marion Borras; Clara Copponi	Japan; Maho Kakita; Tsuyaka Uchino
Omnium	Anna Morris; Great Britain	Tsuyaka Uchino; Japan	Amalie Dideriksen; Denmark
Scratch	Lorena Wiebes; Netherlands	Lara Gillespie; Ireland	Maria Martins; Portugal
Points race	Lara Gillespie; Ireland	Amalie Dideriksen; Denmark	Shari Bossuyt; Belgium
Elimination	Lotte Kopecky; Belgium	Yumi Kajihara; Japan	Megan Jastrab; United States
1 km time trial	Pauline Grabosch; Germany	Hetty van de Wouw; Netherlands	Sofie van Rooijen; Netherlands
