= Dubai Women's Tour =

Dubai professional road bicycle racing event

Race details
- Date: February
- Region: Dubai
- Discipline: Road
- Competition: UCI 2.2 (2020–)
- Type: Stage race

History
- First edition: 2020
- Editions: 1 (as of 2020)
- First winner: Lucy van der Haar (GBR)
- Most recent: Lucy van der Haar (GBR)

The Dubai Women's Tour is an annual professional road bicycle racing event for women in Dubai.

== History ==
The Dubai Women’s Tour is a professional women’s road‑cycling stage race held in Dubai. It was first held in 2020, and is classified as a UCI 2.2 event. The race typically runs over four stages, and includes different terrain types (flat stages, perhaps some more challenging segments) that test sprinting ability, endurance, and climbing, although the inaugural edition had mostly flat stages. The event is distinct from, but related in spirit to, the UAE Tour Women, which is a higher‑profile race in the UCI Women’s WorldTour starting in Dubai and going through other parts of the UAE.

== Types of stages in Dubai Women's Tour ==
- Flat / Sprint Stages

Mostly level terrain, little to no significant climbs.

Favor fast riders and sprinters.

Features might include wide, straight roads, sometimes crosswinds.

Examples: In 2025, Stages 1, 2, and 4 of the UAE Tour Women were flat.

- Mountain / Summit Finish Stages

Include substantial climbs, often finishing on a steep slope or mountain top.

Key tests for general classification contenders.

Example: Stage 3 in 2025 to Jebel Hafeet.

- Individual Time Trial (ITT)

Riders race alone against the clock rather than in a peloton.

Usually on flat or gently rolling terrain; course designed to be fast.

Example: There’s been a 12.2 km ITT in some editions (although not always in every “Dubai Women’s Tour” setup, but seen in the broader UAE Tour setup)

=== Other classifications / jerseys ===
Besides types of stages, these tours also include classifications that riders compete for:

- General Classification (GC): Based on overall time across all stages.
- Points Classification (Sprint Points): Points awarded for high finishes in stages and intermediate sprints.
- Mountains Classification: Points awarded for climbing performance on designated uphill segments or summit finishes.
- Young Rider Classification: For the best-placed younger riders (e.g. under 25).
- Sometimes Intermediate Sprints or Sprint Points Jerseys are also separately recognized.

== Winners ==
Year	Country	Rider	Team
2020	Great Britain	Lucy van der Haar	Hitec Products–Birk Sport

== Classification leaders jerseys ==
Classification	2020
General	
Sprints	
Mountains	
Youth	
Team	
