= Fadhil Zonis =

Malaysian cyclist (born 1997)

Muhammad Fadhil Mohd Zonis
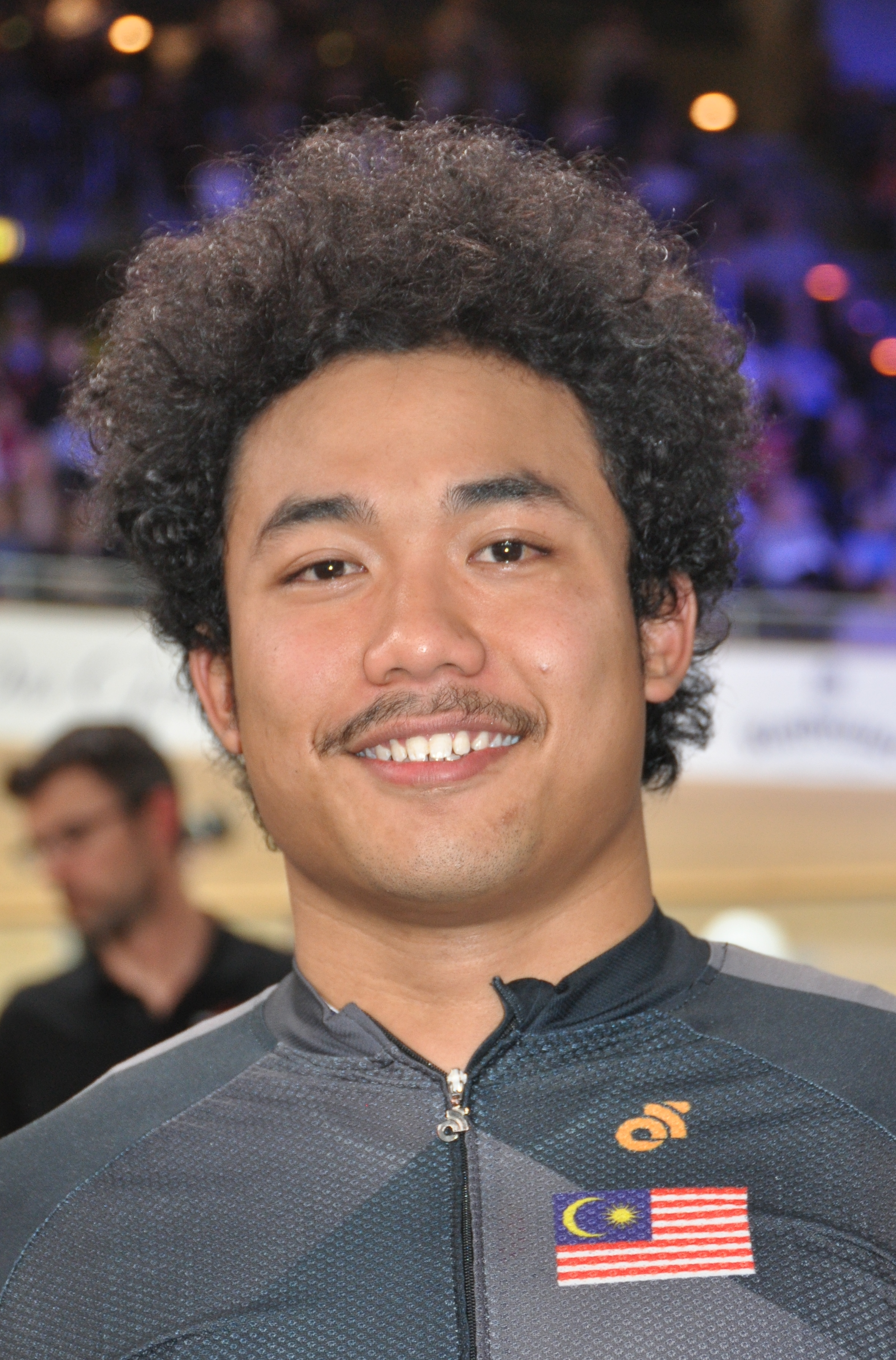
- Zonis at the 2020 UCI Track Cycling World Championships

Personal information
- Full name: Muhammad Fadhil bin Mohammad Zonis
- Born: 3 December 1997 (age 28) Kuala Selangor, Selangor, Malaysia
- Height: 1.74 m (5 ft 9 in)
- Weight: 67 kg (148 lb)

Cycling career
- Sport: Cycling
- Discipline: Track
- Role: Rider
- Rider type: Sprinter
Medal record
Representing Malaysia
Event	1st	2nd	3rd
Asian Games	0	1	1
Asian Championships	1	3	3
SEA Games	1	1	0
Total	2	5	4
Men's track cycling
Asian Games
Silver medal – second place	2018 Jakarta-Palembang	Team sprint
Bronze medal – third place	2022 Hangzhou	Team sprint
Asian Championships
Gold medal – first place	2023 Nilai	1km time trial
Silver medal – second place	2020 Jincheon	1km time trial
Silver medal – second place	2022 New Delhi	1km time trial
Silver medal – second place	2022 New Delhi	Team Sprint
Silver medal – second place	2024 New Delhi	Team sprint
Bronze medal – third place	2019 Jakarta	Team sprint
Bronze medal – third place	2023 Nilai	Team Sprint
Bronze medal – third place	2025 Nilai	Team sprint
SEA Games
Gold medal – first place	2017 Kuala Lumpur	1km time trial
Silver medal – second place	2017 Kuala Lumpur	Team sprint

Muhammad Fadhil bin Mohammad Zonis (born 3 December 1997) is a Malaysian professional track cyclist, who specializes in sprinting events.

== See also ==
- List of Malaysian records in track cycling
