= Cycling at the 2026 Asian Games – Men's team pursuit =

Men's team pursuit at the 2026 Asian Games
- Venue: Izu Velodrome
- Dates: 29–30 September 2026
- Competitors: 34 from 7 nations

Medalists
gold medal	China; Pei Zhengyu; Sun Wentao; Wu Junjie; Yang Yang; Sun Haijiao
silver medal	Japan; Naoki Kojima; Kazushige Kuboki; Shoi Matsuda; Kanta Umezawa; Shoki Kawano
bronze medal	South Korea; Hong Seung-min; Kim Hyeon-seok; Min Kyeong-ho; Park Sang-hoon; Lee Jin-gu

The men's team pursuit event at the 2026 Asian Games was held on 29 and 30 September 2026.

== Schedule ==
All times are Japan Standard Time (UTC+09:00)

Date	Time	Event
Tuesday, 29 September 2026	11:17	Qualifying
Tuesday, 29 September 2026	15:45	First round
Wednesday, 30 September 2026	15:42	Finals

== Records ==
Prior to this competition, the existing world, Asian and Games records were as follows.

World Record	Denmark	3:39.977	Konya, Turkey	2 February 2026
Asian Record	Japan	3:48.127	Hong Kong, China	15 March 2024
Games Record	Japan	3:52.757	Hangzhou, China	27 September 2023

== Results ==
Legend

- Overtaking — Caught and passed the opposing team

=== Qualifying ===
The seven fastest teams will qualify and be matched in the First Round as follows:

- The 7th fastest team start alone against the clock.
- The 5th fastest team against the 6th fastest team.
- The 2nd fastest team against the 3rd fastest team.
- The fastest team against the 4th fastest team.

Rank	Team	Time	Notes
1	Japan (JPN); Shoi Matsuda; Kazushige Kuboki; Kanta Umezawa; Naoki Kojima	3:52.279	GR
2	China (CHN); Sun Wentao; Yang Yang; Wu Junjie; Pei Zhengyu	3:52.412	
3	Kazakhstan (KAZ); Ilya Karabutov; Maxim Khoroshavin; Ramis Dinmukhametov; Dmitriy Noskov	3:54.001	
4	South Korea (KOR); Park Sang-hoon; Lee Jin-gu; Kim Hyeon-seok; Min Kyeong-ho	3:58.338	
5	Hong Kong (HKG); Chu Tsun Wai; Mow Ching Yin; Ng Pak Hang; Tso Kai Kwong	4:00.587	
6	Chinese Taipei (TPE); Li Jing-feng; Chang Chih-sheng; Tu Chih-hao; Xu Shi-ru	4:02.895	
7	Indonesia (INA); Bernard Benyamin Van Aert; Terry Yudha Kusuma; Julian Abi Manyu; Muhammad Andy Royan	4:14.524	

=== First round ===
Progression rule::

- The winners of heats 3 and 4 in the First Round ride the final for the gold and silver medals.
- The remaining five teams will be ranked by their times in the First Round and will be paired as follows:
- The two fastest teams ride the final for the bronze medal.

==== Heat 1 ====
Rank	Team	Time	Notes
1	Indonesia (INA); Bernard Benyamin Van Aert; Terry Yudha Kusuma; Julian Abi Manyu; Muhammad Andy Royan	4:07.250	

==== Heat 2 ====
Rank	Team	Time	Notes
1	Hong Kong (HKG); Chu Tsun Wai; Mow Ching Yin; Ng Pak Hang; Tso Kai Kwong	3:57.641	
2	Chinese Taipei (TPE); Li Jing-feng; Chang Chih-sheng; Chien Yun-tse; Xu Shi-ru	3:59.024	

==== Heat 3 ====
Rank	Team	Time	Notes
1	China (CHN); Sun Haijiao; Yang Yang; Wu Junjie; Pei Zhengyu	3:49.845	QG, GR
2	Kazakhstan (KAZ); Ilya Karabutov; Alisher Zhumakan; Ramis Dinmukhametov; Dmitriy Noskov	3:51.589	QB

==== Heat 4 ====
Rank	Team	Time	Notes
1	Japan (JPN); Shoki Kawano; Kazushige Kuboki; Kanta Umezawa; Naoki Kojima	Overtaking	QG
2	South Korea (KOR); Park Sang-hoon; Hong Seung-min; Kim Hyeon-seok; Min Kyeong-ho	3:56.518	QB

=== Finals ===
==== Bronze ====
Rank	Team	Time	Notes
3rd place, bronze medalist(s)	South Korea (KOR); Park Sang-hoon; Hong Seung-min; Kim Hyeon-seok; Min Kyeong-ho	3:55.933	
4	Kazakhstan (KAZ); Ilya Karabutov; Alisher Zhumakan; Maxim Khoroshavin; Dmitriy Noskov	3:58.718	

==== Gold ====
Rank	Team	Time	Notes
1st place, gold medalist(s)	China (CHN); Sun Wentao; Yang Yang; Wu Junjie; Pei Zhengyu	3:47.621	GR
2nd place, silver medalist(s)	Japan (JPN); Shoi Matsuda; Kazushige Kuboki; Kanta Umezawa; Naoki Kojima	3:49.005	

== Non-participating riders ==
The following rider was entered in the event but did not compete in any round:

- Ma Yik Fei (HKG)
