= Luo Xuehuang =

Chinese cyclist (born 2005)

Personal information
- Born: 29 September 2005 (age 21)

Cycling career
- Sport: Cycling
- Discipline: Track cycling
- Role: Rider
- Rider type: Sprinter
Medal record
Women's track cycling
Representing China
World Championships
Gold medal – first place	2026 Shanghai	Team sprint
Asian Games
Gold medal – first place	2026 Aichi–Nagoya	Team sprint
Asian Championships
Gold medal – first place	2026 Tagaytay	Team sprint
Gold medal – first place	2026 Tagaytay	1 кm time trial
World Junior Championships
Gold medal – first place	2023 Cali	Time trial
Gold medal – first place	2023 Cali	Team sprint
Bronze medal – third place	2023 Cali	Sprint

Luo Xuehuang (Chinese: 罗雪凰; born 29 September 2005) is a Chinese track cyclist who competes in sprinting events. She is a World Championships and Asian Cycling Championships gold medalist.

== Career ==
Luo competed at the 2023 UCI Junior Track Cycling World Championships and won gold medals in the team sprint and time trial events, and a bronze medal in the sprint event.

In March 2026, she competed at the 2026 Asian Track Cycling Championships and won a gold medal in the team sprint event. She also won a gold medal in the 1 km time trial with an Asian record time of 1:05.120. In September 2026, she competed at the 2026 Asian Games and won a gold medal in the team sprint with an Asian Games record time of 45.370 seconds. Weeks later she competed at the 2026 UCI Track Cycling World Championships and won a gold medal in the team sprint event with a time of 45.578 seconds. This was China's first gold medal in the event at the UCI Track Cycling World Championships since 2015.
