= Kim Hyeon-seok =

South Korean cyclist (born 1995)

Personal information
- Full name: Kim Hyeon-seok
- Born: 18 August 1995 (age 31)

Cycling career
- Sport: Cycling
- Disciplines: Road, Track
- Role: Rider

Professional teams
- 2014–2016: KSPO
- 2018–2019: Seoul Cycling Team
- 2020–2024: KTX Korail Cycling Team
Medal record
Representing South Korea
Men's track cycling
Asian Games
Bronze medal – third place	2022 Hangzhou	Team pursuit
Bronze medal – third place	2026 Aichi–Nagoya	Team pursuit
Asian Championships
Gold medal – first place	2025 Nilai	Team pursuit
Bronze medal – third place	2024 New Delhi	Scratch
Bronze medal – third place	2026 Tagaytay	Team pursuit

Kim Hyeon-seok (Korean: 김현석; born 18 August 1995) is a South Korean racing cyclist. He competes in both road and track cycling, and has ridden for Korail Cycling Team.

== Biography ==
Kim Hyeon-seok was born in August 1995. He began cycling at the end of his first year of high school on the recommendation of his father.

After progressing through the junior ranks, he joined the continental team KSPO in 2014 for his first season in the under-23 category. A fast sprinter, he finished fifth on the final stage of the Tour de Hokkaido and eighth in the South Korean national road race championships. In 2015, he finished seventh on a stage of the Tour of Thailand and eighth on a stage of the Tour de Korea. Since 2020, he has competed for Korail. He has also represented South Korea in international track cycling competitions. At the 2022 Asian Games, held in 2023, he won the bronze medal in the team pursuit. At the 2024 Asian Track Cycling Championships in New Delhi, he won the bronze medal in the scratch race.

== Major results ==
2023
(bronze) Team pursuit, 2022 Asian Games (held in 2023)
(bronze) Omnium, South Korean National Track Championships

2024
(silver) Omnium, South Korean National Track Championships
(bronze) Scratch, Asian Track Cycling Championships

2025
(gold) Team pursuit, Asian Track Cycling Championships
(gold) Madison, South Korean National Track Championships
(silver) Team pursuit, South Korean National Track Championships

2026
(bronze) Team pursuit, Asian Track Cycling Championships
(bronze) Team pursuit, 2026 Asian Games
