= Chutikan Kitwanitsathian =

Thai BMX Rider (born 1998)

Personal information
- Born: 9 October 1998 (age 28)

Cycling career
- Sport: Cycling
- Discipline: BMX racing
- Role: Rider

Chutikan Kitwanitsathian (born 9 October 1998) is a Thai BMX rider. She competed in the women's race at the 2020 Summer Olympics.
