= Choi Tae-ho =

South Korean cyclist (born 2007)

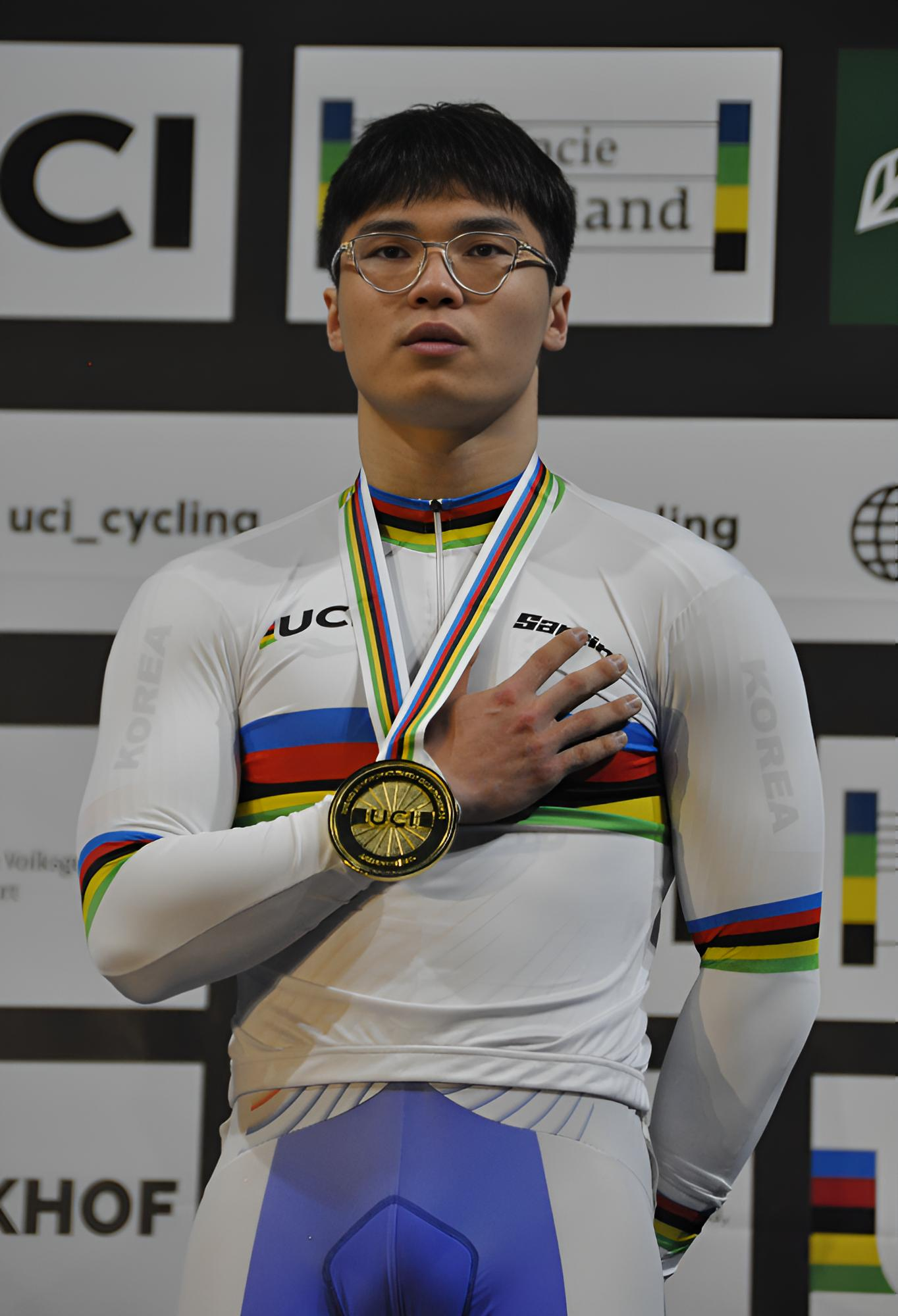
- Tae-ho at the 2025 UCI Junior Track Cycling World Championships

Personal information
- Born: 22 May 2007 (age 19)
- Height: 1.83 m (6 ft 0 in)
- Weight: 88 kg (194 lb)

Cycling career
- Sport: Cycling
- Discipline: Track
- Rider type: Sprinter
Medal record
Representing South Korea
Men's track cycling
World Junior Championships
Gold medal – first place	2025 Apeldoorn	Sprint
Gold medal – first place	2025 Apeldoorn	Keirin
Bronze medal – third place	2024 Luoyang	Sprint

Choi Tae-ho (born 22 May 2007) is a South Korean track cyclist. He won two gold medals at the 2025 UCI Junior Track Cycling World Championships, and is considered one of Korea's best cycling prospects.

== Career ==
Choi was a competitive skier at a young age, but transitioned to cycling on a coach's recommendation. His family moved to Australia for better training opportunities, then to New Zealand where Choi worked with coach John Andrews, father of two-time Olympic gold medalist Ellesse Andrews.

In 2025, at 18 years old, Choi was selected to the senior national team for the UCI world championships, the youngest participant for South Korea since 1979. He finished 18th in the 1km time trial, setting a national record of 1:00.465.

== Major results ==
=== Track ===
2024
3rd Sprint, Junior World Championships
2025
Junior World Championships

1st Sprint
1st Keirin
