= Kaiya Ota =

Japanese cyclist (born 1999)

Personal information
- Born: 27 July 1999 (age 27) Okayama, Japan
- Height: 1.74 m (5 ft 9 in)
- Weight: 78 kg (172 lb)

Cycling career
- Sport: Cycling
- Discipline: Track cycling
- Role: Rider
Medal record
Men's track cycling
Representing Japan
Event	1st	2nd	3rd
World Championships	0	0	3
Asian Games	3	1	0
Asian Championships	5	2	1
Total	8	3	4
World Championships
Bronze medal – third place	2024 Ballerup	Sprint
Bronze medal – third place	2024 Ballerup	Team sprint
Bronze medal – third place	2026 Shanghai	Sprint
Asian Games
Gold medal – first place	2022 Hangzhou	Sprint
Gold medal – first place	2022 Hangzhou	Team sprint
Gold medal – first place	2026 Aichi–Nagoya	Sprint
Silver medal – second place	2026 Aichi–Nagoya	Team sprint
Asian Championships
Gold medal – first place	2022 New Delhi	Team sprint
Gold medal – first place	2023 Nilai	Team sprint
Gold medal – first place	2025 Nilai	Sprint
Gold medal – first place	2025 Nilai	Team sprint
Gold medal – first place	2026 Tagaytay	Sprint
Silver medal – second place	2023 Nilai	Sprint
Silver medal – second place	2026 Tagaytay	Team sprint
Bronze medal – third place	2025 Nilai	Keirin

Kaiya Ota (太田海也, Ōta Kaiya; born 27 July 1999) is a Japanese track cyclist. He is also active in Japan as a keirin cyclist representing the Okayama branch of the Japan Keirin Association.

== Biography ==
=== Pre-university years ===
After entering the Okayama Prefectural Bizen Ryokuyo High School, Ota began rowing. In 2017, as a third-year high school student, he won the double sculls event at the National High School Athletic Meet, and also achieved second place finishes in the single sculls event at the National High School Rowing Championships and the quadruple sculls event at the (former) National Sports Festival Rowing Competition (now Rowing Competition).

After graduating from high school, he enrolled in Nihon University. He continued rowing, but his performance did not improve due to his small stature and he gave up the sport due to lower back pain, and he also dropped out of university after one year. He then returned to his hometown of Okayama and got a job at a cycle shop after going there to buy a bicycle. The owner of the cycle shop suggested that he participate in a bicycle race as a way to promote the shop, and after winning that competition, he decided to aim to become a professional keirin racer. A friend's father was former racer Eiji Tanaka (66th class), and through that, he was introduced to Masahiro Fujita, who would later become his mentor.

=== Cycling career ===
In January 2021, Ota passed the entrance examination for the 121st class of trainee athletes at the training school. He attended the entrance ceremony at the training school on May 27 and won the Golden Cap at the first record trial held in June. As a result, he was recognized by the training school as a candidate for early graduation. He also won the Golden Cap at the second record trial held in September. In addition, he achieved excellent results in the race training while at the school, clearing the requirements for early graduation. And because he expressed his intention to graduate early, he was allowed to take the Keirin racer qualification examination in December, which he also passed. On December 17, he was recognized as one of the first early graduates of the training school since Kohei Terazaki and Takehito Kikuchi (both from the 117th class), along with his classmate Shinji Nakano. An early graduation certificate presentation ceremony was held on the 22nd, and he graduated from the training school before the end of the year, ahead of his classmates.

Ota (left) in the men's sprint 1/32 finals race at the 2024 Summer Olympics.

While still a student at the training school, he fell and fractured his right collarbone during a race at the 90th All Japan Cycling Championships (Izu Velodrome) held from December 10 to 13. Initially, his debut was undecided, but after recovering from his injury, he made his debut on January 20, 2022, at the Kokura FII (Midnight) and achieved his first victory in his debut race. He then went on to win three consecutive races at the same venue, Beppu FII (Morning), and Kurume FII (Night), earning a special promotion to Class A2 on February 18. However, at the Tamano FII (Midnight), his first race after being promoted to Class A2, he won on the first day but the race was canceled from the second day onward. His chances of achieving 18 consecutive wins and being promoted to Class S were dashed.

His abilities, demonstrated by graduating early from the training school, were recognized, and in January 2022, he was designated as a "B" (Academy) track sprint強化選手 (strengthening program athlete) by the Japan Cycling Federation. As a result, he has since focused on competitive cycling.

On February 26, 2023, he won his first silver medal in the men's sprint on the fourth day of the 2023 UCI Track Nations Cup, Round 1 (Jakarta). Subsequently, on March 17, he won a bronze medal in the men's keirin on the third day of Round 2 (Cairo). On March 18, he won another bronze medal in the men's sprint on the fourth day. He made his GI debut at the All-Star in August. He was selected for the Prince Tomohito Cup in October and the Keirin Festival in November, reaching the finals in his third GI appearance. On December 28, he won the Young Grand Prix held at Tachikawa Velodrome, earning his first special keirin title.

In the cycling events at the 2024 Paris Olympics, he competed in the men's team sprint with Yoshitaka Nagasako and Yuta Ohara, losing to France and going to the fifth-place playoff, where he beat Germany with a time of 42.078 seconds, setting a new Japanese record, to finish in fifth place. In the men's sprint, he lost to a British rider in the quarterfinals and went to the classification race, where he ultimately finished in seventh place. In the men's keirin, he advanced to the semifinals but was disqualified for obstructing another rider's path, and was also disqualified because he had received a warning in the sprint event.
