= Cycling at the 2026 Asian Games – Women's team sprint =

Women's team sprint at the 2026 Asian Games
- Venue: Izu Velodrome
- Dates: 29 September 2026
- Competitors: 24 from 6 nations

Medalists
gold medal	China; Jiang Yulu; Luo Xuehuang; Yuan Liying; Wang Lijuan
silver medal	Malaysia; Nurul Aliana Syafika Azizan; Nurul Izzah Izzati Asri; Anis Amira Rosidi; Nur Alyssa Mohd Farid
bronze medal	Chinese Taipei; Chen Ching-yun; Liu Shang-ying; Wang Sin-ting

The women's team sprint event at the 2026 Asian Games was held on 29 September 2026.

== Schedule ==
All times are Japan Standard Time (UTC+09:00)

Date	Time	Event
Tuesday, 29 September 2026	10:00	Qualifying
Tuesday, 29 September 2026	15:00	First round
Tuesday, 29 September 2026	16:13	Finals

== Records ==
Prior to this competition, the existing world, Asian and Games records were as follows.

World Record	United Kingdom	45.186	Saint-Quentin-en-Yvelines, France	5 August 2024
Asian Record	China	45.487	Luoyang, China	26 June 2024
Games Record	China	46.376	Hangzhou, China	26 September 2023

== Results ==
=== Qualifying ===
Six teams are seeded for the First Round based on their qualifying time as follows:

- The 4th fastest team against the 6th fastest team.
- The 3rd fastest team against the 5th fastest team.
- The 2nd fastest team start alone against the clock.
- The fastest team start alone against the clock.

Rank	Team	Time	Notes
1	China (CHN); Luo Xuehuang; Jiang Yulu; Wang Lijuan	46.672	
2	Malaysia (MAS); Nurul Aliana Syafika Azizan; Nurul Izzah Izzati Asri; Nur Alyssa Mohd Farid	48.187	
3	Japan (JPN); Aki Sakai; Mina Sato; Haruka Nakazawa	49.843	
4	Chinese Taipei (TPE); Wang Sin-ting; Chen Ching-yun; Liu Shang-ying	49.860	
5	Hong Kong (HKG); Ching Yin Shan; Yeung Cho Yiu; Tung Phoebe	50.298	
6	India (IND); Celestina Chelobroy; Sarita Kumari; Keerthi Rangaswamy Chikka	50.414	

=== First round ===
The fastest two winning teams race for the gold and silver medals, and the other two winning teams race for the bronze medal. Others are ranked 5th-6th places based on the time in the First Round.

==== Heat 1 ====
Rank	Team	Time	Notes
1	Chinese Taipei (TPE); Wang Sin-ting; Chen Ching-yun; Liu Shang-ying	49.504	QB
2	India (IND); Celestina Chelobroy; Sarita Kumari; Keerthi Rangaswamy Chikka	50.431	

==== Heat 2 ====
Rank	Team	Time	Notes
1	Japan (JPN); Aki Sakai; Mina Sato; Minami Yamada	49.405	QB
2	Hong Kong (HKG); Ching Yin Shan; Yeung Cho Yiu; Ng Sze Wing	49.419	

==== Heat 3 ====
Rank	Team	Time	Notes
1	Malaysia (MAS); Nurul Aliana Syafika Azizan; Nurul Izzah Izzati Asri; Nur Alyssa Mohd Farid	48.023	QG

==== Heat 4 ====
Rank	Team	Time	Notes
1	China (CHN); Luo Xuehuang; Yuan Liying; Jiang Yulu	45.825	QG, GR

=== Finals ===
==== Bronze ====
Rank	Team	Time	Notes
3rd place, bronze medalist(s)	Chinese Taipei (TPE); Wang Sin-ting; Chen Ching-yun; Liu Shang-ying	49.061	
4	Japan (JPN); Aki Sakai; Mina Sato; Minami Yamada	49.137	

==== Gold ====
Rank	Team	Time	Notes
1st place, gold medalist(s)	China (CHN); Luo Xuehuang; Yuan Liying; Jiang Yulu	45.370	GR
2nd place, silver medalist(s)	Malaysia (MAS); Nurul Aliana Syafika Azizan; Nurul Izzah Izzati Asri; Anis Amira Rosidi	48.566	

== Non-participating riders ==
The following riders were entered in the event but did not compete in any round:

- Triyasha Paul (IND)
- Qiu Jing-wen (TPE)
