= Jiang Yulu =

Chinese cyclist (born 2004)

Personal information
- Born: 27 January 2004 (age 22)

Cycling career
- Sport: Cycling
- Discipline: Track cycling
- Role: Rider
- Rider type: Sprinter
Medal record
Women's track cycling
Representing China
World Championships
Gold medal – first place	2026 Shanghai	Team sprint
Asian Games
Gold medal – first place	2022 Hangzhou	Team sprint
Gold medal – first place	2026 Aichi–Nagoya	Team sprint
Bronze medal – third place	2026 Aichi–Nagoya	Sprint
Asian Championships
Gold medal – first place	2023 Nilai	500 m time trial

Jiang Yulu (Chinese: 蒋雨露; born 27 January 2004) is a Chinese track cyclist who competes in sprinting events. She won a gold medal at the 2026 UCI Track Cycling World Championships.

== Career ==
In September 2026, she competed at the 2026 Asian Games and won a gold medal in the team sprint with an Asian Games record time of 45.370 seconds. She also won a bronze medal in the sprint. Weeks later she competed at the 2026 UCI Track Cycling World Championships and won a gold medal in the team sprint event with a time of 45.578 seconds. This was China's first gold medal in the event at the UCI Track Cycling World Championships since 2015.
