= 2023 Asian Track Cycling Championships =

Cycling event in Malaysia

- Venue: Nilai, Malaysia
- Date: 14–19 June 2023
- Velodrome: Velodrom Nasional Malaysia

The 2023 Asian Track Cycling Championships (42nd edition) took place in Nilai, Malaysia from 14 to 19 June 2023.

== Medal summary ==
=== Men ===
Event	Gold	Silver	Bronze
Sprint	Azizulhasni Awang; Malaysia	Kaiya Ota; Japan	Kento Yamasaki; Japan
1 km time trial	Fadhil Zonis; Malaysia	Ronaldo Laitonjam; India	Choi Woo-rim; South Korea
Keirin	Azizulhasni Awang; Malaysia	Shinji Nakano; Japan	Shah Firdaus Sahrom; Malaysia
Individual pursuit	Kazushige Kuboki; Japan	Shoi Matsuda; Japan	Zhang Haiao; China
Points race	Naoki Kojima; Japan	Chang Chih-sheng; Chinese Taipei	Mow Ching Yin; Hong Kong
Scratch	Mohammad Ganjkhanloo; Iran	Shunsuke Imamura; Japan	Ruslan Yelyubayev; Kazakhstan
Elimination	Eiya Hashimoto; Japan	Ramis Dinmukhametov; Kazakhstan	Leung Chun Wing; Hong Kong
Omnium	Eiya Hashimoto; Japan	Artyom Zakharov; Kazakhstan	Park Sang-hoon; South Korea
Madison	Japan; Kazushige Kuboki; Shunsuke Imamura	Hong Kong; Leung Ka Yu; Leung Chun Wing	Indonesia; Bernard Van Aert; Terry Yudha Kusuma
Team sprint	Japan; Kaiya Ota; Yuta Obara; Yoshitaku Nagasako	China; Guo Shuai; Zhou Yu; Xue Chenxi	Malaysia; Fadhil Zonis; Ridwan Sahrom; Umar Hasbullah
Team pursuit	Japan; Eiya Hashimoto; Naoki Kojima; Shunsuke Imamura; Kazushige Kuboki; Shoi Matsuda	China; Yang Yang; Sun Wentao; Zhang Haiao; Sun Haijiao	Kazakhstan; Artyom Zakharov; Dmitriy Noskov; Alisher Zhumakan; Ramis Dinmukhametov

=== Women ===
Event	Gold	Silver	Bronze
Sprint	Riyu Ota; Japan	Mina Sato; Japan	Fuko Umekawa; Japan
500 m time trial	Jiang Yulu; China	Nurul Izzah Izzati Asri; Malaysia	Aki Sakai; Japan
Keirin	Mina Sato; Japan	Fuko Umekawa; Japan	Riyu Ota; Japan
Individual pursuit	Wei Suwan; China	Lee Ju-mi; South Korea	Maho Kakita; Japan
Points race	Liu Jiali; China	Olga Zabelinskaya; Uzbekistan	Mizuki Ikeda; Japan
Scratch	Yumi Kajihara; Japan	Liu Jiali; China	Lee Sze Wing; Hong Kong
Elimination	Tsuyaka Uchino; Japan	Yang Qianyu; Hong Kong	Huang Ting-ying; Chinese Taipei
Omnium	Yumi Kajihara; Japan	Lee Sze Wing; Hong Kong	Huang Ting-ying; Chinese Taipei
Madison	Japan; Yumi Kajihara; Tsuyaka Uchino	South Korea; Lee Ju-mi; Na Ah-reum	Uzbekistan; Olga Zabelinskaya; Nafosat Kozieva
Team sprint	China; Guo Yufang; Bao Shanju; Yuan Liying	Japan; Aki Sakai; Riyu Ota; Mina Sato; Fuko Umekawa	South Korea; Hwang Hyeon-seo; Lee Hye-jin; Cho Sun-young
Team pursuit	Japan; Yumi Kajihara; Mizuki Ikeda; Maho Kakita; Tsuyaka Uchino	China; Wang Susu; Zhang Hongjie; Wei Suwan; Wang Xiaoyue	South Korea; Shin Ji-eun; Lee Ju-mi; Na Ah-reum; Lee Eun-hee; Kang Hyun-kyung

== Medal table ==
Rank	Nation	Gold	Silver	Bronze	Total
1	Japan	14	7	6	27
2	China	4	4	1	9
3	Malaysia	3	1	2	6
4	Iran	1	0	0	1
5	Hong Kong	0	3	3	6
6	South Korea	0	2	4	6
7	Kazakhstan	0	2	2	4
8	Chinese Taipei	0	1	2	3
9	Uzbekistan	0	1	1	2
10	India	0	1	0	1
11	Indonesia	0	0	1	1
Totals (11 entries)		22	22	22	66
