= Yoshitaku Nagasako =

Japanese BMX racer (born 1993)

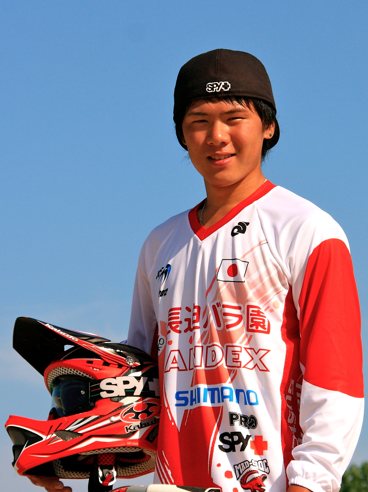
- Nagasako in 2012

Personal information
- Born: 16 September 1993 (age 33)

Cycling career
- Sport: Cycling
- Disciplines: BMX racing; Track
- Role: Rider
- Rider type: Sprinter (track)
Medal record
Representing Japan
Men's BMX racing
Asian Games
Gold medal – first place	2018 Jakarta-Palembang	Men's BMX race
Men's track cycling
World Championships
Bronze medal – third place	2024 Ballerup	Team sprint
Asian Games
Gold medal – first place	2022 Hangzhou	Team sprint
Silver medal – second place	2026 Aichi–Nagoya	Team sprint
Asian Championships
Gold medal – first place	2022 New Delhi	Team sprint
Gold medal – first place	2023 Nilai	Team sprint
Gold medal – first place	2025 Nilai	Team sprint
Silver medal – second place	2026 Tagaytay	Team sprint

Yoshitaku Nagasako (長迫 吉拓, Nagasako Yoshitaku; born 16 September 1993) is a Japanese track cyclist and BMX rider, representing his nation at international competitions. He competed in the time trial event at the 2015 UCI BMX World Championships.
