= Liu Qi (cyclist) =

Chinese cyclist

Personal information
- Born: 29 November 2000 (age 25) China

Cycling career
- Sport: Cycling
- Discipline: Track
Medal record
Men's track cycling
Representing China
World Championships
Bronze medal – third place	2026 Shanghai	Team sprint
Asian Games
Gold medal – first place	2026 Aichi–Nagoya	Team sprint
Silver medal – second place	2022 Hangzhou	Team sprint
Asian Championships
Silver medal – second place	2025 Nilai	Team sprint
Silver medal – second place	2025 Nilai	1 km time trial
Bronze medal – third place	2020 Jincheon	Time trial

Liu Qi (born 29 November 2000) is a Chinese cyclist. He competed in the men's sprint, men's team sprint, and men's keirin events at the 2024 Summer Olympics.
