= Ronaldo Laitonjam =

Indian track cyclist

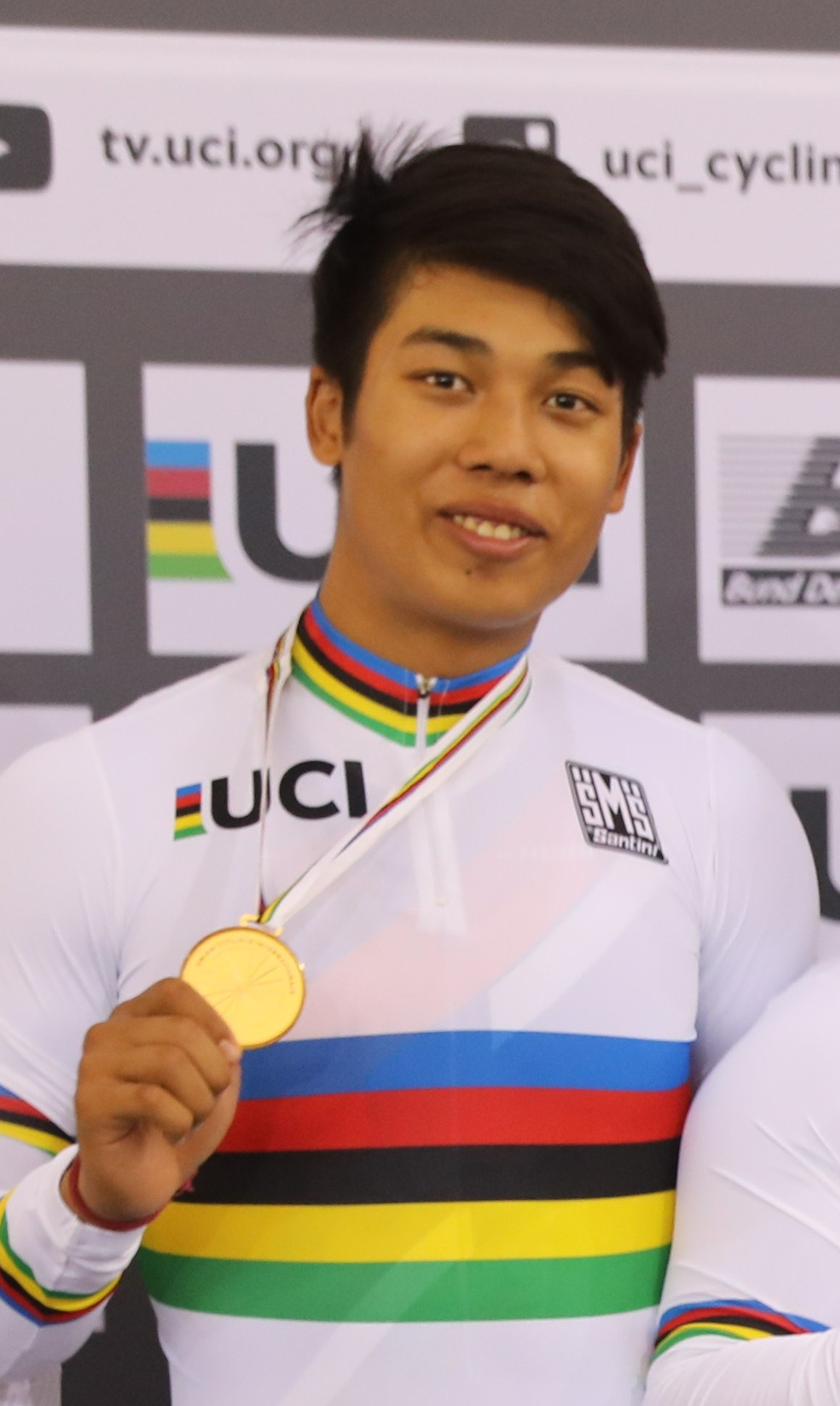
- Laitonjam in 2019

Personal information
- Full name: Ronaldo Laitonjam Singh
- Born: 22 April 2002 (age 24) Wangkhei, Imphal, Manipur, India
- Height: 6 ft 1 in (185 cm)
- Weight: 92 kg (203 lb)

Cycling career
- Sport: Cycling
- Discipline: Track
- Role: Rider
- Rider type: Sprinter
Medal record
Men's track cycling
Representing India
Asian Championships
Silver medal – second place	2022 New Delhi	Sprint
Silver medal – second place	2023 Nilai	1 km time trial
Bronze medal – third place	2022 New Delhi	Team sprint
Bronze medal – third place	2022 New Delhi	1 km time trial
Junior World Championships
Gold medal – first place	2019 Frankfurt	Team sprint

Ronaldo Laitonjam Singh (born 22 April 2002) is an Indian track cyclist, who competes in sprinting events.

== Career ==
He became the first Indian to win a medal at the Asian Cycling Championships. He has won three medals (1 silver and 2 bronze).

He has competed at the 2022 Commonwealth Games in the sprint, team sprint and 1 km time trial. He also competed at the 2021 and 2022 UCI Track Cycling World Championships. He finished second overall in the kilometer at the 2021 UCI Track Cycling Nations Cup.

== See also ==
- Cycling in India
