= 2025 Asian Track Cycling Championships =

Bicycle competition in Nilai, Malaysia

- Venue: Nilai, Malaysia
- Date: 21–27 February
- Velodrome: Velodrom Nasional Malaysia

The 2025 Asian Track Cycling Championships (44th edition) took place at the Velodrom Nasional Malaysia in Nilai, Malaysia from 21 to 27 February 2025.

== Medal summary ==
=== Men ===
Event	Gold	Silver	Bronze
Sprint	Kaiya Ota; Japan	Shinji Nakano; Japan	Muhammad Shah Firdaus Sahrom; Malaysia
1 km time trial	Ryuto Ichida; Japan	Liu Qi; China	Kirill Kurdidi; Kazakhstan
Keirin	Shinji Nakano; Japan	Muhammad Shah Firdaus Sahrom; Malaysia	Kaiya Ota; Japan
Individual pursuit	Kazushige Kuboki; Japan	Mohammad Al-Mutaiwei; United Arab Emirates	Min Kyeong-ho; South Korea
Points race	Tetsuo Yamamoto; Japan	Alisher Zhumakan; Kazakhstan	Mow Ching Yin; Hong Kong
Scratch	Dmitriy Bocharov; Uzbekistan	Kazushige Kuboki; Japan	Terry Yudha Kusuma; Indonesia
Elimination	Eiya Hashimoto; Japan	Park Sang-hoon; South Korea	Bernard Van Aert; Indonesia
Omnium	Naoki Kojima; Japan	Bernard Van Aert; Indonesia	Li Jing-feng; Chinese Taipei
Madison	Japan; Eiya Hashimoto; Kazushige Kuboki	South Korea; Kim Eu-ro; Park Sang-hoon	Indonesia; Terry Yudha Kusuma; Bernard Van Aert
Team sprint	Japan; Yoshitaku Nagasako; Kaiya Ota; Shinji Nakano	China; Tang Haoju; Feng Yusheng; Liu Qi; Zou Tianlong	Malaysia; Mohd Akmal Nazimi Jusena; Muhammad Ridwan Sahrom; Fadhil Zonis
Team pursuit	South Korea; Hong Seung-min; Park Sang-hoon; Kim Hyeon-seok; Min Kyeong-ho	Japan; Shoi Matsuda; Eiya Hashimoto; Naoki Kojima; Kazushige Kuboki; Tetsuo Yamamoto	Kazakhstan; Alisher Zhumakan; Dmitriy Noskov; Мaxim Khoroshavin; Ilya Karabutov

=== Women ===
Event	Gold	Silver	Bronze
Sprint	Mina Sato; Japan	Guo Yufang; China	Nurul Izzah Izzati Mohd Asri; Malaysia
1 кm time trial	Nurul Izzah Izzati Mohd Asri; Malaysia	Luo Shuyan; China	Hwang Hyeon-seo; South Korea
Keirin	Nurul Izzah Izzati Mohd Asri; Malaysia	Kim Ha-eun; South Korea	Guo Yufang; China
Individual pursuit	Maho Kakita; Japan	Shin Ji-eun; South Korea	Yeong Zhen Yi; Malaysia
Points race	Maho Kakita; Japan	Nur Aisyah Mohamad Zubir; Malaysia	Nafosat Kozieva; Uzbekistan
Scratch	Lee Sze Wing; Hong Kong	Nur Aisyah Mohamad Zubir; Malaysia	Ayana Mizutani; Japan
Elimination	Tsuyaka Uchino; Japan	Lee Sze Wing; Hong Kong	Jang Su-ji; South Korea
Omnium	Mizuki Ikeda; Japan	Lee Sze Wing; Hong Kong	Nafosat Kozieva; Uzbekistan
Madison	Japan; Yumi Kajihara; Tsuyaka Uchino	Hong Kong; Lee Sze Wing; Leung Wing Yee	Uzbekistan; Nafosat Kozieva; Asal Rizaeva
Team sprint	China; Bao Shanju; Guo Yufang; Luo Shuyan	Malaysia; Anis Amira Rosidi; Nurul Izzah Izzati Mohd Asri; Nur Alyssa Mohd Farid	Japan; Aki Sakai; Mina Sato; Haruka Nakazawa
Team pursuit	Japan; Mizuki Ikeda; Tsuyaka Uchino; Yumi Kajihara; Maho Kakita	South Korea; Shin Ji-eun; Jang Su-ji; Kim Min-jeong; Song Min-ji	Hong Kong; Lee Sze Wing; Leung Bo Yee; Leung Wing Yee; Yang Qianyu

== Medal table ==
Rank	Nation	Gold	Silver	Bronze	Total
1	Japan	16	3	3	22
2	Malaysia	2	4	4	10
3	South Korea	1	5	3	9
4	China	1	4	1	6
5	Hong Kong	1	3	2	6
6	Uzbekistan	1	0	3	4
7	Indonesia	0	1	3	4
8	Kazakhstan	0	1	2	3
9	United Arab Emirates	0	1	0	1
10	Chinese Taipei	0	0	1	1
Totals (10 entries)		22	22	22	66
