= Kirill Kurdidi =

Kazakhstani cyclist (born 2004)

Personal information
- Born: 19 June 2004 (age 22)

Cycling career
- Sport: Cycling
- Discipline: Track cycling
- Role: Rider
Medal record
Men's track cycling
Representing Kazakhstan
Gold medal – first place	2026 Tagaytay	1 km time trial
Bronze medal – third place	2025 Nilai	1 km time trial
Bronze medal – third place	2024 New Delhi	1 km time trial
World Junior Championships
Bronze medal – third place	2021 Cairo	1 km time trial

Kirill Kurdidi (born 19 June 2004) is a Kazakhstani male track cyclist. He won the gold medal in the 1 km time trial at the 2026 Asian Track Cycling Championships and is the Kazakhstan national record holder at the event.

== Career ==
Kurdidi won the bronze medal in the 1 km title trial at the 2021 UCI Junior Track Cycling World Championships in Cairo in September 2021.

In February 2024, he won the bronze medal in the 1 km time trial at the 2024 Asian Track Cycling Championships in New Delhi, India. In October 2024, Kurdidi set a new Kazakh national record in the 1000 meter time trial and had a seventh place at the 2024 UCI Track Cycling World Championships. He won the bronze medal in the 1 km time trial at the 2025 Asian Track Cycling Championships in Malaysia.

In 2026, he won the gold medal in the 1 km time trial at the 2026 Asian Track Cycling Championships in Tagaytay, the Philippines. He placed fifth in the 1 km time trial at the 2026 UCI Track Cycling World Championships in Shanghai, China.
