= Yuan Liying =

Chinese track cyclist (born 2005)

Personal information
- Born: 13 April 2005 (age 21) Dongfeng County, China

Cycling career
- Sport: Cycling
- Discipline: Track
- Role: Rider
- Rider type: Sprinter
Medal record
Women's track cycling
Representing China
World Championships
Gold medal – first place	2026 Shanghai	Sprint
Gold medal – first place	2026 Shanghai	Team sprint
Silver medal – second place	2022 Saint-Quentin-en-Yvelines	Team sprint
Bronze medal – third place	2023 Glasgow	Team sprint
Asian Games
Gold medal – first place	2022 Hangzhou	Team sprint
Gold medal – first place	2026 Aichi–Nagoya	Sprint
Gold medal – first place	2026 Aichi–Nagoya	Keirin
Gold medal – first place	2026 Aichi–Nagoya	Team sprint
Silver medal – second place	2022 Hangzhou	Sprint
Asian Championships
Gold medal – first place	2023 Nilai	Team sprint
Gold medal – first place	2026 Tagaytay	Sprint
Gold medal – first place	2026 Tagaytay	Keirin
Gold medal – first place	2026 Tagaytay	Team sprint

Yuan Liying (Chinese: 苑丽颖; born 13 April 2005) is a Chinese track cyclist, who competes in sprinting events.

== Career ==
Yuan is a native of the Dongfeng County in the Jilin Province. She remarked herself from a young age, debuting in the provincial team at age 14 and participating in the 2021 National Games of China. She made her first appearance at the international elite level at just 17 years old at the 2022 UCI Track Cycling Nations Cup in Cali. There, she won the team sprint with Guo Yufang and Zhang Linyin and finished third in the keirin. At the 2022 World Championships, she won the silver medal with Guo Yufang and Bao Shanju.

Along with Guo and Bao, she formed the core of the Chinese team sprint squad in 2023. In this formation, they won the gold medal in the 2022 Asian Championships, 2022 Asian Games (also with Jiang Yulu), the Chinese Championships, and the 2023 Nations Cup in Cairo. Individually, Yuan distinguished herself as the Chinese champion in the sprint and won silver behind Mina Sato at the Asian Games.

On June 26, 2024, Yuan, along with Guo Yufang and Bao Shanju, set a new world record of 45.478 seconds in the 750-meter team sprint. The record was set at the Luoyang Sports Center velodrome in Luoyang, China, as part of the 2024 China Track League. The competition was modeled after the 2024 Olympic Games, with international referees and anti-doping control officers among those present. At the Olympic Games, the trio failed to live up to their status as favorites, finishing sixth in the team sprint. In the keirin event, Yuan was eliminated in the quarterfinals. She suffered a crash during the latter event which prevented her from competing in the following sprint event.

In early 2025, Yuan won the sprint at the Nations Cup in Konya. During the qualifying round, she set a historic world record by becoming the first woman to run the 200 meters in under 10 seconds with a flying start. She set another world record at the Chinese Championships in the time trial, clocking at 1:02.857 minutes over 1000 meters.
