= Izu Velodrome =

Velodrome

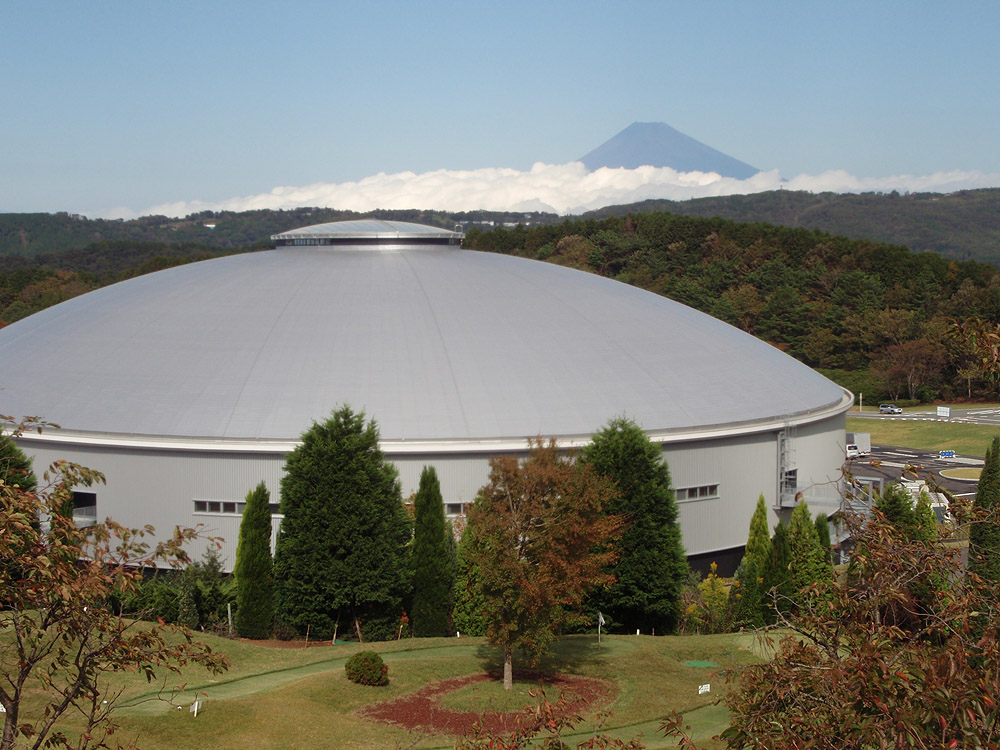
- Interactive map of Izu Velodrome
- Location: Izu, Shizuoka, Japan
- Coordinates: 35.01146°N 139.01543°E
- Capacity: 3,600 (velodrome)
- Surface: Wood
- Field size: 250 metres

Construction
- Opened: 2011
- Architect: Gensler Architects

Tenant
- 2026 Asian Games

The Izu Velodrome is a velodrome in Izu, Shizuoka, Japan. It has a 250-metre cycling track and spectator facilities for 3,600 people. It was opened in 2011, and was selected as the venue to host the track cycling events at the 2020 Summer Olympics in Tokyo. It is the only indoor 250-metre velodrome with a wooden timber surface in Japan, as other velodromes in Japan are outdoors that are longer than 250-metres and with asphalt surfaces, dedicated largely for keirin.

== See also ==
- List of cycling tracks and velodromes
