= Cycling at the 2018 Asian Games =

- Venue: Khe Bun Hill; Subang; Pulomas International BMX Center; Jakarta International Velodrome
- Dates: 20–31 August 2018
- Competitors: 286 from 25 nations

The cycling competitions of the 2018 Asian Games were held at two venues in Subang and two venues in Jakarta from 20 August to 31 August 2018. Road bicycle racing was held around the road of Subang from 22 to 24 August 2018, while track cycling was contested at the Jakarta International Velodrome from 27 to 31 August 2018, mountain biking was contested at Khe Bun Hill in Subang on from 20 to 21 August 2018, and BMX racing was contested at the Pulomas International BMX Center on 25 August 2018.

== Schedule ==
Q	Qualification	E	Elimination rounds	F	Finals

Event↓/Date →	20th Mon		21st Tue	22nd Wed	23rd Thu	24th Fri	25th Sat		26th Sun	27th Mon		28th Tue		29th Wed		30th Thu		31st Fri	
BMX racing
Men							Q	F											
Women							Q	F											
Mountain bike
Men's cross-country			F																
Men's downhill	Q	F																	
Women's cross-country			F																
Women's downhill	Q	F																	
Road
Men's road race					F														
Men's individual time trial						F													
Women's road race				F															
Women's individual time trial						F													
Track
Men's sprint														Q	E	E	F		
Men's keirin																		E	F
Men's individual pursuit														Q	F				
Men's omnium																F			
Men's madison																		F	
Men's team sprint										Q	F								
Men's team pursuit										Q		E	F						
Women's sprint																Q	E	E	F
Women's keirin												E	F						
Women's individual pursuit																Q	F		
Women's omnium														F					
Women's madison																		F	
Women's team sprint										Q	F								
Women's team pursuit										Q		E	F						

== Medalists ==
=== BMX racing ===
Event	Gold	Silver	Bronze
Men	Yoshitaku Nagasako; Japan	I Gusti Bagus Saputra; Indonesia	Daniel Caluag; Philippines
Women	Zhang Yaru; China	Chutikan Kitwanitsathian; Thailand	Wiji Lestari; Indonesia

=== Mountain bike ===
Event	Gold	Silver	Bronze
Men's cross-country	Ma Hao; China	Lü Xianjing; China	Kirill Kazantsev; Kazakhstan
Men's downhill	Khoiful Mukhib; Indonesia	Chiang Sheng-shan; Chinese Taipei	Suebsakun Sukchanya; Thailand
Women's cross-country	Yao Bianwa; China	Li Hongfeng; China	Natalie Panyawan; Thailand
Women's downhill	Tiara Andini Prastika; Indonesia	Vipavee Deekaballes; Thailand	Nining Porwaningsih; Indonesia

=== Road ===
Event	Gold	Silver	Bronze
Men's road race	Alexey Lutsenko; Kazakhstan	Fumiyuki Beppu; Japan	Navuti Liphongyu; Thailand
Men's individual time trial	Alexey Lutsenko; Kazakhstan	Muradjan Khalmuratov; Uzbekistan	Fumiyuki Beppu; Japan
Women's road race	Na Ah-reum; South Korea	Pu Yixian; China	Eri Yonamine; Japan
Women's individual time trial	Na Ah-reum; South Korea	Eri Yonamine; Japan	Leung Wing Yee; Hong Kong

=== Track ===
Event	Gold	Silver	Bronze
Men's sprint	Azizulhasni Awang; Malaysia	Tomohiro Fukaya; Japan	Im Chae-bin; South Korea
Men's keirin	Jai Angsuthasawit; Thailand	Yudai Nitta; Japan	Azizulhasni Awang; Malaysia
Men's individual pursuit	Park Sang-hoon; South Korea	Ryo Chikatani; Japan	Artyom Zakharov; Kazakhstan
Men's omnium	Eiya Hashimoto; Japan	Leung Chun Wing; Hong Kong	Artyom Zakharov; Kazakhstan
Men's madison	Hong Kong; Cheung King Lok; Leung Chun Wing	South Korea; Park Sang-hoon; Kim Ok-cheol	Japan; Eiya Hashimoto; Shunsuke Imamura
Men's team sprint	China; Li Jianxin; Xu Chao; Zhou Yu	Malaysia; Azizulhasni Awang; Shah Firdaus Sahrom; Fadhil Zonis	Japan; Kazuki Amagai; Yudai Nitta; Tomohiro Fukaya
Men's team pursuit	China; Guo Liang; Qin Chenlu; Xue Chaohua; Shen Pingan	Hong Kong; Leung Chun Wing; Leung Ka Yu; Mow Ching Yin; Cheung King Lok; Ko Siu Wai	Japan; Shogo Ichimaru; Shunsuke Imamura; Ryo Chikatani; Eiya Hashimoto; Keitaro Sawada
Women's sprint	Lee Wai Sze; Hong Kong	Lee Hye-jin; South Korea	Cho Sun-young; South Korea
Women's keirin	Lee Wai Sze; Hong Kong	Lee Hye-jin; South Korea	Zhong Tianshi; China
Women's individual pursuit	Lee Ju-mi; South Korea	Wang Hong; China	Huang Ting-ying; Chinese Taipei
Women's omnium	Yumi Kajihara; Japan	Huang Ting-ying; Chinese Taipei	Kim You-ri; South Korea
Women's madison	South Korea; Kim You-ri; Na Ah-reum	Hong Kong; Yang Qianyu; Pang Yao	China; Liu Jiali; Wang Xiaofei
Women's team sprint	China; Lin Junhong; Zhong Tianshi	Hong Kong; Li Yin Yin; Ma Wing Yu; Lee Wai Sze	South Korea; Kim Won-gyeong; Lee Hye-jin; Cho Sun-young
Women's team pursuit	South Korea; Kim You-ri; Na Ah-reum; Kim Hyun-ji; Lee Ju-mi	China; Liu Jiali; Wang Xiaofei; Wang Hong; Chen Qiaolin; Ma Menglu; Jin Chenhong	Japan; Yuya Hashimoto; Miho Yoshikawa; Kisato Nakamura; Yumi Kajihara; Nao Suzuki

== Medal table ==
Rank	Nation	Gold	Silver	Bronze	Total
1	China (CHN)	6	5	2	13
2	South Korea (KOR)	6	3	4	13
3	Japan (JPN)	3	5	6	14
4	Hong Kong (HKG)	3	4	1	8
5	Indonesia (INA)	2	1	2	5
6	Kazakhstan (KAZ)	2	0	3	5
7	Thailand (THA)	1	2	3	6
8	Malaysia (MAS)	1	1	1	3
9	Chinese Taipei (TPE)	0	2	1	3
10	Uzbekistan (UZB)	0	1	0	1
11	Philippines (PHI)	0	0	1	1
Totals (11 entries)		24	24	24	72

== Participating nations ==
A total of 286 athletes from 25 nations competed in cycling at the 2018 Asian Games:

- Bahrain (2)
- China (33)
- Chinese Taipei (9)
- Hong Kong (22)
- India (14)
- Indonesia (30)
- Iran (14)
- Japan (24)
- Kazakhstan (17)
- Kyrgyzstan (1)
- Laos (2)
- Lebanon (1)
- Macau (3)
- Malaysia (16)
- Mongolia (7)
- Nepal (3)
- Philippines (7)
- Singapore (3)
- South Korea (25)
- Syria (3)
- Thailand (29)
- Timor-Leste (5)
- United Arab Emirates (5)
- Uzbekistan (3)
- Vietnam (8)
