= 2016 UCI Track Cycling World Championships – Women's team pursuit =

Women's team pursuit at the 2016 UCI Track Cycling World Championships
- Venue: Lee Valley VeloPark, London
- Date: 3–4 March
- Competitors: 56 from 13 nations
- Teams: 13
- Winning time: 4:16.802

Medalists
gold medal	Sarah Hammer; Kelly Catlin; Chloé Dygert; Jennifer Valente	United States
silver medal	Allison Beveridge; Jasmin Glaesser; Kirsti Lay; Georgia Simmerling	Canada
bronze medal	Laura Trott; Elinor Barker; Ciara Horne; Joanna Rowsell Shand	Great Britain

The Women's team pursuit event of the 2016 UCI Track Cycling World Championships was held on 3 and 4 March 2016. The United States beat Canada in the final to win the gold medal.

== Results ==
=== Qualifying ===
The qualifying was started at 13:00.

Rank	Athletes	Nation	Time	Notes
1	Sarah Hammer; Kelly Catlin; Chloé Dygert; Jennifer Valente	United States	4:16.180	Q
2	Allison Beveridge; Jasmin Glaesser; Kirsti Lay; Georgia Simmerling	Canada	4:20.664	Q
3	Lauren Ellis; Rushlee Buchanan; Jaime Nielsen; Racquel Sheath	New Zealand	4:20.673	Q
4	Annette Edmondson; Georgia Baker; Ashlee Ankudinoff; Amy Cure	Australia	4:20.830	Q
5	Laura Trott; Elinor Barker; Ciara Horne; Joanna Rowsell Shand	Great Britain	4:21.054	Q
6	Katarzyna Pawłowska; Eugenia Bujak; Edyta Jasińska; Natalia Rutkowska	Poland	4:29.239	Q
7	Simona Frapporti; Tatiana Guderzo; Francesca Pattaro; Silvia Valsecchi	Italy	4:29.857	Q
8	Huang Dongyan; Jing Yali; Ma Menglu; Zhao Baofang	China	4:29.941	Q
9	Caroline Ryan; Lydia Boylan; Josie Knight; Melanie Späth	Ireland	4:32.127	
10	Stephanie Pohl; Charlotte Becker; Mieke Kröger; Gudrun Stock	Germany	4:32.398	
11	Ina Savenka; Katsiaryna Piatrouskaya; Polina Pivovarova; Marina Shmayankova	Belarus	4:32.952	
12	Tamara Balabolina; Gulnaz Badykova; Anastasia Chulkova; Evgenia Romanyuta	Russia	4:35.521	
13	Sakura Tsukagoshi; Minami Uwano; Yumi Kajihara; Kisato Nakamura	Japan	4:38.394	

=== First round ===
The winners of the first two heats advanced to the final. After that, the results were used to determine the placement rounds. It was held at 15:20.

Rank	Name	Nation	Time	Behind
1 vs 4
1	Sarah Hammer; Kelly Catlin; Chloé Dygert; Jennifer Valente	United States	4:14.806	
2	Annette Edmondson; Georgia Baker; Ashlee Ankudinoff; Amy Cure	Australia	4:18.559	+3.753
2 vs 3
1	Allison Beveridge; Jasmin Glaesser; Kirsti Lay; Georgia Simmerling	Canada	4:18.261	
2	Lauren Ellis; Rushlee Buchanan; Jaime Nielsen; Racquel Sheath	New Zealand	4:18.264	+0.003
5 vs 8
1	Laura Trott; Elinor Barker; Ciara Horne; Joanna Rowsell Shand	Great Britain	4:16.350	
2	Huang Dongyan; Jing Yali; Ma Menglu; Zhao Baofang	China	4:27.762	+11.412
6 vs 7
1	Simona Frapporti; Tatiana Guderzo; Francesca Pattaro; Silvia Valsecchi	Italy	4:26.162	
2	Katarzyna Pawłowska; Eugenia Bujak; Edyta Jasińska; Natalia Rutkowska	Poland	4:29.166	+3.004

=== Finals ===
The final were started at 19:05.

Rank	Name	Nation	Time	Behind
Gold medal race
1st place, gold medalist(s)	Sarah Hammer; Kelly Catlin; Chloé Dygert; Jennifer Valente	United States	4:16.802	
2nd place, silver medalist(s)	Allison Beveridge; Jasmin Glaesser; Kirsti Lay; Georgia Simmerling	Canada	4:19.525	+2.723
Bronze medal race
3rd place, bronze medalist(s)	Laura Trott; Elinor Barker; Ciara Horne; Joanna Rowsell Shand	Great Britain	4:16.540	
4	Lauren Ellis; Rushlee Buchanan; Jaime Nielsen; Racquel Sheath	New Zealand	4:20.225	+3.685
Fifth place race
5	Georgia Baker; Ashlee Ankudinoff; Amy Cure; Rebecca Wiasak	Australia		
6	Beatrice Bartelloni; Tatiana Guderzo; Francesca Pattaro; Silvia Valsecchi	Italy	OVL	
Seventh place race
7	Katarzyna Pawłowska; Edyta Jasińska; Justyna Kaczkowska; Daria Pikulik	Poland	4:27.165	
8	Huang Dongyan; Jing Yali; Ma Menglu; Zhao Baofang	China	4:27.508	+0.343
