= Cycling at the 2016 Summer Olympics – Women's team pursuit =

Women's cycling team pursuit at the Games of the XXXI Olympiad
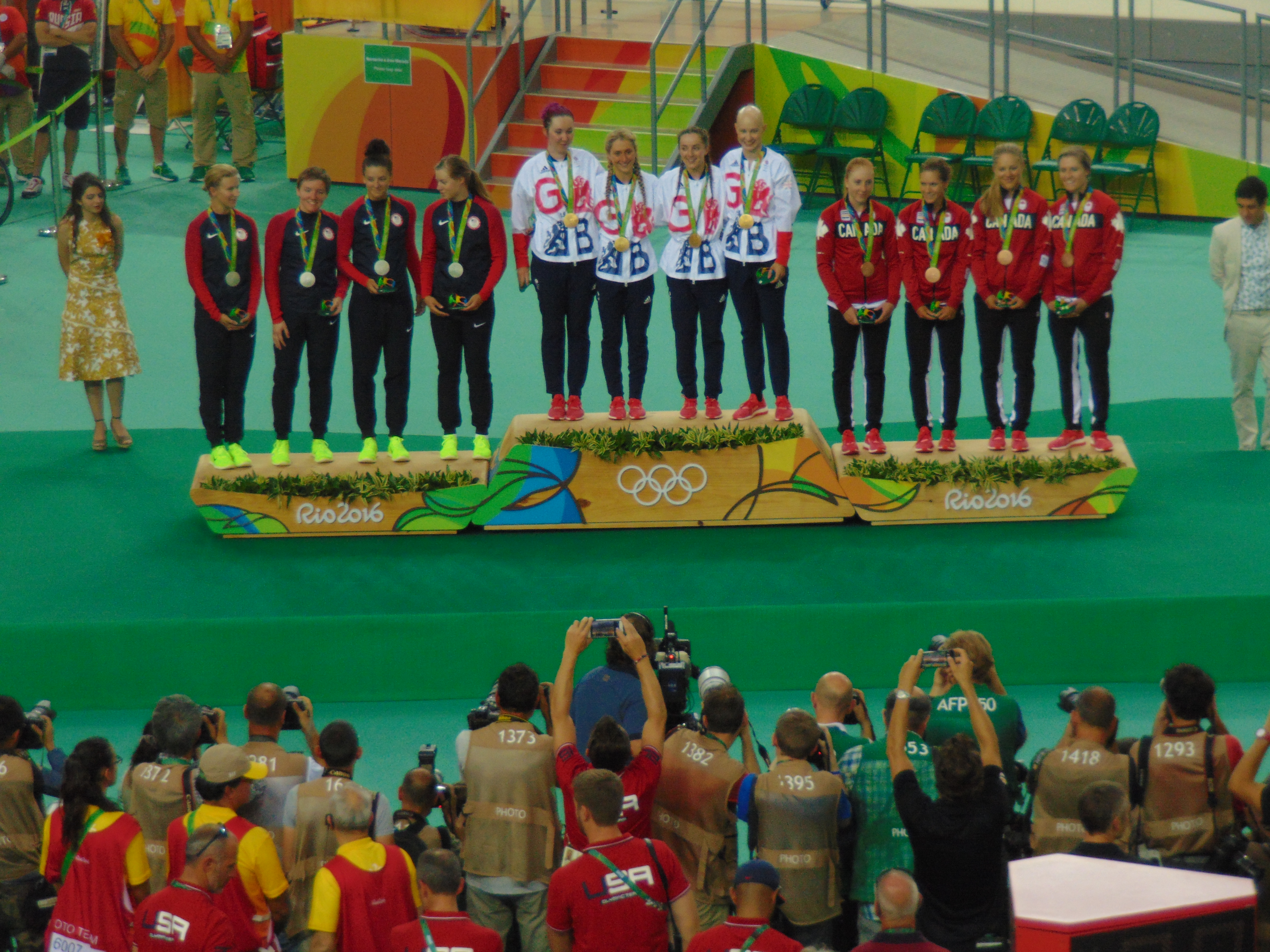
- The podium of the event
- Venue: Rio Olympic Velodrome
- Date: 11–13 August 2016
- Competitors: 39 from 9 nations
- Winning time: 4:10.236 WR, OR

Medalists
1st place, gold medalist(s)		Katie Archibald; Laura Trott; Elinor Barker; Joanna Rowsell Shand	Great Britain
2nd place, silver medalist(s)		Sarah Hammer; Kelly Catlin; Chloé Dygert; Jennifer Valente	United States
3rd place, bronze medalist(s)		Allison Beveridge; Jasmin Glaesser; Kirsti Lay; Georgia Simmerling; Laura Brown	Canada

The women's cycling team pursuit at the 2016 Olympic Games in Rio de Janeiro took place at the Rio Olympic Velodrome on 11 and 13 August. Great Britain has yet to be beaten in this event.

The medals were presented by Claudia Bokel, IOC member, Germany and Mohammad Belmahi, Member of the UCI Management Committee.

== Schedule ==
All times are Brasília Time

Date	Round
Thursday 11 August 2016	Qualification
Saturday 13 August 2016	Heats
Saturday 13 August 2016	Final

== Results ==
=== Qualifications ===
The fastest 8 teams qualify for the first round, from which the top 4 remain in contention for the gold medal final and the other 4 for the bronze medal final.

Rank	Country	Cyclists	Result	Notes
1	Great Britain	Katie Archibald; Laura Trott; Elinor Barker; Joanna Rowsell Shand	4:13.260	Q, WR, OR
2	United States	Sarah Hammer; Kelly Catlin; Chloé Dygert; Jennifer Valente	4:14.286	Q
3	Australia	Georgia Baker; Annette Edmondson; Amy Cure; Melissa Hoskins	4:19.059	Q
4	Canada	Allison Beveridge; Jasmin Glaesser; Laura Brown; Georgia Simmerling	4:19.599	Q
5	New Zealand	Lauren Ellis; Racquel Sheath; Rushlee Buchanan; Jaime Nielsen	4:20.061	q
6	China	Huang Dongyan; Jing Yali; Ma Menglu; Zhao Baofang	4:25.246	q
7	Italy	Simona Frapporti; Tatiana Guderzo; Francesca Pattaro; Silvia Valsecchi	4:25.543	q
8	Poland	Daria Pikulik; Edyta Jasińska; Justyna Kaczkowska; Natalia Rutkowska	4:28.988	q
9	Germany	Gudrun Stock; Charlotte Becker; Mieke Kröger; Stephanie Pohl	4:30.068	

- Q = qualified; in contention for gold medal final
- q = qualified; in contention for bronze medal final

=== First round ===
First round heats are held as follows:
Heat 1: 6th v 7th qualifier
Heat 2: 5th v 8th qualifier
Heat 3: 2nd v 3rd qualifier
Heat 4: 1st v 4th qualifier

The winners of heats 3 and 4 proceed to the gold medal final. The remaining 6 teams are ranked on time, then proceed to the finals for bronze, 5th or 7th place.

Rank	Heat	Country	Cyclists	Result	Notes
1	4	Great Britain	Katie Archibald; Laura Trott; Elinor Barker; Joanna Rowsell Shand	4:12.152	QG, WR, OR
2	3	United States	Sarah Hammer; Kelly Catlin; Chloé Dygert; Jennifer Valente	4:12.282^{[A]}	QG
3	4	Canada	Allison Beveridge; Jasmin Glaesser; Kirsti Lay; Georgia Simmerling	4:15.636	QB
4	2	New Zealand	Lauren Ellis; Racquel Sheath; Rushlee Buchanan; Jaime Nielsen	4:17.592	QB
5	3	Australia	Georgia Baker; Annette Edmondson; Amy Cure; Melissa Hoskins	4:20.262	Q5
6	1	Italy	Simona Frapporti; Tatiana Guderzo; Francesca Pattaro; Silvia Valsecchi	4:22.964	Q5
7	1	China	Huang Dongyan; Jing Yali; Ma Menglu; Zhao Baofang	4:23.678	Q7
	2	Poland	Daria Pikulik; Edyta Jasińska; Justyna Kaczkowska; Natalia Rutkowska	DSQ^{[B]} ~~4:27.299~~	

- ^{^{A}} Was also a world and Olympic record until superseded by Great Britain in the following heat
- ^{^{B}} Poland were disqualified for breaching article 3.2.097
- QG = qualified for gold medal final
- QB = qualified for bronze medal final
- Q5 = qualified for 5th place final
- Q7 = qualified for 7th place final

=== Finals ===
The final classification is determined in the ranking finals.

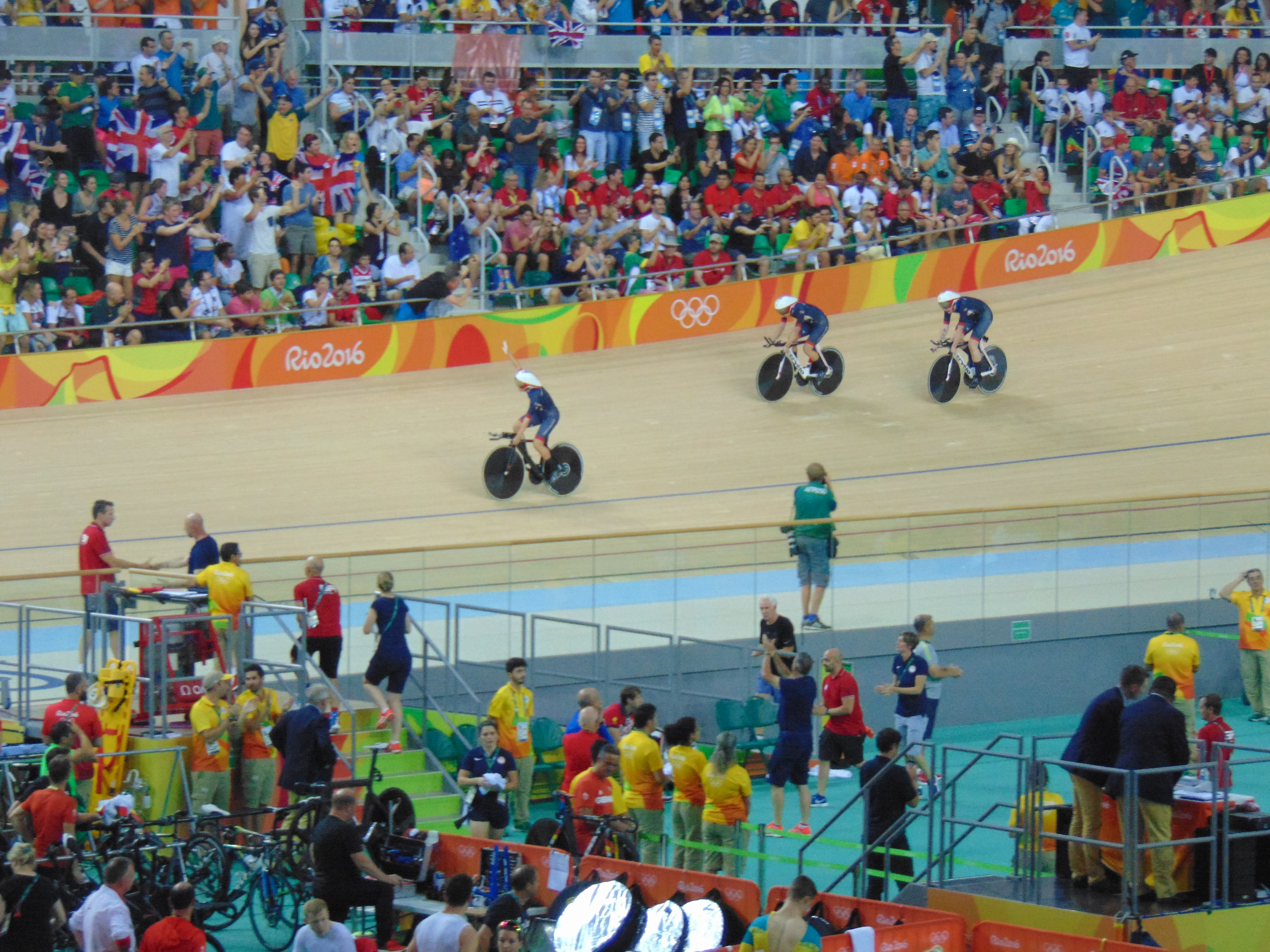
Great Britain celebrating the gold medal

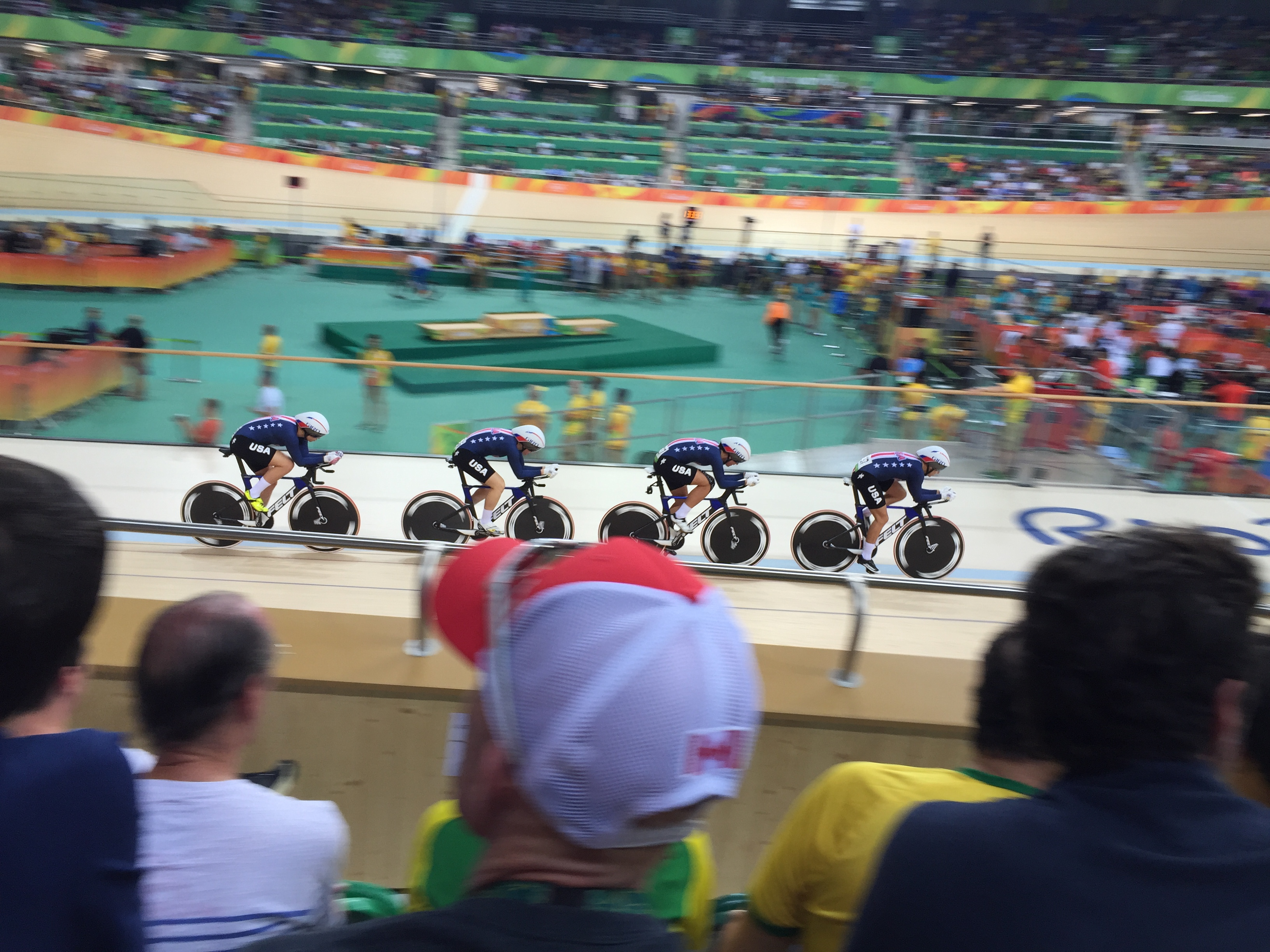
United States won the silver medal

Rank	Country	Cyclists	Result	Notes
Final for 7th place
7	China	Huang Dongyan; Jing Yali; Ma Menglu; Zhao Baofang		
Final for 5th place
5	Australia	Georgia Baker; Annette Edmondson; Ashlee Ankudinoff; Amy Cure	4:21.232	
6	Italy	Beatrice Bartelloni; Tatiana Guderzo; Francesca Pattaro; Silvia Valsecchi	4:28.368	
Bronze medal final
3rd place, bronze medalist(s)	Canada	Allison Beveridge; Jasmin Glaesser; Kirsti Lay; Georgia Simmerling	4:14.627	
4	New Zealand	Lauren Ellis; Racquel Sheath; Rushlee Buchanan; Jaime Nielsen	4:18.459	
Gold medal final
1st place, gold medalist(s)	Great Britain	Katie Archibald; Laura Trott; Elinor Barker; Joanna Rowsell Shand	4:10.236	WR, OR
2nd place, silver medalist(s)	United States	Sarah Hammer; Kelly Catlin; Chloé Dygert; Jennifer Valente	4:12.454	
