= Cycling at the 2018 Asian Games – Women's team pursuit =

Cycling Competition at Jakarta

Women's team pursuit at the 2018 Asian Games
- Venue: Jakarta International Velodrome
- Date: 27–28 August 2018
- Competitors: 25 from 5 nations

Medalists
gold medal	South Korea; Kim You-ri, Na Ah-reum, Kim Hyun-ji, Lee Ju-mi
silver medal	China; Liu Jiali, Wang Xiaofei, Wang Hong, Chen Qiaolin, Ma Menglu, Jin Chenhong
bronze medal	Japan; Yuya Hashimoto, Miho Yoshikawa, Kisato Nakamura, Yumi Kajihara, Nao Suzuki

The women's team pursuit competition at the 2018 Asian Games was held on 27 and 28 August at the Jakarta International Velodrome.

== Schedule ==
All times are Western Indonesia Time (UTC+07:00)

Date	Time	Event
Monday, 27 August 2018	13:32	Qualifying
Tuesday, 28 August 2018	09:18	First round
Tuesday, 28 August 2018	16:12	Finals

== Records ==
Prior to this competition, the existing world, Asian and Games records were as follows.

World Record	Great Britain	4:10.236	Rio de Janeiro, Brazil	13 August 2016
Asian Record	Japan	4:22.138	Nilai, Malaysia	17 February 2018
Games Record	China	4:28.469	Incheon, South Korea	22 September 2014

== Results ==
=== Qualifying ===
Rank	Team	Time	Notes
1	South Korea (KOR); Kim You-ri; Na Ah-reum; Kim Hyun-ji; Lee Ju-mi	4:24.796	GR
2	China (CHN); Liu Jiali; Ma Menglu; Wang Xiaofei; Wang Hong	4:30.951	
3	Japan (JPN); Miho Yoshikawa; Yumi Kajihara; Kisato Nakamura; Yuya Hashimoto	4:33.768	
4	Hong Kong (HKG); Yang Qianyu; Pang Yao; Diao Xiaojuan; Leung Bo Yee	4:40.246	
5	India (IND); Sonali Chanu; Nayana Rajesh Priyadarshini; Chaoba Devi Elangbam; Megha Gugad	5:05.388	

=== First round ===
==== Heat 1 ====
Rank	Team	Time	Notes
1	India (IND); Nayana Rajesh Priyadarshini; Chaoba Devi Elangbam; Megha Gugad; Monorama Devi	5:07.863	

==== Heat 2 ====
Rank	Team	Time	Notes
1	China (CHN); Liu Jiali; Wang Xiaofei; Wang Hong; Jin Chenhong	4:31.317	
2	Japan (JPN); Yuya Hashimoto; Miho Yoshikawa; Yumi Kajihara; Nao Suzuki	4:33.370	

==== Heat 3 ====
Rank	Team	Time	Notes
1	South Korea (KOR); Kim You-ri; Na Ah-reum; Kim Hyun-ji; Lee Ju-mi	4:43.245	
2	Hong Kong (HKG); Yang Qianyu; Pang Yao; Leung Bo Yee; Leung Wing Yee	4:52.552	

==== Summary ====
Rank	Team	Time
3	Japan (JPN)	4:33.370
4	Hong Kong (HKG)	4:52.552
5	India (IND)	5:07.863

=== Finals ===
==== Bronze ====
Rank	Team	Time	Notes
3rd place, bronze medalist(s)	Japan (JPN); Yuya Hashimoto; Miho Yoshikawa; Kisato Nakamura; Yumi Kajihara		
4	Hong Kong (HKG); Yang Qianyu; Leung Bo Yee; Leung Wing Yee; Diao Xiaojuan	Overlapped	

==== Gold ====
Rank	Team	Time	Notes
1st place, gold medalist(s)	South Korea (KOR); Kim You-ri; Na Ah-reum; Kim Hyun-ji; Lee Ju-mi	4:23.652	GR
2nd place, silver medalist(s)	China (CHN); Liu Jiali; Wang Xiaofei; Wang Hong; Chen Qiaolin	Overlapped	
