= List of Iranian records in track cycling =

The following are the national records in track cycling in Iran, maintained by its national cycling federation, Cycling Federation of the Islamic Republic of Iran.

== Men ==
Event	Record	Athlete	Date	Meet	Place	Ref
Flying 200 m time trial	10.109	Amin Rahimabadi	15 June 2023	Asian Championships	Nilai, Malaysia	
250m time trial (standing start)	19.110	Amin Rahimabadi	14 June 2023	Asian Championships	Nilai, Malaysia	
500 m time trial	32.295	Mohammad Daneshvarkhourram	18 February 2018	Asian Championships	Nilai, Malaysia	
1 km time trial	1:01.990	Mohammad Daneshvarkhourram	18 February 2018	Asian Championships	Nilai, Malaysia	
Team sprint	46.618	Amin Rahimabadi; Abbas Zarezadeh; Abolfazl Aminalroayae	14 June 2023	Asian Championships	Nilai, Malaysia	
4000 m individual pursuit	4:25.369	Aidin Aliyari	6 August 2022	Islamic Solidarity Games	Konya, Turkey	
4000 m team pursuit	4:12.650	Behnam Ariyan; Hossein Nateghi; Mohammed Yousef Al-Mansoori; Mohammad Rajablou	9 January 2019	Asian Championships	Jakarta, Indonesia	
Hour record						

== Women ==
Event	Record	Athlete	Date	Meet	Place	Ref
Flying 200 m time trial	12.034	Setareh Zargar	15 June 2023	Asian Championships	Nilai, Malaysia	
250 m time trial (standing start)	20.460	Fatemeh Hadavand	18 June 2022	Asian Championships	New Delhi, India	
Flying 500 m time trial						
500 m time trial	37.144	Fatemeh Hadavand	19 June 2022	Asian Championships	New Delhi, India	
Team sprint (750 m)	52.386	Fatemeh Hadavand; Setareh Zargar; Maedeh Nazari	18 June 2022	Asian Championships	New Delhi, India	
3000 m individual pursuit	3:54.529	Somayeh Yazdani	6 August 2022	Islamic Solidarity Games	Konya, Turkey	
3000 m team pursuit						
Hour record						
