= Kim Ok-cheol =

South Korean cyclist

Personal information
- Full name: Kim Ok-cheol; Korean: 김옥철
- Born: 16 November 1994 (age 31) Daegu, South Korea

Cycling career
- Sport: Cycling
- Disciplines: Track; Road
- Role: Puncheur

Professional teams
- 2013–2020: Seoul Cycling Team
- 2021: Geumsan Insam Cello
Medal record
Representing South Korea
Men's track cycling
Asian Games
Silver medal – second place	2018 Jakarta-Palembang	Madison
Asian Championships
Gold medal – first place	2019 Jakarta	Madison
Gold medal – first place	2019 Jakarta	Team pursuit
Silver medal – second place	2017 New Delhi	Team pursuit
Silver medal – second place	2018 Nilai	Team pursuit
Bronze medal – third place	2016 Izu	Team pursuit
Bronze medal – third place	2017 New Delhi	Omnium
Bronze medal – third place	2018 Nilai	Madison

Kim Ok-cheol (Korean: 김옥철; Korean pronunciation: [ki.mok̚.tɕʰʌl] or [kim] [ok̚.tɕʰʌl]; born 16 November 1994) is a South Korean road and track cyclist, who most recently rode for UCI Continental team Geumsan Insam Cello. He won the bronze medal in the team pursuit at the 2016 Asian Cycling Championships.

== Major results ==
2015
National Road Championships

1st Under-23 road race
2nd Road race

4th Overall Jelajah Malaysia

1st Young rider classification

4th Overall Tour of Thailand
2016
1st Stage 6 Tour of Thailand
1st Stage 2 Tour of Fuzhou
3rd Team pursuit, Asian Track Championships
6th Road race, Asian Road Championships
2017
Asian Track Championships

2nd Team pursuit
3rd Omnium

3rd Road race, National Road Championships
6th Overall Tour of Thailand
2018
2nd Madison, Asian Games (with Park Sang-hoon)
Asian Track Championships

2nd Team pursuit
3rd Madison (with Im Jae-yeon)

2019
Asian Track Championships

1st Madison (with Im Jae-yeon)
1st Team pursuit
