= Olympic record progression track cycling – Women's team pursuit =

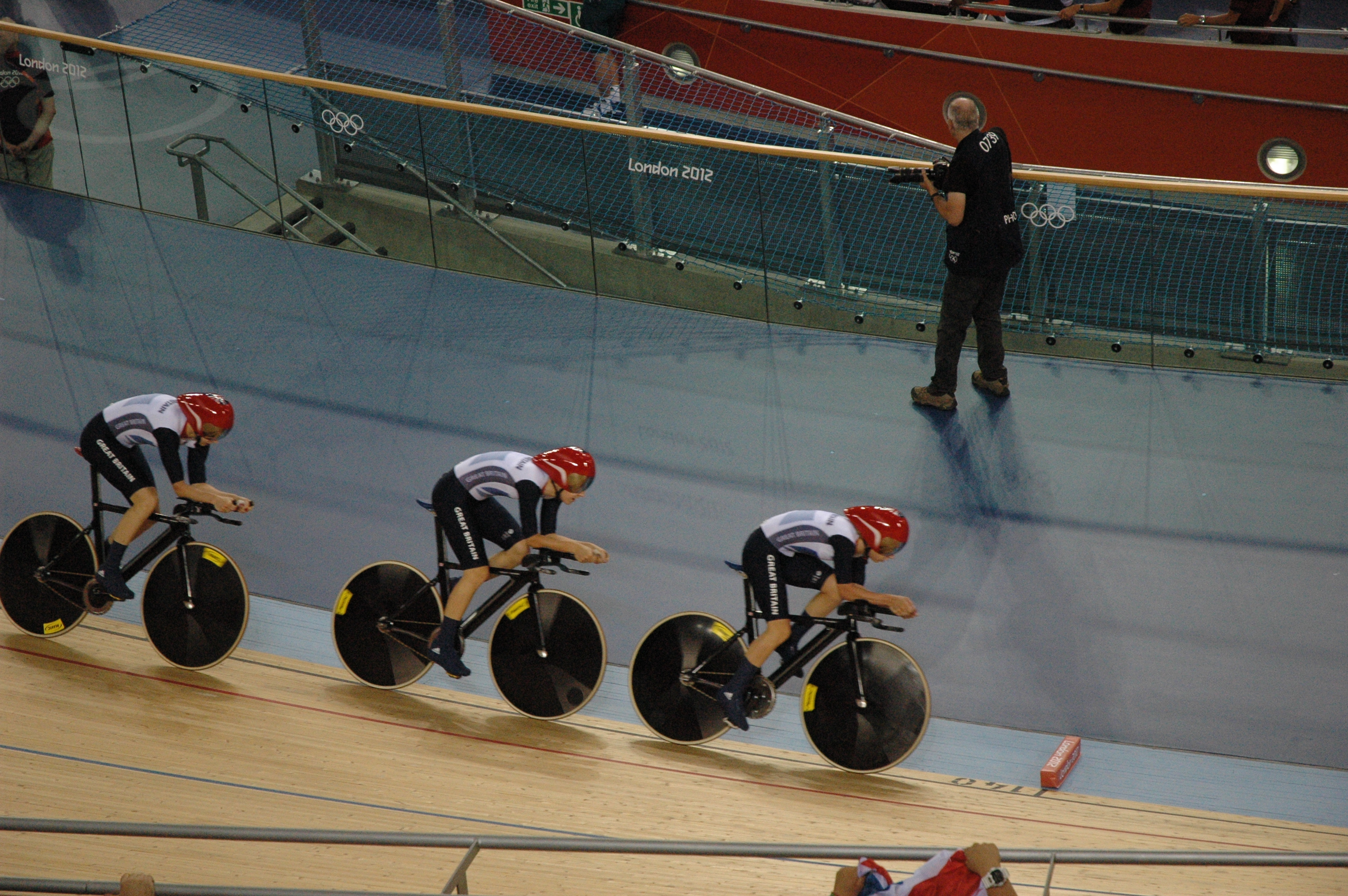
The British Team riding the current Olympic record at the 2012 Summer Olympics

This is an overview of the progression of the Olympic track cycling record of the women's team pursuit as recognised by the Union Cycliste Internationale (UCI).

The women's 3000m team pursuit discipline for 3 riders was introduced at the 2012 Summer Olympics. After the 2012–13 track cycling season the UCI changed the discipline into a format of 4000 m with 4 riders, as it will be at the 2016 Summer Olympics.

== Progression ==
♦ denotes a performance that is also a current world record. Statistics are correct as of the end of the 2016 Summer Olympics.

=== 3000 m (2012) ===
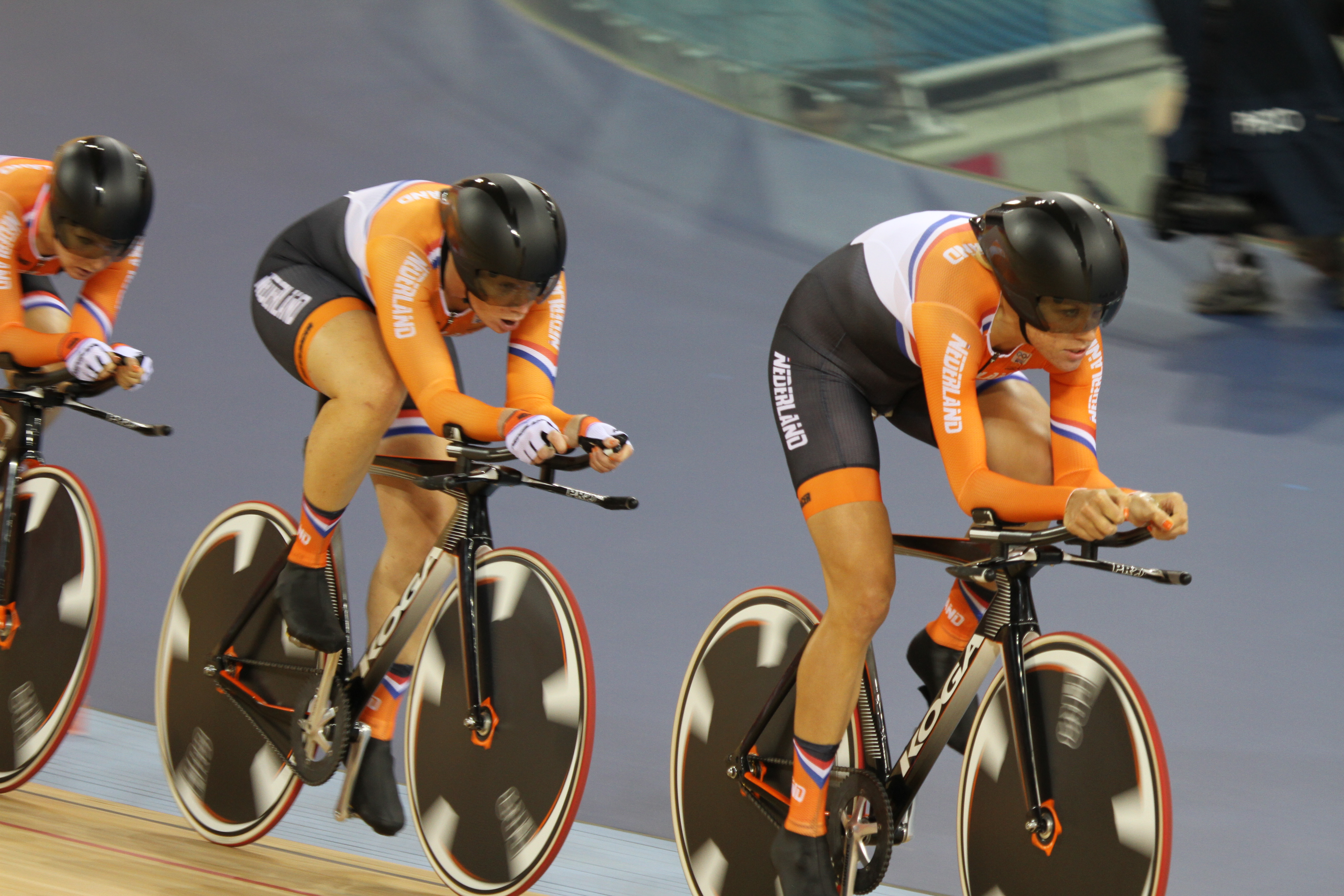
The Dutch team (Ellen van Dijk, Kirsten Wild, Amy Pieters) had temporarily the Olympic record during the qualification session in 2012

During the Qualification session there were several teams who rode a new best time and so had temporarily the Olympic Record. They are not listed as Olympic Record holders because they did not win the qualification session. These countries who had temporarily the Olympic record are:

- Heat 1: Belarus: Tatsiana Sharakova, Alena Dylko, Aksana Papko in a time of 3:22.850
- Heat 4: Netherlands: Ellen van Dijk, Kirsten Wild, Amy Pieters in a time of 3:21.602
- Heat 6: Canada: Tara Whitten, Gillian Carleton, Jasmin Glaesser in a time of 3:19.816
- Heat 7: United States: Sarah Hammer, Dotsie Bausch, Jennie Reed in a time of 3:19.406

Time	Cyclists	Location	Track	Date	Meet
3:15.669	Great Britain; Danielle King; Laura Trott; Joanna Rowsell	(United Kingdom) London, London Velopark	Indoor track	3 August 2012	2012 Summer Olympics; Qualification
3:14.682	Great Britain; Danielle King; Laura Trott; Joanna Rowsell	(United Kingdom) London, London Velopark	Indoor track	4 August 2012	2012 Summer Olympics; Round 1
3:14.051	Great Britain; Danielle King; Laura Trott; Joanna Rowsell	(United Kingdom) London, London Velopark	Indoor track	4 August 2012	2012 Summer Olympics; Gold medal race

=== 4000 m (from 2016) ===
During the Qualification session there were several teams who rode a new best time and so had temporarily the Olympic Record. They are not listed as Olympic Record holders because they did not win the qualification session. These countries who had temporarily the Olympic record are:

- Heat 1: Poland: Daria Pikulik, Edyta Jasińska, Justyna Kaczkowska, Natalia Rutkowska in a time of 4:28.988
- Heat 3: Italy: Simona Frapporti, Tatiana Guderzo, Francesca Pattaro, Silvia Valsecchi in a time of 4:25.543
- Heat 4: New Zealand: Lauren Ellis, Racquel Sheath, Rushlee Buchanan, Jaime Nielsen in a time of 4:20.061
- Heat 6: Australia: Georgia Baker, Annette Edmondson, Amy Cure, Melissa Hoskins in a time of 4:19.059

Time	Cyclists	Location	Track	Date	Meet	Ref
4:13.260	Great Britain; Katie Archibald; Laura Trott; Elinor Barker; Joanna Rowsell-Shand	(Brazil) Rio de Janeiro, Rio Olympic Velodrome	Indoor track	11 August 2016	2016 Summer Olympics; Qualifying	
4:12.282	United States; Sarah Hammer; Kelly Catlin; Chloé Dygert; Jennifer Valente	(Brazil) Rio de Janeiro, Rio Olympic Velodrome	Indoor track	13 August 2016	2016 Summer Olympics; First round	
4:12.152	Great Britain; Katie Archibald; Laura Trott; Elinor Barker; Joanna Rowsell-Shand	(Brazil) Rio de Janeiro, Rio Olympic Velodrome	Indoor track	13 August 2016	2016 Summer Olympics; First round	
4:10.236	Great Britain; Katie Archibald; Laura Trott; Elinor Barker; Joanna Rowsell-Shand	(Brazil) Rio de Janeiro, Rio Olympic Velodrome	Indoor track	13 August 2016	2016 Summer Olympics; Finals	
4:07.307	Germany; Franziska Brauße; Lisa Brennauer; Lisa Klein; Mieke Kröger	(Japan) Izu Velodrome, Izu	Indoor track	2 August 2021	2020 Summer Olympics; Qualifying	
4:06.159	Germany; Franziska Brauße; Lisa Brennauer; Lisa Klein; Mieke Kröger	(Japan) Izu Velodrome, Izu	Indoor track	3 August 2021	2020 Summer Olympics; First round	
♦4:04.242	Germany; Franziska Brauße; Lisa Brennauer; Lisa Klein; Mieke Kröger	(Japan) Izu Velodrome, Izu	Indoor track	3 August 2021	2020 Summer Olympics; Finals	
