= Park Sang-hoon (cyclist) =

South Korean bicycle racer

Personal information
- Full name: Park Sang-hoon; Korean: 박상훈
- Born: 13 March 1993 (age 33) Cheonan, South Korea

Cycling career
- Sport: Cycling
- Current team: UijeongBu Cycling Team
- Disciplines: Road; Track
- Role: Rider

Professional teams
- 2014–2017: Seoul Cycling Team
- 2018–2019: LX Cycling Team
- 2020–: UijeongBu Cycling Team
Medal record
Representing South Korea
Men's track cycling
Asian Games
Gold medal – first place	2018 Jakarta-Palembang	Individual pursuit
Silver medal – second place	2014 Incheon	Team pursuit
Silver medal – second place	2018 Jakarta-Palembang	Madison
Bronze medal – third place	2026 Aichi–Nagoya	Team pursuit
Asian Championships
Gold medal – first place	2015 Nakhon Ratchasima	Individual pursuit
Gold medal – first place	2017 New Delhi	Individual pursuit
Gold medal – first place	2017 New Delhi	Madison
Gold medal – first place	2019 Jakarta	Points race
Gold medal – first place	2020 Incheon	Individual pursuit
Gold medal – first place	2025 Nilai	Team pursuit
Silver medal – second place	2017 New Delhi	Team pursuit
Silver medal – second place	2020 Incheon	Team pursuit
Silver medal – second place	2022 New Delhi	Individual pursuit
Silver medal – second place	2022 New Delhi	Madison
Silver medal – second place	2022 New Delhi	Team pursuit
Silver medal – second place	2025 Nilai	Elimination
Silver medal – second place	2025 Nilai	Madison
Bronze medal – third place	2015 Nakhon Ratchasima	Team pursuit
Bronze medal – third place	2023 Nilai	Omnium

Park Sang-hoon (Korean: 박상훈, Korean pronunciation: [pak̚.s͈aŋ.ɦun] or [pak̚] [saŋ.ɦun]; born 13 March 1993) is a South Korean cyclist, who rides for UCI Continental team UijeongBu Cycling Team.

== Major results ==
=== Road ===
2010
1st Time trial, Asian Junior Road Championships
2011
Asian Junior Road Championships

1st Road race
3rd Time trial

2014
Asian Under-23 Road Championships

2nd Time trial
6th Road race

2015
1st Time trial, Asian Under-23 Road Championships
National Road Championships

1st Under-23 time trial
2nd Time trial

2017
2nd Time trial, National Road Championships
2018
3rd Time trial, National Road Championships
2019
1st Stage 2 Tour of Thailand
2nd Team time trial, Asian Road Championships

=== Track ===
2010
1st Team pursuit, Asian Junior Track Championships
2011
Asian Junior Track Championships

2nd Team pursuit
3rd Points race

2014
2nd Team pursuit, Asian Games
2015
Asian Track Championships

1st Individual pursuit
3rd Team pursuit

2017
Asian Track Championships

1st Individual pursuit
1st Madison (with Im Jae-yeon)
2nd Team pursuit

3rd Omnium, 2016–17 UCI Track Cycling World Cup, Los Angeles
2018
Asian Games

1st Individual pursuit
2nd Madison (with Kim Ok-cheol)

2019
1st Points race, Asian Track Championships (January)
Asian Track Championships (October)

1st Individual pursuit
2nd Team pursuit

2020
1st Madison, National Track Championships (with Cha Dong-heon)
2022
Asian Track Championships

2nd Individual pursuit
2nd Madison (with Min Kyeong-ho)
2nd Team pursuit
