= 2017 Asian Cycling Championships =

The 2017 Asian Cycling Championships may refer to:

- 2017 Asian Road Cycling Championships, a road cycling event held in Bahrain
- 2017 Asian Track Cycling Championships, a track cycling event held in India
