= Jiang Wenwen =

Jiang Wenwen is the name of:

- Jiang Wenwen (synchronised swimmer) (born 1986), Chinese synchronised swimmer
- Jiang Wenwen (cyclist) (born 1986), Chinese cyclist
