= Indonesia at the 2022 Asian Track Cycling Championships =

- Flag of Indonesia
- World Aquatics code: INA
- National federation: Indonesia Cycling Federation
- Website: indonesiacycling.org

in New Delhi, India
- Competitors: 6 in 9 events
- Medals Ranked 6th: Gold 0 Silver 2 Bronze 0 Total 2

Asian Track Cycling Championships appearances
- auto

Indonesia competed at the 2022 Asian Track Cycling Championships in New Delhi, India from 18 June to 22 June.

== Medalists ==
Medal	Name	Event	Date
Silver	Terry Kusuma Yudha	Men's scratch	June 22
Silver	Ayustina Delia Priatna	Women's omnium	June 20

== Sprint ==
Athlete	Event	Qualification		Round of 16	Quarterfinals	Semifinals	Final	
Athlete	Event	Time	Rank	Opposition Time	Opposition Time	Opposition Time	Opposition Time	Rank
Dhentaka Dika Alif	Men's sprint	10.812	13	Obara Yuta (JPN); L	Did not advance			13
Lestari Wiji	Women's sprint	11.984	9	Lute Mayuri Dhanraj (IND); L	Did not advance			10

== 1 km Time Trial ==
Athlete	Event	Final	
Athlete	Event	Time	Rank
Dhentaka Dika Alif	Men's 1 km Time Trial	1:07.172	7

== 500 m Time Trial ==
Athlete	Event	Final	
Athlete	Event	Time	Rank
Lestari Wiji	Women's 500 m Time Trial	36.894	5

== Keirin ==
Athlete	Event	1st Round	Repechage	Semifinals	Final
Athlete	Event	Rank	Rank	Rank	Rank
Dhentaka Dika Alif	Men's keirin	5 R	3 Q	5 FB	11
Lestari Wiji	Women's keirin	4 R	—N/a		

Qualification legend: FA=Gold medal final; FB=Bronze medal final

== Individual pursuit ==
Athlete	Event	Qualification		Final	
Athlete	Event	Time	Rank	Opponent Results	Rank
Cahyadi Aiman	Men's individual pursuit	4:46.841	8	Did not advance	

== Points Race ==
Athlete	Event	Lap points	Finish order	Points	Rank
Kusuma Terry Yudha	Men's points race	0	7	10	9
Ayustina Delia Priatna	Women's points race	DNS			

== Scratch ==
Athlete	Event	Rank
Kusuma Terry Yudha	Men's scratch	2nd place, silver medalist(s)
Ayustina Delia Priatna	Women's scratch	DNS

== Omnium ==
Athlete	Event	Scratch race		Tempo race		Elimination race		Subtotal Points race		Total points	Rank
Athlete	Event	Rank	Points	Rank	Points	Rank	Points	Rank	Points	Total points	Rank
Van Aert Bernard Benyamin	Men's omnium	2	38	6	30	4	34	5	102	113	5
Ayustina Delia Priatna	Women's omnium	5	32	6	30	4	34	5	96	123	2nd place, silver medalist(s)

== Madison ==
Athlete	Event	Points	Laps	Rank
Kusuma Terry Yudha; Van Aert Bernard Benyamin	Men's madison			
