= Georgia Simmerling =

Canadian skier and cyclist

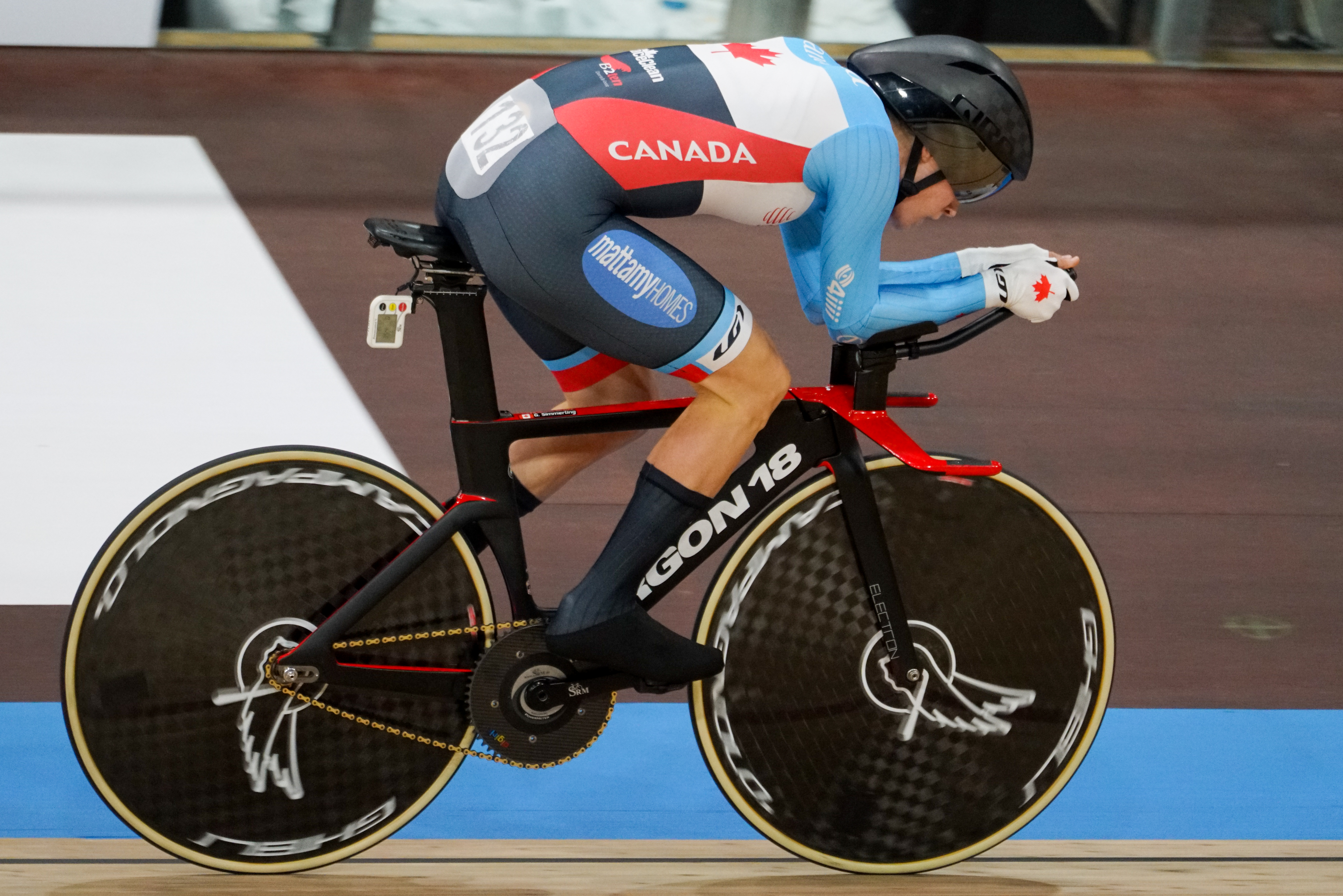
- Simmerling in 2020

Personal information
- Born: 11 March 1989 (age 37) Vancouver, British Columbia, Canada
- Height: 1.72 m (5 ft 8 in)
- Weight: 67 kg (148 lb)
- Cycling career
- Sport: Cycling
- Current team: Virginia's Blue Ridge–Twenty28
- Disciplines: Road bicycle racing; Track
- Role: Rider

Amateur team
- 2019: Sho-Air TWENTY20 Development Program

Professional team
- 2019–: Sho-Air Twenty20

Sport
- Club: Mont-Orignal, Lac-Etchemin
Medal record
Women's track cycling
Representing Canada
Olympic Games
Bronze medal – third place	2016 Rio de Janeiro	Team pursuit
World Championships
Silver medal – second place	2016 London	Team pursuit
Pan American Championships
Gold medal – first place	2019 Cochabamba	Individual pursuit
Gold medal – first place	2019 Cochabamba	Team pursuit

Georgia Simmerling (born 11 March 1989) is a Canadian road and track cyclist, who currently competes for UCI Women's Team Virginia's Blue Ridge–Twenty28. Simmerling has also previously competed in alpine skiing and skicross, and is the first Canadian to compete in three different sports in three different Olympic Games.

She won a bronze medal in team pursuit cycling at the 2016 Summer Olympics in Rio de Janeiro, and also won a silver medal in team pursuit at the 2016 World Championships.

She finished fourth overall in the team pursuit cycling event, representing Canada at the 2020 Summer Olympics.

== Athletics career ==
=== Alpine skiing ===
Simmerling represented Canada in alpine skiing at the Vancouver 2010 Olympic Winter Games, where her best result was a 27th place in the super giant slalom. She was a member of the Canadian Alpine Ski Team for the previous five years, however she suffered a catastrophic injury in 2011. Simmerling sustained a concussion as well as suffering MCL injuries in both knees.

=== Skicross ===
In the spring of 2011 Simmerling switched from alpine skiing to ski cross. During the next season she crashed out during a race and broke three vertebrae in her neck and back. She was in an upper body neck brace for seven weeks. She made her breakthrough during the 2013–14 World Cup season, taking seven top ten finishes on the World Cup and rounding out the season with consecutive third places in Åre and La Plagne. Simmerling competed for Canada at the 2014 Winter Olympics in ski cross where she placed 14th overall. The following season she scored second places in World Cup competitions on home snow in Nakiska and in the French resort of Val Thorens, finishing behind teammate Marielle Thompson both times. She started her return to ski cross competition in the 2016–17 World Cup with three ninth places and an eighth, before taking the first podium of her comeback when she finished third in the first of two rounds at Innichen, again behind Thompson.

=== Track cycling ===
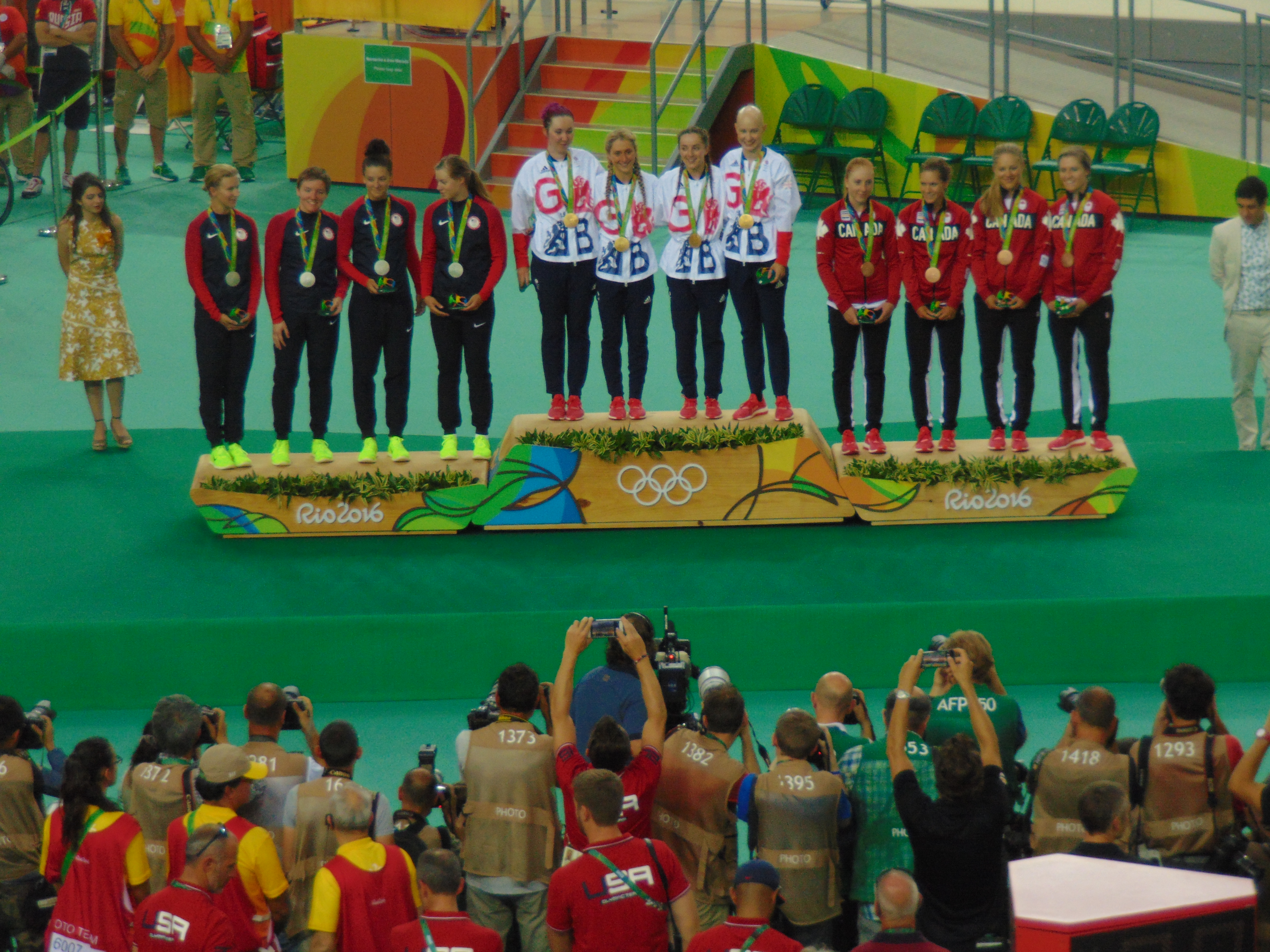
Winning the bronze medal at the 2016 Summer Olympics.

After suffering a wrist injury in ski cross competition, Simmerling switched to competitive track cycling. After having plates and screws inserted in her wrist from her surgery, she started training on the bike within a week of the injury. Simmerling won a gold medal in team pursuit on her debut on the World Cup tour with Jasmin Glaesser, Laura Brown, and Steph Roorda. She went on to win silver at the 2015 UCI Track World Championships with Glaesser and new teammates Allison Beveridge and Kirsti Lay.

Simmerling participated as part of Canada's 2016 Olympic team in track cycling. She became the first Canadian athlete to compete at the Olympics in three different sports. There, she cycled to a bronze medal in the team pursuit with Glaesser, Beveridge, Lay, and Brown. After the win, she announced that she would begin training for ski cross again at the 2018 Winter Olympics. She remains invested in cycling, having competed at the 2020 Summer Olympics and finishing fourth overall in the team pursuit.

== Personal life ==
Simmerling has been in a relationship with Stephanie Labbé since 2016. They were engaged in August 2021.
