= Kie Furuyama =

Japanese cyclist (born 1997)

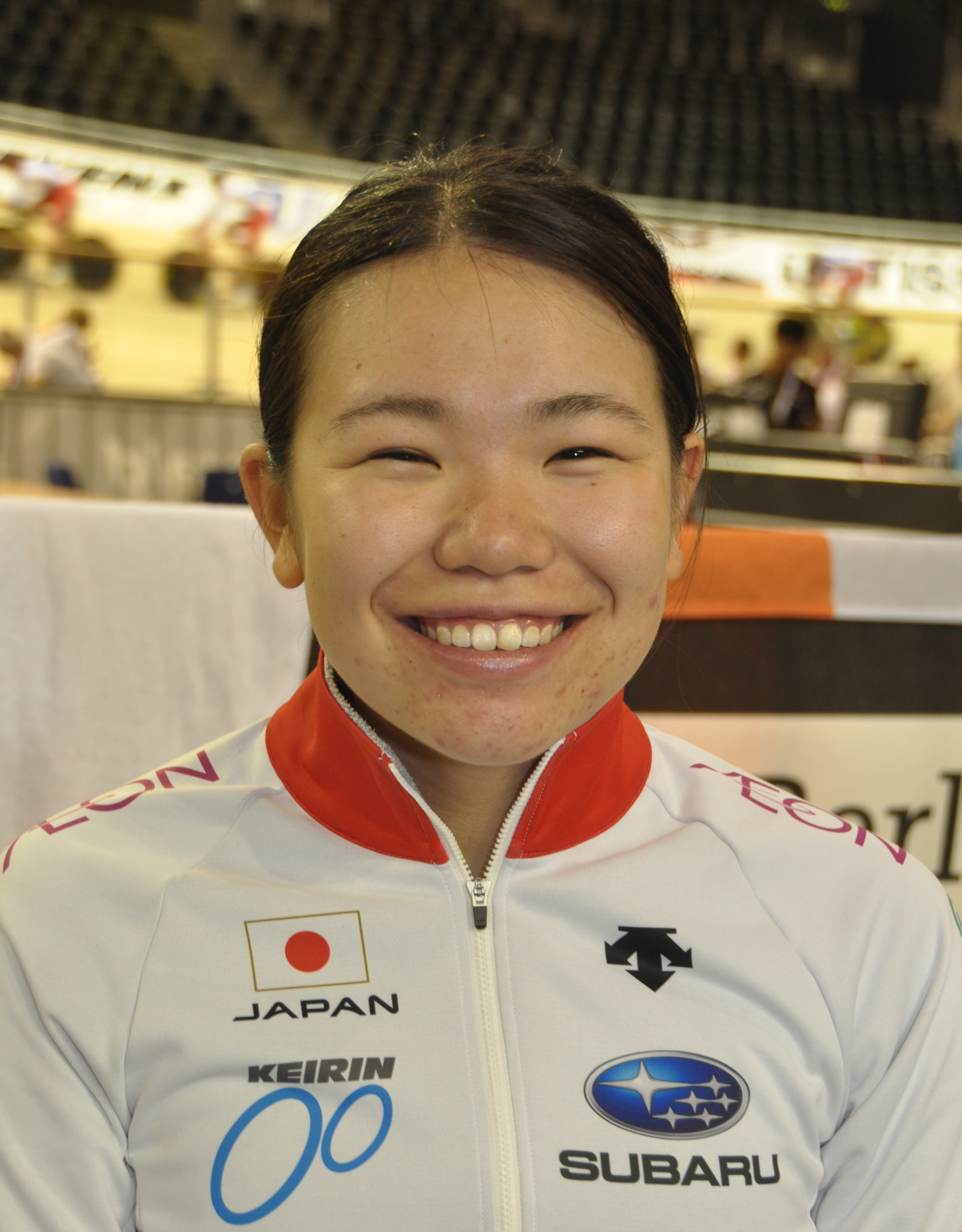
- Furuyama in November 2018

Personal information
- Born: 21 July 1997 (age 29) Ōta, Tokyo, Japan

Cycling career
- Sport: Cycling
- Discipline: Track cycling
- Role: Rider

Professional teams
- –2021: Nippon Sport Science University
- 2021–2023: Team Rakuten K Dreams
Medal record
Representing Japan
Female's track cycling
World Junior Championships
| Bronze medal – third place | 2015 Astana | Team pursuit |
Asian Championships
| Bronze medal – third place | 2017 New Delhi | Madison |
| Gold medal – first place | 2018 Nilai | Team pursuit |
| Gold medal – first place | 2019 Jakarta | Madison |
| Silver medal – second place | 2019 Jakarta | Team pursuit |
| Gold medal – first place | 2020 Jincheon | Scratch |
| Bronze medal – third place | 2020 Jincheon | Team pursuit |
| Gold medal – first place | 2022 New Delhi | Madison |
| Silver medal – second place | 2022 New Delhi | Individual pursuit |
| Silver medal – second place | 2022 New Delhi | Scratch |

Kie Furuyama (古山稀絵, Furuyama Kie; born 21 July 1997) is a Japanese former racing cyclist. At professional level, she formerly represented Team Rakuten K Dreams. She was also a member of the Japanese national cycling team. She retired from professional competition in November 2023.

Furuyama won a silver medal at Individual pursuit and a bronze medal in the Madison races at the 2021 UCI Track Cycling Nations Cup.

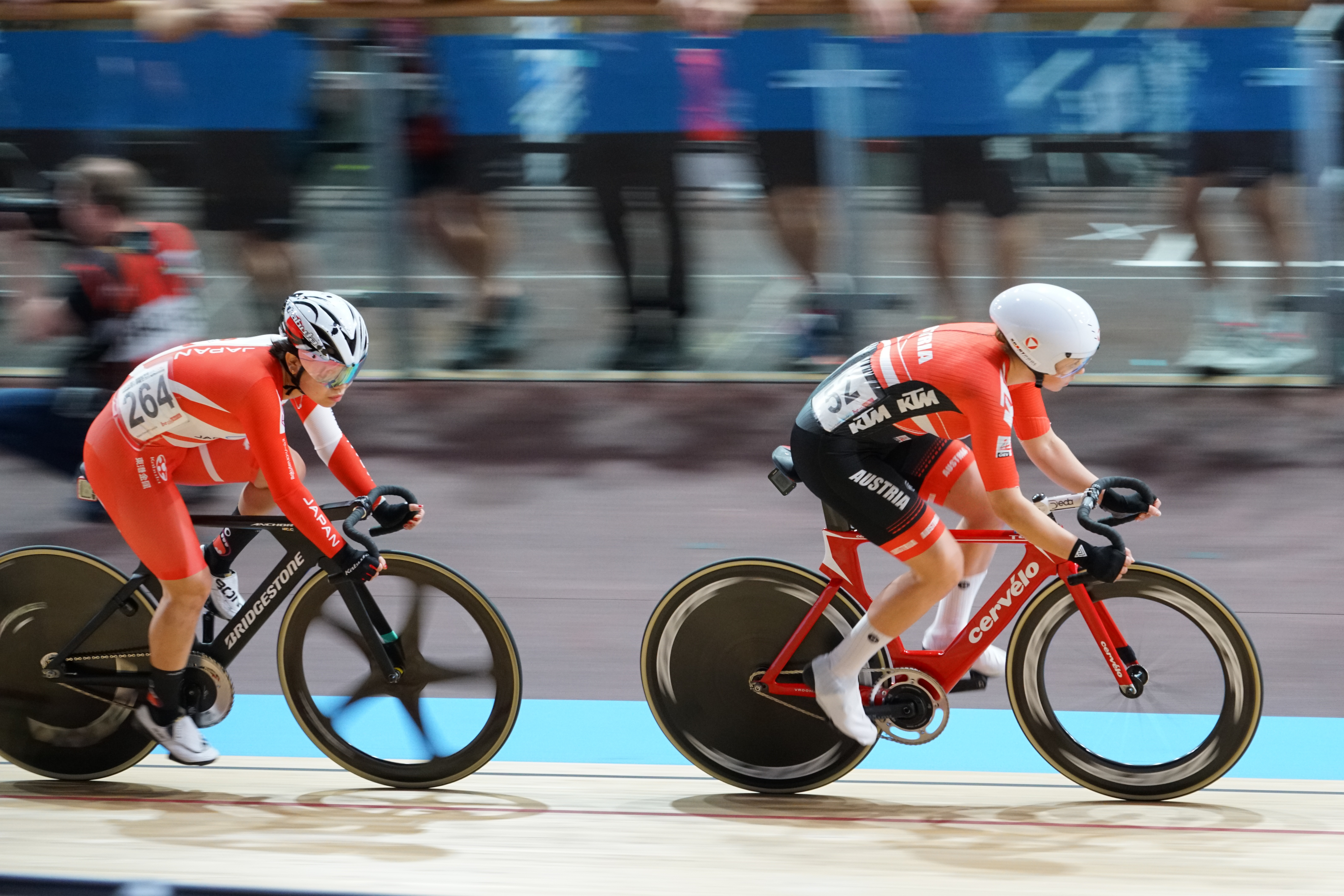
Furuyama (left) at the 2020 Asian Track Cycling Championships.
