= Chen Lulu =

Chinese cyclist

Personal information
- Born: 25 August 1997 (age 29)

Cycling career
- Sport: Cycling
- Discipline: Track cycling
- Role: Rider
Medal record
Women's track cycling
Representing China
Asian Championships
Gold medal – first place	2016 Izu	team pursuit

Chen Lulu (born 25 August 1997) is a Chinese female track cyclist. She won the gold medal in the team pursuit at the 2016 Asian Cycling Championships.

== Major results ==
2016
1st Team Pursuit, Asian Track Championships (with Huang Dong Yan, Ma Menglu and Wang Hong)
