= Son Eun-ju =

South Korean cyclist

Personal information
- Born: 2 June 1990 (age 36)

Cycling career
- Sport: Cycling
- Disciplines: Track; Road
- Role: Rider
Medal record
Representing South Korea
Women's road bicycle racing
Asian Championships
Gold medal – first place	2010 Sharjah	Individual time trial
Silver medal – second place	2011 Nakhon Ratchasima	Individual time trial
Women's track cycling
Asian Championships
Silver medal – second place	2017 New Delhi	Madison
Bronze medal – third place	2016 Izu	Individual pursuit
Bronze medal – third place	2016 Izu	Team pursuit
Bronze medal – third place	2017 New Delhi	Team pursuit

Son Eun-ju (born 2 June 1990) is a South Korean road and track cyclist. She won the bronze medal in the team pursuit and in the individual pursuit at the 2016 Asian Cycling Championships.

== Major results ==
2009
6th Road race, East Asian Games
2010
1st Time trial, Asian Road Championships
2011
2nd Time trial, Asian Road Championships
2015
2nd Road race, National Road Championships
2016
Asian Track Championships

3rd Individual pursuit
3rd Team pursuit (with Lee Ju-hee, Kang Hyeong-Yeong and Kim You-ri)

2017
Asian Track Championships

2nd Madison (with Kang Hyeong-Yeong)
3rd Team pursuit (with Lee Ju-mi, Kang Hyeong-Yeong and Kim You-ri)
