= 2020 Asian Track Cycling Championships =

- Venue: Jincheon, South Korea
- Date(s): 17–21 October 2019
- Velodrome: Jincheon National Training Center Velodrome

The 2020 Asian Track Cycling Championships (40th edition) took place at the Jincheon National Training Center Velodrome in Jincheon, South Korea from 17 to 21 October 2019. Although the event was planned for 2020, it was brought forward to October 2019 because of the 2020 Summer Olympics qualification timeline.

== Medal summary ==
=== Men ===
| Event | Gold | Silver | Bronze |
|---|---|---|---|
| Sprint | Azizulhasni Awang; Malaysia | Yuta Wakimoto; Japan | Tomohiro Fukaya; Japan |
| 1 km time trial | Andrey Chugay; Kazakhstan | Fadhil Zonis; Malaysia | Liu Qi; China |
| Keirin | Yuta Wakimoto; Japan | Azizulhasni Awang; Malaysia | Yudai Nitta; Japan |
| Individual pursuit | Park Sang-hoon; South Korea | Alisher Zhumakan; Kazakhstan | Min Kyeong-ho; South Korea |
| Points race | Kim Eu-ro; South Korea | Bernard Van Aert; Indonesia | Roman Vassilenkov; Kazakhstan |
| Scratch | Mow Ching Yin; Hong Kong | Alisher Zhumakan; Kazakhstan | Bernard Van Aert; Indonesia |
| Omnium | Eiya Hashimoto; Japan | Artyom Zakharov; Kazakhstan | Shin Dong-in; South Korea |
| Madison | South Korea; Shin Dong-in; Kim Eu-ro | Japan; Eiya Hashimoto; Kazushige Kuboki | Kazakhstan; Artyom Zakharov; Roman Vassilenkov |
| Team sprint | Japan; Kazuki Amagai; Yudai Nitta; Tomohiro Fukaya | China; Zhou Yu; Luo Yongjia; Zhang Miao | South Korea; Kim Dong-ha; Kim Cheng-su; Seok Hye-yun |
| Team pursuit | Japan; Ryo Chikatani; Shunsuke Imamura; Kazushige Kuboki; Keitaro Sawada; Eiya Hashimoto | South Korea; Park Sang-hoon; Shin Dong-in; Min Kyeong-ho; Im Jae-yeon; Jang Hun | Hong Kong; Mow Ching Yin; Leung Ka Yu; Cheung King Lok; Leung Chun Wing |

=== Women ===
| Event | Gold | Silver | Bronze |
|---|---|---|---|
| Sprint | Lee Wai Sze; Hong Kong | Zhong Tianshi; China | Yuka Kobayashi; Japan |
| 500 m time trial | Chen Feifei; China | Kim Soo-hyun; South Korea | Fatehah Mustapa; Malaysia |
| Keirin | Lee Wai Sze; Hong Kong | Yuka Kobayashi; Japan | Lee Hye-jin; South Korea |
| Individual pursuit | Lee Ju-mi; South Korea | Leung Bo Yee; Hong Kong | Luo Yiwei; Singapore |
| Points race | Olga Zabelinskaya; Uzbekistan | Na Ah-reum; South Korea | Leung Bo Yee; Hong Kong |
| Scratch | Kie Furuyama; Japan | Rinata Sultanova; Kazakhstan | Shen Shanrong; China |
| Omnium | Yumi Kajihara; Japan | Wang Xiaofei; China | Lee Sze Wing; Hong Kong |
| Madison | Hong Kong; Yang Qianyu; Pang Yao | China; Wang Xiaofei; Liu Jiali | South Korea; Yu Seon-ha; Na Ah-reum |
| Team sprint | China; Zhuang Wei; Zhang Linyin; Chen Feifei | South Korea; Kim Soo-hyun; Lee Hye-jin | Malaysia; Fatehah Mustapa; Anis Amira Rosidi |
| Team pursuit | South Korea; Lee Ju-mi; Na Ah-reum; Kim Hyun-ji; Jang Su-ji | China; Wang Xiaofei; Liu Jiali; Cao Yuan; Huang Zhilin | Japan; Yumi Kajihara; Kie Furuyama; Kisato Nakamura; Nao Suzuki |

== Medal table ==
| Rank | Nation | Gold | Silver | Bronze | Total |
|---|---|---|---|---|---|
| 1 | Japan | 6 | 3 | 4 | 13 |
| 2 | South Korea | 5 | 4 | 5 | 14 |
| 3 | Hong Kong | 4 | 1 | 3 | 8 |
| 4 | China | 2 | 5 | 2 | 9 |
| 5 | Kazakhstan | 1 | 4 | 2 | 7 |
| 6 | Malaysia | 1 | 2 | 2 | 5 |
| 7 | Uzbekistan | 1 | 0 | 0 | 1 |
| 8 | Indonesia | 0 | 1 | 1 | 2 |
| 9 | Singapore | 0 | 0 | 1 | 1 |
| Totals (9 entries) | | 20 | 20 | 20 | 60 |
