= Liu Jiali =

Chinese cyclist (born 1994)

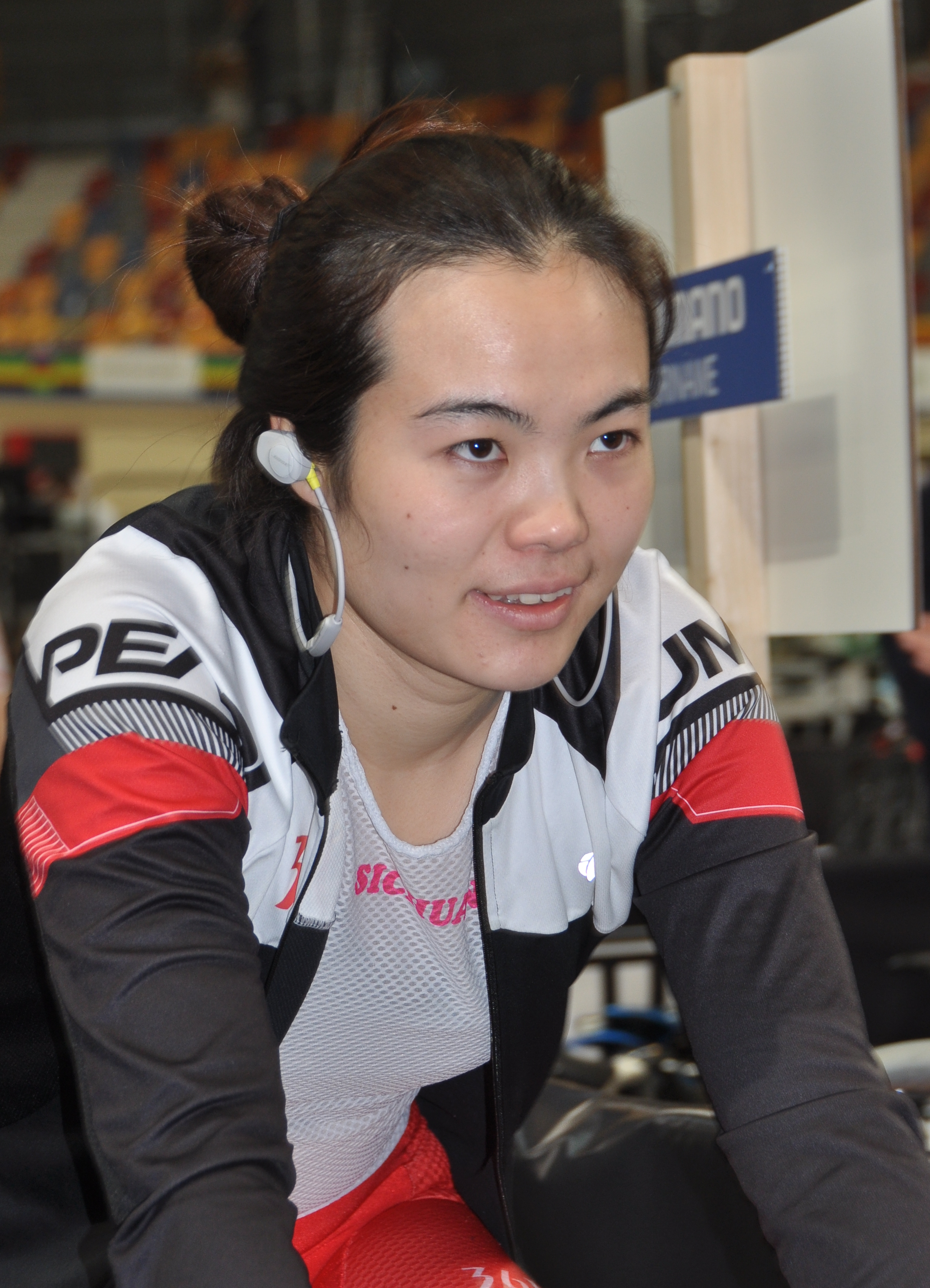
- Liu in 2018

Personal information
- Born: 6 April 1994 (age 32) Deyang, Sichuan, China
- Height: 1.67 m (5 ft 6 in)

Cycling career
- Sport: Cycling
- Current team: China Liv Pro Cycling
- Disciplines: Road; Track
- Role: Rider

Professional team
- 2017–: China Chongming–Liv
Medal record
Women's track cycling
Representing China
Asian Games
Silver medal – second place	2018 Jakarta-Palembang	Team pursuit
Bronze medal – third place	2018 Jakarta-Palembang	Madison
Bronze medal – third place	2022 Hangzhou	Omnium
Asian Championships
Gold medal – first place	2023 Nilai	Points race
Gold medal – first place	2024 New Delhi	Scratch
Silver medal – second place	2020 Jincheon	Madison
Silver medal – second place	2020 Jincheon	Team pursuit
Silver medal – second place	2023 Nilai	Scratch
Silver medal – second place	2024 New Delhi	Omnium
Bronze medal – third place	2019 Jakarta	Team pursuit

Liu Jiali (Chinese: 刘佳丽; pinyin: Liú Jiālì; born 6 April 1994) is a Chinese professional racing cyclist, who currently rides for UCI Women's Continental Team China Liv Pro Cycling.
