= Miho Yoshikawa =

Japanese cyclist

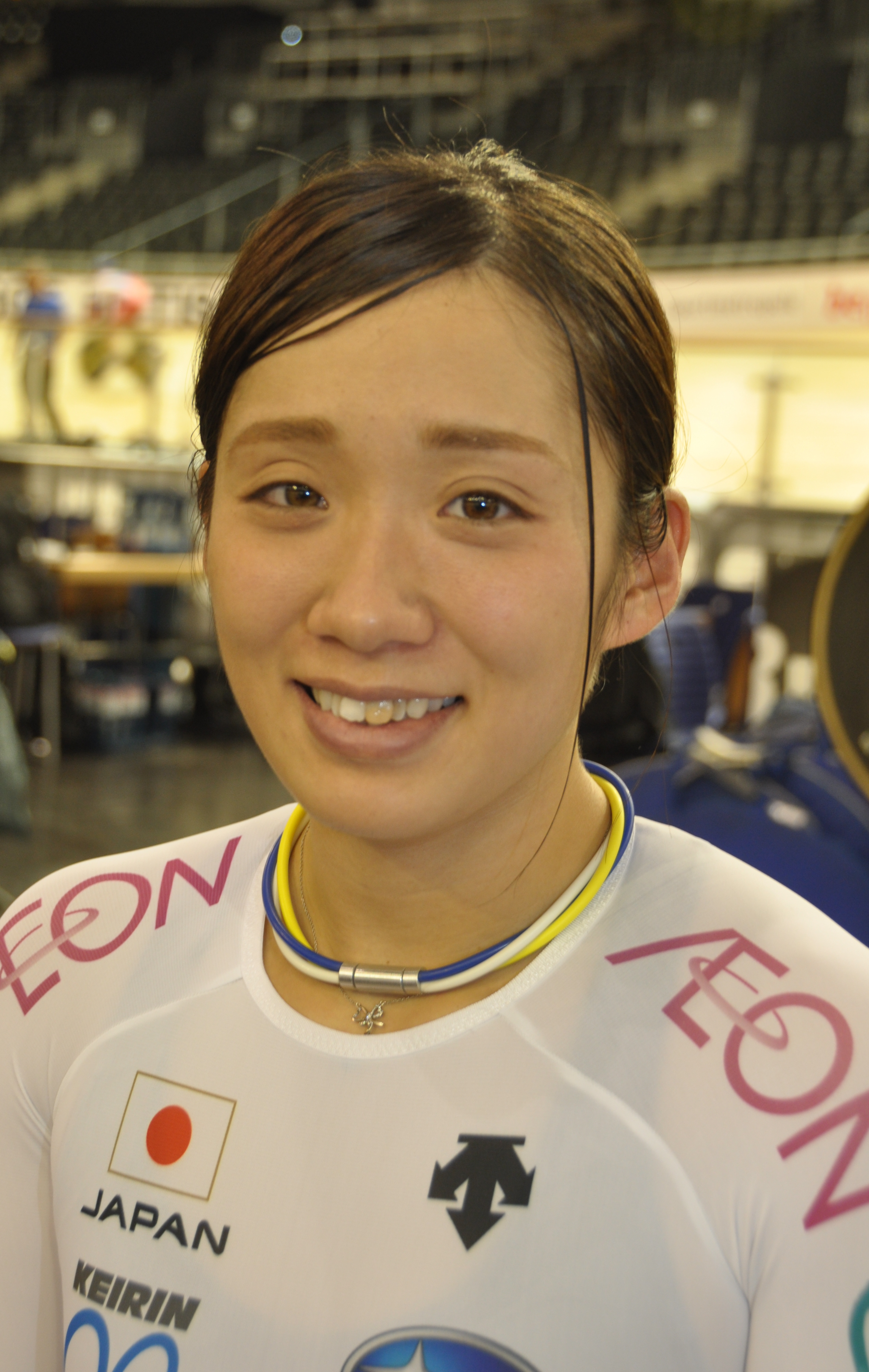
- Yoshikawa in 2018

Personal information
- Full name: Miho Yoshikawa
- Born: 15 January 1993 (age 33)

Cycling career
- Sport: Cycling
- Disciplines: Road; Track
- Role: Rider

Amateur teams
- 2015: Asahi Team
- 2016: Live Garden Bici Stelle

Professional teams
- 2017: Bizkaia–Durango
- 2019: Bizkaia–Durango
Medal record
Representing Japan
Women's cycling
Asian Games
| Bronze medal – third place | 2018 Jakarta-Palembang | Team pursuit |
Asian Championships
| Silver medal – second place | 2019 Jakarta | Team pursuit |
| Bronze medal – third place | 2017 Manama | Road race |

Miho Yoshikawa (吉川 美穂, Yoshikawa Miho; born 15 January 1993) is a Japanese professional racing cyclist, who last rode for UCI Women's Team Bizkaia–Durango. She rode in the women's road race at the 2016 UCI Road World Championships, finishing in 21st place.

== Major results ==
2014
9th Overall Tour of Thailand
2015
5th Overall The Princess Maha Chackri Sirindhon's Cup
2016
6th Overall Tour of Thailand
2017
3rd Road race, Asian Road Championships
2018
3rd Team pursuit, Asian Games
4th Road race, Asian Road Championships
2019
2nd Team pursuit, Asian Track Championships
