= Lee Ju-mi =

South Korean cyclist (born 1989)

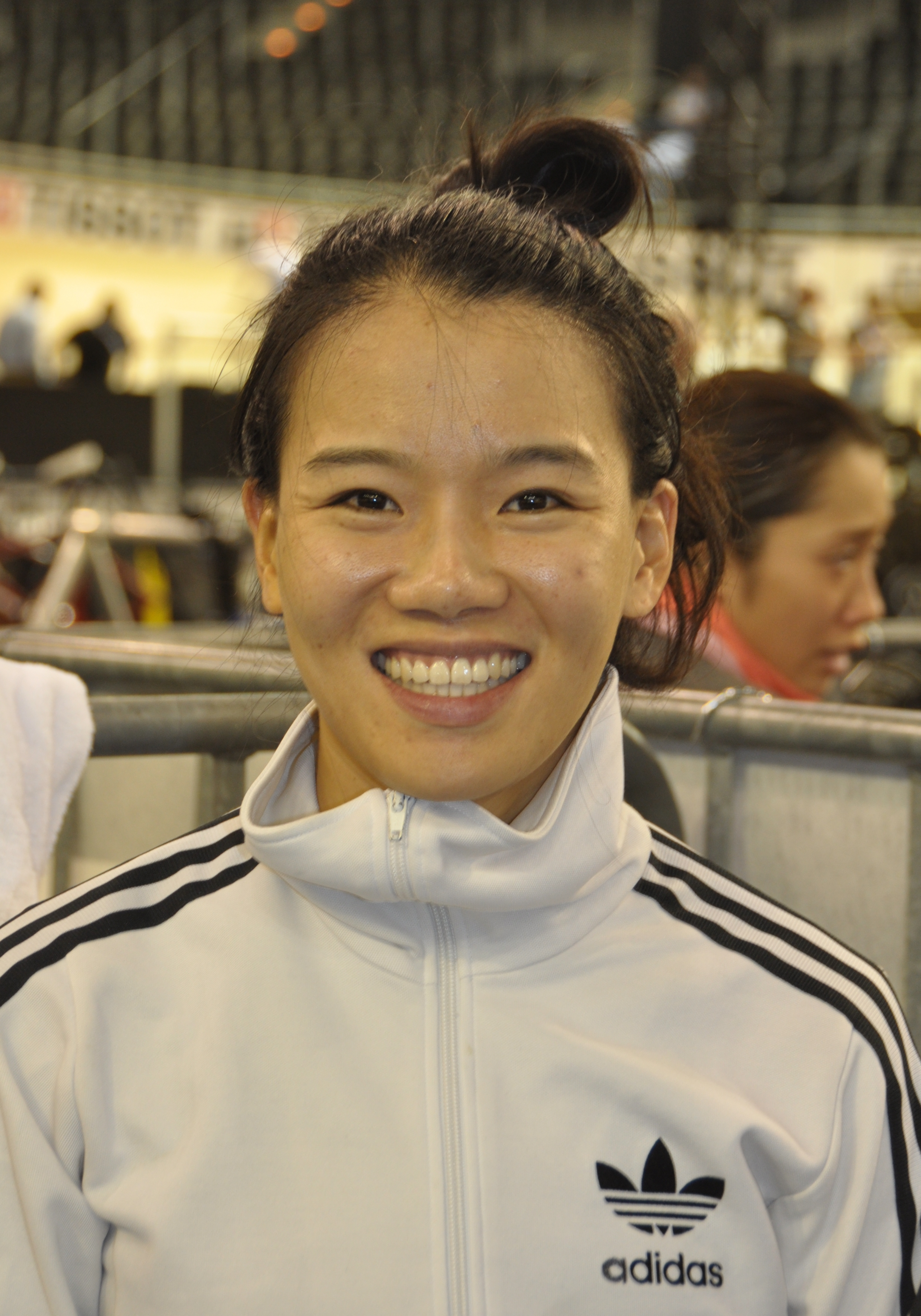
- Lee in 2018

Personal information
- Born: 24 April 1989 (age 37)

Cycling career
- Sport: Cycling
- Disciplines: Road; Track
- Role: Rider
Medal record
Representing South Korea
Women's track cycling
Asian Games
Gold medal – first place	2018 Jakarta-Palembang	Individual pursuit
Gold medal – first place	2018 Jakarta-Palembang	Team pursuit
Silver medal – second place	2014 Incheon	Team pursuit
Bronze medal – third place	2022 Hangzhou	Madison
Asian Championships
Gold medal – first place	2011 Nakhon Ratchasima	Individual pursuit
Gold medal – first place	2017 New Delhi	Individual pursuit
Gold medal – first place	2018 Nilai	Individual pursuit
Gold medal – first place	2019 Jakarta	Individual pursuit
Gold medal – first place	2019 Jakarta	Team pursuit
Gold medal – first place	2020 Incheon	Individual pursuit
Gold medal – first place	2020 Incheon	Team pursuit
Gold medal – first place	2022 New Delhi	Individual pursuit
Gold medal – first place	2022 New Delhi	Team pursuit
Silver medal – second place	2014 Astana	Team pursuit
Silver medal – second place	2023 Nilai	Individual pursuit
Silver medal – second place	2023 Nilai	Madison
Bronze medal – third place	2017 New Delhi	Team pursuit
Bronze medal – third place	2018 Nilai	Team pursuit
Bronze medal – third place	2023 Nilai	Team pursuit
Women's road racing
Asian Championships
Gold medal – first place	2018 Naypyidaw	Individual time trial
Silver medal – second place	2016 Izu	Individual time trial
Silver medal – second place	2017 Manama	Individual time trial
Silver medal – second place	2019 Tashkent	Individual time trial

Lee Ju-mi (born 24 April 1989) is a South Korean road and track cyclist. She won the silver medal in the time trial at the Asian Cycling Championships in 2016, 2017 and 2019, and won the gold medal in 2018.

== Major results ==
=== Track ===
2011
1st Individual pursuit, Asian Track Championships
2014
2nd Team pursuit, Asian Games (with Lee Chaek-Yung, Lee Min-hye, Na A-reum, Son Hee-jung and Kim You-ri)
2nd Team pursuit, Asian Track Championships (with Lee Min-hye, Na A-reum and Kim You-ri)
2016
1st Omnium, Yangyang International Track Competition
2017
Asian Track Championships

1st Individual pursuit
3rd Team pursuit (with Kang Hyeong-Yeong, Kim You-ri and Son Eun-ju)

2018
Asian Games

1st Individual pursuit
1st Team pursuit

Asian Track Championships

1st Individual pursuit
3rd Team pursuit

2019
Asian Track Championships (January)

1st Individual pursuit
1st Team pursuit

Asian Track Championships (October)

1st Individual pursuit
1st Team pursuit

3rd Team pursuit, 2019–20 UCI Track Cycling World Cup, Hong Kong
2021
2nd Team pursuit, National Track Championships
2022
Asian Track Championships

1st Individual pursuit
1st Team pursuit

=== Road ===
2013
4th Road race, National Road Championships
2015
National Road Championships

1st Time trial,
4th Road race

2016
National Road Championships

1st Road race
1st Time trial

2nd Time trial, Asian Road Championships
2017
National Road Championships

1st Time trial
3rd Road race

2nd Time trial, Asian Road Championships
2018
1st Time trial, Asian Road Championships
National Road Championships

2nd Road race
2nd Time trial

8th Road race, Asian Games
2019
Asian Road Championships

1st Team time trial
2nd Time trial
9th Road race

National Road Championships

1st Road race
1st Time trial

2020
1st Time trial, National Road Championships
2021
National Road Championships

4th Time trial,
4th Road race
