= Cycling at the 2018 Asian Games – Women's individual pursuit =

Women's individual pursuit at the 2018 Asian Games
- Venue: Jakarta International Velodrome
- Date: 30 August 2018
- Competitors: 10 from 10 nations

Medalists
gold medal	Lee Ju-mi	South Korea
silver medal	Wang Hong	China
bronze medal	Huang Ting-ying	Chinese Taipei

The women's individual pursuit competition at the 2018 Asian Games was held on 30 August at the Jakarta International Velodrome.

== Schedule ==
All times are Western Indonesia Time (UTC+07:00)

Date	Time	Event
Thursday, 30 August 2018	09:56	Qualifying
Thursday, 30 August 2018	16:27	Finals

== Records ==
Prior to this competition, the existing world, Asian and Games records were as follows.

World Record	Chloé Dygert (USA)	3:20.060	Apeldoorn, Netherlands	3 March 2018
Asian Record	Lee Ju-mi (KOR)	3:34.198	Nilai, Malaysia	18 February 2018
Games Record	Jiang Fan (CHN)	3:37.105	Guangzhou, China	14 November 2010

== Results ==
=== Qualifying ===
Rank	Athlete	Time	Notes
1	Lee Ju-mi (KOR)	3:33.048	AR
2	Wang Hong (CHN)	3:40.967	
3	Ayustina Delia Priatna (INA)	3:43.387	
4	Huang Ting-ying (TPE)	3:43.917	
5	Leung Bo Yee (HKG)	3:47.570	
6	Kisato Nakamura (JPN)	3:50.604	
7	Luo Yiwei (SGP)	3:51.700	
8	Supaksorn Nuntana (THA)	3:52.834	
9	Renata Baymetova (UZB)	4:02.416	
10	Chaoba Devi Elangbam (IND)	4:05.298	

=== Finals ===
==== Bronze ====
Rank	Athlete	Time	Notes
3rd place, bronze medalist(s)	Huang Ting-ying (TPE)	3:45.449	
4	Ayustina Delia Priatna (INA)	3:49.960	

==== Gold ====
Rank	Athlete	Time	Notes
1st place, gold medalist(s)	Lee Ju-mi (KOR)		
2nd place, silver medalist(s)	Wang Hong (CHN)	Overlapped	
