= Cycling at the 2018 Asian Games – Women's madison =

Women's madison at the 2018 Asian Games
- Venue: Jakarta International Velodrome
- Date: 31 August 2018
- Competitors: 12 from 6 nations

Medalists
gold medal	Kim You-ri; Na Ah-reum	South Korea
silver medal	Yang Qianyu; Pang Yao	Hong Kong
bronze medal	Liu Jiali; Wang Xiaofei	China

The women's madison competition at the 2018 Asian Games was held on 31 August at the Jakarta International Velodrome.

== Schedule ==
All times are Western Indonesia Time (UTC+07:00)

Date	Time	Event
Friday, 31 August 2018	13:00	Final

== Results ==
Rank	Team	Sprint										Laps		Total	Finish order
Rank	Team	1	2	3	4	5	6	7	8	9	10	+	−	Total	Finish order
1st place, gold medalist(s)	South Korea (KOR); Kim You-ri; Na Ah-reum	1	5	5	5	3	5	2	5	5		40		76	6
2nd place, silver medalist(s)	Hong Kong (HKG); Yang Qianyu; Pang Yao	5	1	2	2	1	3	5	1	1		40		61	5
3rd place, bronze medalist(s)	China (CHN); Liu Jiali; Wang Xiaofei	3	3	3	3		2	1	3	3	10			31	1
4	Japan (JPN); Yuya Hashimoto; Yumi Kajihara				1	2		3	2		6			14	2
5	Thailand (THA); Supaksorn Nuntana; Jutatip Maneephan		2	1		5	1			2	2			13	4
6	Indonesia (INA); Ayustina Delia Priatna; Liontin Evangelina Setiawan	2									4		20	−14	3
