= Wang Hong (cyclist) =

Chinese cyclist

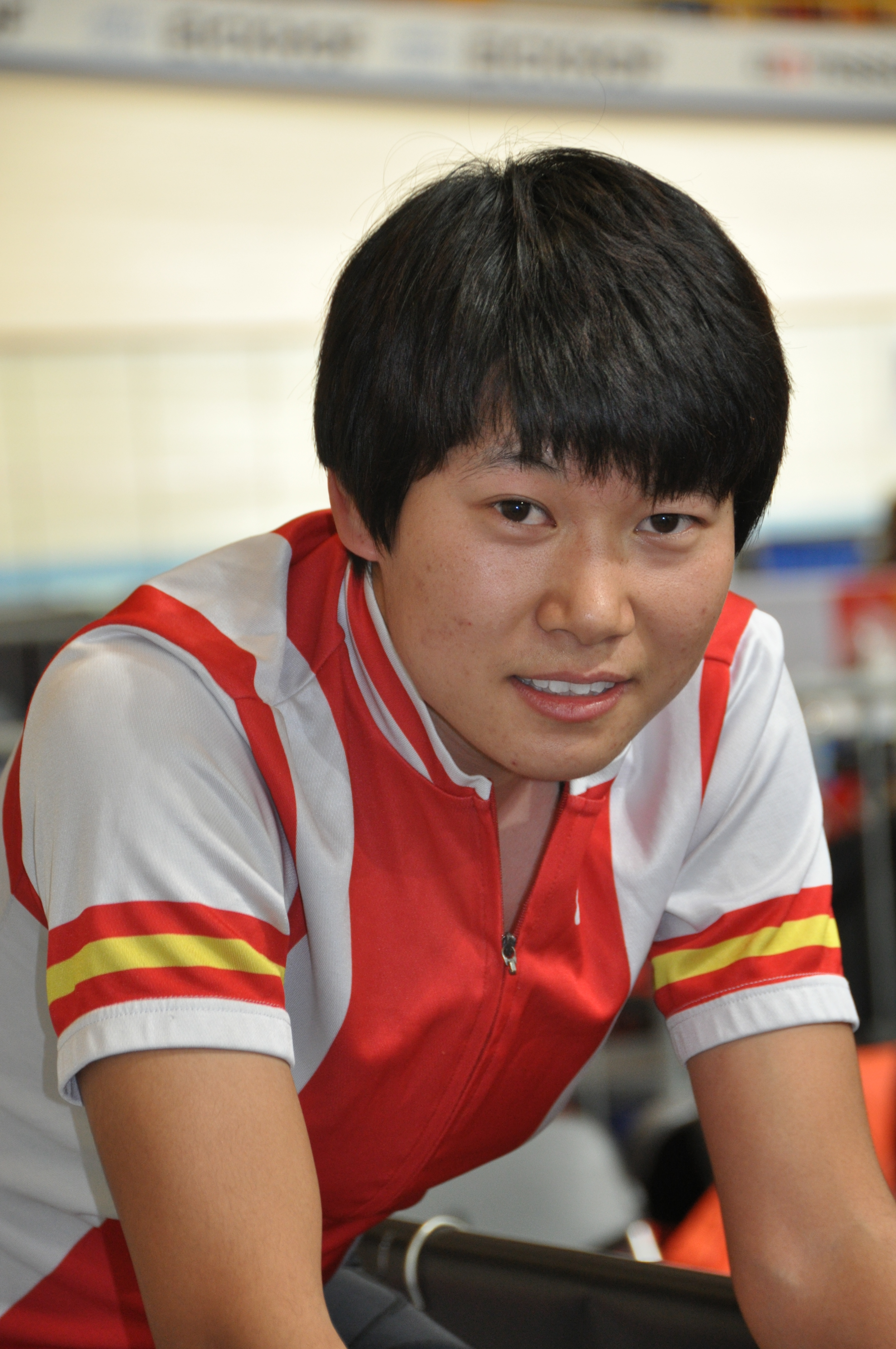
- Wang Hong (2016)

Personal information
- Born: 27 January 1997 (age 29)

Cycling career
- Sport: Cycling
- Discipline: Track cycling
- Role: Rider
Medal record
Representing China
Women's track cycling
Asian Games
Silver medal – second place	2018 Jakarta-Palembang	Individual pursuit
Silver medal – second place	2018 Jakarta-Palembang	Team pursuit
Asian Championships
Gold medal – first place	2016 Izu	Team pursuit
Silver medal – second place	2018 Nilai	Team pursuit
Bronze medal – third place	2019 Jakarta	Individual pursuit
Bronze medal – third place	2019 Jakarta	Team pursuit

Wang Hong (Chinese: 王红; pinyin: Wáng Hóng, born 27 January 1997) is a Chinese female track cyclist. She won the gold medal in the team pursuit at the 2016 Asian Cycling Championships.

== Major results ==
2016
1st Team Pursuit, Asian Track Championships (with Chen Lulu, Huang Dongyan and Ma Menglu)
2017
1st Team Pursuit, National Track Championships (with Huang Dongyan, Jing Yali and Ma Menglu)
