= Khoiful Mukhib =

Indonesian cyclist

Personal information
- Born: 15 December 1990 (age 35) Jepara, Central Java

Cycling career
- Sport: Cycling
Medal record
Men's cycling
Representing Indonesia
Asian Games
Gold medal – first place	2018 Jakarta	downhill

Khoiful Mukhib (born 15 December 1990) is an Indonesian male mountain cyclist. In the 2018 Asian Games, he won a gold medal for downhill cycling after scoring a time of 2 minutes, 16.687 seconds.

He was born in Jepara, Central Java on 15 December 1990. After receiving his first BMX bike in his 6th grade of elementary school, he began taking part in junior races in 2002, and by 2007 he won second place at the BMX ASEAN Championship held in Malang. He married his wife in 2017, and she was pregnant during the Asian Games. Before participating in the games, he had won several national competitions as part of the 76 team, which he joined in 2009.
