= Jiang Wenwen (cyclist) =

Chinese track cyclist (born 1986)

Jiang Wenwen (Chinese: 姜吻吻, born 23 November 1986 in Longkou, Shandong) is a Chinese track cyclist. At the 2012 Summer Olympics, she competed in the Women's team pursuit for the national team.

== Major results ==
- (silver) 2011-2012 Track Cycling World Cup in Astana - Team pursuit

2014
1st Team Pursuit, 2014 Asian Track Championships (with Huang Dongyan, Jing Yali and Zhao Baofang)
1st Team Pursuit, Asian Games (with Huang Dongyan, Jing Yali and Zhao Baofang)
2015
1st Team Pursuit, Asian Track Championships (with Huang Dongyan, Jing Yali and Zhao Baofang)
