= 2019 Asian Track Cycling Championships =

- Venue: Jakarta, Indonesia
- Date(s): 9–13 January 2019
- Velodrome: Jakarta International Velodrome

The 2019 Asian Track Cycling Championships took place at the Jakarta International Velodrome in Jakarta, Indonesia from 9 to 13 January 2019.

== Medal summary ==
=== Men ===
| Event | Gold | Silver | Bronze |
|---|---|---|---|
| Sprint | Azizulhasni Awang; Malaysia | Xu Chao; China | Shah Firdaus Sahrom; Malaysia |
| 1 km time trial | Sergey Ponomaryov; Kazakhstan | Hsiao Shih-hsin; Chinese Taipei | Kim Jun-cheol; South Korea |
| Keirin | Yuta Wakimoto; Japan | Shah Firdaus Sahrom; Malaysia | Tomoyuki Kawabata; Japan |
| Individual pursuit | Min Kyeong-ho; South Korea | Alisher Zhumakan; Kazakhstan | Li Wen-chao; Chinese Taipei |
| Points race | Park Sang-hoon; South Korea | Artyom Zakharov; Kazakhstan | Muradjan Khalmuratov; Uzbekistan |
| Scratch | Patompob Phonarjthan; Thailand | Batsaikhany Tegshbayar; Mongolia | Leung Ka Yu; Hong Kong |
| Omnium | Eiya Hashimoto; Japan | Yousif Mirza; United Arab Emirates | Shin Dong-in; South Korea |
| Madison | South Korea; Im Jae-yeon; Kim Ok-cheol | China; Guo Liang; Shen Pingan | Japan; Eiya Hashimoto; Kazushige Kuboki |
| Team sprint | Japan; Kazuki Amagai; Yudai Nitta; Tomohiro Fukaya; Kazunari Watanabe | China; Guo Shuai; Xu Chao; Zhou Yu | Malaysia; Azizulhasni Awang; Fadhil Zonis; Shah Firdaus Sahrom |
| Team pursuit | South Korea; Im Jae-yeon; Kim Ok-cheol; Min Kyeong-ho; Shin Dong-in | Japan; Ryo Chikatani; Eiya Hashimoto; Shogo Ichimaru; Kazushige Kuboki | Kazakhstan; Robert Gaineyev; Roman Vassilenkov; Artyom Zakharov; Alisher Zhumakan |

=== Women ===
| Event | Gold | Silver | Bronze |
|---|---|---|---|
| Sprint | Lee Wai Sze; Hong Kong | Zhong Tianshi; China | Lee Hye-jin; South Korea |
| 500 m time trial | Lin Junhong; China | Kim Soo-hyun; South Korea | Crismonita Dwi Putri; Indonesia |
| Keirin | Yuka Kobayashi; Japan | Lee Wai Sze; Hong Kong | Zhong Tianshi; China |
| Individual pursuit | Lee Ju-mi; South Korea | Olga Zabelinskaya; Uzbekistan | Wang Hong; China |
| Points race | Olga Zabelinskaya; Uzbekistan | Huang Ting-ying; Chinese Taipei | Zhang Ying; China |
| Scratch | Huang Ting-ying; Chinese Taipei | Shen Shanrong; China | Pang Yao; Hong Kong |
| Omnium | Yumi Kajihara; Japan | Huang Ting-ying; Chinese Taipei | Olga Zabelinskaya; Uzbekistan |
| Madison | Japan; Kie Furuyama; Yumi Kajihara | South Korea; Kim You-ri; Na Ah-reum | Uzbekistan; Ekaterina Knebeleva; Olga Zabelinskaya |
| Team sprint | China; Lin Junhong; Zhong Tianshi; Guo Yufang | South Korea; Kim Soo-hyun; Lee Hye-jin | Hong Kong; Lee Wai Sze; Ma Wing Yu |
| Team pursuit | South Korea; Kim You-ri; Jang Su-ji; Lee Ju-mi; Na Ah-reum | Japan; Kie Furuyama; Yumi Kajihara; Kisato Nakamura; Miho Yoshikawa | China; Liu Jiali; Wang Xiaofei; Wang Hong; Chen Qiaolin; Shen Shanrong |

== Medal table ==
| Rank | Nation | Gold | Silver | Bronze | Total |
|---|---|---|---|---|---|
| 1 | South Korea | 6 | 3 | 3 | 12 |
| 2 | Japan | 6 | 2 | 2 | 10 |
| 3 | China | 2 | 5 | 4 | 11 |
| 4 | Chinese Taipei | 1 | 3 | 1 | 5 |
| 5 | Kazakhstan | 1 | 2 | 1 | 4 |
| 6 | Hong Kong | 1 | 1 | 3 | 5 |
| 6 | Uzbekistan | 1 | 1 | 3 | 5 |
| 8 | Malaysia | 1 | 1 | 2 | 4 |
| 9 | Thailand | 1 | 0 | 0 | 1 |
| 10 | Mongolia | 0 | 1 | 0 | 1 |
| 10 | United Arab Emirates | 0 | 1 | 0 | 1 |
| 12 | Indonesia | 0 | 0 | 1 | 1 |
| Totals (12 entries) | | 20 | 20 | 20 | 60 |
