= 2017 Asian Track Cycling Championships =

- Venue: New Delhi, India
- Date: 6–10 February 2017
- Velodrome: Indira Gandhi Stadium Velodrome

The 2017 Asian Track Cycling Championships took place at the Indira Gandhi Stadium Velodrome in New Delhi, India from 6 to 10 February 2017.

== Medal summary ==
=== Men ===
Event	Gold	Silver	Bronze
Sprint	Azizulhasni Awang; Malaysia	Tomoyuki Kawabata; Japan	Yuta Wakimoto; Japan
1 km time trial	Mohammad Daneshvar; Iran	Hsiao Shih-hsin; Chinese Taipei	Na Jung-gyu; South Korea
Keirin	Yuta Wakimoto; Japan	Kazunari Watanabe; Japan	Shah Firdaus Sahrom; Malaysia
Individual pursuit	Park Sang-hoon; South Korea	Artyom Zakharov; Kazakhstan	Li Wen-chao; Chinese Taipei
Points race	Takuto Kurabayashi; Japan	Chen Chien-chou; Chinese Taipei	Yousif Mirza; United Arab Emirates
Scratch	Leung Chun Wing; Hong Kong	Mohammad Rajabloo; Iran	Robert Gaineyev; Kazakhstan
Omnium	Sultanmurat Miraliyev; Kazakhstan	Leung Chun Wing; Hong Kong	Kim Ok-cheol; South Korea
Madison	South Korea; Park Sang-hoon; Im Jae-yeon	Kazakhstan; Sultanmurat Miraliyev; Artyom Zakharov	Japan; Taisei Kobayashi; Minori Shimmura
Team sprint	China; Gao Jianwei; Li Jianxin; Luo Yongjia	Iran; Hassan Ali Varposhti; Ali Aliasgari; Mohammad Daneshvar	Japan; Kazunari Watanabe; Kazuki Amagai; Tomoyuki Kawabata
Team pursuit	China; Yuan Zhong; Fan Yang; Qin Chenlu; Xue Saifei	South Korea; Min Kyeong-ho; Park Sang-hoon; Kim Ok-cheol; Im Jae-yeon	Japan; Takuto Kurabayashi; Ryo Chikatani; Minori Shimmura; Hiroaki Harada

=== Women ===
Event	Gold	Silver	Bronze
Sprint	Lee Wai Sze; Hong Kong	Kim Won-gyeong; South Korea	Lee Hye-jin; South Korea
500 m time trial	Lee Wai Sze; Hong Kong	Cho Sun-young; South Korea	Li Xuemei; China
Keirin	Lee Wai Sze; Hong Kong	Lee Hye-jin; South Korea	Kayono Maeda; Japan
Individual pursuit	Lee Ju-mi; South Korea	Yumi Kajihara; Japan	Huang Dongyan; China
Points race	Yumi Kajihara; Japan	Huang Li; China	Kim You-ri; South Korea
Scratch	Huang Li; China	Kang Hyun-kyung; South Korea	Diao Xiaojuan; Hong Kong
Omnium	Yumi Kajihara; Japan	Luo Xiaoling; China	Meng Zhaojuan; Hong Kong
Madison	Hong Kong; Pang Yao; Meng Zhaojuan	South Korea; Son Eun-ju; Kang Hyun-kyung	Japan; Kie Furuyama; Yumi Kajihara
Team sprint	South Korea; Kim Won-gyeong; Lee Hye-jin	Hong Kong; Lee Wai Sze; Ma Wing Yu	Japan; Kayono Maeda; Riyu Ota
Team pursuit	China; Huang Dongyan; Chen Qiaolin; Chen Siyu; Luo Xiaoling; Huang Li	Hong Kong; Yang Qianyu; Pang Yao; Leung Bo Yee; Diao Xiaojuan	South Korea; Lee Ju-mi; Son Eun-ju; Kang Hyun-kyung; Kim You-ri

== Medal table ==
Rank	Nation	Gold	Silver	Bronze	Total
1	Hong Kong	5	3	2	10
2	South Korea	4	6	5	15
3	Japan	4	3	7	14
4	China	4	2	2	8
5	Kazakhstan	1	2	1	4
6	Iran	1	2	0	3
7	Malaysia	1	0	1	2
8	Chinese Taipei	0	2	1	3
9	United Arab Emirates	0	0	1	1
Totals (9 entries)		20	20	20	60
