= Jing Yali =

Chinese track cyclist

Personal information
- Full name: Jing Yali
- Born: 25 May 1989 (age 37) China

Cycling career
- Sport: Cycling
- Discipline: Track cycling

Jing Yali (Chinese: 荆雅礼; pinyin: Jīng Yālǐ; born 25 May 1989) is a track cyclist from China. She represented her nation at the 2014 and 2015 UCI Track Cycling World Championships, and at the 2015 Asian Cycling Championships, where she won a gold medal in team pursuit.

Jing competed for the Chinese track cycling team in the women's team pursuit at the 2016 Summer Olympics in Rio de Janeiro. There, she delivered the foursome of Huang Dongyan, Ma Menglu, and Zhao Baofang a seventh-place time and an Asian track cycling record of 4:23.678 in the semifinals, losing the opening heat to the Italian squad by almost a full second.

== Major results ==
2014
Asian Track Championships

1st Individual Pursuit
1st Team Pursuit (with Huang Dongyan, Jiang Wenwen and Zhao Baofang)

1st Team Pursuit, Asian Games (with Huang Dongyan, Jiang Wenwen and Zhao Baofang)
2015
1st Team Pursuit, Asian Track Championships (with Huang Dongyan, Jiang Wenwen and Zhao Baofang)
3rd Omnium, China Track Cup
2017
1st Team Pursuit, National Track Championships (with Huang Dongyan, Ma Menglu and Wang Hong)
