= Huang Dongyan =

Chinese cyclist (born 1993)

Personal information
- Born: 14 December 1993 (age 32) Shanghai, China

Cycling career
- Sport: Cycling
- Role: Rider

Huang Dongyan (Chinese: 黄冬艳; pinyin: Huang Dongyan, born 14 December 1993) is a Chinese professional racing cyclist. She rides for China Chongming-Liv-Champion System Pro Cycling. She is from Shanghai. She also competed at the 2014 Asian Games.

== Major results ==
2014
Asian Track Championships

1st Scratch Race
1st Team Pursuit (with Jiang Wenwen, Jing Yali and Zhao Baofang)

1st Team Pursuit, Asian Games (with Jiang Wenwen, Jing Yali and Zhao Baofang)
3rd Omnium, China Track Cup
2015
1st Team Pursuit, Asian Track Championships (with Jiang Wenwen, Jing Yali and Zhao Baofang)
2nd Omnium, China Track Cup
3rd Omnium, South Australian Grand Prix
2016
1st Team Pursuit, Asian Track Championships (with Chen Lulu, Ma Menglu and Wang Hong)
2017
Asian Track Championships

1st Team Pursuit (with Chen Qiaolin, Chen Siyu and Luo Xiaoling
3rd Individual Pursuit

1st Team Pursuit, National Track Championships (with Jing Yali, Ma Menglu and Wang Hong)

== See also ==
- List of 2015 UCI Women's Teams and riders
