= Cycling at the 2018 Asian Games – Men's downhill =

Men's downhill at the 2018 Asian Games
- Venue: Khe Bun Hill
- Date: 20 August 2018
- Competitors: 9 from 7 nations

Medalists
gold medal	Khoiful Mukhib	Indonesia
silver medal	Chiang Sheng-shan	Chinese Taipei
bronze medal	Suebsakun Sukchanya	Thailand

The men's downhill competition at the 2018 Asian Games was held on 20 August 2018 at the Khe Bun Hill Subang.

== Schedule ==
All times are Western Indonesia Time (UTC+07:00)

Date	Time	Event
Monday, 20 August 2018	11:00	Seeding run
Monday, 20 August 2018	13:30	Final

== Results ==
Legend

- DNF — Did not finish

=== Seeding run ===
Rank	Athlete	Time
1	Popo Ariyo Sejati (INA)	2:14.951
2	Khoiful Mukhib (INA)	2:19.474
3	Suebsakun Sukchanya (THA)	2:21.498
4	Chiang Sheng-shan (TPE)	2:22.442
5	Chinnapat Sukchanya (THA)	2:23.640
6	Jerich Farr (PHI)	2:26.019
7	Hossein Zanjanian (IRI)	2:30.962
8	Rajesh Magar (NEP)	3:12.816
9	Matias Li (TLS)	15:38.661

=== Final ===
Rank	Athlete	Time
1st place, gold medalist(s)	Khoiful Mukhib (INA)	2:16.687
2nd place, silver medalist(s)	Chiang Sheng-shan (TPE)	2:18.184
3rd place, bronze medalist(s)	Suebsakun Sukchanya (THA)	2:18.449
4	Chinnapat Sukchanya (THA)	2:20.404
5	Hossein Zanjanian (IRI)	2:21.623
6	Jerich Farr (PHI)	2:24.547
7	Rajesh Magar (NEP)	2:28.538
8	Matias Li (TLS)	2:57.172
—	Popo Ariyo Sejati (INA)	DNF
