= Kazuki Amagai =

Japanese cyclist (born 1990)

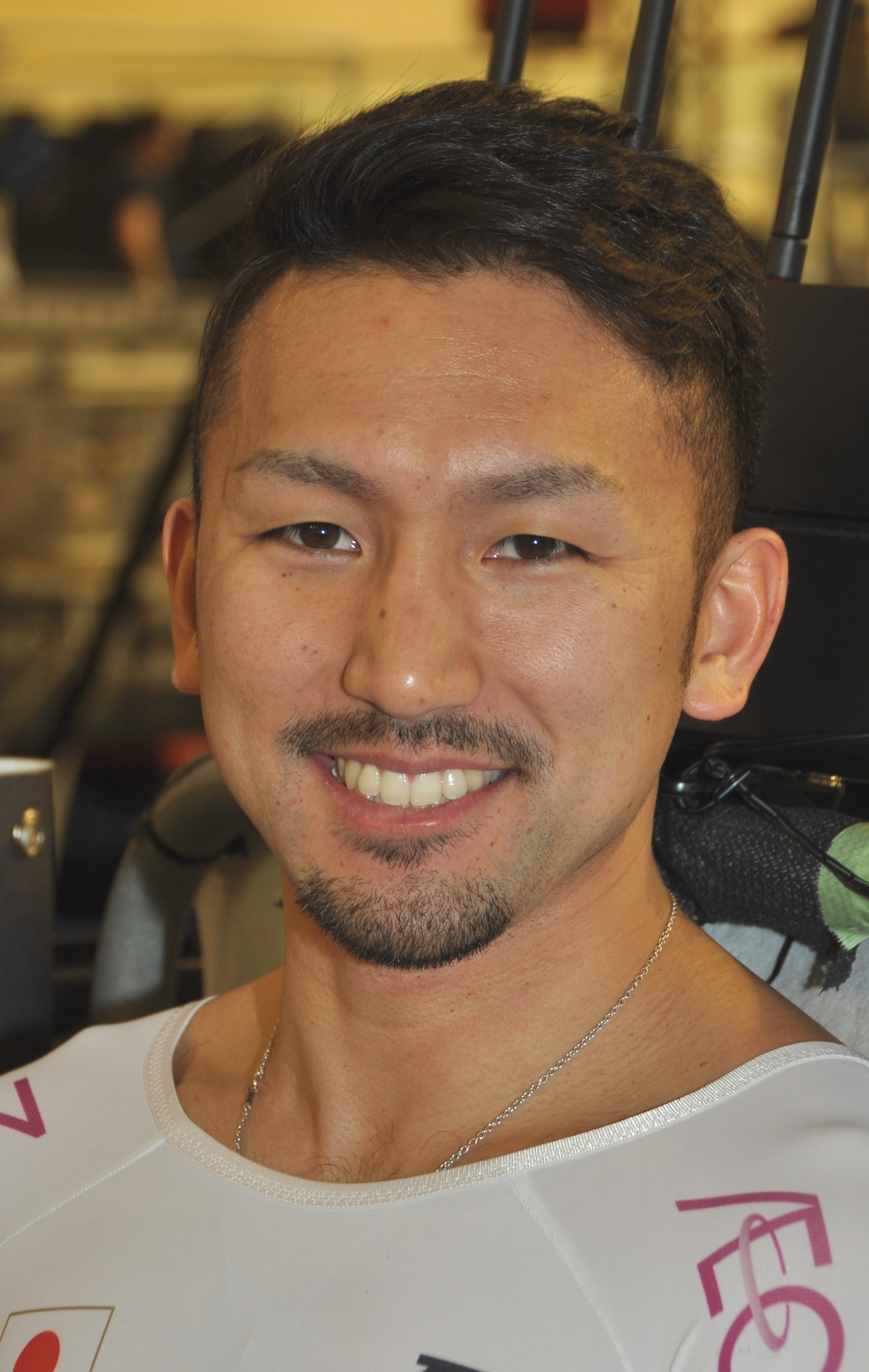
- Amagai in 2018

Personal information
- Born: 14 January 1990 (age 36)

Cycling career
- Sport: Cycling
- Role: Rider
Medal record
Representing Japan
Men's track cycling
Asian Games
Bronze medal – third place	2018 Jakarta-Palembang	Team sprint
Asian Championships
Gold medal – first place	2019 Jakarta	Team sprint
Gold medal – first place	2020 Jincheon	Team sprint
Silver medal – second place	2011 Nakhon Ratchasima	Team sprint
Silver medal – second place	2015 Nakhon Ratchasima	Team sprint
Bronze medal – third place	2016 Izu	Team sprint
Bronze medal – third place	2017 New Delhi	Team sprint

Kazuki Amagai (雨谷 一樹, Amagai Kazuki; born 14 January 1990) is a Japanese professional racing cyclist. He rode at the 2015 UCI Track Cycling World Championships. In Japan he is mostly known as a professional keirin cyclist.
