= Nao Suzuki =

Japanese cyclist

Personal information
- Born: 9 February 1997 (age 29)

Cycling career
- Sport: Cycling
- Role: Rider
Medal record
Women's track cycling
Representing Japan
Asian Championships
Bronze medal – third place	2020 Jincheon	Team pursuit

Nao Suzuki (鈴木 奈央, Suzuki Nao; born 9 February 1997) is a Japanese racing cyclist. She rode in the women's scratch event at the 2018 UCI Track Cycling World Championships.
