= Francesca Pattaro =

Italian cyclist (born 1995)

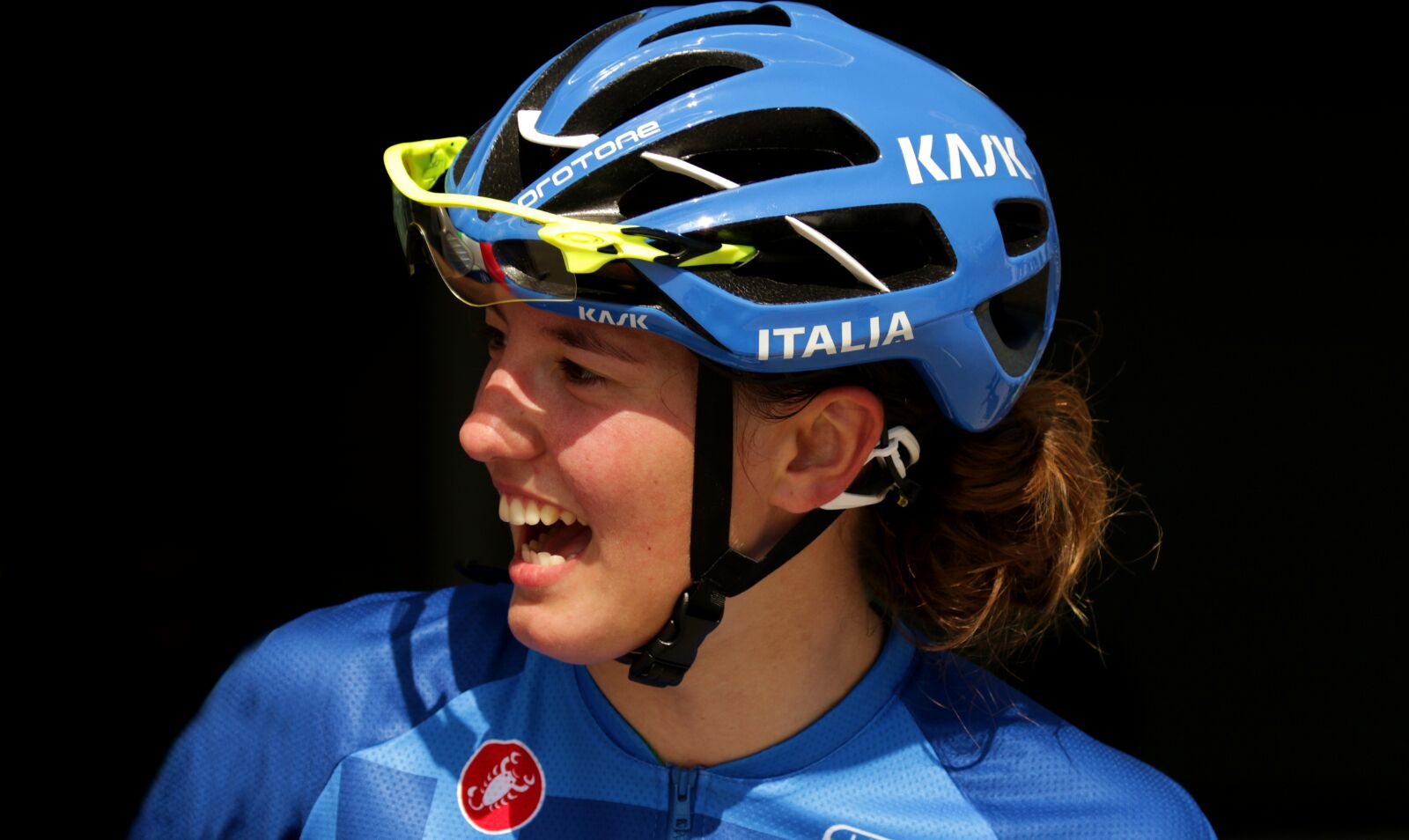

Personal information
- Full name: Francesca Pattaro
- Born: 12 March 1995 (age 31) Este, Veneto, Italy

Cycling career
- Sport: Cycling
- Disciplines: Road; Track
- Role: Rider

Professional teams
- 2016–2019: Bepink
- 2020: Astana
Medal record
Women's track cycling
Representing Italy
European Championships
Gold medal – first place	2016 Yvelines	Team pursuit

Francesca Pattaro (born 12 March 1995) is an Italian road and track cyclist, who most recently rode for UCI Women's Continental Team Astana. She rode in the women's team pursuit event at the 2016 Summer Olympics.

== Major results ==
2014
3rd Team Pursuit, UEC European Under-23 Track Championships (with Beatrice Bartelloni, Elena Cecchini and Maria Giulia Confalonieri)
2016
2nd Team Pursuit, UEC European Under-23 Track Championships (with Martina Alzini, Claudia Cretti and Michela Maltese)
2017
1st Team Pursuit, Round 1, (Pruszków) Track Cycling World Cup (with Tatiana Guderzo, Elisa Balsamo and Silvia Valsecchi)
