= Zhao Baofang =

Chinese track cyclist

Personal information
- Born: 12 August 1993 (age 33) Henan, China

Cycling career
- Sport: Cycling
- Discipline: Track cycling
- Role: Rider
- Rider type: team pursuit

Zhao Baofang (born 12 August 1993) is a Chinese female track cyclist. She competed in the team pursuit event at the 2014 and 2015 UCI Track Cycling World Championships.

== Major results ==
2014
1st Team Pursuit, Asian Track Championships (with Huang Dongyan, Jiang Wenwen and Jing Yali)
1st Team Pursuit, Asian Games (with Huang Dongyan, Jiang Wenwen and Jing Yali)
2015
1st Team Pursuit, Asian Track Championships (with Huang Dongyan, Jiang Wenwen and Jing Yali)
