= Im Jae-yeon =

South Korean cyclist (born 1991)

Personal information
- Full name: Im Jae-yeon; Korean: 임재연
- Born: 6 September 1991 (age 35)

Cycling career
- Sport: Cycling
- Current team: Korail Cycling Team
- Disciplines: Road; Track
- Role: Rider

Professional teams
- 2014: CCN
- 2015: Team 7 Eleven Road Bike Philippines
- 2017–: Korail Cycling Team
Medal record
Representing South Korea
Men's track cycling
Asian Games
Silver medal – second place	2014 Incheon	Team pursuit
Asian Championships
Gold medal – first place	2014 Astana	Individual pursuit
Gold medal – first place	2017 New Delhi	Madison
Gold medal – first place	2019 Jakarta	Madison
Gold medal – first place	2019 Jakarta	Team pursuit
Silver medal – second place	2015 Nakhon Ratchasima	Omnium
Silver medal – second place	2017 New Delhi	Team pursuit
Silver medal – second place	2018 Nilai	Team pursuit
Silver medal – second place	2020 Jincheon	Team pursuit
Bronze medal – third place	2015 Nakhon Ratchasima	Team pursuit
Bronze medal – third place	2016 Izu	Team pursuit
Bronze medal – third place	2018 Nilai	Madison

Im Jae-yeon (Korean: 임재연; born 6 September 1991) is a South Korean road and track cyclist, who currently rides for UCI Continental team Korail Cycling Team. He won the bronze medal in the team pursuit at the 2016 Asian Cycling Championships.
