= Kim You-ri =

South Korean cyclist (born 1987)

Personal information
- Full name: Kim You-ri; 김유리
- Born: 21 November 1987 (age 38)

Cycling career
- Sport: Cycling
- Discipline: Track cycling
- Role: Rider
Medal record
Women's track cycling
Representing South Korea
Asian Games
Gold medal – first place	2018 Jakarta-Palembang	Madison
Gold medal – first place	2018 Jakarta-Palembang	Team pursuit
Silver medal – second place	2014 Incheon	Team pursuit
Bronze medal – third place	2018 Jakarta-Palembang	Omnium
Asian Championships
Gold medal – first place	2013 New Delhi	Individual pursuit
Gold medal – first place	2013 New Delhi	Team pursuit
Gold medal – first place	2019 Jakarta	Team pursuit
Gold medal – first place	2022 New Delhi	Scratch
Gold medal – first place	2022 New Delhi	Team pursuit
Silver medal – second place	2011 Nakhon Ratchasima	Team pursuit
Silver medal – second place	2014 Astana	Team pursuit
Silver medal – second place	2018 Nilai	Madison
Silver medal – second place	2019 Jakarta	Madison
Silver medal – second place	2022 New Delhi	Madison
Bronze medal – third place	2016 Izu	Team pursuit
Bronze medal – third place	2017 New Delhi	Points race
Bronze medal – third place	2017 New Delhi	Team pursuit
Bronze medal – third place	2018 Nilai	Team pursuit

Kim You-ri (Korean: 김유리; born 21 November 1987) is a South Korean female track cyclist. She won the bronze medal in the team pursuit at the 2016 Asian Cycling Championships.

== Career results ==
2016
3rd Team Pursuit, Asian Track Championships (with Lee Ju-hee, Kang Hyeong-Yeong and Son Eun-ju)
2017
Asian Track Championships

3rd Points Race
3rd Team Pursuit (with Lee Ju-mi, Kang Hyeong-Yeong and Son Eun-ju)
