= Chen Qiaolin =

Chinese cyclist

Personal information
- Full name: Chen Qiaolin; Chinese: 陈巧林; pinyin: Chén Qiǎolín
- Born: 2 September 1996 (age 30)
- Height: 167 cm (5 ft 6 in)
- Weight: 60 kg (132 lb)

Cycling career
- Sport: Cycling
- Disciplines: Road; Track
- Role: Rider

Professional teams
- 2016: China Chongming–Liv–Champion System
- 2018–2020: China Chongming–Liv
Medal record
Representing China
Women's track cycling
Asian Games
Silver medal – second place	2018 Jakarta	Team pursuit
Asian Championships
Gold medal – first place	2017 New Delhi	Team pursuit
Bronze medal – third place	2019 Jakarta	Team pursuit

Chen Qiaolin (Chinese: 陈巧林; pinyin: Chén Qiǎolín; born September 2, 1996) is a Chinese road and track cyclist, who most recently rode for UCI Women's Continental Team China Liv Pro Cycling. Competing in the team pursuit she won a gold medal at the 2017 Asian Championships and a silver at the 2018 Asian Games.
