= 2022 Asian Track Cycling Championships =

Cycling championships

- Venue: New Delhi, India
- Date: 18–22 June 2022
- Velodrome: Indira Gandhi Stadium Velodrome

The 2022 Asian Track Cycling Championships (41st edition) took place at the Indira Gandhi Stadium Velodrome in New Delhi, India from 18 to 22 June 2022.

== Medal summary ==
=== Men ===
Event	Gold	Silver	Bronze
Sprint	Kento Yamasaki; Japan	Ronaldo Laitonjam; India	Andrey Chugay; Kazakhstan
1 km time trial	Yuta Obara; Japan	Fadhil Zonis; Malaysia	Ronaldo Laitonjam; India
Keirin	Kohei Terasaki; Japan	Shah Firdaus Sahrom; Malaysia	Sergey Ponomaryov; Kazakhstan
Individual pursuit	Shoi Matsuda; Japan	Park Sang-hoon; South Korea	Vishavjeet Singh; India
Points race	Yousif Mirza; United Arab Emirates	Kim Eu-ro; South Korea	Naoki Kojima; Japan
Scratch	Eiya Hashimoto; Japan	Terry Yudha Kusuma; Indonesia	Mohammad Ganjkhanloo; Iran
Omnium	Shunsuke Imamura; Japan	Artyom Zakharov; Kazakhstan	Mohammad Ganjkhanloo; Iran
Madison	Japan; Shunsuke Imamura; Kazushige Kuboki	South Korea; Park Sang-hoon; Min Kyeong-ho	Kazakhstan; Artyom Zakharov; Alisher Zhumakan
Team sprint	Japan; Yuta Obara; Kaiya Ota; Yoshitaku Nagasako; Kohei Terasaki	Malaysia; Fadhil Zonis; Shah Firdaus Sahrom; Ridwan Sahrom	India; David Beckham; Ronaldo Laitonjam; Rojit Singh Yanglem; Esow Alben
Team pursuit	Japan; Shoi Matsuda; Kazushige Kuboki; Shunsuke Imamura; Naoki Kojima; Eiya Hashimoto	South Korea; Park Sang-hoon; Min Kyeong-ho; Shin Dong-in; Jang Hun	India; Vishavjeet Singh; Dinesh Kumar; Venkappa Kengalgutti; Anantha Narayan; Naman Kapil

=== Women ===
Event	Gold	Silver	Bronze
Sprint	Riyu Ota; Japan	Yuka Kobayashi; Japan	Cho Sun-young; South Korea
500 m time trial	Nurul Izzah Izzati Asri; Malaysia	Kim Bo-mi; South Korea	Mayuri Lute; India
Keirin	Mina Sato; Japan	Park Ji-hae; South Korea	Nurul Izzah Izzati Asri; Malaysia
Individual pursuit	Lee Ju-mi; South Korea	Kie Furuyama; Japan	Yanina Kuskova; Uzbekistan
Points race	Tsuyaka Uchino; Japan	Kang Hyun-kyung; South Korea	Yanina Kuskova; Uzbekistan
Scratch	Kim You-ri; South Korea	Kie Furuyama; Japan	Chayanika Gogoi; India
Omnium	Tsuyaka Uchino; Japan	Ayustina Delia Priatna; Indonesia	Rinata Sultanova; Kazakhstan
Madison	Japan; Kie Furuyama; Tsuyaka Uchino	South Korea; Kim You-ri; Na Ah-reum	Uzbekistan; Nafosat Kozieva; Yanina Kuskova
Team sprint	South Korea; Cho Sun-young; Park Ji-hae; Hwang Hyeon-seo	Japan; Riyu Ota; Yuka Kobayashi; Mina Sato	India; Triyasha Paul; Shushikala Agashe; Mayuri Lute
Team pursuit	South Korea; Lee Ju-mi; Shin Ji-eun; Kim You-ri; Na Ah-reum; Kang Hyun-kyung	Kazakhstan; Marina Kuzmina; Svetlana Pachshenko; Rinata Sultanova; Anzhela Solovyeva; Faina Potapova	India; Swasti Singh; Chayanika Gogoi; Meenakshi Rohilla; Monika Jat; Rejiye Devi

== Medal table ==
Rank	Nation	Gold	Silver	Bronze	Total
1	Japan	14	4	1	19
2	South Korea	4	8	1	13
3	Malaysia	1	3	1	5
4	United Arab Emirates	1	0	0	1
5	Kazakhstan	0	2	4	6
6	Indonesia	0	2	0	2
7	India	0	1	8	9
8	Uzbekistan	0	0	3	3
9	Iran	0	0	2	2
Totals (9 entries)		20	20	20	60
