= Ma Menglu =

Chinese track cyclist

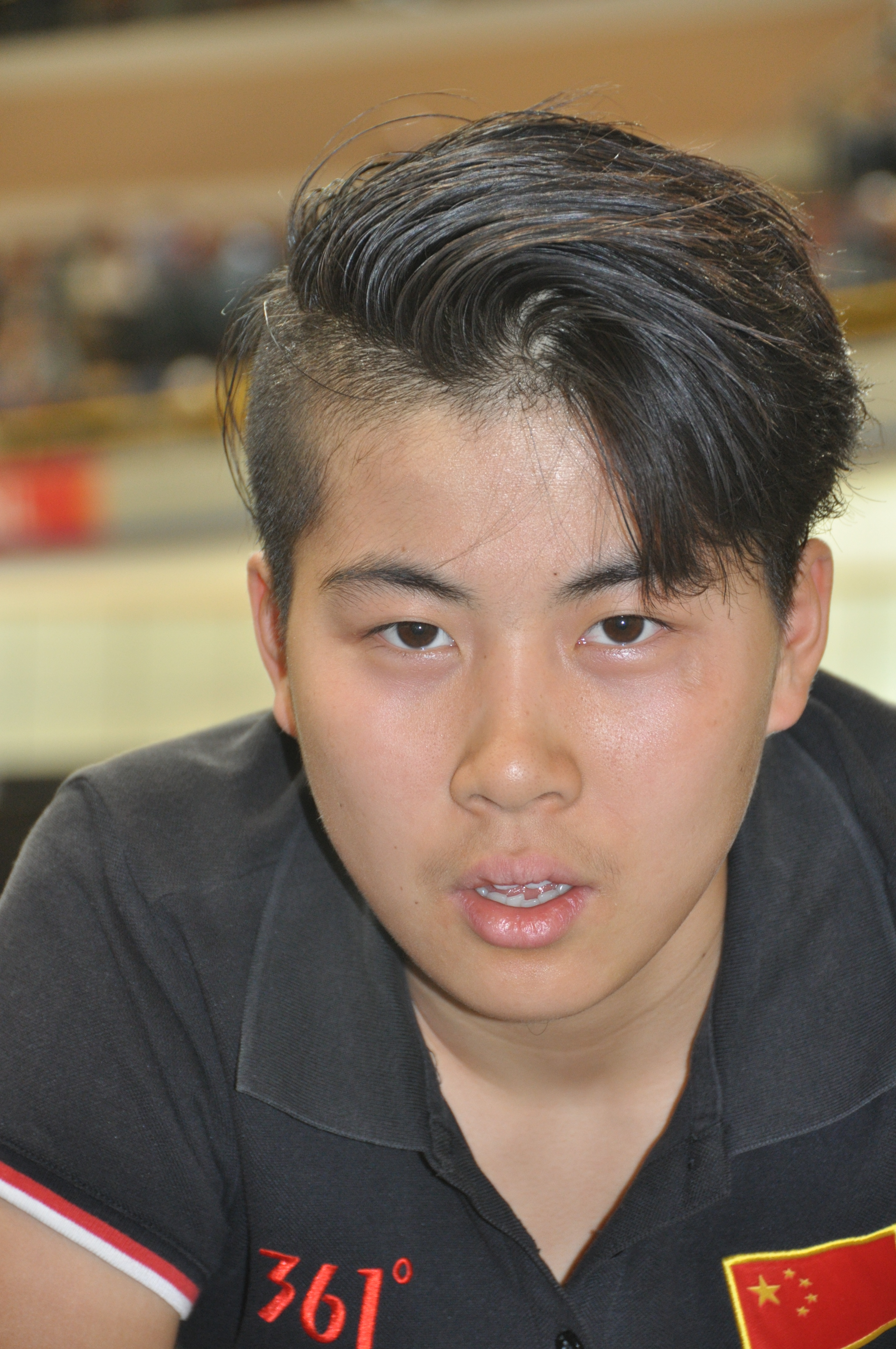
- Ma Menglu (2016)

Personal information
- Born: 24 September 1997 (age 29)

Cycling career
- Sport: Cycling
- Discipline: Track cycling
- Role: Rider
Medal record
Women's track cycling
Representing China
Asian Championships
| Gold medal – first place | 2016 Izu | team pursuit |

Ma Menglu (simplified Chinese: 马梦露; traditional Chinese: 馬夢露; pinyin: Mǎ Mènglù; born 24 September 1997) is a Chinese female track cyclist. She won the gold medal in the team pursuit at the 2016 Asian Cycling Championships.

== Major results ==
2016
1st Team Pursuit, Asian Track Championships (with Chen Lulu, Huang Dongyan and Wang Hong)
2017
1st Team Pursuit, National Track Championships (with Huang Dongyan, Jing Yali and Wang Hong)
