= Cycling at the 2018 Asian Games – Men's team pursuit =

Men's team pursuit at the 2018 Asian Games
- Venue: Jakarta International Velodrome
- Date: 27–28 August 2018
- Competitors: 44 from 10 nations

Medalists
gold medal	China; Guo Liang, Qin Chenlu, Xue Chaohua, Shen Pingan
silver medal	Hong Kong; Leung Chun Wing, Leung Ka Yu, Mow Ching Yin, Cheung King Lok, Ko Siu Wai
bronze medal	Japan; Shogo Ichimaru, Shunsuke Imamura, Ryo Chikatani, Eiya Hashimoto, Keitaro Sawada

The men's team pursuit competition at the 2018 Asian Games was held on 27 and 28 August at the Jakarta International Velodrome.

== Schedule ==
All times are Western Indonesia Time (UTC+07:00)

Date	Time	Event
Monday, 27 August 2018	14:10	Qualifying
Tuesday, 28 August 2018	09:41	First round
Tuesday, 28 August 2018	16:27	Finals

== Records ==
Prior to this competition, the existing world, Asian and Games records were as follows.

World Record	Australia	3:49.804	Gold Coast, Australia	5 April 2018
Asian Record	Japan	3:57.801	Nilai, Malaysia	17 February 2018
Games Record	South Korea	4:06.598	Guangzhou, China	15 November 2010

== Results ==
Legend

- DNF — Did not finish

=== Qualifying ===
Rank	Team	Time	Notes
1	South Korea (KOR); Im Jae-yeon; Shin Dong-in; Kim Ok-cheol; Min Kyeong-ho	3:56.247	AR
2	Hong Kong (HKG); Ko Siu Wai; Leung Chun Wing; Leung Ka Yu; Mow Ching Yin	4:09.820	
3	Kazakhstan (KAZ); Nikita Panassenko; Assylkhan Turar; Alisher Zhumakan; Sultanmurat Miraliyev	4:10.384	
4	China (CHN); Guo Liang; Qin Chenlu; Xue Chaohua; Shen Pingan	4:10.729	
5	Japan (JPN); Shogo Ichimaru; Keitaro Sawada; Shunsuke Imamura; Ryo Chikatani	4:12.173	
6	Malaysia (MAS); Afiq Huznie Othman; Irwandie Lakasek; Nur Aiman Zariff; Danieal Haikkal	4:14.039	
7	Thailand (THA); Sarawut Sirironnachai; Yuttana Mano; Navuti Liphongyu; Patompob Phonarjthan	4:16.821	
8	United Arab Emirates (UAE); Yousif Mirza; Ahmed Al-Mansoori; Mohammed Al-Mansoori; Mohammed Al-Murawwi	4:20.084	
9	Indonesia (INA); Elan Riyadi; Bernard Van Aert; Nandra Eko Wahyudi; Robin Manullang	4:22.845	
10	India (IND); Manjeet Singh; Raju Bati; Bike Singh Athokpam; Dilawar Singh	4:23.251	

=== First round ===
==== Heat 1 ====
Rank	Team	Time	Notes
1	Thailand (THA); Sarawut Sirironnachai; Yuttana Mano; Navuti Liphongyu; Patompob Phonarjthan	4:14.789	
2	Malaysia (MAS); Afiq Huznie Othman; Irwandie Lakasek; Nur Aiman Zariff; Nur Aiman Rosli	4:15.768	

==== Heat 2 ====
Rank	Team	Time	Notes
1	Japan (JPN); Shogo Ichimaru; Shunsuke Imamura; Ryo Chikatani; Eiya Hashimoto	4:04.222	
2	United Arab Emirates (UAE); Yousif Mirza; Ahmed Al-Mansoori; Mohammed Al-Mansoori; Mohammed Al-Murawwi	4:15.687	

==== Heat 3 ====
Rank	Team	Time	Notes
1	Hong Kong (HKG); Ko Siu Wai; Leung Chun Wing; Leung Ka Yu; Mow Ching Yin	4:06.085	
2	Kazakhstan (KAZ); Nikita Panassenko; Alisher Zhumakan; Sultanmurat Miraliyev; Robert Gaineyev	4:10.991	

==== Heat 4 ====
Rank	Team	Time	Notes
1	China (CHN); Guo Liang; Qin Chenlu; Xue Chaohua; Shen Pingan	4:07.118	
—	South Korea (KOR); Im Jae-yeon; Shin Dong-in; Kim Ok-cheol; Min Kyeong-ho	DNF	

==== Summary ====
Rank	Team	Time
3	Japan (JPN)	4:04.222
4	Kazakhstan (KAZ)	4:10.991
5	Thailand (THA)	4:14.789
6	United Arab Emirates (UAE)	4:15.687
7	Malaysia (MAS)	4:15.768
8	South Korea (KOR)	DNF

=== Finals ===
==== Bronze ====
Rank	Team	Time	Notes
3rd place, bronze medalist(s)	Japan (JPN); Shogo Ichimaru; Shunsuke Imamura; Ryo Chikatani; Eiya Hashimoto		
4	Kazakhstan (KAZ); Nikita Panassenko; Alisher Zhumakan; Sultanmurat Miraliyev; Assylkhan Turar	Overlapped	

==== Gold ====
Rank	Team	Time	Notes
1st place, gold medalist(s)	China (CHN); Guo Liang; Qin Chenlu; Xue Chaohua; Shen Pingan	4:03.790	
2nd place, silver medalist(s)	Hong Kong (HKG); Leung Chun Wing; Leung Ka Yu; Mow Ching Yin; Cheung King Lok	4:10.368	
