= List of Taiwanese records in track cycling =

The following are the national records in track cycling in Chinese Taipei maintained by Chinese Taipei Cycling Association.

== Men ==
Event	Record	Athlete	Date	Meet	Place	Ref
Flying 200 m time trial	9.764	Hsieh Nien-hsing	29 February 2020	World Championships	Berlin, Germany	
Flying 200 m time trial	9.715	Hsieh Nien-hsing	15 June 2023	Asian Championships	Nilai, Malaysia	
Flying 200 m time trial	9.708	Kang Shih-feng	29 March 2026	Asian Championships	Tagaytay, Philippines	
250m time trial (standing start)	18.033	Yang Sheng-kai	26 September 2023	Asian Games	Chun'an, China	
500 m time trial	32.421	Hsiao Shih-hsin	18 February 2018	Asian Championships	Nilai, Malaysia	
1 km time trial	1:01.821	Hsiao Shih-hsin	18 February 2018	Asian Championships	Nilai, Malaysia	
Team sprint	44.276	Yang Sheng-kai; Kang Shih-feng; Hsiao Shih-hsin	26 September 2023	Asian Games	Chun'an, China	
4000m individual pursuit	4:27.983	Sergio Tu	7 September 2023	National Games	Taichung, Taiwan	
4000m individual pursuit	4:12.092	Tu Chih-hao	30 March 2026	Asian Championships	Tagaytay, Philippines	
4000m team pursuit	4:03.364	Li Jing-feng; Chang Chih-sheng; Chien Yun-tse; Zhang En-teng	22 February 2025	Asian Championships	Nilai, Malaysia	
4000m team pursuit	3:58.800	Li Jing-feng; Xu Shi-ru; Tu Chih-hao; Chien Yun-tse	25 March 2026	Asian Championships	Tagaytay, Philippines	

== Women ==
Event	Record	Athlete	Date	Meet	Place	Ref
Flying 200 m time trial	11.256	Chang Yao	18 February 2018 (Note: by official result source; 19 February 2018 by CTCA source, probably a typo)	Asian Championships	Nilai, Malaysia	
Flying 200 m time trial	11.088	Chen Ching-yun	29 March 2026	Asian Championships	Tagaytay, Philippines	
Flying 200 m time trial	10.983	Liu Shang-ying	1 October 2026	Asian Games	Izu, Japan	
250m time trial (standing start)	20.012	Hsiao Mei-yu	26 September 2023	Asian Games	Chun'an, China	
500 m time trial	34.857	Hsiao Mei-yu	19 October 2013	National Games	Hsinchu, Taiwan	
1 km time trial	1:11.128	Wang Sin-ting	26 February 2025	Asian Championships	Nilai, Malaysia	
1 km time trial	1:08.983	Liu Shang-ying	31 March 2026	Asian Championships	Tagaytay, Philippines	
Team sprint (500 m)						
Team sprint (750 m)	49.061	Wang Sin-ting; Chen Ching-yun; Liu Shang-ying	29 September 2026	Asian Games	Izu, Japan	
3000m individual pursuit	3:35.546	Huang Ting-ying	18 February 2018	Asian Championships	Nilai, Malaysia	
4000m individual pursuit	5:12.935	Lai Chia-chi	27 February 2025	Asian Championships	Nilai, Malaysia	
4000m individual pursuit	5:04.242	Zeng Ke-xin	28 March 2026	Asian Championships	Tagaytay, Philippines	
4000m team pursuit	4:37.148	Hsiao Mei-yu; Huang Ting-ying; Tseng Hsiao-chia; I Fang-ju	22 September 2014	Asian Games	Incheon, South Korea	
