= List of South Korean records in track cycling =

The following are the national records in track cycling in South Korea maintained by the Korea Cycling Federation.

== Men ==
Event	Record	Athlete	Date	Meet	Place	Ref
Flying 200m time trial	9.555	Kim Geun-woo	22 June 2025	South Korean Championships	Yangyang, South Korea	
250m time trial (standing start)	17.405	Im Chae-bin	9 December 2017	World Cup	Santiago, Chile	
500 m time trial	31.900	Im Chae-bin	20 February 2015	World Championships	Saint-Quentin-en-Yvelines, France	
1 km time trial	1:00.465	Choi Tae-ho	24 October 2025	World Championships	Santiago, Chile	
Team sprint	43.578	Im Chae-bin; Park Je-one; Son Je-yong	9 December 2017	World Cup	Santiago, Chile	
4000m individual pursuit	4:12.902	Min Kyeong-ho	30 March 2026	Asian Championships	Tagaytay, Philippines	
4000m team pursuit	3:53.923	Jang Hun; Kim Hyeon-seok; Min Kyeong-ho; Hong Seung-min	25 March 2026	Asian Championships	Tagaytay, Philippines	

== Women ==
Event	Record	Athlete	Date	Meet	Place	Ref
Flying 200m time trial	10.403	Lee Hye-jin	26 June 2022	South Korean Championships	Yangyang, South Korea	
250 m time trial (standing start)	18.448	Hwang Hyeon-seo	14 June 2023	Asian Championships	Nilai, Malaysia	
500m time trial	33.637	Lee Hye-jin	2 November 2017		Jincheon, South Korea	
1 km time trial	1:07.269	Hwang Hyeon-seo	31 March 2026	Asian Championships	Tagaytay, Philippines	
Team sprint (500 m)	33.251	Kim Won-gyeong; Lee Hye-jin	10 December 2017	World Cup	Santiago, Chile	
Team sprint (750 m)	48.124	Kim Soo-hyun; Cho Sun-young; Kim Ha-eun	25 March 2026	Asian Championships	Tagaytay, Philippines	
3000m individual pursuit	3:33.048	Lee Ju-mi	30 August 2018	Asian Games	Jakarta, Indonesia	
4000 m individual pursuit	4:51.900	Shin Ji-eun	28 March 2026	Asian Championships	Tagaytay, Philippines	
4000m team pursuit	4:23.652	Kim You-ri; Na Ah-reum; Kim Hyun-ji; Lee Ju-mi	28 August 2018	Asian Games	Jakarta, Indonesia	
