= Cycling at the 2014 Asian Games – Men's team pursuit =

Men's team pursuit at the 2014 Asian Games
- Venue: Incheon International Velodrome
- Date: 20–21 September 2014
- Competitors: 47 from 11 nations

Medalists
gold medal	China; Shi Tao, Yuan Zhong, Qin Chenlu, Liu Hao, Shen Pingan
silver medal	South Korea; Im Jae-yeon, Park Sang-hoon, Park Seon-ho, Park Keon-woo, Jang Sun-jae
bronze medal	Japan; Shogo Ichimaru, Kazushige Kuboki, Eiya Hashimoto, Ryo Chikatani

The men's 4 kilometres team pursuit competition at the 2014 Asian Games was held on 20 and 21 September at the Incheon International Velodrome.

== Schedule ==
All times are Korea Standard Time (UTC+09:00)

Date	Time	Event
Saturday, 20 September 2014	17:00	Qualifying
Sunday, 21 September 2014	16:12	First round
Sunday, 21 September 2014	18:00	Finals

== Records ==
Prior to this competition, the existing world, Asian and Games records were as follows.

World Record	Great Britain	3:51.659	London, United Kingdom	3 August 2012
Asian Record	Kazakhstan	4:04.809	Aguascalientes, Mexico	5 December 2013
Games Record	South Korea	4:06.598	Guangzhou, China	15 November 2010

== Results ==
=== Qualifying ===
Rank	Team	Time	Notes
1	China (CHN); Yuan Zhong; Shen Pingan; Qin Chenlu; Liu Hao	4:10.458	
2	Hong Kong (HKG); Wu Lok Chun; Cheung King Wai; Cheung King Lok; Leung Chun Wing	4:11.030	
3	South Korea (KOR); Im Jae-yeon; Park Sang-hoon; Jang Sun-jae; Park Keon-woo	4:11.346	
4	Japan (JPN); Shogo Ichimaru; Kazushige Kuboki; Eiya Hashimoto; Ryo Chikatani	4:12.711	
5	Kazakhstan (KAZ); Dias Omirzakov; Nikita Panassenko; Robert Gaineyev; Artyom Zakharov	4:17.249	
6	Uzbekistan (UZB); Ruslan Fedorov; Sergey Medvedev; Vladimir Tuychiev; Timur Gumerov	4:25.082	
7	Iran (IRI); Ali Khademi; Hamid Beikkhormizi; Behnam Arian; Mohammad Rajabloo	4:26.513	
8	United Arab Emirates (UAE); Majid Al-Balooshi; Badr Mirza; Ahmed Al-Mansoori; Yousif Mirza	4:28.516	
9	Qatar (QAT); Ahmed Al-Bardiny; Abdullah Salem Afif; Abdelrahman Jarboua; Khalil Al-Rahman	4:36.864	
10	Saudi Arabia (KSA); Habeeb Al-Shabeeb; Mohammed Al-Mushaykhis; Nasser Al-Ibrahim; Sultan Assiri	4:46.882	
11	Kuwait (KUW); Ali Moslim; Abdulhadi Al-Ajmi; Othman Al-Mutairi; Othman Al-Akari	5:32.667	

=== First round ===
==== Heat 1 ====
Rank	Team	Time	Notes
1	Uzbekistan (UZB); Ruslan Fedorov; Sergey Medvedev; Vladimir Tuychiev; Timur Gumerov	4:20.759	
2	Iran (IRI); Ali Khademi; Hamid Beikkhormizi; Behnam Arian; Mohammad Rajabloo	4:26.282	

==== Heat 2 ====
Rank	Team	Time	Notes
1	Kazakhstan (KAZ); Dias Omirzakov; Nikita Panassenko; Robert Gaineyev; Artyom Zakharov	4:14.246	
2	United Arab Emirates (UAE); Majid Al-Balooshi; Badr Mirza; Ahmed Al-Mansoori; Yousif Mirza	4:26.466	

==== Heat 3 ====
Rank	Team	Time	Notes
1	South Korea (KOR); Im Jae-yeon; Park Sang-hoon; Park Seon-ho; Park Keon-woo	4:11.899	
2	Hong Kong (HKG); Ko Siu Wai; Cheung King Wai; Cheung King Lok; Leung Chun Wing	4:14.541	

==== Heat 4 ====
Rank	Team	Time	Notes
1	China (CHN); Shi Tao; Yuan Zhong; Qin Chenlu; Liu Hao	4:06.626	
2	Japan (JPN); Shogo Ichimaru; Kazushige Kuboki; Eiya Hashimoto; Ryo Chikatani	4:08.470	

==== Summary ====
Rank	Team	Time
3	Japan (JPN)	4:08.470
4	Kazakhstan (KAZ)	4:14.246
5	Hong Kong (HKG)	4:14.541
6	Uzbekistan (UZB)	4:20.759
7	Iran (IRI)	4:26.282
8	United Arab Emirates (UAE)	4:26.466

=== Finals ===
==== 7–8 ====
Rank	Team	Time	Notes
7	United Arab Emirates (UAE); Majid Al-Balooshi; Badr Mirza; Ahmed Al-Mansoori; Yousif Mirza	4:27.280	
8	Iran (IRI); Ali Khademi; Hamid Beikkhormizi; Behnam Arian; Mohammad Rajabloo	4:27.861	

==== 5–6 ====
Rank	Team	Time	Notes
5	Hong Kong (HKG); Ko Siu Wai; Wu Lok Chun; Cheung King Lok; Leung Chun Wing	4:18.369	
6	Uzbekistan (UZB); Ruslan Fedorov; Sergey Medvedev; Vladimir Tuychiev; Timur Gumerov	4:24.771	

==== Bronze ====
Rank	Team	Time	Notes
3rd place, bronze medalist(s)	Japan (JPN); Shogo Ichimaru; Kazushige Kuboki; Eiya Hashimoto; Ryo Chikatani	4:08.474	
4	Kazakhstan (KAZ); Dias Omirzakov; Nikita Panassenko; Robert Gaineyev; Artyom Zakharov	4:16.883	

==== Gold ====
Rank	Team	Time	Notes
1st place, gold medalist(s)	China (CHN); Shi Tao; Yuan Zhong; Qin Chenlu; Liu Hao	4:07.936	
2nd place, silver medalist(s)	South Korea (KOR); Im Jae-yeon; Park Sang-hoon; Park Seon-ho; Park Keon-woo	4:12.269	
