= Ryo Chikatani =

Japanese cyclist (born 1992)

Personal information
- Full name: Ryo Chikatani; Japanese: 近谷 涼
- Born: 17 April 1992 (age 34) Imizu, Japan
- Height: 1.85 m (6 ft 1 in)
- Weight: 72 kg (159 lb)

Cycling career
- Sport: Cycling
- Disciplines: Track; Road
- Role: Rider

Amateur team
- 2014: Sanwa Shutter

Professional teams
- 2015–2016: Matrix Powertag
- 2017–2022: Bridgestone–Anchor
Medal record
Representing Japan
Men's track cycling
Asian Games
Silver medal – second place	2018 Jakarta-Palembang	Individual pursuit
Bronze medal – third place	2014 Incheon	Team pursuit
Bronze medal – third place	2018 Jakarta-Palembang	Team pursuit
Asian Championships
Gold medal – first place	2018 Nilai	Individual pursuit
Gold medal – first place	2018 Nilai	Team pursuit
Gold medal – first place	2020 Jincheon	Team pursuit
Silver medal – second place	2015 Nakhon Ratchasima	Team pursuit
Silver medal – second place	2016 Izu	Team pursuit
Silver medal – second place	2019 Jakarta	Team pursuit
Bronze medal – third place	2015 Nakhon Ratchasima	Individual pursuit
Bronze medal – third place	2017 New Delhi	Team pursuit

Ryo Chikatani (近谷 涼, Chikatani Ryō; born 17 April 1992) is a Japanese track and road cyclist, who last rode for UCI Continental team Team Bridgestone Cycling. He won the silver medal in the team pursuit at the 2016 Asian Cycling Championships. He is a Keirin racer since 2022.

== Major results ==
=== Track ===
2014
3rd Team pursuit, Asian Games
2015
Asian Championships

2nd Team pursuit
3rd Individual pursuit

2016
1st Individual pursuit, National Championships
2nd Team pursuit, Asian Championships
2017
National Championships

1st Individual pursuit
1st Madison

UCI World Cup

2nd Team pursuit, Santiago

2nd Team pursuit, Asian Championships
2018
Asian Championships

1st Individual pursuit
1st Team pursuit (with Shunsuke Imamura, Shogo Ichimaru & Keitaro Sawada)

National Championships

1st Team pursuit
1st Madison
2nd Individual pursuit

Asian Games

2nd Individual pursuit
3rd Team pursuit

2019
National Championships

1st Team pursuit
2nd Madison
2nd Individual pursuit
3rd Points race

2nd Team pursuit, Asian Championships
2020
1st Team pursuit, Asian Championships (with Kazushige Kuboki, Shunsuke Imamura, Keitaro Sawada & Eiya Hashimoto)
1st Team pursuit, National Championships

=== Road ===
2018
2nd Time trial, National Road Championships
