= List of Indonesian records in track cycling =

The following are the national records in track cycling in Indonesia, maintained by its national cycling federation, Indonesian Cycling Federation.

== Men ==
Event	Record	Athlete	Date	Meet	Place	Ref
Flying 200 m time trial	10.185	Dika Alif Dhentaka	30 September 2026	Asian Games	Izu, Japan	
250m time trial (standing start)	18.896	Dika Alif Dhentaka	14 June 2023	Asian Championships	Nilai, Malaysia	
Flying 500 m time trial						
500 m time trial	33.107	Terry Kusuma	11 January 2019	Asian Championships	Jakarta, Indonesia	
Flying 1 km time trial						
1 km time trial	1:02.350	Dika Alif Dhentaka	31 March 2026	Asian Championships	Tagaytay, Philippines	
Team sprint	46.000	Dika Alif Dhentaka; Mochamad Bintang Syawal; Fandi Jolata	14 June 2023	Asian Championships	Nilai, Malaysia	
4000 m individual pursuit	4:18.593	Muhammad Andy Royan	30 March 2026	Asian Championships	Tagaytay, Philippines	
4000 m team pursuit	4:05.355	Bernard Van Aert; Muhammad Andy Royan; Terry Yudha Kusuma; Julian Abi Manyu	14 March 2025	Nations Cup	Konya, Turkey	
Hour record						

== Women ==
Event	Record	Athlete	Date	Meet	Place	Ref
Flying 200 m time trial	11.157	Chrismonita Putri	11 January 2019	Asian Championships	Jakarta, Indonesia	
250 m time trial (standing start)	19.885	Wiji Lestari	19 June 2023	Asian Championships	Nilai, Malaysia	
500 m time trial	35.133	Wiji Lestari	19 June 2023	Asian Championships	Nilai, Malaysia	
Team sprint (500 m)	35.648	Wiji Lestari; Chrismonita Putri	9 January 2019	Asian Championships	Jakarta, Indonesia	
Team sprint (750 m)	52.604	Wiji Lestari; Ratu Afifah Nur Indah; Imelda Tabita Deswari Putri	14 June 2023	Asian Championships	Nilai, Malaysia	
3000 m individual pursuit	3:46.884	Ayustina Priyatna	16 June 2023	Asian Championships	Nilai, Malaysia	
4000 m individual pursuit	5:26.033	Hadenova Majid An Naafi Putri	28 March 2026	Asian Championships	Tagaytay, Philippines	
4000 m team pursuit	4:46.835	Ayustina Priyatna; Imelda Tabita Deswari Putri; Liontin Evangelina Setiawan; Dewika Mulya Sova	23 February 2023	Nations Cup	Jakarta, Indonesia	
Hour record						
