= List of Emirati records in track cycling =

The following are the national records in track cycling in United Arab Emirates, maintained by its national cycling federation, U.A.E. Cycling Federation.

== Men ==
Event	Record	Athlete	Date	Meet	Place	Ref
Flying 200 m time trial						
Flying 500 m time trial						
500 m time trial						
Flying 1 km time trial						
1 km time trial						
Team sprint						
4000 m individual pursuit	4:14.113	Mohammad Al-Mutaiwei	30 March 2026	Asian Championships	Tagaytay, Philippines	
4000 m team pursuit						
Hour record						

== Women ==
Event	Record	Athlete	Date	Meet	Place	Ref
Flying 200 m time trial						
Flying 500 m time trial						
500 m time trial						
Team sprint						
3000 m individual pursuit	4:06.496	Zahra Hussain	6 August 2022	Islamic Solidarity Games	Konya, Turkey	
3000 m team pursuit						
Hour record						
