= Shunsuke Imamura =

Japanese cyclist (born 1998)

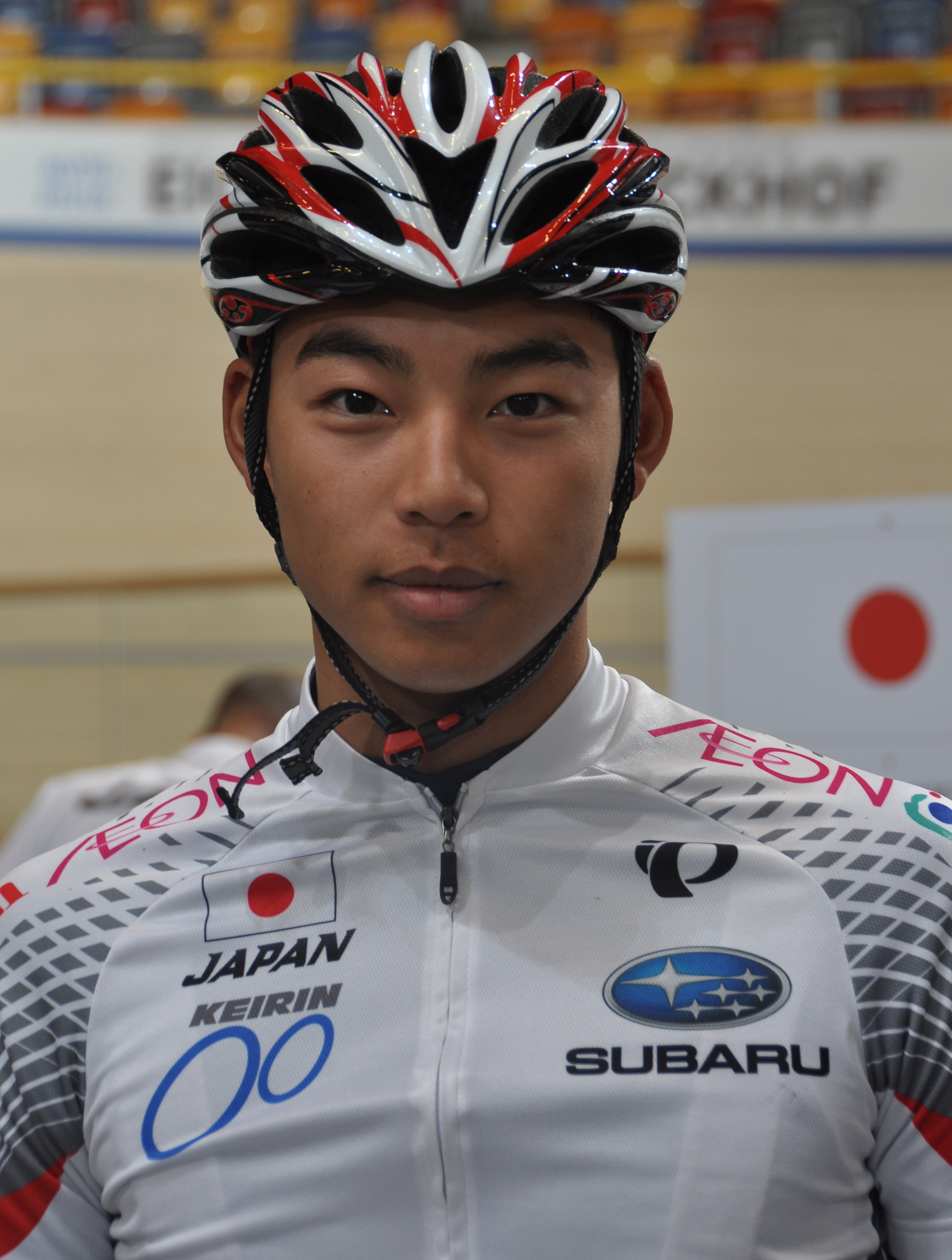
- Imamura in 2016

Personal information
- Born: 14 February 1998 (age 28) Ukiha, Japan
- Height: 1.75 m (5 ft 9 in)
- Weight: 75 kg (165 lb)

Cycling career
- Sport: Cycling
- Current team: Wanty–Nippo–ReUz
- Disciplines: Track; Road
- Role: Rider

Professional teams
- 2018–2024: Team Bridgestone Cycling
- 2025–: Wanty–Nippo–ReUz

Major wins
- One-day races and Classics National Time Trial Championships (2025)
Medal record
Men's track cycling
Representing Japan
World Championships
Bronze medal – third place	2023 Glasgow	Omnium
Asian Games
Gold medal – first place	2022 Hangzhou	Team pursuit
Gold medal – first place	2022 Hangzhou	Madison
Bronze medal – third place	2018 Jakarta-Palembang	Madison
Bronze medal – third place	2018 Jakarta-Palembang	Team pursuit
Asian Championships
Gold medal – first place	2018 Nilai	Team pursuit
Gold medal – first place	2020 Jincheon	Team pursuit
Gold medal – first place	2022 New Delhi	Team pursuit
Gold medal – first place	2022 New Delhi	Madison
Gold medal – first place	2022 New Delhi	Omnium
Gold medal – first place	2023 Nilai	Madison
Gold medal – first place	2024 New Delhi	Madison
Gold medal – first place	2024 New Delhi	Elimination
Gold medal – first place	2024 New Delhi	Team pursuit
Silver medal – second place	2023 Nilai	Scratch
Silver medal – second place	2024 New Delhi	Scratch

Shunsuke Imamura (今村駿介, Imamura Shunsuke; born 14 February 1998) is a Japanese track and road cyclist, who currently rides for UCI Continental team Wanty–Nippo–ReUz.

== Major results ==
=== Track ===
2015
1st Points race, UCI Junior World Championships
2016
1st Points race, Asian Junior Championships
2017
National Championships

1st Team pursuit (with Hiroto Harai, Yuto Takahashi & Riku Hashimoto)
1st Points race

UCI World Cup

2nd Team pursuit, Santiago

2018
1st Team pursuit, Asian Championships (with Ryo Chikatani, Shogo Ichimaru & Keitaro Sawada)
National Championships

2nd Team pursuit
3rd Points race

Asian Games

3rd Madison (with Eiya Hashimoto)
3rd Team pursuit

2019
National Championships

1st Team pursuit
2nd Madison (with Ryo Chikatani)
2nd Points race

2020
1st Team pursuit, Asian Championships (with Kazushige Kuboki, Ryo Chikatani, Keitaro Sawada & Eiya Hashimoto)
2021
National Championships

1st Team pursuit
1st Individual pursuit
1st Points race
1st Scratch
1st Elimination race
1st Madison (with Tetsuo Yamamoto)
2nd Omnium

UCI Nations Cup, Hong Kong

3rd Madison (with Eiya Hashimoto)
3rd Team pursuit

2022
Asian Championships

1st Madison (with Kazushige Kuboki)
1st Omnium
1st Team pursuit

National Championships

1st Madison (with Kazushige Kuboki)
1st Team pursuit
2nd Individual pursuit
2nd Points race
2nd Omnium
2nd Elimination race
3rd Scratch

2nd Madison (with Kazushige Kuboki), UCI Nations Cup, Glasgow
2023
3rd Omnium, UCI World Championships

=== Road ===
2019
National Under-23 Road Championships

1st Time trial
3rd Road race

6th Oita Urban Classic
2022
Tour de Hokkaido

1st Points classification
1st Stage 1 & 3

2025
1st Time trial, National Road Championships
1st Stage 2 Tour de Kumano
10th Overall Arden Challenge
