= Guo Liang (cyclist) =

Chinese cyclist

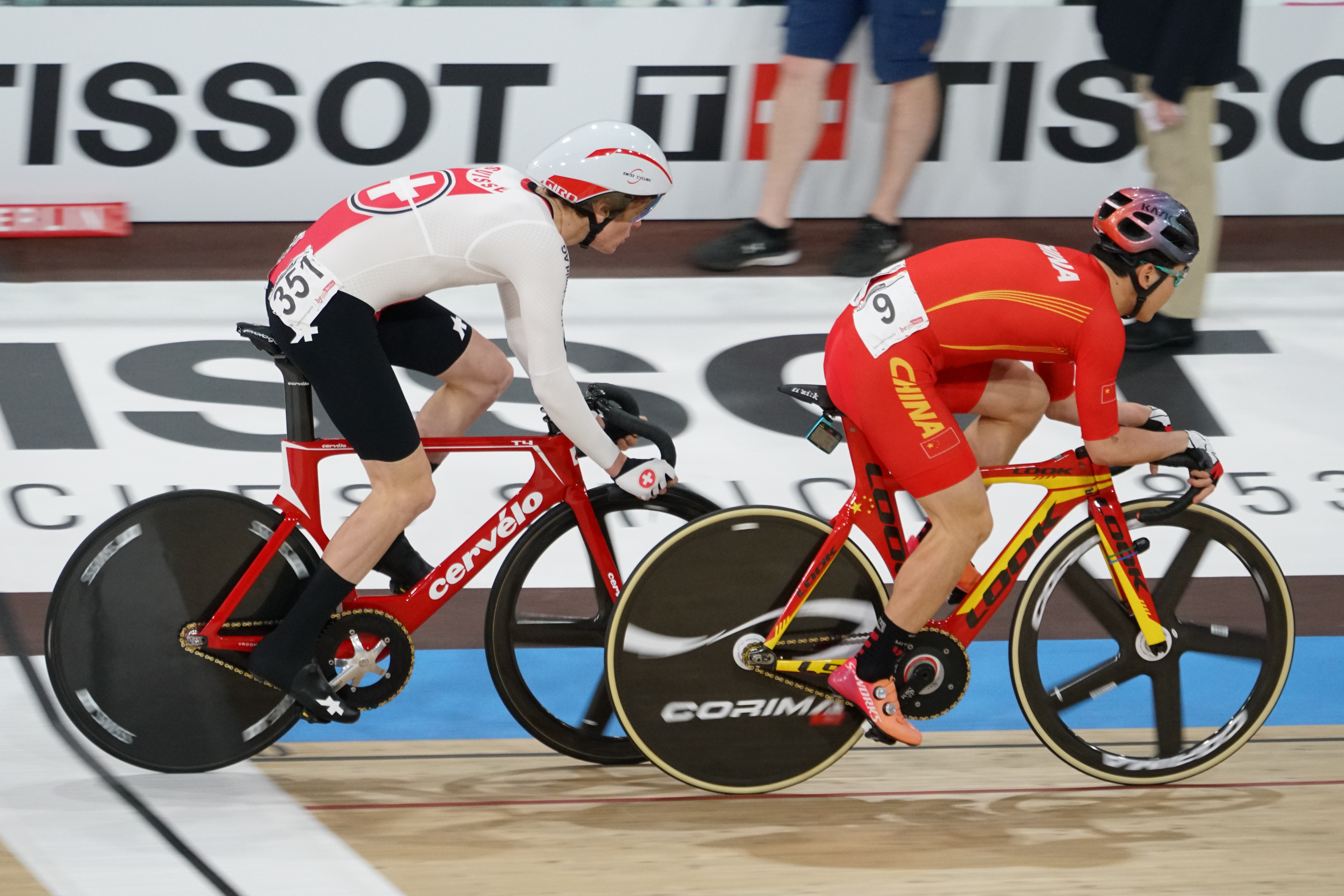
- Guo (front) in 2020

Personal information
- Full name: Guo Liang
- Born: 24 December 1998 (age 27)

Cycling career
- Sport: Cycling
- Disciplines: Track; Road
- Role: Rider

Professional teams
- 2018: Giant Cycling Team
- 2019: Mitchelton–BikeExchange
Medal record
Representing China
Men's track cycling
Asian Games
Gold medal – first place	2018 Jakarta-Palembang	Team pursuit
Asian Championships
Gold medal – first place	2018 Nilai	Scratch
Silver medal – second place	2019 Jakarta	Madison

Guo Liang (Chinese: 郭亮; pinyin: Guō Liàng; born 24 December 1998) is a Chinese racing cyclist, who last rode for UCI Continental team Mitchelton–BikeExchange. He won the scratch event at the 2018 Asian Cycling Championships and the gold medal in the team pursuit at the 2018 Asian Games, with Qin Chenlu, Xue Chaohua and Shen Pingan. He also competed at the 2019 and 2020 UCI Track Cycling World Championships.

== Major results ==
2018
1st Scratch, Asian Track Championships
1st Team pursuit, Asian Games
2019
1st Scratch, 2018–19 UCI Track Cycling World Cup, Hong Kong
2nd Madison, Asian Track Championships
