= Cycling at the 2014 Asian Games – Men's omnium =

Men's omnium at the 2014 Asian Games
- Venue: Incheon International Velodrome
- Date: 22–23 September 2014
- Competitors: 12 from 12 nations

Medalists
gold medal	Eiya Hashimoto	Japan
silver medal	Cho Ho-sung	South Korea
bronze medal	Cheung King Lok	Hong Kong

The men's omnium competition at the 2014 Asian Games was held on 22 and 23 September 2014 at the Incheon International Velodrome.

== Schedule ==
All times are Korea Standard Time (UTC+09:00)

Date	Time	Event
Monday, 22 September 2014	10:35	Scratch race
Monday, 22 September 2014	16:42	Individual pursuit
Monday, 22 September 2014	18:18	Elimination race
Tuesday, 23 September 2014	10:20	1 km time trial
Tuesday, 23 September 2014	16:12	Flying lap
Tuesday, 23 September 2014	17:38	Points race

== Results ==
Legend

- DNF — Did not finish

=== Scratch race ===
Rank	Athlete	Laps down	Points
1	Yousif Mirza (UAE)		40
2	Artyom Zakharov (KAZ)		38
3	Cho Ho-sung (KOR)		36
4	Liu Hao (CHN)		34
5	Eiya Hashimoto (JPN)		32
6	Hossein Nateghi (IRI)		30
7	Cheung King Lok (HKG)		28
8	Wu Po-hung (TPE)		26
9	Timur Gumerov (UZB)		24
10	Sultan Assiri (KSA)	DNF	−40
11	Moosa Khalfan Said (QAT)	DNF	−40
12	Abdulhadi Al-Ajmi (KUW)	DNF	−40

=== Individual pursuit ===
Rank	Athlete	Time	Points
1	Artyom Zakharov (KAZ)	4:29.185	40
2	Cho Ho-sung (KOR)	4:34.419	38
3	Liu Hao (CHN)	4:34.568	36
4	Cheung King Lok (HKG)	4:34.719	34
5	Wu Po-hung (TPE)	4:39.379	32
6	Yousif Mirza (UAE)	4:40.844	30
7	Hossein Nateghi (IRI)	4:41.135	28
8	Timur Gumerov (UZB)	4:41.860	26
9	Eiya Hashimoto (JPN)	4:44.685	24
10	Moosa Khalfan Said (QAT)	4:53.059	22
11	Sultan Assiri (KSA)	4:59.710	20
12	Abdulhadi Al-Ajmi (KUW)	5:27.955	18

=== Elimination race ===
Rank	Athlete	Points
1	Cho Ho-sung (KOR)	40
2	Liu Hao (CHN)	38
3	Cheung King Lok (HKG)	36
4	Wu Po-hung (TPE)	34
5	Timur Gumerov (UZB)	32
6	Hossein Nateghi (IRI)	30
7	Artyom Zakharov (KAZ)	28
8	Yousif Mirza (UAE)	26
9	Moosa Khalfan Said (QAT)	24
10	Sultan Assiri (KSA)	22
11	Eiya Hashimoto (JPN)	20
12	Abdulhadi Al-Ajmi (KUW)	18

=== 1km time trial ===
Rank	Athlete	Time	Points
1	Cho Ho-sung (KOR)	1:05.240	40
2	Artyom Zakharov (KAZ)	1:05.697	38
3	Liu Hao (CHN)	1:05.822	36
4	Wu Po-hung (TPE)	1:06.364	34
5	Eiya Hashimoto (JPN)	1:07.029	32
6	Cheung King Lok (HKG)	1:07.801	30
7	Timur Gumerov (UZB)	1:08.240	28
8	Hossein Nateghi (IRI)	1:08.329	26
9	Moosa Khalfan Said (QAT)	1:09.848	24
10	Yousif Mirza (UAE)	1:10.197	22
11	Sultan Assiri (KSA)	1:15.021	20
12	Abdulhadi Al-Ajmi (KUW)	1:21.983	18

=== Flying lap ===
Rank	Athlete	Time	Points
1	Cho Ho-sung (KOR)	17.960	40
2	Artyom Zakharov (KAZ)	18.366	38
3	Wu Po-hung (TPE)	18.489	36
4	Liu Hao (CHN)	18.615	34
5	Eiya Hashimoto (JPN)	18.670	32
6	Cheung King Lok (HKG)	18.931	30
7	Hossein Nateghi (IRI)	19.434	28
8	Moosa Khalfan Said (QAT)	19.572	26
9	Timur Gumerov (UZB)	19.590	24
10	Yousif Mirza (UAE)	19.645	22
11	Sultan Assiri (KSA)	21.097	20
12	Abdulhadi Al-Ajmi (KUW)	23.215	18

=== Points race ===
Rank	Athlete	Sprint																				Laps		Total	Finish order
Rank	Athlete	1	2	3	4	5	6	7	8	9	10	11	12	13	14	15	16	17	18	19	20	+	−	Total	Finish order
1	Eiya Hashimoto (JPN)			5		5			2	5		2		2		2	5			5	1	60		94	4
2	Timur Gumerov (UZB)		1	1				5					5	5	1		2	3	1	2		60		86	8
3	Yousif Mirza (UAE)	2		3		1				2	2	3		1	5		1				5	60		85	1
4	Cheung King Lok (HKG)				3	3	5		5			1				1		5	5	1	2	40		71	3
5	Hossein Nateghi (IRI)		2	2	1									3	2			1	2		3	40		56	2
6	Wu Po-hung (TPE)								3						3							40		46	6
7	Cho Ho-sung (KOR)	5				2	1	3			5	5	1			5	3	2	3	3				38	5
8	Liu Hao (CHN)	1	5		5		3	1		3	3		2			3								26	9
9	Artyom Zakharov (KAZ)	3	3		2		2	2	1	1	1		3											18	7
10	Sultan Assiri (KSA)																						20	−20	10
11	Moosa Khalfan Said (QAT)																						40	DNF	
—	Abdulhadi Al-Ajmi (KUW)																						20	DNF	

=== Summary ===
Rank	Athlete	Scratch race	Ind. pursuit	Elim. race	Time trial	Flying lap	Points race	Total
1st place, gold medalist(s)	Eiya Hashimoto (JPN)	32	24	20	32	32	94	234
2nd place, silver medalist(s)	Cho Ho-sung (KOR)	36	38	40	40	40	38	232
3rd place, bronze medalist(s)	Cheung King Lok (HKG)	28	34	36	30	30	71	229
4	Yousif Mirza (UAE)	40	30	26	22	22	85	225
5	Timur Gumerov (UZB)	24	26	32	28	24	86	220
6	Wu Po-hung (TPE)	26	32	34	34	36	46	208
7	Liu Hao (CHN)	34	36	38	36	34	26	204
8	Artyom Zakharov (KAZ)	38	40	28	38	38	18	200
9	Hossein Nateghi (IRI)	30	28	30	26	28	56	198
10	Sultan Assiri (KSA)	−40	20	22	20	20	−20	22
11	Moosa Khalfan Said (QAT)	−40	22	24	24	26	−100	−44
—	Abdulhadi Al-Ajmi (KUW)	−40	18	18	18	18	DNF	DNF
