= Cycling at the 2018 Asian Games – Men's madison =

Men's madison at the 2018 Asian Games
- Venue: Jakarta International Velodrome
- Date: 31 August 2018
- Competitors: 24 from 12 nations

Medalists
| gold medal | Cheung King Lok; Leung Chun Wing | Hong Kong |
| silver medal | Park Sang-hoon; Kim Ok-cheol | South Korea |
| bronze medal | Eiya Hashimoto; Shunsuke Imamura | Japan |

The men's madison competition at the 2018 Asian Games was held on 31 August at the Jakarta International Velodrome.

== Schedule ==
All times are Western Indonesia Time (UTC+07:00)

| Date | Time | Event |
|---|---|---|
| Friday, 31 August 2018 | 14:08 | Final |

== Results ==
Legend

- DNF — Did not finish

| Rank | Team | Sprint | | | | | | | | | | | | | | | | Laps | | Total | Finish order |
| Rank | Team | 1 | 2 | 3 | 4 | 5 | 6 | 7 | 8 | 9 | 10 | 11 | 12 | 13 | 14 | 15 | 16 | + | − | Total | Finish order |
|---|---|---|---|---|---|---|---|---|---|---|---|---|---|---|---|---|---|---|---|---|---|
| 1st place, gold medalist(s) | Hong Kong (HKG); Cheung King Lok; Leung Chun Wing | 2 | | | 1 | 2 | 5 | | | 3 | 3 | 1 | 5 | 1 | 5 | 5 | 6 | 20 | | 59 | 2 |
| 2nd place, silver medalist(s) | South Korea (KOR); Park Sang-hoon; Kim Ok-cheol | 1 | 2 | 3 | 5 | 1 | 3 | | | 2 | 5 | 3 | 3 | 5 | | | | 20 | | 53 | 8 |
| 3rd place, bronze medalist(s) | Japan (JPN); Eiya Hashimoto; Shunsuke Imamura | | | 5 | | 5 | 1 | | | | 2 | 2 | | | | 3 | 10 | 20 | 20 | 28 | 1 |
| 4 | Kazakhstan (KAZ); Assylkhan Turar; Sultanmurat Miraliyev | | 1 | | 3 | 3 | 2 | 5 | 5 | 5 | | | | | 3 | 2 | 4 | | 20 | 13 | 3 |
| 5 | Uzbekistan (UZB); Andrey Izmaylov; Muradjan Khalmuratov | | | | | | | 3 | 1 | | | 5 | | 3 | | | | | 20 | −8 | 5 |
| 6 | China (CHN); Guo Liang; Qin Chenlu | 5 | | | | | | 1 | | | 1 | | | 2 | | | 2 | | 20 | −9 | 4 |
| 7 | Indonesia (INA); Projo Waseso; Bernard Van Aert | | 3 | 1 | | | | | | 1 | | | | | 2 | 1 | | | 20 | −12 | 7 |
| 8 | Iran (IRI); Mehdi Sohrabi; Mohammad Rajabloo | 3 | 5 | 2 | | | | 2 | 3 | | | | 2 | | 1 | | | | 40 | −22 | 6 |
| 9 | United Arab Emirates (UAE); Yousif Mirza; Ahmed Al-Mansoori | | | | 2 | | | | 2 | | | | 1 | | | | | | 40 | −35 | |
| — | Macau (MAC); Lao Long San; Kok Mun Wa | | | | | | | | | | | | | | | | | | 40 | DNF | |
| — | Malaysia (MAS); Danieal Haikkal; Irwandie Lakasek | | | | | | | | | | | | | | | | | | 40 | DNF | |
| — | Thailand (THA); Turakit Boonratanathanakorn; Sarawut Sirironnachai | | | | | | | | | | | | | | | | | | 40 | DNF | |
