= Cycling at the 2026 Asian Games – Men's madison =

Men's madison at the 2026 Asian Games
- Venue: Izu Velodrome
- Dates: 2 October 2026
- Competitors: 22 from 11 nations

Medalists
gold medal	Naoki Kojima; Kazushige Kuboki	Japan
silver medal	Wu Junjie; Sun Haijiao	China
bronze medal	Sergey Rostovtsev; Nikita Tsvetkov	Uzbekistan

The men's madison event at the 2026 Asian Games was held on 2 October 2026.

== Schedule ==
All times are Japan Standard Time (UTC+09:00)

Date	Time	Event
Friday, 2 October 2026	15:46	Finals

== Results ==
Legend

- DNF — Did not finish

Rank	Team	Sprint																				Laps		Total	Finish order
Rank	Team	1	2	3	4	5	6	7	8	9	10	11	12	13	14	15	16	17	18	19	20	+	−	Total	Finish order
1st place, gold medalist(s)	Japan (JPN); Naoki Kojima; Kazushige Kuboki	5		3	5	3	2		5	5	5	5	3	3		2	5	5	5	5	10			76	1
2nd place, silver medalist(s)	China (CHN); Wu Junjie; Sun Haijiao					5	5	5				3	5	5						3	4	20		55	3
3rd place, bronze medalist(s)	Uzbekistan (UZB); Sergey Rostovtsev; Nikita Tsvetkov	3	2	2	1		1	2	3	1	1		2	2	5	5	3	3	2	1	6			45	2
4	South Korea (KOR); Hong Seung-min; Min Kyeong-ho						3			2	2				3	1	2	2	3	2				20	5
5	Kazakhstan (KAZ); Ramis Dinmukhametov; Ilya Karabutov	1	3	1	2	2		3	2	3	3	1	1	1	2			1					20	6	6
6	Hong Kong (HKG); Chu Tsun Wai; Tso Kai Kwong		1												1	3	1							6	8
7	Chinese Taipei (TPE); Li Jing-feng; Xu Shi-ru		5	5	3	1		1	1												2		20	–2	4
8	India (IND); Harshveer Sekhon; Vishavjeet Singh																		1				40	–39	7
9	Indonesia (INA); Terry Yudha Kusuma; Muhammad Andy Royan	2										2											40	DNF	
9	United Arab Emirates (UAE); Abdulla Al-Hammadi; Ahmed Al-Mansoori																							DNF	
9	Macau (MAC); Lao Long San; Cheang Shing Hei																						40	DNF	
