= Kazushige Kuboki =

Japanese cyclist (born 1989)

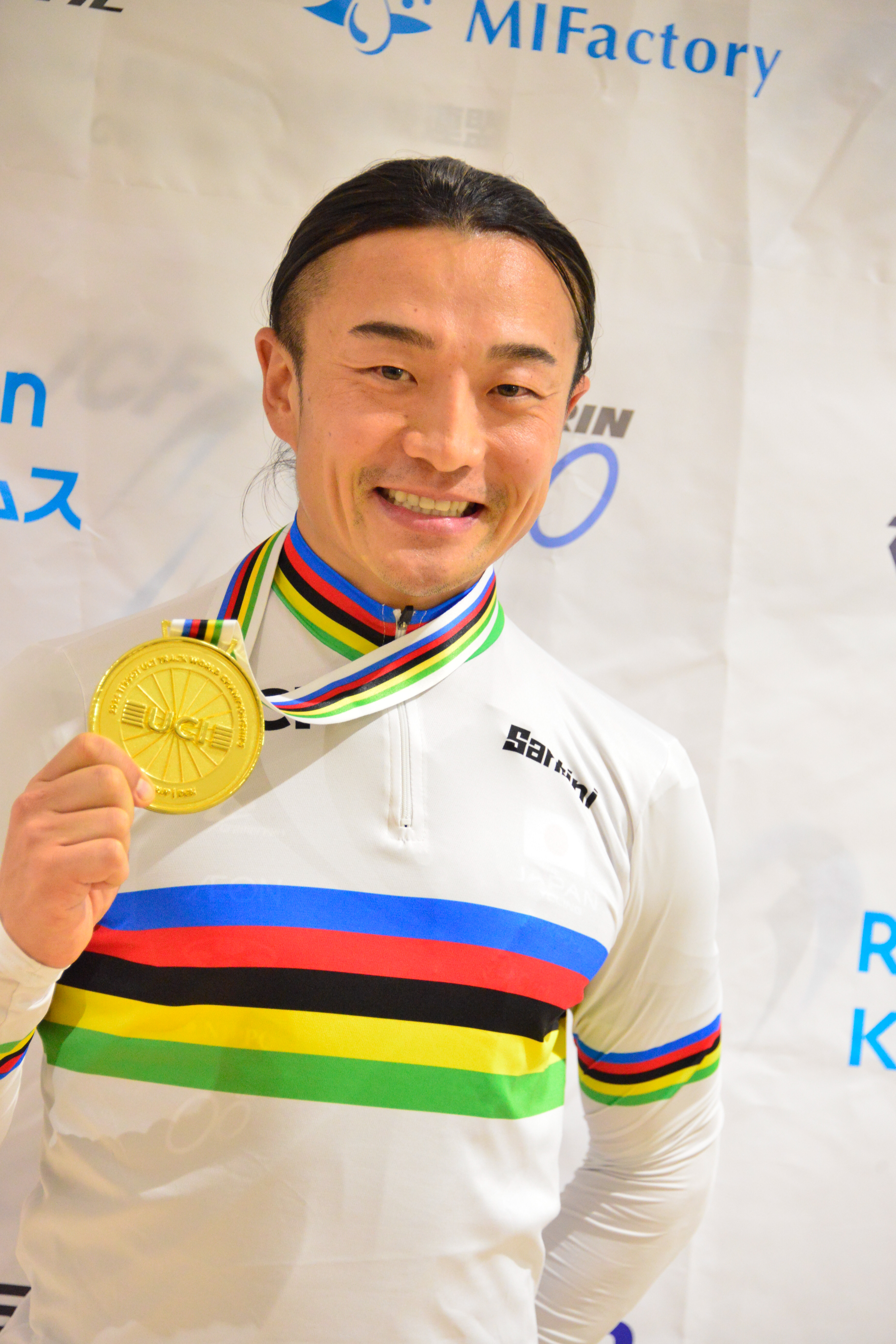
- Kuboki in October 2024

Personal information
- Full name: Kazushige Kuboki; Japanese: 窪木 一茂
- Born: 6 June 1989 (age 37) Furudono, Fukushima, Japan
- Height: 1.73 m (5 ft 8 in)
- Weight: 68 kg (150 lb)

Cycling career
- Sport: Cycling
- Current team: Team Bridgestone Cycling
- Disciplines: Road; Track
- Role: Rider

Professional teams
- 2012–2013: Matrix Powertag
- 2014–2015: Team UKYO
- 2016–2017: Nippo–Vini Fantini
- 2018–2024: Team Bridgestone Cycling
- 2025–: Aisan Racing Team

Major wins
- Road One-day races and Classics National Road Race Championships (2015) National Time Trial Championships (2018) Track World Championships Scratch (2024)
Medal record
Men's track cycling
Representing Japan
Event	1st	2nd	3rd
World Championships	1	3	0
Asian Games	3	1	1
Asian Championships	11	8	5
Total	15	12	6
World Championships
Gold medal – first place	2024 Ballerup	Scratch
Silver medal – second place	2022 Saint-Quentin-en-Yvelines	Scratch
Silver medal – second place	2023 Glasgow	Scratch
Silver medal – second place	2025 Santiago	Omnium
Asian Games
Gold medal – first place	2022 Hangzhou	Omnium
Gold medal – first place	2022 Hangzhou	Team pursuit
Gold medal – first place	2026 Aichi–Nagoya	Madison
Silver medal – second place	2026 Aichi–Nagoya	Team pursuit
Bronze medal – third place	2014 Incheon	Team pursuit
Asian Championships
Gold medal – first place	2020 Jincheon	Team pursuit
Gold medal – first place	2022 New Delhi	Team pursuit
Gold medal – first place	2022 New Delhi	Madison
Gold medal – first place	2023 Nilai	Individual pursuit
Gold medal – first place	2023 Nilai	Madison
Gold medal – first place	2023 Nilai	Team pursuit
Gold medal – first place	2024 New Delhi	Team pursuit
Gold medal – first place	2024 New Delhi	Madison
Gold medal – first place	2025 Nilai	Individual pursuit
Gold medal – first place	2025 Nilai	Madison
Gold medal – first place	2026 Tagaytay	Madison
Silver medal – second place	2013 New Delhi	Team pursuit
Silver medal – second place	2015 Nakhon Ratchasima	Team pursuit
Silver medal – second place	2016 Izu	Team pursuit
Silver medal – second place	2019 Jakarta	Team pursuit
Silver medal – second place	2020 Jincheon	Madison
Silver medal – second place	2025 Nilai	Scratch
Silver medal – second place	2025 Nilai	Team pursuit
Silver medal – second place	2026 Tagaytay	Team pursuit
Bronze medal – third place	2011 Nakhon Ratchasima	Individual pursuit
Bronze medal – third place	2011 Nakhon Ratchasima	Madison
Bronze medal – third place	2011 Nakhon Ratchasima	Team pursuit
Bronze medal – third place	2013 New Delhi	Omnium
Bronze medal – third place	2019 Jakarta	Madison

Kazushige Kuboki (窪木 一茂, Kuboki Kazushige; born 6 June 1989) is a Japanese professional racing cyclist, who currently rides for UCI Continental team Team Bridgestone Cycling. He rode at the 2015 UCI Track Cycling World Championships. In June 2015, he won the Japanese National Road Race Championships. He also competed at the 2014 Asian Games. In October 2015, he announced that he would ride for Nippo–Vini Fantini in 2016.

== Career ==
Kazushige Kuboki first attracted attention when he finished eighth overall in the 2007 Tour de l'Abitibi, a junior stage race in Canada.

Kuboki won two bronze medals at the 2011 Asian Championships in the individual pursuit, team sprint, and team pursuit events. The following year, Kuboki became the Japanese champion in the points race. At the 2013 Asian Cycling Championships, he won silver in the team pursuit and bronze in the omnium. In 2014, Kazushige became the national champion in the omnium. He also won bronze in the team pursuit at the 2013 Asian Cycling Championships. On the road, he won the points classification at the Tour de Hokkaido.

In 2015, he became national champion in the road race, his greatest success to date on the road. Following this, he signed a contract with the Italian second-division team Nippo–Vini Fantini–Faizanè for the following year. He also won silver medals in the team pursuit at the Asian Cycling Championships in both 2015 and 2016.

In 2018, he became the Japanese champion in the individual time trial event. After numerous second and third place finishes in previous years, he became a two-time Asian champion in 2020, winning the team pursuit title alongside teammates Ryo Chikatani, Shunsuke Imamura, Eiya Hashimoto, and Keitaro Sawada. He won this title three more times in the following years, and from 2022 to 2024, he added three titles in the two-man team pursuit event, all alongside Imamura. His individual pursuit title in 2023 also earned him an Asian championship title. At the 2022 and 2023 World Championships, he finished second in the scratch race before becoming world champion in this discipline in 2024.

Kuboki competed twice at the Olympic Games. At the 2016 edition of the games, he finished 14th in the omnium and sixth in the team pursuit. He achieved the same result in the Madison event at the 2024 Olympics as part of a tandem team with Imamura, while he was eliminated in qualifying with the Japanese team pursuit squad.

At the end of 2024, Kuboki left his previous team, Bridgestone, and joined the Aisan Racing Team. At the 2025 Asian Championships, he won three medals and set a new Asian record in the individual pursuit with a time of 4:08.669 minutes.

In 2023, he won two gold medals at the Asian Games in the team pursuit and the omnium. He was again the world championship silver medalist in the scratch race and achieved a triple victory at the Asian Championships in the individual and team pursuit, as well as the Madison. In 2024, he added two more titles at the Asian Championships, again in the team pursuit and the Madison. On October 17, 2024, after two silver medals in the two previous seasons, at the age of 35, Kuboki became world scratch champion thanks to an attack in the last 10 laps.

== Major results ==
=== Road ===
2007
1st Stage 9 Tour de l'Abitibi
3rd Time trial, Asian Junior Championships
2012
3rd Overall Tour de Hokkaido
5th Time trial, National Championships
2013
3rd Time trial, National Championships
5th Overall Jelajah Malaysia
2014
4th Overall Tour de Hokkaido

1st Points classification

9th Time trial, Asian Championships
2015
National Championships

1st Road race
4th Time trial

9th Overall Tour de Hokkaido
2016
8th Overall Tour of China II
2018
1st Time trial, National Championships
2019
1st Stage 8 Tour of Japan
2022
1st Stage 1 Tour de Kumano
2023
1st Stage 8 Tour of Japan

=== Track ===
2011
Asian Championships

3rd Individual pursuit
3rd Team pursuit
3rd Madison

2012
1st Points race, National Championships
2013
Asian Championships

2nd Team pursuit
3rd Omnium

2014
1st Omnium, National Championships
3rd Team pursuit, Asian Games
2015
2nd Team pursuit, Asian Championships
2016
2nd Team pursuit, Asian Championships
2018
National Championships

1st Team pursuit
1st Individual pursuit
1st Points race
1st Madison (with Ryo Chikatani)

2019
National Championships

1st Team pursuit
1st Individual pursuit
1st Points race
1st Madison (with Eiya Hashimoto)

Asian Championships

2nd Team pursuit
3rd Madison (with Eiya Hashimoto)

2020
Asian Championships

1st Team pursuit
2nd Madison (with Eiya Hashimoto)

2021
2nd Scratch, UCI Champions League, London I
UCI Nations Cup, Hong Kong

3rd Scratch
3rd Team pursuit

2022
Asian Championships

1st Team pursuit
1st Madison (with Shunsuke Imamura)

National Championships

1st Team pursuit
1st Individual pursuit
1st Omnium
1st Madison (with Shunsuke Imamura)
2nd Scratch
3rd Points race

2nd Scratch, UCI World Championships
2nd Madison, UCI Nations Cup, Glasgow (with Shunsuke Imamura)
2023
2nd Scratch, UCI World Championships
2024
1st Scratch, UCI World Championships
2025
2nd Omnium, UCI World Championships
3rd Omnium, UCI Nations Cup, Konya
