= Kim Eu-ro =

South Korean bicycle racer

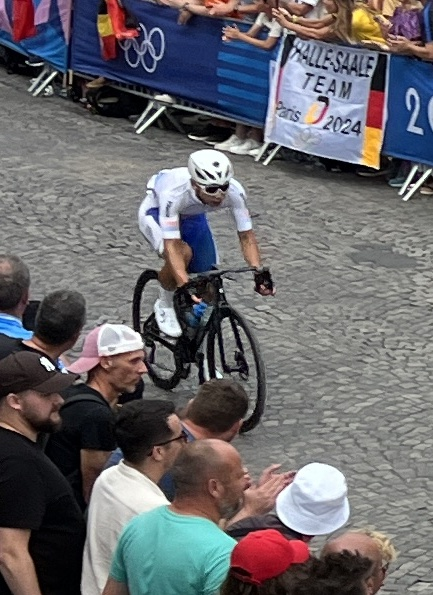
- Kim at the 2024 Olympics

Personal information
- Full name: Kim Eu-ro
- Born: 7 October 1999 (age 27)

Cycling career
- Sport: Cycling
- Current team: LX Cycling Team
- Disciplines: Road; Track
- Role: Rider

Professional team
- 2018–: LX Cycling Team
Medal record
Representing South Korea
Men's track cycling
Asian Games
Silver medal – second place	2022 Hangzhou	Madison
Asian Championships
Gold medal – first place	2020 Jincheon	Points race
Gold medal – first place	2020 Jincheon	Madison
Silver medal – second place	2022 New Delhi	Points race
Silver medal – second place	2025 Nilai	Madison
Men's road cycling
Asian Championships
Gold medal – first place	2024 Almaty	Road race

Kim Eu-ro (born 7 October 1999) is a South Korean cyclist, who currently rides for UCI Continental team LX Cycling Team.

== Major results ==
=== Road ===
2019
1st Road race, National Championships
6th Road race, Asian Under-23 Championships
2022
2nd Road race, National Championships
2023
5th Road race, Asian Championships
2024
1st Road race, Asian Championships
2nd Road race, National Championships
2025
6th Overall Tour de Gyeongnam
2026
1st Road race, National Championships
7th Road race, Asian Championships

=== Track ===
2017
Asian Junior Championships

1st Points race
2nd Team pursuit
3rd Scratch

2020
Asian Championships

1st Points race
1st Madison (with Shin Dong-in)

2022
2nd Madison (with Shin Dong-in), Asian Games
2nd Points race, Asian Championships
