= 2018 Asian Track Cycling Championships =

Cycling tournaments

- Venue: Nilai, Malaysia
- Date: 16–20 February 2018
- Velodrome: Velodrom Nasional Malaysia

The 2018 Asian Track Cycling Championships took place at the Velodrom Nasional Malaysia in Nilai, Malaysia from 16 to 20 February 2018.

== Medal summary ==
=== Men ===
Event	Gold	Silver	Bronze
Sprint	Kazunari Watanabe; Japan	Azizulhasni Awang; Malaysia	Im Chae-bin; South Korea
1 km time trial	Tomohiro Fukaya; Japan	Hsiao Shih-hsin; Chinese Taipei	Mohammad Daneshvar; Iran
Keirin	Tomoyuki Kawabata; Japan	Im Chae-bin; South Korea	Azizulhasni Awang; Malaysia
Individual pursuit	Ryo Chikatani; Japan	Min Kyeong-ho; South Korea	Artyom Zakharov; Kazakhstan
Points race	Yousif Mirza; United Arab Emirates	Cheung King Lok; Hong Kong	Muradjan Khalmuratov; Uzbekistan
Scratch	Guo Liang; China	Arvin Moazzami; Iran	Batsaikhany Tegshbayar; Mongolia
Omnium	Eiya Hashimoto; Japan	Yousif Mirza; United Arab Emirates	Artyom Zakharov; Kazakhstan
Madison	Hong Kong; Cheung King Lok; Leung Chun Wing	Iran; Mohammad Rajabloo; Mehdi Sohrabi	South Korea; Im Jae-yeon; Kim Ok-cheol
Team sprint	South Korea; Im Chae-bin; Park Jeon-e; Son Je-yong	Japan; Kazunari Watanabe; Tomoyuki Kawabata; Yoshitaku Nagasako; Genki Itakura	China; Luo Yongjia; Bi Wenjun; Li Jianxin
Team pursuit	Japan; Ryo Chikatani; Shogo Ichimaru; Shunsuke Imamura; Keitaro Sawada	South Korea; Min Kyeong-ho; Im Jae-yeon; Kim Ok-cheol; Kang Tae-woo	China; Hou Yake; Xue Chaohua; Qin Chenlu; Shen Pingan

=== Women ===
Event	Gold	Silver	Bronze
Sprint	Lee Wai Sze; Hong Kong	Zhong Tianshi; China	Lee Hye-jin; South Korea
500 m time trial	Lee Wai Sze; Hong Kong	Song Chaorui; China	Fatehah Mustapa; Malaysia
Keirin	Lee Wai Sze; Hong Kong	Lee Hye-jin; South Korea	Zhong Tianshi; China
Individual pursuit	Lee Ju-mi; South Korea	Huang Ting-ying; Chinese Taipei	Ma Menglu; China
Points race	Jupha Somnet; Malaysia	Diao Xiaojuan; Hong Kong	Zeng Ke-xin; Chinese Taipei
Scratch	Huang Ting-ying; Chinese Taipei	Diao Xiaojuan; Hong Kong	Wang Xiaofei; China
Omnium	Yumi Kajihara; Japan	Wang Xiaofei; China	Huang Ting-ying; Chinese Taipei
Madison	Japan; Kisato Nakamura; Yumi Kajihara	South Korea; Kim You-ri; Yu Seon-ha	China; Jin Chenhong; Liu Jiali
Team sprint	China; Zhong Tianshi; Song Chaorui; Guo Yufang	South Korea; Lee Hye-jin; Kim Won-gyeong	Japan; Riyu Ota; Kayono Maeda
Team pursuit	Japan; Yuya Hashimoto; Kie Furuyama; Yumi Kajihara; Kisato Nakamura	China; Wang Xiaofei; Liu Juali; Wang Hong; Ma Menglu	South Korea; Yu Seon-ha; Lee Ju-mi; Kim You-ri; Kim Hyun-ji

== Medal table ==
Rank	Nation	Gold	Silver	Bronze	Total
1	Japan	9	1	1	11
2	Hong Kong	4	3	0	7
3	South Korea	2	6	4	12
4	China	2	4	6	12
5	Chinese Taipei	1	2	2	5
6	Malaysia	1	1	2	4
7	United Arab Emirates	1	1	0	2
8	Iran	0	2	1	3
9	Kazakhstan	0	0	2	2
10	Mongolia	0	0	1	1
10	Uzbekistan	0	0	1	1
Totals (11 entries)		20	20	20	60
