= Shi Tao (disambiguation) =

Shi Tao may refer to:

- Shitao (1642–1707), Qing dynasty painter
- Shi Tao (journalist) (born 1968), Chinese journalist known for his 10-year imprisonment
- Shi Tao (cyclist) (born 1992), Chinese track cyclist
