= South Korean National Road Championships =

National road cycling championships in South Korea

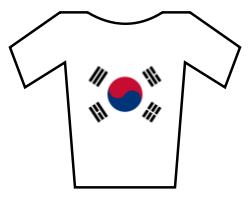

Race details
- Date: June
- Discipline: Road
- Type: One-day race

History
- First edition: 2007

The South Korean National Road Championships are held annually to decide the cycling champions in both the road race and time trial discipline, across various categories.

== Men ==
=== Road race ===
Year	Winner	Second	Third
2007	Park Sung-baek	Kim Dong-young	Choi Jong-gyun
2008	Park Sung-baek	Kim Dong-young	Choi Jong-gyun
2011	Jang Sun-jae	Jeong Eung-seong	Youm Jung-hwan
2012	Jang Chan-jae	Gong Hyo-suk	Jeon Yung-jae
2013	Jung Ji-min	Park Sung-baek	Jang Chan-jae
2014	Seo Joon-yong	Jang Sun-jae	Jang Chan-jae
2015	Park Sang-hong	Kim Ok-cheol	Jung Ha-jeon
2016	Gong Hyo-suk	Jung Woo-ho	Kim Woong-gyeom
2017	Jang Kyung-gu	Jung Woo-ho	Kim Ok-cheol
2018	Seo Joon-yong	Ham Seok-hyun	Kim Woong-gyeom
2019	Kim Eu-ro	Gong Hyo-suk	Kwon Soon-young
2020	Park Sang-hong	Joo Dae-young	Choi Sang-jin
2021	Jang Kyung-gu	Choi Dong-hyeok	Joo Dae-young
2022	Joo Dae-yeong	Kim Eu-ro	Kim Ji-hun

=== Time trial ===
Year	Winner	Second	Third
2007	Youm Jung-hwan	Joo Hyun-wook	Jang Sun-jae
2008	Youm Jung-hwan	Joo Hyun-wook	Jang Sun-jae
2011	Choe Hyeong-min	Youm Jung-hwan	Jang Sun-jae
2015	Jang Kyung-gu	Park Sang-hoon	Park Sung-baek
2016	Choe Hyeong-min	Kim Ji-hun	Jang Kyung-gu
2017	Choe Hyeong-min	Park Sang-hoon	Bang Sun-hwoi
2018	Choe Hyeong-min	Jang Kyung Min	Park Sang-hoon
2019	Choe Hyeong-min	Min Kyeong-ho	Im Jae-yein
2020	Choe Hyeong-min	Min Kyeong-ho	Kim Kook-hyun
2021	Choi Sang-jin	Min Kyeong-ho	Shin Dong-in
2022	Min Kyeong-ho	Choe Hyeong-min	Kim Kook-hyun

== Women ==
Year	Road Race	Time Trial
2007	Young Kyung Chun	Lee Min-hye
2011	Na A-reum	
2012	Son Hee-jung	
2013	Na A-reum	
2014	Na A-reum	
2015	Gu Sung-eun	Lee Ju-mi
2016	Lee Ju-mi	Lee Ju-mi
2017	Na A-reum	Lee Ju-mi
2018	Na A-reum	Na A-reum
2019	Lee Ju-mi	Lee Ju-mi
2020	Na A-reum	Lee Ju-mi
2021	Lee Eun-hee	Shin Ji-eun
2022	Lee Joo-hee	Lee Yeon-kyeong
