= Cycling at the 2018 Asian Games – Men's individual pursuit =

Men's individual pursuit at the 2018 Asian Games
- Venue: Jakarta International Velodrome
- Date: 29 August 2018
- Competitors: 14 from 14 nations

Medalists
gold medal	Park Sang-hoon	South Korea
silver medal	Ryo Chikatani	Japan
bronze medal	Artyom Zakharov	Kazakhstan

The men's individual pursuit competition at the 2018 Asian Games was held on 29 August at the Jakarta International Velodrome.

== Schedule ==
All times are Western Indonesia Time (UTC+07:00)

Date	Time	Event
Wednesday, 29 August 2018	09:55	Qualifying
Wednesday, 29 August 2018	16:56	Finals

== Records ==
Prior to this competition, the existing world, Asian and Games records were as follows.

World Record	Jack Bobridge (AUS)	4:10.534	Sydney, Australia	2 February 2011
Asian Record	Artyom Zakharov (KAZ)	4:19.939	Aguascalientes, Mexico	5 December 2013
Games Record	Jang Sun-jae (KOR)	4:26.089	Guangzhou, China	14 November 2010

== Results ==
=== Qualifying ===
Rank	Athlete	Time	Notes
1	Park Sang-hoon (KOR)	4:19.672	AR
2	Ryo Chikatani (JPN)	4:26.503	
3	Artyom Zakharov (KAZ)	4:29.919	
4	Ko Siu Wai (HKG)	4:33.863	
5	Yuttana Mano (THA)	4:34.805	
6	Li Wen-chao (TPE)	4:34.914	
7	Bernard Van Aert (INA)	4:35.871	
8	Nur Aiman Zariff (MAS)	4:36.723	
9	Tuulkhangain Tögöldör (MGL)	4:40.463	
10	Andrey Izmaylov (UZB)	4:43.155	
11	Shen Pingan (CHN)	4:43.363	
12	Manjeet Singh (IND)	4:43.714	
13	Yahiaaldien Khalefa (BRN)	5:03.289	
14	Tarek Al-Moakee (SYR)	5:04.425	

=== Finals ===
==== Bronze ====
Rank	Athlete	Time	Notes
3rd place, bronze medalist(s)	Artyom Zakharov (KAZ)		
4	Ko Siu Wai (HKG)	Overlapped	

==== Gold ====
Rank	Athlete	Time	Notes
1st place, gold medalist(s)	Park Sang-hoon (KOR)		
2nd place, silver medalist(s)	Ryo Chikatani (JPN)	Overlapped	
