= 2018 Asian Cycling Championships =

The 2018 Asian Cycling Championships may refer to:

- 2018 Asian Road Cycling Championships, a road cycling event held in Myanmar
- 2018 Asian Track Cycling Championships, a track cycling event held in Malaysia
