= Cycling at the 2022 Asian Games – Men's team pursuit =

Men's team pursuit at the 2022 Asian Games
- Venue: Chun'an Jieshou Sports Centre Velodrome
- Dates: 26–27 September 2023
- Competitors: 32 from 7 nations

Medalists
gold medal	Japan; Shoi Matsuda, Kazushige Kuboki, Eiya Hashimoto, Naoki Kojima, Shunsuke Imamura
silver medal	China; Sun Haijiao, Yang Yang, Zhang Haiao, Sun Wentao
bronze medal	South Korea; Kim Hyeon-seok, Min Kyeong-ho, Jang Hun, Shin Dong-in

The men's team pursuit event at the 2022 Asian Games was held on 26 and 27 September 2023.

== Schedule ==
All times are China Standard Time (UTC+08:00)

Date	Time	Event
Tuesday, 26 September 2023	11:36	Qualifying
Tuesday, 26 September 2023	15:48	First round
Wednesday, 27 September 2023	15:46	Finals

== Records ==
Prior to this competition, the existing world, Asian and Games records were as follows.

World Record	Italy	3:42.032	Tokyo, Japan	4 August 2021
Asian Record	Japan	3:51.055	Nilai, Malaysia	14 June 2023
Games Record	South Korea	3:56.247	Jakarta, Indonesia	30 August 2018

== Results ==
Legend

- DSQ — Disqualified

=== Qualifying ===
Rank	Team	Time	Notes
1	Japan (JPN); Shoi Matsuda; Kazushige Kuboki; Eiya Hashimoto; Naoki Kojima	3:58.584	
2	China (CHN); Sun Haijiao; Sun Wentao; Yang Yang; Zhang Haiao	4:01.616	
3	South Korea (KOR); Kim Hyeon-seok; Min Kyeong-ho; Jang Hun; Shin Dong-in	4:02.753	
4	Kazakhstan (KAZ); Ramis Dinmukhametov; Sergey Karmazhakov; Alisher Zhumakan; Dmitriy Noskov	4:06.187	
5	Hong Kong (HKG); Mow Ching Yin; Ko Siu Wai; Ng Pak Hang; Chu Tsun Wai	4:09.972	
6	Uzbekistan (UZB); Edem Eminov; Aleksey Fomovskiy; Dmitriy Bocharov; Danil Evdokimov	4:11.417	
7	India (IND); Vishavjeet Singh; Venkappa Kengalgutti; Niraj Kumar; Dinesh Kumar	4:16.085	

=== First round ===
==== Heat 1 ====
Rank	Team	Time	Notes
1	India (IND); Vishavjeet Singh; Venkappa Kengalgutti; Niraj Kumar; Dinesh Kumar	4:19.114	

==== Heat 2 ====
Rank	Team	Time	Notes
1	Hong Kong (HKG); Mow Ching Yin; Leung Ka Yu; Ng Pak Hang; Chu Tsun Wai	4:02.210	
—	Uzbekistan (UZB); Nikita Tsvetkov; Aleksey Fomovskiy; Dmitriy Bocharov; Danil Evdokimov	DSQ	

==== Heat 3 ====
Rank	Team	Time	Notes
1	China (CHN); Sun Haijiao; Sun Wentao; Yang Yang; Zhang Haiao	3:57.565	
2	South Korea (KOR); Kim Hyeon-seok; Min Kyeong-ho; Jang Hun; Shin Dong-in	4:01.556	

==== Heat 4 ====
Rank	Team	Time	Notes
1	Japan (JPN); Shoi Matsuda; Shunsuke Imamura; Eiya Hashimoto; Naoki Kojima	4:00.843	
2	Kazakhstan (KAZ); Ramis Dinmukhametov; Artyom Zakharov; Alisher Zhumakan; Dmitriy Noskov	4:02.799	

==== Summary ====
Rank	Team	Time
3	South Korea (KOR)	4:01.556
4	Hong Kong (HKG)	4:02.210
5	Kazakhstan (KAZ)	4:02.799
6	India (IND)	4:19.114
DQ	Uzbekistan (UZB)	~~DSQ~~

- Uzbekistan failed to finish the competition originally and also later got disqualified after Aleksey Fomovskiy tested positive for Anabolic steroids.

=== Finals ===
==== Bronze ====
Rank	Team	Time	Notes
3rd place, bronze medalist(s)	South Korea (KOR); Kim Hyeon-seok; Min Kyeong-ho; Jang Hun; Shin Dong-in	3:58.594	
4	Hong Kong (HKG); Mow Ching Yin; Leung Ka Yu; Ng Pak Hang; Chu Tsun Wai	4:05.507	

==== Gold ====
Rank	Team	Time	Notes
1st place, gold medalist(s)	Japan (JPN); Shoi Matsuda; Kazushige Kuboki; Eiya Hashimoto; Naoki Kojima	3:52.757	GR
2nd place, silver medalist(s)	China (CHN); Sun Haijiao; Yang Yang; Zhang Haiao; Sun Wentao	3:56.277	
