= Cycling at the 2018 Asian Games – Men's omnium =

Men's omnium at the 2018 Asian Games
- Venue: Jakarta International Velodrome
- Date: 30 August 2018
- Competitors: 18 from 18 nations

Medalists
gold medal	Eiya Hashimoto	Japan
silver medal	Leung Chun Wing	Hong Kong
bronze medal	Artyom Zakharov	Kazakhstan

The men's omnium competition at the 2018 Asian Games was held on 30 August 2018 at the Jakarta International Velodrome.

== Schedule ==
All times are Western Indonesia Time (UTC+07:00)

Date	Time	Event
Thursday, 30 August 2018	09:00	Scratch race
Thursday, 30 August 2018	11:05	Tempo race
Thursday, 30 August 2018	16:06	Elimination race
Thursday, 30 August 2018	17:25	Points race

== Results ==
Legend

- DNF — Did not finish

=== Scratch race ===
Rank	Athlete	Laps down	Points
1	Mohammad Ganjkhanloo (IRI)		40
2	Lao Long San (MAC)		38
3	Sainbayaryn Jambaljamts (MGL)		36
4	Li Wen-chao (TPE)		34
5	Muradjan Khalmuratov (UZB)		32
6	Artyom Zakharov (KAZ)	−1	30
7	Leung Chun Wing (HKG)	−1	28
8	Eiya Hashimoto (JPN)	−1	26
9	Shin Dong-in (KOR)	−1	24
10	Jiang Zhihui (CHN)	−1	22
11	Nur Aiman Rosli (MAS)	−1	20
12	Yousif Mirza (UAE)	−1	18
13	Patompob Phonarjthan (THA)	−1	16
14	Calvin Sim (SGP)	−1	14
15	Tarek Al-Moakee (SYR)	−1	12
16	Manjeet Singh (IND)	−1	10
17	Nandra Eko Wahyudi (INA)	−1	8
18	Yahiaaldien Khalefa (BRN)	−1	6

=== Tempo race ===
Rank	Athlete	Sprints won	Laps		Total	Finish order	Points
Rank	Athlete	Sprints won	+	−	Total	Finish order	Points
1	Leung Chun Wing (HKG)	7, 8, 9, 11, 13, 15, 20	20		27	16	40
2	Eiya Hashimoto (JPN)	1, 2, 4, 6, 21, 24	20		26	14	38
3	Jiang Zhihui (CHN)	16, 17, 18, 22	20		24	3	36
4	Artyom Zakharov (KAZ)	10, 12, 14, 23	20		24	6	34
5	Shin Dong-in (KOR)	19	20		21	15	32
6	Muradjan Khalmuratov (UZB)		20		20	5	30
7	Sainbayaryn Jambaljamts (MGL)	28, 30, 32, 34, 36			5	1	28
8	Yousif Mirza (UAE)	29, 31, 33, 35			4	2	26
9	Mohammad Ganjkhanloo (IRI)	3, 5, 27			3	17	24
10	Lao Long San (MAC)	26			1	7	22
11	Calvin Sim (SGP)	25			1	12	20
12	Patompob Phonarjthan (THA)				0	4	18
13	Nur Aiman Rosli (MAS)				0	8	16
14	Li Wen-chao (TPE)				0	10	14
15	Nandra Eko Wahyudi (INA)				0	11	12
16	Manjeet Singh (IND)				0	13	10
17	Tarek Al-Moakee (SYR)			20	−20	9	8
18	Yahiaaldien Khalefa (BRN)			20	−20	18	6

=== Elimination race ===
Rank	Athlete	Points
1	Eiya Hashimoto (JPN)	40
2	Shin Dong-in (KOR)	38
3	Artyom Zakharov (KAZ)	36
4	Mohammad Ganjkhanloo (IRI)	34
5	Leung Chun Wing (HKG)	32
6	Nandra Eko Wahyudi (INA)	30
7	Jiang Zhihui (CHN)	28
8	Li Wen-chao (TPE)	26
9	Nur Aiman Rosli (MAS)	24
10	Yousif Mirza (UAE)	22
11	Lao Long San (MAC)	20
12	Muradjan Khalmuratov (UZB)	18
13	Calvin Sim (SGP)	16
14	Yahiaaldien Khalefa (BRN)	14
15	Patompob Phonarjthan (THA)	12
16	Sainbayaryn Jambaljamts (MGL)	10
17	Tarek Al-Moakee (SYR)	8
18	Manjeet Singh (IND)	6

=== Points race ===
Rank	Athlete	Sprint										Laps		Total	Finish order
Rank	Athlete	1	2	3	4	5	6	7	8	9	10	+	−	Total	Finish order
1	Patompob Phonarjthan (THA)	5	5			1			2		4			17	3
2	Jiang Zhihui (CHN)		2	1	1		1			5	6			16	2
3	Eiya Hashimoto (JPN)		1	2	2		5	5						15	5
4	Leung Chun Wing (HKG)			5	5			1		1	2			14	4
5	Artyom Zakharov (KAZ)	1		3	3	3	2							12	13
6	Mohammad Ganjkhanloo (IRI)										10			10	1
7	Yousif Mirza (UAE)								5	3				8	14
8	Nur Aiman Rosli (MAS)								3	2				5	8
9	Sainbayaryn Jambaljamts (MGL)					5								5	10
10	Nandra Eko Wahyudi (INA)		3						1					4	9
11	Lao Long San (MAC)	2						2						4	12
12	Muradjan Khalmuratov (UZB)							3						3	6
13	Shin Dong-in (KOR)						3							3	7
14	Calvin Sim (SGP)													0	11
15	Tarek Al-Moakee (SYR)	3											20	−17	
16	Li Wen-chao (TPE)					2							20	−18	15
—	Yahiaaldien Khalefa (BRN)												20	DNF	
—	Manjeet Singh (IND)												20	DNF	

=== Summary ===
Rank	Athlete	Scratch race	Tempo race	Elim. race	Points race	Total
1st place, gold medalist(s)	Eiya Hashimoto (JPN)	26	38	40	15	119
2nd place, silver medalist(s)	Leung Chun Wing (HKG)	28	40	32	14	114
3rd place, bronze medalist(s)	Artyom Zakharov (KAZ)	30	34	36	12	112
4	Mohammad Ganjkhanloo (IRI)	40	24	34	10	108
5	Jiang Zhihui (CHN)	22	36	28	16	102
6	Shin Dong-in (KOR)	24	32	38	3	97
7	Lao Long San (MAC)	38	22	20	4	84
8	Muradjan Khalmuratov (UZB)	32	30	18	3	83
9	Sainbayaryn Jambaljamts (MGL)	36	28	10	5	79
10	Yousif Mirza (UAE)	18	26	22	8	74
11	Nur Aiman Rosli (MAS)	20	16	24	5	65
12	Patompob Phonarjthan (THA)	16	18	12	17	63
13	Li Wen-chao (TPE)	34	14	26	−18	56
14	Nandra Eko Wahyudi (INA)	8	12	30	4	54
15	Calvin Sim (SGP)	14	20	16	0	50
16	Tarek Al-Moakee (SYR)	12	8	8	−17	11
—	Yahiaaldien Khalefa (BRN)	6	6	14	DNF	DNF
—	Manjeet Singh (IND)	10	10	6	DNF	DNF
