= Jang Kyung-gu =

South Korean cyclist

Personal information
- Born: 29 May 1990 (age 36)

Korean name
- Hangul: 장경구
- RR: Jang Gyeonggu
- MR: Chang Kyŏnggu

Sport
- Country: South Korea
- Sport: Road bicycle racing
- Cycling career
- Sport: Cycling
- Disciplines: Road; Track
- Role: Rider

Professional teams
- 2009: Seoul Cycling Team
- 2012: Arbö–Gebrüder Weiss–Oberndorfer
- 2014–2016: Korail Cycling Team
Medal record
Representing South Korea
Asian Games
| Gold medal – first place | 2014 Incheon | Men's road race |

Jang Kyung-gu (born 19 May 1990) is a South Korean road bicycle racer. He competed in the road race competition of 2010 and 2014 Asian Games, finishing 13th and first respectively. He is the first Korean athlete to win a gold medal in the cycling road race since Kim Yong-mi in the women's road race at the 2002 Asian Games.

== Major results ==
2010
2nd Overall Tour de Seoul
7th Overall Tour de Korea

1st Stage 7

2011
1st Overall Tour de Hokkaido
4th Road race, Asian Road Championships
2012
4th Overall Tour de Korea

1st Young rider classification

Asian Road Championships

8th Road race
8th Time trial

2014
1st Road race, Asian Games
Tour de Korea

1st Mountains classification
1st Stage 6

5th Road race, Asian Road Championships
2015
1st Time trial, National Road Championships
1st Mountains classification Tour de Korea
2016
1st Stage 6 Tour de Singkarak
3rd Time trial, National Road Championships
2017
1st Road race, National Road Championships
2018
2nd Time trial, National Road Championships
6th Road race, Asian Games
2021
1st Road race, National Road Championships
2022
5th Time trial, National Road Championships
2023
Tour of Thailand

1st Stage 5
1st Mountains classification
