= Cycling at the 2022 Asian Games – Men's madison =

Men's madison at the 2022 Asian Games
- Venue: Chun'an Jieshou Sports Centre Velodrome
- Dates: 29 September 2023
- Competitors: 22 from 11 nations

Medalists
gold medal	Naoki Kojima; Shunsuke Imamura	Japan
silver medal	Shin Dong-in; Kim Eu-ro	South Korea
bronze medal	Artyom Zakharov; Ramis Dinmukhametov	Kazakhstan

The men's madison event at the 2022 Asian Games was held on 29 September 2023 at Chun'an Jieshou Sports Centre Velodrome in Chun'an.

The Madison is a race where each team aims to complete more laps than any of the other teams. Riders in each team take turns during the race, handing over to another team member, resting, and then returning to the race. Teams are of two riders. Only one rider of the team is racing at any time, and the replacement rider has to be touched before taking over. The touch can also be a push, often on the shorts, or one rider hurling the other into the race by a hand-sling. How long each rider stays in the race is for the members of each team to decide.

The distance is 200 laps (50 kilometres). Teams score points in two ways: lapping the field and sprints. A team that gains a lap on the field earns 20 points; one that loses a lap has 20 points deducted. Every 10th lap is a sprint, with the first to finish the lap earning five points, second three points, third two points, and fourth one point. The points values are doubled for the final sprint. There is only one round of competition, It is a tag team points race that involves all teams competing at once without a preliminary round to reduce the number of teams.

The Madison was an Asian Games event for men in 2002 and 2006, but was dropped ahead of the 2010 Guangzhou Asian Games. In June 2017, the International Olympic Committee announced that the Madison would be added to the Olympic programme for the 2020 Summer Olympics. The 2020 Games includes a relaunch of the men's Madison event, as well as the introduction of the women's Madison as an Olympic event for the first time. Therefore, the madison event also got included to the Asian Games programme from the 2018 Games in Indonesia.

A total of eleven teams participated in the competition but four of them, India, Uzbekistan, Thailand and Macau failed to finish the race after falling two laps behind. The Japanese team of Naoki Kojima and Shunsuke Imamura won the gold medal with 24 points ahead of Shin Dong-in and Kim Eu-ro from South Korea, as both teams tied on points the gold medal went to Japan for finishing better in the last sprint.

Artyom Zakharov and Ramis Dinmukhametov from Kazakhstan beat the defending champion from Hong Kong to win the bronze medal by collecting 37 points.

== Schedule ==
All times are China Standard Time (UTC+08:00)

Date	Time	Event
Friday, 29 September 2023	18:44	Final

== Results ==
Legend

- DNF — Did not finish

Rank	Team	Sprint																				Laps		Total	Finish order
Rank	Team	1	2	3	4	5	6	7	8	9	10	11	12	13	14	15	16	17	18	19	20	+	−	Total	Finish order
1st place, gold medalist(s)	Japan (JPN); Naoki Kojima; Shunsuke Imamura			3	5		5		3	3	3	1	5	3	3	3	3		1	3	10			54	1
2nd place, silver medalist(s)	South Korea (KOR); Shin Dong-in; Kim Eu-ro	2		1		5		2	5	5		5	1		5	5	5	2		5	6			54	2
3rd place, bronze medalist(s)	Kazakhstan (KAZ); Artyom Zakharov; Ramis Dinmukhametov			5	3			3	1	1	1	3	3	1	2	1	1	5	2	1	4			37	3
4	Hong Kong (HKG); Leung Chun Wing; Leung Ka Yu	3	3		2	2	3	5		2				5	1			3			2			31	4
5	China (CHN); Sun Wentao; Wu Junjie					1	2		2		5	2		2		2	2		3					21	5
6	Indonesia (INA); Bernard Van Aert; Terry Yudha Kusuma		2	2	1		1	1										1	5	2				15	7
7	Malaysia (MAS); Yusri Shaari; Abdul Azim Aliyas										2													2	6
8	India (IND); Niraj Kumar; Harshveer Sekhon		5										2										40	DNF	
9	Uzbekistan (UZB); Dmitriy Bocharov; Nikita Tsvetkov	1	1			3																	40	DNF	
10	Thailand (THA); Yuttana Mano; Thak Kaeonoi	5																					40	DNF	
11	Macau (MAC); Lao Long San; Kok Mun Wa																						40	DNF	
