= LX Cycling Team =

South Korean cycling team

Team information
- UCI code: LXC
- Registered: South Korea
- Founded: 2016
- Discipline: Road
- Status: UCI Continental (2016– )

Key personnel
- General manager: Jang Yun-ho
- Team manager: Jang Sun-jae

Team name history
- 2016 2017–: LX–IIBS Cycling Team; LX Cycling Team

LX Cycling Team is a South Korean UCI Continental road cycling team founded in 2016.

== Team roster ==
As of 19 February 2021.

Rider	Date of birth
Hwang Yong-woo (KOR)	23 July 2002 (age 24)
Im Jun-hyeong (KOR)	18 March 2000 (age 26)
Jung Ha-jeon (KOR)	30 April 1995 (age 31)
Kim Eu-ro (KOR)	7 October 1999 (age 26)
Kim Jin-woong (KOR)	7 December 2002 (age 23)

Rider	Date of birth
Lee Si-hoon (KOR)	14 February 2001 (age 25)
Park Ji-hwan (KOR)	4 September 2002 (age 24)
Park Keon-woo (KOR)	18 July 1991 (age 35)
Park Sang-hong (KOR)	29 March 1989 (age 37)
Son Dong-kyun (KOR)	28 January 2000 (age 26)

== Major wins ==
2016
Stage 1 International Tour de Banyuwangi Ijen, Dong Hyun Shin

2019
Stage 2 The Princess Maha Chakri Sirindhorn's Cup, Park Sang-hoon
