= Youm Jung-hwan =

South Korean bicycle racer

Personal information
- Full name: Youm Jung-hwan
- Born: 1 December 1985 South Korea
- Died: 18 February 2014 (aged 28)

Cycling career
- Sport: Cycling
- Discipline: Road
- Role: Rider
- Rider type: Time trialist

Professional teams
- 2010–2012: Seoul Cycling Team
- 2013: Geumsan Insam Cello
- 2014: KSPO

Youm Jung-hwan (1 December 1985 – 18 February 2014) was a South Korean cyclist. He died at the age of 28 from a heart attack.

== Major results ==
2005
1st Time trial, Asian Cycling Championships
2007
1st Time trial, National Road Championships
2008
1st Time trial, National Road Championships
2011
National Road Championships

2nd Time trial
3rd Road race

2012
1st Time trial, National Road Championships
