= Park Sang-hong =

South Korean bicycle racer

Personal information
- Born: 29 March 1989 (age 37) South Korea

Korean name
- Hangul: 박상홍
- RR: Bak Sanghong
- MR: Pak Sanghong

Sport
- Cycling career
- Full name: Park Sang-hong
- Sport: Cycling
- Current team: LX Cycling Team
- Discipline: Road
- Role: Rider

Professional teams
- 2015: RTS–Santic Racing Team
- 2016–: LX–IIBS Cycling Team

Park Sang-hong (Korean: 박상홍; born March 29, 1989) is a South Korean cyclist, who currently rides for UCI Continental team LX Cycling Team.

== Major results ==
2015
1st Road race, National Road Championships
2016
4th Road race, Asian Road Championships
5th Road race, National Road Championships
2017
1st Road race, Asian Road Championships
Tour de Filipinas

1st Points classification
1st Stage 4

5th Overall Tour de Molvccas
2019
2nd Team time trial, Asian Road Championships
8th Overall Tour de Tochigi
2020
1st Road race, National Road Championships
3rd Team pursuit, National Track Championships
2021
8th Overall Tour of Thailand
2022
4th Road race, National Road Championships
