= Naoki Kojima =

Japanese cyclist (born 2000)

Personal information
- Born: 1 November 2000 (age 26)

Cycling career
- Sport: Cycling
- Current team: Team Bridgestone Cycling
- Disciplines: Track; Road
- Role: Rider

Professional team
- 2021–: Team Bridgestone Cycling
Medal record
Men's track cycling
Representing Japan
Asian Games
| Gold medal – first place | 2022 Hangzhou | Team pursuit |
| Gold medal – first place | 2022 Hangzhou | Madison |
| Gold medal – first place | 2026 Aichi–Nagoya | Madison |
| Silver medal – second place | 2026 Aichi–Nagoya | Team pursuit |
Asian Championships
| Gold medal – first place | 2022 New Delhi | Team pursuit |
| Gold medal – first place | 2023 Nilai | Points race |
| Gold medal – first place | 2023 Nilai | Team pursuit |
| Gold medal – first place | 2024 New Delhi | Team pursuit |
| Gold medal – first place | 2024 New Delhi | Points race |
| Gold medal – first place | 2025 Nilai | Omnium |
| Silver medal – second place | 2025 Nilai | Team pursuit |
| Bronze medal – third place | 2022 New Delhi | Points race |

Naoki Kojima (兒島 直樹, Kojima Naoki; born 1 November 2000) is a Japanese track and road cyclist, who currently rides for UCI Continental team Team Bridgestone Cycling.

He began track cycling in middle school, and attended Nihon University until 2022. He won two gold medals at the 2022 Asian Games, in addition to multiple titles at the national and Asian championships. He also competes in road racing, taking his first pro win on the opening stage of the 2023 Tour de Kyushu.

== Major results ==
=== Track ===
2021
3rd Team pursuit, Hong Kong, UCI Nations Cup
2024
UCI Nations Cup

2nd Team pursuit, Hong Kong
3rd Omnium, Hong Kong

=== Road ===
2018
3rd Road race, National Junior Championships
2021
1st Road race, National Under-23 Championships
2023 (1 pro win)
Tour de Kyushu

1st Points classification
1st Stage 1
