= Shi Tao (cyclist) =

Chinese bicycle racer

Personal information
- Full name: Shi Tao
- Born: 1 April 1992 (age 34)

Cycling career
- Sport: Cycling
- Current team: Retired
- Disciplines: Track; Road
- Role: Rider
- Rider type: Pursuitist (track)

Professional teams
- 2013: China Hainan Yindongli
- 2014: Giant–Champion System
- 2016: Team Lvshan Landscape
Medal record
Representing China
Men's cycling
Asian Games
| Gold medal – first place | 2014 Incheon | Team pursuit |

Shi Tao (born 1 April 1992) is a Chinese former road and track cyclist. He competed in the team pursuit event at the 2013 UCI Track Cycling World Championships.
