= Eiya Hashimoto =

Japanese cyclist (born 1993)

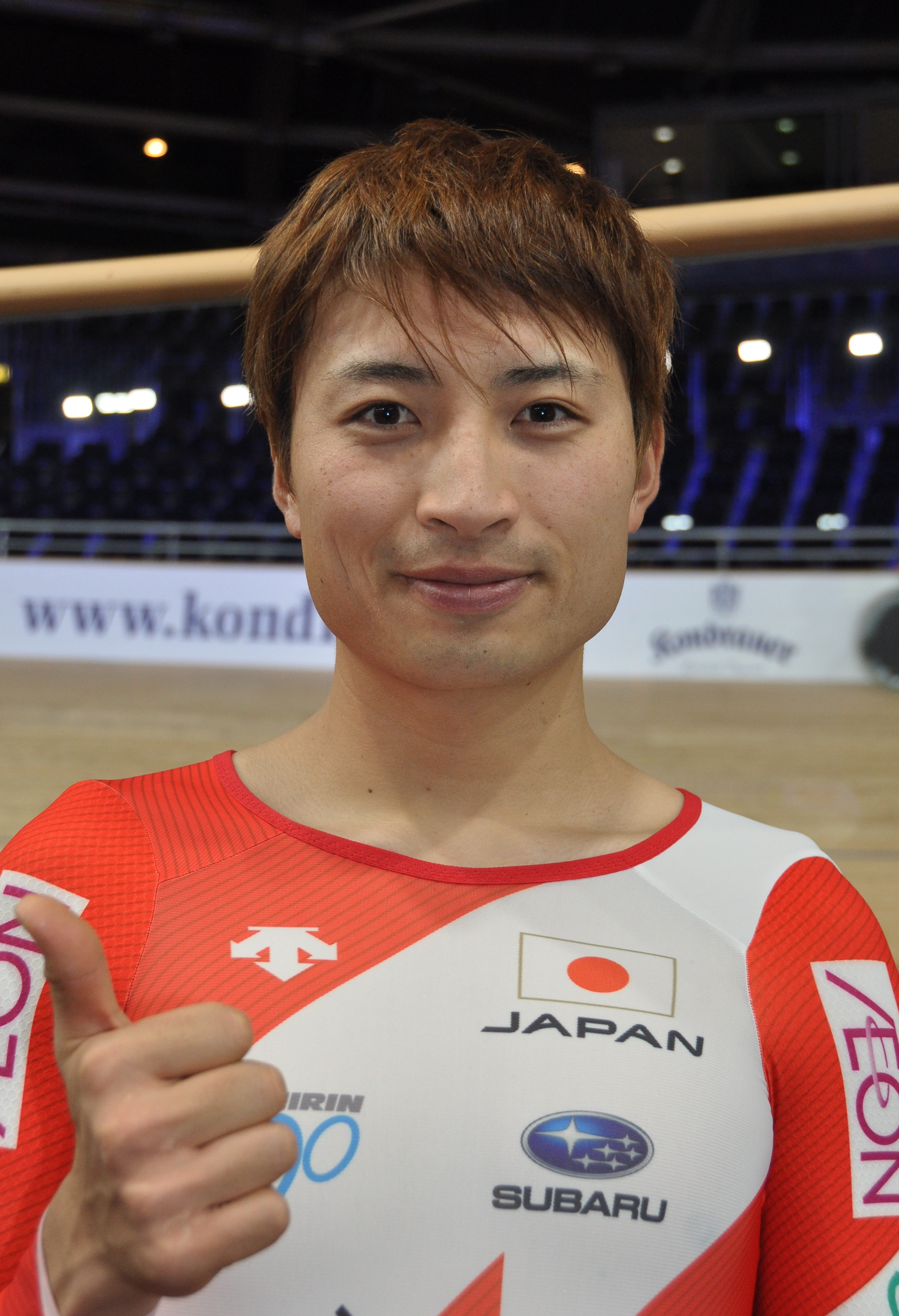
- Hashimoto at the 2020 UCI Track Cycling World Championships

Personal information
- Full name: Eiya Hashimoto; Japanese: 橋本 英也
- Born: 15 December 1993 (age 32) Gifu, Japan

Cycling career
- Sport: Cycling
- Current team: Team Bridgestone Cycling
- Disciplines: Road; Track
- Role: Rider

Amateur teams
- 2012–2015: NIFS Kanoya
- 2016–2017: Nippo

Professional team
- 2018–: Team Bridgestone Cycling
Medal record
Representing Japan
Men's cycling
Asian Games
Gold medal – first place	2014 Incheon	Omnium
Gold medal – first place	2018 Jakarta-Palembang	Omnium
Gold medal – first place	2022 Hangzhou	Team pursuit
Bronze medal – third place	2014 Incheon	Team pursuit
Bronze medal – third place	2018 Jakarta-Palembang	Madison
Bronze medal – third place	2018 Jakarta-Palembang	Team pursuit
Asian Championships
Gold medal – first place	2016 Izu	Omnium
Gold medal – first place	2018 Nilai	Omnium
Gold medal – first place	2019 Jakarta	Omnium
Gold medal – first place	2020 Jincheon	Omnium
Gold medal – first place	2020 Jincheon	Madison
Gold medal – first place	2020 Jincheon	Team pursuit
Gold medal – first place	2022 New Delhi	Scratch
Gold medal – first place	2022 New Delhi	Team pursuit
Gold medal – first place	2023 Nilai	Elimination
Gold medal – first place	2023 Nilai	Omnium
Gold medal – first place	2023 Nilai	Team pursuit
Gold medal – first place	2024 New Delhi	Omnium
Gold medal – first place	2024 New Delhi	Team pursuit
Gold medal – first place	2025 Nilai	Elimination
Gold medal – first place	2025 Nilai	Madison
Gold medal – first place	2026 Tagaytay	Elimination
Gold medal – first place	2026 Tagaytay	Madison
Silver medal – second place	2013 New Delhi	Team pursuit
Silver medal – second place	2014 Astana	Omnium
Silver medal – second place	2019 Jakarta	Team pursuit
Silver medal – second place	2025 Nilai	Team pursuit
Silver medal – second place	2026 Tagaytay	Team pursuit
Bronze medal – third place	2019 Jakarta	Madison

Eiya Hashimoto (橋本 英也, Hashimoto Eiya; born 15 December 1993) is a Japanese road and track cyclist, who currently rides for UCI Continental team Team Bridgestone Cycling. He won the gold medal at the 2014 Asian Games in the Men's Omnium.

He qualified to represent Japan at the 2020 Summer Olympics.

== Major results ==
=== Track ===
2012
National Championships

1st Individual pursuit
1st Team pursuit

2013
National Championships

1st Omnium
1st Individual pursuit

2nd Team pursuit, Asian Championships
2nd Individual pursuit, East Asian Games
2014
Asian Games

1st Omnium
3rd Team pursuit

National Championships

1st Points race
1st Individual pursuit
1st Madison (with Hiroaki Harada)
1st Team pursuit

2nd Omnium, Asian Championships
2016
1st Omnium, Asian Championships
2017
1st Omnium, National Championships
2nd Omnium, UCI World Cup, Santiago
2018
1st Omnium, Asian Championships
Asian Games

1st Omnium
3rd Team pursuit
3rd Madison (with Shunsuke Imamura)

2019
Asian Championships

1st Omnium
2nd Team pursuit
3rd Madison (with Kazushige Kuboki)

National Championships

1st Omnium
1st Scratch
1st Team pursuit
1st Madison (with Kazushige Kuboki)
3rd Individual pursuit

3rd Omnium, UCI World Cup, Brisbane
2020
Asian Championships

1st Omnium
1st Team pursuit
2nd Madison (with Kazushige Kuboki)

National Championships

1st Points race
1st Omnium
1st Team pursuit

2021
National Championships

1st Team pursuit
2nd Scratch
2nd Elimination race
2nd Madison
3rd Omnium

UCI Nations Cup, Hong Kong

1st Omnium
1st Elimination
3rd Madison (with Shunsuke Imamura)
3rd Team pursuit

2022
Asian Championships

1st Scratch
1st Team pursuit

National Championships

1st Elimination race
2nd Madison
2nd Team pursuit
3rd Individual pursuit
3rd Omnium

=== Road ===
2013
2nd Time trial, National Under-23 Road Championships
