= Moosa Khalfan Said =

Qatari cyclist

Personal information
- Born: 4 April 1988 (age 38) Qatar

Cycling career
- Sport: Cycling
- Discipline: Road
- Role: Rider

Professional team
- 2007-2009: Doha Team

Moosa Khalfan Said (born 4 April 1988) is a Qatari cyclist.

== Palmares ==
2006
(Qatar) National Road Race Champion
