= Shen Ping'an =

Chinese cyclist

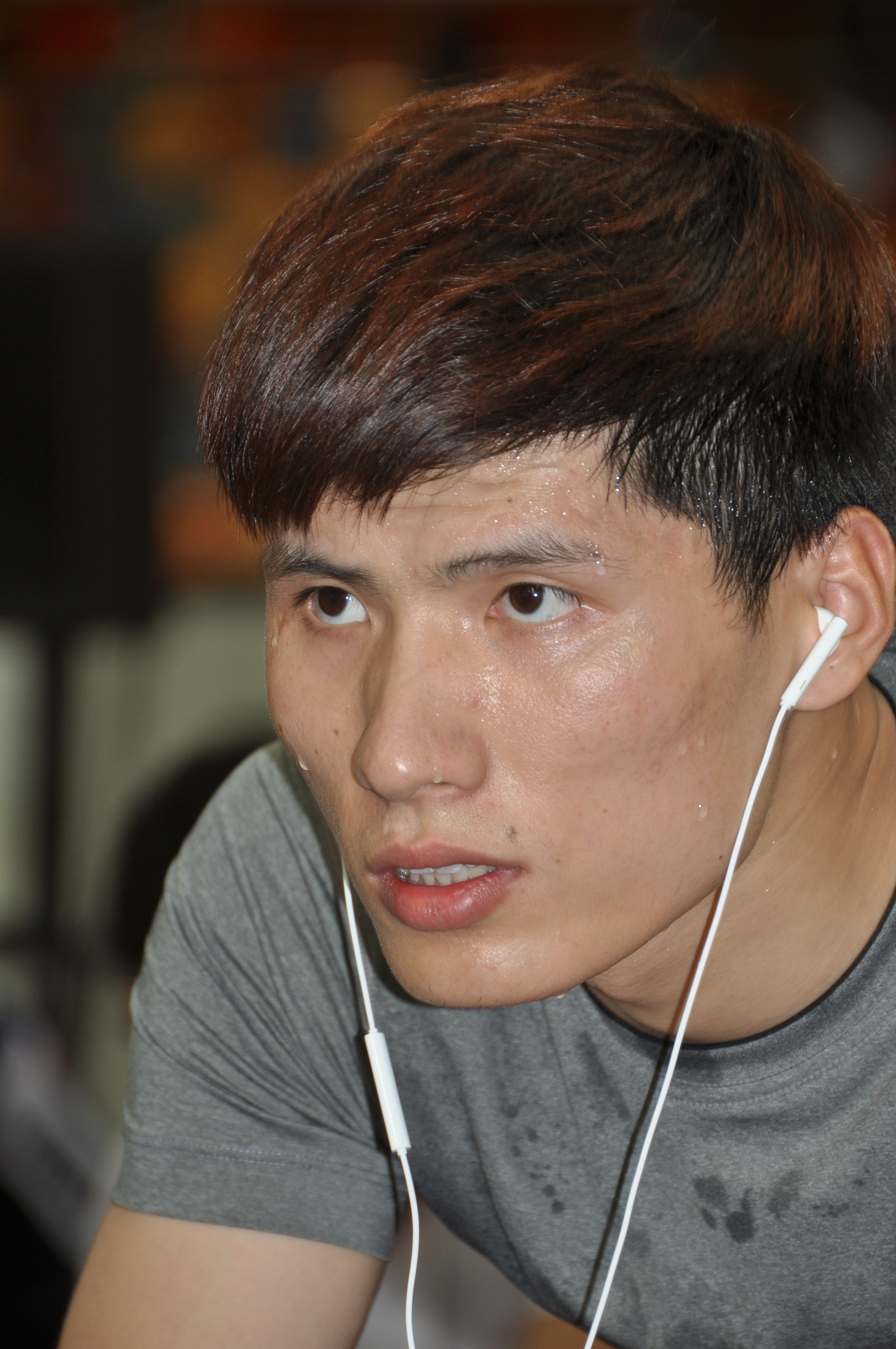
- Shen in 2018

Personal information
- Born: 20 April 1994 (age 32)

Cycling career
- Sport: Cycling
- Discipline: Track
- Role: Rider

Professional team
- 2014–2016: Giant–Champion System
Medal record
Representing China
Men's track cycling
Asian Games
| Gold medal – first place | 2014 Incheon | Team pursuit |
| Gold medal – first place | 2018 Jakarta-Palembang | Team pursuit |
Asian Championships
| Gold medal – first place | 2014 Astana | Team pursuit |
| Gold medal – first place | 2015 Nakhon Ratchasima | Team pursuit |
| Gold medal – first place | 2016 Izu | Team pursuit |
| Silver medal – second place | 2019 Jakarta | Madison |
| Bronze medal – third place | 2018 Nilai | Team pursuit |

Shen Ping'an (Chinese: 沈平安; pinyin: Shěn Píng'ān, born 20 April 1994) is a Chinese professional racing cyclist. He rode at the 2015 UCI Track Cycling World Championships. He also competed at the 2014 Asian Games.
