= Shogo Ichimaru =

Japanese cyclist (born 1992)

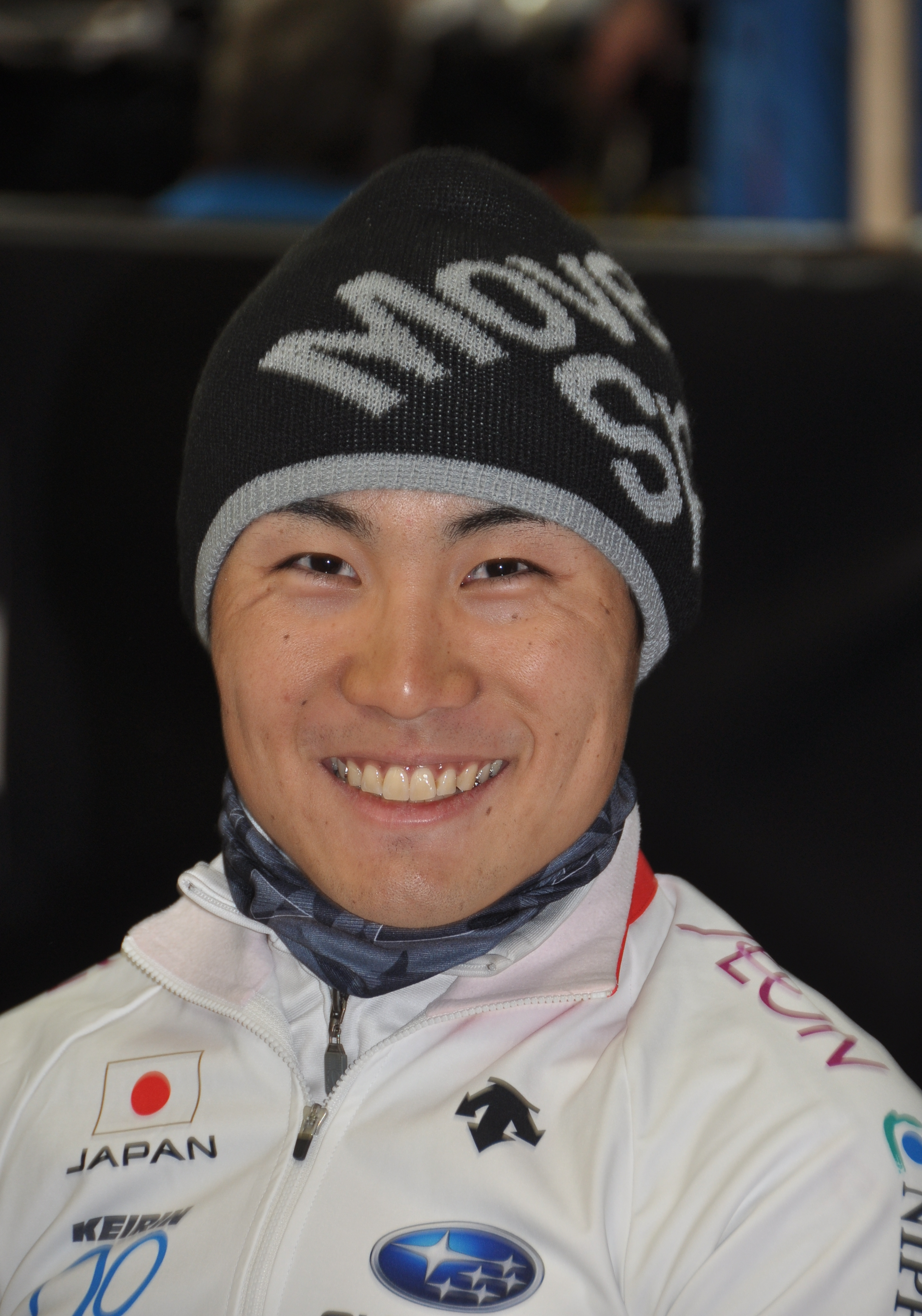
- Ichimaru at the 2018 UCI Track Cycling World Championships

Personal information
- Full name: Shogo Ichimaru; Japanese: 一丸 尚伍
- Born: 4 January 1992 (age 34)

Cycling career
- Sport: Cycling
- Current team: Shimano Racing Team
- Disciplines: Track; Road
- Role: Rider

Professional teams
- 2015–2018: Bridgestone–Anchor
- 2019–2021: Shimano Racing Team
Medal record
Representing Japan
Men's track cycling
Asian Games
Bronze medal – third place	2014 Incheon	Team pursuit
Bronze medal – third place	2018 Jakarta-Palembang	Team pursuit
Asian Championships
Gold medal – first place	2018 Nilai	Team pursuit
Silver medal – second place	2013 New Delhi	Team pursuit
Silver medal – second place	2015 Nakhon Ratchasima	Team pursuit
Silver medal – second place	2016 Izu	Team pursuit
Silver medal – second place	2019 Jakarta	Team pursuit

Shogo Ichimaru (一丸 尚伍, Ichimaru Shōgo; born 4 January 1992) is a Japanese road and track cyclist. For road racing, he lastly rode for UCI Continental team Shimano Racing Team. He won the silver medal in the team pursuit at the 2016 Asian Cycling Championships. Since 2022 he's a Keirin racer.
