= Robert Gaineyev =

Kazakhstani cyclist (born 1994)

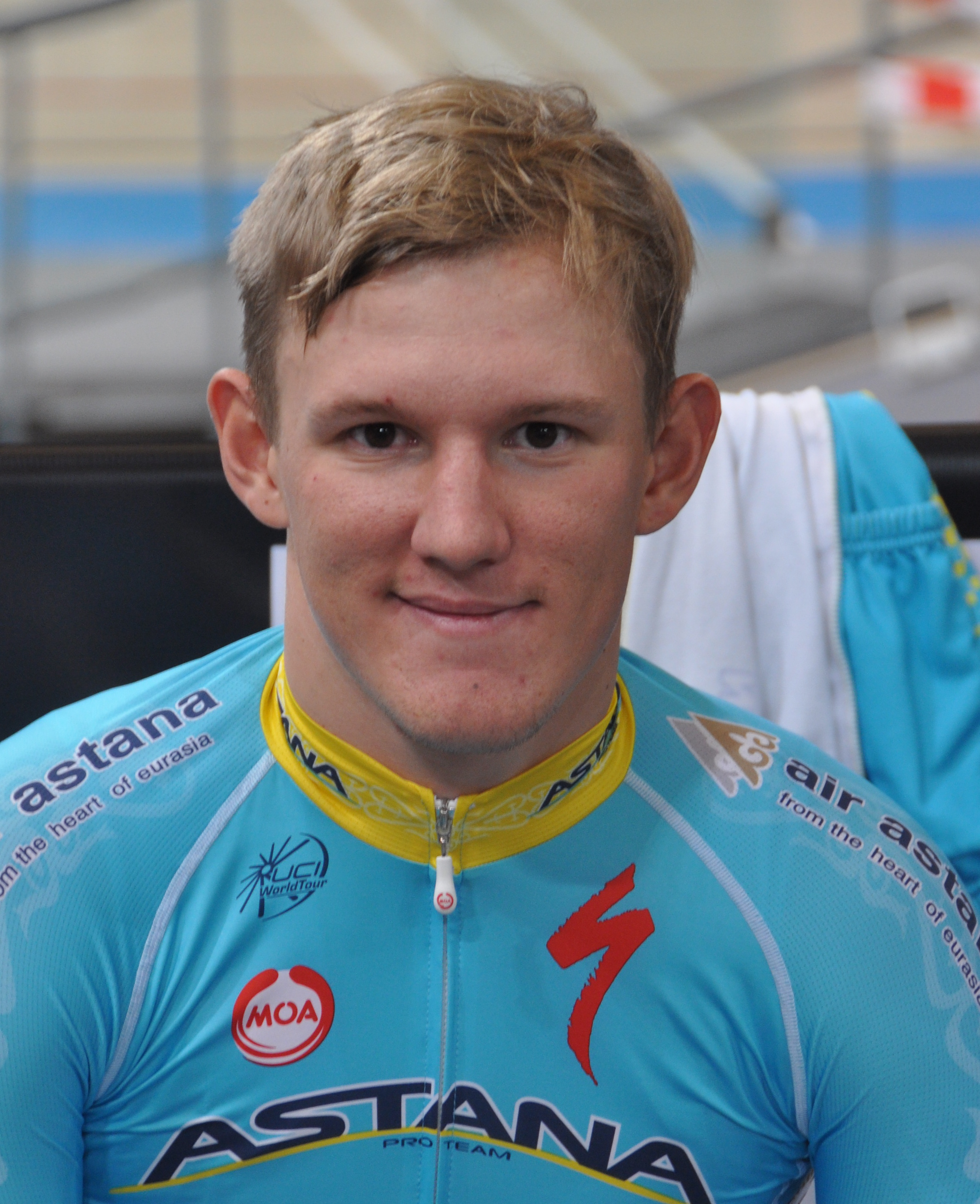
- Robert Gaineyev (2016)

Personal information
- Born: 28 June 1994 (age 32)

Cycling career
- Sport: Cycling
- Discipline: Track cycling
- Role: Rider
Medal record
Men's track cycling
Representing Kazakhstan
Asian Championships
Silver medal – second place	2016 Izu	Scratch
Bronze medal – third place	2016 Izu	Madison
Bronze medal – third place	2017 New Delhi	Scratch
Bronze medal – third place	2019 Jakarta	Team pursuit

Robert Gaineyev (born 28 June 1994) is a Kazakhstani male track cyclist. He won the silver medal in the scratch race and the bronze medal in the madison at the 2016 Asian Cycling Championships.
