= Min Kyeong-ho =

South Korean cyclist (born 1996)

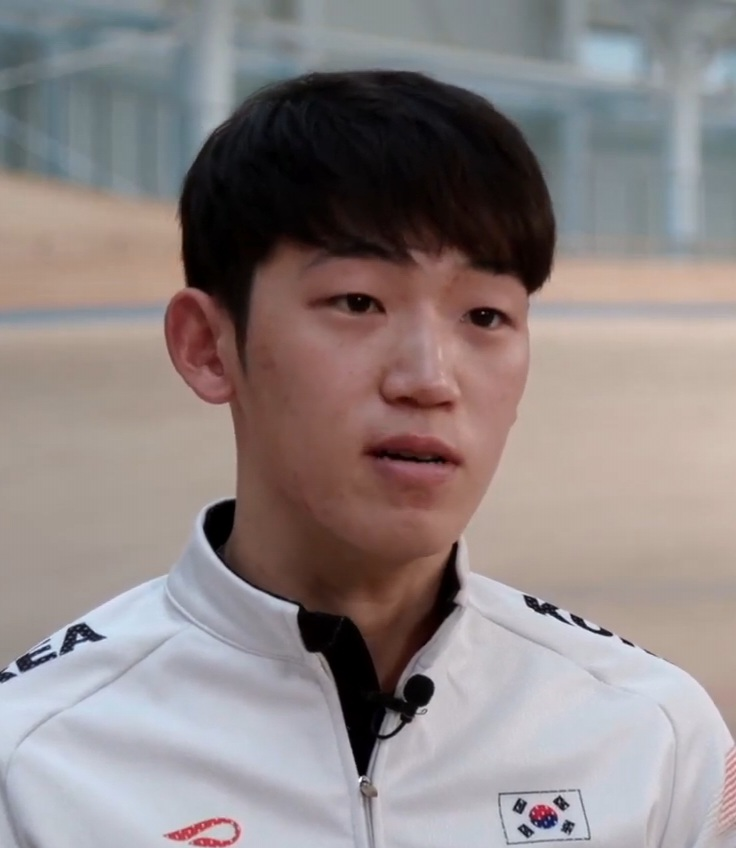

Personal information
- Full name: Min Kyeong-ho
- Born: 25 July 1996 (age 30)

Cycling career
- Sport: Cycling
- Current team: Seoul Cycling Team
- Disciplines: Track; Road
- Role: Puncheur

Professional team
- 2016–: Seoul Cycling Team
Medal record
Representing South Korea
Men's track cycling
Asian Games
Bronze medal – third place	2022 Hangzhou	Team pursuit
Bronze medal – third place	2026 Aichi–Nagoya	Team pursuit
Asian Championships
Gold medal – first place	2016 Izu	Points race
Gold medal – first place	2019 Jakarta	Individual pursuit
Gold medal – first place	2019 Jakarta	Team pursuit
Gold medal – first place	2025 Nilai	Team pursuit
Silver medal – second place	2017 New Delhi	Team pursuit
Silver medal – second place	2018 Nilai	Individual pursuit
Silver medal – second place	2018 Nilai	Team pursuit
Silver medal – second place	2020 Jincheon	Team pursuit
Silver medal – second place	2022 New Delhi	Madison
Silver medal – second place	2022 New Delhi	Team pursuit
Silver medal – second place	2026 Tagaytay	Individual pursuit
Bronze medal – third place	2016 Izu	Individual pursuit
Bronze medal – third place	2016 Izu	Team pursuit
Bronze medal – third place	2020 Jincheon	Individual pursuit
Bronze medal – third place	2025 Nilai	Individual pursuit
Bronze medal – third place	2026 Tagaytay	Points race
Bronze medal – third place	2026 Tagaytay	Team pursuit

Min Kyeong-ho (born 25 July 1996) is a South Korean track and road cyclist, who currently rides for UCI Continental team Seoul Cycling Team. At the 2016 Asian Cycling Championships he won the gold medal in the points race, the bronze medal in the individual pursuit and the bronze medal in the team pursuit. In 2017, he also had success on the road, winning the Tour de Korea, a 2.1 event on the UCI Asia Tour. He also competed at the 2019 UCI Track Cycling World Championships.

== Major results ==
2017
1st Overall Tour de Korea

1st Stage 2

2019
2nd Time trial, National Road Championships
10th Overall Tour de Korea
