= Xue Chaohua =

Chinese bicycle racer

Personal information
- Full name: Xue Chaohua
- Born: 31 March 1992 (age 34) Beijing, China

Cycling career
- Sport: Cycling
- Current team: Ningxia Sports Lottery Continental Team
- Disciplines: Track; Road
- Role: Rider

Professional teams
- 2013–2016: Max Success Sports
- 2017: Mitchelton Scott
- 2020–: Ningxia Sports Lottery Continental Team
Medal record
Representing China
Men's track cycling
Asian Championships
Gold medal – first place	2016 Izu	team pursuit

Xue Chaohua (simplified Chinese: 薛超华; traditional Chinese: 薛超華; pinyin: Xuē Chāohuá; born 31 March 1992) is a Chinese road and track cyclist, who currently rides for UCI Continental team Ningxia Sports Lottery Continental Team. He won the gold medal in the team pursuit at the 2016 Asian Cycling Championships.

== Major results ==
2019
1st Road race, National Road Championships
