= Artyom Zakharov =

Kazakh cyclist

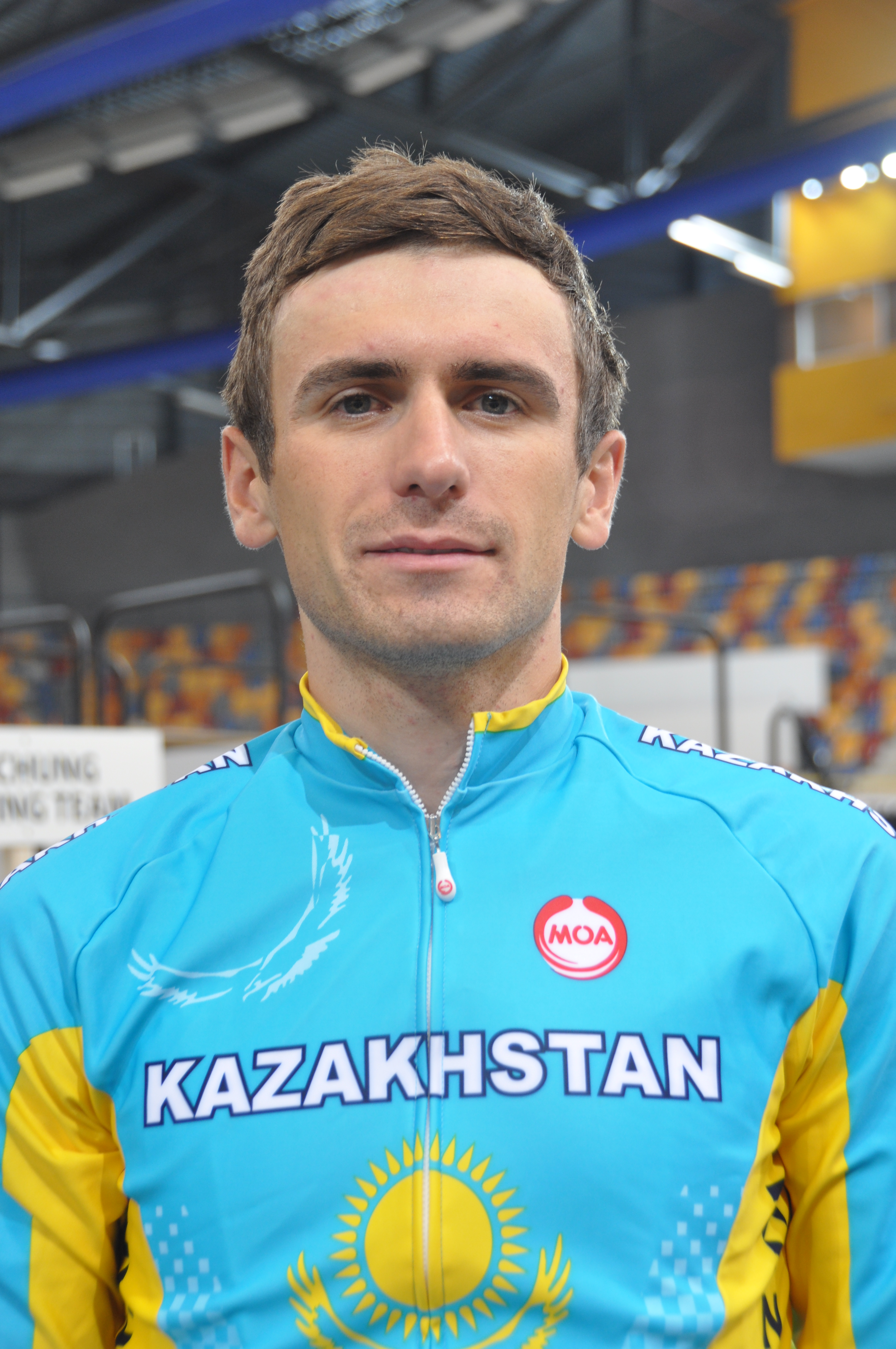
- Zakharov in 2016

Personal information
- Born: 27 October 1991 (age 34) Petropavlovsk, Kazakh SSR, Soviet Union
- Height: 180 cm (5 ft 11 in)
- Weight: 70 kg (154 lb)

Cycling career
- Sport: Cycling
- Current team: XDS Astana Development Team
- Disciplines: Road; Track
- Role: Rider

Professional teams
- 2014: Vino 4ever
- 2015: Seven Rivers Cycling Team
- 2016–2022: Astana
- 2023: Astana Qazaqstan Development Team

Major wins
- Single-day races and Classics National Road Race Championships (2017)
Medal record
Representing Kazakhstan
Men's track cycling
Asian Games
Bronze medal – third place	2018 Jakarta-Palembang	Individual pursuit
Bronze medal – third place	2018 Jakarta-Palembang	Omnium
Bronze medal – third place	2022 Hangzhou	Madison
Asian Championships
Gold medal – first place	2013 New Delhi	Omnium
Silver medal – second place	2012 Kuala Lumpur	Madison
Silver medal – second place	2016 Izu	Omnium
Silver medal – second place	2017 New Delhi	Individual pursuit
Silver medal – second place	2017 New Delhi	Madison
Silver medal – second place	2019 Jakarta	Points race
Silver medal – second place	2020 Jincheon	Omnium
Silver medal – second place	2023 Nilai	Omnium
Bronze medal – third place	2012 Kuala Lumpur	Team pursuit
Bronze medal – third place	2015 Nakhon Ratchasima	Omnium
Bronze medal – third place	2018 Nilai	Individual pursuit
Bronze medal – third place	2018 Nilai	Omnium
Bronze medal – third place	2019 Jakarta	Team pursuit
Bronze medal – third place	2020 Jincheon	Madison
Bronze medal – third place	2023 Nilai	Team pursuit
Islamic Solidarity Games
Gold medal – first place	2021 Konya	Omnium

Artyom Alekseyevich Zakharov (Russian: Артём Алексеевич Захаров, born 27 October 1991) is a Kazakhstani cyclist, who last rode for UCI Continental team XDS Astana Development Team.

== Professional career ==
He competed at the 2012 UCI Track Cycling World Championships and 2013 UCI Track Cycling World Championships. He has also won numerous medals at the Asian Track Championships.

== Major results ==
=== Track ===
2012
Asian Track Championships

2nd Madison
3rd Team pursuit

2013
1st Omnium, Asian Track Championships
3rd Omnium, 2013–14 UCI Track Cycling World Cup, Aguascalientes
2015
3rd Omnium, Asian Track Championships
2016
2nd Omnium, Asian Track Championships
3rd Omnium, 2015–16 UCI Track Cycling World Cup, Hong Kong
2017
Asian Indoor and Martial Arts Games

1st Team pursuit
2nd Omnium

Asian Track Championships

2nd Individual pursuit
2nd Omnium

2018
Asian Games

3rd Individual pursuit
3rd Omnium

Asian Track Championships

3rd Individual pursuit
3rd Omnium

2019
Asian Track Championships

2nd Points race
3rd Team pursuit

3rd Omnium, 2019–20 UCI Track Cycling World Cup, Cambridge
2020
Asian Track Championships

2nd Omnium
3rd Madison

=== Road ===
2012
5th Overall Tour of Vietnam
2013
8th Overall Tour de Serbie
2015
5th Time trial, National Road Championships
7th Grand Prix des Marbriers
10th Maykop–Ulyap–Maykop
2016
5th Time trial, National Road Championships
2017
National Road Championships

1st Road race
3rd Time trial

2018
3rd Road race, National Road Championships
2019
1st Team time trial, Asian Road Championships
5th Road race, National Road Championships
2021
4th Time trial, National Road Championships
2022
2nd Road race, National Road Championships
