= 2026 Asian Track Cycling Championships =

Bicycle competition in Tagaytay, Philippines

- Venue: Tagaytay, Philippines
- Date: 25–31 March
- Velodrome: Tagaytay City Velodrome
- Coordinates: 14°05′54.7″N 120°56′22.8″E
- Nations participating: 16
- Cyclists participating: 189

The 2026 Asian Track Cycling Championships was the 45th edition of the Asian Track Cycling Championships, which took place in Tagaytay, Philippines from 25 to 31 March 2026.

The Tagaytay City Velodrome was built in 2025 ahead of the event. The Philippines last hosted at the tournament in 1995 at the now demolished Amoranto Sports Complex velodrome in Quezon City.

== Venue ==
Tagaytay
Tagaytay City Velodrome	Tagaytay City Velodrome (Luzon)
Capacity: ~3,000	Tagaytay City Velodrome (Luzon)

== Participating nations ==
The following nations entered cyclists. Iran, Qatar and Mongolia withdrew, with the former two due to the 2026 Iran war.

- China
- Chinese Taipei
- Hong Kong
- Indonesia
- India
- Japan
- Kazakhstan
- Macau
- Malaysia
- Philippines (hosts)
- Saudi Arabia
- Singapore
- South Korea
- Thailand
- United Arab Emirates
- Uzbekistan

== Medal summary ==
=== Men ===
Event	Gold	Silver	Bronze
Sprint	Kaiya Ota; Japan	Li Zhiwei; China	Minato Nakaishi; Japan
1 km time trial	Kirill Kurdidi; Kazakhstan	Xie Han; China	Ryuto Ichida; Japan
Keirin	Xie Han; China	Li Zhiwei; China	Kang Shih-feng; Chinese Taipei
Individual pursuit	Pei Zhengyu; China	Min Kyeong-ho; South Korea	Tu Chih-hao; Chinese Taipei
Points race	Kanta Umezawa; Japan	Alisher Zhumakan; Kazakhstan	Min Kyeong-ho; South Korea
Scratch	Sun Haijiao; China	Alisher Zhumakan; Kazakhstan	Chu Tsun Wai; Hong Kong
Elimination	Eiya Hashimoto; Japan	Wu Junjie; China	Nikita Tsvetkov; Uzbekistan
Omnium	Wu Junjie; China	Li Jing-feng; Chinese Taipei	Tetsuo Yamamoto; Japan
Madison	Japan; Eiya Hashimoto; Kazushige Kuboki	Kazakhstan; Ramis Dinmukhametov; Ilya Karabutov	Hong Kong; Chu Tsun Wai; Tso Kai Kwong
Team sprint	China; Jin Zhiheng; Li Zhiwei; Huang Ruiting; Xie Han	Japan; Yoshitaku Nagasako; Kaiya Ota; Minato Nakaishi; Shinji Nakano	Hong Kong; Mok Tsz Chun; To Cheuk Hei; Yung Tsun Ho
Team pursuit	China; Wu Junjie; Yang Yang; Sun Wentao; Pei Zhengyu; Sun Haijiao	Japan; Kanta Umezawa; Eiya Hashimoto; Kazushige Kuboki; Shoki Kawano; Tetsuo Yamamoto	South Korea; Jang Hun; Kim Hyeon-seok; Min Kyeong-ho; Hong Seung-min; Lee Jin-gu

=== Women ===
Event	Gold	Silver	Bronze
Sprint	Yuan Liying; China	Mina Sato; Japan	Wang Lijuan; China
1 km time trial	Luo Xuehuang; China	Nurul Izzah Izzati Mohd Asri; Malaysia	Hwang Hyeon-seo; South Korea
Keirin	Yuan Liying; China	Wang Lijuan; China	Haruka Nakazawa; Japan
Individual pursuit	Wei Suwan; China	Tsuyaka Uchino; Japan	Rinata Sultanova; Kazakhstan
Points race	Nafosat Kozieva; Uzbekistan	Elizabeth Liau; Singapore	Leung Wing Yee; Hong Kong
Scratch	Lee Sze Wing; Hong Kong	Chen Ning; China	Tsuyaka Uchino; Japan
Elimination	Lee Sze Wing; Hong Kong	Chen Ning; China	Misaki Okamoto; Japan
Omnium	Chen Ning; China	Lee Sze Wing; Hong Kong	Shin Ji-eun; South Korea
Madison	Japan; Mizuki Ikeda; Maho Kakita	China; Gong Xianbing; Zhou Menghan	Hong Kong; Lee Sze Wing; Leung Wing Yee
Team sprint	China; Luo Xuehuang; Wang Lijuan; Yuan Liying; Tong Mengqi	Malaysia; Anis Amira Rosidi; Nurul Izzah Izzati Mohd Asri; Nur Alyssa Mohd Farid	South Korea; Kim Soo-hyun; Cho Sun-young; Kim Ha-eun
Team pursuit	China; Chen Ning; Gong Xianbing; Wang Xiaoyue; Wei Suwan; Yuan Haidi	Japan; Ayana Mizutani; Tsuyaka Uchino; Mizuki Ikeda; Maho Kakita; Misaki Okamoto	Hong Kong; Leung Wing Yee; Leung Bo Yee; Lee Sze Wing; Kwan Tsz Kwan; Guardiola Cheung

== Medal table ==
Rank	Nation	Gold	Silver	Bronze	Total
1	China	13	8	1	22
2	Japan	5	5	6	16
3	Hong Kong	2	1	6	9
4	Kazakhstan	1	3	1	5
5	Uzbekistan	1	0	1	2
6	Malaysia	0	2	0	2
7	South Korea	0	1	5	6
8	Chinese Taipei	0	1	2	3
9	Singapore	0	1	0	1
Totals (9 entries)		22	22	22	66
