= Tagaytay City Velodrome =

Velodrome in Cavite, Philippines

- Tagaytay CT Velodrome
- Velodrome facade in June 2025
- Interactive map of Tagaytay City Velodrome
- Location: Tagaytay, Philippines
- Coordinates: 14°05′54.7″N 120°56′22.8″E
- Capacity: ~3,000
- Type: Indoor velodrome
- Field size: 250 m (820 ft) (track)

Construction
- Opened: June 23, 2025

The Tagaytay City Velodrome (alternatively stylized as Tagaytay CT) is an indoor velodrome in Tagaytay, Cavite, Philippines.

== History ==
Plans to construct a new velodrome in either Tagaytay or New Clark City in Capas, Tarlac was proposed as early as 2019. The only other venue for track cyclist in the Philippines is the ageing velodrome within the Amoranto Sports Complex in Quezon City.

PhilCycling secured funds to construct a velodrome in early 2023 from the Union Cycliste Internationale (UCI). Construction the velodrome is ongoing as of March 2025. It was inaugurated on June 23, 2025.

The velodrome hosted the 2026 Asian Track Cycling Championships from March, and the 2026 Aero Gymnastics Asian Championships in August.

== Facilities ==
The Tagaytay City Velodrome is hailed as the first UCI-standard indoor velodrome in the Philippines. Its cycling track measures 250 meters (820 ft) and is 7.1 meters (23 ft) wide. Canadian company Junek Velodrome built the sporting facility. It can accommodate an audience of approximately 3,000 people. It has a Category A homologation certification, which means it is suitable to host a UCI Track Cycling World Championships.
