= Shin Dong-in =

South Korean cyclist (born 1994)

Personal information
- Born: 21 June 1994 (age 32)

Cycling career
- Sport: Cycling
- Discipline: Track cycling
- Role: Rider
Medal record
Men's track cycling
Representing South Korea
Asian Games
Silver medal – second place	2022 Hangzhou	Madison
Bronze medal – third place	2022 Hangzhou	Team pursuit
Asian Championships
Gold medal – first place	2016 Izu	Madison
Gold medal – first place	2019 Jakarta	Team pursuit
Gold medal – first place	2020 Jincheon	Madison
Silver medal – second place	2020 Jincheon	Team pursuit
Silver medal – second place	2022 New Delhi	Team pursuit
Bronze medal – third place	2015 Nakhon Ratchasima	Points race
Bronze medal – third place	2015 Nakhon Ratchasima	Team pursuit
Bronze medal – third place	2016 Izu	Team pursuit
Bronze medal – third place	2019 Jakarta	Omnium
Bronze medal – third place	2020 Jincheon	Omnium

Shin Dong-in (born 21 June 1994) is a South Korean male track cyclist. He won the gold medal in the madison and the bronze medal in the team pursuit at the 2016 Asian Cycling Championships.
