= Qin Chenlu =

Chinese bicycle racer

Qin Chenglu
Personal information
- Born: 24 October 1992 (age 33)

Cycling career
- Sport: Cycling
- Discipline: Track cycling
- Role: Rider

Professional teams
- 2012–2016: Max Success Sports
- 2017: Mitchelton Scott
Medal record
Men's track cycling
Representing China
Asian Championships
Gold medal – first place	2016 Izu	team pursuit

Qin Chenglu (Chinese: 秦晨路; pinyin: Qín Chénlù; born 24 October 1992) is a Chinese male track cyclist. He participated at the 2015 UCI Track Cycling World Championships. He won the gold medal in the team pursuit at the 2016 Asian Cycling Championships.
