= Keitaro Sawada =

Japanese cyclist

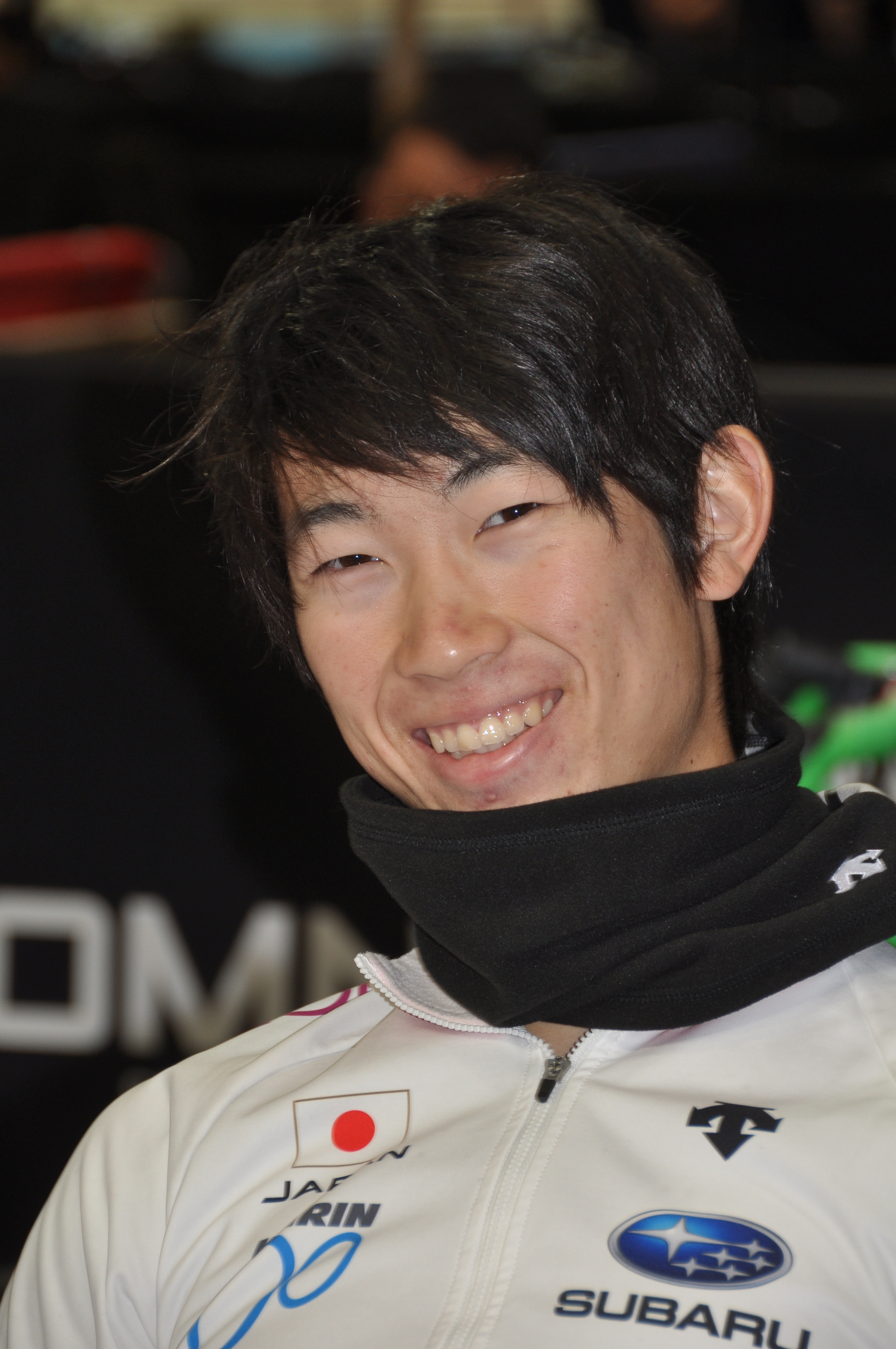
- Sawada at the 2018 UCI Track Cycling World Championships

Personal information
- Full name: Keitaro Sawada; Japanese: 沢田 桂太郎
- Born: 21 January 1998 (age 28)

Cycling career
- Sport: Cycling
- Current team: Sparkle Ōita Racing Team
- Disciplines: Road; Track
- Role: Rider

Amateur teams
- 2017: Nihon University
- 2021–: Sparkle Ōita Racing Team

Professional team
- 2018–2020: Team Bridgestone Cycling
Medal record
Men's track cycling
Representing Japan
Asian Championships
Gold medal – first place	2020 Jincheon	Team pursuit

Keitaro Sawada (沢田 桂太郎, Sawada Keitarō; born 21 January 1998) is a Japanese racing cyclist, who currently rides for Japanese amateur team Sparkle Ōita Racing Team. He rode in the men's team pursuit event at the 2018 UCI Track Cycling World Championships.

== Major results ==
2015
1st Road race, Asian Junior Cycling Championships
1st Road race, National Junior Road Championships
2019
1st Prologue Tour de Kumano
