= Cycling at the 2014 Asian Games =

- Venue: Incheon International Velodrome; Songdo Road Cycling Course; Yeongjong Baegunsan MTB Course; Ganghwa Asiad BMX Track
- Dates: 20 September – 1 October 2014
- Competitors: 224 from 32 nations

Cycling at the 2014 Asian Games was held in Incheon, South Korea in four Olympic disciplines from 20 September to 1 October 2014.

Road bicycle racing was held at the Songdo Road Cycling Course from September 27 to 28, while track cycling was contested at Incheon International Velodrome from September 20 to 25, and mountain biking was contested at Yeongjong Baegunsan MTB Course on September 30, and BMX racing was contested at the Ganghwa Asiad BMX Track on October 1.

== Schedule ==
●	1st day	●	Final day	Q	Qualification	E	Elimination rounds	F	Finals

Event↓/Date →	20th Sat		21st Sun		22nd Mon		23rd Tue	24th Wed		25th Thu		26th Fri	27th Sat	28th Sun	29th Mon	30th Tue	1st Wed	
BMX racing
Men																	Q	F
Women																	Q	F
Mountain bike
Men's cross-country																F		
Women's cross-country																F		
Road
Men's road race														F				
Men's individual time trial													F					
Women's road race															F			
Women's individual time trial													F					
Track
Men's sprint					Q	E	E	E	F									
Men's keirin										E	F							
Men's omnium					●		●											
Men's team sprint	Q	F																
Men's team pursuit	Q		E	F														
Women's sprint							Q	E		E	F							
Women's keirin			E	F														
Women's omnium								●		●								
Women's team sprint	Q	F																
Women's team pursuit			Q		E	F												

== Medalists ==
=== BMX ===
Event	Gold	Silver	Bronze
Men	Daniel Caluag; Philippines	Masahiro Sampei; Japan	Zhu Yan; China
Women	Amanda Carr; Thailand	Lu Yan; China	Peng Na; China

=== Mountain bike ===
Event	Gold	Silver	Bronze
Men's cross-country	Wang Zhen; China	Chan Chun Hing; Hong Kong	Kohei Yamamoto; Japan
Women's cross-country	Shi Qinglan; China	Yang Ling; China	Yukari Nakagome; Japan

=== Road ===
Event	Gold	Silver	Bronze
Men's road race	Jang Kyung-gu; South Korea	Arvin Moazzami; Iran	Leung Chun Wing; Hong Kong
Men's individual time trial	Alexey Lutsenko; Kazakhstan	Eugen Wacker; Kyrgyzstan	Hossein Askari; Iran
Women's road race	Jutatip Maneephan; Thailand	Nguyễn Thị Thật; Vietnam	Hsiao Mei-yu; Chinese Taipei
Women's individual time trial	Na Ah-reum; South Korea	Li Wenjuan; China	Jamie Wong; Hong Kong

=== Track ===
Event	Gold	Silver	Bronze
Men's sprint	Seiichiro Nakagawa; Japan	Tomoyuki Kawabata; Japan	Bao Saifei; China
Men's keirin	Mohammad Daneshvar; Iran	Kazunari Watanabe; Japan	Josiah Ng; Malaysia
Men's omnium	Eiya Hashimoto; Japan	Cho Ho-sung; South Korea	Cheung King Lok; Hong Kong
Men's team sprint	South Korea; Son Je-yong; Kang Dong-jin; Im Chae-bin	China; Hu Ke; Bao Saifei; Xu Chao	Japan; Tomoyuki Kawabata; Kazunari Watanabe; Seiichiro Nakagawa
Men's team pursuit	China; Shi Tao; Yuan Zhong; Qin Chenlu; Liu Hao; Shen Pingan	South Korea; Im Jae-yeon; Park Sang-hoon; Park Seon-ho; Park Keon-woo; Jang Sun-jae	Japan; Shogo Ichimaru; Kazushige Kuboki; Eiya Hashimoto; Ryo Chikatani
Women's sprint	Lee Wai Sze; Hong Kong	Zhong Tianshi; China	Lin Junhong; China
Women's keirin	Lee Wai Sze; Hong Kong	Fatehah Mustapa; Malaysia	Zhong Tianshi; China
Women's omnium	Hsiao Mei-yu; Chinese Taipei	Luo Xiaoling; China	Na Ah-reum; South Korea
Women's team sprint	China; Gong Jinjie; Zhong Tianshi	South Korea; Kim Won-gyeong; Lee Hye-jin	Chinese Taipei; Hsiao Mei-yu; Huang Ting-ying
Women's team pursuit	China; Zhao Baofang; Huang Dongyan; Jiang Wenwen; Jing Yali	South Korea; Son Hee-jung; Kim You-ri; Lee Ju-mi; Na Ah-reum; Lee Min-hye; Rhee Chae-kyung	Chinese Taipei; Hsiao Mei-yu; Huang Ting-ying; Tseng Hsiao-chia; I Fang-ju

== Medal table ==
Rank	Nation	Gold	Silver	Bronze	Total
1	China (CHN)	5	6	5	16
2	South Korea (KOR)	3	4	1	8
3	Japan (JPN)	2	3	4	9
4	Hong Kong (HKG)	2	1	3	6
5	Thailand (THA)	2	0	0	2
6	Iran (IRI)	1	1	1	3
7	Chinese Taipei (TPE)	1	0	3	4
8	Kazakhstan (KAZ)	1	0	0	1
8	Philippines (PHI)	1	0	0	1
10	Malaysia (MAS)	0	1	1	2
11	Kyrgyzstan (KGZ)	0	1	0	1
11	Vietnam (VIE)	0	1	0	1
Totals (12 entries)		18	18	18	54

== Participating nations ==
A total of 224 athletes from 32 nations competed in cycling at the 2014 Asian Games:

- Afghanistan (2)
- Bahrain (2)
- China (30)
- Chinese Taipei (7)
- Hong Kong (14)
- India (6)
- Indonesia (11)
- Iran (14)
- Japan (22)
- Jordan (2)
- Kazakhstan (8)
- Kuwait (4)
- Kyrgyzstan (1)
- Laos (1)
- Lebanon (2)
- Macau (3)
- Malaysia (7)
- Mongolia (7)
- Nepal (3)
- Pakistan (1)
- Philippines (4)
- Qatar (5)
- Saudi Arabia (5)
- Singapore (1)
- South Korea (29)
- Syria (4)
- Thailand (9)
- Timor-Leste (2)
- Turkmenistan (2)
- United Arab Emirates (4)
- Uzbekistan (7)
- Vietnam (5)
