= 2016 Asian Cycling Championships =

- Venue: Izu, Japan
- Date: 19–30 January 2016
- Velodrome: Izu Velodrome

The 2016 Asian Cycling Championships took place at Izu Ōshima and at the Izu Velodrome in Izu, Japan from 19 to 30 January 2016.

== Medal summary ==
=== Road ===
==== Men ====
Event	Gold	Silver	Bronze
Individual road race	Cheung King Lok; Hong Kong	Yukiya Arashiro; Japan	Fumiyuki Beppu; Japan
Individual time trial	Cheung King Lok; Hong Kong	Choe Hyeong-min; South Korea	Alireza Haghi; Iran

==== Women ====
Event	Gold	Silver	Bronze
Individual road race	Na Ah-reum; South Korea	Pu Yixian; China	Mayuko Hagiwara; Japan
Individual time trial	Mayuko Hagiwara; Japan	Lee Ju-mi; South Korea	Pang Yao; Hong Kong

=== Track ===
==== Men ====
Event	Gold	Silver	Bronze
Sprint	Im Chae-bin; South Korea	Xu Chao; China	Azizulhasni Awang; Malaysia
1 km time trial	Mohammad Daneshvar; Iran	Shugo Hayasaka; Japan	Kim Woo-gyeom; South Korea
Keirin	Im Chae-bin; South Korea	Xu Chao; China	Azizulhasni Awang; Malaysia
Individual pursuit	Cheung King Lok; Hong Kong	Dias Omirzakov; Kazakhstan	Min Kyeong-ho; South Korea
Points race	Min Kyeong-ho; South Korea	Cheung King Lok; Hong Kong	Chen Chien-liang; Chinese Taipei
Scratch	Takuto Kurabayashi; Japan	Robert Gaineyev; Kazakhstan	Park Keon-woo; South Korea
Omnium	Eiya Hashimoto; Japan	Artyom Zakharov; Kazakhstan	Liu Hao; China
Madison	South Korea; Park Keon-woo; Shin Dong-in	Hong Kong; Cheung King Lok; Leung Chun Wing	Kazakhstan; Nikita Panassenko; Robert Gaineyev
Team sprint	South Korea; Kang Dong-jin; Im Chae-bin; Son Je-yong	China; Hu Ke; Xu Chao; Bao Saifei	Japan; Seiichiro Nakagawa; Kazunari Watanabe; Kazuki Amagai
Team pursuit	China; Liu Hao; Fan Yang; Qin Chenlu; Shen Pingan; Xue Chaohua	Japan; Kazushige Kuboki; Shogo Ichimaru; Ryo Chikatani; Hiroaki Harada	South Korea; Park Keon-woo; Kim Ok-cheol; Min Kyeong-ho; Shin Dong-in; Im Jae-yeon

==== Women ====
Event	Gold	Silver	Bronze
Sprint	Lin Junhong; China	Lee Hye-jin; South Korea	Lee Wai Sze; Hong Kong
500 m time trial	Zhong Tianshi; China	Lee Wai Sze; Hong Kong	Hsiao Mei-yu; Chinese Taipei
Keirin	Lee Wai Sze; Hong Kong	Fatehah Mustapa; Malaysia	Lee Hye-jin; South Korea
Individual pursuit	Huang Ting-ying; Chinese Taipei	Yang Qianyu; Hong Kong	Son Eun-ju; South Korea
Points race	Huang Ting-ying; Chinese Taipei	Jupha Somnet; Malaysia	Minami Uwano; Japan
Scratch	Yumi Kajihara; Japan	Huang Ting-ying; Chinese Taipei	Jupha Somnet; Malaysia
Omnium	Luo Xiaoling; China	Hsiao Mei-yu; Chinese Taipei	Sakura Tsukagoshi; Japan
Team sprint	China; Gong Jinjie; Zhong Tianshi	South Korea; Lee Hye-jin; Cho Sun-young	Japan; Takako Ishii; Kayono Maeda
Team pursuit	China; Huang Dongyan; Ma Menglu; Wang Hong; Chen Lulu	Japan; Sakura Tsukagoshi; Minami Uwano; Kisato Nakamura; Yumi Kajihara	South Korea; Kim You-ri; Son Eun-ju; Lee Joo-hee; Kang Hyun-kyung

== Medal table ==
Rank	Nation	Gold	Silver	Bronze	Total
1	South Korea	6	4	7	17
2	China	6	4	1	11
3	Japan	4	4	6	14
4	Hong Kong	4	4	2	10
5	Chinese Taipei	2	2	2	6
6	Iran	1	0	1	2
7	Kazakhstan	0	3	1	4
8	Malaysia	0	2	3	5
Totals (8 entries)		23	23	23	69
