= Cycling at the 2014 Asian Games – Women's team pursuit =

Women's team pursuit at the 2014 Asian Games
- Venue: Incheon International Velodrome
- Date: 21–22 September 2014
- Competitors: 22 from 5 nations

Medalists
gold medal	China; Zhao Baofang, Huang Dongyan, Jiang Wenwen, Jing Yali
silver medal	South Korea; Son Hee-jung, Kim You-ri, Lee Ju-mi, Na Ah-reum, Lee Min-hye, Rhee Chae-kyung
bronze medal	Chinese Taipei; Hsiao Mei-yu, Huang Ting-ying, Tseng Hsiao-chia, I Fang-ju

The women's 4 kilometres team pursuit competition at the 2014 Asian Games was held on 21 and 22 September at the Incheon International Velodrome.

== Schedule ==
All times are Korea Standard Time (UTC+09:00)

Date	Time	Event
Sunday, 21 September 2014	16:40	Qualifying
Monday, 22 September 2014	16:00	First round
Monday, 22 September 2014	17:40	Finals

== Records ==
Prior to this competition, the existing world, Asian and Games records were as follows.

World Record	Great Britain	4:16.552	Aguascalientes, Mexico	5 December 2013
Asian Record	China	4:27.104	Aguascalientes, Mexico	5 December 2013
Games Record	—	—	—	—

== Results ==
=== Qualifying ===
Rank	Team	Time	Notes
1	China (CHN); Zhao Baofang; Huang Dongyan; Jiang Wenwen; Jing Yali	4:33.064	GR
2	Hong Kong (HKG); Diao Xiaojuan; Leung Bo Yee; Meng Zhaojuan; Jamie Wong	4:42.156	
3	South Korea (KOR); Son Hee-jung; Lee Min-hye; Kim You-ri; Na Ah-reum	4:43.957	
4	Chinese Taipei (TPE); Hsiao Mei-yu; Huang Ting-ying; Tseng Hsiao-chia; I Fang-ju	4:44.396	
5	Japan (JPN); Kisato Nakamura; Minami Uwano; Kanako Kase; Sakura Tsukagoshi	4:47.970	

=== First round ===
==== Heat 1 ====
Rank	Team	Time	Notes
1	Japan (JPN); Kisato Nakamura; Minami Uwano; Kanako Kase; Sakura Tsukagoshi	4:39.723	

==== Heat 2 ====
Rank	Team	Time	Notes
1	South Korea (KOR); Rhee Chae-kyung; Son Hee-jung; Kim You-ri; Na Ah-reum	4:37.894	
2	Hong Kong (HKG); Diao Xiaojuan; Leung Bo Yee; Meng Zhaojuan; Jamie Wong	4:54.305	

==== Heat 3 ====
Rank	Team	Time	Notes
1	China (CHN); Zhao Baofang; Huang Dongyan; Jiang Wenwen; Jing Yali	4:36.364	
2	Chinese Taipei (TPE); Hsiao Mei-yu; Huang Ting-ying; Tseng Hsiao-chia; I Fang-ju	4:42.402	

==== Summary ====
Rank	Team	Time
3	Japan (JPN)	4:39.723
4	Chinese Taipei (TPE)	4:42.402
5	Hong Kong (HKG)	4:54.305

=== Finals ===
==== Bronze ====
Rank	Team	Time	Notes
3rd place, bronze medalist(s)	Chinese Taipei (TPE); Hsiao Mei-yu; Huang Ting-ying; Tseng Hsiao-chia; I Fang-ju	4:37.148	
4	Japan (JPN); Kisato Nakamura; Minami Uwano; Kanako Kase; Sakura Tsukagoshi	4:37.897	

==== Gold ====
Rank	Team	Time	Notes
1st place, gold medalist(s)	China (CHN); Zhao Baofang; Huang Dongyan; Jiang Wenwen; Jing Yali	4:28.469	GR
2nd place, silver medalist(s)	South Korea (KOR); Son Hee-jung; Kim You-ri; Lee Ju-mi; Na Ah-reum	Overlapped	
