= 2015 Asian Cycling Championships =

Continental cycling championships held in Asia in 2015

- Venue: Nakhon Ratchasima, Thailand
- Date: 4–14 February 2015
- Velodrome: King’s 80th Birthday Anniversary Velodrome

The 2015 Asian Cycling Championships took place at the King’s 80th Birthday Anniversary Velodrome in Nakhon Ratchasima, Thailand from 4 to 14 February 2015.

== Medal summary ==
=== Road ===
==== Men ====
Event	Gold	Silver	Bronze
Individual road race	Hossein Askari; Iran	Yousif Mirza; United Arab Emirates	Kohei Uchima; Japan
Individual time trial	Hossein Askari; Iran	Zhandos Bizhigitov; Kazakhstan	Choe Hyeong-min; South Korea

==== Women ====
Event	Gold	Silver	Bronze
Individual road race	Huang Ting-ying; Chinese Taipei	Hsiao Mei-yu; Chinese Taipei	Meng Zhaojuan; Hong Kong
Individual time trial	Na Ah-reum; South Korea	Mayuko Hagiwara; Japan	Tüvshinjargalyn Enkhjargal; Mongolia

=== Track ===
==== Men ====
Event	Gold	Silver	Bronze
Sprint	Tomoyuki Kawabata; Japan	Azizulhasni Awang; Malaysia	Kang Dong-jin; South Korea
1 km time trial	Im Chae-bin; South Korea	Wu Lok Chun; Hong Kong	Ehsan Khademi; Iran
Keirin	Azizulhasni Awang; Malaysia	Kazunari Watanabe; Japan	Worayut Kapunya; Thailand
Individual pursuit	Park Sang-hoon; South Korea	Cheung King Lok; Hong Kong	Ryo Chikatani; Japan
Points race	Takuto Kurabayashi; Japan	Yousif Mirza; United Arab Emirates	Shin Dong-in; South Korea
Scratch	Behnam Khosroshahi; Iran	Jan Paul Morales; Philippines	Liu Ching-feng; Chinese Taipei
Omnium	Timur Gumerov; Uzbekistan	Im Jae-yeon; South Korea	Artyom Zakharov; Kazakhstan
Madison	Hong Kong; Cheung King Lok; Leung Chun Wing	Iran; Amir Zargari; Arvin Moazzami	South Korea; Park Keon-woo; Choi Seung-woo
Team sprint	South Korea; Im Chae-bin; Kang Dong-jin; Son Je-yong	Japan; Yudai Nitta; Kazunari Watanabe; Kazuki Amagai	China; Xu Chao; Bao Saifei; Hu Ke
Team pursuit	China; Liu Hao; Shen Pingan; Qin Chenlu; Liu Wei	Japan; Ryo Chikatani; Kazushige Kuboki; Takuto Kurabayashi; Shogo Ichimaru	South Korea; Shin Dong-in; Park Keon-woo; Im Jae-yeon; Park Sang-hoon

==== Women ====
Event	Gold	Silver	Bronze
Sprint	Lee Wai Sze; Hong Kong	Lin Junhong; China	Fatehah Mustapa; Malaysia
500 m time trial	Lee Wai Sze; Hong Kong	Fatehah Mustapa; Malaysia	Kayono Maeda; Japan
Keirin	Lin Junhong; China	Lee Hye-jin; South Korea	Lee Wai Sze; Hong Kong
Individual pursuit	Huang Ting-ying; Chinese Taipei	Yang Qianyu; Hong Kong	Supaksorn Nuntana; Thailand
Points race	Huang Ting-ying; Chinese Taipei	Rhee Chae-kyung; South Korea	Sakura Tsukagoshi; Japan
Scratch	Huang Ting-ying; Chinese Taipei	Pang Yao; Hong Kong	Yoko Kojima; Japan
Omnium	Luo Xiaoling; China	Diao Xiaojuan; Hong Kong	Hsiao Mei-yu; Chinese Taipei
Team sprint	South Korea; Lee Hye-jin; Choi Seul-gi	Japan; Takako Ishii; Kayono Maeda	China; Li Xuemei; Shi Jingjing
Team pursuit	China; Huang Dongyan; Zhao Baofang; Jing Yali; Jiang Wenwen	Hong Kong; Meng Zhaojuan; Leung Bo Yee; Yang Qianyu; Pang Yao	Japan; Kanako Kase; Sakura Tsukagoshi; Minami Uwano; Kisato Nakamura

== Medal table ==
Rank	Nation	Gold	Silver	Bronze	Total
1	South Korea	5	3	5	13
2	China	4	1	2	7
2	Chinese Taipei	4	1	2	7
4	Hong Kong	3	6	2	11
5	Iran	3	1	1	5
6	Japan	2	5	6	13
7	Malaysia	1	2	1	4
8	Uzbekistan	1	0	0	1
9	United Arab Emirates	0	2	0	2
10	Kazakhstan	0	1	1	2
11	Philippines	0	1	0	1
12	Thailand	0	0	2	2
13	Mongolia	0	0	1	1
Totals (13 entries)		23	23	23	69
