= Cycling at the 2016 Summer Olympics – Women's omnium =

Women's Omnium at the Games of the XXXI Olympiad
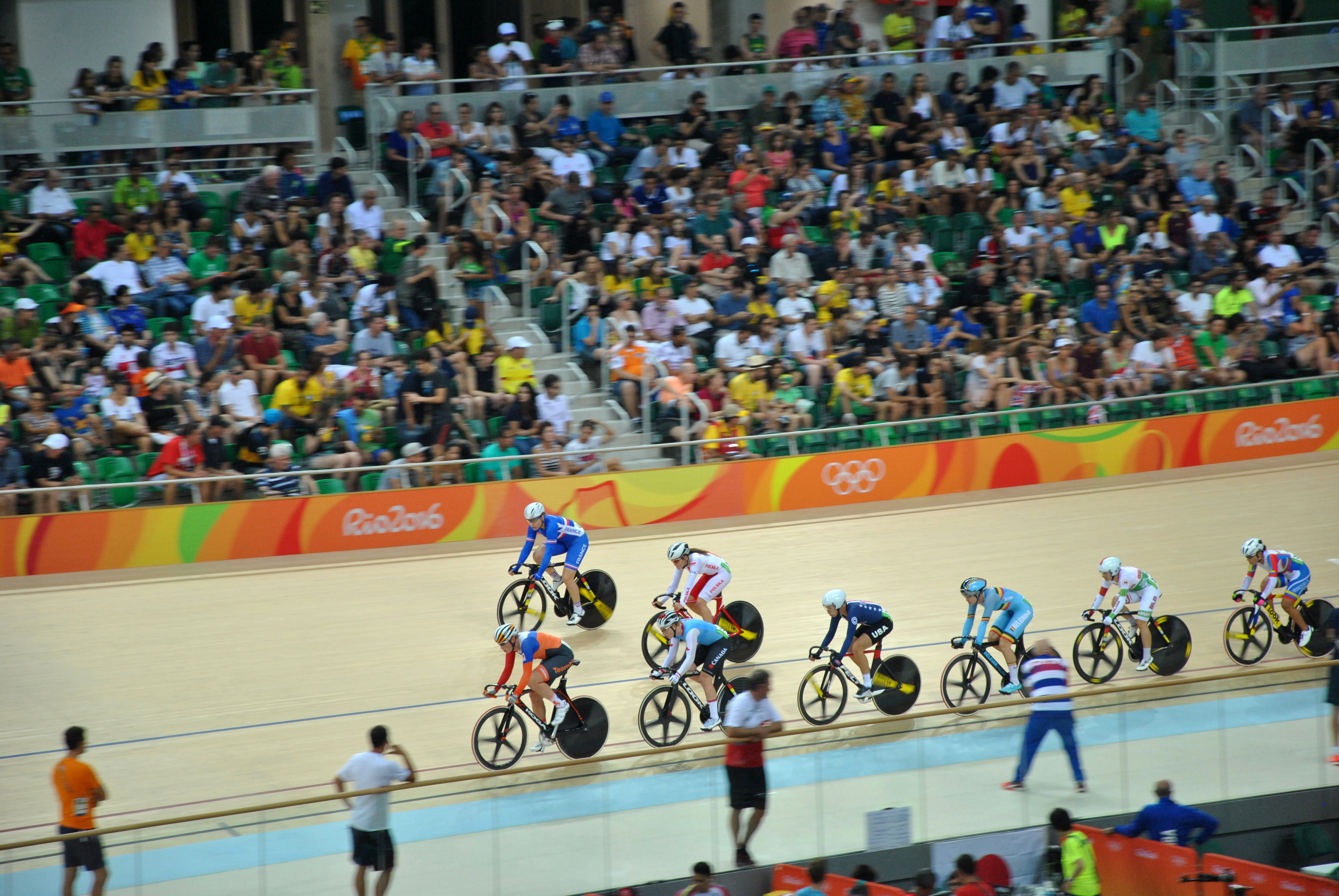
- Event on 15 August
- Venue: Rio Olympic Velodrome
- Date: 15–16 August 2016
- Competitors: 18 from 18 nations
- Winning points: 230

Medalists
1st place, gold medalist(s)		Laura Trott	Great Britain
2nd place, silver medalist(s)		Sarah Hammer	United States
3rd place, bronze medalist(s)		Jolien D'Hoore	Belgium

The women's cycling omnium at the 2016 Olympic Games in Rio de Janeiro took place at the Rio Olympic Velodrome on 15 and 16 August.

The medals were presented by Adam Pengilly, IOC member, Great Britain and Harald Hansen, Member of the UCI Management Committee.

== Competition format ==
The omnium competition consists of six events. During the first five events, riders receive points depending on their place, while during the final points race they can obtain points by winning sprints and taking laps during the event.

- Scratch race: a 10 km (6.2 mi) scratch race, with all riders competing at once and first across the line winning.
- Individual pursuit: a 3 km (1.9 mi) individual pursuit, with placing based on time.
- Elimination race: a "miss-and-out" elimination race, with the last rider in every sprint (each two laps) eliminated.
- Time trial: a 500 m (1,640.4 ft) time trial, with two riders (starting opposite the track) riding at once.
- Flying lap: an individual time trial over 250 m (820.2 ft) with a "flying start".
- Points race: a 20 km (12.4 mi) points race, with scoring for intermediate sprints as well as for lapping the pack.

== Schedule ==
All times are Brasília Time (UTC−03:00)

Date	Time	Round
Monday, 15 August 2016	10:59; 16:30; 18:17	10 km scratch race 3 km individual pursuit Elimination race
Tuesday, 16 August 2016	10:57; 16:10; 17:05	500 m time trial Flying lap 20 km points race

== Overall standings ==
Overall standings after the points race.

Rank	Rider	SR	IP	ER	TT	FL	PR	Total
1st place, gold medalist(s)	Laura Trott (GBR)	38	40	40	38	40	34	230
2nd place, silver medalist(s)	Sarah Hammer (USA)	34	38	36	32	32	34	206
3rd place, bronze medalist(s)	Jolien D'Hoore (BEL)	36	36	38	34	28	27	199
4	Lauren Ellis (NZL)	32	30	20	20	14	73	189
5	Amalie Dideriksen (DEN)	28	34	30	6	6	85	189
6	Kirsten Wild (NED)	24	32	34	16	34	43	183
7	Marlies Mejías (CUB)	18	26	6	26	24	73	173
8	Annette Edmondson (AUS)	30	28	32	40	38	0	168
9	Tatsiana Sharakova (BLR)	40	22	28	8	16	50	164
10	Laurie Berthon (FRA)	26	18	24	36	36	23	163
11	Allison Beveridge (CAN)	14	24	12	24	30	0	104
12	Diao Xiao Juan (HKG)	20	14	14	10	20	22	100
13	Anna Knauer (GER)	10	16	26	22	22	3	99
14	Daria Pikulik (POL)	22	20	10	14	26	0	92
15	Luo Xiaoling (CHN)	12	12	22	12	8	2	68
16	Sakura Tsukagoshi (JPN)	8	10	8	30	12	0	68
17	Hsiao Mei-yu (TPE)	16	6	16	28	18	−20	64
18	Angie González (VEN)	6	8	18	18	10	1	61

SR: Scratch race. IP: 3 km individual pursuit. ER: Elimination race.
TT: 500m time trial. FL: 250m flying lap. PR: Points race.

== Event results ==
=== Scratch race ===
Rank	Rider	Laps down	Points
1	Tatsiana Sharakova (BLR)	0	40
2	Laura Trott (GBR)	−1	38
3	Jolien D'Hoore (BEL)	−1	36
4	Sarah Hammer (USA)	−1	34
5	Lauren Ellis (NZL)	−1	32
6	Annette Edmondson (AUS)	−1	30
7	Amalie Dideriksen (DEN)	−1	28
8	Laurie Berthon (FRA)	−1	26
9	Kirsten Wild (NED)	−1	24
10	Daria Pikulik (POL)	−1	22
11	Diao Xiao Juan (HKG)	−1	20
12	Marlies Mejías (CUB)	−1	18
13	Hsiao Mei-yu (TPE)	−1	16
14	Allison Beveridge (CAN)	−1	14
15	Luo Xiaoling (CHN)	−1	12
16	Anna Knauer (GER)	−1	10
17	Sakura Tsukagoshi (JPN)	−1	8
18	Angie González (VEN)	−1	6

=== Individual pursuit ===
Rank	Rider	Time	Points	Overall	Overall rank
1	Laura Trott (GBR)	3:25.054	40	78	1
2	Sarah Hammer (USA)	3:26.988	38	72	2
3	Jolien D'Hoore (BEL)	3:30.202	36	72	2
4	Amalie Dideriksen (DEN)	3:30.264	34	62	4
5	Kirsten Wild (NED)	3:31.941	32	56	8
6	Lauren Ellis (NZL)	3:33.221	30	62	4
7	Annette Edmondson (AUS)	3:33.818	28	58	7
8	Marlies Mejías (CUB)	3:34.034	26	44	9
9	Allison Beveridge (CAN)	3:36.938	24	38	12
10	Tatsiana Sharakova (BLR)	3:37.204	22	62	4
11	Daria Pikulik (POL)	3:39.880	20	42	11
12	Laurie Berthon (FRA)	3:40.180	18	44	9
13	Anna Knauer (GER)	3:42.987	16	26	14
14	Diao Xiao Juan (HKG)	3:44.455	14	34	13
15	Luo Xiaoling (CHN)	3:45.186	12	24	15
16	Sakura Tsukagoshi (JPN)	3:46.842	10	18	16
17	Angie González (VEN)	3:47.161	8	14	18
18	Hsiao Mei-yu (TPE)	3:58.713	6	18	16

=== Elimination race ===
Rank	Rider	Points	Overall	Overall rank
1	Laura Trott (GBR)	40	118	1
2	Jolien D'Hoore (BEL)	38	110	2
3	Sarah Hammer (USA)	36	108	3
4	Kirsten Wild (NED)	34	90	5
5	Annette Edmondson (AUS)	32	90	5
6	Amalie Dideriksen (DEN)	30	92	4
7	Tatsiana Sharakova (BLR)	28	90	5
8	Anna Knauer (GER)	26	52	10
9	Laurie Berthon (FRA)	24	68	9
10	Luo Xiaoling (CHN)	22	46	15
11	Lauren Ellis (NZL)	20	82	8
12	Angie González (VEN)	18	32	17
13	Hsiao Mei-yu (TPE)	16	38	16
14	Diao Xiao Juan (HKG)	14	48	14
15	Allison Beveridge (CAN)	12	50	12
16	Daria Pikulik (POL)	10	52	10
17	Sakura Tsukagoshi (JPN)	8	26	18
18	Marlies Mejías (CUB)	6	50	12

=== Time trial ===
Rank	Rider	Time	Points	Overall	Overall rank
1	Annette Edmondson (AUS)	34.938	40	130	4
2	Laura Trott (GBR)	35.253	38	156	1
3	Laurie Berthon (FRA)	35.275	36	104	6
4	Jolien D'Hoore (BEL)	35.326	34	144	2
5	Sarah Hammer (USA)	35.366	32	140	3
6	Sakura Tsukagoshi (JPN)	35.625	30	56	17
7	Hsiao Mei-yu (TPE)	35.636	28	66	13
8	Marlies Mejías (CUB)	35.655	26	76	10
9	Allison Beveridge (CAN)	36.247	24	74	12
10	Anna Knauer (GER)	36.370	22	74	11
11	Lauren Ellis (NZL)	36.427	20	102	7
12	Angie González (VEN)	36.535	18	50	18
13	Kirsten Wild (NED)	36.562	16	106	5
14	Daria Pikulik (POL)	36.690	14	66	14
15	Luo Xiaoling (CHN)	36.944	12	58	15
16	Diao Xiao Juan (HKG)	36.944	10	58	16
17	Tatsiana Sharakova (BLR)	37.007	8	98	8
18	Amalie Dideriksen (DEN)	38.032	6	98	9

=== Flying lap ===
Rank	Rider	Time	Points	Overall	Overall rank
1	Laura Trott (GBR)	13.708	40	196	1
2	Annette Edmondson (AUS)	13.878	38	168	4
3	Laurie Berthon (FRA)	13.903	36	140	5
4	Kirsten Wild (NED)	14.023	34	140	5
5	Sarah Hammer (USA)	14.081	32	172	2
6	Allison Beveridge (CAN)	14.140	30	104	9
7	Jolien D'Hoore (BEL)	14.195	28	172	2
8	Daria Pikulik (POL)	14.409	26	92	13
9	Marlies Mejías (CUB)	14.441	24	100	11
10	Anna Knauer (GER)	14.447	22	96	12
11	Diao Xiao Juan (HKG)	14.499	20	78	15
12	Hsiao Mei-yu (TPE)	14.532	18	84	14
13	Tatsiana Sharakova (BLR)	14.564	16	114	8
14	Lauren Ellis (NZL)	14.574	14	116	7
15	Sakura Tsukagoshi (JPN)	14.638	12	68	16
16	Angie González (VEN)	14.660	10	60	18
17	Luo Xiaoling (CHN)	14.740	8	66	17
18	Amalie Dideriksen (DEN)	14.940	6	104	9

=== Points race ===
Rank	Rider	Sprint 1	Sprint 2	Sprint 3	Sprint 4	Sprint 5	Sprint 6	Sprint 7	Sprint 8	Sprint 9	Sprint 10	Lap Points	Subtotal Points Race	Overall	Overall rank
1	Amalie Dideriksen (DEN)	0	1	5	3	5	1	0	5	5	0	60	85	189	5
2	Lauren Ellis (NZL)	0	0	2	0	2	0	5	1	0	3	60	73	189	4
3	Marlies Mejías (CUB)	5	0	0	0	0	0	3	2	3	0	60	73	173	7
4	Tatsiana Sharakova (BLR)	0	0	0	5	0	0	0	3	2	0	40	50	164	9
5	Kirsten Wild (NED)	0	0	1	0	0	0	0	0	0	2	40	43	183	6
6	Sarah Hammer (USA)	0	5	0	0	0	3	0	0	1	5	20	34	206	2
7	Laura Trott (GBR)	1	2	0	2	3	5	0	0	0	1	20	34	230	1
8	Jolien D'Hoore (BEL)	0	3	0	1	1	2	0	0	0	0	20	27	199	3
9	Laurie Berthon (FRA)	0	0	3	0	0	0	0	0	0	0	20	23	163	10
10	Diao Xiao Juan (HKG)	0	0	0	0	0	0	2	0	0	0	20	22	100	12
11	Anna Knauer (GER)	3	0	0	0	0	0	0	0	0	0	0	3	99	13
12	Luo Xiaoling (CHN)	2	0	0	0	0	0	0	0	0	0	0	2	68	15
13	Angie González (VEN)	0	0	0	0	0	0	1	0	0	0	0	1	61	18
14	Sakura Tsukagoshi (JPN)	0	0	0	0	0	0	0	0	0	0	0	0	68	16
15	Daria Pikulik (POL)	0	0	0	0	0	0	0	0	0	0	0	0	92	14
16	Annette Edmondson (AUS)	0	0	0	0	0	0	0	0	0	0	0	0	168	8
17	Allison Beveridge (CAN)	0	0	0	0	0	0	0	0	0	0	0	0	104	11
18	Hsiao Mei-yu (TPE)	0	0	0	0	0	0	0	0	0	0	-20	-20	64	17
