= Cycling at the 2014 Asian Games – Women's road race =

Women's road race at the 2014 Asian Games
- Venue: Songdo Road Cycling Course
- Date: 29 September 2014
- Competitors: 23 from 12 nations

Medalists
gold medal	Jutatip Maneephan	Thailand
silver medal	Nguyễn Thị Thật	Vietnam
bronze medal	Hsiao Mei-yu	Chinese Taipei

The women's 126 kilometres road race competition at the 2014 Asian Games was held on 29 September.

== Schedule ==
All times are Korea Standard Time (UTC+09:00)

Date	Time	Event
Monday, 29 September 2014	12:00	Final

== Results ==
Rank	Athlete	Time
1st place, gold medalist(s)	Jutatip Maneephan (THA)	3:39:33
2nd place, silver medalist(s)	Nguyễn Thị Thật (VIE)	3:39:33
3rd place, bronze medalist(s)	Hsiao Mei-yu (TPE)	3:39:33
4	Diao Xiaojuan (HKG)	3:39:33
5	Huang Ting-ying (TPE)	3:39:33
6	Gu Sung-eun (KOR)	3:39:33
7	Zhang Nan (CHN)	3:39:33
8	Na Ah-reum (KOR)	3:39:33
9	Tang Kerong (CHN)	3:39:33
10	Dinah Chan (SIN)	3:39:33
11	Roba Helane (SYR)	3:39:33
12	Tüvshinjargalyn Enkhjargal (MGL)	3:39:33
13	Tserenlkhamyn Solongo (MGL)	3:39:33
14	Minami Uwano (JPN)	3:39:33
15	Nguyễn Phan Ngọc Trang (VIE)	3:39:33
16	Fitriani (INA)	3:39:33
17	Meng Zhaojuan (HKG)	3:39:33
18	Yanthi Fuchianty (INA)	3:39:33
19	Razan Soboh (JOR)	3:39:33
20	Samah Khaled (JOR)	3:39:33
21	Chanpeng Nontasin (THA)	3:39:33
22	Sakura Tsukagoshi (JPN)	3:39:33
23	Seba Al-Raai (SYR)	3:39:43
