= Cycling at the 2014 Asian Games – Men's cross-country =

Men's cross-country at the 2014 Asian Games
- Venue: Yeongjong Baegunsan MTB Course
- Date: 30 September 2014
- Competitors: 21 from 12 nations

Medalists
| gold medal | Wang Zhen | China |
| silver medal | Chan Chun Hing | Hong Kong |
| bronze medal | Kohei Yamamoto | Japan |

The men's cross-country competition at the 2014 Asian Games was held on 30 September 2014 at the Yeongjong Baegunsan MTB Course.

== Schedule ==
All times are Korea Standard Time (UTC+09:00)

| Date | Time | Event |
|---|---|---|
| Tuesday, 30 September 2014 | 10:00 | Final |

== Results ==
Legend

- DNF — Did not finish

| Rank | Athlete | Time |
|---|---|---|
| 1st place, gold medalist(s) | Wang Zhen (CHN) | 1:42:34 |
| 2nd place, silver medalist(s) | Chan Chun Hing (HKG) | 1:43:27 |
| 3rd place, bronze medalist(s) | Kohei Yamamoto (JPN) | 1:44:12 |
| 4 | Kirill Kazantsev (KAZ) | 1:45:25 |
| 5 | Kwon Soon-woo (KOR) | 1:48:58 |
| 6 | Yoo Bum-jin (KOR) | 1:49:15 |
| 7 | Toki Sawada (JPN) | 1:51:20 |
| 8 | Keerati Sukprasart (THA) | 1:51:35 |
| 9 | Faraz Shokri (IRI) | 1:52:12 |
| 10 | Parviz Mardani (IRI) | 1:52:35 |
| 11 | Peerapol Chawchiangkwang (THA) | 1:53:21 |
| 12 | Chandra Rafsanzani (INA) | 1:54:40 |
| 13 | Liu Xinyang (CHN) | 1:57:34 |
| 14 | Bandi Sugito (INA) | 1:58:56 |
| 15 | Baasankhüügiin Myagmarsüren (MGL) | −1 lap |
| 16 | Narayan Gopal Maharjan (NEP) | −2 laps |
| 17 | Bat-Erdeniin Narankhüü (MGL) | −2 laps |
| 18 | Zaher El-Hage (LIB) | −3 laps |
| 19 | Noelio Antonio Pereira (TLS) | −3 laps |
| 20 | Ajay Pandit Chhetri (NEP) | −4 laps |
| — | Artyom Golovachshenko (KAZ) | DNF |
