= Cycling at the 2010 Asian Games – Men's cross-country =

International sporting event

Men's cross-country at the 2010 Asian Games
- Venue: Dafushan Mountain Bike Course
- Date: 18 November 2010
- Competitors: 16 from 9 nations

Medalists
gold medal	Chan Chun Hing	Hong Kong
silver medal	Kohei Yamamoto	Japan
bronze medal	Duan Zhiqiang	China

The men's cross-country competition at the 2010 Asian Games in Guangzhou was held on 18 November at the Dafushan Mountain Bike Course. The race was 43.2 kilometers long and began with a mass start. and involved eight laps around the 5.4 kilometers.

== Schedule ==
All times are China Standard Time (UTC+08:00)

Date	Time	Event
Thursday, 18 November 2010	13:30	Final

== Results ==
Legend

- DNF — Did not finish

Rank	Athlete	Time
1st place, gold medalist(s)	Chan Chun Hing (HKG)	2:11:33
2nd place, silver medalist(s)	Kohei Yamamoto (JPN)	2:11:49
3rd place, bronze medalist(s)	Duan Zhiqiang (CHN)	2:14:06
4	Seiya Hirano (JPN)	2:19:49
5	Choi Jin-yong (KOR)	2:24:13
6	Peerapol Chawchiangkwang (THA)	2:26:54
7	Na Sang-hoon (KOR)	−4 laps
8	Narayan Gopal Maharjan (NEP)	−5 laps
9	Baasankhüügiin Myagmarsüren (MGL)	−6 laps
10	Raj Kumar Shrestha (NEP)	−6 laps
11	Youssef Bou Karam (LIB)	−6 laps
12	Johny Andreas Alves (TLS)	−7 laps
13	Jacinto da Costa (TLS)	−7 laps
14	Jamsrangiin Ölziibaatar (MGL)	−7 laps
—	Natawat Supachiwakun (THA)	DNF
—	Wang Zhen (CHN)	DNF
