= 2020 UCI Track Cycling World Championships – Women's omnium =

Women's omnium at the 2020 UCI Track Cycling World Championships
- Venue: Velodrom
- Location: Berlin, Germany
- Dates: 28 February
- Competitors: 24 from 24 nations
- Winning points: 121

Medalists
gold medal	Yumi Kajihara	Japan
silver medal	Letizia Paternoster	Italy
bronze medal	Daria Pikulik	Poland

The Women's omnium competition at the 2020 UCI Track Cycling World Championships was held on 28 February 2020.

== Results ==
=== Scratch race ===
The race was started at 15:00.

Rank	Name	Nation	Laps down	Event points
1	Yumi Kajihara	Japan		40
2	Jennifer Valente	United States		38
3	Clara Copponi	France		36
4	Maria Martins	Portugal		34
5	Letizia Paternoster	Italy		32
6	Daria Pikulik	Poland		30
7	Wang Xiaofei	China		28
8	Georgia Baker	Australia		26
9	Lydia Boylan	Ireland		24
10	Lee Sze Wing	Hong Kong		22
11	Jolien D'Hoore	Belgium		20
12	Anita Stenberg	Norway		18
13	Olga Zabelinskaya	Uzbekistan		16
14	Olivija Baleišytė	Lithuania		14
15	Amalie Dideriksen	Denmark		12
16	Andrea Waldis	Switzerland		10
17	Holly Edmondston	New Zealand		8
18	Tatsiana Sharakova	Belarus		6
19	Kirsten Wild	Netherlands	REL	4
20	Allison Beveridge	Canada	DNF	2
20	Laura Kenny	Great Britain	DNF	2
20	Rinata Sultanova	Kazakhstan	DNF	2
20	Lizbeth Salazar	Mexico	DNF	2
20	Huang Ting-ying	Chinese Taipei	DNF	2

=== Tempo race ===
The race was started at 16:55.

Rank	Name	Nation	Lap points	Total points	Event points
1	Tatsiana Sharakova	Belarus	20	27	40
2	Yumi Kajihara	Japan	20	26	38
3	Amalie Dideriksen	Denmark	20	22	36
4	Jennifer Valente	United States		6	34
5	Kirsten Wild	Netherlands		2	32
6	Daria Pikulik	Poland		2	30
7	Jolien D'Hoore	Belgium		1	28
8	Laura Kenny	Great Britain		0	26
9	Letizia Paternoster	Italy		0	24
10	Maria Martins	Portugal		0	22
11	Georgia Baker	Australia		0	20
12	Anita Stenberg	Norway		0	18
13	Lydia Boylan	Ireland		0	16
14	Wang Xiaofei	China		0	14
15	Holly Edmondston	New Zealand		0	12
16	Clara Copponi	France		0	10
17	Lee Sze Wing	Hong Kong		0	8
18	Andrea Waldis	Switzerland		0	6
19	Olga Zabelinskaya	Uzbekistan		0	4
20	Olivija Baleišytė	Lithuania		0	2
21	Rinata Sultanova	Kazakhstan		0	1
	Allison Beveridge	Canada	Did not start		
	Lizbeth Salazar	Mexico	Did not start		
	Huang Ting-ying	Chinese Taipei	Did not start		

=== Elimination race ===
The race was started at 19.34.

Rank	Name	Nation	Event points
1	Kirsten Wild	Netherlands	40
2	Letizia Paternoster	Italy	38
3	Yumi Kajihara	Japan	36
4	Jolien D'Hoore	Belgium	34
5	Georgia Baker	Australia	32
6	Maria Martins	Portugal	30
7	Amalie Dideriksen	Denmark	28
8	Daria Pikulik	Poland	26
9	Anita Stenberg	Norway	24
10	Wang Xiaofei	China	22
11	Laura Kenny	Great Britain	20
12	Andrea Waldis	Switzerland	18
13	Lydia Boylan	Ireland	16
14	Holly Edmondston	New Zealand	14
15	Olivija Baleišytė	Lithuania	12
16	Rinata Sultanova	Kazakhstan	10
17	Clara Copponi	France	8
18	Olga Zabelinskaya	Uzbekistan	6
19	Lee Sze Wing	Hong Kong	4
20	Jennifer Valente	United States	2
21	Tatsiana Sharakova	Belarus	1

=== Points race and overall standings ===
The points race was started at 21:01.

Rank	Name	Nation	Lap points	Sprint points	Total points
1st place, gold medalist(s)	Yumi Kajihara	Japan	0	7	121
2nd place, silver medalist(s)	Letizia Paternoster	Italy	0	15	109
3rd place, bronze medalist(s)	Daria Pikulik	Poland	0	14	100
4	Maria Martins	Portugal	0	4	92
5	Jennifer Valente	United States	0	11	85
6	Amalie Dideriksen	Denmark	0	9	85
7	Kirsten Wild	Netherlands	0	7	83
8	Jolien D'Hoore	Belgium	0	0	82
9	Anita Stenberg	Norway	0	6	66
10	Wang Xiaofei	China	0	0	64
11	Tatsiana Sharakova	Belarus	0	7	63
12	Laura Kenny	Great Britain	0	12	60
13	Lydia Boylan	Ireland	0	2	58
14	Georgia Baker	Australia	−20	0	56
15	Clara Copponi	France	0	1	55
16	Holly Edmondston	New Zealand	0	1	36
17	Lee Sze Wing	Hong Kong	0	0	34
18	Andrea Waldis	Switzerland	0	0	34
19	Olga Zabelinskaya	Uzbekistan	0	2	28
20	Rinata Sultanova	Kazakhstan	−20	0	−16
21	Olivija Baleišytė	Lithuania	−80	0	−52
–	Allison Beveridge	Canada	Did not finish		
–	Lizbeth Salazar	Mexico	Did not finish		
–	Huang Ting-ying	Chinese Taipei	Did not finish		
