= Cycling at the 2018 Asian Games – Women's omnium =

Women's omnium at the 2018 Asian Games
- Venue: Jakarta International Velodrome
- Date: 29 August 2018
- Competitors: 12 from 12 nations

Medalists
gold medal	Yumi Kajihara	Japan
silver medal	Huang Ting-ying	Chinese Taipei
bronze medal	Kim You-ri	South Korea

The women's omnium competition at the 2018 Asian Games was held on 29 August 2018 at the Jakarta International Velodrome.

== Schedule ==
All times are Western Indonesia Time (UTC+07:00)

Date	Time	Event
Wednesday, 29 August 2018	09:00	Scratch race
Wednesday, 29 August 2018	11:03	Tempo race
Wednesday, 29 August 2018	16:24	Elimination race
Wednesday, 29 August 2018	17:52	Points race

== Results ==
=== Scratch race ===
Rank	Athlete	Laps down	Points
1	Renata Baymetova (UZB)		40
2	Huang Ting-ying (TPE)	−1	38
3	Yumi Kajihara (JPN)	−1	36
4	Kim You-ri (KOR)	−1	34
5	Jupha Somnet (MAS)	−1	32
6	Jutatip Maneephan (THA)	−1	30
7	Wang Xiaofei (CHN)	−1	28
8	Diao Xiaojuan (HKG)	−1	26
9	Monorama Devi (IND)	−1	24
10	Ayustina Delia Priatna (INA)	−1	22
11	Luo Yiwei (SGP)	−1	20
12	Au Hoi Ian (MAC)	−1	18

=== Tempo race ===
Rank	Athlete	Sprints won	Laps		Total	Finish order	Points
Rank	Athlete	Sprints won	+	−	Total	Finish order	Points
1	Yumi Kajihara (JPN)	13, 14, 15, 16, 17, 18, 19, 20, 21, 22, 23, 24, 26			13	1	40
2	Huang Ting-ying (TPE)	1, 2, 3, 4, 5, 6, 8, 10, 12			9	11	38
3	Kim You-ri (KOR)	7, 9, 11			3	12	36
4	Diao Xiaojuan (HKG)				0	2	34
5	Jupha Somnet (MAS)				0	3	32
6	Wang Xiaofei (CHN)				0	4	30
7	Luo Yiwei (SGP)				0	5	28
8	Jutatip Maneephan (THA)				0	6	26
9	Ayustina Delia Priatna (INA)				0	7	24
10	Renata Baymetova (UZB)			20	−20	10	22
11	Monorama Devi (IND)			40	−40	8	20
12	Au Hoi Ian (MAC)			40	−40	9	18

=== Elimination race ===
Rank	Athlete	Points
1	Yumi Kajihara (JPN)	40
2	Huang Ting-ying (TPE)	38
3	Kim You-ri (KOR)	36
4	Wang Xiaofei (CHN)	34
5	Jupha Somnet (MAS)	32
6	Jutatip Maneephan (THA)	30
7	Diao Xiaojuan (HKG)	28
8	Ayustina Delia Priatna (INA)	26
9	Luo Yiwei (SGP)	24
10	Renata Baymetova (UZB)	22
11	Au Hoi Ian (MAC)	20
12	Monorama Devi (IND)	18

=== Points race ===
Rank	Athlete	Sprint								Laps		Total	Finish order
Rank	Athlete	1	2	3	4	5	6	7	8	+	−	Total	Finish order
1	Ayustina Delia Priatna (INA)	3	1						10	20		34	1
2	Wang Xiaofei (CHN)	2		5	1	5	5		6			24	2
3	Yumi Kajihara (JPN)		5	1	5	3	3	3	2			22	4
4	Jupha Somnet (MAS)				2					20		22	6
5	Renata Baymetova (UZB)									20		20	9
6	Kim You-ri (KOR)	5	3	3		1	2	1				15	5
7	Huang Ting-ying (TPE)		2	2	3	2	1	2				12	7
8	Jutatip Maneephan (THA)							5				5	10
9	Luo Yiwei (SGP)	1							4		20	−15	3
10	Au Hoi Ian (MAC)										20	−20	8
11	Monorama Devi (IND)										40	−40	
—	Diao Xiaojuan (HKG)											DNF	

=== Summary ===
Rank	Athlete	Scratch race	Tempo race	Elim. race	Points race	Total
1st place, gold medalist(s)	Yumi Kajihara (JPN)	36	40	40	22	138
2nd place, silver medalist(s)	Huang Ting-ying (TPE)	38	38	38	12	126
3rd place, bronze medalist(s)	Kim You-ri (KOR)	34	36	36	15	121
4	Jupha Somnet (MAS)	32	32	32	22	118
5	Wang Xiaofei (CHN)	28	30	34	24	116
6	Ayustina Delia Priatna (INA)	22	24	26	34	106
7	Renata Baymetova (UZB)	40	22	22	20	104
8	Jutatip Maneephan (THA)	30	26	30	5	91
9	Luo Yiwei (SGP)	20	28	24	−15	57
10	Au Hoi Ian (MAC)	18	18	20	−20	36
11	Monorama Devi (IND)	24	20	18	−40	22
—	Diao Xiaojuan (HKG)	26	34	28	DNF	DNF
