= Yumi Kajihara =

Japanese cyclist (born 1997)

Yumi Kajihara OLY
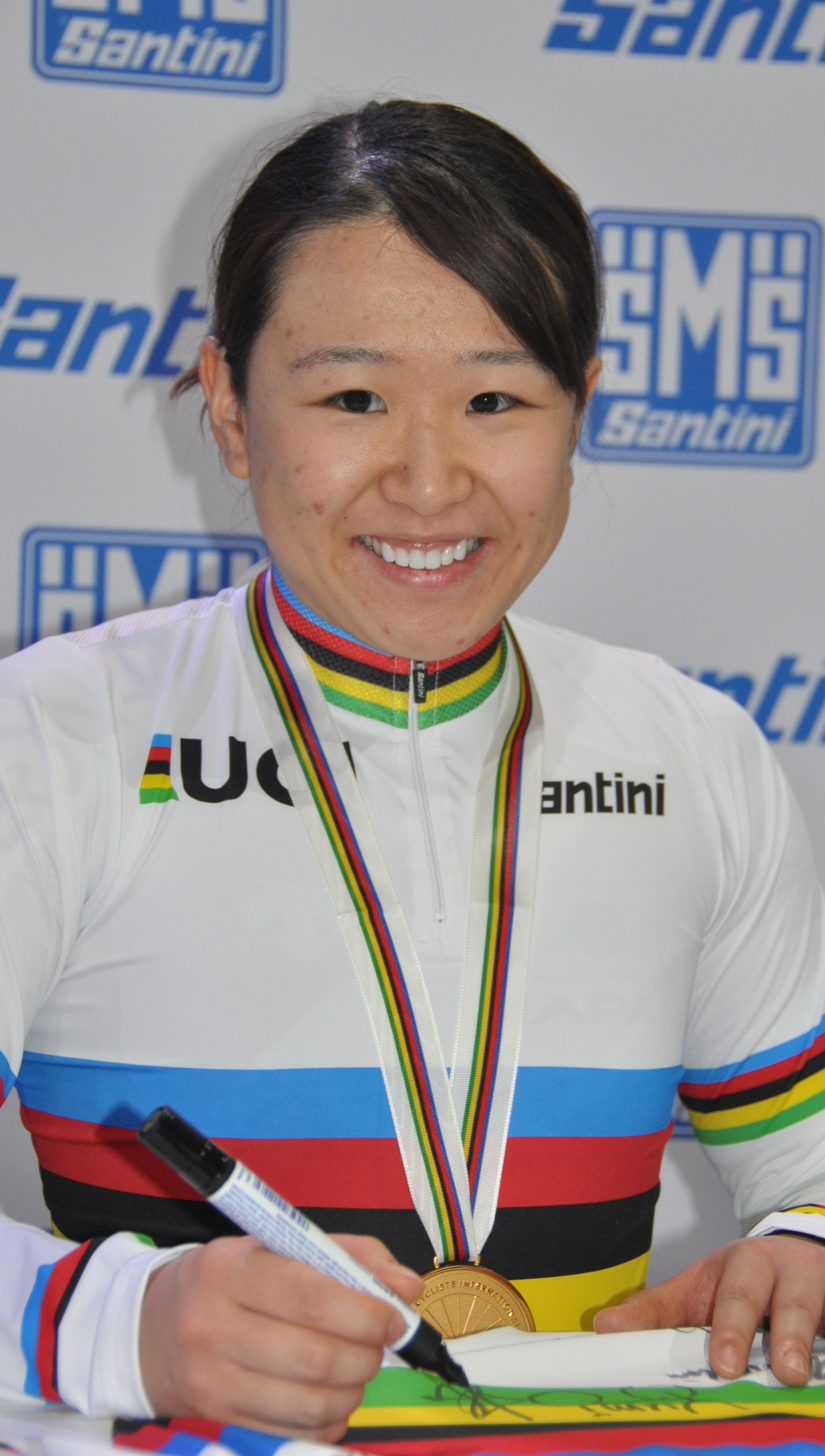
- Kajihara in February 2020

Personal information
- Born: 10 April 1997 (age 29) Wakō, Saitama, Japan
- Height: 155 cm (5 ft 1 in)
- Weight: 56 kg (123 lb)

Cycling career
- Sport: Cycling
- Current team: Team Yumi
- Disciplines: Track; Road
- Role: Rider
Medal record
Women's track cycling
Representing Japan
Event	1st	2nd	3rd
Summer Olympics	0	1	0
World Championships	1	0	1
Asian Games	4	1	1
Asian Championships	18	3	3
Total	23	5	5
Olympic Games
Silver medal – second place	2020 Tokyo	Omnium
World Championships
Gold medal – first place	2020 Berlin	Omnium
Silver medal – second place	2026 Shanghai	Elimination
Asian Games
Gold medal – first place	2018 Jakarta-Palembang	Omnium
Gold medal – first place	2022 Hangzhou	Omnium
Gold medal – first place	2022 Hangzhou	Team pursuit
Gold medal – first place	2026 Aichi–Nagoya	Omnium
Silver medal – second place	2026 Aichi–Nagoya	Team pursuit
Bronze medal – third place	2018 Jakarta-Palembang	Team pursuit
Asian Championships
Gold medal – first place	2016 Izu	Scratch
Gold medal – first place	2017 New Delhi	Points race
Gold medal – first place	2017 New Delhi	Omnium
Gold medal – first place	2018 Nilai	Omnium
Gold medal – first place	2018 Nilai	Madison
Gold medal – first place	2018 Nilai	Team pursuit
Gold medal – first place	2019 Jakarta	Omnium
Gold medal – first place	2019 Jakarta	Madison
Gold medal – first place	2020 Jincheon	Omnium
Gold medal – first place	2023 Nilai	Scratch
Gold medal – first place	2023 Nilai	Omnium
Gold medal – first place	2023 Nilai	Madison
Gold medal – first place	2023 Nilai	Team pursuit
Gold medal – first place	2024 New Delhi	Elimination
Gold medal – first place	2024 New Delhi	Omnium
Gold medal – first place	2024 New Delhi	Team pursuit
Gold medal – first place	2025 Nilai	Team pursuit
Gold medal – first place	2025 Nilai	Madison
Silver medal – second place	2016 Izu	Team pursuit
Silver medal – second place	2017 New Delhi	Individual pursuit
Silver medal – second place	2019 Jakarta	Team pursuit
Bronze medal – third place	2017 New Delhi	Road time trial
Bronze medal – third place	2017 New Delhi	Madison
Bronze medal – third place	2020 Jincheon	Team pursuit

Yumi Kajihara (梶原 悠未, Kajihara Yūmi; born 10 April 1997) is a Japanese professional female road racing and track cyclist. She represented Japan at the 2020 Summer Olympics, and won a silver medal in the women's omnium, becoming the first Japanese woman to win an Olympic medal in cycling.

== Biography ==
During elementary school, Kajihara took five extracurricular lessons, including swimming, piano, calligraphy, and ballet.

Kajihara participated in the Junior Olympics every year in swimming from the fourth grade of elementary school, but after missing out on the national championships in her third year of junior high school, she began to think about trying a new sport, and at her father's urging, she applied to the Yamato Boat Racing School, a training school for boat racers, but failed. After entering Sakado High School, which is directly related to the University of Tsukuba, she was invited by the cycling club advisor to start cycling. Kajihara began practicing with no prior experience, and qualified to compete in the Inter-High School Championships in just two months. Ten months later, she won all three events she participated in the National Championships. The following year, in 2015, she won five titles at the Junior Asian Championships.

She received offers from universities with a good track record in intercollegiate competitions, but decided to attend the University of Tsukuba instead, which is not a strong university, because she felt she could "create the environment to become the best in the world." She came up with her own training menu, and her mother accompanied her to all of his domestic races and supported her by riding alongside her on a motorcycle during practice.

After graduating from university, Kajihara became a sports advisor for Taiken Gakuen School Corporation on May 1, 2020.

== Career ==
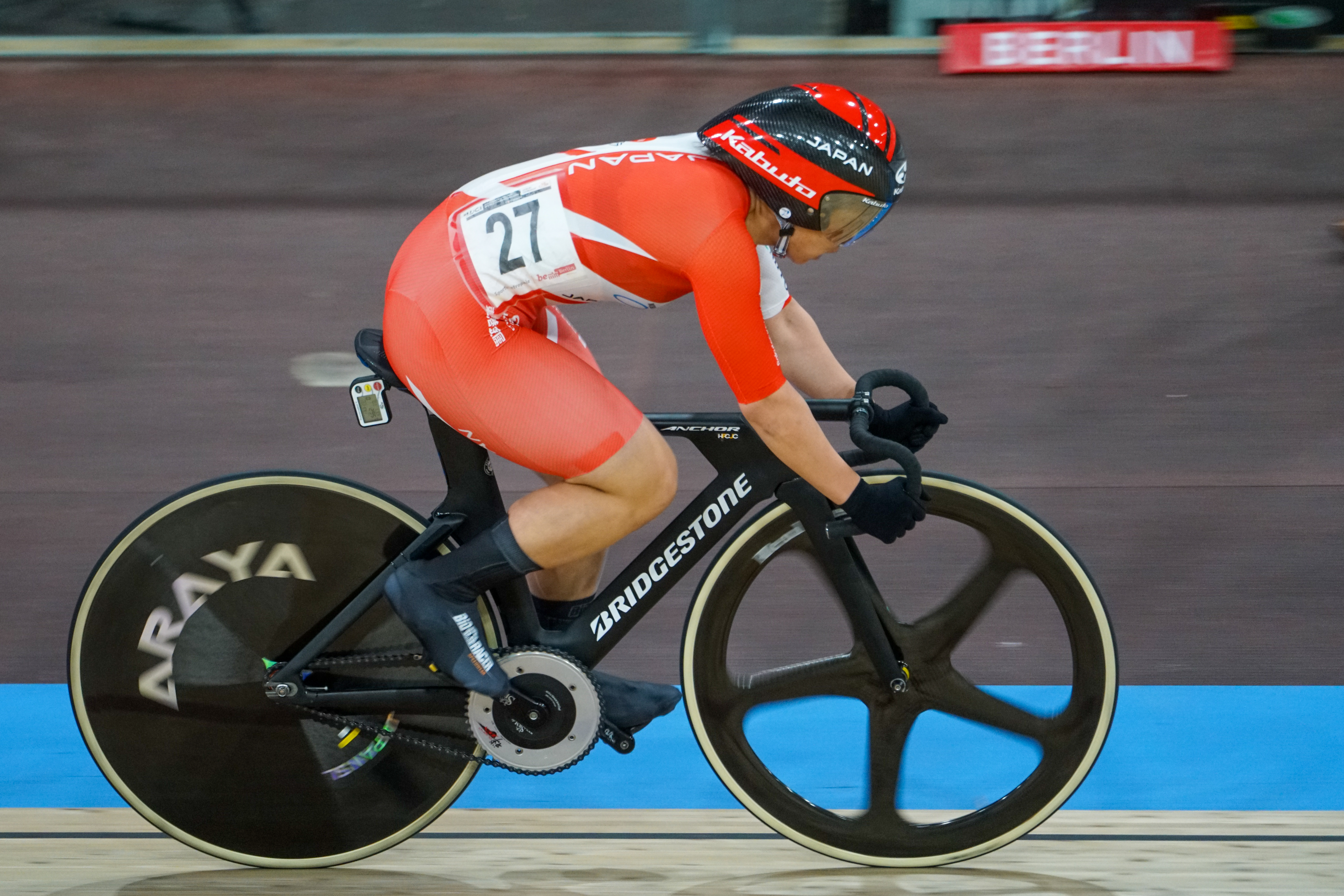
Kajihara at the 2020 UCI Road World Championships.

As a junior, she competed on the road in the junior events at the 2015 UCI Road World Championships and 2014 UCI Road World Championships. She won the gold medal in the scratch and the silver medal in the team pursuit at the 2016 Asian Cycling Championships. She is the reigning world champion in Women's omnium, having won gold in 2020.

On June 4, she was selected as a representative for the track cycling event at the 2020 Tokyo Olympics.

In August 2021, she participated in the cycling events at the 2020 Tokyo Olympics. On August 6, she competed in the women's madison track cycling event with Kisato Nakamura, but she was two laps behind and withdrew midway through, placing 13th. On August 8, she won the silver medal in the women's omnium, becoming the first Japanese female Olympic cyclist to win an Olympic medal. She was the only Japanese athlete to receive a medal on the podium at a venue with spectators. She was also presented with the first Citizen's Honor Award by her hometown of Wakō, Saitama.

In April 2022, she became a full-time lecturer at the Japan Wellness Sports University.

Aiming for the Paris Olympics, Kajihara relocated her training ground in Switzerland on February 2023 for about half a year, becoming the first Japanese woman to join the World Cycling Centre road team. In Europe, the home of cycling, she aimed to improve her endurance, which has been an issue for her.

After returning to Japan, she suffered a series of injuries, including damaging the ligaments in her left knee after falling off the bike during a race. As her chronic illnesses worsened, the situation caused her to undergo two major surgeries. However, at the second round of the 2024 UCI Track Cycling Nations Cup, her last international competition before the 2024 Paris Olympics, she won gold medals in the omnium and elimination events and a bronze medal in the team pursuit.

In the cycling events at the Paris Olympics in August 2024, Kajihara competed in the women's team pursuit and women's omnium. She competed in the pursuit qualifying round with Tsuyaka Uchino, Mizuki Ikeda and Maho Kakita, and finished with a total time of 4 minutes 13.818 seconds, which broke the Japanese record, but she was eliminated in 10th place overall. In the omnium race, she was ranked number one in the world and was expected to win the gold medal, but she started off slowly in the first event, scratch, in 16th place, was never able to take the lead in the second event, tempo, and was the second athlete to be eliminated in the third event, her specialty event, elimination, and was in 20th place at the end of the third event. After the third event, when her chances of winning a medal seemed remote, she received a phone call from her mother telling her to "do your best until the end for yourself," which helped her change her mindset. She won lap points in the final event, the points race, and made a comeback, but her early start affected her and she finished on 17th place.

== Accomplishments ==
=== Track ===
2016
Asian Track Championships

1st Scratch
2nd Team pursuit (with Kisato Nakamura, Sakura Tsukagoshi and Minami Uwano

Track Clubs ACC Cup

1st Omnium
1st Points race
1st Team sprint (With Takako Ishii)
2nd Scratch

1st Omnium, Japan Track Cup
2017
Asian Track Championships

1st Omnium
1st Points race
2nd Individual pursuit
3rd Madison (with Kie Furuyama)

National Track Championships

1st Individual pursuit
1st Points Race

=== Road ===
2014
1st Road race, National Junior Road Championships
Asian Road Championships

2nd Time trial
2nd Road race

2015
National Junior Road Championships

1st Road race
1st Time trial

Asian Road Championships

1st Time trial
1st Road race

2016
National Road Championships

2nd Time trial
3rd Road race

2017
2nd Time trial, National Road Championships
Asian Road Championships

3rd Time trial
5th Road race

2018
National Under-23 Road Championships

1st Time trial
3rd Road race

Panorama Guizhou International Women's Road Cycling Race

1st Stage 2, 4 & 5
1st Points classification

7th Overall Tour of Zhoushan Island
2019
1st Overall The 60th Anniversary "Thai Cycling Association"

1st Stage 2

Asian Road Championships

2nd Under-23 Time trial
8th Road race

3rd Overall Tour of Thailand
4th Time trial, National Road Championships
