= Cycling at the 2022 Asian Games – Women's individual time trial =

Women's individual time trial at the 2022 Asian Games
- Venue: Chun'an Jieshou Sports Centre
- Date: 3 October 2023
- Competitors: 14 from 14 nations

Medalists
gold medal	Olga Zabelinskaya	Uzbekistan
silver medal	Eri Yonamine	Japan
bronze medal	Rinata Sultanova	Kazakhstan

The women's 18.3 kilometres road time trial competition at the 2022 Asian Games took place on 3 October 2023 in Chun'an Jieshou Sports Centre.

== Schedule ==
All times are China Standard Time (UTC+08:00)

Date	Time	Event
Tuesday, 3 October 2023	09:00	Final

== Results ==
Rank	Athlete	Time
1st place, gold medalist(s)	Olga Zabelinskaya (UZB)	24:35.99
2nd place, silver medalist(s)	Eri Yonamine (JPN)	25:35.59
3rd place, bronze medalist(s)	Rinata Sultanova (KAZ)	25:36.10
4	Leung Wing Yee (HKG)	25:50.36
5	Na Ah-reum (KOR)	25:56.08
6	Ayustina Delia Priatna (INA)	26:24.82
7	Wang Tingting (CHN)	26:26.44
8	Nguyễn Thị Thu Mai (VIE)	26:49.37
9	Safia Al-Sayegh (UAE)	27:09.89
10	Yulduz Hashimi (AFG)	27:14.00
11	Huang Ting-ying (TPE)	27:23.89
12	Phetdarin Somrat (THA)	28:13.75
13	Jinjiibadamyn Anujin (MGL)	28:42.51
14	Latefa Al-Yaseen (KUW)	30:32.55
