= Cycling at the 2014 Asian Games – Women's omnium =

Women's omnium at the 2014 Asian Games
- Venue: Incheon International Velodrome
- Date: 24–25 September 2014
- Competitors: 6 from 6 nations

Medalists
gold medal	Hsiao Mei-yu	Chinese Taipei
silver medal	Luo Xiaoling	China
bronze medal	Na Ah-reum	South Korea

The women's omnium competition at the 2014 Asian Games was held on 24 and 25 September 2014 at the Incheon International Velodrome.

== Schedule ==
All times are Korea Standard Time (UTC+09:00)

Date	Time	Event
Wednesday, 24 September 2014	16:00	Scratch race
Wednesday, 24 September 2014	16:56	Individual pursuit
Wednesday, 24 September 2014	18:02	Elimination race
Thursday, 25 September 2014	10:24	500m time trial
Thursday, 25 September 2014	16:06	Flying lap
Thursday, 25 September 2014	16:57	Points race

== Results ==
=== Scratch race ===
Rank	Athlete	Laps down	Points
1	Luo Xiaoling (CHN)		40
2	Hsiao Mei-yu (TPE)		38
3	Na Ah-reum (KOR)		36
4	Sakura Tsukagoshi (JPN)		34
5	Diao Xiaojuan (HKG)		32
6	Jupha Somnet (MAS)		30

=== Individual pursuit ===
Rank	Athlete	Time	Points
1	Na Ah-reum (KOR)	3:48.461	40
2	Luo Xiaoling (CHN)	3:50.251	38
3	Hsiao Mei-yu (TPE)	3:50.594	36
4	Diao Xiaojuan (HKG)	3:51.711	34
5	Sakura Tsukagoshi (JPN)	3:52.368	32
6	Jupha Somnet (MAS)	4:01.395	30

=== Elimination race ===
Rank	Athlete	Points
1	Hsiao Mei-yu (TPE)	40
2	Sakura Tsukagoshi (JPN)	38
3	Luo Xiaoling (CHN)	36
4	Diao Xiaojuan (HKG)	34
5	Jupha Somnet (MAS)	32
6	Na Ah-reum (KOR)	30

=== 500m time trial ===
Rank	Athlete	Time	Points
1	Hsiao Mei-yu (TPE)	35.649	40
2	Luo Xiaoling (CHN)	36.809	38
3	Sakura Tsukagoshi (JPN)	36.941	36
4	Na Ah-reum (KOR)	37.573	34
5	Diao Xiaojuan (HKG)	37.668	32
6	Jupha Somnet (MAS)	37.799	30

=== Flying lap ===
Rank	Athlete	Time	Points
1	Hsiao Mei-yu (TPE)	19.586	40
2	Luo Xiaoling (CHN)	19.797	38
3	Diao Xiaojuan (HKG)	19.816	36
4	Sakura Tsukagoshi (JPN)	20.052	34
5	Na Ah-reum (KOR)	20.710	32
6	Jupha Somnet (MAS)	20.755	30

=== Points race ===
Rank	Athlete	Sprint												Laps		Total	Finish order
Rank	Athlete	1	2	3	4	5	6	7	8	9	10	11	12	+	−	Total	Finish order
1	Hsiao Mei-yu (TPE)	5	1		5		5	5	2	5	3	1	1			33	4
2	Na Ah-reum (KOR)		3	2	2	5	2	3	3	2	5	5				32	5
3	Jupha Somnet (MAS)	1		3		3	3		5	3			5			23	1
4	Luo Xiaoling (CHN)	3	5	5	3	1		1		1	1	3				23	6
5	Diao Xiaojuan (HKG)		2					2			2	2	3			11	2
6	Sakura Tsukagoshi (JPN)	2		1	1	2	1		1				2			10	3

=== Summary ===
Rank	Athlete	Scratch race	Ind. pursuit	Elim. race	Time trial	Flying lap	Points race	Total
1st place, gold medalist(s)	Hsiao Mei-yu (TPE)	38	36	40	40	40	33	227
2nd place, silver medalist(s)	Luo Xiaoling (CHN)	40	38	36	38	38	23	213
3rd place, bronze medalist(s)	Na Ah-reum (KOR)	36	40	30	34	32	32	204
4	Sakura Tsukagoshi (JPN)	34	32	38	36	34	10	184
5	Diao Xiaojuan (HKG)	32	34	34	32	36	11	179
6	Jupha Somnet (MAS)	30	30	32	30	30	23	175
