= Cycling at the 2026 Asian Games – Women's omnium =

Women's omnium at the 2026 Asian Games
- Venue: Izu Velodrome
- Dates: 2 October 2026
- Competitors: 13 from 13 nations

Medalists
gold medal	Yumi Kajihara	Japan
silver medal	Rinata Sultanova	Kazakhstan
bronze medal	Lee Sze Wing	Hong Kong

The women's omnium event at the 2026 Asian Games was held on 2 October 2026.

== Schedule ==
Date	Time	Event
Friday, 2 October 2026	10:00	Scratch race
Friday, 2 October 2026	10:57	Tempo race
Friday, 2 October 2026	15:25	Elimination race
Friday, 2 October 2026	17:21	Points race

== Results ==
Legend

- DNF — Did not finish
- DNS — Did not start

=== Scratch race ===
Rank	Athlete	Laps down	Points
1	Yumi Kajihara (JPN)		40
2	Rinata Sultanova (KAZ)		38
3	Lee Sze Wing (HKG)		36
4	Chen Ning (CHN)		34
5	Huang Ting-ying (TPE)		32
6	Nafosat Kozieva (UZB)		30
7	Valencia Tan (SGP)		28
8	Jutatip Maneephan (THA)		26
9	Shin Ji-eun (KOR)		24
10	Ayustina Delia Priatna (INA)		22
11	Au Hoi Ian (MAC)		20
12	Harshita Jakhar (IND)		18
13	Samah Khaled (JOR)		16

=== Tempo race ===
Rank	Athlete	Sprints won	Laps		Total	Finish order	Points
Rank	Athlete	Sprints won	+	−	Total	Finish order	Points
1	Lee Sze Wing (HKG)	3, 10, 13, 14, 15, 16, 17, 18, 28, 31			10	5	40
2	Yumi Kajihara (JPN)	7, 11, 20, 22, 24, 27, 30			7	3	38
3	Nafosat Kozieva (UZB)	1, 6, 26, 33, 36			5	1	36
4	Rinata Sultanova (KAZ)	12, 21, 23, 25, 29			5	2	34
5	Chen Ning (CHN)	9, 32, 34, 35			4	4	32
6	Huang Ting-ying (TPE)	2, 19			2	7	30
7	Shin Ji-eun (KOR)	8			1	8	28
8	Valencia Tan (SGP)				0	9	26
9	Ayustina Delia Priatna (INA)	4		20	–19	6	24
10	Au Hoi Ian (MAC)			40	DNF		–18
11	Harshita Jakhar (IND)			40	DNF		–20
12	Jutatip Maneephan (THA)	5		40	DNF		–22
13	Samah Khaled (JOR)			40	DNF		–24

=== Elimination race ===
Rank	Athlete	Points
1	Yumi Kajihara (JPN)	40
2	Nafosat Kozieva (UZB)	38
3	Lee Sze Wing (HKG)	36
4	Chen Ning (CHN)	34
5	Rinata Sultanova (KAZ)	32
6	Shin Ji-eun (KOR)	30
7	Huang Ting-ying (TPE)	28
8	Valencia Tan (SGP)	26
9	Jutatip Maneephan (THA)	24
10	Ayustina Delia Priatna (INA)	22
11	Au Hoi Ian (MAC)	20
12	Harshita Jakhar (IND)	18
13	Samah Khaled (JOR)	16

=== Points race ===
Rank	Athlete	Sprint								Laps		Total	Finish order
Rank	Athlete	1	2	3	4	5	6	7	8	+	−	Total	Finish order
1	Rinata Sultanova (KAZ)			2		5	5	5	10			27	1
2	Chen Ning (CHN)	3	2	3		3	2	2	6			21	2
3	Yumi Kajihara (JPN)	5	5	5	3	1		1				20	8
4	Lee Sze Wing (HKG)		3		2		3		4			12	3
5	Shin Ji-eun (KOR)	1			5			3	2			11	4
6	Nafosat Kozieva (UZB)	2	1	1	1	2						7	10
7	Valencia Tan (SGP)							1				1	5
8	Ayustina Delia Priatna (INA)											0	6
9	Huang Ting-ying (TPE)											0	7
10	Au Hoi Ian (MAC)										20	–20	9
11	Harshita Jakhar (IND)										20	–20	12
12	Jutatip Maneephan (THA)										60	–60	11
13	Samah Khaled (JOR)											ABD	

=== Summary ===
Rank	Athlete	Scratch race	Tempo race	Elim. race	Points race	Total
1st place, gold medalist(s)	Yumi Kajihara (JPN)	38	38	40	20	136
2nd place, silver medalist(s)	Rinata Sultanova (KAZ)	40	34	32	27	133
3rd place, bronze medalist(s)	Lee Sze Wing (HKG)	36	40	36	12	124
4	Chen Ning (CHN)	34	32	34	21	121
5	Nafosat Kozieva (UZB)	30	36	38	7	111
6	Shin Ji-eun (KOR)	24	28	30	11	93
7	Huang Ting-ying (TPE)	32	30	28	0	90
8	Valencia Tan (SGP)	28	26	26	1	81
9	Ayustina Delia Priatna (INA)	22	24	22	0	68
10	Au Hoi Ian (MAC)	20	–18	20	–20	2
11	Harshita Jakhar (IND)	18	–20	18	–20	–4
12	Jutatip Maneephan (THA)	26	–22	24	–60	–32
—	Samah Khaled (JOR)	16	–24	16	ABD	DNF
