= Tseng Hsiao-chia =

Taiwanese cyclist

Personal information
- Full name: Tseng Hsiao-chia
- Born: 21 June 1987 (age 39) Taiwan

Cycling career
- Sport: Cycling
- Current team: Retired
- Discipline: Road
- Role: Rider

Tseng Hsiao-chia (born 21 June 1987) is a Taiwanese former road cyclist, who represented her nation at the 2011 UCI Road World Championships.

== Major results ==
2004
Asian Junior Road Championships

5th Road race
7th Time trial

2009
7th Road race, East Asian Games
2011
7th Time trial, Asian Road Championships
2014
1st Individual pursuit, Taiwan Hsin-Chu Track International Classic
Hong Kong International Track Cup

2nd Points race
2nd Scratch
3rd Individual pursuit

Hong Kong International Track Cup

2nd Scratch
3rd Omnium

3rd Team pursuit, Asian Games (with Hsiao Mei-yu, Huang Ting-ying & Ju I Fang)
3rd Scratch, Asian Track Championships
4th Time trial, Asian Road Championships
2015
1st Omnium, Yangyang International Track Competition
Taiwan Hsin-Chu Track International Classic

1st Individual pursuit
1st Scratch
3rd Omnium

2nd Points race, Japan Track Cup
5th Time trial, Asian Road Championships
