= Rinata Sultanova =

Kazakhstani cyclist (born 1998)

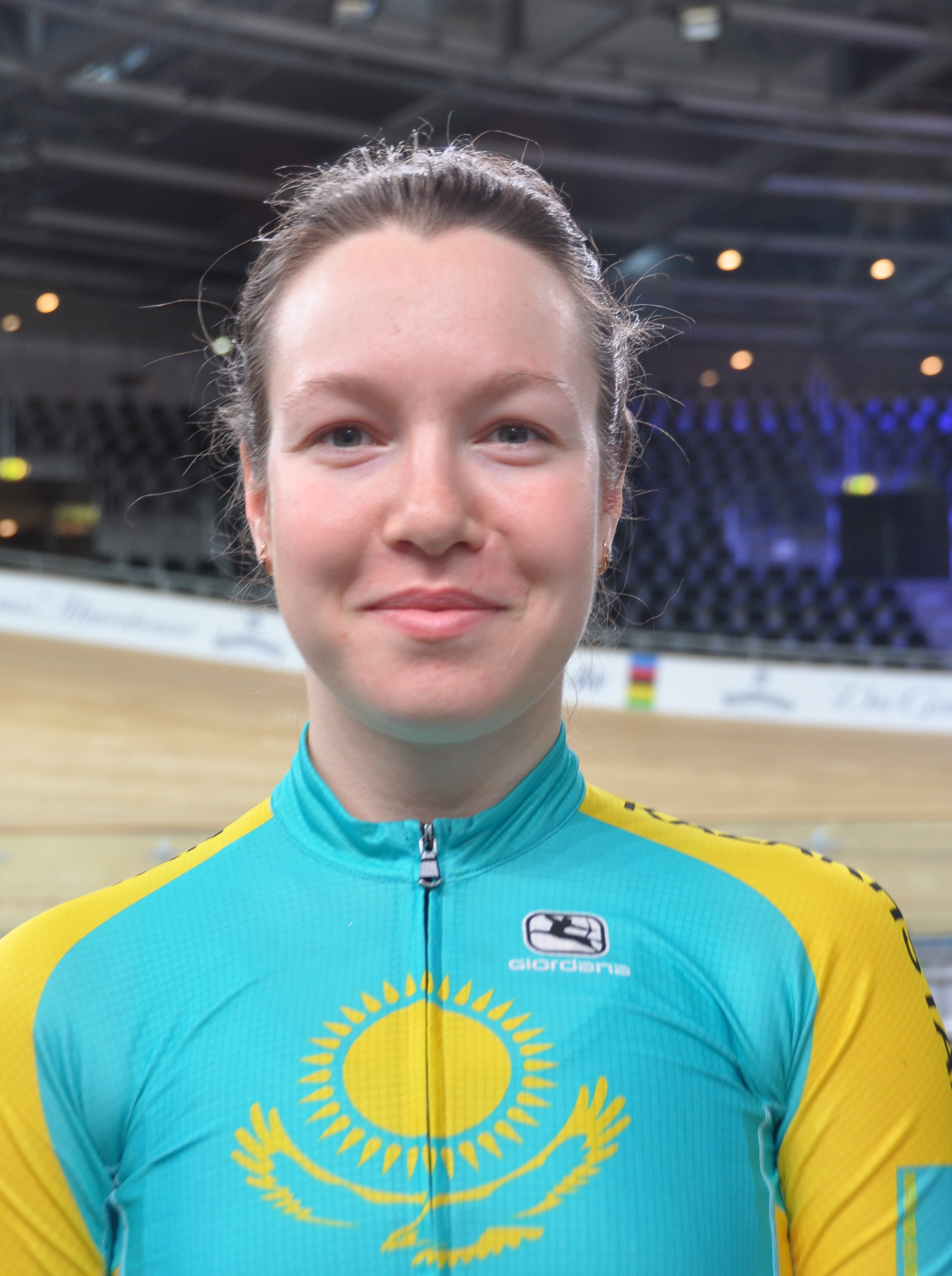

Personal information
- Born: 17 March 1998 (age 28)

Cycling career
- Sport: Cycling
- Disciplines: Road cycling Track cycling
Medal record
Representing Kazakhstan
Women's track cycling
Asian Games
Silver medal – second place	2026 Aichi–Nagoya	Omnium
Asian Championships
Silver medal – second place	2020 Jincheon	Scratch
Silver medal – second place	2022 New Delhi	Team pursuit
Bronze medal – third place	2022 New Delhi	Omnium
Bronze medal – third place	2024 New Delhi	Individual pursuit
Bronze medal – third place	2026 Tagaytay	Individual pursuit
Islamic Solidarity Games
Gold medal – first place	2021 Konya	Individual pursuit
Gold medal – first place	2021 Konya	Scratch
Gold medal – first place	2021 Konya	Omnium
Women's road bicycle racing
Asian Games
Gold medal – first place	2026 Aichi–Nagoya	Time trial
Bronze medal – third place	2022 Hangzhou	Time trial
Asian Championships
Gold medal – first place	2024 Almaty	Mixed team relay
Gold medal – first place	2025 Phitsanulok	Mixed team relay
Bronze medal – third place	2024 Almaty	Time trial
Islamic Solidarity Games
Bronze medal – third place	2021 Konya	Time trial

Rinata Sultanova (Рината Станиславовна Сұлтанова, born 17 March 1998) is a Kazakhstani cyclist. She won the gold medal in the women's individual pursuit, women's scratch and women's omnium events at the 2021 Islamic Solidarity Games held in Konya, Turkey.

Sultanova won the silver medal in the women's scratch event at the 2020 Asian Track Cycling Championships held in South Korea. She competed in the women's scratch and women's omnium events at the 2020 UCI Track Cycling World Championships held in Berlin, Germany. She also competed in the women's elimination and women's omnium events at the 2021 UCI Track Cycling World Championships held in Roubaix, France.

In 2022, she won medals at the Asian Road Cycling Championships held in Dushanbe, Tajikistan and at the Asian Track Cycling Championships held in New Delhi, India.
