= Cycling at the 2014 Asian Games – Women's team sprint =

Women's team sprint at the 2014 Asian Games
- Venue: Incheon International Velodrome
- Date: 20 September 2014
- Competitors: 14 from 7 nations

Medalists
gold medal	Gong Jinjie; Zhong Tianshi	China
silver medal	Kim Won-gyeong; Lee Hye-jin	South Korea
bronze medal	Hsiao Mei-yu; Huang Ting-ying	Chinese Taipei

The women's team sprint competition at the 2014 Asian Games was held on 20 September at the Incheon International Velodrome.

== Schedule ==
All times are Korea Standard Time (UTC+09:00)

Date	Time	Event
Saturday, 20 September 2014	16:00	Qualifying
Saturday, 20 September 2014	18:40	Finals

== Results ==
=== Qualifying ===
Rank	Team	Time
1	China (CHN); Gong Jinjie; Zhong Tianshi	43.461
2	South Korea (KOR); Kim Won-gyeong; Lee Hye-jin	44.812
3	Japan (JPN); Kayono Maeda; Takako Ishii	45.873
4	Chinese Taipei (TPE); Hsiao Mei-yu; Huang Ting-ying	46.612
5	Malaysia (MAS); Fatehah Mustapa; Jupha Somnet	46.988
6	Hong Kong (HKG); Meng Zhaojuan; Diao Xiaojuan	47.391
7	India (IND); Kezia Varghese; Deborah Herold	48.908

=== Finals ===
==== Bronze ====
Rank	Team	Time
3rd place, bronze medalist(s)	Chinese Taipei (TPE); Hsiao Mei-yu; Huang Ting-ying	45.389
4	Japan (JPN); Kayono Maeda; Takako Ishii	45.926

==== Gold ====
Rank	Team	Time
1st place, gold medalist(s)	China (CHN); Gong Jinjie; Zhong Tianshi	43.774
2nd place, silver medalist(s)	South Korea (KOR); Kim Won-gyeong; Lee Hye-jin	44.876
