= China Continental Team of Gansu Bank =

Chinese cycling team

Team information
- UCI code: GCB
- Registered: China
- Founded: 2012
- Discipline: Road
- Status: UCI Continental

Key personnel
- General manager: Ren Wen
- Team managers: Jiao Pengda; Zhang Jiade

Team name history
- 2012–2014 2015–: Gan Su Sports Lottery Cycling Team; China Continental Team of Gansu Bank

China Continental Team of Gansu Bank is a Chinese UCI Continental cycling team established in 2012.

== Team roster ==
As of 6 February 2021.

Rider	Date of birth
Cai Xin (CHN)	22 April 1999 (age 27)
Li Bo (CHN)	28 December 1997 (age 28)
Nan Yongjie (CHN)	8 July 2001 (age 25)
Peng Xin (CHN)	27 March 2000 (age 26)
Qi Junshan (CHN)	9 October 1996 (age 29)

Rider	Date of birth
Qiang Shuhua (CHN)	29 April 2000 (age 26)
Song Mingliang (CHN)	2 May 1996 (age 30)
Sun Yupeng (CHN)	3 August 1998 (age 28)
Wang Zhen (CHN)	26 June 1989 (age 37)
Wei Kongqing (CHN)	1 May 2000 (age 26)

== Major wins ==
2020
Overall Tour of Taiyuan, Peng Xin

Stage 6, Peng Xin
