= Lee Joo-hee =

South Korean cyclist (born 1991)

Lee Joohee
Personal information
- Born: 13 August 1991 (age 35)

Cycling career
- Sport: Cycling
- Discipline: Track cycling
- Role: Rider
Medal record
Representing South Korea
Women's track cycling
Asian Championships
Bronze medal – third place	2016 Izu	team pursuit

Lee Joohee (born 13 August 1991) is a South Korean female track cyclist. She won the bronze medal in the team pursuit at the 2016 Asian Cycling Championships.
