= Pu Yixian =

Chinese cyclist

Personal information
- Full name: Pu Yixian
- Born: 23 December 1992 (age 33)

Cycling career
- Sport: Cycling
- Discipline: Road
- Role: Rider

Professional team
- 2016–2020: China Chongming–Liv–Champion System
Medal record
Representing China
Women's road cycling
Asian Championships
Silver medal – second place	2016 Izu	road race

Pu Yixian (Chinese: 普译娴; born 23 December 1992) is a Chinese road cyclist, who most recently rode for UCI Women's Continental Team China Liv Pro Cycling. She won the silver medal in the road race at the 2016 Asian Cycling Championships.
