= Luo Xiaoling =

Chinese cyclist (born 1988)

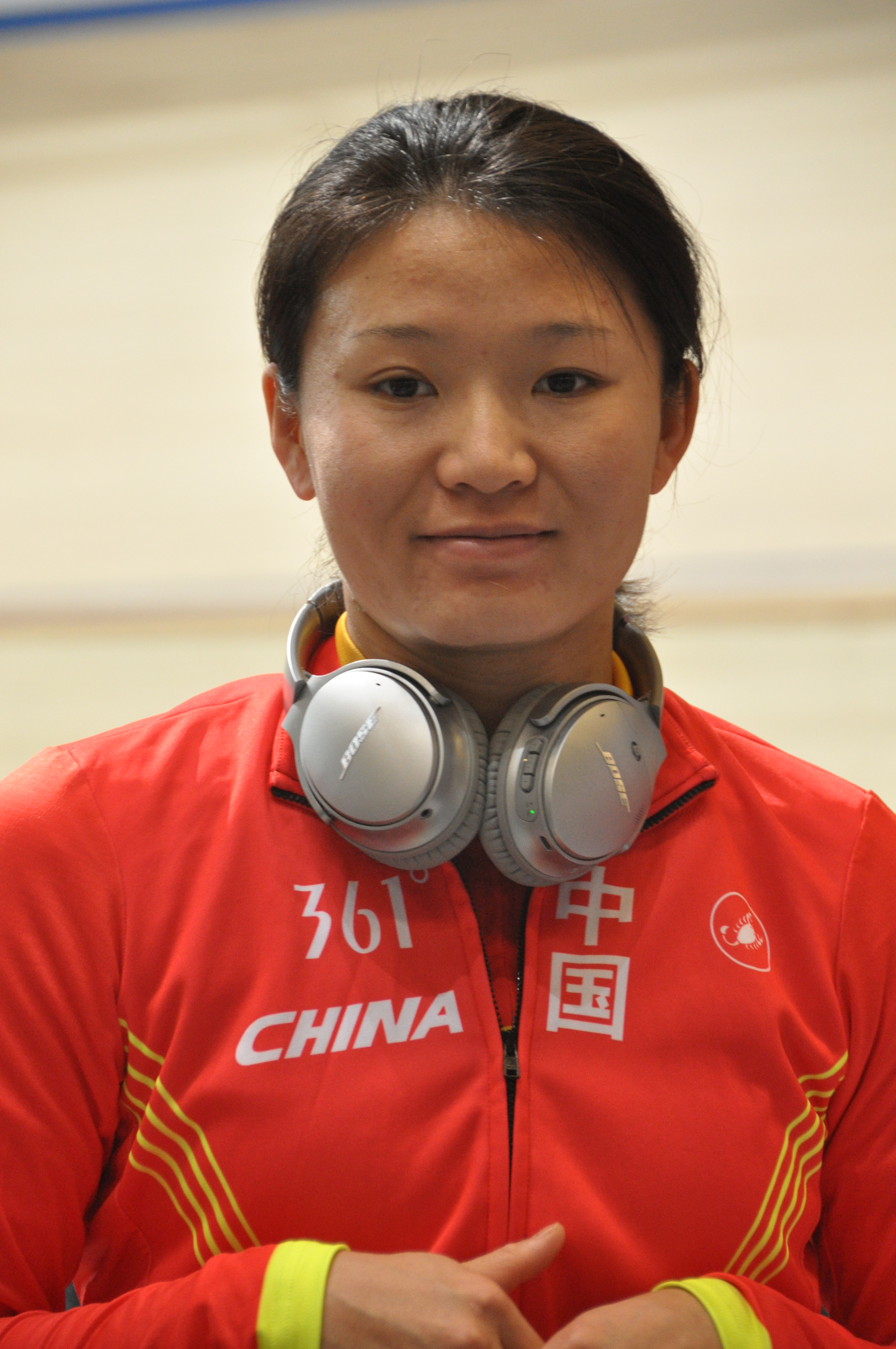
- Luo Xiaoling (2016)

Personal information
- Born: 20 September 1988 (age 38) Gansu, China

Cycling career
- Sport: Cycling
- Role: Rider

Luo Xiaoling (Chinese: 罗晓玲; pinyin: Luo Xiaoling, born 20 September 1988) is a Chinese professional racing cyclist. She rides for China Chongming-Liv-Champion System Pro Cycling. She is from Gansu. She also competed at the 2014 Asian Games.

== Major results ==
2012
10th Road race, Asian Road Championships
2014
1st Omnium, Asian Track Championships
1st Omnium, Hong Kong International Track Cup
1st Omnium, China Track Cup
2nd Omnium, Asian Games
2015
1st Omnium, Asian Track Championships
2nd Omnium, South Australian Grand Prix
2nd Omnium, Super Drome Cup
9th Overall The Princess Maha Chackri Sirindhon's Cup
2016
1st Omnium, Asian Track Championships
2017
Asian Track Championships

1st Team pursuit (with Chen Qiaolin, Chen Siyu and Huang Dongyan)
2nd Omnium

== See also ==
- List of 2015 UCI Women's Teams and riders
