= Kisato Nakamura =

Japanese cyclist

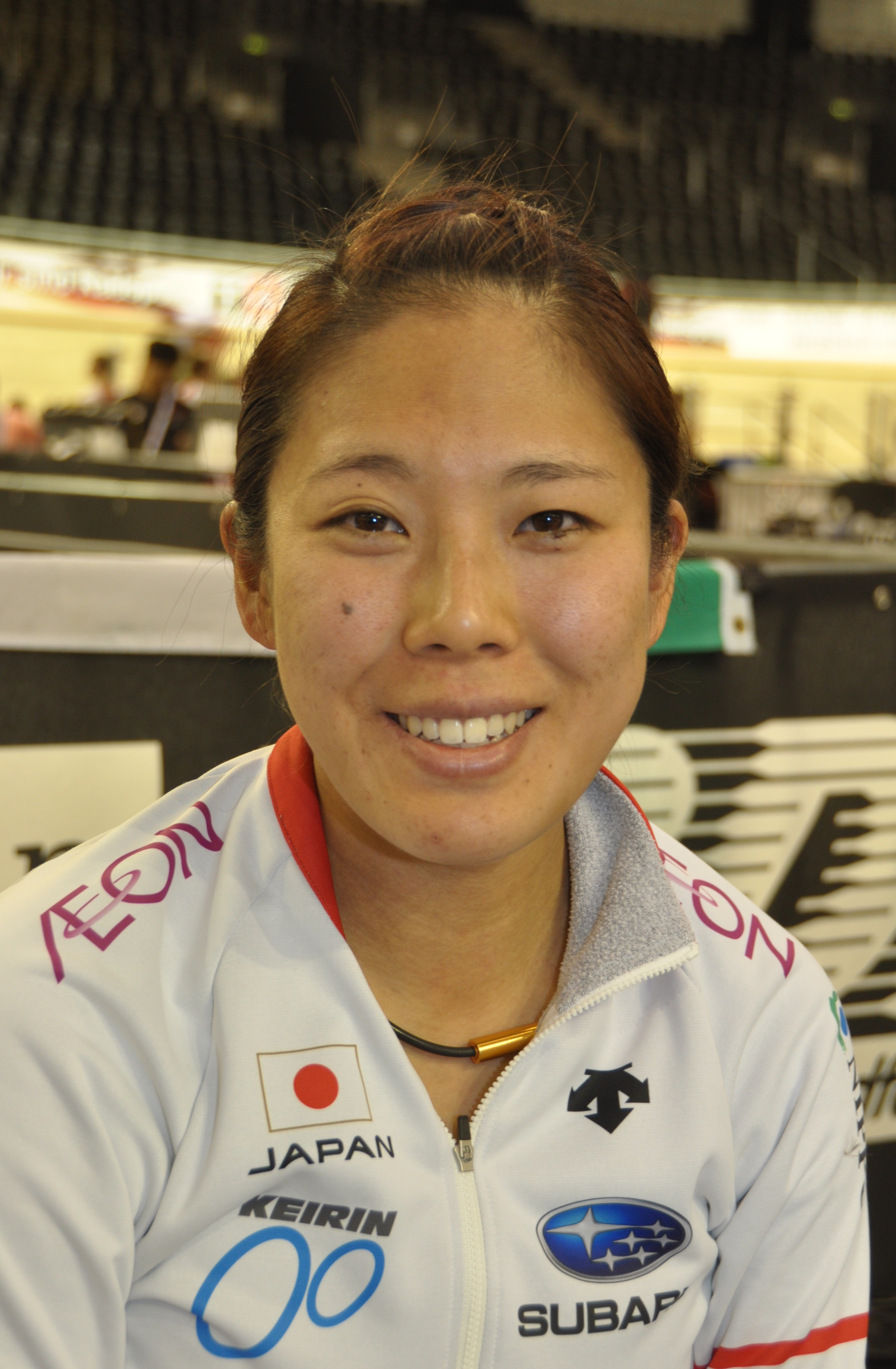
- Nakamura in 2018

Personal information
- Born: 7 January 1993 (age 33)

Cycling career
- Sport: Cycling
- Discipline: Track cycling
- Role: Rider
Medal record
Women's track cycling
Representing Japan
Asian Games
| Bronze medal – third place | 2018 Jakarta-Palembang | Team pursuit |
Asian Championships
| Gold medal – first place | 2014 Astana | Points race |
| Gold medal – first place | 2018 Nilai | Madison |
| Gold medal – first place | 2018 Nilai | Team pursuit |
| Silver medal – second place | 2016 Izu | Team pursuit |
| Silver medal – second place | 2019 Jakarta | Team pursuit |
| Bronze medal – third place | 2015 Nakhon Ratchasima | Team pursuit |
| Bronze medal – third place | 2020 Jincheon | Team pursuit |

Kisato Nakamura (中村妃智, born 7 January 1993) is a Japanese track cyclist. She won a silver medal in the team pursuit at the 2016 Asian Cycling Championships.

She qualified to represent Japan at the 2020 Summer Olympics.

== Major results ==
2014
1st Points Race, Asian Track Championships
3rd Points Race, Japan Track Cup 1
2015
3rd Points Race, Japan Track Cup
3rd Team Pursuit, Asian Track Championships (with Kanako Kase, Sakura Tsukagoshi and Minami Uwano)
2016
2nd Team Pursuit, Asian Track Championships (with Yumi Kajihara, Sakura Tsukagoshi and Minami Uwano)
2017
3rd Points Race, National Track Championships
