= Chan Chun Hing =

Hong Kong cyclist (born 1981)

Chun Hing Chan
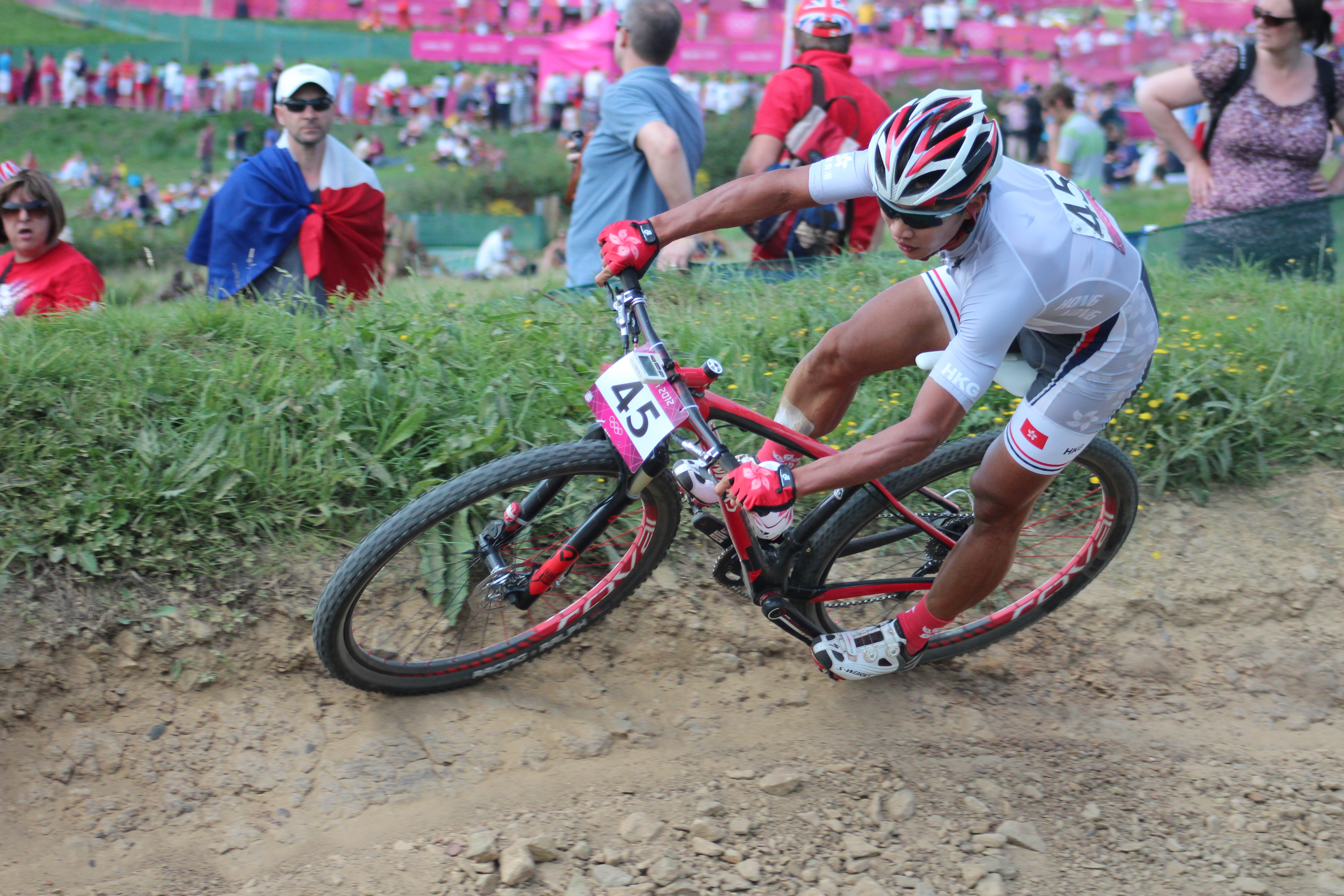
- Chun in 2012

Personal information
- Full name: Chun Hing Chan
- Born: 24 April 1981 (age 45) British Hong Kong
- Height: 170 cm (5 ft 7 in)
- Weight: 70 kg (154 lb)

Cycling career
- Sport: Cycling
- Current team: Retired
- Disciplines: Mountain biking; Road
- Role: Rider

Professional teams
- 2005–2007: Purapharm
- 2014–2016: HKSI Pro Cycling Team

Major wins
- Men's Cross-Country, 2010 Asian Games
Medal record
Men's mountain bike racing
Representing Hong Kong
Asian Games
| Gold medal – first place | 2010 Guangzhou | Cross-country |

Chun Hing Chan (Chinese: 陳振興; Jyutping: can^{4} zan^{3} hing^{3}; born 24 April 1981) MH is a Hong Kong former professional racing cyclist. He specialised in cross-country mountain biking although he also participated in road races.

== Early years ==
Chan was born on 24 April 1981 in British Hong Kong. He grew up in Fanling with his parents and five older siblings. Chan went to Kei San Secondary School, where he took up downhill mountain biking at Form 2. After graduating from the Hong Kong Institute of Vocational Education, Chan trained part-time as a road cyclist and took up a job in the telecom industry for two years. In 2002 at the age of 21, Chan decided to quit his job and became a full-time athlete and turned his focus into cross-country mountain biking. Chan was coached by Jinkang Shen (Chinese: 沈金康).

== Career ==
In his early professional years, Chan competed in both cross-country mountain biking and road cycling. Chan won gold in the 2003 China National Mountain Bike Championship and also in the 2005 China National Road Cycling Championships. In 2006, Chan won silver at the Asian Mountain Bike Championship, an event that he finished third in the subsequent three years (2007, 2008 and 2009). In 2007, Chan won a bronze medal in the individual road race 196 km event at the Asian Cycling Championships.

Chan competed in the 2009 Chinese National Games and won a silver medal in cross-country mountain biking. This performance brought him to the fore and Chan blazed to gold in the cross-country mountain bike race at the 16th Asian Games in 2010, crossing the finish line at 2 hours 11 minutes and 33 seconds and beating his main rival Japanese rider Kohei Yamamoto. Chan's performance has impressed the Hong Kong cycling hierarchy, and he received the Hong Kong Potential Sports Stars Awards for 2010. In 2011, Chan won gold in the China National Mountain Bike Championship, and he also received the Medal of Honour from the Hong Kong Government in 2011 for his outstanding achievements in international cycling competitions.

Chan took part in the 2012 London Olympics. He participated in the cross-country cycling race. Chan eventually finished in 38th place (out of 50 competitors) with a time of 1 hour 41 minutes and 59 seconds.

Chan competed for Hong Kong at the 2016 Summer Olympics in Rio de Janeiro in the mountain biking cross-country race. He finished in 32nd place with a time of 1 hour 44 minutes and 41 seconds. He was the flag bearer for Hong Kong during the closing ceremony. Chan retired from racing after the 2016 Summer Olympics. Chan became a cycling coach after his retirement. He has also set up companies organising mountain bike racing competitions and bicycle touring.

== Personal life ==
Although Chan grew up on a farm, he is afraid of snakes. Chan married Sin Ying Leung (Chinese: 梁倩影), a former Hong Kong A1 Division Championship basketball player and former ATV sports news presenter, in 2012. As of 2016, the couple has one son together.

== Major results ==
2003
1st Cross-country, China National Mountain Bike Championships
2005
1st Road race, China National Road Cycling Championships
2006
2nd Cross-country, Asian Mountain Bike Championships
2007
3rd Cross-country, Asian Mountain Bike Championships
3rd Road race, Asian Cycling Championships
2008
3rd Cross-country, Asian Mountain Bike Championships
2009
3rd Cross-country, Asian Mountain Bike Championships
2nd Cross-country, Chinese National Games
2010
1st Cross-country, Asian Games
2011
1st Cross-country, China National Mountain Bike Championships

Awards
| Preceded by Yuk Ming Kwong; Tsz Hei Li; Yvette Man-Yi Kong; Tsz Ka Kaka Chan | Hong Kong Potential Sports Stars Awards; 2010; With: Hau Wah Brenda Chan; Tsun Sang Lee; Wai Sze Lee | Succeeded by Ngan Yi Cheung; Ching Ching Yu; Chin To Wong; Hiu Lam Cheng; In Kwan Lau; Kwan Hoi Lok; Perry Wong; Tsz Hong Lau |
