= Hsiao Mei-yu =

Taiwanese cyclist (born 1985)

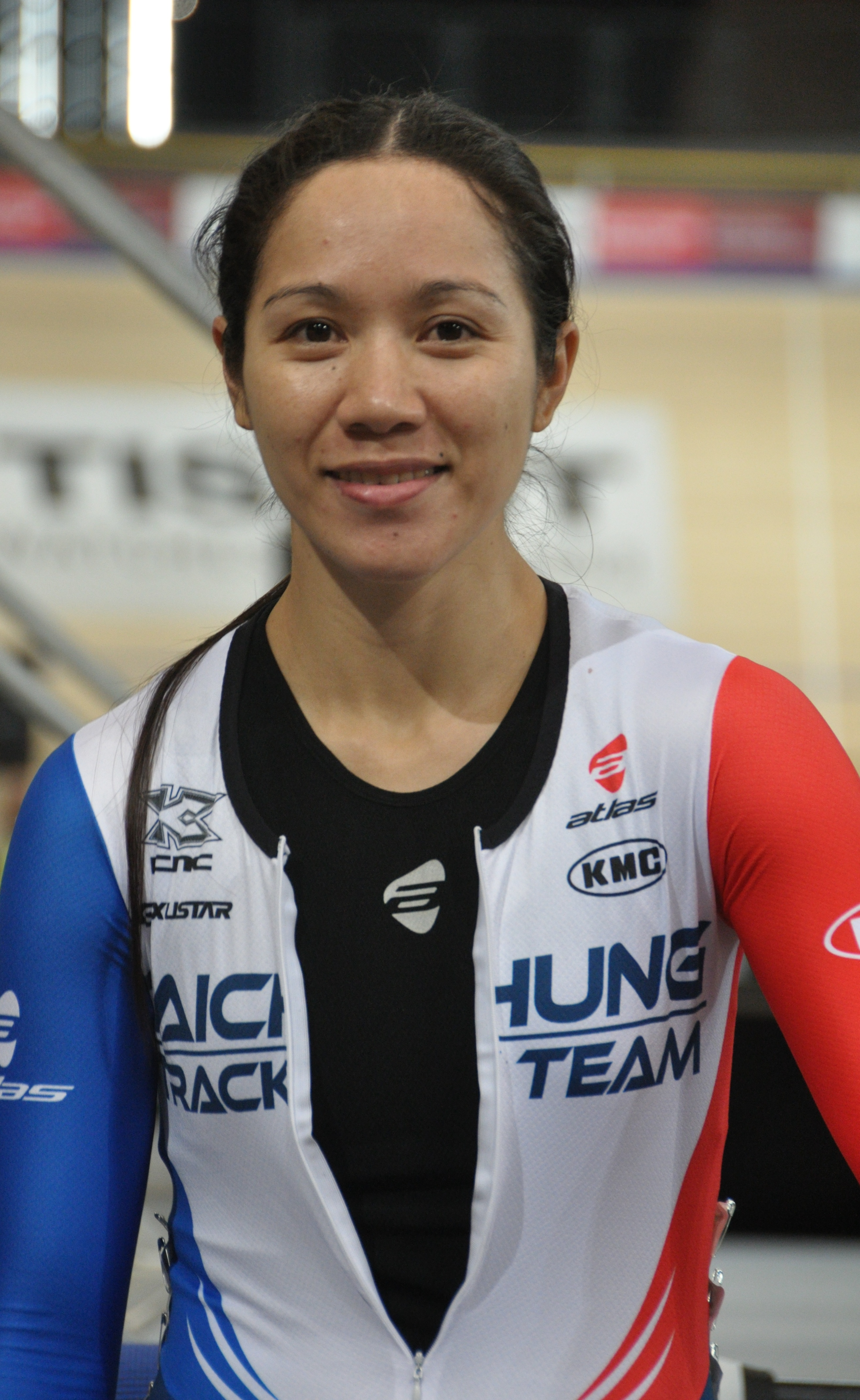
- Hsiao in 2016

Personal information
- Full name: Hsiao Mei-yu
- Born: 7 January 1985 (age 41) Fengyuan, Taichung, Taiwan
- Height: 5 ft 3 1/2 in (161 cm)
- Weight: 53 kg (117 lb)

Cycling career
- Sport: Cycling
- Disciplines: Track; Road
- Role: Rider

Professional teams
- 2010–2011: Action Cycling Team
- 2012: Axman Team Taiwan
- 2016–2017: Taichung Cycling Team
Medal record
Representing Chinese Taipei
Women's cycling
Asian Games
Gold medal – first place	2010 Guangzhou	Road race
Gold medal – first place	2014 Incheon	Omnium
Bronze medal – third place	2014 Incheon	Team pursuit
Bronze medal – third place	2014 Incheon	Team sprint
Bronze medal – third place	2014 Incheon	Road race
Asian Cycling Championships
Bronze medal – third place	2006 Kuala Lumpur	Keirin
Silver medal – second place	2009 Tenggarong	Road race
Bronze medal – third place	2009 Tenggarong	Omnium
Bronze medal – third place	2010 Sharjah	Omnium
Bronze medal – third place	2010 Sharjah	Team pursuit
Gold medal – first place	2011 Nakhon Ratchasima	Road race
Gold medal – first place	2012 Kuala Lumpur	Road race
Gold medal – first place	2013 New Delhi	Road race
Gold medal – first place	2014 Astana	Road race
Silver medal – second place	2015 Nakhon Ratchasima	Road race

Hsiao Mei-yu (Chinese: 蕭美玉; born 7 January 1985 in Taichung, Taiwan) is a Taiwanese road and track bicycle racer. She participated in the 2006 and 2010 Asian Games. In 2010, she won a gold medal at the women's road race event. In the 2012 Summer Olympics in the Women's road race, she finished over the time limit, and competed in the women's omnium, placing 17th. Hsiao next participated in the 2014 Asian Games and won four medals, including a gold in the women's omnium.

In 2016, Hsiao returned to the Olympic Games in Rio de Janeiro to compete in the Cycling Track Women's Omnium event, where she received 64 points to place 17th, the same placement as at the London Olympics four years earlier. Her best omnium event was the time trial where she ranked seventh. She was the only competitor from Taiwan.

== Major results ==
=== Track ===
2006
3rd Keirin, Asian Track Championships
2009
3rd Omnium, Asian Track Championships
2010
Asian Track Championships

3rd Omnium
3rd Team pursuit

2014
Asian Games

1st Omnium
3rd Team pursuit (with Huang Ting-ying, Tseng Hsiao-chia & Ju I Fang)
3rd Team sprint (with Huang Ting-ying)

2nd Omnium, Asian Track Championships
2nd Omnium, Hong Kong International Track Cup
2nd Omnium, Taiwan Hsin-Chu Track International Classic
2015
Taiwan Hsin-Chu Track International Classic

1st Omnium
2nd Sprint

3rd Omnium, Asian Track Championships
3rd Omnium, Yangyang International Track Competition
2016
1st Omnium, ITS Melbourne Grand Prix
1st Omnium, ITS Melbourne DISC Grand Prix
2017
Asian Track Championships

2nd Omnium
3rd 500m time trial

2nd Omnium, China Track Cup

=== Road ===
2009
2nd Road race, Asian Road Championships
9th Road race, East Asian Games
2010
1st Road race, Asian Games
2011
1st Road race, Asian Road Championships
2012
1st Road race, Asian Road Championships
1st Stage 5 Vuelta a El Salvador
2013
1st Road race, Asian Road Championships
5th Overall Tour of Thailand

1st Points classification
1st Stage 3

2014
1st Road race, Asian Road Championships
3rd Road race, Asian Games
3rd Overall Tour of Thailand
2015
2nd Road race, Asian Road Championships
2019
2nd Road race, National Road Championships
