= Kanako Kase =

Japanese cyclist

Personal information
- Full name: Kanako Kase
- Born: 31 May 1980 (age 46) Nagaoka, Niigata, Japan
- Height: 1.64 m (5 ft 4 1/2 in)
- Weight: 66.8 kg (147 lb)

Cycling career
- Sport: Cycling
- Discipline: Track
- Role: Rider

Kanako Kase (加瀬 加奈子, Kase Kanako) (born 31 May 1980) is a Japanese professional racing cyclist. She rode at the 2015 UCI Track Cycling World Championships. She also competed at the 2014 Asian Games.

== Major results ==
2015
Japan Track Cup

2nd Keirin
2nd Sprint
3rd Sprint

3rd Team Pursuit, Asian Track Championships (with Kisato Nakamura, Sakura Tsukagoshi and Minami Uwano)
