= Hu Ke (cyclist) =

Chinese cyclist (born 1988)

Personal information
- Born: 16 October 1988 (age 38) Hong Kong

Cycling career
- Sport: Cycling
- Discipline: Track cycling
- Role: Rider
Medal record
Men's track cycling
Representing China
Asian Championships
Silver medal – second place	2016 Izu	team sprint

Hu Ke (born 16 October 1988) is a Chinese male track cyclist. He competed in the team sprint at the 2014 UCI Track Cycling World Championships and 2015 UCI Track Cycling World Championships. He won the silver medal in the team sprint at the 2016 Asian Cycling Championships.
