= Wang Zhen (cyclist) =

Chinese bicycle racer

Personal information
- Full name: Wang Zhen
- Born: 26 June 1989 (age 37)
- Height: 1.72 m (5 ft 8 in)
- Weight: 65 kg (143 lb)

Cycling career
- Sport: Cycling
- Disciplines: Road; Cross-country
- Role: Rider

Amateur team
- 2011: China 361° Cycling Team

Professional teams
- 2012–2014: Gan Su Sports Lottery Cycling Team
- 2015: Beijing Innova Cycling Team
- 2017–2019: China Continental Team of Gansu Bank
- 2021: China Continental Team of Gansu Bank
Medal record
| Gold medal – first place | 2014 Asian Games | Cross-Country Mountain Biking |

Wang Zhen (born 26 June 1989) is a Chinese cross-country mountain biker and road cyclist, who last rode for UCI Continental team China Continental Team of Gansu Bank. At the 2014 Asian Games, he won the gold medal in the men's cross-country mountain bike event at the Ganghwa Asiad BMX Track.
