= Park Keon-woo =

South Korean cyclist

Personal information
- Born: 18 July 1991 (age 35) South Korea

Korean name
- Hangul: 박건우
- RR: Bak Geonu
- MR: Pak Kŏnu

Sport
- Cycling career
- Full name: Park Keon-woo
- Sport: Cycling
- Current team: LX Cycling Team
- Disciplines: Road; Track
- Role: Rider

Professional teams
- 2014: RTS–Santic Racing Team
- 2016–: LX–IIBS Cycling Team

Park Keon-woo (Korean: 박건우; born 18 July 1991) is a South Korean road and track cyclist, who currently rides for UCI Continental team LX Cycling Team. At the 2012 Summer Olympics, he competed in the Men's team pursuit for the national team.

== Major results ==
2012
8th Overall Tour de Korea
2022
6th Overall Tour of Thailand
2023
1st Road race, National Road Championships
