= Minami Uwano =

Japanese cyclist

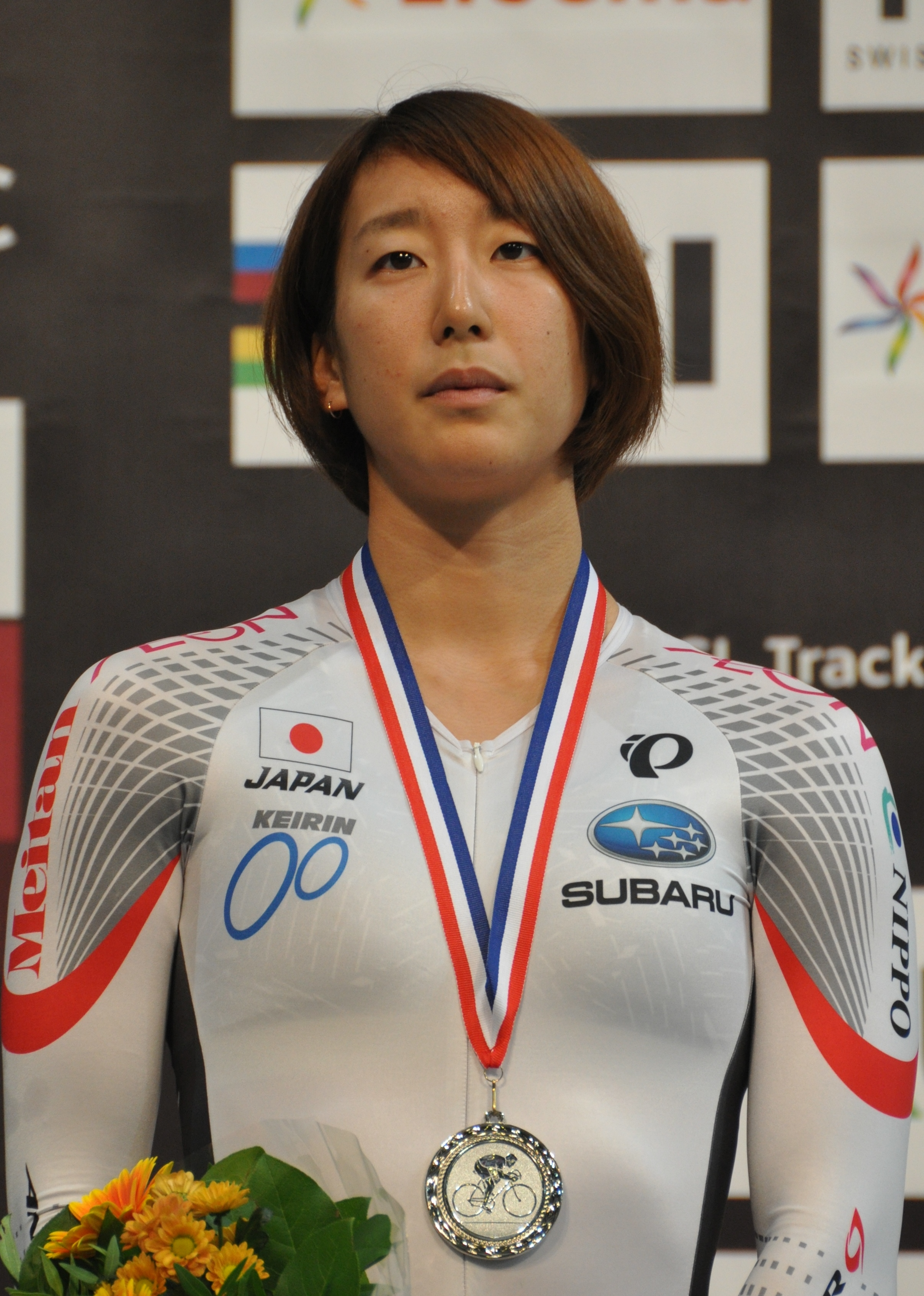
- Minami Uwano (2016)

Personal information
- Born: 18 May 1991 (age 35)

Cycling career
- Sport: Cycling
- Role: Rider
Medal record
World Championships
Silver medal – second place	2015 Yvelines	Points race

Minami Uwano (上野 みなみ, Uwano Minami; born 18 May 1991) is a Japanese racing cyclist. She competed in the 2013 UCI women's road race in Florence. At the 2015 UCI Track Cycling World Championships she won a silver medal in the points race. She competed at the 2010 and 2014 Asian Games.

== Major results ==
2015
1st Omnium, Japan Track Cup
3rd Team Pursuit, Asian Track Championships (with Kanako Kase, Kisato Nakamura and Sakura Tsukagoshi)
2016
1st Points Race, Japan Track Cup
Asian Cycling Championships

2nd Team Pursuit (with Yumi Kajihara, Kisato Nakamura and Sakura Tsukagoshi)
3rd Points Race
