= Huang Ting-ying =

Taiwanese cyclist (born 1990)

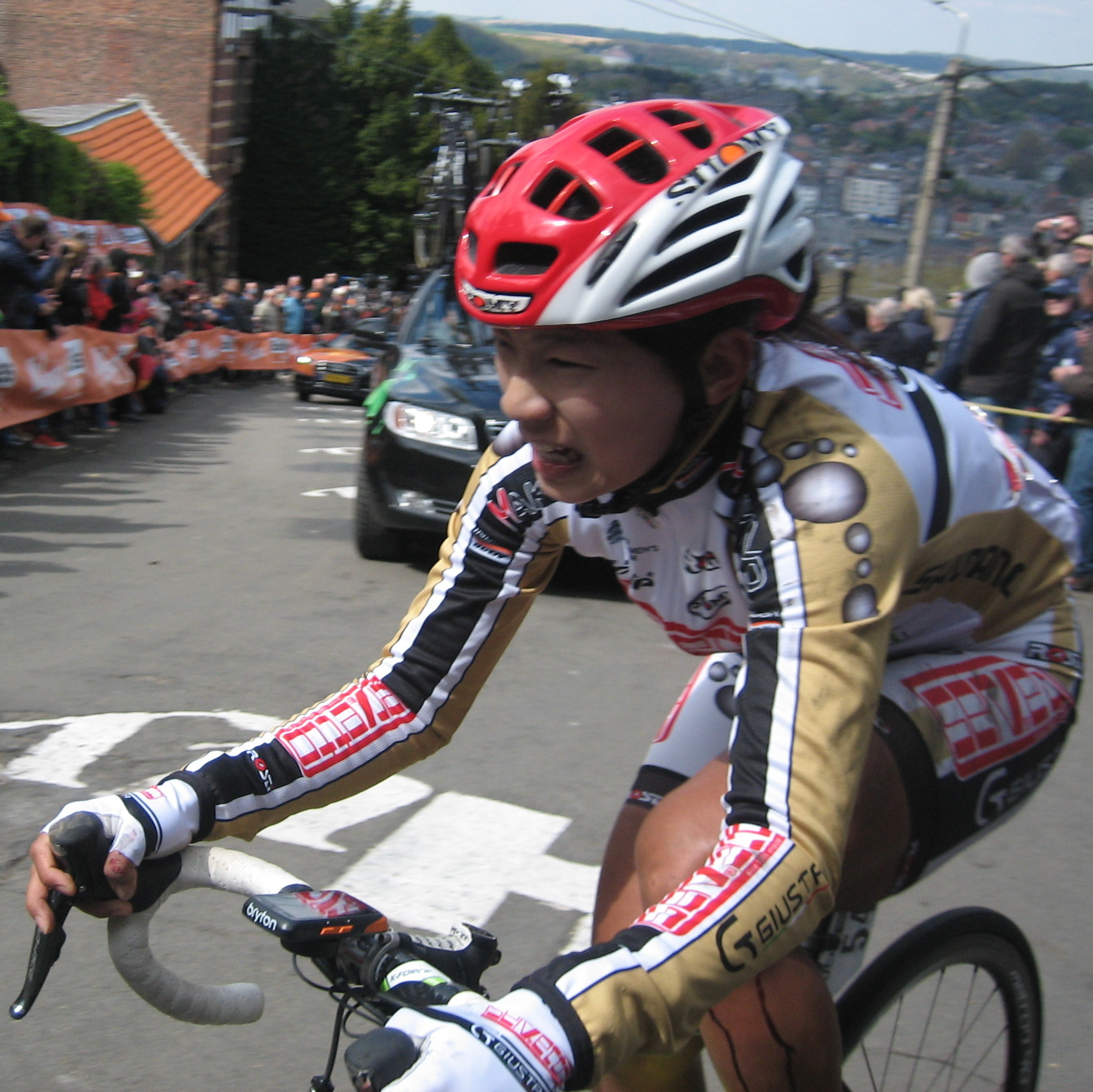
- Huang in 2017

Personal information
- Full name: Huang Ting-ying
- Born: 29 May 1990 (age 36) Kaohsiung, Taiwan

Cycling career
- Sport: Cycling
- Disciplines: Road; Track
- Role: Rider

Professional team
- 2016–2017: Servetto Footon
Medal record
Representing Chinese Taipei
Women's track cycling
Asian Games
Silver medal – second place	2018 Jakarta-Palembang	Omnium
Bronze medal – third place	2014 Incheon	Team sprint
Bronze medal – third place	2014 Incheon	Team pursuit
Bronze medal – third place	2018 Jakarta-Palembang	Individual pursuit
Asian Championships
Gold medal – first place	2015 Nakhon Ratchasima	Individual pursuit
Gold medal – first place	2015 Nakhon Ratchasima	Points race
Gold medal – first place	2015 Nakhon Ratchasima	Scratch
Gold medal – first place	2016 Izu	Individual pursuit
Gold medal – first place	2016 Izu	Points race
Gold medal – first place	2018 Nilai	Scratch
Gold medal – first place	2019 Jakarta	Scratch
Silver medal – second place	2008 Nara	Team sprint
Silver medal – second place	2009 Tenggarong	Team sprint
Silver medal – second place	2010 Sharjah	Team sprint
Silver medal – second place	2016 Izu	Scratch
Silver medal – second place	2018 Nilai	Individual pursuit
Silver medal – second place	2019 Jakarta	Points race
Silver medal – second place	2019 Jakarta	Omnium
Bronze medal – third place	2008 Nara	500m time trial
Bronze medal – third place	2008 Nara	Sprint
Bronze medal – third place	2018 Nilai	Omnium
Bronze medal – third place	2023 Nilai	Elimination
Bronze medal – third place	2023 Nilai	Omnium
Bronze medal – third place	2024 New Delhi	Elimination
Women's road cycling
Asian Championships
Gold medal – first place	2015 Nakhon Ratchasima	Road race
Silver medal – second place	2018 Naypyidaw	Road race
Silver medal – second place	2018 Naypyidaw	Individual time trial
Bronze medal – third place	2019 Tashkent	Individual time trial

Huang Ting-ying (Chinese: 黃亭茵; pinyin: Huáng Tíngyīn, born 29 May 1990) is a track and road cyclist from Taiwan. She competed on the track in the sprint event at the 2009 UCI Track Cycling World Championships. In 2015, she won the road race at the Asian Cycling Championships.

== Major results ==
=== Track ===
2008
Asian Track Championships

2nd Team sprint
3rd 500m time trial
3rd Sprint

2009
2nd Team sprint, Asian Track Championships
2010
2nd Team sprint, Asian Track Championships
2014
Taiwan Hsin-Chu Track International Classic

1st Omnium
1st Sprint
1st 500m time trial
2nd Keirin

Asian Games

3rd Team pursuit (with Hsiao Mei-yu, Tseng Hsiao-chia & Ju I Fang)
3rd Team sprint (with Hsiao Mei-yu)

2015
Asian Track Championships

1st Individual pursuit
1st Points race
1st Scratch

3rd Omnium, Japan Track Cup
2016
Asian Track Championships

1st Individual pursuit
1st Points race
2nd Scratch

Taiwan Hsin-Chu Track International

1st Scratch
2nd Keirin
2nd Team pursuit (with Chang Yao, Cheng Chia Hui & Cheng Yu Siou)

2018
Asian Track Championships

1st Scratch
2nd Individual pursuit
3rd Omnium

Asian Games

2nd Omnium
3rd Individual pursuit

2019
Asian Track Championships

1st Scratch
2nd Omnium
2nd Points race

=== Road ===
2013
2nd Overall Tour of Thailand

1st Stage 1

8th Overall Tour of Zhoushan Island
2014
6th Road race, Asian Road Championships
2015
1st Road race, Asian Road Championships
4th Overall The Princess Maha Chackri Sirindhon's Cup
8th Overall Tour of Chongming Island
2016
2nd Overall Tour of Thailand
2nd Overall Tour of Chongming Island

1st Stages 1 & 3

5th Road race, Asian Road Championships
2017
5th Time trial, Asian Road Championships
2018
Asian Road Championships

2nd Road race
2nd Time trial

7th Time trial, Asian Games
2019
National Road Championships

1st Time trial
1st Road race

3rd Time trial, Asian Road Championships
2023
5th Road race, Asian Games
5th Time trial, Asian Road Championships
8th Overall Tour of Thailand
2024
National Road Championships

1st Time trial
1st Road race

2025
10th Time trial, Asian Road Championships
