= Kohei Yamamoto (cyclist) =

Japanese cyclist

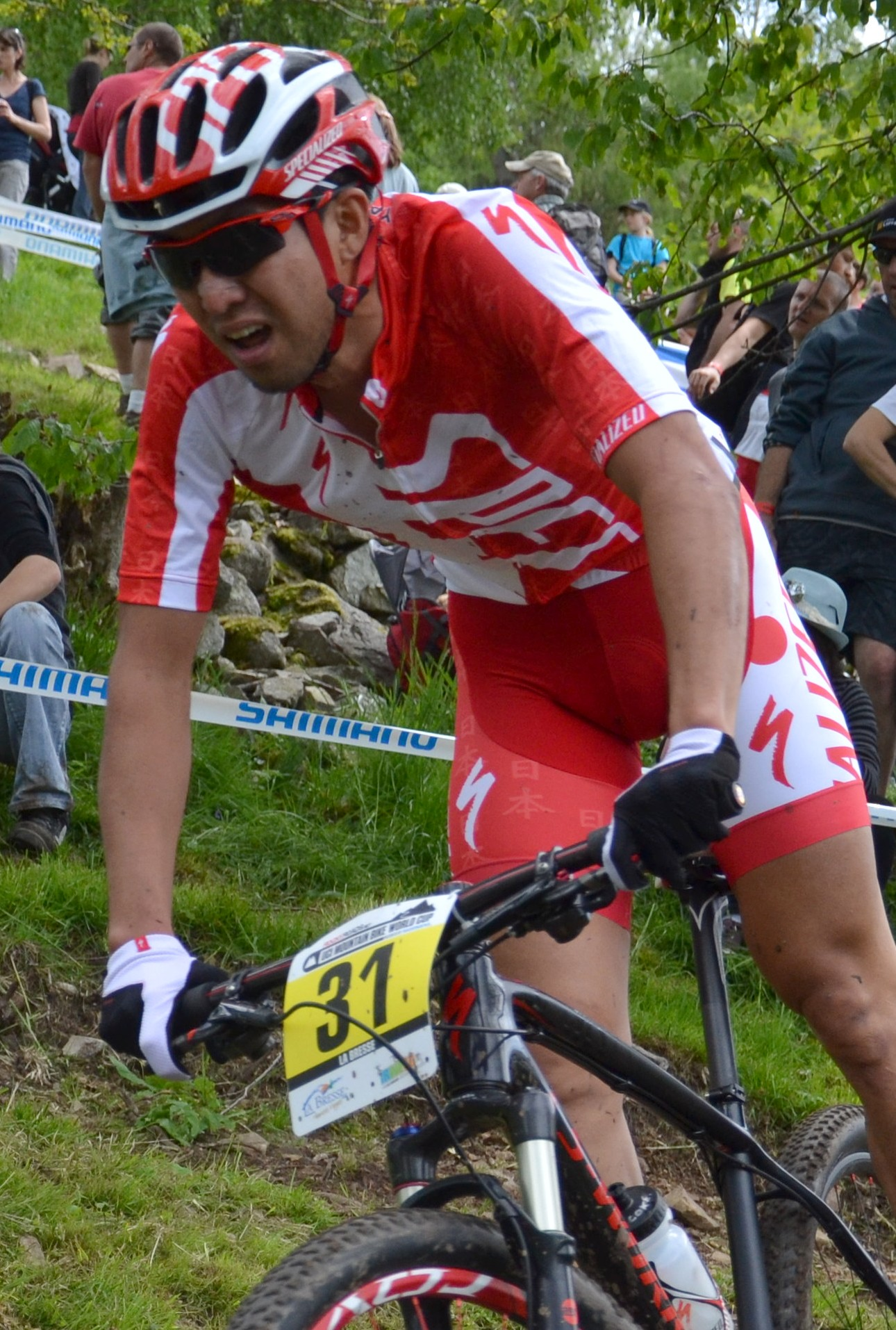

Personal information
- Full name: Kohei Yamamoto
- Nickname: Kohei
- Born: 20 August 1985 (age 41) Japan

Cycling career
- Sport: Cycling
- Current team: Specialized Racing
- Discipline: XC MTB
- Role: Rider

Professional teams
- 2007–2011: Team Bridgestone Anchor
- 2012–: Specialized Racing

Major wins
- Japanese National Championships (2008–2012); Asian Cycling Championship (2009–2011)

Kohei Yamamoto (山本幸平, Yamamoto Kōhei; born 20 August 1985 in Makubetsu, Hokkaido) is a Japanese cross-country mountain biker. At the 2008 Summer Olympics, he competed in the men's cross-country, finishing in 46th place. At the 2012 Summer Olympics, he competed in the Men's cross-country at Hadleigh Farm, finishing in 27th place. He rides for the Specialized Racing MTB team.
