= Sakura Tsukagoshi =

Japanese cyclist

Personal information
- Born: 13 April 1991 (age 35)

Cycling career
- Sport: Cycling
- Role: Rider

Sakura Tsukagoshi (塚越 さくら, Tsukagoshi Sakura; born 13 April 1991) is a Japanese professional racing cyclist. She rode at the 2015 UCI Track Cycling World Championships. She also competed at the 2014 Asian Games.

== Major results ==
2014
2nd Omnium, South Australian Track Classic
2nd Points Race, Japan Track Cup 1
2nd Omnium, Japan Track Cup 2
2015
Track Clubs ACC Cup

1st Omnium
1st Points Race

Asian Track Championships

3rd Points Race
3rd Team Pursuit (with Kanako Kase, Kisato Nakamura and Minami Uwano)

2016
Asian Track Championships

2nd Team Pursuit (with Yumi Kajihara, Kisato Nakamura and Minami Uwano)
3rd Omnium

Japan Track Cup

2nd Points Race
3rd Omnium

2nd Omnium, ITS Melbourne Grand Prix
2nd Omnium, ITS Melbourne DISC Grand Prix
