= Diao Xiaojuan =

Hong Kong cyclist

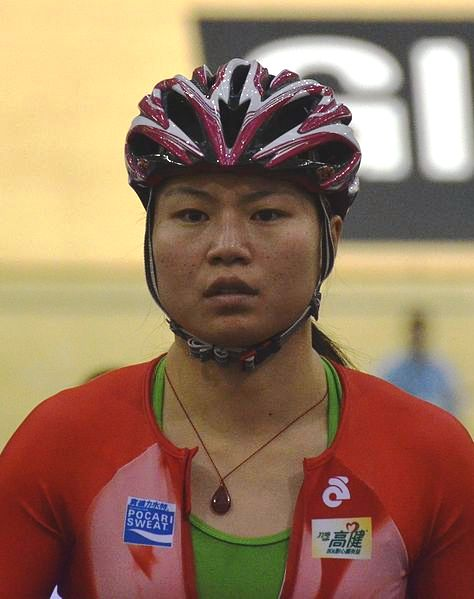
- Diao Xiaojuan (2012)

Personal information
- Born: 15 March 1984 (age 42) Fujian, China
- Weight: 66 kg (146 lb)

Cycling career
- Sport: Cycling
- Discipline: Track cycling

Professional team
- 2009, 2012: Hong Kong Pro Cycling

Diao Xiaojuan (Chinese: 刁小娟; born 15 March 1986) is a track cyclist representing Hong Kong. She competed in the 2009, 2010, 2011, 2012, 2013, 2014 and 2015 UCI Track Cycling World Championships. In 2008, she was recruited by coach Shen Jinkang (沈金康) to join the Hong Kong cycling team.

== Career results ==
2008
1st Scratch Race, International Track Challenge Vienna
2014
Hong Kong International Track Cup

1st Scratch Race
3rd Omnium

1st Points Race, Japan Track Cup 1
1st Omnium, Japan Track Cup 2
2015
1st Omnium, Hong Kong International Track Cup
Track Clubs ACC Cup

1st Scratch Race
2nd Omnium

2nd Omnium, Asian Track Championships
2017
Asian Track Championships

2nd Team Pursuit (with Leung Bo Yee, Pang Yao and Yang Qianyu)
3rd Scratch Race

2nd Scratch Race, Taiwan Cup Track International Classic II
