= 2016 UCI Track Cycling World Championships – Women's 500 m time trial =

Women's 500 m time trial at the 2016 UCI Track Cycling World Championships
- Venue: Lee Valley VeloPark, London
- Date: 4 March
- Competitors: 15 from 11 nations
- Winning time: 32.959

Medalists
gold medal	Anastasia Voynova	Russia
silver medal	Lee Wai Sze	Hong Kong
bronze medal	Elis Ligtlee	Netherlands

The Women's 500 m time trial event of the 2016 UCI Track Cycling World Championships was held on 4 March 2016. Anastasia Voynova of Russia won the gold medal.

== Results ==
The race was started at 14:30.

Rank	Name	Nation	Time	Behind	Notes
1st place, gold medalist(s)	Anastasia Voynova	Russia	32.959		
2nd place, silver medalist(s)	Lee Wai Sze	Hong Kong	33.736	+0.777	
3rd place, bronze medalist(s)	Elis Ligtlee	Netherlands	33.760	+0.801	
4	Daria Shmeleva	Russia	33.886	+0.927	
5	Katy Marchant	Great Britain	34.032	+1.073	
6	Laurine van Riessen	Netherlands	34.065	+1.106	
7	Miriam Welte	Germany	34.192	+1.233	
8	Tania Calvo	Spain	34.264	+1.305	
9	Lisandra Guerra	Cuba	34.692	+1.733	
10	Jessica Salazar	Mexico	34.705	+1.746	
11	Ekaterina Gnidenko	Russia	34.757	+1.798	
12	Martha Bayona	Colombia	34.903	+1.944	
13	Luz Gaxiola	Mexico	35.137	+2.178	
14	Migle Marozaite	Lithuania	35.350	+2.391	
15	Deborah Deborah	India	36.229	+3.270	
