= 2016 UCI Track Cycling World Championships – Women's individual pursuit =

Women's individual pursuit at the 2016 UCI Track Cycling World Championships
- Venue: Lee Valley VeloPark, London
- Date: 2 March
- Competitors: 13 from 13 nations
- Winning time: 3:34.099

Medalists
gold medal	Rebecca Wiasak	Australia
silver medal	Małgorzata Wojtyra	Poland
bronze medal	Annie Foreman-Mackey	Canada

The Women's individual pursuit event of the 2016 UCI Track Cycling World Championships was held on 2 March 2016. Rebecca Wiasak of Australia won gold.

== Results ==
=== Qualifying ===
The qualifying was started at 14:27.

Rank	Name	Nation	Time	Behind	Notes
1	Rebecca Wiasak	Australia	3:31.287		Q
2	Małgorzata Wojtyra	Poland	3:34.519	+3.232	Q
3	Annie Foreman-Mackey	Canada	3:35.694	+4.407	q
4	Ruth Winder	United States	3:37.016	+5.729	q
5	Mieke Kröger	Germany	3:38.002	+6.715	
6	Élise Delzenne	France	3:39.600	+8.313	
7	Melanie Späth	Ireland	3:40.030	+8.743	
8	Beatrice Bartelloni	Italy	3:40.394	+9.107	
9	Lotte Kopecky	Belgium	3:40.702	+9.415	
10	Gloria Rodríguez	Spain	3:41.992	+10.705	
11	Edita Mazurevičiūtė	Lithuania	3:46.051	+14.764	
12	Pang Yao	Hong Kong	3:49.559	+18.272	
13	Minami Uwano	Japan	3:49.788	+18.501	

=== Finals ===
The finals were started at 19:05.

Rank	Name	Nation	Time	Behind
Gold Medal Race
1	Rebecca Wiasak	Australia	3:34.099	
2	Małgorzata Wojtyra	Poland	3:41.904	+6.805
Bronze Medal Race
3	Annie Foreman-Mackey	Canada	3:36.055	
4	Ruth Winder	United States	3:39.902	+3.857
