= 2016 UCI Track Cycling World Championships – Men's team sprint =

Men's team sprint at the 2016 UCI Track Cycling World Championships
- Venue: Lee Valley VeloPark, London
- Date: 2 March
- Competitors: 43 from 14 nations
- Teams: 14
- Winning time: 43.257

Medalists
gold medal	Ethan Mitchell; Sam Webster; Eddie Dawkins	New Zealand
silver medal	Nils van 't Hoenderdaal; Jeffrey Hoogland; Matthijs Büchli; Hugo Haak	Netherlands
bronze medal	René Enders; Max Niederlag; Joachim Eilers	Germany

The Men's team sprint event of the 2016 UCI Track Cycling World Championships was held on 2 March 2016. New Zealand won the gold medal.

== Results ==
=== Qualifying ===
The qualifying was started at 15:29.

Rank	Name	Nation	Time	Behind	Notes
1	Ethan Mitchell; Sam Webster; Eddie Dawkins	New Zealand	43.096		Q
2	Nils van 't Hoenderdaal; Jeffrey Hoogland; Hugo Haak	Netherlands	43.266	+0.170	Q
3	Grégory Baugé; Kévin Sireau; Michaël D'Almeida	France	43.487	+0.391	q
4	René Enders; Max Niederlag; Joachim Eilers	Germany	43.496	+0.400	q
5	Nathan Hart; Matthew Glaetzer; Patrick Constable	Australia	43.497	+0.401	
6	Philip Hindes; Jason Kenny; Callum Skinner	Great Britain	43.507	+0.411	
7	Pavel Yakushevskiy; Denis Dmitriev; Nikita Shurshin	Russia	43.538	+0.442	
8	Grzegorz Drejgier; Rafał Sarnecki; Krzysztof Maksel	Poland	43.751	+0.655	
9	Hu Ke; Bao Saifei; Xu Chao	China	44.496	+1.400	
10	César Marcano; Hersony Canelón; Ángel Pulgar	Venezuela	44.654	+1.558	
11	Son Je-yong; Kang Dong-jin; Im Chae-bin	South Korea	44.767	+1.671	
12	Kazuki Amagai; Kazunari Watanabe; Seiichiro Nakagawa	Japan	44.960	+1.864	
13	José Moreno Sánchez; Juan Peralta; Sergio Aliaga	Spain	45.013	+1.917	
14	Hugo Osteti; Kacio Freitas; Flavio Cipriano	Brazil	45.557	+2.461	

=== Finals ===
The finals were started at 21:00.

Rank	Name	Nation	Time	Behind	Notes
Gold medal race
1st place, gold medalist(s)	Ethan Mitchell; Sam Webster; Eddie Dawkins	New Zealand	43.257		
2nd place, silver medalist(s)	Nils van 't Hoenderdaal; Jeffrey Hoogland; Matthijs Büchli	Netherlands	43.469	+0.212	
Bronze medal race
3rd place, bronze medalist(s)	René Enders; Max Niederlag; Joachim Eilers	Germany	43.536		
4	Grégory Baugé; Kévin Sireau; Michaël D'Almeida	France	43.577	+0.041	
