= Australia at the UCI Track Cycling World Championships =

- IOC code: AUS
- Medals: Gold 87 Silver 94 Bronze 77 Total 258

UCI Track Cycling World Championships appearances (overview)
- Recent: 2009; 2010; 2011; 2012; 2013; 2014; 2015; 2016; 2017; 2018; 2019; 2020; 2021; 2022; 2023; 2024; 2025; 2026

This page is an overview of the Australia at the UCI Track Cycling World Championships.

== List of medalists ==
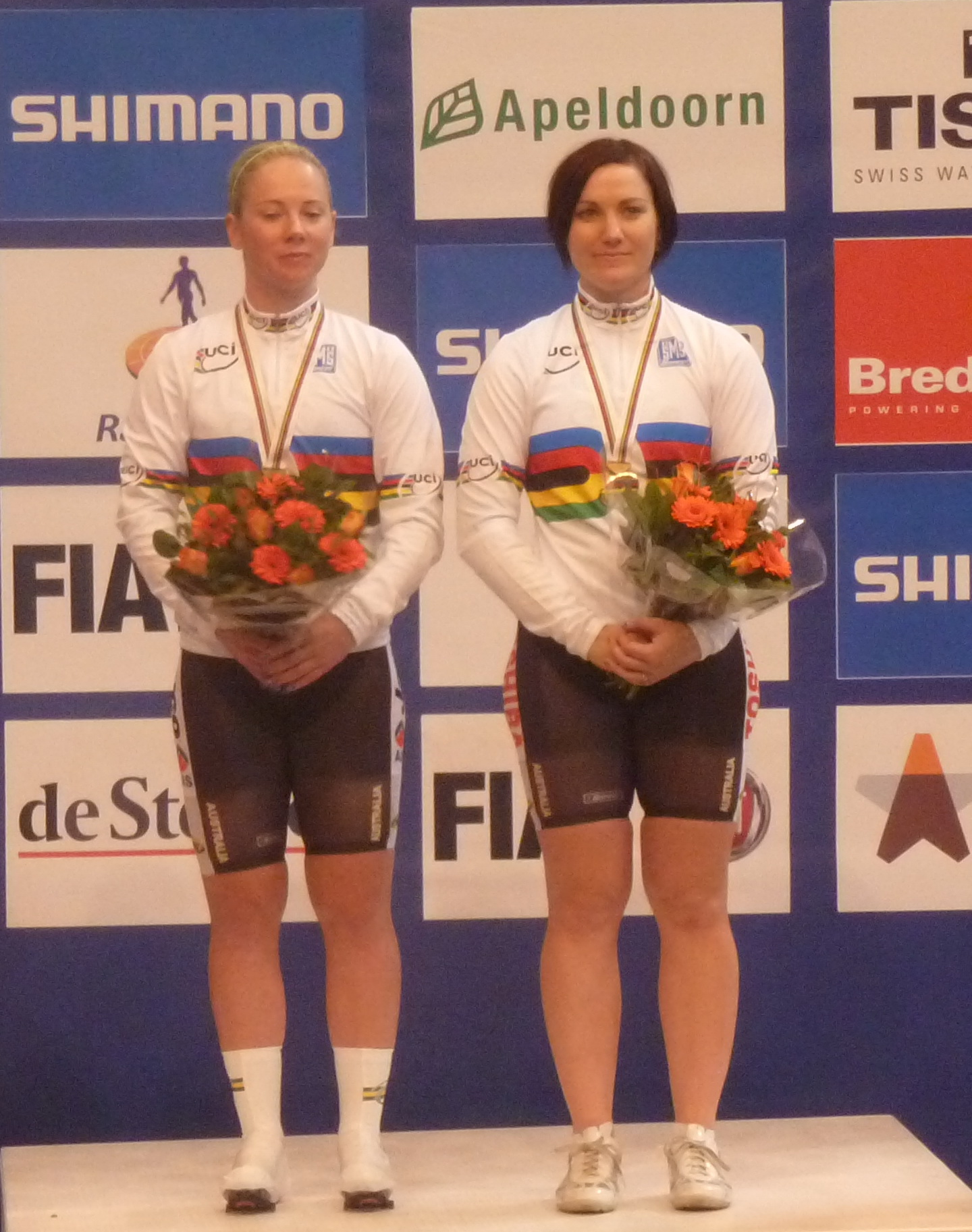
Anna Meares and Kaarle McCulloch won the gold medal in the women's team sprint in 2011.

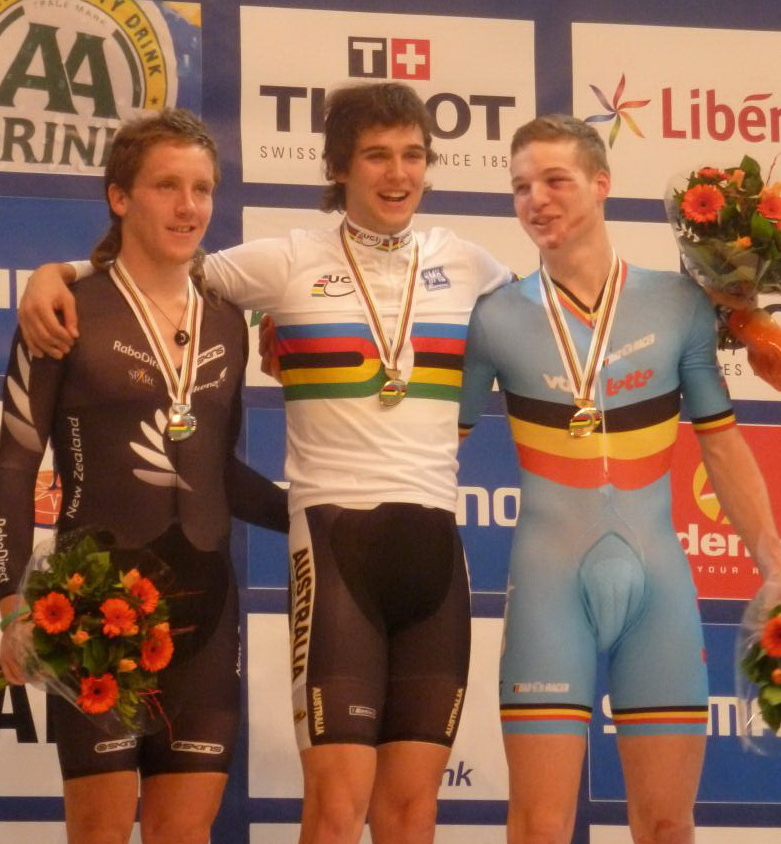
Michael Freiberg won the gold medal in the Men's omnium in 2011.

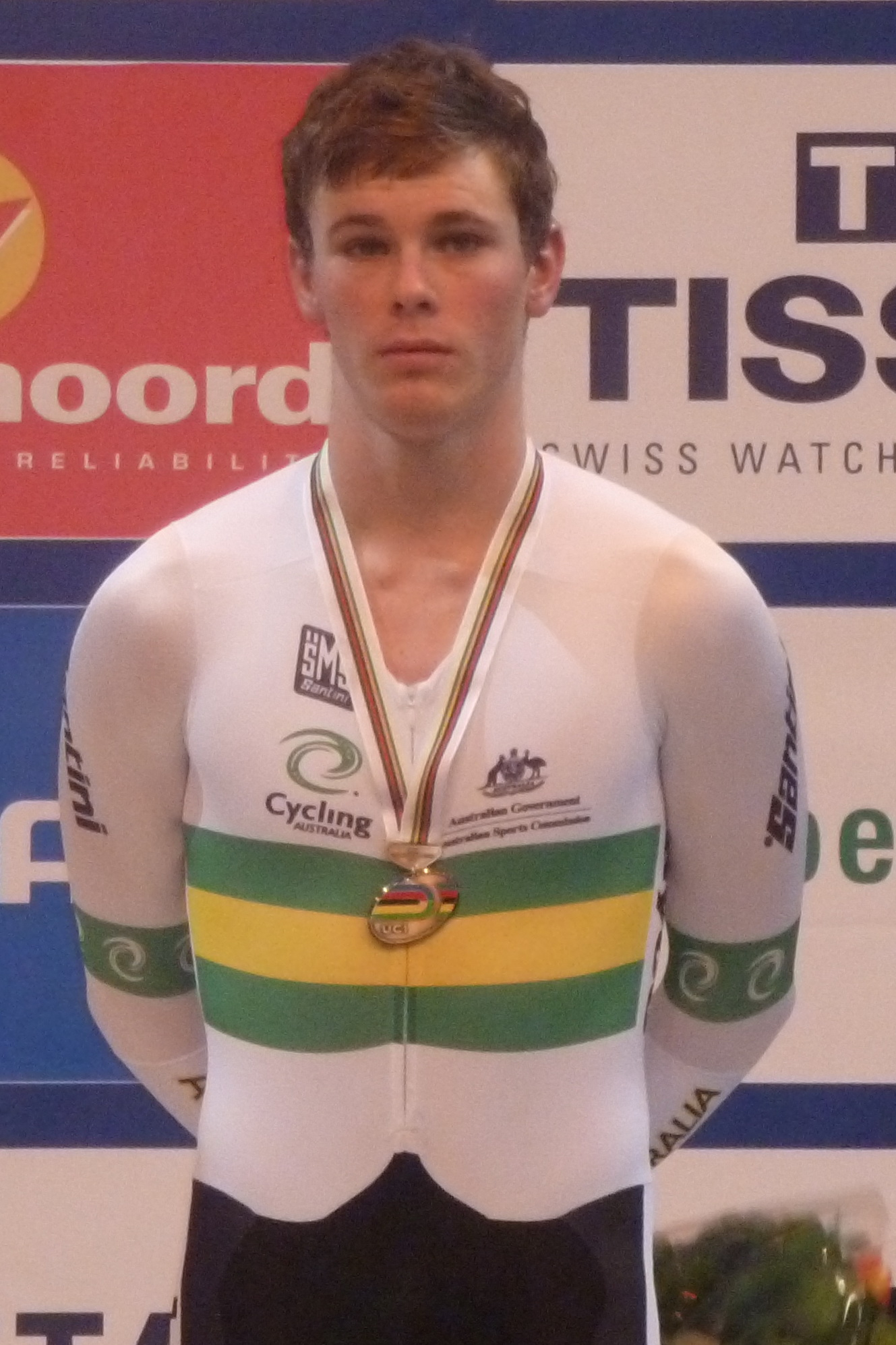
Michael Hepburn won the bronze medal in the Men's individual pursuit in 2011.

This is a list of Australian medals won at the UCI Track World Championships. This list includes the amateur and defunct disciplines.

Medal	Championship	Name	Event
Silver	1912 Newark	Alfred Grenda	Men's sprint
Gold	1920 Antwerp	Bob Spears	Men's sprint
Bronze	1920 Antwerp	Gerald Halpin	Men's sprint (amateur)
Silver	1921 Copenhagen	Bob Spears	Men's sprint
Silver	1922 Paris	Bob Spears	Men's sprint
Bronze	1928 Budapest	Jack Standen	Men's sprint (amateur)
Gold	1949 Copenhagen	Sid Patterson	Men's sprint (amateur)
Gold	1950 Rocourt	Sid Patterson	Men's individual pursuit (amateur)
Silver	1951 Milan	Russell Mockridge	Men's sprint (amateur)
Bronze	1951 Milan	Sid Patterson	Men's sprint
Gold	1952 Paris	Sid Patterson	Men's individual pursuit
Gold	1953 Zürich	Sid Patterson	Men's individual pursuit
Silver	1954 Cologne	John Tressider	Men's sprint (amateur)
Bronze	1954 Cologne	Joe Bunker	Men's motor-paced
Bronze	1955 Milan	John Tressider	Men's sprint (amateur)
Gold	1956 Copenhagen	Graham French	Men's motor-paced
Bronze	1957 Rocourt	Graham French	Men's motor-paced
Bronze	1958 Paris	Dick Ploog	Men's sprint (amateur)
Bronze	1961 Zurich	Ron Baensch	Men's sprint (amateur)
Silver	1964 Paris	Ron Baensch	Men's sprint
Bronze	1965 San Sebastián	Ron Baensch	Men's sprint
Silver	1966 Frankfurt	Ron Baensch	Men's sprint
Gold	1970 Leicester	Gordon Johnson	Men's sprint
Silver	1972 Marseille	Gordon Johnson	Men's sprint
Silver	1974 Montreal	John Nicholson	Men's sprint
Gold	1975 Rocourt	John Nicholson	Men's sprint
Gold	1976 Monteroni di Lecce	John Nicholson	Men's sprint
Bronze	1977 San Cristóbal	John Nicholson	Men's sprint
Gold	1980 Besançon	Danny Clark	Men's keirin
Gold	1980 Besançon	Gary Sutton	Men's points race (amateur)
Gold	1981 Brno	Danny Clark	Men's keirin
Silver	1981 Brno	Danny Clark	Men's points race
Silver	1982 Leicester	Danny Clark	Men's keirin
Silver	1982 Leicester	Gary Sutton	Men's points race
Gold	1983 Zürich	Steele Bishop	Men's individual pursuit
Silver	1983 Zürich	Danny Clark	Men's keirin
Bronze	1983 Zürich	Gary Sutton	Men's points race
Silver	1984 Barcelona	Gary Sutton	Men's points race
Silver	1985 Bassano del Grappa	Danny Clark	Men's motor-paced
Bronze	1985 Bassano del Grappa	Martin Vinnicombe	Men's 1 km time trial
Silver	1986 Colorado Springs	Martin Vinnicombe	Men's 1 km time trial
Bronze	1986 Colorado Springs	Dean Woods	Men's individual pursuit (amateur)
Gold	1987 Vienna	Martin Vinnicombe	Men's 1 km time trial
Silver	1987 Vienna	Danny Clark	Men's motor-paced
Gold	1988 Ghent	Stephen Pate	Men's sprint
Gold	1988 Ghent	Danny Clark	Men's motor-paced
Silver	1989 Lyon	Martin Vinnicombe	Men's 1 km time trial
Silver	1989 Lyon	Dean Woods	Men's individual pursuit
Silver	1989 Lyon	Gary Sutton	Men's points race
Gold	1990 Maebashi	Stephen McGlede	Men's points race (amateur)
Silver	1990 Maebashi	Martin Vinnicombe	Men's 1 km time trial
Bronze	1990 Maebashi	Stephen Pate	Men's sprint
Bronze	1990 Maebashi	Danny Clark	Men's points race
Bronze	1990 Maebashi	Danny Clark	Men's motor-paced
Bronze	1990 Maebashi	Brett Aitken Mark Kingsland; Darren Winter; Stephen McGlede	Men's team pursuit
Gold	1991 Stuttgart	Danny Clark	Men's motor-paced
Silver	1991 Stuttgart	Stephen McGlede	Men's points race (amateur)
Bronze	1991 Stuttgart	Brett Aitken Stuart O'Grady; Shaun O'Brien; Stephen McGlede	Men's team pursuit
Bronze	1991 Stuttgart	Gary Neiwand	Men's sprint (amateur)
Silver	1992 Valencia	Stephen Pate	Men's keirin
Bronze	1992 Valencia	Anthony Peden; David Dew	Men's tandem
Gold	1993 Hamar	Brett Aitken Stuart O'Grady; Billy Shearsby; Tim O'Shannessy	Men's team pursuit
Gold	1993 Hamar	Gary Neiwand	Men's sprint
Gold	1993 Hamar	Gary Neiwand	Men's keirin
Silver	1993 Hamar	Shane Kelly	Men's 1 km time trial
Silver	1993 Hamar	Stephen Pate; Danny Day	Men's tandem
Silver	1994 Palermo	Darryn Hill	Men's sprint
Bronze	1994 Palermo	Shane Kelly	Men's 1 km time trial
Bronze	1994 Palermo	Tim O'Shannessy Stuart O'Grady; Rodney McGee; Brett Aitken	Men's team pursuit
Gold	1995 Bogotá	Shane Kelly	Men's 1 km time trial
Gold	1995 Bogotá	Darryn Hill	Men's sprint
Gold	1995 Bogotá	Tim O'Shannessy Stuart O'Grady; Rodney McGee; Bradley McGee	Men's team pursuit
Bronze	1995 Bogotá	Stuart O'Grady	Men's individual pursuit
Bronze	1995 Bogotá	Michelle Ferris	Women's 500 m time trial
Gold	1996 Manchester	Shane Kelly	Men's 1 km time trial
Gold	1996 Manchester	Darryn Hill Shane Kelly; Gary Neiwand	Men's team sprint
Silver	1996 Manchester	Gary Neiwand	Men's keirin
Silver	1996 Manchester	Scott McGrory Stephen Pate	Men's madison
Silver	1996 Manchester	Lucy Tyler	Women's individual pursuit
Bronze	1996 Manchester	Darryn Hill	Men's sprint
Bronze	1996 Manchester	Michelle Ferris	Women's 500 m time trial
Gold	1997 Perth	Shane Kelly	Men's 1 km time trial
Silver	1997 Perth	Michelle Ferris	Women's 500 m time trial
Silver	1997 Perth	Michelle Ferris	Women's sprint
Bronze	1997 Perth	Danny Day Shane Kelly; Sean Eadie	Men's team sprint
Bronze	1997 Perth	Darryn Hill	Men's sprint
Gold	1998 Bordeaux	Lucy Tyler-Sharman	Women's individual pursuit
Silver	1998 Bordeaux	Shane Kelly	Men's 1 km time trial
Silver	1998 Bordeaux	Danny Day Shane Kelly; Graham Sharman	Men's team sprint
Silver	1998 Bordeaux	Michelle Ferris	Women's sprint
Bronze	1998 Bordeaux	Michelle Ferris	Women's 500 m time trial
Silver	1999 Berlin	Shane Kelly	Men's 1 km time trial
Silver	1999 Berlin	Michelle Ferris	Women's sprint
Gold	2001 Antwerp	Ryan Bayley	Men's keirin
Silver	2001 Antwerp	Ryan Bayley Jobie Dajka; Sean Eadie	Men's team sprint
Silver	2001 Antwerp	Katherine Bates	Women's points race
Gold	2002 Ballerup	Brad McGee	Men's individual pursuit
Gold	2002 Ballerup	Sean Eadie	Men's sprint
Gold	2002 Ballerup	Peter Dawson Brett Lancaster; Stephen Wooldridge; Luke Roberts; Mark Renshaw (qualifying round only)	Men's team pursuit
Gold	2002 Ballerup	Jobie Dajka	Men's keirin
Silver	2002 Ballerup	Luke Roberts	Men's individual pursuit
Silver	2002 Ballerup	Jobie Dajka	Men's sprint
Silver	2002 Ballerup	Ryan Bayley Jobie Dajka; Sean Eadie	Men's team sprint
Silver	2002 Ballerup	Kerrie Meares	Women's sprint
Silver	2002 Ballerup	Rochelle Gilmore	Women's scratch
Bronze	2002 Ballerup	Shane Kelly	Men's 1 km time trial
Bronze	2002 Ballerup	Kerrie Meares	Women's 500 m time trial
Bronze	2002 Ballerup	Katherine Bates	Women's individual pursuit
Bronze	2002 Ballerup	Rosealee Hubbard	Women's keirin
Gold	2003 Stuttgart	Peter Dawson Brett Lancaster; Graeme Brown; Luke Roberts	Men's team pursuit
Silver	2003 Stuttgart	Shane Kelly	Men's 1 km time trial
Silver	2003 Stuttgart	Luke Roberts	Men's individual pursuit
Silver	2003 Stuttgart	Jobie Dajka	Men's keirin
Silver	2003 Stuttgart	Katie Mactier	Women's individual pursuit
Silver	2003 Stuttgart	Anna Meares	Women's keirin
Silver	2003 Stuttgart	Rochelle Gilmore	Women's scratch
Silver	2003 Stuttgart	Jobie Dajka	Men's sprint
Gold	2004 Melbourne	Peter Dawson Stephen Wooldridge; Ashley Hutchinson; Luke Roberts; Mark Renshaw (qualifying round only)	Men's team pursuit
Gold	2004 Melbourne	Anna Meares	Women's 500 m time trial
Silver	2004 Melbourne	Katie Mactier	Women's individual pursuit
Silver	2004 Melbourne	Anna Meares	Women's sprint
Bronze	2004 Melbourne	Ryan Bayley	Men's sprint
Gold	2005 Los Angeles	Katie Mactier	Women's individual pursuit
Silver	2005 Los Angeles	Anna Meares	Women's 500 m time trial
Silver	2005 Los Angeles	Katherine Bates	Women's individual pursuit
Silver	2005 Los Angeles	Katherine Bates	Women's scratch
Bronze	2005 Los Angeles	Jobie Dajka	Men's sprint
Bronze	2005 Los Angeles	Matthew Goss Stephen Wooldridge; Ashley Hutchinson; Mark Jamieson	Men's team pursuit
Bronze	2005 Los Angeles	Shane John Kelly	Men's keirin
Bronze	2005 Los Angeles	Anna Meares	Women's sprint
Bronze	2005 Los Angeles	Katherine Bates	Women's points race
Gold	2006 Bordeaux	Matthew Goss Stephen Wooldridge; Peter Dawson; Mark Jamieson	Men's team pursuit
Silver	2006 Bordeaux	Ben Kersten	Men's 1 km time trial
Silver	2006 Bordeaux	Anna Meares	Women's 500 m time trial
Bronze	2006 Bordeaux	Ryan Bayley Shane Kelly; Shane Perkins	Men's team sprint
Bronze	2006 Bordeaux	Katie Mactier	Women's individual pursuit
Gold	2007 Palma de Mallorca	Anna Meares	Women's 500 m time trial
Gold	2007 Palma de Mallorca	Katherine Bates	Women's points race
Bronze	2007 Palma de Mallorca	Kristine Bayley Anna Meares	Women's team sprint
Bronze	2007 Palma de Mallorca	Katie Mactier	Women's individual pursuit
Bronze	2007 Palma de Mallorca	Anna Meares	Women's sprint
Bronze	2007 Palma de Mallorca	Anna Meares	Women's keirin
Silver	2008 Manchester	Leigh Howard	Men's omnium
Bronze	2008 Manchester	Belinda Goss	Women's scratch
Bronze	2008 Manchester	Graeme Brown Bradley McGee; Luke Roberts; Mark Jamieson; Jack Bobridge (qualifying round only)	Men's team pursuit
Bronze	2008 Manchester	Katie Mactier	Women's individual pursuit
Gold	2009 Pruszków	Cameron Meyer	Men's points race
Gold	2009 Pruszków	Leigh Howard	Men's omnium
Gold	2009 Pruszków	Josephine Tomic	Women's omnium
Gold	2009 Pruszków	Kaarle McCulloch Anna Meares	Women's team sprint
Silver	2009 Pruszków	Jack Bobridge	Men's individual pursuit
Silver	2009 Pruszków	Jack Bobridge Rohan Dennis; Leigh Howard; Cameron Meyer	Men's team pursuit
Silver	2009 Pruszków	Leigh Howard Cameron Meyer	Men's madison
Silver	2009 Pruszków	Anna Meares	Women's 500 m time trial
Bronze	2009 Pruszków	Ashlee Ankudinoff Sarah Kent; Josephine Tomic	Women's team pursuit
Bronze	2009 Pruszków	Belinda Goss	Women's scratch
Gold	2010 Ballerup	Jack Bobridge Rohan Dennis; Michael Hepburn; Cameron Meyer; Leigh Howard (qualifying round only)	Men's team pursuit
Gold	2010 Ballerup	Cameron Meyer	Men's points race
Gold	2010 Ballerup	Leigh Howard Cameron Meyer	Men's madison
Gold	2010 Ballerup	Anna Meares	Women's 500 m time trial
Gold	2010 Ballerup	Ashlee Ankudinoff Sarah Kent; Josephine Tomic	Women's team pursuit
Gold	2010 Ballerup	Kaarle McCulloch Anna Meares	Women's team sprint
Silver	2010 Ballerup	Shane Perkins	Men's sprint
Silver	2010 Ballerup	Leigh Howard	Men's omnium
Bronze	2010 Ballerup	Jack Bobridge	Men's individual pursuit
Bronze	2010 Ballerup	Belinda Goss	Women's scratch
Gold	2011 Apeldoorn	Jack Bobridge	Men's individual pursuit
Gold	2011 Apeldoorn	Jack Bobridge Rohan Dennis; Michael Hepburn; Luke Durbridge	Men's team pursuit
Gold	2011 Apeldoorn	Shane Perkins	Men's keirin
Gold	2011 Apeldoorn	Leigh Howard Cameron Meyer	Men's madison
Gold	2011 Apeldoorn	Michael Freiberg	Men's omnium
Gold	2011 Apeldoorn	Anna Meares	Women's sprint
Gold	2011 Apeldoorn	Anna Meares	Women's keirin
Gold	2011 Apeldoorn	Kaarle McCulloch Anna Meares	Women's team sprint
Silver	2011 Apeldoorn	Cameron Meyer	Men's points race
Silver	2011 Apeldoorn	Katherine Bates	Women's scratch
Bronze	2011 Apeldoorn	Michael Hepburn	Men's individual pursuit
Bronze	2011 Apeldoorn (Note: The Australian team originally finished in 4th place, but the French team was stripped of their title in January 2012, with the other teams in the final round promoted to the respective medal positions.)	Dan Ellis Matthew Glaetzer; Jason Niblett	Men's team sprint
Gold	2012 Melbourne	Michael Hepburn	Men's individual pursuit
Gold	2012 Melbourne	Shane Perkins Scott Sunderland; Matthew Glaetzer	Men's team sprint
Gold	2012 Melbourne	Cameron Meyer	Men's points race
Gold	2012 Melbourne	Glenn O'Shea	Men's omnium
Gold	2012 Melbourne	Anna Meares	Women's 500 m time trial
Gold	2012 Melbourne	Anna Meares	Women's keirin
Silver	2012 Melbourne	Jack Bobridge	Men's individual pursuit
Silver	2012 Melbourne	Jack Bobridge Rohan Dennis; Michael Hepburn; Glenn O'Shea	Men's team pursuit
Silver	2012 Melbourne	Annette Edmondson	Women's omnium
Silver	2012 Melbourne	Annette Edmondson Melissa Hoskins; Josephine Tomic	Women's team pursuit
Silver	2012 Melbourne	Kaarle McCulloch Anna Meares	Women's team sprint
Silver	2012 Melbourne	Melissa Hoskins	Women's scratch
Bronze	2012 Melbourne	Leigh Howard Cameron Meyer	Men's madison
Bronze	2012 Melbourne	Ashlee Ankudinoff	Women's individual pursuit
Bronze	2012 Melbourne	Anna Meares	Women's sprint
Gold	2013 Minsk	Michael Hepburn	Men's individual pursuit
Gold	2013 Minsk	Alex Edmondson Alexander Morgan; Michael Hepburn; Glenn O'Shea	Men's team pursuit
Silver	2013 Minsk	Amy Cure	Women's individual pursuit
Silver	2013 Minsk	Annette Edmondson Melissa Hoskins; Amy Cure	Women's team pursuit
Bronze	2013 Minsk	Luke Davison	Men's scratch
Bronze	2013 Minsk	Glenn O'Shea	Men's omnium
Bronze	2013 Minsk	Annette Edmondson	Women's omnium
Bronze	2013 Minsk	Annette Edmondson	Women's individual pursuit
Gold	2014 Cali	Alex Edmondson Luke Davison; Mitchell Mulhern; Glenn O'Shea; Miles Scotson	Men's team pursuit
Gold	2014 Cali	Alex Edmondson	Men's individual pursuit
Gold	2014 Cali	Amy Cure	Women's points race
Silver	2014 Cali	Anna Meares	Women's keirin
Silver	2014 Cali	Anna Meares	Women's 500 m time trial
Bronze	2014 Cali	Amy Cure	Women's individual pursuit
Bronze	2014 Cali	Annette Edmondson Melissa Hoskins; Amy Cure; Isabella King	Women's team pursuit
Bronze	2014 Cali	Annette Edmondson	Women's omnium
Gold	2015 Saint-Quentin-en-Yvelines	Anna Meares	Women's keirin
Gold	2015 Saint-Quentin-en-Yvelines	Rebecca Wiasak	Women's individual pursuit
Gold	2015 Saint-Quentin-en-Yvelines	Annette Edmondson Melissa Hoskins; Amy Cure; Ashlee Ankudinoff	Women's team pursuit
Gold	2015 Saint-Quentin-en-Yvelines	Annette Edmondson	Women's omnium
Silver	2015 Saint-Quentin-en-Yvelines	Jack Bobridge	Men's individual pursuit
Silver	2015 Saint-Quentin-en-Yvelines	Glenn O'Shea	Men's omnium
Silver	2015 Saint-Quentin-en-Yvelines	Anna Meares	Women's 500 m time trial
Silver	2015 Saint-Quentin-en-Yvelines	Amy Cure	Women's scratch
Bronze	2015 Saint-Quentin-en-Yvelines	Alex Edmondson Jack Bobridge; Mitchell Mulhern; Miles Scotson	Men's team pursuit
Bronze	2015 Saint-Quentin-en-Yvelines	Amy Cure	Women's individual pursuit
Bronze	2015 Saint-Quentin-en-Yvelines	Kaarle McCulloch Anna Meares	Women's team sprint
Gold	2016 London	Sam Welsford Michael Hepburn; Callum Scotson; Miles Scotson; Alexander Porter; Luke Davison	Men's team pursuit
Gold	2016 London	Rebecca Wiasak	Women's individual pursuit
Silver	2016 London	Matthew Glaetzer	Men's sprint
Silver	2016 London	Anna Meares	Women's keirin
Bronze	2016 London	Glenn O'Shea	Men's omnium
Gold	2017 Hong Kong	Sam Welsford Cameron Meyer; Nick Yallouris; Alexander Porter; Kelland O'Brien; Rohan Wight	Men's team pursuit
Gold	2017 Hong Kong	Jordan Kerby	Men's individual pursuit
Gold	2017 Hong Kong	Cameron Meyer	Men's points race
Silver	2017 Hong Kong	Cameron Meyer Callum Scotson	Men's madison
Silver	2017 Hong Kong	Stephanie Morton	Women's sprint
Silver	2017 Hong Kong	Kaarle McCulloch Stephanie Morton	Women's team sprint
Silver	2017 Hong Kong	Ashlee Ankudinoff	Women's individual pursuit
Silver	2017 Hong Kong	Alexandra Manly Rebecca Wiasak; Amy Cure; Ashlee Ankudinoff	Women's team pursuit
Bronze	2017 Hong Kong	Kelland O'Brien	Men's individual pursuit
Bronze	2017 Hong Kong	Amy Cure	Women's omnium
Bronze	2017 Hong Kong	Amy Cure Alexandra Manly	Women's madison
Gold	2018 Apeldoorn	Matthew Glaetzer	Men's sprint
Gold	2018 Apeldoorn	Cameron Meyer	Men's points race
Silver	2018 Apeldoorn	Matthew Glaetzer	Men's 1 km time trial
Silver	2018 Apeldoorn	Stephanie Morton	Women's sprint
Bronze	2018 Apeldoorn	Callum Scotson	Men's scratch
Bronze	2018 Apeldoorn	Cameron Meyer Callum Scotson	Men's madison
Gold	2019 Pruszków	Sam Welsford Kelland O'Brien; Leigh Howard; Alexander Porter; Cameron Scott	Men's team pursuit
Gold	2019 Pruszków	Sam Welsford	Men's scratch
Gold	2019 Pruszków	Kaarle McCulloch Stephanie Morton	Women's team sprint
Gold	2019 Pruszków	Ashlee Ankudinoff	Women's individual pursuit
Gold	2019 Pruszków	Annette Edmondson Georgia Baker; Amy Cure; Ashlee Ankudinoff; Alexandra Manly	Women's team pursuit
Gold	2019 Pruszków	Alexandra Manly	Women's points race
Silver	2019 Pruszków	Stephanie Morton	Women's sprint
Silver	2019 Pruszków	Kaarle McCulloch	Women's keirin
Silver	2019 Pruszków	Amy Cure Georgia Baker	Women's madison
Bronze	2019 Pruszków	Kaarle McCulloch	Women's 500 m time trial
Silver	2020 Berlin	Kaarle McCulloch Stephanie Morton	Women's team sprint
Bronze	2020 Berlin	Stephanie Morton	Women's keirin
Bronze	2020 Berlin	Thomas Cornish; Nathan Hart; Matthew Richardson	Men's team sprint
Gold	2022 Saint-Quentin-en-Yvelines	Matthew Glaetzer; Leigh Hoffman; Matthew Richardson; Thomas Cornish	Men's team sprint
Silver	2022 Saint-Quentin-en-Yvelines	Matthew Richardson	Men's sprint
Bronze	2022 Saint-Quentin-en-Yvelines	Matthew Glaetzer	Men's sprint

== Medal table ==
=== Medals by discipline ===
updated after the 2023 UCI Track Cycling World Championships

Event	Gold	Silver	Bronze	Total	Rank
Men's 1 km time trial	4	10	4	18	
Men's individual pursuit	9	6	4	19	
Men's individual pursuit (amateur)	1	0	1	2	
Men's team pursuit	13	2	6	21	1
Men's sprint	9	13	9	31	
Men's sprint (amateur)	1	2	6	9	
Men's team sprint	3	4	4	11	
Men's keirin	6	6	1	13	
Men's scratch	1	0	2	3	
Men's points race	5	5	2	12	
Men's points race (amateur)	2	1	0	3	
Men's omnium	3	3	2	8	
Men's madison	2	3	2	7	
Men's motor-paced (defunct)	3	2	3	8	
Men's tandem (defunct)	0	1	1	2	
Women's 500 m time trial	4	7	5	16	
Women's individual pursuit	5	6	8	19	
Women's team pursuit	3	3	2	8	3
Women's sprint	1	8	3	12	
Women's team sprint	4	3	2	9	2
Women's keirin	3	4	3	10	
Women's scratch	0	6	3	9	
Women's points race	3	2	1	6	
Women's omnium	2	1	3	6	
Women's madison	0	2	1	3	
Total	87	100	78	265	

== 2015 results ==
Australia competed at the 2015 UCI Track Cycling World Championships in Saint-Quentin-en-Yvelines at the Vélodrome de Saint-Quentin-en-Yvelines from 18–22 February 2015. A team of 20 cyclists (8 women, 12 men) was announced to represent the country in the event.

=== Men ===
Name	Event	Result	Rank
Matthew Glaetzer	Men's sprint	9.703 (Q),	5
Jacob Schmid	Men's sprint	9.777 (Q),	13
Peter Lewis	Men's sprint	9.830 (Q),	12
Jack Bobridge	Men's individual pursuit	4:16.219 (Q), 4:18.915	2nd place, silver medalist(s)
Alexander Edmondson	Men's individual pursuit	4:23.272	8
Miles Scotson	Men's individual pursuit	4:23.480	9
Scott Law	Men's scratch	—N/a	12
Scott Law	Men's points race	18 points	7
Glenn O'Shea	Men's omnium	190 points	2nd place, silver medalist(s)
Matthew Glaetzer	Men's keirin		10
Shane Perkins	Men's keirin		17
Jacob Schmid	Men's keirin		13
Jack Bobridge; Glenn O'Shea	Men's madison	8 points	7
Jack Bobridge; Alexander Edmondson; Mitchell Mulhern; Miles Scotson	Men's team pursuit	3:58.900 (Q),	3rd place, bronze medalist(s)
Matthew Glaetzer; Nathan Hart; Shane Perkins	Men's team sprint	43.379	6

=== Women ===
Name	Event	Result	Rank
Stephanie Morton	Women's sprint	10.754 (Q),	4
Anna Meares	Women's sprint	10.849 (Q),	9
Anna Meares	Women's 500 m time trial	33.425	2nd place, silver medalist(s)
Rebecca Wiasak	Women's individual pursuit	3:27.018 (Q),	1st place, gold medalist(s)
Amy Cure	Women's individual pursuit	3:29.794 (q), 3:32.907	3rd place, bronze medalist(s)
Annette Edmondson	Women's omnium	192 points	1st place, gold medalist(s)
Amy Cure	Women's scratch	—N/a	2nd place, silver medalist(s)
Annette Edmondson; Ashlee Ankudinoff; Amy Cure; Melissa Hoskins	Women's team pursuit	4:18.135 (Q),	1st place, gold medalist(s)
Kaarle McCulloch; Anna Meares	Women's team sprint	32.878 (q),	3rd place, bronze medalist(s)
Anna Meares	Women's keirin		1st place, gold medalist(s)
Stephanie Morton	Women's keirin		6

== 2016 results ==
Australia competed at the 2016 UCI Track Cycling World Championships at the Lee Valley VeloPark in London, United Kingdom from 2-4 March 2016. A team of 20 cyclists (8 women, 12 men) was announced to represent the country in the event.

=== Men ===
Name	Event	Result	Rank
Matthew Glaetzer	Men's sprint		2
Patrick Constable	Men's sprint		25
Jacob Schmid	Men's sprint		26
Michael Hepburn	Men's individual pursuit	261.865	8
Matthew Glaetzer	Men's keirin	—N/a	13
Jacob Schmid	Men's keirin	—N/a	17
Glenn O'Shea	Men's scratch	—N/a	15
Sam Welsford	Men's points race	7 points	7
Nathan Hart; Matthew Glaetzer; Patrick Constable	Men's team sprint	43.497	5
Sam Welsford; Michael Hepburn; Alexander Porter; Miles Scotson; Alexander Porter; Luke Davison	Men's team pursuit		1
Cameron Meyer; Callum Scotson	Men's madison	10 points	5

=== Women ===
Name	Event	Result	Rank
Anna Meares	Women's sprint		4
Stephanie Morton	Women's sprint		8
Kaarle Mcculloch	Women's sprint		15
Rebecca Wiasak	Women's individual pursuit	03:31.287(q), 03:34.099 (f)	1
Anna Meares	Women's keirin		2
Stephanie Morton	Women's keirin		7
Kaarle Mcculloch	Women's keirin		8
Georgia Baker	Women's points race	13 points	4
Annette Edmondson	Women's omnium	158 points	5
Annette Edmondson; Georgia Baker; Ashlee Ankudinoff; Amy Cure	Women's team pursuit	04:20.830 (q), opponent caught (f)	5
Anna Meares; Stephanie Morton	Women's team sprint	32.820 (q), 32.871 (f)	4

== See also ==
- Australia at the 2008 UCI Track Cycling World Championships
- Cuba at the UCI Track Cycling World Championships
- Netherlands at the UCI Track Cycling World Championships
