= South Africa at the UCI Track Cycling World Championships =

South Africa at the 2015 UCI Track Cycling World Championships
- IOC code: RSA

in Saint-Quentin-en-Yvelines, France 18 February – 22 February 2015
- Competitors: 3
- Medals Ranked -th: Gold 0 Silver 0 Bronze 0 Total 0

UCI Track Cycling World Championships appearances (overview)
- Overview page Recent: 2008; 2009; 2010; 2011; 2012; 2013; 2014; 2015; 2016; 2017; 2018; 2019; 2020; 2021; 2022; 2023; 2024; 2025

South Africa competed at the 2015 UCI Track Cycling World Championships in Saint-Quentin-en-Yvelines at the Vélodrome de Saint-Quentin-en-Yvelines from 18–22 February 2015. A team of 3 cyclists (2 women, 1 men) was announced to represent the country in the event.

== Results ==
=== Men ===
Name	Event	Result	Rank
Eugene Soule	Men's 1 km time trial	1:08.422	19

=== Women ===
Name	Event	Result	Rank
Annerine Wenhold	Women's 500 m time trial	39.054	21
Maroesjka Matthee	Women's individual pursuit	3:54.856	21
Maroesjka Matthee	Women's scratch	—	20

== 2016 UCI Track Cycling World Championships ==
South Africa at the 2016 UCI Track Cycling World Championships
- IOC code: RSA

in London, United Kingdom 2 March – 6 March 2016
- Competitors: 1 (1 men, 0 women)

UCI Track Cycling World Championships appearances (overview)
- Recent: 2008; 2009; 2010; 2011; 2012; 2013; 2014; 2015; 2016; 2017; 2018; 2019; 2020; 2021; 2022; 2023; 2024; 2025

South Africa competed at the 2016 UCI Track Cycling World Championships at the Lee Valley VeloPark in London, United Kingdom from 2–4 March 2016. A team of 1 cyclists (0 women, 1 men) was announced to represent the country in the event.

== Results ==
=== Men ===
Name	Event	Result	Rank
Jean Spies	Men's scratch	—	DNF
