= Brazil at the UCI Track Cycling World Championships =

Brazil at the UCI Track Cycling World Championships was represented by four male cyclists at both the 2015 and 2016 UCI Track Cycling World Championships. Brazil won no medals at either championship. In 2015, Gideoni Monteiro finished 15th in the men's omnium, while the men's team sprint squad also placed 15th. In 2016, Kacio Freitas finished 14th in the men's 1 km time trial and the team sprint squad placed 14th.

== 2015 UCI Track Cycling World Championships ==
Brazil at the 2015 UCI Track Cycling World Championships
- IOC code: BRA

in Saint-Quentin-en-Yvelines, France 18 February – 22 February 2015
- Competitors: 4
- Medals Ranked -th: Gold 0 Silver 0 Bronze 0 Total 0

UCI Track Cycling World Championships appearances (overview)
- Overview page Recent: 2009; 2010; 2011; 2012; 2013; 2014; 2015; 2016; 2017; 2018; 2019; 2020; 2021; 2022; 2023; 2024; 2025; 2026

Brazil competed at the 2015 UCI Track Cycling World Championships in Saint-Quentin-en-Yvelines at the Vélodrome de Saint-Quentin-en-Yvelines from 18 to 22 February 2015. A team of 4 cyclists (0 women, 4 men) was announced to represent the country in the event.

== Results ==
=== Men ===
Name	Event	Result	Rank
Flavio Cipriano	Men's sprint	10.146	32
Gideoni Monteiro	Men's omnium	112 points	15
Flavio Cipriano; Kacio Freitas; Hugo Osteti	Men's team sprint	44.849	15

== 2016 UCI Track Cycling World Championships ==
Brazil at the 2016 UCI Track Cycling World Championships
- IOC code: BRA

in London, United Kingdom 2 March – 6 March 2016
- Competitors: 4
- Medals: Gold 0 Silver 0 Bronze 0 Total 0

UCI Track Cycling World Championships appearances (overview)
- Recent: 2009; 2010; 2011; 2012; 2013; 2014; 2015; 2016; 2017; 2018; 2019; 2020; 2021; 2022; 2023; 2024; 2025; 2026

Brazil competed at the 2016 UCI Track Cycling World Championships at the Lee Valley VeloPark in London, United Kingdom from 2–4 March 2016. A team of 4 cyclists (4 men) was announced to represent the country in the event.

== Results ==
=== Men ===
Name	Event	Result	Rank
Kacio Freitas	Men's 1 km time trial	1:04.202	14
Gideoni Monteiro	Men's omnium	50 points	18
Flavio Cipriano; Kacio Freitas; Hugo Osteti	Men's team sprint	45.557	14
