= 2015 UCI Track Cycling World Championships – Men's team sprint =

Men's team sprint at the 2015 UCI Track Cycling World Championships
- Venue: Vélodrome de Saint-Quentin-en-Yvelines, Saint-Quentin-en-Yvelines
- Date: 18 February 2015
- Competitors: 48 from 16 nations
- Winning time: 42.808

Medalists
gold medal	Grégory Baugé; Michaël D'Almeida; Kévin Sireau	France
silver medal	Eddie Dawkins; Ethan Mitchell; Sam Webster	New Zealand
bronze medal	Joachim Eilers; René Enders; Robert Förstemann	Germany

The Men's team sprint event of the 2015 UCI Track Cycling World Championships was held on 18 February 2015.

== Results ==
=== Qualifying ===
The qualifying was held at 20:20.

Rank	Name	Nation	Time	Notes
1	Eddie Dawkins; Ethan Mitchell; Sam Webster	New Zealand	42.892	Q
2	Grégory Baugé; Michaël D'Almeida; Kévin Sireau	France	43.072	Q
3	Joachim Eilers; René Enders; Robert Förstemann	Germany	43.136	q
4	Denis Dmitriev; Nikita Shurshin; Pavel Yakushevskiy	Russia	43.317	q
5	Matthijs Büchli; Hugo Haak; Jeffrey Hoogland	Netherlands	43.326	
6	Matthew Glaetzer; Nathan Hart; Shane Perkins	Australia	43.379	
7	Krzysztof Maksel; Rafał Sarnecki; Damian Zieliński	Poland	43.481	
8	Philip Hindes; Jason Kenny; Callum Skinner	Great Britain	43.808	
9	Hersony Canelón; César Marcano; Ángel Pulgar	Venezuela	43.982	
10	Im Chae-bin; Kang Dong-jin; Son Je-yong	South Korea	44.149	
11	Kazuki Amagai; Seiichiro Nakagawa; Kazunari Watanabe	Japan	44.190	
12	Bao Saifei; Hu Ke; Xu Chao	China	44.253	
13	Hugo Barrette; Evan Carey; Joseph Veloce	Canada	44.428	
14	Sergio Aliaga; José Moreno; Juan Peralta	Spain	44.835	
15	Flavio Cipriano; Kacio Freitas; Hugo Osteti	Brazil	44.849	
16	Rubén Murillo; Anderson Parra; Julián Suárez	Colombia	44.865	

=== Finals ===
The finals were started at 21:35.

Rank	Name	Nation	Time	Notes
Gold medal race
1st place, gold medalist(s)	Grégory Baugé; Michaël D'Almeida; Kévin Sireau	France	43.136	
2nd place, silver medalist(s)	Eddie Dawkins; Ethan Mitchell; Sam Webster	New Zealand	REL; ~~42.808~~	
Bronze medal race
3rd place, bronze medalist(s)	Joachim Eilers; René Enders; Robert Förstemann	Germany	43.339	
4	Denis Dmitriev; Nikita Shurshin; Pavel Yakushevskiy	Russia	43.468	
