= South Korea at the UCI Track Cycling World Championships =

South Korea at the UCI Track Cycling World Championships was represented at the 2015 and 2016 UCI Track Cycling World Championships. In 2015, Im Chae-bin finished eighth in the men's 1 km time trial and Lee Hye-jin placed ninth in the women's keirin, while the men's team sprint squad finished tenth. In 2016, Lee achieved South Korea's best result with sixth place in the women's keirin; Im finished ninth in the men's keirin, and the men's team sprint squad placed eleventh. South Korea won no medals at either championship.

== 2015 ==
South Korea at the 2015 UCI Track Cycling World Championships
- IOC code: KOR

in Saint-Quentin-en-Yvelines, France 18 February – 22 February 2015
- Competitors: 4
- Medals Ranked -th: Gold 0 Silver 0 Bronze 0 Total 0

UCI Track Cycling World Championships appearances (overview)
- Overview page Recent: 2009; 2010; 2011; 2012; 2013; 2014; 2015; 2016; 2017; 2018; 2019; 2020; 2021; 2022; 2023; 2024; 2025; 2026

South Korea competed at the 2015 UCI Track Cycling World Championships in Saint-Quentin-en-Yvelines at the Vélodrome de Saint-Quentin-en-Yvelines from 18 to 22 February 2015. A team of 4 cyclists (3 women, 3 men) was announced to represent the country in the event.

== Results ==
=== Men ===
Name	Event	Result	Rank
Im Chae-bin	Men's 1 km time trial	1:01.103	8
Im Chae-bin; Kang Dong-jin; Son Je-yong	Men's team sprint	44.149	10

=== Women ===
Name	Event	Result	Rank
Lee Hye-jin	Women's keirin		9

== 2016 ==
South Korea at the 2016 UCI Track Cycling World Championships
- IOC code: KOR

in London, United Kingdom 2 March – 6 March 2016
- Competitors: 6 (5 men, 1 women)
- Medals: Gold 0 Silver 0 Bronze 0 Total 0

UCI Track Cycling World Championships appearances (overview)
- Recent: 2009; 2010; 2011; 2012; 2013; 2014; 2015; 2016; 2017; 2018; 2019; 2020; 2021; 2022; 2023; 2024; 2025; 2026

South Korea competed at the 2016 UCI Track Cycling World Championships at the Lee Valley VeloPark in London, United Kingdom from 2–4 March 2016. A team of 6 cyclists (1 women, 5 men) was announced to represent the country in the event.

== Results ==
=== Men ===
Name	Event	Result	Rank
Dong Jin Kang	Men's sprint		34
Chaebin Im	Men's 1 km time trial	01:02.666	12
Chaebin Im	Men's keirin	—N/a	9
Son Je-yong; Kang Dong-jin; Im Chae-bin	Men's team sprint	44.767	11

=== Women ===
Name	Event	Result	Rank
Hyejin Lee	Women's keirin		6
