= Evan Carey =

Canadian track cyclist (born 1994)

Personal information
- Born: 29 March 1994 (age 32) Victoria, British Columbia, Canada

Cycling career
- Sport: Cycling
- Discipline: Track cycling
- Role: Rider
- Rider type: team sprint
Medal record
Men's track cycling
Representing Canada
Pan American Games
Gold medal – first place	2015 Toronto	Team sprint
Pan American Championships
Silver medal – second place	2015 Santiago	Team sprint

Evan Carey (born 29 March 1994) is a Canadian track cyclist. He competed in the team sprint event at the 2015 UCI Track Cycling World Championships.
