= Venezuela at the UCI Track Cycling World Championships =

This page is an overview of Venezuela at the UCI Track Cycling World Championships.

== 2015 UCI Track Cycling World Championships ==
Venezuela at the 2015 UCI Track Cycling World Championships
- IOC code: VEN

in Saint-Quentin-en-Yvelines, France 18 February – 22 February 2015
- Competitors: 5
- Medals Ranked -th: Gold 0 Silver 0 Bronze 0 Total 0

UCI Track Cycling World Championships appearances (overview)
- Overview page Recent: 2009; 2010; 2011; 2012; 2013; 2014; 2015; 2016; 2017; 2018; 2019; 2020; 2021; 2022; 2023; 2024; 2025; 2026

Venezuela competed at the 2015 UCI Track Cycling World Championships in Saint-Quentin-en-Yvelines at the Vélodrome de Saint-Quentin-en-Yvelines from 18–22 February 2015. A team of 5 cyclists (2 women, 3 men) was announced to represent the country in the event.

== Results ==
=== Men ===
Name	Event	Result	Rank
Hersony Canelón	Men's sprint	9.833 (Q),	8
Ángel Pulgar	Men's sprint	10.275	34
Hersony Canelón; César Marcano; Ángel Pulgar	Men's team sprint	43.982	9

=== Women ===
Name	Event	Result	Rank
Mariaesthela Vilera	Women's 500 m time trial	35.926	19

== 2016 UCI Track Cycling World Championships ==
Venezuela at the 2016 UCI Track Cycling World Championships
- IOC code: VEN

in London, United Kingdom 2 March – 6 March 2016
- Competitors: 6 (5 men, 1 women)
- Medals: Gold 0 Silver 0 Bronze 0 Total 0

UCI Track Cycling World Championships appearances (overview)
- Recent: 2009; 2010; 2011; 2012; 2013; 2014; 2015; 2016; 2017; 2018; 2019; 2020; 2021; 2022; 2023; 2024; 2025; 2026

Venezuela competed at the 2016 UCI Track Cycling World Championships at the Lee Valley VeloPark in London, United Kingdom from 2–4 March 2016. A team of 6 cyclists (1 woman, 5 men) was announced to represent the country in the event.

== Results ==
=== Men ===
Name	Event	Result	Rank
Hersony Canelon	Men's keirin	—N/a	20
César Marcano; Hersony Canelón; Ángel Pulgar	Men's team sprint	44.654	10

=== Women ===
Name	Event	Result	Rank
Angie Sabrina Gonzalez	Women's omnium	67 points	17
