= Austria at the UCI Track Cycling World Championships =

Austria at the UCI Track Cycling World Championships was represented by Andreas Graf and Andreas Müller at both the 2015 and 2016 UCI Track Cycling World Championships. In 2015, the two competed in the men's scratch, points race, and madison events without winning a medal. In 2016, Graf won the silver medal in the men's points race with 48 points, while Müller finished 14th in the scratch and the pair placed 10th in the madison.

== 2015 UCI Track Cycling World Championships ==
Austria at the 2015 UCI Track Cycling World Championships
- IOC code: AUT

in Saint-Quentin-en-Yvelines, France 18 February – 22 February 2015
- Competitors: 2
- Medals Ranked -th: Gold 0 Silver 0 Bronze 0 Total 0

UCI Track Cycling World Championships appearances (overview)
- Overview page Recent: 2009; 2010; 2011; 2012; 2013; 2014; 2015; 2016; 2017; 2018; 2019; 2020; 2021; 2022; 2023; 2024; 2025; 2026

Austria competed at the 2015 UCI Track Cycling World Championships in Saint-Quentin-en-Yvelines at the Vélodrome de Saint-Quentin-en-Yvelines from 18–22 February 2015. A team of 2 cyclists (0 women, 2 men) was announced to represent the country in the event.

=== Results ===
==== Men ====
Name	Event	Result	Rank
Andreas Müller	Men's scratch	—N/a	9
Andreas Graf	Men's points race	0 points	18
Andreas Graf; Andreas Müller	Men's madison	2 points	9

== 2016 UCI Track Cycling World Championships ==
Austria at the 2016 UCI Track Cycling World Championships
- IOC code: AUT

in London, United Kingdom 2 March – 6 March 2016
- Competitors: 2 (2 men, 0 women)
- Medals: Gold 0 Silver 0 Bronze 0 Total 0

UCI Track Cycling World Championships appearances (overview)
- Recent: 2009; 2010; 2011; 2012; 2013; 2014; 2015; 2016; 2017; 2018; 2019; 2020; 2021; 2022; 2023; 2024; 2025; 2026

Austria competed at the 2016 UCI Track Cycling World Championships at the Lee Valley VeloPark in London, United Kingdom from 2–4 March 2016. A team of 2 cyclists (0 women, 2 men) was announced to represent the country in the event.

=== Results ===
==== Men ====
Name	Event	Result	Rank
Andreas Müller; Andreas Graf	Men's madison	1 points (-1 laps down)	10
Andreas Mueller	Men's scratch	—N/a	14
Andreas Graf	Men's points race	48 points	2
