= Julián Suárez =

Colombian cyclist

Cycling career
- Sport: Cycling
- Discipline: Track cycling
- Role: Rider
- Rider type: team sprint

Julián Suárez is a Colombian male track cyclist. He competed in the team sprint event at the 2015 UCI Track Cycling World Championships.
