= 2016 UCI Track Cycling World Championships – Men's 1 km time trial =

Men's 1 km time trial at the 2016 UCI Track Cycling World Championships
- Venue: Lee Valley VeloPark, London
- Date: 3 March 2016
- Competitors: 15 from 12 nations
- Winning time: 1:00.042

Medalists
gold medal	Joachim Eilers	Germany
silver medal	Theo Bos	Netherlands
bronze medal	Quentin Lafargue	France

The Men's 1 km time trial event of the 2016 UCI Track Cycling World Championships was held on 3 March 2016. Joachim Eilers won the gold medal.

== Results ==
The race was started at 14:49.

Rank	Name	Nation	Time	Behind	Notes
1st place, gold medalist(s)	Joachim Eilers	Germany	1:00.042		
2nd place, silver medalist(s)	Theo Bos	Netherlands	1:00.461	+0.419	
3rd place, bronze medalist(s)	Quentin Lafargue	France	1:01.581	+1.539	
4	Krzysztof Maksel	Poland	1:01.597	+1.555	
5	Matthew Crampton	Great Britain	1:01.669	+1.627	
6	Matt Archibald	New Zealand	1:01.718	+1.676	
7	Tomáš Bábek	Czech Republic	1:01.962	+1.920	
8	Robin Wagner	Czech Republic	1:02.206	+2.164	
9	Santiago Ramírez	Colombia	1:02.207	+2.185	
10	Maximilian Dornbach	Germany	1:02.425	+2.383	
11	José Moreno Sánchez	Spain	1:02.550	+2.508	
12	Im Chae-bin	South Korea	1:02.666	+2.624	
13	Mateusz Lipa	Poland	1:02.908	+2.866	
14	Kacio Freitas	Brazil	1:04.202	+4.160	
15	Mika Simola	Finland	1:04.641	+4.599	NR
