= 2015 UCI Track Cycling World Championships – Men's sprint =

Men's sprint at the 2015 UCI Track Cycling World Championships
- Venue: Vélodrome de Saint-Quentin-en-Yvelines, Saint-Quentin-en-Yvelines
- Date: 21–22 February 2015
- Competitors: 34 from 17 nations

Medalists
gold medal	Grégory Baugé	France
silver medal	Denis Dmitriev	Russia
bronze medal	Quentin Lafargue	France

The Men's sprint event of the 2015 UCI Track Cycling World Championships was held on 21–22 February 2015.

== Results ==
=== Qualifying ===
The qualifying was held at 13:00.

Rank	Name	Nation	Time	Notes
1	Stefan Bötticher	Germany	9.641	Q
2	Grégory Baugé	France	9.676	Q
3	Eddie Dawkins	New Zealand	9.681	Q
4	Jeffrey Hoogland	Netherlands	9.692	Q
5	Matthew Glaetzer	Australia	9.703	Q
6	Quentin Lafargue	France	9.768	Q
7	François Pervis	France	9.772	Q
8	Jacob Schmid	Australia	9.777	Q
9	Michaël D'Almeida	France	9.796	Q
10	Jason Kenny	Great Britain	9.804	Q
11	Pavel Kelemen	Czech Republic	9.825	Q
12	Denis Dmitriev	Russia	9.827	Q
13	Nikita Shurshin	Russia	9.829	Q
14	Peter Lewis	Australia	9.830	Q
15	Hersony Canelón	Venezuela	9.833	Q
16	Juan Peralta	Spain	9.845	Q
17	Sam Webster	New Zealand	9.848	Q
18	Xu Chao	China	9.876	Q
19	Seiichiro Nakagawa	Japan	9.877	Q
20	Robert Förstemann	Germany	9.877	Q
21	Damian Zieliński	Poland	9.905	Q
22	Eoin Mullen	Ireland	9.939	Q
23	Callum Skinner	Great Britain	9.983	Q
24	Joseph Veloce	Canada	9.992	Q
25	Adam Ptáčník	Czech Republic	9.996	
26	Hugo Barrette	Canada	10.033	
27	Kazunari Watanabe	Japan	10.038	
28	Anderson Parra	Colombia	10.048	
29	Hugo Haak	Netherlands	10.088	
30	Tomoyuki Kawabata	Japan	10.089	
31	Mateusz Lipa	Poland	10.100	
32	Flavio Cipriano	Brazil	10.146	
33	José Moreno	Spain	10.218	
34	Ángel Pulgar	Venezuela	10.275	
	Fabián Puerta	Colombia	DNS	

=== 1/16 finals ===
The 1/16 finals were held at 14:05.

Heat	Rank	Name	Nation	Gap	Notes
1	1	Stefan Bötticher	Germany		Q
1	2	Joseph Veloce	Canada	+0.342	
2	1	Grégory Baugé	France		Q
2	2	Callum Skinner	Great Britain	+0.337	
3	1	Eddie Dawkins	New Zealand		Q
3	2	Eoin Mullen	Ireland	+0.105	
4	1	Jeffrey Hoogland	Netherlands		Q
4	2	Damian Zieliński	Poland	+0.190	
5	1	Matthew Glaetzer	Australia		Q
5	2	Robert Förstemann	Germany	+0.035	
6	1	Quentin Lafargue	France		Q
6	2	Seiichiro Nakagawa	Japan	+0.093	
7	1	François Pervis	France		Q
7	2	Xu Chao	China	+0.036	
8	1	Sam Webster	New Zealand		Q
8	2	Jacob Schmid	Australia	+0.515	
9	1	Michaël D'Almeida	France		Q
9	2	Juan Peralta	Spain	+0.020	
10	1	Hersony Canelón	Venezuela		Q
10	2	Jason Kenny	Great Britain	+0.043	
11	1	Peter Lewis	Australia		Q
11	2	Pavel Kelemen	Czech Republic	+0.055	
12	1	Denis Dmitriev	Russia		Q
12	2	Nikita Shurshin	Russia	+0.036	

=== 1/8 finals ===
The 1/8 finals were held at 15:15.

Heat	Rank	Name	Nation	Gap	Notes
1	1	Denis Dmitriev	Russia		Q
1	2	Stefan Bötticher	Germany	+0.078	
2	1	Grégory Baugé	France		Q
2	2	Peter Lewis	Australia	+0.075	
3	1	Hersony Canelón	Venezuela		Q
3	2	Eddie Dawkins	New Zealand	+0.029	
4	1	Jeffrey Hoogland	Netherlands		Q
4	2	Michaël D'Almeida	France	+0.094	
5	1	Matthew Glaetzer	Australia		Q
5	2	Sam Webster	New Zealand	+0.017	
6	1	Quentin Lafargue	France		Q
6	2	François Pervis	France	+0.530	

=== 1/8 finals repechage ===
1/8 finals repechage was held at 16:35.

Heat	Rank	Name	Nation	Gap	Notes
1	1	François Pervis	France		Q
1	2	Michaël D'Almeida	France	+0.032	
1	3	Stefan Bötticher	Germany	+0.065	
2	1	Sam Webster	New Zealand		Q
2	2	Eddie Dawkins	New Zealand	+0.277	
2	3	Peter Lewis	Australia	+0.971	

=== Quarterfinals ===
Race 1 was started at 11:25, Race 2 at 12:00 and Race 3 at 12:35.

Heat	Rank	Name	Nation	Race 1	Race 2	Decider	Notes
1	1	Denis Dmitriev	Russia	X	X		Q
1	2	Sam Webster	New Zealand	+0.192	+0.011		
2	1	Grégory Baugé	France	+0.078	X	X	Q
2	2	François Pervis	France	X	+0.027	+0.902	
3	1	Quentin Lafargue	France	X	X		Q
3	2	Hersony Canelón	Venezuela	+0.044	+0.850		
4	1	Jeffrey Hoogland	Netherlands	X	X		Q
4	2	Matthew Glaetzer	Australia	+0.026	+0.044		

=== Race for 5th–8th places ===
The race for 5th–8th places was held at 13:05 .

Rank	Name	Nation	Gap
5	Matthew Glaetzer	Australia	
6	Sam Webster	New Zealand	+0.004
7	François Pervis	France	+0.319
8	Hersony Canelón	Venezuela	+0.343

=== Semifinals ===
Race 1 was held at 14:00, Race 2 at 14:45 and Race 3 at 15:05.

Heat	Rank	Name	Nation	Race 1	Race 2	Decider	Notes
1	1	Denis Dmitriev	Russia	X	+0.017	X	Q
1	2	Jeffrey Hoogland	Netherlands	+0.078	X	+0.139	
2	1	Grégory Baugé	France	X	X		Q
2	2	Quentin Lafargue	France	+0.032	+0.060		

=== Finals ===
Race 1 was held at 15:30, Race 2 at 16:40 and Race 3 at 17:00.

Rank	Name	Nation	Race 1	Race 2	Decider
Gold Medal Races
1st place, gold medalist(s)	Grégory Baugé	France	X	X	
2nd place, silver medalist(s)	Denis Dmitriev	Russia	+0.053	+0.036	
Bronze Medal Races
3rd place, bronze medalist(s)	Quentin Lafargue	France	X	+0.137	X
4	Jeffrey Hoogland	Netherlands	REL	X	+0.041
