= Slovakia at the UCI Track Cycling World Championships =

Slovakia at the UCI Track Cycling World Championships was represented by Alžbeta Pavlendová at both the 2015 and 2016 UCI Track Cycling World Championships. She was Slovakia's sole competitor at both championships and competed in the women's scratch and points race. In 2015, Pavlendová finished fifth in the scratch and 14th in the points race; in 2016, she finished 18th and 16th, respectively. Slovakia won no medals at either championship.

== 2015 ==
Slovakia at the 2015 UCI Track Cycling World Championships
- IOC code: SVK

in Saint-Quentin-en-Yvelines, France 18 February – 22 February 2015
- Competitors: 1
- Medals Ranked -th: Gold 0 Silver 0 Bronze 0 Total 0

UCI Track Cycling World Championships appearances (overview)
- Overview page Recent: 2009; 2010; 2011; 2012; 2013; 2014; 2015; 2016; 2017; 2018; 2019; 2020; 2021; 2022; 2023; 2024; 2025; 2026

Slovakia competed at the 2015 UCI Track Cycling World Championships in Saint-Quentin-en-Yvelines at the Vélodrome de Saint-Quentin-en-Yvelines from 18–22 February 2015. A team of 1 cyclists (1 women, 0 men) was announced to represent the country in the event.

== Results ==
=== Women ===
| Name | Event | Result | Rank |
|---|---|---|---|
| Alžbeta Pavlendová | Women's points race | 2 points | 14 |
| Alžbeta Pavlendová | Women's scratch | —N/a | 5 |

== 2016 ==
Slovakia at the 2016 UCI Track Cycling World Championships
- IOC code: SVK

in London, United Kingdom 2 March – 6 March 2016
- Competitors: 1 (0 men, 1 women)
- Medals: Gold 0 Silver 0 Bronze 0 Total 0

UCI Track Cycling World Championships appearances (overview)
- Recent: 2009; 2010; 2011; 2012; 2013; 2014; 2015; 2016; 2017; 2018; 2019; 2020; 2021; 2022; 2023; 2024; 2025; 2026

Slovakia competed at the 2016 UCI Track Cycling World Championships at the Lee Valley VeloPark in London, United Kingdom from 2–4 March 2016. A team of 1 cyclists (1 women, 0 men) was announced to represent the country in the event.

== Results ==
=== Women ===
| Name | Event | Result | Rank |
|---|---|---|---|
| Alzbeta Pavlendova | Women's scratch | —N/a | 18 |
| Alzbeta Pavlendova | Women's points race | 0 points | 16 |
