= Portugal at the UCI Track Cycling World Championships =

Portugal has competed at the UCI Track Cycling World Championships.

== 2015 ==
Portugal at the 2015 UCI Track Cycling World Championships
- IOC code: POR

in Saint-Quentin-en-Yvelines, France 18 February – 22 February 2015
- Competitors: 3
- Medals Ranked -th: Gold 0 Silver 0 Bronze 0 Total 0

UCI Track Cycling World Championships appearances (overview)
- Overview page Recent: 2008; 2009; 2010; 2011; 2012; 2013; 2014; 2015; 2016; 2017; 2018; 2019; 2020; 2021; 2022; 2023; 2024; 2025

In Saint-Quentin-en-Yvelines at the Vélodrome de Saint-Quentin-en-Yvelines from 18–22 February 2015, the championships were held. A team of 3 cyclists (0 women, 3 men) was announced to represent the country in the event.

=== Results ===
==== Men ====
Name	Event	Result	Rank
Rui Oliveira	Men's scratch	—	17

== 2016 ==
Portugal at the 2016 UCI Track Cycling World Championships
- IOC code: POR

in London, United Kingdom 2 March – 6 March 2016
- Competitors: 4 (4 men, 0 women)

UCI Track Cycling World Championships appearances (overview)
- Recent: 2008; 2009; 2010; 2011; 2012; 2013; 2014; 2015; 2016; 2017; 2018; 2019; 2020; 2021; 2022; 2023; 2024; 2025

Held at the Lee Valley VeloPark in London, United Kingdom from 2–4 March 2016, the Portugal's team at the championships consisted of 4 cyclists (0 women, 4 men) was announced to represent the country in the event.

=== Results ===
==== Men ====
Name	Event	Result	Rank
Rui Oliveira	Men's scratch	—	8
Ivo Oliveira	Men's points race	-35 points	DNF
