= Cycling at the 2015 Pan American Games – Men's team sprint =

Cycling – Men's team sprint at the 2015 Pan American Games
- Venue: Milton Velodrome
- Dates: July 16
- Competitors: 21 from 7 nations
- Winning Time Gold Medal Race: 44.241

Medalists
Gold medal	Hugo Barrette; Evan Carey; Joseph Veloce	Canada
Silver medal	Hersony Canelón; César Marcano; Ángel Pulgar	Venezuela
Bronze medal	Flavio Cipriano; Kacio Freitas; Hugo Osteti	Brazil

The men's team sprint competition of the cycling events at the 2015 Pan American Games was held on July 16 at the Milton Velodrome in Milton, Ontario.

== Schedule ==
All times are Eastern Standard Time (UTC-3).

Date	Time	Round
July 16, 2015	12:41	Qualifying
July 16, 2015	18:05	Final

== Results ==
=== Qualification ===
Rank	Nation	Name	Time	Notes
1	Canada	Hugo Barrette; Evan Carey; Joseph Veloce	44.242	Q
2	Venezuela	Hersony Canelón; César Marcano; Ángel Pulgar	44.715	Q
3	Brazil	Flavio Cipriano; Kacio Freitas; Hugo Osteti	44.918	Q
4	Colombia	Anderson Parra; Fabián Puerta; Santiago Ramírez	44.961	Q
5	Trinidad and Tobago	Jude Codrington; Justin Roberts; Njisane Phillip	45.381	
6	United States	Matthew Baranoski; David Espinoza; Danny Robertson	46.145	
7	Argentina	Mauro Agostini; Leandro Bottasso; Adrian Richeze	48.861	

=== Finals ===
==== Bronze Medal Race ====
Rank	Nation	Name	Time	Notes
3rd place, bronze medalist(s)	Brazil	Flavio Cipriano; Kacio Freitas; Hugo Osteti	44.769	
4	Colombia	Anderson Parra; Fabián Puerta; Santiago Ramírez	45.054	

==== Gold Medal Race ====
Rank	Nation	Name	Time	Notes
1st place, gold medalist(s)	Canada	Hugo Barrette; Evan Carey; Joseph Veloce	44.241	
2nd place, silver medalist(s)	Venezuela	Hersony Canelón; César Marcano; Ángel Pulgar	45.087	
