= Chinese Taipei at the UCI Track Cycling World Championships =

Chinese Taipei at the 2016 UCI Track Cycling World Championships
- IOC code: TPE

in London, United Kingdom 2 March – 6 March 2016
- Competitors: 1 (0 men, 1 women)

UCI Track Cycling World Championships appearances (overview)
- Recent: 2008; 2009; 2010; 2011; 2012; 2013; 2014; 2015; 2016; 2017; 2018; 2019; 2020; 2021; 2022; 2023; 2024; 2025

Chinese Taipei (Taiwan) competed at the 2016 UCI Track Cycling World Championships at the Lee Valley VeloPark in London, United Kingdom from 2–4 March 2016. A team of 1 cyclists (1 women, 0 men) was announced to represent the country in the event.

== Results ==
=== Women ===
| Name | Event | Result | Rank |
|---|---|---|---|
| Mei Yu Hsiao | Women's omnium | 82 points | 14 |
