= Denmark at the UCI Track Cycling World Championships =

This page is an overview of Denmark at the UCI Track Cycling World Championships.

== 2015 ==
Denmark at the 2015 UCI Track Cycling World Championships
- IOC code: DEN

in Saint-Quentin-en-Yvelines, France 18 February – 22 February 2015
- Competitors: 6
- Medals Ranked -th: Gold 0 Silver 0 Bronze 0 Total 0

UCI Track Cycling World Championships appearances (overview)
- Overview page Recent: 2008; 2009; 2010; 2011; 2012; 2013; 2014; 2015; 2016; 2017; 2018; 2019; 2020; 2021; 2022; 2023; 2024; 2025

Denmark competed at the 2015 UCI Track Cycling World Championships in Saint-Quentin-en-Yvelines at the Vélodrome de Saint-Quentin-en-Yvelines from 18–22 February 2015. A team of 6 cyclists (1 women, 5 men) was announced to represent the country in the event.

== Results ==
=== Men ===
Name	Event	Result	Rank
Casper Pedersen	Men's omnium	117 points	13
Casper van Folsach; Daniel Hartvig; Anders Holm; Rasmus Quaade	Men's team pursuit	4:03.520	11

=== Women ===
Name	Event	Result	Rank
Amalie Dideriksen	Women's omnium	108 points	12

== 2016 ==
Denmark at the 2016 UCI Track Cycling World Championships
- IOC code: DEN

in London, United Kingdom 2 March – 6 March 2016
- Competitors: 9 (8 men, 1 women)
- Medals: Gold 0 Silver 0 Bronze 1 Total 1

UCI Track Cycling World Championships appearances (overview)
- Recent: 2008; 2009; 2010; 2011; 2012; 2013; 2014; 2015; 2016; 2017; 2018; 2019; 2020; 2021; 2022; 2023; 2024; 2025

Denmark competed at the 2016 UCI Track Cycling World Championships at the Lee Valley VeloPark in London, United Kingdom from 2–4 March 2016. A team of 9 cyclists (1 women, 8 men) was announced to represent the country in the event.

== Results ==
=== Men ===
Name	Event	Result	Rank
Lasse Norman Hansen; Frederik Madsen; Rasmus Quaade; Casper von Folsach; Rasmus Quaade	Men's team pursuit		3
Alex Rasmussen; Jesper Mørkøv	Men's madison	2 points (-2 laps down)	12
Lasse Norman Hansen	Men's omnium	181 points	5

=== Women ===
Name	Event	Result	Rank
Amalie Dideriksen	Women's omnium	119 points	10
