= Annerine Wenhold =

South African cyclist

Personal information
- Born: 26 September 1973 (age 53)

Cycling career
- Sport: Cycling
- Role: Rider

Annerine Wenhold (born 26 September 1973) is a South African professional racing cyclist. She rode at the 2015 UCI Track Cycling World Championships.

== Major results ==
2015
African Track Championships

1st Sprint
1st Team Sprint
1st 500m Time Trial
