= 2016 UCI Track Cycling World Championships =

Cycling world championships

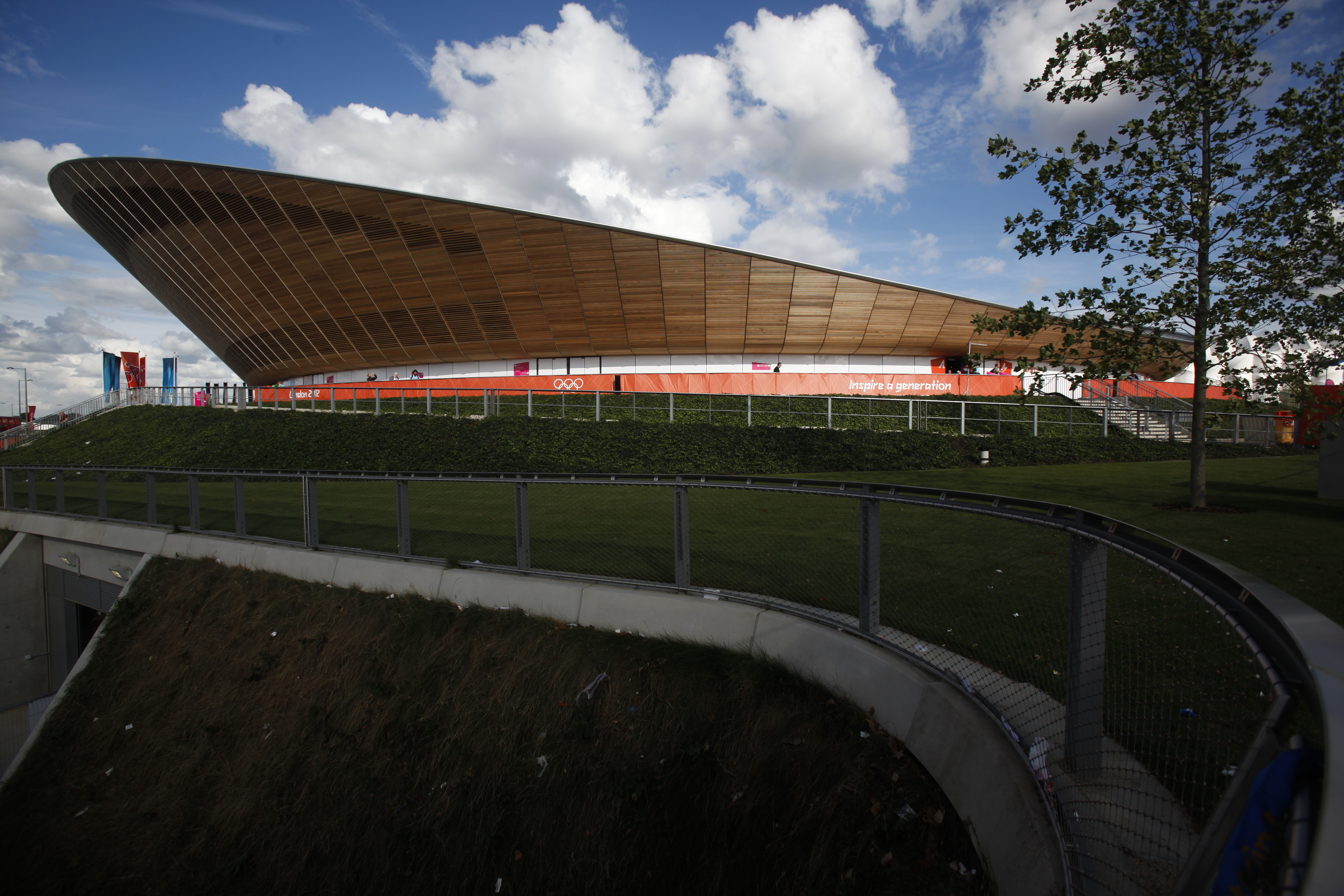
- Venue: London, Great Britain (United Kingdom)
- Date: 2–6 March
- Velodrome: Lee Valley VeloPark
- Nations participating: 45
- Cyclists participating: 390
- Events: 19

The 2016 UCI Track Cycling World Championships were the World Championships for track cycling in 2016. They took place in London in the Lee Valley VeloPark from 2–6 March 2016.

As the last major track cycling event prior to the 2016 Summer Olympics, the championships were particularly important for cyclists and national teams aiming to qualify for the track cycling competitions at Rio 2016. Hosts Great Britain finished top of the medals table with five gold, one silver and three bronze medals.

== Preparations ==
Tickets prices for the 12 different sessions ranged between £15 and £90, with student and over 60s discounts available. Higher priced tickets were tickets with better seating locations, afternoon (final) sessions and the sessions at the weekend. On 20 February 50,000 tickets were sold, with most of the sessions sold out.

For the championships 200 volunteers were recruited and helped in a variety of roles during set-up and across the event, from programme sellers and accreditation distributors to media and sports.

== Schedule ==
The schedule of events was as follows:

Competition	F	Final

Men
Date →	Wed 2		Thu 3		Fri 4		Sat 5		Sun 6	
Event ↓	A	E	A	E	A	E	A	E	A	E
Men's 1 km time trial			F							
Men's individual pursuit					Q	F				
Men's keirin									R1, R	R2, F
Men's omnium					SR, IP	ER	TT, FL	PR		
Men's points race						F				
Men's scratch		F								
Men's sprint					Q, ^{1}/_{16}, ^{1}/_{8}, R		QF	SF, F		
Men's team pursuit	Q		R1	F						
Men's team sprint	Q	F								
Men's madison										F

Women
Date →	Wed 2		Thu 3		Fri 4		Sat 5		Sun 6	
Event ↓	A	E	A	E	A	E	A	E	A	E
Women's 500 m time trial					F					
Women's individual pursuit	Q	F								
Women's keirin			R1, R	R2, F						
Women's omnium							SR, IP	ER	TT, FL	PR
Women's points race								F		
Women's scratch				F						
Women's sprint							Q, ^{1}/_{16}, ^{1}/_{8}, R		QF	SF, F
Women's team pursuit			Q		R1	F				
Women's team sprint	Q	F								

A = Afternoon session, E = Evening session
Q = qualifiers, R1 = first round, R2 = second round, R = repechages ^{1}/_{16} = sixteenth finals, ^{1}/_{8} = eighth finals, QF = quarterfinals, SF = semifinals
SR = Scratch Race, IP = Individual Pursuit, ER = Elimination Race, TT = Time Trial, FL = Flying Lap, PR = Points Race

== Medal summary ==
=== Medal table ===
Rank	Nation	Gold	Silver	Bronze	Total
1	Great Britain	5	1	3	9
2	Germany	3	2	3	8
3	Australia	2	2	1	5
4	Russia	2	0	1	3
5	China	1	2	0	3
6	New Zealand	1	1	0	2
6	Poland	1	1	0	2
8	Spain	1	0	1	2
8	United States	1	0	1	2
10	Colombia	1	0	0	1
10	Italy	1	0	0	1
12	Netherlands	0	3	1	4
13	Canada	0	2	2	4
14	France	0	2	1	3
15	Austria	0	1	0	1
15	Hong Kong	0	1	0	1
15	Mexico	0	1	0	1
18	Belgium	0	0	1	1
18	Cuba	0	0	1	1
18	Denmark	0	0	1	1
18	Malaysia	0	0	1	1
18	Switzerland	0	0	1	1
Totals (22 entries)		19	19	19	57

=== Medalists ===
Event	Gold	Silver	Bronze
Men's events
Sprint	Jason Kenny; Great Britain	Matthew Glaetzer; Australia	Denis Dmitriev; Russia
Team Sprint	New Zealand; Ethan Mitchell; Sam Webster; Eddie Dawkins	Netherlands; Nils van 't Hoenderdaal; Jeffrey Hoogland; Matthijs Büchli; Hugo Haak	Germany; René Enders; Max Niederlag; Joachim Eilers
Team Pursuit	Australia; Sam Welsford; Michael Hepburn; Callum Scotson; Miles Scotson; Alexander Porter; Luke Davison	Great Britain; Jonathan Dibben; Ed Clancy; Owain Doull; Bradley Wiggins; Steven Burke; Andy Tennant	Denmark; Lasse Norman Hansen; Niklas Larsen; Frederik Madsen; Casper von Folsach; Rasmus Quaade
Keirin	Joachim Eilers; Germany	Eddie Dawkins; New Zealand	Azizulhasni Awang; Malaysia
Omnium	Fernando Gaviria; Colombia	Roger Kluge; Germany	Glenn O'Shea; Australia
1 km Time Trial^{[O]}	Joachim Eilers; Germany	Theo Bos; Netherlands	Quentin Lafargue; France
Pursuit^{[O]}	Filippo Ganna; Italy	Domenic Weinstein; Germany	Andy Tennant; Great Britain
Scratch Race^{[O]}	Sebastián Mora; Spain	Ignacio Prado; Mexico	Claudio Imhof; Switzerland
Points Race^{[O]}	Jonathan Dibben; Great Britain	Andreas Graf; Austria	Kenny de Ketele; Belgium
Madison^{[N]}	Great Britain; Bradley Wiggins; Mark Cavendish	France; Morgan Kneisky; Benjamin Thomas	Spain; Sebastián Mora; Albert Torres
Women's events
Sprint	Zhong Tianshi; China	Lin Junhong; China	Kristina Vogel; Germany
Team Sprint	Russia; Daria Shmeleva; Anastasia Voynova	China; Gong Jinjie; Zhong Tianshi	Germany; Miriam Welte; Kristina Vogel
Team Pursuit	United States; Sarah Hammer; Kelly Catlin; Chloé Dygert; Jennifer Valente	Canada; Allison Beveridge; Jasmin Glaesser; Kirsti Lay; Georgia Simmerling	Great Britain; Laura Trott; Elinor Barker; Ciara Horne; Joanna Rowsell
Keirin	Kristina Vogel; Germany	Anna Meares; Australia	Becky James; Great Britain
Omnium	Laura Trott; Great Britain	Laurie Berthon; France	Sarah Hammer; United States
500 m Time Trial^{[O]}	Anastasia Voynova; Russia	Lee Wai Sze; Hong Kong	Elis Ligtlee; Netherlands
Pursuit^{[O]}	Rebecca Wiasak; Australia	Małgorzata Wojtyra; Poland	Annie Foreman-Mackey; Canada
Scratch Race^{[O]}	Laura Trott; Great Britain	Kirsten Wild; Netherlands	Stephanie Roorda; Canada
Points Race^{[O]}	Katarzyna Pawłowska; Poland	Jasmin Glaesser; Canada	Arlenis Sierra; Cuba

=== Notes ===
- Riders named in italics did not participate in the medal finals.
- ^{^{O}} In the Olympics, all shaded events (except the madison) are contested within the omnium only.
- ^{^{N}} The madison is not contested in the Olympics.

== Participating nations ==
390 cyclists from 45 countries were registered for the championships. The registered riders from Egypt and Morocco did not participate. The number of registered cyclists per nation is shown in parentheses. Note that not all registered riders competed at the championships.

Participating nations
Click on a nation to go to the nations' 2016 Championships page
- Australia (20)
- Austria (2)
- Azerbaijan (2)
- Belarus (8)
- Belgium (6)
- Brazil (5)
- Canada (15)
- Chile (1)
- China (20)
- Chinese Taipei (1)
- Colombia (7)
- Cuba (3)
- Czech Republic (9)
- Denmark (9)
- Egypt (1)
- Finland (1)
- France (18)
- Germany (21)
- Great Britain (21)
- Hong Kong (7)
- Hungary (1)
- India (1)
- Ireland (9)
- Italy (16)
- Japan (13)
- Kazakhstan (3)
- Lithuania (4)
- Morocco (18)
- Malaysia (2)
- Mexico (6)
- Netherlands (15)
- New Zealand (19)
- Poland (17)
- Portugal (4)
- Russia (20)
- South Africa (1)
- South Korea (6)
- Spain (15)
- Switzerland (7)
- Suriname (1)
- Slovakia (1)
- Trinidad and Tobago (1)
- Ukraine (9)
- United States (14)
- Venezuela (6)

== Broadcasting ==
List of broadcasters

Europe

- BBC: United Kingdom
- BeIN Sports: France, Monaco, Andorra & French speaking Africa
- Charlton: Israel
- Czech TV: Czech Republic
- France TV: France
- Match! Nash Sport: Russia
- NOS: Netherlands
- ORF: Austria
- Polsat: Poland
- Pro TV: Romania
- RAI: Italy
- RTBF: Belgium
- Slovak TV: Slovakia
- Sport 1: Hungary
- Sportklub: Serbia, Montenegro, Croatia, Bosnia, Kosovo, Macedonia, Slovenia
- SRG SSR: Switzerland
- TV2: Norway
- Viasat: Denmark, Estonia, Latvia, Finland, Lithuania,
- VRT: Belgium

North America/ Canada

- RDS: Canada
- Rogers Sportsnet: Canada
- Universal: USA

South America

- Globosat: Brazil
- TDN: PAN South America

Asia

- ASTRO: Malaysia
- I-Cable: Hong Kong
- NHK: Japan
- Sony India: India
- Sportcast: Taïwan
- SPOTV: Korea
- TrueVisions: Thailand

Africa

- Mnet Supersport: PAN-Africa

Australia

- SBS Australia: Australia
- Sky New Zealand: New Zealand

Worldwide

- SNTV: Worldwide
- Perform: Worldwide
