= Mexico at the UCI Track Cycling World Championships =

Mexico at the 2016 UCI Track Cycling World Championships
- IOC code: MEX

in London, United Kingdom 2 March – 6 March 2016
- Competitors: 6 (2 men, 4 women)
- Medals: Gold 0 Silver 1 Bronze 0 Total 1

Mexico competed at the UCI Track Cycling World Championships on various occasions.

== 2015 ==
The 2015 UCI Track Cycling World Championships were held in Saint-Quentin-en-Yvelines at the Vélodrome de Saint-Quentin-en-Yvelines from 18 to 22 February 2015. A team of 4 cyclists (4 women, 0 men) was announced to represent Mexico in the event.

=== Results ===
==== Women ====
Name	Event	Result	Rank
Luz Gaxiola	Women's sprint	11.200 (Q),	21
Luz Gaxiola	Women's 500 m time trial	35.803	17
Sofía Arreola	Women's points race	13 points	6
Lizbeth Salazar	Women's scratch	—	4
Frany Fong; Luz Gaxiola	Women's team sprint	34.614	11

== 2016 ==
Mexico participated in the 2016 event at Lee Valley VeloPark in London, United Kingdom from 2–4 March 2016. A team of 6 cyclists (4 women, 2 men) was announced to represent the country in the event.

=== Results ===
==== Men ====
Name	Event	Result	Rank
Ignacio Prado	Men's scratch	—	2

==== Women ====
Name	Event	Result	Rank
Daniela Gaxiola Gonzalez Luz	Women's sprint		24
Jessica Salazar Valles	Women's 500 m time trial	34.705 sec	10
Daniela Gaxiola Gonzalez Luz	Women's 500 m time trial	35.137 sec	13
Yareli Salazar	Women's scratch	—	12
Jessica Salazar; Luz Gaxiola	Women's team sprint	34.236	12
