= France at the UCI Track Cycling World Championships =

France at the 2015 UCI Track Cycling World Championships
- IOC code: FRA

in Saint-Quentin-en-Yvelines, France 18 February – 22 February 2015
- Competitors: 21
- Medals Ranked 1st: Gold 5 Silver 0 Bronze 2 Total 7

UCI Track Cycling World Championships appearances (overview)
- Overview page Recent: 2008; 2009; 2010; 2011; 2012; 2013; 2014; 2015; 2016; 2017; 2018; 2019; 2020; 2021; 2022; 2023; 2024; 2025

France competed at the 2015 UCI Track Cycling World Championships in Saint-Quentin-en-Yvelines at the Vélodrome de Saint-Quentin-en-Yvelines from 18 to 22 February 2015. A team of 21 cyclists (9 women, 12 men) was announced to represent the country in the event.

== Results ==
=== Men ===
Name	Event	Result	Rank
Grégory Baugé	Men's sprint	9.676 (Q),	1st place, gold medalist(s)
Quentin Lafargue	Men's sprint	9.768 (Q),	3rd place, bronze medalist(s)
François Pervis	Men's sprint	9.772 (Q),	7
Michaël D'Almeida	Men's sprint	9.796 (Q),	11
François Pervis	Men's 1 km time trial	1:00.207	1st place, gold medalist(s)
Quentin Lafargue	Men's 1 km time trial	1:00.648	4
Michaël D'Almeida	Men's 1 km time trial	1:01.036	6
Julien Morice	Men's individual pursuit	4:19.684 (q), 4:21.419	3rd place, bronze medalist(s)
Morgan Kneisky	Men's scratch	—	8
Benjamin Thomas	Men's points race	16 points	9
Thomas Boudat	Men's omnium	144 points	8
François Pervis	Men's keirin		1st place, gold medalist(s)
Michaël D'Almeida	Men's keirin		11
Bryan Coquard; Morgan Kneisky	Men's madison	21 points	1st place, gold medalist(s)
Bryan Coquard; Julien Duval; Damien Gaudin; Julien Morice	Men's team pursuit	4:00.783 (q),	7
Grégory Baugé; Michaël D'Almeida; Kévin Sireau	Men's team sprint	43.072 (Q), 43.136	1st place, gold medalist(s)

=== Women ===
Name	Event	Result	Rank
Virginie Cueff	Women's sprint	10.970 (Q),	14
Sandie Clair	Women's sprint	11.253 (Q),	23
Virginie Cueff	Women's 500 m time trial	33.926	6
Sandie Clair	Women's 500 m time trial	34.425	11
Élise Delzenne	Women's individual pursuit	3:36.730	9
Élise Delzenne	Women's points race	23 points	4
Laurie Berthon	Women's omnium	87 points	14
Pascale Jeuland	Women's scratch	—	REL
Soline Lamboley; Élise Delzenne; Eugénie Duval; Pascale Jeuland	Women's team pursuit	4:37.808	15
Sandie Clair; Olivia Montauban	Women's team sprint	33.476	6
Olivia Montauban	Women's keirin		13

== 2016 ==
France at the 2016 UCI Track Cycling World Championships
- IOC code: FRA

in London, United Kingdom 2 March – 6 March 2016
- Competitors: 18 (13 men, 5 women)
- Medals: Gold 0 Silver 0 Bronze 1 Total 1

UCI Track Cycling World Championships appearances (overview)
- Recent: 2008; 2009; 2010; 2011; 2012; 2013; 2014; 2015; 2016; 2017; 2018; 2019; 2020; 2021; 2022; 2023; 2024; 2025

France competed at the 2016 UCI Track Cycling World Championships at the Lee Valley VeloPark in London, United Kingdom from 2–4 March 2016. A team of 18 cyclists (5 women, 13 men) was announced to represent the country in the event.

== Results ==
=== Men ===
Name	Event	Result	Rank
Grégory Baugé	Men's sprint		6
Quentin Lafargue	Men's sprint		19
François Pervis	Men's sprint		22
Quentin Lafargue	Men's 1 km time trial	01:01.581	3
Thomas Denis	Men's individual pursuit	265.208	10
François Pervis	Men's keirin	—	12
Michaël D'Almeida	Men's keirin	—	20
Morgan Kneisky	Men's scratch	—	16
Benjamin Thomas	Men's points race	41 points	4
Grégory Baugé; Kévin Sireau; Michaël D'Almeida	Men's team sprint	43.487 (q), 43.577	4
Benjamin Thomas; Thomas Denis; Julien Duval; Florian Maitre	Men's team pursuit		11
Morgan Kneisky; Benjamin Thomas	Men's madison	14 points	2

=== Women ===
Name	Event	Result	Rank
Virginie Cueff	Women's sprint		11
Sandie Clair	Women's sprint		29
Élise Delzenne	Women's individual pursuit	03:39.600	6
Virginie Cueff	Women's keirin		10
Pascale Jeuland	Women's scratch	—	15
Élise Delzenne	Women's points race	1 points	15
Laurie Berthon	Women's omnium	183 points	2
Sandie Clair; Virginie Cueff	Women's team sprint	33.258	7
