= 2005 UCI Track Cycling World Championships – Women's points race =

Rainbow jersey

The Women's Points Race was one of the 6 women's events at the 2005 UCI Track Cycling World Championships, held in Los Angeles, United States.

15 Cyclists from 15 countries participated in the race. Because of the number of entries, there were no qualification rounds for this discipline. Consequently, the event was run direct to the final.

== Final ==
The Final and only race was run at 18:45 on April 14. The competition consisted on 100 laps, making a total of 25 km with 10 sprints.

Elapsed Time=34:54.480 Average Speed=42.970 km/h

Rank	Name	Country	Sprint Number										Finish Order	Lap Points			Total Points
Rank	Name	Country	1	2	3	4	5	6	7	8	9	10	Finish Order	+	-	Balance	Total Points
	Vera Carrara	Italy					5					3	2	20		20	31
	Olga Slyusareva	Russia		5	5	2		5	3	2	2	5	1				29
	Katherine Bates	Spain	5	2		3	2	2	5	1	1		15				21
4	Meifang Li	China				5				5			6				10
5	Adrie Visser	Netherlands	3		3	1		3					9				10
6	Joanne Kiesanowski	New Zealand	1	1			1	1		3			7				7
7	Mandy Poitras	Canada									5		8				5
8	Emma Davies	Great Britain			2							2	3				4
9	Charlotte Becker	Germany			1				2			1	4				4
10	Belem Guerrero	Mexico					3		1				12				4
11	Lyudmyla Vypyraylo	Ukraine		3									11				3
12	Tatsiana Sharakova	Belarus	2										14				2
13	Erin Mirabella	United States											5				0
14	Katarzyna Jagusiak	Poland											10				0
15	Wan Yiu Wong	Hong Kong											13		20	-20	-20
