= Spain at the UCI Track Cycling World Championships =

Spain at the UCI Track Cycling World Championships was represented by teams of 15 cyclists, comprising five women and ten men, at both the 2015 and 2016 UCI Track Cycling World Championships. In 2015, Albert Torres won the silver medal in the men's scratch and Eloy Teruel won silver in the men's points race. In 2016, Sebastián Mora won the men's scratch and, together with Torres, placed third in the men's madison.

== 2015 ==
Spain at the 2015 UCI Track Cycling World Championships
- IOC code: ESP

in Saint-Quentin-en-Yvelines, France 18 February – 22 February 2015
- Competitors: 15
- Medals Ranked 11th: Gold 0 Silver 2 Bronze 0 Total 2

UCI Track Cycling World Championships appearances (overview)
- Overview page Recent: 2009; 2010; 2011; 2012; 2013; 2014; 2015; 2016; 2017; 2018; 2019; 2020; 2021; 2022; 2023; 2024; 2025; 2026

Spain competed at the 2015 UCI Track Cycling World Championships in Saint-Quentin-en-Yvelines at the Vélodrome de Saint-Quentin-en-Yvelines from 18 to 22 February 2015. A team of 15 cyclists (5 women, 10 men) was announced to represent the country in the event.

== Results ==
=== Men ===
Name	Event	Result	Rank
Juan Peralta	Men's sprint	9.845 (Q),	17
José Moreno	Men's sprint	10.218	33
José Moreno	Men's 1 km time trial	—N/a	DNS
Sebastián Mora	Men's individual pursuit	4:27.898	14
Albert Torres	Men's scratch	—N/a	2nd place, silver medalist(s)
Eloy Teruel	Men's points race	30 points	2nd place, silver medalist(s)
Unai Elorriaga	Men's omnium	52 points	20
David Muntaner; Albert Torres	Men's madison	15 points	4
Unai Elorriaga; Eloy Teruel; Albert Torres; Illart Zuazubiskar	Men's team pursuit	4:02.488	10
Sergio Aliaga; José Moreno; Juan Peralta	Men's team sprint	44.835	14

=== Women ===
Name	Event	Result	Rank
Tania Calvo	Women's sprint	11.004 (Q),	11
Helena Casas	Women's sprint	11.249 (Q),	22
Tania Calvo	Women's 500 m time trial	34.280	10
Gloria Rodríguez	Women's individual pursuit	3:45.409	18
Leire Olaberria	Women's points race	4 points	12
Leire Olaberria	Women's omnium	129 points	7
Sheyla Gutiérrez	Women's scratch	—N/a	DNF
Tania Calvo; Helena Casas	Women's team sprint	33.556	7
Tania Calvo	Women's keirin		13

Spain at the UCI Track Cycling World Championships
- IOC code: ESP
- Medals: Gold 0 Silver 0 Bronze 0 Total 0

This page details Spain's participation at the UCI Track Cycling World Championships, the highest level of competition with professional track cycling. Winners of the World Championships are entitled to wear the rainbow jersey within their respective discipline for the following period of one year. Past World Champions are typically signified by with rainbow edging or piping on their jersey and shorts.

== 2016 ==
The 2016 UCI Track Cycling World Championships were held at the Lee Valley VeloPark in London, United Kingdom from 2–4 March 2016. A team of 15 cyclists (5 women, 10 men) was announced to represent Spain in the event.

=== Results ===
==== Men ====
Name	Event	Result	Rank
Juan Peralta Gascon	Men's sprint		27
José Moreno Sánchez	Men's 1 km time trial	01:02.550	11
Vicente Garcia De Mateos Rubio	Men's individual pursuit	269.483	16
Sebastián Mora Vedri	Men's scratch	—N/a	1
Eloy Teruel Rovira	Men's points race	1 points	12
José Moreno Sánchez; Juan Peralta; Sergio Aliaga	Men's team sprint	45.013	13
Julio Amores; Xavier Cañellas; Vicente García de Mateos; Illart Zuazubiskar	Men's team pursuit		13
Sebastián Mora; Albert Torres	Men's madison	12 points	3

==== Women ====
Name	Event	Result	Rank
Tania Calvo Barbero	Women's sprint		20
Helena Casas Roige	Women's sprint		28
Tania Calvo Barbero	Women's 500 m time trial	34.264 sec	8
Gloria Rodríguez Sánchez	Women's individual pursuit	03:41.992	10
Tania Calvo Barbero	Women's keirin		21
Leire Olaberria Dorronsoro	Women's scratch	—N/a	16
Irene Usabiaga Balerdi	Women's points race	0 points	17
Leire Olaberria Dorronsoro	Women's omnium	100 points	11
Tania Calvo; Helena Casas	Women's team sprint	33.455	8
