= Hugo Osteti =

BMX rider

Personal information
- Full name: Hugo Vasconcellos Osteti
- Born: 25 October 1993 (age 32)

Cycling career
- Sport: Cycling
- Disciplines: BMX; Track cycling
- Role: Rider
- Rider type: team sprint
Medal record
Representing Brazil
Men's track cycling
Pan American Games
Bronze medal – third place	2015 Toronto	Team sprint
Pan American Championships
Bronze medal – third place	2015 Santiago	Team sprint

Hugo Vasconcelos Osteti (Note: This name uses Portuguese naming customs: the first or maternal family name is Vasconcelos and the second or paternal family name is Osteti.) (born 25 October 1993) is a Brazilian male BMX rider and track cyclist. He competed in the team sprint event at the 2015 UCI Track Cycling World Championships.

Hugo has done BMX Racing for 16 years and Track Cycling for 3 years.

- Gold Pan American
- Gold Latin American 3x
- Champion National 5x
- Champion State 4x
- Champion Brazil Cup 6x
- Champion Regional Bronze
- Pan American Games
- Bronze Pan American
