= Germany at the UCI Track Cycling World Championships =

== 2015 ==
Germany at the 2015 UCI Track Cycling World Championships
- IOC code: GER

in Saint-Quentin-en-Yvelines, France 18 February – 22 February 2015
- Competitors: 21
- Medals Ranked 3rd: Gold 3 Silver 1 Bronze 3 Total 7

UCI Track Cycling World Championships appearances (overview)
- Overview page Recent: 2008; 2009; 2010; 2011; 2012; 2013; 2014; 2015; 2016; 2017; 2018; 2019; 2020; 2021; 2022; 2023; 2024; 2025

Germany competed at the 2015 UCI Track Cycling World Championships in Saint-Quentin-en-Yvelines at the Vélodrome de Saint-Quentin-en-Yvelines from 18–22 February 2015. A team of 21 cyclists (8 women, 13 men) was announced to represent the country in the event.

== Results ==
=== Men ===
Name	Event	Result	Rank
Stefan Bötticher	Men's sprint	9.641 (Q),	9
Robert Förstemann	Men's sprint	9.877 (Q),	20
Joachim Eilers	Men's 1 km time trial	1:00.294	2nd place, silver medalist(s)
Eric Engler	Men's 1 km time trial	1:01.653	11
Kersten Thiele	Men's individual pursuit	4:21.724	6
Lucas Liss	Men's scratch	—	1st place, gold medalist(s)
Maximilian Beyer	Men's points race	29 points	3rd place, bronze medalist(s)
Lucas Liss	Men's omnium	134 points	11
Maximilian Levy	Men's keirin		4
Stefan Bötticher	Men's keirin		8
Joachim Eilers	Men's keirin		17
Henning Bommel; Theo Reinhardt	Men's madison	12 points	5
Theo Reinhardt; Henning Bommel; Kersten Thiele; Domenic Weinstein	Men's team pursuit	3:58.823 (Q),	4
Joachim Eilers; René Enders; Robert Förstemann	Men's team sprint	43.136 (q), 43339	3rd place, bronze medalist(s)

=== Women ===
Name	Event	Result	Rank
Kristina Vogel	Women's sprint	10.770 (Q),	1st place, gold medalist(s)
Miriam Welte	Women's sprint	11.034 (Q),	12
Miriam Welte	Women's 500 m time trial	33.699	
Mieke Kröger	Women's individual pursuit	3:38.522	10
Stephanie Pohl	Women's points race	38 points	
Anna Knauer	Women's omnium	112 points	11
Gudrun Stock	Women's scratch	—	10
Charlotte Becker; Stephanie Pohl; Mieke Kröger; Gudrun Stock	Women's team pursuit	4:31.078 (q),	7
Kristina Vogel; Miriam Welte	Women's team sprint	32.712 (q),	4
Miriam Welte	Women's keirin		13
Kristina Vogel	Women's keirin		17

== 2016 ==
Germany at the 2016 UCI Track Cycling World Championships
- IOC code: GER

in London, United Kingdom 2 March – 6 March 2016
- Competitors: 21 (12 men, 9 women)
- Medals: Gold 2 Silver 0 Bronze 2 Total 4

UCI Track Cycling World Championships appearances (overview)
- Recent: 2008; 2009; 2010; 2011; 2012; 2013; 2014; 2015; 2016; 2017; 2018; 2019; 2020; 2021; 2022; 2023; 2024; 2025

Germany competed at the 2016 UCI Track Cycling World Championships at the Lee Valley VeloPark in London, United Kingdom from 2–4 March 2016. A team of 21 cyclists (9 women, 12 men) was announced to represent the country in the event.

== Results ==
=== Men ===
Name	Event	Result	Rank
Max Niederlag	Men's sprint		10
Maximilian Levy	Men's sprint		21
Joachim Eilers	Men's 1 km time trial	01:00.042	1
Maximilian Dornbach	Men's 1 km time trial	01:02.425	10
Domenic Weinstein	Men's individual pursuit	256.206 (q), 258.275 (f)	2
Joachim Eilers	Men's keirin	—	1
Maximilian Levy	Men's keirin	—	4
Lucas Liss	Men's scratch	—	7
Leif Lampater	Men's points race	0 points	DNS
René Enders; Max Niederlag; Joachim Eilers	Men's team sprint	43.496 (q), 43.536	3
Leif Lampater; Nils Schomber; Kersten Thiele; Domenic Weinstein	Men's team pursuit		6
Kersten Thiele; Domenic Weinstein	Men's madison	1 points (-1 laps down)	9

=== Women ===
Name	Event	Result	Rank
Kristina Vogel	Women's sprint		3
Miriam Welte	Women's sprint		17
Emma Hinze	Women's sprint		19
Miriam Welte	Women's 500 m time trial	34.192 sec	7
Mieke Kroger	Women's individual pursuit	03:38.002	5
Kristina Vogel	Women's keirin		1
Charlotte Becker	Women's scratch	—	9
Stephanie Pohl	Women's points race	7 points	6
Stephanie Pohl; Charlotte Becker; Mieke Kröger; Gudrun Stock	Women's team pursuit	04:32.398	10
Miriam Welte; Kristina Vogel	Women's team sprint	32.808 (q), 32.74 (f)	3
Anna Knauer	Women's omnium	95 points	13
