= 2005 UCI Track Cycling World Championships – Women's scratch =

Women's scratch
2005 UCI Track Cycling World Championships

Race details
- Dates: March 27, 2005
- Stages: 1
- Distance: 10 km (6.214 mi)

Medalists
	Gold	Olga Slyusareva (RUS)
	Silver	Katherine Bates (AUS)
	Bronze	Lyudmyla Vypyraylo (UKR)

Rainbow jersey

The Women's Scratch is one of the 6 women's events at the 2005 UCI Track Cycling World Championships, held in Los Angeles, United States.

16 Cyclists from 16 countries participated in the contest. Because of the number of entries, there were no qualification rounds for this discipline. Consequently, the event was run direct to the final.

== Final ==
The Final and only race was run at 14:30 on March 27. The competition consisted on 40 laps, making a total of 10 km.

Rank	Name	Country
	Olga Slyusareva	Russia
	Katherine Bates	Australia
	Lyudmyla Vypyraylo	Ukraine
4	Adrie Visser	Netherlands
5	Eleonora Soldo	Italy
6	Catherine Sell	New Zealand
7	Nikki Harris	United Kingdom
8	Katarzyna Jagusiak	Poland
9	Charlotte Becker	Germany
10	Pascale Schnider	Switzerland
11	Meifang Li	China
12	Tatsiana Sharakova	Belarus
DNF	Mandy Poitras	Canada
DNF	Virginie Moinard	France
DNF	Rebecca Quinn	United States
DNF	Norazian Alias	Malaysia
