= Anderson Parra =

Colombian cyclist

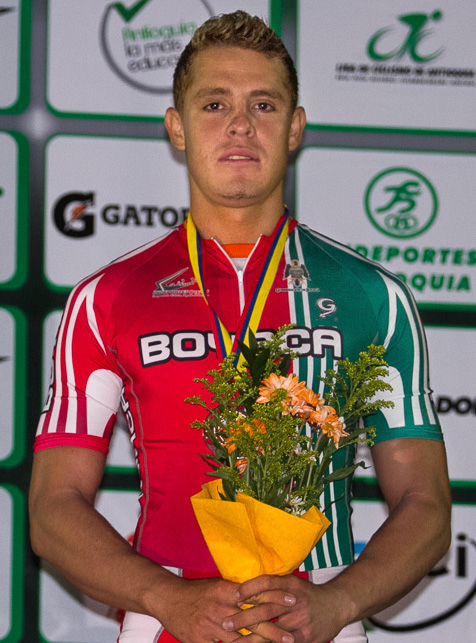

Personal information
- Born: 18 October 1989 (age 36)

Cycling career
- Sport: Cycling
- Role: Rider

Anderson Parra (born 18 October 1989) is a Colombian professional racing cyclist.

Hailing from Sincelejo, he tried football and skating as a child before taking up cycling. After qualifying for the Colombian national squad, he moved to Boyacá.

He won medals at both the Bolivarian Games, the Central American and Caribbean Games and Pan American Track Cycling Championships. He subsequently rode at the 2015 UCI Track Cycling World Championships.
