= Son Je-yong =

South Korean cyclist

Personal information
- Born: 12 January 1994 (age 32) Daegu, South Korea
- Education: Korea National Sport University

Korean name
- Hangul: 손제용
- RR: Son Jeyong
- MR: Son Cheyong

Sport
- Sport: Cycling
- Cycling career
- Full name: Son Je-yong
- Sport: Cycling
- Current team: Geumsan Insam Cello
- Disciplines: Track; Road
- Role: Rider

Professional team
- 2018–: Geumsan Insam Cello

Son Je-yong (Korean: 손제용; Korean pronunciation: [son.dʑe̞.joŋ] or [son] [tɕe̞.joŋ]; born 12 January 1994) is a South Korean professional racing cyclist, who currently rides for UCI Continental team Geumsan Insam Cello. He competed in the 2014 Asian Games and won a gold medal in team sprint.
