= 2015 UCI Track Cycling World Championships =

World Championships for track cycling in 2015

- Venue: Saint-Quentin-en-Yvelines, France
- Date: 18–22 February
- Velodrome: Vélodrome de Saint-Quentin-en-Yvelines
- Nations participating: 38
- Cyclists participating: 385
- Events: 19

The 2015 UCI Track Cycling World Championships were the World Championships for track cycling in 2015. They took place in Saint-Quentin-en-Yvelines (part of the Paris Metropolitan Area) at the Vélodrome de Saint-Quentin-en-Yvelines from 18–22 February 2015.

== Schedule ==
This was the schedule of events:

Competition	F	Final

Men
Date →	Wed 18			Thu 19			Fri 20			Sat 21			Sun 22		
Event ↓	A	E		A	E		A		E	A		E	M	A	
Men's 1 km time trial									F						
Men's individual pursuit										Q		F			
Men's keirin				1st	2nd	F									
Men's omnium							SR	IP	ER	TT	FL	PR			
Men's points race									F						
Men's scratch					F										
Men's sprint										Q ^{1}/_{16} ^{1}/_{8}			¼	½	F
Men's team pursuit	Q			1st	F										
Men's team sprint		Q	F												
Men's madison														F	

Women
Date →	Wed 18			Thu 19		Fri 20		Sat 21				Sun 22			
Event ↓	A	E		A	E	A	E	A		E		M		A	
Women's 500 m time trial					F										
Women's individual pursuit						Q	F								
Women's keirin												1st		2nd	F
Women's omnium								SR	IP	ER		TT	FL	PR	
Women's points race		F													
Women's scratch										F					
Women's sprint						Q ^{1}/_{16} ^{1}/_{8}	¼			½	F				
Women's team pursuit	Q			1st	F										
Women's team sprint		Q	F												

A = Afternoon session, E = Evening session
Q = qualifiers, 1st = first round, 2nd = second round, ^{1}/_{16} = sixteenth finals, ^{1}/_{8} = eighth finals, ¼ = quarterfinals, ½ = semifinals
SR = Scratch Race, IP = Individual Pursuit, ER = Elimination Race, TT = Time Trial, FL = Flying Lap, PR = Points Race

== Participating nations ==
385 cyclists from 38 countries were registered for the championships. The number of cyclists per nation is shown in parentheses.

Participating nations
Click on a nation to go to the nations' 2015 Championships page
- Argentina (6)
- Australia (20)
- Austria (2)
- Belarus (12)
- Belgium (10)
- Brazil (4)
- Canada (13)
- China (21)
- Colombia (14)
- Cuba (6)
- Czech Republic (9)
- Denmark (6)
- Finland (1)
- France (21)
- Germany (21)
- Great Britain (20)
- Greece (2)
- Hong Kong (11)
- Ireland (9)
- Italy (20)
- Japan (13)
- Lithuania (4)
- Malaysia (3)
- Mexico (4)
- Netherlands (13)
- New Zealand (18)
- Poland (14)
- Portugal (3)
- Russia (27)
- Slovakia (1)
- South Africa (3)
- South Korea (4)
- Spain (15)
- Switzerland (7)
- Ukraine (8)
- United States (14)
- Uzbekistan (1)
- Venezuela (5)

== Medal summary ==
=== Medal table ===
Rank	Nation	Gold	Silver	Bronze	Total
1	France	5	0	2	7
2	Australia	4	4	3	11
3	Germany	3	1	3	7
4	Russia	2	2	0	4
5	Netherlands	1	2	1	4
5	New Zealand	1	2	1	4
7	China	1	0	1	2
8	Colombia	1	0	0	1
8	Switzerland	1	0	0	1
10	Great Britain	0	3	0	3
11	Spain	0	2	0	2
12	United States	0	1	2	3
13	Italy	0	1	1	2
14	Japan	0	1	0	1
15	Canada	0	0	2	2
16	Belgium	0	0	1	1
16	Cuba	0	0	1	1
16	Malaysia	0	0	1	1
Totals (18 entries)		19	19	19	57

=== Medalists ===
Event	Gold	Silver	Bronze
Men's events
Men's sprint	Grégory Baugé; France	Denis Dmitriev; Russia	Quentin Lafargue; France
Men's 1 km time trial	François Pervis; France	Joachim Eilers; Germany	Matt Archibald; New Zealand
Men's individual pursuit	Stefan Küng; Switzerland	Jack Bobridge; Australia	Julien Morice; France
Men's team pursuit	New Zealand; Pieter Bulling; Dylan Kennett; Alex Frame; Marc Ryan	Great Britain; Ed Clancy; Steven Burke; Owain Doull; Andrew Tennant	Australia; Jack Bobridge; Alexander Edmondson; Mitchell Mulhern; Miles Scotson
Men's team sprint	France; Grégory Baugé; Michaël D'Almeida; Kévin Sireau	New Zealand; Eddie Dawkins; Ethan Mitchell; Sam Webster	Germany; Joachim Eilers; René Enders; Robert Förstemann
Men's keirin	François Pervis; France	Eddie Dawkins; New Zealand	Azizulhasni Awang; Malaysia
Men's scratch	Lucas Liss; Germany	Albert Torres; Spain	Bobby Lea; United States
Men's points race	Artur Ershov; Russia	Eloy Teruel; Spain	Maximilian Beyer; Germany
Men's madison	France; Bryan Coquard; Morgan Kneisky	Italy; Liam Bertazzo; Elia Viviani	Belgium; Jasper De Buyst; Otto Vergaerde
Men's omnium	Fernando Gaviria; Colombia	Glenn O'Shea; Australia	Elia Viviani; Italy
Women's events
Women's sprint	Kristina Vogel; Germany	Elis Ligtlee; Netherlands	Zhong Tianshi; China
Women's 500 m time trial	Anastasia Voinova; Russia	Anna Meares; Australia	Miriam Welte; Germany
Women's individual pursuit	Rebecca Wiasak; Australia	Jennifer Valente; United States	Amy Cure; Australia
Women's team pursuit	Australia; Annette Edmondson; Ashlee Ankudinoff; Amy Cure; Melissa Hoskins	Great Britain; Katie Archibald; Laura Trott; Elinor Barker; Joanna Rowsell	Canada; Allison Beveridge; Jasmin Glaesser; Kirsti Lay; Stephanie Roorda
Women's team sprint	China; Gong Jinjie; Zhong Tianshi	Russia; Daria Shmeleva; Anastasia Voinova	Australia; Kaarle McCulloch; Anna Meares
Women's keirin	Anna Meares; Australia	Shanne Braspennincx; Netherlands	Lisandra Guerra; Cuba
Women's scratch	Kirsten Wild; Netherlands	Amy Cure; Australia	Allison Beveridge; Canada
Women's points race	Stephanie Pohl; Germany	Minami Uwano; Japan	Kimberly Geist; United States
Women's omnium	Annette Edmondson; Australia	Laura Trott; Great Britain	Kirsten Wild; Netherlands

- Shaded events are non-Olympic

== Broadcasting ==
36 TV stations broadcast the event.

== See also ==
- Cycling at the 2015 Pan American Games
