= Lee Valley VeloPark =

Velodrome in Stratford, London, England

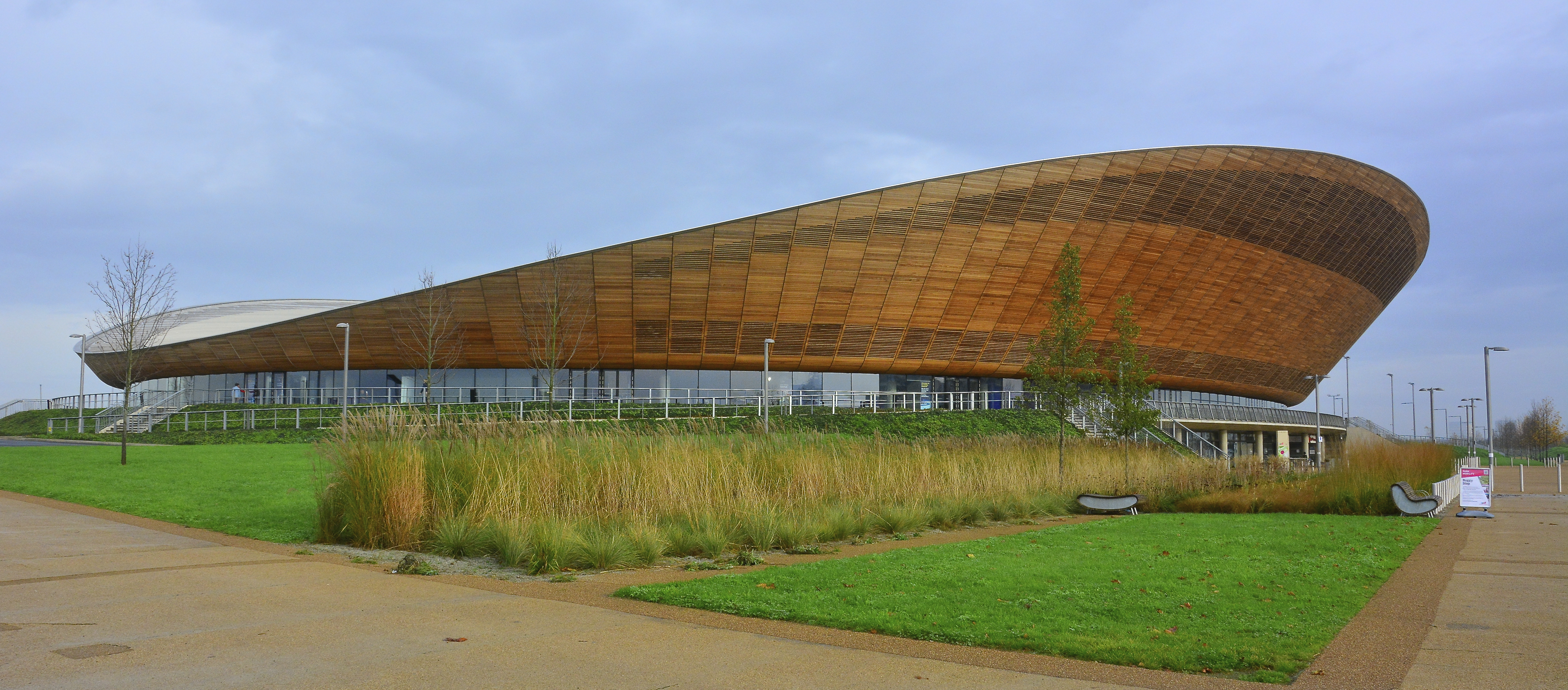
- The velodrome in November 2014
- Interactive map of Lee Valley VeloPark
- Full name: Lee Valley VeloPark
- Location: Queen Elizabeth Olympic Park; London, E20; England, United Kingdom
- Coordinates: 51.5504°N 0.0153°W
- Operator: Lee Valley Regional Park Authority
- Capacity: 6,750 (velodrome)
- Surface: Siberian pine (velodrome)
- Field size: 250 m (820.21 ft)
- Public transit: Stratford; Stratford International

Construction
- Groundbreaking: 2009
- Built: 2009–2011
- Opened: 22 February 2011
- Cost: £105 million (velodrome)
- Architects: Hopkins Architects (Mike Taylor), Grant Associates
- Structural engineer: Expedition Engineering
- Services engineer: BDSP
- Main contractor: ISG

Lee Valley VeloPark is a cycling centre in Queen Elizabeth Olympic Park in Stratford, London, England. It is owned and managed by Lee Valley Regional Park Authority, and it was opened to the public in March 2014. The facility was one of the permanent venues for the 2012 Olympic and Paralympic Games.

Lee Valley VeloPark is at the northern end of Queen Elizabeth Olympic Park. It has an indoor velodrome and a BMX racing track, which have been used for the Games, as well as a one-mile (1.6 km) road course and 5 miles (8 km) of mountain bike trails. The park replaces the Eastway Cycle Circuit demolished to make way for it. The facilities built for the Olympics were constructed between 2009 and 2011. The first event in the Velopark was the London round of the 2011 UCI BMX Supercross World Cup series.

== Planning ==
In February 2005, plans were announced for a £22 million VeloPark. Sport England would invest £10.5 million, Lee Valley Regional Park Authority £6 million and the Mayor of London and Transport for London would invest £3 million and £2.5 million respectively. The site was to be 34 hectares on the northern end of the proposed Olympic Park, next to the A12. The park would include a velodrome seating 1,500, which could be increased to 6,000 if London's bid for the 2012 Olympic and Paralympic Games were successful. The site would also have an international competition BMX circuit, a BMX freestyle park, cyclo-cross/cross-country course mountain bike course and an outdoor cycle speedway track. The facilities would be used by internationals as well as those learning to ride. It was estimated that the park would attract 88,000 users a year, replacing the Eastway Cycle Circuit. Eastway Cycle Circuit opened in 1975, it was the first purpose built road cycling venue in Britain.

The facility closed in September 2006 to make way for London's VeloPark. The velodrome is the third 250 m (270 yd) covered track in Great Britain. In September 2008 plans for the VeloPark were revealed, which were chosen with help from Chris Hoy. However, by March 2007, the VeloPark was revealed to be only a third of its original size, rescaled from 34 to 10 hectares. The decrease in the size of the site led to users of the Eastway cycle circuit to protest to the Mayor of London.

== Builders ==
On 12 July 2007, the Olympic Delivery Authority selected the design team: Hopkins Architects, Expedition Engineering, BDSP, and Grant Associates, following an architectural design competition managed by RIBA Competitions.

The Velopark was scheduled to be completed by the contractor, ISG, in 2011. In 2004, during London's Olympic and Paralympic bid, the estimated cost was £37 million, including £20 million for the velodrome.

== Velodrome ==
In 2009, at the time work began on the construction of the velodrome, the estimated cost of that facility alone was £105 million. Work on the velodrome was completed in February 2011, and was the first Olympic Park venue to be completed. The roof is designed to reflect the geometry of cycling as well as being lightweight and efficient reflecting a bike. There is also a 360-degree concourse level with windows allowing people views of the Olympic Park. The velodrome is energy efficient—rooflights reduce the need for artificial lights, and natural ventilation reduces the need for air condition. Rain water is also collected, which reduces the amount of water used from the municipal water system. Designer Ron Webb, who designed the velodrome tracks for the Sydney and Athens Games, was in charge of the design and installation of the track. The 250-metre track was made with 56 km (35 miles) of Siberian Pine and 350,000 nails.

The velodrome was officially opened by many successful British athletes including Chris Hoy and Victoria Pendleton. It is informally known as "The Pringle" due to its distinctive shape. It was shortlisted for the 2011 RIBA Stirling Prize. and won the 2011 Structural Awards Supreme Award for Structural Engineering. In 2011, it also won the Prime Minister's Better Public Building Award at British Construction Industry Awards.

The venue was used for the first time in competition during the UCI Track Cycling World Cup in February 2012. The velodrome was also used for the 2012 Paralympics.

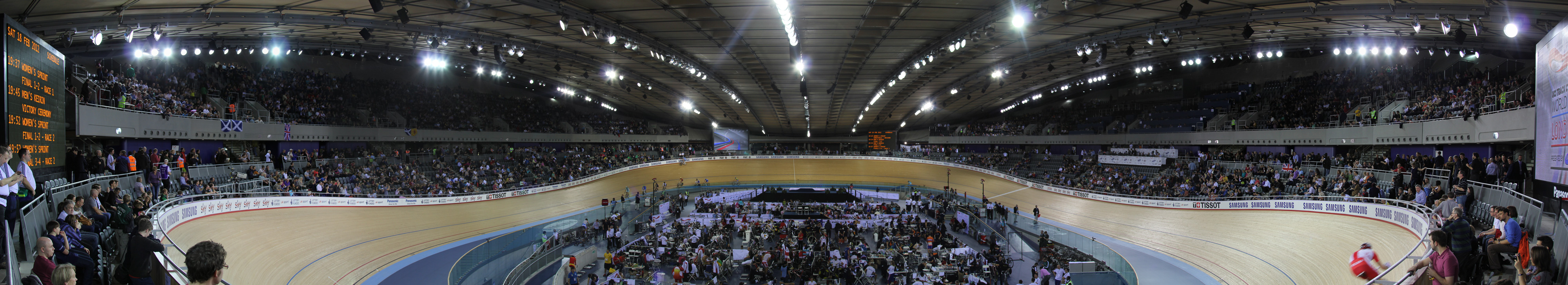
The London Velopark at the World Cup Cycling Event in February 2012

== BMX track ==
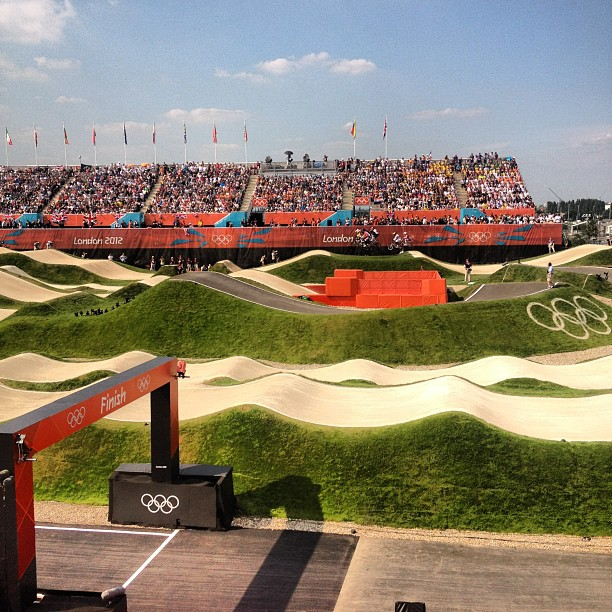
The BMX Track during the 2012 Summer Olympics

The outdoor BMX racing track was scheduled to have a spectator capacity of 6,000. Work began on its construction in March 2011. After the games the seating was removed and the track reconfigured to accommodate all abilities. The first competition on the venue was the test event for the Olympic Games, a round of the 2011 UCI Supercross BMX World Cup series. The track for men is 470 metres long and features a berm jump, an S-bend transfer, a box jump and a rhythm section in the final straight. The women's course is 430 metres long featuring three jumps in the opening straight and a tunnel before like the men's including a rhythm section in the final straight. It has been called one of the most challenging BMX tracks to date. The track also features an 8-metre high starting ramp and was designed by the UCI with the aim of pushing the boundaries of the sport. 14,000 cubic metres (494,405 cu ft) of soil was used to build the track. After the Supercross world cup event, Shanaze Reade called for changes to the track. She stated that the track was "on the limit" if the wind changed. Sarah Walker echoed Reade's calls stating that the track could "get ugly" on a windy day.

In preparation for the 2012 Summer Olympics, in 2010 the Dutch National Olympic Committee commissioned a replica of the planned BMX track at their National Sports Centre Papendal. It came into use in March 2011, ahead of the hand over of the London Velopark BMX venue.

== London 2012 ==
The venue was used for the 2012 Olympic and Paralympic track cycling competition was held in the Velodrome with the adjoining BMX track hosting the Olympic BMX competition. Team GB dominated the track cycling competition winning seven out of a possible ten gold medals plus one silver and one bronze. The GB Paralympic track cycling team won a total of 15 medals, comprising five golds, seven silver and three bronze.

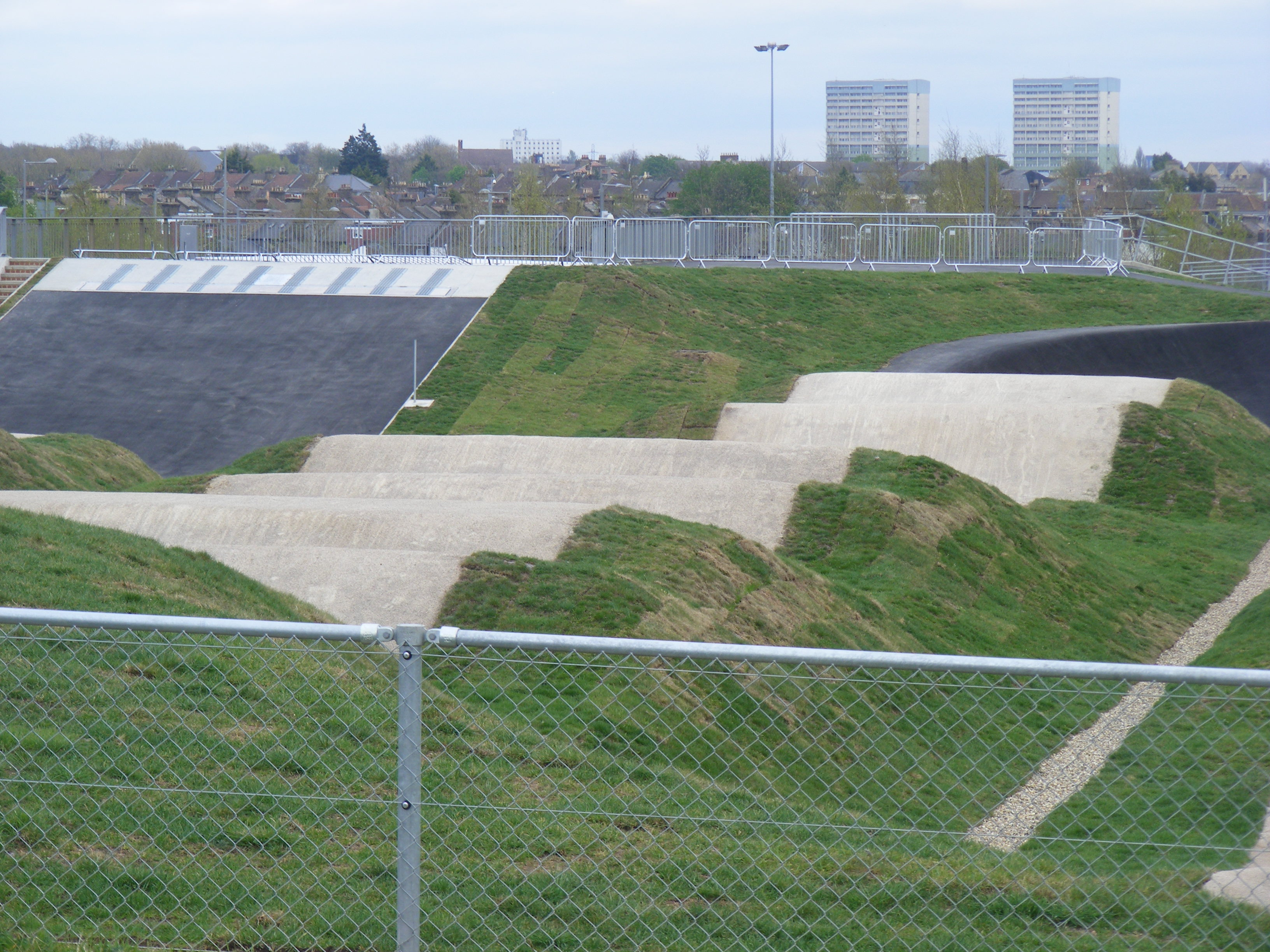
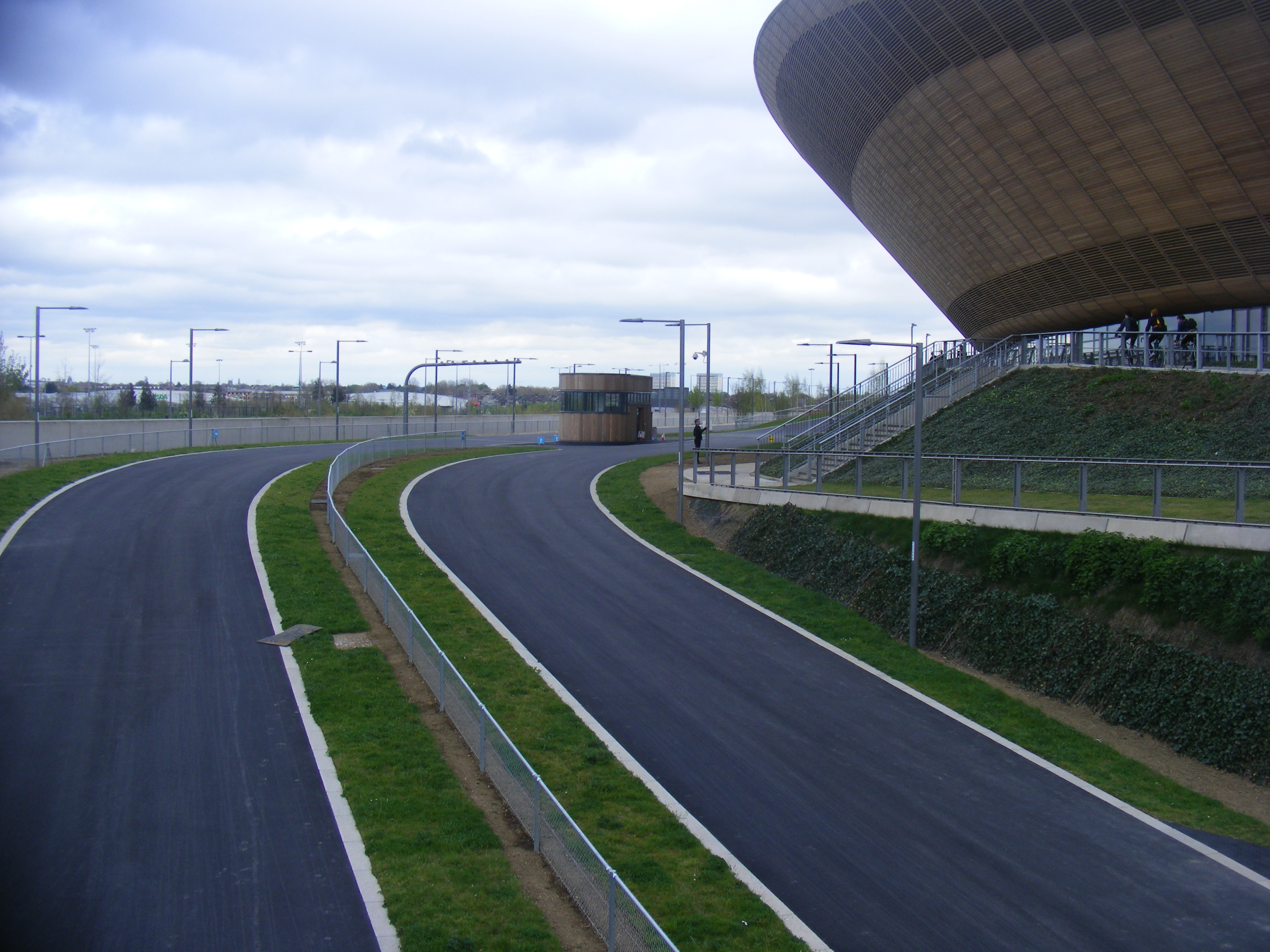
The BMX course post 2012 and the road race circuit.

The Eastway Cycle Circuit was demolished for the VeloPark before being merged with the new park. It was announced that along with the VeloPark there would be three new cycle circuits created around London. In early February 2007 the plans for the VeloPark were revised with no mountain bike course. By mid-February it was announced that Hog Hill would be the temporary relocation of the Eastway Cycle Centre. The promised cycle speedway track will not be built. In August 2011 it was announced that the road race course will be rerouted to allow more space and parkland after suggestions from Sport England and British Cycling. The course will now cross the River Lee and parkland linking up with other cycle routes in London.

British Cycling will remain based at the Olympic-standard Manchester Velodrome which has been a catalyst for the success of British Cycling in recent years, most notably at the 2008 Olympic Games. Team manager of British Cycling, David Brailsford has stated that the new indoor National BMX Arena in Manchester and the undulating terrain of North West England, ideal for practising road race cycling, offer a distinct advantage over London. An agreement was struck in 2012 to bring track cycling to the London Velodrome post-2012 Olympics, with events such as Revolution series which have proved popular in Manchester. In September 2013 the UCI announced that the Velodrome will host the 2016 UCI Track Cycling World Championships.

The London Development Agency (LDA) have funded a new permanent road cycle circuit and mountain bike course at the Redbridge Cycling Centre, costing £5m. The London Borough of Redbridge will be funding the facility up to the completion of the legacy London Velopark. Work is underway to identify an operator of Hog Hill beyond 2012.

== Later events ==
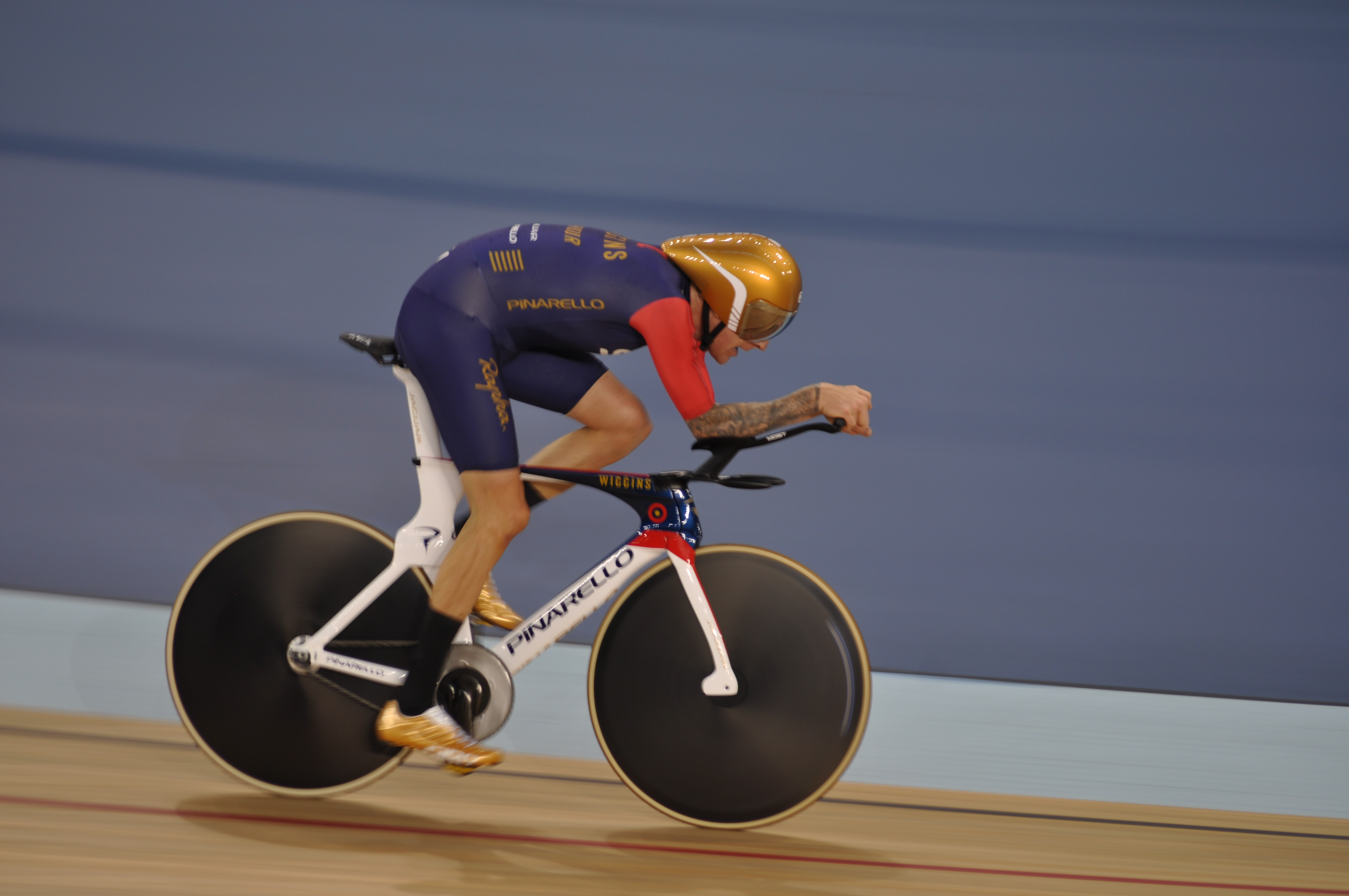
Bradley Wiggins during his successful Hour record attempt at the Velodrome

Since opening for the public in March 2014, Lee Valley VeloPark has staged a number of major international events. The first that took place in the venue was the grand finale of the Revolution series in February 2014. This was followed by the opening round of the 2014–15 Revolution Series in October 2014 and in December 2014, the UCI Track Cycling World Cup took place at Lee Valley VeloPark. In February 2015, round five of the Revolution Series was staged at the venue while in February 2016, it hosted the 2016 UCI Track Cycling World Championships.

On 7 June 2015, Sir Bradley Wiggins broke the UCI Hour record at the Velodrome, setting a distance of 54.526 km (33.881 miles).

The facility hosted the 2022 Commonwealth Games track cycling competition.

The Grand Finale and round four of the 2024 UCI Track Champions League was hosted at Lee Valley Velopark.

== Velodrome awards ==
- Winner 2011 the Architects' Journal 100 Building of the Year Awards
- Winner 2011 Prime Minister's Better Public Building Award
- Winner 2011 RIBA (Royal Institute of British Architects) Stirling Prize for Architecture Public Vote
- Finalist 2011 RIBA Stirling Prize for Architecture
- Winner 2011 IStructE (The Institution of Structural Engineers) Structural Awards Supreme Award for Structural Engineering
- Winner 2012 Architecture Award Design Museum's Design Awards
- Winner 2012 Elle Decoration British Design Awards
- Winner 2013 International Association for Bridge and Structural Engineering Outstanding Structure Award

== See also ==
- Arizona Veterans Memorial Coliseum
- Scotiabank Saddledome
- Hyperboloid structure
- Tensile architecture
- Thin-shell structure

Preceded by Vélodrome de Saint-Quentin-en-Yvelines; Montigny-le-Bretonneux, Paris	UCI Track Cycling World Championships; Venue; 2016	Succeeded by Hong Kong Velodrome; Hong Kong
