= 2016 UCI Track Cycling World Championships – Women's points race =

Women's points race at the 2016 UCI Track Cycling World Championships
- Venue: Lee Valley VeloPark, London
- Date: 5 March
- Competitors: 20 from 20 nations
- Winning points: 15

Medalists
gold medal	Katarzyna Pawłowska	Poland
silver medal	Jasmin Glaesser	Canada
bronze medal	Arlenis Sierra	Cuba

The Women's points race event of the 2016 UCI Track Cycling World Championships was held on 5 March 2016. Katarzyna Pawłowska of Poland won the gold medal.

== Results ==
100 laps (25 km) were raced with 10 sprints.

Rank	Name	Nation	Sprint points	Lap points	Total points
1st place, gold medalist(s)	Katarzyna Pawłowska	Poland	15	0	15
2nd place, silver medalist(s)	Jasmin Glaesser	Canada	14	0	14
3rd place, bronze medalist(s)	Arlenis Sierra	Cuba	14	0	14
4	Georgia Baker	Australia	13	0	13
5	Emily Nelson	Great Britain	8	0	8
6	Stephanie Pohl	Germany	7	0	7
7	Kimberly Geist	United States	6	0	6
8	Gulnaz Badykova	Russia	5	0	5
9	Jarmila Machačová	Czech Republic	5	0	5
10	Ina Savenka	Belarus	5	0	5
11	Elena Cecchini	Italy	4	0	4
12	Lotte Kopecky	Belgium	2	0	2
13	Minami Uwano	Japan	2	0	2
14	Hanna Solovey	Ukraine	1	0	1
15	Élise Delzenne	France	1	0	1
16	Alžbeta Pavlendová	Slovakia	0	0	0
17	Irene Usabiaga	Spain	0	0	0
18	Pang Yao	Hong Kong	0	0	0
19	Caroline Ryan	Ireland	0	0	0
20	Aušrinė Trebaitė	Lithuania	8	−20	−12
