= 2016 UCI Track Cycling World Championships – Women's scratch =

Women's scratch at the 2016 UCI Track Cycling World Championships
- Venue: Lee Valley VeloPark, London
- Date: 3 March
- Competitors: 20 from 20 nations

Medalists
gold medal	Laura Trott	Great Britain
silver medal	Kirsten Wild	Netherlands
bronze medal	Stephanie Roorda	Canada

The Women's scratch event of the 2016 UCI Track Cycling World Championships was held on 3 March 2016. Laura Trott of Great Britain won gold.

== Results ==
The race was started at 20:20.

Rank	Name	Nation	Laps down
1st place, gold medalist(s)	Laura Trott	Great Britain	
2nd place, silver medalist(s)	Kirsten Wild	Netherlands	
3rd place, bronze medalist(s)	Stephanie Roorda	Canada	
4	Jolien D'Hoore	Belgium	
5	Jarmila Machačová	Czech Republic	
6	Evgenia Romanyuta	Russia	
7	Arlenis Sierra	Cuba	
8	Yang Qianyu	Hong Kong	
9	Charlotte Becker	Germany	
10	Marina Shmayankova	Belarus	
11	Minami Uwano	Japan	
12	Lizbeth Salazar	Mexico	
13	Natalia Rutkowska	Poland	
14	Maria Giulia Confalonieri	Italy	
15	Pascale Jeuland	France	
16	Leire Olaberria	Spain	
17	Kimberly Geist	United States	
18	Alžbeta Pavlendová	Slovakia	
19	Tetyana Klimchenko	Ukraine	
20	Lydia Boylan	Ireland	−1
