= 2016 UCI Track Cycling World Championships – Women's omnium =

Women's omnium at the 2016 UCI Track Cycling World Championships
- Venue: Lee Valley VeloPark, London
- Date: 5–6 March
- Competitors: 20 from 20 nations
- Winning points: 201

Medalists
gold medal	Laura Trott	Great Britain
silver medal	Laurie Berthon	France
bronze medal	Sarah Hammer	United States

The Women's omnium event of the 2016 UCI Track Cycling World Championships was held on 5 and 6 March 2016. Laura Trott of Great Britain won the gold medal.

== Results ==
=== Scratch race ===
The scratch race was started at 10:48.

Rank	Name	Nation	Laps down
1	Amalie Dideriksen	Denmark	
2	Simona Frapporti	Italy	
3	Laura Trott	Great Britain	
4	Laurie Berthon	France	
5	Sarah Hammer	United States	
6	Jolien D'Hoore	Belgium	
7	Kirsten Wild	Netherlands	
8	Annette Edmondson	Australia	
9	Anna Knauer	Germany	
10	Diao Xiao Juan	Hong Kong	
11	Marlies Mejías	Cuba	
12	Luo Xiaoling	China	
13	Leire Olaberria	Spain	
14	Hsiao Mei-yu	Chinese Taipei	
15	Tamara Balabolina	Russia	
16	Allison Beveridge	Canada	
17	Angie González	Venezuela	
18	Tatsiana Sharakova	Belarus	
19	Sakura Tsukagoshi	Japan	
20	Lauren Ellis	New Zealand	

=== Individual pursuit ===
The Individual pursuit was started at .

Rank	Name	Nation	Time
1	Sarah Hammer	United States	3:28.630
2	Laura Trott	Great Britain	3:32.436
3	Tatsiana Sharakova	Belarus	3:34.714
4	Kirsten Wild	Netherlands	3:34.882
5	Jolien D'Hoore	Belgium	3:36.202
6	Amalie Dideriksen	Denmark	3:37.611
7	Laurie Berthon	France	3:38.028
8	Allison Beveridge	Canada	3:38.141
9	Lauren Ellis	New Zealand	3:38.327
10	Marlies Mejías	Cuba	3:38.547
11	Annette Edmondson	Australia	3:39.493
12	Tamara Balabolina	Russia	3:40.955
13	Leire Olaberria	Spain	3:41.875
14	Luo Xiaoling	China	3:41.876
15	Diao Xiao Juan	Hong Kong	3:42.962
16	Simona Frapporti	Italy	3:43.159
17	Angie González	Venezuela	3:44.841
18	Anna Knauer	Germany	3:45.780
19	Sakura Tsukagoshi	Japan	3:47.939
20	Hsiao Mei-yu	Chinese Taipei	3:56.996

=== Elimination race ===
The Elimination race was started at .

Rank	Name	Nation
1	Sarah Hammer	United States
2	Laura Trott	Great Britain
3	Amalie Dideriksen	Denmark
4	Laurie Berthon	France
5	Annette Edmondson	Australia
6	Kirsten Wild	Netherlands
7	Anna Knauer	Germany
8	Jolien D'Hoore	Belgium
9	Simona Frapporti	Italy
10	Allison Beveridge	Canada
11	Angie González	Venezuela
12	Leire Olaberria	Spain
13	Luo Xiaoling	China
14	Lauren Ellis	New Zealand
15	Hsiao Mei-yu	Chinese Taipei
16	Sakura Tsukagoshi	Japan
17	Tatsiana Sharakova	Belarus
18	Marlies Mejías	Cuba
19	Diao Xiao Juan	Hong Kong
20	Tamara Balabolina	Russia

=== 500 m time trial ===
The 500 m time trial was started at 10:16.

Rank	Name	Nation	Time
1	Annette Edmondson	Australia	35.095
2	Laurie Berthon	France	35.143
3	Laura Trott	Great Britain	35.273
4	Jolien D'Hoore	Belgium	35.424
5	Allison Beveridge	Canada	35.567
6	Hsiao Mei-yu	Chinese Taipei	35.672
7	Leire Olaberria	Spain	35.705
8	Sakura Tsukagoshi	Japan	35.940
9	Marlies Mejías	Cuba	36.050
10	Sarah Hammer	United States	36.330
11	Anna Knauer	Germany	36.418
12	Angie González	Venezuela	36.620
13	Lauren Ellis	New Zealand	36.747
14	Tamara Balabolina	Russia	36.776
15	Simona Frapporti	Italy	36.784
16	Tatsiana Sharakova	Belarus	36.848
17	Luo Xiaoling	China	36.872
18	Diao Xiao Juan	Hong Kong	37.072
19	Kirsten Wild	Netherlands	37.172
20	Amalie Dideriksen	Denmark	37.705

=== Flying lap ===
The Flying lap was started at 11:28.

Rank	Name	Nation	Time
1	Allison Beveridge	Canada	13.924
2	Laurie Berthon	France	14.012
3	Laura Trott	Great Britain	14.216
4	Annette Edmondson	Australia	14.232
5	Sarah Hammer	United States	14.275
6	Kirsten Wild	Netherlands	14.372
7	Jolien D'Hoore	Belgium	14.395
8	Marlies Mejías	Cuba	14.409
9	Hsiao Mei-yu	Chinese Taipei	14.551
10	Lauren Ellis	New Zealand	14.555
11	Leire Olaberria	Spain	14.558
12	Sakura Tsukagoshi	Japan	14.562
13	Anna Knauer	Germany	14.618
14	Simona Frapporti	Italy	14.714
15	Diao Xiao Juan	Hong Kong	14.742
16	Angie González	Venezuela	14.809
17	Luo Xiaoling	China	14.836
18	Tatsiana Sharakova	Belarus	14.851
19	Amalie Dideriksen	Denmark	15.103
20	Tamara Balabolina	Russia	15.104

=== Points race ===
The Points race was started at 14:42.

Rank	Name	Nation	Points
1	Lauren Ellis	New Zealand	65
2	Allison Beveridge	Canada	29
3	Kirsten Wild	Netherlands	27
4	Marlies Mejías	Cuba	26
5	Laura Trott	Great Britain	17
6	Sarah Hammer	United States	16
7	Laurie Berthon	France	11
8	Jolien D'Hoore	Belgium	7
9	Amalie Dideriksen	Denmark	7
10	Tatsiana Sharakova	Belarus	7
11	Annette Edmondson	Australia	6
12	Luo Xiaoling	China	6
13	Angie González	Venezuela	3
14	Leire Olaberria	Spain	2
15	Anna Knauer	Germany	1
16	Hsiao Mei-yu	Chinese Taipei	0
17	Simona Frapporti	Italy	0
18	Sakura Tsukagoshi	Japan	0
19	Tamara Balabolina	Russia	0
20	Diao Xiao Juan	Hong Kong	0

=== Final standings ===
After all events.

Rank	Name	Nation	Points
1st place, gold medalist(s)	Laura Trott	Great Britain	201
2nd place, silver medalist(s)	Laurie Berthon	France	183
3rd place, bronze medalist(s)	Sarah Hammer	United States	182
4	Allison Beveridge	Canada	159
5	Annette Edmondson	Australia	158
6	Jolien D'Hoore	Belgium	157
7	Kirsten Wild	Netherlands	153
8	Lauren Ellis	New Zealand	143
9	Marlies Mejías	Cuba	124
10	Amalie Dideriksen	Denmark	119
11	Leire Olaberria	Spain	100
12	Simona Frapporti	Italy	98
13	Anna Knauer	Germany	95
14	Hsiao Mei-yu	Chinese Taipei	82
15	Tatsiana Sharakova	Belarus	73
16	Luo Xiaoling	China	70
17	Angie González	Venezuela	67
18	Sakura Tsukagoshi	Japan	62
19	Diao Xiao Juan	Hong Kong	56
20	Tamara Balabolina	Russia	48
