= 2016 UCI Track Cycling World Championships – Men's omnium =

Men's omnium at the 2016 UCI Track Cycling World Championships
- Venue: Lee Valley VeloPark, London
- Date: 4–5 March
- Competitors: 20 from 20 nations
- Winning points: 191

Medalists
gold medal	Fernando Gaviria	Colombia
silver medal	Roger Kluge	Germany
bronze medal	Glenn O'Shea	Australia

The Men's omnium event of the 2016 UCI Track Cycling World Championships was held on 4 and 5 March 2016. Fernando Gaviria of Colombia won the gold medal.

== Results ==
=== Scratch race ===
The scratch race was held at 09:46.

Rank	Name	Nation	Laps down
1	Thomas Boudat	France	
2	Artyom Zakharov	Kazakhstan	
3	Elia Viviani	Italy	
4	Roger Kluge	Germany	
5	Glenn O'Shea	Australia	
6	Mark Cavendish	Great Britain	
7	Jasper De Buyst	Belgium	
8	Viktor Manakov	Russia	
9	Gaël Suter	Switzerland	
10	Fernando Gaviria	Colombia	
11	Park Sang-hoon	South Korea	
12	Tim Veldt	Netherlands	
13	Kazushige Kuboki	Japan	
14	Leung Chun Wing	Hong Kong	
15	Adrian Tekliński	Poland	
16	Lasse Norman Hansen	Denmark	
17	Gideoni Monteiro	Brazil	
18	Ignacio Prado	Mexico	
19	Jacob Duehring	United States	
20	Aaron Gate	New Zealand	DNF

=== Individual pursuit ===
The individual pursuit was held at 16:02.

Rank	Name	Nation	Time	Behind
1	Fernando Gaviria	Colombia	4:19.000	
2	Lasse Norman Hansen	Denmark	4:19.866	+0.866
3	Elia Viviani	Italy	4:20.371	+1.371
4	Tim Veldt	Netherlands	4:21.793	+2.793
5	Aaron Gate	New Zealand	4:22.156	+3.156
6	Viktor Manakov	Russia	4:22.798	+3.798
7	Artyom Zakharov	Kazakhstan	4:22.843	+3.843
8	Roger Kluge	Germany	4:23.131	+4.131
9	Thomas Boudat	France	4:23.933	+4.933
10	Adrian Tekliński	Poland	4:24.946	+5.946
11	Leung Chun Wing	Hong Kong	4:26.584	+7.584
12	Park Sang-hoon	South Korea	4:27.194	+8.194
13	Mark Cavendish	Great Britain	4:27.453	+8.453
14	Ignacio Prado	Mexico	4:28.392	+9.392
15	Jasper De Buyst	Belgium	4:29.271	+10.271
16	Gaël Suter	Switzerland	4:29.590	+10.590
17	Glenn O'Shea	Australia	4:29.883	+10.883
18	Gideoni Monteiro	Brazil	4:30.285	+11.285
19	Kazushige Kuboki	Japan	4:36.601	+17.601
20	Jacob Duehring	United States	4:38.475	+19.475

=== Elimination race ===
The Elimination race was held at 20:10.

Rank	Name	Nation
1	Fernando Gaviria	Colombia
2	Mark Cavendish	Great Britain
3	Roger Kluge	Germany
4	Thomas Boudat	France
5	Elia Viviani	Italy
6	Glenn O'Shea	Australia
7	Viktor Manakov	Russia
8	Artyom Zakharov	Kazakhstan
9	Gideoni Monteiro	Brazil
10	Tim Veldt	Netherlands
11	Leung Chun Wing	Hong Kong
12	Kazushige Kuboki	Japan
13	Gaël Suter	Switzerland
14	Aaron Gate	New Zealand
15	Jasper De Buyst	Belgium
16	Lasse Norman Hansen	Denmark
17	Park Sang-hoon	South Korea
18	Adrian Tekliński	Poland
19	Ignacio Prado	Mexico
20	Jacob Duehring	United States

=== 1 km time trial ===
The 1 km time trial was started at 11:44.

Rank	Name	Nation	Time	Behind
1	Lasse Norman Hansen	Denmark	1:02.409	
2	Fernando Gaviria	Colombia	1:02.417	+0.008
3	Elia Viviani	Italy	1:02.632	+0.223
4	Tim Veldt	Netherlands	1:02.831	+0.422
5	Glenn O'Shea	Australia	1:02.836	+0.427
6	Adrian Tekliński	Poland	1:03.154	+0.745
7	Leung Chun Wing	Hong Kong	1:03.404	+0.995
8	Jasper De Buyst	Belgium	1:03.542	+1.133
9	Park Sang-hoon	South Korea	1:03.794	+1.385
10	Gaël Suter	Switzerland	1:03.989	+1.580
11	Roger Kluge	Germany	1:04.408	+1.999
12	Mark Cavendish	Great Britain	1:04.507	+2.098
13	Thomas Boudat	France	1:04.537	+2.128
14	Viktor Manakov	Russia	1:04.540	+2.131
15	Artyom Zakharov	Kazakhstan	1:04.613	+2.204
16	Ignacio Prado	Mexico	1:05.213	+2.804
17	Aaron Gate	New Zealand	1:05.215	+2.806
18	Jacob Duehring	United States	1:05.550	+3.141
19	Kazushige Kuboki	Japan	1:05.559	+3.150
20	Gideoni Monteiro	Brazil	1:06.988	+4.579

=== Flying lap ===
The Flying lap was held at 15:01.

Rank	Name	Nation	Time
1	Elia Viviani	Italy	13.149
2	Glenn O'Shea	Australia	13.183
3	Tim Veldt	Netherlands	13.187
4	Mark Cavendish	Great Britain	13.211
5	Adrian Tekliński	Poland	13.218
6	Park Sang-hoon	South Korea	13.326
7	Lasse Norman Hansen	Denmark	13.368
8	Fernando Gaviria	Colombia	13.383
9	Jasper De Buyst	Belgium	13.414
10	Gaël Suter	Switzerland	13.422
11	Roger Kluge	Germany	13.425
12	Viktor Manakov	Russia	13.513
13	Leung Chun Wing	Hong Kong	13.528
14	Artyom Zakharov	Kazakhstan	13.534
15	Thomas Boudat	France	13.573
16	Aaron Gate	New Zealand	13.666
17	Jacob Duehring	United States	13.681
18	Ignacio Prado	Mexico	13.703
19	Kazushige Kuboki	Japan	13.928
20	Gideoni Monteiro	Brazil	14.056

=== Points race ===
The Points race was held at 19:08.

Rank	Name	Nation	Points
1	Roger Kluge	Germany	55
2	Lasse Norman Hansen	Denmark	55
3	Glenn O'Shea	Australia	51
4	Kazushige Kuboki	Japan	47
5	Jasper De Buyst	Belgium	30
6	Ignacio Prado	Mexico	27
7	Mark Cavendish	Great Britain	25
8	Fernando Gaviria	Colombia	25
9	Elia Viviani	Italy	9
10	Artyom Zakharov	Kazakhstan	8
11	Gideoni Monteiro	Brazil	8
12	Gaël Suter	Switzerland	7
13	Aaron Gate	New Zealand	7
14	Leung Chun Wing	Hong Kong	6
15	Thomas Boudat	France	5
16	Viktor Manakov	Russia	5
17	Jacob Duehring	United States	5
18	Tim Veldt	Netherlands	1
19	Park Sang-hoon	South Korea	0
20	Adrian Tekliński	Poland	0

=== Final standings ===
After all events.

Rank	Name	Nation	Points
1st place, gold medalist(s)	Fernando Gaviria	Colombia	191
2nd place, silver medalist(s)	Roger Kluge	Germany	191
3rd place, bronze medalist(s)	Glenn O'Shea	Australia	191
4	Elia Viviani	Italy	189
5	Lasse Norman Hansen	Denmark	181
6	Mark Cavendish	Great Britain	161
7	Tim Veldt	Netherlands	145
8	Jasper De Buyst	Belgium	132
9	Thomas Boudat	France	131
10	Artyom Zakharov	Kazakhstan	126
11	Viktor Manakov	Russia	121
12	Leung Chun Wing	Hong Kong	104
13	Adrian Tekliński	Poland	102
14	Gaël Suter	Switzerland	101
15	Park Sang-hoon	South Korea	100
16	Kazushige Kuboki	Japan	93
17	Ignacio Prado	Mexico	67
18	Gideoni Monteiro	Brazil	50
19	Aaron Gate	New Zealand	31
20	Jacob Duehring	United States	27
