= 2016 UCI Track Cycling World Championships – Women's keirin =

Women's keirin at the 2016 UCI Track Cycling World Championships
- Venue: Lee Valley VeloPark, London
- Date: 3 March
- Competitors: 25 from 19 nations

Medalists
gold medal	Kristina Vogel	Germany
silver medal	Anna Meares	Australia
bronze medal	Becky James	Great Britain

The Women's keirin event of the 2016 UCI Track Cycling World Championships was held on 3 March 2016. Kristina Vogel of Germany won gold.

== Results ==
=== First round ===
The first round was started at 15:28.

==== Heat 1 ====
Rank	Name	Nation	Gap	Notes
1	Lyubov Shulika	Ukraine		Q
2	Lee Wai Sze	Hong Kong	+0.017	Q
3	Stephanie Morton	Australia	+0.027	
4	Olga Ismayilova	Azerbaijan	+0.275	
5	Kayono Maeda	Japan	+1.023	
6	Anastasia Voynova	Russia		REL

==== Heat 2 ====
Rank	Name	Nation	Gap	Notes
1	Guo Shuang	China		Q
2	Lee Hye-jin	South Korea	+0.107	Q
3	Becky James	Great Britain	+0.149	
4	Elis Ligtlee	Netherlands	+0.291	
5	Monique Sullivan	Canada	+0.323	
6	Lisandra Guerra	Cuba	+0.842	

==== Heat 3 ====
Rank	Name	Nation	Gap	Notes
1	Kristina Vogel	Germany		Q
2	Anna Meares	Australia	+0.762	Q
3	Natasha Hansen	New Zealand	+0.827	
4	Laurine van Riessen	Netherlands	+1.029	
5	Shannon McCurley	Ireland	+2.070	
6	Ekaterina Gnidenko	Russia		REL

==== Heat 4 ====
Rank	Name	Nation	Gap	Notes
1	Kaarle McCulloch	Australia		Q
2	Lin Junhong	China	+0.029	Q
3	Simona Krupeckaitė	Lithuania	+0.033	
4	Kate O'Brien	Canada	+0.072	
5	Tania Calvo	Spain	+0.101	
6	Fatehah Mustapa	Malaysia	+0.125	
7	Virginie Cueff	France	+0.136	

=== First round repechage ===
The first round repechage was started at 16:10.

==== Heat 1 ====
Rank	Name	Nation	Gap	Notes
1	Stephanie Morton	Australia		Q
2	Lisandra Guerra	Cuba	+0.188	
3	Kate O'Brien	Canada	+0.354	
4	Shannon McCurley	Ireland	+1.886	

==== Heat 2 ====
Rank	Name	Nation	Gap	Notes
1	Becky James	Great Britain		Q
2	Anastasia Voynova	Russia	+0.037	
3	Laurine van Riessen	Netherlands	+0.156	
4	Monique Sullivan	Canada	+0.302	

==== Heat 3 ====
Rank	Name	Nation	Gap	Notes
1	Elis Ligtlee	Netherlands		Q
2	Fatehah Mustapa	Malaysia	+0.048	
3	Natasha Hansen	New Zealand	+0.248	
4	Kayono Maeda	Japan	+0.411	

==== Heat 4 ====
Rank	Name	Nation	Gap	Notes
1	Virginie Cueff	France		Q
2	Ekaterina Gnidenko	Russia	+0.038	
3	Simona Krupeckaitė	Lithuania	+0.138	
4	Tania Calvo	Spain	+0.202	
5	Olga Ismayilova	Azerbaijan	+0.372	

=== Second round ===
The first round was started at 20:05.

==== Heat 1 ====
Rank	Name	Nation	Gap	Notes
1	Anna Meares	Australia		Q
2	Lyubov Shulika	Ukraine	+0.017	Q
3	Lee Hye-jin	South Korea	+0.083	Q
4	Virginie Cueff	France	+0.104	
5	Kaarle McCulloch	Australia	+0.124	
6	Stephanie Morton	Australia	+0.190	

==== Heat 2 ====
Rank	Name	Nation	Gap	Notes
1	Guo Shuang	China		Q
2	Kristina Vogel	Germany	+0.004	Q
3	Becky James	Great Britain	+0.086	Q
4	Lee Wai Sze	Hong Kong	+0.158	
5	Lin Junhong	China	+0.342	
6	Elis Ligtlee	Netherlands	+1.069	

=== Finals ===
The finals was started at 20:45.

==== Small final ====
Rank	Name	Nation	Gap	Notes
7	Stephanie Morton	Australia		
8	Kaarle McCulloch	Australia	+0.114	
9	Lee Wai Sze	Hong Kong	+0.129	
10	Virginie Cueff	France	+0.217	
11	Elis Ligtlee	Netherlands	+0.516	
12	Lin Junhong	China		REL

==== Final ====
Rank	Name	Nation	Gap	Notes
1st place, gold medalist(s)	Kristina Vogel	Germany		
2nd place, silver medalist(s)	Anna Meares	Australia	+0.078	
3rd place, bronze medalist(s)	Becky James	Great Britain	+0.106	
4	Guo Shuang	China	+0.171	
5	Lyubov Shulika	Ukraine	+0.296	
6	Lee Hye-jin	South Korea	+0.338	
