= 2016 UCI Track Cycling World Championships – Women's team sprint =

Women's team sprint at the 2016 UCI Track Cycling World Championships
- Venue: Lee Valley VeloPark, London
- Date: 2 March
- Competitors: 28 from 14 nations
- Teams: 14
- Winning time: 32.679

Medalists
| gold medal | Daria Shmeleva; Anastasia Voynova | Russia |
| silver medal | Gong Jinjie; Zhong Tianshi | China |
| bronze medal | Miriam Welte; Kristina Vogel | Germany |

The Women's team sprint event of the 2016 UCI Track Cycling World Championships was held on 2 March 2016. Initially, China won the final against Russia, but were relegated to silver after an illegal change.

== Results ==
=== Qualifying ===
The qualifying was started at 15:07.

| Rank | Name | Nation | Time | Behind | Notes |
|---|---|---|---|---|---|
| 1 | Gong Jinjie; Zhong Tianshi | China | 32.428 | | Q |
| 2 | Daria Shmeleva; Anastasia Voynova | Russia | 32.560 | +0.132 | Q |
| 3 | Miriam Welte; Kristina Vogel | Germany | 32.808 | +0.380 | q |
| 4 | Anna Meares; Stephanie Morton | Australia | 32.820 | +0.392 | q |
| 5 | Jessica Varnish; Katy Marchant | Great Britain | 32.903 | +0.475 | |
| 6 | Laurine van Riessen; Elis Ligtlee | Netherlands | 33.133 | +0.705 | |
| 7 | Sandie Clair; Virginie Cueff | France | 33.258 | +0.830 | |
| 8 | Tania Calvo; Helena Casas | Spain | 33.455 | +1.027 | |
| 9 | Kate O'Brien; Monique Sullivan | Canada | 33.867 | +1.439 | |
| 10 | Natasha Hansen; Olivia Podmore | New Zealand | 33.932 | +1.504 | |
| 11 | Martha Bayona; Juliana Gaviria | Colombia | 34.171 | +1.743 | |
| 12 | Jessica Salazar; Luz Gaxiola | Mexico | 34.236 | +1.808 | |
| 13 | Olena Starikova; Lyubov Shulika | Ukraine | 34.300 | +1.872 | |
| 14 | Takako Ishii; Kayono Maeda | Japan | 34.721 | +2.293 | |

=== Finals ===
The finals were started at 20:50.

| Rank | Name | Nation | Time | Behind | Notes |
|---|---|---|---|---|---|
Gold medal race
| 1st place, gold medalist(s) | Daria Shmeleva; Anastasia Voynova | Russia | 32.679 | | |
| 2nd place, silver medalist(s) | Gong Jinjie; Zhong Tianshi | China | REL | | |
Bronze medal race
| 3rd place, bronze medalist(s) | Miriam Welte; Kristina Vogel | Germany | 32.740 | | |
| 4 | Anna Meares; Stephanie Morton | Australia | 32.871 | +0.131 | |
