= 2016 UCI Track Cycling World Championships – Men's scratch =

Men's scratch at the 2016 UCI Track Cycling World Championships
- Venue: Lee Valley VeloPark, London
- Date: 2 March
- Competitors: 22 from 22 nations

Medalists
gold medal	Sebastián Mora	Spain
silver medal	Ignacio Prado	Mexico
bronze medal	Claudio Imhof	Switzerland

The UCI Men's scratch event of the 2016 UCI Track Cycling World Championships was held on 2 March 2016. Sebastián Mora won the gold medal.

== Results ==
The race was started at 19:20.

Rank	Name	Nation	Laps down
1st place, gold medalist(s)	Sebastián Mora	Spain	
2nd place, silver medalist(s)	Ignacio Prado	Mexico	
3rd place, bronze medalist(s)	Claudio Imhof	Switzerland	
4	Raman Ramanau	Belarus	
5	Cheung King Lok	Hong Kong	
6	Vojtěch Hačecký	Czech Republic	
7	Lucas Liss	Germany	−1
8	Rui Oliveira	Portugal	−1
9	Christopher Latham	Great Britain	−1
10	Felix English	Ireland	−1
11	Moreno De Pauw	Belgium	−1
12	Elia Viviani	Italy	−1
13	Roman Gladysh	Ukraine	−1
14	Andreas Müller	Austria	−1
15	Glenn O'Shea	Australia	−1
16	Morgan Kneisky	France	−2
17	Jacob Duehring	United States	−2
18	Robert Gaineyev	Kazakhstan	−2
19	Adrian Tekliński	Poland	−2
20	Wim Stroetinga	Netherlands	−2
21	Alex Frame	New Zealand	−2
	Jean Spies	South Africa	DNF
