= Uzbekistan at the UCI Track Cycling World Championships =

- IOC code: UZB
- Competitors: 2 in 2 events
- Medals: Gold 0 Silver 0 Bronze 0 Total 0

This page is an overview of Uzbekistan at the UCI Track Cycling World Championships.

Uzbekistani athletes have been competing under the Uzbekistan flag since 26 December 1991 when they left the Soviet Union. As of 2023 no cyclist has won a medal for Uzbekistan.

== 2015 ==
Uzbekistan competed at the 2015 UCI Track Cycling World Championships in Saint-Quentin-en-Yvelines at the Vélodrome de Saint-Quentin-en-Yvelines from 18–22 February 2015. A team of 1 cyclists (0 women, 1 men) represented the country in the event.

== 2022 ==
The 2022 UCI Track Cycling World Championships were held from 12 October to 16 October 2022 at the Vélodrome National in Saint-Quentin-en-Yvelines, France. Four male and four female riders rode in the world championships.

== 2023 ==
The 2023 UCI Track Cycling World Championships occurred as part of the larger 2023 UCI Cycling World Championships event between 3 and 9 August 2023. Uzbekistan sent a team of two females to contest in the elimination race and the madison.

== Results ==
=== Men ===
Name	Event	Result	Place
2015
Timur Gumerov	Men's omnium	−13 points	21
2022
Aleksey Fomovskiy	Men's individual pursuit	+41.997s	25
Dmitriy Bocharov; Edem Eminov; Danil Evdokimov; Aleksey Fomovskiy	Men's team pursuit	+24.975s	16

=== Women ===
Name	Event	Result	Place
2022
Sofiya Karimova; Nafosat Kozieva	Women's madison	DNF	
Yanina Kuskova	Women's points race	0	21
Yanina Kuskova	Women's individual pursuit	+23.898	21
Sofiya Karimova; Nafosat Kozieva; Yanina Kuskova; Margarita Misyurina	Women's team pursuit	+31.421s	15
2023
Nafosat Kozieva	Women's elimination	18	
Nafosat Kozieva; Margarita Misyurina	Women's madison	DNF	

Legend
NR	Not yet raced
DNF	Did not finish
DSQ	Disqualified
