= 2016 UCI Track Cycling World Championships – Men's points race =

Men's points race at the 2016 UCI Track Cycling World Championships
- Venue: Lee Valley VeloPark, London
- Date: 4 March
- Competitors: 22 from 22 nations

Medalists
gold medal	Jonathan Dibben	Great Britain
silver medal	Andreas Graf	Austria
bronze medal	Kenny De Ketele	Belgium

The Men's points race event of the 2016 UCI Track Cycling World Championships was held on 4 March 2016. Jonathan Dibben of Great Britain won the gold medal.

== Results ==
160 laps (40 km) were raced with 16 sprints.

Rank	Name	Nation	Sprint points	Lap points	Total points
1st place, gold medalist(s)	Jonathan Dibben	Great Britain	28	20	48
2nd place, silver medalist(s)	Andreas Graf	Austria	28	20	48
3rd place, bronze medalist(s)	Kenny De Ketele	Belgium	23	20	43
4	Benjamin Thomas	France	21	20	41
5	Eiya Hashimoto	Japan	11	20	31
6	Raman Ramanau	Belarus	13	0	13
7	Sam Welsford	Australia	7	0	7
8	Luis Fernando Sepúlveda	Chile	6	0	6
9	Cheung King Lok	Hong Kong	6	0	6
10	Nikita Panassenko	Kazakhstan	3	0	3
11	Ian Holt	United States	2	0	2
12	Eloy Teruel	Spain	1	0	1
13	Claudio Imhof	Switzerland	0	0	0
14	Wojciech Pszczolarski	Poland	1	−20	−19
15	Artur Ershov	Russia	0	−20	−20
16	Martin Bláha	Czech Republic	0	−20	−20
—	Vitaliy Hryniv	Ukraine	DNF		
—	Luke Mudgway	New Zealand	DNF		
—	Ivo Oliveira	Portugal	DNF		
—	Liam Bertazzo	Italy	DNF		
—	Felix English	Ireland	DNF		
—	Leif Lampater	Germany	DNS		
