= 2015 UCI Track Cycling World Championships – Men's 1 km time trial =

Men's 1 km time trial at the 2015 UCI Track Cycling World Championships
- Venue: Vélodrome de Saint-Quentin-en-Yvelines
- Location: Saint-Quentin-en-Yvelines, France
- Date: 20 February 2015
- Competitors: 19 from 12 nations
- Winning time: 1:00.207

Medalists
gold medal	François Pervis	France
silver medal	Joachim Eilers	Germany
bronze medal	Matt Archibald	New Zealand

The Men's 1 km time trial event of the 2015 UCI Track Cycling World Championships was held on 20 February 2015.

== Results ==
The race was started at 19:00.

Rank	Name	Nation	Time	Notes
1st place, gold medalist(s)	François Pervis	France	1:00.207	
2nd place, silver medalist(s)	Joachim Eilers	Germany	1:00.294	
3rd place, bronze medalist(s)	Matt Archibald	New Zealand	1:00.470	
4	Quentin Lafargue	France	1:00.648	
5	Fabián Puerta	Colombia	1:00.907	
6	Michaël D'Almeida	France	1:01.036	
7	Callum Skinner	Great Britain	1:01.071	
8	Im Chae-bin	South Korea	1:01.103	
9	Simon van Velthooven	New Zealand	1:01.157	
10	Kamil Kuczyński	Poland	1:01.583	
11	Eric Engler	Germany	1:01.653	
12	Kian Emadi	Great Britain	1:01.736	
13	Francesco Ceci	Italy	1:01.924	
14	Robin Wagner	Czech Republic	1:01.976	
15	Anderson Parra	Colombia	1:02.126	
16	Hugo Haak	Netherlands	1:02.230	
17	Tomáš Bábek	Czech Republic	1:02.771	
18	Wu Lok Chun	Hong Kong	1:04.043	
19	Eugene Soule	South Africa	1:08.422	
	José Moreno	Spain	DNS	
