= 2015 UCI Track Cycling World Championships – Women's 500 m time trial =

Women's 500 m time trial at the 2015 UCI Track Cycling World Championships
- Venue: Vélodrome de Saint-Quentin-en-Yvelines, Saint-Quentin-en-Yvelines
- Date: 19 February 2015
- Competitors: 21 from 16 nations
- Winning time: 33.149

Medalists
gold medal	Anastasiia Voinova	Russia
silver medal	Anna Meares	Australia
bronze medal	Miriam Welte	Germany

The Women's 500 m time trial event of the 2015 UCI Track Cycling World Championships was held on 19 February 2015.

== Results ==
The race was started at 19:00.

Rank	Name	Nation	Time	Notes
1st place, gold medalist(s)	Anastasiia Voinova	Russia	33.149	
2nd place, silver medalist(s)	Anna Meares	Australia	33.425	
3rd place, bronze medalist(s)	Miriam Welte	Germany	33.699	
4	Elis Ligtlee	Netherlands	33.775	
5	Lee Wai Sze	Hong Kong	33.788	
6	Virginie Cueff	France	33.926	
7	Elena Brejniva	Russia	33.999	
8	Daria Shmeleva	Russia	34.141	
9	Lisandra Guerra	Cuba	34.226	
10	Tania Calvo	Spain	34.280	
11	Sandie Clair	France	34.425	
12	Katie Schofield	New Zealand	34.595	
13	Katy Marchant	Great Britain	34.633	
14	Stephanie McKenzie	New Zealand	34.722	
15	Victoria Williamson	Great Britain	34.904	
16	Juliana Gaviria	Colombia	35.123	
17	Luz Gaxiola	Mexico	35.803	
18	Kate O'Brien	Canada	35.921	
19	Mariaesthela Vilera	Venezuela	35.926	
20	Olena Tsyos	Ukraine	36.286	
21	Annerine Wenhold	South Africa	39.054	
