= 2016 UCI Track Cycling World Championships – Men's madison =

Men's madison at the 2016 UCI Track Cycling World Championships
- Venue: Lee Valley VeloPark, London
- Date: 6 March
- Competitors: 32 from 16 nations
- Teams: 16
- Winning points: 21

Medalists
gold medal	Bradley Wiggins; Mark Cavendish	Great Britain
silver medal	Morgan Kneisky; Benjamin Thomas	France
bronze medal	Sebastián Mora; Albert Torres	Spain

The Men's madison event of the 2016 UCI Track Cycling World Championships was held on 6 March 2016. The Great Britain team of Bradley Wiggins and Mark Cavendish won the gold medal.

== Results ==
The race consisted of 200 laps (50 km) with 10 sprints and was completed in 52:22, resulting in an average speed of 57.277 kilometres (35.590 mi).

Rank	Name	Nation	Points	Laps down
1st place, gold medalist(s)	Bradley Wiggins; Mark Cavendish	Great Britain	21	
2nd place, silver medalist(s)	Morgan Kneisky; Benjamin Thomas	France	14	
3rd place, bronze medalist(s)	Sebastián Mora; Albert Torres	Spain	12	
4	Claudio Imhof; Théry Schir	Switzerland	11	
5	Cameron Meyer; Callum Scotson	Australia	10	
6	Jordan Parra; Fernando Gaviria	Colombia	6	
7	Kenny De Ketele; Moreno De Pauw	Belgium	15	−1
8	Martin Bláha; Vojtěch Hačecký	Czech Republic	1	−1
9	Kersten Thiele; Domenic Weinstein	Germany	1	−1
10	Andreas Müller; Andreas Graf	Austria	1	−1
11	Pieter Bulling; Luke Mudgway	New Zealand	1	−1
12	Alex Rasmussen; Jesper Mørkøv	Denmark	2	−2
13	Dion Beukeboom; Wim Stroetinga	Netherlands	2	−2
14	Cheung King Lok; Leung Chun Wing	Hong Kong	0	−3
15	Elia Viviani; Liam Bertazzo	Italy	10	−4
—	Vladyslav Kreminskyi; Roman Gladysh	Ukraine	DNF	
