= 2015 UCI Track Cycling World Championships – Women's team sprint =

Women's team sprint at the 2015 UCI Track Cycling World Championships
- Venue: Vélodrome de Saint-Quentin-en-Yvelines, Saint-Quentin-en-Yvelines
- Date: 18 February 2015
- Competitors: 30 from 15 nations
- Winning time: 32.034

Medalists
gold medal	Gong Jinjie; Zhong Tianshi	China
silver medal	Daria Shmeleva; Anastasiia Voinova	Russia
bronze medal	Kaarle McCulloch; Anna Meares	Australia

The Women's team sprint event of the 2015 UCI Track Cycling World Championships was held on 18 February 2015.

== Results ==
=== Qualifying ===
The qualifying was held at 20:00.

Rank	Name	Nation	Time	Notes
1	Daria Shmeleva; Anastasiia Voinova	Russia	32.518	Q
2	Gong Jinjie; Zhong Tianshi	China	32.562	Q
3	Kristina Vogel; Miriam Welte	Germany	32.712	q
4	Kaarle McCulloch; Anna Meares	Australia	32.878	q
5	Shanne Braspennincx; Elis Ligtlee	Netherlands	33.463	
6	Sandie Clair; Olivia Montauban	France	33.476	
7	Tania Calvo; Helena Casas	Spain	33.556	
8	Jessica Varnish; Victoria Williamson	Great Britain	33.583	
9	Stephanie McKenzie; Katie Schofield	New Zealand	33.715	
10	Martha Bayona; Juliana Gaviria	Colombia	34.458	
11	Frany Fong; Luz Gaxiola	Mexico	34.614	
12	Kate O'Brien; Monique Sullivan	Canada	34.994	
13	Takako Ishii; Kayono Maeda	Japan	35.318	
14	Olena Starikova; Olena Tsyos	Ukraine	35.880	
15	Diao Xiao Juan; Meng Zhao Juan	Hong Kong	37.053	

=== Finals ===
The finals were started at 21:15.

Rank	Name	Nation	Time	Notes
Gold medal race
1st place, gold medalist(s)	Gong Jinjie; Zhong Tianshi	China	32.034	WR
2nd place, silver medalist(s)	Daria Shmeleva; Anastasiia Voinova	Russia	32.438	
Bronze medal race
3rd place, bronze medalist(s)	Kaarle McCulloch; Anna Meares	Australia	32.723	
4	Kristina Vogel; Miriam Welte	Germany	32.817	
