= Colombia at the UCI Track Cycling World Championships =

Colombia at the 2015 UCI Track Cycling World Championships
- IOC code: COL

in Saint-Quentin-en-Yvelines, France 18 February – 22 February 2015
- Competitors: 14
- Medals Ranked 8th: Gold 1 Silver 0 Bronze 0 Total 1

UCI Track Cycling World Championships appearances (overview)
- Overview page Recent: 2008; 2009; 2010; 2011; 2012; 2013; 2014; 2015; 2016; 2017; 2018; 2019; 2020; 2021; 2022; 2023; 2024; 2025

Colombia competed at the 2015 UCI Track Cycling World Championships in Saint-Quentin-en-Yvelines at the Vélodrome de Saint-Quentin-en-Yvelines from 18–22 February 2015. A team of 14 cyclists (5 women, 9 men) was announced to represent the country in the event.

== Results ==
=== Men ===
Name	Event	Result	Rank
Anderson Parra	Men's sprint	10.048	28
Fabián Puerta	Men's sprint	—	DNS
Fabián Puerta	Men's 1 km time trial	1:00.907	5
Anderson Parra	Men's 1 km time trial	1:02.126	15
Edwin Ávila	Men's points race	4 points	16
Fernando Gaviria	Men's omnium	205 points	1st place, gold medalist(s)
Fabián Puerta	Men's keirin		7
Anderson Parra	Men's keirin		17
Juan Esteban Arango; Weimar Roldán	Men's madison	5 points	10
Fernando Gaviria; Edwin Ávila; Juan Esteban Arango; Weimar Roldán	Men's team pursuit	4:03.908	12
Rubén Murillo; Anderson Parra; Julián Suárez	Men's team sprint	44.865	16

=== Women ===
Name	Event	Result	Rank
Diana García	Women's sprint	11.286	25
Juliana Gaviria	Women's sprint	11.307	26
Juliana Gaviria	Women's 500 m time trial	35.123	16
María Luisa Calle	Women's individual pursuit	3:39.592	12
María Luisa Calle	Women's points race	3 points	13
Milena Salcedo	Women's scratch	—	9
Martha Bayona; Juliana Gaviria	Women's team sprint	34.458	10
Juliana Gaviria	Women's keirin		17

== 2016 ==
Colombia at the 2016 UCI Track Cycling World Championships
- IOC code: COL

in London, United Kingdom 2 March – 6 March 2016
- Competitors: 7 (5 men, 2 women)
- Medals Ranked 10th: Gold 1 Silver 0 Bronze 0 Total 1

UCI Track Cycling World Championships appearances (overview)
- Recent: 2008; 2009; 2010; 2011; 2012; 2013; 2014; 2015; 2016; 2017; 2018; 2019; 2020; 2021; 2022; 2023; 2024; 2025

Colombia competed at the 2016 UCI Track Cycling World Championships at the Lee Valley VeloPark in London, United Kingdom from 2–4 March 2016. A team of 7 cyclists (2 women, 5 men) was announced to represent the country in the event.

=== Men ===
Name	Event	Result	Rank
Fabián Puerta	Men's sprint		5
Santiago Ramírez	Men's sprint		30
Santiago Ramírez	Men's 1 km time trial	01:02.207	9
Fabián Puerta	Men's keirin	—	17
Fernando Gaviria	Men's omniun	191 points	1st place, gold medalist(s)
Jordan Parra; Fernando Gaviria	Men's madison	6 points	6

=== Women ===
Name	Event	Result	Rank
Juliana Gaviria	Women's sprint		21
Martha Bayona	Women's sprint		26
Martha Bayona	Women's 500 m time trial	34.903 sec	12
Martha Bayona; Juliana Gaviria	Women's team sprint	34.171	11
