= Greece at the UCI Track Cycling World Championships =

Greece at the 2015 UCI Track Cycling World Championships
- IOC code: GRE

in Saint-Quentin-en-Yvelines, France 18 February – 22 February 2015
- Competitors: 2
- Medals Ranked -th: Gold 0 Silver 0 Bronze 0 Total 0

UCI Track Cycling World Championships appearances (overview)
- Overview page Recent: 2008; 2009; 2010; 2011; 2012; 2013; 2014; 2015; 2016; 2017; 2018; 2019; 2020; 2021; 2022; 2023; 2024; 2025

Greece competed at the 2015 UCI Track Cycling World Championships in Saint-Quentin-en-Yvelines at the Vélodrome de Saint-Quentin-en-Yvelines from 18–22 February 2015. A team of 2 cyclists (0 women, 2 men) was announced to represent the country in the event.

== Results ==
=== Men ===
Name	Event	Result	Rank
Ioannis Spanopoulos	Men's omnium	55 points	19
Christos Volikakis	Men's keirin		13
