= Lithuania at the UCI Track Cycling World Championships =

Lithuania at UCI Track Cycling World Championships have been competing regularly since 1990 and won its first medals in 1992.

== List of medalists ==
Medal	Name	Year	Event
Silver	Jonas Romanovas	(Spain) 1992	Men's points race
Bronze	Artūras Kasputis	(Spain) 1992	Men's individual pursuit
Silver	Remigijus Lupeikis	(Colombia) 1995	Men's points race
Bronze	Rasa Mažeikytė	(Germany) 1999	Women's individual pursuit
Silver	Edita Kubelskienė	(Germany) 2003	Women's points race
Bronze	Simona Krupeckaitė	(Australia) 2004	Women's 500 m time trial
Silver	Simona Krupeckaitė	(United Kingdom) 2008	Women's 500 m time trial
Silver	Simona Krupeckaitė	(United Kingdom) 2008	Women's sprint
Gold	Simona Krupeckaitė	(Poland) 2009	Women's 500 m time trial
Bronze	Simona Krupeckaitė	(Poland) 2009	Women's sprint
Bronze	Simona Krupeckaitė; Gintarė Gaivenytė	(Poland) 2009	Women's team sprint
Bronze	Vilija Sereikaitė	(Poland) 2009	Women's individual pursuit
Gold	Simona Krupeckaitė	(Denmark) 2010	Women's keirin
Silver	Simona Krupeckaitė	(Denmark) 2010	Women's 500 m time trial
Bronze	Simona Krupeckaitė	(Denmark) 2010	Women's sprint
Bronze	Simona Krupeckaitė; Gintarė Gaivenytė	(Denmark) 2010	Women's team sprint
Bronze	Vilija Sereikaitė	(Denmark) 2010	Women's individual pursuit
Silver	Simona Krupeckaitė	(Netherlands) 2011	Women's sprint
Bronze	Vilija Sereikaitė	(Netherlands) 2011	Women's individual pursuit
Silver	Simona Krupeckaitė	(Australia) 2012	Women's sprint
Bronze	Simona Krupeckaitė	(Netherlands) 2018	Women's keirin

=== Medals by event ===
Event	Gold	Silver	Bronze	Total
Women's 500 m TT	1	2	1	4
Women's keirin	1	0	1	2
Women's sprint	0	3	2	5
Men's points race	0	2	0	2
Women's points race	0	1	0	1
Women's ind. pursuit	0	0	4	4
Women's team sprint	0	0	2	2
Men's individual pursuit	0	0	1	1
Totals (8 entries)	2	8	11	21

== 2015 ==
Lithuania at the 2015 UCI Track Cycling World Championships
- IOC code: LTU

in Saint-Quentin-en-Yvelines, France 18 February – 22 February 2015
- Competitors: 4
- Medals Ranked -th: Gold 0 Silver 0 Bronze 0 Total 0

UCI Track Cycling World Championships appearances (overview)
- Overview page Recent: 2008; 2009; 2010; 2011; 2012; 2013; 2014; 2015; 2016; 2017; 2018; 2019; 2020; 2021; 2022; 2023; 2024; 2025

Lithuania competed at the 2015 UCI Track Cycling World Championships in Saint-Quentin-en-Yvelines at the Vélodrome de Saint-Quentin-en-Yvelines from 18 to 22 February 2015. A team of 4 cyclists (4 women, 0 men) was announced to represent the country in the event.

=== Women ===
Name	Event	Result	Rank
Simona Krupeckaitė	Women's sprint	10.902 (Q),	7
Gintarė Gaivenytė	Women's sprint	11.508	29
Edita Mazurevičiūtė	Women's individual pursuit	3:42.610	15
Aušrinė Trebaitė	Women's omnium	75 points	16
Simona Krupeckaitė	Women's keirin		21

== 2016 ==
Lithuania at the 2016 UCI Track Cycling World Championships
- IOC code: LTU

in London, United Kingdom 2 March – 6 March 2016
- Competitors: 4 (0 men, 4 women)

UCI Track Cycling World Championships appearances (overview)
- Recent: 2008; 2009; 2010; 2011; 2012; 2013; 2014; 2015; 2016; 2017; 2018; 2019; 2020; 2021; 2022; 2023; 2024; 2025

Lithuania competed at the 2016 UCI Track Cycling World Championships at the Lee Valley VeloPark in London, United Kingdom from 2–4 March 2016. A team of 4 cyclists (4 women, 0 men) was announced to represent the country in the event.

=== Women ===
Name	Event	Result	Rank
Migle Marozaite	Women's sprint		32
Migle Marozaite	Women's 500 m time trial	35.350 sec	14
Edita Mazureviciute	Women's individual pursuit	03:46.051	11
Simona Krupeckaitė	Women's keirin		17
Aušrinė Trebaitė	Women's points race	-12 points (1 lap down)	20
