= China at the UCI Track Cycling World Championships =

China at the 2015 UCI Track Cycling World Championships
- IOC code: CHN

in Saint-Quentin-en-Yvelines, France 18 February – 22 February 2015
- Competitors: 21
- Medals Ranked 7th: Gold 1 Silver 0 Bronze 1 Total 2

UCI Track Cycling World Championships appearances (overview)
- Overview page Recent: 2008; 2009; 2010; 2011; 2012; 2013; 2014; 2015; 2016; 2017; 2018; 2019; 2020; 2021; 2022; 2023; 2024; 2025

China competed at the 2015 UCI Track Cycling World Championships in Saint-Quentin-en-Yvelines at the Vélodrome de Saint-Quentin-en-Yvelines from 18–22 February 2015. A team of 21 cyclists (12 women, 9 men) was announced to represent the country in the event.

== Results ==
=== Men ===
| Name | Event | Result | Rank |
|---|---|---|---|
| Xu Chao | Men's sprint | 9.876 (Q), | 18 |
| Liu Hao | Men's omnium | 115 points | 14 |
| Liu Hao; Liu Wei; Qin Chenlu; Shen Pingan | Men's team pursuit | 4:06.129 | 15 |
| Bao Saifei; Hu Ke; Xu Chao | Men's team sprint | 44.253 | 12 |

=== Women ===
| Name | Event | Result | Rank |
|---|---|---|---|
| Zhong Tianshi | Women's sprint | 10.627 (Q), | 3rd place, bronze medalist(s) |
| Guo Shuang | Women's sprint | 10.784 (Q), | 5 |
| Tian Yuanyuan | Women's omnium | 68 points | 17 |
| Huang Dongyan; Jiang Wenwen; Jing Yali; Zhao Baofang | Women's team pursuit | 4:27.645 (q), | 5 |
| Gong Jinjie; Zhong Tianshi | Women's team sprint | 32.562 (Q), | 1st place, gold medalist(s) |
| Lin Junhong | Women's keirin | | 5 |
| Zhong Tianshi | Women's keirin | | 10 |
| Guo Shuang | Women's keirin | | 11 |

== 2016 ==
China at the 2016 UCI Track Cycling World Championships
- IOC code: CHN

in London, United Kingdom 2 March – 6 March 2016
- Competitors: 20 (9 men, 11 women)
- Medals: Gold 0 Silver 1 Bronze 0 Total 1

UCI Track Cycling World Championships appearances (overview)
- Recent: 2008; 2009; 2010; 2011; 2012; 2013; 2014; 2015; 2016; 2017; 2018; 2019; 2020; 2021; 2022; 2023; 2024; 2025

China competed at the 2016 UCI Track Cycling World Championships at the Lee Valley VeloPark in London, United Kingdom from 2–4 March 2016. A team of 20 cyclists (11 women, 9 men) was announced to represent the country in the event.

== Results ==
=== Men ===
| Name | Event | Result | Rank |
|---|---|---|---|
| Hu Ke; Bao Saifei; Xu Chao | Men's team sprint | 44.496 | 9 |
| Fan Yang; Liu Hao; Qin Chenlu; Shen Pingan | Men's team pursuit | | 10 |
| Chao Xu | Men's sprint | | 12 |
| Saifei Bao | Men's sprint | | 32 |
| Chao Xu | Men's keirin | — | 13 |

=== Women ===
| Name | Event | Result | Rank |
|---|---|---|---|
| Tianshi Zhong | Women's sprint | | 1 |
| Lin Junhong | Women's sprint | | 2 |
| Jinjie Gong | Women's sprint | | 16 |
| Shuang Guo | Women's keirin | | 4 |
| Lin Junhong | Women's keirin | | 12 |
| Xiao Ling Luo | Women's omnium | 70 points | 16 |
| Huang Dongyan; Jing Yali; Ma Menglu; Zhao Baofang | Women's team pursuit | 04:29.941 (q), 04:27.508 (f) | 8 |
| Gong Jinjie; Zhong Tianshi | Women's team sprint | 32.428 (q), REL (f) | 2 |
