= 2015 UCI Track Cycling World Championships – Men's individual pursuit =

Men's individual pursuit at the 2015 UCI Track Cycling World Championships
- Venue: Vélodrome de Saint-Quentin-en-Yvelines
- Location: Saint-Quentin-en-Yvelines, France
- Date: 21 February 2015
- Competitors: 20 from 15 nations
- Winning time: 4:18.915

Medalists
gold medal	Stefan Küng	Switzerland
silver medal	Jack Bobridge	Australia
bronze medal	Julien Morice	France

The Men's individual pursuit event of the 2015 UCI Track Cycling World Championships was held on 21 February 2015.

== Results ==
=== Qualifying ===
The qualifying was started at 17:10.

Rank	Name	Nation	Time	Notes
1	Jack Bobridge	Australia	4:16.219	Q
2	Stefan Küng	Switzerland	4:17.183	Q
3	Alexander Serov	Russia	4:19.284	q
4	Julien Morice	France	4:19.684	q
5	Andrew Tennant	Great Britain	4:20.733	
6	Kersten Thiele	Germany	4:21.724	
7	Ryan Mullen	Ireland	4:22.669	
8	Alexander Edmondson	Australia	4:23.272	
9	Miles Scotson	Australia	4:23.480	
10	Dylan Kennett	New Zealand	4:25.388	
11	Dominique Cornu	Belgium	4:26.032	
12	Alexander Evtushenko	Russia	4:26.875	
13	Bobby Lea	United States	4:27.477	
14	Sebastián Mora	Spain	4:27.898	
15	Tom Bohli	Switzerland	4:29.594	
16	Marco Coledan	Italy	4:30.403	
17	Volodymyr Dzhus	Ukraine	4:32.507	
18	Liam Bertazzo	Italy	4:33.110	
19	Aleh Ahiyevich	Belarus	4:33.983	
20	Cheung King Lok	Hong Kong	4:55.764	

=== Finals ===
The finals were started at 20:55.

Rank	Name	Nation	Time
Gold Medal Race
1st place, gold medalist(s)	Stefan Küng	Switzerland	4:18.915
2nd place, silver medalist(s)	Jack Bobridge	Australia	4:19.184
Bronze Medal Race
3rd place, bronze medalist(s)	Julien Morice	France	4:21.419
4	Alexander Serov	Russia	4:21.801
