= 2016 UCI Track Cycling World Championships – Men's keirin =

Men's keirin at the 2016 UCI Track Cycling World Championships
- Venue: Lee Valley VeloPark, London
- Date: 6 March
- Competitors: 25 from 21 nations

Medalists
gold medal	Joachim Eilers	Germany
silver medal	Eddie Dawkins	New Zealand
bronze medal	Azizulhasni Awang	Malaysia

The Men's keirin event of the 2016 UCI Track Cycling World Championships was held on 6 March 2016. Joachim Eilers of Germany won the gold medal.

== Results ==
=== First round ===
The first round was held at 11:00.

==== Heat 1 ====
Rank	Name	Nation	Gap	Notes
1	Sam Webster	New Zealand		Q
2	Im Chae-bin	South Korea	+0.062	Q
3	Adam Ptáčník	Czech Republic	+0.063	
4	Nikita Shurshin	Russia	+0.115	
5	Hersony Canelón	Venezuela	+0.344	
6	François Pervis	France	+1.745	

==== Heat 2 ====
Rank	Name	Nation	Gap	Notes
1	Yuta Wakimoto	Japan		Q
2	Eddie Dawkins	New Zealand	+0.311	Q
3	Hugo Barrette	Canada	+0.378	
4	Jacob Schmid	Australia	+0.383	
5	Francesco Ceci	Italy	+0.565	
6	Xu Chao	China	+2.061	

==== Heat 3 ====
Rank	Name	Nation	Gap	Notes
1	Maximilian Levy	Germany		Q
2	Jason Kenny	Great Britain	+0.109	Q
3	Azizulhasni Awang	Malaysia	+0.310	
4	Rafał Sarnecki	Poland	+0.312	
5	Matthijs Büchli	Netherlands	DNF	
6	Matthew Baranoski	United States	DNF	

==== Heat 4 ====
Rank	Name	Nation	Gap	Notes
1	Joachim Eilers	Germany		Q
2	Sergiy Omelchenko	Azerbaijan	+0.252	Q
3	Fabián Puerta	Colombia	+0.297	
4	Pavel Kelemen	Czech Republic	+0.524	
5	Matthew Glaetzer	Australia	+0.534	
6	Andriy Vynokurov	Ukraine	+0.833	
7	Michaël D'Almeida	France	+1.220	

=== First round repechage ===
The first round repechage was held at 12:00.

==== Heat 1 ====
Rank	Name	Nation	Gap	Notes
1	Pavel Kelemen	Czech Republic		Q
2	Xu Chao	China	+0.068	
3	Matthijs Büchli	Netherlands	DNF	
	Adam Ptáčník	Czech Republic	DSQ	

==== Heat 2 ====
Rank	Name	Nation	Gap	Notes
1	François Pervis	France		Q
2	Francesco Ceci	Italy	+0.076	
3	Rafał Sarnecki	Poland	+0.197	
4	Hugo Barrette	Canada	+0.424	

==== Heat 3 ====
Rank	Name	Nation	Gap	Notes
1	Azizulhasni Awang	Malaysia		Q
2	Andriy Vynokurov	Ukraine	+0.073	
3	Jacob Schmid	Australia	+0.389	
4	Hersony Canelón	Venezuela	+0.591	

==== Heat 4 ====
Rank	Name	Nation	Gap	Notes
1	Nikita Shurshin	Russia		Q
2	Matthew Glaetzer	Australia	+0.072	
3	Fabián Puerta	Colombia	+0.104	
4	Michaël D'Almeida	France	+0.193	
5	Matthew Baranoski	United States	+0.924	

=== Second round ===
The second round was started at 14:16.

==== Heat 1 ====
Rank	Name	Nation	Gap	Notes
1	Joachim Eilers	Germany		Q
2	Eddie Dawkins	New Zealand	+0.007	Q
3	Jason Kenny	Great Britain	+0.060	Q
4	Nikita Shurshin	Russia	+0.163	
5	Pavel Kelemen	Czech Republic	+0.415	
6	Sam Webster	New Zealand	+1.180	

==== Heat 2 ====
Rank	Name	Nation	Gap	Notes
1	Maximilian Levy	Germany		Q
2	Azizulhasni Awang	Malaysia	+0.162	Q
3	Yuta Wakimoto	Japan	+0.197	Q
4	François Pervis	France	+0.306	
5	Sergiy Omelchenko	Azerbaijan	+0.306	
6	Im Chae-bin	South Korea	+0.306	

=== Finals ===
The finals were started at 15:47.

==== Small final ====
Rank	Name	Nation	Gap	Notes
7	Sergiy Omelchenko	Azerbaijan		
8	Nikita Shurshin	Russia	+0.010	
9	Im Chae-bin	South Korea	+0.090	
10	Sam Webster	New Zealand	+0.136	
11	Pavel Kelemen	Czech Republic	+0.237	
12	François Pervis	France	+2.983	

==== Final ====
Rank	Name	Nation	Gap	Notes
1st place, gold medalist(s)	Joachim Eilers	Germany		
2nd place, silver medalist(s)	Eddie Dawkins	New Zealand	+0.002	
3rd place, bronze medalist(s)	Azizulhasni Awang	Malaysia	+0.068	
4	Maximilian Levy	Germany	+0.266	
5	Yuta Wakimoto	Japan	+0.565	
6	Jason Kenny	Great Britain	+2.750	
