= 2015 UCI Track Cycling World Championships – Men's scratch =

Men's scratch at the 2015 UCI Track Cycling World Championships
- Venue: Vélodrome de Saint-Quentin-en-Yvelines, Saint-Quentin-en-Yvelines
- Date: 19 February 2015
- Competitors: 20 from 20 nations

Medalists
gold medal	Lucas Liss	Germany
silver medal	Albert Torres	Spain
bronze medal	Bobby Lea	United States

The Men's scratch event of the 2015 UCI Track Cycling World Championships was held on 19 February 2015.

== Results ==
The race was started at 21:10.

Rank	Name	Nation	Laps down
1st place, gold medalist(s)	Lucas Liss	Germany	
2nd place, silver medalist(s)	Albert Torres	Spain	
3rd place, bronze medalist(s)	Bobby Lea	United States	
4	Roman Gladysh	Ukraine	
5	Cheung King Lok	Hong Kong	
6	Matthew Gibson	Great Britain	
7	Ivan Kovalev	Russia	
8	Morgan Kneisky	France	
9	Andreas Müller	Austria	
10	Martyn Irvine	Ireland	
11	Otto Vergaerde	Belgium	
12	Scott Law	Australia	
13	Hardzei Tsishchanka	Belarus	
14	Jiří Hochmann	Czech Republic	
15	Tim Veldt	Netherlands	
16	Adrian Tekliński	Poland	−1
17	Rui Oliveira	Portugal	−1
18	Cyrille Thièry	Switzerland	−1
19	Alex Buttazzoni	Italy	−1
	Regan Gough	New Zealand	DNF
