= 2015 UCI Track Cycling World Championships – Men's madison =

Men's madison at the 2015 UCI Track Cycling World Championships
- Venue: Vélodrome de Saint-Quentin-en-Yvelines, Saint-Quentin-en-Yvelines
- Date: 22 February 2015
- Competitors: 28 from 14 nations
- Winning points: 21

Medalists
gold medal	Bryan Coquard; Morgan Kneisky	France
silver medal	Marco Coledan; Elia Viviani	Italy
bronze medal	Jasper De Buyst; Otto Vergaerde	Belgium

The Men's madison event of the 2015 UCI Track Cycling World Championships was held on 22 February 2015.

== Results ==
The race consisted of 200 laps (50 km) with 10 sprints and was completed in 54:44.793, resulting in an average speed of 54.797 km/h, which is 34.493 mp/h.

Rank	Name	Nation	Points	Laps down
1st place, gold medalist(s)	Bryan Coquard; Morgan Kneisky	France	21	
2nd place, silver medalist(s)	Marco Coledan; Elia Viviani	Italy	20	
3rd place, bronze medalist(s)	Jasper De Buyst; Otto Vergaerde	Belgium	15	
4	David Muntaner; Albert Torres	Spain	15	
5	Henning Bommel; Theo Reinhardt	Germany	12	
6	Martin Bláha; Vojtěch Hačecký	Czech Republic	3	
7	Jack Bobridge; Glenn O'Shea	Australia	8	−1
8	Jonathan Dibben; Owain Doull	Great Britain	2	−1
9	Andreas Graf; Andreas Müller	Austria	2	−1
10	Juan Esteban Arango; Weimar Roldán	Colombia	5	−2
11	Roman Gladysh; Vladyslav Kreminskyi	Ukraine	4	−2
12	Théry Schir; Frank Pasche	Switzerland	2	−2
13	Cheung King Lok; Leung Chun Wing	Hong Kong	1	−2
	Pieter Bulling; Regan Gough	New Zealand	DNF	
