= 2015 UCI Track Cycling World Championships – Men's keirin =

Men's keirin at the 2015 UCI Track Cycling World Championships
- Venue: Vélodrome de Saint-Quentin-en-Yvelines, Saint-Quentin-en-Yvelines
- Date: 19 February 2015
- Competitors: 25 from 15 nations

Medalists
| gold medal | François Pervis | France |
| silver medal | Eddie Dawkins | New Zealand |
| bronze medal | Azizulhasni Awang | Malaysia |

The Men's keirin event of the 2015 UCI Track Cycling World Championships was held on 19 February 2015.

== Results ==
=== First round ===
The first round was held at 16:25.

==== Heat 1 ====
| Rank | Name | Nation | Gap | Notes |
|---|---|---|---|---|
| 1 | Maximilian Levy | Germany | | Q |
| 2 | Eddie Dawkins | New Zealand | | Q |
| 3 | Matthew Baranoski | United States | | |
| 4 | Kamil Kuczyński | Poland | | |
| 5 | Anderson Parra | Colombia | | |
| 6 | Michaël D'Almeida | France | | |

==== Heat 2 ====
| Rank | Name | Nation | Gap | Notes |
|---|---|---|---|---|
| 1 | Stefan Bötticher | Germany | | Q |
| 2 | Matthew Glaetzer | Australia | +0.029 | Q |
| 3 | Denis Dmitriev | Russia | +0.107 | |
| 4 | Fabián Puerta | Colombia | +0.125 | |
| 5 | Hugo Barrette | Canada | +0.228 | |
| 6 | Krzysztof Maksel | Poland | +0.079 | |

==== Heat 3 ====
| Rank | Name | Nation | Gap | Notes |
|---|---|---|---|---|
| 1 | Azizulhasni Awang | Malaysia | | Q |
| 2 | Matthijs Büchli | Netherlands | +0.153 | Q |
| 3 | Jacob Schmid | Australia | +0.159 | |
| 4 | Francesco Ceci | Italy | +0.205 | |
| 5 | Joachim Eilers | Germany | +0.301 | |
| 6 | Jason Kenny | Great Britain | +0.533 | |
| 7 | Kazunari Watanabe | Japan | +0.911 | |

==== Heat 4 ====
| Rank | Name | Nation | Gap | Notes |
|---|---|---|---|---|
| 1 | Sam Webster | New Zealand | | Q |
| 2 | François Pervis | France | +0.008 | Q |
| 3 | Shane Perkins | Australia | +0.088 | |
| 4 | Christos Volikakis | Greece | +0.148 | |
| 5 | Nikita Shurshin | Russia | +0.293 | |
| 6 | Josiah Ng | Malaysia | +0.784 | |

=== First round repechage ===
The first round repechage was held at 17:10.

==== Heat 1 ====
| Rank | Name | Nation | Gap | Notes |
|---|---|---|---|---|
| 1 | Krzysztof Maksel | Poland | | Q |
| 2 | Christos Volikakis | Greece | +0.108 | |
| 3 | Joachim Eilers | Germany | +0.182 | |
| | Matthew Baranoski | United States | REL | |

==== Heat 2 ====
| Rank | Name | Nation | Gap | Notes |
|---|---|---|---|---|
| 1 | Michaël D'Almeida | France | | Q |
| 2 | Denis Dmitriev | Russia | +0.084 | |
| 3 | Hugo Barrette | Canada | +0.141 | |
| 4 | Francesco Ceci | Italy | +0.781 | |

==== Heat 3 ====
| Rank | Name | Nation | Gap | Notes |
|---|---|---|---|---|
| 1 | Fabián Puerta | Colombia | | Q |
| 2 | Jacob Schmid | Australia | +0.010 | |
| 3 | Anderson Parra | Colombia | +0.548 | |
| 4 | Josiah Ng | Malaysia | +0.849 | |

==== Heat 4 ====
| Rank | Name | Nation | Gap | Notes |
|---|---|---|---|---|
| 1 | Nikita Shurshin | Russia | | Q |
| 2 | Jason Kenny | Great Britain | +0.125 | |
| 3 | Shane Perkins | Australia | +0.235 | |
| 4 | Kazunari Watanabe | Japan | +0.349 | |
| 5 | Kamil Kuczyński | Poland | +0.519 | |

=== Second round ===
The second round was started at 20:00.

==== Heat 1 ====
| Rank | Name | Nation | Gap | Notes |
|---|---|---|---|---|
| 1 | Nikita Shurshin | Russia | | Q |
| 2 | Maximilian Levy | Germany | +0.088 | Q |
| 3 | Sam Webster | New Zealand | +0.103 | Q |
| 4 | Matthijs Büchli | Netherlands | +0.149 | |
| 5 | Matthew Glaetzer | Australia | +0.259 | |
| 6 | Krzysztof Maksel | Poland | +0.339 | |

==== Heat 2 ====
| Rank | Name | Nation | Gap | Notes |
|---|---|---|---|---|
| 1 | Eddie Dawkins | New Zealand | | Q |
| 2 | François Pervis | France | +0.081 | Q |
| 3 | Azizulhasni Awang | Malaysia | +0.097 | Q |
| 4 | Stefan Bötticher | Germany | +0.112 | |
| 5 | Michaël D'Almeida | France | +0.116 | |
| 6 | Fabián Puerta | Colombia | +0.166 | |

=== Finals ===
The finals were started at 20:45.

==== Small final ====
| Rank | Name | Nation | Gap | Notes |
|---|---|---|---|---|
| 7 | Fabián Puerta | Colombia | | |
| 8 | Stefan Bötticher | Germany | +0.040 | |
| 9 | Matthijs Büchli | Netherlands | +0.093 | |
| 10 | Matthew Glaetzer | Australia | +0.343 | |
| 11 | Michaël D'Almeida | France | +0.407 | |
| 12 | Krzysztof Maksel | Poland | +0.494 | |

==== Final ====
| Rank | Name | Nation | Gap | Notes |
|---|---|---|---|---|
| 1st place, gold medalist(s) | François Pervis | France | | |
| 2nd place, silver medalist(s) | Eddie Dawkins | New Zealand | +0.085 | |
| 3rd place, bronze medalist(s) | Azizulhasni Awang | Malaysia | +0.229 | |
| 4 | Maximilian Levy | Germany | +0.274 | |
| 5 | Nikita Shurshin | Russia | +0.287 | |
| 6 | Sam Webster | New Zealand | +0.968 | |
