= 2015 UCI Track Cycling World Championships – Men's omnium =

Men's omnium at the 2015 UCI Track Cycling World Championships
- Venue: Vélodrome de Saint-Quentin-en-Yvelines, Saint-Quentin-en-Yvelines
- Date: 20–21 February 2015
- Competitors: 21 from 21 nations
- Winning points: 205

Medalists
gold medal	Fernando Gaviria	Colombia
silver medal	Glenn O'Shea	Australia
bronze medal	Elia Viviani	Italy

The Men's omnium event of the 2015 UCI Track Cycling World Championships was held on 20–21 February 2015.

== Results ==
=== Scratch race ===
The scratch race was held at 14:40.

Rank	Name	Nation	Laps down
1	Elia Viviani	Italy	
2	Jonathan Dibben	Great Britain	
3	Fernando Gaviria	Colombia	
4	Aaron Gate	New Zealand	
5	Jasper De Buyst	Belgium	
6	Raman Tsishkou	Belarus	
7	Gaël Suter	Switzerland	
8	Thomas Boudat	France	
9	Gideoni Monteiro	Brazil	
10	Casper Pedersen	Denmark	
11	Viktor Manakov	Russia	
12	Ioannis Spanopoulos	Greece	
13	Tim Veldt	Netherlands	
14	Lucas Liss	Germany	
15	Glenn O'Shea	Australia	
16	Liu Hao	China	
17	Unai Elorriaga	Spain	
18	Jacob Duehring	United States	
19	Leung Chun Wing	Hong Kong	
20	Martyn Irvine	Ireland	
21	Timur Gumerov	Uzbekistan	

=== Individual pursuit ===
The individual pursuit was held at 17:00.

Rank	Name	Nation	Time
1	Glenn O'Shea	Australia	4:20.807
2	Fernando Gaviria	Colombia	4:23.567
3	Viktor Manakov	Russia	4:24.025
4	Jasper De Buyst	Belgium	4:24.752
5	Gideoni Monteiro	Brazil	4:26.395
6	Thomas Boudat	France	4:26.553
7	Raman Tsishkou	Belarus	4:26.660
8	Lucas Liss	Germany	4:26.767
9	Martyn Irvine	Ireland	4:26.814
10	Elia Viviani	Italy	4:27.067
11	Aaron Gate	New Zealand	4:27.382
12	Liu Hao	China	4:28.011
13	Tim Veldt	Netherlands	4:28.071
14	Leung Chun Wing	Hong Kong	4:28.799
15	Jonathan Dibben	Great Britain	4:29.845
16	Unai Elorriaga	Spain	4:32.027
17	Gaël Suter	Switzerland	4:32.762
18	Ioannis Spanopoulos	Greece	4:34.189
19	Jacob Duehring	United States	4:34.792
20	Casper Pedersen	Denmark	4:35.446
21	Timur Gumerov	Uzbekistan	4:42.373

=== Elimination race ===
The elimination race was started at 22:15.

Rank	Name	Nation
1	Elia Viviani	Italy
2	Thomas Boudat	France
3	Fernando Gaviria	Colombia
4	Glenn O'Shea	Australia
5	Viktor Manakov	Russia
6	Liu Hao	China
7	Jasper De Buyst	Belgium
8	Casper Pedersen	Denmark
9	Aaron Gate	New Zealand
10	Gideoni Monteiro	Brazil
11	Lucas Liss	Germany
12	Gaël Suter	Switzerland
13	Tim Veldt	Netherlands
14	Jacob Duehring	United States
15	Martyn Irvine	Ireland
16	Raman Tsishkou	Belarus
17	Jonathan Dibben	Great Britain
18	Unai Elorriaga	Spain
19	Leung Chun Wing	Hong Kong
20	Timur Gumerov	Uzbekistan
21	Ioannis Spanopoulos	Greece

=== 1 km time trial ===
The individual pursuit was held at 14:45.

Rank	Name	Nation	Time
1	Lucas Liss	Germany	1:01.508
2	Glenn O'Shea	Australia	1:02.300
3	Tim Veldt	Netherlands	1:02.318
4	Fernando Gaviria	Colombia	1:02.591
5	Gaël Suter	Switzerland	1:02.897
6	Leung Chun Wing	Hong Kong	1:03.461
7	Thomas Boudat	France	1:03.631
8	Liu Hao	China	1:03.729
9	Jasper De Buyst	Belgium	1:03.895
10	Elia Viviani	Italy	1:04.129
11	Viktor Manakov	Russia	1:04.397
12	Raman Tsishkou	Belarus	1:04.421
13	Ioannis Spanopoulos	Greece	1:04.556
14	Martyn Irvine	Ireland	1:04.639
15	Jonathan Dibben	Great Britain	1:04.724
16	Casper Pedersen	Denmark	1:05.057
17	Gideoni Monteiro	Brazil	1:05.141
18	Jacob Duehring	United States	1:05.754
19	Unai Elorriaga	Spain	1:06.134
20	Aaron Gate	New Zealand	1:06.297
21	Timur Gumerov	Uzbekistan	1:06.697

=== Flying lap ===
The flying lap was started at 16:40.

Rank	Name	Nation	Time
1	Elia Viviani	Italy	12.785
2	Tim Veldt	Netherlands	12.863
3	Gaël Suter	Switzerland	12.922
4	Glenn O'Shea	Australia	12.926
5	Lucas Liss	Germany	12.986
6	Liu Hao	China	13.062
7	Viktor Manakov	Russia	13.131
8	Fernando Gaviria	Colombia	13.137
9	Casper Pedersen	Denmark	13.174
10	Jasper De Buyst	Belgium	13.202
11	Raman Tsishkou	Belarus	13.269
12	Leung Chun Wing	Hong Kong	13.272
13	Thomas Boudat	France	13.276
14	Ioannis Spanopoulos	Greece	13.288
15	Aaron Gate	New Zealand	13.359
16	Jacob Duehring	United States	13.438
17	Jonathan Dibben	Great Britain	13.445
18	Martyn Irvine	Ireland	13.453
19	Gideoni Monteiro	Brazil	13.469
20	Unai Elorriaga	Spain	13.546
21	Timur Gumerov	Uzbekistan	14.113

=== Points race ===
The points race was started at 19:55.

Rank	Name	Nation
1	Jasper De Buyst	Belgium
2	Viktor Manakov	Russia
3	Aaron Gate	New Zealand
4	Elia Viviani	Italy
5	Lucas Liss	Germany
6	Ioannis Spanopoulos	Greece
7	Raman Tsishkou	Belarus
8	Martyn Irvine	Ireland
9	Fernando Gaviria	Colombia
10	Jacob Duehring	United States
11	Tim Veldt	Netherlands
12	Gideoni Monteiro	Brazil
13	Leung Chun Wing	Hong Kong
14	Glenn O'Shea	Australia
15	Casper Pedersen	Denmark
16	Jonathan Dibben	Great Britain
17	Thomas Boudat	France
18	Liu Hao	China
19	Timur Gumerov	Uzbekistan
20	Gaël Suter	Switzerland
21	Unai Elorriaga	Spain

=== Final standings ===
After all events.

Rank	Name	Nation	Points
1st place, gold medalist(s)	Fernando Gaviria	Colombia	205
2nd place, silver medalist(s)	Glenn O'Shea	Australia	190
3rd place, bronze medalist(s)	Elia Viviani	Italy	181
4	Jasper De Buyst	Belgium	178
5	Aaron Gate	New Zealand	173
6	Raman Tsishkou	Belarus	159
7	Gaël Suter	Switzerland	149
8	Thomas Boudat	France	144
9	Viktor Manakov	Russia	141
10	Tim Veldt	Netherlands	139
11	Lucas Liss	Germany	134
12	Jonathan Dibben	Great Britain	123
13	Casper Pedersen	Denmark	117
14	Liu Hao	China	115
15	Gideoni Monteiro	Brazil	112
16	Leung Chun Wing	Hong Kong	76
17	Martyn Irvine	Ireland	70
18	Jacob Duehring	United States	71
19	Ioannis Spanopoulos	Greece	55
20	Unai Elorriaga	Spain	52
21	Timur Gumerov	Uzbekistan	−13
