= 2015 UCI Track Cycling World Championships – Men's points race =

Men's points race at the 2015 UCI Track Cycling World Championships
- Venue: Vélodrome de Saint-Quentin-en-Yvelines, Saint-Quentin-en-Yvelines
- Date: 20 February 2015
- Competitors: 20 from 20 nations
- Winning points: 31

Medalists
| gold medal | Artur Ershov | Russia |
| silver medal | Eloy Teruel | Spain |
| bronze medal | Maximilian Beyer | Germany |

The Men's points race event of the 2015 UCI Track Cycling World Championships was held on 20 February 2015.

== Results ==
The race was started at 20:15.

160 laps (40 km) were raced with 12 sprints.

| Rank | Name | Nation | Sprint points | Lap points | Total points |
|---|---|---|---|---|---|
| 1st place, gold medalist(s) | Artur Ershov | Russia | 11 | 20 | 31 |
| 2nd place, silver medalist(s) | Eloy Teruel | Spain | 10 | 20 | 30 |
| 3rd place, bronze medalist(s) | Maximilian Beyer | Germany | 9 | 20 | 29 |
| 4 | Regan Gough | New Zealand | 9 | 20 | 29 |
| 5 | Cheung King Lok | Hong Kong | 7 | 20 | 27 |
| 6 | Liam Bertazzo | Italy | 24 | 0 | 24 |
| 7 | Scott Law | Australia | 18 | 0 | 18 |
| 8 | Raman Ramanau | Belarus | 16 | 0 | 16 |
| 9 | Benjamin Thomas | France | 16 | 0 | 16 |
| 10 | Nicholas Rogers | United States | 12 | 0 | 12 |
| 11 | Kazushige Kuboki | Japan | 10 | 0 | 10 |
| 12 | Moreno De Pauw | Belgium | 10 | 0 | 10 |
| 13 | Vojtěch Hačecký | Czech Republic | 6 | 0 | 6 |
| 14 | Wojciech Pszczolarski | Poland | 5 | 0 | 5 |
| 15 | Wim Stroetinga | Netherlands | 5 | 0 | 5 |
| 16 | Edwin Ávila | Colombia | 4 | 0 | 4 |
| 17 | Mark Christian | Great Britain | 3 | 0 | 3 |
| 18 | Andreas Graf | Austria | 0 | 0 | 0 |
| 19 | Vitaliy Hryniv | Ukraine | 0 | 0 | 0 |
| | Cyrille Thièry | Switzerland | DNF | | |
