= 2016 UCI Track Cycling World Championships – Men's individual pursuit =

Men's individual pursuit at the 2016 UCI Track Cycling World Championships
- Venue: Lee Valley VeloPark
- Location: London, United Kingdom
- Date: 4 March
- Competitors: 16 from 13 nations
- Winning time: 4:16.141

Medalists
gold medal	Filippo Ganna	Italy
silver medal	Domenic Weinstein	Germany
bronze medal	Andy Tennant	Great Britain

The Men's individual pursuit event of the 2016 UCI Track Cycling World Championships was held on 4 March 2016. Filippo Ganna of Italy won the gold medal.

== Results ==
=== Qualifying ===
The qualifying was held at 10:47.

Rank	Name	Nation	Time	Behind	Notes
1	Filippo Ganna	Italy	4:16.127		Q
2	Domenic Weinstein	Germany	4:16.206	+0.079	Q
3	Owain Doull	Great Britain	4:17.698	+1.571	q
4	Andy Tennant	Great Britain	4:18.944	+2.817	q
5	Mikhail Shemetau	Belarus	4:19.017	+2.890	
6	Kirill Sveshnikov	Russia	4:19.815	+3.688	
7	Dylan Kennett	New Zealand	4:19.992	+3.865	
8	Michael Hepburn	Australia	4:21.865	+5.738	
9	Dion Beukeboom	Netherlands	4:24.574	+8.447	
10	Thomas Denis	France	4:25.208	+9.081	
11	Jonathan Dufrasne	Belgium	4:26.016	+9.889	
12	Silvan Dillier	Switzerland	4:26.538	+10.411	
13	Dmitri Sokolov	Russia	4:28.355	+12.228	
14	Rémi Pelletier-Roy	Canada	4:28.510	+12.383	
15	Frank Pasche	Switzerland	4:28.582	+12.455	
16	Vicente García de Mateos	Spain	4:29.483	+13.356	

=== Finals ===
The finals were started at 19:40.

Rank	Name	Nation	Time	Behind
Gold Medal Race
1st place, gold medalist(s)	Filippo Ganna	Italy	4:16.141	
2nd place, silver medalist(s)	Domenic Weinstein	Germany	4:18.275	+2.134
Bronze Medal Race
3rd place, bronze medalist(s)	Andy Tennant	Great Britain	4:18.301	
4	Owain Doull	Great Britain	4:18.476	+0.175
