= 2015 UCI Track Cycling World Championships – Women's scratch =

Women's scratch at the 2015 UCI Track Cycling World Championships
- Venue: Vélodrome de Saint-Quentin-en-Yvelines, Saint-Quentin-en-Yvelines
- Date: 21 February 2015
- Competitors: 24 from 24 nations

Medalists
gold medal	Kirsten Wild	Netherlands
silver medal	Amy Cure	Australia
bronze medal	Allison Beveridge	Canada

The Women's scratch event of the 2015 UCI Track Cycling World Championships was held on 21 February 2015.

== Results ==
The race was started at 19:10.

Rank	Name	Nation	Laps down
1st place, gold medalist(s)	Kirsten Wild	Netherlands	
2nd place, silver medalist(s)	Amy Cure	Australia	
3rd place, bronze medalist(s)	Allison Beveridge	Canada	
4	Lizbeth Salazar	Mexico	
5	Alžbeta Pavlendová	Slovakia	
6	Annalisa Cucinotta	Italy	
7	Kelly Druyts	Belgium	
8	Kimberly Geist	United States	
9	Milena Salcedo	Colombia	
10	Gudrun Stock	Germany	
11	Tetyana Klimchenko	Ukraine	
12	Rushlee Buchanan	New Zealand	
13	Evgenia Romanyuta	Russia	
14	Yang Qianyu	Hong Kong	
15	Jarmila Machačová	Czech Republic	
16	Katarzyna Pawłowska	Poland	
17	Elinor Barker	Great Britain	
18	Sara Ferrara	Finland	
19	Caroline Ryan	Ireland	
20	Maroesjka Matthee	South Africa	
21	Marina Shmayankova	Belarus	
	Pascale Jeuland	France	REL
	Yumari González	Cuba	DNF
	Sheyla Gutiérrez	Spain	DNF
