= 2015 UCI Track Cycling World Championships – Women's sprint =

Women's sprint at the 2015 UCI Track Cycling World Championships
- Venue: Vélodrome de Saint-Quentin-en-Yvelines, Saint-Quentin-en-Yvelines
- Date: 20–21 February 2015
- Competitors: 30 from 18 nations

Medalists
gold medal	Kristina Vogel	Germany
silver medal	Elis Ligtlee	Netherlands
bronze medal	Zhong Tianshi	China

The Women's sprint event of the 2015 UCI Track Cycling World Championships was held on 20–21 February 2015.

== Results ==
=== Qualifying ===
The qualifying was held at 14:00.

Rank	Name	Nation	Time	Notes
1	Zhong Tianshi	China	10.627	Q
2	Elis Ligtlee	Netherlands	10.732	Q
3	Stephanie Morton	Australia	10.754	Q
4	Kristina Vogel	Germany	10.770	Q
5	Guo Shuang	China	10.784	Q
6	Jessica Varnish	Great Britain	10.804	Q
7	Anna Meares	Australia	10.849	Q
8	Anastasiia Voinova	Russia	10.870	Q
9	Simona Krupeckaitė	Lithuania	10.902	Q
10	Lee Wai Sze	Hong Kong	10.932	Q
11	Victoria Williamson	Great Britain	10.935	Q
12	Virginie Cueff	France	10.960	Q
13	Tania Calvo	Spain	11.004	Q
14	Monique Sullivan	Canada	11.016	Q
15	Miriam Welte	Germany	11.034	Q
16	Olga Hudenko	Russia	11.066	Q
17	Fatehah Mustapa	Malaysia	11.108	Q
18	Lisandra Guerra	Cuba	11.121	Q
19	Victoria Tyumneva	Russia	11.146	Q
20	Stephanie McKenzie	New Zealand	11.155	Q
21	Luz Gaxiola	Mexico	11.200	Q
22	Helena Casas	Spain	11.249	Q
23	Sandie Clair	France	11.253	Q
24	Yesna Rijkhoff	Netherlands	11.266	Q
25	Diana García	Colombia	11.286	
26	Juliana Gaviria	Colombia	11.307	
27	Melissa Erickson	United States	11.326	
28	Kayono Maeda	Japan	11.406	
29	Gintarė Gaivenytė	Lithuania	11.508	
30	Takako Ishii	Japan	11.590	

=== 1/16 finals ===
The 1/16 finals were held at 15:05.

Heat	Rank	Name	Nation	Gap	Notes
1	1	Zhong Tianshi	China		Q
1	2	Yesna Rijkhoff	Netherlands	+0.054	
2	1	Elis Ligtlee	Netherlands		Q
2	2	Sandie Clair	France	+0.347	
3	1	Stephanie Morton	Australia		Q
3	2	Helena Casas	Spain	+0.108	
4	1	Kristina Vogel	Germany		Q
4	2	Luz Gaxiola	Mexico	+0.148	
5	1	Guo Shuang	China		Q
5	2	Stephanie McKenzie	New Zealand	+0.121	
6	1	Jessica Varnish	Great Britain		Q
6	2	Victoria Tyumneva	Russia	+0.079	
7	1	Anna Meares	Australia		Q
7	2	Lisandra Guerra	Cuba	+0.100	
8	1	Anastasiia Voinova	Russia		Q
8	2	Fatehah Mustapa	Malaysia	+0.268	
9	1	Simona Krupeckaitė	Lithuania		Q
9	2	Olga Hudenko	Russia	+0.057	
10	1	Miriam Welte	Germany		Q
10	2	Lee Wai Sze	Hong Kong	+0.031	
11	1	Victoria Williamson	Great Britain		Q
11	2	Monique Sullivan	Canada	+0.006	
12	1	Tania Calvo	Spain		Q
12	2	Virginie Cueff	France	+0.024	

=== 1/8 finals ===
The 1/8 finals were held at 16:40.

Heat	Rank	Name	Nation	Gap	Notes
1	1	Zhong Tianshi	China		Q
1	2	Tania Calvo	Spain	+0.207	
2	1	Elis Ligtlee	Netherlands		Q
2	2	Victoria Williamson	Great Britain	+0.077	
3	1	Stephanie Morton	Australia		Q
3	2	Miriam Welte	Germany	+0.347	
4	1	Kristina Vogel	Germany		Q
4	2	Simona Krupeckaitė	Lithuania	+0.082	
5	1	Anastasiia Voinova	Russia		Q
5	2	Guo Shuang	China	REL	
6	1	Jessica Varnish	Great Britain		Q
6	2	Anna Meares	Australia	+0.062	

=== 1/8 finals repechage ===
1/8 finals repechage was held at 18:10.

Heat	Rank	Name	Nation	Gap	Notes
1	1	Simona Krupeckaitė	Lithuania		Q
1	2	Anna Meares	Australia	+0.013	
1	3	Tania Calvo	Spain	+0.190	
2	1	Guo Shuang	China		Q
2	2	Miriam Welte	Germany	+0.422	
2	3	Victoria Williamson	Great Britain	+0.430	

=== Quarterfinals ===
Race 1 was started at 20:00, Race at 21:05.

Heat	Rank	Name	Nation	Race 1	Race 2	Decider	Notes
1	1	Zhong Tianshi	China	X	X		Q
1	2	Guo Shuang	China	+0.270	+0.208		
2	1	Elis Ligtlee	Netherlands	X	X		Q
2	2	Simona Krupeckaitė	Lithuania	+0.083	+0.083		
3	1	Stephanie Morton	Australia	X	X		Q
3	2	Jessica Varnish	Great Britain	+0.004	+0.158		
4	1	Kristina Vogel	Germany	X	X		Q
4	2	Anastasiia Voinova	Russia	+0.008	+0.009		

=== Race for 5th–8th places ===
The race for 5th–8th places was held at 22:00.

Rank	Name	Nation	Gap
5	Guo Shuang	China	
6	Anastasiia Voinova	Russia	+0.001
7	Simona Krupeckaitė	Lithuania	+0.019
8	Jessica Varnish	Great Britain	+0.337

=== Semifinals ===
Race 1 was held at 19:00, Race 2 at 19:30 and Race 3 at 19:50.

Heat	Rank	Name	Nation	Race 1	Race 2	Decider	Notes
1	1	Kristina Vogel	Germany	+0.014	X	X	Q
1	2	Zhong Tianshi	China	X	+0.010	+0.088	
2	1	Elis Ligtlee	Netherlands	X	X		Q
2	2	Stephanie Morton	Australia	+0.028	+0.180		

=== Finals ===
Race 1 was held at 20:45 and Race 2 at 21:20.

Rank	Name	Nation	Race 1	Race 2	Decider
Gold Medal Races
1st place, gold medalist(s)	Kristina Vogel	Germany	X	X	
2nd place, silver medalist(s)	Elis Ligtlee	Netherlands	+0.001	+0.152	
Bronze Medal Races
3rd place, bronze medalist(s)	Zhong Tianshi	China	X	X	
4	Stephanie Morton	Australia	+0.137	+0.037	
