= United States at the UCI Track Cycling World Championships =

United States at the 2015 UCI Track Cycling World Championships
- IOC code: USA

in Saint-Quentin-en-Yvelines, France 18 February – 22 February 2015
- Competitors: 14
- Medals Ranked 12th: Gold 0 Silver 1 Bronze 2 Total 3

UCI Track Cycling World Championships appearances (overview)
- Overview page Recent: 2009; 2010; 2011; 2012; 2013; 2014; 2015; 2016; 2017; 2018; 2019; 2020; 2021; 2022; 2023; 2024; 2025; 2026

United States competed at the 2015 UCI Track Cycling World Championships in Saint-Quentin-en-Yvelines at the Vélodrome de Saint-Quentin-en-Yvelines from 18 to 22 February 2015. A team of 14 cyclists (9 women, 5 men) was announced to represent the country in the event.

== Results ==
=== Men ===
Name	Event	Result	Rank
Bobby Lea	Men's individual pursuit	4:27.477	13
Bobby Lea	Men's scratch	—N/a	3rd place, bronze medalist(s)
Nicholas Rogers	Men's points race	12 points	10
Jacob Duehring	Men's omnium	71 points	18
Matthew Baranoski	Men's keirin		21

=== Women ===
Name	Event	Result	Rank
Melissa Erickson	Women's sprint	11.326	27
Melissa Erickson	Women's keirin		13
Jennifer Valente	Women's individual pursuit	3:29.547 (Q), 3:33.867	2nd place, silver medalist(s)
Kimberly Geist	Women's points race	25 points	
Sarah Hammer	Women's omnium	126 points	8
Kimberly Geist	Women's scratch	—N/a	8
Sarah Hammer; Jennifer Valente; Lauren Tamayo; Ruth Winder	Women's team pursuit	4:28.302 (q),	6

== 2016 UCI Track Cycling World Championships ==
United States at the 2016 UCI Track Cycling World Championships
- IOC code: USA

in London, United Kingdom 2 March – 6 March 2016
- Competitors: 14 (6 men, 8 women)
- Medals: Gold 0 Silver 0 Bronze 0 Total 0

UCI Track Cycling World Championships appearances (overview)
- Recent: 2009; 2010; 2011; 2012; 2013; 2014; 2015; 2016; 2017; 2018; 2019; 2020; 2021; 2022; 2023; 2024; 2025; 2026

United States competed at the 2016 UCI Track Cycling World Championships at the Lee Valley VeloPark in London, United Kingdom from 2–4 March 2016. A team of 14 cyclists (8 women, 6 men) was announced to represent the country in the event.

== Results ==
=== Men ===
Name	Event	Result	Rank
Matthew Baranoski	Men's keirin	—N/a	23
Jacob Duehring	Men's scratch	—N/a	17
Ian Holt	Men's points race	2 points	11

=== Women ===
Name	Event	Result	Rank
Ruth Winder	Women's individual pursuit	03:37.016 (q), 03:39.902 (f)	4
Kimberly Geist	Women's scratch	—N/a	17
Kimberly Geist	Women's points race	6 points	7
Sarah Hammer	Women's omnium	182 points	3
Sarah Hammer; Kelly Catlin; Chloé Dygert; Jennifer Valente	Women's team pursuit	04:16.180 (q), 04:16.802 (f)	1
