= Timur Gumerov =

Uzbekistani cyclist (born 1992)

Personal information
- Born: 26 March 1992 (age 34)

Cycling career
- Sport: Cycling
- Disciplines: Track; Road
- Role: Rider
- Rider type: Endurance (track)

Timur Gumerov (born 26 March 1992) is an Uzbekistani road and track cyclist. In 2015, Gumerov competed in the omnium event at the UCI Track Cycling World Championships, finished third at the Uzbekistan National Time Trial Championships, and won the gold medal in the omnium at the Asian Cycling Championships.
