= 2015 UCI Track Cycling World Championships – Women's omnium =

Women's omnium at the 2015 UCI Track Cycling World Championships
- Venue: Vélodrome de Saint-Quentin-en-Yvelines, Saint-Quentin-en-Yvelines
- Date: 21–22 February 2015
- Competitors: 20 from 20 nations
- Winning points: 192

Medalists
gold medal	Annette Edmondson	Australia
silver medal	Laura Trott	Great Britain
bronze medal	Kirsten Wild	Netherlands

The Women's omnium event of the 2015 UCI Track Cycling World Championships was held on 21–22 February 2015.

== Results ==
=== Scratch race ===
The scratch race was started 13:45.

Rank	Name	Nation	Laps down
1	Aušrinė Trebaitė	Lithuania	
2	Amalie Dideriksen	Denmark	
3	Caroline Ryan	Ireland	
4	Tatsiana Sharakova	Belarus	
5	Annette Edmondson	Australia	−1
6	Jolien D'Hoore	Belgium	−1
7	Kirsten Wild	Netherlands	−1
8	Sarah Hammer	United States	−1
9	Marlies Mejías	Cuba	−1
10	Leire Olaberria	Spain	−1
11	Anna Knauer	Germany	−1
12	Racquel Sheath	New Zealand	−1
13	Laura Trott	Great Britain	−1
14	Lucie Záleská	Czech Republic	−1
15	Laurie Berthon	France	−1
16	Tian Yuanyuan	China	−1
17	Simona Frapporti	Italy	−1
18	Diao Xiaojuan	Hong Kong	−1
19	Tamara Balabolina	Russia	−1
20	Małgorzata Wojtyra	Poland	−1

=== Individual pursuit ===
The individual pursuit was started 15:35.

Rank	Name	Nation	Time
1	Laura Trott	Great Britain	3:32.798
2	Annette Edmondson	Australia	3:32.831
3	Kirsten Wild	Netherlands	3:34.858
4	Sarah Hammer	United States	3:35.505
5	Tatsiana Sharakova	Belarus	3:35.510
6	Tamara Balabolina	Russia	3:37.328
7	Marlies Mejías	Cuba	3:38.204
8	Jolien D'Hoore	Belgium	3:38.812
9	Leire Olaberria	Spain	3:39.903
10	Caroline Ryan	Ireland	3:40.559
11	Amalie Dideriksen	Denmark	3:40.930
12	Racquel Sheath	New Zealand	3:41.582
13	Simona Frapporti	Italy	3:42.208
14	Lucie Záleská	Czech Republic	3:42.794
15	Aušrinė Trebaitė	Lithuania	3:43.393
16	Anna Knauer	Germany	3:45.215
17	Małgorzata Wojtyra	Poland	3:46.992
18	Laurie Berthon	France	3:49.451
19	Diao Xiaojuan	Hong Kong	3:49.924
20	Tian Yuanyuan	China	3:50.557

=== Elimination race ===
The elimination race was started 21:55.

Rank	Name	Nation
1	Laura Trott	Great Britain
2	Kirsten Wild	Netherlands
3	Jolien D'Hoore	Belgium
4	Racquel Sheath	New Zealand
5	Amalie Dideriksen	Denmark
6	Tamara Balabolina	Russia
7	Annette Edmondson	Australia
8	Leire Olaberria	Spain
9	Lucie Záleská	Czech Republic
10	Sarah Hammer	United States
11	Simona Frapporti	Italy
12	Tian Yuanyuan	China
13	Anna Knauer	Germany
14	Laurie Berthon	France
15	Tatsiana Sharakova	Belarus
16	Caroline Ryan	Ireland
17	Marlies Mejías	Cuba
18	Małgorzata Wojtyra	Poland
19	Aušrinė Trebaitė	Lithuania
20	Diao Xiaojuan	Hong Kong

=== 500 m time trial ===
The 500 m time trial was started at 11:00.

Rank	Name	Nation	Time
1	Annette Edmondson	Australia	35.064
2	Marlies Mejías	Cuba	35.103
3	Tamara Balabolina	Russia	35.650
4	Jolien D'Hoore	Belgium	35.675
5	Laura Trott	Great Britain	35.814
6	Laurie Berthon	France	36.023
7	Anna Knauer	Germany	36.039
8	Leire Olaberria	Spain	36.101
9	Małgorzata Wojtyra	Poland	36.181
10	Tatsiana Sharakova	Belarus	36.440
11	Tian Yuanyuan	China	36.621
12	Simona Frapporti	Italy	36.720
13	Kirsten Wild	Netherlands	37.019
14	Racquel Sheath	New Zealand	37.029
15	Aušrinė Trebaitė	Lithuania	37.061
16	Diao Xiaojuan	Hong Kong	37.183
17	Sarah Hammer	United States	37.186
18	Lucie Záleská	Czech Republic	37.474
19	Amalie Dideriksen	Denmark	37.709
20	Caroline Ryan	Ireland	37.977

=== Flying lap ===
The flying lap was started at 12:40.

Rank	Name	Nation	Time
1	Annette Edmondson	Australia	14.024
2	Kirsten Wild	Netherlands	14.116
3	Laura Trott	Great Britain	14.154
4	Jolien D'Hoore	Belgium	14.229
5	Anna Knauer	Germany	14.230
6	Marlies Mejías	Cuba	14.258
7	Diao Xiaojuan	Hong Kong	14.266
8	Leire Olaberria	Spain	14.310
9	Laurie Berthon	France	14.339
10	Tatsiana Sharakova	Belarus	14.400
11	Tamara Balabolina	Russia	14.421
12	Małgorzata Wojtyra	Poland	14.453
13	Simona Frapporti	Italy	14.504
14	Sarah Hammer	United States	14.522
15	Racquel Sheath	New Zealand	14.550
16	Amalie Dideriksen	Denmark	14.664
17	Tian Yuanyuan	China	14.859
18	Lucie Záleská	Czech Republic	14.962
19	Caroline Ryan	Ireland	15.264
20	Aušrinė Trebaitė	Lithuania	15.282

=== Points race ===
The points race was held at 14:10.

Rank	Name	Nation
1	Kirsten Wild	Netherlands
2	Laura Trott	Great Britain
3	Jolien D'Hoore	Belgium
4	Annette Edmondson	Australia
5	Tian Yuanyuan	China
6	Sarah Hammer	United States
7	Tamara Balabolina	Russia
8	Racquel Sheath	New Zealand
9	Anna Knauer	Germany
10	Diao Xiaojuan	Hong Kong
11	Amalie Dideriksen	Denmark
12	Laurie Berthon	France
13	Tatsiana Sharakova	Belarus
14	Aušrinė Trebaitė	Lithuania
15	Leire Olaberria	Spain
16	Simona Frapporti	Italy
17	Caroline Ryan	Ireland
18	Małgorzata Wojtyra	Poland
19	Lucie Záleská	Czech Republic
20	Marlies Mejías	Cuba

=== Final standings ===
After all events.

Rank	Name	Nation	Points
1st place, gold medalist(s)	Annette Edmondson	Australia	192
2nd place, silver medalist(s)	Laura Trott	Great Britain	176
3rd place, bronze medalist(s)	Kirsten Wild	Netherlands	175
4	Jolien D'Hoore	Belgium	166
5	Marlies Mejías	Cuba	149
6	Tatsiana Sharakova	Belarus	131
7	Leire Olaberria	Spain	129
8	Sarah Hammer	United States	126
9	Tamara Balabolina	Russia	120
10	Racquel Sheath	New Zealand	117
11	Anna Knauer	Germany	112
12	Amalie Dideriksen	Denmark	108
13	Simona Frapporti	Italy	98
14	Laurie Berthon	France	87
15	Caroline Ryan	Ireland	84
16	Aušrinė Trebaitė	Lithuania	75
17	Tian Yuanyuan	China	68
18	Lucie Záleská	Czech Republic	64
19	Małgorzata Wojtyra	Poland	58
20	Diao Xiaojuan	Hong Kong	55
