= Laurie Berthon =

French cyclist

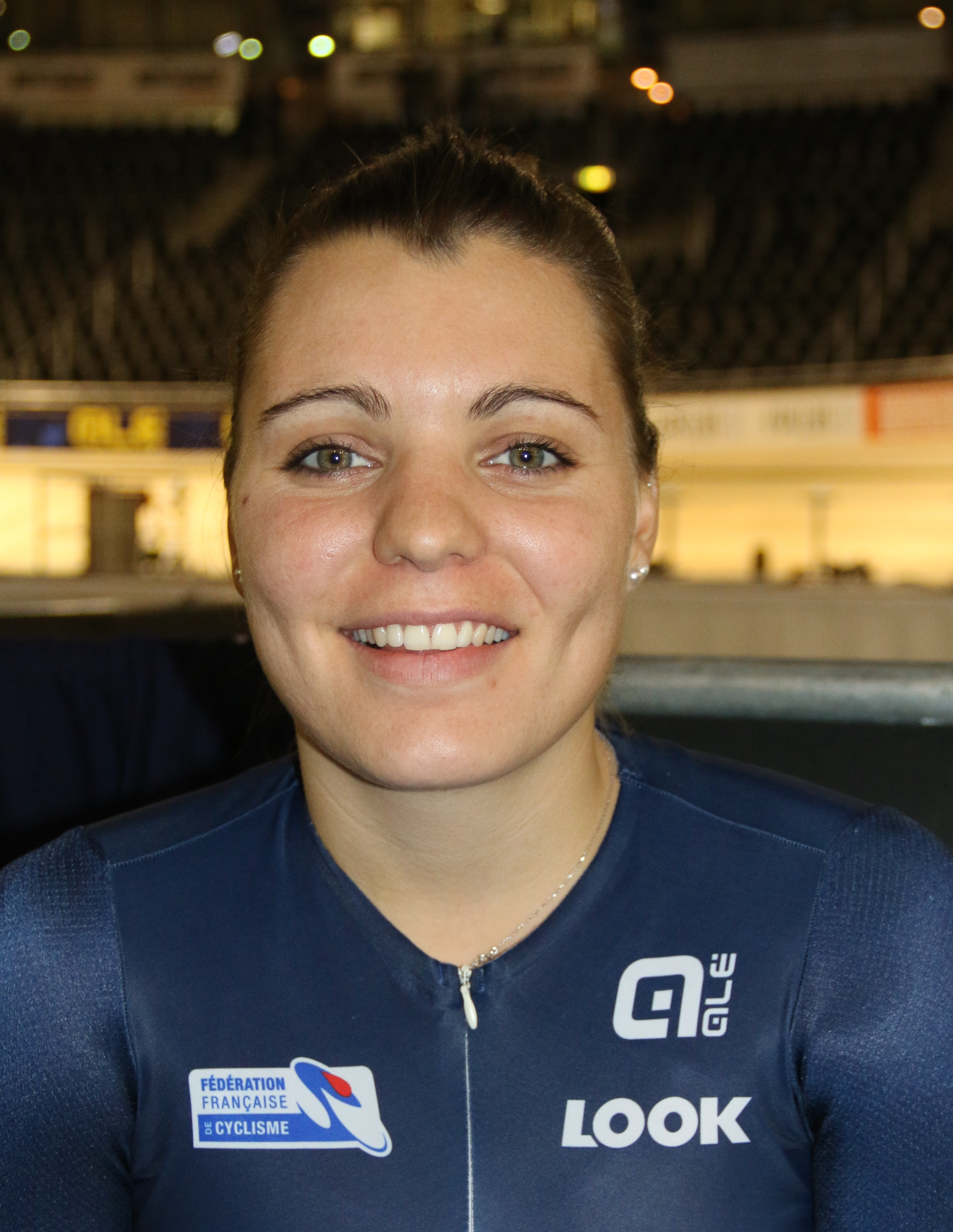
- Laurie Berthon (2017)

Personal information
- Full name: Laurie Berthon
- Born: 26 August 1991 (age 35) Lyon, France
- Height: 1.69 m (5 ft 7 in)
- Weight: 69 kg (152 lb)

Cycling career
- Sport: Cycling
- Discipline: Track cycling

Professional team
- 2013: Bourgogne-Pro Dialog
Medal record
Women's track cycling
Representing France
World Championships
Silver medal – second place	2016 London	Omnium
European Championships
Bronze medal – third place	2016 Yvelines	Elimination race

Laurie Berthon (born 26 August 1991) is a French track cyclist. She represented her nation in four editions of the UCI Track Cycling World Championships (from 2013 to 2016).

Berthon competed for France in the women's omnium at the 2016 Summer Olympics in Rio de Janeiro. There, she collected a total score of 163 points to wrap up the six-race series of the competition in tenth position.

She announced her retirement from the sport in July 2019.

== Major results ==
2008
Grand Prix International Ville de Barcelone

2nd Keirin
2nd 500m Time Trial
3rd Scratch Race

2012
UEC European U23 Track Championships

2nd Omnium
2nd Scratch Race

2013
UEC European U23 Track Championships

2nd Omnium
2nd Scratch Race

3rd Omnium, Los Angeles Grand Prix
2014
1st Omnium, South East Asian GP Track (1)
1st Points Race, South East Asian GP Track (2)
1st Omnium, South East Asian GP Track (3)
1st Scratch Race, Fenioux Trophy Piste
1st Scratch Race, International Track Women & Men
1st Scratch Race, Track-Cycling Challenge Grenchen
Fenioux - 80 ans du Vélodrome de Lyon

1st Scratch Race
1st Sprint

1st Omnium, Open des Nations sur Piste de Roubaix
2nd Scratch Race, UEC European Track Championships
2nd Scratch Race, Revolution – Round 2, Manchester
2015
1st Omnium, Fenioux Piste International
1st Omnium, Open des Nations sur Piste de Roubaix
1st Omnium, Prova Internacional de Anadia
2nd Points Race, Revolution - Round 4, Glasgow
3rd Points Race, 6 giorni delle rose - Fiorenzuola
2016
Trofeu CAR Anadia Portugal

1st Scratch Race
3rd Individual Pursuit
3rd Points Race
3rd Sprint
3rd 500m Time Trial

2nd Omnium, UCI Track Cycling World Championships
Prova Internacional de Anadia

2nd Omnium
3rd Scratch race

3rd Elimination race, UEC European Track Championships
Fenioux Piste International

3rd Omnium
3rd Sprint
