= 2015 UCI Track Cycling World Championships – Women's individual pursuit =

Women's individual pursuit at the 2015 UCI Track Cycling World Championships
- Venue: Vélodrome de Saint-Quentin-en-Yvelines, Saint-Quentin-en-Yvelines
- Date: 20 February 2015
- Competitors: 21 from 17 nations
- Winning time: 3:30.305

Medalists
gold medal	Rebecca Wiasak	Australia
silver medal	Jennifer Valente	United States
bronze medal	Amy Cure	Australia

The Women's individual pursuit event of the 2015 UCI Track Cycling World Championships was held on 20 February 2015.

== Results ==
=== Qualifying ===
The qualifying was held at 15:35.

Rank	Name	Nation	Time	Notes
1	Rebecca Wiasak	Australia	3:27.018	Q
2	Jennifer Valente	United States	3:29.547	Q
3	Amy Cure	Australia	3:29.794	q
4	Joanna Rowsell	Great Britain	3:31.171	q
5	Katie Archibald	Great Britain	3:31.276	
6	Jasmin Glaesser	Canada	3:34.827	
7	Jaime Nielsen	New Zealand	3:34.938	
8	Marlies Mejías	Cuba	3:35.570	
9	Élise Delzenne	France	3:36.730	
10	Mieke Kröger	Germany	3:38.522	
11	Georgia Williams	New Zealand	3:38.731	
12	María Luisa Calle	Colombia	3:39.592	
13	Eugenia Bujak	Poland	3:39.636	
14	Lotte Kopecky	Belgium	3:41.044	
15	Edita Mazurevičiūtė	Lithuania	3:42.610	
16	Edyta Jasińska	Poland	3:44.505	
17	Silvia Valsecchi	Italy	3:45.324	
18	Gloria Rodríguez	Spain	3:45.409	
19	Pang Yao	Hong Kong	3:48.609	
20	Inna Metalnykova	Ukraine	3:53.303	
21	Maroesjka Matthee	South Africa	3:54.856	

=== Finals ===
The finals were started at 21:45.

Rank	Name	Nation	Time
Gold Medal Race
1st place, gold medalist(s)	Rebecca Wiasak	Australia	3:30.305
2nd place, silver medalist(s)	Jennifer Valente	United States	3:33.867
Bronze Medal Race
3rd place, bronze medalist(s)	Amy Cure	Australia	3:32.907
4	Joanna Rowsell	Great Britain	3:36.330
