= 2015 UCI Track Cycling World Championships – Women's keirin =

Women's keirin at the 2015 UCI Track Cycling World Championships
- Venue: Vélodrome de Saint-Quentin-en-Yvelines, Saint-Quentin-en-Yvelines
- Date: 22 February 2015
- Competitors: 23 from 17 nations

Medalists
gold medal	Anna Meares	Australia
silver medal	Shanne Braspennincx	Netherlands
bronze medal	Lisandra Guerra	Cuba

The Women's keirin event of the 2015 UCI Track Cycling World Championships was held on 22 February 2015.

== Results ==
=== First round ===
The first round was started at 11:40.

==== Heat 1 ====
Rank	Name	Nation	Gap	Notes
1	Lin Junhong	China		Q
2	Elena Brejniva	Russia	+0.028	Q
3	Lee Hye-jin	South Korea	+0.087	
4	Melissa Erickson	United States	+0.199	
5	Kristina Vogel	Germany	+0.527	

==== Heat 2 ====
Rank	Name	Nation	Gap	Notes
1	Anna Meares	Australia		Q
2	Monique Sullivan	Canada	+0.017	Q
3	Juliana Gaviria	Colombia	+0.083	
4	Ekaterina Gnidenko	Russia	+0.377	
5	Elis Ligtlee	Netherlands	+0.525	
6	Miriam Welte	Germany	+1.168	

==== Heat 3 ====
Rank	Name	Nation	Gap	Notes
1	Stephanie Morton	Australia		Q
2	Shanne Braspennincx	Netherlands	+0.069	Q
3	Guo Shuang	China	+0.087	
4	Lisandra Guerra	Cuba	+0.319	
5	Tania Calvo	Spain	+0.362	
6	Kanako Kase	Japan	+0.467	

==== Heat 4 ====
Rank	Name	Nation	Gap	Notes
1	Lee Wai Sze	Hong Kong		Q
2	Zhong Tianshi	China	+0.068	Q
3	Fatehah Mustapa	Malaysia	+0.141	
4	Jessica Varnish	Great Britain	+0.386	
5	Simona Krupeckaitė	Lithuania	+0.390	
6	Olivia Montauban	France	+0.563	

=== First round repechage ===
The first round repechage was started at 12:15.

==== Heat 1 ====
Rank	Name	Nation	Gap	Notes
1	Lee Hye-jin	South Korea		Q
2	Tania Calvo	Spain	+0.019	
	Jessica Varnish	Great Britain	REL	

==== Heat 2 ====
Rank	Name	Nation	Gap	Notes
1	Lisandra Guerra	Cuba		Q
2	Olivia Montauban	France	+0.065	
3	Juliana Gaviria	Colombia	+0.076	
4	Elis Ligtlee	Netherlands	+0.271	

==== Heat 3 ====
Rank	Name	Nation	Gap	Notes
1	Guo Shuang	China		Q
2	Miriam Welte	Germany	+0.104	
3	Kristina Vogel	Germany	+0.137	
4	Ekaterina Gnidenko	Russia	REL	

==== Heat 4 ====
Rank	Name	Nation	Gap	Notes
1	Fatehah Mustapa	Malaysia		Q
2	Melissa Erickson	United States	+0.052	
3	Kanako Kase	Japan	+0.139	
4	Simona Krupeckaitė	Lithuania	+0.183	

=== Second round ===
The second round was started at 14:55.

==== Heat 1 ====
Rank	Name	Nation	Gap	Notes
1	Lin Junhong	China		Q
2	Monique Sullivan	Canada	+0.318	Q
3	Shanne Braspennincx	Netherlands	+0.393	Q
4	Lee Wai Sze	Hong Kong	+0.543	
5	Fatehah Mustapa	Malaysia	+0.623	
6	Lee Hye-jin	South Korea	+0.633	

==== Heat 2 ====
Rank	Name	Nation	Gap	Notes
1	Anna Meares	Australia		Q
2	Stephanie Morton	Australia	+0.001	Q
3	Lisandra Guerra	Cuba	+0.069	Q
4	Zhong Tianshi	China	+0.086	
5	Guo Shuang	China	+0.111	
6	Elena Brejniva	Russia	REL	

=== Finals ===
The finals were started at 15:20.

==== Small final ====
Rank	Name	Nation	Gap	Notes
7	Lee Wai Sze	Hong Kong		
8	Elena Brejniva	Russia	+0.132	
9	Lee Hye-jin	South Korea	+0.190	
10	Zhong Tianshi	China	+0.279	
11	Guo Shuang	China	+0.382	
12	Fatehah Mustapa	Malaysia	+1.109	

==== Final ====
Rank	Name	Nation	Gap	Notes
1st place, gold medalist(s)	Anna Meares	Australia		
2nd place, silver medalist(s)	Shanne Braspennincx	Netherlands	+0.064	
3rd place, bronze medalist(s)	Lisandra Guerra	Cuba	+0.219	
4	Monique Sullivan	Canada	+0.371	
5	Lin Junhong	China	+0.623	
6	Stephanie Morton	Australia		
