= Switzerland at the UCI Track Cycling World Championships =

The following details concern Switzerland at the UCI Track Cycling World Championships.

== 2015 UCI Track Cycling World Championships ==
Switzerland at the 2015 UCI Track Cycling World Championships
- IOC code: SUI

in Saint-Quentin-en-Yvelines, France 18 February – 22 February 2015
- Competitors: 7
- Medals Ranked 8th: Gold 1 Silver 0 Bronze 0 Total 1

UCI Track Cycling World Championships appearances (overview)
- Overview page Recent: 2008; 2009; 2010; 2011; 2012; 2013; 2014; 2015; 2016; 2017; 2018; 2019; 2020; 2021; 2022; 2023; 2024; 2025

Switzerland competed at the 2015 UCI Track Cycling World Championships in Saint-Quentin-en-Yvelines at the Vélodrome de Saint-Quentin-en-Yvelines from 18 to 22 February 2015. A team of 7 cyclists (0 women, 7 men) was announced to represent the country in the event.

== Results ==
=== Men ===
Name	Event	Result	Rank
Stefan Küng	Men's individual pursuit	4:17.183 (Q), 4:19.184	1st place, gold medalist(s)
Tom Bohli	Men's individual pursuit	4:29.594	15
Cyrille Thièry	Men's scratch	—	18
Cyrille Thièry	Men's points race	—	DNF
Gaël Suter	Men's omnium	149 points	7
Théry Schir; Frank Pasche	Men's madison	2 points	12
Olivier Beer; Stefan Küng; Frank Pasche; Théry Schir	Men's team pursuit	3:58.887 (q),	6

== 2016 UCI Track Cycling World Championships ==
Switzerland at the 2016 UCI Track Cycling World Championships
- IOC code: SUI

in London, United Kingdom 2 March – 6 March 2016
- Competitors: 7 (7 men, 0 women)
- Medals: Gold 0 Silver 0 Bronze 1 Total 1

UCI Track Cycling World Championships appearances (overview)
- Recent: 2008; 2009; 2010; 2011; 2012; 2013; 2014; 2015; 2016; 2017; 2018; 2019; 2020; 2021; 2022; 2023; 2024; 2025

Switzerland competed at the 2016 UCI Track Cycling World Championships at the Lee Valley VeloPark in London, United Kingdom from 2–4 March 2016. A team of 7 cyclists (0 women, 7 men) was announced to represent the country in the event.

== Results ==
=== Men ===
Name	Event	Result	Rank
Silvan Dillier	Men's individual pursuit	266.538	12
Frank Pasche	Men's individual pursuit	268.582	15
Claudio Imhof	Men's scratch	—	3
Claudio Imhof	Men's points race	0 points	13
Olivier Beer; Silvan Dillier; Frank Pasche; Théry Schir	Men's team pursuit		9
Claudio Imhof; Théry Schir	Men's madison	11 points	4
