= Canada at the UCI Track Cycling World Championships =

Canada at the UCI Track Cycling World Championships was represented by teams of 13 cyclists at the 2015 championships and 15 at the 2016 championships. In 2015, Allison Beveridge won bronze in the women's scratch, while Beveridge, Jasmin Glaesser, Kirsti Lay, and Stephanie Roorda won bronze in the women's team pursuit.

At the 2016 championships, Canada won two silver and two bronze medals. Glaesser won silver in the women's points race, and Beveridge, Glaesser, Lay, and Georgia Simmerling took silver in the women's team pursuit. Annie Foreman-Mackey won bronze in the women's individual pursuit, while Roorda won bronze in the women's scratch.

== 2015 ==
Canada at the 2015 UCI Track Cycling World Championships
- IOC code: CAN

in Saint-Quentin-en-Yvelines, France 18 February – 22 February 2015
- Competitors: 13
- Medals Ranked 15th: Gold 0 Silver 2 Bronze 2 Total 4

UCI Track Cycling World Championships appearances (overview)
- Overview page Recent: 2009; 2010; 2011; 2012; 2013; 2014; 2015; 2016; 2017; 2018; 2019; 2020; 2021; 2022; 2023; 2024; 2025; 2026

Canada competed at the 2015 UCI Track Cycling World Championships in Saint-Quentin-en-Yvelines at the Vélodrome de Saint-Quentin-en-Yvelines from 18–22 February 2015. A team of 13 cyclists (8 women, 5 men) was announced to represent the country in the event.

== Results ==
=== Men ===
Name	Event	Result	Rank
Joseph Veloce	Men's sprint	9.992 (Q),	24
Hugo Barrette	Men's sprint	10.033	26
Hugo Barrette	Men's keirin		17
Hugo Barrette; Evan Carey; Joseph Veloce	Men's team sprint	44.428	13

=== Women ===
Name	Event	Result	Rank
Monique Sullivan	Women's sprint	11.016 (Q),	15
Kate O'Brien	Women's 500 m time trial	35.921	18
Jasmin Glaesser	Women's individual pursuit	3:34.827	6
Allison Beveridge	Women's scratch	—N/a	3rd place, bronze medalist(s)
Allison Beveridge; Jasmin Glaesser; Kirsti Lay; Stephanie Roorda	Women's team pursuit	4:20.699 (Q),	3rd place, bronze medalist(s)
Kate O'Brien; Monique Sullivan	Women's team sprint	34.994	12
Monique Sullivan	Women's keirin		4

== 2016 ==
Canada at the 2016 UCI Track Cycling World Championships
- IOC code: CAN

in London, United Kingdom 2 March – 6 March 2016
- Competitors: 15 (6 men, 9 women)
- Medals: Gold 0 Silver 2 Bronze 2 Total 4

UCI Track Cycling World Championships appearances (overview)
- Recent: 2009; 2010; 2011; 2012; 2013; 2014; 2015; 2016; 2017; 2018; 2019; 2020; 2021; 2022; 2023; 2024; 2025; 2026

Canada competed at the 2016 UCI Track Cycling World Championships at the Lee Valley VeloPark in London, United Kingdom from 2–4 March 2016. A team of 15 cyclists (9 women, 6 men) was announced to represent the country in the event.

== Results ==
=== Men ===
Name	Event	Result	Rank
Hugo Barrette	Men's sprint		17
Remi Pelletier-Roy	Men's individual pursuit	268.51	14
Hugo Barrette	Men's keirin	—N/a	20
Adam Jamieson; Sean MacKinnon; Rémi Pelletier-Roy; Ed Veal	Men's team pursuit		12

=== Women ===
Name	Event	Result	Rank
Annie Foreman-Mackey	Women's individual pursuit	3:35.694 (Q); 3:36.055	3rd place, bronze medalist(s)
Stephanie Roorda	Women's scratch	—N/a	3rd place, bronze medalist(s)
Kate O'Brien	Women's sprint		6
Monique Sullivan	Women's sprint		27
Kate O'Brien	Women's keirin		17
Monique Sullivan	Women's keirin		21
Jasmin Glaesser	Women's points race	14 points	2
Allison Beveridge	Women's omnium	159 points	4
Allison Beveridge; Jasmin Glaesser; Kirsti Lay; Georgia Simmerling	Women's team pursuit	04:20.664 (q), 04:19.525 (f)	2
Kate O'Brien; Monique Sullivan	Women's team sprint	33.867	9
