= Ukraine at the UCI Track Cycling World Championships =

Ukraine at the UCI Track Cycling World Championships.

== 2015 event ==
Ukraine at the 2015 UCI Track Cycling World Championships
- IOC code: UKR

in Saint-Quentin-en-Yvelines, France 18 February – 22 February 2015
- Competitors: 8
- Medals Ranked -th: Gold 0 Silver 0 Bronze 0 Total 0

UCI Track Cycling World Championships appearances (overview)
- Overview page Recent: 2008; 2009; 2010; 2011; 2012; 2013; 2014; 2015; 2016; 2017; 2018; 2019; 2020; 2021; 2022; 2023; 2024; 2025

Ukraine competed at the 2015 UCI Track Cycling World Championships in Saint-Quentin-en-Yvelines at the Vélodrome de Saint-Quentin-en-Yvelines from 18–22 February 2015. A team of 8 cyclists (4 women, 4 men) was announced to represent the country in the event.

=== Men ===
Name	Event	Result	Rank
Volodymyr Dzhus	Men's individual pursuit	4:32.507	17
Roman Gladysh	Men's scratch	—	4
Vitaliy Hryniv	Men's points race	0 points	19
Roman Gladysh; Vladyslav Kreminskyi	Men's madison	4 points	11

=== Women ===
Name	Event	Result	Rank
Olena Tsyos	Women's 500 m time trial	36.286	20
Inna Metalnykova	Women's individual pursuit	3:53.303	20
Tetyana Klimchenko	Women's points race	1 points	15
Tetyana Klimchenko	Women's scratch	—	11
Olena Starikova; Olena Tsyos	Women's team sprint	35.880	14

== 2016 event ==
Ukraine at the 2016 UCI Track Cycling World Championships
- IOC code: UKR

in London, United Kingdom 2 March – 6 March 2016
- Competitors: 9 (5 men, 4 women)

UCI Track Cycling World Championships appearances (overview)
- Recent: 2008; 2009; 2010; 2011; 2012; 2013; 2014; 2015; 2016; 2017; 2018; 2019; 2020; 2021; 2022; 2023; 2024; 2025

Ukraine competed at the 2016 UCI Track Cycling World Championships at the Lee Valley VeloPark in London, United Kingdom from 2–4 March 2016. A team of 9 cyclists (4 women, 5 men) was announced to represent the country in the event.

=== Men ===
Name	Event	Result	Rank
Andrii Vynokurov	Men's sprint		29
Andrii Vynokurov	Men's keirin	—	13
Roman Gladysh	Men's scratch	—	13
Vitaliy Hryniv	Men's points race	-39 points	DNF
Vitaliy Hryniv; Roman Gladysh; Vladyslav Kreminskyi; Taras Shevchuk	Men's team pursuit		14
Vladyslav Kreminskyi; Roman Gladysh	Men's madison		DNF

=== Women ===
Name	Event	Result	Rank
Liubov Basova	Women's sprint		23
Liubov Basova	Women's keirin		5
Tetyana Klimchenko	Women's scratch	—	19
Hanna Solovey	Women's points race	1 points	14
Olena Starikova; Lyubov Shulika	Women's team sprint	34.300	13
