= Ian Holt =

American cyclist

Personal information
- Born: April 1, 1982 (age 44) United States

Cycling career
- Sport: Cycling
- Current team: Pacific Premier Bank Cycling Team
- Disciplines: Road, track
- Role: Rider

Amateur teams
- 2015: Tierra Plan-CP Racing
- 2016–2018: Pacific Premier Bank Cycling Team

Ian Holt (born April 1, 1982) is an American track and road racing cyclist. He rode in the points race the 2016 UCI Track Cycling World Championships. Holt is a major in the United States Air Force and is in the world class athlete program.
