= 2015 UCI Track Cycling World Championships – Women's points race =

Women's points race at the 2015 UCI Track Cycling World Championships
- Venue: Vélodrome de Saint-Quentin-en-Yvelines, Saint-Quentin-en-Yvelines
- Date: 18 February 2015
- Competitors: 17 from 17 nations
- Winning points: 38

Medalists
gold medal	Stephanie Pohl	Germany
silver medal	Minami Uwano	Japan
bronze medal	Kimberly Geist	United States

The Women's points race event of the 2015 UCI Track Cycling World Championships was held on 18 February 2015.

== Results ==
The race was started at 20:40.

100 laps (25 km) were raced with 10 sprints.

Rank	Name	Nation	Sprint points	Lap points	Total points
1st place, gold medalist(s)	Stephanie Pohl	Germany	18	20	38
2nd place, silver medalist(s)	Minami Uwano	Japan	8	20	28
3rd place, bronze medalist(s)	Kimberly Geist	United States	5	20	25
4	Élise Delzenne	France	3	20	23
5	Giorgia Bronzini	Italy	20	0	20
6	Sofía Arreola	Mexico	13	0	13
7	Kirsten Wild	Netherlands	9	0	9
8	Arlenis Sierra	Cuba	7	0	7
9	Evgenia Romanyuta	Russia	5	0	5
10	Kelly Druyts	Belgium	4	0	4
11	Ina Savenka	Belarus	4	0	4
12	Leire Olaberria	Spain	4	0	4
13	María Luisa Calle	Colombia	3	0	3
14	Alžbeta Pavlendová	Slovakia	2	0	2
15	Tetyana Klimchenko	Ukraine	1	0	1
16	Katarzyna Pawłowska	Poland	1	0	1
17	Jarmila Machačová	Czech Republic	0	0	0
