= Japan at the UCI Track Cycling World Championships =

Japan at the UCI Track Cycling World Championships was represented by teams of 13 cyclists at both the 2015 and 2016 championships. In 2016, Yuta Wakimoto finished fifth in the men's keirin and Eiya Hashimoto placed fifth in the men's points race, Japan's highest placings listed for that championship.

== 2015 UCI Track Cycling World Championships ==
Japan at the 2015 UCI Track Cycling World Championships
- IOC code: JPN

in Saint-Quentin-en-Yvelines, France 18 February – 22 February 2015
- Competitors: 13
- Medals Ranked 14th: Gold 0 Silver 1 Bronze 0 Total 1

UCI Track Cycling World Championships appearances (overview)
- Overview page Recent: 2009; 2010; 2011; 2012; 2013; 2014; 2015; 2016; 2017; 2018; 2019; 2020; 2021; 2022; 2023; 2024; 2025; 2026

Japan competed at the 2015 UCI Track Cycling World Championships in Saint-Quentin-en-Yvelines at the Vélodrome de Saint-Quentin-en-Yvelines from 18–22 February 2015. A team of 13 cyclists (7 women, 6 men) was announced to represent the country in the event.

== Results ==
=== Men ===
Name	Event	Result	Rank
Seiichiro Nakagawa	Men's sprint	9.877 (Q),	19
Kazunari Watanabe	Men's sprint	10.038	27
Tomoyuki Kawabata	Men's sprint	10.089	30
Kazushige Kuboki	Men's points race	10 points	11
Kazunari Watanabe	Men's keirin		21
Kazuki Amagai; Seiichiro Nakagawa; Kazunari Watanabe	Men's team sprint	44.190	11

=== Women ===
Name	Event	Result	Rank
Kayono Maeda	Women's sprint	11.406	28
Takako Ishii	Women's sprint	11.290	30
Minami Uwano	Women's points race	28 points	
Sakura Tsukagoshi; Minami Uwano; Kanako Kase; Yoko Kojima	Women's team pursuit	4:35.929	12
Takako Ishii; Kayono Maeda	Women's team sprint	35.318	13
Kanako Kase	Women's keirin		17

== 2016 UCI Track Cycling World Championships ==
Japan at the 2016 UCI Track Cycling World Championships
- IOC code: JPN

in London, United Kingdom 2 March – 6 March 2016
- Competitors: 13 (7 men, 6 women)
- Medals: Gold 0 Silver 0 Bronze 0 Total 0

UCI Track Cycling World Championships appearances (overview)
- Recent: 2009; 2010; 2011; 2012; 2013; 2014; 2015; 2016; 2017; 2018; 2019; 2020; 2021; 2022; 2023; 2024; 2025; 2026

Japan competed at the 2016 UCI Track Cycling World Championships at the Lee Valley VeloPark in London, United Kingdom from 2–4 March 2016. A team of 13 cyclists (6 women, 7 men) was announced to represent the country in the event.

== Results ==
=== Men ===
Name	Event	Result	Rank
Kazuki Amagai; Kazunari Watanabe; Seiichiro Nakagawa	Men's team sprint	44.96	12
Seiichiro Nakagawa	Men's sprint		20
Yuta Wakimoto	Men's keirin	—N/a	5
Eiya Hashimoto	Men's points race	31 points	5

=== Women ===
Name	Event	Result	Rank
Kayono Maeda	Women's sprint		31
Takako Ishii	Women's sprint		33
Minami Uwano	Women's individual pursuit	03:49.788	13
Kayono Maeda	Women's keirin		21
Minami Uwano	Women's scratch	—N/a	11
Minami Uwano	Women's points race	2 points	13
Sakura Tsukagoshi	Women's omnium	62 points	18
Sakura Tsukagoshi; Minami Uwano; Yumi Kajihara; Kisato Nakamura	Women's team pursuit	04:38.394	13
Takako Ishii; Kayono Maeda	Women's team sprint	34.721	14
