= Belarus at the UCI Track Cycling World Championships =

Belarus at the UCI Track Cycling World Championships was represented by 12 cyclists at the 2015 championships and eight at the 2016 championships. Belarus won no medals at either event. In 2015, Raman Tsishkou and Tatsiana Sharakova each finished sixth in the men's and women's omnium, respectively. In 2016, Raman Ramanau placed fourth in the men's scratch and sixth in the points race, while Mikhail Shemetau finished fifth in the men's individual pursuit.

== 2015 UCI Track Cycling World Championships ==
Belarus at the 2015 UCI Track Cycling World Championships
- IOC code: BLR

in Saint-Quentin-en-Yvelines, France 18 February – 22 February 2015
- Competitors: 12
- Medals Ranked -th: Gold 0 Silver 0 Bronze 0 Total 0

UCI Track Cycling World Championships appearances (overview)
- Overview page Recent: 2009; 2010; 2011; 2012; 2013; 2014; 2015; 2016; 2017; 2018; 2019; 2020; 2021; 2022; 2023; 2024; 2025; 2026

Belarus competed at the 2015 UCI Track Cycling World Championships in Saint-Quentin-en-Yvelines at the Vélodrome de Saint-Quentin-en-Yvelines from 18–22 February 2015. A team of 12 cyclists (6 women, 6 men) was announced to represent the country in the event.

== Results ==
=== Men ===
Name	Event	Result	Rank
Aleh Ahiyevich	Men's individual pursuit	4:33.983	19
Hardzei Tsishchanka	Men's scratch	—N/a	13
Raman Ramanau	Men's points race	16 points	8
Raman Tsishkou	Men's omnium	159 points	6
Raman Tsishkou; Raman Ramanau; Yauheni Akhramenka; Hardzei Tsishchanka	Men's team pursuit	4:05.953	14

=== Women ===
Name	Event	Result	Rank
Ina Savenka	Women's points race	4 points	11
Tatsiana Sharakova	Women's omnium	131 points	6
Marina Shmayankova	Women's scratch	—N/a	21
Ina Savenka; Volha Antonava; Polina Pivovarova; Marina Shmayankova	Women's team pursuit	4:35.495	11

== 2016 UCI Track Cycling World Championships ==
Belarus at the 2016 UCI Track Cycling World Championships
- IOC code: BLR

in London, United Kingdom 2 March – 6 March 2016
- Competitors: 8 (4 men, 4 women)
- Medals: Gold 0 Silver 0 Bronze 0 Total 0

UCI Track Cycling World Championships appearances (overview)
- Recent: 2009; 2010; 2011; 2012; 2013; 2014; 2015; 2016; 2017; 2018; 2019; 2020; 2021; 2022; 2023; 2024; 2025; 2026

Belarus competed at the 2016 UCI Track Cycling World Championships at the Lee Valley VeloPark in London, United Kingdom from 2–4 March 2016. A team of 8 cyclists (4 women, 4 men) was announced to represent the country in the event.

== Results ==
=== Men ===
Name	Event	Result	Rank
Mikhail Shemetau	Men's individual pursuit	259.017	5
Raman Ramanau	Men's scratch	—N/a	4
Raman Ramanau	Men's points race	13 points	6

=== Women ===
Name	Event	Result	Rank
Marina Shmayankova	Women's scratch	—N/a	10
Ina Savenka	Women's points race	5 points	10
Ina Savenka; Katsiaryna Piatrouskaya; Polina Pivovarova; Marina Shmayankova	Women's team pursuit	04:32.952	11
Tatsiana Sharakova	Women's omnium	73 points	15
