= Jacob Duehring =

American cyclist

Personal information
- Born: August 8, 1985 (age 41)

Cycling career
- Sport: Cycling
- Discipline: Track
- Role: Rider
- Rider type: Mass Start
Medal record
Men's track cycling
Representing United States
Pan American Championships
Gold medal – first place	2014 Aguascalientes	Madison
Gold medal – first place	2015 Santiago	Madison

Jacob Duehring (born August 8, 1985) is an American former professional track cyclist. He competed in the omnium event at the 2014 and 2015 UCI Track Cycling World Championships.
