= Kimberly Geist =

American cyclist

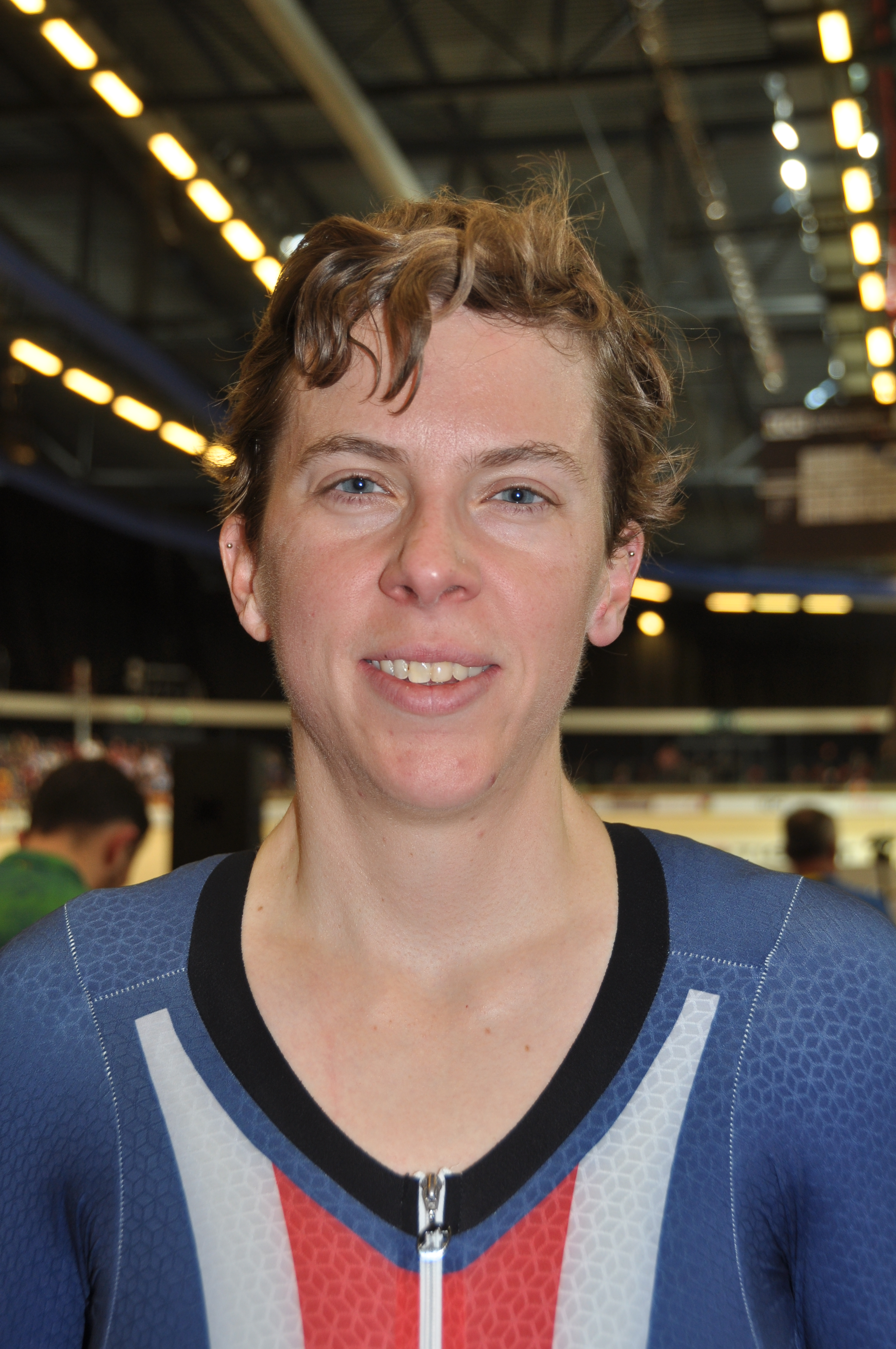
- Geist in 2018

Personal information
- Born: April 29, 1987 (age 39) Allentown, Pennsylvania, United States
- Height: 5 ft 8 in (173 cm)

Cycling career
- Sport: Cycling
- Role: Rider
Medal record
Women's track cycling
Representing United States
World Championships
Gold medal – first place	2017 Hong Kong	Team pursuit
Gold medal – first place	2018 Apeldoorn	Team pursuit
Bronze medal – third place	2015 Yvelines	Points race
Pan American Games
Gold medal – first place	2019 Lima	Team pursuit
Gold medal – first place	2019 Lima	Madison
Pan American Championships
Gold medal – first place	2014 Aguascalientes	Team pursuit
Gold medal – first place	2018 Aguascalientes	Team pursuit
Silver medal – second place	2015 Santiago	Points race
Silver medal – second place	2017 Couva	Madison
Bronze medal – third place	2018 Aguascalientes	Madison

Kimberly Geist (born April 29, 1987) is an American professional racing cyclist. She rode at the 2015 UCI Track Cycling World Championships, winning the bronze medal in the points race.

== Major results ==
2013
2nd Team Pursuit, Los Angeles Grand Prix (with Sarah Hammer, Jennifer Valente and Ruth Winder)
2014
1st Team Pursuit, Pan American Track Championships (with Amber Gaffney, Elizabeth Newell and Jennifer Valente)
1st Points Race, Festival of Speed
2nd Scratch Race, Keirin Revenge
3rd Scratch Race, US Sprint GP
3rd Points Race, Fastest Man on Wheels
2015
1st Scratch Race, US Sprint GP
1st Points Race, Festival of Speed
1st Individual Pursuit, Grand Prix of Colorado Springs
2nd Points Race, Pan American Track Championships
2017
1st Madison, Öschelbronn (with Kimberly Zubris)
3rd Madison, Oberhausen (with Kimberly Zubris)
