= Hong Kong at the UCI Track Cycling World Championships =

This page is an overview of Hong Kong at the UCI Track Cycling World Championships.

== 2015 ==
Hong Kong at the 2015 UCI Track Cycling World Championships
- IOC code: HKG

in Saint-Quentin-en-Yvelines, France 18 February – 22 February 2015
- Competitors: 11
- Medals Ranked -th: Gold 0 Silver 0 Bronze 0 Total 0

UCI Track Cycling World Championships appearances (overview)
- Overview page Recent: 2008; 2009; 2010; 2011; 2012; 2013; 2014; 2015; 2016; 2017; 2018; 2019; 2020; 2021; 2022; 2023; 2024; 2025

Hong Kong competed at the 2015 UCI Track Cycling World Championships in Saint-Quentin-en-Yvelines at the Vélodrome de Saint-Quentin-en-Yvelines from 18–22 February 2015. A team of 11 cyclists (6 women, 5 men) was announced to represent the country in the event.

== Results ==
=== Men ===
Name	Event	Result	Rank
Wu Lok Chun	Men's 1 km time trial	1:04.043	18
Cheung King Lok	Men's individual pursuit	4:55.764	20
Cheung King Lok	Men's scratch	—	5
Cheung King Lok	Men's points race	27 points	5
Leung Chun Wing	Men's omnium	76 points	16
Cheung King Lok; Leung Chun Wing	Men's madison	1 points	13

=== Women ===
Name	Event	Result	Rank
Lee Wai Sze	Women's sprint	10.932 (Q),	13
Lee Wai Sze	Women's 500 m time trial	33.788	5
Lee Wai Sze	Women's keirin		7
Pang Yao	Women's individual pursuit	3:48.609	19
Diao Xiaojuan	Women's omnium	55 points	20
Yang Qianyu	Women's scratch	—	14
Pang Yao; Yang Qianyu; Leung Bo Yee; Meng Zhao Juan	Women's team pursuit	4:37.798	14
Diao Xiao Juan; Meng Zhao Juan	Women's team sprint	37.053	15

== 2016 ==
Hong Kong at the 2016 UCI Track Cycling World Championships
- IOC code: HKG

in London, United Kingdom 2 March – 6 March 2016
- Competitors: 7 (3 men, 4 women)
- Medals: Gold Silver 1 Bronze Total

UCI Track Cycling World Championships appearances (overview)
- Recent: 2008; 2009; 2010; 2011; 2012; 2013; 2014; 2015; 2016; 2017; 2018; 2019; 2020; 2021; 2022; 2023; 2024; 2025

Hong Kong competed at the 2016 UCI Track Cycling World Championships at the Lee Valley VeloPark in London, United Kingdom from 2–4 March 2016. A team of 7 cyclists (4 women, 3 men) was announced to represent the country in the event.

== Results ==
=== Men ===
Name	Event	Result	Rank
King Lok Cheung	Men's scratch	—	5
King Lok Cheung	Men's points race	6 points	9
Cheung King Lok; Leung Chun Wing	Men's madison	0 points (-3 laps down)	14

=== Women ===
Name	Event	Result	Rank
Wai Sze Lee	Women's sprint		7
Wai Sze Lee	Women's 500 m time trial	33.736 sec	2
Yao Pang	Women's individual pursuit	03:49.559	12
Wai Sze Lee	Women's keirin		9
Qianyu Yang	Women's scratch	—	8
Yao Pang	Women's points race	0 points	18
Xiao Juan Diao	Women's omnium	56 points	19
