= Italy at the UCI Track Cycling World Championships =

The following are the results for Italy at the UCI Track Cycling World Championships by year.

== 2015 ==
Italy at the 2015 UCI Track Cycling World Championships
- IOC code: ITA

in Saint-Quentin-en-Yvelines, France 18 February – 22 February 2015
- Competitors: 20
- Medals Ranked 13th: Gold 0 Silver 1 Bronze 1 Total 2

UCI Track Cycling World Championships appearances (overview)
- Overview page Recent: 2008; 2009; 2010; 2011; 2012; 2013; 2014; 2015; 2016; 2017; 2018; 2019; 2020; 2021; 2022; 2023; 2024; 2025

Italy competed at the 2015 UCI Track Cycling World Championships in Saint-Quentin-en-Yvelines at the Vélodrome de Saint-Quentin-en-Yvelines from 18–22 February 2015. A team of 20 cyclists (9 women, 11 men) was announced to represent the country in the event.

== Riders ==
Women Beatrice Bartelloni Giorgia Bronzini Elena Cecchini Maria Giulia Confalonieri Annalisa Cucinotta Simona Frapporti Tatiana Guderzo Francesca Pattaro Silvia Valsecchi	Men Liam Bertazzo Alex Buttazzoni Davide Ceci Francesco Ceci Marco Coledan Simone Consonni Filippo Fortin Filippo Ganna Francesco Lamon Michele Scartezzini Elia Viviani

== Results ==
=== Men ===
Name	Event	Result	Rank
Francesco Ceci	Men's 1 km time trial	1:01.924	13
Marco Coledan	Men's individual pursuit	4:30.403	16
Liam Bertazzo	Men's individual pursuit	4:33.110	18
Alex Buttazzoni	Men's scratch	—	19
Liam Bertazzo	Men's points race	24 points	6
Elia Viviani	Men's omnium	181 points	3rd place, bronze medalist(s)
Francesco Ceci	Men's keirin		21
Marco Coledan; Elia Viviani	Men's madison	20 points	2nd place, silver medalist(s)
Simone Consonni; Elia Viviani; Liam Bertazzo; Marco Coledan	Men's team pursuit	4:07.165	16

=== Women ===
Name	Event	Result	Rank
Silvia Valsecchi	Women's individual pursuit	3:45.324	17
Giorgia Bronzini	Women's points race	20 points	5
Simona Frapporti	Women's omnium	98 points	13
Annalisa Cucinotta	Women's scratch	—	6
Simona Frapporti; Beatrice Bartelloni; Tatiana Guderzo; Silvia Valsecchi	Women's team pursuit	4:32.198 (q),	8

== 2016 ==
Italy at the 2016 UCI Track Cycling World Championships
- IOC code: ITA

in London, United Kingdom 2 March – 6 March 2016
- Competitors: 16 (8 men, 8 women)

UCI Track Cycling World Championships appearances (overview)
- Recent: 2008; 2009; 2010; 2011; 2012; 2013; 2014; 2015; 2016; 2017; 2018; 2019; 2020; 2021; 2022; 2023; 2024; 2025

Italy competed at the 2016 UCI Track Cycling World Championships at the Lee Valley VeloPark in London, United Kingdom from 2–4 March 2016. A team of 16 cyclists (8 women, 8 men) was announced to represent the country in the event.

== Results ==
=== Men ===
Name	Event	Result	Rank
Filippo Ganna	Men's individual pursuit	256.127 (q), 256.141 (f)	1
Francesco Ceci	Men's keirin	—	13
Elia Viviani	Men's scratch	—	12
Liam Bertazzo	Men's points race	-17 points	DNF
Elia Viviani; Liam Bertazzo; Simone Consonni; Francesco Lamon	Men's team pursuit		4
Elia Viviani; Liam Bertazzo	Men's madison	10 points (-4 laps down)	15

=== Women ===
Name	Event	Result	Rank
Beatrice Bartelloni	Women's individual pursuit	03:40.394	8
Maria Giulia Confalonieri	Women's scratch	—	14
Elena Cecchini	Women's points race	4 points	11
Simona Frapporti; Tatiana Guderzo; Francesca Pattaro; Silvia Valsecchi	Women's team pursuit	04:29.857 (q), Overtaken (f)	6
Simona Frapporti	Women's omnium	98 points	12
