= Belgium at the UCI Track Cycling World Championships =

Belgium at the 2015 UCI Track Cycling World Championships
- IOC code: BEL

in Saint-Quentin-en-Yvelines, France 18 February – 22 February 2015
- Competitors: 10
- Medals Ranked 16th: Gold 0 Silver 0 Bronze 1 Total 1

UCI Track Cycling World Championships appearances (overview)
- Overview page Recent: 2009; 2010; 2011; 2012; 2013; 2014; 2015; 2016; 2017; 2018; 2019; 2020; 2021; 2022; 2023; 2024; 2025; 2026

Belgium at the UCI Track Cycling World Championships was represented by 10 cyclists at the 2015 championships and six at the 2016 championships. In 2015, Jasper De Buyst and Otto Vergaerde won bronze in the men's madison, Belgium's only medal of the championships. In 2016, Kenny De Ketele finished third in the men's points race, while De Ketele and Moreno De Pauw placed seventh in the men's madison.

== 2015 results ==
Belgium competed at the 2015 UCI Track Cycling World Championships in Saint-Quentin-en-Yvelines at the Vélodrome de Saint-Quentin-en-Yvelines from 18–22 February 2015. A team of 10 cyclists (3 women, 7 men) was announced to represent the country in the event.

=== Men ===
Name	Event	Result	Rank
Dominique Cornu	Men's individual pursuit	4:26.032	11
Otto Vergaerde	Men's scratch	—N/a	11
Moreno De Pauw	Men's points race	10 points	12
Jasper De Buyst	Men's omnium	178 points	4
Jasper De Buyst; Otto Vergaerde	Men's madison	15 points	3rd place, bronze medalist(s)
Jasper De Buyst; Moreno De Pauw; Dominique Cornu; Jonathan Dufrasne	Men's team pursuit	4:02.383	9

=== Women ===
Name	Event	Result	Rank
Lotte Kopecky	Women's individual pursuit	3:41.044	14
Kelly Druyts	Women's points race	4 points	10
Jolien D'Hoore	Women's omnium	166 points	4
Kelly Druyts	Women's scratch	—N/a	7

== 2016 results ==
Belgium at the 2016 UCI Track Cycling World Championships
- IOC code: BEL

in London, United Kingdom 2 March – 6 March 2016
- Competitors: 6 (3 men, 3 women)
- Medals: Gold 0 Silver 0 Bronze 0 Total 0

UCI Track Cycling World Championships appearances (overview)
- Recent: 2009; 2010; 2011; 2012; 2013; 2014; 2015; 2016; 2017; 2018; 2019; 2020; 2021; 2022; 2023; 2024; 2025; 2026

Belgium competed at the 2016 UCI Track Cycling World Championships at the Lee Valley VeloPark in London, United Kingdom from 2–4 March 2016. A team of 6 cyclists (3 women, 3 men) was announced to represent the country in the event.

=== Men ===
Name	Event	Result	Rank
Jonathan Dufrasne	Men's individual pursuit	266.016	11
Moreno De Pauw	Men's scratch	—N/a	11
Kenny De Ketele	Men's points race	43 points	3
Kenny De Ketele; Moreno De Pauw	Men's madison	15 points (-1 laps down)	7

Sources: "2016 UCI Track Cycling World Championships - London". Sport Result. Tissot Timing. February 2016. Archived from the original on 15 March 2016.

=== Women ===
Name	Event	Result	Rank
Lotte Kopecky	Women's individual pursuit	03:40.702	9
Jolien D'Hoore	Women's scratch	—N/a	4
Lotte Kopecky	Women's points race	2 points	12
Jolien D'Hoore	Women's omnium	157 points	6
