= UCI Track Cycling World Championships =

Track cycling races

- Rainbow jersey track cycling
- Genre: Track cycling
- Frequency: Annually
- Inaugurated: 1893
- Previous event: 2026
- Next event: 2027
- Organiser: UCI

The UCI Track Cycling World Championships are the set of world championship events for the various disciplines and distances in track cycling. They are regulated by the Union Cycliste Internationale. Before 1900, they were administered by the UCI's predecessor, the International Cycling Association (ICA).

Current events include: time trial, keirin, individual pursuit, team pursuit, points race, scratch race, sprint, team sprint, omnium, madison and elimination race. Until 2024, women's events were generally shorter than men's. Since 2025, all events have the same length. Events which are no longer held include the motor paced events and tandem events.

== History ==
World championships were first held in 1893, in Chicago, under the ICA. They were for amateurs. Separate professional races were held from 1895, in Cologne. Amateurs and professionals competed in separate events until 1993, after which they raced together in "open" races. Championships are open to riders selected by their national cycling association. They compete in the colours of their country.

The winner of ICA championships received a gold medal. The UCI awards a gold medal and a rainbow jersey to the winner. Silver and bronze medals are awarded to the second and third place contestants. World champions wear their rainbow jersey until the following year's championship, but they may wear it only in the type of event in which they won it. Former champions can wear rainbow cuffs to their everyday jerseys.

World track championships are allocated to different countries each year. They are run by that country's national cycling association, although the top referees (President of the Commissaire's panel – PCP, Secretary, Starter, and Judge Referee) are International Commissaires appointed by the UCI.

== Venues ==
To take advantage of the best weather conditions and reduce the risk of weather-related program changes, the UCI has long organized track world championships in the (northern) summer. Until 1966, the competition must by regulation take place on an open-air velodrome. It was not until the 1969 edition, organized at the Antwerps Sportpaleis, that the first championship was held on an indoor velodrome. From 1987, the trend reversed and indoor velodromes took over. From 1987 to 1995, there were five world championships organized on an indoor velodrome. Colombia hosts in 1995 the last track world championship organized outdoor.

=== Hosts ===
Hosts	Editions hosted
France	17
Germany	14
Belgium	13
Italy	13
Denmark	11
United Kingdom	10
Netherlands	8
Switzerland	8
Spain	5
United States	4
Australia	3
Canada, Poland, Austria, Czechoslovakia, Colombia	2
Hong Kong, Belarus, Venezuela, Japan, Norway, Hungary, Uruguay, Chile	1

== Championships ==
Number	Year	Country	City	Velodrome				Events
Number	Year	Country	City	Name	Length	Surface	In-/Out-door	Events
1	1893	United States	Chicago	South Side Park				3
2	1894	Belgium	Antwerp	Zurenborg velodrome	400 m	concrete	Outdoor	3
3	1895	Germany	Cologne	Riehler Radrennbahn	333.33 m			4
4	1896	Denmark	Copenhagen	Ordrupbanen	333.33 m	concrete	Outdoor	4
5	1897	United Kingdom	Glasgow	Celtic Park				4
6	1898	Austria	Vienna	Prater Park				4
7	1899	Canada	Montreal	Vélodrome de Queen's Park				4
8	1900	France	Paris	Parc des Princes	666 m	concrete	Outdoor	4
9	1901	Germany	Berlin	Radrennbahn Friedenau	500 m	concrete	Outdoor	4
10	1902	Italy	Rome	Velodromo di Porta Salaria	500 m	concrete	Outdoor	4
10	1902	Germany	Berlin	Radrennbahn Friedenau	500 m	concrete	Outdoor	4
11	1903	Denmark	Copenhagen	Ordrupbanen	370 m	concrete	Outdoor	4
12	1904	United Kingdom	London	Crystal Palace				4
13	1905	Belgium	Antwerp	Zurenborg velodrome	400 m	wood	Outdoor	4
14	1906	Switzerland	Geneva	Vélodrome de la Jonction				4
15	1907	France	Paris	Parc des Princes	666 m	concrete	Outdoor	4
16	1908	Germany	Leipzig	Sportplatz Leipzig				4
16	1908	Germany	Berlin	Radrennbahn Steglitz				4
17	1909	Denmark	Copenhagen	Ordrupbanen	370 m	concrete	Outdoor	4
18	1910	Belgium	Brussels	Velodroom van Karreveld				4
19	1911	Italy	Rome	Motovelodromo Appio	400 m	concrete	Outdoor	4
20	1912	United States	Newark	Newark Velodrome	268 m	wood	Outdoor	3
21	1913	Germany	Berlin	Deutsches Stadion	666 m		Outdoor	4
21	1913	Germany	Leipzig	Sportplatz Leipzig	500 m		Outdoor	4
22	1914	Denmark	Copenhagen	Ordrupbanen	370 m	concrete	Outdoor	1
1915–1919: not held due to World War I
23	1920	Belgium	Antwerp	The Garden City Velodrome	400 m	concrete	Outdoor	3
24	1921	Denmark	Copenhagen	Ordrupbanen	370 m	concrete	Outdoor	3
25	1922	United Kingdom	Liverpool	Liverpool Velodrome				3
25	1922	France	Paris	Parc des Princes	666 m	concrete	Outdoor	3
26	1923	Switzerland	Zürich	Oerlikon Velodrome	333.33 m	concrete	Outdoor	3
27	1924	France	Paris	Parc des Princes	666 m	concrete	Outdoor	3
28	1925	Netherlands	Amsterdam	Olympisch Stadion				3
29	1926	Italy	Milan	Velódromo Sempione				3
29	1926	Italy	Turin	Motovelodromo di Corso Casale				3
30	1927	Germany	Cologne	Müngersdorfer Radrennbahn				3
30	1927	Germany	Elberfeld	Stadion am Zoo				3
31	1928	Hungary	Budapest	Millenáris Sporttelep				3
32	1929	Switzerland	Zürich	Oerlikon Velodrome	333.33 m	concrete	Outdoor	3
33	1930	Belgium	Brussels	Heysel Stadium				3
34	1931	Denmark	Copenhagen	Ordrupbanen	370 m	concrete	Outdoor	3
35	1932	Italy	Rome	Stadio Nazionale PNF				3
36	1933	France	Paris	Parc des Princes	454 m	concrete	Outdoor	3
37	1934	Germany	Leipzig	Sportplatz Leipzig				3
38	1935	Belgium	Brussels	Heysel Stadium				3
39	1936	Switzerland	Zürich	Oerlikon Velodrome	333.33 m	concrete	Outdoor	3
40	1937	Denmark	Copenhagen	Ordrupbanen	370 m	concrete	Outdoor	3
41	1938	Netherlands	Amsterdam	Olympisch Stadion			Outdoor	3
42	1939	Italy	Milan	Velodromo Vigorelli	397.27 m	wood	Outdoor, track covered	2
1940–1945: not held due to World War II
43	1946	Switzerland	Zürich	Oerlikon Velodrome	333.33 m	concrete	Outdoor	5
44	1947	France	Paris	Parc des Princes	454 m	concrete	Outdoor	5
45	1948	Netherlands	Amsterdam	Olympisch Stadion			Outdoor	5
46	1949	Denmark	Copenhagen	Ordrupbanen	370 m	concrete	Outdoor	5
47	1950	Belgium	Rocourt	Stade Vélodrome de Rocourt			Outdoor	5
48	1951	Italy	Milan	Velodromo Vigorelli	397.27 m	wood	Outdoor, track covered	5
49	1952	France	Paris	Parc des Princes	454 m	concrete	Outdoor	5
50	1953	Switzerland	Zürich	Oerlikon Velodrome	333.33 m	concrete	Outdoor	5
51	1954	West Germany	Cologne	Müngersdorfer Stadion	400 m	concrete	Outdoor	5
51	1954	West Germany	Wuppertal	Stadion am Zoo				5
52	1955	Italy	Milan	Velodromo Vigorelli	397.27 m	wood	Outdoor, track covered	5
53	1956	Denmark	Copenhagen	Ordrupbanen	370 m	concrete	Outdoor	5
54	1957	Belgium	Rocourt	Stade Vélodrome de Rocourt			Outdoor	5
55	1958	France	Paris	Parc des Princes	454 m	concrete	Outdoor	8
56	1959	Netherlands	Amsterdam	Olympisch Stadion			Outdoor	8
57	1960	East Germany	Leipzig	Alfred-Rosch-Kampfbahn				8
57	1960	East Germany	Chemnitz	Chemnitz Velodrome				8
58	1961	Switzerland	Zürich	Oerlikon Velodrome	333.33 m	concrete	Outdoor	8
59	1962	Italy	Milan	Velodromo Vigorelli	397.27 m	wood	Outdoor, track covered	
60	1963	Belgium	Rocourt	Stade Vélodrome de Rocourt			Outdoor	9
61	1964	France	Paris	Parc des Princes	454 m	concrete	Outdoor	9
62	1965	Spain	San Sebastián	Velódromo de Anoeta	285.714 m	concrete	Outdoor	9
63	1966	West Germany	Frankfurt	Waldstadion	400 m	concrete	Outdoor	11
64	1967	Netherlands	Amsterdam	Olympisch Stadion			Outdoor	11
65	1968	Italy	Rome	Olympic Velodrome	400 m	wood	Outdoor	11
65	1968	Uruguay	Montevideo	Americo Ricaldoni	333.33 m	concrete	Outdoor	11
66	1969	Belgium	Antwerp	Sportpaleis	250 m	wood	Indoor	11
66	1969	Czechoslovakia	Brno	Brno Velodrome	400 m	concrete	Outdoor, track covered	11
67	1970	United Kingdom	Leicester	Saffron Lane Velodrome	333.33 m	wood	Outdoor	11
68	1971	Italy	Varese	Luigi Ganna Velodrome	446 m	concrete	Outdoor	11
69	1972	France	Marseille	Stade Vélodrome				6
70	1973	Spain	San Sebastián	Velódromo de Anoeta	285.714 m	concrete	Indoor	11
71	1974	Canada	Montreal	Le Stade du CEPSUM			Outdoor	11
72	1975	Belgium	Rocourt	Stade Vélodrome de Rocourt			Outdoor	11
73	1976	Italy	Monteroni di Lecce	Ulivi Velodrome	333.33 m	wood	Outdoor	7
74	1977	Venezuela	San Cristóbal	José de Jesús Mora Figueroa Velodrome	333.33 m	concrete	Outdoor	12
75	1978	West Germany	Munich	Radstadion	285.714 m	wood		12
76	1979	Netherlands	Amsterdam	Olympisch Stadion			Outdoor	12
77	1980	France	Besançon	Stade Léo Lagrange			Outdoor	10
78	1981	Czechoslovakia	Brno	Brno Velodrome	400 m	concrete	Outdoor, track covered	14
79	1982	United Kingdom	Leicester	Saffron Lane Velodrome	333.33 m	wood	Outdoor	14
80	1983	Switzerland	Zürich	Oerlikon Velodrome	333.33 m	concrete	Outdoor	14
81	1984	Spain	Barcelona	Velòdrom d'Horta	250 m	wood	Outdoor	9
82	1985	Italy	Bassano del Grappa	Stadio Rino Mercante	400 m	concrete	Outdoor	14
83	1986	United States	Colorado Springs	7-Eleven USOTC Velodrome	333.33 m	concrete	Outdoor	14
84	1987	Austria	Vienna	Ferry-Dusika-Hallenstadion	250 m	wood	Indoor	14
85	1988	Belgium	Ghent	Vlaams Wielercentrum Eddy Merckx	250 m	wood	Indoor	9
86	1989	France	Lyon	Vélodrome Georges-Préveral	333.33 m	resin	Outdoor	15
87	1990	Japan	Maebashi	Green Dome Maebashi	335 m		Indoor	15
88	1991	Germany	Stuttgart	Hanns-Martin-Schleyer-Halle	285.714 m	wood	Indoor	15
89	1992	Spain	Valencia	Luis Puig Velodrome	250 m	concrete	Indoor	8
90	1993	Norway	Hamar	Vikingskipet	250 m	wood	Indoor	11
91	1994	Italy	Palermo	Velodromo Paolo Borsellino	400 m	concrete	Outdoor	11
92	1995	Colombia	Bogotá	Luis Carlos Galán Velodrome	333.33 m	concrete	Outdoor	12
93	1996	United Kingdom	Manchester	Manchester Velodrome	250 m	wood	Indoor	12
94	1997	Australia	Perth	Perth SpeedDome	250 m	wood	Indoor	12
95	1998	France	Bordeaux	Vélodrome de Bordeaux	250 m	wood	Indoor	12
96	1999	Germany	Berlin	Velodrom	250 m	wood	Indoor	12
97	2000	United Kingdom	Manchester	Manchester Velodrome	250 m	wood	Indoor	12
98	2001	Belgium	Antwerp	Sportpaleis	250 m	wood	Indoor	12
99	2002	Denmark	Ballerup	Siemens Arena	250 m	wood	Indoor	15
100	2003	Germany	Stuttgart	Hanns-Martin-Schleyer-Halle	285.714 m	wood	Indoor	15
101	2004	Australia	Melbourne	Melbourne Park Multi-Purpose Venue	250 m	wood	Indoor	15
102	2005	United States	Los Angeles	VELO Sports Center	250 m	wood	Indoor	15
103	2006	France	Bordeaux	Vélodrome de Bordeaux	250 m	wood	Indoor	15
104	2007	Spain	Palma de Mallorca	Palma Arena	250 m	wood	Indoor	17
105	2008	United Kingdom	Manchester	Manchester Velodrome	250 m	wood	Indoor	18
106	2009	Poland	Pruszków	BGŻ Arena	250 m	wood	Indoor	19
107	2010	Denmark	Ballerup	Ballerup Super Arena	250 m	wood	Indoor	19
108	2011	Netherlands	Apeldoorn	Omnisport Apeldoorn	250 m	wood	Indoor	19
109	2012	Australia	Melbourne	Melbourne Park Multi-Purpose Venue	250 m	wood	Indoor	19
110	2013	Belarus	Minsk	Minsk-Arena	250 m	wood	Indoor	19
111	2014	Colombia	Cali	Velódromo Alcides Nieto Patiño	250 m	wood	Outdoor, fully covered	19
112	2015	France	Saint-Quentin-en-Yvelines	Vélodrome de Saint-Quentin-en-Yvelines	250 m	wood	Indoor	19
113	2016	United Kingdom	London	Lee Valley VeloPark	250 m	wood	Indoor	19
114	2017	Hong Kong	Tseung Kwan O New Town	Hong Kong Velodrome	250 m	wood	Indoor	20
115	2018	Netherlands	Apeldoorn	Omnisport Apeldoorn	250 m	wood	Indoor	20
116	2019	Poland	Pruszków	BGŻ Arena	250 m	wood	Indoor	20
117	2020	Germany	Berlin	Velodrom	250 m	wood	Indoor	20
118	2021	France	Roubaix	Vélodrome Couvert Régional Jean-Stablinski	250 m	wood	Indoor	22
119	2022	France	Saint-Quentin-en-Yvelines	Vélodrome de Saint-Quentin-en-Yvelines	250 m	wood	Indoor	22
120	2023	United Kingdom	Glasgow (Note: Held in conjunction with the 2023 UCI Cycling World Championships)	Sir Chris Hoy Velodrome	250 m	wood	Indoor	22
121	2024	Denmark	Ballerup	Ballerup Super Arena	250 m	wood	Indoor	22
122	2025	Chile	Santiago	Velódromo Peñalolén	250 m	wood	Indoor	22
123	2026	China	Shanghai	Shanghai Velodrome	250 m	wood	Indoor	22
124	2027	France	Saint-Quentin-en-Yvelines (Note: To be held in conjunction with the 2027 UCI Cycling World Championships in Haute Savoie)	Vélodrome de Saint-Quentin-en-Yvelines	250 m	wood	Indoor	22
125	2028	Paraguay	Asunción	Velódromo Olímpico Nacional				
126	2029	United Arab Emirates	Abu Dhabi					
127	2030	Australia	Brisbane	Anna Meares Velodrome	250 m	wood	Indoor	
128	2031	Italy	Trentino (Note: To be held in conjunction with the 2031 UCI Cycling World Championships)					

== All-time medal table ==
Updated after the 2026 World Championships.

Rank	Nation	Gold	Silver	Bronze	Total
1	France	148	128	135	411
2	Netherlands	131	110	98	339
3	Great Britain	130	102	88	320
4	Italy	93	99	108	300
5	Germany	89	83	100	272
6	Australia	87	105	82	274
7	Belgium	58	60	61	179
8	Soviet Union	58	50	35	143
9	United States	53	49	52	154
10	Denmark	39	47	41	127
11	East Germany	34	31	28	93
12	Switzerland	33	34	36	103
13	West Germany	29	31	30	90
14	China	26	25	23	74
15	Russia	24	23	28	75
16	Spain	21	22	16	59
17	Japan	19	20	23	62
18	New Zealand	17	27	32	76
19	Czechoslovakia	14	9	18	41
20	Belarus	14	2	8	24
21	Poland	9	7	9	25
22	Colombia	7	6	3	16
23	Canada	6	20	17	43
24	Austria	5	7	11	23
25	Hong Kong	5	2	4	11
26	Ukraine	4	7	3	14
27	Cuba	4	4	5	13
28	Ireland	4	4	4	12
29	Czech Republic	3	5	7	15
30	Lithuania	2	8	11	21
31	Mexico	2	7	4	13
32	Portugal	2	3	6	11
33	Norway	2	3	5	10
34	Individual Neutral Athletes	2	1	1	4
35	Argentina	1	5	10	16
36	Malaysia	1	2	5	8
37	South Africa	1	2	1	4
38	Russian Cycling Federation	0	2	4	6
39	Luxembourg	0	2	2	4
39	Trinidad and Tobago	0	2	2	4
41	Greece	0	1	2	3
42	Barbados	0	1	1	2
42	South Korea	0	1	1	2
44	Bohemia	0	1	0	1
44	Israel	0	1	0	1
44	Latvia	0	1	0	1
44	Uruguay	0	1	0	1
48	Sweden	0	0	2	2
49	Estonia	0	0	1	1
49	Kazakhstan	0	0	1	1
49	Liechtenstein	0	0	1	1
Totals (51 entries)		1,177	1,163	1,165	3,505

== Most successful athletes ==
Updated after the 2026 World Championships.

=== Men ===
No	Athlete	1st place, gold medalist(s)	2nd place, silver medalist(s)	3rd place, bronze medalist(s)	Total	Years	Events
1	Harrie Lavreysen (NED)	23	3	0	26	2017–2026	1 km time trial, Keirin, Sprint, Team sprint
2	Arnaud Tournant (FRA)	14	3	2	19	1997–2008	1 km time trial, Keirin, Sprint, Team sprint
3	Jeffrey Hoogland (NED)	13	11	1	25	2016–2026	1 km time trial, Keirin, Sprint, Team sprint
4	Chris Hoy (GBR)	11	8	6	25	1999–2012	1 km time trial, Keirin, Sprint, Team sprint
5	Florian Rousseau (FRA)	10	2	4	16	1993–2002	1 km time trial, Sprint, Team sprint
6	Urs Freuler (SUI)	10	0	3	15	1978–1989	Keirin, Points race, Team Pursuit
7	Koichi Nakano (JAP)	10	0	0	10	1977–1986	Sprint
8	Cameron Meyer (AUS)	9	4	2	15	2009–2018	Madison, Points race, Team Pursuit
9	Grégory Baugé (FRA)	9	4	1	14	2006–2019	Sprint, Team sprint
10	Daniel Morelon (FRA)	8	3	5	16	1964–1980	Keirin, Sprint, Tandem

=== Women ===
No	Athlete	1st place, gold medalist(s)	2nd place, silver medalist(s)	3rd place, bronze medalist(s)	Total	Years	Events
1	Anna Meares (AUS)	11	10	6	27	2003–2015	500 m time trial, Keirin, Sprint, Team sprint
2	Kristina Vogel (GER)	11	1	4	16	2012–2018	Keirin, Sprint, Team sprint
3	Félicia Ballanger (FRA)	10	1	0	11	1994–1999	500 m time trial, Sprint
4	Victoria Pendleton (GBR)	9	5	2	16	2005–2012	500 m time trial, Keirin, Sprint, Team sprint
5	Kirsten Wild (NED)	9	4	5	18	2011–2021	Madison, Omnium, Points race, Scratch
6	Sarah Hammer (USA)	8	5	2	15	2006–2017	Individual Pursuit, Omnium, Points race, Team Pursuit
7	Lea Friedrich (GER)	8	4	3	15	2020–2026	500 m time trial, Keirin, Sprint, Team sprint
8	Emma Hinze (GER)	8	1	2	11	2019–2023	500 m time trial, Keirin, Sprint, Team sprint
9	Natalya Tsylinskaya (BLR)	8	1	1	10	2000–2007	500 m time trial, Sprint
10	Chloé Dygert (USA)	8	1	1	10	2016–2025	Individual Pursuit, Team Pursuit

Harrie Lavreysen won the most individual titles with 15. Félicia Ballanger is the female athlete with most individual titles with ten.

Lavreysen is also the only rider to win four gold medals in a single edition, in 2025.

==== Most successful in each event ====
22 Events are held as part of the World championships. The table below summarises the most successful athlete and nation in each of the 22 separate events. The numbers in parentheses represent the number of golds, silvers and bronze respectively won by the athlete or nation in that specific event. Athletes and nations are differentiated in the standard way, first by number of golds, then silvers, then bronze medals.

Event	Men		Women	
Event	Best Male Athlete	Best Nation (male)	Best Female Athlete	Best Nation (female)
Team sprint (men/women)	Arnaud Tournant (FRA) (9/1/0)	France (11/6/6)	Pauline Grabosch (GER) (5/0/1)	Germany (8/0/5)
Sprint (men/women)	Koichi Nakano (JAP) (10/0/0)	France (22/28/35)	Galina Yermolayeva (URS) (6/5/3)	Soviet Union (21/18/9)
Keirin (men/women)	Harrie Lavreysen (NED) (5/0/0)	Netherlands (8/4/5)	Anna Meares (AUS) (3/3/1)	Germany (7/1/3)
Kilo/500m (men/women)	Jeffrey Hoogland (NED) (5/2/0)	France (11/10/8)	Natalya Tsylinskaya (BLR) (5/1/0)	France (6/1/2)
Team pursuit (men/women)	Rasmus Pedersen (DEN) (5/0/2)	Australia (13/3/4)	Laura Kenny (GBR) (4/4/1)	Great Britain (9/6/3)
Individual pursuit (men/women)	Filippo Ganna (ITA) (6/1/2)	Italy (19/13/16)	Tamara Garkuchina (URS) (6/1/0) Rebecca Twigg (USA)	United States (16/9/9)
Points Race (men/women)	Urs Freuler (SUI) (8/0/0)	Switzerland (13/2/0)	Ingrid Haringa (NED) (4/0/0)	Russia (8/5/3)
Scratch race (men/women)	Franco Marvulli (SUI) (2/0/0) Alex Rasmussen (DEN)	France (3/1/2)	Yoanka González (CUB)(3/2/0) Kirsten Wild (NED)	Netherlands (7/5/2)
Omnium (men/women)	Benjamin Thomas (FRA) (3/3/0)	Australia (3/3/2)	Laura Kenny (GBR) (2/3/0)	Great Britain (4/5/0)
Madison (men/women)	Joan Llaneras (ESP) (3/2/0)	France (6/2/0)	Kirsten Wild (NED)(3/1/0) Amy Pieters (NED)	Great Britain (3/1/2)
Elimination (men/women)	Elia Viviani (ITA) (3/1/1)	Italy (3/1/1)	Lotte Kopecky (BEL) (3/2/0)	Belgium (3/2/1)

== Results by country ==
- Argentina
- Australia
- Azerbaijan
- Austria
- Belarus
- Belgium
- Brazil
- Canada
- Chile
- Chinese Taipei
- Colombia
- Cuba
- Denmark
- Finland
- France
- (United Kingdom) Great Britain
- Greece
- Hong Kong
- Hungary
- India
- (Republic of Ireland) Ireland
- Italy
- Japan
- Kazakhstan
- Lithuania
- Malaysia
- Mexico
- Netherlands
- New Zealand
- Poland
- Portugal
- Russia
- Slovakia
- South Africa
- South Korea
- Spain
- Switzerland
- Trinidad and Tobago
- Ukraine
- United States
- Uzbekistan
- Venezuela

== Results by event ==
- UCI Track Cycling World Championships – Men's 1 km time trial
- UCI Track Cycling World Championships – Men's individual pursuit
- UCI Track Cycling World Championships – Men's keirin
- UCI Track Cycling World Championships – Men's madison
- UCI Track Cycling World Championships – Men's omnium
- UCI Track Cycling World Championships – Men's points race
- UCI Track Cycling World Championships – Men's scratch
- UCI Track Cycling World Championships – Men's sprint
- UCI Track Cycling World Championships – Men's team pursuit
- UCI Track Cycling World Championships – Men's team sprint
- UCI Track Cycling World Championships – Men's tandem (defunct)
- UCI Track Cycling World Championships – Women's 500 m time trial
- UCI Track Cycling World Championships – Women's individual pursuit
- UCI Track Cycling World Championships – Women's keirin
- UCI Track Cycling World Championships – Women's madison
- UCI Track Cycling World Championships – Women's omnium
- UCI Track Cycling World Championships – Women's points race
- UCI Track Cycling World Championships – Women's scratch
- UCI Track Cycling World Championships – Women's sprint
- UCI Track Cycling World Championships – Women's team pursuit
- UCI Track Cycling World Championships – Women's team sprint
- UCI Motor-paced World Championships (defunct)

== See also ==
- UCI Track Cycling World Ranking
- UCI Track Cycling World Cup Classics
- UCI Junior Track Cycling World Championships
- UCI Para-cycling Track World Championships
