= 1939 UCI Track Cycling World Championships =

Uci Track Cycling World Championships

- Venue: Milan, Italy
- Date: 26 August - 3 September 1939
- Velodrome: Velodromo Vigorelli
- Events: 2

The 1939 UCI Track Cycling World Championships were the World Championship for track cycling. They took place in Milan, Italy from 26 August to 3 September 1939. Two events for men were contested, one for professionals and one for amateurs.

Due to political events, France withdrew from the competition.

During the competition, the Second World War broke out, which explains why only the amateur individual sprint tournament went ahead to its conclusion. Among the professionals, the sprint final between Belgian Jef Scherens and Arie van Vliet of the Netherlands could not take place and was cancelled. In addition, the individual pursuit, which was to be held officially for the first time (the previous year it had been a demonstration sport), also had to be cancelled.

The race for the bronze medal in the professional category was won by Germany's Albert Richter. About three months later, he was arrested by the Gestapo and killed in Lörrach. Third place in the amateur category went to Berlin's Gerhard Purann, who died in mysterious circumstances as a soldier during the war.

== Medal summary ==
Event	Gold	Silver	Bronze
Men's Professional Events
Men's sprint	Not awarded	Not awarded	Albert Richter; Germany
Men's Amateur Events
Men's sprint	Jan Derksen; Netherlands	Italo Astolfi; Italy	Gerhard Purann; Germany

== Medal table ==
Rank	Nation	Gold	Silver	Bronze	Total
1	Netherlands (NED)	1	0	0	1
2	Italy (ITA)	0	1	0	1
3	Germany (GER)	0	0	2	2
Totals (3 entries)		1	1	2	4

== See also ==
- 1939 UCI Road World Championships
