= 1938 UCI Track Cycling World Championships =

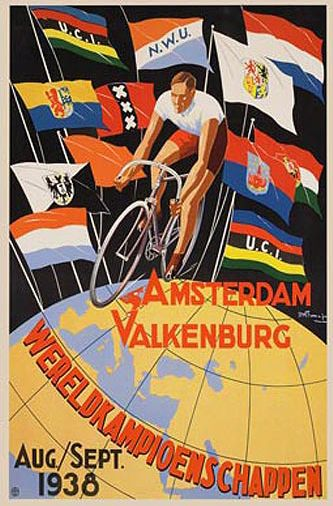
- Venue: Amsterdam, Netherlands
- Date: 27 August - 4 September 1938
- Velodrome: Olympic Stadium
- Events: 3

The 1938 UCI Track Cycling World Championships were the World Championship for track cycling. They took place in Amsterdam, Netherlands from 27 August to 4 September 1938. Three events for men were contested, two for professionals and one for amateurs.

== Medal summary ==
Event	Gold	Silver	Bronze
Men's Professional Events
Men's sprint	Arie van Vliet; Netherlands	Jef Scherens; Belgium	Albert Richter; Germany
Men's motor-paced	Erich Metze; Germany	Walter Lohmann; Germany	Eduardo Severgnini; Italy
Men's Amateur Events
Men's sprint	Johan Van Der Vijver; Netherlands	Bruno Loatti; Italy	Jan Derksen; Netherlands

== Medal table ==
Rank	Nation	Gold	Silver	Bronze	Total
1	Netherlands (NED)	2	0	1	3
2	Germany (GER)	1	1	1	3
3	Italy (ITA)	0	1	1	2
4	Belgium (BEL)	0	1	0	1
Totals (4 entries)		3	3	3	9

== See also ==
- 1938 UCI Road World Championships
