= 1934 UCI Track Cycling World Championships =

Sport competition

- Venue: Leipzig, Germany
- Date: 10–19 August 1934
- Velodrome: Sportplatz Leipzig
- Events: 3

The 1934 UCI Track Cycling World Championships were the World Championship for track cycling. They took place in Leipzig, Germany from 10 to 19 August 1934. Three events for men were contested, two for professionals and one for amateurs.

== Medal summary ==
Event	Gold	Silver	Bronze
Men's Professional Events
Men's sprint	Jef Scherens; Belgium	Albert Richter; Germany	Louis Gérardin; France
Men's motor-paced	Erich Metze; Germany	Paul Krewer; Germany	Eduardo Severgnini; Italy
Men's Amateur Events
Men's sprint	Benedetto Pola; Italy	Arie van Vliet; Netherlands	Christian Lente; France

== Medal table ==
Rank	Nation	Gold	Silver	Bronze	Total
1	Germany (GER)	1	2	0	3
2	Italy (ITA)	1	0	1	2
3	Belgium (BEL)	1	0	0	1
4	Netherlands (NED)	0	1	0	1
5	France (FRA)	0	0	2	2
Totals (5 entries)		3	3	3	9

== See also ==
- 1934 UCI Road World Championships
