= 1935 UCI Track Cycling World Championships =

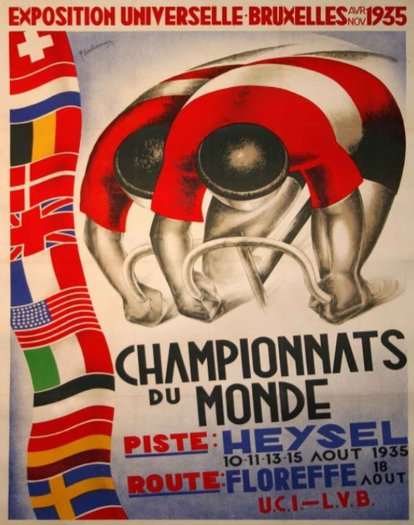
- Venue: Brussels, Belgium
- Date: 10–18 August 1935
- Velodrome: Heysel Stadion
- Events: 3

The 1935 UCI Track Cycling World Championships were the World Championship for track cycling. They took place in Brussels, Belgium from 10 to 18 August 1935. Three events for men were contested, two for professionals and one for amateurs.

== Medal summary ==
| Event | Gold | Silver | Bronze |
|---|---|---|---|
Men's Professional Events
| Men's sprint | Jef Scherens; Belgium | Albert Richter; Germany | Louis Gérardin; France |
| Men's motor-paced | Charles Lacquehay; France | Erich Metze; Germany | Georges Ronsse; Belgium |
Men's Amateur Events
| Men's sprint | Toni Merkens; Germany | Arie van Vliet; Netherlands | Jef van de Vijver; Netherlands |

== Medal table ==
| Rank | Nation | Gold | Silver | Bronze | Total |
|---|---|---|---|---|---|
| 1 | Germany (GER) | 1 | 2 | 0 | 3 |
| 2 | Belgium (BEL) | 1 | 0 | 1 | 2 |
| 2 | France (FRA) | 1 | 0 | 1 | 2 |
| 4 | Netherlands (NED) | 0 | 1 | 1 | 2 |
| Totals (4 entries) | | 3 | 3 | 3 | 9 |

== See also ==
- 1935 UCI Road World Championships
