= Franz Dusika =

Austrian cyclist

Ferry Dusika
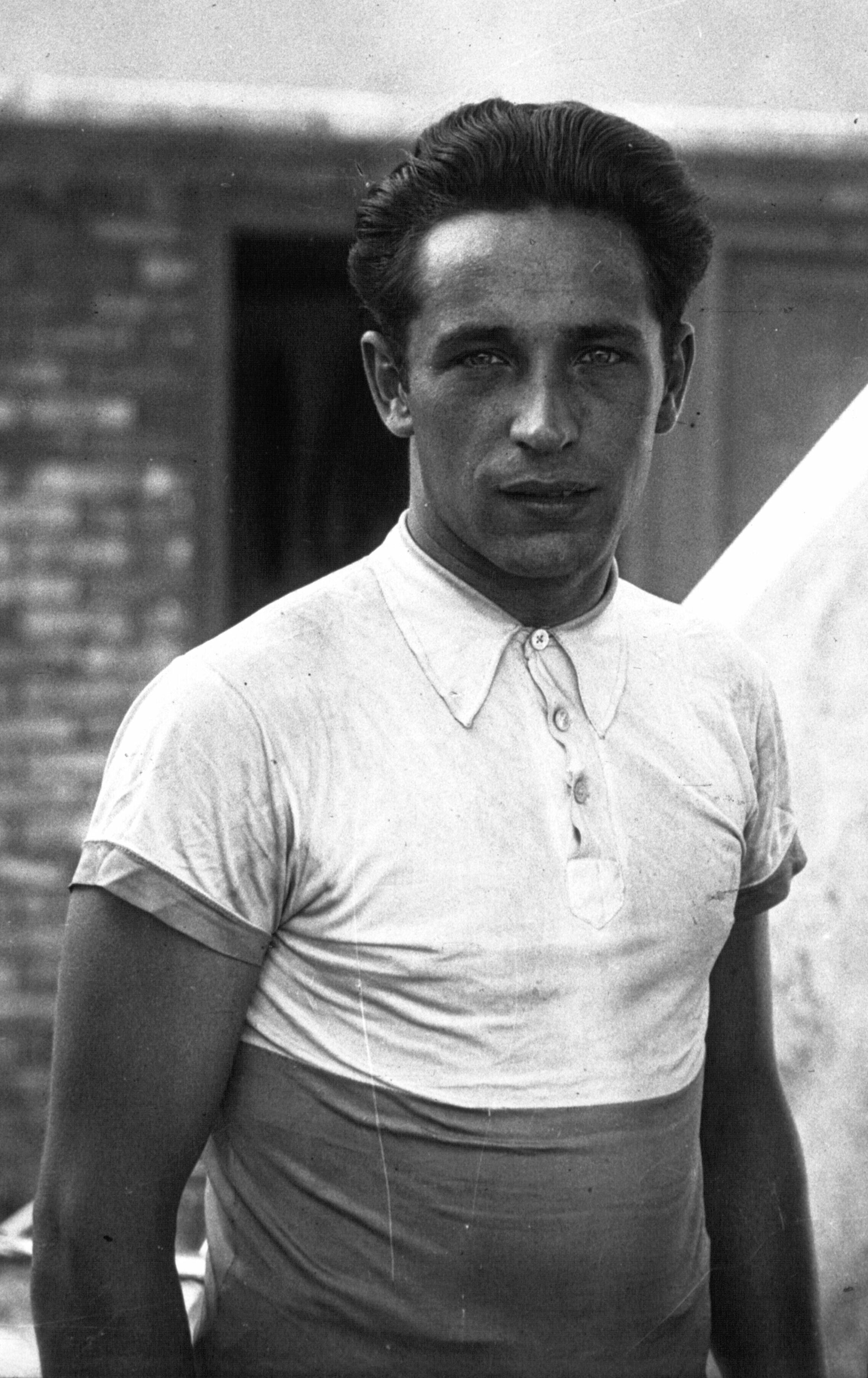
- Dusika in 1933

Personal information
- Born: 31 March 1908 Vienna, Austria
- Died: 12 February 1984 (aged 75) Vienna, Austria

Cycling career
- Sport: Cycling
- Discipline: Track
- Role: Rider
Medal record
Representing Austria
Men's track cycling
World Championships
Bronze medal – third place	1932 Rome	Amateur sprint

Franz "Ferry" Dusika (31 March 1908 – 12 February 1984) was an Austrian cyclist. He competed in two events at the 1928 Summer Olympics and two events at the 1936 Summer Olympics. The Ferry-Dusika-Hallenstadion arena in Vienna is named after him.
