= Perth SpeedDome =

Velodrome in Middle Swan, Australia

- Perth SpeedDome entrance in 2026
- Interactive map of Perth SpeedDome
- Location: Eddie Barron Drive; Middle Swan, Australia
- Coordinates: 31°52′44.36″S 116°1′34.91″E
- Owner: VenuesWest
- Operator: VenuesWest
- Capacity: 1500
- Surface: Siberian pine (250 m or 270 yd)

Construction
- Opened: November 1989
- Architect: Ralph Schürmann
- Project manager: Ron Webb

Website
- SpeedDome

The Perth SpeedDome is a velodrome in Middle Swan, Western Australia, Australia. It is Western Australia's only indoor velodrome. It was designed by German architect Ralph Schürmann and constructed under the supervision of English velodrome specialist Ron Webb. The SpeedDome was opened in November 1989, replacing the Lake Monger Velodrome, an old outdoor concrete velodrome in Mount Hawthorn.

The SpeedDome hosted the 1997 UCI Track Cycling World Championships, as well as the annual Perth International Track Cycling Grand Prix. It regularly hosts training camps for Great Britain, Netherlands, Japan and New Zealand track cycling teams.

The track is 250 metres (820 ft) long and made of high grade Siberian pine. It has seats for 1,500 people with facilities available for up to 2,300 people. In the centre of the cycling track is a multipurpose concrete floor used for inline hockey, figure, speed skating and roller derby. A purpose-built kick boxing gymnasium is located underneath the cycling track. Additional facilities include three media boxes, tenant and administration offices, competitors reception area and competitor and officials change rooms.

The complex also has a 700-metre outdoor criterium track, incorporating a bicycle training facility.

== See also ==
- List of cycling tracks and velodromes

Preceded by Manchester Velodrome; Manchester	UCI Track Cycling World Championships; Venue; 1997	Succeeded by Vélodrome de Bordeaux; Bordeaux
