= Maurice Selbach =

Personal information
- Full name: Maurice Gaetan Selbach
- Born: 12 August 1889 Paris XVII, Ile-de-France, France
- Died: 26 September 1935 (aged 46) London, England, United Kingdom

Cycling career
- Sport: Cycling
- Discipline: Road
- Role: Rider

Amateur team
- 1908–1922: –

Professional team
- 1923: J.B. Louvet - Soly - Dunlop

Maurice Gaetan Selbach (12 August 1889 – 26 September 1935) was an American-British racing cyclist and frame builder.

== Private life ==
Maurice Gaetan Selbach was born in the 17th district of Paris. His father was Oscar Carl Selbach, an American engineer of German descent, and his mother Marguerite Kossakowska. During his childhood the family moved to London, where his father worked as a supplier in the burgeoning automobile sector. In World War I he served in the London Cyclist Battalion. On 23 December 1927 he became a naturalised British citizen, having previously been a citizen of the United States.

== Career ==
Maurice's cycle racing career is believed to have started in 1908/09. For most of his career he was a member of the Unity C.C. He spent a total of 14 years competing in the sport. In 1923 he rode and finished Paris - Roubaix.

== Selbach cycles ==
After a successful career, Selbach set up a business as a cycle manufacturer in London. His bikes distinguished themselves by the high level of technological innovation in its designs.

The quality of his frames were recognised by some of the greatest cyclists of the time, like Harry Grant, who broke the World Motor-paced One Hour Record using a Selbach frame, and Albert Richter, who won the 1932 Amateur World Sprint Championship.

== Death and business closure ==
In September 1935, while cycling on his way to work, Selbach tried to overtake a truck. Bad road conditions caused him to crash and landed him under the truck's wheels. He died on the way to the hospital. A few years later, in 1939, the Selbach business was closed and its trade name sold.

== Racing palmares & records ==
Fastest time in 50 mile time trial (8x)
Fastest time in 100 mile time trial (5x)
1st in 12 hour road race (5x)
1st in 24 hour road race (3x)
1919
Fastest time Anfield B.C. 100
1920
Best on record in 100 mile (tandem) - 4h27'50" (RRA recognised)
1921
London to Bath and back record - 11h55'30" (RRA recognised)
1922
24 hour unpaced record - 337.5 miles (RRA recognised)
1923
Land's End to London record - 17h47'00" (RRA recognised)
