= 1936 UCI Track Cycling World Championships =

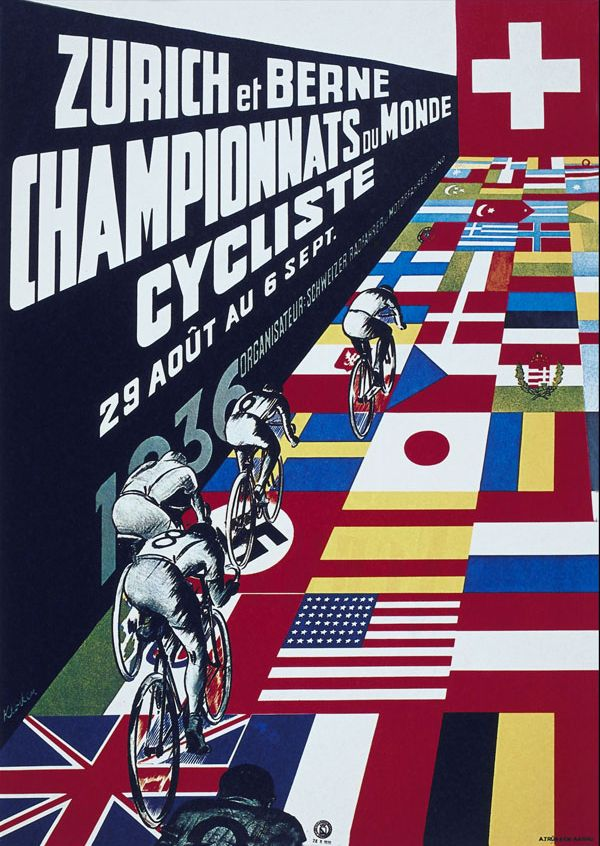
- Venue: Zurich, Switzerland
- Date: 28 August - 6 September 1936
- Velodrome: Oerlikon Velodrome
- Events: 3

The 1936 UCI Track Cycling World Championships were the World Championship for track cycling. They took place in Zürich, Switzerland from 28 August to 6 September 1936. Three events for men were contested, two for professionals and one for amateurs.

== Medal summary ==
| Event | Gold | Silver | Bronze |
|---|---|---|---|
Men's Professional Events
| Men's sprint | Jef Scherens; Belgium | Louis Gérardin; France | Albert Richter; Germany |
| Men's motor-paced | André Raynaud; France | Charles Lacquehay; France | Georges Ronsse; Belgium |
Men's Amateur Events
| Men's sprint | Arie van Vliet; Netherlands | Pierre Georget; France | Henri Collard; Belgium |

== Medal table ==
| Rank | Nation | Gold | Silver | Bronze | Total |
|---|---|---|---|---|---|
| 1 | France (FRA) | 1 | 3 | 0 | 4 |
| 2 | Belgium (BEL) | 1 | 0 | 2 | 3 |
| 3 | Netherlands (NED) | 1 | 0 | 0 | 1 |
| 4 | Germany (GER) | 0 | 0 | 1 | 1 |
| Totals (4 entries) | | 3 | 3 | 3 | 9 |

== See also ==
- 1936 UCI Road World Championships
