= 1937 UCI Track Cycling World Championships =

- Venue: Copenhagen, Denmark
- Date: 21–29 August 1937
- Velodrome: Ordrupbanen
- Events: 3

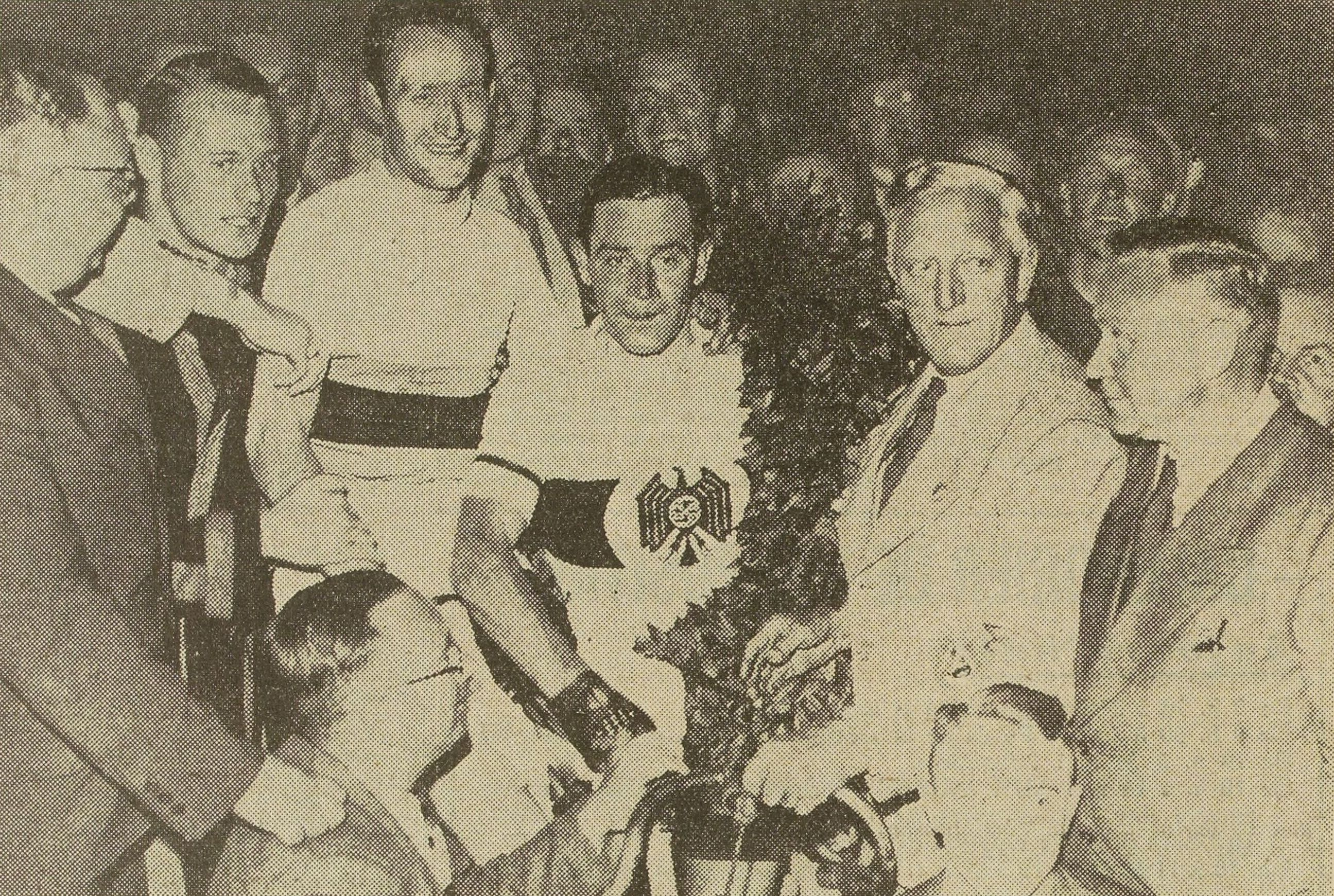
Celebrations at the Ordrup velodrome after Walter Lohmann's victory in the professional's motor-paced event.

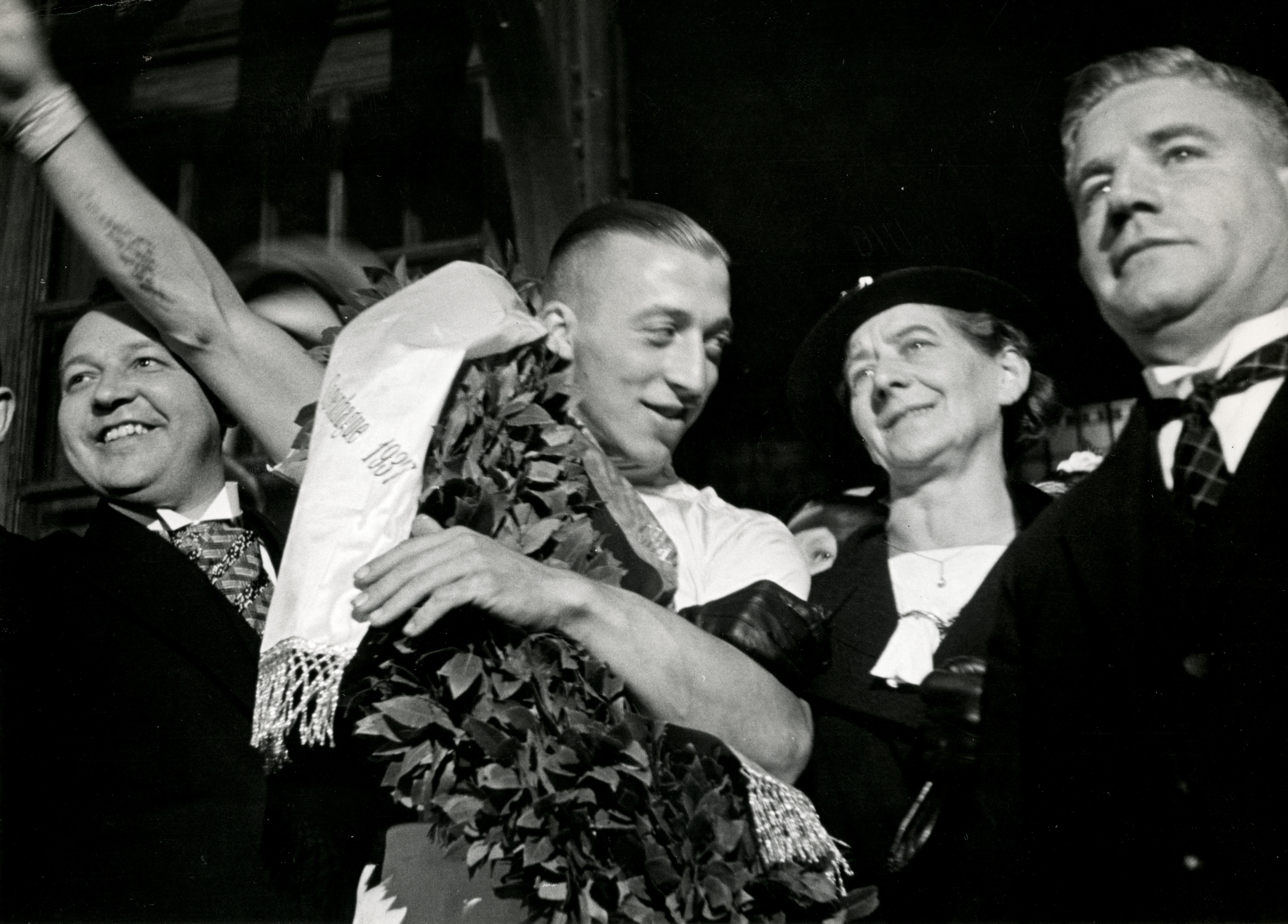
Amateur cycling champion Johan van der Vijver is honored in his hometown of Roosendaal.

The 1937 UCI Track Cycling World Championships were the World Championship for track cycling. They took place in Copenhagen, Denmark from 21 to 29 August 1937. Three events for men were contested, two for professionals and one for amateurs.

== Medal summary ==
Event	Gold	Silver	Bronze
Men's Professional Events
Men's sprint	Jef Scherens; Belgium	Arie van Vliet; Netherlands	Albert Richter; Germany
Men's motor-paced	Walter Lohmann; Germany	Ernest Terreau; France	Adolf Schön; Germany
Men's Amateur Events
Men's sprint	Johan van der Vijver; Netherlands	Pierre Georget; France	Hendrik Ooms; Netherlands

== Medal table ==
Rank	Nation	Gold	Silver	Bronze	Total
1	Netherlands (NED)	1	1	1	3
2	Germany (GER)	1	0	2	3
3	Belgium (BEL)	1	0	0	1
4	France (FRA)	0	2	0	2
Totals (4 entries)		3	3	3	9

== See also ==
- 1937 UCI Road World Championships
