= 2027 UCI Track Cycling World Championships =

- Venue: Saint-Quentin-en-Yvelines, France
- Date: 26–30 August
- Velodrome: Vélodrome National
- Events: 22

The 2027 UCI Track Cycling World Championships will be the 124th edition of the UCI Track Cycling World Championships and held from 26 to 30 August 2027, at the Vélodrome National in Saint-Quentin-en-Yvelines, France.

== Medal summary ==
Events with a grey background are non-Olympic events.

=== Men ===
Event	Gold	Silver	Bronze
Individual pursuit			
Team pursuit			
Sprint			
Team sprint			
Keirin			
Madison			
Omnium			
Scratch			
Points race			
Elimination			
1 km time trial			

=== Women ===
Event	Gold	Silver	Bronze
Individual pursuit			
Team pursuit			
Sprint			
Team sprint			
Keirin			
Madison			
Omnium			
Scratch			
Points race			
Elimination			
1 km time trial			
