= Jef Scherens =

Belgian cyclist

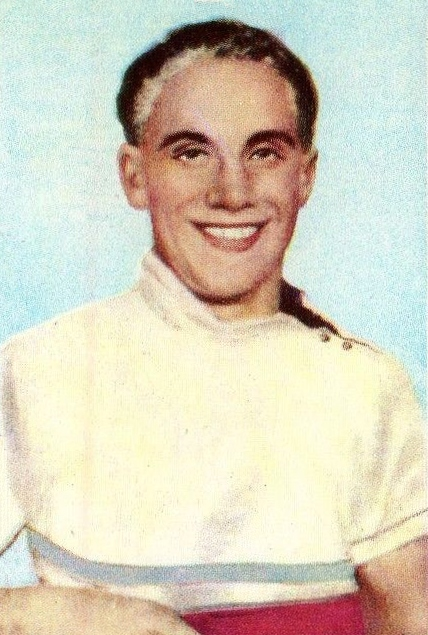

Personal information
- Full name: Joseph Scherens
- Nickname: Poeske Scherens
- Born: 17 February 1909 Werchter, Belgium
- Died: 9 August 1986 (aged 77) Leuven, Belgium

Cycling career
- Sport: Cycling
- Discipline: Track
- Role: Rider
- Rider type: Sprint

Major wins
- National Track Championships Sprint (1931, 1932, 1933, 1934, 1935, 1936, 1937, 1938, 1939, 1941, 1942, 1944, 1945, 1946, 1947) World Track Championships Sprint (1932, 1933, 1934, 1935, 1936, 1937, 1947)
Medal record
Representing Belgium
Men's track cycling
World Championships
Gold medal – first place	1932 Rome	Sprint
Gold medal – first place	1933 Paris	Sprint
Gold medal – first place	1934 Leipzig	Sprint
Gold medal – first place	1935 Brussels	Sprint
Gold medal – first place	1936 Zürich	Sprint
Gold medal – first place	1937 Copenhagen	Sprint
Gold medal – first place	1947 Paris	Sprint
Silver medal – second place	1938 Amsterdam	Sprint
Bronze medal – third place	1931 Copenhagen	Sprint

Joseph "Jef" Scherens (17 February 1909 – 9 August 1986), better known as Poeske Scherens, was a Belgian professional track cyclist, specializing in sprint where he won seven World Championships.

== Biography ==
=== Early life ===
Jef Scherens was born in Werchter, the fifth child of the Felix Scherens-Regina Janssens family. Little Jef soon became 'Jefke', but also 'Poeterke'. In the Hageland, that was a name for a little goat or lamb that did not grow well. His fellow street rabble-rousers first distorted it into 'Poeter', which later became 'Poeske' (Flemish for "small cat"). When Jef Scherens later turned out to be a very fast sprinter with a cat-like final jump, that nickname was given existence.

From the age of five until the end of WWI, young Jef stayed with his family near Bordeaux, where he learned to speak French. At the end of primary school, the Committee for Vocational Orientation recommended that Jefke would go to work. So it happened: Jef worked in a leather factory and cycled up and down to Zaventem every day in group. That gave him the idea of trying out as a cyclist. His brother Giel, who was one year older, competed in the rookies. With one of his two racing bikes, Jef made his debut in a race in Betekom in 1926. That same year he won six victories and numerous places of honour. In 1927, he joined the Leuven Stoempersclub and won forty races in the newcomers' category. Because of the many successes, he decided to quit his job and put everything on cycling. The following year, he won 27 times among the juniors. In particular, his sprinting skills came to the fore.

=== Professional career ===
His qualities as a sprinter did not go unnoticed and the team's president Edward Van Hove, offered him a contract to compete in a sprint competition at the Brussels Sports Palace. On 14 October 1928, Scherens won against the then Belgian champion Jules Vervust. All connoisseurs were then convinced they had discovered a new champion.

In 1929, he won five road races. That year, he did his military service and was granted the privilege of training at certain times. A fall in 1930 kept him in bed for seven weeks.

In 1931, he made a comeback and became Belgian champion in the professional category. Between 1931 and 1947, he won the Belgian individual sprit championship 15 times.

In 1932, Scherens competed in the world championship in Rome and faced the Frenchman Lucien Michard in the final. Their duel lasted more than 20 minutes, however, so the jury decided to draw lots to see which of the two would go first. Michard was chosen and Scherens, with his famous spurt, won the title of world champion. He was celebrated in Leuven, where he had lived since 1930. He subsequently won the world track championships five times: in 1933 in Paris, in 1934 in Leipzig, in 1935 in Brussels, in 1936 in Zurich and in 1937 in Copenhagen. In July 1938, he had a serious fall during the Paris Grand Prix at the Cipale2. Not yet fully recovered from his fall, he lost his title to the Dutchman Arie van Vliet.

Van Vliet and Scherens met again a year later in the final in Milan and both fell. The final was postponed. The next day, the Second World War broke out and the championship was cancelled.

After a six-year break, the world championships were held again in Zurich in 1946. Scherens lost to the Frenchman Georges Senfftleben. The following year, he managed to win a seventh and final title in Paris.

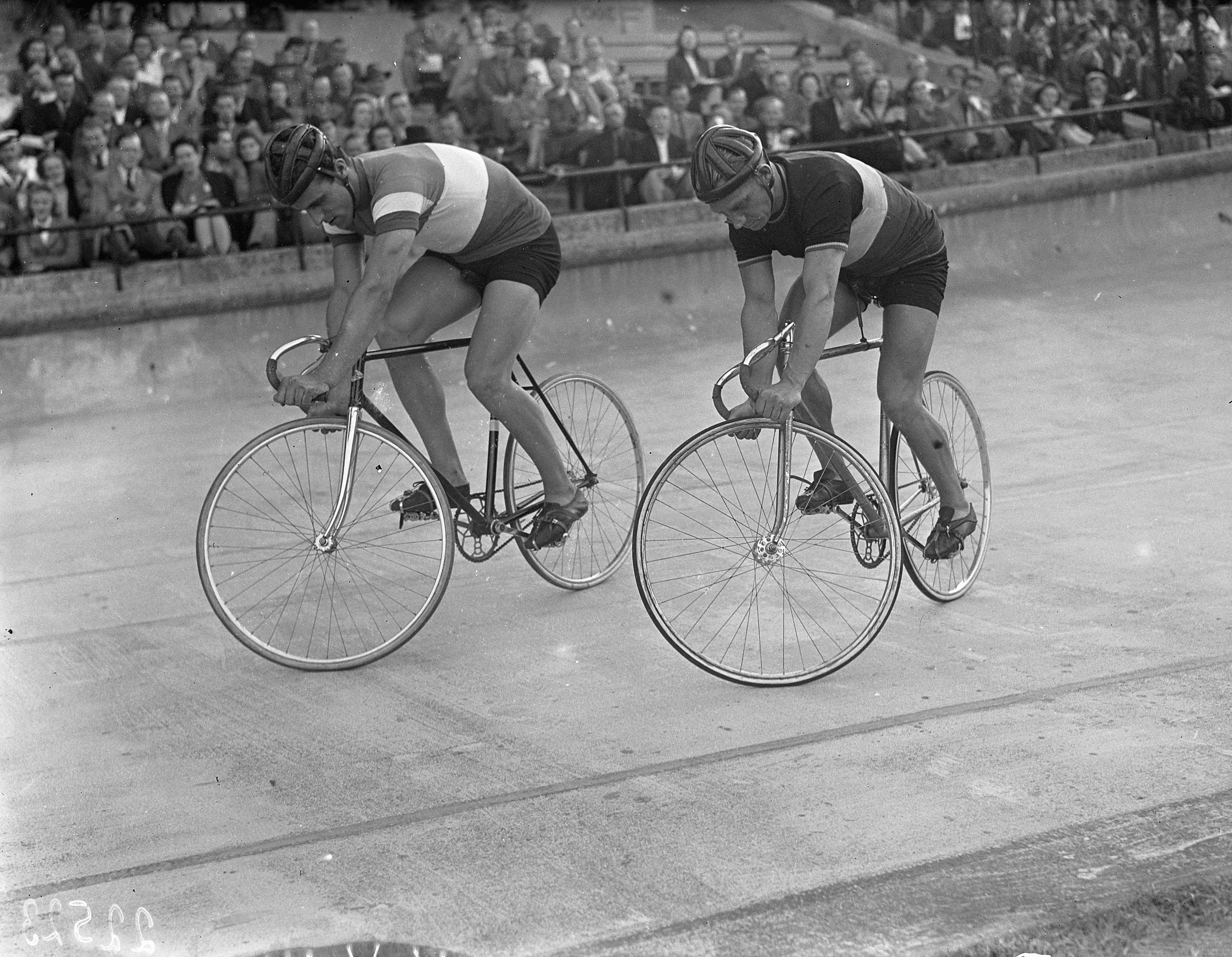
1947 Grand Prix of Amsterdam, Scherens balancing next to Georges Senfftleben

Scherens also won numerous Grand Prix in various countries, breaking records at all the major velodromes in Europe. In 1933, he was awarded the Belgian National Sports Merit Award.

Since 1963, the Grote Prijs Jef Scheren has been held in his honour in Leuven, the place where he died in 1986.

== Major results ==
1929
1st Sprint, Independent Belgian National Championships
1930
3rd Sprint Belgian National Championships
1931
1st Sprint Belgian National Championships
1st Grand Prix d'Angers
1st Grand Prix de la République
1st Grand Prix de Cholet
3rd Sprint, UCI Track World Championships, Copenhagen
1932
1st Sprint, UCI Track World Championships, Rome
1st Sprint Belgian National Championships
1st Grand Prix de Paris
1st Amsterdam Grand Prix
1st Berlin Grand Prix
1st Brussels Grand Prix
1st Copenhagen Grand Prix
1st Grand Prix de Tours
2nd Grand Prix de l'UVF
1933
1st Sprint, UCI Track World Championships, Paris
1st Sprint Belgian National Championships
1st Grand Prix de l'UVF
1st Grand Prix de Paris
1st Grand Prix d'Europe
1st Grand Prix d'Alger
1st Grand Prix d'Angers
1st Grand Prix d'Europe
1st Grand Prix de Paris
1934
1st Sprint, UCI Track World Championships, Leipzig
1st Sprint Belgian National Championships
1st Grand Prix de l'UVF
1st Grand Prix de Lorient
1st Copenhagen Grand Prix
1st Grand Prix de Lyon
1st Grand Prix de Roanne
1935
1st Sprint, UCI Track World Championships, Brussels
1st Sprint Belgian National Championships
1st Grand Prix de Reims (fr)
1st Grand Prix d'Europe
1st Grand Prix de Brest
1st Grand Prix de Lorient
1st Milan Grand Prix
3rd Grand Prix de l'UVF
1936
1st Sprint, UCI Track World Championships, Zürich
1st Sprint Belgian National Championships
1st Grand Prix de Genève
1st Copenhagen Grand Prix
1st Cologne Grand Prix
1st Grand Prix de Lorient
1st Zürich Grand Prix
2nd Grand Prix de Paris
2nd Grand Prix de l'UVF
3rd Grand Prix de Reims (fr)
1937
1st Sprint, UCI Track World Championships, Copenhagen
1st Sprint Belgian National Championships
1st Grand Prix de Paris
1st Grand Prix de Turin (fr)
1st Antwerp Grand Prix
1st Berlin Grand Prix
1st Copenhagen Grand Prix
1st London Grand Prix
1st Milan Grand Prix
1st Grand Prix de Paris
3rd Grand Prix de l'UVF
1938
1st Sprint Belgian National Championships
1st London Grand Prix
1st Milan Grand Prix
2nd Sprint, UCI Track World Championships, Amsterdam
2nd Grand Prix de l'UVF
2nd Copenhagen Grand Prix
1939
1st Sprint Belgian National Championships
1st Copenhagen Grand Prix
1940
2nd Sprint Belgian National Championships
2nd Six Days of Brussels (with Achiel Bruneel)
1941
1st Sprint Belgian National Championships
1st Ghent Grand Prix
1st Grand Prix de Bordeaux
2nd Schaarbeek
1942
1st Sprint Belgian National Championships
1st Grand Prix de l'UVF
3rd Grand Prix de Paris
1943

1st Ghent Grand Prix

2nd Sprint Belgian National Championships
2nd Grand Prix de Paris
1944
1st Sprint Belgian National Championships
1945
1st Sprint Belgian National Championships
1st Zürich Grand Prix
1946
1st Sprint Belgian National Championships
1st Copenhagen Grand Prix
1st Grand Prix de Bruxelles
3rd Grand Prix de Paris
1947
1st Sprint Belgian National Championships, Paris
1949
1st Grand Prix de Paris
2nd Sprint Belgian National Championships
3rd 1km Sprint European Track Championships
1950
3rd Sprint Belgian National Championships

== Honours ==
- Officer in the Belgian Order of Leopold II: 1933
- Belgian National Sports Merit Award: 1933
- Grote Prijs Jef Scherens: from 1963
- UCI Hall of Fame: 2002
- A road, Jef Scherensstraat in Rotselaar
