= August Lehr =

German bicycle racer

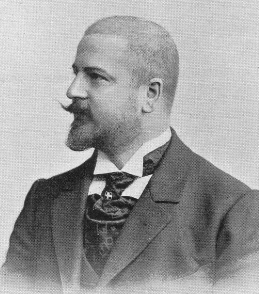
August Lehr

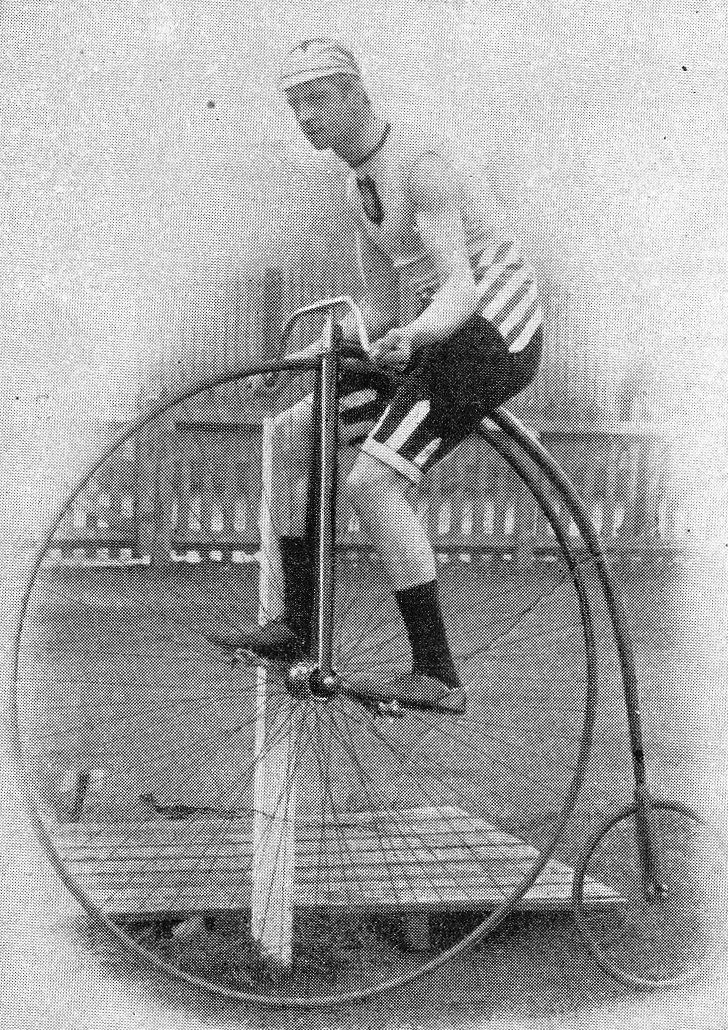
Lehr in 1889

August Lehr (1871–1921) was a German racing cyclist.

Lehr was born on 26 February 1871 in Frankfurt am Main. Lehr, who was a salesman by profession, started his career as an amateur cyclist on a penny-farthing or ordinary. From 1888 to 1894 he won the German championship seven times. In 1888, only 17 years old, Lehr won in England, in the "belly of the beast", the English championship in the ordinary category (the unofficial world championship for over one English mile). In 1891 he was the best cyclist in the world according to wins accumulated. In 1893 he decided to change to the safety bicycle, which caused him to win the 1894 ICA Track Cycling World Championships in Antwerp, becoming the first German world champion in track cycling. As a result of these successes Lehr received invitations to race all over Europe, leading him to a total of 260 career wins (according to other sources 227). However, his wins didn't prove enough to make a living. In 1898, he retired from his active racing career.

In 1909, the popular sports figure gave the start sign for the first Six Days of Berlin. In 1921, Lehr suffered gastrointestinal bleeding during a rowing trip on the Mecklenburg Lake Plateau, as a result of which he died a few days later.

When in 1925 the Waldstadion was constructed next to a 400-meter velodrome in Lehr's hometown Frankfurt, the brothers Adam and Fritz von Opel financed the erection of a bronze memorial (by Emil Hub) in his honour. In 2005, during the renovation of the Waldstadions for the FIFA World Cup, the memorial was destroyed.

He died 15 July 1921 in Ludwigslust.

== Literature ==
- Hans Borowik: 300 Rennfahrer in einem Band, Berlin 1937.
- Adolf Klimanschewsky: Der entfesselte Weltmeister, Berlin 1955.
- Helmer Boelsen: Die Geschichte der Rad-Weltmeisterschaft, Bielefeld 2007 ISBN 978-3-936973-33-4.
