= Harry Grant (cyclist) =

British racing cyclist

Personal information
- Born: 1906 United Kingdom
- Died: 1993 (aged 86–87)

Cycling career
- Sport: Cycling
- Current team: Retired
- Discipline: Motor paced rider
- Role: Rider
- Rider type: All-rounder

Amateur teams
- –: Imperial Wheelers,
- –: Norwood Paragon CC
- –: Colchester Rovers

Professional team
- 1932–1938+: –

Major wins
- 1926, 1928, 1931 - UK tandem-paced national amateur champion 1929 British one-mile flying start paced record 1932 - World motor-paced professional one-hour record x 3; 1938 - Cent Milles 100-mile race in Paris

Harry Grant, holder of the hour record for motor-paced cycling

Harry Grant (1906-1993) was a British racing cyclist who specialised in motor-paced events. He was national amateur champion in 1926, 1928 and 1931. At the time he turned professional in 1932 he held four British amateur track records. He also won many races on the continent and held the world paced one-hour record on three occasions.

== Early life ==
Grant was born in Colchester, Essex, and raised in London.

== Cycling career ==
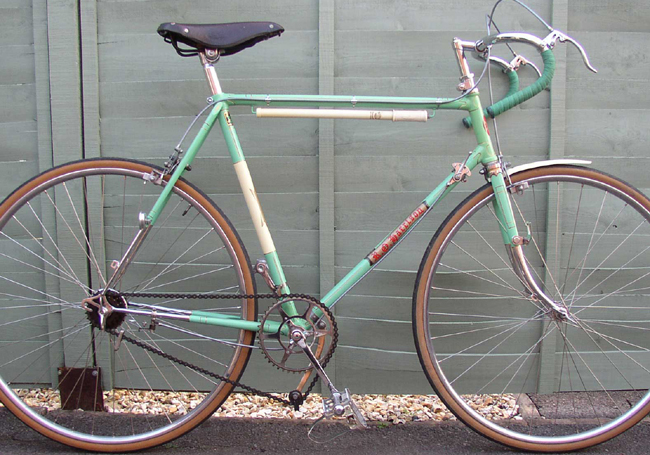
The "Harry Grant" Super Circuit, a model produced in 1938 by R. O. Harrison.

He belonged to the Imperial Wheelers and won the national 50-miles tandem-paced championship in 1926, 1928 and 1931. In 1929 he established the British one-mile flying start paced record at 1m 17.6s and the standing start record at 1m 29.8s.

He turned professional in 1932 and went to Paris, where he teamed up with the Belgian pacer, Leon Vanderstuyft. In July 1932 he made a successful attempt on the world one-hour motor-paced record when, trailed by Vanderstuyft, he covered 52 miles 215 yards. This record was beaten 24 hours later and in October 1932 Grant put up new figures of 55 miles 362 yards. Twelve hours later this was beaten but Grant recaptured it the following day when he covered 56 miles 929 yards. He won the Cent Milles 100-mile race in Paris in 1938.

In Britain he took the professional one-mile standing start paced record with 1 m 35.8 s.

Grant's sponsors included British bicycle makers such as R. O. Harrison and Maurice Selbach. It was on a Selbach that Grant took the world one-hour record. Harrison named his top model after him.

In the late 1940s, Grant was riding in the colours of the south London Norwood Paragon cycling club at the Herne Hill Velodrome.

In later life, Grant returned to Colchester, where he joined Colchester Rovers cycling club. He marked his 80th birthday in 1986 by taking part in the 100 km Windmill Ride, after which ride organisers presented him with a commemorative medal.

== Death and commemoration ==
Grant died in West Bergholt, near Colchester, in March 1993. He was aged 86.

=== The Golden Book ===
Grant's achievements were celebrated in 1932 when Cycling Weekly awarded him his own page in the Golden Book of Cycling.
