= 2016 UCI Track Cycling World Championships – Men's sprint =

Men's sprint at the 2016 UCI Track Cycling World Championships
- Venue: Lee Valley VeloPark, London
- Date: 4–5 March
- Competitors: 34 from 21 nations

Medalists
gold medal	Jason Kenny	Great Britain
silver medal	Matthew Glaetzer	Australia
bronze medal	Denis Dmitriev	Russia

The Men's sprint event of the 2016 UCI Track Cycling World Championships was held on 4 and 5 March 2016. Jason Kenny of Great Britain won the gold medal, beating Matthew Glaetzer of Australia in the final.

== Results ==
=== Qualifying ===
The qualifying was started at 09:00.

Rank	Name	Nation	Time	Behind	Notes
1	Matthew Glaetzer	Australia	9.766		Q
2	Jason Kenny	Great Britain	9.767	+0.001	Q
3	Jeffrey Hoogland	Netherlands	9.767	+0.001	Q
4	Denis Dmitriev	Russia	9.791	+0.025	Q
5	Callum Skinner	Great Britain	9.824	+0.058	Q
6	Max Niederlag	Germany	9.868	+0.102	Q
7	Damian Zieliński	Poland	9.876	+0.110	Q
8	Grégory Baugé	France	9.891	+0.125	Q
9	Sam Webster	New Zealand	9.907	+0.141	Q
10	Fabián Puerta	Colombia	9.927	+0.161	Q
11	Eddie Dawkins	New Zealand	9.939	+0.173	Q
12	Xu Chao	China	9.961	+0.195	Q
13	Kamil Kuczyński	Poland	9.967	+0.201	Q
14	Njisane Phillip	Trinidad and Tobago	9.969	+0.203	Q
15	Nikita Shurshin	Russia	9.983	+0.217	Q
16	Pavel Kelemen	Czech Republic	9.986	+0.220	Q
17	Hugo Barrette	Canada	9.992	+0.226	Q
18	Sándor Szalontay	Hungary	9.997	+0.231	Q
19	Quentin Lafargue	France	10.008	+0.242	Q
20	Seiichiro Nakagawa	Japan	10.018	+0.252	Q
21	Maximilian Levy	Germany	10.032	+0.266	Q
22	François Pervis	France	10.035	+0.269	Q
23	Jair Tjon En Fa	Suriname	10.036	+0.270	Q
24	Theo Bos	Netherlands	10.047	+0.281	Q
25	Patrick Constable	Australia	10.054	+0.288	
26	Jacob Schmid	Australia	10.060	+0.294	
27	Juan Peralta	Spain	10.064	+0.298	
28	Azizulhasni Awang	Malaysia	10.084	+0.318	
29	Andriy Vynokurov	Ukraine	10.090	+0.324	
30	Santiago Ramírez	Colombia	10.094	+0.328	
31	Adam Ptáčník	Czech Republic	10.158	+0.392	
32	Bao Saifei	China	10.194	+0.428	
33	Eoin Mullen	Ireland	10.198	+0.432	
34	Kang Dong-jin	South Korea	10.332	+0.566	

=== 1/16 finals ===
The 1/16 finals were held at 10:09.

Heat	Rank	Name	Nation	Gap	Notes
1	1	Matthew Glaetzer	Australia		Q
1	2	Theo Bos	Netherlands	+0.117	
2	1	Jason Kenny	Great Britain		Q
2	2	Jair Tjon En Fa	Suriname	+0.045	
3	1	Jeffrey Hoogland	Netherlands		Q
3	2	François Pervis	France	+0.534	
4	1	Denis Dmitriev	Russia		Q
4	2	Maximilian Levy	Germany	+0.066	
5	1	Callum Skinner	Great Britain		Q
5	2	Seiichiro Nakagawa	Japan	+0.101	
6	1	Max Niederlag	Germany		Q
6	2	Quentin Lafargue	France	+0.049	
7	1	Damian Zieliński	Poland		Q
7	2	Sándor Szalontay	Hungary	+0.072	
8	1	Grégory Baugé	France		Q
8	2	Hugo Barrette	Canada	+0.011	
9	1	Sam Webster	New Zealand		Q
9	2	Pavel Kelemen	Czech Republic	+0.109	
10	1	Fabián Puerta	Colombia		Q
10	2	Nikita Shurshin	Russia	+0.017	
11	1	Eddie Dawkins	New Zealand		Q
11	2	Njisane Phillip	Trinidad and Tobago	+0.030	
12	1	Xu Chao	China		Q
12	2	Kamil Kuczyński	Poland	+0.053	

=== 1/8 finals ===
The 1/8 finals were held at 11:41.

Heat	Rank	Name	Nation	Gap	Notes
1	1	Matthew Glaetzer	Australia		Q
1	2	Xu Chao	China	+0.060	
2	1	Jason Kenny	Great Britain		Q
2	2	Eddie Dawkins	New Zealand	+2.559	
3	1	Fabián Puerta	Colombia		Q
3	2	Jeffrey Hoogland	Netherlands	+0.130	
4	1	Denis Dmitriev	Russia		Q
4	2	Sam Webster	New Zealand	+0.011	
5	1	Callum Skinner	Great Britain		Q
5	2	Grégory Baugé	France	+0.033	
6	1	Damian Zieliński	Poland		Q
6	2	Max Niederlag	Germany	+0.047	

=== 1/8 finals repechage ===
1/8 finals repechage was held at 12:08.

Heat	Rank	Name	Nation	Gap	Notes
1	1	Sam Webster	New Zealand		Q
1	2	Max Niederlag	Germany	+0.141	
1	3	Xu Chao	China	+0.450	
2	1	Grégory Baugé	France		Q
2	2	Jeffrey Hoogland	Netherlands	+0.037	
2	3	Eddie Dawkins	New Zealand	+0.889	

=== Quarterfinals ===
The Quarterfinals were started at 14:45.

Heat	Rank	Name	Nation	Race 1	Race 2	Decider	Notes
1	1	Matthew Glaetzer	Australia	X	X		Q
1	2	Grégory Baugé	France	+0.056	+0.459		
2	1	Jason Kenny	Great Britain	X	X		Q
2	2	Sam Webster	New Zealand	+0.112	+0.214		
3	1	Damian Zieliński	Poland	X	X		Q
3	2	Fabián Puerta	Colombia	+0.018	+0.191		
4	1	Denis Dmitriev	Russia	X	+0.020	X	Q
4	2	Callum Skinner	Great Britain	+0.077	X	+0.028	

=== Race for 5th–8th places ===
The race for 5th–8th places was held at 17:00.

Rank	Name	Nation	Gap
5	Fabián Puerta	Colombia	
6	Grégory Baugé	France	+0.016
7	Sam Webster	New Zealand	+0.125
8	Callum Skinner	Great Britain	+0.206

=== Semifinals ===
The semifinals were started at 19:00.

Heat	Rank	Name	Nation	Race 1	Race 2	Decider	Notes
1	1	Matthew Glaetzer	Australia	X	X		Q
1	2	Denis Dmitriev	Russia	+0.083	+0.010		
2	1	Jason Kenny	Great Britain	X	X		Q
2	2	Damian Zieliński	Poland	+0.156	+0.067		

=== Finals ===
The finals were started at 21:03.

Rank	Name	Nation	Race 1	Race 2	Decider
Gold Medal Races
1st place, gold medalist(s)	Jason Kenny	Great Britain	+0.002	X	X
2nd place, silver medalist(s)	Matthew Glaetzer	Australia	X	+0.060	+0.050
Bronze Medal Races
3rd place, bronze medalist(s)	Denis Dmitriev	Russia	X	X	
4	Damian Zieliński	Poland	+0.072	+0.039	
