= Zurenborg Velodrome =

Cycling track in Zurenborg, Antwerp, Belgium

Velodroom van Zurenborg
- Poster to the 1894 national and world track cycling championships

- Location within Belgium
- Address: Velodroomstraat
- Location: Antwerp
- Coordinates: 51°12′12″N 04°25′34″E
- Operator: Emile De Beukelaer, Ernest Jacobs
- Capacity: 10,000–12,000
- Surface: Cement (1894–1904); Wood (1904–1910)
- Field size: 400m length

Construction
- Opened: 14 August 1894
- Closed: 1910
- Years active: 1893–1909

Velodroom Zurenborg was a cycling track in the Zurenborg area in Antwerp, Belgium. The facility existed from 1894 to 1910 and the length of the cycling track was 400 m. It hosted the world track cycling championships in 1894 and 1905.

== History ==
In 1894, the World Exposition was being organized in Antwerp, which also included a cycling congress and competition. This was the impetus for the creation of a new velodrome in the city. On 18 January 1894, the public limited company Société Anonyme Vélodrome d'Anvers was founded and succeeded in getting the cycling track built. The facility was officially opened in May 1894. It was built on the Zurenborg estate, on land leased from a local company building housing in the area. The arena was equipped with a 400-metre cycling track and two covered grandstands, in addition to which there were also several thousand uncovered standing places.

In August 1894, the track hosted the second edition of the world amateur track cycling championships, organized as part of the ongoing World Exposition in the city. The construction of the track proved to be a successful idea and it was frequently used, not only for cycling competitions, but also for other sporting events. The construction company was particularly pleased with the new arena, for which the facility was an excellent advertisement for the area.

In the following years of the circuit's operation, the main cycling event held at the velodrome was the Grand Prix d'Anvers, organized on the occasion of the town fete. In return for giving the public free entry, the organizers of the competition received subsidies from the city to run it. Also different national track cycling championships were organized in the velodrome.

The very first game of the Belgian national football competition (Antwerp F.C.-Sporting Club Bruxelles) was played on an area next to the track on November 10, 1895. Between 1897 and 1903, Antwerp F.C. played their matches on the pitch inside the track. In winter, an ice rink was organized here.

In July 1905, the world track cycling championships were held on the track for the second time.

In the Belle Époque, Zurenborg's popularity was on par with world-renowned cycling arenas like Parc des Princes in Paris and Madison Square Garden in New York. Many famous cyclists were active there: the French Edmond Jacquelin, the African-American sensation Major Taylor, and numerous others.

On 1 October 1905, the contract for the lease of the grounds expired. It was henceforth renewed for shorter periods, but it became clear that in the near future a construction company would want to build more residential buildings on the site. As early as 1905, the position of the entrance gate was changed, bringing it closer to the velodrome to make room for the construction of new flats. The building was finally closed and demolished in 1910. Housing was subsequently built in its place, and one of the streets that passes through the site of the former track is named "Velodroomstraat".

In 1911, a new cycling track was opened at Apollostraat, about a kilometer to the west. It was also called 'Zurenborg', although it was located on a different area. However, the facility was quickly decommissioned during the First World War.

== See also ==
- Garden City Velodrome
- List of cycling tracks and velodromes
