= Ferry-Dusika-Hallenstadion =

Former indoor arena in Vienna, Austria

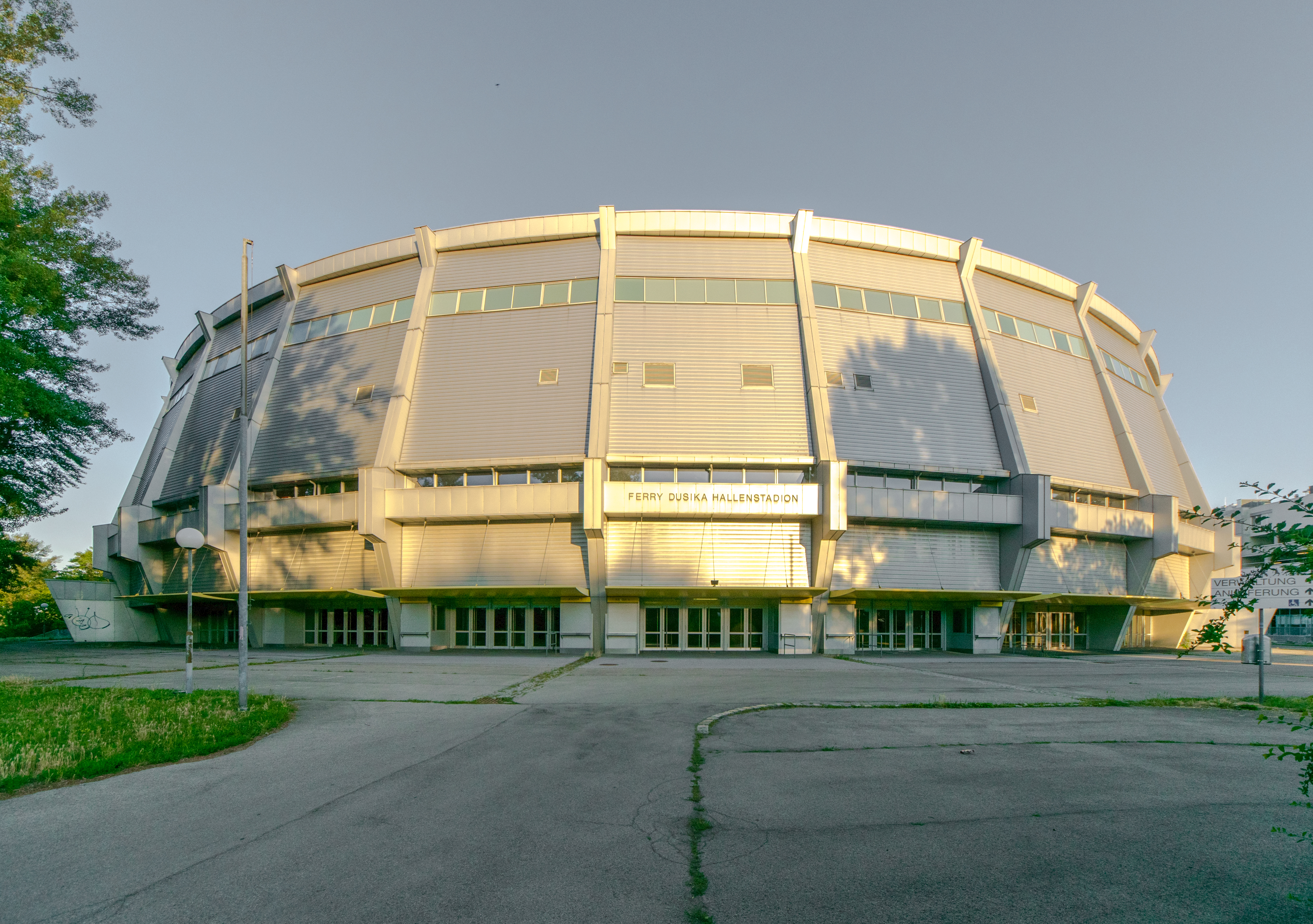
- Interactive map of Ferry-Dusika-Hallenstadion
- Location: Vienna, Austria
- Coordinates: 48°12′39″N 16°25′25″E
- Owner: City of Vienna
- Operator: Wiener Stadthalle Betriebs- und Veranstaltungsgesellschaft m.b.H.
- Capacity: 5.365 to 7.700

Construction
- Opened: 1976
- Renovated: 1999
- Closed: 2021
- Demolished: 2022

The Ferry-Dusika-Hallenstadion was an indoor arena in Vienna, Austria. It was built in 1976, held 7,700 spectators and hosted indoor sporting events such as track cycling, tennis and athletics. It hosted an annual indoor track and field meeting – the Vienna Indoor Classic.

It was named after Austrian cyclist Franz Dusika. The arena hosted the last cycling competition in July 2021. Afterwards the building was torn down. In its place, a new arena called "Sportarena Wien" will be built until 2023. The new indoor arena will not feature a velodrome. This was criticized by the Austrian Cycling Federation because they were not involved in the planning.

== Past events ==
- 1979 European Athletics Indoor Championships
- 1987 UCI Track Cycling World Championships
- 1999 Men's European Volleyball Championship
- 2002 European Athletics Indoor Championships
- 2010 European Judo Championships

== See also ==
- List of indoor arenas in Austria

Preceded by Palasport di San Siro; Milan	European Indoor Championships in Athletics; Venue; 1979	Succeeded by Glaspalast Sindelfingen; Sindelfingen
Preceded by 7-Eleven USOTC Velodrome; Colorado Springs	UCI Track Cycling World Championships; Venue; 1987	Succeeded by Blaarmeersen; Ghent
Preceded by Flanders Sports Arena; Ghent	European Indoor Championships in Athletics; Venue; 2002	Succeeded by Palacio de Deportes; Madrid
