= Jan Derksen =

Dutch cyclist (1919–2011)

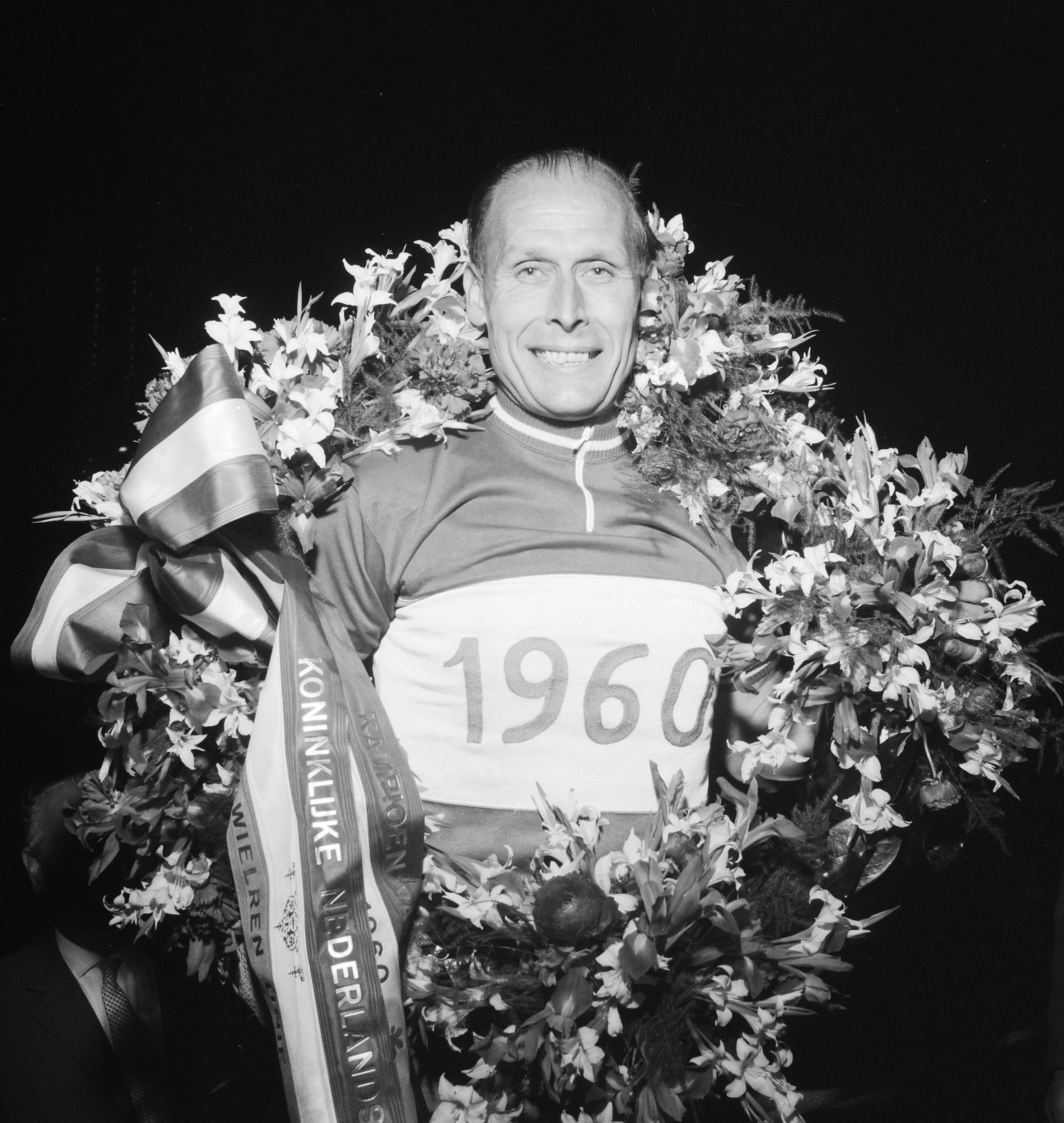
- Jan Derksen in 1960

Personal information
- Born: 23 January 1919 Geertruidenberg, the Netherlands
- Died: 22 May 2011 (aged 92) Amsterdam, the Netherlands

Sport
- Sport: Cycling
Medal record
Representing the Netherlands
Track World Championships
Bronze medal – third place	1938 Amsterdam	Sprint
Gold medal – first place	1939 Milan	Sprint
Gold medal – first place	1946 Zurich	Sprint
Silver medal – second place	1949 Copenhagen	Sprint
Bronze medal – third place	1950 Liège	Sprint
Gold medal – first place	1957 Liège	Sprint
Bronze medal – third place	1959 Amsterdam	Sprint

Jan Derksen (23 January 1919 – 22 May 2011) was a Dutch professional cyclist. He was world professional track sprint champion in 1946 and 1957. He was the only rider to win a gold medal at Milan, Italy, in 1939 – in the world amateur sprint – before the championship was abandoned at the outbreak of the Second World War. Derksen became a riders' agent and race promoter after retiring from racing and lived in a house on the outskirts of Amsterdam, named after the Ordrup track in Denmark where he won the professional omnium – akin to a pentathlon in athletics – 10 times.

== Biography ==
Jan Derksen was born at Geertruidenberg in central western Holland on 23 January 1919. He became interested in cycling after listening to radio reports of six-day races on the track. His father gave Derksen his first racing bike after he passed his last school exams at 15. He took out a racing licence with the Dutch cycling federation, the KNWU, and raced on the track at Alkmaar. A coach saw him when he was 18 and he joined the national team. He had worked until then in a cycle business.

At 19 he was third in the world amateur sprint championship, held in Amsterdam, and he became the only world champion in 1939 when the championship in Milan was abandoned because of the outbreak of the Second World War. His ride against the Italian, Astolfi, whom he beat in two rides, was the only event completed. He had been selected for the Dutch team for Olympic Games in Helsinki.

“It was as good as certain that I would win two gold medals, because I was already world champion, but then the war broke out. There were no Olympics and that really upset me.”

He continued racing during the German occupation of the Netherlands, travelling until 1942 to other occupied countries. He was Dutch sprint champion in 1943.

Derksen’s professional career after the war was marked by his competition with another Dutch sprinter, Arie van Vliet. Derksen won 13 Dutch championships, seven of them by beating van Vliet, but he also came second to van Vliet ten times. He became world champion in 1946 by beating the Frenchman, Georges Senfftleben. He won the title again in 1957, beating van Vliet in the final. His championship ride in the quarter-final in 1955 was abandoned after he and the Italian, Antonio Maspes came to a balancing standstill for 32 minutes. The judges stopped the race.

Derksen died in the night of 22 May 2011 after being ill for many years.
