= Radstadion Köln =

Velodrome in Cologne, Germany

Coordinates: 50°56′10″N 6°52′19″E

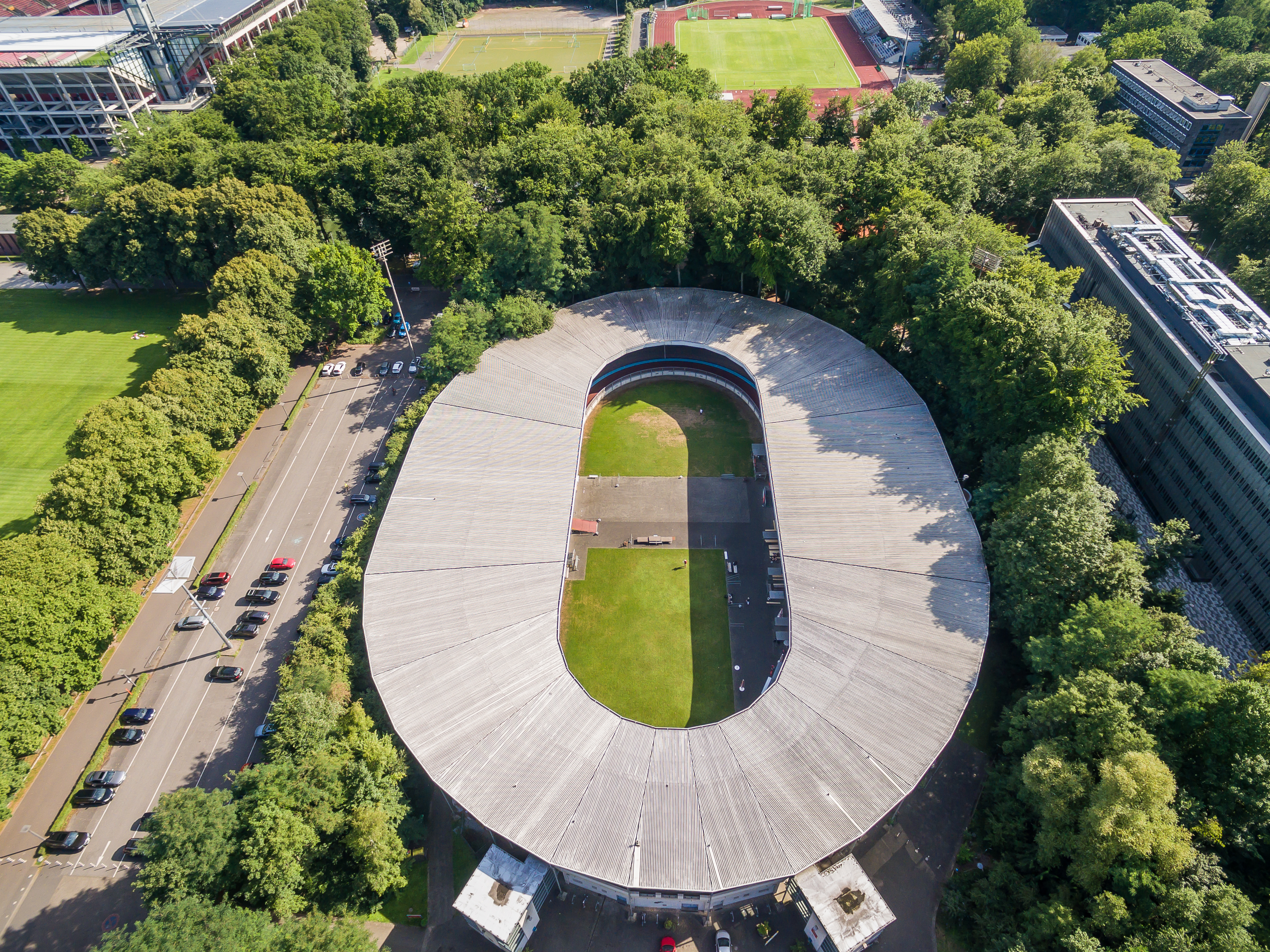
- Interactive map of Radstadion Köln
- Location: Cologne, Germany
- Capacity: 2,5000

Construction
- Opened: 1996
- Architect: Schuermann Architects

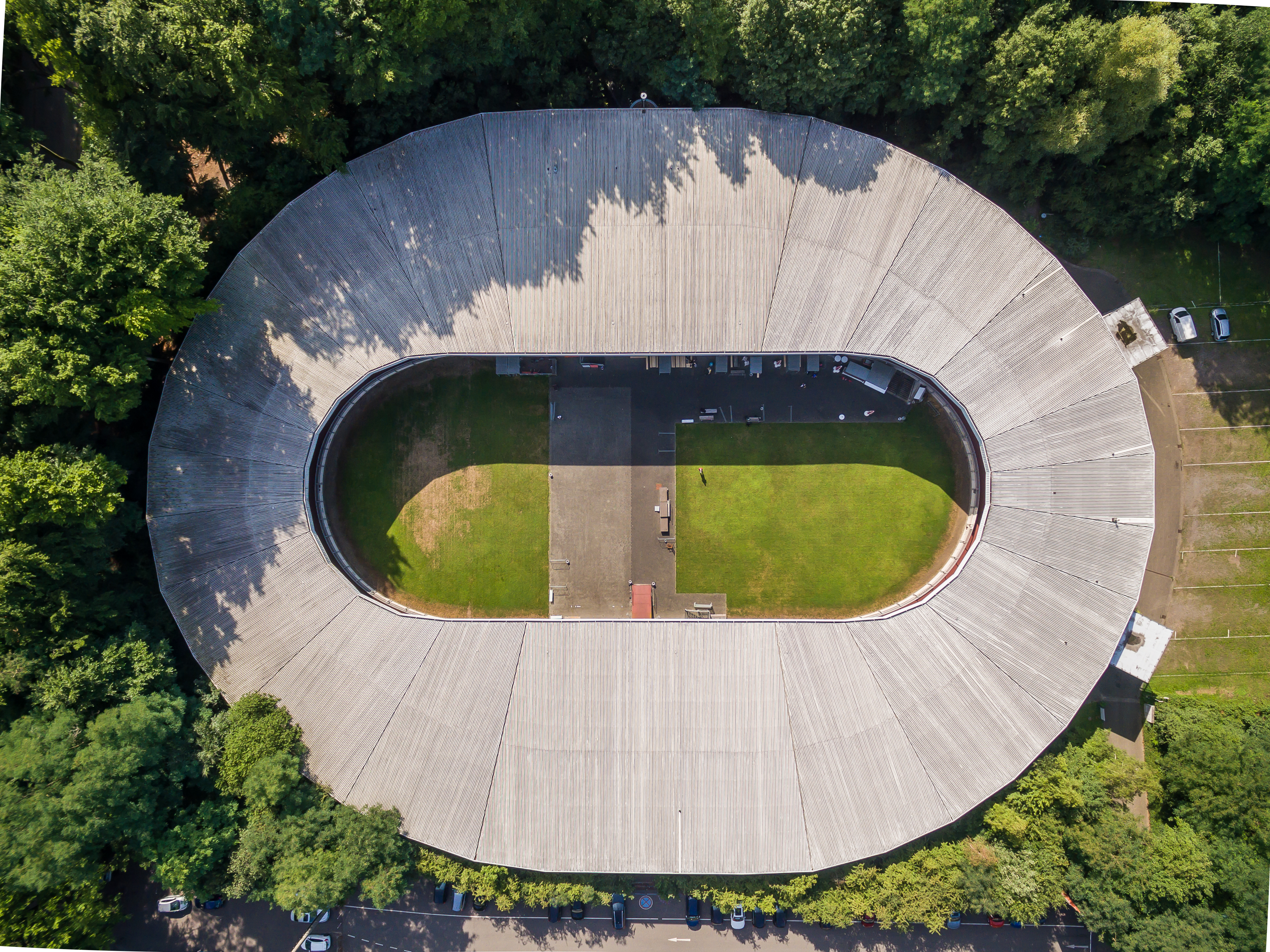
The Radstadion Köln (2017)

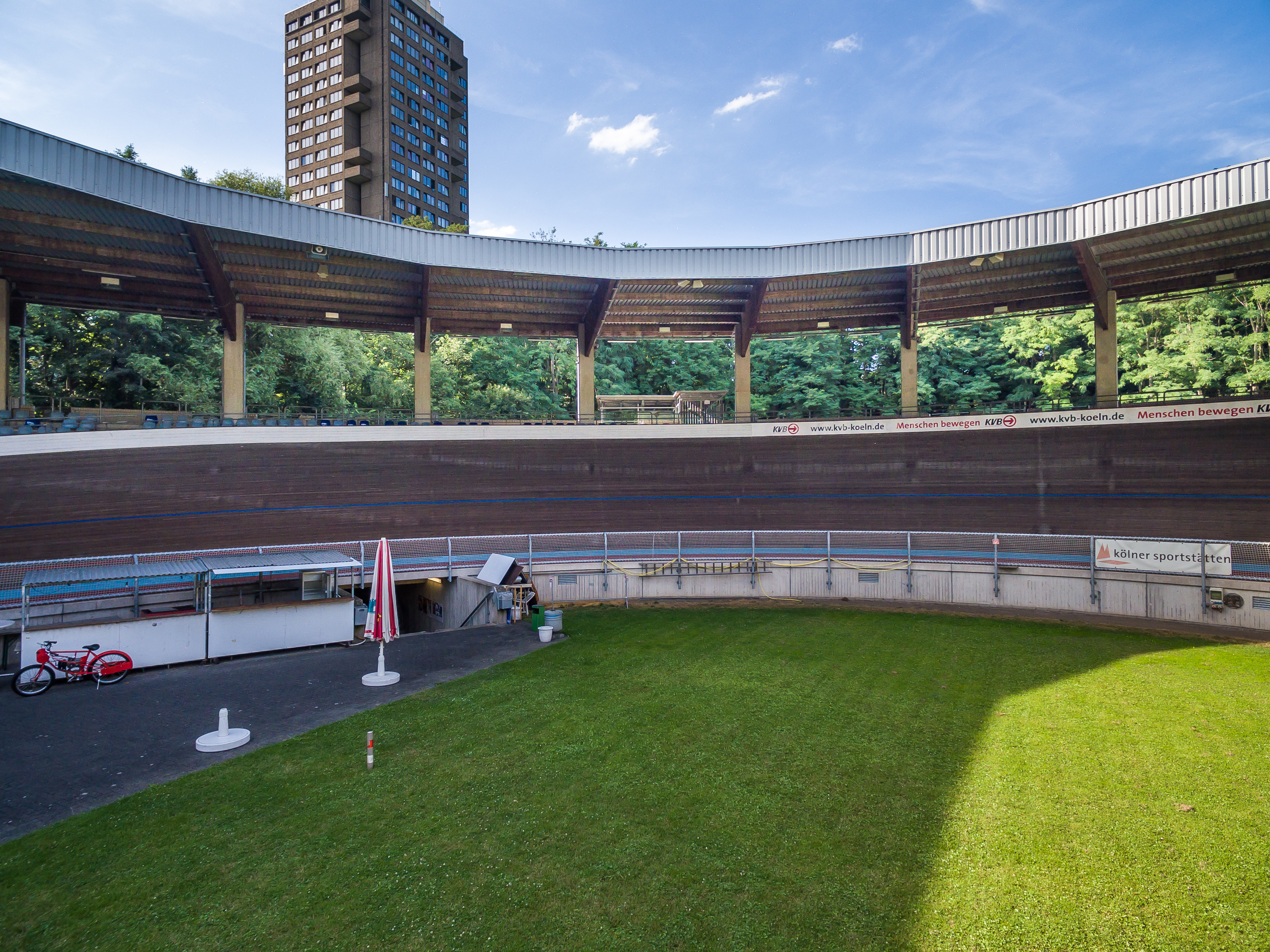
The interior (view to the north)(2017)

The Radstadion Köln (also called Albert-Richter-Bahn) is a velodrome in Cologne.

The partly covered wooden track of 250 meters was designed and built by the famous cycling track architect Ralph Schürmann. This means it meets the Olympic standard. The veledrom bears the name of world champion Albert Richter and has a capacity of 4,500 with 2,500 seats.
