= 1933 UCI Track Cycling World Championships =

- Venue: Paris, France
- Date: 11–15 August 1933
- Velodrome: Parc des Princes
- Events: 3

The 1933 UCI Track Cycling World Championships were the World Championship for track cycling. They took place in Paris, France from 11 to 15 August 1933. Three events for men were contested, two for professionals and one for amateurs.

== Medal summary ==
Event	Gold	Silver	Bronze
Men's Professional Events
Men's sprint	Jef Scherens; Belgium	Lucien Michard; France	Albert Richter; Germany
Men's motor-paced	Charles Lacquehay; France	Franco Giorgetti; Italy	Erich Metze; Germany
Men's Amateur Events
Men's sprint	Jacobus van Egmond; Netherlands	Roland Ulrich; France	Anker Meyer-Andersen; Denmark

== Medal table ==
Rank	Nation	Gold	Silver	Bronze	Total
1	France (FRA)	1	2	0	3
2	Belgium (BEL)	1	0	0	1
2	Netherlands (NED)	1	0	0	1
4	Italy (ITA)	0	1	0	1
5	Germany (GER)	0	0	2	2
6	Denmark (DEN)	0	0	1	1
Totals (6 entries)		3	3	3	9

== See also ==
- 1933 UCI Road World Championships
