= Czech Republic at the UCI Track Cycling World Championships =

Czech Republic at the 2015 UCI Track Cycling World Championships
- IOC code: CZE

in Saint-Quentin-en-Yvelines, France 18 February – 22 February 2015
- Competitors: 9
- Medals Ranked -th: Gold 0 Silver 0 Bronze 0 Total 0

UCI Track Cycling World Championships appearances (overview)
- Overview page Recent: 2008; 2009; 2010; 2011; 2012; 2013; 2014; 2015; 2016; 2017; 2018; 2019; 2020; 2021; 2022; 2023; 2024; 2025

The Czech Republic competed at the 2015 UCI Track Cycling World Championships in Saint-Quentin-en-Yvelines at the Vélodrome de Saint-Quentin-en-Yvelines from 18 to 22 February 2015. A team of 9 cyclists (2 women, 7 men) was announced to represent the country in the event.

== Results ==
=== Men ===
Name	Event	Result	Rank
Pavel Kelemen	Men's sprint	9.825 (Q),	15
Adam Ptáčník	Men's sprint	9.996	25
Robin Wagner	Men's 1 km time trial	1:01.976	14
Tomáš Bábek	Men's 1 km time trial	1:02.771	17
Jiří Hochmann	Men's scratch	—	14
Vojtěch Hačecký	Men's points race	6 points	13
Martin Bláha; Vojtěch Hačecký	Men's madison	3 points	6

=== Women ===
Name	Event	Result	Rank
Jarmila Machačová	Women's points race	0 points	17
Lucie Záleská	Women's omnium	64 points	18
Jarmila Machačová	Women's scratch	—	15

== 2016 ==
Czech Republic at the 2016 UCI Track Cycling World Championships
- IOC code: CZE

in London, United Kingdom 2 March – 6 March 2016
- Competitors: 9 (7 men, 2 women)

UCI Track Cycling World Championships appearances (overview)
- Recent: 2008; 2009; 2010; 2011; 2012; 2013; 2014; 2015; 2016; 2017; 2018; 2019; 2020; 2021; 2022; 2023; 2024; 2025

Czech Republic competed at the 2016 UCI Track Cycling World Championships at the Lee Valley VeloPark in London, United Kingdom from 2–4 March 2016. A team of 9 cyclists (2 women, 7 men) was announced to represent the country in the event.

== Results ==
=== Men ===
Name	Event	Result	Rank
Pavel Kelemen	Men's sprint		16
Adam Ptáčník	Men's sprint		31
Tomáš Bábek	Men's 1 km time trial	01:01.962	7
Robin Wagner	Men's 1 km time trial	01:02.206	8
Pavel Kelemen	Men's keirin	—	11
Adam Ptáčník	Men's keirin	—	–
Vojtech Hacecky	Men's scratch	—	6
Martin Bláha	Men's points race	-20 points	16
Martin Bláha; Vojtech Hacecký	Men's madison	1 points (-1 laps down)	8

=== Women ===
Name	Event	Result	Rank
Jarmila Machačová	Women's scratch	—	5
Jarmila Machačová	Women's points race	5 points	9
