= 1894 ICA Track Cycling World Championships =

Cycling competition

- Poster to the velodrome's 1894 summer events, including the World Championships
- Venue: Antwerp, Belgium
- Date: 12–13 August 1894
- Velodrome: Velodroom van Zurenborg
- Events: 3

The 1894 ICA Track Cycling World Championships was the second World Championship for track cycling. They took place in Antwerp, Belgium from 12 to 13 August 1894. Three events for amateur men were contested: sprint, stayers' race (motor-paced) and a 10 km, now classified as a scratch race.

== Medal summary ==
Event	Gold	Silver	Bronze
Men's Amateur Events
Men's sprint	August Lehr; Germany	Jaap Eden; Netherlands	William Broadbridge; United Kingdom
Men's motor-paced	Wilhelm Henie; Norway	Jack Green; United Kingdom	Georges Van Oolen; Belgium
Men's 10 km	Jaap Eden; Netherlands	John Green; United Kingdom	Tommy Osborne; United Kingdom

== Medal table ==
Rank	Nation	Gold	Silver	Bronze	Total
1	Netherlands (NED)	1	1	0	2
2	Germany (GER)	1	0	0	1
2	Norway (NOR)	1	0	0	1
4	Great Britain (GBR)	0	2	2	4
5	Belgium (BEL)	0	0	1	1
Totals (5 entries)		3	3	3	9
