= Hungary at the UCI Track Cycling World Championships =

Hungary at the 2016 UCI Track Cycling World Championships
- IOC code: HUN

in London, United Kingdom 2 March – 6 March 2016
- Competitors: 1 (1 men, 0 women)

UCI Track Cycling World Championships appearances (overview)
- Recent: 2008; 2009; 2010; 2011; 2012; 2013; 2014; 2015; 2016; 2017; 2018; 2019; 2020; 2021; 2022; 2023; 2024; 2025

Hungary competed at the 2016 UCI Track Cycling World Championships at the Lee Valley VeloPark in London, United Kingdom from 2–4 March 2016. A team of 1 cyclists (0 women, 1 men) was announced to represent the country in the event.

== Results ==
=== Men ===
Name	Event	Result	Rank
Sandor Szalontay	Men's sprint		18
