= Schuermann =

Schuermann Architects of Münster, Germany, is a dynasty of architects specialising in the design of velodromes, cycle tracks and indoor athletics tracks since 1925.

The Schuermann dynasty was founded by Clemens Schuermann (1888–1956), professional track cyclist and later architect, continued by his son Herbert Schuermann (1925–1994) and his grandson Ralph Schuermann (born 1953).

They have designed more than 125 cycle tracks worldwide, among them many velodromes for Olympic Games, namely in Berlin in 1936, Rome in 1960, Mexico City in 1968, Munich in 1972, Seoul in 1986, Barcelona in 1990, and Beijing in 2008. They have also designed very famous world-record tracks as the Velodromo Vigorelli in Milan, Italy; "CDOM" in Mexico City, Mexico; "Velodrom" in Berlin, Germany and The Sir Chris Hoy Velodrome in Glasgow. They also designed the track for the World-Training-Center CMC of the Union Cycliste Internationale in Aigle, Switzerland, a 200-meter wooden indoor track. Schuermann also designed the "Viking Ship", the speed skating venue for the 1994 Winter Olympics, which can also be used as a velodrome, and has seen record performances in both sports.

== See also ==
- Radstadion
- Radstadion Köln
- Velòdrom d'Horta
- Track cycling
