= 1931 UCI Track Cycling World Championships =

- Venue: Copenhagen, Denmark
- Date: 21–30 August 1931
- Velodrome: Ordrupbanen
- Events: 3

The 1931 UCI Track Cycling World Championships were the World Championship for track cycling. They took place in Copenhagen, Denmark from 21 to 30 August 1931. Three events for men were contested, two for professionals and one for amateurs.

== Medal summary ==
| Event | Gold | Silver | Bronze |
|---|---|---|---|
Men's Professional Events
| Men's sprint | Willy Falck Hansen; Denmark | Lucien Michard; France | Jef Scherens; Belgium |
| Men's motor-paced | Walter Sawall; Germany | Erich Möller; Germany | Victor Linart; Belgium |
Men's Amateur Events
| Men's sprint | Helger Harder; Denmark | Willy Gervin; Denmark | Anker Meyer-Andersen; Denmark |

== Medal table ==
| Rank | Nation | Gold | Silver | Bronze | Total |
|---|---|---|---|---|---|
| 1 | Denmark (DEN) | 2 | 1 | 1 | 4 |
| 2 | Germany (GER) | 1 | 1 | 0 | 2 |
| 3 | France (FRA) | 0 | 1 | 0 | 1 |
| 4 | Belgium (BEL) | 0 | 0 | 2 | 2 |
| Totals (4 entries) | | 3 | 3 | 3 | 9 |

== See also ==
- 1931 UCI Road World Championships
