= 1932 UCI Track Cycling World Championships =

Cycling competition

- Venue: Rome, Italy
- Date: 27 August - 4 September 1932
- Velodrome: Stadio Nazionale PNF
- Events: 3

The 1932 UCI Track Cycling World Championships were the World Championship for track cycling. They took place in Rome, Italy from 27 August to 4 September 1932. Three events for men were contested, two for professionals and one for amateurs.

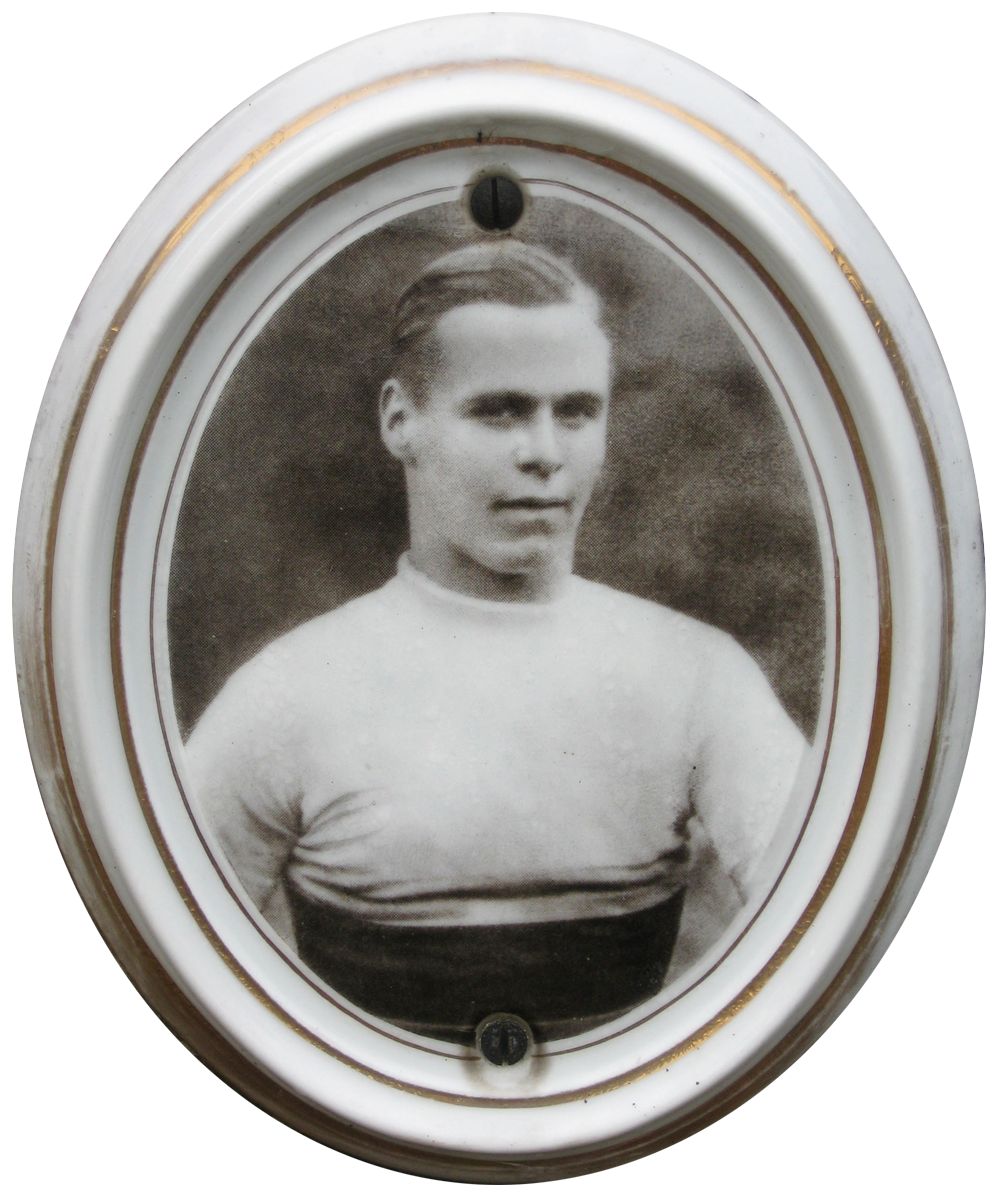
Albert Richter (1912–1940) with the 1932 rainbow jersey

== Medal summary ==
| Event | Gold | Silver | Bronze |
|---|---|---|---|
Men's Professional Events
| Men's sprint | Jef Scherens; Belgium | Lucien Michard; France | Mathias Engel; Germany |
| Men's motor-paced | Georges Paillard; France | Walter Sawall; Germany | Erich Möller; Germany |
Men's Amateur Events
| Men's sprint | Albert Richter; Germany | Nino Mozzo; Italy | Franz Dusika; Austria |

== Medal table ==
| Rank | Nation | Gold | Silver | Bronze | Total |
|---|---|---|---|---|---|
| 1 | Germany (GER) | 1 | 1 | 2 | 4 |
| 2 | France (FRA) | 1 | 1 | 0 | 2 |
| 3 | Belgium (BEL) | 1 | 0 | 0 | 1 |
| 4 | Italy (ITA) | 0 | 1 | 0 | 1 |
| 5 | Austria (AUT) | 0 | 0 | 1 | 1 |
| Totals (5 entries) | | 3 | 3 | 3 | 9 |

== See also ==
- 1932 UCI Road World Championships
