= Arie van Vliet =

Dutch cyclist

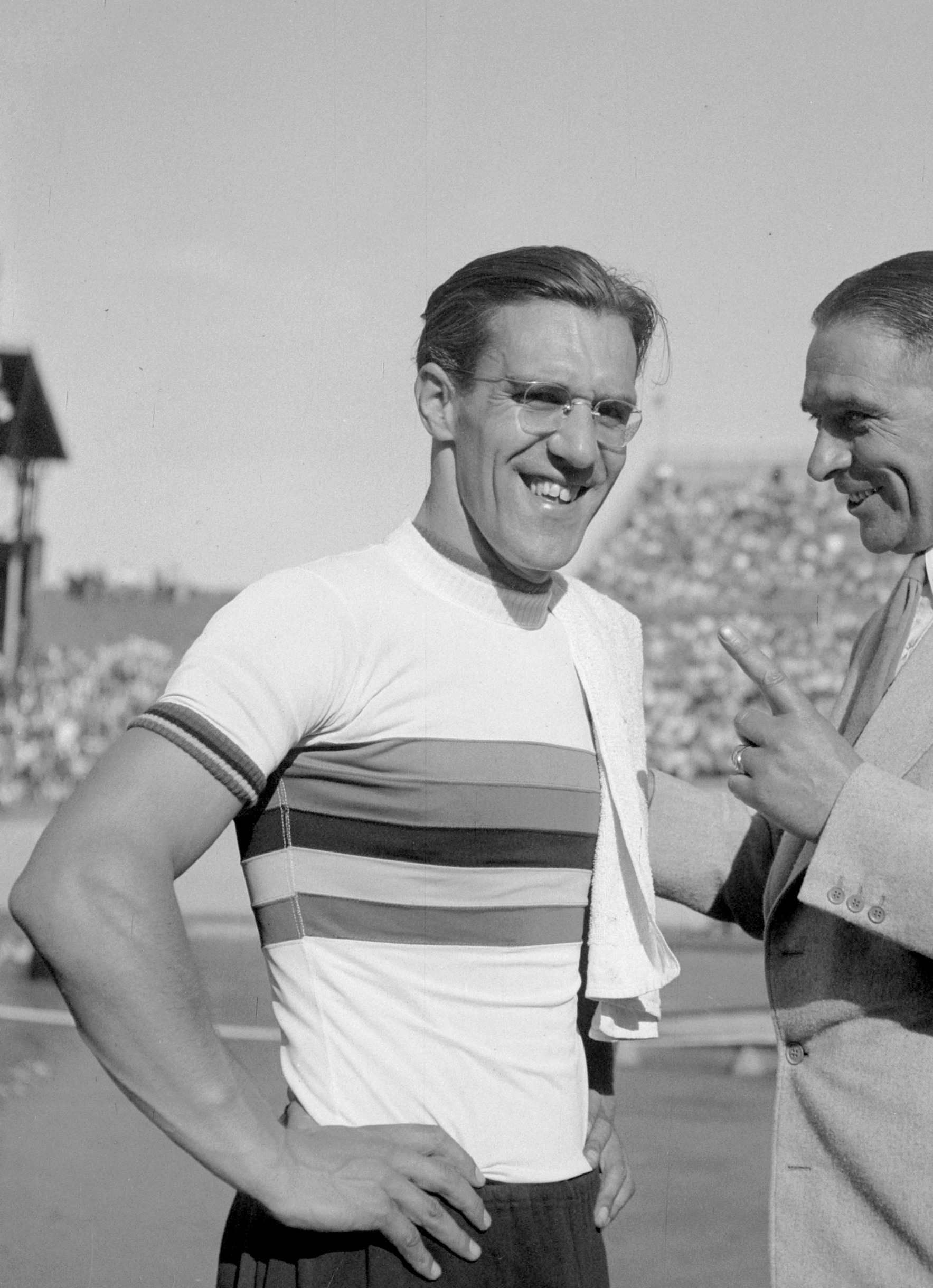
- van Vliet in 1948

Personal information
- Born: 18 March 1916 Woerden, Netherlands
- Died: 9 July 2001 (aged 85) Woerden, Netherlands

Sport
- Sport: Cycling
Medal record
Representing the Netherlands
Olympic Games
Gold medal – first place	1936 Berlin	1000m time trial
Silver medal – second place	1936 Berlin	Sprint
Track World Championships
Gold medal – first place	1936 Zurich	Amateur sprint
Gold medal – first place	1938 Amsterdam	Sprint
Gold medal – first place	1948 Amsterdam	Sprint
Gold medal – first place	1953 Zurich	Sprint
Silver medal – second place	1934 Leipzig	Amateur sprint
Silver medal – second place	1935 Brussels	Amateur sprint
Silver medal – second place	1937 Copenhagen	Sprint
Silver medal – second place	1950 Liege	Sprint
Silver medal – second place	1954 Cologne	Sprint
Silver medal – second place	1957 Liege	Sprint
Bronze medal – third place	1946 Zurich	Sprint
Bronze medal – third place	1949 Copenhagen	Sprint
Bronze medal – third place	1955 Milan	Sprint

Arie Gerrit van Vliet (18 March 1916 – 9 July 2001) was a Dutch sprint cyclist. Between 1934 and 1957, he won 13 medals at world championships, including four gold medals, and set several world records in sprint events, despite the interruption by World War II. He also won a gold medal in 1000 m time trial and a silver medal in the individual sprint at the 1936 Summer Olympics in Berlin. His Olympic sprint race was obstructed by the winner, German cyclist Toni Merkens, who was however not disqualified, but merely fined for 100 German marks.

== See also ==
- List of Dutch Olympic cyclists

Awards
Preceded by Abe Lenstra	Dutch Sportsman of the Year; 1953	Succeeded by Geertje Wielema
