= Albert Richter =

German racing cyclist killed by the Nazis (1912–1940)

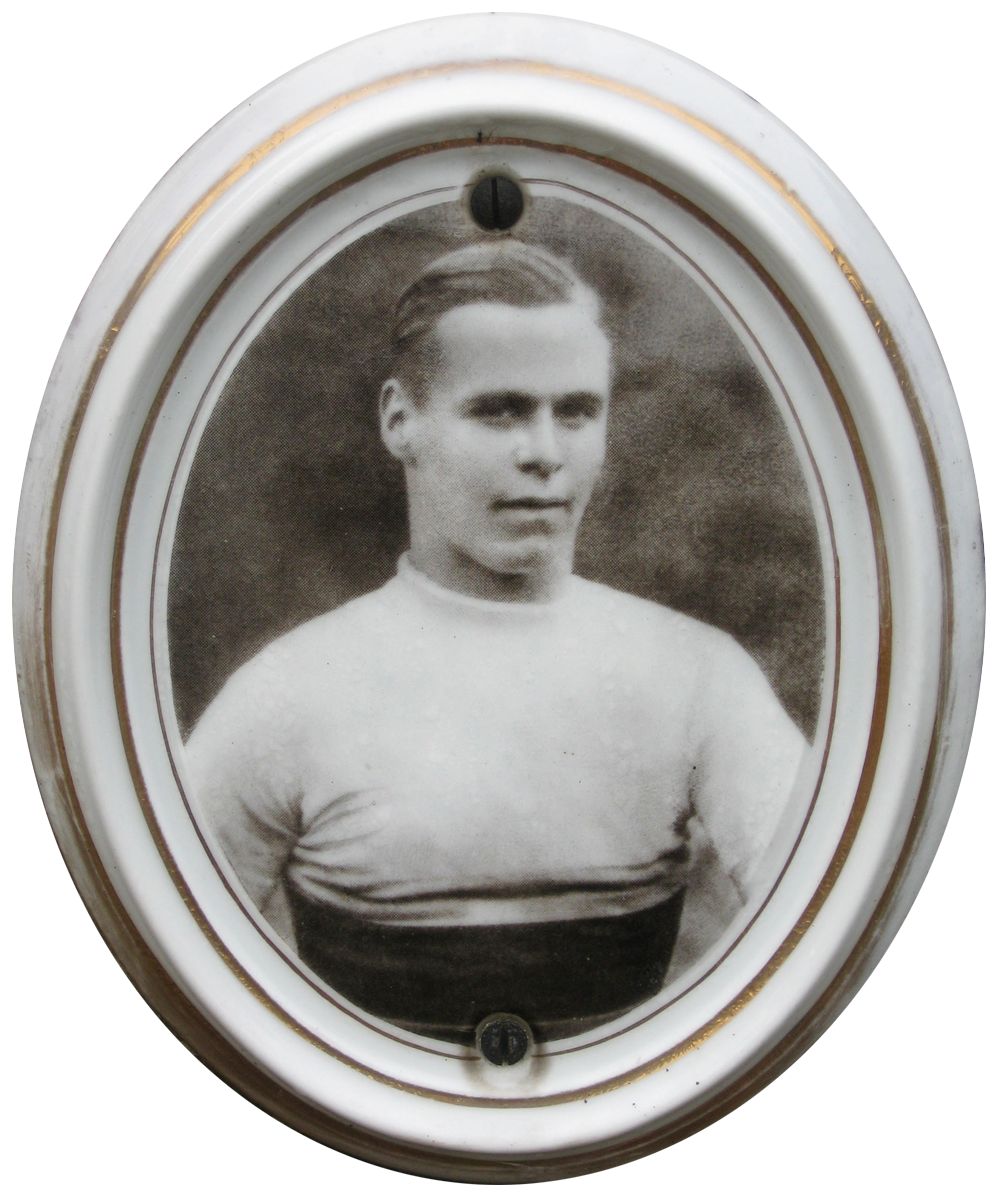
- Albert Richter, wearing the World Champion 1932 jersey.

Personal information
- Full name: Albert Richter
- Nickname: The German eight cylinder
- Born: 14 October 1912 Cologne, Germany
- Died: 2 January 1940 (aged 27) Unknown

Cycling career
- Sport: Cycling
- Disciplines: Road and track
- Role: Rider

Major wins
- 1932 – World amateur sprint champion 1932 – Grand Prix de Paris (amateur); 1934 – Grand Prix de Paris; 1938 – Grand Prix de Paris; 1939 – Grand Prix de Berlin

Albert Richter (14 October 1912 – 2 January 1940) was a German cyclist who won the world sprint championship. He was taken from a train by the Gestapo and never seen alive again.

== Background ==
Albert Richter, known to friends as Teddy, grew up in Sömmeringstraße 72, Ehrenfeld, Cologne. He was one of three brothers born in Cologne to a talented musician. Charles learned the saxophone, Josef the clarinet and Albert the violin.

Albert worked with his father and Charles in a family business making plaster figurines, although some sources say he was a plasterer, but he was frequently out of work in the Depression. He used his spare time to train on the velodrome in Cologne, in secret because his father disapproved. He rode his first races, on the road and on the track, at 16. His father found out when Albert broke his collar bone. His rides, however, attracted the attention of Ernst Berliner, a former cycling champion who ran a furniture business in the city and who had become a reputed cycling coach. Berliner was Jewish and had had his business ransacked several times by Brown Shirts.

In 1932, after winning the Grand Prix de Paris, Richter hoped to be picked for the Olympic Games in Los Angeles. But he was disappointed. The German federation could not afford his fare.

== Professional career ==
Richter went to Rome and won the world sprint amateur championship on September 3. He was greeted enthusiastically in Cologne. He turned professional and Berliner sent him to Paris, the centre of European track cycling. Agnès Granjon said in her short biography:

There were races all through the year on the four vélodromes in Paris. Richter quickly learned French in particular by watching films, and adapted quickly to his new life. After uncertain beginnings, the young German triumphed at the Vélodrome d'hiver by winning a competition for foreign sprinters. His fluid style, dynamic and powerful, won him the admiration of all. Adopted in a few months by the Parisian public, Albert Richter became very popular in France and gathered a new nickname: the German eight-cylinder.

Richter lived in Paris and spent more time abroad than in Germany. He was open about his opposition to the rise of Hitler and his National Socialism. Sepp Dinkelkamp, a Swiss sprinter, said:

"I say with confidence that Albert was an anti-Nazi. If he had followed the Nazis, it would certainly have been a lot easier for him, and to his advantage. But Albert chose another way."

Richter became part of a travelling circus of sprinters that included Jef Scherens and Louis Gérardin. Richter refused to wear a German jersey with a swastika when he raced, preferring the older style with the traditional German eagle. He was on the podium of every championship he rode from 1933 to 1939 (e.g., UCI Track Cycling World Championships – Men's Sprint), although never with the gold medal. Scherens won the world championship every year from 1932 to 1937. Richter came third in 1933 behind him and Lucien Michard. In the two following years Scherens, Richter and Gérardin finished in that order. In 1936, Richter and Gérardin changed places. In 1937 and 1938 he again came in third.

== Flight from Germany ==
Two riders whom Richter consistently beat – Werner Miethe and Peter Steffes – were to play a role in his death. Lon Pullen said:

Miethe was already engaged in espionage work on behalf of the Reich, and he and Steffes were also later involved in marketing valuables taken from French Jews who had become victims of the Nazi pogrom. In September 1937, Richter's manager, Berliner, threatened by Steffes with exposure to the Gestapo for alleged smuggling of marks outside Germany, fled with his family to Holland... Even Richter could see that his survival would only be possible if he left the country.

For a while, he stayed. He occasionally gave Nazi salutes but he refused to spy during his foreign journeys. He won the bronze medal in the 1939 world championship – the races were not completed because news came partway that Germany had invaded Poland – and then decided to avoid being called into the army, particularly because it would mean shooting at the French. Instead, he would escape to Switzerland once he had ridden the Berlin Grand Prix in the Deutschlandhalle on 9 December. Richter had many friends in Switzerland, the family of cyclists called Suter (see Heiri Suter), and a family that owned a hotel in Engelberg.

He called Berliner, who urged him not to return to Germany. He also told Berliner that a Jewish business man from Cologne named Schweizer, who had already left Germany, had asked him to smuggle money for him when he went. Against Berliner's advice, he went to Berlin and won the grand prix, his last victory.

== Death ==
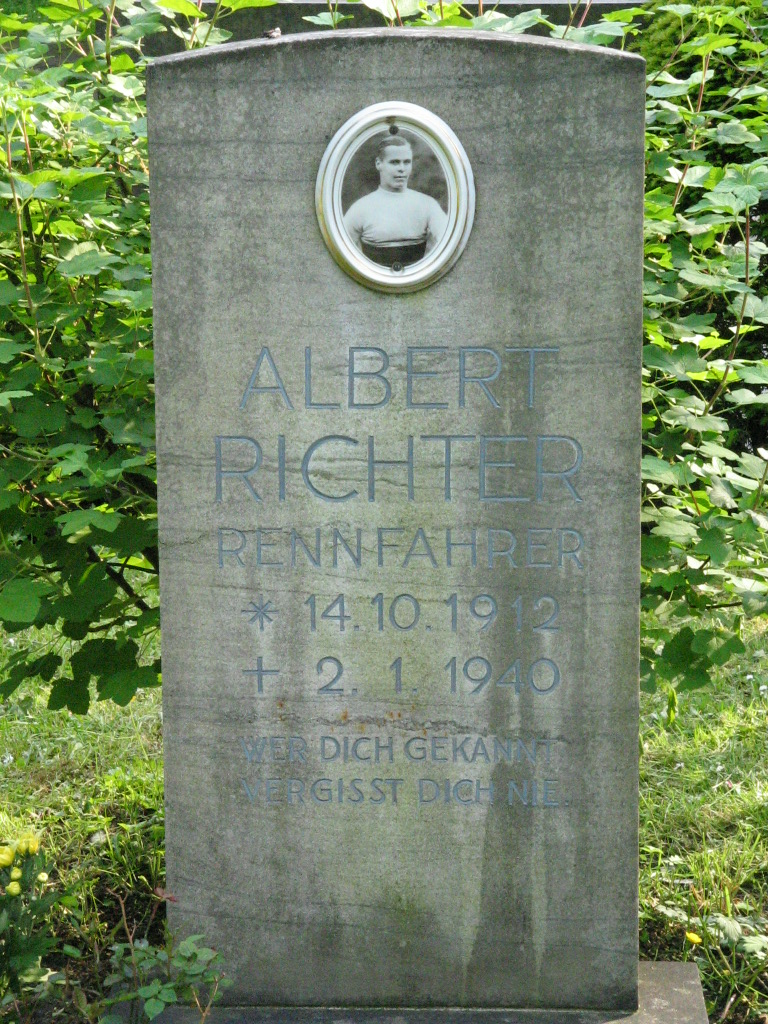
Albert Richter's tomb

On 31 December 1939, he boarded the train to Switzerland. It crossed into Switzerland at Weil am Rhein. The station straddled the border and it was there that the German steam engine would be replaced by a Swiss electric locomotive. German exit controls and Swiss entry controls could be carried out at the same place. To catch smugglers on the border meant their guilt was clear.

Two Dutch sprinters, Cor Wals and Kees Pellenaars, later the Netherlands' Tour de France manager, had been on the train since Amsterdam. They told the Belgian newspaper Het Volk that German soldiers walked through the snow on the station platform and went straight to Richter's compartment. The door opened and Richter fell unconscious from the train. The Germans pulled his bike from the baggage van – not bothering with his suitcase – and cut open the tyres. Inside were 12,700 marks.

Richter, still unconscious, was pulled along the platform, the Dutchmen said, his legs trailing behind him. Outside the station, witnesses said, Richter was loaded on a truck and taken to Lörrach, site of a "correction" camp.

Richter had been a popular champion. He had been seen being dragged from the train. The Germans insisted he had died skiing but Richter was still in Germany. The next claim was that he had been beaten to death by rival smugglers, and then that he had hanged himself in his cell in shame. One version is that he was given the choice between suicide and a firing squad, that he shot himself with a revolver and that the Germans then said he had died on the eastern front.

When one of his brothers tried to see him on 2 January, he was shown Richter's corpse in the hospital morgue or, according to some reports, slumped in a cell. It was bloody and his suit full of holes. Berliner tried to learn the truth after the war but was unsuccessful. His death has not been formally registered. The German cycling federation said: "His name has been effaced from our ranks, from our memories, for ever."

== Gestapo's knowledge ==
It will never be known how the Gestapo knew not only that Richter planned to smuggle money but when he would do it and where he would hide it. Wals and Pellenaers said the agents were not interested in anything but the bike's tyres. Speculation is that they were told by Steffes or Miethe. Miethe was a professional informer. Their link was through the German federation; their link to Richter was through his manager, Berliner. Berliner had smuggled money and Miethe and Steffes had found out. The French historian, Pierre Chany, says it was Richter who did the smuggling. Miethe or Steffes went to see Berliner and that was why Berliner and his family fled to the Netherlands. Berliner and Richter had stayed in touch. Miethe and Steffes knew that. Richter appeared to have trusted Steffes and may even have told him about the money. Lon Pullen said:

The German television film [see below] included an interview with Peter Steffes and his wife, then in their 80s. Steffes' manner before the cameras left no doubt in the minds of viewers that his conscience was not clear on the matter... The most currently accepted theory is that Victor Brack, acting upon information from Miethe or Steffes, had given the order for the apprehension and execution of Germany's greatest track rider.

This theory was confirmed by a German named Huertgen, living in Argentina, to Karl Altenburger, the German industrialist whose name became known in post-war Britain through his gears and brakes. Under threats from Nazis living in Argentina, Huertgen withdrew this statement.

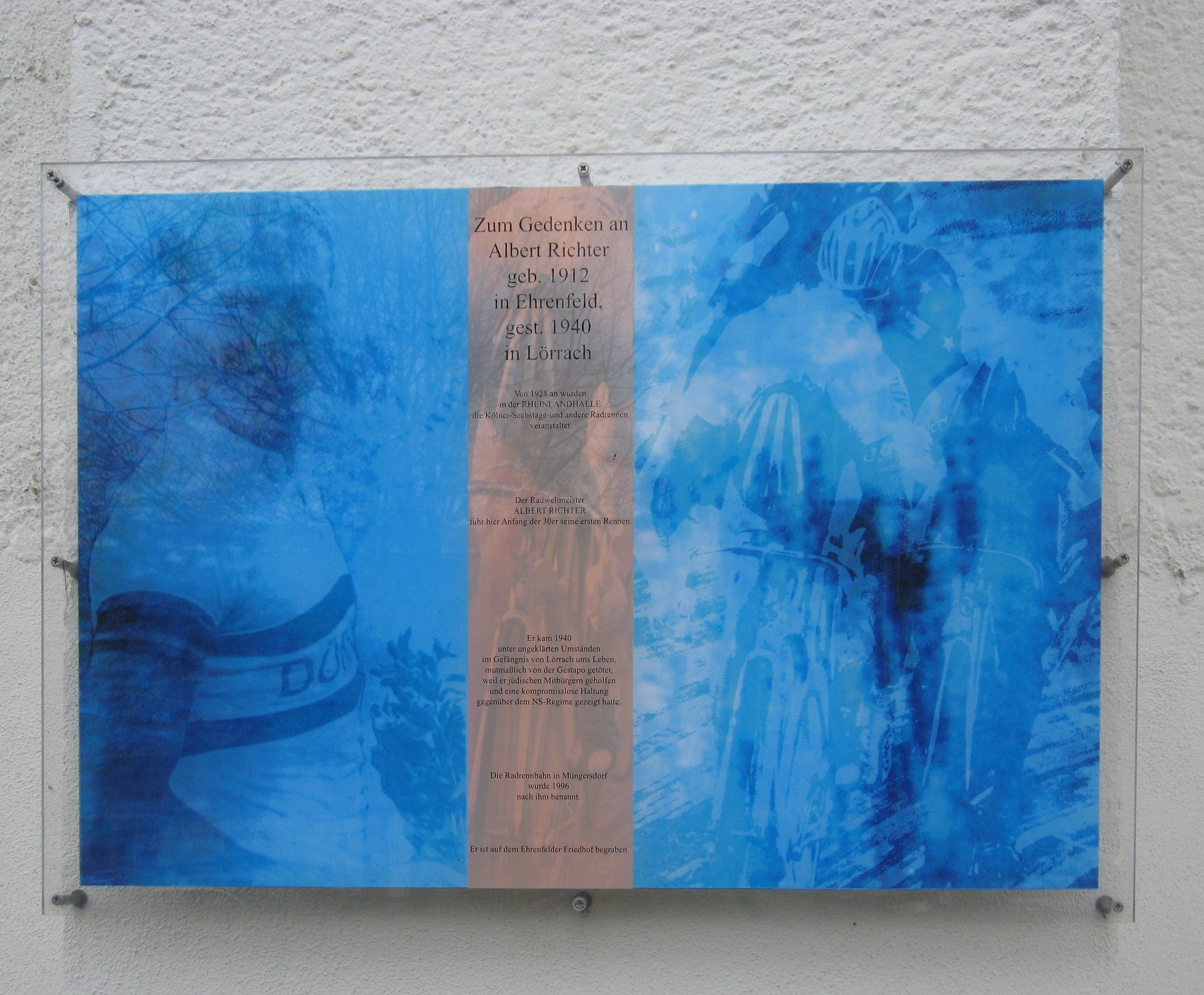
Commemorative plaque in Rheinlandhalle, Köln-Ehrenfeld (Germany)

In the documentary, made by Raimund Weber and cameraman Tillmann Scholl in 1990, Auf der Suche nach Albert Richter ('Looking for Albert Richter'), Steffes' wife jumped in on a question asked of her husband and called Berliner "ein Schweinehund."

Victor Brack could not be questioned. He was hanged for war crimes after being convicted at the Nuremberg Doctors' trial at Landsberg Prison, on 2 June 1948. Berliner survived the war and emigrated to the United States.

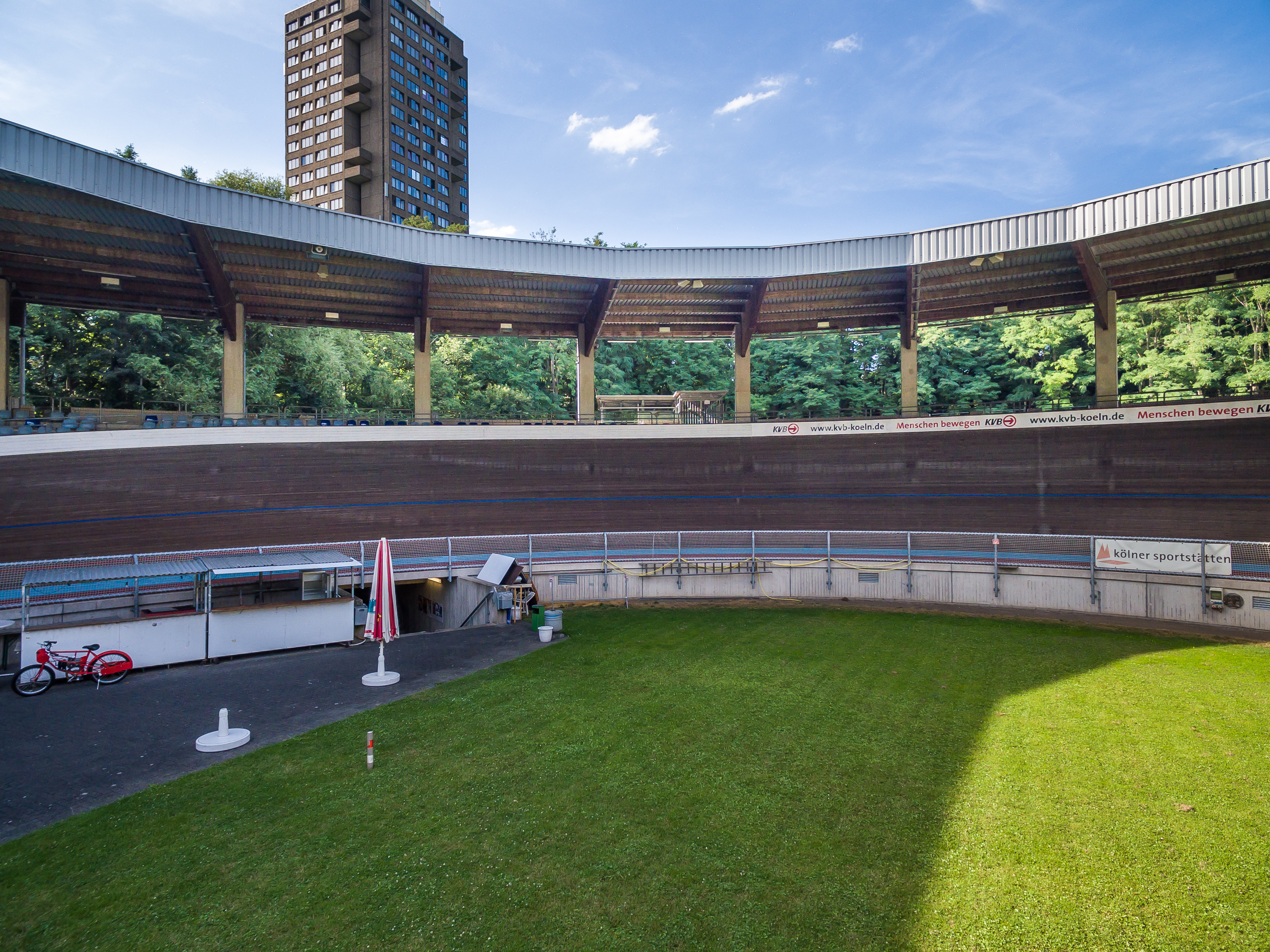
The Albert Richter velodrome in Cologne

== Burial and honour ==
Richter was buried in the Melaten-Friedhof cemetery. In 1977, the new Cologne velodrome was named Albert Richter. In 2018 the International Cycling Film Festival introduced the film award Souvenir Albert Richter for the best road cycling film of the festival.

Albert Richter was inducted to the Germany's Sports Hall of Fame in 2008.

== Palmarès ==
- Grand Prix de Paris 1932, 1934, 1938
- World amateur sprint champion 1932 (on a Selbach)
- Germany sprint champion 1933, 1934, 1935, 1936, 1937, 1938, 1939
- UCI Grand Prix, 1934
- Grand Prix de la République, 1934
- Grand Prix de Berlin 1939
- Silver medal UCI Track Cycling World Championships – Men's Sprint 1934, 1935
- Bronze medal UCI Track Cycling World Championships – Men's Sprint 1933, 1936, 1937, 1938

== Bibliography ==
Franz, Renate: Der vergessene Weltmeister. Das rätselhafte Schicksal des Radrennfahrers Albert Richter, Covadonga, 2007.
