= Cycling at the 2014 Asian Games – Women's sprint =

Women's sprint at the 2014 Asian Games
- Venue: Incheon International Velodrome
- Date: 23–25 September 2014
- Competitors: 10 from 6 nations

Medalists
gold medal	Lee Wai Sze	Hong Kong
silver medal	Zhong Tianshi	China
bronze medal	Lin Junhong	China

The women's sprint competition at the 2014 Asian Games was held from 23 to 25 September at the Incheon International Velodrome.

== Schedule ==
All times are Korea Standard Time (UTC+09:00)

Date	Time	Event
Tuesday, 23 September 2014	10:00	Qualifying
Wednesday, 24 September 2014	16:26	Quarterfinals
Wednesday, 24 September 2014	17:53	Race for 5th–8th places
Thursday, 25 September 2014	16:00	Semifinals
Thursday, 25 September 2014	17:47	Finals

== Records ==
Prior to this competition, the existing world, Asian and Games records were as follows.

World Record	Kristina Vogel (GER)	10.384	Aguascalientes, Mexico	7 December 2013
Asian Record	Zhong Tianshi (CHN)	10.573	Aguascalientes, Mexico	18 January 2013
Games Record	Guo Shuang (CHN)	10.958	Guangzhou, China	14 November 2010

== Results ==
Legend

- REL — Relegated

=== Qualifying ===
Rank	Athlete	Time	Notes
1	Zhong Tianshi (CHN)	10.780	GR
2	Lee Wai Sze (HKG)	10.831	
3	Lin Junhong (CHN)	11.116	
4	Lee Hye-jin (KOR)	11.205	
5	Fatehah Mustapa (MAS)	11.211	
6	Kayono Maeda (JPN)	11.380	
7	Takako Ishii (JPN)	11.615	
8	Lee Eun-ji (KOR)	11.764	
9	Deborah Herold (IND)	12.118	
10	Kezia Varghese (IND)	12.897	

=== Quarterfinals ===
==== Heat 1 ====
Rank	Athlete	1st race	2nd race	Decider
1	Zhong Tianshi (CHN)	12.377	11.936	
2	Lee Eun-ji (KOR)			

==== Heat 2 ====
Rank	Athlete	1st race	2nd race	Decider
1	Lee Wai Sze (HKG)	12.040	12.394	
2	Takako Ishii (JPN)			

==== Heat 3 ====
Rank	Athlete	1st race	2nd race	Decider
1	Lin Junhong (CHN)	12.425	12.248	
2	Kayono Maeda (JPN)			

==== Heat 4 ====
Rank	Athlete	1st race	2nd race	Decider
1	Fatehah Mustapa (MAS)	12.252	12.112	
2	Lee Hye-jin (KOR)			

=== Race for 5th–8th places ===
Rank	Athlete	Time
1	Lee Hye-jin (KOR)	11.787
2	Takako Ishii (JPN)	
3	Kayono Maeda (JPN)	
4	Lee Eun-ji (KOR)	

=== Semifinals ===
==== Heat 1 ====
Rank	Athlete	1st race	2nd race	Decider
1	Zhong Tianshi (CHN)	11.911	11.659	
2	Fatehah Mustapa (MAS)			

==== Heat 2 ====
Rank	Athlete	1st race	2nd race	Decider
1	Lee Wai Sze (HKG)	11.961	11.639	
2	Lin Junhong (CHN)			

=== Finals ===
==== Bronze ====
Rank	Athlete	1st race	2nd race	Decider
1	Lin Junhong (CHN)	11.717	REL	11.754
2	Fatehah Mustapa (MAS)		11.836	

==== Gold ====
Rank	Athlete	1st race	2nd race	Decider
1	Lee Wai Sze (HKG)		11.250	11.121
2	Zhong Tianshi (CHN)	11.410	REL	

== Final standing ==
Rank	Athlete
1st place, gold medalist(s)	Lee Wai Sze (HKG)
2nd place, silver medalist(s)	Zhong Tianshi (CHN)
3rd place, bronze medalist(s)	Lin Junhong (CHN)
4	Fatehah Mustapa (MAS)
5	Lee Hye-jin (KOR)
6	Takako Ishii (JPN)
7	Kayono Maeda (JPN)
8	Lee Eun-ji (KOR)
9	Deborah Herold (IND)
10	Kezia Varghese (IND)
