= Cycling at the 2010 Asian Games – Women's sprint =

Women's sprint at the 2010 Asian Games
- Venue: Guangzhou Velodrome
- Date: 14–17 November 2010
- Competitors: 16 from 9 nations

Medalists
gold medal	Guo Shuang	China
silver medal	Lin Junhong	China
bronze medal	Lee Wai Sze	Hong Kong

The women's sprint competition at the 2010 Asian Games was held from 14 to 17 November at the Guangzhou Velodrome.

== Schedule ==
All times are China Standard Time (UTC+08:00)

Date	Time	Event
Sunday, 14 November 2010	14:36	Qualifying
Sunday, 14 November 2010	17:03	1/8 finals
Sunday, 14 November 2010	17:39	Repechages 1/8
Monday, 15 November 2010	11:29	Quarterfinals
Tuesday, 16 November 2010	10:06	Semifinals
Wednesday, 17 November 2010	10:06	Finals
Wednesday, 17 November 2010	10:17	Race 5th–8th

== Records ==
Prior to this competition, the existing world, Asian and Games records were as follows.

World Record	Simona Krupeckaitė (LTU)	10.793	Moscow, Russia	29 May 2010
Asian Record	Guo Shuang (CHN)	10.918	Ballerup, Denmark	26 March 2010
Games Record	Guo Shuang (CHN)	11.319	Doha, Qatar	11 December 2006

== Results ==
Legend

- DNF — Did not finish
- REL — Relegated

=== Qualifying ===
Rank	Athlete	Time	Notes
1	Guo Shuang (CHN)	10.958	GR
2	Lin Junhong (CHN)	11.100	
3	Lee Wai Sze (HKG)	11.418	
4	Lee Eun-ji (KOR)	11.588	
5	Kim Won-gyeong (KOR)	11.600	
6	Huang Ting-ying (TPE)	11.672	
7	Hsiao Mei-yu (TPE)	11.711	
8	Meng Zhaojuan (HKG)	11.730	
9	Fatehah Mustapa (MAS)	11.872	
10	Jutatip Maneephan (THA)	11.881	
11	Kayono Maeda (JPN)	11.954	
12	Chanakan Srichaum (THA)	12.424	
13	Apryl Eppinger (PHI)	12.624	
14	Sakiko Numabe (JPN)	12.744	
15	Rameshwori Devi (IND)	12.918	
16	Rejani Vijaya Kumari (IND)	13.607	

=== 1/8 finals ===
==== Heat 1 ====
Rank	Athlete	Time
1	Guo Shuang (CHN)	12.107
2	Chanakan Srichaum (THA)	

==== Heat 2 ====
Rank	Athlete	Time
1	Lin Junhong (CHN)	11.920
2	Kayono Maeda (JPN)	

==== Heat 3 ====
Rank	Athlete	Time
1	Lee Wai Sze (HKG)	12.301
2	Jutatip Maneephan (THA)	

==== Heat 4 ====
Rank	Athlete	Time
1	Fatehah Mustapa (MAS)	12.122
2	Lee Eun-ji (KOR)	

==== Heat 5 ====
Rank	Athlete	Time
1	Kim Won-gyeong (KOR)	12.352
2	Meng Zhaojuan (HKG)	

==== Heat 6 ====
Rank	Athlete	Time
1	Huang Ting-ying (TPE)	12.795
2	Hsiao Mei-yu (TPE)	

=== Repechages 1/8 ===
==== Heat 1 ====
Rank	Athlete	Time
1	Lee Eun-ji (KOR)	12.533
2	Hsiao Mei-yu (TPE)	
3	Chanakan Srichaum (THA)	

==== Heat 2 ====
Rank	Athlete	Time
1	Meng Zhaojuan (HKG)	12.417
2	Jutatip Maneephan (THA)	
3	Kayono Maeda (JPN)	REL

=== Quarterfinals ===
==== Heat 1 ====
Rank	Athlete	Race 1	Race 2	Race 3
1	Guo Shuang (CHN)	12.101	11.904	
2	Meng Zhaojuan (HKG)			

==== Heat 2 ====
Rank	Athlete	Race 1	Race 2	Race 3
1	Lin Junhong (CHN)	12.061	12.577	
2	Lee Eun-ji (KOR)	DNF		

==== Heat 3 ====
Rank	Athlete	Race 1	Race 2	Race 3
1	Lee Wai Sze (HKG)	11.948	11.651	
2	Huang Ting-ying (TPE)			

==== Heat 4 ====
Rank	Athlete	Race 1	Race 2	Race 3
1	Kim Won-gyeong (KOR)	12.197	11.946	
2	Fatehah Mustapa (MAS)			

=== Race 5th–8th ===
Rank	Athlete	Time
1	Lee Eun-ji (KOR)	12.696
2	Fatehah Mustapa (MAS)	
3	Meng Zhaojuan (HKG)	
4	Huang Ting-ying (TPE)	

=== Semifinals ===
==== Heat 1 ====
Rank	Athlete	Race 1	Race 2	Race 3
1	Guo Shuang (CHN)	12.072	12.020	
2	Kim Won-gyeong (KOR)			

==== Heat 2 ====
Rank	Athlete	Race 1	Race 2	Race 3
1	Lin Junhong (CHN)	11.794	12.029	
2	Lee Wai Sze (HKG)			

=== Finals ===
==== Bronze ====
Rank	Athlete	Race 1	Race 2	Race 3
1	Lee Wai Sze (HKG)	11.808	11.804	
2	Kim Won-gyeong (KOR)			

==== Gold ====
Rank	Athlete	Race 1	Race 2	Race 3
1	Guo Shuang (CHN)	11.412	11.719	
2	Lin Junhong (CHN)			

== Final standing ==
Rank	Athlete
1st place, gold medalist(s)	Guo Shuang (CHN)
2nd place, silver medalist(s)	Lin Junhong (CHN)
3rd place, bronze medalist(s)	Lee Wai Sze (HKG)
4	Kim Won-gyeong (KOR)
5	Lee Eun-ji (KOR)
6	Fatehah Mustapa (MAS)
7	Meng Zhaojuan (HKG)
8	Huang Ting-ying (TPE)
9	Hsiao Mei-yu (TPE)
10	Jutatip Maneephan (THA)
11	Kayono Maeda (JPN)
12	Chanakan Srichaum (THA)
13	Apryl Eppinger (PHI)
14	Sakiko Numabe (JPN)
15	Rameshwori Devi (IND)
16	Rejani Vijaya Kumari (IND)
