= Cycling at the 2014 Asian Games – Women's keirin =

Women's keirin at the 2014 Asian Games
- Venue: Incheon International Velodrome
- Date: 21 September 2014
- Competitors: 11 from 7 nations

Medalists
gold medal	Lee Wai Sze	Hong Kong
silver medal	Fatehah Mustapa	Malaysia
bronze medal	Zhong Tianshi	China

The women's keirin competition at the 2014 Asian Games was held on 21 September 2014 at the Incheon International Velodrome.

== Schedule ==
All times are Korea Standard Time (UTC+09:00)

Date	Time	Event
Sunday, 21 September 2014	16:00	First round
Sunday, 21 September 2014	17:18	Finals

== Results ==
Legend

- REL — Relegated

=== First round ===
==== Heat 1 ====
Rank	Athlete	Gap
1	Lee Wai Sze (HKG)	
2	Zhong Tianshi (CHN)	+0.096
3	Kim Won-gyeong (KOR)	+0.535
4	Kayono Maeda (JPN)	+0.622
5	Deborah Herold (IND)	+4.220

==== Heat 2 ====
Rank	Athlete	Gap
1	Lin Junhong (CHN)	
2	Fatehah Mustapa (MAS)	+0.001
3	Lee Hye-jin (KOR)	+0.032
4	Takako Ishii (JPN)	+0.139
5	Mahitha Mohan (IND)	+1.231
6	Jutatip Maneephan (THA)	REL

=== Finals ===
==== Final 7–11 ====
Rank	Athlete	Gap
1	Takako Ishii (JPN)	
2	Kayono Maeda (JPN)	+0.043
3	Deborah Herold (IND)	+0.301
4	Jutatip Maneephan (THA)	+0.424
5	Mahitha Mohan (IND)	+0.768

==== Final 1–6 ====
Rank	Athlete	Gap
1	Lee Wai Sze (HKG)	
2	Fatehah Mustapa (MAS)	+0.070
3	Zhong Tianshi (CHN)	+0.181
4	Lee Hye-jin (KOR)	+0.204
5	Kim Won-gyeong (KOR)	+0.409
6	Lin Junhong (CHN)	REL

== Final standing ==
Rank	Athlete
1st place, gold medalist(s)	Lee Wai Sze (HKG)
2nd place, silver medalist(s)	Fatehah Mustapa (MAS)
3rd place, bronze medalist(s)	Zhong Tianshi (CHN)
4	Lee Hye-jin (KOR)
5	Kim Won-gyeong (KOR)
6	Lin Junhong (CHN)
7	Takako Ishii (JPN)
8	Kayono Maeda (JPN)
9	Deborah Herold (IND)
10	Jutatip Maneephan (THA)
11	Mahitha Mohan (IND)
