= Cycling at the 2018 Asian Games – Women's keirin =

Women's keirin at the 2018 Asian Games
- Venue: Jakarta International Velodrome
- Date: 28 August 2018
- Competitors: 17 from 9 nations

Medalists
gold medal	Lee Wai Sze	Hong Kong
silver medal	Lee Hye-jin	South Korea
bronze medal	Zhong Tianshi	China

The women's keirin competition at the 2018 Asian Games was held on 28 August at the Jakarta International Velodrome.

== Schedule ==
All times are Western Indonesia Time (UTC+07:00)

Date	Time	Event
Tuesday, 28 August 2018	09:00	First round
Tuesday, 28 August 2018	10:09	First round repechage
Tuesday, 28 August 2018	16:00	Second round
Tuesday, 28 August 2018	16:41	Finals

== Results ==
Legend

- REL — Relegated

=== First round ===
==== Heat 1 ====
Rank	Athlete	Gap
1	Lee Wai Sze (HKG)	
2	Cho Sun-young (KOR)	+0.131
3	Anis Amira Rosidi (MAS)	+1.588
4	Deborah Herold (IND)	+1.796
5	Chang Yao (TPE)	+1.944

==== Heat 2 ====
Rank	Athlete	Gap
1	Lee Hye-jin (KOR)	
2	Zhong Tianshi (CHN)	+0.027
3	Jessica Lee (HKG)	+0.075
4	Riyu Ota (JPN)	+0.252
5	Elga Kharisma Novanda (INA)	+0.464
6	Watinee Luekajorn (THA)	+0.727

==== Heat 3 ====
Rank	Athlete	Gap
1	Crismonita Dwi Putri (INA)	
2	Lin Junhong (CHN)	+0.061
3	Farina Shawati Adnan (MAS)	+0.112
4	Pannaray Rasee (THA)	+0.117
5	Sonali Chanu (IND)	+0.350
6	Kayono Maeda (JPN)	+0.377

=== First round repechages ===
==== Heat 1 ====
Rank	Athlete	Gap
1	Riyu Ota (JPN)	
2	Elga Kharisma Novanda (INA)	+0.994
3	Anis Amira Rosidi (MAS)	+1.207
4	Sonali Chanu (IND)	+1.286
5	Pannaray Rasee (THA)	+7.448

==== Heat 2 ====
Rank	Athlete	Gap
1	Jessica Lee (HKG)	
2	Chang Yao (TPE)	+0.107
3	Farina Shawati Adnan (MAS)	+0.209
4	Kayono Maeda (JPN)	+0.769
5	Deborah Herold (IND)	+1.112
6	Watinee Luekajorn (THA)	+1.953

=== Second round ===
==== Heat 1 ====
Rank	Athlete	Gap
1	Lee Wai Sze (HKG)	
2	Zhong Tianshi (CHN)	+0.068
3	Cho Sun-young (KOR)	+0.383
4	Riyu Ota (JPN)	+0.468
5	Elga Kharisma Novanda (INA)	+1.213
6	Farina Shawati Adnan (MAS)	REL

==== Heat 2 ====
Rank	Athlete	Gap
1	Lee Hye-jin (KOR)	
2	Jessica Lee (HKG)	+0.201
3	Lin Junhong (CHN)	+0.284
4	Crismonita Dwi Putri (INA)	+0.285
5	Anis Amira Rosidi (MAS)	+0.340
6	Chang Yao (TPE)	+0.550

=== Finals ===
==== Final 7–12 ====
Rank	Athlete	Gap
1	Crismonita Dwi Putri (INA)	
2	Riyu Ota (JPN)	+0.035
3	Farina Shawati Adnan (MAS)	+0.136
4	Chang Yao (TPE)	+0.618
5	Elga Kharisma Novanda (INA)	+0.626
6	Anis Amira Rosidi (MAS)	+0.895

==== Final 1–6 ====
Rank	Athlete	Gap
1	Lee Wai Sze (HKG)	
2	Lee Hye-jin (KOR)	+0.024
3	Zhong Tianshi (CHN)	+0.355
4	Jessica Lee (HKG)	+0.361
5	Cho Sun-young (KOR)	+0.548
6	Lin Junhong (CHN)	+2.342

== Final standing ==
Rank	Athlete
1st place, gold medalist(s)	Lee Wai Sze (HKG)
2nd place, silver medalist(s)	Lee Hye-jin (KOR)
3rd place, bronze medalist(s)	Zhong Tianshi (CHN)
4	Jessica Lee (HKG)
5	Cho Sun-young (KOR)
6	Lin Junhong (CHN)
7	Crismonita Dwi Putri (INA)
8	Riyu Ota (JPN)
9	Farina Shawati Adnan (MAS)
10	Chang Yao (TPE)
11	Elga Kharisma Novanda (INA)
12	Anis Amira Rosidi (MAS)
13	Sonali Chanu (IND)
13	Kayono Maeda (JPN)
15	Deborah Herold (IND)
15	Pannaray Rasee (THA)
17	Watinee Luekajorn (THA)
