= 2012 UCI Track Cycling World Championships – Women's sprint =

Women's sprint at the 2012 UCI Track Cycling World Championships
- Venue: Hisense Arena, Melbourne
- Date: 5–6 April 2012
- Competitors: 29 from 19 nations

Medalists
gold medal	Victoria Pendleton	Great Britain
silver medal	Simona Krupeckaitė	Lithuania
bronze medal	Anna Meares	Australia

Rainbow jersey

The Women's sprint at the 2012 UCI Track Cycling World Championships was held on April 5–6. 29 cyclists participated in the contest.

== Results ==
=== Qualifying ===
The Qualifying was held at 13:30, the top 24 riders qualified for the next round.

Rank	Name	Nation	Time	Notes
1	Anna Meares	Australia	10.782	Q, WR
2	Guo Shuang	China	11.004	Q
3	Miriam Welte	Germany	11.033	Q
4	Lee Wai Sze	Hong Kong	11.067	Q
5	Victoria Pendleton	Great Britain	11.076	Q
6	Kristina Vogel	Germany	11.078	Q
7	Simona Krupeckaitė	Lithuania	11.079	Q
8	Jessica Varnish	Great Britain	11.090	Q
9	Monique Sullivan	Canada	11.101	Q
10	Kaarle McCulloch	Australia	11.105	Q
11	Lyubov Shulika	Ukraine	11.131	Q
12	Lisandra Guerra	Cuba	11.150	Q
13	Natasha Hansen	New Zealand	11.166	Q
14	Viktoria Baranova	Russia	11.170	Q
15	Sandie Clair	France	11.186	Q
16	Lee Hye-Jin	South Korea	11.228	Q
17	Lin Junhong	China	11.244	Q
18	Zhong Tianshi	China	11.252	Q
19	Daniela Larreal	Venezuela	11.267	Q
20	Yvonne Hijgenaar	Netherlands	11.302	Q
21	Virginie Cueff	France	11.386	Q
22	Kayono Maeda	Japan	11.402	Q
23	Ekaterina Gnidenko	Russia	11.458	Q
24	Juliana Gaviria	Colombia	11.469	Q
25	Fatehah Mustapa	Malaysia	11.487	
26	Elena Brezhniva	Russia	11.508	
27	Hiroko Ishii	Japan	11.800	
28	Maryia Lohvinava	Belarus	11.984	
29	Iryna Papezhuk	Ukraine	12.135	

=== Finals ===
==== 1/16 Finals ====
The 1/16 Finals were held at 14:20.

Heat	Rank	Name	Nation	Time	Notes
1	1	Anna Meares	Australia	12.041	Q
1	2	Juliana Gaviria	Colombia		
2	1	Guo Shuang	China	11.733	Q
2	2	Ekaterina Gnidenko	Russia		
3	1	Miriam Welte	Germany	11.842	Q
3	2	Kayono Maeda	Japan		
4	1	Virginie Cueff	France	11.895	Q
4	2	Lee Wai Sze	Hong Kong		
5	1	Victoria Pendleton	Great Britain	11.618	Q
5	2	Yvonne Hijgenaar	Netherlands		
6	1	Daniela Larreal	Venezuela	11.850	Q
6	2	Kristina Vogel	Germany		
7	1	Simona Krupeckaitė	Lithuania	12.023	Q
7	2	Zhong Tianshi	China		
8	1	Lin Junhong	China	11.901	Q
8	2	Jessica Varnish	Great Britain		
9	1	Lee Hye-Jin	South Korea	11.741	Q
9	2	Monique Sullivan	Canada		
10	1	Sandie Clair	France	11.681	Q
10	2	Kaarle McCulloch	Australia		
11	1	Lyubov Shulika	Ukraine	11.462	Q
11	2	Viktoria Baranova	Russia		
12	1	Lisandra Guerra	Cuba	11.612	Q
12	2	Natasha Hansen	New Zealand		

==== 1/8 Finals ====
The 1/8 Finals were held at 16:15.

Heat	Rank	Name	Nation	Time	Notes
1	1	Anna Meares	Australia	11.568	Q
1	2	Lisandra Guerra	Cuba		
2	1	Lyubov Shulika	Ukraine	11.383	Q
2	2	Guo Shuang	China		
3	1	Miriam Welte	Germany	11.505	Q
3	2	Sandie Clair	France		
4	1	Virginie Cueff	France	11.901	Q
4	2	Lee Hye-Jin	South Korea		
5	1	Victoria Pendleton	Great Britain	11.852	Q
5	2	Lin Junhong	China		
6	1	Simona Krupeckaitė	Lithuania	11.398	Q
6	2	Daniela Larreal	Venezuela		

==== Repechage ====
The 1/8 Finals Repechage were held at 17:10.

Heat	Rank	Name	Nation	Time	Notes
1	1	Lisandra Guerra	Cuba	11.635	Q
1	2	Lee Hye-Jin	South Korea		
1	3	Daniela Larreal	Venezuela		
2	1	Guo Shuang	China	11.821	Q
2	2	Lin Junhong	China		
2	3	Sandie Clair	France		

==== Quarterfinals ====
The quarterfinals were held at 19:00 and 19:30.

Heat	Rank	Name	Nation	Race 1	Race 2	Decider	Notes
1	1	Anna Meares	Australia	11.491	11.591		Q
1	2	Guo Shuang	China				
2	1	Lyubov Shulika	Ukraine	11.806	11.588		Q
2	2	Lisandra Guerra	Cuba				
3	1	Simona Krupeckaitė	Lithuania	11.536	11.616		Q
3	2	Miriam Welte	Germany				
4	1	Victoria Pendleton	Great Britain	11.732	11.739		Q
4	2	Virginie Cueff	France				

==== Race 5th–8th Place ====
The race for 5th–8th Places was held at 22:00.

Rank	Name	Nation	Time
5	Guo Shuang	China	11.925
6	Miriam Welte	Germany	
7	Virginie Cueff	France	
8	Lisandra Guerra	Cuba	

==== Semifinals ====
The semifinals were held at 19:00, 19:40 and 20:15.

Heat	Rank	Name	Nation	Race 1	Race 2	Decider	Notes
1	1	Victoria Pendleton	Great Britain	DNF	11.337	11.526	Q
1	2	Anna Meares	Australia	11.278	REL		
2	1	Simona Krupeckaitė	Lithuania	11.674	11.911		Q
2	2	Lyubov Shulika	Ukraine				

==== Small Final ====
The finals were held at 20:45 and 21:35.

Rank	Name	Nation	Race 1	Race 2	Decider	Notes
3rd place, bronze medalist(s)	Anna Meares	Australia	11.376	11.343		
4	Lyubov Shulika	Ukraine				

==== Final ====
Rank	Name	Nation	Race 1	Race 2	Decider	Notes
1st place, gold medalist(s)	Victoria Pendleton	Great Britain	11.603	11.711		
2nd place, silver medalist(s)	Simona Krupeckaitė	Lithuania		REL		
