= 2016 UCI Track Cycling World Championships – Women's sprint =

Women's sprint at the 2016 UCI Track Cycling World Championships
- Venue: Lee Valley VeloPark, London
- Date: 5–6 March
- Competitors: 33 from 19 nations

Medalists
gold medal	Zhong Tianshi	China
silver medal	Lin Junhong	China
bronze medal	Kristina Vogel	Germany

The Women's sprint event of the 2016 UCI Track Cycling World Championships was held on 5 and 6 March 2016. Zhong Tianshi of China won the gold medal.

== Results ==
=== Qualifying ===
The qualifying was started at 10:00.

Rank	Name	Nation	Time	Behind	Notes
1	Stephanie Morton	Australia	10.760		Q
2	Zhong Tianshi	China	10.779	+0.019	Q
3	Kristina Vogel	Germany	10.812	+0.052	Q
4	Anastasia Voynova	Russia	10.844	+0.084	Q
5	Lee Wai Sze	Hong Kong	10.888	+0.128	Q
6	Natasha Hansen	New Zealand	10.949	+0.189	Q
7	Laurine van Riessen	Netherlands	10.958	+0.198	Q
8	Elis Ligtlee	Netherlands	10.958	+0.198	Q
9	Lin Junhong	China	10.963	+0.203	Q
10	Anna Meares	Australia	11.013	+0.253	Q
11	Katy Marchant	Great Britain	11.046	+0.286	Q
12	Kaarle McCulloch	Australia	11.047	+0.287	Q
13	Kate O'Brien	Canada	11.056	+0.296	Q
14	Virginie Cueff	France	11.078	+0.318	Q
15	Gong Jinjie	China	11.094	+0.334	Q
16	Miriam Welte	Germany	11.107	+0.347	Q
17	Jessica Varnish	Great Britain	11.110	+0.350	Q
18	Olga Panarina	Azerbaijan	11.143	+0.383	Q
19	Emma Hinze	Germany	11.209	+0.449	Q
20	Tania Calvo	Spain	11.231	+0.471	Q
21	Juliana Gaviria	Colombia	11.284	+0.524	Q
22	Daria Shmeleva	Russia	11.296	+0.536	Q
23	Lyubov Shulika	Ukraine	11.299	+0.539	Q
24	Luz Gaxiola	Mexico	11.312	+0.552	Q
25	Fatehah Mustapa	Malaysia	11.334	+0.574	
26	Martha Bayona	Colombia	11.336	+0.576	
27	Monique Sullivan	Canada	11.409	+0.649	
28	Helena Casas	Spain	11.467	+0.707	
29	Sandie Clair	France	11.498	+0.738	
30	Lisandra Guerra	Cuba	11.532	+0.772	
31	Kayono Maeda	Japan	11.564	+0.804	
32	Miglė Marozaitė	Lithuania	11.576	+0.816	
33	Takako Ishii	Japan	11.801	+1.041	

=== 1/16 finals ===
The 1/16 finals were started at 11:06.

Heat	Rank	Name	Nation	Gap	Notes
1	1	Stephanie Morton	Australia		Q
1	2	Luz Gaxiola	Mexico	+0.236	
2	1	Zhong Tianshi	China		Q
2	2	Lyubov Shulika	Ukraine	+0.284	
3	1	Kristina Vogel	Germany		Q
3	2	Daria Shmeleva	Russia	+0.187	
4	1	Anastasia Voynova	Russia		Q
4	2	Juliana Gaviria	Colombia	+0.104	
5	1	Lee Wai Sze	Hong Kong		Q
5	2	Tania Calvo	Spain	+0.088	
6	1	Natasha Hansen	New Zealand		Q
6	2	Emma Hinze	Germany	+0.084	
7	1	Laurine van Riessen	Netherlands		Q
7	2	Olga Panarina	Azerbaijan	+0.081	
8	1	Jessica Varnish	Great Britain		Q
8	2	Elis Ligtlee	Netherlands	+0.091	
9	1	Lin Junhong	China		Q
9	2	Miriam Welte	Germany	+0.281	
10	1	Anna Meares	Australia		Q
10	2	Gong Jinjie	China	+0.157	
11	1	Virginie Cueff	France		Q
11	2	Katy Marchant	Great Britain	+0.281	
12	1	Kate O'Brien	Canada		Q
12	2	Kaarle McCulloch	Australia	+0.072	

=== 1/8 finals ===
The 1/8 finals were started at 12:14.

Heat	Rank	Name	Nation	Gap	Notes
1	1	Stephanie Morton	Australia		Q
1	2	Kate O'Brien	Canada	+0.189	
2	1	Zhong Tianshi	China		Q
2	2	Virginie Cueff	France	+0.223	
3	1	Kristina Vogel	Germany		Q
3	2	Anna Meares	Australia	+0.290	
4	1	Lin Junhong	China		Q
4	2	Anastasia Voynova	Russia	+0.023	
5	1	Lee Wai Sze	Hong Kong		Q
5	2	Jessica Varnish	Great Britain	+0.151	
6	1	Natasha Hansen	New Zealand		Q
6	2	Laurine van Riessen	Netherlands	+0.021	

=== 1/8 finals repechage ===
The 1/8 finals repechage was started at 12:24.

Heat	Rank	Name	Nation	Gap	Notes
1	1	Kate O'Brien	Canada		Q
1	2	Anastasia Voynova	Russia		
1	3	Laurine van Riessen	Netherlands	+0.103	
2	1	Anna Meares	Australia		Q
2	2	Virginie Cueff	France	+0.052	
2	3	Jessica Varnish	Great Britain	+0.251	

=== Quarterfinals ===
Race 1 was started at 10:00, Race 2 was started at 10:41.

Heat	Rank	Name	Nation	Race 1	Race 2	Decider	Notes
1	1	Anna Meares	Australia	X	+0.063	X	Q
1	2	Stephanie Morton	Australia	+0.050	X	+0.093	
2	1	Zhong Tianshi	China	X	X		Q
2	2	Kate O'Brien	Canada	+0.122	+0.171		
3	1	Kristina Vogel	Germany	X	X		Q
3	2	Natasha Hansen	New Zealand	+0.395	+0.122		
4	1	Lin Junhong	China	X	X		Q
4	2	Lee Wai Sze	Hong Kong	+0.024	+0.028		

=== Race for 5th–8th places ===
The race for 5th–8th places was held at 11:55.

Rank	Name	Nation	Gap
5	Natasha Hansen	New Zealand	
6	Kate O'Brien	Canada	+0.100
7	Lee Wai Sze	Hong Kong	+0.155
8	Stephanie Morton	Australia	+0.221

=== Semifinals ===
Race 1 was held at 14:08 and Race 2 at 14:28.

Heat	Rank	Name	Nation	Race 1	Race 2	Decider	Notes
1	1	Lin Junhong	China	X	X		Q
1	2	Anna Meares	Australia	+0.027	+0.075		
2	1	Zhong Tianshi	China	X	X		Q
2	2	Kristina Vogel	Germany	+0.009	+0.014		

=== Finals ===
Race 1 was held at 15:35 and Race 2 at 16:00.

Rank	Name	Nation	Race 1	Race 2	Decider
Gold Medal Races
1st place, gold medalist(s)	Zhong Tianshi	China	X	X	
2nd place, silver medalist(s)	Lin Junhong	China	+0.020	+0.656	
Bronze Medal Races
3rd place, bronze medalist(s)	Kristina Vogel	Germany	X	X	
4	Anna Meares	Australia	+0.166	+0.071	
