= Cycling at the 2018 Asian Games – Women's sprint =

Women's sprint at the 2018 Asian Games
- Venue: Jakarta International Velodrome
- Date: 30–31 August 2018
- Competitors: 16 from 9 nations

Medalists
gold medal	Lee Wai Sze	Hong Kong
silver medal	Lee Hye-jin	South Korea
bronze medal	Cho Sun-young	South Korea

The women's sprint competition at the 2018 Asian Games was held on 30 and 31 August at the Jakarta International Velodrome.

== Schedule ==
All times are Western Indonesia Time (UTC+07:00)

Date	Time	Event
Thursday, 30 August 2018	09:20	Qualifying
Thursday, 30 August 2018	10:37	1/8 finals
Friday, 31 August 2018	09:00	Quarterfinals
Friday, 31 August 2018	10:14	Semifinals
Friday, 31 August 2018	14:02	Finals

== Records ==
Prior to this competition, the existing world, Asian and Games records were as follows.

World Record	Kristina Vogel (GER)	10.384	Aguascalientes, Mexico	7 December 2013
Asian Record	Zhong Tianshi (CHN)	10.573	Aguascalientes, Mexico	18 January 2013
Games Record	Zhong Tianshi (CHN)	10.780	Incheon, South Korea	23 September 2014

== Results ==
=== Qualifying ===
Rank	Athlete	Time	Notes
1	Lee Wai Sze (HKG)	10.583	GR
2	Lee Hye-jin (KOR)	10.815	
3	Zhong Tianshi (CHN)	10.840	
4	Cho Sun-young (KOR)	10.957	
5	Jessica Lee (HKG)	11.027	
6	Lin Junhong (CHN)	11.103	
7	Crismonita Dwi Putri (INA)	11.139	
8	Kayono Maeda (JPN)	11.305	
9	Riyu Ota (JPN)	11.360	
10	Farina Shawati Adnan (MAS)	11.623	
11	Chang Yao (TPE)	11.659	
12	Deborah Herold (IND)	11.775	
13	Anis Amira Rosidi (MAS)	11.858	
14	Watinee Luekajorn (THA)	11.962	
15	Pannaray Rasee (THA)	12.117	
16	Alena Reji (IND)	12.339	

=== 1/8 finals ===
==== Heat 1 ====
Rank	Athlete	Gap
1	Lee Wai Sze (HKG)	
2	Alena Reji (IND)	+0.852

==== Heat 2 ====
Rank	Athlete	Gap
1	Lee Hye-jin (KOR)	
2	Pannaray Rasee (THA)	+0.867

==== Heat 3 ====
Rank	Athlete	Gap
1	Zhong Tianshi (CHN)	
2	Watinee Luekajorn (THA)	+0.334

==== Heat 4 ====
Rank	Athlete	Gap
1	Cho Sun-young (KOR)	
2	Anis Amira Rosidi (MAS)	+0.351

==== Heat 5 ====
Rank	Athlete	Gap
1	Jessica Lee (HKG)	
2	Deborah Herold (IND)	+0.703

==== Heat 6 ====
Rank	Athlete	Gap
1	Lin Junhong (CHN)	
2	Chang Yao (TPE)	+0.102

==== Heat 7 ====
Rank	Athlete	Gap
1	Crismonita Dwi Putri (INA)	
2	Farina Shawati Adnan (MAS)	+0.204

==== Heat 8 ====
Rank	Athlete	Gap
1	Riyu Ota (JPN)	
2	Kayono Maeda (JPN)	+0.246

=== Quarterfinals ===
==== Heat 1 ====
Rank	Athlete	1st race	2nd race	Decider
1	Lee Wai Sze (HKG)			
2	Riyu Ota (JPN)	+0.183	+0.175	

==== Heat 2 ====
Rank	Athlete	1st race	2nd race	Decider
1	Lee Hye-jin (KOR)			
2	Crismonita Dwi Putri (INA)	+0.084	+0.084	

==== Heat 3 ====
Rank	Athlete	1st race	2nd race	Decider
1	Zhong Tianshi (CHN)			
2	Lin Junhong (CHN)	+0.092	+0.118	

==== Heat 4 ====
Rank	Athlete	1st race	2nd race	Decider
1	Cho Sun-young (KOR)		+0.037	
2	Jessica Lee (HKG)	+0.123		+0.042

=== Semifinals ===
==== Heat 1 ====
Rank	Athlete	1st race	2nd race	Decider
1	Lee Wai Sze (HKG)			
2	Cho Sun-young (KOR)	+0.623	+0.522	

==== Heat 2 ====
Rank	Athlete	1st race	2nd race	Decider
1	Lee Hye-jin (KOR)	+0.000		
2	Zhong Tianshi (CHN)		+0.004	+0.077

=== Finals ===
==== Bronze ====
Rank	Athlete	1st race	2nd race	Decider
1	Cho Sun-young (KOR)	+0.080		
2	Zhong Tianshi (CHN)		+0.024	+0.011

==== Gold ====
Rank	Athlete	1st race	2nd race	Decider
1	Lee Wai Sze (HKG)			
2	Lee Hye-jin (KOR)	+0.473	+0.351	

== Final standing ==
Rank	Athlete
1st place, gold medalist(s)	Lee Wai Sze (HKG)
2nd place, silver medalist(s)	Lee Hye-jin (KOR)
3rd place, bronze medalist(s)	Cho Sun-young (KOR)
4	Zhong Tianshi (CHN)
5	Jessica Lee (HKG)
6	Lin Junhong (CHN)
7	Crismonita Dwi Putri (INA)
8	Riyu Ota (JPN)
9	Kayono Maeda (JPN)
10	Farina Shawati Adnan (MAS)
11	Chang Yao (TPE)
12	Deborah Herold (IND)
13	Anis Amira Rosidi (MAS)
14	Watinee Luekajorn (THA)
15	Pannaray Rasee (THA)
16	Alena Reji (IND)
