= Cycling at the 2022 Asian Games – Women's keirin =

Women's keirin at the 2022 Asian Games
- Venue: Chun'an Jieshou Sports Centre Velodrome
- Dates: 27 September 2023
- Competitors: 17 from 9 nations

Medalists
gold medal	Mina Sato	Japan
silver medal	Wang Lijuan	China
bronze medal	Zhang Linyin	China

The women's keirin event at the 2022 Asian Games was held on 28 and 29 September 2023.

== Schedule ==
All times are China Standard Time (UTC+08:00)

Date	Time	Event
Wednesday, 27 September 2023	10:26	First round
Wednesday, 27 September 2023	11:08	Repechages
Wednesday, 27 September 2023	15:00	Semifinals
Wednesday, 27 September 2023	16:06	Finals

== Results ==
Legend

- DNF — Did not finish
- REL — Relegated

=== First round ===
==== Heat 1 ====
Rank	Athlete	Gap
1	Mina Sato (JPN)	
2	Chen Ching-yun (TPE)	+0.178
3	Yeung Cho Yiu (HKG)	+0.284
4	Natthaporn Aphimot (THA)	+0.953
5	Shushikala Agashe (IND)	+1.087

==== Heat 2 ====
Rank	Athlete	Gap
1	Riyu Ota (JPN)	
2	Wang Lijuan (CHN)	+0.411
3	Triyasha Paul (IND)	+1.109
4	Nurul Izzah Izzati Asri (MAS)	+1.158
5	Lee Hye-jin (KOR)	REL
—	Wiji Lestari (INA)	DNF

==== Heat 3 ====
Rank	Athlete	Gap
1	Zhang Linyin (CHN)	
2	Ng Sze Wing (HKG)	+0.094
3	Cho Sun-young (KOR)	+0.226
4	Anis Amira Rosidi (MAS)	+0.251
5	Pannaray Rasee (THA)	+0.373
6	Wang Tzu-chun (TPE)	+0.462

=== Repechages ===
==== Heat 1 ====
Rank	Athlete	Gap
1	Lee Hye-jin (KOR)	
2	Nurul Izzah Izzati Asri (MAS)	+0.075
3	Anis Amira Rosidi (MAS)	+0.159
4	Yeung Cho Yiu (HKG)	+0.172
5	Wang Tzu-chun (TPE)	+0.613

==== Heat 2 ====
Rank	Athlete	Gap
1	Cho Sun-young (KOR)	
2	Pannaray Rasee (THA)	+0.066
3	Natthaporn Aphimot (THA)	+0.329
4	Wiji Lestari (INA)	+0.443
5	Shushikala Agashe (IND)	+0.491
6	Triyasha Paul (IND)	+0.889

=== Semifinals ===
==== Heat 1 ====
Rank	Athlete	Gap
1	Mina Sato (JPN)	
2	Wang Lijuan (CHN)	+0.107
3	Cho Sun-young (KOR)	+0.193
4	Nurul Izzah Izzati Asri (MAS)	+0.443
5	Natthaporn Aphimot (THA)	+0.629
6	Ng Sze Wing (HKG)	+0.676

==== Heat 2 ====
Rank	Athlete	Gap
1	Zhang Linyin (CHN)	
2	Lee Hye-jin (KOR)	+0.067
3	Riyu Ota (JPN)	+0.150
4	Anis Amira Rosidi (MAS)	+0.410
5	Pannaray Rasee (IND)	+0.450
6	Chen Ching-yun (TPE)	+0.593

=== Finals ===
==== Final 7–12 ====
Rank	Athlete	Gap
1	Anis Amira Rosidi (MAS)	
2	Nurul Izzah Izzati Asri (MAS)	+0.086
3	Pannaray Rasee (THA)	+0.089
4	Natthaporn Aphimot (THA)	+0.251
5	Chen Ching-yun (TPE)	+0.441
6	Ng Sze Wing (HKG)	+0.455

==== Final 1–6 ====
Rank	Athlete	Gap
1	Mina Sato (JPN)	
2	Wang Lijuan (CHN)	+0.070
3	Zhang Linyin (CHN)	+0.418
4	Lee Hye-jin (KOR)	+0.572
5	Cho Sun-young (KOR)	+0.801
6	Riyu Ota (JPN)	+0.882

== Final standing ==
Rank	Athlete
1st place, gold medalist(s)	Mina Sato (JPN)
2nd place, silver medalist(s)	Wang Lijuan (CHN)
3rd place, bronze medalist(s)	Zhang Linyin (CHN)
4	Lee Hye-jin (KOR)
5	Cho Sun-young (KOR)
6	Riyu Ota (JPN)
7	Anis Amira Rosidi (MAS)
8	Nurul Izzah Izzati Asri (MAS)
9	Pannaray Rasee (THA)
10	Natthaporn Aphimot (THA)
11	Chen Ching-yun (TPE)
12	Ng Sze Wing (HKG)
13	Yeung Cho Yiu (HKG)
13	Wiji Lestari (INA)
15	Shushikala Agashe (IND)
15	Wang Tzu-chun (TPE)
17	Triyasha Paul (IND)
