= Cycling at the 2018 Asian Games – Women's team sprint =

Women's team sprint at the 2018 Asian Games
- Venue: Jakarta International Velodrome
- Date: 27 August 2018
- Competitors: 18 from 8 nations

Medalists
gold medal	China; Lin Junhong, Zhong Tianshi
silver medal	Hong Kong; Li Yin Yin, Ma Wing Yu, Lee Wai Sze
bronze medal	South Korea; Kim Won-gyeong, Lee Hye-jin, Cho Sun-young

The women's team sprint competition at the 2018 Asian Games was held on 27 August at the Jakarta International Velodrome.

== Schedule ==
All times are Western Indonesia Time (UTC+07:00)

Date	Time	Event
Monday, 27 August 2018	13:00	Qualifying
Monday, 27 August 2018	15:44	Finals

== Results ==
=== Qualifying ===
Rank	Team	Time
1	China (CHN); Lin Junhong; Zhong Tianshi	32.936
2	Hong Kong (HKG); Ma Wing Yu; Lee Wai Sze	33.484
3	South Korea (KOR); Kim Won-gyeong; Cho Sun-young	33.620
4	Japan (JPN); Kayono Maeda; Riyu Ota	34.132
5	Indonesia (INA); Elga Kharisma Novanda; Crismonita Dwi Putri	34.453
6	Malaysia (MAS); Farina Shawati Adnan; Anis Amira Rosidi	35.261
7	India (IND); Deborah Herold; Sonali Chanu	35.305
8	Thailand (THA); Pannaray Rasee; Watinee Luekajorn	35.929

=== Finals ===
==== Bronze ====
Rank	Team	Time
3rd place, bronze medalist(s)	South Korea (KOR); Kim Won-gyeong; Lee Hye-jin	33.476
4	Japan (JPN); Kayono Maeda; Riyu Ota	33.911

==== Gold ====
Rank	Team	Time
1st place, gold medalist(s)	China (CHN); Lin Junhong; Zhong Tianshi	33.118
2nd place, silver medalist(s)	Hong Kong (HKG); Li Yin Yin; Ma Wing Yu	35.024
