= Cycling at the 2022 Asian Games – Women's sprint =

Women's sprint at the 2022 Asian Games
- Venue: Chun'an Jieshou Sports Centre Velodrome
- Dates: 28–29 September 2023
- Competitors: 17 from 9 nations

Medalists
gold medal	Mina Sato	Japan
silver medal	Yuan Liying	China
bronze medal	Riyu Ota	Japan

The men's sprint event at the 2022 Asian Games was held on 28 and 29 September 2023.

== Schedule ==
All times are China Standard Time (UTC+08:00)

Date	Time	Event
Thursday, 28 September 2023	10:30	Qualifying
Thursday, 28 September 2023	11:08	1/16 finals
Thursday, 28 September 2023	15:09	1/16 finals repechages
Thursday, 28 September 2023	16:39	1/8 finals
Thursday, 28 September 2023	17:44	1/8 finals repechages
Friday, 29 September 2023	14:18	Quarterfinals
Friday, 29 September 2023	18:00	Semifinals
Friday, 29 September 2023	18:06	Race for 5th–8th places
Friday, 29 September 2023	19:48	Finals

== Records ==
Prior to this competition, the existing world, Asian and Games records were as follows.

World Record	Kelsey Mitchell (CAN)	10.154	Cochabamba, Bolivia	4 September 2019
Asian Record	Lee Wai Sze (HKG)	10.387	Brisbane, Australia	14 December 2019
Games Record	Lee Wai Sze (HKG)	10.583	Jakarta, Indonesia	30 August 2018

== Results ==
=== Qualifying ===
Rank	Athlete	Time	Notes
1	Yuan Liying (CHN)	10.557	GR
2	Mina Sato (JPN)	10.587	
3	Guo Yufang (CHN)	10.625	
4	Riyu Ota (JPN)	10.648	
5	Lee Hye-jin (KOR)	11.053	
6	Nurul Izzah Izzati Asri (MAS)	11.101	
7	Anis Amira Rosidi (MAS)	11.194	
8	Ng Sze Wing (HKG)	11.230	
9	Yeung Cho Yiu (HKG)	11.291	
10	Hwang Hyeon-seo (KOR)	11.347	
11	Wang Tzu-chun (TPE)	11.489	
12	Pannaray Rasee (THA)	11.496	
13	Chen Ching-yun (TPE)	11.540	
14	Yaowaret Jitmat (THA)	11.581	
15	Triyasha Paul (IND)	11.616	
16	Wiji Lestari (INA)	11.727	
17	Mayuri Lute (IND)	11.787	

=== 1/16 finals ===
==== Heat 1 ====
Rank	Athlete	Gap
1	Yuan Liying (CHN)	
2	Wiji Lestari (INA)	+0.278

==== Heat 2 ====
Rank	Athlete	Gap
1	Mina Sato (JPN)	
2	Triyasha Paul (IND)	+0.722

==== Heat 3 ====
Rank	Athlete	Gap
1	Guo Yufang (CHN)	
2	Yaowaret Jitmat (THA)	+1.403

==== Heat 4 ====
Rank	Athlete	Gap
1	Riyu Ota (JPN)	
2	Chen Ching-yun (TPE)	+0.130

==== Heat 5 ====
Rank	Athlete	Gap
1	Lee Hye-jin (KOR)	
2	Pannaray Rasee (THA)	+0.016

==== Heat 6 ====
Rank	Athlete	Gap
1	Nurul Izzah Izzati Asri (MAS)	
2	Wang Tzu-chun (TPE)	+0.102

==== Heat 7 ====
Rank	Athlete	Gap
1	Anis Amira Rosidi (MAS)	
2	Hwang Hyeon-seo (KOR)	+0.110

==== Heat 8 ====
Rank	Athlete	Gap
1	Yeung Cho Yiu (HKG)	
2	Ng Sze Wing (HKG)	+0.051

=== 1/16 finals repechages ===
==== Heat 1 ====
Rank	Athlete	Gap
1	Ng Sze Wing (HKG)	
2	Wiji Lestari (INA)	+0.114

==== Heat 2 ====
Rank	Athlete	Gap
1	Hwang Hyeon-seo (KOR)	
2	Triyasha Paul (IND)	+0.056

==== Heat 3 ====
Rank	Athlete	Gap
1	Wang Tzu-chun (TPE)	
2	Yaowaret Jitmat (THA)	+0.135

==== Heat 4 ====
Rank	Athlete	Gap
1	Pannaray Rasee (THA)	
2	Chen Ching-yun (TPE)	+0.307

=== 1/8 finals ===
==== Heat 1 ====
Rank	Athlete	Gap
1	Yuan Liying (CHN)	
2	Pannaray Rasee (THA)	+0.069

==== Heat 2 ====
Rank	Athlete	Gap
1	Mina Sato (JPN)	
2	Wang Tzu-chun (TPE)	+0.805

==== Heat 3 ====
Rank	Athlete	Gap
1	Guo Yufang (CHN)	
2	Hwang Hyeon-seo (KOR)	+1.126

==== Heat 4 ====
Rank	Athlete	Gap
1	Riyu Ota (JPN)	
2	Ng Sze Wing (HKG)	+0.783

==== Heat 5 ====
Rank	Athlete	Gap
1	Lee Hye-jin (KOR)	
2	Yeung Cho Yiu (HKG)	+0.098

==== Heat 6 ====
Rank	Athlete	Gap
1	Anis Amira Rosidi (MAS)	
2	Nurul Izzah Izzati Asri (MAS)	+0.305

=== 1/8 finals repechages ===
==== Heat 1 ====
Rank	Athlete	Gap
1	Pannaray Rasee (THA)	
2	Ng Sze Wing (HKG)	+0.008
3	Yeung Cho Yiu (HKG)	+0.010

==== Heat 2 ====
Rank	Athlete	Gap
1	Nurul Izzah Izzati Asri (MAS)	
2	Hwang Hyeon-seo (KOR)	+0.436
3	Wang Tzu-chun (TPE)	+0.501

=== Quarterfinals ===
==== Heat 1 ====
Rank	Athlete	Rane 1	Race 2	Decider
1	Yuan Liying (CHN)			
2	Nurul Izzah Izzati Asri (MAS)	+0.959	+0.055	

==== Heat 2 ====
Rank	Athlete	Rane 1	Race 2	Decider
1	Mina Sato (JPN)			
2	Pannaray Rasee (THA)	+0.119	+0.153	

==== Heat 3 ====
Rank	Athlete	Rane 1	Race 2	Decider
1	Guo Yufang (CHN)			
2	Anis Amira Rosidi (MAS)	+2.668	+3.733	

==== Heat 4 ====
Rank	Athlete	Rane 1	Race 2	Decider
1	Riyu Ota (JPN)			
2	Lee Hye-jin (KOR)	+0.860	+0.065	

=== Race for 5th–8th places ===
Rank	Athlete	Gap
1	Nurul Izzah Izzati Asri (MAS)	
2	Lee Hye-jin (KOR)	+0.064
3	Anis Amira Rosidi (MAS)	+0.114
4	Pannaray Rasee (THA)	+0.158

=== Semifinals ===
==== Heat 1 ====
Rank	Athlete	Rane 1	Race 2	Decider
1	Yuan Liying (CHN)	+0.001		
2	Riyu Ota (JPN)		+0.068	+0.180

==== Heat 2 ====
Rank	Athlete	Rane 1	Race 2	Decider
1	Mina Sato (JPN)			
2	Guo Yufang (CHN)	+0.258	+0.184	

=== Finals ===
==== Bronze ====
Rank	Athlete	Rane 1	Race 2	Decider
1	Riyu Ota (JPN)	+0.122		
2	Guo Yufang (CHN)		REL	+0.041

==== Gold ====
Rank	Athlete	Rane 1	Race 2	Decider
1	Mina Sato (JPN)			
2	Yuan Liying (CHN)	+0.088	+0.789	

== Final standing ==
Rank	Athlete
1st place, gold medalist(s)	Mina Sato (JPN)
2nd place, silver medalist(s)	Yuan Liying (CHN)
3rd place, bronze medalist(s)	Riyu Ota (JPN)
4	Guo Yufang (CHN)
5	Nurul Izzah Izzati Asri (MAS)
6	Lee Hye-jin (KOR)
7	Anis Amira Rosidi (MAS)
8	Pannaray Rasee (THA)
9	Ng Sze Wing (HKG)
10	Yeung Cho Yiu (HKG)
11	Hwang Hyeon-seo (KOR)
12	Wang Tzu-chun (TPE)
13	Chen Ching-yun (TPE)
14	Yaowaret Jitmat (THA)
15	Triyasha Paul (IND)
16	Wiji Lestari (INA)
17	Mayuri Lute (IND)
