= 2014 UCI Track Cycling World Championships – Women's team sprint =

The Women's team sprint at the 2014 UCI Track Cycling World Championships was held on 26 February 2014. 22 cyclists from 11 countries participated in the contest. After all teams have contested qualifying, the fastest two squads advanced to the final and raced for the gold medal, while the teams ranked third and fourth, raced for the bronze medal.

== Medalists ==
Gold	Germany; Miriam Welte; Kristina Vogel
Silver	China; Lin Junhong; Zhong Tianshi
Bronze	Great Britain; Jessica Varnish; Rebecca James

== Results ==
=== Qualifying ===
The qualifying was started at 19:00.

Rank	Name	Nation	Time	Notes
1	Miriam Welte; Kristina Vogel	Germany	32.575	
2	Lin Junhong; Zhong Tianshi	China	32.941	
3	Jessica Varnish; Rebecca James	Great Britain	33.214	
4	Elena Brezhniva; Anastasiia Voinova	Russia	33.441	
5	Sandie Clair; Virginie Cueff	France	33.443	
6	Tania Calvo; Helena Casas	Spain	33.913	
7	Juliana Gaviria; Diana García	Colombia	34.185	
8	Olena Starikova; Olena Tsyos	Ukraine	34.961	
9	Frany Fong; Daniela Gaxiola	Mexico	35.003	
10	Takako Ishii; Yuka Kobayashi	Japan	35.584	
11	Elis Ligtlee; Shanne Braspennincx	Netherlands		REL

=== Finals ===
The finals were started at 20:25.

Rank	Name	Nation	Time	Notes
Gold medal race
1st place, gold medalist(s)	Miriam Welte; Kristina Vogel	Germany	32.440	
2nd place, silver medalist(s)	Lin Junhong; Zhong Tianshi	China	33.239	
Bronze medal race
3rd place, bronze medalist(s)	Jessica Varnish; Rebecca James	Great Britain	33.032	
4	Elena Brezhniva; Anastasiia Voinova	Russia	33.154	
