= 2014 UCI Track Cycling World Championships – Women's sprint =

2014 women's sprint competition

Women's sprint at the 2014 UCI Track Cycling World Championships
- Venue: Velódromo Alcides Nieto Patiño, Cali, Colombia
- Date: 28 February–1 March 2014
- Competitors: 25 from 15 nations

Medalists
gold medal	Kristina Vogel	Germany
silver medal	Zhong Tianshi	China
bronze medal	Lin Junhong	China

The Women's sprint at the 2014 UCI Track Cycling World Championships was held on 28 February and 1 March 2014. 25 cyclists participated in the contest.

== Results ==
=== Qualifying ===
The qualifying was held at 12:00.

Rank	Name	Nation	Time	Notes
1	Kristina Vogel	Germany	10.946	Q
2	Becky James	Great Britain	10.954	Q
3	Zhong Tianshi	China	10.962	Q
4	Lee Wai Sze	Hong Kong	10.997	Q
5	Victoria Williamson	Great Britain	10.999	Q
6	Jessica Varnish	Great Britain	11.045	Q
7	Anna Meares	Australia	11.045	Q
8	Lin Junhong	China	11.047	Q
9	Miriam Welte	Germany	11.064	Q
10	Virginie Cueff	France	11.110	Q
11	Stephanie Morton	Australia	11.112	Q
12	Lisandra Guerra	Cuba	11.129	Q
13	Tania Calvo	Spain	11.151	Q
14	Olivia Montauban	France	11.165	Q
15	Elis Ligtlee	Netherlands	11.176	Q
16	Olga Streltsova	Russia	11.218	Q
17	Fatehah Mustapa	Malaysia	11.221	Q
18	Anastasiia Voinova	Russia	11.224	Q
19	Kayono Maeda	Japan	11.330	Q
20	Diana García	Colombia	11.345	Q
21	Daniela Gaxiola	Mexico	11.543	Q
22	Helena Casas	Spain	11.627	Q
23	Shanne Braspennincx	Netherlands	11.638	Q
24	Olena Tsyos	Ukraine	11.674	Q
25	Frany Fong	Mexico	11.966	

=== 1/16 finals ===
The 1/16 finals were held at 13:00.

Heat	Rank	Name	Nation	Gap	Notes
1	1	Kristina Vogel	Germany		Q
1	2	Olena Tsyos	Ukraine	+0.121	
2	1	Becky James	Great Britain		Q
2	2	Shanne Braspennincx	Netherlands	+0.121	
3	1	Zhong Tianshi	China		Q
3	2	Helena Casas	Spain	+0.089	
4	1	Lee Wai Sze	Hong Kong		Q
4	2	Daniela Gaxiola	Mexico	+0.164	
5	1	Victoria Williamson	Great Britain		Q
5	2	Diana García	Colombia	+0.048	
6	1	Jessica Varnish	Great Britain		Q
6	2	Kayono Maeda	Japan	+0.535	
7	1	Anna Meares	Australia		Q
7	2	Anastasiia Voinova	Russia	+0.036	
8	1	Lin Junhong	China		Q
8	2	Fatehah Mustapa	Malaysia	+0.203	
9	1	Miriam Welte	Germany		Q
9	2	Olga Streltsova	Russia	+0.106	
10	1	Virginie Cueff	France		Q
10	2	Elis Ligtlee	Netherlands	+0.090	
11	1	Stephanie Morton	Australia		Q
11	2	Olivia Montauban	France	+0.028	
12	1	Tania Calvo	Spain		Q
12	2	Lisandra Guerra	Cuba	+0.031	

=== 1/8 finals ===
The 1/8 finals were held at 14:20.

Heat	Rank	Name	Nation	Gap	Notes
1	1	Kristina Vogel	Germany		Q
1	2	Tania Calvo	Spain	+0.331	
2	1	Becky James	Great Britain		Q
2	2	Stephanie Morton	Australia	+0.061	
3	1	Zhong Tianshi	China		Q
3	2	Virginie Cueff	France	+0.011	
4	1	Lee Wai Sze	Hong Kong		Q
4	2	Miriam Welte	Germany	+0.169	
5	1	Lin Junhong	China		Q
5	2	Victoria Williamson	Great Britain	+0.057	
6	1	Anna Meares	Australia		Q
6	2	Jessica Varnish	Great Britain	+0.007	

=== 1/8 finals repechage ===
The 1/8 finals repechages were held at 15:30.

Heat	Rank	Name	Nation	Gap	Notes
1	1	Jessica Varnish	Great Britain		Q
1	2	Tania Calvo	Spain	+0.022	
1	3	Miriam Welte	Germany	+0.359	
2	1	Stephanie Morton	Australia		Q
2	2	Virginie Cueff	France	+0.007	
2	3	Victoria Williamson	Great Britain	+0.229	

=== Quarterfinals ===
Race 1 was held at 19:20 and Race 2 at 20:00.

Heat	Rank	Name	Nation	Race 1	Race 2	Decider	Notes
1	1	Kristina Vogel	Germany	X	X		Q
1	2	Stephanie Morton	Australia	+0.092	+0.295		
2	1	Jessica Varnish	Great Britain	X	X		Q
2	2	Becky James	Great Britain	+0.026	+0.306		
3	1	Zhong Tianshi	China	X	X		Q
3	2	Anna Meares	Australia	+0.074	+0.051		
4	1	Lin Junhong	China	X	X		Q
4	2	Lee Wai Sze	Hong Kong	+0.031	+0.059		

=== Race for 5th–8th places ===
The race for 5th–8th places was held at 21:50.

Rank	Name	Nation	Gap
5	Becky James	Great Britain	
6	Stephanie Morton	Australia	+0.044
7	Anna Meares	Australia	+0.063
8	Lee Wai Sze	Hong Kong	+0.103

=== Semifinals ===
Race 1 was held at 18:30 and Race 2 at 18:55.

Heat	Rank	Name	Nation	Race 1	Race 2	Decider	Notes
1	1	Kristina Vogel	Germany	X	X		Q
1	2	Lin Junhong	China	+0.160	+0.018		
2	1	Zhong Tianshi	China	X	X		Q
2	2	Jessica Varnish	Great Britain	+0.019	+0.002		

=== Finals ===
Race 1 was held at 20:30, Race 2 at 20:55.

Rank	Name	Nation	Race 1	Race 2	Decider
Gold Medal Races
1st place, gold medalist(s)	Kristina Vogel	Germany	X	X	
2nd place, silver medalist(s)	Zhong Tianshi	China	+0.126	+0.048	
Bronze Medal Races
3rd place, bronze medalist(s)	Lin Junhong	China	X	X	
4	Jessica Varnish	Great Britain	+0.049	+0.026	
