= Great Britain at the UCI Track Cycling World Championships =

British Cycling has competed at the UCI Track Cycling World Championships frequently.

== 2015 ==
Great Britain at the 2015 UCI Track Cycling World Championships
- IOC code: GBR

in Saint-Quentin-en-Yvelines, France 18 February – 22 February 2015
- Competitors: 20
- Medals Ranked 10th: Gold 0 Silver 3 Bronze 0 Total 3

UCI Track Cycling World Championships appearances (overview)
- Overview page Recent: 2008; 2009; 2010; 2011; 2012; 2013; 2014; 2015; 2016; 2017; 2018; 2019; 2020; 2021; 2022; 2023; 2024; 2025

Great Britain competed at the 2015 UCI Track Cycling World Championships in Saint-Quentin-en-Yvelines at the Vélodrome de Saint-Quentin-en-Yvelines from 18 to 22 February 2015. A team of 20 cyclists (8 women, 12 men) was announced to represent the country in the event.

== Results ==
=== Men ===
Name	Event	Result	Rank
Eddie Dawkins	Men's sprint	9.681 (Q),	10
Jason Kenny	Men's sprint	9.804 (Q),	14
Callum Skinner	Men's sprint	9.983 (Q),	23
Callum Skinner	Men's 1 km time trial	1:01.071	7
Kian Emadi	Men's 1 km time trial	1:01.736	12
Andrew Tennant	Men's individual pursuit	4:20.733	5
Matthew Gibson	Men's scratch	—	6
Mark Christian	Men's points race	3 points	17
Jonathan Dibben	Men's omnium	123 points	12
Jason Kenny	Men's keirin		13
Jonathan Dibben; Owain Doull	Men's madison	2 points	8
Ed Clancy; Steven Burke; Owain Doull; Andrew Tennant	Men's team pursuit	3:57.716 (Q),	2nd place, silver medalist(s)
Philip Hindes; Jason Kenny; Callum Skinner	Men's team sprint	43.808	8

=== Women ===
Name	Event	Result	Rank
Jessica Varnish	Women's sprint	10.804 (Q),	8
Victoria Williamson	Women's sprint	10.935 (Q),	10
Jessica Varnish	Women's keirin		17
Katy Marchant	Women's 500 m time trial	34.633	13
Victoria Williamson	Women's 500 m time trial	34.904	15
Joanna Rowsell	Women's individual pursuit	3:31.171 (q), 3:36.330	4
Katie Archibald	Women's individual pursuit	3:31.276	5
Laura Trott	Women's omnium	176 points	2nd place, silver medalist(s)
Elinor Barker	Women's scratch	—	17
Katie Archibald; Laura Trott; Elinor Barker; Joanna Rowsell	Women's team pursuit	4:18.207 (Q),	2nd place, silver medalist(s)
Jessica Varnish; Victoria Williamson	Women's team sprint	33.583	8

Great Britain at the 2016 UCI Track Cycling World Championships
- IOC code: GBR

in London, United Kingdom 2 March – 6 March 2016
- Competitors: 21 (12 men, 9 women)
- Medals: Gold 1 Silver 1 Bronze 1 Total 3

UCI Track Cycling World Championships appearances (overview)
- Recent: 2008; 2009; 2010; 2011; 2012; 2013; 2014; 2015; 2016; 2017; 2018; 2019; 2020; 2021; 2022; 2023; 2024; 2025

Great Britain competed as the host nation at the 2016 UCI Track Cycling World Championships at the Lee Valley VeloPark in London from 2–4 March 2016. A team of 21 cyclists (9 women, 12 men) was announced to represent the country in the event.

== Riders ==
Katie Archibald, the 21-year-old reigning European champion, was named in the British squad but will miss the championships due to tearing a posterior cruciate ligament in December.

=== Men ===
Ages as of 2 March 2016

Bib	Cyclist	Date of birth (age)
191	Steven Burke	4 March 1988 (aged 27)
16	Mark Cavendish	21 May 1985 (aged 30)
192	Edward Clancy	12 March 1985 (aged 30)
193	Matthew Crampton	23 May 1986 (aged 29)
61	Jonathan Dibben	12 February 1994 (aged 22)
194	Owain Doull	2 May 1993 (aged 22)
195	Philip Hindes	22 September 1992 (aged 23)
196	Jason Kenny	23 March 1988 (aged 27)
197	Christopher Latham	6 February 1994 (aged 22)
198	Callum Skinner	20 August 1992 (aged 23)
199	Andrew Tennant	9 March 1987 (aged 28)
200	Bradley Wiggins	28 April 1980 (aged 35)

=== Women ===
Ages as of 2 March 2016

Bib	Cyclist	Date of birth (age)
201	Katie Archibald	12 March 1994 (aged 21)
202	Elinor Barker	7 September 1994 (aged 21)
203	Ciara Horne	17 September 1989 (aged 26)
204	Rebecca James	29 November 1991 (aged 24)
205	Katy Marchant	30 January 1993 (aged 23)
62	Emily Nelson	10 November 1996 (aged 19)
206	Joanna Rowsell-Shand	5 December 1988 (aged 27)
17	Laura Trott	24 April 1992 (aged 23)
207	Jessica Varnish	19 November 1990 (aged 25)

== Results ==
=== Men ===
Name	Event	Result	Rank
Jason Kenny	Men's sprint		1
Callum Skinner	Men's sprint		8
Matthew Crampton	Men's 1 km time trial	01:01.669	5
Andrew Tennant	Men's individual pursuit	258.944 (q), 258.301 (f)	4
Owain Doull	Men's individual pursuit	257.698 (q), 258.476 (f)	3
Jason Kenny	Men's keirin	—	6
Christopher Latham	Men's scratch	—	9
Jonathan Dibben	Men's points race	48 points	1
Philip Hindes; Jason Kenny; Callum Skinner	Men's team sprint	43.507	6
Jonathan Dibben; Steven Burke; Owain Doull; Bradley Wiggins; Steven Burke; Andy Tennant	Men's team pursuit		2
Bradley Wiggins; Mark Cavendish	Men's madison	21 points	1

=== Women ===
Name	Event	Result	Rank
Laura Trott	Women's scratch	—	1st place, gold medalist(s)
Becky James	Women's keirin	—	3rd place, bronze medalist(s)
Jessica Varnish	Women's sprint		12
Katy Marchant	Women's sprint		14
Katy Marchant	Women's 500 m time trial	34.032 sec	5
Emily Nelson	Women's points race	8 points	5
Laura Trott	Women's omnium	201 points	1
Laura Trott; Elinor Barker; Ciara Horne; Joanna Rowsell	Women's team pursuit	04:21.054 (q), 04:16.540 (f)	3
Jessica Varnish; Katy Marchant	Women's team sprint	32.903	5
