= Cycling at the 2022 Asian Games – Women's team sprint =

Women's cycling event

Women's team sprint at the 2022 Asian Games
- Venue: Chun'an Jieshou Sports Centre Velodrome
- Dates: 26 September 2023
- Competitors: 24 from 7 nations

Medalists
gold medal	China; Guo Yufang, Bao Shanju, Yuan Liying, Jiang Yulu
silver medal	South Korea; Hwang Hyeon-seo, Kim Ha-eun, Cho Sun-young, Lee Hye-jin
bronze medal	Malaysia; Nurul Aliana Syafika Azizan, Nurul Izzah Izzati Asri, Anis Amira Rosidi

The women's team sprint event at the 2022 Asian Games was held on 26 September 2023.

== Schedule ==
All times are China Standard Time (UTC+08:00)

Date	Time	Event
Tuesday, 26 September 2023	10:00	Qualifying
Tuesday, 26 September 2023	15:00	First round
Tuesday, 26 September 2023	16:16	Finals

== Records ==
Prior to this competition, the existing world, Asian and Games records were as follows.

World Record	Germany	45.848	Glasgow, United Kingdom	3 August 2023
Asian Record	China	46.446	Glasgow, United Kingdom	3 August 2023
Games Record	—	—	—	—

== Results ==
=== Qualifying ===
Rank	Team	Time	Notes
1	China (CHN); Guo Yufang; Bao Shanju; Jiang Yulu	47.413	GR
2	South Korea (KOR); Hwang Hyeon-seo; Lee Hye-jin; Cho Sun-young	49.621	
3	Malaysia (MAS); Nurul Aliana Syafika Azizan; Nurul Izzah Izzati Asri; Anis Amira Rosidi	49.937	
4	Chinese Taipei (TPE); Hsiao Mei-yu; Wang Tzu-chun; Chen Ching-yun	50.854	
5	Hong Kong (HKG); Ching Yin Shan; Yeung Cho Yiu; Ng Sze Wing	50.902	
6	Thailand (THA); Natthaporn Aphimot; Yaowaret Jitmat; Pannaray Rasee	51.927	
7	India (IND); Celestina Chelobroy; Triyasha Paul; Mayuri Lute	52.898	

=== First round ===
==== Heat 1 ====
Rank	Team	Time	Notes
1	Chinese Taipei (TPE); Hsiao Mei-yu; Wang Tzu-chun; Chen Ching-yun	50.027	
2	Hong Kong (HKG); Ching Yin Shan; Ng Sze Wing; Yeung Cho Yiu	50.681	

==== Heat 2 ====
Rank	Team	Time	Notes
1	Malaysia (MAS); Nurul Aliana Syafika Azizan; Nurul Izzah Izzati Asri; Anis Amira Rosidi	49.466	
2	Thailand (THA); Natthaporn Aphimot; Yaowaret Jitmat; Pannaray Rasee	50.881	

==== Heat 3 ====
Rank	Team	Time	Notes
1	South Korea (KOR); Hwang Hyeon-seo; Lee Hye-jin; Cho Sun-young	48.955	
2	India (IND); Celestina Chelobroy; Triyasha Paul; Shushikala Agashe	52.333	

==== Heat 4 ====
Rank	Team	Time	Notes
1	China (CHN); Guo Yufang; Bao Shanju; Yuan Liying	46.900	GR

==== Summary ====
Rank	Team	Time
1	China (CHN)	46.900
2	South Korea (KOR)	48.955
3	Malaysia (MAS)	49.466
4	Chinese Taipei (TPE)	50.027

=== Finals ===
==== Bronze ====
Rank	Team	Time	Notes
3rd place, bronze medalist(s)	Malaysia (MAS); Nurul Aliana Syafika Azizan; Nurul Izzah Izzati Asri; Anis Amira Rosidi	49.025	
4	Chinese Taipei (TPE); Hsiao Mei-yu; Wang Tzu-chun; Chen Ching-yun	50.344	

==== Gold ====
Rank	Team	Time	Notes
1st place, gold medalist(s)	China (CHN); Guo Yufang; Bao Shanju; Yuan Liying	46.376	AR
2nd place, silver medalist(s)	South Korea (KOR); Hwang Hyeon-seo; Kim Ha-eun; Cho Sun-young	50.012	
