= Lee Eun-ji (cyclist) =

South Korean cyclist (born 1989)

Lee Eun-ji (Korean: 이은지; born 11 December 1989) is a South Korean track cyclist. At the 2012 Summer Olympics, she competed in the Women's team sprint with Lee Hye-Jin for the national team.

== Major results ==
2015
Japan Track Cup

3rd Keirin
3rd Keirin

3rd Keirin, Yangyang International Track Competition
