= Chanakan Srichaum =

Thai cyclist (born 1991)

Chanakan Sricha-Um
Personal information
- Born: 17 January 1991 (age 35)

Cycling career
- Sport: Cycling
- Discipline: Track cycling
- Role: Rider
- Rider type: sprinter

Chanakan Sricha-Um (born 17 January 1991) is a Thai track cyclist, and part of the national team. She competed in the team sprint event at the 2010 UCI Track Cycling World Championships.
