= Cho Sun-young =

South Korean cyclist (born 1993)

Personal information
- Born: 22 April 1993 (age 33)

Cycling career
- Sport: Cycling
- Discipline: Track cycling
- Role: Rider
Medal record
Women's track cycling
Representing South Korea
Asian Games
| Silver medal – second place | 2022 Hangzhou | Team sprint |
| Bronze medal – third place | 2018 Jakarta-Palembang | Sprint |
| Bronze medal – third place | 2018 Jakarta-Palembang | Team sprint |
Asian Championships
| Gold medal – first place | 2022 New Delhi | Team sprint |
| Silver medal – second place | 2016 Izu | Team sprint |
| Bronze medal – third place | 2022 New Delhi | Sprint |
| Bronze medal – third place | 2023 Nilai | Team sprint |
| Bronze medal – third place | 2024 New Delhi | Team sprint |
| Bronze medal – third place | 2026 Tagaytay | Team sprint |

Cho Sun-young (Korean: 조선영; born 22 April 1993) is a South Korean female track cyclist. She won the silver medal in the team sprint at the 2016 Asian Cycling Championships.

== Career results ==
2015
2nd Sprint, Japan Track Cup
2nd Sprint, Yangyang International Track Competition
Track Asia Cup

2nd Keirin
2nd Sprint

2016
2nd Team Sprint, Asian Track Championships (with Lee Hye-jin)
2017
2nd 500m Time Trial, Asian Track Championships
