= Zhong Tianshi =

Chinese track cyclist

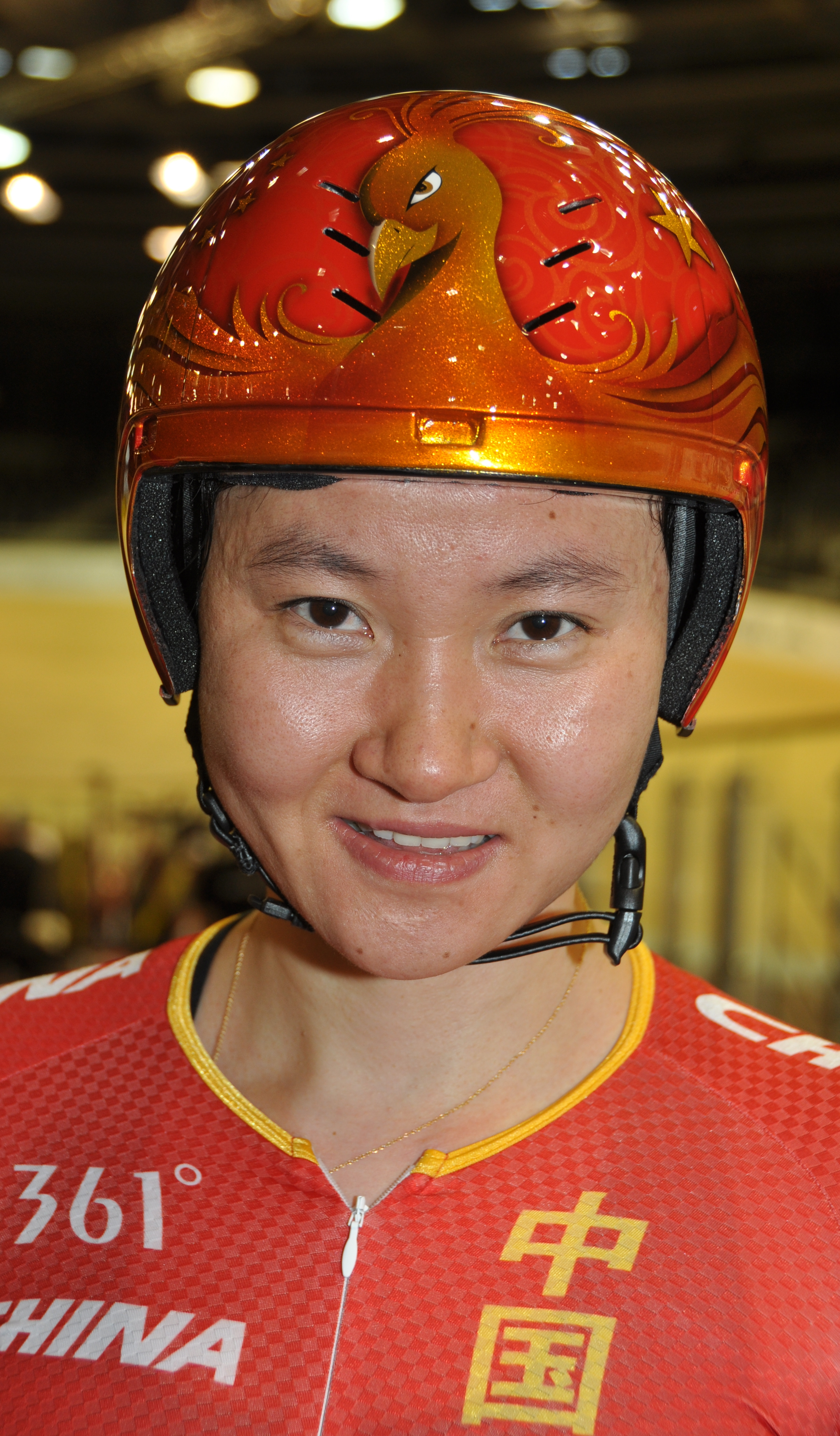
- Zhong Tianshi in 2018

Personal information
- Born: 2 February 1991 (age 35) Shanghai, China
- Height: 1.68 m (5 ft 6 in)
- Weight: 62 kg (137 lb)

Cycling career
- Sport: Cycling
- Discipline: Track cycling
- Role: Rider
Medal record
Women's track cycling
Representing China
Olympic Games
Gold medal – first place	2020 Tokyo	Team sprint
Gold medal – first place	2016 Rio de Janeiro	Team sprint
World Championships
Gold medal – first place	2015 Yvelines	Team sprint
Gold medal – first place	2016 London	Sprint
Silver medal – second place	2014 Cali	Team sprint
Silver medal – second place	2014 Cali	Sprint
Silver medal – second place	2016 London	Team sprint
Bronze medal – third place	2015 Yvelines	Sprint
Bronze medal – third place	2020 Berlin	Team sprint
Asian Games
Gold medal – first place	2014 Incheon	Team sprint
Gold medal – first place	2018 Jakarta-Palembang	Team sprint
Silver medal – second place	2014 Incheon	Sprint
Bronze medal – third place	2014 Incheon	Keirin
Bronze medal – third place	2018 Jakarta-Palembang	Keirin
Asian Championships
Gold medal – first place	2014 Astana	Team sprint
Gold medal – first place	2016 Izu	500 m time trial
Gold medal – first place	2016 Izu	Team sprint
Gold medal – first place	2018 Nilai	Team sprint
Gold medal – first place	2019 Jakarta	Team sprint
Silver medal – second place	2014 Astana	Sprint
Silver medal – second place	2018 Nilai	Sprint
Silver medal – second place	2019 Jakarta	Sprint
Silver medal – second place	2020 Jincheon	Sprint
Bronze medal – third place	2014 Astana	Keirin
Bronze medal – third place	2018 Nilai	Keirin
Bronze medal – third place	2019 Jakarta	Keirin

Zhong Tianshi (Chinese: 钟天使; pinyin: Zhōng Tiānshǐ, born 2 February 1991) is a Chinese track cyclist. She represented her nation at the 2012, 2014 and 2015 UCI Track Cycling World Championships. In 2015, she became world champion in the team sprint and won bronze in the sprint.

At the 2016 Summer Olympics in Rio de Janeiro, she and her partner Gong Jinjie established a world record of 31.928 seconds in the qualification round of the team sprint event, before sprinting their way towards a gold-medal triumph for the Chinese track cycling team in the final match against Russia.

On 2 August 2021, she teamed with Bao Shanju and defended her Olympic championship in the women's team sprint at the 2020 Summer Olympics in Tokyo, thus becoming the first Chinese cyclist to win two Olympic gold medals. During the first round, she and Bao set the new world record of 31.804 seconds. While being awarded at the medals ceremony, Zhong and her partner Bao were seen on top of the podium with Mao Zedong pin-badges affixed to their team sporting jackets, alluding to symbolic patriotism; however, according to Graham Dunbar and Joe McDonald at Associated Press, this symbolism may have been in breach of Olympic Charter Rule 50 (which prohibits political statements on the podium), and that this "incident came one day after silver medalist Raven Saunders (standing below gold medalist Gong Lijiao of China) crossed the wrists of her raised arms on the podium", to which Dunbar and McDonald further suggested that it may have been "a response to the (Gong/Saunders) women's shot-put medal ceremony".

== Major results ==
2014
Asian Track Championships

1st Team Sprint (with Lin Junhong)
2nd Sprint
3rd Keirin

Asian Games

1st Team Sprint (with Gong Jinjie)
2nd Sprint
3rd Keirin

1st Sprint, Hong Kong International Track Cup
1st Keirin, South Australian Track Classic
China Track Cup

1st Keirin
2nd Keirin
2nd Sprint

2nd Sprint, Adelaide Cycling Grand Prix
2nd Sprint, Super Drome Cup
2015
1st Sprint, Singen
1st Keirin, Oberhausen
1st Keirin, Öschelbronn
1st Sprint, Dudenhofen
Cottbuser SprintCup

1st Sprint
2nd 500m Time Trial

GP von Deutschland im Sprint

1st Sprint
1st Team Sprint (with Gong Jinjie)
3rd Keirin

China Track Cup

1st Keirin
1st Sprint
2nd Keirin

2016
Asian Track Championships

1st Team Sprint (with Gong Jinjie)
1st 500m Time Trial

2017
National Track Championships
1st Sprint

3rd Team Sprint (with Guo Shuang)

2nd Sprint, China Track Cup
2018
Asian Track Championships

2nd 500m Time Trial
