= Kim Won-gyeong =

South Korean cyclist (born 1990)

Kim Won-Gyeong
Personal information
- Born: 27 January 1990 (age 36)

Cycling career
- Sport: Cycling
- Discipline: Track cycling
- Role: Rider
- Rider type: sprinter

Kim Won-Gyeong (born 27 January 1990) is a South Korean female track cyclist. She competed in three events at the 2011 UCI Track Cycling World Championships.

== Major results ==
2014
Asian Track Championships

2nd Keirin
2nd Team Sprint (with Lee Hye-jin)

2nd Team Sprint, Asian Games (with Lee Hye-jin)
2015
Yangyang International Track Competition

1st Sprint
2nd Keirin

Track Asia Cup

1st Keirin
1st Team Sprint
1st 500m Time Trial (with Kim Soojin)

2016
Yangyang International Track Competition

1st Keirin
1st Sprint

2017
Asian Track Championships

1st Team Sprint (with Lee Hye-jin)
2nd Sprint
