= Takako Ishii =

Japanese cyclist (born 1990)

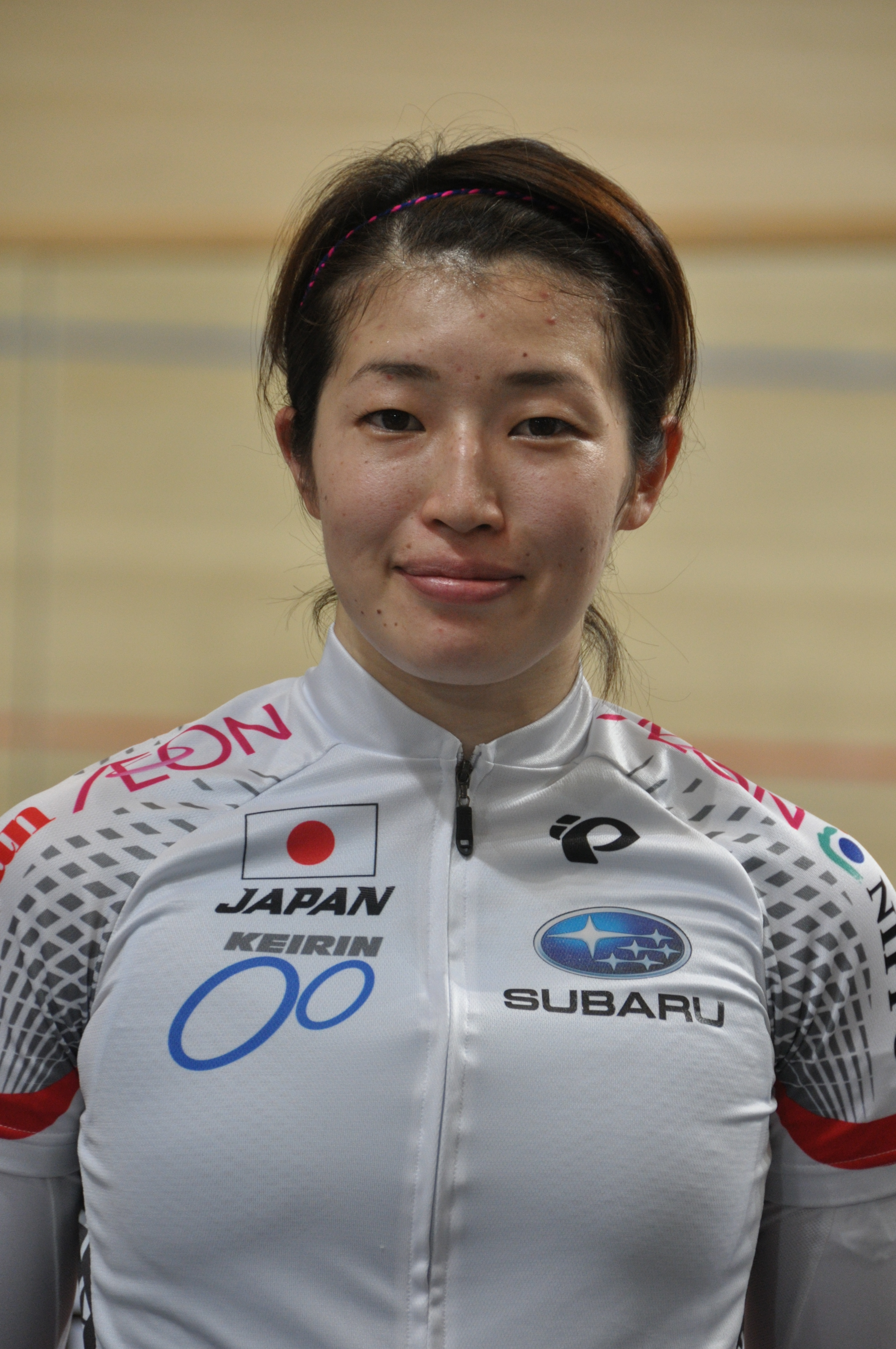
- Takako Ishii (2016)

Personal information
- Born: 17 February 1990 (age 36) Japan
- Height: 1.63 m (5 ft 4 in)

Cycling career
- Sport: Cycling
- Discipline: Track cycling

Takako Ishii (石井 貴子, Ishii Takako; born 17 February 1990) is a track cyclist from Japan. She represented her nation at the 2014 and 2015 UCI Track Cycling World Championships. She is also a professional keirin cyclist.

== Career results ==
2014
3rd Team Sprint, Asian Track Championships (with Kayono Maeda)
Japan Track Cup 1

3rd Keirin
3rd Sprint

2015

2nd Team Sprint, Asian Track Championships (with Kayono Maeda)

3rd Sprint, Japan Track Cup
2016
Track Clubs ACC Cup

1st 500m Time Trial
1st Sprint
1st Team Sprint (With Yumi Kajihara)

1st Keirin, Japan Track Cup
Taiwan Hsin-Chu Track International Classic

1st Keirin
1st Sprint
1st Keirin
3rd Sprint
3rd Team Sprint (with Kayono Maeda)

3rd Team Sprint, Asian Track Championships (with Kayono Maeda)
2017
3rd Sprint, National Track Championships
