= Lin Junhong =

Chinese cyclist (born 1990)

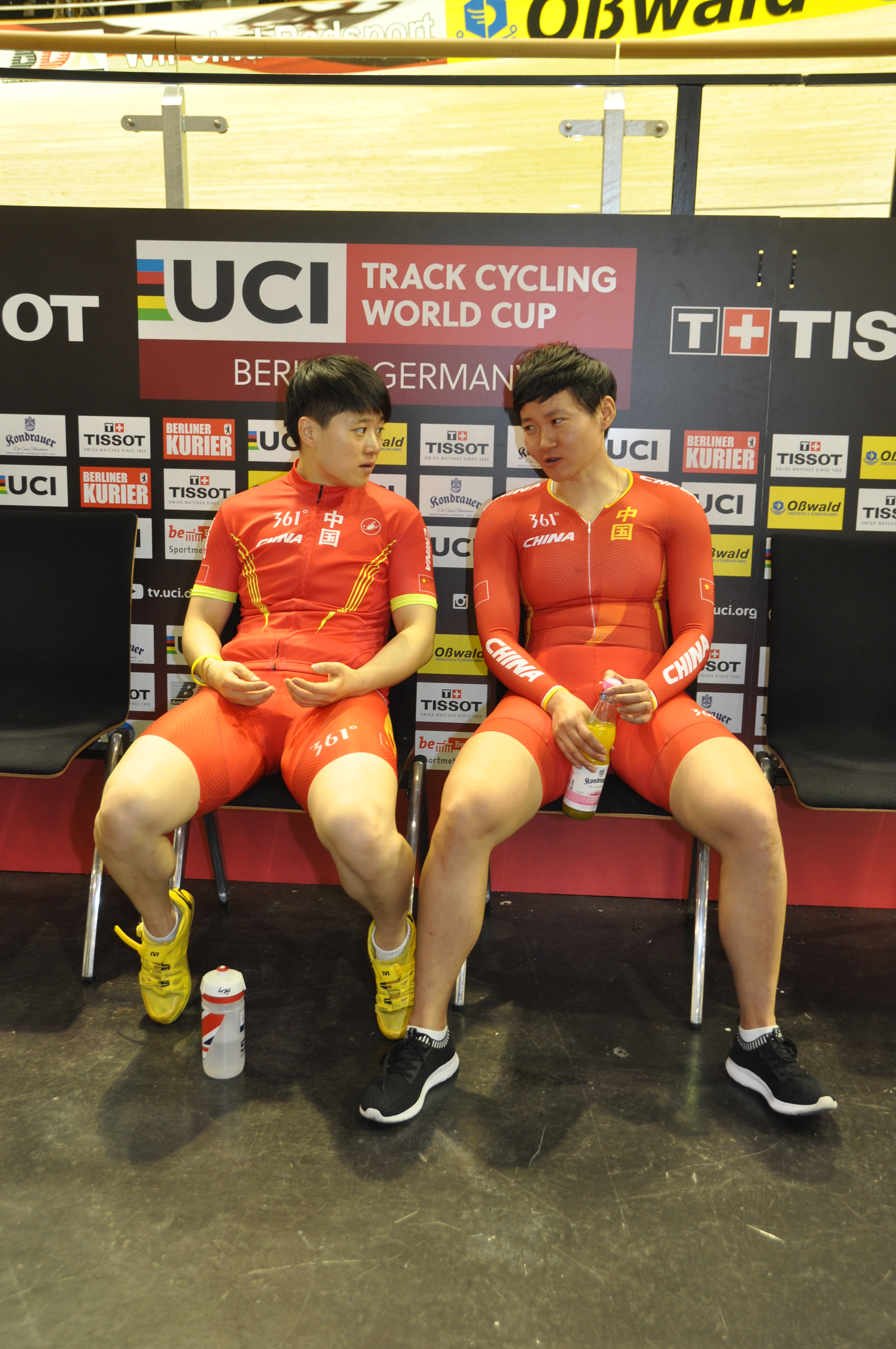
- Lin (left) in 2018

Personal information
- Born: 9 December 1990 (age 35) Heilongjiang, China

Cycling career
- Sport: Cycling
- Discipline: Track cycling
Medal record
Representing China
Women's track cycling
World Championships
Silver medal – second place	2010 Ballerup	Team sprint
Silver medal – second place	2014 Cali	Team sprint
Silver medal – second place	2016 London	Sprint
Bronze medal – third place	2014 Cali	Sprint
Asian Games
Gold medal – first place	2018 Jakarta-Palembang	Team sprint
Silver medal – second place	2010 Guangzhou	Sprint
Bronze medal – third place	2014 Incheon	Sprint
Asian Championships
Gold medal – first place	2010 Sharjah	Team sprint
Gold medal – first place	2011 Nakhon Ratchasima	Team sprint
Gold medal – first place	2014 Astana	Sprint
Gold medal – first place	2014 Astana	Team sprint
Gold medal – first place	2015 Nakhon Ratchasima	Keirin
Gold medal – first place	2016 Izu	Sprint
Gold medal – first place	2019 Jakarta	500 m time trial
Gold medal – first place	2019 Jakarta	Team sprint
Silver medal – second place	2011 Nakhon Ratchasima	Sprint
Silver medal – second place	2015 Nakhon Ratchasima	Sprint

Lin Junhong (Chinese: 林俊红; pinyin: Lín Jùnhóng, born 9 December 1990) is a Chinese track cyclist. She represented her nation at the 2010, 2011, 2012, 2014 and 2015 UCI Track Cycling World Championships.

In July 2026, Lin was issued with a four-year ban backdated to October 2025 for an anti-doping rule violation for testing positive for anabolic steroids. The decision came after retesting of samples taken in 2016.

== Major results ==
2014
Asian Track Championships

1st Sprint
1st Team Sprint (with Zhong Tianshi)

1st Keirin, Hong Kong International Track Cup
China Track Cup

1st Keirin
1st Sprint

3rd Sprint, Asian Games
3rd Keirin, Adelaide Cycling Grand Prix
3rd Sprint, Super Drome Cup
3rd Sprint, South Australian Track Classic
2015
Asian Track Championships

1st Keirin
2nd Sprint

2nd Sprint, Singen
China Track Cup

2nd Keirin
3rd Keirin
3rd Sprint

3rd Sprint, Dudenhofen
2016
1st Sprint, Asian Track Championships
2017
1st 500m Time Trial, National Track Championships
