= Riyu Ohta =

Japanese cyclist (born 1994)

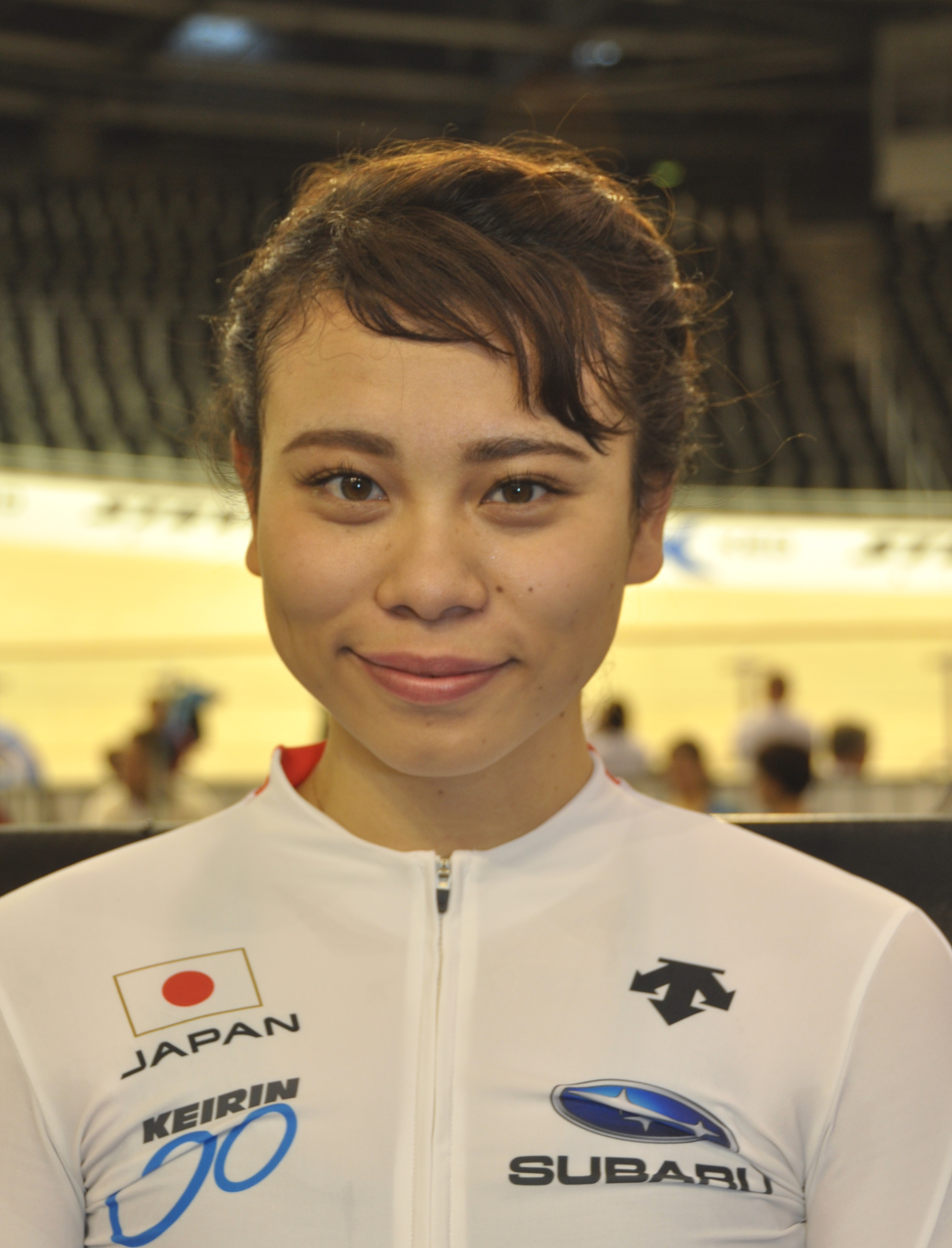
- Ohta in November 2018

Personal information
- Born: 17 August 1994 (age 32) Ageo, Japan
- Height: 1.65 m (5 ft 5 in)
- Weight: 65 kg (143 lb)

Cycling career
- Sport: Cycling
- Discipline: Track
- Role: Rider

Professional team
- 2018–: Team Bridgestone Cycling
Medal record
Representing Japan
Women's track cycling
Asian Games
Bronze medal – third place	2018 Jakarta-Palembang	Sprint
Bronze medal – third place	2022 Hangzhou	Pursuit
Asian Championships
Bronze medal – third place	2017 New Delhi	Team sprint
Bronze medal – third place	2018 Nilai	Team sprint
Gold medal – first place	2022 New Delhi	Sprint
Silver medal – second place	2022 New Delhi	Team sprint
Gold medal – first place	2023 Nilai	Sprint
Silver medal – second place	2023 Nilai	Team sprint
Bronze medal – third place	2023 Nilai	Keirin

Riyu Ohta (太田りゆ, Ōhta Riyu; born 17 August 1994) is a Japanese track cyclist representing Team Bridgestone Cycling at the professional level and the Japanese national cycling team. She is also active in Japan as a keirin cyclist.

== Biography ==
=== Junior years ===
Since childhood, Ohta was good at all kinds of sports, not just track and field. She attended the Ageo Municipal Uehira Junior High School and Inagakuen Public High School, both of which were strong schools in track and field. At school, she was a member of the track and field club and ran middle distance.

=== Senior years ===
She enrolled in the Tokyo Women's College of Physical Education with the intention of continuing athletics in college. Her parents got divorced shortly after she enrolled and had to give up athletics due to financial reasons. She then searched for jobs from which she could earn enough money to sustain her own financial efforts and found Girls Keirin. A friend of her whose father was a keirin racer told her that she was suited to be a keirin racer, and although she had no experience in cycling, when she participated in Girls Summer Camp in the summer of her third year of college, she decided that she wanted to become a racer. Shortly after, she applied for the entrance exam to the Keirin School, took the aptitude test, and passed.

She took a leave of absence from university and enrolled in the Keirin School as a member of the 112th class. She was classmates with fellow racers Fuko Umekawa, Miki Suzuki, Maori Terasaki, Megumi Kato, and Karin Okubo. While enrolled, she exceeded the highest standard (A standard) times in the 200m flying dash, 400m flying dash, 1000m time trial, and 2000m time trial at the second record meet held in September 2016, becoming the third female rider to win the Golden Cap after Yuka Kobayashi and Fuko Umekawa, and the second aptitude test-taker to do so after Kobayashi. During her time at the Keirin School, she became institutional champion 20 times, but her average score was second in the school's results. In the graduation commemorative race, she placed herself as first in the qualifying rounds and advanced to the finals, but finished on the 6th place.

While studying at the Keirin School, she was selected for the Japanese women's national cycling team where she was discovered by Benoit Bétou, who was the head coach of the team. In February 2017, before graduating from the Keirin School, she was selected as a member of the Asian Championships and competed in the team sprint by teaming up with Kayono Maeda, finishing on the third position.

She made her debut at Takamatsu Keirin Stadium on July 12, 2017, and her first victory was also in her debut race. She won three races in a row at her debut venue, Takamatsu FI, making her the fifth rider in Girls Keirin to win a perfect victory at her debut venue.

Since then, she has focused on cycling, mainly in overseas races, and has only raced 60 times in Girls Keirin in the three years from her debut to the first half of 2020, with a total of 8 wins, 29 first-place finishes, 9 second-place finishes, and 7 third-place finishes. However, the reason for the small number of races she has run is due to her official duties, and she has been selected for the Girls Keirin Special Races under the exceptional rules, and has competed in the Girls Keirin Collection four times since her first race at the Hiratsuka Stage in May 2018.

In competitive cycling, she and Yuka Kobayashi were designated by the JCF as "women's elite training designated athlete "A" designated athletes", and won a silver medal in the keirin at the World Cup in January 2019. However, at the World Championships in Berlin in March 2020, where a spot in the Tokyo Olympics was at stake (there are no host country in Olympic track cycling events), she and Yuka Kobayashi were eliminated in the repechage in the women's keirin, missing out on a spot. However, due to the cumulative Olympic points she had earned in the World Cup up to that point, she had secured one spot in the women's keirin, and Yuka Kobayashi was selected to represent Japan at the 2020 Tokyo Olympics. Her strength is impressive: She has muscular thighs with a circumference of 65 cm and squats 110 kg for 10 repetitions.
