= Fatehah Mustapa =

Malaysian cyclist (born 1989)

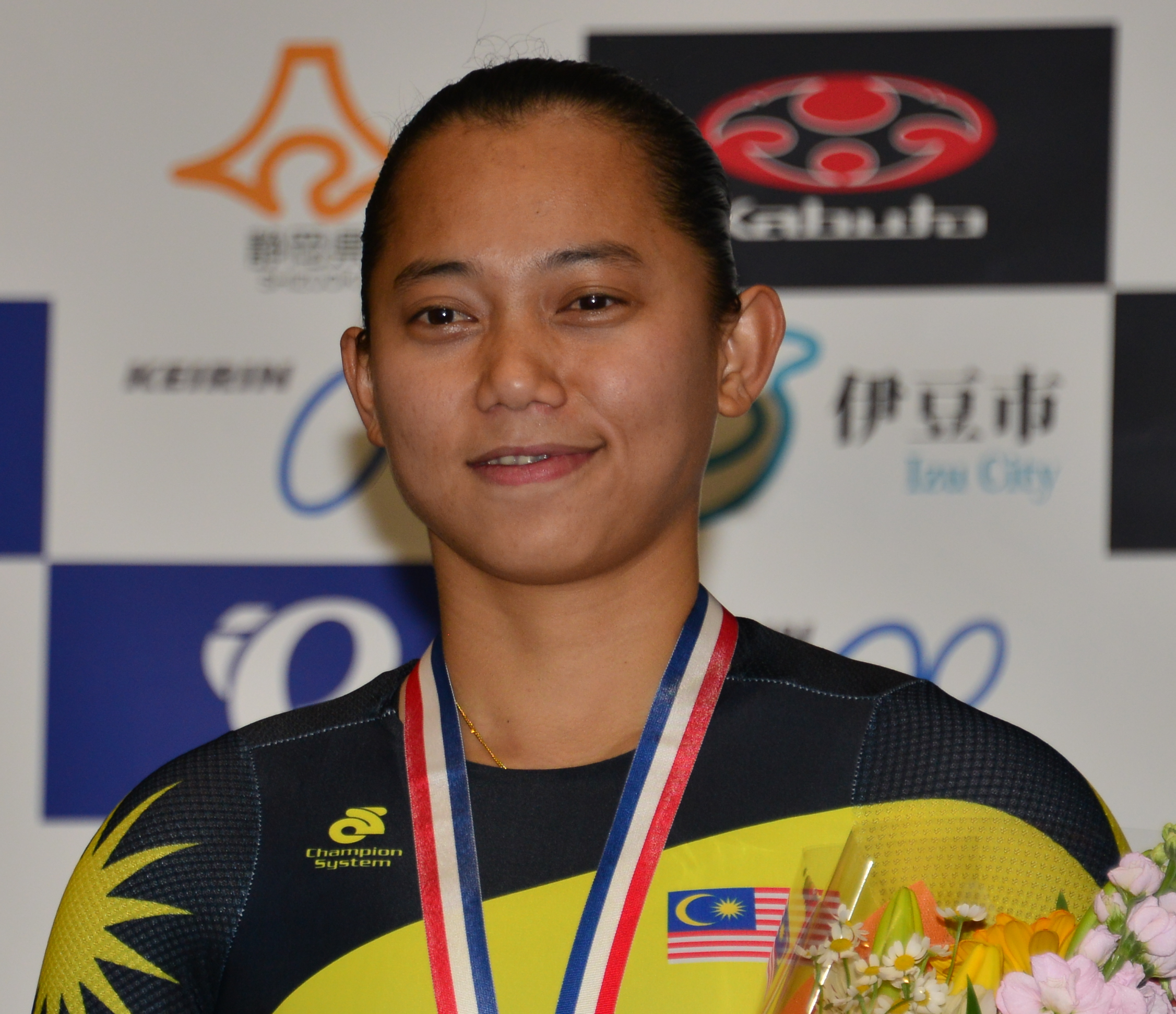
- Mustapa in 2016

Personal information
- Born: 12 March 1989 (age 37) Kuala Berang, Terengganu
- Height: 163 cm (5 ft 4 in)

Cycling career
- Sport: Cycling
- Discipline: Track
- Role: Rider
- Rider type: Sprinter
Medal record
Representing Malaysia
Women's track cycling
Asian Games
Silver medal – second place	2014 Incheon	Keirin
Asian Championships
Gold medal – first place	2013 New Delhi	Sprint
Gold medal – first place	2012 Kuala Lumpur	Keirin
Silver medal – second place	2016 Izu	Keirin
Silver medal – second place	2015 Nakhon Ratchasima	500 m time trial
Silver medal – second place	2013 New Delhi	Keirin
Silver medal – second place	2012 Kuala Lumpur	Sprint
Silver medal – second place	2008 Nara	500 m time trial
Silver medal – second place	2008 Nara	Keirin
Bronze medal – third place	2020 Jincheon	500m time trial
Bronze medal – third place	2015 Nakhon Ratchasima	Sprint
Bronze medal – third place	2014 Astana	500 m time trial
Bronze medal – third place	2013 New Delhi	500 m time trial
Bronze medal – third place	2012 Kuala Lumpur	500 m time trial
Bronze medal – third place	2011 Nakhon Ratchasima	500 m time trial
Bronze medal – third place	2009 Tenggarong	Sprint
Bronze medal – third place	2009 Tenggarong	500 m time trial
Southeast Asian Games
Gold medal – first place	2011 Jakarta / Palembang	Sprint
Gold medal – first place	2011 Jakarta / Palembang	Team sprint
Gold medal – first place	2011 Jakarta / Palembang	500 m time trial
Bronze medal – third place	2007 Nakhon Ratchasima	Sprint
Bronze medal – third place	2007 Nakhon Ratchasima	Team sprint
Bronze medal – third place	2007 Nakhon Ratchasima	500 m time trial

Fatehah Mustapa (born 12 March 1989) is a retired Malaysian track cyclist.

She competed in the keirin race at the 2012 Summer Olympics, where she placed 15th.

At the 2014 Commonwealth Games, she reached the bronze medal race in the women's sprint which she lost 2–0 to Jess Varnish. She also finished 5th in the women's 500 m time trial.

At the 2016 Olympics, she competed in the women's sprint. She finished at 21st place in qualification round.

== Major results ==
2007
3rd 500m Time Trial SEA Games
3rd Women Sprint SEA Games
2011
1st 500m Time Trial SEA Games
2012
1st Keirin Asian Cycling Championships
2nd Sprint Asian Cycling Championships
3rd Time Trial 500m Asian Cycling Championships
3rd Sprint Grand Prix von Deutschland
3rd Keirin Grand Prix von Deutschland
2013
1st Sprint Asian Cycling Championships
1st Keirin Asian Cycling Championships
3rd Time Trial 500m Asian Cycling Championships
1st Sprint Southeast Asian Grand Prix
1st Time Trial 500m Southeast Asian Grand Prix
3rd Keirin, Melbourne Cup on Wheels
2014
1st Sprint, South East Asian GP Track (2)
South East Asian GP Track (3)

1st Keirin
2nd Sprint

2nd Keirin 3rd round 2013-2014 UCI Track Cycling World Cup
2nd Keirin, Asian Games
South East Asian GP Track (1)

2nd Keirin
2nd Sprint

2nd Keirin, Cottbuser Nächte
3rd 500m Time Trial, Asian Track Championships
3rd Keirin, Austral
2015
Japan Track Cup

1st Keirin
1st Sprint
1st Sprint

South East Asian GP Track

1st Keirin
1st Keirin
1st Sprint
1st Sprint

Asian Track Championships

2nd 500m Time Trial
3rd Sprint

2017
3rd Keirin, ITS Melbourne - Hisense Grand Prix
Austral

3rd Keirin
3rd Sprint

== See also ==
- List of Malaysian records in track cycling
