= Lee Hye-jin =

South Korean cyclist

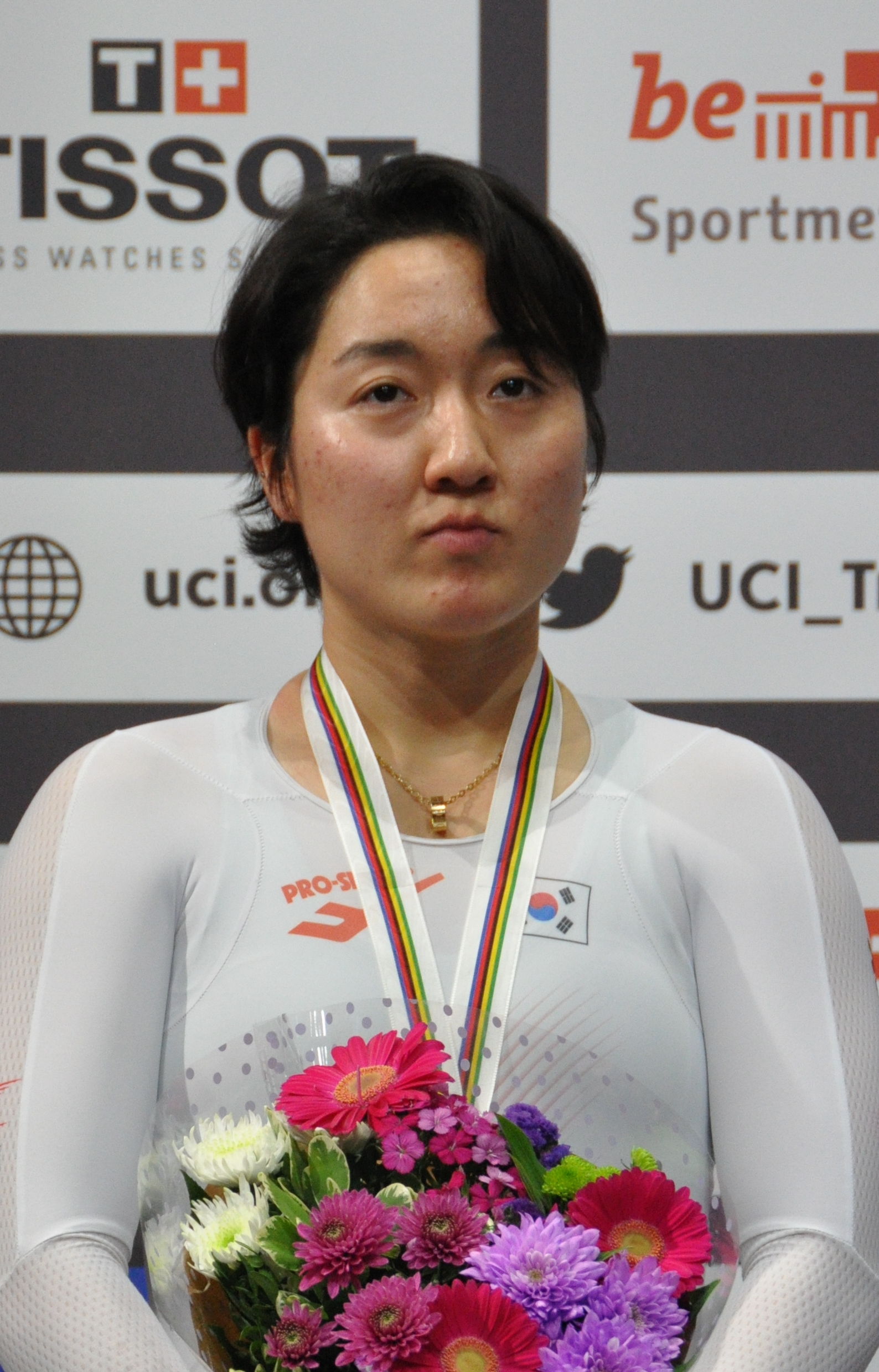
- Lee Hye-jin (2020)

Personal information
- Born: 23 January 1992 (age 34) Gyeonggi, South Korea
- Height: 1.65 m (5 ft 5 in)
- Weight: 61 kg (134 lb)

Cycling career
- Sport: Cycling
- Discipline: Track
- Role: Rider
Medal record
World Championships
Silver medal – second place	2020 Berlin	Keirin
Asian Games
Silver medal – second place	2014 Incheon	Team sprint
Silver medal – second place	2018 Jakarta-Palembang	Sprint
Silver medal – second place	2018 Jakarta-Palembang	Keirin
Silver medal – second place	2022 Hangzhou	Team sprint
Bronze medal – third place	2018 Jakarta-Palembang	Team sprint
Asian Championships
Silver medal – second place	2019 Jakarta	Team sprint
Silver medal – second place	2020 Jincheon	Team sprint
Bronze medal – third place	2019 Jakarta	Sprint
Bronze medal – third place	2020 Jincheon	Keirin
Bronze medal – third place	2023 Nilai	Team sprint

Lee Hye-jin (Korean pronunciation: [i.ɦje̞.dʑin] or [i] [hje̞.dʑin], born ) is a South Korean track cyclist.

At the 2012 Summer Olympics, she competed in the women's sprint, women's keirin, and women's team sprint. She finished at the 2016 Summer Olympics in keirin event.

== Career ==
Lee won the silver medal in the women's keirin at the 2018 Asian Games.

At the 2020 Summer Olympics, she again competed in the women's keirin and women's sprint. She won a silver medal in the women's keirin at the 2020 World Championships, the best result ever for a Korean cyclist. With this result, she became the world number 1 in women's keirin.

Alongside Hwang Hyeon-seo, Kim Ha-eun, Cho Sun-yong, Lee was part of the women's sprint team that won the silver medal at the 2022 Asian Games.

== Major results ==
2014
Asian Track Championships

2nd 500m Time Trial
2nd Team Sprint (with Kim Won-gyeong)

2nd Team Sprint, Asian Games (with Kim Won-gyeong)
2nd Sprint, Japan Track Cup 1
3rd Keirin, Japan Track Cup 2
Incheon International Track Competition

3rd Keirin
3rd Sprint

2015
Asian Track Championships

1st Team Sprint (with Choi Seulgi)
2nd Keirin

2016
2nd Team Sprint, Asian Track Championships (with Cho Sun-young)
2017
1st Team Sprint, Asian Track Championships (with Kim Won-gyeong)
