= Kayono Maeda =

Japanese cyclist

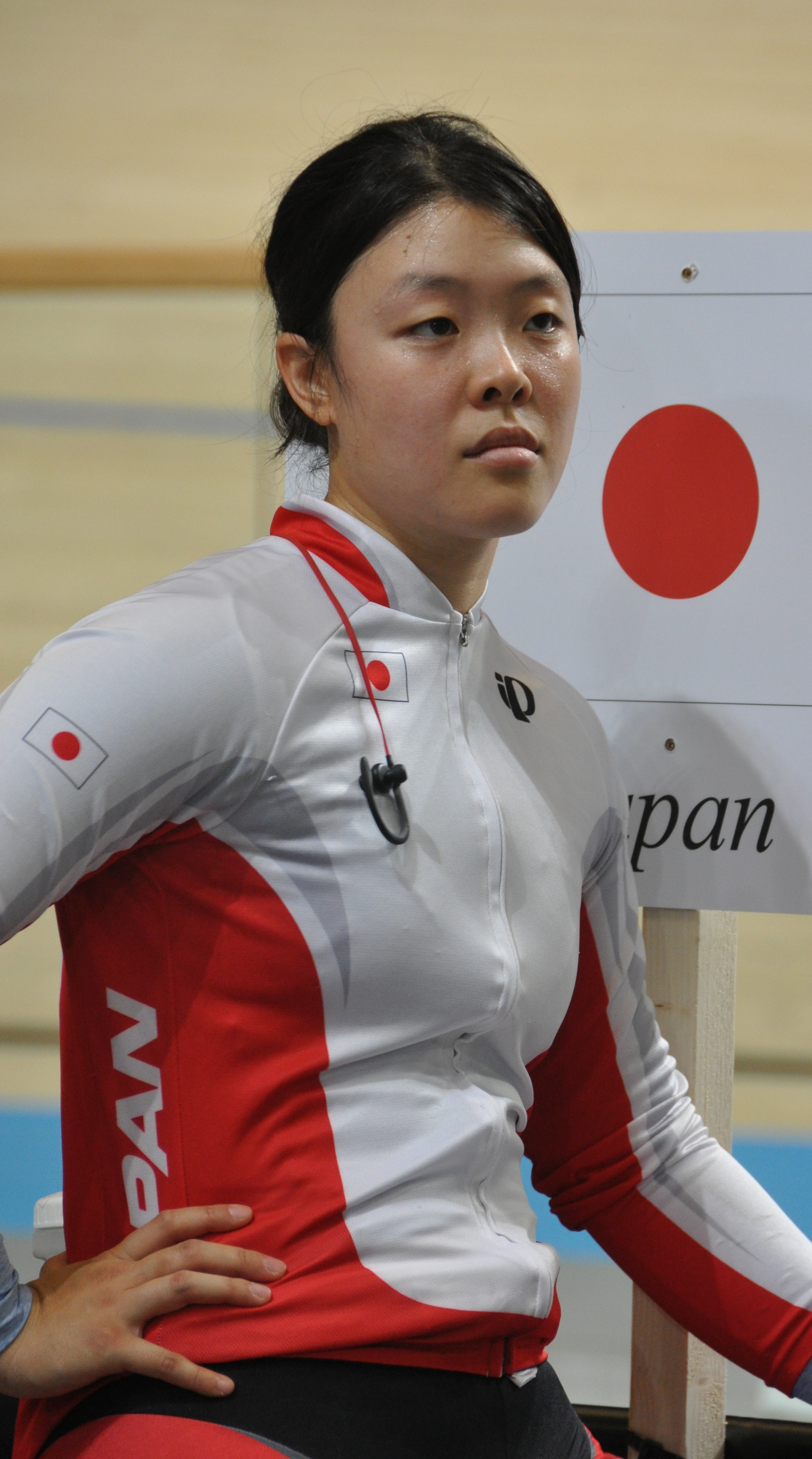
- Kayono Maeda (2016)

Personal information
- Born: 13 January 1991 (age 35)

Cycling career
- Sport: Cycling
- Discipline: Track cycling
- Role: Rider
- Rider type: sprint

Kayono Maeda (前田佳代乃, Maeda Kayono; born 13 January 1991) is a Japanese track cyclist, born in Kikuchi.

== Career ==
From 2009 to 2018, she won an unprecedented 10 consecutive gold medals in professional sprint cycling events at the Japanese National Track Race Championships.

At the 2012 Summer Olympics, she competed in the Women's sprint. She also competed in the sprint event at the 2012, 2013, 2014 and 2015 UCI Track Cycling World Championships.

On 9 September 2018, Maeda announced her retirement from cycling.

== Career results ==
2013
ACC Track Asia Cup – Thailand Round

1st Sprint
1st 500m Time Trial

2014
Track Clubs ACC Cup

1st Keirin
1st Sprint
1st 500m Time Trial

2nd Sprint, Japan Track Cup 2
3rd Team Sprint, Asian Track Championships (with Takako Ishii)
3rd Sprint, Japan Track Cup 2
2015
Track Clubs ACC Cup

1st 500m Time Trial
2nd Sprint
3rd Keirin

Asian Track Championships

2nd Team Sprint (with Takako Ishii)
3rd 500m Time Trial

2016
Taiwan Hsin-Chu Track International Classic

1st Sprint
3rd Keirin
3rd Team Sprint (with Takako Ishii)

3rd Keirin, Japan Track Cup
3rd Team Sprint, Asian Track Championships (with Takako Ishii)
2017
Japanese National Track Championships

1st Sprint
2nd Keirin

Asian Track Championships

3rd Keirin
3rd Team Sprint (with Riyu Ohta)
