= 2025 XDS Astana Team season =

XDS Astana Team
- 2025 season
- UCI code: AST
- Status: UCI WorldTeam
- Manager: Alexander Vinokourov (KAZ)
- Based: Kazakhstan

Season victories
- One-day races: 3
- Stage race overall: 5
- Stage race stages: 11
- National Championships: 2
- Most wins: (Ecuador) Harold Martín López (Italy) Christian Scaroni (4 wins each)

The 2025 season for the XDS Astana Team team is the team's 20th season in existence, all of which have been as a UCI WorldTeam.

== Team roster ==
All ages are as of 1 January 2025, the first day of the 2025 season.

As of 8 January 2025.

Rider	Date of birth
Davide Ballerini (ITA)	21 September 1994 (aged 30)
Alberto Bettiol (ITA)	29 October 1993 (aged 31)
Cees Bol (NED)	27 July 1995 (aged 29)
Clément Champoussin (FRA)	29 May 1998 (aged 26)
Anthon Charmig (DEN)	25 March 1998 (aged 26)
Nicola Conci (ITA)	5 January 1997 (aged 27)
Yevgeniy Fedorov (KAZ)	16 February 2000 (aged 24)
Lorenzo Fortunato (ITA)	9 May 1996 (aged 28)
Aaron Gate (NZL)	26 November 1990 (aged 34)
Michele Gazzoli (ITA)	4 March 1999 (aged 25)
Sergio Higuita (COL)	1 August 1997 (aged 27)
Florian Samuel Kajamini (ITA)	28 February 2003 (aged 21)
Max Kanter (GER)	22 October 1997 (aged 27)
Anton Kuzmin (KAZ)	20 November 1996 (aged 28)
Harold Martín López (ECU)	3 December 2000 (age 25)

Rider	Date of birth
Matteo Malucelli (ITA)	20 October 1993 (aged 31)
Fausto Masnada (ITA)	6 November 1993 (aged 31)
Henok Mulubrhan (ERI)	11 November 1999 (aged 25)
Wout Poels (NED)	1 October 1987 (aged 37)
Alessandro Romele (ITA)	30 August 2003 (aged 21)
Christian Scaroni (ITA)	16 October 1997 (aged 27)
Ide Schelling (NED)	6 February 1998 (aged 26)
Su Haoyu (CHN)	26 October 2000 (aged 24)
Harold Tejada (COL)	27 April 1997 (aged 27)
Mike Teunissen (NED)	25 August 1992 (aged 32)
Davide Toneatti (ITA)	9 April 2001 (aged 23)
Diego Ulissi (ITA)	15 July 1989 (aged 35)
Darren van Bekkum (NED)	20 March 2002 (aged 22)
Simone Velasco (ITA)	2 December 1995 (aged 29)
Nicolas Vinokurov (KAZ)	7 July 2002 (age 23)

== Season victories ==
Date	Race	Competition	Rider	Country	Location	Ref.
21 February	Classic Var	UCI Europe Tour	Christian Scaroni (ITA)	France	Fayence	
22 February	Tour des Alpes-Maritimes, stage 1	UCI Europe Tour	Christian Scaroni (ITA)	France	Gourdon	
23 February	Tour des Alpes-Maritimes, overall	UCI Europe Tour	Christian Scaroni (ITA)	France		
6 April	Tour of Greece, overall	UCI Europe Tour	Harold Martín López (ECU)	Greece		
7 April	Tour of Hainan, stage 1	UCI ProSeries	Matteo Malucelli (ITA)	China	Qionghai	
10 April	Tour of Hainan, stage 4	UCI ProSeries	Aaron Gate (NZL)	China	Dongfang	
29 April	Presidential Tour of Turkey, stage 3	UCI ProSeries	Lev Gonov (RUS)	Turkey	Marmaris	
30 April	Presidential Tour of Turkey, stage 4	UCI ProSeries	Wout Poels (NED)	Turkey	Akyaka	
1 May	Tour de Romandie, stage 2	UCI World Tour	Lorenzo Fortunato (ITA)	Switzerland	La Grande Béroche	
2 May	Presidential Tour of Turkey, stage 6	UCI ProSeries	Harold Martín López (ECU)	Turkey	Selçuk	
4 May	Presidential Tour of Turkey, stage 8	UCI ProSeries	Matteo Malucelli (ITA)	Turkey	İzmir	
4 May	Presidential Tour of Turkey, overall	UCI ProSeries	Wout Poels (NED)	Turkey		
4 May	Famenne Ardenne Classic	UCI Europe Tour	Max Kanter (GER)	Belgium	Marche-en-Famenne	
16 May	Tour de Hongrie, stage 3	UCI ProSeries	Harold Martín López (ECU)	Hungary	Gyöngyös-Kékestető	
18 May	Tour de Hongrie, overall	UCI ProSeries	Harold Martín López (ECU)	Hungary		
27 May	Giro d'Italia, stage 16	UCI World Tour	Christian Scaroni (ITA)	Italy	San Valentino	
31 May	Boucles de la Mayenne, stage 2	UCI ProSeries	Aaron Gate (NZL)	France	Bais	
1 June	Boucles de la Mayenne, overall	UCI ProSeries	Aaron Gate (NZL)	France		
24 June	Giro dell'Appennino	UCI Europe Tour	Diego Ulissi (ITA)	Italy	Genoa	

== National, Continental, and World Champions ==
Date	Discipline	Jersey	Rider	Country	Location	Ref.
11 February	Asian Continental Time Trial Championships		Yevgeniy Fedorov (KAZ)	Thailand	Bueng Si Fai	
26 June	Kazakhstan National Time Trial Championships		Yevgeniy Fedorov (KAZ)	Kazakhstan		
29 June	Kazakhstan National Road Race Championships		Yevgeniy Fedorov (KAZ)	Kazakhstan		
