= List of rosters for Astana Pro Team and its successors =

The List of Astana Team riders contains riders from XDS Astana Team. For the 2006 team known as Astana see List of Liberty Seguros riders.

== 2007 (Astana Pro Team) ==
Rider	Date of birth
Igor Abakoumov (BEL)	May 30, 1981 (aged 25)
Assan Bazayev (KAZ)	February 22, 1981 (aged 25)
Antonio Colóm (ESP)	May 11, 1978 (aged 28)
Koen de Kort (NED)	September 8, 1982 (aged 24)
Thomas Frei (SUI)	January 19, 1984 (aged 22)
Maxim Gourov (KAZ)	January 30, 1979 (aged 28)
René Haselbacher (AUT)	September 15, 1977 (aged 29)
Maxim Iglinskiy (KAZ)	April 18, 1981 (aged 25)
Sergei Ivanov (RUS)	March 5, 1975 (aged 31)
Benoît Joachim (LUX)	January 4, 1976 (aged 30)
Andrey Kashechkin (KAZ)	March 21, 1980 (aged 26)
Matthias Kessler (GER)	May 16, 1979 (aged 27)
Andreas Klöden (GER)	June 22, 1975 (aged 31)
Alexey Kolessov (KAZ)	September 22, 1984 (aged 22)

Rider	Date of birth
Julien Mazet (FRA)	March 19, 1981 (aged 25)
Eddy Mazzoleni (ITA)	July 29, 1973 (aged 33)
Gennady Mikhaylov (RUS)	February 8, 1974 (aged 32)
Andrey Mizurov (KAZ)	March 16, 1973 (aged 33)
Steve Morabito (SUI)	January 30, 1983 (aged 23)
Dmitriy Muravyev (KAZ)	February 11, 1979 (aged 27)
Daniel Navarro (ESP)	July 8, 1983 (aged 23)
Grégory Rast (SUI)	January 17, 1980 (aged 26)
José Antonio Redondo (ESP)	March 5, 1985 (aged 21)
Paolo Savoldelli (ITA)	May 7, 1973 (aged 33)
Michael Schär (SUI)	September 29, 1986 (aged 20)
Evgeniy Sladkov (KAZ)	December 15, 1983 (aged 23)
Alexander Vinokourov (KAZ)	September 16, 1973 (aged 33)
Sergei Yakovlev (KAZ)	April 21, 1976 (aged 30)

== 2008 (Astana Pro Team) ==
Rider	Date of birth
Assan Bazayev (KAZ)	February 22, 1981 (aged 26)
Janez Brajkovič (SLO)	December 18, 1983 (aged 24)
Antonio Colóm (ESP)	May 11, 1978 (aged 29)
Alberto Contador (ESP)	December 6, 1982 (aged 25)
Koen de Kort (NED)	September 8, 1982 (aged 25)
Thomas Frei (SUI)	January 19, 1984 (aged 23)
Vladimir Gusev (RUS)	July 4, 1981 (aged 26)
René Haselbacher (AUT)	September 15, 1977 (aged 30)
Chris Horner (USA)	October 23, 1971 (aged 36)
Maxim Iglinskiy (KAZ)	April 18, 1981 (aged 26)
Sergei Ivanov (RUS)	March 5, 1975 (aged 32)
Benoît Joachim (LUX)	January 4, 1976 (aged 31)
Aaron Kemps (AUS)	September 10, 1983 (aged 24)
Roman Kireyev (KAZ)	February 14, 1987 (aged 20)
Andreas Klöden (GER)	June 22, 1975 (aged 32)

Rider	Date of birth
Berik Kupeshov (KAZ)	January 30, 1987 (aged 20)
Levi Leipheimer (USA)	October 24, 1973 (aged 34)
Julien Mazet (FRA)	March 19, 1981 (aged 26)
Andrey Mizurov (KAZ)	March 16, 1973 (aged 34)
Steve Morabito (SUI)	January 30, 1983 (aged 24)
Dmitriy Muravyev (KAZ)	February 11, 1979 (aged 28)
Daniel Navarro (ESP)	July 8, 1983 (aged 24)
Benjamín Noval (ESP)	January 23, 1979 (aged 28)
Sérgio Paulinho (POR)	March 26, 1980 (aged 27)
Grégory Rast (SUI)	January 17, 1980 (aged 27)
José Luis Rubiera (ESP)	January 27, 1973 (aged 34)
Michael Schär (SUI)	September 29, 1986 (aged 21)
Tomas Vaitkus (LTU)	February 4, 1982 (aged 25)
Sergei Yakovlev (KAZ)	April 21, 1976 (aged 31)
Andrey Zeits (KAZ)	December 14, 1986 (aged 21)

== 2009 (Astana Pro Team) ==
Rider	Date of birth
Lance Armstrong (USA)	September 18, 1971 (aged 37)
Assan Bazayev (KAZ)	February 22, 1981 (aged 27)
Janez Brajkovič (SLO)	December 18, 1983 (aged 25)
Alberto Contador (ESP)	December 6, 1982 (aged 26)
Valeriy Dmitriyev (KAZ)	October 10, 1984 (aged 24)
Alexsandr Dyachenko (KAZ)	October 17, 1983 (aged 25)
Jesús Hernández (ESP)	September 28, 1981 (aged 27)
Chris Horner (USA)	October 23, 1971 (aged 37)
Maxim Iglinskiy (KAZ)	April 18, 1981 (aged 27)
Roman Kireyev (KAZ)	February 14, 1987 (aged 21)
Andreas Klöden (GER)	June 22, 1975 (aged 33)
Berik Kupeshov (KAZ)	January 30, 1987 (aged 21)
Levi Leipheimer (USA)	October 24, 1973 (aged 35)
Steve Morabito (SUI)	January 30, 1983 (aged 25)

Rider	Date of birth
Dmitriy Muravyev (KAZ)	February 11, 1979 (aged 29)
Daniel Navarro (ESP)	July 8, 1983 (aged 25)
Benjamín Noval (ESP)	January 23, 1979 (aged 29)
Sérgio Paulinho (POR)	March 26, 1980 (aged 28)
Yaroslav Popovych (UKR)	January 4, 1980 (aged 28)
Bolat Raimbekov (KAZ)	December 25, 1986 (aged 22)
Grégory Rast (SUI)	January 17, 1980 (aged 28)
Sergey Renev (KAZ)	January 3, 1985 (aged 23)
José Luis Rubiera (ESP)	January 27, 1973 (aged 35)
Michael Schär (SUI)	September 29, 1986 (aged 22)
Tomas Vaitkus (LTU)	February 4, 1982 (aged 26)
Alexander Vinokourov (Note: Vinokourov joined the team on August 29, at the beginning of the Vuelta a España) (KAZ)	September 16, 1973 (aged 35)
Andrey Zeits (KAZ)	December 14, 1986 (aged 22)
Haimar Zubeldia (ESP)	April 1, 1977 (aged 31)

== 2010 (Astana Pro Team) ==
Rider	Date of birth
Assan Bazayev (KAZ)	February 22, 1981 (aged 28)
Alberto Contador (ESP)	December 6, 1982 (aged 27)
Allan Davis (AUS)	July 27, 1980 (aged 29)
Scott Davis (AUS)	April 22, 1979 (aged 30)
David de la Fuente (ESP)	May 4, 1981 (aged 28)
Valeriy Dmitriyev (KAZ)	October 10, 1984 (aged 25)
Alexsandr Dyachenko (KAZ)	October 17, 1983 (aged 26)
Dmitry Fofonov (KAZ)	August 15, 1976 (aged 33)
Enrico Gasparotto (ITA)	March 22, 1982 (aged 27)
Maxim Gourov (KAZ)	January 30, 1979 (aged 30)
Jesús Hernández (ESP)	September 28, 1981 (aged 28)
Andriy Hryvko (UKR)	August 7, 1983 (aged 26)
Maxim Iglinskiy (KAZ)	April 18, 1981 (aged 28)
Valentin Iglinskiy (KAZ)	May 12, 1984 (aged 25)

Rider	Date of birth
Josep Jufré (ESP)	August 5, 1975 (aged 34)
Roman Kireyev (KAZ)	February 14, 1987 (aged 22)
Daniel Navarro (ESP)	July 8, 1983 (aged 26)
Yevgeniy Nepomnyachshiy (KAZ)	March 12, 1987 (aged 22)
Benjamín Noval (ESP)	January 23, 1979 (aged 30)
Óscar Pereiro (ESP)	August 3, 1977 (aged 32)
Bolat Raimbekov (KAZ)	December 25, 1986 (aged 23)
Sergey Renev (KAZ)	January 3, 1985 (aged 24)
Mirko Selvaggi (ITA)	February 11, 1985 (aged 24)
Gorazd Štangelj (SLO)	January 27, 1973 (aged 36)
Paolo Tiralongo (ITA)	July 8, 1977 (aged 32)
Alexander Vinokourov (KAZ)	September 16, 1973 (aged 36)
Andrey Zeits (KAZ)	December 14, 1986 (aged 23)

== 2011 (Astana Pro Team) ==
Rider	Date of birth
Assan Bazayev (KAZ)	February 22, 1981 (aged 29)
Simon Clarke (AUS)	July 18, 1986 (aged 24)
Allan Davis (AUS)	July 27, 1980 (aged 30)
Rémy Di Gregorio (FRA)	July 31, 1985 (aged 25)
Alexsandr Dyachenko (KAZ)	October 17, 1983 (aged 27)
Dmitry Fofonov (KAZ)	August 15, 1976 (aged 34)
Enrico Gasparotto (ITA)	March 22, 1982 (aged 28)
Maxim Gourov (KAZ)	January 30, 1979 (aged 31)
Dmitriy Gruzdev (Note: Rider joined the team on August 1 as a stagiaire.) (KAZ)	March 13, 1986 (aged 24)
Andriy Hryvko (UKR)	August 7, 1983 (aged 27)
Maxim Iglinsky (KAZ)	April 18, 1981 (aged 29)
Valentin Iglinsky (KAZ)	May 12, 1984 (aged 26)
Josep Jufré (ESP)	August 5, 1975 (aged 35)
Nazar Jumabekov (KAZ)	January 3, 1987 (aged 23)
Tanel Kangert (EST)	March 11, 1987 (aged 23)
Andrey Kashechkin (Note: Kashechkin joined the team on August 5.) (KAZ)	March 21, 1980 (aged 30)
Fredrik Kessiakoff (SWE)	May 17, 1980 (aged 30)

Rider	Date of birth
Roman Kireyev (Note: Kireyev retired from the sport on August 22.) (KAZ)	February 14, 1987 (aged 23)
Robert Kišerlovski (CRO)	August 9, 1986 (aged 24)
Roman Kreuziger (CZE)	May 6, 1986 (aged 24)
Mirco Lorenzetto (ITA)	July 13, 1981 (aged 29)
Francesco Masciarelli (ITA)	May 5, 1986 (aged 24)
Andrey Mizurov (Note: Mizurov joined the team on May 14) (KAZ)	March 16, 1973 (aged 37)
Yevgeniy Nepomnyachshiy (KAZ)	March 12, 1987 (aged 23)
Evgeni Petrov (RUS)	May 25, 1978 (aged 32)
Sergey Renev (KAZ)	January 3, 1985 (aged 25)
Alexandre Shushemoin (KAZ)	February 26, 1987 (aged 23)
Gorazd Štangelj (SLO)	January 27, 1973 (aged 37)
Paolo Tiralongo (ITA)	July 8, 1977 (aged 33)
Ruslan Tleubayev (KAZ)	March 7, 1987 (aged 23)
Tomas Vaitkus (LTU)	February 4, 1982 (aged 28)
Alexander Vinokourov (Note: Vinokourov retired from the sport on July 17, but returned to the team on September 21.) (KAZ)	September 16, 1973 (aged 37)
Andrey Zeits (KAZ)	December 14, 1986 (aged 24)

== 2012 (Astana Pro Team) ==
Rider	Date of birth
Fabio Aru (Note: Aru joined the team on 1 August, as a stagiaire, from Palazzago-Elledent-RAD Logistica.) (ITA)	3 July 1990 (aged 21)
Assan Bazayev (KAZ)	22 February 1981 (aged 30)
Borut Božič (SLO)	8 August 1980 (aged 31)
Janez Brajkovič (SLO)	18 December 1983 (aged 28)
Alexsandr Dyachenko (KAZ)	17 October 1983 (aged 28)
Dmitry Fofonov (KAZ)	15 August 1976 (aged 35)
Enrico Gasparotto (ITA)	22 March 1982 (aged 29)
Francesco Gavazzi (ITA)	1 August 1984 (aged 27)
Dmitriy Gruzdev (KAZ)	13 March 1986 (aged 25)
Jacopo Guarnieri (ITA)	14 August 1987 (aged 24)
Andriy Hryvko (UKR)	7 August 1983 (aged 28)
Maxim Iglinskiy (KAZ)	18 April 1981 (aged 30)
Valentin Iglinskiy (KAZ)	12 May 1984 (aged 27)
Tanel Kangert (EST)	11 March 1987 (aged 24)

Rider	Date of birth
Andrey Kashechkin (KAZ)	21 March 1980 (aged 31)
Fredrik Kessiakoff (SWE)	17 May 1980 (aged 31)
Robert Kišerlovski (CRO)	9 August 1986 (aged 25)
Roman Kreuziger (CZE)	6 May 1986 (aged 25)
Francesco Masciarelli (Note: Masciarelli left the team on 6 June.) (ITA)	5 May 1986 (aged 25)
Dimitry Muravyev (KAZ)	2 November 1979 (aged 32)
Yevgeniy Nepomnyachshiy (KAZ)	12 March 1987 (aged 24)
Evgeni Petrov (RUS)	25 May 1978 (aged 33)
Simone Ponzi (ITA)	17 January 1987 (aged 24)
Sergey Renev (KAZ)	3 January 1985 (aged 26)
Kevin Seeldraeyers (BEL)	12 September 1986 (aged 25)
Egor Silin (RUS)	25 June 1988 (aged 23)
Paolo Tiralongo (ITA)	8 July 1977 (aged 34)
Alexander Vinokourov (KAZ)	16 September 1973 (aged 38)
Andrey Zeits (KAZ)	14 December 1986 (aged 25)

== 2013 (Astana Pro Team) ==
Rider	Date of birth
Valerio Agnoli (ITA)	6 January 1985 (age 41)
Fabio Aru (ITA)	3 July 1990 (age 35)
Assan Bazayev (KAZ)	22 February 1981 (age 45)
Borut Božič (SLO)	8 August 1980 (age 45)
Janez Brajkovič (SLO)	18 December 1983 (age 42)
Alexsandr Dyachenko (KAZ)	17 October 1983 (age 42)
Jakob Fuglsang (DEN)	22 March 1985 (age 41)
Enrico Gasparotto (ITA)	22 March 1982 (age 44)
Francesco Gavazzi (ITA)	1 August 1984 (age 41)
Dmitriy Gruzdev (KAZ)	13 March 1986 (age 40)
Andrea Guardini (ITA)	12 June 1989 (age 36)
Jacopo Guarnieri (ITA)	14 August 1987 (age 38)
Andriy Hrivko (UKR)	7 August 1983 (age 42)
Evan Huffman (USA)	7 January 1990 (age 36)
Maxim Iglinsky (KAZ)	18 April 1981 (age 45)

Rider	Date of birth
Arman Kamyshev (KAZ)	14 March 1991 (age 35)
Tanel Kangert (EST)	11 March 1987 (age 39)
Andrey Kashechkin (KAZ)	21 March 1980 (age 46)
Fredrik Kessiakoff (SWE)	17 May 1980 (age 46)
Alexey Lutsenko (KAZ)	7 September 1992 (age 33)
Dimitry Muravyev (KAZ)	2 November 1979 (age 46)
Vincenzo Nibali (ITA)	14 November 1984 (age 41)
Simone Ponzi (ITA)	17 January 1987 (age 39)
Kevin Seeldraeyers (BEL)	12 September 1986 (age 39)
Egor Silin (RUS)	25 June 1988 (age 37)
Paolo Tiralongo (ITA)	8 July 1977 (age 48)
Ruslan Tleubayev (KAZ)	7 March 1987 (age 39)
Alessandro Vanotti (ITA)	16 September 1980 (age 45)
Andrey Zeits (KAZ)	14 December 1986 (age 39)

== 2014 (Astana Pro Team) ==
As of 1 January 2014.

Rider	Date of birth
Valerio Agnoli (ITA)	6 January 1985 (aged 28)
Fabio Aru (ITA)	3 July 1990 (aged 23)
Borut Božič (SLO)	8 August 1980 (aged 33)
Janez Brajkovič (SLO)	18 December 1983 (aged 30)
Alexsandr Dyachenko (KAZ)	17 October 1983 (aged 30)
Daniil Fominykh (KAZ)	28 August 1991 (aged 22)
Jakob Fuglsang (DEN)	22 March 1985 (aged 28)
Enrico Gasparotto (ITA)	22 March 1982 (aged 31)
Francesco Gavazzi (ITA)	1 August 1984 (aged 29)
Dmitriy Gruzdev (KAZ)	13 March 1986 (aged 27)
Andrea Guardini (ITA)	12 June 1989 (aged 24)
Jacopo Guarnieri (ITA)	14 August 1987 (aged 26)
Andriy Hrivko (UKR)	7 August 1983 (aged 30)
Evan Huffman (USA)	7 January 1990 (aged 23)
Maxim Iglinsky (KAZ)	18 April 1981 (aged 32)

Rider	Date of birth
Valentin Iglinsky (KAZ)	12 May 1984 (aged 29)
Arman Kamyshev (KAZ)	14 March 1991 (aged 22)
Tanel Kangert (EST)	11 March 1987 (aged 26)
Fredrik Kessiakoff (SWE)	17 May 1980 (aged 33)
Mikel Landa (ESP)	13 December 1989 (aged 24)
Alexey Lutsenko (KAZ)	7 September 1992 (aged 21)
Dimitry Muravyev (KAZ)	2 November 1979 (aged 34)
Vincenzo Nibali (ITA)	14 November 1984 (aged 29)
Michele Scarponi (ITA)	25 September 1979 (aged 34)
Paolo Tiralongo (ITA)	8 July 1977 (aged 36)
Ruslan Tleubayev (KAZ)	7 March 1987 (aged 26)
Alessandro Vanotti (ITA)	16 September 1980 (aged 33)
Lieuwe Westra (NED)	11 September 1982 (aged 31)
Andrey Zeits (KAZ)	14 December 1986 (aged 27)

== 2015 (Astana Pro Team) ==
As of 1 January 2015.

Rider	Date of birth
Valerio Agnoli (ITA)	6 January 1985 (aged 30)
Fabio Aru (ITA)	3 July 1990 (aged 24)
Maxat Ayazbayev (KAZ)	27 January 1992 (aged 22)
Lars Boom (NED)	30 December 1985 (aged 29)
Borut Božič (SLO)	8 August 1980 (aged 34)
Dario Cataldo (ITA)	17 March 1985 (aged 29)
Laurens De Vreese (BEL)	29 September 1988 (aged 26)
Alexsandr Dyachenko (KAZ)	17 October 1983 (aged 31)
Daniil Fominykh (KAZ)	28 August 1991 (aged 23)
Jakob Fuglsang (DEN)	22 March 1985 (aged 29)
Dmitriy Gruzdev (KAZ)	13 March 1986 (aged 29)
Andrea Guardini (ITA)	12 June 1989 (aged 25)
Andriy Hrivko (UKR)	7 August 1983 (aged 31)
Arman Kamyshev (KAZ)	14 March 1991 (aged 24)
Tanel Kangert (EST)	11 March 1987 (aged 27)

Rider	Date of birth
Bakhtiyar Kozhatayev (KAZ)	28 March 1992 (aged 22)
Mikel Landa (ESP)	13 December 1989 (aged 25)
Miguel Ángel López (COL)	4 February 1994 (aged 20)
Alexey Lutsenko (KAZ)	7 September 1992 (aged 22)
Davide Malacarne (ITA)	11 June 1987 (aged 27)
Vincenzo Nibali (ITA)	14 November 1984 (aged 30)
Diego Rosa (ITA)	27 March 1989 (aged 25)
Luis León Sánchez (ESP)	24 November 1983 (aged 31)
Michele Scarponi (ITA)	25 September 1979 (aged 35)
Rein Taaramäe (EST)	24 April 1987 (aged 27)
Paolo Tiralongo (ITA)	8 July 1977 (aged 37)
Ruslan Tleubayev (KAZ)	7 March 1987 (aged 27)
Alessandro Vanotti (ITA)	16 September 1980 (aged 34)
Lieuwe Westra (NED)	11 September 1982 (aged 32)
Andrey Zeits (KAZ)	14 December 1986 (aged 28)

== 2016 (Astana Pro Team) ==
As of 29 March 2016

Rider	Date of birth
Valerio Agnoli (ITA)	6 January 1985 (aged 31)
Fabio Aru (ITA)	3 July 1990 (aged 25)
Maxat Ayazbayev (KAZ)	27 January 1992 (aged 24)
Lars Boom (NED)	30 December 1985 (aged 30)
Eros Capecchi (ITA)	13 June 1986 (aged 29)
Dario Cataldo (ITA)	17 March 1985 (aged 31)
Laurens De Vreese (BEL)	29 September 1988 (aged 27)
Daniil Fominykh (KAZ)	28 August 1991 (aged 24)
Jakob Fuglsang (DEN)	22 March 1985 (aged 31)
Dmitriy Gruzdev (KAZ)	13 March 1986 (aged 30)
Andrea Guardini (ITA)	12 June 1989 (aged 26)
Andriy Hrivko (UKR)	7 August 1983 (aged 32)
Arman Kamyshev (KAZ)	14 March 1991 (aged 25)
Tanel Kangert (EST)	11 March 1987 (aged 29)

Rider	Date of birth
Bakhtiyar Kozhatayev (KAZ)	28 March 1992 (aged 24)
Miguel Ángel López (COL)	4 February 1994 (aged 22)
Alexey Lutsenko (KAZ)	7 September 1992 (aged 23)
Davide Malacarne (ITA)	11 June 1987 (aged 28)
Vincenzo Nibali (ITA)	14 November 1984 (aged 31)
Diego Rosa (ITA)	27 March 1989 (aged 27)
Luis León Sánchez (ESP)	24 November 1983 (aged 32)
Michele Scarponi (ITA)	25 September 1979 (aged 36)
Gatis Smukulis (LAT)	15 April 1987 (aged 28)
Paolo Tiralongo (ITA)	8 July 1977 (aged 38)
Ruslan Tleubayev (KAZ)	7 March 1987 (aged 29)
Alessandro Vanotti (ITA)	16 September 1980 (aged 35)
Lieuwe Westra (NED)	11 September 1982 (aged 33)
Andrey Zeits (KAZ)	14 December 1986 (aged 29)

== 2017 (Astana Pro Team) ==
As of 1 January 2017

Rider	Date of birth
Fabio Aru (ITA)	3 July 1990 (aged 27)
Pello Bilbao (ESP)	25 February 1990 (aged 27)
Zhandos Bizhigitov (KAZ)	10 June 1991 (aged 26)
Matti Breschel (DEN)	31 August 1984 (aged 32)
Dario Cataldo (ITA)	17 March 1985 (aged 31)
Sergey Chernetskiy (RUS)	9 April 1990 (aged 26)
Laurens de Vreese (BEL)	29 September 1988 (aged 28)
Daniil Fominykh (KAZ)	28 August 1991 (aged 25)
Jakob Fuglsang (DEN)	22 March 1985 (aged 31)
Oscar Gatto (ITA)	1 January 1985 (aged 32)
Yevgeniy Gidich (KAZ)	19 May 1996 (aged 20)
Andriy Grivko (UKR)	7 August 1983 (aged 33)
Dmitriy Gruzdev (KAZ)	13 March 1986 (aged 30)
Jesper Hansen (DEN)	23 October 1990 (aged 26)
Arman Kamyshev (KAZ)	14 March 1991 (aged 25)
Tanel Kangert (EST)	11 March 1987 (aged 29)

Rider	Date of birth
Truls Engen Korsæth (NOR)	16 September 1993 (aged 23)
Bakhtiyar Kozhatayev (KAZ)	28 March 1992 (aged 24)
Miguel Ángel López (COL)	4 February 1994 (aged 22)
Alexey Lutsenko (KAZ)	7 September 1992 (aged 24)
Riccardo Minali (ITA)	19 April 1995 (aged 21)
Moreno Moser (ITA)	25 December 1990 (aged 26)
Luis León Sánchez (ESP)	24 November 1983 (aged 33)
Michele Scarponi (Note: Scarponi died on 22 April as a result of a crash during a training ride.) (ITA)	25 September 1979 (aged 37)
Nikita Stalnov (KAZ)	14 September 1991 (aged 25)
Paolo Tiralongo (ITA)	8 July 1977 (aged 39)
Ruslan Tleubayev (KAZ)	7 March 1987 (aged 29)
Michael Valgren (DEN)	7 February 1992 (aged 24)
Artyom Zakharov (KAZ)	27 October 1991 (aged 25)
Andrey Zeits (KAZ)	14 December 1986 (aged 30)

== 2018 (Astana Pro Team) ==
As of 7 March 2018.

Rider	Date of birth
Pello Bilbao (ESP)	25 February 1990 (aged 28)
Zhandos Bizhigitov (KAZ)	10 June 1991 (aged 26)
Dario Cataldo (ITA)	17 March 1985 (aged 32)
Sergey Chernetskiy (RUS)	9 April 1990 (aged 27)
Magnus Cort (DEN)	16 January 1993 (aged 25)
Laurens De Vreese (BEL)	29 September 1988 (aged 29)
Daniil Fominykh (KAZ)	28 August 1991 (aged 26)
Omar Fraile (ESP)	17 July 1990 (aged 27)
Jakob Fuglsang (DEN)	22 March 1985 (aged 32)
Oscar Gatto (ITA)	1 January 1985 (aged 33)
Yevgeniy Gidich (KAZ)	19 May 1996 (aged 21)
Dmitriy Gruzdev (KAZ)	13 March 1986 (aged 31)
Jesper Hansen (DEN)	23 October 1990 (aged 27)
Jan Hirt (CZE)	21 January 1991 (aged 27)
Hugo Houle (CAN)	27 September 1990 (aged 27)

Rider	Date of birth
Andriy Hrivko (UKR)	7 August 1983 (aged 34)
Tanel Kangert (EST)	11 March 1987 (aged 30)
Truls Korsæth (NOR)	16 September 1993 (aged 24)
Bakhtiyar Kozhatayev (KAZ)	28 March 1992 (aged 25)
Miguel Ángel López (COL)	4 February 1994 (aged 24)
Alexey Lutsenko (KAZ)	7 September 1992 (aged 25)
Riccardo Minali (ITA)	19 April 1995 (aged 22)
Moreno Moser (ITA)	25 December 1990 (aged 27)
Luis León Sánchez (ESP)	24 November 1983 (aged 34)
Nikita Stalnov (KAZ)	14 September 1991 (aged 26)
Ruslan Tleubayev (KAZ)	7 March 1987 (aged 31)
Michael Valgren (DEN)	7 February 1992 (aged 26)
Davide Villella (ITA)	27 June 1991 (aged 26)
Artyom Zakharov (KAZ)	27 October 1991 (aged 26)
Andrey Zeits (KAZ)	14 December 1986 (aged 31)

== 2019 (Astana Pro Team) ==
As of 24 December 2018.

Rider	Date of birth
Davide Ballerini (ITA)	21 September 1994 (aged 24)
Pello Bilbao (ESP)	25 February 1990 (aged 28)
Zhandos Bizhigitov (KAZ)	10 June 1991 (aged 27)
Manuele Boaro (ITA)	12 March 1987 (aged 31)
Hernando Bohórquez (COL)	22 June 1992 (aged 26)
Dario Cataldo (ITA)	17 March 1985 (aged 33)
Rodrigo Contreras (COL)	2 June 1994 (aged 24)
Magnus Cort (DEN)	16 January 1993 (aged 25)
Laurens De Vreese (BEL)	29 September 1988 (aged 30)
Daniil Fominykh (KAZ)	28 August 1991 (aged 27)
Omar Fraile (ESP)	17 July 1990 (aged 28)
Jakob Fuglsang (DEN)	22 March 1985 (aged 33)
Yevgeniy Gidich (KAZ)	19 May 1996 (aged 22)
Jonas Gregaard Wilsly (DEN)	30 July 1996 (aged 22)

Rider	Date of birth
Dmitriy Gruzdev (KAZ)	13 March 1986 (aged 32)
Jan Hirt (CZE)	21 January 1991 (aged 27)
Hugo Houle (CAN)	27 September 1990 (aged 28)
Ion Izagirre (ESP)	4 February 1989 (aged 29)
Gorka Izagirre (ESP)	7 October 1987 (aged 31)
Merhawi Kudus (ERI)	23 January 1994 (aged 24)
Miguel Ángel López (COL)	4 February 1994 (aged 24)
Alexey Lutsenko (KAZ)	7 September 1992 (aged 26)
Yuriy Natarov (KAZ)	28 December 1996 (aged 21)
Luis León Sánchez (ESP)	24 November 1983 (aged 35)
Nikita Stalnov (KAZ)	14 September 1991 (aged 27)
Davide Villella (ITA)	27 June 1991 (aged 27)
Artyom Zakharov (KAZ)	27 October 1991 (aged 27)
Andrey Zeits (KAZ)	14 December 1986 (aged 32)

== 2020 (Astana Pro Team) ==
As of 1 January 2020.

Rider	Date of birth
Alex Aranburu (ESP)	19 September 1995 (aged 24)
Zhandos Bizhigitov (KAZ)	10 June 1991 (aged 28)
Manuele Boaro (ITA)	12 March 1987 (aged 32)
Hernando Bohórquez (COL)	22 June 1992 (aged 27)
Rodrigo Contreras (COL)	2 June 1994 (aged 25)
Laurens De Vreese (BEL)	29 September 1988 (aged 31)
Fabio Felline (ITA)	29 March 1990 (aged 29)
Daniil Fominykh (KAZ)	28 August 1991 (aged 28)
Omar Fraile (ESP)	17 July 1990 (aged 29)
Jakob Fuglsang (DEN)	22 March 1985 (aged 34)
Yevgeniy Gidich (KAZ)	19 May 1996 (aged 23)
Jonas Gregaard (DEN)	30 July 1996 (aged 23)
Dmitriy Gruzdev (KAZ)	13 March 1986 (aged 33)
Hugo Houle (CAN)	27 September 1990 (aged 29)

Rider	Date of birth
Ion Izagirre (ESP)	4 February 1989 (aged 30)
Gorka Izagirre (ESP)	7 October 1987 (aged 32)
Merhawi Kudus (ERI)	23 January 1994 (aged 25)
Miguel Ángel López (COL)	4 February 1994 (aged 25)
Alexey Lutsenko (KAZ)	7 September 1992 (aged 27)
Davide Martinelli (ITA)	31 May 1993 (aged 26)
Yuriy Natarov (KAZ)	28 December 1996 (aged 23)
Vadim Pronskiy (KAZ)	4 June 1998 (aged 21)
Óscar Rodríguez (ESP)	6 May 1995 (aged 24)
Luis León Sánchez (ESP)	24 November 1983 (aged 36)
Nikita Stalnov (KAZ)	14 September 1991 (aged 28)
Harold Tejada (COL)	27 April 1997 (aged 22)
Aleksandr Vlasov (RUS)	23 April 1996 (aged 23)
Artyom Zakharov (KAZ)	27 October 1991 (aged 28)

== 2021 (Astana–Premier Tech) ==
As of 1 January 2021.

Rider	Date of birth
Alex Aranburu (ESP)	19 September 1995 (age 30)
Samuele Battistella (ITA)	14 November 1998 (age 27)
Manuele Boaro (ITA)	12 March 1987 (age 39)
Gleb Brussenskiy (KAZ)	18 April 2000 (age 26)
Rodrigo Contreras (COL)	2 June 1994 (age 31)
Stefan de Bod (RSA)	17 November 1996 (age 29)
Yevgeniy Fedorov (KAZ)	16 February 2000 (age 26)
Fabio Felline (ITA)	29 March 1990 (age 36)
Omar Fraile (ESP)	17 July 1990 (age 35)
Jakob Fuglsang (DEN)	22 March 1985 (age 41)
Yevgeniy Gidich (KAZ)	19 May 1996 (age 30)
Jonas Gregaard (DEN)	30 July 1996 (age 29)
Dmitriy Gruzdev (KAZ)	13 March 1986 (age 40)
Hugo Houle (CAN)	27 September 1990 (age 35)
Gorka Izagirre (ESP)	7 October 1987 (age 38)
Ion Izagirre (ESP)	4 February 1989 (age 37)

Rider	Date of birth
Merhawi Kudus (ERI)	23 January 1994 (age 32)
Alexey Lutsenko (KAZ)	7 September 1992 (age 33)
Davide Martinelli (ITA)	31 May 1993 (age 32)
Yuriy Natarov (KAZ)	28 December 1996 (age 29)
Ben Perry (CAN)	7 March 1994 (age 32)
Andrea Piccolo (ITA)	23 March 2001 (age 25)
Vadim Pronskiy (KAZ)	4 June 1998 (age 27)
Óscar Rodríguez (ESP)	6 May 1995 (age 31)
Javier Romo (ESP)	6 January 1999 (age 27)
Luis León Sánchez (ESP)	24 November 1983 (age 42)
Matteo Sobrero (ITA)	14 May 1997 (age 29)
Nikita Stalnov (KAZ)	14 September 1991 (age 34)
Harold Tejada (COL)	27 April 1997 (age 29)
Aleksandr Vlasov (RUS)	23 April 1996 (age 30)
Artyom Zakharov (KAZ)	27 October 1991 (age 34)

== 2022 (Astana Qazaqstan Team) ==
As of 3 January 2022.

Rider	Date of birth
Leonardo Basso (ITA)	25 December 1993 (age 32)
Samuele Battistella (ITA)	14 November 1998 (age 27)
Manuele Boaro (ITA)	12 March 1987 (age 39)
Gleb Brussenskiy (KAZ)	18 April 2000 (age 26)
Valerio Conti (ITA)	30 March 1993 (age 33)
Stefan de Bod (RSA)	17 November 1996 (age 29)
David de la Cruz (ESP)	6 May 1989 (age 37)
Joe Dombrowski (USA)	12 May 1991 (age 35)
Yevgeniy Fedorov (KAZ)	16 February 2000 (age 26)
Fabio Felline (ITA)	29 March 1990 (age 36)
Michele Gazzoli (ITA)	14 March 1999 (age 27)
Yevgeniy Gidich (KAZ)	19 May 1996 (age 30)
Dmitriy Gruzdev (KAZ)	13 March 1986 (age 40)
Sebastián Henao (COL)	5 August 1993 (age 32)
Miguel Ángel López (COL)	4 April 1994 (age 32)

Rider	Date of birth
Alexey Lutsenko (KAZ)	7 September 1992 (age 33)
Davide Martinelli (ITA)	31 May 1993 (age 32)
Gianni Moscon (ITA)	20 April 1994 (age 32)
Yuriy Natarov (KAZ)	28 December 1996 (age 29)
Antonio Nibali (ITA)	23 September 1992 (age 33)
Vincenzo Nibali (ITA)	14 November 1984 (age 41)
Nurbergen Nurlykhassym (KAZ)	25 March 2000 (age 26)
Vadim Pronskiy (KAZ)	4 June 1998 (age 27)
Alexandr Riabushenko (BLR)	12 October 1995 (age 30)
Javier Romo (ESP)	6 January 1999 (age 27)
Harold Tejada (COL)	27 April 1997 (age 29)
Simone Velasco (ITA)	2 December 1995 (age 30)
Artyom Zakharov (KAZ)	27 October 1991 (age 34)
Andrey Zeits (KAZ)	14 December 1986 (age 39)

== 2023 (Astana Qazaqstan Team) ==
As of 18 January 2023.

Rider	Date of birth
Leonardo Basso (ITA)	25 December 1993 (age 32)
Samuele Battistella (ITA)	14 November 1998 (age 27)
Manuele Boaro (ITA)	12 March 1987 (age 39)
Cees Bol (NED)	27 July 1995 (age 30)
Gleb Brussenskiy (KAZ)	18 April 2000 (age 26)
Mark Cavendish (GBR)	21 May 1985 (age 41)
Igor Chzhan (KAZ)	2 October 1999 (age 26)
David de la Cruz (ESP)	6 May 1989 (age 37)
Joe Dombrowski (USA)	12 May 1991 (age 35)
Yevgeniy Fedorov (KAZ)	16 February 2000 (age 26)
Fabio Felline (ITA)	29 March 1990 (age 36)
Gianmarco Garofoli (ITA)	6 October 2002 (age 23)
Yevgeniy Gidich (KAZ)	19 May 1996 (age 30)
Dmitriy Gruzdev (KAZ)	13 March 1986 (age 40)
Martin Laas (EST)	15 September 1993 (age 32)

Rider	Date of birth
Alexey Lutsenko (KAZ)	7 September 1992 (age 33)
Davide Martinelli (ITA)	31 May 1993 (age 32)
Gianni Moscon (ITA)	20 April 1994 (age 32)
Yuriy Natarov (KAZ)	28 December 1996 (age 29)
Antonio Nibali (ITA)	23 September 1992 (age 33)
Nurbergen Nurlykhassym (KAZ)	25 March 2000 (age 26)
Vadim Pronskiy (KAZ)	4 June 1998 (age 27)
Alexandr Riabushenko (BLR)	12 October 1995 (age 30)
Javier Romo (ESP)	6 January 1999 (age 27)
Luis León Sánchez (ESP)	24 November 1983 (age 42)
Christian Scaroni (ITA)	16 October 1997 (age 28)
Gleb Syritsa (RUS)	14 April 2000 (age 26)
Harold Tejada (COL)	27 April 1997 (age 29)
Simone Velasco (ITA)	2 December 1995 (age 30)
Andrey Zeits (KAZ)	14 December 1986 (age 39)

== 2024 (Astana Qazaqstan Team) ==
As of 10 January 2024.

Rider	Date of birth
Davide Ballerini (ITA)	21 September 1994 (age 31)
Samuele Battistella (ITA)	14 November 1998 (age 27)
Cees Bol (NED)	27 July 1995 (age 30)
Gleb Brussenskiy (KAZ)	18 April 2000 (age 26)
Mark Cavendish (GBR)	21 May 1985 (age 41)
Anthon Charmig (DEN)	25 March 1998 (age 28)
Igor Chzhan (KAZ)	2 October 1999 (age 26)
Yevgeniy Fedorov (KAZ)	16 February 2000 (age 26)
Lorenzo Fortunato (ITA)	9 May 1996 (age 30)
Gianmarco Garofoli (ITA)	6 October 2002 (age 23)
Michele Gazzoli (ITA)	4 March 1999 (age 27)
Yevgeniy Gidich (KAZ)	19 May 1996 (age 30)
Dmitriy Gruzdev (KAZ)	13 March 1986 (age 40)
Max Kanter (GER)	22 October 1997 (age 28)
Anton Kuzmin (KAZ)	20 November 1996 (age 29)

Rider	Date of birth
Harold Martín López (ECU)	3 December 2000 (age 25)
Alexey Lutsenko (KAZ)	7 September 1992 (age 33)
Daniil Marukhin (KAZ)	13 February 1999 (age 27)
Michael Mørkøv (DEN)	30 April 1985 (age 41)
Henok Mulubrhan (ERI)	11 November 1999 (age 26)
Vadim Pronskiy (KAZ)	4 June 1998 (age 27)
Christian Scaroni (ITA)	16 October 1997 (age 28)
Ide Schelling (NED)	6 February 1998 (age 28)
Rüdiger Selig (GER)	19 February 1989 (age 37)
Gleb Syritsa (RUS)	14 April 2000 (age 26)
Harold Tejada (COL)	27 April 1997 (age 29)
Santiago Umba (COL)	20 November 2002 (age 23)
Simone Velasco (ITA)	2 December 1995 (age 30)
Nicolas Vinokurov (KAZ)	7 July 2002 (age 23)

== 2025 (XDS Astana Team) ==
As of 8 January 2025.

Rider	Date of birth
Davide Ballerini (ITA)	21 September 1994 (age 31)
Alberto Bettiol (ITA)	29 October 1993 (age 32)
Cees Bol (NED)	27 July 1995 (age 30)
Clément Champoussin (FRA)	29 May 1998 (age 28)
Anthon Charmig (DEN)	25 March 1998 (age 28)
Nicola Conci (ITA)	5 January 1997 (age 29)
Yevgeniy Fedorov (KAZ)	16 February 2000 (age 26)
Lorenzo Fortunato (ITA)	9 May 1996 (age 30)
Aaron Gate (NZL)	26 November 1990 (age 35)
Michele Gazzoli (ITA)	4 March 1999 (age 27)
Sergio Higuita (COL)	1 August 1997 (age 28)
Florian Samuel Kajamini (ITA)	28 February 2003 (age 23)
Max Kanter (GER)	22 October 1997 (age 28)
Anton Kuzmin (KAZ)	20 November 1996 (age 29)
Harold Martín López (ECU)	3 December 2000 (age 25)

Rider	Date of birth
Matteo Malucelli (ITA)	20 October 1993 (age 32)
Fausto Masnada (ITA)	6 November 1993 (age 32)
Henok Mulubrhan (ERI)	11 November 1999 (age 26)
Wout Poels (NED)	1 October 1987 (age 38)
Alessandro Romele (ITA)	30 August 2003 (age 22)
Christian Scaroni (ITA)	16 October 1997 (age 28)
Ide Schelling (NED)	6 February 1998 (age 28)
Su Haoyu (CHN)	26 October 2000 (age 25)
Harold Tejada (COL)	27 April 1997 (age 29)
Mike Teunissen (NED)	25 August 1992 (age 33)
Davide Toneatti (ITA)	9 April 2001 (age 25)
Diego Ulissi (ITA)	15 July 1989 (age 36)
Darren van Bekkum (NED)	20 March 2002 (age 24)
Simone Velasco (ITA)	2 December 1995 (age 30)
Nicolas Vinokurov (KAZ)	7 July 2002 (age 23)

== 2026 (XDS Astana Team) ==
As of 11 March 2026.

Rider	Date of birth
Davide Ballerini (ITA)	21 September 1994 (age 31)
Alberto Bettiol (ITA)	29 October 1993 (age 32)
Clément Champoussin (FRA)	29 May 1998 (age 28)
Nicola Conci (ITA)	5 January 1997 (age 29)
Yevgeniy Fedorov (KAZ)	16 February 2000 (age 26)
Lorenzo Fortunato (ITA)	9 May 1996 (age 30)
Aaron Gate (NZL)	26 November 1990 (age 35)
Lev Gonov (RUS)	6 January 2000 (age 26)
Sergio Higuita (COL)	1 August 1997 (age 28)
Florian Samuel Kajamini (ITA)	28 February 2003 (age 23)
Max Kanter (GER)	22 October 1997 (age 28)
Anton Kuzmin (KAZ)	20 November 1996 (age 29)
Arjen Livyns (BEL)	1 September 1994 (age 31)
Harold Martín López (ECU)	3 December 2000 (age 25)
Matteo Malucelli (ITA)	20 October 1993 (age 32)

Rider	Date of birth
Henok Mulubrhan (ERI)	11 November 1999 (age 26)
Cristián Rodríguez (ESP)	3 March 1995 (age 31)
Alessandro Romele (ITA)	30 August 2003 (age 22)
Christian Scaroni (ITA)	16 October 1997 (age 28)
Marco Schrettl (AUT)	11 September 2003 (age 22)
Thomas Silva (URY)	30 December 2001 (age 24)
Su Haoyu (CHN)	26 October 2000 (age 25)
Gleb Syritsa (RUS)	14 April 2000 (age 26)
Harold Tejada (COL)	27 April 1997 (age 29)
Mike Teunissen (NED)	25 August 1992 (age 33)
Davide Toneatti (ITA)	9 April 2001 (age 25)
Diego Ulissi (ITA)	15 July 1989 (age 36)
Darren van Bekkum (NED)	20 March 2002 (age 24)
Simone Velasco (ITA)	2 December 1995 (age 30)
Nicolas Vinokurov (KAZ)	7 July 2002 (age 23)

== See also ==
- XDS Astana Team
