= 2025 Tour des Alpes-Maritimes =

2025 UCI Europe Tour

Race details
- Dates: 22–23 February 2025
- Stages: 2
- Distance: 294.2 km (182.8 mi)
- Winning time: 7h 28' 47"

Results
Jersey awarded to the overall winner	Winner	Christian Scaroni (ITA)	(XDS Astana Team)
	Second	Santiago Buitrago (COL)	(Team Bahrain Victorious)
	Third	Lenny Martinez (FRA)	(Team Bahrain Victorious)
Jersey awarded to the points classification winner	Points	Joseph Blackmore (GBR)	(Israel–Premier Tech)
Jersey awarded to the mountains classification winner	Mountains	Kenny Molly (BEL)	(Van Rysel–Roubaix)
Jersey awarded to the youth classification winner	Youth	Lenny Martinez (FRA)	(Team Bahrain Victorious)
	Team	Team Bahrain Victorious	

The 2025 Tour des Alpes-Maritimes was a road cycling stage race that took place between 22 and 23 February 2025 in the department of Alpes-Maritimes in southeastern France. The race was rated as a category 2.1 event on the 2025 UCI Europe Tour calendar, and was the 57th edition of the Tour des Alpes-Maritimes.

== Teams ==
Eight UCI WorldTeams, four UCI ProTeams, and four UCI Continental teams made up the 16 teams that participated in the race.

UCI WorldTeams

- Arkéa–B&B Hotels
- Cofidis
- Decathlon–AG2R La Mondiale
- Groupama–FDJ
- EF Education–EasyPost
- Intermarché–Wanty
- Team Bahrain Victorious
- XDS Astana Team

UCI ProTeams

- Israel–Premier Tech
- Lotto
- Unibet Tietema Rockets
- Team TotalEnergies

UCI Continental Teams

- CIC–U–Nantes
- Nice Métropole Côte d'Azur
- St. Michel–Preference Home–Auber93
- Van Rysel–Roubaix

== Route ==
Stage characteristics and winners
Stage	Date	Course	Distance	Type	Stage winner
1	22 February	Contes to Gourdon	162.4 km (100.9 mi)	Medium mountain stage	Christian Scaroni (ITA)
2	23 February	Villefranche-sur-Mer to Vence	131.8 km (81.9 mi)	Hilly stage	Dorian Godon (FRA)
Total			297.3 km (184.7 mi)		

== Stages ==
=== Stage 1 ===
22 February 2025 – Contes to Gourdon, 162.4 km (100.9 mi)

Stage 1 Result (1–10)
Rank	Rider	Team	Time
1	Christian Scaroni (ITA)	XDS Astana Team	4h 19' 45"
2	Santiago Buitrago (COL)	Team Bahrain Victorious	+ 0"
3	Lenny Martinez (FRA)	Team Bahrain Victorious	+ 4"
4	Lorenzo Fortunato (ITA)	XDS Astana Team	+ 47"
5	Jarno Widar (BEL)	Lotto	+ 47"
6	Guillaume Martin (FRA)	Groupama–FDJ	+ 47"
7	Aurélien Paret-Peintre (FRA)	Decathlon–AG2R La Mondiale	+ 52"
8	Joseph Blackmore (GBR)	Israel–Premier Tech	+ 54"
9	Ewen Costiou (FRA)	Arkéa–B&B Hotels	+ 54"
10	Richard Carapaz (ECU)	EF Education–EasyPost	+ 59"

General classification after Stage 1 (1–10)
Rank	Rider	Team	Time
1	Christian Scaroni (ITA)	XDS Astana Team	4h 19' 35"
2	Santiago Buitrago (COL)	Team Bahrain Victorious	+ 4"
3	Lenny Martinez (FRA)	Team Bahrain Victorious	+ 10"
4	Lorenzo Fortunato (ITA)	XDS Astana Team	+ 57"
5	Jarno Widar (BEL)	Lotto	+ 57"
6	Guillaume Martin (FRA)	Groupama–FDJ	+ 57"
7	Aurélien Paret-Peintre (FRA)	Decathlon–AG2R La Mondiale	+ 1' 02"
8	Joseph Blackmore (GBR)	Israel–Premier Tech	+ 1' 04"
9	Ewen Costiou (FRA)	Arkéa–B&B Hotels	+ 1' 04"
10	Richard Carapaz (ECU)	EF Education–EasyPost	+ 1' 09"

=== Stage 2 ===
23 February 2025 – Villefranche-sur-Mer to Vence, 131.8 km (81.9 mi)

Stage 2 Result (1–10)
Rank	Rider	Team	Time
1	Dorian Godon (FRA)	Decathlon–AG2R La Mondiale	3h 19' 45"
2	Joseph Blackmore (GBR)	Israel–Premier Tech	+ 0"
3	Nicola Conci (ITA)	XDS Astana Team	+ 0"
4	Clément Champoussin (FRA)	XDS Astana Team	+ 0"
5	Andrea Mifsud (MLT)	Nice Métropole Côte d'Azur	+ 0"
6	Jordan Jegat (FRA)	Team TotalEnergies	+ 0"
7	Simone Gualdi (ITA)	Intermarché–Wanty	+ 0"
8	Adrien Maire (FRA)	Unibet Tietema Rockets	+ 0"
9	Quentin Pacher (FRA)	Groupama–FDJ	+ 0"
10	Martin Tjøtta (NOR)	Arkéa–B&B Hotels	+ 0"

General classification after Stage 2 (1–10)
Rank	Rider	Team	Time
1	Christian Scaroni (ITA)	XDS Astana Team	7h 28' 47"
2	Santiago Buitrago (COL)	Team Bahrain Victorious	+ 10"
3	Lenny Martinez (FRA)	Team Bahrain Victorious	+ 12"
4	Joseph Blackmore (GBR)	Israel–Premier Tech	+ 57"
5	Lorenzo Fortunato (ITA)	XDS Astana Team	+ 58"
6	Guillaume Martin (FRA)	Groupama–FDJ	+ 59"
7	Jarno Widar (BEL)	Lotto	+ 59"
8	Aurélien Paret-Peintre (FRA)	Decathlon–AG2R La Mondiale	+ 1' 04"
9	Richard Carapaz (ECU)	EF Education–EasyPost	+ 1' 11"
10	Louis Barré (FRA)	Intermarché–Wanty	+ 1' 15"

== Classification leadership table ==
Classification leadership by stage
Stage	Winner	General classification	Points classification	Mountains classification	Young rider classification	Team classification
1	Christian Scaroni	Christian Scaroni	Baptiste Veistroffer	Kenny Molly	Lenny Martinez	Team Bahrain Victorious
2	Dorian Godon	Christian Scaroni	Joseph Blackmore	Kenny Molly	Lenny Martinez	Team Bahrain Victorious
Final		Christian Scaroni	Joseph Blackmore	Kenny Molly	Lenny Martinez	Team Bahrain Victorious

== Final classification standings ==
Legend
Denotes the leader of the general classification	Denotes the leader of the mountains classification
Denotes the leader of the points classification	Denotes the leader of the young rider classification

=== General classification ===
Final general classification (1–10)
Rank	Rider	Team	Time
1	Christian Scaroni (ITA)	XDS Astana Team	7h 28' 47"
2	Santiago Buitrago (COL)	Team Bahrain Victorious	+ 10"
3	Lenny Martinez (FRA)	Team Bahrain Victorious	+ 12"
4	Joseph Blackmore (GBR)	Israel–Premier Tech	+ 57"
5	Lorenzo Fortunato (ITA)	XDS Astana Team	+ 58"
6	Guillaume Martin (FRA)	Groupama–FDJ	+ 59"
7	Jarno Widar (BEL)	Lotto	+ 59"
8	Aurélien Paret-Peintre (FRA)	Decathlon–AG2R La Mondiale	+ 1' 04"
9	Richard Carapaz (ECU)	EF Education–EasyPost	+ 1' 11"
10	Louis Barré (FRA)	Intermarché–Wanty	+ 1' 15"

=== Points classification ===
Final points classification (1–10)
Rank	Rider	Team	Points
1	Joseph Blackmore (GBR)	Israel–Premier Tech	12
2	Dorian Godon (FRA)	Decathlon–AG2R La Mondiale	10
3	Louis Barré (FRA)	Intermarché–Wanty	6
4	Christian Scaroni (ITA)	XDS Astana Team	4
5	Nicola Conci (ITA)	XDS Astana Team	4
6	Harry Sweeny (AUS)	EF Education–EasyPost	4
7	Edoardo Zamperini (ITA)	Arkéa–B&B Hotels	4
8	Lorenzo Fortunato (ITA)	XDS Astana Team	2
9	Clément Champoussin (FRA)	XDS Astana Team	2
10	Riley Sheehan (USA)	Israel–Premier Tech	2

=== Mountains classification ===
Final mountains classification (1–10)
Rank	Rider	Team	Points
1	Kenny Molly (BEL)	Van Rysel–Roubaix	41
2	Harry Sweeny (AUS)	EF Education–EasyPost	41
3	Sergio Meris (ITA)	Unibet Tietema Rockets	27
4	Louis Barré (FRA)	Intermarché–Wanty	18
5	Edoardo Zamperini (ITA)	Arkéa–B&B Hotels	18
6	Odd Christian Eiking (NOR)	Unibet Tietema Rockets	15
7	Célestin Guillon (FRA)	Van Rysel–Roubaix	10
8	Jack Haig (AUS)	Team Bahrain Victorious	8
9	Darren van Bekkum (NED)	XDS Astana Team	8
10	Christian Scaroni (ITA)	XDS Astana Team	6

=== Young rider classification ===
Final young rider classification (1–10)
Rank	Rider	Team	Time
1	Lenny Martinez (FRA)	Team Bahrain Victorious	7h 28' 59"
2	Joseph Blackmore (GBR)	Israel–Premier Tech	+ 45"
3	Jarno Widar (BEL)	Lotto	+ 47"
4	Louis Barré (FRA)	Intermarché–Wanty	+ 1' 03"
5	Yaël Joalland (FRA)	CIC–U–Nantes	+ 1' 13"
6	Adrien Maire (FRA)	Unibet Tietema Rockets	+ 1' 46"
7	Ewen Costiou (FRA)	Arkéa–B&B Hotels	+ 1' 50"
8	Riley Sheehan (USA)	Israel–Premier Tech	+ 2' 07"
9	Simone Gualdi (ITA)	Intermarché–Wanty	+ 2' 29"
10	Martin Tjøtta (NOR)	Arkéa–B&B Hotels	+ 2' 29"

=== Team classification ===
Final team classification (1–10)
Rank	Team	Time
1	Team Bahrain Victorious	22h 28' 28"
2	XDS Astana Team	+ 38"
3	Decathlon–AG2R La Mondiale	+ 6' 38"
4	Intermarché–Wanty	+ 6' 57"
5	EF Education–EasyPost	+ 8' 22"
6	Groupama–FDJ	+ 11' 48"
7	Unibet Tietema Rockets	+ 11' 55"
8	Arkéa–B&B Hotels	+ 13' 06"
9	Israel–Premier Tech	+ 14' 55"
10	Lotto	+ 20' 17"
