= Kenny Molly =

Belgian cyclist

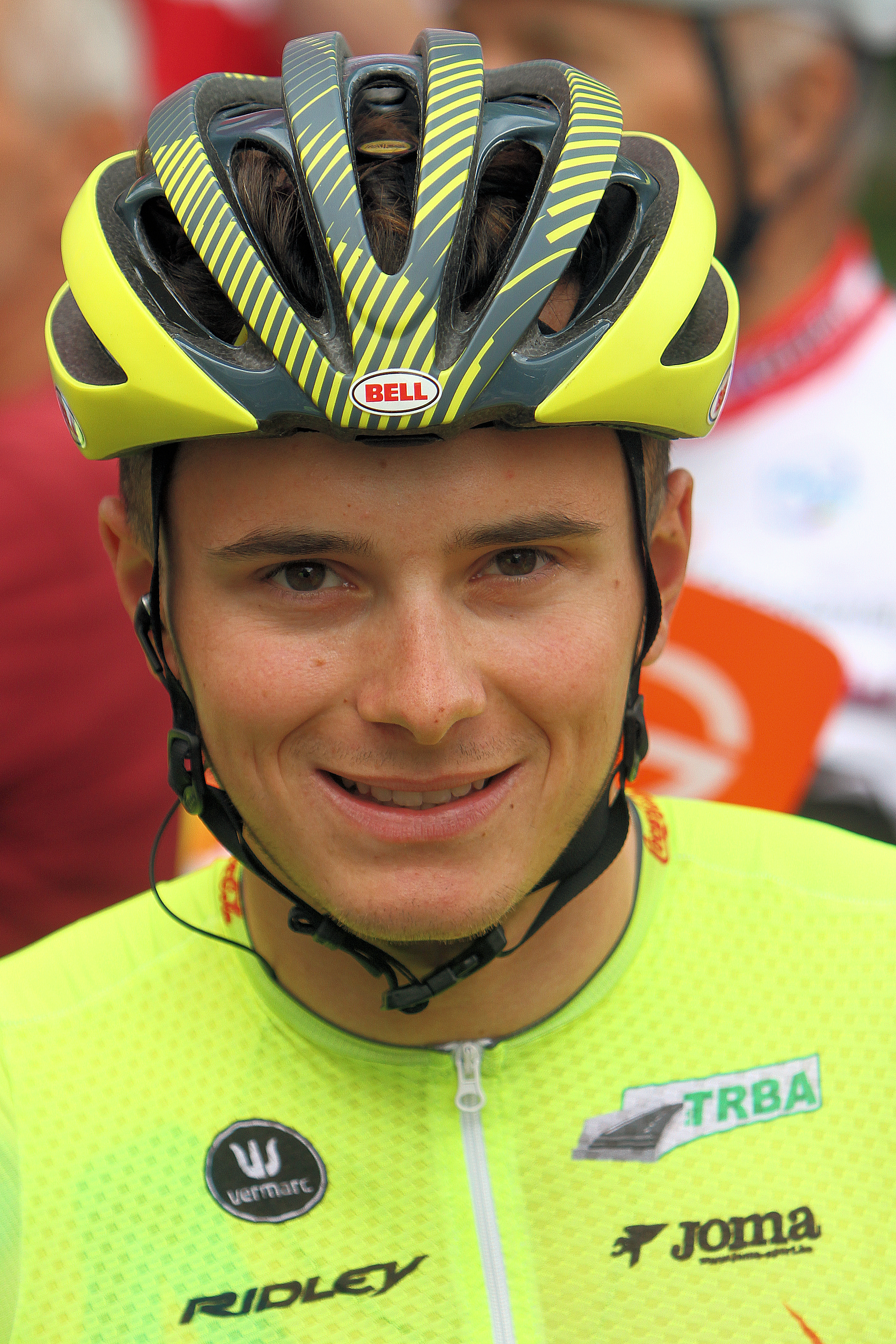
- Molly at the 2019 Tour of Austria

Personal information
- Full name: Kenny Molly
- Born: 24 December 1996 (age 29) Izegem, Belgium
- Height: 1.71 m (5 ft 7 in)
- Weight: 63 kg (139 lb)

Cycling career
- Sport: Cycling
- Current team: Van Rysel–Roubaix
- Discipline: Road
- Role: Rider

Amateur teams
- 2013–2014: Tieltse Rennersclub
- 2015: Specialized–Fundación Alberto Contador
- 2015: Color Code–Aquality Protect (stagiaire)

Professional teams
- 2016: Klein Constantia
- 2017–2018: AGO–Aqua Service
- 2017: Fortuneo–Oscaro (stagiaire)
- 2018: WB Aqua Protect Veranclassic (stagiaire)
- 2019–2022: Wallonie Bruxelles
- 2023–: Go Sport–Roubaix–Lille Métropole

Kenny Molly (born 24 December 1996 in Izegem) is a Belgian cyclist, who currently rides for UCI Continental team Van Rysel–Roubaix.

== Major results ==
2015
7th Paris–Tours Espoirs
2018
4th Eschborn–Frankfurt Under–23
10th Omloop Het Nieuwsblad Beloften
2019
9th Japan Cup
9th Paris–Troyes
2020
1st Mountains classification, Okolo Slovenska
2021
1st Mountains classification, Tour de Luxembourg
2022
8th Overall International Tour of Hellas
2025
1st Mountains classification, Tour des Alpes-Maritimes
1st Mountains classification, Tour du Limousin
2026
1st Omloop van het Waasland
