= Bakhtiyar Kozhatayev =

Kazakh cyclist

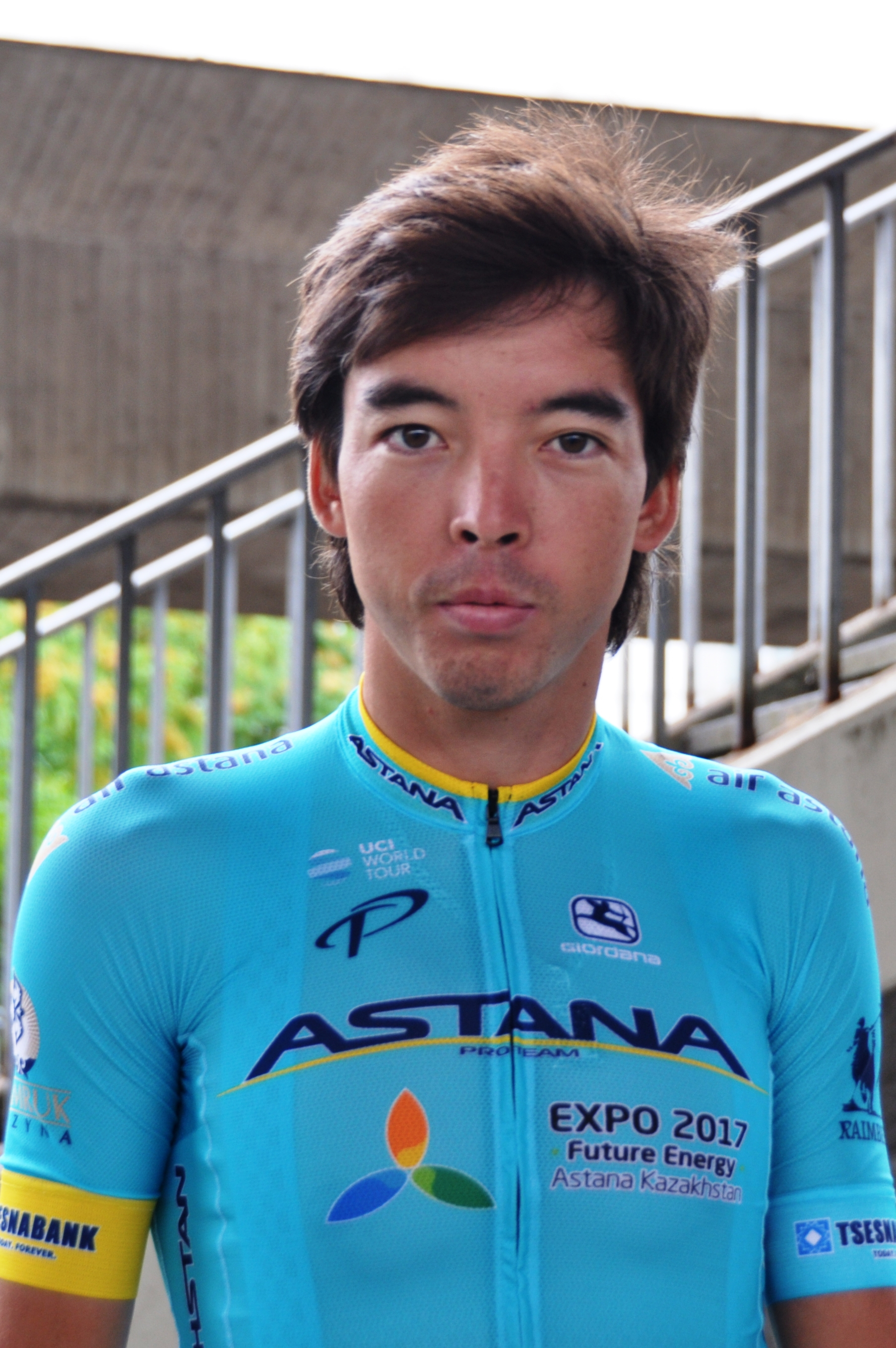
- Kozhatayev, Düsseldorf, Tour de France, 2017.

Personal information
- Full name: Bakhtiyar Kozhatayev
- Nickname: Baxa
- Born: 28 March 1992 (age 34) Petropavl, Kazakhstan
- Height: 1.72 m (5 ft 8 in)
- Weight: 62 kg (137 lb)

Cycling career
- Sport: Cycling
- Current team: Retired
- Discipline: Road
- Role: Rider

Amateur team
- 2013–2014: Continental Team Astana

Professional teams
- 2014: Astana (stagiaire)
- 2015–2018: Astana

Bakhtiyar Kozhatayev (Kazakh: Бақтияр Қожатаев Baqtiyar Qojatayev; born March 28, 1992, in Petropavl) is a Kazakh former cyclist, who rode professionally for UCI WorldTeam Astana between 2015 and 2018.

He was named in the start list for the 2016 Giro d'Italia, and the 2017 Tour de France.

== Major results ==
2012
3rd Overall Tour d'Azerbaïdjan

1st Mountains classification

2013
1st Mountains classification Le Triptyque des Monts et Châteaux
3rd Overall Tour d'Azerbaïdjan
4th Overall Tour de l'Avenir
4th Tour of Almaty
5th Overall Coupe des nations Ville Saguenay
6th Overall Tour Alsace
7th Gran Premio di Poggiana
9th GP Capodarco
2014
2nd Tour Bohemia
5th Road race, Asian Under-23 Road Championships
6th La Côte Picarde
9th Overall Giro della Valle d'Aosta
2015
1st Stage 2 (TTT) Vuelta a Burgos
7th Overall Tour of Hainan
2016
1st Stage 1 (TTT) Giro del Trentino
2017
1st Team time trial, Asian Road Championships
5th Overall Tour of Almaty

=== Grand Tour general classification results timeline ===
Grand Tour	2016	2017
Giro d'Italia	65	—
Tour de France	—	93
Vuelta a España	—	—

Legend
—	Did not compete
DNF	Did not finish
