= Joseph Blackmore =

English cyclist (born 2003)

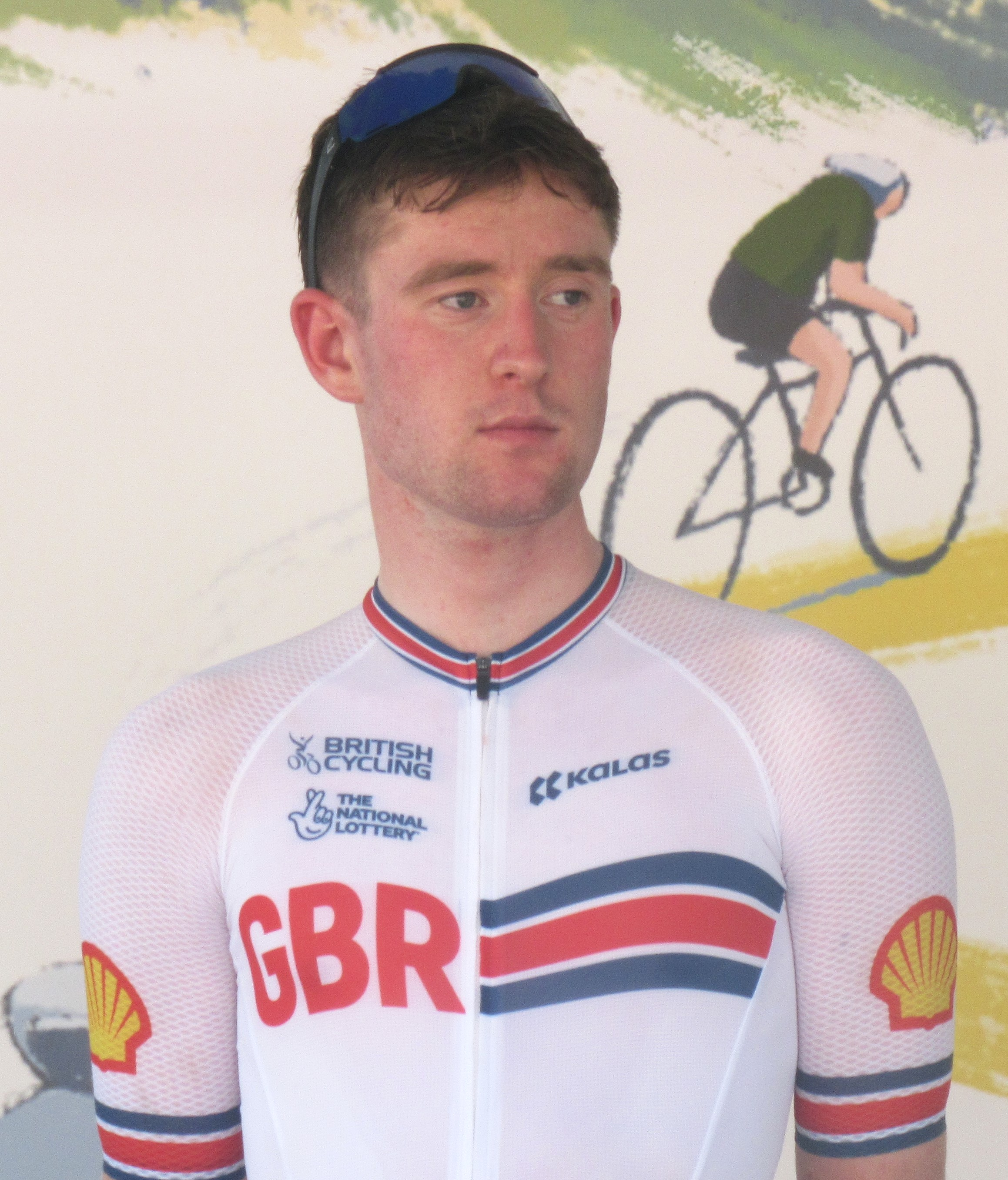
- Blackmore in 2024

Personal information
- Born: 23 February 2003 (age 23) Sidcup, London, England
- Height: 1.81 m (5 ft 11 in)
- Weight: 66 kg (146 lb)

Cycling career
- Sport: Cycling
- Current team: NSN Cycling Team
- Disciplines: Road; Mountain bike; Cyclo-cross; Gravel
- Role: Rider

Amateur team
- 2023: Team Inspired

Professional teams
- 2024: Israel Premier Tech Academy
- 2024–: Israel–Premier Tech
Medal record
Men's cyclo-cross
Representing Great Britain
World Championships
Silver medal – second place	2023 Hoogerheide	Team relay

Joseph Blackmore (born 23 February 2003) is an English cyclist, who currently rides for UCI ProTeam NSN Cycling Team.

== Biography ==
Blackmore finished third at the 2022 National Cyclo-Cross Championships. He joined Team Inspired from ROTOR Race Team.

In 2022, he was selected for the 2022 Commonwealth Games in Birmingham, where he competed in the men's mountain biking cross country and finished in 5th place, a result he counts as the best of his career.

Blackmore took his first UCI Cyclo-cross win at Clanfield in the 2022-2023 season, beating national champion Thomas Mein in the process and finished 2nd in the National Cyclocross Championships, winning the U23 title. Despite racing lightly due to a busy Mountainbike schedule finished 8th in his only U23 World Cup race of the season in France. He won the British National Gravel Championship in Suffolk in September 2023.

In 2024, Blackmore joined UCI Continental team Israel Premier Tech Academy, winning the Tour du Rwanda, Tour de Taiwan, Circuit des Ardennes and Liège–Bastogne–Liège Espoirs in the spring. He also finished fourth in the Brabantse Pijl after helping leadout teammate Dylan Teuns. After this success, he was promoted early to Israel–Premier Tech on 3 May after the retirement of Rick Zabel opened up a spot on the team.

== Major results ==
=== Cyclo-cross ===
2019–2020
National Junior Trophy Series

3rd Pembrey

2021–2022
National Trophy Series

1st Milnthorpe

3rd National Championships
3rd Clanfield
2022–2023
1st National Under-23 Championships
1st Clanfield
2nd Team relay, UCI World Championships
National Trophy Series

2nd Paignton
2nd Broughton Hall
2nd Gravesend

2nd National Championships
2nd Andover

=== Gravel ===
2023
1st National Championships

=== Mountain bike ===
2022
2nd Cross-country, National Under-23 Championships
2023
1st Cross-country, National Under-23 Championships
National XC Series

1st Margam
2nd Winchester

2nd Under-23 Heubach
2024
1st Short track, UEC European Under-23 Championships
National XC Series

1st Tong

=== Road ===
2023
6th Overall Tour du Rwanda
9th Overall Orlen Nations Grand Prix
2024 (4 pro wins)
1st Overall Tour du Rwanda

1st Stages 6 & 8

1st Overall Circuit des Ardennes

1st Points classification
1st Young rider classification
1st Stage 4

1st Overall Tour de l'Avenir

1st Points classification
1st Stage 3

1st Overall Tour de Taiwan
1st Liège–Bastogne–Liège Espoirs
3rd Road race, National Under-23 Championships
4th Brabantse Pijl
5th Road race, UCI World Under-23 Championships
5th Overall Tour of Britain
8th Grand Prix de Wallonie
8th Volta NXT Classic
10th Overall Arctic Race of Norway
2025
4th Overall Tour des Alpes-Maritimes

1st Points classification

==== Grand Tour general classification results timeline ====
Grand Tour	2025
Giro d'Italia	—
Tour de France	48
Vuelta a España	

Legend
—	Did not compete
DNF	Did not finish
