= Davide Toneatti =

Italian cyclist (born 2001)

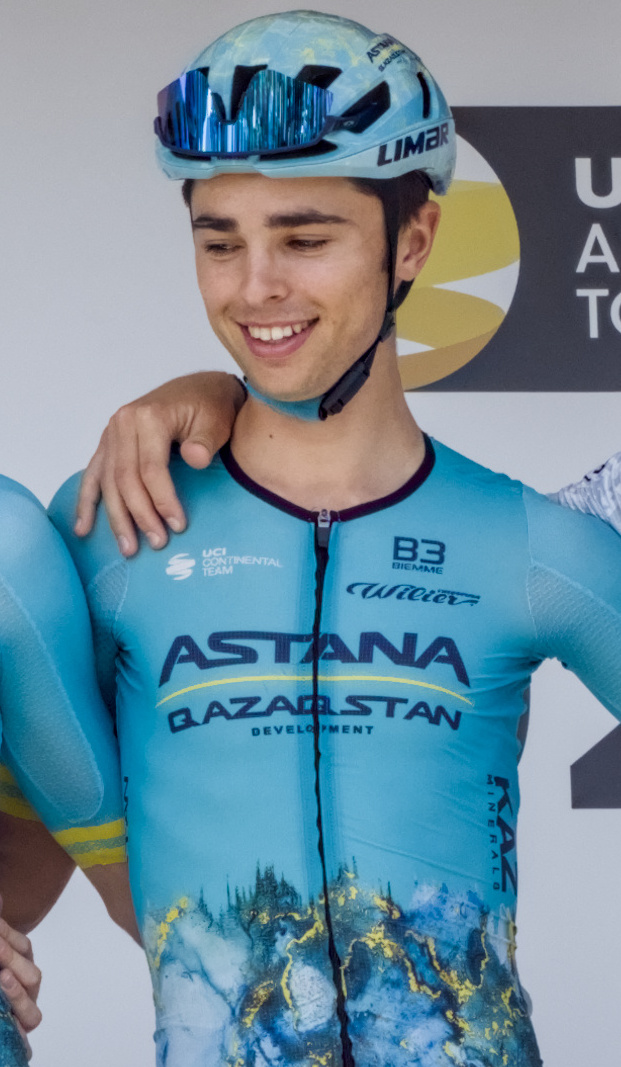
- Toneatti in 2024

Personal information
- Born: 9 April 2001 (age 25) Tolmezzo, Italy
- Height: 1.80 m (5 ft 11 in)
- Weight: 65 kg (143 lb)

Cycling career
- Sport: Cycling
- Current team: XDS Astana Team
- Disciplines: Road; Cyclo-cross; Mountain biking
- Role: Rider

Amateur teams
- 2020–2021: Team Rudy Project (MTB)
- 2020–2022: Team DP66–Giant (cyclo-cross)

Professional teams
- 2022–2024: Astana Qazaqstan Development Team
- 2025–: XDS Astana Team

Davide Toneatti (born 9 April 2001) is an Italian road and cyclo-cross cyclist, who currently rides for UCI WorldTeam XDS Astana Team.

== Major results ==
=== Road ===
2022
3rd Overall Giro della Regione Friuli Venezia Giulia
8th Trofeo Città di Meldola
9th Coppa della Pace
2024
2nd Overall Belgrade–Banja Luka

1st Stage 2

2nd Overall Tour of Romania
4th Overall International Tour of Rhodes
6th Overall Giro della Regione Friuli Venezia Giulia
9th Overall Visit South Aegean Islands
9th Cupa Max Ausnit
9th Giro del Veneto
2025
7th Muscat Classic

=== Cyclo-cross ===
2017–2018
1st Trofeo di Gorizia
2nd Gran Premio Città di Vittorio Veneto
3rd National Junior Championships
3rd Ciclocross del Ponte
2018–2019
1st International Ciclocross Selle SMP
1st Ciclocross del Ponte
1st Trofeo di Gorizia
1st Gran Premio Città di Vittorio Veneto
2019–2020
2nd National Under-23 Championships
2020–2021
3rd National Under-23 Championships
2021–2022
1st National Under-23 Championships
1st International Cyclocross Increa Brugherio
1st Internazionale CX San Colombano
2nd Gran Premio Internazionale CX Città di Jesolo
2022–2023
1st Trofeo Città di Firenze
1st Turin International Cyclocross
2nd National Championships
