= Florian Kajamini =

Italian cyclist (born 2003)

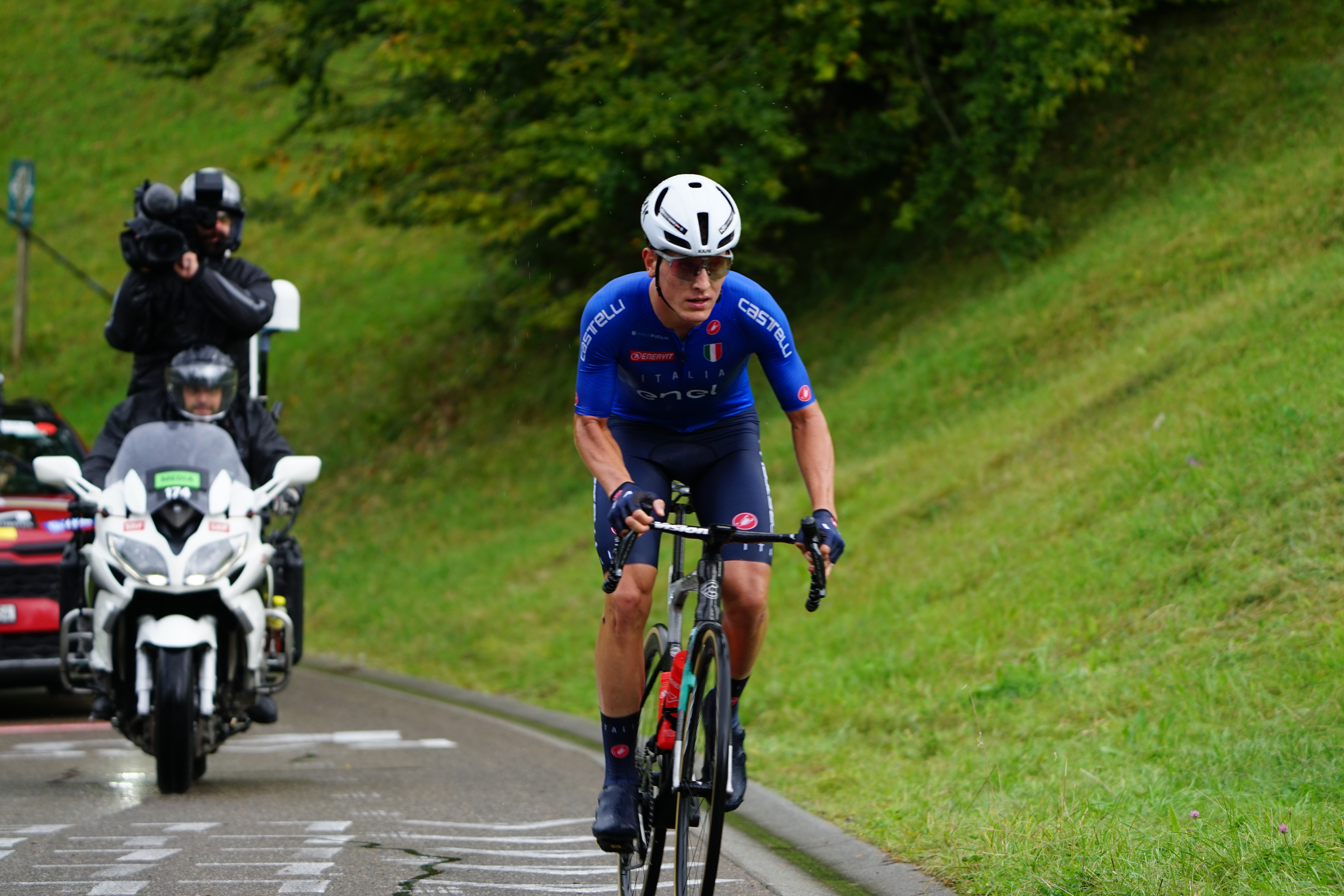
- Florian Kajamini during the 2024 World Championships

Personal information
- Full name: Florian Samuel Kajamini
- Born: 28 February 2003 (age 23) Bologna, Italy

Cycling career
- Sport: Cycling
- Current team: XDS Astana Team
- Discipline: Road
- Role: Rider
- Rider type: Climber

Amateur team
- 2020–2021: Italia Nuova Borgo Panigale

Professional teams
- 2022–2024: Team Colpack–Ballan
- 2025–: XDS Astana Team

Florian Samuel Kajamini (born 28 February 2003) is an Italian road and track cyclist, who currently rides for UCI WorldTeam XDS Astana Team.

== Major results ==
2021
8th Trofeo Guido Dorigo
2023
3rd Ruota d'Oro
9th Coppa Città di San Daniele
2024
1st Trofeo Città di San Vendemiano
1st Giro della Provincia di Biella
4th Gran Premio Sportivi di Poggiana
4th Trofeo Piva
5th Overall Tour de l'Avenir

1st Stage 5

5th G.P. Palio del Recioto
7th Overall Giro Next Gen
