= Harold Martín López =

Ecuadorian cyclist

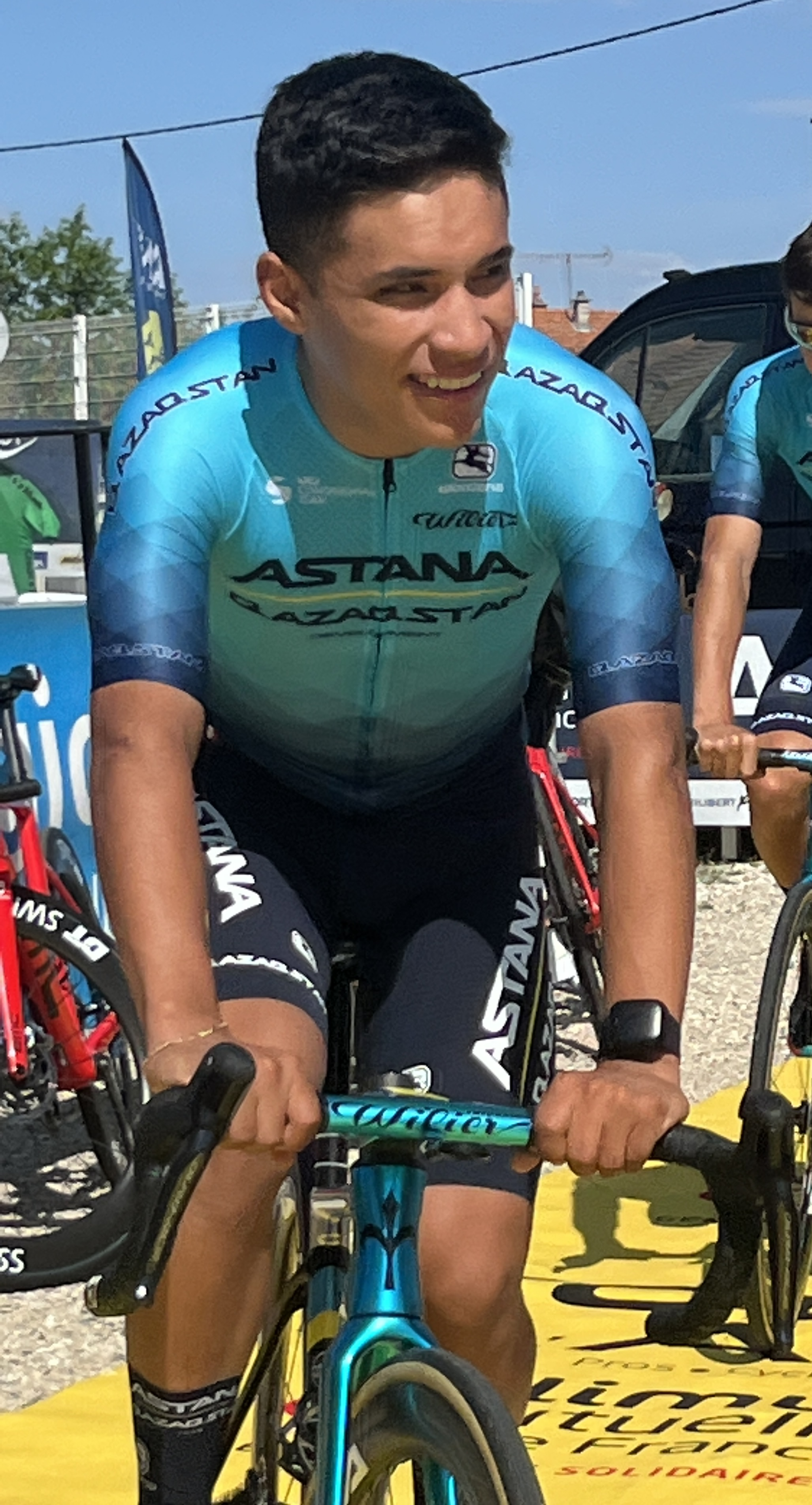
- Martín López in 2023

Personal information
- Full name: Harold Martín López Granizo
- Born: 3 December 2000 (age 25) Ibarra, Ecuador
- Height: 1.6 m (5 ft 3 in)
- Weight: 55 kg (121 lb)

Cycling career
- Sport: Cycling
- Current team: XDS Astana Team
- Discipline: Road
- Role: Rider
- Rider type: Climber

Professional teams
- 2019: Movistar Team Ecuador
- 2020–2021: Best PC Ecuador
- 2022–2023: Astana Qazaqstan Development Team
- 2024–: Astana Qazaqstan Team

Major wins
- Stage races Tour de Hongrie (2025)
Medal record
Men's road cycling
Representing Ecuador
Junior Pan American Games
Silver medal – second place	2021 Cali-Valle	Road race

Harold Martín López Granizo (born 3 December 2000) is an Ecuadorian road cyclist, who currently rides for UCI WorldTeam XDS Astana Team.

== Major results ==
2019
1st Stage 7 Vuelta a Costa Rica
2020
3rd Overall Vuelta al Ecuador
8th Overall Vuelta a Guatemala

1st Stages 6 & 8

2021
National Under-23 Road Championships

1st Time trial
2nd Road race

2nd Road race, Junior Pan American Games
2022
9th Strade Bianche di Romagna
2023
9th Overall Vuelta a Burgos
10th Overall Tour de Langkawi
2024
5th Overall Tour of Turkey
10th Overall Tour de Langkawi
2025 (4 pro wins)
1st Overall Tour de Hongrie

1st Stage 3

1st Overall International Tour of Hellas
2nd Overall Tour of Turkey

1st Stage 6

9th Milano–Torino
