= Darren van Bekkum =

Dutch cyclist

Personal information
- Born: 20 March 2002 (age 24) Amersfoort, Netherlands
- Height: 1.76 m (5 ft 9 in)
- Weight: 62 kg (137 lb)

Cycling career
- Sport: Cycling
- Current team: XDS Astana Team
- Discipline: Road
- Role: Rider
- Rider type: Climber

Professional teams
- 2021–2024: Jumbo–Visma Development Team
- 2025–: XDS Astana Team

Darren van Bekkum (born 20 March 2002) is a Dutch professional racing cyclist, who rides for UCI WorldTeam XDS Astana Team.

In March 2024, he finished second in the Istrian Spring Trophy. Initially the winner, he lost the race due to an unauthorized refueling, which cost him a time penalty. Two months later, he won the Ronde de l'Isard, after winning stage four atop the Plateau de Beille.

== Major results ==
2022
1st Stage 2 (TTT) Ronde de l'Isard
2023
3rd Overall Istrian Spring Trophy
3rd Umag Trophy
3rd Coppa Città di San Daniele
10th Overall Tour Alsace
2024
1st Overall Ronde de l'Isard

1st Mountains classification
1st Stage 4

2nd Overall Istrian Spring Trophy

1st Mountains classification

6th Overall Course de la Paix U23 – Grand Prix Jeseníky
2026
10th Overall Giro di Sardegna
