= XDS Astana Team =

Kazakh cycling team

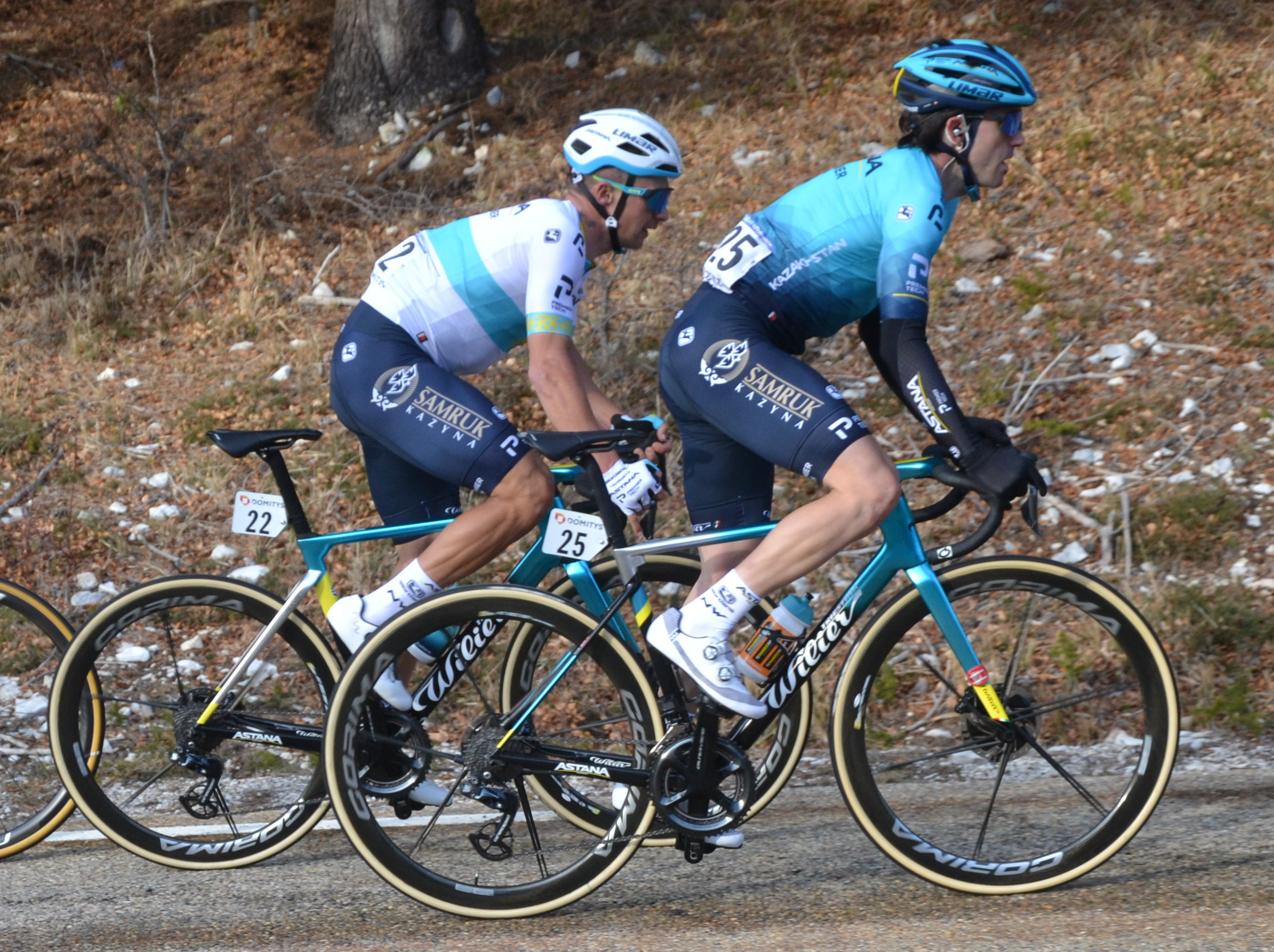
- Alexey Lutsenko and Ion Izagirre at the 2021 Tour de la Provence

Team information
- UCI code: XAT
- Registered: Switzerland (2007); Luxembourg (2008); Kazakhstan (2009–present)
- Founded: 2007
- Discipline: Road
- Status: UCI WorldTeam
- Bicycles: BMC (2007); Trek (2008–2009); Specialized (2010–2016); Argon 18 (2017–2019); Wilier Triestina (2020–2024); X-Lab (2025–)
- Components: Shimano/FSA
- Website: Team home page

Key personnel
- General manager: Alexander Vinokourov
- Team managers: Serguei Yakovlev; Gorazd Štangelj; Stefano Zanini; Dmitriy Sedoun; Dmitriy Fofonov; Alexandr Shefer

Team name history
2007–2020	Astana Pro Team
2021	Astana–Premier Tech
2022–2024	Astana Qazaqstan Team
2025–	XDS Astana Team

XDS Astana Team (UCI team code: XAT) is a professional road bicycle racing team sponsored by the Samruk-Kazyna, a coalition of state-owned companies from Kazakhstan and named after its capital city Astana. Astana attained UCI ProTeam status in its inaugural year, 2007. Following a major doping scandal involving Kazakh rider Alexander Vinokourov, team management was terminated and new management brought in for the 2008 season. The team was then managed by Johan Bruyneel, former team manager of U.S. Postal/Discovery Channel team. Under Bruyneel the ethical nature of the team did not improve, although Astana in this period was very successful.

With a lineup including Grand Tour winner Alberto Contador, as well as runner-up Andreas Klöden the results were good, but the team was on the verge of financial collapse in May 2009. A battle for control of the team led to the return of Vinokourov for the 2009 Vuelta a España and caused Bruyneel and at least fourteen of its riders to leave at the end of the 2009 season, most for Team RadioShack. Only four Spanish riders, including Contador, and most of the Kazakhs remained with the rebuilt team for 2010. Those four Spaniards all left the team for Saxo Bank–SunGard in 2011.

== History ==
=== Demise of Liberty Seguros–Würth ===
Astana first became involved in sponsoring cycling during the 2006 season. The Spanish Liberty Seguros–Würth team was heavily implicated in the Operación Puerto doping case and the sponsors Liberty Mutual, and later Würth, withdrew their sponsorship of the team. Astana stepped in to sponsor the team, and during the second half of the season, Vinokourov won the Vuelta a España while riding for the renamed Team Astana, and his Kazakh teammate Andrey Kashechkin finished third.

=== 2007: Formation of the new team ===
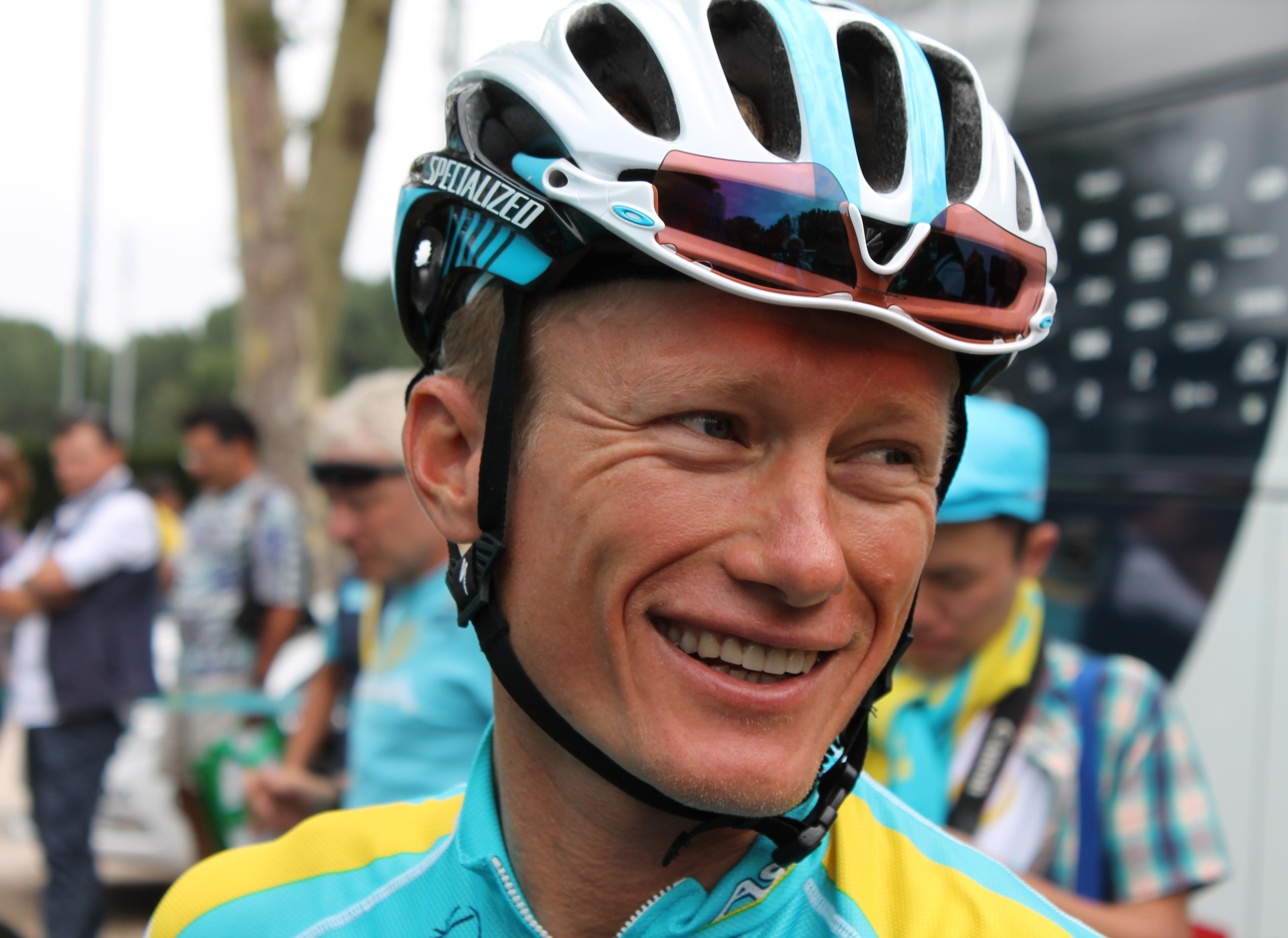
Alexander Vinokourov – Vuelta-2006 winner

The new Astana management initially tried to buy the ProTour licence of the former Liberty Seguros–Würth team, held by Manolo Saiz. However, Saiz was reluctant to sell, so Astana applied for a licence in their own right. Initially, the new team was based in Switzerland under the holding company of Zeus Sarl and managed by former Tour de Suisse organiser Marc Biver. Vinokourov was the team's debut leader.

The UCI ProTour license commission first informed Astana that they would not be granted a ProTour License for the 2007 season. Following UCI's decision not to grant a ProTour license, the organizers of the three Grand Tours informed Astana Team that they would be included, regardless of ProTour license status. On 20 December 2006 the UCI License Commission relented and awarded Astana Team a 4-year ProTour license.

Other prominent new riders for the 2007 season included stage race specialists Andreas Klöden, Paolo Savoldelli and Andrey Kashechkin, as well as Matthias Kessler, Grégory Rast, Thomas Frei and Spanish climber Antonio Colom.

=== 2008 ===
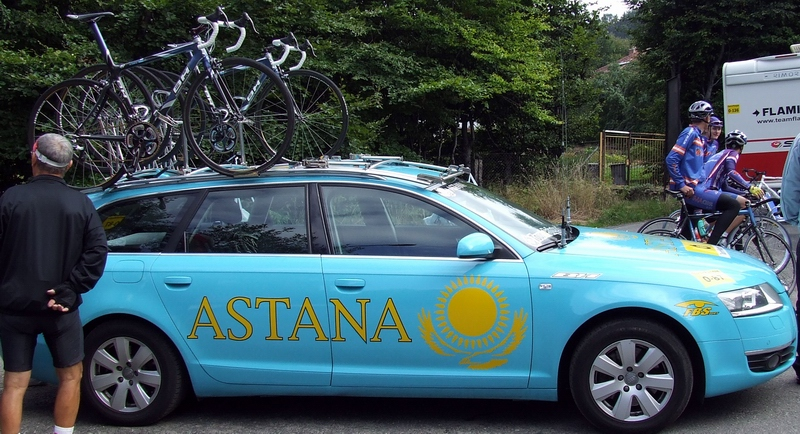
2008 team car

Riding under a Luxembourgian license, the team also included other ex-Discovery Channel riders such as Tomas Vaitkus, Sérgio Paulinho, Chechu Rubiera, Vladimir Gusev and Janez Brajkovič, as well as American Chris Horner.

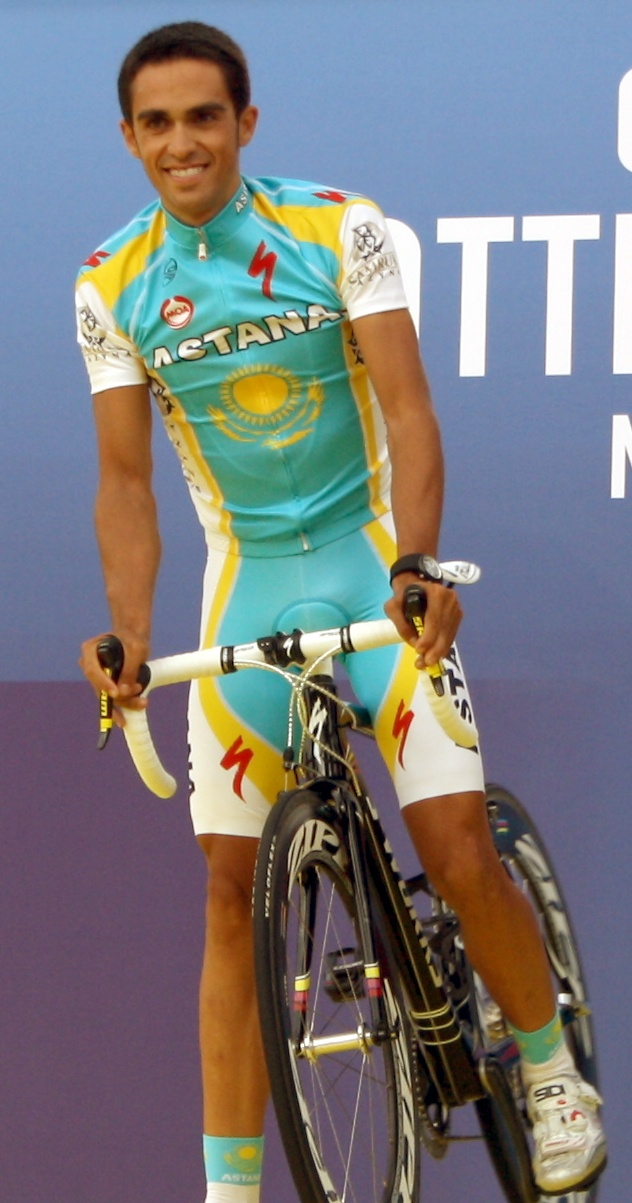
Alberto Contador

The Astana team was not invited to the 2008 Giro d'Italia based on failing to meet the criteria of ethics, quality, or internationality. However, on 3 May, one week before the start of the race, Giro organizers chose to extend a last-minute invitation to Astana. Astana was able to field a team despite the short notice, and on 1 June, Alberto Contador won the Giro, finishing 11th on the final stage time trial to keep his pink jersey and take the overall victory.

Contador also won the 2008 Vuelta a España, with teammate Levi Leipheimer finishing a close second. Thus, despite not competing in the Tour de France due to doping by Vinokourov and others in 2007, Astana still won two Grand Tours in 2008 and achieved three podiums. Leipheimer also won a bronze medal in the time trial in the 2008 Olympics, just edging Contador, who finished fourth.

Among the other results achieved by the team were victories in several stage races: by Contador in the Vuelta al País Vasco and the Vuelta a Castilla y León, by Leipheimer in the Tour of California, by Klöden in the Tour de Romandie and by Russian Sergei Ivanov in the Tour de Wallonie. Various team members also achieved several other top-tier results, and Ivanov, Paulinho, Vaikus and two of the Kazakhs won their national championships.

Astana's strict anti-doping policy came to the forefront later in the year. On 28 July Astana fired Vladimir Gusev for showing "abnormal values" in an internal doping check. In a statement, Bruyneel said that while the results "do not indicate the use of banned substances, the team has therefore applied the contractual terms based on these physiological and biological abnormalities", and fired Gusev "with immediate effect." On 17 June 2009, almost a year later, the Court of Arbitration in Sport ruled that Bruyneel's company, Olympus sarl, which held the rider contracts, had violated Swiss employment contract law by firing Gusev on the suspicion of doping without prior implementation of the special procedure provided under terms of the contract. The company was ordered to pay Gusev back wages, damages and legal costs.

=== 2009: The return of Lance Armstrong ===
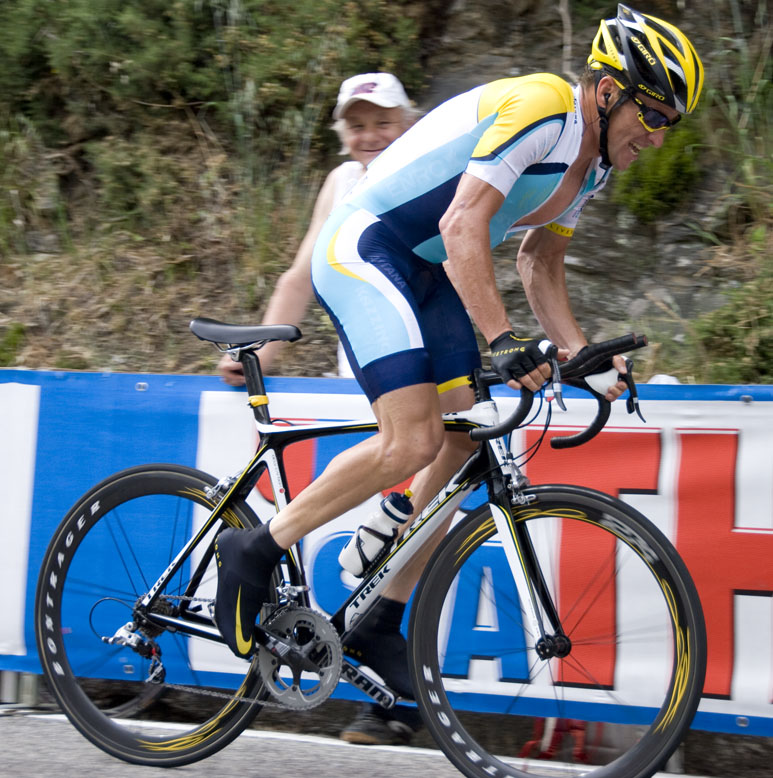
Lance Armstrong at the 2009 Giro d'Italia

On 25 September 2008, it was confirmed that Lance Armstrong – at the time considered a seven-time Tour de France winner – would leave retirement to ride for the team in the 2009 season. Along with Armstrong, Yaroslav Popovych, another former Discovery Channel rider, joined the ranks of Astana, which brought the number of former Discovery Channel riders on Astana to nine (Armstrong, Popovych, Contador, Leipheimer, Rubiera, Noval, Vaitkus, Paulinho and Brajkovič).

It was reported that Armstrong would share team leadership with current leader Contador, that he intended to participate in the Tour Down Under, the Tour of California, Paris–Nice, the Tour de Georgia, the Critérium du Dauphiné Liberé and the Tour de France, and that he would receive no salary or bonuses, instead directing his attention to raising awareness for cancer research.

Along with Armstrong and Popovych, Astana also signed Jesús Hernández, who had joined the former Liberty Seguros team in 2004 when Alberto Contador was one of the riders there, and Basque rider Haimar Zubeldia. Contador expressed his support for the return of Vinokourov from his two-year doping suspension but seemed less enthusiastic about Armstrong's return.

Armstrong was part of the team that participated in the season's first ProTour race, the 2009 Tour Down Under. The team's first victory of the season was the 6th stage, followed by the general classification, of the Tour of California by Levi Leipheimer. In the same week, Alberto Contador won a stage and the classification of the Volta ao Algarve, and subsequently two stages in the Paris–Nice race.

Armstrong's participation in the Tour was cast into doubt in late March, after he suffered a broken collarbone in the Vuelta a Castilla y León that required surgical repair. However, Armstrong was able to recover in time to ride in the 2009 Giro d'Italia.

==== Financial crisis ====
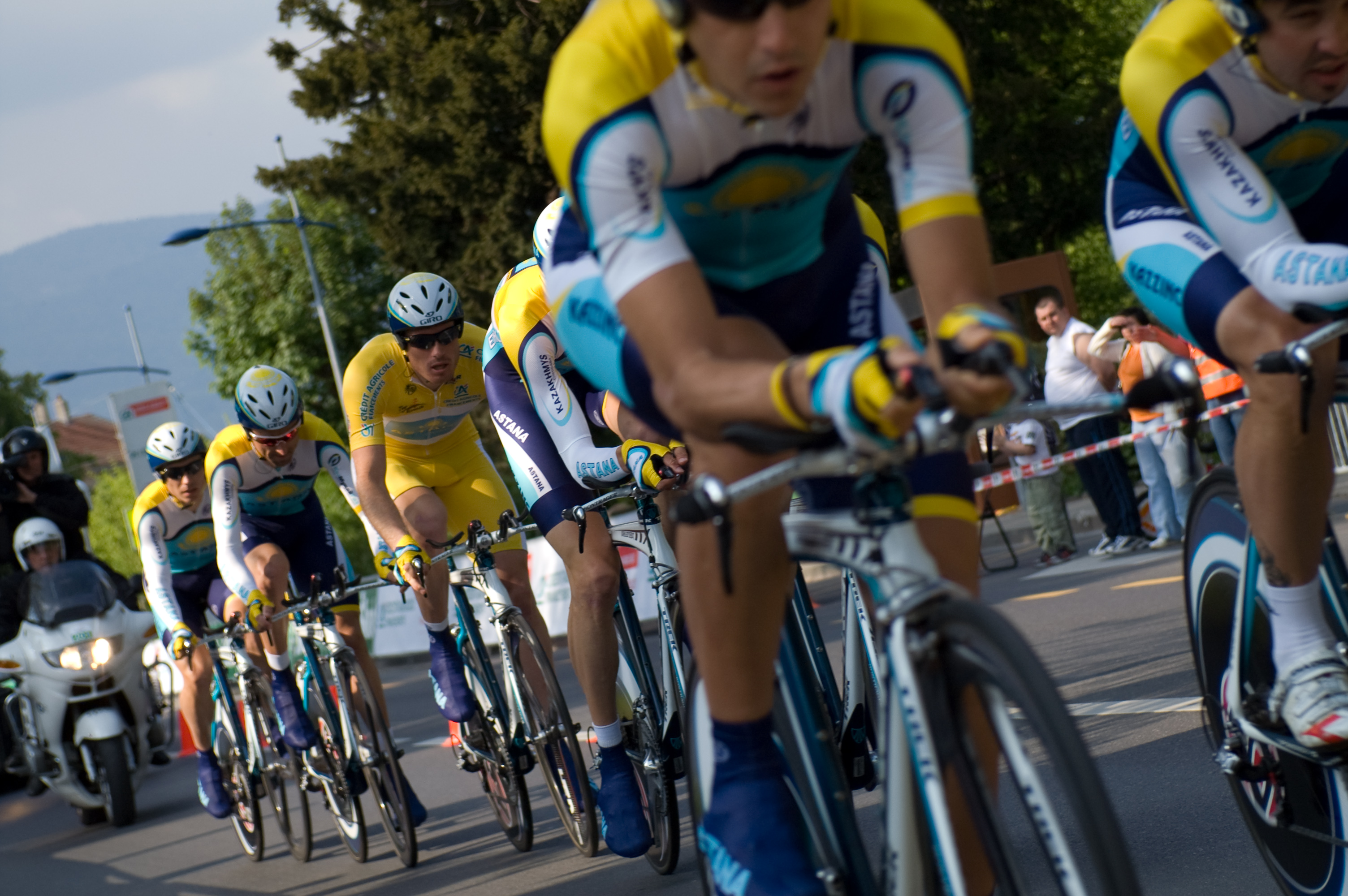
Team time trial at the 2009 Tour de Romandie

On 6 May 2009, Astana admitted that it had failed to pay its riders amid the financial crisis in Kazakhstan, but a team spokesman said that this was only a delay, that the team was not in danger of folding, and that the team would compete in the 2009 Giro d'Italia as planned. On 7 May Armstrong, riding for Astana on an unpaid basis, expressed his sympathy for employees waiting for their wages only days before the start of the Giro d'Italia. He also said that if the financial crisis was not resolved, the team's license should be turned over to Bruyneel, which he said was the "most logical solution."

Organizationally, Astana had an unusual structure. Although the Kazakh team holds the UCI license and pays the salaries, the individual rider contracts and equipment leases are held by Bruyneel's Luxembourg-based Olympus SARL, so the team could continue with merely a license transfer. UCI President Pat McQuaid was planning a visit to Astana during the Giro to discuss the team's future. According to Armstrong: "I don't have any concrete answers but I suspect we can find some funding that would get us from June to the end of the year." On 11 May, the UCI set a deadline for resolving Astana's financial situation of 31 May, the last day of the Giro. If the team had not met its financial obligations by that date, it would be suspended by the UCI. Bruyneel noted that at least the team would be able to finish the Giro under its current banner.

During stage 7 of the Giro, eight of the nine Astana riders, including Armstrong, rode in jerseys with the non-paying sponsors' names nearly faded out in protest over the team's unpaid salaries and remained in such jerseys for the rest of the Giro. The only rider not to participate was Andrey Zeits from Kazakhstan. According to Bruyneel, the names of paying sponsors, such as Trek and KazMunayGas, were not blanked out, and the team would continue to "race with these shirts until everything, emphasis on everything, is fixed", as "the riders have only received two months of salary in 2009." On 19 May, Bruyneel announced that the sponsors had paid part of the past-due wages since the start of the protest "but the major part is still missing." On 3 June the Astana team gave financial guarantees to cycling's governing body which would allow them to compete in the 2009 Tour de France in July, and later that month declared their financial problems to be resolved and the funds secure at least to the end of the season.

==== Vinokourov versus Bruyneel ====
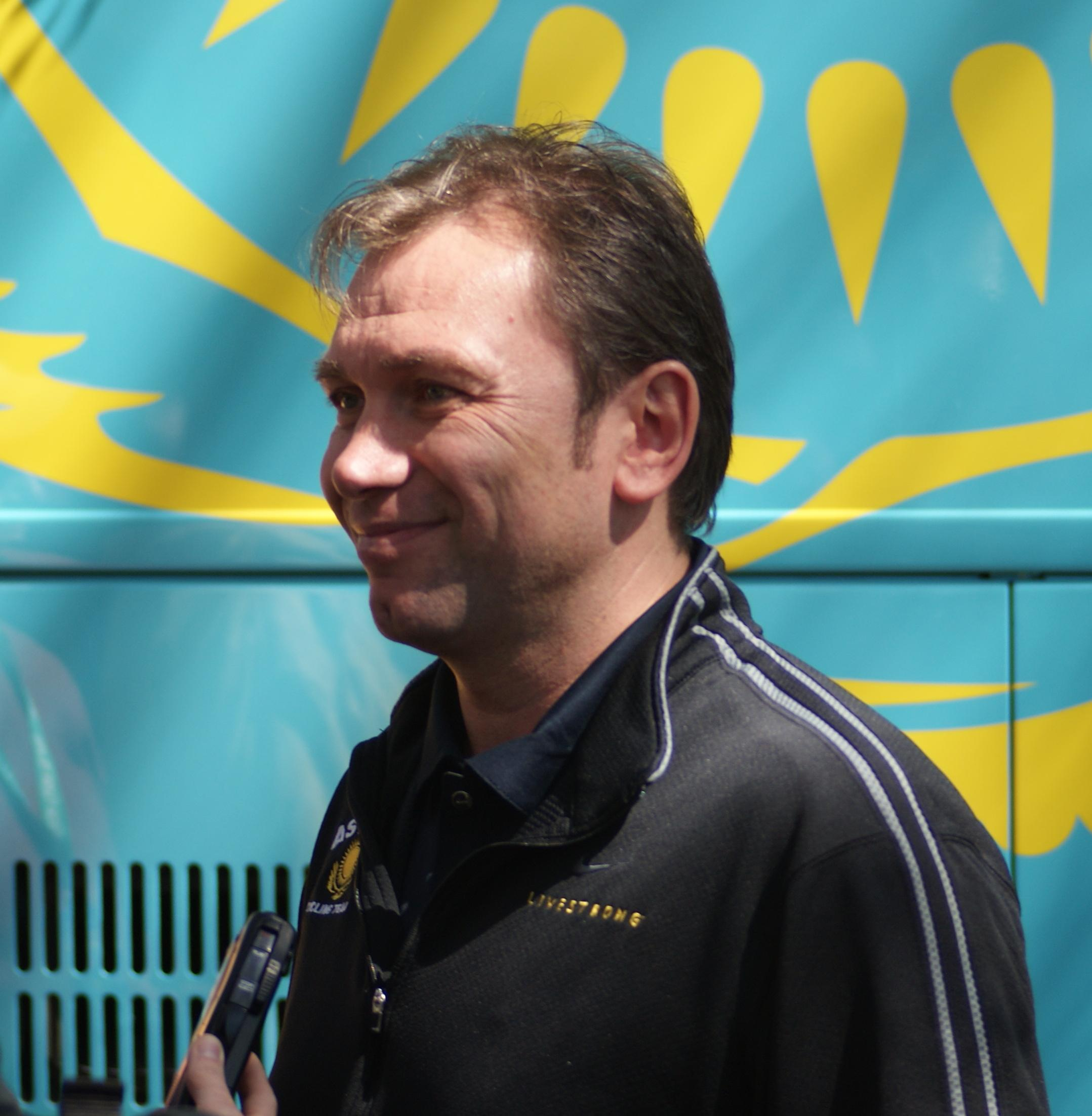
Johan Bruyneel as the director of the Team Astana, 2009

During these financial problems, it was rumored that three of the former Discovery Channel riders on the team – team leader Contador and his domestiques Benjamín Noval and Sérgio Paulinho would join Garmin–Slipstream for the Tour de France if Armstrong were to take over the Astana team. These problems seemed to be resolved, at least for the remainder of 2009, when the team's funding was resolved. However, the funding battle may have been merely a skirmish related to the underlying issue: control of the Astana team after the expiration of the two-year doping suspension of Alexander Vinokourov on 24 July 2009.

On 2 July, Vinokourov stated that he would return to Astana, which he noted was "created for me and thanks to my efforts", when his suspension ended, and that he would ride for Astana in the 2009 Vuelta a España. He stated that he expected to reach an agreement with Bruyneel about his return within the week, but that "if Bruyneel does not want me, it will be Bruyneel who is leaving the team."

The next day, the French newspaper L'Équipe reported that the Kazakh Cycling Federation planned to fire Bruyneel, Armstrong, Leipheimer and many of the other riders and rebuild the team in the model of the old Liberty Seguros team, which was predominantly Spanish. The paper quoted the vice-president of the Kazakh federation as saying, "[Contador] will be our sole leader for years to come [and] will be able to pick out the riders he wants to ride with him. In our mind, the team will be composed of Spanish and Kazakh riders, including Alexander Vinokourov."

On 21 July, with Contador, Armstrong and Klöden holding three of the top four places in the Tour de France, Bruyneel told Belgian channel VRT that Astana as currently constituted was "finished" and that he would be leaving the team, as Vinokourov and the Kazakh federation had discussed, at the end of the season. Despite the comments by Vinokourov and the Kazakhstan federation, Bruyneel and Vinokourov did not reach an agreement regarding Vinokourov's return to Astana for 2009, and the team submitted a preliminary roster to the 2009 Vuelta a España listing him only as a reserve. Finally, on 24 August, Astana announced that an agreement had been reached between Vinokourov and Bruyneel and that Vinokourov would rejoin the team for the start of the Vuelta. The next day, Armstrong announced that Bruyneel would take over Team RadioShack in 2010.

=== 2010 ===
The immediate result of Vinokourov's return and Bruyneel's departure was a mass exodus from Astana. Although Bruyneel still had a year to run on his contract, Astana permitted his departure in return for him not blocking Vinokourov's return. Contador had a year on his contract, and Astana refused to permit his departure. Much of the rest of the team departed for RadioShack, including Armstrong, Klöden, Leipheimer, Zubeldia, Horner, Brajkovič, Popovych, Paulinho, Vaitkus, Rast, Rubiera and Muravyev (the only Kazakh to depart), which meant that eight of the nine members of the winning Astana team at the 2009 Tour de France moved to RadioShack.

Schär and Morabito joined CCC Pro Team. All that remained of Astana was four Spanish riders (Contador, Noval, Navarro and Hernández) and the Kazakhs (except Muravyev). The team signed three more Spanish riders, including 2006 Tour champion Óscar Pereiro, to support Contador. Consistent with the July 2009 plan, the 2010 team included 12 Kazakhs and 7 Spaniards among its 26 riders.

=== 2013–2016: Nibali era ===
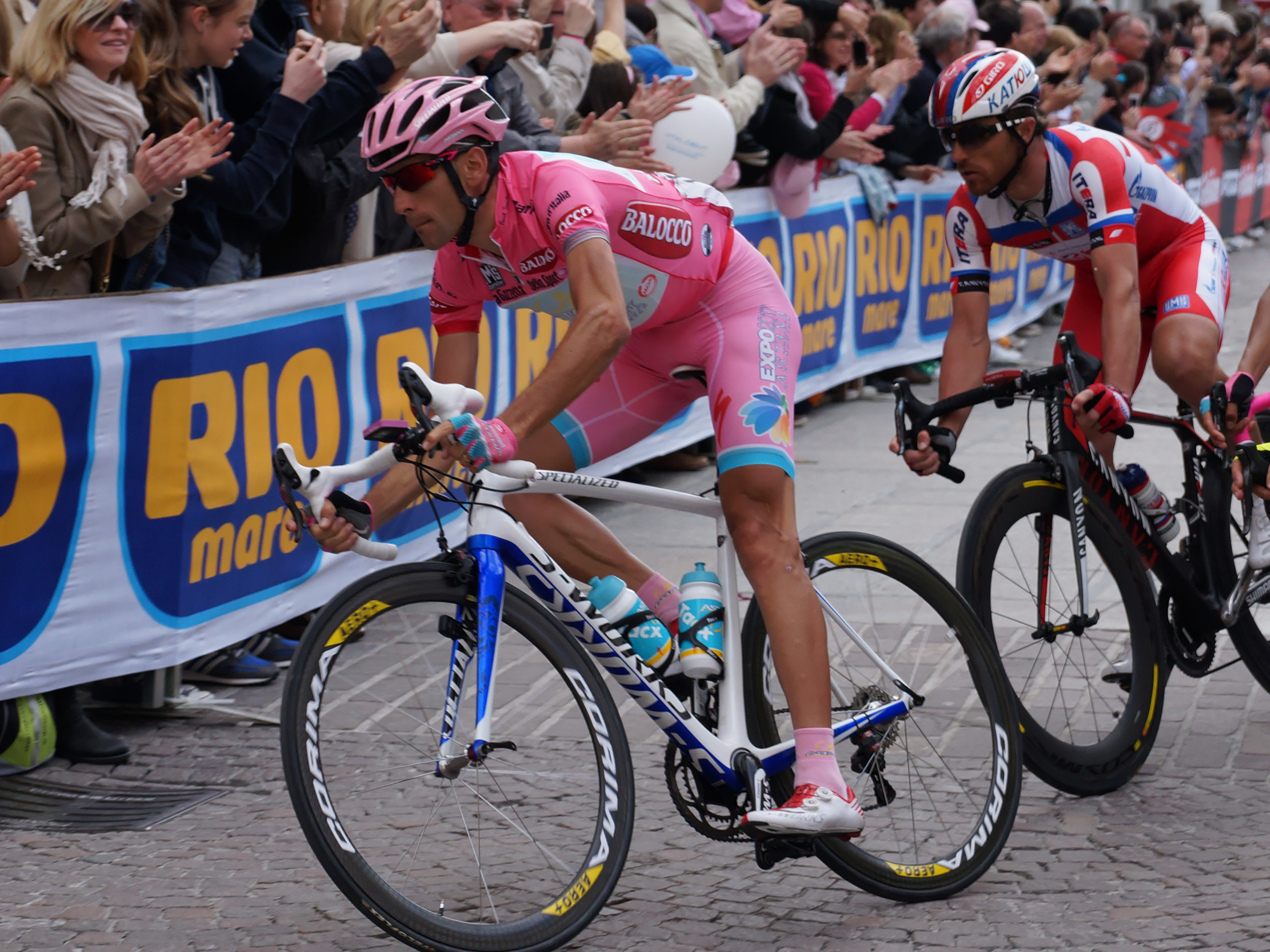
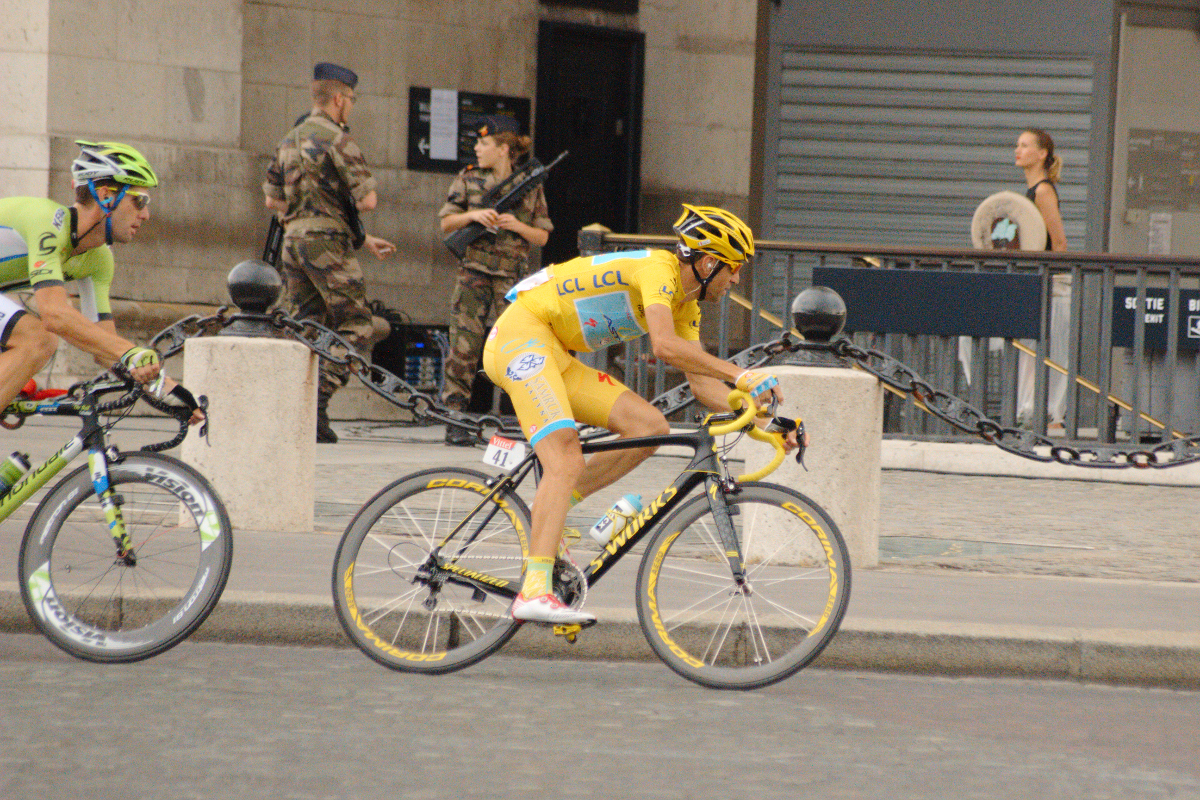
Vincenzo Nibali en route to winning the 2013 Giro d'Italia and 2014 Tour de France.

When Contador left the team after the 2010 season, the Spanish faction of the team declined, to be replaced by an Italian element; in 2011 and 2012, the team signed Enrico Gasparotto, Mirco Lorenzetto, Francesco Masciarelli, Jacopo Guarnieri, Francesco Gavazzi, Simone Ponzi, and Fabio Aru, while in the same period of time David de la Fuente, Daniel Navarro, Jesús Hernández, Benjamín Noval, Óscar Pereiro, and Josep Jufré resigned, so that by the beginning of the 2012 season there were no Spanish riders of the team.

In 2013, the team signed Valerio Agnoli, Andrea Guardini, Alessandro Vanotti, and Vincenzo Nibali, who immediately won Tirreno–Adriatico and the Giro d'Italia. Then Nibali wore the leader's jersey more than any other Italian in the history of the Vuelta (13 stages out of 21), but lost first place to American Chris Horner (RadioShack-Nissan). In 2014, Vincenzo Nibali won the Tour de France and became the sixth cyclist who have won the three Grand Tours. In August the team announced they had signed Lars Boom (Belkin Pro Cycling), Luis León Sánchez (Caja Rural–Seguros RGA), Davide Malacarne (Team Europcar) & Diego Rosa (Androni Giocattoli–Venezuela) for the 2015 season.

On August 20, the team announced the signing of Rein Taaramäe (Cofidis) on a one-year deal. With the addition of Michele Scarponi in 2014 and Dario Cataldo in 2015, the team had a plurality Italian element at the beginning of the 2015 season, with 9 riders out of 25 and only 5 Kazakh riders remaining.

=== Doping controversies ===
The team recorded its first doping positive in April 2007, when Matthias Kessler tested positive for testosterone following a surprise control in Charleroi and later analysis of his B-sample.Eddy Mazzoleni left the team later in July after allegations of doping usage. Mazzoleni, who had finished 3rd in the 2007 Giro d'Italia, was later suspended for two years for his alleged involvement in the Oil for Drugs doping case. On the eve of the 2007 Tour de France, Alexander Vinokourov confirmed he had received coaching from controversial doctor Michele Ferrari.

The next positive doping result came from team-leader Vinokourov, after a positive result for blood doping (blood transfusion). As a result, ASO (the organisers of the Tour de France) "invited" Team Astana's management to withdraw the entire team from the Tour de France; this invitation was immediately accepted. Following confirmation that Vinokourov's B-sample had also tested positive, the Astana Team announced that he had been sacked with immediate effect.

On 1 August 2007, fellow Kazakh Andrey Kashechkin tested positive for homologous blood doping following an out-of-competition test in Belek, Turkey. He was suspended and subsequently fired. This was followed by the termination of José Antonio Redondo's contract after "failing to abide by team rules", making him the fifth rider of the team to leave during the 2007 season.

Following the doping problems of 2007, Astana's sponsors replaced Biver with Johan Bruyneel, the former directeur sportif of the defunct Discovery Channel Pro Cycling Team. Bruyneel had the mandate to start afresh with the team, so he hired a number of former Discovery riders including 2007 Tour de France winner Alberto Contador (who had ridden with Vinokourov on the old Liberty Seguros team) and third-place finisher Levi Leipheimer. Bruyneel introduced the anti-doping system developed by Dr. Rasmus Damsgaard, Head of Information for Anti Doping Danmark (ADD). The anti-doping system was initially used by Team CSC starting in 2007. The link between the Discovery Channel team and Astana was strengthened when Bruyneel signed a contract with Trek Bicycle Corporation to supply the team with bicycles and components, as they had done with Discovery Channel. Bruyneel also affirmed sponsorship with component maker SRAM.

On 13 February 2008, the organisers of both the Giro d'Italia and Tour de France announced that Astana would be barred from their 2008 Grand Tours, due to the team's links to Operación Puerto and involvement in the 2007 Tour doping scandals. This meant that Contador was unable to defend his Tour crown, because his contract did not have an "escape clause" that covered Astana's current situation. One week before the 2008 Giro d'Italia, the organisers went on to invite the team to the race, a race which Alberto Contador went on to win. In July, Vladimir Gusev was sacked by the team due to "irregular values" highlighted by the team's new internal anti-doping system.

In 2009, after returning from retirement, Lance Armstrong was accused by the French anti-doping agency of acting improperly by disappearing from the sight of the anti-doping investigator for 20 minutes. In June, Assan Bazayev was given a two-week internal suspension for not correctly reporting his whereabouts properly.

In September 2010, Alberto Contador returned a positive doping test for Clenbuterol at the 2010 Tour de France. After a two-year legal procedure, Contador is stripped of his 2010 Tour de France win (and 2011 Giro d'Italia victory).

In 2011, Roman Kreuziger finished 5th at the Giro d'Italia as well as winning the best young rider classification. In 2014, the UCI began proceedings against him for biological passport anomalies dated from 2011 and 2012 – the two years he spent at Astana.

In 2012, former Astana riders and staff including; Lance Armstrong, Johan Bruyneel, Levi Leipheimer, Dr. Pedro Celaya and Dr. Luis del Moral are heavily implicated in the mass doping scandal which surrounded the U.S. Postal /Discovery Channel team.

In September 2014, it emerged that Valentin Iglinskiy has returned a positive test for EPO at the Eneco Tour, he confessed to doping to the team and was immediately sacked, three weeks later Valentin's brother, Maxim Iglinskiy was provisionally suspended by the UCI for an EPO-positive on August 1. It was later announced that Astana withdrew themselves from the Tour of Beijing per the MPCC rules, who state that a team with 2 positives in a short period of time must not participate in the next World Tour event.

Subsequently, a sample taken at the Tour de l'Avenir in August from Ilya Davidenok, a rider with the Astana Continental Team and a stagiaire with the Astana Pro Team, tested positive for anabolic steroids. Davidenok was provisionally suspended, and a review into the team's licence was announced following the positive tests for Davidenok and the Iglinskiy brothers.

=== University of Lausanne independent audit ===
On February 27, 2015, cycling's governing body, the UCI, requested that the team's WorldTour licence be withdrawn following an audit of its doping controls by the Institute of Sport Sciences in Lausanne. The UCI stated that the audit revealed a large difference between the team policies presented to the Licence Commission and reality. On 23 April 2015, it was finally announced by the UCI that Astana would keep their license but would be under more scrutiny.

=== Since 2021 ===
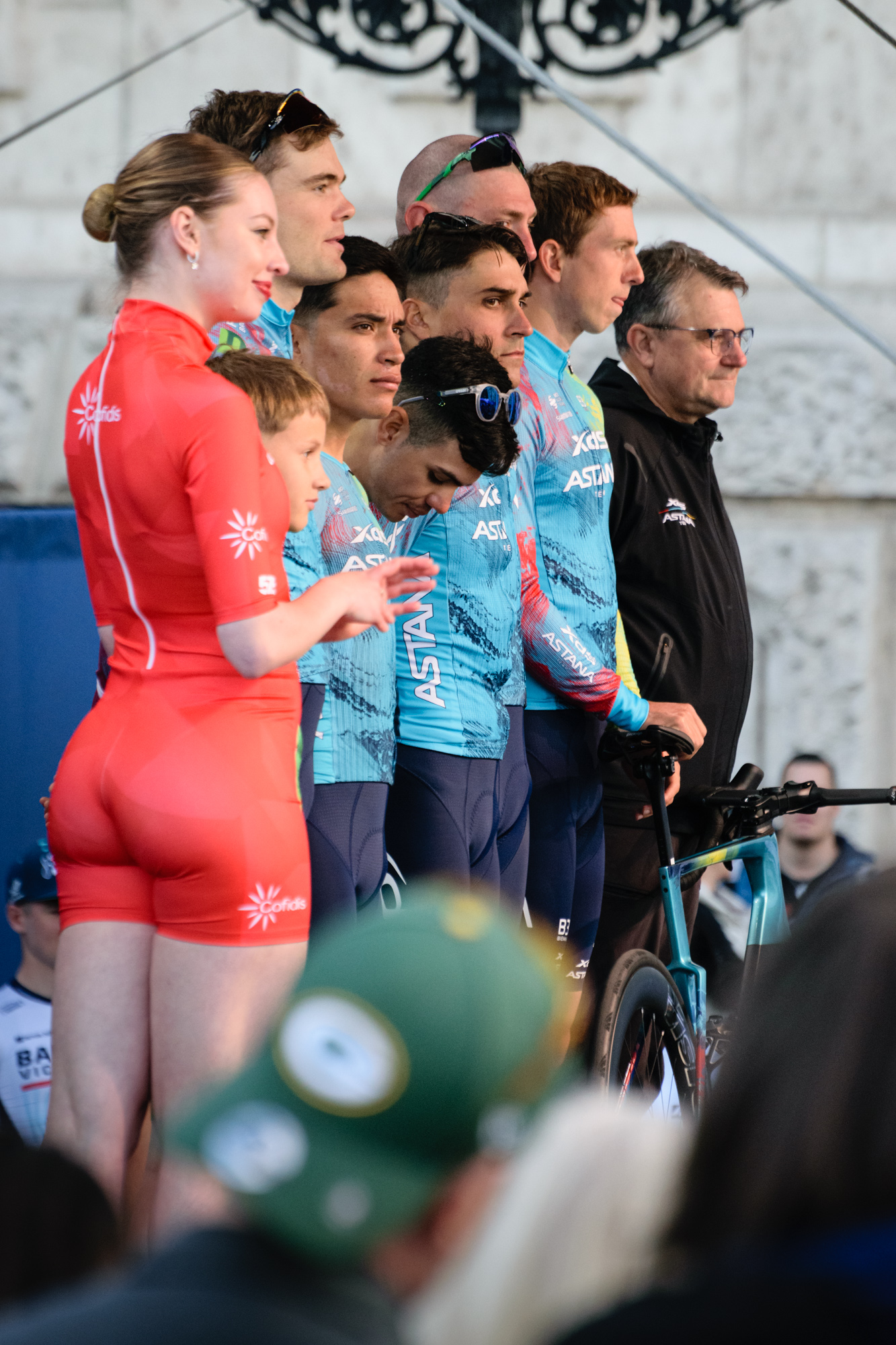
The team at the 2025 Tour de Hongrie

For the first time in its history, the team took on a co-title sponsor, as Canadian tech company Premier Tech joined for the 2021 season. However, mid-season disagreements between it and the team's Kazakh shareholders resulted in the collaboration being cut short after one season, and the team rebranded to better demonstrate its Kazakh background.

== Team roster ==
As of 11 March 2026.

Rider	Date of birth
Davide Ballerini (ITA)	21 September 1994 (age 31)
Alberto Bettiol (ITA)	29 October 1993 (age 32)
Clément Champoussin (FRA)	29 May 1998 (age 28)
Nicola Conci (ITA)	5 January 1997 (age 29)
Yevgeniy Fedorov (KAZ)	16 February 2000 (age 26)
Lorenzo Fortunato (ITA)	9 May 1996 (age 30)
Aaron Gate (NZL)	26 November 1990 (age 35)
Lev Gonov (RUS)	6 January 2000 (age 26)
Sergio Higuita (COL)	1 August 1997 (age 29)
Florian Samuel Kajamini (ITA)	28 February 2003 (age 23)
Max Kanter (GER)	22 October 1997 (age 28)
Anton Kuzmin (KAZ)	20 November 1996 (age 29)
Arjen Livyns (BEL)	1 September 1994 (age 32)
Harold Martín López (ECU)	3 December 2000 (age 25)
Matteo Malucelli (ITA)	20 October 1993 (age 32)

Rider	Date of birth
Henok Mulubrhan (ERI)	11 November 1999 (age 26)
Cristián Rodríguez (ESP)	3 March 1995 (age 31)
Alessandro Romele (ITA)	30 August 2003 (age 23)
Christian Scaroni (ITA)	16 October 1997 (age 28)
Marco Schrettl (AUT)	11 September 2003 (age 22)
Thomas Silva (URY)	30 December 2001 (age 24)
Su Haoyu (CHN)	26 October 2000 (age 25)
Gleb Syritsa (RUS)	14 April 2000 (age 26)
Harold Tejada (COL)	27 April 1997 (age 29)
Mike Teunissen (NED)	25 August 1992 (age 34)
Davide Toneatti (ITA)	9 April 2001 (age 25)
Diego Ulissi (ITA)	15 July 1989 (age 37)
Darren van Bekkum (NED)	20 March 2002 (age 24)
Simone Velasco (ITA)	2 December 1995 (age 30)
Nicolas Vinokurov (KAZ)	7 July 2002 (age 24)

== National and continental champions ==
2007
Kazakhstan Road Race Maxim Iglinsky
Luxembourg Road Race Benoît Joachim
2008
Kazakhstan Road Race Assan Bazayev
Kazakhstan Time Trial Andrey Mizurov
Russia Road Race Serguei Ivanov
Russia Time Trial Vladimir Gusev
Lithuania Road Race Tomas Vaitkus
Portugal Time Trial Sérgio Paulinho
2009
Slovenia Time Trial Janez Brajkovič
Spain Time Trial Alberto Contador
2010
Slovenia Road Race Gorazd Štangelj
Kazakhstan Road Race Maxim Gourov
2011
Kazakhstan Road Race Andrey Mizurov
2012
Kazakhstan Road Race Assan Bazayev
Kazakhstan Time Trial Dmitriy Gruzdev
Slovenia Road Race Borut Božič
Ukraine Road Race Andriy Hryvko
Ukraine Time Trial Andriy Hryvko
Estonia Road Race Tanel Kangert
2013
Estonia Time Trial Tanel Kangert
Kazakhstan Road Race Alexsandr Dyachenko
Ukraine Time Trial Andriy Hryvko
2014
Kazakhstan Time Trial Daniil Fominykh
Italy Road Race Vincenzo Nibali
2015
Kazakhstan Time Trial Alexey Lutsenko
Italy Road Race Vincenzo Nibali
2016
Latvia Time Trial Gatis Smukulis
Kazakhstan Time Trial Dmitriy Gruzdev
Latvia Road Race Gatis Smukulis
Kazakhstan Road Race Arman Kamyshev
2017
Kazakhstan Time Trial Zhandos Bizhigitov
Kazakhstan Road Race Artyom Zakharov
Italy Road Race Fabio Aru
2018
Ukraine Time Trial Andriy Hryvko
Estonia Time Trial Tanel Kangert
Kazakhstan Time Trial Daniil Fominykh
Kazakhstan Road Race Alexey Lutsenko
2019
Kazakhstan Time Trial Alexey Lutsenko
Kazakhstan Road Race Alexey Lutsenko
2020
Spain Road Race Luis León Sánchez
Kazakhstan Track (Omnium), Artyom Zakharov
Kazakhstan Track (Madison), Artyom Zakharov
Kazakhstan Track (Scratch race), Artyom Zakharov
2021
Russia Time Trial Aleksandr Vlasov
Spain Time Trial Ion Izagirre
Spain Road Race Omar Fraile
Italy Time Trial Matteo Sobrero
Kazakhstan Road Race Yevgeniy Fedorov
Eritrea Time Trial Merhawi Kudus
Canada Time Trial Hugo Houle
2022
Kazakhstan Time Trial Yuriy Natarov
Kazakhstan Road Race Yevgeniy Gidich
Asia U23 Road Race Gleb Brussenskiy
2023
Asia Time Trial Yevgeniy Fedorov
Asia Road Race Gleb Brussenskiy
Kazakhstan Time Trial Alexey Lutsenko
Italy Road Race Simone Velasco
Kazakhstan Road Race Alexey Lutsenko
2024
Asia Time Trial Yevgeniy Fedorov
Asia U23 Time Trial Nicolas Vinokurov
Kazakhstan Time Trial Dmitriy Gruzdev
Kazakhstan Road Race Dmitriy Gruzdev
Africa Road Race Henok Mulubrhan
2025
Asia Time Trial Yevgeniy Fedorov

== See also ==
- List of rosters for Astana Pro Team and its successors
