= List of Astana City rosters =

The following is a list of rosters of the UCI Continental team, Astana City, categorised by season.

== 2019 ==
Rider	Date of birth
Galym Akhmetov (KAZ)	20 March 1995 (aged 23)
Olzhas Bayembayev (KAZ)	22 January 1999 (aged 19)
Igor Chzhan (KAZ)	2 October 1999 (aged 19)
Ramis Dinmukhametov (KAZ)	21 September 2000 (aged 18)
Maxim Gridchin (KAZ)	17 May 2000 (aged 18)
Anton Kuzmin (KAZ)	20 November 1996 (aged 22)

Rider	Date of birth
Sergey Luchshenko (KAZ)	25 June 1994 (aged 24)
Daniil Marukhin (KAZ)	13 February 1999 (aged 19)
Bolat Niyazov (KAZ)	24 February 2000 (aged 18)
Nurbergen Nurlykhassym (KAZ)	25 March 2000 (aged 18)
Dinmukhammed Ulysbayev (KAZ)	21 July 1998 (aged 20)
Ivan Zaitsev (KAZ)	24 February 1999 (aged 19)

== 2018 ==
Rider	Date of birth
Galym Akhmetov (KAZ)	20 March 1995 (aged 22)
Olzhas Bayembayev (KAZ)	22 January 1999 (aged 18)
Anton Kuzmin (KAZ)	20 November 1996 (aged 21)
Sergey Luchshenko (KAZ)	25 June 1994 (aged 23)
Daniil Marukhin (KAZ)	13 February 1999 (aged 18)
Yuriy Natarov (KAZ)	28 December 1996 (aged 21)

Rider	Date of birth
Matvey Nikitin (KAZ)	2 July 1992 (aged 25)
Vadim Pronskiy (KAZ)	4 June 1998 (aged 19)
Grigoriy Shtein (KAZ)	6 March 1996 (aged 21)
Vladimir Tsoy (KAZ)	25 April 1997 (aged 20)
Dinmukhammed Ulysbayev (KAZ)	21 July 1998 (aged 19)
Ivan Zaitsev (KAZ)	24 February 1999 (aged 18)

== 2017 ==
Rider	Date of birth
Galym Akhmetov (KAZ)	20 March 1995 (aged 21)
Yuriy Chsherbinin (KAZ)	6 March 1996 (aged 20)
Ilya Gorbushin (KAZ)	18 May 1998 (aged 18)
Nurbolat Kulimbetov (KAZ)	9 May 1992 (aged 24)
Anton Kuzmin (KAZ)	20 November 1996 (aged 20)
Sergey Luchshenko (KAZ)	25 June 1994 (aged 22)
Yuriy Natarov (KAZ)	28 December 1996 (aged 20)

Rider	Date of birth
Matvey Nikitin (KAZ)	2 July 1992 (aged 24)
Nikita Panassenko (KAZ)	18 March 1992 (aged 24)
Vadim Pronskiy (KAZ)	4 June 1998 (aged 18)
Maxim Satlikov (KAZ)	20 January 1997 (aged 19)
Grigoriy Shtein (KAZ)	6 March 1996 (aged 20)
Vladimir Tsoy (KAZ)	25 April 1997 (aged 19)
Dinmukhammed Ulysbayev (KAZ)	21 July 1998 (aged 18)

== 2016 ==
Roster in 2016, age as of 1 January 2016:

Rider	Date of birth
Galym Akhmetov (KAZ)	20 March 1995 (aged 20)
Yuriy Chsherbinin (KAZ)	6 March 1996 (aged 19)
Vadim Galeyev (KAZ)	7 February 1992 (aged 23)
Pavel Gatskiy (KAZ)	1 January 1991 (aged 25)
Nurbolat Kulimbetov (KAZ)	9 May 1992 (aged 23)
Anton Kuzmin (KAZ)	20 November 1996 (aged 19)
Sergey Luchshenko (KAZ)	25 June 1994 (aged 21)
Sultanmurat Miraliyev (KAZ)	13 October 1990 (aged 25)

Rider	Date of birth
Yuriy Natarov (KAZ)	28 December 1996 (aged 19)
Matvey Nikitin (KAZ)	2 July 1992 (aged 23)
Nikita Panassenko (KAZ)	18 March 1992 (aged 23)
Maxim Satlikov (KAZ)	20 January 1997 (aged 18)
Grigoriy Shtein (KAZ)	6 March 1996 (aged 19)
Nikita Stalnov (KAZ)	14 September 1991 (aged 24)
Vladimir Tsoy (KAZ)	25 April 1997 (aged 18)
Alisher Zhumakan (KAZ)	17 January 1991 (aged 24)

== 2015 ==
Roster in 2015, age as of 1 January 2015:

Rider	Date of birth
Galym Akhmetov (KAZ)	20 March 1995 (aged 19)
Pavel Gatskiy (KAZ)	1 January 1991 (aged 24)
Nurbolat Kulimbetov (KAZ)	9 May 1992 (aged 22)
Anton Kuzmin (KAZ)	20 November 1996 (aged 18)
Sergey Luchshenko (KAZ)	25 June 1994 (aged 20)
Yuriy Natarov (KAZ)	28 December 1996 (aged 18)
Matvey Nikitin (KAZ)	2 July 1992 (aged 22)

Rider	Date of birth
Nikita Panassenko (KAZ)	18 March 1992 (aged 22)
Roman Semyonov (KAZ)	23 January 1993 (aged 21)
Sergey Shemyakin (KAZ)	31 August 1995 (aged 19)
Grigoriy Shtein (KAZ)	6 March 1996 (aged 18)
Nikita Stalnov (KAZ)	14 September 1991 (aged 23)
Artyom Zakharov (KAZ)	27 October 1991 (aged 23)

== 2014 ==
Roster in 2014, age as of 1 January 2014:

Rider	Date of birth
Galym Akhmetov (KAZ)	20 March 1995 (aged 18)
Maxat Ayazbayev (KAZ)	27 January 1992 (aged 21)
Marco Benfatto (ITA)	6 January 1988 (aged 25)
Zhandos Bizhigitov (KAZ)	10 June 1991 (aged 22)
Ilya Davidenok (KAZ)	19 April 1992 (aged 21)
Artur Fedosseyev (KAZ)	29 January 1994 (aged 19)
Vadim Galeyev (KAZ)	7 February 1992 (aged 21)
Pavel Gatskiy (KAZ)	1 January 1991 (aged 23)
Abdraimzhan Ishanov (KAZ)	10 April 1990 (aged 23)

Rider	Date of birth
Bakhtiyar Kozhatayev (BLR)	28 March 1992 (aged 21)
Nurbolat Kulimbetov (KAZ)	9 May 1992 (aged 21)
Tilegen Maidos (KAZ)	10 June 1993 (aged 20)
Viktor Okishev (KAZ)	4 February 1994 (aged 19)
Nikita Panassenko (KAZ)	18 March 1992 (aged 21)
Yerlan Pernebekov (KAZ)	16 June 1995 (aged 18)
Dmitriy Rive (KAZ)	19 April 1995 (aged 18)
Michele Scartezzini (ITA)	10 January 1992 (aged 21)
Roman Semyonov (KAZ)	23 January 1993 (aged 20)
Sergey Shemyakin (KAZ)	31 August 1995 (aged 18)

== 2013 ==
Roster in 2013, age as of 1 January 2013:

Rider	Date of birth
Maxat Ayazbayev (KAZ)	27 January 1992 (aged 20)
Marco Benfatto (ITA)	6 January 1988 (aged 24)
Zhandos Bizhigitov (KAZ)	10 June 1991 (aged 21)
Ilya Davidenok (KAZ)	19 April 1992 (aged 20)
Artur Fedosseyev (KAZ)	29 January 1994 (aged 18)
Daniil Fominykh (KAZ)	28 August 1991 (aged 21)
Vladislav Gorbunov (KAZ)	7 December 1991 (aged 21)
Abdraimzhan Ishanov (KAZ)	10 April 1990 (aged 22)
Nazar Jumabekov (KAZ)	3 January 1987 (aged 25)

Rider	Date of birth
Bakhtiyar Kozhatayev (KAZ)	28 March 1992 (aged 20)
Nurbolat Kulimbetov (KAZ)	9 May 1992 (aged 20)
Tilegen Maidos (KAZ)	10 June 1993 (aged 19)
Yevgeniy Nepomnyachshiy (KAZ)	12 March 1987 (aged 25)
Viktor Okishev (KAZ)	4 February 1994 (aged 18)
Sergey Renev (KAZ)	3 February 1985 (aged 27)
Roman Semyonov (KAZ)	23 January 1993 (aged 19)
Alexandr Shushemoin (KAZ)	26 February 1987 (aged 25)
Nikita Stalnov (KAZ)	14 September 1991 (aged 21)

== 2012 ==
Roster in 2012, age as of 1 January 2012:

Rider	Date of birth
Tynys Akanov (KAZ)	3 September 1992 (aged 19)
Maxat Ayazbayev (KAZ)	27 January 1992 (aged 19)
Miras Bederbekov (KAZ)	15 September 1989 (aged 22)
Ilya Davidenok (KAZ)	19 April 1992 (aged 19)
Daniil Fominykh (KAZ)	28 August 1991 (aged 20)
Vladislav Gorbunov (KAZ)	7 December 1991 (aged 20)
Abdraimzhan Ishanov (KAZ)	10 April 1990 (aged 21)
Nazar Jumabekov (KAZ)	3 January 1987 (aged 24)

Rider	Date of birth
Arman Kamyshev (KAZ)	14 March 1991 (aged 20)
Kanstantsin Klimiankou (BLR)	3 August 1989 (aged 22)
Nurbolat Kulimbetov (KAZ)	9 May 1992 (aged 19)
Alexey Lutsenko (KAZ)	7 September 1992 (aged 19)
Roman Semyonov (KAZ)	23 January 1993 (aged 18)
Alexandr Shushemoin (KAZ)	26 February 1987 (aged 24)
Nikita Stalnov (KAZ)	14 September 1991 (aged 20)
Ruslan Tleubayev (KAZ)	7 March 1987 (aged 24)
