= List of people from Astana =

This is a list of people who were born in, residents of, or otherwise closely associated with the city of Astana, Kazakhstan and its surrounding metropolitan statistical area.

- Alexander Achziger (born 1953), ice hockey coach.
- Konstantin Airich (born 1978), heavyweight boxer.
- Damir Akhmetbekov (born 1975), diver.
- Merey Akshalov (born 1988), amateur boxer.
- Anna Alyabyeva (born 1993), rhythmic gymnast.
- Maksim Azovsky (born 1986), football player.
- Yegor Azovsky (born 1985), football player and defender.
- Aida Bauyrzhanova (born 1997), artistic gymnast.
- Nursultan Belgibayev (born 1991), ice hockey forward.
- Larisa Bergen (1949–2023), Olympic volleyball medalist.
- Anton Chichulin (born 1984), football midfielder.
- Ruslan Dälenov (born 1975), politician.
- Samat Daniyar (born 1999), ice hockey player.
- Sayan Daniyar (born 1999), ice hockey player.
- Mukharbek Didigov (born 1952), politician.
- Alexander Galaisha (born 1991), ice hockey goaltender.
- Anzhelika Gavrilova (born 1978), speed skater.
- Dmitriy Gruzdev (born 1986), road bicycle racer.
- Mikhail Gutseriev (born 1958), billionaire businessperson of Ingush descent.
- Maxim Iglinsky (born 1981), road racing cyclist.
- Valentin Iglinsky (born 1984), road racing cyclist.
- Artyom Ignatenko (born 1990), ice hockey player.
- Natalya Ivoninskaya (born 1985), hurdler.
- Arman Kamyshev (born 1991), road racing cyclist.
- Ramazan Karimov (born 1999), football player.
- Alexander Kazantsev (1906–2002), science fiction writer.
- Mels Kenetaev (1945–2021), football player and midfielder.
- Roman Khassanov (born 1996), tennis player.
- Aleksandr Kibalko (born 1973), speed skater.
- Aleksandr Kirov (born 1984), football player.
- Yury Kokhanets (born 1972), speed skater.
- Islambek Kuat (born 1993), football player.
- Anastassiya Lavrova (born 1995), table tennis player.
- Anna Levkovets (born 2007), figure skater.
- David Loriya (born 1981), football goalkeeper.
- Asqar Mamin (born 1965), politician and economist.
- Karim Massimov (born 1965), politician.
- Sultanmurat Miraliyev (born 1990), road and track cyclist.
- Nurbergen Nurlykhassym (born 2000), cyclist.
- Aibek Oralbay (born 2000), amateur boxer.
- Nurbek Oralbay (born 2000), amateur boxer.
- Valeri Orekhov (born 1999), ice hockey defenceman.
- Kirill Panyukov (born 1997), ice hockey winger.
- Dmitry Popko (born 1996), tennis player.
- Angelina Portnova (born 2001), football player.
- Dmitry Pozdnyakov (born 1972), biathlete.
- Vladislav Prokopenko (born 2000), football player.
- Vadim Pronskiy (born 1998), cyclist.
- Rakhimzhan Qoshqarbaev (1924–1988), the first soldier to raise the Soviet Flag at the Reichstag building in Berlin.
- Arutik Rubenian (born 1966), wrestler.
- Yekaterina Rudenko (born 1994), swimmer.
- Dinara Saduakassova (born 1996), chess player.
- Arkady Sarkisyan (born 1959), politician.
- Sergey Shakimov (born 1972), judoka.
- Grigoriy Shtein (born 1996), cyclist.
- Yaroslava Shvedova (born 1987), tennis player.
- Lev Skvortsov (born 2000), football player.
- Nikita Stalnov (born 1991), cyclist.
- Mark Starostin (born 1990), cross-country skier.
- Darya Starostina (born 1982), cross-country skier.
- Tetiana Tarasova (born 1957), speed skater.
- Sanzhar Tashkenbay (born 2003), amateur boxer.
- Sergej Tcherepanov (born 1959), organ and harpsichord teacher and church musician working in Germany.
- Andrey Teteryuk (born 1967), road bicycle racer.
- Kassym-Jomart Tokayev (born 1953), president of Kazakhstan.
- Daneliya Tuleshova (born 2006), singer.
- Gulzat Uralbayeva (born 1989), judoka.
- Galina Voskoboeva (born 1984), tennis player.
- Sergey Yakshin (born 1968), sport shooter.
- Maksim Zhalmagambetov (born 1983), football defender.
- Alisher Zhumakan (born 1997), track and road cyclist.
- Alexander Zozulya (born 1993), ice hockey player.
- Igor Zubrilin (born 1976), cross-country skier.
