= Pavel Gatskiy =

Kazakhstani cyclist (born 1991)

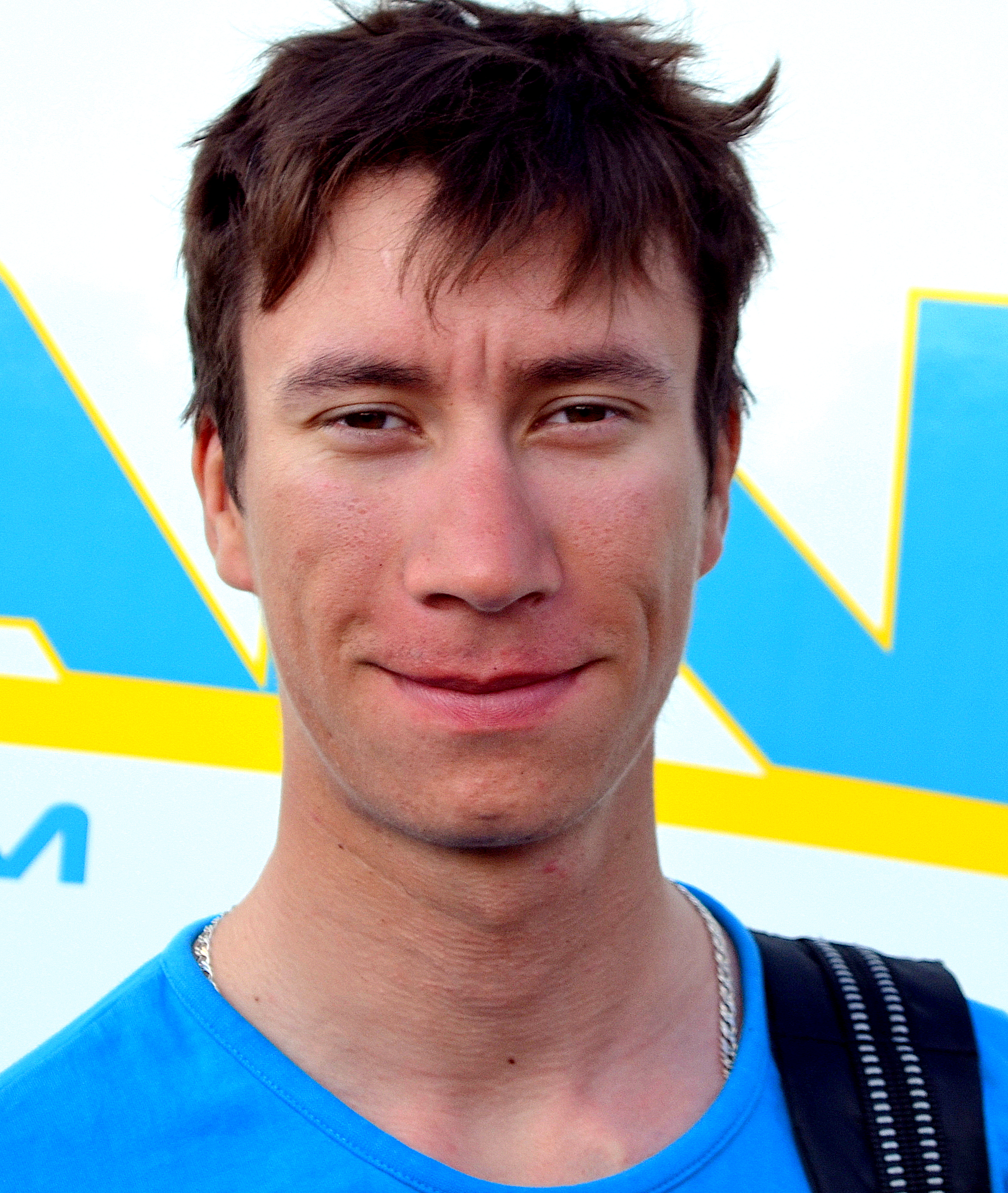
- Gatskiy in 2014

Personal information
- Full name: Pavel Gatskiy; Kazakh: Павел Гацкий
- Born: 1 January 1991 (age 35): Pavlodar, Kazakh SSR, Soviet Union; (now Kazakhstan)

Cycling career
- Sport: Cycling
- Disciplines: Track; Road
- Role: Rider
- Rider type: Points race (track)

Professional teams
- 2014–2016: Continental Team Astana
- 2018: Apple Team

Pavel Gatskiy (born 1 January 1991) is a Kazakhstani road and track cyclist. He competed in the points race event at the 2013 UCI Track Cycling World Championships.

== Major results ==
2012
2nd Madison, Asian Track Championships (with Artyom Zakharov)
2014
2nd Madison, Asian Track Championships (with Nikita Panassenko)
5th Road race, National Road Championships
9th Overall Tour of China I
2015
4th Road race, National Road Championships
4th Overall Bałtyk–Karkonosze Tour
2018
10th Grand Prix Side
