= 2013 Astana season =

Astana
- 2013 season
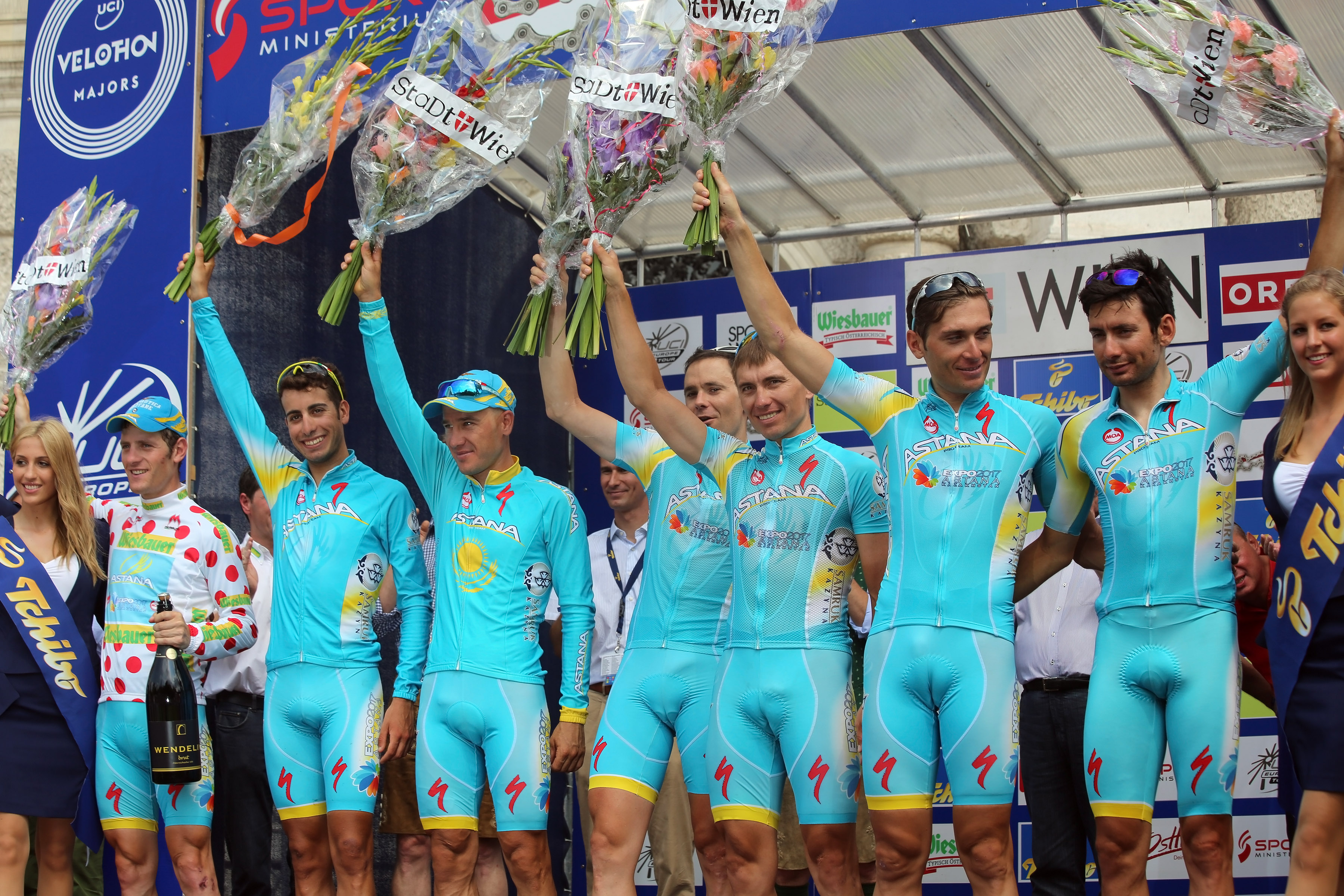
- The team at the 2013 Tour of Austria
- UCI code: AST
- Status: UCI ProTeam
- World Tour Rank: 5th (1045 points)
- Manager: Alexander Vinokourov
- Main sponsor(s): Samruk-Kazyna
- Based: Kazakhstan
- Bicycles: Specialized
- Groupset: Campagnolo

Season victories
- One-day races: 0
- Stage race overall: 3
- Stage race stages: 9
- Grand Tours: 1
- National Championships: 2
- Most wins: Vincenzo Nibali (6 wins)
- Best ranked rider: Vincenzo Nibali (5th)

The 2013 season for the Astana cycling team began in January with the Tour Down Under. As a UCI ProTeam, they were automatically invited and obligated to send a squad to every event in the UCI World Tour.

== Team roster ==
As of 1 January 2013.

Rider	Date of birth
Valerio Agnoli (ITA)	6 January 1985 (age 41)
Fabio Aru (ITA)	3 July 1990 (age 35)
Assan Bazayev (KAZ)	22 February 1981 (age 45)
Borut Božič (SLO)	8 August 1980 (age 45)
Janez Brajkovič (SLO)	18 December 1983 (age 42)
Alexsandr Dyachenko (KAZ)	17 October 1983 (age 42)
Jakob Fuglsang (DEN)	22 March 1985 (age 41)
Enrico Gasparotto (ITA)	22 March 1982 (age 44)
Francesco Gavazzi (ITA)	1 August 1984 (age 41)
Dmitriy Gruzdev (KAZ)	13 March 1986 (age 40)
Andrea Guardini (ITA)	12 June 1989 (age 36)
Jacopo Guarnieri (ITA)	14 August 1987 (age 38)
Andriy Hryvko (UKR)	7 August 1983 (age 42)
Evan Huffman (USA)	7 January 1990 (age 36)
Maxim Iglinsky (KAZ)	18 April 1981 (age 45)

Rider	Date of birth
Arman Kamyshev (KAZ)	14 March 1991 (age 35)
Tanel Kangert (EST)	11 March 1987 (age 39)
Andrey Kashechkin (KAZ)	21 March 1980 (age 46)
Fredrik Kessiakoff (SWE)	17 May 1980 (age 46)
Alexey Lutsenko (KAZ)	7 September 1992 (age 33)
Dimitry Muravyev (KAZ)	2 November 1979 (age 46)
Vincenzo Nibali (ITA)	14 November 1984 (age 41)
Simone Ponzi (ITA)	17 January 1987 (age 39)
Kevin Seeldraeyers (BEL)	12 September 1986 (age 39)
Egor Silin (RUS)	25 June 1988 (age 37)
Paolo Tiralongo (ITA)	8 July 1977 (age 48)
Ruslan Tleubayev (KAZ)	7 March 1987 (age 39)
Alessandro Vanotti (ITA)	16 September 1980 (age 45)
Andrey Zeits (KAZ)	14 December 1986 (age 39)

Riders who joined the team for the 2013 season

Rider	2012 team
Valerio Agnoli	Liquigas–Cannondale
Jakob Fuglsang	RadioShack–Nissan
Andrea Guardini	Farnese Vini–Selle Italia
Evan Huffman	neo-pro (Californian Giant)
Arman Kamyshev	Astana Continental Team
Alexey Lutsenko	Astana Continental Team
Vincenzo Nibali	Liquigas–Cannondale
Ruslan Tleubayev	Astana Continental Team
Alessandro Vanotti	Liquigas–Cannondale

Riders who left the team during or after the 2012 season

Rider	2012 team
Dmitry Fofonov	Retired
Valentin Iglinsky	Ag2r–La Mondiale
Robert Kišerlovski	RadioShack–Leopard
Roman Kreuziger	Saxo–Tinkoff
Francesco Masciarelli	Retired
Yevgeniy Nepomnyachshiy	Astana Continental Team
Evgeni Petrov	Saxo–Tinkoff
Sergey Renev	Astana Continental Team
Alexander Vinokourov	Retired

== Season victories ==
Date	Race	Competition	Rider	Country	Location
27 February	Tour de Langkawi, Stage 7	UCI Asia Tour	Andrea Guardini (ITA)	Malaysia	Dungun
12 March	Tirreno–Adriatico, Overall	UCI World Tour	Vincenzo Nibali (ITA)	Italy	
19 April	Giro del Trentino, Stage 4	UCI Europe Tour	Vincenzo Nibali (ITA)	Italy	Ala
19 April	Giro del Trentino, Overall	UCI Europe Tour	Vincenzo Nibali (ITA)	Italy	
19 April	Giro del Trentino, Mountains classification	UCI Europe Tour	Vincenzo Nibali (ITA)	Italy	
19 April	Giro del Trentino, Young rider classification	UCI Europe Tour	Fabio Aru (ITA)	Italy	
19 April	Giro del Trentino, Teams classification	UCI Europe Tour	(Note: The riders on the squad were Vincenzo Nibali, Paolo Tiralongo, Fabio Aru, Alessandro Vanotti, Valerio Agnoli, Tanel Kangert, Alexsandr Dyachenko and Fredrik Kessiakoff)	Italy	
23 May	Giro d'Italia, Stage 18	UCI World Tour	Vincenzo Nibali (ITA)	Italy	Pölsa
25 May	Tour of Belgium, Stage 4	UCI Europe Tour	Maxim Iglinsky (KAZ)	Belgium	Lacs de l'Eau d'Heure
25 May	Giro d'Italia, Stage 20	UCI World Tour	Vincenzo Nibali (ITA)	Italy	Tre Cime di Lavaredo
26 May	Giro d'Italia, Overall	UCI World Tour	Vincenzo Nibali (ITA)	Italy	
16 June	Tour de Suisse, Teams classification	UCI World Tour	(Note: The riders on the squad were Janez Brajkovič, Alexsandr Dyachenko, Enrico Gasparotto, Jacopo Guarnieri, Arman Kamyshev, Tanel Kangert, Andrey Kashechkin and Simone Ponzi)	Switzerland	
30 June	Tour of Austria, Stage 1	UCI Europe Tour	Kevin Seeldraeyers (BEL)	Austria	Kühtai
1 July	Tour of Austria, Stage 2	UCI Europe Tour	Kevin Seeldraeyers (BEL)	Austria	Kitzbüheler Horn
7 July	Tour of Austria, Points classification	UCI Europe Tour	Kevin Seeldraeyers (BEL)	Austria	
7 July	Tour of Austria, Mountains classification	UCI Europe Tour	Kevin Seeldraeyers (BEL)	Austria	
7 July	Tour of Austria, Teams classification	UCI Europe Tour	(Note: The riders on the squad were Fabio Aru, Borut Božič, Alexsandr Dyachenko, Andrea Guardini, Maxim Iglinsky, Andriy Hryvko, Simone Ponzi and Kevin Seeldraeyers)	Austria	
7 August	Vuelta a Burgos, Stage 1	UCI Europe Tour	Simone Ponzi (ITA)	Spain	Burgos
24 August	Vuelta a España, Stage 1	UCI World Tour	Team time trial (Note: The riders on the squad were Janez Brajkovič, Vincenzo Nibali, Andrey Zeits, Jakob Fuglsang, Andriy Hryvko, Maxim Iglinsky, Tanel Kangert, Paolo Tiralongo and Alessandro Vanotti)	Spain	Sanxenxo
