= Vadim Galeyev =

Kazakhstani cyclist

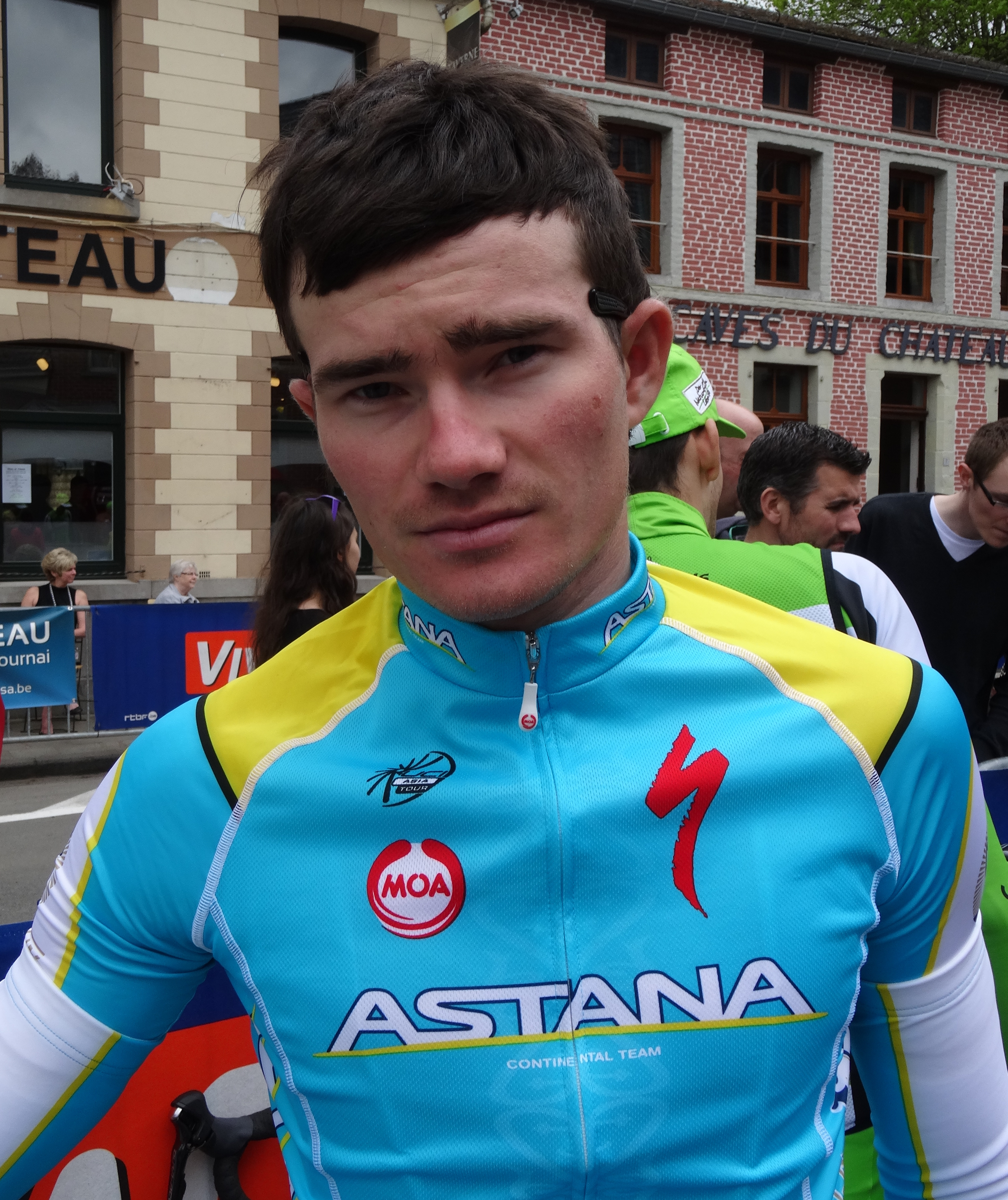
- Galeyev in 2014

Personal information
- Full name: Vadim Galeyev
- Born: 7 February 1992 (age 34) Petropavl, Kazakhstan
- Height: 1.78 m (5 ft 10 in)
- Weight: 68 kg (150 lb)

Cycling career
- Sport: Cycling
- Discipline: Road
- Role: Rider

Professional teams
- 2014: Continental Team Astana
- 2015: Vino 4ever
- 2016: Astana City
- 2017: RTS–Monton Racing Team
- 2018: Apple Team

Vadim Galeyev (born 7 February 1992) is a Kazakh cyclist, who last rode for UCI Continental team Apple Team.

== Major results ==
2014
1st Road race, Asian Under-23 Road Championships
1st Stage 2 Tour de Bretagne
4th Overall Tour of China II

1st Stage 3

2015
9th Sochi Cup
2016
6th Grand Prix of Vinnytsia
7th Grand Prix of ISD
2018
7th Race Horizon Park Classic
8th Overall Tour of Mediterrennean
