= Stepan Astafyev =

Kazakhstani cyclist (born 1994)

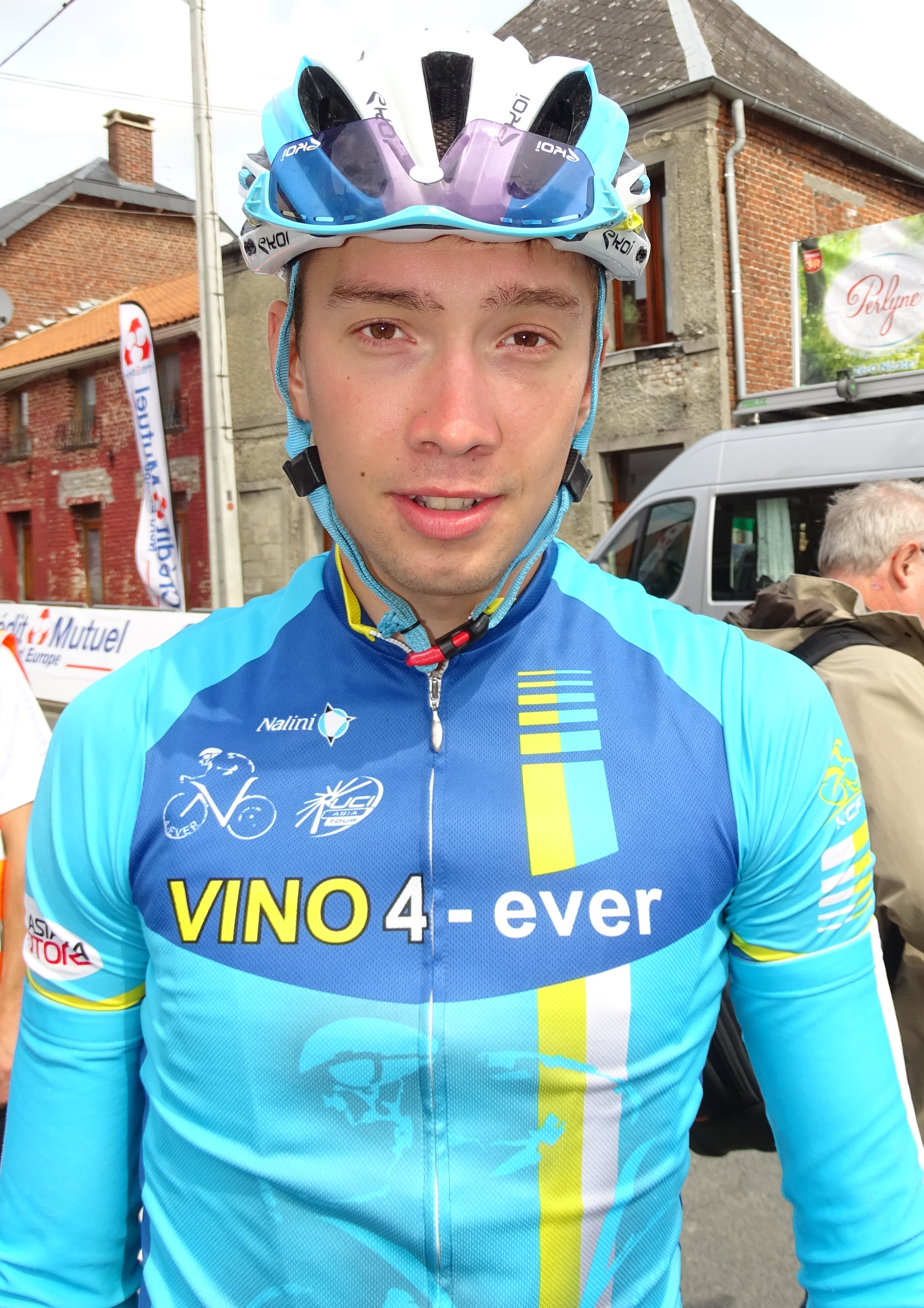
- Astafyev in 2015

Personal information
- Full name: Stepan Yuryevich Astafyev; Russian: Степан Юрьевич Астафьев
- Born: 27 January 1994 (age 32) Petropavl, Kazakhstan

Cycling career
- Sport: Cycling
- Discipline: Road
- Role: Rider

Professional teams
- 2014–2020: Vino 4ever
- 2021: Almaty Cycling Team

Stepan Yuryevich Astafyev (Russian: Степан Юрьевич Астафьев; born 27 January 1994) is a Kazakhstani professional racing cyclist, who most recently rode for UCI Continental team Almaty Cycling Team. He rode in the men's team time trial at the 2015 UCI Road World Championships.

== Major results ==
2014
6th Tour of Almaty
2015
National Road Championships

1st Under-23 time trial
3rd Road race
3rd Time trial
3rd Under-23 road race

2016
1st Stage 2 Tour de Taiwan
2nd Time trial, National Under-23 Road Championships
2017
10th Overall Tour of Ukraine

1st Prologue

2018
1st Grand Prix Side
2nd Overall Sri Lanka T-Cup

1st Points classification

2nd Overall Tour de Korea
Asian Cycling Championships

5th Time trial
7th Road race

2019
4th Overall Five Rings of Moscow
2021
4th Time trial, National Road Championships
