= Dinmukhammed Ulysbayev =

Kazakh cyclist (1998–2023)

Personal information
- Born: 21 July 1998 Taraz, Kazakhstan
- Died: 17 May 2023 (aged 24) Los Angeles, California, U.S.

Cycling career
- Sport: Cycling
- Discipline: Road
- Role: Rider

Professional teams
- 2017–2019: Astana City
- 2020: Vino–Astana Motors
- 2021–2022: Apple Team

Dinmukhammed Ulysbayev (21 July 1998 – 17 May 2023) was a Kazakh road racing cyclist.

Ulysbayev died from acute heart failure in Los Angeles, on 17 May 2023, at the age of 24.

== Major results ==
2015
1st Road race, National Junior Road Championships
9th Overall Course de la Paix Juniors
9th Overall Tour du Pays de Vaud
2016
1st Road race, Asian Junior Road Championships
1st Overall Giro di Basilicata

1st Points classification
1st Stage 1

2nd Time trial, National Junior Road Championships
2nd Overall Tour du Pays de Vaud

1st Stage 2a

6th Overall Trophée Centre Morbihan
10th Overall Course de la Paix Juniors
2017
1st Stage 3 Grand Prix Priessnitz spa
5th Overall CCC Tour - Grody Piastowskie

1st Young rider classification

7th Overall Bałtyk–Karkonosze Tour
