= Matvey Nikitin =

Kazakh cyclist

Personal information
- Full name: Matvey Nikitin
- Born: 2 July 1992 (age 34) Oral, Kazakhstan
- Height: 1.7 m (5 ft 7 in)
- Weight: 61 kg (134 lb)

Cycling career
- Sport: Cycling
- Discipline: Road
- Role: Rider

Amateur teams
- 2012: GS Parmense
- 2013–2014: Named–Ferroli

Professional teams
- 2015–2018: Seven Rivers Cycling Team
- 2019–2021: Vino–Astana Motors

Matvey Nikitin (born 2 July 1992) is a Kazakh cyclist, who most recently rode for UCI Continental team Vino–Astana Motors.

== Major results ==
2013
7th Road race, National Road Championships
2014
8th Giro del Medio Brenta
2015
2nd Minsk Cup
3rd Overall Podlasie Tour
5th Road race, National Road Championships
5th Overall Okolo Slovenska
5th Overall Black Sea Cycling Tour
8th Overall Bałtyk–Karkonosze Tour
9th Grand Prix Minsk
2016
3rd Road race, National Road Championships
3rd Overall North Cyprus Cycling Tour
3rd Grand Prix of ISD
7th Race Horizon Park Classic
2017
5th Overall Tour of Mersin
6th Coppa della Pace
8th Overall Tour of China I
9th Overall Gemenc Grand Prix
2018
4th Road race, National Road Championships
2019
1st Odessa Grand Prix
3rd Tour de Ribas
5th Horizon Park Race Classic
7th Chabany Race
9th Overall Tour of Peninsular
10th Overall Tour of China II
2020
4th Malaysian International Classic Race
