= Oleg Zemlyakov =

Kazakhstani cyclist

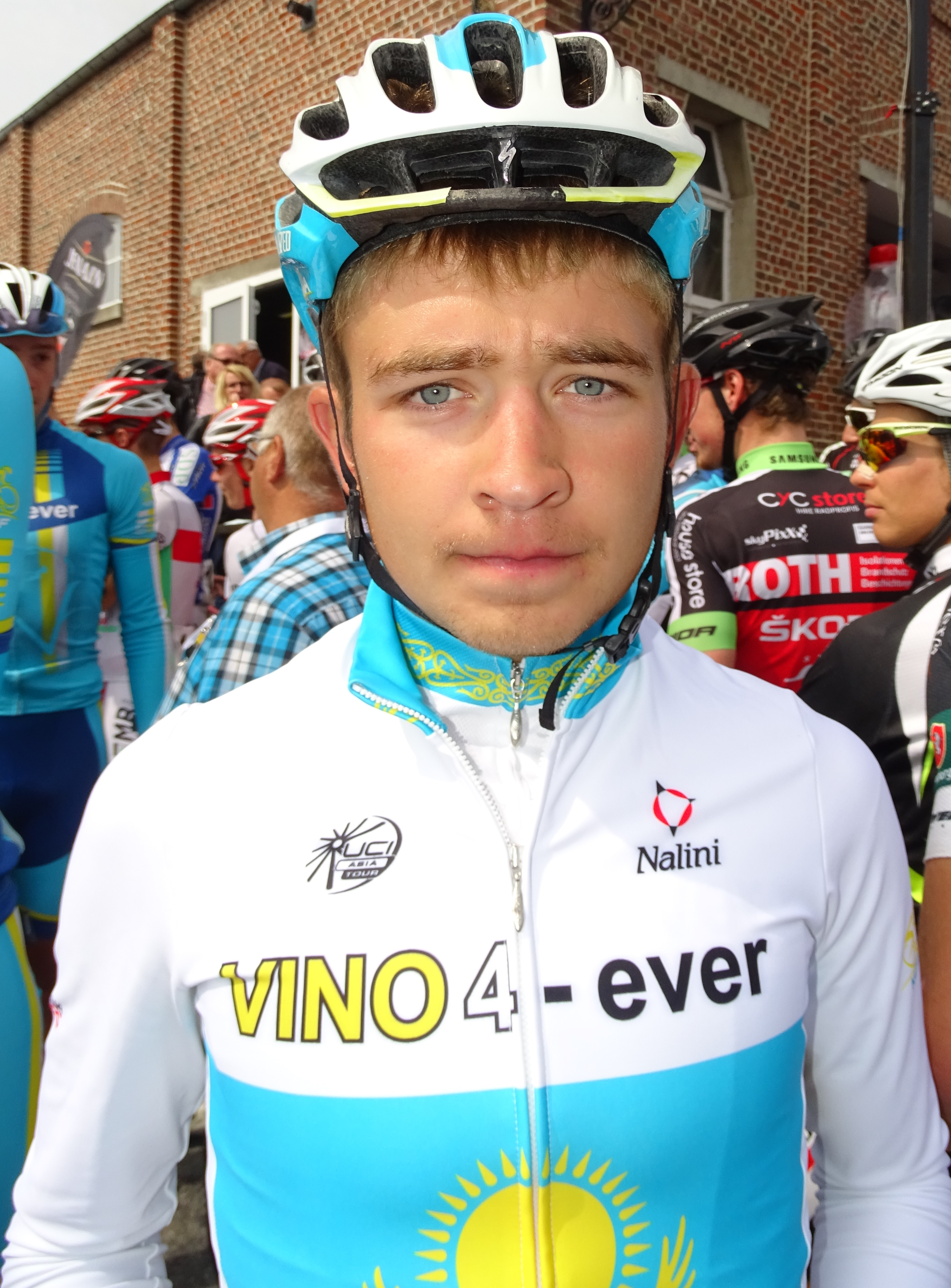
- Zemlyakov at the 2015 Grand Prix des Marbriers

Personal information
- Full name: Oleg Zemlyakov
- Born: 7 July 1993 (age 33) Petropavl, Kazakhstan

Cycling career
- Sport: Cycling
- Discipline: Road
- Role: Rider

Professional teams
- 2014–2017: Vino 4ever
- 2018–2019: Apple Team

Major wins
- Stage races Tour de Filipinas (2016) One-day races and Classics National Road Race Championships (2015)

Oleg Zemlyakov (born 7 July 1993) is a Kazakhstani professional racing cyclist. He rode in the men's team time trial at the 2015 UCI Road World Championships.

He was crowned as the champion of the 2016 Tour de Filipinas individual general classification after 4 stages; He finished first in the race with a time of 17 hours, 36 minutes and 52 seconds to claim the yellow jersey.

== Major results ==
2014
2nd Road race, Asian Under-23 Road Championships
2nd Time trial, National Road Championships
2015
1st Road race, National Road Championships
2nd Overall Tour of Szeklerland
2nd Overall Tour of Bulgaria

1st Young rider classification

3rd Grand Prix des Marbriers
4th Time trial, Asian Under-23 Road Championships
5th Overall Tour de Filipinas

1st Young rider classification

6th Overall Okolo Slovenska

1st Young rider classification

6th Trofeo Internazionale Bastianelli
7th Overall Tour of Thailand
7th Overall Grand Prix of Adygeya
8th Overall Tour of Black Sea

1st Young rider classification

2016
1st Overall Tour de Filipinas

1st Stage 2
