= Pierre-Henry Basset =

French cyclist

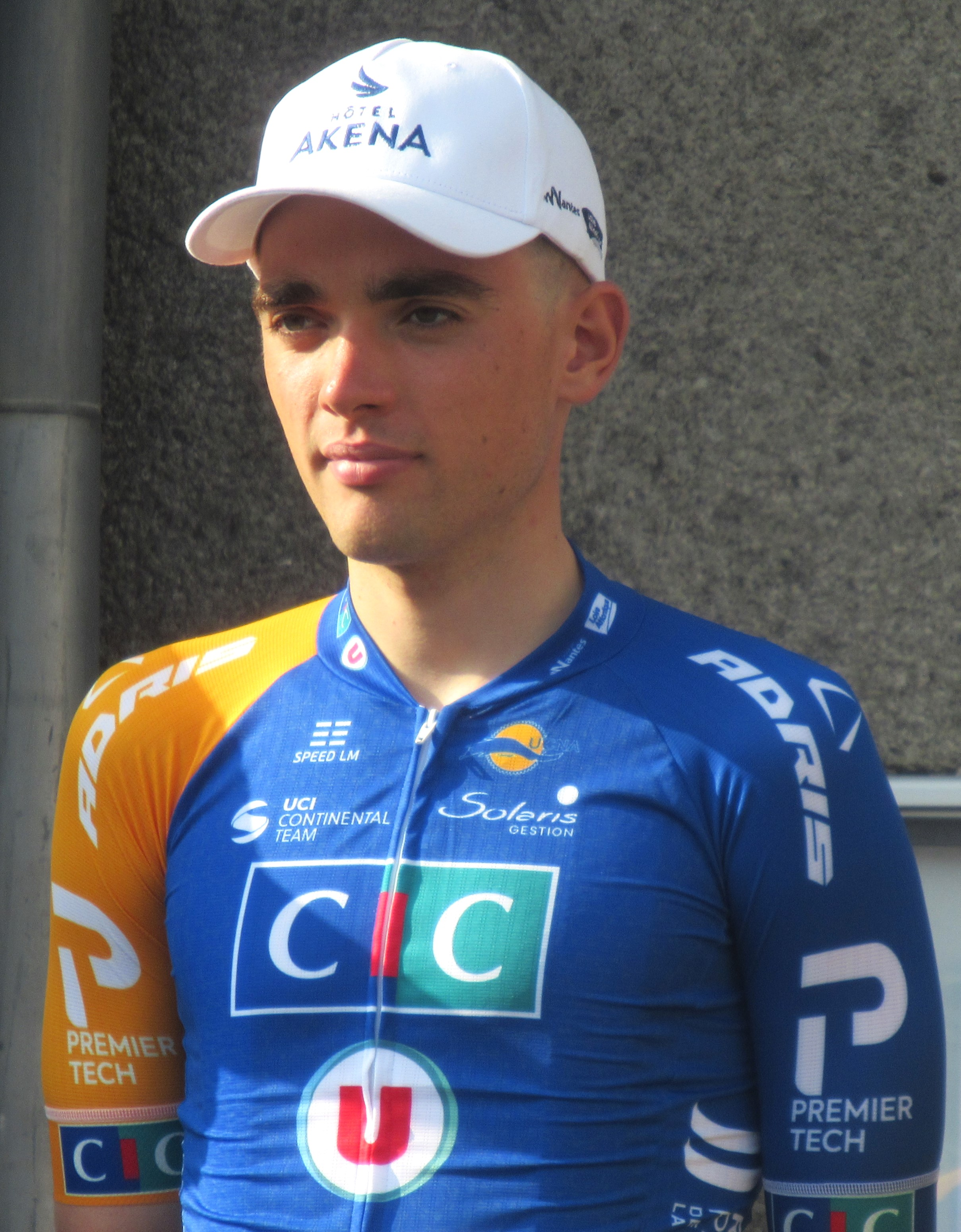
- Basset in 2024

Personal information
- Born: 29 March 2004 (age 22) Bréhand, France
- Height: 1.78 m (5 ft 10 in)
- Weight: 69 kg (152 lb)

Cycling career
- Sport: Cycling
- Current team: XDS Astana Development Team
- Discipline: Road
- Role: Rider

Amateur team
- 2021–2023: VC Pays de Loudéac

Professional teams
- 2024: CIC U Nantes Atlantique
- 2025–: XDS Astana Development Team

Pierre-Henry Basset (born 29 March 2004) is a French cyclist, who currently rides for UCI Continental team XDS Astana Development Team.

== Major results ==
2022
4th Overall La Ronde des Vallées

1st Stage 2b

2023
3rd Essor basque
7th Flèche de Locminé
8th Boucles guégonnaises
2024
1st Grand Prix de Plouay
5th Overall Tour Alsace
5th Polynormande
7th Overall Tour de Bretagne
2025
1st Overall International Tour of Rhodes

1st Young rider classification
1st Stage 3

2nd International Rhodes Grand Prix
10th Overall Visit South Aegean Islands
2026
10th Overall Tour du Limousin
