= Kyiv Capital Racing =

Ukrainian cycling team

Team information
- Registered: Ukraine
- Founded: 2015
- Disbanded: 2015
- Discipline: Road
- Status: UCI Continental

Team name history
- 2015: Kyiv Capital Racing

Kyiv Capital Racing was a UCI Continental team founded in 2015 and based in Ukraine. It took participation in UCI Continental Circuits races.

== Team roster ==
As of 1 July 2015.

Rider	Date of birth
Konstantin Ashurov (UKR)	10 October 1996 (age 29)
Pavlo Bondarenko (UKR)	10 September 1996 (age 29)
Igor Gregul (UKR)	30 December 1993 (age 32)
Oleksiy Kasyanov (UKR)	22 February 1992 (age 34)
Andriy Khripta (UKR)	23 November 1986 (age 39)
Daniil Kondakov (UKR)	25 September 1994 (age 31)

Rider	Date of birth
Sergiy Kozachenko (UKR)	18 May 1994 (age 32)
Anton Moruga (UKR)	12 April 1995 (age 31)
Iurii Shilimov (UKR)	26 September 1995 (age 30)
Mykyta Skorenko (UKR)	28 June 1993 (age 33)
Valerii Taradai (UKR)	11 August 1994 (age 32)

== Major results ==
2015
Grand Prix of ISD, Andriy Khripta
