= XDS Astana Development Team =

Kazakh cycling team

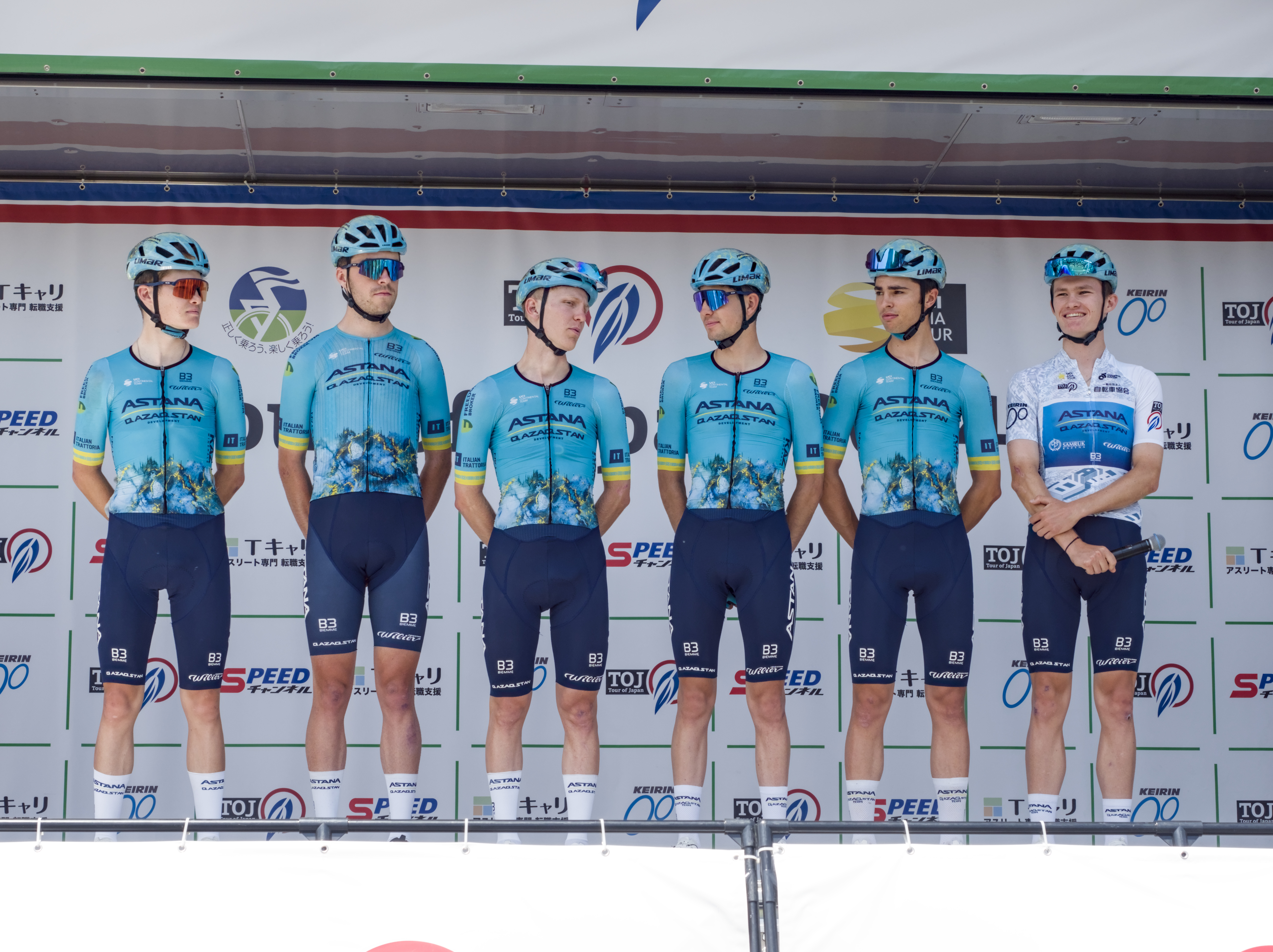
- Riders on the team in 2024

Team information
- UCI code: AQD
- Registered: Kazakhstan
- Founded: 2022
- Discipline: Road
- Status: UCI Continental

Key personnel
- General manager: Serguei Yakovlev; Alexandre Vinokourov
- Team managers: Alexandr Shushemoin; Alexandre Shefer; Claudio Cucinotta; Giacomo Notari; Giuseppe Martinelli; Orlando Maini

Team name history
2022–2024	Astana Qazaqstan Development Team
2025–	XDS Astana Development Team

The XDS Astana Development Team is a Kazakhstani UCI Continental cycling team established in 2022. The team acts as the development program for UCI WorldTeam XDS Astana Team.

For the 2022 season the team focused on two goals; To provide a gateway for Kazakh cyclists to reach a higher level and to have a team that will be competitive as a UCI Continental team. With the same goals going into the 2023 season the team focused more on Kazakhstan growth with six riders from Kazakhstan and the rest from around the world.

The first win that was not a national championship came in 2023 at the Tour of Sakarya where Astana Qazaqstan Team rider won while riding for the development team. A rule introduced in 2020 allows riders from the development team to race with the Main team in select races and it allows Main team riders to race with the development team.

In September 2024 Ilkhan Dostiyev was suspended and had his contract terminated after admitting to using a banned substance following an anti-doping rule violation in July 2024.

== Team roster ==
As of 30 June 2025.

Rider	Date of birth
Luca Attolini (ITA)	16 October 2006 (age 19)
Pierre-Henry Basset (FRA)	29 March 2004 (age 22)
Alessio Delle Vedove (ITA)	11 February 2004 (age 22)
Artem Fofonov (FRA)	8 January 2005 (age 21)
Lev Gonov (RUS)	6 January 2000 (age 26)
Daniil Marukhin (KAZ)	13 February 1999 (age 27)
Ludovico Maria Mellano (ITA)	23 August 2006 (age 20)
Mattia Negrente (ITA)	28 May 2005 (age 21)

Rider	Date of birth
Ivan Smirnov (RUS)	14 January 1999 (age 27)
Gleb Syritsa (RUS)	14 April 2000 (age 26)
Santiago Umba (COL)	20 November 2002 (age 23)
Alexandre Vinokurov (KAZ)	7 July 2002 (age 24)
Gustav Wang (DEN)	13 March 2003 (age 23)
Ruslan Yelyubayev (KAZ)	28 June 2002 (age 24)
Simone Zanini (ITA)	26 March 2004 (age 22)
David Zanutta (ITA)	5 January 2006 (age 20)

== Major wins ==
2022
Kazakhstan National Under-23 Time Trial, Daniil Pronskiy
Kazakhstan National Under-23 Road Race, Nicolas Vinokurov
2023
Overall Tour of Sakarya, Martin Laas

Stage 2, Martin Laas

Asian Under-23 Time Trial, Andrey Remkhe
Kazakhstan National Under-23 Time Trial, Maxim Taraski
Kazakhstan National Under-23 Road Race, Nicolas Vinokurov
Stages 1b & 5 Tour of Bulgaria, Michele Gazzoli
2024
Stages 2 & 3 International Tour of Rhodes, Alessandro Romele
GP Goriška & Vipava Valley, Mattia Negrente
Stage 2 Belgrade–Banja Luka, Davide Toneatti
Stages 1 (ITT) & 7 Tour of Japan, Max Walker
Stage 5 Tour of Japan, Nicolas Vinokurov
Kazakhstan National Under-23 Time Trial, Andrey Remkhe
Stage 2b (ITT) Sibiu Cycling Tour, Max Walker
Stage 1 Giro della Valle d'Aosta, Ilkhan Dostiyev
Overall Tour of Szeklerland, Lev Gonov

Prologue, Lev Gonov

Overall Tour of Romania, Davide Toneatti

Stage 2, Rudolf Remkhi
Stage 4, Ivan Smirnov

2025
Stage 1 Visit South Aegean Islands, Mattia Negrente
Overall International Tour of Rhodes, Pierre-Henry Basset

Prologue, Gleb Syritsa
Stage 3, Pierre-Henry Basset

Popolarissima, Ivan Smirnov
Stage 3 Ronde de l'Isard, Ludovico Maria Mellano
2026
Overall International Tour of Rhodes, Matteo Scalco

== National & continental champions ==
2022
Kazakhstani Under-23 Time Trial, Daniil Pronskiy
Kazakhstani Under-23 Road Race, Nicolas Vinokurov
2023
Asian Under-23 Time Trial, Andrey Remkhe
Kazakhstani Under-23 Time Trial, Maxim Taraskin
Kazakhstani Under-23 Road Race, Nicolas Vinokurov
2024
Kazakhstani Under-23 Time Trial, Andrey Remkhe
