= Daniil Marukhin =

Kazakh cyclist

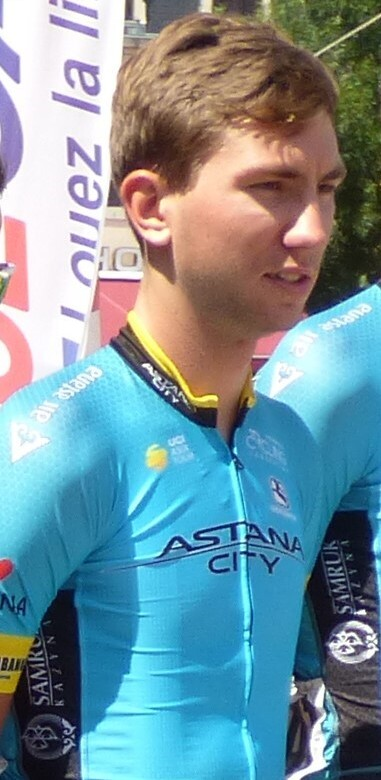
- Marukhin in 2019

Personal information
- Born: 23 February 1999 (age 27) Kostanay, Kazakhstan
- Height: 1.80 m (5 ft 11 in)
- Weight: 63 kg (139 lb)

Cycling career
- Sport: Cycling
- Current team: XDS Astana Development Team
- Discipline: Road
- Role: Rider

Professional teams
- 2018–2019: Astana City
- 2020–2021: Vino–Astana Motors
- 2022: Almaty Cycling Team
- 2023: Vino SKO Team
- 2024: Astana Qazaqstan Team
- 2025–: XDS Astana Development Team

Daniil Marukhin (Kazakh: Даниил Марухин; born 13 February 1999) is a Kazakh cyclist, who currently rides for UCI Continental team XDS Astana Development Team.

== Major results ==
2017
1st Road race, Asian Junior Road Championships
2nd Overall Tour de DMZ
3rd Road race, National Junior Road Championships
2019
3rd Road race, Asian Under-23 Road Championships
4th Road race, National Road Championships
2021
National Under-23 Road Championships

2nd Road race
4th Time trial

2022
2nd Grand Prix Mediterrennean
2nd Grand Prix Kapuzbaşı
4th Time trial, National Road Championships
5th Grand Prix Gündoğmuş
7th Grand Prix Tomarza
9th Grand Prix Cappadocia
10th Grand Prix Velo Alanya
2023
1st Overall Tour of Van

1st Stage 1

1st Tour of Bostonliq I
1st Grand Prix Kültepe
National Road Championships

3rd Road race
5th Time trial

3rd Overall Tour of The Republic

1st Stage 5

4th Overall Tour of Sakarya
4th Grand Prix Aspendos
4th The Tour Oqtosh–Chorvoq–Mountain I
4th The Tour Oqtosh–Chorvoq–Mountain II
6th Overall Tour of Azerbaijan (Iran)
6th Overall Aziz Shusha
6th Tour of Kandovan
7th Grand Prix Kaisareia
10th Tour of Bostonliq II
2025
3rd Road race, National Road Championships
4th Grand Prix Aspendos
