= Viktor Okishev =

Kazakhstani cyclist

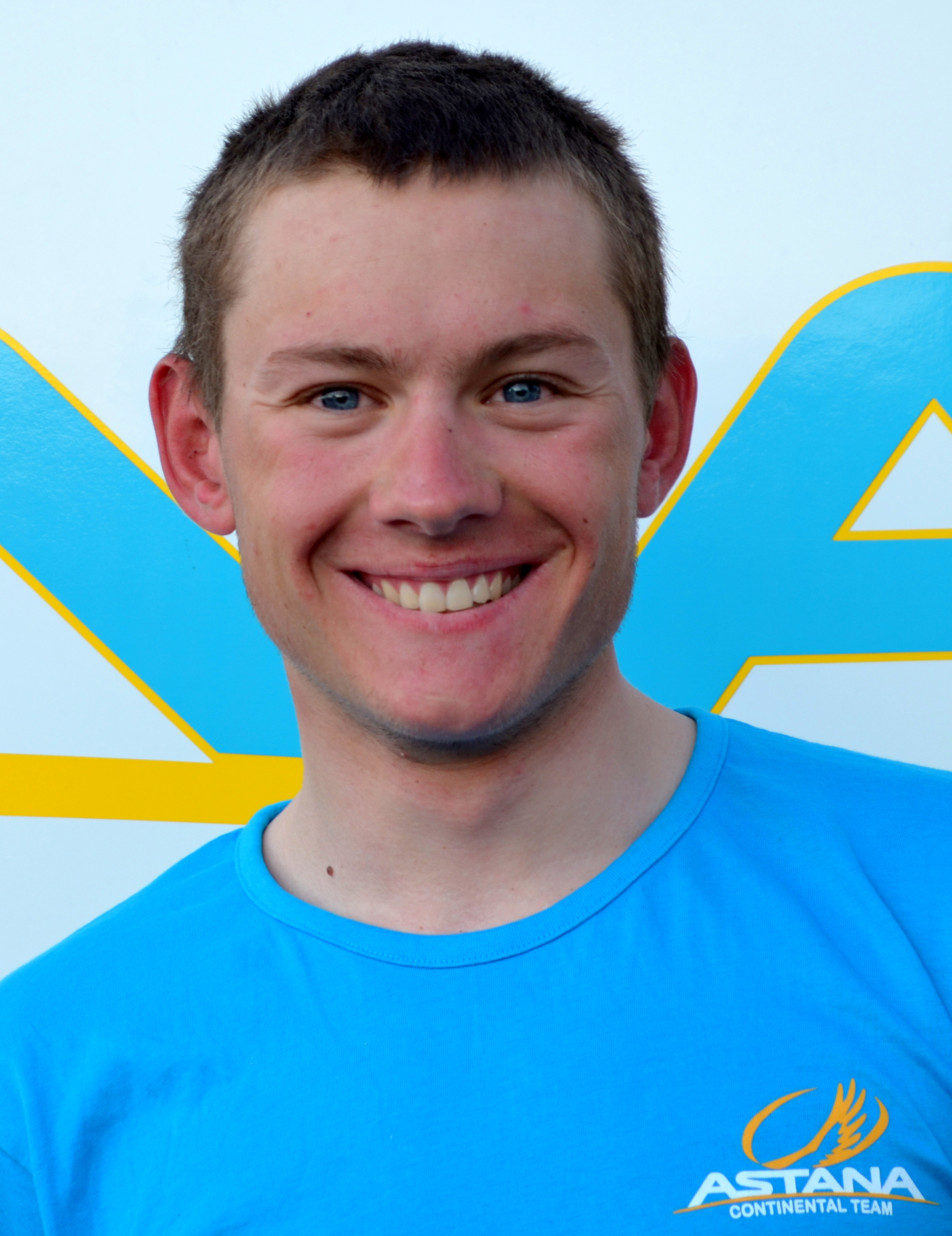
- Okishev at the 2014 Tour de l'Ain

Personal information
- Full name: Viktor Okishev
- Born: 4 February 1994 (age 32) Petropavl, Kazakhstan

Cycling career
- Sport: Cycling
- Current team: Suspended
- Discipline: Road
- Role: Rider

Amateur team
- 2013: Continental Team Astana (stagiaire)

Professional teams
- 2014: Continental Team Astana
- 2017: Keyi Look Cycling Team
- 2018: Vino–Astana Motors

Viktor Okishev (born 4 February 1994 in Petropavl) is a Kazakh cyclist, who is currently suspended from the sport.

He was suspended for 2 years in 2014 when he tested positive for anabolic steroids, and was suspended for 8 years in 2018, following a second positive test for erythropoietin (EPO).

== Major results ==
2013
4th Time trial, National Road Championships
2014
~~1st Time trial, Asian Under-23 Road Championships~~
