= Andriy Khripta =

Ukrainian cyclist (born 1986)

Personal information
- Born: 29 November 1986 (age 39) Znamianka, Kirovohrad Oblast, Soviet Union

Cycling career
- Sport: Cycling
- Current team: Retired
- Discipline: Road
- Role: Rider

Professional teams
- 2011–2014: Kolss Cycling Team
- 2015: Kyiv Capital Racing
- 2016: Kolss BDC Team

Andriy Khripta (Ukrainian: Андрій Іванович Хрипта; born 29 November 1986) is a Ukrainian former racing cyclist. He rode at the 2014 UCI Road World Championships.

== Major results ==
2011
8th Grand Prix of Donetsk
2012
1st Stage 2 (TTT) Sibiu Cycling Tour
6th Overall Grand Prix of Adygeya
2013
1st Overall Grand Prix of Adygeya
2nd Memorial Oleg Dyachenko
7th Overall Tour of Romania

1st Prologue (TTT)

8th Overall Five Rings of Moscow
2014
7th Overall Tour of Iran
2015
1st Grand Prix of ISD
2nd Time trial, National Road Championships
2nd Overall Five Rings of Moscow
3rd Grand Prix of Vinnytsia
6th Race Horizon Park for Peace
2016
2nd Time trial, National Road Championships
