= Maxat Ayazbayev =

Kazakh cyclist (born 1992)

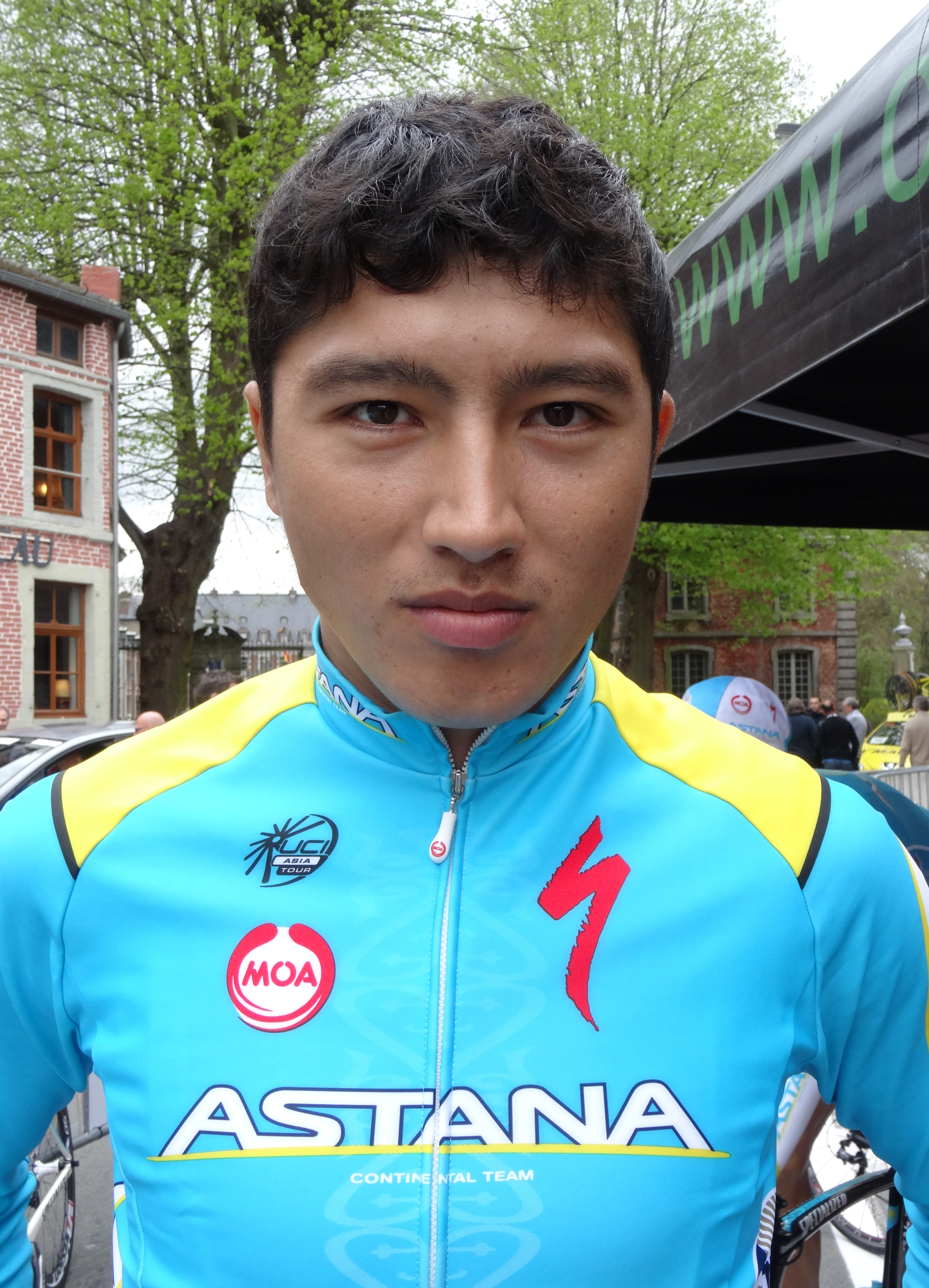
- Ayazbayev in 2014

Personal information
- Full name: Maxat Mukhtarovich Ayazbayev
- Born: January 27, 1992 (age 34) Baktybai, Kazakhstan
- Height: 1.89 m (6 ft 2 in)
- Weight: 75 kg (165 lb; 11.8 st)

Cycling career
- Sport: Cycling
- Current team: Almaty Continental Team
- Discipline: Road
- Role: Rider (retired); Directeur sportif

Amateur team
- 2011: Odo–Astana

Professional teams
- 2012–2014: Continental Team Astana
- 2014: Astana (stagiaire)
- 2015–2016: Astana
- 2017: Keyi Look Cycling Team
- 2018: Apple Team

Managerial team
- 2019–: Apple Team

Maxat Mukhtarovich Ayazbayev (Kazakh: Мақсат Мұхтарұлы Аязбаев, Russian: Максат Мухтарович Аязбаев, born January 27, 1992, in Baktybai) is a Kazakh former road cyclist, who currently works as a directeur sportif for UCI Continental team Almaty Continental Team.

== Major results ==
2010
1st Overall Giro della Lunigiana

1st Stage 1

2nd Road race, Asian Junior Road Championships
5th Overall Tour du Pays de Vaud
2012
1st Overall Tour of Bulgaria

1st Young rider classification

2013
1st Trofeo Internazionale Bastianelli
6th Gran Premio Sportivi di Poggiana
7th Overall Coupe des nations Ville Saguenay
2014
1st Young rider classification Vuelta Independencia Nacional
2nd Overall Vuelta Mexico Telmex
3rd Road race, Asian Under-23 Road Championships
