= Ilkhan Dostiyev =

Kazakh cyclist

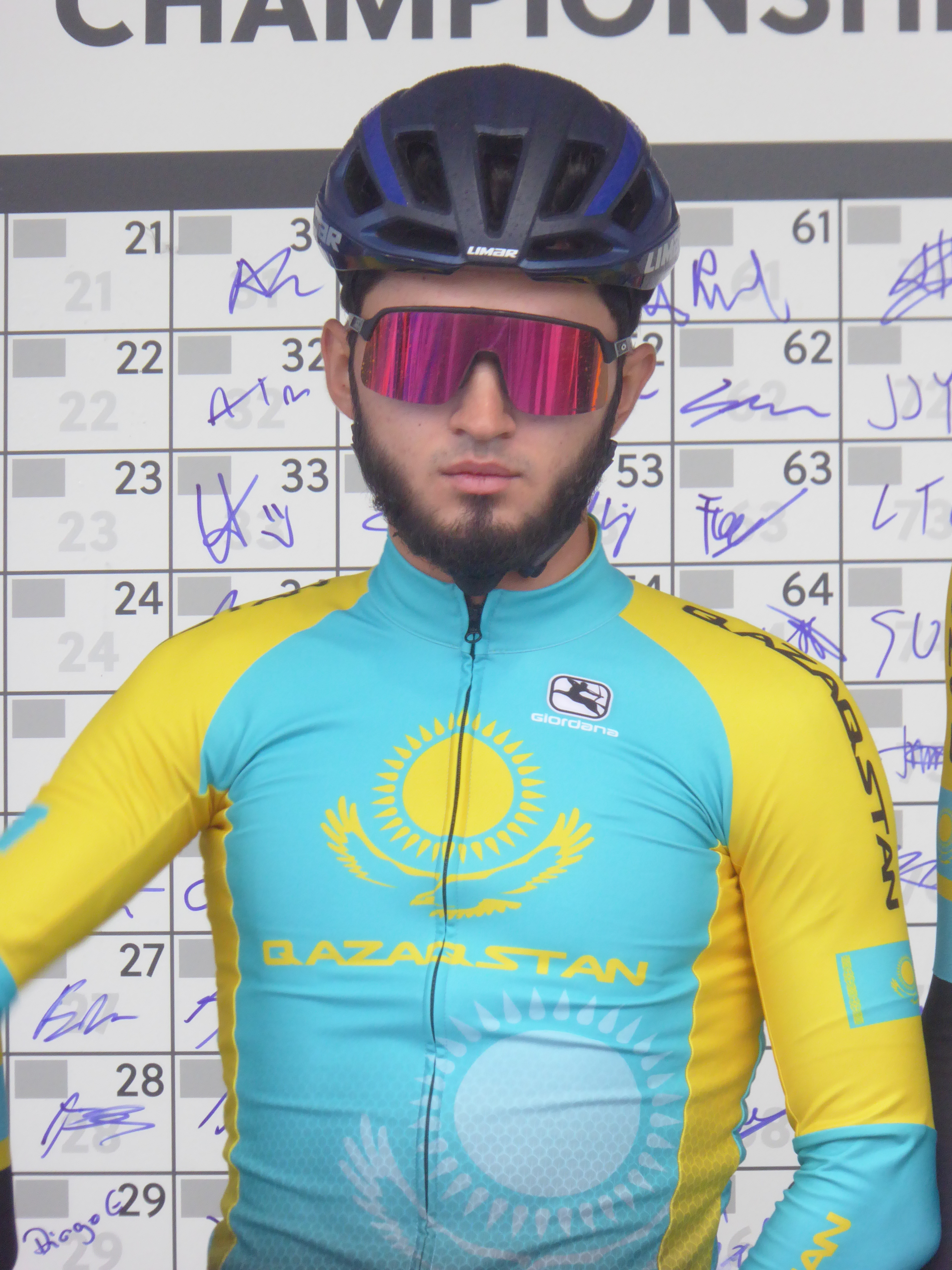
- Dostiyev in 2023

Personal information
- Born: 8 July 2002 (age 24) Chimkent, Kazakhstan
- Height: 1.75 m (5 ft 9 in)
- Weight: 57 kg (126 lb)

Cycling career
- Sport: Cycling
- Discipline: Road
- Role: Rider

Professional teams
- 2021–2023: Vino–Astana Motors
- 2024: Astana Qazaqstan Development Team

Ilkhan Dostiyev (born 8 July 2002 in Chimkent, Kazakhstan) is a Kazakh cyclist, who last rode for UCI Continental team XDS Astana Development Team.

== Career ==
In 2019, Dostiyev finished third in the final stage of the Tour de DMZ, a round of the UCI Junior Nations' Cup. He joined the continental team Vino-Astana Motors in 2021. With this team, he became the Kazakhstan Under-23 Road Race Championships vice-champion in 2022.

In the 2023 season, he won a race in Uzbekistan included in the 2023 UCI Asia Tour. Following his performances, he joined the Astana Qazaqstan Development Team as a reserve rider for the Astana Qazaqstan Team team in 2024. A strong climber, he finished second in the Tour of Rwanda · . He also won a stage at the Orlen Nations Grand Prix and the Giro della Valle d'Aosta, finishing second in the general classification. Later in 2024 he won the general classification of the Tour of Romania

Dostiyev was suspended and had his contract terminated after admitting to using a banned substance following an anti-doping rule violation in July 2024.

== Major results ==
2022
2nd Road race, National Under-23 Road Championships
2023
1st Tour of Bostonliq II
5th The Tour Oqtosh - Chorvoq - Mountain
8th Tour of Bostonliq I
9th Overall Aziz Shusha
2024
1st Overall Tour of Romania

1st Mountains classification
1st Young rider classification

2nd Overall Tour of Rwanda
2nd Overall Giro della Valle d'Aosta

1st Points classification
1st Stage 1

7th Overall Orlen Nations Grand Prix

1st Stage 5
