= Keyi Look Cycling Team =

Team information
- UCI code: KYL
- Registered: China
- Founded: 2016
- Discipline: Road
- Status: UCI Continental (2016–2017)

Key personnel
- General manager: Han Feng

Team name history
- 2016 2017: Hy Sport–Look Continental; Keyi Look Cycling Team

Keyi Look Cycling Team is a Chinese UCI Continental cycling team established in 2016.

== 2017 Team roster ==
Rider	Date of birth
Maxat Ayazbayev (KAZ)	27 January 1992 (aged 25)
Chai Weipeng (CHN)	5 February 1994 (aged 23)
Daniel Dominguez Barragan (ESP)	16 June 1985 (aged 32)
Hou Weijie (CHN)	2 August 1996 (aged 21)
Huang En (CHN)	23 November 1988 (aged 29)
Liang Guohui (CHN)	4 February 1996 (aged 21)
Liu Xinyang (CHN)	21 March 1992 (aged 25)
Bieken Nazaerbieke (CHN)	15 May 1994 (aged 23)

Rider	Date of birth
Viktor Okishev (KAZ)	4 February 1994 (aged 23)
Dmitriy Rive (KAZ)	19 April 1995 (aged 22)
Miras Torekhanov (KAZ)	30 June 1996 (aged 21)
Islam Usmanov (KAZ)	25 May 1997 (aged 20)
Wang Xin (CHN)	26 October 1992 (aged 25)
Yang Siyu (CHN)	21 June 1993 (aged 24)
Yuan Shangguo (CHN)	10 March 1994 (aged 23)
Zhang Shijin (CHN)	17 February 1996 (aged 21)
