= Artur Fedosseyev =

Kazakh cyclist

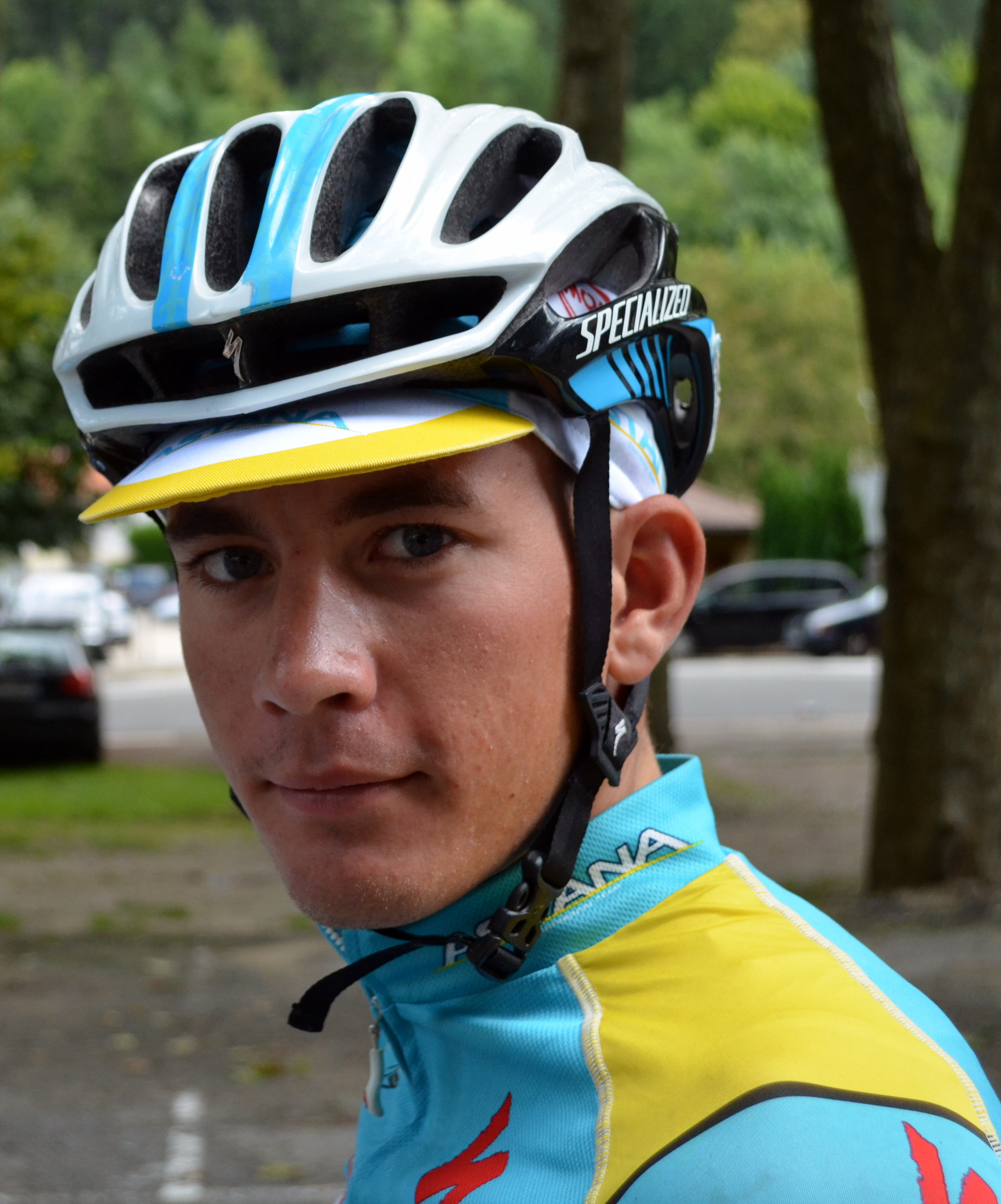
- Fedosseyev in 2014.

Personal information
- Full name: Artur Vitalyevich Fedosseyev; Russian: Артур Витальевич Федосеев
- Born: 29 January 1994 (age 32) Semipalatinsk, Kazakhstan
- Height: 176 cm (5 ft 9 in)
- Weight: 61.5 kg (136 lb)

Cycling career
- Sport: Cycling
- Current team: Retired
- Discipline: Road
- Role: Rider
- Rider type: Climber

Amateur team
- 2011–2012: National team

Professional teams
- 2013–2014: Continental Team Astana
- 2017: RTS–Monton Racing Team
- 2018: Apple Team
- 2018–2019: Beijing XDS–Innova Cycling Team
- 2020: Ningxia Sports Lottery Continental Team
Medal record
Men's mountain bike racing
Representing Kazakhstan
Asian Championships
Silver medal – second place	2012 Lebanon	Junior cross-country

Artur Vitalyevich Fedosseyev (Russian: Артур Витальевич Федосеев; born 29 January 1994 in Semipalatinsk) is a Kazakh former professional cyclist, who most recently rode for UCI Continental team Ningxia Sports Lottery Continental Team.

In 2014, he was suspended for 2 years after testing positive for Anabolic steroids. This led to the removal of all his results from 2014 including second place in Trofeo Internazionale Bastianelli. After returning from suspension he won his first professional victory in 2019 at the Tour of Fuzhou.

== Major results ==
2012
1st Road race, National Junior Road Championships
1st Cross-country, National Junior Mountain Bike Championships
2nd Cross-country, Asian Junior Mountain Bike Championships
2013
8th Overall Tour of Azerbaijan (Iran)
2014
~~2nd Trofeo Internazionale Bastianelli~~
2018
7th Overall Tour of Cartier

1st Mountains classification

2019
1st Overall Tour of Fuzhou

1st Mountains classification
