= Alexander Zozulya =

Kazakhstani ice hockey player

- Born: 8 October 1993 (age 31); Astana, KAZ
- Height: 1.71 m (5 ft 7 in)
- Weight: 74 kg (163 lb; 11 st 9 lb)
- Position: Forward
- Shoots: Right
- KAZ team: Arystan Temirtau
- Playing career: 2009–present

Alexander Zozulya (born 8 October 1993 in Astana) is a Kazakhstani professional ice hockey player currently playing for Arystan Temirtau in the Kazakhstan Hockey Championship league.
