= Igor Chzhan =

Kazakh cyclist

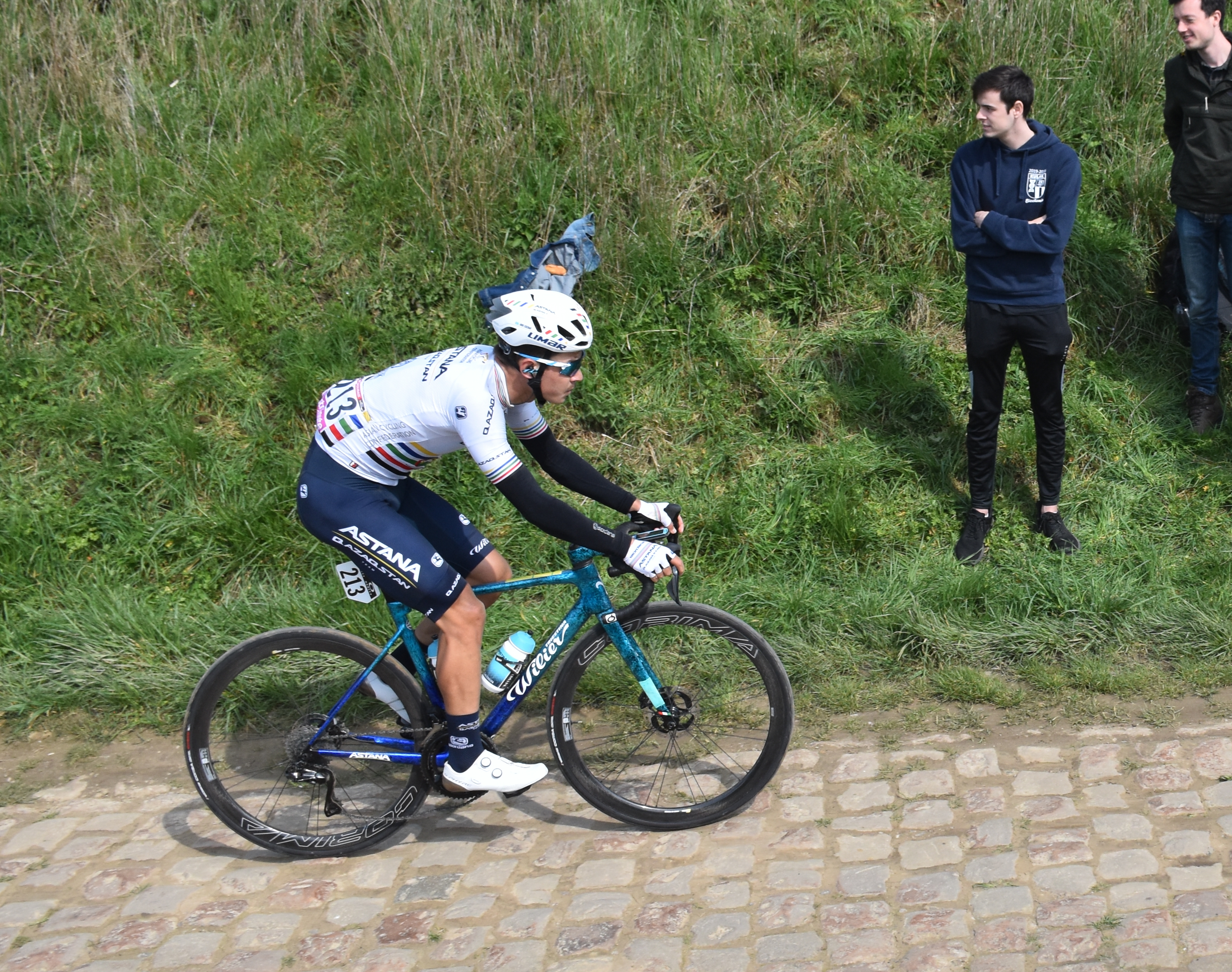
- Chzhan at the 2023 Paris–Roubaix

Personal information
- Full name: Igor Chzhan
- Born: 2 October 1999 (age 27) Taldykorgan, Kazakhstan
- Height: 1.85 m (6 ft 1 in)
- Weight: 71 kg (157 lb)

Cycling career
- Sport: Cycling
- Current team: XDS Astana Team
- Discipline: Road
- Role: Rider

Amateur teams
- 2018: World Cycling Centre
- 2018: Astana City (stagiaire)

Professional teams
- 2019: Astana City
- 2019–2022: Vino–Astana Motors
- 2022: Astana Qazaqstan Team (stagiaire)
- 2023–: Astana Qazaqstan Team

Major wins
- One-day races and Classics Asian Road Race Championships (2022)
Medal record
Representing Kazakhstan
Men's road bicycle racing
Asian Championships
Gold medal – first place	2017 Manama	Junior time trial
Gold medal – first place	2022 Dushanbe	Road race
Gold medal – first place	2022 Dushanbe	Team time trial
Gold medal – first place	2024 Almaty	Mixed team relay
Silver medal – second place	2017 Manama	Junior road race

Igor Chzhan (born 2 October 1999) is a Kazakh cyclist, who currently rides for UCI WorldTeam XDS Astana Team.

== Major results ==
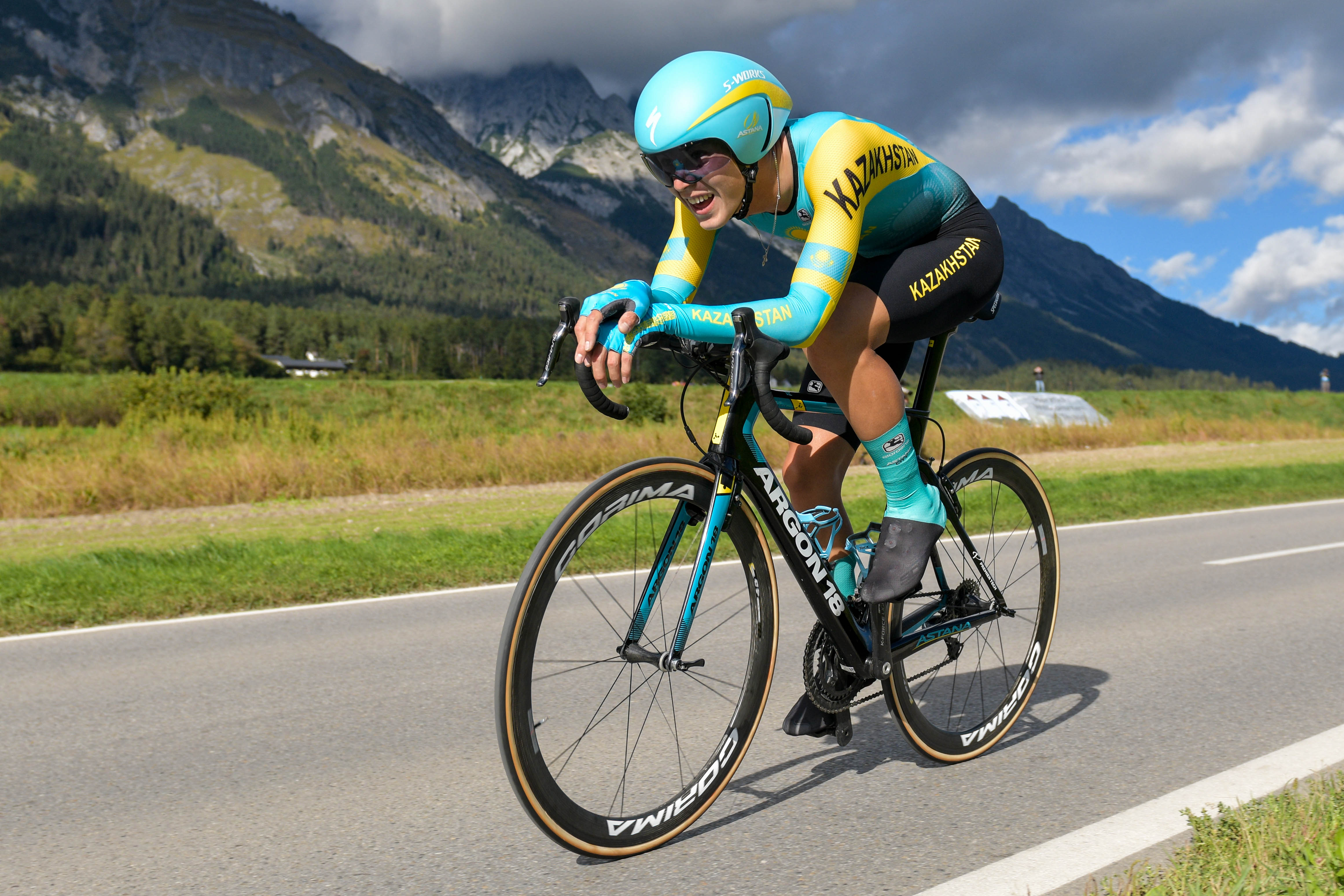
Chzhan at the 2018 UCI Road World Championships

2016
3rd Road race, National Junior Road Championships
2017
Asian Junior Road Championships

1st Time trial
2nd Road race

1st Overall Tour de DMZ

1st Stage 3

2nd Time trial, National Junior Road Championships
5th Time trial, UCI Junior Road World Championships
5th Overall Trophée Centre Morbihan
2018
2nd Time trial, National Road Championships
2019
1st Stage 4 Tour of Iran (Azerbaijan)
2nd Overall Tour of Peninsular
2022
Asian Road Championships

1st Road race
1st Team time trial

1st Grand Prix Velo Alanya
2nd Time trial, National Road Championships
3rd Overall Tour of Sakarya
6th Grand Prix Gündoğmuş
7th Grand Prix Mediterranean
8th Grand Prix Velo Manavgat
2024
2nd Time trial, National Road Championships
