= Yevgeniy Nepomnyachshiy =

Kazakh road bicycle racer

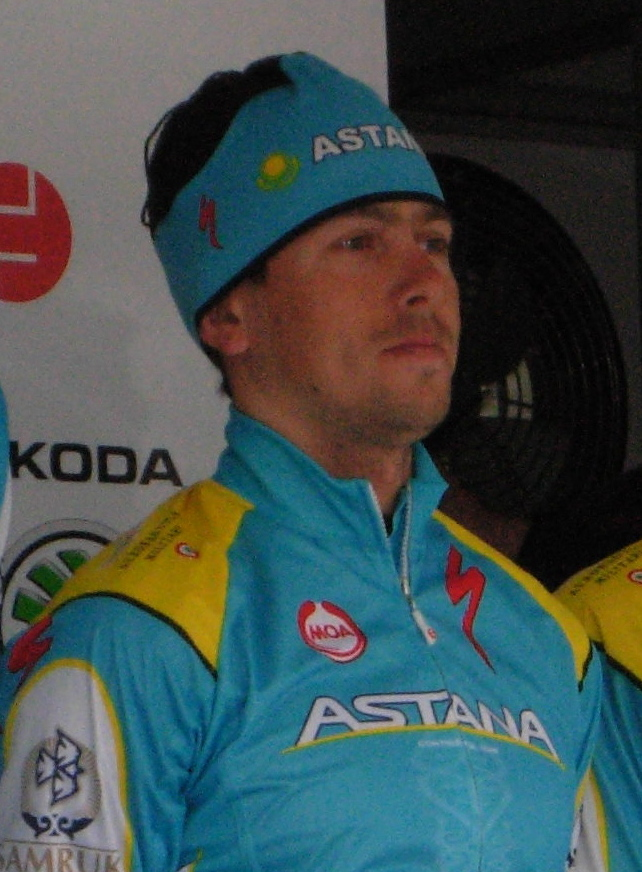

Personal information
- Full name: Yevgeniy Nepomnyachshiy
- Nickname: Nepo
- Born: 12 March 1987 (age 39): Petropavl, Kazakh SSR, Soviet Union; (now Kazakhstan)
- Height: 1.74 m (5 ft 8 1/2 in)
- Weight: 62 kg (137 lb)

Cycling career
- Sport: Cycling
- Current team: Team Vino–North Qazaqstan Region
- Discipline: Road
- Role: Rider (retired); Directeur sportif

Professional teams
- 2010–2012: Astana
- 2013: Continental Team Astana
- 2017–2018: Vino–Astana Motors

Managerial team
- 2019–: Vino–Astana Motors

Yevgeniy Nepomnyachshiy (born 12 March 1987 in Petropavl) is a Kazakhstani former professional road bicycle racer, who now works as a directeur sportif for UCI Continental team Team Vino–North Qazaqstan Region. Nepomnyachshiy previously spent three years with the Astana World Tour team.

== Major results ==
2009
7th Road race, UCI Under-23 Road World Championships
8th Overall Tour of Bulgaria
2010
4th Road race, National Road Championships
2011
5th Time trial, National Road Championships
10th Coppa Bernocchi
2013
2nd Overall Tour of Qinghai Lake

1st Stage 7

2017
6th Overall Tour of Iran (Azerbaijan)
2018
6th Overall Sri Lanka T-Cup

1st Stage 2
