= Galym Akhmetov =

Kazakh cyclist (born 1995)

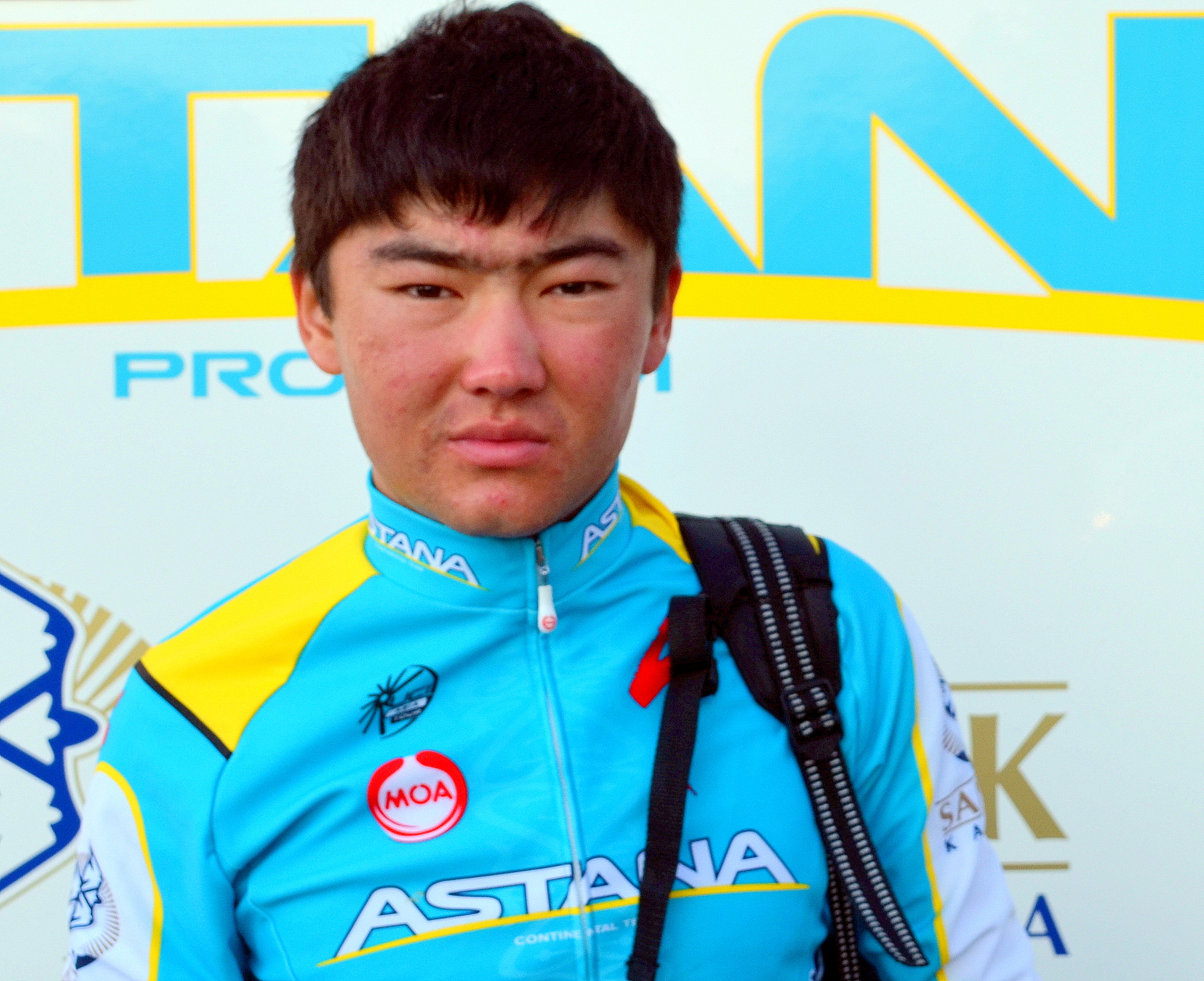
- Galym Akhmetov at the 2014 Tour de l'Ain

Personal information
- Born: 20 March 1995 (age 31) Tashkent, Soviet Union

Cycling career
- Sport: Cycling
- Current team: Astana City
- Discipline: Road
- Role: Rider

Professional team
- 2014–: Continental Team Astana

Galym Akhmetov (Kazakh: Ғалым Ахметов; born 20 March 1995) is a Kazakh cyclist riding for Astana City.

== Major results ==
2016
10th Overall Tour de Gironde
2017
3rd Overall Tour of Mersin
3rd GP Capodarco
2018
1st Overall Tour of Fatih Sultan Mehmet

1st Stage 1
