= Nikita Panassenko =

Kazakhstani cyclist (born 1992)

Personal information
- Born: 18 March 1992 (age 34)
- Height: 1.70 m (5 ft 7 in)
- Weight: 69 kg (152 lb)

Cycling career
- Sport: Cycling
- Current team: Retired
- Disciplines: Track, road
- Role: Rider

Professional teams
- 2014–2017: Continental Team Astana
- 2019: Apple Team
Medal record
Men's track cycling
Representing Kazakhstan
Asian Championships
Bronze medal – third place	2016 Izu	Madison

Nikita Alekseyevich Panassenko (Russian: Никита Алексеевич Панасенко; born 18 March 1992) is a Kazakhstani former professional cyclist. He won the bronze medal in the madison at the 2016 Asian Cycling Championships.

== Major results ==
2011
6th Dwars door de Antwerpse Kempen
2012
5th Overall Tour of East Java
2015
1st Stage 4 Tour of Bulgaria
10th Minsk Cup
2017
9th Overall Tour of China I
