= Nurbolat Kulimbetov =

Kazakh cyclist (born 1992)

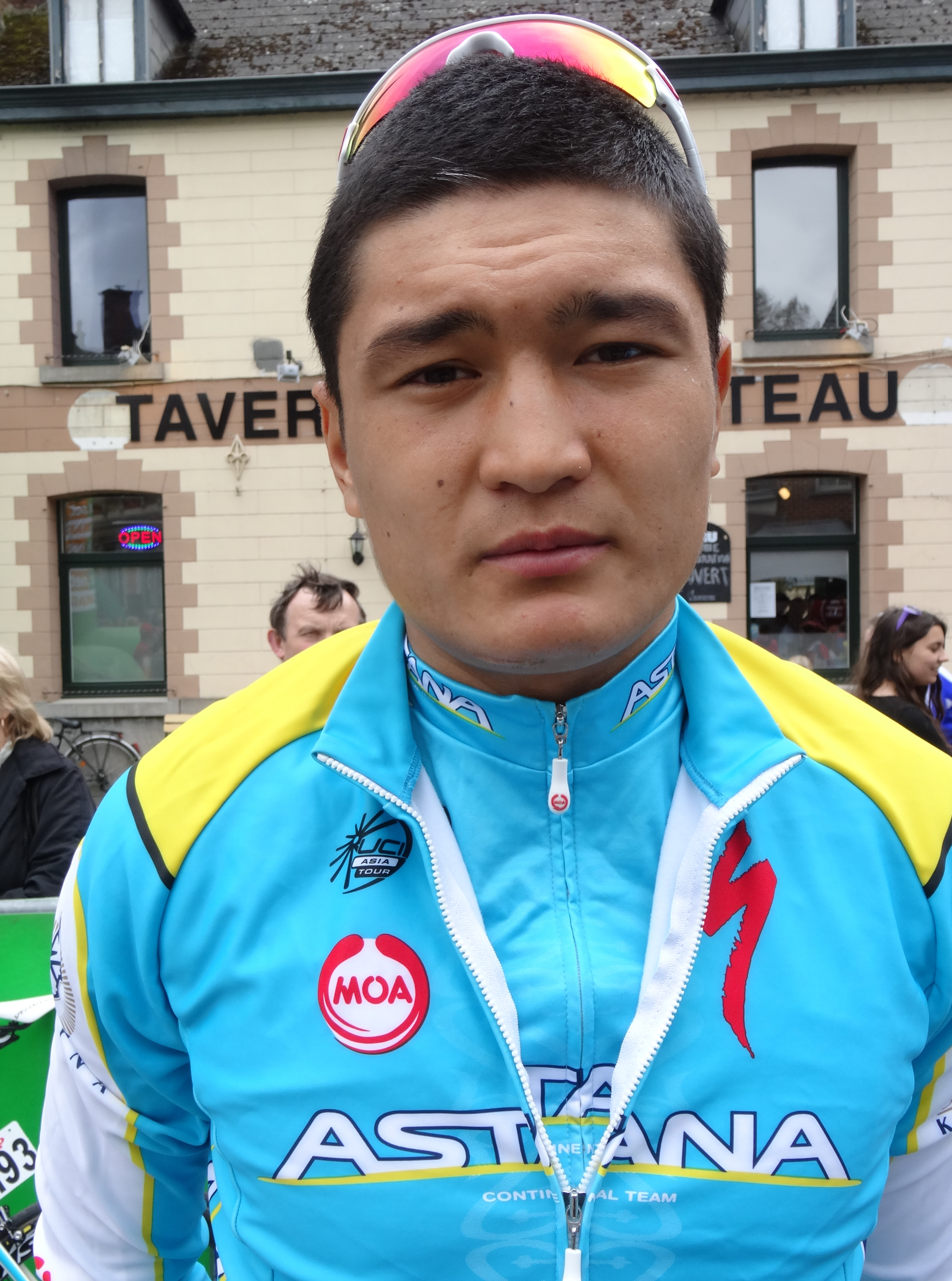
- Kulimbetov at the 2014 Le Triptyque des Monts et Châteaux

Personal information
- Full name: Nurbolat Kulimbetov
- Born: 9 May 1992 (age 34) Taraz, Kazakhstan

Cycling career
- Sport: Cycling
- Current team: Retired
- Discipline: Road
- Role: Rider

Professional teams
- 2012–2017: Continental Team Astana
- 2016: Astana (stagiaire)

Nurbolat Kulimbetov (born 9 May 1992) is a Kazakh former professional cyclist.

== Major results ==
2012
1st Stage 5 Heydar Aliyev Anniversary Tour
2013
2nd Road race, Asian Under-23 Road Championships
2014
Vuelta a la Independencia Nacional

1st Points classification
1st Stage 7

3rd Road race, National Road Championships
2015
1st Stage 4 Bałtyk–Karkonosze Tour
3rd Minsk Cup
9th Overall Dookoła Mazowsza
2016
1st Grand Prix of ISD
2nd Grand Prix of Vinnytsia
5th Race Horizon Park Classic
8th Overall Tour of Ukraine
