= Vadim Pronskiy =

Kazakh cyclist (born 1998)

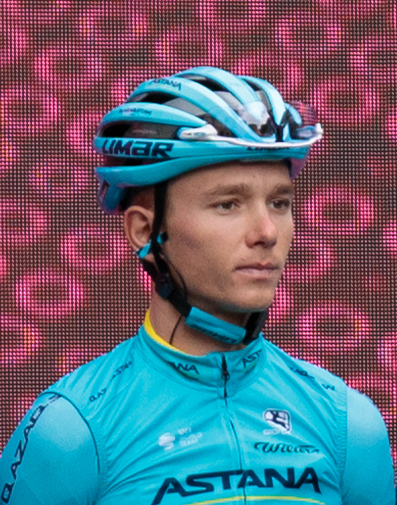
- Pronskiy at the 2023 Giro d'Italia

Personal information
- Born: 4 June 1998 (age 28): Astana, Kazakhstan

Cycling career
- Sport: Cycling
- Current team: Terengganu Cycling Team
- Discipline: Road
- Role: Rider

Professional teams
- 2017–2018: Astana City
- 2019: Vino–Astana Motors
- 2019: Astana (stagiaire)
- 2020–2024: Astana
- 2025–: Terengganu Cycling Team

Vadim Denisovich Pronskiy (Вадим Денисович Пронский, born 4 June 1998) is a Kazakh cyclist, who currently rides for Terengganu Cycling Team.

In August 2019, Pronskiy joined UCI WorldTeam Astana as a stagiaire for the second half of the season, from Vino–Astana Motors. He joined the team permanently from the 2020 season onwards. He rode for Astana Qazaqstan Team until the end of 2024.

== Major results ==
2015
2nd Trofeo Dorigo Porte
2nd Time trial, National Junior Road Championships
2016
1st Time trial, Asian Junior Road Championships
National Junior Road Championships

1st Road race
1st Time trial

1st Stage 2 Giro della Lunigiana
1st Mountains classification Giro di Basilicata
4th Overall Tour du Pays de Vaud
4th Overall Peace Race Juniors
2017
1st Young rider classification Giro della Valle d'Aosta
2nd Overall Bałtyk–Karkonosze Tour

1st Young rider classification
1st Stage 5

2018
1st Overall Giro della Valle d'Aosta

1st Points classification
1st Stage 4

6th Overall Tour Alsace
2019
1st Young rider classification CRO Race
1st Young rider classification Tour of Austria
2nd Overall Tour de Guadeloupe

1st Young rider classification

3rd Overall Tour de Langkawi
7th Overall Tour de l'Ain

1st Young rider classification

2021
3rd Overall Adriatica Ionica Race

1st Young rider classification

2022
3rd Overall Adriatica Ionica Race
2023
5th Overall Tour de Langkawi
2025
8th Overall Tour de Kumano
2026 (2 pro wins)
1st Overall Tour of Thailand

1st Mountains classification
1st Stage 3

4th Grand Prix Pedalia
9th Overall Tour of Sharjah

=== Grand Tour general classification results timeline ===
Grand Tour	2021	2022	2023	2024
Giro d'Italia	40	29	43	DNF
Tour de France	—	—	—	—
Vuelta a España	—	38	91	—

Legend
—	Did not compete
DNF	Did not finish
IP	Race in Progress
