= Grigoriy Shtein =

Kazakhstani cyclist

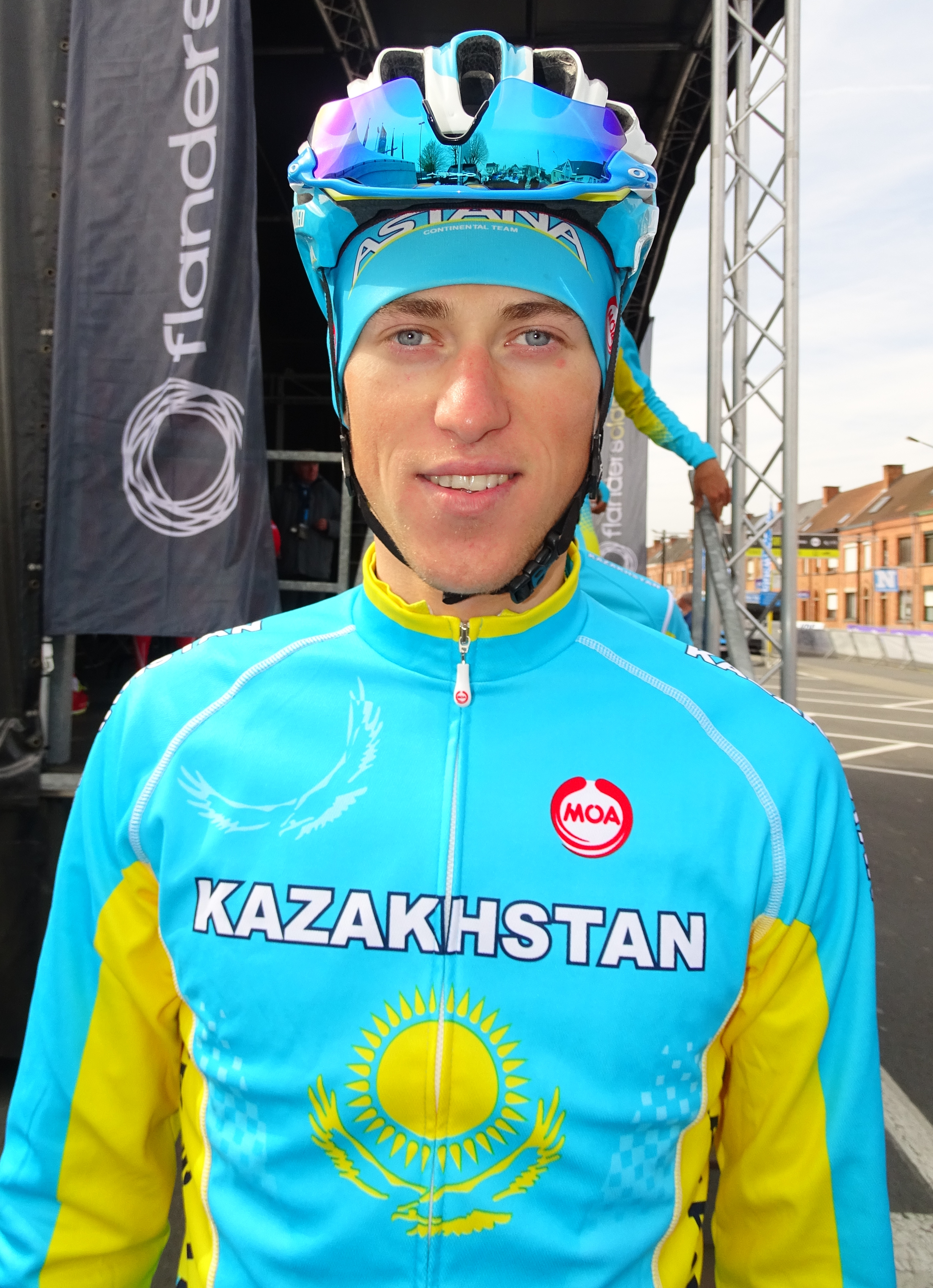
- Shtein in 2016

Personal information
- Full name: Grigoriy Shtein
- Born: 6 March 1996 (age 30) Astana, Kazakhstan

Cycling career
- Sport: Cycling
- Discipline: Road
- Role: Rider

Professional teams
- 2015–2018: Seven Rivers Cycling Team
- 2019–2021: Vino–Astana Motors

Grigoriy Shtein (born 6 March 1996 in Astana) is a Kazakh cyclist, who last rode UCI Continental team Vino–Astana Motors.

== Major results ==
2014
1st Road race, Asian Junior Road Championships
1st Road race, National Junior Road Championships
2016
2nd Gran Premio della Liberazione
2017
1st Stage 6 Bałtyk–Karkonosze Tour
3rd Road race, National Road Championships
9th Overall CCC Tour – Grody Piastowskie
2021
5th Road race, National Road Championships
