= Nurbergen Nurlykhassym =

Kazakh cyclist

Personal information
- Born: 25 March 2000 (age 26) Nur-Sultan, Kazakhstan
- Height: 1.80 m (5 ft 11 in)
- Weight: 65 kg (143 lb)

Cycling career
- Sport: Cycling
- Current team: Retired
- Discipline: Road
- Role: Rider

Professional teams
- 2019: Astana City
- 2021: Vino–Astana Motors.
- 2022–2023: Astana Qazaqstan Team

Nurbergen Nurlykhassym (Kazakh: Нұрберген Нұрлыхасым, Nūrbergen Nūrlyhasym; born 25 March 2000) is a Kazakh former professional road cyclist, who spent two seasons with UCI WorldTeam Astana Qazaqstan Team.

== Major results ==
2017
2nd Road race, National Junior Road Championships
9th Overall Tour de DMZ
2018
3rd Road race, National Junior Road Championships
2021
1st Road race, National Under-23 Road Championships
2022
4th Road race, National Road Championships
