= Grand Prix of ISD =

Ukrainian one-day road cycling race

Race details
- Date: June
- Region: Vinnytsia Oblast
- Discipline: Road
- Competition: UCI Europe Tour
- Type: One-day race

History
- First edition: 2015
- Editions: 2
- Final edition: 2016
- First winner: Andriy Khripta (UKR)
- Most wins: No repeat winners
- Final winner: Nurbolat Kulimbetov (KAZ)

The Grand Prix of ISD was a one-day road cycling race held in Ukraine in 2015 and 2016, as part of the UCI Europe Tour as a category 1.2 race.

== Winners ==
Year	Country	Rider	Team
2015	Ukraine	Andriy Khripta	Kyiv Capital Racing
2016	Kazakhstan	Nurbolat Kulimbetov	Astana City
