= Grand Prix Velo Manavgat =

Race details
- Date: March
- Region: Manavgat, Turkey
- Discipline: Road
- Competition: UCI Europe Tour
- Type: One-day race
- Web site: gpside.veloalanya.com

History
- First edition: 2018
- Editions: 3 (as of 2021)
- First winner: Stepan Astafyev (KAZ) (men); Hanna Tserakh (BLR) (women)
- Most wins: No repeat winners
- Most recent: Harrif Saleh (MAS) (men); Tatsiana Sharakova (BLR) (women)

The Grand Prix Velo Manavgat, formerly known as the Grand Prix Manavgat–Side, is a one-day road cycling race held annually since 2018. It is part of UCI Europe Tour in category 1.2. A women's edition has also been held since 2020.

== Winners ==
=== Men ===
Year	Country	Rider	Team
2018	Kazakhstan	Stepan Astafyev	Vino–Astana Motors
2020	Poland	Alan Banaszek	Mazowsze Serce Polski
2021	Malaysia	Harrif Saleh	Terengganu Cycling Team

=== Women ===
Year	Country	Rider	Team
2020	Belarus	Hanna Tserakh	Minsk Cycling Club
2021	Belarus	Tatsiana Sharakova	Minsk Cycling Club
