= Arman Kamyshev =

Kazakhstani cyclist (born 1991)

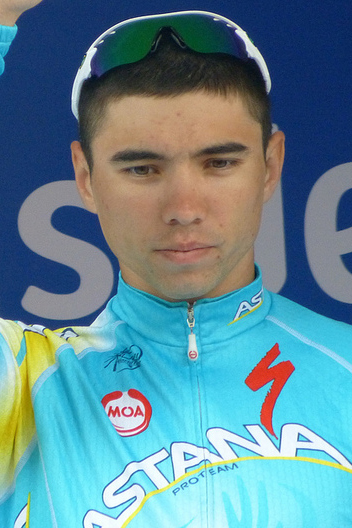
- Kamyshev at the 2013 Four Days of Dunkirk

Personal information
- Full name: Arman Gabidoullovitch Kamyshev; Russian: Арман Габидуллович Камышев
- Born: 14 March 1991 (age 35) Astana, Kazakhstan
- Height: 1.82 m (6 ft 0 in)
- Weight: 67 kg (148 lb)

Cycling career
- Sport: Cycling
- Discipline: Road
- Role: Rider

Professional teams
- 2012: Continental Team Astana
- 2013–2017: Astana
- 2018: Vino–Astana Motors

Major wins
- One-day races and Classics National Road Race Championships (2016)

Arman Gabidoullovitch Kamyshev (Kazakh: Арман Габидуллович Камышев; born 14 March 1991) is a Kazakh road racing cyclist, who last rode for UCI Continental team Vino–Astana Motors.

== Major results ==
2008
1st Stage 4 Tour de l'Abitibi
2010
1st ZLM Tour
3rd Overall Vuelta a la Independencia Nacional
8th Overall Coupe des nations Ville Saguenay
2011
2nd Overall Coupe des nations Ville Saguenay

1st Stage 3

2012
1st Overall Coupe des nations Ville Saguenay

1st Points classification
1st Stages 1 & 3

1st Stage 2 Tour of Bulgaria
1st Stage 1 Giro della Valle d'Aosta
1st Stage 4 Vuelta a la Independencia Nacional
2014
1st Stage 3 Tour of Hainan
2016
1st Road race, National Road Championships
10th Coppa Bernocchi
2018
8th Overall Sri Lanka T-Cup
