= Astana City =

Kazakh cycling team

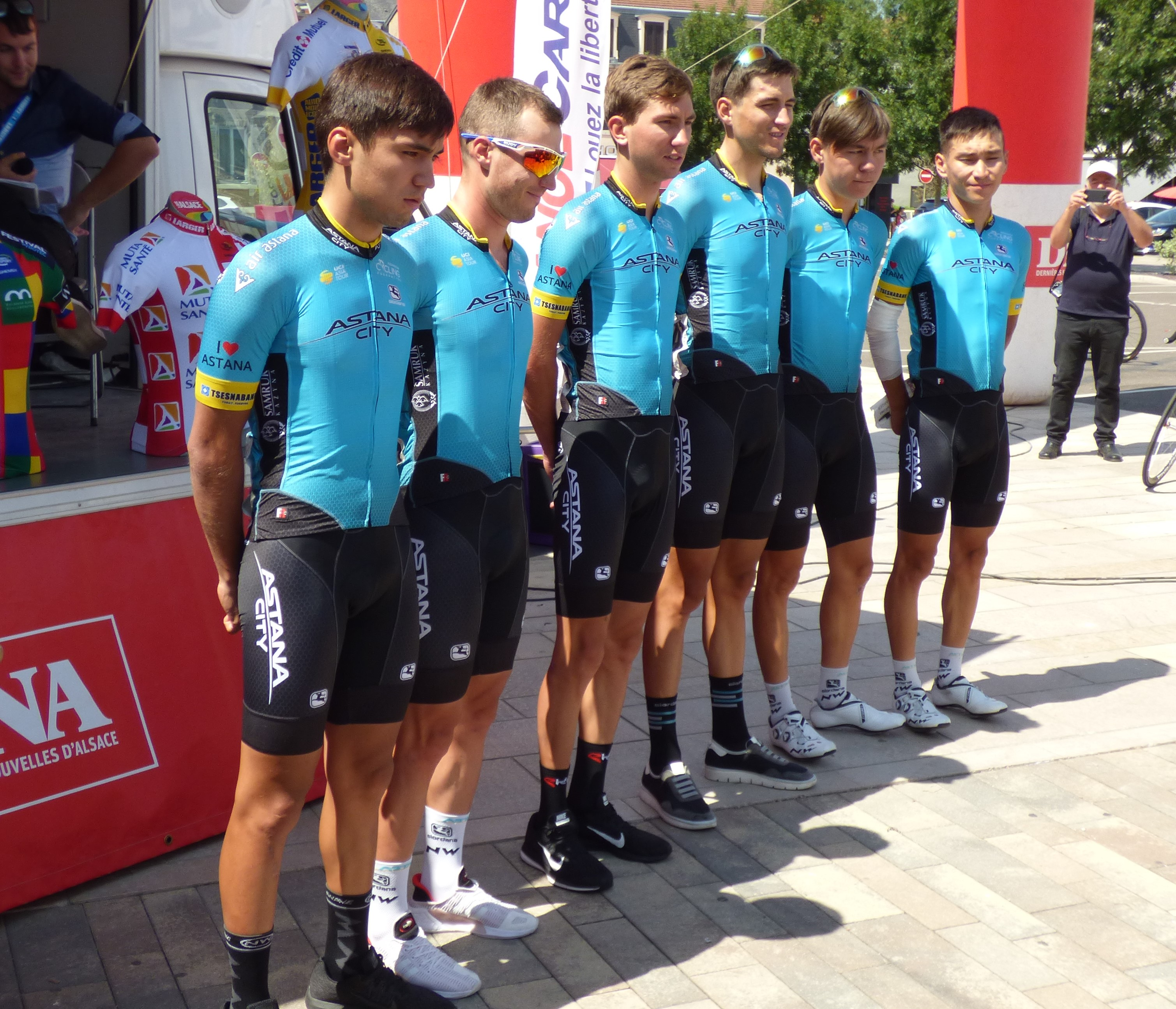

Team information
- UCI code: TSE
- Registered: Kazakhstan
- Founded: 2012
- Disbanded: 2019
- Discipline: Road
- Status: UCI Continental Team
- Bicycles: Specialized

Key personnel
- General manager: Séamus Harford; Alexander Nadobenko

Team name history
- 2012–2014 2015 2016–2019: Continental Team Astana; Seven Rivers Cycling Team; Astana City

Astana City (UCI team code: TSE) was a professional road bicycle racing team sponsored by the Samruk-Kazyna, a coalition of state-owned companies from Kazakhstan and named after its capital city Astana. Astana City acted as a junior feeder team to XDS Astana Team, alongside Vino 4ever SKO. The team disbanded at the end of the 2019 season.

== Team history ==
=== 2014: Three doping positives ===
During the 2014 season three riders, Ilya Davidenok, Victor Okishev and Artur Fedosseyev tested positive for anabolic androgenic steroids. Davidenok tested positive at the Tour de l'Avenir, Okishev tested positive at the Asian Cycling Championships while Fedosseyev tested positive at Tour de l'Ain. The riders were provisionally suspended awaiting doping hearings. The next day Alexander Vinokourov, head of XDS Astana Team, was reported to have suspended the entire continental team.

=== 2015: Seven Rivers ===
In 2015 the team changed name to Seven Rivers Cycling Team. Six of the ten riders had previously ridden for the Continental Team Astana.

=== 2016: Astana City ===
In 2016, the team changed name to Astana City and retained eight riders from Seven Rivers.

== Final roster ==
Rider	Date of birth
Galym Akhmetov (KAZ)	20 March 1995 (aged 23)
Olzhas Bayembayev (KAZ)	22 January 1999 (aged 19)
Igor Chzhan (KAZ)	2 October 1999 (aged 19)
Ramis Dinmukhametov (KAZ)	21 September 2000 (aged 18)
Maxim Gridchin (KAZ)	17 May 2000 (aged 18)
Anton Kuzmin (KAZ)	20 November 1996 (aged 22)

Rider	Date of birth
Sergey Luchshenko (KAZ)	25 June 1994 (aged 24)
Daniil Marukhin (KAZ)	13 February 1999 (aged 19)
Bolat Niyazov (KAZ)	24 February 2000 (aged 18)
Nurbergen Nurlykhassym (KAZ)	25 March 2000 (aged 18)
Dinmukhammed Ulysbayev (KAZ)	21 July 1998 (aged 20)
Ivan Zaitsev (KAZ)	24 February 1999 (aged 19)

== Major wins ==
2012
Stage 2a Vuelta a la Independencia Nacional, Ruslan Tleubayev
Stage 4 Vuelta a la Independencia Nacional, Arman Kamyshev
Stage 2 La Tropicale Amissa Bongo, Nikita Umerbekov
Stage 5 Heydar Aliyev Anniversary Tour, Nikita Umerbekov
Overall Saguenay U23, Arman Kamyshev

Stages 1 & 3, Arman Kamyshev

Sant'Ermete, Ruslan Tleubayev
Stage 3 Baby Giro, Ruslan Tleubayev
Stage 1 Giro della Valle d'Aosta, Arman Kamyshev
Stage 5 Giro della Valle d'Aosta, Alexey Lutsenko
Stage 1 Tour Alsace, Ruslan Tleubayev
Stage 5 Tour de l'Avenir, Alexey Lutsenko
Overall Tour of Bulgaria, Maxat Ayazbayev

Stage 1b, Alexey Lutsenko
Stage 2, Arman Kamyshev

2013
Stage 7 Tour of Qinghai Lake, Evgeniy Nepomnyachshiy
Stage 5 Priirtyshe Stage Race, Ilya Davidenok
Atina, Maxat Ayazbayev
2014
Stage 7 Vuelta a la Independencia Nacional, Nurbolat Kulimbetov
Stage 5 Tour de Normandie, Marco Benfatto
Stage 2 Le Tour de Bretagne Cycliste trophée harmonie Mutuelle, Vadim Galeyev
Stages 2 & 4 Tour of Qinghai Lake, Marco Benfatto
Stage 3 Tour of China II, Vadim Galeyev
2015
Stage 4 Bałtyk–Karkonosze Tour, Nurbolat Kulimbetov
Stage 4 Tour of Bulgaria, Nikita Panassenko
2016
Grand Prix of ISD, Nurbolat Kulimbetov
2017
Stage 5a (ITT) Baltyk–Karkonosze Tour, Vadim Pronskiy
Stage 5b Baltyk–Karkonosze Tour, Grigoriy Shtein
Stage 3 Grand Prix Priessnitz spa, Dinmukhammed Ulysbayev
2018
Overall Tour of Fatih Sultan Mehmet

Stage 1, Galym Akhmetov

Overall Giro Ciclistico della Valle d'Aosta Mont Blanc, Vadim Pronskiy

Stage 4, Vadim Pronskiy

== World, Continental and National champions ==
2012
World U23 Road Race Championships, Alexey Lutsenko
2013
Asian U23 Continental Time Trial Championships, Daniil Fominykh
2014
Asian U23 Continental Time Trial Championships, Viktor Okishev
Kazakhstan National Road Race Championships, Ilya Davidenok

== See also ==
- Astana Pro Team
- Astana BePink Women's Team
- List of Astana City rosters
