= Team Vino–North Qazaqstan Region =

Kazakh cycling team

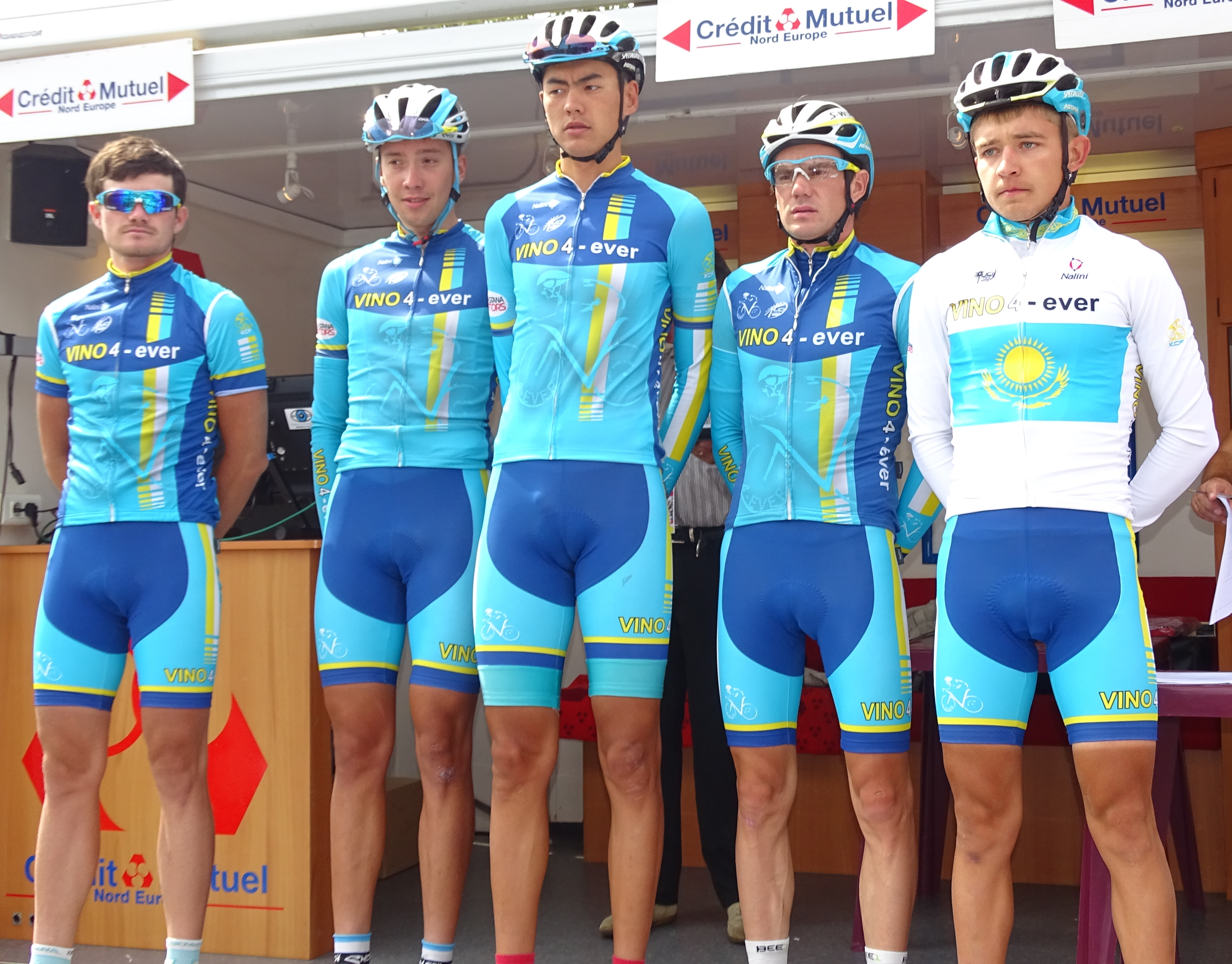

Team information
- UCI code: VSM
- Registered: Kazakhstan
- Founded: 2014
- Discipline: Road
- Status: UCI Continental

Key personnel
- General manager: Venera Gavrilova
- Team managers: Alexandr Shushemoin; Sergey Danniker; Yevgeniy Nepomnyachshiy

Team name history
- 2014–2015 2016 2017–2021 2022–2024 2025–: Vino 4ever Vino 4ever SKO; Vino–Astana Motors; Vino SKO Team; Team Vino–North Qazaqstan Region

Team Vino–North Qazaqstan Region is a Kazakhstani UCI Continental cycling team established in 2014. The name of the team refers to Kazakh cyclist Alexander Vinokourov.

== Team roster ==
As of 3 March 2021.

Rider	Date of birth
Denis Burnashov (KAZ)	16 April 2001 (age 25)
Igor Chzhan (KAZ)	2 October 1999 (age 26)
Ilkhan Dostiyev (KAZ)	8 July 2002 (age 24)
Nurzhan Khatpin (KAZ)	30 May 2001 (age 25)
Daniil Marukhin (KAZ)	13 February 1999 (age 27)
Vladimir Mulagaleyev (KAZ)	17 April 2002 (age 24)
Matvey Nikitin (KAZ)	2 July 1992 (age 34)
Nurbergen Nurlykhassym (KAZ)	25 March 2000 (age 26)

Rider	Date of birth
Alexandr Ovsyannikov (KAZ)	30 May 1997 (age 29)
Daniil Pronskiy (KAZ)	4 June 2000 (age 26)
Igor Romanov (KAZ)	30 October 2002 (age 23)
Alexandr Semenov (KAZ)	8 May 1999 (age 27)
Grigoriy Shtein (KAZ)	6 March 1996 (age 30)
Iogan Shtein (KAZ)	2 June 1999 (age 27)
Kirill Vagner (KAZ)	31 December 2002 (age 23)
Bauyrzhan Zhaparuly (KAZ)	30 July 2002 (age 24)

== Major wins ==
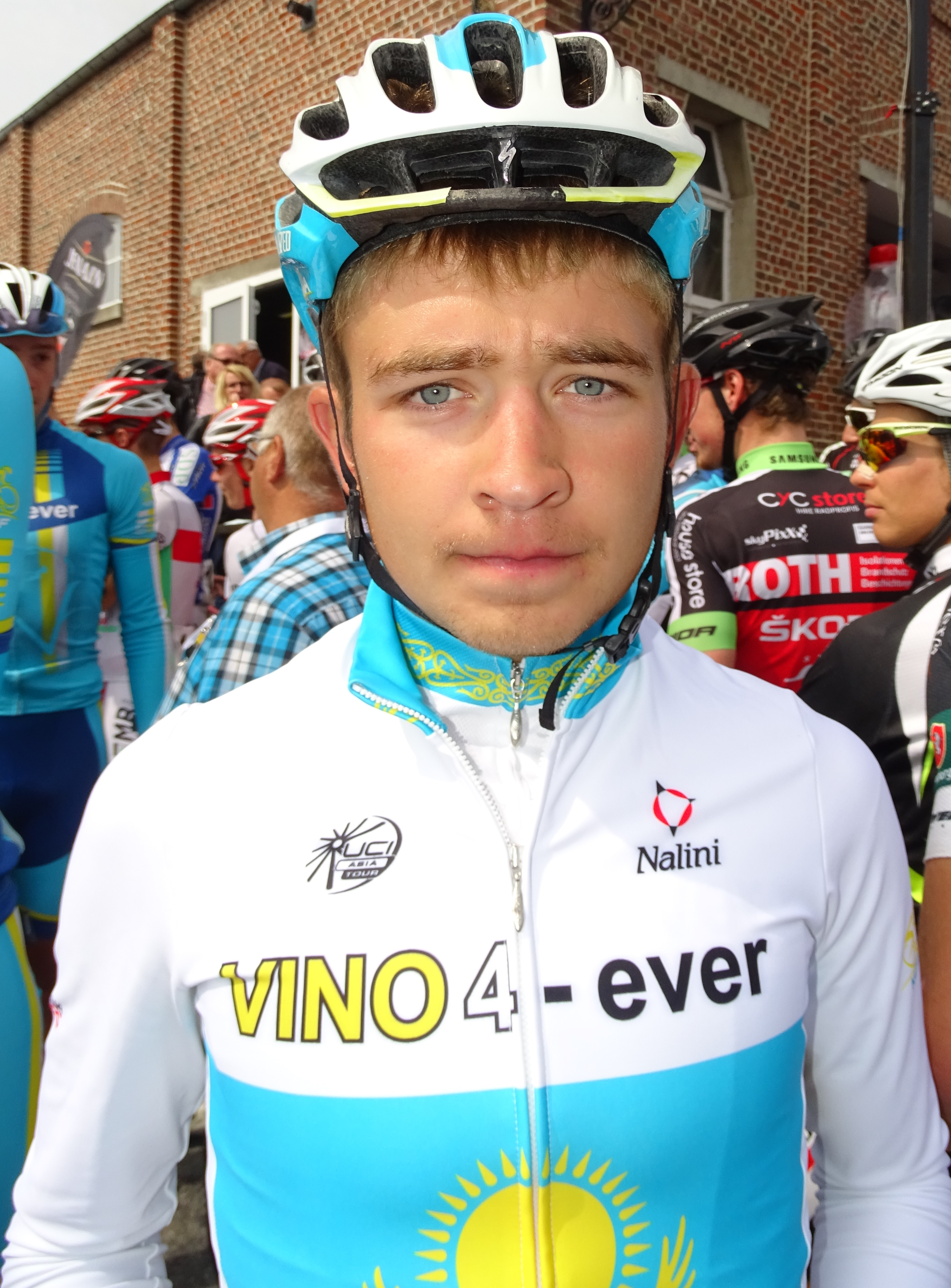
Oleg Zemlyakov won the Kazakhstan National Road Race Championships in 2015.

2015
Kazakhstan National Road Race Championships, Oleg Zemlyakov
Stage 1 Tour of Iran (Azerbaijan), Alexandr Shushemoin
2016
Overall Tour de Filipinas, Oleg Zemlyakov

Stage 2, Oleg Zemlyakov

Stage 2 Tour de Taiwan, Stepan Astafyev
Stage 6 Tour of Iran (Azerbaijan), Yevgeniy Gidich
Stage 6 Tour de Korea, Zhandos Bizhigitov
2017
Overall The Princess Maha Chackri Sirindhorn's Cup 'Tour of Thailand', Yevgeniy Gidich

Stage 1, Yevgeniy Gidich

Prologue Tour of Ukraine, Stepan Astafyev
Stage 13 Tour of Qinghai Lake, Yevgeniy Gidich
Stage 2 Tour of Iran (Azerbaijan), Alexey Voloshin
2018
Grand Prix Side, Stepan Astafyev
Stage 2 Sri Lanka T-Cup, Yevgeniy Nepomnyachshiy
2019
Odessa Grand Prix, Matvey Nikitin
Stage 4 Tour of Iran (Azerbaijan), Igor Chzhan
2020
Grand Prix Velo Alanya, Daniil Pronskiy
Stage 1 Tour de Langkawi, Yevgeniy Fedorov

== National champions ==
2015
Kazakhstan Road Race, Oleg Zemlyakov
