= Almaty Cycling Team =

Kazakh cycling team

Almaty Astana Motors
Team information
- UCI code: AAM
- Registered: Kazakhstan
- Founded: 2018
- Discipline: Road

Key personnel
- General manager: Dossan Mussayev
- Team manager: Daniil Fominykh

Team name history
- 2018–2021 2021–2022 2023–: Apple Team; Almaty Cycling Team; Almaty Astana Motors

Almaty Astana Motors (UCI team code: AAM) is a professional road bicycle racing team from Kazakhstan.

== Team roster ==
As of 21 January 2023.

Rider	Date of birth
Rudolf Remkhi (KAZ)	5 October 2003 (age 22)
Anton Kuzmin (KAZ)	20 November 1996 (age 29)
Ruslan Aliev (KAZ)	7 August 2003 (age 23)
Nikita Bezruchko (KAZ)	1 August 2002 (age 24)
Alexandr Mussabayev (KAZ)	14 January 2004 (age 22)
Igor Yussifov (KAZ)	1 March 2000 (age 26)

Rider	Date of birth
Alisher Zhumakan (KAZ)	17 January 1997 (age 29)
Nikita Shestakov (KAZ)	11 June 2004 (age 22)
Georgiy Shepelev (KAZ)	17 July 2004 (age 22)

== Major wins ==
2022
Grand Prix Velo Alanya, Igor Chzhan
2023
Stage 3 Tour of Sharjah, Rudolf Remkhi
