= 2019 Astana season =

Astana
- 2019 season
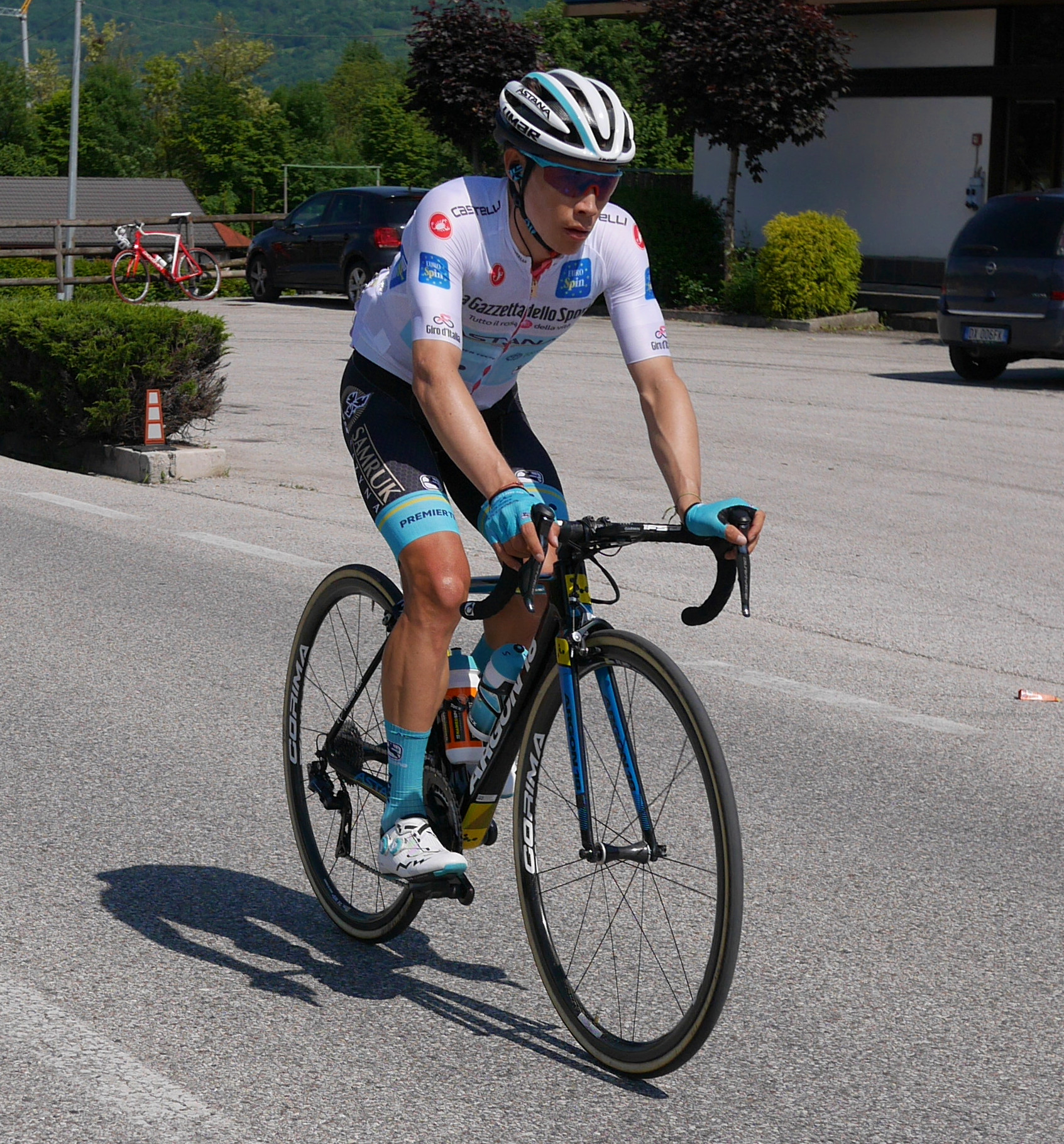
- Miguel Angel Lopez in Stage 19, Giro d'Italia wearing White jersey as the best Young rider
- UCI code: AST
- Status: UCI WorldTeam
- Chairman: Alexander Vinokourov
- Main sponsor(s): Samruk-Kazyna
- Based: Kazakhstan
- Bicycles: Argon 18
- Groupset: Shimano

Season victories
- One-day races: 3
- Stage race overall: 10
- Stage race stages: 20
- National Championships: 2
- Most wins: Alexey Lutsenko
- Best ranked rider: Jakob Fuglsang (3rd)
- Jersey

The 2019 season for the Astana cycling team began in January with the Tour Down Under. As a UCI WorldTeam, they were automatically invited and obligated to send a squad to every event in the UCI World Tour.

== Team roster ==
As of 24 December 2018.

Rider	Date of birth
Davide Ballerini (ITA)	21 September 1994 (aged 24)
Pello Bilbao (ESP)	25 February 1990 (aged 28)
Zhandos Bizhigitov (KAZ)	10 June 1991 (aged 27)
Manuele Boaro (ITA)	12 March 1987 (aged 31)
Hernando Bohórquez (COL)	22 June 1992 (aged 26)
Dario Cataldo (ITA)	17 March 1985 (aged 33)
Rodrigo Contreras (COL)	2 June 1994 (aged 24)
Magnus Cort (DEN)	16 January 1993 (aged 25)
Laurens De Vreese (BEL)	29 September 1988 (aged 30)
Daniil Fominykh (KAZ)	28 August 1991 (aged 27)
Omar Fraile (ESP)	17 July 1990 (aged 28)
Jakob Fuglsang (DEN)	22 March 1985 (aged 33)
Yevgeniy Gidich (KAZ)	19 May 1996 (aged 22)
Jonas Gregaard Wilsly (DEN)	30 July 1996 (aged 22)

Rider	Date of birth
Dmitriy Gruzdev (KAZ)	13 March 1986 (aged 32)
Jan Hirt (CZE)	21 January 1991 (aged 27)
Hugo Houle (CAN)	27 September 1990 (aged 28)
Ion Izagirre (ESP)	4 February 1989 (aged 29)
Gorka Izagirre (ESP)	7 October 1987 (aged 31)
Merhawi Kudus (ERI)	23 January 1994 (aged 24)
Miguel Ángel López (COL)	4 February 1994 (aged 24)
Alexey Lutsenko (KAZ)	7 September 1992 (aged 26)
Yuriy Natarov (KAZ)	28 December 1996 (aged 21)
Luis León Sánchez (ESP)	24 November 1983 (aged 35)
Nikita Stalnov (KAZ)	14 September 1991 (aged 27)
Davide Villella (ITA)	27 June 1991 (aged 27)
Artyom Zakharov (KAZ)	27 October 1991 (aged 27)
Andrey Zeits (KAZ)	14 December 1986 (aged 32)

Riders who joined the team for the 2019 season

Rider	2018 team
Davide Ballerini	Androni Giocattoli–Sidermec
Manuele Boaro	Bahrain–Merida
Hernando Bohórquez	Team Manzana Postobón
Rodrigo Contreras	EPM
Jonas Gregaard Wilsly	Riwal CeramicSpeed
Gorka Izagirre	Bahrain–Merida
Ion Izagirre	Bahrain–Merida
Merhawi Kudus	Team Dimension Data
Yuriy Natarov	Astana City

Riders who left the team during or after the 2018 season

Rider	2019 team
Sergey Chernetskiy	Caja Rural–Seguros RGA
Oscar Gatto	Bora–Hansgrohe
Andriy Hrivko	-
Jesper Hansen	Cofidis
Tanel Kangert	EF Education First
Truls Engen Korsæth	Retires
Bakhtiyar Kozhatayev	-
Riccardo Minali	Israel Cycling Academy
Moreno Moser	Nippo–Vini Fantini–Faizanè
Ruslan Tleubayev	Retires
Michael Valgren	Team Dimension Data

== Season victories ==
Date	Race	Competition	Rider	Country	Location
10 February	Volta a la Comunitat Valenciana, Overall	UCI Europe Tour	Ion Izagirre (ESP)	Spain	
10 February	Volta a la Comunitat Valenciana, Teams classification	UCI Europe Tour	(Note: The riders on the squad were Luis León Sánchez, Pello Bilbao, Hugo Houle, Ion Izagirre, Omar Fraile, Magnus Cort and Merhawi Kudus)	Spain	
15 February	Vuelta a Murcia, Stage 1	UCI Europe Tour	Pello Bilbao (ESP)	Spain	San Javier
16 February	Vuelta a Murcia, Stage 2	UCI Europe Tour	Luis León Sánchez (ESP)	Spain	Murcia
16 February	Vuelta a Murcia, Overall	UCI Europe Tour	Luis León Sánchez (ESP)	Spain	
16 February	Vuelta a Murcia, Points classification	UCI Europe Tour	Luis León Sánchez (ESP)	Spain	
16 February	Vuelta a Murcia, Mountains classification	UCI Europe Tour	Jakob Fuglsang (DEN)	Spain	
16 February	Vuelta a Murcia, Teams classification	UCI Europe Tour	(Note: The riders on the squad were Luis León Sánchez, Pello Bilbao, Dario Cataldo, Omar Fraile, Yuriy Natarov and Jakob Fuglsang)	Spain	
17 February	Tour de la Provence, Overall	UCI Europe Tour	Gorka Izagirre (ESP)	France	
17 February	Tour of Colombia, Overall	UCI America Tour	Miguel Ángel López (COL)	Colombia	
17 February	Tour of Colombia, Young rider classification	UCI America Tour	Miguel Ángel López (COL)	Colombia	
17 February	Tour of Oman, Stage 2	UCI Asia Tour	Alexey Lutsenko (KAZ)	Oman	Al Bustan
18 February	Tour of Oman, Stage 3	UCI Asia Tour	Alexey Lutsenko (KAZ)	Oman	Qurayyat
20 February	Tour of Oman, Stage 5	UCI Asia Tour	Alexey Lutsenko (KAZ)	Oman	Jabal al Akhdhar
21 February	Tour of Oman, Overall	UCI Asia Tour	Alexey Lutsenko (KAZ)	Oman	
21 February	Tour of Oman, Points classification	UCI Asia Tour	Alexey Lutsenko (KAZ)	Oman	
24 February	Vuelta a Andalucía, Overall	UCI Europe Tour	Jakob Fuglsang (DEN)	Spain	
25 February	Tour of Rwanda, Stage 2	UCI Africa Tour	Merhawi Kudus (ERI)	Rwanda	Mount Huye
26 February	Tour of Rwanda, Stage 3	UCI Africa Tour	Merhawi Kudus (ERI)	Rwanda	Rubavu
3 March	Tour of Rwanda, Stage 8	UCI Africa Tour	Rodrigo Contreras (COL)	Rwanda	Kigali
3 March	Tour of Rwanda, Overall	UCI Africa Tour	Merhawi Kudus (ERI)	Rwanda	
13 March	Paris–Nice, Stage 4	UCI World Tour	Magnus Cort Nielsen (DEN)	France	Pélussin
16 March	Tirreno–Adriatico, Stage 4	UCI World Tour	Alexey Lutsenko (KAZ)	Italy	Fossombrone
17 March	Paris–Nice, Stage 8	UCI World Tour	Ion Izagirre (ESP)	France	Nice
17 March	Tirreno–Adriatico, Stage 5	UCI World Tour	Jakob Fuglsang (DEN)	Italy	Recanati
19 March	Tirreno–Adriatico, Mountains classification	UCI World Tour	Alexey Lutsenko (KAZ)	Italy	
28 March	Volta a Catalunya, Stage 4	UCI World Tour	Miguel Ángel López (COL)	Spain	La Molina
31 March	Volta a Catalunya, Overall	UCI World Tour	Miguel Ángel López (COL)	Spain	
31 March	Volta a Catalunya, Young rider classification	UCI World Tour	Miguel Ángel López (COL)	Spain	
13 April	Tour of the Basque Country, Overall	UCI World Tour	Ion Izagirre (ESP)	Spain	
28 April	Liège–Bastogne–Liège	UCI World Tour	Jakob Fuglsang (DEN)	Belgium	Liège
17 May	Giro d'Italia, Stage 7	UCI World Tour	Pello Bilbao (ESP)	Italy	L'Aquila
18 May	Tour of California, Mountains classification	UCI World Tour	Davide Ballerini (ITA)	United States	
26 May	Giro d'Italia, Stage 15	UCI World Tour	Dario Cataldo (ITA)	Italy	Como
1 June	Giro d'Italia, Stage 20	UCI World Tour	Pello Bilbao (ESP)	Italy	Croce d'Aune
2 June	Giro d'Italia, Young rider classification	UCI World Tour	Miguel Ángel López (COL)	Italy	
16 June	Critérium du Dauphiné, Overall	UCI World Tour	Jakob Fuglsang (DEN)	France	
16 June	Critérium du Dauphiné, Teams classification	UCI World Tour	(Note: The riders on the squad were Magnus Cort, Hugo Houle, Davide Ballerini, Gorka Izagirre, Hernando Bohórquez, Alexey Lutsenko and Jakob Fuglsang)	France	
16 June	Tour de Suisse, Stage 2	UCI World Tour	Luis León Sánchez (ESP)	Switzerland	Langnau im Emmental
18 August	Arctic Race of Norway, Overall	UCI Europe Tour	Alexey Lutsenko (KAZ)	Norway	
18 August	Arctic Race of Norway, Points classification	UCI Europe Tour	Alexey Lutsenko (KAZ)	Norway	
18 August	Arctic Race of Norway, Teams classification	UCI Europe Tour	(Note: The riders on the squad were Magnus Cort, Daniil Fominykh, Jonas Gregaard, Hugo Houle, Alexey Lutsenko, and Yuriy Natarov.)	Norway	
24 August	Vuelta a Espana, Stage 1 (TTT)	UCI World Tour	(Note: The riders on the squad were Jakob Fuglsang, Gorka Izagirre, Ion Izagirre, Omar Fraile, Luis León Sánchez, Dario Cataldo, Alexey Lutsenko, and Manuele Boaro.)	Spain	Torrevieja
9 September	Vuelta a Espana, Stage 16	UCI World Tour	Jakob Fuglsang (DEN)	Spain	La Cubilla
19 September	Coppa Sabatini	UCI Europe Tour	Alexey Lutsenko (KAZ)	Italy	Peccioli
21 September	Memorial Marco Pantani	UCI Europe Tour	Alexey Lutsenko (KAZ)	Italy	Cesenatico
3 October	CRO Race, Stage 3	UCI Europe Tour	Yevgeniy Gidich (KAZ)	Croatia	Makarska
6 October	CRO Race, Teams classification	UCI Europe Tour	(Note: The riders on the squad were Yevgeniy Gidich, Andrey Zeits, Vadim Pronskiy, Daniil Fominykh, Yuriy Natarov and Davide Villella)	Croatia	

== National, Continental and World champions 2019 ==
Date	Discipline	Jersey	Rider	Country	Location
25 April	Asian Cycling Championships, ITT		Daniil Fominykh (KAZ)	Uzbekistan	Gazalkent
27 April	Asian Cycling Championships, TTT		(Note: The riders on the squad were Yevgeniy Gidich, Yuriy Natarov, Daniil Fominykh, Zhandos Bizhigitov, Dmitriy Gruzdev)	Uzbekistan	Gazalkent
28 April	Asian Cycling Championships, Road race		Yevgeniy Gidich (KAZ)	Uzbekistan	Gazalkent
26 June	Kazakhstan National Time Trial Championships		Alexey Lutsenko (KAZ)	Kazakhstan	Shchuchinsk
30 June	Kazakhstan National Road Race Championships		Alexey Lutsenko (KAZ)	Kazakhstan	Shchuchinsk
