= 2018 Astana season =

Astana
- 2018 season
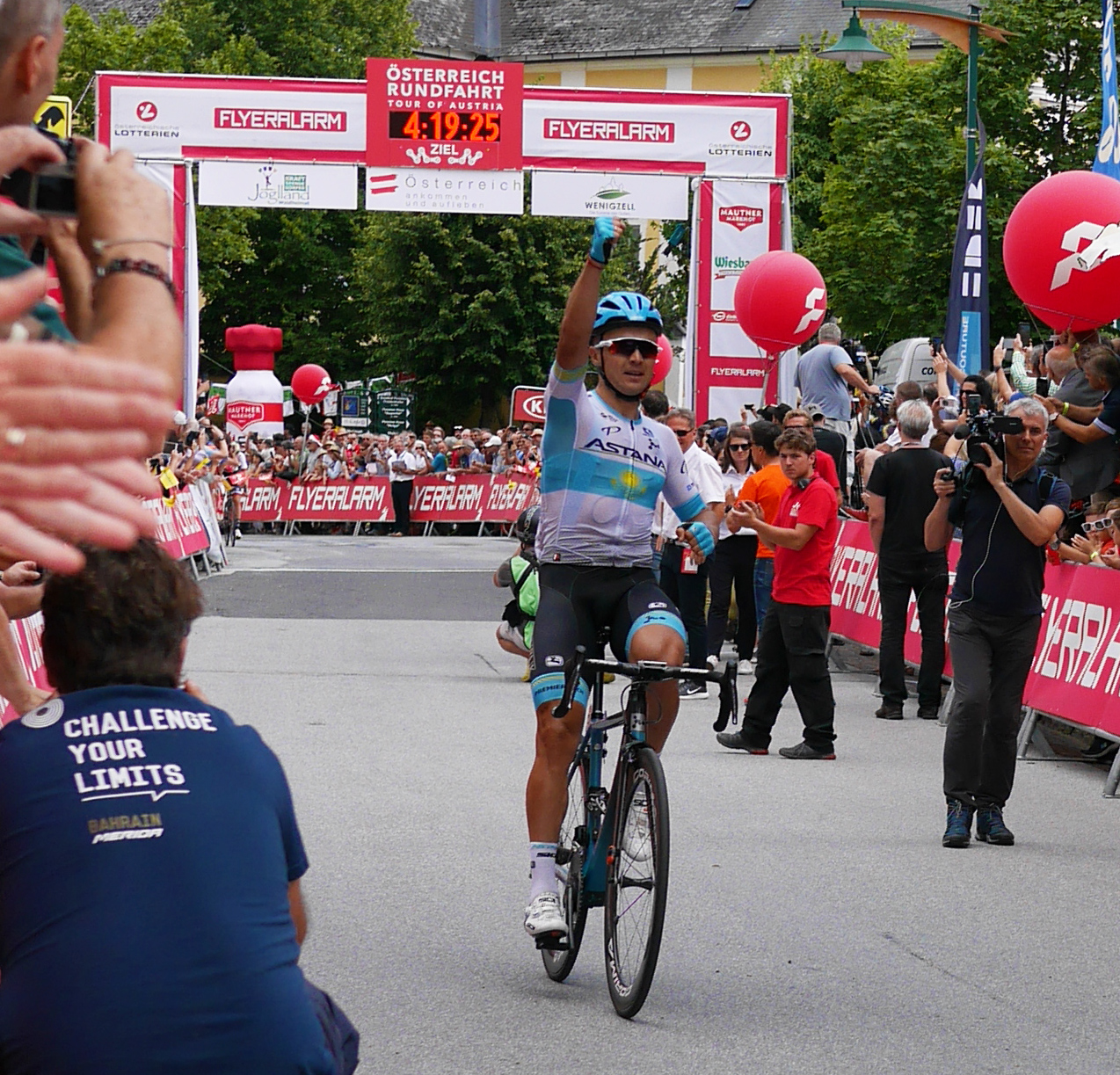
- Alexey Lutsenko winning Stage 6 in 2018 Tour of Austria
- UCI code: AST
- Status: UCI WorldTeam
- World Tour Rank: 6th
- Chairman: Alexander Vinokourov
- Main sponsor(s): Samruk-Kazyna
- Based: Kazakhstan
- Bicycles: Argon 18
- Groupset: Shimano

Season victories
- One-day races: 3
- Stage race overall: 3
- Stage race stages: 19
- National Championships: 4
- Best ranked rider: Miguel Ángel López
- Jersey

The 2018 season for the Astana cycling team began in January with the Tour Down Under. As a UCI WorldTeam, they were automatically invited and obligated to send a squad to every event in the UCI World Tour.

== Team roster ==
As of 7 March 2018.

| Rider | Date of birth |
|---|---|
| Pello Bilbao (ESP) | 25 February 1990 (aged 28) |
| Zhandos Bizhigitov (KAZ) | 10 June 1991 (aged 26) |
| Dario Cataldo (ITA) | 17 March 1985 (aged 32) |
| Sergey Chernetskiy (RUS) | 9 April 1990 (aged 27) |
| Magnus Cort (DEN) | 16 January 1993 (aged 25) |
| Laurens De Vreese (BEL) | 29 September 1988 (aged 29) |
| Daniil Fominykh (KAZ) | 28 August 1991 (aged 26) |
| Omar Fraile (ESP) | 17 July 1990 (aged 27) |
| Jakob Fuglsang (DEN) | 22 March 1985 (aged 32) |
| Oscar Gatto (ITA) | 1 January 1985 (aged 33) |
| Yevgeniy Gidich (KAZ) | 19 May 1996 (aged 21) |
| Dmitriy Gruzdev (KAZ) | 13 March 1986 (aged 31) |
| Jesper Hansen (DEN) | 23 October 1990 (aged 27) |
| Jan Hirt (CZE) | 21 January 1991 (aged 27) |
| Hugo Houle (CAN) | 27 September 1990 (aged 27) |

| Rider | Date of birth |
|---|---|
| Andriy Hrivko (UKR) | 7 August 1983 (aged 34) |
| Tanel Kangert (EST) | 11 March 1987 (aged 30) |
| Truls Korsæth (NOR) | 16 September 1993 (aged 24) |
| Bakhtiyar Kozhatayev (KAZ) | 28 March 1992 (aged 25) |
| Miguel Ángel López (COL) | 4 February 1994 (aged 24) |
| Alexey Lutsenko (KAZ) | 7 September 1992 (aged 25) |
| Riccardo Minali (ITA) | 19 April 1995 (aged 22) |
| Moreno Moser (ITA) | 25 December 1990 (aged 27) |
| Luis León Sánchez (ESP) | 24 November 1983 (aged 34) |
| Nikita Stalnov (KAZ) | 14 September 1991 (aged 26) |
| Ruslan Tleubayev (KAZ) | 7 March 1987 (aged 31) |
| Michael Valgren (DEN) | 7 February 1992 (aged 26) |
| Davide Villella (ITA) | 27 June 1991 (aged 26) |
| Artyom Zakharov (KAZ) | 27 October 1991 (aged 26) |
| Andrey Zeits (KAZ) | 14 December 1986 (aged 31) |

Riders who joined the team for the 2018 season

| Rider | 2017 team |
|---|---|
| Magnus Cort Nielsen | Orica–Scott |
| Omar Fraile | Team Dimension Data |
| Yevgeniy Gidich | neo-pro (Vino 4ever SKO) |
| Jan Hirt | CCC–Sprandi–Polkowice |
| Hugo Houle | AG2R La Mondiale |
| Davide Villella | Cannondale–Drapac |

Riders who left the team during or after the 2017 season

| Rider | 2018 team |
|---|---|
| Fabio Aru | UAE Team Emirates |
| Matti Breschel | EF Education First–Drapac p/b Cannondale |
| Arman Kamyshev | Vino–Astana Motors |
| Paolo Tiralongo | Retired |

== Season victories ==
| Date | Race | Competition | Rider | Country | Location |
|---|---|---|---|---|---|
| 4 February | Volta a la Comunitat Valenciana, Teams classification | UCI Europe Tour | (Note: The riders on the squad were Jakob Fuglsang, Luis León Sánchez, Pello Bilbao, Sergey Chernetskiy, Yevgeniy Gidich, Moreno Moser and Andriy Hrivko) | Spain | |
| 10 February | Vuelta a Murcia | UCI Europe Tour | Luis León Sánchez (ESP) | Spain | Murcia |
| 16 February | Tour of Oman, Stage 4 | UCI Asia Tour | Magnus Cort (DEN) | Oman | Ministry of Tourism |
| 17 February | Tour of Oman, Stage 5 | UCI Asia Tour | Miguel Ángel López (COL) | Oman | Jebel Akhdar |
| 18 February | Tour of Oman, Overall | UCI Asia Tour | Alexey Lutsenko (KAZ) | Oman | |
| 18 February | Tour of Oman, Young rider classification | UCI Asia Tour | Miguel Ángel López (COL) | Oman | |
| 18 February | Tour of Oman, Teams classification | UCI Asia Tour | (Note: The riders on the squad were Miguel Ángel López, Omar Fraile, Jan Hirt, Tanel Kangert, Alexey Lutsenko, Magnus Cort and Nikita Stalnov) | Oman | |
| 24 February | Omloop Het Nieuwsblad | UCI World Tour | Michael Valgren (DEN) | Belgium | |
| 25 February | Abu Dhabi Tour, Young rider classification | UCI World Tour | Miguel Ángel López (COL) | United Arab Emirates | |
| 13 March | Tirreno–Adriatico, Teams classification | UCI World Tour | (Note: The riders on the squad were Miguel Ángel López, Dario Cataldo, Oscar Gatto, Tanel Kangert, Alexey Lutsenko, Andriy Hrivko and Davide Villella) | Italy | |
| 19 March | Tour de Langkawi, Stage 2 | UCI Asia Tour | Riccardo Minali (ITA) | Malaysia | Kota Bharu |
| 21 March | Tour de Langkawi, Stage 4 | UCI Asia Tour | Riccardo Minali (ITA) | Malaysia | Pekan |
| 6 April | Tour of the Basque Country, Stage 5 | UCI World Tour | Omar Fraile (ESP) | Spain | Eibar |
| 15 April | Amstel Gold Race | UCI World Tour | Michael Valgren (DEN) | Netherlands | Berg en Terblijt |
| 16 April | Tour of the Alps, Stage 1 | UCI Europe Tour | Pello Bilbao (ESP) | Italy | Folgaria |
| 16 April | Tour of the Alps, Stage 2 | UCI Europe Tour | Miguel Ángel López (COL) | Italy | Fiemme Mountains |
| 19 April | Tour of the Alps, Stage 4 | UCI Europe Tour | Luis León Sánchez (ESP) | Austria | Lienz |
| 20 April | Tour of the Alps, Teams classification | UCI Europe Tour | (Note: The riders on the squad were Miguel Ángel López, Pello Bilbao, Jan Hirt, Luis León Sánchez, Nikita Stalnov, Davide Villella and Andrey Zeits) | Italy | |
| 22 April | Tour of Croatia, Young rider classification | UCI Europe Tour | Yevgeniy Gidich (KAZ) | Croatia | |
| 25 April | Tour de Romandie, Stage 1 | UCI World Tour | Omar Fraile (ESP) | Switzerland | Delémont |
| 28 April | Tour de Romandie, Stage 4 | UCI World Tour | Jakob Fuglsang (DEN) | Switzerland | Sion |
| 4 May | Tour de Yorkshire, Stage 2 | UCI Europe Tour | Magnus Cort (DEN) | United Kingdom | Ilkley |
| 27 May | Giro d'Italia, Young rider classification | UCI World Tour | Miguel Ángel López (COL) | Italy | |
| 9 June | Critérium du Dauphiné, Stage 6 | UCI World Tour | Pello Bilbao (ESP) | France | La Rosière |
| 10 June | Critérium du Dauphiné, Mountains classification | UCI World Tour | Dario Cataldo (ITA) | France | |
| 17 June | Tour de Suisse, Teams classification | UCI World Tour | (Note: The riders on the squad were Jakob Fuglsang, Omar Fraile, Oscar Gatto, Dmitriy Gruzdev, Jesper Hansen, Magnus Cort and Tanel Kangert) | Switzerland | |
| 12 July | Tour of Austria, Stage 6 | UCI Europe Tour | Alexey Lutsenko (KAZ) | Austria | Wenigzell |
| 21 July | Tour de France, Stage 14 | UCI World Tour | Omar Fraile (ESP) | France | Mende |
| 22 July | Tour de France, Stage 15 | UCI World Tour | Magnus Cort (DEN) | France | Carcassonne |
| 9 August | Vuelta a Burgos, Stage 3 | UCI Europe Tour | Miguel Ángel López (COL) | Spain | Espinosa de los Monteros |
| 10 August | Tour de Pologne, Teams classification | UCI World Tour | (Note: The riders on the squad were Zhandos Bizhigitov, Yevgeniy Gidich, Sergey Chernetskiy, Alexey Lutsenko, Andrey Zeits and Davide Villella) | Poland | |
| 11 August | Vuelta a Burgos, Points classification | UCI Europe Tour | Miguel Ángel López (COL) | Spain | |
| 17 August | BinckBank Tour, Stage 5 | UCI World Tour | Magnus Cort (DEN) | Belgium | Lanaken |
| 19 August | Arctic Race of Norway, Overall | UCI Europe Tour | Sergey Chernetskiy (RUS) | Norway | |
| 24 August | Tour Poitou-Charentes en Nouvelle-Aquitaine, Teams classification | UCI Europe Tour | (Note: The riders on the squad were Hugo Houle, Laurens De Vreese, Dmitriy Gruzdev, Sergey Chernetskiy, Tanel Kangert, Bakhtiyar Kozhatayev and Ruslan Tleubayev) | France | |
| 29 September | Tour of Almaty, Stage 1 | UCI Asia Tour | Davide Villella (ESP) | Kazakhstan | Almaty |
| 30 September | Tour of Almaty, Stage 2 | UCI Asia Tour | Luis León Sánchez (ESP) | Kazakhstan | Almaty |
| 30 September | Tour of Almaty, Overall | UCI Asia Tour | Davide Villella (ESP) | Kazakhstan | Almaty |
| 30 September | Tour of Almaty, Points classification | UCI Asia Tour | Davide Villella (ESP) | Kazakhstan | |
| 12 October | Tour of Turkey, Stage 4 | UCI World Tour | Alexey Lutsenko (KAZ) | Turkey | Marmaris |
| 21 October | Tour of Guangxi, Teams classification | UCI World Tour | (Note: The riders on the squad were Sergey Chernetskiy, Laurens De Vreese, Andriy Hrivko, Hugo Houle, Riccardo Minali, Luis León Sánchez and Ruslan Tleubayev) | China | |

== National, Continental and World champions 2018 ==
| Date | Discipline | Jersey | Rider | Country | Location |
|---|---|---|---|---|---|
| 20 June | Ukrainian National Time Trial Championships | | Andriy Hrivko (UKR) | Ukraine | Bohuslav |
| 27 June | Kazakhstan National Time Trial Championships | | Daniil Fominykh (KAZ) | Kazakhstan | Almaty |
| 28 June | Estonian National Time Trial Championships | | Tanel Kangert (EST) | Estonia | Otepää |
| 1 July | Kazakhstan National Road Race Championships | | Alexey Lutsenko (KAZ) | Kazakhstan | Almaty |
| 23 August | Asian Games, Men's road race | | Alexey Lutsenko (KAZ) | Indonesia | Subang |
| 24 August | Asian Games, ITT | | Alexey Lutsenko (KAZ) | Indonesia | Subang |
