= Anton Kuzmin =

Kazakh bicycle racer

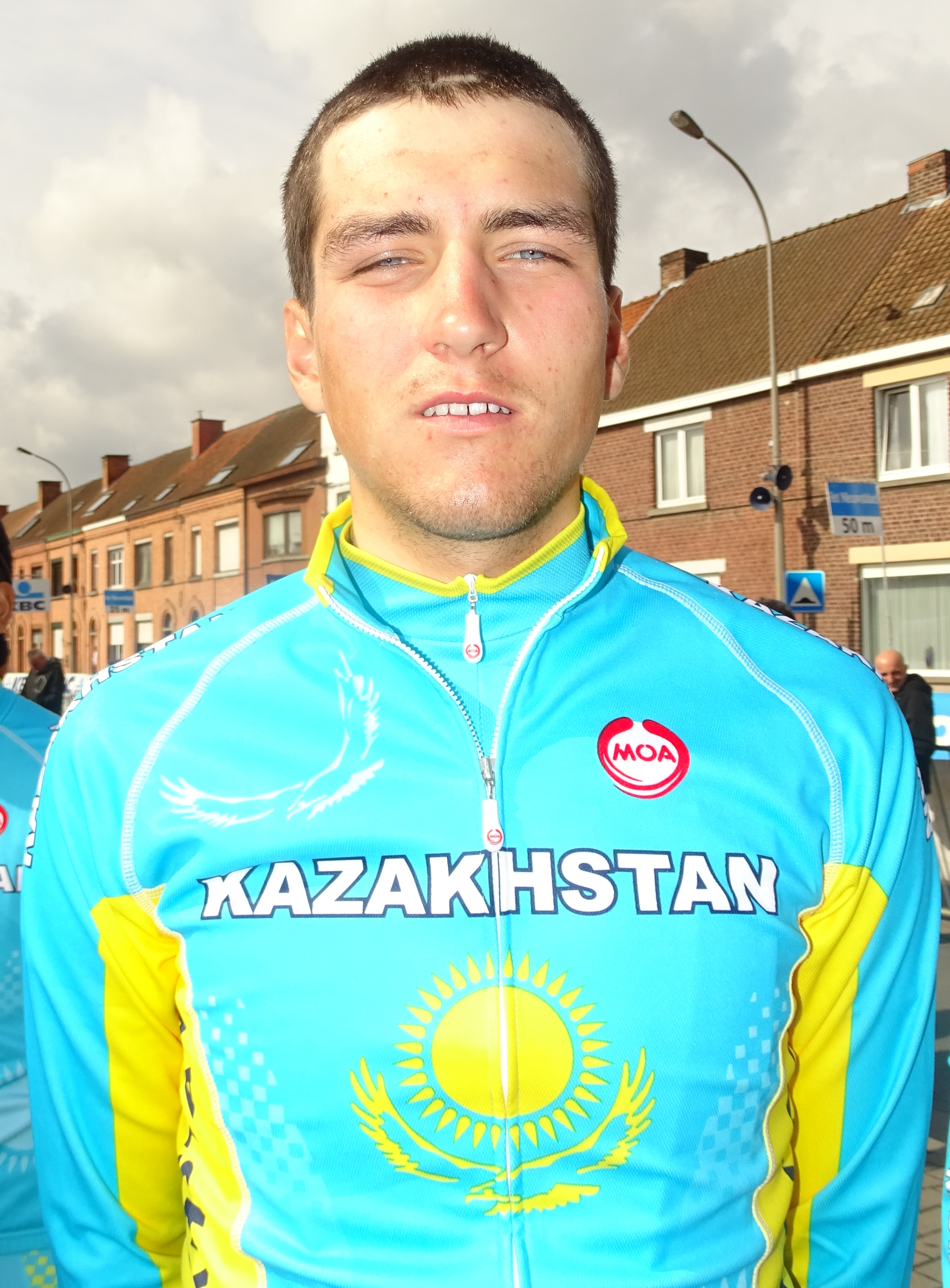
- Kuzmin in 2015

Personal information
- Born: 20 November 1996 (age 29) Taldykorgan, Kazakhstan
- Height: 1.86 m (6 ft 1 in)
- Weight: 66 kg (146 lb)

Cycling career
- Sport: Cycling
- Current team: XDS Astana Team
- Discipline: Road
- Role: Rider

Professional teams
- 2015–2019: Seven Rivers Cycling Team
- 2020–2021: Gazprom–RusVelo
- 2022–2023: Almaty Cycling Team
- 2024–: Astana Qazaqstan Team
Medal record
Men's road bicycle racing
Representing Kazakhstan
Asian Cycling Championships
Gold medal – first place	2025 Phitsanulok	Mixed team relay

Anton Kuzmin (born 20 November 1996) is a Kazakh cyclist, who currently rides for UCI WorldTeam XDS Astana Team.

== Major results ==
2014
3rd Time trial, National Junior Road Championships
2017
8th Overall Gemenc Grand Prix
2018
6th Overall Tour of Cartier
9th Overall Bałtyk–Karkonosze Tour

1st Young rider classification

2019
3rd Road race, National Road Championships
7th Overall Bałtyk–Karkonosze Tour
9th Overall Szlakiem Grodów Piastowskich
10th Overall Tour of Almaty
2022
1st Grand Prix Cappadocia
3rd Time trial, National Road Championships
8th Grand Prix Kapuzbaşı
10th Grand Prix Mediterranean
10th Grand Prix Tomarza
2023
1st Tour of Kandovan
1st Stage 3 Tour of Thailand
2nd The Tour Oqtosh-Chorvoq-Mountain
2nd Grand Prix Kaisareia
National Road Championships

3rd Time trial
4th Road race

3rd Overall Tour of Azerbaijan (Iran)
3rd Grand Prix Kültepe
5th Overall Tour of Sharjah
5th Tour of Bostonliq I
6th Overall Tour of Huangshan
9th Tour of Bostonliq II
10th Alanya Cup
2024
4th Time trial, National Road Championships
