= Cycling at the 1998 Asian Games – Men's individual time trial =

Men's individual time trial at the 1998 Asian Games
- Venue: Phahonyothin Road
- Date: 10 December 1998
- Competitors: 28 from 15 nations

Medalists
gold medal	Ghader Mizbani	Iran
silver medal	Dmitriy Fofonov	Kazakhstan
bronze medal	Pavel Nevdakh	Kazakhstan

The men's individual time trial competition at the 1998 Asian Games was held on 10 December.

== Schedule ==
All times are Indochina Time (UTC+07:00)

Date	Time	Event
Thursday, 10 December 1998	08:00	Final

== Results ==
Rank	Athlete	Time
1st place, gold medalist(s)	Ghader Mizbani (IRI)	1:03:16.94
2nd place, silver medalist(s)	Dmitriy Fofonov (KAZ)	1:03:48.60
3rd place, bronze medalist(s)	Pavel Nevdakh (KAZ)	1:04:09.85
4	Sergey Derevyanov (KGZ)	1:04:16.30
5	Makoto Iijima (JPN)	1:04:46.34
6	Kim Bong-min (KOR)	1:05:20.83
7	Yoshiyuki Abe (JPN)	1:05:30.60
8	Sergey Arkov (UZB)	1:05:44.72
9	Victor Espiritu (PHI)	1:06:08.23
10	Sergey Krushevskiy (UZB)	1:06:10.56
11	Thongchai Wangardjaingam (THA)	1:06:22.26
12	Sergey Yazov (KGZ)	1:06:40.32
13	John Ong (SIN)	1:06:57.12
14	Wong Kam Po (HKG)	1:06:59.72
15	Li Fuyu (CHN)	1:07:07.46
16	Ahad Kazemi (IRI)	1:07:07.96
17	Tang Xuezhong (CHN)	1:07:26.64
18	Arnel Quirimit (PHI)	1:08:25.54
19	Bandit Sosalum (THA)	1:10:57.62
20	Humaid Al-Sabbagh (UAE)	1:11:27.37
21	Jamsrangiin Ölzii-Orshikh (MGL)	1:11:32.84
22	Ali Sayed Darwish (UAE)	1:11:46.36
23	Pg Dato Hj Asmalee (BRU)	1:12:39.10
24	Ng Kwok Wah (HKG)	1:13:32.82
25	Lee Chieng Chien (BRU)	1:14:33.28
26	Kwan Chung Yin (MAC)	1:17:00.94
27	Cheong Wai Chong (MAC)	1:17:21.12
28	Dashnyamyn Tömör-Ochir (MGL)	1:17:38.65
