= Dmitry Lukyanov (cyclist) =

Kazakhstani cyclist

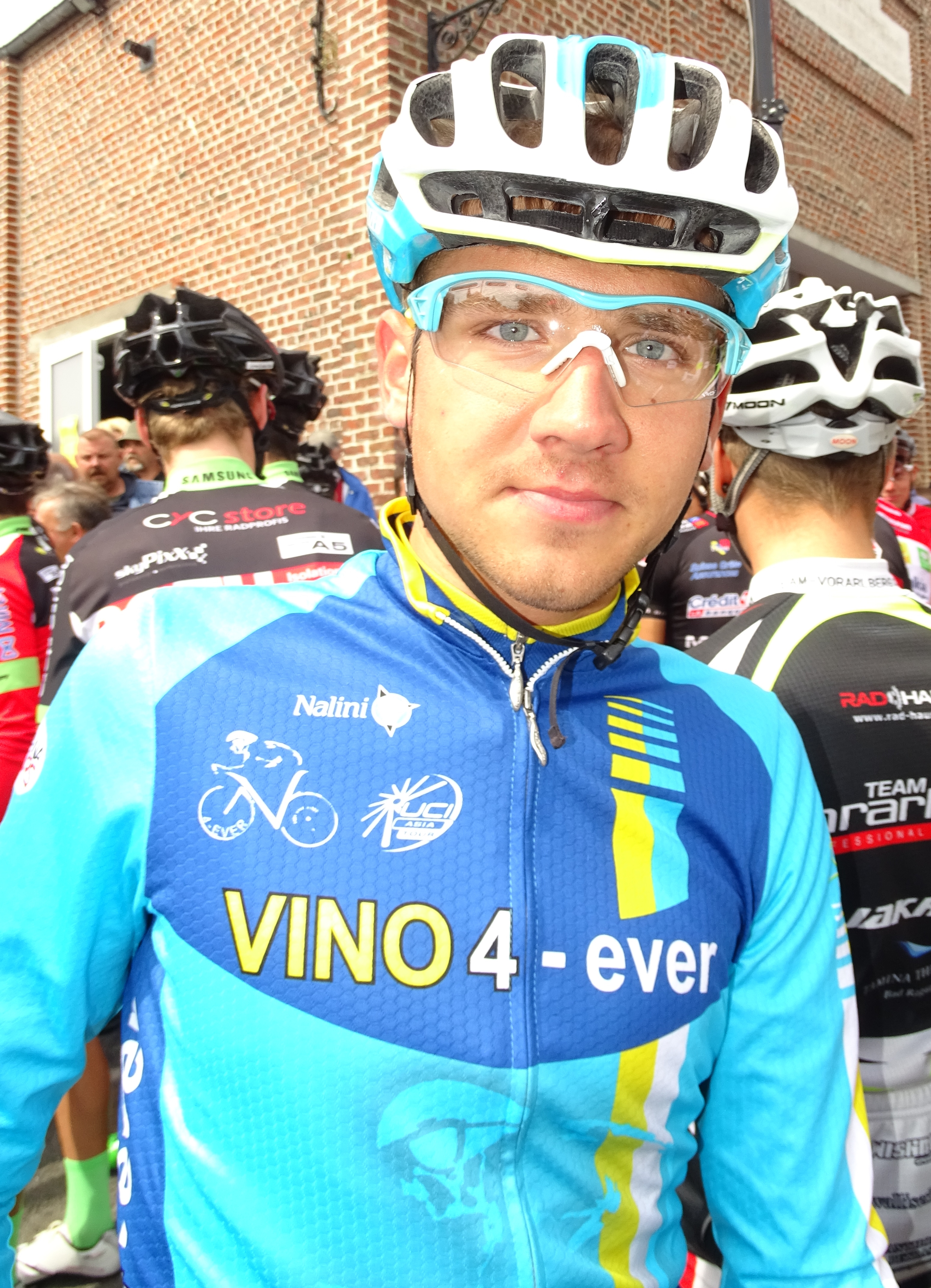
- Lukyanov in 2015

Personal information
- Full name: Dmitry Lukyanov
- Born: 9 March 1993 (age 33)

Cycling career
- Sport: Cycling
- Discipline: Road
- Role: Rider

Professional teams
- 2014–2017: Vino 4ever
- 2018: Apple Team

Dmitry Lukyanov (born 9 March 1993) is a Kazakhstani professional racing cyclist. He rode in the men's team time trial at the 2015 UCI Road World Championships, and finished second at the 2015 Kazakhstan National Road Race Championships and its under-23 equivalent.
