= Yuriy Natarov =

Kazakh cyclist (born 1996)

- Natarov at the 2021 Vuelta a España

Personal information
- Full name: Yuriy Olegovich Natarov
- Born: 28 December 1996 (age 29) Talgar, Almaty Region, Kazakhstan
- Height: 1.86 m (6 ft 1 in)
- Weight: 68 kg (150 lb)

Cycling career
- Sport: Cycling
- Discipline: Road
- Role: Rider

Amateur team
- 2024: Bross Cycling Team

Professional teams
- 2015: Seven Rivers Cycling Team
- 2016–2018: Astana City
- 2019–2023: Astana

Major wins
- Stage races Tour of Almaty (2019) National championships Time trial (2022)
Medal record
Representing Kazakhstan
Men's road bicycle racing
Asian Championships
Gold medal – first place	2019 Tashkent	Team time trial
Gold medal – first place	2022 Dushanbe	Team time trial
Bronze medal – third place	2017 Manama	Under-23 time trial

Yuriy Olegovich Natarov (born 28 December 1996 in Talgar, Almaty Region, Kazakhstan) is a Kazakh former professional road cyclist. From 2019 to 2023, he rode for UCI WorldTeam Astana. Natarov won the 2019 Tour of Almaty, became the Kazakhstan national time trial champion in 2022, and won the team time trial at the 2019 Asian Road Cycling Championships and 2022 Asian Road Cycling Championships.

== Biography ==
=== Early life and introduction to cycling ===
Natarov was born on 28 December 1996 in Talgar, Almaty Region, Kazakhstan, where he spent his childhood.

He began cycling while at school, around 2006, at the specialised youth Olympic reserve cycling school named after Andrey Kivilev in Talgar. His first road cycling coach was Alexander Nikolayevich Morozov.

In 2011, after completing the eighth grade, Natarov moved to Almaty, where he continued his education and athletic training at the Republican Boarding School for Gifted Children in Sports named after Karken Akhmetov. He studied there from the ninth through the eleventh grade, combining his education with training and competition in road cycling. After finishing school, he continued his studies at the college affiliated with the same sports institution.

Published materials from the 2013 Shkolnik Kazakhstana cycling race list Natarov as a representative of the Talgar specialised youth Olympic reserve sports school and name A. N. Morozov and S. G. Tretyakov among his coaches.

His first notable results at national level came as a junior. In 2014, Natarov became the Kazakhstan junior national champion in the individual time trial. In April of the same year, at the national junior stage-race championships in Taldykorgan, he won the 25 km individual time trial with a time of 32 minutes 58 seconds.

=== Under-23 career ===
In 2015, while continuing his studies at college, Natarov began competing at continental level for the Kazakh team Seven Rivers Cycling Team. From 2016 to 2018, he rode for Astana City.

=== Astana Pro Team and the WorldTour ===
Following the 2018 season, Natarov joined Astana Pro Team. At the team's official presentation for the 2019 season, he was introduced as one of nine new riders who would join the team from 1 January 2019.

During his first season at WorldTour level, Natarov won the team time trial at the 2019 Asian Road Championships as part of the Kazakhstan national team. The winning team also included Zhandos Bizhigitov, Dmitriy Gruzdev, Artyom Zakharov, Yevgeniy Gidich and Daniil Fominykh.

In August 2019, he took his first professional victory by winning the general classification of the Tour of Almaty. On the final stage, Natarov attacked on the finishing climb and placed third, which was enough to move into first place overall. Aleksandr Vlasov finished second in the general classification.

In 2020, Natarov continued to race for Astana, taking part in events including the Tour de Pologne and Tirreno–Adriatico. At the 2020 UCI Road World Championships in Imola, he finished 74th in the men's road race.

Ahead of the 2021 season, one of Natarov's main goals was to make his debut in a three-week Grand Tour. In an interview, he identified the Vuelta a España as the most likely race for his Grand Tour debut.

In August 2021, he was selected for the Astana–Premier Tech squad for the 2021 Vuelta a España. He completed all 21 stages of his first Grand Tour and finished 91st in the general classification. During the same season, Natarov finished third in the individual time trial and fourth in the road race at the Kazakhstan National Road Championships.

In October 2021, Natarov signed a two-year contract extension with Astana, covering the 2022 and 2023 seasons.

=== Championship season in 2022 ===
In March 2022, Natarov won his second Asian title in the team time trial. Over the 24 km course in Dushanbe, the Kazakhstan team of Natarov, Igor Chzhan, Yevgeniy Gidich and Yevgeniy Fedorov recorded a time of 26 minutes 49 seconds to take first place.

On 22 June, Natarov won the elite individual time trial at the Kazakhstan National Road Championships in Shchuchinsk. He completed the 30 km course in 37 minutes 46 seconds, finishing 51 seconds ahead of runner-up Igor Chzhan.

Later that year, he finished 11th in the road race at the Asian Road Championships and 32nd in the individual time trial at the 2022 UCI Road World Championships.

=== Final seasons ===
In 2023, Natarov completed his fifth and final season with the WorldTour squad Astana Qazaqstan Team. At the Kazakhstan National Road Championships, he finished eighth in the individual time trial.

In 2024, Natarov rode for Bross Cycling Team. His recorded appearances during the season included races in China; ProCyclingStats lists no further international professional racing results after the 2024 season.

== Major results ==
2014
1st Time trial, National Junior Road Championships

2015
7th Time trial, National Road Championships

2016
1st Time trial, National Under-23 Road Championships
3rd Points classification, Carpathian Couriers Race
6th Time trial, National Road Championships

2017
2nd GP Capodarco
3rd Time trial, Asian Under-23 Road Championships
8th Time trial, National Road Championships
10th Overall Tour of Almaty
14th Time trial, UCI Road World Under-23 Championships

2018
8th Road race, National Road Championships
8th Time trial, National Road Championships
10th Overall Giro Ciclistico d'Italia

2019
1st Team time trial, Asian Road Championships
1st Overall Tour of Almaty

2021
3rd Time trial, National Road Championships
4th Road race, Road race, National Road Championships

2022
1st Team time trial, Asian Road Championships
1st Time trial, National Road Championships

2023
8th Time trial, National Road Championships

=== Grand Tour general classification results timeline ===
Grand Tour	2021
Giro d'Italia	—
Tour de France	—
Vuelta a España	91

Legend
—	Did not compete
DNF	Did not finish

== Rankings ==
Year	2016	2017	2018	2019	2020	2021	2022	2023
UCI World Ranking	2315th	904th	1903rd	554th	1331st	683rd	517th	2091st
UCI Europe Tour	–	945th	2080th	–	–	–	–	–
UCI Asia Tour	516th	197th	348th	20th	82nd	12th	17th	–

Source: UCI
