= Maxim Iglinsky =

Kazakh cyclist (born 1981)

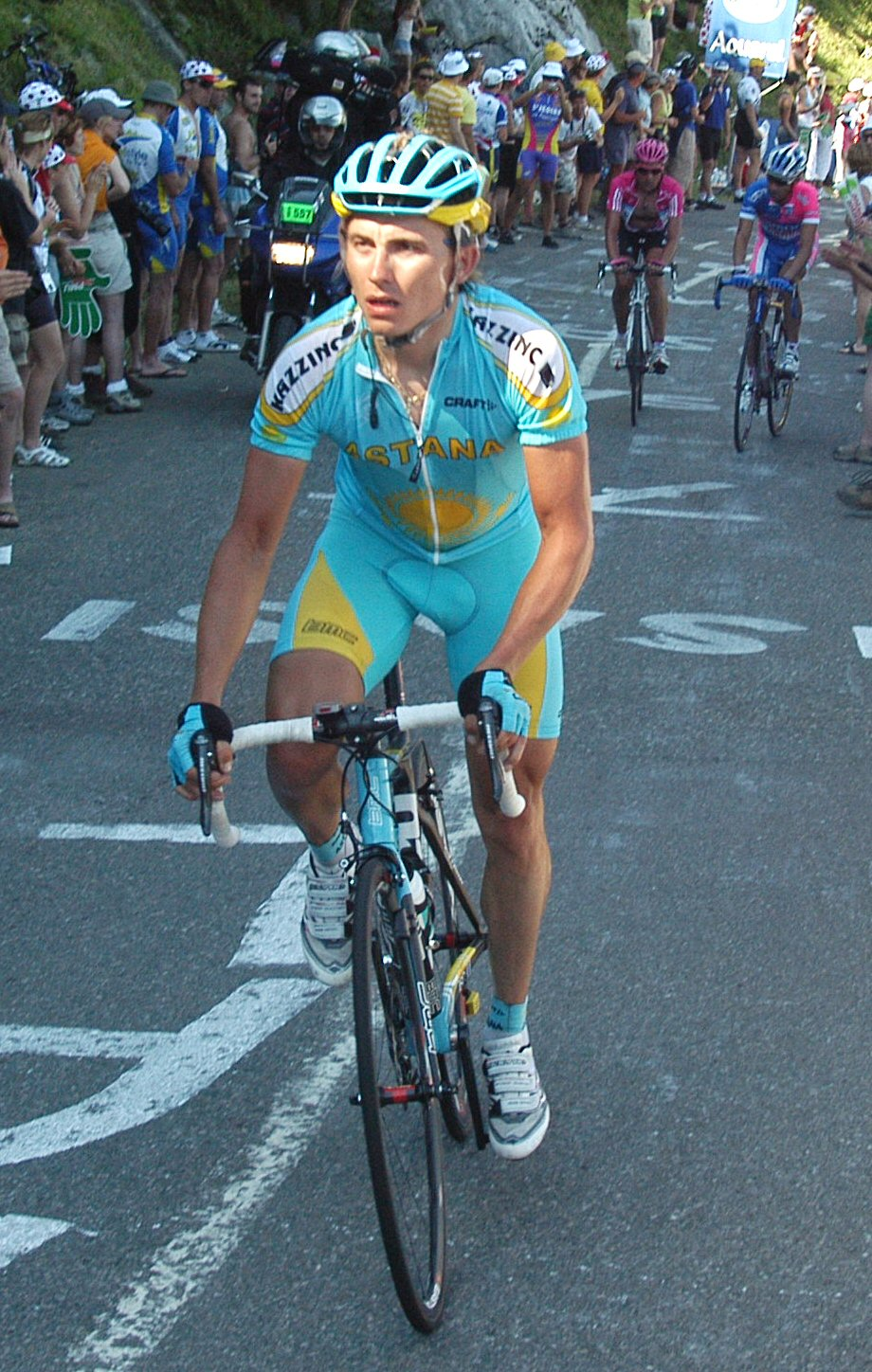
- Iglinsky at the 2007 Tour de France

Personal information
- Full name: Maxim Gennadyevich Iglinsky
- Born: 18 April 1981 (age 45) Tselinograd, Kazakh SSR, Soviet Union (Astana, Kazakhstan)
- Height: 1.73 m (5 ft 8 in)
- Weight: 67 kg (148 lb)

Cycling career
- Sport: Cycling
- Discipline: Road
- Role: Rider
- Rider type: Puncheur

Professional teams
- 2004: Capec
- 2005: Domina Vacanze
- 2006: Team Milram
- 2007–2014: Astana

Major wins
- One-day races and Classics National Time Trial Championships (2006) National Road Race Championships (2007) Liège–Bastogne–Liège (2012) Strade Bianche (2010)
Medal record
Representing Kazakhstan
Men's road bicycle racing
Asian Championships
Silver medal – second place	2014 Astana	Road race

Maxim Gennadyevich Iglinsky (Kazakh: Максим Геннадьевич Иглинский; born 18 April 1981) is a Kazakh former road racing cyclist who rode professionally from 2004 to 2014 with the Capec, Domina Vacanze, Team Milram and Astana teams.

== Career ==
Iglinsky turned professional in 2005 with Domina Vacanze and rode for Team Milram in 2006. Iglinsky won stage 6 of the 2007 Critérium du Dauphiné Libéré. He is the elder brother of Valentin Iglinsky.

In spring 2012, he prevailed in one of the Ardennes Classic races, Liège–Bastogne–Liège. He broke away from the chasing group with Joaquim Rodríguez (Team Katusha), subsequently dropping him and flying by race leader Vincenzo Nibali (Liquigas–Cannondale) with one kilometer to go to win solo.

He was provisionally suspended in October 2014 after testing positive for EPO in August 2014. His brother Valentin Iglinsky was suspended on 10 September for testing positive, also in August 2014. Maxim Iglinsky received a two-year ban, dating from the publication of the positive test, expiring 30 September 2016.

== Major results ==
2002
1st Overall Vuelta a la Independencia Nacional

1st Stage 8

2nd Overall Tour of China

1st Stage 2

4th Overall Tour of Japan
2003
1st Stage 3 Tour de Bulgaria
2nd Flèche Ardennaise
7th Overall Grand Prix Guillaume Tell
8th Omloop van het Houtland
2004
1st Overall Vuelta a la Independencia Nacional
1st Prix de la Slantchev Brjag
2nd Road race, Asian Road Championships
3rd Road race, National Road Championships
3rd Overall Tour of Greece

1st Prologue

3rd Memorial Philippe Van Coningsloo
5th Overall Tour de l'Avenir
5th Boucles de l'Aulne
6th Overall Tour de Beauce
2005
1st GP Cittá di Camaiore
1st Stage 6 Deutschland Tour
2nd Time trial, National Road Championships
5th Giro del Lazio
2006
National Road Championships

1st Time trial
3rd Road race

2007
1st Road race, National Road Championships
1st Stage 6 Critérium du Dauphiné Libéré
2008
1st Mountains classification, Tour de Suisse
9th Overall Tour de Romandie

1st Stage 1

2009
3rd E3 Prijs Vlaanderen
8th GP Ouest–France
2010
1st Montepaschi Strade Bianche
3rd Overall Tour Méditerranéen
4th Overall Tirreno–Adriatico
7th Gent–Wevelgem
8th Milan–San Remo
8th Tour of Flanders
2012
1st Liège–Bastogne–Liège
2nd Strade Bianche
2013
1st Tour of Almaty
1st Stage 4 Tour of Belgium
1st Stage 1 (TTT) Vuelta a España
8th Road race, UCI Road World Championships
8th Dwars door Vlaanderen
9th Overall Eneco Tour
2014
2nd Road race, Asian Road Championships

=== Grand Tour general classification results timeline ===
Grand Tour	2005	2006	2007	2008	2009	2010	2011	2012	2013	2014
Giro d'Italia	—	—	—	55	—	—	—	—	—	—
Tour de France	37	DNF	DNF	—	—	131	105	116	—	129
Vuelta a España	—	—	—	—	DNF	—	—	—	DNF	—

Legend
—	Did not compete
DNF	Did not finish
