= Sergey Renev =

Kazakhstani cyclist (born 1985)

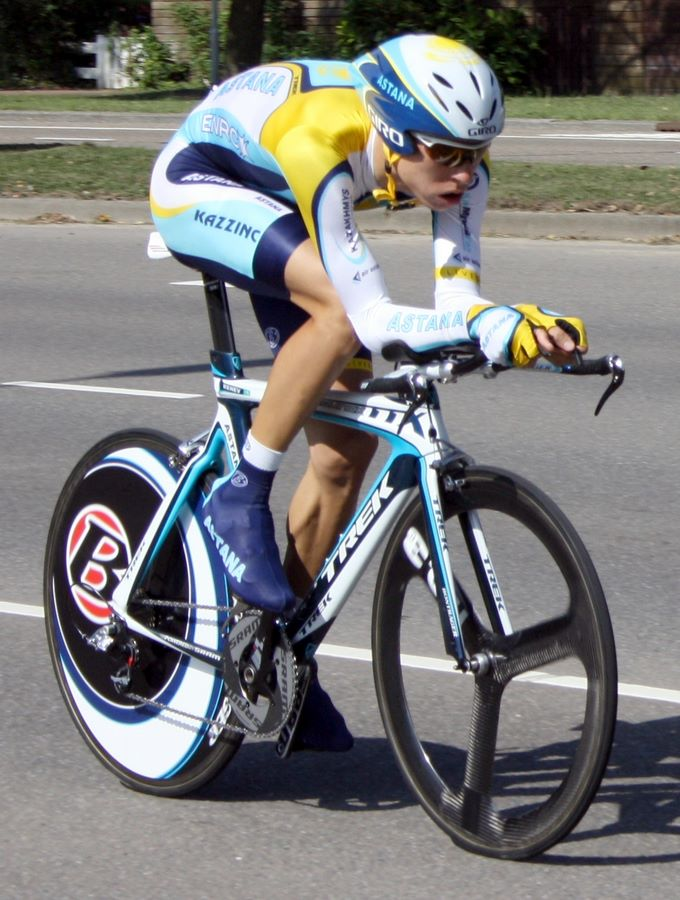
- Renev at the 2009 Eneco Tour.

Personal information
- Full name: Sergey Renev
- Born: 3 February 1985 (age 41)
- Height: 1.84 m (6 ft 0 in)
- Weight: 68 kg (150 lb)

Cycling career
- Sport: Cycling
- Discipline: Road
- Role: Rider

Professional teams
- 2008: Ulan
- 2009–2012: Astana
- 2013: Continental Team Astana

Sergey Renev (born 3 February 1985) is a Kazakhstani former road bicycle racer who rode at UCI WorldTeam level for Astana from 2009 to 2012. He completed the 2010 Vuelta a Espana, and was twice (2008 and 2013) runner up in his national championship. He also competed in the 2010 Milan–San Remo and in the road race at the 2011 UCI Road World Championships.

== Major results ==
2005
1st Hill-climb, National Under-23 Road Championships
2007
3rd GP Capodarco
4th GP Citta di Felino
2008
2nd Road race, National Road Championships
2013
2nd Road race, National Road Championships
