= Grand Prix Cappadocia =

Race details
- Date: September
- Region: Kayseri Province
- Discipline: Road
- Competition: UCI Europe Tour
- Type: One-day race

History
- First edition: 2020
- Editions: 2 (as of 2022)
- First winner: Mykhaylo Kononenko (UKR) (men); Valeriya Kononenko (UKR) (women)
- Most wins: No repeat winners
- Most recent: Anton Kuzmin (KAZ) (men); Valeriya Kononenko (UKR) (women)

The Grand Prix Cappadocia is a men's and women's one-day road cycling race held in Turkey. It is rated as a 1.2 event on the UCI Europe Tour.

== Winners ==
=== Men ===
Year	Country	Rider	Team
2020	Ukraine	Mykhaylo Kononenko	Ukraine (national team)
2022	Kazakhstan	Anton Kuzmin	Almaty Cycling Team

=== Women ===
Year	Country	Rider	Team
2020	Ukraine	Valeriya Kononenko	Ukraine (national team)
