= Andrey Mizurov =

Kazakhstani cyclist (born 1973)

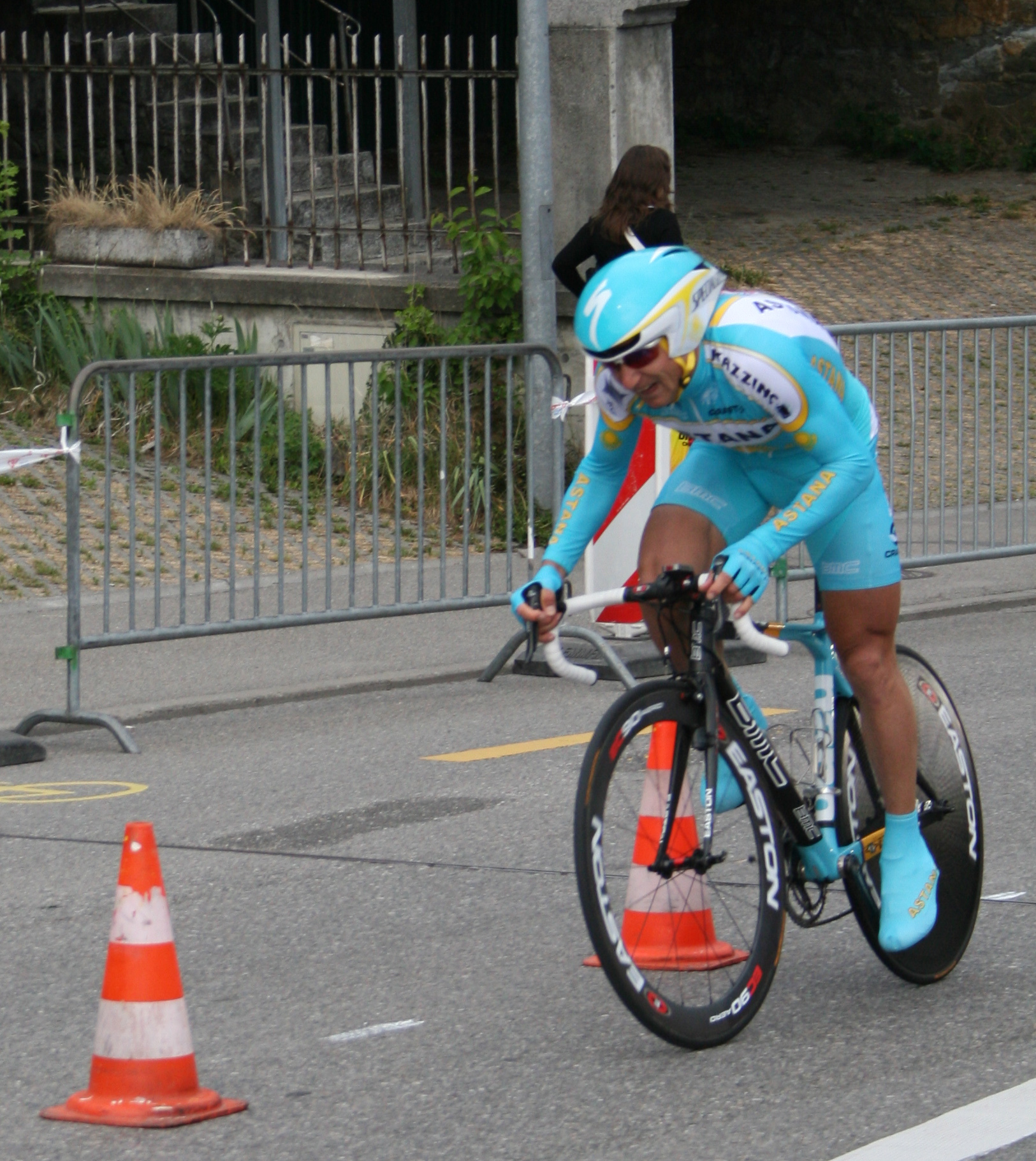

Personal information
- Full name: Andrey Mizurov
- Nickname: Mizu
- Born: March 16, 1973 (age 53) Karaganda, Soviet Union
- Height: 1.70 m (5 ft 7 in)
- Weight: 62 kg (137 lb)

Cycling career
- Sport: Cycling
- Discipline: Road
- Role: Rider
- Rider type: All-rounder

Professional teams
- 1999: Collstrop–De Federale Verzekeringen
- 2000–2001: Team Telekom
- 2002: Mercatone Uno
- 2003–2004: MBK–Oktos–Saint-Quentin
- 2005–2006: Capec
- 2007–2009: Astana
- 2009–2010: Tabriz Petrochemical Team
- 2011: Astana
- 2012: Tabriz Petrochemical Team
- 2013: Torku Şekerspor
- 2014: RTS–Santic Racing Team

Major wins
- National Time Trial Championships (1999, 2002, 2008–2010, 2013); National Road Race Championships (2001–2004, 2011); Tour of Qinghai Lake (2009)

Andrey Mizurov (Kazakh: Андрей Мизуров, born March 16, 1973) is a Kazakhstani former professional road bicycle racer.

== Major results ==
1991
1st Overall Giro della Lunigiana
1997
1st Overall Azerbaïjan Tour
1st Overall Tour of Croatia
1998
2nd Time trial, National Road Championships
10th Overall Tour de Langkawi
1999
1st Road race, National Road Championships
2000
National Road Championships

2nd Time trial
3rd Road race

2001
National Road Championships

1st Road race
4th Time trial

2002
National Road Championships

1st Time trial
4th Road race

2003
10th Paris–Bourges
2004
National Road Championships

1st Road race
2nd Time trial

1st Stage 7 Tour of Qinghai Lake
4th Tro-Bro Léon
9th Overall Route du Sud
9th Overall Tour de la Somme
2005
1st UCI Asia Tour
1st Overall Tour of China

1st Stage 1 (ITT)

1st Overall Vuelta a la Independencia Nacional

1st Stage ?

1st GP Jamp
2nd Overall Tour of Japan

1st Stage 4

2nd Road race, National Road Championships
5th Overall Circuito Montañés
9th Overall Tour of Qinghai Lake
2006
3rd Time trial, Asian Games
3rd Overall Tour de Guadeloupe

1st Stages 2a, 2b (ITT) & 9b

3rd Overall Tour of Japan
5th Overall Tour de Bretagne

1st Stage 2

2007
National Road Championships

2nd Road race
3rd Time trial

8th Time trial, UCI Road World Championships
2008
1st Time trial, National Road Championships
2009
1st Overall Tour of Qinghai Lake

1st Prologue

1st Overall Tour de East Java

1st Stage 2

1st Time trial, National Road Championships
2nd Overall Tour of Iran
3rd Overall Tour de Indonesia

1st Stage 1 (TTT)

4th Overall Tour de Singkarak
10th Overall Tour de Kumano
10th Overall Tour of Bulgaria
2010
1st Time trial, Asian Cycling Championships
1st Time trial, National Road Championships
1st Overall Tour de Kumano
2nd Overall Tour of Japan
5th Overall International Azerbaïjan Tour

1st Stage 3
5th Overall Tour Cycliste International de la Guadeloupe

6th Overall Tour of Qinghai Lake
2011
National Road Championships

1st Road race
2nd Time trial

10th Overall Tour of Austria
2012
4th Time trial, National Road Championships
8th Overall Tour of Qinghai Lake
2013
1st Time trial, National Road Championships
Asian Cycling Championships

2nd Time trial
3rd Road race

3rd Overall Tour du Maroc
4th Overall Tour of Qinghai Lake
2014
6th Time trial, National Road Championships
