= Pavel Nevdakh =

Kazakhstani cyclist

Personal information
- Born: 14 October 1976 (age 50) Kazakhstan

Cycling career
- Sport: Cycling
- Current team: Retired
- Discipline: Road
- Role: Rider

Pavel Nevdakh (born 14 October 1976) is a Kazakh former cyclist. He won the Kazakhstan National Road Race Championships 2003 and the Time Trial Championships 2004.

== Major results ==
1998
3rd Time trial, Asian Games
3rd National Time Trial Championships
1999
3rd National Road Race Championships
9th Asian Time Trial Championships
2001
3rd National Time Trial Championships
2002
2nd National Road Race Championships
3rd National Time Trial Championships
9th Overall Tour of Japan
2003
1st National Road Race Championships
3rd Overall Tour of Romania
2004
1st National Time Trial Championships
1st Stage 3 Tour de Serbie
3rd Overall Tour d'Egypte
2006
1st Overall Tour du Cameroun

1st Stage 2

7th Overall Tour of Turkey

1st Prologue & Stage 5

7th Overall Tour d'Egypte
2007
1st Overall Kerman Tour
1st Prologue Tour of Mevlana
7th Overall Tour of Turkey
2008
3rd Overall Tour d'Egypte

1st Prologue
