= Andrey Zeits =

Kazakh road bicycle racer

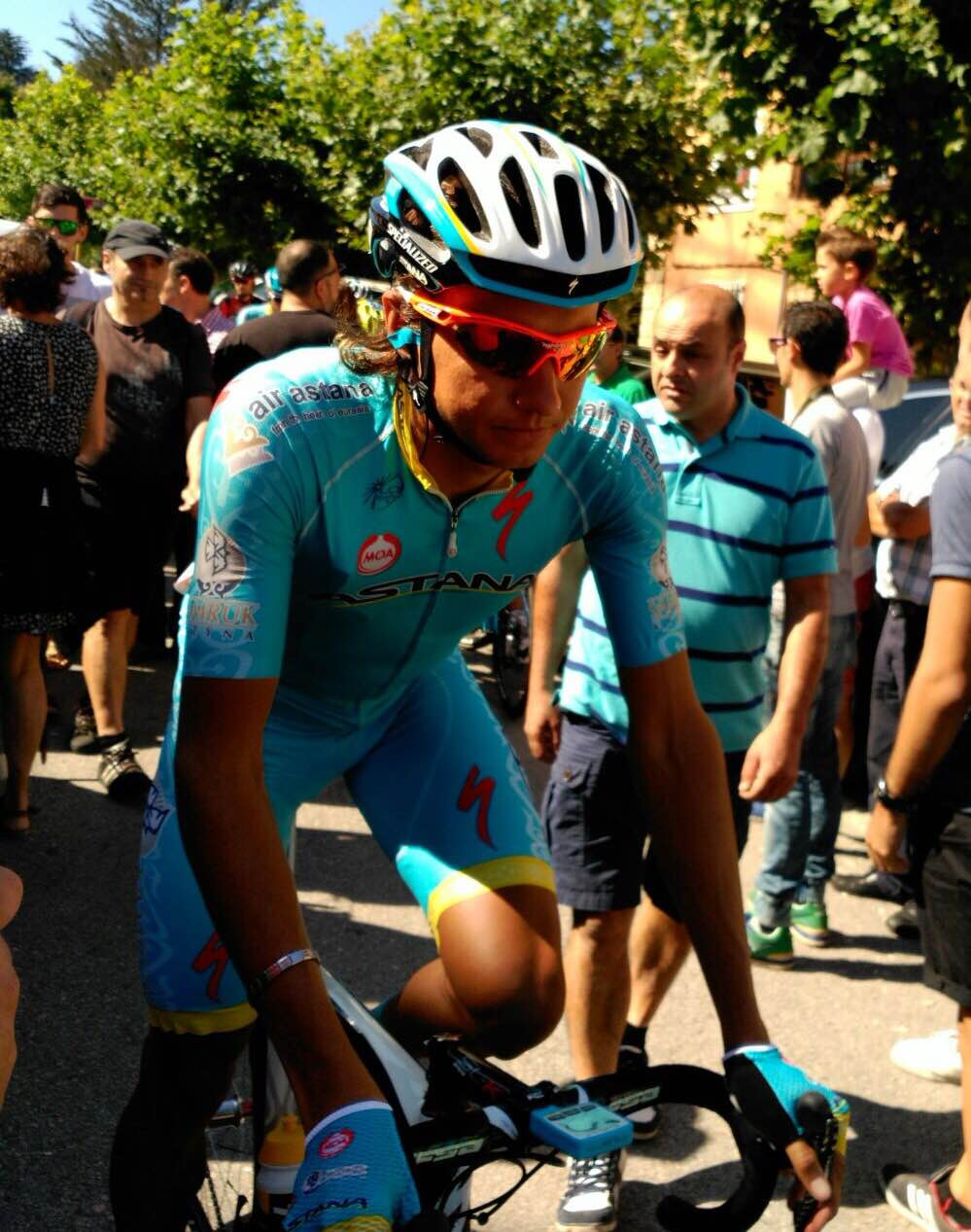
- Zeits at the 2015 Vuelta a España

Personal information
- Full name: Andrey Sergeyevich Zeits; Андрей Сергеевич Зейц
- Born: 14 December 1986 (age 39): Pavlodar, Kazakh SSR, Soviet Union; (now Kazakhstan)
- Height: 1.78 m (5 ft 10 in)
- Weight: 69 kg (152 lb)

Cycling career
- Sport: Cycling
- Current team: Retired
- Discipline: Road
- Role: Rider

Professional teams
- 2005: Capec
- 2008–2019: Astana
- 2020–2021: Mitchelton–Scott
- 2022–2023: Astana Qazaqstan Team

Andrey Sergeyevich Zeits (Russian: Андрей Сергеевич Зейц; born 14 December 1986) is a Kazakh former professional road bicycle racer. In 2009, Zeits rode the Giro d'Italia, the first grand tour of his career, which he finished in 31st place.

After twelve years with the Astana team, Zeits joined Mitchelton–Scott on a two-year contract from the 2020 season. He rejoined the renamed Astana Qazaqstan Team for the 2022 season.

== Major results ==
2006
1st Stage 4 Giro della Valle d'Aosta
2007
4th Giro del Belvedere
6th Gran Premio Palio del Recioto
7th Overall Grand Prix Guillaume Tell
9th Overall Giro delle Regioni
10th Road race, UCI Under-23 Road World Championships
2008
2nd Time trial, National Road Championships
2009
3rd Time trial, National Road Championships
2011
2nd Overall Tour of Turkey
2012
5th Time trial, National Road Championships
8th Overall Tour de Langkawi
2013
1st Stage 1 (TTT) Vuelta a España
2014
1st Sprints classification, Vuelta a Andalucía
3rd Overall Tour of Hainan

1st Asian rider classification

2015
2nd Overall Tour of Hainan

1st Stage 8

10th Tour of Almaty
2016
8th Road race, Olympic Games
8th Overall Tour de Pologne
2017
1st Team time trial, Asian Road Championships
9th Overall Tour of Turkey
2018
National Road Championships

3rd Time trial
5th Road race

2019
4th Overall CRO Race
2021
10th Overall Settimana Ciclistica Italiana
2022
6th Road race, Asian Road Championships
8th Mont Ventoux Dénivelé Challenge
9th Overall Giro di Sicilia
9th Overall Route d'Occitanie
10th Overall Tour de Langkawi
2023
1st Overall Tour de Kyushu

1st Stage 2

9th Mercan'Tour Classic

=== Grand Tour general classification results timeline ===
Grand Tour	2009	2010	2011	2012	2013	2014	2015	2016	2017	2018	2019	2020	2021	2022	2023
Giro d'Italia	31	—	—	85	106	102	59	33	63	67	26	—	—	—	—
Tour de France	—	—	44	—	—	—	—	—	44	—	—	—	—	39	—
/ Vuelta a España	—	102	—	52	81	50	68	31	—	52	—	—	44	—	46

Legend
—	Did not compete
DNF	Did not finish
