= Andrey Teteryuk =

Kazakhstani cyclist

Andrey Teteryuk Андрей Тетерюк
Personal information
- Full name: Andrey Yuryevich Teteryuk; Андрей Юрьевич Тетерюк
- Nickname: Professor
- Born: September 20, 1967 (age 59) Astana, Kazakh SSR, Soviet Union
- Height: 1.83 m (6 ft 0 in)
- Weight: 72 kg (159 lb; 11 st 5 lb)

Cycling career
- Sport: Cycling
- Discipline: Road
- Role: Rider

Professional teams
- 1992: Carrera Jeans–Vagabond
- 1993–1994: Mapei–Viner
- 1995–1996: Aki–Gipiemme
- 1997–1998: Lotto–Mobistar–Isoglass
- 1999–2000: Liquigas
- 2001: Mercury–Viatel
- 2002: CCC–Polsat
- 2003–2004: Team Nippon Hodo

Andrey Yuryevich Teteryuk (Russian: Андрей Юрьевич Тетерюк; born September 20, 1967) is a Kazakhstani former professional road bicycle racer who represented his country at the Olympic games.

== Major results ==
1987
1st Stage 5 Vuelta a Colombia
1989
1st Overall Giro Ciclistico d'Italia
1st Stage 1 Okolo Slovenska
7th Overall Course de la Paix
1991
9th Overall Tour d'Armorique
1992
1st Milano-Vignola
1st Stage 4 Tour of Britain
1993
7th Trofeo Matteotti
1994
3rd Memorial Gastone Nencini
1995
6th Overall Tour DuPont
9th Overall Tour de Suisse
1996
1st Giro del Friuli
1st Stage 4 Tour de Suisse
1997
4th Overall Tour de Romandie
5th Overall Critérium du Dauphiné Libéré

1st Stage 7

10th Overall Vuelta a Burgos
10th Overall Tour of Galicia
1998
3rd Overall Critérium du Dauphiné Libéré
4th Classique des Alpes
4th Overall Euskal Bizikleta
8th GP du canton d'Argovie
9th Overall Vuelta a Burgos
1999
National Road Championships

1st Road race
3rd Time trial

2nd Overall Tour of Galicia
3rd Overall Critérium International
2000
1st Overall Tour of Galicia

1st Stage 2

3rd Road race, National Road Championships
6th Time trial, Olympic Games
9th Time trial, UCI Road World Championships
2001
5th Overall GP du Midi-Libre

1st Stage 3 (ITT)

2002
8th Giro del Lago Maggiore
8th Overall Giro del Trentino

=== Grand Tour general classification results timeline ===
Grand Tour	1992	1993	1994	1995	1996	1997	1998	1999	2000
Giro d'Italia	—	83	78	24	13	—	—	22	—
Tour de France	—	—	—	—	—	DNF	20	—	—
Vuelta a España	DNF	104	—	—	—	—	DNF	50	43

Legend
—	Did not compete
DNF	Did not finish
