= Dimitry Muravyev =

Kazakhstani road bicycle racer

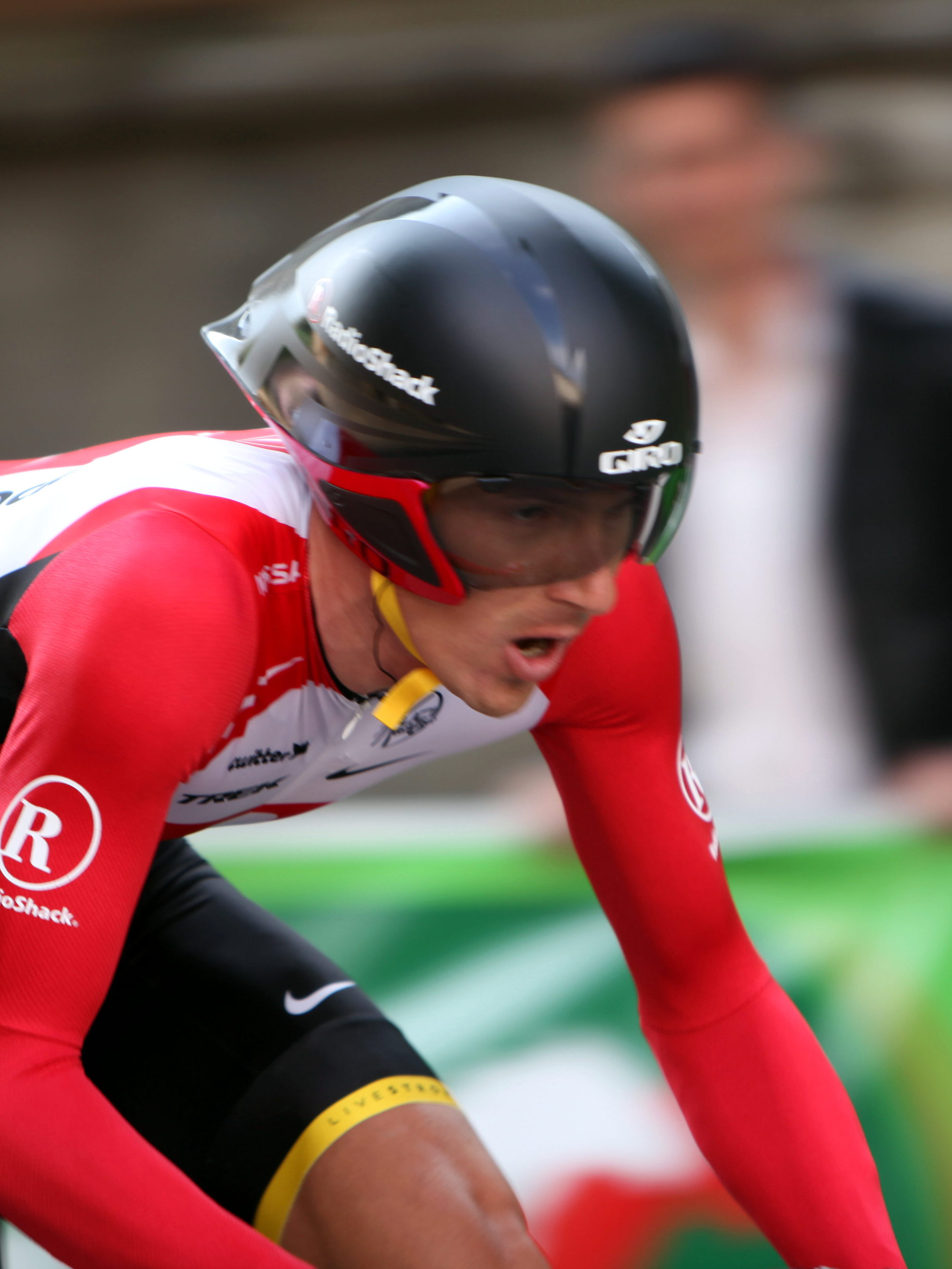
- Muravyev at the 2011 Tour de Romandie

Personal information
- Full name: Dimitry Murajev; Дмитрий Муравьёв
- Born: 2 November 1979 (age 46) Kazakh SSR, USSR
- Height: 1.89 m (6 ft 2 in)
- Weight: 75 kg (165 lb)

Cycling career
- Sport: Cycling
- Current team: Retired
- Discipline: Road
- Role: Rider

Professional teams
- 2002: Mapei–Quick-Step
- 2003: Quick-Step–Davitamon
- 2004–2005: Crédit Agricole
- 2006: Jartazi–7Mobile
- 2007–2009: Astana
- 2010–2011: Team RadioShack
- 2012–2014: Astana

Major wins
- National Road Race Championships (2002)

Dimitry Muravyev (Kazakh: Дмитрий Сергеевич Муравьёв, born 2 November 1979 in Kazakhstan) is a former professional road bicycle racer from Kazakhstan. He turned professional in 2002 and has ridden internationally since then, although his primary victories have been the Kazakhstan national road race (2002) and the Kazakhstan national time trial (three times, 2003–2005).

In 2007, he joined the newly formed Kazakh team Astana on the UCI ProTour, where he managed to place 8th in the 2007 Tour of Flanders and was a member of the winning team in the 2009 Tour de France. On 22 November 2009, it was reported that Muravyev had become one of the 12 members of Astana—and the only Kazakhstani—to rejoin former Astana team director Johan Bruyneel at Team RadioShack. Muravyev later rejoined Astana for the 2012 season.

== Career achievements ==
=== Major results ===
2002
1st Road race, National Road Championships
2003
1st Time trial, National Road Championships
1st Overall Ruban Granitier Breton

1st Prologue, Stages 4 & 6

1st Stage 1 Vuelta a Navarra
1st Stages 5 & 6 Tour des Pyrénées
2nd Overall Tour de Normandie
2004
1st Time trial, National Road Championships
2005
1st Time trial, National Road Championships
2006
2nd GP de Villers Cotterêts
2007
8th Tour of Flanders
2009
1st Stage 4 (TTT) Tour de France
2011
2nd Route Adélie de Vitré
7th Overall Three Days of De Panne
2012
2nd Druivenkoers-Overijse

=== Grand Tour general classification results timeline ===
Grand Tour	2005	2006	2007	2008	2009	2010	2011	2012	2013	2014
Giro d'Italia	92	—	51	—	—	—	—	—	—	—
Tour de France	—	—	—	—	148	148	129	—	167	—
Vuelta a España	—	—	—	131	—	—	—	—	—	—

Legend
—	Did not compete
DNF	Did not finish
