= 1992 Tour of Britain =

Race details
- Dates: 10–14 August 1992
- Stages: 5
- Winning time: 22h 23' 03"

Results
	Winner	Max Sciandri (ITA)	(Motorola)
	Second	Adri van der Poel (NED)	(Tulip Computers)
	Third	Hendrik Redant (BEL)	(Lotto–Mavic–MBK)
	Points	Max Sciandri (ITA)	(Motorola)
	Mountains	Cezary Zamana (POL)	(Subaru–Montgomery)
	Team	PDM–Ultima–Concorde	

The 1992 Tour of Britain was the sixth edition of the Kellogg's Tour of Britain cycle race and was held from 10 August to 14 August 1992. The race started in Dundee and finished in Leeds. The race was won by Max Sciandri of the Motorola team.

== Route ==
Stage characteristics and winners
Stage	Date	Course	Distance	Type	Winner
1	10 August	Dundee to Dundee	84 km (52.2 mi)		Hendrik Redant (BEL)
2	11 August	Edinburgh to Gateshead	214 km (133.0 mi)	Hilly stage	Max Sciandri (ITA)
3	12 August	Middlesbrough to Hull	165.5 km (102.8 mi)	Hilly stage	Djamolidine Abdoujaparov (UZB)
4	13 August	Lincoln to Coventry	183.6 km (114.1 mi)		Andrey Teteryuk (KAZ)
5	14 August	Nottingham to Leeds	190 km (118.1 mi)	Hilly stage	Hendrik Redant (BEL)

== General classification ==
Final general classification

Rank	Rider	Team	Time
1	Max Sciandri (ITA)	Motorola	22h 23' 03"
2	Adri van der Poel (NED)	Tulip Computers	+ 6"
3	Hendrik Redant (BEL)	Lotto–Mavic–MBK	+ 8"
4	Jos van Aert (NED)	PDM–Ultima–Concorde	+ 16"
5	Olaf Ludwig (GER)	Panasonic–Sportlife	+ 19"
6	Johan Museeuw (BEL)	Lotto–Mavic–MBK	+ 20"
7	Martin Earley (IRL)	PDM–Ultima–Concorde	+ 22"
8	Cezary Zamana (POL)	Subaru–Montgomery	+ 29"
9	Robert Millar (GBR)	TVM–Sanyo	+ 29"
10	Phil Anderson (AUS)	Motorola	+ 30"
