= Yuriy Yuda =

Kazakhstani cyclist

Personal information
- Born: 13 September 1983 (age 43) Pavlodar, Kazakhstan

Cycling career
- Sport: Cycling
- Current team: Retired
- Disciplines: Road and track
- Role: Rider

Amateur team
- 2004: Brisaspor

Professional team
- 2005–2006: Capec

Yuriy Yuda (Юрий Юрьевич Юда, born 13 September 1983) is a Kazakh former cyclist. He competed in the madison at the 2004 Summer Olympics.

== Major results ==
2003
1st Madison, Asian Track Championships
1st Stage 1 Jelajah Malaysia
3rd National Time Trial Championships
2004
3rd National Time Trial Championships
2005
3rd Grand Prix Criquielion
2006
3rd National Time Trial Championships
