= Dmitriy Gruzdev =

Kazakh cyclist

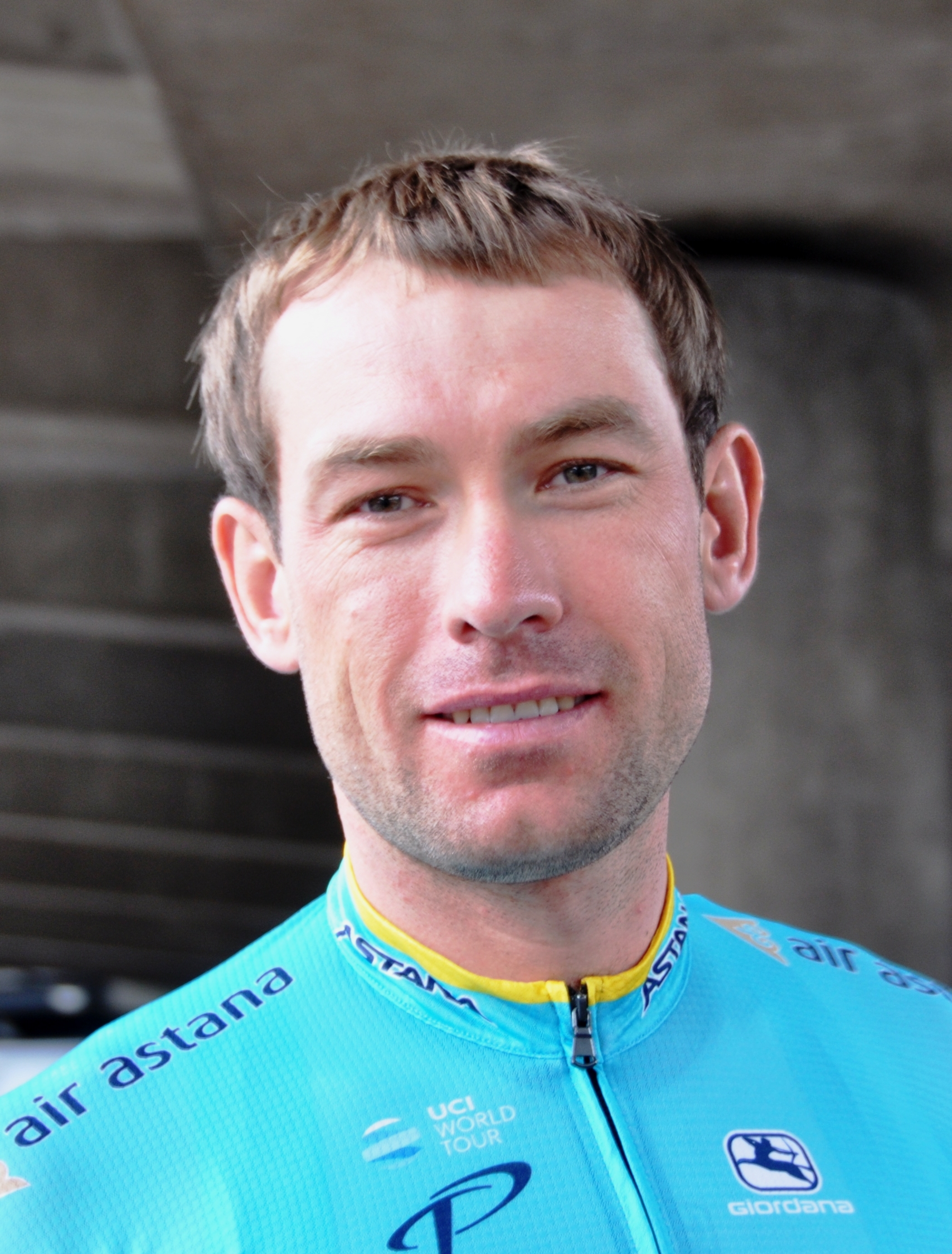
- Gruzdev at the 2017 Tour de France

Personal information
- Full name: Dmitriy Nikolayevich Gruzdev
- Born: 13 March 1986 (age 40): Tselinograd, Soviet Union; (now Astana, Kazakhstan)
- Height: 1.83 m (6 ft 0 in)
- Weight: 72 kg (159 lb)

Cycling career
- Sport: Cycling
- Discipline: Road
- Role: Rider

Professional teams
- 2006: Capec
- 2008: Ulan
- 2011: Astana (stagiaire)
- 2012–2024: Astana

Major wins
- One-day races and Classics National Road Race Championships (2024) National Time Trial Championships (2011, 2012, 2016, 2024)
Medal record
Representing Kazakhstan
Men's road bicycle racing
Asian Championships
Gold medal – first place	2014 Astana	Time trial
Gold medal – first place	2017 Manama	Time trial
Gold medal – first place	2017 Manama	Team time trial
Gold medal – first place	2019 Tashkent	Team time trial
Gold medal – first place	2023 Rayong	Mixed team relay
Gold medal – first place	2024 Almaty	Mixed team relay
Gold medal – first place	2025 Phitsanulok	Mixed team relay
Silver medal – second place	2011 Nakhon Ratchasima	Time trial
Silver medal – second place	2012 Kuala Lumpur	Time trial
Silver medal – second place	2024 Almaty	Time trial
Silver medal – second place	2025 Phitsanulok	Time trial
Bronze medal – third place	2005 Ludhiana	Road race
Bronze medal – third place	2014 Astana	Road race
Asian Games
Gold medal – first place	2006 Doha	Team time trial

Dmitriy Nikolayevich Gruzdev (Russian: Дми́трий Никола́евич Гру́здев, born 13 March 1986) is a Kazakhstani professional road bicycle racer, who last rode UCI WorldTeam Astana Qazaqstan Team. With ten professional wins, Gruzdev is a four-time winner of the Kazakhstan National Time Trial Championships, and he also won the Kazakhstan National Road Race Championships in 2024. He has also won six gold medals, across three different road events, at the Asian Cycling Championships.

== Major results ==
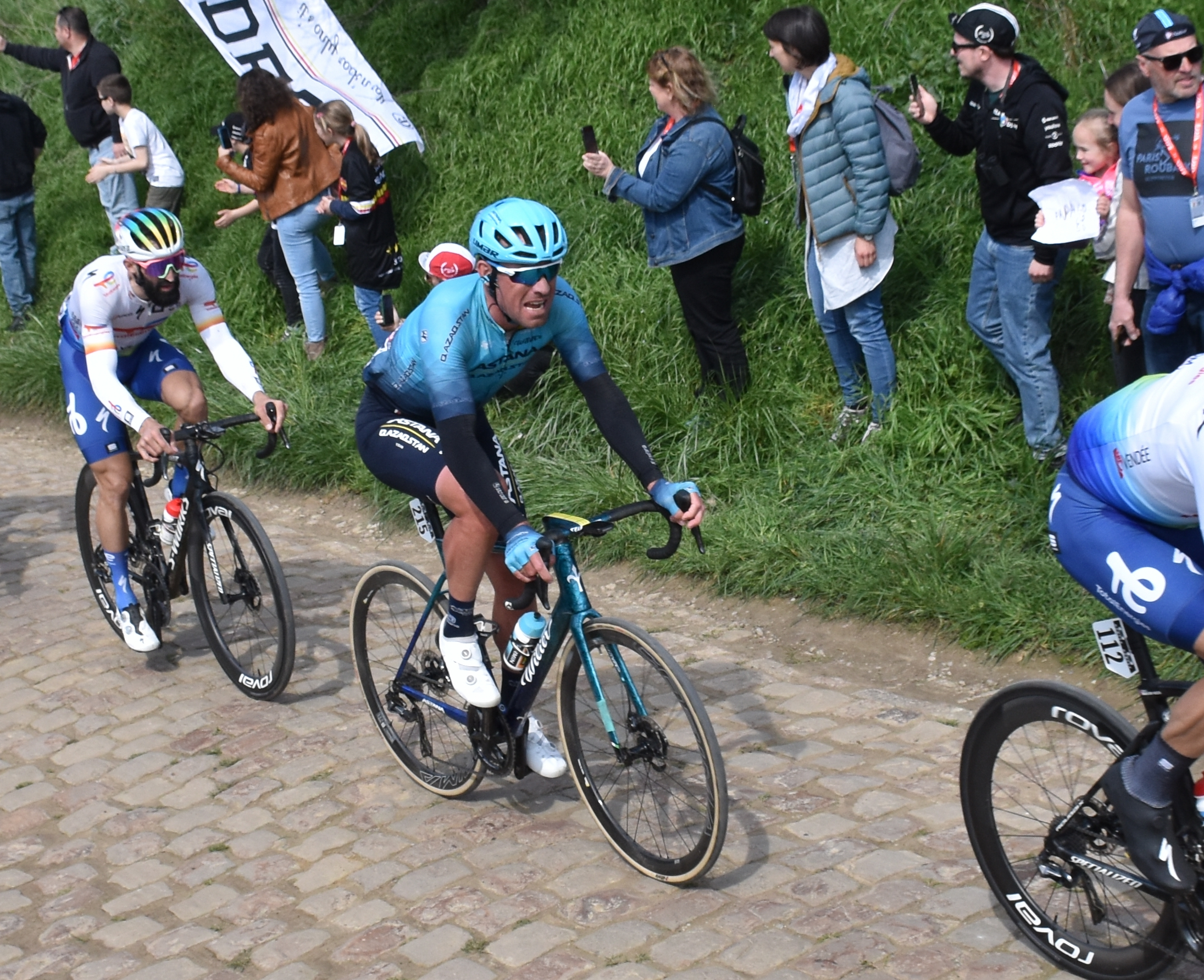
Gruzdev (centre) at the 2023 Paris–Roubaix

2005
3rd Road race, Asian Road Championships
2006
1st Team time trial, Asian Games
2007
2nd Time trial, National Road Championships
2008 (1 pro win)
4th Overall Tour of Hainan

1st Prologue

7th Grote 1-MeiPrijs
2009
3rd Road race, National Road Championships
2010
6th Road race, Asian Road Championships
2011 (1)
1st Time trial, National Road Championships
Asian Road Championships

2nd Time trial
5th Road race

2nd Overall Tour of Qinghai Lake
2012 (3)
1st Time trial, National Road Championships
1st Overall Tour of Hainan

1st Stage 7

2nd Time trial, Asian Road Championships
6th Time trial, UCI Road World Championships
2013
7th Tour of Almaty
2014 (1)
Asian Road Championships

1st Time trial
3rd Road race

2016 (1)
1st Time trial, National Road Championships
1st Stage 2 (TTT) Vuelta a Burgos
2017 (1)
Asian Road Championships

1st Time trial
1st Team time trial

2019
Asian Road Championships

1st Team time trial
5th Road race

National Road Championships

2nd Road race
2nd Time trial

2023
1st Team time trial, Asian Road Championships
2nd Time trial, National Road Championships
5th Road race, Asian Games
2024 (2)
Asian Road Championships

1st Team time trial
2nd Time trial

National Road Championships

1st Road race
1st Time trial

=== Grand Tour general classification results timeline ===
Grand Tour	2013	2014	2015	2016	2017	2018	2019	2020	2021	2022
Giro d'Italia	146	—	—	—	—	—	—	—	—	—
Tour de France	—	130	131	—	115	DNF	—	—	113	114
Vuelta a España	—	—	—	119	—	—	—	93	—	—

Legend
—	Did not compete
DNF	Did not finish
