= Zhandos Bizhigitov =

Kazakhstani cyclist (born 1991)

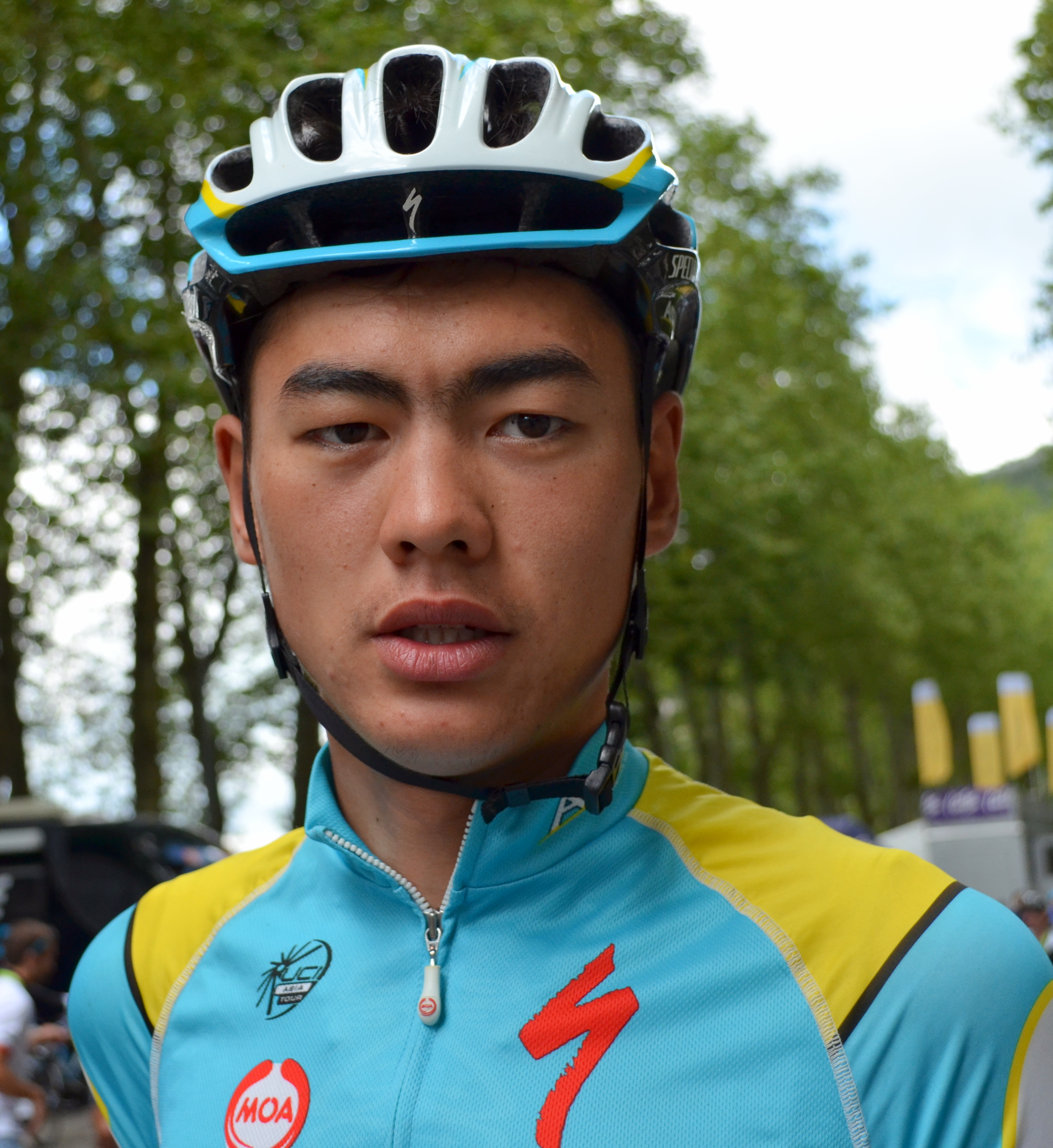
- Bizhigitov in 2014

Personal information
- Full name: Zhandos Ermuratovich Bizhigitov
- Born: 10 June 1991 (age 35): Petropavl, Kazakh SSR, Soviet Union; (now Kazakhstan)

Cycling career
- Sport: Cycling
- Current team: Retired
- Discipline: Road
- Role: Rider

Professional teams
- 2013–2014: Continental Team Astana
- 2015–2016: Vino 4ever
- 2016: Astana (stagiaire)
- 2017–2020: Astana
Medal record
Representing Kazakhstan
Men's road bicycle racing
Asian Championships
Gold medal – first place	2019 Tashkent	Team time trial
Gold medal – first place	2017 Manama	Team time trial
Silver medal – second place	2015 Nakhon Ratchasima	Time trial
Bronze medal – third place	2017 Manama	Road race

Zhandos Ermuratovich Bizhigitov (Kazakh: Жандос Ермуратович Бижігітов, Jandos Ermuratovich Bijıgıtov; born 10 June 1991) is a Kazakhstani former professional racing cyclist, who rode professionally between 2013 and 2020, for the Continental Team Astana, Vino 4ever SKO and Astana teams. He rode in the men's team time trial at the 2015 UCI Road World Championships. He was named in the start list for the 2017 Giro d'Italia.

== Major results ==
2013
9th Overall Tour d'Azerbaïdjan
9th Tour of Almaty
2014
10th Overall Vuelta a la Independencia Nacional
2015
Asian Road Championships

2nd Time trial
5th Road race

2nd Overall Black Sea Cycling Tour

1st Mountains classification

3rd Time trial, National Road Championships
7th Overall Tour of Szeklerland
8th Minsk Cup
10th Krasnodar–Anapa
2016
2nd Time trial, National Road Championships
2nd Overall Tour of Thailand
3rd Overall Tour of Bulgaria
6th Overall Tour de Korea

1st Stage 6

7th Overall Tour of Iran (Azerbaijan)
2017
Asian Road Championships

1st Team time trial
3rd Road race

1st Time trial, National Road Championships
2019
Asian Road Championships

1st Team time trial
4th Road race

=== Grand Tour general classification results timeline ===
Grand Tour	2017
Giro d'Italia	160
Tour de France	—
Vuelta a España	—

Legend
—	Did not compete
DNF	Did not finish
