= Kazakhstan National Time Trial Championships =

National road cycling championship in Kazakhstan

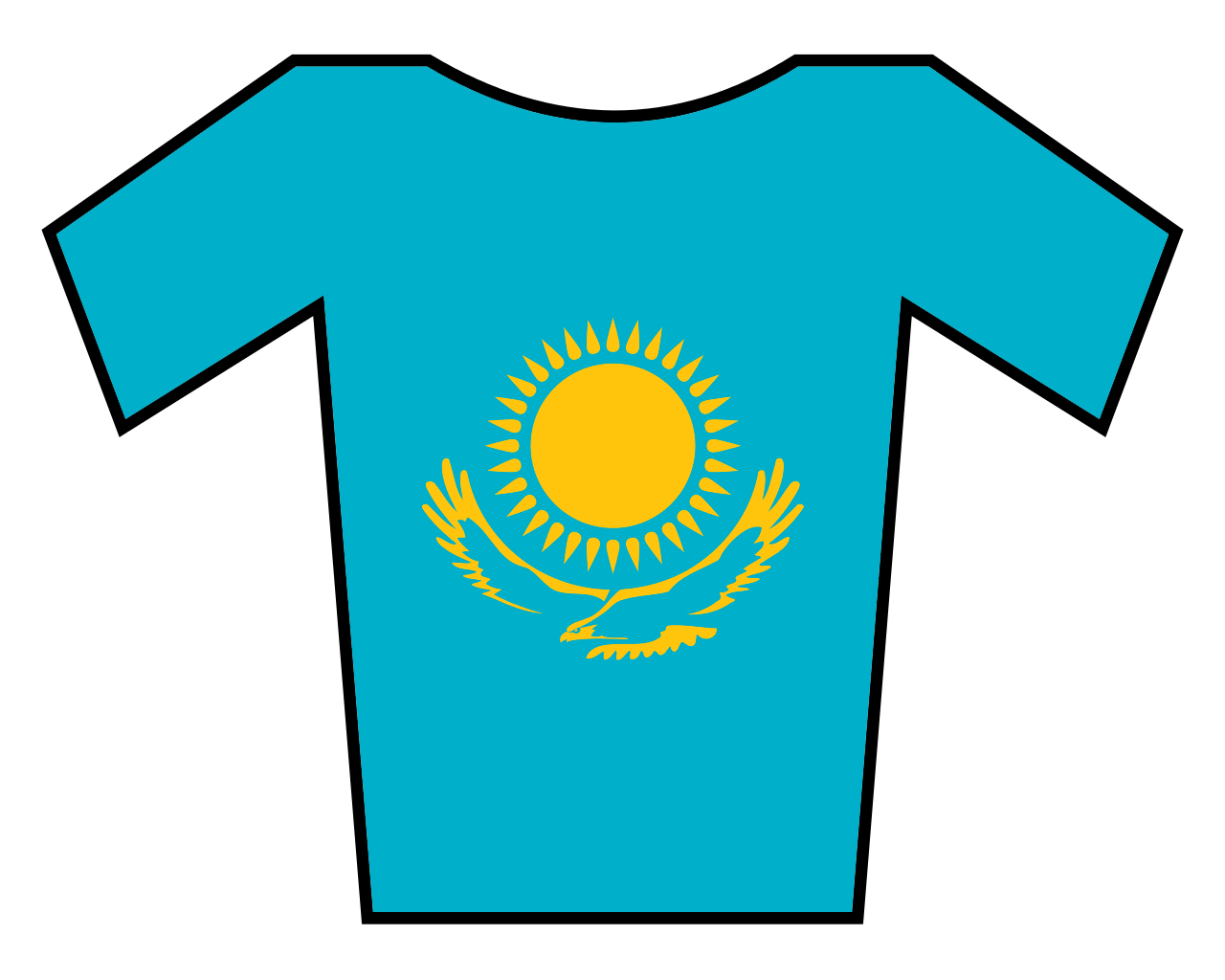
The champions jersey

The Kazakhstan National Time Trial Championships are held annually to decide the Kazakh cycling champions in the individual time trial discipline, across various categories. The winner of the event earns the right to wear the national champion's jersey in individual time trial competitions during the following season. The championship is run as a solo race against the clock on a designated course, with riders starting at fixed intervals. This race has been held annually since 1999, with the exception of 2020, when it was not held due to the COVID-19 pandemic in Kazakhstan.

== Multiple winners ==
Riders that won the race more than once.

Name	Wins	Years
Andrey Mizurov	6	1999, 2002, 2008–2010, 2013
Dmitriy Gruzdev	4	2011, 2012, 2016, 2024
Daniil Fominykh	3	2014, 2018, 2021
Dimitry Muravyev	2	2003, 2005
Alexey Lutsenko	2	2019, 2023

== Men ==
Year	Gold	Silver	Bronze
1999	Andrey Mizurov	Dmitry Fofonov	Andrey Teteryuk
2000	Dmitry Fofonov	Sergei Yakovlev	Andrey Mizurov
2001	Vadim Kravchenko	Serguei Derevyanov	Pavel Nevdakh
2002	Andrey Mizurov	Dimitry Muravyev	Pavel Nevdakh
2003	Dimitry Muravyev	Sergey Lavrenenko	Yuriy Yuda
2004	Pavel Nevdakh	Andrey Mizurov	Yuriy Yuda
2005	Dimitry Muravyev	Maxim Iglinsky	Maxim Gourov
2006	Maxim Iglinsky	Dimitry Muravyev	Yuriy Yuda
2007	Alexsandr Dyachenko	Dmitriy Gruzdev	Andrey Mizurov
2008	Andrey Mizurov	Andrey Zeits	Roman Kireyev
2009	Andrey Mizurov	Roman Kireyev	Andrey Zeits
2010	Andrey Mizurov	Roman Kireyev	Daniil Fominykh
2011	Dmitriy Gruzdev	Andrey Mizurov	Alexsandr Dyachenko
2012	Dmitriy Gruzdev	Alexey Lutsenko	Daniil Fominykh
2013	Andrey Mizurov	Alexsandr Dyachenko	Daniil Fominykh
2014	Daniil Fominykh	Oleg Zemlyakov	Dmitriy Rive
2015	Alexey Lutsenko	Daniil Fominykh	Zhandos Bizhigitov
2016	Dmitriy Gruzdev	Zhandos Bizhigitov	Nikita Stalnov
2017	Zhandos Bizhigitov	Nikita Stalnov	Artyom Zakharov
2018	Daniil Fominykh	Igor Chzhan	Andrey Zeits
2019	Alexey Lutsenko	Dmitriy Gruzdev	Daniil Fominykh
2020	Not held due to the COVID-19 pandemic in Kazakhstan		
2021	Daniil Fominykh	Yevgeniy Fedorov	Yuriy Natarov
2022	Yuriy Natarov	Igor Chzhan	Anton Kuzmin
2023	Alexey Lutsenko	Dmitriy Gruzdev	Anton Kuzmin
2024	Dmitriy Gruzdev	Igor Chzhan	Gleb Brussenskiy
2025	Yevgeniy Fedorov	Daniil Pronskiy	Anton Kuzmin

== See also ==
- Kazakhstan National Road Race Championships
