= Daniil Fominykh =

Kazakhstani cyclist (born 1991)

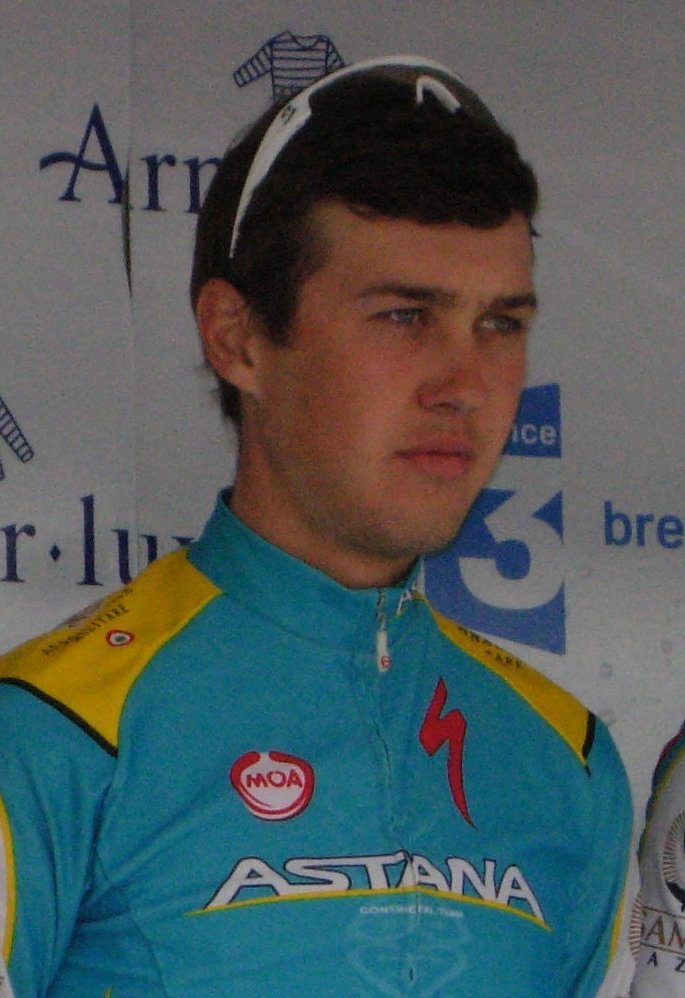
- Fominykh at the 2013 Tour de Bretagne

Personal information
- Full name: Daniil Sergeyevich Fominykh
- Born: 28 August 1991 (age 35): Ust-Kamenogorsk, East Kazakhstan Oblast, Kazakh SSR, Soviet Union; (now Kazakhstan)
- Height: 1.85 m (6 ft 1 in)
- Weight: 70 kg (154 lb)

Cycling career
- Sport: Cycling
- Current team: Almaty Continental Team
- Discipline: Road
- Role: Rider (retired); Directeur sportif

Professional teams
- 2012–2013: Continental Team Astana
- 2014–2020: Astana
- 2021: Almaty Cycling Team

Managerial team
- 2022–: Almaty Cycling Team

Major wins
- One-day races and Classics National Time Trial Championships (2014, 2018, 2021)
Medal record
Representing Kazakhstan
Road cycling
Asian Championships
Gold medal – first place	2013 New Delhi	Under-23 time trial
Gold medal – first place	2017 Manama	Team time trial
Gold medal – first place	2019 Tashkent	Elite time trial
Silver medal – second place	2009 Tenggarong	Junior road race

Daniil Sergeyevich Fominykh (Russian: Даниил Сергеевич Фоминых; born 28 August 1991) is a Kazakh former road cyclist, who competed as a professional from 2012 to 2021. He now works as a directeur sportif for UCI Continental team Almaty Continental Team.

== Major results ==
2008
3rd Overall Coupe des Nations Abitibi
2010
3rd Time trial, National Road Championships
2012
3rd Time trial, National Road Championships
9th Overall Thüringen Rundfahrt der U23
2013
1st Time trial, Asian Under-23 Road Championships
3rd Time trial, National Road Championships
3rd Overall Tour of Qinghai Lake
9th Time trial, UCI Under-23 Road World Championships
2014
1st Time trial, National Road Championships
2015
2nd Time trial, National Road Championships
2016
1st Stage 2 (TTT) Vuelta a Burgos
2017
1st Team time trial, Asian Road Championships
4th Road race, National Road Championships
2018
1st Time trial, National Road Championships
2019
Asian Road Championships

1st Time trial
1st Team time trial
6th Road race

3rd Time trial, National Road Championships
2021
1st Time trial, National Road Championships
