= Dmitry Fofonov =

Kazakhstani road bicycle racer

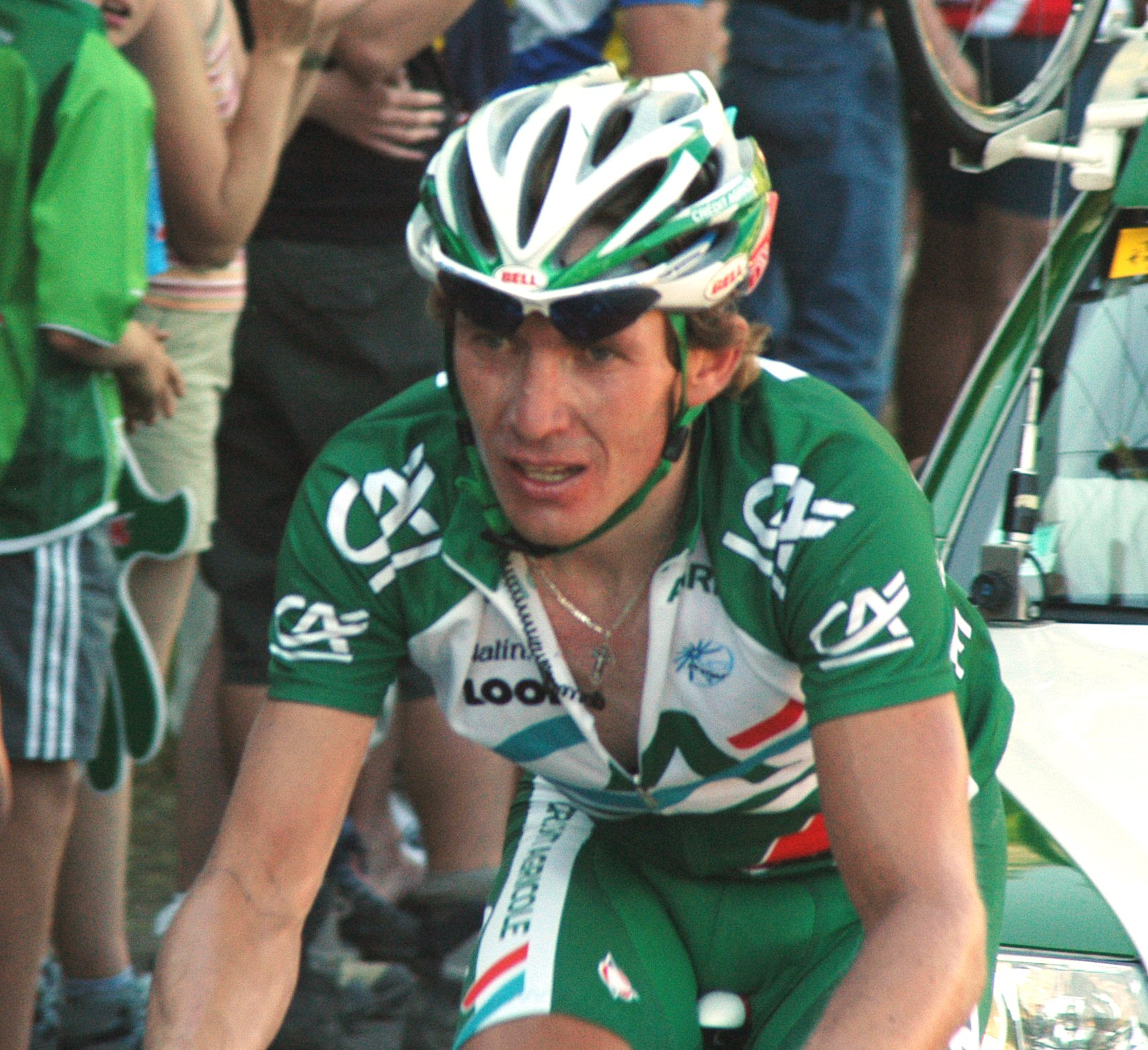
- Fofonov at the 2007 Tour de France

Personal information
- Full name: Dmitry Fofonov; Дмитрий Фофонов
- Born: 15 August 1976 (age 50) Almaty, Soviet Union
- Height: 1.75 m (5 ft 9 in)
- Weight: 64 kg (141 lb)

Cycling career
- Sport: Cycling
- Current team: XDS Astana Team
- Discipline: Road
- Role: Rider (retired) directeur sportif

Professional teams
- 1999: Collstrop
- 2000: Besson Chaussures
- 2001–2005: Cofidis
- 2006–2008: Crédit Agricole
- 2010–2012: Astana

Managerial team
- 2013–: Astana

Dmitry Fofonov (Kazakh: Дмитрий Фофонов, romanized: Dmitriy Fofonov; born 15 August 1976 in Almaty) is a former Kazakh professional road bicycle racer who was fired from UCI ProTeam Crédit Agricole for doping.

Fofonov tested positive for heptaminol after the 18th stage of the 2008 Tour de France. Fofonov had completed the race in 19th place, and was fired by Crédit Agricole after the test. After his doping ban ended, Fofonov joined the Astana team for the 2010 season. He retired after the 2012 season and became an assistant sporting director for Astana.

== Major results ==
1998
Kazakhstan Sprint Champion
1st, Touf of China
1st, Stage 15, Commonwealth Bank Classic
2000
Kazakhstan Sprint Champion
1st, Zellik–Galmaarden
2001
57th, Vuelta a España
2002
14th, Volta a Catalunya

Winner Stage 7

2004
4th, Züri-Metzgete
87th, Tour de France
2005
4th, National Road Race Championship
89th, Giro d'Italia
2006
20th, Paris–Nice
32nd, Vuelta a España
2007
16th, Critérium du Dauphiné Libéré
2008
19th overall, Tour de France
2009
1st, Asian Cycling Championships Road Race

== See also ==
- List of doping cases in cycling
