= Kazakhstan National Road Race Championships =

National road cycling championship in Kazakhstan

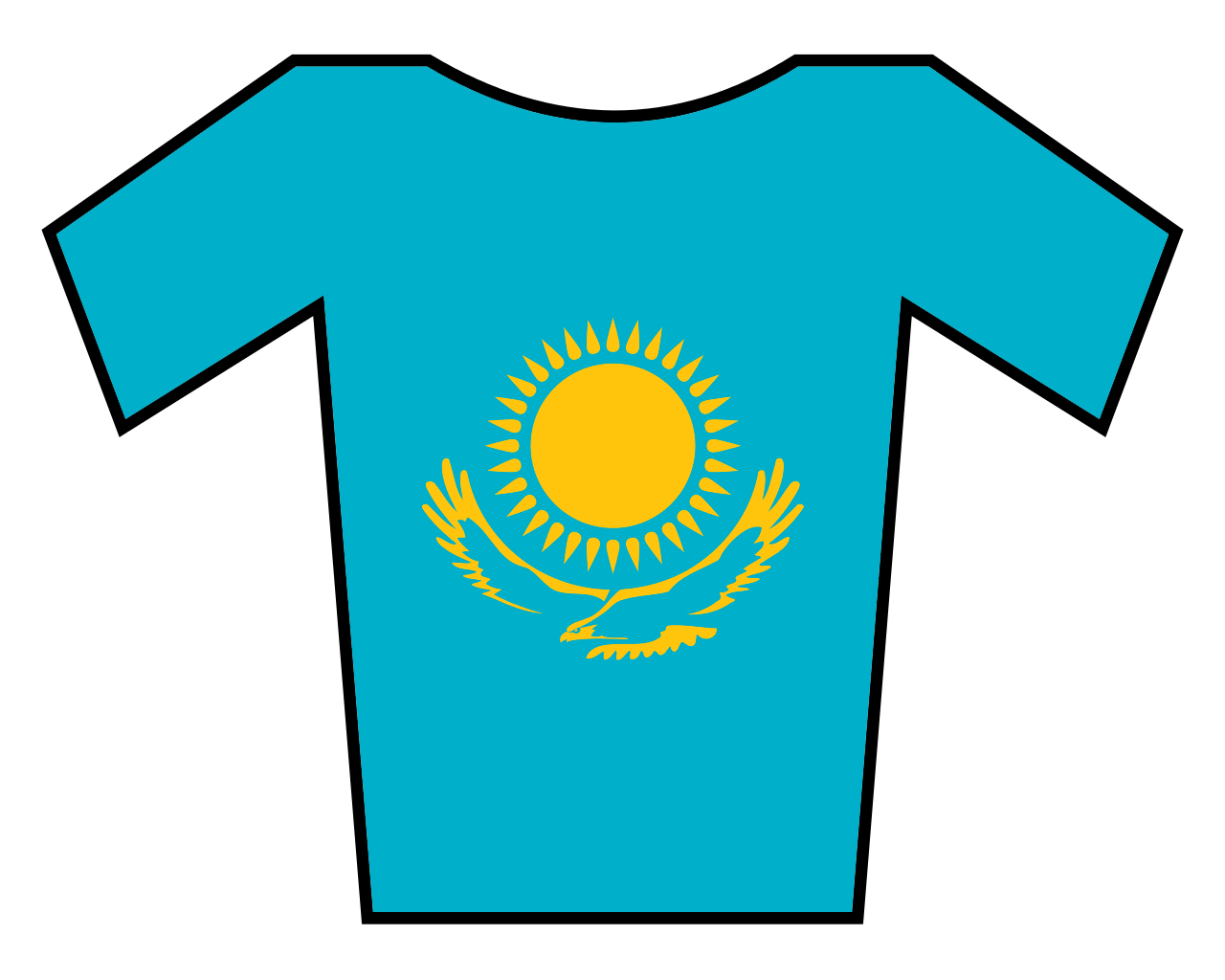
The champions jersey

The Kazakhstan National Road Race Championships are held annually to decide the Kazakh cycling champions in the road race discipline, across various categories.

== Multiple winners ==
Riders that won the race more than once.

Name	Wins	Years
Andrey Mizurov	3	2001, 2004, 2011
Assan Bazayev	2	2008, 2012
Alexey Lutsenko	2	2018, 2019, 2023
Sergei Yakovlev	2	1997, 2000
Yevgeniy Fedorov	2	2021, 2025

== Men ==
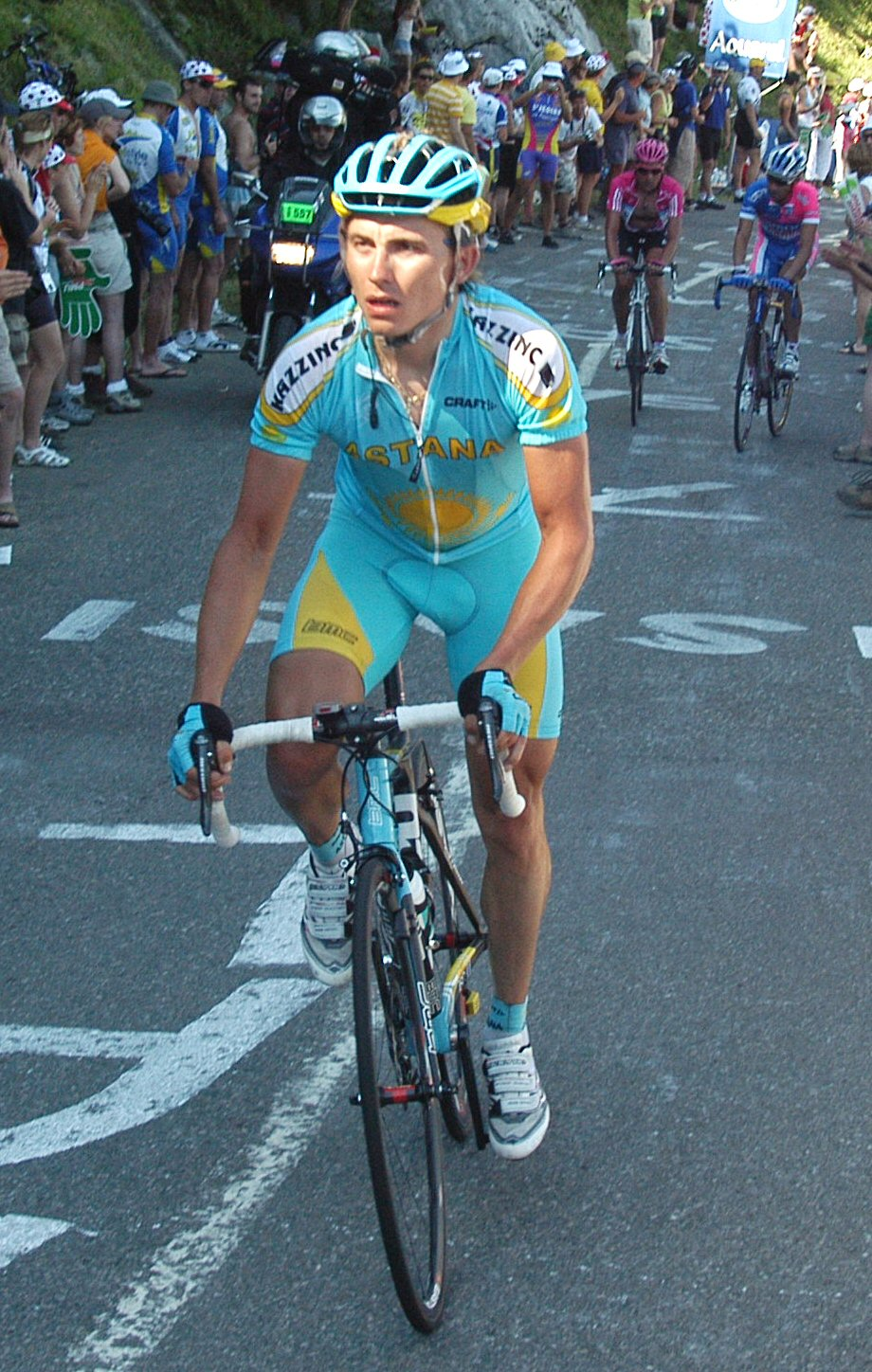
Maxim Iglinsky, who won the title in 2007

Year	Gold	Silver	Bronze
1997	Sergei Yakovlev	Dmitry Fofonov	Alexander Nadobenko
1998	Sergey Belousov	Valeriy Titov	Konstantin Kuznetsov
1999	Andrey Teteryuk	Dimitry Muravyev	Pavel Nevdakh
2000	Sergei Yakovlev	Andrey Mizurov	Andrey Teteryuk
2001	Andrey Mizurov	Sergei Yakovlev	Valery Titov
2002	Dimitry Muravyev	Pavel Nevdakh	Kairat Baigudinov
2003	Pavel Nevdakh	Vadim Gorbachevskiy	Valentin Iglinsky
2004	Andrey Mizurov	Andrey Kashechkin	Maxim Iglinsky
2005	Alexander Vinokourov	Andrey Mizurov	Andrey Kashechkin
2006	Andrey Kashechkin	Alexander Vinokourov	Maxim Iglinsky
2007	Maxim Iglinsky	Andrey Mizurov	Valentin Iglinsky
2008	Assan Bazayev	Sergey Renev	Maxim Gourov
2009	Dmitry Fofonov	Maxim Gourov	Dmitriy Gruzdev
2010	Maxim Gourov	Assan Bazayev	Vladislav Gorbunov
2011	Andrey Mizurov	Alexandr Shushemoin	Ruslan Tleubayev
2012	Assan Bazayev	Alexey Lutsenko	Abdraimzhan Ishanov
2013	Alexsandr Dyachenko	Sergey Renev	Tilegen Maidos
2014	Ilya Davidenok	Alexandr Shushemoin	Nurbolat Kulimbetov
2015	Oleg Zemlyakov	Dmitry Lukyanov	Stepan Astafyev
2016	Arman Kamyshev	Alexandr Shushemoin	Matvey Nikitin
2017	Artyom Zakharov	Alisher Zhumakan	Grigoriy Shtein
2018	Alexey Lutsenko	Nikita Stalnov	Artyom Zakharov
2019	Alexey Lutsenko	Dmitriy Gruzdev	Anton Kuzmin
2020	Not held due to the COVID-19 pandemic in Kazakhstan		
2021	Yevgeniy Fedorov	Yevgeniy Gidich	Artyom Zakharov
2022	Yevgeniy Gidich	Artyom Zakharov	Gleb Brussenskiy
2023	Alexey Lutsenko	Yevgeniy Gidich	Daniil Marukhin
2024	Dmitriy Gruzdev	Gleb Brussenskiy	Iogan Shtein
2025	Yevgeniy Fedorov	Anton Kuzmin	Daniil Marukhin

== See also ==
- Kazakhstan National Time Trial Championships
