= Tour of Almaty =

Kazakh multi-day road cycling race

Race details
- Date: October (2013–2016); September (2017–2018); August (2019)
- Region: Kazakhstan
- Local name(s): Тур Алматы
- Discipline: Road
- Competition: UCI Asia Tour 2.1
- Type: One-day race (2013–2016); Stage race (2017–present)

History
- First edition: 2013
- Editions: 7 (as of 2019)
- First winner: Maxim Iglinsky (KAZ)
- Most wins: Alexey Lutsenko (KAZ) (4 wins)
- Most recent: Yuriy Natarov (KAZ)

The Tour of Almaty is an annual professional road bicycle racing stage race held in Kazakhstan. It is sanctioned by the International Cycling Union (UCI) as a 2.1 race, as part of the UCI Asia Tour. From 2013 to 2016, the race was held as a one-day race, before moving to its current two-day format in 2017.

== History ==
=== 2014 ===
In 2014 the 2nd annual Tour of Almaty was organized by the Almaty Akimat and the Kazakhstan Cycling Federation. It was broadcast live by Eurosport, KazSport and Almaty channels. More than 20 teams, including Astana Pro Team, competed in the race. The event coincided with the 100 year anniversary of cycling in Kazakhstan. Astana team rider and 2014 Asian Games time trial champion Alexey Lutsenko won the race.

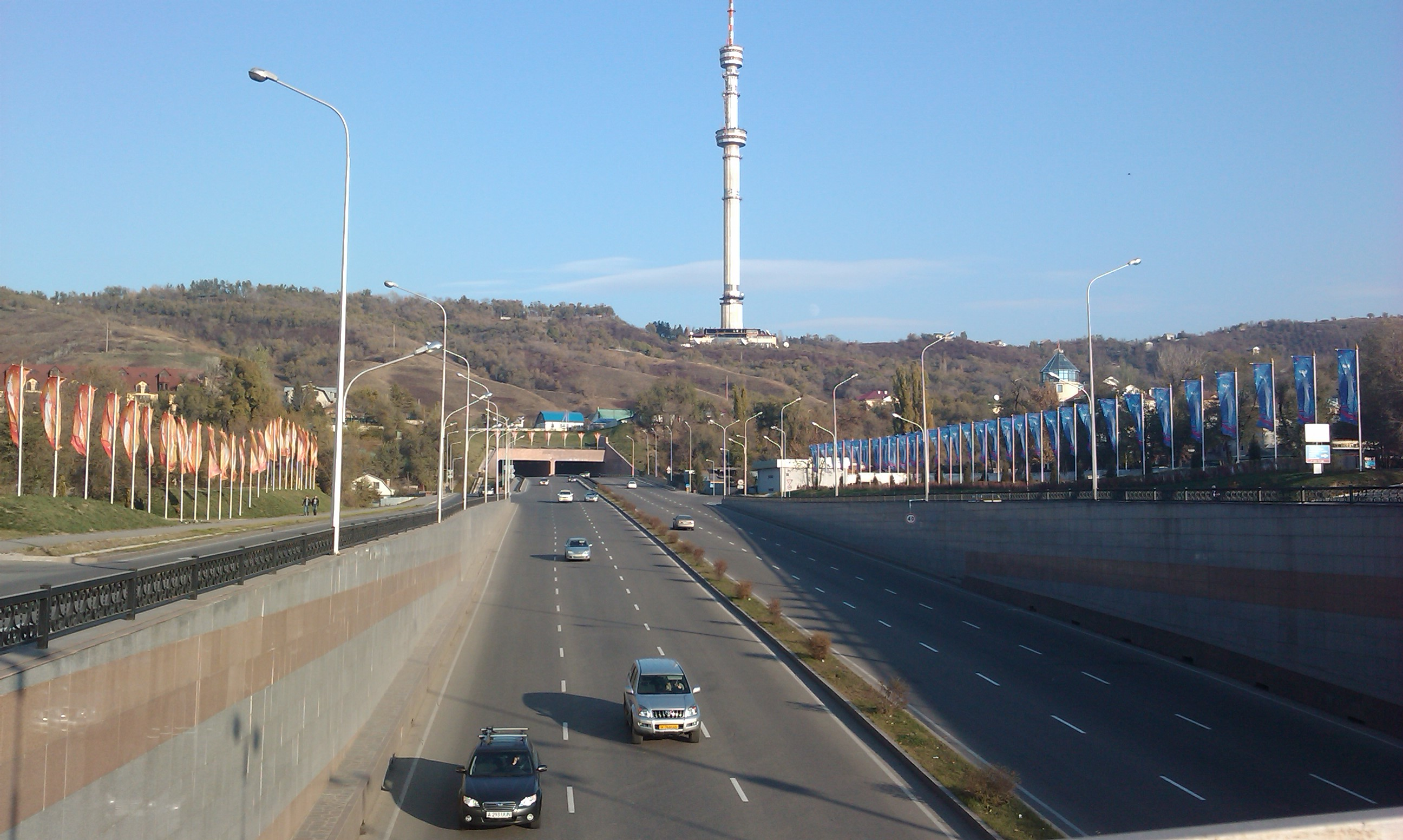
Tour of Almaty, Part of the route

== Past winners ==
Year	Country	Rider	Team
2013	Kazakhstan	Maxim Iglinsky	Kazakhstan national team
2014	Kazakhstan	Alexey Lutsenko	Astana
2015	Kazakhstan	Alexey Lutsenko	Astana
2016	Kazakhstan	Alexey Lutsenko	Astana
2017	Kazakhstan	Alexey Lutsenko	Astana
2018	Italy	Davide Villella	Astana
2019	Kazakhstan	Yuriy Natarov	Astana
