= 2022 Astana Qazaqstan Team season =

Astana Qazaqstan Team
- 2022 season
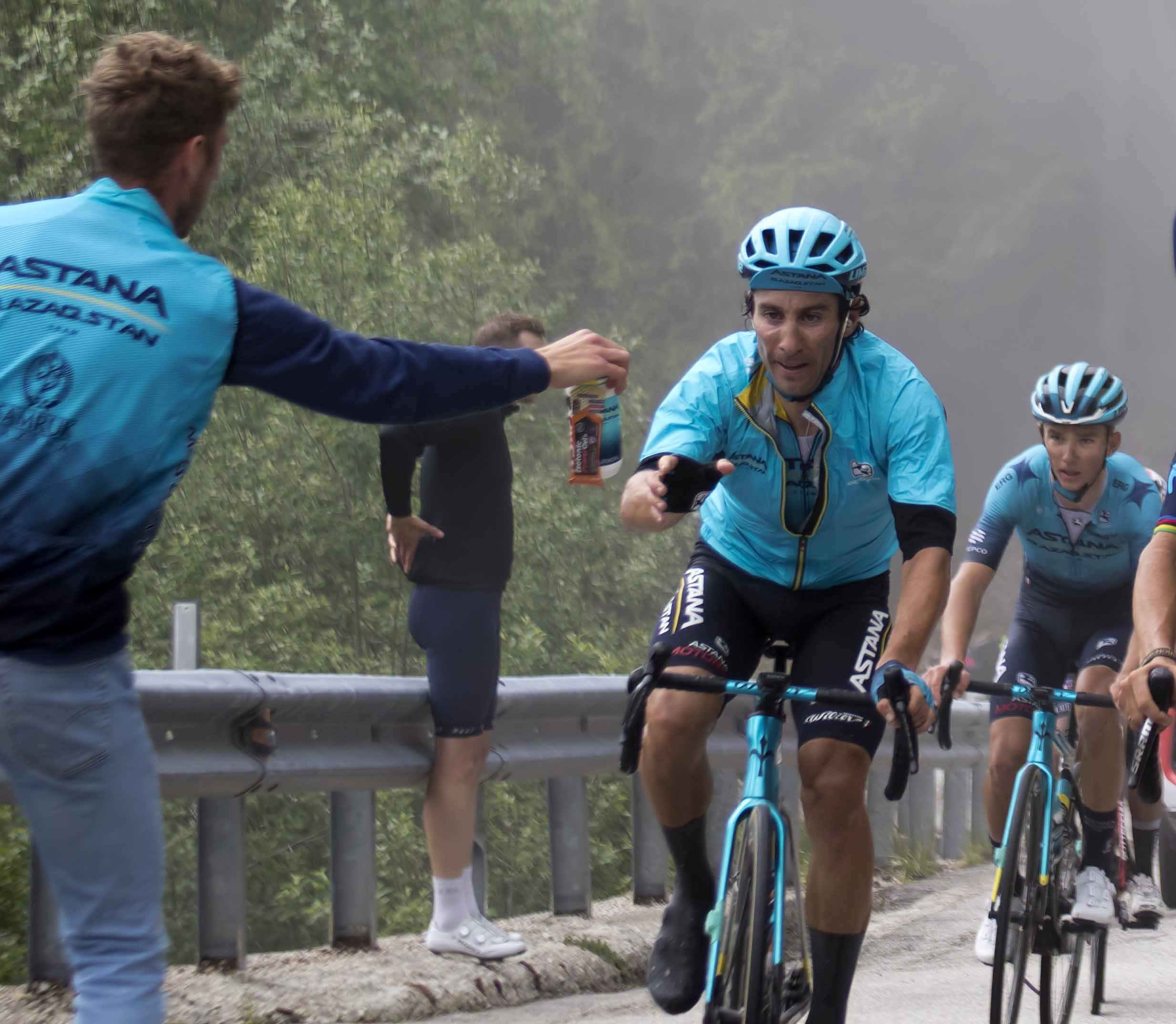
- Astana on Stage 17 Giro d'Italia
- UCI code: AST
- Status: UCI WorldTeam
- Chairman: Alexander Vinokourov (KAZ)
- Main sponsor(s): Samruk-Kazyna
- Based: Kazakhstan
- Bicycles: Wilier Triestina
- Groupset: Shimano

Season victories
- One-day races: 2
- Stage race stages: 1
- Jersey

The 2022 season for the Astana Qazaqstan Team is its 16th season, all of which have been as a UCI WorldTeam. The team returned to a name that represents the country of Kazakhstan after the team had two main sponsors in 2021. Canadian tech company Premier Tech exited after one year amidst disagreements and subsequently sponsored Israel–Premier Tech, the team formerly known as Israel Start-Up Nation. They use Wilier bicycles, Shimano drivetrain, Corima wheels and Giordana clothing.

== Team roster ==
As of 3 January 2022.

Rider	Date of birth
Leonardo Basso (ITA)	25 December 1993 (aged 28)
Samuele Battistella (ITA)	14 November 1998 (aged 23)
Manuele Boaro (ITA)	12 March 1987 (aged 34)
Gleb Brussenskiy (KAZ)	18 April 2000 (aged 21)
Valerio Conti (ITA)	30 March 1993 (aged 28)
Stefan de Bod (RSA)	17 November 1996 (aged 25)
David de la Cruz (ESP)	6 May 1989 (aged 32)
Joe Dombrowski (USA)	12 May 1991 (aged 30)
Yevgeniy Fedorov (KAZ)	16 February 2000 (aged 21)
Fabio Felline (ITA)	29 March 1990 (aged 31)
Michele Gazzoli (ITA)	14 March 1999 (aged 22)
Yevgeniy Gidich (KAZ)	19 May 1996 (aged 25)
Dmitriy Gruzdev (KAZ)	13 March 1986 (aged 35)
Sebastián Henao (COL)	5 August 1993 (aged 28)
Miguel Ángel López (Note: Suspended between 22 July - 1 August after Spanish reports links him to drug trafficking case) (COL)	4 April 1994 (aged 27)

Rider	Date of birth
Alexey Lutsenko (KAZ)	7 September 1992 (aged 29)
Davide Martinelli (ITA)	31 May 1993 (aged 28)
Gianni Moscon (ITA)	20 April 1994 (aged 27)
Yuriy Natarov (KAZ)	28 December 1996 (aged 25)
Antonio Nibali (ITA)	23 September 1992 (aged 29)
Vincenzo Nibali (ITA)	14 November 1984 (aged 37)
Nurbergen Nurlykhassym (KAZ)	25 March 2000 (aged 21)
Vadim Pronskiy (KAZ)	4 June 1998 (aged 23)
Alexandr Riabushenko (Note: As of 1 March 2022, the UCI announced that cyclists from Russia and Belarus would no longer compete under the name or flag of those respective countries due to the Russian invasion of Ukraine.) (blank)	12 October 1995 (aged 26)
Javier Romo (ESP)	6 January 1999 (aged 22)
Harold Tejada (COL)	27 April 1997 (aged 24)
Simone Velasco (ITA)	2 December 1995 (aged 26)
Artyom Zakharov (KAZ)	27 October 1991 (aged 30)
Andrey Zeits (KAZ)	14 December 1986 (aged 35)

Riders who joined the team for the 2022 season

Rider	2021 team
Leonardo Basso	INEOS Grenadiers
Valerio Conti	UAE Team Emirates
David de la Cruz	UAE Team Emirates
Joe Dombrowski	UAE Team Emirates
Michele Gazzoli	neo-pro (Team Colpack–Ballan)
Sebastián Henao	INEOS Grenadiers
Miguel Ángel López	Movistar Team
Gianni Moscon	INEOS Grenadiers
Antonio Nibali	Trek–Segafredo
Vincenzo Nibali	Trek–Segafredo
Nurbergen Nurlykhassym	neo-pro (Vino–Astana Motors)
Alexandr Riabushenko	UAE Team Emirates
Simone Velasco	Gazprom–RusVelo
Andrey Zeits	Team BikeExchange

Riders who left the team during or after the 2021 season

Rider	2022 team
Alex Aranburu	Movistar Team
Rodrigo Contreras	EPM–Scott
Omar Fraile	INEOS Grenadiers
Jakob Fuglsang	Israel–Premier Tech
Jonas Gregaard	Uno-X Pro Cycling Team
Hugo Houle	Israel–Premier Tech
Gorka Izagirre	Movistar Team
Ion Izagirre	Cofidis
Merhawi Kudus	EF Education–EasyPost
Ben Perry	WiV SunGod
Andrea Piccolo (Note: Piccolo left the team on 31 May 2021, having not competed for the team at all after health issues were detected during an early season training camp.)	Gazprom–RusVelo
Óscar Rodríguez	Movistar Team
Luis León Sánchez	Team Bahrain Victorious
Nikita Stalnov	Retired
Matteo Sobrero	Team BikeExchange–Jayco
Aleksandr Vlasov	Bora–Hansgrohe

== Season victories ==
Date	Race	Competition	Rider	Country	Location	Ref.
14 February	Clásica Jaén	UCI Europe Tour	Alexey Lutsenko (KAZ)	Spain	Úbeda	
20 February	Vuelta a Andalucía, Team classification	UCI ProSeries	(Note: The riders in the squad were Gleb Brussenskiy, Yevgeniy Fedorov, Miguel Ángel López, Alexey Lutsenko, Nurbergen Nurlykhassym, Harold Tejada, and Simone Velasco.)	Spain		
15 April	Giro di Sicilia, Team classification	UCI Europe Tour	(Note: The riders in the squad were Valerio Conti, Juan Carlos López, Antonio Nibali, Vincenzo Nibali, Simone Velasco, Alexandre Vinokurov, and Andrey Zeits.)	Italy		
21 April	Tour of the Alps, Stage 4	UCI ProSeries	Miguel Ángel López (COL)	Austria	Kals am Grossglockner	
30 May	Cycling Stars Criterium - Valdobbiadene	UCI Europe Tour	Vincenzo Nibali (ITA)	Italy	Valdobbiadene	

== National, Continental, and World Champions ==
Date	Discipline	Jersey	Rider	Country	Location	Ref.
27 March	Asian Road Race Championships		Yevgeniy Fedorov (KAZ)	Tajikistan	Dushanbe	
