= 2021 Astana–Premier Tech season =

Astana–Premier Tech
- 2021 season
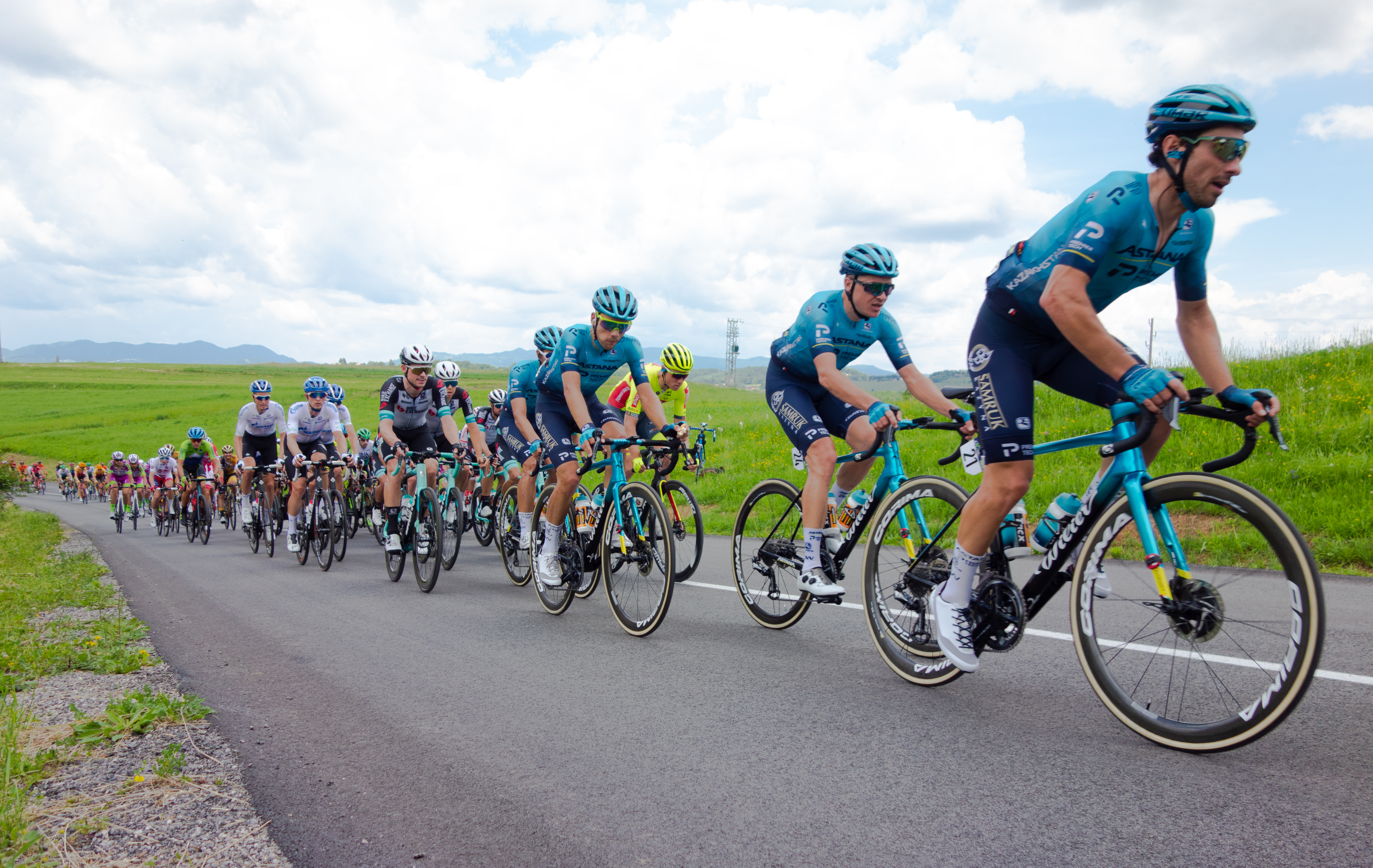
- Astana–Premier Tech in the peloton at Raka on Stage 3 of the Tour of Slovenia
- UCI code: APT
- Status: UCI WorldTeam
- World Tour Rank: 13th
- Chairman: Alexander Vinokourov (KAZ)
- Main sponsor(s): Samruk-Kazyna; Premier Tech
- Based: Kazakhstan
- Bicycles: Wilier Triestina
- Groupset: Shimano

Season victories
- One-day races: 3
- Stage race stages: 3
- National Championships: 7
- Most wins: Ion Izagirre (ESP); Alexey Lutsenko (KAZ); Aleksandr Vlasov (RUS); (2 each)
- Best ranked rider: Aleksandr Vlasov (RUS) (35th)
- Jersey

The 2021 season for the Astana–Premier Tech cycling team was its 15th season, all of which have been as a UCI WorldTeam. For the first season in its existence, however, the team had two title sponsors, as Canadian tech company Premier Tech joins longtime Kazakh sponsor Samruk-Kazyna.

== Team roster ==
As of 10 June 2021.

Rider	Date of birth
Alex Aranburu (ESP)	19 September 1995 (aged 25)
Samuele Battistella (ITA)	14 November 1998 (aged 22)
Manuele Boaro (ITA)	12 March 1987 (aged 33)
Gleb Brussenskiy (KAZ)	18 April 2000 (aged 20)
Rodrigo Contreras (COL)	2 June 1994 (aged 26)
Stefan de Bod (RSA)	17 November 1996 (aged 24)
Yevgeniy Fedorov (KAZ)	16 February 2000 (aged 20)
Fabio Felline (ITA)	29 March 1990 (aged 30)
Omar Fraile (ESP)	17 July 1990 (aged 30)
Jakob Fuglsang (DEN)	22 March 1985 (aged 35)
Yevgeniy Gidich (KAZ)	19 May 1996 (aged 24)
Jonas Gregaard (DEN)	30 July 1996 (aged 24)
Dmitriy Gruzdev (KAZ)	13 March 1986 (aged 34)
Hugo Houle (CAN)	27 September 1990 (aged 30)
Ion Izagirre (ESP)	4 February 1989 (aged 31)
Gorka Izagirre (ESP)	7 October 1987 (aged 33)

Rider	Date of birth
Merhawi Kudus (ERI)	23 January 1994 (aged 26)
Alexey Lutsenko (KAZ)	7 September 1992 (aged 28)
Davide Martinelli (ITA)	31 May 1993 (aged 27)
Yuriy Natarov (KAZ)	28 December 1996 (aged 24)
Ben Perry (CAN)	7 March 1994 (aged 26)
Andrea Piccolo (Note: Piccolo left the team on 31 May, having not competed for the team at all after health issues were detected during an early season training camp.) (ITA)	23 March 2001 (aged 19)
Vadim Pronskiy (KAZ)	4 June 1998 (aged 22)
Óscar Rodríguez (ESP)	6 May 1995 (aged 25)
Javier Romo (ESP)	6 January 1999 (aged 21)
Luis León Sánchez (ESP)	24 November 1983 (aged 37)
Matteo Sobrero (ITA)	14 May 1997 (aged 23)
Nikita Stalnov (KAZ)	14 September 1991 (aged 29)
Harold Tejada (COL)	27 April 1997 (aged 23)
Aleksandr Vlasov (RUS)	23 April 1996 (aged 24)
Artyom Zakharov (KAZ)	27 October 1991 (aged 29)

Riders who joined the team for the 2021 season

Rider	2020 team
Samuele Battistella	NTT Pro Cycling
Gleb Brussenskiy	neo-pro (Vino–Astana Motors)
Stefan de Bod	NTT Pro Cycling
Yevgeniy Fedorov	neo-pro (Vino–Astana Motors)
Ben Perry	Israel Cycling Academy
Andrea Piccolo	neo-pro (Team Colpack–Ballan)
Javier Romo	neo-pro (triathlete)
Matteo Sobrero	NTT Pro Cycling

Riders who left the team during or after the 2020 season

Rider	2021 team
Zhandos Bizhigitov	Retired
Hernando Bohórquez	
Laurens De Vreese	Alpecin–Fenix
Daniil Fominykh	
Miguel Ángel López	Movistar Team

== Season victories ==
Date	Race	Competition	Rider	Country	Location	Ref.
14 March	Paris–Nice, Young rider classification	UCI World Tour	Aleksandr Vlasov (RUS)	France		
14 March	Paris–Nice, Team classification	UCI World Tour	(Note: The riders in the squad were Samuele Battistella, Omar Fraile, Ion Izagirre, Alexey Lutsenko, Luis León Sánchez, Matteo Sobrero, and Aleksandr Vlasov.)	France		
16 March	Tirreno–Adriatico, Team classification	UCI World Tour	(Note: The riders in the squad were Alex Aranburu, Manuele Boaro, Fabio Felline, Jakob Fuglsang, Hugo Houle, Gorka Izagirre, and Davide Martinelli.)	Italy		
6 April	Tour of the Basque Country, Stage 2	UCI World Tour	Alex Aranburu (ESP)	Spain	Sestao	
8 April	Tour of the Basque Country, Stage 4	UCI World Tour	Ion Izagirre (ESP)	Spain	Hondarribia	
16 May	Tour de Hongrie, Team classification	UCI Europe Tour	(Note: The riders in the squad were Manuele Boaro, Stefan de Bod, Yevgeniy Fedorov, Davide Martinelli, Javier Romo, and Artyom Zakharov.)	Hungary		
2 June	Critérium du Dauphiné, Stage 4 (ITT)	UCI World Tour	Alexey Lutsenko (KAZ)	France	Roche-la-Molière	
13 June	Route d'Occitanie, Team classification	UCI Europe Tour	(Note: The riders in the squad were Gleb Brussenskiy, Yevgeniy Fedorov, Dmitriy Gruzdev, Merhawi Kudus, Yuriy Natarov, Óscar Rodríguez, and Luis León Sánchez.)	France		
25 July	Prueba Villafranca - Ordiziako Klasika	UCI Europe Tour	Luis León Sánchez (ESP)	Spain	Ordizia	
8 August	Arctic Race of Norway, Team classification	UCI Europe Tour; UCI ProSeries	(Note: The riders in the squad were Samuele Battistella, Gleb Brussenskiy, Stefan de Bod, Fabio Felline, Yevgeniy Gidich, and Ben Perry.)	Norway		
11 October	Coppa Agostoni	UCI Europe Tour	Alexey Lutsenko (KAZ)	Italy	Lissone	
17 October	Veneto Classic	UCI Europe Tour	Samuele Battistella (ITA)	Italy	Bassano Del Grappa	

== National, Continental, and World Champions ==
Date	Discipline	Jersey	Rider	Country	Location	Ref.
17 June	Russian National Time Trial Championships		Aleksandr Vlasov (RUS)	Russia	Penza	
18 June	Italian National Time Trial Championships		Matteo Sobrero (ITA)	Italy	Faenza	
18 June	Spanish National Time Trial Championships		Ion Izagirre (ESP)	Spain	Busot	
19 June	Kazakhstan National Road Race Championships		Yevgeniy Fedorov (KAZ)	Kazakhstan	Petropavl	
20 June	Spanish National Road Race Championships		Omar Fraile (ESP)	Spain	La Nucia	
25 June	Eritrean National Time Trial Championships		Merhawi Kudus (ERI)	Eritrea	Asmara	
10 September	Canadian National Time Trial Championships		Hugo Houle (CAN)	Canada	Saint-Prosper	
