= Safia Al-Sayegh =

Emirati racing cyclist

Safia Al Sayegh
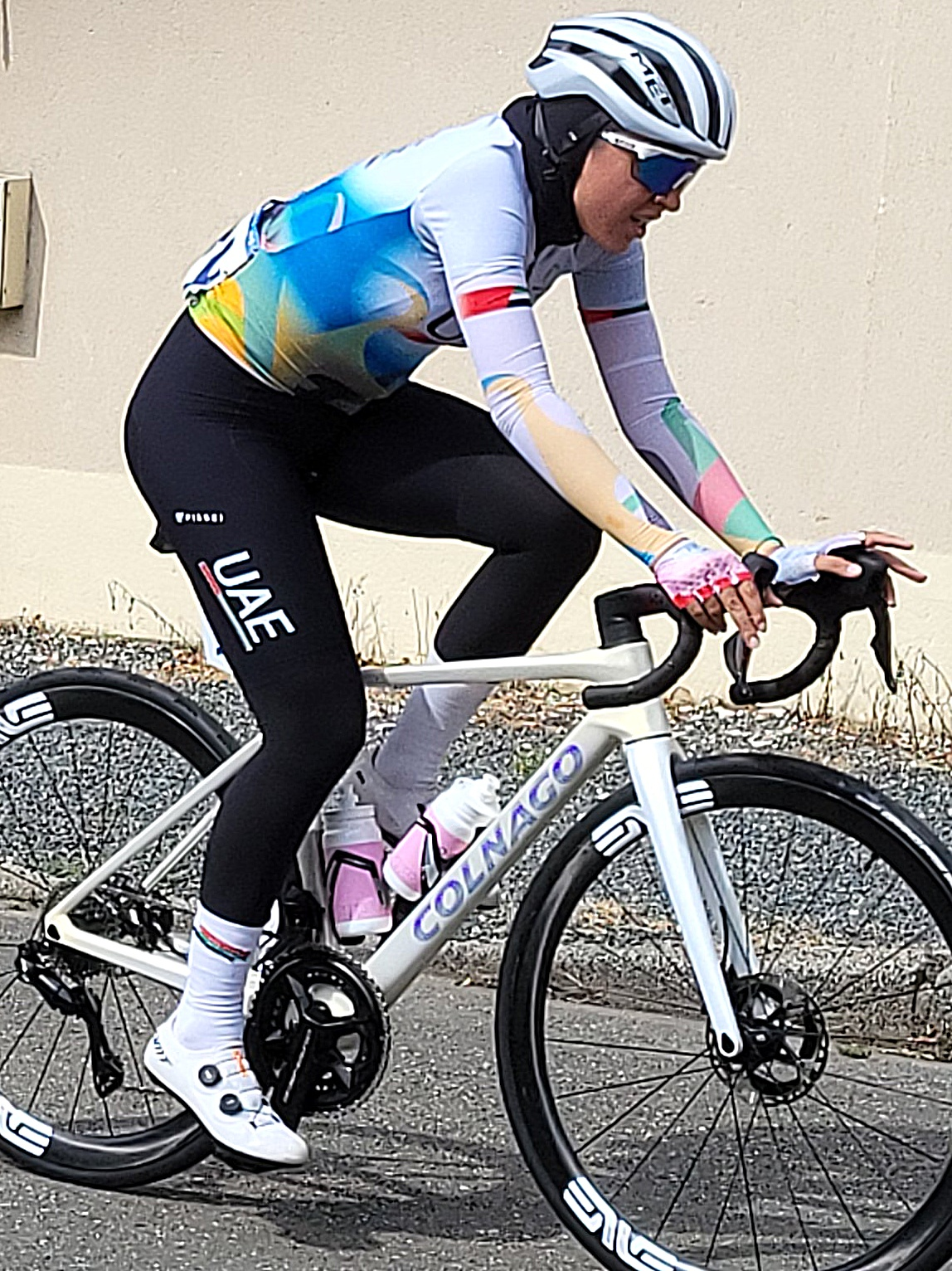
- 2024 Summer Olympics

Personal information
- Born: 23 September 2001 (age 25) Dubai, United Arab Emirates

Cycling career
- Sport: Cycling
- Current team: UAE Team ADQ
- Discipline: Road
- Role: Rider

Professional team
- 2022–: UAE Team ADQ
Medal record
Women's road bicycle racing
Representing United Arab Emirates
Silver medal – second place	2025 Phitsanulok	Time trial

Safia Al Sayegh (born 23 September 2001) is an Emirati professional racing cyclist, who currently rides for UCI Women's WorldTeam UAE Team ADQ.

== Major results ==
2019
National Road Championships

1st Road race
1st Time rrial

4th Road race, Asian Junior Road Championships
2022
National Road Championships

1st Road race
1st Time trial

3rd Time trial, Asian Road Championships
2nd Road race, Arab Road Championships
2023
National Road Championships

1st Road race
1st Under-23 time trial

5th Time trial, Asian Under-23 Road Championships
2024
National Road Championships

1st Road race
1st Time trial

8th Time trial, Asian Road Championships
2025
2nd Time trial, Asian Road Championships
