= Cycling at the 2022 Asian Games – Men's road race =

Men's road race at the 2022 Asian Games
- Venue: Chun'an Jieshou Sports Centre
- Date: 5 October 2023
- Competitors: 60 from 19 nations

Medalists
gold medal	Yevgeniy Fedorov	Kazakhstan
silver medal	Alexey Lutsenko	Kazakhstan
bronze medal	Sainbayaryn Jambaljamts	Mongolia

The men's 207.7 kilometres road race competition at the 2022 Asian Games took place on 5 October 2023 in Chun'an Jieshou Sports Centre.

== Schedule ==
All times are China Standard Time (UTC+08:00)

Date	Time	Event
Thursday, 5 October 2023	10:00	Final

== Results ==
Legend

- DNF — Did not finish
- OTL — Over time limit

Rank	Athlete	Time
1st place, gold medalist(s)	Yevgeniy Fedorov (KAZ)	4:25:29
2nd place, silver medalist(s)	Alexey Lutsenko (KAZ)	4:25:29
3rd place, bronze medalist(s)	Sainbayaryn Jambaljamts (MGL)	4:31:11
4	Ali Labib (IRI)	4:31:11
5	Dmitriy Gruzdev (KAZ)	4:31:11
6	Jang Kyung-gu (KOR)	4:31:11
7	Yukiya Arashiro (JPN)	4:31:11
8	Abdulla Jasim Al-Ali (UAE)	4:31:11
9	Muradjan Khalmuratov (UZB)	4:31:11
10	Sarawut Sirironnachai (THA)	4:31:11
11	Ariya Phounsavath (LAO)	4:31:11
12	Aiman Cahyadi (INA)	4:31:11
13	Thanakhan Chaiyasombat (THA)	4:31:15
14	Joo Dae-yeong (KOR)	4:31:26
15	Leung Ka Yu (HKG)	4:32:50
16	Ko Siu Wai (HKG)	4:32:50
17	Lü Xianjing (CHN)	4:32:50
18	Gleb Brussenskiy (KAZ)	4:32:50
19	Niu Yikui (CHN)	4:32:50
20	Ahmed Naser (BRN)	4:32:50
21	Terry Yudha Kusuma (INA)	4:32:50
22	Sergio Tu (TPE)	4:32:50
23	Dmitriy Bocharov (UZB)	4:32:50
24	Kim Eu-ro (KOR)	4:32:50
25	Yuma Koishi (JPN)	4:32:50
26	Navuti Liphongyu (THA)	4:32:50
27	Abdulla Al-Hammadi (UAE)	4:32:50
28	Jaber Al-Mansoori (UAE)	4:32:50
29	Leung Chun Wing (HKG)	4:32:59
30	Peerapol Chawchiangkwang (THA)	4:34:03
31	Lao Long San (MAC)	4:36:15
32	Wang Ruidong (CHN)	4:36:15
33	Kok Mun Wa (MAC)	4:36:15
34	Sayed Ahmed Alawi (BRN)	4:36:15
35	Batsaikhany Tegshbayar (MGL)	4:36:15
36	Kam Chin Pok (MAC)	4:36:15
37	Quàng Văn Cường (VIE)	4:36:19
38	Saif Al-Kaabi (UAE)	4:36:23
39	Bernard Van Aert (INA)	4:36:23
40	Ma Binyan (CHN)	4:36:25
—	Park Sang-hong (KOR)	OTL
—	Muhammad Andy Royan (INA)	OTL
—	Joshua Pascual (PHI)	OTL
—	Erdenebatyn Bilgüünjargal (MGL)	OTL
—	Mansoor Jawad (BRN)	OTL
—	Ronald Oranza (PHI)	OTL
—	Batmönkhiin Maral-Erdene (MGL)	DNF
—	Bekhzodbek Rakhimbaev (UZB)	DNF
—	Akramjon Sunnatov (UZB)	DNF
—	Vincent Lau (HKG)	DNF
—	Sailomyen Phommachanh (LAO)	DNF
—	Jonel Carcueva (PHI)	DNF
—	Chang Chih-sheng (TPE)	DNF
—	Ahmed Madan (BRN)	DNF
—	Liu Qihua (MAC)	DNF
—	Abdulhadi Al-Ajmi (KUW)	DNF
—	Mansour Al-Subaiei (KUW)	DNF
—	Fadhel Al-Khater (QAT)	DNF
—	Nayef Al-Mesallam (QAT)	DNF
DQ	Bilal Al-Saadi (QAT)	~~DNF~~

- Bilal Al-Saadi of the Qatar originally failed to finish the competition and later got disqualified after he tested positive for Erythropoietin.
