= Ali Labib =

Iranian cyclist (born 2002)

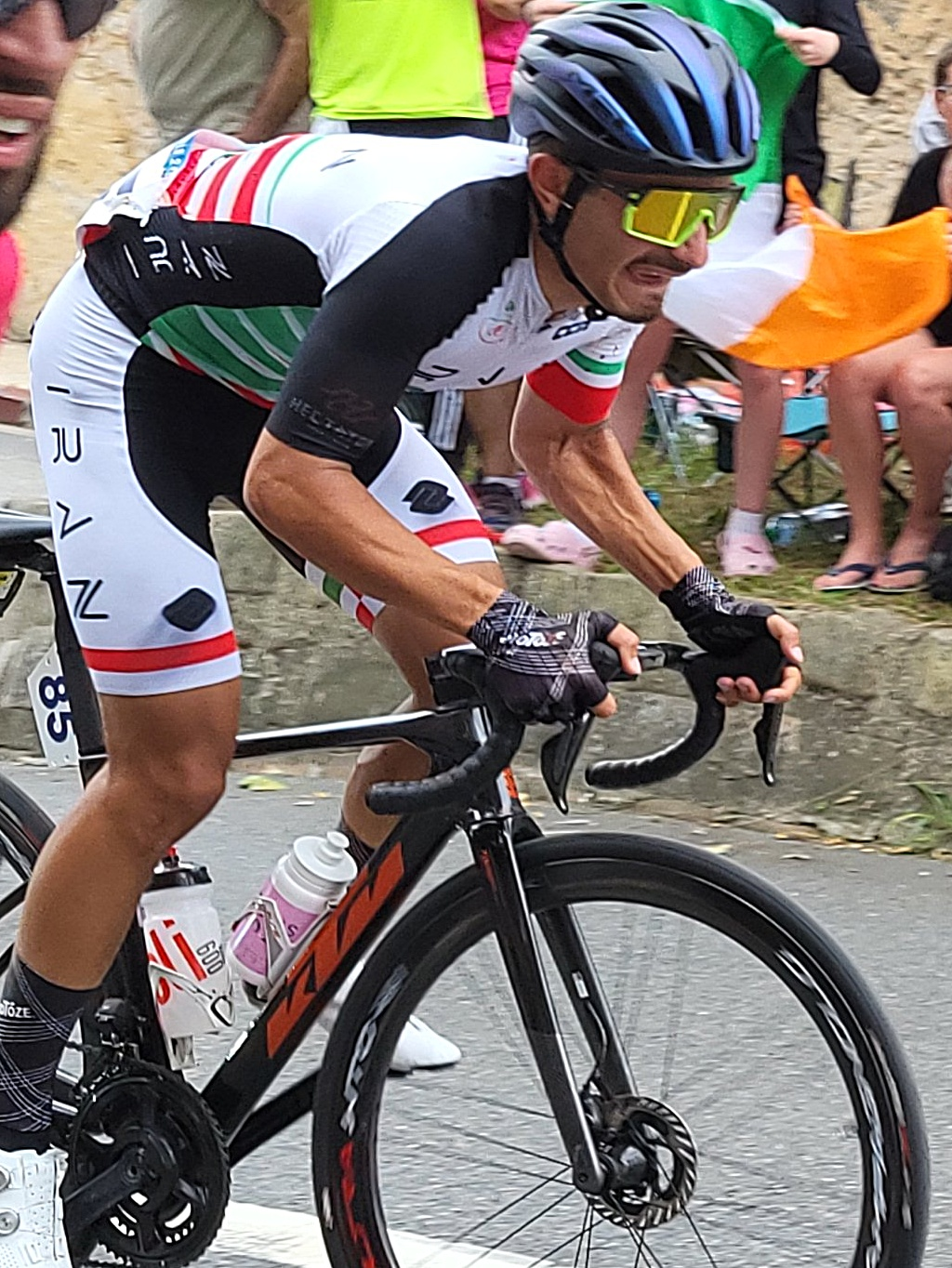
- Labib at the 2024 Summer Olympics

Personal information
- Full name: Ali Labib Shotorban
- Born: 21 September 2002 (age 24) Tabriz, Iran
- Height: 1.70 m (5 ft 7 in)
- Weight: 60 kg (132 lb)

Cycling career
- Sport: Cycling
- Current team: Shenzhen Gineyea–Xidesheng Cycling Team
- Discipline: Road
- Role: Rider

Professional teams
- 2022: Azad University Team
- 2023: Sidi Ali–Unlock Team
- 2023: Mes Sungun–Azad
- 2024–: Shenzhen Xidesheng Cycling Team

Ali Labib Shotorban (Persian: علی لبیب شتربان; born 21 September 2002) is an Iranian racing cyclist, who rides for UCI Continental team Shenzhen Gineyea–Xidesheng Cycling Team. He was the only representative of Iran in cycling at the 2024 Summer Olympics, and came in 76th out of 77 competitors.

== Major results ==
2019
1st Cross-country, National Junior Mountain Bike Championships
National Junior Road Championships

2nd Time trial
3rd Road race

2022
1st Young rider classification, Tour of Iran (Azerbaijan)
6th Road race, Asian Under-23 Road Championships
2023
2nd Road race, National Road Championships
4th Road race, Asian Games
5th Overall 100th Anniversary Tour of The Republic
10th Road race, Asian Under-23 Road Championships
2024
3rd Road race, Asian Under-23 Road Championships
5th Road race, National Road Championships
5th GP Yıldızdağı
2025
2nd Road race, National Road Championships
4th Grand Prix Kahramanmaraş
10th Overall Tour of Iran (Azarbaijan)
