= Cycling at the 2022 Asian Games – Men's omnium =

Men's omnium at the 2022 Asian Games
- Venue: Chun'an Jieshou Sports Centre Velodrome
- Date: 28 September 2023
- Competitors: 14 from 14 nations

Medalists
gold medal	Kazushige Kuboki	Japan
silver medal	Leung Ka Yu	Hong Kong
bronze medal	Ahmed Al-Mansoori	United Arab Emirates

The men's omnium competition at the 2022 Asian Games was held on 28 September 2023 at the Chun'an Jieshou Sports Centre Velodrome.

== Schedule ==
All times are China Standard Time (UTC+08:00)

Date	Time	Event
Thursday, 28 September 2023	10:00	Scratch race
Thursday, 28 September 2023	11:32	Tempo race
Thursday, 28 September 2023	15:27	Elimination race
Thursday, 28 September 2023	17:03	Points race

== Results ==
Legend

- DNF — Did not finish
- DNS — Did not start

=== Scratch race ===
Rank	Athlete	Laps down	Points
1	Yang Yang (CHN)		40
2	Kazushige Kuboki (JPN)		38
3	Leung Ka Yu (HKG)		36
4	Jang Hun (KOR)		34
5	Artyom Zakharov (KAZ)		32
6	Bernard Van Aert (INA)		30
7	Abdul Azim Aliyas (MAS)		28
8	Ahmed Al-Mansoori (UAE)		26
9	Niraj Kumar (IND)		24
10	Ali Labib (IRI)		22
11	Aleksey Fomovskiy (UZB)		20
12	Chang Chih-sheng (TPE)		18
13	Thak Kaeonoi (THA)		16
14	Lao Long San (MAC)		14

=== Tempo race ===
Rank	Athlete	Sprints won	Laps		Total	Finish order	Points
Rank	Athlete	Sprints won	+	−	Total	Finish order	Points
1	Ahmed Al-Mansoori (UAE)	10, 13, 15, 17, 19, 21, 23, 24, 26, 29, 31, 33			12	2	40
2	Bernard Van Aert (INA)	3, 4, 6, 12, 14, 16, 18, 20, 22, 25			10	9	38
3	Kazushige Kuboki (JPN)	27, 28, 30, 32, 34, 35, 36			7	1	36
4	Chang Chih-sheng (TPE)	7, 8, 9			3	12	34
5	Abdul Azim Aliyas (MAS)	11			1	6	32
6	Ali Labib (IRI)	5			1	7	30
7	Leung Ka Yu (HKG)				0	3	28
8	Aleksey Fomovskiy (UZB)				0	4	26
9	Yang Yang (CHN)				0	5	24
10	Jang Hun (KOR)				0	8	22
11	Artyom Zakharov (KAZ)				0	10	20
12	Thak Kaeonoi (THA)	1, 2		20	–18	11	18
13	Lao Long San (MAC)			40	DNF		–24
—	Niraj Kumar (IND)				DNS		

=== Elimination race ===
Rank	Athlete	Points
1	Artyom Zakharov (KAZ)	40
2	Ahmed Al-Mansoori (UAE)	38
3	Leung Ka Yu (HKG)	36
4	Bernard Van Aert (INA)	34
5	Jang Hun (KOR)	32
6	Ali Labib (IRI)	30
7	Yang Yang (CHN)	28
8	Abdul Azim Aliyas (MAS)	26
9	Kazushige Kuboki (JPN)	24
10	Aleksey Fomovskiy (UZB)	22
11	Thak Kaeonoi (THA)	20
12	Chang Chih-sheng (TPE)	18
13	Lao Long San (MAC)	16

=== Points race ===
Rank	Athlete	Sprint										Laps		Total	Finish order
Rank	Athlete	1	2	3	4	5	6	7	8	9	10	+	−	Total	Finish order
1	Kazushige Kuboki (JPN)	5		5	3	5	5	5	5	5	2	40		80	4
2	Aleksey Fomovskiy (UZB)		2		5	3	3		2			40		55	6
3	Chang Chih-sheng (TPE)		5			1		1				40		47	5
4	Leung Ka Yu (HKG)	3		3			1	2	3	1	10	20		43	1
5	Ali Labib (IRI)									3		40		43	7
6	Abdul Azim Aliyas (MAS)		1							2	6	20		29	2
7	Ahmed Al-Mansoori (UAE)				1		2	3	1			20		27	10
8	Jang Hun (KOR)		3									20		23	8
9	Yang Yang (CHN)			2							4			6	3
10	Bernard Van Aert (INA)	1			2	2								5	11
11	Artyom Zakharov (KAZ)	2		1										3	12
12	Thak Kaeonoi (THA)													0	9
13	Lao Long San (MAC)											20	20	0	13

=== Summary ===
Rank	Athlete	Scratch race	Tempo race	Elim. race	Points race	Total
1st place, gold medalist(s)	Kazushige Kuboki (JPN)	38	36	24	80	178
2nd place, silver medalist(s)	Leung Ka Yu (HKG)	36	28	36	43	143
3rd place, bronze medalist(s)	Ahmed Al-Mansoori (UAE)	26	40	38	27	131
4	Ali Labib (IRI)	22	30	30	43	125
5	Chang Chih-sheng (TPE)	18	34	18	47	117
6	Abdul Azim Aliyas (MAS)	28	32	26	29	115
7	Jang Hun (KOR)	34	22	32	23	111
8	Bernard Van Aert (INA)	30	38	34	5	107
9	Yang Yang (CHN)	40	24	28	6	98
10	Artyom Zakharov (KAZ)	32	20	40	3	95
11	Thak Kaeonoi (THA)	16	18	20	0	54
12	Lao Long San (MAC)	14	−24	16	0	6
—	Niraj Kumar (IND)	24	DNS			DNF
DQ	Aleksey Fomovskiy (UZB)	20	26	22	55	~~123~~

- Aleksey Fomovskiy of Uzbekistan originally finished 5th, but was later disqualified after he tested positive for Anabolic steroids.
