= Sun Jiajun =

Sun Jiajun may refer to:

- Alien Sun (born 1974), Hong Kong-based Singaporean actress
- Sun Jiajun (cyclist) (born 1996), Chinese cyclist
- Sun Jiajun (swimmer) (born 2000), Chinese swimmer
