= Sainbayaryn Jambaljamts =

Mongolian cyclist (born 1996)

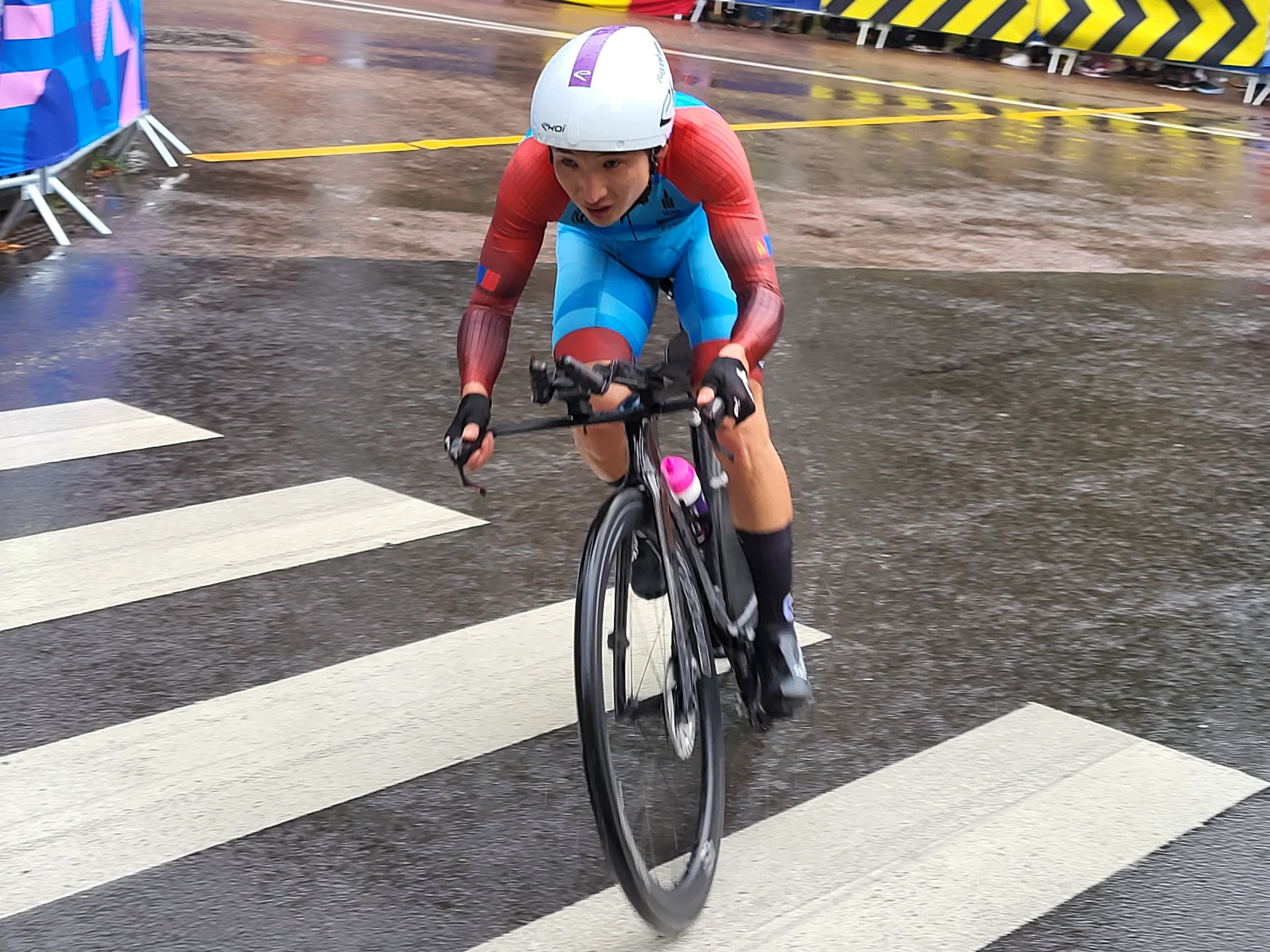
- Jambaljamts competing in the time trial at the 2024 Summer Olympics

Personal information
- Born: 4 September 1996 (age 30) Ulaanbaatar, Mongolia
- Height: 1.72 m (5 ft 8 in)
- Weight: 60 kg (132 lb)

Cycling career
- Sport: Cycling
- Current team: Burgos Burpellet BH
- Discipline: Road
- Role: Rider

Professional teams
- 2018: RTS Racing Team
- 2019–2020: Ferei Pro Cycling
- 2021–2023: Terengganu Cycling Team
- 2024–: Burgos BH

Major wins
- One-day races and Classics National Road Race Championships (2023) National Time Trial Championships (2022)
Medal record
Men's road bicycle racing
Representing Mongolia
Asian Games
Bronze medal – third place	2026 Aichi-Nagoya	Time trial
Bronze medal – third place	2022 Hangzhou	Road race
Asian Championships
Silver medal – second place	2022 Dushanbe	Team time trial
Silver medal – second place	2023 Rayong	Time trial
Bronze medal – third place	2022 Dushanbe	Road race
Bronze medal – third place	2025 Phitsanulok	Road race
U23 Asian Championships
Bronze medal – third place	2018 Naypyidaw	Under-23 road race

Sainbayaryn Jambaljamts (Mongolian: Сайнбаярын Жамбалжамц; born 4 September 1996) is a Mongolian cyclist, who currently rides for UCI ProTeam Burgos Burpellet BH. He is the current road race champion of Mongolia and a medalist at the Asian Games. He is the first rider from Mongolia to become a professional cyclist.

== Career ==
Sainbayaryn achieved his first professional win at the Tour of Fuzhou, where he won the Queen stage.

At the Asian Road Championships Sainbayaryn won a silver medal in the Team time trial and a bronze medal in the individual road race. Mongolia had not won medals in cycling at the Asian Games since 1990. He wore the white jersey as the best placed Asian rider for the first two stages of the Tour de Langkawi. He would finish the race ninth overall and win the white jersey after briefly losing it.

On the Queen stage of the 2023 Tour of Thailand Sainbayaryn finished in the yellow jersey group moving him up to third overall. In late 2023 Sainbayaryn signed a one-year contract with UCI ProTeam Burgos BH for the 2024 season.

Because he signed with Burgos BH for 2024 he became the first professional cyclist from Mongolia.

== Major results ==
2016
2nd Road race, National Under-23 Road Championships
4th Road race, National Road Championships
2018
1st Road race, National Under-23 Road Championships
3rd Road race, Asian Under-23 Road Championships
2019
1st Points classification, Tour of Xingtai
National Road Championships

2nd Road race
2nd Time trial

7th Overall Tour of China II
8th Overall Tour of Fuzhou

1st Stage 6

2021
1st Overall Tour of Thailand
1st Kahramanmaraş Grand Prix Road Race
2nd Grand Prix Kayseri
2nd Grand Prix Erciyes
2nd Germenica Grand Prix Road Race
4th Grand Prix Develi
5th Time trial, National Road Championships
2022
National Road Championships

1st Time trial
3rd Road race

1st Grand Prix Develi
Asian Road Championships

2nd Team time trial
3rd Road race

2nd Overall Tour of Sakarya
3rd Grand Prix Gündoğmuş
4th Grand Prix Velo Alanya
4th Grand Prix Cappadocia
6th Overall Tour of Sharjah
9th Overall Tour de Langkawi
2023
1st Stage 3 Tour of Azerbaijan (Iran)
National championships

1st Road race
2nd Time trial

2nd Overall Tour of Huangshan

1st Stage 2

2nd Overall Tour of Thailand
Asian Road Championships

3rd Time trial
7th Road race

3rd Overall Chengdu Tianfu
3rd Overall Tour de Kumano
8th Time trial, Asian Games
8th Tour of Kandovan
9th Overall Tour de Kyushu
2024
5th Overall Tour of Sharjah
3rd Overall Tour of Bostonliq
Asian Championships

8th Time trial
8th Road race

National Road Championships

1st Time trial
4th Road race
