= Feng Chun-kai =

Taiwanese cyclist (born 1988)

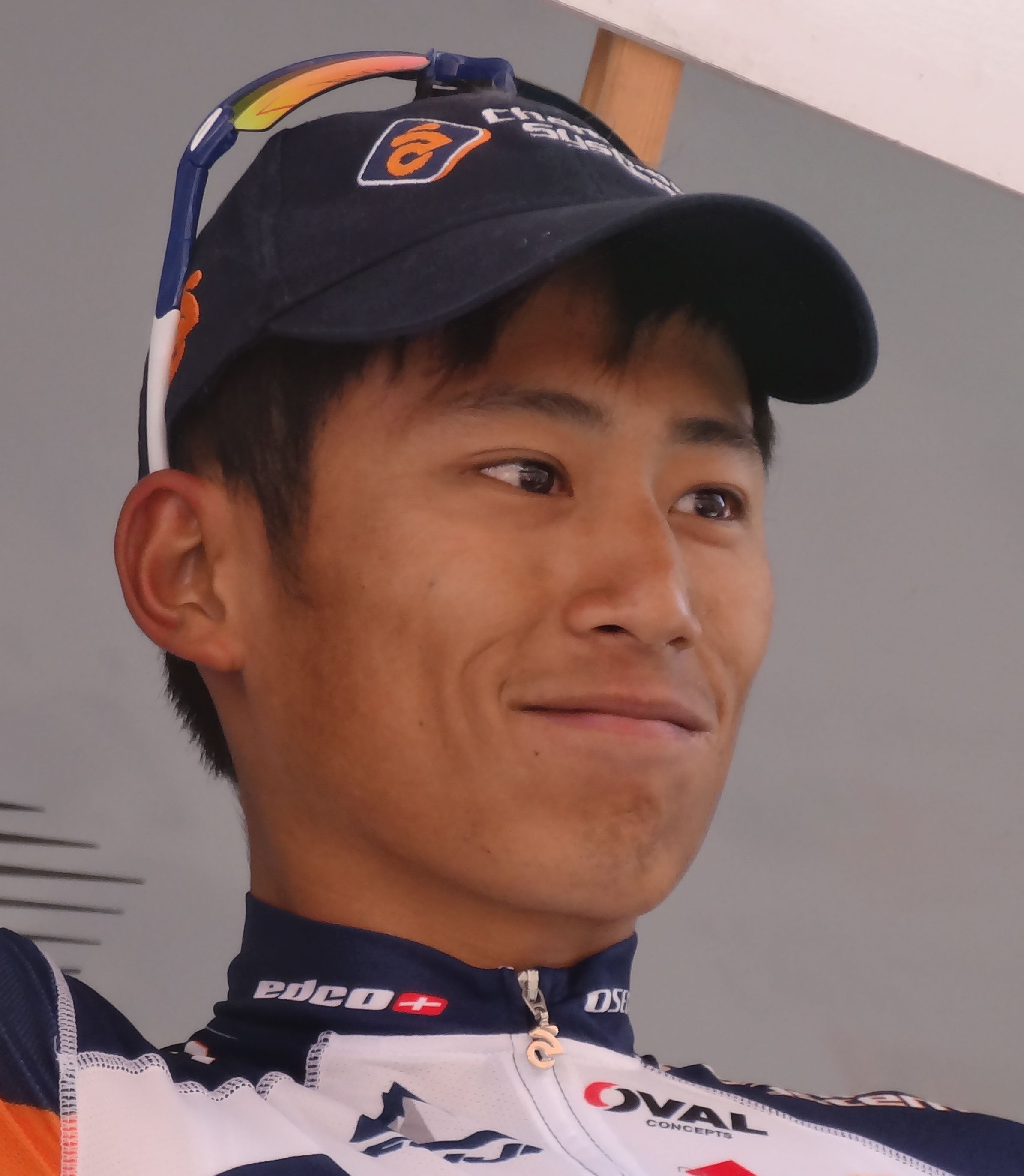
- Feng in 2013.

Personal information
- Full name: Feng Chun-kai
- Born: 2 November 1988 (age 37) Miaoli County, Republic of China (ROC)
- Height: 1.70 m (5 ft 7 in)
- Weight: 68 kg (150 lb)

Cycling career
- Sport: Cycling
- Current team: Astemo Utsunomiya Blitzen
- Disciplines: Road; Track
- Role: Rider
- Rider type: All-rounder

Professional teams
- 2010–2012: Action Cycling Team
- 2013: Champion System
- 2014: Team Gusto
- 2015–2016: Lampre–Merida
- 2017–2022: Bahrain–Merida
- 2023–: Utsunomiya Blitzen
Medal record
Representing Chinese Taipei
Men's road cycling
Asian Championships
Silver medal – second place	2019 Tashkent	Time trial
Bronze medal – third place	2019 Tashkent	Road race
Bronze medal – third place	2025 Phitsanulok	Time trial
East Asian Games
Gold medal – first place	2013 Tianjin	Road race
Men's track cycling
Asian Championships
Gold medal – first place	2007 Bangkok	Points race
Gold medal – first place	2012 Kuala Lumpur	Scratch
Silver medal – second place	2010 Sharjah	Pursuit
Bronze medal – third place	2009 Tenggarong	Pursuit
Bronze medal – third place	2014 Astana	Scratch

Feng Chun-kai (Chinese: 馮俊凱; pinyin: Féng Jùnjiā; born November 2, 1988) is a Taiwanese professional road and track cyclist. He represented his nation Taiwan, as a 19-year-old, at the 2008 Summer Olympics and later won numerous medals in track cycling, specifically in the men's points race and individual pursuit, at the Asian Championships. Feng has also claimed five Taiwanese national titles in road cycling, and a prestigious gold medal at the 2013 East Asian Games in Tianjin

== Racing career ==
Feng was born in Miaoli County. Considered one of Taiwan's most promising cyclists in his generation, Feng sought headlines on the international scene as he outsprinted Japanese duo Kazuhiro Mori and defending champion Makoto Iijima for the gold medal in men's point race at the 2007 Asian Cycling Championships in Bangkok, Thailand.

Signifying an official start of his cycling career, Feng qualified for the Chinese Taipei squad in the men's points race at the 2008 Summer Olympics in Beijing by receiving a wild card invitation from the Union Cycliste Internationale (UCI). Feng dropped out of a grueling 25-km sprint race in a field of twenty-three cyclists after he slowed down his own pace on the track with only one extra lap needed to complete and a deduction of twenty points.

Feng slowly emerged as a solid, all-around road and track rider, when he earned his first ever Taiwanese national road race title in 2009, and eventually mounted a fifth-place finish at the East Asian Games. By the following year, he joined with the Action Cycling Team as a professional and signed for three seasons in an exclusive contract.

In 2011, Feng established a historic milestone in pro cycling as the first ever Asian rider to score three consecutive stage triumphs and grab the yellow jersey and a prestigious tournament title at the International Cycling Classic in the Midwest region of the United States.

While still competing for the Action Cycling Team on his final season in the road race, Feng redrafted his efforts to chase for another medal again in the track cycling scene. At the 2012 Asian Cycling Championships in Kuala Lumpur, Malaysia, Feng ended his five-year drought by edging out Thailand's Turakit Boonratanathanakorn and home favorite Harrif Saleh on a sprint ride for the gold in the men's elite 10-kilometre (6.2-mile) scratch race.

In early 2013, Feng joined his fellow Olympic riders Zachary Bell of Canada and Wu Kin San of Hong Kong for the Champion System pro cycling team. Feng started his initial season by participating in the Tour de Taiwan, where he took top honors in the mountain classification to secure the jersey. Feng also reclaimed his fourth Taiwanese national road race title, and added the time trial title to his resume for the first time, since he won three straight championships from 2009 to 2011. In October 2013, Feng picked up his gold medal on the strength of an early lead in the men's road race at the East Asian Games in Tianjin, China.

In November 2014 Feng was announced as a signing for the Lampre–Merida team for the 2015 season, becoming the first Taiwanese rider to race on the UCI World Tour.

Feng placed third in the 2019 Asian Road Cycling Championships, and qualified for the 2020 Summer Olympics. He became the first Taiwanese cyclist to qualify for the Olympic men's road cycling event since Chen Chih-hao in 1996.

== Major results ==
2007
1st Points race, Asian Track Championships
2009
1st Road race, National Road Championships
1st Stage 2 Giant Cup
1st Stage 2 Tour of East Taiwan
3rd Individual pursuit, Asian Track Championships
5th Road race, East Asian Games
2010
1st Road race, National Road Championships
1st Overall Giant Cup
2nd Individual pursuit, Asian Track Championships
7th Time trial, Asian Road Championships
7th Overall Tour de Taiwan
8th Overall Tour de East Java
9th Individual pursuit, Asian Games
9th Overall Tour de Hokkaido
10th Overall Tour de Singkarak
2011
1st Road race, National Road Championships
1st Overall International Cycling Classic

1st Stages 1, 5 & 13

3rd Taiwan Cup
9th Overall Tour de Singkarak
2012
1st Mountains classification Tour de Filipinas
1st Mountains classification Tour of Fuzhou
1st Stage 3 Giant Cup
2nd Scratch, Asian Track Championships
3rd Overall Tour de Singkarak
7th Overall Tour de Taiwan

1st Mountains classification

10th Road race, Asian Road Championships
2013
1st Road race, East Asian Games
National Road Championships

1st Road race
1st Time trial

1st Mountains classification Tour de Taiwan
1st Stage 1 Tour of East Taiwan
7th Time trial, Asian Road Championships
2014
National Road Championships

1st Road race
1st Time trial

1st Mountains classification Tour de Taiwan
6th Overall Tour of Thailand

1st Stage 3

8th Time trial, Asian Road Championships
8th Overall Tour de East Java
10th Road race, Asian Games
2015
National Road Championships

1st Road race
1st Time trial

9th Time trial, Asian Road Championships
2016
Asian Road Championships

5th Road race
8th Time trial

2018
3rd Tour de Okinawa
5th Time trial, Asian Games
Asian Road Championships

9th Road race
9th Time trial

2019
1st Time trial, National Road Championships
Asian Road Championships

2nd Time trial
3rd Road race

8th Tour de Okinawa
9th Overall Tour de Taiwan
2020
4th Overall Tour de Taiwan

1st Asian rider classification

2021
1st Road race, National Road Championships
2022
6th Overall Tour de Taiwan

1st Asian rider classification
