= 2005 Giro d'Italia, Prologue to Stage 10 =

Italian bicycle race

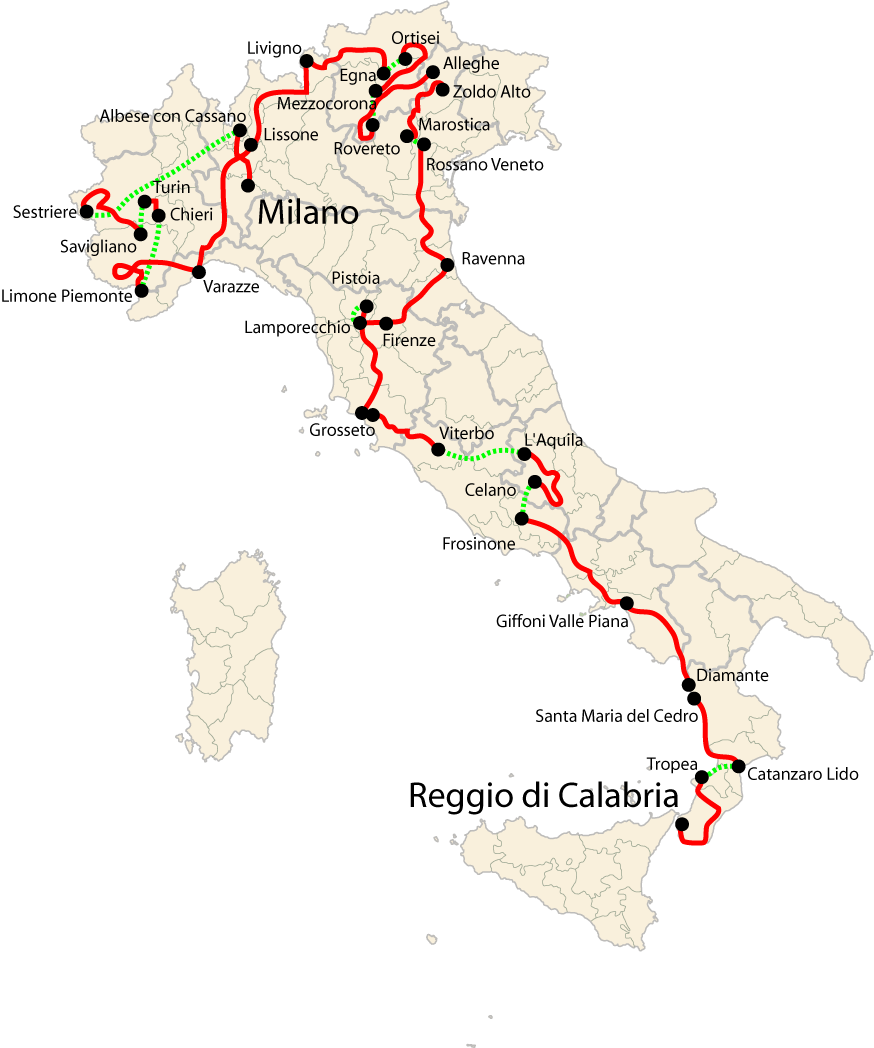
Route of the 2005 Giro d'Italia

The 2005 Giro d'Italia was the 88th edition of the cycle race, one of cycling's Grand Tours. The Giro began in Reggio Calabria with a prologue individual time trial on 7 May, and Stage 10 occurred on 18 May with a flat stage to Rossano Veneto. The race finished in Milan on 29 May.

== Prologue ==
7 May 2005 — Reggio Calabria, 1.15 km (0.71 mi) (ITT)

The prologue was a 1.15 km (0.71 mi) individual time trial. It was won by the Australian Brett Lancaster with a 0.289 second advantage over Matteo Tosatto, who scored second. After the last rider, Mario Cipollini received the homage of the Italian cycling world, doing the 1.15 kilometer race out of competition. He had announced his retirement just ten days before.

Prologue result

Rank	Rider	Team	Time
1	Brett Lancaster (AUS)	Ceramica Panaria–Navigare	1' 20"
2	Matteo Tosatto (ITA)	Fassa Bortolo	+ 1"
3	Alessandro Petacchi (ITA)	Fassa Bortolo	+ 1"
4	Paolo Savoldelli (ITA)	Discovery Channel	+ 1"
5	Olaf Pollack (GER)	T-Mobile Team	+ 2"

General Classification after Prologue

Rank	Rider	Team	Time
1	Brett Lancaster (AUS)	Ceramica Panaria–Navigare	1' 20"
2	Matteo Tosatto (ITA)	Fassa Bortolo	+ 1"
3	Alessandro Petacchi (ITA)	Fassa Bortolo	s.t.
4	Paolo Savoldelli (ITA)	Discovery Channel	s.t.
5	Olaf Pollack (GER)	T-Mobile Team	+ 2"

== Stage 1 ==
8 May 2005 — Reggio Calabria to Tropea, 208 km (129 mi)

At the beginning of the first stage, a four-man breakaway formed and led by almost ten minutes at one point. Thorwald Veneberg was finally captured again about 20 kilometers before the end. However, his efforts paid by giving him the first maglia verde of the Giro. On the last kilometer Paolo Bettini managed to get away on a very steep gradient.

Stage 1 result

Rank	Rider	Team	Time
1	Paolo Bettini (ITA)	Quick-Step–Innergetic	5h 09' 32"
2	Robbie McEwen (AUS)	Davitamon–Lotto	+ 3"
3	Alessandro Petacchi (ITA)	Fassa Bortolo	+ 4"
4	Baden Cooke (AUS)	Française des Jeux	s.t.
5	Manuele Mori (ITA)	Saunier Duval–Prodir	s.t.

General classification after stage 1

Rank	Rider	Team	Time
1	Paolo Bettini (ITA)	Quick-Step–Innergetic	5h 10' 35"
2	Robbie McEwen (AUS)	Davitamon–Lotto	+ 12"
3	Alessandro Petacchi (ITA)	Fassa Bortolo	+ 14"
4	Paolo Savoldelli (ITA)	Discovery Channel	+ 22"
5	Marco Velo (ITA)	Fassa Bortolo	+ 25"

== Stage 2 ==
9 May 2005 — Catanzaro Lido to Santa Maria del Cedro, 177 km (110 mi)

Having been defeated by Paolo Bettini and Robbie McEwen on the previous stage, Italian favorite Alessandro Petacchi failed yet again in the bunch sprint in Santa Maria Del Cedro. This time, he claimed, he had been forced to change his direction because of Estonian Jaan Kirsipuu.

Stage 2 result

Rank	Rider	Team	Time
1	Robbie McEwen (AUS)	Davitamon–Lotto	4h 34' 47"
2	Isaac Gálvez (ESP)	Illes Balears–Caisse d'Epargne	+ 0"
3	Robert Förster (GER)	Gerolsteiner	+ 0"
4	Alessandro Petacchi (ITA)	Fassa Bortolo	+ 0"
5	Baden Cooke (AUS)	Française des Jeux	+ 0"

General classification after stage 2

Rank	Rider	Team	Time
1	Robbie McEwen (AUS)	Davitamon–Lotto	9h 45' 14"
2	Paolo Bettini (ITA)	Quick-Step–Innergetic	+ 8"
3	Alessandro Petacchi (ITA)	Fassa Bortolo	+ 22"
4	Isaac Gálvez (ESP)	Quick-Step–Innergetic	+ 27"
5	Paolo Savoldelli (ITA)	Discovery Channel	+ 30"

== Stage 3 ==
10 May 2005 — Diamante to Giffoni Valle Piana, 210 km (130 mi)

Just as in the first stage, the sprinter's teams were not able to stop a breakaway in the last kilometers of the race. This time, it was a group of fifty riders which included all the GC important riders. Danilo Di Luca, in a great form in season 2005, beat fellow Italian Damiano Cunego in the sprint for the stage victory.

Stage 3 result

Rank	Rider	Team	Time
1	Danilo Di Luca (ITA)	Liquigas–Bianchi	5h 24' 17"
2	Damiano Cunego (ITA)	Lampre–Caffita	+ 0"
3	Stefano Garzelli (ITA)	Liquigas–Bianchi	+ 0"
4	Mirko Celestino (ITA)	Domina Vacanze	+ 0"
5	Francisco Ventoso (ESP)	Saunier Duval–Prodir	+ 0"

General classification after stage 3

Rank	Rider	Team	Time
1	Paolo Bettini (ITA)	Quick-Step–Innergetic	15h 09' 35"
2	Danilo Di Luca (ITA)	Liquigas–Bianchi	+ 9"
3	Damiano Cunego (ITA)	Lampre–Caffita	+ 17"
4	Stefano Garzelli (ITA)	Liquigas–Bianchi	+ 23"
5	Paolo Savoldelli (ITA)	Discovery Channel	+ 26"

== Stage 4 ==
11 May 2005 — Giffoni Valle Piana to Frosinone, 197 km (122 mi)

Paolo Bettini won the sprint at the end which was fought between five cyclists. But in this process he caused Baden Cooke to fall and was declassified because of this. Luca Mazzanti, who came in second, inherited the victory. After the stage, Bettini threatened to abandon the race, but it turned out to be an empty threat.

Stage 4 result

Rank	Rider	Team	Time
1	Luca Mazzanti (ITA)	Ceramica Panaria–Navigare	5h 10' 09"
2	Dario Cioni (ITA)	Liquigas–Bianchi	+ 0"
3	Michele Scarponi (ITA)	Liberty Seguros–Würth	+ 0"
4	Paolo Bettini (ITA)	Quick-Step–Innergetic	+ 0"
5	Mirko Celestino (ITA)	Domina Vacanze	+ 0"

General classification after stage 4

Rank	Rider	Team	Time
1	Paolo Bettini (ITA)	Quick-Step–Innergetic	20h 19' 44"
2	Danilo Di Luca (ITA)	Liquigas–Bianchi	+ 13"
3	Luca Mazzanti (ITA)	Ceramica Panaria–Navigare	+ 16"
4	Dario Cioni (ITA)	Liquigas–Bianchi	+ 19"
5	Damiano Cunego (ITA)	Lampre–Caffita	+ 21"

== Stage 5 ==
12 May 2005 — Celano to L'Aquila, 215 km (134 mi)

Danilo Di Luca got his second stage victory in 2005 Giro d'Italia, notching this win ahead of Fassa Bortolo's Marzio Bruseghin. Otherwise, this stage had no important influence on the fight for the general classification.

Stage 5 result

Rank	Rider	Team	Time
1	Danilo Di Luca (ITA)	Liquigas–Bianchi	6h 01' 18"
2	Marzio Bruseghin (ITA)	Fassa Bortolo	+ 0"
3	Mauricio Ardila (COL)	Davitamon–Lotto	+ 2"
4	Bjoern Leukemans (BEL)	Davitamon–Lotto	+ 2"
5	Ivan Basso (ITA)	Team CSC	+ 2"

General classification after stage 5

Rank	Rider	Team	Time
1	Danilo Di Luca (ITA)	Liquigas–Bianchi	26h 20' 55"
2	Paolo Bettini (ITA)	Quick-Step–Innergetic	+ 3"
3	Luca Mazzanti (ITA)	Ceramica Panaria–Navigare	+ 25"
4	Dario Cioni (ITA)	Liquigas–Bianchi	+ 28"
5	Damiano Cunego (ITA)	Lampre–Caffita	+ 30"

== Stage 6 ==
13 May 2005 — Viterbo to Marina di Grosseto, 154 km (96 mi)

Just as Danilo Di Luca had done the previous day, Australian Robbie McEwen took his second win in this year's Giro. This time, he did not have to beat Alessandro Petacchi, since the Italian's Torino biancoblù de-railed, causing the fall of some of the Fassa Bortolo riders, and forcing "Ale-Jet" to halt to a stop. McEwen's teammate Henk Vogels attacked in the last kilometer, but was surpassed just at the finish line by four other cyclists.

Stage 6 result

Rank	Rider	Team	Time
1	Robbie McEwen (AUS)	Davitamon–Lotto	3h 37' 17"
2	Jaan Kirsipuu (EST)	Crédit Agricole	+ 0"
3	Volodymyr Bileka (UKR)	Discovery Channel	+ 0"
4	Isaac Gálvez (ESP)	Illes Balears–Caisse d'Epargne	+ 0"
5	Henk Vogels (AUS)	Davitamon–Lotto	+ 0"

General classification after stage 6

Rank	Rider	Team	Time
1	Paolo Bettini (ITA)	Quick-Step–Innergetic	29h 58' 09"
2	Danilo Di Luca (ITA)	Liquigas–Bianchi	+ 3"
3	Luca Mazzanti (ITA)	Ceramica Panaria–Navigare	+ 28"
4	Dario Cioni (ITA)	Liquigas–Bianchi	+ 31"
5	Damiano Cunego (ITA)	Lampre–Caffita	+ 33"

== Stage 7 ==
14 May 2005 — Grosseto to Pistoia, 205 km (127 mi)

After a long breakaway, lasting throughout most of the stage, Spaniard Koldo Gil was the first to arrive at the finish line in Pistoia. Damiano Cunego, who was second, leading a pursuing group, celebrated thinking he had won the stage, not knowing that Gil had already taken the victory. Ivan Basso, who had been forced to change his bicycle because of a puncture in the last climb of the day, lost thirty seconds to his rivals for GC.

Stage 7 result

Rank	Rider	Team	Time
1	Koldo Gil (ESP)	Liberty Seguros–Würth	5h 08' 17"
2	Damiano Cunego (ITA)	Lampre–Caffita	+ 20"
3	Danilo Di Luca (ITA)	Liquigas–Bianchi	+ 20"
4	Mirko Celestino (ITA)	Domina Vacanze	+ 20"
5	Patrice Halgand (FRA)	Crédit Agricole	+ 20"

General classification after stage 7

Rank	Rider	Team	Time
1	Danilo Di Luca (ITA)	Liquigas–Bianchi	35h 06' 41"
2	Damiano Cunego (ITA)	Lampre–Caffita	+ 26"
3	Mirko Celestino (ITA)	Domina Vacanze	+ 54"
4	Gilberto Simoni (ITA)	Lampre–Caffita	+ 54"
5	Dario Cioni (ITA)	Liquigas–Bianchi	+ 1' 06"

== Stage 8 ==
15 May 2005 — Lamporecchio to Florence, 45 km (28 mi) (ITT)

The eighth stage was a time trial. Danilo Di Luca came in tenth and was able to keep the maglia rosa. Otherwise, this stage meant the victory for American David Zabriskie, and the revival of his teammate Ivan Basso, second in the time trial, and who made up for all the time he had lost the day before and even more. On the other hand, this was a very bad day for both Lampre riders Damiano Cunego and Gilberto Simoni.

Stage 8 result

Rank	Rider	Team	Time
1	David Zabriskie (USA)	Team CSC	58' 31"
2	Ivan Basso (ITA)	Team CSC	+ 17"
3	Paolo Savoldelli (ITA)	Discovery Channel	+ 44"
4	Marzio Bruseghin (ITA)	Fassa Bortolo	+ 48"
5	Serhiy Honchar (UKR)	Domina Vacanze	+ 51"

General classification after stage 8

Rank	Rider	Team	Time
1	Danilo Di Luca (ITA)	Liquigas–Bianchi	36h 06' 47"
2	Ivan Basso (ITA)	Team CSC	+ 9"
3	Paolo Savoldelli (ITA)	Discovery Channel	+ 35"
4	Damiano Cunego (ITA)	Lampre–Caffita	+ 1' 15"
5	Dario Cioni (ITA)	Liquigas–Bianchi	+ 1' 27"

== Stage 9 ==
16 May 2005 — Florence to Ravenna, 139 km (86 mi)

Alessandro Petacchi got his first victory in the 2005 Giro. Paolo Bettini and Swiss Aurélien Clerc had a great performance at this stage, surpassing pure sprinters Robbie McEwen or Erik Zabel.

Stage 9 result

Rank	Rider	Team	Time
1	Alessandro Petacchi (ITA)	Fassa Bortolo	3h 15' 32"
2	Paolo Bettini (ITA)	Quick-Step–Innergetic	+ 0"
3	Aurélien Clerc (SUI)	Phonak	+ 0"
4	Robbie McEwen (AUS)	Davitamon–Lotto	+ 0"
5	Erik Zabel (GER)	T-Mobile Team	+ 0"

General classification after stage 9

Rank	Rider	Team	Time
1	Danilo Di Luca (ITA)	Liquigas–Bianchi	39h 22' 19"
2	Ivan Basso (ITA)	Team CSC	+ 9"
3	Paolo Savoldelli (ITA)	Discovery Channel	+ 35"
4	Damiano Cunego (ITA)	Lampre–Caffita	+ 1' 15"
5	Dario Cioni (ITA)	Liquigas–Bianchi	+ 1' 27"

== Stage 10 ==
18 May 2005 — Ravenna to Rossano Veneto, 212 km (132 mi)

On the stage after the race's first rest day, Robbie McEwen took vengeance on Alessandro Petacchi in a bunch sprint. The bunch spring had to be solved with the aid of the photo-finish, which determined that the Australian had beaten the Italian by a mere question of millimeters.

Stage 10 result

Rank	Rider	Team	Time
1	Robbie McEwen (AUS)	Davitamon–Lotto	5h 29' 21"
2	Alessandro Petacchi (ITA)	Fassa Bortolo	+ 0"
3	Stuart O'Grady (AUS)	Cofidis	+ 0"
4	Erik Zabel (GER)	T-Mobile Team	+ 0"
5	Paolo Bettini (ITA)	Quick-Step–Innergetic	+ 0"

General classification after stage 10

Rank	Rider	Team	Time
1	Danilo Di Luca (ITA)	Liquigas–Bianchi	44h 51' 40"
2	Ivan Basso (ITA)	Team CSC	+ 9"
3	Paolo Savoldelli (ITA)	Discovery Channel	+ 35"
4	Damiano Cunego (ITA)	Lampre–Caffita	+ 1' 15"
5	Dario Cioni (ITA)	Liquigas–Bianchi	+ 1' 27"
