= Grand Prix Develi =

Race details
- Date: September
- Region: Turkey
- Discipline: Road
- Competition: UCI Europe Tour
- Type: One-day race
- Web site: gpdeveli.veloerciyes.com

History
- First edition: 2020
- Editions: 3 (as of 2022)
- First winner: Anatoliy Budyak (UKR) (men); Laura Milena Toconas (COL) (women)
- Most wins: No repeat winners
- Most recent: Sainbayaryn Jambaljamts (MGL) (men); Tatiana Antoshina (RUS) (women)

The Grand Prix Develi is a one-day road cycling race held in Turkey. It is rated as a 1.2 event on the UCI Europe Tour.

== Winners ==
=== Men ===
| Year | Country | Rider | Team |
|---|---|---|---|
| 2020 | Ukraine | Anatoliy Budyak | Ukraine (national team) |
| 2021 | Ukraine | Mykhaylo Kononenko | Salcano–Sakarya BB Team |
| 2022 | Mongolia | Sainbayaryn Jambaljamts | Terengganu Polygon Cycling Team |

=== Women ===
| Year | Country | Rider | Team |
|---|---|---|---|
| 2020 | Colombia | Laura Milena Toconas | Colnago CM Team |
| 2021 | Russia | Tatiana Antoshina | |
