= 2023 Asian Road Cycling Championships =

- Venue: Rayong, Thailand
- Date(s): 7–13 June 2023

The 2023 Asian Road Cycling Championships took place in Rayong, Thailand from 7 to 13 June 2023.

The road race events were also used as a Continental Qualification Tournament for the 2024 Summer Olympics.

== Medal summary ==
=== Men ===
Event	Gold	Silver	Bronze
Individual road race	Gleb Brussenskiy; Kazakhstan	Yevgeniy Gidich; Kazakhstan	Yukiya Arashiro; Japan
Individual time trial	Yevgeniy Fedorov; Kazakhstan	Sergio Tu; Chinese Taipei	Sainbayaryn Jambaljamts; Mongolia

=== Women ===
Event	Gold	Silver	Bronze
Individual road race	Nguyễn Thị Thật; Vietnam	Sun Jiajun; China	Jutatip Maneephan; Thailand
Individual time trial	Olga Zabelinskaya; Uzbekistan	Na Ah-reum; South Korea	Rinata Sultanova; Kazakhstan

=== Mixed ===
Event	Gold	Silver	Bronze
Team relay	Kazakhstan; Yevgeniy Fedorov; Dmitriy Gruzdev; Igor Chzhan; Makhabbat Umutzhanova; Rinata Sultanova; Marina Kuzmina	Uzbekistan; Aleksey Fomovskiy; Dmitriy Bocharov; Bekhzodbek Rakhimbaev; Olga Zabelinskaya; Evgeniya Golotina; Yanina Kuskova	China; Niu Yikui; Bai Lijun; Liu Jiankun; Sun Jiajun; Wang Tingting; Cui Yuhang

== Medal table ==
Rank	Nation	Gold	Silver	Bronze	Total
1	Kazakhstan	3	1	1	5
2	Uzbekistan	1	1	0	2
3	Vietnam	1	0	0	1
4	China	0	1	1	2
5	Chinese Taipei	0	1	0	1
5	South Korea	0	1	0	1
7	Japan	0	0	1	1
7	Mongolia	0	0	1	1
7	Thailand	0	0	1	1
Totals (9 entries)		5	5	5	15
