= Chen Chien-liang (cyclist) =

Taiwanese cyclist

Personal information
- Full name: Chen Chien-liang
- Born: 7 November 1993 (age 32)

Cycling career
- Sport: Cycling
- Discipline: Road
- Role: Rider

Professional teams
- 2012: Action Cycling Team
- 2014: Team Gusto
- 2015–2017: Action Cycling Team
- 2019–: Memil Pro Cycling
Medal record
Representing Chinese Taipei
Men's track cycling
Asian Championships
Bronze medal – third place	2016 Izu	points race

Chen Chien-liang (born 7 November 1993) is a Taiwanese road and track cyclist, who last rode for UCI Continental team Meiyo CCN Pro Cycling. He won the bronze medal in the points race at the 2016 Asian Cycling Championships.

== Major results ==
2015
National Road Championships

3rd Road race
3rd Time trial

2017
National Road Championships

2nd Time trial
3rd Road race

10th Overall Tour de Taiwan
2019
2nd Road race, National Road Championships
2020
1st Road race, National Road Championships
