= Wu Po-hung =

Taiwanese cyclist (born 1985)

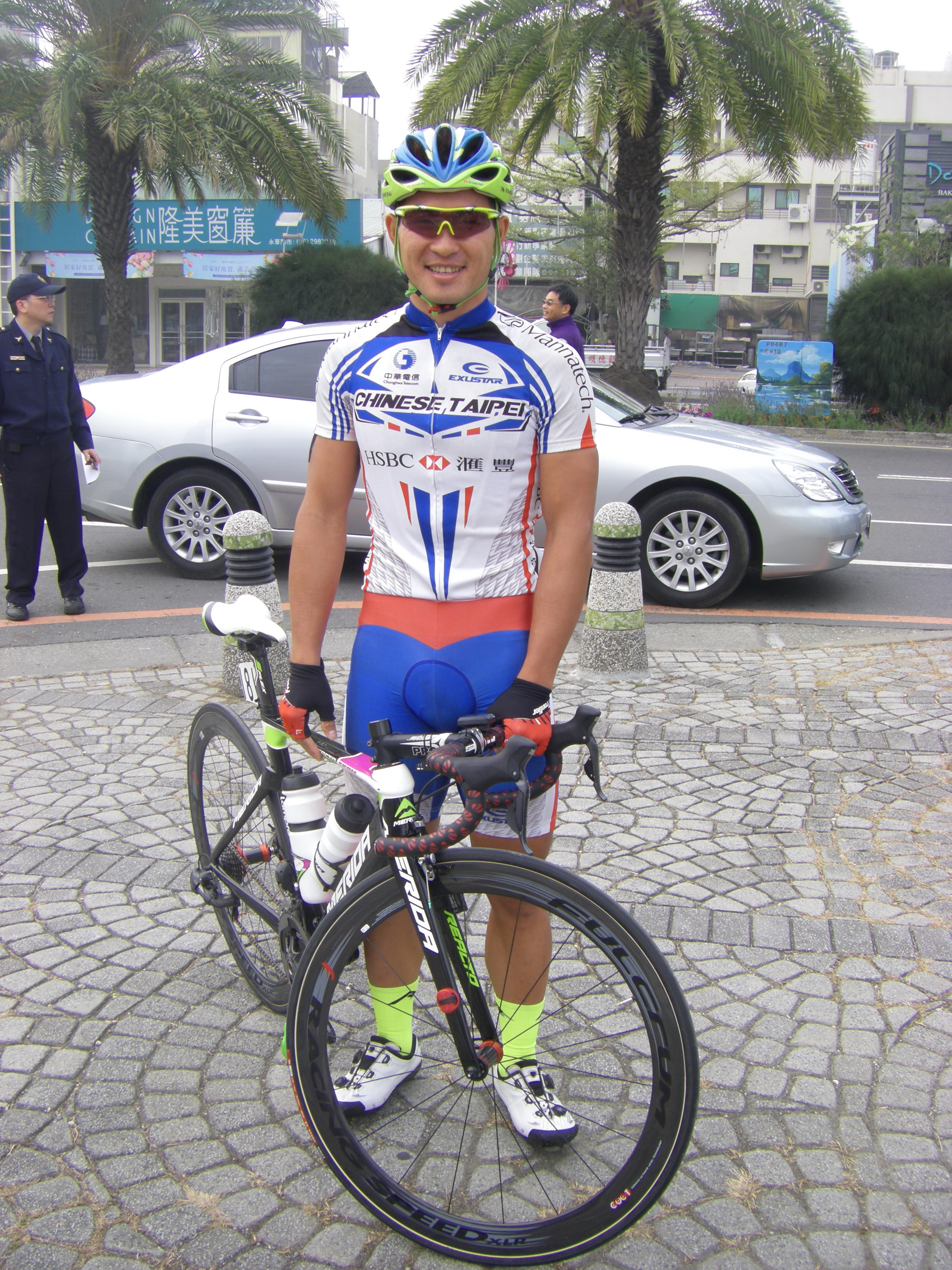

Personal information
- Full name: Wu Po-hung
- Born: 22 June 1985 (age 41)

Cycling career
- Sport: Cycling
- Current team: Retired
- Disciplines: Track; Road
- Role: Rider
- Rider type: Endurance (track)

Professional team
- 2012–2013: Team Senter–Merida

Wu Po Hung (born 22 June 1985) is a Taiwanese former road and track cyclist. He competed in the omnium event at the 2012 UCI Track Cycling World Championships.

He finished third in the time trial at the 2013 Taiwanese National Road Championships, and eighth in the road race at the 2014 Asian Games.
