= 2025 Asian Road Cycling Championships =

- Venue: Phitsanulok, Thailand
- Date(s): 7–16 February 2025

The 2025 Asian Road Cycling Championships took place in Phitsanulok, Thailand from 7 to 16 February 2025.

== Medal summary ==
=== Men ===
Event	Gold	Silver	Bronze
Individual road race	Lü Xianjing; China	Peerapol Chawchiangkwang; Thailand	Sainbayaryn Jambaljamts; Mongolia
Individual time trial	Yevgeniy Fedorov; Kazakhstan	Dmitriy Gruzdev; Kazakhstan	Feng Chun-kai; Chinese Taipei

=== Women ===
Event	Gold	Silver	Bronze
Individual road race	Jutatip Maneephan; Thailand	Nguyễn Thị Thật; Vietnam	Lee Sze Wing; Hong Kong
Individual time trial	Yanina Kuskova; Uzbekistan	Safia Al-Sayegh; United Arab Emirates	Tsuyaka Uchino; Japan

=== Mixed ===
Event	Gold	Silver	Bronze
Team relay	Kazakhstan; Yevgeniy Fedorov; Dmitriy Gruzdev; Anton Kuzmin; Anzhela Solovyeva; Rinata Sultanova; Makhabbat Umutzhanova	Japan; Yukiya Arashiro; Yuma Koishi; Koki Kamada; Tsuyaka Uchino; Mizuki Ikeda; Maho Kakita	Hong Kong; Vincent Lau; Mow Ching Yin; Ng Pak Hang; Lee Sze Wing; Leung Wing Yee; Yang Qianyu

== Medal table ==
Rank	Nation	Gold	Silver	Bronze	Total
1	Kazakhstan	2	1	0	3
2	Thailand	1	1	0	2
3	China	1	0	0	1
3	Uzbekistan	1	0	0	1
5	Japan	0	1	1	2
6	United Arab Emirates	0	1	0	1
6	Vietnam	0	1	0	1
8	Hong Kong	0	0	2	2
9	Chinese Taipei	0	0	1	1
9	Mongolia	0	0	1	1
Totals (10 entries)		5	5	5	15
