= Sergio Tu =

Taiwanese professional cyclist

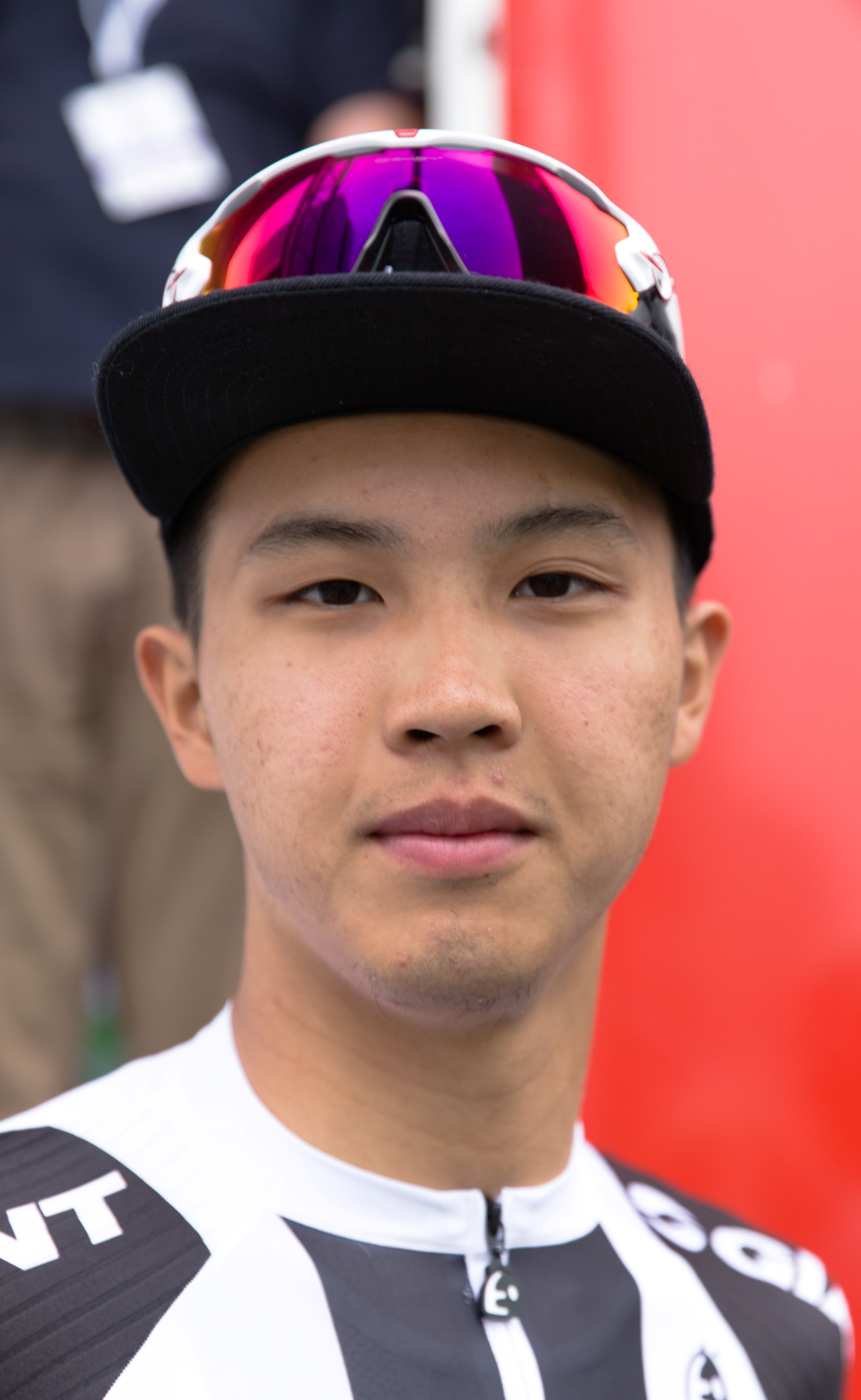
- Tu in 2018

Personal information
- Full name: Chih Hao Sergio Tu
- Born: 24 February 1997 (age 29) Santo Domingo, Dominican Republic
- Height: 1.78 m (5 ft 10 in)
- Weight: 63 kg (139 lb)

Cycling career
- Sport: Cycling
- Current team: Astemo Utsunomiya Blitzen
- Discipline: Road
- Role: Rider
- Rider type: Time trialist

Amateur teams
- 2017: Roskilde Cykle Ring
- 2021: Lizarte

Professional teams
- 2016: Team Giant Scatto
- 2017: Team Giant–Castelli
- 2018: Development Team Sunweb
- 2019: CCC Development Team
- 2020: Equipo Kern Pharma
- 2022: Cycling Team Friuli ASD
- 2023–2025: Team Bahrain Victorious
- 2026-: Astemo Utsunomiya Blitzen
Medal record
Representing Chinese Taipei
Men's road bicycle racing
Asian Championships
Silver medal – second place	2023 Rayong	Time trial
Men's track cycling
Asian Championships
Bronze medal – third place	2026 Tagaytay	Individual pursuit

Sergio Tu (Chinese: 杜志濠; pinyin: Dù Zhìháo; born 24 February 1997) is a Taiwanese professional road cyclist, who currently rides for UCI Continental Team Astemo Utsunomiya Blitzen.

== Major results ==
2016
1st Time trial, National Road Championships
2017
5th Time trial, Asian Under-23 Road Championships
2019
2nd Time trial, Asian Under-23 Road Championships
2020
1st Time trial, National Road Championships
2021
1st Time trial, National Road Championships
2023
National Road Championships

1st Time trial
2nd Road race

2nd Time trial, Asian Road Championships
5th Time trial, Asian Games
2024
4th Time trial, Asian Road Championships
