= Taiwanese National Road Championships =

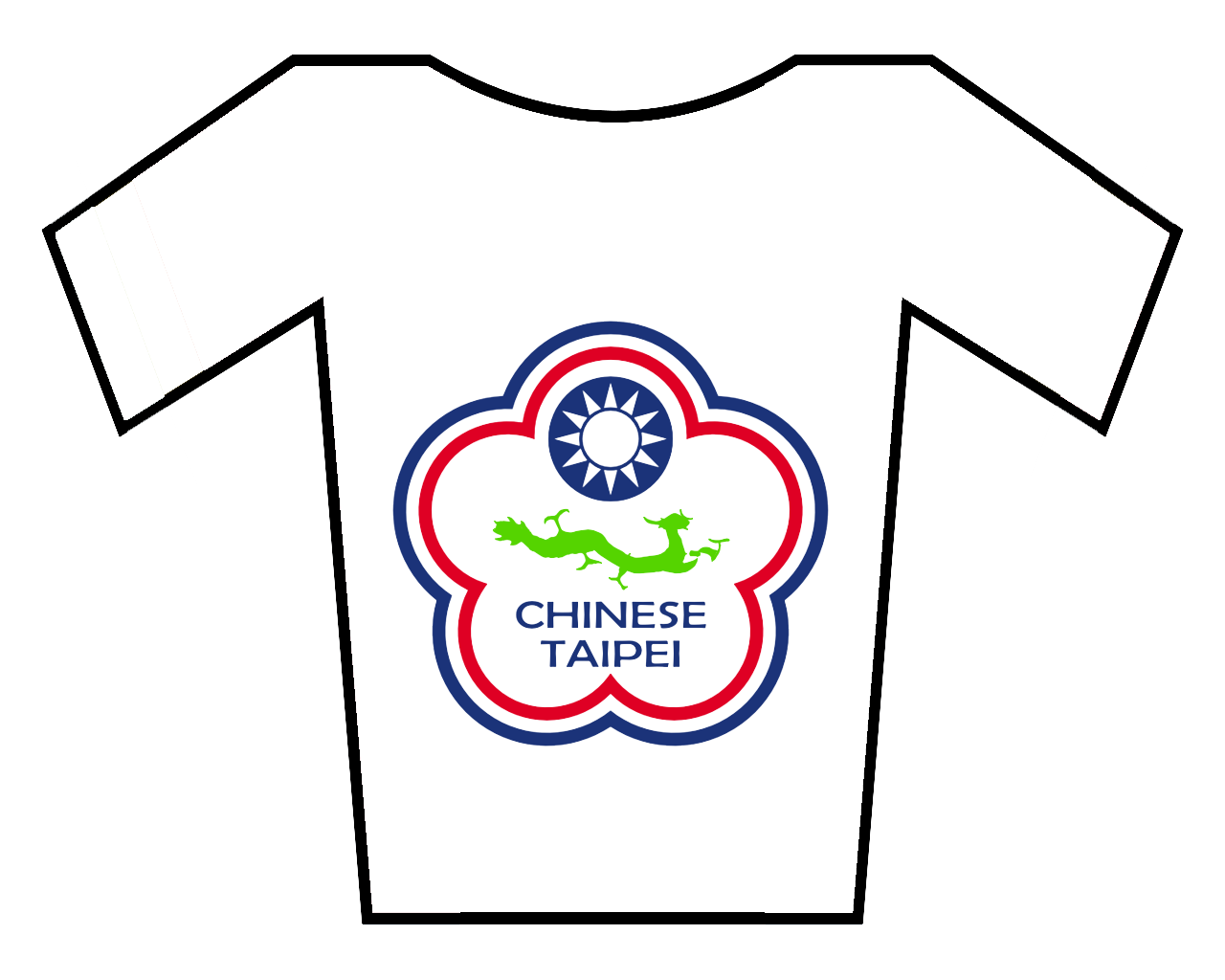

Race details
- Date: June
- Discipline: Road
- Type: One-day race

The Taiwanese National Road Championships are held annually to decide the cycling champions in both the road race and time trial discipline, across various categories.

== Men ==
=== Road race ===
Year	Winner	Second	Third
2009	Feng Chun-kai	Chen Li-wei	Chiang Li-yao
2010	Feng Chun-kai	Chiang Li-yao	Peng Yuan-tang
2011	Feng Chun-kai	Lee Wei-cheng	Liu Wei-chieh
2012	Wu Po-hung	Liu Shu-ming	Hung Kun-hung
2013	Feng Chun-kai	Hung Kun-hung	Lee Wei-cheng
2014	Feng Chun-kai	Liu Shu-ming	Peng Yuan-tang
2015	Feng Chun-kai	Lu Shao-hsuan	Chen Chien-liang
2016	Lu Shao-hsuan	Huang Wen-chung	Wu Chi-hao
2017	Feng Chun-kai	Hsu Hsuan-ping	Chen Chien-liang
2018	Feng Chun-kai	Lu Shao-hsuan	Wu Chi-hao
2019	Lu Shao-hsuan	Chen Chien-liang	Lin Xiao-long
2020	Chen Chien-liang	Wu Chi-hao	Lu Shao-hsuan
2021	Feng Chun-kai	Wu Chi-hao	Hsiao Shih Hsin

=== Time trial ===
Year	Winner	Second	Third
2012	Li Wei-cheng	Wu Po-hung
2013	Feng Chun-kai	Lee Wei-cheng	Wu Po-hung
2015	Feng Chun-kai	Yang Wu-hsin	Chen Chien-liang
2016	Sergio Tu	Yang Wu-hsin	Hsu Hsuan-ping
2017	Feng Chun-kai	Chen Chien-liang	Jing Huei Wang
2018	Feng Chun-kai	Peng Yuan-tang	Wu Chi-hao
2019	Feng Chun-kai	Wu Chi-hao	Peng Yuan-tang
2020	Sergio Tu	Wu Chi-hao	Yu Tzu-liang
2021	Sergio Tu	Yu Tzu-liang	Wu Chi-hao

== Women ==
Year	Road Race	Time Trial
2010	Ho Hsiung Huang	
2019	Huang Ting-ying	Huang Ting-ying
