= Chen Chih-hao =

Taiwanese cyclist

Chen Chih-hao (Chinese: 陳智豪; 15 January 1973) is a former Taiwanese cyclist.

Chen qualified for the Olympic men's road cycling event at the 1996 Summer Olympics, but did not finish the event. The next Taiwanese cyclist to qualify for the same event was Feng Chun-kai for the 2020 Summer Olympics. Prior to his appearance in the 1996 Summer Olympics, Chen participated in the 1993 and 1994 editions of the UCI Road World Championships in the men's team time trial, in which the Taiwanese team placed 22nd and 13th, respectively. In 1999, Chen placed 63rd in the Tour de Okinawa.
