= Rossano Veneto =

- Comune
- Comune di Rossano Veneto
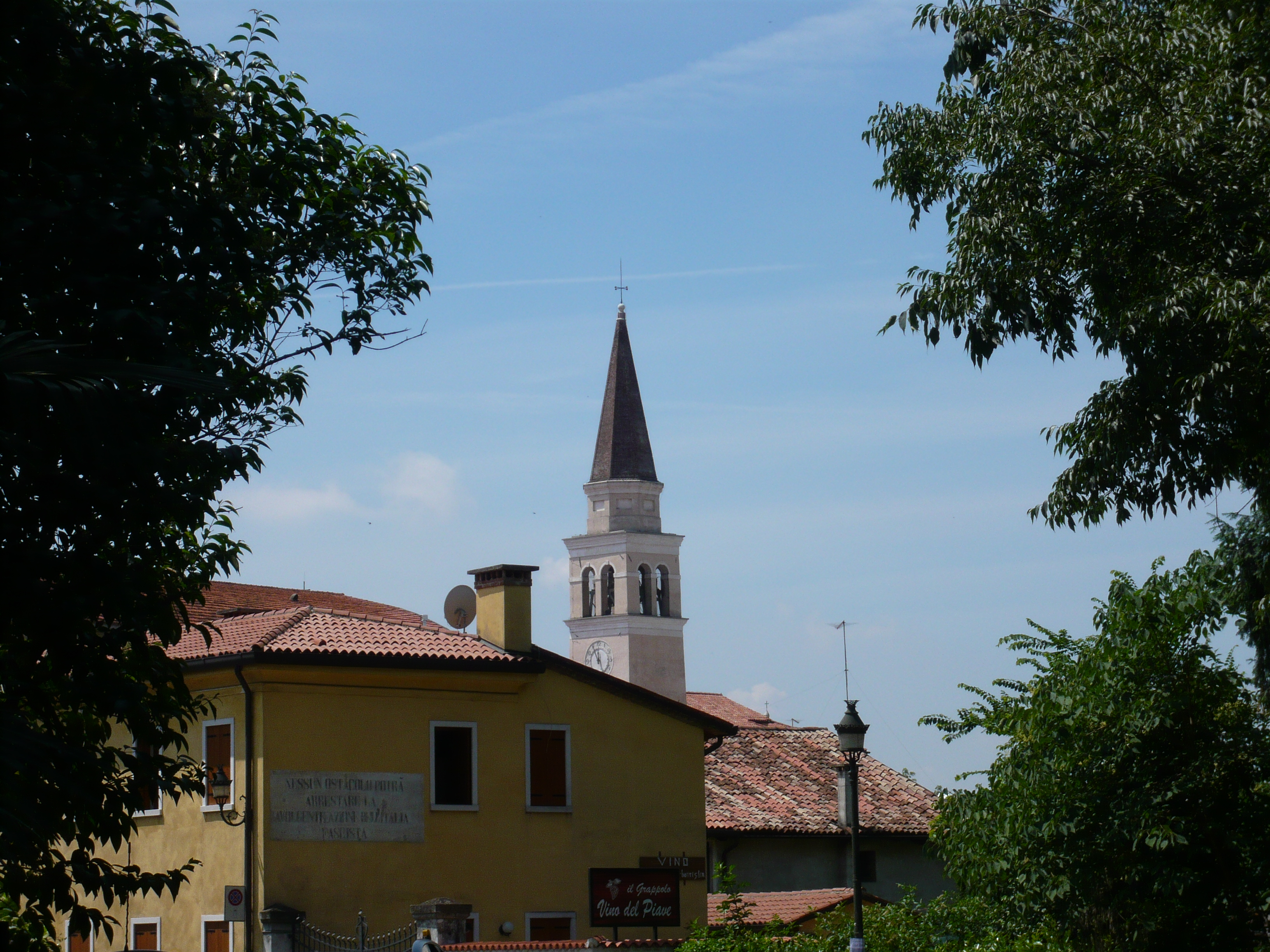
- View of Rossano Veneto

- Location within Italy Location within Veneto
- Coordinates: 45°42′N 11°48′E
- Country: Italy
- Region: Veneto
- Province: Vicenza (VI)
- Frazioni: Mottinello

Area
  - Total: 10.66 km^{2} (4.12 sq mi)
- Elevation: 78 m (256 ft)

Population (31 December 2022)
  - Total: 8,198
  - Density: 769.0/km^{2} (1,992/sq mi)
- Demonym: Rossanesi
- Time zone: UTC+1 (CET)
  - Summer (DST): UTC+2 (CEST)
- Postal code: 36028
- Dialing code: 0424
- ISTAT code: 024088
- Patron saint: Natività di Maria Vergine
- Saint day: 8 September
- Website: Official website

Rossano Veneto is a town in the province of Vicenza, Veneto, Italy, close to the border with the provinces of Treviso and Padua. It is home to racing bicycle manufacturer Wilier Triestina.

== Sources ==
- (Google Maps)
