= Action Cycling Team =

Team information
- UCI code: ACT
- Registered: Republic of China (Taiwan)
- Founded: 2010
- Discipline: Road
- Status: UCI Continental

Team name history
- 2010–2013 2015–: Action Cycling Team; Action Cycling Team

Action Cycling Team is a Taiwanese UCI Continental cycling team established in 2010.

== Team roster ==
Rider	Date of birth
Chen Chien-chou (TWN)	2 December 1997 (age 28)
Chen Chien-liang (TWN)	7 November 1993 (age 32)
Hsiao Shih Hsin (TWN)	3 April 1990 (age 36)
Hsu Ping-Hsuan (TWN)	5 July 1996 (age 30)
Huang Kuan-lin (TWN)	16 March 1998 (age 28)

Rider	Date of birth
Wu Chi-Hao (TWN)	29 December 1989 (age 36)
Wu Hsin-Lun (TWN)	24 March 1998 (age 28)
Yang Wu Hsin (TWN)	11 May 1993 (age 33)
Yu Chien-Hsien (TWN)	10 August 1995 (age 31)

== Major wins ==
2012
Stage 2 Tour of Singkarak, Shih Hsin Hsiao
