= 2022 Asian Road Cycling Championships =

- Venue: Dushanbe, Tajikistan
- Date: 25–30 March 2022

The 2022 Asian Road Cycling Championships took place in Dushanbe, Tajikistan from 25 to 30 March 2022.

== Medal summary ==
=== Men ===
Event	Gold	Silver	Bronze
Individual road race	Igor Chzhan; Kazakhstan	Nariyuki Masuda; Japan	Sainbayaryn Jambaljamts; Mongolia
Individual time trial	Yevgeniy Fedorov; Kazakhstan	Nariyuki Masuda; Japan	Muradjan Khalmuratov; Uzbekistan
Team time trial	Kazakhstan; Yuriy Natarov; Igor Chzhan; Yevgeniy Gidich; Yevgeniy Fedorov	Mongolia; Batsaikhany Tegshbayar; Erdenebatyn Bilgüünjargal; Sainbayaryn Jambaljamts; Batmönkhiin Maral-Erdene	Iran; Samad Pourseyedi; Behnam Arian; Mohammad Esmaeil Chaichi; Mohammad Ganjkhanloo

=== Women ===
Event	Gold	Silver	Bronze
Individual road race	Nguyễn Thị Thật; Vietnam	Makhabbat Umutzhanova; Kazakhstan	Anzhela Solovyeva; Kazakhstan
Individual time trial	Rinata Sultanova; Kazakhstan	Ayustina Delia Priatna; Indonesia	Tserenlkhamyn Solongo; Mongolia
Team time trial	Uzbekistan; Shakhnoza Abdullaeva; Yanina Kuskova; Margarita Misyurina; Anna Kulikova	Kazakhstan; Rinata Sultanova; Faina Potapova; Makhabbat Umutzhanova; Anzhela Solovyeva	Iran; Mandana Dehghan; Reihaneh Khatouni; Sajedeh Sayyahian; Somayyeh Yazdani

== Medal table ==
Rank	Nation	Gold	Silver	Bronze	Total
1	Kazakhstan	4	2	1	7
2	Uzbekistan	1	0	1	2
3	Vietnam	1	0	0	1
4	Japan	0	2	0	2
5	Mongolia	0	1	2	3
6	Indonesia	0	1	0	1
7	Iran	0	0	2	2
Totals (7 entries)		6	6	6	18
