= Gleb Brussenskiy =

Kazakhstani cyclist (born 2000)

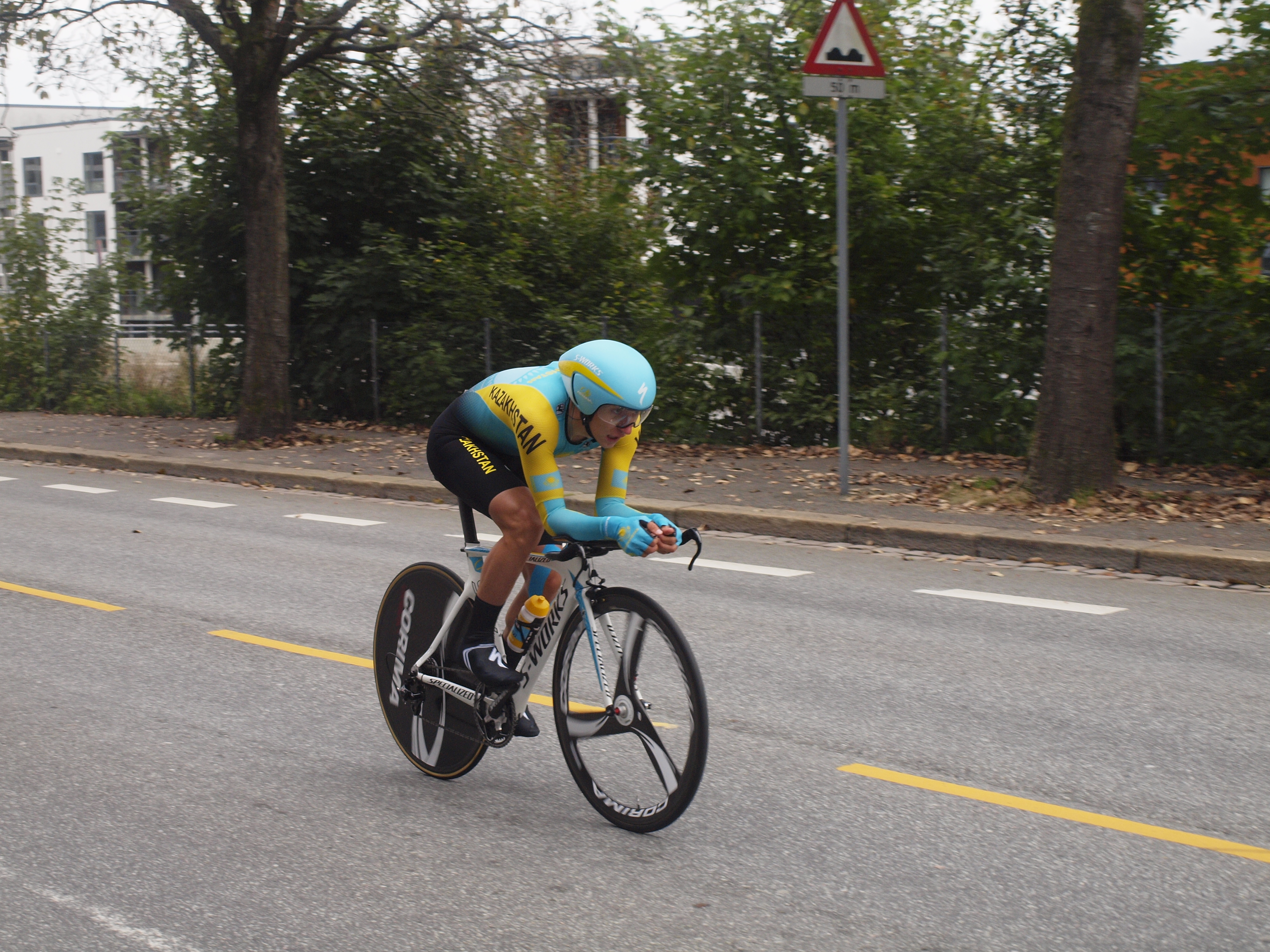
- Brussenskiy at the 2017 UCI Road World Championships

Personal information
- Full name: Gleb Brussenskiy; Russian: Глеб Брусенский
- Born: 18 April 2000 (age 26) Kokshetau, Kazakhstan
- Height: 1.78 m (5 ft 10 in)
- Weight: 64 kg (141 lb)

Cycling career
- Sport: Cycling
- Current team: XDS Astana Team
- Discipline: Road
- Role: Rider

Professional teams
- 2019–2020: Vino–Astana Motors
- 2021–2024: Astana–Premier Tech

Major wins
- One-day races and Classics Asian Road Race Championships (2023)
Medal record
Representing Kazakhstan
Men's road bicycle racing
Asian Championships
Gold medal – first place	2023 Rayong	Road race
Gold medal – first place	2022 Dushanbe	Under-23 Road race

Gleb Brussenskiy (Russian: Глеб Брусенский; born 18 April 2000) is a Kazakh professional cyclist, who currently rides for UCI WorldTeam XDS Astana Team.

== Major results ==
2017
1st Time trial, National Junior Road Championships
6th Overall Tour de DMZ
2018
1st Combined team, Summer Youth Olympics

1st Road race
2nd Criterium
10th Short track

1st Overall Tour de DMZ

1st Stage 1

2nd Time trial, National Junior Road Championships
2020
10th Overall Turul României
2022
1st Road race, Asian Under-23 Road Championships
3rd Road race, National Road Championships
2023 (1 pro win)
1st Road race, Asian Road Championships
2024
National Road Championships

2nd Road race
3rd Time trial
