= Yevgeniy Fedorov =

Kazakhstani cyclist (born 2000)

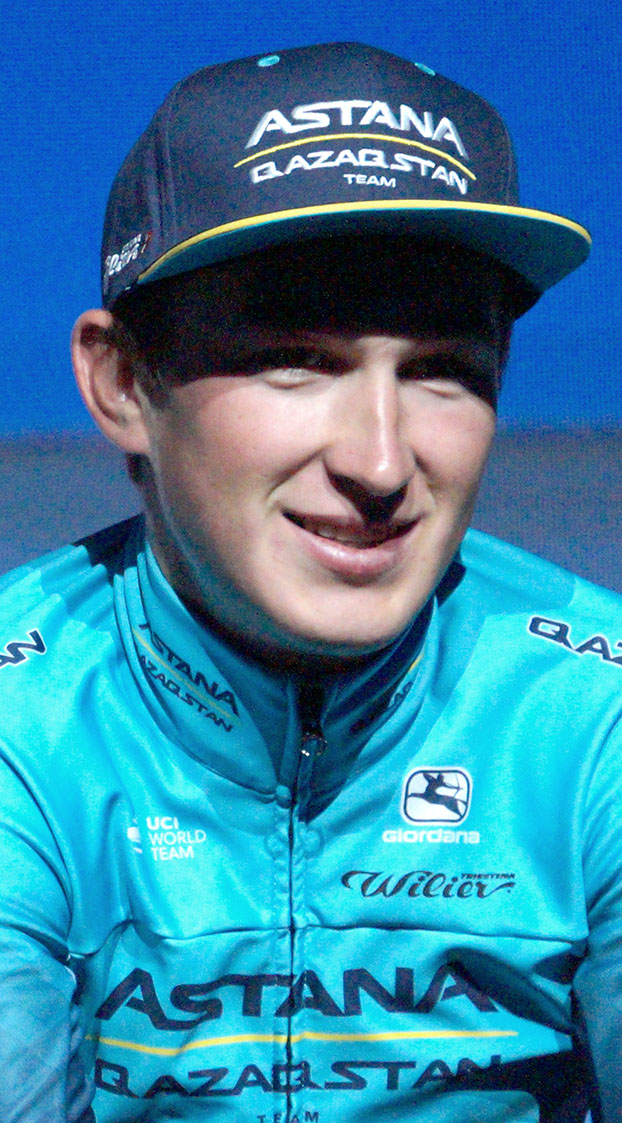
- Fedorov in 2023

Personal information
- Full name: Yevgeniy Fedorov; Russian: Евгений Фёдоров
- Born: 16 February 2000 (age 26) Aktobe, Kazakhstan
- Height: 1.93 m (6 ft 4 in)
- Weight: 80 kg (176 lb)

Cycling career
- Sport: Cycling
- Current team: XDS Astana Team
- Discipline: Road
- Role: Rider

Professional teams
- 2019–2020: Vino–Astana Motors
- 2021–: Astana–Premier Tech

Major wins
- One-day races and Classics Asian Time Trial Championships (2022, 2023, 2024) National Road Race Championships (2021, 2025) National Time Trial Championships (2025)
Medal record
Men's road bicycle racing
Representing Kazakhstan
World Championships
Gold medal – first place	2022 Wollongong	Under-23 road race
Asian Games
Gold medal – first place	2022 Hangzhou	Road race
Asian Championships
Gold medal – first place	2019 Tashkent	Under-23 time trial
Gold medal – first place	2022 Dushanbe	Time trial
Gold medal – first place	2022 Dushanbe	Team time trial
Gold medal – first place	2023 Rayong	Time trial
Gold medal – first place	2023 Rayong	Mixed team relay
Gold medal – first place	2024 Almaty	Time trial
Gold medal – first place	2024 Almaty	Mixed team relay
Gold medal – first place	2025 Phitsanulok	Time trial
Gold medal – first place	2025 Phitsanulok	Mixed team relay
Silver medal – second place	2019 Tashkent	Under-23 road race
Bronze medal – third place	2024 Almaty	Road race

Yevgeniy Vasilyevich Fedorov, or Fyodorov (Kazakh: Евгений Васильевич Федоров; born 16 February 2000), is a Kazakh professional cyclist, who currently rides for UCI WorldTeam XDS Astana Team.

He competed for Kazakhstan at the 2024 Summer Olympics in the men's individual road race and men's road time trial events.

== Major results ==
2017
National Junior Road Championships

1st Road race
6th Time trial

4th Road race, Asian Junior Road Championships
4th Overall Tour de DMZ

1st Stage 4

6th Overall Tour du Pays de Vaud
9th Road race, UCI Junior Road World Championships
2018
Summer Youth Olympics

1st Combined team
6th Criterium
8th Road race

1st Time trial, National Junior Road Championships
3rd Overall Tour de DMZ

1st Mountains classification
1st Stage 3

6th Overall Tour de Gironde
9th Overall Trophée Centre Morbihan
2019
Asian Under-23 Road Championships

1st Time trial
2nd Road race

1st Mountains classification, Tour of Almaty
2020 (2 pro wins)
1st Stage 1 Tour du Rwanda
2nd Overall Tour de Langkawi

1st Stage 1

7th Overall Tour of Szeklerland

1st Stage 1

2021 (1)
National Road Championships

1st Road race
2nd Time trial

2022 (1)
1st Road race, UCI Road World Under-23 Championships
Asian Road Championships

1st Time trial
1st Team time trial

2nd Piccolo Giro di Lombardia
5th UCI World Gravel Championships
2023 (1)
1st Road race, Asian Games
Asian Road Championships

1st Time trial
1st Mixed team time trial
10th Road race

2024 (1)
Asian Road Championships

1st Time trial
1st Mixed team time trial
3rd Road race

2025 (3)
Asian Road Championships

1st Time trial
1st Mixed team time trial

National Road Championships

1st Time trial
1st Road race

3rd Grand Prix de Fourmies
7th Grand Prix de Wallonie
2026 (1)
1st Stage 2 Baku-Khankendi Azerbaijan Cycling Race

=== Grand Tour general classification results timeline ===
Grand Tour	2022	2023	2024	2025
Giro d'Italia	—	—	—	—
Tour de France	—	148	DNF	
Vuelta a España	123	—	—	

Legend
—	Did not compete
DNF	Did not finish
