= Wilier Triestina =

Italian bicycle manufacturing company

Coordinates: 45.7022705°N 11.8080934°E

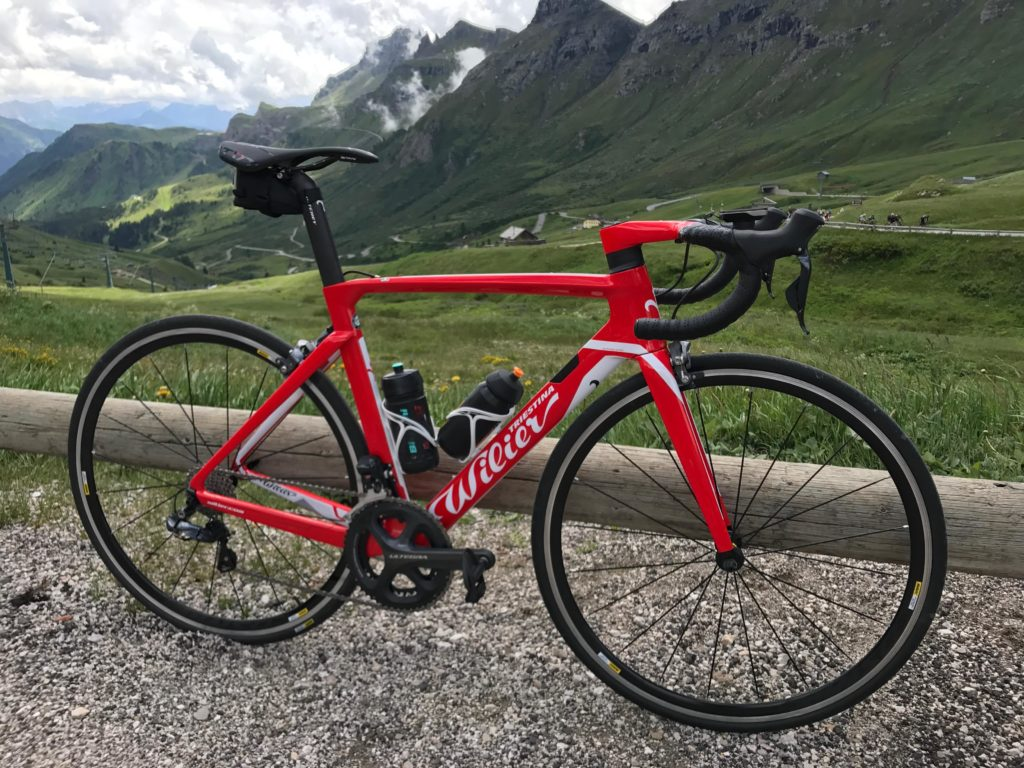
- Type: Joint-stock company
- Industry: Bicycle industry
- Founded: 1906; 120 years ago, Bassano del Grappa
- Founder: Pietro Dal Molin
- Headquarters: Rossano Veneto, Italy
- Area served: Worldwide
- Products: Bicycles; E-bikes; related components
- Website: www.wilier.com/en

Wilier Triestina (Italian pronunciation: [ˈviljɛr triesˈti:na]) is an Italian manufacturer of racing bicycles, founded in 1906 by Pietro Dal Molin in Bassano del Grappa, Italy. They are now based in Rossano Veneto, Italy.

== History ==
Wilier Triestina started in a modest workshop on the banks of the river Brenta in San Fortunato by Pietro Dal Molin from Bassano del Grappa, Italy, in the summer of 1906.

The company name originated as an acronym for the phrase "W l'Italia liberata e redenta", where the W is an abbreviation for "Viva!" (Long live Italy, liberated and redeemed). Triestina comes from the name of the city of Trieste. When Wilier was founded, Trieste was not part of Italy; the name 'Wilier Triestina' reflected a patriotic desire for it to be rejoined.

The famous Italian cyclist Fiorenzo Magni rode Wilier bikes in his 1948 Giro d'Italia win as well as his 1949 and 1950 Tour of Flanders wins.

Marco Pantani rode the 1997 Tour de France on a Wilier.

More recently World Champion Alessandro Ballan and runner up Damiano Cunego rode Wilier bicycles to victory in the 2008 UCI Road World Championships.

Since the 2018 season, Wilier Triestina supplies bikes to the UCI Pro Continental team Direct Énergie and from 2020 to 2024 to Astana Pro Team.

== See also ==
- List of bicycle parts
- List of Italian companies
