= Makhabbat Umutzhanova =

Kazakhstani cyclist (born 1994)

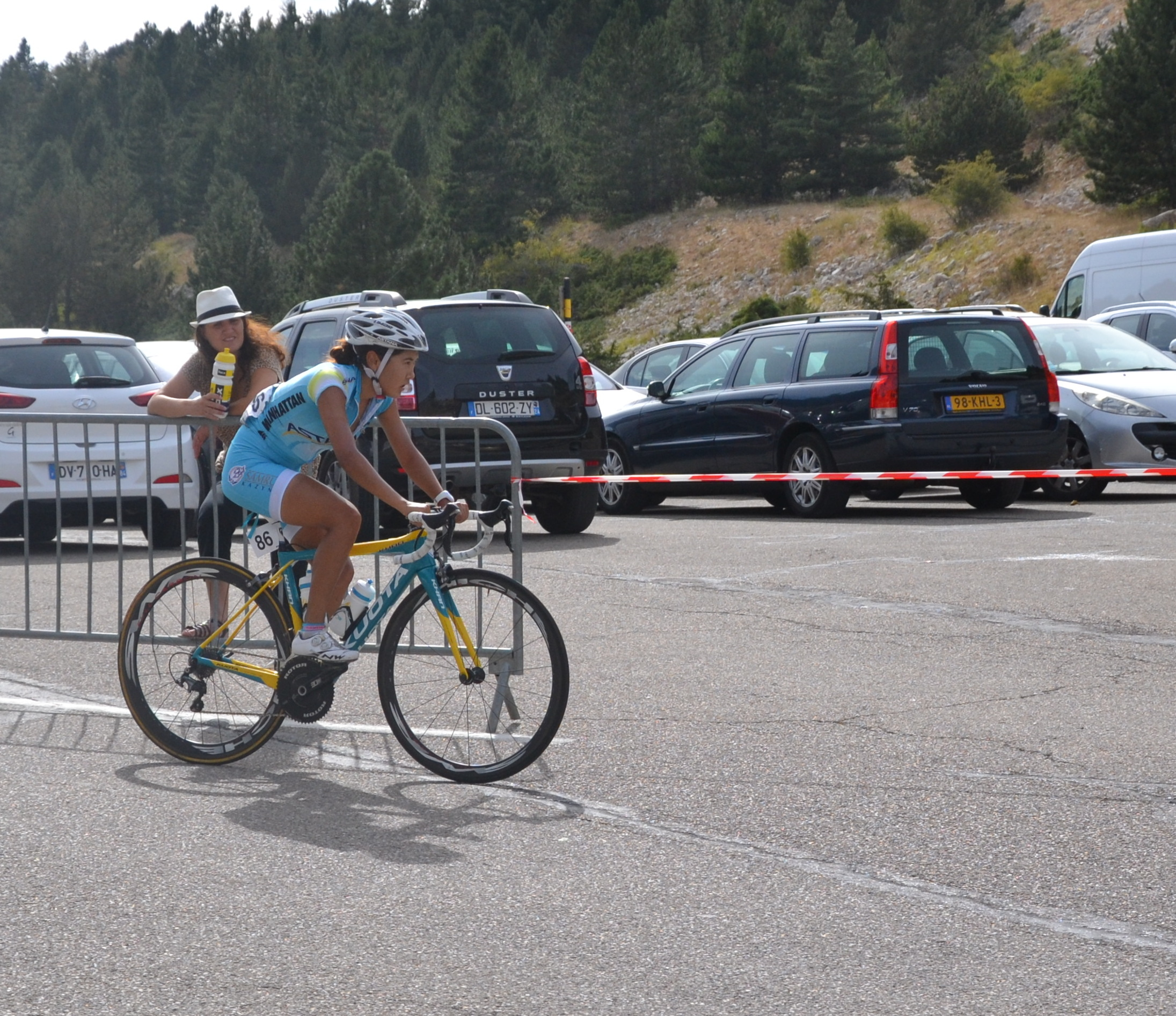
- Umutzhanova in 2016.

Personal information
- Full name: Makhabbat Umutzhanova
- Born: 11 August 1994 (age 32) Petropavl, Kazakhstan

Cycling career
- Sport: Cycling
- Discipline: Road
- Role: Rider

Amateur team
- 2021: Dubai Police Cycling Team

Professional teams
- 2014: Astana BePink Women Team
- 2015–2020: Astana–Acca Due O
Medal record
Women's road bicycle racing
Representing Kazakhstan
Asian Championships
Gold medal – first place	2025 Phitsanulok	Mixed team relay

Makhabbat Umutzhanova (born 11 August 1994) is a Kazakhstani racing cyclist, who most recently rode for the Emirati amateur team Dubai Police.

== Major results ==
2015
2nd Road race, National Road Championships
2016
3rd Time trial, National Road Championships
2017
3rd Time trial, National Road Championships
4th Road race, Asian Road Championships
9th Horizon Park Women Challenge
2018
3rd Road race, National Road Championships
2019
1st Time trial, National Road Championships
2nd Team time trial, Asian Road Championships
2021
1st Road race, National Road Championships
2022
1st Time trial, National Road Championships
Asian Road Championships

2nd Road race
2nd Team time trial

9th Grand Prix Gazipaşa

== See also ==
- List of 2016 UCI Women's Teams and riders
