= Sun Jiajun (cyclist) =

Chinese cyclist

Personal information
- Born: 29 July 1996 (age 30) Liaoning, China

Cycling career
- Sport: Cycling
- Role: Rider

Sun Jiajun (simplified Chinese: 孙佳君; traditional Chinese: 孫佳君; pinyin: Sūn Jiājūn; born 29 July 1996) is a Chinese professional racing cyclist. She rode in the women's road race at the 2016 UCI Road World Championships, but she did not finish the race.
