= 2024 Asian Road Cycling Championships =

- Venue: Almaty, Kazakhstan
- Date: 6–12 June 2024

The 2024 Asian Road Cycling Championships took place in Almaty, Kazakhstan from 6 to 12 June 2024.

== Medal summary ==
=== Men ===
| Event | Gold | Silver | Bronze |
|---|---|---|---|
| Individual road race | Kim Eu-ro; South Korea | Lü Xianjing; China | Yevgeniy Fedorov; Kazakhstan |
| Individual time trial | Yevgeniy Fedorov; Kazakhstan | Dmitriy Gruzdev; Kazakhstan | Yukiya Arashiro; Japan |

=== Women ===
| Event | Gold | Silver | Bronze |
|---|---|---|---|
| Individual road race | Song Min-ji; South Korea | Nguyễn Thị Thật; Vietnam | Tang Xin; China |
| Individual time trial | Olga Zabelinskaya; Uzbekistan | Yanina Kuskova; Uzbekistan | Rinata Sultanova; Kazakhstan |

=== Mixed ===
| Event | Gold | Silver | Bronze |
|---|---|---|---|
| Team relay | Kazakhstan; Yevgeniy Fedorov; Igor Chzhan; Dmitriy Gruzdev; Rinata Sultanova; Makhabbat Umutzhanova; Faina Potapova | Uzbekistan; Muradjan Khalmuratov; Danil Evdokimov; Bekhzodbek Rakhimbaev; Olga Zabelinskaya; Yanina Kuskova; Margarita Misyurina | Hong Kong; Vincent Lau; Ng Pak Hang; Chu Tsun Wai; Lee Sze Wing; Leung Bo Yee; Leung Wing Yee |

== Medal table ==
| Rank | Nation | Gold | Silver | Bronze | Total |
|---|---|---|---|---|---|
| 1 | Kazakhstan | 2 | 1 | 2 | 5 |
| 2 | South Korea | 2 | 0 | 0 | 2 |
| 3 | Uzbekistan | 1 | 2 | 0 | 3 |
| 4 | China | 0 | 1 | 1 | 2 |
| 5 | Vietnam | 0 | 1 | 0 | 1 |
| 6 | Hong Kong | 0 | 0 | 1 | 1 |
| 6 | Japan | 0 | 0 | 1 | 1 |
| Totals (7 entries) | | 5 | 5 | 5 | 15 |
